= French National Badminton Championships =

The French National Badminton Championships is a tournament organized to crown the best badminton players in France.

The tournament started in 1950 and is held every year.

== Past winners ==
Year	Men's singles	Women's singles	Men's doubles	Women's doubles	Mixed doubles
1950	Henri Pellizza	Noëlle Ailloud	Henri Pellizza; Bernard Minet	Noëlle Ailloud; Andrée Gremillet	Henri Pellizza; Andrée Gremillet
1951	Paul Ailloud	Noëlle Ailloud	Michel Le Renard; Maurice Mathieu	no competition	Michel Le Renard; Noëlle Ailloud
1952	Henri Pellizza	Anie Gibon	Henri Pellizza; Paul Ailloud	Noëlle Ailloud; Jeanie Boivin	Henri Pellizza; Noëlle Ailloud
1953	Henri Pellizza	Noëlle Ailloud	Henri Pellizza; Paul Ailloud	Noëlle Ailloud; Jeanie Boivin	Henri Pellizza; Noëlle Ailloud
1954	Henri Pellizza	Noëlle Ailloud	Henri Pellizza; Maurice Mathieu	Noëlle Ailloud; Janie Mathieu	Henri Pellizza; Noëlle Ailloud
1955	Henri Pellizza	Régina Augry	Henri Pellizza; Maurice Mathieu	Yvonne Girard; Mireille Laurent	Henri Pellizza; Noëlle Ailloud
1956	Ghislain Vasseur	Mireille Laurent	Ghislain Vasseur; Pierre Lenoir	Régina Augry; Nicole Kozlowski	Ghislain Vasseur; José Isabelle
1957	Ghislain Vasseur	Mireille Laurent	Henri Pellizza; Maurice Mathieu	Annie Groene; José Isabelle	Henri Pellizza; Mireille Laurent
1958	Ghislain Vasseur	Annie Groene	Ghislain Vasseur; Pierre Lenoir	Régina Augry; Marie-Josée Nicol	Ghislain Vasseur; José Isabelle
1959	Ghislain Vasseur	Annie Groene	Henri Pellizza; Maurice Mathieu	Régina Augry; Annie Groene	Ghislain Vasseur; Annie Groene
1960	Christian Badou	Jeanie Mathieu	Michel Le Renard; Paul Ailloud	Annie Causse; Jacqueline Robert	Christian Badou; Annie Causse
1961	Christian Badou	Jeanie Mathieu	Ghislain Vasseur; Christian Badou	Annie Groene; Jacqueline Robert	Maurice Mathieu; Jeanie Mathieu
1962	Ghislain Vasseur	Annie Causs	Ghislain Vasseur; Christian Badou	Annie Groene; Annie Causs	Yves Corbel; Annie Causs
1963	Ghislain Vasseur	Annie Causs	Joël Le Houérou; Yves Corbel	Annie Groene; Annie Causs	Gérard Vallet; Annie Causs
1964	Christian Badou	Jeanie Mathieu	Ghislain Vasseur; Christian Badou	Annie Vallet; Françoise Lequellenec	Christian Badou; Annie Groene
1965	Christian Badou	Viviane Beaugin	Ghislain Vasseur; Yves Corbel	Annie Vallet; Françoise Lequellenec	Christian Badou; Viviane Beaugin
1966	Christian Badou	Martine Villerm	Gérard Vallet; Yves Corbel	Mireille Laurent; Jeanie Mathieu	Gérard Vallet; Annie Vallet
1967	Christian Badou	Miraille Laurent	Gérard Vallet; Yves Corbel	Viviane Beaugin; Martine Villerm	Christian Badou; Viviane Beaugin
1968	Christian Badou	Viviane Beaugin	Gérard Vallet; Yves Corbel	Viviane Beaugin; Martine Villerm	Christian Badou; Viviane Beaugin
1969	Christian Badou	Viviane Beaugin	Gérard Vallet; Yves Corbel	Viviane Beaugin; Martine Villerm	Christian Badou; Viviane Beaugin
1970	Christian Badou	Viviane Beaugin	Christian Badou; Alain Baquet	Viviane Beaugin; Dominique Vauclin	Christian Badou; Viviane Beaugin
1971	Christian Badou	Viviane Bonnay	Christian Badou; Alain Oleskiewiez	Mireille Laurent; Lisa Mauhourat	Christian Badou; Viviane Bonnay
1972	Christian Badou	Viviane Bonnay	Christian Badou; Yves Corbel	Viviane Bonnay; Annie Vallet	Christian Badou; Viviane Bonnay
1973	Christian Badou	Viviane Bonnay	Christian Badou; Yves Corbel	Viviane Bonnay; Annie Vallet	Christian Badou; Viviane Bonnay
1974	Christian Badou	Viviane Bonnay	Christian Badou; Yves Corbel	Viviane Bonnay; Yveline Hue	Christian Badou; Viviane Bonnay
1975	Christian Badou	Viviane Bonnay	Christian Badou; Yves Corbel	Viviane Bonnay; Yveline Hue	Christian Badou; Viviane Bonnay
1976	Christian Badou	Viviane Bonnay	Christian Badou; Yves Corbel	Viviane Bonnay; Yveline Hue	Christian Badou; Viviane Bonnay
1977	Alain Baquet	Viviane Bonnay	Christian Badou; Yves Corbel	Viviane Bonnay; Yveline Hue	Christian Badou; Viviane Bonnay
1978	Joël Gueguen	Anne Meniane	Patrice Lehouerou; Yves Corbel	Michèle Bontemps; Anne Meniane	Jean-Claude Bertrand; Anne Meniane
1979	Joël Gueguen	Anne Meniane	Patrice Lehouerou; Yves Corbel	Michèle Bontemps; Anne Meniane	Jean-Claude Bertrand; Anne Meniane
1980	Joël Gueguen	Anne Meniane	Patrice Lehouerou; Yves Corbel	Fabianne Chaboussie; Anne Meniane	Yves Corbel; Yveline Hue
1981	Jean-Claude Bertrand	Catherine Lechalupe	Marc Faraggi; Lam Quan Tong	Michèle Bontemps; Catherine Lechalupe	Lam Quan Tong; Sylvie Robert
1982	Benoit Pitte	Anne Meniane	Patrice Lehouerou; Yves Corbel	Anne Meniane; Catherine Lechalupe	Jean-Claude Bertrand; Catherine Lechalupe
1983	Jean-Claude Bertrand	Catherine Lechalupe	Jean-Claude Bertrand; Lam Quan Tong	Patricia Choel; Catherine Lechalupe	Jean-Claude Bertrand; Catherine Lechalupe
1984	Benoit Pitte	Anne Meniane	Benoit Pitte; Christophe Jeanjean	Anne Meniane; Fabienne Chaboussie	Jean-Claude Bertrand; Anne Meniane
1985	Benoit Pitte	Anne Meniane	Benoit Pitte; Christophe Jeanjean	Anne Meniane; Sylvie Debienne	Jean-Claude Bertrand; Anne Meniane
1986	Benoit Pitte	Anne Meniane	Jean-Claude Bertrand; Kiet Truong	Anne Meniane; Sylvie Debienne	Jean-Claude Bertrand; Anne Meniane
1987	Stéphane Renault	Rosita Rios	Benoit Pitte; Christophe Jeanjean	Cecilia Brun; Fabienne Pichard	Kiet Truong; Sylvie Debienne
1988	Christophe Jeanjean	Elodie Mansuy	Benoit Pitte; Christophe Jeanjean	Cecilia Brun; Fabienne Pichard	Jean-Claude Bertrand; Anne Meriane
1989	Franck Panel	Sandra Dimbour	Pascal Pak; Christophe Jeanjean	Virginie Delvingt; Christelle Mol	Pascal Jorssen; Sandra Dimbour
1990	Franck Panel	Christelle Mol	Franck Panel; Stéphane Renault	Sandra Dimbour; Christelle Mol	Pascal Jorssen; Sandra Dimbour
1991	Etienne Thobois	Christelle Mol	Franck Panel; Stéphane Renault	Christelle Mol; Virginie Delvingt	Christophe Jeanjean; Virginie Delvingt
1992	Jean-Frédéric Massias	Sandra Dimbour	Jean-Frédéric Massias; Christophe Jeanjean	Sandrine Lefèvre; Elodie Mansuy	Christophe Jeanjean; Virginie Delvingt
1993	Etienne Thobois	Sandra Dimbour	Jean-Frédéric Massias; Christophe Jeanjean	Sandrine Lefèvre; Elodie Mansuy	Manuel Dubrulle; Virginie Delvingt
1994	Etienne Thobois	Sandra Dimbour	Christophe Jeanjean; Manuel Dubrulle	Sandra Dimbour; Christelle Mol	Manuel Dubrulle; Virginie Delvingt
1995	Jean-Frédéric Massias	Sandra Dimbour	Manuel Dubrulle; Vincent Laigle	Christelle Mol; Tatiana Vattier	Manuel Dubrulle; Virginie Delvingt
1996	Bertrand Gallet	Sandra Dimbour	Manuel Dubrulle; Vincent Laigle	Sandrine Lefèvre; Virginie Delvingt	Manuel Dubrulle; Virginie Delvingt
1997	Bertrand Gallet	Sandra Dimbour	Manuel Dubrulle; Vincent Laigle	Sandra Dimbour; Christelle Szynal	Manual Dubrulle; Sandrine Lefèvre
1998	Nabil Lasmari	Sandra Dimbour	Manuel Dubrulle; Vincent Laigle	Sandra Dimbour; Sandrine Lefèvre	Sydney Lengagne; Sandrine Lefèvre
1999	Bertrand Gallet	Élodie Eymard	Manuel Dubrulle; Vincent Laigle	Sandra Dimbour; Tatiana Vattier	Manuel Dubrulle; Tatiana Vattier
2000	Nabil Lasmari	Tatiana Vattier	Bertrand Gallet; Jean-Michel Lefort	Amélie Decelle; Élodie Eymard	Sydney Lengagne; Christelle Vallet-Szynal
2001	Bertrand Gallet	Tatiana Vattier	Bertrand Gallet; Jean-Michel Lefort	Amélie Decelle; Élodie Eymard	Manuel Dubrulle; Tatiana Vattier
2002	Nabil Lasmari	Tatiana Vattier	Vincent Laigle; Svetoslav Stoyanov	Amélie Decelle; Élodie Eymard	Svetoslav Stoyanov; Victoria Hristova
2003	Jean-Michel Lefort	Élodie Eymard	Manuel Dubrulle; Michail Popov	Tatiana Vattier; Victoria Hristova	Svetoslav Stoyanov; Victoria Hristova
2004	Nabil Lasmari	Tatiana Vattier	Bertrand Gallet; Jean-Michel Lefort	Tatiana Vattier; Victoria Hristova Wright	Svetoslav Stoyanov; Victoria Hristova Wright
2005	Jean-Michel Lefort	Pi Hongyan	Erwin Kehlhoffner; Thomas Quéré	Élodie Eymard; Weny Rahmawati	Jean-Michel Lefort; Weny Rahmawati
2006	Simon Maunoury	Pi Hongyan	Erwin Kehlhoffner; Thomas Quéré	Élodie Eymard; Weny Rahmawati	Svetoslav Stoyanov; Pi Hongyan
2007	Simon Maunoury	Pi Hongyan	Svetoslav Stoyanov; Mihaïl Popov	Élodie Eymard; Weny Rahmawati	Svetoslav Stoyanov; Élodie Eymard
2008	Brice Leverdez	Pi Hongyan	Svetoslav Stoyanov; Erwin Kehlhoffner	Élodie Eymard; Weny Rahmawati	Svetoslav Stoyanov; Élodie Eymard
2009	Brice Leverdez	Pi Hongyan	Svetoslav Stoyanov; Sébastien Vincent	Elodie Eymard; Julie Delaune	Baptiste Carême; Laura Choinet
2010	Brice Leverdez	Pi Hongyan	Svetoslav Stoyanov; Erwin Kehlhoffner	Laura Choinet; Weny Rahmawati	Baptiste Carême; Laura Choinet
2011	Brice Leverdez	Perrine Lebuhanic	Baptiste Carême; Sylvain Grosjean	Laura Choinet; Weny Rasidi	Baptiste Carême; Laura Choinet
2012	Brice Leverdez	Hongyan Pi	Baptiste Carême; Sylvain Grosjean	Hongyan Pi; Émilie Lefel	Baptiste Carême; Audrey Fontaine
2013	Brice Leverdez	Delphine Lansac	Baptiste Carême; Gaëtan Mittelheisser	Delphine Lansac; Anne Tran	Ronan Labar; Laura Choinet
2014	Brice Leverdez	Sashina Vignes Waran	Baptiste Carême; Ronan Labar	Delphine Lansac; Stacey Guérin	Laurent Constantin; Laura Choinet
2015	Brice Leverdez	Sashina Vignes Waran	Baptiste Carême; Ronan Labar	Delphine Lansac; Émilie Lefel	Ronan Labar; Émilie Lefel
2016	Lucas Corvée	Perrine Le Buhanic	Bastian Kersaudy; Gaëtan Mittelheisser	Delphine Delrue; Léa Palermo	Gaëtan Mittelheisser; Audrey Fontaine
2017	Lucas Corvée	Delphine Lansac	Bastian Kersaudy; Julien Maio	Émilie Lefel; Anne Tran	Ronan Labar; Audrey Fontaine
2018	Lucas Claerbout	Léonice Huet	Bastian Kersaudy; Julien Maio	Vimala Hériau; Léonice Huet	Thom Gicquel; Delphine Delrue
2019	Brice Leverdez	Marie Batomene	Bastian Kersaudy; Julien Maio	Delphine Delrue; Léa Palermo	Thom Gicquel; Delphine Delrue
2020	Christo Popov	Qi Xuefei	Thom Gicquel; Ronan Labar	Vimala Hériau; Margot Lambert	Thom Gicquel; Delphine Delrue
2021	Arnaud Merklé	Yaëlle Hoyaux	Lucas Corvée; Ronan Labar	Flavie Vallet; Émilie Vercelot	Ronan Labar; Rosy Oktavia Pancasari
2022	Christo Popov	Qi Xuefei	Christo Popov; Toma Junior Popov	Margot Lambert; Anne Tran	Thom Gicquel; Delphine Delrue
2023	Toma Junior Popov	Qi Xuefei	Julien Maio; William Villeger	Margot Lambert; Anne Tran	Thom Gicquel; Delphine Delrue
2024	Christo Popov	Léonice Huet	Julien Maio; William Villeger	Margot Lambert; Anne Tran	Tom Lalot-Trescarte; Elsa Jacob
2025	Alex Lanier	Qi Xuefei	Christo Popov; Toma Junior Popov	Margot Lambert; Delphine Delrue	Thom Gicquel; Delphine Delrue
