= French Open (badminton) =

Annual badminton tournament held in France

- Official website
- Founded: 1908; 118 years ago
- Editions: 94 (2026)
- Location: Tremblay-en-France (2026); France
- Venue: Arena Grand Paris (2026)
- Prize money: USD950,000 (2026)

Men's
- Draw: 32S / 32D
- Current champions: Christo Popov (singles); Man Wei Chong; Tee Kai Wun (doubles)
- Most singles titles: 4 George Alan Thomas; Henri Pellizza
- Most doubles titles: 4 George Alan Thomas; Henri Pellizza; Eddy L. Choong; Carsten Mogensen

Women's
- Draw: 32S / 32D
- Current champions: An Se-young (singles); Yuki Fukushima; Mayu Matsumoto (doubles)
- Most singles titles: 6 Yvonne Girard
- Most doubles titles: 6 Yvonne Girard

Mixed doubles
- Draw: 32
- Current champions: Feng Yanzhe; Huang Dongping
- Most titles (male): 4 George Alan Thomas
- Most titles (female): 4 Madeleine Girard

Super 750
- China Masters; Denmark Open; French Open; India Open; Japan Open; Singapore Open

Last completed
- 2026 French Open

The French Open (French: Internationaux de France de Badminton) is an annual badminton tournament held in France since 1909 and hosted by the Fédération Française de Badminton (FFBad).

The tournament was halted between 1915 and 1934, in 1965, 1970, 1972, 1994 and 2006. Not previously considered one of the international badminton circuit's leading events, it was promoted to become part of the BWF Super Series in 2007 making the French Open one of the 12 major badminton tournaments in the world. BWF categorised French Open as one of the five BWF World Tour Super 750 events per the BWF events structure since 2018.

== Locations ==
Below is the cities that have hosted the tournament.

- 1999, 2003–2005, 2007–2019, 2021–2022, 2024: Paris
- 2023, 2025: Cesson-Sévigné
- 2026: Tremblay-en-France
Locations of French Open host cities

== Past winners ==
| Year | Men's singles | Women's singles | Men's doubles | Women's doubles | Mixed doubles |
|---|---|---|---|---|---|
| 1908 | (England) Frank Chesterton | (England) Margaret Larminie | (England) Frank Chesterton (England) Stewart Marsden Massey | (England) Margaret Larminie (England) Lavinia Clara Radeglia | (England) Frank Chesterton (England) Margaret Larminie |
| 1909 | (England) Frank Chesterton | (England) Lavinia Clara Radeglia | (England) George Alan Thomas (England) Guy A. Sautter | (England) Margaret Larminie (England) Muriel Bateman | (England) George Alan Thomas (England) Muriel Bateman |
| 1910 | (England) George Alan Thomas | (England) Lavinia Clara Radeglia | (England) George Alan Thomas (England) Guy A. Sautter | (England) Lavinia Clara Radeglia (England) Muriel Bateman | (England) George Alan Thomas (England) Muriel Bateman |
| 1911 | (England) George Alan Thomas | (England) Lavinia Clara Radeglia | (England) George Alan Thomas (England) Guy A. Sautter | (England) Lavinia Clara Radeglia (England) Muriel Bateman | (England) Guy A. Sautter (England) Lavinia Clara Radeglia |
| 1912 | (England) George Alan Thomas | (England) Lavinia Clara Radeglia | (England) George Alan Thomas (England) H. A. Gardner | (England) Lavinia Clara Radeglia (France) Cécile Ropert | (England) George Alan Thomas (England) Lavinia Clara Radeglia |
| 1913 | (England) George Alan Thomas | (England) Lavinia Clara Radeglia | (England) Bertram Bisgood (England) Robert McCallum | (England) Lavinia Clara Radeglia (England) Muriel Bateman | (England) George Alan Thomas (England) Lavinia Clara Radeglia |
| 1914–1934 | No competition | | | | |
| 1935 | (England) Ralph Nichols | (England) Betty Uber | (England) Ralph Nichols (England) Geoffrey J. Fish | (England) Betty Uber (England) Diana Doveton | (England) Ralph Nichols (England) Diana Doveton |
| 1936 | (Irish Free State) Ian Maconachie | (England) Marian Horsley | (Irish Free State) Ian Maconachie (Irish Free State) K. Smedley | (England) Margaret Tragett (England) Marian Horsley | (Irish Free State) Ian Maconachie (England) Marian Horsley |
| 1937 | (Irish Free State) Ian Maconachie | (England) Mavis Green | (Irish Free State) Ian Maconachie (Irish Free State) K. Smedley | (England) Daphne Young (England) Mavis Green | (England) D. E. Kenyon (England) Mavis Green |
| 1938 | (Irish Free State) Ian Maconachie | (England) Daphne Young | (Irish Free State) Ian Maconachie (Irish Free State) K. Smedley | (England) Daphne Young (England) Mavis Green | (Republic of Ireland) Ian Maconachie (England) Mavis Green |
| 1939 | A. S. Samuel | (England) Mavis Green | A. S. Samuel (England) C. C. Rickets | (England) Connie Davidson (England) Mavis Green | (England) C. C. Ricketts (England) Mavis Green |
| 1940 | (France) Henri Pellizza | (France) Yvonne Girard | (France) Henri Pellizza (France) René Gathier | (France) Yvonne Girard (France) Madeleine Girard | (France) Henri Pellizza (France) Madeleine Girard |
| 1941 | (France) Michel Marret | (France) Yvonne Girard | (France) Michel Marret (France) René Mathieu | (France) Yvonne Girard (France) Madeleine Girard | (France) Michel Marrett (France) Madeleine Girard |
| 1942 | (France) Yves Baudoin | (France) Yvonne Girard | (France) Michel Marret (France) René Mathieu | (France) Yvonne Girard (France) Madeleine Girard | (France) Michel Marrett (France) Madeleine Girard |
| 1943 | (France) Henri Pellizza | (France) Yvonne Girard | (France) Michel Marret (France) Henri Pellizza | (France) Yvonne Girard (France) Madeleine Girard | (France) Michel Marrett (France) Madeleine Girard |
| 1944 | (France) Henri Pellizza | (France) Yvonne Girard | (France) Michel Marret (France) Henri Pellizza | (France) Yvonne Girard (France) Madeleine Girard | (France) Henri Pellizza (France) Simone Pellizza |
| 1945 | (United States) Ozzie Hilton | (France) Yvonne Girard | (United States) Ozzie Hilton (France) Jacques Rozier | (France) Yvonne Girard (France) Madeleine Girard | (United States) Ozzie Hilton (France) Claude Carvallo |
| 1946 | (France) Henri Pellizza | (Canada) Jean Bardsley | (France) Michel Marret (France) Henri Pellizza | (France) Yvonne Girard (France) Madeleine Girard | (France) Yves Baudoin (France) Yvonne Girard |
| 1947 | (England) James Hone | (England) Lucy Barlow | (England) S. G. Bell (England) James Hone | (England) Mavis Henderson (England) Lucy Barlow | (England) James Hone (England) Mavis Henderson |
| 1948 | (Denmark) Palle Granlund | (England) Mavis Henderson | (Denmark) Niels Greaffe (Denmark) Bent Palling | (England) Mavis Henderson (England) Audrey Stone | (England) James Hone (England) Mavis Henderson |
| 1949 | (Federation of Malaya) Eddy L. Choong | (Denmark) Anne Lehmeier | (Malaysia) Foo Sun Lau (Malaysia) Yet Sun Lau | (England) Mavis Henderson (England) Audrey Stone | (Malaysia) Eddy L. Choong (Denmark) Anne Lehmeier |
| 1950 | (Federation of Malaya) Eddy L. Choong | (England) Audrey Blathwayt | (Federation of Malaya) Eddy L. Choong (England) John Newland | (England) Audrey Blathwayt (England) M. Crombie | (Federation of Malaya) Eddy L. Choong (England) Audrey Stone |
| 1951 | (Federation of Malaya) Ong Poh Lim | (England) Betty Grace | (Federation of Malaya) Ong Poh Lim (Federation of Malaya) Ismail bin Marjan | (England) Q. M. Allen Webber (England) Audrey Stone | (Federation of Malaya) Eddy B. Choong (England) Q. M. Allen Webber |
| 1952 | (Federation of Malaya) Eddy B. Choong | (England) Audrey Stone | (Federation of Malaya) Eddy L. Choong (Federation of Malaya) Eddy B. Choong | (England) Mavis Henderson (England) Audrey Stone | (Federation of Malaya) Eddy B. Choong (England) Q. M. Allen Webber |
| 1953 | (Federation of Malaya) Eddy B. Choong | (Denmark) Aase Schiøtt Jacobsen | (Federation of Malaya) Eddy L. Choong (Federation of Malaya) Eddy B. Choong | (Denmark) Aase Schiøtt Jacobsen (Denmark) A. Petersen | (Federation of Malaya) Eddy B. Choong (England) J. Peters |
| 1954 | (Scotland) Alistair McIntyre | (England) Elisabeth O'Beirne | (England) Ralph Nichols (England) Geoffrey J. Fish | (England) Elisabeth O'Beirne (England) Marie Rose Wyatt | (England) Ralph Nichols (England) Elisabeth O'Beirne |
| 1955 | (Scotland) S. D. McLean | (England) Anne Durst | (France) Pierre Lenoir (France) Ghislain Vasseur | (France) Yvonne Girard (France) Mireille Laurent | (Scotland) S. D. McLean (Scotland) H. Laing |
| 1956 | (Wales) Gordon Rowlands | (Scotland) Maggie McIntosh | (India) A. C. Bahrée (Federation of Malaya) C. L. Yap | (Scotland) Marjory B. Forrester (Scotland) Maggie McIntosh | (Scotland) A. J. Malone (Scotland) Marjory B. Forrester |
| 1957 | (Indonesia) Ferry Sonneville | (England) Sheila Ryder | (Federation of Malaya) Eddy L. Choong (Indonesia) Ferry Sonneville | (England) Mimi Wyatt (England) Ruth Page | (Federation of Malaya) Eddy L. Choong (England) Sonia Cambril |
| 1958 | (West Germany) Peter Knack | (Thailand) Pratuang Pattabongs | (Sweden) Atte Nyberg (Sweden) Rolf Olsson | (Thailand) Pratuang Pattabongs (England) Julie Charles | (Sweden) Rolf Olsson (Sweden) Ingrid Dahlberg |
| 1959 | (Singapore) Lee Kin Tat | (England) Pamela S. Wheating | (Singapore) Lee Kin Tat (Federation of Malaya) Jimmy Lim | (France) Mireille Laurent (England) Marjorie Sharp | (Sweden) Atte Nyberg (France) Mireille Laurent |
| 1960 | (Indonesia) Ferry Sonneville | (England) Rita Rabey | (Federation of Malaya) Heah Hock Heng (Federation of Malaya) Jimmy Lim | (England) Audrey Stone (England) Ursula Smith | (Indonesia) Ferry Sonneville (Indonesia) Yvonne Theresia Sonneville |
| 1961 | (Denmark) Erland Kops | (Denmark) Hanne Jensen | (Denmark) Finn Kobberø (Denmark) Erland Kops | (England) Rita Rabey (England) Janet Brennan | (Denmark) Erland Kops (Denmark) Hanne Jensen |
| 1962 | (Thailand) Charoen Wattanasin | (Federation of Malaya) Tan Gaik Bee | (Denmark) Finn Kobberø (Denmark) Bengt Nielsen | (Denmark) Bitten Nielsen (Federation of Malaya) Tan Gaik Bee | (Denmark) Finn Kobberø (Federation of Malaya) Tan Gaik Bee |
| 1963 | (Singapore) Lee Kin Tat | (West Germany) Irmgard Latz | (Switzerland) Heinz Honegger (Denmark) Torkild Nielsen | (West Germany) Irmgard Latz (Netherlands) Imre Rietveld | (England) C. Harvey (England) Janet Brennan |
| 1964 | (Malaysia) Oon Chong Jin | (Netherlands) Imre Rietveld | (Malaysia) Oon Chong Teik (Malaysia) Oon Chong Jin | (England) Julie Charles (Netherlands) Imre Rietveld | (England) Oon Chong Jin (England) Julie Charles |
| 1965 | No competition | | | | |
| 1966 | (Indonesia) Ang Tjin Siang | (Netherlands) Imre Rietveld | (Indonesia) Ang Tjin Siang (Indonesia) Wong Pek Sen | (England) Julie Charles (Netherlands) Imre Rietveld | (Denmark) Erland Kops (Denmark) Marianne Svensson |
| 1967 | (Singapore) Lee Kin Tat | (West Germany) Gerda Schuhmacher | (West Germany) Willi Braun (West Germany) Detlef Würfel | (England) Julie Charles (Netherlands) Imre Rietveld | (West Germany) Klaus Tetenberg (West Germany) Gudrun Ziebold |
| 1968 | (Sweden) Sture Johnsson | (Sweden) Eva Twedberg | (West Germany) Horst Lösche (West Germany) Gerhard Kucki | (Sweden) Eva Twedberg (West Germany) Karin Dittberner | (Netherlands) Herman Leidelmeijer (Netherlands) Lili ter Metz |
| 1969 | (Denmark) Elo Hansen | (England) Julie Rickard | (Malaysia) Oon Chong Hau (Singapore) Koh Kheng Siong | (England) Julie Rickard (New Zealand) Alison Glenie | (Denmark) Elo Hansen (Denmark) Lene Horvid |
| 1970 | No competition | | | | |
| 1971 | (West Germany) Torsten Winter | (West Germany) Brigitte Potthoff | (West Germany) Torsten Winter (West Germany) Hugo Wilmes | (West Germany) Brigitte Potthoff (Belgium) June Jacques | (West Germany) Klaus Steden (West Germany) Brigitte Potthoff |
| 1972 | (Belgium) Herman Moens | (England) Margaret Gardner | (West Germany) Holger Rode (West Germany) Edelwald Rumpel | (England) Margaret Gardner (France) Yveline Hue | (Denmark) Per Walsøe (France) Yveline Hue |
| 1973 | (Denmark) Tage Nielsen | (Denmark) Lene Büchert | (England) Peter Bullivant (England) William Kidd | (Denmark) Lene Büchert (Denmark) Kirsten Kjærbye | (Denmark) Søren Willandsen (Denmark) Vibeke Brisson |
| 1974 | (England) David Hunt | (England) Margaret Gardner | (England) David Hunt (England) Peter Penneket | (England) Margaret Gardner (England) Patricia Assinder | (Belgium) Daniel Gosset (Belgium) Kirsten Ballisager |
| 1975 | (England) David Hunt | (Taiwan) Yu Yuk-geor | (England) David Hunt (England) Peter Penneket | (Taiwan) Lim Shour (Taiwan) Yu Yuk-geor | (England) David Hunt (England) Patricia Assinder |
| 1976 | (England) Peter Penneket | (Taiwan) Yu Yuk-geor | (England) David Hunt (England) Peter Penneket | (Taiwan) Lim Shour (Taiwan) Yu Yuk-geor | (Taiwan) Liao Kun-fu (Taiwan) Lim Shour |
| 1977 | (England) David Hunt | (Netherlands) Inge Rozemeijer | (England) Duncan Bridge (England) Brian Keeling | (Netherlands) Sylvia Robbe (Netherlands) Inge Rozemeijer | (England) David Hunt (England) Patricia Assinder |
| 1978 | (Socialist Federal Republic of Yugoslavia) Gregor Berden | (Scotland) Alison Bryson | (England) Andy Goode (New Zealand) Richard Purser | (Scotland) Elizabeth Adam (Scotland) M. Jack | (New Zealand) Richard Purser (England) Patricia Assinder |
| 1979 | (England) Andy Goode | (Scotland) Alison Bryson | (West Germany) Roland Maywald (West Germany) Karl-Heinz Zwiebler | (West Germany) Ingrid Morsch (West Germany) Vera Martini | (West Germany) Karl Heinz Zwiebler (West Germany) Ingrid Morsch |
| 1980 | (Denmark) Gert Helsholt | (Denmark) Pia Nielsen | (Denmark) Peter Holm (Denmark) Hans Olaf Birkholm | (West Germany) Marieluise Zizmann (Switzerland) Liselotte Blumer | (Denmark) Peter Holm (Denmark) Pia Nielsen |
| 1981 | (England) Steve Baddeley | (Soviet Union) Svetlana Belyasova | (England) Andy Goode (England) Steve Baddeley | (Soviet Union) Svetlana Belyasova (Soviet Union) Vart Pogosyan | (England) Nigel Tier (Scotland) Alison Fulton |
| 1982 | (Pakistan) Ahmed Zubair | (Canada) Denyse Julien | (Canada) Bob MacDougall (Canada) Mark Freitag | (Canada) Johanne Falardeau (Canada) Linda Cloutier | (Canada) Bob MacDougall (Canada) Johanne Falardeau |
| 1983 | (India) Vimal Kumar | (Scotland) Alison Fulton | (India) Partho Ganguli (India) Vikram Singh | (Scotland) Alison Fulton (England) Jill Benson | (West Germany) Stefan Frey (West Germany) Mechtild Hagemann |
| 1984 | (India) Vimal Kumar | (England) Wendy Poulton | (Belgium) Jan de Mulder (Belgium) Eddy van Herbruggen | (England) Wendy Poulton (France) Corinne Sonnet | (Belgium) Eddy van Herbruggen (England) Wendy Poulton |
| 1985 | (Denmark) Kim Brodersen | (Sweden) Maria Henning | (Denmark) Kim Brodersen (Denmark) Claus Thomsen | (Sweden) Maria Henning (Sweden) Lilian Johansson | (Denmark) Lars Noies (Denmark) Dorthe Lynge |
| 1986 | (New Zealand) Kerrin Harrison | (Australia) Julie McDonald | (New Zealand) Kerrin Harrison (New Zealand) Glenn Stewart | (France) Anne Meniane (France) Catharine Lechalupe | (New Zealand) Graeme Robson (Australia) Julie McDonald |
| 1987 | (Denmark) Ib Frederiksen | (South Korea) Kim Yun-ja | (South Korea) Lee Deuk-choon (South Korea) Kim Moon-soo | (South Korea) Chung Myung-hee (South Korea) Hwang Hye-young | (South Korea) Park Joo-bong (South Korea) Kim Yun-ja |
| 1988 | (Indonesia) Icuk Sugiarto | (South Korea) Hwang Hye-young | (South Korea) Park Joo-bong (South Korea) Sung Han-kuk | (South Korea) Chung Myung-hee (South Korea) Hwang Hye-young | (South Korea) Park Joo-bong (South Korea) Chung So-young |
| 1989 | (China) Xiong Guobao | (China) Li Lingwei | (China) Li Yongbo (China) Tian Bingyi | (China) Sun Xiaoqing (China) Zhou Lei | (China) Wang Pengren (China) Shi Fangjing |
| 1990 | (Malaysia) Foo Kok Keong | (South Korea) Hwang Hye-young | (South Korea) Park Joo-bong (South Korea) Kim Moon-soo | (South Korea) Chung Myung-hee (South Korea) Hwang Hye-young | (South Korea) Kim Moon-soo (South Korea) Chung So-young |
| 1991 | (Canada) Jaimie Dawson | (Canada) Doris Piché | (Malaysia) Yap Yee Hup (Malaysia) Yap Yee Guan | (Germany) Katrin Schmidt (Germany) Kerstin Ubben | (Germany) Michael Keck (Germany) Anne Katrin Seid |
| 1992 | (China) Wan Zhengwen | (Canada) Doris Piché | (China) Li Yongbo (China) Tian Bingyi | (Australia) Rhonda Cator (Australia) Anna Lao | (China) Liu Jianjun (China) Wang Xiaoyuan |
| 1993 | (Indonesia) Hendrawan | (China) Yao Yan | (Indonesia) Denny Kantono (Indonesia) Antonius Ariantho | (China) Yao Fen (China) Lin Yanfen | (Indonesia) Aryono Miranat (Indonesia) Eliza Nathanael |
| 1994 | (China) Sun Jun | (China) Zhang Ning | (Indonesia) Aras Razak (Indonesia) Amon Santoso | (Denmark) Helene Kirkegaard (Denmark) Rikke Olsen | (China) Liang Qing (China) Peng Yun |
| 1995 | (Indonesia) George Rimarcdi | (Russia) Elena Rybkina | (Indonesia) Sigit Budiarto (Indonesia) Dicky Purwotsugiono | (Sweden) Margit Borg (Sweden) Maria Bengtsson | (Denmark) Thomas Stavngaard (Denmark) Anne Søndergaard |
| 1996 | (Denmark) Kenneth Jonassen | (Sweden) Marina Andrievskaya | (Germany) Michael Keck (Germany) Dharma Gunawi | (Netherlands) Brenda Conijn (Netherlands) Nicole van Hooren | (Denmark) Jesper Larsen (Denmark) Majken Vange |
| 1997 | (Netherlands) Chris Bruil | (Wales) Kelly Morgan | (Indonesia) Tony Gunawan (Indonesia) Victor Wibowo | (Indonesia) Cynthia Tuwankotta (Indonesia) Etty Tantri | (England) Peter Jeffrey (England) Sarah Hardaker |
| 1998 | (Denmark) Niels Christian Kaldau | (India) Aparna Popat | (Denmark) Jan Jørgensen (Denmark) Ove Svejstrup | (Chinese Taipei) Tsai Hui-min (Chinese Taipei) Chen Li-chin | (Netherlands) Norbert van Barneveld (Netherlands) Lotte Jonathans |
| 1999 | (China) Chen Gang | (China) Zhou Mi | (England) Anthony Clark (England) Ian Sullivan | (China) Qin Yiyuan (China) Gao Ling | (China) Chen Gang (China) Qin Yiyuan |
| 2000 | (India) Siddharth Jain | (Japan) Takako Ida | (Japan) Keita Masuda (Japan) Tadashi Otsuka | (China) Li Xu (China) Hong Qian | (Malaysia) Chan Chong Ming (Malaysia) Joanne Quay |
| 2001 | (India) Abhinn Shyam Gupta | (Netherlands) Brenda Beenhakker | (France) Vincent Laigle (Bulgaria) Svetoslav Stoyanov | (Netherlands) Erica van den Heuvel (Netherlands) Nicole van Hooren | (Netherlands) Chris Bruil (Netherlands) Lotte Jonathans |
| 2002 | (China) Luo Yigang | (China) Xie Xingfang | (China) Cheng Rui (China) Wang Wei | (China) Zhang Yawen (China) Zhao Tingting | (China) Zheng Bo (China) Zhang Yawen |
| 2003 | (Germany) Marc Zwiebler | (France) Pi Hongyan | (Denmark) Joachim Fischer Nielsen (Denmark) Carsten Mogensen | (Japan) Yoshiko Iwata (Japan) Miyuki Tai | (Sweden) Jörgen Olsson (Sweden) Frida Andreasson |
| 2004 | (China) Chen Jin | (France) Pi Hongyan | (Malaysia) Gan Teik Chai (Malaysia) Koo Kien Keat | (China) Du Jing (China) Yu Yang | (China) Xie Zhongbo (China) Yu Yang |
| 2005 | (Russia) Stanislav Pukhov | (France) Pi Hongyan | (Denmark) Simon Mollyhus (Denmark) Anders Kristiansen | (France) Elodie Eymard (France) Weny Rahmawati | (France) Nabil Lasmari (Indonesia) Eny Widiowati |
| 2006 | No competition | | | | |
| 2007 | (Malaysia) Lee Chong Wei | (China) Xie Xingfang | (China) Cai Yun (China) Fu Haifeng | (China) Wei Yili (China) Zhang Yawen | (Indonesia) Flandy Limpele (Indonesia) Vita Marissa |
| 2008 | (Denmark) Peter Gade | (China) Wang Lin | (Indonesia) Markis Kido (Indonesia) Hendra Setiawan | (China) Du Jing (China) Yu Yang | (China) He Hanbin (China) Yu Yang |
| 2009 | (China) Lin Dan | (China) Wang Yihan | (Indonesia) Markis Kido (Indonesia) Hendra Setiawan | (China) Ma Jin (China) Wang Xiaoli | (Indonesia) Nova Widianto (Indonesia) Liliyana Natsir |
| 2010 | (Indonesia) Taufik Hidayat | (China) Wang Yihan | (Denmark) Mathias Boe (Denmark) Carsten Mogensen | (Thailand) Duanganong Aroonkesorn (Thailand) Kunchala Voravichitchaikul | (Thailand) Sudket Prapakamol (Thailand) Saralee Thungthongkam |
| 2011 | (Malaysia) Lee Chong Wei | (China) Wang Xin | (South Korea) Jung Jae-sung (South Korea) Lee Yong-dae | (China) Wang Xiaoli (China) Yu Yang | (Denmark) Joachim Fischer Nielsen (Denmark) Christinna Pedersen |
| 2012 | (Malaysia) Liew Daren | (Japan) Minatsu Mitani | (South Korea) Lee Yong-dae (South Korea) Ko Sung-hyun | (China) Ma Jin (China) Tang Jinhua | (China) Xu Chen (China) Ma Jin |
| 2013 | (Denmark) Jan Ø. Jørgensen | (China) Wang Shixian | (Indonesia) Markis Kido (Indonesia) Marcus Fernaldi Gideon | (China) Bao Yixin (China) Tang Jinhua | (China) Zhang Nan (China) Zhao Yunlei |
| 2014 | (Chinese Taipei) Chou Tien-chen | (China) Wang Shixian | (Denmark) Mathias Boe (Denmark) Carsten Mogensen | (China) Wang Xiaoli (China) Yu Yang | (Indonesia) Tontowi Ahmad (Indonesia) Liliyana Natsir |
| 2015 | (Malaysia) Lee Chong Wei | (Spain) Carolina Marín | (South Korea) Lee Yong-dae (South Korea) Yoo Yeon-seong | (China) Huang Yaqiong (China) Tang Jinhua | (South Korea) Ko Sung-hyun (South Korea) Kim Ha-na |
| 2016 | (China) Shi Yuqi | (China) He Bingjiao | (Denmark) Mathias Boe (Denmark) Carsten Mogensen | (China) Chen Qingchen (China) Jia Yifan | (China) Zheng Siwei (China) Chen Qingchen |
| 2017 | (India) Srikanth Kidambi | (Chinese Taipei) Tai Tzu-ying | (Chinese Taipei) Lee Jhe-huei (Chinese Taipei) Lee Yang | (Indonesia) Greysia Polii (Indonesia) Apriyani Rahayu | (Indonesia) Tontowi Ahmad (Indonesia) Liliyana Natsir |
| 2018 | (China) Chen Long | (Japan) Akane Yamaguchi | (China) Han Chengkai (China) Zhou Haodong | (Japan) Mayu Matsumoto (Japan) Wakana Nagahara | (China) Zheng Siwei (China) Huang Yaqiong |
| 2019 | (China) Chen Long | (South Korea) An Se-young | (Indonesia) Marcus Fernaldi Gideon (Indonesia) Kevin Sanjaya Sukamuljo | (South Korea) Lee So-hee (South Korea) Shin Seung-chan | (Indonesia) Praveen Jordan (Indonesia) Melati Daeva Oktavianti |
| 2020 | Cancelled (Note: This tournament, originally to be played from 20 to 25 October, was later cancelled due to the COVID-19 pandemic in France.) | | | | |
| 2021 | (Japan) Kanta Tsuneyama | (Japan) Akane Yamaguchi | (South Korea) Ko Sung-hyun (South Korea) Shin Baek-cheol | (South Korea) Lee So-hee (South Korea) Shin Seung-chan | (Japan) Yuta Watanabe (Japan) Arisa Higashino |
| 2022 | (Denmark) Viktor Axelsen | (China) He Bingjiao | (India) Satwiksairaj Rankireddy (India) Chirag Shetty | (Malaysia) Pearly Tan (Malaysia) Thinaah Muralitharan | (China) Zheng Siwei (China) Huang Yaqiong |
| 2023 | (Indonesia) Jonatan Christie | (China) Chen Yufei | (Denmark) Kim Astrup (Denmark) Anders Skaarup Rasmussen | (China) Liu Shengshu (China) Tan Ning | (China) Jiang Zhenbang (China) Wei Yaxin |
| 2024 | (China) Shi Yuqi | (South Korea) An Se-young | (India) Satwiksairaj Rankireddy (India) Chirag Shetty | (China) Chen Qingchen (China) Jia Yifan | (China) Feng Yanzhe (China) Huang Dongping |
| 2025 | (Denmark) Anders Antonsen | (South Korea) An Se-young | (South Korea) Kim Won-ho (South Korea) Seo Seung-jae | (Japan) Yuki Fukushima (Japan) Mayu Matsumoto | (China) Feng Yanzhe (China) Huang Dongping |
| 2026 | (France) Christo Popov | (South Korea) An Se-young | (Malaysia) Man Wei Chong (Malaysia) Tee Kai Wun | (Japan) Yuki Fukushima (Japan) Mayu Matsumoto | (China) Feng Yanzhe (China) Huang Dongping |

== Performances by nation ==
As of the 2026 edition

| | Nation | MS | WS | MD | WD | XD | Total |
|---|---|---|---|---|---|---|---|
| 1 | England | 14 | 25 | 17.5 | 26 | 22 | 104.5 |
| 2 | China | 11 | 15 | 5 | 17 | 16 | 64 |
| 3 | Denmark | 13 | 5 | 12.5 | 3.5 | 10.5 | 44.5 |
| 4 | France* | 7 | 9 | 8 | 12 | 8 | 44 |
| 5 | Malaya; Malaysia | 12 | 1 | 12 | 1.5 | 4.5 | 31 |
| 6 | Indonesia | 8 | | 9.5 | 2 | 7.5 | 27 |
| 7 | South Korea | | 7 | 8 | 5 | 4 | 24 |
| 8 | West Germany; Germany | 3 | 3 | 6 | 4 | 5 | 21 |
| 9 | Netherlands | 1 | 4 | | 5 | 3 | 13 |
| 10 | Japan | 1 | 4 | 1 | 4 | 1 | 11 |
| 10 | Scotland | 2 | 4 | | 2.5 | 2.5 | 11 |
| 12 | Sweden | 1 | 3 | 1 | 2.5 | 2.5 | 10 |
| 13 | India | 5 | 1 | 3.5 | | | 9.5 |
| 14 | Taiwan; Chinese Taipei | 1 | 3 | 1 | 3 | 1 | 9 |
| 15 | Canada | 1 | 4 | 1 | 1 | 1 | 8 |
| 16 | Irish Free State; Ireland | 3 | | 3 | | 1 | 7 |
| 17 | Thailand | 1 | 1 | | 1.5 | 1 | 4.5 |
| 18 | Belgium | 1 | | 1 | 0.5 | 1.5 | 4 |
| 18 | New Zealand | 1 | | 1.5 | 0.5 | 1 | 4 |
| 18 | Singapore | 3 | | 1 | | | 4 |
| 18 | Soviet Union; Russia | 1 | 2 | | 1 | | 4 |
| 22 | Australia | | 1 | | 1 | 0.5 | 2.5 |
| 23 | Wales | 1 | 1 | | | | 2 |
| 23 | United States | 1 | | 0.5 | | 0.5 | 2 |
| 25 | Pakistan | 1 | | | | | 1 |
| 25 | Spain | | 1 | | | | 1 |
| 25 | Switzerland | | | 0.5 | 0.5 | | 1 |
| 25 | Yugoslavia | 1 | | | | | 1 |
| 29 | Bulgaria | | | 0.5 | | | 0.5 |
| Total | | 94 | 94 | 94 | 94 | 94 | 470 |

* Host nation
