= Robert Mateusiak =

Polish badminton player (born 1976)

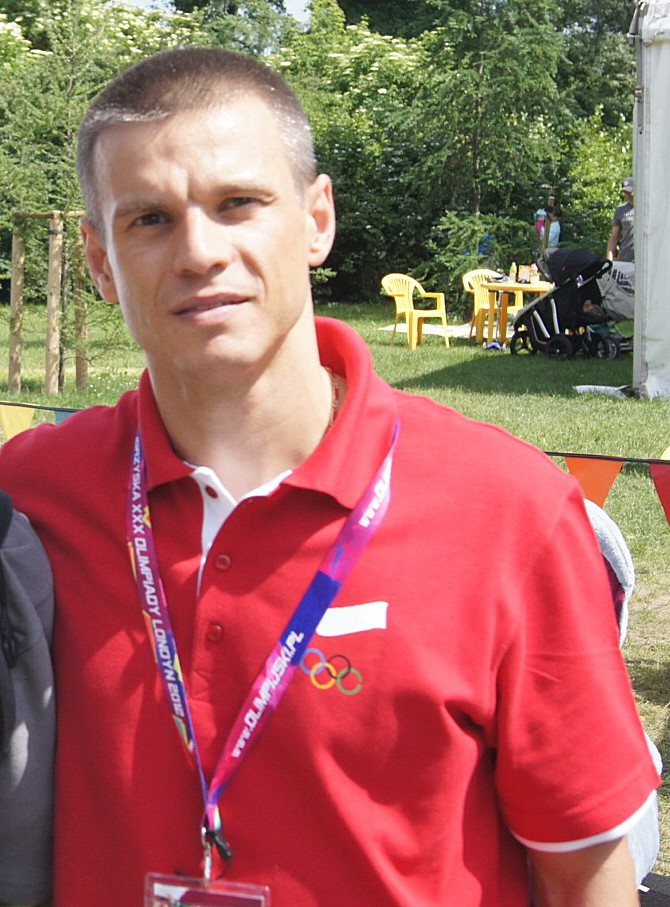

Personal information
- Born: Robert Bogumił Mateusiak; 13 January 1976 (age 50) Wołomin, Poland
- Height: 1.67 m (5 ft 6 in)
- Weight: 66 kg (146 lb)

Sport
- Country: Poland
- Sport: Badminton
- Handedness: Right
- Coached by: J Szulinski

Men's & mixed doubles
- Highest ranking: 1 (XD 26 August 2010)
- BWF profile
Medal record
Men's badminton
Representing Poland
European Championships
Gold medal – first place	2012 Karlskrona	Mixed doubles
Silver medal – second place	2008 Herning	Mixed doubles
Silver medal – second place	2010 Manchester	Mixed doubles
Bronze medal – third place	2000 Glasgow	Men's doubles
Bronze medal – third place	2002 Malmö	Men's doubles
Bronze medal – third place	2004 Geneva	Men's doubles
Bronze medal – third place	2006 Den Bosch	Mixed doubles
Bronze medal – third place	2006 Den Bosch	Men's doubles
European Mixed Team Championships
Bronze medal – third place	2008 Herning	Mixed team
European Men's Team Championships
Silver medal – second place	2010 Warsaw	Men's team

Robert Bogumił Mateusiak (born 13 January 1976) is a Polish retired badminton player.

== Career ==
Łogosz and Mateusiak won bronze medals at the European Championships in 2000, 2002, 2004, and 2006. Partnered with Nadieżda Zięba in the mixed doubles event, they won a silver medal at the 2008 European Badminton Championships and a gold medal at the 2012 European Badminton Championships.

Mateusiak competed in badminton at the 2000 and the 2004 Summer Olympics, both times in the men's doubles with partner Michał Łogosz. In 2000, they defeated David Bamford and Peter Blackburn of Australia in the first round. They lost in the round of 16 to Simon Archer and Nathan Robertson of United Kingdom. In 2004, they defeated Sigit Budiarto and Tri Kusharjanto of Indonesia in the first round, then were defeated in the round of 16 by Kim Dong-moon and Ha Tae-kwon of South Korea.

In 2008 Summer Olympics, Mateusiak competed in two events. He reached in to the quarter-finals round both in the men's doubles event with Łogosz and in the mixed doubles with Nadieżda Kostiuczyk (Zięba since 2010). In 2012 Summer Olympics, he competed in the mixed doubles with Zięba. They reached the quarter finals but were beaten by Xu Chen and Ma Jin of China. In 2016 Summer Olympics, he and Zięba advanced to the knocked-out stage after being at the top of the standings of group B. They were defeated by Chan Peng Soon and Goh Liu Ying of Malaysia in the quarter final.

== Achievements ==
=== European Championships ===
Men's doubles
Year	Venue	Partner	Opponent	Score	Result
2000	Kelvin Hall International Sports Arena; Glasgow, Scotland	(Poland) Michał Łogosz	(Sweden) Peter Axelsson (Sweden) Pär-Gunnar Jönsson	6–15, 15–10, 11–15	Bronze
2002	Baltiska hallen Malmö, Sweden	(Poland) Michał Łogosz	(Denmark) Jens Eriksen (Denmark) Martin Lundgaard Hansen	1–7, 6–8, 1–7	Bronze
2004	Queue d’Arve Sport Center; Geneva, Switzerland	(Poland) Michał Łogosz	(Denmark) Jens Eriksen (Denmark) Martin Lundgaard Hansen	9–15, 15–12, 6–15	Bronze
2006	Maaspoort Sports and Events; Den Bosch, Netherlands	(Poland) Michał Łogosz	(Denmark) Jens Eriksen (Denmark) Martin Lundgaard Hansen	19–21, 21–23	Bronze

Mixed doubles
Year	Venue	Partner	Opponent	Score	Result
2006	Maaspoort Sports and Events; Den Bosch, Netherlands	(Poland) Nadieżda Kostiuczyk	(Denmark) Thomas Laybourn (Denmark) Kamilla Rytter Juhl	16–21, 21–14, 21–23	Bronze
2008	Messecenter; Herning, Denmark	(Poland) Nadieżda Kostiuczyk	(England) Anthony Clark (England) Donna Kellogg	21–16, 20–22, 15–21	Silver
2010	Manchester Evening News Arena; Manchester, England	(Poland) Nadieżda Kostiuczyk	(Denmark) Thomas Laybourn (Denmark) Kamilla Rytter Juhl	19–21, 21–18, 12–21	Silver
2012	Telenor Arena; Karlskrona, Sweden	(Poland) Nadieżda Zięba	(Denmark) Mads Pieler Kolding (Denmark) Julie Houmann	21–12, 24–22	Gold

=== BWF Superseries (2 titles) ===
The BWF Superseries, which was launched on 14 December 2006 and implemented in 2007, was a series of elite badminton tournaments, sanctioned by the Badminton World Federation (BWF). BWF Superseries levels were Superseries and Superseries Premier. A season of Superseries consisted of twelve tournaments around the world that had been introduced since 2011. Successful players were invited to the Superseries Finals, which were held at the end of each year.

Mixed doubles
Year	Tournament	Partner	Opponent	Score	Result
2009	Hong Kong Open	(Poland) Nadieżda Kostiuczyk	(Indonesia) Nova Widianto (Indonesia) Liliyana Natsir	22–20, 21–16	(gold) Winner
2010	Indonesia Open	(Poland) Nadieżda Zięba	(Indonesia) Hendra Setiawan (Russia) Anastasia Russkikh	21–18, 22–20	(gold) Winner

BWF Super Series Finals tournament
BWF Super Series Premier tournament
BWF Super Series tournament

=== BWF Grand Prix (6 titles, 3 runners-up) ===
The BWF Grand Prix had two levels, the Grand Prix and Grand Prix Gold. It was a series of badminton tournaments sanctioned by the Badminton World Federation (BWF) and played between 2007 and 2017. The World Badminton Grand Prix was sanctioned by the International Badminton Federation from 1983 to 2006.

Men's doubles
Year	Tournament	Partner	Opponent	Score	Result
1994	Russian Open	(Poland) Damian Pławecki	(Russia) Sergei Melnikov (Russia) Nikolay Zuev	9–15, 2–15	(silver) Runner-up
1999	Polish Open	(Poland) Michał Łogosz	(Hong Kong) Ma Che Kong (Hong Kong) Yau Tsz Yuk	15–13, 7–15, 15–9	(gold) Winner
2006	Bitburger Open	(Poland) Michał Łogosz	(Indonesia) Joko Riyadi (Indonesia) Hendra Aprida Gunawan	21–13, 21–13	(gold) Winner

Mixed doubles
Year	Tournament	Partner	Opponent	Score	Result
2005	Dutch Open	(Poland) Nadieżda Kostiuczyk	(Germany) Ingo Kindervater (Germany) Kathrin Piotrowski	15–5, 15–5	(gold) Winner
2006	Bitburger Open	(Poland) Nadieżda Kostiuczyk	(Singapore) Hendri Saputra (Singapore) Li Yujia	22–24, 21–16, 21–8	(gold) Winner
2007	Russian Open	(Poland) Nadieżda Kostiuczyk	(China) He Hanbin (China) Yu Yang	25–23, 13–21, 21–13	(gold) Winner
2012	Bitburger Open	(Poland) Nadieżda Zięba	(Denmark) Anders Kristiansen (Denmark) Julie Houmann	11–21, 16–21	(silver) Runner-up
2015	Bitburger Open	(Poland) Nadieżda Zięba	(England) Chris Adcock (England) Gabby Adcock	21–18, 21–17	(gold) Winner
2016	U.S. Open	(Poland) Nadieżda Zięba	(Japan) Yugo Kobayashi (Japan) Wakana Nagahara	18–21, 14–21	(silver) Runner-up

BWF Grand Prix Gold tournament
BWF Grand Prix tournament

=== BWF International Challenge/Series (41 titles, 16 runners-up) ===
Men's doubles
Year	Tournament	Partner	Opponent	Score	Result
1994	Czech International	(Poland) Damian Pławecki	(Denmark) Claus Simonsen (Denmark) Henrik Sørensen	4–15, 10–15	(silver) Runner-up
1994	Hungarian International	(Poland) Damian Pławecki	(Germany) Kai Mitteldorf (Germany) Uwe Ossenbrink	15–9, 4–15, 17–14	(gold) Winner
1994	Bulgarian International	(Poland) Damian Pławecki	(Bulgaria) Mihail Popov (Bulgaria) Svetoslav Stoyanov	15–8, 15–8	(gold) Winner
1995	Amor International	(Poland) Damian Pławecki	(Denmark) Allan Borch (Denmark) Janek Roos	18–14, 6–15, 4–15	(silver) Runner-up
1998	Hungarian International	(Poland) Michał Łogosz	(Denmark) Joachim Fischer Nielsen (Denmark) Kasper Ødum	11–15, 15–8, 15–4	(gold) Winner
1999	French International	(Poland) Michał Łogosz	(England) Anthony Clark (England) Ian Sullivan	11–15, 10–15	(silver) Runner-up
2000	Dutch International	(Poland) Michał Łogosz	(Bulgaria) Mihail Popov (Bulgaria) Svetoslav Stoyanov	11–15, 15–9, 9–15	(silver) Runner-up
2000	Croatian International	(Poland) Michał Łogosz	(Bulgaria) Mihail Popov (Bulgaria) Svetoslav Stoyanov	17–16, 13–15, 15–12	(gold) Winner
2000	Victorian International	(Poland) Michał Łogosz	(China) Dong Jiong (China) Jiang Xin	15–10, 17–15	(gold) Winner
2001	Spanish International	(Poland) Michał Łogosz	(Spain) José Antonio Crespo (Spain) Sergio Llopis	15–3, 15–10	(gold) Winner
2001	Croatian International	(Poland) Michał Łogosz	(Germany) Kristof Hopp (Germany) Thomas Tesche	7–15, 13–15	(silver) Runner-up
2001	Austrian International	(Poland) Michał Łogosz	(Denmark) Mathias Boe (Denmark) Thomas Hovgaard	15–13, 15–3	(gold) Winner
2002	Portugal International	(Poland) Michał Łogosz	(England) Peter Jeffrey (England) Ian Palethorpe	8–7, 7–2, 7–3	(gold) Winner
2002	Polish International	(Poland) Michał Łogosz	(Denmark) Jesper Thomsen (Denmark) Tommy Sørensen	1–7, 7–3, 7–3, 3–7, 7–3	(gold) Winner
2002	Slovak International	(Poland) Michał Łogosz	(Russia) Stanislav Pukhov (Russia) Nikolai Zuyev	10–15, 15–8, 12–15	(silver) Runner-up
2003	Polish International	(Poland) Michał Łogosz	(Sweden) Imanuel Hirschfeld (Sweden) Jörgen Olsson	11–15, 15–2, 15–1	(gold) Winner
2003	Austrian International	(Poland) Michał Łogosz	(Russia) Stanislav Pukhov (Russia) Nikolay Zuev	15–6, 16–17, 15–11	(gold) Winner
2003	Scottish International	(Poland) Michał Łogosz	(France) Vincent Laigle (France) Svetoslav Stoyanov	15–5, 15–3	(gold) Winner
2003	Bitburger International	(Poland) Michał Łogosz	(France) Vincent Laigle (France) Svetoslav Stoyanov	15–5, 15–9	(gold) Winner
2004	Swedish International	(Poland) Michał Łogosz	(Denmark) Joachim Fischer Nielsen (Denmark) Jesper Larsen	4–15, 15–13, 15–12	(gold) Winner
2004	Polish International	(Poland) Michał Łogosz	(China) Guo Zhendong (China) Xie Zhongbo	15–8, 14–17, 14–17	(silver) Runner-up
2005	Finnish International	(Poland) Michał Łogosz	(Sweden) Henrik Andersson (Sweden) Fredrik Bergström	6–15, 12–15	(silver) Runner-up
2005	Polish International	(Poland) Michał Łogosz	(Wales) Matthew Hughes (Wales) Martyn Lewis	15–9, 15–7	(gold) Winner
2006	Polish International	(Poland) Michał Łogosz	(Wales) Matthew Hughes (Wales) Martyn Lewis	21–18, 21–17	(gold) Winner
2007	Bulgarian International	(Poland) Michał Łogosz	(France) Erwin Kehlhoffner (France) Svetoslav Stoyanov	Walkover	(gold) Winner
2008	Polish International	(Poland) Michał Łogosz	(Poland) Adam Cwalina (Poland) Wojciech Szkudlarczyk	21–16, 21–5	(gold) Winner
2008	White Nights	(Poland) Michał Łogosz	(Russia) Vitalij Durkin (Russia) Aleksandr Nikolaenko	21–6, 21–7	(gold) Winner

Mixed doubles
Year	Tournament	Partner	Opponent	Score	Result
2002	Polish International	(Poland) Paulina Matusewicz	(Canada) Mike Beres (Canada) Kara Solmundson	7–1, 4–7, 3–7, 1–7	(silver) Runner-up
2003	Polish International	(Poland) Kamila Augustyn	(Sweden) Jörgen Olsson (Sweden) Frida Andreasson	7–11, 13–11, 11–4	(gold) Winner
2005	Finnish International	(Poland) Nadieżda Kostiuczyk	(Germany) Jochen Cassel (Germany) Birgit Overzier	15–4, 15–5	(gold) Winner
2005	Polish International	(Poland) Nadieżda Kostiuczyk	(Poland) Michał Łogosz (Poland) Kamila Augustyn	15–3, 15–6	(gold) Winner
2006	Polish International	(Poland) Nadieżda Kostiuczyk	(Russia) Vitalij Durkin (Russia) Valeria Sorokina	21–4, 9–21, 21–13	(gold) Winner
2007	Polish International	(Poland) Nadieżda Kostiuczyk	(Germany) Tim Dettmann (Germany) Annekatrin Lillie	21–19, 17–21, 21–19	(gold) Winner
2008	White Nights	(Poland) Nadieżda Kostiuczyk	(Russia) Vitalij Durkin (Russia) Nina Vislova	18–21, 14–21	(silver) Runner-up
2009	Le Volant d'Or de Toulouse	(Poland) Nadieżda Kostiuczyk	(Denmark) Rasmus Bonde (Denmark) Britta Andersen	21–10, 21–11	(gold) Winner
2009	Bulgarian International	(Poland) Nadieżda Kostiuczyk	(Poland) Adam Cwalina (Poland) Małgorzata Kurdelska	21–18, 21–9	(gold) Winner
2011	Polish Open	(Poland) Nadieżda Zięba	(Poland) Rafał Hawel (Poland) Kamila Augustyn	21–13, 21–17	(gold) Winner
2012	Dutch International	(Poland) Nadieżda Zięba	(Russia) Andrej Ashmarin (Russia) Anastasia Panushkina	21–10, 21–19	(gold) Winner
2013	Polish Open	(Poland) Nadieżda Zięba	(Poland) Wojciech Szkudlarczyk (Poland) Agnieszka Wojtkowska	15–21, 21–16, 21–14	(gold) Winner
2013	Bulgarian International	(Poland) Agnieszka Wojtkowska	(Scotland) Robert Blair (Scotland) Imogen Bankier	17–21, 15–21	(silver) Runner-up
2013	Puerto Rico International	(Poland) Agnieszka Wojtkowska	(France) Laurent Constantin (France) Laura Choinet	21–13, 21–8	(gold) Winner
2014	Austrian International	(Poland) Agnieszka Wojtkowska	(Malaysia) Chan Peng Soon (Malaysia) Lai Pei Jing	21–15, 15–21, 21–16	(gold) Winner
2014	Polish Open	(Poland) Agnieszka Wojtkowska	(Russia) Vitalij Durkin (Russia) Nina Vislova	15–21, 7–16 retired	(silver) Runner-up
2014	Spanish Open	(Poland) Agnieszka Wojtkowska	(Scotland) Robert Blair (Scotland) Imogen Bankier	13–21, 21–14, 16–21	(silver) Runner-up
2014	White Nights	(Poland) Agnieszka Wojtkowska	(Russia) Evgenij Dremin (Russia) Evgenia Dimova	17–21, 12–21	(silver) Runner-up
2014	Polish International	(Poland) Agnieszka Wojtkowska	(Ukraine) Gennadiy Natarov (Ukraine) Yuliya Kazarinova	11–9, 11–5, 11–7	(gold) Winner
2015	White Nights	(Poland) Nadieżda Zięba	(Republic of Ireland) Sam Magee (Republic of Ireland) Chloe Magee	18–21, 17–21	(silver) Runner-up
2015	Lagos International	(Poland) Nadieżda Zięba	(India) Tarun Kona (India) N. Sikki Reddy	21–19, 21–7	(gold) Winner
2015	Kharkiv International	(Poland) Nadieżda Zięba	(France) Gaëtan Mittelheisser (France) Audrey Fontaine	21–14, 21–14	(gold) Winner
2015	Belgian International	(Poland) Nadieżda Zięba	(Sweden) Jonathan Nordh (Sweden) Emelie Fabbeke	15–21, 21–6, 21–8	(gold) Winner
2015	Bulgarian International	(Poland) Nadieżda Zięba	(Russia) Evgenij Dremin (Russia) Evgenia Dimova	21–14, 21–18	(gold) Winner
2015	Irish Open	(Poland) Nadieżda Zięba	(Denmark) Mathias Christiansen (Denmark) Lena Grebak	21–19, 18–21, 18–21	(silver) Runner-up
2015	Mersin Turkey International	(Poland) Nadieżda Zięba	(Australia) Matthew Chau (Australia) Gronya Somerville	21–12, 21–13	(gold) Winner
2016	Swedish Masters	(Poland) Nadieżda Zięba	(Denmark) Mathias Christiansen (Denmark) Lena Grebak	21–10, 21–13	(gold) Winner
2016	Polish Open	(Poland) Nadieżda Zięba	(Malaysia) Tan Kian Meng (Malaysia) Lai Pei Jing	21–11, 21–16	(gold) Winner
2016	Welsh International	(Poland) Nadieżda Zięba	(Malaysia) Goh Soon Huat (Malaysia) Shevon Jemie Lai	21–16, 11–21, 21–18	(gold) Winner
2017	Polish Open	(Poland) Nadieżda Zięba	(Chinese Taipei) Tseng Min-hao (Chinese Taipei) Hu Ling-fang	20–22, 22–20, 21–13	(gold) Winner

BWF International Challenge tournament
BWF International Series tournament
BWF Future Series tournament

== Record against selected opponents ==
Mixed doubles results with Nadieżda Zięba against year-end Finals finalists, World Championships semi-finalists, and Olympic quarter-finalists.

Players	M	W	L	Diff.
(China) He Hanbin & Yu Yang	7	3	4	–1
(China) Xie Zhongbo & Zhang Yawen	1	0	1	–1
(China) Xu Chen & Ma Jin	6	1	5	–4
(China) Zhang Jun & Gao Ling	1	0	1	–1
(China) Zheng Bo & Gao Ling	5	0	5	–5
(China) Zheng Bo & Ma Jin	1	0	1	–1
(Chinese Taipei) Lee Sheng-mu & Chien Yu-chin	2	1	1	0
(Denmark) Jens Eriksen & Mette Schjoldager	1	0	1	–1
(Denmark) Joachim Fischer Nielsen & Christinna Pedersen	6	2	4	–2
(Denmark) Thomas Laybourn & Kamilla Rytter Juhl	4	0	4	–4
(England) Chris Adcock & Gabby Adcock	6	3	3	0
(England) Chris Adcock & (Scotland) Imogen Bankier	1	1	0	+1
(England) Anthony Clark & Donna Kellogg	4	1	3	–2
(England) Nathan Robertson & Gail Emms	3	1	2	–1
(Germany) Michael Fuchs & Birgit Michels	3	2	1	+1

Players	M	W	L	Diff.
(Hong Kong) Lee Chun Hei & Chau Hoi Wah	1	1	0	+1
(India) Valiyaveetil Diju & Jwala Gutta	3	1	2	–1
(Indonesia) Tontowi Ahmad & Liliyana Natsir	2	0	2	–2
(Indonesia) Praveen Jordan & Debby Susanto	1	1	0	+1
(Indonesia) Nova Widianto & Vita Marissa	2	2	0	+2
(Indonesia) Nova Widianto & Liliyana Natsir	4	2	2	0
(Japan) Yuta Watanabe & Arisa Higashino	1	0	1	–1
(Malaysia) Chan Peng Soon & Goh Liu Ying	6	2	4	–2
(New Zealand) Daniel Shirley & Sara Runesten-Petersen	1	1	0	+1
(South Korea) Ko Sung-hyun & Ha Jung-eun	2	1	1	0
(South Korea) Lee Yong-dae & Lee Hyo-jung	1	0	1	–1
(South Korea) Shin Baek-cheol & Eom Hye-won	1	1	0	+1
(Sweden) Fredrik Bergström & Johanna Persson	2	2	0	+2
(Thailand) Sudket Prapakamol & Saralee Thungthongkam	3	1	2	–1

== See also ==
- List of athletes with the most appearances at Olympic Games
