= Jörgen Olsson (badminton) =

Swedish badminton player (born 1976)

Personal information
- Born: 20 March 1976 (age 50)
- Height: 1.96 m (6 ft 5 in)

Sport
- Country: Sweden
- Sport: Badminton
- Handedness: Right
- Coached by: Johan Blom
- Event: Doubles

Doubles
- BWF profile

Jörgen Olsson (born 20 March 1976) is a retired Swedish badminton player from Göteborgs BK club. He also once played for Askim BC club. He has represented Sweden in World Championships and is a 2-time national Champion having won the titles in 2002 and 2004 in mixed doubles with Frida Andreasson and Johanna Persson respectively.

== Achievements ==
=== IBF/BWF International ===
Men's doubles
Year	Tournament	Partner	Opponent	Score	Result
2004	Slovak International	(Sweden) Imanuel Hirschfeld	(Russia) Nikolai Zuyev (Russia) Sergey Ivlev	13–15, 15–6, 7–15	(silver) Runner-up
2004	Bulgarian International	(Sweden) Imanuel Hirschfeld	(Indonesia) Aji Basuki Sindoro (Indonesia) Ruben Gordown Khosadalina	10–15, 14–17	(silver) Runner-up
2004	Finnish International	(Sweden) Imanuel Hirschfeld	(Russia) Evgenij Isakov (Russia) Sergey Ivlev	15–5, 8–15, 4–15	(silver) Runner-up
2003	Polish International	(Sweden) Imanuel Hirschfeld	(Poland) Michał Łogosz (Poland) Robert Mateusiak	15–11, 2–15, 1–15	(silver) Runner-up
2002	Norwegian International	(Sweden) Imanuel Hirschfeld	(Russia) Alexandr Nikolaenko (Russia) Nikolaj Nikolaenko	9–15, 13–15	(silver) Runner-up
2002	Czech International	(Sweden) Imanuel Hirschfeld	(Bulgaria) Svetoslav Stoyanov (France) Vincent Laigle	11–15, 6–15	(silver) Runner-up

Mixed doubles
Year	Tournament	Partner	Opponent	Score	Result
2003	Spanish International	(Sweden) Frida Andreasson	(England) Robert Blair (England) Natalie Munt	16–17, 10–15	(silver) Runner-up
2003	Polish International	(Sweden) Frida Andreasson	(Poland) Robert Mateusiak (Poland) Kamila Augustyn	11–7, 11–13, 11–4	(gold) Winner
2003	French International	(Sweden) Frida Andreasson	(Denmark) Carsten Mogensen (Denmark) Kamilla Rytter Juhl	5–11, 11–9, 11–7	(gold) Winner
2002	Irish International	(Sweden) Frida Andreasson	(England) Peter Jeffrey (England) Suzanne Rayappan	7–11, 11–6, 7–11	(silver) Runner-up
2002	Norwegian International	(Sweden) Frida Andreasson	(Sweden) Joachim Fellenius (Sweden) Jenny Kruseborn	7–2, 7–8, 5–7, ?, ?	(gold) Winner
2001	Norwegian International	(Sweden) Frida Andreasson	(Denmark) Tommy Sørensen (Denmark) Karina Sørensen	7–2, 7–8, 5–7, 7–4, 5–7	(silver) Runner-up
