= Peter Jeffrey (badminton) =

English badminton player

Personal information
- Born: 28 July 1975 (age 51)
- Height: 1.85 m (6 ft 1 in)

Sport
- Country: England
- Sport: Badminton
- Handedness: Right
- Retired: in 2005
- Event: doubles

doubles
- BWF profile

Peter Jeffrey (born 28 July 1975) is a retired English badminton player. He served as the head coach of Badminton England from 2017 to 2022. He was also the head doubles coach for the French Badminton Federation, but now retired.

== Achievements ==
=== IBF International ===
Men's doubles
| Year | Tournament | Partner | Opponent | Score | Result |
|---|---|---|---|---|---|
| 2004 | Iceland International | (England) Chris Tonks | (England) Ian Palethorpe (England) Paul Trueman | 17–14, 13–15, 15–17 | (silver) Runner-up |
| 2002 | Irish International | (England) Julian Robertson | (England) Robert Blair (England) Ian Palethorpe | 5–15, 17–14, 9–15 | (silver) Runner-up |
| 2002 | Welsh International | (England) Julian Robertson | (Russia) Nikolai Zuyev (Russia) Stanislav Pukhov | 3–15, 11–15 | (silver) Runner-up |
| 2002 | Austrian International | (England) Ian Palethorpe | (England) James Anderson (England) Robert Blair | 2–7, 3–7, 5–7 | (silver) Runner-up |
| 2002 | Dutch International | (England) Ian Palethorpe | (New Zealand) Daniel Shirley (New Zealand) John Gordon | 3–7, 4–7, 5–7 | (silver) Runner-up |
| 2002 | Portugal International | (England) Ian Palethorpe | (Poland) Michał Łogosz (Poland) Robert Mateusiak | 7–8, 2–7, 3–7 | (silver) Runner-up |
| 2001 | Bulgarian International | (England) Ian Palethorpe | (England) Kristian Roebuck (England) Paul Trueman | 7–5, 2–7, 7–1, ?, ? | (gold) Winner |
| 2001 | French International | (England) David Lindley | (France) Vincent Laigle (Bulgaria) Svetoslav Stoyanov | 1–7, 2–7, 2–7 | (silver) Runner-up |
| 2000 | Iceland International | (England) David Lindley | (England) Stephen Foster (England) Ian Palethorpe | 15–10, 9–15, 15–11 | (gold) Winner |
| 2000 | Scottish International | (England) David Lindley | (Japan) Yousuke Nakanishi (Japan) Shinya Ohtsuka | 15–7, 12–15, 15–12 | (gold) Winner |
| 1998 | Irish International | (England) Graham Hurrell | (Bulgaria) Mihail Popov (Bulgaria) Svetoslav Stoyanov | 11–15, 15–8, 6–15 | (silver) Runner-up |
| 1998 | Slovak International | (England) Graham Hurrell | (England) Anthony Clark (England) Ian Sullivan | 8–15, 15–12, 15–7 | (gold) Winner |
| 1998 | Czech International | (England) Graham Hurrell | (France) Manuel Dubrulle (France) Vincent Laigle | 17–16, 15–7 | (gold) Winner |
| 1997 | Irish International | (England) Graham Hurrell | (England) Ian Sullivan (England) James Anderson | 2–15, 15–10, 7–15 | (silver) Runner-up |
| 1997 | Mauritius International | (England) Graham Hurrell | (Malaysia) Khoo Boo Hock (Malaysia) Theam Teow Lim | 15–10, 15–7 | (gold) Winner |

Mixed doubles
| Year | Tournament | Partner | Opponent | Score | Result |
|---|---|---|---|---|---|
| 2004 | Iceland International | (England) Hayley Connor | (Scotland) Graeme Smith (Scotland) Yuan Wemyss | 15–7, 7–15, 15–13 | (gold) Winner |
| 2004 | Slovak International | (England) Hayley Connor | (Russia) Nikolai Zuyev (Russia) Marina Yakusheva | 4–15, 2–15 | (silver) Runner-up |
| 2002 | Irish International | (England) Suzanne Rayappan | (Sweden) Jörgen Olsson (Sweden) Frida Andreasson | 11–7, 6–11, 11–7 | (gold) Winner |
| 2002 | Dutch International | (England) Suzanne Rayappan | (Australia) Travis Denney (Australia) Kate Wilson-Smith | 0–7, 7–3, 6–8, 7–2, 7–5 | (gold) Winner |
| 2001 | La Chaux-de-fonds International | (England) Suzanne Rayappan | (England) Paul Trueman (England) Liza Parker | 7–3, 7–2, 4–7, 7–4 | (gold) Winner |
| 2001 | Spanish International | (England) Suzanne Rayappan | (Slovenia) Andrej Pohar (Slovenia) Maja Pohar | 15–13, 15–7 | (gold) Winner |
| 2000 | Scottish International | (England) Suzanne Rayappan | (England) David Lindley (England) Emma Constable | 15–13, 6–15, 15–13 | (gold) Winner |
| 1999 | Welsh International | (England) Joanne Davies | (Sweden) Johanna Persson (Sweden) Ola Molin | 11–15, 15–5, 15–13 | (gold) Winner |
| 1997 | Mauritius International | (Scotland) Kirsteen McEwan | (England) Graham Hurrell (England) Wendy Taylor | 15–6, 15–5 | (gold) Winner |
| 1997 | French International | (England) Sara Hardaker | (Scotland) Kenny Middlemiss (Scotland) Elinor Middlemiss | 15–8, 15–11 | (gold) Winner |
