= Thomas Tesche =

German badminton player (born 1978)

Personal information
- Born: 27 December 1978 (age 47)
- Height: 1.75 m (5 ft 9 in)

Sport
- Country: Germany
- Sport: Badminton
- Handedness: Right
- Event: Men's doubles

Men's doubles
- BWF profile
Medal record
Men's badminton
Representing Germany
European Junior Championships
Bronze medal – third place	1997 Nymburk	Boys' doubles

Thomas Tesche (born 27 December 1978) is a German badminton player. He is the twin brother of Joachim Tesche, another former German badminton player. Thomas Tesche holds a degree in business administration from the University of Saarland in Saarbrücken, in business taxation, auditing and banking. Afterwards he completed his studies, he worked for 5 years as a research assistant at the Center for Accounting and Auditing at the University of Saarland in the area of accounting-related consultancy, as well as (co-)authoring numerous publications dealing with accounting issues.

== Achievements ==
=== European Junior Championships ===
Boys' doubles
Year	Venue	Partner	Opponent	Score	Result
1997	Nymburk, Czech Republic	(Germany) Joachim Tesche	(Denmark) Kristian Langbak (Denmark) Frederik Köhler	6–15, 4–15	Bronze

=== IBF/BWF International ===
Men's doubles
Year	Tournament	Partner	Opponent	Score	Result
1999	Austrian International	(Germany) Kristof Hopp	(Bulgaria) Mihail Popov (Bulgaria) Svetoslav Stoyanov	15–9, 6–15, 4–15	(silver) Runner-up
1999	Bulgarian International	(Germany) Kristof Hopp	(Germany) Joachim Tesche (Germany) Christian Mohr	11–15, 6–15	(silver) Runner-up
1999	Le Volant d'Or de Toulouse	(Germany) Kristof Hopp	(Bulgaria) Mihail Popov (Bulgaria) Svetoslav Stoyanov	5–15, 15–11, 10–15	(silver) Runner-up
2000	Le Volant d'Or de Toulouse	(Germany) Kristof Hopp	(France) Vincent Laigle (Bulgaria) Svetoslav Stoyanov	5–15, 9–15	(silver) Runner-up
2001	Croatian International	(Germany) Kristof Hopp	(Poland) Michał Łogosz (Poland) Robert Mateusiak	15–7, 15–13	(gold) Winner
2003	South Africa International	(Germany) Kristof Hopp	(Germany) Joachim Tesche (Germany) Jochen Cassel	15–8, 15–12	(gold) Winner
2006	Irish International	(Germany) Jochen Cassel	(Denmark) Kasper Hendriksen (Denmark) Rasmus Bonde	21–16, 21–19	(gold) Winner
2007	Mauritius International	(Germany) Jochen Cassel	(South Africa) Chris Dednam (South Africa) Roelof Dednam	21–13, 21–14	(gold) Winner
2007	Bahrain Satellite	(Germany) Jochen Cassel	(Malaysia) Azahar Azrihanif (Malaysia) Goh Ying Jin	21–15, 21–18	(gold) Winner
2007	Croatian International	(Germany) Jochen Cassel	(Belgium) Wouter Claes (Belgium) Frédéric Mawet	21–11, 20–22, 19–21	(silver) Runner-up
2007	Hatzor International	(Germany) Jochen Cassel	(Bulgaria) Stiliyan Makarski (Bulgaria) Vladimir Metodiev	21–19, 21–13	(gold) Winner
2007	White Nights	(Germany) Jochen Cassel	(Russia) Vitalij Durkin (Russia) Aleksandr Nikolaenko	17–21, 15–21	(silver) Runner-up
2007	Canadian Open	(Germany) Jochen Cassel	(Canada) William Milroy (Canada) Mike Beres	17–21, 14–21	(silver) Runner-up
