= Mihail Popov =

Bulgarian badminton player

Personal information
- Born: 16 April 1976 (age 50) Sofia, Bulgaria
- Height: 1.77 m (5 ft 10 in)
- Weight: 72 kg (159 lb)

Sport
- Country: France
- Sport: Badminton
- Handedness: Right
- Event: Men's singles and doubles

Men's singles and doubles
- BWF profile

Mihail Popov (Bulgarian: Михаил Попов; born 16 April 1976) is a former Bulgarian badminton player, and later represented France. He represented Bulgaria at the 2000 Summer Olympics in the men's singles and doubles event. He now works as a Bulgarian national badminton coach. Popov had won seven Bulgarian National Championships title, 3 in the singles event, and four in the men's doubles event partnered with Svetoslav Stoyanov. In France, he clinched two times men's doubles national title in 2004 partnered with Manuel Dubrulle, and in 2007 with Stoyanov.

== Achievements ==
=== IBF World Grand Prix ===
The World Badminton Grand Prix was sanctioned by the International Badminton Federation from 1983 to 2006.

Men's doubles
| Year | Tournament | Partner | Opponent | Score | Result |
|---|---|---|---|---|---|
| 2000 | Polish Open | (Bulgaria) Svetoslav Stoyanov | (Malaysia) Chang Kim Wai (Malaysia) Hong Chieng Hun | 15–13, 5–15, 5–15 | (silver) Runner-up |

=== IBF International ===
Men's singles
| Year | Tournament | Opponent | Score | Result |
|---|---|---|---|---|
| 1996 | Romanian International | (Bulgaria) Jasen Borisov | 15–5, 18–13 | (gold) Winner |
| 1992 | Bulgarian International | (Commonwealth of Independent States) Anatoliy Skripko | 5–15, 3–15 | (silver) Runner-up |

Men's doubles
| Year | Tournament | Partner | Opponent | Score | Result |
|---|---|---|---|---|---|
| 2006 | Cyprus International | (France) Svetoslav Stoyanov | (Denmark) Jacob Chemnitz (Denmark) Mikkel Delbo Larsen | 14–21, 13–21 | (silver) Runner-up |
| 2006 | Belgian International | (France) Svetoslav Stoyanov | (Sweden) Imanuel Hirschfeld (Indonesia) Imam Sodikin | 19–21, 13–21 | (silver) Runner-up |
| 2005 | Irish International | (France) Svetoslav Stoyanov | (Germany) Michael Fuchs (Germany) Roman Spitko | 9–15, 15–5, 15–9 | (gold) Winner |
| 2005 | Scottish International | (France) Svetoslav Stoyanov | (Indonesia) Imam Sodikin (Indonesia) Andy Hartono Tandaputra | 14–17, 15–10, 7–15 | (silver) Runner-up |
| 2005 | Hungarian International | (France) Svetoslav Stoyanov | (Austria) Jürgen Koch (Austria) Peter Zauner | 5–15, 9–15 | (silver) Runner-up |
| 2005 | Bulgarian International | (France) Svetoslav Stoyanov | (Sweden) Daniel Glaser (Sweden) Joakim Hansson | 15–4, 15–1 | (gold) Winner |
| 2004 | Irish International | (France) Bertrand Gallet | (England) Ruben Gordown Khosadalina (England) Aji Basuki Sindoro | 10–15, 6–15 | (silver) Runner-up |
| 2003 | Irish International | (France) Manuel Dubrulle | (France) Vincent Laigle (France) Svetoslav Stoyanov | 5–15, 8–15 | (silver) Runner-up |
| 2003 | Czech International | (France) Manuel Dubrulle | (Denmark) Thomas Røjkjær Jensen (Denmark) Tommy Sørensen | 15–10, 15–3 | (gold) Winner |
| 2002 | Le Volant d'Or de Toulouse | (France) Manuel Dubrulle | (France) Vincent Laigle (France) Svetoslav Stoyanov | 4–15, 2–15 | (silver) Runner-up |
| 2001 | BMW International | (France) Manuel Dubrulle | (Denmark) Michael Lamp (Denmark) Michael Søgaard | 3–7, 7–5, 4–7, 0–7 | (silver) Runner-up |
| 2001 | La Chaux-de-Fonds International | (France) Manuel Dubrulle | (France) Vincent Laigle (Bulgaria) Svetoslav Stoyanov | 4–7, 2–7, 1–7 | (silver) Runner-up |
| 2001 | Croatian International | (France) Manuel Dubrulle | (France) Vincent Laigle (Bulgaria) Svetoslav Stoyanov | 2–7, 4–7, 6–8 | (silver) Runner-up |
| 2001 | Welsh International | (France) Manuel Dubrulle | (France) Vincent Laigle (Bulgaria) Svetoslav Stoyanov | 2–7, 7–5, 3–7, 7–4, 3–7 | (silver) Runner-up |
| 2001 | Czech International | (France) Manuel Dubrulle | (France) Vincent Laigle (Bulgaria) Svetoslav Stoyanov | 7–3, 7–3, 7–1 | (gold) Winner |
| 2000 | Croatian International | (Bulgaria) Svetoslav Stoyanov | (Poland) Michał Łogosz (Poland) Robert Mateusiak | 16–17, 15–13, 12–15 | (silver) Runner-up |
| 2000 | Dutch International | (Bulgaria) Svetoslav Stoyanov | (Poland) Michał Łogosz (Poland) Robert Mateusiak | 11–15, 15–9, 15–9 | (gold) Winner |
| 1999 | Le Volant d'Or de Toulouse | (Bulgaria) Svetoslav Stoyanov | (Germany) Kristof Hopp (Germany) Thomas Tesche | 15–5, 11–15, 15–10 | (gold) Winner |
| 1999 | Czech International | (Bulgaria) Svetoslav Stoyanov | (Germany) Christian Mohr (Germany) Joachim Tesche | 15–12, 15–10 | (gold) Winner |
| 1999 | Austrian International | (Bulgaria) Svetoslav Stoyanov | (Germany) Kristof Hopp (Germany) Thomas Tesche | 9–15, 15–6, 15–4 | (gold) Winner |
| 1998 | Irish International | (Bulgaria) Svetoslav Stoyanov | (England) Graham Hurrell (England) Peter Jeffrey | 15–11, 8–15, 15–6 | (gold) Winner |
| 1998 | Le Volant d'Or de Toulouse | (Bulgaria) Svetoslav Stoyanov | (France) Manuel Dubrulle (France) Vincent Laigle | 15–12, 6–15, 15–11 | (gold) Winner |
| 1998 | La Chaux-de-Fonds International | (Bulgaria) Svetoslav Stoyanov | (Austria) Harald Koch (Austria) Jürgen Koch | | (silver) Runner-up |
| 1997 | Le Volant d'Or de Toulouse | (Bulgaria) Svetoslav Stoyanov | (Ukraine) Valeriy Strelcov (Ukraine) Konstantin Tatranov | 15–4, 15–4 | (gold) Winner |
| 1997 | Hungarian International | (Bulgaria) Svetoslav Stoyanov | (Netherlands) Dennis Lens (Netherlands) Quinten van Dalm | 9–6, 9–5, 9–4 | (gold) Winner |
| 1997 | Bulgarian International | (Bulgaria) Svetoslav Stoyanov | (Bulgaria) Boris Kessov (Bulgaria) Ivan Sotirov | 9–3, 9–2, 9–0 | (gold) Winner |
| 1996 | Romanian International | (Bulgaria) Luben Panov | (Bulgaria) Plamen Peev (Bulgaria) Svetoslav Stoyanov | 15–14, 15–9 | (gold) Winner |
| 1994 | Bulgarian International | (Bulgaria) Svetoslav Stoyanov | (Poland) Robert Mateusiak (Poland) Damian Pławecki | 8–15, 8–15 | (silver) Runner-up |
| 1992 | Bulgarian International | (Bulgaria) Svetoslav Stoyanov | (Bulgaria) Boris Kessov (Commonwealth of Independent States) Anatoliy Skripko | 15–13, 16–18, 15–7 | (gold) Winner |
| 1992 | Romanian International | (Bulgaria) Svetoslav Stoyanov | | | (gold) Winner |

Mixed doubles
| Year | Tournament | Partner | Opponent | Score | Result |
|---|---|---|---|---|---|
| 1997 | Bulgarian International | (Bulgaria) Victoria Hristova | (Bulgaria) Svetoslav Stoyanov (Bulgaria) Raina Tzvetkova | 4–9, 5–9, 4–9 | (silver) Runner-up |
| 1996 | Romanian International | (Bulgaria) Victoria Hristova | (Bulgaria) Svetoslav Stoyanov (Bulgaria) Raina Tzvetkova | 2–15, 17–14, 10–15 | (silver) Runner-up |
