= Laura Choinet =

French badminton player (born 1984)

Personal information
- Born: 25 September 1984 (age 42)
- Weight: 63 kg (139 lb)

Sport
- Country: France
- Sport: Badminton

Women's & mixed doubles
- Highest ranking: 15 (WD 8 July 2010); 28 (XD 26 August 2010)
- BWF profile

Laura Choinet (born 25 September 1984) is a French badminton player affiliated with Racing Club de France. She won 7 titles at the French National Badminton Championships in women's doubles and mixed doubles between 2009 and 2014.

== Achievements ==
=== BWF International Challenge/Series ===
Women's doubles
Year	Tournament	Partner	Opponent	Score	Result
2003	Welsh International	(France) Perrine Le Buhanic	(Russia) Ella Karachkova (Russia) Anastasia Russkikh	1–15, 4–15	(silver) Runner-up
2009	Le Volant d'Or de Toulouse	(France) Weny Rahmawati	(Russia) Valeria Sorokina (Russia) Nina Vislova	12–21, 21–15, 9–21	(silver) Runner-up
2010	Turkey International	(France) Audrey Fontaine	(Russia) Anastasia Chervaykova (Russia) Maria Korobeyinkova	15–21, 11–21	(silver) Runner-up
2011	Swiss International	(France) Audrey Fontaine	(India) Pradnya Gadre (India) Prajakta Sawant	21–19, 10–21, 10–21	(silver) Runner-up
2015	Mercosul International	(France) Teshana Vignes Waran	(Turkey) Özge Bayrak (Turkey) Neslihan Yiğit	10–21, 11–21	(silver) Runner-up

Mixed doubles
Year	Tournament	Partner	Opponent	Score	Result
2008	Croatian International	(France) Baptiste Carême	(Bulgaria) Vladimir Metodiev (Bulgaria) Gabriela Banova	21–11, 21–15	(gold) Winner
2010	Turkey International	(France) Baptiste Carême	(Denmark) Mads Pieler Kolding (Denmark) Julie Houmann	12–21, 18–21	(silver) Runner-up
2013	Puerto Rico International	(France) Laurent Constantin	(Poland) Robert Mateusiak (Poland) Agnieszka Wojtkowska	13–21, 8–21	(silver) Runner-up
2014	Brazil International	(France) Laurent Constantin	(France) Gaëtan Mittelheisser (France) Audrey Fontaine	11–10, 5–11, 11–10, 11–7	(gold) Winner

BWF International Challenge tournament
BWF International Series tournament

== Personal life ==
Laura Choinet is married to a former badminton player from Scotland Imogen Bankier.
