= Graham Hurrell =

English badminton player

Personal information
- Born: 7 May 1975 (age 51)
- Height: 1.85 m (6 ft 1 in)

Sport
- Country: England
- Sport: Badminton
- Handedness: Right
- Retired: in 2003

Doubles
- Highest ranking: 9 (XD), 16 (MD)
- BWF profile

Graham Hurrell (born 7 May 1975) is an English retired badminton player. After retiring, he worked as coach at the Bournemouth David Lloyd Club. From 2007 to 2022, he was a National Pathway Coach of Badminton England and coached players at all major events including the Thomas Cup, Olympics and World Championships. In his playing years, he also competed in World Championships and won seven Caps.

== Achievements ==
=== IBF World Grand Prix ===
The World Badminton Grand Prix sanctioned by International Badminton Federation (IBF) since 1983.

Men's doubles
| Year | Tournament | Partner | Opponent | Score | Result |
|---|---|---|---|---|---|
| 2000 | U.S. Open | (England) James Anderson | (England) Anthony Clark (England) Ian Sullivan | 17–14, 15–11 | (gold) Winner |
| 1999 | U.S. Open | (England) James Anderson | (Denmark) Michael Lamp (Denmark) Jonas Rasmussen | 10–15, 13–15 | (silver) Runner-up |

=== IBF International ===
Men's doubles
| Year | Tournament | Partner | Opponent | Score | Result |
|---|---|---|---|---|---|
| 2002 | Spanish International | (England) Ian Sullivan | (France) Vincent Laigle (France) Svetoslav Stoyanov | 3–7, 7–2, 4–7, 7–8 | (silver) Runner-up |
| 1999 | Irish International | (England) James Anderson | (England) Anthony Clark (England) Paul Trueman | 15–5, 14–17, 15–4 | (gold) Winner |
| 1999 | Spanish International | (England) James Anderson | (France) Manuel Dubrulle (France) Vincent Laigle | 15–3, 15–10 | (gold) Winner |
| 1998 | Irish International | (England) Peter Jeffrey | (Bulgaria) Mihail Popov (Bulgaria) Svetoslav Stoyanov | 11–15, 15–8, 6–15 | (silver) Runner-up |
| 1998 | Slovak International | (England) Peter Jeffrey | (England) Anthony Clark (England) Ian Sullivan | 8–15, 15–12, 15–7 | (gold) Winner |
| 1998 | Czech International | (England) Peter Jeffrey | (France) Manuel Dubrulle (France) Vincent Laigle | 17–16, 15–7 | (gold) Winner |
| 1997 | Irish International | (England) Peter Jeffrey | (England) Ian Sullivan (England) James Anderson | 2–15, 15–10, 7–15 | (silver) Runner-up |
| 1997 | Mauritius International | (England) Peter Jeffrey | (Malaysia) Khoo Boo Hock (Malaysia) Theam Teow Lim | 15–10, 15–7 | (gold) Winner |

Mixed doubles
| Year | Tournament | Partner | Opponent | Score | Result |
|---|---|---|---|---|---|
| 2000 | Irish International | (England) Sara Hardaker | (Scotland) Russell Hogg (Scotland) Kirsteen McEwan | 9–15, 8–15 | (silver) Runner-up |
| 1997 | Mauritius International | (England) Wendy Taylor | (England) Peter Jeffrey (Scotland) Kirsteen McEwan | 6–15, 5–15 | (silver) Runner-up |
