= Manuel Dubrulle =

French badminton player (born 1972)

Personal information
- Born: 11 January 1972 (age 54)
- Height: 1.86 m (6 ft 1 in)

Sport
- Country: France
- Sport: Badminton
- Handedness: Right
- Event: Doubles

Doubles
- BWF profile

Manuel Dubrulle (born 11 January 1972) is a retired French badminton player.

== Career ==
Dubrulle was licensed at Racing Club de France and served as a member of the French team for fifteen years. He won 14 French national championships in men's and mixed doubles and around fifteen international titles. He made himself available to the national teams in 2005 at the end of his sports career as a national coach, a position he held for seven years. Within the world elite, Manuel Dubrulle was also known under the pseudonym "The wiper", a nickname given to him for his exceptional mobility in the background. He is currently coaching at the Trébes badminton club. His main partners for nearly ten years in senior competitions were Vincent Laigle (1994-1999), and Mihaïl Popov (2001-2003).

== Achievements ==
=== IBF International ===
Men's doubles
Year	Tournament	Partner	Opponent	Score	Result
1996	Slovenian International	(France) Vincent Laigle	(France) Bertrand Gallet (France) David Toupe	15–10, 15–12	(gold) Winner
1998	Czech International	(France) Vincent Laigle	(England) Graham Hurrell (England) Peter Jeffrey	16–17, 7–15	(silver) Runner-up
1998	Le Volant d'Or de Toulouse	(France) Vincent Laigle	(Bulgaria) Mihail Popov (Bulgaria) Svetoslav Stoyanov	12–15, 15–6, 11–15	(silver) Runner-up
1998	Spanish International	(France) Vincent Laigle	(England) David Lindley (England) Michael Scholes	15–9, 15–11	(gold) Winner
1999	Portugal International	(France) Vincent Laigle	(Spain) José Antonio Crespo (Spain) Sergio Llopis	15–3, 10–15, 15–9	(gold) Winner
1999	Waikato International	(France) Vincent Laigle	(Australia) David Bamford (Australia) Peter Blackburn	7–15, 7–15	(silver) Runner-up
1999	Romanian International	(France) Vincent Laigle	(Austria) Harald Koch (Austria) Jürgen Koch	10–15, 13–15	(silver) Runner-up
1999	Slovenian International	(France) Vincent Laigle	(Poland) Piotr Żołądek (Poland) Przemysław Wacha	14–17, 15–10, 15–13	(gold) Winner
1999	Iceland International	(France) Vincent Laigle	(Sweden) Fredrik Bergström (Sweden) Henrik Andersson	6–15, 13–15	(silver) Runner-up
1999	Spanish International	(France) Vincent Laigle	(England) Graham Hurrell (England) James Anderson	3–15, 10–15	(silver) Runner-up
2001	Czech International	(France) Mihail Popov	(France) Vincent Laigle (Bulgaria) Svetoslav Stoyanov	7–3, 7–3, 7–1	(gold) Winner
2001	Welsh International	(France) Mihail Popov	(France) Vincent Laigle (Bulgaria) Svetoslav Stoyanov	2–7, 7–5, 3–7, 7–4, 3–7	(silver) Runner-up
2001	Croatian International	(France) Mihail Popov	(France) Vincent Laigle (Bulgaria) Svetoslav Stoyanov	2–7, 4–7, 6–8	(silver) Runner-up
2001	La Chaux-de-Fonds International	(France) Mihail Popov	(France) Vincent Laigle (Bulgaria) Svetoslav Stoyanov	4–7, 2–7, 1–7	(silver) Runner-up
2001	BMW International	(France) Mihail Popov	(Denmark) Michael Lamp (Denmark) Michael Søgaard	3–7, 7–5, 4–7, 0–7	(silver) Runner-up
2002	Croatian International	(France) Mihail Popov	(France) Vincent Laigle (France) Svetoslav Stoyanov	2–7, 4–7, 6–8	(silver) Runner-up
2002	Finnish International	(France) Jean-Michel Lefort	(Russia) Andrej Zholobov (Russia) Evgenij Isakov	7–3, 7–8, 0–7, 7–5, 6–8	(silver) Runner-up
2002	Le Volant d'Or de Toulouse	(France) Mihail Popov	(France) Vincent Laigle (France) Svetoslav Stoyanov	4–15, 2–15	(silver) Runner-up
2003	Czech International	(France) Mihail Popov	(Denmark) Thomas Røjkjær Jensen (Denmark) Tommy Sørensen	15–10, 15–3	(gold) Winner
2003	Irish International	(France) Mihail Popov	(France) Vincent Laigle (France) Svetoslav Stoyanov	5–15, 8–15	(silver) Runner-up

Mixed doubles
Year	Tournament	Partner	Opponent	Score	Result
1996	Czech International	(France) Sandrine Lefèvre	(Denmark) Jonas Rasmussen (Denmark) Ann-Lou Jørgensen	2–15, 11–15	(silver) Runner-up
1996	Slovenian International	(France) Sandrine Lefèvre	(France) Vincent Laigle (France) Tatiana Vattier	13–15, 15–5, 15–2	(gold) Winner
1996	Le Volant d'Or de Toulouse	(France) Sandrine Lefèvre	(Bulgaria) Svetoslav Stoyanov (Bulgaria) Diana Koleva	10–15, 3–15	(silver) Runner-up
1996	Spanish International	(France) Sandrine Lefèvre	(Slovenia) Andrej Pohar (Slovenia) Maja Pohar	15–9, 15–12	(gold) Winner
2002	Czech International	(France) Elodie Eymard	(Belarus) Andrey Konakh (Belarus) Nadieżda Kostiuczyk	5–11, 11–13	(silver) Runner-up
