= Victoria Wright (badminton) =

Bulgarian-French badminton player

Personal information
- Born: Victoria Hristova; 1 May 1974 (age 52) Pazardzhik, Bulgaria
- Height: 1.68 m (5 ft 6 in)
- Weight: 56 kg (123 lb)

Sport
- Country: France
- Sport: Badminton
- Handedness: Right
- Event: Women's singles and doubles

Women's singles and doubles
- BWF profile

Victoria Wright (born Victoria Hristova; 1 May 1974) is a former Bulgarian badminton player, and later represented France. She competed for Bulgaria at the first edition of the badminton at the Summer Olympics in Barcelona. In Bulgaria, she won nine times National Championships title, 4 in the women's singles and 5 in the women's doubles event. She competed for France at the 2004 Summer Olympics in the mixed doubles event partnered with the former Bulgarian player Svetoslav Stoyanov. They lost to Jens Eriksen and Mette Schjoldager of Denmark in the round of 32. Wright won the French National Championships title, 2 times in the women's doubles event partnered with Tatiana Vattier, and 3 in the mixed doubles event with Stoyanov.

== Achievements ==
=== IBF International ===
Women's singles
Year	Tournament	Opponent	Score	Result
1992	Bulgarian International	(Bulgaria) Neli Nedjalkova	11–4, 5–11, 1–0 retired	(gold) Winner
1996	Romanian International	(Bulgaria) Raina Tzvetkova	11–4, 11–1	(gold) Winner
1997	Bulgarian International	(Scotland) Anne Gibson	1–9, 5–9, 3–9	(silver) Runner-up

Women's doubles
Year	Tournament	Partner	Opponent	Score	Result
1992	Bulgarian International	(Bulgaria) Dimitrinka Dimitrova	(Bulgaria) Neli Nedjalkova (Bulgaria) Reni Asenova	Walkover	(gold) Winner
1996	Romanian International	(Bulgaria) Raina Tzvetkova	(Romania) Cristina Savulescu (Romania) Daniela Timofte	15–3, 15–4	(gold) Winner
1997	Bulgarian International	(Bulgaria) Raina Tzvetkova	(Bulgaria) Dimitrinka Dimitrova (Bulgaria) Dobrinka Smilianova		(gold) Winner

Mixed doubles
Year	Tournament	Partner	Opponent	Score	Result
1996	Romanian International	(Bulgaria) Mihail Popov	(Bulgaria) Svetoslav Stoyanov (Bulgaria) Raina Tzvetkova	2–15, 17–14, 10–15	(silver) Runner-up
1997	Bulgarian International	(Bulgaria) Mihail Popov	(Bulgaria) Svetoslav Stoyanov (Bulgaria) Raina Tzvetkova	4–9, 5–9, 4–9	(silver) Runner-up
2003	Slovak International	(France) Svetoslav Stoyanov	(Russia) Alexandr Russkikh (Russia) Anastasia Russkikh	7–15, 9–15	(silver) Runner-up
2004	Dutch International	(France) Svetoslav Stoyanov	(Denmark) Tommy Sørensen (Denmark) Britta Andersen	8–15, 15–8, 15–8	(gold) Winner
2004	Croatian International	(France) Svetoslav Stoyanov	(Denmark) Rasmus Mangor Andersen (Denmark) Helle Nielsen	15–12, 15–7	(gold) Winner
