= Pellizza =

Pellizza is an Italian-language surname. Notable people with the surname include:

- Giuseppe Pellizza da Volpedo (1868–1907), Italian Divisionist painter
- Henri Pellizza, (1920–2001), French badminton and tennis player
- Pierre Pellizza, (1917–1974), French tennis player
