= French Badminton Federation =

France's governing body for badminton

French Badminton Federation Fédération Française de Badminton
- Formation: February 1979
- Type: National Sport Association
- Headquarters: Saint-Ouen, Seine-Saint-Denis
- President: Florent Chayet
- Affiliations: BEC, BWF
- Website: ffbad.org

French Badminton Federation (FFBaD, French: Fédération Française de Badminton) is the national governing body for the sport of badminton in France. As of 2017, it has more than 191,600 registered players across the country and 1,977 affiliated badminton clubs.

== History ==
The original federation was founded in 1930, but it was dissolved in 1941 and merged as part of French Tennis Federation during the Vichy regime. It was not until 1979 when a group of badminton enthusiasts decided to create a new federation which later became the current form of the organization.

== Tournaments ==
- French Open, an annual open tournament that attracts the world's elite players.
- Orleans Masters (formerly Orléans International), an annual tournament held in Orléans first started in 2012.
- Le Volant d'Or de Toulouse, an annual tournament held in Toulouse which was discontinued after 2009.
