= Bertrand Gallet =

French badminton player (born 1974)

Personal information
- Born: 24 May 1974 (age 52) Lille, France
- Height: 1.78 m (5 ft 10 in)
- Weight: 68 kg (150 lb)

Sport
- Country: France
- Sport: Badminton
- Event: Men's singles & doubles

Men's singles & doubles
- BWF profile

Bertrand Gallet (born 24 May 1974) is a former French badminton player. Born in Lille, Gallet started the sport from an early age. He practiced football at the age of six, then began playing tennis and handball in Béthune. He chose to play badminton when he was 14. He went to INSEP in 17 and graduated in 2000.

Played for the Racing Club de France in the national event, Gallet won his first national title in 1996, and throughout his career, he had collected seven National Championships title, 4 in the men's singles and 3 in the men's doubles event partnered with Jean-Michel Lefort. He represented his country at the 2000 Summer Olympics in the men's singles event, reaching into the second round. His best ranked was world No. 41 in the singles event. In 2001, he join the Créteil club, where he had previously been a junior coach there. Gallet was part of the Créteil coach for fifteen years, then he became the French national team coach. He married Anne-Marie Christensen, a former Danish badminton player, in 2003. He retired from the international tournament in March 2005.

== Achievements ==
=== IBF International ===
Men's singles
Year	Tournament	Opponent	Score	Result
2001	Norwegian International	(Wales) Irwansyah	8–6, 2–7, 7–3, 1–7, 3–7	(silver) Runner-up
1999	Iceland International	(Sweden) Rasmus Wengberg	15–10, 6–15, 4–15	(silver) Runner-up
1999	Kenya International	(Israel) Nir Yusim	15–11, 15–9	(gold) Winner

Men's doubles
Year	Tournament	Partner	Opponent	Score	Result
2004	Irish International	(France) Mihail Popov	(England) Ruben Gordown Khosadalina (England) Aji Basuki Sindoro	10–15, 6–15	(silver) Runner-up
2001	Norwegian International	(France) Jean-Michel Lefort	(Denmark) Martin Delfs (Denmark) Jonas Glyager Jensen	4–7, 2–7, 6–8	(silver) Runner-up
1999	Kenya International	(Kenya) Robert Mbugua	(Zambia) Mubanga Kaite (Zambia) Stanley Pitiri Mwangulu	15–4, 2–15, 15–7	(gold) Winner
1996	Slovenian International	(France) David Toupé	(France) Manuel Dubrulle (France) Vincent Laigle	10–15, 12–15	(silver) Runner-up
