= 2008 European Badminton Championships =

Tournament details
- Dates: 16-20 April 2008
- Venue: Messecenter
- Location: Herning, Denmark

Champions
- Men's singles: (Denmark) Kenneth Jonassen
- Women's singles: (Germany) Xu Huaiwen
- Men's doubles: (Denmark) Lars Paaske (Denmark) Jonas Rasmussen
- Women's doubles: (Denmark) Kamilla Rytter Juhl (Denmark) Lena Frier Kristiansen
- Mixed doubles: (England) Anthony Clark (England) Donna Kellogg

The 2008 European Badminton Championships were the 21st tournament of the European Badminton Championships. They were held in Messecenter, Herning, Denmark, from April 16 to April 20, 2008, and they were organised by the Badminton Europe and the Danmarks Badminton Forbund.

The competition was preceded by the 2008 European Mixed Team Badminton Championships, held between April 12 and April 15.

== Medalists ==
Event	Gold	Silver	Bronze
Men's singles	(Denmark) Kenneth Jonassen	(Denmark) Joachim Persson	(Poland) Przemysław Wacha
Men's singles	(Denmark) Kenneth Jonassen	(Denmark) Joachim Persson	(Denmark) Jan Ø. Jørgensen
Women's singles	(Germany) Xu Huaiwen	(Denmark) Tine Rasmussen	(France) Pi Hongyan
Women's singles	(Germany) Xu Huaiwen	(Denmark) Tine Rasmussen	(Germany) Juliane Schenk
Men's doubles	(Denmark) Lars Paaske and Jonas Rasmussen	(Denmark) Jens Eriksen and Martin Lundgaard Hansen	(France) Erwin Kehlhoffner and Svetoslav Stoyanov
Men's doubles	(Denmark) Lars Paaske and Jonas Rasmussen	(Denmark) Jens Eriksen and Martin Lundgaard Hansen	(Germany) Kristof Hopp and Ingo Kindervater
Women's doubles	(Denmark) Kamilla Rytter Juhl and Lena Frier Kristiansen	(England) Donna Kellogg and Gail Emms	(Sweden) Elin Bergblom and Johanna Persson
Women's doubles	(Denmark) Kamilla Rytter Juhl and Lena Frier Kristiansen	(England) Donna Kellogg and Gail Emms	(Russia) Valeria Sorokina and Nina Vislova
Mixed doubles	(England) Anthony Clark and Donna Kellogg	(Poland) Robert Mateusiak and Nadieżda Kostiuczyk	(England) Nathan Robertson and Gail Emms
Mixed doubles	(England) Anthony Clark and Donna Kellogg	(Poland) Robert Mateusiak and Nadieżda Kostiuczyk	(Denmark) Carsten Mogensen and Helle Nielsen

== Results ==
=== Men's singles ===
Quarterfinals
1	(Denmark) Kenneth Jonassen	21	21
9/16	(Republic of Ireland) Scott Evans	9	14
(Germany) Dieter Domke	17	18
(Denmark) Jan Ø. Jørgensen	21	21
5/8	(Netherlands) Eric Pang	21	18	11
3/4	(Denmark) Joachim Persson	11	21	21
9/16	(Spain) Pablo Abián	11	17
2	(Poland) Przemysław Wacha	21	21

Semifinals
(Denmark) Kenneth Jonassen	21	21
(Denmark) Jan Ø. Jørgensen	12	9
(Denmark) Joachim Persson	17	21	21
(Poland) Przemysław Wacha	21	9	10

Finals
(Denmark) Kenneth Jonassen	21	21
(Denmark) Joachim Persson	13	16

=== Women's singles ===
Quarterfinals
1	(France) Pi Hongyan	21	21
5/8	(Netherlands) Judith Meulendijks	9	17
3/4	(Germany) Xu Huaiwen	22	21
5/8	(Bulgaria) Petya Nedelcheva	20	19
5/8	(England) Tracey Hallam	D	N	S
3/4	(Germany) Juliane Schenk
5/8	(Netherlands) Yao Jie	18	16
2	(Denmark) Tine Rasmussen	21	21

Semifinals
(France) Pi Hongyan	11	21	18
(Germany) Xu Huaiwen	21	4	21
(Germany) Juliane Schenk	6	21	13
(Denmark) Tine Rasmussen	21	16	21

Finals
(Germany) Xu Huaiwen	12	21	21
(Denmark) Tine Rasmussen	21	12	17

=== Men's doubles ===
Quarterfinals
1	(Denmark) Paaske/Rasmussen	21	21
(England) Adcock/George	17	10
(France) Kehlhoffner/Stoyanov	21	16	21
5/8	(Germany) Fuchs/Spitko	15	21	15
5/8	(England) Adcock/Middleton	21	21
3/4	(Germany) Hopp/Kindervater	17	11
5/8	(Belgium) Claes/Mawet	11	10
2	(Denmark) Eriksen/Lundgaard	21	21

Semifinals
(Denmark) Paaske/Rasmussen	22	21
(France) Kehlhoffner/Stoyanov	20	13
(Germany) Hopp/Kindervater	23	16	8
(Denmark) Eriksen/Lundgaard	21	21	21

Finals
(Denmark) Paaske/Rasmussen	21	21
(Denmark) Eriksen/Lundgaard	19	16

=== Women's doubles ===
Quarterfinals
1	(England) Emms/Kellogg	21	21
(Scotland) Bankier/Yuan Gao	9	13
3/4	(Russia) Ananina/Russkikh	21	17	18
5/8	(Sweden) Bergblom/Persson	18	21	21
5/8	(Russia) Sorokina/Vislova	21	21
3/4	(England) Munt/Nicholas	15	12
5/8	(Poland) Augustyn/Kostiuczyk	21	13
2	(Denmark) Juhl/Kristiansen	23	21

Semifinals
(England) Emms/Kellogg	21	21
(Sweden) Bergblom/Persson	18	7
(Russia) Sorokina/Vislova	19	20
(Denmark) Juhl/Kristiansen	21	22

Finals
(England) Emms/Kellogg	18	18
(Denmark) Juhl/Kristiansen	21	21

=== Mixed doubles ===
Quarterfinals
1	(England) Robertson/Emms	21	21
(Scotland) Briggs/Cooper	5	9
3/4	(Poland) Mateusiak/Kostiuczyk	21	21
5/8	(Germany) Kindervater/Piotrowski	19	15
(Denmark) Mogensen/Nielsen	19	21
3/4	(Denmark) Laybourn/Juhl	21	13	r.
5/8	(England) Blair/ (Scotland) Bankier	21	14	14
2	(England) Clark/Kellogg	13	21	21

Semifinals
(England) Robertson/Emms	21	10	6
(Poland) Mateusiak/Kostiuczyk	14	21	21
(Denmark) Mogensen*/Nielsen	18	19
(England) Clark/Kellogg	21	21

Finals
(Poland) Mateusiak/Kostiuczyk	21	20	15
(England) Clark/Kellogg	16	22	21

* Carsten Mogensen was given a red card after the game for kicking his racquet into the crowd.

== Medal count ==
Pos	Country	Gold	Silver	Bronze	Total
1	Denmark	3	3	2	8
2	England	1	1	1	3
3	Germany	1	0	2	3
4	Poland	0	1	1	2
5	France	0	0	2	2
6	Sweden	0	0	1	1
6	Russia	0	0	1	1
