= Michael Lamp =

Danish badminton player

Personal information
- Born: 19 November 1977 (age 48)
- Height: 1.93 m (6 ft 4 in)

Sport
- Country: Denmark
- Sport: Badminton
- Handedness: Right
- Coached by: Steen Pedersen

Doubles
- Highest ranking: 10 (MD with Jonas Rasmussen); 6 (XD with Ann-Lou Jørgensen)
- BWF profile
Medal record
Men's badminton
Representing Denmark
Sudirman Cup
| Bronze medal – third place | 2003 Eindhoven | Mixed team |

Michael Lamp (born 10 November 1977) is a Danish retired badminton player. He was once the top ten in both men's doubles and mixed doubles rankings. Michael Lamp won the Slovak International in 1997 and the Scottish Open the following year. In 1999 he won the US Open and again the Scottish Open. In 2001 he won the Bitburger Open and in 2003 the Spanish International. He also medalled in World mixed team championships in 2003.

== Achievements ==
=== IBF World Grand Prix ===
The World Badminton Grand Prix was sanctioned by the International Badminton Federation from 1983 to 2006.

Men's doubles
| Year | Tournament | Partner | Opponent | Score | Result |
|---|---|---|---|---|---|
| 1999 | U.S. Open | (Denmark) Jonas Rasmussen | (England) Graham Hurrell (England) James Anderson | 15–10, 15–13 | (gold) Winner |
| 2000 | Swedish Open | (Denmark) Jonas Rasmussen | (Thailand) Khunakorn Sudhisodhi (Thailand) Kitipon Kitikul | 8–15, 11–15 | (silver) Runner-up |
| 2000 | German Open | (Denmark) Jonas Rasmussen | (Denmark) Jim Laugesen (Denmark) Michael Søgaard | 17–16, 10–15, 7–15 | (silver) Runner-up |
| 2001 | German Open | (Denmark) Jonas Rasmussen | (Denmark) Jim Laugesen (Denmark) Michael Søgaard | 1–7, 1–7, 7–3, 4–7 | (silver) Runner-up |

Mixed doubles
| Year | Tournament | Partner | Opponent | Score | Result |
|---|---|---|---|---|---|
| 1999 | U.S. Open | (Denmark) Pernille Harder | (Denmark) Jonas Rasmussen (Denmark) Jane F. Bramsen | 3–15, 10–15 | (silver) Runner-up |
| 2001 | German Open | (Denmark) Ann-Lou Jørgensen | (Denmark) Michael Søgaard (Denmark) Rikke Olsen | 1–7, 4–7, 1–7 | (silver) Runner-up |

=== IBF International ===
Men's doubles
| Year | Tournament | Partner | Opponent | Score | Result |
|---|---|---|---|---|---|
| 1998 | Norwegian International | (Denmark) Martin Lundgaard Hansen | (Denmark) Jesper Mikla (Denmark) Lars Paaske | 9–15, 5–15 | (silver) Runner-up |
| 1998 | Scottish International | (Denmark) Martin Lundgaard Hansen | (England) Anthony Clark (England) Ian Sullivan | 15–10, 15–5 | (gold) Winner |
| 1999 | Scottish International | (Denmark) Jonas Rasmussen | (Scotland) Russell Hogg (Scotland) Kenny Middlemiss | 15–8, 15–11 | (gold) Winner |
| 2001 | BMW International | (Denmark) Michael Søgaard | (France) Manuel Dubrulle (France) Mihail Popov | 7–3, 5–7, 7–4, 7–0 | (gold) Winner |
| 2003 | Spanish International | (Denmark) Mathias Boe | (Russia) Stanislav Pukhov (Russia) Nikolai Zuyev | 15–4, 15–9 | (gold) Winner |
| 2003 | Portugal International | (Denmark) Mathias Boe | (Denmark) Jim Laugesen (Denmark) Michael Søgaard | 7–15, 3–15 | (silver) Runner-up |

Mixed doubles
| Year | Tournament | Partner | Opponent | Score | Result |
|---|---|---|---|---|---|
| 1997 | Slovak International | (Denmark) Rikke Broen | (Slovenia) Andrej Pohar (Slovenia) Maja Pohar | 15–6, 15–2 | (gold) Winner |
| 1998 | Scottish International | (Denmark) Mette Schjoldager | (England) Ian Sullivan (England) Gail Emms | 15–10, 11–15, 15–12 | (gold) Winner |
