= Tatiana Vattier =

French badminton player

Tatiana Verge
Personal information
- Born: Tatiana Vattier; 24 January 1977 (age 49) Sainte-Adresse, Seine-Maritime, France
- Height: 1.70 m (5 ft 7 in)
- Weight: 58 kg (128 lb)

Sport
- Country: France
- Sport: Badminton
- Handedness: Right
- Event: Women's singles & doubles

Women's singles & doubles
- BWF profile

Tatiana Verge (born 24 January 1977; née Vattier) is a French badminton player, also play for the Issy-les-Moulineaux and Racing Club de France, Paris. She competed at the 2000 Summer Olympics in Sydney, Australia. Vattier had won 10 times National Championships, 4 in the women's singles, 4 in the women's doubles, and 2 in the mixed doubles event.

== Achievements ==
=== IBF International ===
Women's singles
Year	Tournament	Opponent	Score	Result
1997	Strasbourg International	(Indonesia) Hariati	6–11, 5–11	(silver) Runner-up
2001	Norwegian International	(Finland) Anu Weckström	0–7, 1–7, 4–7	(silver) Runner-up

Women's doubles
Year	Tournament	Partner	Opponent	Score	Result
1996	Le Volant d'Or de Toulouse	(France) Sandrine Lefèvre	(Bulgaria) Neli Boteva (Bulgaria) Diana Koleva	5–15, 4–15	(silver) Runner-up
1997	Strasbourg International	(France) Sandrine Lefèvre	(Denmark) Rikke Broen (Denmark) Helle Stærmose	3–15, 7–15	(silver) Runner-up
1997	Le Volant d'Or de Toulouse	(France) Armelle Cassen	(Ukraine) Elena Nozdran (Ukraine) Viktoria Evtuschenko	3–15, 7–15	(silver) Runner-up

Mixed doubles
Year	Tournament	Partner	Opponent	Score	Result
1996	Slovenian International	(France) Vincent Laigle	(France) Manuel Dubrulle (France) Sandrine Lefèvre	15–13, 5–15, 2–15	(silver) Runner-up
