= Jean-Claude Bertrand =

French badminton player (born 1954)

Personal information
- Born: 5 August 1954 (age 71)

Sport
- Country: France
- Sport: Badminton

Jean-Claude Bertrand (born 5 August 1954) is a retired badminton player from France.

He won 12 French National Championships, 8 in mixed doubles, 2 in men's doubles and 2 in men's singles.
