= Czech International =

Badminton tournament in the Czech Republic

The Czech Open in badminton is an international open held in the Czech Republic since 1993. This tournament followed the Czechoslovakian Open and is often used by European, in particular Danish, new generation talents as jump board into the European point. In 2018, the Český Badmintonový Svaz held two level 4 tournaments, the International Series in Karviná, and the International Challenge in Brno, which held in March and September, respectively.

== Previous winners ==
=== Czech Open ===
Year	Men's singles	Women's singles	Men's doubles	Women's doubles	Mixed doubles	Ref
1993	(Denmark) Jim Laugesen	(Denmark) Mette Sørensen	(England) Neil Cottrill (England) John Quinn	(Russia) Nadezhda Chervyakova (Russia) Marina Yakusheva	(England) John Quinn (England) Nicola Beck	
1994	(Denmark) Henrik Sørensen	(Austria) Irina Serova	(Denmark) Claus Simonsen (Denmark) Henrik Sørensen	(Denmark) Lone Sørensen (Denmark) Mette Sørensen	(Austria) Jürgen Koch (Austria) Irina Serova	
1995	(Denmark) Thomas Søgaard	(Russia) Elena Rybkina	(Denmark) Thomas Stavngaard (Denmark) Janek Roos	(Denmark) Michelle Rasmussen (Denmark) Mette Sørensen	(Denmark) Janek Roos (Denmark) Pernille Harder	
1996	(Sweden) Daniel Eriksson	(Denmark) Tanja Berg	(Sweden) Henrik Andersson (Sweden) Johan Tholinsson	(Denmark) Ann-Lou Jørgensen (Denmark) Christina Sørensen	(Denmark) Jonas Rasmussen (Denmark) Ann-Lou Jørgensen	
1997	(Sweden) Martin Hagberg	(Scotland) Anne Gibson	(England) James Anderson (England) Ian Sullivan	(England) Gail Emms (England) Rebecca Pantaney	(England) Ian Sullivan (England) Gail Emms	
1998	(England) Robert Nock	(Russia) Ella Karachkova	(England) Graham Hurrell (England) Peter Jeffrey	(England) Lorraine Cole (England) Tracy Dineen	(England) Anthony Clark (England) Lorraine Cole	
1999	(England) Robert Nock	(Germany) Katja Michalowsky	(Bulgaria) Mihail Popov (Bulgaria) Svetoslav Stoyanov	(England) Liza Parker (England) Suzanne Rayappan	(Sweden) Ola Molin (Sweden) Johanna Persson	
2000	(Netherlands) Gerben Bruijstens	(Denmark) Christina Sørensen	(Denmark) Thomas Hovgaard (Denmark) Jesper Mikla	(Denmark) Britta Andersen (Denmark) Lene Mørk	(Denmark) Mathias Boe (Denmark) Britta Andersen	
2001	(Canada) Bobby Milroy	(England) Rebecca Pantaney	(France) Manuel Dubrulle (France) Mihail Popov	(Poland) Kamila Augustyn (Belarus) Nadieżda Kostiuczyk	(England) Kristian Roebuck (England) Natalie Munt	
2002	(Poland) Przemysław Wacha	(Sweden) Sara Persson	(France) Vincent Laigle (France) Svetoslav Stoyanov	(Sweden) Elin Bergblom (Sweden) Johanna Persson	(Belarus) Andrey Konakh (Belarus) Nadieżda Kostiuczyk	
2003	(Denmark) Michael Christensen	(Bulgaria) Petya Nedelcheva	(France) Manuel Dubrulle (France) Mihail Popov	(Bulgaria) Neli Boteva (Bulgaria) Petya Nedelcheva	(Canada) Mike Beres (Canada) Jody Patrick	
2004	(Sweden) Per-Henrik Croona	(Germany) Katja Michalowsky	(Canada) Mike Beres (Canada) William Milroy	(Denmark) Britta Andersen (Denmark) Mie Schjøtt-Kristensen	(Denmark) Jesper Thomsen (Denmark) Britta Andersen	
2005	(Poland) Przemysław Wacha	(Scotland) Susan Hughes	(England) Chris Langridge (England) Chris Tonks	(Poland) Kamila Augustyn (Poland) Nadieżda Kostiuczyk	(Sweden) Henri Hurskainen (Sweden) Johanna Persson	
2006	(Denmark) Jan Ø. Jørgensen	(Iceland) Ragna Ingólfsdóttir	(England) Robert Adcock (England) Robin Middleton	(Denmark) Christinna Pedersen (Denmark) Mie Schjøtt-Kristensen	(England) Liza Parker (England) Robin Middleton	
2007	(India) Arvind Bhat	(Netherlands) Rachel van Cutsen	(Denmark) Rasmus Bonde (Denmark) Kasper Henriksen	(Denmark) Christinna Pedersen (Denmark) Mie Schjøtt-Kristensen	(Denmark) Rasmus Bonde (Denmark) Christinna Pedersen	
2008	(India) Chetan Anand	(Russia) Ella Diehl	(Denmark) Kasper Henriksen (Denmark) Christian Skovgaard	(Denmark) Helle Nielsen (Denmark) Marie Røpke	(Denmark) Rasmus Bonde (Denmark) Helle Nielsen	
2009	(Czech Republic) Petr Koukal	(India) Trupti Murgunde	(Denmark) Mads Conrad-Petersen (Denmark) Mads Pieler Kolding	(Denmark) Maria Helsbøl (Denmark) Anne Skelbæk	(Indonesia) Viki Indra Okvana (Indonesia) Gustiani Megawati	
2010	(India) Ajay Jayaram	(Denmark) Karina Jørgensen	(England) Chris Langridge (England) Robin Middleton	(Netherlands) Selena Piek (Netherlands) Iris Tabeling	(Denmark) Anders Skaarup Rasmussen (Denmark) Anne Skelbæk	
2011	(Poland) Przemysław Wacha	(Czech Republic) Kristína Gavnholt	(Poland) Adam Cwalina (Poland) Michał Łogosz	(Russia) Valeria Sorokina (Russia) Nina Vislova	(Russia) Aleksandr Nikolaenko (Russia) Nina Vislova	
2012	(Denmark) Joachim Persson	(Scotland) Kirsty Gilmour	(England) Chris Langridge (England) Peter Mills	(England) Heather Olver (England) Kate Robertshaw	(England) Chris Langridge (England) Heather Olver	
2013	(India) Anup Sridhar	(Scotland) Kirsty Gilmour	(Poland) Adam Cwalina (Poland) Przemysław Wacha	(Scotland) Imogen Bankier (Bulgaria) Petya Nedelcheva	(Chinese Taipei) Wang Chi-lin (Chinese Taipei) Wu Ti-jung	
2014	(Germany) Marc Zwiebler	(Canada) Michelle Li	(Poland) Adam Cwalina (Poland) Przemysław Wacha	(Canada) Rachel Honderich (Canada) Michelle Li	(Sweden) Jonathan Nordh (Sweden) Emelie Fabbeke	
2015	(Germany) Marc Zwiebler	(Scotland) Kirsty Gilmour	(Poland) Adam Cwalina (Poland) Przemysław Wacha	(Germany) Isabel Herttrich (Germany) Birgit Michels	(Russia) Vitalij Durkin (Russia) Nina Vislova	
2016	(Spain) Pablo Abián	(Denmark) Natalia Koch Rohde	(Chinese Taipei) Lu Ching-yao (Chinese Taipei) Yang Po-han	(England) Lauren Smith (England) Sarah Walker	(Denmark) Mathias Bay-Smidt (Denmark) Alexandra Bøje	
2017	(Japan) Kento Momota	(Turkey) Neslihan Yiğit	(Poland) Miłosz Bochat (Poland) Adam Cwalina	(Japan) Erina Honda (Japan) Nozomi Shimizu	(Denmark) Mathias Bay-Smidt (Denmark) Alexandra Bøje	
2018	(France) Toma Junior Popov	(Germany) Yvonne Li	(France) Thom Gicquel (France) Ronan Labar	(England) Chloe Birch (England) Lauren Smith	(France) Ronan Labar (France) Audrey Fontaine	
2019	(Republic of Ireland) Jonathan Dolan	(England) Abigail Holden	(Republic of Ireland) Joshua Magee (Republic of Ireland) Paul Reynolds	(Germany) Lisa Kaminski (Germany) Hannah Pohl	(Czech Republic) Jakub Bitman (Czech Republic) Alžběta Bášová	
2020	Cancelled (Note: This tournament, originally to be played from 13 to 18 October, was later cancelled due to the COVID-19 pandemic in the Czech Republic.)					
2021	(Czech Republic) Jan Louda	(Indonesia) Putri Kusuma Wardani	(Singapore) Terry Hee (Singapore) Loh Kean Hean	(Malaysia) Anna Cheong (Malaysia) Teoh Mei Xing	(Singapore) Terry Hee (Singapore) Tan Wei Han	
2022	(Denmark) Victor Svendsen	(Denmark) Amalie Schulz	(Thailand) Pharanyu Kaosamaang (Thailand) Worrapol Thongsa-nga	(Denmark) Christine Busch (Denmark) Amalie Schulz	(Denmark) Mads Vestergaard (Denmark) Christine Busch	
2023	(Czech Republic) Jan Louda	(Denmark) Frederikke Østergaard	(United States) Chen Zhi-yi (United States) Presley Smith	(France) Tea Margueritte (France) Flavie Vallet	(Sweden) Ludwig Axelsson (Sweden) Jessica Silvennoinen	
2024	(Germany) Matthias Kicklitz	(Denmark) Frederikke Lund	(Czech Republic) Jiří Král (Czech Republic) Ondřej Král	(Poland) Paulina Hankiewicz (Poland) Kornelia Marczak	(Denmark) Kristoffer Kolding (Denmark) Mette Werge	
2025	(Indonesia) Muhamad Yusuf	(Bulgaria) Kaloyana Nalbantova	(Denmark) Rasmus Espersen (Denmark) Andreas Søndergaard	(Denmark) Natasja Anthonisen (Denmark) Amalie Cecilie Kudsk	(Denmark) Rasmus Espersen (Denmark) Amalie Cecilie Kudsk	
2026	(Finland) Joakim Oldorff	(Chinese Taipei) Sung Shuo-yun	(England) Alex Green (England) Zach Russ	(Germany) Stine Küspert (Germany) Isabel Lohau	(Denmark) Jesper Toft (Denmark) Amalie Cecilie Kudsk	

=== KaBaL International Karviná ===
Year	Men's singles	Women's singles	Men's doubles	Women's doubles	Mixed doubles	Ref
2017	(Czech Republic) Milan Ludík	(Chinese Taipei) Lin Sih-yun	(Poland) Łukasz Moreń (Poland) Wojciech Szkudlarczyk	(Ukraine) Maryna Ilyinskaya (Ukraine) Yelyzaveta Zharka	(Czech Republic) Jakub Bitman (Czech Republic) Alžběta Bášová	
2018	(Denmark) Victor Svendsen	(Japan) Yuri Nakamura	(Germany) Bjarne Geiss (Germany) Jan Colin Völker	(Thailand) Supissara Paewsampran (Thailand) Puttita Supajirakul	(Germany) Peter Käsbauer (Germany) Olga Konon	
2020	Cancelled (Note: This tournament, originally to be played from 12 to 15 March, was later cancelled due to the COVID-19 pandemic in the Czech Republic.)					

=== Czech International Future Series ===
Year	Men's singles	Women's singles	Men's doubles	Women's doubles	Mixed doubles	Ref
2025	(Austria) Collins Valentine Filimon	(Chinese Taipei) Wang Yu-si	(Germany) Jonathan Dresp (Germany) Simon Krax	(Turkey) Yasemen Bektaş (Turkey) Sinem Yıldız	(Germany) Simon Krax (Germany) Amelie Lehmann	
2026	(Germany) Luis Pongratz	(Vietnam) Vũ Thị Trang	(United Arab Emirates) Dev Ayyappan (United Arab Emirates) Dhiren Ayyappan	(Germany) Stine Küspert (Germany) Isabel Lohau	(United Arab Emirates) Dhiren Ayyappan (United Arab Emirates) Taabia Khan	

== Performances by nation ==
=== Czech Open ===
As of the 2026 edition

No	Nation	MS	WS	MD	WD	XD	Total
1	Denmark	7	8	7	11	13	46
2	England	2	2	8	6	6	24
3	Poland	3		5	2.5		10.5
4	Sweden	3	1	1	1	4	10
5	Germany	3	3		3		9
6	France	1		4	1	1	7
6	Russia		3		2	2	7
8	Czech Republic*	3	1	1		1	6
9	Scotland		5		0.5		5.5
10	Canada	1	1	1	1	1	5
10	India	4	1				5
12	Bulgaria		2	1	1.5		4.5
13	Chinese Taipei		1	1		1	3
13	Netherlands	1	1		1		3
13	Indonesia	1	1			1	3
16	Austria		1			1	2
16	Ireland	1		1			2
16	Japan	1			1		2
16	Singapore			1		1	2
20	Belarus				0.5	1	1.5
21	Finland	1					1
21	Iceland		1				1
21	Malaysia				1		1
21	Spain	1					1
21	Thailand			1			1
21	Turkey		1				1
21	United States			1			1
Total		33	33	33	33	33	165

=== KaBaL International Karviná ===
No	Nation	MS	WS	MD	WD	XD	Total
1	Czech Republic*	1				1	2
1	Germany			1		1	2
2	Chinese Taipei		1				1
2	Denmark	1					1
2	Japan		1				1
2	Poland			1			1
2	Thailand				1		1
2	Ukraine				1		1
Total		2	2	2	2	2	10

=== Czech International Future Series ===
As of the 2026 edition

No	Nation	MS	WS	MD	WD	XD	Total
1	Germany	1		1	1	1	4
2	United Arab Emirates			1		1	2
3	Austria	1					1
3	Chinese Taipei		1				1
3	Turkey				1		1
3	Vietnam		1				1
Total		2	2	2	2	2	10

* Host nation
