= Erwin Kehlhoffner =

French badminton player (born 1983)

Personal information
- Born: 6 December 1983 (age 42) Strasbourg, Bas-Rhin, France
- Height: 1.80 m (5 ft 11 in)
- Weight: 72 kg (159 lb)

Sport
- Country: France
- Sport: Badminton
- Handedness: Right
- Event: Men's singles & doubles

Men's singles & doubles
- BWF profile
Medal record
Men's badminton
Representing France
European Championships
Bronze medal – third place	2008 Herning	Men's doubles

Erwin Kehlhoffner (born 6 December 1983 in Strasbourg) is a badminton player from France affiliated with ASL Robertsau club.

== Career ==
In the junior event, he won the national singles title in 2002, and also the doubles titles in 2001 and 2002. Kehlhoffner competed at the 2005 World Championships in the men's singles and doubles event, but was defeated in the first round both in singles and doubles event. He also qualified to play at the 2006 World Championships in the men's doubles event with his partner Thomas Quéré, but the duo defeated by the German players in the first round. In 2007 he competed in the men's singles event, and was defeated in the first round by Richard Vaughan of Wales, 21–9, 22–20. He won the bronze medal at the 2008 European Championships in the men's doubles with Svetoslav Stoyanov. At the same year, he was qualified to participate in the men's singles event at the Olympic Games in Beijing, China. He reach in to the third round after beating Stuart Gomez of Australia and Eli Mambwe of Zambia in the first and second rounds, but was defeated by Chen Jin of China in the third round.

== Achievements ==
=== European Championships ===
Men's doubles
Year	Venue	Partner	Opponent	Score	Result
2008	Messecenter; Herning, Denmark	(France) Svetoslav Stoyanov	(Denmark) Lars Paaske (Denmark) Jonas Rasmussen	20–22, 13–21	Bronze

=== BWF International Challenge/Series ===
Men's singles
Year	Tournament	Opponent	Score	Result
2008	Croatian International	(Finland) Ville Lång	17–21, 6–21	(silver) Runner-up
2007	North Shore City International	(New Zealand) John Moody	21–16, 21–18	(gold) Winner

Men's doubles
Year	Tournament	Partner	Opponent	Score	Result
2007	Bulgarian International	(France) Svetoslav Stoyanov	(Poland) Robert Mateusiak (Poland) Michal Logosz	Walkover	(silver) Runner-up
2005	Croatian International	(France) Thomas Quéré	(Denmark) Simon Mollyhus (Denmark) Anders Kristiansen	10–15, 15–6, 6–15	(silver) Runner-up
2003	Athens International	(France) Thomas Quéré	(Bulgaria) Konstantin Dobrev (Bulgaria) Georgi Petrov	10–15, 6–15	(silver) Runner-up

BWF International Challenge tournament
BWF International Series tournament
