= David Hunt (badminton) =

English badminton player

Personal information
- Nationality: British (English)
- Born: November 1945 Portsmouth

David Richard Hunt (born 1945) is a former English badminton international player an also d a former national doubles champion.

== Biography ==
Hunt became the English National mixed doubles champion after winning the English National Badminton Championships in 1973 with Gillian Gilks. He was three times singles winner of the French Open in 1974, 1975 and 1977.
