= Anne Méniane =

French badminton player

Personal information
- Born: 11 June 1959 (age 67) Paris, France
- Spouse: Thierry Attia

Sport
- Country: France
- Sport: Badminton
- Retired: 1990

Women's singles; Women's doubles; Mixed doubles
- Career title: 20
Medal record
Women's badminton
Representing France
French Championships
Gold medal – first place	1978	Women's singles
Gold medal – first place	1978	Women's doubles
Gold medal – first place	1978	Mixed doubles
Gold medal – first place	1979	Women's singles
Gold medal – first place	1979	Women's doubles
Gold medal – first place	1979	Mixed doubles
Gold medal – first place	1980	Women's singles
Gold medal – first place	1980	Women's doubles
Gold medal – first place	1982	Women's singles
Gold medal – first place	1982	Women's doubles
Gold medal – first place	1984	Women's singles
Gold medal – first place	1984	Women's doubles
Gold medal – first place	1984	Mixed doubles
Gold medal – first place	1985	Women's singles
Gold medal – first place	1985	Women's doubles
Gold medal – first place	1985	Mixed doubles
Gold medal – first place	1986	Women's singles
Gold medal – first place	1986	Women's doubles
Gold medal – first place	1986	Mixed doubles
Gold medal – first place	1988	Mixed doubles

Anne Méniane, also reported as Anne Meniane, is a French badminton player. She was born on 11 June 1959 in Paris. She won 20 French national badminton championship titles in singles and doubles before retiring in 1989–90. She was singles champion in 1978, 1979, 1980, 1982, 1984, 1985 and 1986; won in the women's doubles in the same years; and won in the mixed doubles in 1978, 1979, 1984, 1985, 1986 and 1988.

Since then she has married Thierry Attia in Paris and had two kids. They have now settled in Montreal, Canada.
