= Vincent Laigle =

French badminton player

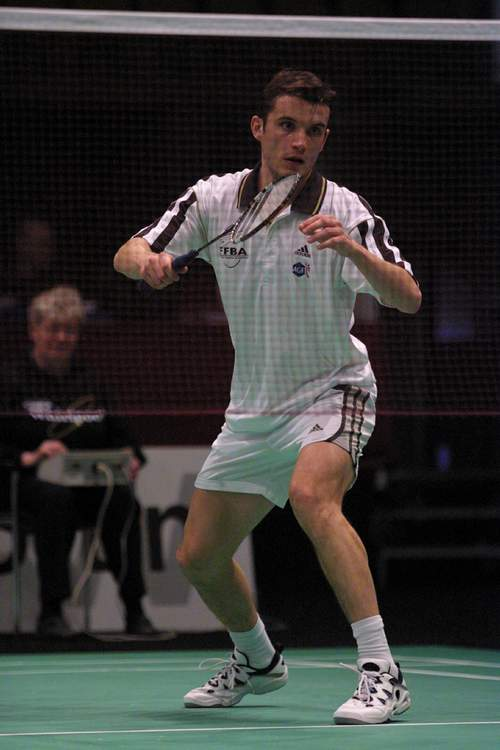

Personal information
- Born: 23 January 1973 (age 53) Audincourt, Doubs, France
- Height: 1.8 m (5 ft 11 in)

Sport
- Country: France
- Sport: Badminton
- Handedness: Right
- Retired: in 2004

Men's doubles
- Highest ranking: 13 (in MD with Svetoslav Stoyanov; November 2002)
- BWF profile

Vincent Laigle (born 23 January 1973) is a retired French badminton player. Currently he is coaching in the French badminton team.

== Achievements ==
=== IBF International ===
Men's doubles
Year	Tournament	Partner	Opponent	Score	Result
2003	Irish International	(France) Svetoslav Stoyanov	(France) Manuel Dubrulle (France) Mihail Popov	15–5, 15–8	(gold) Winner
2003	Bitburger International	(France) Svetoslav Stoyanov	(Poland) Michał Łogosz (Poland) Robert Mateusiak	5–15, 9–15	(silver) Runner-up
2003	Scottish International	(France) Svetoslav Stoyanov	(Poland) Michał Łogosz (Poland) Robert Mateusiak	5–15, 3–15	(silver) Runner-up
2003	Slovak International	(France) Svetoslav Stoyanov	(Bulgaria) Georgi Petrov (Bulgaria) Konstantin Dobrev	15–2, 15–2	(gold) Winner
2003	Dominican Republic International	(France) Svetoslav Stoyanov	(Spain) José Antonio Crespo (Spain) Sergio Llopis	8–15, 15–7, 15–12	(gold) Winner
2003	Croatian International	(Bulgaria) Svetoslav Stoyanov	(Denmark) Jonas Glyager Jensen (Denmark) Kasper Kiim Jensen	15–12, 15–6	(gold) Winner
2002	Le Volant d'Or de Toulouse	(Bulgaria) Svetoslav Stoyanov	(France) Manuel Dubrulle (Bulgaria) Mihail Popov	15–4, 15–2	(gold) Winner
2002	Czech International	(Bulgaria) Svetoslav Stoyanov	(Sweden) Imanuel Hirschfeld (Sweden) Jörgen Olsson	15–11, 15–6	(gold) Winner
2002	Spanish International	(Bulgaria) Svetoslav Stoyanov	(England) Graham Hurrell (England) Ian Sullivan	7–3, 2–7, 7–4, 8–7	(gold) Winner
2002	Croatian International	(Bulgaria) Svetoslav Stoyanov	(France) Manuel Dubrulle (Bulgaria) Mihail Popov	7–2, 7–4, 8–6	(gold) Winner
2001	Welsh International	(Bulgaria) Svetoslav Stoyanov	(France) Manuel Dubrulle (Bulgaria) Mihail Popov	7–2, 5–7, 7–3, 4–7, 7–3	(gold) Winner
2001	Czech International	(Bulgaria) Svetoslav Stoyanov	(France) Manuel Dubrulle (Bulgaria) Mihail Popov	3–7, 3–7, 1–7	(silver) Runner-up
2001	La Chaux-de-fonds International	(Bulgaria) Svetoslav Stoyanov	(France) Manuel Dubrulle (Bulgaria) Mihail Popov	7–4, 7–2, 7–1	(gold) Winner
2001	French International	(Bulgaria) Svetoslav Stoyanov	(England) David Lindley (England) Peter Jeffrey	7–1, 7–2, 7–2	(gold) Winner
2000	Le Volant d'Or de Toulouse	(Bulgaria) Svetoslav Stoyanov	(Germany) Kristof Hopp (Germany) Thomas Tesche	15–5, 15–9	(gold) Winner
1999	Spanish International	(France) Manuel Dubrulle	(England) Graham Hurrell (England) James Anderson	3–15, 10–15	(silver) Runner-up
1999	Iceland International	(France) Manuel Dubrulle	(Sweden) Fredrik Bergström (Sweden) Henrik Andersson	6–15, 13–15	(silver) Runner-up
1999	Slovenian International	(France) Manuel Dubrulle	(Poland) Piotr Żołądek (Poland) Przemysław Wacha	14–17, 15–10, 15–13	(gold) Winner
1999	Romanian International	(France) Manuel Dubrulle	(Austria) Harald Koch (Austria) Jürgen Koch	10–15, 13–15	(silver) Runner-up
1999	Waikato International	(France) Manuel Dubrulle	(Australia) David Bamford (Australia) Peter Blackburn	7–15, 7–15	(silver) Runner-up
1999	Portugal International	(France) Manuel Dubrulle	(Spain) José Antonio Crespo (Spain) Sergio Llopis	15–3, 10–15, 15–9	(gold) Winner
1998	Spanish International	(France) Manuel Dubrulle	(England) David Lindley (England) Michael Scholes	15–9, 15–11	(gold) Winner
1998	Le Volant d'Or de Toulouse	(France) Manuel Dubrulle	(Bulgaria) Mihail Popov (Bulgaria) Svetoslav Stoyanov	12–15, 15–6, 11–15	(silver) Runner-up
1998	Czech International	(France) Manuel Dubrulle	(England) Graham Hurrell (England) Peter Jeffrey	16–17, 7–15	(silver) Runner-up
1996	Slovenian International	(France) Manuel Dubrulle	(France) Bertrand Gallet (France) David Toupe	15–10, 15–12	(gold) Winner

Mixed doubles
Year	Tournament	Partner	Opponent	Score	Result
1997	Strasbourg International	(France) Sandrine Lefèvre	(Denmark) Janek Roos (Denmark) Rikke Broen	7–15, 4–15	(silver) Runner-up
1996	Slovenian International	(France) Tatiana Vattier	(France) Manuel Dubrulle (France) Sandrine Lefèvre	15–13, 5–15, 2–15	(silver) Runner-up
