= Henri Pellizza =

French badminton and tennis player

- Country (sports): France
- Born: 21 March 1920
- Died: 20 October 2001 (aged 81)
- Height: 183 cm (6 ft 0 in)

Singles

Grand Slam singles results
- French Open: 3R (1947, 1950, 1951, 1953)
- Wimbledon: 1R (1946)

Henri Pellizza (21 March 1920 — 20 October 2001) was a French badminton and tennis player.

Pellizza, younger brother of tennis player Pierre Pellizza, came from the city of Pau. His tennis achievements include three third round appearance at the French Championships. He won the 1942 and 1943 mixed doubles titles at the Tournoi de France (the war time Roland Garros). As a badminton player he claimed 18 national titles across singles and doubles. He represented France in the Thomas Cup badminton competition.
