= Le Volant d'Or de Toulouse =

Le Volant d'Or de Toulouse is an international badminton open tournament held annually in France since 1996. It was halted in 2001 and 2005, and with a prize money of 15.000 US Dollar it belonged to the BE-Circuit. It was last held in 2009.

== Previous winners ==
Year	Men's singles	Women's singles	Men's doubles	Women's doubles	Mixed doubles
1996	(Russia) Pavel Uvarov	(France) Sandra Dimbour	(Ukraine) Vladislav Druzchenko (Russia) Pavel Uvarov	(Bulgaria) Neli Boteva (Bulgaria) Diana Koleva	(Bulgaria) Svetoslav Stoyanov (Bulgaria) Diana Koleva
1997	(Switzerland) Thomas Wapp	(Ukraine) Elena Nozdran	(Bulgaria) Mihail Popov (Bulgaria) Svetoslav Stojanov	(Ukraine) Elena Nozdran (Ukraine) Viktoria Evtuschenko	(Ukraine) Valeriy Strelcov (Ukraine) Elena Nozdran
1998	(Ukraine) Konstantin Tatranov	(Ukraine) Elena Nozdran	(Bulgaria) Mihail Popov (Bulgaria) Svetoslav Stojanov	(Ukraine) Elena Nozdran (Ukraine) Viktoria Evtuschenko	(Germany) Michael Keck (Germany) Nicol Pitro
1999	(India) Pullela Gopichand	(Sweden) Marina Andrievskaya	(Bulgaria) Mihail Popov (Bulgaria) Svetoslav Stojanov	(Germany) Nicol Pitro (Germany) Anika Sietz	(Germany) Michael Keck (Germany) Nicol Pitro
2000	(China) Xie Yangchun	(Germany) Xu Huaiwen	(France) Vincent Laigle (Bulgaria) Svetoslav Stoyanov	(Germany) Nicol Pitro (Germany) Nicole Grether	(Germany) Björn Siegemund (Germany) Nicol Pitro
2001	No competition				
2002	(Denmark) Kasper Ødum	(China) Zeng Yaqiong	(France) Vincent Laigle (France) Svetoslav Stoyanov	(Japan) Akiko Nakashima (Japan) Chihiro Ohsaka	(Denmark) Jonas Glyager Jensen (Denmark) Majken Vange
2003	(India) Nikhil Kanetkar	(Denmark) Tine Rasmussen	(Belgium) Frédéric Mawet (Belgium) Wouter Claes	(Poland) Kamila Augustyn (Poland) Nadieżda Kostiuczyk	(Ukraine) Vladislav Druzchenko (Ukraine) Elena Nozdran
2004	(India) Chetan Anand	(Russia) Ella Karachkova	(India) Sanave Thomas (India) Rupesh Kumar	(Russia) Anastasia Russkikh (Bulgaria) Petya Nedelcheva	(France) Svetoslav Stoyanov (Russia) Anastasia Russkikh
2005	No competition				
2006	(Finland) Ville Lang	(Russia) Ella Karachkova	(Russia) Aleksandr Nikolaenko (Russia) Vitalij Durkin	(Russia) Nina Vislova (Russia) Valeria Sorokina	(Russia) Alexandr Russkikh (Russia) Anastasia Russkikh
2007	(Poland) Przemyslaw Wacha	(England) Tracey Hallam	(Denmark) Carsten Mogensen (Denmark) Mathias Boe	(Sweden) Elin Bergblom (Sweden) Johanna Persson	(Germany) Ingo Kindervater (Germany) Kathrin Piotrowski
2008	(Indonesia) Andre Kurniawan Tedjono	(Belarus) Olga Konon	(England) Richard Eidestedt (England) Andrew Ellis	(Indonesia) Shendy Puspa Irawati (Indonesia) Meiliana Jauhari	(Indonesia) Fran Kurniawan (Indonesia) Shendy Puspa Irawati
2009	(England) Rajiv Ouseph	(Russia) Ella Diehl	(England) Christopher Langridge (England) Robin Middleton	(Russia) Valeria Sorokina (Russia) Nina Vislova	(Poland) Robert Mateusiak (Poland) Nadieżda Kostiuczyk
2010- 2014	No competition				

== Performances by nation ==
Pos	Nation	MS	WS	MD	WD	XD	Total
1	Russia	1	3	1.5	9	6.5	9.5
2	Germany	1	2	3	1	3	7
3	France	1	0	2	0	1	3
3	Japan	0		0	1	0	1
3	Poland	0	1	3	0	0	4
6	Indonesia	1	0	0	1	1	3
7	Finland	1	0	0	0	0	1
7	Malaysia	1	0	1	0	0	2
7	Spain	2	0	0	0	0	2
7	Ukraine	2	0	0	0	0	7.5
11	Bulgaria	0	1	0	0	0	1
11	Chinese Taipei	1	0	0	0	0	1
11	Hong Kong	0	1	0	0	0	1
11	Ireland	0	0	0	0	1	1
11	Singapore	0	0	0	0	1	1
11	Turkey	0	1	0	0	0	1
11	Vietnam	0	1	0	0	0	1
Total		13	13	13	13	13	65
