= Svetoslav Stoyanov =

Bulgarian-French badminton player

Medal record

Men's Badminton

Representing France

European Championships
Bronze medal – third place	2008 Herning	Doubles

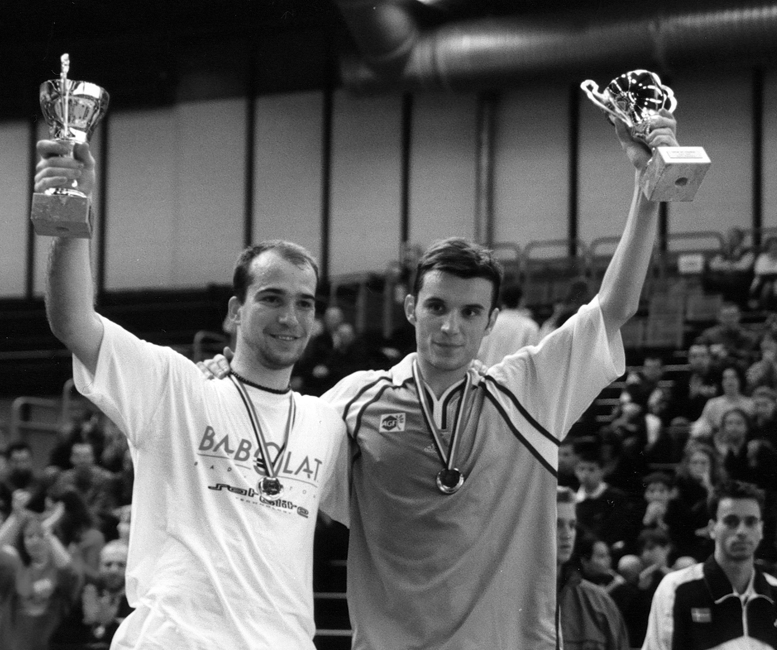
Stoyanov after winning the 2001 French Open with Vincent Laigle (Left)

Svetoslav Stoyanov (Bulgarian: Светослав Стоянов) (born 10 July 1976) is a male badminton player originally from Bulgaria, but later competed for France.

Stoyanov competed in badminton at the 2004 Summer Olympics in mixed doubles with partner Victoria Wright. They lost to Jens Eriksen and Mette Schjoldager of Denmark in the round of 32.

He won the bronze medal at the 2008 European Badminton Championships in men's doubles with Erwin Kehlhoffner.
