= Russian National Badminton Championships =

The Russian National Badminton Championships is a tournament organized to crown the best badminton players in Russia. The tournament started in 1992.

== Past winners ==
Year	Men's singles	Women's singles	Men's doubles	Women's doubles	Mixed doubles
1992	Andrey Antropov	Natalia Ivanova	Vyacheslav Elizarov; Sergey Melnikov	Natalia Ivanova; Julia Martynenko	Andrey Antropov; Olga Chernyshova
1993	Andrey Antropov	Marina Yakusheva	Andrey Antropov; Nikolai Zuyev	Natalia Ivanova; Julia Martynenko	Nikolai Zuyev; Marina Yakuscheva
1994	Alexey Sidorov	Marina Andrievskaia	Nikolai Zuyev; Eugeniy Nazarenko	Marina Andrievskaia; Elena Rybkina	Nikolai Zuyev; Marina Andrievskaia
1995	Vladislav Tikhomirov	Elena Rybkina	Nikolai Zuyev; Pavel Uvarov	Marina Yakusheva; Svetlana Alferova	Sergey Melnikov; Marina Yakusheva
1996	Andrey Antropov	Marina Yakusheva	Andrey Antropov; Nikolai Zuyev	Marina Yakusheva; Nadezhda Chervjakova	Sergey Melnikov; Marina Yakusheva
1997	Pavel Uvarov	Ella Karachkova	Andrey Antropov; Nikolai Zuyev	Natalia Gorodnicheva; Elena Sukhareva	Sergey Melnikov; Svetlana Alferova
1998	Stanislav Pukhov	Elena Sukhareva	Andrey Antropov; Nikolai Zuyev	Natalia Gorodnicheva; Elena Yakusheva	Vadim Itzkov; Elena Sukhareva
1999	Pavel Uvarov	Ella Karachkova	Pavel Uvarov; Vjacheslav Vorobjov	Nadezhda Chervjakova; Natalia Djachkova	Pavel Uvarov; Ella Karachkova
2000	Pavel Uvarov	Marina Yakusheva	Aleksandr Nikolaenko; Nikolaj Nikolaenko	Julia Martynenko; Irina Rusljakova	Artur Khachaturjan; Marina Yakusheva
2001	Stanislav Pukhov	Ella Karachkova	Stanislav Pukhov; Andrei Jolobov	Ella Karachkova; Anastasia Russkikh	Alexandr Russkikh; Anastasia Russkikh
2002	Egor Izotov	Ella Karachkova	Aleksandr Nikolaenko; Nikolaj Nikolaenko	Anastasia Russkih; Ekaterina Ananina	Nikolai Zuyev; Marina Yakusheva
2003	Stanislav Pukhov	Ella Karachkova	Stanislav Pukhov; Nikolai Zuyev	Natalia Gorodnicheva; Elena Sukhareva	Nikolai Zuyev; Marina Yakusheva
2004	Evgeni Isakov	Ella Karachkova	Aleksandr Nikolaenko; Vitalij Durkin	Elena Shimko; Marina Yakusheva	Nikolai Zuyev; Marina Yakusheva
2005	Stanislav Pukhov	Ella Karachkova	Aleksandr Nikolaenko; Vitalij Durkin	Anastasia Russkikh; Ella Karachkova	Nikolai Zuyev; Marina Yakusheva
2006	Sergey Ivlev	Ella Karachkova	Aleksandr Nikolaenko; Vitalij Durkin	Nina Vislova; Valeria Sorokina	Stanislav Pukhov; Marina Yakusheva
2007	Stanislav Pukhov	Ella Karachkova	Aleksandr Nikolaenko; Vitalij Durkin	Nina Vislova; Valeria Sorokina	Aleksandr Nikolaenko; Nina Vislova
2008	Vladimir Ivanov	Ella Karachkova	Alexey Vasiliev; Evgenij Dremin	Nina Vislova; Valeria Sorokina	Aleksandr Nikolaenko; Nina Vislova
2009	Vladimir Malkov	Ella Karachkova	Aleksandr Nikolaenko; Vitalij Durkin	Anastasia Russkikh; Ekaterina Ananina	Evgenij Dremin; Anastasia Russkikh
2011	Vladimir Ivanov	Ella Diehl	Andrey Ashmarin; Nikolai Ukk	Nina Vislova; Valeria Sorokina	Aleksandr Nikolaenko; Valeria Sorokina
2012	Vladimir Ivanov	Olga Golovanova	Sergey Lunev; Evgenij Dremin	Nina Vislova; Valeria Sorokina	Aleksandr Nikolaenko; Valeria Sorokina
2013	Vladimir Malkov	Ella Diehl	Vladimir Ivanov; Ivan Sozonov	Nina Vislova; Valeria Sorokina	Vladimir Ivanov; Valeria Sorokina
2014	Vladimir Malkov	Ksenia Polikarpova	Vladimir Ivanov; Ivan Sozonov	Nina Vislova; Anastasia Chervyakova	Vitalij Durkin; Nina Vislova
2015	Vladimir Malkov	Evgeniya Kosetskaya	Andrey Ashmarin; Aleksandr Nikolaenko	Olga Morozova; Anastasia Chervyakova	Evgenij Dremin; Evgenia Dimova
2016	Vladimir Malkov	Evgeniya Kosetskaya	Konstantin Abramov; Alexandr Zinchenko	Olga Morozova; Anastasia Chervyakova	Evgenij Dremin; Evgenia Dimova
2017	Sergey Sirant	Evgeniya Kosetskaya	Vladimir Ivanov; Ivan Sozonov	Ekaterina Bolotova; Alina Davletova	Ivan Sozonov; Evgeniya Kosetskaya
2018	Sergey Sirant	Evgeniya Kosetskaya	Vitalij Durkin; Nikolai Ukk	Evgeniya Kosetskaya; Irina Khlebko	Rodion Alimov; Alina Davletova
2019	Vladimir Malkov	Evgeniya Kosetskaya	Alexandr Zichenko Nikita Khakimov	Olga Morozova Anastasia Akchurina	Rodion Alimov Alina Davletova
2020	Vladimir Malkov	Evgeniya Kosetskaya	Alexandr Zichenko Nikita Khakimov	Olga Morozova Anastasia Akchurina	Rodlion Alimov Alina Davletova
2021	Vladimir Malkov	Evgeniya Kosetskaya	Konstantin Abramov Rodlion Alimov	Anastasia Akchurina Evgeniya Kosetskaya	Rodlion Alimov Alina Davletova
2022	Vladimir Malkov	Evgeniya Kosetskaya	Vladimir Ivanov; Ivan Sozonov	Alina Davletova Evgeniya Kosetskaya	Rodlion Alimov Alina Davletova
2023	Sergey Sirant	Evgeniya Kosetskaya	Vladimir Ivanov; Ivan Sozonov	Alina Davletova Ekaterina Malkova	Ivan Sozonov Anastasia Akchurina
