= Nina Vislova =

Russian badminton player (born 1986)

Nina Vislova Нина Вислова
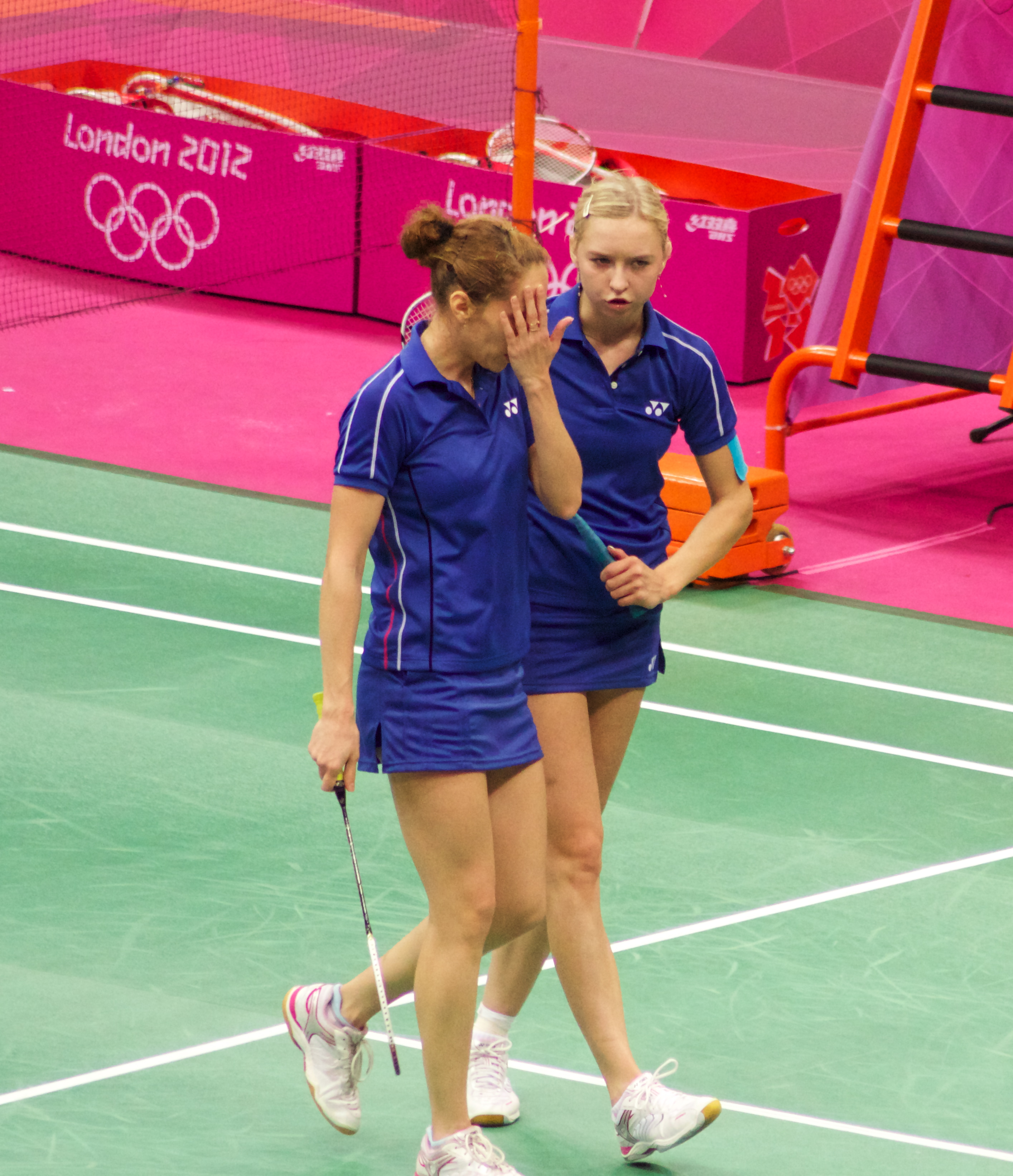

Personal information
- Born: Nina Gennadyevna Vislova; Нина Геннадьевна Вислова; 4 October 1986 (age 40) Moscow, Russian SFSR, Soviet Union
- Height: 1.73 m (5 ft 8 in)
- Weight: 59 kg (130 lb)

Sport
- Country: Russia
- Sport: Badminton
- Handedness: Left
- Coached by: Elena Gachinskaya; Vladimir Larchenko

Women's & mixed doubles
- Highest ranking: 4 (WD with Valeria Sorokina, 6 January 2011); 16 (XD with Vitalij Durkin, 18 March 2010)
- BWF profile
Medal record
Women's badminton
Representing Russia
Olympic Games
Bronze medal – third place	2012 London	Women's doubles
European Championships
Gold medal – first place	2010 Manchester	Women's doubles
Bronze medal – third place	2008 Herning	Women's doubles
Bronze medal – third place	2012 Karlskrona	Women's doubles
European Mixed Team Championships
Silver medal – second place	2017 Lubin	Mixed team
Bronze medal – third place	2015 Leuven	Mixed team
Bronze medal – third place	2019 Copenhagen	Mixed team
European Women's Team Championships
Silver medal – second place	2010 Warsaw	Women's team
Silver medal – second place	2014 Basel	Women's team
Bronze medal – third place	2018 Kazan	Women's team
Summer Universiade
Bronze medal – third place	2013 Kazan	Mixed doubles
European Junior Championships
Gold medal – first place	2003 Esbjerg	Girls' doubles
Gold medal – first place	2005 Den Bosch	Girls' doubles
Silver medal – second place	2003 Esbjerg	Mixed doubles
Silver medal – second place	2005 Den Bosch	Mixed team
Bronze medal – third place	2001 Spała	Mixed team
Bronze medal – third place	2003 Esbjerg	Mixed team
Bronze medal – third place	2005 Den Bosch	Mixed doubles

Nina Gennadyevna Vislova (Russian: Нина Геннадьевна Вислова; born 4 October 1986) is a badminton player from Russia. Along with her partner Valeria Sorokina, she is the only Russian Olympic medalist in badminton, winning the bronze medal in the 2012 London Olympics.

== Career ==
Vislova won four medals at the European Junior Championships: two gold medals in women's doubles (2003 and 2005), a silver medal in mixed doubles (2003), and a bronze medal also in mixed doubles (2005). Nina also won at the 2006 U.S. Open Badminton Championships in the women's and mixed doubles event. She won the gold medal at the 2010 European Badminton Championships and bronze medals in 2008 and 2012 in women's doubles with Valeria Sorokina. In Russia, her home country, she has won eight national titles as of 2014.

She played in women's doubles discipline at the 2012 Summer Olympics with Valeria Sorokina and finished in third place after winning bronze medal match against Canadian women's doubles players, Alex Bruce and Michelle Li in straight games.

== Achievements ==
=== Olympic Games ===
Women's doubles
Year	Venue	Partner	Opponent	Score	Result
2012	Wembley Arena, London, Great Britain	(Russia) Valeria Sorokina	(Canada) Alex Bruce (Canada) Michelle Li	21–9, 21–10	Bronze

=== European Championships ===
Women's doubles
Year	Venue	Partner	Opponent	Score	Result
2008	Messecenter, Herning, Denmark	(Russia) Valeria Sorokina	(Denmark) Lena Frier Kristiansen (Denmark) Kamilla Rytter Juhl	19–21, 20–22	Bronze
2010	Manchester Evening News Arena, Manchester, England	(Russia) Valeria Sorokina	(Bulgaria) Petya Nedelcheva (Russia) Anastasia Russkikh	21–18, 21–14	Gold
2012	Telenor Arena, Karlskrona, Sweden	(Russia) Valeria Sorokina	(Denmark) Line Damkjær Kruse (Denmark) Marie Røpke	20–22, 21–13, 12–21	Bronze

=== Summer Universiade ===
Mixed doubles
Year	Venue	Partner	Opponent	Score	Result
2013	Tennis Academy, Kazan, Russia	(Russia) Vladimir Ivanov	(South Korea) Kim Gi-jung (South Korea) Kim So-young	22–20, 19–21, 17–21	Bronze

=== European Junior Championships ===
Girls' doubles
Year	Venue	Partner	Opponent	Score	Result	Ref.
2003	Esbjerg Badminton Center, Esbjerg, Denmark	(Russia) Valeria Sorokina	(Germany) Therésè Nawrath (Germany) Birgit Overzier	5–11, 11–5, 11–0	Gold	
2005	De Maaspoort, Den Bosch, Netherlands	(Russia) Olga Kozlova	(Denmark) Christinna Pedersen (Denmark) Tine Kruse	13–15, 15–7, 17–16	Gold	

Mixed doubles
Year	Venue	Partner	Opponent	Score	Result	Ref.
2003	Esbjerg Badminton Center, Esbjerg, Denmark	(Russia) Dmitri Pankov	(Germany) Marc Zwiebler (Germany) Birgit Overzier	7–11, 1–11	Silver	
2005	De Maaspoort, Den Bosch, Netherlands	(Russia) Vladimir Malkov	(England) Robert Adcock (England) Jennifer Wallwork	4–15, 5–15	Bronze	

=== BWF Grand Prix ===
The BWF Grand Prix had two levels, the Grand Prix and Grand Prix Gold. It was a series of badminton tournaments sanctioned by the Badminton World Federation (BWF) and played between 2007 and 2017. The World Badminton Grand Prix was sanctioned by the International Badminton Federation from 1983 to 2006.

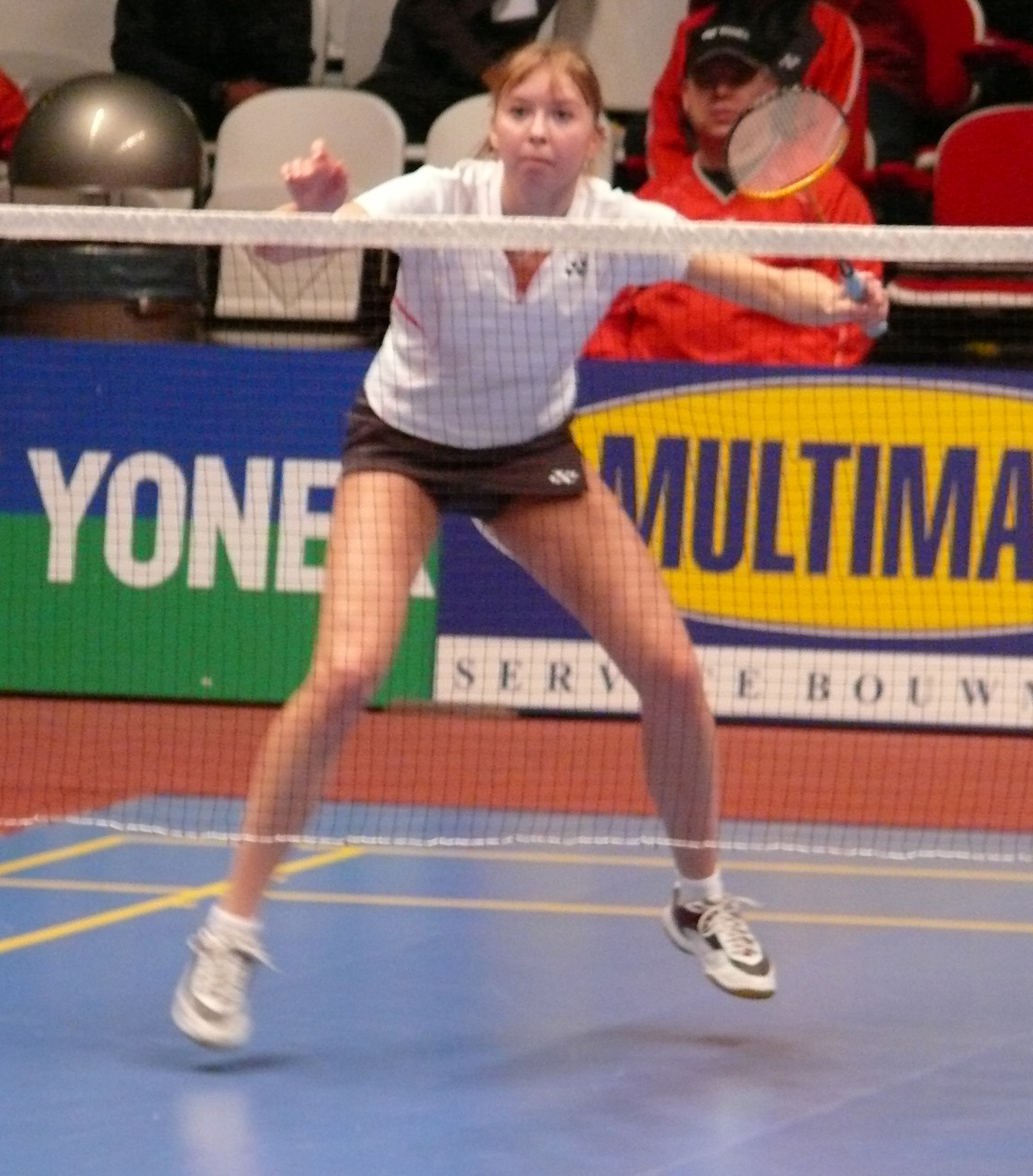
Nina Vislova (RUS)

Women's singles
Year	Tournament	Opponent	Score	Result
2005	Russian Open	(Russia) Ella Karachkova	11–4, 5–11, 11–4	(gold) Winner

Women's doubles
Year	Tournament	Partner	Opponent	Score	Result
2005	Russian Open	(Russia) Valeria Sorokina	(Russia) Ekaterina Ananina (Russia) Anna Larchenko	15–11, 15–8	(gold) Winner
2006	U.S. Open	(Russia) Valeria Sorokina	(Russia) Ella Karachkova (Russia) Marina Yakusheva	21–15, 21–18	(gold) Winner
2006	Bulgaria Open	(Russia) Valeria Sorokina	(Indonesia) Meiliana Jauhari (Indonesia) Purwati	10–21, 9–21	(silver) Runner-up
2007	Dutch Open	(Russia) Valeria Sorokina	(Russia) Ekaterina Ananina (Russia) Anastasia Russkikh	22–20, 15–21, 13–21	(silver) Runner-up
2008	Russian Open	(Russia) Valeria Sorokina	(Bulgaria) Petya Nedelcheva (Bulgaria) Dimitria Popstoikova	21–18, 21–8	(gold) Winner
2009	Russian Open	(Russia) Valeria Sorokina	(Russia) Tatjana Bibik (Russia) Olga Golovanova	21–8, 22–20	(gold) Winner
2009	Dutch Open	(Russia) Valeria Sorokina	(Germany) Sandra Marinello (Germany) Birgit Overzier	21–13, 21–17	(gold) Winner
2010	Russian Open	(Russia) Valeria Sorokina	(Japan) Yuriko Miki (Japan) Koharu Yonemoto	21–18, 21–18	(gold) Winner
2010	Dutch Open	(Russia) Valeria Sorokina	(Japan) Mizuki Fujii (Japan) Reika Kakiiwa	21–19, 21–19	(gold) Winner
2011	Russian Open	(Russia) Valeria Sorokina	(Japan) Misaki Matsutomo (Japan) Ayaka Takahashi	22–20, 21–18	(gold) Winner
2012	Russian Open	(Russia) Valeria Sorokina	(Russia) Tatjana Bibik (Russia) Anastasia Chervaykova	Walkover	(gold) Winner
2012	U.S. Open	(Russia) Valeria Sorokina	(Japan) Misaki Matsutomo (Japan) Ayaka Takahashi	19–21, 17–21	(silver) Runner-up
2013	Russian Open	(Russia) Anastasia Chervaykova	(Russia) Irina Khlebko (Russia) Ksenia Polikarpova	21–16, 21–18	(gold) Winner

Mixed doubles
Year	Tournament	Partner	Opponent	Score	Result
2006	U.S. Open	(Russia) Sergey Ivlev	(Russia) Vitalij Durkin (Russia) Valeria Sorokina	15–21, 21–15, 21–16	(gold) Winner
2006	Bulgaria Open	(Russia) Aleksandr Nikolaenko	(Denmark) Mikkel Delbo Larsen (Denmark) Mie Schjøtt-Kristensen	22–20, 22–20	(gold) Winner
2008	Russian Open	(Russia) Vitalij Durkin	(Russia) Aleksandr Nikolaenko (Russia) Valeria Sorokina	19–21, 19–21	(silver) Runner-up
2009	Russian Open	(Russia) Vitalij Durkin	(Russia) Aleksandr Nikolaenko (Russia) Valeria Sorokina	21–16, 21–16	(gold) Winner
2009	Dutch Open	(Russia) Vitalij Durkin	(Russia) Aleksandr Nikolaenko (Russia) Valeria Sorokina	21–13, 16–21, 12–21	(silver) Runner-up
2010	Russian Open	(Russia) Vitalij Durkin	(Russia) Aleksandr Nikolaenko (Russia) Valeria Sorokina	21–8, 14–21, 16–21	(silver) Runner-up
2011	Vietnam Open	(Russia) Vitalij Durkin	(South Korea) Chung Eui-seok (South Korea) Yoo Hyun-young	21–16, 21–13	(gold) Winner
2012	Russian Open	(Russia) Vitalij Durkin	(Russia) Aleksandr Nikolaenko (Russia) Valeria Sorokina	19–21, 17–21	(silver) Runner-up
2013	Russian Open	(Russia) Vitalij Durkin	(Russia) Ivan Sozonov (Russia) Tatjana Bibik	17–21, 22–24	(silver) Runner-up
2015	Scottish Open	(Russia) Vitalij Durkin	(France) Ronan Labar (France) Émilie Lefel	21–14, 21–12	(gold) Winner

BWF Grand Prix Gold tournament
BWF Grand Prix tournament

=== BWF International Challenge/Series ===
Women's doubles
Year	Tournament	Partner	Opponent	Score	Result
2004	Russian International	(Russia) Valeria Sorokina	(Russia) Irina Ruslyakova (Russia) Anastasia Russkikh	2–15, 3–15	(silver) Runner-up
2005	Swedish International	(Russia) Valeria Sorokina	(Japan) Noriko Okuma (Japan) Miyuki Tai	2–15, 4–15	(silver) Runner-up
2005	Italian International	(Russia) Valeria Sorokina	(Russia) Ella Karachkova (Russia) Marina Yakusheva	2–15, 15–8, 15–5	(gold) Winner
2005	Scottish International	(Russia) Valeria Sorokina	(Sweden) Elin Bergblom (Sweden) Johanna Persson	15–5, 15–10	(gold) Winner
2006	Italian International	(Russia) Valeria Sorokina	(China) Cai Jiani (China) Yu Qi	12–21, 16–21	(silver) Runner-up
2006	Belgian International	(Russia) Valeria Sorokina	(Russia) Elena Shimko (Russia) Marina Yakusheva	13–21, 13–21	(silver) Runner-up
2006	Polish International	(Russia) Valeria Sorokina	(Poland) Kamila Augustyn (Poland) Nadieżda Kostiuczyk	21–14, 12–21, 18–21	(silver) Runner-up
2006	Le Volant d'Or de Toulouse	(Russia) Valeria Sorokina	(Russia) Ekaterina Ananina (Russia) Anastasia Russkikh	21–10, 18–21, 21–14	(gold) Winner
2006	Scottish International	(Russia) Valeria Sorokina	(Russia) Elena Shimko (Russia) Marina Yakusheva	20–22, 13–21	(silver) Runner-up
2007	White Nights	(Russia) Valeria Sorokina	(Russia) Ekaterina Ananina (Russia) Anastasia Russkikh	15–21, 14–21	(silver) Runner-up
2007	Bulgarian International	(Russia) Valeria Sorokina	(Malaysia) Lim Pek Siah (Malaysia) Haw Chiou Hwee	16–21, 21–13, 21–5	(gold) Winner
2007	Norwegian International	(Russia) Valeria Sorokina	(Russia) Ekaterina Ananina (Russia) Anastasia Russkikh	14–21, 22–20, 13–21	(silver) Runner-up
2007	Scottish International	(Russia) Valeria Sorokina	(England) Mariana Agathangelou (England) Gabrielle White	21–14, 21–14	(gold) Winner
2007	Italian International	(Russia) Valeria Sorokina	(Russia) Ekaterina Ananina (Russia) Anastasia Russkikh	15–21, 24–26	(silver) Runner-up
2008	European Circuit Finals	(Russia) Valeria Sorokina	(Russia) Ekaterina Ananina (Russia) Anastasia Russkikh	21–19, 13–21, 15–21	(silver) Runner-up
2008	White Nights	(Russia) Valeria Sorokina	(Russia) Ekaterina Ananina (Russia) Anastasia Russkikh	12–21, 18–21	(silver) Runner-up
2008	Belgian International	(Russia) Valeria Sorokina	(Netherlands) Rachel van Cutsen (Netherlands) Paulien van Dooremalen	21–10, 21–12	(gold) Winner
2008	Bulgarian International	(Russia) Valeria Sorokina	(Sweden) Emelie Lennartsson (Sweden) Emma Wengberg	21–16, 21–6	(gold) Winner
2008	Italian International	(Russia) Valeria Sorokina	(Sweden) Emelie Lennartsson (Sweden) Emma Wengberg	23–21, 21–14	(gold) Winner
2009	Finnish International	(Russia) Valeria Sorokina	(Germany) Sandra Marinello (Germany) Birgit Overzier	16–21, 21–12, 21–13	(gold) Winner
2009	Le Volant d'Or de Toulouse	(Russia) Valeria Sorokina	(France) Laura Choinet (France) Weny Rahmawati	21–12, 15–21, 21–9	(gold) Winner
2009	White Nights	(Russia) Valeria Sorokina	(Russia) Anastasia Prokopenko (Russia) Anastasia Russkikh	21–19, 13–21, 21–17	(gold) Winner
2009	Welsh International	(Russia) Valeria Sorokina	(Malaysia) Anita Raj Kaur (Malaysia) Joanne Quay	21–14, 21–16	(gold) Winner
2009	Scottish Open	(Russia) Valeria Sorokina	(England) Mariana Agathangelou (Scotland) Emma Mason	21–16, 21–16	(gold) Winner
2010	White Nights	(Russia) Valeria Sorokina	(Bulgaria) Petya Nedelcheva (Russia) Anastasia Russkikh	21–17, 21–15	(gold) Winner
2011	Dutch International	(Russia) Valeria Sorokina	(Netherlands) Lotte Jonathans (Netherlands) Paulien van Dooremalen	24–22, 21–12	(gold) Winner
2011	Czech International	(Russia) Valeria Sorokina	(Canada) Nicole Grether (Canada) Charmaine Reid	21–10, 21–16	(gold) Winner
2011	Italian International	(Russia) Valeria Sorokina	(Germany) Sandra Marinello (Germany) Birgit Michels	21–14, 21–9	(gold) Winner
2013	Swiss International	(Russia) Anastasia Chervyakova	(Sweden) Emelie Lennartsson (Sweden) Emma Wengberg	21–18, 18–21, 21–13	(gold) Winner
2014	Estonian International	(Russia) Anastasia Chervyakova	(Netherlands) Myke Halkema (Netherlands) Gayle Mahulette	21–9, 21–12	(gold) Winner
2014	Polish Open	(Russia) Anastasia Chervyakova	(Japan) Ayane Kurihara (Japan) Naru Shinoya	15–21, 21–17, 22–20	(gold) Winner
2014	Bahrain International Challenge	(Russia) Anastasia Chervyakova	(Russia) Ekaterina Bolotova (Russia) Evgeniya Kosetskaya	6–21, 15–21	(silver) Runner-up
2015	Swedish Masters	(Russia) Anastasia Chervyakova	(England) Sophie Brown (England) Kate Robertshaw	17–21, 23–21, 21–14	(gold) Winner

Mixed doubles
Year	Tournament	Partner	Opponent	Score	Result
2006	Scottish International	(Russia) Aleksandr Nikolaenko	(Russia) Vitalij Durkin (Russia) Valeria Sorokina	20–22, 11–21	(silver) Runner-up
2007	Austrian International	(Russia) Aleksandr Nikolaenko	(Russia) Vitalij Durkin (Russia) Valeria Sorokina	14–21, 20–22	(silver) Runner-up
2007	White Nights	(Russia) Aleksandr Nikolaenko	(Russia) Nikolai Ukk (Russia) Tatjana Bibik	21–17, 21–14	(gold) Winner
2007	Bulgarian International	(Russia) Aleksandr Nikolaenko	(France) Svetoslav Stoyanov (France) Élodie Eymard	21–18, 19–21, 21–15	(gold) Winner
2007	Scottish International	(Russia) Aleksandr Nikolaenko	(England) Robert Blair (Scotland) Imogen Bankier	21–15, 20–22, 9–21	(silver) Runner-up
2007	Italian International	(Russia) Aleksandr Nikolaenko	(Russia) Vitalij Durkin (Russia) Valeria Sorokina	21–15, 18–21, 21–16	(gold) Winner
2008	European Circuit Finals	(Russia) Alexander Nikolaenko	(Belgium) Wouter Claes (Belgium) Nathalie Descamps	21–7, 21–19	(gold) Winner
2008	White Nights	(Russia) Vitalij Durkin	(Poland) Robert Mateusiak (Poland) Nadieżda Kostiuczyk	21–18, 21–14	(gold) Winner
2008	Belgian International	(Russia) Vitalij Durkin	(Scotland) Watson Briggs (Scotland) Jillie Cooper	21–13, 21–9	(gold) Winner
2008	Bulgarian International	(Russia) Vitalij Durkin	(Ukraine) Valeriy Atrashchenkov (Ukraine) Elena Prus	21–16, 21–10	(gold) Winner
2008	Hungarian International	(Russia) Vitalij Durkin	(Russia) Ivan Sozonov (Russia) Anastasia Prokopenko	21–11, 21–19	(gold) Winner
2008	Italian International	(Russia) Vitalij Durkin	(Germany) Johannes Schöttler (Germany) Birgit Overzier	20–22, 21–19, 21–18	(gold) Winner
2009	Finnish International	(Russia) Vitalij Durkin	(England) Robin Middleton (Scotland) Imogen Bankier	21–18, 21–13	(gold) Winner
2009	White Nights	(Russia) Vitalij Durkin	(Indonesia) Flandy Limpele (Russia) Anastasia Russkikh	14–21, 23–25	(silver) Runner-up
2009	Welsh International	(Russia) Vitalij Durkin	(Russia) Aleksandr Nikolaenko (Russia) Valeria Sorokina	21–13, 21–13	(gold) Winner
2011	Swiss International	(Russia) Vitalij Durkin	(Russia) Sergey Lunev (Russia) Evgenia Dimova	22–20, 25–23	(gold) Winner
2011	Italian International	(Russia) Vitalij Durkin	(Russia) Aleksandr Nikolaenko (Russia) Valeria Sorokina	21–13, 18–21, 17–21	(silver) Runner-up
2013	Swiss International	(Russia) Vitalij Durkin	(France) Ronan Labar (France) Émilie Lefel	21–14, 17–21, 21–18	(gold) Winner
2013	Welsh International	(Russia) Vitalij Durkin	(England) Chris Langridge (England) Heather Olver	17–21, 21–10, 13–21	(silver) Runner-up
2014	Estonian International	(Russia) Vitalij Durkin	(Russia) Anatoliy Yartsev (Russia) Evgeniya Kosetskaya	24–22, 14–21, 21–16	(gold) Winner
2014	Polish Open	(Russia) Vitalij Durkin	(Poland) Robert Mateusiak (Poland) Agnieszka Wojtkowska	21–15, 16–7 retired	(gold) Winner
2014	Swiss International	(Russia) Vitalij Durkin	(France) Ronan Labar (France) Émilie Lefel	9–11, 7–11, 9–11	(silver) Runner-up
2014	Bahrain International Challenge	(Russia) Vitalij Durkin	(Indonesia) Fran Kurniawan (Indonesia) Komala Dewi	21–8, 21–10	(gold) Winner
2015	Swedish Masters	(Russia) Vitalij Durkin	(Netherlands) Jacco Arends (Netherlands) Selena Piek	17–21, 21–17, 14–21	(silver) Runner-up
2015	Czech Open	(Russia) Vitalij Durkin	(Germany) Michael Fuchs (Germany) Birgit Michels	21–18, 21–19	(gold) Winner
2016	Peru International	(Russia) Vitalij Durkin	(Russia) Evgenij Dremin (Russia) Evgenia Dimova	25–23, 21–14	(gold) Winner
2016	Tahiti International	(Russia) Vitalij Durkin	(United States) Phillip Chew (United States) Jamie Subandhi	21–18, 16–21, 21–8	(gold) Winner
2016	White Nights	(Russia) Vitalij Durkin	(Germany) Michael Fuchs (Germany) Birgit Michels	9–21, 12–21	(silver) Runner-up

BWF International Challenge tournament
BWF International Series tournament
BWF Future Series tournament
