= Nikolai Ukk =

Russian badminton player (born 1980)

Personal information
- Born: Nikolai Yurevich Ukk (Николай Юрьевич Укк); 20 February 1980 (age 46)

Sport
- Country: Russia
- Sport: Badminton

Men's singles & doubles
- Highest ranking: 171 (MS 2 September 2011); 77 (MD 27 September 2012); 137 (XD 2 June 2011)
- BWF profile

Nikolai Yurevich Ukk (Russian: Николай Юрьевич Укк; born 20 February 1980) is a Russian badminton player. He won the men's doubles title at the 2011 National Championships partnering with Andrey Ashmarin. Currently residing in Saint Petersburg, Ukk works as a trainer-teacher of the badminton at the Kometa Sports School. In 2013, he won Hellas International tournament in men's doubles event with his partner Nikolaj Nikolaenko.

== Achievements ==
=== BWF International Challenge/Series ===
Men's doubles
Year	Tournament	Partner	Opponent	Score	Result
1997	Baltic International	(Russia) Mikhail Kelj	(Russia) Victor Maljutin (Russia) Alexandr Russkikh	17–14, 17–16	(gold) Winner
2011	Cyprus International	(Russia) Nikolaj Nikolaenko	(Denmark) Theis Christiansen (Denmark) Niclas Nøhr	17–21, 13–21	(silver) Runner-up
2012	Finnish Open	(Russia) Nikolaj Nikolaenko	(Russia) Vladimir Ivanov (Russia) Ivan Sozonov	10–21, 16–21	(silver) Runner-up
2013	Hellas International	(Russia) Nikolaj Nikolaenko	(Vietnam) Đỗ Tuấn Đức (Vietnam) Phạm Hồng Nam	21–14, 21–16	(gold) Winner
2018	Estonian International	(Russia) Andrey Parakhodin	(Germany) Peter Käsbauer (Germany) Johannes Pistorius	14–21, 21–18, 21–19	(gold) Winner
2018	Italian International	(Russia) Vitalij Durkin	(Denmark) Mathias Bay-Smidt (Denmark) Lasse Mølhede	11–21, 11–21	(silver) Runner-up
2019	White Nights	(Russia) Vitalij Durkin	(Russia) Nikita Khakimov (Russia) Alexandr Zinchenko	20–22, 16–21	(silver) Runner-up

Mixed doubles
Year	Tournament	Partner	Opponent	Score	Result
2007	White Nights	(Russia) Tatjana Bibik	(Russia) Aleksandr Nikolaenko (Russia) Nina Vislova	17–21, 14–21	(silver) Runner-up

BWF International Challenge tournament
BWF International Series tournament
BWF Future Series tournament
