= Aleksandr Nikolaenko =

Russian badminton player (born 1980)

Aleksandr Nikolaenko Александр Николаенко
Personal information
- Born: Aleksandr Nikolaevich Nikolaenko (Александр Николаевич Николаенко); 6 June 1980 (age 46) Novosibirsk, Russian SFSR, Soviet Union
- Height: 1.88 m (6 ft 2 in)
- Weight: 94 kg (207 lb)

Sport
- Country: Russia
- Sport: Badminton
- Handedness: Right

Men's & mixed doubles
- Highest ranking: 27 (MD with Vitalij Durkin, 18 March 2010); 11 (XD with Valeria Sorokina, 29 March 2012)
- BWF profile
Medal record
Men's badminton
Representing Russia
European Mixed Team Championships
Bronze medal – third place	2009 Liverpool	Mixed team
Bronze medal – third place	2011 Amsterdam	Mixed team
European Junior Championships
Silver medal – second place	1999 Glasgow	Mixed team

Aleksandr Nikolaevich Nikolaenko (Russian: Александр Николаевич Николаенко; born 6 June 1980) is an internationally elite badminton player. Nikolaenko was part of the Favorit Ramenskoe badminton club, and in 2000, he was selected to join the national team. He was the bronze medallist at the European Mixed Team Badminton Championships in 2009 and 2011. Nikolaenko is also the champion at the National Championships in the men's and mixed doubles events. In 2012, he competed at the Summer Olympics in London.

== Achievements ==
=== BWF Grand Prix ===
The BWF Grand Prix had two levels, the Grand Prix and Grand Prix Gold. It was a series of badminton tournaments sanctioned by the Badminton World Federation (BWF) and played between 2007 and 2017. The World Badminton Grand Prix was sanctioned by the International Badminton Federation from 1983 to 2006.

Men's doubles
Year	Tournament	Partner	Opponent	Score	Result
2006	U.S. Open	(Russia) Vitalij Durkin	(United States) Tony Gunawan (United States) Halim Haryanto	10–21, 19–21	(silver) Runner-up
2008	Russian Open	(Russia) Vitalij Durkin	(Russia) Vladimir Ivanov (Russia) Ivan Sozonov	21–11, 21–15	(gold) Winner
2009	Russian Open	(Russia) Vitalij Durkin	(Russia) Vladimir Ivanov (Russia) Ivan Sozonov	19–21, 19–21	(silver) Runner-up
2010	Russian Open	(Russia) Vitalij Durkin	(Russia) Vladimir Ivanov (Russia) Ivan Sozonov	17–21, 21–10, 18–21	(silver) Runner-up
2012	Russian Open	(Russia) Vitalij Durkin	(Russia) Vladimir Ivanov (Russia) Ivan Sozonov	18–21, 15–21	(silver) Runner-up

Mixed doubles
Year	Tournament	Partner	Opponent	Score	Result
2006	Bulgaria Open	(Russia) Nina Vislova	(Denmark) Mikkel Delbo Larsen (Denmark) Mie Schjøtt-Kristensen	22–20, 22–20	(gold) Winner
2008	Russian Open	(Russia) Valeria Sorokina	(Russia) Vitalij Durkin (Russia) Nina Vislova	21–19, 21–19	(gold) Winner
2009	Russian Open	(Russia) Valeria Sorokina	(Russia) Vitalij Durkin (Russia) Nina Vislova	16–21, 16–21	(silver) Runner-up
2009	Dutch Open	(Russia) Valeria Sorokina	(Russia) Vitalij Durkin (Russia) Nina Vislova	13–21, 21–16, 21–12	(gold) Winner
2010	Russian Open	(Russia) Valeria Sorokina	(Russia) Vitalij Durkin (Russia) Nina Vislova	8–21, 21–14, 21–16	(gold) Winner
2010	Dutch Open	(Russia) Valeria Sorokina	(Japan) Shintaro Ikeda (Japan) Reiko Shiota	22–20, 21–9	(gold) Winner
2011	Russian Open	(Russia) Valeria Sorokina	(Japan) Shintaro Ikeda (Japan) Reiko Shiota	21–18, 21–14	(gold) Winner
2012	Russian Open	(Russia) Valeria Sorokina	(Russia) Vitalij Durkin (Russia) Nina Vislova	21–19, 21–17	(gold) Winner

BWF Grand Prix Gold tournament
BWF Grand Prix tournament

=== BWF International Challenge/Series ===
Men's doubles
Year	Tournament	Partner	Opponent	Score	Result
2002	Norwegian International	(Russia) Nikolaj Nikolaenko	(Sweden) Imanuel Hirschfeld (Sweden) Jörgen Olsson	15–9, 15–13	(gold) Winner
2004	Russian International	(Russia) Vitalij Durkin	(Russia) Victor Maljutin (Russia) Alexandr Russkikh	15–12, 15–7	(gold) Winner
2006	Le Volant d'Or de Toulouse	(Russia) Vitalij Durkin	(Belgium) Wouter Claes (Belgium) Frédéric Mawet	14–21, 21–16, 22–20	(gold) Winner
2006	Italian International	(Russia) Vitalij Durkin	(Russia) Evgenij Dremin (Russia) Alexey Vasiliev	21–14, 17–21, 21–16	(gold) Winner
2007	Austrian International	(Russia) Vitalij Durkin	(China) Guo Zhendong (China) He Hanbin	15–21, 21–19, 17–21	(silver) Runner-up
2007	White Nights	(Russia) Vitalij Durkin	(Germany) Jochen Cassel (Germany) Thomas Tesche	21–17, 21–15	(gold) Winner
2007	Scottish International	(Russia) Vitalij Durkin	(England) Robert Blair (England) David Lindley	18–21, 12–21	(silver) Runner-up
2008	White Nights	(Russia) Vitalij Durkin	(Poland) Michał Łogosz (Poland) Robert Mateusiak	6–21, 7–21	(silver) Runner-up
2008	Bulgarian International	(Russia) Vitalij Durkin	(Poland) Adam Cwalina (Poland) Wojciech Szkudlarczyk	21–23, 21–12, 22–20	(gold) Winner
2009	White Nights	(Russia) Vitalij Durkin	(Russia) Vladimir Ivanov (Russia) Ivan Sozonov	21–17, 21–11	(gold) Winner
2009	Welsh International	(Russia) Vitalij Durkin	(Germany) Peter Käsbauer (Germany) Oliver Roth	21–18, 21–18	(gold) Winner
2010	White Nights	(Russia) Vitalij Durkin	(Poland) Adam Cwalina (Poland) Michał Łogosz	19–21, 27–29	(silver) Runner-up
2011	Czech International	(Russia) Vitalij Durkin	(Poland) Adam Cwalina (Poland) Michał Łogosz	13–21, 16–21	(silver) Runner-up
2011	Italian International	(Russia) Vitalij Durkin	(Russia) Vladimir Ivanov (Russia) Ivan Sozonov	16–21, 15–21	(silver) Runner-up
2013	Turkey International	(Russia) Gordey Kosenko	(Russia) Nikita Khakimov (Russia) Vasily Kuznetsov	20–22, 19–21	(silver) Runner-up

Mixed doubles
Year	Tournament	Partner	Opponent	Score	Result
2004	Russian International	(Russia) Valeria Sorokina	(Russia) Vitalij Durkin (Russia) Tatjana Bibik	15–7, 15–13	(gold) Winner
2005	Italian International	(Russia) Valeria Sorokina	(Russia) Vitalij Durkin (Russia) Marina Yakusheva	10–15, 9–15	(silver) Runner-up
2006	Scottish International	(Russia) Nina Vislova	(Russia) Vitalij Durkin (Russia) Valeria Sorokina	20–22, 11–21	(silver) Runner-up
2007	Austrian International	(Russia) Nina Vislova	(Russia) Vitalij Durkin (Russia) Valeria Sorokina	14–21, 20–22	(silver) Runner-up
2007	White Nights	(Russia) Nina Vislova	(Russia) Nikolai Ukk (Russia) Tatjana Bibik	21–17, 21–14	(gold) Winner
2007	Bulgarian International	(Russia) Nina Vislova	(France) Svetoslav Stoyanov (France) Élodie Eymard	21–18, 19–21, 21–15	(gold) Winner
2007	Scottish International	(Russia) Nina Vislova	(England) Robert Blair (Scotland) Imogen Bankier	21–15, 20–22, 9–21	(silver) Runner-up
2007	Italian International	(Russia) Nina Vislova	(Russia) Vitalij Durkin (Russia) Valeria Sorokina	21–15, 18–21, 21–16	(gold) Winner
2008	European Circuit Finals	(Russia) Nina Vislova	(Belgium) Wouter Claes (Belgium) Nathalie Descamps	21–7, 21–19	(gold) Winner
2009	Welsh International	(Russia) Valeria Sorokina	(Russia) Vitalij Durkin (Russia) Nina Vislova	13–21, 13–21	(silver) Runner-up
2009	Scottish Open	(Russia) Valeria Sorokina	(Australia) Raj Veeran (Australia) Renuga Veeran	21–11, 21–16	(gold) Winner
2011	Dutch International	(Russia) Valeria Sorokina	(Denmark) Mikkel Delbo Larsen (Denmark) Mie Schjøtt-Kristensen	13–21, 12–11 retired	(gold) Winner
2011	Czech International	(Russia) Valeria Sorokina	(Estonia) Gert Künka (Sweden) Amanda Högström	21–15, 21–12	(gold) Winner
2011	Italian International	(Russia) Valeria Sorokina	(Russia) Vitalij Durkin (Russia) Nina Vislova	13–21, 21–18, 21–17	(gold) Winner

BWF International Challenge tournament
BWF International Series tournament
BWF Future Series tournament

== Record against selected opponents ==
Mixed doubles results with Valeria Sorokina against Super Series finalists, Worlds Championships semi-finalists, and Olympic quarter-finalists.

- (China) Tao Jiaming & Tian Qing 0–1
- (China) Zhang Nan & Zhao Yunlei 0–3
- (China) Xu Chen & Ma Jin 0–3
- (Chinese Taipei) Lee Sheng-mu & Chien Yu-chin 0–1
- (Denmark) Joachim Fischer Nielsen & Christinna Pedersen 0–1
- (Denmark) Thomas Laybourn & Kamilla Rytter Juhl 2–2
- (Germany) Michael Fuchs & Birgit Michels 2–1
- (United Kingdom) Chris Adcock & Imogen Bankier 1–0
- (Indonesia) Fran Kurniawan & Pia Zebadiah Bernadet 0–1
- (South Korea) Lee Yong-dae & Ha Jung-eun 0–1
- (South Korea) Yoo Yeon-seong & Jang Ye-na 0–1
- (Malaysia) Chan Peng Soon & Goh Liu Ying 1–0
- (Poland) Robert Mateusiak & Nadieżda Zięba 1–2
- (Russia) Vitalij Durkin & Nina Vislova 5–2
- (Scotland) / (England) Robert Blair & Gabrielle White 0–1
- (Thailand) Songphon Anugritayawon & Kunchala Voravichitchaikul 1–0
- (Thailand) Sudket Prapakamol & Saralee Thungthongkam 2–1
