= Vitalij Durkin =

Russian badminton player (born 1979)

Personal information
- Born: Vitalij Valerievich Durkin (Виталий Валерьевич Дуркин); 2 September 1979 (age 47) Novosibirsk, Russian SFSR, Soviet Union
- Height: 1.76 m (5 ft 9 in)
- Weight: 66 kg (146 lb)

Sport
- Country: Russia
- Sport: Badminton
- Coached by: Tatiana Zvereva

Men's & mixed doubles
- Highest ranking: 27 (MD with Aleksandr Nikolaenko, 18 March 2010); 16 (XD with Nina Vislova, 18 March 2010)
- BWF profile
Medal record
Men's badminton
Representing Russia
European Mixed Team Championships
Bronze medal – third place	2015 Leuven	Mixed team

Vitalij Valerievich Durkin (Russian: Виталий Валерьевич Дуркин; born 2 September 1979) is a Russian badminton player with a master of sports of international class. Throughout his prolific career, which began at the age of seven, he established himself as one of Russia's most successful doubles specialists, securing eight national titles and earning a bronze medal at the European Mixed Team Championships. Durkin achieved significant international success alongside partners like Nina Vislova and Aleksandr Nikolaenko, clinching titles at the Russian, Vietnam, and the Scottish Open Grand Prix. He has transitioned into a coaching role, serving as the head coach at the Khimki club, where he utilizes his thirty-plus years of professional experience to mentor the next generation of Russian athletes.

== Career ==
In 2015, Durkin competed at the European Games in Baku, Azerbaijan.

== Achievements ==
=== BWF Grand Prix ===
The BWF Grand Prix had two levels, the Grand Prix and Grand Prix Gold. It was a series of badminton tournaments sanctioned by the Badminton World Federation (BWF) and played between 2007 and 2017. The World Badminton Grand Prix was sanctioned by the International Badminton Federation from 1983 to 2006.

Men's doubles
Year	Tournament	Partner	Opponent	Score	Result
2006	U.S. Open	(Russia) Aleksandr Nikolaenko	(United States) Tony Gunawan (United States) Halim Haryanto	10–21, 19–21	(silver) Runner-up
2008	Russian Open	(Russia) Aleksandr Nikolaenko	(Russia) Vladimir Ivanov (Russia) Ivan Sozonov	21–11, 21–15	(gold) Winner
2009	Russian Open	(Russia) Aleksandr Nikolaenko	(Russia) Vladimir Ivanov (Russia) Ivan Sozonov	19–21, 19–21	(silver) Runner-up
2010	Russian Open	(Russia) Aleksandr Nikolaenko	(Russia) Vladimir Ivanov (Russia) Ivan Sozonov	17–21, 21–10, 18–21	(silver) Runner-up
2012	Russian Open	(Russia) Aleksandr Nikolaenko	(Russia) Vladimir Ivanov (Russia) Ivan Sozonov	18–21, 15–21	(silver) Runner-up
2013	Russian Open	(Russia) Andrey Ashmarin	(Russia) Vladimir Ivanov (Russia) Ivan Sozonov	16–21, 19–21	(silver) Runner-up

Mixed doubles
Year	Tournament	Partner	Opponent	Score	Result
2006	U.S. Open	(Russia) Valeria Sorokina	(Russia) Sergey Ivlev (Russia) Nina Vislova	21–15, 15–21, 21–16	(silver) Runner-up
2008	Russian Open	(Russia) Nina Vislova	(Russia) Aleksandr Nikolaenko (Russia) Valeria Sorokina	19–21, 19–21	(silver) Runner-up
2009	Russian Open	(Russia) Nina Vislova	(Russia) Aleksandr Nikolaenko (Russia) Valeria Sorokina	21–16, 21–16	(gold) Winner
2009	Dutch Open	(Russia) Nina Vislova	(Russia) Aleksandr Nikolaenko (Russia) Valeria Sorokina	21–13, 16–21, 12–21	(silver) Runner-up
2010	Russian Open	(Russia) Nina Vislova	(Russia) Aleksandr Nikolaenko (Russia) Valeria Sorokina	21–8, 14–21, 16–21	(silver) Runner-up
2011	Vietnam Open	(Russia) Nina Vislova	(South Korea) Chung Eui-seok (South Korea) Yoo Hyun-young	21–16, 21–13	(gold) Winner
2012	Russian Open	(Russia) Nina Vislova	(Russia) Aleksandr Nikolaenko (Russia) Valeria Sorokina	19–21, 17–21	(silver) Runner-up
2013	Russian Open	(Russia) Nina Vislova	(Russia) Ivan Sozonov (Russia) Tatjana Bibik	17–21, 22–24	(silver) Runner-up
2015	Scottish Open	(Russia) Nina Vislova	(France) Ronan Labar (France) Émilie Lefel	21–14, 21–12	(gold) Winner

BWF Grand Prix Gold tournament
BWF Grand Prix tournament

=== BWF International Challenge/Series ===
Men's doubles
Year	Tournament	Partner	Opponent	Score	Result
2000	Russian International	(Russia) Alexandr Russkikh	(Russia) Mikhail Kelj (Russia) Victor Maljutin		(silver) Runner-up
2004	Russian International	(Russia) Aleksandr Nikolaenko	(Russia) Victor Maljutin (Russia) Alexandr Russkikh	15–12, 15–7	(gold) Winner
2006	Le Volant d'Or de Toulouse	(Russia) Aleksandr Nikolaenko	(Belgium) Wouter Claes (Belgium) Frédéric Mawet	14–21, 21–16, 22–20	(gold) Winner
2006	Italian International	(Russia) Aleksandr Nikolaenko	(Russia) Evgenij Dremin (Russia) Alexey Vasiliev	21–14, 17–21, 21–16	(gold) Winner
2007	Austrian International	(Russia) Aleksandr Nikolaenko	(China) Guo Zhendong (China) He Hanbin	15–21, 21–19, 17–21	(silver) Runner-up
2007	White Nights	(Russia) Aleksandr Nikolaenko	(Germany) Jochen Cassel (Germany) Thomas Tesche	21–17, 21–15	(gold) Winner
2007	Scottish International	(Russia) Aleksandr Nikolaenko	(England) Robert Blair (England) David Lindley	18–21, 12–21	(silver) Runner-up
2008	White Nights	(Russia) Aleksandr Nikolaenko	(Poland) Michał Łogosz (Poland) Robert Mateusiak	6–21, 7–21	(silver) Runner-up
2008	Bulgarian International	(Russia) Aleksandr Nikolaenko	(Poland) Adam Cwalina (Poland) Wojciech Szkudlarczyk	21–23, 21–12, 22–20	(gold) Winner
2009	White Nights	(Russia) Aleksandr Nikolaenko	(Russia) Vladimir Ivanov (Russia) Ivan Sozonov	21–17, 21–11	(gold) Winner
2009	Welsh International	(Russia) Aleksandr Nikolaenko	(Germany) Peter Käsbauer (Germany) Oliver Roth	21–18, 21–18	(gold) Winner
2010	White Nights	(Russia) Aleksandr Nikolaenko	(Poland) Adam Cwalina (Poland) Michał Łogosz	19–21, 27–29	(silver) Runner-up
2011	Czech International	(Russia) Aleksandr Nikolaenko	(Poland) Adam Cwalina (Poland) Michał Łogosz	13–21, 16–21	(silver) Runner-up
2011	Italian International	(Russia) Aleksandr Nikolaenko	(Russia) Vladimir Ivanov (Russia) Ivan Sozonov	16–21, 15–21	(silver) Runner-up
2018	Italian International	(Russia) Nikolai Ukk	(Denmark) Mathias Bay-Smidt (Denmark) Lasse Mølhede	11–21, 11–21	(silver) Runner-up
2019	White Nights	(Russia) Nikolai Ukk	(Russia) Nikita Khakimov (Russia) Alexandr Zinchenko	20–22, 16–21	(silver) Runner-up

Mixed doubles
Year	Tournament	Partner	Opponent	Score	Result
2004	Russian International	(Russia) Tatjana Bibik	(Russia) Aleksandr Nikolaenko (Russia) Valeria Sorokina	7–15, 13–15	(silver) Runner-up
2005	Italian International	(Russia) Marina Yakusheva	(Russia) Aleksandr Nikolaenko (Russia) Valeria Sorokina	15–10, 15–9	(gold) Winner
2006	Le Volant d'Or de Toulouse	(Russia) Marina Yakusheva	(Russia) Alexandr Russkikh (Russia) Anastasia Russkikh	19–21, 18–21	(silver) Runner-up
2006	Italian International	(Russia) Valeria Sorokina	(Denmark) Peter Steffensen (Denmark) Mette Schjoldager	20–22, 12–21	(silver) Runner-up
2006	Belgian International	(Russia) Valeria Sorokina	(France) Svetoslav Stoyanov (France) Élodie Eymard	21–14, 21–13	(gold) Winner
2006	Polish International	(Russia) Valeria Sorokina	(Poland) Robert Mateusiak (Poland) Nadieżda Kostiuczyk	4–21, 21–9, 13–21	(silver) Runner-up
2006	Scottish International	(Russia) Valeria Sorokina	(Russia) Aleksandr Nikolaenko (Russia) Nina Vislova	22–20, 21–11	(gold) Winner
2007	Austrian International	(Russia) Valeria Sorokina	(Russia) Aleksandr Nikolaenko (Russia) Nina Vislova	21–14, 22–20	(gold) Winner
2007	Norwegian International	(Russia) Valeria Sorokina	(Germany) Kristof Hopp (Germany) Birgit Overzier	15–21, 21–13, 15–21	(silver) Runner-up
2007	Italian International	(Russia) Valeria Sorokina	(Russia) Aleksandr Nikolaenko (Russia) Nina Vislova	15–21, 21–18, 16–21	(silver) Runner-up
2008	White Nights	(Russia) Nina Vislova	(Poland) Robert Mateusiak (Poland) Nadieżda Kostiuczyk	21–18, 21–14	(gold) Winner
2008	Belgian International	(Russia) Nina Vislova	(Scotland) Watson Briggs (Scotland) Jillie Cooper	21–13, 21–9	(gold) Winner
2008	Bulgarian International	(Russia) Nina Vislova	(Ukraine) Valeriy Atrashchenkov (Ukraine) Elena Prus	21–16, 21–10	(gold) Winner
2008	Hungarian International	(Russia) Nina Vislova	(Russia) Ivan Sozonov (Russia) Anastasia Prokopenko	21–11, 21–19	(gold) Winner
2008	Italian International	(Russia) Nina Vislova	(Germany) Johannes Schöttler (Germany) Birgit Overzier	20–22, 21–19, 21–18	(gold) Winner
2009	Finnish International	(Russia) Nina Vislova	(England) Robin Middleton (Scotland) Imogen Bankier	21–18, 21–13	(gold) Winner
2009	European Circuit Finals	(Russia) Nina Vislova	(Ukraine) Valeriy Atrashchenkov (Ukraine) Elena Prus	21–18, 21–16	(gold) Winner
2009	White Nights	(Russia) Nina Vislova	(Indonesia) Flandy Limpele (Russia) Anastasia Russkikh	14–21, 23–25	(silver) Runner-up
2009	Welsh International	(Russia) Nina Vislova	(Russia) Aleksandr Nikolaenko (Russia) Valeria Sorokina	21–13, 21–13	(gold) Winner
2011	Swiss International	(Russia) Nina Vislova	(Russia) Sergey Lunev (Russia) Evgenia Dimova	22–20, 25–23	(gold) Winner
2011	Italian International	(Russia) Nina Vislova	(Russia) Aleksandr Nikolaenko (Russia) Valeria Sorokina	21–13, 18–21, 17–21	(silver) Runner-up
2013	Swiss International	(Russia) Nina Vislova	(France) Ronan Labar (France) Émilie Lefel	21–14, 17–21, 21–18	(gold) Winner
2013	Welsh International	(Russia) Nina Vislova	(England) Chris Langridge (England) Heather Olver	17–21, 21–10, 13–21	(silver) Runner-up
2014	Estonian International	(Russia) Nina Vislova	(Russia) Anatoliy Yartsev (Russia) Evgeniya Kosetskaya	24–22, 14–21, 21–16	(gold) Winner
2014	Polish Open	(Russia) Nina Vislova	(Poland) Robert Mateusiak (Poland) Agnieszka Wojtkowska	21–15, 16–7 retired	(gold) Winner
2014	Swiss International	(Russia) Nina Vislova	(France) Ronan Labar (France) Émilie Lefel	9–11, 7–11, 9–11	(silver) Runner-up
2014	Bahrain International Challenge	(Russia) Nina Vislova	(Indonesia) Fran Kurniawan (Indonesia) Komala Dewi	21–8, 21–10	(gold) Winner
2015	Swedish Masters	(Russia) Nina Vislova	(Netherlands) Jacco Arends (Netherlands) Selena Piek	17–21, 21–17, 14–21	(silver) Runner-up
2015	Czech Open	(Russia) Nina Vislova	(Germany) Michael Fuchs (Germany) Birgit Michels	21–18, 21–19	(gold) Winner
2016	Peru International	(Russia) Nina Vislova	(Russia) Evgenij Dremin (Russia) Evgenia Dimova	25–23, 21–14	(gold) Winner
2016	Tahiti International	(Russia) Nina Vislova	(United States) Phillip Chew (United States) Jamie Subandhi	21–18, 16–21, 21–8	(gold) Winner
2016	White Nights	(Russia) Nina Vislova	(Germany) Michael Fuchs (Germany) Birgit Michels	9–21, 12–21	(silver) Runner-up

BWF International Challenge tournament
BWF International Series tournament
