= Vladimir Malkov (badminton) =

Russian badminton player

Personal information
- Born: Vladimir Vadimovich Malkov (Владимир Вадимович Мальков); 9 April 1986 (age 40) Saratov, Russian SFSR, Soviet Union
- Height: 1.87 m (6 ft 2 in)
- Weight: 70 kg (154 lb)

Sport
- Country: Russia
- Sport: Badminton
- Handedness: Right
- Coached by: Inna Zubova; Klavdia Maiorova

Men's singles & doubles
- Highest ranking: 41 (MS 13 August 2015); 127 (MD 31 October 2013); 193 (XD 21 January 2010)
- BWF profile
Medal record
Men's badminton
Representing Russia
European Mixed Team Championships
Silver medal – second place	2017 Lubin	Mixed team
Bronze medal – third place	2015 Leuven	Mixed team
Bronze medal – third place	2019 Copenhagen	Mixed team
Bronze medal – third place	2021 Vantaa	Mixed team
European Men's Team Championships
Bronze medal – third place	2020 Liévin	Men's team
European Junior Championships
Silver medal – second place	2005 Den Bosch	Mixed team
Bronze medal – third place	2005 Den Bosch	Mixed doubles

Vladimir Vadimovich Malkov (Russian: Влади́мир Вадимович Малько́в; born 9 April 1986) is a Russian badminton player. He won the Russian National Championships in 2009, 2013–2016. Malkov competed at the 2016 Summer Olympics in Rio de Janeiro, Brazil.

== Achievements ==
=== BWF Grand Prix (1 title, 3 runners-up) ===
The BWF Grand Prix had two levels, the Grand Prix and Grand Prix Gold. It was a series of badminton tournaments sanctioned by the Badminton World Federation (BWF) and played between 2007 and 2017.

Men's singles
Year	Tournament	Opponent	Score	Result
2009	Russian Open	(France) Brice Leverdez	21–17, 11–21, 21–8	(gold) Winner
2012	Russian Open	(Japan) Kazumasa Sakai	17–21, 17–21	(silver) Runner-up
2017	Russian Open	(Russia) Sergey Sirant	11–13, 5–11, 11–6, 11–7, 4–11	(silver) Runner-up

Men's doubles
Year	Tournament	Partner	Opponent	Score	Result
2005	Russian Open	(Russia) Konstantin Khlestov	(Russia) Nikolaj Nikolaenko (Russia) Alexey Vasiliev	5–15, 6–15	(silver) Runner-up

BWF Grand Prix Gold tournament
BWF Grand Prix tournament

=== BWF International Challenge/Series (11 titles, 5 runners-up) ===
Men's singles
Year	Tournament	Opponent	Score	Result
2008	Kharkiv International	(Ukraine) Dmytro Zavadsky	14–21, 16–21	(silver) Runner-up
2010	Croatian International	(England) Ben Beckman	21–15, 16–21, 10–21	(silver) Runner-up
2011	Kenya International	(Peru) Rodrigo Pacheco	20–22, 25–23, 21–11	(gold) Winner
2012	Hungarian International	(France) Inoki Theopilus	21–9, 21–10	(gold) Winner
2013	Polish Open	(Chinese Taipei) Hsu Jen-hao	21–12, 20–22, 21–18	(gold) Winner
2013	Swiss International	(France) Brice Leverdez	20–22, 14–21	(silver) Runner-up
2013	Hatzor International	(Israel) Misha Zilberman	17–21, 24–22, 21–10	(gold) Winner
2014	Orleans International	(Spain) Pablo Abián	16–21, 21–19, 20–22	(silver) Runner-up
2015	Finnish Open	(Finland) Eetu Heino	21–18, 21–12	(gold) Winner
2015	White Nights	(Vietnam) Nguyễn Tiến Minh	21–16, 21–12	(gold) Winner
2015	Kazakhstan International	(Russia) Anatoliy Yartsev	21–18, 21–16	(gold) Winner
2015	Welsh International	(Poland) Adrian Dziółko	21–13, 21–17	(gold) Winner
2018	Dubai International	(India) Subhankar Dey	21–10, 21–15	(gold) Winner

Men's doubles
Year	Tournament	Partner	Opponent	Score	Result
2008	Kharkiv International	(Russia) Gordey Kosenko	(Ukraine) Vitaly Konov (Ukraine) Dmytro Zavadsky	Walkover	(silver) Runner-up
2013	Hatzor International	(Russia) Vadim Novoselov	(Wales) Joe Morgan (Wales) Nic Strange	21–18, 19–21, 27–25	(gold) Winner

Mixed doubles
Year	Tournament	Partner	Opponent	Score	Result
2013	Hatzor International	(Russia) Viktoriia Vorobeva	(Czech Republic) Jan Fröhlich (Russia) Katerina Zvereva	21–13, 21–12	(gold) Winner

BWF International Challenge tournament
BWF International Series tournament
