= Phạm Hồng Nam =

Vietnamese badminton player (born 1996)

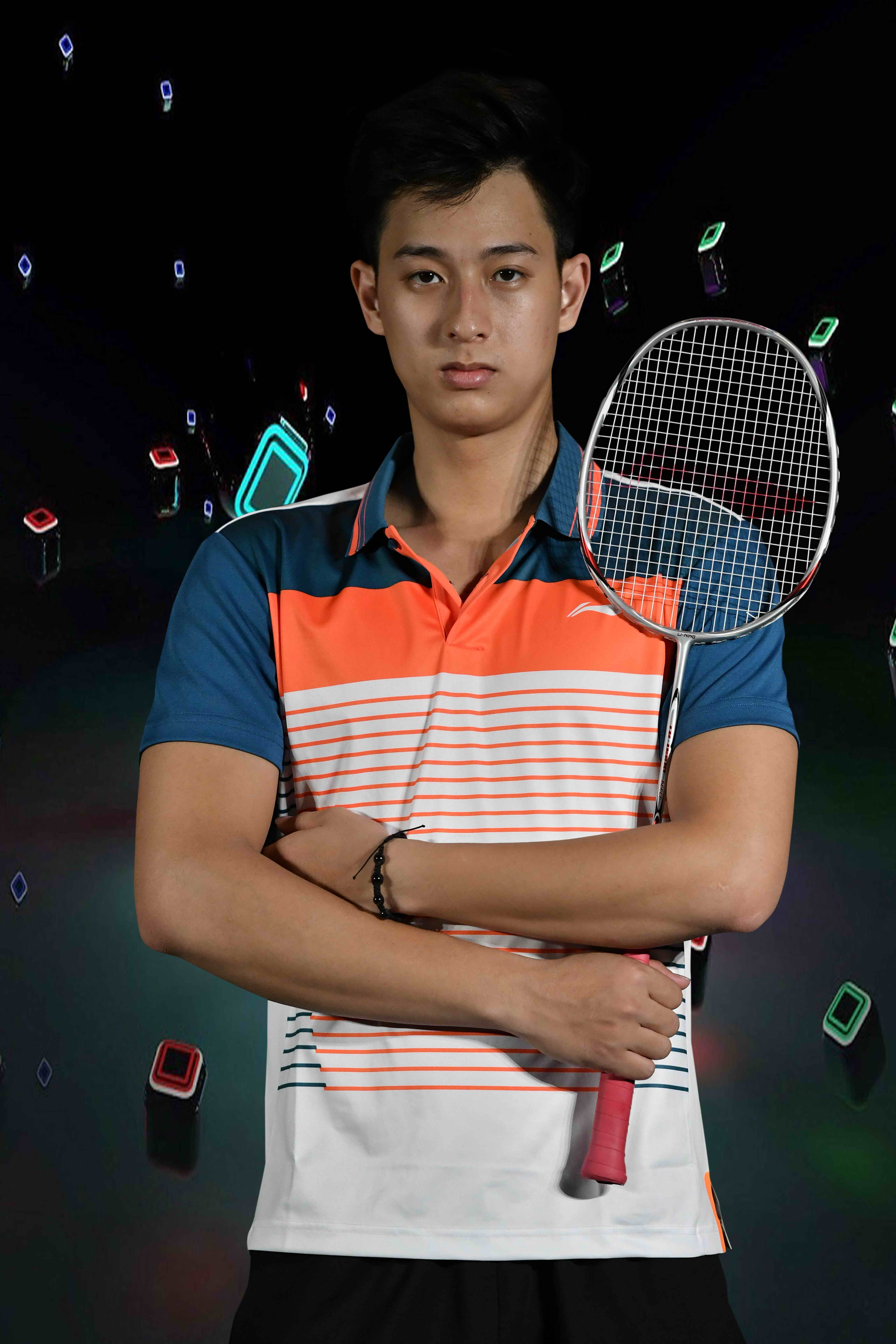

Personal information
- Born: 7 April 1996 (age 30) Hanoi, Vietnam
- Height: 1.83 m (6 ft 0 in)

Sport
- Country: Vietnam
- Sport: Badminton

Men's & mixed doubles
- Highest ranking: 70 (MD 28 September 2017); 98 (XD 18 August 2016)
- BWF profile
Medal record
Men's badminton
Representing Vietnam
SEA Games
Bronze medal – third place	2021 Vietnam	Men's doubles

Phạm Hồng Nam (born 7 April 1996) is a Vietnamese badminton player, specializing in doubles play. He was the champion at the 2016 Vietnam International Series in the men's doubles with his partner Đỗ Tuấn Đức.

== Career ==
He and his partner Đỗ Tuấn Đức competed at the 2021 SEA Games and won a bronze medal after a semi-final battle against Leo Rolly Carnando and Daniel Marthin of Indonesia.

== Achievements ==
=== SEA Games ===
Men's doubles
Year	Venue	Partner	Opponent	Score	Result
2021	Bac Giang Gymnasium; Bắc Giang, Vietnam	(Vietnam) Đỗ Tuấn Đức	(Indonesia) Leo Rolly Carnando (Indonesia) Daniel Marthin	20–22, 16–21	Bronze

=== BWF International Challenge/Series (1 title, 2 runners-up) ===
Men's doubles
Year	Tournament	Partner	Opponent	Score	Result
2013	Hellas International	(Vietnam) Đỗ Tuấn Đức	(Russia) Nikolaj Nikolaenko (Russia) Nikolai Ukk	14–21, 16–21	(silver) Runner-up
2016	Portugal International	(Vietnam) Đỗ Tuấn Đức	(Malaysia) Ong Yew Sin (Malaysia) Teo Ee Yi	17–21, 22–24	(silver) Runner-up
2016	Vietnam International Series	(Vietnam) Đỗ Tuấn Đức	(Malaysia) Goh Sze Fei (Malaysia) Nur Izzuddin	17–21, 21–19, 22–20	(gold) Winner

Commonwealth Youth Games tournament
BWF International Series tournament
BWF Future Series tournament
