= Italian Open (badminton) =

Badminton championships

The Italian International or Italian Open (badminton) in badminton is an international open held in Italy since 1994. It was halted between 1996 and 1998, and in 2000. The tournament belongs to BWF's European Badminton Circuit (a continental circuit), it is graded as a BWF International Series.

== Previous winners ==
Year	Men's singles	Women's singles	Men's doubles	Women's doubles	Mixed doubles	Ref
1994	(Syria) Rashad Khankan	(Italy) Wang Yuyu	(Bulgaria) Tzvetozar Kolev (Bulgaria) Slantchezar Tzankov	(Italy) Barbara Faiazza (Italy) Wang Yuyu	No competition	
1995	(China) Shen Yifeng	(Italy) Wang Yuyu	(Bulgaria) Tzvetozar Kolev (Bulgaria) Plamen Peev	(Hungary) Andrea Dakó (Hungary) Adrienn Kocsis	(China) Zhou You (Italy) Wang Yuyu	
1996– 1998	No competition					
1999	(Switzerland) Salim	(China) Zeng Yaqiong	(England) Anthony Clark (England) Ian Sullivan	(Japan) Naomi Murakami (Japan) Hiromi Yamada	(England) Ian Sullivan (China) Han Jingna	
2000	No competition					
2001	(Italy) Ying Liyong	(Italy) Agnese Allegrini	(Germany) Arnd Vetters (Germany) Franklin Wahab	(Germany) Kathrin Hoffmann (Germany) Jessica Willems	(Germany) Franklin Wahab (Germany) Jessica Willems	
2002	(Germany) Jens Roch	(Russia) Maria Kazakova	(Spain) Nicolás Escartín (Spain) Arturo Ruiz López	(Austria) Verena Fastenbauer (Austria) Simone Prutsch	(Moldova) Maxim Carpenco (Israel) Evelin Gridenberg	
2003	(Netherlands) Gerben Bruijstens	(Italy) Agnese Allegrini	(Germany) Agus Sugimin (Germany) Inoki Theopilus	(Italy) Agnese Allegrini (Italy) Federica Panini	(Denmark) Jesper Hovgaard (Denmark) Karina Sørensen	
2004	(Denmark) Daniel Damgaard	(Slovenia) Maja Tvrdy	(Denmark) Daniel Damgaard (Denmark) Christoffer B. Jensen	(Denmark) Line Isberg (Denmark) Mia Nielsen	(Denmark) Jesper Hovgaard (Denmark) Line Isberg	
2005	(Denmark) Joachim Persson	(Denmark) Tine Rasmussen	(Denmark) Anders Kristiansen (Denmark) Simon Mollyhus	(Russia) Valeria Sorokina (Russia) Nina Vislova	(Russia) Vitalij Durkin (Russia) Marina Yakusheva	
2006	(Denmark) Jens-Kristian Leth	(Sweden) Sara Persson	(Russia) Vitalij Durkin (Russia) Aleksandr Nikolaenko	(China) Cai Jiani (China) Yu Qi	(Denmark) Peter Steffensen (Denmark) Mette Schjoldager	
2007	(Japan) Sho Sasaki	(Germany) Juliane Schenk	(Denmark) Mathias Boe (Denmark) Carsten Mogensen	(Russia) Ekaterina Ananina (Russia) Anastasia Russkikh	(Russia) Aleksandr Nikolaenko (Russia) Nina Vislova	
2008	(Malaysia) Wong Choong Hann	(Germany) Juliane Schenk	(Germany) Kristof Hopp (Germany) Johannes Schöttler	(Russia) Valeria Sorokina (Russia) Nina Vislova	(Russia) Vitalij Durkin (Russia) Nina Vislova	
2009	No competition					
2010	(Poland) Przemysław Wacha	(Germany) Olga Konon	(England) Anthony Clark (England) Chris Langridge	(Netherlands) Selena Piek (Netherlands) Iris Tabeling	(England) Chris Adcock (Scotland) Imogen Bankier	
2011	(Spain) Pablo Abián	(Netherlands) Yao Jie	(Russia) Vladimir Ivanov (Russia) Ivan Sozonov	(Russia) Valeria Sorokina (Russia) Nina Vislova	(Russia) Aleksandr Nikolaenko (Russia) Valeria Sorokina	
2012	No competition					
2013	(Italy) Indra Bagus Ade Chandra	(Spain) Carolina Marín	(Poland) Adam Cwalina (Poland) Przemysław Wacha	(Netherlands) Eefje Muskens (Netherlands) Selena Piek	(Croatia) Zvonimir Đurkinjak (United States) Eva Lee	
2014	(Indonesia) Andre Kurniawan Tedjono	(France) Sashina Vignes Waran	(England) Marcus Ellis (England) Chris Langridge	(Netherlands) Samantha Barning (Netherlands) Iris Tabeling	(France) Ronan Labar (France) Émilie Lefel	
2015	(France) Brice Leverdez	(Denmark) Natalia Koch Rohde	(Denmark) Kasper Antonsen (Denmark) Niclas Nøhr	(Bulgaria) Gabriela Stoeva (Bulgaria) Stefani Stoeva	(Denmark) Niclas Nøhr (Denmark) Sara Thygesen	
2016	(Sweden) Henri Hurskainen	(Switzerland) Sabrina Jaquet	(Germany) Jones Ralfy Jansen (Germany) Josche Zurwonne	(Russia) Anastasia Chervyakova (Russia) Olga Morozova	(France) Jordan Corvée (France) Anne Tran	
2017	(Spain) Pablo Abián	(Vietnam) Nguyễn Thùy Linh	(Netherlands) Jelle Maas (Netherlands) Robin Tabeling	(Russia) Ekaterina Bolotova (Russia) Alina Davletova	(England) Ben Lane (England) Jessica Pugh	
2018	(Denmark) Victor Svendsen	(Denmark) Julie Dawall Jakobsen	(Denmark) Mathias Bay-Smidt (Denmark) Lasse Mølhede	(Russia) Ekaterina Bolotova (Russia) Alina Davletova	(Russia) Evgenij Dremin (Russia) Evgenia Dimova	
2019	(France) Christo Popov	(Spain) Carolina Marín	(Germany) Bjarne Geiss (Germany) Jan Colin Völker	(Bulgaria) Gabriela Stoeva (Bulgaria) Stefani Stoeva	(Russia) Vladimir Ivanov (Russia) Ekaterina Bolotova	
2020	Cancelled (Note: This tournament, originally to be played from 3 to 6 December, was later cancelled due to the COVID-19 pandemic in Italy.)					
2021	(France) Alex Lanier	(Sweden) Edith Urell	(Denmark) Kristian Kræmer (Denmark) Marcus Rindshøj	(Germany) Stine Küspert (Germany) Emma Moszczynski	(Denmark) Jesper Toft (Denmark) Clara Graversen	
2022	(Indonesia) Christian Adinata	(Chinese Taipei) Hsu Wen-chi	(South Korea) Kim Jae-hwan (South Korea) Yoon Dae-il	(Chinese Taipei) Hsu Ya-ching (Chinese Taipei) Lin Wan-ching	(Indonesia) Zachariah Josiahno Sumanti (Indonesia) Hediana Julimarbela	
2023	Cancelled (Note: This tournament, originally to be played on 1–4 June, was later cancelled.)					
2024	No competition					
2025	(Denmark) Ditlev Jæger Holm	(Turkey) Özge Bayrak	(Spain) Daniel Franco (Spain) Rodrigo Sanjurjo	(Bulgaria) Gabriela Stoeva (Bulgaria) Stefani Stoeva	(France) Thibault Gardon (France) Kathell Desmots-Chacun	
2026	(Denmark) Karan Rajan	(United Arab Emirates) Prakriti Bharath	(Germany) Danial Marzuan (Germany) Aaron Sonnenschein	(England) Lisa Curtin (England) Yulia Tang	(Germany) Jan Colin Völker (Germany) Emma Moszczynski	

== Performances by nation ==
As of the 2026 edition

	Nation	MS	WS	MD	WD	XD	Total
1	Denmark	6	3	6	1	5	21
2	Russia		1	2	7	6	16
3	Germany	1	3	6	2	2	14
4	Italy	2	4		2	0.5	8.5
5	France	3	1			3	7
6	England			3	1	2	6
6	Netherlands	1	1	1	3		6
6	Spain	2	2	2			6
9	Bulgaria			2	3		5
10	China	1	1		1	1	4
11	Indonesia	2				1	3
11	Sweden	1	2				3
13	Chinese Taipei		1		1		2
13	Japan	1			1		2
13	Poland	1		1			2
13	Switzerland	1	1				2
17	Austria				1		1
17	Hungary				1		1
17	Malaysia	1					1
17	Slovenia		1				1
17	South Korea			1			1
17	Syria	1					1
17	Turkey		1				1
17	United Arab Emirates	1					1
17	Vietnam		1				1
26	Croatia					0.5	0.5
26	Israel					0.5	0.5
26	Moldova					0.5	0.5
26	Scotland					0.5	0.5
26	United States					0.5	0.5
	Total	24	24	24	24	23	119
