= Russian Open (badminton) =

International badminton tournament

The Russian Open in badminton was an international open held in Russia since 1993. This tournament is the continuation of the USSR International. In 2007 it became a BWF Grand Prix Gold.

After the 2022 Russian invasion of Ukraine, the Badminton World Federation (BWF) cancelled all BWF tournaments in Russia.

== Host cities ==
City	Years host
Moscow	2007–2008
Vladivostok	2009–2019

Locations of Russian Open host cities

== Previous winners ==
Year	Men's singles	Women's singles	Men's doubles	Women's doubles	Mixed doubles
1992	(Russia) Andrei Antropov	(Russia) Marina Yakusheva	(Russia) Andrei Antropov (Russia) Nikolai Zuev	(Russia) Marina Andrievskaya (Russia) Marina Yakusheva	(Russia) Nikolai Zuev (Russia) Marina Yakusheva
1993	(Austria) Hannes Fuchs	(Russia) Marina Andrievskaya	(Belarus) Mikhail Korshuk (Belarus) Vitaliy Shmakov	(Russia) Marina Andrievskaya (Russia) Marina Yakusheva	(Russia) Nikolai Zuev (Russia) Marina Andrievskaya
1994	(China) Chen Gang	(China) Xu Li	(Russia) Sergei Melnikov (Russia) Nikolai Zuev	(Russia) Svetlana Alferova (Russia) Marina Yakusheva	(China) Liu Yong (China) Li Qi
1995	(Indonesia) Hendrawan	(Indonesia) Lidya Djaelawijaya	(Denmark) Jon Holst-Christensen (Denmark) Thomas Lund	(China) Chen Ying (China) Peng Xinyong	(Denmark) Jens Eriksen (Denmark) Marlene Thomsen
1996	(China) Sun Jun	(China) Han Jingna	(Russia) Andrei Antropov (Russia) Nikolai Zuev	(Denmark) Helene Kirkegaard (Denmark) Rikke Olsen	(China) Chen Xingdong (China) Peng Xinyong
1997	(Denmark) Poul-Erik Høyer Larsen	(Denmark) Mette Pedersen	(Denmark) Jon Holst-Christensen (Denmark) Michael Sogaard	(Denmark) Helene Kirkegaard (Denmark) Rikke Olsen	(Denmark) Jon Holst-Christensen (Denmark) Ann-Lou Jorgensen
1998– 1999	No competition				
2000	(Ukraine) Vladislav Druzchenko	(Russia) Ella Karachkova	(Russia) Mikhail Kelj (Russia) Victor Maljutin	(Russia) Irina Rusljakova (Russia) Marina Yakusheva	(Russia) Pavel Uvarov (Russia) Irina Rusljakova
2001– 2003	No competition				
2004	(Russia) Stanislav Pukhov	(Russia) Ella Karachkova	(Russia) Vitalij Durkin (Russia) Aleksandr Nikolaenko	(Russia) Irina Rusljakova (Russia) Anastasia Russkikh	(Russia) Aleksandr Nikolaenko (Russia) Valeria Sorokina
2005	(Russia) Stanislav Pukhov	(Russia) Nina Vislova	(Russia) Nikolaj Nikolaenko (Russia) Alexei Vasiliev	(Russia) Valeria Sorokina (Russia) Nina Vislova	(Russia) Sergei Lunev (Russia) Evgeniya Dimova
2006	No competition				
2007	(China) Lü Yi	(China) Wang Yihan	(Germany) Kristof Hopp (Germany) Ingo Kindervater	(China) Du Jing (China) Yu Yang	(Poland) Robert Mateusiak (Poland) Nadieżda Kostiuczyk
2008	(Netherlands) Dicky Palyama	(Russia) Ella Diehl	(Russia) Vitalij Durkin (Russia) Aleksandr Nikolaenko	(Russia) Valeria Sorokina (Russia) Nina Vislova	(Russia) Aleksandr Nikolaenko (Russia) Valeria Sorokina
2009	(Russia) Vladimir Malkov	(Russia) Ella Diehl	(Russia) Vladimir Ivanov (Russia) Ivan Sozonov	(Russia) Valeria Sorokina (Russia) Nina Vislova	(Russia) Vitalij Durkin (Russia) Nina Vislova
2010	(Japan) Takuma Ueda	(Japan) Ayane Kurihara	(Russia) Vladimir Ivanov (Russia) Ivan Sozonov	(Russia) Valeria Sorokina (Russia) Nina Vislova	(Russia) Aleksandr Nikolaenko (Russia) Valeria Sorokina
2011	(China) Zhou Wenlong	(China) Lu Lan	(Japan) Naoki Kawamae (Japan) Shoji Sato	(Russia) Valeria Sorokina (Russia) Nina Vislova	(Russia) Aleksandr Nikolaenko (Russia) Valeria Sorokina
2012	(Japan) Kazumasa Sakai	(Japan) Yui Hashimoto	(Russia) Vladimir Ivanov (Russia) Ivan Sozonov	(Russia) Valeria Sorokina (Russia) Nina Vislova	(Russia) Aleksandr Nikolaenko (Russia) Valeria Sorokina
2013	(Russia) Vladimir Ivanov	(Japan) Aya Ohori	(Russia) Vladimir Ivanov (Russia) Ivan Sozonov	(Russia) Anastasia Chervaykova (Russia) Nina Vislova	(Russia) Ivan Sozonov (Russia) Tatjana Bibik
2014	(Russia) Vladimir Ivanov	(Japan) Aya Ohori	(Japan) Kenta Kazuno (Japan) Kazushi Yamada	(Japan) Yuriko Miki (Japan) Koharu Yonemoto	(Japan) Ryota Taohata (Japan) Misato Aratama
2015	(Indonesia) Tommy Sugiarto	(Czech Republic) Kristína Gavnholt	(Russia) Vladimir Ivanov (Russia) Ivan Sozonov	(Bulgaria) Gabriela Stoeva (Bulgaria) Stefani Stoeva	(Malaysia) Chan Peng Soon (Malaysia) Goh Liu Ying
2016	(Malaysia) Zulfadli Zulkiffli	(India) Gadde Ruthvika Shivani	(Russia) Vladimir Ivanov (Russia) Ivan Sozonov	(Russia) Anastasia Chervyakova (Russia) Olga Morozova	(India) Pranaav Jerry Chopra (India) N. Sikki Reddy
2017	(Russia) Sergey Sirant	(Russia) Evgeniya Kosetskaya	(Russia) Vladimir Ivanov (Russia) Ivan Sozonov	(Japan) Akane Araki (Japan) Aoi Matsuda	(Malaysia) Chan Peng Soon (Malaysia) Cheah Yee See
2018	(India) Sourabh Verma	(Malaysia) Ho Yen Mei	(Malaysia) Mohamad Arif Abdul Latif (Malaysia) Nur Mohd Azriyn Ayub	(Japan) Chisato Hoshi (Japan) Kie Nakanishi	(Russia) Vladimir Ivanov (South Korea) Kim Min-kyung
2019	(Indonesia) Shesar Hiren Rhustavito	(Chinese Taipei) Pai Yu-po	(Denmark) Mathias Boe (Denmark) Mads Conrad-Petersen	(Indonesia) Ni Ketut Mahadewi Istarani (Indonesia) Tania Oktaviani Kusumah	(Indonesia) Adnan Maulana (Indonesia) Mychelle Crhystine Bandaso
2020	Cancelled (Note: This tournament, originally to be played from 7 to 12 July, was later cancelled due to COVID-19 pandemic in Russia.)				
2021	Cancelled (Note: This tournament, originally to be played between 20 and 25 July, was later cancelled due to the COVID-19 pandemic in Russia.)				

== Performances by nation ==
Pos	Nation	MS	WS	MD	WD	XD	Total
1	Russia	7	8	14	13	11.5	53.5
2	Japan	2	4	2	3	1	12
2	China	4	4		2	2	12
4	Denmark	1	1	3	2	2	9
5	Indonesia	3	1		1	1	6
6	Malaysia	1	1	1		2	5
7	India	1	1			1	3
8	Austria	1					1
8	Belarus			1			1
8	Bulgaria				1		1
8	Chinese Taipei		1				1
8	Czech Republic		1				1
8	Germany			1			1
8	Netherlands	1					1
8	Poland					1	1
8	Ukraine	1					1
17	South Korea					0.5	0.5
Total		22	22	22	22	22	110
