= Ivan Sozonov =

Russian badminton player (born 1989)

Ivan Sozonov Иван Созонов
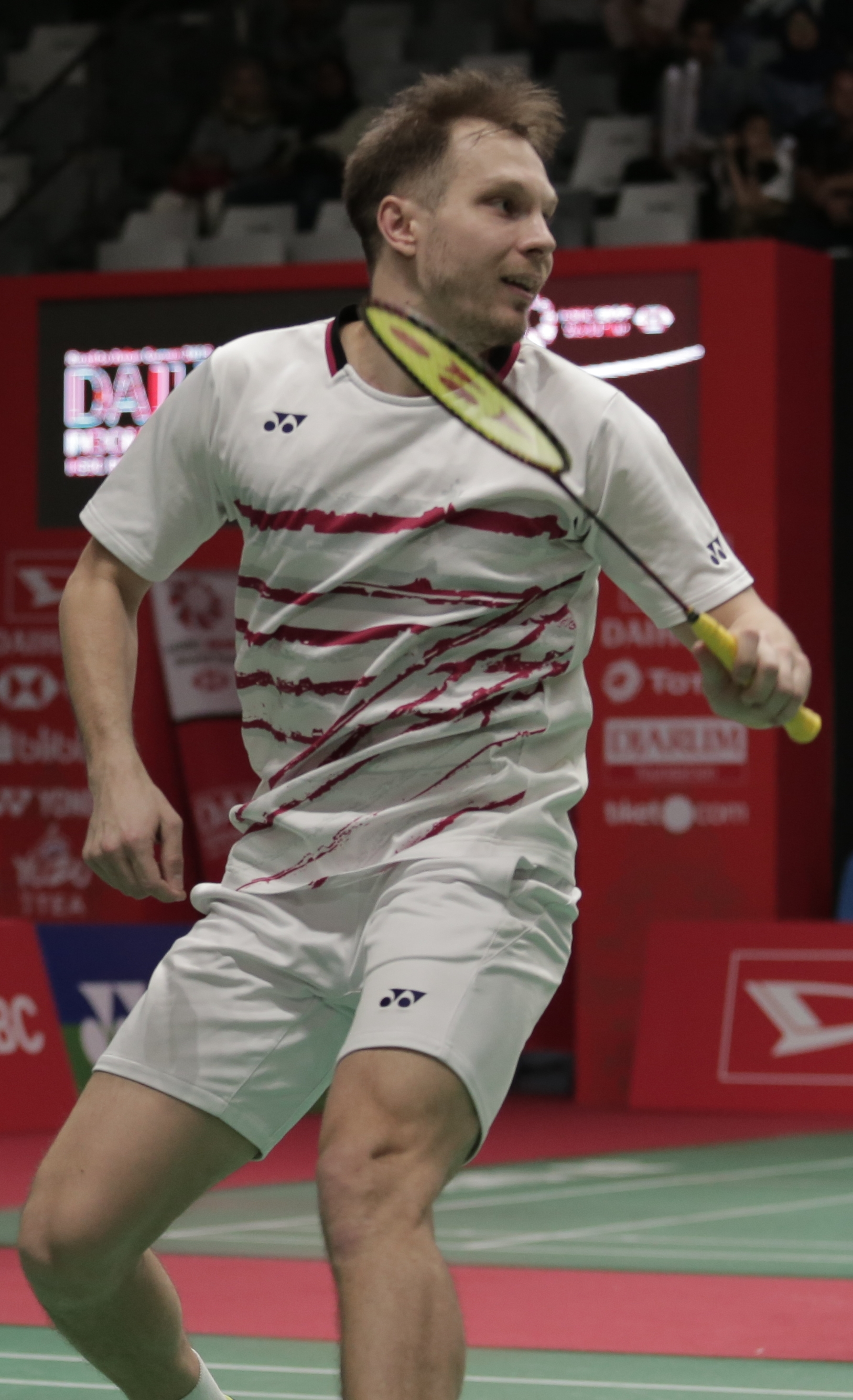

Personal information
- Born: Иван Андреевич Созонов (Ivan Andreyevich Sozonov); 6 July 1989 (age 37) Sverdlovsk, Russian SFSR, Soviet Union
- Height: 1.84 m (6 ft 0 in)
- Weight: 78 kg (172 lb)

Sport
- Country: Russia
- Sport: Badminton
- Handedness: Left

Men's singles & doubles
- Highest ranking: 7 (MD with Vladimir Ivanov, 7 December 2017)
- BWF profile
Medal record
Men's badminton
Representing Russia
European Games
Silver medal – second place	2015 Baku	Men's doubles
Bronze medal – third place	2019 Minsk	Men's doubles
European Championships
Gold medal – first place	2014 Kazan	Men's doubles
Gold medal – first place	2021 Kyiv	Men's doubles
Bronze medal – third place	2016 La Roche-sur-Yon	Men's doubles
Bronze medal – third place	2018 Huelva	Men's doubles
European Mixed Team Championships
Silver medal – second place	2017 Lubin	Mixed team
Bronze medal – third place	2015 Leuven	Mixed team
Bronze medal – third place	2021 Vantaa	Mixed team
European Men's Team Championships
Bronze medal – third place	2020 Liévin	Men's team
Summer Universiade
Silver medal – second place	2013 Kazan	Men's doubles

Ivan Andreyevich Sozonov (Russian: Иван Андреевич Созонов; born 6 July 1989) is a Russian badminton player. He competed for Russia at the 2012, 2016, and 2020 Summer Olympics. Together with his regular men's doubles partner, Vladimir Ivanov, the duo's emerge victories at the 2014 European Championships and 2016 All England Open rendered them as the first Russians to win the men's doubles in each of those tournaments.

== Achievements ==
=== European Games ===
Men's doubles
Year	Venue	Partner	Opponent	Score	Result
2015	Baku Sports Hall; Baku, Azerbaijan	(Russia) Vladimir Ivanov	(Denmark) Mathias Boe (Denmark) Carsten Mogensen	8–21, 13–21	Silver
2019	Falcon Club; Minsk, Belarus	(Russia) Vladimir Ivanov	(Denmark) Kim Astrup (Denmark) Anders Skaarup Rasmussen	17–21, 17–21	Bronze

=== European Championships ===
Men's doubles
Year	Venue	Partner	Opponent	Score	Result
2014	Gymnastics Center; Kazan, Russia	(Russia) Vladimir Ivanov	(Denmark) Mads Conrad-Petersen (Denmark) Mads Pieler Kolding	21–13, 21–16	Gold
2016	Vendéspace; La Roche-sur-Yon, France	(Russia) Vladimir Ivanov	(Denmark) Kim Astrup (Denmark) Anders Skaarup Rasmussen	19–21, 21–15, 16–17 retired	Bronze
2018	Palacio de los Deportes Carolina Marín; Huelva, Spain	(Russia) Vladimir Ivanov	(Denmark) Mads Conrad-Petersen (Denmark) Mads Pieler Kolding	11–21, 21–19, 19–21	Bronze
2021	Palace of Sports; Kyiv, Ukraine	(Russia) Vladimir Ivanov	(Germany) Mark Lamsfuß (Germany) Marvin Seidel	Walkover	Gold

=== Summer Universiade ===
Men's doubles
Year	Venue	Partner	Opponent	Score	Result
2013	Tennis Academy; Kazan, Russia	(Russia) Vladimir Ivanov	(South Korea) Ko Sung-hyun (South Korea) Lee Yong-dae	21–13, 13–21, 13–21	Silver

=== BWF World Tour (1 title, 1 runner-up) ===
The BWF World Tour, which was announced on 19 March 2017 and implemented in 2018, is a series of elite badminton tournaments sanctioned by the Badminton World Federation (BWF). The BWF World Tour is divided into levels of World Tour Finals, Super 1000, Super 750, Super 500, Super 300 (part of the HSBC World Tour), and the BWF Tour Super 100.

Men's doubles
Year	Tournament	Level	Partner	Opponent	Score	Result
2019	Dutch Open	Super 100	(Russia) Vladimir Ivanov	(Germany) Mark Lamsfuß (Germany) Marvin Emil Seidel	21–19, 21–16	(gold) Winner
2020	Denmark Open	Super 750	(Russia) Vladimir Ivanov	(England) Marcus Ellis (England) Chris Langridge	22–20, 17–21, 18–21	(silver) Runner-up

=== BWF Superseries (1 title) ===
The BWF Superseries, which was launched on 14 December 2006 and implemented in 2007, was a series of elite badminton tournaments, sanctioned by the Badminton World Federation (BWF). BWF Superseries levels were Superseries and Superseries Premier. A season of Superseries consisted of twelve tournaments around the world that had been introduced since 2011. Successful players were invited to the Superseries Finals, which were held at the end of each year.

Men's doubles
Year	Tournament	Partner	Opponent	Score	Result
2016	All England Open	(Russia) Vladimir Ivanov	(Japan) Hiroyuki Endo (Japan) Kenichi Hayakawa	21–23, 21–18, 21–16	(gold) Winner

BWF Super Series Finals tournament
BWF Super Series Premier tournament
BWF Super Series tournament

=== BWF Grand Prix (8 titles, 8 runners-up) ===
The BWF Grand Prix had two levels, the Grand Prix and Grand Prix Gold. It was a series of badminton tournaments sanctioned by the Badminton World Federation (BWF) and played between 2007 and 2017.

Men's doubles
Year	Tournament	Partner	Opponent	Score	Result
2008	Russian Open	(Russia) Vladimir Ivanov	(Russia) Vitalij Durkin (Russia) Aleksandr Nikolaenko	11–21, 15–21	(silver) Runner-up
2009	Russian Open	(Russia) Vladimir Ivanov	(Russia) Vitalij Durkin (Russia) Aleksandr Nikolaenko	21–19, 21–19	(gold) Winner
2010	Russian Open	(Russia) Vladimir Ivanov	(Russia) Vitalij Durkin (Russia) Aleksandr Nikolaenko	21–17, 10–21, 21–18	(gold) Winner
2012	Russian Open	(Russia) Vladimir Ivanov	(Russia) Vitalij Durkin (Russia) Aleksandr Nikolaenko	21–18, 21–15	(gold) Winner
2012	Macau Open	(Russia) Vladimir Ivanov	(Chinese Taipei) Lee Sheng-mu (Chinese Taipei) Tsai Chia-hsin	21–14, 17–21, 16–21	(silver) Runner-up
2013	Thailand Open	(Russia) Vladimir Ivanov	(South Korea) Shin Baek-choel (South Korea) Yoo Yeon-seong	21–18, 15–21, 14–21	(silver) Runner-up
2013	Russian Open	(Russia) Vladimir Ivanov	(Russia) Andrey Ashmarin (Russia) Vitalij Durkin	21–16, 21–19	(gold) Winner
2015	Syed Modi International	(Russia) Vladimir Ivanov	(Denmark) Mathias Boe (Denmark) Carsten Mogensen	9–21, 20–22	(silver) Runner-up
2015	German Open	(Russia) Vladimir Ivanov	(Denmark) Mads Conrad-Petersen (Denmark) Mads Pieler Kolding	20–22, 19–21	(silver) Runner-up
2015	Russian Open	(Russia) Vladimir Ivanov	(Malaysia) Goh V Shem (Malaysia) Tan Wee Kiong	22–20, 21–19	(gold) Winner
2015	Bitburger Open	(Russia) Vladimir Ivanov	(Denmark) Mads Conrad-Petersen (Denmark) Mads Pieler Kolding	18–21, 18–21	(silver) Runner-up
2015	U.S. Grand Prix	(Russia) Vladimir Ivanov	(Malaysia) Goh V Shem (Malaysia) Tan Wee Kiong	14–21, 17–21	(silver) Runner-up
2016	Russian Open	(Russia) Vladimir Ivanov	(Russia) Konstantin Abramov (Russia) Alexandr Zinchenko	21–15, 21–14	(gold) Winner
2017	Russian Open	(Russia) Vladimir Ivanov	(Malaysia) Chooi Kah Ming (Malaysia) Low Juan Shen	11–6, 11–9, 11–5	(gold) Winner

Mixed doubles
Year	Tournament	Partner	Opponent	Score	Result
2013	Russian Open	(Russia) Tatjana Bibik	(Russia) Vitalij Durkin (Russia) Nina Vislova	21–17, 24–22	(gold) Winner
2014	Russian Open	(Russia) Olga Morozova	(Japan) Ryota Taohata (Japan) Misato Aratama	12–21, 10–21	(silver) Runner-up

BWF Grand Prix Gold tournament
BWF Grand Prix tournament

=== BWF International Challenge/Series (14 titles, 7 runners-up) ===
Men's singles
Year	Tournament	Opponent	Score	Result
2010	White Nights	(Poland) Przemysław Wacha	22–20, 21–14	(gold) Winner
2010	Kharkiv International	(Poland) Przemysław Wacha	21–14, 22–20	(gold) Winner
2011	Guatemala International	(Russia) Vladimir Ivanov	21–16, 9–21, 21–18	(gold) Winner

Men's doubles
Year	Tournament	Partner	Opponent	Score	Result
2007	Slovak International	(Russia) Anton Ivanov	(Croatia) Zvonimir Đurkinjak (Czech Republic) Jakub Bitman	Walkover	(silver) Runner-up
2009	White Nights	(Russia) Vladimir Ivanov	(Russia) Vitalij Durkin (Russia) Aleksandr Nikolaenko	17–21, 11–21	(silver) Runner-up
2009	Bulgarian International	(Russia) Vladimir Ivanov	(Denmark) Kasper Faust Henriksen (Denmark) Anders Kristiansen	11–21, 11–21	(silver) Runner-up
2009	Hungarian International	(Russia) Vladimir Ivanov	(Poland) Adam Cwalina (Poland) Wojciech Szkudlarczyk	17–21, 21–13, 26–28	(silver) Runner-up
2010	Polish International	(Russia) Vladimir Ivanov	(Hong Kong) Yohan Hadikusumo Wiratama (Hong Kong) Wong Wai Hong	21–17, 14–21, 21–14	(gold) Winner
2010	Kharkiv International	(Russia) Vladimir Ivanov	(Poland) Adam Cwalina (Poland) Michał Łogosz	26–28, 15–21	(silver) Runner-up
2010	Italian International	(Russia) Vladimir Ivanov	(England) Anthony Clark (England) Chris Langridge	14–21, 19–21	(silver) Runner-up
2010	Turkey International	(Russia) Vladimir Ivanov	(Poland) Adam Cwalina (Poland) Michał Łogosz	21–12, 21–18	(gold) Winner
2011	Polish Open	(Russia) Vladimir Ivanov	(Poland) Adam Cwalina (Poland) Michał Łogosz	23–21, 21–17	(gold) Winner
2011	Kharkiv International	(Russia) Vladimir Ivanov	(Poland) Adam Cwalina (Poland) Michał Łogosz	19–21, 21–19, 21–16	(gold) Winner
2011	Guatemala International	(Russia) Vladimir Ivanov	(Canada) Adrian Liu (Canada) Derrick Ng	21–13, 21–16	(gold) Winner
2011	Brazil International	(Russia) Vladimir Ivanov	(Poland) Adam Cwalina (Poland) Michał Łogosz	16–21, 21–14, 24–22	(gold) Winner
2011	Scottish International	(Russia) Vladimir Ivanov	(England) Marcus Ellis (England) Peter Mills	21–19, 21–19	(gold) Winner
2011	Italian International	(Russia) Vladimir Ivanov	(Russia) Vitalij Durkin (Russia) Aleksandr Nikolaenko	21–16, 21–15	(gold) Winner
2012	Swedish Masters	(Russia) Vladimir Ivanov	(Netherlands) Jorrit de Ruiter (Netherlands) Dave Khodabux	21–16, 21–9	(gold) Winner
2012	Polish Open	(Russia) Vladimir Ivanov	(Poland) Adam Cwalina (Poland) Michał Łogosz	21–11, 21–13	(gold) Winner
2012	Finnish Open	(Russia) Vladimir Ivanov	(Russia) Nikolaj Nikolaenko (Russia) Nikolai Ukk	21–10, 21–16	(gold) Winner

Mixed doubles
Year	Tournament	Partner	Opponent	Score	Result
2008	Hungarian International	(Russia) Anastasia Prokopenko	(Russia) Vitalij Durkin (Russia) Nina Vislova	11–21, 19–21	(silver) Runner-up

BWF International Challenge tournament
BWF International Series tournament
BWF Future Series tournament
