= Vladimir Ivanov (badminton) =

Russian badminton player (born 1987)

Vladimir Ivanov Владимир Иванов
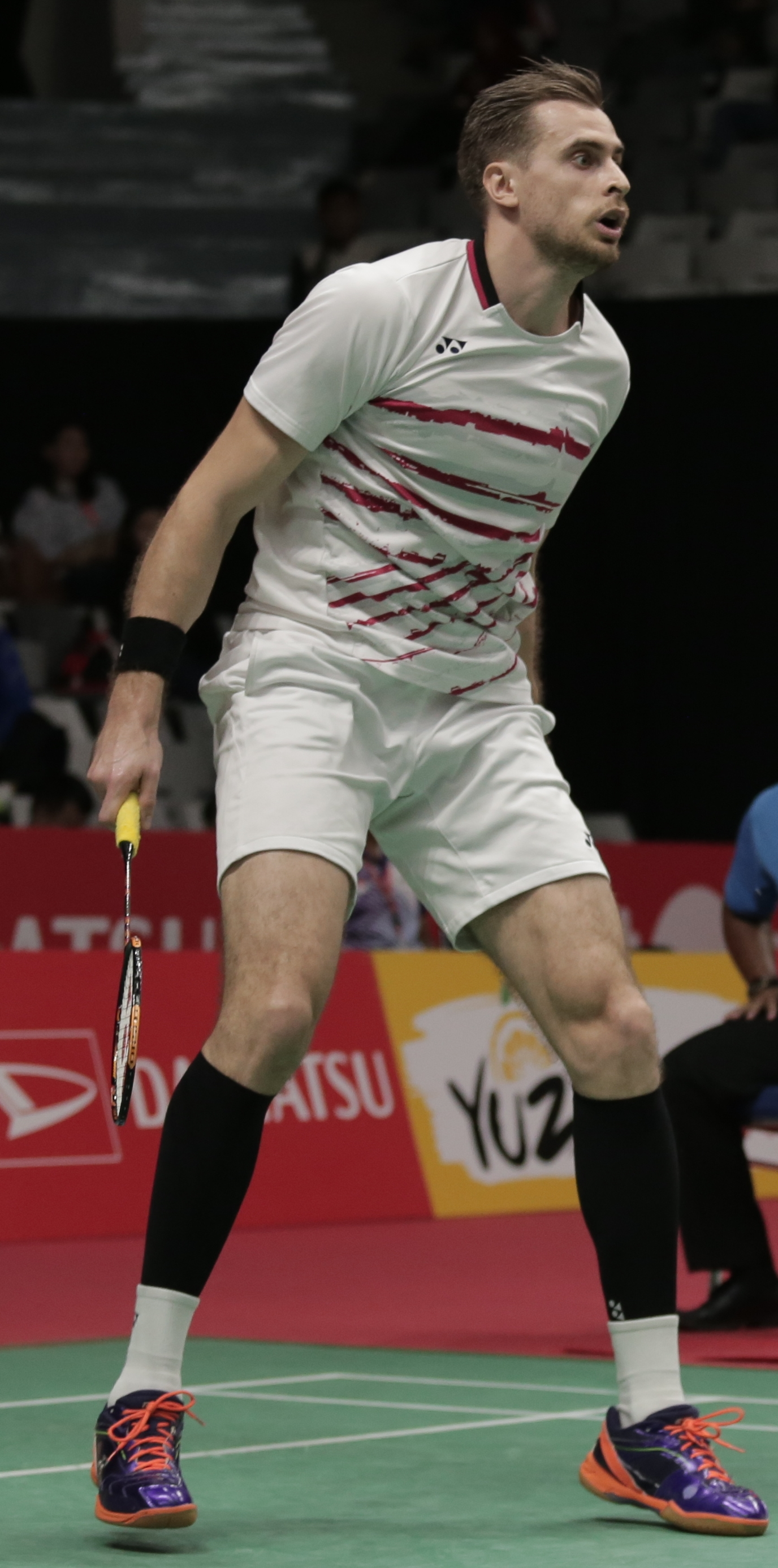

Personal information
- Born: Владимир Александрович Иванов; 3 July 1987 (age 39) Kusa, Chelyabinsk, Russian SFSR, Soviet Union
- Height: 1.97 m (6 ft 6 in)

Sport
- Country: Russia
- Sport: Badminton
- Handedness: Right

Men's singles & doubles
- Highest ranking: 28 (MS, 11 April 2013); 7 (MD with Ivan Sozonov, 7 December 2017); 70 (XD with Ashwini Ponnappa, 3 September 2015)
- BWF profile
Medal record
Men's badminton
Representing Russia
European Games
| Silver medal – second place | 2015 Baku | Men's doubles |
| Bronze medal – third place | 2019 Minsk | Men's doubles |
European Championships
| Gold medal – first place | 2014 Kazan | Men's doubles |
| Gold medal – first place | 2021 Kyiv | Men's doubles |
| Bronze medal – third place | 2014 Kazan | Men's singles |
| Bronze medal – third place | 2016 La Roche-sur-Yon | Men's doubles |
| Bronze medal – third place | 2018 Huelva | Men's doubles |
European Mixed Team Championships
| Silver medal – second place | 2017 Lubin | Mixed team |
| Bronze medal – third place | 2015 Leuven | Mixed team |
| Bronze medal – third place | 2019 Copenhagen | Mixed team |
| Bronze medal – third place | 2021 Vantaa | Mixed team |
European Men's Team Championships
| Bronze medal – third place | 2020 Liévin | Men's team |
Summer Universiade
| Silver medal – second place | 2013 Kazan | Men's doubles |
| Bronze medal – third place | 2013 Kazan | Mixed doubles |
European Junior Championships
| Silver medal – second place | 2005 Den Bosch | Mixed team |
| Bronze medal – third place | 2005 Den Bosch | Mixed doubles |

Vladimir Alexandrovich Ivanov (Russian: Владимир Александрович Иванов; born 3 July 1987) is a Russian badminton player. He was the champion at the 2014 and 2021 European Championships, and also the 2016 All England Open partnering with Ivan Sozonov. They made history by becoming the first Russian pair to win the men's doubles title in each of those events. Ivanov competed at the 2012, 2016, and 2020 Summer Olympics.

== Achievements ==
=== European Games ===
Men's doubles
| Year | Venue | Partner | Opponent | Score | Result |
|---|---|---|---|---|---|
| 2015 | Baku Sports Hall; Baku, Azerbaijan | (Russia) Ivan Sozonov | (Denmark) Mathias Boe (Denmark) Carsten Mogensen | 8–21, 13–21 | Silver |
| 2019 | Falcon Club; Minsk, Belarus | (Russia) Ivan Sozonov | (Denmark) Kim Astrup (Denmark) Anders Skaarup Rasmussen | 17–21, 17–21 | Bronze |

=== European Championships ===
Men's singles
| Year | Venue | Opponent | Score | Result |
|---|---|---|---|---|
| 2014 | Gymnastics Center, Kazan, Russia | (England) Rajiv Ouseph | 23–25, 21–13, 8–21 | Bronze |

Men's doubles
| Year | Venue | Partner | Opponent | Score | Result |
|---|---|---|---|---|---|
| 2014 | Gymnastics Center; Kazan, Russia | (Russia) Ivan Sozonov | (Denmark) Mads Conrad-Petersen (Denmark) Mads Pieler Kolding | 21–13, 21–16 | Gold |
| 2016 | Vendéspace; La Roche-sur-Yon, France | (Russia) Ivan Sozonov | (Denmark) Kim Astrup (Denmark) Anders Skaarup Rasmussen | 19–21, 21–15, 16–17 retired | Bronze |
| 2018 | Palacio de los Deportes Carolina Marín; Huelva, Spain | (Russia) Ivan Sozonov | (Denmark) Mads Conrad-Petersen (Denmark) Mads Pieler Kolding | 11–21, 21–19, 19–21 | Bronze |
| 2021 | Palace of Sports; Kyiv, Ukraine | (Russia) Ivan Sozonov | (Germany) Mark Lamsfuß (Germany) Marvin Seidel | Walkover | Gold |

=== Summer Universiade ===
Men's doubles
| Year | Venue | Partner | Opponent | Score | Result |
|---|---|---|---|---|---|
| 2013 | Tennis Academy; Kazan, Russia | (Russia) Ivan Sozonov | (South Korea) Ko Sung-hyun (South Korea) Lee Yong-dae | 21–13, 13–21, 13–21 | Silver |

Mixed doubles
| Year | Venue | Partner | Opponent | Score | Result |
|---|---|---|---|---|---|
| 2013 | Tennis Academy; Kazan, Russia | (Russia) Nina Vislova | (South Korea) Kim Gi-jung (South Korea) Kim So-young | 22–20, 19–21, 17–21 | Bronze |

=== European Junior Championships ===
Mixed doubles
| Year | Venue | Partner | Opponent | Score | Result |
|---|---|---|---|---|---|
| 2005 | De Maaspoort; Den Bosch, Netherlands | (Russia) Olga Kozlova | (Denmark) Rasmus Bonde (Denmark) Christinna Pedersen | 10–15, 8–15 | Bronze |

=== BWF World Tour (2 titles, 1 runner-up) ===
The BWF World Tour, which was announced on 19 March 2017 and implemented in 2018, is a series of elite badminton tournaments sanctioned by the Badminton World Federation (BWF). The BWF World Tour is divided into levels of World Tour Finals, Super 1000, Super 750, Super 500, Super 300 (part of the HSBC World Tour), and the BWF Tour Super 100.

Men's doubles
| Year | Tournament | Level | Partner | Opponent | Score | Result |
|---|---|---|---|---|---|---|
| 2019 | Dutch Open | Super 100 | (Russia) Ivan Sozonov | (Germany) Mark Lamsfuß (Germany) Marvin Seidel | 21–19, 21–16 | (gold) Winner |
| 2020 | Denmark Open | Super 750 | (Russia) Ivan Sozonov | (England) Marcus Ellis (England) Chris Langridge | 22–20, 17–21, 18–21 | (silver) Runner-up |

Mixed doubles
| Year | Tournament | Level | Partner | Opponent | Score | Result |
|---|---|---|---|---|---|---|
| 2018 | Russian Open | Super 100 | (South Korea) Kim Min-kyung | (India) Rohan Kapoor (India) Kuhoo Garg | 21–19, 21–17 | (gold) Winner |

=== BWF Superseries (1 title) ===
The BWF Superseries, which was launched on 14 December 2006 and implemented in 2007, was a series of elite badminton tournaments, sanctioned by the Badminton World Federation (BWF). BWF Superseries levels were Superseries and Superseries Premier. A season of Superseries consisted of twelve tournaments around the world that had been introduced since 2011. Successful players were invited to the Superseries Finals, which were held at the end of each year.

Men's doubles
| Year | Tournament | Partner | Opponent | Score | Result |
|---|---|---|---|---|---|
| 2016 | All England Open | (Russia) Ivan Sozonov | (Japan) Hiroyuki Endo (Japan) Kenichi Hayakawa | 21–23, 21–18, 21–16 | (gold) Winner |

BWF Super Series Finals tournament
BWF Super Series Premier tournament
BWF Super Series tournament

=== BWF Grand Prix (10 titles, 8 runners-up) ===
The BWF Grand Prix had two levels, the Grand Prix and Grand Prix Gold. It was a series of badminton tournaments sanctioned by the Badminton World Federation (BWF) and played between 2007 and 2017.

Men's singles
| Year | Tournament | Opponent | Score | Result |
|---|---|---|---|---|
| 2012 | U.S. Open | (Japan) Takuma Ueda | 22–20, 21–17 | (gold) Winner |
| 2013 | Russian Open | (Japan) Kenta Nishimoto | 21–17, 15–21, 21–14 | (gold) Winner |
| 2014 | Russian Open | (Japan) Riichi Takeshita | 18–21, 21–5, 21–17 | (gold) Winner |

Men's doubles
| Year | Tournament | Partner | Opponent | Score | Result |
|---|---|---|---|---|---|
| 2008 | Russian Open | (Russia) Ivan Sozonov | (Russia) Vitalij Durkin (Russia) Aleksandr Nikolaenko | 11–21, 15–21 | (silver) Runner-up |
| 2009 | Russian Open | (Russia) Ivan Sozonov | (Russia) Vitalij Durkin (Russia) Aleksandr Nikolaenko | 21–19, 21–19 | (gold) Winner |
| 2010 | Russian Open | (Russia) Ivan Sozonov | (Russia) Vitalij Durkin (Russia) Aleksandr Nikolaenko | 21–17, 10–21, 21–18 | (gold) Winner |
| 2012 | Russian Open | (Russia) Ivan Sozonov | (Russia) Vitalij Durkin (Russia) Aleksandr Nikolaenko | 21–18, 21–15 | (gold) Winner |
| 2012 | Macau Open | (Russia) Ivan Sozonov | (Chinese Taipei) Lee Sheng-mu (Chinese Taipei) Tsai Chia-hsin | 21–14, 17–21, 16–21 | (silver) Runner-up |
| 2013 | Thailand Open | (Russia) Ivan Sozonov | (South Korea) Shin Baek-choel (South Korea) Yoo Yeon-seong | 21–18, 15–21, 14–21 | (silver) Runner-up |
| 2013 | Russian Open | (Russia) Ivan Sozonov | (Russia) Andrey Ashmarin (Russia) Vitalij Durkin | 21–16, 21–19 | (gold) Winner |
| 2015 | Syed Modi International | (Russia) Ivan Sozonov | (Denmark) Mathias Boe (Denmark) Carsten Mogensen | 9–21, 20–22 | (silver) Runner-up |
| 2015 | German Open | (Russia) Ivan Sozonov | (Denmark) Mads Conrad-Petersen (Denmark) Mads Pieler Kolding | 20–22, 19–21 | (silver) Runner-up |
| 2015 | Russian Open | (Russia) Ivan Sozonov | (Malaysia) Goh V Shem (Malaysia) Tan Wee Kiong | 22–20, 21–19 | (gold) Winner |
| 2015 | Bitburger Open | (Russia) Ivan Sozonov | (Denmark) Mads Conrad-Petersen (Denmark) Mads Pieler Kolding | 18–21, 18–21 | (silver) Runner-up |
| 2015 | U.S. Grand Prix | (Russia) Ivan Sozonov | (Malaysia) Goh V Shem (Malaysia) Tan Wee Kiong | 14–21, 17–21 | (silver) Runner-up |
| 2016 | Russian Open | (Russia) Ivan Sozonov | (Russia) Konstantin Abramov (Russia) Alexandr Zinchenko | 21–15, 21–14 | (gold) Winner |
| 2017 | Russian Open | (Russia) Ivan Sozonov | (Malaysia) Chooi Kah Ming (Malaysia) Low Juan Shen | 11–6, 11–9, 11–5 | (gold) Winner |

Mixed doubles
| Year | Tournament | Partner | Opponent | Score | Result |
|---|---|---|---|---|---|
| 2016 | Russian Open | (Russia) Valeria Sorokina | (India) Pranaav Jerry Chopra (India) N. Sikki Reddy | 17–21, 19–21 | (silver) Runner-up |

BWF Grand Prix Gold tournament
BWF Grand Prix tournament

=== BWF International Challenge/Series (12 titles, 7 runners-up) ===
Men's singles
| Year | Tournament | Opponent | Score | Result |
|---|---|---|---|---|
| 2011 | Polish Open | (Spain) Pablo Abian | 14–21, 12–21 | (silver) Runner-up |
| 2011 | Guatemala International | (Russia) Ivan Sozonov | 16–21, 21–9, 18–21 | (silver) Runner-up |

Men's doubles
| Year | Tournament | Partner | Opponent | Score | Result |
|---|---|---|---|---|---|
| 2009 | White Nights | (Russia) Ivan Sozonov | (Russia) Vitalij Durkin (Russia) Aleksandr Nikolaenko | 17–21, 11–21 | (silver) Runner-up |
| 2009 | Bulgarian International | (Russia) Ivan Sozonov | (Denmark) Kasper Faust Henriksen (Denmark) Anders Kristiansen | 11–21, 11–21 | (silver) Runner-up |
| 2009 | Hungarian International | (Russia) Ivan Sozonov | (Poland) Adam Cwalina (Poland) Wojciech Szkudlarczyk | 17–21, 21–13, 26–28 | (silver) Runner-up |
| 2010 | Polish International | (Russia) Ivan Sozonov | (Hong Kong) Yohan Hadikusumo Wiratama (Hong Kong) Wong Wai Hong | 21–17, 14–21, 21–14 | (gold) Winner |
| 2010 | Kharkiv International | (Russia) Ivan Sozonov | (Poland) Adam Cwalina (Poland) Michał Łogosz | 26–28, 15–21 | (silver) Runner-up |
| 2010 | Italian International | (Russia) Ivan Sozonov | (England) Anthony Clark (England) Chris Langridge | 14–21, 19–21 | (silver) Runner-up |
| 2010 | Turkey International | (Russia) Ivan Sozonov | (Poland) Adam Cwalina (Poland) Michał Łogosz | 21–12, 21–18 | (gold) Winner |
| 2011 | Polish Open | (Russia) Ivan Sozonov | (Poland) Adam Cwalina (Poland) Michał Łogosz | 23–21, 21–17 | (gold) Winner |
| 2011 | Kharkiv International | (Russia) Ivan Sozonov | (Poland) Adam Cwalina (Poland) Michał Łogosz | 19–21, 21–19, 21–16 | (gold) Winner |
| 2011 | Guatemala International | (Russia) Ivan Sozonov | (Canada) Adrian Liu (Canada) Derrick Ng | 21–13, 21–16 | (gold) Winner |
| 2011 | Brazil International | (Russia) Ivan Sozonov | (Poland) Adam Cwalina (Poland) Michał Łogosz | 16–21, 21–14, 24–22 | (gold) Winner |
| 2011 | Scottish International | (Russia) Ivan Sozonov | (England) Marcus Ellis (England) Peter Mills | 21–19, 21–19 | (gold) Winner |
| 2011 | Italian International | (Russia) Ivan Sozonov | (Russia) Vitalij Durkin (Russia) Aleksandr Nikolaenko | 21–16, 21–15 | (gold) Winner |
| 2012 | Swedish Masters | (Russia) Ivan Sozonov | (Netherlands) Jorrit de Ruiter (Netherlands) Dave Khodabux | 21–16, 21–9 | (gold) Winner |
| 2012 | Polish Open | (Russia) Ivan Sozonov | (Poland) Adam Cwalina (Poland) Michał Łogosz | 21–11, 21–13 | (gold) Winner |
| 2012 | Finnish Open | (Russia) Ivan Sozonov | (Russia) Nikolaj Nikolaenko (Russia) Nikolai Ukk | 21–10, 21–16 | (gold) Winner |

Mixed doubles
| Year | Tournament | Partner | Opponent | Score | Result |
|---|---|---|---|---|---|
| 2019 | Italian International | (Russia) Ekaterina Bolotova | (South Korea) Kim Sa-rang (South Korea) Eom Hye-won | 21–12, 18–21, 21–15 | (gold) Winner |

BWF International Challenge tournament
BWF International Series tournament
