= Marina Yakusheva =

Russian badminton player

Personal information
- Born: 19 June 1974 (age 52) Moscow, Soviet Union
- Height: 1.7 m (5 ft 7 in)

Sport
- Country: Russia
- Sport: Badminton
- Handedness: Right
- BWF profile
Medal record
Women's Badminton
Representing Russia
European Championships
Silver medal – second place	1996 Herning	Women's singles
Bronze medal – third place	2000 Glasgow	Women's doubles
Representing Soviet Union
European Junior Championships
Gold medal – first place	1991 Budapest	Mixed team

Marina Alexandrovna Yakusheva (Russian: Марина Александровна Якушева; born 19 June 1974) is a Russian badminton player. She won the women's singles silver medal at the 1996 European Championships, and a bronze medal in the women's doubles in 2000.

Yakusheva competed in badminton at the 2004 Summer Olympics in mixed doubles with partner Nikolai Zuyev. They were defeated by Anggun Nugroho and Eny Widiowati of Indonesia in the round of 32. In her home country of Russia she won 13 national titles.

== Achievements ==
=== European Championships ===
Women's singles
Year	Venue	Opponent	Score	Result
1996	Herning Badminton Klub, Herning, Denmark	(Denmark) Camilla Martin	0–11, 3–11	Silver

Women's doubles
Year	Venue	Partner	Opponent	Score	Result
2000	Kelvin Hall; Glasgow, Scotland	(Russia) Irina Ruslyakova	(England) Joanne Goode (England) Donna Kellogg	13–15, 13–15	Bronze

=== IBF World Grand Prix ===
The World Badminton Grand Prix was sanctioned by the International Badminton Federation from 1983 to 2006.

Women's singles
Year	Tournament	Opponent	Score	Result
1993	Russian Open	(Russia) Marina Andrievskaya	1–11, 4–11	(silver) Runner-up
1994	Russian Open	(China) Xu Li	5–11, 7–11	(silver) Runner-up
1995	French Open	(Russia) Elena Rybkina	4–11, 1–11	(silver) Runner-up

Women's doubles
Year	Tournament	Partner	Opponent	Score	Result
1993	Swiss Open	(Russia) Marina Andrievskaya	(England) Gillian Clark (England) Joanne Wright	8–15, 7–15	(silver) Runner-up
1993	Finnish Open	(Russia) Marina Andrievskaya	(Denmark) Camilla Martin (Denmark) Marlene Thomsen	1–15, 3–15	(silver) Runner-up
1993	Russian Open	(Russia) Marina Andrievskaya	(South Korea) Cha Yoon-sook (South Korea) Yoo Eun-young	13–15, 15–13, 15–1	(gold) Winner
1994	Russian Open	(Russia) Svetlana Alferova	(Ukraine) Viktoria Evtushenko (Ukraine) Elena Nozdran	15–1, 15–7	(gold) Winner
1995	French Open	(Russia) Elena Rybkina	(Sweden) Margit Borg (Sweden) Maria Bengtsson	10–15, 4–15	(silver) Runner-up
1995	Russian Open	(Russia) Elena Rybkina	(China) Chen Ying (China) Peng Xingyong	4–15, 12–15	(silver) Runner-up
2006	U.S. Open	(Russia) Ella Karachkova	(Russia) Valeria Sorokina (Russia) Nina Vislova	15–21, 18–21	(silver) Runner-up

Mixed doubles
Year	Tournament	Partner	Opponent	Score	Result
1993	Russian Open	(Russia) Sergey Melnikov	(Russia) Nikolai Zuyev (Russia) Marina Andrievskaya	14–17, 7–15	(silver) Runner-up
1995	Thailand Open	(Russia) Nikolai Zuyev	(South Korea) Park Joo-bong (South Korea) Ra Kyung-min	1–15, 4–15	(silver) Runner-up

=== IBF International ===
Women's singles
Year	Tournament	Opponent	Score	Result
1991	Portugal International	(Netherlands) Astrid van der Knaap	5–11, 6–11	(silver) Runner-up
1991	Czechoslovakian International	(Soviet Union) Irina Serova	5–11, 0–11	(silver) Runner-up
1992	Polish International	(Commonwealth of Independent States) Natalja Ivanova	11–8, 12–10	(gold) Winner
1992	Russian International	(Commonwealth of Independent States) Marina Andrievskaya	3–11, 11–3, 11–6	(gold) Winner
1994	Portugal International	(Austria) Irina Serova	12–11, 11–7	(gold) Winner
1994	Wimbledon International	(Russia) Irina Yakusheva	11–3, 2–11, 11–2	(gold) Winner
1995	Wimbledon International	(Russia) Elena Rybkina	11–5, 12–11	(gold) Winner
1999	Welsh International	(Russia) Ella Karachkova	11–3, 11–7	(gold) Winner
2000	Austrian International	(England) Rebecca Pantaney	7–11, 11–1, 11–9	(gold) Winner

Women's doubles
Year	Tournament	Partner	Opponent	Score	Result
1991	Portugal International	(Soviet Union) Elena Denisova	(England) Tracy Dineen (England) Felicity Gallup	7–15, 15–9, 15–10	(gold) Winner
1992	Polish International	(Commonwealth of Independent States) Marina Andrievskaya	(Denmark) Rikke Broen (Denmark) Anne Søndergaard	15–4, 15–5	(gold) Winner
1992	Russian International	(Commonwealth of Independent States) Marina Andrievskaya	(Commonwealth of Independent States) Natalja Ivanova (Commonwealth of Independent States) Julia Martynenko	17–14, 15–9	(gold) Winner
1992	Irish International	(Commonwealth of Independent States) Marina Andrievskaya	(Denmark) Anne Søndergaard (Denmark) Lotte Thomsen	15–7, 15–4	(gold) Winner
1993	Portugal International	(Russia) Marina Andrievskaya	(Hong Kong) Chung Hoi Yuk (Hong Kong) Wong Chun Fan	6–15, 15–6, 15–7	(gold) Winner
1994	Wimbledon International	(Russia) Irina Yakusheva	(England) Nichola Beck (England) Tracy Dineen	15–9, 11–15, 15–10	(gold) Winner
1995	Welsh International	(Russia) Elena Rybkina	(England) Gail Emms (Netherlands) Lotte Jonathans	15–8, 15–4	(gold) Winner
1996	Amor International	(Russia) Elena Sukhareva	(Russia) Nadezhda Chervyakova (Russia) Ella Karachkova	15–7, 15–5	(gold) Winner
1999	Scottish International	(Russia) Irina Ruslyakova	(Japan) Takae Masumo (Japan) Chikako Nakayama	10–15, 5–15	(silver) Runner-up
1999	Welsh International	(Russia) Irina Ruslyakova	(England) Gail Emms (England) Joanne Wright	17–14, 17–14	(gold) Winner
1999	Irish International	(Russia) Irina Ruslyakova	(Japan) Naomi Murakami (Japan) Hiromi Yamada	15–11, 6–15, 16–17	(silver) Runner-up
2000	Austrian International	(Russia) Irina Ruslyakova	(England) Rebecca Pantaney (England) Joanne Wright	2–15, 15–9, 6–15	(silver) Runner-up
2000	Russian International	(Russia) Irina Ruslyakova	(Russia) Ella Karachkova (Russia) Anastasia Russkikh	15–8, 15–10	(gold) Winner
2001	French International	(Russia) Irina Ruslyakova	(Netherlands) Erica van den Heuvel (Netherlands) Nicole van Hooren	0–7, 7–4, 1–7, 8–6, 4–7	(silver) Runner-up
2001	Slovenian International	(Russia) Elena Shimko	(Switzerland) Fabienne Baumeyer (Switzerland) Judith Baumeyer	7–0, 7–0, 7–0	(gold) Winner
2002	Austrian International	(Russia) Elena Shimko	(Denmark) Helle Nielsen (Denmark) Lene Mørk	4–7, 0–7, 5–7	(silver) Runner-up
2002	Bulgarian International	(Russia) Natalia Gorodnicheva	(Romania) Alexandra Olariu (Romania) Florentina Petre	11–11, 11–2	(gold) Winner
2002	Hungarian International	(Russia) Elena Shimko	(Russia) Elena Sukhareva (Russia) Natalia Gorodnicheva	11–8, 11–9	(gold) Winner
2003	French International	(Russia) Elena Shimko	(Japan) Yoshiko Iwata (Japan) Miyuki Tai	1–11, 11–7, 9–11	(silver) Runner-up
2003	Slovak International	(Russia) Elena Shimko	(Russia) Ekaterina Ananina (Russia) Irina Ruslyakova	15–7, 15–13	(gold) Winner
2003	Slovenian International	(Russia) Elena Shimko	(Iceland) Ragna Ingólfsdóttir (Iceland) Sara Jónsdóttir	15–6, 15–3	(gold) Winner
2003	Hungarian International	(Russia) Elena Shimko	(Poland) Kamila Augustyn (Poland) Nadieżda Kostiuczyk	16–17, 9–15	(silver) Runner-up
2004	Portugal International	(Russia) Elena Shimko	(Poland) Kamila Augustyn (Poland) Nadieżda Kostiuczyk	6–15, 5–15	(silver) Runner-up
2005	Italian International	(Russia) Ella Karachkova	(Russia) Valeria Sorokina (Russia) Nina Vislova	15–2, 8–15, 5–15	(silver) Runner-up
2006	Belgian International	(Russia) Elena Shimko	(Russia) Valeria Sorokina (Russia) Nina Vislova	21–13, 21–13	(gold) Winner
2006	Scottish International	(Russia) Elena Shimko	(Russia) Valeria Sorokina (Russia) Nina Vislova	22–20, 21–13	(gold) Winner

Mixed doubles
Year	Tournament	Partner	Opponent	Score	Result
1991	Czechoslovakian International	(Soviet Union) Vladislav Druzchenko	(Germany) Michael Helber (Germany) Anne-Katrin Seid	15–9, 13–15, 15–4	(gold) Winner
1992	Russian International	(Commonwealth of Independent States) Nikolai Zuyev	(Commonwealth of Independent States) Vladimir Nikolenko (Commonwealth of Independent States) Irina Gritsenko	15–3, 15–11	(gold) Winner
1993	Portugal International	(Russia) Nikolai Zuyev	(Hong Kong) Chan Siu Kwong (Hong Kong) Chung Hoi Yuk	17–15, 15–11	(gold) Winner
1994	Wimbledon International	(Russia) Nikolai Zuyev	(England) John Quinn (England) Joanne Muggeridge	7–15, 9–15	(silver) Runner-up
1995	Wimbledon International	(Russia) Nikolai Zuyev	(England) Ian Pearson (England) Joanne Davies	12–15, 15–11, 5–15	(silver) Runner-up
1995	Welsh International	(Russia) Nikolai Zuyev	(England) Julian Robertson (England) Lorraine Cole	15–11, 15–7	(gold) Winner
1997	La Chaux-de-Fonds International	(Ukraine) Vladislav Druzchenko	(England) Nathan Robertson (England) Sarah Hardaker	15–9, 3–15, 15–10	(gold) Winner
2000	Russian International	(Russia) Artur Khachaturyan	(Russia) Pavel Uvarov (Russia) Irina Ruslyakova	15–13, 7–15, 0–15	(silver) Runner-up
2001	Slovenian International	(Russia) Nikolai Zuyev	(Scotland) Russell Hogg (Scotland) Kirsteen McEwan	7–5, 7–3, 7–2	(gold) Winner
2001	Welsh International	(Russia) Nikolai Zuyev	(Canada) Mike Beres (Canada) Kara Solmundson	7–1, 5–7, 7–1, ...–...	(gold) Winner
2002	Bulgarian International	(Russia) Nikolai Zuyev	(Bulgaria) Konstantin Dobrev (Bulgaria) Petya Nedelcheva	4–11, 11–9, 11–7	(gold) Winner
2002	Slovak International	(Russia) Nikolai Zuyev	(Belarus) Andrey Konakh (Belarus) Nadieżda Kostiuczyk	4–11, 5–11	(silver) Runner-up
2002	Hungarian International	(Russia) Nikolai Zuyev	(Russia) Sergey Ivlev (Russia) Natalia Gorodnicheva	11–5, 8–11, 7–11	(silver) Runner-up
2002	Scottish International	(Russia) Nikolai Zuyev	(England) Robert Blair (England) Natalie Munt	11–6, 12–13, 9–11	(silver) Runner-up
2002	Welsh International	(Russia) Nikolai Zuyev	(Wales) Matthew Hughes (England) Joanne Muggeridge	11–4, 11–6	(gold) Winner
2003	Slovenian International	(Russia) Nikolai Zuyev	(England) Simon Archer (England) Donna Kellogg	2–15, 16–17	(silver) Runner-up
2003	Hungarian International	(Russia) Nikolai Zuyev	(Ukraine) Dmitry Miznikov (Ukraine) Natalia Golovkina	15–13, 15–1	(gold) Winner
2003	Bitburger International	(Russia) Nikolai Zuyev	(Sweden) Fredrik Bergström (Sweden) Johanna Persson	15–13, 10–15, 13–15	(silver) Runner-up
2004	Swedish International	(Russia) Nikolai Zuyev	(Germany) Kristof Hopp (Germany) Kathrin Piotrowski	15–5, 13–15, 11–15	(silver) Runner-up
2004	French International	(Russia) Nikolai Zuyev	(China) Xie Zhongbo (China) Yu Yang	16–17, 9–15	(silver) Runner-up
2004	Slovak International	(Russia) Nikolai Zuyev	(England) Peter Jeffrey (England) Hayley Connor	15–4, 15–2	(gold) Winner
2004	Hungarian International	(Russia) Nikolai Zuyev	(Malaysia) Ong Ewe Hock (Malaysia) Lim Pek Siah	15–5, 9–15, 5–15	(silver) Runner-up
2005	Swedish International	(Russia) Nikolai Zuyev	(England) Kristian Roebuck (England) Liza Parker	15–4, 15–8	(gold) Winner
2005	Italian International	(Russia) Vitalij Durkin	(Russia) Aleksandr Nikolaenko (Russia) Valeria Sorokina	15–10, 15–9	(gold) Winner
