= Irina Ruslyakova =

Russian badminton player (born 1975)

Personal information
- Born: Irina Aleksandrovna Ruslyakova (Ирина Александровна Руслякова); 12 September 1975 (age 51) Vladivostok, Soviet Union
- Height: 1.83 m (6 ft 0 in)
- Weight: 75 kg (165 lb)

Sport
- Country: Russia
- Sport: Badminton
- BWF profile
Medal record
Women's badminton
Representing Russia
European Championships
Bronze medal – third place	2000 Glasgow	Women's doubles

Irina Aleksandrovna Ruslyakova (Russian: Ирина Александровна Руслякова; born 12 September 1975) is a Russian badminton player. She competed in 2000 Olympic Games in the women's doubles with partner Marina Yakusheva. Ruslyakova won a bronze medal in the women's doubles at the 2000 European Championships.

== Achievements ==
=== European Championships ===
Women's doubles
Year	Venue	Partner	Opponent	Score	Result
2000	Kelvin Hall; Glasgow, Scotland	(Russia) Marina Yakusheva	(England) Joanne Goode (England) Donna Kellogg	13–15, 13–15	Bronze

=== IBF International ===
Women's doubles
Year	Tournament	Partner	Opponent	Score	Result
1999	Scottish International	(Russia) Marina Yakusheva	(Japan) Takae Masumo (Japan) Chikako Nakayama	10–15, 5–15	(silver) Runner-up
1999	Welsh International	(Russia) Marina Yakusheva	(England) Gail Emms (England) Joanne Wright	17–14, 17–14	(gold) Winner
1999	Irish International	(Russia) Marina Yakusheva	(Japan) Naomi Murakami (Japan) Hiromi Yamada	15–11, 6–15, 16–17	(silver) Runner-up
2000	Austrian International	(Russia) Marina Yakusheva	(England) Rebecca Pantaney (England) Joanne Wright	2–15, 15–9, 6–15	(silver) Runner-up
2000	Russian International	(Russia) Marina Yakusheva	(Russia) Ella Karachkova (Russia) Anastasia Russkikh	15–8, 15–10	(gold) Winner
2001	French International	(Russia) Marina Yakusheva	(Netherlands) Erica van den Heuvel (Netherlands) Nicole van Hooren	0–7, 7–4, 1–7, 8–6, 4–7	(silver) Runner-up
2003	Austrian International	(Russia) Ekaterina Ananina	(Russia) Natalia Gorodnicheva (Russia) Elena Sukhareva	11–8, 7–11, 11–5	(gold) Winner
2003	Slovak International	(Russia) Ekaterina Ananina	(Russia) Elena Shimko (Russia) Marina Yakusheva	7–15, 13–15	(silver) Runner-up
2004	Russian International	(Russia) Anastasia Russkikh	(Russia) Valeria Sorokina (Russia) Nina Vislova	15–2, 15–3	(gold) Winner

Mixed doubles
Year	Tournament	Partner	Opponent	Score	Result
2000	Russian International	(Russia) Pavel Uvarov	(Russia) Artur Khachaturyan (Russia) Marina Yakusheva	13–15, 15–7, 15–0	(gold) Winner
