= Inoki Theopilus =

German badminton player (born 1977)

Personal information
- Born: Inoki Theopilus Cahyadi; 3 August 1977 (age 48)

Sport
- Country: Germany; France
- Sport: Badminton

Men's singles & doubles
- Highest ranking: 295 (MS 28 March 2013); 463 (MD 16 August 2012)
- BWF profile

Inoki Theopilus Cahyadi (born 3 August 1977) is a German badminton player. In 2003, he won Italian International tournament in men's doubles event with his partner Agus Sugimin. In 2012, he became a badminton coach at Issy-les-Moulineaux club in France, and in the same year he became the runner-up of Hungarian International tournament as a French badminton player.
