= Nikolaj Nikolaenko =

Russian badminton player (born 1978)

Personal information
- Born: Nikolaj Nikolaevich Nikolaenko (Николай Николаевич Николаенко); 29 January 1978 (age 48) Novosibirsk, Russian SFSR, Soviet Union

Sport
- Country: Russia
- Sport: Badminton
- Coached by: L.E. Remizova

Men's singles & doubles
- Highest ranking: 189 (MS, 5 May 2011); 77 (MD, 27 September 2012); 180 (XD, 5 April 2012)
- BWF profile
Medal record
Men's badminton
Representing Russia
European Junior Championships
Silver medal – second place	1997 Nymburk	Mixed team
Bronze medal – third place	1997 Nymburk	Boys' singles

Nikolaj Nikolaevich Nikolaenko (Russian: Николай Николаевич Николаенко; born 29 January 1978) is a Russian badminton player. In 2013, he won Hellas International tournament in men's doubles event with his partner Nikolai Ukk.

== Achievements ==
=== European Junior Championships ===
Boys' singles
Year	Venue	Opponent	Score	Result
1997	Nymburk, Czech Republic	(Netherlands) Dicky Palyama	6–15, 4–15	Bronze

=== BWF Grand Prix ===
The BWF Grand Prix had two levels, the Grand Prix and Grand Prix Gold. It was a series of badminton tournaments sanctioned by the Badminton World Federation (BWF) and played between 2007 and 2017. The World Badminton Grand Prix was sanctioned by the International Badminton Federation from 1983 to 2006.

Men's doubles
Year	Tournament	Partner	Opponent	Score	Result
2005	Russian Open	(Russia) Alexey Vasiliev	(Russia) Konstantin Khlestov (Russia) Vladimir Malkov	15–5, 15–6	(gold) Winner

Mixed doubles
Year	Tournament	Partner	Opponent	Score	Result
2005	Russian Open	(Russia) Valeria Sorokina	(Russia) Sergey Lunev (Russia) Evgenia Dimova	10–15, 8–15	(silver) Runner-up

BWF Grand Prix Gold tournament
BWF Grand Prix tournament

=== BWF International ===
Men's doubles
Year	Tournament	Partner	Opponent	Score	Result
2002	Norwegian International	(Russia) Aleksandr Nikolaenko	(Sweden) Imanuel Hirschfeldt (Sweden) Jörgen Olsson	15–9, 15–13	(gold) Winner
2011	Cyprus International	(Russia) Nikolai Ukk	(Denmark) Theis Christiansen (Denmark) Niclas Nøhr	17–21, 13–21	(silver) Runner-up
2012	Finnish Open	(Russia) Nikolai Ukk	(Russia) Vladimir Ivanov (Russia) Ivan Sozonov	10–21, 16–21	(silver) Runner-up
2013	Hellas International	(Russia) Nikolai Ukk	(Vietnam) Đỗ Tuấn Đức (Vietnam) Phạm Hồng Nam	21–14, 21–16	(gold) Winner

Mixed doubles
Year	Tournament	Partner	Opponent	Score	Result
2011	Cyprus International	(Russia) Anastasia Chervyakova	(Denmark) Niclas Nøhr (Denmark) Joan Christiansen	21–23, 18–21	(silver) Runner-up

BWF International Challenge tournament
BWF International Series tournament
BWF Future Series tournament
