= 2012 Russia Open Grand Prix =

Tournament details
- Dates: June 26, 2012 - July 1, 2012
- Total prize money: US$50,000
- Venue: Sports Hall Olympic
- Location: Vladivostok, Russia

The 2012 Russia Open Grand Prix was the sixth grand prix gold and grand prix tournament of the 2012 BWF Grand Prix Gold and Grand Prix. The tournament was held in Sports Hall Olympic, Vladivostok, Russia June 26 until July 1, 2012, and had a total purse of $50,000.

== Women's doubles ==
=== Seeds ===
1. (Russia) Valeria Sorokina / Nina Vislova (champion)
2. (Turkey) Ozge Bayrak / Neslihan Yigit (withdrew)

=== Finals ===
Semifinals
1	(Russia) Valeria Sorokina (Russia) Nina Vislova	21	21
(Russia) Olga Golovanova (Russia) Anastasia Panushkina	10	19
(Bulgaria) Gabriela Stoeva (Bulgaria) Stefani Stoeva	18	18
(Russia) Tatjana Bibik (Russia) Anastasia Chervaykova	21	21

Final
1	(Russia) Valeria Sorokina (Russia) Nina Vislova
(Russia) Tatjana Bibik (Russia) Anastasia Chervaykova	wo

=== Top half ===
First Round
1	(Russia) V Sorokina (Russia) N Vislova
BYE
(Russia) V Dergunova (Russia) R Gabdullina
BYE
(Russia) K Averkina (Russia) A Vendina
BYE
(Russia) A Markevich (Russia) K Rogozhnikova	12	5
(Russia) O Golovanova (Russia) A Panushkina	21	21

Quarter Final
1	(Russia) V Sorokina (Russia) N Vislova	21	21
(Russia) V Dergunova (Russia) R Gabdullina	15	18
(Russia) K Averkina (Russia) A Vendina	4	10
(Russia) O Golovanova (Russia) A Panushkina	21	21

Semi Final
1	(Russia) V Sorokina (Russia) N Vislova	21	21
(Russia) O Golovanova (Russia) A Panushkina	10	19

=== Bottom half ===
First Round
(Russia) V Dereviyagina (Russia) A Egoshina	6	6
(Bulgaria) G Stoeva (Bulgaria) S Stoeva	21	21
BYE
(Russia) P Makkoveeva (Russia) M Parkhomenko
(Russia) A Artamonova (Russia) O Lipkina	9	3
(Russia) T Bibik (Russia) A Chervaykova	21	21
BYE
2	(Turkey) O Bayrak (Turkey) N Yigit

Quarter Final
(Bulgaria) G Stoeva (Bulgaria) S Stoeva	21	21
(Russia) P Makkoveeva (Russia) M Parkhomenko	7	4
(Russia) T Bibik (Russia) A Chervaykova
2	(Turkey) O Bayrak (Turkey) N Yigit	wo

Semi Final
(Bulgaria) G Stoeva (Bulgaria) S Stoeva	18	18
(Russia) T Bibik (Russia) A Chervaykova	21	21

== Mixed doubles ==
=== Seeds ===
1. (Russia) Alexandr Nikolaenko / Valeria Sorokina (champion)
2. (Russia) Vitalij Durkin / Nina Vislova (final)

=== Finals ===
Semifinals
1	(Russia) Alexandr Nikolaenko (Russia) Valeria Sorokina	21	21
(Russia) Evgenij Dremin (Russia) Svetlana Korotisheva	6	17
(Russia) Sergey Lunev (Russia) Evgenia Dimova	17	19
2	(Russia) Vitalij Durkin (Russia) Nina Vislova	21	21

Final
1	(Russia) Alexandr Nikolaenko (Russia) Valeria Sorokina	21	21
2	(Russia) Vitalij Durkin (Russia) Nina Vislova	19	17

=== Top half ===
First Round
1	(Russia) A Nikolaenko (Russia) V Sorokina
BYE
(Russia) A Ashmarin (Russia) A Panushkina	21	21
(Russia) S Shumilkin (Russia) D Zhurba	4	15
(Russia) A Derbenev (Russia) P Makkoveeva	16	16
(Russia) G Kosenko (Russia) O Lipkina	21	21
(Russia) E Dremin (Russia) S Korotisheva	21	21
(Russia) G Martynenko (Russia) K Averkina	8	10

Quarter Final
1	(Russia) A Nikolaenko (Russia) V Sorokina	21	21
(Russia) A Ashmarin (Russia) A Panushkina	16	17
(Russia) G Kosenko (Russia) O Lipkina	10	15
(Russia) E Dremin (Russia) S Korotisheva	21	21

Semi Final
1	(Russia) A Nikolaenko (Russia) V Sorokina	21	21
(Russia) E Dremin (Russia) S Korotisheva	6	17

=== Bottom half ===
First Round
(Russia) S Lunev (Russia) E Dimova	21	21
(Russia) A Vinogradov (Russia) A Markevich	6	8
(Russia) D Grachev (Russia) A Chervaykova	21	21
(Russia) E Karpov (Russia) A Vendina	7	9
(Russia) I Zdanov (Russia) A Egoshina	17	15
(Russia) V Rusin (Russia) A Artamonova	21	21
BYE
2	(Russia) V Durkin (Russia) N Vislova

Quarter Final
(Russia) S Lunev (Russia) E Dimova	21	22
(Russia) D Grachev (Russia) A Chervaykova	13	20
(Russia) V Rusin (Russia) A Artamonova	13	9
2	(Russia) V Durkin (Russia) N Vislova	21	21

Semi Final
(Russia) S Lunev (Russia) E Dimova	17	19
2	(Russia) V Durkin (Russia) N Vislova	21	21

Preceded by 2012 Thailand Open Grand Prix Gold	BWF Grand Prix Gold and Grand Prix; 2012 season	Succeeded by 2012 U.S. Open Grand Prix Gold
