= European Badminton Circuit =

The European Badminton Circuit is a series of international badminton tournaments in Europe, sanctioned by Badminton World Federation (BWF). The circuit consists of BWF International Challenge, BWF International Series and BWF Future Series tournaments held in Europe. The circuit usually starts in September and ends in April.

== History ==
The competition series was founded in 1987 by the European Badminton Union as the European Grand Prix in order to bundle existing international tournaments into a European scoring system. In addition to awarding points for the EBU ranking, points were and are also awarded for the world ranking. After the first two years, in which the winner was chosen solely based on points, a final Masters tournament was held for three years to determine the EBU Circuit winners. Since the 1992/1993 season, the winners have again been determined based on points earned, and rankings are also awarded in the doubles disciplines. Since the 2007/2008 season, the tournament series has been called the BE Circuit. Depending on sponsorship, scheduling, and the ability to find a host, the circuit has in some years culminated in a final. There is the BE Junior Circuit for junior athletes.

== Prize money ==
BWF International Challenge tournaments offers more than $20,000 prize money, while BWF International Series tournaments offers more than $8,000 prize money. BWF Future Series tournaments offers up to $8,000 of prize money. The distribution of prize money differs on each tournament type. BWF International Challenge tournaments rewards prize money for semifinalist for singles and only both finalist for doubles. BWF International Series tournaments offers prize money for finalist for singles and the doubles champion. BWF Future Series tournaments only distribute prize money to champions of singles and doubles.

== Editions ==
List of BE Circuit:

1. EBU Circuit 1987/88
2. EBU Circuit 1988/89
3. EBU Circuit 1989/90
4. EBU Circuit 1990/91
5. EBU Circuit 1991/92
6. EBU Circuit 1992/93
7. EBU Circuit 1993/94
8. EBU Circuit 1994/95
9. EBU Circuit 1995/96
10. EBU Circuit 1996/97
11. EBU Circuit 1997/98
12. EBU Circuit 1998/99
13. EBU Circuit 1999/00
14. EBU Circuit 2000/01
15. EBU Circuit 2001/02
16. EBU Circuit 2002/03
17. EBU Circuit 2003/04
18. EBU Circuit 2004/05
19. EBU Circuit 2005/06
20. EBU Circuit 2006/07
21. BE Circuit 2007/08
22. BE Circuit 2008/09
23. BE Circuit 2009/10
24. BE Circuit 2010/11
25. BE Circuit 2011/12
26. BE Circuit 2012/13
27. BE Circuit 2013/14
28. BE Circuit 2014/15
29. BE Circuit 2016
30. BE Circuit 2017
31. BE Circuit 2018
32. BE Circuit 2019
33. BE Circuit 2020
34. BE Circuit 2021
35. BE Circuit 2022
36. BE Circuit 2023
37. BE Circuit 2024 - 32 Events
38. BE Circuit 2025 - 29 Events

== See also ==
- European Badminton Junior Circuit
