= 2004–05 European Badminton Circuit season =

The 2004–05 European Badminton Circuit season started in September 2004 and ended in April 2005.

== Results ==
=== Winners ===
Circuit	Men's singles	Women's singles	Men's doubles	Women's doubles	Mixed doubles
Bulgarian International	(England) Nathan Rice	(England) Elizabeth Cann	(Indonesia) Ruben Gordown Khosadalina (Indonesia) Aji Basuki Sindoro	(Iceland) Ragna Ingólfsdóttir (Iceland) Sara Jónsdóttir	(England) Steve Foster (England) Jenny Wallwork
Czech International	(Sweden) Per-Henrik Croona	(Germany) Katja Michalowsky	(Canada) Mike Beres (Canada) William Milroy	(Denmark) Britta Andersen (Denmark) Mie Schjøtt-Kristensen	(Denmark) Jesper Thomsen (Denmark) Britta Andersen
Slovak International	(Russia) Evgeniy Isakov	(Italy) Hui Ding	(Russia) Nikolai Zuyev (Russia) Sergei Ivlev	(Malaysia) Lim Pek Siah (Malaysia) Chor Hooi Yee	(Russia) Nikolai Zuyev (Russia) Marina Yakusheva
Hungarian International	(Canada) Bobby Milroy	(Bulgaria) Petya Nedelcheva	(Russia) Nikolai Zuyev (Russia) Sergei Ivlev	(Malaysia) Lim Pek Siah (Malaysia) Chor Hooi Yee	(Malaysia) Ong Ewe Hock (Malaysia) Lim Pek Siah
Norwegian International	(Germany) Björn Joppien	(Germany) Petra Overzier	(Germany) Kristof Hopp (Germany) Ingo Kindervater	(England) Liza Parker (England) Suzanne Rayappan	(Sweden) Fredrik Bergström (Sweden) Johanna Persson
Iceland International	(Canada) Bobby Milroy	(Scotland) Susan Hughes	(England) Paul Trueman (England) Ian Palethorpe	(England) Lisa Parker (England) Suzanne Rayappan	(England) Peter Jeffrey (England) Hayley Connor
Scottish Open	(India) Arvind Bhat	(Scotland) Yuan Wemyss	(Sweden) Joakim Hansson (Sweden) Fredrik Bergström	(Poland) Kamila Augustyn (Poland) Nadieżda Kostiuczyk	(Sweden) Fredrik Bergström (Sweden) Johanna Persson
Irish Open	(Denmark) Joachim Persson	(Bulgaria) Petya Nedelcheva	(England) Ruben Gordown Khosadalina (England) Aji Basuki Sindoro	(Denmark) Pernille Harder (Denmark) Helle Nielsen	(England) Ruben Gordown Khosadalina (England) Kelly Matthews
Portugal International	(France) Arif Rasidi	(Scotland) Yuan Wemyss	(England) Anthony Clark (England) Simon Archer	(Germany) Sandra Marinello (Germany) Kathrin Piotrowski	(England) Simon Archer (England) Donna Kellogg
Swedish International	(Russia) Evgenij Isakov	(England) Elizabeth Cann	(England) Anthony Clark (England) Simon Archer	(Japan) Miyuki Tai (Japan) Noriko Okuma	(Russia) Nikolai Zuyev (Russia) Marina Yakusheva
Croatian International	(Switzerland) Holvy De Pauw	(Japan) Miyo Akao	(Denmark) Simon Mollyhus (Denmark) Anders Kristiansen	(Singapore) Frances Liu Fan (Singapore) Shinta Mulia Sari	(Singapore) Hendra Wijaya (Singapore) Frances Liu Fan
Finnish International	(Denmark) Joachim Persson	(Scotland) Susan Hughes	(Sweden) Henrik Andersson (Sweden) Fredrik Bergström	(Germany) Sandra Marinello (Germany) Kathrin Piotrowski	(Poland) Robert Mateusiak (Poland) Nadieżda Kostiuczyk
Dutch International	(Germany) Björn Joppien	(Bulgaria) Petya Nedelcheva	(Germany) Kristof Hopp (Germany) Ingo Kindervater	(Germany) Nicole Grether (Germany) Juliane Schenk	(Sweden) Fredrik Bergström (Sweden) Johanna Persson

=== Performance by countries ===
Tabulated below are the Circuit performances based on countries. Only countries who have won a title are listed:

No.	Team	BUL	CZE	SVK	HUN	NOR	ISL	SCO	IRL	POR	SWE	CRO	FIN	NLD	Total
1	England	3				1	3		2	2	2				13
2	Germany		1			3				1			1	3	9
3	Denmark		2						2			1	1		6
3	Russia			3	1						2				6
3	Sweden		1			1		2					1	1	6
6	Scotland						1	1		1			1		4
7	Bulgaria				1				1					1	3
7	Canada		1		1		1								3
7	Malaysia			1	2										3
10	Japan										1	1			2
10	Poland							1					1		2
10	Singapore											2			2
13	France									1					1
13	Iceland	1													1
13	India							1							1
13	Indonesia	1													1
13	Italy			1											1
13	Switzerland											1			1
