= Anastasia Russkikh =

Russian badminton player (born 1983)

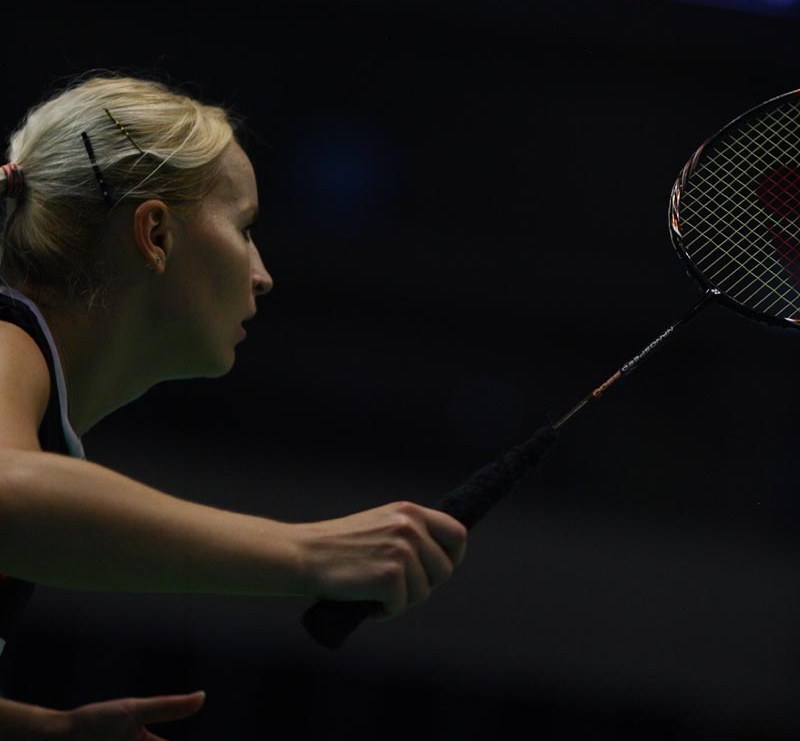
- Russkikh at the Yonex Open Japan 2009

Personal information
- Born: Anastasia Vladimirovna Russkikh; 20 May 1983 (age 43) Gatchina, Russian SFSR, USSR
- Height: 1.65 m (5 ft 5 in)

Sport
- Country: Russia
- Sport: Badminton
- Handedness: Right

Women's & mixed doubles
- Highest ranking: 3 (WD, 2 December 2010); 29 (XD, 21 January 2010)
- BWF profile
Medal record
Women's badminton
Representing Russia
European Championships
Silver medal – second place	2010 Manchester	Women's doubles
European Junior Championships
Silver medal – second place	1999 Glasgow	Mixed team
Bronze medal – third place	1999 Glasgow	Mixed doubles
Bronze medal – third place	2001 Spała	Girls' doubles
Bronze medal – third place	2001 Spała	Mixed team

Anastasia Vladimirovna Russkikh (Russian: Анастасия Владимировна Русских; born 20 May 1983) is an international badminton player from Gatchina, Russia. She entered her first tournament at age 9 in Sweden and finished in third place. She began playing professionally with her local Gatchina Badminton Club as well as a larger Danish club in Skaelskor, Denmark. In 2010, she played for the Vendsyssel Elite Badminton club. Russkikh is one of Russia's top badminton players, and is a high-ranking competitor in women's and mixed-doubles competitions. Together with her partner in women's doubles, Petya Nedelcheva from Bulgaria, she won the silver medal at the 2010 European Championships.

== Achievements ==
=== European Championships ===
Women's doubles
Year	Venue	Partner	Opponent	Score	Result
2010	Manchester Evening News Arena, Manchester, England	(Bulgaria) Petya Nedelcheva	(Russia) Valeria Sorokina (Russia) Nina Vislova	18–21, 14–21	Silver

=== European Junior Championships ===
Girls' doubles
Year	Venue	Partner	Opponent	Score	Result
2001	Spała Olympic Center, Spała, Poland	(Russia) Elena Shimko	(Poland) Kamila Augustyn (Belarus) Nadieżda Kostiuczyk	8–15, 1–15	Bronze

Mixed doubles
Year	Venue	Partner	Opponent	Score	Result
1999	Kelvin Hall, Glasgow, Scotland	(Russia) Alexey Vasiliev	(Denmark) Mathias Boe (Denmark) Karina Sørensen	4–15, 9–15	Bronze

=== BWF Superseries ===
The BWF Superseries, which was launched on 14 December 2006 and implemented in 2007, was a series of elite badminton tournaments, sanctioned by the Badminton World Federation (BWF). BWF Superseries levels were Superseries and Superseries Premier. A season of Superseries consisted of twelve tournaments around the world that had been introduced since 2011. Successful players were invited to the Superseries Finals, which were held at the end of each year.

Women's doubles
Year	Tournament	Partner	Opponent	Score	Result
2010	French Open	(Bulgaria) Petya Nedelcheva	(Thailand) Duanganong Aroonkesorn (Thailand) Kunchala Voravichitchaikul	16–21, 2–11 retired	(silver) Runner-up

Mixed doubles
Year	Tournament	Partner	Opponent	Score	Result
2010	Indonesia Open	(Indonesia) Hendra Setiawan	(Poland) Robert Mateusiak (Poland) Nadieżda Zięba	18–21, 20–22	(silver) Runner-up

BWF Super Series Finals tournament
BWF Super Series Premier tournament
BWF Super Series tournament

=== BWF Grand Prix ===
The BWF Grand Prix had two levels, the Grand Prix and Grand Prix Gold. It was a series of badminton tournaments sanctioned by the Badminton World Federation (BWF) and played between 2007 and 2017. The World Badminton Grand Prix was sanctioned by the International Badminton Federation from 1983 to 2006.

Women's doubles
Year	Tournament	Partner	Opponent	Score	Result
2001	Dutch Open	(China) Xu Huaiwen	(Denmark) Pernille Harder (Denmark) Majken Vange	3–7, 7–2, 7–0, 4–7, 7–5	(gold) Winner
2007	Dutch Open	(Russia) Ekaterina Ananina	(Russia) Valeria Sorokina (Russia) Nina Vislova	20–22, 21–15, 21–13	(gold) Winner

BWF Grand Prix Gold tournament
BWF Grand Prix tournament

=== BWF International Challenge/Series ===
Women's singles
Year	Tournament	Opponent	Score	Result
2001	Estonian International	(Finland) Elina Väisänen	11–4, 11–7	(gold) Winner

Women's doubles
Year	Tournament	Partner	Opponent	Score	Result
2000	Russian International	(Russia) Ella Karachkova	(Russia) Irina Ruslyakova (Russia) Marina Yakusheva	8–15, 10–15	(silver) Runner-up
2001	Austrian International	(Russia) Ella Karachkova	(Denmark) Britta Andersen (Denmark) Lene Mørk	12–15, 15–7, 17–16	(gold) Winner
2001	Estonian International	(Estonia) Kai-Riin Saluste	(Estonia) Kati Kraaving (Estonia) Kairi Saks	17–16, 15–3	(gold) Winner
2002	Slovenian International	(Russia) Ekaterina Ananina	(Denmark) Lena Frier Kristiansen (Denmark) Karina Sørensen	11–7, 11–5	(gold) Winner
2003	Welsh International	(Russia) Ella Karachkova	(France) Laura Choinet (France) Perrine Le Buhanic	15–1, 15–4	(gold) Winner
2004	Russian International	(Russia) Irina Ruslyakova	(Russia) Valeria Sorokina (Russia) Nina Vislova	15–2, 15–3	(gold) Winner
2004	Le Volant d'Or de Toulouse	(Bulgaria) Petya Nedelcheva	(India) Jwala Gutta (India) Shruti Kurien	15–11, 15–6	(gold) Winner
2005	Hungarian International	(Russia) Ekaterina Ananina	(Scotland) Imogen Bankier (Scotland) Emma Mason	15–4, 10–15, 15–5	(gold) Winner
2006	Finnish International	(Russia) Ekaterina Ananina	(Sweden) Emelie Lennartsson (Sweden) Sophia Hansson	21–12 retired	(gold) Winner
2006	Le Volant d'Or de Toulouse	(Russia) Ekaterina Ananina	(Russia) Valeria Sorokina (Russia) Nina Vislova	10–21, 21–18, 14–21	(silver) Runner-up
2006	Hungarian International	(Russia) Ekaterina Ananina	(Scotland) Imogen Bankier (Scotland) Emma Mason	21–18, 21–8	(gold) Winner
2007	White Nights	(Russia) Ekaterina Ananina	(Russia) Valeria Sorokina (Russia) Nina Vislova	21–15, 21–14	(gold) Winner
2007	Norwegian International	(Russia) Ekaterina Ananina	(Russia) Valeria Sorokina (Russia) Nina Vislova	21–14, 20–22, 21–13	(gold) Winner
2007	Italian International	(Russia) Ekaterina Ananina	(Russia) Valeria Sorokina (Russia) Nina Vislova	21–15, 26–24	(gold) Winner
2008	Finnish International	(Russia) Ekaterina Ananina	(Denmark) Lena Frier Kristiansen (Denmark) Kamilla Rytter Juhl	17–21, 15–21	(silver) Runner-up
2008	Dutch International	(Russia) Ekaterina Ananina	(Poland) Kamila Augustyn (Poland) Nadieżda Kostiuczyk	16–21, 21–11, 13–21	(silver) Runner-up
2008	European Circuit Finals	(Russia) Ekaterina Ananina	(Russia) Valeria Sorokina (Russia) Nina Vislova	19–21, 21–13, 21–15	(gold) Winner
2008	White Nights	(Russia) Ekaterina Ananina	(Russia) Valeria Sorokina (Russia) Nina Vislova	21–12, 21–18	(gold) Winner
2008	Norwegian International	(Russia) Irina Khlebko	(Sweden) Emelie Lennartsson (Sweden) Emma Wengberg	21–18, 21–23, 21–16	(gold) Winner
2009	White Nights	(Russia) Anastasia Prokopenko	(Russia) Valeria Sorokina (Russia) Nina Vislova	19–21, 21–13, 17–21	(silver) Runner-up
2009	Bulgarian International	(Bulgaria) Petya Nedelcheva	(Germany) Nicole Grether (Canada) Charmaine Reid	21–11, 21–18	(gold) Winner
2010	White Nights	(Bulgaria) Petya Nedelcheva	(Russia) Valeria Sorokina (Russia) Nina Vislova	17–21, 15–21	(silver) Runner-up
2010	Bulgarian International	(Bulgaria) Petya Nedelcheva	(Russia) Tatjana Bibik (Russia) Olga Golovanova	Walkover	(gold) Winner
2011	White Nights	(Russia) Irina Khlebko	(Russia) Tatjana Bibik (Russia) Olga Golovanova	21–17, 21–19	(gold) Winner

Mixed doubles
Year	Tournament	Partner	Opponent	Score	Result
1997	Baltic International	(Russia) Victor Maljutin	(Estonia) Einar Veede (Estonia) Mare Pedanik	15–10, 15–10	(gold) Winner
1999	Romanian International	(Russia) Alexandr Russkikh	(Slovenia) Andrej Pohar (Slovenia) Maja Pohar	7–15, 3–15	(silver) Runner-up
2001	Estonian International	(Russia) Alexandr Russkikh	(Russia) Mikhail Kelj (Finland) Katja Ruohonen	15–9, 15–6	(gold) Winner
2002	Slovenian International	(Russia) Alexandr Russkikh	(Canada) William Milroy (Denmark) Karina Sørensen	11–5, 11–8	(gold) Winner
2003	Slovak International	(Russia) Alexandr Russkikh	(France) Svetoslav Stoyanov (France) Victoria Wright	15–7, 15–9	(gold) Winner
2003	Welsh International	(Russia) Alexandr Russkikh	(England) Chris Langridge (England) Jenny Day	15–8, 15–5	(gold) Winner
2004	Le Volant d'Or de Toulouse	(France) Svetoslav Stoyanov	(France) Jean-Michel Lefort (France) Weny Rahmawati	15–3, 15–10	(gold) Winner
2005	Hungarian International	(Russia) Vladimir Malkov	(Denmark) Jacob Chemnitz (Denmark) Julie Houmann	15–12, 15–12	(gold) Winner
2005	Scottish International	(Denmark) Rasmus Andersen	(England) Kristian Roebuck (England) Jenny Wallwork	8–15, 14–17, 5–15	(silver) Runner-up
2006	Spanish International	(Denmark) Rasmus Andersen	(Portugal) Alexandre Paixão (Portugal) Filipa Lamy	21–19, 21–11	(gold) Winner
2006	Le Volant d'Or de Toulouse	(Russia) Alexandr Russkikh	(Russia) Vitalij Durkin (Russia) Marina Yakusheva	21–19, 21–18	(gold) Winner
2006	Hungarian International	(Russia) Vladimir Malkov	(Scotland) Watson Briggs (Scotland) Imogen Bankier	21–12, 21–17	(gold) Winner
2007	Finnish International	(Denmark) Rasmus Andersen	(Germany) Tim Dettmann (Germany) Annekatrin Lillie	21–16, 23–25, 17–21	(silver) Runner-up
2009	White Nights	(Indonesia) Flandy Limpele	(Russia) Vitalij Durkin (Russia) Nina Vislova	21–14, 25–23	(gold) Winner
2010	White Nights	(Russia) Evgenij Dremin	(Ukraine) Valeriy Atrashchenkov (Ukraine) Elena Prus	21–17, 21–14	(gold) Winner
2010	Bulgarian International	(Russia) Evgenij Dremin	(Estonia) Gert Künka (Sweden) Amanda Högström	21–14, 26–24	(gold) Winner
2010	Norwegian International	(Russia) Evgenij Dremin	(Germany) Michael Fuchs (Germany) Birgit Overzier	20–22, 10–21	(silver) Runner-up

BWF International Challenge tournament
BWF International Series tournament
BWF Future Series tournament
