= Elena Shimko =

Russian badminton player (born 1982)

Personal information
- Born: Elena Michailovna Shimko (Елена Михайловна Шимко); 22 April 1982 (age 44)

Sport
- Country: Russia
- Sport: Badminton
- Event: Doubles

Doubles
- BWF profile
Medal record
Women's badminton
Representing Russia
European Junior Championships
| Bronze medal – third place | 2001 Spała | Girls' doubles |
| Bronze medal – third place | 2001 Spała | Mixed team |

Elena Michailovna Shimko (Russian: Елена Михайловна Шимко; born 22 April 1982) is a Russian badminton player.

Shimko won six junior titles and bronze at the 2001 European Junior Championships in Russia. In 2004, she became the Russian National Champion with her partner Marina Yakusheva. Outside her home country, she was successful at the Slovenian International, Slovak International, Belgian International, and the Scottish Open, among others.

== Achievements ==
=== European Junior Championships ===
Girls' doubles
| Year | Venue | Partner | Opponent | Score | Result |
|---|---|---|---|---|---|
| 2001 | Spała Olympic Center; Spała, Poland | (Russia) Anastasia Russkikh | (Poland) Kamila Augustyn (Belarus) Nadieżda Kostiuczyk | 8–15, 1–15 | Bronze |

=== IBF/BWF International ===
Women's singles
| Year | Tournament | Opponent | Score | Result |
|---|---|---|---|---|
| 2003 | Slovenian International | (England) Jill Pittard | 11–3, 9–11, 6–11 | (silver) Runner-up |
| 2006 | Latvia International | (Ukraine) Elena Nozdran | | (silver) Runner-up |

Women's doubles
| Year | Tournament | Partner | Opponent | Score | Result |
|---|---|---|---|---|---|
| 2001 | Slovenian International | (Russia) Marina Yakusheva | (Switzerland) Fabienne Baumeyer (Switzerland) Judith Baumeyer | 7–0, 7–0, 7–0 | (gold) Winner |
| 2002 | Austrian International | (Russia) Marina Yakusheva | (Denmark) Helle Nielsen (Denmark) Lene Mørk | 4–7, 0–7, 5–7 | (silver) Runner-up |
| 2002 | Hungarian International | (Russia) Marina Yakusheva | (Russia) Elena Sukhareva (Russia) Natalia Gorodnicheva | 11–8, 11–9 | (gold) Winner |
| 2003 | French International | (Russia) Marina Yakusheva | (Japan) Miyuki Tai (Japan) Yoshiko Iwata | 1–11, 11–7, 9–11 | (silver) Runner-up |
| 2003 | Slovak International | (Russia) Marina Yakusheva | (Russia) Ekaterina Ananina (Russia) Irina Ruslyakova | 15–7, 15–13 | (gold) Winner |
| 2003 | Slovenian International | (Russia) Marina Yakusheva | (Iceland) Ragna Ingólfsdóttir (Iceland) Sara Jónsdóttir | 15–6, 15–3 | (gold) Winner |
| 2003 | Hungarian International | (Russia) Marina Yakusheva | (Poland) Kamila Augustyn (Poland) Nadieżda Kostiuczyk | 16–17, 9–15 | (silver) Runner-up |
| 2004 | Portugal International | (Russia) Marina Yakusheva | (Poland) Kamila Augustyn (Poland) Nadieżda Kostiuczyk | 6–15, 5–15 | (silver) Runner-up |
| 2006 | Belgian International | (Russia) Marina Yakusheva | (Russia) Valeria Sorokina (Russia) Nina Vislova | 21–13, 21–13 | (gold) Winner |
| 2006 | Scottish International | (Russia) Marina Yakusheva | (Russia) Valeria Sorokina (Russia) Nina Vislova | 22–20, 21–13 | (gold) Winner |
| 2007 | Czech International | (Russia) Tatjana Bibik | (Denmark) Christinna Pedersen (Denmark) Mie Schjøtt-Kristensen | 11–21, 20–22 | (silver) Runner-up |
| 2007 | Slovak International | (Russia) Tatjana Bibik | (Russia) Elena Chernyavskya (Russia) Anastasia Prokopenko | Walkover | (gold) Winner |

Mixed doubles
| Year | Tournament | Partner | Opponent | Score | Result |
|---|---|---|---|---|---|
| 2002 | Finnish International | (Russia) Sergey Ivlev | (Bulgaria) Konstantin Dobrev (Bulgaria) Petya Nedelcheva | 7–3, 8–6, 0–7, 7–8, 4–7 | (silver) Runner-up |
| 2007 | Slovak International | (Russia) Andrey Ashmarin | (Russia) Elena Chernyavskya (Russia) Anton Nazarenko | 11–21, 19–21 | (silver) Runner-up |
