= Sergey Ivlev (badminton) =

Russian badminton player (born 1983)

Personal information
- Born: Sergey Nikolaevich Ivlev (Сергей Николаевич Ивлев); 29 October 1983 (age 43)

Sport
- Country: Russia
- Sport: Badminton
- Event: Men's singles & doubles

Men's singles & doubles
- BWF profile
Medal record
Men's badminton
Representing Russia
European Junior Championships
Bronze medal – third place	2001 Spała	Boys' singles
Bronze medal – third place	2001 Spała	Mixed team

Sergey Nikolaevich Ivlev (Russian: Сергей Николаевич Ивлев; born 29 October 1983) is a Russian badminton player. He was the Russian National Champions in the men's singles in 2006.

== Career ==
Ivlev played the 2007 BWF World Championships in the men's singles, and was defeated in the first round by Eric Pang, of the Netherlands, 15–21, 6–21. In his home country Russia he won one national title in 2006.

== Achievements ==
=== European Junior Championships ===
Boys' singles
Year	Venue	Opponent	Score	Result
2001	Spała Olympic Center; Spała, Poland	(Germany) Joachim Persson	11–15, 9–15	Bronze

=== IBF World Grand Prix ===
The World Badminton Grand Prix was sanctioned by the International Badminton Federation from 1983 to 2006.

Mixed doubles
Year	Tournament	Partner	Opponent	Score	Result
2006	U.S. Open	(Russia) Nina Vislova	(Russia) Vitalij Durkin (Russia) Valeria Sorokina	15–21, 21–15, 21–16	(gold) Winner

=== IBF International ===
Men's singles
Year	Tournament	Opponent	Score	Result
2006	Bulgarian International	(Denmark) Michael Christensen	13–21, 21–17, 23–21	(gold) Winner

Men's doubles
Year	Tournament	Partner	Opponent	Score	Result
2004	Finnish International	(Russia) Evgenij Isakov	(Sweden) Imanuel Hirschfeldt (Sweden) Jörgen Olsson	5–15, 15–8, 15–4	(gold) Winner
2004	Slovak International	(Russia) Nikolai Zuyev	(Sweden) Imanuel Hirschfeldt (Sweden) Jörgen Olsson	15–13, 6–15, 15–7	(gold) Winner
2004	Hungarian International	(Russia) Nikolai Zuyev	(Wales) Matthew Hughes (Wales) Martyn Lewis	15–3, 15–2	(gold) Winner

Mixed doubles
Year	Tournament	Partner	Opponent	Score	Result
2002	Finnish International	(Russia) Elena Shimko	(Bulgaria) Konstantin Dobrev (Bulgaria) Petya Nedelcheva	7–3, 8–6, 0–7, 7–8, 4–7	(silver) Runner-up
2002	Hungarian International	(Russia) Natalia Gorodnicheva	(Russia) Nikolai Zuyev (Russia) Marina Yakusheva	5–11, 11–8, 11–7	(gold) Winner
