= Ekaterina Ananina =

Russian badminton player (born 1982)

Personal information
- Born: 31 January 1982 (age 44) Perm, Soviet Union
- Height: 1.70 m (5 ft 7 in)
- Weight: 65 kg (143 lb; 10.2 st)

Sport
- Country: Russia
- Sport: Badminton
- Event: Women's singles & doubles

Women's singles & doubles
- BWF profile
Medal record
Women's badminton
Representing Russia
European Junior Championships
Bronze medal – third place	2001 Spała	Mixed team

Ekaterina Sergeevna Ananina (Russian: Екатерина Сергеевна Ананина; born 31 January 1982) is a Russian badminton player. She was the women's doubles champion at the National Championships in 2002 and 2009. Now, she is known as Ekaterina Vikulova. Ananina was prepared to compete at the Beijing 2008 Olympic Games, but she was failed to qualified.

== Achievements ==
=== BWF Grand Prix ===
The BWF Grand Prix had two levels, the Grand Prix and Grand Prix Gold. It was a series of badminton tournaments sanctioned by the Badminton World Federation (BWF) and played between 2007 and 2017. The World Badminton Grand Prix was sanctioned by the International Badminton Federation from 1983 to 2006.

Women's doubles
Year	Tournament	Partner	Opponent	Score	Result
2005	Russian Open	(Russia) Anna Larchenko	(Russia) Valeria Sorokina (Russia) Nina Vislova	11–15, 8–15	(silver) Runner-up
2007	Dutch Open	(Russia) Anastasia Russkikh	(Russia) Valeria Sorokina (Russia) Nina Vislova	20–22, 21–15, 21–13	(gold) Winner

BWF Grand Prix Gold tournament
BWF Grand Prix tournament

=== BWF International Challenge/Series ===
Women's singles
Year	Tournament	Opponent	Score	Result
2006	Le Volant d'Or de Toulouse	(Russia) Ella Karachkova	21–23, 16–21	(silver) Runner-up

Women's doubles
Year	Tournament	Partner	Opponent	Score	Result
2002	Slovenian International	(Russia) Anastasia Russkikh	(Denmark) Lena Frier Kristiansen (Denmark) Karina Sørensen	11–7, 11–5	(gold) Winner
2003	Austrian International	(Russia) Irina Ruslyakova	(Russia) Natalia Gorodnicheva (Russia) Elena Sukhareva	11–8, 7–11, 11–5	(gold) Winner
2003	Slovak International	(Russia) Irina Ruslyakova	(Russia) Elena Shimko (Russia) Marina Yakusheva	7–15, 13–15	(silver) Runner-up
2005	Hungarian International	(Russia) Anastasia Russkikh	(Scotland) Imogen Bankier (Scotland) Emma Mason	15–4, 10–15, 15–5	(gold) Winner
2006	Finnish International	(Russia) Anastasia Russkikh	(Sweden) Emelie Lennartsson (Sweden) Sophia Hansson	21–12 retired	(gold) Winner
2006	Le Volant d'Or de Toulouse	(Russia) Anastasia Russkikh	(Russia) Valeria Sorokina (Russia) Nina Vislova	10–21, 21–18, 14–21	(silver) Runner-up
2006	Hungarian International	(Russia) Anastasia Russkikh	(Scotland) Imogen Bankier (Scotland) Emma Mason	21–18, 21–8	(gold) Winner
2007	White Nights	(Russia) Anastasia Russkikh	(Russia) Valeria Sorokina (Russia) Nina Vislova	21–15, 21–14	(gold) Winner
2007	Norwegian International	(Russia) Anastasia Russkikh	(Russia) Valeria Sorokina (Russia) Nina Vislova	21–14, 20–22, 21–13	(gold) Winner
2007	Italian International	(Russia) Anastasia Russkikh	(Russia) Valeria Sorokina (Russia) Nina Vislova	21–15, 26–24	(gold) Winner
2008	Finnish International	(Russia) Anastasia Russkikh	(Denmark) Lena Frier Kristiansen (Denmark) Kamilla Rytter Juhl	17–21, 15–21	(silver) Runner-up
2008	Dutch International	(Russia) Anastasia Russkikh	(Poland) Kamila Augustyn (Poland) Nadieżda Kostiuczyk	16–21, 21–11, 13–21	(silver) Runner-up
2008	European Circuit Finals	(Russia) Anastasia Russkikh	(Russia) Valeria Sorokina (Russia) Nina Vislova	19–21, 21–13, 21–15	(gold) Winner
2008	White Nights	(Russia) Anastasia Russkikh	(Russia) Valeria Sorokina (Russia) Nina Vislova	21–12, 21–18	(gold) Winner

BWF International Challenge tournament
BWF International Series tournament
BWF Future Series tournament
