= Eric Pang =

Former Dutch badminton player

Eric Pang 方发财
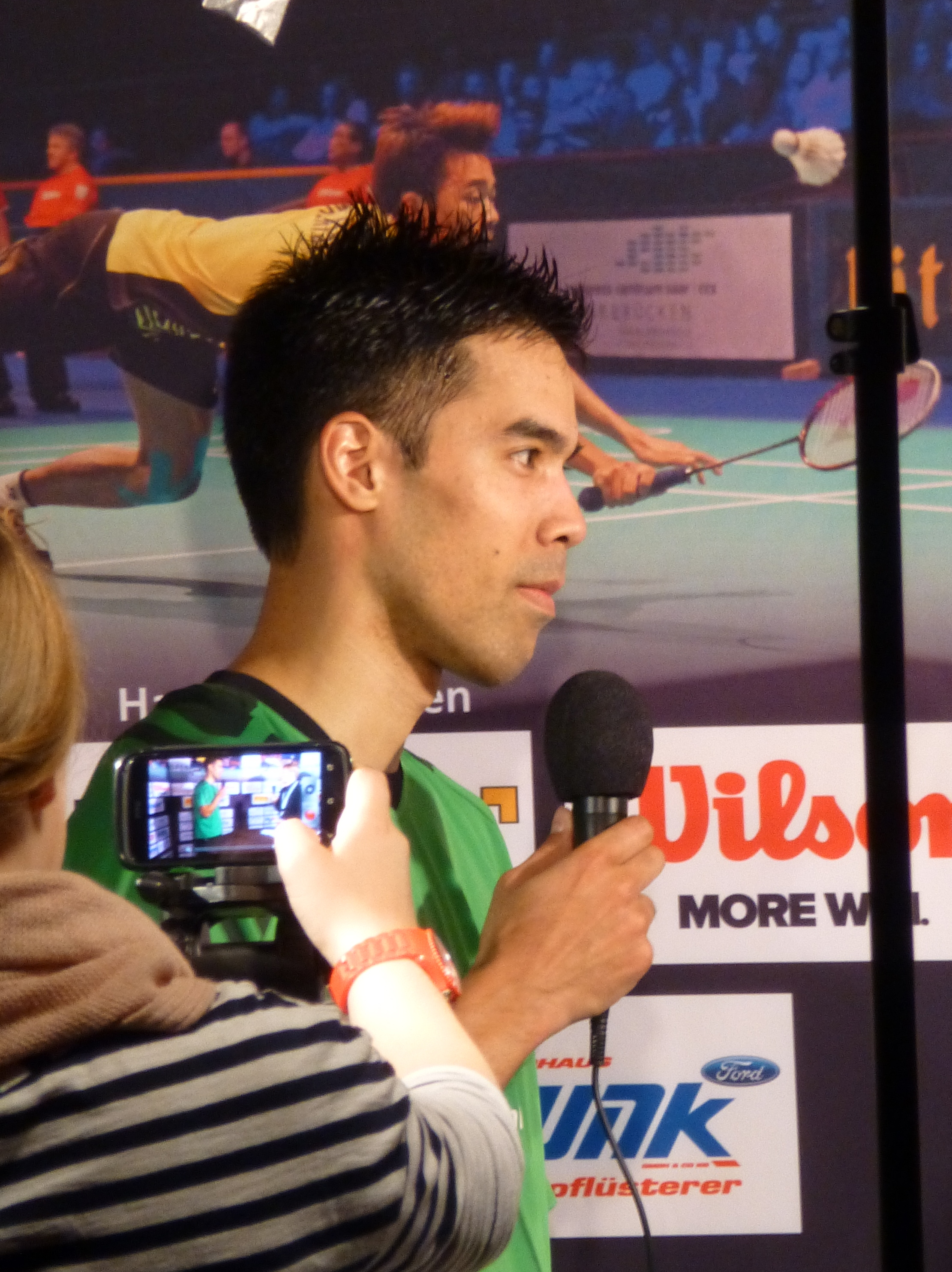

Personal information
- Born: 30 January 1982 (age 44) Groningen, Netherlands
- Height: 1.87 m (6 ft 2 in)
- Weight: 79 kg (174 lb; 12.4 st)

Sport
- Country: Netherlands
- Sport: Badminton
- Handedness: Right

Men's singles
- Highest ranking: 22 (10 October 2009)
- BWF profile
Medal record
Men's badminton
Representing Netherlands
European Mixed Team Championships
Silver medal – second place	2004 Geneva	Mixed team
Silver medal – second place	2006 Den Bosch	Mixed team
European Junior Championships
Gold medal – first place	2001 Spała	Boys' singles
Silver medal – second place	1999 Glasgow	Boys' singles

Eric Pang (born 30 January 1982) is a Dutch badminton player, who became European Junior Champion in 2001. He won the National Dutch Championships seven times between 2009 and 2015.

== Career ==
As a part of the BC Amersfoort team, Pang reached the final of the European Cup 2007 held in Amersfoort. Together with Lotte Bruil-Jonathans, Yao Jie, Larisa Griga, Dicky Palyama and Chris Bruil. The final was lost against the team of NL Primorje. In the semi-finals they were too strong for CB Rinconada.

Eric Pang won the Norwegian International in 2005, the Spanish Open in 2010, the Canadian International in 2013 and the Croatian International in 2015. In 2012 Eric Pang won the Yonex Dutch Open Grand Prix beating his compatriot Dicky Palyama in the final with straight games. After his retirement in 2015 he became a coach at the Dutch National junior squad and also a juniors talent coach in Almere for a short period of time. Then he moved to China with his wife Yao Jie to open a badminton school there. When they returned to Europe the couple settled in Hamburg, Germany where they are part of the Trainers staff at the Hamburger Badminton Verband, one of Germany's National Badminton Centre's.

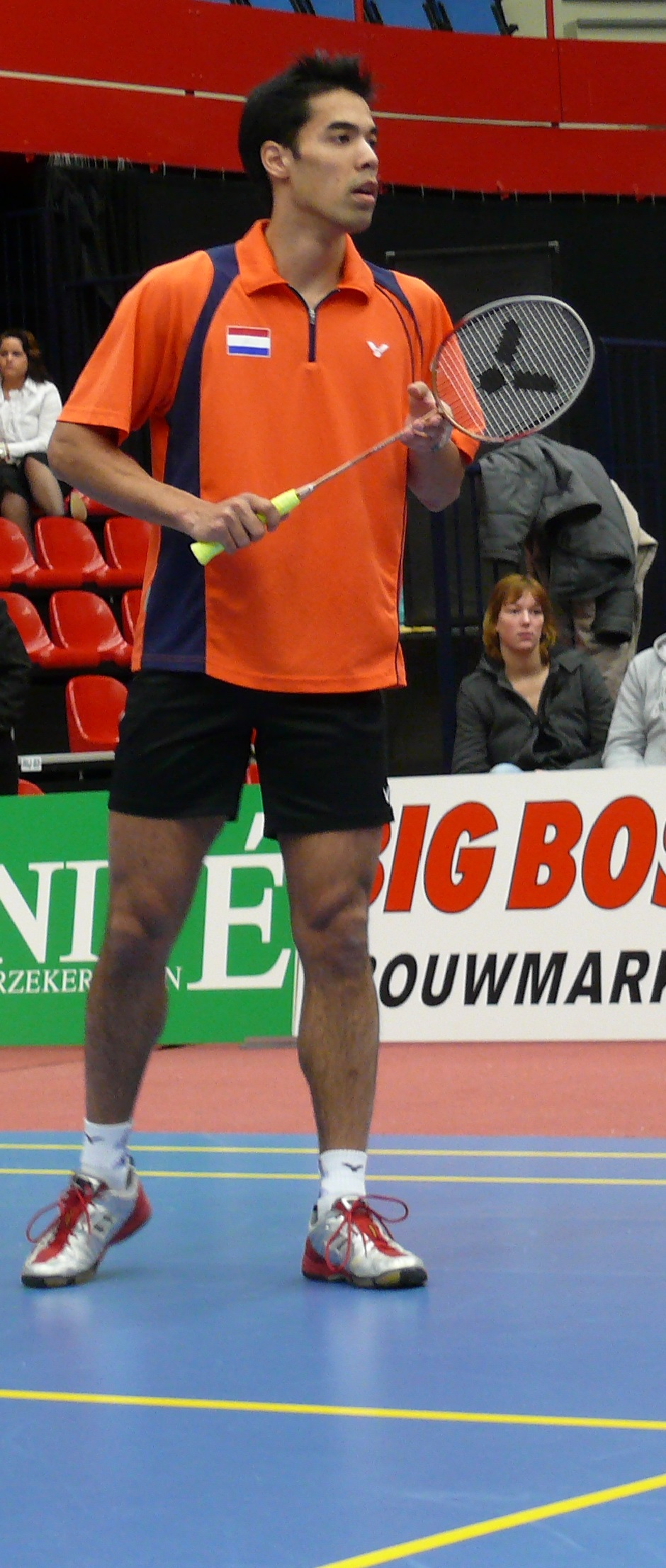
Eric Pang at the 2007 Dutch National Championships

== Personal life ==
Eric Pang was born to a Chinese Singaporean father and Dutch mother. His Chinese name is Fang Facai (Chinese: 方发财). He married Yao Jie in 2009, who later also became his coach.

== Achievements ==
=== European Junior Championships ===
Boys' singles
Year	Venue	Opponent	Score	Result
1999	Kelvin Hall; Glasgow, Scotland	(Germany) Björn Joppien	8–15, 10–15	Silver
2001	Spała Olympic Center; Spała, Poland	(Germany) Joachim Persson	15–3, 15–3	Gold

=== BWF Grand Prix (1 title, 3 runners-up) ===
The BWF Grand Prix had two levels, the Grand Prix and Grand Prix Gold. It was a series of badminton tournaments sanctioned by the Badminton World Federation (BWF) and played between 2007 and 2017.

Men's singles
Year	Tournament	Opponent	Score	Result
2009	Bitburger Open	(Denmark) Jan Ø. Jørgensen	21–12, 13–21, 15–21	(silver) Runner-up
2009	Dutch Open	(Netherlands) Chetan Anand	12–21, 15–21	(silver) Runner-up
2012	Dutch Open	(Netherlands) Dicky Palyama	21–14, 21–10	(gold) Winner
2013	Canada Open	(Malaysia) Tan Chun Seang	21–15, 11–21, 16–21	(silver) Runner-up

BWF Grand Prix tournament
BWF Grand Prix Gold tournament

=== BWF International Challenge/Series (4 titles, 11 runners-up) ===
Men's singles
Year	Tournament	Opponent	Score	Result
2003	Dutch International	(France) Arief Rasidi	11–15, 13–15	(silver) Runner-up
2005	SCBA International	(Japan) Yuichi Ikeda	13–15, 12–15	(silver) Runner-up
2005	Norwegian International	(Denmark) Kasper Ødum	15–7, 7–15, 15–10	(gold) Winner
2005	Irish International	(India) Chetan Anand	15–8, 6–15, 7–15	(silver) Runner-up
2009	Dutch International	(Netherlands) Dicky Palyama	11–21, 21–14, 15–21	(silver) Runner-up
2010	Spanish Open	(Denmark) Rune Ulsing	21–12, 21–19	(gold) Winner
2010	Belgian International	(Germany) Marc Zwiebler	15–21, 17–21	(silver) Runner-up
2010	Bahrain International	(Indonesia) Tommy Sugiarto	17–21, 9–21	(silver) Runner-up
2010	Turkey International	(Poland) Przemysław Wacha	18–21, 17–21	(silver) Runner-up
2012	Swedish Masters	(Hong Kong) Chan Yan Kit	17–21, 19–21	(silver) Runner-up
2013	Swedish Masters	(Japan) Kento Momota	9–21, 21–16, 18–21	(silver) Runner-up
2013	Dutch International	(Denmark) Viktor Axelsen	22–24, 12–21	(silver) Runner-up
2013	Canadian International	(Denmark) Joachim Persson	24–22, 21–16	(gold) Winner
2013	Belgian International	(Indonesia) Andre Kurniawan Tedjono	17–21, 11–21	(silver) Runner-up
2015	Croatian International	(Netherlands) Nick Fransman	21–16, 21–12	(gold) Winner

BWF International Challenge tournament
BWF International Series tournament
