= 2001 European Junior Badminton Championships =

Tournament details
- Dates: 7–14 April 2001
- Venue: Spała Olympic Center
- Location: Spała, Poland

The 2001 European Junior Badminton Championships were the 17th tournament of the European Junior Badminton Championships. They were held in Spała, Poland, from 7–14 April 2001.

== Medalists ==
| Event | Gold | Silver | Bronze |
|---|---|---|---|
| Boys' singles | (Netherlands) Eric Pang | (Germany) Joachim Persson | (Sweden) Gustav Ihrlund |
| Boys' singles | (Netherlands) Eric Pang | (Germany) Joachim Persson | (Russia) Sergey Ivlev |
| Girls' singles | (Germany) Juliane Schenk | (Poland) Kamila Augustyn | (Germany) Petra Overzier |
| Girls' singles | (Germany) Juliane Schenk | (Poland) Kamila Augustyn | (Bulgaria) Petya Nedelcheva |
| Boys' doubles | (Denmark) Rasmus Andersen (Denmark) Carsten Mogensen | (Denmark) Peter Hasbak (Denmark) Rune Ulsing | (Germany) Jan Junker (Germany) Marc Zwiebler |
| Boys' doubles | (Denmark) Rasmus Andersen (Denmark) Carsten Mogensen | (Denmark) Peter Hasbak (Denmark) Rune Ulsing | (England) James Boxall (England) Steven Higgins |
| Girls' doubles | (Poland) Kamila Augustyn (Belarus) Nadieżda Kostiuczyk | (Germany) Carina Mette (Germany) Juliane Schenk | (Russia) Anastasia Russkikh (Russia) Elena Shimko |
| Girls' doubles | (Poland) Kamila Augustyn (Belarus) Nadieżda Kostiuczyk | (Germany) Carina Mette (Germany) Juliane Schenk | (Bulgaria) Maya Ivanova (Bulgaria) Petya Nedelcheva |
| Mixed doubles | (Denmark) Rasmus Andersen (Denmark) Mette Nielsen | (Denmark) Carsten Mogensen (Denmark) Kamilla Rytter Juhl | (Denmark) Peter Hasbak (Denmark) Lena Frier Kristiansen |
| Mixed doubles | (Denmark) Rasmus Andersen (Denmark) Mette Nielsen | (Denmark) Carsten Mogensen (Denmark) Kamilla Rytter Juhl | (Germany) Marc Zwiebler (Germany) Birgit Overzier |
| Teams | Germany; Tim Dettmann; Raphael Groß; Jan Junker; Philipp Knoll; Joachim Persson; Marc Zwiebler; Monja Bölter; Sandra Marinello; Carina Mette; Birgit Overzier; Petra Overzier; Juliane Schenk | Denmark; Rasmus Andersen; Peter Hasbak; Jens-Kristian Leth; Carsten Mogensen; Rune Ulsing; Lena Frier Kristiansen; Mette Nielsen; Mie Nielsen; Amalie Dynnes Ørsted; Kamilla Rytter Juhl | Russia; Sergey Ivlev; Dmitry Kazakov; Sergey Lunev; Anton Nazarenko; Dimitri Pankov; Alexander Schepalkin; Ekaterina Ananina; Tatjana Bibik; Maria Kazakova; Anastasia Russkikh; Elena Shimko; Valeria Sorokina; Nina Vislova |

== Boys' singles ==
=== Seeds ===
1. (Netherlands) Eric Pang (champion)
2. (Denmark) Jens-Kristian Leth (quarterfinals)
3/4. (Germany) Joachim Persson (final)
3/4. (England) Nathan Rice (quarterfinals)

5/8. (Russia) Sergey Ivlev (semifinals)
5/8. (Denmark) Rune Ulsing (second round)
5/8. (Netherlands) Gijs van Heijster (quarterfinals)
5/8. (Germany) Marc Zwiebler (quarterfinals)

=== Finals ===
Quarterfinals
1 | (Netherlands) Eric Pang | 15 | 15
5/8 | (Germany) Marc Zwiebler | 12 | 4
3/4 | (England) Nathan Rice | 7 | 12
(Sweden) Gustav Ihrlund | 15 | 15
5/8 | (Netherlands) Gijs van Heijster | 10 | 7
3/4 | (Germany) Joachim Persson | 15 | 15
5/8 | (Russia) Sergey Ivlev | 15 | 15
2 | (Denmark) Jens-Kristian Leth | 12 | 9

Semifinals
1 | (Netherlands) Eric Pang | 15 | 15
(Sweden) Gustav Ihrlund | 2 | 3
3/4 | (Germany) Joachim Persson | 15 | 15
5/8 | (Russia) Sergey Ivlev | 11 | 9

Final
1 | (Netherlands) Eric Pang | 15 | 15
3/4 | (Germany) Joachim Persson | 3 | 3

== Girls' singles ==
=== Seeds ===
1. (Germany) Petra Overzier (semifinals)
2. (Germany) Juliane Schenk (champion)
3/4. (Poland) Kamila Augustyn (final)
3/4. (Bulgaria) Petya Nedelcheva (semifinals)

5/8. (Belarus) Nadieżda Kostiuczyk (quarterfinals)
5/8. (Denmark) Mie Nielsen (second round)
5/8. (Denmark) Amalie Dynnes Ørsted (quarterfinals)
5/8. (Russia) Anastasia Russkikh (quarterfinals)

=== Finals ===
Quarterfinals
1 | (Germany) Petra Overzier | 11 | 11
5/8 | (Belarus) Nadieżda Kostiuczyk | 4 | 1
3/4 | (Poland) Kamila Augustyn | 11 | 11
(Scotland) Susan Hughes | 5 | 8
5/8 | (Russia) Anastasia Russkikh | 9 | 5
3/4 | (Bulgaria) Petya Nedelcheva | 11 | 11
5/8 | (Denmark) Amalie Dynnes Ørsted | 12 | 11 | 2
2 | (Germany) Juliane Schenk | 13 | 7 | 11

Semifinals
1 | (Germany) Petra Overzier | 11 | 5 | 2
3/4 | (Poland) Kamila Augustyn | 4 | 11 | 11
3/4 | (Bulgaria) Petya Nedelcheva | 4 | 5
2 | (Germany) Juliane Schenk | 11 | 11

Final
3/4 | (Poland) Kamila Augustyn | 2 | 9
2 | (Germany) Juliane Schenk | 11 | 11

== Boys' doubles ==
=== Seeds ===
1. (Denmark) Rasmus Andersen / Carsten Mogensen (champion)
2. (England) James Boxall / Steven Higgins (semifinals)
3/4. (France) Erwin Kehlhoffner / Maxime Siegle (quarterfinals)
3/4. (Germany) Jan Junker / Marc Zwiebler (semifinals)

5/8. (Denmark) Peter Hasbak / Rune Ulsing (final)
5/8. (Finland) Tuomas Karhula / Petri Hyyryläinen (quarterfinals)
5/8. (Netherlands) Youri Lapré / Gijs van Heijster (quarterfinals)
5/8. (Russia) Sergey Ivlev / Sergey Lunev (quarterfinals)

=== Finals ===
First Round
1 | (Denmark) Rasmus Andersen (Denmark) Carsten Mogensen | 15 | 13 | 17
5/8 | (Netherlands) Youri Lapré (Netherlands) Gijs van Heijster | 9 | 15 | 14
3/4 | (Germany) Jan Junker (Germany) Marc Zwiebler | 15 | 8 | 15
5/8 | (Russia) Sergey Ivlev (Russia) Sergey Lunev | 13 | 15 | 5
5/8 | (Denmark) Peter Hasbak (Denmark) Rune Ulsing | 15 | 15
3/4 | (France) Erwin Kehlhoffner (France) Maxime Siegle | 11 | 12
5/8 | (Finland) Tuomas Karhula (Finland) Petri Hyyryläinen | 11 | 13
2 | (England) James Boxall (England) Steven Higgins | 15 | 15

Second Round
1 | (Denmark) Rasmus Andersen (Denmark) Carsten Mogensen | 15 | 15
3/4 | (Germany) Jan Junker (Germany) Marc Zwiebler | 12 | 3
5/8 | (Denmark) Peter Hasbak (Denmark) Rune Ulsing | 15 | 15
2 | (England) James Boxall (England) Steven Higgins | 12 | 13

Quarterfinals
1 | (Denmark) Rasmus Andersen (Denmark) Carsten Mogensen | 15 | 15
5/8 | (Denmark) Peter Hasbak (Denmark) Rune Ulsing | 9 | 11

== Girls' doubles ==
=== Seeds ===
1. (Poland) Kamila Augustyn / (Belarus) Nadieżda Kostiuczyk (champion)
2. (Germany) Carina Mette / Juliane Schenk (final)
3/4. (Denmark) Mie Nielsen / Amalie Dynnes Ørsted (quarterfinals)
3/4. (Russia) Anastasia Russkikh / Elena Shimko (semifinals)

5/8. (Bulgaria) Maya Ivanova / Petya Nedelcheva (semifinals)
5/8. (Denmark) Lena Frier Kristiansen / Kamilla Rytter Juhl (third round)
5/8. (Germany) Birgit Overzier / Petra Overzier (quarterfinals)
5/8. (Poland) Agnieszka Jaskuła / Paulina Matusewicz (quarterfinals)

=== Finals ===
First Round
1 | (Poland) Kamila Augustyn (Belarus) Nadieżda Kostiuczyk | 15 | 17
5/8 | (Germany) Birgit Overzier (Germany) Petra Overzier | 8 | 14
3/4 | (Russia) Anastasia Russkikh (Russia) Elena Shimko | 15 | 15
(Sweden) Elin Bergblom (Sweden) Sophia Hansson | 1 | 6
5/8 | (Bulgaria) Maya Ivanova (Bulgaria) Petya Nedelcheva | 15 | 17
3/4 | (Denmark) Mie Nielsen (Denmark) Amalie Dynnes Ørsted | 9 | 15
5/8 | (Poland) Agnieszka Jaskuła (Poland) Paulina Matusewicz | 15 | 9 | 12
2 | (Germany) Carina Mette (Germany) Juliane Schenk | 5 | 15 | 15

Second Round
1 | (Poland) Kamila Augustyn (Belarus) Nadieżda Kostiuczyk | 15 | 15
3/4 | (Russia) Anastasia Russkikh (Russia) Elena Shimko | 8 | 1
5/8 | (Bulgaria) Maya Ivanova (Bulgaria) Petya Nedelcheva | 15 | 9 | 7
2 | (Germany) Carina Mette (Germany) Juliane Schenk | 9 | 15 | 15

Quarterfinals
1 | (Poland) Kamila Augustyn (Belarus) Nadieżda Kostiuczyk | 15 | 15
2 | (Germany) Carina Mette (Germany) Juliane Schenk | 2 | 7

== Mixed doubles ==
=== Seeds ===
1. (Denmark) Rasmus Andersen / Mette Nielsen (champion)
2. (Germany) Marc Zwiebler / Birgit Overzier (semifinals)
3/4. (Denmark) Carsten Mogensen / Kamilla Rytter Juhl (final)
3/4. (Russia) Sergey Lunev / Anastasia Russkikh (quarterfinals)

5/8. (England) James Boxall / Katie Litherland (quarterfinals)
5/8. (France) Erwin Kehlhoffner / Perrine Le Buhanic (withdrawn)
5/8. (Netherlands) Youri Lapré / Silvana de Boer (quarterfinals)
5/8. (Poland) Paweł Lenkiewicz / (Belarus) Nadieżda Kostiuczyk (third round)

=== Finals ===
First Round
1 | (Denmark) Rasmus Andersen (Denmark) Mette Nielsen | 15 | 15
(England) Chris Tonks (England) Elaine Foy | 4 | 11
3/4 | (Russia) Sergey Lunev (Russia) Anastasia Russkikh | 6 | 11
(Denmark) Peter Hasbak (Denmark) Lena Frier Kristiansen | 15 | 15
5/8 | (England) James Boxall (England) Katie Litherland | 15 | 8 | 8
3/4 | (Denmark) Carsten Mogensen (Denmark) Kamilla Rytter Juhl | 12 | 15 | 15
5/8 | (Netherlands) Youri Lapré (Netherlands) Silvana de Boer | 12 | 11
2 | (Germany) Marc Zwiebler (Germany) Birgit Overzier | 15 | 15

Second Round
1 | (Denmark) Rasmus Andersen (Denmark) Mette Nielsen | 15 | 15
(Denmark) Peter Hasbak (Denmark) Lena Frier Kristiansen | 10 | 5
3/4 | (Denmark) Carsten Mogensen (Denmark) Kamilla Rytter Juhl | 15 | 12 | 15
2 | (Germany) Marc Zwiebler (Germany) Birgit Overzier | 6 | 15 | 6

Quarterfinals
1 | (Denmark) Rasmus Andersen (Denmark) Mette Nielsen | 8 | 15 | 17
3/4 | (Denmark) Carsten Mogensen (Denmark) Kamilla Rytter Juhl | 15 | 9 | 15
