= Valeria Sorokina =

Russian badminton player (born 1984)

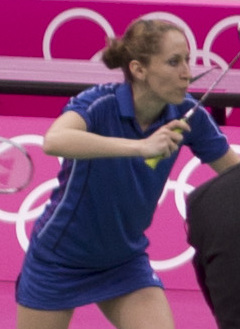

Personal information
- Born: Валерия Михайловна Сорокина; Valeria Mihailovna Sorokina; 29 March 1984 (age 42) Reshetikha, Gorky Oblast, Russian SFSR, Soviet Union
- Height: 1.72 m (5 ft 8 in)

Sport
- Country: Russia
- Sport: Badminton

Women's & mixed doubles
- Highest ranking: 4 (WD with Nina Vislova, 6 January 2011); 11 (XD with Aleksandr Nikolaenko, 29 March 2012)
- BWF profile
Medal record
Women's Badminton
Representing Russia
Olympic Games
Bronze medal – third place	2012 London	Women's doubles
European Championships
Gold medal – first place	2010 Manchester	Women's doubles
Bronze medal – third place	2008 Herning	Women's doubles
Bronze medal – third place	2012 Karlskrona	Women's doubles
European Women's Team Championships
Silver medal – second place	2010 Warsaw	Women's team
European Junior Championships
Gold medal – first place	2003 Esbjerg	Girls' doubles
Bronze medal – third place	2001 Spała	Mixed team
Bronze medal – third place	2003 Esbjerg	Mixed doubles
Bronze medal – third place	2003 Esbjerg	Mixed team

Valeria Mihailovna Sorokina (Russian: Валерия Михайловна Сорокина; born 29 March 1984) is a Russian badminton player. She specialized in both the women's and mixed doubles, achieving her career-high ranking of world number 4 in women's doubles in early 2011. Her most significant career milestone occurred at the 2012 London Olympics, where she and her longtime partner, Nina Vislova, captured the bronze medal in the women's doubles. The duo became the only Russian Olympic medalist in badminton.

Sorokina was a dominant force in European badminton for over a decade. Her journey began with a stellar performance at the 2003 European Junior Championships, where she won the gold medal in girls' doubles and two bronze medals in mixed doubles and the team event. This excellence translated to the senior level, where she secured the gold medal at the 2010 European Championships and earned multiple bronze medals in the same competition in 2008 and 2012. Throughout her career, she also claimed several titles on the BWF Grand Prix circuit, including multiple wins at the Russian Open and the Dutch Open alongside partners such as Nina Vislova and Aleksandr Nikolaenko; as well amassed a remarkable total of nine titles at the Russian National Championships. Her contributions to the sport have solidified her legacy as one of Russia's most successful and was awarded the second class of the Medal of the Order "For Merit to the Fatherland".

== Career ==
Sorokina won the gold medal at the 2010 European Badminton Championships and bronze medals in 2008 and 2012 in the women's doubles with Nina Vislova. In her home country, she won seven national titles before 2013.

== Achievements ==
=== Olympic Games ===
She played in women's doubles discipline with Nina Vislova and finished in third place after winning bronze medal match against Canadian women's doubles players, Bruce and Li with 21–9, 21–10.

Women's doubles
Year	Venue	Partner	Opponent	Score	Result
2012	Wembley Arena, London, Great Britain	(Russia) Nina Vislova	(Canada) Alex Bruce (Canada) Michelle Li	21–9, 21–10	Bronze

=== European Championships ===
Women's doubles
Year	Venue	Partner	Opponent	Score	Result
2008	Messecenter, Herning, Denmark	(Russia) Nina Vislova	(Denmark) Lena Frier Kristiansen (Denmark) Kamilla Rytter Juhl	19–21, 20–22	Bronze
2010	Manchester Evening News Arena, Manchester, England	(Russia) Nina Vislova	(Bulgaria) Petya Nedelcheva (Russia) Anastasia Russkikh	21–18, 21–14	Gold
2012	Telenor Arena, Karlskrona, Sweden	(Russia) Nina Vislova	(Denmark) Line Damkjær Kruse (Denmark) Marie Røpke	20–22, 21–13, 12–21	Bronze

=== European Junior Championships ===
Girls' doubles
Year	Venue	Partner	Opponent	Score	Result	Ref.
2003	Esbjerg Badminton Center, Esbjerg, Denmark	(Russia) Nina Vislova	(Germany) Therésè Nawrath (Germany) Birgit Overzier	5–11, 11–5, 11–0	Gold	

Mixed doubles
Year	Venue	Partner	Opponent	Score	Result	Ref.
2003	Esbjerg Badminton Center, Esbjerg, Denmark	(Russia) Anton Nazarenko	(Germany) Marc Zwiebler (Germany) Birgit Overzier	9–11, 9–11	Bronze	

=== BWF Grand Prix ===
The BWF Grand Prix had two levels, the Grand Prix and Grand Prix Gold. It was a series of badminton tournaments sanctioned by the Badminton World Federation (BWF) and played between 2007 and 2017. The World Badminton Grand Prix was sanctioned by the International Badminton Federation from 1983 to 2006.

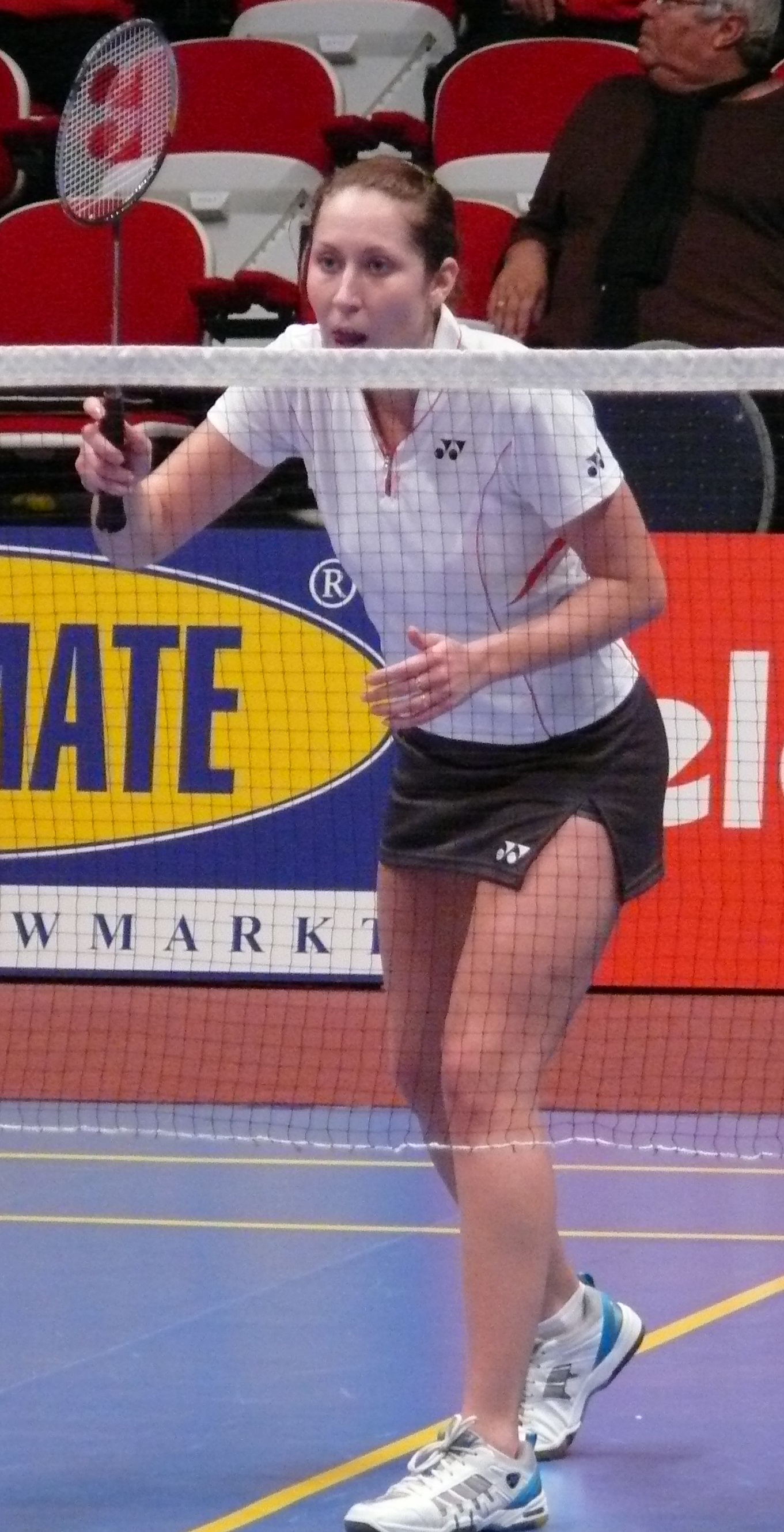
Sorokina at 2007 Dutch Open

Women's doubles
Year	Tournament	Partner	Opponent	Score	Result
2005	Russian Open	(Russia) Nina Vislova	(Russia) Ekaterina Ananina (Russia) Anna Larchenko	15–11, 15–8	(gold) Winner
2006	U.S. Open	(Russia) Nina Vislova	(Russia) Ella Karachkova (Russia) Marina Yakusheva	21–15, 21–18	(gold) Winner
2006	Bulgaria Open	(Russia) Nina Vislova	(Indonesia) Meiliana Jauhari (Indonesia) Purwati	10–21, 9–21	(silver) Runner-up
2007	Dutch Open	(Russia) Nina Vislova	(Russia) Ekaterina Ananina (Russia) Anastasia Russkikh	22–20, 15–21, 13–21	(silver) Runner-up
2008	Russian Open	(Russia) Nina Vislova	(Bulgaria) Petya Nedelcheva (Bulgaria) Dimitria Popstoikova	21–18, 21–8	(gold) Winner
2009	Russian Open	(Russia) Nina Vislova	(Russia) Tatjana Bibik (Russia) Olga Golovanova	21–8, 22–20	(gold) Winner
2009	Dutch Open	(Russia) Nina Vislova	(Germany) Sandra Marinello (Germany) Birgit Overzier	21–13, 21–17	(gold) Winner
2010	Russian Open	(Russia) Nina Vislova	(Japan) Yuriko Miki (Japan) Koharu Yonemoto	21–18, 21–18	(gold) Winner
2010	Dutch Open	(Russia) Nina Vislova	(Japan) Mizuki Fujii (Japan) Reika Kakiiwa	21–19, 21–19	(gold) Winner
2011	Russian Open	(Russia) Nina Vislova	(Japan) Misaki Matsutomo (Japan) Ayaka Takahashi	22–20, 21–18	(gold) Winner
2012	Russian Open	(Russia) Nina Vislova	(Russia) Tatjana Bibik (Russia) Anastasia Chervaykova	Walkover	(gold) Winner
2012	U.S. Open	(Russia) Nina Vislova	(Japan) Misaki Matsutomo (Japan) Ayaka Takahashi	19–21, 17–21	(silver) Runner-up

Mixed doubles
Year	Tournament	Partner	Opponent	Score	Result
2006	U.S. Open	(Russia) Vitalij Durkin	(Russia) Sergey Ivlev (Russia) Nina Vislova	21–15, 15–21, 21–16	(silver) Runner-up
2008	Russian Open	(Russia) Aleksandr Nikolaenko	(Russia) Vitalij Durkin (Russia) Nina Vislova	21–19, 21–19	(gold) Winner
2009	Russian Open	(Russia) Aleksandr Nikolaenko	(Russia) Vitalij Durkin (Russia) Nina Vislova	16–21, 16–21	(silver) Runner-up
2009	Dutch Open	(Russia) Aleksandr Nikolaenko	(Russia) Vitalij Durkin (Russia) Nina Vislova	13–21, 21–16, 21–12	(gold) Winner
2010	Russian Open	(Russia) Aleksandr Nikolaenko	(Russia) Vitalij Durkin (Russia) Nina Vislova	8–21, 21–14, 21–16	(gold) Winner
2010	Dutch Open	(Russia) Aleksandr Nikolaenko	(Japan) Shintaro Ikeda (Japan) Reiko Shiota	22–20, 21–9	(gold) Winner
2011	Russian Open	(Russia) Aleksandr Nikolaenko	(Japan) Shintaro Ikeda (Japan) Reiko Shiota	21–18, 21–14	(gold) Winner
2012	Russian Open	(Russia) Aleksandr Nikolaenko	(Russia) Vitalij Durkin (Russia) Nina Vislova	21–19, 21–17	(gold) Winner
2016	Russian Open	(Russia) Vladimir Ivanov	(India) Pranav Chopra (India) N. Sikki Reddy	17–21, 19–21	(silver) Runner-up

BWF Grand Prix Gold tournament
BWF Grand Prix tournament

=== BWF International Challenge/Series ===
Women's doubles
Year	Tournament	Partner	Opponent	Score	Result
2004	Russian International	(Russia) Nina Vislova	(Russia) Irina Ruslyakova (Russia) Anastasia Russkikh	2–15, 3–15	(silver) Runner-up
2005	Swedish International	(Russia) Nina Vislova	(Japan) Noriko Okuma (Japan) Miyuki Tai	2–15, 4–15	(silver) Runner-up
2005	Italian International	(Russia) Nina Vislova	(Russia) Ella Karachkova (Russia) Marina Yakusheva	2–15, 15–8, 15–5	(gold) Winner
2005	Scottish International	(Russia) Nina Vislova	(Sweden) Elin Bergblom (Sweden) Johanna Persson	15–5, 15–10	(gold) Winner
2006	Italian International	(Russia) Nina Vislova	(China) Cai Jiani (China) Yu Qi	12–21, 16–21	(silver) Runner-up
2006	Belgian International	(Russia) Nina Vislova	(Russia) Elena Shimko (Russia) Marina Yakusheva	13–21, 13–21	(silver) Runner-up
2006	Polish International	(Russia) Nina Vislova	(Poland) Kamila Augustyn (Poland) Nadieżda Kostiuczyk	21–14, 12–21, 18–21	(silver) Runner-up
2006	Le Volant d'Or de Toulouse	(Russia) Nina Vislova	(Russia) Ekaterina Ananina (Russia) Anastasia Russkikh	21–10, 18–21, 21–14	(gold) Winner
2006	Scottish International	(Russia) Nina Vislova	(Russia) Elena Shimko (Russia) Marina Yakusheva	20–22, 13–21	(silver) Runner-up
2007	White Nights	(Russia) Nina Vislova	(Russia) Ekaterina Ananina (Russia) Anastasia Russkikh	15–21, 14–21	(silver) Runner-up
2007	Bulgarian International	(Russia) Nina Vislova	(Malaysia) Lim Pek Siah (Malaysia) Haw Chiou Hwee	16–21, 21–13, 21–5	(gold) Winner
2007	Norwegian International	(Russia) Nina Vislova	(Russia) Ekaterina Ananina (Russia) Anastasia Russkikh	14–21, 22–20, 13–21	(silver) Runner-up
2007	Scottish International	(Russia) Nina Vislova	(England) Mariana Agathangelou (England) Gabrielle White	21–14, 21–14	(gold) Winner
2007	Italian International	(Russia) Nina Vislova	(Russia) Ekaterina Ananina (Russia) Anastasia Russkikh	15–21, 24–26	(silver) Runner-up
2008	European Circuit Finals	(Russia) Nina Vislova	(Russia) Ekaterina Ananina (Russia) Anastasia Russkikh	21–19, 13–21, 15–21	(silver) Runner-up
2008	White Nights	(Russia) Nina Vislova	(Russia) Ekaterina Ananina (Russia) Anastasia Russkikh	12–21, 18–21	(silver) Runner-up
2008	Belgian International	(Russia) Nina Vislova	(Netherlands) Rachel van Cutsen (Netherlands) Paulien van Dooremalen	21–10, 21–12	(gold) Winner
2008	Bulgarian International	(Russia) Nina Vislova	(Sweden) Emelie Lennartsson (Sweden) Emma Wengberg	21–16, 21–6	(gold) Winner
2008	Italian International	(Russia) Nina Vislova	(Sweden) Emelie Lennartsson (Sweden) Emma Wengberg	23–21, 21–14	(gold) Winner
2009	Finnish International	(Russia) Nina Vislova	(Germany) Sandra Marinello (Germany) Birgit Overzier	16–21, 21–12, 21–13	(gold) Winner
2009	Le Volant d'Or de Toulouse	(Russia) Nina Vislova	(France) Laura Choinet (France) Weny Rahmawati	21–12, 15–21, 21–9	(gold) Winner
2009	White Nights	(Russia) Nina Vislova	(Russia) Anastasia Prokopenko (Russia) Anastasia Russkikh	21–19, 13–21, 21–17	(gold) Winner
2009	Welsh International	(Russia) Nina Vislova	(Malaysia) Anita Raj Kaur (Malaysia) Joanne Quay	21–14, 21–16	(gold) Winner
2009	Scottish Open	(Russia) Nina Vislova	(England) Mariana Agathangelou (Scotland) Emma Mason	21–16, 21–16	(gold) Winner
2010	White Nights	(Russia) Nina Vislova	(Bulgaria) Petya Nedelcheva (Russia) Anastasia Russkikh	21–17, 21–15	(gold) Winner
2011	Dutch International	(Russia) Nina Vislova	(Netherlands) Lotte Jonathans (Netherlands) Paulien van Dooremalen	24–22, 21–12	(gold) Winner
2011	Czech International	(Russia) Nina Vislova	(Canada) Nicole Grether (Canada) Charmaine Reid	21–10, 21–16	(gold) Winner
2011	Italian International	(Russia) Nina Vislova	(Germany) Sandra Marinello (Germany) Birgit Michels	21–14, 21–9	(gold) Winner

Mixed doubles
Year	Tournament	Partner	Opponent	Score	Result
2004	Russian International	(Russia) Aleksandr Nikolaenko	(Russia) Vitalij Durkin (Russia) Tatjana Bibik	15–7, 15–13	(gold) Winner
2005	Italian International	(Russia) Aleksandr Nikolaenko	(Russia) Vitalij Durkin (Russia) Marina Yakusheva	10–15, 9–15	(silver) Runner-up
2006	Italian International	(Russia) Vitalij Durkin	(Denmark) Peter Steffensen (Denmark) Mette Schjoldager	20–22, 12–21	(silver) Runner-up
2006	Belgian International	(Russia) Vitalij Durkin	(France) Svetoslav Stoyanov (France) Élodie Eymard	21–14, 21–13	(gold) Winner
2006	Polish International	(Russia) Vitalij Durkin	(Poland) Robert Mateusiak (Poland) Nadieżda Kostiuczyk	4–21, 21–9, 13–21	(silver) Runner-up
2006	Scottish International	(Russia) Vitalij Durkin	(Russia) Aleksandr Nikolaenko (Russia) Nina Vislova	22–20, 21–11	(gold) Winner
2007	Austrian International	(Russia) Vitalij Durkin	(Russia) Aleksandr Nikolaenko (Russia) Nina Vislova	21–14, 22–20	(gold) Winner
2007	Norwegian International	(Russia) Vitalij Durkin	(Germany) Kristof Hopp (Germany) Birgit Overzier	15–21, 21–13, 15–21	(silver) Runner-up
2007	Italian International	(Russia) Vitalij Durkin	(Russia) Aleksandr Nikolaenko (Russia) Nina Vislova	15–21, 21–18, 16–21	(silver) Runner-up
2009	Welsh International	(Russia) Aleksandr Nikolaenko	(Russia) Vitalij Durkin (Russia) Nina Vislova	13–21, 13–21	(silver) Runner-up
2009	Scottish Open	(Russia) Aleksandr Nikolaenko	(Australia) Raj Veeran (Australia) Renuga Veeran	21–11, 21–16	(gold) Winner
2011	Dutch International	(Russia) Aleksandr Nikolaenko	(Denmark) Mikkel Delbo Larsen (Denmark) Mie Schjøtt-Kristensen	13–21, 12–11 retired	(gold) Winner
2011	Czech International	(Russia) Aleksandr Nikolaenko	(Estonia) Gert Künka (Sweden) Amanda Högström	21–15, 21–12	(gold) Winner
2011	Italian International	(Russia) Aleksandr Nikolaenko	(Russia) Vitalij Durkin (Russia) Nina Vislova	13–21, 21–18, 21–17	(gold) Winner

BWF International Challenge tournament
BWF International Series tournament
