= Rune Ulsing =

Danish badminton player (born 1984)

Personal information
- Born: 7 June 1984 (age 42)

Sport
- Country: Denmark
- Sport: Badminton

Men's singles
- Highest ranking: 40 (14 August 2010)
- BWF profile
Medal record
Men's badminton
Representing Denmark
European Junior Championships
Silver medal – second place	2001 Spała	Boys' doubles
Silver medal – second place	2001 Spała	Mixed team
Silver medal – second place	2003 Esbjerg	Boys' singles
Silver medal – second place	2003 Esbjerg	Mixed team

Rune Ulsing (born 7 June 1984) is a Danish badminton player.

== Achievements ==
=== European Junior Championships ===
Boys' Singles
Year	Venue	Opponent	Score	Result
2003	Esbjerg Badminton Center; Esbjerg, Denmark	(Germany) Marc Zwiebler	12–15, 10–15	Silver

Boys' doubles
Year	Venue	Partner	Opponent	Score	Result
2001	Spała Olympic Center, Spala, Poland	(Denmark) Peter Hasbak	(Denmark) Carsten Mogensen (Denmark) Rasmus Andersen	9–15, 11–15	Silver

=== BWF International Challenge/Series ===
Men's singles
Year	Tournament	Opponent	Score	Result
2009	Bulgarian International	(Scotland) Kieran Merrilees	21–10, 20–22, 21–5	(gold) Winner
2010	Dutch International	(Republic of Ireland) Scott Evans	23–21, 22–20	(gold) Winner
2010	Spanish Open	(Netherlands) Eric Pang	12–21, 19–21	(silver) Runner-up
2012	Denmark International	(Sweden) Henri Hurskainen	14–21, 11–21	(silver) Runner-up

BWF International Challenge tournament
BWF International Series tournament
BWF Future Series tournament
