= Nadieżda Zięba =

Belarusian-Polish badminton player (born 1984)

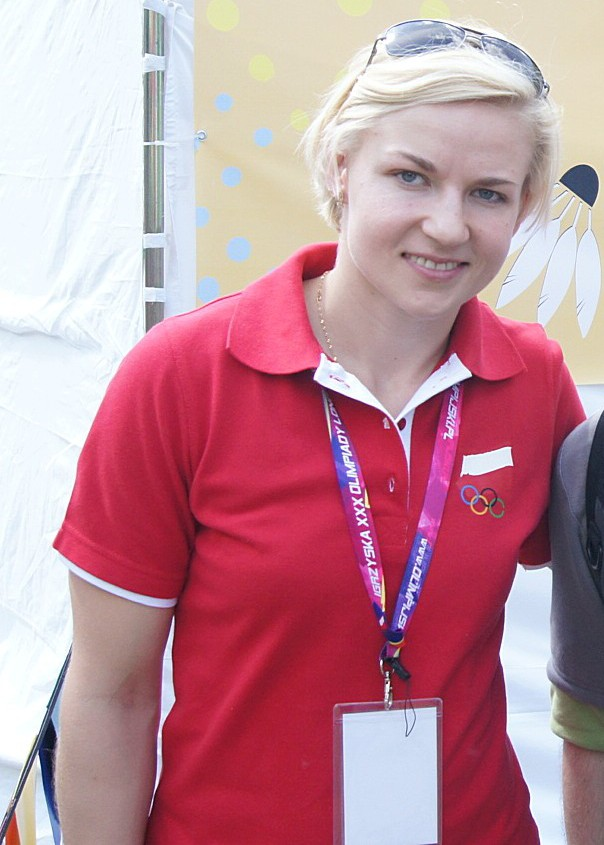

Personal information
- Nickname: Nadia
- Born: Nadieżda Kostiuczyk; 21 May 1984 (age 42) Brest, Byelorussian SSR, Soviet Union
- Height: 1.71 m (5 ft 7 in)
- Weight: 65 kg (143 lb)

Sport
- Country: Poland
- Sport: Badminton
- Handedness: Right

Women's & mixed doubles
- Highest ranking: 1 (XD 26 August 2010)
- BWF profile
Medal record
Women's badminton
Representing Poland
European Championships
Gold medal – first place	2012 Karlskrona	Mixed doubles
Silver medal – second place	2008 Herning	Mixed doubles
Silver medal – second place	2010 Manchester	Mixed doubles
Bronze medal – third place	2006 Den Bosch	Mixed doubles
European Mixed Team Championships
Bronze medal – third place	2008 Herning	Mixed team
Representing Belarus
European Junior Championships
Gold medal – first place	2001 Spała	Girls' doubles

Nadieżda "Nadia" Zięba (Polish pronunciation: [naˈdjɛʐda ˈʑɛmba]; née Kostiuczyk; born 21 May 1984) is a Polish retired badminton player of Belarusian origin. She won the mixed doubles gold medal at the 2012 European Championships. Zięba was three times mixed doubles quarter finalists in the badminton at the Summer Olympics.

== Career ==
Kostiuczyk played the 2007 BWF World Championships in mixed doubles with Robert Mateusiak. They were defeated in quarterfinals by Zheng Bo and Gao Ling of China, 16–21, 17–21. She also played women's doubles with Kamila Augustyn and lost in the first round. They won the silver medal at the 2008 European Championships. At the Belarusian National Badminton Championships she won 7 titles.

== Achievements ==
=== European Championships ===
Mixed doubles
Year	Venue	Partner	Opponent	Score	Result
2006	Maaspoort Sports and Events; Den Bosch, Netherlands	(Poland) Robert Mateusiak	(Denmark) Thomas Laybourn (Denmark) Kamilla Rytter Juhl	16–21, 21–14, 21–23	Bronze
2008	Messecenter; Herning, Denmark	(Poland) Robert Mateusiak	(England) Anthony Clark (England) Donna Kellogg	21–16, 20–22, 15–21	Silver
2010	Manchester Evening News Arena; Manchester, England	(Poland) Robert Mateusiak	(Denmark) Thomas Laybourn (Denmark) Kamilla Rytter Juhl	19–21, 21–18, 12–21	Silver
2012	Telenor Arena; Karlskrona, Sweden	(Poland) Robert Mateusiak	(Denmark) Mads Pieler Kolding (Denmark) Julie Houmann	21–12, 24–22	Gold

=== European Junior Championships ===
Girls' doubles
Year	Venue	Partner	Opponent	Score	Result
2001	Spała Olympic Center, Spała, Poland	(Poland) Kamila Augustyn	(Germany) Carina Mette (Germany) Juliane Schenk	15–2, 15–7	Gold

=== BWF Superseries ===
The BWF Superseries, which was launched on 14 December 2006 and implemented in 2007, was a series of elite badminton tournaments, sanctioned by the Badminton World Federation (BWF). BWF Superseries levels were Superseries and Superseries Premier. A season of Superseries consisted of twelve tournaments around the world that had been introduced since 2011. Successful players were invited to the Superseries Finals, which were held at the end of each year.

Mixed doubles
Year	Tournament	Partner	Opponent	Score	Result
2009	Hong Kong Open	(Poland) Robert Mateusiak	(Indonesia) Nova Widianto (Indonesia) Liliyana Natsir	22–20, 21–16	(gold) Winner
2010	Indonesia Open	(Poland) Robert Mateusiak	(Indonesia) Hendra Setiawan (Russia) Anastasia Russkikh	21–18, 22–20	(gold) Winner

BWF Super Series Finals tournament
BWF Super Series Premier tournament
BWF Super Series tournament

=== BWF Grand Prix ===
The BWF Grand Prix had two levels, the Grand Prix and Grand Prix Gold. It was a series of badminton tournaments sanctioned by the Badminton World Federation (BWF) and played between 2007 and 2017. The World Badminton Grand Prix was sanctioned by the International Badminton Federation from 1983 to 2006.

Women's doubles
Year	Tournament	Partner	Opponent	Score	Result
2006	Denmark Open	(Poland) Kamila Augustyn	(England) Gail Emms (England) Donna Kellogg	22–20, 21–10	(gold) Winner

Mixed doubles
Year	Tournament	Partner	Opponent	Score	Result
2005	Dutch Open	(Poland) Robert Mateusiak	(Germany) Ingo Kindervater (Germany) Kathrin Piotrowski	15–5, 15–5	(gold) Winner
2006	Bitburger Open	(Poland) Robert Mateusiak	(Singapore) Hendri Saputra (Singapore) Li Yujia	22–24, 21–16, 21–8	(gold) Winner
2007	Russian Open	(Poland) Robert Mateusiak	(China) He Hanbin (China) Yu Yang	25–23, 13–21, 21–13	(gold) Winner
2012	Bitburger Open	(Poland) Robert Mateusiak	(Denmark) Anders Kristiansen (Denmark) Julie Houmann	11–21, 16–21	(silver) Runner-up
2015	Bitburger Open	(Poland) Robert Mateusiak	(England) Chris Adcock (England) Gabby Adcock	21–18, 21–17	(gold) Winner
2016	U.S. Open	(Poland) Robert Mateusiak	(Japan) Yugo Kobayashi (Japan) Wakana Nagahara	18–21, 14–21	(silver) Runner-up

BWF Grand Prix Gold tournament
BWF Grand Prix tournament

=== BWF International Challenge/Series ===
Women's singles
Year	Tournament	Opponent	Score	Result
2001	Slovak International	(Denmark) Tine Høy	5–7, 7–8, 1–7	(silver) Runner-up
2002	Slovak International	(Russia) Elena Sukhareva	11–8, 7–11, 0–11	(silver) Runner-up

Women's doubles
Year	Tournament	Partner	Opponent	Score	Result
2000	Slovak International	(Poland) Kamila Augustyn	(Czech Republic) Hana Procházková (Czech Republic) Ivana Vilímková	15–1, 15–5	(gold) Winner
2001	Czech International	(Poland) Kamila Augustyn	(England) Emma Constable (England) Natalie Munt	7–3, 7–2, 2–7, 7–5	(gold) Winner
2001	Slovak International	(Poland) Kamila Augustyn	(Denmark) Julie Houmann (Denmark) Karina Sørensen	7–4, 7–4, 7–1	(gold) Winner
2002	Polish International	(Poland) Kamila Augustyn	(Austria) Verena Fastenbauer (Austria) Simone Prutsch	7–2, 7–0, 7–5	(gold) Winner
2002	Czech International	(Belarus) Olga Konon	(Sweden) Elin Bergblom (Sweden) Johanna Persson	5–11, 8–11	(silver) Runner-up
2003	Polish International	(Poland) Kamila Augustyn	(Japan) Chihiro Ohsaka (Japan) Akiko Nakashima	11–13, 11–4, 11–2	(gold) Winner
2003	Croatian International	(Poland) Kamila Augustyn	(Japan) Yoshiko Iwata (Japan) Miyuki Tai	8–11, 8–11	(silver) Runner-up
2003	Finnish International	(Poland) Kamila Augustyn	(Denmark) Julie Houmann (Denmark) Lene Mørk	5–11, 11–8, 11–5	(gold) Winner
2003	Hungarian International	(Poland) Kamila Augustyn	(Russia) Elena Shimko (Russia) Marina Yakusheva	17–16, 15–9	(gold) Winner
2003	Le Volant d'Or de Toulouse	(Poland) Kamila Augustyn	(Ukraine) Larisa Griga (Ukraine) Elena Nozdran	15–10, 15–2	(gold) Winner
2003	Bitburger International	(Poland) Kamila Augustyn	(Germany) Nicole Grether (Germany) Juliane Schenk	9–15, 15–10, 12–15	(silver) Runner-up
2004	Swedish International	(Poland) Kamila Augustyn	(Japan) Yoshiko Iwata (Japan) Miyuki Tai	15–5, 15–3	(gold) Winner
2004	Portugal International	(Poland) Kamila Augustyn	(Russia) Elena Shimko (Russia) Marina Yakusheva	15–6, 15–5	(gold) Winner
2004	Scottish International	(Poland) Kamila Augustyn	(Malaysia) Chor Hooi Yee (Malaysia) Lim Pek Siah	15–8, 15–11	(gold) Winner
2004	Bitburger International	(Poland) Kamila Augustyn	(Germany) Neli Boteva (Germany) Katja Michalowsky	15–10, 15–3	(gold) Winner
2005	Polish International	(Poland) Kamila Augustyn	(Germany) Birgit Overzier (Germany) Michaela Peiffer	15–13, 15–6	(gold) Winner
2005	Czech International	(Poland) Kamila Augustyn	(Denmark) Christinna Pedersen (Denmark) Line Reimers	15–2, 15–1	(gold) Winner
2005	Slovak International	(Poland) Kamila Augustyn	(Scotland) Imogen Bankier (Scotland) Emma Mason	15–7, 15–3	(gold) Winner
2006	Polish International	(Poland) Kamila Augustyn	(Russia) Valeria Sorokina (Russia) Nina Vislova	14–21, 21–12, 21–18	(gold) Winner
2007	Polish International	(Poland) Kamila Augustyn	(Denmark) Christinna Pedersen (Denmark) Mie Schjøtt-Kristensen	21–17, 21–14	(gold) Winner
2008	Dutch International	(Poland) Kamila Augustyn	(Russia) Ekaterina Ananina (Russia) Anastasia Russkikh	21–16, 11–21, 21–13	(gold) Winner

Mixed doubles
Year	Tournament	Partner	Opponent	Score	Result
2001	Slovak International	(Belarus) Andrey Konakh	(Denmark) Jesper Thomsen (Denmark) Julie Houmann	2–7, 4–7, 1–7	(silver) Runner-up
2002	Czech International	(Belarus) Andrey Konakh	(France) Manuel Dubrulle (France) Élodie Eymard	11–5, 13–11	(gold) Winner
2002	Slovak International	(Belarus) Andrey Konakh	(Russia) Nikolay Zuev (Russia) Marina Yakusheva	11–4, 11–5	(gold) Winner
2005	Finnish International	(Poland) Robert Mateusiak	(Germany) Jochen Cassel (Germany) Birgit Overzier	15–4, 15–5	(gold) Winner
2005	Polish International	(Poland) Robert Mateusiak	(Poland) Michał Łogosz (Poland) Kamila Augustyn	15–3, 15–6	(gold) Winner
2006	Polish International	(Poland) Robert Mateusiak	(Russia) Vitalij Durkin (Russia) Valeria Sorokina	21–4, 9–21, 21–13	(gold) Winner
2007	Polish International	(Poland) Robert Mateusiak	(Germany) Tim Dettmann (Germany) Annekatrin Lillie	21–19, 17–21, 21–19	(gold) Winner
2008	White Nights	(Poland) Robert Mateusiak	(Russia) Vitalij Durkin (Russia) Nina Vislova	18–21, 14–21	(silver) Runner-up
2009	Le Volant d'Or de Toulouse	(Poland) Robert Mateusiak	(Denmark) Rasmus Bonde (Denmark) Britta Andersen	21–10, 21–11	(gold) Winner
2009	Bulgarian International	(Poland) Robert Mateusiak	(Poland) Adam Cwalina (Poland) Małgorzata Kurdelska	21–18, 21–9	(gold) Winner
2011	Polish Open	(Poland) Robert Mateusiak	(Poland) Rafał Hawel (Poland) Kamila Augustyn	21–13, 21–17	(gold) Winner
2012	Dutch International	(Poland) Robert Mateusiak	(Russia) Andrej Ashmarin (Russia) Anastasia Panushkina	21–10, 21–19	(gold) Winner
2013	Polish Open	(Poland) Robert Mateusiak	(Poland) Wojciech Szkudlarczyk (Poland) Agnieszka Wojtkowska	15–21, 21–16, 21–14	(gold) Winner
2015	White Nights	(Poland) Robert Mateusiak	(Republic of Ireland) Sam Magee (Republic of Ireland) Chloe Magee	18–21, 17–21	(silver) Runner-up
2015	Lagos International	(Poland) Robert Mateusiak	(India) Tarun Kona (India) N. Sikki Reddy	21–19, 21–7	(gold) Winner
2015	Kharkiv International	(Poland) Robert Mateusiak	(France) Gaëtan Mittelheisser (France) Audrey Fontaine	21–14, 21–14	(gold) Winner
2015	Belgian International	(Poland) Robert Mateusiak	(Sweden) Jonathan Nordh (Sweden) Emelie Fabbeke	15–21, 21–6, 21–8	(gold) Winner
2015	Bulgarian International	(Poland) Robert Mateusiak	(Russia) Evgenij Dremin (Russia) Evgenia Dimova	21–14, 21–18	(gold) Winner
2015	Irish Open	(Poland) Robert Mateusiak	(Denmark) Mathias Christiansen (Denmark) Lena Grebak	21–19, 18–21, 18–21	(silver) Runner-up
2015	Mersin Turkey International	(Poland) Robert Mateusiak	(Australia) Matthew Chau (Australia) Gronya Somerville	21–12, 21–13	(gold) Winner
2016	Swedish Masters	(Poland) Robert Mateusiak	(Denmark) Mathias Christiansen (Denmark) Lena Grebak	21–10, 21–13	(gold) Winner
2016	Polish Open	(Poland) Robert Mateusiak	(Malaysia) Tan Kian Meng (Malaysia) Lai Pei Jing	21–11, 21–16	(gold) Winner
2016	Welsh International	(Poland) Robert Mateusiak	(Malaysia) Goh Soon Huat (Malaysia) Shevon Jemie Lai	21–16, 11–21, 21–18	(gold) Winner
2017	Polish Open	(Poland) Robert Mateusiak	(Chinese Taipei) Tseng Min-hao (Chinese Taipei) Hu Ling-fang	20–22, 22–20, 21–13	(gold) Winner

BWF International Challenge tournament
BWF International Series tournament
BWF Future Series tournament

== Record against selected opponents ==
Mixed doubles results with Robert Mateusiak against year-end Finals finalists, World Championships semi-finalists, and Olympic quarter-finalists.

Players	M	W	L	Diff.
(China) He Hanbin & Yu Yang	7	3	4	–1
(China) Xie Zhongbo & Zhang Yawen	1	0	1	–1
(China) Xu Chen & Ma Jin	6	1	5	–4
(China) Zhang Jun & Gao Ling	1	0	1	–1
(China) Zheng Bo & Gao Ling	5	0	5	–5
(China) Zheng Bo & Ma Jin	1	0	1	–1
(Chinese Taipei) Lee Sheng-mu & Chien Yu-chin	2	1	1	0
(Denmark) Jens Eriksen & Mette Schjoldager	1	0	1	–1
(Denmark) Joachim Fischer Nielsen & Christinna Pedersen	6	2	4	–2
(Denmark) Thomas Laybourn & Kamilla Rytter Juhl	4	0	4	–4
(England) Chris Adcock & Gabby Adcock	6	3	3	0
(England) Chris Adcock & (Scotland) Imogen Bankier	1	1	0	+1
(England) Anthony Clark & Donna Kellogg	4	1	3	–2
(England) Nathan Robertson & Gail Emms	3	1	2	–1
(Germany) Michael Fuchs & Birgit Michels	3	2	1	+1

Players	M	W	L	Diff.
(Hong Kong) Lee Chun Hei & Chau Hoi Wah	1	1	0	+1
(India) Valiyaveetil Diju & Jwala Gutta	3	1	2	–1
(Indonesia) Tontowi Ahmad & Liliyana Natsir	2	0	2	–2
(Indonesia) Praveen Jordan & Debby Susanto	1	1	0	+1
(Indonesia) Nova Widianto & Vita Marissa	2	2	0	+2
(Indonesia) Nova Widianto & Liliyana Natsir	4	2	2	0
(Japan) Yuta Watanabe & Arisa Higashino	1	0	1	–1
(Malaysia) Chan Peng Soon & Goh Liu Ying	6	2	4	–2
(New Zealand) Daniel Shirley & Sara Runesten-Petersen	1	1	0	+1
(South Korea) Ko Sung-hyun & Ha Jung-eun	2	1	1	0
(South Korea) Lee Yong-dae & Lee Hyo-jung	1	0	1	–1
(South Korea) Shin Baek-cheol & Eom Hye-won	1	1	0	+1
(Sweden) Fredrik Bergström & Johanna Persson	2	2	0	+2
(Thailand) Sudket Prapakamol & Saralee Thungthongkam	3	1	2	–1
