= Arif Rasidi =

Indonesian-born French badminton player (born 1980)

Personal information
- Born: 6 August 1980 (age 46)

Sport
- Country: France
- Sport: Badminton
- Event: Men's singles & doubles

Men's singles & doubles
- BWF profile
Medal record
Men's badminton
Representing Indonesia
World Junior Championships
Bronze medal – third place	1998 Melbourne	Boys' singles

Arif Rasidi (born 6 August 1980) is a French badminton player originally from Indonesia, and was part of the Indonesia national team from 1999 to 2001. He was a former World Junior bronze medalist in 1998, French national coach and now works as a coach in CLTO Badminton Orléans. Rasidi won men's singles titles at the 2003 Dutch International, and 2005 Portuguese International. His wife, Weny Rahmawati, also a former badminton player and now works in CLTO.

== Achievements ==
=== World Junior Championships ===
Boys' singles
Year	Venue	Opponent	Score	Result
1998	Sports and Aquatic Centre; Melbourne, Australia	(China) Zhang Yang	15–10, 4–15, 9–15	Bronze

=== IBF International ===
Men's singles
Year	Tournament	Opponent	Score	Result
2003	Luxembourge Memorial Thierry Theis	(Japan) Shoji Sato	13–15, 13–15	(silver) Runner-up
2003	Dutch International	(Netherlands) Eric Pang	15–11, 15–13	(gold) Winner
2005	Portuguese International	(Finland) Ville Lång	15–3, 1–15, 15–3	(gold) Winner
2005	Dutch International	(Germany) Björn Joppien	7–15, 1–15	(silver) Runner-up
2005	French International	(Russia) Stanislav Pukhov	12–15, 3–15	(silver) Runner-up
2006	Portuguese International	(Denmark) Michael Christensen	9–21, 11–21	(silver) Runner-up

Men's doubles
Year	Tournament	Partner	Opponent	Score	Result
2003	Le Volant d'Or de Toulouse	(France) Jean-Michel Lefort	(Belgium) Wouter Claes (Belgium) Frédéric Mawet	15–12, 10–15, 3–15	(silver) Runner-up
