= Hungarian International =

Badminton tournament

The Hungarian International in badminton is an international open held in Hungary since 1974. In the first years it was held every two years, and since 1978 it is held annually. The competition is typically held in autumn, and it belongs to the EBU Circuit. The Hungarian National Badminton Championships started in 1960.

== Previous winners ==
=== Hungarian International ===
Year	Men's singles	Women's singles	Men's doubles	Women's doubles	Mixed doubles	Ref
1974	(Austria) Hermann Fröhlich	(East Germany) Monika Cassens	(Socialist Federal Republic of Yugoslavia) Gregor Berden (Socialist Federal Republic of Yugoslavia) Stane Koprivsek	(East Germany) Monika Cassens (East Germany) Christine Zierath	(East Germany) Joachim Schimpke (East Germany) Monika Cassens	
1975	No competition					
1976	(East Germany) Erfried Michalowsky	(East Germany) Monika Cassens	(East Germany) Erfried Michalowsky (East Germany) Roland Riese	(East Germany) Monika Cassens (East Germany) Angela Michalowski	(East Germany) Edgar Michalowski (East Germany) Monika Cassens	
1977	No competition					
1978	(West Germany) Rolf Heyer	(East Germany) Monika Cassens	(West Germany) Rolf Heyer (West Germany) Olaf Rosenow	(East Germany) Monika Cassens (East Germany) Angela Michalowski	(East Germany) Edgar Michalowski (East Germany) Monika Cassens	
1979	(England) Nick Yates	(England) Paula Kilvington	(England) Nick Yates (England) Duncan Bridge	(East Germany) Monika Cassens (East Germany) Angela Michalowski	(Netherlands) Herman Leidelmeijer (Netherlands) Hanke de Kort	
1980	(Czechoslovakia) Michal Malý	(England) Helen Troke	(England) Dipak Tailor (England) Duncan Bridge	(East Germany) Monika Cassens (East Germany) Ilona Michalowsky	(East Germany) Edgar Michalowski (East Germany) Monika Cassens	
1981	(England) Dipak Tailor	(England) Gillian Gowers	(England) Dipak Tailor (England) Chris Dobson	(England) Catharina Troke (England) Gillian Gowers	(England) Dipak Tailor (England) Gillian Gowers	
1982	(Czechoslovakia) Michal Malý	(East Germany) Monika Cassens	(England) Joe Ford (England) Glen Milton	(England) Jill Pringle (England) Fiona Elliott	(East Germany) Edgar Michalowski (East Germany) Monika Cassens	
1983	(Austria) Johan Ratheyser	(West Germany) Heidemarie Krickhaus	(East Germany) Edgar Michalowski (East Germany) Erfried Michalowsky	(East Germany) Monika Cassens (East Germany) Petra Michalowsky	(East Germany) Erfried Michalowsky (East Germany) Petra Michalowsky	
1984	(West Germany) Thomas Künstler	(East Germany) Monika Cassens	(Sweden) Peter Skole (Sweden) Ch. Norberg	(Netherlands) Erica van Dijck (Netherlands) Monique Hoogland	(Netherlands) Bas von Barnau-Sijthoff (Netherlands) Erica van Dijck	
1985	(Sweden) Peter Skole	(Soviet Union) Elena Rybkina	(Austria) Klaus Fischer (Austria) Heinz Fischer	(Soviet Union) Elena Rybkina (Soviet Union) Ludmila Galyamova	(Soviet Union) Nikolay Kalinskij (Soviet Union) Elena Rybkina	
1986	(Austria) Klaus Fischer	(Soviet Union) Svetlana Belyasova	(Austria) Klaus Fischer (Austria) Heinz Fischer	(Soviet Union) Svetlana Belyasova (Soviet Union) Vlada Belyutina	(Soviet Union) Vitaliy Shmakov (Soviet Union) Svetlana Belyasova	
1987	(Austria) Klaus Fischer	(Poland) Bożena Siemieniec	(Poland) Jerzy Dołhan (Poland) Grzegorz Olchowik	(Poland) Bożena Haracz (Poland) Bożena Siemieniec	(Poland) Jerzy Dołhan (Poland) Bożena Haracz	
1988	(Soviet Union) Andrey Antropov	(Poland) Bożena Siemieniec	(Soviet Union) Andrey Antropov (Soviet Union) Sergey Melnikov	(East Germany) Monika Cassens (East Germany) Petra Michalowsky	(Poland) Jerzy Dołhan (Poland) Marzena Masiuk	
1989	(Soviet Union) Andrey Antropov	(South Korea) Chun Sung-suk	(South Korea) Shung Han-kook (South Korea) Shon Jin-hwan	(South Korea) Chun Sung-suk (South Korea) Lee Jung-mi	(South Korea) Shung Han-kook (South Korea) Chung Myung-hee	
1990	(South Korea) Ahn Jae-chang	(South Korea) Kang Bok-seung	(South Korea) Lee Sang-bok (South Korea) Shon Jin-hwan	(South Korea) Hwang Hye-young (South Korea) Yoon Sook-jung	(South Korea) Lee Sang-bok (South Korea) Hwang Hye-young	
1991	(South Korea) Lee Yong-sun	(South Korea) Park Soo-yun	(South Korea) Kim Young-gil (South Korea) Lee Dong-soo	(South Korea) Park Soo-yun (South Korea) Kim Shin-young	(South Korea) Kim Young-gil (South Korea) Park Soo-yun	
1992	(England) Peter Bush	(England) Alison Humby	(Germany) Björn Siegmund (Germany) Kai Mitteldorf	(England) Tanya Groves (England) Joanne Davies	(Austria) Heinz Fischer (Austria) Irina Serova	
1993	(Norway) Hans Sperre Jr.	(South Korea) Yoo Eun-young	(Germany) Kai Mitteldorf (Germany) Uwe Ossenbrink	(South Korea) Kim Kyung-ran (South Korea) Chung Jae-hee	(Ukraine) Valerij Strelcov (Ukraine) Elena Nozdran	
1994	(Denmark) T. Lundgaard Hansen	(Denmark) Anne Sondergaard	(Poland) Damian Pławecki (Poland) Robert Mateusiak	(England) Sara Hardaker (England) Rebeca Pantaney	(England) Ian Pearson (England) Sara Hardaker	
1995	(Denmark) Anders Boesen	(Denmark) Michelle Rasmussen	(England) Julian Robertson (England) Nathan Robertson	(England) Tanya Groves (England) Alison Humby	(Austria) Jürgen Koch (Austria) Irina Serova	
1996	(Denmark) Peter Janum	(England) Tracey Hallam	(Denmark) Jonas Rasmussen (Denmark) Jan Ø. Jørgensen	(Sweden) Johanna Holgersson (Sweden) Astrid Crabo	(Denmark) Jonas Rasmussen (Denmark) Ann-Lou Jorgensen	
1997	(Netherlands) Chris Bruil	(Ukraine) Elena Nozdran	(Bulgaria) Michail Popov (Bulgaria) Svetoslav Stoyanov	(Netherlands) Lotte Jonathans (Netherlands) Ginny Severien	(Netherlands) Norbert van Barneveld (Netherlands) Lotte Jonathans	
1998	(Belgium) Ruud Kuijten	(Denmark) Christina Sorensen	(Poland) Michał Łogosz (Poland) Robert Mateusiak	(Denmark) Rikke Broen (Denmark) Sara Runesten	(Denmark) Martin Bruun (Denmark) Sara Runesten	
1999	(South Korea) Hwang Sun-ho	(South Korea) Kim Ji-hyun	(South Korea) Kim Yong-hyun (South Korea) Yim Bang-eun	(South Korea) Lee Hyo-jung (South Korea) Yim Kyung-jin	(South Korea) Kim Yong-hyun (South Korea) Yim Kyung-jin	
2000	(Poland) Przemysław Wacha	(Slovenia) Maja Pohar	(India) Valiyaveetil Diju (India) Thomas Sanave	(Spain) Mercedes Cuenca (Spain) Yoana Martínez	(Spain) José Antonio Crespo (Spain) Dolores Marco	
2001	(Denmark) Jonas Lyduch	(Bulgaria) Petya Nedelcheva	(Sweden) Johan Holm (Sweden) Joakim Andersson	(Sweden) Elin Bergblom (Sweden) Johanna Persson	(Slovenia) Andrej Pohar (Slovenia) Maja Pohar	
2002	(Russia) Stanislav Pukhov	(Russia) Elena Sukhareva	(Russia) Stanislav Pukhov (Russia) Nikolai Zuyev	(Russia) Marina Yakusheva (Russia) Elena Shimko	(Russia) Sergei Ivlev (Russia) Natalia Gorodnicheva	
2003	(South Korea) Jang Young-soo	(Scotland) Susan Hughes	(South Korea) Hwang Ji-man (South Korea) Lee Jae-jin	(Poland) Kamila Augustyn (Poland) Nadieżda Kostiuczyk	(Russia) Nikolai Zuyev (Russia) Marina Yakusheva	
2004	(Canada) Bobby Milroy	(Bulgaria) Petya Nedelcheva	(Russia) Nikolai Zuyev (Russia) Sergei Ivlev	(Malaysia) Lim Pek Siah (Malaysia) Chor Hooi Yee	(Malaysia) Ong Ewe Hock (Malaysia) Lim Pek Siah	
2005	(India) Anup Sridhar	(Indonesia) Atu Rosalina	(Austria) Jürgen Koch (Austria) Peter Zauner	(Russia) Ekaterina Ananina (Russia) Anastasia Russkikh	(Russia) Vladimir Malkov (Russia) Anastasia Russkikh	
2006	(Sweden) George Rimarcdi	(Japan) Chie Umezu	(Sweden) Imanuel Hirschfeld (Sweden) Imam Sodikin	(Russia) Ekaterina Ananina (Russia) Anastasia Russkikh	(Russia) Vladimir Malkov (Russia) Anastasia Russkikh	
2007	(Denmark) Jan Ø. Jørgensen	(Iceland) Ragna Ingólfsdóttir	(Denmark) Mads Pieler Kolding (Denmark) Peter Mørk	(Denmark) Line Damkjær Kruse (Denmark) Camilla Sørensen	(China) Zhang Yi (China) Cai Jiani	
2008	(India) Anand Pawar	(Bulgaria) Petya Nedelcheva	(Denmark) Kasper Henriksen (Denmark) Christian Skovgaard	(Russia) Anastasia Prokopenko (Russia) Olga Golovanova	(Russia) Vitalij Durkin (Russia) Nina Vislova	
2009	(Germany) Dieter Domke	(Switzerland) Jeanine Cicognini	(Poland) Adam Cwalina (Poland) Wojciech Szkudlarczyk	(Russia) Tatjana Bibik (Russia) Olga Golovanova	(Poland) Wojciech Szkudlarczyk (Poland) Agnieszka Wojtkowska	
2010	(Finland) Ville Lång	(Germany) Karin Schnaase	(Germany) Peter Käsbauer (Germany) Josche Zurwonne	(Germany) Johanna Goliszewski (Germany) Carla Nelte	(Netherlands) Jacco Arends (Netherlands) Selena Piek	
2011	(Denmark) Rasmus Fladberg	(Bulgaria) Stefani Stoeva	(Croatia) Zvonimir Đurkinjak (Croatia) Zvonimir Hölbling	(Poland) Natalia Pocztowiak (Croatia) Staša Poznanović	(Indonesia) Viki Indra Okvana (Indonesia) Gustiani Megawati	
2012	(Russia) Vladimir Malkov	(Ukraine) Marija Ulitina	(Netherlands) Ruud Bosch (Netherlands) Jim Middelburg	(Germany) Carola Bott (Croatia) Staša Poznanović	(Croatia) Zvonimir Đurkinjak (Croatia) Staša Poznanović	
2013	(Spain) Ernesto Velazquez	(Russia) Olga Golovanova	(Indonesia) Viki Indra Okvana (Indonesia) Albert Saputra	(Russia) Olga Golovanova (Russia) Viktoriia Vorobeva	(Netherlands) Robin Tabeling (Netherlands) Myke Halkema	
2014	(Denmark) Kasper Dinesen	(England) Fontaine Chapman	(Croatia) Zvonimir Đurkinjak (Croatia) Zvonimir Hölbling	(Malaysia) Cheah Yee See (Malaysia) Goh Yea Ching	(England) Ben Lane (England) Jessica Pugh	
2015	(Finland) Kalle Koljonen	(Indonesia) Aprilia Yuswandari	(Scotland) Martin Campbell (Scotland) Patrick MacHugh	(Malaysia) Cheah Yee See (Malaysia) Chin Kah Mun	(England) Chris Coles (England) Victoria Williams	
2016	(Denmark) Kim Bruun	(Malaysia) Yap Rui Chen	(Singapore) Danny Bawa Chrisnanta (Singapore) Hendra Wijaya	(Bulgaria) Mariya Mitsova (Bulgaria) Petya Nedelcheva	(Singapore) Terry Hee (Singapore) Tan Wei Han	
2017	(Denmark) Victor Svendsen	(Turkey) Neslihan Yiğit	(Denmark) Frederik Colberg (Denmark) Rasmus Fladberg	(Russia) Ekaterina Bolotova (Russia) Alina Davletova	(Russia) Rodion Alimov (Russia) Alina Davletova	
2018	(Denmark) Rasmus Messerschmidt	(Turkey) Neslihan Yiğit	(Denmark) David Daugaard (Denmark) Frederik Søgaard	(Russia) Ekaterina Bolotova (Russia) Alina Davletova	(Denmark) Joel Eipe (Denmark) Mette Poulsen	
2019	(Spain) Pablo Abián	(Turkey) Neslihan Yiğit	(South Korea) Kim Duk-young (South Korea) Kim Sa-rang	(Canada) Rachel Honderich (Canada) Kristen Tsai	(South Korea) Kim Sa-rang (South Korea) Kim Ha-na	
2020	Cancelled (Note: This tournament, originally to be played from 28 to 31 October, was later cancelled due to the COVID-19 pandemic in Hungary.)					
2021	(Bulgaria) Daniel Nikolov	(Chinese Taipei) Hsu Wen-chi	(Denmark) Emil Lauritzen (Denmark) Mads Vestergaard	(Thailand) Ornnicha Jongsathapornparn (Thailand) Phataimas Muenwong	(England) Rory Easton (England) Annie Lado	
2022	(Chinese Taipei) Lee Chia-hao	(Bulgaria) Kaloyana Nalbantova	(Chinese Taipei) Lin Yu-chieh (Chinese Taipei) Su Li-wei	(England) Abbygael Harris (England) Annie Lado	(Netherlands) Brian Wassink (Netherlands) Alyssa Tirtosentono	
2023	(England) Harry Huang	(Denmark) Frederikke Lund	(Denmark) Rasmus Espersen (Denmark) Marcus Rindshøj	(Spain) Paula López (Spain) Lucía Rodríguez	(Denmark) Rasmus Espersen (Denmark) Amalie Cecilie Kudsk	
2024	(Denmark) Jakob Houe	(Chinese Taipei) Wang Yu-si	(Canada) Jonathan Lai (Canada) Nyl Yakura	(England) Abbygael Harris (England) Lizzie Tolman	(Serbia) Mihajlo Tomić (Serbia) Anđela Vitman	
2025	(Denmark) Jakob Houe	(Denmark) Laura Fløj Thomsen	(Chinese Taipei) Chen Hung-ming (Chinese Taipei) Tsai Cheng-han	(Denmark) Lærke Hvid (Denmark) Anna Klausholm	(Denmark) Mads Andersson (Denmark) Anna Klausholm	
2026	(Denmark) Mathias Solgaard	(Switzerland) Milena Schnider	(Serbia) Viktor Petrovic (Serbia) Mihajlo Tomić	(Germany) Leona Michalski (Denmark) Signe Schulz	(Serbia) Mihajlo Tomić (Serbia) Anđela Vitman	

=== Hungarian Future Series ===
Year	Men's singles	Women's singles	Men's doubles	Women's doubles	Mixed doubles	Ref
2026	(Denmark) Christopher Vittoriani	(Bulgaria) Hristomira Popovska	(Denmark) Sebastian Mønster Andersen (Denmark) Birk Norman	(Denmark) Anne Fuglsang (Denmark) Laura Fløj Thomsen	(Germany) Jan Colin Völker (Germany) Emma Moszczynski	

== Performances by nation ==
=== Hungarian International ===
As of the 2026 edition

Rank	Nation	MS	WS	MD	WD	XD	Total
1	Denmark	13	5	7	3.5	5	33.5
2	Soviet Union; Russia	4	4	3	10	8	29
3	England	4	6	5	7	5	27
4	South Korea	4	5	6	5	5	25
5	East Germany	1	5	2	7	6	21
6	Poland	1	2	4	2.5	3	12.5
7	West Germany; Germany	3	2	4	2		11
8	Netherlands	1		1	2	6	10
9	Austria	4		3		2	9
10	Bulgaria	1	5	1	1		8
11	Sweden	2		3	2		7
12	Chinese Taipei	1	2	2			5
12	Malaysia		1		3	1	5
12	Spain	2			2	1	5
15	Croatia			2	1	1	4
15	Indonesia		2	1		1	4
15	Yugoslavia; Serbia			2		2	4
18	Canada	1		1	1		3
18	India	2		1			3
18	Turkey		3				3
18	Ukraine		2			1	3
22	Czechoslovakia	2					2
22	Finland	2					2
22	Scotland		1	1			2
22	Singapore			1		1	2
22	Slovenia		1			1	2
22	Switzerland		2				2
28	Belgium	1					1
28	China					1	1
28	Iceland		1				1
28	Japan		1				1
28	Norway	1					1
28	Thailand				1		1
Total		50	50	50	50	50	250

=== Hungarian Future Series ===
As of the 2026 edition

Rank	Nation	MS	WS	MD	WD	XD	Total
1	Denmark	1		1	1		3
2	Bulgaria		1				1
2	Germany					1	1
Total		1	1	1	1	1	5
