= Kamila Augustyn =

Polish badminton player (born 1982)

Personal information
- Born: Kamila Anna Augustyn; 14 January 1982 (age 44) Słupsk, Poland
- Height: 1.68 m (5 ft 6 in)
- Weight: 68 kg (150 lb)

Sport
- Country: Poland
- Sport: Badminton
- Handedness: Left

Women's singles & doubles
- Highest ranking: 66 (WS) 20 September 2012; 54 (WD) 18 October 2012; 291 (XD) 15 October 2009
- BWF profile
Medal record
Women's badminton
Representing Poland
European Mixed Team Championships
Bronze medal – third place	2008 Herning	Mixed team
European Junior Championships
Gold medal – first place	2001 Spała	Girls' doubles
Silver medal – second place	2001 Spała	Girls' singles
Bronze medal – third place	1999 Glasgow	Girls' singles

Kamila Anna Augustyn (born 14 January 1982 in Słupsk) is a Polish badminton player from Piasta Słupsk club. She won her first elite badminton title at the 2006 Denmark Open in the women's doubles event partnered with Nadieżda Kostiuczyk. She competed at the 2008 Beijing and 2012 London Summer Olympics in the women's singles event.

== Achievements ==
=== European Junior Championships ===
Girls' singles
Year	Venue	Opponent	Score	Result
2001	Spała Olympic Center; Spała, Poland	(Germany) Juliane Schenk	2–11, 9–11	Silver
1999	Kelvin Hall; Glasgow, Scotland	(Germany) Petra Overzier	1–11, 2–11	Bronze

Girls' doubles
Year	Venue	Partner	Opponent	Score	Result
2001	Spała Olympic Center; Spała, Poland	(Belarus) Nadieżda Kostiuczyk	(Germany) Carina Mette (Germany) Juliane Schenk	15–2, 15–7	Gold

=== IBF Grand Prix ===
The World Badminton Grand Prix sanctioned by International Badminton Federation (IBF) since 1983.

Women's doubles
Year	Tournament	Partner	Opponent	Score	Result
2006	Denmark Open	(Poland) Nadieżda Kostiuczyk	(England) Gail Emms (England) Donna Kellogg	22–20, 21–10	(gold) Winner

=== BWF International Challenge/Series ===
Women's singles
Year	Tournament	Opponent	Score	Result
2012	White Nights	(Republic of Ireland) Chloe Magee	19–21, 21–14, 21–14	(gold) Winner
2005	Slovak International	(Bulgaria) Petya Nedelcheva	2–11, 9–11	(silver) Runner-up
2005	Lithuanian International	(France) Emilie Despierre	11–3, 11–2	(gold) Winner
2005	Riga International	(Estonia) Kati Tolmoff	11–0, 11–1	(gold) Winner
2003	Dutch International	(Netherlands) Brenda Beenhakker	11–5, 11–4	(gold) Winner
2002	Polish International	(Canada) Kara Solmundson	7–5, 3–7, 7–4, 7–4	(gold) Winner
2001	Czech International	(England) Rebecca Pantaney	1–7, 8–6, 5–7, 0–7	(silver) Runner-up
2000	Slovak International	(England) Tracey Hallam	9–11, 1–11	(silver) Runner-up

Women's doubles
Year	Tournament	Partner	Opponent	Score	Result
2012	Polish International	(Poland) Agnieszka Wojtkowska	(Wales) Sarah Thomas (Wales) Carissa Turner	21–15, 21–14	(gold) Winner
2011	Hungarian International	(Poland) Agnieszka Wojtkowska	(Poland) Natalia Pocztowiak (Croatia) Stasa Poznanovic	20–22, 22–20, 18–21	(silver) Runner-up
2008	Dutch International	(Poland) Nadieżda Kostiuczyk	(Russia) Ekaterina Ananina (Russia) Anastasia Russkikh	21–16, 11–21, 21–13	(gold) Winner
2007	Polish International	(Poland) Nadieżda Kostiuczyk	(Denmark) Christinna Pedersen (Denmark) Mie Schjøtt-Kristensen	21–17, 21–14	(gold) Winner
2006	Polish International	(Poland) Nadieżda Kostiuczyk	(Russia) Valeria Sorokina (Russia) Nina Vislova	14–21, 21–12, 21–18	(gold) Winner
2005	Slovak International	(Poland) Nadieżda Kostiuczyk	(Scotland) Imogen Bankier (Scotland) Emma Mason	15–7, 15–3	(gold) Winner
2005	Czech International	(Poland) Nadieżda Kostiuczyk	(Denmark) Christinna Pedersen (Denmark) Line Reimers	15–2, 15–1	(gold) Winner
2005	Polish International	(Poland) Nadieżda Kostiuczyk	(Germany) Birgit Overzier (Germany) Michaela Peiffer	15–13, 15–6	(gold) Winner
2004	Bitburger International	(Poland) Nadieżda Kostiuczyk	(Germany) Neli Boteva (Germany) Katja Michalowsky	15–10, 15–3	(gold) Winner
2004	Scottish International	(Poland) Nadieżda Kostiuczyk	(Malaysia) Chor Hooi Yee (Malaysia) Lim Pek Siah	15–8, 15–11	(gold) Winner
2004	Portugal International	(Poland) Nadieżda Kostiuczyk	(Russia) Elena Shimko (Russia) Marina Yakusheva	15–6, 15–5	(gold) Winner
2004	Swedish International	(Poland) Nadieżda Kostiuczyk	(Japan) Yoshiko Iwata (Japan) Miyuki Tai	15–5, 15–3	(gold) Winner
2003	Bitburger International	(Poland) Nadieżda Kostiuczyk	(Germany) Nicole Grether (Germany) Juliane Schenk	9–15, 15–10, 12–15	(silver) Runner-up
2003	Le Volant d'Or de Toulouse	(Poland) Nadieżda Kostiuczyk	(Ukraine) Larisa Griga (Ukraine) Elena Nozdran	15–10, 15–2	(gold) Winner
2003	Hungarian International	(Poland) Nadieżda Kostiuczyk	(Russia) Elena Shimko (Russia) Marina Yakusheva	17–16, 15–9	(gold) Winner
2003	Finnish International	(Poland) Nadieżda Kostiuczyk	(Denmark) Julie Houmann (Denmark) Lene Mørk	5–11, 11–8, 11–5	(gold) Winner
2003	Croatian International	(Poland) Nadieżda Kostiuczyk	(Japan) Yoshiko Iwata (Japan) Miyuki Tai	8–11, 8–11	(silver) Runner-up
2003	Polish International	(Poland) Nadieżda Kostiuczyk	(Japan) Chihiro Ohsaka (Japan) Akiko Nakashima	11–13, 11–4, 11–2	(gold) Winner
2002	Polish International	(Belarus) Nadieżda Kostiuczyk	(Austria) Verena Fastenbauer (Austria) Simone Prutsch	7–2, 7–0, 7–5	(gold) Winner
2001	Slovak International	(Belarus) Nadieżda Kostiuczyk	(Denmark) Julie Houmann (Denmark) Karina Sørensen	7–4, 7–4, 7–1	(gold) Winner
2001	Czech International	(Belarus) Nadieżda Kostiuczyk	(England) Emma Constable (England) Natalie Munt	7–3, 7–2, 2–7, 7–5	(gold) Winner
2000	Slovak International	(Belarus) Nadieżda Kostiuczyk	(Czech Republic) Hana Procházková (Czech Republic) Ivana Vilimkova	15–1, 15–5	(gold) Winner

Mixed doubles
Year	Tournament	Partner	Opponent	Score	Result
2011	Polish Open	(Poland) Rafal Hawel	(Poland) Robert Mateusiak (Poland) Nadieżda Kostiuczyk	13–21, 17–21	(silver) Runner-up
2005	Riga International	(Lithuania) Kęstutis Navickas	(France) Jean-Michel Lefort (Lithuania) Akvilė Stapušaitytė	15–10, 15–7	(gold) Winner
2005	Polish International	(Poland) Michał Łogosz	(Poland) Robert Mateusiak (Poland) Nadieżda Kostiuczyk	3–15, 6–15	(silver) Runner-up
2003	Polish International	(Poland) Robert Mateusiak	(Sweden) Jörgen Olsson (Sweden) Frida Andreasson	7–11, 13–11, 4–11	(silver) Runner-up

BWF International Challenge tournament
BWF International Series tournament
BWF Future Series tournament
