= Arctic Open =

Annual badminton tournament in Finland

- Official website
- Founded: 1990; 36 years ago
- Editions: 26 (2026)
- Location: Vantaa (2026); Finland
- Venue: Energia Areena (2026)
- Prize money: US$500,000 (2026)

Men's
- Draw: 32S / 32D
- Current champions: Anders Antonsen (singles); Aaron Tai; Yap Roy King (doubles)
- Most singles titles: 3 Joachim Persson
- Most doubles titles: 2 Kim Astrup; Evgenij Isakov; Anders Skaarup Rasmussen

Women's
- Draw: 32S / 32D
- Current champions: Mia Blichfeldt (singles); Chen Fanshutian; Luo Xumin (doubles)
- Most singles titles: 2 Han Yue; Pernille Nedergaard
- Most doubles titles: 4 Misato Aratama; Petya Nedelcheva; Marlene Thomsen; Akane Watanabe

Mixed doubles
- Draw: 32
- Current champions: Jiang Zhenbang; Wei Yaxin
- Most titles (male): 2 Anders Skaarup Rasmussen; Feng Yanzhe; Jiang Zhenbang
- Most titles (female): 3 Lena Grebak

Super 500
- Arctic Open; Australian Open; Hong Kong Open; Hylo Open; Indonesia Masters; Japan Masters; Korea Open; Malaysia Masters; Thailand Open

Last completed
- 2026 Arctic Open

The Arctic Open (known as Finnish International until 2013), is an international open badminton tournament held in Finland since 1990. It was halted in 1994, 1995, and between 1997 and 2001. In 2014, a second international tournament, the Finnish International, was introduced while the original event was renamed the Finnish Open. From 2023 onwards, it has been part of the BWF World Tour Super 500, under the title Arctic Open.

== History of host cities ==
| City | Years host |
|---|---|
| Vantaa | 2023–2028 |

Locations of Arctic Open host cities

== Previous winners ==
| Year | Men's singles | Women's singles | Men's doubles | Women's doubles | Mixed doubles | Ref |
|---|---|---|---|---|---|---|
| 1990 | (Denmark) Morten Frost | (Denmark) Pernille Nedergaard | (Indonesia) Imay Hendra (Indonesia) Bagus Setiadi | (Sweden) Maria Bengtsson (Sweden) Christine Magnusson | (Denmark) Thomas Lund (Denmark) Pernille Dupont | |
| 1991 | (China) Liu Jun | (China) Tang Jiuhong | (China) Chen Hongyong (China) Chen Kang | (England) Gillian Clark (Denmark) Nettie Nielsen | (Denmark) Henrik Svarrer (Sweden) Maria Bengtsson | |
| 1992 | (Denmark) Poul-Erik Høyer Larsen | (Denmark) Pernille Nedergaard | (Sweden) Peter Axelsson (Sweden) Pär-Gunnar Jönsson | (Denmark) Lisbet Stuer-Lauridsen (Denmark) Marlene Thomsen | (Denmark) Max Gandrup (Denmark) Marlene Thomsen | |
| 1993 | (Denmark) Peter Espersen | (Denmark) Camilla Martin | (Denmark) Christian Jakobsen (Denmark) Henrik Svarrer | (Denmark) Camilla Martin (Denmark) Marlene Thomsen | (Sweden) Jan-Eric Antonsson (Sweden) Astrid Crabo | |
| 1994– 1995 | No competition | | | | | |
| 1996 | (Sweden) Rikard Magnusson | (England) Joanne Muggeridge | (England) James Anderson (England) Ian Pearson | (Wales) Kelly Morgan (England) Joanne Muggeridge | (England) James Anderson (England) Emma Chaffin | |
| 1997– 2001 | No competition | | | | | |
| 2002 | (Finland) Kasperi Salo | (Finland) Anu Weckström | (Russia) Evgenij Isakov (Russia) Andrei Zholobov | (Sweden) Elin Bergblom (Sweden) Johanna Persson | (Bulgaria) Konstantin Dobrev (Bulgaria) Petya Nedelcheva | |
| 2003 | (Finland) Kasperi Salo | (Germany) Huaiwen Xu | (Russia) Mikhail Kell (Russia) Victor Maljutin | (Poland) Kamila Augustyn (Poland) Nadieżda Kostiuczyk | (Denmark) Thomas Laybourn (Denmark) Julie Houmann | |
| 2004 | (Japan) Hidetaka Yamada | (Singapore) Jiang Yanmei | (Russia) Evgenij Isakov (Russia) Sergey Ivlev | (Bulgaria) Neli Boteva (Bulgaria) Petya Nedelcheva | (Belarus) Andrei Konakh (Belarus) Olga Konon | |
| 2005 | (Denmark) Joachim Persson | (Scotland) Susan Hughes | (Sweden) Henrik Andersson (Sweden) Fredrik Bergström | (Germany) Sandra Marinello (Germany) Kathrin Piotrowski | (Poland) Robert Mateusiak (Poland) Nadieżda Kostiuczyk | |
| 2006 | (Denmark) Joachim Persson | (Germany) Petra Overzier | (Denmark) Jonas Rasmussen (Denmark) Peter Steffensen | (Russia) Ekaterina Ananina (Russia) Anastasia Russkikh | (Denmark) Jonas Rasmussen (Denmark) Britta Andersen | |
| 2007 | (Denmark) Joachim Persson | (China) Li Wenyan | (Belgium) Wouter Claes (Belgium) Frédéric Mawet | (Denmark) Christinna Pedersen (Denmark) Mie Schjøtt-Kristensen | (Germany) Tim Dettmann (Germany) Annekatrin Lillie | |
| 2008 | (Denmark) Martin Bille Larsen | (England) Elizabeth Cann | (Indonesia) Fran Kurniawan (Indonesia) Rendra Wijaya | (Denmark) Lena Frier Kristiansen (Denmark) Kamilla Rytter Juhl | (Indonesia) Fran Kurniawan (Indonesia) Shendy Puspa Irawati | |
| 2009 | (Denmark) Peter Mikkelsen | (Germany) Juliane Schenk | (Chinese Taipei) Chen Hung-ling (Chinese Taipei) Lin Yu-lang | (Russia) Valeria Sorokina (Russia) Nina Vislova | (Russia) Vitalij Durkin (Russia) Nina Vislova | |
| 2010 | (Estonia) Raul Must | (Russia) Anastasia Prokopenko | (France) Laurent Constantin (France) Sébastien Vincent | (France) Élisa Chanteur (France) Barbara Matias | (Denmark) Mikkel Delbo Larsen (Denmark) Mie Schjøtt-Kristensen | |
| 2011 | No competition | | | | | |
| 2012 | (England) Rajiv Ouseph | (Netherlands) Yao Jie | (Russia) Vladimir Ivanov (Russia) Ivan Sozonov | (Canada) Alex Bruce (Canada) Michelle Li | (England) Chris Adcock (Scotland) Imogen Bankier | |
| 2013 | (England) Rajiv Ouseph | (Spain) Carolina Marín | (Malaysia) Nelson Heg (Malaysia) Teo Ee Yi | (Scotland) Imogen Bankier (Bulgaria) Petya Nedelcheva | (Denmark) Anders Skaarup Rasmussen (Denmark) Lena Grebak | |
| 2014 | (Denmark) Emil Holst | (Denmark) Line Kjærsfeldt | (Denmark) Kim Astrup (Denmark) Anders Skaarup Rasmussen | (Denmark) Line Damkjær Kruse (Denmark) Marie Røpke | (Denmark) Anders Skaarup Rasmussen (Denmark) Lena Grebak | |
| 2015 | (Russia) Vladimir Malkov | (Spain) Beatriz Corrales | (England) Andrew Ellis (England) Peter Mills | (England) Heather Olver (England) Lauren Smith | (Russia) Anatoliy Yartsev (Russia) Evgeniya Kosetskaya | |
| 2016 | (Japan) Kanta Tsuneyama | (Denmark) Anna Thea Madsen | (Denmark) Mathias Christiansen (Denmark) David Daugaard | (Japan) Misato Aratama (Japan) Akane Watanabe | (Denmark) Mathias Christiansen (Denmark) Lena Grebak | |
| 2017 | (Denmark) Rasmus Gemke | (Japan) Shiori Saito | (Chinese Taipei) Liao Min-chun (Chinese Taipei) Su Cheng-heng | (Japan) Misato Aratama (Japan) Akane Watanabe | (Chinese Taipei) Tseng Min-hao (Chinese Taipei) Hu Ling-fang | |
| 2018 | (Malaysia) Leong Jun Hao | (Indonesia) Gregoria Mariska Tunjung | (Indonesia) Akbar Bintang Cahyono (Indonesia) Muhammad Reza Pahlevi Isfahani | (Japan) Asumi Kugo (Japan) Megumi Yokoyama | (Indonesia) Alfian Eko Prasetya (Indonesia) Marsheilla Gischa Islami | |
| 2019 | (Thailand) Kunlavut Vitidsarn | (Denmark) Julie Dawall Jakobsen | (Indonesia) Muhammad Shohibul Fikri (Indonesia) Bagas Maulana | (Japan) Erina Honda (Japan) Nozomi Shimizu | (Indonesia) Rehan Naufal Kusharjanto (Indonesia) Lisa Ayu Kusumawati | |
| 2020 | Cancelled (Note: This tournament, originally to be played from 2 to 5 April, was later cancelled due to the COVID-19 pandemic in Finland.) | | | | | |
| 2021 | Cancelled (Note: This tournament, originally to be played from 16 to 19 September, was later cancelled due to the COVID-19 pandemic in Finland.) | | | | | |
| 2022 | Cancelled (Note: This tournament, originally to be played from 28 September to 1 October, was later cancelled due to the COVID-19 pandemic in Finland.) | | | | | |
| 2023 | (Malaysia) Lee Zii Jia | (China) Han Yue | (Denmark) Kim Astrup (Denmark) Anders Skaarup Rasmussen | (China) Liu Shengshu (China) Tan Ning | (China) Feng Yanzhe (China) Huang Dongping | |
| 2024 | (Chinese Taipei) Chou Tien-chen | (China) Han Yue | (Malaysia) Goh Sze Fei (Malaysia) Nur Izzudin | (China) Liu Shengshu (China) Tan Ning | (China) Feng Yanzhe (China) Huang Dongping | |
| 2025 | (Chinese Taipei) Chou Tien-chen | (Japan) Akane Yamaguchi | (England) Ben Lane (England) Sean Vendy | (Malaysia) Pearly Tan (Malaysia) Thinaah Muralitharan | (China) Jiang Zhenbang (China) Wei Yaxin | |
| 2026 | (Denmark) Anders Antonsen | (Denmark) Mia Blichfeldt | (Malaysia) Aaron Tai (Malaysia) Yap Roy King | (China) Chen Fanshutian (China) Luo Xumin | (China) Jiang Zhenbang (China) Wei Yaxin | |

== Performances by nation ==
As of 2026 edition

| Pos | Nation | MS | WS | MD | WD | XD | Total |
|---|---|---|---|---|---|---|---|
| 1 | Denmark | 11 | 7 | 5 | 5.5 | 8 | 36.5 |
| 2 | China | 1 | 4 | 1 | 3 | 4 | 13 |
| 3 | England | 2 | 2 | 3 | 2 | 2 | 11 |
| 4 | Russia | 1 | 1 | 4 | 2 | 2 | 10 |
| 5 | Indonesia | | 1 | 4 | | 3 | 8 |
| 5 | Japan | 2 | 2 | | 4 | | 8 |
| 7 | Sweden | 1 | | 2 | 2 | 1.5 | 6.5 |
| 8 | Malaysia | 2 | | 3 | 1 | | 6 |
| 9 | Chinese Taipei | 2 | | 2 | | 1 | 5 |
| 9 | Germany | | 3 | | 1 | 1 | 5 |
| 11 | Finland* | 2 | 1 | | | | 3 |
| 12 | Bulgaria | | | | 1.5 | 1 | 2.5 |
| 13 | France | | | 1 | 1 | | 2 |
| 13 | Poland | | | | 1 | 1 | 2 |
| 13 | Scotland | | 1 | | 0.5 | 0.5 | 2 |
| 13 | Spain | | 2 | | | | 2 |
| 17 | Belarus | | | | | 1 | 1 |
| 17 | Belgium | | | 1 | | | 1 |
| 17 | Canada | | | | 1 | | 1 |
| 17 | Estonia | 1 | | | | | 1 |
| 17 | Netherlands | | 1 | | | | 1 |
| 17 | Thailand | 1 | | | | | 1 |
| 17 | Singapore | | 1 | | | | 1 |
| 24 | Wales | | | | 0.5 | | 0.5 |
| Total | | 26 | 26 | 26 | 26 | 26 | 130 |

* Host nation
