= Joachim Persson =

Danish badminton player (born 1983)

Personal information
- Born: 23 May 1983 (age 43) Slagelse, Denmark
- Height: 1.84 m (6 ft 0 in)

Sport
- Country: Denmark
- Sport: Badminton
- Handedness: Left

Men's singles
- Highest ranking: 6
- BWF profile
Medal record
Men's badminton
Representing Denmark
Thomas Cup
Silver medal – second place	2006 Sendai & Tokyo	Men's team
European Championships
Silver medal – second place	2008 Herning	Men's singles
Bronze medal – third place	2006 Den Bosch	Men's singles
European Mixed Team Championships
Gold medal – first place	2006 Den Bosch	Mixed team
Gold medal – first place	2008 Herning	Mixed team
Gold medal – first place	2009 Liverpool	Mixed team
European Men's Team Championships
Gold medal – first place	2006 Thessalonica	Men's team
Gold medal – first place	2008 Almere	Men's team
Gold medal – first place	2010 Warsaw	Men's team
Representing Germany
European Junior Championships
Gold medal – first place	2001 Spała	Mixed team
Silver medal – second place	2001 Spała	Boys' singles

Joachim Persson (born 23 May 1983) is a Danish badminton player.

== Career ==
Persson was born in Denmark but his family moved to Germany in his early years. He began to playing badminton in Trittau, Germany together with his parents. As German player, he helped the German team to win the mixed team title at the 2001 European Junior Championships, also won a silver medal in the singles event. In 2002, he moved back to Denmark and started to practice at Brøndby.

He played the 2006 IBF World Championships in men's singles and he was defeated in the third round by Lee Chong Wei 21–16, 21–12. Joachim Persson reached the finals of the Denmark Open Super Series 2008 and lost in the finals to compatriot Peter Gade.

In 2004 he won the Irish International, in 2005 the Finnish International Championships and the V Italian International, and in 2006 the Austrian International, the Swedish International and the Finnish International Championships.

In 2019, he was banned from badminton tournaments for 18 months and has been ordered to pay costs of US$4,500, guilty of four violations of the code of conduct in relation to betting wagering and irregular match results.

== Achievements ==
=== European Championships ===
Men's singles
Year	Venue	Opponent	Score	Result
2006	Maaspoort; Den Bosch, Netherlands	(Denmark) Peter Gade	20–22, 10–21	Bronze
2008	Messecenter; Herning, Denmark	(Denmark) Kenneth Jonassen	13–21, 16–21	Silver

=== European Junior Championships ===
Boys' singles
Year	Venue	Opponent	Score	Result
2001	Spała Olympic Center; Spała, Poland	(Netherlands) Eric Pang	13–15, 3–15	Silver

=== BWF Superseries (2 runners-up) ===
The BWF Superseries, which was launched on 14 December 2006 and implemented in 2007, was a series of elite badminton tournaments, sanctioned by the Badminton World Federation (BWF). BWF Superseries levels were Superseries and Superseries Premier. A season of Superseries consisted of twelve tournaments around the world that had been introduced since 2011. Successful players were invited to the Superseries Finals, which were held at the end of each year.

Men's singles
Year	Tournament	Opponent	Score	Result
2008	Denmark Open	(Denmark) Peter Gade	18–21, 21–17, 14–21	(silver) Runner-up
2010	French Open	(Indonesia) Taufik Hidayat	16–21, 11–21	(silver) Runner-up

BWF Super Series Finals tournament
BWF Super Series Premier tournament
BWF Super Series tournament

=== BWF Grand Prix (1 title) ===
The BWF Grand Prix had two levels, the Grand Prix and Grand Prix Gold. It was a series of badminton tournaments sanctioned by the Badminton World Federation (BWF) and played between 2007 and 2017.

Men's singles
Year	Tournament	Opponent	Score	Result
2008	Bulgarian Open	(Chinese Taipei) Hsieh Yu-hsin	17–21, 21–19, 21–19	(gold) Winner

BWF Grand Prix tournament
BWF Grand Prix Gold tournament

=== BWF International Challenge/Series (9 titles, 7 runners-up) ===
Men's singles
Year	Tournament	Opponent	Score	Result
2002	Le Volant d'Or de Toulouse	(Denmark) Kasper Ødum	4–15, 5–15	(silver) Runner-up
2004	Croatian International	(Japan) Hidetaka Yamada	15–4, 8–15, 13–15	(silver) Runner-up
2004	Irish International	(Sweden) Per-Henrik Croona	15–8, 15–9	(gold) Winner
2005	Finnish International	(Poland) Przemysław Wacha	15–4, 15–17, 15–9	(gold) Winner
2005	Italian International	(Poland) Przemysław Wacha	15–17, 15–9, 15–9	(gold) Winner
2006	Austrian International	(Poland) Przemysław Wacha	21–15, 21–10	(gold) Winner
2006	Swedish Masters	(Poland) Przemysław Wacha	17–21, 22–20, 21–19	(gold) Winner
2006	Finnish International	(Denmark) Kasper Ødum	13–21, 21–17, 21–17	(gold) Winner
2007	Finnish International	(Ukraine) Vladislav Druzchenko	21–14, 21–18	(gold) Winner
2011	Morocco International	(Spain) Pablo Abián	19–21, 21–17, 19–21	(silver) Runner-up
2012	Czech International	(Denmark) Kim Bruun	21–11, 21–10	(gold) Winner
2013	Spanish Open	(Denmark) Hans-Kristian Vittinghus	9–21, 16–21	(silver) Runner-up
2013	Canadian International	(Netherlands) Eric Pang	22–24, 16–21	(silver) Runner-up
2014	Spanish Open	(Denmark) Rasmus Fladberg	21–12, 21–13	(gold) Winner
2014	Kharkiv International	(Denmark) Rasmus Fladberg	7–11, 4–11, 9–11	(silver) Runner-up
2014	Czech International	(Germany) Marc Zwiebler	13–21, 18–21	(silver) Runner-up

BWF International Challenge tournament
BWF International Series tournament

== Record Against Selected Opponents ==
Includes results from all competitions 2002–present.

- (China) Chen Yu 0–4
- (China) Bao Chunlai 0–4
- (China) Xia Xuanze 0–1
- (China) Lin Dan 0–5
- (China) Du Pengyu 2–1
- (China) Chen Jin 0–1
- (Chinese Taipei) Chou Tien-chen 0–2
- (Chinese Taipei) Hsieh Yu-hsing 1–0
- (Czech Republic) Petr Koukal 5–2
- (Denmark) Kenneth Jonassen 0–4
- (Denmark) Peter Gade 1–2
- (Denmark) Jan Ø. Jørgensen 2–2
- (Germany) Marc Zwiebler 2–3
- (Indonesia) Taufik Hidayat 1–4
- (Indonesia) Sony Dwi Kuncoro 1–2
- (Indonesia) Simon Santoso 1–0
- (Indonesia) Tommy Sugiarto 1–1
- (Japan) Sho Sasaki 4–0
- (Japan) Kenichi Tago 0–2
- (South Korea) Park Sung-hwan 0–1
- (South Korea) Shon Seung-mo 1–1
- (South Korea) Lee Hyun-il 0–5
- (South Korea) Shon Wan-ho 0–2
- (Malaysia) Lee Chong Wei 0–5
- (Poland) Przemysław Wacha 7–1
- (Thailand) Boonsak Ponsana 0–2
- (Vietnam) Nguyễn Tiến Minh 0–2
