= Dutch International =

Badminton championships

- Sport: Badminton
- Founded: 2000
- Founder: VELO badminton
- Country: Netherlands
- Website: dutch-international.nl

The Dutch International is an open international badminton tournament held in the Netherlands. The tournament annually held in Wateringen and organized by the VELO badminton since 2000. The Dutch International is a part of the European Badminton Circuit and graded as BWF International Series level. This tournament is the second largest badminton event in the Netherlands with a total price money of $10.000.

== Previous winners ==
The table below gives an overview of the winners at the Dutch International since 2000.

Year	Men's singles	Women's singles	Men's doubles	Women's doubles	Mixed doubles	Ref
2000	(Ukraine) Vladislav Druzchenko	(Netherlands) Lonneke Janssen	(Bulgaria) Mihail Popov (Bulgaria) Svetoslav Stoyanov	(Japan) Satomi Igawa (Japan) Hiroko Nagamine	(Denmark) Mathias Boe (Denmark) Karina Sørensen	
2001	(Poland) Przemysław Wacha	(Netherlands) Yao Jie	(Denmark) Mathias Boe (Denmark) Thomas Hovgaard	(Netherlands) Nicole van Hooren (Netherlands) Erica van den Heuvel	(Netherlands) Chris Bruil (Netherlands) Lotte Jonathans	
2002	(Germany) Björn Joppien	(Netherlands) Brenda Beenhakker	(New Zealand) John Gordon (New Zealand) Daniel Shirley	(Germany) Carina Mette (Germany) Juliane Schenk	(England) Peter Jeffrey (England) Suzanne Rayappan	
2003	(France) Arif Rasidi	(Poland) Kamila Augustyn	(Denmark) Rasmus Andersen (Denmark) Carsten Mogensen	(Denmark) Majken Vange (Denmark) Helle Nielsen	(Denmark) Peter Steffensen (Denmark) Helle Nielsen	
2004	(Germany) Björn Joppien	(Germany) Petra Overzier	(France) Jean-Michel Lefort (France) Svetoslav Stoyanov	(Bulgaria) Petya Nedelcheva (Bulgaria) Nely Boteva	(France) Svetoslav Stoyanov (France) Victoria Wright	
2005	(Germany) Björn Joppien	(Bulgaria) Petya Nedelcheva	(Germany) Ingo Kindervater (Germany) Kristof Hopp	(Germany) Nicole Grether (Germany) Juliane Schenk	(Sweden) Fredrik Bergström (Sweden) Johanna Persson	
2006	(Germany) Björn Joppien	(Germany) Petra Overzier	(Germany) Ingo Kindervater (Germany) Kristof Hopp	(Germany) Nicole Grether (Germany) Juliane Schenk	(Germany) Kristof Hopp (Germany) Birgit Overzier	
2007	(China) Wu Yunyong	(Estonia) Kati Tolmoff	(England) Kristian Roebuck (Scotland) Andrew Bowman	(Netherlands) Paulien van Dooremalen (Netherlands) Rachel van Cutsen	(England) Robin Middleton (England) Liza Parker	
2008	(Denmark) Hans-Kristian Vittinghus	(Ukraine) Larisa Griga	(Germany) Kristof Hopp (Germany) Ingo Kindervater	(Poland) Kamila Augustyn (Poland) Nadieżda Kostiuczyk	(Denmark) Rasmus Bonde (Denmark) Helle Nielsen	
2009	(Netherlands) Dicky Palyama	(Germany) Juliane Schenk	(Denmark) Mads Conrad-Petersen (Denmark) Mads Pieler Kolding	(Denmark) Line Damkjær Kruse (Denmark) Mie Schjøtt-Kristensen	(Germany) Johannes Schöttler (Germany) Birgit Overzier	
2010	(Denmark) Rune Ulsing	(Denmark) Karina Jørgensen	(Denmark) Mads Conrad-Petersen (Denmark) Mads Pieler Kolding	(Netherlands) Samantha Barning (Netherlands) Eefje Muskens	(Denmark) Anders Skaarup Rasmussen (Denmark) Anne Skelbæk	
2011	(Denmark) Hans-Kristian Vittinghus	(Scotland) Susan Egelstaff	(France) Baptiste Carême (France) Sylvain Grosjean	(Russia) Valeria Sorokina (Russia) Nina Vislova	(Russia) Aleksandr Nikolaenko (Russia) Valeria Sorokina	
2012	(Indonesia) Andre Kurniawan Tedjono	(Netherlands) Yao Jie	(Malaysia) Nelson Heg (Malaysia) Teo Ee Yi	(Netherlands) Lotte Bruil (Netherlands) Paulien van Dooremalen	(Poland) Robert Mateusiak (Poland) Nadieżda Zięba	
2013	(Denmark) Viktor Axelsen	(Spain) Beatriz Corrales	(Poland) Łukasz Moreń (Poland) Wojciech Szkudlarczyk	(Japan) Rie Eto (Japan) Yu Wakita	(Germany) Michael Fuchs (Germany) Birgit Michels	
2014	(Denmark) Rasmus Fladberg	(Netherlands) Soraya de Visch Eijbergen	(Denmark) Kasper Antonsen (Denmark) Mikkel Delbo Larsen	(Netherlands) Samantha Barning (Netherlands) Iris Tabeling	(Denmark) Niclas Nøhr (Denmark) Sara Thygesen	
2015	(Denmark) Anders Antonsen	(Belgium) Lianne Tan	(Denmark) Kasper Antonsen (Denmark) Oliver Babic	(Netherlands) Gayle Mahulette (Netherlands) Cheryl Seinen	(Denmark) Kasper Antonsen (Denmark) Amanda Madsen	
2016	(Spain) Pablo Abián	(Germany) Yvonne Li	(Denmark) Alexander Bond (Denmark) Joel Eipe	(England) Chloe Birch (England) Sophie Brown	(Denmark) Alexander Bond (Denmark) Ditte Søby Hansen	
2017	(India) Anand Pawar	(Denmark) Irina Amalie Andersen	(New Zealand) Oliver Leydon-Davis (Denmark) Lasse Mølhede	(Germany) Cisita Joity Jansen (Germany) Birgit Overzier	(Finland) Anton Kaisti (Finland) Jenny Nyström	
2018	(Malaysia) Cheam June Wei	(Denmark) Julie Dawall Jakobsen	(India) Arun George (India) Sanyam Shukla	(Chinese Taipei) Chang Ya-lan (Chinese Taipei) Cheng Wen-hsing	(France) Delphine Delrue (France) Thom Gicquel	
2019	(India) Harsheel Dani	(Denmark) Line Christophersen	(Denmark) Daniel Lundgaard (Denmark) Mathias Thyrri	(Denmark) Amalie Magelund (Denmark) Freja Ravn	(Denmark) Mathias Thyrri (Denmark) Elisa Melgaard	
2020	Cancelled (Note: This tournament, originally to be played from 8–11 April, was later cancelled due to the COVID-19 pandemic in the Netherlands.)					
2021	Cancelled (Note: This tournament, originally to be played from 15–18 April, was later cancelled due to the COVID-19 pandemic in the Netherlands.)					
2022	(Denmark) Magnus Johannesen	(Malaysia) Myisha Mohd Khairul	(Denmark) Rasmus Kjær (Denmark) Frederik Søgaard	(Hong Kong) Ng Tsz Yau (Hong Kong) Tsang Hiu Yan	(Hong Kong) Lee Chun Hei (Hong Kong) Ng Tsz Yau	
2023	(Belgium) Julien Carraggi	(Chinese Taipei) Huang Yu-hsun	(Japan) Kazuhiro Ichikawa (Japan) Daiki Umayahara	(Chinese Taipei) Hsu Yin-hui (Chinese Taipei) Lee Chih-chen	(Australia) Kenneth Choo (Australia) Gronya Somerville	
2024	(Denmark) Mads Juel Møller	(India) Isharani Baruah	(England) Rory Easton (England) Alex Green	(India) Ashwini Bhat (India) Shikha Gautam	(England) Rory Easton (England) Lizzie Tolman	
2025	Cancelled (Note: This tournament, originally to be played from 13–16 March, was later cancelled.)					

== Performances by nation ==
As of 2024 edition

Pos	Nation	MS	WS	MD	WD	XD	Total
1	Denmark	8	4	9.5	3	8	32.5
2	Germany	4	4	3	4	3	18
3	Netherlands	1	5		6	1	13
4	England			1.5	1	3	5.5
5	France	1		2		2	5
5	India	2	1	1	1		5
5	Poland	1	1	1	1	1	5
8	Bulgaria		1	1	1		3
8	Chinese Taipei		1		2		3
8	Japan			1	2		3
8	Malaysia	1	1	1			3
12	Belgium	1	1				2
12	Hong Kong				1	1	2
12	Russia				1	1	2
12	Spain	1	1				2
12	Ukraine	1	1				2
17	New Zealand			1.5			1.5
17	Scotland		1	0.5			1.5
19	Australia					1	1
19	China	1					1
19	Estonia		1				1
19	Finland					1	1
19	Indonesia	1					1
19	Sweden					1	1
Total		23	23	23	23	23	115

== Erik Meijs Award ==
In memory of Erik Meijs the organization has created an Erik Meijs Award to the Most Sportsman Player of the Tournament. Erik Meijs was the 2016 Dutch national champion who died after being involved in a tragic traffic accident in Germany in November 2017.

Year	Winner
2018	(England) Toby Penty
2019	(Denmark) Mathias Thyrri

== See also ==
- Dutch Open
