= 2014 Russia Open Grand Prix =

Tournament details
- Dates: 22–27 July 2014
- Level: Grand Prix
- Total prize money: US$50,000
- Venue: Sports Hall Olympic
- Location: Vladivostok, Russia

Champions
- Men's singles: (Russia) Vladimir Ivanov
- Women's singles: (Japan) Aya Ohori
- Men's doubles: (Japan) Kenta Kazuno (Japan) Kazushi Yamada
- Women's doubles: (Japan) Yuriko Miki (Japan) Koharu Yonemoto
- Mixed doubles: (Japan) Ryota Taohata (Japan) Misato Aratama

The 2014 Russia Open Grand Prix was the thirteenth grand prix gold and grand prix tournament of the 2014 BWF Grand Prix Gold and Grand Prix. The tournament was held in Sports Hall Olympic, Vladivostok, Russia July 22 until July 27, 2014 and had a total purse of US$50,000.

== Men's singles ==
=== Seeds ===
1. (Russia) Vladimir Ivanov
2. (Russia) Vladimir Malkov
3. (Finland) Ville Lang
4. (Japan) Kazumasa Sakai
5. (Malaysia) Zulfadli Zulkiffli
6. (India) B. Sai Praneeth
7. (Czech Republic) Petr Koukal
8. (United States) Howard Shu

=== Finals ===
Semifinals
1	(Russia) Vladimir Ivanov	21	21
4	(Japan) Kazumasa Sakai	12	12
(Japan) Riichi Takeshita	21	21
2	(Russia) Vladimir Malkov	16	19

Final
1	(Russia) Vladimir Ivanov	18	21	21
(Japan) Riichi Takeshita	21	5	17

=== Top half ===
Round 1
(Russia) Alexander Butovetstkiy
(Bulgaria) Blagovest Kisyov	WO

Round 2
1	(Russia) Vladimir Ivanov	21	21
(Russia) Anton Ivanov	10	12
(Russia) Rodion Alimov	23	14	15
(Russia) Pavel Kotsarenko	21	21	21
5	(Malaysia) Zulfadli Zulkiffli	21	21
(Russia) Alexandr Kozyrev	11	9
(Russia) Anatoliy Yartsev	21	18	21
(Finland) Eetu Heino	18	21	12
4	(Japan) Kazumasa Sakai	21	21
(Russia) Artem Debenev	6	3
(Russia) Vladimir Rusin	21	21
(Russia) Roman Dvornikov	17	9
8	(United States) Howard Shu	21	11	21
(Russia) Nikita Khakimov	18	21	18
(Slovakia) Jarolim Vicen	WO
(Russia) Alexander Butovetstkiy

Round 3
1	(Russia) Vladimir Ivanov	21	21
(Russia) Pavel Kotsarenko	10	15
5	(Malaysia) Zulfadli Zulkiffli	21	21
(Russia) Anatoliy Yartsev	10	13
4	(Japan) Kazumasa Sakai	21	21
(Russia) Vladimir Rusin	17	9
8	(United States) Howard Shu
(Russia) Alexander Butovetstkiy	WO

Quarterfinals
1	(Russia) Vladimir Ivanov	21	21
5	(Malaysia) Zulfadli Zulkiffli	12	12
Semifinals
1	(Russia) Vladimir Ivanov
4	(Japan) Kazumasa Sakai
4	(Japan) Kazumasa Sakai	21	21
8	(United States) Howard Shu	12	15

=== Bottom half ===
Round 1
(Russia) Viktor Timoshok	12	9
(Slovenia) Iztok Utrosa	21	21

Round 2
(Slovenia) Iztok Utrosa	19	18
(Japan) Riichi Takeshita	21	21
(Russia) Denis Grachev
7	(Czech Republic) Petr Koukal	WO
(Russia) Andrey Jdanov	5	17
(Russia) Andrey Parokhodin	21	21
(Russia) Sergey Sirant	15	18
3	(Finland) Ville Lang	21	21
(Russia) Mikhail Nesterenko	7	3
(Russia) Stanislav Pukhov	21	21
(Lithuania) Kestutis Navickas	WO
6	(India) B. Sai Praneeth
(Russia) Grigoriy Martynenko	9	15
(Japan) Yosei Yamaguchi	21	21
(Russia) Vladimir Shipilenko	11	7
2	(Russia) Vladimir Malkov	21	21

Round 3
(Japan) Riichi Takeshita	21	5	21
(Russia) Denis Grachev	15	21	17
(Russia) Andrey Parokhodin	19	16
3	(Finland) Ville Lang	21	21
(Russia) Stanislav Pukhov	7	3
6	(India) B. Sai Praneeth	21	21
(Japan) Yosei Yamaguchi	21	12	18
2	(Russia) Vladimir Malkov	15	21	21

Quarterfinals
(Japan) Riichi Takeshita	21	21
3	(Finland) Ville Lang	14	7
Semifinals
(Japan) Riichi Takeshita
2	(Russia) Vladimir Malkov
6	(India) B. Sai Praneeth	21	17
2	(Russia) Vladimir Malkov	23	21

== Women's singles ==
=== Seeds ===
1. (Russia) Natalia Perminova
2. (Bulgaria) Stefani Stoeva
3. (Russia) Olga Golovanova
4. (Japan) Yui Hashimoto

=== Finals ===
Semifinals
(Japan) Nozomi Okuhara	21	19	18
(Japan) Aya Ohori	11	21	21
(Japan) Kaori Imabeppu	16	17
(Japan) Shizuka Uchida	21	21

Final
(Japan) Aya Ohori	21	21
(Japan) Shizuka Uchida	19	4

=== Top half ===
Round 1
1	(Russia) Natalia Perminova
BYE
(Japan) Yuka Kusunose	21	21
(Russia) Evgenia Dimova	16	10
(Japan) Nozomi Okuhara	21	21
(Russia) Olesia Kister	2	7
(Russia) Evgeniya Kosetskaya	21	21
(Indonesia) Josephine Leonila	9	10
4	(Japan) Yui Hashimoto	21	21
(Russia) Vitaliya Chiginstseva	9	8
(Russia) Daria Radchenko	13	7
(United States) Bo Rong	21	21
(Russia) Elena Komendrovskaja	12	16
(India) Tanvi Lad	21	21
(Russia) Victoria Slobodjanuk	14	15
(Japan) Aya Ohori	21	21

Round 2
1	(Russia) Natalia Perminova	19	11
(Japan) Yuka Kusunose	21	21
(Japan) Nozomi Okuhara	21	21
(Russia) Evgeniya Kosetskaya	10	14
4	(Japan) Yui Hashimoto	21	21
(United States) Bo Rong	9	13
(India) Tanvi Lad	14	6
(Japan) Aya Ohori	21	21

Quarterfinals
(Japan) Yuka Kusunose	18	19
(Japan) Nozomi Okuhara	21	21
4	(Japan) Yui Hashimoto	22	8
(Japan) Aya Ohori	24	21

Semifinals
(Japan) Nozomi Okuhara
(Japan) Aya Ohori

=== Bottom half ===
Round 1
(Russia) Kristina Averkina	12	18
(Japan) Sayaka Sato	21	21
(Russia) Ksenia Polikarpova
(United States) Iris Wang	WO
(Japan) Kaori Imabeppu	21	21
(Russia) Anastasia Ronzhina	9	8
(Russia) Valeriia Makkoveeva	7	5
3	(Russia) Olga Golovanova	21	21
(India) Arundhati Pantawane	21	21
(Russia) Alina Davletova	11	7
(Russia) Victoria Dergunova	4	10
(Japan) Shizuka Uchida	21	21
(Russia) Ekaterina Bolotova	21	23
(Russia) Anastasia Chervyakova	17	21
BYE
2	(Bulgaria) Stefani Stoeva

Round 2
(Japan) Sayaka Sato
(Russia) Ksenia Polikarpova	WO
(Japan) Kaori Imabeppu	21	21
3	(Russia) Olga Golovanova	8	19
(India) Arundhati Pantawane	21	10	19
(Japan) Shizuka Uchida	10	21	21
(Russia) Ekaterina Bolotova	10	14
2	(Bulgaria) Stefani Stoeva	21	21

Quarterfinals
(Japan) Sayaka Sato	21	7	19
(Japan) Kaori Imabeppu	19	21	21
(Japan) Shizuka Uchida	21	21
2	(Bulgaria) Stefani Stoeva	11	15

Semifinals
(Japan) Kaori Imabeppu
(Japan) Shizuka Uchida

== Men's doubles ==
=== Seeds ===
1. (Russia) Vladimir Ivanov / Ivan Sozonov
2. (Russia) Nikita Khakimov / Vasily Kuznetsov

=== Draw ===
Round 1
1	(Russia) Vladimir Ivanov (Russia) Ivan Sozonov
BYE
(Russia) Evgenij Dremin (Russia) Sergey Lunev	21	22	21
(Russia) Konstantin Abramov (Russia) Alexandr Zinchenko	12	21	11
(Russia) Andrey Jdanov (Russia) Viktor Timoshok	9	8
(Russia) Rodion Alimov (Russia) Alexandr Kozyrev	21	21
(Japan) Kenta Kazuno (Japan) Kazushi Yamada	21	21
(Russia) Pavel Kotsarenko (Russia) Grigoriy Martinenko	6	5
(Russia) Mikhail Nesterenko (Russia) Vladimir Shipilenko	3	4
(Japan) Hiroyuki Saeki (Japan) Ryota Taohata	21	21
(Russia) Denis Grachev (Russia) Sergey Sirant	21	21
(Russia) Vladimir Rusin (Russia) Iiya Zdanov	16	14
(Japan) Takuto Inoue (Japan) Yuki Kaneko	12	23	21
(Russia) Rodion Kargaev (Russia) Anatoliy Yartsev	21	14	17
(Russia) Artem Derbenev (Russia) Roman Dvornikov	9	11
2	(Russia) Nikita Khakimov (Russia) Vasily Kuznetsov	21	21

Quarterfinals
1	(Russia) Vladimir Ivanov (Russia) Ivan Sozonov	21	21
(Russia) Evgenij Dremin (Russia) Sergey Lunev	12	16
(Russia) Rodion Alimov (Russia) Alexandr Kozyrev	9	11
(Japan) Kenta Kazuno (Japan) Kazushi Yamada	21	21
(Japan) Hiroyuki Saeki (Japan) Ryota Taohata	21	21
(Russia) Denis Grachev (Russia) Sergey Sirant	14	16
(Japan) Takuto Inoue (Japan) Yuki Kaneko	15	21	21
2	(Russia) Nikita Khakimov (Russia) Vasily Kuznetsov	21	18	12

Semifinals
1	(Russia) Vladimir Ivanov (Russia) Ivan Sozonov	15	21	16
(Japan) Kenta Kazuno (Japan) Kazushi Yamada	21	19	21
(Japan) Hiroyuki Saeki (Japan) Ryota Taohata	18	18
(Japan) Takuto Inoue (Japan) Yuki Kaneko	21	21

Final
(Japan) Kenta Kazuno (Japan) Kazushi Yamada	19	22	21
(Japan) Takuto Inoue (Japan) Yuki Kaneko	21	20	13

== Women's doubles ==
=== Seeds ===
1. (Bulgaria) Gabriela Stoeva / Stefani Stoeva
2. (Japan) Misato Aratama / Megumi Taruno

=== Draw ===
Round 1
1	(Bulgaria) Gabriela Stoeva (Bulgaria) Stefani Stoeva
BYE
(Russia) Alina Davletova (Russia) Anastasia Ronzhina	11	13
(Japan) Yuriko Miki (Japan) Koharu Yonemoto	21	21
(Russia) Anastasia Chervyakova (Russia) Nina Vislova	21	21
(Russia) Valeriia Makkoveeva (Russia) Daria Radchenko	1	6
(Russia) Evgeniya Kosetskaya (Russia) Ksenia Polikarpova	19	15
(Japan) Ayane Kurihara (Japan) Naru Shinoya	21	21
(Japan) Arisa Higashino (Japan) Chisato Hoshi	21	21
(Russia) Victoria Dergunova (Russia) Olga Morozova	15	12
(Russia) Tatjana Bibik (Russia) Ekaterina Bolotova	10	20
(Japan) Mayu Matsumoto (Japan) Wakana Nagahara	21	22
(Russia) Kristina Averkina (Russia) Vitaliya Chigintseva	11	20
(Russia) Maria Shegurova (Russia) Victoria Slobodjanuk	21	22
(Russia) Irina Khlebko (Russia) Elena Komendrovskaja	14	16
2	(Japan) Misato Aratama (Japan) Megumi Taruno	21	21

Quarterfinals
1	(Bulgaria) Gabriela Stoeva (Bulgaria) Stefani Stoeva	21	18	12
(Japan) Yuriko Miki (Japan) Koharu Yonemoto	17	21	21
(Russia) Anastasia Chervyakova (Russia) Nina Vislova	21	14	21
(Japan) Ayane Kurihara (Japan) Naru Shinoya	19	21	23
(Japan) Arisa Higashino (Japan) Chisato Hoshi	17	19
(Japan) Mayu Matsumoto (Japan) Wakana Nagahara	21	21
(Russia) Maria Shegurova (Russia) Victoria Slobodjanuk	8	14
2	(Japan) Misato Aratama (Japan) Megumi Taruno	21	21

Semifinals
(Japan) Yuriko Miki (Japan) Koharu Yonemoto	16	16
(Japan) Ayane Kurihara (Japan) Naru Shinoya	21	21
(Japan) Mayu Matsumoto (Japan) Wakana Nagahara	21	21
2	(Japan) Misato Aratama (Japan) Megumi Taruno	15	18

Final
(Japan) Yuriko Miki (Japan) Koharu Yonemoto	21	21
(Japan) Mayu Matsumoto (Japan) Wakana Nagahara	17	7

== Mixed doubles ==
=== Seeds ===
1. (Russia) Anatoliy Yartsev / Evgeniya Kosetskaya
2. (Russia) Evgenij Dremin / Evgenia Dimova
3. (Russia) Rodion Kargaev / Ekaterina Bolotova
4. (Russia) Vasily Kuznetsov / Victoria Slobodjanuk

=== Finals ===
Semifinals
(Russia) Ivan Sozonov (Russia) Olga Morozova	18	21	21
3	(Russia) Rodion Kargaev (Russia) Ekaterina Bolotova	21	14	16
(Japan) Ryota Taohata (Japan) Misato Aratama	22	21
2	(Russia) Evgenij Dremin (Russia) Evgenia Dimova	20	14

Final
(Russia) Ivan Sozonov (Russia) Olga Morozova	12	10
(Japan) Ryota Taohata (Japan) Misato Aratama	21	21

=== Top half ===
Round 1
(Russia) Viktor Timoshok (Russia) Olesia Kister	7	7
(Russia) Alexandr Zinchenko (Russia) Irina Khlebko	21	21

Round 2
1	(Russia) Anatoliy Yartsev (Russia) Evgeniya Kosetskaya	21	21
(Russia) Rodion Alimov (Russia) Alina Davletova	16	15
(Russia) Ivan Sozonov (Russia) Olga Morozova	21	21
(Russia) Mikhail Nesterenko (Russia) Daria Radchenko	9	4
3	(Russia) Rodion Kargaev (Russia) Ekaterina Bolotova	21	21
(Russia) Andrey Parokhodin (Russia) Tatjana Bibik	17	13
(Russia) Konstantin Abramov (Russia) Victoria Dergunova	21	21
(Russia) Alexandr Zinchenko (Russia) Irina Khlebko	18	18

Quarterfinals
1	(Russia) Anatoliy Yartsev (Russia) Evgeniya Kosetskaya	19	21	8
(Russia) Ivan Sozonov (Russia) Olga Morozova	21	19	21
3	(Russia) Rodion Kargaev (Russia) Ekaterina Bolotova	21	21
(Russia) Konstantin Abramov (Russia) Victoria Dergunova	17	16

Semifinals
(Russia) Ivan Sozonov (Russia) Olga Morozova
3	(Russia) Rodion Kargaev (Russia) Ekaterina Bolotova

=== Bottom half ===
Round 1
(Russia) Nikolaj Nikolaenko (Russia) Maria Shegurova	6	11
(Japan) Ryota Taohata (Japan) Misato Aratama	21	21
(Russia) Pavel Kotsarenko (Russia) Anastasia Ronzhina	21	21
(Russia) Grigoriy Martynenko (Russia) Kristina Averkina	18	18

Round 2
(Japan) Ryota Taohata (Japan) Misato Aratama	21	21
(Russia) Roman Dvornikov (Russia) Victoria Dereviyagina	3	3
(Russia) Vladimir Shipilenko (Russia) Valeriia Makkoveeva	11	3
4	(Russia) Vasily Kuznetsov (Russia) Victoria Slobodjanuk	21	21
(Russia) Pavel Kotsarenko (Russia) Anastasia Ronzhina	16	8
(Russia) Iiya Zdanov (Russia) Elena Komendrovskaja	21	21
(Russia) Vladimir Ivanov (Russia) Anastasia Chervyakova	21	29	15
2	(Russia) Evgenij Dremin (Russia) Evgenia Dimova	10	30	21

Quarterfinals
(Japan) Ryota Taohata (Japan) Misato Aratama	21	21
4	(Russia) Vasily Kuznetsov (Russia) Victoria Slobodjanuk	9	18
(Russia) Iiya Zdanov (Russia) Elena Komendrovskaja	16	9
(Russia) Evgenij Dremin (Russia) Evgenia Dimova	21	21

Semifinals
(Japan) Ryota Taohata (Japan) Misato Aratama
2	(Russia) Evgenij Dremin (Russia) Evgenia Dimova

Preceded by 2014 Chinese Taipei Open Grand Prix Gold	BWF Grand Prix Gold and Grand Prix; 2014 BWF Season	Succeeded by 2014 Brazil Open Grand Prix
