= 2013 Russia Open Grand Prix =

Tournament details
- Dates: 24 September 2013 – 29 September 2013
- Level: Grand Prix
- Total prize money: US$50,000
- Venue: Sports Hall Olympic
- Location: Vladivostok, Russia

Champions
- Men's singles: (Russia) Vladimir Ivanov
- Women's singles: (Japan) Aya Ohori
- Men's doubles: (Russia) Vladimir Ivanov (Russia) Ivan Sozonov
- Women's doubles: (Russia) Anastasia Chervaykova (Russia) Nina Vislova
- Mixed doubles: (Russia) Ivan Sozonov (Russia) Tatjana Bibik

The 2013 Russia Open Grand Prix was the eleventh grand prix gold and grand prix tournament of the 2013 BWF Grand Prix Gold and Grand Prix. The tournament was held in Sports Hall Olympic, Vladivostok, Russia September 24 until September 29, 2013, and had a total purse of $50,000.

== Men's singles ==
=== Seeds ===
1. (Russia) Vladimir Ivanov (champion)
2. (France) Brice Leverdez (semi-final)
3. (Israel) Misha Zilberman (quarter-final)
4. (Russia) Vladimir Malkov (quarter-final)
5. (Malaysia) Zulfadli Zulkiffli (semi-final)
6. (Slovenia) Iztok Utrosa (third round)
7. (Slovakia) Jarolim Vicen (third round)
8. (Russia) Nikita Khakimov (quarter-final)

=== Finals ===
Quarterfinals
1	(Russia) Vladimir Ivanov	21	21
(Russia) Vadim Novoselov	11	7
3	(Israel) Misha Zilberman	15	11
5	(Malaysia) Zulfadli Zulkiffli	21	21
(Japan) Kenta Nishimoto	21	25
4	(Russia) Vladimir Malkov	12	23
8	(Russia) Nikita Khakimov	13	14
2	(France) Brice Leverdez	21	21

Semifinals
1	(Russia) Vladimir Ivanov	21	16	25
5	(Malaysia) Zulfadli Zulkiffli	15	21	23
(Japan) Kenta Nishimoto	21	20	21
2	(France) Brice Leverdez	10	22	9

Final
1	(Russia) Vladimir Ivanov	21	15	21
(Japan) Kenta Nishimoto	17	21	14

=== Top half ===
==== Section 1 ====
First Round
1	(Russia) V Ivanov
BYE
(Russia) G Kosenko
BYE
(Russia) S Molodov
BYE
(Russia) R Varabyou
BYE

Second Round
1	(Russia) V Ivanov	21	21
(Russia) G Kosenko	11	10
(Russia) S Molodov	23	21
(Russia) R Varabyou	21	13

Third Round
1	(Russia) V Ivanov	21	21
(Russia) S Molodov	14	10

==== Section 2 ====
First Round
7	(Slovakia) J Vicen
BYE
(Russia) A Zolotuev
BYE
(Russia) A Loginov
BYE
(Russia) V Novoselov
BYE

Second Round
7	(Slovakia) J Vicen	21	21
(Russia) A Zolotuev	9	10
(Russia) A Loginov	wo
(Russia) V Novoselov

Third Round
7	(Slovakia) J Vicen	17	15
(Russia) V Novoselov	21	21

==== Section 3 ====
First Round
3	(Israel) M Zilberman
BYE
(Russia) A Yartsev
BYE
(Russia) A Dolotov
BYE
(Russia) V Timoshok
BYE

Second Round
3	(Israel) M Zilberman	19	21	21
(Russia) A Yartsev	21	16	13
(Russia) A Dolotov	21	21
(Russia) V Timoshok	5	7

Third Round
3	(Israel) M Zilberman	21	21
(Russia) A Dolotov	11	4

==== Section 4 ====
First Round
5	(Malaysia) Z Zulkiffli
BYE
(Russia) D Riabov
BYE
(Russia) D Grachev
BYE
(Russia) A Karpov	22	21
(India) K Dhindhwal	20	11

Second Round
5	(Malaysia) Z Zulkiffli	21	21
(Russia) D Riabov	13	6
(Russia) D Grachev	21	21
(Russia) A Karpov	15	11

Third Round
5	(Malaysia) Z Zulkiffli	21	21
(Russia) D Grachev	8	9

=== Bottom half ===
==== Section 5 ====
First Round
(Russia) A Butovetstkiy	12	10
(Japan) K Nishimoto	21	21
BYE
(Russia) Y Egerev
BYE
(Russia) R Kulaga
BYE
6	(Slovenia) I Utrosa

Second Round
(Japan) K Nishimoto	21	21
(Russia) Y Egerev	12	11
(Russia) R Kulaga	9	10
6	(Slovenia) I Utrosa	21	21

Third Round
(Japan) K Nishimoto	21	21
6	(Slovenia) I Utrosa	11	11

==== Section 6 ====
First Round
BYE
(Russia) K Abramov
BYE
(Russia) D Balandin
BYE
(Russia) S Sirant
BYE
4	(Russia) V Malkov

Second Round
(Russia) K Abramov	23	10	10
(Russia) D Balandin	21	21	21
(Russia) S Sirant	14	13
4	(Russia) V Malkov	21	21

Third Round
(Russia) D Balandin	12	13
4	(Russia) V Malkov	21	21

==== Section 7 ====
First Round
(Russia) G Martynenko	16	21	16
(Russia) P Kotsarenko	21	19	21
BYE
(Russia) A Derbenev
BYE
(Russia) A Jdanov
BYE
8	(Russia) N Khakimov

Second Round
(Russia) P Kotsarenko	21	21
(Russia) A Derbenev	16	11
(Russia) A Jdanov	8	4
8	(Russia) N Khakimov	21	21

Third Round
(Russia) P Kotsarenko	4	11
8	(Russia) N Khakimov	21	21

==== Section 8 ====
First Round
BYE
(Russia) E Karpov
BYE
(Russia) A Ivanov
BYE
(Russia) A Parokhodin
BYE
2	(France) B Leverdez

Second Round
(Russia) E Karpov	10	9
(Russia) A Ivanov	21	21
(Russia) A Parokhodin	14	21	16
2	(France) B Leverdez	21	15	21

Third Round
(Russia) A Ivanov	11	17
2	(France) B Leverdez	21	21

== Women's singles ==
=== Seeds ===
1. (Russia) Olga Golovanova (semi-final)
2. (Russia) Natalia Perminova (quarter-final)
3. (Russia) Ksenia Polikarpova (final)
4. (Japan) Aya Ohori (champion)

=== Finals ===
Semifinals
1	(Russia) Olga Golovanova	19	11
3	(Russia) Ksenia Polikarpova	21	21
4	(Japan) Aya Ohori	21	21
(Russia) Tatjana Bibik	14	16

Final
3	(Russia) Ksenia Polikarpova	5	10
4	(Japan) Aya Ohori	21	21

=== Top half ===
==== Section 1 ====
First Round
1	(Russia) O Golovanova
BYE
(Russia) P Makkoveeva
BYE
(Russia) E Komendrovskaja
BYE
(Russia) E Kut	20	7
(Russia) V Dergunova	22	21

Second Round
1	(Russia) O Golovanova	21	21
(Russia) P Makkoveeva	10	10
(Russia) E Komendrovskaja	21	10	21
(Russia) V Dergunova	14	21	18

Quarterfinals
1	(Russia) O Golovanova	21	16	21
(Russia) E Komendrovskaja	15	21	18

==== Section 2 ====
First Round
3	(Russia) K Polikarpova
BYE
(Japan) A Yamaguchi	wo
(Russia) O Lipkina
(Russia) E Kosetskaya
BYE
(Russia) E Dimova	21	21
(Russia) S Kononykhina	7	13

Second Round
3	(Russia) K Polikarpova	21	21
(Russia) O Lipkina	13	10
(Russia) E Kosetskaya	15	9
(Russia) E Dimova	21	21

Quarterfinals
3	(Russia) K Polikarpova	21	21
(Russia) E Dimova	15	16

=== Bottom half ===
==== Section 3 ====
First Round
(Russia) E Diehl	wo
(Russia) M Shegurova
BYE
(Russia) A Chervaykova
(Russia) V Chigintseva	21	21
(Russia) J Zapolskaya	19	12
BYE
4	(Japan) A Ohori

Second Round
(Russia) M Shegurova	15	8
(Russia) A Chervaykova	21	21
(Russia) V Chigintseva	2	7
4	(Japan) A Ohori	21	21

Quarterfinals
(Russia) A Chervaykova	10	6
4	(Japan) A Ohori	21	21

==== Section 4 ====
First Round
(Russia) T Bibik	21	16	21
(Russia) V Slobodjanuk	14	21	9
BYE
(Russia) V Vorobeva
(Russia) K Averkina	21	15	20
(Russia) E Bolotova	15	21	22
BYE
2	(Russia) N Perminova

Second Round
(Russia) T Bibik	21	21
(Russia) V Vorobeva	10	16
(Russia) E Bolotova	4	11
2	(Russia) N Perminova	21	21

Quarterfinals
(Russia) T Bibik	21	21
2	(Russia) N Perminova	11	12

== Men's doubles ==
=== Seeds ===
1. (Russia) Vladimir Ivanov / Ivan Sozonov (champion)
2. (Russia) Nikita Khakimov / Vasily Kuznetsov (semi-final)

=== Finals ===
Semifinals
1	(Russia) Vladimir Ivanov (Russia) Ivan Sozonov	21	21
(Japan) Keiichiro Matsui (Japan) Koshun Miura	16	9
(Russia) Andrej Ashmarin (Russia) Vitalij Durkin	21	21
2	(Russia) Nikita Khakimov (Russia) Vasily Kuznetsov	16	17

Final
1	(Russia) Vladimir Ivanov (Russia) Ivan Sozonov	21	21
(Russia) Andrej Ashmarin (Russia) Vitalij Durkin	16	19

=== Top half ===
First Round
1	(Russia) V Ivanov (Russia) I Sozonov
BYE
(Russia) G Kosenko (Russia) R Varabyou	23	21	19
(Russia) S Molodov (Russia) D Riabov	25	17	21
(Russia) E Dremin (Russia) S Lunev	21	21
(Russia) K Abramov (Russia) Y Egerev	17	15
(Japan) K Matsui (Japan) K Miura	16	22	21
(Russia) V Malkov (Russia) V Novoselov	21	20	17

Quarter Final
1	(Russia) V Ivanov (Russia) I Sozonov	21	21
(Russia) S Molodov (Russia) D Riabov	5	6
(Russia) E Dremin (Russia) S Lunev	19	18
(Japan) K Matsui (Japan) K Miura	21	21

Semi Final
1	(Russia) V Ivanov (Russia) I Sozonov	21	21
(Japan) K Matsui (Japan) K Miura	16	9

=== Bottom half ===
First Round
(Russia) E Karpov (Russia) P Kotsarenko	12	4
(Russia) A Ashmarin (Russia) V Durkin	21	21
(Russia) A Dolotov (Russia) A Zinchenko	18	16
(Russia) R Kargaev (Russia) A Yartsev	21	21
(Russia) A Jdanov (Russia) V Timoshok	8	14
(Russia) A Butovetstkiy (Russia) G Martynenko	21	21
(Russia) A Derbenev (Russia) A Zolotuev	5	10
2	(Russia) N Khakimov (Russia) V Kuznetsov	21	21

Quarter Final
(Russia) A Ashmarin (Russia) V Durkin	21	21
(Russia) R Kargaev (Russia) A Yartsev	10	14
(Russia) A Butovetstkiy (Russia) G Martynenko	12	8
2	(Russia) N Khakimov (Russia) V Kuznetsov	21	21

Semi Final
(Russia) A Ashmarin (Russia) V Durkin	21	21
2	(Russia) N Khakimov (Russia) V Kuznetsov	16	17

== Women's doubles ==
=== Seeds ===
1. (Russia) Irina Khlebko / Ksenia Polikarpova (final)
2. (Russia) Elena Komendrovskaja / Maria Shegurova (semi-final)

=== Finals ===
Semifinals
1	(Russia) Irina Khlebko (Russia) Ksenia Polikarpova	24	17	22
(Russia) Olga Golovanova (Russia) Viktoriia Vorobeva	22	21	20
(Russia) Nina Vislova (Russia) Anastasia Chervaykova	21	21
2	(Russia) Elena Komendrovskaja (Russia) Maria Shegurova	7	12

Final
1	(Russia) Irina Khlebko (Russia) Ksenia Polikarpova	16	18
(Russia) Nina Vislova (Russia) Anastasia Chervaykova	21	21

=== Top half ===
First Round
1	(Russia) I Khlebko (Russia) K Polikarpova
BYE
(Russia) T Bibik (Russia) E Bolotova
BYE
(Russia) V Chigintseva (Russia) K Nazarova
BYE
(Russia) O Golovanova (Russia) V Vorobeva
BYE

Quarter Final
1	(Russia) I Khlebko (Russia) K Polikarpova	21	21
(Russia) T Bibik (Russia) E Bolotova	12	8
(Russia) V Chigintseva (Russia) K Nazarova	7	9
(Russia) O Golovanova (Russia) V Vorobeva	21	21

Semi Final
1	(Russia) I Khlebko (Russia) K Polikarpova	24	17	22
(Russia) O Golovanova (Russia) V Vorobeva	22	21	20

=== Bottom half ===
First Round
(Russia) V Dergunova (Russia) O Morozova	16	16
(Russia) N Vislova (Russia) A Chervaykova	21	21
BYE
(Russia) K Averkina (Russia) E Kut
BYE
(Russia) S Kononykhina (Russia) O Lipkina
BYE
2	(Russia) E Komendrovskaja (Russia) M Shegurova

Quarter Final
(Russia) N Vislova (Russia) A Chervaykova	21	21
(Russia) K Averkina (Russia) E Kut	10	6
(Russia) S Kononykhina (Russia) O Lipkina	10	13
2	(Russia) E Komendrovskaja (Russia) M Shegurova	21	21

Semi Final
(Russia) N Vislova (Russia) A Chervaykova	21	21
2	(Russia) E Komendrovskaja (Russia) M Shegurova	7	12

== Mixed doubles ==
=== Seeds ===
1. (Russia) Vitalij Durkin / Nina Vislova
2. (Russia) Alexandr Zinchenko / Olga Morozova (second round)
3. (Russia) Vadim Novoselov / Julia Zapolskaya (quarter-final)
4. (Russia) Ryhor Varabyou / Viktoriia Vorobeva (second round)

=== Finals ===
Semifinals
1	(Russia) Vitalij Durkin (Russia) Nina Vislova	21	21
(Russia) Dmitry Balandin (Russia) Karina Nazarova	11	7
(Russia) Evgenij Dremin (Russia) Evgenia Dimova	21	13	16
(Russia) Ivan Sozonov (Russia) Tatjana Bibik	12	21	21

Final
1	(Russia) Vitalij Durkin (Russia) Nina Vislova
(Russia) Ivan Sozonov (Russia) Tatjana Bibik

=== Top half ===
==== Section 1 ====
First Round
1	(Russia) V Durkin (Russia) N Vislova
BYE
(Russia) G Kosenko (Russia) O Lipkina
BYE
(Russia) K Abramov (Russia) I Khlebko
BYE
(Russia) R Kargaev (Russia) A Chervaykova
BYE

Second Round
1	(Russia) V Durkin (Russia) N Vislova	21	21
(Russia) G Kosenko (Russia) O Lipkina	16	15
(Russia) K Abramov (Russia) I Khlebko	21	16	21
(Russia) R Kargaev (Russia) A Chervaykova	16	21	15

Quarterfinals
1	(Russia) V Durkin (Russia) N Vislova	21	21
(Russia) K Abramov (Russia) I Khlebko	12	14

==== Section 2 ====
First Round
3	(Russia) V Novoselov (Russia) J Zapolskaya
BYE
(Russia) S Molodov (Russia) E Kut
BYE
(Russia) D Balandin (Russia) K Nazarova
BYE
(Russia) P Kotsarenko (Russia) K Averkina
BYE

Second Round
3	(Russia) V Novoselov (Russia) J Zapolskaya	21	23
(Russia) S Molodov (Russia) E Kut	19	21
(Russia) D Balandin (Russia) K Nazarova	21	21
(Russia) P Kotsarenko (Russia) K Averkina	17	19

Quarterfinals
3	(Russia) V Novoselov (Russia) J Zapolskaya	23	21	15
(Russia) D Balandin (Russia) K Nazarova	25	15	21

=== Bottom half ===
==== Section 3 ====
First Round
(Russia) A Yartsev (Russia) E Kosetskaya	21	21
(Russia) R Kulaga (Russia) V Dergunova	14	18
BYE
(Russia) A Derbenev (Russia) P Makkoveeva
BYE
(Russia) E Dremin (Russia) E Dimova
BYE
4	(Russia) R Varabyou (Russia) V Vorobeva

Second Round
(Russia) A Yartsev (Russia) E Kosetskaya	21	21
(Russia) A Derbenev (Russia) P Makkoveeva	5	4
(Russia) E Dremin (Russia) E Dimova	18	21	21
4	(Russia) R Varabyou (Russia) V Vorobeva	21	12	7

Quarterfinals
(Russia) A Yartsev (Russia) E Kosetskaya	22	17	8
(Russia) E Dremin (Russia) E Dimova	20	21	21

==== Section 4 ====
First Round
BYE
(Russia) A Ashmarin (Russia) E Bolotova
BYE
(Russia) D Riabov (Russia) V Chigintseva
BYE
(Russia) I Sozonov (Russia) T Bibik
BYE
2	(Russia) A Zinchenko (Russia) O Morozova

Second Round
(Russia) A Ashmarin (Russia) E Bolotova	21	21
(Russia) D Riabov (Russia) V Chigintseva	12	7
(Russia) I Sozonov (Russia) T Bibik	21	19	21
2	(Russia) A Zinchenko (Russia) O Morozova	15	21	16

Quarterfinals
(Russia) A Ashmarin (Russia) E Bolotova	20	21	19
(Russia) I Sozonov (Russia) T Bibik	22	18	21

Preceded by 2013 Indonesia Open Grand Prix Gold	BWF Grand Prix Gold and Grand Prix; 2013 season	Succeeded by 2013 London Grand Prix Gold
