= 2019 Russian Open (badminton) =

2019 badminton tournament in Vladivostok

Tournament details
- Dates: 16–21 July
- Level: Super 100
- Total prize money: US$75,000
- Venue: Sport Hall Olympic
- Location: Vladivostok, Russia

Champions
- Men's singles: (Indonesia) Shesar Hiren Rhustavito
- Women's singles: (Chinese Taipei) Pai Yu-po
- Men's doubles: (Denmark) Mathias Boe (Denmark) Mads Conrad-Petersen
- Women's doubles: (Indonesia) Ni Ketut Mahadewi Istirani (Indonesia) Tania Oktaviani Kusumah
- Mixed doubles: (Indonesia) Adnan Maulana (Indonesia) Mychelle Crhystine Bandaso

The 2019 Russian Open was a badminton tournament which took place at Sport Hall Olympic in Vladivostok, Russia, from 16 to 21 July 2019 and had a total purse of $75,000.

== Tournament ==
The 2019 Russian Open was the fourth Super 100 tournament of the 2019 BWF World Tour and also part of the Russian Open championships, which had been held since 1992. This tournament was organized by the National Badminton Federation of Russia and sanctioned by the BWF.

=== Venue ===
This international tournament was held at Sport Hall Olympic in Vladivostok, Primorsky Krai, Far Eastern Federal District, Russia.

=== Point distribution ===
Below is the point distribution table for each phase of the tournament based on the BWF points system for the BWF Tour Super 100 event.

Winner	Runner-up	3/4	5/8	9/16	17/32	33/64	65/128	129/256
5,500	4,680	3,850	3,030	2,110	1,290	510	240	100

=== Prize money ===
The total prize money for this tournament was US$75,000. Distribution of prize money was in accordance with BWF regulations.

Event	Winner	Finals	Semi-finals	Quarter-finals	Last 16
Singles	$5,625	$2,850	$1,087.50	$450	$262.50
Doubles	$5,925	$2,850	$1,050	$543.75	$281.25

== Men's singles ==
=== Seeds ===
1. (India) Subhankar Dey (third round)
2. (Indonesia) Shesar Hiren Rhustavito (champion)
3. (Singapore) Loh Kean Yew (final)
4. (Indonesia) Ihsan Maulana Mustofa (semi-finals)
5. (Indonesia) Chico Aura Dwi Wardoyo (quarter-finals)
6. (Spain) Pablo Abián (quarter-finals)
7. (Malaysia) Soo Teck Zhi (second round)
8. (Russia) Sergey Sirant (second round)

=== Finals ===
Semi-finals
(Japan) Kodai Naraoka	16	18
3	(Singapore) Loh Kean Yew	21	21
4	(Indonesia) Ihsan Maulana Mustofa	16	18
2	(Indonesia) Shesar Hiren Rhustavito	21	21

Final
3	(Singapore) Loh Kean Yew	17	19
2	(Indonesia) Shesar Hiren Rhustavito	21	21

=== Top half ===
==== Section 1 ====
First Round
(Australia) RZ Yan	21	18	21
(India) M Manjunath	19	21	17
(Republic of Ireland) N Nguyen	21	21
(England) C Ka Lung	5	3

Second Round
1	(India) S Dey	21	21
(England) H S Wong	10	6
(Ukraine) K Leonov
(Japan) K Naraoka	w	/	o
7	(Malaysia) Soo T Z	21	17	14
(Australia) RZ Yan	13	21	21
(Russia) E Kurdyukov	14	14
(Republic of Ireland) N Nguyen	21	21

Third Round
1	(India) S Dey	18	18
(Japan) K Naraoka	21	21
(Australia) RZ Yan	21	10	15
(Republic of Ireland) N Nguyen	19	21	21

Quarter-finals
(Japan) K Naraoka	21	21
(Republic of Ireland) N Nguyen	11	17

==== Section 2 ====
First Round
(Russia) V Shipilenko	21	21	21
(Canada) G Ma	18	23	6
(Russia) D Klimenko	21	18	21
(Russia) I Goncharov	17	21	16
(Canada) J Lam	19	18
(Russia) P Kotsarenko	21	21

Second Round
3	(Singapore) Loh K Y	21	21
(Japan) R Maruo	9	11
(Japan) D Watanabe	21	21
(Russia) V Shipilenko	4	14
5	(Indonesia) C A Dwi Wardoyo	21	21
(Russia) D Klimenko	7	9
(Austria) L Wraber	21	21
(Russia) P Kotsarenko	7	10

Third Round
3	(Singapore) Loh K Y	21	21
(Japan) D Watanabe	14	9
5	(Indonesia) C A Dwi Wardoyo	21	21
(Austria) L Wraber	14	11

Quarter-finals
3	(Singapore) Loh K Y	21	21
5	(Indonesia) C A Dwi Wardoyo	14	10

=== Bottom half ===
==== Section 3 ====
First Round
(Slovenia) M Ivanič	21	21
(Australia) D Fan	13	13
(India) S Verma	21	21
(India) H Dani	15	15
(Ukraine) A Pochtarov	21	21
(Thailand) K Laotrakul	8	15
(Uzbekistan) A Savatyugin	12	16
(Uzbekistan) A Bakhshullaev	21	21

Second Round
(Slovenia) M Ivanič	w	/	o
(India) L Sen
(India) S Verma	21	12	21
8	(Russia) S Sirant	15	21	11
(Ukraine) A Pochtarov	21	21
(England) C M Wong	13	14
(Uzbekistan) A Bakhshullaev	8	9
4	(Indonesia) I M Mustofa	21	21

Third Round
(Slovenia) M Ivanič	11	7
(India) S Verma	21	21
(Ukraine) A Pochtarov	21	13	11
4	(Indonesia) I M Mustofa	19	21	21

Quarter-finals
(India) S Verma	11	27
4	(Indonesia) I M Mustofa	21	29

==== Section 4 ====
First Round
(Russia) M Manuylov	10	7
(Vietnam) Hồ Nguyễn V Q	21	21
(Russia) A Panov	6	10
(Russia) M Makalov	21	21
(Russia) G Karpov	21	21
(England) F M Hassan	10	6

Second Round
(India) R Y Chittaboina	21	21
(Russia) A Ivanov	5	9
(Vietnam) Hồ Nguyễn V Q	16	14
6	(Spain) P Abián	21	21
(Russia) M Makalov	21	21
(Russia) A Derbenev	5	7
(Russia) G Karpov	13	12
2	(Indonesia) S H Rhustavito	21	21

Third Round
(India) R Y Chittaboina	21	12	14
6	(Spain) P Abián	16	21	21
(Russia) M Makalov	11	8
2	(Indonesia) S H Rhustavito	21	21

Quarter-finals
6	(Spain) P Abián	16	7
2	(Indonesia) S H Rhustavito	21	21

== Women's singles ==
=== Seeds ===
1. (Scotland) Kirsty Gilmour (final)
2. (Germany) Yvonne Li (first round)
3. (Vietnam) Nguyễn Thùy Linh (second round)
4. (Spain) Beatriz Corrales (withdrew)
5. (Israel) Ksenia Polikarpova (second round)
6. (Belgium) Lianne Tan (withdrew)
7. (Chinese Taipei) Pai Yu-po (champion)
8. (Canada) Brittney Tam (withdrew)

=== Finals ===
Semi-finals
1	(Scotland) Kirsty Gilmour	21	21
(United States) Iris Wang	17	8
(Switzerland) Sabrina Jaquet	21	16	17
7	(Chinese Taipei) Pai Yu-po	11	21	21

Final
1	(Scotland) Kirsty Gilmour	21	19	19
7	(Chinese Taipei) Pai Yu-po	9	21	21

=== Top half ===
==== Section 1 ====
First Round
1	(Scotland) K Gilmour	21	24
(Ukraine) M Ulitina	12	22
(Finland) A Mikkelä	21	21
Q4	(Russia) E Khmelj	11	9
5	(Israel) K Polikarpova	21	21
PFQ	(Russia) P Makkoveeva	5	6
(India) R Das	21	21
(Singapore) G Chua H Z	12	8

Second Round
1	(Scotland) K Gilmour	21	21
(Finland) A Mikkelä	10	18
5	(Israel) K Polikarpova	18	7
(India) R Das	21	21

Quarter-finals
1	(Scotland) K Gilmour	21	16	21
(India) R Das	10	21	16

==== Section 2 ====
First Round
PFQ	(Russia) V Malik	7	1
(United States) I Wang	21	21
Q1	(Russia) V Belonyuk	10	6
(Russia) N Perminova	21	21
PFQ	(Russia) E Riazantceva	w	/	o
Q3
(Russia) E Pyatina	13	14
(Hungary) L Sárosi	21	21

Second Round
(United States) I Wang	21	21
(Russia) N Perminova	12	9
PFQ	(Russia) E Riazantceva	5	7
(Hungary) L Sárosi	21	21

Quarter-finals
(United States) I Wang	21	21
(Hungary) L Sárosi	13	13

=== Bottom half ===
==== Section 3 ====
First Round
(Japan) M Hayashi	21	21
(Russia) A Semenova	9	17
PFQ	(Russia) V Kozyreva	21	21
PFQ	(Russia) I Budarina	9	6
(Russia) A Shapovalova	12	11
(Switzerland) S Jaquet	21	21
(India) R Mookerjee	11	19
3	(Vietnam) Nguyễn T L	21	21

Second Round
(Japan) M Hayashi	21	21
PFQ	(Russia) V Kozyreva	8	11
(Switzerland) S Jaquet	21	22	24
3	(Vietnam) Nguyễn T L	18	24	22

Quarter-finals
(Japan) M Hayashi	15	21	17
(Switzerland) S Jaquet	21	16	21

==== Section 4 ====
First Round
(India) V Gummadi	21	21
Q2	(Russia) A Kurguzova	8	9
(Indonesia) Choirunnisa	13	21	16
7	(Chinese Taipei) Pai Y-p	21	19	21
(Russia) V Vorobeva	5	19
(Bulgaria) M Mitsova	21	21
(Japan) N Shimoda	21	24
2	(Germany) Y Li	16	22

Second Round
(India) V Gummadi	21	9	12
7	(Chinese Taipei) Pai Y-p	19	21	21
(Bulgaria) M Mitsova	21	14	21
(Japan) N Shimoda	15	21	19

Quarter-finals
7	(Chinese Taipei) Pai Y-p	21	21
(Bulgaria) M Mitsova	11	8

== Men's doubles ==
=== Seeds ===
1. (Russia) Vladimir Ivanov / Ivan Sozonov (semi-finals)
2. (United States) Phillip Chew / Ryan Chew (second round)
3. (India) Arun George / Sanyam Shukla (second round)
4. (Japan) Keiichiro Matsui / Yoshinori Takeuchi (final)
5. (India) Dhruv Kapila / Krishna Prasad Garaga (second round)
6. (Russia) Denis Grachev / Pavel Kotsarenko (quarter-finals)
7. (Indonesia) Muhammad Shohibul Fikri / Bagas Maulana (second round)
8. (Germany) Jones Ralfy Jansen / Peter Käsbauer (quarter-finals)

=== Finals ===
Semi-finals
1	(Russia) Vladimir Ivanov (Russia) Ivan Sozonov	21	18	18
4	(Japan) Keiichiro Matsui (Japan) Yoshinori Takeuchi	17	21	21
(Denmark) Mathias Boe (Denmark) Mads Conrad-Petersen	21	18	21
(South Korea) Lee Yong-dae (South Korea) Yoo Yeon-seong	19	21	17

Final
4	(Japan) Keiichiro Matsui (Japan) Yoshinori Takeuchi	18	13
(Denmark) Mathias Boe (Denmark) Mads Conrad-Petersen	21	21

=== Top half ===
==== Section 1 ====
First Round
(Japan) K Higashino (Japan) D Watanabe	21	11	17
(Indonesia) P Kusumawardana (Indonesia) Y Rambitan	11	21	21
(Russia) D Klimenko (Russia) V Shipilenko	21	14	21
(Canada) J Lam (England) H S Wong	12	21	4

Second Round
1	(Russia) V Ivanov (Russia) I Sozonov	21	21
(Indonesia) P Kusumawardana (Indonesia) Y Rambitan	13	12
6	(Russia) D Grachev (Russia) P Kotsarenko	21	24	21
(Russia) D Klimenko (Russia) V Shipilenko	19	26	16

Quarter-finals
1	(Russia) V Ivanov (Russia) I Sozonov	w	/	o
6	(Russia) D Grachev (Russia) P Kotsarenko

==== Section 2 ====
First Round
(Russia) G Karpov (Russia) E Kurdyukov	21	21
(Russia) M Makalov (Russia) K Timofeev	10	17
(Russia) N Khakimov (Russia) A Zinchenko	21	21
(Russia) V Nikulov (Russia) A Serpionov	10	14

Second Round
4	(Japan) K Matsui (Japan) Y Takeuchi	21	21
(Russia) G Karpov (Russia) E Kurdyukov	17	14
7	(Indonesia) M S Fikri (Indonesia) B Maulana	18	15
(Russia) N Khakimov (Russia) A Zinchenko	21	21

Quarter-finals
4	(Japan) K Matsui (Japan) Y Takeuchi	21	21
(Russia) N Khakimov (Russia) A Zinchenko	17	15

=== Bottom half ===
==== Section 3 ====
First Round
(England) F M Hassan (England) C Kar Lung	22	19	21
(Russia) I Goncharov (Russia) M Manuylov	20	21	14
(Uzbekistan) A Bakhshullaev (Uzbekistan) A Savatyugin	7	13
8	(Germany) J R Jansen (Germany) P Käsbauer	21	21
(Denmark) M Boe (Denmark) M Conrad-Petersen	21	21
(Russia) Y Ismogilov (Russia) A Panov	2	3

Second Round
(England) F M Hassan (England) C Kar Lung	5	3
8	(Germany) J R Jansen (Germany) P Käsbauer	21	21
(Denmark) M Boe (Denmark) M Conrad-Petersen	w	/	o
3	(India) A George (India) S Shukla

Quarter-finals
8	(Germany) J R Jansen (Germany) P Käsbauer	15	14
(Denmark) M Boe (Denmark) M Conrad-Petersen	21	21

==== Section 4 ====
First Round	Second Round				Quarter-finals
		(South Korea) Lee Y-d (South Korea) Yoo Y-s	21	21
	5	(India) K P Garaga (India) D Kapila	14	17
					(South Korea) Lee Y-d (South Korea) Yoo Y-s	21	21
					(Japan) K Oshima (Japan) Y Tsukamoto	12	14
		(Japan) K Oshima (Japan) Y Tsukamoto	22	21
	2	(United States) P Chew (United States) R Chew	20	13

== Women's doubles ==
=== Seeds ===
1. (India) Meghana Jakkampudi / Poorvisha S. Ram (semi-finals)
2. (India) Pooja Dandu / Sanjana Santosh (withdrew)
3. (Russia) Olga Morozova / Anastasiia Akchurina (second round)
4. (Japan) Miyuki Kato / Miki Kashihara (final)
5. (Indonesia) Ni Ketut Mahadewi Istirani / Tania Oktaviani Kusumah (champions)
6. (Indonesia) Siti Fadia Silva Ramadhanti / Ribka Sugiarto (quarter-finals)
7. (Japan) Erina Honda / Nozomi Shimizu (semi-finals)
8. (Russia) Viktoriia Kozyreva / Mariia Sukhova (quarter-finals)

=== Finals ===
Semi-finals
1	(India) Meghana Jakkampudi (India) Poorvisha S. Ram	10	8
4	(Japan) Miki Kashihara (Japan) Miyuki Kato	21	21
5	(Indonesia) Ni Ketut Mahadewi Istirani (Indonesia) Tania Oktaviani Kusumah	21	15	21
7	(Japan) Erina Honda (Japan) Nozomi Shimizu	10	21	14

Final
4	(Japan) Miki Kashihara (Japan) Miyuki Kato	21	16
5	(Indonesia) Ni Ketut Mahadewi Istirani (Indonesia) Tania Oktaviani Kusumah	23	21

=== Top half ===
==== Section 1 ====
First Round	Second Round					Quarter-finals
	1	(India) M Jakkampudi (India) P S. Ram	13	21	21
		(Russia) A Kurdyukova (Russia) A Shapovalova	21	12	15
						1	(India) M Jakkampudi (India) P S. Ram	21	21
						8	(Russia) V Kozyreva (Russia) M Sukhova	19	11
	8	(Russia) V Kozyreva (Russia) M Sukhova	21	21
		(Russia) I Budarina (Russia) V Malik	12	5

==== Section 2 ====
First Round	Second Round				Quarter-finals
	4	(Japan) M Kashihara (Japan) M Kato	21	21
		(Russia) N Perminova (Russia) A Semenova	9	12
					4	(Japan) M Kashihara (Japan) M Kato	21	21
					6	(Indonesia) S F S Ramadhanti (Indonesia) R Sugiarto	17	16
	6	(Indonesia) S F S Ramadhanti (Indonesia) R Sugiarto	21	21
		(Russia) V Belonyuk (Russia) D Radchenko	5	10

=== Bottom half ===
==== Section 3 ====
First Round
(Russia) E Khmelj (Russia) P Makkoveeva	18	11
(Russia) V Slobodyanyuk (Russia) E Tarasova	21	21

Second Round
(Russia) V Slobodyanyuk (Russia) E Tarasova	13	8
5	(Indonesia) N K M Istirani (Indonesia) T O Kusumah	21	21
(Russia) N Vislova (Russia) V Vorobeva	12	21	21
3	(Russia) O Morozova (Russia) A Akchurina	21	10	15

Quarter-finals
5	(Indonesia) N K M Istirani (Indonesia) T O Kusumah	18	21	21
(Russia) N Vislova (Russia) V Vorobeva	21	9	11

==== Section 4 ====
First Round	Second Round					Quarter-finals
		(Russia) A Kurguzova (Russia) E Riazantceva	8	8
	7	(Japan) E Honda (Japan) N Shimizu	21	21
						7	(Japan) E Honda (Japan) N Shimizu	21	21
							(India) A Balan (India) P Sawant	17	11
		(India) A Balan (India) P Sawant	w	/	o
	2	(India) P Dandu (India) S Santosh

== Mixed doubles ==
=== Seeds ===
1. (Russia) Evgenij Dremin / Evgenia Dimova (final)
2. (India) Rohan Kapoor / Kuhoo Garg (second round)
3. (Singapore) Danny Bawa Chrisnanta / Tan Wei Han (semi-finals)
4. (Czech Republic) Jakub Bitman / Alžběta Bášová (quarter-finals)
5. (Indonesia) Rehan Naufal Kusharjanto / Lisa Ayu Kusumawati (quarter-finals)
6. (India) Krishna Prasad Garaga / Poorvisha S. Ram (quarter-finals)
7. (Indonesia) Adnan Maulana / Mychelle Crhystine Bandaso (champions)
8. (India) Dhruv Kapila / Meghana Jakkampudi (semi-finals)

=== Finals ===
Semi-finals
1	(Russia) Evgenij Dremin (Russia) Evgenia Dimova	21	21
3	(Singapore) Danny Bawa Chrisnanta (Singapore) Tan Wei Han	13	17
7	(Indonesia) Adnan Maulana (Indonesia) Mychelle Crhystine Bandaso	21	21
8	(India) Dhruv Kapila (India) Meghana Jakkampudi	6	15

Final
1	(Russia) Evgenij Dremin (Russia) Evgenia Dimova	21	13	15
7	(Indonesia) Adnan Maulana (Indonesia) Mychelle Crhystine Bandaso	19	21	21

=== Top half ===
==== Section 1 ====
First Round	Second Round				Quarter-finals
	1	(Russia) E Dremin (Russia) E Dimova	21	21
		(Russia) I Goncharov (Russia) A Kurguzova	7	10
					1	(Russia) E Dremin (Russia) E Dimova	21	21
					6	(India) K P Garaga (India) P S. Ram	11	14
	6	(India) K P Garaga (India) P S. Ram	21	21
		(Russia) M Manuylov (Russia) V Malik	5	14

==== Section 2 ====
First Round
(Russia) A Derbenev (Russia) E Khmelj	7	10
(Russia) P Kotsarenko (Russia) N Vislova	21	21

Second Round
3	(Singapore) D B Chrisnanta (Singapore) Tan W H	21	21
(Russia) A Ivanov (Russia) V Slobodyanyuk	9	8
5	(Indonesia) R N Kusharjanto (Indonesia) L A Kusumawati	21	21
(Russia) P Kotsarenko (Russia) N Vislova	16	18

Quarter-finals
3	(Singapore) D B Chrisnanta (Singapore) Tan W H	21	22
5	(Indonesia) R N Kusharjanto (Indonesia) L A Kusumawati	15	20

=== Bottom half ===
==== Section 3 ====
First Round
(Russia) E Kholkin (Russia) M Sukhova	16	21	21
(Russia) R Kargaev (Russia) O Morozova	21	19	15

Second Round
(Russia) E Kholkin (Russia) M Sukhova	11	7
7	(Indonesia) A Maulana (Indonesia) M C Bandaso	21	21
(Russia) A Panov (Russia) P Makkoveeva	10	14
4	(Czech Republic) J Bitman (Czech Republic) A Bášová	21	21

Quarter-finals
7	(Indonesia) A Maulana (Indonesia) M C Bandaso	w	/	o
4	(Czech Republic) J Bitman (Czech Republic) A Bášová

==== Section 4 ====
First Round	Second Round					Quarter-finals
		(Russia) V Nikulov (Russia) A Semenova	21	18	20
	8	(India) D Kapila (India) M Jakkampudi	13	21	22
						8	(India) D Kapila (India) M Jakkampudi	21	21
							(Russia) M Makalov (Russia) E Riazantceva	3	12
		(Russia) M Makalov (Russia) E Riazantceva	w	/	o
	2	(India) R Kapoor (India) K Garg

Preceded by 2019 U.S. Open	BWF World Tour; 2019 BWF season	Succeeded by 2019 Indonesia Open
