= Andrey Ashmarin =

Russian badminton player (born 1984)

Personal information
- Born: Andrey Olegovich Ashmarin (Андрей Олегович Ашмарин); 12 February 1984 (age 42) Moscow, Russian SFSR, Soviet Union

Sport
- Country: Russia
- Sport: Badminton

Men's & mixed doubles
- Highest ranking: 59 (MD 8 July 2010); 64 (XD 8 July 2010)
- BWF profile

Andrey Olegovich Ashmarin (Russian: Андрей Олегович Ашмарин; born 12 February 1984) is a Russian badminton player. He became the runner-up of 2013 Russian Open in men's doubles event with his partner Vitalij Durkin.

== Achievements ==
=== BWF Grand Prix ===
The BWF Grand Prix had two levels, the Grand Prix and Grand Prix Gold. It was a series of badminton tournaments sanctioned by the Badminton World Federation (BWF) and played between 2007 and 2017.

Men's doubles
Year	Tournament	Partner	Opponent	Score	Result
2013	Russian Open	(Russia) Vitalij Durkin	(Russia) Vladimir Ivanov (Russia) Ivan Sozonov	16–21, 19–21	(silver) Runner-up

BWF Grand Prix Gold tournament
BWF Grand Prix tournament

=== BWF International Challenge/Series ===
Men's doubles
Year	Tournament	Partner	Opponent	Score	Result
2006	Kalev International	(Russia) Anton Nazarenko	(Poland) Adam Cwalina (Poland) Rafał Hawel	21–17, 21–15	(gold) Winner
2006	Riga International	(Russia) Anton Nazarenko	(Scotland) David T. Forbes (Scotland) Stewart Kerr		(silver) Runner-up
2006	Norwegian International	(Russia) Anton Nazarenko	(Denmark) Christopher Bruun Jensen (Denmark) Morten T. Kronborg	19–21, 21–13, 21–18	(gold) Winner
2006	Bulgarian International	(Russia) Anton Nazarenko	(Denmark) Rasmus Mangor Andersen (Denmark) Peter Steffensen	12–21, 17–21	(silver) Runner-up
2009	Estonian International	(Russia) Anton Ivanov	(Japan) Naoki Kawamae (Japan) Shoji Sato	13–21, 9–21	(silver) Runner-up
2009	Kharkiv International	(Russia) Andrei Ivanov	(Ukraine) Valeriy Atrashchenkov (Ukraine) Vladislav Druzchenko	21–16, 23–21	(gold) Winner
2010	Finnish Open	(Russia) Andrei Ivanov	(France) Laurent Constantin (France) Sébastien Vincent	21–11, 17–21, 11–21	(silver) Runner-up
2013	Lithuanian International	(Russia) Anatoliy Yartsev	(Russia) Konstantin Abramov (Russia) Yaroslav Egerev	21–16, 21–8	(gold) Winner
2013	White Nights	(Russia) Sergey Shumilkin	(France) Baptiste Carême (France) Ronan Labar	17–21, 16–21	(silver) Runner-up

Mixed doubles
Year	Tournament	Partner	Opponent	Score	Result
2009	Estonian International	(Russia) Ksenia Polikarpova	(China) Zhang Yi (China) Cai Jiani	9–21, 13–21	(silver) Runner-up
2009	Kharkiv International	(Russia) Anastasia Prokopenko	(Ukraine) Valeriy Atrashchenkov (Ukraine) Elena Prus	Walkover	(silver) Runner-up
2010	Finnish Open	(Russia) Anastasia Prokopenko	(Denmark) Mikkel Delbo Larsen (Denmark) Mie Schjøtt-Kristensen	12–21, 18–21	(silver) Runner-up
2010	Polish Open	(Russia) Anastasia Prokopenko	(Singapore) Chayut Triyachart (Singapore) Lei Yao	21–12, 21–17	(gold) Winner
2012	Dutch International	(Russia) Anastasia Panushkina	(Poland) Robert Mateusiak (Poland) Nadieżda Zięba	10–21, 19–21	(silver) Runner-up
2013	Lithuanian International	(Russia) Ekaterina Bolotova	(Russia) Yaroslav Egerev (Russia) Irina Khlebko	21–15, 21–14	(gold) Winner

BWF International Challenge tournament
BWF International Series tournament
BWF Future Series tournament
