= Gaëtan Mittelheisser =

French badminton player (born 1993)

Personal information
- Born: 26 July 1993 (age 33) Saint-Louis, France
- Years active: 2011
- Height: 1.81 m (5 ft 11 in)
- Weight: 75 kg (165 lb)

Sport
- Country: France
- Sport: Badminton
- Handedness: Right

Men's & mixed doubles
- Highest ranking: 36 (MD 23 May 2013); 29 (XD 10 September 2015)
- BWF profile
Medal record
Men's badminton
Representing France
European Games
Silver medal – second place	2015 Baku	Mixed doubles
European Men's Team Championships
Silver medal – second place	2016 Kazan	Men's team
Bronze medal – third place	2018 Kazan	Men's team
Mediterranean Games
Bronze medal – third place	2013 Mersin	Men's doubles

Gaëtan Mittelheisser (born 26 July 1993) is a French badminton player. He started playing badminton at aged 5. In 2012, he won the French National Badminton Championships in the men's doubles event, and in 2013 he joined the France national badminton team. In 2013, he also won the bronze medal at the Mediterranean Games in the men's doubles event.

== Achievements ==
=== European Games ===
Mixed doubles
Year	Venue	Partner	Opponent	Score	Result
2015	Baku Sports Hall; Baku, Azerbaijan	(France) Audrey Fontaine	(Denmark) Niclas Nøhr (Denmark) Sara Thygesen	16–21, 16–21	Silver

=== Mediterranean Games ===
Men's doubles
Year	Venue	Partner	Opponent	Score	Result
2013	Mersin University Hall; Mersin, Turkey	(France) Baptiste Carême	(Slovenia) Iztok Utroša (Slovenia) Miha Horvat	21–8, 21–14	Bronze

=== BWF International Challenge/Series ===
Men's doubles
Year	Tournament	Partner	Opponent	Score	Result
2012	White Nights	(France) Baptiste Carême	(France) Ronan Labar (France) Mathias Quéré	21–19, 21–19	(gold) Winner
2012	Kharkiv International	(France) Baptiste Carême	(Sweden) Patrick Lundqvist (Sweden) Jonathan Nordh	25–23, 21–10	(gold) Winner
2013	French International	(France) Baptiste Carême	(Poland) Adam Cwalina (Poland) Przemysław Wacha	18–21, 16–21	(silver) Runner-up
2014	Romanian International	(France) Bastian Kersaudy	(Croatia) Zvonimir Đurkinjak (Croatia) Zvonimir Hölbling	12–21, 13–21	(silver) Runner-up
2014	Orléans International	(France) Bastian Kersaudy	(Poland) Adam Cwalina (Poland) Przemysław Wacha	21–13, 17–21, 18–21	(silver) Runner-up
2014	Brazil International	(France) Bastian Kersaudy	(France) Matthieu Lo Ying Ping (France) Laurent Constantin	11–9, 9–11, 11–7, 11–5	(gold) Winner

Mixed doubles
Year	Tournament	Partner	Opponent	Score	Result
2012	Kharkiv International	(France) Émilie Lefel	(Sweden) Nico Ruponen (Sweden) Amanda Högström	21–23, 21–10, 16–21	(silver) Runner-up
2014	Brazil International	(France) Audrey Fontaine	(France) Laurent Constantin (France) Laura Choinet	10–11, 11–5, 10–11, 7–11	(silver) Runner-up
2014	Italian International	(France) Audrey Fontaine	(France) Ronan Labar (France) Émilie Lefel	15–21, 14–21	(silver) Runner-up
2015	Finnish Open	(France) Audrey Fontaine	(Russia) Anatoliy Yartsev (Russia) Evgeniya Kosetskaya	16–21, 21–17, 10–21	(silver) Runner-up
2015	Kharkiv International	(France) Audrey Fontaine	(Poland) Robert Mateusiak (Poland) Nadieżda Zięba	14–21, 14–21	(silver) Runner-up
2016	Spanish International	(France) Émilie Lefel	(England) Ben Lane (England) Jessica Pugh	14–21, 15–21, 14–21	(silver) Runner-up

Commonwealth Youth Games tournament
BWF International Series tournament
BWF Future Series tournament
