= Riichi Takeshita =

Japanese badminton player (born 1989)

Personal information
- Born: 28 July 1989 (age 37) Saga Prefecture, Japan
- Height: 1.76 m (5 ft 9 in)

Sport
- Country: Japan
- Sport: Badminton
- Handedness: Right
- Retired: 28 February 2019

Men's singles & doubles
- Highest ranking: 33 (MS 12 March 2015); 123 (MD 2 December 2010)
- BWF profile
Medal record
Men's badminton
Representing Japan
Thomas Cup
Bronze medal – third place	2012 Wuhan	Men's team
Asian Games
Bronze medal – third place	2018 Jakarta-Palembang	Men's team
Asian Junior Championships
Bronze medal – third place	2007 Kuala Lumpur	Boys' singles
Bronze medal – third place	2007 Kuala Lumpur	Mixed team

Riichi Takeshita (武下利一, Takeshita Riichi; born 28 July 1989) is a former Japanese badminton player from Saga Prefecture. A right-handed men's singles specialist, he reached a career-high world ranking of No. 33 in 2015. Takeshita serves as the women's singles coach for the ACT SAIKYO badminton team.

== Career ==
=== Coaching career ===
Following his retirement from competition in February 2019, Takeshita served as an assistant coach for the Tonami Transportation team from March 2019 to March 2020. In April 2020, he was appointed as a coach at Ryukoku University. He subsequently joined the ACT SAIKYO badminton team as the women's singles coach, training players such as Tomoka Miyazaki and Manami Suizu.

== Achievements ==
=== Asian Junior Championships ===
Boys' singles
Year	Venue	Opponent	Score	Result	Ref.
2007	Stadium Juara, Kuala Lumpur, Malaysia	(Malaysia) Mohamad Arif Abdul Latif	18–21, 18–21	Bronze	

=== BWF World Tour (1 runner-up) ===
The BWF World Tour, announced on 19 March 2017 and implemented in 2018, is a series of elite badminton tournaments, sanctioned by Badminton World Federation (BWF). The BWF World Tour are divided into six levels, namely World Tour Finals, Super 1000, Super 750, Super 500, Super 300 (part of the HSBC World Tour), and the BWF Tour Super 100.

Men's singles
Year	Tournament	Level	Opponent	Score	Result	Ref.
2018	Chinese Taipei Open	Super 300	(Malaysia) Lee Zii Jia	17–21, 21–16, 11–21	(silver) Runner-up	

=== BWF Grand Prix (1 title, 2 runners-up) ===
The BWF Grand Prix has two levels: Grand Prix and Grand Prix Gold. It is a series of badminton tournaments, sanctioned by Badminton World Federation (BWF) since 2007.

Men's singles
Year	Tournament	Opponent	Score	Result	Ref.
2013	New Zealand Open	(China) Xue Song	21–16, 16–21, 21–17	(gold) Winner	
2014	Russian Open	(Russia) Vladimir Ivanov	21–16, 5–21, 21–17	(silver) Runner-up	
2016	New Zealand Open	(China) Huang Yuxiang	12–21, 17–21	(silver) Runner-up	

BWF Grand Prix Gold tournament
BWF Grand Prix tournament

=== BWF International Challenge/Series (4 titles, 3 runners-up) ===
Men's singles
Year	Tournament	Opponent	Score	Result	Ref.
2011	New Zealand International	(Hong Kong) Wong Wing Ki	21–19, 21–19	(gold) Winner	
2013	Austrian International	(Japan) Kento Momota	19–21, 12–21	(silver) Runner-up	
2014	Osaka International	(Hong Kong) Ng Ka Long	13–21, 12–21	(silver) Runner-up	
2014	Sydney International	(China) Huang Guoxing	9–11, 11–7, 11–5, 11–4	(gold) Winner	
2016	Yonex / K&D Graphics International	(Russia) Sergey Sirant	21–13, 21–18	(gold) Winner	
2017	Smiling Fish International	(Thailand) Pannawit Thongnuam	19–21, 22–24	(silver) Runner-up	
2018	Sydney International	(Malaysia) Soo Teck Zhi	21–18, 21–11	(gold) Winner	

BWF International Challenge tournament
BWF International Series tournament
