= Anna Kobceva =

Ukrainian badminton player (born 1986)

Personal information
- Born: Hanna Viacheslavivna Kobtseva; 28 October 1986 (age 40) Kharkiv, Ukrainian SSR, Soviet Union
- Height: 1.61 m (5 ft 3 in)

Sport
- Country: Ukraine
- Sport: Badminton
- Handedness: Right
- Coached by: Gennadiy Makhnovskiy

Women's & mixed doubles
- Highest ranking: 33 (WD with Elena Prus 23 September 2010); 33 (XD with Valeriy Atrashchenkov 27 September 2012)
- BWF profile

Anna Vyacheslavivna Kobceva (Ukrainian: Ганна В'ячеславівна Кобцева, romanized: Hanna Viacheslavivna Kobtseva; born 28 October 1986) is a Ukrainian badminton player.

== Achievements ==
=== BWF International Challenge/Series ===
Women's doubles
Year	Tournament	Partner	Opponent	Score	Result
2008	Kharkiv International	(Russia) Maria Nikolaenko	(Ukraine) Alexsandra Bardakova (Ukraine) Viktoria Pogrebniak	21–19, 21–16	(gold) Winner
2009	Kharkiv International	(Ukraine) Elena Prus	(Russia) Tatjana Bibik (Russia) Olga Golovanova	8–21, 21–18, 21–18	(gold) Winner
2010	Kharkiv International	(Ukraine) Elena Prus	(Ukraine) Marija Ulitina (Ukraine) Natalya Voytsekh	21–23, 12–21	(silver) Runner-up
2011	Lithuanian International	(Ukraine) Elena Prus	(Ukraine) Marija Ulitina (Ukraine) Natalya Voytsekh	21–12, 21–19	(gold) Winner

Mixed doubles
Year	Tournament	Partner	Opponent	Score	Result
2011	Bulgarian International	(Ukraine) Valeriy Atrashchenkov	(England) Gary Fox (England) Samantha Ward	21–18, 19–21, 21–14	(gold) Winner
2013	Finnish Open	(Ukraine) Valeriy Atrashchenkov	(Denmark) Anders Skaarup Rasmussen (Denmark) Lena Grebak	21–13, 15–21, 11–21	(silver) Runner-up

BWF International Challenge tournament
BWF International Series tournament
BWF Future Series tournament
