= Tatjana Bibik =

Russian badminton player (born 1985)

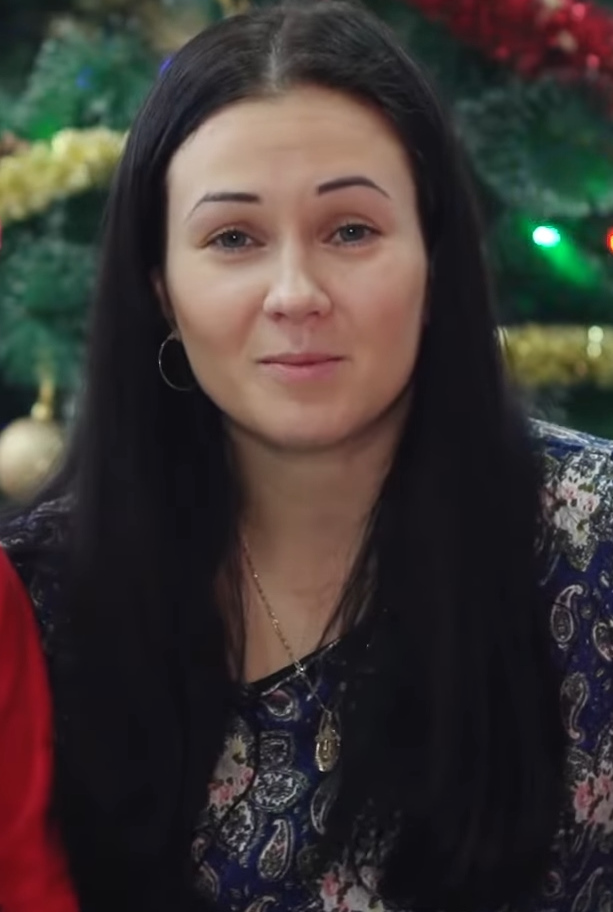

Personal information
- Born: Tatjana Viktorovna Bibik (Татьяна Викторовна Бибик); 16 April 1985 (age 41)

Sport
- Country: Russia
- Sport: Badminton

Women's singles & doubles
- Highest ranking: 41 (WS, 2 December 2010); 28 (WD, 16 May 2013); 153 (XD, 28 April 2016)
- BWF profile
Medal record
Women's badminton
Representing Russia
European Mixed Team Championships
Bronze medal – third place	2009 Liverpool	Mixed team
Bronze medal – third place	2011 Amsterdam	Mixed team
Bronze medal – third place	2013 Moscow	Mixed team
European Women's Team Championships
Silver medal – second place	2010 Warsaw	Women's team
European Junior Championships
Bronze medal – third place	2001 Spała	Mixed team

Tatjana Viktorovna Bibik (Russian: Татьяна Викторовна Бибик; born 16 April 1985) is a Russian badminton player. She won bronze medals at the European Mixed Team Championships in 2009, 2011 and 2013; also the silver medal at the 2010 European Women's Team Championships with the Russian national team.

== Achievements ==
=== BWF Grand Prix ===
The BWF Grand Prix had two levels, the Grand Prix and Grand Prix Gold. It was a series of badminton tournaments sanctioned by the Badminton World Federation (BWF) and played between 2007 and 2017.

Women's singles
Year	Tournament	Opponent	Score	Result
2009	Russian Open	(Russia) Ella Diehl	17–21, 21–16, 11–21	(silver) Runner-up

Women's doubles
Year	Tournament	Partner	Opponent	Score	Result
2009	Russian Open	(Russia) Olga Golovanova	(Russia) Valeria Sorokina (Russia) Nina Vislova	8–21, 20–22	(silver) Runner-up

Mixed doubles
Year	Tournament	Partner	Opponent	Score	Result
2013	Russian Open	(Russia) Ivan Sozonov	(Russia) Vitalij Durkin (Russia) Nina Vislova	21–17, 24–22	(gold) Winner

BWF Grand Prix Gold tournament
BWF Grand Prix tournament

=== BWF International Challenge/Series ===
Women's singles
Year	Tournament	Opponent	Score	Result
2004	Russian International	(Russia) Ella Karachkova	5–11, 6–11	(silver) Runner-up
2007	Polish Open	(Japan) Chie Umezu	12–21, 7–21	(silver) Runner-up
2009	Croatian International	(Malaysia) Anita Raj Kaur	21–19, 12–21, 12–21	(silver) Runner-up
2009	Estonian International	(Denmark) Anne Hald Jensen	21–11, 21–10	(gold) Winner
2009	Hungarian International	(Switzerland) Jeanine Cicognini	20–22, 12–21	(silver) Runner-up
2009	Kharkiv International	(Denmark) Anne Hald Jensen	17–21, 13–21	(silver) Runner-up
2009	Welsh International	(Malaysia) Anita Raj Kaur	21–19, 15–21, 21–18	(gold) Winner
2010	White Nights	(Russia) Anastasia Prokopenko	11–21, 21–8, 21–17	(gold) Winner
2010	Scottish Open	(England) Elizabeth Cann	25–23, 21–12	(gold) Winner

Women's doubles
Year	Tournament	Partner	Opponent	Score	Result
2007	Slovak International	(Russia) Elena Shimko	(Russia) Elena Chernyavskya (Russia) Anastasia Prokopenko	Walkover	(gold) Winner
2008	Croatian International	(Russia) Olga Golovanova	(Denmark) Maria Thorberg (Estonia) Kati Tolmoff	22–24, 15–21	(silver) Runner-up
2009	Kharkiv International	(Russia) Olga Golovanova	(Ukraine) Anna Kobceva (Ukraine) Elena Prus	21–8, 18–21, 18–21	(silver) Runner-up
2009	Hungarian International	(Russia) Olga Golovanova	(Russia) Irina Khlebko (Russia) Ksenia Polikarpova	21–16, 17–21, 21–13	(gold) Winner
2010	Bulgarian International	(Russia) Olga Golovanova	(Bulgaria) Petya Nedelcheva (Russia) Anastasia Russkikh	Walkover	(silver) Runner-up
2011	White Nights	(Russia) Olga Golovanova	(Russia) Irina Khlebko (Russia) Anastasia Russkikh	17–21, 19–21	(silver) Runner-up
2011	Cyprus International	(Russia) Anastasia Chervyakova	(Denmark) Celine Juel (Denmark) Josephine van Zaane	21–12, 21–11	(gold) Winner
2012	Spanish Open	(Russia) Anastasia Chervyakova	(England) Mariana Agathangelou (England) Alexandra Langley	12–21, 21–16, 21–18	(gold) Winner
2012	White Nights	(Russia) Anastasia Chervyakova	(Russia) Evgeniya Kosetskaya (Russia) Viktoriia Vorobeva	Walkover	(gold) Winner
2015	Kazakhstan International	(Russia) Ksenia Polikarpova	(Iran) Sorayya Aghaei (Iran) Negin Amiripour	21–14, 21–12	(gold) Winner

Mixed doubles
Year	Tournament	Partner	Opponent	Score	Result
2004	Russian International	(Russia) Vitalij Durkin	(Russia) Aleksandr Nikolaenko (Russia) Valeria Sorokina	7–15, 13–15	(silver) Runner-up
2015	Hellas International	(Russia) Ilya Zhdanov	(Poland) Paweł Pietryja (Poland) Aneta Wojtkowska	21–10, 28–26	(gold) Winner

BWF International Challenge tournament
BWF International Series tournament
BWF Future Series tournament
