= Dmytro Zavadskyi =

Ukrainian badminton player

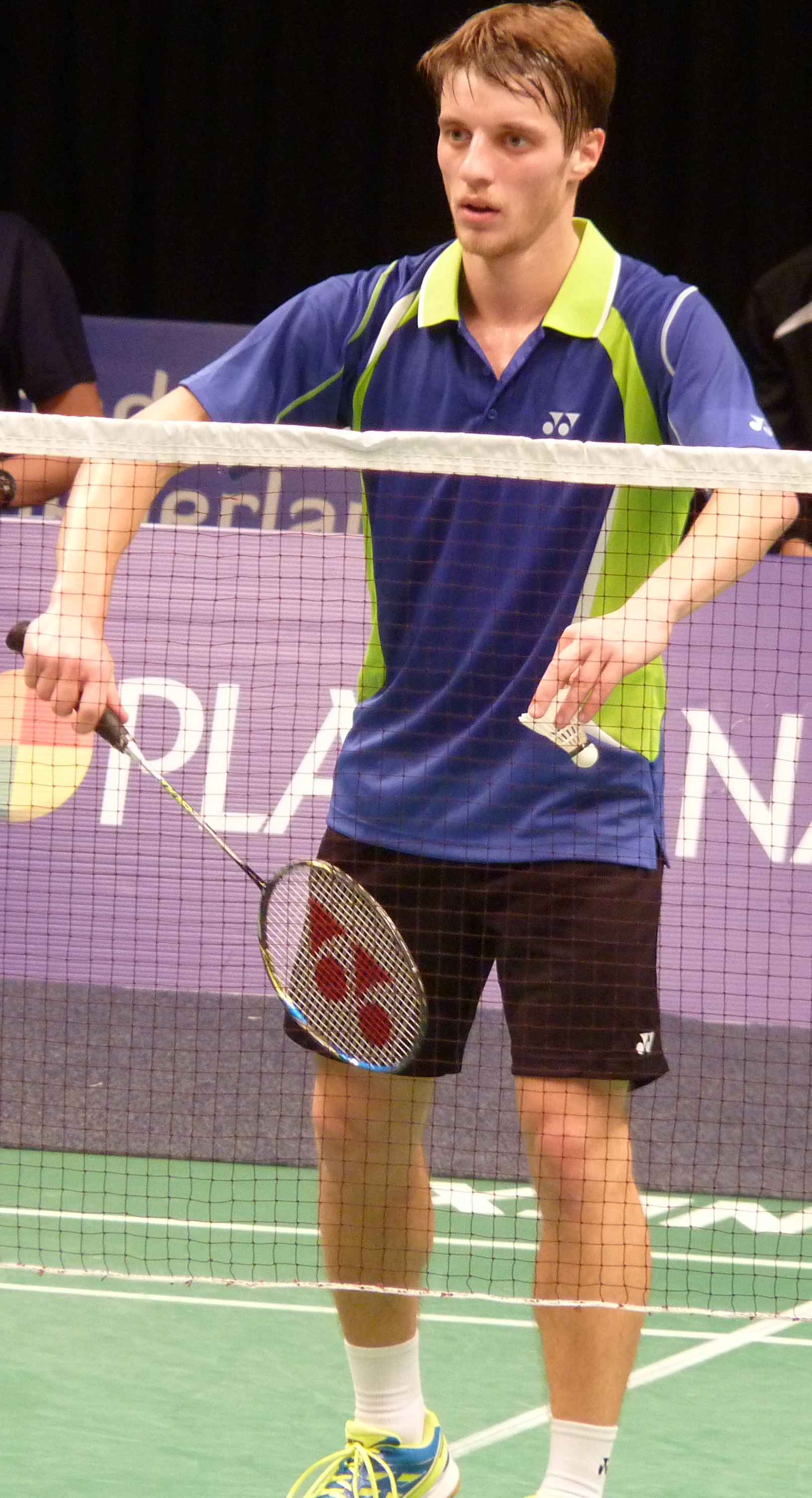

Personal information
- Born: Дмитро Олександрович Завадський; 4 November 1988 (age 37) Kharkiv, Ukrainian SSR, Soviet Union
- Height: 1.74 m (5 ft 9 in)
- Weight: 70 kg (154 lb)

Sport
- Country: Ukraine
- Sport: Badminton
- Handedness: Right
- Coached by: Mykhaylo Sterin; Andriy Diptan

Men's singles & doubles
- Highest ranking: 40 (MS 19 June 2014); 47 (MD 2 December 2010); 52 (XD 8 October 2009)
- BWF profile

Dmytro Oleksandrovych Zavadskyi (Ukrainian: Дмитро Олександрович Завадський; born 4 November 1988) is a Ukrainian badminton player. He competed for Ukraine at the 2012 Summer Olympics.

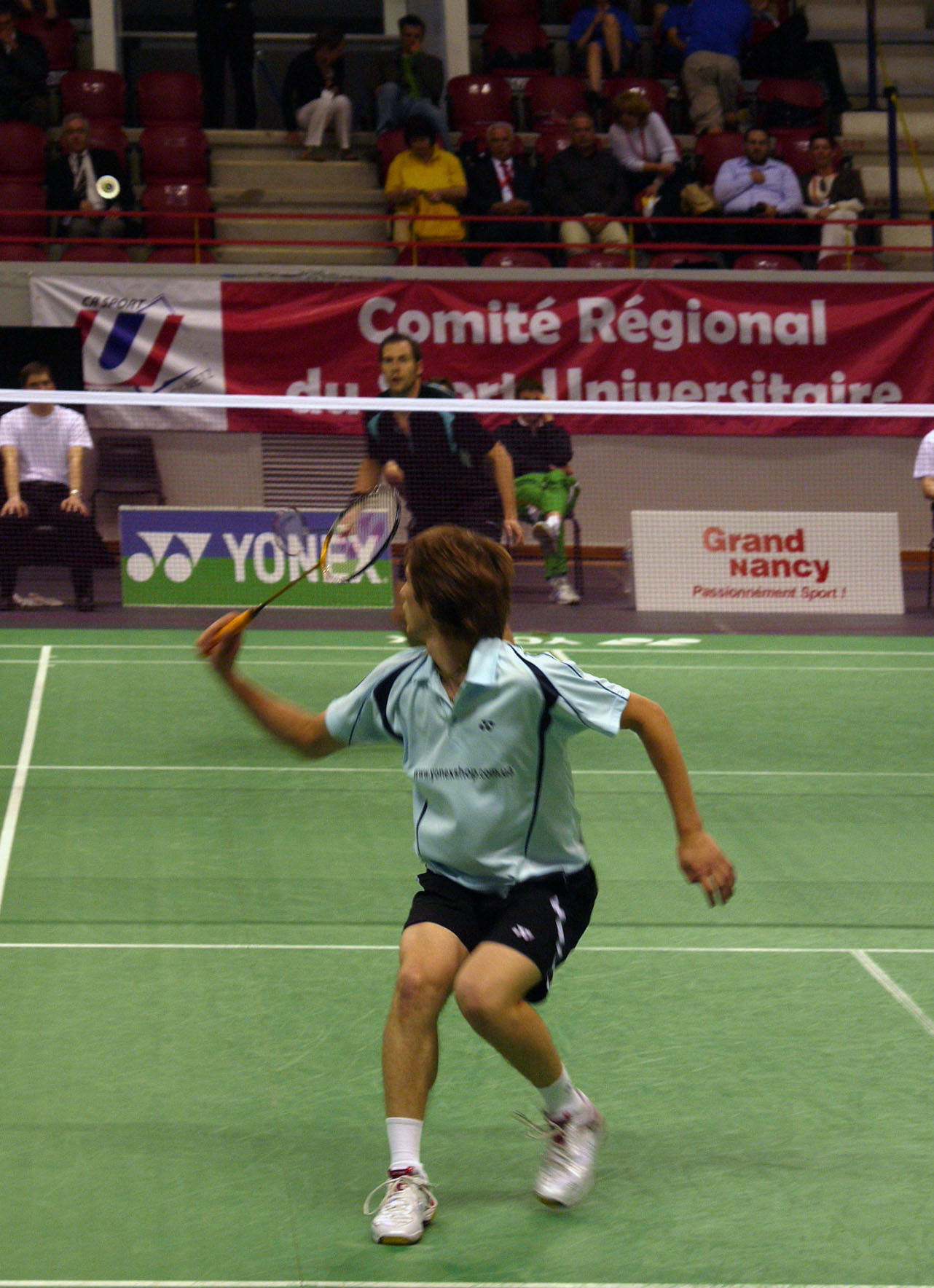

== Achievements ==
=== BWF International Challenge/Series ===
Men's singles

Year	Tournament	Opponent	Score	Result
2015	Slovenia International	(Finland) Kalle Koljonen	12–21, 21–19, 22–20	(gold) Winner
2015	Orleans International	(Indonesia) Andre Kurniawan Tedjono	24–22, 21–17	(gold) Winner
2013	Kharkiv International	(Sweden) Mathias Borg	21–14, 21–17	(gold) Winner
2013	Finnish Open	(England) Rajiv Ouseph	16–21, 12–21	(silver) Runner-up
2012	Turkey International	(Poland) Adrian Dziolko	21–19, 21–19	(gold) Winner
2012	White Nights	(Poland) Przemyslaw Wacha	16–21, 21–15, 21–18	(gold) Winner
2012	Polish Open	(Chinese Taipei) Hsu Jen-hao	17–21, 10–21	(silver) Runner-up
2011	Kharkiv International	(France) Brice Leverdez	21–9, 14–21, 14–21	(silver) Runner-up
2011	Austrian International	(Chinese Taipei) Hsu Jen-hao	15–21, 12–21	(silver) Runner-up
2009	Czech International	(Czech Republic) Petr Koukal	17–21, 19–21	(silver) Runner-up
2009	Kharkiv International	(Denmark) Kristian Midtgaard	17–21, 21–8, 21–13	(gold) Winner
2009	White Nights	(Russia) Stanislav Pukhov	21–0, 21–0 Disqualified	(gold) Winner
2008	Kharkiv International	(Russia) Vladimir Malkov	21–14, 21–16	(gold) Winner

Men's doubles

Year	Tournament	Partner	Opponent	Score	Result
2014	Kharkiv International	(Ukraine) Vitaly Konov	(Ukraine) Gennadiy Natarov (Ukraine) Artem Pochtarev	6–11, 8–11, 9–11	(silver) Runner-up
2008	Kharkiv International	(Ukraine) Vitaly Konov	(Russia) Gordey Kosenko (Russia) Vladimir Malkov	Walkover	(gold) Winner

Mixed doubles

Year	Tournament	Partner	Opponent	Score	Result
2008	Slovak Open	(Ukraine) Mariya Diptan	(Ukraine) Valeriy Atrashchenkov (Ukraine) Elena Prus	19–21, 14–21	(silver) Runner-up
2008	Kharkiv International	(Ukraine) Mariya Diptan	(Ukraine) Dmitry Miznikov (Ukraine) Elena Prus	21–19, 21–15	(gold) Winner

BWF International Challenge tournament
BWF International Series tournament
BWF Future Series tournament
