= Gordey Kosenko =

Russian badminton player (born 1989)

Gordey Kosenko Гордей Косенко
Personal information
- Born: Gordey Alekseevich Kosenko (Гордей Алексеевич Косенко); 3 January 1989 (age 37)

Sport
- Country: Russia
- Sport: Badminton

Men's singles & doubles
- Highest ranking: 208 (MS 21 January 2010); 164 (MD 29 April 2010); 192 (XD 17 September 2015)
- BWF profile

Gordey Alekseevich Kosenko (Russian: Гордей Алексеевич Косенко; born 3 January 1989) is a Russian badminton player.

== Achievements ==
=== BWF International Challenge/Series (3 runners-up) ===
Men's doubles

Year	Tournament	Partner	Opponent	Score	Result
2008	Kharkiv International	(Russia) Vladimir Malkov	(Ukraine) Vitaly Konov (Ukraine) Dmytro Zavadsky	Walkover	(silver) Runner-up
2013	Turkey International	(Russia) Aleksandr Nikolaenko	(Russia) Nikita Khakimov (Russia) Vaslily Kuznetsov	20–22, 19–21	(silver) Runner-up
2015	Kazakhstan International	(Russia) Vadim Novoselov	(Malaysia) Lim Ming Chuen (Malaysia) Ong Wei Khoon	18–21, 21–18, 18–21	(silver) Runner-up

BWF International Challenge tournament
BWF International Series tournament
BWF Future Series tournament
