= Irina Khlebko =

Russian badminton player (born 1990)

Personal information
- Born: Irina Konstantinovna Khlebko (Ирина Константиновна Хлебко); 30 November 1990 (age 35)

Sport
- Country: Russia
- Sport: Badminton

Women's singles & doubles
- Highest ranking: 216 (WS 3 March 2011); 38 (WD 9 January 2014); 163 (XD 18 June 2015)
- BWF profile
Medal record
Women's badminton
Representing Russia
European Women's Team Championships
Silver medal – second place	2014 Basel	Women's team

Irina Konstantinovna Khlebko (Russian: Ирина Константиновна Хлебко; born 30 November 1990) is a Russian badminton player.

== Achievements ==
=== BWF Grand Prix ===
The BWF Grand Prix had two levels, the Grand Prix and Grand Prix Gold. It was a series of badminton tournaments sanctioned by the Badminton World Federation (BWF) and played between 2007 and 2017.

Women's doubles
Year	Tournament	Partner	Opponent	Score	Result
2013	Russian Open	(Russia) Ksenia Polikarpova	(Russia) Anastasia Chervyakova (Russia) Nina Vislova	16–21, 18–21	(silver) Runner-up

BWF Grand Prix Gold tournament
BWF Grand Prix tournament

=== BWF International Challenge/Series ===
Women's doubles
Year	Tournament	Partner	Opponent	Score	Result
2008	Norwegian International	(Russia) Anastasia Russkikh	(Sweden) Emelie Lennartsson (Sweden) Emma Wengberg	21–18, 21–23, 21–16	(gold) Winner
2009	Estonian International	(Russia) Ksenia Polikarpova	(China) Cai Jiani (China) Bo Rong	13–21, 15–21	(silver) Runner-up
2009	Hungarian International	(Russia) Ksenia Polikarpova	(Russia) Tatjana Bibik (Russia) Olga Golovanova	16–21, 21–17, 13–21	(silver) Runner-up
2011	White Nights	(Russia) Anastasia Russkikh	(Russia) Tatjana Bibik (Russia) Olga Golovanova	21–17, 21–19	(gold) Winner
2013	Estonian International	(Russia) Ksenia Polikarpova	(Denmark) Julie Finne-Ipsen (Denmark) Rikke Søby Hansen	15–21, 21–19, 22–20	(gold) Winner
2013	Romanian International	(Russia) Ksenia Polikarpova	(Ukraine) Natalya Voytsekh (Ukraine) Yelyzaveta Zharka	21–18, 23–21	(gold) Winner
2013	Croatian International	(Russia) Ksenia Polikarpova	(Denmark) Julie Finne-Ipsen (Denmark) Rikke Søby Hansen	21–19, 21–19	(gold) Winner
2013	Lithuanian International	(Russia) Ksenia Polikarpova	(Netherlands) Alida Chen (Netherlands) Gayle Mahulette	21–10, 21–13	(gold) Winner
2014	Czech International	(Russia) Elena Komendrovskaja	(Canada) Rachel Honderich (Canada) Michelle Li	12–21, 17–21	(silver) Runner-up
2014	Finnish International	(Russia) Elena Komendrovskaja	(Russia) Victoria Dergunova (Russia) Olga Morozova	11–21, 15–21	(silver) Runner-up

Mixed doubles
Year	Tournament	Partner	Opponent	Score	Result
2013	Lithuanian International	(Russia) Yaroslav Egerev	(Russia) Andrey Ashmarin (Russia) Ekaterina Bolotova	15–21, 14–21	(silver) Runner-up

BWF International Challenge tournament
BWF International Series tournament
BWF Future Series tournament
