= Vadim Novoselov =

Russian badminton player (born 1987)

Vadim Novoselov Вадим Новоселов
Personal information
- Born: Vadim Olegovych Novoselov (Вадим Олегович Новоселов); 16 April 1987 (age 39)

Sport
- Country: Russia
- Sport: Badminton

Men's singles & doubles
- Highest ranking: 256 (MS, 31 October 2013); 127 (MD, 31 October 2013); 184 (XD, 8 July 2016)
- BWF profile

Vadim Olegovych Novoselov (Russian: Вадим Олегович Новоселов; born 16 April 1987) is a Russian badminton player. He educated at Saratov State University. In 2013, he represented his university became a champion at the European Universities Badminton Championships in the men's doubles. In the same year, he won Israel International tournament with his partner Vladimir Malkov.

== Achievements ==
=== BWF International Challenge/Series (1 title, 1 runner-up) ===
Men's doubles

Year	Tournament	Partner	Opponent	Score	Result
2013	Hatzor International	(Russia) Vladimir Malkov	(Wales) Joe Morgan (Wales) Nic Strange	21–18, 19–21, 27–25	(gold) Winner
2015	Kazakhstan International	(Russia) Gordey Kosenko	(Malaysia) Lim Ming Chuen (Malaysia) Ong Wei Khoon	18–21, 21–18, 18–21	(silver) Runner-up

BWF International Challenge tournament
BWF International Series tournament
BWF Future Series tournament
