= Artem Karpov =

Russian badminton player (born 1986)

Personal information
- Born: Artem Karpov; Артем Карпов; 23 September 1986 (age 40)

Sport
- Country: Russia
- Sport: Badminton

Men's singles & doubles
- Highest ranking: 237 (MS, 4 April 2013); 287 (MD, 5 April 2012)
- BWF profile

Artem Karpov (Russian: Артем Карпов; born 23 September 1986) is a Russian badminton player.

== Achievements ==
=== BWF International Challenge/Series ===
Men's doubles
Year	Tournament	Partner	Opponent	Score	Result
2014	Lithuanian International	(Russia) Denis Grachev	(Russia) Stanislav Pukhov (Russia) Sergey Sirant	Walkover	(gold) Winner

BWF International Challenge tournament
BWF International Series tournament
BWF Future Series tournament
