= Rohan Kapoor (badminton) =

Indian badminton player (born 1997)

Personal information
- Born: 16 September 1997 (age 29)

Sport
- Country: India
- Sport: Badminton

Men's & mixed doubles
- Highest ranking: 82 (MD with Saurabh Sharma, 15 November 2018); 29 (XD with Ruthvika Gadde, 3 June 2025)
- Current ranking: 40 (XD with Ruthvika Gadde, 3 November 2026)
- BWF profile
Medal record
Men's badminton
Representing India
Asian Games
Silver medal – second place	2022 Hangzhou	Men's team

Rohan Kapoor (born 16 September 1997) is an Indian badminton player.

== Achievements ==
=== BWF World Tour (1 runner-up) ===
The BWF World Tour, which was announced on 19 March 2017 and implemented in 2018, is a series of elite badminton tournaments sanctioned by the Badminton World Federation (BWF). The BWF World Tours are divided into levels of World Tour Finals, Super 1000, Super 750, Super 500, Super 300 (part of the HSBC World Tour), and the BWF Tour Super 100.

Mixed doubles
Year	Tournament	Level	Partner	Opponent	Score	Result
2018	Russian Open	Super 100	(India) Kuhoo Garg	(Russia) Vladimir Ivanov (South Korea) Kim Min-kyung	19–21, 17–21	(silver) Runner-up

=== BWF International Challenge/Series (10 titles, 7 runners-up) ===
Men's doubles
Year	Tournament	Partner	Opponent	Score	Result
2016	Bahrain International	(India) Vighnesh Devlekar	(Russia) Evgenij Dremin (Russia) Denis Grachev	18–21, 17–21	(silver) Runner-up
2017	Kharkiv International	(India) K. Nandagopal	(India) Alwin Francis (India) Tarun Kona	18–21, 24–22, 21–18	(gold) Winner
2019	Nepal International	(India) Saurabh Sharma	(Malaysia) Izzat Farhan Azhar (Malaysia) Zachary Chiong Shen Sia	21–10, 21–12	(gold) Winner
2019	Bahrain International	(India) Saurabh Sharma	(Thailand) Prad Tangsrirapeephan (Thailand) Apichasit Teerawiwat	21–19, 16–21, 22–24	(silver) Runner-up
2022	Maldives International	(India) B. Sumeeth Reddy	(Thailand) Chaloempon Charoenkitamorn (Thailand) Nanthakarn Yordphaisong	21–23, 21–19, 21–17	(gold) Winner

Mixed doubles
Year	Tournament	Partner	Opponent	Score	Result
2017	Hellas Open	(India) Kuhoo Garg	(India) Utkarsh Arora (India) Karishma Wadkar	21–19, 21–19	(gold) Winner
2017	India International Series	(India) Kuhoo Garg	(Malaysia) Chen Tang Jie (Malaysia) Goh Liu Ying	19–21, 13–21	(silver) Runner-up
2018	Iceland International	(India) Kuhoo Garg	(Denmark) Kristoffer Knudsen (Denmark) Isabella Nielsen	16–21, 21–19, 21–18	(gold) Winner
2018	Lagos International	(India) Kuhoo Garg	(India) Manu Attri (India) K. Maneesha	17–21, 21–23	(silver) Runner-up
2022 (II)	India International	(India) N. Sikki Reddy	(Thailand) Ratchapol Makkasasithorn (Thailand) Chasinee Korepap	22–20, 23–21	(gold) Winner
2022 (III)	India International	(India) N. Sikki Reddy	(India) Sai Pratheek K. (India) Ashwini Ponnappa	16–21, 21–11, 18–21	(silver) Runner-up
2022	Maldives International	(India) N. Sikki Reddy	(Algeria) Koceila Mammeri (Algeria) Tanina Mammeri	21–16, 21–18	(gold) Winner
2023	Slovenia Open	(India) N. Sikki Reddy	(Denmark) Jesper Toft (Denmark) Clara Graversen	12–21, 13–21	(silver) Runner-up
2023	Denmark Masters	(India) N. Sikki Reddy	(Denmark) Mads Vestergaard (Denmark) Christine Busch	21–16, 21–17	(gold) Winner
2024	Turkey International	(India) Ruthvika Gadde	(France) Julien Maio (France) Léa Palermo	15–21, 13–21	(silver) Runner-up
2024 (I)	India International	(India) Ruthvika Gadde	(India) Hariharan Amsakarunan (India) Tanisha Crasto	21–17, 21–19	(gold) Winner
2024 (II)	India International	(India) Ruthvika Gadde	(India) Ashith Surya (India) Amrutha Pramuthesh	21–16, 19–21, 21–12	(gold) Winner

BWF International Challenge tournament
BWF International Series tournament
BWF Future Series tournament
