= Stanislav Pukhov =

Russian badminton player (born 1977)

Personal information
- Born: Stanislav Yevgenyevich Pukhov (Станислав Евгеньевич Пухов); 28 June 1977 (age 49) Moscow, Russian SFSR, Soviet Union
- Height: 1.80 m (5 ft 11 in)
- Weight: 80 kg (176 lb)

Sport
- Country: Russia
- Sport: Badminton

Men's singles
- Highest ranking: 48 (21 April 2011)
- BWF profile

Stanislav Yevgenyevich Pukhov (Russian: Станислав Евгеньевич Пухов; born 28 June 1977) is a Russian badminton player. He is a five-time national champion in the men's singles (1998, 2001, 2003, 2005, and 2007), and also, defeated Arif Rasidi for the championship title and a consolation prize of $10,000 in the same division at the 2005 French International in Paris.

Pukhov qualified for the men's singles at the 2008 Summer Olympics in Beijing, after he was ranked sixtieth in the world by the Badminton World Federation. He received a bye for the second preliminary round before losing out to Lithuania's Kęstutis Navickas, with a score of 12–21 and 17–21.

== Achievements ==
=== BWF Grand Prix (1 title, 2 runners-up) ===
The BWF Grand Prix had two levels, the Grand Prix and Grand Prix Gold. It was a series of badminton tournaments sanctioned by the Badminton World Federation (BWF) and played between 2007 and 2017. The World Badminton Grand Prix was sanctioned by the International Badminton Federation from 1983 to 2006.

Men's singles
Year	Tournament	Opponent	Score	Result
2005	Russian Open	(Russia) Vladimir Malkov	3–15, 15–6, 15–8	(gold) Winner
2008	Russian Open	(Netherlands) Dicky Palyama	12–21, 18–21	(silver) Runner-up
2010	Russian Open	(Japan) Takuma Ueda	17–21, 17–21	(silver) Runner-up

BWF Grand Prix Gold tournament
BWF Grand Prix tournament

=== BWF International Challenge/Series (13 titles, 7 runners-up) ===
Men's singles
Year	Tournament	Opponent	Score	Result
1997	Bulgarian International	(Netherlands) Joris van Soerland	9–10, 9–0, 9–6, 7–9, 9–7	(gold) Winner
2002	Bulgarian International	(Finland) Kasperi Salo	15–3, 15–12	(gold) Winner
2002	Slovak International	(Poland) Jacek Niedźwiedzki	15–5, 11–15, 15–7	(gold) Winner
2002	Hungarian International	(England) Aamir Ghaffar	15–13, 4–15, 15–6	(gold) Winner
2004	Portugal International	(Poland) Przemysław Wacha	11–15, 15–3, 15–9	(gold) Winner
2004	Russian International	(Russia) Evgenij Dremin	15–5, 17–16	(gold) Winner
2005	French International	(France) Arif Rasidi	15–12, 15–3	(gold) Winner
2007	White Nights	(Canada) Bobby Milroy	24–22, 11–21, 21–19	(gold) Winner
2008	Italian International	(Malaysia) Wong Choong Hann	16–21, 15–21	(silver) Runner-up
2009	White Nights	(Ukraine) Dmytro Zavadskyi	0–21, 0–21 disq.	(silver) Runner-up
2010	Lao International	(Indonesia) Tommy Sugiarto	19–21, 13–21	(silver) Runner-up

Men's doubles

Year	Tournament	Partner	Opponent	Score	Result
2001	Slovenian International	(Russia) Nikolai Zuyev	(Belgium) Wouter Claes (Belgium) Frédéric Mawet	7–2, 1–7, 7–5, 7–3	(gold) Winner
2002	Bulgarian International	(Russia) Nikolai Zuyev	(Russia) Evgenij Isakov (Russia) Andrej Zholobov	15–5, 15–9	(gold) Winner
2002	Slovak International	(Russia) |Nikolai Zuyev	(Poland) Michał Łogosz (Poland) Robert Mateusiak	15–10, 8–15, 15–12	(gold) Winner
2002	Hungarian International	(Russia) Nikolai Zuyev	(Russia) Evgenij Isakov (Russia) Andrej Zholobov	15–17, 15–3, 15–5	(gold) Winner
2002	Welsh International	(Russia) Nikolai Zuyev	(England) Peter Jeffrey (England) Julian Robertson	15–3, 15–11	(gold) Winner
2003	French International	(Russia) Nikolai Zuyev	(Denmark) Joachim Fischer Nielsen (Denmark) Carsten Mogensen	13–15, 9–15	(silver) Runner-up
2003	Austrian International	(Russia) Nikolai Zuyev	(Poland) Michał Łogosz (Poland) Robert Mateusiak	6–15, 17–16, 11–15	(silver) Runner-up
2003	Spanish International	(Russia) Nikolai Zuyev	(Denmark) Michael Lamp (Denmark) Mathias Boe	4–15, 9–15	(silver) Runner-up
2014	Lithuanian International	(Russia) Sergey Sirant	(Russia) Denis Grachev (Russia) Artem Karpov	Walkover	(silver) Runner-up

BWF International Challenge tournament
BWF International Series tournament
BWF Future Series tournament
