= Anton Ivanov (badminton) =

Russian badminton player (born 1987)

Personal information
- Born: Anton Aleksandrovich Ivanov (Антон Александрович Иванов); 19 November 1987 (age 38) Moscow, Russian SFSR, Soviet Union

Sport
- Country: Russia
- Sport: Badminton

Men's singles & doubles
- Highest ranking: 121 (MS, 19 June 2014); 124 (MD, 21 January 2010)
- BWF profile

Anton Aleksandrovich Ivanov (Russian: Антон Александрович Иванов; born 19 November 1987) is a Russian badminton player. Partnered with Ivan Sozonov in the men's doubles event, they reach the semi-finals at the 2006 Latvia Riga International, and the runner-up at the 2007 Slovak International. He also the semi-finalist at the 2008 Bulgarian International, and the runner-up at the 2009 Estonian International with Andrey Ashmarin. He also competed in the men's singles event, and his best result in the international tournament was the semi-finalist at the 2012 Polish Open and 2013 White Nights. In 2014, he represented Russian team competed at the Thomas Cup. Ivanov was the runner-up at the 2014 national championships, and in 2015, he won the national men's singles title at the Russian Cup tournament.

Ivanov educated economy at the Moscow State Forest University, and in 2015, he competed at the Summer Universiade in Gwangju, South Korea.

== Achievements ==
=== BWF International Challenge/Series ===
Men's doubles
| Year | Tournament | Partner | Opponent | Score | Result |
|---|---|---|---|---|---|
| 2007 | Slovak International | (Russia) Ivan Sozonov | (Czech Republic) Jakub Bitman (Croatia) Zvonimir Đurkinjak | Walkover | (silver) Runner-up |
| 2009 | Estonian International | (Russia) Andrey Ashmarin | (Japan) Naoki Kawamae (Japan) Shoji Sato | 13–21, 9–21 | (silver) Runner-up |

BWF International Challenge tournament
BWF International Series tournament
BWF Future Series tournament
