= White Nights (badminton) =

Russian badminton championships

The White Nights (also known as St. Petersburg White Nights, Russian: Белые ночи) is an open international badminton tournament in Russia. This tournament is a BWF International Challenge level and part of Badminton Europe circuit.

== Previous winners ==
Year	Men's singles	Women's singles	Men's doubles	Women's doubles	Mixed doubles	Ref
2007	(Russia) Stanislav Pukhov	(Japan) Kanako Yonekura	(Russia) Vitalij Durkin (Russia) Aleksandr Nikolaenko	(Russia) Ekaterina Ananina (Russia) Anastasia Russkikh	(Russia) Aleksandr Nikolaenko (Russia) Nina Vislova	
2008	(Finland) Ville Lång	(Germany) Xu Huaiwen	(Poland) Michał Łogosz (Poland) Robert Mateusiak	(Russia) Ekaterina Ananina (Russia) Anastasia Russkikh	(Russia) Vitalij Durkin (Russia) Nina Vislova	
2009	(Ukraine) Dmytro Zavadsky	(Russia) Ella Diehl	(Russia) Vitalij Durkin (Russia) Aleksandr Nikolaenko	(Russia) Valeria Sorokina (Russia) Nina Vislova	(Indonesia) Flandy Limpele (Russia) Anastasia Russkikh	
2010	(Russia) Ivan Sozonov	(Russia) Tatjana Bibik	(Poland) Adam Cwalina (Poland) Michał Łogosz	(Russia) Valeria Sorokina (Russia) Nina Vislova	(Russia) Evgeny Dremin (Russia) Anastasia Russkikh	
2011	(Chinese Taipei) Hsu Jen-hao	(Indonesia) Fransisca Ratnasari	(Indonesia) Rian Sukmawan (Indonesia) Rendra Wijaya	(Russia) Irina Khlebko (Russia) Anastasia Russkikh	(Singapore) Danny Bawa Chrisnanta (Singapore) Vanessa Neo	
2012	(Ukraine) Dmytro Zavadsky	(Poland) Kamila Augustyn	(France) Baptiste Carême (France) Gaëtan Mittelheisser	(Russia) Tatjana Bibik (Russia) Anastasia Chervyakova	(France) Baptiste Carême (France) Audrey Fontaine	
2013	(Finland) Eetu Heino	(Germany) Olga Konon	(France) Baptiste Carême (France) Ronan Labar	(Germany) Isabel Herttrich (Germany) Carla Nelte	(Germany) Peter Käsbauer (Germany) Isabel Herttrich	
2014	(Germany) Dieter Domke	(Bulgaria) Petya Nedelcheva	(Poland) Łukasz Moreń (Poland) Wojciech Szkudlarczyk	(Russia) Ekaterina Bolotova (Russia) Evgeniya Kosetskaya	(Russia) Evgenij Dremin (Russia) Evgenia Dimova	
2015	(Russia) Vladimir Malkov	(Vietnam) Vũ Thị Trang	(Malaysia) Koo Kien Keat (Malaysia) Tan Boon Heong	(Russia) Ekaterina Bolotova (Russia) Evgeniya Kosetskaya	(Republic of Ireland) Sam Magee (Republic of Ireland) Chloe Magee	
2016	(France) Lucas Claerbout	(Turkey) Neslihan Yiğit	(Germany) Jones Ralfy Jansen (Germany) Josche Zurwonne	(Japan) Kugo Asumi (Japan) Megumi Yokoyama	(Germany) Michael Fuchs (Germany) Birgit Michels	
2017	(Spain) Pablo Abián	(Russia) Evgeniya Kosetskaya	(Germany) Mark Lamsfuß (Germany) Marvin Seidel	(Russia) Anastasia Chervyakova (Russia) Olga Morozova	(Germany) Marvin Seidel (Germany) Linda Efler	
2018	(Spain) Pablo Abián	(Hong Kong) Deng Xuan	(Germany) Bjarne Geiss (Germany) Jan Colin Völker	(Japan) Akane Araki (Japan) Riko Imai	(Russia) Rodion Alimov (Russia) Alina Davletova	
2019	(Malaysia) Iskandar Zulkarnain	(Russia) Evgeniya Kosetskaya	(Russia) Nikita Khakimov (Russia) Alexandr Zinchenko	(Japan) Yukino Nakai (Japan) Nao Ono	(Russia) Rodion Alimov (Russia) Alina Davletova	
2020	Cancelled (Note: This tournament, originally to be played from 25 to 29 November, was later cancelled due to COVID-19 pandemic in Russia.)					
2021	Cancelled (Note: This tournament, originally to be played from 7 to 11 July, was later cancelled due to COVID-19 pandemic in Russia.)					
2022	Cancelled (Note: This tournament, originally to be played from 6 to 10 July, was later cancelled due to Russian invasion of Ukraine.)					

== Performances by nation ==
Pos	Nation	MS	WS	MD	WD	XD	Total
1	Russia	3	4	3	9	6.5	25.5
2	Germany	1	2	3	1	3	10
3	France	1	0	2	0	1	4
3	Japan	0	1	0	3	0	4
3	Poland	0	1	3	0	0	4
6	Indonesia	0	1	1	0	0.5	2.5
7	Finland	2	0	0	0	0	2
7	Malaysia	1	0	1	0	0	2
7	Spain	2	0	0	0	0	2
7	Ukraine	2	0	0	0	0	2
11	Bulgaria	0	1	0	0	0	1
11	Chinese Taipei	1	0	0	0	0	1
11	Hong Kong	0	1	0	0	0	1
11	Ireland	0	0	0	0	1	1
11	Singapore	0	0	0	0	1	1
11	Turkey	0	1	0	0	0	1
11	Vietnam	0	1	0	0	0	1
Total		13	13	13	13	13	65
