= Vasily Kuznetsov (badminton) =

Russian badminton player (born 1989)

Vasily Kuznetsov Василий Кузнецов
Personal information
- Born: Vasily Nikolaevich Kuznetsov (Василий Николаевич Кузнецов); 28 June 1989 (age 37)

Sport
- Country: Russia
- Sport: Badminton

Men's singles & doubles
- Highest ranking: 232 (MS 23 May 2013); 39 (MD 17 July 2014); 114 (XD 7 May 2015)
- BWF profile

Vasily Nikolaevich Kuznetsov (Russian: Василий Николаевич Кузнецов; born 28 June 1989) is a Russian badminton player.

== Achievements ==
=== BWF International Challenge/Series ===
Men's doubles
Year	Tournament	Partner	Opponent	Score	Result
2013	Slovenian International	(Russia) Nikita Khakimov	(England) Chris Coles (England) Matthew Nottingham	21–19, 21–16	(gold) Winner
2013	Slovak Open	(Russia) Nikita Khakimov	(Switzerland) Oliver Schaller (Malaysia) Tan Bin Shen	21–9, 20–22, 21–18	(gold) Winner
2013	Norwegian International	(Russia) Nikita Khakimov	(Denmark) Alexander Bond (Denmark) Mathias Weber Estrup	23–21,21–15	(gold) Winner
2013	Turkey International	(Russia) Nikita Khakimov	(Russia) Gordey Kosenko (Russia) Aleksandr Nikolaenko	22–20, 21–19	(gold) Winner
2014	Estonian International	(Russia) Nikita Khakimov	(France) Laurent Constantin (France) Matthieu Lo Ying Ping	14–21, 21–13, 21–19	(gold) Winner
2014	Polish Open	(Russia) Nikita Khakimov	(Poland) Adam Cwalina (Poland) Przemysław Wacha	10–21, 11–21	(silver) Runner-up
2014	Slovenian International	(Russia) Nikita Khakimov	(Croatia) Zvonimir Đurkinjak (Croatia) Zvonimir Hölbling	15–21, 18–21	(silver) Runner-up
2015	Finnish International	(Russia) Nikita Khakimov	(Denmark) Nicklas Mathiasen (Denmark) Lasse Mølhede	21–16, 9–21, 21–17	(gold) Winner

Mixed doubles
Year	Tournament	Partner	Opponent	Score	Result
2013	Norwegian International	(Russia) Viktoriia Vorobeva	(Denmark) Alexander Bond (Denmark) Rikke Søby Hansen	21–19, 21–7	(gold) Winner
2013	Turkey International	(Russia) Viktoriia Vorobeva	(Finland) Anton Kaisti (Bulgaria) Stefani Stoeva	9–21, 15–21	(silver) Runner-up
2016	Czech International	(Russia) Ekaterina Bolotova	(Denmark) Mathias Bay-Smidt (Denmark) Alexandra Bøje	19–21, 15–21	(silver) Runner-up

BWF International Challenge tournament
BWF International Series tournament
BWF Future Series tournament
