= Anatoliy Yartsev =

Russian badminton player (born 1993)

Anatoliy Yartsev Анатолий Ярцев
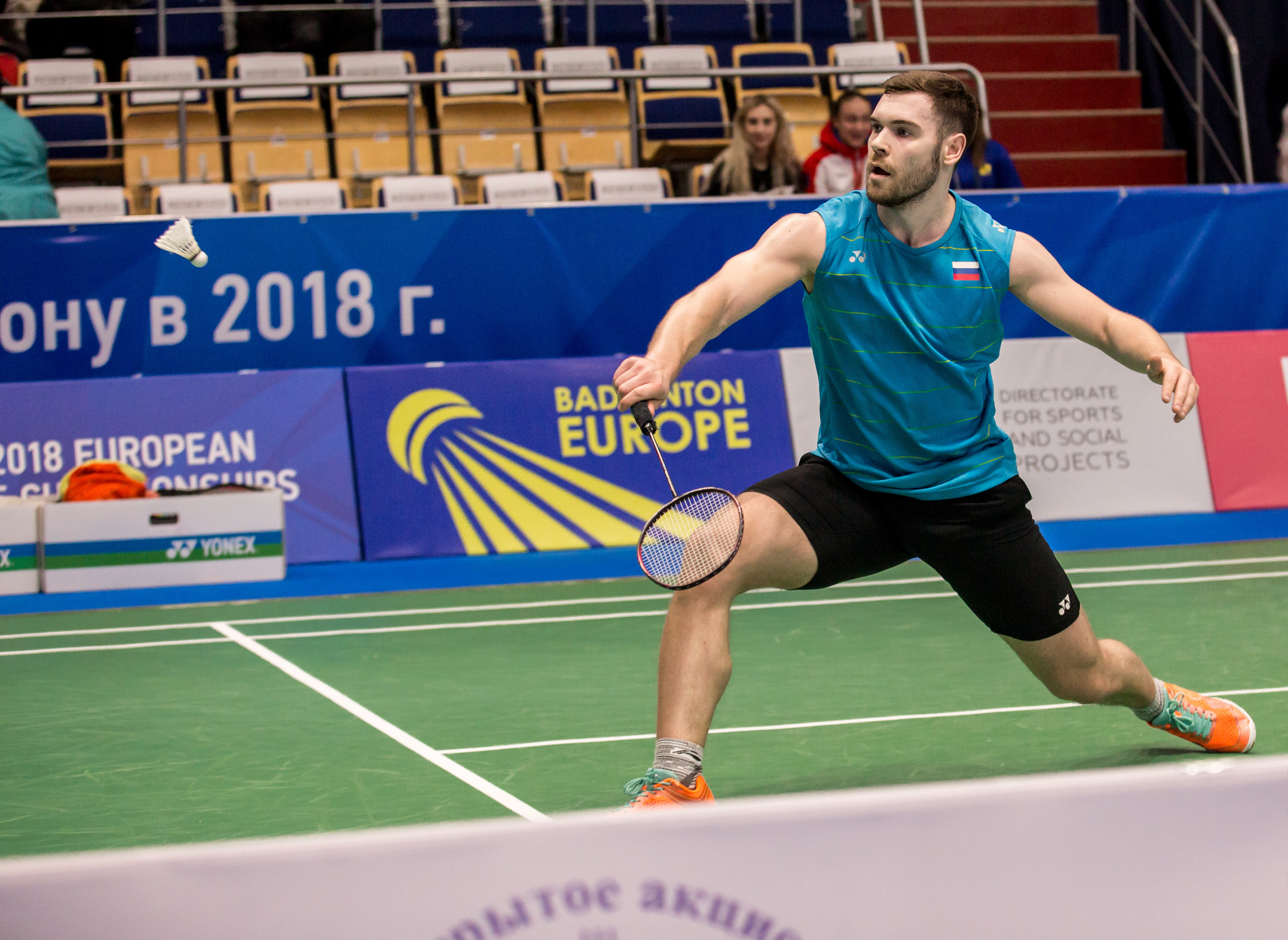
- Yartsev at the 2018 Kazan European men's team championships

Personal information
- Born: Anatoliy Dmitrievich Yartsev (Анатолий Дмитриевич Ярцев); 16 January 1993 (age 33) Chelyabinsk, Russia
- Height: 1.88 m (6 ft 2 in)
- Weight: 86 kg (190 lb)

Sport
- Country: Russia
- Sport: Badminton

Men's singles & doubles
- Highest ranking: 104 (MS, 19 January 2017); 82 (MD, 22 January 2015); 35 (XD, 23 July 2015)
- BWF profile
Medal record
Men's badminton
Representing Russia
European Mixed Team Championships
Silver medal – second place	2017 Lubin	Mixed team
Bronze medal – third place	2015 Leuven	Mixed team
European Junior Championships
Silver medal – second place	2011 Vantaa	Mixed team

Anatoliy Dmitrievich Yartsev (Russian: Анатолий Дмитриевич Ярцев; born 16 January 1993) is a Russian badminton player. He competed at the 2013 Kazan Universiade.

== Achievements ==
=== BWF International Challenge/Series (6 titles, 7 runners-up) ===
Men's singles
Year	Tournament	Opponent	Score	Result
2015	Kazakhstan International	(Russia) Vladimir Malkov	18–21, 16–21	(silver) Runner-up
2016	South Africa International	(South Africa) Jacob Maliekal	5–21, 13–21	(silver) Runner-up
2016	Botswana International	(South Africa) Jacob Maliekal	21–10, 21–18	(gold) Winner
2017	Egypt International	(England) Sam Parsons	23–21, 7–21, 14–21	(silver) Runner-up

Men's doubles
Year	Tournament	Partner	Opponent	Score	Result
2013	Lithuanian International	(Russia) Andrey Ashmarin	(Russia) Konstantin Abramov (Russia) Yaroslav Egerev	21–18, 21–16	(gold) Winner

Mixed doubles
Year	Tournament	Partner	Opponent	Score	Result
2014	Estonian International	(Russia) Evgeniya Kosetskaya	(Russia) Vitalij Durkin (Russia) Nina Vislova	9–21, 12–21	(silver) Runner-up
2014	Czech International	(Russia) Evgeniya Kosetskaya	(Sweden) Jonathan Nordh (Sweden) Emelie Fabbeke	21–18, 19–21, 19–21	(silver) Runner-up
2015	Finnish Open	(Russia) Evgeniya Kosetskaya	(France) Gaëtan Mittelheisser (France) Audrey Fontaine	21–16, 17–21, 21–10	(gold) Winner
2015	Kazakhstan International	(Russia) Evgeniya Kosetskaya	(Malaysia) Bolriffin Khairul Tor (Malaysia) Ng Sin Er	21–11, 21–12	(gold) Winner
2016	Bahrain International Challenge	(Russia) Evgeniya Kosetskaya	(Russia) Evgenij Dremin (Russia) Evgenia Dimova	15–21, 11–21	(silver) Runner-up
2016	South Africa International	(Russia) Evgeniya Kosetskaya	(South Africa) Andries Malan (South Africa) Sandra le Grange	21–13, 21–9	(gold) Winner
2016	Botswana International	(Russia) Evgeniya Kosetskaya	(Mauritius) Julien Paul (Egypt) Hadia Hosny	21–12, 21–10	(gold) Winner
2017	Estonian International	(Russia) Evgeniya Kosetskaya	(Russia) Rodion Alimov (Russia) Alina Davletova	8–21, 19–21	(silver) Runner-up

BWF International Challenge tournament
BWF International Series tournament
BWF Future Series tournament
