= Ukraine International (badminton) =

Badminton championships

The Ukraine International, Kharkiv International or Kharkov International is an open international badminton tournament in Ukraine. This tournament is one of the youngest international championships in Badminton Europe

== Previous Winners ==
Year	Men's singles	Women's singles	Men's doubles	Women's doubles	Mixed doubles
2008	(Ukraine) Dmytro Zavadsky	(Ukraine) Elena Prus	(Ukraine) Vitaly Konov (Ukraine) Dmytro Zavadsky	(Ukraine) Anna Kobceva (Russia) Maria Nikolaenko	(Ukraine) Dmytro Zavadsky (Ukraine) Mariya Diptan
2009	(Ukraine) Dmytro Zavadsky	(Denmark) Anne Hald Jensen	(Russia) Andrey Ashmarin (Russia) Andrei Ivanov	(Ukraine) Anna Kobceva (Ukraine) Elena Prus	(Ukraine) Valeriy Atrashchenkov (Ukraine) Elena Prus
2010	(Russia) Ivan Sozonov	(Ukraine) Larisa Griga	(Poland) Adam Cwalina (Poland) Michał Łogosz	(Ukraine) Marija Ulitina (Ukraine) Natalya Voytsekh	(Ukraine) Valeriy Atrashchenkov (Ukraine) Elena Prus
2011	(France) Brice Leverdez	(Germany) Olga Konon	(Russia) Vladimir Ivanov (Russia) Ivan Sozonov	(Singapore) Shinta Mulia Sari (Singapore) Yao Lei	(Germany) Michael Fuchs (Germany) Birgit Michels
2012	(Denmark) Emil Holst	(Russia) Evgeniya Kosetskaya	(France) Baptiste Carême (France) Gaëtan Mittelheisser	(France) Audrey Fontaine (France) Émilie Lefel	(Sweden) Nico Ruponen (Sweden) Amanda Högström
2013	(Ukraine) Dmytro Zavadsky	(Indonesia) Febby Angguni	(Poland) Adam Cwalina (Poland) Przemysław Wacha	(Scotland) Imogen Bankier (Bulgaria) Petya Nedelcheva	(Scotland) Robert Blair (Scotland) Imogen Bankier
2014	(Denmark) Rasmus Fladberg	(Bulgaria) Linda Zetchiri	(Ukraine) Gennadiy Natarov (Ukraine) Artem Pochtarov	(Ukraine) Natalya Voytsekh (Ukraine) Yelyzaveta Zharka	(Ukraine) Artem Pochtarov (Ukraine) Elena Prus
2015	(Sweden) Henri Hurskainen	(Germany) Olga Konon	(Thailand) Bodin Isara (Thailand) Nipitphon Phuangphuapet	(Thailand) Jongkolphan Kititharakul (Thailand) Rawinda Prajongjai	(Poland) Robert Mateusiak (Poland) Nadieżda Zięba
2016	No competition				
2017	(England) Toby Penty	(Ukraine) Natalya Voytsekh	(India) Nandagopal Kidambi (India) Rohan Kapoor	(Germany) Johanna Goliszewski (Germany) Lara Käpplein	(India) Nandagopal Kidambi (India) Mahima Aggarwal
2018	(Czech Republic) Jan Louda	(Turkey) Özge Bayrak	(India) Krishna Prasad Garaga (India) Dhruv Kapila	(Sweden) Amanda Högström (Sweden) Clara Nistad	(India) Saurabh Sharma (India) Anoushka Parikh
2019	(Netherlands) Mark Caljouw	(France) Qi Xuefei	(England) Ben Lane (England) Sean Vendy	(England) Chloe Birch (England) Lauren Smith	(Poland) Paweł Śmiłowski (Poland) Magdalena Świerczyńska
2020	Cancelled (Note: This tournament, originally to be played from 3 to 6 September, was later postponed due to COVID-19 pandemic in Ukraine.)				
2021	(India) Priyanshu Rajawat	(Ukraine) Polina Buhrova	(Malaysia) Junaidi Arif (Malaysia) Muhammad Haikal	(Germany) Stine Küspert (Germany) Emma Moszczynski	(Malaysia) Yap Roy King (Malaysia) Valeree Siow
2022	Postponed (Note: This tournament, originally to be played from 8 to 11 September, was later postponed due to the 2022 Russian invasion of Ukraine.)				
2023– 2024	No competition				

== Performances by nation ==
Updated after the 2021 edition.

Top Nations
Pos	Nation	MS	WS	MD	WD	XD	Total
1	Ukraine	3	4	2	3.5	4	16.5
2	Germany	0	2	0	2	1	5
2	India	1	0	2	0	2	5
4	Russia	1	1	2	0.5	0	4.5
5	France	1	1	1	1	0	4
5	Poland	0	0	2	0	2	4
7	Denmark	2	1	0	0	0	3
7	England	1	0	1	1	0	3
7	Sweden	1	0	0	1	1	3
10	Malaysia	0	0	1	0	1	2
10	Thailand	0	0	1	1	0	2
12	Bulgaria	0	1	0	0.5	0	1.5
12	Scotland	0	0	0	0.5	1	1.5
14	Czech Republic	1	0	0	0	0	1
14	Indonesia	0	1	0	0	0	1
14	Netherlands	1	0	0	0	0	1
14	Singapore	0	0	0	1	0	1
14	Turkey	0	1	0	0	0	1
Total		12	12	12	12	12	60
