= Victoria Dergunova =

Russian badminton player (born 1995)

Personal information
- Born: 27 December 1995 (age 30)

Sport
- Country: Russia
- Sport: Badminton

Women's singles & doubles
- Highest ranking: 209 (WS, 24 October 2013); 46 (WD, 19 March 2015); 216 (XD, 23 October 2014)
- BWF profile
Medal record
Women's badminton
Representing Russia
European Junior Championships
Bronze medal – third place	2013 Ankara	Girls' doubles

Victoria Dergunova (Russian: Виктория Дергунова; born 27 December 1995) is a Russian badminton player.

== Achievements ==
=== European Junior Championships ===
Girls' doubles
Year	Venue	Partner	Opponent	Score	Result
2013	ASKI Sport Hall; Ankara, Turkey	(Russia) Evgeniya Kosetskaya	(Bulgaria) Gabriela Stoeva (Bulgaria) Stefani Stoeva	21–19, 16–21, 16–21	Bronze

=== BWF International Challenge/Series ===
Women's doubles
Year	Tournament	Partner	Opponent	Score	Result
2014	Slovenia International	(Russia) Olga Morozova	(Bulgaria) Gabriela Stoeva (Bulgaria) Stefani Stoeva	16–21, 17–21	(silver) Runner-up
2014	Finnish International	(Russia) Olga Morozova	(Russia) Irina Khlebko (Russia) Elena Komendrovskaja	21–11, 21–15	(gold) Winner
2014	Italian International	(Russia) Olga Morozova	(Netherlands) Samantha Barning (Netherlands) Iris Tabeling	17–21, 15–21	(silver) Runner-up
2015	Estonian International	(Russia) Olga Morozova	(Denmark) Amanda Madsen (Denmark) Isabella Nielsen	21–17, 21–12	(gold) Winner

Commonwealth Youth Games tournament
BWF International Series tournament
BWF Future Series tournament
