= Sergey Sirant =

Russian badminton player (born 1994)

Sergey Sirant Сергей Сирант
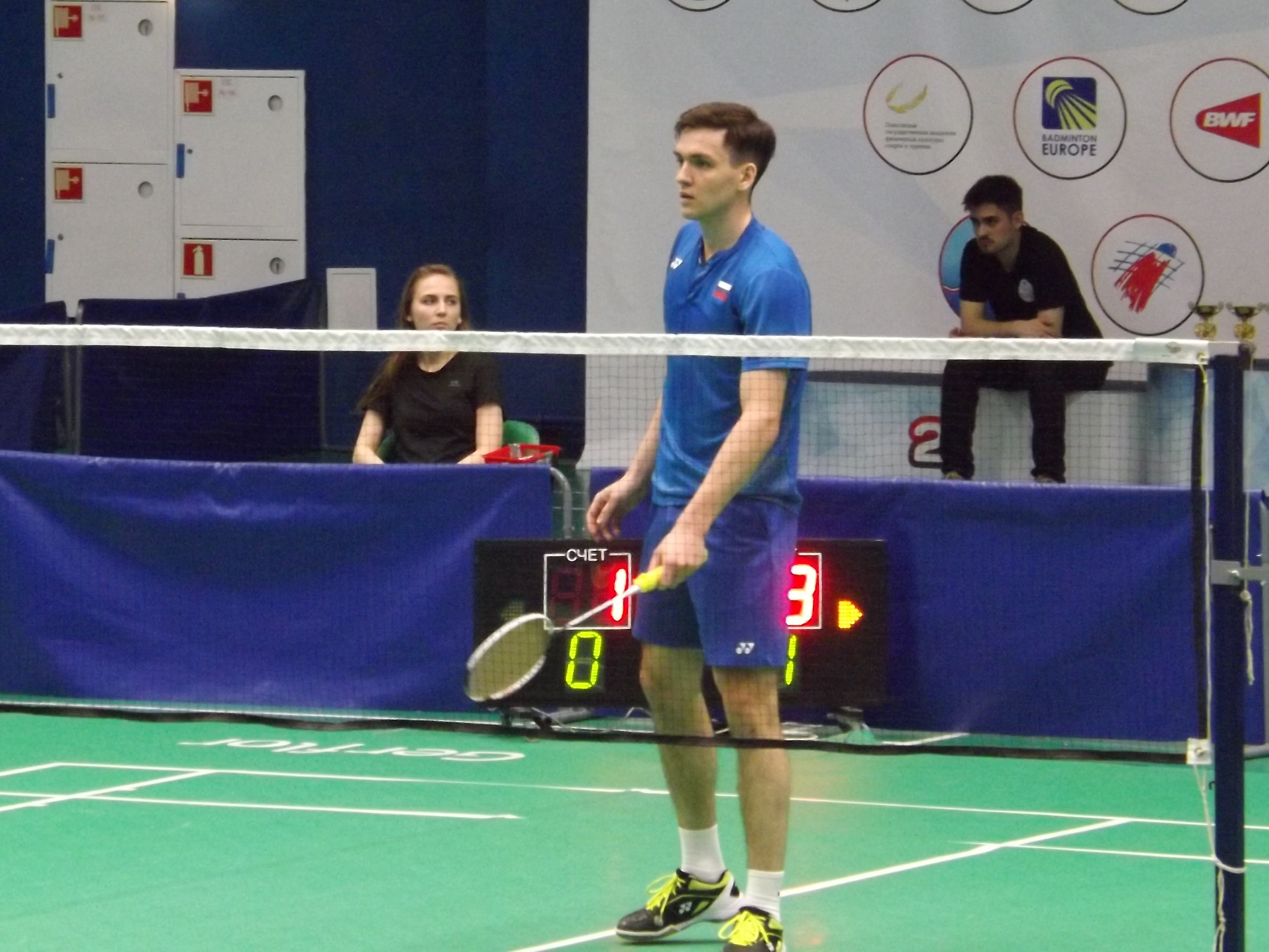
- Sirant on Olympic 2020

Personal information
- Born: Sergey Yurevich Sirant; Сергей Юрьевич Сирант; 12 April 1994 (age 32) Vladivostok, Russia
- Years active: 2009 - present
- Height: 1.86 m (6 ft 1 in)
- Weight: 77 kg (170 lb)

Sport
- Country: Russia
- Sport: Badminton
- Handedness: Left

Men's singles & doubles
- Highest ranking: 62 (MS 12 July 2018); 140 (MD 30 April 2015); 249 (XD 21 April 2011)
- BWF profile
Medal record
Men's badminton
Representing Russia
European Mixed Team Championships
Silver medal – second place	2017 Lubin	Mixed team
Bronze medal – third place	2019 Copenhagen	Mixed team
European Men's Team Championships
Bronze medal – third place	2020 Liévin	Men's team
European Junior Championships
Silver medal – second place	2011 Vantaa	Mixed team

Sergey Yurevich Sirant (Russian: Сергей Юрьевич Сирант; born 12 April 1994) is a Russian badminton player. He won his first international title at the 2015 Riga International, and clinched the Grand Prix title in the 2017 Russian Open. Sirant was the men's singles National Champion in 2017 and 2018. He competed at the 2020 Tokyo Olympics.

== Achievements ==
=== BWF Grand Prix (1 title) ===
The BWF Grand Prix had two levels, the Grand Prix and Grand Prix Gold. It was a series of badminton tournaments sanctioned by the Badminton World Federation (BWF) and played between 2007 and 2017.

Men's singles
Year	Tournament	Opponent	Score	Result
2017	Russian Open	(Russia) Vladimir Malkov	13–11, 11–5, 6–11, 7–11, 11–4	(gold) Winner

BWF Grand Prix Gold tournament
BWF Grand Prix tournament

=== BWF International Challenge/Series (1 title, 5 runners-up) ===
Men's singles
Year	Tournament	Opponent	Score	Result
2015	Riga International	(Slovenia) Iztok Utroša	21–16, 22–20	(gold) Winner
2016	Lithuanian International	(Finland) Kasper Lehikoinen	12–21, 18–21	(silver) Runner-up
2016	Yonex / K&D Graphics International	(Japan) Riichi Takeshita	13–21, 18–21	(silver) Runner-up
2018	Brazil International	(Brazil) Ygor Coelho	18–21, 14–21	(silver) Runner-up
2019	Kazakhstan International	(Denmark) Ditlev Jæger Holm	13–21, 17–21	(silver) Runner-up

Men's doubles
Year	Tournament	Partner	Opponent	Score	Result
2014	Lithuanian International	(Russia) Stanislav Pukhov	(Russia) Denis Grachev (Russia) Artem Karpov	Walkover	(silver) Runner-up

BWF International Challenge tournament
BWF International Series tournament
BWF Future Series tournament
