= Denis Grachev (badminton) =

Russian badminton player (born 1992)

Personal information
- Born: Denis Valerevich Grachev (Денис Валерьевич Грачёв); 18 January 1992 (age 34) Vladivostok, Russia
- Years active: 2004
- Height: 1.89 m (6 ft 2 in)
- Weight: 78 kg (172 lb)

Sport
- Country: Russia
- Sport: Badminton
- Handedness: Left

Men's singles & doubles
- Highest ranking: 159 (MS 2 June 2011); 38 (MD 15 June 2017); 64 (XD 12 March 2019)
- BWF profile
Medal record
Men's badminton
Representing Russia
European Men's Team Championships
| Bronze medal – third place | 2020 Liévin | Men's team |
European Junior Championships
| Silver medal – second place | 2011 Vantaa | Mixed team |

Denis Valerevich Grachev (Russian: Денис Валерьевич Грачёв; born 18 January 1992) is a Russian badminton player. He educated in the School of Arts, Culture and Sports at the Far Eastern Federal University, and was a champion of the 2014 National University Championships in the men's singles and doubles events. Grachev was part of the Russian national team that won the bronze medal at the 2020 European Men's Team Championships.

== Achievements ==
=== BWF International Challenge/Series (5 titles, 2 runners-up) ===
Men's doubles
| Year | Tournament | Partner | Opponent | Score | Result |
|---|---|---|---|---|---|
| 2014 | Lithuanian International | (Russia) Artem Karpov | (Russia) Stanislav Pukhov (Russia) Sergey Sirant | Walkover | (gold) Winner |
| 2016 | Bahrain International | (Russia) Evgenij Dremin | (India) Vighnesh Devlekar (India) Rohan Kapoor | 21–18, 21–17 | (gold) Winner |
| 2017 | Brazil International | (Russia) Evgenij Dremin | (Czech Republic) Adam Mendrek (Germany) Jonathan Persson | 21–17, 21–16 | (gold) Winner |

Mixed doubles
| Year | Tournament | Partner | Opponent | Score | Result |
|---|---|---|---|---|---|
| 2010 | Cyprus International | (Russia) Anastasia Chervyakova | (Denmark) Niclas Nøhr (Denmark) Lena Grebak | 13–21, 21–18, 12–21 | (silver) Runner-up |
| 2015 | Riga International | (Russia) Anastasia Chervyakova | (Denmark) Mads Emil Christensen (Denmark) Cecilie Sentow | 21–18, 21–17 | (gold) Winner |
| 2016 | Lithuanian International | (Russia) Ekaterina Bolotova | (Poland) Paweł Śmiłowski (Poland) Magdalena Świerczyńska | 21–11, 21–16 | (gold) Winner |
| 2018 | Dubai International | (Russia) Ekaterina Bolotova | (South Korea) Yoo Yeon-seong (South Korea) Park So-young | 14–21, 21–17, 14–21 | (silver) Runner-up |

BWF International Challenge tournament
BWF International Series tournament
BWF Future Series tournament
