= Nikita Khakimov =

Russian badminton player (born 1988)

Personal information
- Born: Nikita Dmitrievich Khakimov (Никита Дмитриевич Хакимов); 13 June 1988 (age 38) Moscow, Russian SFSR, Soviet Union

Sport
- Country: Russia
- Sport: Badminton

Men's singles & doubles
- Highest ranking: 130 (MS 27 June 2013); 39 (MD 17 July 2014); 180 (XD 21 January 2010)
- BWF profile
Medal record
Men's badminton
Representing Russia
European Men's Team Championships
Bronze medal – third place	2020 Liévin	Men's team

Nikita Dmitrievich Khakimov (Russian: Никита Дмитриевич Хакимов; born 13 June 1988) is a Russian badminton player. Khakimov educated economics at the Moscow State Forest University, and competed at the 2015 Summer Universiade in Gwangju, South Korea. Khakimov was part of the Russian national team that won the bronze medal at the 2020 European Men's Team Championships.

== Achievements ==
=== BWF International Challenge/Series ===
Men's doubles
Year	Tournament	Partner	Opponent	Score	Result
2013	Slovenian International	(Russia) Vaslily Kuznetsov	(England) Chris Coles (England) Matthew Nottingham	21–19, 21–16	(gold) Winner
2013	Slovak Open	(Russia) Vasily Kuznetsov	(Switzerland) Oliver Schaller (Malaysia) Tan Bin Shen	21–9, 20–22, 21–18	(gold) Winner
2013	Norwegian International	(Russia) Vasily Kuznetsov	(Denmark) Alexander Bond (Denmark) Mathias Weber Estrup	23–21, 21–15	(gold) Winner
2013	Turkey International	(Russia) Vasily Kuznetsov	(Russia) Gordey Kosenko (Russia) Aleksandr Nikolaenko	22–20, 21–19	(gold) Winner
2014	Estonian International	(Russia) Vasily Kuznetsov	(France) Laurent Constantin (France) Matthieu Lo Ying Ping	14–21, 21–13, 21–19	(gold) Winner
2014	Polish Open	(Russia) Vasily Kuznetsov	(Poland) Adam Cwalina (Poland) Przemysław Wacha	10–21, 11–21	(silver) Runner-up
2014	Slovenian International	(Russia) Vasily Kuznetsov	(Croatia) Zvonimir Đurkinjak (Croatia) Zvonimir Hölbling	15–21, 18–21	(silver) Runner-up
2015	Finnish International	(Russia) Vasily Kuznetsov	(Denmark) Nicklas Mathiasen (Denmark) Lasse Mølhede	21–16, 9–21, 21–17	(gold) Winner
2018	Dutch International	(Russia) Andrey Parakhodin	(India) Arun George (India) Sanyam Shukla	19–21, 19–21	(silver) Runner-up
2019	White Nights	(Russia) Alexandr Zinchenko	(Russia) Vitalij Durkin (Russia) Nikolai Ukk	22–20, 21–16	(gold) Winner

Mixed doubles
Year	Tournament	Partner	Opponent	Score	Result
2009	Portugal International	(Russia) Liubov Chudentseva	(Poland) Łukasz Moreń (Poland) Natalia Pocztowiak	13–21, 14–21	(silver) Runner-up

BWF International Challenge tournament
BWF International Series tournament
BWF Future Series tournament
