= Natalia Perminova =

Russian badminton player (born 1991)

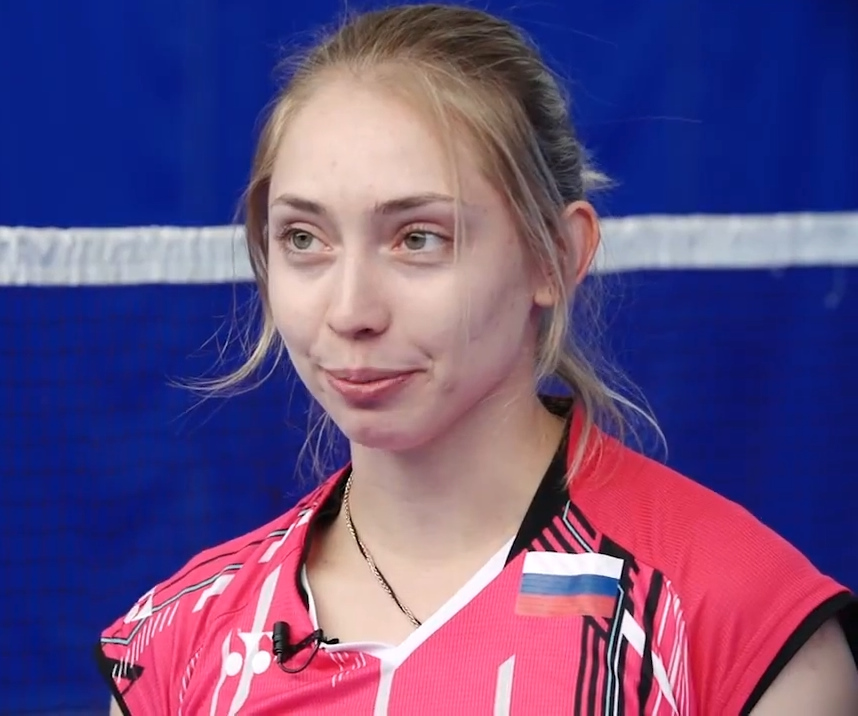
- Perminova in 2016

Personal information
- Born: Natalia Andreevna Perminova (Наталья Андреевна Перминова); 14 November 1991 (age 34) Yekaterinburg, Russia
- Height: 1.66 m (5 ft 5 in)
- Weight: 56 kg (123 lb)

Sport
- Country: Russia
- Sport: Badminton
- Handedness: Right
- Coached by: Yuri Skripin

Women's singles & doubles
- Highest ranking: 38 (WS 23 October 2014); 95 (WD 22 October 2009); 226 (XD 17 December 2009)
- BWF profile
Medal record
Women's badminton
Representing Russia
European Mixed Team Championships
Silver medal – second place	2017 Lubin	Mixed team
Bronze medal – third place	2013 Moscow	Mixed team
European Women's Team Championships
Silver medal – second place	2014 Basel	Women's team
Bronze medal – third place	2018 Kazan	Women's team
European Junior Championships
Bronze medal – third place	2009 Milan	Girls' singles

Natalia Andreevna Perminova (Russian: Наталья Андреевна Перминова; born 14 November 1991) is a Russian badminton player. She represented her country at the 2016 Summer Olympics in Rio de Janeiro, Brazil.

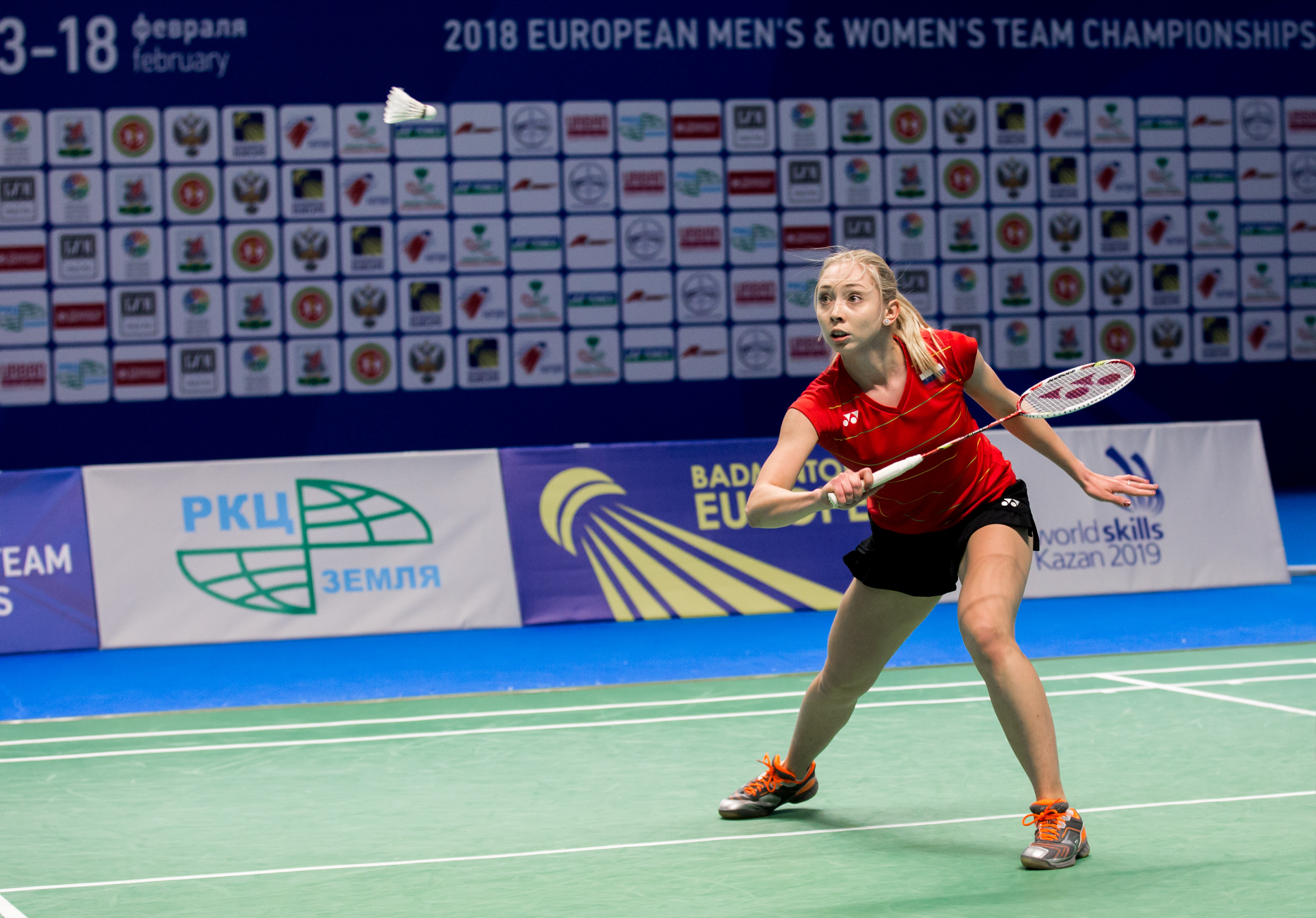
Perminova played at the 2018 Kazan European Women's Team Championships.

== Achievements ==
=== European Junior Championships ===
Girls' singles
Year	Venue	Opponent	Score	Result
2009	Federal Technical Centre - Palabadminton; Milan, Italy	(Denmark) Anne Hald	12–21, 21–12, 19–21	Bronze

=== BWF International Challenge/Series (3 titles, 1 runner-up) ===
Women's singles
Year	Tournament	Opponent	Score	Result
2013	Estonian International	(Denmark) Line Kjærsfeldt	21–13, 18–21, 18–21	(silver) Runner-up
2013	Croatian International	(Denmark) Sandra-Maria Jensen	21–14, 21–15	(gold) Winner
2019	Kazakhstan International	(Moldova) Vlada Ginga	21–10, 21–8	(gold) Winner

Women's doubles
Year	Tournament	Partner	Opponent	Score	Result
2009	Cyprus International	(Russia) Anastasia Chervyakova	(New Zealand) Danielle Barry (New Zealand) Donna Haliday	21–18, 22–20	(gold) Winner

BWF International Challenge tournament
BWF International Series tournament
