= 2010 All England Super Series =

Badminton championships

Tournament details
- Dates: 9 March 2010– 14 March 2010
- Edition: 100th
- Total prize money: US$200,000
- Venue: National Indoor Arena
- Location: Birmingham, England

The 2010 All-England Super Series was a badminton tournament held in Birmingham, England, Great Britain from 9 March 2010 to 14 March 2010. It was the third competition in the BWF 2010 Super Series. It was held in the National Indoor Arena.

The draws were released on 23 February 2010.

== Men's singles ==
=== Seeds ===
1. (Malaysia) Lee Chong Wei (Champion)
2. (China) Lin Dan
3. (China) Chen Jin
4. (Indonesia) Taufik Hidayat
5. (Denmark) Peter Gade
6. (China) Bao Chunlai
7. (Vietnam) Nguyen Tien Minh
8. (Denmark) Jan Ø. Jørgensen

=== Results ===
1st round
1	(Malaysia) Lee Chong Wei	21	21
(India) Chetan Anand	15	16
(Indonesia) Sony Dwi Kuncoro	21	21
(China) Du Pengyu	19	10
8	(Denmark) Jan Ø. Jørgensen	16	10
(China) Chen Long	21	21
Q4	(South Korea) Shon Wan-ho	21	17	21
(Hong Kong) Chan Yan Kit	13	21	18
4	(Indonesia) Taufik Hidayat	17	21	21
(Hong Kong) Hu Yun	21	11	12
(Netherlands) Eric Pang	10	11
(England) Andrew Smith	21	21
5	(Denmark) Peter Gade	21	21
(Netherlands) Dicky Palyama	17	17
(Malaysia) Wong Choong Hann	21	16	12
(Indonesia) Simon Santoso	17	21	21
Q2	(Sweden) Henri Hurskainen	12	18
(Denmark) Joachim Persson	21	21
(Japan) Kenichi Tago	21	21
7	(Vietnam) Nguyen Tien Minh	10	17
(England) Rajiv Ouseph	21	21
Q3	(France) Matthieu Lo Ying Ping	17	19
(Indonesia) Dionysius Hayom Rumbaka	16	21	20
3	(China) Chen Jin	21	19	22
(Japan) Sho Sasaki	13	11
(South Korea) Park Sung-hwan	21	21
(Germany) Marc Zwiebler	7	7
6	(China) Bao Chunlai	21	21
(Malaysia) Muhammad Hafiz Hashim	21	21
(Chinese Taipei) Hsieh Yu-hsing	11	5
Q1	(Denmark) Christian Lind Thomsen	16	15
2	(China) Lin Dan	21	21

2nd round
1	(Malaysia) Lee Chong Wei	21	21
(Indonesia) Sony Dwi Kuncoro	11	17
(China) Chen Long	18	21	19
(South Korea) Shon Wan-ho	21	18	21
4	(Indonesia) Taufik Hidayat	21	21
(England) Andrew Smith	18	14
5	(Denmark) Peter Gade	24	21
(Indonesia) Simon Santoso	22	18
(Denmark) Joachim Persson	24	15	9
(Japan) Kenichi Tago	22	21	21
(England) Rajiv Ouseph	21	8
3	(China) Chen Jin	23	21
(South Korea) Park Sung-hwan	5	10
6	(China) Bao Chunlai	21	21
(Malaysia) Muhammad Hafiz Hashim	14	18
2	(China) Lin Dan	21	21

Quarterfinals
1	(Malaysia) Lee Chong Wei	14	21	21
(South Korea) Shon Wan-ho	21	14	14
4	(Indonesia) Taufik Hidayat	22	20	20
5	(Denmark) Peter Gade	20	22	22
(Japan) Kenichi Tago	22	19	21
3	(China) Chen Jin	20	21	13
6	(China) Bao Chunlai	21	18	21
2	(China) Lin Dan	16	21	17

Semifinals
1	(Malaysia) Lee Chong Wei	21	21
5	(Denmark) Peter Gade	17	14
Finals
(Malaysia) Lee Chong Wei	21	21
(Japan) Kenichi Tago	19	19
(Japan) Kenichi Tago	18	22	21
(China) Bao Chunlai	21	20	18

== Women's singles ==
=== Seeds ===
1. (China) Wang Yihan
2. (China) Wang Lin
3. (China) Jiang Yanjiao
4. (France) Pi Hongyan
5. (China) Wang Xin
6. (China) Lu Lan
7. (India) Saina Nehwal
8. (Hong Kong) Zhou Mi

=== Results ===
1st round
1	(China) Wang Yihan	21	21
(Russia) Ella Diehl	19	19
(Germany) Nicole Grether	16	13
Q3	(Japan) Yu Hirayama	21	21
8	(Hong Kong) Zhou Mi	21	21
(South Korea) Sung Ji-hyun	9	15
(Hong Kong) Wang Chen	22	21
(Indonesia) Adrianti Firdasari	20	18
3	(China) Jiang Yanjiao	21	21
(Malaysia) Wong Mew Choo	18	9
(Indonesia) Maria Febe Kusumastuti	21	15	21
(China) Wang Shixian	13	21	16
5	(China) Wang Xin	21	21
Q2	(Poland) Olga Konon	8	10
(Japan) Ai Goto	21	11	21
(Netherlands) Yao Jie	14	21	16
(South Korea) Bae Seung-hee	14	21	21
Q1	(Bulgaria) Linda Zechiri	21	17	16
(Netherlands) Judith Meulendijks	18	11
7	(India) Saina Nehwal	21	21
(Bulgaria) Petya Nedelcheva	21	10
Q4	(South Korea) Bae Youn-joo	23	21
(Germany) Juliane Schenk	21	21	21
4	(France) Pi Hongyan	23	12	15
(Scotland) Susan Eglestaff	21	21
(Japan) Sayaka Sato	9	19
(Hong Kong) Yip Pui Yin	6	12
6	(China) Lu Lan	21	21
(South Korea) Kim Moon-hi	19	16
(Denmark) Tine Rasmussen	21	21
(Japan) Eriko Hirose	10	21	21
2	(China) Wang Lin	21	16	18

2nd round
1	(China) Wang Yihan	21	21
(Japan) Yu Hirayama	16	16
8	(Hong Kong) Zhou Mi	21	21
(Hong Kong) Wang Chen	13	15
3	(China) Jiang Yanjiao	21	21
(Indonesia) Maria Febe Kusumastuti	9	14
(China) Wang Xin	21	21
(Japan) Ai Goto	12	13
(South Korea) Bae Seung-hee	11	20
7	(India) Saina Nehwal	21	22
Q4	(South Korea) Bae Youn-joo	14	16
(Germany) Juliane Schenk	21	21
(Scotland) Susan Eglestaff	23	22	17
6	(China) Lu Lan	25	20	21
(Denmark) Tine Rasmussen	21	21
(Japan) Eriko Hirose	12	12

Quarterfinals
1	(China) Wang Yihan	21	11	21
8	(Hong Kong) Zhou Mi	9	21	17
3	(China) Jiang Yanjiao	15	14
(China) Wang Xin	21	21
7	(India) Saina Nehwal	21	21
(Germany) Juliane Schenk	8	14
6	(China) Lu Lan	21	21	11
(Denmark) Tine Rasmussen	16	23	21

Semifinals
1	(China) Wang Yihan	21	26
(China) Wang Xin	17	24
Finals
(China) Wang Yihan	14	21	19
(Denmark) Tine Rasmussen	21	18	21
7	(India) Saina Nehwal	19	17
(Denmark) Tine Rasmussen	21	21

== Men's doubles ==
=== Seeds ===
1. (Malaysia) Koo Kien Keat / Tan Boon Heong
2. (South Korea) Jung Jae-sung / Lee Yong-dae
3. (Indonesia) Markis Kido / Hendra Setiawan
4. (Denmark) Mathias Boe / Carsten Mogensen
5. (China) Cai Yun / Fu Haifeng
6. (Indonesia) Alvent Yulianto / Hendra Aprida Gunawan
7. (China) Guo Zhendong / Xu Chen
8. (Malaysia) Choong Tan Fook / Lee Wan Wah

=== Results ===
Quarterfinals
(Denmark) Lars Paaske (Denmark) Jonas Rasmussen	21	22
(Malaysia) Gan Teik Chai (Malaysia) Tan Bin Shen	18	20
3	(Indonesia) Markis Kido (Indonesia) Hendra Setiawan	21	21
8	(Malaysia) Choong Tan Fook (Malaysia) Lee Wan Wah	17	11
5	(China) Cai Yun (China) Fu Haifeng	17	21	18
4	(Denmark) Mathias Boe (Denmark) Carsten Mogensen	21	18	21
7	(China) Guo Zhendong (China) Xu Chen	21	21
2	(South Korea) Lee Yong-dae (South Korea) Jung Jae-sung	18	10

Semifinals
(Denmark) Lars Paaske (Denmark) Jonas Rasmussen	14	21	23
3	(Indonesia) Markis Kido (Indonesia) Hendra Setiawan	21	13	21
4	(Denmark) Mathias Boe (Denmark) Carsten Mogensen	21	21
7	(China) Guo Zhendong (China) Xu Chen	16	16

Finals
(Denmark) Lars Paaske (Denmark) Jonas Rasmussen	21	21	26
4	(Denmark) Mathias Boe (Denmark) Carsten Mogensen	23	19	24

== Women's doubles ==
=== Seeds ===
1. (China) Du Jing / Yu Yang (champions)
2. (China) Ma Jin / Wang Xiaoli
3. (China) Cheng Shu / Zhao Yunlei
4. (Malaysia) Chin Eei Hui / Wong Pei Tty
5. (Chinese Taipei) Cheng Wen-hsing / Chien Yu-chin
6. (Japan) Miyuki Maeda / Satoko Suetsuna
7. (South Korea) Ha Jung-eun / Lee Kyung-won
8. (Japan) Mizuki Fujii / Reika Kakiiwa

=== Results ===
Quarterfinals
1	(China) Du Jing (China) Yu Yang	21	21
6	(Japan) Miyuki Maeda (Japan) Satoko Suetsuna	11	9
(Indonesia) Meiliana Jauhari (Indonesia) Greysia Polii	23	21	17
(China) Pan Pan (China) Tian Qing	25	17	21
7	(South Korea) Ha Jung-eun (South Korea) Lee Kyung-won	12	19
3	(China) Cheng Shu (China) Zhao Yunlei	21	21
5	(Chinese Taipei) Cheng Wen-hsing (Chinese Taipei) Chien Yu-chin	12	15
2	(China) Ma Jin (China) Wang Xiaoli	21	21

Semifinals
1	(China) Du Jing (China) Yu Yang	24	21
(China) Pan Pan (China) Tian Qing	22	10
3	(China) Cheng Shu (China) Zhao Yunlei	21	21
2	(China) Ma Jin (China) Wang Xiaoli	17	18

Finals
1	(China) Du Jing (China) Yu Yang	20	21	21
3	(China) Cheng Shu (China) Zhao Yunlei	22	16	13

== Mixed doubles ==
=== Seeds ===
1. (China) Zheng Bo / Ma Jin
2. (Indonesia) Nova Widianto / Lilyana Natsir
3. (South Korea) Lee Yong-dae / Lee Hyo-jung
4. (China) He Hanbin / Yu Yang
5. (Denmark) Joachim Fischer Nielsen / Christinna Pedersen
6. (China) Tao Jiaming / Zhang Yawen
7. (Denmark) Thomas Laybourn / Kamilla Rytter Juhl
8. (Indonesia) Hendra Aprida Gunawan / Vita Marissa

=== Results ===
Quarterfinals
Q	(China) Zhang Nan (China) Zhao Yunlei	21	21
8	(Indonesia) Hendra Aprida Gunawan (Indonesia) Vita Marissa	16	18
4	(China) He Hanbin (China) Yu Yang	13	21	21
6	(China) Tao Jiaming (China) Zhang Yawen	21	18	18
(England) Anthony Clark (England) Heather Olver	19	17
3	(South Korea) Lee Yong-dae (South Korea) Lee Hyo-jung	21	21
(England) Nathan Robertson (England) Jenny Wallwork	18	19
2	(Indonesia) Nova Widianto (Indonesia) Lilyana Natsir	21	21

Semifinals
Q	(China) Zhang Nan (China) Zhao Yunlei	23	21
4	(China) He Hanbin (China) Yu Yang	21	14
3	(South Korea) Lee Yong-dae (South Korea) Lee Hyo-jung	16	21	8
2	(Indonesia) Nova Widianto (Indonesia) Lilyana Natsir	21	18	21

Finals
Q	(China) Zhang Nan (China) Zhao Yunlei	21	23	21
2	(Indonesia) Nova Widianto (Indonesia) Lilyana Natsir	18	25	18

Preceded by 2010 Malaysia Super Series	BWF Super Series	Succeeded by 2010 Swiss Super Series
