= 2010 Swiss Open Super Series =

The 2010 Swiss Open Super Series is a top level badminton competition which will be held from March 16, 2010 to March 21, 2010 in Basel, Switzerland. It is the fourth BWF Super Series competition on the 2010 BWF Super Series schedule. The total purse for the event is $200,000. St. Jakobshalle was host the competition. This was the 20th anniversary of the swiss Open tournament, since the tournament was held in St. Jakobshalle and entered the high-level World Badminton Grand Prix event in 1991.

== Men's singles ==
=== Seeds ===
1. (Malaysia) Lee Chong Wei
2. (China) Lin Dan
3. (China) Chen Jin
4. (Indonesia) Taufik Hidayat
5. (Denmark) Peter Gade
6. (Denmark) Jan Ø. Jørgensen
7. (Vietnam) Nguyễn Tiến Minh
8. (China) Chen Long

=== Results ===
1st round
PFQ	(Denmark) Hans-Kristian Vittinghus	16	12
(China) Du Pengyu	21	21
(Japan) Kenichi Tago	12	21	21
(India) Chetan Anand	21	15	18
6	(Denmark) Jan Ø. Jørgensen	14	10
(Netherlands) Dicky Palyama	21	21
(Hong Kong) Hu Yun	21	25
(England) Rajiv Ouseph	14	23
3	(China) Chen Jin	21	21
(Germany) Marc Zwiebler	14	10
(Denmark) Joachim Persson	21	13	21
(Hong Kong) Chan Yan Kit	18	21	14
7	(Vietnam) Nguyễn Tiến Minh	21	21
Q2	(Ukraine) Valeri Atrashchenkov	11	10
(United Kingdom) Carl Baxter	15	22	21
(Thailand) Tanongsak Saensomboonsuk	21	20	16
(Indonesia) Dionysius Hayom Rumbaka	21	21
(Netherlands) Eric Pang	14	16
WC	(Switzerland) Christian Bösiger	11	9
8	(China) Chen Long	21	21
PFQ	(Japan) Kazushi Yamada	21	11r
(Chinese Taipei) Hsieh Yu-hsing	11	3
Q1	(Ukraine) Dmytro Zavadsky	18	21	12
4	(Indonesia) Taufik Hidayat	21	19	21
Q3	(Lithuania) Kestutis Navickas	13	13
(South Korea) Park Sung-hwan	21	21
(Japan) Sho Sasaki	12	13
5	(Denmark) Peter Gade	21	21
Q4	(South Korea) Shon Wan-ho	21	15	22
(India) Anup Sridhar	13	21	20
(Poland) Przemyslaw Wacha	10	12
2	(China) Lin Dan	21	21

2nd round
(China) Du Pengyu	21	21
(Japan) Kenichi Tago	12	18
(Netherlands) Dicky Palyama	21	11	13
(Hong Kong) Hu Yun	10	21	21
3	(China) Chen Jin	21	21
(Denmark) Joachim Persson	19	11
7	(Vietnam) Nguyễn Tiến Minh	21	21
(United Kingdom) Carl Baxter	18	13
(Indonesia) Dionysius Hayom Rumbaka	12	21	15
8	(China) Chen Long	21	17	21
PFQ	(Japan) Kazushi Yamada	21	21
4	(Indonesia) Taufik Hidayat	15	12
(South Korea) Park Sung-hwan	15	16
5	(Denmark) Peter Gade	21	21
Q	(South Korea) Shon Wan-ho	11	14
2	(China) Lin Dan	21	21

Quarterfinals
(China) Du Pengyu	24	21
(Hong Kong) Hu Yun	22	17
3	(China) Chen Jin	21	21
7	(Vietnam) Nguyễn Tiến Minh	16	11
8	(China) Chen Long	21	21
PFQ	(Japan) Kazushi Yamada	16	11
5	(Denmark) Peter Gade	21	21
2	(China) Lin Dan	16	17

Semifinals
(China) Du Pengyu	15	6
3	(China) Chen Jin	21	21
Finals
3	(China) Chen Jin	12	21	21
8	(China) Chen Long	21	15	17
8	(China) Chen Long	22	21
5	(Denmark) Peter Gade	20	17

== Women's singles ==
=== Seeds ===
1. (China) Wang Yihan
2. (China) Jiang Yanjiao
3. (France) Pi Hongyan
4. (China) Lu Lan
5. (Hong Kong) Zhou Mi
6. (China) Wang Shixian
7. (Denmark) Tine Rasmussen
8. (Germany) Juliane Schenk

=== Results ===
1st round
1	(China) Wang Yihan	21	21
(Netherlands) Yao Jie	18	12
(Netherlands) Rachel van Cutsen	21	16	17
(Hong Kong) Yip Pui Yin	19	21	21
6	(China) Wang Shixian	21	21
Q4	(Canada) Anna Rice	11	11
(Hong Kong) Wang Chen	21	21
(Bulgaria) Linda Zechiri	16	11
4	(China) Lu Lan	21	21
Q3	(Japan) Yu Hirayama	17	13
(Japan) Eriko Hirose	21	21
(Ukraine) Larisa Griga	10	11
PFQ	(England) Elizabeth Cann	20	18
WC	(Switzerland) Jeanine Cicognini	22	21
(Indonesia) Maria Febe Kusumastuti	21	17	16
(Russia) Ella Diehl	17	21	21
(South Korea) Kim Moon-hi	21	21
Q1	(Switzerland) Sabrina Jaquet	14	9
(South Korea) Bae Youn-joo	21	21
5	(Hong Kong) Zhou Mi	11	13
(Bulgaria) Petya Nedelcheva	19	18
(Japan) Ai Goto	21	21
(Japan) Sayaka Sato	21	10	18
3	(France) Pi Hongyan	11	21	21
(Finland) Anu Nieminen	11	12
(South Korea) Bae Seung-hee	21	21
(South Korea) Sung Ji-hyun	25	13	15
8	(Germany) Juliane Schenk	23	21	21
(Germany) Nicole Grether	19	23
Q2	(Chinese Taipei) Chen Hsiao Huan	21	25
(Scotland) Susan Eglestaff	7	3
2	(China) Jiang Yanjiao	21	21

2nd round
1	(China) Wang Yihan	17	22
(Hong Kong) Yip Pui Yin	21	24
6	(China) Wang Shixian	21	21
(Hong Kong) Wang Chen	14	15
(China) Lu Lan	21	21
(Japan) Eriko Hirose	15	13
WC	(Switzerland) Jeanine Cicognini	19	17
(Russia) Ella Diehl	21	21
(South Korea) Kim Moon-hi	20	17
(South Korea) Bae Youn-joo	22	21
(Japan) Ai Goto	19	18
3	(France) Pi Hongyan	21	21
(South Korea) Bae Seung-hee	21	20	16
8	(Germany) Juliane Schenk	16	22	21
Q2	(Chinese Taipei) Chen Hsiao Huan	16	5
2	(China) Jiang Yanjiao	21	21

Quarterfinals
(Hong Kong) Yip Pui Yin	8	22	12
(China) Wang Shixian	21	20	21
4	(China) Lu Lan	20	15
(Russia) Ella Diehl	22	21
(South Korea) Bae Youn-joo	21	24
3	(France) Pi Hongyan	12	22
8	(Germany) Juliane Schenk	7	18
2	(China) Jiang Yanjiao	21	21

Semifinals
6	(China) Wang Shixian	21	21
(Russia) Ella Diehl	13	10
Finals
6	(China) Wang Shixian	21	21
2	(China) Jiang Yanjiao	15	19
(South Korea) Bae Youn-joo	9	8
2	(China) Jiang Yanjiao	21	21

== Men's doubles ==
=== Seeds ===
1. (Malaysia) Koo Kien Keat / Tan Boon Heong
2. (South Korea) Jung Jae-sung / Lee Yong-dae
3. (Indonesia) Markis Kido / Hendra Setiawan
4. (Denmark) Mathias Boe / Carsten Mogensen
5. (Indonesia) Alvent Yulianto / Hendra Aprida Gunawan
6. (China) Guo Zhendong / Xu Chen
7. (United States) Howard Bach / Tony Gunawan
8. (Denmark) Lars Paaske / Jonas Rasmussen

=== Results ===
Quarterfinals
1	(Malaysia) Koo Kien Keat (Malaysia) Tan Boon Heong	21	21
(South Korea) Kim Ki-jung (South Korea) Shin Baek-cheol	17	14
4	(Denmark) Mathias Boe (Denmark) Carsten Mogensen	21	14	21
6	(China) Guo Zhendong (China) Xu Chen	12	21	17
(Japan) Hirokatsu Hashimoto (Japan) Noriyasu Hirata	21	29
(Chinese Taipei) Chen Hung-ling (Chinese Taipei) Lin Yu-lang	17	27
8	(Denmark) Lars Paaske (Denmark) Jonas Rasmussen	21	20	8
(South Korea) Ko Sung-hyun (South Korea) Yoo Yeon-seong	16	22	21

Semifinals
1	(Malaysia) Koo Kien Keat (Malaysia) Tan Boon Heong	21	28
4	(Denmark) Mathias Boe (Denmark) Carsten Mogensen	13	26
(Japan) Hirokatsu Hashimoto (Japan) Noriyasu Hirata	13	13
(South Korea) Ko Sung-hyun (South Korea) Yoo Yeon-seong	21	21

Finals
1	(Malaysia) Koo Kien Keat (Malaysia) Tan Boon Heong	18	16
(South Korea) Ko Sung-hyun (South Korea) Yoo Yeon-seong	21	21

== Women's doubles ==
=== Seeds ===
1. (Malaysia) Chin Eei Hui / Wong Pei Tty
2. (Japan) Mizuki Fujii / Reika Kakiiwa
3. (Chinese Taipei) Cheng Wen-hsing / Chien Yu-chin
4. (Bulgaria) Petya Nedelcheva / (Russia) Anastasia Russkikh
5. (Japan) Miyuki Maeda / Satoko Suetsuna
6. (China) Du Jing / Pan Pan
7. (China) Tian Qing / Yu Yang
8. (South Korea) Ha Jung-eun / Lee Kyung-won

=== Results ===
Quarterfinals
1	(Malaysia) Chin Eei Hui (Malaysia) Wong Pei Tty	21	18	10
5	(Japan) Miyuki Maeda (Japan) Satoko Suetsuna	17	21	21
4	(Bulgaria) Petya Nedelcheva (Russia) Anastasia Russkikh	17	11
8	(South Korea) Ha Jung-eun (South Korea) Lee Kyung-won	21	21
6	(China) Du Jing (China) Pan Pan	19	21	18
3	(Chinese Taipei) Cheng Wen-hsing (Chinese Taipei) Chien Yu-chin	21	17	21
7	(China) Tian Qing (China) Yu Yang	21	21
2	(Japan) Mizuki Fujii (Japan) Reika Kakiiwa	9	11

Semifinals
5	(Japan) Miyuki Maeda (Japan) Satoko Suetsuna	13	21	22
8	(South Korea) Ha Jung-eun (South Korea) Lee Kyung-won	21	19	20
6	(Chinese Taipei) Cheng Wen-hsing (Chinese Taipei) Chien Yu-chin	12	15
7	(China) Tian Qing (China) Yu Yang	21	21

Finals
5	(Japan) Miyuki Maeda (Japan) Satoko Suetsuna	16	13
7	(China) Tian Qing (China) Yu Yang	21	21

== Mixed doubles ==
=== Seeds ===
1. (China) Zheng Bo / Ma Jin
2. (South Korea) Lee Yong-dae / Lee Hyo-jung
3. (Denmark) Thomas Laybourn / Kamilla Rytter Juhl
4. (Denmark) Joachim Fischer Nielsen / Christinna Pedersen
5. (China) Tao Jiaming / Zhang Yawen
6. (India) Diju V. / Jwala Gutta
7. (Poland) Robert Mateusiak / Nadieżda Kostiuczyk
8. (South Korea) Ko Sung-hyun / Ha Jung-eun

=== Results ===
Quarterfinals
(Chinese Taipei) Chen Hung-ling (Chinese Taipei) Cheng Wen-hsing	9	21	17
(South Korea) Shin Baek-cheol (South Korea) Yoo Hyun-young	21	13	21
3	(Denmark) Thomas Laybourn (Denmark) Kamilla Rytter Juhl	22	21
(China) Zhang Nan (China) Tian Qing	20	19
7	(Poland) Robert Mateusiak (Poland) Nadieżda Kostiuczyk	21	11	21
(South Korea) Yoo Yeon-seong (South Korea) Kim Min-jung	16	21	18
5	(China) Tao Jiaming (China) Zhang Yawen	11	16
2	(South Korea) Lee Yong-dae (South Korea) Lee Hyo-jung	21	21

Semifinals
(South Korea) Shin Baek-cheol (South Korea) Yoo Hyun-young	12	21	24
3	(Denmark) Thomas Laybourn (Denmark) Kamilla Rytter Juhl	21	15	22
7	(Poland) Robert Mateusiak (Poland) Nadieżda Kostiuczyk
2	(South Korea) Lee Yong-dae (South Korea) Lee Hyo-jung	w/o

Finals
(South Korea) Shin Baek-cheol (South Korea) Yoo Hyun-young	14	18
2	(South Korea) Lee Yong-dae (South Korea) Lee Hyo-jung	21	21

Preceded by 2009 Swiss Open Super Series	Swiss Open Super Series	Succeeded by 2011 Swiss Open Super Series
Preceded by 2010 All-England Super Series	BWF Super Series	Succeeded by 2010 Singapore Super Series
