= 2010 BWF World Championships – Women's singles =

Badminton championships

Women's singles at the 2010 BWF World Championships
- Venue: Stade Pierre de Coubertin
- Location: Paris, France
- Dates: August 23, 2010 – August 29, 2010

Medalists
gold medal	Wang Lin	China
silver medal	Wang Xin	China
bronze medal	Tine Baun	Denmark
bronze medal	Wang Shixian	China

The 2010 BWF World Championships was the 18th tournament of the World Badminton Championships. It was held at Stade Pierre de Coubertin in Paris, France, from August 23 to August 29, 2010. Following the results of the women's singles.

== Seeds ==
1. (China) Wang Yihan (third round)
2. (India) Saina Nehwal (quarterfinals)
3. (China) Wang Xin (finalist)
4. (Denmark) Tine Baun (semifinals)
5. (France) Pi Hongyan (quarterfinals)
6. (China) Wang Shixian (semifinals)
7. (China) Wang Lin (champion)
8. (Germany) Juliane Schenk (third round)
9. (Hong Kong) Zhou Mi (first round, retired)
10. (Japan) Eriko Hirose (quarterfinals)
11. (Netherlands) Yao Jie (third round)
12. (Hong Kong) Yip Pui Yin (third round)
13. (Russia) Ella Diehl (third round)
14. (South Korea) Bae Seung-hee (second round)
15. (Bulgaria) Petya Nedelcheva (third round)
16. (South Korea) Kim Moon-hi (third round)

== Main stage ==
=== Section 1 ===
First round
10	(Japan) E Hirose	21	21
(India) A Mutatkar	12	16
(Indonesia) MF Kusumastuti	21	23
(Russia) T Bibik	11	21
12	(Hong Kong) Yip PY	21	21
(France) P Le Buhanic	18	11
(Republic of Ireland) C Magee	18	13
(Canada) A Rice	21	21

Second round
1	(China) Wang YH	21	21
(Thailand) P Buranaprasertsuk	12	19
10	(Japan) E Hirose	21	21
(Indonesia) MF Kusumastuti	14	18
7	(China) Wang L	21	21
(Slovenia) M Tvrdy	7	18
12	(Hong Kong) Yip PY	21	21
(Canada) A Rice	19	13

Third round
1	(China) Wang YH	22	16	18
10	(Japan) E Hirose	20	21	21
7	(China) Wang L	21	21
12	(Hong Kong) Yip PY	13	17

Quarterfinals
10	(Japan) E Hirose	16	17
7	(China) Wang L	21	21

=== Section 2 ===
First round
15	(Bulgaria) P Nedelcheva	14	21	21
(Netherlands) J Meulendijks	21	16	10
(Mauritius) K Foo Kune	10	5
(Ukraine) L Griga	21	21
14	(South Korea) Bae S-h	21	21
(Scotland) S Egelstaff	15	16
(Finland) A Nieminen	18	11
(Chinese Taipei) Cheng S-c	21	21

Second round
4	(Denmark) T Baun	21	21
(Belgium) L Tan	10	11
15	(Bulgaria) P Nedelcheva	21	21
(Ukraine) L Griga	17	13
8	(Germany) J Schenk	21	21
(Malaysia) L Cheah	16	17
14	(South Korea) Bae S-h	14	23	16
(Chinese Taipei) Cheng S-c	21	21	21

Third round
4	(Denmark) T Baun	21	23
15	(Bulgaria) P Nedelcheva	19	21
8	(Germany) J Schenk	21	13	19
(Chinese Taipei) Cheng S-c	19	21	21

Quarterfinals
4	(Denmark) T Baun	21	21
(Chinese Taipei) Cheng S-c	18	13

=== Section 3 ===
First round
(New Zealand) M Chan	11	16
(Indonesia) A Firdasari	21	21
(Portugal) T Santos	11	15
16	(South Korea) Kim M-h	21	21
(Japan) A Goto	21	21
(Belarus) A Zaitsava	9	9
(Bulgaria) L Zetchiri
9	(Hong Kong) Zhou M	wo

Second round
(Indonesia) A Firdasari	21	15	18
16	(South Korea) Kim M-h	13	21	21
(Ukraine) E Prus	8	8
5	(France) Pi HY	21	21
(Japan) A Goto	21	21
(Bulgaria) L Zetchiri	8	10
(Canada) C Reid	15	10
3	(China) Wang X	21	21

Third round
16	(South Korea) Kim M-h	21	15	14
5	(France) Pi HY	16	21	21
(Japan) A Goto	13	13
3	(China) Wang X	21	21

Quarterfinals
5	(France) Pi HY	13	15
3	(China) Wang X	21	21

=== Section 4 ===
First round
(Czech Republic) K Ludíková	21	21
(United States) R Wang	18	9
(Singapore) Xing AY	17	21	8
11	(Netherlands) Yao J	21	9	21
(Germany) K Schnaase	16	14
(Malaysia) Wong MC	21	21
(Switzerland) J Cicognini	15	15
13	(Russia) E Diehl	21	21

Second round
(Czech Republic) K Ludíková	13	21	15
11	(Netherlands) Yao J	21	16	21
(Thailand) S Ponsana	15	7
6	(China) Wang SX	21	21
(Malaysia) Wong MC	21	15	12
13	(Russia) E Diehl	11	21	21
(Chinese Taipei) Chen H-h	22	15	8
2	(India) S Nehwal	20	21	21

Third round
11	(Netherlands) Yao J	13	5
6	(China) Wang SX	21	21
13	(Russia) E Diehl	14	18
2	(India) S Nehwal	21	21

Quarterfinals
6	(China) Wang SX	21	21
2	(India) S Nehwal	8	14

== Final stage ==
Quarterfinals
10	(Japan) Eriko Hirose	16	17
7	(China) Wang Lin	21	21
4	(Denmark) Tine Baun	21	21
(Chinese Taipei) Cheng Shao-chieh	18	13
5	(France) Pi Hongyan	13	15
3	(China) Wang Xin	21	21
6	(China) Wang Shixian	21	21
2	(India) Saina Nehwal	8	14

Semifinals
7	(China) Wang Lin	21	21
4	(Denmark) Tine Baun	11	8
3	(China) Wang Xin	21	11	21
6	(China) Wang Shixian	19	21	16

Finals
7	(China) Wang Lin	21	19	21
3	(China) Wang Xin	11	21	13
