= Badminton at the 2010 Asian Games =

- Venue: Tianhe Gymnasium
- Dates: 13–21 November
- Competitors: 190 from 17 nations

Badminton at the 2010 Asian Games was held in Tianhe Gymnasium, Guangzhou, China from 13 November to 21 November 2010.

Singles, doubles, and team events were contested for both men and women. Mixed Doubles were also contested.

== Schedule ==
| P | Preliminary rounds | ¼ | Quarterfinals | ½ | Semifinals | F | Final |

| Event↓/Date → | 13th Sat | | 14th Sun | 15th Mon | 16th Tue | 17th Wed | 18th Thu | 19th Fri | 20th Sat | 21st Sun |
|---|---|---|---|---|---|---|---|---|---|---|
| Men's singles | | | | | | P | P | ¼ | ½ | F |
| Men's doubles | | | | | P | P | ¼ | ½ | F | |
| Men's team | P | ¼ | ½ | F | | | | | | |
| Women's singles | | | | | P | P | ¼ | ½ | F | |
| Women's doubles | | | | | P | ¼ | ½ | F | | |
| Women's team | P | ¼ | ½ | F | | | | | | |
| Mixed doubles | | | | | | P | P | ¼ | ½ | F |

== Medalists ==
| Event | Gold | Silver | Bronze |
|---|---|---|---|
| Men's singles | Lin Dan; China | Lee Chong Wei; Malaysia | Chen Jin; China |
| Men's singles | Lin Dan; China | Lee Chong Wei; Malaysia | Park Sung-hwan; South Korea |
| Men's doubles | Indonesia; Markis Kido; Hendra Setiawan | Malaysia; Koo Kien Keat; Tan Boon Heong | Indonesia; Mohammad Ahsan; Alvent Yulianto |
| Men's doubles | Indonesia; Markis Kido; Hendra Setiawan | Malaysia; Koo Kien Keat; Tan Boon Heong | South Korea; Jung Jae-sung; Lee Yong-dae |
| Men's team | China; Bao Chunlai; Cai Yun; Chen Jin; Chen Long; Fu Haifeng; Guo Zhendong; He Hanbin; Lin Dan; Xu Chen; Zhang Nan | South Korea; Hong Ji-hoon; Jung Jae-sung; Kim Gi-jung; Ko Sung-hyun; Lee Hyun-il; Lee Yong-dae; Park Sung-hwan; Shin Baek-cheol; Son Wan-ho; Yoo Yeon-seong | Indonesia; Tontowi Ahmad; Mohammad Ahsan; Taufik Hidayat; Markis Kido; Sony Dwi Kuncoro; Fran Kurniawan; Dionysius Hayom Rumbaka; Simon Santoso; Hendra Setiawan; Alvent Yulianto |
| Men's team | China; Bao Chunlai; Cai Yun; Chen Jin; Chen Long; Fu Haifeng; Guo Zhendong; He Hanbin; Lin Dan; Xu Chen; Zhang Nan | South Korea; Hong Ji-hoon; Jung Jae-sung; Kim Gi-jung; Ko Sung-hyun; Lee Hyun-il; Lee Yong-dae; Park Sung-hwan; Shin Baek-cheol; Son Wan-ho; Yoo Yeon-seong | Thailand; Songphon Anugritayawon; Suppanyu Avihingsanon; Pollawat Boonpan; Bodin Isara; Maneepong Jongjit; Thitipong Lapho; Boonsak Ponsana; Sudket Prapakamol; Tanongsak Saensomboonsuk; Pakkawat Vilailak |
| Women's singles | Wang Shixian; China | Wang Xin; China | Eriko Hirose; Japan |
| Women's singles | Wang Shixian; China | Wang Xin; China | Yip Pui Yin; Hong Kong |
| Women's doubles | China; Tian Qing; Zhao Yunlei | China; Wang Xiaoli; Yu Yang | South Korea; Ha Jung-eun; Lee Kyung-won |
| Women's doubles | China; Tian Qing; Zhao Yunlei | China; Wang Xiaoli; Yu Yang | South Korea; Kim Min-jung; Lee Hyo-jung |
| Women's team | China; Cheng Shu; Jiang Yanjiao; Lu Lan; Ma Jin; Tian Qing; Wang Shixian; Wang Xiaoli; Wang Xin; Yu Yang; Zhao Yunlei | Thailand; Savitree Amitrapai; Duanganong Aroonkesorn; Porntip Buranaprasertsuk; Ratchanok Intanon; Nitchaon Jindapol; Punyada Munkitchokecharoen; Salakjit Ponsana; Sapsiree Taerattanachai; Saralee Thungthongkam; Kunchala Voravichitchaikul | South Korea; Bae Seung-hee; Bae Yeon-ju; Chang Ye-na; Ha Jung-eun; Hwang Hye-youn; Kim Min-jung; Lee Hyo-jung; Lee Kyung-won; Sung Ji-hyun; Yoo Hyun-young |
| Women's team | China; Cheng Shu; Jiang Yanjiao; Lu Lan; Ma Jin; Tian Qing; Wang Shixian; Wang Xiaoli; Wang Xin; Yu Yang; Zhao Yunlei | Thailand; Savitree Amitrapai; Duanganong Aroonkesorn; Porntip Buranaprasertsuk; Ratchanok Intanon; Nitchaon Jindapol; Punyada Munkitchokecharoen; Salakjit Ponsana; Sapsiree Taerattanachai; Saralee Thungthongkam; Kunchala Voravichitchaikul | Indonesia; Pia Zebadiah Bernadet; Lindaweni Fanetri; Adriyanti Firdasari; Shendy Puspa Irawati; Meiliana Jauhari; Maria Febe Kusumastuti; Nitya Krishinda Maheswari; Liliyana Natsir; Greysia Polii; Aprilia Yuswandari |
| Mixed doubles | South Korea; Shin Baek-cheol; Lee Hyo-jung | China; Zhang Nan; Zhao Yunlei | Chinese Taipei; Chen Hung-ling; Cheng Wen-hsing |
| Mixed doubles | South Korea; Shin Baek-cheol; Lee Hyo-jung | China; Zhang Nan; Zhao Yunlei | China; He Hanbin; Ma Jin |

== Medal table ==
| Rank | Nation | Gold | Silver | Bronze | Total |
|---|---|---|---|---|---|
| 1 | China (CHN) | 5 | 3 | 2 | 10 |
| 2 | South Korea (KOR) | 1 | 1 | 5 | 7 |
| 3 | Indonesia (INA) | 1 | 0 | 3 | 4 |
| 4 | Malaysia (MAS) | 0 | 2 | 0 | 2 |
| 5 | Thailand (THA) | 0 | 1 | 1 | 2 |
| 6 | Chinese Taipei (TPE) | 0 | 0 | 1 | 1 |
| 6 | Hong Kong (HKG) | 0 | 0 | 1 | 1 |
| 6 | Japan (JPN) | 0 | 0 | 1 | 1 |
| Totals (8 entries) | | 7 | 7 | 14 | 28 |

== Participating nations ==
A total of 190 athletes from 17 nations competed in badminton at the 2010 Asian Games:

- China (20)
- Chinese Taipei (20)
- Hong Kong (12)
- India (17)
- Indonesia (20)
- Iraq (1)
- Japan (16)
- Macau (6)
- Malaysia (18)
- Maldives (3)
- Mongolia (4)
- Nepal (5)
- Singapore (2)
- South Korea (20)
- Sri Lanka (4)
- Thailand (20)
- Vietnam (2)
