= Badminton at the 2010 Asian Games – Women's singles =

2010 Asian Games Badminton event

Women's singles at the 2010 Asian Games
- Venue: Tianhe Gymnasium
- Dates: 16–20 November
- Competitors: 25 from 13 nations

Medalists
gold medal	Wang Shixian	China
silver medal	Wang Xin	China
bronze medal	Eriko Hirose	Japan
bronze medal	Yip Pui Yin	Hong Kong

The badminton women's singles tournament at the 2010 Asian Games in Guangzhou took place 16–20 November 2010 at Tianhe Gymnasium.

== Schedule ==
All times are China Standard Time (UTC+08:00)

Date	Time	Event
Tuesday, 16 November 2010	09:00	Round of 32
Wednesday, 17 November 2010	19:00	Round of 16
Thursday, 18 November 2010	12:00	Quarterfinals
Friday, 19 November 2010	10:30	Semifinals
Saturday, 20 November 2010	14:30	Final

== Results ==
=== Final ===
Final
1	Wang Xin (CHN)	18	15
3	Wang Shixian (CHN)	21	21

=== Top half ===
Round of 32
Long Ying (MAC)	20	14
Hung Shih-han (TPE)	22	21
Sara Devi Tamang (NEP)	12	5
Chan Tsz Ka (HKG)	21	21
Aditi Mutatkar (IND)	21	21
Thilini Jayasinghe (SRI)	11	19
Salakjit Ponsana (THA)	18	21	15
Adriyanti Firdasari (INA)	21	16	21

Round of 16
1	Wang Xin (CHN)	21	21
Hung Shih-han (TPE)	8	14
5	Bae Yeon-ju (KOR)	21	21
Chan Tsz Ka (HKG)	14	14
4	Eriko Hirose (JPN)	20	21	21
Aditi Mutatkar (IND)	22	8	12
8	Wong Mew Choo (MAS)	21	21
Adriyanti Firdasari (INA)	19	18

Quarterfinals
1	Wang Xin (CHN)	21	22
5	Bae Yeon-ju (KOR)	17	20
4	Eriko Hirose (JPN)	22	21
8	Wong Mew Choo (MAS)	20	11

Semifinals
1	Wang Xin (CHN)	21	21
4	Eriko Hirose (JPN)	7	15

=== Bottom half ===
Round of 32
Ai Goto (JPN)	21	21
Subodha Dahanayake (SRI)	8	12
Mak Ka Lei (MAC)	10	6
7	Sung Ji-hyun (KOR)	21	21
Porntip Buranaprasertsuk (THA)	21	21
Sujana Shrestha (NEP)	4	4
Pai Hsiao-ma (TPE)	21	21
Maria Febe Kusumastuti (INA)	16	11
Lydia Cheah (MAS)	21	18	21
Vũ Thị Trang (VIE)	13	21	7

Round of 16
Ai Goto (JPN)	21	21
7	Sung Ji-hyun (KOR)	19	13
Porntip Buranaprasertsuk (THA)	21	9	12
3	Wang Shixian (CHN)	19	21	21
Pai Hsiao-ma (TPE)	17	12
6	Yip Pui Yin (HKG)	21	21
Lydia Cheah (MAS)	15	17
2	Saina Nehwal (IND)	21	21

Quarterfinals
Ai Goto (JPN)	5	13
3	Wang Shixian (CHN)	21	21
6	Yip Pui Yin (HKG)	21	8	21
2	Saina Nehwal (IND)	8	21	19

Semifinals
3	Wang Shixian (CHN)	21	21
6	Yip Pui Yin (HKG)	14	14
