= Badminton at the 2010 Asian Games – Women's team =

Women's team at the 2010 Asian Games
- Venue: Tianhe Gymnasium
- Dates: 13–15 November
- Competitors: 86 from 10 nations

Medalists
gold medal	China; Cheng Shu, Jiang Yanjiao, Lu Lan, Ma Jin, Tian Qing, Wang Shixian, Wang Xiaoli, Wang Xin, Yu Yang, Zhao Yunlei
silver medal	Thailand; Savitree Amitrapai, Duanganong Aroonkesorn, Porntip Buranaprasertsuk, Ratchanok Intanon, Nitchaon Jindapol, Punyada Munkitchokecharoen, Salakjit Ponsana, Sapsiree Taerattanachai, Saralee Thungthongkam, Kunchala Voravichitchaikul
bronze medal	South Korea; Bae Seung-hee, Bae Yeon-ju, Chang Ye-na, Ha Jung-eun, Hwang Hye-youn, Kim Min-jung, Lee Hyo-jung, Lee Kyung-won, Sung Ji-hyun, Yoo Hyun-young
bronze medal	Indonesia; Pia Zebadiah Bernadet, Lindaweni Fanetri, Adriyanti Firdasari, Shendy Puspa Irawati, Meiliana Jauhari, Maria Febe Kusumastuti, Nitya Krishinda Maheswari, Liliyana Natsir, Greysia Polii, Aprilia Yuswandari

The badminton women's team tournament at the 2010 Asian Games in Guangzhou took place from 13 November to 15 November at Tianhe Gymnasium.

Ten teams entered for the tournament but Macau didn't show up against China women's team in quarterfinal round and therefore lost by walkover.

China won the gold medal by beating Thailand 3–0 in the final at Tianhe Gymnasium on 15 November 2010. It was the fourth consecutive Asian Games gold for China's women in the event. World number one Wang Xin lost the first game to Ratchanok Intanon but rallied to take the opener 20–22 21–17 21–14. In the next bout, Wang Shixian beat Nitchaon Jindapol 21–13, 21–12, to make the team result 2–0. There was no such drama in last matches when world number six Jiang Yanjiao beat Sapsiree Taerattanachai 21–15, 21–10.

South Korea and Indonesia shared the bronze medal. South Korea lost 3–0 to China in the semifinal while Indonesia outplayed by Thailand 3–1.

== Schedule ==
All times are China Standard Time (UTC+08:00)

Date	Time	Event
Saturday, 13 November 2010	09:00	Round of 16
Saturday, 13 November 2010	13:00	Quarterfinals
Sunday, 14 November 2010	12:00	Semifinals
Monday, 15 November 2010	12:00	Final

== Results ==
Legend

- WO — Won by walkover

1st round
Hong Kong	1
Malaysia	3
Indonesia	3
India	2

Quarterfinals
1	China	WO
Macau
3	South Korea	3
Malaysia	0
Indonesia	3
4	Chinese Taipei	0
Thailand	3
2	Japan	1

Semifinals
1	China	3
3	South Korea	0
Indonesia	1
Thailand	3

Final
1	China	3
Thailand	0

=== Round of 16 ===
13 November	Hong Kong	1–3	Malaysia

Yip Pui Yin	1–2	Wong Mew Choo	22–20, 18–21, 18–21
Chan Tsz Ka	2–1	Lydia Cheah	10–21, 21–17, 21–19
Tse Ying Suet	1–2	Tee Jing Yi	21–19, 6–21, 13–21
Chau Hoi Wah / Chan Tsz Ka	1–2	Vivian Hoo / Lim Yin Loo	21–17, 18–21, 18–21

13 November	Indonesia	3–2	India

Adriyanti Firdasari	0–2	Saina Nehwal	16–21, 17–21
Greysia Polii / Meiliana Jauhari	1–2	Jwala Gutta / Ashwini Ponnappa	17–21, 21–17, 21–23
Maria Febe Kusumastuti	2–0	Aditi Mutatkar	21–10, 21–16
Liliyana Natsir / Nitya Krishinda Maheswari	2–0	Aparna Balan / Prajakta Sawant	21–11, 21–11
Lindaweni Fanetri	2–0	Arundhati Pantawane	21–9, 21–10

=== Quarterfinals ===
13 November	China	3–0	Macau

—	2–0	—	Walkover
—	2–0	—	Walkover
—	2–0	—	Walkover

13 November	South Korea	3–0	Malaysia

Bae Yeon-ju	2–1	Wong Mew Choo	21–17, 16–21, 21–14
Ha Jung-eun / Lee Kyung-won	2–0	Vivian Hoo / Lim Yin Loo	21–13, 21–8
Sung Ji-hyun	2–0	Lydia Cheah	21–14, 21–15

13 November	Indonesia	3–0	Chinese Taipei

Adriyanti Firdasari	2–1	Cheng Shao-chieh	14–21, 21–11, 21–11
Greysia Polii / Meiliana Jauhari	2–1	Cheng Wen-hsing / Chien Yu-chin	21–16, 16–21, 21–12
Maria Febe Kusumastuti	2–0	Chen Hsiao-huan	21–19, 21–10

13 November	Thailand	3–1	Japan

Salakjit Ponsana	2–0	Eriko Hirose	21–7, 21–18
Duanganong Aroonkesorn / Savitree Amitrapai	0–2	Miyuki Maeda / Satoko Suetsuna	11–21, 10–21
Porntip Buranaprasertsuk	2–1	Ai Goto	21–19, 16–21, 21–10
Saralee Thungthongkam / Kunchala Voravichitchaikul	2–0	Mizuki Fujii / Reika Kakiiwa	21–14, 21–18

=== Semifinals ===
14 November	China	3–0	South Korea

Wang Xin	2–0	Bae Yeon-ju	21–17, 21–12
Wang Xiaoli / Yu Yang	2–0	Lee Kyung-won / Ha Jung-eun	21–12, 21–19
Wang Shixian	2–1	Bae Seung-hee	21–18, 18–21, 21–14

14 November	Indonesia	1–3	Thailand

Adriyanti Firdasari	1–2	Salakjit Ponsana	17–21, 21–17, 17–21
Greysia Polii / Meiliana Jauhari	2–1	Punyada Munkitchokecharoen / Savitree Amitrapai	18–21, 21–15, 21–10
Maria Febe Kusumastuti	0–2	Porntip Buranaprasertsuk	12–21, 15–21
Nitya Krishinda Maheswari / Pia Zebadiah Bernadet	1–2	Saralee Thungthongkam / Kunchala Voravichitchaikul	21–9, 17–21, 11–21

=== Final ===
15 November	China	3–0	Thailand

Wang Xin	2–1	Ratchanok Intanon	20–22, 21–17, 21–14
Wang Shixian	2–0	Nitchaon Jindapol	21–13, 21–12
Jiang Yanjiao	2–0	Sapsiree Taerattanachai	21–15, 21–10

== Non-participating athletes ==
- Cheng Shu (CHN)
- Lu Lan (CHN)
- Ma Jin (CHN)
- Tian Qing (CHN)
- Zhao Yunlei (CHN)
- Mong Kwan Yi (HKG)
- Poon Lok Yan (HKG)
- Shendy Puspa Irawati (INA)
- Aprilia Yuswandari (INA)
- Trupti Murgunde (IND)
- Sayaka Sato (JPN)
- Reiko Shiota (JPN)
- Chang Ye-na (KOR)
- Hwang Hye-youn (KOR)
- Kim Min-jung (KOR)
- Lee Hyo-jung (KOR)
- Yoo Hyun-young (KOR)
- Long Ying (MAC)
- Mak Ka Lei (MAC)
- Wang Rong (MAC)
- Zhang Dan (MAC)
- Zhang Zhibo (MAC)
- Goh Liu Ying (MAS)
- Marylen Ng (MAS)
- Sannatasah Saniru (MAS)
- Woon Khe Wei (MAS)
- Hsieh Pei-chen (TPE)
- Hung Shih-chieh (TPE)
- Hung Shih-han (TPE)
- Pai Hsiao-ma (TPE)
- Wang Pei-rong (TPE)
- Yang Chia-chen (TPE)
