= 2010 China Open =

2010 China Open can refer to:

- 2010 China Open (snooker), a snooker tournament
- 2010 China Open (tennis), a tennis tournament
- 2010 China Open Super Series, an edition of the China Open badminton tournament
