= 2010 China Open Super Series =

2010 China Open
Tournament details
- Dates: 30 November–5 December 2010
- Edition: 22nd
- Level: Super Series
- Total prize money: US$250,000
- Venue: Yuanshen Gymnasium
- Location: Shanghai, China

Champions
- Men's singles: (China) Chen Long
- Women's singles: (China) Jiang Yanjiao
- Men's doubles: (South Korea) Jung Jae-sung (South Korea) Lee Yong-dae
- Women's doubles: (China) Cheng Shu (China) Zhao Yunlei
- Mixed doubles: (China) Tao Jiaming (China) Tian Qing

The 2010 China Open Super Series was a top level badminton competition which was held from 30 November–5 December 2010 at the Yuanshen Gymnasium in Shanghai, China. It was the eleventh BWF Super Series competition on the 2010 BWF Super Series schedule. The total purse for the event was $250,000.

== Men's singles ==
1. (Denmark) Peter Gade (withdrew)
2. (China) Lin Dan (quarterfinals)
3. (China) Chen Jin (semifinals)
4. (Thailand) Boonsak Ponsana (first round)
5. (China) Chen Long (champion)
6. (Vietnam) Nguyen Tien Minh (second round)
7. (Denmark) Jan Ø. Jørgensen (quarterfinals)
8. (China) Bao Chunlai (final)

=== Top half ===
First Round
PFQ	(South Korea) Lee H-i	14	21	21
(India) R.M.V. Gurusaidutt	21	17	8
Q3	(China) Lü Y	23	21
(India) A Bhat	21	6
8	(China) Bao CL
(Lithuania) K Navickas	w/o
(Thailand) T Saensomboonsuk	23	22	7
Q4	(China) Qiao B	21	24	21
4	(Thailand) B Ponsana	21	12	16
(China) Du PY	17	21	21
(Sweden) H Hurskainen	19	10
(Hong Kong) Hu Y	21	21
7	(Denmark) J Ø Jørgensen	21	9	21
PFQ	(China) Wen K	9	21	17
(Scotland) A Casey	9	9
(Hong Kong) Chan Y K	21	21

Second Round
PFQ	(South Korea) Lee H-i	14	7
Q3	(China) Lü Y	21	21
8	(China) Bao CL	21	21
Q4	(China) Qiao B	11	15
(China) Du PY	21	21
(Hong Kong) Hu Y	17	12
7	(Denmark) J Ø Jørgensen	21	19	21
(Hong Kong) Chan Y K	15	21	16

Quarterfinals
Q3	(China) Lü Y	11	15
8	(China) Bao CL	21	21
(China) Du PY
(Denmark) J Ø Jørgensen	w/o

Semifinals
8	(China) Bao CL	22	21
(China) Du PY	20	16

=== Bottom half ===
First Round
Q1	(China) Sheng Z	21	21
(Germany) M Zwiebler	15	9
(France) B Leverdez	13	18
6	(Vietnam) Nguyen T M	21	21
(Chinese Taipei) Hsieh Y-h	18	21	21
(Denmark) C Lind Thomsen	21	3	15
(Malaysia) Chong W F	11	11
3	(China) Chen J	21	21
PFQ	(China) Wang ZM	5	21	17
(South Korea) Park S-h	21	11	21
(Chinese Taipei) Chen C-t	17	9
5	(China) Chen L	21	21
(South Korea) Shon W-h	11	21	21
(Chinese Taipei) Hsueh H-y	21	15	15
Q2	(China) Zhou WL	17	16
2	(China) Lin D	21	21

Second Round
Q1	(China) Sheng Z	13	21	21
6	(Vietnam) Nguyen T M	21	12	17
(Chinese Taipei) Hsieh Y-h	8	21	16
3	(China) Chen J	21	18	21
(South Korea) Park S-h	12	16
5	(China) Chen L	21	21
(South Korea) Shon W-h	9	12
2	(China) Lin D	21	21

Quarterfinals
Q1	(China) Sheng Z	8	13
3	(China) Chen J	21	21
5	(China) Chen L	w/o
2	(China) Lin D

Semifinals
3	(China) Chen J	20	21	18
5	(China) Chen L	22	18	21

=== Finals ===
Semifinals
8	(China) Bao Chunlai	22	21
(China) Du Pengyu	20	16
3	(China) Chen Jin	20	21	18
5	(China) Chen Long	22	18	21

Final
8	(China) Bao Chunlai	21	14	16
5	(China) Chen Long	9	21	21

== Women's singles ==
1. (China) Wang Xin (semifinals)
2. (China) Wang Yihan (semifinals)
3. (China) Wang Shixian (final)
4. (China) Jiang Yanjiao (champion)
5. (France) Pi Hongyan (withdrew)
6. (Germany) Juliane Schenk (second round)
7. (South Korea) Bae Youn-joo (quarterfinals)
8. (Russia) Ella Diehl (first round)

=== Top half ===
First Round
1	(China) Wang X	21	21
(Singapore) Gu J	10	10
(Singapore) Xing AY	22	21
(Hong Kong) Chan T K	20	17
6	(Germany) J Schenk	21	16	21
(South Korea) Bae S-h	19	21	12
Q1	(China) Zhou H	21	21
(Bulgaria) P Nedelcheva	9	9
3	(China) Wang SX	21	22
(Hong Kong) Yip P Y	13	20
(China) Li XR	21	21
(Singapore) Fu MT	17	11
7	(South Korea) Bae Y-j	21	21
(Thailand) P Burnaprasertsuk	16	17
(Chinese Taipei) Cheng S-c	21	21
(United States) R Wang	12	11

Second Round
1	(China) Wang X	23	21
(Singapore) Xing AY	21	13
6	(Germany) J Schenk	18	21	12
Q1	(China) Zhou H	21	11	21
3	(China) Wang SX	21	21
(China) Li XR	19	18
7	(South Korea) Bae Y-j	21	21
(Chinese Taipei) Cheng S-c	15	6

Quarterfinals
1	(China) Wang X	21	21
Q1	(China) Zhou H	14	14
3	(China) Wang SX	21	21
7	(South Korea) Bae Y-j	9	15

Semifinals
1	(China) Wang X	18	16
3	(China) Wang SX	21	21

=== Bottom half ===
First Round
(Thailand) R Inthanon	21	21
(Singapore) Chen JY	13	8
(China) Lu L	21	21
8	(Russia) E Diehl	16	10
(Thailand) S Ponsana	21	21	17
(Netherlands) Yao J	11	23	21
(Chinese Taipei) Tai T-y	12	21	15
4	(China) Jiang YJ	21	12	21
Q	(China) Xia JY	21	16	21
Q	(China) Liu X	10	21	13
(South Korea) Sung J-h
PFQ	(Singapore) Zhang BW	w/o
(Canada) M Li	21	9	14
Q	(China) Chen XJ	14	21	21
(Chinese Taipei) Chen H-h	11	12
2	(China) Wang YH	21	21

Second Round
(Thailand) R Inthanon	23	15	21
(China) Lu L	21	21	19
(Netherlands) Yao J	10	12
4	(China) Jiang YJ	21	21
Q	(China) Xia JY	16	21	21
PFQ	(Singapore) Zhang BW	21	8	16
Q	(China) Chen XJ	11	17
2	(China) Wang YH	21	21

Quarterfinals
(Thailand) R Inthanon	10	21	18
4	(China) Jiang YJ	21	19	21
Q	(China) Xia JY	21	6	16
2	(China) Wang YH	12	21	21

Semifinals
4	(China) Jiang YJ	21	21
2	(China) Wang YH	19	17

=== Finals ===
Semifinals
1	(China) Wang Xin	18	16
3	(China) Wang Shixian	21	21
4	(China) Jiang Yanjiao	21	21
2	(China) Wang Yihan	19	17

Final
3	(China) Wang Shixian	16	19
4	(China) Jiang Yanjiao	21	21

== Men's doubles ==
1. (Denmark) Mathias Boe / Carsten Mogensen (quarterfinals)
2. (Malaysia) Koo Kien Keat / Tan Boon Heong (quarterfinals)
3. (Indonesia) Markis Kido / Hendra Setiawan (withdrew)
4. (South Korea) Jung Jae-sung / Lee Yong-dae (champion)
5. (China) Cai Yun / Fu Haifeng (quarterfinals)
6. (Chinese Taipei) Fang Chieh-min / Lee Sheng-mu (semifinals)
7. (South Korea) Ko Sung-hyun / Yoo Yeon-seong (semifinals)
8. (China) Guo Zhendong / Xu Chen (quarterfinals)

=== Top half ===
First Round
(Thailand) S Anugritayawon (Thailand) S Prapakamol	11	21	21
(Chinese Taipei) Liao M-c (Chinese Taipei) Wu C-w	21	18	17
6	(Chinese Taipei) Fang C-m (Chinese Taipei) Lee S-m	21	21
PFQ	(Malaysia) M Z A Latif (Malaysia) Hoon T H	15	10
(Malaysia) Chan P S (Malaysia) Lim K W	21	21
Q	(China) Chen ZF (China) Mu HH	16	12
PFQ	(China) Chen ZB (China) Lei WL	14	13
(Chinese Taipei) Chen H-l (Chinese Taipei) Lin Y-l	21	21
(Japan) Y Hirobe (Japan) K Kazuno	24	21	16
(China) Chai B (China) Zhang N	26	19	21
8	(China) Guo ZD (China) Xu C	21	21
(Denmark) R Bonde (Denmark) A Kristiansen	16	19
PFQ	(China) Hong W (China) Shen Y	15	21	30
(China) Liu XL (China) Qiu ZH	21	19	28

Second Round
1	(Denmark) M Boe (Denmark) C Mogensen	21	21
(Thailand) S Anugritayawon (Thailand) S Prapakamol	4	9
6	(Chinese Taipei) Fang C-m (Chinese Taipei) Lee S-m	21	21
(Malaysia) Chan P S (Malaysia) Lim K W	16	15
(Chinese Taipei) Chen H-l (Chinese Taipei) Lin Y-l	17	16
(China) Chai B (China) Zhang N	21	21
8	(China) Guo ZD (China) Xu C	21	21
PFQ	(China) Hong W (China) Shen Y	15	17

Quarterfinals
1	(Denmark) M Boe (Denmark) C Mogensen	11	18
6	(Chinese Taipei) Fang C-m (Chinese Taipei) Lee S-m	21	21
(China) Chai B (China) Zhang N	21	21
8	(China) Guo ZD (China) Xu C	15	16

Semifinals
6	(Chinese Taipei) Fang C-m (Chinese Taipei) Lee S-m	12	21	24
(China) Chai B (China) Zhang N	21	15	26

=== Bottom half ===
First Round
(England) R Blair (Indonesia) F Limpele	21	21
(Denmark) M Conrad-Petersen (Denmark) J Rasmussen	12	15
(United States) H Bach (United States) T Gunawan	12	19
5	(China) Cai Y (China) Fu HF	21	21
(Malaysia) Goh W S (Malaysia) Teo K S	21	21
(Netherlands) R Bosch (Netherlands) K Ridder	18	10
(Japan) H Endo (Japan) K Hayakawa	11	13
4	(South Korea) Jung J-s (South Korea) Lee Y-d	21	21
Q	(China) Li JY (China) Liu C	16	15
(China) He HB (China) Tao JM	21	21
(China) Guo JJ (China) Liu PX	10	21	12
7	(South Korea) Ko S-h (South Korea) Yoo Y-s	21	18	21
(China) Lu K (China) Li G	21	21
(Scotland) A Casey (United States) M Fogarty	11	10
Q	(China) Pei TY (China) Wang TY	13	11
2	(Malaysia) Koo K K (Malaysia) Tan B H	21	21

Second Round
(England) R Blair (Indonesia) F Limpele	11	13
5	(China) Cai Y (China) Fu HF	21	21
(Malaysia) Goh W S (Malaysia) Teo K S	8	16
4	(South Korea) Jung J-s (South Korea) Lee Y-d	21	21
(China) He HB (China) Tao JM	19	15
7	(South Korea) Ko S-h (South Korea) Yoo Y-s	21	21
(China) Lu K (China) Li G	12	16
2	(Malaysia) Koo K K (Malaysia) Tan B H	21	21

Quarterfinals
5	(China) Cai Y (China) Fu HF	19	21	8
4	(South Korea) Jung J-s (South Korea) Lee Y-d	21	19	21
7	(South Korea) Ko S-h (South Korea) Yoo Y-s	21	18	21
2	(Malaysia) Koo K K (Malaysia) Tan B H	17	21	16

Semifinals
4	(South Korea) Jung J-s (South Korea) Lee Y-d	21	21
7	(South Korea) Ko S-h (South Korea) Yoo Y-s	10	15

=== Finals ===
Semifinals
6	(Chinese Taipei) Lee Sheng-mu (Chinese Taipei) Fang Chieh-min	12	21	24
(China) Chai Biao (China) Zhang Nan	21	15	26
4	(South Korea) Jung Jae-sung (South Korea) Lee Yong-dae	21	21
7	(South Korea) Ko Sung-hyun (South Korea) Yoo Yeon-seong	10	15

Final
(China) Chai Biao (China) Zhang Nan	15	12
4	(South Korea) Jung Jae-sung (South Korea) Lee Yong-dae	21	21

== Women's doubles ==
1. (Chinese Taipei) Cheng Wen-hsing / Chien Yu-chin (quarterfinals)
2. (China) Cheng Shu / Zhao Yunlei (champion)
3. (Russia) Valeria Sorokina / Nina Vislova (first round)
4. (Thailand) Duanganong Aroonkesorn / Kunchala Voravichitchaikul (quarterfinals)
5. (China) Pan Pan / Tian Qing (semifinals)
6. (South Korea) Kim Min-jung / Lee Hyo-jung (withdrew)
7. (Macau) Zhang Dan / Zhang Zhibo (second round)
8. (South Korea) Ha Jung-eun / Jung Kyung-eun (semifinals)

=== Top half ===
First Round
(Malaysia) Chin E H (Malaysia) Goh L Y	11
(China) Wang XL (China) Yu Y	8^{r}
7	(Macau) Zhang D (Macau) Zhang ZB	21	21
(China) Deng YT (China) Xie J	7	18
(China) Ma J (China) Zhong QX	21	21
(Sweden) E Lennartsson (Sweden) E Wengberg	10	10
4	(Thailand) D Aroonkesorn (Thailand) K Voravichitchaikul	21	21
(China) Qiao N (China) Qu QQ	9	11
8	(South Korea) Ha J-e (South Korea) Jung K-e	21	25
(China) Xia H (China) Tang JH	18	23

Second Round
1	(Chinese Taipei) Cheng W-h (Chinese Taipei) Chien Y-c	21	20	21
(Malaysia) Chin E H (Malaysia) Goh L Y	7	22	12
7	(Macau) Zhang D (Macau) Zhang ZB	8	14
(China) Ma J (China) Zhong QX	21	21
4	(Thailand) D Aroonkesorn (Thailand) K Voravichitchaikul	w/o
(Chinese Taipei) Hung S-c (Chinese Taipei) Yang C-c
8	(South Korea) Ha J-e (South Korea) Jung K-e	21	21
(Singapore) Chen JY (Singapore) Gu J	11	12

Quarterfinals
1	(Chinese Taipei) Cheng W-h (Chinese Taipei) Chien Y-c	16	19
(China) Ma J (China) Zhong QX	21	21
4	(Thailand) D Aroonkesorn (Thailand) K Voravichitchaikul	13	15
8	(South Korea) Ha J-e (South Korea) Jung K-e	21	21

Semifinals
(China) Ma J (China) Zhong QX	11	21	21
8	(South Korea) Ha J-e (South Korea) Jung K-e	21	8	18

=== Bottom half ===
First Round
(Singapore) Fu MT (Singapore) Zhang BW	19	8
(Chinese Taipei) Hsieh P-c (Chinese Taipei) Wang P-r	21	21
(Canada) A Bruce (Canada) M Li	7	10
5	(China) Pan P (China) Tian Q	21	21
(China) Lu L (China) Bao YX	19	21	18
(Japan) M Matsutomo (Japan) A Takahashi	21	17	21
(China) Luo Yi (China) Luo Yu	17	21	21
3	(Russia) V Sorokina (Russia) N Vislova	21	19	9
(United States) I Wang (United States) R Wang	18	12
(China) Xiao T (China) Xiong R	21	21
(United States) E Lee (United States) P L Obañana	11	11
(Hong Kong) Chan T K (Hong Kong) Chau H W	21	21

Second Round
(Chinese Taipei) Hsieh P-c (Chinese Taipei) Wang P-r	10	19
5	(China) Pan P (China) Tian Q	21	21
(Japan) M Matsutomo (Japan) A Takahashi	21	19	21
(China) Luo Yi (China) Luo Yu	13	21	17
(China) Xiao T (China) Xiong R	23	21
(China) Dong YR (China) Ou DN	21	15
(Hong Kong) Chan T K (Hong Kong) Chau H W	11	10
2	(China) Cheng S (China) Zhao YL	21	21

Quarterfinals
5	(China) Pan P (China) Tian Q	21	19	21
(Japan) M Matsutomo (Japan) A Takahashi	10	21	18
(China) Xiao T (China) Xiong R	6	10
2	(China) Cheng S (China) Zhao YL	21	21

Semifinals
5	(China) Pan P (China) Tiang Q	14	13
2	(China) Cheng S (China) Zhao YL	21	21

=== Finals ===
Semifinals
(China) Ma Jin (China) Zhong Qianxin	11	21	21
8	(South Korea) Ha Jung-eun (South Korea) Jung Kyung-eun	21	8	18
5	(China) Pan Pan (China) Tian Qing	14	13
2	(China) Cheng Shu (China) Zhao Yunlei	21	21

Final
(China) Ma Jin (China) Zhong Qianxin
2	(China) Cheng Shu (China) Zhao Yunlei	w/o

== Mixed doubles ==
1. (Denmark) Thomas Laybourn / Kamilla Rytter Juhl (withdrew)
2. (Poland) Robert Mateusiak / Nadieżda Zieba (second round)
3. (Thailand) Sudket Prapakamol / Saralee Thungthongkam (quarterfinals)
4. (Thailand) Songphon Anugritayawon / Kunchala Voravichitchaikul (quarterfinals)
5. (China) Zhang Nan / Zhao Yunlei (final)
6. (Denmark) Joachim Fischer Nielsen / Christinna Pedersen (withdrew)
7. (Chinese Taipei) Lee Sheng-mu / Chien Yu-chin (first round)
8. (South Korea) Ko Sung-hyun / Ha Jung-eun (quarterfinals)

=== Top half ===
First Round
PFQ	(China) Shen Y (China) Pan P	21	22
PFQ	(China) Li G (China) Xia H	14	20
Q4	(China) Xiong SA (China) Feng C	15	19
(China) Lu K (China) Luo Yu	21	21
5	(China) Zhang N (China) Zhao YL	21	21
(Japan) S Ikeda (Japan) R Shiota	12	10
Q3	(China) Liu Ch (China) Luo Yi	21	17	18
(Chinese Taipei) Chen H-l (Chinese Taipei) Cheng W-h	10	21	21
3	(Thailand) S Prapakamol (Thailand) S Thoungthongkam	21	21
(Chinese Taipei) Wong W H (Chinese Taipei) Chau H W	14	13
(Malaysia) Koo K K (Malaysia) Chin E H	21	21
(South Korea) Yoo Y-s (South Korea) Kim M-j	15	15
7	(Chinese Taipei) Lee S-m (Chinese Taipei) Chien Y-c	18	21	19
(Malaysia) Chan P S (Malaysia) Goh L Y	21	9	21
(Chinese Taipei) Liao M-c (Chinese Taipei) Chen H-h	10	22	21
Q2	(China) Liu PX (China) Tang JH	21	20	19

Second Round
PFQ	(China) Shen Y (China) Pan P	13	21	10
(China) Lu K (China) Luo Yu	21	18	21
5	(China) Zhang N (China) Zhao YL	17	21	21
(Chinese Taipei) Chen H-l (Chinese Taipei) Cheng W-h	21	17	13
3	(Thailand) S Prapakamol (Thailand) S Thoungthongkam	21	21
(Malaysia) Koo K K (Malaysia) Chin E H	19	10
(Malaysia) Chan P S (Malaysia) Goh L Y	21	21
(Chinese Taipei) Liao M-c (Chinese Taipei) Chen H-h	13	18

Quarterfinals
(China) Lu K (China) Luo Yu	14	12
5	(China) Zhang N (China) Zhao YL	21	21
3	(Thailand) S Prapakamol (Thailand) S Thoungthongkam	16	18
(Malaysia) Chan P S (Malaysia) Goh L Y	21	21

Semifinals
5	(China) Zhang N (China) Zhao YL	21	21
(Malaysia) Chan P S (Malaysia) Goh L Y	17	18

=== Bottom half ===
First Round
(China) Xu C (China) Yu Y	21	21
(Chinese Taipei) Fang C-m (Chinese Taipei) Wang P-r	9	13
(China) Tao JM (China) Tian Q	21	21
PFQ	(China) Li JY (China) Lu L	12	15
(Thailand) P Chalardchaleam (Thailand) S Amitrapai	21	21
(United States) H H Ho (United States) E Lee	18	17
Q1	(China) Mu H H (China) Qiao N	7	10
4	(Thailand) S Anugritayawon (Thailand) K Voravichitchaikul	21	21
(China) Qiu ZH (China) Zhong QX	19	20
(Japan) K Hayakawa (Japan) A Takahashi	21	22
PFQ	(China) Hong W (China) Bao YX	16	20
8	(South Korea) Ko S-h (South Korea) Ha J-e	21	22
(Malaysia) Ong J G (Malaysia) Chin C S	13	10
(China) He HB (China) Ma J	21	21
(South Korea) Kim K-j (South Korea) Jang Y-n	19	19
2	(Poland) R Mateusiak (Poland) N Zieba	21	21

Second Round
(China) Xu C (China) Yu Y	13	18
(China) Tao JM (China) Tian Q	21	21
(Thailand) P Chalardchaleam (Thailand) S Amitrapai	21	15	18
4	(Thailand) S Anugritayawon (Thailand) K Voravichitchaikul	19	21	21
(Japan) K Hayakawa (Japan) A Takahashi	14	16
8	(South Korea) Ko S-h (South Korea) Ha J-e	21	21
(China) He HB (China) Ma J	21	21
2	(Poland) R Mateusiak (Poland) N Zieba	19	14

Quarterfinals
(China) Tao JM (China) Tian Q	21	21
4	(Thailand) S Anugritayawon (Thailand) K Voravichitchaikul	14	19
8	(South Korea) Ko S-h (South Korea) Ha J-e	16	21	19
(China) He HB (China) Ma J	21	19	21

Semifinals
(China) Tao JM (China) Tian Q	21	8	21
(China) He HB (China) Ma J	17	21	13

=== Finals ===
Semifinals
5	(China) Zhang Nan (China) Zhao Yunlei	21	21
(Malaysia) Chan Peng Soon (Malaysia) Goh Liu Ying	17	18
(China) Tao Jiaming (China) Tian Qing	21	8	21
(China) He Hanbin (China) Ma Jin	17	21	13

Final
5	(China) Zhang Nan (China) Zhao Yunlei	18	17
(China) Tao Jiaming (China) Tian Qing	21	21

Preceded by 2010 French Super Series	2010 BWF Super Series	Succeeded by 2010 Hong Kong Super Series
