= Maria Febe Kusumastuti =

Indonesian badminton player (born 1989)

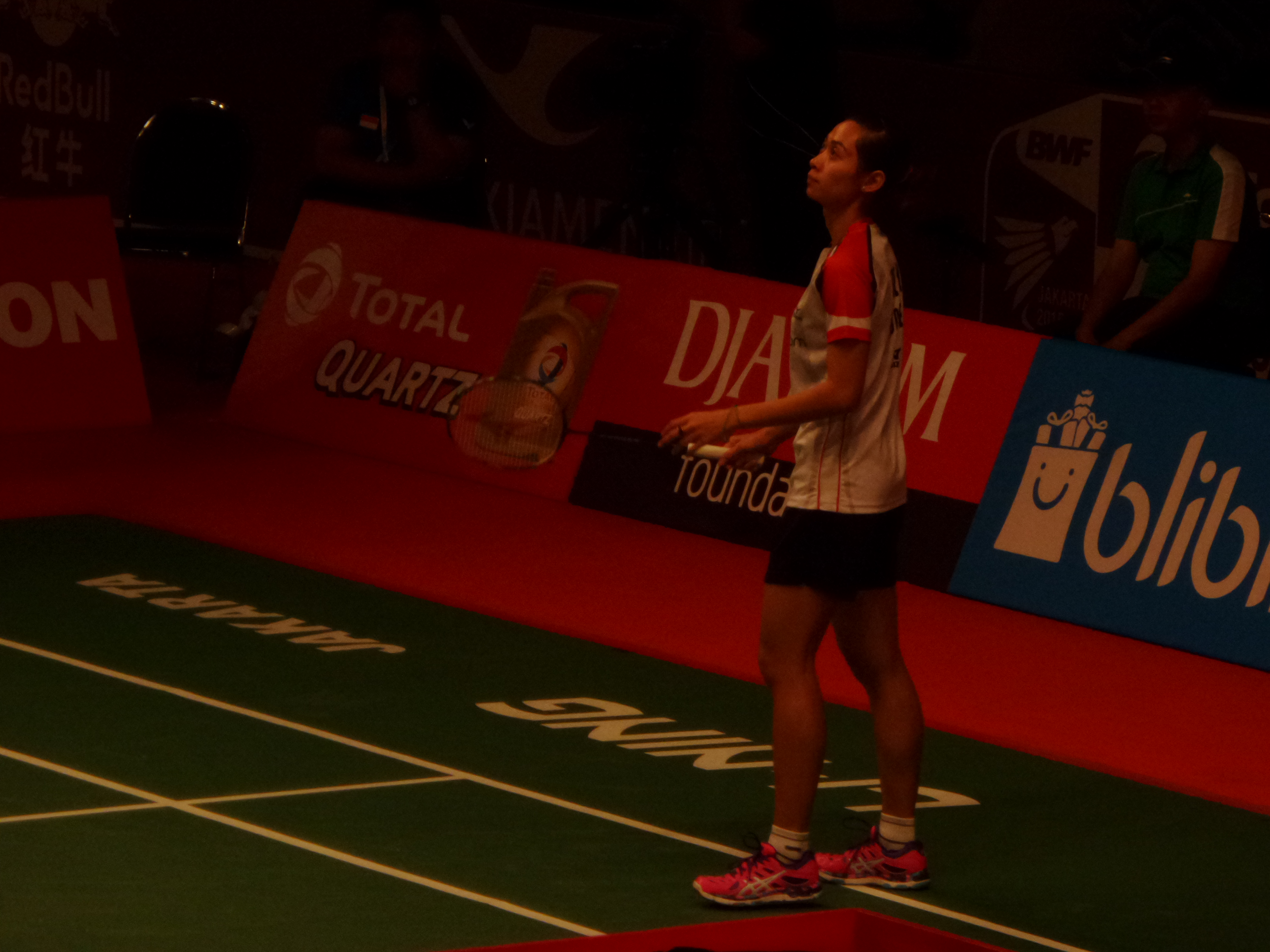

Personal information
- Born: 30 September 1989 (age 37) Boyolali, Central Java, Indonesia
- Height: 1.63 m (5 ft 4 in)
- Weight: 49 kg (108 lb)

Sport
- Country: Indonesia
- Sport: Badminton
- Handedness: Right

Women's singles
- Highest ranking: 18 (18 March 2010)
- Current ranking: 1605 (XD with Andrei Adistia 21 September 2021)
- BWF profile
Medal record
Women's badminton
Representing Indonesia
Uber Cup
Bronze medal – third place	2010 Kuala Lumpur	Women's team
Asian Games
Bronze medal – third place	2010 Guangzhou	Women's team
SEA Games
Silver medal – second place	2011 Jakarta–Palembang	Women's team
Asian Junior Championships
Bronze medal – third place	2007 Kuala Lumpur	Mixed team

Maria Febe Kusumastuti (born 30 September 1989) is an Indonesian badminton player from Boyolali, Central Java.

== Career ==
In 2008, she won women's singles at the Bitburger Open. The next year, she won women's singles at the Australia Open after beating the 1st seeded Yip Pui Yin with a straight set, 21–18, 21–19. Febe played on the 2010 Uber Cup teams for Indonesia which finished at the semifinals after being defeated by China 0–3. She lost to Wang Yihan at the first match. In the 2009 Indonesia Open Superseries, she made a surprise by beating the 5th-seeded Pi Hongyan of France, 24–22, 6–21, 21–15 in the first round, but then lost to Wang Lin at the quarterfinals. She played in 2010 All England Open Superseries and beat Wang Shixian of China, 21–13, 15–21, 21–16, in the first round. Unfortunately, she lost to Jiang Yanjiao of China in straight sets. In 2010, she reached the semifinals at Indonesia Grand Prix Gold but was beaten by Ratchanok Intanon in three sets 17–21, 21–16, 17–21; Intanon later became the world champion in 2013.

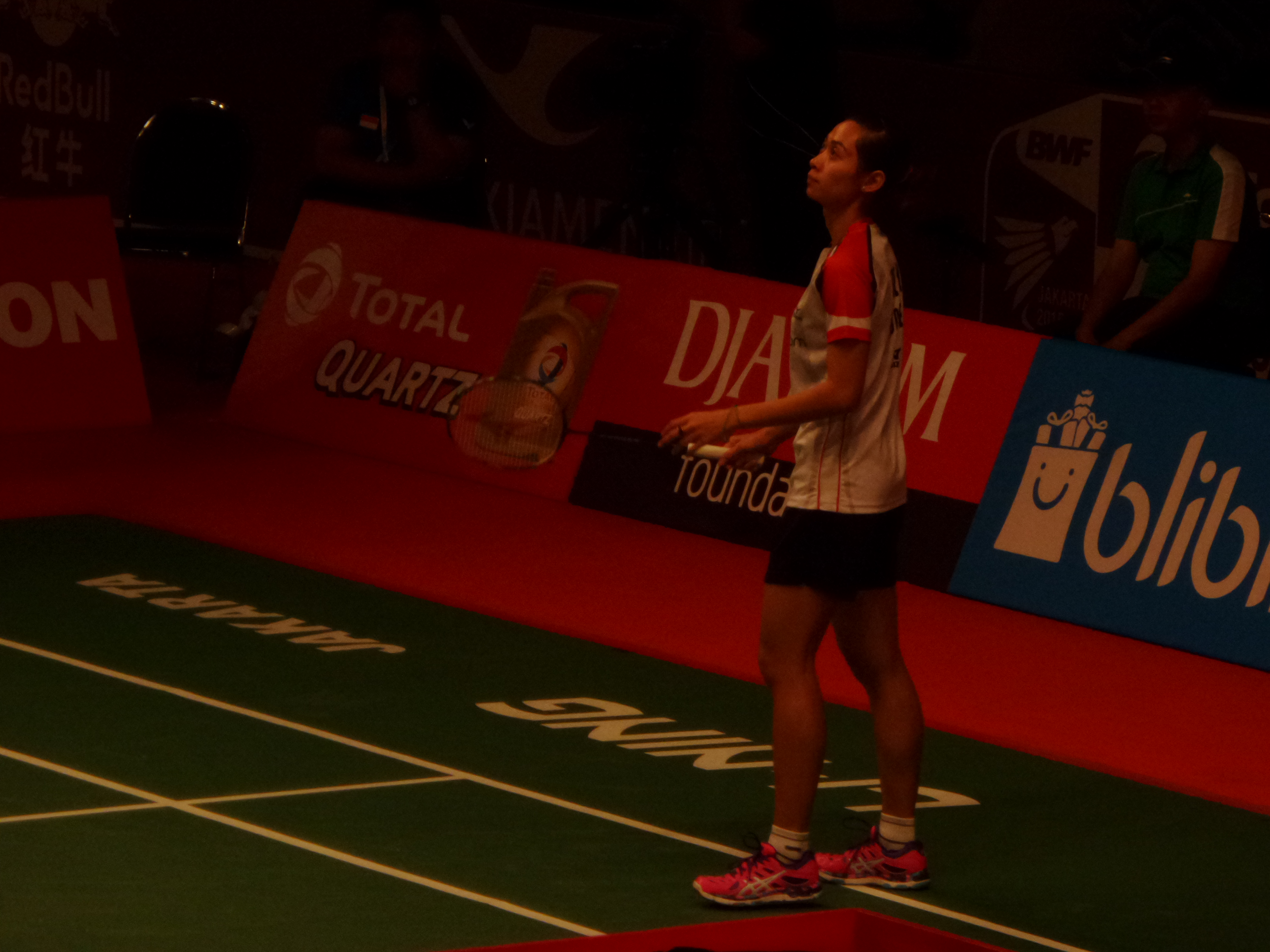
Kusumastuti at 2015 BWF World Championships

== Personal life ==
Kusumastuti married a former national badminton player from PB Djarum, Andrei Adistia on 27 October 2017.

== Achievements ==
=== BWF Grand Prix (2 titles, 1 runner-up) ===
The BWF Grand Prix had two levels, the Grand Prix and Grand Prix Gold. It was a series of badminton tournaments sanctioned by the Badminton World Federation (BWF) and played between 2007 and 2017.

Women's singles
Year	Tournament	Opponent	Score	Result	Ref.
2008	Bitburger Open	(India) Aditi Mutatkar	22–24, 21–8, 23–21	(gold) Winner	
2009	Australian Open	(Hong Kong) Yip Pui Yin	21–18, 21–19	(gold) Winner	
2009	New Zealand Open	(Japan) Sayaka Sato	10–21, 16–21	(silver) Runner-up	

BWF Grand Prix Gold tournament
BWF Grand Prix tournament

=== BWF International Challenge/Series (1 title, 1 runner-up) ===
Women's singles
Year	Tournament	Opponent	Score	Result	Ref.
2006	Brazil International	(Indonesia) Maria Elfira Christina	21–15, 21–18	(gold) Winner	
2014	Bulgarian International	(Spain) Beatriz Corrales	25–23, 15–21, 12–21	(silver) Runner-up	

BWF International Challenge tournament
BWF International Series tournament

=== BWF Junior International (1 title, 1 runner-up) ===
Girls' singles
Year	Tournament	Opponent	Score	Result	Ref.
2007	Dutch Junior	(Indonesia) Aprilia Yuswandari	12–21, 21–16, 21–15	(gold) Winner	
2007	German Junior	(Indonesia) Aprilia Yuswandari	7–21, 21–18, 10–21	(silver) Runner-up	

BWF Junior International Grand Prix tournament
BWF Junior International Challenge tournament
BWF Junior International Series tournament
BWF Junior Future Series tournament

== Performance timeline ==
Key

W	Won	F	Finalist	SF	Semi-finalist
QF	Quarter-finalist	#R	Rounds 4, 3, 2, 1	RR	Round-robin stage
Q#	Qualification round	A	Absent	w/d	Withdrew
G	Gold	S	Silver	B	Bronze
NH	Not held	N/A	Not applicable	DNQ	Did not qualify

=== National team ===
- Junior level

Team event	2007
Asian Junior Championships	B

- Senior level

Team event	2011
Southeast Asian Games	S

Team event	2010
Asian Games	B

Team event	2010
Uber Cup	B

=== Individual competitions ===
- Senior level

Event	2010	2011	2013	2014	2015
World Championships	2R	A			2R

Tournament	BWF Grand Prix and Grand Prix Gold								Best
Tournament	2008	2009	2010	2011	2012	2013	2014	2015	Best
Australian Open	N/A	W	A		1R	A	N/A		W (2009)
New Zealand Open	A	F	NH	N/A	NH	A		QF	F (2009)
Bitburger Open	W	A						QF	W (2008)
