= Wang Shixian =

Chinese badminton player (born 1990)

Wang Shixian 王适娴
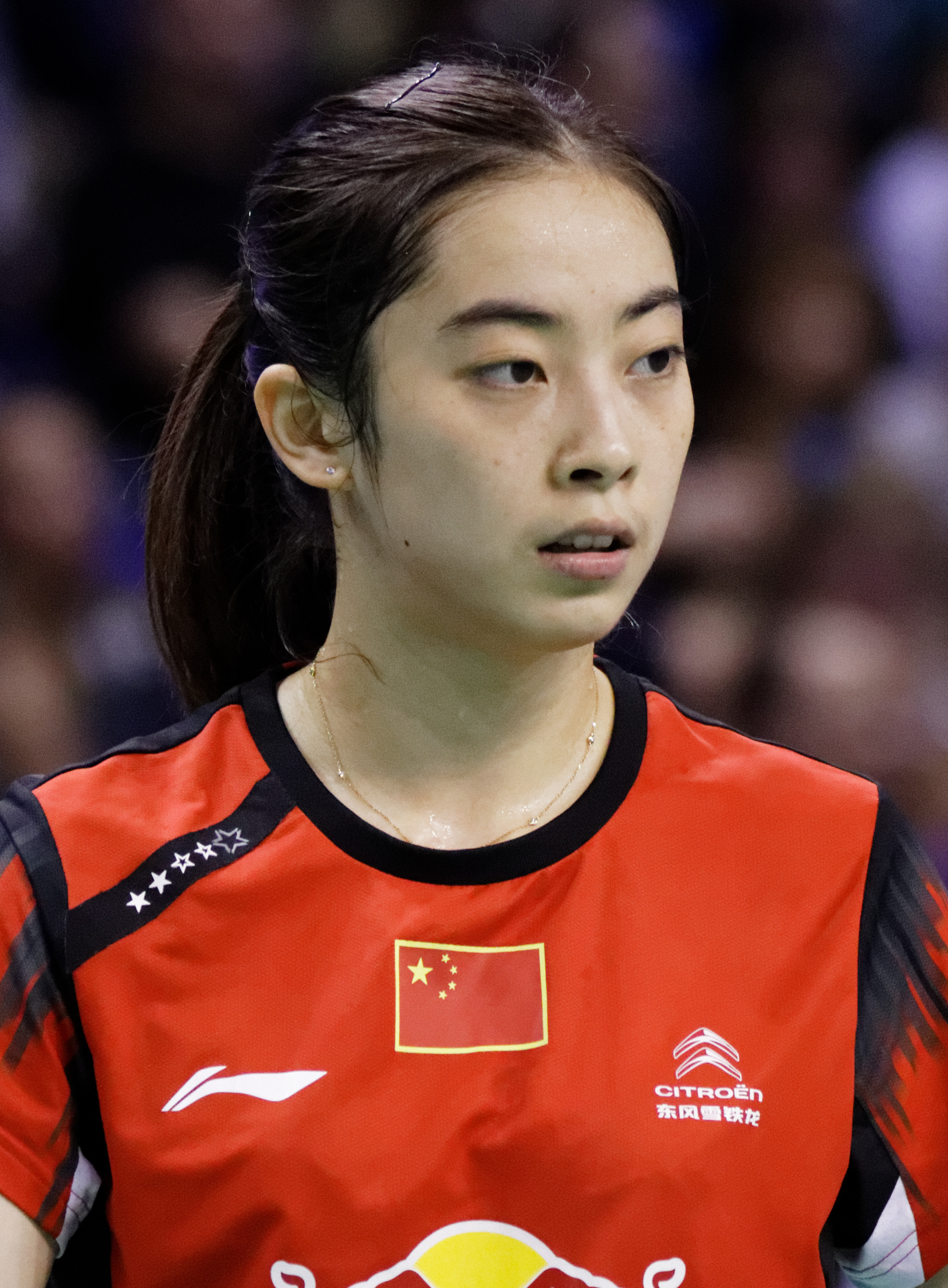
- Wang at the 2013 French Super Series

Personal information
- Born: 13 February 1990 (age 36) Suzhou, Jiangsu, China
- Height: 1.68 m (5 ft 6 in)
- Weight: 58 kg (128 lb)
- Spouse: Chen Long (m. 2017)

Sport
- Country: China
- Sport: Badminton
- Handedness: Right
- Coached by: Chen Jin

Women's singles
- Career record: 284 wins, 87 losses
- Highest ranking: 1 (13 January 2011)
- BWF profile
Medal record
Women's badminton
Representing China
World Championships
Bronze medal – third place	2010 Paris	Women's singles
Sudirman Cup
Gold medal – first place	2011 Qingdao	Mixed team
Gold medal – first place	2013 Kuala Lumpur	Mixed team
Gold medal – first place	2015 Dongguan	Mixed team
Uber Cup
Gold medal – first place	2012 Wuhan	Women's team
Gold medal – first place	2014 New Delhi	Women's team
Gold medal – first place	2016 Kunshan	Women's team
Silver medal – second place	2010 Kuala Lumpur	Women's team
Asian Games
Gold medal – first place	2010 Guangzhou	Women's singles
Gold medal – first place	2010 Guangzhou	Women's team
Gold medal – first place	2014 Incheon	Women's team
Asian Championships
Silver medal – second place	2014 Gimcheon	Women's singles
Bronze medal – third place	2012 Qingdao	Women's singles
Asia Team Championships
Gold medal – first place	2016 Hyderabad	Women's team
East Asian Games
Gold medal – first place	2013 Tianjin	Women's team
Silver medal – second place	2013 Tianjin	Women's singles
World Junior Championships
Gold medal – first place	2007 Waitakere City	Mixed team
Gold medal – first place	2008 Pune	Mixed team
Bronze medal – third place	2008 Pune	Girls' singles
Asian Junior Championships
Gold medal – first place	2008 Kuala Lumpur	Mixed team
Silver medal – second place	2008 Kuala Lumpur	Girls' singles

Wang Shixian
- Simplified Chinese: 王适娴
- Traditional Chinese: 王適嫻
Transcriptions
Standard Mandarin
- Hanyu Pinyin: Wáng Shìxián
- IPA: [wǎŋ.ʂî ɕjɛ̌n]

Wang Shixian (Chinese: 王适娴; pinyin: Wáng Shìxián; Mandarin pronunciation: [wǎŋ.ʂî ɕjɛ̌n]; born 13 February 1990) is a retired Chinese professional badminton player. She is a former World No. 1 in women's singles.

== Career ==
Wang Shixian was admitted into Chinese Junior National Team in 2005 and was soon promoted to the second-level adult team a year later, but she got the chance to compete in the international stages only in 2009, after being promoted to the first-level adult team.

=== 2007–2009 ===
Wang participated in 2007 BWF World Junior Championships being unseeded. She lost to Bae Yeon-ju there in straight games. In 2008, she won a silver medal in 2008 Asian Junior Badminton Championships, after losing to Li Xuerui, her compatriot. She also won a bronze medal in 2008 BWF World Junior Championships losing the semifinal to eventual winner Saina Nehwal.

In 2009, she stunned several seeded players in Malaysia Open Grand Prix Gold, including former world champion Zhu Lin in the second round, and reached the final. By beating her teammate Wang Xin there, she won her career's first-ever title. She won her first superseries title by winning 2009 China Masters Super Series in which she beat a series of strong rivals on her way, including no. 4 seed Wang Yihan in quarter-final, reigning world champion Lu Lan in semis, and no. 2 seeded Wang Lin in the final.

=== 2010–2011 ===
Wang won 2 superseries titles this year, first one was 2010 Korea Open Super Series, where she beat Sung Ji-hyun in the final and another one was the 2010 Swiss Super Series event, by beating Jiang Yanjiao of China.

In the 2010 BWF World Championships, she defeated Saina Nehwal in the quarter-final and assured herself of the first ever major medal in her career. She settled for a bronze medal after losing the semifinal to Wang Xin with 19–21, 21–11, 16–21. She savoured her career's biggest ever success by winning the gold medal in the 2010 Asian games, beating her recent nemesis Wang Xin in the final with 21–18, 21–15 scores. She had runner-up finishes at the 2010 China Open Super Series and 2010 Hong Kong Super Series events also later in the year.

In 2011, Wang took part in the 2010 BWF Super Series Finals. In the group stage, she defeated Yao Jie, Salakjit Ponsana & Bae Yeon-ju in straight games. With her group victories, she advanced to the semifinal where she met Hong Kong's Yip Pui Yin and beat her in 2 games. Her opponent for the final was Bae Yeon-ju, whom Shixian defeated earlier in the group stage. This time too, Wang beat her, with 21–13, 21–15 scores and claimed the title victory which helped her to reach the World no. 1 position for the first time after ranks were updated next week. She then won the 2011 Malaysia Super Series after securing a stunning victory against Wang Yihan. Only after a week, she lost to same opponent Wang Yihan in the final of 2011 Korea Super Series. She claimed her first ever All England crown with her fascinating victory over Japan's Eriko Hirose in the final of 2011 All England Super Series with 24–22, 21–18 scoreline. She was seeded top in the 2011 BWF World Championships where she was upset by Taipei's shuttler Cheng Shao-chieh in quarter-final. She then claimed 2011 China Masters Super Series title when she was leading 21–16 and 8–5 & her opponent Jiang Yanjiao retired. She also claimed Macau Open title in the year end by beating Han Li in the summit clash.

=== 2012 ===
Wang won the Korean Open title by beating Jiang Yanjiao in the final clash. She was the finalist in the 2012 Swiss Open Grand Prix Gold, where she gone down against Saina Nehwal. She won her first Asian Championship medal when she reached the semifinal. But was defeated by Wang Yihan hence settled for bronze. She was the prime contender from China for the participation in the 2012 Olympics, other already confirmed players from China were Wang Yihan and Wang Xin. But there was another rising Chinese player Li Xuerui who was ranked below Wang Shixian but with her stunning 6 finals in the 1st half of 2012 made her ranking points more than Shixian and hence, the head coach Li Yongbo selected Li instead of Wang Shixian to contest the Olympics, and Shixian's Olympic dream was broken. However some sources say she had relatively poor performance against other top players of different countries when compared to her teammates, significantly against players like Saina Nehwal & Juliane Schenk. Li Xuerui on the other hand had beaten them multiple times so that's why Shixian was omitted from the Olympic squad and Li was chosen. In year end finals, she reached the semifinal after having 2 group wins. She ousted Ratchanok Intanon there and advanced to final round. She retired when trailing 9–21, 4–15 against Li Xuerui and finished as runner-up.

=== 2013 ===
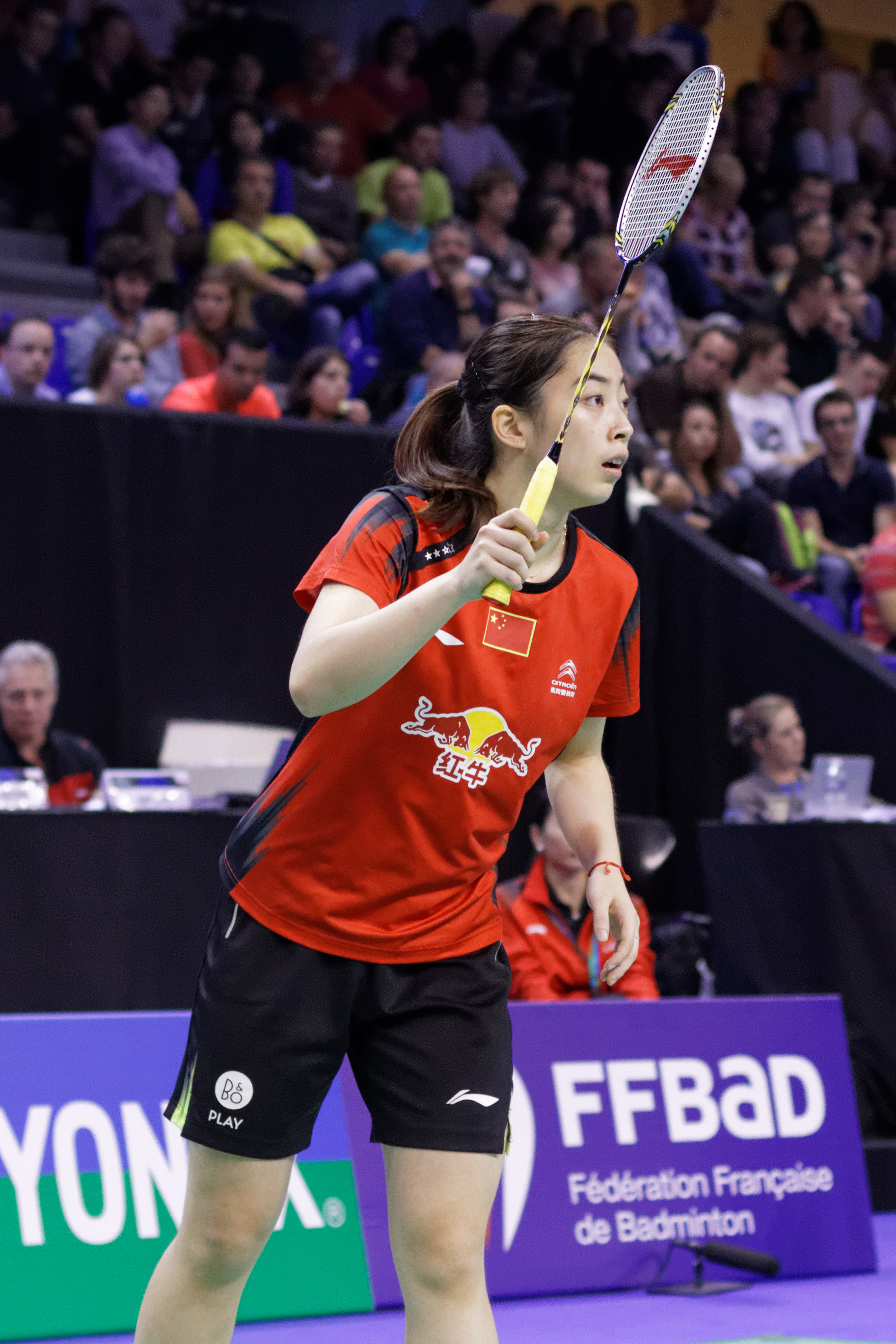
Wang during the quarter-final match at the 2013 French Super Series

After a moment of distress Wang Shixian started the year very well, she was runner-up to the Victor Korea Open where she was ousted by Sung Ji-hyun. She succeeded in taking the Swiss Open title by beating Ratchanok Intanon. Wang Shixian competed at the BWF world championship that took place in Guangzhou China as the 7th seed. Nonetheless, she lost against P. V. Sindhu again (18–21; 17–21) who also downed Wang's compatriot and defending champion Wang Yihan earlier in the 2nd round. The Chinese coaches later revealed that they took time to analyze Sindhu's game. In October, Wang Shixian played at the Yonex French Open Superseries as the 7 seed, she managed to climb her way to the final in getting rid of all her opponents in 2 straight games. Wang showed a great performance and overcame a tough challenge by Thailand's Porntip Buranaprasertsuk to win (21–18; 21–18) and grabbed her 1st Superseries title since the Victor Korea Open in 2012. She then lost in the finals of 2013 China Open Super Series Premier and 2013 Hong Kong Super Series to her team-mates Li Xuerui and Wang Yihan respectively. She put up a good show at the 2013 BWF Super Series Finals where she won all her group stage matches against Tai Tzu-ying, Sung Ji-hyun and Porntip Buranaprasertsuk in 2 games. She was favourite to win the semifinal after her repeat clash with Tai again. But this time, she suffered defeat, with very narrow margins in 3 tense games.

=== 2014 ===
She made her way to the final of the 2014 Malaysia Super Series Premier but lost against her compatriot Li Xuerui. She then afterwards won her 2nd All England title, in which she defeated the trio of Olympic medallists (Nehwal in quarter-final, Yihan in semifinal and Li Xuerui in the final) which made her victory even more memorable. Meanwhile, Chen Long made his way to the final and the English media seized the occasion to talk about the All England as the fulfillment of the love affair of Chen and Shixian. However, both of them confessed in an interview that they didn't know what went on in England and it was embarrassing to mix their professional relationship and private life in order to make the buzz. In the 2014 India Super Series, even though Wang faced tough opponents as she was reckoned as the player who's been on court the longest time that to say almost six hours, she won the title, beating Li Xuerui yet again 22–20, 21–19. In an Interview Shixian said "It's all about beating the others so as long as China wins we're happy" which shows the fair play and the support between players. She also settled for the silver medal in 2014 Badminton Asia Championships where she lost to Sung Ji-hyun who was playing in front of her home crowd. Wang was second-seeded in the 2014 BWF World Championships and was one of the favourites to win the tournament. But she was again defeated in a thrilling quarter-final match against P. V. Sindhu, a player to whom Wang lost to in the previous year. In September Wang played in the team event of the Asian games. She and her team won the gold medal beating the Korean team 3–0. However, she didn't get selected in the individual event. In October, Wang Shixian retained her French title, her third superseries title of the year, after Li Xuerui retired in the 2nd game, 21–15, 8–5. Wang Shixian qualified in first place for the year end Super Series Finals staged for the first time in Dubai. She lost all three of her round-robin matches in straight sets and exited the tournament.

=== 2015–2016 ===
2015 proved disappointing year for Wang, as she was stopped in the semifinals of many tournaments. In her quarter-final at the 2015 Malaysia Super Series Premier, she played the longest ever Women's singles badminton match against Nozomi Okuhara, which lasted for 1 hours & 51 minutes. Wang won that encounter and Okuhara was left cramping in that historic match. She did have final appearances at the 2015 Australian Super Series and 2015 French Super Series, both of them being lost to Carolina Marín. She was also a quarterfinalist at the 2015 BWF World Championships, where she lost to Marín again. In the 2014 BWF Super Series Finals, she won only one match (against Sung Ji-hyun) & lost other 2 group matches which denied her advancement in the semifinals.

In 2016, she paddled off the year with the runner-up finish at the 2016 German Open Grand Prix Gold where she lost to Li Xuerui. In her overall 3rd final at the All England Open, Wang was beaten by Nozomi Okuhara in a controversial 3-gamer, in which she lost a close 11–21, 21–16, 19–21 match. In the 2016 Chinese Taipei Open Grand Prix Gold, she made her way to the final before losing to local star Tai Tzu-ying in the final. Just like the last Olympics, Shixian again failed to participate in the 2016 Olympics, as Chinese team selected higher ranked Wang Yihan as a 2nd qualifier from China, another already confirmed player was the defending Olympic champion Li Xuerui. She subsequently decided to take retirement from the professional badminton.

== Personal life ==
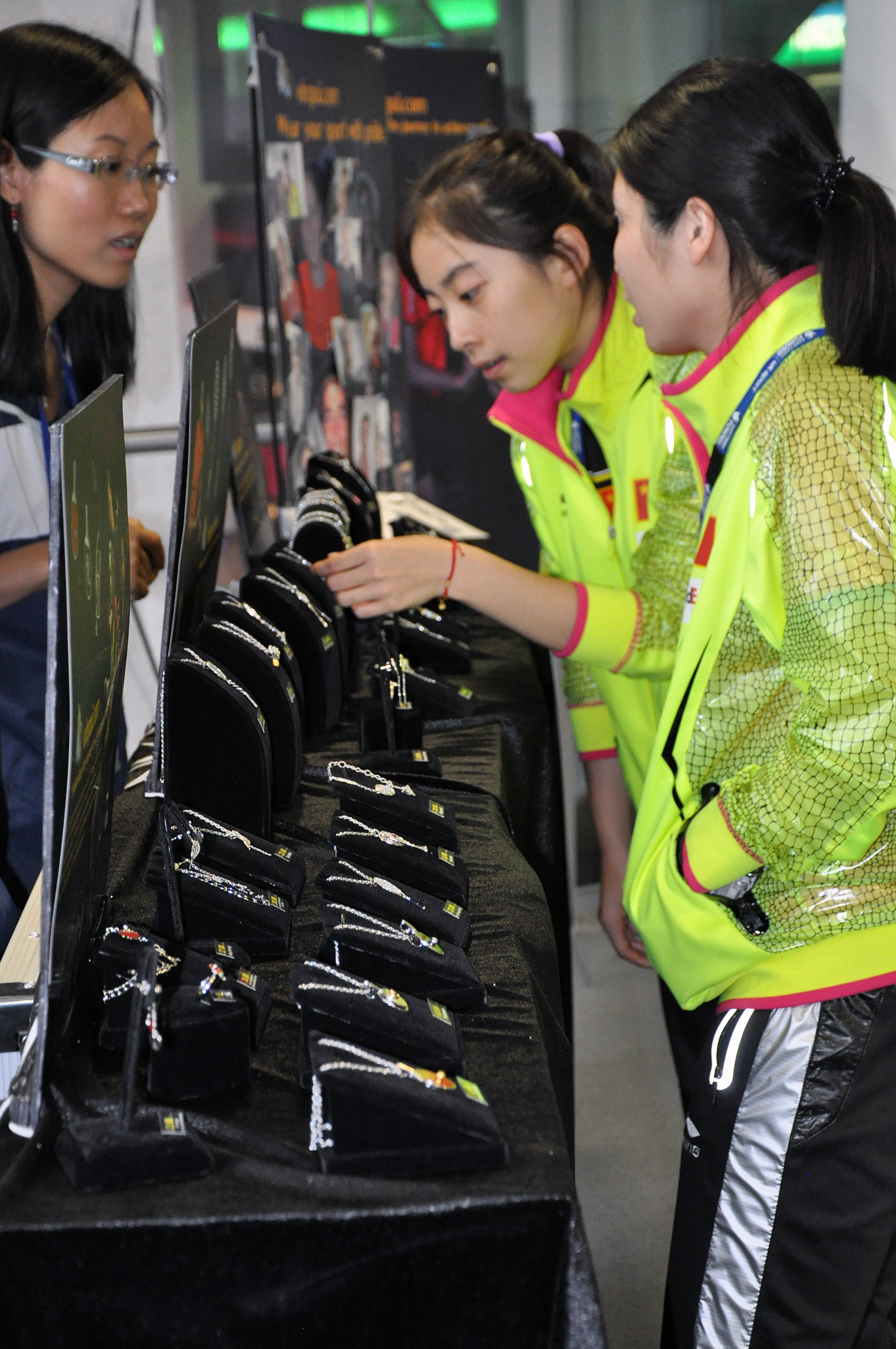
Wang (back) and teammate Jiang Yanjiao shopping for jewelry in 2011.

Wang graduated from the Nanjing University of Finance and Economics with a bachelor's degree. After retirement she finished a master's degree in sports education at the Beijing Sports University where she has taught since 2020.

She married former teammate Chen Long in 2017, after over a decade together. She gave birth to a son Chen Shanyang, nickname "Coffee", in June 2019.

As a child she attended a sports school in Jiangsu province. The boy who sat next to her during classes was table tennis player Xu Xin.

== Achievements ==
=== BWF World Championships ===
Women's singles
Year	Venue	Opponent	Score	Result
2010	Stade Pierre de Coubertin, Paris, France	(China) Wang Xin	19–21, 21–11, 16–21	Bronze

=== Asian Games ===
Women's singles
Year	Venue	Opponent	Score	Result
2010	Tianhe Gymnasium, Guangzhou, China	(China) Wang Xin	21–18, 21–15	Gold

=== Asian Championships ===
Women's singles
Year	Venue	Opponent	Score	Result
2012	Qingdao Sports Centre Conson Stadium, Qingdao, China	(China) Wang Yihan	19–21, 12–21	Bronze
2014	Gimcheon Indoor Stadium, Gimcheon, South Korea	(South Korea) Sung Ji-hyun	19–21, 15–21	Silver

=== East Asian Games ===
Women's singles
Year	Venue	Opponent	Score	Result
2013	Binhai New Area Dagang Gymnasium, Tianjin, China	(China) Han Li	21–14, 17–21, 20–22	Silver

=== BWF World Junior Championships ===
Girls' singles
Year	Venue	Opponent	Score	Result
2008	Shree Shiv Chhatrapati Badminton Hall, Pune, India	(India) Saina Nehwal	20–22, 12–21	Bronze

=== BWF Superseries (12 titles, 11 runners-up) ===
The BWF Superseries, launched on 14 December 2006 and implemented in 2007, is a series of elite badminton tournaments, sanctioned by Badminton World Federation (BWF). BWF Superseries has two level such as Superseries and Superseries Premier. A season of Superseries features twelve tournaments around the world, which introduced since 2011, with successful players invited to the Superseries Finals held at the year end.

Women's singles
Year	Tournament	Opponent	Score	Result
2009	China Masters	(China) Wang Lin	21–14, 14–21, 21–14	(gold) Winner
2010	Korea Open	(South Korea) Sung Ji-hyun	21–10, 25–23	(gold) Winner
2010	Swiss Open	(China) Jiang Yanjiao	21–15, 21–19	(gold) Winner
2010	China Open	(China) Jiang Yanjiao	16–21, 19–21	(silver) Runner-up
2010	Hong Kong Open	(India) Saina Nehwal	21–15, 16–21, 17–21	(silver) Runner-up
2010	World Superseries Finals	(South Korea) Bae Youn-joo	21–13, 21–15	(gold) Winner
2011	Malaysia Open	(China) Wang Yihan	21–18, 21–14	(gold) Winner
2011	Korea Open	(China) Wang Yihan	14–21, 18–21	(silver) Runner-up
2011	All England Open	(Japan) Eriko Hirose	24–22, 21–18	(gold) Winner
2011	China Masters	(China) Jiang Yanjiao	21–16, 8–5 retired	(gold) Winner
2012	Korea Open	(China) Jiang Yanjiao	21–12, 21–17	(gold) Winner
2012	World Superseries Finals	(China) Li Xuerui	9–21, 4–15 retired	(silver) Runner-up
2013	Korea Open	(South Korea) Sung Ji-hyun	12–21, 20–22	(silver) Runner-up
2013	French Open	(Thailand) Porntip Buranaprasertsuk	21–18, 21–18	(gold) Winner
2013	China Open	(China) Li Xuerui	21–16, 17–21, 19–21	(silver) Runner-up
2013	Hong Kong Open	(China) Wang Yihan	13–21, 21–16, 15–21	(silver) Runner-up
2014	Malaysia Open	(China) Li Xuerui	16–21, 17–21	(silver) Runner-up
2014	All England Open	(China) Li Xuerui	21–19, 21–18	(gold) Winner
2014	India Open	(China) Li Xuerui	22–20, 21–19	(gold) Winner
2014	French Open	(China) Li Xuerui	21–15, 8–3 retired	(gold) Winner
2015	Australian Open	(Spain) Carolina Marín	20–22, 18–21	(silver) Runner-up
2015	French Open	(Spain) Carolina Marín	18–21, 10–21	(silver) Runner-up
2016	All England Open	(Japan) Nozomi Okuhara	11–21, 21–16, 19–21	(silver) Runner-up

BWF Super Series Finals tournament
BWF Super Series Premier tournament
BWF Super Series tournament

=== BWF Grand Prix (3 titles, 3 runners-up) ===
The BWF Grand Prix had two levels, the BWF Grand Prix and Grand Prix Gold. It was a series of badminton tournaments sanctioned by the Badminton World Federation (BWF) which was held from 2007 to 2017.

Women's singles
Year	Tournament	Opponent	Score	Result
2009	Malaysia Grand Prix Gold	(China) Wang Xin	21–16, 18–21, 21–10	(gold) Winner
2011	Macau Open	(China) Han Li	21–14, 21–14	(gold) Winner
2012	Swiss Open	(India) Saina Nehwal	19–21, 16–21	(silver) Runner-up
2013	Swiss Open	(Thailand) Ratchanok Intanon	21–16, 21–12	(gold) Winner
2016	German Open	(China) Li Xuerui	14–21, 17–21	(silver) Runner-up
2016	Chinese Taipei Open	(Chinese Taipei) Tai Tzu-ying	21–23, 6–21	(silver) Runner-up

BWF Grand Prix Gold tournament
BWF Grand Prix tournament

== Performance timeline ==
=== Singles performance timeline ===
Key

W	F	SF	QF	#R	RR	Q#	A	G	S	B	NH	N/A	DNQ

(W) won; (F) finalist; (SF) semi-finalist; (QF) quarter-finalist; (#R) rounds 4, 3, 2, 1; (RR) round-robin stage; (Q#) qualification round; (A) absent; (G) gold, (S) silver or (B) bronze medal; (NH) not held; (N/A) not applicable; (DNQ) did not qualify.
To avoid confusion and double counting, these charts are updated at the conclusion of a tournament or when the player's participation has ended.

To avoid confusion and double counting, information in this table is updated only once a tournament or the player's participation in the tournament has concluded. This table is current through 2016 All England Super Series Premier.

Tournament	2007	2008	2009	2010	2011	2012	2013	2014	2015	2016	SR	W–L	Win %
Summer Olympics	NH	A	not held			A	not held				0 / 0		
World Championships	A	NH	A	SF-B; 3–1	QF; 2–1	NH	QF; 2–1	QF; 2–1	QF; 2–1	NH	0 / 5	11–5	69%
World Superseries Finals	NH	absent		W 5–0	A	F 3–2	SF; 3–1	RR; 0–3	RR; 1–2		1 / 5	12–8	60%
Asian Championships	absent				2R; 1–1	SF-B; 3–1	2R; 1–1	S 3–1	3R; 1–1		0 / 5	9–5	64%
Asian Games	not held			G 4–0	not held			A	not held		1 / 1	4–0	100%
East Asian Games	not held		A	not held			S 2–1	not held			0 / 1	2–1	67%
Team Competitions
Uber Cup	NH	A	NH	S 1–0	NH	G 1–0	NH	G 5–0	NH		2 / 3	7–0	100%
Sudirman Cup	A	NH	A	NH	G 1–1	NH	A	NH	A	NH	1 / 1	1–1	50%
Asian Games	not held			G 2–0	not held			G 3–0	not held		2 / 2	5–0	100%
East Asian Games	not held		A	not held			G 2–0	not held			1 / 1	2–0	100%
BWF World Superseries Premier
All England Open	absent			1R; 0–1	W 5–0	SF; 3–1	QF; 2–1	W 5–0	QF; 2–1		2 / 6	17–4	81%
Malaysia Open	absent			2R; 1–1	W 5–0	SF; 3–1	A	F 4–1	SF; 3–1		1 / 5	16–4	80%
Indonesia Open	absent				1R; 1–1	QF; 2–1	1R; 0–1	SF; 3–1	SF; 3–1		0 / 5	9–5	64%
Denmark Open	absent				SF; 3–1	QF; 2–1	SF; 3–1	SF; 3–1	QF; 2–1		0 / 5	13–5	72%
China Open	Q3; 2–1	Q2; 0–1	SF; 3–1	F 4–1	2R; 1–1	2R; 1–1	F 4–1	2R; 1–1	SF; 3–1		0 / 9	18–9	67%
BWF World Superseries
India Open	NH	A	2R; 1–1	absent		QF; 2–1	A	W 5–0	A		1 / 3	8–2	80%
Singapore Open	absent				SF; 3–1	A	QF; 2–1	A	SF; 3–1		0 / 3	8–3	73%
Australian Open	absent							SF; 3–1	F 4–1		0 / 2	7–2	78%
Japan Open	absent			SF; 3–1	QF; 2–1	A	QF; 2–1	A	SF; 3–1		0 / 4	10–4	71%
Korea Open	absent			W 5–0	F 4–1	W 5–0	F 4–1	SF; 3–1	SF; 3–1		2 / 6	24–4	86%
French Open	absent		2R; 1–1	A	1R; 0–1	2R; 1–1	W 5–0	W 5–0	F 4–1		2 / 6	16–4	80%
Hong Kong Open	absent		QF; 2–1	F 4–1	SF; 3–1	2R; 1–1	F 4–1	2R; 1–1	A		0 / 6	15–6	71%
BWF Grand Prix Gold and Grand Prix
Malaysia Masters	not held		W 7–0	absent							1 / 1	7–0	100%
Swiss Open	absent			W 5–0	A	F 4–1	W 5–0	QF; 2–1	absent		2 / 4	16–2	89%
China Masters	absent		W 5–0	SF; 3–1	W 5–0	2R; 0–1	1R; 0–1	absent			2 / 5	13–3	81%
Chinese Taipei Open	absent								QF; 2–1		0 / 2	6–2	75%
Macau Open	absent		2R; 1–1	A	W 5–0	absent					1 / 1	5–0	100%
Philippines Open	A	NH	SF; 3–1	not held							0 / 1	3–1	75%
Career Statistics
	2007	2008	2009	2010	2011	2012	2013	2014	2015	2016			
Tournaments played	1	1	8	13	15	14	16	16	13		97		
Titles	0	0	2	5	5	2	3	5	0		22		
Finals Reached	0	0	2	8	6	4	7	7	2		36		
Overall win–loss	2–1	0–1	23–6	40–11	41–11	31–13	41–13	48–13	36–15		262–84		
Win Percentage	67%	0%	79%	78%	79%	70%	76%	79%	71%		75.72%		
Year End Ranking			12	2	3	5	2	2	6				

== Record against selected opponents ==
Record against year-end Finals finalists, World Championships semi-finalists, and Olympic quarter-finalists.

Players	Matches	Results		Difference
Players	Matches	Won	Lost	Difference
(Bulgaria) Petya Nedelcheva	2	2	0	+2
(China) Chen Yufei	1	1	0	+1
(China) He Bingjiao	3	3	0	+3
(China) Li Xuerui	17	8	9	–1
(China) Lu Lan	3	2	1	+1
(China) Wang Lin	3	3	0	+3
(China) Wang Xin	13	7	6	+1
(China) Wang Yihan	18	5	13	–8
(China) Zhu Lin	1	1	0	+1
(Chinese Taipei) Cheng Shao-chieh	5	3	2	+1
(Chinese Taipei) Tai Tzu-ying	12	7	5	+2
(Denmark) Tine Baun	4	2	2	0
(France) Pi Hongyan	4	3	1	+2
(Germany) Juliane Schenk	9	6	3	+3
(Hong Kong) Wang Chen	2	2	0	+2

Players	Matches	Results		Difference
Players	Matches	Won	Lost	Difference
(Hong Kong) Yip Pui Yin	10	10	0	+10
(Hong Kong) Zhou Mi	1	1	0	+1
(India) Saina Nehwal	15	7	8	–1
(India) P. V. Sindhu	10	6	4	+2
(Indonesia) Lindaweni Fanetri	4	4	0	+4
(Indonesia) Maria Kristin Yulianti	1	1	0	+1
(Japan) Minatsu Mitani	8	7	1	+6
(Japan) Nozomi Okuhara	4	2	2	0
(Japan) Akane Yamaguchi	4	2	2	0
(Malaysia) Wong Mew Choo	1	1	0	+1
(South Korea) Bae Yeon-ju	22	19	3	+16
(South Korea) Sung Ji-hyun	12	7	5	+2
(Spain) Carolina Marín	9	5	4	+1
(Thailand) Porntip Buranaprasertsuk	10	9	1	+8
(Thailand) Ratchanok Intanon	12	8	4	+4
