= Wang Xin (badminton) =

Chinese badminton player

Wang Xin 汪鑫
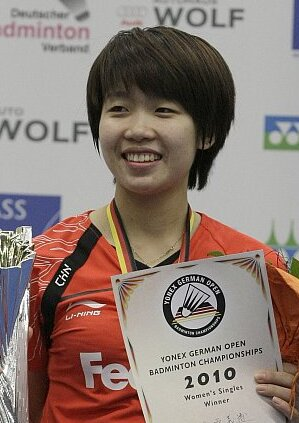
- Wang at the 2010 German Open Grand Prix

Personal information
- Born: 10 November 1985 (age 41) Shenyang, Liaoning, China
- Height: 1.66 m (5 ft 5 1/2 in)
- Weight: 55 kg (121 lb; 8.7 st)

Sport
- Country: China
- Sport: Badminton
- Handedness: Left
- Coached by: Zhang Ning
- Retired: 5 December 2013

Women's singles
- Highest ranking: 1 (23 September 2010)
- BWF profile
Medal record
Women's badminton
Representing China
World Championships
Silver medal – second place	2010 Paris	Women's singles
Bronze medal – third place	2011 London	Women's singles
Sudirman Cup
Gold medal – first place	2011 Qingdao	Mixed team
Uber Cup
Gold medal – first place	2012 Wuhan	Women's team
Silver medal – second place	2010 Kuala Lumpur	Women's team
Asian Games
Gold medal – first place	2010 Guangzhou	Women's team
Silver medal – second place	2010 Guangzhou	Women's singles

Wang Xin
- Traditional Chinese: 汪鑫
- Simplified Chinese: 汪鑫
Transcriptions
Standard Mandarin
- Hanyu Pinyin: Wāng Xīn

Wang Xin (Chinese: 汪鑫; pinyin: Wāng Xīn; born 10 November 1985) is a retired badminton player from China and former World No. 1 women's singles player. She was awarded as Best Female Players of the Year by the BWF in 2010. Wang represented China in the 2012 Summer Olympics and had to forfeit the match in the bronze medal playoff game against Saina Nehwal of India in which she was 21–18, 1–0 up, due to a knee injury.

After the Olympics, Wang Xin struggled to get back into competition but was never successful due to the severity of her injury. In 2013, at the age of 28 years, she retired from professional badminton.

== Achievements ==
=== BWF World Championships ===
Women's singles
Year	Venue	Opponent	Score	Result
2010	Stade Pierre de Coubertin, Paris, France	(China) Wang Lin	11–21, 21–19, 13–21	Silver
2011	Wembley Arena, London, England	(China) Wang Yihan	14–21, 15–21	Bronze

=== Asian Games ===
Women's singles
Year	Venue	Opponent	Score	Result
2010	Tianhe Gymnasium, Guangzhou, China	(China) Wang Shixian	18–21, 15–21	Silver

=== BWF Superseries ===
The BWF Superseries, launched on 14 December 2006 and implemented in 2007, is a series of elite badminton tournaments, sanctioned by Badminton World Federation (BWF). BWF Superseries has two level such as Superseries and Superseries Premier. A season of Superseries features twelve tournaments around the world, which introduced since 2011, with successful players invited to the Superseries Finals held at the year end.

Women's singles
Year	Tournament	Opponent	Score	Result
2009	Japan Open	(China) Wang Yihan	8–21, 9–21	(silver) Runner-up
2009	China Open	(China) Jiang Yanjiao	19–21, 20–22	(silver) Runner-up
2010	Malaysia Open	(South Korea) Bae Yeon-ju	19–21, 21–17, 14–6 retired	(gold) Winner
2010	China Masters	(Denmark) Tine Baun	21–13, 21–9	(gold) Winner
2010	Japan Open	(China) Jiang Yanjiao	21–23, 18–21	(silver) Runner-up
2011	Singapore Open	(Denmark) Tine Baun	21–19, 21–17	(gold) Winner
2011	Denmark Open	(China) Wang Yihan	21–14, 23–21	(gold) Winner
2011	French Open	(China) Li Xuerui	21–15, 21–19	(gold) Winner
2011	Hong Kong Open	(Denmark) Tine Baun	21–17, 21–14	(gold) Winner
2011	China Open	(China) Wang Yihan	12–18 retired	(silver) Runner-up
2012	Malaysia Open	(China) Wang Yihan	19–21, 11–21	(silver) Runner-up

BWF Super Series Premier tournament
BWF Super Series tournament

=== BWF Grand Prix ===
The BWF Grand Prix had two levels, the BWF Grand Prix and Grand Prix Gold. It was a series of badminton tournaments sanctioned by the Badminton World Federation (BWF) which was held from 2007 to 2017.

Women's singles
Year	Tournament	Opponent	Score	Result
2009	Malaysia Grand Prix Gold	(China) Wang Shixian	16–21, 21–18, 10–21	(silver) Runner-up
2009	Philippines Open	(Hong Kong) Zhou Mi	21–10, 12–21, 23–21	(gold) Winner
2010	German Open	(Germany) Juliane Schenk	21–17, 21–18	(gold) Winner
2011	Malaysia Grand Prix Gold	(India) Saina Nehwal	13–21, 21–8, 21–14	(gold) Winner

BWF Grand Prix Gold tournament
BWF Grand Prix tournament

=== IBF International ===
Women's doubles
Year	Tournament	Partner	Opponent	Score	Result
2002	Macau Satellite	(China) Yuan Ting	(Japan) Yoshiko Iwata (Japan) Miyuki Tai	7–11, 11–9, 11–6	(gold) Winner
2003	Malaysia Satellite	(China) Pan Pan	(Japan) Aki Akao (Japan) Tomomi Matsuda	15–8, 9–15, 11–15	(silver) Runner-up

== Record against selected opponents ==
Record against year-end Finals finalists, World Championships semi-finalists, and Olympic quarter-finalists.

Players	Matches	Results		Difference
Players	Matches	Won	Lost	Difference
(Bulgaria) Petya Nedelcheva	3	3	0	+3
(China) Li Xuerui	6	5	1	+4
(China) Wang Lin	3	1	2	–1
(China) Wang Shixian	13	6	7	–1
(China) Wang Yihan	10	2	8	–6
(Chinese Taipei) Cheng Shao-chieh	2	2	0	+2
(Chinese Taipei) Tai Tzu-ying	3	1	2	–1
(Denmark) Tine Baun	9	9	0	+9
(France) Pi Hongyan	5	5	0	+5
(Germany) Juliane Schenk	4	3	1	+2
(Hong Kong) Yip Pui Yin	2	2	0	+2

Players	Matches	Results		Difference
Players	Matches	Won	Lost	Difference
(Hong Kong) Zhou Mi	2	2	0	+2
(India) Saina Nehwal	7	4	3	+1
(Indonesia) Lindaweni Fanetri	1	1	0	+1
(Indonesia) Maria Kristin Yulianti	1	1	0	+1
(Japan) Minatsu Mitani	1	0	1	–1
(Malaysia) Wong Mew Choo	5	5	0	+5
(South Korea) Bae Yeon-ju	9	8	1	+7
(South Korea) Sung Ji-hyun	7	4	3	+1
(Spain) Carolina Marín	2	2	0	+2
(Thailand) Porntip Buranaprasertsuk	5	5	0	+5
(Thailand) Ratchanok Intanon	3	3	0	+3
