= Jiang Yanjiao =

Chinese badminton player

Jiang Yanjiao 蒋燕皎
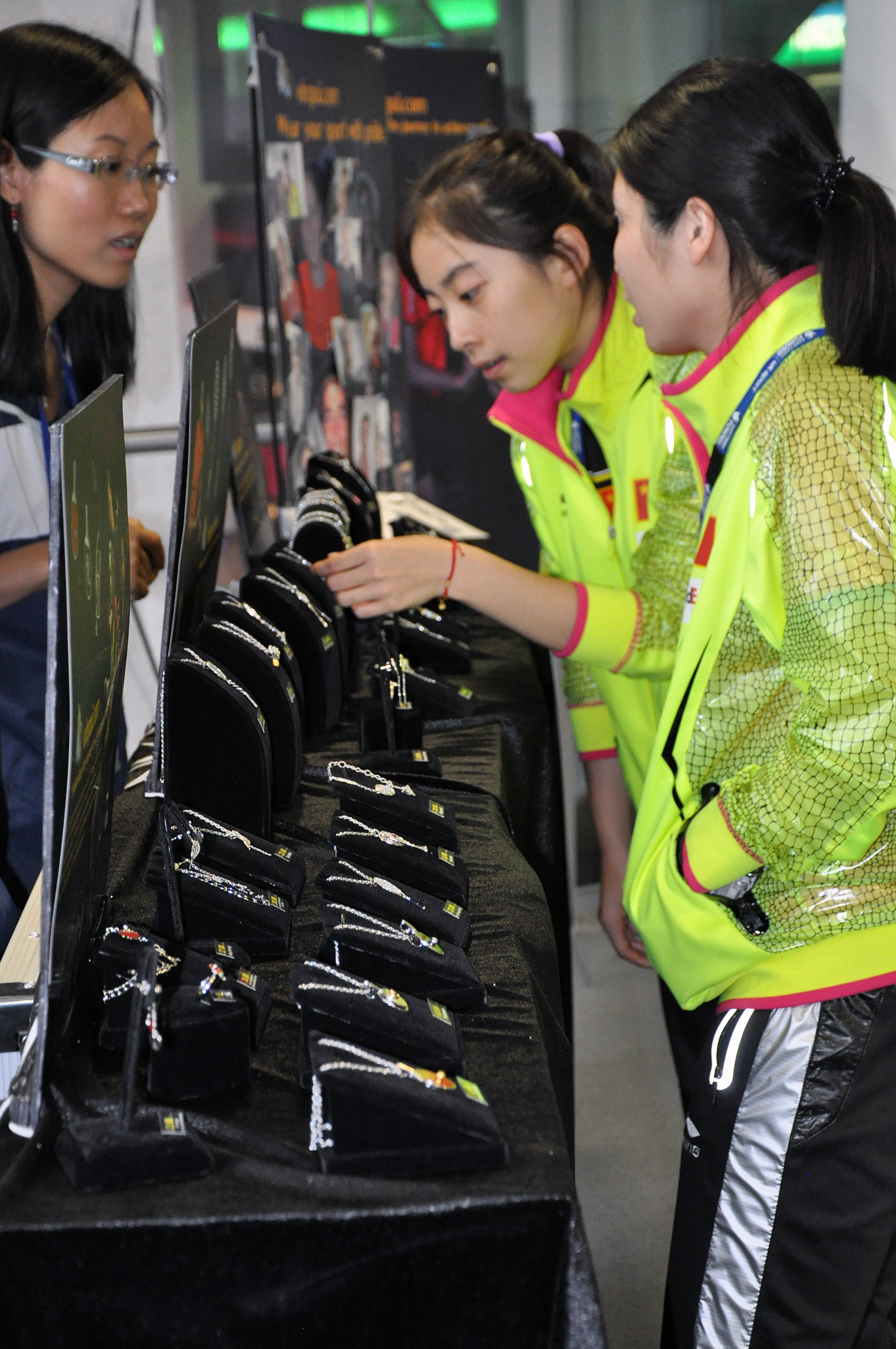

Personal information
- Born: 26 June 1986 (age 40) Changzhou, China
- Height: 1.67 m (5 ft 6 in)
- Weight: 55 kg (121 lb)

Sport
- Country: China
- Sport: Badminton
- Handedness: Left

Women's singles
- Highest ranking: 3 (11 March 2010)
- BWF profile
Medal record
Women's badminton
Representing China
World Cup
| Bronze medal – third place | 2006 Yiyang | Women's singles |
Uber Cup
| Gold medal – first place | 2008 Jakarta | Women's team |
| Gold medal – first place | 2006 Sendai & Tokyo | Women's team |
| Silver medal – second place | 2010 Kuala Lumpur | Women's team |
Asian Games
| Gold medal – first place | 2010 Guangzhou | Women's team |
Asian Championships
| Gold medal – first place | 2007 Johor Bahru | Women's singles |
| Gold medal – first place | 2008 Johor Bahru | Women's singles |
| Bronze medal – third place | 2006 Johor Bahru | Women's singles |
| Bronze medal – third place | 2011 Chengdu | Women's singles |
World Junior Championships
| Gold medal – first place | 2002 Pretoria | Girls' singles |
| Gold medal – first place | 2002 Pretoria | Mixed team |
| Gold medal – first place | 2004 Richmond | Mixed team |
Asian Junior Championships
| Gold medal – first place | 2002 Kuala Lumpur | Girls' team |
| Gold medal – first place | 2004 Hwacheon | Girls' singles |
| Gold medal – first place | 2004 Hwacheon | Girls' team |
| Silver medal – second place | 2002 Kuala Lumpur | Girls' singles |

Jiang Yanjiao (simplified Chinese: 蒋燕皎; traditional Chinese: 蔣燕皎; pinyin: Jiǎng Yànjiǎo; born 26 June 1986), is a Chinese badminton player from Changzhou. She graduated from the Huaqiao University.

== Career ==
A winner of both the BWF World Junior Championships (2002) and the Asian Junior Championships (2004), Jiang has since emerged as one of the world's leading women's singles players. She won the Chinese national title in 2005, the Denmark Open in 2006, the Asian Championships in both 2007 and 2008, and the China Open in 2008. Jiang played singles for China's world champion Uber Cup (women's international) teams of 2006 and 2008.

As one of several Chinese women's singles players who rate among the world's best, Jiang has been excluded from some international competitions which set a maximum number of participants from any one country. For example, at the 2008 Olympic Games in Beijing neither Jiang nor reigning world champion Zhu Lin were entered in the women's singles event which limited the strongest badminton nations to three competitors.

== Achievements ==
=== World Cup ===
Women's singles
| Year | Venue | Opponent | Score | Result |
|---|---|---|---|---|
| 2006 | Olympic Park; Yiyang, China | (China) Xie Xingfang | 21–16, 19–21, 18–21 | Bronze |

=== Asian Championships ===
Women's singles
| Year | Venue | Opponent | Score | Result |
|---|---|---|---|---|
| 2006 | Bandaraya Stadium; Johor Bahru, Malaysia | (Hong Kong) Wang Chen | 17–21, 18–21 | Bronze |
| 2007 | Bandaraya Stadium, Johor Bahru, Malaysia | (China) Lu Lan | 25–23, 23–21 | Gold |
| 2008 | Bandaraya Stadium, Johor Bahru, Malaysia | (China) Wang Lin | 18–21, 21–18, 21–13 | Gold |
| 2011 | Sichuan Gymnasium; Chengdu, China | (China) Lu Lan | 18–21, 23–25 | Bronze |

=== World Junior Championships ===
Girls' singles
| Year | Venue | Opponent | Score | Result |
|---|---|---|---|---|
| 2002 | Pretoria Showgrounds; Pretoria, South Africa | (South Korea) Seo Yoon-hee | 11–0, 8–11, 11–3 | Gold |

=== Asian Junior Championships ===
Girls' singles
| Year | Venue | Opponent | Score | Result |
|---|---|---|---|---|
| 2002 | Kuala Lumpur Badminton Stadium; Kuala Lumpur, Malaysia | (China) Zhu Lin | 3–11, 6–11 | Silver |
| 2004 | Hwacheon Indoor Stadium; Hwacheon, South Korea | (China) Lu Lan | 11–9, 11–2 | Gold |

=== BWF Superseries ===
The BWF Superseries has two level such as Superseries and Superseries Premier. A season of Superseries features twelve tournaments around the world, which introduced since 2011, with successful players invited to the Superseries Finals held at the year end.

Women's singles
| Year | Tournament | Opponent | Score | Result |
|---|---|---|---|---|
| 2008 | China Open | (China) Zhu Jingjing | 21–15, 21–13 | (gold) Winner |
| 2009 | Swiss Open | (China) Wang Yihan | 17–21, 21–17, 13–21 | (silver) Runner-up |
| 2009 | Hong Kong Open | (China) Wang Shixian | 13–21, 15–21 | (silver) Runner-up |
| 2009 | China Open | (China) Wang Xin | 21–19, 22–20 | (gold) Winner |
| 2010 | Swiss Open | (China) Wang Shixian | 15–21, 19–21 | (silver) Runner-up |
| 2010 | Japan Open | (China) Wang Xin | 23–21, 21–18 | (gold) Winner |
| 2010 | China Open | (China) Wang Shixian | 21–16, 21–19 | (gold) Winner |
| 2011 | China Masters | (China) Wang Shixian | 16–21, 5–8 retired | (silver) Runner-up |
| 2012 | Korea Open | (China) Wang Shixian | 12–21, 17–21 | (silver) Runner-up |
| 2012 | China Masters | (China) Wang Yihan | 18–21, 14–21 | (silver) Runner-up |

BWF Super Series Finals tournament
BWF Super Series Premier tournament
BWF Super Series tournament

=== BWF Grand Prix ===
The BWF Grand Prix has two level such as Grand Prix and Grand Prix Gold. It is a series of badminton tournaments, sanctioned by Badminton World Federation (BWF) since 2007. The World Badminton Grand Prix sanctioned by International Badminton Federation (IBF) since 1983.

Women's singles
| Year | Tournament | Opponent | Score | Result |
|---|---|---|---|---|
| 2006 | Denmark Open | (China) Lu Lan | 21–14, 21–14 | (gold) Winner |
| 2009 | Macau Open | (China) Wang Yihan | 21–16, 20–22, 12–21 | (silver) Runner-up |
| 2011 | Thailand Open | (China) Li Xuerui | 21–14, 14–21, 14–21 | (silver) Runner-up |

BWF Grand Prix Gold tournament
BWF Grand Prix tournament

== Record against selected opponents ==
Record against Year-end Finals finalists, World Championships semi-finalists, and Olympic quarter-finalists.

| Players | Matches | Results | | Difference |
| Players | Matches | Won | Lost | Difference |
|---|---|---|---|---|
| (Bulgaria) Petya Nedelcheva | 6 | 5 | 1 | +4 |
| (China) Li Xuerui | 3 | 0 | 3 | –3 |
| (China) Lu Lan | 8 | 5 | 3 | +2 |
| (China) Wang Lin | 4 | 2 | 2 | 0 |
| (China) Wang Shixian | 11 | 5 | 6 | –1 |
| (China) Wang Xin | 7 | 3 | 4 | –1 |
| (China) Wang Yihan | 14 | 5 | 9 | –4 |
| (China) Xie Xingfang | 6 | 2 | 4 | –2 |
| (China) Zhang Ning | 5 | 0 | 5 | –5 |
| (China) Zhu Lin | 4 | 2 | 2 | 0 |
| (Chinese Taipei) Cheng Shao-chieh | 2 | 1 | 1 | 0 |
| (Chinese Taipei) Tai Tzu-ying | 3 | 3 | 0 | +3 |
| (Denmark) Tine Baun | 2 | 0 | 2 | –2 |
| (Germany) Petra Overzier | 1 | 0 | 1 | –1 |
| (Germany) Juliane Schenk | 6 | 2 | 4 | –2 |

| Players | Matches | Results | | Difference |
| Players | Matches | Won | Lost | Difference |
|---|---|---|---|---|
| (Germany) Xu Huaiwen | 2 | 2 | 0 | +2 |
| (France) Pi Hongyan | 6 | 5 | 1 | +4 |
| (Hong Kong) Wang Chen | 8 | 4 | 4 | 0 |
| (Hong Kong) Yip Pui Yin | 6 | 6 | 0 | +6 |
| (Hong Kong) Zhou Mi | 3 | 0 | 3 | –3 |
| (India) Saina Nehwal | 5 | 5 | 0 | +5 |
| (India) P. V. Sindhu | 2 | 2 | 0 | +2 |
| (Indonesia) Lindaweni Fanetri | 1 | 1 | 0 | +1 |
| (Japan) Minatsu Mitani | 1 | 0 | 1 | –1 |
| (Malaysia) Wong Mew Choo | 4 | 3 | 1 | +2 |
| (Netherlands) Mia Audina | 2 | 0 | 2 | –2 |
| (South Korea) Bae Yeon-ju | 3 | 3 | 0 | +3 |
| (South Korea) Sung Ji-hyun | 5 | 1 | 4 | –3 |
| (Thailand) Porntip Buranaprasertsuk | 2 | 2 | 0 | +2 |
| (Thailand) Ratchanok Intanon | 3 | 3 | 0 | +3 |
