= Ai Goto =

Japanese badminton player

Personal information
- Born: 20 October 1983 (age 43) Gifu Prefecture, Japan
- Height: 1.52 m (5 ft 0 in)
- Weight: 51 kg (112 lb)

Sport
- Country: Japan
- Sport: Badminton
- Handedness: Right

Women's singles
- Highest ranking: 17 (November, 2010)
- BWF profile
Medal record
Women's badminton
Representing Japan
Uber Cup
Bronze medal – third place	2010 Kuala Lumpur	Women's team
Bronze medal – third place	2012 Wuhan	Women's team

Ai Goto (後藤 愛, Gotō Ai; born 20 October 1983) is a Japanese badminton player who is a singles specialist. Now she works at the human resources department NTT East badminton club. She was the women's singles champion at the 2009 Osaka International tournament. At the BWF Grand Prix tournament, she was a semifinalist at the 2010 Dutch Open, 2011 Russian Open, and at the 2011 Indonesia Masters. Goto also competed at the 2010 Asian Games in Guangzhou, China.

== Achievements ==
=== BWF International Challenge/Series ===
Women's singles
Year	Tournament	Opponent	Score	Result	Ref.
2009	Osaka International	(South Korea) Kim Moon-hi	21–14, 21–14	(gold) Winner	
2012	Polish International	(Turkey) Neslihan Yigit	21–9, 12–21, 21–7	(gold) Winner	
2012	Peru International	(Canada) Michelle Li	23–21, 14–21, 15–21	(silver) Runner-up	

BWF International Challenge tournament
BWF International Series tournament
