= Yip Pui Yin =

Hong Kong badminton player

Yip Pui Yin 葉姵延
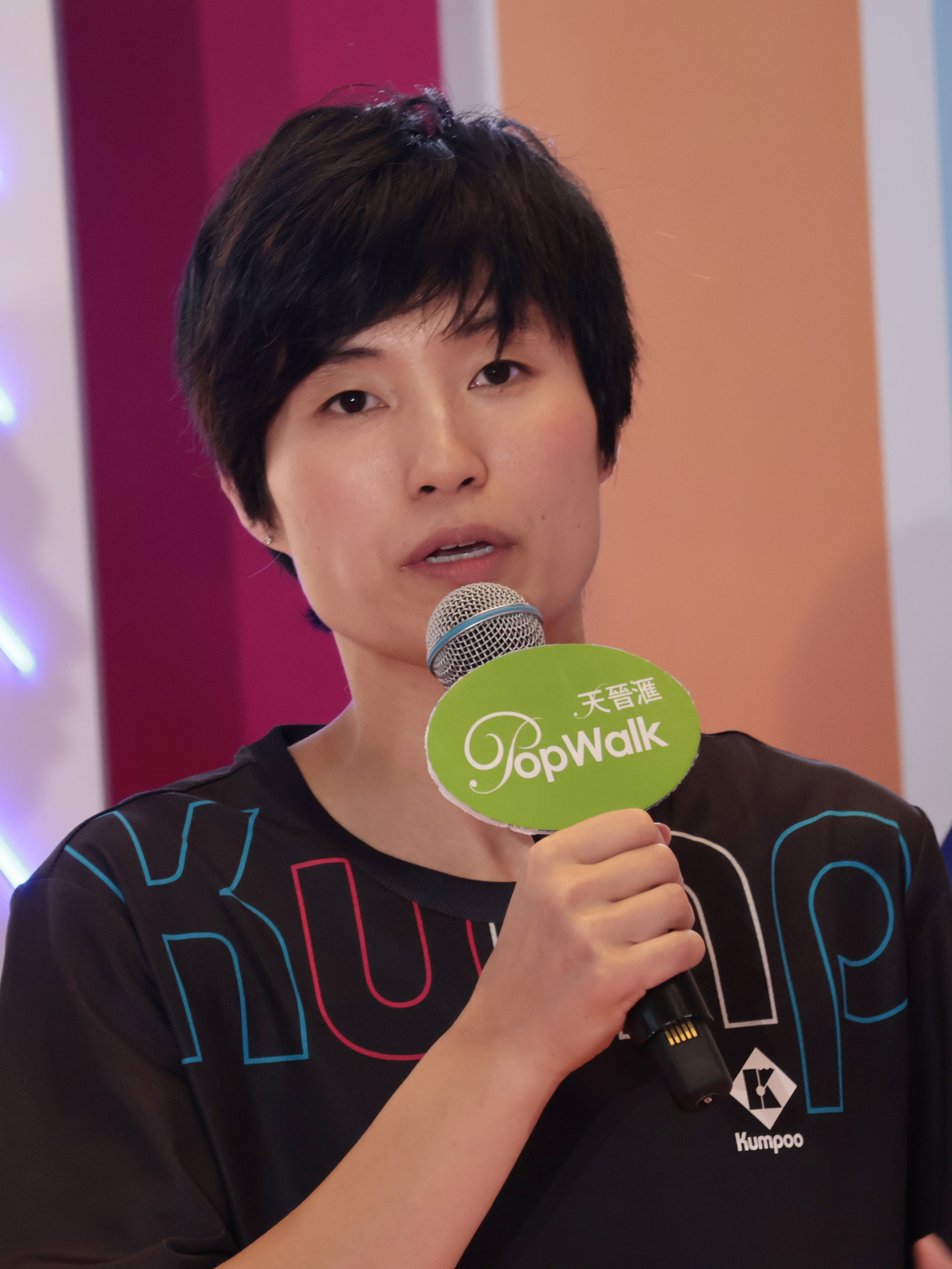
- Yip in 2024

Personal information
- Born: 6 August 1987 (age 39) Hong Kong
- Height: 1.64 m (5 ft 5 in)
- Weight: 59 kg (130 lb)

Sport
- Country: Hong Kong
- Sport: Badminton
- Handedness: Right
- Coached by: Wang Chen

Women's singles
- Highest ranking: 8 (13 January 2011)
- BWF profile
Medal record
Women's badminton
Representing Hong Kong
Asian Games
Silver medal – second place	2006 Doha	Women's singles
Bronze medal – third place	2010 Guangzhou	Women's singles
Asian Championships
Bronze medal – third place	2008 Johor Bahru	Women's singles
Asia Mixed Team Championships
Bronze medal – third place	2019 Hong Kong	Mixed team
East Asian Games
Gold medal – first place	2009 Hong Kong	Women's singles
Bronze medal – third place	2009 Hong Kong	Women's team
Bronze medal – third place	2013 Tianjin	Women's team
Asian Junior Championships
Bronze medal – third place	2005 Jakarta	Girls' singles
Bronze medal – third place	2005 Jakarta	Girls' doubles

Yip Pui Yin (Chinese: 葉姵延; Jyutping: jip^{6} bui^{6} jin^{4}; born 6 August 1987) is a badminton player from Hong Kong.

== Career ==
Yip played at the 2005 World Badminton Championships in Anaheim. In the women's singles event she reached the third round after beating Laura Molina of Spain and Kanako Yonekura (11th seed) in round one and round two respectively. In the third round she was beaten by the 1st seed and reigning world champion Zhang Ning of China.

She won the silver medal in the 2006 Asian Games after losing to fellow Hong Kong player Wang Chen in the final. In 2007, she played at the World Championships and was defeated in the third round by Zhu Lin, of China, 9–21, 21–16, 14–21. Yip made her first appearance at the 2008 Summer Olympics. In 2009, she won the gold medal in the 2009 East Asian Games when her opponent Zhou Mi retired halfway through the deciding set. She won 15–21, 21–13, 17–10.

At the 2012 London Olympics, Yip won against eighth seed Sung Ji-hyun, of South Korea, in the group stage. Then Yip went through to the final eight of the women's singles in badminton after she beat France's 16th seed Pi Hongyan by two games to one, winning 13–21, 21–13, 21–16. Yip faced China's Li Xuerui, who beat her two games to one. Her performance equalled the best performance by a Hong Kong shuttler at the Olympic Games.

== Achievements ==
=== Asian Games ===
Women's singles
Year	Venue	Opponent	Score	Result
2006	Aspire Hall 3, Doha, Qatar	(Hong Kong) Wang Chen	14–21, 20–22	Silver
2010	Tianhe Gymnasium, Guangzhou, China	(China) Wang Shixian	14–21, 14–21	Bronze

=== Asian Championships ===
Women's singles
Year	Venue	Opponent	Score	Result
2008	Bandaraya Stadium, Johor Bahru, Malaysia	(China) Wang Lin	14–21, 18–21	Bronze

=== East Asian Games ===
Women's singles
Year	Venue	Opponent	Score	Result
2009	Queen Elizabeth Stadium, Hong Kong	(Hong Kong) Zhou Mi	15–21, 21–13, 17–10 retired	Gold

=== Asian Junior Championships ===
Girls' singles
Year	Venue	Opponent	Score	Result
2005	Tennis Indoor Senayan, Jakarta, Indonesia	(China) Wang Lin	5–11, 7–11	Bronze

Girls' doubles
Year	Venue	Partner	Opponent	Score	Result
2005	Tennis Indoor Senayan, Jakarta, Indonesia	(Hong Kong) Lam Sin Ying	(South Korea) Ha Jung-eun (South Korea) Hong Soo-jung	7–15, 7–15	Bronze

=== BWF Grand Prix ===
The BWF Grand Prix had two levels, the BWF Grand Prix and Grand Prix Gold. It was a series of badminton tournaments sanctioned by the Badminton World Federation (BWF) which was held from 2007 to 2017. The World Badminton Grand Prix sanctioned by International Badminton Federation (IBF) from 1983 to 2006.

Women's singles
Year	Tournament	Opponent	Score	Result
2006	Macau Open	(Netherlands) Judith Meulendijks	21–18, 10–21, 10–21	(silver) Runner-up
2009	Australian Open	(Indonesia) Maria Febe Kusumastuti	18–21, 19–21	(silver) Runner-up
2010	Malaysia Grand Prix Gold	(Hong Kong) Zhou Mi	21–16, 14–21, 21–19	(gold) Winner
2013	Canada Open	(Thailand) Nichaon Jindapon	18–21, 16–21	(silver) Runner-up

BWF Grand Prix Gold tournament
BWF Grand Prix tournament

== Record against selected opponents ==
Record against year-end Finals finalists, World Championships semi-finalists, and Olympic quarter-finalists. Accurate as of 17 December 2021.

Players	Matches	Results		Difference
Players	Matches	Won	Lost	Difference
(Australia) Huang Chia-chi	1	1	0	+1
(Bulgaria) Petya Nedelcheva	3	2	1	+1
(China) Chen Yufei	2	0	2	–2
(China) He Bingjiao	4	0	4	–4
(China) Li Xuerui	10	0	10	–10
(China) Lu Lan	4	1	3	–2
(China) Wang Lin	8	3	5	–2
(China) Wang Shixian	10	0	10	–10
(China) Wang Xin	2	0	2	–2
(China) Wang Yihan	9	3	6	–3
(China) Xie Xingfang	4	1	3	–2
(China) Zhang Yiman	1	0	1	–1
(China) Zhang Ning	5	1	4	–3

Players	Matches	Results		Difference
Players	Matches	Won	Lost	Difference
(China) Zhu Lin	5	2	3	–1
(Chinese Taipei) Cheng Shao-chieh	4	3	1	+2
(Chinese Taipei) Tai Tzu-ying	10	1	9	–8
(Denmark) Tine Baun	5	1	4	–3
(England) Tracey Hallam	3	2	1	+1
(France) Pi Hongyan	6	2	4	–2
(Germany) Juliane Schenk	8	3	5	–2
(Germany) Xu Huaiwen	2	1	1	0
(Hong Kong) Wang Chen	1	0	1	–1
(Hong Kong) Zhou Mi	4	2	2	0
(India) Saina Nehwal	11	2	9	–7
(India) P. V. Sindhu	4	0	4	–4
(Indonesia) Lindaweni Fanetri	2	1	1	0

Players	Matches	Results		Difference
Players	Matches	Won	Lost	Difference
(Indonesia) Maria Kristin Yulianti	2	1	1	0
(Japan) Minatsu Mitani	3	1	2	–1
(Japan) Nozomi Okuhara	6	1	5	–4
(Japan) Akane Yamaguchi	4	0	4	–4
(Malaysia) Wong Mew Choo	1	0	1	–1
(Netherlands) Mia Audina	1	0	1	–1
(South Korea) An Se-young	1	0	1	–1
(South Korea) Bae Yeon-ju	5	2	3	–1
(South Korea) Sung Ji-hyun	11	3	8	–5
(Spain) Carolina Marín	5	0	5	–5
(Thailand) Porntip Buranaprasertsuk	7	3	4	–1
(Thailand) Ratchanok Intanon	17	3	14	–11
