= Tianhe Gymnasium =

Sports venue in Guangzhou, China

The Tianhe Gymnasium of Tianhe Sports Center is a sports venue in Tianhe District, Guangzhou.

It hosted badminton events during the 2010 Asian Games.

On 23 April 2019, the Tianhe Sports Center and Guangzhou Loong Lions finished the hand-over ceremony of Tianhe Gymnasium. Nenking and the Loong Lions officially started their operation on the gymnasium since 1 May 2019.

== See also ==
- List of indoor arenas in China
