= 2010 Korea Open Super Series =

Tournament details
- Dates: 12–17 January 2010
- Edition: 19th
- Level: Super Series
- Total prize money: US$300,000
- Venue: SK Olympic Handball Gymnasium
- Location: Seoul, South Korea

Champions
- Men's singles: (Malaysia) Lee Chong Wei
- Women's singles: (China) Wang Shixian
- Men's doubles: (South Korea) Jung Jae-sung (South Korea) Lee Yong-dae
- Women's doubles: (China) Cheng Shu (China) Zhao Yunlei
- Mixed doubles: (China) He Hanbin (China) Yu Yang

The 2010 Korea Open Super Series was a badminton tournament which took place at SK Olympic Handball Gymnasium in Seoul, South Korea from 12 to 17 January 2010. It had a total purse of US$300,000, as the biggest prize money of Super Series event of the year.

The 2010 Korea Open Super Series became the first tournament of the 2010 BWF Super Series, and was the nineteenth edition of the Korea Open tournament, which had been held since 1991. This tournament was organized by Badminton Korea Association and sanctioned by the BWF.

== Men's singles ==
=== Seeds ===
1. (Malaysia) Lee Chong Wei (champion)
2. (Denmark) Peter Gade (final)
3. (China) Chen Jin (semi-finals)
4. (China) Bao Chunlai (quarter-finals)
5. (South Korea) Park Sung-hwan (quarter-finals)
6. (Vietnam) Nguyen Tien Minh (quarter-finals)
7. (China) Chen Long (semi-finals)
8. (Thailand) Boonsak Ponsana (quarter-finals)

=== Finals ===
Semifinals
1 | (Malaysia) Lee Chong Wei | 21 | 21
3 | (China) Chen Jin | 11 | 13
7 | (China) Chen Long | 13 | 21 | 17
2 | (Denmark) Peter Gade | 21 | 10 | 21

Final
1 | (Malaysia) Lee Chong Wei | 21 | 21
2 | (Denmark) Peter Gade | 12 | 11

=== Top half ===
==== Section 1 ====
First Round
1 | (Malaysia) Lee C W | 21 | 21
(England) A Smith | 4 | 14
(Germany) M Zwiebler | 21 | 21
(Poland) P Wacha | 11 | 16
8 | (Thailand) B Ponsana | 21 | 21
(Hong Kong) Hu Y | 17 | 11
PFQ | (South Korea) Hong J-h | 13 | 21 | 21
(Japan) S Sasaki | 21 | 17 | 14

Second Round
1 | (Malaysia) Lee C W | 21 | 21
(Germany) M Zwiebler | 18 | 8
8 | (Thailand) B Ponsana | 21 | 21
PFQ | (South Korea) Hong J-h | 18 | 16

Quarter-finals
1 | (Malaysia) Lee C W | 21 | 21
8 | (Thailand) B Ponsana | 14 | 10

==== Section 2 ====
First Round
3 | (China) Chen J | 21 | 21
(Chinese Taipei) Hsueh H-y | 8 | 10
(Netherlands) D Palyama | 21 | 19 | 21
(South Korea) Shon W-h | 14 | 21 | 17
6 | (Vietnam) Nguyen T M | 22 | 21
(Denmark) J Persson | 20 | 16
(China) Du PY | 21 | 21
Q | (Malaysia) Tan C S | 15 | 16

Second Round
3 | (China) Chen J | 21 | 21
(Netherlands) D Palyama | 14 | 17
6 | (Vietnam) Nguyen T M | 25 | 15 | 21
(China) Du PY | 23 | 21 | 19

Quarter-finals
3 | (China) Chen J | 21 | 21
6 | (Vietnam) Nguyen T M | 7 | 19

=== Bottom half ===
==== Section 3 ====
First Round
(Japan) K Yamada | 21 | 22
PFQ | (Hong Kong) Wong W K | 15 | 20
(Hong Kong) Chan Y K | 19 | 22 | 9
7 | (China) Chen L | 21 | 20 | 21
(England) C Baxter | 21 | 21
(Thailand) T Saensomboonsuk | 8 | 17
Q | (South Korea) Kim S-r | 21 | 13 | 8
4 | (China) Bao CL | 15 | 21 | 21

Second Round
(Japan) K Yamada | 17 | 12
7 | (China) Chen L | 21 | 21
(England) C Baxter | 17 | 18
4 | (China) Bao CL | 21 | 21

Quarter-finals
7 | (China) Chen L | w | / | o
4 | (China) Bao CL

==== Section 4 ====
First Round
Q | (South Korea) Jang Y-s | 23 | 21 | 16
(Malaysia) Kuan B H | 25 | 18 | 21
Q | (South Korea) Lee C-h | 17 | 15
5 | (South Korea) Park S-h | 21 | 21
(Netherlands) E Pang | 22 | 9 | 16
(England) R Ouseph | 20 | 21 | 21
(Malaysia) Chong W F | 19 | 17
2 | (Denmark) P Gade | 21 | 21

Second Round
(Malaysia) Kuan B H | 15 | 14
5 | (South Korea) Park S-h | 21 | 21
(England) R Ouseph | 21 | 20
2 | (Denmark) P Gade | 23 | 22

Quarter-finals
5 | (South Korea) Park S-h | 21 | 16 | 20
2 | (Denmark) P Gade | 17 | 21 | 22

== Women's singles ==
=== Seeds ===
1. (Denmark) Tine Rasmussen (second round)
2. (Hong Kong) Zhou Mi (quarter-finals)
3. (China) Lu Lan (withdrew)
4. (Germany) Juliane Schenk (second round)
5. (China) Wang Xin (second round)
6. (China) Wang Shixian (champion)
7. (Netherlands) Yao Jie (quarter-finals)
8. (Thailand) Salakjit Ponsana (first round)

=== Finals ===
Semifinals
(South Korea) Sung Ji-hyun | 21 | 17 | 21
(South Korea) Bae Seung-hee | 18 | 21 | 9
(South Korea) Kim Moon-hi | 17 | 20
6 | (China) Wang Shixian | 21 | 22

Final
(South Korea) Sung Ji-hyun | 10 | 23
6 | (China) Wang Shixian | 21 | 25

=== Top half ===
==== Section 1 ====
First Round
1 | (Denmark) T Rasmussen | 21 | 21
(Japan) S Sato | 14 | 16
(Japan) E Hirose | 20 | 13
(South Korea) Sung J-h | 22 | 21
7 | (Netherlands) Yao J | 21 | 21
(South Korea) Jang S-y | 13 | 14
(Japan) Y Hirayama | 16 | 22 | 21
(Chinese Taipei) Hsu Y-c | 21 | 20 | 11

Second Round
1 | (Denmark) T Rasmussen | 15 | 16
(South Korea) Sung J-h | 21 | 21
7 | (Netherlands) Yao J | 21 | 20 | 21
(Japan) Y Hirayama | 16 | 22 | 19

Quarter-finals
(South Korea) Sung J-h | 21 | 21
7 | (Netherlands) Yao J | 17 | 16

==== Section 2 ====
First Round
4 | (Germany) J Schenk | 15 | 21 | 21
(South Korea) Bae Y-j | 21 | 17 | 19
(South Korea) Yang R-s | 12 | 10
(Hong Kong) Yip P Y | 21 | 21
5 | (China) Wang X | 21 | 21
(Netherlands) R v Cutsen | 13 | 13
(South Korea) Bae S-h | 21 | 21
(Bulgaria) L Zechiri | 14 | 12

Second Round
4 | (Germany) J Schenk | 21 | 16 | 18
(Hong Kong) Yip P Y | 4 | 21 | 21
5 | (China) Wang X | 12 | 14
(South Korea) Bae S-h | 21 | 21

Quarter-finals
(Hong Kong) Yip P Y | 19 | 10
(South Korea) Bae S-h | 21 | 21

=== Bottom half ===
==== Section 3 ====
First Round
(South Korea) Kim M-h | 21 | 21
PFQ | (Chinese Taipei) Chang H-y | 7 | 9
PFQ | (South Korea) Kang H-w | 21 | 6 | 25
8 | (Thailand) S Ponsana | 11 | 21 | 23
(Bulgaria) P Nedelcheva | 21 | 16 | 21
Q | (South Korea) Joo E-e | 18 | 21 | 16
(Hong Kong) Chan T K | 21 | 22
PFQ | (South Korea) Kwon H-s | 19 | 20

Second Round
(South Korea) Kim M-h | 21 | 21
PFQ | (South Korea) Kang H-w | 15 | 17
(Bulgaria) P Nedelcheva | 9 | 21 | 19
(Hong Kong) Chan T K | 21 | 13 | 21

Quarter-finals
(South Korea) Kim M-h | 21 | 21
(Hong Kong) Chan T K | 13 | 10

==== Section 4 ====
First Round
(Finland) A Nieminen | 21 | 17 | 21
(Netherlands) J Meulendijks | 13 | 21 | 13
Q | (South Korea) Lee Y-h | 17 | 9
6 | (China) Wang SX | 21 | 21
Q | (South Korea) Choi H-i | 19 | 15
(Chinese Taipei) Tai T-y | 21 | 21
(Malaysia) Wong M C | 21 | 10 | 11
2 | (Hong Kong) Zhou M | 10 | 21 | 21

Second Round
(Finland) A Nieminen | 14 | 10
6 | (China) Wang SX | 21 | 21
(Chinese Taipei) Tai T-y | 23 | 16 | 10
2 | (Hong Kong) Zhou M | 21 | 21 | 21

Quarter-finals
6 | (China) Wang SX | 21 | 14
2 | (Hong Kong) Zhou M | 18 | 9^{r}

== Men's doubles ==
=== Seeds ===
1. (South Korea) Jung Jae-sung / Lee Yong-dae (champion)
2. (Denmark) Mathias Boe / Carsten Mogensen (quarter-finals)
3. (Indonesia) Alvent Yulianto Chandra / Hendra Aprida Gunawan (quarter-finals)
4. (Denmark) Lars Paaske / Jonas Rasmussen (second round)
5. (China) Cai Yun / Fu Haifeng (final)
6. (China) Xu Chen / Guo Zhendong (second round)
7. (United States) Howard Bach / Tony Gunawan (first round)
8. (Malaysia) Gan Teik Chai / Tan Bin Shen (first round)

=== Finals ===
Semi-finals
1 | (South Korea) Jung Jae-sung (South Korea) Lee Yong-dae | 21 | 22
(China) Chai Biao (China) Zhang Nan | 16 | 20
(Japan) Hiroyuki Endo (Japan) Yoshiteru Hirobe | 15 | 14
5 | (China) Cai Yun (China) Fu Haifeng | 21 | 21

Final
1 | (South Korea) Jung Jae-sung (South Korea) Lee Yong-dae | 21 | 14 | 21
5 | (China) Cai Yun (China) Fu Haifeng | 11 | 21 | 18

=== Top half ===
==== Section 1 ====
First Round
(Chinese Taipei) Hsueh H-y (Chinese Taipei) Lu C-y | 21 | 14
(South Korea) Jin Y-h (South Korea) Kim D-s | 23 | 21
6 | (China) Guo ZD (China) Xu C | 21 | 21
(South Korea) Choi S-i (South Korea) Kang J-w | 11 | 15
(South Korea) Kim K-j (South Korea) Shin B-c | 21 | 21
(Japan) N Kawamae (Japan) S Sato | 10 | 14

Second Round
1 | (South Korea) Jung J-s (South Korea) Lee Y-d | 21 | 21
(South Korea) Jin Y-h (South Korea) Kim D-s | 13 | 9
6 | (China) Guo ZD (China) Xu C | 21 | 20 | 19
(South Korea) Kim K-j (South Korea) Shin B-c | 12 | 22 | 21

Quarter-finals
1 | (South Korea) Jung J-s (South Korea) Lee Y-d | 21 | 22
(South Korea) Kim K-j (South Korea) Shin B-c | 14 | 20

==== Section 2 ====
First Round
4 | (Denmark) L Paaske (Denmark) J Rasmussen | 21 | 21
(South Korea) Choi Y-h (South Korea) Jang S-h | 14 | 14
(China) Chai B (China) Zhang N | 22 | 21
(England) C Adcock (England) R Blair | 20 | 16
7 | (United States) H Bach (United States) T Gunawan | 13 | 16
(South Korea) Ko S-h (South Korea) Yoo Y-s | 21 | 21
(Japan) H Hashimoto (Japan) N Hirata
(Netherlands) R Bosch (Netherlands) K Ridder | w | / | d

Second Round
4 | (Denmark) L Paaske (Denmark) J Rasmussen | 14 | 24 | 10
(China) Chai B (China) Zhang N | 21 | 22 | 21
(South Korea) Ko S-h (South Korea) Yoo Y-s | 21 | 21
(Japan) H Hashimoto (Japan) N Hirata | 15 | 13

Quarter-finals
(China) Chai B (China) Zhang N | 21 | 17 | 21
(South Korea) Ko S-h (South Korea) Yoo Y-s | 12 | 21 | 14

=== Bottom half ===
==== Section 3 ====
First Round
(Japan) H Endo (Japan) Y Hirobe | 21 | 21
(Germany) I Kindervater (Germany) J Schöttler | 12 | 11
(Chinese Taipei) Fang C-m (Chinese Taipei) Lee S-m | 21 | 21
8 | (Malaysia) Gan T C (Malaysia) Tan B S | 19 | 16
(France) B Carême (France) S Grosjean | 20 | 21 | 19
(Thailand) S Anugritayawon (Thailand) S Prapakamol | 22 | 13 | 21
(Japan) K Kazuno (Japan) K Hayakawa | 15 | 13
3 | (Indonesia) A Yulianto Chandra (Indonesia) H A Gunawan | 21 | 21

Second Round
(Japan) H Endo (Japan) Y Hirobe | 14 | 21 | 21
(Chinese Taipei) Fang C-m (Chinese Taipei) Lee S-m | 21 | 15 | 19
(Thailand) S Anugritayawon (Thailand) S Prapakamol | 13 | 28 | 20
3 | (Indonesia) A Yulianto Chandra (Indonesia) H A Gunawan | 21 | 26 | 22

Quarter-finals
(Japan) H Endo (Japan) Y Hirobe | 21 | 21
3 | (Indonesia) A Yulianto Chandra (Indonesia) H A Gunawan | 14 | 7

==== Section 4 ====
First Round
(South Korea) Choi Y-w (South Korea) Jun Y-h | w | / | d
(Denmark) K F Henriksen (Denmark) A Kristiansen
(South Korea) Cho G-w (South Korea) Kwon Y-g | 17 | 11
5 | (China) Cai Y (China) Fu HF | 21 | 21
(Canada) Lee H H (Canada) T Ng | 21 | 13 | 21
(South Korea) Chung E-s (South Korea) Kim D-e | 19 | 21 | 23

Second Round
(Denmark) K F Henriksen (Denmark) A Kristiansen | 10 | 7
5 | (China) Cai Y (China) Fu HF | 21 | 21
(South Korea) Chung E-s (South Korea) Kim D-e | 18 | 12
2 | (Denmark) M Boe (Denmark) C Mogensen | 21 | 21

Quarter-finals
5 | (China) Cai Y (China) Fu HF | 21 | 15 | 21
2 | (Denmark) M Boe (Denmark) C Mogensen | 16 | 21 | 18

== Women's doubles ==
=== Seeds ===
1. (China) Cheng Shu / Zhao Yunlei (champion)
2. (Japan) Mizuki Fujii / Reika Kakiiwa (final)
3. (Thailand) Duanganong Aroonkesorn / Kunchala Voravichitchaikul (quarter-finals)
4. (Japan) Miyuki Maeda / Satoko Suetsuna (withdrew)
5. (Bulgaria) Petya Nedeltcheva / (Russia) Anastasia Russkikh (second round)
6. (Japan) Misaki Matsutomo / Ayaka Takahashi (quarter-finals)
7. (Thailand) Savitree Amitapai / Vacharaporn Munkit (second round)
8. (France) Laura Choinet / Weny Rahmawati (second round)

=== Finals ===
Semi-finals
1 | (China) Cheng Shu (China) Zhao Yunlei | 21 | 21
(South Korea) Ha Jung-eun (South Korea) Lee Kyung-won | 5 | 14
(South Korea) Jung Kyung-eun (South Korea) Yoo Hyun-young | 21 | 17 | 14
2 | (Japan) Mizuki Fujii (Japan) Reika Kakiiwa | 14 | 21 | 21

Final
1 | (China) Cheng Shu (China) Zhao Yunlei | 21 | 21
2 | (Japan) Mizuki Fujii (Japan) Reika Kakiiwa | 16 | 15

=== Top half ===
==== Section 1 ====
First Round
(Chinese Taipei) Chang H-y (Chinese Taipei) Cheng S-c | w | / | d
(South Korea) Lee S-r (South Korea) Oh B-k
(South Korea) Kim H-n (South Korea) Sun I-j | 18 | 15
(Japan) S Matsuo (Japan) M Naito | 21 | 21

Second Round
1 | (China) Cheng S (China) Zhao YL | 21 | 21
(South Korea) Lee S-r (South Korea) Oh B-k | 4 | 14
5 | (Bulgaria) P Nedelcheva (Russia) A Russkikh | 11 | 14
(Japan) S Matsuo (Japan) M Naito | 21 | 21

Quarter-finals
1 | (China) Cheng S (China) Zhao YL | 21 | 21
(Japan) S Matsuo (Japan) M Naito | 9 | 17

==== Section 2 ====
First Round
(Netherlands) L Jonathans (Netherlands) P v Dooremalen | 16 | 16
(South Korea) Ha J-e (South Korea) Lee K-w | 21 | 21
(South Korea) Choi H-i (South Korea) Lee S-h | 21 | 15 | 21
(England) J Wallwork (England) G White | 14 | 21 | 11

Second Round
4 | (Japan) M Maeda (Japan) S Suetsuna | w | / | d
(South Korea) Ha J-e (South Korea) Lee K-w
7 | (Thailand) S Amitrapai (Thailand) V Munkit | 22 | 13 | 14
(South Korea) Choi H-i (South Korea) Lee S-h | 20 | 21 | 21

Quarter-finals
(South Korea) Ha J-e (South Korea) Lee K-w | 21 | 21
(South Korea) Choi H-i (South Korea) Lee S-h | 9 | 3

=== Bottom half ===
==== Section 3 ====
First Round
(Chinese Taipei) Chien Y-c (Chinese Taipei) Wang P-r | 15 | 16
(South Korea) Jung K-e (South Korea) Yoo H-y | 21 | 21
(South Korea) Jang Y-n (South Korea) Kim M-y | 1^{r}
(Chinese Taipei) Cheng W-h (Chinese Taipei) Tsai P-l | 5

Second Round
(South Korea) Jung K-e (South Korea) Yoo H-y | 21 | 21
8 | (France) L Choinet (France) W Rahmawati | 14 | 18
(Chinese Taipei) Cheng W-h (Chinese Taipei) Tsai P-l | 14 | 18
3 | (Thailand) D Aroonkesorn (Thailand) K Voravichitchaikul | 21 | 21

Quarter-finals
(South Korea) Jung K-e (South Korea) Yoo H-y | 21 | 21
3 | (Thailand) D Aroonkesorn (Thailand) K Voravichitchaikul | 13 | 17

==== Section 4 ====
First Round
(South Korea) Kang G-h (South Korea) Kim J-w | 15 | 10
(Hong Kong) Chan T K (Hong Kong) Chau H W | 21 | 21
(South Korea) Kim M-j (South Korea) Park S-y | 21 | 21
(Chinese Taipei) Hsu Y-c (Chinese Taipei) Tai T-y | 11 | 11

Second Round
(Hong Kong) Chan T K (Hong Kong) Chau H W | 21 | 19 | 18
6 | (Japan) M Matsutomo (Japan) A Takahashi | 19 | 21 | 21
(South Korea) Kim M-j (South Korea) Park S-y | 11 | 21 | 16
2 | (Japan) M Fujii (Japan) R Kakiiwa | 21 | 14 | 21

Quarter-finals
6 | (Japan) M Matsutomo (Japan) A Takahashi | 13 | 14
2 | (Japan) M Fujii (Japan) R Kakiiwa | 21 | 21

== Mixed doubles ==
=== Seeds ===
1. (South Korea) Lee Yong-dae / Lee Hyo-jung (first round)
2. (Denmark) Joachim Fischer Nielsen / Christinna Pedersen (withdrew)
3. (China) He Hanbin / Yu Yang (champion)
4. (Thailand) Songphon Anugritayawon / Kunchala Voravichitchaikul (quarter-finals)
5. (Poland) Robert Mateusiak / Nadieżda Kostiuczyk (first round)
6. (Thailand) Sudket Prapakamol / Saralee Thoungthongkam (quarter-finals)
7. (Denmark) Thomas Laybourn / Kamilla Rytter Juhl (quarter-finals)
8. (South Korea) Ko Sung-hyun / Ha Jung-eun (quarter-finals)

=== Finals ===
Semi-finals
(China) Tao Jiaming (China) Zhang Yawen | 21 | 21
(Indonesia) Flandy Limpele (Chinese Taipei) Cheng Wen-hsing | 12 | 17
3 | (China) He Hanbin (China) Yu Yang | 21 | 21
(Japan) Noriyasu Hirata (Japan) Miyuki Maeda | 8 | 14

Final
(China) Tao Jiaming (China) Zhang Yawen | 15 | 16
3 | (China) He Hanbin (China) Yu Yang | 21 | 21

=== Top half ===
==== Section 1 ====
First Round
1 | (South Korea) Lee Y-d (South Korea) Lee H-j | 13 | 16
(China) Tao JM (China) Zhang YW | 21 | 21
(Japan) N Kawamae (Japan) S Matsuo | 12 | 21 | 21
(England) C Adcock (England) G White | 21 | 15 | 18
7 | (Denmark) T Laybourn (Denmark) K Rytter Juhl | 22 | 15 | 21
(China) Zhang N (China) Zhao YL | 20 | 21 | 17
(Germany) M Fuchs (Germany) B Overzier | 17 | 21 | 21
Q | (Netherlands) J d Ruiter (Netherlands) L Jonathans | 21 | 18 | 14

Second Round
(China) Tao JM (China) Zhang YW | 21 | 21
(Japan) N Kawamae (Japan) S Matsuo | 15 | 19
7 | (Denmark) T Laybourn (Denmark) K Rytter Juhl | 22 | 21 | 21
(Germany) M Fuchs (Germany) B Overzier | 24 | 14 | 13

Quarter-finals
(China) Tao JM (China) Zhang YW | 21 | 21
7 | (Denmark) T Laybourn (Denmark) K Rytter Juhl | 12 | 15

==== Section 2 ====
First Round
4 | (Thailand) S Anugritayawon (Thailand) K Voravichitchaikul | 15 | 21 | 21
(Japan) H Hashimoto (Japan) M Fujii | 21 | 15 | 12
(South Korea) Hwang J-m (South Korea) Jang Y-n | 21 | 18 | 21
Q | (Japan) Y Hirobe (Japan) M Matsutomo | 15 | 21 | 14
5 | (Poland) R Mateusiak (Poland) N Kostiuczyk | 11 | 21 | 19
(Chinese Taipei) Fang C-m (Chinese Taipei) Wang P-r | 21 | 10 | 21
(Japan) K Kazuno (Japan) R Kakiiwa | 21 | 18 | 14
(Indonesia) F Limpele (Chinese Taipei) Cheng W-h | 19 | 21 | 21

Second Round
4 | (Thailand) S Anugritayawon (Thailand) K Voravichitchaikul | 21 | 13 | 21
(South Korea) Hwang J-m (South Korea) Jang Y-n | 13 | 21 | 13
(Chinese Taipei) Fang C-m (Chinese Taipei) Wang P-r | 21 | 15 | 11
(Indonesia) F Limpele (Chinese Taipei) Cheng W-h | 11 | 21 | 21

Quarter-finals
4 | (Thailand) S Anugritayawon (Thailand) K Voravichitchaikul | 18 | 16
(Indonesia) F Limpele (Chinese Taipei) Cheng W-h | 21 | 21

=== Bottom half ===
==== Section 3 ====
First Round
(Chinese Taipei) Lee S-m (Chinese Taipei) Chien Y-c | 21 | 21
(France) B Carême (France) L Choinet | 13 | 13
Q | (South Korea) Kim D-e (South Korea) Jung K-e | 18 | 19
8 | (South Korea) Ko S-h (South Korea) Ha J-e | 21 | 21
PFQ | (France) S Grosjean (France) W Rahmawati | 10 | 14
(South Korea) Yoo Y-s (South Korea) Park S-y | 21 | 21
(South Korea) Shin B-c (South Korea) Yoo H-y | 15 | 20
3 | (China) He HB (China) Yu Y | 21 | 22

Second Round
(Chinese Taipei) Lee S-m (Chinese Taipei) Chien Y-c | 13 | 10
8 | (South Korea) Ko S-h (South Korea) Ha J-e | 21 | 21
(South Korea) Yoo Y-s (South Korea) Park S-y | 12 | 21 | 12
3 | (China) He HB (China) Yu Y | 21 | 15 | 21

Quarter-finals
8 | (South Korea) Ko S-h (South Korea) Ha J-e | 10 | 17
3 | (China) He HB (China) Yu Y | 21 | 21

==== Section 4 ====
First Round
(Hong Kong) Wong W H (Hong Kong) Chau H W | 17 | 16
(South Korea) Kim K-j (South Korea) Eom H-w | 21 | 21
(Japan) K Hayakawa (Japan) A Takahashi | 7 | 19
6 | (Thailand) S Prapakamol (Thailand) S Thoungthongkam | 21 | 21
(Canada) T Ng (Canada) G Gao | 18 | 12
(Japan) N Hirata (Japan) M Maeda | 21 | 21
Q | (South Korea) Jung J-s (South Korea) Lee K-w | 21 | 14 | 21
PFQ | (Malaysia) Gan T C (Russia) A Russkikh | 13 | 21 | 15

Second Round
(South Korea) Kim K-j (South Korea) Eom H-w | 15 | 14
6 | (Thailand) S Prapakamol (Thailand) S Thoungthongkam | 21 | 21
(Japan) N Hirata (Japan) M Maeda | 21 | 21
Q | (South Korea) Jung J-s (South Korea) Lee K-w | 15 | 10

Quarter-finals
6 | (Thailand) S Prapakamol (Thailand) S Thoungthongkam | 19 | 15
(Japan) N Hirata (Japan) M Maeda | 21 | 21

| Preceded by 2009 BWF Super Series Masters Finals | BWF Super Series | Succeeded by 2010 Malaysia Super Series |
