= 2010 Indonesia Super Series =

Tournament details
- Dates: 22–27 June
- Edition: 29th
- Total prize money: US$250,000
- Venue: Istora Gelora Bung Karno
- Location: Jakarta, Indonesia

Champions
- Men's singles: (Malaysia) Lee Chong Wei
- Women's singles: (India) Saina Nehwal
- Men's doubles: (Chinese Taipei) Fang Chieh-min (Chinese Taipei) Lee Sheng-mu
- Women's doubles: (South Korea) Kim Min-jung (South Korea) Lee Hyo-jung
- Mixed doubles: (Poland) Robert Mateusiak (Poland) Nadieżda Kostiuczyk

The 2010 Indonesia Open Superseries was a top level badminton competition held from 22 to 27 June 2010 in Jakarta, Indonesia. It was the fifth BWF Superseries competition on the 2010 BWF Superseries schedule. The total purse for the event is $250,000.

== Men's singles ==
=== Seeds ===
1. (Malaysia) Lee Chong Wei (champion)
2. (Indonesia) Taufik Hidayat (final)
3. (Vietnam) Nguyen Tien Minh (semifinals)
4. (Thailand) Boonsak Ponsana (first round)
5. (Denmark) Jan Ø. Jørgensen (first round)
6. (Indonesia) Simon Santoso (quarterfinals)
7. (Indonesia) Sony Dwi Kuncoro (semifinals)
8. (Japan) Kenichi Tago (quarterfinals)

=== Finals ===
Semi-finals
1	(Malaysia) Lee Chong Wei	21	21
7	(Indonesia) Sony Dwi Kuncoro	13	9
3	(Vietnam) Nguyen Tien Minh	17	12
2	(Indonesia) Taufik Hidayat	21	21

Final
1	(Malaysia) Lee Chong Wei	21	21
2	(Indonesia) Taufik Hidayat	19	8

=== Top half ===
==== Section 1 ====
First Round
1	(Malaysia) Lee Chong Wei	21	21
(Indonesia) Dionysius Hayom Rumbaka	10	14
(Germany) Marc Zwiebler	21	21
(Denmark) Hans-Kristian Vittinghus	19	12
8	(Japan) Kenichi Tago	19	21	21
(France) Matthieu Lo Ying Ping	21	13	11
Q1	(India) R. M. V. Gurusaidutt	21	21
(Hong Kong) Chan Yan Kit	18	13

Second Round
1	(Malaysia) Lee Chong Wei	21	21
(Germany) Marc Zwiebler	9	14
8	(Japan) Kenichi Tago	11	21	21
Q1	(India) R. M. V. Gurusaidutt	21	18	11

Quarter-finals
1	(Malaysia) Lee Chong Wei	21	8	21
8	(Japan) Kenichi Tago	12	21	12

==== Section 2 ====
First Round
4	(Thailand) Boonsak Ponsana	18	7
(South Korea) Shon Wan-ho	21	21
Q4	(Indonesia) Alamsyah Yunus	22	19	17
(Malaysia) Wong Choong Hann	20	21	21
7	(Indonesia) Sony Dwi Kuncoro	21	21
(France) Brice Leverdez	11	12
(Chinese Taipei) Hsieh Yu-Hsin	17	9
(Netherlands) Dicky Palyama	21	21

Second Round
(South Korea) Shon Wan-ho	18	17
(Malaysia) Wong Choong Hann	21	21
7	(Indonesia) Sony Dwi Kuncoro	21	21
(Netherlands) Dicky Palyama

Quarter-finals
(Malaysia) Wong Choong Hann	11	17
7	(Indonesia) Sony Dwi Kuncoro	21	21

=== Bottom half ===
==== Section 3 ====
First Round
(Indonesia) Andre Kurniawan Tedjono	21	21
(Netherlands) Eric Pang	17	14
PFQ	(Japan) Sho Sasaki	21	0
5	(Denmark) Jan Ø. Jørgensen	18	0^{r}
(Thailand) Tanongsak Saensomboonsuk	25	22
Q3	(India) Ajay Jayaram	23	20
(Japan) Kazushi Yamada	18	11
3	(Vietnam) Nguyen Tien Minh	21	21

Second Round
(Indonesia) Andre Kurniawan Tedjono	17	21	14
PFQ	(Japan) Sho Sasaki	21	18	21
(Thailand) Tanongsak Saensomboonsuk	17	12
3	(Vietnam) Nguyen Tien Minh	21	21

Quarter-finals
PFQ	(Japan) Sho Sasaki	14	15
3	(Vietnam) Nguyen Tien Minh	21	21

==== Section 4 ====
First Round
(England) Andrew Smith	10	21	21
(Denmark) Joachim Persson	21	10	14
(Hong Kong) Hu Yun	23	6
6	(Indonesia) Simon Santoso	25	21
Q2	(Hong Kong) Wong Wing Ki	21	21
(India) Chetan Anand	15	9
(India) Kashyap Parupalli	21	19	16
2	(Indonesia) Taufik Hidayat	12	21	21

Second Round
(England) Andrew Smith
6	(Indonesia) Simon Santoso	w	/	o
Q2	(Hong Kong) Wong Wing Ki	12	21	13
2	(Indonesia) Taufik Hidayat	21	15	21

Quarter-finals
6	(Indonesia) Simon Santoso	14	21	13
2	(Indonesia) Taufik Hidayat	21	13	21

== Women's singles ==
=== Seeds ===
1. (India) Saina Nehwal (champions)
2. (France) Pi Hong Yan (withdrew)
3. (Hong Kong) Zhou Mi (first round)
4. (Japan) Eriko Hirose (semifinals)
5. (Netherlands) Yao Jie (quarterfinals)
6. (South Korea) Bae Seung-hee (withdrew)
7. (Hong Kong) Yip Pui Yin (quarterfinals)
8. (Russia) Ella Diehl (quarterfinals)

=== Finals ===
Semi-finals
1	(India) Saina Nehwal	21	21
4	(Japan) Eriko Hirose	9	10
(Japan) Sayaka Sato	22	21
Q4	(Indonesia) Ana Rovita	20	17

Final
1	(India) Saina Nehwal	21	13	21
(Japan) Sayaka Sato	19	21	11

=== Top half ===
==== Section 1 ====
First Round
1	(India) Saina Nehwal	22	17	21
(South Korea) Sung Ji-hyun	20	21	14
(Germany) Nicole Grether	9	15
(Bulgaria) Petya Nedelcheva	21	21
8	(Russia) Ella Diehl	12	21	21
(Japan) Yu Hirayama	21	16	18
(Canada) Charmaine Reid	19	15
(Indonesia) Maria Febe Kusumastuti	21	21

Second Round
1	(India) Saina Nehwal	21	21
(Bulgaria) Petya Nedelcheva	12	17
8	(Russia) Ella Diehl	21	21
(Indonesia) Maria Febe Kusumastuti	19	17

Quarter-finals
1	(India) Saina Nehwal	17	21	21
8	(Russia) Ella Diehl	21	11	16

==== Section 2 ====
First Round
4	(Japan) Eriko Hirose	21	21
(Singapore) Xing Aiying	19	10
(Switzerland) Jeanine Cicognini	14	13
Q3	(Indonesia) Lindaweni Fanetri	21	21
5	(Netherlands) Yao Jie	16	21	21
(Thailand) Salakjit Ponsana	21	15	13
(Bulgaria) Linda Zechiri	12	21	21
(Indonesia) Fransisca Ratnasari	21	16	19

Second Round
4	(Japan) Eriko Hirose	21	21
Q3	(Indonesia) Lindaweni Fanetri	15	16
5	(Netherlands) Yao Jie	12	21	21
(Bulgaria) Linda Zechiri	21	11	14

Quarter-finals
4	(Japan) Eriko Hirose	21	10	22
5	(Netherlands) Yao Jie	19	21	20

=== Bottom half ===
==== Section 3 ====
First Round
(Thailand) Porntip Buranaprasertsuk	19	21	15
(Japan) Ai Goto	21	6	21
(India) Aditi Mutatkar	17	14
7	(Hong Kong) Yip Pui Yin	21	21
(Indonesia) Adriyanti Firdasari	22	14	11
(South Korea) Kim Moon-hi	20	21	21
(Japan) Sayaka Sato	21	21
3	(Hong Kong) Zhou Mi	17	14

Second Round
(Japan) Ai Goto	14	10
7	(Hong Kong) Yip Pui Yin	21	21
(South Korea) Kim Moon-hi	18	16
(Japan) Sayaka Sato	21	21

Quarter-finals
7	(Hong Kong) Yip Pui Yin	9	23	19
(Japan) Sayaka Sato	21	21	21

==== Section 4 ====
First Round
Q1	(Indonesia) Rosaria Yusfin Pungkasari	14	21	21
Q2	(Chinese Taipei) Tai Tzu-ying	21	17	15
(Finland) Anu Nieminen	18	16
PFQ	(Indonesia) Maria Kristin Yulianti	21	21
(Slovenia) Maja Tvrdy	18	17
Q4	(Indonesia) Ana Rovita	21	21
(South Korea) Bae Youn-joo	21	19	19
PFQ	(Singapore) Fu Mingtian	16	21	21

Second Round
Q1	(Indonesia) Rosaria Yusfin Pungkasari	14	11
PFQ	(Indonesia) Maria Kristin Yulianti	21	21
Q4	(Indonesia) Ana Rovita	17	21	21
(Singapore) Fu Mingtian	21	11	15

Quarter-finals
PFQ	(Indonesia) Maria Kristin Yulianti	19	14
Q4	(Indonesia) Ana Rovita	21	21

== Men's doubles ==
=== Seeds ===
1. (Malaysia) Koo Kien Keat / Tan Boon Heong (quarterfinals)
2. (Indonesia) Markis Kido / Hendra Setiawan (second round)
3. (Chinese Taipei) Chen Hung-ling / Lin Yu-lang (first round)
4. (Malaysia) Choong Tan Fook / Lee Wan Wah (second round)
5. (United States) Howard Bach / Tony Gunawan (quarterfinals)
6. (Japan) Hirokatsu Hashimoto / Noriyasu Hirata (semifinals)
7. (Malaysia) Gan Teik Chai / Tan Bin Shen (second round)
8. (South Korea) Kim Ki-jung / Shin Baek-cheol (quarterfinals)

=== Finals ===
Semi-finals
6	(Japan) Hirokatsu Hashimoto (Japan) Noriyasu Hirata	21	12	14
Q1	(South Korea) Cho Gun-woo (South Korea) Kwon Yi-goo	19	21	21
(England) Anthony Clark (England) Nathan Robertson	21	9	20
(Chinese Taipei) Fang Chieh-min (Chinese Taipei) Lee Sheng-mu	15	21	22

Final
Q1	(South Korea) Cho Gun-woo (South Korea) Kwon Yi-goo	16	15
(Chinese Taipei) Fang Chieh-min (Chinese Taipei) Lee Sheng-mu	21	21

=== Top half ===
==== Section 1 ====
First Round
1	(Malaysia) Koo K K (Malaysia) Tan B H	21	21
(Indonesia) L Hadiyanto (Indonesia) C Wijaya	15	15
Q2	(Chinese Taipei) Liao M-c (Chinese Taipei) Wu C-w	21	22
(Denmark) M Conrad-Petersen (Denmark) M P Kolding	12	20
6	(Japan) H Hashimoto (Japan) N Hirata	21	23
(South Korea) Ko S-h (South Korea) Yoo Y-s	19	21
(Malaysia) Chow P C (Malaysia) Hong C H	21	21
(Thailand) S Anugritayawon (Thailand) S Prapakamol	14	15

Second Round
1	(Malaysia) Koo K K (Malaysia) Tan B H	w	/	o
Q2	(Chinese Taipei) Liao M-c (Chinese Taipei) Wu C-w
6	(Japan) H Hashimoto (Japan) N Hirata	17	21	21
(Malaysia) Chow P C (Malaysia) Hong C H	21	19	15

Quarter-finals
1	(Malaysia) Koo K K (Malaysia) Tan B H	21	19	18
6	(Japan) H Hashimoto (Japan) N Hirata	13	21	21

==== Section 2 ====
First Round
4	(Malaysia) Choong T F (Malaysia) Lee W W	21	21
(England) C Adcock (England) R Blair	15	14
Q1	(South Korea) Cho G-w (South Korea) Kwon Y-g	21	21
(Chinese Taipei) Hu C-h (Chinese Taipei) Tsai C-h	13	11
8	(South Korea) Kim G-j (South Korea) Shin B-c	21	21
(England) M Ellis (England) P Mills	18	8
(Australia) R Smith (Australia) G Warfe	11	9
(Indonesia) Y S Dasuki (Indonesia) R Sukmawan	21	21

Second Round
4	(Malaysia) Choong T F (Malaysia) Lee W W	13	10
Q1	(South Korea) Cho G-w (South Korea) Kwon Y-g	21	21
8	(South Korea) Kim G-j (South Korea) Shin B-c	15	21	21
(Indonesia) Y S Dasuki (Indonesia) R Sukmawan	21	19	6

Quarter-finals
Q1	(South Korea) Cho G-w (South Korea) Kwon Y-g	21	13	21
8	(South Korea) Kim G-j (South Korea) Shin B-c	12	21	16

=== Bottom half ===
==== Section 3 ====
First Round
(Malaysia) Hoon T H (Malaysia) Ong S H	14	25	15
(Indonesia) M Ahsan (Indonesia) B Septano	21	23	21
(New Zealand) O Leydon-Davis (New Zealand) H Tam	13	10
7	(Malaysia) Gan T C (Malaysia) Tan B S	21	21
(Indonesia) F Kurniawan (Indonesia) W Windarto	16	6
(Japan) N Kawamae (Japan) S Sato	21	21
(England) A Clark (England) N Robertson	22	21
3	(Chinese Taipei) Chen H-l (Chinese Taipei) Lin Y-l	20	14

Second Round
(Indonesia) M Ahsan (Indonesia) B Septano	21	21
7	(Malaysia) Gan T C (Malaysia) Tan B S	18	14
(Japan) N Kawamae (Japan) S Sato	16	17
(England) A Clark (England) N Robertson	21	21

Quarter-finals
(Indonesia) M Ahsan (Indonesia) B Septano	19	12
(England) A Clark (England) N Robertson	21	21

==== Section 4 ====
First Round
(Denmark) K Faust Henriksen (Denmark) A Kristiansen
(Indonesia) L Lie (Indonesia) J Riyadi	w	/	o
(Netherlands) R Bosch (Netherlands) K Ridder	9	19
5	(United States) H Bach (United States) T Gunawan	21	21
Q3	(Indonesia) B Angriawan (Indonesia) M Ulinnuha	7	16
(Chinese Taipei) Fang C-m (Chinese Taipei) Lee S-m	21	21
Q4	(Singapore) D B Chrisnanta (Singapore) C Triyachart	17	10
2	(Indonesia) M Kido (Indonesia) H Setiawan	21	21

Second Round
(Indonesia) L Lie (Indonesia) J Riyadi	21	13	17
5	(United States) H Bach (United States) T Gunawan	16	21	21
(Chinese Taipei) Fang C-m (Chinese Taipei) Lee S-m	25	21	21
2	(Indonesia) M Kido (Indonesia) H Setiawan	27	16	10

Quarter-finals
5	(United States) H Bach (United States) T Gunawan	15	18
(Chinese Taipei) Fang C-m (Chinese Taipei) Lee S-m	21	21

== Women's doubles ==
=== Seeds ===
1. (Japan) Miyuki Maeda / Satoko Suetsuna (semifinals)
2. (Japan) Mizuki Fujii / Reika Kakiiwa (second round)
3. (Bulgaria) Petya Nedelcheva / (Russia) Anastasia Russkikh (second round)
4. (Chinese Taipei) Cheng Wen-Hsing / Chien Yu-Chin (final)
5. (South Korea) Kim Min-jung / Lee Hyo-jung (champions)
6. (Thailand) Savitree Amitrapai / Vacharaporn Munkit (quarterfinals)
7. (South Korea) Ha Jung-eun / Jung Kyung-eun (quarterfinals)
8. (Japan) Shizuka Matsuo / Mami Naito (second round)

=== Finals ===
Semi-finals
1	(Japan) Miyuki Maeda (Japan) Satoko Suetsuna	16	18
5	(South Korea) Kim Min-jung (South Korea) Lee Hyo-jung	21	21
4	(Chinese Taipei) Cheng Wen-hsing (Chinese Taipei) Chien Yu-chin	21	21
(Indonesia) Vita Marissa (Thailand) Saralee Thoungthongkam	15	15

Final
5	(South Korea) Kim Min-jung (South Korea) Lee Hyo-jung	21	12	21
4	(Chinese Taipei) Cheng Wen-hsing (Chinese Taipei) Chien Yu-chin	12	21	11

=== Top half ===
==== Section 1 ====
First Round
1	(Japan) M Maeda (Japan) S Suetsuna	16	21	21
(Germany) N Grether (Canada) C Reid	21	9	5
(Chinese Taipei) Hsieh P-c (Chinese Taipei) Wang P-r	21	16
(Thailand) D Aroonkesorn (Thailand) K Voravichitchaikul	23	21
6	(Thailand) S Amitrapai (Thailand) V Munkit	8
(England) M Agathangelou (England) H Olver	7^{r}
(Indonesia) A F Agustin (Indonesia) A Wahyuni	21	24
(Japan) M Matsutomo (Japan) A Takahashi	14	22

Second Round
1	(Japan) M Maeda (Japan) S Suetsuna	21	21
(Thailand) D Aroonkesorn (Thailand) K Voravichitchaikul	8	12
6	(Thailand) S Amitrapai (Thailand) V Munkit	21	21
(Indonesia) A F Agustin (Indonesia) A Wahyuni	13	15

Quarter-finals
1	(Japan) M Maeda (Japan) S Suetsuna	21	21
6	(Thailand) S Amitrapai (Thailand) V Munkit	16	17

==== Section 2 ====
First Round
3	(Bulgaria) P Nedelcheva (Russia) A Russkikh	14	21	21
(Indonesia) N Melati (Indonesia) D T Permatasari	21	13	10
(United States) I Wang (United States) R Wang	14	13
(Indonesia) M Jauhari (Indonesia) G Polii	21	21
5	(South Korea) Kim M-j (South Korea) Lee H-j	21	21
Q4	(Indonesia) D Agustiawati (Indonesia) A Rahmasari	11	9
(New Zealand) D Tahuri (New Zealand) D Haliday	14	14
(Indonesia) S P Irawati (Indonesia) N K Maheswari	21	21

Second Round
3	(Bulgaria) P Nedelcheva (Russia) A Russkikh	21	13	13
(Indonesia) M Jauhari (Indonesia) G Polii	13	21	21
5	(South Korea) Kim M-j (South Korea) Lee H-j	21	21
(Indonesia) S P Irawati (Indonesia) N K Maheswari	15	19

Quarter-finals
(Indonesia) M Jauhari (Indonesia) G Polii	15	19
5	(South Korea) Kim M-j (South Korea) Lee H-j	21	21

=== Bottom half ===
==== Section 3 ====
First Round
(Netherlands) L Jonathans (Netherlands) P van Dooremalen	21	18	13
Q1	(Indonesia) S R Andini (Indonesia) D D Haris	15	21	21
(Denmark) L F Kristiansen (Denmark) M Røpke	12	16
8	(Japan) S Matsuo (Japan) M Naito	21	21
PFQ	(Singapore) Fu M T (Singapore) V Neo Y Y	21	21
Q2	(Indonesia) G R Imawan (Indonesia) T R Nuraidah	8	17
(Indonesia) K Dewi (Indonesia) K N Hanadia	16	11
4	(Chinese Taipei) Cheng W-h (Chinese Taipei) Chien Y-c	21	21

Second Round
Q1	(Indonesia) S R Andini (Indonesia) D D Haris	21	21
8	(Japan) S Matsuo (Japan) M Naito	12	16
PFQ	(Singapore) Fu M T (Singapore) V Neo Y Y	14	12
4	(Chinese Taipei) Cheng W-h (Chinese Taipei) Chien Y-c	21	21

Quarter-finals
Q1	(Indonesia) S R Andini (Indonesia) D D Haris	17	9
4	(Chinese Taipei) Cheng W-h (Chinese Taipei) Chien Y-c	21	21

==== Section 4 ====
First Round
(Denmark) L D Kruse (Denmark) M Schjøtt-Kristensen	18	0^{r}
(France) L Choinet (France) W Rasidi	21	0
(England) J Wallwork (England) G White	9	18
7	(South Korea) Ha J-e (South Korea) Jung K-e	21	21
(Chinese Taipei) Hsu Y-c (Chinese Taipei) Tai T-y	18	10
(Indonesia) V Marissa (Thailand) S Thungthongkam	21	21
Q3	(Indonesia) L Nurlita (Indonesia) N Poluakan	12	22	22
2	(Japan) M Fujii (Japan) R Kakiiwa	21	20	24

Second Round
(France) L Choinet (France) W Rasidi	12	10
7	(South Korea) Ha J-e (South Korea) Jung K-e	21	21
(Indonesia) V Marissa (Thailand) S Thungthongkam	28	21	21
2	(Japan) M Fujii (Japan) R Kakiiwa	30	13	17

Quarter-finals
7	(South Korea) Ha J-e (South Korea) Jung K-e	19	19
(Indonesia) V Marissa (Thailand) S Thungthongkam	21	21

== Mixed doubles ==
=== Seeds ===
1. (Indonesia) Nova Widianto / Liliyana Natsir (semifinals)
2. (Denmark) Thomas Laybourn / Kamilla Rytter Juhl (quarterfinals)
3. (Poland) Robert Mateusiak / Nadieżda Zięba (champions)
4. (Thailand) Songphon Anugritayawan / Kunchala Voravichitchaikul (second round)
5. (South Korea) Shin Baek-cheol / Lee Hyo-jung (second round)
6. (England) Nathan Robertson / Jenny Wallwork (second round)
7. (South Korea) Ko Sung-hyun / Ha Jung-eun (semifinals)
8. (Thailand) Sudket Prapakamol / Saralee Thoungthongkam (quarterfinals)

=== Finals ===
Semi-finals
1	(Indonesia) Nova Widianto (Indonesia) Liliyana Natsir	12	21	19
3	(Poland) Robert Mateusiak (Poland) Nadieżda Zięba	21	16	21
Q4	(Indonesia) Hendra Setiawan (Russia) Anastasia Russkikh	19	21	21
7	(South Korea) Ko Sung-hyun (South Korea) Ha Jung-eun	21	13	17

Final
3	(Poland) Robert Mateusiak (Poland) Nadieżda Zięba	21	22
Q4	(Indonesia) Hendra Setiawan (Russia) Anastasia Russkikh	18	20

=== Top half ===
==== Section 1 ====
First Round
1	(Indonesia) N Widianto (Indonesia) L Natsir	21	21
(Japan) N Hirata (Japan) M Maeda	11	10
(Indonesia) F Limpele (Netherlands) L Jonathans	22	15	17
(Thailand) P Chalardchaleam (Thailand) S Amitrapai	20	21	21
8	(Thailand) S Prapakamol (Thailand) S Thoungthongkam	21	21
(Denmark) M D Larsen (Denmark) M Schjøtt-Kristensen	12	11
(Chinese Taipei) Chen H-l (Chinese Taipei) Cheng W-h	22	14	21
(Singapore) C Triyachart (Singapore) Yao L	20	21	19

Second Round
1	(Indonesia) N Widianto (Indonesia) L Natsir	21	18	21
(Thailand) P Chalardchaleam (Thailand) S Amitrapai	10	21	11
8	(Thailand) S Prapakamol (Thailand) S Thoungthongkam	21	22	21
(Chinese Taipei) Chen H-l (Chinese Taipei) Cheng W-h	11	24	18

Quarter-finals
1	(Indonesia) N Widianto (Indonesia) L Natsir	21	21
8	(Thailand) S Prapakamol (Thailand) S Thoungthongkam	16	14

==== Section 2 ====
First Round
3	(Poland) R Mateusiak (Poland) N Zięba	21	21
Q2	(South Korea) Kim G-j (South Korea) Jung K-e	13	12
(England) R Blair (England) G White	22	14	21
(Japan) S Ikeda (Japan) R Shiota	20	21	16
5	(South Korea) Shin B-c (South Korea) Lee H-j	21	21
Q3	(Indonesia) M Kido (Indonesia) L Nurlita	18	16
(Japan) H Hashimoto (Japan) M Fujii	19	17
(Indonesia) F Kurniawan (Indonesia) P Z Bernadeth	21	21

Second Round
3	(Poland) R Mateusiak (Poland) N Zięba	21	25
(England) R Blair (England) G White	15	23
5	(South Korea) Shin B-c (South Korea) Lee H-j	21	19	16
(Indonesia) F Kurniawan (Indonesia) P Z Bernadeth	10	21	21

Quarter-finals
3	(Poland) R Mateusiak (Poland) N Zięba	16	23	21
(Indonesia) F Kurniawan (Indonesia) P Z Bernadeth	21	21	15

=== Bottom half ===
==== Section 3 ====
First Round
(New Zealand) J Wu (New Zealand) D Barry	7	10
(Indonesia) M Rijal (Indonesia) D Susanto	21	21
(Chinese Taipei) Lee S-m (Chinese Taipei) Chien Y-c	21	13	19
6	(England) N Robertson (England) J Wallwork	17	21	21
Q4	(Indonesia) H Setiawan (Russia) A Russkikh	21	21
(South Korea) Yoo Y-s (South Korea) Kim M-j	15	14
(New Zealand) H Tam (New Zealand) D Haliday	12	18
4	(Thailand) S Anugritayawon (Thailand) K Voravichitchaikul	21	21

Second Round
(Indonesia) M Rijal (Indonesia) D Susanto	21	21
6	(England) N Robertson (England) J Wallwork	12	13
Q4	(Indonesia) H Setiawan (Russia) A Russkikh	19	21	21
4	(Thailand) S Anugritayawon (Thailand) K Voravichitchaikul	21	14	19

Quarter-finals
(Indonesia) M Rijal (Indonesia) D Susanto	15	21	21
Q4	(Indonesia) H Setiawan (Russia) A Russkikh	21	18	23

==== Section 4 ====
First Round
(Japan) K Hayakawa (Japan) S Matsuo	16	20
(Chinese Taipei) Fang C-m (Chinese Taipei) Wang P-r	21	22
(Denmark) R Bonde (Denmark) C Pedersen	18	18
7	(South Korea) Ko S-h (South Korea) Ha J-e	21	21
(England) M Ellis (England) M Agathangelou	7^{r}
Q1	(Indonesia) T Ahmad (Indonesia) G Polii	8
(England) A Clark (England) H Olver	8	16
2	(Denmark) T Laybourn (Denmark) K R Juhl	21	21

Second Round
(Chinese Taipei) Fang C-m (Chinese Taipei) Wang P-r	13	15
7	(South Korea) Ko S-h (South Korea) Ha J-e	21	21
(Indonesia) T Ahmad (Indonesia) G Polii	18	21	15
2	(Denmark) T Laybourn (Denmark) K R Juhl	21	19	21

Quarter-finals
7	(South Korea) Ko S-h (South Korea) Ha J-e	21	21
2	(Denmark) T Laybourn (Denmark) K R Juhl	17	16

Preceded by 2009 Indonesia Open Super Series	Indonesia Open Super Series	Succeeded by 2011 Indonesia Super Series Premier
Preceded by 2010 Singapore Open Super Series	BWF Super Series	Succeeded by 2010 China Masters Super Series
