= 2010 Japan Super Series =

The 2010 Japan Open Super Series was a top level badminton competition held from September 21, 2010 to September 26, 2010 in Tokyo, Japan. It was the seventh BWF Super Series competition on the 2010 BWF Super Series schedule. The total purse for the event was $200,000.

== Men's singles ==
=== Seeds ===
1. (Malaysia) Lee Chong Wei (Champion)
2. (Denmark) Peter Gade (semi-finals)
3. (China) Chen Jin
4. (Indonesia) Taufik Hidayat (first round)
5. (China) Lin Dan (final)
6. (China) Bao Chunlai (quarter-finals)
7. (Vietnam) Nguyen Tien Minh (quarter-finals)
8. (Indonesia) Sony Dwi Kuncoro

=== Results ===
First Round
1	(Malaysia) Lee Chong Wei	21	21
(India) Gurusaidatt Venkata	5	9
(Malaysia) Muhammad Hafiz	21	13	12
(Japan) Kenichi Tago	16	21	21
6	(China) Bao Chunlai	21	21
(Indonesia) Dionysius Rumbaka	14	10
(Japan) Kazushi Yamada	21	21
Q4	(Japan) Riichi Takeshita	11	15
PFQ	(France) Matthieu Ping	21	16	21
(Chinese Taipei) Hsieh Yu-hsing	18	21	15
(Thailand) Boonsak Ponsana	21	21
(China) Du Pengyu	19	16
PFQ	(Denmark) Christian Thomsen	10	4r
(China) Chen Long	21	11
(France) Brice Leverdez	18	21	20
Q3	(Indonesia) Alamsyah Yunus	21	19	22
(Hong Kong) Hu Yun	21	21
(South Korea) Son Wan-ho	18	15
(Thailand) Tanongsak Saensomboonsuk	12	13
5	(China) Lin Dan	21	21
Q2	(Chinese Taipei) Chou Tien-chen	12	13
(South Korea) Park Sung-hwan	21	21
(Japan) Sho Sasaki	18	23	21
4	(Indonesia) Taufik Hidayat	21	21	19
(Netherlands) Dicky Palyama	17	11
(Denmark) Jan Ø. Jørgensen	21	21
(Hong Kong) Chan Yan Kit	21	10	14
7	(Vietnam) Nguyen Tien Minh	16	21	21
Q1	(Japan) Takuma Ueda	21	21
(Netherlands) Eric Pang	10	11
(Hong Kong) Wong Wing Ki	13	16
2	(Denmark) Peter Gade	21	21

Second Round
1	(Malaysia) Lee Chong Wei	21	21
(Japan) Kenichi Tago	10	10
6	(China) Bao Chunlai	21	21
(Japan) Kazushi Yamada	13	13
PFQ	(France) Matthieu Ping	19	6
(Thailand) Boonsak Ponsana	21	21
(China) Chen Long	21	21
Q3	(Indonesia) Alamsyah Yunus	15	12
(Hong Kong) Hu Yun	17	14
5	(China) Lin Dan	21	21
(South Korea) Park Sung-hwan	21	21
(Japan) Sho Sasaki	12	15
(Denmark) Jan Ø. Jørgensen	11	20
7	(Vietnam) Nguyen Tien Minh	21	22
Q1	(Japan) Takuma Ueda	3	21	12
2	(Denmark) Peter Gade	21	17	21

Quarterfinals
1	(Malaysia) Lee Chong Wei	21	21
6	(China) Bao Chunlai	10	10
(Thailand) Boonsak Ponsana	21	17	21
(China) Chen Long	16	21	12
5	(China) Lin Dan	22	21
(South Korea) Park Sung-hwan	20	16
7	(Vietnam) Nguyen Tien Minh	13	13
2	(Denmark) Peter Gade	21	21

Semifinals
1	(Malaysia) Lee Chong Wei	21	21
(Thailand) Boonsak Ponsana	13	18
5	(China) Lin Dan	21	21
2	(Denmark) Peter Gade	11	19

Finals
1	(Malaysia) Lee Chong Wei	22	16	21
5	(China) Lin Dan	20	21	17

== Women's singles ==
=== Seeds ===
1. (China) Wang Yihan
2. (China) Wang Xin (final)
3. (China) Wang Shixian
4. (Denmark) Tine Baun
5. (China) Wang Lin
6. (France) Pi Hongyan
7. (Japan) Eriko Hirose
8. (Netherlands) Yao Jie

=== Results ===
First Round
1	(China) Wang Yihan	21	21
(Switzerland) Jeanine Cicognini	10	6
Q4	(Thailand) Ratchanok Inthanon	18	14
(China) Lu Lan	21	21
6	(France) Pi Hongyan	20	21	21
(Japan) Yu Hirayama	22	10	12
(Indonesia) Adriyanti Firdasari	15	21
(China) Jiang Yanjiao	21	23
3	(China) Wang Shixian	21	21
(Japan) Megumi Taruno	14	16
(South Korea) Bae Seung-hee	17	21	11
(Thailand) Porntip Buranaprasertsuk	21	17	21
PFQ	(Japan) Shizuka Uchida	21	22
(Japan) Ai Goto	12	20
(Slovenia) Maja Tvrdy	16	15
(Chinese Taipei) Tai Tzu-ying	21	21
(Japan) Sayaka Sato	21	21
Q3	(Hong Kong) Tse Ying Suet	16	13
(South Korea) Sung Ji-hyun	21	21
8	(Netherlands) Yao Jie	18	15
(Indonesia) Maria Febe Kusumastuti	17	16
(Hong Kong) Yip Pui Yin	21	21
(Thailand) Salakjit Ponsana	13	11
4	(Denmark) Tine Baun	21	21
(Bulgaria) Petya Nedelcheva	15	21	21
Q2	(Chinese Taipei) Hung Shih-han	21	15	11
(Chinese Taipei) Cheng Shao-chieh	15	11
7	(Japan) Eriko Hirose	21	21
(South Korea) Bae Youn-joo	21	21
(Hong Kong) Chan Tsz Ka	8	9
Q1	(Chinese Taipei) Pai Hsiao-ma	16	14
2	(China) Wang Xin	21	21

Second Round
1	(China) Wang Yihan	15	9
(China) Lu Lan	21	21
6	(France) Pi Hongyan	6	11
(China) Jiang Yanjiao	21	21
3	(China) Wang Shixian	23	21
(Thailand) Porntip Buranaprasertsuk	21	15
PFQ	(Japan) Shizuka Uchida	21	21
(Chinese Taipei) Tai Tzu-ying	18	8
(Japan) Sayaka Sato	13	12
(South Korea) Sung Ji-hyun	21	21
(Hong Kong) Yip Pui Yin	16	21	16
4	(Denmark) Tine Baun	21	14	21
(Bulgaria) Petya Nedelcheva	19	18
7	(Japan) Eriko Hirose	21	21
(South Korea) Bae Youn-joo	21	21
2	(China) Wang Xin	15	14

Quarterfinals
(China) Lu Lan	17	15
(China) Jiang Yanjiao	21	21
3	(China) Wang Shixian	21	16	21
PFQ	(Japan) Shizuka Uchida	11	21	13
(South Korea) Sung Ji-hyun	11	18
4	(Denmark) Tine Baun	21	21
7	(Japan) Eriko Hirose	14	21	10
2	(China) Wang Xin	21	18	21

Semifinals
(China) Jiang Yanjiao	21	23
3	(China) Wang Shixian	19	21
4	(Denmark) Tine Baun	17	16
2	(China) Wang Xin	21	21

Finals
(China) Jiang Yanjiao	23	21
2	(China) Wang Xin	21	18

== Men's doubles ==
=== Seeds ===
1. (Malaysia) Koo Kien Keat / Tan Boon Heong (final)
2. (Indonesia) Markis Kido / Hendra Setiawan
3. (Denmark) Mathias Boe / Carsten Mogensen
4. (China) Guo Zhendong / Xu Chen
5. (China) Cai Yun / Fu Haifeng (champions)
6. (Chinese Taipei) Fang Chieh-min / Lee Sheng-mu
7. (South Korea) Jung Jae-sung / Lee Yong-dae
8. (Indonesia) Alvent Yulianto Chandra / Hendra Aprida Gunawan

=== Results ===
Quarterfinals
1	(Malaysia) Koo Kien Keat (Malaysia) Tan Boon Heong	21	17	21
(South Korea) Kim Gi-jung (South Korea) Shin Baek-cheol	7	21	11
(Indonesia) Luluk Hadiyanto (Indonesia) Candra Wijaya	19	14
(Indonesia) Mohammad Ahsan (Indonesia) Bona Septano	21	21
(China) Chai Biao (China) Zhang Nan	21	21
(Malaysia) Mak Hee Chun (Malaysia) Tan Wee Kiong	19	14
5	(China) Cai Yun (China) Fu Haifeng	21	16	21
(South Korea) Cho Gun-woo (South Korea) Kwon Yi-goo	14	21	12

Semifinals
1	(Malaysia) Koo Kien Keat (Malaysia) Tan Boon Heong	21	21
(Indonesia) Mohammad Ahsan (Indonesia) Bona Septano	19	13
(China) Chai Biao (China) Zhang Nan	17	16
5	(China) Cai Yun (China) Fu Haifeng	21	21

Finals
1	(Malaysia) Koo Kien Keat (Malaysia) Tan Boon Heong	21	14	12
5	(China) Cai Yun (China) Fu Haifeng	18	21	21

== Women's doubles ==
=== Seeds ===
1. (Chinese Taipei) Cheng Wen-hsing / Chien Yu-chin
2. (Japan) Miyuki Maeda / Satoko Suetsuna
3. (China) Cheng Shu / Zhao Yunlei
4. (Japan) Mizuki Fujii / Reika Kakiiwa
5. (China) Wang Xiaoli / Yu Yang
6. (China) Pan Pan / Tian Qing
7. (South Korea) Kim Min-jung / Lee Hyo-jung
8. (Indonesia) Meiliana Jauhari / Greysia Polii

=== Results ===
Quarterfinals
1	(Chinese Taipei) Cheng Wen-hsing (Chinese Taipei) Chien Yu-chin	19	21	21
7	(South Korea) Kim Min-jung (South Korea) Lee Hyo-jung	21	14	16
3	(China) Cheng Shu (China) Zhao Yunlei	21	24
(South Korea) Ha Jung-eun (South Korea) Jung Kyung-eun	15	22
5	(China) Wang Xiaoli (China) Yu Yang	21	21
(South Korea) Jang Ye-na (South Korea) Kim Min-seo	6	9
(Macau) Zhang Dan (Macau) Zhang Zhibo	18	16
2	(Japan) Miyuki Maeda (Japan) Satoko Suetsuna	21	21

Semifinals
1	(Chinese Taipei) Cheng Wen-hsing (Chinese Taipei) Chien Yu-chin	17	21	18
3	(China) Cheng Shu (China) Zhao Yunlei	21	15	21
5	(China) Wang Xiaoli (China) Yu Yang	21	21
2	(Japan) Miyuki Maeda (Japan) Satoko Suetsuna	5	10

Finals
3	(China) Cheng Shu (China) Zhao Yunlei	17	6
5	(China) Wang Xiaoli (China) Yu Yang	21	21

== Mixed doubles ==
=== Seeds ===
1. (Indonesia) Nova Widianto / Lilyana Natsir
2. (Indonesia) Hendra Aprida Gunawan / Vita Marissa
3. (Denmark) Thomas Laybourn / Kamilla Rytter Juhl
4. (Thailand) Songphon Anugritayawan / Kunchala Voravichitchaikul
5. (Denmark) Joachim Fischer Nielsen / Christinna Pedersen
6. (China) He Hanbin / Ma Jin
7. (Chinese Taipei) Chen Hung-ling / Cheng Wen-hsing
8. (China) Tao Jiaming / Tian Qing

=== Results ===
Quarterfinals
(China) Zhang Nan (China) Zhao Yunlei	21	23
6	(China) He Hanbin (China) Ma Jin	17	21
(Indonesia) Fran Kurniawan Teng (Indonesia) Pia Zebadiah Bernadet	17	17
7	(Chinese Taipei) Chen Hung-ling (Chinese Taipei) Cheng Wen-hsing	21	21
5	(Denmark) Joachim Fischer Nielsen (Denmark) Christinna Pedersen	21	21
3	(Denmark) Thomas Laybourn (Denmark) Kamilla Rytter Juhl	15	16
8	(China) Tao Jiaming (China) Tian Qing	21	21
2	(Indonesia) Hendra Aprida Gunawan (Indonesia) Vita Marissa	10	9

Semifinals
(China) Zhang Nan (China) Zhao Yunlei	21	21
7	(Chinese Taipei) Chen Hung-ling (Chinese Taipei) Cheng Wen-hsing	16	11
5	(Denmark) Joachim Fischer Nielsen (Denmark) Christinna Pedersen	14	20
8	(China) Tao Jiaming (China) Tian Qing	21	22

Finals
(China) Zhang Nan (China) Zhao Yunlei	21	22
8	(China) Tao Jiaming (China) Tian Qing	19	20

Preceded by 2009 Japan Super Series	Japan Super Series	Succeeded by 2011 Japan Super Series
Preceded by 2010 China Masters Super Series	2010 BWF Super Series	Succeeded by 2010 Denmark Super Series
