= 2010 BWF Super Series =

Tournament details
- Dates: 12 January 2010 – 9 January 2011
- Edition: 4th

The 2010 BWF Super Series was the fourth season of the BWF Super Series. Like the previous season, the twelve tournaments were all hosted by nations in Asia and Europe with the Korea Open as the opening tournament and the Hong Kong Open as the final tournament in the season.

== Schedule ==
Below is the schedule released by the Badminton World Federation:

| Tour | Official title | Venue | City | Date | | Prize money USD | Report |
| Tour | Official title | Venue | City | Start | Finish | Prize money USD | Report |
|---|---|---|---|---|---|---|---|
| 1 | (South Korea) Korea Open Super Series | 2nd Olympic Gymnasium | Seoul | January 12 | January 17 | 300,000 | Report |
| 2 | Malaysia Open Super Series | Putra Indoor Stadium | Kuala Lumpur | January 19 | January 24 | 200,000 | Report |
| 3 | All England Super Series | Arena Birmingham | Birmingham | March 9 | March 14 | 200,000 | Report |
| 4 | (Switzerland) Swiss Open Super Series | St. Jakobshalle | Basel | March 16 | March 21 | 200,000 | Report |
| 5 | Singapore Super Series | Singapore Indoor Stadium | Singapore | June 15 | June 20 | 200,000 | Report |
| 6 | Indonesia Super Series | Istora Senayan | Jakarta | June 22 | June 27 | 250,000 | Report |
| 7 | China Masters Super Series | Olympic Sports Center Gymnasium | Changzhou | September 14 | September 18 | 250,000 | Report |
| 8 | Japan Super Series | Tokyo Metropolitan Gymnasium | Tokyo | September 21 | September 26 | 200,000 | Report |
| 9 | Denmark Super Series | Odense Sports Park | Odense | October 26 | October 31 | 200,000 | Report |
| 10 | (France) French Super Series | Stade Pierre de Coubertin | Paris | November 2 | November 7 | 200,000 | Report |
| 11 | China Open Super Series | Yuanshen Gymnasium | Shanghai | November 30 | December 5 | 250,000 | Report |
| 12 | Hong Kong Super Series | Queen Elizabeth Stadium | Hong Kong | December 7 | December 12 | 250,000 | Report |
| 13 | (Taiwan) Super Series Masters Finals | Xinzhuang Gymnasium | New Taipei City | January 5 | January 9 | 500,000 | Report |

== Results ==
=== Winners ===
| Tour | Men's singles | Women's singles | Men's doubles | Women's doubles | Mixed doubles |
|---|---|---|---|---|---|
| (South Korea) Korea | (Malaysia) Lee Chong Wei | (China) Wang Shixian | (South Korea) Jung Jae-sung (South Korea) Lee Yong-dae | (China) Cheng Shu (China) Zhao Yunlei | (China) He Hanbin (China) Yu Yang |
| Malaysia | (Malaysia) Lee Chong Wei | (China) Wang Xin | (Malaysia) Koo Kien Keat (Malaysia) Tan Boon Heong | (China) Du Jing (China) Yu Yang | (China) Tao Jiaming (China) Zhang Yawen |
| England | (Malaysia) Lee Chong Wei | (Denmark) Tine Rasmussen | (Denmark) Lars Paaske (Denmark) Jonas Rasmussen | (China) Du Jing (China) Yu Yang | (China) Zhang Nan (China) Zhao Yunlei |
| (Switzerland) Swiss | (China) Chen Jin | (China) Wang Shixian | (South Korea) Ko Sung-hyun (South Korea) Yoo Yeon-seong | (China) Tian Qing (China) Yu Yang | (South Korea) Lee Yong-dae (South Korea) Lee Hyo-jung |
| Singapore | (Indonesia) Sony Dwi Kuncoro | (India) Saina Nehwal | (Chinese Taipei) Fang Chieh-min (Chinese Taipei) Lee Sheng-mu | (Singapore) Shinta Mulia Sari (Singapore) Yao Lei | (Denmark) Thomas Laybourn (Denmark) Kamilla Rytter Juhl |
| Indonesia | (Malaysia) Lee Chong Wei | (India) Saina Nehwal | (Chinese Taipei) Fang Chieh-min (Chinese Taipei) Lee Sheng-mu | (South Korea) Lee Hyo-jung (South Korea) Kim Min-jung | (Poland) Robert Mateusiak (Poland) Nadieżda Kostiuczyk |
| China Masters | (China) Lin Dan | (China) Wang Xin | (China) Cai Yun (China) Fu Haifeng | (China) Wang Xiaoli (China) Yu Yang | (China) Tao Jiaming (China) Tian Qing |
| Japan | (Malaysia) Lee Chong Wei | (China) Jiang Yanjiao | (China) Cai Yun (China) Fu Haifeng | (China) Wang Xiaoli (China) Yu Yang | (China) Zhang Nan (China) Zhao Yunlei |
| Denmark | (Denmark) Jan Ø. Jørgensen | (China) Wang Yihan | (Denmark) Mathias Boe (Denmark) Carsten Mogensen | (Japan) Miyuki Maeda (Japan) Satoko Suetsuna | (Denmark) Thomas Laybourn (Denmark) Kamilla Rytter Juhl |
| (France) French | (Indonesia) Taufik Hidayat | (China) Wang Yihan | (Denmark) Mathias Boe (Denmark) Carsten Mogensen | (Thailand) Duanganong Aroonkesorn (Thailand) Kunchala Voravichitchaikul | (Thailand) Sudket Prapakamol (Thailand) Saralee Thungthongkam |
| China Open | (China) Chen Long | (China) Jiang Yanjiao | (South Korea) Jung Jae-sung (South Korea) Lee Yong-dae | (China) Cheng Shu (China) Zhao Yunlei | (China) Tao Jiaming (China) Tian Qing |
| Hong Kong | (Malaysia) Lee Chong Wei | (India) Saina Nehwal | (South Korea) Ko Sung-hyun (South Korea) Yoo Yeon-seong | (China) Wang Xiaoli (China) Yu Yang | (Denmark) Joachim Fischer Nielsen (Denmark) Christinna Pedersen |
| (Taiwan) Masters Finals | (Malaysia) Lee Chong Wei | (China) Wang Shixian | (Denmark) Mathias Boe (Denmark) Carsten Mogensen | (China) Wang Xiaoli (China) Yu Yang | (China) Zhang Nan (China) Zhao Yunlei |

=== Performance by countries ===
Tabulated below are the Super Series performances based on countries. Only countries who have won a title are listed:

| Team | KOR | MAS | ENG | SUI | SIN | INA | CHN | JPN | DEN | FRA | CHN | HKG | SSF | Total |
|---|---|---|---|---|---|---|---|---|---|---|---|---|---|---|
| China | 3 | 3 | 2 | 3 | | | 5 | 4 | 1 | 1 | 4 | 1 | 3 | 30 |
| Denmark | | | 2 | | 1 | | | | 3 | 1 | | 1 | 1 | 9 |
| Malaysia | 1 | 2 | 1 | | | 1 | | 1 | | | | 1 | 1 | 8 |
| Korea | 1 | | | 2 | | 1 | | | | | 1 | 1 | | 6 |
| India | | | | | 1 | 1 | | | | | | 1 | | 3 |
| Chinese Taipei | | | | | 1 | 1 | | | | | | | | 2 |
| Thailand | | | | | | | | | | 2 | | | | 2 |
| Indonesia | | | | | 1 | | | | | 1 | | | | 2 |
| Japan | | | | | | | | | 1 | | | | | 1 |
| Singapore | | | | | 1 | | | | | | | | | 1 |
| Poland | | | | | | 1 | | | | | | | | 1 |
