= 2010 China Masters Super Series =

Badminton tournament in Changzhou

The 2010 China Masters Super Series was a top level badminton competition which was held from September 14, 2010 to September 19, 2010 in Changzhou, China. It was the seventh BWF Super Series competition on the 2010 BWF Super Series schedule. The total purse for the event was $250,000.

== Men's singles ==
=== Seeds ===
1. (Malaysia) Lee Chong Wei (withdrew)
2. (Indonesia) Taufik Hidayat (withdrew)
3. (China) Chen Jin
4. (China) Lin Dan
5. (China) Bao Chunlai
6. (Thailand) Boonsak Ponsana
7. (China) Chen Long
8. (Denmark) Jan Ø. Jørgensen

=== Results ===
1st round
PFQ	(South Korea) Lee Cheol-ho	12	21	21
(India) Arvind Bhat	21	10	10
(Denmark) Christian Lind Thomsen	16	21	21
(France) Matthieu Lo Ying Ping	21	17	5
5	(China) Bao Chunlai	21	18	21
(South Korea) Shon Wan-ho	12	21	9
Q4	(China) Qiao Bin	21	21
Q1	(China) Lü Yi	11	10
3	(China) Chen Jin	21	25
(South Korea) Hong Ji-hoon	11	23
(China) Gao Huan	19	21	10
(Chinese Taipei) Chou Tien-chen	21	14	21
7	(China) Chen Long	21	21
(Israel) Misha Zilberman	10	10
(Hong Kong) Chan Yan Kit	11	13
(Indonesia) Dionysius Hayom Rumbaka	21	21
(Netherlands) Dicky Palyama	13	18
Q3	(China) Wen Kai	21	21
(Hong Kong) Hu Yun	15	21	27
6	(Thailand) Boonsak Ponsana	21	6	25
(Chinese Taipei) Hsieh Yu-hsing	14	15
(France) Brice Leverdez	21	21
(South Korea) Park Sung-hwan	11	17
4	(China) Lin Dan	21	21
Q2	(South Korea) Lee Hyun-il	21	21
(Singapore) Derek Wong	15	10
(Hong Kong) Wong Wing Ki	14	17
8	(Denmark) Jan Ø. Jørgensen	21	21
(China) Wang Zhengming	20	21	21
(Singapore) Ashton Chen Yong Zhao	22	11	7
(China) Du Pengyu	21	21
PFQ	(Japan) Rei Sato	16	8

2nd round
PFQ	(South Korea) Lee Cheol-ho	21	10	19
(Denmark) Christian Lind Thomsen	16	21	21
5	(China) Bao Chunlai	21	21
(China) Qiao Bin	15	16
3	(China) Chen Jin	18	8r
(Chinese Taipei) Chou Tien-chen	21	16
7	(China) Chen Long	21	21
(Indonesia) Dionysius Hayom Rumbaka	12	10
Q3	(China) Wen Kai	12	16
(Hong Kong) Hu Yun	21	21
(France) Brice Leverdez	14	16
4	(China) Lin Dan	21	21
Q2	(South Korea) Lee Hyun-il	21	13	21
8	(Denmark) Jan Ø. Jørgensen	6	21	19
(China) Wang Zhengming	21	22
(China) Du Pengyu	18	20

Quarterfinals
(Denmark) Christian Lind Thomsen	15	16
5	(China) Bao Chunlai	21	21
(Chinese Taipei) Chou Tien-chen	12	11
7	(China) Chen Long	21	21
(Hong Kong) Hu Yun	20	15
4	(China) Lin Dan	22	21
Q2	(South Korea) Lee Hyun-il	18	17
(China) Wang Zhengming	21	21

Semifinals
5	(China) Bao Chunlai	18	12
7	(China) Chen Long	21	21
Finals
7	(China) Chen Long	15	21	14
4	(China) Lin Dan	21	13	21
4	(China) Lin Dan	21	21
(China) Wang Zhengming	12	17

== Women's singles ==
=== Seeds ===
1. (China) Wang Yihan
2. (China) Wang Xin
3. (China) Wang Shixian
4. (Denmark) Tine Baun
5. (France) Pi Hongyan
6. (China) Jiang Yanjiao
7. (South Korea) Bae Youn-joo
8. (China) Wang Lin

=== Results ===
1st round
1	(China) Wang Yihan	21	21
(Chinese Taipei) Pai Hsiao-ma	15	13
(Indonesia) Adrianti Firdasari	16	13
(China) Li Xuerui	21	21
8	(China) Wang Lin	21	18	14r
(Indonesia) Maria Febe Kusumastuti	5	21	8
Q1	(China) Xia Jingyun	21	21
(Switzerland) Jeanine Cicognini	19	12
4	(Denmark) Tine Baun	21	21
(Japan) Megumi Taruno	14	12
Q4	(China) Chen Xiaojia	18	21	21
Q2	(South Korea) Hwang Hye-youn	21	16	7
5	(France) Pi Hongyan	21	17	21
(Singapore) Gu Juan	15	21	19
(Singapore) Fu Mingtian	22	21
(Japan) Ayane Kurihara	20	13
(China) Lu Lan	21	21
(Singapore) Xing Aiying	8	7
(Singapore) Chen Jiayuan	11	10
7	(South Korea) Bae Youn-joo	21	21
(Thailand) Salakjit Ponsana	18	21	21
Q3	(China) Zhou Hui	21	9	8
(South Korea) Bae Seung-hee	9	10
3	(China) Wang Shixian	21	21
(Japan) Shizuka Uchida	w/o
PFQ	(Macau) Wang Rong
(Chinese Taipei) Hung Shih Han	18	12
6	(China) Jiang Yanjiao	21	21
(Thailand) Porntip Buranaprasertsuk	9	14
(South Korea) Sung Ji-hyun	21	21
(South Korea) Kim Moon-hi	10	17
2	(China) Wang Xin	21	21

2nd round
1	(China) Wang Yihan	17	21	21
(China) Li Xuerui	21	9	13
(Indonesia) Maria Febe Kusumastuti	15	9
Q1	(China) Xia Jingyun	21	21
4	(Denmark) Tine Baun	21	23
Q4	(China) Chen Xiaojia	16	21
5	(France) Pi Hongyan	21	22
(Singapore) Fu Mingtian	17	20
(China) Lu Lan	21	21
7	(South Korea) Bae Youn-joo	8	14
(Thailand) Salakjit Ponsana	18	21	17
3	(China) Wang Shixian	21	13	21
(Japan) Shizuka Uchida	7	10
6	(China) Jiang Yanjiao	21	21
(South Korea) Sung Ji-hyun	14	21	9
2	(China) Wang Xin	21	11	21

Quarterfinals
1	(China) Wang Yihan	21	18	21
Q1	(China) Xia Jingyun	9	21	9
4	(Denmark) Tine Baun	21	21
5	(France) Pi Hongyan	8	17
(China) Lu Lan	13	14
3	(China) Wang Shixian	21	21
6	(China) Jiang Yanjiao	19	21	21
2	(China) Wang Xin	21	16	23

Semifinals
1	(China) Wang Yihan	16	19
4	(Denmark) Tine Baun	21	21
Finals
4	(Denmark) Tine Baun	13	9
2	(China) Wang Xin	21	21
3	(China) Wang Shixian	11	15
2	(China) Wang Xin	21	21

== Men's doubles ==
=== Seeds ===
1. (Chinese Taipei) Fang Chieh-min / Lee Sheng-mu
2. (China) Guo Zhendong / Xu Chen
3. (South Korea) Jung Jae-sung / Lee Yong-dae
4. (Chinese Taipei) Ko Sung-hyun / Yoo Yeon-seong
5. (China) Cai Yun / Fu Haifeng
6. (South Korea) Cho Gun-woo / Kwon Yi-goo
7. (South Korea) Kim Ki-jung / Shin Baek-cheol
8. (China) Chai Biao / Zhang Nan

=== Result ===
Quarterfinals
(Malaysia) Goh Wei Shem (Malaysia) Teo Kok Siang	18	14
(Malaysia) Chan Peng Soon (Malaysia) Lim Khim Wah	21	21
4	(South Korea) Ko Sung-hyun (South Korea) Yoo Yeon-seong	21	12	21
(China) Liu Xiaolong (China) Qiu Zihan	14	21	10
(Malaysia) Choong Tan Fook (Malaysia) Lee Wan Wah	6	11
3	(South Korea) Jung Jae-sung (South Korea) Lee Yong-dae	21	21
5	(China) Cai Yun (China) Fu Haifeng	21	21
2	(China) Guo Zhendong (China) Xu Chen	11	16

Semifinals
(Malaysia) Chan Peng Soon (Malaysia) Lim Khim Wah	18	10
4	(South Korea) Ko Sung-hyun (South Korea) Yoo Yeon-seong	21	21
3	(South Korea) Jung Jae-sung (South Korea) Lee Yong-dae	22	13	17
5	(China) Cai Yun (China) Fu Haifeng	20	21	21

Finals
4	(South Korea) Ko Sung-hyun (South Korea) Yoo Yeon-seong	14	19
5	(China) Cai Yun (China) Fu Haifeng	21	21

== Women's doubles ==
=== Seeds ===
1. (Chinese Taipei) Cheng Wen-hsing / Chien Yu-chin
2. (China) Cheng Shu / Zhao Yunlei
3. (Bulgaria) Petya Nedelcheva / Anastasia Russkikh
4. (Singapore) Shinta Mulia Sari / Yao Lei
5. (China) Wang Xiaoli / Yu Yang
6. (South Korea) Kim Min-jung / Lee Hyo-jung
7. (China) Pan Pan / Tian Qing
8. (Indonesia) Meiliana Jauhari / Greysia Polii

=== Results ===
Quarterfinals
1	(Chinese Taipei) Cheng Wen-hsing (Chinese Taipei) Chien Yu-chin	19	21	21
8	(Indonesia) Meiliana Jauhari (Indonesia) Greysia Polii	21	14	18
(China) Bao Yixin (China) Lu Lu	w/o
7	(China) Pan Pan (China) Tian Qing
5	(China) Wang Xiaoli (China) Yu Yang	21	21
(China) Ma Jin (China) Zhong Qianxin	19	18
6	(South Korea) Kim Min-jung (South Korea) Lee Hyo-jung	20	18
2	(China) Cheng Shu (China) Zhao Yunlei	22	21

Semifinals
1	(Chinese Taipei) Cheng Wen-hsing (Chinese Taipei) Chien Yu-chin	17	21	17
(China) Bao Yixin (China) Lu Lu	21	11	21
5	(China) Wang Xiaoli (China) Yu Yang	21	21
2	(China) Cheng Shu (China) Zhao Yunlei	18	16

Finals
(China) Bao Yixin (China) Lu Lu	8	8
5	(China) Wang Xiaoli (China) Yu Yang	21	21

== Mixed doubles ==
=== Seeds ===
1. (Indonesia) Nova Widianto / Lilyana Natsir
2. (Thailand) Songphon Anugritayawon / Kunchala Voravichitchaikul
3. (Thailand) Sudket Prapakamol / Saralee Thungthongkam
4. (Chinese Taipei) Lee Sheng-Mu / Chien Yu-Chin
5. (Chinese Taipei) Chen Hung-Ling / Cheng Wen-Hsing
6. (Denmark) Joachim Fischer Nielsen / Christinna Pedersen
7. (China) Tao Jiaming / Tian Qing
8. (China) He Hanbin / Ma Jin

=== Results ===
Quarterfinals
1	(Indonesia) Nova Widianto (Indonesia) Lilyana Natsir	21	19	22
6	(Denmark) Joachim Fischer Nielsen (Denmark) Christinna Pedersen	12	21	20
3	(Thailand) Sudket Prapakamol (Thailand) Saralee Thungthongkam	18	21	19
(China) Xu Chen (China) Yu Yang	21	14	21
7	(China) Tao Jiaming (China) Tian Qing	21	21
(China) Liu Peixuan (China) Tang Jinhua	14	10
8	(China) He Hanbin (China) Ma Jin	21	21
(China) Shen Ye (China) Wang Xiaoli	10	11

Semifinals
1	(Indonesia) Nova Widianto (Indonesia) Lilyana Natsir	11	17
(China) Xu Chen (China) Yu Yang	21	21
7	(China) Tao Jiaming (China) Tian Qing	7	21	21
8	(China) He Hanbin (China) Ma Jin	21	12	14

Finals
(China) Xu Chen (China) Yu Yang	11	14
7	(China) Tao Jiaming (China) Tian Qing	21	21

Preceded by 2009 China Masters Super Series	China Masters Super Series	Succeeded by 2011 China Masters Super Series
Preceded by 2010 Indonesia Open Super Series	BWF Super Series	Succeeded by 2010 Japan Open Super Series
