= 2010 Denmark Super Series =

The 2010 Denmark Open Super Series was a top level badminton competition which was held from October 26, 2010, to October 31, 2010, in Odense, Denmark. It was the ninth BWF Super Series competition on the 2010 BWF Super Series schedule. The total purse for the event was $200,000.

== Men's singles ==
1. (Denmark) Peter Gade
2. (Indonesia) Taufik Hidayat
3. (Thailand) Boonsak Ponsana
4. (Denmark) Jan Ø. Jørgensen
5. (Japan) Kenichi Tago
6. (Germany) Marc Zwiebler
7. (England) Rajiv Ouseph
8. (Hong Kong) Hu Yun

=== Top half ===
First Round
1	(Denmark) P Gade
(Hong Kong) Wong W K	w/o
(Poland) P Wacha	21	23
(Denmark) C Lind Thomsen	13	21
8	(Hong Kong) Hu Y	15	21	21
(India) C Anand	15	16
(Netherlands) D Palyama	21	14	10
Q2	(Malaysia) Liew DR	19	21	21
4	(Denmark) J Ø Jørgensen	21	18	21
(Hong Kong) Chan Y K	15	21	14
(France) M L Y Ping	15	10
Q4	(Denmark) V Axelsen	21	21
(Germany) M Zwiebler	21	22
(Estonia) R Must	16	20
(Denmark) H-K Vittinghus	21	17	22
(India) A Pawar	16	21	24

Second Round
(Hong Kong) Wong W K	21	11	11
(Poland) P Wacha	17	21	21
8	(Hong Kong) Hu Y	21	21
Q2	(Malaysia) Liew DR	12	15
4	(Denmark) J Ø Jørgensen	21	21
Q4	(Denmark) V Axelsen	14	16
6	(Germany) M Zwiebler	21	14	21
(India) A Pawar	10	21	15

Quarterfinals
(Poland) P Wacha	23	10
8	(Hong Kong) Hu Y	25	21
4	(Denmark) J Ø Jørgensen	21	21
6	(Germany) M Zwiebler	16	19

Semifinals
8	(Hong Kong) Hu Y	12	17
4	(Denmark) J Ø Jørgensen	21	21

=== Bottom half ===
First Round
(China) Du PY	1
(Czech Republic) P Koukal	0^{r}
(Lithuania) K Navickas	17	21	21
7	(England) R Ouseph	21	14	16
(Republic of Ireland) S Evans	11	20
(India) K Parupalli	21	22
(Japan) K Yamada	13	26	15
3	(Thailand) B Ponsana	21	24	21
(Japan) S Sasaki	21	21
Q3	(Germany) M Reuter	13	15
(Denmark) R Ulsing	14	11
5	(Japan) K Tago	21	21
(Denmark) J Persson	21	21
(England) C Baxter	16	17
Q1	(Denmark) E Vind	14	14
2	(Indonesia) T Hidayat	21	21

Second Round
(China) Du PY	21	21
(Lithuania) K Navickas	16	19
(India) K Parupalli	21	21
3	(Thailand) B Ponsana	9	19
(Japan) S Sasaki	14	17
5	(Japan) K Tago	21	21
(Denmark) J Persson	15	19
2	(Indonesia) T Hidayat	21	21

Quarterfinals
(China) Du PY	21	21
(India) K Parupalli	13	17
5	(Japan) K Tago	19	19
2	(Indonesia) T Hidayat	21	21

Semifinals
(China) Du PY	15	21	17
2	(Indonesia) T Hidayat	21	17	21

=== Final ===
Final
4	(Denmark) Jan Ø. Jørgensen	21	21
2	(Indonesia) Taufik Hidayat	19	19

== Women's singles ==
1. (China) Wang Yihan
2. (Denmark) Tine Baun
3. (France) Pi Hongyan
4. (Japan) Eriko Hirose
5. (Netherlands) Yao Jie
6. (Germany) Juliane Schenk
7. (Hong Kong) Yip Pui Yin
8. (Russia) Ella Diehl

=== Top half ===
First Round
1	(China) Wang YH	18	21	21
(Switzerland) J Cicognini	21	12	4
(Bulgaria) L Zetchiri	21	20	21
(New Zealand) M Chan	19	22	19
6	(Germany) J Schenk	15	21	21
(Japan) S Sato	21	15	14
(Japan) Y Hirayama	14	13
(China) Li XR	21	21
3	(France) Pi HY	18	13
(Bulgaria) P Nedelcheva	21	21
(Ukraine) E Prus	11	21	18
(Czech Republic) K Ludíková	21	17	21
5	(Netherlands) Yao J	21	21
Q4	(Denmark) C Martens	16	11
(England) E Cann	21	17	17
(Russia) A Prokopenko	14	21	21

Second Round
1	(China) Wang YH	21	21
(Bulgaria) L Zetchiri	11	9
6	(Germany) J Schenk	20	20
(China) Li XR	22	22
(Bulgaria) P Nedelcheva	21	17	21
(Czech Republic) K Ludíková	8	21	19
5	(Netherlands) Yao J	21	21
(Russia) A Prokopenko	15	17

Quarterfinals
1	(China) Wang YH	13	21	21
(China) Li XR	21	16	7
(Bulgaria) P Nedelcheva	21	14	21
5	(Netherlands) Yao J	7	21	14

Semifinals
1	(China) Wang YH	21	21
(Bulgaria) P Nedelcheva	8	10

=== Bottom half ===
First Round
Q3	(Germany) C Bott	21	10	11
(Chinese Taipei) Tai T-y	18	21	21
(Hong Kong) Chan T K	17	14
8	(Russia) E Diehl	21	21
(Scotland) S Egelstaff	11	12
Q2	(China) Zhu L	21	21
Q1	(China) Liu X	21	21
4	(Japan) E Hirose	15	11
(Ukraine) L Griga	21	10	16
(Japan) A Goto	17	21	21
(Germany) K Schnaase	19	9
7	(Hong Kong) Yip P Y	21	21
(Belarus) O Konon	21	21	15
(Thailand) S Ponsana	18	23	21
(Thailand) P Buranaprasertsuk	15	8
2	(Denmark) T Baun	21	21

Second Round
(Chinese Taipei) Tai T-y	16	21	12
8	(Russia) E Diehl	21	19	21
Q2	(China) Zhu L	21	18	19
Q1	(China) Liu X	18	21	21
(Japan) A Goto	21	21
7	(Hong Kong) Yip P Y	8	17
(Thailand) S Ponsana	21	22
2	(Denmark) T Baun	16	20

Quarterfinals
8	(Russia) E Diehl	17	21	12
Q1	(China) Liu X	21	16	21
(Japan) A Goto	15	15
(Thailand) S Ponsana	21	21

Semifinals
Q1	(China) Liu X	21	21
(Thailand) S Ponsana	19	18

=== Final ===
Final
1	(China) Wang Yihan	21	21
Q1	(China) Liu Xin	14	12

== Men's doubles ==
1. (Denmark) Mathias Boe / Carsten Mogensen
2. (Indonesia) Markis Kido / Hendra Setiawan
3. (Indonesia) Alvent Yulianto Chandra / Hendra Aprida Gunawan
4. (Japan) Hirokatsu Hashimoto / Noriyasu Hirata
5. (England) Anthony Clark / Nathan Robertson (withdrew)
6. (Denmark) Mads Conrad-Petersen / Jonas Rasmussen
7. (Hong Kong) Yohan Hadikusumo Wiratama / Wong Wai Hong
8. (Japan) Hiroyuki Endo / Kenichi Hayakawa

=== Top half ===
First Round
1	(Denmark) M Boe (Denmark) C Mogensen	21	21
(Malaysia) Goh W S (Malaysia) Teo K S	13	19
(Denmark) R Bonde (Denmark) A Kristiansen	21	21
(England) C Langridge (England) R Middleton	12	18
7	(Hong Kong) Y H Wiratama (Hong Kong) Wong W H	17	15
(Malaysia) Mak H C (Malaysia) Tan W K	21	21
(France) L Constantin (France) S Vincent	14	7
(Denmark) M Elbjorn Larsen (Denmark) C Skovgård	21	21
4	(Japan) H Hashimoto (Japan) N Hirata	21	21
Q3	(Denmark) R Fladberg (Denmark) K Astrup Sorensen	14	13
(France) B Careme (France) S Grosjean	22	16
(Germany) I Kindervater (Germany) J Schöttler	24	21
PFQ	(Japan) Y Hirobe (Japan) K Kazuno	16	21	21
(Republic of Ireland) S Magee (Republic of Ireland) T Stephenson	21	15	13
PFQ	(Chinese Taipei) Chen C-j (Chinese Taipei) Lin Y-j	12	10
(Malaysia) M F M Tazari (Malaysia) Ong S H	21	21

Second Round
1	(Denmark) M Boe (Denmark) C Mogensen	21	21
(Denmark) R Bonde (Denmark) A Kristiansen	15	18
(Malaysia) Mak H C (Malaysia) Tan W K	18	21	21
(Denmark) M Elbjorn Larsen (Denmark) C Skovgård	21	19	15
4	(Japan) H Hashimoto (Japan) N Hirata	21	21
(Germany) I Kindervater (Germany) J Schöttler	15	17
PFQ	(Japan) Y Hirobe (Japan) K Kazuno	21	17	18
(Malaysia) M F M Tazari (Malaysia) Ong S H	15	21	9^{r}

Quarterfinals
1	(Denmark) M Boe (Denmark) C Mogensen	21	21
(Malaysia) Mak H C (Malaysia) Tan W K	16	12
4	(Japan) H Hashimoto (Japan) N Hirata	21	19	20
PFQ	(Japan) Y Hirobe (Japan) K Kazuno	17	21	22

Semifinals
1	(Denmark) M Boe (Denmark) C Mogensen	21	21
PFQ	(Japan) Y Hirobe (Japan) K Kazuno	11	16

=== Bottom half ===
First Round
(Russia) V Durkin (Russia) A Nikolaenko	21	22
(Thailand) S Anugritayawon (Thailand) S Prapakamol	18	20
(Denmark) K Henriksen (Denmark) M Pieler Kolding	12	10
8	(Japan) H Endo (Japan) K Hayakawa	21	21
(United States) P Chew (United States) H H Ho	8	16
(Netherlands) R Bosch (Netherlands) K Ridder	21	21
(Poland) A Cwalina (Poland) M Łogosz	16	18
3	(Indonesia) A Y Chandra (Indonesia) H A Gunawan	21	21
(Croatia) Z Durkinjak (Croatia) Z Hoelbling	21	20	13
Q1	(Germany) M Fuchs (Germany) O Roth	16	22	21
(Indonesia) F Limpele (Denmark) S Mollyhus	14	18
6	(Denmark) M Conrad-Petersen (Denmark) J Rasmussen	21	21
Q4	(England) C Adcock (England) A Ellis	21	21
Q2	(Denmark) M Skroeder Boedskov (Denmark) J Staael	17	18
(Japan) N Kawamae (Japan) S Sato	17	19
2	(Indonesia) M Kido (Indonesia) H Setiawan	21	21

Second Round
(Russia) V Durkin (Russia) A Nikolaenko	19	18
8	(Japan) H Endo (Japan) K Hayakawa	21	21
(Netherlands) R Bosch (Netherlands) K Ridder	21	25	12
3	(Indonesia) A Y Chandra (Indonesia) H A Gunawan	17	27	21
Q1	(Germany) M Fuchs (Germany) O Roth	23	21
6	(Denmark) M Conrad-Petersen (Denmark) J Rasmussen	21	16
Q4	(England) C Adcock (England) A Ellis	23	15
2	(Indonesia) M Kido (Indonesia) H Setiawan	25	21

Quarterfinals
8	(Japan) H Endo (Japan) K Hayakawa	17	21	21
3	(Indonesia) A Y Chandra (Indonesia) H A Gunawan	21	13	19
Q1	(Germany) M Fuchs (Germany) O Roth	19	18
2	(Indonesia) M Kido (Indonesia) H Setiawan	21	21

Semifinals
8	(Japan) H Endo (Japan) K Hayakawa	15	16
2	(Indonesia) M Kido (Indonesia) H Setiawan	21	21

=== Final ===
Final
1	(Denmark) Mathias Boe (Denmark) Carsten Mogensen	21	21
2	(Indonesia) Markis Kido (Indonesia) Hendra Setiawan	13	12

== Women's doubles ==
1. (Japan) Miyuki Maeda / (Japan) Satoko Suetsuna
2. (Japan) Mizuki Fujii / (Japan) Reika Kakiiwa
3. (Bulgaria) Petya Nedelcheva / (Russia) Anastasia Russkikh
4. (Russia) Valeria Sorokina / (Russia) Nina Vislova
5. (Thailand) Duanganong Aroonkesorn / (Thailand) Kunchala Voravichitchaikul
6. (Japan) Shizuka Matsuo / (Japan) Mami Naito
7. (Netherlands) Lotte Jonathans / (Netherlands) Paulien van Dooremalen
8. (Germany) Sandra Marinello / (Germany) Birgit Overzier

=== Top half ===
First Round
(Indonesia) V Marissa (Indonesia) N Melati	21	21
(Denmark) A Madsen (Denmark) J van Zaane	10	8
8	(Germany) S Marinello (Germany) B Overzier	21	21
(Denmark) T Christiansen (Denmark) L Tang Sorsensen	13	8
(Denmark) L Frier Kristiansen (Denmark) M Rœpke	21	21
(Germany) C Bott (Germany) K Schnaase	18	10
4	(Russia) V Sorokina (Russia) N Vislova	21	21
(Hong Kong) Chan T K (Hong Kong) Chau H W	18	15
(Denmark) J Christiansen (Denmark) L Grebak
(France) L Choinet (France) W Rasidi	w/o
5	(Thailand) D Aroonkesorn (Thailand) K Voravichitchaikul	21	22
(Denmark) A Fangel (Denmark) K Sorensen	12	20
(Denmark) M Sejr Nielsen (Denmark) S Thygesen	11	14
(England) J Wallwork (England) G White	21	21

Second Round
1	(Japan) M Maeda (Japan) S Suetsuna	21	21
(Indonesia) V Marissa (Indonesia) N Melati	9	9
8	(Germany) S Marinello (Germany) B Overzier	21	14	18
(Denmark) L Frier Kristiansen (Denmark) M Rœpke	17	21	21
4	(Russia) V Sorokina (Russia) N Vislova	21	21
(France) L Choinet (France) W Rasidi	13	14
5	(Thailand) D Aroonkesorn (Thailand) K Voravichitchaikul	15	21	21
(England) J Wallwork (England) G White	21	16	14

Quarterfinals
1	(Japan) M Maeda (Japan) S Suetsuna	20	21	21
(Denmark) L Frier Kristiansen (Denmark) M Rœpke	22	10	15
4	(Russia) V Sorokina (Russia) N Vislova	22	21
5	(Thailand) D Aroonkesorn (Thailand) K Voravichitchaikul	20	13

Semifinals
1	(Japan) M Maeda (Japan) S Suetsuna	21	21
4	(Russia) V Sorokina (Russia) N Vislova	11	9

=== Bottom half ===
First Round
(Germany) I Herttrich (Germany) I Wienefeld	18	17
(Denmark) C Juel (Denmark) C Martens	21	21
(Denmark) K Rytter Juhl (Denmark) C Pedersen	17	12
6	(Japan) S Matsuo (Japan) M Naito	21	21
(Denmark) L Damkjær Kruse (Denmark) M Schjott-Kristensen	21	21
(United States) E Lee (United States) P L Obanana	18	11
(Denmark) M Helsbol (Denmark) A Skelbæk	21	14	17
3	(Bulgaria) P Nedelcheva (Russia) A Russkikh	19	21	21
(Denmark) F Sonderby Christensen (Denmark) L Clausen	9	21
(England) M Agathangelou (England) H Olver	21	23
(Denmark) S-M Jensen (Denmark) L Kjærsfeldt	21	19	14
7	(Netherlands) L Jonathans (Netherlands) P van Dooremalen	18	21	21
(Japan) M Matsutomo (Japan) A Takahashi	21	21
(Denmark) C Ågård Andersen (Denmark) L Hansen	9	10

Second Round
(Denmark) C Juel (Denmark) C Martens	5	8
6	(Japan) S Matsuo (Japan) M Naito	21	21
(Denmark) L Damkjær Kruse (Denmark) M Schjott-Kristensen	13	10
3	(Bulgaria) P Nedelcheva (Russia) A Russkikh	21	21
(England) M Agathangelou (England) H Olver	21	16	12
7	(Netherlands) L Jonathans (Netherlands) P van Dooremalen	17	21	21
(Japan) M Matsutomo (Japan) A Takahashi	16	26
2	(Japan) M Fujii (Japan) R Kakiiwa	21	28

Quarterfinals
6	(Japan) S Matsuo (Japan) M Naito	21	21
3	(Bulgaria) P Nedelcheva (Russia) A Russkikh	18	13
7	(Netherlands) L Jonathans (Netherlands) P van Dooremalen	17	14
2	(Japan) M Fujii (Japan) R Kakiiwa	21	21

Semifinals
6	(Japan) S Matsuo (Japan) M Naito	22	21	11
2	(Japan) M Fujii (Japan) R Kakiiwa	24	19	5^{r}

=== Final ===
Final
1	(Japan) Miyuki Maeda (Japan) Satoko Suetsuna	21	21
6	(Japan) Shizuka Matsuo (Japan) Mami Naito	17	14

== Mixed doubles ==
1. (Poland) Robert Mateusiak / Nadiezda Zieba
2. (Indonesia) Hendra Aprida Gunawan / Vita Marissa
3. (Denmark) Thomas Laybourn / Kamilla Rytter Juhl
4. (Thailand) Sudket Prapakamol / Saralee Thoungthongkam
5. (Denmark) Joachim Fischer Nielsen / Christinna Pedersen
6. (England) Nathan Robertson / Jenny Wallwork
7. (Germany) Michael Fuchs / Birgit Overzier
8. (Thailand) Songphon Anugritayawon / Kunchala Voravichitchaikul

=== Top half ===
First Round
1	(Poland) R Mateusiak (Poland) N Zieba	9	21	21
PFQ	(Indonesia) H Setiawan (Russia) A Russkikh	21	11	17
(Denmark) M Delbo Larsen (Denmark) M Schjott-Kristensen	21	21
(Ukraine) V Atrashchenkov (Ukraine) E Prus	16	5
6	(England) N Robertson (England) J Wallwork	21	21
(Poland) W Szuklarczyk (Poland) A Wojtkowska	17	12
Q3	(Denmark) M Pieler Kolding (Denmark) J Houmann	16	21	21
(Hong Kong) Wong W H (Hong Kong) Chau H W	21	18	17
4	(Thailand) S Prapakamol (Thailand) S Thoungthongkam	21	21
(Poland) A Cwalina (Poland) M Kurdelska	13	14
(Japan) H Hashimoto (Japan) M Maeda	21	21
Q4	(Japan) Y Hirobe (Japan) M Matsutomo	16	16
5	(Denmark) J Fischer Nielsen (Denmark) C Pedersen	23	21
(Croatia) Z Durkinjak (Croatia) S Poznanovic	21	19
(Indonesia) T K Wardana (Indonesia) N Melati	29	22
(Japan) N Hirata (Japan) M Fujii	30	24

Second Round
1	(Poland) R Mateusiak (Poland) N Zieba	21	21
(Denmark) M Delbo Larsen (Denmark) M Schjott-Kristensen	12	9
6	(England) N Robertson (England) J Wallwork	21	21
Q3	(Denmark) M Pieler Kolding (Denmark) J Houmann	15	17
4	(Thailand) S Prapakamol (Thailand) S Thoungthongkam	25	21
(Japan) H Hashimoto (Japan) M Maeda	23	16
5	(Denmark) J Fischer Nielsen (Denmark) C Pedersen	21	16	21
(Japan) N Hirata (Japan) M Fujii	13	21	19

Quarterfinals
1	(Poland) R Mateusiak (Poland) N Zieba	14	21	20
6	(England) N Robertson (England) J Wallwork	21	17	22
4	(Thailand) S Prapakamol (Thailand) S Thoungthongkam	21	21
5	(Denmark) J Fischer Nielsen (Denmark) C Pedersen	15	15

Semifinals
6	(England) N Robertson (England) J Wallwork	21	18	21
4	(Thailand) S Prapakamol (Thailand) S Thoungthongkam	16	21	16

=== Bottom half ===
First Round
(Japan) K Hayakawa (Japan) S Matsuo	21	21
Q2	(Netherlands) R Bosch (Netherlands) L Jonathans	9	7
(Indonesia) F Limpele (Netherlands) Yao J	w/o
8	(Thailand) S Anugritayawon (Thailand) K Voravichitchaikul
(Russia) V Durkin (Russia) N Vislova	21	21
(Germany) J Schöttler (Germany) S Marinello	10	14
(Russia) A Nikolaenko (Russia) V Sorokina	10	21	15
3	(Denmark) T Laybourn (Denmark) K Rytter Juhl	21	14	21
(France) B Careme (France) L Choinet	20	19
(Japan) K Kazuno (Japan) R Kakiiwa	22	21
Q1	(Chinese Taipei) Lin Y-j (Chinese Taipei) Pai H-m	11	17
7	(Germany) M Fuchs (Germany) B Overzier	21	21
(Japan) S Ikeda (Japan) R Shiota	21	21
(Denmark) C Skovgård (Denmark) B Andersen	19	13
(Hong Kong) Y H Wiratama (Hong Kong) Tse Y S	12	11
2	(Indonesia) H A Gunawan (Indonesia) V Marissa	21	21

Second Round
(Japan) K Hayakawa (Japan) S Matsuo	18	16
8	(Thailand) S Anugritayawon (Thailand) K Voravichitchaikul	21	21
(Russia) V Durkin (Russia) N Vislova	15	18
3	(Denmark) T Laybourn (Denmark) K Rytter Juhl	21	21
(Japan) K Kazuno (Japan) R Kakiiwa	15	15
7	(Germany) M Fuchs (Germany) B Overzier	21	21
(Japan) S Ikeda (Japan) R Shiota	21	19	12
2	(Indonesia) H A Gunawan (Indonesia) V Marissa	17	21	21

Quarterfinals
8	(Thailand) S Anugritayawon (Thailand) K Voravichitchaikul	13	10
3	(Denmark) T Laybourn (Denmark) K Rytter Juhl	21	21
7	(Germany) M Fuchs (Germany) B Overzier	17	21	15
2	(Indonesia) H A Gunawan (Indonesia) V Marissa	21	15	21

Semifinals
3	(Denmark) T Laybourn (Denmark) K Rytter Juhl	21	21
2	(Indonesia) H A Gunawan (Indonesia) V Marissa	19	11

=== Final ===
Final
6	(England) Nathan Robertson (England) Jenny Wallwork	12	21	9
3	(Denmark) Thomas Laybourn (Denmark) Kamilla Rytter Juhl	21	12	21

Preceded by 2009 Denmark Super Series	Denmark Super Series	Succeeded by 2011 Denmark Super Series Premier
Preceded by 2010 Japan Super Series	2010 BWF Super Series	Succeeded by 2010 French Super Series
