= 2010 Malaysia Super Series =

Badminton tournament

2010 Malaysia Open Super Series
Tournament details
- Dates: 19–24 January
- Level: Super Series
- Total prize money: US$200,000
- Venue: Putra Indoor Stadium
- Location: Kuala Lumpur, Malaysia

Champions
- Men's singles: (Malaysia) Lee Chong Wei
- Women's singles: (China) Wang Xin
- Men's doubles: (Malaysia) Koo Kien Keat (Malaysia) Tan Boon Heong
- Women's doubles: (China) Du Jing (China) Yu Yang
- Mixed doubles: (China) Tao Jiaming (China) Zhang Yawen

The 2010 Malaysia Open Super Series was a badminton tournament which took place at Putra Indoor Stadium in Kuala Lumpur, Malaysia from 19 to 24 January 2010 and had a total purse of $200,000.

The 2010 Malaysia Open Super Series was the second tournament of the 2010 BWF Super Series and also part of the Malaysia Open championships, which had been held since 1937. This tournament was organized by the Badminton Association of Malaysia with the sanction of the BWF.

== Men's singles ==
=== Seeds ===
1. Lee Chong Wei (MAS)
2. Lin Dan (CHN)
3. Taufik Hidayat (INA)
4. Peter Gade (DEN)
5. Chen Jin (CHN)
6. Simon Santoso (INA)
7. Sony Dwi Kuncoro (INA)
8. Bao Chunlai (CHN)

=== Results ===
1st round
1	Lee Chong Wei (MAS)	21	21
Rajiv Ouseph (ENG)	14	4
Park Sung-hwan (KOR)	16	17
Du Pengyu (CHN)	21	21
5	Chen Jin (CHN)	23	21
Q2	Tan Chun Seang (MAS)	21	9
Joachim Persson (DEN)	21	12	16
Chan Yan Kit (HKG)	12	21	21
3	Taufik Hidayat (INA)	21	19	17
Jan Ø. Jørgensen (DEN)	7	21	21
Q1	Kazushi Yamada (JPN)	21	21
Eric Pang (NED)	19	15
8	Bao Chunlai (CHN)	21	21
Sho Sasaki (JPN)	19	15
Marc Zwiebler (GER)	23	12	15
Nguyen Tien Minh (VIE)	21	21	21
Przemysław Wacha (POL)	20	21	21
Wong Choong Hann (MAS)	22	14	11
Dicky Palyama (NED)	20	15
PFQ	Tanongsak Saensomboonsuk (THA)	22	21
Muhammad Hafiz Hashim (MAS)	19	21	14
Hsieh Yu Hsing (TPE)	21	15	21
Hu Yun (HKG)	12	17
4	Peter Gade (DEN)	21	21
Boonsak Ponsana (THA)	11	22	21
Chen Long (CHN)	21	20	14
Andrew Smith (ENG)	21	21
PFQ	Carl Baxter (ENG)	16	16
Chetan Anand (IND)	21	21
Q3	Chan Kwong Beng (MAS)	19	16
Q4	Chong Wei Feng (MAS)	21	21
PFQ	Brice Leverdez (FRA)	19	17

2nd round
1	Lee Chong Wei	21	21	21
Du Pengyu	23	17	14
5	Chen Jin	21	21
Chan Yan Kit	8	11
Jan Ø. Jørgensen	21	21
Q1	Kazushi Yamada	11	19
8	Bao Chunlai	19	21	6R
Nguyen Tien Minh	21	12	11
Przemysław Wacha	21	15	17
PFQ	Tanongsak Saensomboonsuk	19	21	21
Hsieh Yu Hsing	w/o
4	Peter Gade	w/o
Boonsak Ponsana	15	21	21
Andrew Smith	21	8	12
Chetan Anand	15	21	18
Q4	Chong Wei Feng	21	19	21

Quarterfinals
1	Lee Chong Wei	21	16	21
5	Chen Jin	14	21	15
Jan Ø. Jørgensen	17	20
Nguyen Tien Minh	21	22
PFQ	Tanongsak Saensomboonsuk	15	13
4	Peter Gade	21	21
Boonsak Ponsana	21	21
Q4	Chong Wei Feng	14	9

Semifinals
1	Lee Chong Wei	22	21
Nguyen Tien Minh	20	11
Finals
1	Lee Chong Wei (MAS)	21	21
Boonsak Ponsana (THA)	13	7
4	Peter Gade	21	12	16
Boonsak Ponsana	11	21	21

== Women's singles ==
=== Seeds ===
1. Wang Yihan (CHN)
2. Wang Lin (CHN)
3. Tine Rasmussen (DEN)
4. Zhou Mi (HKG)
5. Jiang Yanjiao (CHN)
6. Lu Lan (CHN)*
7. Saina Nehwal (IND)
8. Juliane Schenk (GER)
- Note: Lu Lan withdrew. Sung Ji-hyun of South Korea took her place in the bracket.

=== Results ===
1st round
1	Wang Yihan (CHN)	21	21
Q1	Cheng Shao-chieh (TPE)	15	8
Wang Shixian (CHN)	21	21
Sayaka Sato (JPN)	14	6
5	Jiang Yanjiao (CHN)	21	21
Yao Jie (NED)	17	18
Yip Pui Yin (HKG)	21	22
Anu Nieminen (FIN)	8	20
4	Zhou Mi (HKG)	21	7	15
Bae Youn-joo (KOR)	16	21	21
Julia Wong Pei Xian (MAS)	15	12
Salakjit Ponsana (THA)	21	21
PFQ	Sung Ji-hyun (KOR)	21	21
Linda Zechiri (BUL)	17	15
Q2	Linda Weni Fanetri (INA)	20	14
Wong Mew Choo (MAS)	22	21
Q4	Tee Jing Yi (MAS)	19	16
Ai Goto (JPN)	21	21
Q3	Yang Li Lian (MAS)	10	12
7	Saina Nehwal (IND)	21	21
Petya Nedeltcheva (BUL)	14	23	11
Wang Xin (CHN)	21	21	21
Wang Chen (HKG)	17	11
3	Tine Rasmussen (DEN)	21	21
Eriko Hirose (JPN)	21	21
Judith Meulendijks (NED)	18	14
Anita Raj Kaur (MAS)	11	10
8	Juliane Schenk (GER)	21	21
Jeanine Cicognini (SUI)	19	14
Bae Seung-hee (KOR)	21	21
Lydia Cheah Li Ya (MAS)	14	21	10
2	Wang Lin (CHN)	21	19	21

2nd round
1	Wang Yihan	21	21
Wang Shixian	11	13
5	Jiang Yanjiao	21	15	21
Yip Pui Yin	15	21	16
Bae Youn-joo	21	21
Salakjit Ponsana	16	11
PFQ	Sung Ji-hyun	12	21	21
Wong Mew Choo	21	18	17
Ai Goto	19	12
7	Saina Nehwal	21	21
Wang Xin	13	21	21
3	Tine Rasmussen	21	16	19
Eriko Hirose	21	21
8	Juliane Schenk	18	16
Bae Seung-hee	17	18
2	Wang Lin	21	21

Quarterfinals
1	Wang Yihan	21	21
5	Jiang Yanjiao	13	17
Bae Youn-joo	21	21
PFQ	Sung Ji-hyun	13	19
7	Saina Nehwal	21	8	11
Wang Xin	14	21	21
Eriko Hirose	21	15	21
2	Wang Lin	19	21	19

Semifinals
1	Wang Yihan	21	13	19
Bae Youn-joo	17	21	21
Finals
Bae Youn-joo (KOR)	21	17	6R
Wang Xin (CHN)	19	21	14
Wang Xin	21	21
Eriko Hirose	13	17

== Men's doubles ==
=== Seeds ===
1. Koo Kien Keat (MAS) / Tan Boon Heong
2. Lee Yong-dae (KOR) / Jung Jae-sung
3. Markis Kido (INA) / Hendra Setiawan
4. Alvent Yulianto (INA) / Hendra Aprida Gunawan
5. Choong Tan Fook (MAS) / Lee Wan Wah
6. Guo Zhendong (CHN) / Xu Chen
7. Anthony Clark (ENG) / Nathan Robertson
8. Chen Hung Ling (TPE) / Lin Yu Lang
- Note: Kido and Setiawan withdrew. They were replaced by Luluk Hadiyanto and Joko Riyadi.

=== Results ===
Quarterfinals
1	Koo Kien Keat (MAS); Tan Boon Heong (MAS)	21	23	21
7	Anthony Clark (ENG); Nathan Robertson (ENG)	12	25	11
Naoki Kawamae (JPN); Shoji Sato (JPN)	11	16
Chai Biao (CHN); Zhang Nan (CHN)	21	21
Tony Gunawan (USA); Howard Bach (USA)	15	18
4	Alvent Yulianto (INA); Hendra Aprida Gunawan (INA)	21	21
6	Guo Zhendong (CHN); Xu Chen (CHN)	21	23
Kenichi Hayakawa (JPN); Kenta Kazuno (JPN)	17	21

Semifinals
1	Koo Kien Keat; Tan Boon Heong	21	16	21
Chai Biao; Zhang Nan	19	21	15
4	Alvent Yulianto Chandra; Hendra Aprida Gunawan	21	13	13
6	Guo Zhendong; Xu Chen	13	21	21

Finals
1	Koo Kien Keat; Tan Boon Heong	21	17	21
6	Guo Zhendong; Xu Chen	15	21	16

== Women's doubles ==
=== Seeds ===
1. Ma Jin (CHN) / Wang Xiaoli
2. Du Jing (CHN) / Yu Yang
3. Wong Pei Tty (MAS) / Chin Eei Hui
4. Shendy Puspa Irawati (INA) / Meiliana Jauhari
5. Miyuki Maeda (JPN) / Satoko Suetsuna
6. Petya Nedeltcheva (BUL) / Anastasia Russkikh
7. Mizuki Fujii (JPN) / Reika Kakiiwa
8. Duanganong Aroonkesorn (THA) / Kunchala Voravichitchaikul
- Note: Maeda and Suetsuna withdrew. They were replaced by Lai Pei Jing and Lai Shevon Jemie of Malaysia.

=== Results ===
Quarterfinals
1	Ma Jin (CHN); Wang Xiaoli (CHN)	21	21
Kim Min-jung (KOR); Park Sun-young (KOR)	19	13
3	Wong Pei Tty (MAS); Chin Eei Hui (MAS)	21	21
Chou Chia Chi (TPE); Yang Chia Chen (TPE)	12	12
7	Mizuki Fujii (JPN); Reika Kakiiwa (JPN)	14	16
Jung Kyung-eun (KOR); Yoo Hyun Young (KOR)	21	21
6	Petya Nedeltcheva (BUL); Anastasia Russkikh (RUS)	14	5
2	Du Jing (CHN); Yu Yang (CHN)	21	21

Semifinals
1	Ma Jin; Wang Xiaoli	20	21	21
3	Wong Pei Tty; Chin Eei Hui	22	12	17
Jung Kyung-eun; Yoo Hyun Young	11	13
2	Du Jing; Yu Yang	21	21

Finals
1	Ma Jin; Wang Xiaoli	16	12
2	Du Jing; Yu Yang	21	21

== Mixed doubles ==
=== Seeds ===
1. Lee Yong-dae (KOR) / Lee Hyo-jung
2. Nova Widianto (INA) / Lilyana Natsir
3. Zheng Bo (CHN) / Ma Jin
4. Joachim Fischer Nielsen (DEN) / Christinna Pedersen
5. Hendra Aprida Gunawan (INA) / Vita Marissa
6. Songphon Anugritayawon (THA) / Kunchala Voravichitchaikul
7. Robert Mateusiak (POL) / Nadieżda Kostiuczyk
8. Sudket Prapakamol (THA) / Saralee Thoungthongkam
- Note: Zheng Bo and Ma Jin withdrew. They were replaced by Toby Ng and Grace Gao of Canada.
- Note: Nielsen and Pedersen withdrew. They were replaced by Tan Wee Kiong and Woon Khe Wei of Malaysia.

=== Results ===
Quarterfinals
Tao Jiaming (CHN); Zhang Yawen (CHN)	21	21
5	Hendra Aprida Gunawan (INA); Vita Marissa (INA)	11	14
Flandy Limpele (INA); Cheng Wen-hsing (TPE)	10	21	13
Chen Hung-ling (TPE); Chou Chia Chi (TPE)	21	19	21
Nathan Robertson (ENG); Jenny Wallwork (ENG)	11	21
Thomas Laybourn (DEN); Kamilla Rytter Juhl (DEN)	21	23
8	Sudket Prapakamol (THA); Saralee Thoungthongkam (THA)
Ko Sung-hyun (KOR); Ha Jung-eun (KOR)

Semifinals
Tao Jiaming; Zhang Yawen	21	21
Chen Hung-ling; Chou Chia Chi	7	18
Thomas Laybourn; Kamilla Rytter Juhl	21	21
8	Sudket Prapakamol; Saralee Thoungthongkam	18	18

Finals
Tao Jiaming; Zhang Yawen	19	21	21
Thomas Laybourn; Kamilla Rytter Juhl	21	18	15

Preceded by 2009 Malaysia Super Series	Malaysia Open	Succeeded by 2011 Malaysia Super Series
Preceded by 2010 Korea Open Super Series	BWF Super Series	Succeeded by 2010 All England Super Series
