= 2005 French Open (badminton) =

The 2005 French Open in badminton was held in Paris, from October 12 to October 16, 2005.

It was an A Category tournament and the prize money was US$10,000.

== Venue ==
- La Halle Georges Carpentier

== Results ==
Category	Winners	Runners-up	Score
Men's singles	(Russia) Stanislav Pukhov	(France) Arif Rasidi	15–12, 15–3
Women's singles	(France) Pi Hongyan	(Denmark) Anne-Marie Pedersen	11–1, 11–2
Men's doubles	(Denmark) Simon Mollyhus & Anders Kristiansen	(England) Chris Tonks & Chris Langridge	15–13, 15–12
Women's doubles	(France) Elodie Eymard & Weny Rahmawati	(Japan) Seiko Yamada & Shizuka Matsuo	15–12, 14–17, 15–6
Mixed doubles	(France) Nabil Lasmari & (Indonesia) Eny Widiowati	(Denmark) Jacob Chemniz & Julie Houmann	4–15, 15–7, 15–13
