= Yoshiteru Hirobe =

Japanese badminton player (born 1982)

Personal information
- Born: 8 August 1982 (age 44) Fukui Prefecture, Japan
- Height: 1.79 m (5 ft 10 in)
- Weight: 67 kg (148 lb)

Sport
- Country: Japan
- Sport: Badminton
- Handedness: Right

Men's doubles
- Highest ranking: 19 (28 July 2011)
- BWF profile
Medal record
Men's badminton
Representing Japan
Thomas Cup
Bronze medal – third place	2010 Kuala Lumpur	Men's team

Yoshiteru Hirobe (廣部好輝, Hirobe Yoshiteru; born 8 August 1982) is a Japanese badminton player, and joined the Unisys team in 2005. Hirobe graduated from the Chuo University. In 2009, he won the Osaka International Challenge tournament in the men's doubles event partnered with Hajime Komiyama. At the Superseries event, He was the semi-finalist of the 2010 Denmark and Korea Open.

== Achievements ==
=== BWF Grand Prix ===
The BWF Grand Prix had two levels, the Grand Prix and Grand Prix Gold. It was a series of badminton tournaments sanctioned by the Badminton World Federation (BWF) and played between 2007 and 2017.

Men's doubles
Year	Tournament	Partner	Opponent	Score	Result	Ref.
2010	Dutch Open	(Japan) Kenta Kazuno	(Japan) Hirokatsu Hashimoto (Japan) Noriyasu Hirata	17–21, 13–21	(silver) Runner-up	
2012	U.S. Open	(Japan) Kenta Kazuno	(Japan) Hiroyuki Endo (Japan) Kenichi Hayakawa	15–21, 10–21	(silver) Runner-up	

BWF Grand Prix Gold tournament
BWF Grand Prix tournament

=== BWF International Challenge/Series ===
Men's doubles
Year	Tournament	Partner	Opponent	Score	Result	Ref.
2009	Austrian International	(Japan) Hajime Komiyama	(Japan) Naoki Kawamae (Japan) Shoji Sato	19–21, 17–21	(silver) Runner-up	
2009	Osaka International	(Japan) Hajime Komiyama	(Japan) Hirokatsu Hashimoto (Japan) Noriyasu Hirata	21–19, 21–10	(gold) Winner	
2010	Osaka International	(Japan) Hiroyuki Endo	(Japan) Hirokatsu Hashimoto (Japan) Noriyasu Hirata	21–16, 21–23, 17–21	(silver) Runner-up	

BWF International Challenge tournament
