= Tao Jiaming =

Chinese badminton player

Tao Jiaming 陶嘉明
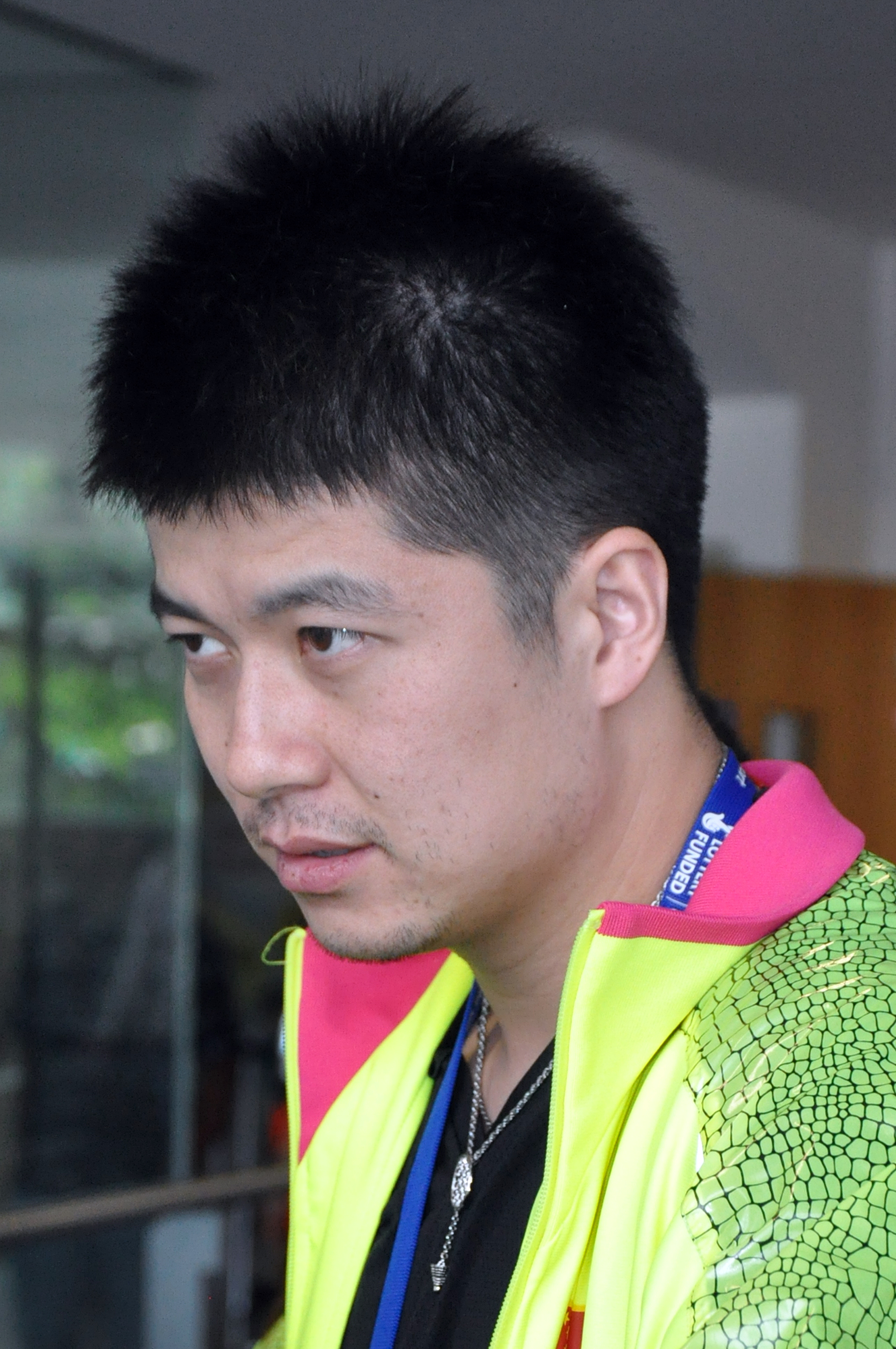

Personal information
- Born: 25 October 1985 (age 41) Nantong, Jiangsu, China
- Height: 1.86 m (6 ft 1 in)

Sport
- Country: China
- Sport: Badminton

Men's & mixed doubles
- Highest ranking: 14 (MD 18 March 2010); 2 (XD 8 September 2011)
- BWF profile
Medal record
Men's badminton
Representing China
Asian Championships
Bronze medal – third place	2009 Suwon	Mixed doubles
East Asian Games
Gold medal – first place	2009 Hong Kong	Mixed doubles
Gold medal – first place	2009 Hong Kong	Men's team
Asian Junior Championships
Bronze medal – third place	2002 Kuala Lumpur	Boys' team

Tao Jiaming (Chinese: 陶嘉明; born 25 October 1985) is a badminton player from China. He was the gold medalists at the 2009 East Asian Games in the mixed doubles and men's team events.

Tao Jiaming achieved his first major results in 2010 when he reached the mixed doubles final at the Korea Open with former partner Zhang Yawen. Since then he has played with several partners. His second partner was Tian Qing and made another Korea Open final in 2011. He is currently paired with Xia Huan. Together they reached the semifinals of the 2011 India Open. He has also competed with Wang Xiaoli and Ma Jin.

In the men's doubles he has competed with Zhang Nan, but they have not competed together often.

== Achievements ==
=== Asian Championships ===
Mixed doubles
Year	Venue	Partner	Opponent	Score	Result
2009	Suwon Indoor Stadium, Suwon, South Korea	(China) Ma Jin	(South Korea) Lee Yong-dae (South Korea) Lee Hyo-jung	16–21, 18–21	Bronze

=== East Asian Games ===
Mixed doubles
Year	Venue	Partner	Opponent	Score	Result
2009	Queen Elizabeth Stadium, Hong Kong	(China) Zhang Yawen	(China) Zhang Nan (China) Ma Jin	21–15, 21–14	Gold

=== BWF Superseries ===
The BWF Superseries, launched on 14 December 2006 and implemented in 2007, was a series of elite badminton tournaments, sanctioned by the Badminton World Federation (BWF). BWF Superseries had two levels: Superseries and Superseries Premier. A season of Superseries features twelve tournaments around the world, introduced in 2007, with successful players invited to the BWF Superseries Finals held at the year's end.

Mixed doubles
Year	Tournament	Partner	Opponent	Score	Result
2009	China Masters	(China) Wang Xiaoli	(China) Xie Zhongbo (China) Zhang Yawen	13–21, 21–19, 8–4 retired	(gold) Winner
2010	Korea Open	(China) Zhang Yawen	(China) He Hanbin (China) Yu Yang	15–21, 16–21	(silver) Runner-up
2010	Malaysia Open	(China) Zhang Yawen	(Denmark) Thomas Laybourn (Denmark) Kamilla Rytter Juhl	19–21, 21–18, 21–15	(gold) Winner
2010	China Masters	(China) Tian Qing	(China) Xu Chen (China) Yu Yang	21–11, 21–14	(gold) Winner
2010	Japan Open	(China) Tian Qing	(China) Zhang Nan (China) Zhao Yunlei	19–21, 20–22	(silver) Runner-up
2010	China Open	(China) Tian Qing	(China) Zhang Nan (China) Zhao Yunlei	21–18, 21–17	(gold) Winner
2011	Malaysia Open	(China) Tian Qing	(China) He Hanbin (China) Ma Jin	13–21, 21–13, 16–21	(silver) Runner-up
2011	Korea Open	(China) Tian Qing	(China) Zhang Nan (China) Zhao Yunlei	17–21, 21–13, 19–21	(silver) Runner-up

BWF Super Series Finals tournament
BWF Super Series Premier tournament
BWF Super Series tournament

=== BWF Grand Prix ===
The BWF Grand Prix has two levels, the Grand Prix Gold and Grand Prix. It is a series of badminton tournaments, sanctioned by the Badminton World Federation (BWF) since 2007.

Mixed doubles
Year	Tournament	Partner	Opponent	Score	Result
2012	Thailand Open	(China) Tang Jinhua	(Thailand) Sudket Prapakamol (Thailand) Saralee Thoungthongkam	21–14, 21–16	(gold) Winner

BWF Grand Prix Gold tournament
BWF Grand Prix tournament

== Record against selected opponents ==
Mixed doubles results with his most recent partner Xia Huan against Superseries Final finalists, Worlds Championships semi-finalists, and Olympic quarter finalists.

- (China) Zhang Nan & Zhao Yunlei 0–1
- (Chinese Taipei) Chen Hung-ling & Cheng Wen-hsing 0–2
- (Denmark) Joachim Fischer Nielsen & Christinna Pedersen 0–1
- (Denmark) Thomas Laybourn & Kamilla Rytter Juhl 1–0
- (South Korea) Lee Yong-dae & Ha Jung-eun 0–2
- (Thailand) Sudket Prapakamol & Saralee Thoungthongkam 1–1
