= Weny Rahmawati =

French badminton player (born 1983)

Weny Rasidi
Personal information
- Born: Weny Rahmawati; 9 October 1983 (age 42) Surabaya, Indonesia

Sport
- Country: France
- Sport: Badminton
- Handedness: Right

Women's doubles
- Highest ranking: 15 (8 July 2010)
- BWF profile

Weny Rasidi (born 9 October 1983; née Rahmawati) is a French badminton player.

== Career ==
Rahmawati is a former badminton player from Suryanaga Surabaya, Indonesia. She came to France to join the national team as a sparring partner at the age of 18, and also trained at the Chambly club. She won the women's doubles titles in 2005-2008, 2010-2011 and the mixed doubles in 2005 at the French National Championships. She also won the women's doubles title at the 2005 French Open and 2006 Cyprus International. She played the 2007 BWF World Championships in women's singles, and was defeated in the first round by Petya Nedelcheva, of Bulgaria, 21–18, 21–8.

In 2015, she was recruited as a coach at the CLTO Badminton Orléans.

== Achievements ==
Women's doubles

Year	Tournament	Partner	Result
2009
2009	Le Volant d'Or de Toulouse	Laura Choinet	Runner-up
2007
2007	Le Volant d'Or de Toulouse	Elodie Eymard	Runner-up
2007	Dutch International	Elodie Eymard	Runner-up
2006
2006	Cyprus International	Elodie Eymard	Winner
2005
2005	French Open	Elodie Eymard	Winner

Mixed doubles

Year	Tournament	Partner	Result
2004
2004	Le Volant d'Or de Toulouse	Jean-Michel Lefort	Runner-up
