= Kwon Yi-goo =

South Korean badminton player (born 1987)

Medal record

Men's badminton

Representing Republic of Korea

East Asian Games
Silver medal – second place	2009 Hong Kong	Men's team
Bronze medal – third place	2009 Hong Kong	Men's doubles

Kwon Yi-goo (born June 11, 1987) is a South Korean professional badminton player. He currently has 100 career wins, with a career doubles record of 86 wins and 56 losses. His combined career earnings equal US$29,624.

== Career ==
Kwon Yi-goo won the Vietnam Open in men's doubles with Ko Sung-hyun in 2007. At the 2007 Summer Universiade, both came fifth in doubles. In 2009 he won bronze at the East Asian Games in men's doubles with Kim Ki-jung. At the Chinese Taipei Open 2010 he finished second in doubles with Cho Gun-woo. He also took part in the 2011 World Badminton Championship.
