= Thomas Laybourn =

Danish badminton player (born 1977)

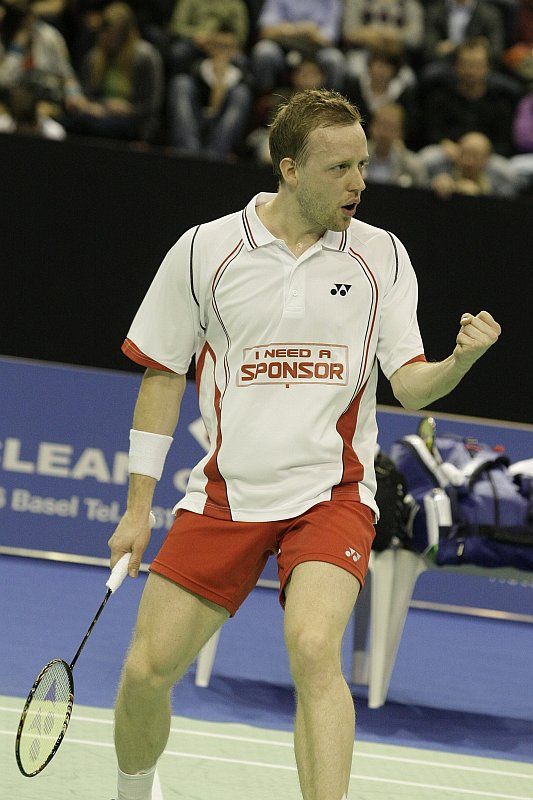
- Laybourn at the 2010 Swiss Open

Personal information
- Born: 30 September 1977 (age 49) Copenhagen, Denmark
- Height: 1.82 m (6 ft 0 in)

Sport
- Country: Denmark
- Sport: Badminton
- Handedness: Right

Mixed doubles
- Highest ranking: 1 (6 January 2011)
- BWF profile
Medal record
Men's badminton
Representing Denmark
World Championships
Gold medal – first place	2009 Hyderabad	Mixed doubles
Sudirman Cup
Silver medal – second place	2011 Qingdao	Mixed team
Bronze medal – third place	2005 Beijing	Mixed team
European Championships
Gold medal – first place	2006 Den Bosch	Mixed doubles
Gold medal – first place	2010 Manchester	Mixed doubles
Bronze medal – third place	2012 Karlskrona	Mixed doubles
European Mixed Team Championships
Gold medal – first place	2006 Den Bosch	Mixed team
Gold medal – first place	2008 Herning	Mixed team
Gold medal – first place	2009 Liverpool	Mixed team
Gold medal – first place	2011 Amsterdam	Mixed team

Thomas Laybourn (born 30 September 1977) is a retired badminton player from Denmark. He is a World Champion, two times European Champion and was ranked as world number 1 in the mixed doubles in January 2011.

== Career ==
Laybourn won the 2006 European Badminton Championships in the mixed doubles with partner Kamilla Rytter Juhl. He also competed at the 2006 IBF World Championships in mixed doubles (with Juhl), and were defeated in the quarterfinals by Nathan Robertson and Gail Emms 14–21, 17–21.

Laybourn made his first appearance at the Olympic Games in 2008 Beijing in the mixed doubles event with Juhl. They defeated Singaporean pair Hendri Kurniawan Saputra and Li Yujia in the first round, but lost to Flandy Limpele and Vita Marissa of Indonesia in the quarter-finals with a close rubber games.

His biggest success was the title in the 2009 World Championships in the mixed doubles with partner Kamilla Rytter Juhl. It was the first Danish World Championships win since 2003, when Lars Paaske and Jonas Rasmussen won the men's doubles competition.

In 2012, Laybourn played at the London Olympics, reaching the quarter-finals stage with partner Juhl. The pair beat Valiyaveetil Diju and Jwala Gutta of India, and Lee Yong-dae and Ha Jung-eun of South Korea, but were defeated by Tontowi Ahmad and Liliyana Natsir of Indonesia to stand as runners-up in Group C. They then lost to eventual gold medalists Zhang Nan and Zhao Yunlei of China in the quarter-finals in straight games. After the London Olympics, Laybourn retired from the international competitions.

Laybourn created a site named Badminton Famly to share knowledge, opinions, and tips about badminton. Badminton Famly is also active on several platforms such as YouTube, Instagram, and Facebook.

== Achievements ==
=== BWF World Championships ===
Mixed doubles

Year	Venue	Partner	Opponent	Score	Result
2009	Gachibowli Indoor Stadium, Hyderabad, India	(Denmark) Kamilla Rytter Juhl	(Indonesia) Nova Widianto (Indonesia) Liliyana Natsir	21–13, 21–17	Gold

=== European Championships ===
Mixed doubles
Year	Venue	Partner	Opponent	Score	Result
2006	Maaspoort Sports and Events; Den Bosch, Netherlands	(Denmark) Kamilla Rytter Juhl	(Denmark) Jens Eriksen (Denmark) Mette Schjoldager	22–20, 21–15	Gold
2010	Manchester Evening News Arena; Manchester, England	(Denmark) Kamilla Rytter Juhl	(Poland) Robert Mateusiak (Poland) Nadieżda Kostiuczyk	21–19, 18–21, 21–12	Gold
2012	Telenor Arena; Karlskrona, Sweden	(Denmark) Kamilla Rytter Juhl	(Denmark) Mads Pieler Kolding (Denmark) Julie Houmann	21–16, 19–21, 18–21	Bronze

=== BWF Superseries ===
The BWF Superseries, which was launched on 14 December 2006 and implemented in 2007, is a series of elite badminton tournaments, sanctioned by the Badminton World Federation (BWF). BWF Superseries levels are Superseries and Superseries Premier. A season of Superseries consists of twelve tournaments around the world that have been introduced since 2011. Successful players are invited to the Superseries Finals, which are held at the end of each year.

Mixed doubles
Year	Tournament	Partner	Opponent	Score	Result
2007	Korea Open	(Denmark) Kamilla Rytter Juhl	(China) Zheng Bo (China) Gao Ling	20–22, 19–21	(silver) Runner-up
2008	Indonesia Open	(Denmark) Kamilla Rytter Juhl	(China) Zheng Bo (China) Gao Ling	14–21, 8–21	(silver) Runner-up
2008	Denmark Open	(Denmark) Kamilla Rytter Juhl	(Denmark) Joachim Fischer Nielsen (Denmark) Christinna Pedersen	14–21, 17–21	(silver) Runner-up
2008	World Superseries Masters Finals	(Denmark) Kamilla Rytter Juhl	(Indonesia) Nova Widianto (Indonesia) Liliyana Natsir	21–19, 18–21, 22–20	(gold) Winner
2010	Malaysia Open	(Denmark) Kamilla Rytter Juhl	(China) Tao Jiaming (China) Zhang Yawen	21–19, 18–21, 15–21	(silver) Runner-up
2010	Singapore Open	(Denmark) Kamilla Rytter Juhl	(Indonesia) Nova Widianto (Indonesia) Liliyana Natsir	21–12, 21–15	(gold) Winner
2010	Denmark Open	(Denmark) Kamilla Rytter Juhl	(England) Nathan Robertson (England) Jenny Wallwork	21–12, 12–21, 21–9	(gold) Winner
2012	All England Open	(Denmark) Kamilla Rytter Juhl	(Indonesia) Tontowi Ahmad (Indonesia) Liliyana Natsir	17–21, 19–21	(silver) Runner-up

BWF Super Series Finals tournament
BWF Super Series Premier tournament
BWF Super Series tournament

=== BWF Grand Prix ===
The BWF Grand Prix had two levels, the BWF Grand Prix and Grand Prix Gold. It was a series of badminton tournaments sanctioned by the Badminton World Federation (BWF) which was held from 2007 to 2017. The World Badminton Grand Prix sanctioned by International Badminton Federation (IBF) from 1983 to 2006.

Men's doubles

Year	Tournament	Partner	Opponent	Score	Result
2004	Dutch Open	(Denmark) Peter Steffensen	(United States) Howard Bach (United States) Tony Gunawan	8–15, 7–15	(silver) Runner-up
2006	Singapore Open	(Denmark) Lars Paaske	(Indonesia) Sigit Budiarto (Indonesia) Flandy Limpele	8–21, 16–21	(silver) Runner-up

Mixed doubles
Year	Tournament	Partner	Opponent	Score	Result
2004	Dutch Open	(Denmark) Kamilla Rytter Juhl	(Denmark) Peter Steffensen (Denmark) Lena Frier Kristiansen	15–11, 15–7	(gold) Winner
2005	All England Open	(Denmark) Kamilla Rytter Juhl	(England) Nathan Robertson (England) Gail Emms	10–15, 12–15	(silver) Runner-up
2005	Thailand Open	(Denmark) Kamilla Rytter Juhl	(South Korea) Lee Jae-jin (South Korea) Lee Hyo-jung	12–15, 12–15	(silver) Runner-up
2005	Denmark Open	(Denmark) Kamilla Rytter Juhl	(Denmark) Lars Paaske (Denmark) Helle Nielsen	15–8, 15–9	(gold) Winner
2006	Macau Open	(Denmark) Kamilla Rytter Juhl	(China) Zhang Jun (China) Gao Ling	21–19, 22–20	(gold) Winner
2006	Denmark Open	(Denmark) Kamilla Rytter Juhl	(England) Anthony Clark (England) Donna Kellogg	21–14, 14–21, 20–22	(silver) Runner-up
2007	Chinese Taipei Open	(Denmark) Kamilla Rytter Juhl	(Indonesia) Flandy Limpele (Indonesia) Vita Marissa	18–21, 23–25	(silver) Runner-up
2011	Bitburger Open	(Denmark) Kamilla Rytter Juhl	(Malaysia) Chan Peng Soon (Malaysia) Goh Liu Ying	18–21, 21–14, 25–27	(silver) Runner-up
2012	German Open	(Denmark) Kamilla Rytter Juhl	(South Korea) Lee Yong-dae (South Korea) Ha Jung-eun	21–9, 21–16	(gold) Winner

BWF Grand Prix Gold tournament
BWF Grand Prix tournament

=== IBF International ===
Men's doubles

Year	Tournament	Partner	Opponent	Score	Result
2003	Finnish International	(Denmark) Jesper Thomsen	(Russia) Mikhail Kelj (Russia) Victor Maljutin	11–15, 12–15	(silver) Runner-up

Mixed doubles

Year	Tournament	Partner	Opponent	Score	Result
2001	Iceland International	(Denmark) Karina Sørensen	(England) Aqueel Bhatti (England) Emma Hendry	7–2, 7–4, 7–1	(gold) Winner
2003	Finnish International	(Denmark) Julie Houmann	(Denmark) Kasper Ødum (Denmark) Lene Mørk	11–5, 11–8	(gold) Winner

== Record against selected opponents ==
Mixed doubles results with Kamilla Rytter Juhl against Superseries Final finalists, Worlds Semi-finalists, and Olympic quarterfinalists.

- (China) He Hanbin & Yu Yang 0–1
- (China) Tao Jiaming & Zhang Yawen 0–2
- (China) Zhang Nan & Zhao Yunlei 1–0
- (China) Zheng Bo & Ma Jin 1–3
- (China) Zheng Bo & Gao Ling 0–4
- (China) Zhang Jun & Gao Ling 1–0
- (China) Xu Chen & Ma Jin 1–2
- (Chinese Taipei) Chen Hung-ling & Cheng Wen-hsing 0–1
- (Denmark) Jens Eriksen & Mette Schjoldager 2–0
- (Denmark) Joachim Fischer Nielsen & Christinna Pedersen 1–3
- (England) Nathan Robertson & Gail Emms 3–4
- (England) Anthony Clark & Donna Kellogg 1–1
- (England) Nathan Robertson & Jenny Wallwork 4–1
- (England) / (Scotland) Chris Adcock & Imogen Bankier 1–0
- (Germany) Michael Fuchs & Birgit Michels 2–2
- (India) Valiyaveetil Diju & Jwala Gutta 3–0
- (Indonesia) Flandy Limpele & Vita Marissa 1–2
- (Indonesia) / (Russia) Hendra Setiawan & Anastasia Russkikh 1–0
- (Indonesia) Nova Widianto & Liliyana Natsir 5–10
- (Indonesia) Tontowi Ahmad & Liliyana Natsir 1–3
- (Indonesia) Hendra Aprida Gunawan & Vita Marissa 2–1
- (South Korea) Ko Sung-hyun & Ha Jung-eun 1–2
- (South Korea) Lee Yong-dae & Lee Hyo-jung 1–4
- (Malaysia) Koo Kien Keat & Wong Pei Tty 2–1
- (Poland) Robert Mateusiak & Nadieżda Zięba 4–0
- (Singapore) Hendri Saputra & Li Yujia 4–0
- (Thailand) Sudket Prapakamol & Saralee Thungthongkam 4–1
