= Bae Seung-hee =

South Korean badminton player

Personal information
- Born: 20 September 1983 (age 43) Masan, Gyeongsangnam-do, South Korea
- Height: 1.63 m (5 ft 4 in)
- Weight: 53 kg (117 lb)

Sport
- Country: South Korea
- Sport: Badminton

Women's singles
- Highest ranking: 14 (24 June 2010)
- BWF profile
Medal record
Badminton
Representing South Korea
Uber Cup
Gold medal – first place	2010 Kuala Lumpur	Women's team
Asian Games
Silver medal – second place	2002 Busan	Women's team
Bronze medal – third place	2010 Guangzhou	Women's team
East Asian Games
Bronze medal – third place	2009 Hong Kong	Women's team
Asian Junior Championships
Gold medal – first place	2001 Taipei	Girls' team
Silver medal – second place	2001 Taipei	Mixed doubles
Bronze medal – third place	2001 Taipei	Girls' singles

- Bae Seung-hee
- Hangul: 배승희
- Hanja: 裵昇熙
- RR: Bae Seunghui
- MR: Pae Sŭnghŭi

Bae Seung-hee (Korean: 배승희; Hanja: 裵昇熙; born 20 September 1983) is a badminton player from South Korea. She is best remembered for her role in South Korea's first ever Uber Cup victory in 2010.

Bae was on the South Korean national team shortly after graduating from junior eligibility but from age 19 to 25, she played only for her domestic team Korea Ginseng Corporation, and competed overseas only twice between April 2003 and November 2008. She was called back to the national team after winning a national event in 2008 and in August 2009, she reached her first of two consecutive finals at the Chinese Taipei Open.

In 2010, she played first singles at the Uber Cup and in the final, beat then world #1 Wang Yihan to begin South Korea's 3–1 victory.

In 2011, Bae injured her thigh in a domestic tournament and as it caused her to miss the first part of the qualifying period for the London Olympics, she finally decided to leave international badminton at the age of 28.

== Achievements ==
=== Asian Junior Championships ===
Girls' singles
Year	Venue	Opponent	Score	Result
2001	Taipei Gymnasium; Taipei, Taiwan	(South Korea) Seo Yoon-hee		Bronze

Mixed doubles
Year	Venue	Partner	Opponent	Score	Result
2001	Taipei Gymnasium; Taipei, Taiwan	(South Korea) Hwang Ji-man	(South Korea) Lee Jae-jin (South Korea) Hwang Yu-mi	7–15, 12–15	Silver

=== BWF Grand Prix (1 title, 3 runners-up) ===
The BWF Grand Prix has two levels: Grand Prix and Grand Prix Gold. It is a series of badminton tournaments, sanctioned by Badminton World Federation (BWF) since 2007. The World Badminton Grand Prix sanctioned by International Badminton Federation (IBF) since 1983.

Women's singles
Year	Tournament	Opponent	Score	Result
2010	Chinese Taipei Open	(Chinese Taipei) Cheng Shao-chieh	11–21, 26–24, 17-21	(silver) Runner-up
2009	Chinese Taipei Open	(Chinese Taipei) Cheng Shao-chieh	21–17, 12–21, 15-21	(silver) Runner-up
2006	Vietnam Open	(Malaysia) Anita Raj Kaur	21–8, 21–18	(gold) Winner

Women's doubles
Year	Tournament	Partner	Opponent	Score	Result
2006	Vietnam Open	(South Korea) Kang Joo-young	(South Korea) Kim Jin-ock (South Korea) Lee Jung-mi	20–22, 14–21	(silver) Runner-up

BWF Grand Prix Gold tournament
BWF Grand Prix tournament

=== BWF International Challenge/Series (2 titles, 4 runners-up) ===
Women's singles
Year	Tournament	Opponent	Score	Result
2012	Indonesia International	(Indonesia) Hera Desi	16–21, 18–21	(silver) Runner-up
2009	Singapore International	(South Korea) Bae Yeon-ju	15–21, 14–21	(silver) Runner-up
2008	Malaysia International	(Indonesia) Febby Angguni	20–22, 17–21	(silver) Runner-up
2005	Malaysia Satellite	(Malaysia) Lydia Cheah Li Ya	11–4, 11–2	(gold) Winner

Women's doubles
Year	Tournament	Partner	Opponent	Score	Result
2008	Malaysia International	(South Korea) Park Sun-young	(South Korea) Kim Mi-young (South Korea) Jang Ye-na	13–21, 21–15, 21–5	(gold) Winner
2007	Korea International	(South Korea) Lee Seul-gi	(South Korea) Yoo Hyun-young (South Korea) Jung Kyung-eun	18–21, 4–21	(silver) Runner-up

BWF International Challenge tournament
BWF International Series tournament
