= 2009 Swiss Open Super Series =

Tournament details
- Dates: March 10, 2009 - March 15, 2009
- Total prize money: US$200,000
- Venue: St. Jakobshalle
- Location: Basel, Switzerland

The 2009 Swiss Open Super Series was the fourth tournament of 2009 BWF Super Series badminton tournament. It was held from March 10 to March 15, 2009 in Basel, Switzerland.

== Seeds ==
Men's singles

1. (Malaysia) Lee Chong Wei
2. (China) Lin Dan
3. (China) Chen Jin
4. (Denmark) Peter Gade
5. (Indonesia) Sony Dwi Kuncoro
6. (Denmark) Joachim Persson
7. (Indonesia) Taufik Hidayat
8. (Poland) Przemysław Wacha

Women's singles

1. (Denmark) Tine Rasmussen
2. (Hong Kong) Zhou Mi
3. (China) Lu Lan
4. (France) Pi Hongyan
5. (China) Xie Xingfang
6. (China) Zhu Lin
7. (China) Wang Lin
8. (Germany) Xu Huaiwen

Men's doubles

1. (Denmark) Lars Paaske / Jonas Rasmussen
2. (Malaysia) Koo Kien Keat / Tan Boon Heong
3. (Denmark) Mathias Boe / Carsten Mogensen
4. (Malaysia) Mohd Zakry Abdul Latif / Mohd Fairuzizuan Mohd Tazari
5. (South Korea) Lee Yong-dae / Shin Baek-cheol
6. (China) Fu Haifeng / Cai Yun
7. (Poland) Michal Logosz/Robert Mateusiak
8. (England) Anthony Clark / Nathan Robertson

Women's doubles

1. (Chinese Taipei) Chien Yu Chin / Cheng Wen-Hsing
2. (Malaysia) Chin Eei Hui / Wong Pei Tty
3. (South Korea) Lee Kyung-won / Lee Hyo-jung
4. (China) Du Jing / Yu Yang
5. (South Korea) Ha Jung-eun / Kim Min-jung
6. (Denmark) Lena Frier Kristiansen / Kamilla Rytter Juhl
7. (China) Zhang Yawen / Zhao Tingting
8. (Indonesia) Shendy Puspa Irawati / Meiliana Jauhari

Mixed doubles

1. (Indonesia) Nova Widianto / Lilyana Natsir
2. (South Korea) Lee Yong-dae / Lee Hyo-jung
3. (China) He Hanbin / Yu Yang
4. (England) Anthony Clark / Donna Kellogg
5. (Denmark) Thomas Laybourn / Kamilla Rytter Juhl
6. (England) Robert Blair / (Scotland) Imogen Bankier
7. (Thailand) Sudket Prapakamol / Saralee Thungthongkam
8. (China) Xie Zhongbo / Zhang Yawen

== Men's singles ==
1st round
1	(Malaysia) Lee Chong Wei	21	21
(Japan) Kenichi Tago	18	12
(Netherlands) Eric Pang	7	17
(Thailand) Boonsak Ponsana	21	21
7	(Indonesia) Taufik Hidayat	21	21
(Finland) Ville Lang	18	10
(Japan) Sho Sasaki	16	20
Q2	(China) Gong Weijie	21	22
4	(Denmark) Peter Gade	WO
(Malaysia) Sairul Amar Ayob
(Malaysia) Lee Tsuen Seng	21	21
(Hong Kong) Chan Yan Kit	13	18
6	(Denmark) Joachim Persson	21	14	7
(Hong Kong) Ng Wei	19	21	2
(Denmark) Jan Ø. Jørgensen	20	21	21
Q4	(India) Anup Sridhar	22	14	13
(Malaysia) Wong Choong Hann	21	14	21
(Indonesia) Simon Santoso	12	21	19
(England) Andrew Smith	21	14	21
PFQ	(Czech Republic) Petr Koukal	15	21	10
(Netherlands) Dicky Palyama	21	16	21
Q3	(Lithuania) Kestutis Navickas	16	21	13
(China) Bao Chunlai	15	14
3	(China) Chen Jin	21	21
(Germany) Marc Zwiebler	15	16
(Chinese Taipei) Hsieh Yu-Hsing	21	21
(India) Chetan Anand	21	21
8	(Poland) Przemysław Wacha	9	16
Q1	(South Korea) Hong Ji-hoon	18	12
(China) Lü Yi	21	21
(India) Arvind Bhat	21	17	16
2	(China) Lin Dan	19	21	21

2nd round
1	(Malaysia) Lee Chong Wei	21	21
(Thailand) Boonsak Ponsana	8	15
7	(Indonesia) Taufik Hidayat	21	18	21
Q	(China) Gong Weijie	19	21	14
(Malaysia) Sairul Amar Ayob	21	18	21
(Malaysia) Lee Tsuen Seng	17	21	14
6	(Denmark) Joachim Persson	20	19
(Denmark) Jan Ø. Jørgensen	22	21
(Malaysia) Wong Choong Hann	21	12	16
(England) Andrew Smith	16	21	21
(Netherlands) Dicky Palyama	17	8
3	(China) Chen Jin	21	21
(Chinese Taipei) Hsieh Yu-Hsing	9	22	21
(India) Chetan Anand	21	20	17
(China) Lü Yi	15	13
2	(China) Lin Dan	21	21

Quarterfinals
1	(Malaysia) Lee Chong Wei	21	21	21
7	(Indonesia) Taufik Hidayat	23	12	19
(Malaysia) Sairul Amar Ayob	18	16
(Denmark) Jan Ø. Jørgensen	21	21
(England) Andrew Smith	10	5
3	(China) Chen Jin	21	21
(Chinese Taipei) Hsieh Yu-Hsing	16	14
2	(China) Lin Dan	21	21

Semifinals
1	(Malaysia) Lee Chong Wei	21	20	21
(Denmark) Jan Ø. Jørgensen	12	22	9
Finals
1	(Malaysia) Lee Chong Wei	21	21
2	(China) Lin Dan	16	16
3	(China) Chen Jin	13	14
2	(China) Lin Dan	21	21

== Women's singles ==
1st round
PFQ	(Thailand) Porntip Buranaprasertsuk	13	17
(Japan) Ai Goto	21	21
(Hong Kong) Yip Pui Yin	10	11
(Thailand) Salakjit Ponsana	21	21
5	(China) Xie Xingfang	21	21
WC	(Switzerland) Jeanine Cicognini	9	16
(China) Jiang Yanjiao	21	21
(Russia) Ella Diehl	6	5
4	(France) Pi Hongyan	17	21	21
(Indonesia) Adrianti Firdasari	21	19	12
(Netherlands) Yao Jie	21	21
(Scotland) Susan Hughes	13	19
8	(Germany) Xu Huaiwen	21	21
(Finland) Anu Nieminen	7	16
(Germany) Juliane Schenk	21	21
Q	(Chinese Taipei) Cheng Shao-chieh	12	18
PFQ	(South Korea) Bae Youn-joo	6	17
(India) Saina Nehwal	21	21
(Canada) Anna Rice	14	21	9
6	(China) Zhu Lin	21	18	21
(England) Elizabeth Cann	21	21
Q	(Denmark) Nanna Brosolat Jensen	18	9
(Netherlands) Judith Meulendijks	15	16
3	(China) Lu Lan	21	21
Q	(Estonia) Kati Tolmoff	15	11
(China) Wang Yihan	21	21
(South Korea) Hwang Hye-youn	12	10
7	(China) Wang Lin	21	21
(Indonesia) Pia Zebadiah	11	11
(Japan) Megumi Taruno	21	21
Q	(Slovenia) Maja Tvrdy	11	11
2	(Hong Kong) Zhou Mi	21	21

2nd round
(Japan) Ai Goto	16	15
(Thailand) Salakjit Ponsana	21	21
5	(China) Xie Xingfang	20	21	17
(China) Jiang Yanjiao	22	14	21
4	(France) Pi Hongyan	21	21
(Netherlands) Yao Jie	11	11
8	(Germany) Xu Huaiwen	21	14	16
(Germany) Juliane Schenk	15	21	21
(India) Saina Nehwal	22	11	21
6	(China) Zhu Lin	20	21	11
(England) Elizabeth Cann	8	13
3	(China) Lu Lan	21	21
(China) Wang Yihan	16	21	21
7	(China) Wang Lin	21	13	13
(Japan) Megumi Taruno	22	11
2	(Hong Kong) Zhou Mi	24	21

Quarterfinals
(Thailand) Salakjit Ponsana	16	13
(China) Jiang Yanjiao	21	21
4	(France) Pi Hongyan	21	21
(Germany) Juliane Schenk	18	13
(India) Saina Nehwal	21	8	17
3	(China) Lu Lan	18	21	21
(China) Wang Yihan	21	23
2	(Hong Kong) Zhou Mi	11	21

Semifinals
(China) Jiang Yanjiao	13	21	21
4	(France) Pi Hongyan	21	18	16
Finals
(China) Jiang Yanjiao	17	21	13
(China) Wang Yihan	21	17	21
3	(China) Lu Lan	20	21	16
(China) Wang Yihan	22	19	21

== Men's doubles ==
1st round
PFQ	(Japan) Kenichi Hayakawa (Japan) Kenta Kazuno	21	21
(Indonesia) Yonatan Suryatama Dasuki (Indonesia) Rian Sukmawan	18	18
(Germany) Kristof Hopp (Germany) Johannes Schoettler	21	12	14
(South Korea) Cho Gun-woo (South Korea) Ko Sung-hyun	12	21	21
5	(South Korea) Lee Yong-dae (South Korea) Shin Baek-cheol	21	21
PFQ	(Austria) Juergen Koch (Austria) Peter Zauner	12	9
Q	(Indonesia) Alvent Yulianto Chandra (Indonesia) Hendra Aprida Gunawan	21	21
(Germany) Peter Kaesbauer (Germany) Roman Spitko	12	14
3	(Denmark) Mathias Boe (Denmark) Carsten Mogensen	21	21
(South Korea) Han Sang-hoon (South Korea) Hwang Ji-man	17	17
(Indonesia) Mohammad Ahsan (Indonesia) Bona Septano	14	14
(China) Guo Zhendong (China) Xu Chen	21	21
8	(England) Anthony Clark (England) Nathan Robertson	21	21
(Belgium) Wouter Claes (Belgium) Frederic Mawet	11	11
(Russia) Vitalij Durkin (Russia) Alexandr Nikolaenko	9	24	19
(South Korea) Kwon Yi-goo (South Korea) Yoo Yeon-seong	21	22	21
(Netherlands) Ruud Bosch (Netherlands) Koen Ridder	21	19	19
(England) Richard Eidestedt (England) Andrew Ellis	19	21	21
(Chinese Taipei) Fang Chieh-Min (Chinese Taipei) Lee Sheng-Mu	16	21	18
6	(China) Cai Yun (China) Fu Haifeng	21	12	21
(England) Chris Adcock (England) Robert Blair	13	21	21
(Germany) Michael Fuchs (Germany) Ingo Kindervater	21	18	15
(Japan) Shintaro Ikeda (Japan) Shuichi Sakamoto	14	21	21
4	(Malaysia) Mohd Zakry Abdul Latif (Malaysia) Mohd Fairuzizuan Mohd Tazari	21	19	9
Q	(Switzerland) Christian Bösiger (Switzerland) Anthony Dumartheray	11	21	6
Q	(China) He Hanbin (China) Sun Junjie	21	17	21
(England) Chris Langridge (England) David Lindley	16	21	11
7	(Poland) Michal Logosz (Poland) Robert Mateusiak	21	19	21
(Poland) Adam Cwalina (Poland) Wojciech Szkudlarczyk	10	16
(Indonesia) Joko Riyadi (Indonesia) Candra Wijaya	21	21
(Malaysia) Gan Teik Chai (Malaysia) Tan Bin Shen	18	15
2	(Malaysia) Koo Kien Keat (Malaysia) Tan Boon Heong	21	21

2nd round
PFQ	(Japan) Kenichi Hayakawa (Japan) Kenta Kazuno	21	21
(South Korea) Cho Gun-woo (South Korea) Ko Sung-hyun	17	17
5	(South Korea) Lee Yong-dae (South Korea) Shin Baek-cheol	18	21	21
Q	(Indonesia) Alvent Yulianto Chandra (Indonesia) Hendra Aprida Gunawan	16	14
3	(Denmark) Mathias Boe (Denmark) Carsten Mogensen	16	22	21
Q	(China) Guo Zhendong (China) Xu Chen	21	20	18
8	(England) Anthony Clark (England) Nathan Robertson	21	21
(South Korea) Kwon Yi-goo (South Korea) Yoo Yeon-seong	18	14
(England) Richard Eidestedt (England) Andrew Ellis	10	13
6	(China) Cai Yun (China) Fu Haifeng	21	21
(England) Chris Adcock (England) Robert Blair	21	21
(Japan) Shintaro Ikeda (Japan) Shuichi Sakamoto	19	15
(China) He Hanbin (China) Sun Junjie	20	14
(Poland) Michal Logosz (Poland) Robert Mateusiak	22	21
(Indonesia) Joko Riyadi (Indonesia) Candra Wijaya	17	16
2	(Malaysia) Koo Kien Keat (Malaysia) Tan Boon Heong	21	21

Quarterfinals
PFQ	(Japan) Kenichi Hayakawa (Japan) Kenta Kazuno
5	(South Korea) Lee Yong-dae (South Korea) Shin Baek-cheol
3	(Denmark) Mathias Boe (Denmark) Carsten Mogensen
8	(England) Anthony Clark (England) Nathan Robertson
6	(China) Cai Yun (China) Fu Haifeng
(England) Chris Adcock (England) Robert Blair
7	(Poland) Michal Logosz (Poland) Robert Mateusiak
2	(Malaysia) Koo Kien Keat (Malaysia) Tan Boon Heong

Semifinals
5	(South Korea) Lee Yong-dae (South Korea) Shin Baek-cheol	21	19	14
3	(Denmark) Mathias Boe (Denmark) Carsten Mogensen	19	21	21
Finals
3	(Denmark) Mathias Boe (Denmark) Carsten Mogensen	14	18
2	(Malaysia) Koo Kien Keat (Malaysia) Tan Boon Heong	21	21
6	(China) Cai Yun (China) Fu Haifeng	21	21	14
2	(Malaysia) Koo Kien Keat (Malaysia) Tan Boon Heong	23	18	21

== Women's doubles ==
1st round
1	(Chinese Taipei) Cheng Wen-Hsing (Chinese Taipei) Chien Yu Chin	21	21
Q	(Switzerland) Sabrina Angehrn (Germany) Claudia Vogelgsang	8	10
(England) Jenny Wallwork (England) Gabrielle White	21	21
(Poland) Malgorzata Kurdelska (Poland) Agnieszka Wojtkowska	18	17
6	(Denmark) Lena Frier Kristiansen (Denmark) Kamilla Rytter Juhl	21	21
(Germany) Nicole Grether (Canada) Charmaine Reid	13	10
(Indonesia) Nitya Krishinda Maheswari (Indonesia) Greysia Polii	21	21
Q	(Switzerland) Monika Fischer (Switzerland) Marion Gruber	13	10
4	(China) Du Jing (China) Yu Yang	21	21
(France) Laura Choinet (France) Weny Rahmawati	5	10
(Russia) Valeri Sorokina (Russia) Nina Vislova
Q3	bye
(China) Zhang Yawen (China) Zhao Tingting	21	21
(China) Cheng Shu (China) Zhao Yunlei	15	10
(Malaysia) Haw Chiou Hwee (Malaysia) Lim Pek Siah	B	Y	E
(China) Pan Pan (China) Tian Qing
Q	(Switzerland) Sanya Herzig (Switzerland) Tenzin Pelling	6	15
(South Korea) Jang Ye-na (South Korea) Kim Mi-young	21	21
(Germany) Sandra Marinello (Germany) Birgit Overzier	16	14
8	(Indonesia) Shendy Puspa Irawati (Indonesia) Meiliana Jauhari	21	21
(France) Sashina Vignes Waran (France) Teshana Vignes Waran	12	15
(Russia) Ekaterina Ananina (Russia) Anastasia Russkikh	21	21
(Thailand) Duanganong Aroonkesorn (Thailand) Kunchala Voravichitchaikul	12	10
3	(South Korea) Lee Hyo-jung (South Korea) Lee Kyung-won	21	21
PFQ	(Slovenia) Spela Silvester (Slovenia) Maja Tvrdy	18	13
(Switzerland) Corinne Joerg (Poland) Aleksandra Walaszek	21	21
PFQ	(Chinese Taipei) Chen Hsiao-Huan (Chinese Taipei) Cheng Shao-chieh	12	9
5	(South Korea) Ha Jung-eun (South Korea) Kim Min-jung	21	21
(Switzerland) Sabrina Jaquet (Switzerland) Huwaina Razi	10	18
(India) Saina Nehwal (Canada) Anna Rice	21	21
(Czech Republic) Petra Hofmanova (Czech Republic) Sarka Krizkova	14	4
2	(Malaysia) Chin Eei Hui (Malaysia) Wong Pei Tty	21	21

2nd round
1	(Chinese Taipei) Cheng Wen-Hsing (Chinese Taipei) Chien Yu Chin	21	21
(England) Jenny Wallwork (England) Gabrielle White	16	6
6	(Denmark) Lena Frier Kristiansen (Denmark) Kamilla Rytter Juhl	21	21
(Indonesia) Nitya Krishinda Maheswari (Indonesia) Greysia Polii	14	17
4	(China) Du Jing (China) Yu Yang	21	21
(Russia) Valeri Sorokina (Russia) Nina Vislova	12	7
7	(China) Zhang Yawen (China) Zhao Tingting	21	13	21
(China) Pan Pan (China) Tian Qing	14	21	14
(South Korea) Jang Ye-na (South Korea) Kim Mi-young	21	11
8	(Indonesia) Shendy Puspa Irawati (Indonesia) Meiliana Jauhari	23	21
(Russia) Ekaterina Ananina (Russia) Anastasia Russkikh	12	12
3	(South Korea) Lee Hyo-jung (South Korea) Lee Kyung-won	21	21
(Switzerland) Corinne Joerg (Poland) Aleksandra Walaszek	4	5
5	(South Korea) Ha Jung-eun (South Korea) Kim Min-jung	21	21
(India) Saina Nehwal (Canada) Anna Rice	16	12
2	(Malaysia) Chin Eei Hui (Malaysia) Wong Pei Tty	21	21

Quarterfinals
1	(Chinese Taipei) Cheng Wen-Hsing (Chinese Taipei) Chien Yu Chin	21	21
6	(Denmark) Lena Frier Kristiansen (Denmark) Kamilla Rytter Juhl	16	16
4	(China) Du Jing (China) Yu Yang	26	21
7	(China) Zhang Yawen (China) Zhao Tingting	24	16
8	(Indonesia) Shendy Puspa Irawati (Indonesia) Meiliana Jauhari	7	14
3	(South Korea) Lee Hyo-jung (South Korea) Lee Kyung-won	21	21
5	(South Korea) Ha Jung-eun (South Korea) Kim Min-jung	Wa	l	k
2	(Malaysia) Chin Eei Hui (Malaysia) Wong Pei Tty	WO

Semifinals
1	(Chinese Taipei) Cheng Wen-Hsing (Chinese Taipei) Chien Yu Chin	19	13
4	(China) Du Jing (China) Yu Yang	21	21
Finals
4	(China) Du Jing (China) Yu Yang	21	21
3	(South Korea) Lee Hyo-jung (South Korea) Lee Kyung-won	11	12
3	(South Korea) Lee Hyo-jung (South Korea) Lee Kyung-won	21	21
5	(South Korea) Ha Jung-eun (South Korea) Kim Min-jung	5	17

== Mixed doubles ==
1st round
1	(Indonesia) Nova Widianto (Indonesia) Lilyana Natsir	21	18	21
(England) David Lindley (England) Suzanne Rayappan	12	21	13
(South Korea) Han Sang-hoon (South Korea) Kim Min-jung	12	22
(South Korea) Ko Sung-hyun (South Korea) Ha Jung-eun	21	24
5	(Denmark) Thomas Laybourn (Denmark) Kamilla Rytter Juhl	25	21
(Malaysia) Koo Kien Keat (Malaysia) Ng Hui Lin	23	15
(Belgium) Wouter Claes (Belgium) Nathalie Descamps	19	15
(China) Zheng Bo (China) Ma Jin	21	21
3	(China) He Hanbin (China) Yu Yang	21	21
Q	(Chinese Taipei) Lee Sheng-Mu (Chinese Taipei) Cheng Shao-chieh	9	13
(Indonesia) Devin Lahardi Fitriawan (Indonesia) Lita Nurlita	21	21
(Netherlands) Ruud Bosch (Netherlands) Paulien van Dooremalen	17	10
7	(Thailand) Sudket Prapakamol (Thailand) Saralee Thungthongkam	21	21
(Poland) Adam Cwalina (Poland) Malgorzata Kurdelska	11	15
Q	(Russia) Alexandr Nikolaenko (Russia) Nina Vislova	21	21
(Germany) Michael Fuchs (Germany) Annekatrin Lillie	16	13
Q	(Switzerland) Rohanda Agung (Switzerland) Cynthia Tuwankotta	21	25	21
(France) Baptiste Careme (France) Laura Choinet	19	27	18
PFQ	(Poland) Wojciech Szkudlarczyk (Poland) Agnieszka Wojtkowska	11	11
8	(China) Xie Zhongbo (China) Zhang Yawen	21	21
(China) Xu Chen (China) Zhao Yunlei	21	21
(Chinese Taipei) Fang Chieh-Min (Chinese Taipei) Cheng Wen-Hsing	19	15
(England) Chris Adcock (England) Gabrielle White	7	5
(England) Anthony Clark (England) Donna Kellogg	21	21
(Indonesia) Flandy Limpele (Russia) Anastasia Russkikh	17	13
PFQ	(Malaysia) Mohd Fairuzizuan Mohd Tazari (Malaysia) Wong Pei Tty	21	21
(Chinese Taipei) Hsieh Yu-Hsing (Chinese Taipei) Chien Yu Chin	19	22	21
6	(England) Robert Blair (Scotland) Imogen Bankier	21	20	13
(Thailand) Songphon Anugritayawon (Thailand) Kunchala Voravichitchaikul	21	14	21
Q	(Russia) Vitalij Durkin (Russia) Valeri Sorokina	17	21	13
(Germany) Johannes Schoettler (Germany) Birgit Overzier	20	8
2	(South Korea) Lee Yong-dae (South Korea) Lee Hyo-jung	22	21

2nd round
1	(Indonesia) Nova Widianto (Indonesia) Lilyana Natsir	21	12	21
(South Korea) Ko Sung-hyun (South Korea) Ha Jung-eun	17	21	12
5	(Denmark) Thomas Laybourn (Denmark) Kamilla Rytter Juhl	22	16	10
(China) Zheng Bo (China) Ma Jin	20	21	21
3	(China) He Hanbin (China) Yu Yang	21	22
(Indonesia) Devin Lahardi Fitriawan (Indonesia) Lita Nurlita	15	20
7	(Thailand) Sudket Prapakamol (Thailand) Saralee Thungthongkam	18	21	21
Q	(Russia) Alexandr Nikolaenko (Russia) Nina Vislova	21	12	6
Q	(Switzerland) Rohanda Agung (Switzerland) Cynthia Tuwankotta	7	17
8	(China) Xie Zhongbo (China) Zhang Yawen	21	21
(China) Xu Chen (China) Zhao Yunlei	21	21
(England) Anthony Clark (England) Donna Kellogg	7	13
PFQ	(Malaysia) Mohd Fairuzizuan Mohd Tazari (Malaysia) Wong Pei Tty	21	12	21
(Chinese Taipei) Hsieh Yu-Hsing (Chinese Taipei) Chien Yu Chin	19	21	15
(Thailand) Songphon Anugritayawon (Thailand) Kunchala Voravichitchaikul	14	12
2	(South Korea) Lee Yong-dae (South Korea) Lee Hyo-jung	21	21

Quarterfinals
1	(Indonesia) Nova Widianto (Indonesia) Lilyana Natsir	13	12
(China) Zheng Bo (China) Ma Jin	21	21
3	(China) He Hanbin (China) Yu Yang	11	19
7	(Thailand) Sudket Prapakamol (Thailand) Saralee Thungthongkam	21	21
(China) Xie Zhongbo (China) Zhang Yawen	16	21	13
(China) Xu Chen (China) Zhao Yunlei	21	11	21
PFQ	(Malaysia) Mohd Fairuzizuan Mohd Tazari (Malaysia) Wong Pei Tty	18	8
2	(South Korea) Lee Yong-dae (South Korea) Lee Hyo-jung	21	21

Semifinals
(China) Zheng Bo (China) Ma Jin	21	21
7	(Thailand) Sudket Prapakamol (Thailand) Saralee Thungthongkam	14	19
Finals
(China) Zheng Bo (China) Ma Jin	21	21
2	(South Korea) Lee Yong-dae (South Korea) Lee Hyo-jung	16	15
(China) Xu Chen (China) Zhao Yunlei	18	17
2	(South Korea) Lee Yong-dae (South Korea) Lee Hyo-jung	21	21
