= 2009 French Super Series =

Badminton competition in Paris, France

The 2009 French Open Super Series was a top level badminton competition which was held from 27 October 2009 to 1 November 2009 in Paris, France. It was the tenth BWF Super Series competition on the 2009 BWF Super Series schedule. The total purse for the event was $200,000.

== Men's singles ==
=== Seeds ===
1. (China) Lin Dan
2. (Denmark) Peter Gade
3. (China) Chen Jin
4. (Indonesia) Taufik Hidayat
5. (Indonesia) Sony Dwi Kuncoro
6. (Denmark) Joachim Persson
7. (Malaysia) Wong Choong Hann
8. (Hong Kong) Chan Yan Kit

=== Results ===
Quarterfinals
1	(China) Lin Dan	21	21
6	(Denmark) Joachim Persson	19	16
3	(China) Chen Jin	19	21	21
(Hong Kong) Hu Yun	21	14	15
(China) Chen Long	20	15
4	(Indonesia) Taufik Hidayat	22	21
(China) Bao Chunlai	15	21	13
2	(Denmark) Peter Gade	21	14	21

Semifinals
1	(China) Lin Dan	21	23
3	(China) Chen Jin	19	21
4	(Indonesia) Taufik Hidayat	22	21
8	(Denmark) Peter Gade	20	14

Finals
1	(China) Lin Dan	21	21
4	(Indonesia) Taufik Hidayat	6	15

== Women's singles ==
=== Seeds ===
1. (China) Wang Lin
2. (Hong Kong) Zhou Mi
3. (China) Wang Yihan
4. (Denmark) Tine Rasmussen
5. (France) Pi Hongyan
6. (China) Jiang Yanjiao
7. (China) Lu Lan
8. (India) Saina Nehwal

=== Results ===
Quarterfinals
1	(China) Wang Lin	15	21	21
8	(India) Saina Nehwal	21	11	15
(Indonesia) Adriyanti Firdasari	21	19	15
(Netherlands) Yao Jie	18	21	21
7	(China) Lu Lan	17	21
3	(China) Wang Yihan	21	23
5	(France) Pi Hongyan	25	21
Q1	(Poland) Olga Konon	23	9

Semifinals
1	(China) Wang Lin	22	21
(Netherlands) Yao Jie	20	8
3	(China) Wang Yihan	21	21
5	(France) Pi Hongyan	13	11

Finals
1	(China) Wang Lin	9	12
3	(China) Wang Yihan	21	21

== Men's doubles ==
=== Seeds ===
1. (Indonesia) Markis Kido / Hendra Setiawan
2. (Malaysia) Koo Kien Keat / Tan Boon Heong
3. (Denmark) Mathias Boe / Carsten Mogensen
4. (China) Cai Yun / Fu Haifeng
5. (Malaysia) Mohd Zakry Abdul Latif / Mohd Fairuzizuan Mohd Tazari
6. (Denmark) Lars Paaske / Jonas Rasmussen
7. (England) Anthony Clark / Nathan Robertson
8. (China) Guo Zhendong / Xu Chen

=== Results ===
Quarterfinals
1	(Indonesia) Markis Kido (Indonesia) Hendra Setiawan	21	21
5	(Malaysia) Mohd Zakry Abdul Latif (Malaysia) Mohd Fairuzizuan Mohd Tazari	11	17
(China) Sun Junjie (China) Tao Jiaming	21	21
8	(China) Guo Zhendong (China) Xu Chen	15	18
(Indonesia) Mohammad Ahsan (Indonesia) Bona Septano	18	21	15
3	(Denmark) Mathias Boe (Denmark) Carsten Mogensen	21	12	21
7	(England) Anthony Clark (England) Nathan Robertson	12	19
2	(Malaysia) Koo Kien Keat (Malaysia) Tan Boon Heong	21	21

Semifinals
1	(Indonesia) Markis Kido (Indonesia) Hendra Setiawan	21	21
(China) Sun Junjie (China) Tao Jiaming	19	17
3	(Denmark) Mathias Boe (Denmark) Carsten Mogensen	18	19
2	(Malaysia) Koo Kien Keat (Malaysia) Tan Boon Heong	21	21

Finals
1	(Indonesia) Markis Kido (Indonesia) Hendra Setiawan	15	21	21
2	(Malaysia) Koo Kien Keat (Malaysia) Tan Boon Heong	21	15	14

== Women's doubles ==
=== Seeds ===
1. (Malaysia) Chin Eei Hui / Wong Pei Tty
2. (China) Cheng Shu / Zhao Yunlei
3. (China) Du Jing / Yu Yang
4. (Denmark) Lena Frier Kristiansen / Kamilla Rytter Juhl
5. (China) Ma Jin / Wang Xiaoli
6. (Indonesia) Shendy Puspa Irawati / Meiliana Jauhari
7. (China) Pan Pan / Zhang Yawen
8. (Indonesia) Nitya Krishinda Maheswari / Greysia Polii

=== Results ===
Quarterfinals
1	(Malaysia) Chin Eei Hui (Malaysia) Wong Pei Tty	21	19	17
5	(China) Ma Jin (China) Wang Xiaoli	19	21	21
4	(Denmark) Lena Frier Kristiansen (Denmark) Kamilla Rytter Juhl	19	21	20
8	(Indonesia) Nitya Krishinda Maheswari (Indonesia) Greysia Polii	21	18	22
7	(China) Zhang Yawen (China) Pan Pan	21	19	11
3	(China) Du Jing (China) Yu Yang	14	21	21
(England) Jenny Wallwork (England) Gabrielle White	17	17
2	(China) Cheng Shu (China) Zhao Yunlei	21	21

Semifinals
5	(China) Ma Jin (China) Wang Xiaoli	21	21
8	(Indonesia) Nitya Krishinda Maheswari (Indonesia) Greysia Polii	4	18
3	(China) Du Jing (China) Yu Yang
2	(China) Cheng Shu (China) Zhao Yunlei	w/o

Finals
5	(China) Ma Jin (China) Wang Xiaoli	21	21
2	(China) Cheng Shu (China) Zhao Yunlei	13	8

== Mixed doubles ==
=== Seeds ===
1. (China) Zheng Bo / Ma Jin
2. (Indonesia) Nova Widianto / Liliyana Natsir
3. (Denmark) Thomas Laybourn / Kamilla Rytter Juhl
4. (Denmark) Joachim Fischer Nielsen / Christinna Pedersen
5. (China) He Hanbin / Yu Yang
6. (India) Diju Valiyaveetil / Jwala Gutta
7. (Indonesia) Hendra Aprida Gunawan / Vita Marissa
8. (China) Tao Jiaming / Zhang Yawen

=== Results ===
Quarterfinals
(Germany) Kristof Hopp (Russia) Anastasia Russkikh	18	9
7	(Indonesia) Hendra Aprida Gunawan (Indonesia) Vita Marissa	21	21
PFQ	(Malaysia) Koo Kien Keat (Malaysia) Wong Pei Tty	12	17
8	(China) Tao Jiaming (China) Zhang Yawen	21	21
5	(China) He Hanbin (China) Yu Yang	21	22
4	(Denmark) Joachim Fischer Nielsen (Denmark) Christinna Pedersen	17	20
6	(India) Diju Valiyaveetil (India) Jwala Gutta	21	20	10
2	(Indonesia) Nova Widianto (Indonesia) Liliyana Natsir	6	22	21

Semifinals
7	(Indonesia) Hendra Aprida Gunawan (Indonesia) Vita Marissa	22	21
8	(China) Tao Jiaming (China) Zhang Yawen	20	17
5	(China) He Hanbin (China) Yu Yang	27	14	17
2	(Indonesia) Nova Widianto (Indonesia) Liliyana Natsir	25	21	21

Finals
7	(Indonesia) Hendra Aprida Gunawan (Indonesia) Vita Marissa	7	7
2	(Indonesia) Nova Widianto (Indonesia) Liliyana Natsir	21	21

Preceded by 2008 French Super Series	French Super Series	Succeeded by 2010 French Super Series
Preceded by 2009 Denmark Super Series	2009 BWF Super Series	Succeeded by 2009 Hong Kong Super Series
