= 2009 BWF Super Series =

Tournament details
- Dates: 6 January – 6 December 2009
- Edition: 3rd

The 2009 BWF Super Series was the third season of the BWF Super Series. Like the previous season, the twelve tournaments were all hosted by nations in Asia and Europe with the Malaysia Open as the opening tournament and China Open as the final tournament in the season.

== Schedule ==
Below is the schedule released by the Badminton World Federation:

| Tour | Official title | Venue | City | Date | | Prize money USD | Report |
| Tour | Official title | Venue | City | Start | Finish | Prize money USD | Report |
|---|---|---|---|---|---|---|---|
| 1 | Malaysia Super Series | Putra Indoor Stadium | Kuala Lumpur | January 6 | January 11 | 200,000 | Report |
| 2 | (South Korea) Korea Open Super Series | SK Olympic Handball Gymnasium | Seoul | January 13 | January 18 | 300,000 | Report |
| 3 | All England Super Series | National Indoor Arena | Birmingham | March 3 | March 8 | 200,000 | Report |
| 4 | (Switzerland) Swiss Open Super Series | St. Jakobshalle | Basel | March 10 | March 15 | 200,000 | Report |
| 5 | Singapore Super Series | Singapore Indoor Stadium | Singapore | June 9 | June 14 | 200,000 | Report |
| 6 | Indonesia Super Series | Istora Senayan | Jakarta | June 16 | June 21 | 250,000 | Report |
| 7 | China Masters Super Series | Olympic Sports Center Gymnasium | Changzhou | September 15 | September 20 | 250,000 | Report |
| 8 | Japan Super Series | Tokyo Metropolitan Gymnasium | Tokyo | September 22 | September 27 | 200,000 | Report |
| 9 | Denmark Super Series | Arena Fyn | Odense | October 20 | October 25 | 200,000 | Report |
| 10 | (France) French Super Series | Stade Pierre de Coubertin | Paris | October 27 | November 1 | 200,000 | Report |
| 11 | Hong Kong Super Series | Queen Elizabeth Stadium | Hong Kong | November 10 | November 15 | 200,000 | Report |
| 12 | China Open Super Series | Yuanshen Gymnasium | Shanghai | November 17 | November 22 | 250,000 | Report |
| 13 | (Malaysia) Superseries Finals | Johor Bahru City Stadium | Johor Bahru | December 2 | December 6 | 500,000 | Report |

== Results ==
=== Winners ===
| Tour | Men's singles | Women's singles | Men's doubles | Women's doubles | Mixed doubles |
|---|---|---|---|---|---|
| Malaysia | (Malaysia) Lee Chong Wei | (Denmark) Tine Rasmussen | (South Korea) Jung Jae-sung (South Korea) Lee Yong-dae | (South Korea) Lee Hyo-jung (South Korea) Lee Kyung-won | (Indonesia) Nova Widianto (Indonesia) Liliyana Natsir |
| (South Korea) Korea | (Denmark) Peter Gade | (Denmark) Tine Rasmussen | (Denmark) Mathias Boe (Denmark) Carsten Mogensen | (Chinese Taipei) Cheng Wen-hsing (Chinese Taipei) Chien Yu-chin | (South Korea) Lee Yong-dae (South Korea) Lee Hyo-jung |
| England | (China) Lin Dan | (China) Wang Yihan | (China) Cai Yun (China) Fu Haifeng | (China) Zhang Yawen (China) Zhao Tingting | (China) He Hanbin (China) Yu Yang |
| (Switzerland) Swiss | (Malaysia) Lee Chong Wei | (China) Wang Yihan | (Malaysia) Koo Kien Keat (Malaysia) Tan Boon Heong | (China) Du Jing (China) Yu Yang | (China) Zheng Bo (China) Ma Jin |
| Singapore | (China) Bao Chunlai | (Hong Kong) Zhou Mi | (England) Anthony Clark (England) Nathan Robertson | (China) Zhang Yawen (China) Zhao Tingting | (China) Zheng Bo (China) Ma Jin |
| Indonesia | (Malaysia) Lee Chong Wei | (India) Saina Nehwal | (South Korea) Jung Jae-sung (South Korea) Lee Yong-dae | (Malaysia) Chin Eei Hui (Malaysia) Wong Pei Tty | (China) Zheng Bo (China) Ma Jin |
| China Masters | (China) Lin Dan | (China) Wang Shixian | (China) Guo Zhendong (China) Xu Chen | (China) Du Jing (China) Yu Yang | (China) Tao Jiaming (China) Wang Xiaoli |
| Japan | (China) Bao Chunlai | (China) Wang Yihan | (Indonesia) Markis Kido (Indonesia) Hendra Setiawan | (China) Ma Jin (China) Wang Xiaoli | (Thailand) Songphon Anugritayawon (Thailand) Kunchala Voravichitchaikul |
| Denmark | (Indonesia) Simon Santoso | (Denmark) Tine Rasmussen | (Malaysia) Koo Kien Keat (Malaysia) Tan Boon Heong | (China) Pan Pan (China) Zhang Yawen | (Denmark) Joachim Fischer Nielsen (Denmark) Christinna Pedersen |
| (France) French | (China) Lin Dan | (China) Wang Yihan | (Indonesia) Markis Kido (Indonesia) Hendra Setiawan | (China) Ma Jin (China) Wang Xiaoli | (Indonesia) Nova Widianto (Indonesia) Liliyana Natsir |
| Hong Kong | (Malaysia) Lee Chong Wei | (China) Wang Yihan | (South Korea) Jung Jae-sung (South Korea) Lee Yong-dae | (China) Ma Jin (China) Wang Xiaoli | (Poland) Robert Mateusiak (Poland) Nadieżda Kostiuczyk |
| China Open | (China) Lin Dan | (China) Jiang Yanjiao | (South Korea) Jung Jae-sung (South Korea) Lee Yong-dae | (China) Tian Qing (China) Zhang Yawen | (South Korea) Lee Yong-dae (South Korea) Lee Hyo-jung |
| (Malaysia) Masters Finals | (Malaysia) Lee Chong Wei | (Malaysia) Wong Mew Choo | (South Korea) Jung Jae-sung (South Korea) Lee Yong-dae | (Malaysia) Wong Pei Tty (Malaysia) Chin Eei Hui | (Denmark) Joachim Fischer Nielsen (Denmark) Christinna Pedersen |

=== Performance by countries ===
Tabulated below are the Super Series performances based on countries. Only countries who have won a title are listed:

| Team | MAS | KOR | ENG | SUI | SIN | INA | CHN | JPN | DEN | FRA | HKG | CHN | Final | Total |
|---|---|---|---|---|---|---|---|---|---|---|---|---|---|---|
| China | | | 5 | 3 | 3 | 1 | 5 | 3 | 1 | 3 | 2 | 3 | | 29 |
| Malaysia | 1 | | | 2 | | 2 | | | 1 | | 1 | | 3 | 10 |
| Korea | 2 | 1 | | | | 1 | | | | | 1 | 2 | 1 | 8 |
| Denmark | 1 | 3 | | | | | | | 2 | | | | 1 | 7 |
| Indonesia | 1 | | | | | | | 1 | 1 | 2 | | | | 5 |
| Chinese Taipei | | 1 | | | | | | | | | | | | 1 |
| Hong Kong | | | | | 1 | | | | | | | | | 1 |
| England | | | | | 1 | | | | | | | | | 1 |
| India | | | | | | 1 | | | | | | | | 1 |
| Poland | | | | | | | | | | | 1 | | | 1 |
| Thailand | | | | | | | | 1 | | | | | | 1 |
