= 2009 Japan Super Series =

The 2009 Japan Open Super Series was a top level badminton competition which was held from September 22, 2009 to September 27, 2009 in Tokyo, Japan. It was the eighth BWF Super Series competition on the 2009 BWF Super Series schedule. The total purse for the event was $200,000.

== Men's singles ==
=== Seeds ===
1. (Malaysia) Lee Chong Wei
2. (China) Chen Jin
3. (Denmark) Peter Gade
4. (Indonesia) Taufik Hidayat
5. (Indonesia) Sony Dwi Kuncoro
6. (South Korea) Park Sung Hwan
7. (Denmark) Joachim Persson
8. (Vietnam) Nguyen Tien Minh

=== Results ===
Quarterfinals
(Indonesia) Simon Santoso	21	21
5	(Indonesia) Sony Dwi Kuncoro	16	17
4	(Indonesia) Taufik Hidayat	12	28	21
6	(South Korea) Park Sung Hwan	21	26	15
(China) Bao Chunlai	21	21
3	(Denmark) Peter Gade	17	14
8	(Vietnam) Nguyen Tien Minh	21	21
PFQ	(Japan) Kazuteru Kozai	14	16

Semifinals
(Indonesia) Simon Santoso	21	12	18
4	(Indonesia) Taufik Hidayat	13	21	21
(China) Bao Chunlai	21	21
8	(Vietnam) Nguyen Tien Minh	15	16

Finals
4	(Indonesia) Taufik Hidayat	15	12
(China) Bao Chunlai	21	21

== Women's singles ==
=== Seeds ===
1. (Hong Kong) Zhou Mi
2. (China) Wang Lin
3. (Denmark) Tine Rasmussen
4. (China) Wang Yihan
5. (China) Lu Lan
6. (China) Xie Xingfang
7. (France) Pi Hongyan
8. (India) Saina Nehwal

=== Results ===
Quarterfinals
(Germany) Nicole Grether	7	18
PFQ	(Japan) Eriko Hirose	21	21
4	(China) Wang Yihan	21	21
(Thailand) Salakjit Ponsana	11	15
PFQ	(Japan) Mayu Sekiya	14	21	19
Q4	(China) Wang Xin	21	19	21
7	(France) Pi Hongyan	9	12
2	(China) Wang Lin	21	21

Semifinals
PFQ	(Japan) Eriko Hirose	21	12	9
4	(China) Wang Yihan	18	21	21
Q4	(China) Wang Xin	21	21
2	(China) Wang Lin	15	17

Finals
4	(China) Wang Yihan	21	21
Q4	(China) Wang Xin	8	9

== Men's doubles ==
=== Seeds ===
1. (Indonesia) Markis Kido / Hendra Setiawan
2. (Malaysia) Koo Kien Keat / Tan Boon Heong
3. (South Korea) Jung Jae-sung / Lee Yong-dae
4. (Denmark) Mathias Boe / Carsten Mogensen
5. (China) Cai Yun / Fu Haifeng
6. (Denmark) Lars Paaske / Jonas Rasmussen
7. (Malaysia) Mohd Zakry Abdul Latif / Mohd Fairuzizuan Mohd Tazari
8. (Indonesia) Alvent Yulianto Chandra / Hendra Aprida Gunawan

=== Results ===
Quarterfinals
1	(Indonesia) Markis Kido (Indonesia) Hendra Setiawan	21	21
(South Korea) Hwang Ji-Man (South Korea) Shin Baek-cheol	13	19
4	(Denmark) Mathias Boe (Denmark) Carsten Mogensen	19	21	16
8	(Indonesia) Alvent Yulianto Chandra (Indonesia) Hendra Aprida Gunawan	21	12	21
7	(Malaysia) Mohd Zakry Abdul Latif (Malaysia) Mohd Fairuzizuan Mohd Tazari	23	21	10
(Indonesia) Yonathan Suryatama Dasuki (Indonesia) Rian Sukmawan	25	16	21
(United States) Howard Bach (United States) Tony Gunawan	22	18	21
(Japan) Hirokatsu Hashimoto (Japan) Noriyasu Hirata	20	21	9

Semifinals
1	(Indonesia) Markis Kido (Indonesia) Hendra Setiawan	21	21
8	(Indonesia) Alvent Yulianto Chandra (Indonesia) Hendra Aprida Gunawan	17	15
(Indonesia) Yonathan Suryatama Dasuki (Indonesia) Rian Sukmawan	15	21	21
(United States) Howard Bach (United States) Tony Gunawan	21	17	17

Finals
1	(Indonesia) Markis Kido (Indonesia) Hendra Setiawan	21	24
(Indonesia) Yonathan Suryatama Dasuki (Indonesia) Rian Sukmawan	19	22

== Women's doubles ==
=== Seeds ===
1. (Malaysia) Chin Eei Hui / Wong Pei Tty
2. (South Korea) Ha Jung-Eun / Kim Min-Jung
3. (China) Du Jing / Yu Yang
4. (Indonesia) Shendy Puspa Irawati / Meiliana Jauhari
5. (China) Ma Jin / Wang Xiaoli
6. (Indonesia) Nitya Krishinda Maheswari / Greysia Polii
7. (Japan) Miyuki Maeda / Satoko Suetsuna
8. (Chinese Taipei) Chen Hsiao-Huan / Cheng Wen-Hsing

=== Results ===
Quarterfinals
1	(Malaysia) Chin Eei Hui (Malaysia) Wong Pei Tty	19	12
5	(China) Ma Jin (China) Wang Xiaoli	21	21
(Japan) Kanako Konishi (Japan) Sayaka Takahashi	10	17
6	(Indonesia) Nitya Krishinda Maheswari (Indonesia) Greysia Polii	21	21
7	(Japan) Miyuki Maeda (Japan) Satoko Suetsuna	21	21
4	(Indonesia) Shendy Puspa Irawati (Indonesia) Meiliana Jauhari	19	10
8	(Chinese Taipei) Chen Hsiao-Huan (Chinese Taipei) Cheng Wen-Hsing	15	18
2	(South Korea) Ha Jung-Eun (South Korea) Kim Min-Jung	21	21

Semifinals
5	(China) Ma Jin (China) Wang Xiaoli	18	21	17
6	(Indonesia) Nitya Krishinda Maheswari (Indonesia) Greysia Polii	21	14	10r
7	(Japan) Miyuki Maeda (Japan) Satoko Suetsuna	19	21	21
2	(South Korea) Ha Jung-Eun (South Korea) Kim Min-Jung	21	18	14

Finals
5	(China) Ma Jin (China) Wang Xiaoli	21	21
7	(Japan) Miyuki Maeda (Japan) Satoko Suetsuna	19	18

== Mixed doubles ==
=== Seeds ===
1. (South Korea) Lee Yong-Dae / Lee Hyo-jung
2. (China) Zheng Bo / Ma Jin
3. (Indonesia) Nova Widianto / Liliyana Natsir
4. (China) He Hanbin / Yu Yang
5. (Denmark) Thomas Laybourn / Kamilla Rytter Juhl
6. (Denmark) Joachim Fischer Nielsen / Christinna Pedersen
7. (India) Diju Valiyaveetil / Jwala Gutta
8. (China) Xie Zhongbo / Zhang Yawen

=== Results ===
Quarterfinals
(Indonesia) Devin Lahardi Fitriawan (Indonesia) Lita Nurlita	21	9	9
6	(Denmark) Joachim Fischer Nielsen (Denmark) Christinna Pedersen	19	21	21
3	(Indonesia) Nova Widianto (Indonesia) Liliyana Natsir	17	21	21
(South Korea) Ko Sung-Hyun (South Korea) Ha Jung-Eun	21	7	14
(Thailand) Songphon Anugritayawon (Thailand) Kunchala Voravichitchaikul	21	21
(Japan) Kenta Kazuno (Japan) Reika Kakiiwa	9	9
8	(Denmark) Thomas Laybourn (Denmark) Kamilla Rytter Juhl	18	17
(Indonesia) Hendra Aprida Gunawan (Indonesia) Vita Marissa	21	21

Semifinals
6	(Denmark) Joachim Fischer Nielsen (Denmark) Christinna Pedersen	21	21
3	(Indonesia) Nova Widianto (Indonesia) Liliyana Natsir	18	12
(Thailand) Songphon Anugritayawon (Thailand) Kunchala Voravichitchaikul	21	21
(Indonesia) Hendra Aprida Gunawan (Indonesia) Vita Marissa	18	16

Finals
6	(Denmark) Joachim Fischer Nielsen (Denmark) Christinna Pedersen	21	16	20
(Thailand) Songphon Anugritayawon (Thailand) Kunchala Voravichitchaikul	13	21	22

Preceded by 2008 Japan Super Series	Japan Super Series	Succeeded by 2010 Japan Super Series
Preceded by 2009 China Masters Super Series	2009 BWF Super Series	Succeeded by 2009 Denmark Super Series
