= 2009 Hong Kong Super Series =

Badminton championships

The 2009 Hong Kong Super Series was a top level badminton competition which was held from November 10, 2009 to November 14, 2009 in Hong Kong. It was the 11th BWF Superseries competition on the 2009 BWF Super Series schedule. The total purse for the event was $250,000.

== Men's singles ==
=== Seeds ===
1. (Malaysia) Lee Chong Wei
2. (China) Lin Dan
3. (Denmark) Peter Gade
4. (China) Chen Jin
5. (Indonesia) Taufik Hidayat
6. (South Korea) Park Sung-Hwan
7. (Vietnam) Nguyễn Tiến Minh
8. (Thailand) Boonsak Ponsana

=== Results ===
Quarterfinals
1	(Malaysia) Lee Chong Wei	10	21	24
(Malaysia) Muhammad Hafiz Hashim	21	15	22
(China) Bao Chunlai	21	21
Q4	(Indonesia) Dionysius Hayom Rumbaka	15	15
(Indonesia) Simon Santoso	12	8
3	(Denmark) Peter Gade	21	21
(Hong Kong) Chan Yan Kit	21	9	12
(Japan) Kenichi Tago	19	21	21

Semifinals
1	(Malaysia) Lee Chong Wei	21	21
(China) Bao Chunlai	17	12
3	(Denmark) Peter Gade	21	21
(Japan) Kenichi Tago	12	13

Finals
1	(Malaysia) Lee Chong Wei	21	13	21
3	(Denmark) Peter Gade	13	21	16

== Women's singles ==
=== Seeds ===
1. (China) Wang Lin
2. (Hong Kong) Zhou Mi
3. (China) Wang Yihan
4. (Denmark) Tine Rasmussen
5. (France) Pi Hongyan
6. (China) Jiang Yanjiao
7. (China) Lu Lan
8. (India) Saina Nehwal

=== Results ===
Quarterfinals
1	(China) Wang Lin	21	21
(South Korea) Bae Seung-hee	18	5
(China) Wang Shixian	18	13
6	(China) Jiang Yanjiao	21	21
7	(China) Lu Lan	17	15
3	(China) Wang Yihan	21	21
5	(France) Pi Hongyan	13	18
(China) Wang Xin	21	21

Semifinals
1	(China) Wang Lin	18	14
6	(China) Jiang Yanjiao	21	21
3	(China) Wang Yihan	21	13	21
(China) Wang Xin	8	21	17

Finals
1	(China) Jiang Yanjiao	13	15
3	(China) Wang Yihan	21	21

== Men's doubles ==
=== Seeds ===
1. (Indonesia) Markis Kido / Hendra Setiawan
2. (Malaysia) Koo Kien Keat / Tan Boon Heong
3. (South Korea) Jung Jae-sung / Lee Yong-dae
4. (China) Cai Yun / Fu Haifeng
5. (Malaysia) Mohd Zakry Abdul Latif / Mohd Fairuzizuan Mohd Tazari
6. (Indonesia) Alvent Yulianto / Hendra Aprida Gunawan
7. (Denmark) Lars Paaske / Jonas Rasmussen
8. (Malaysia) Choong Tan Fook / Lee Wan Wah

=== Results ===
Quarterfinals
1	(Indonesia) Markis Kido (Indonesia) Hendra Setiawan	11	18
6	(Indonesia) Alvent Yulianto (Indonesia) Hendra Aprida Gunawan	21	21
3	(South Korea) Jung Jae-sung (South Korea) Lee Yong-dae	17	21	21
(England) Anthony Clark (England) Nathan Robertson	21	16	16
7	(Denmark) Lars Paaske (Denmark) Jonas Rasmussen	21	21
3	(Singapore) Hendra Wijaya (Singapore) Hendri Saputra	16	17
8	(Malaysia) Choong Tan Fook (Malaysia) Lee Wan Wah	21	21
2	(Malaysia) Koo Kien Keat (Malaysia) Tan Boon Heong	12	17

Semifinals
6	(Indonesia) Alvent Yulianto (Indonesia) Hendra Aprida Gunawan	15	14
3	(South Korea) Jung Jae-sung (South Korea) Lee Yong-dae	21	21
7	(Denmark) Lars Paaske (Denmark) Jonas Rasmussen	13	21	21
8	(Malaysia) Choong Tan Fook (Malaysia) Lee Wan Wah	21	11	17

Finals
3	(South Korea) Jung Jae-sung (South Korea) Lee Yong-dae	13	21	21
7	(Denmark) Lars Paaske (Denmark) Jonas Rasmussen	21	15	8

== Women's doubles ==
=== Seeds ===
1. (Malaysia) Chin Eei Hui / Wong Pei Tty
2. (China) Cheng Shu / Zhao Yunlei
3. (China) Du Jing / Yu Yang
4. (China) Ma Jin / Wang Xiaoli
5. (South Korea) Ha Jung-eun / Lee Kyung-won
6. (China) Tian Qing / Zhang Yawen
7. (Chinese Taipei) Chien Yu-Chin / Wang Pei-Rong
8. (South Korea) Kim Min-jung / Park Sun-young

=== Results ===
Quarterfinals
1	(Malaysia) Chin Eei Hui (Malaysia) Wong Pei Tty	21	21
7	(Chinese Taipei) Chien Yu-chin (Chinese Taipei) Wang Pei-rong	17	15
3	(China) Du Jing (China) Yu Yang	21	21
6	(China) Tian Qing (China) Zhang Yawen	17	10
5	(South Korea) Ha Jung-eun (South Korea) Lee Kyung-won	13	16
4	(China) Ma Jin (China) Wang Xiaoli	21	21
8	(South Korea) Kim Min-jung (South Korea) Park Sun-young	11	21
2	(China) Cheng Shu (China) Zhao Yunlei	21	23

Semifinals
1	(Malaysia) Chin Eei Hui (Malaysia) Wong Pei Tty	21	18	16
3	(China) Du Jing (China) Yu Yang	12	21	21
4	(China) Ma Jin (China) Wang Xiaoli	21	21
2	(China) Cheng Shu (China) Zhao Yunlei	19	14

Finals
3	(China) Du Jing (China) Yu Yang	21	19	12
2	(China) Ma Jin (China) Wang Xiaoli	16	21	21

== Mixed doubles ==
=== Seeds ===
1. (South Korea) Lee Yong-dae / Lee Hyo-jung
2. (China) Zheng Bo / Ma Jin
3. (Indonesia) Nova Widianto / Liliyana Natsir
4. (Denmark) Thomas Laybourn / Kamilla Rytter Juhl
5. (China) He Hanbin / Yu Yang
6. (Denmark) Joachim Fischer Nielsen / Christinna Pedersen
7. (Indonesia) Hendra Aprida Gunawan / Vita Marissa
8. (India) Valiyaveetil Diju / Jwala Gutta

=== Results ===
Quarterfinals
(Indonesia) Fran Kurniawan (Indonesia) Pia Zebadiah Bernadet	20	21	11
7	(Indonesia) Hendra Aprida Gunawan (Indonesia) Vita Marissa	22	18	21
3	(Indonesia) Nova Widianto (Indonesia) Liliyana Natsir	19	21	21
5	(China) He Hanbin (China) Yu Yang	21	9	9
(England) Anthony Clark (England) Donna Kellogg	13	16
(Poland) Robert Mateusiak (Poland) Nadieżda Kostiuczyk	21	21
(Chinese Taipei) Fang Chieh-Min (Chinese Taipei) Wang Pei-Rong	21	21
Q3	(China) Qiu Zihan (China) Tian Qing	18	19

Semifinals
7	(Indonesia) Hendra Aprida Gunawan (Indonesia) Vita Marissa	14	13
3	(Indonesia) Nova Widianto (Indonesia) Liliyana Natsir	21	21
(Poland) Robert Mateusiak (Poland) Nadieżda Kostiuczyk	16	21	24
(Chinese Taipei) Fang Chieh-min (Chinese Taipei) Wang Pei-rong	21	16	22

Finals
3	(Indonesia) Nova Widianto (Indonesia) Liliyana Natsir	20	16
(Poland) Robert Mateusiak (Poland) Nadieżda Kostiuczyk	22	21

Preceded by 2008 Hong Kong Super Series	Hong Kong Super Series	Succeeded by 2010 Hong Kong Super Series
Preceded by 2009 French Super Series	2009 BWF Super Series	Succeeded by 2009 China Super Series
