= 2009 China Open =

2009 China Open can refer to:

- 2009 China Open (tennis), a tennis tournament
- 2009 China Open Super Series, a badminton tournament
- China Open 2009 (snooker), a snooker tournament
