= 2009 China Open Super Series =

The 2009 China Open Super Series was a top level badminton competition which was held from November 17, 2009 to November 22, 2009 in Shanghai, China. It was the twelfth BWF Super Series competition on the 2009 BWF Super Series schedule. The total purse for the event was $250,000.

== Men's singles ==
=== Seeds ===
1. (Malaysia) Lee Chong Wei
2. (China) Lin Dan
3. (Indonesia) Taufik Hidayat
4. (China) Chen Jin
5. (Denmark) Peter Gade
6. (South Korea) Park Sung Hwan
7. (Indonesia) Simon Santoso
8. (Indonesia) Sony Dwi Kuncoro

=== Results ===
Quarterfinals
(Denmark) Jan Ø. Jørgensen	21	21
(Thailand) Boonsak Ponsana	11	19
4	(China) Chen Jin	21	15	21
8	(Indonesia) Sony Dwi Kuncoro	16	21	12
6	(South Korea) Park Sung Hwan	23	18	21
4	(China) Du Pengyu	21	21	14
7	(Indonesia) Simon Santoso	12	12
2	(China) Lin Dan	21	21

Semifinals
(Denmark) Jan Ø. Jørgensen	11	21	22
4	(China) Chen Jin	21	18	20
6	(South Korea) Park Sung Hwan	10	11
2	(China) Lin Dan	21	21

Finals
(Denmark) Jan Ø. Jørgensen	12	12
2	(China) Lin Dan	21	21

== Women's singles ==
=== Seeds ===
1. (China) Wang Yihan
2. (Denmark) Tine Rasmussen
3. (China) Wang Lin
4. (Hong Kong) Zhou Mi
5. (France) Pi Hongyan
6. (China) Jiang Yanjiao
7. (India) Saina Nehwal
8. (Hong Kong) Wang CHen

=== Results ===
Quarterfinals
(Malaysia) Wong Mew Choo	10	22
(China) Wang Shixian	21	24
Q4	(China) Shi Xiaoqian	11	13
6	(China) Jiang Yanjiao	21	21
Q2	(China) Li Xuerui	21	21
(China) Lu Lan	17	19
Q3	(China) Xia Jingyun	12	18
(China) Wang Xin	21	21

Semifinals
(China) Wang Shixian	14	17
6	(China) Jiang Yanjiao	21	21
Q2	(China) Li Xuerui	19	19
(China) Wang Xin	21	21

Finals
6	(China) Jiang Yanjiao	21	22
(China) Wang Xin	19	20

== Men's doubles ==
=== Seeds ===
1. (Malaysia) Koo Kien Keat / Tan Boon Heong
2. (South Korea) Jung Jae-Sung / Lee Yong-Dae
3. (Indonesia) Markis Kido / Hendra Setiawan
4. (Denmark) Mathias Boe / Carsten Mogensen
5. (China) Cai Yun / Fu Haifeng
6. (Indonesia) Alvent Yulianto Chandra / Hendra Aprida Gunawan
7. (Malaysia) Mohd Zakry Abdul Latif / Mohd Fairuzizuan
8. (Denmark) Lars Paaske / Jonas Rasmussen

=== Results ===
Quarterfinals
1	(Malaysia) Koo Kien Keat (Malaysia) Tan Boon Heong	15	21	21
(South Korea) Cho Gun-Woo (South Korea) Shin Baek-cheol	21	18	18
(Chinese Taipei) Fang Chieh-Min (Chinese Taipei) Lee Sheng-Mu	21	22	17
(Chinese Taipei) Chen Hung-Ling (Chinese Taipei) Lin Yu-Lang	15	24	21
8	(Denmark) Lars Paaske (Denmark) Jonas Rasmussen	19	15
4	(Denmark) Mathias Boe (Denmark) Carsten Mogensen	21	21
(China) Guo Zhendong (China) Xu Chen	14	17
2	(South Korea) Jung Jae-Sung (South Korea) Lee Yong-Dae	21	21

Semifinals
1	(Malaysia) Koo Kien Keat (Malaysia) Tan Boon Heong	21	21
(Chinese Taipei) Chen Hung-Ling (Chinese Taipei) Lin Yu-Lang	15	13
4	(Denmark) Mathias Boe (Denmark) Carsten Mogensen	16	21	21
2	(South Korea) Jung Jae-Sung (South Korea) Lee Yong-Dae	21	19	23

Finals
1	(Malaysia) Koo Kien Keat (Malaysia) Tan Boon Heong	13	21	18
2	(South Korea) Jung Jae-Sung (South Korea) Lee Yong-Dae	21	19	21

== Women's doubles ==
=== Seeds ===
1. (China) Cheng Shu / Zhao Yunlei
2. (China) Du Jing / Yu Yang
3. (Malaysia) Chin Eei Hui / Wong Pei Tty
4. (China) Ma Jin / Wang Xiaoli
5. (South Korea) Ha Jung-Eun / Kim Min-Jung
6. (China) Tian Qing / Zhang Yawen
7. (Chinese Taipei) Chang Hsin-Yun / Chou Chia Chi
8. (Chinese Taipei) Chien Yu-Chin / Wang Pei-Rong

=== Results ===
Quarterfinals
1	(China) Cheng Shu (China) Zhao Yunlei	17	9
6	(China) Tian Qing (China) Zhang Yawen	21	21
3	(Malaysia) Chin Eei Hui (Malaysia) Wong Pei Tty	21	21
8	(Chinese Taipei) Chien Yu-Chin (Chinese Taipei) Wang Pei-Rong	16	17
5	(South Korea) Ha Jung-Eun (South Korea) Lee Kyung-Won	17	14
4	(China) Ma Jin (China) Wang Xiaoli	21	21
(Thailand) Duanganong Aroonkesorn (Thailand) Kunchala Voravichitchaikul	5	9
2	(China) Du Jing (China) Yu Yang	21	21

Semifinals
6	(China) Tian Qing (China) Zhang Yawen	21	21
3	(Malaysia) Chin Eei Hui (Malaysia) Wong Pei Tty	17	8
4	(China) Ma Jin (China) Wang Xiaoli	20	18
2	(China) Du Jing (China) Yu Yang	22	21

Finals
6	(China) Tian Qing (China) Zhang Yawen	21	21
2	(China) Du Jing (China) Yu Yang	14	14

== Mixed doubles ==
=== Seeds ===
1. (South Korea) Lee Yong-Dae / Lee Hyo-jung
2. (China) Zheng Bo / Ma Jin
3. (China) He Hanbin / Yu Yang
4. (Denmark) Joachim Fischer Nielsen / Christinna Pedersen
5. (India) Diju Valiyaveetil / Jwala Gutta
6. (China) Xie Zhongbo / Zhang Yawen
7. (Thailand) Songphon Anugritayawon / Kunchala Voravichitchaikul
8. (Thailand) Sudket Prapakamol / Saralee Thoungthongkam

=== Results ===
Quarterfinals
1	(South Korea) Lee Yong-Dae (South Korea) Lee Hyo-jung	21	21
(China) Tao Jiaming (China) Tian Qing	18	15
(Chinese Taipei) Chen Hung Ling (Chinese Taipei) Chou Chia Chi	21	17	16
7	(Thailand) Songphon Anugritayawon (Thailand) Kunchala Voravichitchaikul	11	21	21
(Indonesia) Devin Lahardi Fitriawan (Indonesia) Liliyana Natsir	14	21	14
(China) Zhang Nan (China) Zhao Yunlei	21	14	21
PFQ	(Chinese Taipei) Lee Sheng-Mu (Chinese Taipei) Chien Yu-Chin	12	16
2	(China) Zheng Bo (China) Ma Jin	21	21

Semifinals
1	(South Korea) Lee Yong-Dae (South Korea) Lee Hyo-jung	21	20	21
7	(Thailand) Songphon Anugritayawon (Thailand) Kunchala Voravichitchaikul	13	22	15
(China) Zhang Nan (China) Zhao Yunlei
2	(China) Zheng Bo (China) Ma Jin	w/o

Finals
1	(South Korea) Lee Yong-Dae (South Korea) Lee Hyo-jung	21	15	21
2	(China) Zheng Bo (China) Ma Jin	18	21	15

Preceded by 2008 China Open Super Series	China Open Super Series	Succeeded by 2010 China Open Super Series
Preceded by 2009 Hong Kong Super Series	BWF Super Series	Succeeded by 2009 BWF Super Series Masters Finals
