= 2009 Denmark Super Series =

2009 Denmark Super Series Premier
Tournament details
- Dates: 20–25 October 2009
- Venue: Odense Sports Park
- Location: Odense

The 2009 Denmark Super Series was a top level badminton competition held from October 20, 2009 to October 25, 2009 in Odense, Denmark. It was the ninth BWF Super Series competition on the 2009 BWF Super Series schedule.

== Men's singles ==
=== Seeds ===
1. (Denmark) Peter Gade
2. (Indonesia) Sony Dwi Kuncoro
3. (Denmark) Joachim Persson
4. (Malaysia) Wong Choong Hann
5. (Indonesia) Simon Santoso
6. (India) Chetan Anand
7. (Denmark) Jan Ø. Jørgensen
8. (China) Chen Long

=== Top half ===
First Round
1 | (Denmark) P Gade | 21 | 21
Q3 | (Sweden) H Hurskainen | 13 | 6
(India) A Pawar | 21 | 22
(France) M L Y Ping | 18 | 20
7 | (Denmark) J Ø Jørgensen | 21 | 23
(Denmark) H-K Vittinghus | 8 | 21
(France) B Leverdez | 12 | 10
(Netherlands) E Pang | 21 | 21
3 | (Denmark) J Persson | 21 | 21
(England) A Smith | 18 | 19
Q1 | (India) G Datt R.M.V. | 21 | 21
(Poland) P Wacha | 17 | 17
5 | (Indonesia) S Santoso | 21 | 21
(Japan) S Sasaki | 17 | 16
(India) A Bhat | 18 | 23 | 21
(England) C Baxter | 21 | 21 | 11

Second Round
1 | (Denmark) P Gade | 5
(India) A Pawar | 2^{r}
7 | (Denmark) J Ø Jørgensen | 9 | 21 | 21
(Netherlands) E Pang | 21 | 13 | 11
3 | (Denmark) J Persson | 21 | 12 | 19
Q1 | (India) G Datt R.M.V. | 17 | 21 | 21
5 | (Indonesia) S Santoso | 21 | 21
(India) A Bhat | 17 | 12

Quarterfinals
1 | (Denmark) P Gade | 21 | 17 | 16
7 | (Denmark) J Ø Jørgensen | 7 | 21 | 21
Q1 | (India) G Datt R.M.V. | 17 | 15
5 | (Indonesia) S Santoso | 21 | 21

Semifinals
7 | (Denmark) J Ø Jørgensen | 13 | 13
5 | (Indonesia) S Santoso | 21 | 21

=== Bottom half ===
First Round
(Japan) K Tago | 21 | 21
(India) A Sridhar | 17 | 16
(India) P Kashyap | 10 | 13
8 | (China) Chen L | 21 | 21
(England) R Ouseph | 17 | 21 | 11
(Malaysia) M H Hashim | 21 | 12 | 21
(Germany) M Zwiebler | 21 | 18 | 21
4 | (Malaysia) Wong C H | 18 | 21 | 12
Q2 | (Denmark) S Gavnholt | 21 | 17 | 21
(Finland) V Lång | 12 | 21 | 17
(Denmark) P Mikkelsen | 18 | 16
6 | (India) C Anand | 21 | 21
Q4 | (Denmark) C Lind Thomsen | 14 | 19
(Czech Republic) P Koukal | 21 | 21
(Netherlands) D Palyama | 14 | 21 | 9
2 | (Indonesia) S D Kuncoro | 21 | 15 | 21

Second Round
(Japan) K Tago | 21 | 18 | 17
8 | (China) Chen L | 15 | 21 | 21
(Malaysia) M H Hashim | 21 | 17 | 18
(Germany) M Zwiebler | 16 | 21 | 21
Q2 | (Denmark) S Gavnholt | 19 | 21 | 9
6 | (India) C Anand | 21 | 15 | 21
(Czech Republic) P Koukal | 17 | 16
2 | (Indonesia) S D Kuncoro | 21 | 21

Quarterfinals
8 | (China) Chen L | 16 | 13
(Germany) M Zwiebler | 21 | 21
6 | (India) C Anand | 17 | 14
2 | (Indonesia) S D Kuncoro | 21 | 21

Semifinals
(Germany) M Zwiebler | 21 | 16 | 21
2 | (Indonesia) S D Kuncoro | 10 | 21 | 15

=== Finals ===
Semifinals
7 | (Denmark) Jan Ø. Jørgensen | 13 | 13
5 | (Indonesia) Simon Santoso | 21 | 21
(Germany) Marc Zwiebler | 21 | 16 | 21
2 | (Indonesia) Sony Dwi Kuncoro | 10 | 21 | 15

Final
5 | (Indonesia) Simon Santoso | 21 | 21
(Germany) Marc Zwiebler | 14 | 6

== Women's singles ==
=== Seeds ===
1. (China) Wang Yihan
2. (Denmark) Tine Rasmussen
3. (France) Pi Hongyan
4. (India) Saina Nehwal
5. (Germany) Juliane Schenk
6. (Bulgaria) Petya Nedelcheva
7. (Indonesia) Adriyanti Firdasari
8. (Japan) Ai Goto

=== Top half ===
First Round
1 | (China) Wang YH | 21 | 21
Q3 | (Denmark) K Jørgensen | 18 | 10
(Republic of Ireland) C Magee | 21 | 22
(Canada) C Reid | 15 | 20
8 | (Japan) A Goto | 21 | 21
Q1 | (Denmark) A Mathiasen | 4 | 12
(Ukraine) L Griga | 18 | 21 | 21
(Czech Republic) K Ludíková | 21 | 8 | 11
4 | (India) S Nehwal | 19 | 21 | 21
(Russia) E Diehl | 21 | 15 | 16
(Denmark) C Sørensen | 21 | 23
(Germany) N Grether | 9 | 21
5 | (Germany) J Schenk | 17 | 15
(Japan) E Hirose | 21 | 21
Q2 | (Poland) O Konon | 21 | 21
Q4 | (Denmark) C Martens | 16 | 11

Second Round
1 | (China) Wang YH | 21 | 21
(Republic of Ireland) C Magee | 7 | 10
8 | (Japan) A Goto | 21 | 22
(Ukraine) L Griga | 17 | 20
4 | (India) S Nehwal | 21 | 21
(Denmark) C Sørensen | 15 | 14
(Japan) E Hirose | 21 | 21
Q2 | (Poland) O Konon | 15 | 18

Quarterfinals
1 | (China) Wang YH | 21 | 21
8 | (Japan) A Goto | 15 | 12
4 | (India) S Nehwal | 11 | 13
(Japan) E Hirose | 21 | 21

Semifinals
1 | (China) Wang YH | 21 | 19 | 21
(Japan) E Hirose | 13 | 21 | 11

=== Bottom half ===
First Round
(India) A Mutatkar | 21 | 21
(New Zealand) M Chan | 14 | 18
(Ukraine) E Prus | 5 | 11
6 | (Bulgaria) P Nedelcheva
(Netherlands) Yao J | 21 | 21
(Slovenia) M Tvrdy | 16 | 9
(Bulgaria) L Zetchiri | 14 | 20
3 | (France) Pi HY | 21 | 22
(Scotland) S Eglestaff | 15 | 13
(England) E Cann | 21 | 21
(Sweden) S Hansson | 19 | 12
7 | (Indonesia) A Firdasari | 21 | 21
(Japan) M Taruno | 13 | 21 | 21
(Finland) A Nieminen | 21 | 13 | 16
(Netherlands) J Meulendijks | 11 | 7
2 | (Denmark) T Rasmussen | 21 | 21

Second Round
(India) A Mutatkar | 17 | 8
6 | (Bulgaria) P Nedelcheva | 21 | 21
(Netherlands) Yao J | 21 | 21
3 | (France) Pi HY | 19 | 15
(England) E Cann | 15 | 12
7 | (Indonesia) A Firdasari | 21 | 21
(Japan) M Taruno | 15 | 18
2 | (Denmark) T Rasmussen | 21 | 21

Quarterfinals
6 | (Bulgaria) P Nedelcheva | 12 | 8
(Netherlands) Yao J | 21 | 21
7 | (Indonesia) A Firdasari | 21 | 13 | 15
2 | (Denmark) T Rasmussen | 11 | 21 | 21

Semifinals
(Netherlands) Yao J | 18 | 14
2 | (Denmark) T Rasmussen | 21 | 21

=== Finals ===
Semifinals
1 | (China) Wang Yihan | 21 | 19 | 21
(Japan) Eriko Hirose | 13 | 21 | 11
(Netherlands) Yao Jie | 18 | 14
2 | (Denmark) Tine Rasmussen | 21 | 21

Final
1 | (China) Wang Yihan | 18 | 21 | 14
2 | (Denmark) Tine Rasmussen | 21 | 19 | 21

== Men's doubles ==
=== Seeds ===
1. (Indonesia) Markis Kido / Hendra Setiawan
2. (Malaysia) Koo Kien Keat / Tan Boon Heong (Champion)
3. (Denmark) Mathias Boe / Carsten Mogensen
4. (Malaysia) Mohd Zakry Abdul Latif / Mohd Fairuzizuan Mohd Tazari
5. (Indonesia) Alvent Yulianto Chandra / Hendra Aprida Gunawan
6. (Denmark) Lars Påske / Jonas Rasmussen
7. (England) Anthony Clark / Nathan Robertson
8. (China) Xu Chen / Guo Zhendong

=== Top half ===
First Round
1 | (Indonesia) M Kido (Indonesia) H Setiawan | 21 | 21
(Poland) M Łogosz (Poland) R Mateusiak | 17 | 13
(England) C Langridge (England) R Middleton | 16 | 22 | 21
Q2 | (England) M Ellis (England) P Mills | 21 | 20 | 13
8 | (China) Xu C (China) Guo ZH | 2
(Poland) A Cwałina (Poland) W Skudlarczyk | 1^{r}
(Denmark) M Conrad-Petersen (Denmark) M Pieler Kolding | 21 | 18 | 18
(Japan) K Hayakawa (Japan) K Kazuno | 11 | 21 | 21
3 | (Denmark) M Boe (Denmark) C Mogensen | 21 | 21
(England) A Ellis (England) D George | 13 | 19
(Japan) H Hashimoto (Japan) N Hirata | 21 | 21
PFQ | (Denmark) N Bach (Denmark) M Kragh | 18 | 12
7 | (England) A Clark (England) N Robertson | 21 | 21
Q1 | (France) B Careme (France) S Grosjean | 14 | 16
(England) C Adcock (Scotland) R Blair | 5
PFQ | (Germany) M Niesner (Germany) T Zander | 5^{r}

Second Round
1 | (Indonesia) M Kido (Indonesia) H Setiawan | 23 | 21
(England) C Langridge (England) R Middleton | 21 | 15
8 | (China) Xu C (China) Guo ZH | 21 | 21
(Japan) K Hayakawa (Japan) K Kazuno | 17 | 19
3 | (Denmark) M Boe (Denmark) C Mogensen | 21 | 21
(Japan) H Hashimoto (Japan) N Hirata | 15 | 19
7 | (England) A Clark (England) N Robertson | 21 | 21 | 18
(England) C Adcock (Scotland) R Blair | 11 | 23 | 21

Quarterfinals
1 | (Indonesia) M Kido (Indonesia) H Setiawan | 21 | 22
8 | (China) Xu C (China) Guo ZD | 17 | 20
3 | (Denmark) M Boe (Denmark) C Mogensen | 21 | 21
(England) C Adcock (Scotland) R Blair | 16 | 19

Semifinals
1 | (Indonesia) M Kido (Indonesia) H Setiawan | 16 | 19
3 | (Denmark) M Boe (Denmark) C Mogensen | 21 | 21

=== Bottom half ===
First Round
(India) A Dewalker (India) J Sanyal | 11 | 10
(China) Sun JJ (China) Tao JM | 21 | 21
(Denmark) R Bonde (Denmark) S Mollyhus | 24 | 21
5 | (Indonesia) A Y Chandra (Indonesia) H A Gunawan | 22 | 17
(India) R Kumar K.T. (India) S Thomas
(Denmark) K Henriksen (Denmark) A Kristiansen
Q3 | (Denmark) M Bue (Denmark) R Lindskow | 11 | 14
4 | (Malaysia) M Z A Latif (Malaysia) M F M Tazari | 21 | 21
(Indonesia) M Ahsan (Indonesia) B Septano
Q4 | (Denmark) M Beyer (Denmark) M Jensen
PFQ | (New Zealand) O Leydon-Davis (New Zealand) H Tam | 12 | 12
6 | (Denmark) L Påske (Denmark) J Rasmussen | 21 | 21
(Indonesia) Y S Dasuki (Indonesia) R Sukmawan | 21 | 22
(Germany) M Fuchs (Germany) I Kindervater | 14 | 20
(Denmark) M Elbjorn Larsen (Denmark) C Skovgård | 10 | 21 | 10
2 | (Malaysia) Koo K K (Malaysia) Tan B H | 21 | 19 | 21

Second Round
(China) Sun JJ (China) Tao JM | 21 | 21
(Denmark) R Bonde (Denmark) S Mollyhus | 15 | 16
(Denmark) K Henriksen (Denmark) A Kristiansen | 14 | 21 | 21
4 | (Malaysia) M Z A Latif (Malaysia) M F M Tazari | 21 | 17 | 19
(Indonesia) M Ahsan (Indonesia) B Septano | 16 | 10
6 | (Denmark) L Påske (Denmark) J Rasmussen | 21 | 21
(Indonesia) Y S Dasuki (Indonesia) R Sukmawan | 21 | 19 | 19
2 | (Malaysia) Koo K K (Malaysia) Tan B H | 16 | 21 | 21

Quarterfinals
(China) Sun JJ (China) Tao JM | 19 | 21 | 21
(Denmark) K Henriksen (Denmark) A Kristiansen | 21 | 19 | 16
6 | (Denmark) L Påske (Denmark) J Rasmussen | 11 | 16
2 | (Malaysia) Koo K K (Malaysia) Tan B H | 21 | 21

Semifinals
(China) Sun JJ (China) Tao JM | 14 | 16
2 | (Malaysia) Koo K K (Malaysia) Tan B H | 21 | 21

=== Finals ===
Semifinals
1 | (Indonesia) Markis Kido (Indonesia) Hendra Setiawan | 16 | 19
3 | (Denmark) Mathias Boe (Denmark) Carsten Mogensen | 21 | 21
(China) Sun Junjie (China) Tao Jiaming | 14 | 16
2 | (Malaysia) Koo Kien Keat (Malaysia) Tan Boon Heong | 21 | 21

Final
3 | (Denmark) Mathias Boe (Denmark) Carsten Mogensen | 22 | 14 | 17
2 | (Malaysia) Koo Kien Keat (Malaysia) Tan Boon Heong | 20 | 21 | 21

== Women's doubles ==
=== Seeds ===
1. (Malaysia) Chin Eei Hui / Wong Pei Tty
2. (Denmark) Kamilla Rytter Juhl / Lena Frier Kristiansen
3. (Indonesia) Shendy Puspa Irawati / Meiliana Jauhari
4. (Indonesia) Nitya Krishinda Maheswari / Greysia Polii
5. (Japan) Miyuki Maeda / Satoko Suetsuna
6. (China) Pan Pan / Zhang Yawen
7. (Japan) Mizuki Fujii / Reika Kakiiwa
8. (Denmark) Helle Nielsen / Marie Røpke

=== Top half ===
First Round
(Poland) M Kurdelska (Poland) A Wojtkowska | 12 | 12
(Denmark) L Damkjær Kruse (Denmark) M Schjøtt-Kristensen | 21 | 21
(Scotland) E Mason (England) H Olver | 21 | 21
(Germany) N Grether (Canada) C Reid | 16 | 13
(Macau) Zhang D (Macau) Zhang ZB | 21 | 21
(Ukraine) A Kobceva (Ukraine) E Prus | 9 | 6
8 | (Denmark) H Nielsen (Denmark) M Røpke | 16 | 23 | 18
(Bulgaria) P Nedelcheva (Russia) A Russkikh | 21 | 21 | 21
(England) M Agathangelou (Scotland) J Cooper | 24 | 21 | 21
(Sweden) E Lennartsson (Sweden) E Wengberg | 26 | 17 | 19

Second Round
1 | (Malaysia) Chin E H (Malaysia) Wong P T | 21 | 22
(Denmark) L Damkjær Kruse (Denmark) M Schjøtt-Kristensen | 16 | 20
6 | (China) Pan P (China) Zhang YW | 21 | 21
(Scotland) E Mason (England) H Olver | 16 | 7
4 | (Indonesia) N K Maheswari (Indonesia) G Polii | 21 | 19 | 14
(Macau) Zhang D (Macau) Zhang ZB | 13 | 21 | 21
(Bulgaria) P Nedelcheva (Russia) A Russkikh | 21 | 21
(England) M Agathangelou (Scotland) J Cooper | 13 | 12

Quarterfinals
1 | (Malaysia) Chin E H (Malaysia) Wong P T | 21 | 17 | 12
6 | (China) Pan P (China) Zhang YW | 11 | 21 | 21
(Macau) Zhang D (Macau) Zhang ZB | 21 | 19 | 21
(Bulgaria) P Nedelcheva (Russia) A Russkikh | 16 | 21 | 8

Semifinals
6 | (China) Pan P (China) Zhang YW | 21 | 21
(Macau) Zhang D (Macau) Zhang ZB | 15 | 15

=== Bottom half ===
First Round
(Denmark) L Bonde (Denmark) L Hansen | 19 | 14^{r}
(France) L Choinet (France) W Rahmawati | 21 | 16
(Japan) S Matsuo (Japan) M Naito | 21 | 21
7 | (Japan) M Fujii (Japan) R Kakiiwa | 13 | 16
(Denmark) M Helsbol (Denmark) A Skelbæk | 21 | 21
(Denmark) J Christiansen (Denmark) M Sejr Nielsen | 13 | 14
(India) J Gutta (India) A Ponnappa | 21 | 19 | 21
(England) J Wallwork (England) G White | 15 | 21 | 11
(New Zealand) D Barry (New Zealand) D Haliday | 9 | 8
5 | (Japan) M Maeda (Japan) S Suetsuna | 21 | 21
(Denmark) C Juel (Denmark) M Schytt | 18 | 15
(Denmark) G Haxen (Czech Republic) K Ludíková | 21 | 21

Second Round
(France) L Choinet (France) W Rahmawati | 12 | 15
(Japan) S Matsuo (Japan) M Naito | 21 | 21
(Denmark) M Helsbol (Denmark) A Skelbæk | 15 | 13
3 | (Indonesia) S P Irawati (Indonesia) M Jauhari | 21 | 21
(India) J Gutta (India) A Ponnappa | 21 | 14 | 19
5 | (Japan) M Maeda (Japan) S Suetsuna | 18 | 21 | 21
(Denmark) G Haxen (Czech Republic) K Ludíková | 14 | 13
2 | (Denmark) K Rytter Juhl (Denmark) L Frier Kristiansen | 21 | 21

Quarterfinals
(Japan) S Matsuo (Japan) M Naito | 21 | 21
3 | (Indonesia) S P Irawati (Indonesia) M Jauhari | 18 | 18
5 | (Japan) M Maeda (Japan) S Suetsuna | 21 | 19 | 19
2 | (Denmark) K Rytter Juhl (Denmark) L Frier Kristiansen | 12 | 21 | 21

Semifinals
(Japan) S Matsuo (Japan) M Naito | 21 | 18 | 19
2 | (Denmark) K Rytter Juhl (Denmark) L Frier Kristiansen | 19 | 21 | 21

=== Finals ===
Semifinals
6 | (China) Pan Pan (China) Zhang Yawen | 21 | 21
(Macau) Zhang Dan (Macau) Zhang Zhibo | 15 | 15
(Japan) Shizuka Matsuo (Japan) Mami Naito | 21 | 18 | 19
2 | (Denmark) Kamilla Rytter Juhl (Denmark) Lena Frier Kristiansen | 19 | 21 | 21

Final
6 | (China) Pan Pan (China) Zhang Yawen | 22 | 18 | 21
2 | (Denmark) Kamilla Rytter Juhl (Denmark) Lena Frier Kristiansen | 20 | 21 | 12

== Mixed doubles ==
=== Seeds ===
1. (Indonesia) Nova Widianto / Lilyana Natsir
2. (Denmark) Joachim Fischer Nielsen / Christinna Pedersen
3. (Denmark) Thomas Laybourn / Kamilla Rytter Juhl
4. (India) Valiyaveetil Diju / Jwala Gutta
5. (Indonesia) Hendra Aprida Gunawan / Vita Marissa
6. (China) Tao Jiaming / Zhang Yawen
7. (England) Anthony Clark / Donna Kellogg
8. (Indonesia) Devin Lahardi Fitriawan / Lita Nurlita

=== Top half ===
First Round
1 | (Indonesia) N Widianto (Indonesia) L Natsir | 21 | 21
(Malaysia) Gan T C (Russia) A Russkikh | 16 | 13
(Japan) N Hirata (Japan) M Maeda | 22 | 20 | 17
(Denmark) R Bonde (Denmark) M Rœpke | 20 | 22 | 21
6 | (China) Tao JM (China) Zhang YW | 21 | 21
Q3 | (Republic of Ireland) S Magee (Republic of Ireland) C Magee | 4 | 17
(Ukraine) V Atrashchenkov (Ukraine) E Prus | 22 | 14 | 16
(Denmark) M Delbo Larsen (Denmark) M Schjott-Kristensen | 20 | 21 | 21
PFQ | (England) C Langridge (Scotland) J Cooper | 17 | 13
(England) N Robertson (England) J Wallwork | 21 | 21
(France) B Careme (France) L Choinet | 18 | 10
Q4 | (Japan) K Hayakawa (Japan) S Matsuo | 21 | 21
7 | (England) A Clark (England) D Kellogg | 23 | 21 | 21
(Malaysia) Koo K K (Malaysia) Wong P T | 25 | 16 | 11
PFQ | (Denmark) M Conrad-Petersen (Denmark) A Skelbæk | 19 | 8
Q2 | (Japan) S Ikeda (Japan) R Shiota | 21 | 21

Second Round
1 | (Indonesia) N Widianto (Indonesia) L Natsir | 18 | 21 | 21
(Denmark) R Bonde (Denmark) M Rœpke | 21 | 7 | 10
6 | (China) Tao JM (China) Zhang YW | 21 | 21
(Denmark) M Delbo Larsen (Denmark) M Schjott-Kristensen | 16 | 13
(England) N Robertson (England) J Wallwork | 14 | 21 | 21
Q4 | (Japan) K Hayakawa (Japan) S Matsuo | 21 | 15 | 16
7 | (England) A Clark (England) D Kellogg | 21 | 21
Q2 | (Japan) S Ikeda (Japan) R Shiota | 17 | 14

Quarterfinals
1 | (Indonesia) N Widianto (Indonesia) L Natsir | 21 | 17 | 13
6 | (China) Tao JM (China) Zhang YW | 10 | 21 | 21
(England) N Robertson (England) J Wallwork | 10 | 21 | 11
7 | (England) A Clark (England) D Kellogg | 21 | 10 | 21

Semifinals
6 | (China) Tao JM (China) Zhang YW | 18 | 17
7 | (England) A Clark (England) D Kellogg | 21 | 21

=== Bottom half ===
First Round
(Poland) R Mateusiak (Poland) N Kostiuczyk | 3
(Poland) W Szkudlarczyk (Poland) A Wojtkowska | 0^{r}
(New Zealand) H Tam (New Zealand) D Haliday | 14 | 12
5 | (Indonesia) H A Gunawan (Indonesia) V Marissa | 21 | 21
(Poland) A Cwałina (Poland) M Kurdelska | 15 | 10
(England) C Adcock (England) G White | 21 | 21
(England) R Middleton (England) M Agathangelou | 20 | 10
4 | (India) Diju V. (India) J Gutta | 22 | 21
(Japan) H Hashimoto (Japan) M Fujii | 21 | 21
Q1 | (Denmark) M Pieler Kolding (Denmark) L Kruse | 16 | 18
(Indonesia) F Kurniawan (Indonesia) P Z Bernadeth | 19 | 12
8 | (Indonesia) D L Fitriawan (Indonesia) L Nurlita | 21 | 21
(Bulgaria) S Makarski (Bulgaria) D Dimova | 23 | 21
(Denmark) C Skovgård (Denmark) M Helsbol | 21 | 12
(England) M Ellis (England) H Olver | 17 | 14
2 | (Denmark) J Fischer Nielsen (Denmark) C Pedersen | 21 | 21

Second Round
(Poland) R Mateusiak (Poland) N Kostiuczyk | 21 | 21
5 | (Indonesia) H A Gunawan (Indonesia) V Marissa | 15 | 13
(England) C Adcock (England) G White | 11 | 22 | 21
4 | (India) Diju V. (India) J Gutta | 21 | 20 | 19
(Japan) H Hashimoto (Japan) M Fujii | 13 | 15
8 | (Indonesia) D L Fitriawan (Indonesia) L Nurlita | 21 | 21
(Bulgaria) S Makarski (Bulgaria) D Dimova | 13 | 8
2 | (Denmark) J Fischer Nielsen (Denmark) C Pedersen | 21 | 21

Quarterfinals
(Poland) R Mateusiak (Poland) N Kostiuczyk | 21 | 21
(England) C Adcock (England) G White | 9 | 7
8 | (Indonesia) D L Fitriawan (Indonesia) L Nurlita | 19 | 12
2 | (Denmark) J Fischer Nielsen (Denmark) C Pedersen | 21 | 21

Semifinals
(Poland) R Mateusiak (Poland) N Kostiuczyk | 18 | 21 | 21
2 | (Denmark) J Fischer Nielsen (Denmark) C Pedersen | 21 | 19 | 23

=== Finals ===
Semifinals
6 | (China) Tao Jiaming (China) Zhang Yawen | 18 | 17
7 | (England) Anthony Clark (England) Donna Kellogg | 21 | 21
(Poland) Robert Mateusiak (Poland) Nadiezda Kostiuczyk | 18 | 21 | 21
2 | (Denmark) Joachim Fischer Nielsen (Denmark) C Pedersen | 21 | 19 | 23

Final
7 | (England) Anthony Clark (England) Donna Kellogg | 16 | 27 | 17
2 | (Denmark) Joachim Fischer Nielsen (Denmark) Christinna Pedersen | 21 | 25 | 21

| Preceded by 2008 Denmark Super Series | Denmark Super Series | Succeeded by 2010 Denmark Super Series |
| Preceded by 2009 Japan Super Series | 2009 BWF Super Series | Succeeded by 2009 French Super Series |
