= 2009 China Masters Super Series =

The 2009 China Masters Super Series was a top level badminton competition which was held from September 15, 2009 to September 20, 2009 in Changzhou, China. It was the seventh BWF Super Series competition on the 2009 BWF Super Series schedule. The total purse for the event was $250,000.

== Men's singles ==
=== Seeds ===
1. (Malaysia) Lee Chong Wei
2. (China) Chen Jin
3. (Denmark) Peter Gade
4. (China) Lin Dan
5. (Denmark) Joachim Persson
6. (South Korea) Park Sung Hwan
7. (Thailand) Boonsak Ponsana
8. (Malaysia) Wong Choong Hann

=== Results ===
1st round
1	(Malaysia) Lee Chong Wei	21	21
(China) Lu Qicheng	8	16
(England) Rajiv Ouseph	21	12	21
(Thailand) Tanongsak Saensomboonsuk	8	21	17
5	(Denmark) Joachim Persson	21	21
Q1	(China) Liu Jingru	16	15
(China) Du Pengyu	21	21
(Denmark) Christian Lind Thomsen	9	9
4	(China) Lin Dan	21	21
(China) Qiu Yanbo	13	13
Q2	(China) Li Yu	21	20	12
(Chinese Taipei) Hsieh Yu-hsing	19	22	21
6	(South Korea) Park Sung Hwan	21	22
Q4	(China) Wang Zhengming	18	20
(South Korea) Hong Ji Hoon	18	24	15
(Hong Kong) Hu Yun	21	22	21
(England) Andrew Smith	21	5	21
(Hong Kong) Chan Yan Kit	19	21	15
(Lithuania) Kestutis Navickas	18	16
7	(Thailand) Boonsak Ponsana	21	21
Q3	(China) Zhang Seng	20	14
(South Korea) Shon Wan-Ho	22	21
(Scotland) Alistair Casey	8	8
3	(Denmark) Peter Gade	21	21
PFQ	(China) Qiao Bin	21	18	19
(China) Gao Huan	18	21	21
(China) Chen Long	21	21
8	(Malaysia) Wong Choong Hann	9	17
(China) Bao Chunlai	21	21
(Israel) Misha Zilberman	10	12
(China) Zhou Wenlong	17	10
2	(China) Chen Jin	21	21

2nd round
1	(Malaysia) Lee Chong Wei	21	21
(Denmark) Rajiv Ouseph	15	8
5	(Denmark) Joachim Persson	22	14	20
(China) Du Pengyu	20	21	22
4	(China) Lin Dan	21	21
(Chinese Taipei) Hsieh Yu-Hsing	15	19
6	(South Korea) Park Sung Hwan	22	21
(Hong Kong) Hu Yun	20	17
(England) Andrew Smith	10	9
(Thailand) Boonsak Ponsana	21	21
(South Korea) Shon Wan-Ho	11	21	13
3	(Denmark) Peter Gade	21	18	21
(China) Gao Huan	12	11
(China) Chen Long	21	21
(China) Bao Chunlai	21	14	19
2	(China) Chen Jin	13	21	21

Quarterfinals
1	(Malaysia) Lee Chong Wei	21	21
(China) Du Pengyu	19	15
4	(China) Lin Dan	21	13	23
6	(South Korea) Park Sung Hwan	15	21	21
7	(Thailand) Boonsak Ponsana	21	19	21
3	(Denmark) Peter Gade	16	21	18
(China) Chen Long	16	21	16
2	(China) Chen Jin	21	8	21

Semifinals
1	(Malaysia) Lee Chong Wei	20	21	7
4	(China) Lin Dan	22	15	21
Finals
4	(China) Lin Dan	21	21
7	(Thailand) Boonsak Ponsana	17	17
7	(Thailand) Boonsak Ponsana	21	4	21
2	(China) Chen Jin	16	21	19

== Women's singles ==
=== Seeds ===
1. (Hong Kong) Zhou Mi
2. (China) Wang Lin
3. (Denmark) Tine Rasmussen
4. (China) Wang Yihan
5. (China) Lu Lan
6. (China) Xie Xingfang
7. (France) Pi Hongyan
8. (Hong Kong) Wang Chen

=== Results ===
1st round
1	(Hong Kong) Zhou Mi	21	21
(South Korea) Jang Soo-Young	15	18
(Japan) Shizuka Uchida	21	21
(Finland) Anu Nieminen	18	12
5	(China) Lu Lan	21	21
(China) Zhu Lin	13	9
(Malaysia) Wong Mew Choo	17	11
(China) Jiang Yanjiao	21	21
4	(China) Wang Yihan	21	15	21
(South Korea) Bae Seung-Hee	15	21	17
Q4	(China) Liu Xin	21	21
PFQ	(Japan) Ayaka Takahashi	11	14
8	(Hong Kong) Wang Chen	21	23
(Germany) Nicole Grether	13	21
(China) Wang Shixian	21	21
(China) Han Li	16	11
(Japan) Kaori Imabeppu	21	21
(Singapore) Zhang Beiwen	17	11
(Hong Kong) Yip Pui Yin	29	18
7	(France) Pi Hongyan	30	21
PFQ	(China) Wang Xin	21	21
Q2	(China) Li Xuerui	16	15
Q3	(China) Zhang Yuchun	21	15	13
3	(Denmark) Tine Rasmussen	12	21	21
(Thailand) Salakjit Ponsana	21	19	16
(South Korea) Kim Moon Hi	14	21	21
(Bulgaria) Petya Nedelcheva	21	23
PFQ	(Japan) Misaki Matsutomo	13	21
(Germany) Juliane Schenk	21	21
(Canada) Charmaine Reid	13	11
(Thailand) Porntip Buranaprasertsuk	14	13
2	(China) Wang Lin	21	21

2nd round
1	(Hong Kong) Zhou Mi	21	21
(Japan) Shizuka Uchida	7	17
5	(China) Lu Lan	23	21
(China) Jiang Yanjiao	21	15
4	(China) Wang Yihan	21	21
Q4	(China) Liu Xin	8	12
8	(Hong Kong) Wang Chen	11	0r
(China) Wang Shixian	21	5
(Japan) Kaori Imabeppu	21	17	18
7	(France) Pi Hongyan	16	21	21
(China) Wang Xin	17	21	21
3	(Denmark) Tine Rasmussen	21	16	14
(South Korea) Kim Moon Hi	18	21	21
(China) Petya Nedelcheva	21	9	10
(Germany) Juliane Schenk	12	19
2	(China) Wang Lin	21	21

Quarterfinals
1	(Hong Kong) Zhou Mi	10	17
5	(China) Lu Lan	21	21
4	(China) Wang Yihan	18	18
(China) Wang Shixian	21	21
7	(France) Pi Hongyan	11	10
PFQ	(China) Wang Xin	21	21
6	(South Korea) Kim Moon Hi	19	18
2	(China) Wang Lin	21	21

Semifinals
5	(China) Lu Lan	21	11	14
(China) Wang Shixian	16	21	21
Finals
(China) Wang Shixian	21	14	21
2	(China) Wang Lin	14	21	14
PFQ	(China) Wang Xin	13	21	12
2	(China) Wang Lin	21	14	21

== Men's doubles ==
=== Seeds ===
1. (South Korea) Jung Jae-Sung / Lee Yong-Dae
2. (China) Cai Yun / Fu Haifeng
3. (Malaysia) Choong Tan Fook / Lee Wan Wah
4. (Malaysia) Gan Teik Chai / Tan Bin Shen
5. (Chinese Taipei) Chen Hung Ling / Lin Yu Lang
6. (Malaysia) Chan Chong Ming / Chew Choon Eng
7. (China) Guo Zhendong / Xu Chen
8. (South Korea) Cho Gun-Woo / Yoo Yeon-Seong

=== Result ===
Quarterfinals
(China) Li Rui (China) Rao Yuqiang	13	13
7	(China) Guo Zhendong (China) Xu Chen	21	21
3	(Malaysia) Choong Tan Fook (Malaysia) Lee Wan Wah	21	22
(China) Li Tian (China) Shen Ye	13	20
8	(South Korea) Cho Gun-Woo (South Korea) Yoo Yeon-Seong	21	21
4	(Malaysia) Gan Teik Chai (Malaysia) Tan Bin Shen	18	15
5	(South Korea) Ko Sung-Hyun (South Korea) Kwon Yi-Goo	11	10
2	(China) Cai Yun (China) Fu Haifeng	21	21

Semifinals
7	(China) Guo Zhendong (China) Xu Chen	21	21
3	(Malaysia) Choong Tan Fook (Malaysia) Lee Wan Wah	12	19
8	(South Korea) Cho Gun-Woo (South Korea) Yoo Yeon-Seong	21	16	15
2	(China) Cai Yun (China) Fu Haifeng	16	21	21

Finals
7	(China) Guo Zhendong (China) Xu Chen	w/o
2	(China) Cai Yun (China) Fu Haifeng

== Women's doubles ==
=== Seeds ===
1. (China) Cheng Shu / Zhao Yunlei
2. (South Korea) Ha Jung-Eun / Kim Min-Jung
3. (China) Du Jing / Yu Yang
4. (China) Pan Pan / Tian Qing
5. (China) Ma Jin / Wang Xiaoli
6. (China) Yang Wei / Zhang Jiewen
7. (China) Gao Ling / Wei Yili
8. (Macau) Zhang Dan / Zhang Zhibo

=== Results ===
Quarterfinals
1	(China) Cheng Shu (China) Zhao Yunlei	21	21
8	(Macau) Zhang Dan (Macau) Zhang Zhibo	18	16
4	(China) Pan Pan (China) Tian Qing	21	21
6	(China) Yang Wei (China) Zhang Jiewen	16	19
5	(China) Ma Jin (China) Wang Xiaoli	21	12	12
3	(China) Du Jing (China) Yu Yang	19	21	21
7	(China) Gao Ling (China) Wei Yili	21	21
2	(South Korea) Ha Jung-Eun (South Korea) Kim Min-Jung	12	17

Semifinals
1	(China) Cheng Shu (China) Zhao Yunlei	21	21
4	(China) Pan Pan (China) Tian Qing	11	13
3	(China) Du Jing (China) Yu Yang	21	21
7	(China) Gao Ling (China) Wei Yili	9	17

Finals
1	(China) Cheng Shu (China) Zhao Yunlei	15	15
3	(China) Du Jing (China) Yu Yang	21	21

== Mixed doubles ==
=== Seeds ===
1. (South Korea) Lee Yong-Dae / Lee Hyo-jung
2. (China) He Hanbin / Yu Yang
3. (China) Xie Zhongbo / Zhang Yawen
4. (Hong Kong) Yohan Hadikusumo Wiratama / Chau Hoi Wah
5. (China) Shen Ye / Ma Jin
6. (Thailand) Songphon Anugritayawon / Kunchala Voravichitchaikul
7. (China) Yoo Yeon-Seong / Kim Min-Jung
8. (China) Chen Zhiben / Zhang Jinkang

=== Results ===
Quarterfinals
(China) Liu Peixuan (China) Luo Yu	15	17
8	(China) Chen Zhiben (China) Zhang Jinkang	21	21
(China) Tao Jiaming (China) Wang Xiaoli	24	24
(China) Xu Chen (China) Zhao Yunlei	22	22
(China) Zheng Bo (China) Tian Qing	13	18
3	(China) Xie Zhongbo (China) Zhang Yawen	21	21
(South Korea) Ko Sung-Hyun (South Korea) Ha Jung-Eun	15	17
2	(China) He Hanbin (China) Yu Yang	21	21

Semifinals
8	(China) Chen Zhiben (China) Zhang Jinkang	15	12
(China) Tao Jiaming (China) Wang Xiaoli	21	21
3	(China) Xie Zhongbo (China) Zhang Yawen	21	26
2	(China) He Hanbin (China) Yu Yang	13	24

Finals
(China) Tao Jiaming (China) Wang Xiaoli	13	21	8
3	(China) Xie Zhongbo (China) Zhang Yawen	21	19	4r

Preceded by 2008 China Masters Super Series	China Masters Super Series	Succeeded by 2010 China Masters Super Series
Preceded by 2009 Indonesia Super Series	BWF Super Series	Succeeded by 2009 Japan Super Series
