= Zhang Zhibo =

Chinese badminton player (born 1982)

Zhang Zhibo 張之博
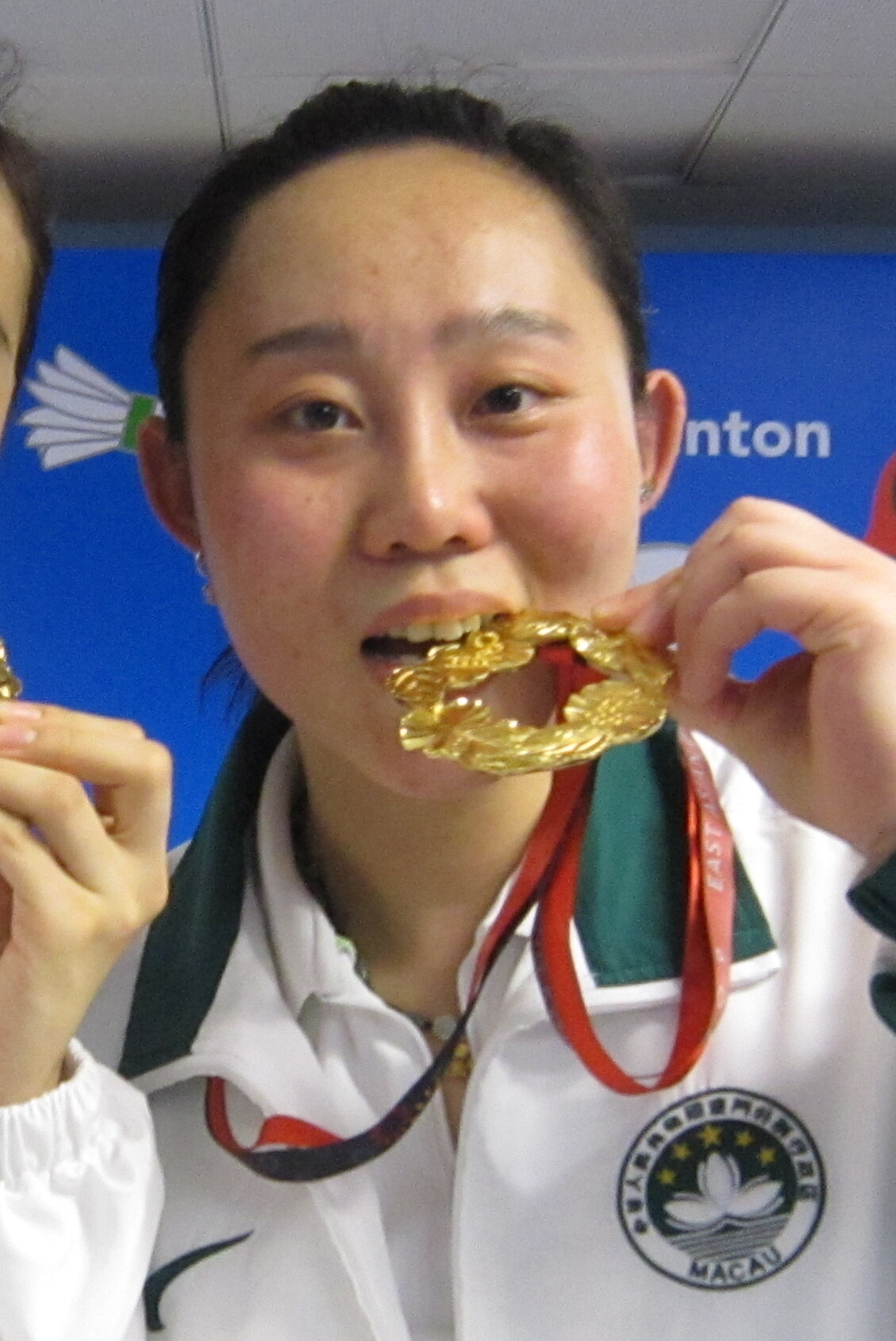
- Zhang with her 2009 East Asian Games gold medal

Personal information
- Born: 23 March 1982 (age 44) Liaoning, China
- Height: 1.66 m (5 ft 5 in)
- Weight: 56 kg (123 lb)

Sport
- Country: China; Macau
- Sport: Badminton
- Handedness: Left

Women's doubles
- Highest ranking: 23 (5 Aug 2010)
- BWF profile
Medal record
Badminton
Representing Macau
East Asian Games
Gold medal – first place	2009 Hong Kong	Women's doubles

Zhang Zhibo (Chinese: 張之博; pinyin: Zhāng Zhībó; born 23 March 1982) is a Chinese female badminton player and in 2008 she started representing Macau.

== Career ==
In 2004, she became the mixed doubles champion of the Chinese National Badminton Championships partnered with Liu Zhiyuan. In 2007, she became the women's doubles semifinalist of the Korea International Challenge tournament partnered with Zhang Dan.

In 2008, she became the women's doubles runner-up of the China Masters tournament partnered with Zhang Dan. They were defeated by Cheng Shu and Zhao Yunlei of China in straight games 21–14, 21–11. In 2009, she won the gold medal at the East Asian Games in women's doubles event after they beat the top seeds from China, Ma Jin and Wang Xiaoli with the score 22–20, 21–16. She also became the women's doubles semifinalist of the Macau and Denmark Open tournaments. At Macau, she and her partner Zhang Dan defeated by the 2008 Olympic Games gold medalist Du Jing and Yu Yang with the score 21–10, 21–17; and at Denmark, they were defeated by Pan Pan and Zhang Yawen of China.

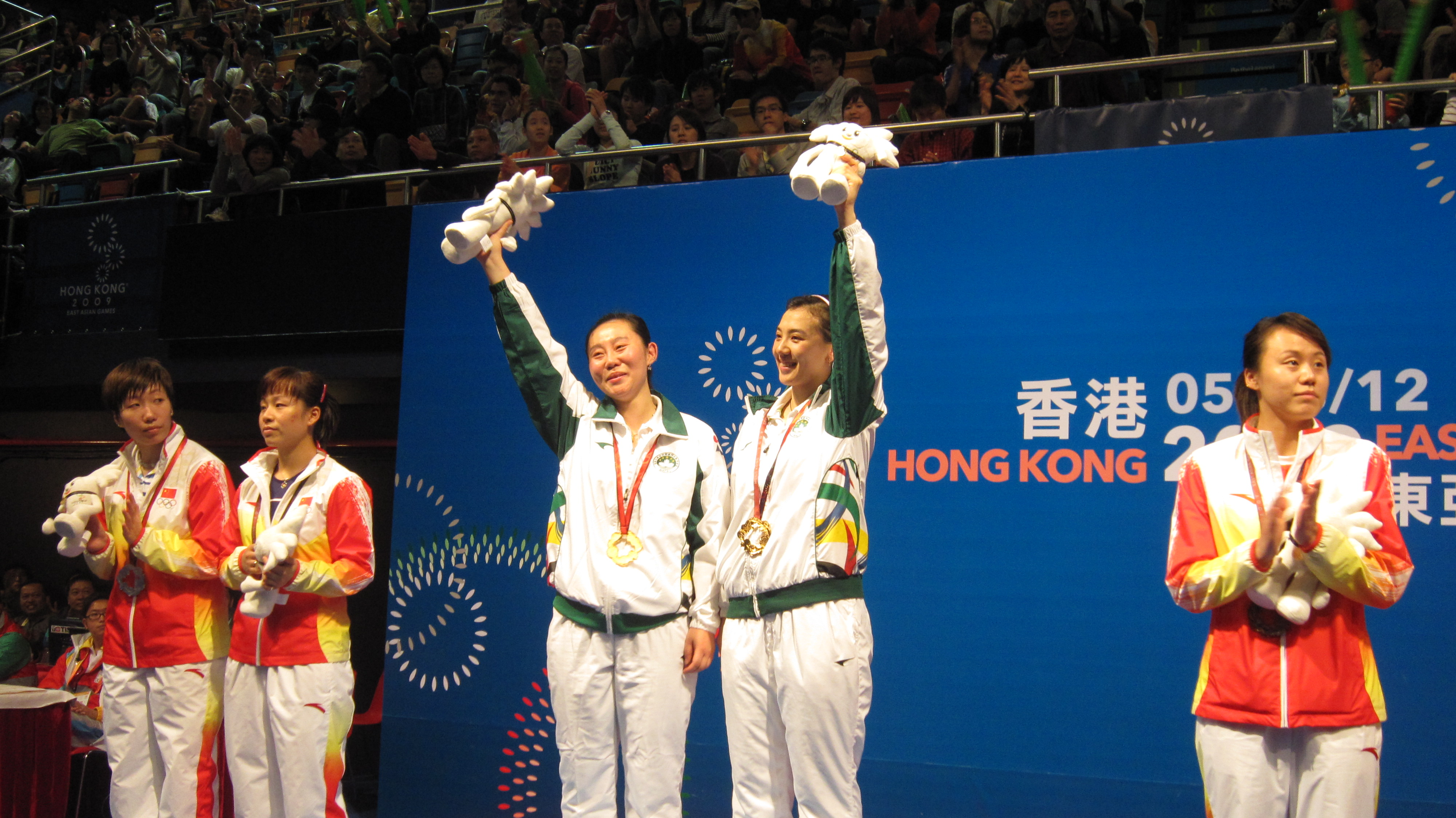
Zhang (center) won the women's doubles gold medal at the 2009 Hong Kong East Asian Games

In 2010, she qualified to represent Macau at the Asian Games. However, in accordance with the competition rules, players must be three years after they last competed for their country of origin before they will be able to represent the country, so her entry qualification was canceled; the Macau team also decided to withdraw from the competition.

In 2011, she started to play in women's doubles events with Wang Rong; they competed at the Macau Open Badminton Championships and reached the second round. In 2012, she won the Bitburger Open and became the semi-finalist of the Korea Masters tournaments in women's doubles event. At the 2012 Bitburger Open Grand Prix Gold they won the title after beat Johanna Goliszewski and Birgit Michels of Germany in straight games, 21–15, 21–13.

In 2013, she became the semi-finalist of the Canadian and Chinese Taipei Open tournaments in the women's doubles event with Wang Rong. At the 2013 Canada Open Grand Prix they were defeated by Eefje Muskens and Selena Piek of the Netherlands with the score 21–16, 21–10, and at the Chinese Taipei Grand Prix Gold they were defeated by Lee So-hee and Shin Seung-chan of Korea with the score 21–13, 18–21, 21–16.

== Achievements ==
=== East Asian Games ===
Women's doubles
Year	Venue	Partner	Opponent	Score	Result
2009	Queen Elizabeth Stadium, Hong Kong	(Macau) Zhang Dan	(China) Ma Jin (China) Wang Xiaoli	22–20, 21–16	Gold

=== BWF Superseries ===
The BWF Superseries, launched on 14 December 2006 and implemented in 2007, is a series of elite badminton tournaments, sanctioned by the Badminton World Federation (BWF). BWF Superseries has two level such as Superseries and Superseries Premier. A season of Superseries features twelve tournaments around the world, which introduced since 2011, with successful players invited to the Superseries Finals held at the year end.

Women's doubles
Year	Tournament	Partner	Opponent	Score	Result
2008	China Masters	(Macau) Zhang Dan	(China) Cheng Shu (China) Zhao Yunlei	14–21, 11–21	(silver) Runner-up

=== BWF Grand Prix ===
The BWF Grand Prix has two levels, the Grand Prix Gold and Grand Prix. It is a series of badminton tournaments, sanctioned by the Badminton World Federation (BWF) since 2007.

The World Badminton Grand Prix has been sanctioned by the International Badminton Federation since 1983.

Women's doubles
Year	Tournament	Partner	Opponent	Score	Result
2012	Bitburger Open	(Macau) Wang Rong	(Germany) Johanna Goliszewski (Germany) Birgit Michels	21–15, 21–13	(gold) Winner

BWF Grand Prix Gold tournament
BWF Grand Prix tournament
