= Wang Pei-rong =

Taiwanese badminton player (born 1985)

Wang Pei-rong 王沛蓉
Personal information
- Born: 17 January 1985 (age 41)
- Height: 1.66 m (5 ft 5 in)

Sport
- Country: Taiwan
- Sport: Badminton
- Handedness: Right

Women's & mixed doubles
- Highest ranking: 22 (WD) 26 May 2011; 17 (XD) 26 August 2010
- BWF profile
Medal record
Badminton
Representing Chinese Taipei
East Asian Games
Silver medal – second place	2013 Tianjin	Women's team
Silver medal – second place	2009 Hong Kong	Women's team
Bronze medal – third place	2013 Tianjin	Mixed doubles
Bronze medal – third place	2009 Hong Kong	Women's doubles
Summer Universiade
Bronze medal – third place	2013 Kazan	Mixed doubles
Bronze medal – third place	2013 Kazan	Mixed team
Bronze medal – third place	2011 Shenzhen	Women's doubles
Bronze medal – third place	2011 Shenzhen	Mixed team

Wang Pei-rong (Chinese: 王沛蓉; pinyin: Wáng Pèiróng; born 17 January 1985) is a Taiwanese badminton player. She competed at the 2010 and 2014 Asian Games.

== Career ==
In 2009, she won the women's doubles bronze at the East Asian Games, and at the same year she reach the semi-final round at the Hong Kong Open. In 2011, Wang won two bronze medals in the women's doubles and team event at the Shenzhen Universiade. In 2013, she won the women's team silver and mixed doubles bronze medal at the East Asian Games, and became the runner-up at the Osaka International Challenge tournament. Wang competed at the Kazan Universiade, and won two bronze medals in the mixed doubles and team event. In 2014, she was the semi-finalist at the U.S. Open Grand Prix Gold.

== Achievements ==
=== East Asian Games ===
Women's doubles
Year	Venue	Partner	Opponent	Score	Result
2009	Queen Elizabeth Stadium; Hong Kong	(Chinese Taipei) Chien Yu-chin	(China) Ma Jin (China) Wang Xiaoli	24–22, 15–21, 18–21	Bronze

Mixed doubles
Year	Venue	Partner	Opponent	Score	Result
2013	Binhai New Area Dagang Gymnasium; Tianjin, China	(Chinese Taipei) Lee Sheng-mu	(Hong Kong) Lee Chun Hei (Hong Kong) Chau Hoi Wah	12–21, 15–21	Bronze

=== Summer Universiade ===
Women's doubles
Year	Venue	Partner	Opponent	Score	Result
2011	Gymnasium of SZIIT; Shenzhen, China	(Chinese Taipei) Hsieh Pei-chen	(Chinese Taipei) Cheng Shao-chieh (Chinese Taipei) Pai Hsiao-ma	19–21, 21–18, 12–21	Bronze

Mixed doubles
Year	Venue	Partner	Opponent	Score	Result
2013	Tennis Academy; Kazan, Russia	(Chinese Taipei) Chen Hung-ling	(China) Liu Cheng (China) Tian Qing	15–21, 21–12, 17–21	Bronze

=== BWF International Challenge/Series ===
Mixed doubles
Year	Tournament	Partner	Opponent	Score	Result
2013	Osaka International	(Chinese Taipei) Lin Chia-yu	(Indonesia) Lukhi Apri Nugroho (Indonesia) Annisa Saufika	16–21, 19–21	(silver) Runner-up
2010	Vietnam International	(Chinese Taipei) Wang Chia-min	(Singapore) Hendri Kurniawan Saputra (Singapore) Yu Yan Vanessa Neo	21–23, 13–21	(silver) Runner-up

BWF International Challenge tournament
BWF International Series tournament
