= Sun Junjie =

Chinese badminton player

Sun Junjie 孙君杰
Personal information
- Born: 8 August 1985 (age 41) Jiangsu, China
- Height: 1.77 m (5 ft 10 in)

Sport
- Country: China
- Sport: Badminton
- Event: Men's & mixed doubles

Men's & mixed doubles
- BWF profile
Medal record
Men's badminton
Representing China
East Asian Games
| Gold medal – first place | 2009 Hong Kong | Men's team |
World Junior Championships
| Gold medal – first place | 2002 Pretoria | Mixed team |
| Bronze medal – third place | 2002 Pretoria | Boys' doubles |
Asian Junior Championships
| Bronze medal – third place | 2002 Kuala Lumpur | Boys' team |

Sun Junjie (Chinese: 孙君杰; born 8 August 1985) is a Chinese badminton player.

== Career ==
Sun Junjie came from the badminton family. His mother was a member of the Jiangsu provincial team, and his father Sun Zhian, was a Jiangsu coach. He started practicing badminton at the age of ten for losing his weight. In 2002, he entered the national second team, participated at the Asian and World Junior Championships, winning a boys' team bronze medal in Asia, boys' doubles bronze and mixed team gold at the World Junior Championships.

Sun entered the national first team in 2004. He was selected to join the Badminton Branch of Federation University Sports of China competed at the 2008 World University Badminton Championships held in Braga, Portugal, helped the team clinch the gold medal, also won the bronze medals in the men's and mixed doubles event.

He was part of the national team that won the men's team gold medal at the 2009 East Asian Games in Hong Kong, and also the 2009 Sudirman Cup in Guangzhou.

== Achievements ==
=== World Junior Championships ===
Boys' doubles
| Year | Venue | Partner | Opponent | Score | Result |
|---|---|---|---|---|---|
| 2002 | Pretoria Showgrounds; Pretoria, South Africa | (China) Cao Chen | (Malaysia) Jack Koh (Malaysia) Tan Bin Shen | 9–15, 11–15 | Bronze |

=== BWF Superseries ===
The BWF Superseries, launched on December 14, 2006 and implemented in 2007, is a series of elite badminton tournaments, sanctioned by Badminton World Federation (BWF). BWF Superseries has two level such as Superseries and Superseries Premier. A season of Superseries features twelve tournaments around the world, which introduced since 2011, with successful players invited to the Superseries Finals held at the year end.

Men's doubles
| Year | Tournament | Partner | Opponent | Score | Result |
|---|---|---|---|---|---|
| 2008 | China Masters | (China) Xu Chen | (Indonesia) Markis Kido (Indonesia) Hendra Setiawan | 17–21, 22–24 | (silver) Runner-up |

BWF Super Series Finals tournament
BWF Super Series Premier tournament
BWF Super Series tournament

=== IBF International ===
Mixed doubles
| Year | Tournament | Partner | Opponent | Score | Result |
|---|---|---|---|---|---|
| 2004 | Polish International | (China) Pan Pan | (Ukraine) Vladislav Druzchenko (Ukraine) Elena Nozdran | 11–15, 7–15 | (silver) Runner-up |
