= Salakjit Ponsana =

Thai badminton player

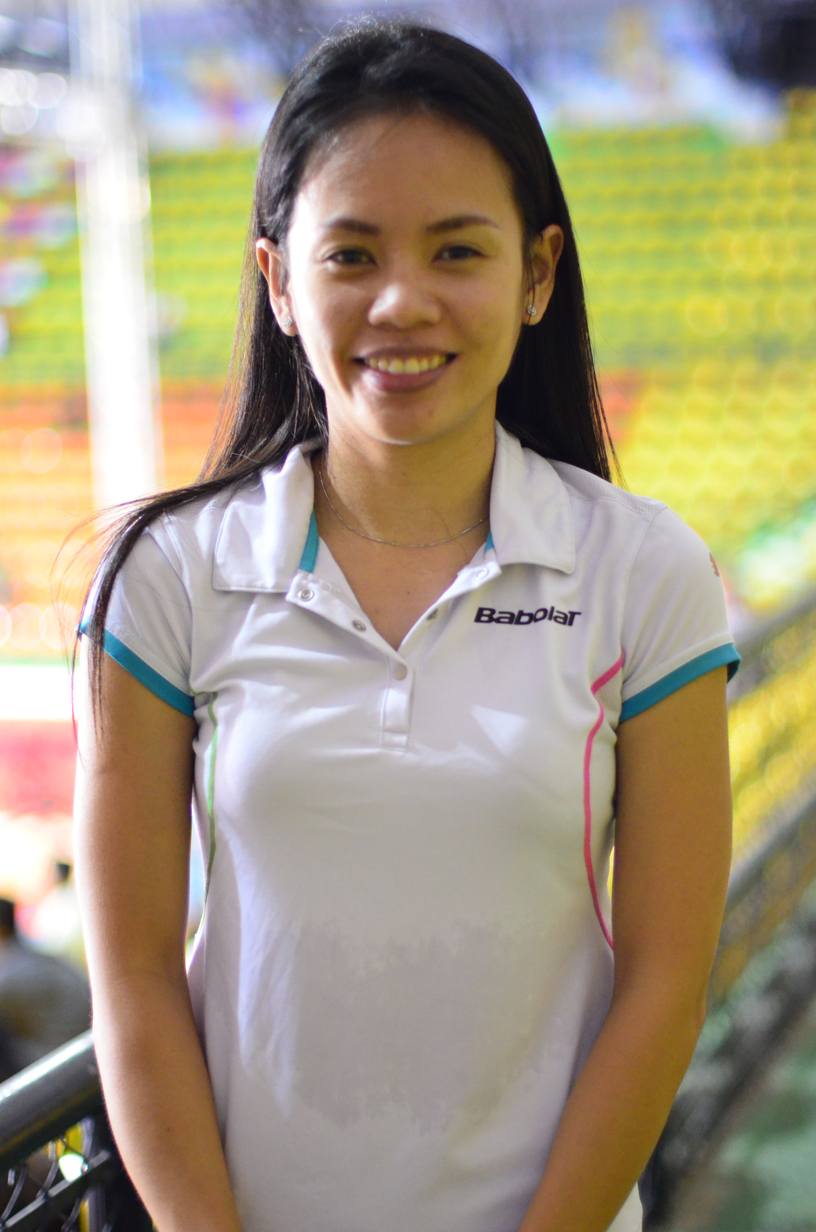

Personal information
- Born: 14 February 1984 (age 42) Bangkok, Thailand
- Height: 1.60 m (5 ft 3 in)
- Weight: 49 kg (108 lb)

Sport
- Country: Thailand
- Sport: Badminton
- Handedness: Right

Women's singles
- Highest ranking: 12 (19 November 2009)
- BWF profile
Medal record
Women's badminton
Representing Thailand
Asian Games
Silver medal – second place	2010 Guangzhou	Women's team
Bronze medal – third place	2002 Busan	Women's team
SEA Games
Gold medal – first place	2005 Manila	Women's team
Gold medal – first place	2009 Vientiane	Women's singles
Gold medal – first place	2011 Jakarta–Palembang	Women's team
Silver medal – second place	2001 Kuala Lumpur	Women's team
Silver medal – second place	2003 Vietnam	Women's singles
Silver medal – second place	2003 Vietnam	Women's team
Bronze medal – third place	2005 Manila	Women's singles
Bronze medal – third place	2007 Nakhon Ratchasima	Women's team
Bronze medal – third place	2009 Vientiane	Women's team
Summer Universiade
Gold medal – first place	2007 Bangkok	Mixed team
Bronze medal – third place	2007 Bangkok	Mixed doubles
Asian Junior Championships
Silver medal – second place	2002 Kuala Lumpur	Girls' doubles

Salakjit Ponsana (Thai: สลักจิต พลสนะ; RTGS: Salakchit Phonsana, born 14 February 1984) is a Thai retired badminton player. She competed in the women's singles event at the 2004 Athens and 2008 Beijing Olympics. Her brother, Boonsak Ponsana is also a Thai olympian.

== Career ==
Ponsana played badminton at the 2004 Summer Olympics, defeating Miho Tanaka of Japan in the first round but losing to Gong Ruina of China in the round of 16. In 2008, she was defeated in the second round by Zhang Ning of China with the score 23–21, 17–21, 7–21. Ponsana also competed at the Asian Games in 2002, 2006, and 2010, and won the 2010 women's team silver medal. At the SEA Games, she has collected 3 gold, 3 silver, and 3 bronze medals from 2001 to 2011. Ponsana graduated with a bachelor's degree in law from Sripatum University, and she is studying there to earn her master's in Management. She then represented her country and university to compete at the 2007 Universiade. At that games, she won a gold in team event and a bronze in mixed doubles event.

== Achievements ==
=== SEA Games ===
Women's singles
Year	Venue	Opponent	Score	Result
2003	Tan Binh Sport Center; Ho Chi Minh City, Vietnam	(Malaysia) Wong Mew Choo	5–11, 5–11	Silver
2005	PhilSports Arena; Metro Manila, Philippines	(Indonesia) Adriyanti Firdasari	6–11, 11–7, 12–13	Bronze
2009	Gym Hall 1, National Sports Complex; Vientiane, Laos	(Thailand) Ratchanok Intanon	21–14, 18–21, 21–10	Gold

=== Summer Universiade ===
Mixed doubles
Year	Venue	Partner	Opponent	Score	Result
2007	Thammasat University; Pathum Thani, Thailand	(Thailand) Sudket Prapakamol	(Chinese Taipei) Fang Chieh-min (Chinese Taipei) Cheng Wen-hsing	16–21, 18–21	Bronze

=== Asian Junior Championships ===
Girls' doubles
Year	Venue	Partner	Opponent	Score	Result
2002	Kuala Lumpur Badminton Stadium; Kuala Lumpur, Malaysia	(Thailand) Soratja Chansrisukot	(China) Du Jing (China) Rong Lu	4–11, 2–11	Silver

=== BWF International Challenge/Series/Asian Satellite ===
Women's singles
Year	Tournament	Opponent	Score	Result
2002	India Satellite	(India) Aparna Popat	11–7, 8–11, 11–5	(gold) Winner
2002	Smiling Fish Satellite	(China) Liu Zhen	6–8, 4–7, 2–7	(silver) Runner-up
2003	India Satellite	(India) Aparna Popat	4–11, 13–10, 4–11	(silver) Runner-up
2003	Smiling Fish Satellite	(Thailand) Soratja Chansrisukot	13–10, 11–3	(gold) Winner
2004	Cheers Asian Satellite	(Singapore) Li Li	11–6, 6–11, 9–11	(silver) Runner-up
2004	Vietnam Satellite	(Indonesia) Silvi Antarini	4–11, 11–7, 9–11	(silver) Runner-up
2004	Smiling Fish Satellite	(Thailand) Molthila Meemeak	11–4, 8–11, 11–5	(gold) Winner
2006	Vietnam Satellite	(South Korea) Jang Soo-young	15–21, 21–17, 19–21	(silver) Runner-up
2007	Smiling Fish International	(Thailand) Soratja Chansrisukot	12–21, 21–4, 21–14	(gold) Winner
2012	Spanish Open	(Spain) Beatriz Corrales	21–11, 13–21, 21–14	(gold) Winner
2013	Tahiti International	(France) Sashina Vignes Waran	16–21, 21–12, 21–19	(gold) Winner

Women's doubles
Year	Tournament	Partner	Opponent	Score	Result
2001	India Satellite	(Thailand) Nucharin Teekhatrakul	(India) Oli Deka (India) B. R. Meenakshi	15–4, 15–5	(gold) Winner
2002	India Satellite	(Thailand) Soratja Chansrisukot	(Thailand) Duanganong Aroonkesorn (Thailand) Kunchala Voravichitchaikul	1–11, 6–11	(silver) Runner-up
2002	Smiling Fish Satellite	(Thailand) Sathinee Chankrachangwong	(Thailand) Duanganong Aroonkesorn (Thailand) Kunchala Voravichitchaikul	7–1, 1–7, 6–8	(silver) Runner-up
2003	Smiling Fish Satellite	(Thailand) Duanganong Aroonkesorn	(Japan) Kumiko Ogura (Japan) Reiko Shiota		(gold) Winner

Mixed doubles
Year	Tournament	Partner	Opponent	Score	Result
2002	Vietnam Satellite	(Thailand) Sudket Prapakamol	(Vietnam) Trần Đức Sang (Vietnam) Nguyễn Hạnh Dung	15–6, 15–4	(gold) Winner
2013	Tahiti International	(Netherlands) Ruud Bosch	(France) Laurent Constantin (France) Teshana Vignes Waran	21–18, 21–15	(gold) Winner

BWF International Challenge tournament
BWF International Series tournament
