= Cheng Shu =

Chinese badminton player (born 1987)

Cheng Shu 成淑
Personal information
- Born: 11 July 1987 (age 39) Nantong, Jiangsu, China
- Height: 1.78 m (5 ft 10 in)
- Weight: 62 kg (137 lb)

Sport
- Country: China
- Sport: Badminton
- Handedness: Right

Women's doubles
- Highest ranking: 1 (12 November 2009)
- BWF profile
Medal record
Women's badminton
Representing China
World Championships
| Silver medal – second place | 2009 Hyderabad | Women's doubles |
| Bronze medal – third place | 2010 Paris | Women's doubles |
Uber Cup
| Gold medal – first place | 2012 Wuhan | Women's team |
Asian Games
| Gold medal – first place | 2010 Guangzhou | Women's team |
Asian Championships
| Silver medal – second place | 2007 Johor Bahru | Women's doubles |
| Bronze medal – third place | 2012 Qingdao | Women's doubles |
East Asian Games
| Gold medal – first place | 2009 Hong Kong | Women's team |
| Bronze medal – third place | 2009 Hong Kong | Women's doubles |
Asian Junior Championships
| Gold medal – first place | 2005 Jakarta | Girls' doubles |
| Gold medal – first place | 2005 Jakarta | Girls' team |

Cheng Shu (Chinese: 成淑; born 11 July 1987) is a Chinese badminton doubles player.

== Achievements ==
=== BWF World Championships ===
Women's doubles
| Year | Venue | Partner | Opponent | Score | Result |
|---|---|---|---|---|---|
| 2009 | Gachibowli Indoor Stadium, Hyderabad, India | (China) Zhao Yunlei | (China) Zhang Yawen (China) Zhao Tingting | 21–17, 17–21, 16–21 | Silver |
| 2010 | Stade Pierre de Coubertin, Paris, France | (China) Zhao Yunlei | (China) Ma Jin (China) Wang Xiaoli | 21–10, 10–21, 13–21 | Bronze |

=== Asian Championships ===
Women's doubles
| Year | Venue | Partner | Opponent | Score | Result |
|---|---|---|---|---|---|
| 2007 | Stadium Bandaraya, Johor Bahru, Malaysia | (China) Zhao Yunlei | (China) Yang Wei (China) Zhao Tingting | 10–21, 11–21 | Silver |
| 2012 | Qingdao Sports Centre Conson Stadium, Qingdao, China | (China) Pan Pan | (China) Tian Qing (China) Zhao Yunlei | Walkover | Bronze |

=== East Asian Games ===
Women's doubles
| Year | Venue | Partner | Opponent | Score | Result |
|---|---|---|---|---|---|
| 2009 | Queen Elizabeth Stadium, Hong Kong | (China) Zhao Yunlei | (Macau) Zhang Dan (Macau) Zhang Zhibo | 13–21, 10–21 | Bronze |

=== Asian Junior Championships ===
Girls' doubles
| Year | Venue | Partner | Opponent | Score | Result |
|---|---|---|---|---|---|
| 2005 | Tennis Indoor Senayan, Jakarta, Indonesia | (China) Liao Jingmei | (South Korea) Ha Jung-eun (South Korea) Hong Soo-jung | 11–15, 15–12, 15–5 | Gold |

=== BWF Superseries ===
The BWF Superseries, launched on 14 December 2006 and implemented in 2007, was a series of elite badminton tournaments, sanctioned by the Badminton World Federation (BWF). BWF Superseries had two levels: Superseries and Superseries Premier. A season of Superseries features twelve tournaments around the world, introduced in 2007, with successful players invited to the BWF Superseries Finals held at the year's end.

Women's doubles
| Year | Tournament | Partner | Opponent | Score | Result |
|---|---|---|---|---|---|
| 2008 | Japan Open | (China) Zhao Yunlei | (Malaysia) Chin Eei Hui (Malaysia) Wong Pei Tty | 21–19, 15–21, 21–18 | (gold) Winner |
| 2008 | China Masters | (China) Zhao Yunlei | (Macau) Zhang Dan (Macau) Zhang Zhibo | 21–14, 21–11 | (gold) Winner |
| 2008 | Hong Kong Open | (China) Zhao Yunlei | (China) Zhang Yawen (China) Zhao Tingting | 14–21, 13–21 | (silver) Runner-up |
| 2009 | All England Open | (China) Zhao Yunlei | (China) Zhang Yawen (China) Zhao Tingting | 13–21, 15–21 | (silver) Runner-up |
| 2009 | Indonesia Open | (China) Zhao Yunlei | (Malaysia) Chin Eei Hui (Malaysia) Wong Pei Tty | 16–21, 16–21 | (silver) Runner-up |
| 2009 | China Masters | (China) Zhao Yunlei | (China) Du Jing (China) Yu Yang | 15–21, 15–21 | (silver) Runner-up |
| 2009 | French Open | (China) Zhao Yunlei | (China) Ma Jin (China) Wang Xiaoli | 13–21, 8–21 | (silver) Runner-up |
| 2010 | Korea Open | (China) Zhao Yunlei | (Japan) Mizuki Fujii (Japan) Reika Kakiiwa | 21–16, 21–15 | (gold) Winner |
| 2010 | All England Open | (China) Zhao Yunlei | (China) Du Jing (China) Yu Yang | 22–20, 16–21, 13–21 | (silver) Runner-up |
| 2010 | Japan Open | (China) Zhao Yunlei | (China) Wang Xiaoli (China) Yu Yang | 17–21, 6–21 | (silver) Runner-up |
| 2010 | China Open | (China) Zhao Yunlei | (China) Ma Jin (China) Zhong Qianxin | Walkover | (gold) Winner |
| 2010 | Superseries Finals | (China) Zhao Yunlei | (China) Wang Xiaoli (China) Yu Yang | 7–21, 17–21 | (silver) Runner-up |
| 2012 | China Masters | (China) Luo Yu | (China) Bao Yixin (China) Zhong Qianxin | 12–21, 15–21 | (silver) Runner-up |
| 2013 | All England Open | (China) Zhao Yunlei | (China) Wang Xiaoli (China) Yu Yang | 18–21, 10–21 | (silver) Runner-up |
| 2013 | Indonesia Open | (China) Bao Yixin | (China) Wang Xiaoli (China) Yu Yang | 15–21, 21–18, 21–18 | (gold) Winner |

BWF Super Series Finals tournament
BWF Super Series Premier tournament
BWF Super Series tournament

=== BWF Grand Prix ===
The BWF Grand Prix has two levels: Grand Prix and Grand Prix Gold. It is a series of badminton tournaments, sanctioned by Badminton World Federation (BWF) since 2007.

Women's doubles
| Year | Tournament | Partner | Opponent | Score | Result |
|---|---|---|---|---|---|
| 2008 | Macau Open | (China) Zhao Yunlei | (China) Ma Jin (China) Wang Xiaoli | 21–15, 21–18 | (gold) Winner |
| 2009 | German Open | (China) Zhao Yunlei | (China) Pan Pan (China) Tian Qing | 18–21, 21–13, 21–16 | (gold) Winner |
| 2010 | German Open | (China) Zhao Yunlei | (China) Ma Jin (China) Wang Xiaoli | 22–24, 15–21 | (silver) Runner-up |
| 2011 | Thailand Open | (China) Bao Yixin | (China) Tian Qing (China) Zhao Yunlei | 7–21, 8–21 | (silver) Runner-up |
| 2011 | Canada Open | (China) Bao Yixin | (Chinese Taipei) Cheng Wen-hsing (Chinese Taipei) Chien Yu-chin | 21–13, 23–21 | (gold) Winner |
| 2012 | Thailand Open | (China) Pan Pan | (Thailand) Narissapat Lam (Thailand) Saralee Thoungthongkam | 15–21, 21–10, 13–21 | (silver) Runner-up |

BWF Grand Prix Gold tournament
BWF Grand Prix tournament

=== BWF International Challenge/Series ===
Women's doubles
| Year | Tournament | Partner | Opponent | Score | Result |
|---|---|---|---|---|---|
| 2007 | Austrian International | (China) Zhao Yunlei | (China) Pan Pan (China) Tian Qing | 21–18, 21–13 | (gold) Winner |

BWF International Challenge tournament
BWF International Series tournament
