= Du Jing =

Badminton player (born 1984)

Du Jing 杜婧
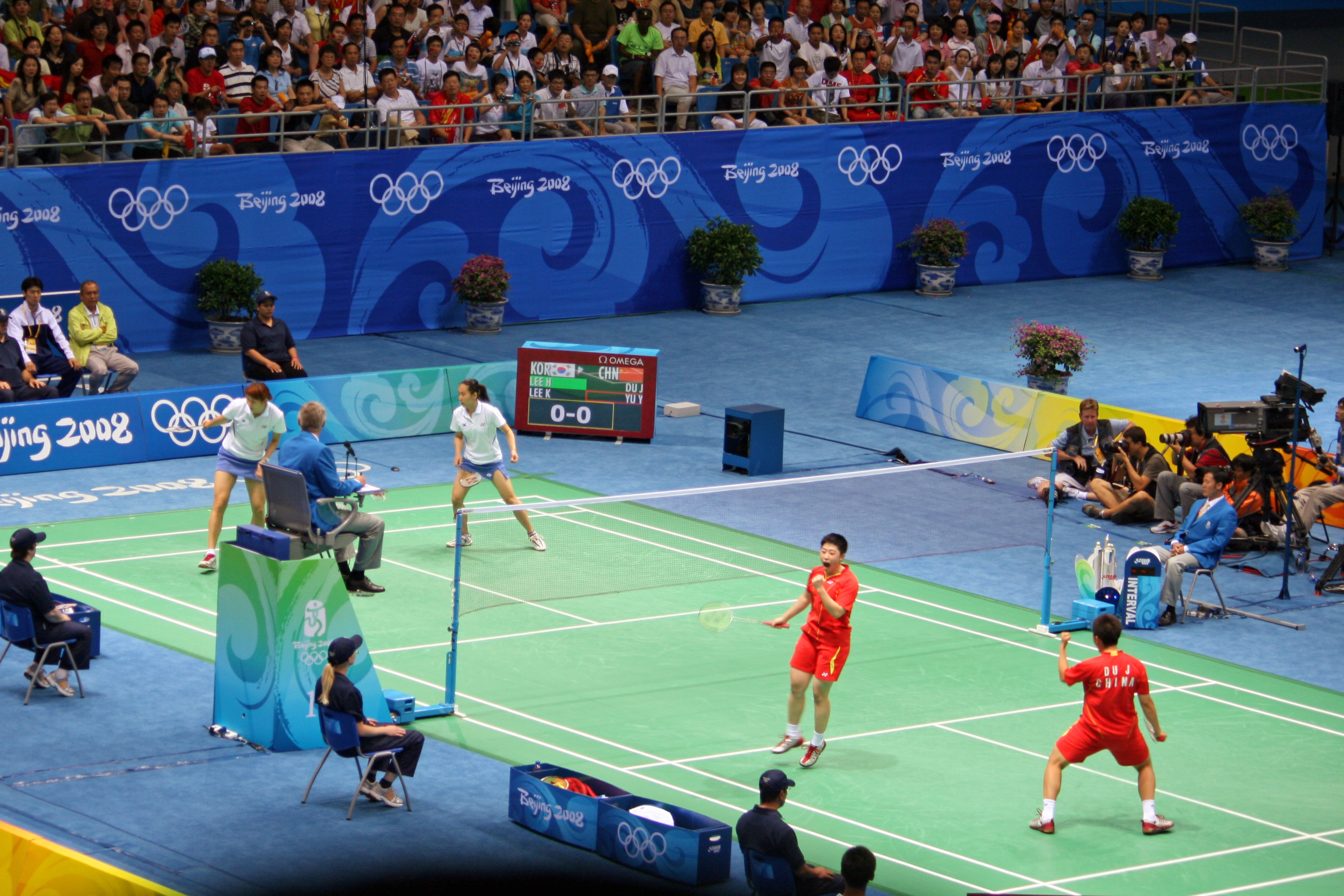

Personal information
- Born: 23 June 1984 (age 42) Anshan, Liaoning, China
- Height: 1.70 m (5 ft 7 in)
- Weight: 70 kg (154 lb)

Sport
- Country: China
- Sport: Badminton
- Handedness: Right

Women's doubles
- Highest ranking: 1 (18 March 2010)
- BWF profile
Medal record
Women's badminton
Representing China
Olympic Games
Gold medal – first place	2008 Beijing	Women's doubles
World Championships
Gold medal – first place	2010 Paris	Women's doubles
Bronze medal – third place	2009 Hyderabad	Women's doubles
Bronze medal – third place	2006 Madrid	Women's doubles
Sudirman Cup
Gold medal – first place	2009 Guangzhou	Mixed team
Uber Cup
Gold medal – first place	2006 Sendai & Tokyo	Women's team
Silver medal – second place	2010 Kuala Lumpur	Women's team
Asian Championships
Gold medal – first place	2006 Johor Bahru	Women's doubles
Silver medal – second place	2004 Kuala Lumpur	Women's doubles
World Junior Championships
Gold medal – first place	2002 Pretoria	Girls' doubles
Gold medal – first place	2002 Pretoria	Mixed team
Asian Junior Championships
Gold medal – first place	2002 Kuala Lumpur	Girls' doubles
Gold medal – first place	2002 Kuala Lumpur	Girls' team

Du Jing (Chinese: 杜婧; pinyin: Dù Jìng; born 23 June 1984) is a former Chinese badminton player from Anshan, Liaoning.

== Career ==
A doubles specialist, Du and her regular partner Yu Yang have steadily emerged as one of the world's elite women's doubles teams since 2004. They confirmed this status by winning the gold medal at the 2008 Olympics in Beijing over South Korea's Lee Kyung-won and Lee Hyo-jung. Their other titles have included the Polish Open (2004); the China Masters (2005); the Asian Championships and Swiss Open in 2006; the Russian, Hong Kong, and Indonesia Opens in 2007; and the French, Korea, and Singapore Opens in 2008. Du and Yu were bronze medalists at the World Championships in 2006, but were unable to play in the tourney's 2007 edition. They were runners-up at the prestigious All-England Championships in 2008, but avenged that loss by beating their All-England conquerors in the Olympic final.

== Achievements ==
=== Olympic Games ===
Women's doubles
Year	Venue	Partner	Opponent	Score	Result
2008	Beijing University of Technology Gymnasium; Beijing, China	(China) Yu Yang	(South Korea) Lee Hyo-jung (South Korea) Lee Kyung-won	21–15, 21–13	Gold

=== BWF World Championships ===
Women's doubles
Year	Venue	Partner	Opponent	Score	Result
2010	Stade Pierre de Coubertin, Paris, France	(China) Yu Yang	(China) Ma Jin (China) Wang Xiaoli	21–9, 21–17	Gold
2009	Gachibowli Indoor Stadium, Hyderabad, India	(China) Yu Yang	(China) Zhang Yawen (China) Zhao Tingting	22–24, 21–18, 8–21	Bronze
2006	Palacio de Deportes de la Comunidad, Madrid, Spain	(China) Yu Yang	(China) Gao Ling (China) Huang Sui	21–18, 20–22, 17–21	Bronze

=== Asian Championships ===
Women's doubles
Year	Venue	Partner	Opponent	Score	Result
2006	Bandaraya Stadium, Johor Bahru, Malaysia	(China) Yu Yang	(Chinese Taipei) Chien Yu-chin (Chinese Taipei) Cheng Wen-Hsing	21–11, 21–16	Gold
2004	Kuala Lumpur Badminton Stadium, Kuala Lumpur, Malaysia	(China) Yu Yang	(South Korea) Lee Hyo-jung (South Korea) Lee Kyung-won	15–6, 11–15, 7–15	Silver

=== World Junior Championships ===
Girls' doubles
Year	Venue	Partner	Opponent	Score	Result
2002	Pretoria Showgrounds, Pretoria, South Africa	(China) Rong Lu	(China) Yu Yang (China) Chen Lanting	11–6, 11–7	Gold

=== Asian Junior Championships ===
Girls' doubles
Year	Venue	Partner	Opponent	Score	Result
2002	Kuala Lumpur Badminton Stadium, Kuala Lumpur, Malaysia	(China) Rong Lu	(Thailand) Soratja Chansrisukot (Thailand) Salakjit Ponsana	11–4, 11–2	Gold

=== BWF Superseries ===
The BWF Superseries has two level such as Superseries and Superseries Premier. A season of Superseries features twelve tournaments around the world, which introduced since 2011, with successful players invited to the Superseries Finals held at the year end.

Women's doubles
Year	Tournament	Partner	Opponent	Score	Result
2010	All England Open	(China) Yu Yang	(China) Cheng Shu (China) Zhao Yunlei	20–22, 21–16, 21–13	(gold) Winner
2010	Malaysia Open	(China) Yu Yang	(China) Ma Jin (China) Wang Xiaoli	21–16, 21–12	(gold) Winner
2009	China Open	(China) Yu Yang	(China) Tian Qing (China) Zhang Yawen	14–21, 14–21	(silver) Runner-up
2009	Hong Kong Open	(China) Yu Yang	(China) Ma Jin (China) Wang Xiaoli	21–16, 19–21, 12–21	(silver) Runner-up
2009	China Masters	(China) Yu Yang	(China) Cheng Shu (China) Zhao Yunlei	21–15, 21–15	(gold) Winner
2009	Swiss Open	(China) Yu Yang	(South Korea) Lee Hyo-jung (South Korea) Lee Kyung-won	21–11, 21–12	(gold) Winner
2008	French Open	(China) Yu Yang	(Malaysia) Chin Eei Hui (Malaysia) Wong Pei Tty	20–22, 21–19, 21–11	(gold) Winner
2008	Singapore Open	(China) Yu Yang	(Chinese Taipei) Chien Yu-chin (Chinese Taipei) Cheng Wen-hsing	21–16, 21–19	(gold) Winner
2008	All England Open	(China) Yu Yang	(South Korea) Lee Kyung-won (South Korea) Lee Hyo-jung	21–12, 18–21, 14–21	(silver) Runner-up
2008	Korea Open	(China) Yu Yang	(China) Gao Ling (China) Zhao Tingting	21–15, 21–13	(gold) Winner
2007	Hong Kong Open	(China) Yu Yang	(China) Wei Yili (China) Zhang Yawen	22–20, 13–21, 21–17	(gold) Winner
2007	China Open	(China) Yu Yang	(China) Gao Ling (China) Zhao Tingting	21–17, 15–21, 8–21	(silver) Runner-up
2007	Indonesia Open	(China) Yu Yang	(China) Zhao Tingting (China) Yang Wei	21–8, 16–21, 22–20	(gold) Winner

BWF Super Series Finals tournament
BWF Super Series Premier tournament
BWF Super Series tournament

=== BWF Grand Prix ===
The BWF Grand Prix has two levels, the Grand Prix Gold and Grand Prix. It is a series of badminton tournaments, sanctioned by the Badminton World Federation (BWF) since 2007. The World Badminton Grand Prix has been sanctioned by the International Badminton Federation since 1983.

Women's doubles
Year	Tournament	Partner	Opponent	Score	Result
2009	Macau Open	(China) Yu Yang	(China) Yang Wei (China) Zhang Jiewen	21–16, 21–11	(gold) Winner
2007	Russian Open	(China) Yu Yang	(Chinese Taipei) Chien Yu-chin (Chinese Taipei) Cheng Wen-hsing	21–14, 21–14	(gold) Winner
2007	Thailand Open	(China) Yu Yang	(China) Gao Ling (China) Huang Sui	Walkover	(silver) Runner-up
2007	German Open	(China) Yu Yang	(China) Yang Wei (China) Zhang Jiewen	8–21, 7–21	(silver) Runner-up
2006	Swiss Open	(China) Yu Yang	(China) Zhang Dan (China) Zhao Tingting	15–5, 10–15, 15–11	(gold) Winner
2005	China Masters	(China) Yu Yang	(China) Gao Ling (China) Huang Sui	15–4, 17–14	(gold) Winner
2004	Thailand Open	(China) Yu Yang	(China) Zhang Dan (China) Zhang Yawen	5–15, 7–15	(silver) Runner-up

BWF Grand Prix Gold tournament
BWF Grand Prix tournament

=== IBF International ===
Women's doubles
Year	Tournament	Partner	Opponent	Score	Result
2004	Polish International	(China) Yu Yang	(China) Feng Chen (China) Pan Pan	15–5, 15–6	(gold) Winner
2004	French International	(China) Yu Yang	(China) Feng Chen (China) Pan Pan	5–15, 15–4, 15–6	(gold) Winner
