= 2011 Malaysia Super Series =

Tournament details
- Dates: 18–23 January
- Edition: 56th
- Total prize money: US$400,000
- Venue: Putra Indoor Stadium
- Location: Kuala Lumpur, Malaysia

Champions
- Men's singles: (Malaysia) Lee Chong Wei
- Women's singles: (China) Wang Shixian
- Men's doubles: (China) Chai Biao (China) Guo Zhendong
- Women's doubles: (China) Tian Qing (China) Zhao Yunlei
- Mixed doubles: (China) He Hanbin (China) Ma Jin

The 2011 Malaysia Super Series was the first tournament of the 2011 BWF Super Series in badminton. It was held in Kuala Lumpur, Malaysia from 18 to 23 January 2011.

== Men's singles ==
=== Seeds ===
1. (Malaysia) Lee Chong Wei (champion)
2. (Indonesia) Taufik Hidayat (final)
3. (China) Chen Long (semi-finals)
4. (China) Chen Jin (second round)
5. (China) Lin Dan (quarter-finals)
6. (Thailand) Boonsak Ponsana (second round)
7. (China) Bao Chunlai (first round)
8. (Vietnam) Nguyễn Tiến Minh (quarter-finals)

=== Top half ===
First Round
1	(Malaysia) Lee C W	21	21
Q2	(Indonesia) T Sugiarto	17	18
PFQ	(France) B Leverdez	21	17	19
(Hong Kong) Hu Y	15	21	21
8	(Vietnam) Nguyễn T M	21	25
(Japan) S Sasaki	10	23
(Japan) K Yamada	21	21
(India) C Anand	14	17
3	(China) Chen L	21	21
(Malaysia) M H Hashim	14	16
(Germany) M Zwiebler	21	15	21
(Malaysia) Wong C H	15	21	18
5	(China) Lin D	21	21
Q3	(China) Wang ZM	18	16
Q4	(South Korea) Lee H-i	21	21
(England) R Ouseph	15	12

Second Round
1	(Malaysia) Lee C W	21	21
(Hong Kong) Hu Y	6	9
8	(Vietnam) Nguyễn T M	21	21
(Japan) K Yamada	18	18
3	(China) Chen L	21	21
(Germany) M Zwiebler	12	4
5	(China) Lin D	21	21
Q4	(South Korea) Lee H-i	15	8

Quarterfinals
1	(Malaysia) Lee C W	21	21
8	(Vietnam) Nguyễn T M	15	16
3	(China) Chen L	w	/	o
5	(China) Lin D

Semifinals
1	(Malaysia) Lee C W	21	21
3	(China) Chen L	9	9

=== Bottom half ===
First Round
(England) C Baxter	15	6^{r}
PFQ	(Indonesia) A Yunus	21	11
Q1	(India) A Pawar	17	21
6	(Thailand) B Ponsana	21	23
(China) Du PY	21	6	5
(Indonesia) S Santoso	19	21	21
(Denmark) H Vittinghus	23	16	17
4	(China) Chen J	21	21	21
(Thailand) T Saensomboonsuk	16	21	14
(Netherlands) D Palyama	21	17	21
(Japan) K Tago	22	24
7	(China) Bao CL	20	22
(South Korea) Son W-h	21	13	21
(Indonesia) D H Rumbaka	14	21	17
(South Korea) Park S-h	21	9	6
2	(Indonesia) T Hidayat	17	21	21

Second Round
PFQ	(Indonesia) A Yunus	20	21	21
6	(Thailand) B Ponsana	22	10	18
(Indonesia) S Santoso	21	18	21
4	(China) Chen J	12	21	10
(Netherlands) D Palyama	21	6	15
(Japan) K Tago	14	21	21
(South Korea) Son W-h	13	11
2	(Indonesia) T Hidayat	21	21

Quarterfinals
PFQ	(Indonesia) A Yunus	19	9
(Indonesia) S Santoso	21	21
(Japan) K Tago	15	15
2	(Indonesia) T Hidayat	21	21

Semifinals
(Indonesia) S Santoso	15	19
2	(Indonesia) T Hidayat	21	21

=== Finals ===
Semifinals
1	(Malaysia) Lee Chong Wei	21	21
3	(China) Chen Long	9	9
(Indonesia) Simon Santoso	15	19
2	(Indonesia) Taufik Hidayat	21	21

Final
1	(Malaysia) Lee Chong Wei	21	21
2	(Indonesia) Taufik Hidayat	8	17

== Women's singles ==
=== Seeds ===
1. (China) Wang Xin (semi-finals)
2. (China) Wang Shixian (champion)
3. (China) Wang Yihan (final)
4. (China) Jiang Yanjiao (semi-finals)
5. (Germany) Juliane Schenk (quarter-finals)
6. (South Korea) Bae Yeon-ju (first round)
7. (Hong Kong) Yip Pui Yin (second round)
8. (China) Li Xuerui (second round)

=== Top half ===
First Round
1	(China) Wang X	21	21
(Bulgaria) L Zetchiri	16	11
(China) Lu L	21	20	12
(Malaysia) Wong M C	13	22	21
5	(Germany) J Schenk	25	21
Q3	(Malaysia) Tee J Y	23	13
(Japan) S Sato	6	15
(South Korea) Sung J-h	21	21
3	(China) Wang YH	21	21
(Thailand) R Intanon	13	18
Q4	(Chinese Taipei) Pai H-m	21	21
(Indonesia) M F Kusumastuti	18	18
7	(Hong Kong) Yip P Y	21	21
PFQ	(Indonesia) A Yuswandari	19	14
(Indonesia) L Fanetri	21	21
(Hong Kong) Chan T K	13	14

Second Round
1	(China) Wang X	21	17	21
(Malaysia) Wong M C	16	21	9
5	(Germany) J Schenk	21	19	21
(South Korea) Sung J-h	17	21	11
3	(China) Wang YH	21	21
Q4	(Chinese Taipei) Pai H-m	6	12
7	(Hong Kong) Yip P Y	23	5
(Indonesia) L Fanetri	25	21

Quarterfinals
1	(China) Wang X	21	21
5	(Germany) J Schenk	17	20
3	(China) Wang YH	21	21
(Indonesia) L Fanetri	9	19

Semifinals
1	(China) Wang X	18	18
3	(China) Wang YH	21	21

=== Bottom half ===
First Round
(Switzerland) J Cicognini	11	15
(Japan) A Goto	21	21
(China) Liu X	21	20	21
6	(South Korea) Bae Y-j	15	22	10
Q2	(Japan) A Kurihara	21	11	13
PFQ	(Singapore) Fu MT	10	21	21
(Bulgaria) P Nedelcheva	13	9
4	(China) Jiang YJ	21	21
(Netherlands) Yao J	19	12
(Chinese Taipei) Cheng S-c	21	21
(Singapore) Gu J	12	19
8	(China) Li XR	21	21
Q1	(Malaysia) L Cheah	21	19	24
(Chinese Taipei) Tai T-y	17	21	26
(Thailand) S Ponsana	17	8
2	(China) Wang SX	21	21

Second Round
(Japan) A Goto	12	11
(China) Liu X	21	21
PFQ	(Singapore) Fu MT	12	21	10
4	(China) Jiang YJ	21	17	21
(Chinese Taipei) Cheng S-c	21	15	21
8	(China) Li XR	14	21	11
(Chinese Taipei) Tai T-y	17	17
2	(China) Wang SX	21	21

Quarterfinals
(China) Liu X
4	(China) Jiang YJ	w	/	o
(Chinese Taipei) Cheng S-c	21	17	9
2	(China) Wang SX	19	21	21

Semifinals
4	(China) Jiang YJ	19	17
2	(China) Wang SX	21	21

=== Finals ===
Semifinals
1	(China) Wang Xin	18	18
3	(China) Wang Yihan	21	21
4	(China) Jiang Yanjiao	19	17
2	(China) Wang Shixian	21	21

Final
3	(China) Wang Yihan	18	14
2	(China) Wang Shixian	21	21

== Men's doubles ==
=== Seeds ===
1. (Malaysia) Koo Kien Keat / Tan Boon Heong (first round)
2. (South Korea) Ko Sung-hyun / Yoo Yeon-seong (quarter-finals)
3. (Indonesia) Alvent Yulianto / Hendra Aprida Gunawan (quarter-finals)
4. (Japan) Hirokatsu Hashimoto / Noriyasu Hirata (second round)
5. (China) Chai Biao / Guo Zhendong (champions)
6. (Indonesia) Mohammad Ahsan / Bona Septano (semi-finals)
7. (United States) Howard Bach / Tony Gunawan (second round)
8. (Chinese Taipei) Chen Hung-ling / Lin Yu-lang (first round)

=== Top half ===
First Round
1	(Malaysia) Koo K K (Malaysia) Tan B H	21	18	16
(China) Hong W (China) Shen Y	16	21	21
(Japan) N Kawamae (Japan) S Satō	21	21
(Malaysia) Gan T C (Malaysia) Tan B S	19	12
8	(Chinese Taipei) Chen H-l (Chinese Taipei) Lin Y-l	16	21	13
Q2	(Singapore) H Saputra (Singapore) C Triyachart	21	13	21
(Malaysia) M Z A Latif (Malaysia) Hoon T H	22	19	21
Q4	(Scotland) R Blair (Indonesia) F Limpele	20	21	16
3	(Indonesia) A Yulianto (Indonesia) H A Gunawan	21	21
(Japan) Y Hirobe (Japan) K Kazuno	15	15
(Germany) I Kindervater (Germany) J Schöttler	21	21
(Thailand) S Anugritayawon (Thailand) S Prapakamol	15	14
7	(United States) H Bach (United States) T Gunawan	21	21
Q1	(Thailand) P Chalardchaleam (Thailand) N Phuangphuapet	12	17
(Indonesia) A Pratama (Indonesia) R A Saputro	10	11
(Denmark) M Conrad-Petersen (Denmark) J Rasmussen	21	21

Second Round
(China) Hong W (China) Shen Y	16	16
(Japan) N Kawamae (Japan) S Satō	21	21
Q2	(Singapore) H Saputra (Singapore) C Triyachart	16	15
(Malaysia) M Z A Latif (Malaysia) Hoon T H	21	21
3	(Indonesia) A Yulianto (Indonesia) H A Gunawan	21	21
(Germany) I Kindervater (Germany) J Schöttler	9	11
7	(United States) H Bach (United States) T Gunawan	17	21	11
(Denmark) M Conrad-Petersen (Denmark) J Rasmussen	21	16	21

Quarterfinals
(Japan) N Kawamae (Japan) S Satō	21	21
(Malaysia) M Z A Latif (Malaysia) Hoon T H	15	19
3	(Indonesia) A Yulianto (Indonesia) H A Gunawan	16	19
(Denmark) M Conrad-Petersen (Denmark) J Rasmussen	21	21

Semifinals
(Japan) N Kawamae (Japan) S Satō	17	20
(Denmark) M Conrad-Petersen (Denmark) J Rasmussen	21	22

=== Bottom half ===
First Round
PFQ	(Indonesia) Y R Sugiarto (Indonesia) A Y Wirawan	21	16	21
(Indonesia) L Hadiyanto (Indonesia) C Wijaya	17	21	18
(Japan) H Endo (Japan) K Hayakawa	19	19
6	(Indonesia) M Ahsan (Indonesia) B Septano	21	21
(South Korea) Cho G-w (South Korea) Kwon Y-g	21	24
(Malaysia) Chan C M (Malaysia) Lee W W	19	22
Q3	(Malaysia) A K M L Zaid (Malaysia) M V Indra	15	16
4	(Japan) H Hashimoto (Japan) N Hirata	21	21
(Malaysia) M F M Tazari (Malaysia) Ong S H	w	/	o
(England) C Adcock (England) A Ellis
(Germany) M Fuchs (Germany) O Roth	14	9
5	(China) Chai B (China) Guo ZD	21	21
(China) Liu XL (China) Qiu ZH	15	21	22
(Singapore) D B Chrisnanta (Singapore) H Wijaya	21	14	20
(Netherlands) R Bosch (Netherlands) K Ridder
2	(South Korea) Ko S-h (South Korea) Yoo Y-s	w	/	o

Second Round
PFQ	(Indonesia) Y R Sugiarto (Indonesia) A Y Wirawan	16	19
6	(Indonesia) M Ahsan (Indonesia) B Septano	21	21
(South Korea) Cho G-w (South Korea) Kwon Y-g	21	21
4	(Japan) H Hashimoto (Japan) N Hirata	19	14
(Malaysia) M F M Tazari (Malaysia) Ong S H	11	20
5	(China) Chai B (China) Guo ZD	21	22
(China) Liu XL (China) Qiu ZH	16	9
2	(South Korea) Ko S-h (South Korea) Yoo Y-s	21	21

Quarterfinals
6	(Indonesia) M Ahsan (Indonesia) B Septano	21	21
(South Korea) Cho G-w (South Korea) Kwon Y-g	17	15
5	(China) Chai B (China) Guo ZD	23	21
2	(South Korea) Ko S-h (South Korea) Yoo Y-s	21	18

Semifinals
6	(Indonesia) M Ahsan (Indonesia) B Septano	15	14
5	(China) Chai B (China) Guo ZD	21	21

=== Finals ===
Semifinals
(Japan) Naoki Kawamae (Japan) Shōji Satō	17	20
(Denmark) Mads Conrad-Petersen (Denmark) Jonas Rasmussen	21	22
6	(Indonesia) Mohammad Ahsan (Indonesia) Bona Septano	15	14
5	(China) Chai Biao (China) Guo Zhendong	21	21

Final
(Denmark) Mads Conrad-Petersen (Denmark) Jonas Rasmussen	16	14
5	(China) Chai Biao (China) Guo Zhendong	21	21

== Women's doubles ==
=== Seeds ===
1. (Chinese Taipei) Cheng Wen-hsing / Chien Yu-chin (quarter-finals)
2. (Bulgaria) Petya Nedelcheva / (Russia) Anastasia Russkikh (quarter-finals)
3. (Thailand) Duanganong Aroonkesorn / Kunchala Voravichitchaikul (first round)
4. (Indonesia) Meiliana Jauhari / Greysia Polii (withdrew)
5. (China) Du Jing / Pan Pan (semi-finals)
6. (China) Wang Xiaoli / Yu Yang (final)
7. (China) Cheng Shu / Ma Jin (semi-finals)
8. (China) Tian Qing / Zhao Yunlei (champions)

=== Top half ===
First Round
1	(Chinese Taipei) Cheng W-h (Chinese Taipei) Chien Y-c	21	21
(Japan) S Matsuo (Japan) M Naito	15	13
(Indonesia) V Marissa (Indonesia) N Melati	21	29	20
(South Korea) Eom H-w (South Korea) Kim H-n	17	30	22
5	(China) Du J (China) Pan P	21	16	21
(India) J Gutta (India) A Ponnappa	11	21	5
(South Korea) Chang Y-n (South Korea) Kim M-s	15	21	12
(Indonesia) L Nurlita (Thailand) S Thungthongkam	21	19	21
PFQ	(Chinese Taipei) Chang H-y (Chinese Taipei) Cheng S-c	17	18
(Singapore) S M Sari (Singapore) Yao L	21	21
(Malaysia) Ng M P L (Malaysia) Woon K W	21	21
(Hong Kong) Chan T K (Hong Kong) Chau H W	14	17
8	(China) Tian Q (China) Zhao YL	21	21
(Indonesia) A F Agustin (Indonesia) N K Maheswari	15	5
(Germany) S Marinello (Germany) B Michels	17	21	21
(Hong Kong) Poon L Y (Hong Kong) Tse Y S	21	12	17

Second Round
1	(Chinese Taipei) Cheng W-h (Chinese Taipei) Chien Y-c	22	21	22
(South Korea) Eom H-w (South Korea) Kim H-n	24	19	20
5	(China) Du J (China) Pan P	15	21	21
(Indonesia) L Nurlita (Thailand) S Thungthongkam	21	14	14
(Singapore) S M Sari (Singapore) Yao L	21	21
(Malaysia) Ng M P L (Malaysia) Woon K W	17	15
8	(China) Tian Q (China) Zhao YL	21	21
(Germany) S Marinello (Germany) B Michels	14	15

Quarterfinals
1	(Chinese Taipei) Cheng W-h (Chinese Taipei) Chien Y-c	19	16
5	(China) Du J (China) Pan P	21	21
(Singapore) S M Sari (Singapore) Yao L	7	11
8	(China) Tian Q (China) Zhao YL	21	21

Semifinals
5	(China) Du J (China) Pan P	21	18
8	(China) Tian Q (China) Zhao YL	23	21

=== Bottom half ===
First Round
Q3	(Malaysia) V Hoo (Malaysia) Lim Y L	14	21	21
Q2	(Malaysia) S Cheah (Malaysia) Yang L L	21	16	16
(Malaysia) Lyn C E Y (Malaysia) Lim Y F	2	9
7	(China) Cheng S (China) Ma J	21	21
(Malaysia) Chin E H (Malaysia) Goh L Y	19	18
(South Korea) Ha J-e (South Korea) Kim M-j	21	21
(Japan) M Matsutomo (Japan) A Takahashi	21	21
3	(Thailand) D Aroonkesorn (Thailand) K Voravichitchaikul	12	20
(Indonesia) K Dewi (Indonesia) S R Andini	21	21
(Netherlands) L Jonathans (Netherlands) P van Dooremalen	18	18
(Malaysia) Ng H E (Malaysia) Ng H L	11	8
6	(China) Wang XL (China) Yu Y	21	21
(Chinese Taipei) Pai H-m (Chinese Taipei) Tai T-y	21	21
(Malaysia) Lim C S (Malaysia) Z N Hedayu	8	13
(Malaysia) Chan W R (Malaysia) S J Lai	6	10
2	(Bulgaria) P Nedelcheva (Russia) A Russkikh	21	21

Second Round
Q3	(Malaysia) V Hoo (Malaysia) Lim Y L	17	12
7	(China) Cheng S (China) Ma J	21	21
(South Korea) Ha J-e (South Korea) Kim M-j	w	/	o
(Japan) M Matsutomo (Japan) A Takahashi
(Indonesia) K Dewi (Indonesia) S R Andini	10	4
6	(China) Wang XL (China) Yu Y	21	21
(Chinese Taipei) Pai H-m (Chinese Taipei) Tai T-y	6	15
2	(Bulgaria) P Nedelcheva (Russia) A Russkikh	21	21

Quarterfinals
7	(China) Cheng S (China) Ma J	21	21
(South Korea) Ha J-e (South Korea) Kim M-j	18	15
6	(China) Wang XL (China) Yu Y	21	21
2	(Bulgaria) P Nedelcheva (Russia) A Russkikh	15	10

Semifinals
7	(China) Cheng S (China) Ma J	20	19
6	(China) Wang XL (China) Yu Y	22	21

=== Finals ===
Semifinals
5	(China) Du Jing (China) Pan Pan	21	18
8	(China) Tian Qing (China) Zhao Yunlei	23	21
7	(China) Cheng Shu (China) Ma Jin	20	19
6	(China) Wang Xiaoli (China) Yu Yang	22	21

Final
8	(China) Tian Qing (China) Zhao Yunlei	21	6	21
6	(China) Wang Xiaoli (China) Yu Yang	12	21	17

== Mixed doubles ==
=== Seeds ===
1. (Thailand) Sudket Prapakamol / Saralee Thungthongkam (first round)
2. (South Korea) Ko Sung-hyun / Ha Jung-eun (quarter-finals)
3. (China) Zhang Nan / Zhao Yunlei (quarter-finals)
4. (Chinese Taipei) Chen Hung-ling / Cheng Wen-hsing (quarter-finals)
5. (China) Tao Jiaming / Tian Qing (final)
6. (Denmark) Joachim Fischer Nielsen / Christinna Pedersen (semi-finals)
7. (China) He Hanbin / Ma Jin (champions)
8. (Indonesia) Tontowi Ahmad / Liliyana Natsir (first round)

=== Top half ===
First Round
1	(Thailand) S Prapakamol (Thailand) S Thungthongkam	20	19
(Japan) S Ikeda (Japan) R Shiota	22	21
(Thailand) S Anugritayawon (Thailand) K Voravichitchaikul	21	21
Q1	(Malaysia) Tan W K (Malaysia) Ng M P L	12	12
8	(Indonesia) T Ahmad (Indonesia) L Natsir	19	11
(China) Xu C (China) Yu Y	21	21
Q4	(Scotland) R Blair (England) G White	17	21	21
(Thailand) P Chalardchaleam (Thailand) S Amitrapai	21	14	17
4	(Chinese Taipei) Chen H-l (Chinese Taipei) Cheng W-h	21	21
(Singapore) C Triyachart (Singapore) V Neo	11	12
(India) V. Diju (India) J Gutta	21	21
(Germany) J Schöttler (Germany) S Marinello	12	13
5	(China) Tao JM (China) Tian Q	21	18	21
(Indonesia) N Widianto (Indonesia) V Marissa	16	21	19
(Japan) K Hayakawa (Japan) S Matsuo	15	13
(South Korea) Yoo Y-s (South Korea) Kim M-j	21	21

Second Round
(Japan) S Ikeda (Japan) R Shiota	19	17
(Thailand) S Anugritayawon (Thailand) K Voravichitchaikul	21	21
(China) Xu C (China) Yu Y	19	14
Q4	(Scotland) R Blair (England) G White	21	21
4	(Chinese Taipei) Chen H-l (Chinese Taipei) Cheng W-h	20	21	21
(India) V. Diju (India) J Gutta	22	15	19
5	(China) Tao JM (China) Tian Q	21	12	21
(South Korea) Yoo Y-s (South Korea) Kim M-j	16	21	10

Quarterfinals
(Thailand) S Anugritayawon (Thailand) K Voravichitchaikul	15	21	17
Q4	(Scotland) R Blair (England) G White	21	18	21
4	(Chinese Taipei) Chen H-l (Chinese Taipei) Cheng W-h	23	12	13
5	(China) Tao JM (China) Tian Q	21	21	21

Semifinals
Q4	(Scotland) R Blair (England) G White	11	15
5	(China) Tao JM (China) Tian Q	21	21

=== Bottom half ===
First Round
(Denmark) M Pieler Kolding (Denmark) J Houmann	13	21	16
Q3	(Japan) K Kazuno (Japan) M Matsutomo	21	11	21
(Germany) M Fuchs (Germany) B Michels	12	13
6	(Denmark) J Fischer Nielsen (Denmark) C Pedersen	21	21
Q2	(Malaysia) Koo K K (Malaysia) Chin E H	8	13
(Indonesia) M Rijal (Indonesia) D Susanto	21	21
(England) C Adcock (Scotland) I Bankier	4^{r}
3	(China) Zhang N (China) Zhao YL	6
(Indonesia) F Kurniawan (Indonesia) P Z Bernadet	21	16	21
(Malaysia) Chan P S (Malaysia) Goh L Y	16	21	18
(Hong Kong) Wong W H (Hong Kong) Chau H W	7	8
7	(China) He HB (China) Ma J	21	21
(Singapore) H Wijaya (Singapore) Yao L	21	22	21
(Chinese Taipei) Lin Y-l (Chinese Taipei) Chien Y-c	16	24	19
(Malaysia) Ong J G (Malaysia) Chong S C	17	17
2	(South Korea) Ko S-h (South Korea) Ha J-e	21	21

Second Round
Q3	(Japan) K Kazuno (Japan) M Matsutomo	17	20
6	(Denmark) J Fischer Nielsen (Denmark) C Pedersen	21	22
(Indonesia) M Rijal (Indonesia) D Susanto	14	13
3	(China) Zhang N (China) Zhao YL	21	21
(Indonesia) F Kurniawan (Indonesia) P Z Bernadet	21	14
7	(China) He HB (China) Ma J	23	21
(Singapore) H Wijaya (Singapore) Yao L	15	13
2	(South Korea) Ko S-h (South Korea) Ha J-e	21	21

Quarterfinals
6	(Denmark) J Fischer Nielsen (Denmark) C Pedersen	20	21	21
3	(China) Zhang N (China) Zhao YL	22	12	19
7	(China) He HB (China) Ma J	16	21	21
2	(South Korea) Ko S-h (South Korea) Ha J-e	21	11	19

Semifinals
6	(Denmark) J Fischer Nielsen (Denmark) C Pedersen	17	14^{r}
7	(China) He HB (China) Ma J	21	17

=== Finals ===
Semifinals
Q4	(Scotland) Robert Blair (England) Gabrielle White	11	15
5	(China) Tao Jiaming (China) Tian Qing	21	21
6	(Denmark) Joachim Fischer Nielsen (Denmark) Christinna Pedersen	17	14^{r}
7	(China) He Hanbin (China) Ma Jin	21	17

Final
5	(China) Tao Jiaming (China) Tian Qing	13	21	16
7	(China) He Hanbin (China) Ma Jin	21	13'	21

Preceded by 2010 Malaysia Super Series	Malaysia Super Series	Succeeded by 2012 Malaysia Super Series
Preceded by 2010 BWF Super Series Masters Finals	BWF Super Series; 2011 season	Succeeded by 2011 Korea Open Super Series Premier
