= 2012 Korea Open Super Series Premier =

Tournament details
- Dates: 3 January 2012 – 8 January 2012
- Edition: 22nd
- Level: Super Series Premier
- Total prize money: US$1,000,000
- Venue: Seoul Olympic Gymnasium 2
- Location: Seoul, South Korea

Champions
- Men's singles: (Malaysia) Lee Chong Wei
- Women's singles: (China) Wang Shixian
- Men's doubles: (China) Cai Yun (China) Fu Haifeng
- Women's doubles: (China) Tian Qing (China) Zhao Yunlei
- Mixed doubles: (China) Xu Chen (China) Ma Jin

The 2012 Korea Open Super Series Premier was the first tournament of the 2012 BWF Super Series. The tournament was held in Seoul, South Korea from 3–8 January 2012 and had a total purse of $1,000,000.

== Men's singles ==
=== Seeds ===
1. (Malaysia) Lee Chong Wei
2. (China) Lin Dan
3. (China) Chen Long
4. (Denmark) Peter Gade
5. (China) Chen Jin
6. (Japan) Sho Sasaki
7. (Vietnam) Nguyễn Tiến Minh
8. (Indonesia) Simon Santoso

=== Top half ===
First Round
1 | (Malaysia) Lee C W | 21 | 21
(India) K Parupalli | 11 | 16
(India) A Jayaram | 15 | 15
(South Korea) Son W-h | 21 | 21
7 | (Vietnam) Nguyễn T M | 21 | 10 | 9
(Japan) K Tago | 19 | 21 | 21
Q3 | (Singapore) Yong Z A C | 19 | 21 | 22
Q1 | (South Korea) Sung M P | 21 | 17 | 20
4 | (Denmark) P Gade | 9 | 12
(China) Du PY | 21 | 21
(Hong Kong) Hu Y | 21 | 21
(Denmark) H-K Vittinghus | 13 | 6
8 | (Indonesia) S Santoso | 21 | 21
(Japan) K Yamada | 11 | 16
(Indonesia) T Hidayat | 19 | 15
(England) R Ouseph | 21 | 21

Second Round
1 | (Malaysia) Lee C W | 13 | 21 | 21
(South Korea) Son W-h | 21 | 14 | 15
(Japan) K Tago | 21 | 21
Q3 | (Singapore) Yong Z A C | 10 | 13
(China) Du PY | 21 | 14 | 21
(Hong Kong) Hu Y | 5 | 21 | 19
8 | (Indonesia) S Santoso | 21 | 21
(England) R Ouseph | 18 | 13

Quarterfinals
1 | (Malaysia) Lee C W | 21 | 21
(Japan) K Tago | 18 | 17
(China) Du PY | 21 | 21
8 | (Indonesia) S Santoso | 16 | 19

Semifinals
1 | (Malaysia) Lee C W | 21 | 21
(China) Du PY | 8 | 13

=== Bottom half ===
First Round
(Thailand) B Ponsana | 9 | 12
(China) Wang ZM | 21 | 21
(Indonesia) T Sugiarto | 14 | 12
6 | (Japan) S Sasaki | 21 | 21
(Germany) M Zwiebler | 21 | 21
(Poland) P Wacha | 7 | 14
Q4 | (Chinese Taipei) Hsu J-h | 20 | 21
3 | (China) Chen L | 15^{r}
(Indonesia) D H Rumbaka | 23 | 12
(Denmark) J Ø Jørgensen | 25 | 21
Q2 | (Hong Kong) Chan Y K | 19 | 17
5 | (China) Chen J | 21 | 21
(Hong Kong) Wong W K | 14 | 9
(South Korea) Lee H-i | 21 | 21
(Spain) P Abián | 18 | 22 | 10
2 | (China) Lin D | 21 | 20 | 21

Second Round
(China) Wang ZM | 11 | 17
6 | (Japan) S Sasaki | 21 | 21
(Germany) M Zwiebler | 21 | 19 | 21
Q4 | (Chinese Taipei) Hsu J-h | 14 | 21 | 17
(Denmark) J Ø Jørgensen | 15 | 21 | 21
5 | (China) Chen J | 21 | 16 | 12
(South Korea) Lee H-i | 21 | 12 | 10
2 | (China) Lin D | 11 | 21 | 21

Quarterfinals
6 | (Japan) S Sasaki | 21 | 22
(Germany) M Zwiebler | 18 | 20
(Denmark) J Ø Jørgensen | 13 | 21 | 15
2 | (China) Lin D | 21 | 8 | 21

Semifinals
6 | (Japan) S Sasaki | 16 | 14
2 | (China) Lin D | 21 | 21

=== Finals ===
Semifinals
1 | (Malaysia) Lee Chong Wei | 21 | 21
(China) Du Pengyu | 8 | 13
6 | (Japan) Sho Sasaki | 16 | 14
2 | (China) Lin Dan | 21 | 21

Final
1 | (Malaysia) Lee Chong Wei | 12 | 21 | 21
2 | (China) Lin Dan | 21 | 18 | 14

== Women's singles ==
=== Seeds ===
1. (China) Wang Yihan
2. (China) Wang Shixian
3. (China) Wang Xin
4. (India) Saina Nehwal
5. (Denmark) Tine Baun
6. (China) Jiang Yanjiao
7. (Germany) Juliane Schenk
8. (South Korea) Sung Ji-hyun

=== Top half ===
First Round
1 | (China) Wang YH | 21 | 14 | 21
(Netherlands) Yao J | 15 | 21 | 9
Q2 | (South Korea) Hwang H-y | 21 | 21
(Bulgaria) P Nedelcheva | 17 | 17
7 | (Germany) J Schenk | 21 | 21
(China) Liu X | 14 | 16
(France) Pi HY | 22 | 21 | 16
Q4 | (Hong Kong) Poon L Y | 24 | 7 | 21
4 | (India) S Nehwal | 21 | 21
(Scotland) S Egelstaff | 5 | 6
(Chinese Taipei) Cheng S-c | 21 | 21
(Japan) S Sato | 12 | 18
6 | (China) Jiang YJ | 21 | 21
(Bulgaria) L Zetchiri | 13 | 11
(Thailand) R Intanon | 15 | 21 | 21
(Japan) A Goto | 21 | 19 | 18

Second Round
1 | (China) Wang YH | 21 | 21
Q2 | (South Korea) Hwang H-y | 18 | 11
7 | (Germany) J Schenk | 21 | 21
Q4 | (Hong Kong) Poon L Y | 10 | 16
4 | (India) S Nehwal | 21 | 21
(Chinese Taipei) Cheng S-c | 14 | 10
6 | (China) Jiang YJ | 21 | 21
(Thailand) R Intanon | 16 | 15

Quarterfinals
1 | (China) Wang YH | 21 | 21
7 | (Germany) J Schenk | 10 | 11
4 | (India) S Nehwal | 17 | 10
6 | (China) Jiang YJ | 21 | 21

Semifinals
1 | (China) Wang YH | 13 | 19
6 | (China) Jiang YJ | 21 | 21

=== Bottom half ===
First Round
(Spain) C Marín | 21 | 17 | 19
(China) Li XR | 16 | 21 | 21
(Canada) M Li | 8 | 11
5 | (Denmark) T Baun | 21 | 21
Q1 | (Chinese Taipei) Pai H-m | 21 | 21
Q3 | (Hong Kong) Tse Y S | 19 | 13
(South Korea) Bae Y-j | 10 | 21 | 21
3 | (China) Wang X | 21 | 18 | 14
(Singapore) Gu J | 21 | 14 | 21
(Thailand) P Buranaprasertsuk | 13 | 21 | 14
(Chinese Taipei) Tai T-y | 21 | 21
8 | (South Korea) Sung J-h | 19 | 19
(Japan) E Hirose | 16 | 13
(Hong Kong) Yip P Y | 21 | 21
(Singapore) Fu MT | 11 | 12
2 | (China) Wang SX | 21 | 21

Second Round
(China) Li XR | 21 | 18 | 21
5 | (Denmark) T Baun | 15 | 21 | 7
Q1 | (Chinese Taipei) Pai H-m | 21 | 13 | 12
(South Korea) Bae Y-j | 11 | 21 | 21
(Singapore) Gu J | 21 | 21
(Chinese Taipei) Tai T-y | 15 | 18
(Hong Kong) Yip P Y | 11 | 7
2 | (China) Wang SX | 21 | 21

Quarterfinals
(China) Li XR | 18 | 16
(South Korea) Bae Y-j | 21 | 21
(Singapore) Gu J | 17 | 13
2 | (China) Wang SX | 21 | 21

Semifinals
(South Korea) Bae Y-j | 15 | 16
2 | (China) Wang SX | 21 | 21

=== Finals ===
Semifinals
1 | (China) Wang Yihan | 13 | 19
6 | (China) Jiang Yanjiao | 21 | 21
(South Korea) Bae Youn-joo | 15 | 16
2 | (China) Wang Shixian | 21 | 21

Final
6 | (China) Jiang Yanjiao | 12 | 17
2 | (China) Wang Shixian | 21 | 21

== Men's doubles ==
=== Seeds ===
1. (China) Cai Yun / Fu Haifeng
2. (South Korea) Jung Jae-sung / Lee Yong-dae
3. (Denmark) Mathias Boe / Carsten Mogensen
4. (South Korea) Ko Sung-hyun / Yoo Yeon-seong
5. (Malaysia) Koo Kien Keat / Tan Boon Heong
6. (Indonesia) Mohammad Ahsan / Bona Septano
7. (China) Chai Biao / Guo Zhendong
8. (Japan) Hirokatsu Hashimoto / Noriyasu Hirata

=== Top half ===
First Round
1 | (China) Cai Y (China) Fu HF | 21 | 21
(Poland) A Cwalina (Poland) M Łogosz | 17 | 12
Q1 | (Denmark) R Bonde (Denmark) A Kristiansen | 12 | 17
Q2 | (Thailand) B Isara (Thailand) M Jongjit | 21 | 21
7 | (China) Chai B (China) Guo ZD | 20 | 19
(Indonesia) M Kido (Indonesia) H Setiawan | 22 | 21
(Malaysia) Gan T C (Malaysia) Tan B S | 21 | 16 | 17
(Germany) M Fuchs (Germany) O Roth | 13 | 21 | 21
4 | (South Korea) Ko S-h (South Korea) Yoo Y-s | 14 | 21 | 21
(China) Liu XL (China) Qiu ZH | 21 | 9 | 15
(Denmark) M Conrad-Petersen (Denmark) J Rasmussen | 21 | 21
(England) C Adcock (England) A Ellis | 12 | 13
6 | (Indonesia) M Ahsan (Indonesia) B Septano | 17 | 21 | 12
(Japan) N Kawamae (Japan) S Sato | 21 | 19 | 21
(Germany) I Kindervater (Germany) J Schöttler | 12 | 6^{r}
(Japan) H Endo (Japan) K Hayakawa | 21 | 14

Second Round
1 | (China) Cai Y (China) Fu HF | 15 | 21 | 22
Q2 | (Thailand) B Isara (Thailand) M Jongjit | 21 | 16 | 20
(Indonesia) M Kido (Indonesia) H Setiawan | 17 | 19
(Germany) M Fuchs (Germany) O Roth | 21 | 21
4 | (South Korea) Ko S-h (South Korea) Yoo Y-s | 21 | 21
(Denmark) M Conrad-Petersen (Denmark) J Rasmussen | 10 | 13
(Japan) N Kawamae (Japan) S Sato | 15 | 16
(Japan) H Endo (Japan) K Hayakawa | 21 | 21

Quarterfinals
1 | (China) Cai Y (China) Fu HF | 21 | 21
(Germany) M Fuchs (Germany) O Roth | 12 | 15
4 | (South Korea) Ko S-h (South Korea) Yoo Y-s | 21 | 21
(Japan) H Endo (Japan) K Hayakawa | 16 | 14

Semifinals
1 | (China) Cai Y (China) Fu HF | 21 | 21
4 | (South Korea) Ko S-h (South Korea) Yoo Y-s | 13 | 14

=== Bottom half ===
First Round
Q3 | (Chinese Taipei) Liao M-c (Chinese Taipei) Wu C-w | 21 | 18 | 21
(Indonesia) A Pratama (Indonesia) R A Saputro | 12 | 21 | 17
(South Korea) Kim K-j (South Korea) Kim S-r | 21 | 24
8 | (Japan) H Hashimoto (Japan) N Hirata | 15 | 22
(Russia) V Durkin (Russia) A Nikolaenko | 21 | 13 | 13
(China) Hong W (China) Shen Y | 19 | 21 | 21
(United States) H Bach (United States) T Gunawan | 17 | 21 | 18
3 | (Denmark) M Boe (Denmark) C Mogensen | 21 | 15 | 21
Q4 | (South Korea) Cho G-w (South Korea) Shin B-c | 21 | 15 | 16
(Chinese Taipei) Fang C-m (Chinese Taipei) Lee S-m | 15 | 21 | 21
(Netherlands) R Bosch (Netherlands) K Ridder | 15 | 10
5 | (Malaysia) Koo K K (Malaysia) Tan B H | 21 | 21
(Chinese Taipei) Chen H-l (Chinese Taipei) Lin Y-l | 16 | 21 | 17
(Indonesia) A Y Chandra (Indonesia) H A Gunawan | 21 | 18 | 21
(India) R Kumar K.T. (India) S Thomas | 14 | 14
2 | (South Korea) Jung J-s (South Korea) Lee Y-d | 21 | 21

Second Round
Q3 | (Chinese Taipei) Liao M-c (Chinese Taipei) Wu C-w | 15 | 22 | 7
(South Korea) Kim K-j (South Korea) Kim S-r | 21 | 20 | 21
(China) Hong W (China) Shen Y | 21 | 21
3 | (Denmark) M Boe (Denmark) C Mogensen | 18 | 15
(Chinese Taipei) Fang C-m (Chinese Taipei) Lee S-m | 13 | 22 | 24
5 | (Malaysia) Koo K K (Malaysia) Tan B H | 21 | 20 | 22
(Indonesia) A Y Chandra (Indonesia) H A Gunawan | 21 | 19 | 13
2 | (South Korea) Jung J-s (South Korea) Lee Y-d | 16 | 21 | 21

Quarterfinals
(South Korea) Kim K-j (South Korea) Kim S-r | 21 | 22
(China) Hong W (China) Shen Y | 16 | 20
(Chinese Taipei) Fang C-m (Chinese Taipei) Lee S-m | 16 | 12
2 | (South Korea) Jung J-s (South Korea) Lee Y-d | 21 | 21

Semifinals
(South Korea) Kim K-j (South Korea) Kim S-r | 15 | 25
2 | (South Korea) Jung J-s (South Korea) Lee Y-d | 21 | 27

=== Finals ===
Semifinals
1 | (China) Cai Yun (China) Fu Haifeng | 21 | 21
4 | (South Korea) Ko Sung-hyun (South Korea) Yoo Yeon-seong | 13 | 14
(South Korea) Kim Ki-jung (South Korea) Kim Sa-rang | 15 | 25
2 | (South Korea) Jung Jae-sung (South Korea) Lee Yong-dae | 21 | 27

Final
1 | (China) Cai Yun (China) Fu Haifeng | 18 | 21 | 21
2 | (South Korea) Jung Jae-sung (South Korea) Lee Yong-dae | 21 | 17 | 19

== Women's doubles ==
=== Seeds ===
1. (China) Wang Xiaoli / Yu Yang
2. (China) Tian Qing / Zhao Yunlei
3. (Japan) Mizuki Fujii / Reika Kakiiwa
4. (South Korea) Ha Jung-eun / Kim Min-jung
5. (Japan) Miyuki Maeda / Satoko Suetsuna
6. (Chinese Taipei) Cheng Wen-hsing / Chien Yu-chin
7. (Japan) Shizuka Matsuo / Mami Naito
8. (Indonesia) Meiliana Jauhari / Greysia Polii

=== Top half ===
First Round
1 | (China) Wang XL (China) Yu Y | 21 | 21
(United States) I Wang (United States) R Wang | 7 | 5
(India) J Gutta (India) A Ponnappa | 21 | 21
(Malaysia) V Hoo (Malaysia) Woon K W | 19 | 18
6 | (Chinese Taipei) Cheng W-h (Chinese Taipei) Chien Y-c | 16 | 13
(Malaysia) Chin E H (Malaysia) Wong P T | 21 | 21
(Hong Kong) Poon L Y (Hong Kong) Tse Y S | 11 | 18
(Singapore) S M Sari (Singapore) Yao L | 21 | 21
4 | (South Korea) Ha J-e (South Korea) Kim M-j | 21 | 21
Q4 | (Chinese Taipei) Hsieh P-c (Chinese Taipei) Wang P-r | 7 | 15
Q2 | (China) Cheng S (China) Pan P | 21 | 21
(Russia) V Sorokina (Russia) N Vislova | 8 | 10
8 | (Indonesia) M Jauhari (Indonesia) G Polii | 21 | 21
Q3 | (Malaysia) Ng H E (Malaysia) Ng H L | 16 | 17
(Netherlands) L Jonathans (Netherlands) P van Dooremalen | 19 | 15
(Denmark) L Damkæjr Kruse (Denmark) M Rœpke | 21 | 21

Second Round
1 | (China) Wang XL (China) Yu Y | 21 | 21
(India) J Gutta (India) A Ponnappa | 10 | 17
(Malaysia) Chin E H (Malaysia) Wong P T | 26 | 8
(Singapore) S M Sari (Singapore) Yao L | 28 | 21
4 | (South Korea) Ha J-e (South Korea) Kim M-j | 21 | 21
Q2 | (China) Cheng S (China) Pan P | 16 | 13
8 | (Indonesia) M Jauhari (Indonesia) G Polii | 21 | 21
(Denmark) L Damkæjr Kruse (Denmark) M Rœpke | 10 | 14

Quarterfinals
1 | (China) Wang XL (China) Yu Y | 21 | 21
(Singapore) S M Sari (Singapore) Yao L | 12 | 10
4 | (South Korea) Ha J-e (South Korea) Kim M-j | 21 | 21
8 | (Indonesia) M Jauhari (Indonesia) G Polii | 8 | 9

Semifinals
1 | (China) Wang XL (China) Yu Y | 21 | 15 | 17
4 | (South Korea) Ha J-e (South Korea) Kim M-j | 12 | 21 | 21

=== Bottom half ===
First Round
(Thailand) D Aroonkesorn (Thailand) K Voravichitchaikul | 14 | 15
(Denmark) C Pedersen (Denmark) K Rytter Juhl | 21 | 21
(Canada) N Grether (Canada) C Reid | 7 | 9
7 | (Japan) S Matsuo (Japan) M Naito | 21 | 21
Q1 | (South Korea) Kim C-m (South Korea) Park S-y | 8 | 16
(South Korea) Jung K-e (South Korea) Kim H-n | 21 | 21
(Indonesia) V Marissa (Indonesia) N Melati | 9 | 21 | 21
3 | (Japan) M Fujii (Japan) R Kakiiwa | 21 | 14 | 16
(Germany) S Marinello (Germany) B Michels | 21 | 24
(Sweden) E Lennartsson (Sweden) E Wengberg | 17 | 22
(England) M Agathangelou (England) H Olver | 12 | 13
5 | (Japan) M Maeda (Japan) S Suetsuna | 21 | 21
(South Korea) Eom H-w (South Korea) Jang Y-n | 18 | 22 | 19
(China) Bao YX (China) Zhong QX | 21 | 20 | 21
(Indonesia) A F Agustin (Indonesia) N K Maheswari | 18 | 20
2 | (China) Tian Q (China) Zhao YL | 21 | 22

Second Round
(Denmark) C Pedersen (Denmark) K Rytter Juhl | 18 | 6
7 | (Japan) S Matsuo (Japan) M Naito | 21 | 21
(South Korea) Jung K-e (South Korea) Kim H-n | 16 | 21 | 21
(Indonesia) V Marissa (Indonesia) N Melati | 21 | 19 | 9
(Germany) S Marinello (Germany) B Michels | 15 | 17
5 | (Japan) M Maeda (Japan) S Suetsuna | 21 | 21
(China) Bao YX (China) Zhong QX | 17 | 6
2 | (China) Tian Q (China) Zhao YL | 21 | 21

Quarterfinals
7 | (Japan) S Matsuo (Japan) M Naito | 18 | 13
(South Korea) Jung K-e (South Korea) Kim H-n | 21 | 21
5 | (Japan) M Maeda (Japan) S Suetsuna | 16 | 18
2 | (China) Tian Q (China) Zhao YL | 21 | 21

Semifinals
(South Korea) Jung K-e (South Korea) Kim H-n | 26 | 5 | 13
2 | (China) Tian Q (China) Zhao YL | 24 | 21 | 21

=== Finals ===
Semifinals
1 | (China) Wang Xiaoli (China) Yu Yang | 21 | 15 | 17
4 | (South Korea) Ha Jung-eun (South Korea) Kim Min-jung | 12 | 21 | 21
(South Korea) Jung Kyung-eun (South Korea) Kim Ha-na | 26 | 5 | 13
2 | (China) Tian Qing (China) Zhao Yunlei | 24 | 21 | 21

Final
4 | (South Korea) Ha Jung-eun (South Korea) Kim Min-jung | 18 | 13
2 | (China) Tian Qing (China) Zhao Yunlei | 21 | 21

== Mixed doubles ==
=== Seeds ===
1. (China) Zhang Nan / Zhao Yunlei
2. (China) Xu Chen / Ma Jin
3. (Denmark) Joachim Fischer Nielsen / Christinna Pedersen
4. (Indonesia) Tontowi Ahmad / Liliyana Natsir
5. (Chinese Taipei) Chen Hung-ling / Cheng Wen-hsing
6. (Thailand) Sudket Prapakamol / Saralee Thungthongkam
7. (Thailand) Songphon Anugritayawon / Kunchala Voravichitchaikul
8. (Denmark) Thomas Laybourn / Kamilla Rytter Juhl

=== Top half ===
First Round
1 | (China) Zhang N (China) Zhao YL | 19 | 16
(England) C Adcock (Scotland) I Bankier | 21 | 21
(Indonesia) M Rijal (Indonesia) D Susanto | 16 | 14
(China) He HB (China) Bao YX | 21 | 21
7 | (Thailand) S Anugritayawon (Thailand) K Voravichitchaikul | 13 | 8
(Russia) A Nikolaenko (Russia) V Sorokina | 21 | 21
(Poland) R Mateusiak (Poland) N Zięba | 11 | 21 | 21
(Singapore) D B Chrisnanta (Singapore) V Neo | 21 | 9 | 19
4 | (Indonesia) T Ahmad (Indonesia) L Natsir | 16 | 21 | 21
(Germany) M Fuchs (Germany) B Michels | 21 | 18 | 13
Q4 | (Japan) N Hirata (Japan) M Maeda | 21 | 21
(Canada) T Ng (Canada) G Gao | 10 | 16
6 | (Thailand) S Prapakamol (Thailand) S Thungthongkam | 17 | 13
(Japan) S Ikeda (Japan) R Shiota | 21 | 21
Q2 | (South Korea) Yoo Y-s (South Korea) Jang Y-n | 20 | 22
(South Korea) Lee Y-d (South Korea) Ha J-e | 24 | 22

Second Round
(England) C Adcock (Scotland) I Bankier | 14 | 17
(China) He HB (China) Bao YX | 21 | 21
(Russia) A Nikolaenko (Russia) V Sorokina | 21 | 21
(Poland) R Mateusiak (Poland) N Zięba | 13 | 18
4 | (Indonesia) T Ahmad (Indonesia) L Natsir | 21 | 21
Q4 | (Japan) N Hirata (Japan) M Maeda | 14 | 12
(Japan) S Ikeda (Japan) R Shiota | 15 | 15
(South Korea) Lee Y-d (South Korea) Ha J-e | 21 | 21

Quarterfinals
(China) He HB (China) Bao YX | 14 | 21 | 12
(Russia) A Nikolaenko (Russia) V Sorokina | 21 | 13 | 21
4 | (Indonesia) T Ahmad (Indonesia) L Natsir | 16 | 21 | 16
(South Korea) Lee Y-d (South Korea) Ha J-e | 21 | 15 | 21

Semifinals
(Russia) A Nikolaenko (Russia) V Sorokina | 18 | 15
(South Korea) Lee Y-d (South Korea) Ha J-e | 21 | 21

=== Bottom half ===
First Round
(Malaysia) Chan P S (Malaysia) Goh L Y | 18 | 18
(India) V Diju (India) J Gutta | 21 | 21
(South Korea) Ko S-h (South Korea) Eom H-w | 21 | 21
5 | (Chinese Taipei) Chen H-l (Chinese Taipei) Cheng W-h | 18 | 15
(Singapore) C Triyachart (Singapore) Yao L | 21 | 22
(Japan) S Sato (Japan) S Matsuo | 23 | 24
Q1 | (South Korea) Shin B-c (South Korea) Kim H-n | 21 | 18 | 11
3 | (Denmark) J Fischer Nielsen (Denmark) C Pedersen | 10 | 21 | 21
(Thailand) M Jongjit (Thailand) S Amitrapai | 14 | 21 | 21
(England) N Robertson (England) J Wallwork | 21 | 17 | 12
(Scotland) R Blair (England) G White | 13 | 12
8 | (Denmark) T Laybourn (Denmark) K Rytter Juhl | 21 | 21
Q3 | (Russia) V Durkin (Russia) N Vislova | 21 | 22
(Chinese Taipei) Lee S-m (Chinese Taipei) Chien Y-c | 18 | 20
(Indonesia) N Widianto (Indonesia) V Marissa | 9 | 10
2 | (China) Xu C (China) Ma J | 21 | 21

Second Round
(India) V Diju (India) J Gutta | 21 | 10 | 21
(South Korea) Ko S-h (South Korea) Eom H-w | 7 | 21 | 16
(Japan) S Sato (Japan) S Matsuo | 22 | 18 | 18
3 | (Denmark) J Fischer Nielsen (Denmark) C Pedersen | 20 | 21 | 21
(Thailand) M Jongjit (Thailand) S Amitrapai | 21 | 17 | 16
8 | (Denmark) T Laybourn (Denmark) K Rytter Juhl | 17 | 21 | 21
Q3 | (Russia) V Durkin (Russia) N Vislova | 15 | 16
2 | (China) Xu C (China) Ma J | 21 | 21

Quarterfinals
(India) V Diju (India) J Gutta | 19 | 12
3 | (Denmark) J Fischer Nielsen (Denmark) C Pedersen | 21 | 21
8 | (Denmark) T Laybourn (Denmark) K Rytter Juhl | 18 | 13
2 | (China) Xu C (China) Ma J | 21 | 21

Semifinals
3 | (Denmark) J Fischer Nielsen (Denmark) C Pedersen | 17 | 8
2 | (China) Xu C (China) Ma J | 21 | 21

=== Finals ===
Semifinals
(Russia) Aleksandr Nikolaenko (Russia) Valeria Sorokina | 18 | 15
(South Korea) Lee Yong-dae (South Korea) Ha Jung-eun | 21 | 21
3 | (Denmark) Joachim Fischer Nielsen (Denmark) Christinna Pedersen | 17 | 8
2 | (China) Xu Chen (China) Ma Jin | 21 | 21

Final
(South Korea) Lee Yong-dae (South Korea) Ha Jung-eun | 12 | 21 | 10
2 | (China) Xu Chen (China) Ma Jin | 21 | 19 | 21

| Preceded by 2011 Korea Open Super Series Premier | Korea Open | Succeeded by 2013 Korea Open Super Series Premier |
| Preceded by 2011 BWF Super Series Masters Finals | BWF Super Series; 2012 season | Succeeded by 2012 Malaysia Super Series |
