= 2011 Korea Open Super Series Premier =

Tournament details
- Dates: 25–30 January
- Edition: 21st
- Total prize money: US$1,200,000
- Venue: Olympic Gymnastics Arena
- Location: Seoul, South Korea

Champions
- Men's singles: (China) Lin Dan
- Women's singles: (China) Wang Yihan
- Men's doubles: (South Korea) Jung Jae-sung (South Korea) Lee Yong-dae
- Women's doubles: (China) Wang Xiaoli (China) Yu Yang
- Mixed doubles: (China) Zhang Nan (China) Zhao Yunlei

The 2011 Korea Open Super Series Premier was the second tournament of the 2011 BWF Super Series. It was the first competition under the new format where a select group of Super Series events were elevated to premier status. The tournament was held in Seoul, South Korea from 25 to 30 January 2011 and had a total purse of $1,200,000.

== Men's singles ==
=== Seeds ===
1. (Malaysia) Lee Chong Wei (final)
2. (Indonesia) Taufik Hidayat (quarter-finals)
3. (Denmark) Peter Gade (quarter-finals)
4. (China) Chen Long (second round)
5. (China) Chen Jin (second round)
6. (China) Lin Dan (champion)
7. (Thailand) Boonsak Ponsana (first round)
8. (China) Bao Chunlai (second round)

=== Top half ===
First Round
1	(Malaysia) Lee C W	21	18	21
(Denmark) J Ø. Jørgensen	9	21	16
(Poland) P Wacha	14	10
(South Korea) Park S-h	21	21
5	(China) Chen J	21	21
(Malaysia) Wong C H	9	17
(Japan) K Yamada	14	13
Q4	(China) Wang ZM	21	21
4	(China) Chen L	21	18	21
(Vietnam) Nguyễn T M	11	21	10
(South Korea) Son W-h	24	15	12
(Japan) K Tago	22	21	21
8	(China) Bao CL	21	21
PFQ	(England) C Baxter	13	7
(Netherlands) D Palyama	23	15	17
(China) Du PY	21	21	21

Second Round
1	(Malaysia) Lee C W	21	21
(South Korea) Park S-h	14	9
5	(China) Chen J	11	14
Q4	(China) Wang ZM	21	21
4	(China) Chen L	22	21	16
(Japan) K Tago	20	23	21
8	(China) Bao CL	16	13
(China) Du PY	21	21

Quarterfinals
1	(Malaysia) Lee C W	21	21
Q4	(China) Wang ZM	14	19
(Japan) K Tago	17	11
(China) Du PY	21	21

Semifinals
1	(Malaysia) Lee C W	21	21
(China) Du PY	10	10

=== Bottom half ===
First Round
(Hong Kong) Hu Y	16	17
(England) R Ouseph	21	21
(Indonesia) S Santoso	21	21
7	(Thailand) B Ponsana	16	14
(India) P Kashyap	21	21
(Thailand) T Saensomboonsuk	17	9
(Indonesia) D H Rumbaka	17	10
3	(Denmark) P Gade	21	21
(Germany) M Zwiebler	21	21
(Malaysia) M H Hashim	16	13
Q1	(Indonesia) T Sugiarto	15	15
6	(China) Lin D	21	21
Q2	(France) B Leverdez	22	17	16
Q3	(Hong Kong) Wong W K	20	21	21
(Japan) S Sasaki	12	21	15
2	(Indonesia) T Hidayat	21	10	21

Second Round
(England) R Ouseph	19	15
(Indonesia) S Santoso	21	21
(India) P Kashyap	16	13
3	(Denmark) P Gade	21	21
(Germany) M Zwiebler	9	12
6	(China) Lin D	21	21
Q3	(Hong Kong) Wong W K	21	18	17
2	(Indonesia) T Hidayat	19	21	21

Quarterfinals
(Indonesia) S Santoso	21	21
3	(Denmark) P Gade	17	16
6	(China) Lin D	21	8	21
2	(Indonesia) T Hidayat	13	21	15

Semifinals
(Indonesia) S Santoso	21	22	15
6	(China) Lin D	23	20	21

=== Finals ===
Semifinals
1	(Malaysia) Lee Chong Wei	21	21
(China) Du Pengyu	10	10
(Indonesia) Simon Santoso	21	22	15
6	(China) Lin Dan	23	20	21

Final
1	(Malaysia) Lee Chong Wei	19	21	16
6	(China) Lin Dan	21	14	21

== Women's singles ==
=== Seeds ===
1. (China) Wang Xin (quarter-finals)
2. (China) Wang Shixian (final)
3. (China) Wang Yihan (champion)
4. (India) Saina Nehwal (second round)
5. (Denmark) Tine Baun (quarter-finals)
6. (China) Jiang Yanjiao (quarter-finals)
7. (Germany) Juliane Schenk (second round)
8. (South Korea) Bae Yeon-ju (second round)

=== Top half ===
First Round
1	(China) Wang X	21	21
(Indonesia) M F Kusumastuti	11	13
(Malaysia) Wong M C	21	21
(China) Liu X	18	15
8	(South Korea) Bae Y-j	21	21
(Bulgaria) L Zetchiri	16	8
(South Korea) Sung J-h	21	21
Q1	(Hong Kong) Chan T K	8	8
3	(China) Wang YH	21	21
(Thailand) R Intanon	18	17
Q4	(Japan) A Kurihara	8	23
(China) Lu L	21	25
6	(China) Jiang YJ	21	21
(Netherlands) Yao J	19	15
(Bulgaria) P Nedelcheva	7	16
(Hong Kong) Yip P Y	21	21

Second Round
1	(China) Wang X	21	21
(Malaysia) Wong M C	16	9
8	(South Korea) Bae Y-j	22	17	10
(South Korea) Sung J-h	20	21	21
3	(China) Wang YH	21	21
(China) Lu L	16	16
6	(China) Jiang YJ	21	21
(Hong Kong) Yip P Y	12	11

Quarterfinals
1	(China) Wang X	21	9	19
(South Korea) Sung J-h	11	21	21
3	(China) Wang YH	21	21
6	(China) Jiang YJ	18	13

Semifinals
(South Korea) Sung J-h	5	21	18
3	(China) Wang YH	21	18	21

=== Bottom half ===
First Round
(Chinese Taipei) Cheng S-c	20	15
(Thailand) P Buranaprasertsuk	22	21
(South Korea) Bae S-h	15	9
7	(Germany) J Schenk	21	21
(Russia) E Diehl	10	17
(Japan) S Sato	21	21
(Chinese Taipei) Tai T-y	21	14	20
4	(India) S Nehwal	19	21	21
(Japan) E Hirose	21	21
Q2	(South Korea) Hwang H-y	18	13
(China) Li XR	19	18
5	(Denmark) T Baun	21	21
Q3	(Chinese Taipei) Pai H-m	14	21
(Japan) A Goto	21	23
(Thailand) S Ponsana	16	11
2	(China) Wang SX	21	21

Second Round
(Thailand) P Buranaprasertsuk	21	22	21
7	(Germany) J Schenk	16	24	15
(Japan) S Sato	17	21	21
4	(India) S Nehwal	21	19	11
(Japan) E Hirose	10	18
5	(Denmark) T Baun	21	21
(Japan) A Goto	19	12
2	(China) Wang SX	21	21

Quarterfinals
(Thailand) P Buranaprasertsuk	21	17	21
(Japan) S Sato	12	21	6
5	(Denmark) T Baun	15	21	22
2	(China) Wang SX	21	12	24

Semifinals
(Thailand) P Buranaprasertsuk	7	13
2	(China) Wang SX	21	21

=== Finals ===
Semifinals
(South Korea) Sung Ji-hyun	5	21	18
3	(China) Wang Yihan	21	18	21
(Thailand) Porntip Buranaprasertsuk	7	13
2	(China) Wang Shixian	21	21

Final
3	(China) Wang Yihan	21	21
2	(China) Wang Shixian	14	18

== Men's doubles ==
=== Seeds ===
1. (Denmark) Mathias Boe / Carsten Mogensen (final)
2. (Malaysia) Koo Kien Keat / Tan Boon Heong (semi-finals)
3. (Indonesia) Markis Kido / Hendra Setiawan (second round)
4. (South Korea) Ko Sung-hyun / Yoo Yeon-seong (semi-finals)
5. (China) Cai Yun / Fu Haifeng (second round)
6. (South Korea) Jung Jae-sung / Lee Yong-dae (champions)
7. (Chinese Taipei) Fang Chieh-min / Lee Sheng-mu (quarter-finals)
8. (Indonesia) Alvent Yulianto / Hendra Aprida Gunawan (second round)

=== Top half ===
First Round
1	(Denmark) M Boe (Denmark) C Mogensen	22	21
(Malaysia) Gan T C (Malaysia) Tan B S	20	15
(Japan) N Kawamae (Japan) S Satō	21	22
Q1	(Malaysia) M Z A Latif (Malaysia) Hoon T H	16	20
5	(China) Cai Y (China) Fu HF	21	21
PFQ	(Japan) H Endo (Japan) K Hayakawa	15	15
(China) Chai B (China) Guo ZD	14	17
(Denmark) M Conrad-Petersen (Denmark) J Rasmussen	21	21
4	(South Korea) Ko S-h (South Korea) Yoo Y-s	21	21
(Indonesia) L Hadiyanto (Indonesia) C Wijaya	14	18
(Indonesia) M Ahsan (Indonesia) B Septano	12	20
Q3	(Scotland) R Blair (Indonesia) F Limpele	21	22
7	(Chinese Taipei) Fang C-m (Chinese Taipei) Lee S-m	21	21
(Japan) H Hashimoto (Japan) N Hirata	10	13
(Malaysia) Goh V S (Malaysia) Teo K S	13	18
PFQ	(China) Liu XL (China) Qiu ZH	21	21

Second Round
1	(Denmark) M Boe (Denmark) C Mogensen	21	21
(Japan) N Kawamae (Japan) S Satō	10	10
5	(China) Cai Y (China) Fu HF	18	21	13
(Denmark) M Conrad-Petersen (Denmark) J Rasmussen	21	17	21
4	(South Korea) Ko S-h (South Korea) Yoo Y-s	18	21	21
Q3	(Scotland) R Blair (Indonesia) F Limpele	21	15	16
7	(Chinese Taipei) Fang C-m (Chinese Taipei) Lee S-m	21	19	21
PFQ	(China) Liu XL (China) Qiu ZH	18	21	11

Quarterfinals
1	(Denmark) M Boe (Denmark) C Mogensen	21	21
(Denmark) M Conrad-Petersen (Denmark) J Rasmussen	9	13
4	(South Korea) Ko S-h (South Korea) Yoo Y-s	21	10	21
7	(Chinese Taipei) Fang C-m (Chinese Taipei) Lee S-m	8	21	16

Semifinals
1	(Denmark) M Boe (Denmark) C Mogensen	21	21
4	(South Korea) Ko S-h (South Korea) Yoo Y-s	17	19

=== Bottom half ===
First Round
(England) C Adcock (England) A Ellis	21	21
(Japan) Y Hirobe (Japan) K Kazuno	17	18
(United States) H Bach (United States) T Gunawan	15	11
6	(South Korea) Jung J-s (South Korea) Lee Y-d	21	21
(China) Xu C (China) Zhang N	21	13	14
Q3	(South Korea) Kim G-j (South Korea) Kim S-r	14	21	21
(Thailand) S Anugritayawon (Thailand) S Prapakamol	16	15
3	(Indonesia) M Kido (Indonesia) H Setiawan	21	21
(Germany) I Kindervater (Germany) J Schöttler	13	21	18
(Malaysia) M F M Tazari (Malaysia) Ong S H	21	20	21
(Chinese Taipei) Chen H-l (Chinese Taipei) Lin Y-l	9	20
8	(Indonesia) A Yulianto (Indonesia) H A Gunawan	21	22
Q2	(China) Hong W (China) Shen Y	21	21
(Germany) M Fuchs (Germany) O Roth	12	8
(South Korea) Cho G-w (South Korea) Kwon Y-g	11	17
2	(Malaysia) Koo K K (Malaysia) Tan B H	21	21

Second Round
(England) C Adcock (England) A Ellis	12	10
6	(South Korea) Jung J-s (South Korea) Lee Y-d	21	21
Q3	(South Korea) Kim G-j (South Korea) Kim S-r	21	21
3	(Indonesia) M Kido (Indonesia) H Setiawan	18	18
(Malaysia) M F M Tazari (Malaysia) Ong S H	21	21
8	(Indonesia) A Yulianto (Indonesia) H A Gunawan	18	12
Q2	(China) Hong W (China) Shen Y	23	21	19
2	(Malaysia) Koo K K (Malaysia) Tan B H	25	11	21

Quarterfinals
6	(South Korea) Jung J-s (South Korea) Lee Y-d	21	21
Q3	(South Korea) Kim G-j (South Korea) Kim S-r	19	15
(Malaysia) M F M Tazari (Malaysia) Ong S H	17	21	16
2	(Malaysia) Koo K K (Malaysia) Tan B H	21	12	21

Semifinals
6	(South Korea) Jung J-s (South Korea) Lee Y-d	20	21	21
2	(Malaysia) Koo K K (Malaysia) Tan B H	22	9	10

=== Finals ===
Semifinals
1	(Denmark) Mathias Boe (Denmark) Carsten Mogensen	21	21
4	(South Korea) Ko Sung-hyun (South Korea) Yoo Yeon-seong	17	19
6	(South Korea) Jung Jae-sung (South Korea) Lee Yong-dae	20	21	21
2	(Malaysia) Koo Kien Keat (Malaysia) Tan Boon Heong	22	9	10

Final
1	(Denmark) Mathias Boe (Denmark) Carsten Mogensen	6	13
6	(South Korea) Jung Jae-sung (South Korea) Lee Yong-dae	21	21

== Women's doubles ==
=== Seeds ===
1. (Chinese Taipei) Cheng Wen-hsing / Chien Yu-chin (semi-finals)
2. (Japan) Miyuki Maeda / Satoko Suetsuna (quarter-finals)
3. (Russia) Valeria Sorokina / Nina Vislova (first round)
4. (Bulgaria) Petya Nedelcheva / (Russia) Anastasia Russkikh (first round)
5. (China) Du Jing / Pan Pan (semi-finals)
6. (China) Wang Xiaoli / Yu Yang (champions)
7. (China) Cheng Shu / Ma Jin (quarter-finals)
8. (China) Tian Qing / Zhao Yunlei (final)

=== Top half ===
First Round
1	(Chinese Taipei) Cheng W-h (Chinese Taipei) Chien Y-c	21	21
(Denmark) C Pedersen (Denmark) K Rytter Juhl	12	16
(Indonesia) M Jauhari (Indonesia) G Polii	14	16
Q4	(South Korea) Eom H-w (South Korea) Kim H-n	21	21
7	(China) Cheng S (China) Ma J	21	21
(England) J Wallwork (England) G White	13	6
(Japan) M Matsutomo (Japan) A Takahashi	20	21	21
(South Korea) Ha J-e (South Korea) Jung K-e	22	16	16
4	(Bulgaria) P Nedelcheva (Russia) A Russkikh	17	19
(Indonesia) V Marissa (Indonesia) N Melati	21	21
(United States) I Wang (United States) R Wang	19	12
Q2	(Hong Kong) Poon L Y (Hong Kong) Tse Y S	21	21
6	(China) Wang XL (China) Yu Y	21	21
(Japan) S Matsuo (Japan) M Naito	4	18
(Netherlands) L Jonathans (Netherlands) P van Dooremalen	16	11
(Thailand) D Aroonkesorn (Thailand) K Voravichitchaikul	21	21

Second Round
1	(Chinese Taipei) Cheng W-h (Chinese Taipei) Chien Y-c	21	21
Q4	(South Korea) Eom H-w (South Korea) Kim H-n	19	14
7	(China) Cheng S (China) Ma J	21	21
(Japan) M Matsutomo (Japan) A Takahashi	12	18
(Indonesia) V Marissa (Indonesia) N Melati	29	17	11
Q2	(Hong Kong) Poon L Y (Hong Kong) Tse Y S	27	21	21
6	(China) Wang XL (China) Yu Y	21	21
(Thailand) D Aroonkesorn (Thailand) K Voravichitchaikul	3	7

Quarterfinals
1	(Chinese Taipei) Cheng W-h (Chinese Taipei) Chien Y-c	22	13	23
7	(China) Cheng S (China) Ma J	20	21	21
Q2	(Hong Kong) Poon L Y (Hong Kong) Tse Y S	11	10
6	(China) Wang XL (China) Yu Y	21	21

Semifinals
1	(Chinese Taipei) Cheng W-h (Chinese Taipei) Chien Y-c	9	21	7
6	(China) Wang XL (China) Yu Y	21	17	21

=== Bottom half ===
First Round
(Indonesia) K Dewi (Indonesia) S R Andini	12	17
(Singapore) S M Sari (Singapore) Yao L	21	21
(South Korea) Kim M-s (South Korea) Yoo H-y	11	7
8	(China) Tian Q (China) Zhao YL	21	21
(Hong Kong) Chan T K (Hong Kong) Chau H W	21	20	20
(India) J Gutta (India) A Ponnappa	18	22	22
(Japan) M Fujii (Japan) R Kakiiwa	21	22
3	(Russia) V Sorokina (Russia) N Vislova	13	20
Q3	(Indonesia) L Nurlita (Thailand) S Thungthongkam	16	11
(South Korea) Chang Y-n (South Korea) Kim M-j	21	21
(Chinese Taipei) Hsien P-c (Chinese Taipei) Wang P-r	14	21	13
5	(China) Du J (China) Pan P	21	19	21
(Germany) S Marinello (Germany) B Michels	21	21
Q1	(South Korea) Kim C-m (South Korea) Park S-y	13	16
(Indonesia) A F Agustin (Indonesia) N K Maheswari	11	6
2	(Japan) M Maeda (Japan) S Suetsuna	21	21

Second Round
(Singapore) S M Sari (Singapore) Yao L	10	14
8	(China) Tian Q (China) Zhao YL	21	21
(India) J Gutta (India) A Ponnappa	21	14	21
(Japan) M Fujii (Japan) R Kakiiwa	18	21	15
(South Korea) Chang Y-n (South Korea) Kim M-j	18	21	12
5	(China) Du J (China) Pan P	21	15	21
(Germany) S Marinello (Germany) B Michels	13	13
2	(Japan) M Maeda (Japan) S Suetsuna	21	21

Quarterfinals
8	(China) Tian Q (China) Zhao YL	21	21
(India) J Gutta (India) A Ponnappa	16	15
5	(China) Du J (China) Pan P	19	21	21
2	(Japan) M Maeda (Japan) S Suetsuna	21	15	17

Semifinals
8	(China) Tian Q (China) Zhao YL	21	22
5	(China) Du J (China) Pan P	19	20

=== Finals ===
Semifinals
1	(Chinese Taipei) Cheng Wen-hsing (Chinese Taipei) Chien Yu-chin	9	21	7
6	(China) Wang Xiaoli (China) Yu Yang	21	17	21
8	(China) Tian Qing (China) Zhao Yunlei	21	22
5	(China) Du Jing (China) Pan Pan	19	20

Final
6	(China) Wang Xiaoli (China) Yu Yang	21	19	21
8	(China) Tian Qing (China) Zhao Yunlei	18	21	4

== Mixed doubles ==
=== Seeds ===
1. (Denmark) Thomas Laybourn / Kamilla Rytter Juhl (withdrew)
2. (Thailand) Sudket Prapakamol / Saralee Thungthongkam (second round)
3. (Poland) Robert Mateusiak / Nadieżda Zięba (first round)
4. (South Korea) Ko Sung-hyun / Ha Jung-eun (semi-finals)
5. (China) Zhang Nan / Zhao Yunlei (champions)
6. (China) Tao Jiaming / Tian Qing (final)
7. (Denmark) Joachim Fischer Nielsen / Christinna Pedersen (quarter-finals)
8. (China) He Hanbin / Yu Yang (quarter-finals)

=== Top half ===
First Round
PFQ	(Hong Kong) Wong W H (Hong Kong) Chau H W	20	21	13
(Indonesia) F Kurniawan (Indonesia) P Z Bernadet	22	18	21
(Indonesia) T Ahmad (Indonesia) L Natsir	21	21
(Ukraine) V Atrashchenkov (Ukraine) E Prus	13	12
5	(China) Zhang N (China) Zhao YL	21	21
(Indonesia) H Setiawan (Russia) A Russkikh	13	16
(Japan) K Hayakawa (Japan) S Matsuo	15	15
(Indonesia) M Rijal (Indonesia) D Susanto	21	21
3	(Poland) R Mateusiak (Poland) N Zięba	13	9
(China) Xu C (China) Ma J	21	21
Q1	(China) Hong W (China) Bao YX	11	11
Q3	(Scotland) R Blair (England) G White	21	21
8	(China) He HB (China) Yu Y	21	21
(Malaysia) Chan P S (Malaysia) Goh L Y	17	12
(Indonesia) M Kido (Indonesia) L Nurlita	14	21	18
Q2	(South Korea) Kim G-j (South Korea) Yoo H-y	21	19	21

Second Round
(Indonesia) F Kurniawan (Indonesia) P Z Bernadet	14	19
(Indonesia) T Ahmad (Indonesia) L Natsir	21	21
5	(China) Zhang N (China) Zhao YL	21	21
(Indonesia) M Rijal (Indonesia) D Susanto	10	6
(China) Xu C (China) Ma J	21	21
Q3	(Scotland) R Blair (England) G White	13	19
8	(China) He HB (China) Yu Y	21	21
Q2	(South Korea) Kim G-j (South Korea) Yoo H-y	9	10

Quarterfinals
(Indonesia) T Ahmad (Indonesia) L Natsir	18	21	20
5	(China) Zhang N (China) Zhao YL	21	19	22
(China) Xu C (China) Ma J	21	21
8	(China) He HB (China) Yu Y	13	13

Semifinals
5	(China) Zhang N (China) Zhao YL	21	21
(China) Xu C (China) Ma J	14	11

=== Bottom half ===
First Round
(Japan) H Hashimoto (Japan) M Fujii	21	16	16
(Indonesia) N Widianto (Indonesia) V Marissa	18	21	21
Q4	(Singapore) C Triyachart (Singapore) V Neo	9	3^{r}
7	(Denmark) J Fischer Nielsen (Denmark) C Pedersen	21	11
(Chinese Taipei) Lee S-m (Chinese Taipei) Chien Y-c	21	21
PFQ	(Chinese Taipei) Fang C-m (Chinese Taipei) Wang P-r	13	13
(Germany) M Fuchs (Germany) B Michels	21	16	11
4	(South Korea) Ko S-h (South Korea) Ha J-e	16	21	21
(India) V. Diju (India) J Gutta	21	21
(England) N Robertson (England) J Wallwork	19	18
(Japan) S Ikeda (Japan) R Shiota	23^{r}
6	(China) Tao JM (China) Tian Q	25
(Chinese Taipei) Chen H-l (Chinese Taipei) Cheng W-h	21	21
(Thailand) S Anugritayawon (Thailand) K Voravichitchaikul	16	9
(South Korea) Yoo Y-s (South Korea) Kim M-j	16	21	12
2	(Thailand) S Prapakamol (Thailand) S Thungthongkam	21	10	21

Second Round
(Indonesia) N Widianto (Indonesia) V Marissa	17	17
7	(Denmark) J Fischer Nielsen (Denmark) C Pedersen	21	21
(Chinese Taipei) Lee S-m (Chinese Taipei) Chien Y-c	21	14	10
4	(South Korea) Ko S-h (South Korea) Ha J-e	18	21	21
(India) V. Diju (India) J Gutta	16	13
6	(China) Tao JM (China) Tian Q	21	21
(Chinese Taipei) Chen H-l (Chinese Taipei) Cheng W-h	21	22	21
2	(Thailand) S Prapakamol (Thailand) S Thungthongkam	19	24	14

Quarterfinals
7	(Denmark) J Fischer Nielsen (Denmark) C Pedersen	21	18	18
4	(South Korea) Ko S-h (South Korea) Ha J-e	15	21	21
6	(China) Tao JM (China) Tian Q	21	19	21
(Chinese Taipei) Chen H-l (Chinese Taipei) Cheng W-h	18	21	14

Semifinals
4	(South Korea) Ko S-h (South Korea) Ha J-e	18	17
6	(China) Tao JM (China) Tian Q	21	21

=== Finals ===
Semifinals
5	(China) Zhang Nan (China) Zhao Yunlei	21	21
(China) Xu Chen (China) Ma Jin	14	11
4	(South Korea) Ko Sung-hyun (South Korea) Ha Jung-eun	18	17
6	(China) Tao Jiaming (China) Tian Qing	21	21

Final
5	(China) Zhang Nan (China) Zhao Yunlei	21	13	21
6	(China) Tao Jiaming (China) Tian Qing	17	21	19

Preceded by 2010 Korea Open Super Series	Korea Open	Succeeded by 2012 Korea Open Super Series Premier
Preceded by 2011 Malaysia Super Series	BWF Super Series; 2011 season	Succeeded by 2011 All England Super Series Premier
