= Henri Hurskainen =

Swedish badminton player (born 1986)

Personal information
- Born: Henri Mikael Hurskainen; 13 September 1986 (age 40) Emmaboda, Sweden
- Height: 1.85 m (6 ft 1 in)
- Weight: 80 kg (176 lb)

Sport
- Country: Sweden
- Sport: Badminton
- Handedness: Left

Men's singles
- Tournaments played: 428 (259 wins – 169 losses)
- Highest ranking: 34 (20 Nov 2014)
- Current ranking: 48 (16 March 2017)
- BWF profile
Medal record
Representing Sweden
European Badminton Championships
Silver medal – second place	2012 Karlskrona	Men's singles

Henri Mikael Hurskainen (born 13 September 1986) is a Swedish badminton player who competed for Sweden at the 2012 and 2016 Summer Olympics. Hurskainen has won several gold and silver medals in badminton championships. Hurskainen was born in Emmaboda, Sweden, to Finnish parents who had moved to Sweden in the 1980s.

== Achievements ==
=== European Championships ===
Men's Singles
Year	Venue	Opponent	Score	Result
2012	Telenor Arena; Karlskrona, Sweden	(Germany) Marc Zwiebler	15–21, 13–21	Silver

=== BWF Grand Prix ===
The BWF Grand Prix has two level such as Grand Prix and Grand Prix Gold. It is a series of badminton tournaments, sanctioned by Badminton World Federation (BWF) since 2007.

Men's Singles
Year	Tournament	Opponent	Score	Result
2013	Scottish Open	(France) Brice Leverdez	8–21, 21–16, 16–21	(silver) Silver

BWF Grand Prix Gold tournament
BWF Grand Prix tournament

=== BWF International Challenge/Series ===
Men's singles
Year	Tournament	Opponent	Score	Result
2016	Italian International	(Italy) Indra Bagus Ade Chandra	22–20, 21–13	(gold) Winner
2015	Kharkiv International	(England) Rhys Walker	21–9, 21–15	(gold) Winner
2014	Brazil International	(Cuba) Osleni Guerrero	11–6, 11–7, 11–6	(gold) Winner
2014	USA International	(Sweden) Mattias Borg	21–16, 21–11	(gold) Winner
2014	Swedish Masters	(Finland) Ville Lång	21–16, 14–21, 19–21	(silver) Runner-up
2012	Denmark International	(Denmark) Rune Ulsing	21–14, 21–11	(gold) Winner
2012	Finnish Open	(England) Rajiv Ouseph	18–21, 21–16, 18–21	(silver) Runner-up
2010	Norwegian International	(Denmark) Hans-Kristian Vittinghus	16–21, 21–19, 8–21	(silver) Runner-up
2009	Turkey International	(Finland) Ville Lång	14–21, 23–21, 19–21	(silver) Runner-up
2009	Irish International	(Denmark) Peter Mikkelsen	21–15, 13–21, 21–17	(gold) Winner
2008	Norwegian International	(Finland) Ville Lång	13–21, 8–21	(silver) Runner-up
2008	Spanish Open	(India) Chetan Anand	21–23, 21–19, 15–21	(silver) Runner-up

BWF International Challenge tournament
BWF International Series tournament
BWF Future Series tournament
