= 2012 European Badminton Championships =

Tournament details
- Dates: 16–21 April 2012
- Venue: Telenor Arena Karlskrona
- Location: Karlskrona, Sweden

Champions
- Men's singles: (Germany) Marc Zwiebler
- Women's singles: (Denmark) Tine Baun
- Men's doubles: (Denmark) Mathias Boe (Denmark) Carsten Mogensen
- Women's doubles: (Denmark) Christinna Pedersen (Denmark) Kamilla Rytter Juhl
- Mixed doubles: (Poland) Robert Mateusiak (Poland) Nadiezda Zieba

The 2012 European Badminton Championships were the 23rd tournament of the European Badminton Championships. They were held in Karlskrona, Sweden, from 16 to 21 April 2012, and they were organised by the Badminton Europe and Svenska Badmintonförbundet. The competitions were held in Telenor Arena.

== Medalists ==
Event	Gold	Silver	Bronze
Men's singles	Marc Zwiebler (GER)	Henri Hurskainen (SWE)	Viktor Axelsen (DEN)
Men's singles	Marc Zwiebler (GER)	Henri Hurskainen (SWE)	Jan Ø. Jørgensen (DEN)
Women's singles	Tine Baun (DEN)	Juliane Schenk (GER)	Linda Zechiri (BUL)
Women's singles	Tine Baun (DEN)	Juliane Schenk (GER)	Jie Yao (NED)
Men's doubles	Mathias Boe (DEN); Carsten Mogensen (DEN)	Michael Fuchs (GER); Oliver Roth (GER)	Chris Adcock (ENG); Andrew Ellis (ENG)
Men's doubles	Mathias Boe (DEN); Carsten Mogensen (DEN)	Michael Fuchs (GER); Oliver Roth (GER)	Rasmus Bonde (DEN); Anders Kristiansen (DEN)
Women's doubles	Christinna Pedersen (DEN); Kamilla Rytter Juhl (DEN)	Line Damkjær Kruse (DEN); Marie Røpke (DEN)	Sandra Marinello (GER); Birgit Michels (GER)
Women's doubles	Christinna Pedersen (DEN); Kamilla Rytter Juhl (DEN)	Line Damkjær Kruse (DEN); Marie Røpke (DEN)	Valeria Sorokina (RUS); Nina Vislova (RUS)
Mixed doubles	Robert Mateusiak (POL); Nadiezda Zieba (POL)	Mads Pieler Kolding (DEN); Julie Houmann (DEN)	Chris Adcock (ENG); Imogen Bankier (SCO)
Mixed doubles	Robert Mateusiak (POL); Nadiezda Zieba (POL)	Mads Pieler Kolding (DEN); Julie Houmann (DEN)	Thomas Laybourn (DEN); Kamilla Rytter Juhl (DEN)

== Results ==
=== Men's singles ===
Quarterfinals
1	(Denmark) Peter Gade	19	21	19
(Sweden) Henri Hurskainen	21	12	21
(Germany) Dieter Domke	17	14
7	(Denmark) Viktor Axelsen	21	21
6	(England) Rajiv Ouseph	15	19
4	(Germany) Marc Zwiebler	21	21
(Sweden) Mattias Wigardt	15	11
2	(Denmark) Jan Ø. Jørgensen	21	21

Semifinals
(Sweden) Henri Hurskainen	18	21	21
7	(Denmark) Viktor Axelsen	21	18	17
4	(Germany) Marc Zwiebler	21	21
2	(Denmark) Jan Ø. Jørgensen	19	15

Finals
(Sweden) Henri Hurskainen	15	13
4	(Germany) Marc Zwiebler	21	21

=== Women's singles ===
Quarterfinals
1	(Denmark) Tine Baun	21	11	21
6	(Spain) Carolina Marín	7	21	18
(Czech Republic) Kristina Gavnholt	18	18
7	(Bulgaria) Linda Zechiri	21	21
5	(Netherlands) Jie Yao	18	22	21
3	(Bulgaria) Petya Nedelcheva	21	20	14
(Switzerland) Sabrina Jaquet	18	15
2	(Germany) Juliane Schenk	21	21

Semifinals
1	(Denmark) Tine Baun	21	21
7	(Bulgaria) Linda Zechiri	13	14
5	(Netherlands) Jie Yao	13	10
2	(Germany) Juliane Schenk	21	21

Finals
1	(Denmark) Tine Baun	21	16	21
2	(Germany) Juliane Schenk	19	21	19

=== Men's doubles ===
Quarterfinals
1	(Denmark) Boe/Mogensen	21	21
5	(Russia) Ivanov/Sozonov	13	15
3	(Germany) Kindervater/Schöttler	17	21	19
6	(England) Adcock/Ellis	21	16	21
7	(Germany) Fuchs/Roth	21	13	23
4	(Poland) Cwalina/Logosz	16	21	21
(France) Quere/Labar	13	14
(Denmark) Bonde/Kristiansen	21	21

Semifinals
1	(Denmark) Boe/Mogensen	21	21
6	(England) Adcock/Ellis	11	14
7	(Germany) Fuchs/Roth	21	17	21
(Denmark) Bonde/Kristiansen	18	21	14

Finals
1	(Denmark) Boe/Mogensen	21	21
7	(Germany) Fuchs/Roth	11	11

=== Women's doubles ===
Quarterfinals
1	(Denmark) Pedersen/Rytter Juhl	21	21
(Netherlands) Piek/Tabeling	8	7
4	(Germany) Marinello/Michels	23	21
7	(Sweden) Lenartsson/Wengberg	21	11
(Poland) Augustyn/Wojtkowska	14	15
3	(Denmark) Kruse/Røpke	21	21
6	(England) Agathangelou/Olver	22	16	13
2	(Russia) Sorokina/Vislova	20	21	21

Semifinals
1	(Denmark) Pedersen/Rytter Juhl	21	21
4	(Germany) Marinello/Michels	11	11
3	(Denmark) Kruse/Røpke	22	13	21
2	(Russia) Sorokina/Vislova	20	21	12

Finals
1	(Denmark) Pedersen/Rytter Juhl	22	13	21
3	(Denmark) Kruse/Røpke	20	21	12

=== Mixed doubles ===
Quarterfinals
1	(Denmark) Nielsen/Pedersen	17	10
7	(Poland) Mateusiak/Zieba	21	21
4	(England) (Scotland) Adcock/Bankier	18	21	22
6	(England) Robertson/Wallwork	21	19	20
8	(Denmark) Kolding/Houmann	21	19	21
3	(Russia) Nikolaenko/Sorokina	19	21	10
5	(Germany) Fuchs/Michels	18	14
2	(Denmark) Laybourn/Rytter Juhl	21	21

Semifinals
7	(Poland) Mateusiak/Zieba	21	17	21
4	(England) (Scotland) Adcock/Bankier	17	21	19
8	(Denmark) Kolding/Houmann	16	21	21
2	(Denmark) Laybourn/Rytter Juhl	21	19	18

Finals
7	(Poland) Mateusiak/Zieba	21	24
8	(Denmark) Kolding/Houmann	12	22

== Medal table ==
Rank	Nation	Gold	Silver	Bronze	Total
1	Denmark	3	2	4	9
2	Germany	1	2	1	4
3	Poland	1	0	0	1
4	Sweden	0	1	0	1
5	England	0	0	1.5	1.5
6	Bulgaria	0	0	1	1
6	Netherlands	0	0	1	1
6	Russia	0	0	1	1
9	Scotland	0	0	0.5	0.5
Totals (9 entries)		5	5	10	20
