= Andrew Ellis (badminton) =

English badminton player (born 1987)

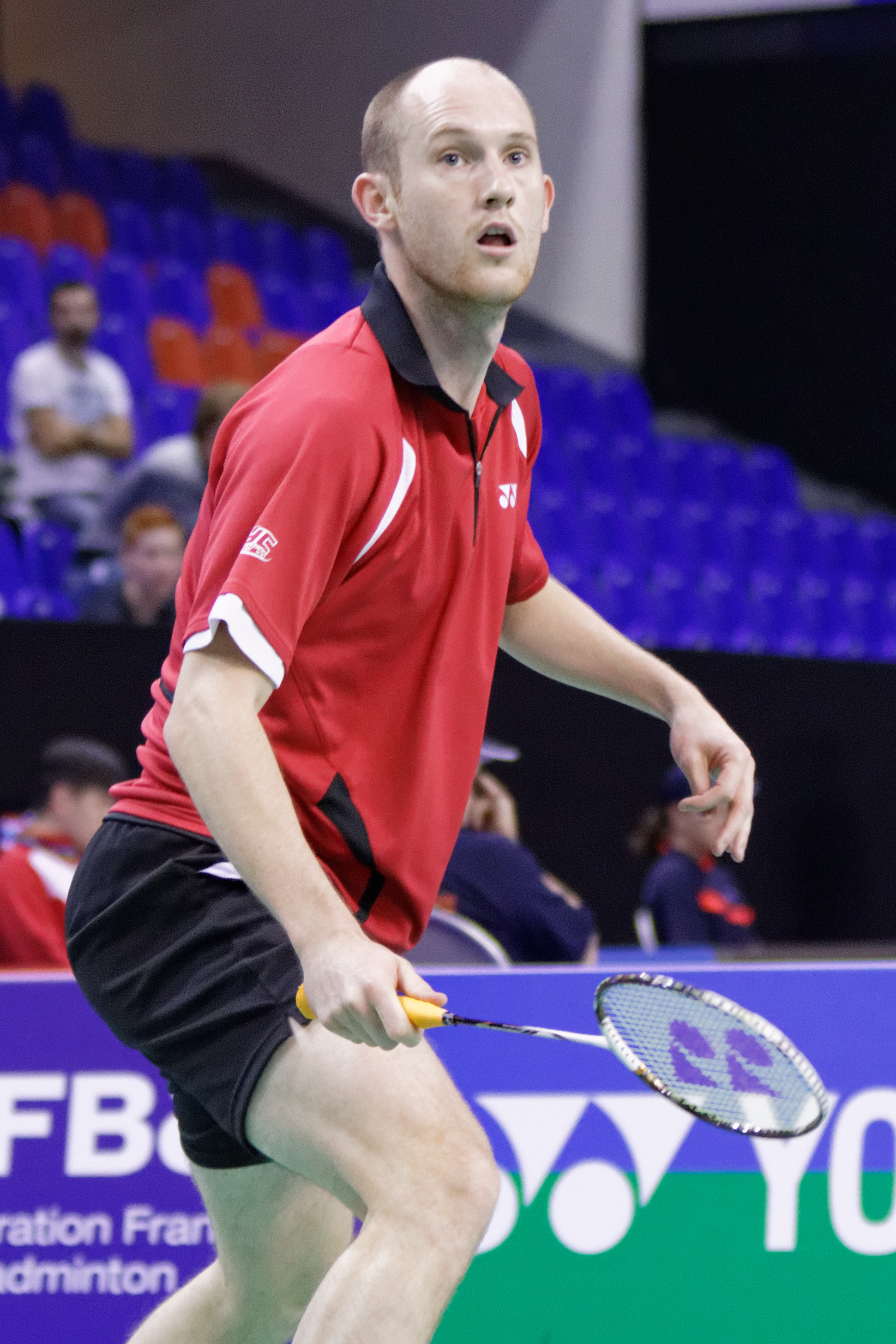
- Andrew Ellis at the 2013 French Super Series

Personal information
- Born: 21 January 1987 (age 39) Leeds, England
- Height: 1.87 m (6 ft 2 in)
- Weight: 78 kg (172 lb)

Sport
- Country: England
- Sport: Badminton
- Handedness: Right

Men's & mixed doubles
- Highest ranking: 9 (MD) 22 May 2014; 58 (XD) 28 November 2013
- BWF profile
Medal record
Men's badminton
Representing England
Commonwealth Games
Silver medal – second place	2014 Glasgow	Mixed team
European Championships
Bronze medal – third place	2014 Kazan	Men's doubles
Bronze medal – third place	2012 Karlskrona	Men's doubles
European Mixed Team Championships
Silver medal – second place	2015 Leuven	Mixed team
Bronze medal – third place	2013 Moscow	Mixed team
European Men's Team Championships
Silver medal – second place	2014 Basel	Men's team
Bronze medal – third place	2012 Amsterdam	Men's team
Commonwealth Youth Games
Bronze medal – third place	2004 Bendigo	Mixed team

Andrew Ellis (born 21 January 1987) is an English badminton player who specializes in doubles. He won the European individual bronze medals with Chris Adcock in 2012 and 2014. Ellis reached top 10 BWF ranking in the men's doubles event with Adcock in November 2013. He competed for England in the men's doubles and mixed team events at the 2014 Commonwealth Games where he won a silver medal in the team event.

== Achievements ==
=== European Championships ===
Men's Doubles
Year	Venue	Partner	Opponent	Score	Result
2014	Gymnastics Center; Kazan, Russia	(England) Chris Adcock	(Denmark) Mads Conrad-Petersen (Denmark) Mads Pieler Kolding	16–21, 21–19, 8–21	Bronze
2012	Telenor Arena; Karlskrona, Sweden	(England) Chris Adcock	(Denmark) Mathias Boe (Denmark) Carsten Mogensen	11–21, 14–21	Bronze

=== BWF Grand Prix ===
The BWF Grand Prix has two level such as Grand Prix and Grand Prix Gold. It is a series of badminton tournaments, sanctioned by Badminton World Federation (BWF) since 2007.

Men's Doubles
Year	Tournament	Partner	Opponent	Score	Result
2015	Scottish Open	(England) Peter Mills	(Germany) Michael Fuchs (Germany) Johannes Schöttler	15–21, 18–21	(silver) Runner-up
2009	Bitburger Open	(England) Chris Adcock	(India) Rupesh Kumar (India) Sanave Thomas	21–17, 20–22, 22–24	(silver) Runner-up

BWF Grand Prix Gold tournament
BWF Grand Prix tournament

=== BWF International Challenge/Series ===
Men's Doubles
Year	Tournament	Partner	Opponent	Score	Result
2015	Finnish Open	(England) Peter Mills	(Denmark) Mathias Christiansen (Denmark) David Daugaard	21–19, 21–12	(gold) Winner
2010	Irish International	(England) Chris Adcock	(England) Anthony Clark (England) Chris Langridge	21–13, 21–16	(gold) Winner
2010	Scottish International	(England) Chris Adcock	(England) Marcus Ellis (England) Peter Mills	19–21, 21–11, 15–21	(silver) Runner-up
2010	Austrian International	(England) Dean George	(Indonesia) Viki Indra Okvana (Indonesia) Ardiansyah Putra	17–21, 23–21, 26–28	(silver) Runner-up
2008	Scottish International	(England) Richard Eidestedt	(England) Chris Langridge (England) David Lindley	21–19, 16–21, 21–16	(gold) Winner
2008	Le Volant d'Or de Toulouse	(England) Richard Eidestedt	(Belgium) Wouter Claes (Belgium) Frédéric Mawet	21–12, 21–12	(gold) Winner
2008	Irish International	(England) Richard Eidestedt	(Denmark) Martin Delfs (Denmark) Morten Kronborg	21–13, 21–16	(gold) Winner
2006	Welsh International	(England) Richard Eidestedt	(Wales) Matthew Hughes (Wales) Martyn Lewis	9–21, 16–21	(silver) Runner-up
2005	Welsh International	(England) Dean George	(England) Edward Foster (England) Matthew Honey	15–12, 13–15, 15–5	(gold) Winner

Mixed Doubles
Year	Tournament	Partner	Opponent	Score	Result
2012	Polish International	(England) Jenny Wallwork	(Poland) Wojciech Szkudlarczyk (Poland) Agnieszka Wojtkowska	21–13, 21–12	(gold) Winner

BWF International Challenge tournament
BWF International Series tournament
