= Oliver Roth (badminton) =

German badminton player (born 1986)

Personal information
- Born: 1 June 1986 (age 40) Munich, Germany

Sport
- Country: Germany
- Sport: Badminton

Men's Doubles & Mixed Doubles
- Highest ranking: 22 (MD) 22 Jan 2012; 81 (XD) 5 Sep 2013
- BWF profile
Medal record
Badminton
Representing Germany
European Championships
Silver medal – second place	2012 Karlskrona	Men's doubles
European Mixed Team Championships
Gold medal – first place	2013 Moscow	Mixed team
Silver medal – second place	2011 Amsterdam	Mixed team
European Men's Team Championships
Silver medal – second place	2012 Amsterdam	Men's team
Bronze medal – third place	2010 Warsaw	Men's team

Oliver Roth (born 1 June 1986) is a German male badminton player. In 2012, he won silver medal at the European Badminton Championships in men's doubles event with his partner Michael Fuchs.

== Achievements ==
=== European Championships ===
Men's doubles
Year	Venue	Partner	Opponent	Score	Result
2012	Telenor Arena; Karlskrona, Sweden	(Germany) Michael Fuchs	(Denmark) Mathias Boe (Denmark) Carsten Mogensen	11–21, 11–21	Silver

=== BWF International Challenge/Series ===
Men's doubles
Year	Tournament	Partner	Opponent	Score	Result
2011	Morocco International	(Germany) Michael Fuchs	(Germany) Ingo Kindervater (Germany) Johannes Schöttler	15–21, 19–21	(silver) Runner-up
2010	Belgian International	(Germany) Michael Fuchs	(Germany) Ingo Kindervater (Germany) Johannes Schöttler	Walkover	(silver) Runner-up
2010	Spanish International	(Germany) Peter Käsbauer	(Netherlands) Ruud Bosch (Netherlands) Koen Ridder	21–13, 21–14	(gold) Winner
2009	Welsh International	(Germany) Peter Käsbauer	(Russia) Vitalij Durkin (Russia) Alexander Nikolaenko	18–21, 18–21	(silver) Runner-up

BWF International Challenge tournament
BWF International Series tournament
BWF Future Series tournament
