= Sandra Marinello =

German badminton player (born 1983)

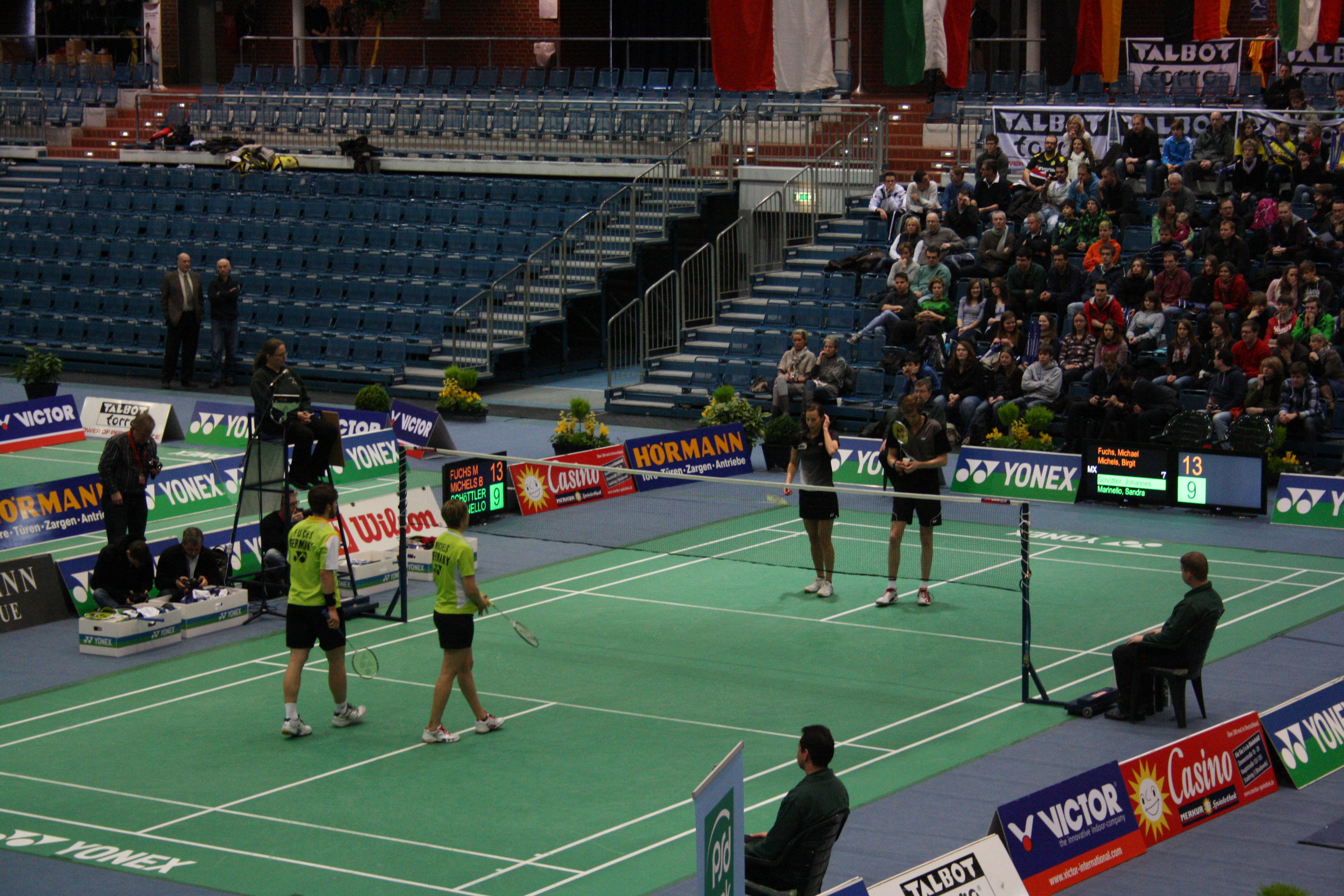

Personal information
- Born: 29 May 1983 (age 43) Duisburg, Germany
- Height: 1.77 m (5 ft 10 in)

Sport
- Country: Germany
- Sport: Badminton
- Handedness: Right

Women's & mixed doubles
- Highest ranking: 13 (WD, 26 May 2011); 28 (XD, 2 December 2010)
- BWF profile
Medal record
Women's badminton
Representing Germany
Uber Cup
Bronze medal – third place	2006 Sendai & Tokyo	Women's team
European Championships
Bronze medal – third place	2012 Karlskrona	Women's doubles
European Mixed Team Championships
Silver medal – second place	2011 Amsterdam	Mixed team
European Women's Team Championships
Gold medal – first place	2012 Amsterdam	Women's team
European Junior Championships
Gold medal – first place	2001 Spała	Mixed team

Sandra Marinello (born 29 May 1983) is a German badminton player. She was born in Duisburg, and started playing badminton in 1995. Marinello was part of the 1. BC Düren from 2008 to 2014, and previously played for the SV Thomasstadt Kempen, BV RW Wesel, TV Remscheid, SCU Lüdinghausen, PSV Ludwigshafen, and BV Gifhorn. She won the women's doubles title at the national championships from 2009 to 2012, partnered with Birgit Overzier. Together with the German national women's team, she won the bronze medal at the 2006 Uber Cup in Japan. She also won the women's doubles bronze at the 2012 European Championships with Overzier.

== Achievements ==
=== European Championships ===
Women's doubles
Year	Venue	Partner	Opponent	Score	Result
2012	Telenor Arena; Karlskrona, Sweden	(Germany) Birgit Overzier	(Denmark) Christinna Pedersen (Denmark) Kamilla Rytter Juhl	11–21, 11–21	Bronze

=== BWF Grand Prix ===
The BWF Grand Prix has two levels: Grand Prix and Grand Prix Gold. It is a series of badminton tournaments, sanctioned by the Badminton World Federation (BWF) since 2007.

Women's doubles
Year	Tournament	Partner	Opponent	Score	Result
2010	Canada Open	(Germany) Birgit Overzier	(Chinese Taipei) Cheng Wen-hsing (Chinese Taipei) Chien Yu-chin	16–21, 21–18, 17–21	(silver) Runner-up
2009	Dutch Open	(Germany) Birgit Overzier	(Russia) Valeria Sorokina (Russia) Nina Vislova	13–21, 17–21	(silver) Runner-up

BWF Grand Prix Gold tournament
BWF Grand Prix tournament

=== BWF International Challenge/Series ===
Women's doubles
Year	Tournament	Partner	Opponent	Score	Result
2011	Turkey International	(Germany) Birgit Overzier	(South Korea) Choi A-reum (South Korea) Yoo Hyun-young	21–18, 18–21, 24–22	(gold) Winner
2011	Italian International	(Germany) Birgit Overzier	(Russia) Valeria Sorokina (Russia) Nina Vislova	14–21, 9–21	(silver) Runner-up
2011	Kharkiv International	(Germany) Birgit Overzier	(Singapore) Shinta Mulia Sari (Singapore) Yao Lei	17–21, 21–18, 15–21	(silver) Runner-up
2011	Morocco International	(Germany) Birgit Overzier	(Sweden) Emelie Lennartsson (Sweden) Emma Wengberg	21–16, 21–16	(gold) Winner
2010	Norwegian International	(Germany) Birgit Overzier	(Netherlands) Lotte Jonathans (Netherlands) Paulien van Dooremalen	14–21, 15–21	(silver) Runner-up
2010	Belgian International	(Germany) Birgit Overzier	(Netherlands) Lotte Jonathans (Netherlands) Paulien van Dooremalen	21–19, 18–21, 21–12	(gold) Winner
2009	Dutch International	(Germany) Birgit Overzier	(Denmark) Line Damkjær Kruse (Denmark) Mie Schjøtt-Kristensen	19–21, 18–21	(silver) Runner-up
2009	Finnish International	(Germany) Birgit Overzier	(Russia) Valeria Sorokina (Russia) Nina Vislova	21–16, 12–21, 13–21	(silver) Runner-up
2006	Austrian International	(Germany) Kathrin Piotrowski	(Switzerland) Cynthia Tuwankotta (Indonesia) Atu Rosalina	21–11, 19–21, 17–21	(silver) Runner-up
2005	Finnish International	(Germany) Kathrin Piotrowski	(Netherlands) Brenda Beenhakker (Netherlands) Paulien van Dooremalen	15–11, 15–1	(gold) Winner
2005	Portugal International	(Germany) Kathrin Piotrowski	(Bulgaria) Petya Nedelcheva (Scotland) Yuan Wemyss	8–15, 15–11, 15–2	(gold) Winner

Mixed doubles
Year	Tournament	Partner	Opponent	Score	Result
2010	Belgian International	(Germany) Johannes Schöttler	(Germany) Michael Fuchs (Germany) Birgit Overzier	20–22, 19–21	(silver) Runner-up
2006	Austrian International	(Germany) Tim Dettmann	(Germany) Ingo Kindervater (Germany) Kathrin Piotrowski	17–21, 20–22	(silver) Runner-up

BWF International Challenge tournament
BWF International Series tournament
