= Birgit Michels =

German badminton player (born 1984)

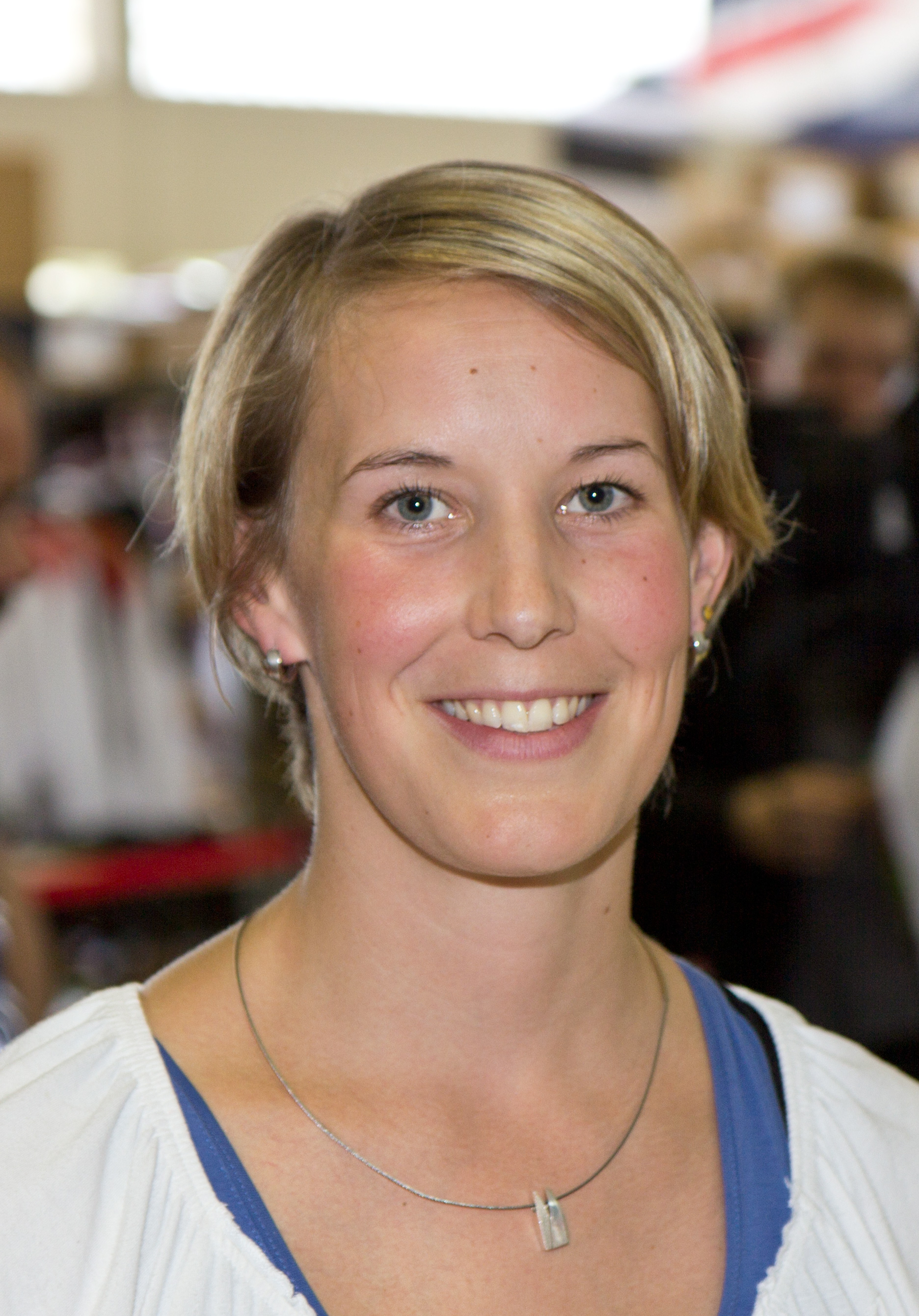

Personal information
- Born: Birgit Overzier; 28 September 1984 (age 42) Köln, West Germany
- Height: 1.78 m (5 ft 10 in)

Sport
- Country: Germany
- Sport: Badminton
- Handedness: Right
- Highest ranking: 13 (WD), 6 (XD)
- BWF profile
Medal record
Women's badminton
Representing Germany
Uber Cup
Bronze medal – third place	2008 Jakarta	Women's team
European Championships
Bronze medal – third place	2012 Karlskrona	Women's doubles
European Mixed Team Championships
Gold medal – first place	2013 Moscow	Mixed team
Silver medal – second place	2011 Amsterdam	Mixed team
Bronze medal – third place	2015 Leuven	Mixed team
European Women's Team Championships
Gold medal – first place	2012 Amsterdam	Women's team
Bronze medal – third place	2006 Thessalonica	Women's team
Bronze medal – third place	2008 Almere	Women's team
Bronze medal – third place	2010 Warsaw	Women's team
Bronze medal – third place	2014 Basel	Women's team
Bronze medal – third place	2016 Kazan	Women's team
European Junior Championships
Gold medal – first place	2001 Spała	Mixed team
Gold medal – first place	2003 Esbjerg	Mixed doubles
Gold medal – first place	2003 Esbjerg	Mixed team
Silver medal – second place	2003 Esbjerg	Girls' doubles
Bronze medal – third place	2001 Spała	Mixed doubles

Birgit Michels (née Overzier; born 28 September 1984) is a German badminton player. She competed for Germany at the 2008 and 2012 Summer Olympics in the mixed doubles. In 2008, she competed with Kristof Hopp, and in 2012 she competed with Michael Fuchs, reaching the quarter-finals.

== Achievements ==
=== European Championships ===
Women's doubles
Year	Venue	Partner	Opponent	Score	Result
2012	Telenor Arena, Karlskrona, Sweden	(Germany) Sandra Marinello	(Denmark) Christinna Pedersen (Denmark) Kamilla Rytter Juhl	11–21, 11–21	Bronze

=== European Junior Championships ===
Girls' doubles
Year	Venue	Partner	Opponent	Score	Result
2003	Esbjerg Badminton Center, Esbjerg, Denmark	(Germany) Therésè Nawrath	(Russia) Valeria Sorokina (Russia) Nina Vislova	11–5, 5–11, 0–11	Silver

Mixed doubles
Year	Venue	Partner	Opponent	Score	Result
2001	Spała Olympic Center, Spała, Poland	(Germany) Marc Zwiebler	(Denmark) Carsten Mogensen (Denmark) Kamilla Rytter Juhl	6–15, 15–12, 6–15	Bronze
2003	Esbjerg Badminton Center, Esbjerg, Denmark	(Germany) Marc Zwiebler	(Russia) Dmitri Pankov (Russia) Nina Vislova	11–7, 11–1	Gold

=== BWF Superseries ===
The BWF Superseries, which was launched on 14 December 2006 and implemented in 2007, was a series of elite badminton tournaments, sanctioned by the Badminton World Federation (BWF). BWF Superseries levels were Superseries and Superseries Premier. A season of Superseries consisted of twelve tournaments around the world that had been introduced since 2011. Successful players were invited to the Superseries Finals, which were held at the end of each year.

Mixed doubles
Year	Tournament	Partner	Opponent	Score	Result
2010	French Open	(Germany) Michael Fuchs	(Thailand) Sudket Prapakamol (Thailand) Saralee Thungthongkam	15–21, 15–21	(silver) Runner-up
2014	Japan Open	(Germany) Michael Fuchs	(China) Zhang Nan (China) Zhao Yunlei	12–21, 16–21	(silver) Runner-up
2014	Australian Open	(Germany) Michael Fuchs	(South Korea) Ko Sung-hyun (South Korea) Kim Ha-na	16–21, 17–21	(silver) Runner-up

BWF Super Series Premier tournament
BWF Super Series tournament

=== BWF Grand Prix ===
The BWF Grand Prix had two levels, the Grand Prix and Grand Prix Gold. It was a series of badminton tournaments sanctioned by the Badminton World Federation (BWF) and played between 2007 and 2017.

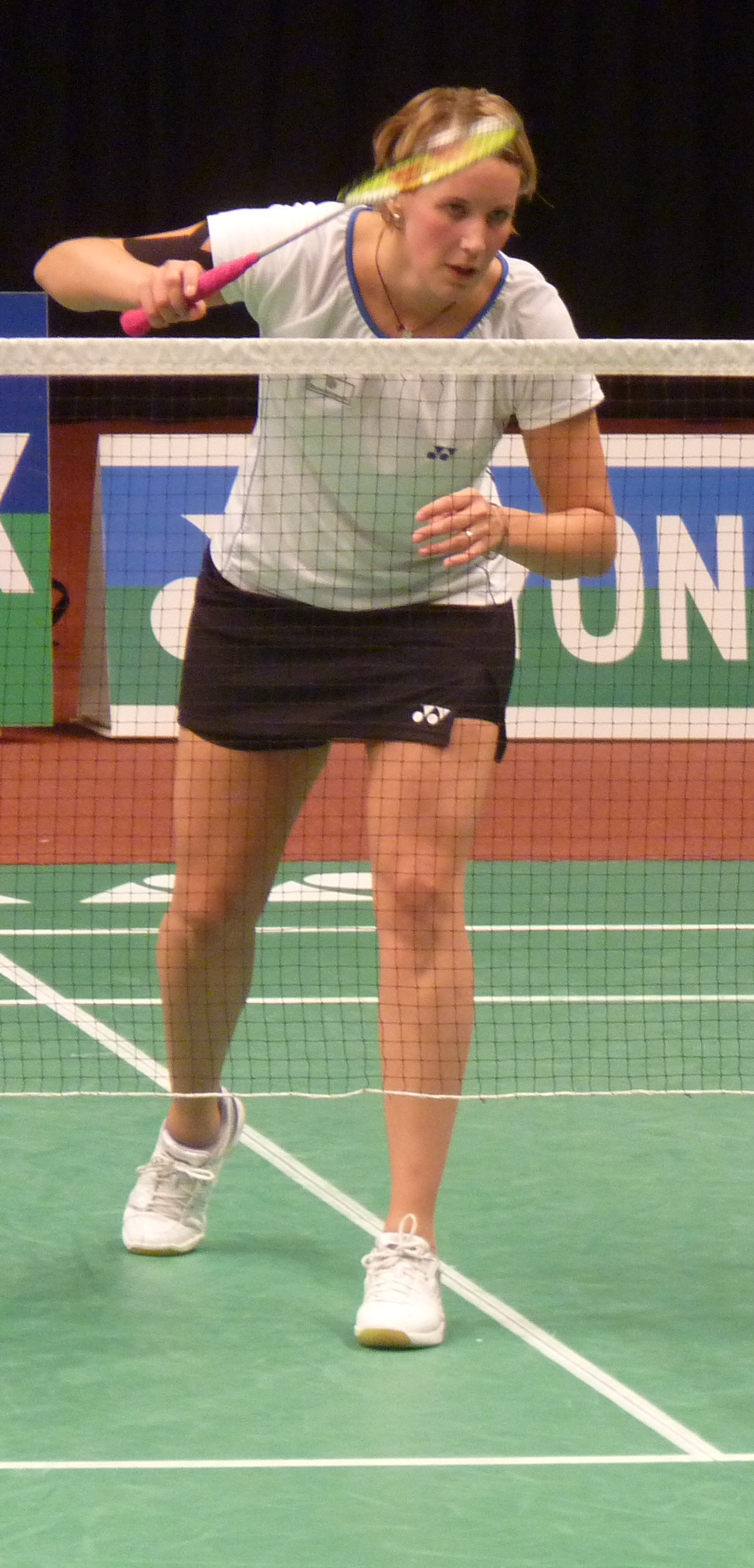
Michels at 2010 Dutch Open

Women's doubles
Year	Tournament	Partner	Opponent	Score	Result
2009	Dutch Open	(Germany) Sandra Marinello	(Russia) Valeria Sorokina (Russia) Nina Vislova	13–21, 17–21	(silver) Runner up
2010	Canada Open	(Germany) Sandra Marinello	(Chinese Taipei) Cheng Wen-hsing (Chinese Taipei) Chien Yu-chin	16–21, 21–18, 17–21	(silver) Runner up
2012	Bitburger Open	(Germany) Johanna Goliszewski	(Macau) Wang Rong (Macau) Zhang Zhibo	15–21, 13–21	(silver) Runner up

Mixed doubles
Year	Tournament	Partner	Opponent	Score	Result
2007	Bitburger Open	(Germany) Kristof Hopp	(England) Robert Blair (Scotland) Imogen Bankier	21–17, 21–17	(gold) Winner
2008	India Open	(Germany) Kristof Hopp	(China) He Hanbin (China) Yu Yang	18–21, 9–21	(silver) Runner-up
2010	U.S. Open	(Germany) Michael Fuchs	(Chinese Taipei) Lee Sheng-mu (Chinese Taipei) Chien Yu-chin	21–19, 21–14	(gold) Winner
2010	Bitburger Open	(Germany) Michael Fuchs	(China) Zhang Nan (China) Zhao Yunlei	20–22, 9–21	(silver) Runner-up
2011	Canada Open	(Germany) Michael Fuchs	(Chinese Taipei) Chen Hung-ling (Chinese Taipei) Cheng Wen-hsing	21–10, 23–21	(gold) Winner
2013	London Grand Prix Gold	(Germany) Michael Fuchs	(England) Chris Langridge (England) Heather Olver	21–19, 21–14	(gold) Winner
2013	Bitburger Open	(Germany) Michael Fuchs	(England) Chris Adcock (England) Gabrielle White	21–19, 21–15	(gold) Winner
2015	U.S. Grand Prix	(Germany) Michael Fuchs	(South Korea) Choi Sol-gyu (South Korea) Eom Hye-won	12–21, 14–21	(silver) Runner up

BWF Grand Prix Gold tournament
BWF Grand Prix tournament

=== BWF International Challenge/Series ===
Women's doubles
Year	Tournament	Partner	Opponent	Score	Result
2005	Belgian International	(Germany) Michaela Peiffer	(Germany) Juliane Schenk (Germany) Nicole Grether	6–15, 1–15	(silver) Runner-up
2005	Polish International	(Germany) Michaela Peiffer	(Poland) Kamila Augustyn (Poland) Nadieżda Kostiuczyk	13–15, 6–15	(silver) Runner-up
2006	Spanish International	(Germany) Carina Mette	(Denmark) Julie Houmann (Denmark) Mette Nielsen	21–17, 12–21, 26–24	(gold) Winner
2009	Finnish International	(Germany) Sandra Marinello	(Russia) Valeria Sorokina (Russia) Nina Vislova	21–16, 12–21, 13–21	(silver) Runner-up
2009	Dutch International	(Germany) Sandra Marinello	(Denmark) Line Damkjær Kruse (Denmark) Mie Schjøtt-Kristensen	19–21, 18–21	(silver) Runner-up
2010	Belgian International	(Germany) Sandra Marinello	(Netherlands) Lotte Jonathans (Netherlands) Paulien van Dooremalen	21–19, 18–21, 21–12	(gold) Winner
2010	Norwegian International	(Germany) Sandra Marinello	(Netherlands) Lotte Jonathans (Netherlands) Paulien van Dooremalen	14–21, 15–21	(silver) Runner-up
2011	Morocco International	(Germany) Sandra Marinello	(Sweden) Emelie Lennartsson (Sweden) Emma Wengberg	21–16, 21–16	(gold) Winner
2011	Kharkiv International	(Germany) Sandra Marinello	(Singapore) Shinta Mulia Sari (Singapore) Yao Lei	17–21, 21–18, 15–21	(silver) Runner-up
2011	Italian International	(Germany) Sandra Marinello	(Russia) Valeria Sorokina (Russia) Nina Vislova	14–21, 9–21	(silver) Runner-up
2011	Turkey International	(Germany) Sandra Marinello	(South Korea) Choi A-reum (South Korea) Yoo Hyun-young	21–13, 21–9	(gold) Winner
2015	Czech Open	(Germany) Isabel Herttrich	(France) Marie Batomene (France) Émilie Lefel	21–13, 21–9	(gold) Winner
2017	Dutch International	(Germany) Cisita Joity Jansen	(Netherlands) Debora Jille (Netherlands) Imke van der Aar	21–18, 21–18	(gold) Winner

Mixed doubles
Year	Tournament	Partner	Opponent	Score	Result
2004	Scottish International	(Germany) Jochen Cassel	(Sweden) Fredrik Bergström (Sweden) Johanna Persson	3–15, 13–15	(silver) Runner-up
2005	Norwegian International	(Germany) Kristof Hopp	(Denmark) Søren Frandsen (Denmark) Line Reimers	15–13, 15–7	(gold) Winner
2005	Belgian International	(Germany) Kristof Hopp	(Germany) Tim Dettmann (Germany) Annekatrin Lillie	15–4, 17–14	(gold) Winner
2005	Finnish International	(Germany) Jochen Cassel	(Poland) Robert Mateusiak (Poland) Nadieżda Kostiuczyk	4–15, 5–15	(silver) Runner-up
2007	Le Volant d'Or de Toulouse	(Germany) Kristof Hopp	(Germany) Ingo Kindervater (Germany) Kathrin Piotrowski	12–21, 21–16, 14–21	(silver) Runner-up
2007	Turkey International	(Germany) Kristof Hopp	(Germany) Ingo Kindervater (Germany) Kathrin Piotrowski	18–21, 15–21	(silver) Runner-up
2007	Norwegian International	(Germany) Kristof Hopp	(Russia) Vitalij Durkin (Russia) Valeria Sorokina	21–15, 13–21, 21–15	(gold) Winner
2008	Italian International	(Germany) Johannes Schöttler	(Russia) Vitalij Durkin (Russia) Nina Vislova	22–20, 19–21, 18–21	(silver) Runner-up
2009	Dutch International	(Germany) Johannes Schöttler	(Denmark) Christian John Skovgaard (Denmark) Anne Skelbæk	21–16, 21–10	(gold) Winner
2010	Belgian International	(Germany) Michael Fuchs	(Germany) Johannes Schöttler (Germany) Sandra Marinello	22–20, 21–19	(gold) Winner
2010	Norwegian International	(Germany) Michael Fuchs	(Russia) Evgenij Dremin (Russia) Anastasia Russkikh	22–20, 21–10	(gold) Winner
2011	Morocco International	(Germany) Michael Fuchs	(Canada) Toby Ng (Canada) Grace Gao	21–15, 21–16	(gold) Winner
2011	Kharkiv International	(Germany) Michael Fuchs	(Singapore) Chayut Triyachart (Singapore) Yao Lei	21–18, 21–14	(gold) Winner
2012	Bulgarian International	(Germany) Michael Fuchs	(Germany) Peter Käsbauer (Germany) Isabel Herttrich	21–9, 21–13	(gold) Winner
2012	Norwegian International	(Germany) Michael Fuchs	(Netherlands) Jorrit de Ruiter (Netherlands) Samantha Barning	21–16, 21–23, 19–21	(silver) Runner-up
2013	Dutch International	(Germany) Michael Fuchs	(Republic of Ireland) Sam Magee (Republic of Ireland) Chloe Magee	21–14, 18–21, 21–17	(gold) Winner
2015	Guatemala International	(Germany) Michael Fuchs	(France) Ronan Labar (France) Émilie Lefel	21–15, 21–16	(gold) Winner
2015	Czech International	(Germany) Michael Fuchs	(Russia) Vitalij Durkin (Russia) Nina Vislova	18–21, 19–21	(silver) Runner-up
2015	USA International	(Germany) Michael Fuchs	(Singapore) Danny Bawa Chrisnanta (Singapore) Vanessa Neo	21–16, 21–17	(gold) Winner
2016	White Nights	(Germany) Michael Fuchs	(Russia) Vitalij Durkin (Russia) Nina Vislova	21–9, 21–12	(gold) Winner

BWF International Challenge tournament
BWF International Series tournament
BWF Future Series tournament
