= Michael Fuchs (badminton) =

German badminton player (born 1982)

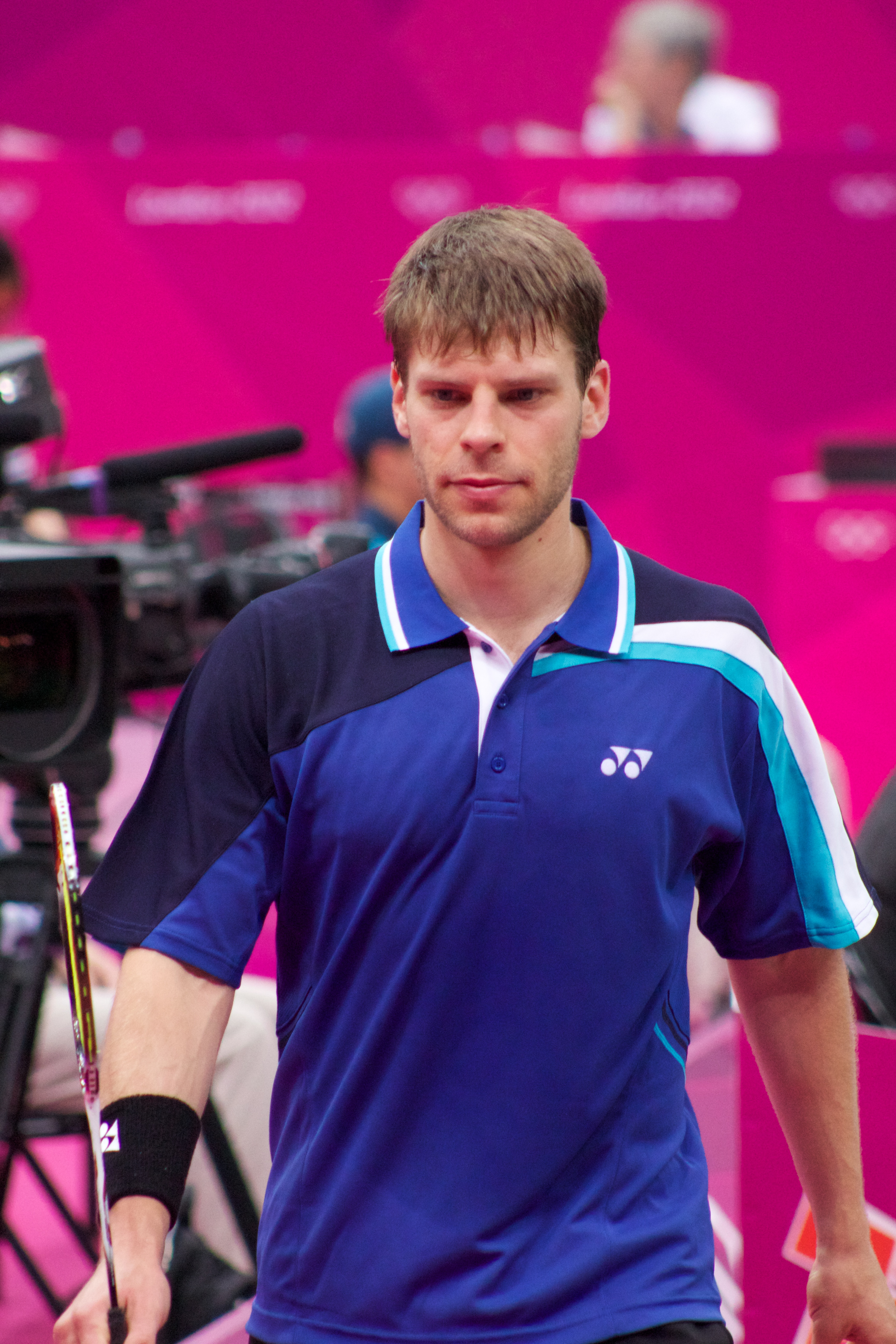

Personal information
- Born: 22 April 1982 (age 44) Würzburg, West Germany
- Years active: 2001
- Height: 1.81 m (5 ft 11 in)
- Weight: 86 kg (190 lb)

Sport
- Country: Germany
- Sport: Badminton
- Handedness: Right

Men's & mixed doubles
- Highest ranking: 15 (MD) 6 (XD)
- Current ranking: Retired
- BWF profile
Medal record
Men's badminton
Representing Germany
European Championships
Silver medal – second place	2012 Karlskrona	Men's doubles
Bronze medal – third place	2010 Manchester	Men's doubles
European Mixed Team Championships
Gold medal – first place	2013 Moscow	Mixed team
Silver medal – second place	2011 Amsterdam	Mixed team
Bronze medal – third place	2015 Leuven	Mixed team
European Men's Team Championships
Silver medal – second place	2012 Amsterdam	Men's team
Silver medal – second place	2006 Thessalonica	Men's team
Bronze medal – third place	2016 Kazan	Men's team
Bronze medal – third place	2014 Basel	Men's team
Bronze medal – third place	2010 Warsaw	Men's team
Bronze medal – third place	2008 Almere	Men's team

Michael Fuchs (born 22 April 1982) is a retired international level badminton player from Germany.

Michael Fuchs concentrates on doubles badminton competing with Johannes Schöttler in Men's and with Birgit Michels in the Mixed event. Fuchs and Michels have risen as high as sixth in the world rankings for their event. At the 2012 Summer Olympics, Fuchs and Michels reached the quarter finals.

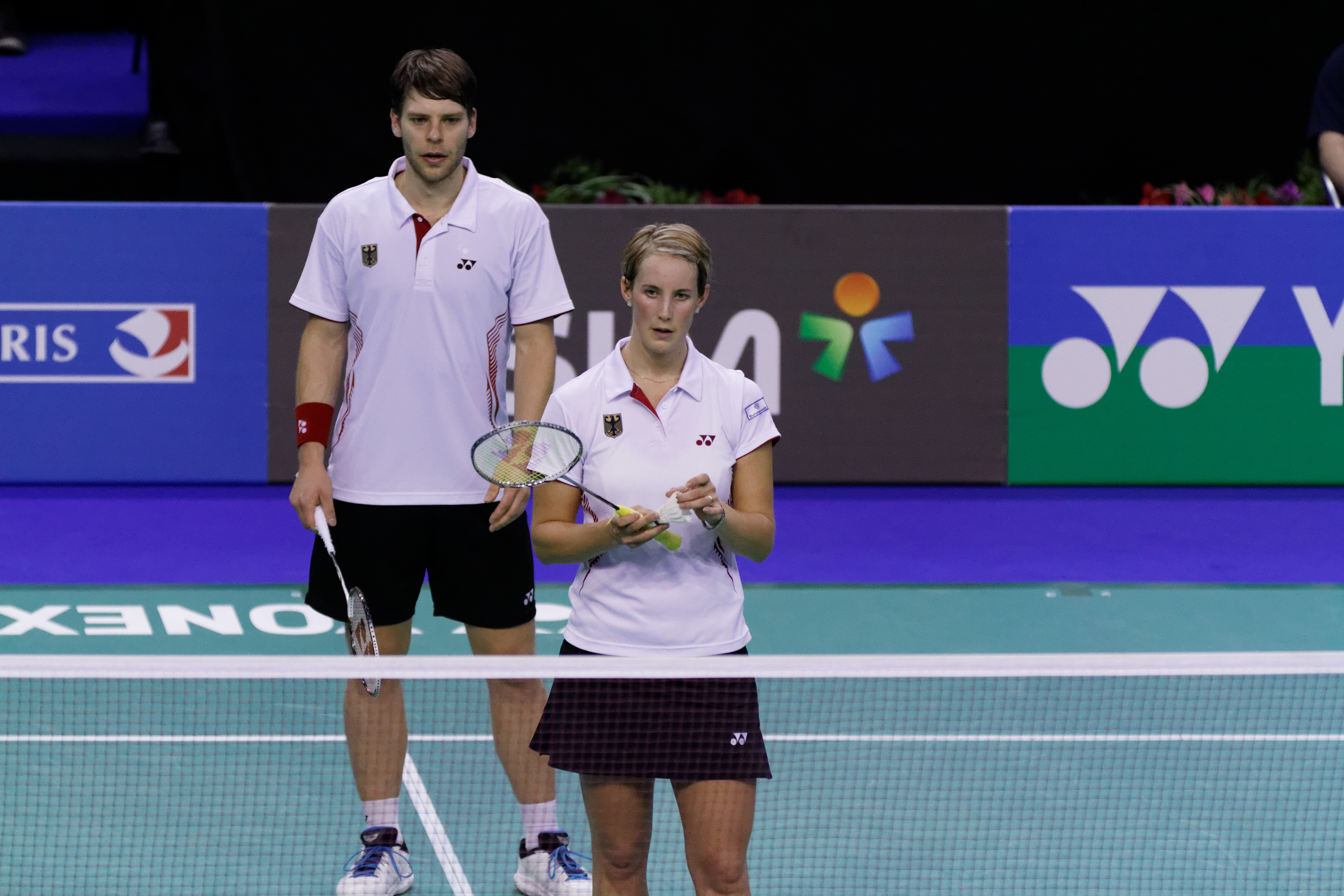
Michael Fuchs with his partner in mixed doubles Birgit Michels

== Achievements ==
=== European Championships ===
Men's doubles
Year	Venue	Partner	Opponent	Score	Result
2010	Manchester Evening News Arena; Manchester, England	(Germany) Ingo Kindervater	(Denmark) Lars Paaske (Denmark) Jonas Rasmussen	10–21, 12–21	Bronze
2012	Telenor Arena; Karlskrona, Sweden	(Germany) Oliver Roth	(Denmark) Mathias Boe (Denmark) Carsten Mogensen	11–21, 11–21	Silver

=== BWF Superseries ===
The BWF Superseries, which was launched on 14 December 2006 and implemented in 2007, was a series of elite badminton tournaments, sanctioned by the Badminton World Federation (BWF). BWF Superseries levels were Superseries and Superseries Premier. A season of Superseries consisted of twelve tournaments around the world that had been introduced since 2011. Successful players were invited to the Superseries Finals, which were held at the end of each year.

Mixed doubles
Year	Tournament	Partner	Opponent	Score	Result
2010	French Open	(Germany) Birgit Michels	(Thailand) Sudket Prapakamol (Thailand) Saralee Thungthongkam	15–21, 15–21	(silver) Runner-up
2014	Japan Open	(Germany) Birgit Michels	(China) Zhang Nan (China) Zhao Yunlei	12–21, 16–21	(silver) Runner-up
2014	Australian Open	(Germany) Birgit Michels	(South Korea) Ko Sung-hyun (South Korea) Kim Ha-na	16–21, 17–21	(silver) Runner-up

BWF Super Series Premier tournament
BWF Super Series tournament

=== BWF Grand Prix ===
The BWF Grand Prix had two levels, the Grand Prix and Grand Prix Gold. It was a series of badminton tournaments sanctioned by the Badminton World Federation (BWF) and played between 2007 and 2017. The World Badminton Grand Prix was sanctioned by the International Badminton Federation from 1983 to 2006.

Men's doubles
Year	Tournament	Partner	Opponent	Score	Result
2005	Thessaloniki Grand Prix	(Germany) Roman Spitko	(England) Robert Blair (England) Anthony Clark	6–15, 9–15	(silver) Runner-up
2009	Dutch Open	(Germany) Ingo Kindervater	(Germany) Kristof Hopp (Germany) Johannes Schöttler	15–21, 16–21	(silver) Runner-up
2015	Scottish Open	(Germany) Johannes Schöttler	(England) Andrew Ellis (England) Peter Mills	21–15, 21–18	(gold) Winner
2016	Brasil Open	(Germany) Fabian Holzer	(Germany) Jones Ralfy Jansen (Germany) Josche Zurwonne	21–19, 21–18	(gold) Winner
2016	Bitburger Open	(Germany) Johannes Schöttler	(Malaysia) Ong Yew Sin (Malaysia) Teo Ee Yi	16–21, 18–21	(silver) Runner up

Mixed doubles
Year	Tournament	Partner	Opponent	Score	Result
2010	U.S. Open	(Germany) Birgit Michels	(Chinese Taipei) Lee Sheng-mu (Chinese Taipei) Chien Yu-chin	21–19, 21–14	(gold) Winner
2010	Bitburger Open	(Germany) Birgit Michels	(China) Zhang Nan (China) Zhao Yunlei	20–22, 9–21	(silver) Runner-up
2011	Canada Open	(Germany) Birgit Michels	(Chinese Taipei) Chen Hung-ling (Chinese Taipei) Cheng Wen-hsing	21–10, 23–21	(gold) Winner
2013	London Grand Prix Gold	(Germany) Birgit Michels	(England) Chris Langridge (England) Heather Olver	21–19, 21–14	(gold) Winner
2013	Bitburger Open	(Germany) Birgit Michels	(England) Chris Adcock (England) Gabrielle White	21–19, 21–15	(gold) Winner
2015	U.S. Grand Prix	(Germany) Birgit Michels	(South Korea) Choi Sol-gyu (South Korea) Eom Hye-won	12–21, 14–21	(silver) Runner up

BWF Grand Prix Gold tournament
BWF Grand Prix tournament

=== BWF International Challenge/Series ===
Men's doubles
Year	Tournament	Partner	Opponent	Score	Result
2001	Italian International	(Germany) Tim Dettmann	(Germany) Arnd Vetters (Germany) Franklin Wahab	0–7, 3–7, 1–7	(silver) Runner-up
2004	Czech International	(Germany) Roman Spitko	(Canada) Mike Beres (Canada) William Milroy	12–15, 13–15	(silver) Runner-up
2005	Dutch International	(Germany) Roman Spitko	(Germany) Kristof Hopp (Germany) Ingo Kindervater	8–15, 6–15	(silver) Runner-up
2005	Belgian International	(Germany) Roman Spitko	(Germany) Kristof Hopp (Germany) Ingo Kindervater	6–15, 10–15	(silver) Runner-up
2005	Irish International	(Germany) Roman Spitko	(France) Mihail Popov (France) Svetoslav Stoyanov	15–9, 5–15, 9–15	(silver) Runner-up
2006	Swedish International	(Germany) Roman Spitko	(Denmark) Anders Kristiansen (Denmark) Simon Mollyhus	21–16, 15–21, 21–16	(gold) Winner
2006	Dutch International	(Germany) Roman Spitko	(Germany) Kristof Hopp (Germany) Ingo Kindervater	10–21, 11–21	(silver) Runner-up
2007	Belgian International	(Germany) Roman Spitko	(Germany) Kristof Hopp (Germany) Ingo Kindervater	27–25, 15–21, 7–21 retired	(silver) Runner-up
2007	Irish International	(Germany) Roman Spitko	(United States) Khan Malaythong (United States) Howard Bach	15–21, 17–21	(silver) Runner-up
2008	Norwegian International	(Germany) Ingo Kindervater	(Netherlands) Ruud Bosch (Netherlands) Koen Ridder	21–18, 19–21, 21–8	(gold) Winner
2010	Belgian International	(Germany) Oliver Roth	(Germany) Ingo Kindervater (Germany) Johannes Schöttler	Walkover	(silver) Runner-up
2011	Morocco International	(Germany) Oliver Roth	(Germany) Ingo Kindervater (Germany) Johannes Schöttler	15–21, 19–21	(silver) Runner-up
2014	Italian International	(Germany) Johannes Schöttler	(England) Marcus Ellis (England) Chris Langridge	11–21, 19–21	(silver) Runner-up
2015	Guatemala International	(Germany) Johannes Schöttler	(India) Manu Attri (India) B. Sumeeth Reddy	21–17, 21–13	(gold) Winner
2015	USA International	(Germany) Johannes Schöttler	(Chinese Taipei) Lin Chia-yu (Chinese Taipei) Wu Hsiao-lin	21–16, 21–23, 19–21	(silver) Runner-up

Mixed doubles
Year	Tournament	Partner	Opponent	Score	Result
2008	Norwegian International	(Germany) Annekatrin Lillie	(Germany) Till Zander (Germany) Gitte Köhler	23–21, 21–12	(gold) Winner
2008	Scotland International	(Germany) Annekatrin Lillie	(England) Robert Adcock (England) Heather Olver	21–16, 21–12	(gold) Winner
2010	Belgian International	(Germany) Birgit Michels	(Germany) Johannes Schöttler (Germany) Sandra Marinello	22–20, 21–19	(gold) Winner
2010	Norwegian International	(Germany) Birgit Michels	(Russia) Evgenij Dremin (Russia) Anastasia Russkikh	22–20, 21–10	(gold) Winner
2011	Morocco International	(Germany) Birgit Michels	(Canada) Toby Ng (Canada) Grace Gao	21–15, 21–16	(gold) Winner
2011	Kharkiv International	(Germany) Birgit Michels	(Singapore) Chayut Triyachart (Singapore) Yao Lei	21–18, 21–14	(gold) Winner
2012	Bulgarian International	(Germany) Birgit Michels	(Germany) Peter Käsbauer (Germany) Isabel Herttrich	21–9, 21–13	(gold) Winner
2012	Norwegian International	(Germany) Birgit Michels	(Netherlands) Jorrit de Ruiter (Netherlands) Samantha Barning	21–16, 21–23, 19–21	(silver) Runner-up
2013	Dutch International	(Germany) Birgit Michels	(Republic of Ireland) Sam Magee (Republic of Ireland) Chloe Magee	21–14, 18–21, 21–17	(gold) Winner
2015	Guatemala International	(Germany) Birgit Michels	(France) Ronan Labar (France) Émilie Lefel	21–15, 21–16	(gold) Winner
2015	Czech International	(Germany) Birgit Michels	(Russia) Vitalij Durkin (Russia) Nina Vislova	18–21, 19–21	(silver) Runner-up
2015	USA International	(Germany) Birgit Michels	(Singapore) Danny Bawa Chrisnanta (Singapore) Vanessa Neo	21–16, 21–17	(gold) Winner
2016	White Nights	(Germany) Birgit Michels	(Russia) Vitalij Durkin (Russia) Nina Vislova	21–9, 21–12	(gold) Winner

BWF International Challenge tournament
BWF International Series tournament
BWF Future Series tournament

== Record Against Selected Opponents ==
Mixed Doubles results with Birgit Michels against Super Series finalists, Worlds Semi-finalists, and Olympic quarterfinalists.

- (China) Zhang Nan & Zhao Yunlei 0–9
- (China) Xu Chen & Ma Jin 0–5
- (China) Qiu Zihan & Bao Yixin 0–1
- (China) Liu Cheng & Bao Yixin 1–1
- (Chinese Taipei) Chen Hung-ling & Cheng Wen-hsing 2–1
- (Chinese Taipei) Lee Sheng-mu & Chien Yu-chin 2–0
- (Denmark) Joachim Fischer Nielsen & Christinna Pedersen 1–4
- (Denmark) Thomas Laybourn & Kamilla Rytter Juhl 2–2
- (England) Chris Adcock & Gabby Adcock 1–3
- (United Kingdom) Chris Adcock & Imogen Bankier 1–0
- (Hong Kong) Lee Chun Hei & Chau Hoi Wah 1–1
- (Indonesia) Tantowi Ahmad & Liliyana Natsir 2–5
- (Indonesia) Riky Widianto & Puspita Richi Dili 0–1
- (South Korea) Lee Yong-dae & Ha Jung-eun 0–2
- (South Korea) Ko Sung-hyun & Ha Jung-eun 0–1
- (South Korea) Ko Sung-hyun & Kim Ha-na 3–3
- (South Korea) Yoo Yeon-seong & Chang Ye-na 2–0
- (Malaysia) Chan Peng Soon & Goh Liu Ying 1–3
- (Poland) Robert Mateusiak & Nadieżda Zięba 1–1
- (Thailand) Sudket Prapakamol & Saralee Thungthongkam 1–5
