= NKT Arena Karlskrona =

Arena in Blekinge, Sweden

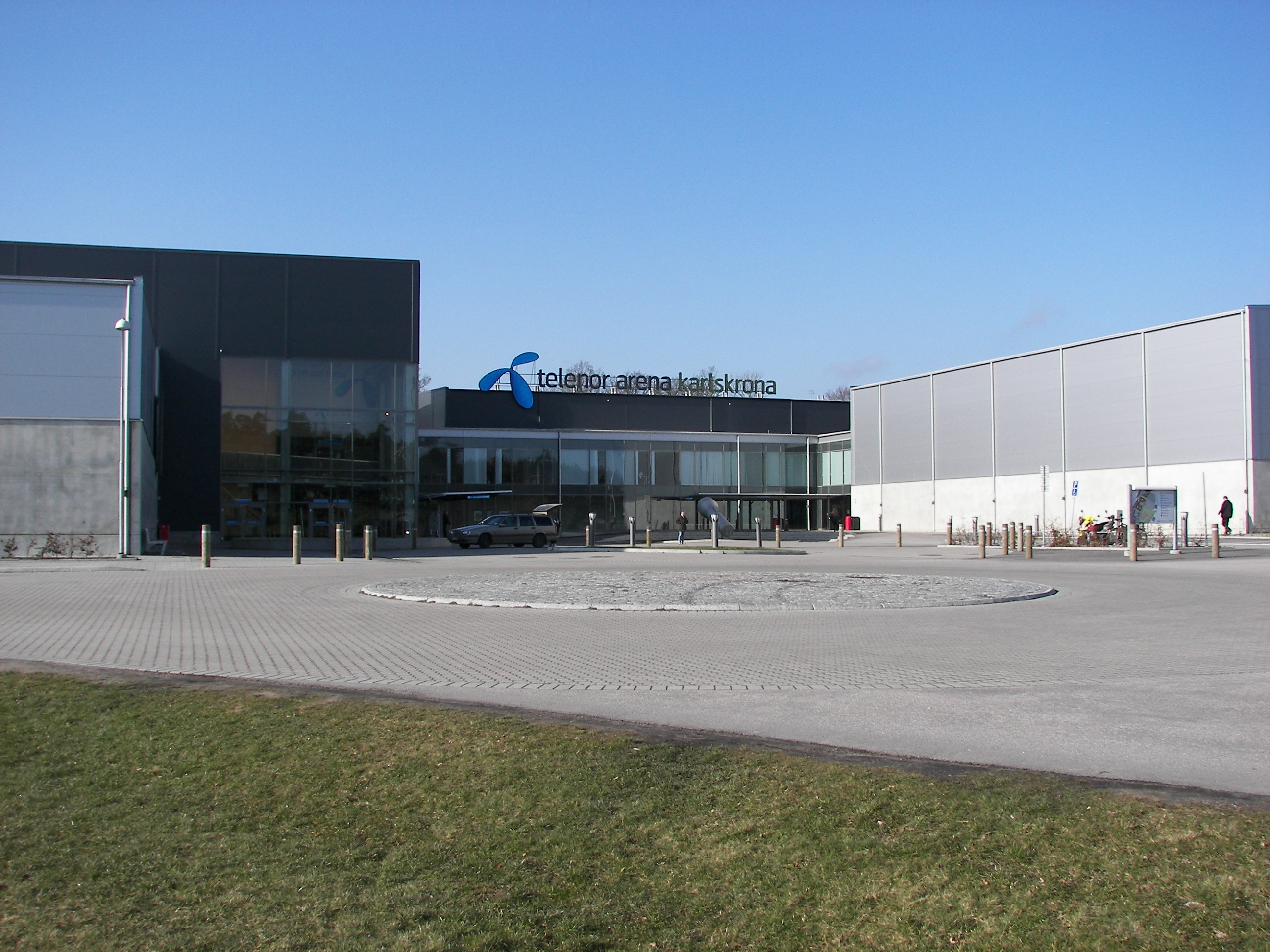
- Interactive map of NKT Arena Karlskrona
- Former names: Telenor Arena Karlskrona; Arena Rosenholm; Vodafone Arena Rosenholm; ABB Arena Karlskrona
- Location: Karlskrona, Sweden
- Coordinates: 56.215129°N 15.605865°E
- Owner: Karlskrona Municipality
- Capacity: 5,050 (ice hockey)

Construction
- Opened: 28 October 2005
- Renovated: 2016
- Expanded: 2016

Tenant
- Karlskrona HK

NKT Arena Karlskrona is a multi-purpose sporting arena providing both indoors and outdoors amenities, and is located in Karlskrona, Sweden. The arena was opened on 28 October 2005. It is the home arena of the ice hockey team Karlskrona HK and has various restaurants.

== Events ==
The construction was divided into six venues for ice hockey, curling, badminton, tennis, gymnastics, swimming, and handball. During ice hockey events, the arena seats 5,050 spectators.

The arena hosted the 3rd semi-final of Melodifestivalen 2006 and the 4th semi-final of Melodifestivalen 2008.

== See also ==
- List of indoor arenas in Sweden
- List of indoor arenas in Nordic countries
