= 2007 Russian Open Grand Prix Gold =

2007 Russian Open Grand Prix
Tournament details
- Dates: December 5, 2007 – December 9, 2007
- Edition: 10th
- Level: Grand Prix Gold
- Total prize money: US$125,000
- Venue: CSKA Universal Sports Hall
- Location: Moscow, Russia

Champions
- Men's singles: (China) Lü Yi
- Women's singles: (China) Wang Yihan
- Men's doubles: (Germany) Kristof Hopp (Germany) Ingo Kindervater
- Women's doubles: (China) Du Jing (China) Yu Yang
- Mixed doubles: (Poland) Robert Mateusiak (Poland) Nadieżda Kostiuczyk

The 2007 Russian Open Grand Prix Gold was a badminton tournament which took place in Moscow, Russia from 5 to 9 December 2007. It had a total purse of $125,000.

== Tournament ==
The 2007 Russian Open Grand Prix Gold was the eleventh and the final tournament of the 2007 BWF Grand Prix Gold and Grand Prix and also part of the Russian Open championships which has been held since 1992. This tournament was organized by the National Badminton Federation of Russia and sanctioned by the BWF.

=== Venue ===
This international tournament was held at CSKA Universal Sports Hall in Moscow, Russia.

=== Point distribution ===
Below is the point distribution for each phase of the tournament based on the BWF points system for the BWF Grand Prix Gold event.

Winner	Runner-up	3/4	5/8	9/16	17/32	33/64	65/128	129/256
7,000	5,950	4,900	3,850	2,750	1,670	660	320	130

=== Prize money ===
The total prize money for this tournament was US$125,000. Distribution of prize money was in accordance with BWF regulations.

Event	Winner	Finals	Semi-finals	Quarter-finals	Last 16
Men's singles	$10,000	$5,000	$2,500	$1,250	$500
Women's singles	$8,625	$4,125	$2,250	$1,125	—N/a
Men's doubles	$9,000	$5,000	$3,000	$1,750	—N/a
Women's doubles	$7,625	$5,000	$2,750	$1,375	—N/a
Mixed doubles	$7,625	$5,000	$2,750	$1,375	—N/a

== Men's singles ==
=== Seeds ===
1. (China) Chen Yu (semi-finals)
2. (China) Chen Hong (withdrew)
3. (Poland) Przemysław Wacha (withdrew)
4. (Denmark) Joachim Persson (quarter-finals)
5. (Canada) Andrew Dabeka (second round)
6. (Japan) Shō Sasaki (second round)
7. (South Korea) Lee Hyun-il (withdrew)
8. (Indonesia) Andre Kurniawan Tedjono (final)

=== Finals ===
Semi-finals
1	(China) Chen Yu	17	21	20
8	(Indonesia) Andre Kurniawan Tedjono	21	18	22
(China) Lü Yi	21	21
(Indonesia) Alamsyah Yunus	19	16

Final
8	(Indonesia) Andre Kurniawan Tedjono	19	21	10
(China) Lü Yi	21	11	21

=== Top half ===
==== Section 1 ====
First round
(Indonesia) D H Rumbaka	21	21
PFQ	(Russia) Ant Ivanov	16	10
(Russia) M Sevenkov	w	/	o
(Czech Republic) P Florián	w	/	o
(Spain) J A Crespo	6	17
(Denmark) R Ulsing	21	21
(Chinese Taipei) Hsieh Y-h	21	23
Q4	(Russia) I Sozonov	19	21

Second round
1	(China) Chen Y	21	21
Q6	(Russia) And Ivanov	10	11
(Indonesia) D H Rumbaka	w	/	o
6	(Japan) S Sasaki	21	17	16
(Indonesia) A Y W Hartanto	15	21	21
(Denmark) R Ulsing	13	21	17
(Chinese Taipei) Hsieh Y-h	21	10	21

Third round
1	(China) Chen Y	21	19	21
(Indonesia) D H Rumbaka	18	21	16
(Indonesia) A Y W Hartanto	18	21	21
(Chinese Taipei) Hsieh Y-h	21	15	14

Quarter-finals
1	(China) Chen Y	16	21	21
(Indonesia) A Y W Hartanto	21	16	16

==== Section 2 ====
First round
(Czech Republic) J Vondra	18	20
(Ukraine) V Druzchenko	21	22
(Canada) B Milroy	21	21
Q1	(Russia) K Khlestov	12	9
(Spain) P Abián	11	21	19
(Denmark) M Christensen	21	15	21
(Lithuania) K Navickas	21	17	21
Q8	(Russia) S Lunev	19	21	11

Second round
4	(Denmark) J Persson	21	21
(France) J Tchoryk	9	4
(Ukraine) V Druzchenko	18	20
(Canada) B Milroy	21	22
8	(Indonesia) A K Tedjono	21	21
(Slovakia) M Matejka	14	5
(Denmark) M Christensen	9	13
(Lithuania) K Navickas	21	21

Third round
4	(Denmark) J Persson	21	13	21
(Canada) B Milroy	9	21	18
8	(Indonesia) A K Tedjono	21	10	21
(Lithuania) K Navickas	18	21	15

Quarter-finals
4	(Denmark) J Persson	15	18
8	(Indonesia) A K Tedjono	21	21

=== Bottom half ===
==== Section 3 ====
First round
Q3	(Russia) M Gorokhov	12	7
PFQ	(Ukraine) V Konov	21	21
Q2	(Russia) V Vorobjev	7	4
(Indonesia) T Sugiarto	21	21
(Peru) A Corpancho	8	21	20
PFQ	(Russia) V Ivanov	21	13	22
(Russia) S Pukhov	17	16
(China) Lü Y	21	21

Second round
PFQ	(Ukraine) V Konov	7	12
(Indonesia) T Sugiarto	21	21
Q7	(Bulgaria) B Kessov	12	13
PFQ	(Ukraine) D Zavadsky	21	21
PFQ	(Russia) V Ivanov	12	14
(China) Lü Y	21	21
(Denmark) J Ø. Jørgensen	18	21	21
PFQ	(Russia) V Malkov	21	7	19

Third round
(Indonesia) T Sugiarto	21	21
PFQ	(Ukraine) D Zavadsky	10	10
(China) Lü Y	21	21
(Denmark) J Ø. Jørgensen	14	17

Quarter-finals
(Indonesia) T Sugiarto	13	14
(China) Lü Y	21	21

==== Section 4 ====
First round
(India) A Bhat	w	/	o
(Austria) J Koch
(Chinese Taipei) Liao S-s	16	21	21
PFQ	(Ukraine) V Atrashchenkov	21	19	13
PFQ	(Russia) A Ashmarin	21	16	8
(Spain) C Longo	18	21	21
(Indonesia) A Yunus	21	21
(Slovenia) L Petrič	15	16

Second round
(India) A Bhat	22	25
(Chinese Taipei) Liao S-s	20	23
(Czech Republic) P Koukal	21	23
5	(Canada) A Dabeka	18	21
(Spain) C Longo	13	14
(Indonesia) A Yunus	21	21
(Iran) K Mehrabi	w	/	o
2	(China) Chen H

Third round
(India) A Bhat	10	21	21
(Czech Republic) P Koukal	21	12	13
(Indonesia) A Yunus	21	21
(Iran) K Mehrabi	17	14

Quarter-finals
(India) A Bhat	12	13
(Indonesia) A Yunus	21	21

== Women's singles ==
=== Seeds ===
1. (Germany) Huaiwen Xu (final)
2. (Bulgaria) Petya Nedelcheva (quarter-finals)
3. (Japan) Eriko Hirose (withdrew)
4. (Germany) Juliane Schenk (first round)
5. (Russia) Ella Diehl (second round)
6. (Canada) Anna Rice (first round)
7. (Netherlands) Judith Meulendijks (quarter-finals)
8. (Chinese Taipei) Cheng Shao-chieh (second round)

=== Finals ===
Semi-finals
1	(Germany) Huaiwen Xu	21	21
(Chinese Taipei) Pai Min-jie	8	14
Q1	(Indonesia) Fransisca Ratnasari	13	15
(China) Wang Yihan	21	21

Final
1	(Germany) Huaiwen Xu	17	21	19
(China) Wang Yihan	21	16	21

=== Top half ===
==== Section 1 ====
First round
1	(Germany) HW Xu	21	21
PFQ	(Slovenia) M Tvrdy	14	15
(China) Wang L	21	21
(Portugal) T Santos	11	14
7	(Netherlands) J Meulendijks	21	21	21
(China) Zhu JJ	18	23	13
(Finland) A Nieminen	21	21
Q2	(Ukraine) M Martynenko	18	15

Second round
1	(Germany) HW Xu	21	21
(China) Wang L	13	12
7	(Netherlands) J Meulendijks	21	21
(Finland) A Nieminen	18	17

Quarter-finals
1	(Germany) HW Xu	21	21
7	(Netherlands) J Meulendijks	17	16

==== Section 2 ====
First round
PFQ	(Belarus) O Konon	16	21	16
Q3	(Indonesia) M E Christina	21	19	21
(Italy) A Allegrini	7	20
(Estonia) K Tolmoff	21	22
6	(Canada) A Rice	17	21	15
PFQ	(Russia) E Ananina	21	10	21
(Switzerland) J Cicognini	17	6
(Chinese Taipei) Pai M-j	21	21

Second round
Q3	(Indonesia) M E Christina	21	20
(Estonia) K Tolmoff	23	22
(Russia) E Ananina	22	7	18
(Chinese Taipei) Pai M-j	20	21	21

Quarter-finals
(Estonia) K Tolmoff	15	21	13
(Chinese Taipei) Pai M-j	21	14	21

=== Bottom half ===
==== Section 3 ====
First round
(Portugal) F Lamy	10	16
Q1	(Indonesia) F Ratnasari	21	21
(Canada) C Reid	14	9
(Chinese Taipei) Cheng S-c	21	21
(Sweden) S Persson	21	21
(Austria) S Prutsch	16	10
(Japan) Y Hirayama	21	21
4	(Germany) J Schenk	16	9

Second round
Q1	(Indonesia) F Ratnasari	21	21
(Chinese Taipei) Cheng S-c	14	16
(Sweden) S Persson	21	21
(Japan) Y Hirayama	18	14

Quarter-finals
Q1	(Indonesia) F Ratnasari	21	21
(Sweden) S Persson	13	12

==== Section 4 ====
First round
Q4	(Russia) E Shimko	10	22
(China) Wang YH	21	24
(Peru) C Rivero	14	17
5	(Russia) E Diehl	21	21
(Ukraine) L Griga	21	21	21
PFQ	(Ukraine) E Prus	10	23	17
(Czech Republic) K Ludíková	17	16
2	(Bulgaria) P Nedelcheva	21	21

Second round
(China) Wang YH	21	21
5	(Russia) E Diehl	10	14
(Ukraine) L Griga	17	11
2	(Bulgaria) P Nedelcheva	21	21

Quarter-finals
(China) Wang YH	21	21
2	(Bulgaria) P Nedelcheva	15	4

== Men's doubles ==
=== Seeds ===
1. (Japan) Shintaro Ikeda / Shuichi Sakamoto (final)
2. (Poland) Michał Łogosz / Robert Mateusiak (quarter-finals)
3. (Russia) Vitalij Durkin / Aleksandr Nikolaenko (quarter-finals)
4. (Canada) Mike Beres / William Milroy (second round)
5. (Germany) Kristof Hopp / Ingo Kindervater (champions)
6. (Denmark) Mathias Boe / Carsten Mogensen (semi-finals)
7. (Germany) Tim Dettmann / Johannes Schöttler (second round)
8. (Indonesia) Yonathan Suryatama Dasuki / Rian Sukmawan (semi-finals)

=== Finals ===
Semi-finals
1	(Japan) Shintaro Ikeda (Japan) Shuichi Sakamoto	16	21	21
8	(Indonesia) Yonathan Suryatama Dasuki (Indonesia) Rian Sukmawan	21	12	13
5	(Germany) Kristof Hopp (Germany) Ingo Kindervater	21	22
6	(Denmark) Mathias Boe (Denmark) Carsten Mogensen	17	20

Final
1	(Japan) Shintaro Ikeda (Japan) Shuichi Sakamoto	16	20
5	(Germany) Kristof Hopp (Germany) Ingo Kindervater	21	22

=== Top half ===
==== Section 1 ====
First round
1	(Japan) S Ikeda (Japan) S Sakamoto	21	21
(England) A Ellis (Wales) M Lewis	16	18
(Russia) And Ivanov (Russia) S Shumilkin	11	18
(England) R Blair (England) D Lindley	21	21
7	(Germany) T Dettmann (Germany) J Schöttler	21	21
(Russia) A Ashmarin (Russia) A Nazarenko	19	16
(England) C Adcock (England) D George	21	17	21
(Singapore) U Yoga (Singapore) C Triyachart	10	21	16

Second round
1	(Japan) S Ikeda (Japan) S Sakamoto	18	21	21
(England) R Blair (England) D Lindley	21	14	16
7	(Germany) T Dettmann (Germany) J Schöttler	19	11
(England) C Adcock (England) D George	21	21

Quarter-finals
1	(Japan) S Ikeda (Japan) S Sakamoto	21	21
(England) C Adcock (England) D George	12	17

==== Section 2 ====
First round
4	(Canada) M Beres (Canada) W Milroy	21	21
(Denmark) J Chemnitz (Denmark) M D Larsen	17	18
(Indonesia) T Ahmad (Indonesia) A Nurgroho	21	17	21
Q2	(Russia) V Ivanov (Russia) N Khakimov	9	21	14
8	(Indonesia) Y S Dasuki (Indonesia) R Sukmawan	21	19	23
(Russia) E Dremin (Russia) A Vasiliev	10	21	21
(Bulgaria) S Makarski (Bulgaria) V Metodiev	4	14
(Chinese Taipei) Hu C-s (Chinese Taipei) Tsai C-h	21	21

Second round
4	(Canada) M Beres (Canada) W Milroy	22	17	14
(Indonesia) T Ahmad (Indonesia) A Nurgroho	20	21	21
8	(Indonesia) Y S Dasuki (Indonesia) R Sukmawan	16	21	21
(Chinese Taipei) Hu C-s (Chinese Taipei) Tsai C-h	21	11	12

Quarter-finals
(Indonesia) T Ahmad (Indonesia) A Nurgroho	17	13
8	(Indonesia) Y S Dasuki (Indonesia) R Sukmawan	21	21

=== Bottom half ===
==== Section 3 ====
First round
(Scotland) A Bowman (England) K Roebuck	21	21
Q3	(Russia) K Khlestov (Russia) V Malkov	10	12
(Indonesia) M Ahsan (Indonesia) B Septano	17	16
5	(Germany) K Hopp (Germany) I Kindervater	21	21
(Russia) S Chunalov (Russia) M Sevenkov
SUB	(Chinese Taipei) Lee S-m (Chinese Taipei) Liao S-s	w	/	o
(England) R Adcock (England) R Middleton	14	14
3	(Russia) V Durkin (Russia) A Nikolaenko	21	21

Second round
(Scotland) A Bowman (England) K Roebuck	17	15
5	(Germany) K Hopp (Germany) I Kindervater	21	21
SUB	(Chinese Taipei) Lee S-m (Chinese Taipei) Liao S-s	9	15
3	(Russia) V Durkin (Russia) A Nikolaenko	21	21

Quarter-finals
5	(Germany) K Hopp (Germany) I Kindervater	21	21
3	(Russia) V Durkin (Russia) A Nikolaenko	15	19

==== Section 4 ====
First round
Q4	(Belarus) A Konakh (Russia) A Russkikh	15	12
(Denmark) R Bonde (Denmark) K Henriksen	21	21
(Russia) Ant Ivanov (Russia) I Sozonov	11	17
6	(Denmark) M Boe (Denmark) C Mogensen	21	21
(Indonesia) R Wijaya (Indonesia) F Kurniawan	21	21
(England) R Eidestedt (England) C Langridge	18	16
(Ukraine) A Diptan (Ukraine) V Konov	9	15
2	(Poland) M Łogosz (Poland) R Mateusiak	21	21

Second round
(Denmark) R Bonde (Denmark) K Henriksen	17	18
6	(Denmark) M Boe (Denmark) C Mogensen	21	21
(Indonesia) R Wijaya (Indonesia) F Kurniawan	20	23	9
2	(Poland) M Łogosz (Poland) R Mateusiak	22	21	21

Quarter-finals
6	(Denmark) M Boe (Denmark) C Mogensen	12	21	21
2	(Poland) M Łogosz (Poland) R Mateusiak	21	15	14

== Women's doubles ==
=== Seeds ===
1. (Chinese Taipei) Cheng Wen-hsing / Chien Yu-chin (final)
2. (Germany) Nicole Grether / Juliane Schenk (withdrew)
3. (China) Du Jing / Yu Yang (champions)
4. (South Korea) Ha Jung-eun / Kim Min-jung (withdrew)
5. (Denmark) Kamilla Rytter Juhl / Lena Frier Kristiansen (quarter-finals)
6. (Russia) Valeria Sorokina / Nina Vislova (second round)
7. (Sweden) Elin Bergblom / Johanna Persson (second round)
8. (Russia) Ekaterina Ananina / Anastasia Russkikh (first round)

=== Finals ===
Semi-finals
1	(Chinese Taipei) Cheng Wen-hsing (Chinese Taipei) Chien Yu-chin	21	21
(Poland) Kamila Augustyn (Poland) Nadieżda Kostiuszyk	12	13
3	(China) Du Jing (China) Yu Yang	21	21
(Russia) Tatjana Bibik (Russia) Elena Schimko	11	12

Final
1	(Chinese Taipei) Cheng Wen-hsing (Chinese Taipei) Chien Yu-chin	14	14
3	(China) Du Jing (China) Yu Yang	21	21

=== Top half ===
==== Section 1 ====
First round
1	(Chinese Taipei) Cheng W-h (Chinese Taipei) Chien Y-c	21	21
(Russia) M Emelianenko (Russia) O Fedyakina	6	5
(Indonesia) N C Poluakan (Indonesia) Yulianti	21	15	21
(Russia) P Anastasia (Russia) I Khlebko	13	21	10
5	(Denmark) K R Juhl (Denmark) L F Kristiansen	21	21
(Russia) O Gurina (Russia) I Inozemceva	7	10
(Ukraine) M Lysenko (Ukraine) Y Zharka	4	11
(England) S Rayappan (England) J Wallwork	21	21

Second round
1	(Chinese Taipei) Cheng W-h (Chinese Taipei) Chien Y-c	21	21
(Indonesia) N C Poluakan (Indonesia) Yulianti	12	12
5	(Denmark) K R Juhl (Denmark) L F Kristiansen	20	21	21
(England) S Rayappan (England) J Wallwork	22	16	12

Quarter-finals
1	(Chinese Taipei) Cheng W-h (Chinese Taipei) Chien Y-c	21	21
5	(Denmark) K R Juhl (Denmark) L F Kristiansen	6	19

==== Section 2 ====
First round
4	(South Korea) Ha J-e (South Korea) Kim M-j
(United States) P Phongasavithas (United States) V Phongasavithas	w	/	o
(Chinese Taipei) Chang L-y (Chinese Taipei) Hung S-c
(Germany) C Mette (Germany) B Overzier	w	/	o
6	(Russia) V Sorokina (Russia) N Vislova	21	21
(Peru) J Meng (Peru) V Rivero	9	13
(Poland) K Augustyn (Poland) N Kostiuszyk	21	21
(England) L Smith (England) G White	16	13

Second round
(United States) P Phongasavithas (United States) V Phongasavithas	6	8
(Germany) C Mette (Germany) B Overzier	21	21
6	(Russia) V Sorokina (Russia) N Vislova	21	6	11
(Poland) K Augustyn (Poland) N Kostiuszyk	17	21	21

Quarter-finals
(Germany) C Mette (Germany) B Overzier	16	8
(Poland) K Augustyn (Poland) N Kostiuszyk	21	21

=== Bottom half ===
==== Section 3 ====
First round
(England) N Munt (England) J Nicholas	21	21
(Russia) E Chernjavskaya (Russia) A Prokopenko	13	14
(Scotland) I Bankier (England) S Bok	21	21
8	(Russia) E Ananina (Russia) A Russkikh	19	19
(Russia) T Kuznetcova (Russia) N Perminova	14	6
SUB	(Chinese Taipei) Chou C-c (Chinese Taipei) Pai M-j	21	21
(Denmark) C Pedersen (Denmark) M Schjøtt-Kristensen	8	15
3	(China) Du J (China) Yu Y	21	21

Second round
(England) N Munt (England) J Nicholas	21	19	21
(Scotland) I Bankier (England) S Bok	10	21	19
SUB	(Chinese Taipei) Chou C-c (Chinese Taipei) Pai M-j	15	11
3	(China) Du J (China) Yu Y	21	21

Quarter-finals
(England) N Munt (England) J Nicholas	10	11
3	(China) Du J (China) Yu Y	21	21

==== Section 4 ====
First round
(Russia) L Chudentcevc (Russia) O Kozlova	6	15
(Bulgaria) D Dimova (Bulgaria) P Nedelcheva	21	21
(Russia) K Polikarpova (Russia) V Rojdestvenskaya	9	10
7	(Sweden) E Bergblom (Sweden) J Persson	21	21
(Canada) F McKee (Canada) C Reid	21	9	11
(Russia) T Bibik (Russia) E Schimko	18	21	21
(Peru) C Calderon (Chinese Taipei) Yang C-c	w	/	o
2	(Germany) N Grether (Germany) J Schenk	w	/	o

Second round
(Bulgaria) D Dimova (Bulgaria) P Nedelcheva	21	21
7	(Sweden) E Bergblom (Sweden) J Persson	14	18
(Russia) T Bibik (Russia) E Schimko	w	/	o

Quarter-finals
(Bulgaria) D Dimova (Bulgaria) P Nedelcheva	21	6	16
(Russia) T Bibik (Russia) E Schimko	18	21	21

== Mixed doubles ==
=== Seeds ===
1. (China) He Hanbin / Yu Yang (final)
2. (Poland) Robert Mateusiak / Nadieżda Kostiuczyk (champions)
3. (South Korea) Han Sang-hoon / Hwang Yu-mi (withdrew)
4. (Germany) Ingo Kindervater / Kathrin Piotrowski (quarter-finals)
5. (South Korea) Lee Yong-dae / Lee Hyo-jung (withdrew)
6. (Germany) Kristof Hopp / Birgit Overzier (second round)
7. (Russia) Aleksandr Nikolaenko / Nina Vislova (second round)
8. (Denmark) Joachim Fischer Nielsen / Britta Andersen (semi-finals)

=== Finals ===
Semi-finals
1	(China) He Hanbin (China) Yu Yang	21	21
8	(Denmark) Joachim Fischer Nielsen (Denmark) Britta Andersen	14	14
(England) David Lindley (England) Suzanne Rayappan	16	22	11
2	(Poland) Robert Mateusiak (Poland) Nadieżda Kostiuczyk	21	20	21

Final
1	(China) He Hanbin (China) Yu Yang	23	21	13
2	(Poland) Robert Mateusiak (Poland) Nadieżda Kostiuczyk	25	13	21

=== Top half ===
==== Section 1 ====
First round
1	(China) He HB (China) Yu Y	21	21
(Ukraine) V Atrashchenkov (Ukraine) E Prus	16	7
(Russia) A Nazarenko (Russia) E Chernjavskaya	21	12	21
Q1	(Ukraine) D Zavadsky (Ukraine) M Martynenko	14	21	11
PFQ	(Indonesia) A Nugroho (Indonesia) N C Poluakan	23	21
(England) C Adcock (England) G White	21	12
(Scotland) A Bowman (England) S Bok	21	21
(Indonesia) T Ahmad (Indonesia) Yulianti	9	15

Second round
1	(China) He HB (China) Yu Y	21	21
(Russia) A Nazarenko (Russia) E Chernjavskaya	8	16
PFQ	(Indonesia) A Nugroho (Indonesia) N C Poluakan	21	15	21
(Scotland) A Bowman (England) S Bok	17	21	12

Quarter-finals
1	(China) He HB (China) Yu Y	21	21
(Indonesia) A Nugroho (Indonesia) N C Poluakan	13	19

==== Section 2 ====
First round
4	(Germany) I Kindervater (Germany) K Piotrowski	21	29	21
Q3	(Russia) V Malkutin (Russia) K Polikarpova	12	30	15
(England) R Middleton (England) L Smith	21	21
Q2	(Chinese Taipei) Lee S-m (Chinese Taipei) Chou C-c	15	10
8	(Denmark) J Fischer Nielsen (Denmark) B Andersen	21	21
(Russia) V Durkin (Russia) V Sorokina	12	15
(Denmark) M D Larsen (Denmark) M Schjøtt-Kristensen	9	23	21
(Chinese Taipei) Hsieh Y-h (Chinese Taipei) Chien Y-c	21	21	15

Second round
4	(Germany) I Kindervater (Germany) K Piotrowski	21	21
(England) R Middleton (England) L Smith	12	17
8	(Denmark) J Fischer Nielsen (Denmark) B Andersen	21	21
(Denmark) M D Larsen (Denmark) M Schjøtt-Kristensen	7	12

Quarter-finals
4	(Germany) I Kindervater (Germany) K Piotrowski	15	17
8	(Denmark) J Fischer Nielsen (Denmark) B Andersen	21	21

=== Bottom half ===
==== Section 3 ====
First round
(Denmark) R Bonde (Denmark) C Pedersen	21	17	15
SUB	(Chinese Taipei) Hu C-s (Chinese Taipei) Cheng W-h	19	21	21
(Denmark) J Chemnitz (Denmark) M Røpke	19	18
6	(Germany) K Hopp (Germany) B Overzier	21	21
(Russia) E Dremin (Russia) A Russkikh	21	21
Q4	(Peru) A Corpancho (Peru) V Rivero	11	12
(England) D Lindley (England) S Rayappan	21	19	21
PFQ	(Germany) T Dettmann (Sweden) J Persson	13	21	13

Second round
SUB	(Chinese Taipei) Hu C-s (Chinese Taipei) Cheng W-h	21	21
6	(Germany) K Hopp (Germany) B Overzier	19	14
(Russia) E Dremin (Russia) A Russkikh	18	19
(England) D Lindley (England) S Rayappan	21	21

Quarter-finals
SUB	(Chinese Taipei) Hu C-s (Chinese Taipei) Cheng W-h	18	9
(England) D Lindley (England) S Rayappan	21	21

==== Section 4 ====
First round
(England) K Roebuck (England) J Wallwork	20	16
(England) R Blair (Scotland) I Bankier	22	21
(Poland) M Łogosz (England) N Munt	21	9
7	(Russia) A Nikolaenko (Russia) N Vislova	23	21
(England) C Langridge (England) J Nicholas	21	15	21
(New Zealand) C Cooper (New Zealand) R Flavell	12	21	12
(Chinese Taipei) Tsai C-h (Chinese Taipei) Cheng S-c	21	13	13
2	(Poland) R Mateusiak (Poland) N Kostiuczyk	18	21	21

Second round
(England) R Blair (Scotland) I Bankier	20	21	21
7	(Russia) A Nikolaenko (Russia) N Vislova	22	16	10
(England) C Langridge (England) J Nicholas	16	19
2	(Poland) R Mateusiak (Poland) N Kostiuczyk	21	21

Quarter-finals
(England) R Blair (Scotland) I Bankier	15	11
2	(Poland) R Mateusiak (Poland) N Kostiuczyk	21	21

Preceded by 2007 Vietnam Open Grand Prix	2007 BWF Grand Prix Gold and Grand Prix; 2007 BWF season	Succeeded by 2008 German Open Grand Prix
