= 2007 China Masters Super Series =

Tournament details
- Dates: 10 July 2007 – 15 July 2007
- Edition: 3rd
- Level: Super Series
- Total prize money: US$250,000
- Venue: Sichuan Provincial Gymnasium
- Location: Chengdu, China

Champions
- Men's singles: (China) Lin Dan
- Women's singles: (China) Xie Xingfang
- Men's doubles: (China) Cai Yun (China) Fu Haifeng
- Women's doubles: (Indonesia) Vita Marissa (Indonesia) Liliyana Natsir
- Mixed doubles: (China) Zheng Bo (China) Gao Ling

The 2007 China Masters Super Series was a badminton tournament which took place at Sichuan Provincial Gymnasium in Chengdu, China, from 10 to 15 July 2007 and had a total purse of $250,000.

== Tournament ==
The 2007 China Masters Super Series was the seventh tournament of the 2007 BWF Super Series and also part of the China Masters championships, which had been held since 2005.

=== Venue ===
This international tournament was held at Sichuan Provincial Gymnasium in Chengdu, China.

=== Point distribution ===
Below is the point distribution for each phase of the tournament based on the BWF points system for the BWF Super Series event.

Winner	Runner-up	3/4	5/8	9/16	17/32	33/64	65/128	129/256
9,200	7,800	6,420	5,040	3,600	2,220	880	430	170

=== Prize money ===
The total prize money for this tournament was US$250,000. Distribution of prize money was in accordance with BWF regulations.

Event	Winner	Finalist	Semi-finals	Quarter-finals	Last 16
Men's singles	$20,000	$10,000	$5,000	$2,500	$1,000
Women's singles	$17,250	$8,250	$4,500	$2,250	—
Men's doubles	$18,000	$10,000	$6,000	$3,500	—
Women's doubles	$15,250	$10,000	$5,500	$2,750	—
Mixed doubles	$15,250	$10,000	$5,500	$2,750	—

== Men's singles ==
=== Seeds ===
1. (China) Lin Dan (champion)
2. (China) Chen Hong (first round)
3. (Malaysia) Lee Chong Wei (semi-finals)
4. (China) Chen Jin (first round)
5. (China) Chen Yu (first round)
6. (China) Bao Chunlai (quarter-finals)
7. (Denmark) Peter Gade (semi-finals)
8. (Denmark) Kenneth Jonassen (quarter-finals)

=== Finals ===
Semi-finals
1	(China) Lin Dan	15	21	21
3	(Malaysia) Lee Chong Wei	21	14	15
(Poland) Przemysław Wacha	21	13	13
(Malaysia) Wong Choong Hann	17	21	21

Final
1	(China) Lin Dan	21	21
(Malaysia) Wong Choong Hann	19	9

=== Top half ===
==== Section 1 ====
First Round
1	(China) Lin D	21	21
(Singapore) R Susilo	14	14
PFQ	(Netherlands) E Pang	17	19
Q1	(China) Du PY	21	21
6	(China) Bao CL	19	21	21
(Netherlands) D Palyama	21	15	13
(Malaysia) Yeoh K B	21	20	21
PFQ	(New Zealand) J Moody	13	22	16

Second Round
1	(China) Lin D	21	21
Q1	(China) Du PY	11	16
6	(China) Bao CL	21	21
(Malaysia) Yeoh K B	10	14

Quarter-finals
1	(China) Lin D	19	21	21
6	(China) Bao CL	21	18	12

==== Section 2 ====
First Round
3	(Malaysia) Lee C W	21	21
(England) A Smith	8	17
(Malaysia) S A Ayob	21	23
(Hong Kong) Chan Y K	15	21
7	(Denmark) P Gade	21	21
(Hong Kong) Ng W	18	14
(Indonesia) T Hidayat	14	21	21
(Denmark) J Persson	21	8	14

Second Round
3	(Malaysia) Lee C W	21	21
(Malaysia) S A Ayob	15	16
7	(Denmark) P Gade	14	7
(Indonesia) T Hidayat	21	21

Quarter-finals
3	(Malaysia) Lee C W	22	20	21
(Indonesia) T Hidayat	20	22	17

=== Bottom half ===
==== Section 3 ====
First Round
Q3	(China) Lü Y	21	21
Q4	(Germany) B Joppien	16	12
(Poland) P Wacha	21	12	21
5	(China) Chen Y	14	21	17
(Japan) S Satō	21	12	6
(Malaysia) M H Hashim	19	21	21
(Thailand) B Ponsana	21	21
4	(China) Chen J	11	16

Second Round
Q3	(China) Lü Y	16	16
(Poland) P Wacha	21	21
(Malaysia) M H Hashim	13	11
(Thailand) B Ponsana	21	21

Quarter-finals
(Poland) P Wacha	21	18	21
(Thailand) B Ponsana	15	21	16

==== Section 4 ====
First Round
(Indonesia) S Santoso	21	21
(Singapore) K Lee Y H	19	18
(Wales) R Vaughan	12	10
8	(Denmark) K Jonassen	21	21
Q2	(China) Qui YB	11	15
(Indonesia) S D Kuncoro	21	21
(Malaysia) Wong C H	21	11	21
2	(China) Chen H	16	21	18

Second Round
(Indonesia) S Santoso	12	13
8	(Denmark) K Jonassen	21	21
(Indonesia) S D Kuncoro	21	14	14
(Malaysia) Wong C H	18	21	21

Quarter-finals
8	(Denmark) K Jonassen	13	19
(Malaysia) Wong C H	21	21

== Women's singles ==
=== Seeds ===
1. (China) Zhang Ning (final)
2. (China) Xie Xingfang (champion)
3. (China) Zhu Lin (first round)
4. (Germany) Huaiwen Xu (quarter-finals)
5. (Hong Kong) Wang Chen (second round)
6. (France) Pi Hongyan (semi-finals)
7. (Netherlands) Yao Jie (second round)
8. (China) Lu Lan (quarter-finals)

=== Finals ===
Semi-finals
1	(China) Zhang Ning	21	21
6	(France) Pi Hongyan	18	6
(Hong Kong) Yip Pui Yin	6	16
2	(China) Xie Xingfang	21	21

Final
1	(China) Zhang Ning	11	21	21
2	(China) Xie Xingfang	21	8	23

=== Top half ===
==== Section 1 ====
First Round
1	(China) Zhang N	21	21	21
(Denmark) T Rasmussen	23	12	13
(Sweden) S Persson	21	21
(Austria) S Prutsch	5	14
5	(Hong Kong) Wang C	21	21
(Japan) Y Hirayama	15	9
Q2	(China) Wang YH	21	21
(Chinese Taipei) Pai M-j	19	6

Second Round
1	(China) Zhang N	21	21
(Sweden) S Persson	12	9
5	(Hong Kong) Wang C	18	7
Q2	(China) Wang YH	21	21

Quarter-finals
1	(China) Zhang N	15	22	21
Q2	(China) Wang YH	21	20	14

==== Section 2 ====
First Round
4	(Germany) HW Xu	22	21
(Malaysia) Wong M C	20	14
Q4	(China) Han L	11
(Canada) A Rice	4^{r}
6	(France) Pi HY	21	21
(Finland) A Nieminen	15	12
(Indonesia) M K Yulianti	19	21	21
(Japan) K Mori	21	16	15

Second Round
4	(Germany) HW Xu	21	21
Q4	(China) Han L	12	11
6	(France) Pi HY	21	21
(Indonesia) M K Yulianti	12	13

Quarter-finals
4	(Germany) HW Xu	21	13	15
6	(France) Pi HY	14	21	21

=== Bottom half ===
==== Section 3 ====
First Round
(Chinese Taipei) Cheng S-c	21	21
Q1	(India) S Kurien	17	11
(Bulgaria) P Nedelcheva	11	22	15
7	(Netherlands) Yao J	21	20	21
(Hong Kong) Yip P Y	21	21
Q3	(China) Li W	12	10
(Japan) E Hirose	14	21	21
3	(China) Zhu L	21	16	13

Second Round
(Chinese Taipei) Cheng S-c	13	23	21
7	(Netherlands) Yao J	21	21	19
(Hong Kong) Yip P Y	23	21
(Japan) E Hirose	21	11

Quarter-finals
(Chinese Taipei) Cheng S-c	14	21	16
(Hong Kong) Yip P Y	21	12	21

==== Section 4 ====
First Round
(Netherlands) J Meulendijks	16	13
(China) Wang L	21	21
(England) T Hallam	13	21	14
8	(China) Lu L	21	19	21
(Germany) J Schenk	21	21
(Italy) A Allegrini	15	8
PFQ	(France) W Rahmawati	10	9
2	(China) Xie XF	21	21

Second Round
(China) Wang L	16	21	15
8	(China) Lu L	21	18	21
(Germany) J Schenk	20	17
2	(China) Xie XF	22	21

Quarter-finals
8	(China) Lu L	21	19	12
2	(China) Xie XF	13	21	21

== Men's doubles ==
=== Seeds ===
1. (China) Fu Haifeng / Cai Yun (champions)
2. (Indonesia) Markis Kido / Hendra Setiawan (final)
3. (Malaysia) Choong Tan Fook / Lee Wan Wah (second round)
4. (England) Anthony Clark / Robert Blair (first round)
5. (Hong Kong) Albertus Susanto Njoto / Yohan Hadikusumo Wiratama (second round)
5. (Japan) Shuichi Sakamoto / Shintaro Ikeda (second round)
6. (Malaysia) Mohd Zakry Abdul Latif / Mohd Fairuzizuan Mohd Tazari (second round)
7. (Poland) Michał Łogosz / Robert Mateusiak (first round)

=== Finals ===
Semi-finals
1	(China) Fu Haifeng (China) Cai Yun	21	21
(Malaysia) Tan Bin Shen (Malaysia) Ong Soon Hock	9	15
(Indonesia) Luluk Hadiyanto (Indonesia) Alvent Yulianto	21	13	16
2	(Indonesia) Markis Kido (Indonesia) Hendra Setiawan	14	21	21

Final
1	(China) Fu Haifeng (China) Cai Yun	21	21
2	(Indonesia) Markis Kido (Indonesia) Hendra Setiawan	15	16

=== Top half ===
==== Section 1 ====
First Round
1	(China) Fu HF (China) Cai Y	21	21
(Germany) K Hopp (Germany) I Kindervater	12	17
(Chinese Taipei) Tsai C-h (Chinese Taipei) Hu C-s	19	13
Q4	(Denmark) M Boe (Denmark) C Mogensen	21	21
5	(Hong Kong) A S Njoto (Hong Kong) Y H Wiratama	21	21
(Chinese Taipei) Fang C-m (Chinese Taipei) Lee S-m	9	17
(China) Xu C (China) Li R	18	16
Q1	(China) Xie ZB (China) Guo ZD	21	21

Second Round
1	(China) Fu HF (China) Cai Y	21	21
Q4	(Denmark) M Boe (Denmark) C Mogensen	19	15
5	(Hong Kong) A S Njoto (Hong Kong) Y H Wiratama	21	14	13
Q1	(China) Xie ZB (China) Guo ZD	16	21	21

Quarter-finals
1	(China) Fu HF (China) Cai Y	w	/	o
Q1	(China) Xie ZB (China) Guo ZD

==== Section 2 ====
First Round
4	(England) A Clark (England) R Blair	19	14
Q2	(China) Zhang J (China) Zheng B	21	21
(Germany) R Spitko (Germany) M Fuchs	17	13
(Denmark) S Mollyhus (Denmark) A Kristiansen	21	21
5	(Japan) S Sakamoto (Japan) S Ikeda	25	21
(Hong Kong) Hui W H (Hong Kong) A T Putra	23	18
(Malaysia) Tan B S (Malaysia) Ong S H	21	21
(France) S Stoyanov (France) M Popov	14	16

Second Round
Q2	(China) Zhang J (China) Zheng B	21	25	0^{r}
(Denmark) S Mollyhus (Denmark) A Kristiansen	18	27	0
5	(Japan) S Sakamoto (Japan) S Ikeda	14	23
(Malaysia) Tan B S (Malaysia) Ong S H	21	25

Quarter-finals
(Denmark) S Mollyhus (Denmark) A Kristiansen	10	17
(Malaysia) Tan B S (Malaysia) Ong S H	21	21

=== Bottom half ===
==== Section 3 ====
First Round
(China) Shen Y (China) He HB	21	21
(Australia) G Warfe (Australia) R Smith	12	12
(Chinese Taipei) Chien Y-h (Chinese Taipei) Lin Y-l	13	17
6	(Malaysia) M Z Abdul Latif (Malaysia) M F Mohd Tazari	21	21
(Indonesia) L Hadiyanto (Indonesia) A Yulianto	21	10	21
(Denmark) R Andersen (Denmark) P Steffensen	19	21	13
(Australia) A Brehaut (Australia) A B Sindoro	14	23	7
3	(Malaysia) Choong T F (Malaysia) Lee W W	21	21	21

Second Round
(China) Shen Y (China) He HB	21	15	21
6	(Malaysia) M Z Abdul Latif (Malaysia) M F Mohd Tazari	19	21	17
(Indonesia) L Hadiyanto (Indonesia) A Yulianto	24	21
3	(Malaysia) Choong T F (Malaysia) Lee W W	22	17

Quarter-finals
(China) Shen Y (China) He HB	21	15
(Indonesia) L Hadiyanto (Indonesia) A Yulianto	23	21

==== Section 4 ====
First Round
Q3	(China) Sun JJ (China) Zhang W	18	11
(Indonesia) H A Gunawan (Indonesia) J Riyadi	21	21
(Japan) T Ōtsuka (Japan) K Masuda	21	21
7	(Poland) M Łogosz (Poland) R Mateusiak	18	11
(Malaysia) Chew C E (Malaysia) Hong C H	21	21
(England) R Adcock (England) R Middleton	10	16
(Malaysia) Chan C M (Malaysia) Hoon T H	15	18
2	(Indonesia) M Kido (Indonesia) H Setiawan	21	21

Second Round
(Indonesia) H A Gunawan (Indonesia) J Riyadi	21	21
(Japan) T Ōtsuka (Japan) K Masuda	17	12
(Malaysia) Chew C E (Malaysia) Hong C H	13	13
2	(Indonesia) M Kido (Indonesia) H Setiawan	21	21

Quarter-finals
(Indonesia) H A Gunawan (Indonesia) J Riyadi	18	16
2	(Indonesia) M Kido (Indonesia) H Setiawan	21	21

== Women's doubles ==
=== Seeds ===
1. (China) Zhang Yawen / Wei Yili (quarter-finals)
2. (China) Gao Ling / Huang Sui (quarter-finals)
3. (Chinese Taipei) Chien Yu-chin / Cheng Wen-hsing (second round)
4. (Malaysia) Wong Pei Tty / Chin Eei Hui (second round)
5. (China) Zhao Tingting / Yang Wei (final)
6. (Japan) Kumiko Ogura / Reiko Shiota (quarter-finals)
7. (England) Gail Emms / Donna Kellogg (semi-finals)
8. (China) Du Jing / Yu Yang (semi-finals)

=== Finals ===
Semi-finals
8	(China) Du Jing (China) Yu Yang	21	20	18
(Indonesia) Liliyana Natsir (Indonesia) Vita Marissa	11	22	21
7	(England) Gail Emms (England) Donna Kellogg	9	16
5	(China) Zhao Tingting (China) Yang Wei	21	21

Final
(Indonesia) Liliyana Natsir (Indonesia) Vita Marissa	12	21	21
5	(China) Zhao Tingting (China) Yang Wei	21	15	16

=== Top half ===
==== Section 1 ====
First Round
(Malaysia) Fong C Y (Malaysia) Mooi H Y	w	/	o
(England) S Rayappan (England) J Wallwork
8	(China) Du J (China) Yu Y	21	21
(Japan) M Maeda (Japan) S Suetsuna	13	8
(China) Zhao YL (China) Cheng S	21	21
(Indonesia) J Novita (Indonesia) G Polii	16	18

Second Round
1	(China) Zhang YW (China) Wei YL	21	21
(Malaysia) Fong C Y (Malaysia) Mooi H Y	9	9
8	(China) Du J (China) Yu Y	21	21
(China) Zhao YL (China) Cheng S	8	15

Quarter-finals
1	(China) Zhang YW (China) Wei YL	19	21	19
8	(China) Du J (China) Yu Y	21	11	21

==== Section 2 ====
First Round
(China) Pan P (China) Tian Q	19	13
(Indonesia) L Natsir (Indonesia) V Marissa	21	21
6	(Japan) K Ogura (Japan) R Shiota	21	26	21
(England) J Nicholas (England) N Munt	13	28	11
(Chinese Taipei) Choi C-c (Chinese Taipei) Ku P-t	21	21
(Finland) A Nieminen (Netherlands) J Meulendijks	15	16

Second Round
4	(Malaysia) Wong P T (Malaysia) Chin E H	16	21	17
(Indonesia) L Natsir (Indonesia) V Marissa	21	17	21
6	(Japan) K Ogura (Japan) R Shiota	21	21
(Chinese Taipei) Choi C-c (Chinese Taipei) Ku P-t	16	15

Quarter-finals
(Indonesia) L Natsir (Indonesia) V Marissa	21	21
6	(Japan) K Ogura (Japan) R Shiota	10	10

=== Bottom half ===
==== Section 3 ====
First Round
(Indonesia) E Nursugianti (Indonesia) R Mundiasti	21	11	21
(Poland) K Augustyn (Poland) N Kostiuczyk	17	21	14
(Thailand) D Aroonkesorn (Thailand) K Voravichitchaikul
7	(England) G Emms (England) D Kellogg	w	/	o
(Germany) N Grether (Germany) J Schenk	21	20	18
(Denmark) L Frier Kristiansen (Denmark) K R Juhl	9	22	21
(Scotland) I Bankier (Scotland) E Mason	17	10
3	(Chinese Taipei) Chien Y-c (Chinese Taipei) Cheng W-h	21	21

Second Round
(Indonesia) E Nursugianti (Indonesia) R Mundiasti	16	15
7	(England) G Emms (England) D Kellogg	21	21
(Denmark) L Frier Kristiansen (Denmark) K R Juhl	21	12	21
3	(Chinese Taipei) Chien Y-c (Chinese Taipei) Cheng W-h	18	21	15

Quarter-finals
7	(England) G Emms (England) D Kellogg	21	21	21
(Denmark) L Frier Kristiansen (Denmark) K R Juhl	23	16	14

==== Section 4 ====
First Round
(Germany) K Poptrpwski (Germany) B Overzier
(France) É Eymard (France) W Rahmawati	w	/	o
(Japan) A Akao (Japan) T Matsuda
5	(China) Zhao TT (China) Yang W	w	/	o
(India) S Kurien (India) J Gutta	20	21	14
(Sweden) J Persson (Sweden) E Bergblom	22	11	21

Second Round
(France) É Eymard (France) W Rahmawati	10	15
5	(China) Zhao TT (China) Yang W	21	21
(Sweden) J Persson (Sweden) E Bergblom	12	14
2	(China) Gao L (China) Huang S	21	21

Quarter-finals
5	(China) Zhao TT (China) Yang W	21	21
2	(China) Gao L (China) Huang S	16	16

== Mixed doubles ==
=== Seeds ===
1. (England) Nathan Robertson / Gail Emms (semi-finals)
2. (China) Xie Zhongbo / Zhang Yawen (quarter-finals)
3. (China) Zheng Bo / Gao Ling (champions)
4. (Indonesia) Nova Widianto / Liliyana Natsir (semi-finals)
5. (Thailand) Sudket Prapakamol / Saralee Thungthongkam (quarter-finals)
6. (China) He Hanbin / Yu Yang (quarter-finals)
7. (England) Anthony Clark / Donna Kellogg (final)
8. (Denmark) Thomas Laybourn / Kamilla Rytter Juhl (quarter-finals)

=== Finals ===
Semi-finals
1	(England) Nathan Robertson (England) Gail Emms	18	12
3	(China) Zheng Bo (China) Gao Ling	21	21
4	(Indonesia) Nova Widianto (Indonesia) Liliyana Natsir	18	18
7	(England) Anthony Clark (England) Donna Kellogg	21	21

Final
3	(China) Zheng Bo (China) Gao Ling	21	21
7	(England) Anthony Clark (England) Donna Kellogg	16	17

=== Top half ===
==== Section 1 ====
First Round
1	(England) N Robertson (England) G Emms	15	21	21
(Germany) K Hopp (Germany) B Overzier	21	11	7
Q4	(China) Zhang W (China) Pan P	14	17
(China) Zhang J (China) Zhao TT	21	21
6	(China) He HB (China) Yu Y	21	21
(England) R Middleton (Scotland) E Mason	12	10
(China) Xu C (China) Zhang JW	10	21	21
Q3	(China) Shen Y (China) Tian Q	21	17	14

Second Round
1	(England) N Robertson (England) G Emms	21	21
(China) Zhang J (China) Zhao TT	16	6
6	(China) He HB (China) Yu Y	21	13	21
(China) Xu C (China) Zhang JW	15	21	12

Quarter-finals
1	(England) N Robertson (England) G Emms	21	20	21
6	(China) He HB (China) Yu Y	18	22	14

==== Section 2 ====
First Round
3	(China) Zheng B (China) Gao L	18	21	21
(Chinese Taipei) Fang C-m (Chinese Taipei) Cheng W-h	21	7	13
(Japan) K Masuda (Japan) M Maeda	16	18
(Chinese Taipei) Hsieh Y-h (Chinese Taipei) Chien Y-c	21	21
8	(Denmark) T Laybourn (Denmark) K R Juhl	21	21
(Indonesia) M Rijal (Indonesia) G Polii	19	14
(England) K Roebuck (England) N Munt	16	21	22
(England) R Blair (Scotland) I Bankier	21	17	20

Second Round
3	(China) Zheng B (China) Gao L	21	21
(Chinese Taipei) Hsieh Y-h (Chinese Taipei) Chien Y-c	10	15
8	(Denmark) T Laybourn (Denmark) K R Juhl	21	21
(England) K Roebuck (England) N Munt	17	11

Quarter-finals
3	(China) Zheng B (China) Gao L	22	21
8	(Denmark) T Laybourn (Denmark) K R Juhl	20	19

=== Bottom half ===
==== Section 3 ====
First Round
PFQ	(England) C Langridge (England) J Nicholas	19	21	13
(France) S Stoyanov (France) É Eymard	21	17	21
Q1	(China) Li R (China) Zhao YL	16	16
5	(Thailand) S Prapakamol (Thailand) S Thungthongkam	21	21
(Italy) K Raffeiner (Italy) A Allegrini	11	11
(Philippines) Kennevic Asuncion (Philippines) Kennie Asuncion	21	21
(Chinese Taipei) Chen H-l (Chinese Taipei) Chou C-c	7	11
4	(Indonesia) N Widianto (Indonesia) L Natsir	21	21

Second Round
(France) S Stoyanov (France) É Eymard	21	11	19
5	(Thailand) S Prapakamol (Thailand) S Thungthongkam	16	21	21
(Philippines) Kennevic Asuncion (Philippines) Kennie Asuncion	10	16
4	(Indonesia) N Widianto (Indonesia) L Natsir	21	21

Quarter-finals
5	(Thailand) S Prapakamol (Thailand) S Thungthongkam	17	16
4	(Indonesia) N Widianto (Indonesia) L Natsir	21	21

==== Section 4 ====
First Round
Q2	(China) Sun JJ (China) Cheng S	22	18	14
(Poland) R Mateusiak (Poland) N Kostiuczyk	20	21	21
(England) D Lindley (England) S Rayappan	14	21
7	(England) A Clark (England) D Kellogg	21	23
(Indonesia) F Limpele (Indonesia) V Marissa	21	21
(Germany) I Kindervater (Germany) K Piotrowski	12	14
(Japan) T Ōtsuka (Japan) S Suetsana	15	9
2	(China) Xie ZB (China) Zhang YW	21	21

Second Round
(Poland) R Mateusiak (Poland) N Kostiuczyk	10	21	22
7	(England) A Clark (England) D Kellogg	21	15	24
(Indonesia) F Limpele (Indonesia) V Marissa	21	13	19
2	(China) Xie ZB (China) Zhang YW	19	21	21

Quarter-finals
7	(England) A Clark (England) D Kellogg	10	21	21
2	(China) Xie ZB (China) Zhang YW	21	18	17
