= 2007 Dutch Open Grand Prix =

Tournament details
- Dates: October 16, 2007 – October 21, 2007
- Edition: 59th
- Level: Grand Prix
- Total prize money: US$50,000
- Venue: Topsportcentrum
- Location: Almere, Netherlands

Champions
- Men's singles: (Singapore) Kendrick Lee Yen Hui
- Women's singles: (China) Li Wenyan
- Men's doubles: (Indonesia) Yonathan Suryatama Dasuki (Indonesia) Rian Sukmawan
- Women's doubles: (Russia) Ekaterina Ananina (Russia) Anastasia Russkikh
- Mixed doubles: (Denmark) Rasmus Bonde (Denmark) Christinna Pedersen

The 2007 Dutch Open Grand Prix was a badminton tournament which took place in Almere, Netherlands from 16 to 21 October 2007. It had a total purse of $50,000.

== Tournament ==
The 2007 Dutch Open Grand Prix was the ninth tournament of the 2007 BWF Grand Prix Gold and Grand Prix and also part of the Dutch Open championships which has been held since 1931. This tournament was organized by the Dutch Badminton Association and sanctioned by the BWF.

=== Venue ===
This international tournament was held at Topsportcentrum in Almere, Netherlands.

=== Point distribution ===
Below is the point distribution for each phase of the tournament based on the BWF points system for the BWF Grand Prix event.

Winner	Runner-up	3/4	5/8	9/16	17/32	33/64	65/128	129/256
5,500	4,680	3,850	3,030	2,110	1,290	510	240	100

=== Prize money ===
The total prize money for this tournament was US$50,000. Distribution of prize money was in accordance with BWF regulations.

Event	Winner	Finals	Semi-finals	Quarter-finals	Last 16
Men's singles	$4,000	$2,000	$1,000	$500	$200
Women's singles	$3,450	$1,650	$900	$450	—N/a
Men's doubles	$3,600	$2,000	$1,200	$700	—N/a
Women's doubles	$3,050	$2,000	$1,100	$550	—N/a
Mixed doubles	$3,050	$2,000	$1,100	$550	—N/a

== Men's singles ==
=== Seeds ===
1. (Poland) Przemysław Wacha (final)
2. (Malaysia) Lee Tsuen Seng (semi-finals)
3. (Netherlands) Dicky Palyama (third round)
4. (Singapore) Kendrick Lee Yen Hui (champion)
5. (Malaysia) Roslin Hashim (quarter-finals)
6. (England) Andrew Smith (second round)
7. (Malaysia) Sairul Amar Ayob (quarter-finals)
8. (India) Anup Sridhar (third round)

=== Finals ===
Semi-finals
1	(Poland) Przemysław Wacha	21	20	23
Q4	(China) Wu Yunyong	12	22	21
4	(Singapore) Kendrick Lee Yen Hui	21	21
2	(Malaysia) Lee Tsuen Seng	16	19

Final
1	(Poland) Przemysław Wacha	22	11	18
4	(Singapore) Kendrick Lee Yen Hui	20	21	21

=== Top half ===
==== Section 1 ====
First round
(Canada) S Wojcikiewicz	22	21
(Austria) J Koch	20	16
Q3	(Indonesia) T Sugiarto	21	21
PFQ	(England) C Baxter	9	13

Second round
1	(Poland) P Wacha	21	21	21
Q1	(India) Parupalli K	16	23	15
(Czech Republic) J Fröhlich	21	13	13
(Canada) S Wojcikiewicz	16	21	21
8	(India) A Sridhar	20	21	21
(Japan) Y Nakanishi	22	13	16
Q7	(Germany) M Zwiebler	21	21
Q3	(Indonesia) T Sugiarto	12	14

Third round
1	(Poland) P Wacha	21	21
(Canada) S Wojcikiewicz	13	12
8	(India) A Sridhar	12	14
Q7	(Germany) M Zwiebler	21	21

Quarter-finals
1	(Poland) P Wacha	21	21
Q7	(Germany) M Zwiebler	10	13

==== Section 2 ====
First round
(Canada) A Dabeka	18	15
Q4	(China) Wu YY	21	21
(Sweden) M Sahlberg	23	21	16
(Denmark) P Mikkelsen	25	17	21

Second round
3	(Netherlands) D Palyama	19	21	21
Q6	(Indonesia) E Kurniawan	21	18	16
Q8	(Indonesia) A Yunus	12	21	16
Q4	(China) Wu YY	21	12	21
5	(Malaysia) R Hashim	7	21	21
(Germany) B Joppien	21	12	12
(France) E Kehlhoffner	21	13
(Denmark) P Mikkelsen	23	21

Third round
3	(Netherlands) D Palyama	16	19
Q4	(China) Wu YY	21	21
5	(Malaysia) R Hashim	21	21
(Denmark) P Mikkelsen	19	6

Quarter-finals
Q4	(China) Wu YY	20	23	21
5	(Malaysia) R Hashim	22	21	10

=== Bottom half ===
==== Section 3 ====
First round
(Republic of Ireland) S Evans	21	21
(Canada) B Milroy	17	16
(Germany) R Spitko	21	12	21
Q2	(France) B Leverdez	18	21	10

Second round
(Republic of Ireland) S Evans	21	21
(Portugal) M Vasconcelos	13	19
(Netherlands) E Pang	21	22
6	(England) A Smith	19	20
(Germany) R Spitko	18	8
(Czech Republic) P Koukal	21	21
PFQ	(Finland) V Lång	16	16
4	(Singapore) K Lee Y H	21	21

Third round
(Republic of Ireland) S Evans	21	16	14
(Netherlands) E Pang	18	21	21
(Czech Republic) P Koukal	24	19
4	(Singapore) K Lee Y H	26	21

Quarter-finals
(Netherlands) E Pang	19	19
4	(Singapore) K Lee Y H	21	21

==== Section 4 ====
First round
(India) C Anand	21	18	16
(Russia) S Pukhov	15	21	21
(Japan) S Sasaki	19	17
PFQ	(England) R Ouseph	21	21

Second round
(Russia) S Pukhov	21	15	21
(Denmark) K Ødum	19	21	10
Q5	(India) N Kanetkar	18	13
7	(Malaysia) S A Ayob	21	21
PFQ	(England) R Ouseph	19	22	21
(Ukraine) V Druzchenko	21	20	13
(Lithuania) K Navickas	13	21
2	(Malaysia) Lee T S	21	23

Third round
(Russia) S Pukhov	14	18
7	(Malaysia) S A Ayob	21	21
PFQ	(England) R Ouseph	13	20
2	(Malaysia) Lee T S	21	22

Quarter-finals
7	(Malaysia) S A Ayob	9	12
2	(Malaysia) Lee T S	21	21

== Women's singles ==
=== Seeds ===
1. (Netherlands) Yao Jie (quarter-finals)
2. (Germany) Juliane Schenk (semi-finals)
3. (Singapore) Li Li (semi-finals)
4. (Netherlands) Judith Meulendijks (final)
5. (Sweden) Sara Persson (withdrew)
6. (India) Saina Nehwal (quarter-finals)
7. (Indonesia) Adriyanti Firdasari (second round)
8. (Finland) Anu Nieminen (second round)

=== Finals ===
Semi-finals
PFQ	(China) Li Wenyan	21	21
3	(Singapore) Li Li	15	16
4	(Netherlands) Judith Meulendijks	23	21
2	(Germany) Juliane Schenk	21	13

Final
PFQ	(China) Li Wenyan	21	21
4	(Netherlands) Judith Meulendijks	18	19

=== Top half ===
==== Section 1 ====
First round
1	(Netherlands) Yao J	21	21
(Netherlands) R van Cutsen	12	13
(Slovenia) M Tvrdy	7	7
(Switzerland) J Cicognini	21	21
PFQ	(China) Li WY	21	21
Q4	(Bulgaria) L Zetchiri	13	15
(United States) E Lee	9	12
(Italy) A Allegrini	21	21

Second round
1	(Netherlands) Yao J	21	21
(Switzerland) J Cicognini	16	15
PFQ	(China) Li WY	21	21
(Italy) A Allegrini	10	15

Quarter-finals
1	(Netherlands) Yao J
PFQ	(China) Li WY	w	/	o

==== Section 2 ====
First round
3	(Singapore) Li L	21	21
(Canada) C Reid	5	9
(Ukraine) E Prus	21	21
(Iceland) R Ingólfsdóttir	18	17
6	(India) S Nehwal	21	23
Q2	(Indonesia) P Z Bernadet	19	21
(England) J Pittard	21	18	21
(Portugal) F Lamy	17	21	17

Second round
3	(Singapore) Li L	21	21
(Ukraine) E Prus	6	16
6	(India) S Nehwal	21	22
(England) J Pittard	10	20

Quarter-finals
3	(Singapore) Li L	24	21
6	(India) S Nehwal	22	9

=== Bottom half ===
==== Section 3 ====
First round
(Scotland) S Hughes	20	21	14
Q1	(Denmark) C Sørensen	22	14	21
(Canada) S MacMaster	12	17
8	(Finland) A Nieminen	21	21
(Spain) Y Martínez	9	10
(Austria) S Prutsch	21	21
(Peru) C Rivero	12	10
4	(Netherlands) J Meulendijks	21	21

Second round
Q1	(Denmark) C Sørensen	23	21
8	(Finland) A Nieminen	21	17
(Austria) S Prutsch	9	14
4	(Netherlands) J Meulendijks	21	21

Quarter-finals
Q1	(Denmark) C Sørensen	9	21	12
4	(Netherlands) J Meulendijks	21	8	21

==== Section 4 ====
First round
Q3	(Russia) E Ananina	14	21	22
(Portugal) T Santos	21	9	20
(Portugal) A Moura	14	10
7	(Indonesia) A Firdasari	21	21
(Ukraine) L Griga	15	21	21
(England) E Cann	21	17	15
(Czech Republic) K Ludíková	12	15
2	(Germany) J Schenk	21	21

Second round
Q3	(Russia) E Ananina	17	21	21
7	(Indonesia) A Firdasari	21	17	10
(Ukraine) L Griga	14	23	16
2	(Germany) J Schenk	21	21	21

Quarter-finals
Q3	(Russia) E Ananina	9	14
2	(Germany) J Schenk	21	21

== Men's doubles ==
=== Seeds ===
1. (Singapore) Hendri Saputra / Hendra Wijaya (semi-finals)
2. (Russia) Vitalij Durkin / Aleksandr Nikolaenko (semi-finals)
3. (United States) Howard Bach / Khan Malaythong (quarter-finals)
4. (Germany) Kristof Hopp / Ingo Kindervater (quarter-finals)
5. (Germany) Michael Fuchs / Roman Spitko (quarter-finals)
6. (Indonesia) Yonathan Suryatama Dasuki / Rian Sukmawan (champions)
7. (England) Robert Adcock / Robin Middleton (quarter-finals)
8. (Germany) Tim Dettmann / Johannes Schöttler (first round)

=== Finals ===
Semi-finals
1	(Singapore) Hendri Saputra (Singapore) Hendra Wijaya	15	12
(Indonesia) Fran Kurniawan (Indonesia) Rendra Wijaya	21	21
6	(Indonesia) Yonathan Suryatama Dasuki (Indonesia) Rian Sukmawan	21	23
2	(Russia) Vitalij Durkin (Russia) Aleksandr Nikolaenko	14	21

Final
(Indonesia) Fran Kurniawan (Indonesia) Rendra Wijaya	13	12
6	(Indonesia) Yonathan Suryatama Dasuki (Indonesia) Rian Sukmawan	21	21

=== Top half ===
==== Section 1 ====
First round
1	(Singapore) H Saputra (Singapore) H Wijaya	21	21
PFQ	(Germany) P Käsbauer (Germany) O Roth	9	10
(Germany) J Cassel (Germany) T Tesche	21	21
Q1	(Switzerland) A Dumartheray (Switzerland) S Razi	14	19
5	(Germany) M Fuchs (Germany) R Spitko	21	21
(England) A Ellis (Wales) M Lewis	16	16
SUB	(Russia) E Dremin (England) M Honey	13	13
(England) R Blair (England) D Lindley	21	21

Second round
1	(Singapore) H Saputra (Singapore) H Wijaya	21	21
(Germany) J Cassel (Germany) T Tesche	9	14
5	(Germany) M Fuchs (Germany) R Spitko	17	21	21
(England) R Blair (England) D Lindley	21	11	11

Quarter-finals
1	(Singapore) H Saputra (Singapore) H Wijaya	21	21
5	(Germany) M Fuchs (Germany) R Spitko	15	17

==== Section 2 ====
First round
3	(United States) H Bach (United States) K Malaythong	21	21
SUB	(Germany) M Reuter (Germany) J-S Schulz	15	10
(Netherlands) J Wouters (Netherlands) J de Ruiter	21	21
(Belgium) E Balligand (Belgium) L Devrye	19	9
8	(Germany) T Dettmann (Germany) J Schöttler	19	9
(Indonesia) F Kurniawan (Indonesia) R Wijaya	21	21
(Denmark) J Chemnitz (Denmark) M D Larsen	21	21
PFQ	(Sweden) M Fagerström (China) Zhang Y	17	14

Second round
3	(United States) H Bach (United States) K Malaythong	21	21
(Netherlands) J Wouters (Netherlands) J de Ruiter	9	16
(Indonesia) F Kurniawan (Indonesia) R Wijaya	14	21	21
(Denmark) J Chemnitz (Denmark) M D Larsen	21	15	15

Quarter-finals
3	(United States) H Bach (United States) K Malaythong	13	11
(Indonesia) F Kurniawan (Indonesia) R Wijaya	21	21

=== Bottom half ===
==== Section 3 ====
First round
(Australia) R Smith (Australia) G Warfe	18	18
(Scotland) A Bowman (England) K Roebuck	21	21
(England) C Adcock (England) D George	19	19
6	(Indonesia) Y S Dasuki (Indonesia) R Sukmawan	21	21
(Singapore) C Triyachart (Singapore) U K Yoga	15	21	21
(Netherlands) R Bosch (Netherlands) K Ridder	21	8	14
(Denmark) R Bonde (Denmark) K Hendriksen	12	17
4	(Germany) K Hopp (Germany) I Kindervater	21	21

Second round
(Scotland) A Bowman (England) K Roebuck	15	13
6	(Indonesia) Y S Dasuki (Indonesia) R Sukmawan	21	21
(Singapore) C Triyachart (Singapore) U K Yoga	11	21	9
4	(Germany) K Hopp (Germany) I Kindervater	21	18	21

Quarter-finals
6	(Indonesia) Y S Dasuki (Indonesia) R Sukmawan	21	21
4	(Germany) K Hopp (Germany) I Kindervater	13	10

==== Section 4 ====
First round
(Belgium) W Claes (Belgium) F Mawet	21	21
PFQ	(Belgium) F Gaspard (Belgium) J Gillis	11	11
(Austria) P Zauner (Austria) R Zirnwald	18	12
7	(England) R Adcock (England) R Middleton	21	21
(Bulgaria) S Makarski (Bulgaria) V Metodiev	20	21	21
Q2	(Germany) D Benz (Germany) F Schoppmann	22	17	15
SUB	(Germany) H Roffman (Germany) S Schöttler	19	20
2	(Russia) V Durkin (Russia) A Nikolaenko	21	22

Second round
(Belgium) W Claes (Belgium) F Mawet	16	21	10
7	(England) R Adcock (England) R Middleton	21	18	21
(Bulgaria) S Makarski (Bulgaria) V Metodiev	17	14
2	(Russia) V Durkin (Russia) A Nikolaenko	21	21

Quarter-finals
7	(England) R Adcock (England) R Middleton	17	14
2	(Russia) V Durkin (Russia) A Nikolaenko	21	21

== Women's doubles ==
=== Seeds ===
1. (Singapore) Jiang Yanmei / Li Yujia (semi-finals)
2. (Russia) Ekaterina Ananina / Anastasia Russkikh (champions)
3. (Russia) Valeria Sorokina / Nina Vislova (final)
4. (France) Élodie Eymard / Weny Rahmawati (withdrew)

=== Finals ===
Semi-finals
1	(Singapore) Jiang Yanmei (Singapore) Li Yujia	20	14
3	(Russia) Valeria Sorokina (Russia) Nina Vislova	22	21
(Singapore) Vanessa Neo (Singapore) Shinta Mulia Sari	12	16
2	(Russia) Ekaterina Ananina (Russia) Anastasia Russkikh	21	21

Final
3	(Russia) Valeria Sorokina (Russia) Nina Vislova	22	15	13
2	(Russia) Ekaterina Ananina (Russia) Anastasia Russkikh	20	21	21

=== Top half ===
==== Section 1 ====
First round
(Scotland) I Bankier (Scotland) E Mason	21	21
(England) S Bok (England) L Parker	16	17
(India) J Gutta (India) S Kurien	21	11	14
(Indonesia) J Novita (Indonesia) G Polii	19	21	21

Second round
1	(Singapore) Jiang YM (Singapore) Li YJ	21	21
(Scotland) I Bankier (Scotland) E Mason	14	19
(England) G White (England) M Agathangelou	13	16
(Indonesia) J Novita (Indonesia) G Polii	21	21

Quarter-finals
1	(Singapore) Jiang YM (Singapore) Li YJ	21	21
(Indonesia) J Novita (Indonesia) G Polii	17	6

==== Section 2 ====
First round
PFQ	(England) R Howard (England) H Olver	11	17
(England) N Munt (England) J Nicholas	21	21
(France) É Chanteur (France) L Choinet	10	10
Q2	(Netherlands) J Meulendijks (Netherlands) Yao J	21	21

Second round
3	(Russia) V Sorokina (Russia) N Vislova	21	21
(England) N Munt (England) J Nicholas	13	9
(Germany) G Köhler (Germany) M Peiffer	11	12
Q2	(Netherlands) J Meulendijks (Netherlands) Yao J	21	21

Quarter-finals
3	(Russia) V Sorokina (Russia) N Vislova	w	/	o
Q2	(Netherlands) J Meulendijks (Netherlands) Yao J

=== Bottom half ===
==== Section 3 ====
First round
(Indonesia) R P Dili (Indonesia) Yulianti	14	21	17
(Singapore) V Neo (Singapore) S M Sari	21	15	21
(England) S Rayappan (England) J Wallwork	19	21	21
Q1	(Japan) S Yamada (Japan) Y Wakita	21	16	19

Second round
(Singapore) V Neo (Singapore) S M Sari	21	21	21
(Indonesia) S P Itawati (Indonesia) M Jauhari	12	23	19
(England) S Rayappan (England) J Wallwork	11	21	26
PFQ	(Germany) J Köhler (Germany) A Lillie	21	14	24

Quarter-finals
(Singapore) V Neo (Singapore) S M Sari	21	21
(England) S Rayappan (England) J Wallwork	14	15

==== Section 4 ====
First round
(United States) E Lee (United States) M Mangkalakiri	21	24
(Canada) F McKee (Canada) C Reid	10	22
(Germany) C Mette (Germany) B Overzier	16	17
(Denmark) C Pedersen (Denmark) M Schjøtt-Kristensen	21	21

Second round
(United States) E Lee (United States) M Mangkalakiri	10	18
(Malaysia) Lim P S (Malaysia) Haw C H	21	21
(Denmark) C Pedersen (Denmark) M Schjøtt-Kristensen	11	13
2	(Russia) E Ananina (Russia) A Russkikh	21	21

Quarter-finals
(Malaysia) Lim P S (Malaysia) Haw C H	12	10
2	(Russia) E Ananina (Russia) A Russkikh	21	21

== Mixed doubles ==
=== Seeds ===
1. (Singapore) Hendri Saputra / Li Yujia (final)
2. (Germany) Ingo Kindervater / Kathrin Piotrowski (semi-finals)
3. (Singapore) Hendra Wijaya / Jiang Yanmei (first round)
4. (Germany) Kristof Hopp / Birgit Overzier (quarter-finals)
5. (England) David Lindley / Suzanne Rayappan (quarter-finals)
6. (France) Svetoslav Stoyanov / Élodie Eymard (withdrew)
7. (Russia) Aleksandr Nikolaenko / Nina Vislova (semi-finals)
8. (Russia) Vitalij Durkin / Valeria Sorokina (first round)

=== Finals ===
Semi-finals
1	(Singapore) Hendri Saputra (Singapore) Li Yujia	21	21	21
7	(Russia) Aleksandr Nikolaenko (Russia) Nina Vislova	16	23	11
(Denmark) Rasmus Bonde (Denmark) Christinna Pedersen	21	14	21
2	(Germany) Ingo Kindervater (Germany) Kathrin Piotrowski	17	21	17

Final
1	(Singapore) Hendri Saputra (Singapore) Li Yujia	16	14
(Denmark) Rasmus Bonde (Denmark) Christinna Pedersen	21	21

=== Top half ===
==== Section 1 ====
First round
1	(Singapore) H Saputra (Singapore) Li YJ	21	21
(Germany) M Fuchs (Germany) C Mette	14	10
(Denmark) M D Larsen (Denmark) M Schjøtt-Kristensen	21	15	21
(United States) H Bach (United States) E Lee	17	21	16
SUB	(Netherlands) R Bosch (Netherlands) E Muskens	27	21	18
(Belgium) W Claes (Belgium) N Descamps	25	23	21
Q1	(England) K Roebuck (England) J Wallwork	21	21
(Germany) J Schöttler (Germany) G Köhler	9	11

Second round
1	(Singapore) H Saputra (Singapore) Li YJ	21	21
(Denmark) M D Larsen (Denmark) M Schjøtt-Kristensen	11	15
(Belgium) W Claes (Belgium) N Descamps	15	18
Q1	(England) K Roebuck (England) J Wallwork	21	21

Quarter-finals
1	(Singapore) H Saputra (Singapore) Li YJ	21	21	21
Q1	(England) K Roebuck (England) J Wallwork	23	15	15

==== Section 2 ====
First round
4	(Germany) K Hopp (Germany) B Overzier	21	21
(England) C Adcock (England) G White	16	17
(Indonesia) T Ahmad (Indonesia) Yulianti	21	21
SUB	(England) A Ellis (England) J Nicholas	18	17
7	(Russia) A Nikolaenko (Russia) N Vislova	21	20	21
(England) R Blair (Scotland) I Bankier	19	22	15
PFQ	(Denmark) J Chemnitz (Denmark) M Røpke	16	14
(England) R Middleton (England) L Parker	21	21

Second round
4	(Germany) K Hopp (Germany) B Overzier	21	21
(Indonesia) T Ahmad (Indonesia) Yulianti	16	14
7	(Russia) A Nikolaenko (Russia) N Vislova	14	21	21
(England) R Middleton (England) L Parker	21	13	15

Quarter-finals
4	(Germany) K Hopp (Germany) B Overzier	20	21	18
7	(Russia) A Nikolaenko (Russia) N Vislova	22	19	21

=== Bottom half ===
==== Section 3 ====
First round
(Germany) T Dettmann (Germany) A Lillie	14	16
(Denmark) R Bonde (Denmark) C Pedersen	21	21
(England) R Adcock (Scotland) E Mason	14	22	23
8	(Russia) V Durkin (Russia) V Sorokina	21	20	21
Q2	(Germany) F Schoppmann (Germany) J Goliszewski	16	11
(China) Zhang Y (China) Cai JN	21	21
SUB	(Wales) M Lewis (England) N Munt	21	21
3	(Singapore) H Wijaya (Singapore) Jiang YM	17	15

Second round
(Denmark) R Bonde (Denmark) C Pedersen	21	13	21
(England) R Adcock (Scotland) E Mason	15	21	19
(China) Zhang Y (China) Cai JN	21	14	21
SUB	(Wales) M Lewis (England) N Munt	15	21	17

Quarter-finals
(Denmark) R Bonde (Denmark) C Pedersen	21	21
(China) Zhang Y (China) Cai JN	19	16

==== Section 4 ====
First round
(Singapore) C Triyachart (Singapore) S M Sari	21	19	21
(England) D George (England) M Agathangelou	14	21	19
(Russia) E Dremin (Russia) A Russkikh	18	21	17
5	(England) D Lindley (England) S Rayappan	21	18	21
(England) M Honey (England) H Olver	17	21	14
(Ukraine) V Atrashchenkov (Ukraine) E Prus	21	13	21
(Netherlands) J de Ruiter (Netherlands) I Vaessen	13	16
2	(Germany) I Kindervater (Germany) K Piotrowski	21	21

Second round
(Singapore) C Triyachart (Singapore) S M Sari	14	15
5	(England) D Lindley (England) S Rayappan	21	21
(Ukraine) V Atrashchenkov (Ukraine) E Prus	6	11
2	(Germany) I Kindervater (Germany) K Piotrowski	21	21

Quarter-finals
5	(England) D Lindley (England) S Rayappan	17	24
2	(Germany) I Kindervater (Germany) K Piotrowski	21	26

Preceded by 2007 Bitburger Open Grand Prix	2007 BWF Grand Prix Gold and Grand Prix; 2007 BWF season	Succeeded by 2007 Vietnam Open Grand Prix
