= 2005–06 European Badminton Circuit season =

The 2005–06 European Badminton Circuit season started in September 2005 and ended in April 2006.

== Results ==
=== Winners ===
Circuit	Men's singles	Women's singles	Men's doubles	Women's doubles	Mixed doubles
Belgian International	(Denmark) Anders Boesen	(Germany) Xu Huaiwen	(Germany) Ingo Kindervater (Germany) Kristof Hopp	(Germany) Juliane Schenk (Germany) Nicole Grether	(Germany) Kristof Hopp (Germany) Birgit Overzier
Czech International	(Poland) Przemysław Wacha	(Scotland) Susan Hughes	(England) Chris Langridge (England) Chris Tonks	(Poland) Nadieżda Kostiuczyk (Poland) Kamila Augustyn	(Sweden) Henri Hurskainen (Sweden) Johanna Persson
Slovak International	(Poland) Przemyslaw Wacha	(Bulgaria) Petya Nedelcheva	(Austria) Jürgen Koch (Austria) Peter Zauner	(Poland) Kamila Augustyn (Poland) Nadieżda Kostiuczyk	(Czech Republic) Jan Fröhlich (Czech Republic) Hana Milisová
Hungarian International	(India) Anup Sridhar	(Indonesia) Atu Rosalina	(Austria) Jürgen Koch (Austria) Peter Zauner	(Russia) Anastasia Russkikh (Russia) Ekaterina Ananina	(Russia) Vladimir Malkov (Russia) Anastasia Russkikh
Norwegian International	(Netherlands) Eric Pang	(Germany) Juliane Schenk	(Indonesia) Vidre Wibowo (Indonesia) Imam Sodikin	(Germany) Nicole Grether (Germany) Juliane Schenk	(Germany) Kristof Hopp (Germany) Birgit Overzier
Iceland International	(Denmark) Jens Kristian Leth	(Sweden) Sara Persson	(Denmark) Anders Kristiansen (Denmark) Simon Mollyhus	(Sweden) Johanna Persson (Sweden) Elin Bergblom	(Sweden) Henri Hurskainen (Sweden) Johanna Persson
Scottish Open	(Poland) Przemysław Wacha	(Russia) Ella Karachkova	(Indonesia) Imam Sodikin (Indonesia) Andi Tandaputra	(Russia) Valeria Sorokina (Russia) Nina Vislova	(England) Kristian Roebuck (England) Jenny Wallwork
Irish Open	(India) Chetan Anand	(Russia) Ella Karachkova	(France) Mihail Popov (France) Svetoslav Stoyanov	(England) Jenny Wallwork (England) Sarah Bok	(Germany) Roman Spitko (Germany) Carina Mette
Italian International	(Denmark) Joachim Persson	(Denmark) Tine Rasmussen	(Denmark) Simon Mollyhus (Denmark) Anders Kristiansen	(Russia) Nina Vislova (Russia) Valeria Sorokina	(Russia) Vitalij Durkin (Russia) Marina Yakusheva
Austrian International	(Denmark) Joachim Persson	(Germany) Juliane Schenk	(Austria) Jürgen Koch (Austria) Peter Zauner	(Switzerland) Cynthia Tuwankotta (Indonesia) Atu Rosalina	(Germany) Ingo Kindervater (Germany) Kathrin Piotrowski
Croatian International	(England) Andrew Smith	(Bulgaria) Petya Nedelcheva	(England) Chris Tonks (England) Chris Langridge	(England) Liza Parker (England) Jenny Day	(England) Chris Langridge (England) Jenny Day
Swedish International	(Russia) Evgenij Isakov	(England) Elizabeth Cann	(England) Simon Archer (England) Anthony Clark	(Japan) Miyuki Tai (Japan) Noriko Okuma	(Russia) Nikolai Zuev (Russia) Marina Yakusheva
Romanian International	(Czech Republic) Jan Vondra	(Bulgaria) Petya Nedelcheva	(Bulgaria) Vladimir Metodiev (Bulgaria) Stilian Makarski	(Bulgaria) Petya Nedelcheva (Bulgaria) Diana Dimova	(Bulgaria) Stilian Makarski (Bulgaria) Diana Dimova
Finnish International	(Denmark) Joachim Persson	(Germany) Petra Overzier	(Denmark) Jonas Rasmussen (Denmark) Peter Steffensen	(Russia) Ekaterina Ananina (Russia) Anastasia Russkikh	(Denmark) Jonas Rasmussen (Denmark) Britta Andersen
Portugal International	(Denmark) Michael Christensen	(Scotland) Yuan Wemyss	(Denmark) Anders Kristiansen (Denmark) Simon Mollyhus	(England) Liza Parker (England) Jenny Day	(Denmark) Rasmus Mangor Andersen (Denmark) Mie Schjott-Kristensen

=== Performance by countries ===
Tabulated below are the Circuit performances based on countries. Only countries who have won a title are listed:

No.	Team	BEL	CZE	SVK	HUN	NOR	ISL	SCO	IRL	ITA	AUS	CRO	SWE	ROM	FIN	POR	Total
1	Denmark	1					2			3	1				3	3	13
2	Germany	4				3			1		2				1		11
3	England		1					1	1			4	2			1	10
3	Russia				2			2	1	2			2		1		10
5	Bulgaria			1								1		4			6
6	Poland		2	2				1									5
7	Indonesia				1	1		1			1						4
7	Sweden		1				3										4
9	Austria			1	1						1						3
10	Czech Republic			1										1			2
10	India				1				1								2
10	Scotland		1													1	2
13	France								1								1
13	Japan												1				1
13	Netherlands					1											1
13	Switzerland										1						1
