= Emma Constable =

English badminton player

Personal information
- Born: 10 April 1975 (age 51) Essex, England

Sport
- Country: England
- Sport: Badminton
- Event: doubles

doubles
- BWF profile

Emma Constable (née Chaffin; born 10 April 1975) is a retired English badminton player. Her husband Mark Constable is also a former badminton player. Emma Constable became English Junior Champion in 1992. In 1996 she won the Finnish International and the Portugal International. In 2000 she was successful at the Scottish Open, Irish Open and Iceland International. In 2001 she won the Spanish International. She participated in the 1997 and 2001 World Badminton Championships.

== Achievements ==
=== IBF World Grand Prix ===
The World Badminton Grand Prix sanctioned by International Badminton Federation (IBF) since 1983.

Women's doubles
Year	Tournament	Partner	Opponent	Score	Result
2000	USA Open	(England) Suzanne Rayappan	(England) Gail Emms (England) Joanne Wright	7–15, 1–15	(silver) Runner-up
1995	Scottish Open	(England) Sara Hardaker	(Sweden) Catrine Bengtsson (Sweden) Maria Bengtsson	7–15, 5–15	(silver) Runner-up

=== IBF International ===
Women's doubles
Year	Tournament	Partner	Opponent	Score	Result
2001	Czech International	(England) Natalie Munt	(Poland) Kamila Augustyn (Belarus) Nadieżda Kostiuczyk	3–7, 2–7, 7–2, 5–7	(silver) Runner-up
2001	Spanish International	(England) Sara Hardaker	(England) Ella Miles (England) Sara Sankey	15–13, 15–12	(gold) Winner
2000	Irish International	(England) Sara Hardaker	(England) Felicity Gallup (England) Joanne Muggeridge	15–3, 12–15, 17–16	(gold) Winner
2000	Iceland International	(England) Suzanne Rayappan	(England) Liza Parker (England) Natalie Munt	15–12, 15–11	(silver) Runner-up
1997	La Chaux-de-Fonds International	(England) Sara Hardaker	(Netherlands) Monique Hoogland (Netherlands) Nicole van Hooren	12–15, 12–15	(silver) Runner-up
1996	La Chaux-de-Fonds International	(England) Sara Hardaker	(Netherlands) Brenda Conijn (Netherlands) Nicole van Hooren	6–15, 11–15	(silver) Runner-up
1996	Portugal International	(England) Tracey Hallam	(England) Alison Humby (England) Tanya Woodward	17–14, 4–15, 15–7	(gold) Winner

Mixed doubles
Year	Tournament	Partner	Opponent	Score	Result
2000	Scottish International	(England) David Lindley	(England) Peter Jeffrey (England) Suzanne Rayappan	15–13, 6–15, 15–13	(gold) Winner
2000	Iceland International	(England) David Lindley	(England) Graham Crow (England) Natalie Munt	15–3, 15–8	(gold) Winner
1996	Amor International	(England) James Anderson	(Denmark) Allan Borch (Denmark) Rikke Broen	10–15, 10–15	(silver) Runner-up
1996	La Chaux-de-Fonds International	(England) James Anderson	(Germany) Björn Siegemund (Germany) Karen Neumann	11–15, 5–15	(silver) Runner-up
1996	Portugal International	(England) James Anderson	(England) Nathan Robertson (England) Gail Emms	15–12, 13–15, 13–18	(silver) Runner-up
1996	Finnish International	(England) James Anderson	(Norway) Trond Wåland (Norway) Camilla Wright	15–13, 15–4	(gold) Winner
1994	Welsh International	(England) James Anderson	(England) Nick Ponting (England) Joanne Goode	15–18, 9–15	(silver) Runner-up
1994	Lausanne International	(England) James Anderson	(Russia) Pavel Uvarov (Bulgaria) Diana Koleva	15–2, 17–16	(gold) Winner
1993	Czech International	(England) James Anderson	(England) John Quinn (England) Nichola Beck	14–17, 2–15	(silver) Runner-up
