= Nikolai Zuyev (badminton) =

Russian badminton player

Nikolai Zuyev Николай Зуев
Personal information
- Born: Nikolay Vladimirovich Zuyev; Николай Владимирович Зуев; 7 May 1970 (age 56) Dnipro, Ukrainian SSR, Soviet Union
- Height: 1.80 m (5 ft 11 in)
- Weight: 83 kg (183 lb)

Sport
- Country: Russia
- Sport: Badminton
- Handedness: Right
- BWF profile
Medal record
Men's badminton
Representing Russia
World Cup
| Bronze medal – third place | 1996 Jakarta | Men's doubles |
European Championships
| Silver medal – second place | 1994 Den Bosch | Men's doubles |

Nikolay Vladimirovich Zuyev (Russian: Николай Владимирович Зуев; born 7 May 1970) is a Russian badminton player. He was part of the Russian Army team, and joined the national team in 1987.

Zuyev competed in badminton at the 1996 Summer Olympics in the men's doubles with partner Andrey Antropov. They were defeated by Antonius Ariantho and Denny Kantono of Indonesia (5–15, 1–15) in the quarter-finals, also in badminton at the 2004 Summer Olympics in the mixed doubles with partner Marina Yakusheva. They were defeated by Anggun Nugroho and Eny Widiowati of Indonesia in the round of 32. Zuyev got the silver medal in the men's doubles with Antropov at The 14th European Badminton Championships in Den Bosch, Netherlands, 10–17 April 1994. In his home country Russia he won 13 national titles until 2009 and three titles at the USSR National Badminton Championships.

== Achievements ==
=== World Cup ===
Men's doubles
| Year | Venue | Partner | Opponent | Score | Result |
|---|---|---|---|---|---|
| 1996 | Istora Senayan; Jakarta, Indonesia | (Russia) Andrey Antropov | (Indonesia) Sigit Budiarto (Indonesia) Rexy Mainaky | 15–9, 3–15, 3–15 | Bronze |

=== European Championships ===
Men's doubles
| Year | Venue | Partner | Opponent | Score | Result |
|---|---|---|---|---|---|
| 1994 | Maaspoort Sports and Events; Den Bosch, Netherlands | (Russia) Andrey Antropov | (England) Simon Archer (England) Chris Hunt | 16–18, 4–15 | Silver |

=== IBF World Grand Prix ===
The World Badminton Grand Prix was sanctioned by the International Badminton Federation from 1983 to 2006.

Men's doubles
| Year | Tournament | Partner | Opponent | Score | Result |
|---|---|---|---|---|---|
| 1993 | Scottish Open | (Russia) Sergey Melnikov | (Denmark) Jon Holst-Christensen (Denmark) Thomas Lund | 4–15, 7–15 | (silver) Runner-up |
| 1994 | Russian Open | (Russia) Sergey Melnikov | (Poland) Robert Mateusiak (Poland) Damian Pławecki | 15–9, 15–2 | (gold) Winner |
| 1994 | Scottish Open | (Russia) Andrey Antropov | (Denmark) Jens Eriksen (Denmark) Christian Jakobsen | 17–14, 13–15, 15–6 | (gold) Winner |
| 1995 | French Open | (Russia) Andrey Antropov | (Indonesia) Sigit Budiarto (Indonesia) Dicky Purwotjugiono | 8–15, 11–15 | (silver) Runner-up |
| 1996 | Russian Open | (Russia) Andrey Antropov | (China) Ge Cheng (China) Tao Xiaoqiang | 10–15, 17–15, 15–5 | (gold) Winner |

Mixed doubles
| Year | Tournament | Partner | Opponent | Score | Result |
|---|---|---|---|---|---|
| 1993 | Russian Open | (Russia) Marina Andrievskaya | (Russia) Sergey Melnikov (Russia) Marina Yakusheva | 17–14, 15–7 | (gold) Winner |
| 1995 | Thailand Open | (Russia) Marina Yakusheva | (South Korea) Park Joo-bong (South Korea) Ra Kyung-min | 1–15, 4–15 | (silver) Runner-up |

=== IBF International ===
Men's doubles
| Year | Tournament | Partner | Opponent | Score | Result |
|---|---|---|---|---|---|
| 1989 | Bulgarian International | (Soviet Union) Pavel Uvarov | (China) Yu Lizhi (China) Zheng Shoutai | 11–15, 16–17 | (silver) Runner-up |
| 1990 | Bulgarian International | (Soviet Union) Andrey Antropov | (Soviet Union) Igor Dmitriev (Soviet Union) Mikhail Korshuk | 15–7, 15–2 | (gold) Winner |
| 1992 | Portugal International | (Commonwealth of Independent States) Andrey Antropov | (England) Andy Goode (England) Chris Hunt | 11–15, 12–15 | (silver) Runner-up |
| 1992 | Russian International | (Commonwealth of Independent States) Andrey Antropov | (Commonwealth of Independent States) Vitaliy Shmakov (Commonwealth of Independent States) Pavel Uvarov | 15–7, 15–10 | (gold) Winner |
| 1992 | Irish International | (Commonwealth of Independent States) Andrey Antropov | (England) Chris Hunt (England) Julian Robertson | 12–15, 15–10, 18–15 | (gold) Winner |
| 1993 | Portugal International | (Russia) Andrey Antropov | (Hong Kong) Chan Kin Ngai (Hong Kong) Wong Wai Lap | 15–10, 7–15, 11–15 | (silver) Runner-up |
| 1993 | Amor International | (Russia) Andrey Antropov | (Germany) Stefan Frey (Germany) Stephan Kuhl | 15–3, 15–5 | (gold) Winner |
| 1993 | Wimbledon International | (Russia) Sergey Melnikov | (England) Simon Archer (England) Chris Hunt | 15–6, 7–15, 5–15 | (silver) Runner-up |
| 1993 | Welsh International | (Russia) Sergey Melnikov | (England) Michael Adams (England) Simon Archer | 3–15, 5–15 | (silver) Runner-up |
| 1994 | Austrian International | (Russia) Andrey Antropov | (Denmark) Thomas Damgaard (Denmark) Jan Jørgensen | 15–6, 15–10 | (gold) Winner |
| 1994 | Wimbledon International | (Russia) Andrey Antropov | (Wales) Neil Cottrill (England) John Quinn | 15–12, 15–7 | (gold) Winner |
| 1994 | Welsh International | (Russia) Andrey Antropov | (England) Nick Ponting (England) Julian Robertson | 15–2, 15–6 | (gold) Winner |
| 1995 | La Chaux-de-Fonds International | (Russia) Andrey Antropov | (Germany) Michael Helber (Germany) Michael Keck | 15–11, 15–12 | (gold) Winner |
| 1995 | Welsh International | (Russia) Andrey Antropov | (England) Julian Robertson (England) Nathan Robertson | 15–8, 15–8 | (gold) Winner |
| 2001 | Slovenian International | (Russia) Stanislav Pukhov | (Belgium) Wouter Claes (Belgium) Frédéric Mawet | 7–2, 1–7, 7–5, 7–3 | (gold) Winner |
| 2002 | Bulgarian International | (Russia) Stanislav Pukhov | (Russia) Evgenij Isakov (Russia) Andrej Zholobov | 15–5, 15–9 | (gold) Winner |
| 2002 | Slovak International | (Russia) Stanislav Pukhov | (Poland) Michał Łogosz (Poland) Robert Mateusiak | 15–10, 8–15, 15–12 | (gold) Winner |
| 2002 | Hungarian International | (Russia) Stanislav Pukhov | (Russia) Evgenij Isakov (Russia) Andrej Zholobov | 15–17, 15–3, 15–5 | (gold) Winner |
| 2002 | Welsh International | (Russia) Stanislav Pukhov | (England) Peter Jeffrey (England) Julian Robertson | 15–3, 15–11 | (gold) Winner |
| 2003 | French International | (Russia) Stanislav Pukhov | (Denmark) Joachim Fischer Nielsen (Denmark) Carsten Mogensen | 13–15, 9–15 | (silver) Runner-up |
| 2003 | Austrian International | (Russia) Stanislav Pukhov | (Poland) Michał Łogosz (Poland) Robert Mateusiak | 6–15, 17–16, 11–15 | (silver) Runner-up |
| 2003 | Spanish International | (Russia) Stanislav Pukhov | (Denmark) Mathias Boe (Denmark) Michael Lamp | 4–15, 9–15 | (silver) Runner-up |
| 2003 | Slovenian International | (England) Nicholas Kidd | (Slovenia) Aleš Murn (Slovenia) Andrej Pohar | 15–2, 15–7 | (gold) Winner |
| 2004 | Slovak International | (Russia) Sergey Ivlev | (Sweden) Imanuel Hirschfeldt (Sweden) Jörgen Olsson | 15–13, 6–15, 15–7 | (gold) Winner |
| 2004 | Hungarian International | (Russia) Sergey Ivlev | (Wales) Matthew Hughes (Wales) Martyn Lewis | 15–3, 15–2 | (gold) Winner |

Mixed doubles
| Year | Tournament | Partner | Opponent | Score | Result |
|---|---|---|---|---|---|
| 1989 | USSR International | (Soviet Union) Viktoria Pron | (Soviet Union) Vitaliy Shmakov (Soviet Union) Vlada Chernyavskaya | 9–15, 8–15 | (silver) Runner-up |
| 1990 | Austrian International | (Bulgaria) Diana Koleva | (Denmark) Christian Jakobsen (Denmark) Marlene Thomsen | 5–15, 15–11, 6–15 | (silver) Runner-up |
| 1990 | Bulgarian International | (Soviet Union) Irina Serova | (Poland) Jerzy Dołhan (Poland) Bożena Haracz | 15–7, 15–1 | (gold) Winner |
| 1991 | USSR International | (Soviet Union) Irina Serova | (Soviet Union) Vitaliy Shmakov (Soviet Union) Vlada Chernyavskaya | 15–5, 5–15, 12–15 | (silver) Runner-up |
| 1992 | Portugal International | (Commonwealth of Independent States) Marina Andrievskaya | (England) Andy Goode (England) Joanne Wright | 3–15, 10–15 | (silver) Runner-up |
| 1992 | Russian International | (Commonwealth of Independent States) Marina Yakusheva | (Commonwealth of Independent States) Vladimir Nikolenko (Commonwealth of Independent States) Irina Gritsenko | 15–3, 15–11 | (gold) Winner |
| 1993 | Portugal International | (Russia) Marina Yakusheva | (Hong Kong) Chan Siu Kwong (Hong Kong) Chung Hoi Yuk | 17–15, 15–11 | (gold) Winner |
| 1994 | Austrian International | (Russia) Marina Yakusheva | (Belarus) Vitaliy Shmakov (Belarus) Tatiana Gerassimovitch | 15–5, 15–12 | (gold) Winner |
| 1994 | Wimbledon International | (Russia) Marina Yakusheva | (England) John Quinn (England) Joanne Muggeridge | 7–15, 9–15 | (silver) Runner-up |
| 1995 | Wimbledon International | (Russia) Marina Yakusheva | (England) Ian Pearson (England) Joanne Davies | 12–15, 15–11, 5–15 | (silver) Runner-up |
| 1995 | Welsh International | (Russia) Marina Yakusheva | (England) Julian Robertson (England) Lorraine Cole | 15–11, 15–7 | (gold) Winner |
| 2001 | Slovenian International | (Russia) Marina Yakusheva | (Scotland) Russell Hogg (Scotland) Kirsteen McEwan | 7–5, 7–3, 7–2 | (gold) Winner |
| 2001 | Welsh International | (Russia) Marina Yakusheva | (Canada) Mike Beres (Canada) Kara Solmundson | 7–1, 5–7, 7–1 | (gold) Winner |
| 2002 | Bulgarian International | (Russia) Marina Yakusheva | (Bulgaria) Konstantin Dobrev (Bulgaria) Petya Nedelcheva | 4–11, 11–9, 11–7 | (gold) Winner |
| 2002 | Slovak International | (Russia) Marina Yakusheva | (Belarus) Andrey Konakh (Belarus) Nadieżda Kostiuczyk | 4–11, 5–11 | (silver) Runner-up |
| 2002 | Hungarian International | (Russia) Marina Yakusheva | (Russia) Sergey Ivlev (Russia) Natalia Gorodnicheva | 11–5, 8–11, 7–11 | (silver) Runner-up |
| 2002 | Scottish International | (Russia) Marina Yakusheva | (England) Robert Blair (England) Natalie Munt | 11–6, 12–13, 9–11 | (silver) Runner-up |
| 2002 | Welsh International | (Russia) Marina Yakusheva | (Wales) Matthew Hughes (England) Joanne Muggeridge | 11–4, 11–6 | (gold) Winner |
| 2003 | Slovenian International | (Russia) Marina Yakusheva | (England) Simon Archer (England) Donna Kellogg | 2–15, 16–17 | (silver) Runner-up |
| 2003 | Hungarian International | (Russia) Marina Yakusheva | (Ukraine) Dmitry Miznikov (Ukraine) Natalia Golovkina | 15–13, 15–1 | (gold) Winner |
| 2003 | Bitburger International | (Russia) Marina Yakusheva | (Sweden) Fredrik Bergström (Sweden) Johanna Persson | 15–13, 10–15, 13–15 | (silver) Runner-up |
| 2004 | Swedish International | (Russia) Marina Yakusheva | (Germany) Kristof Hopp (Germany) Kathrin Piotrowski | 15–5, 13–15, 11–15 | (silver) Runner-up |
| 2004 | French International | (Russia) Marina Yakusheva | (China) Xie Zhongbo (China) Yu Yang | 16–17, 9–15 | (silver) Runner-up |
| 2004 | Slovak International | (Russia) Marina Yakusheva | (England) Peter Jeffrey (England) Hayley Connor | 15–4, 15–2 | (gold) Winner |
| 2004 | Hungarian International | (Russia) Marina Yakusheva | (Malaysia) Ong Ewe Hock (Malaysia) Lim Pek Siah | 15–5, 9–15, 5–15 | (silver) Runner-up |
| 2005 | Swedish International | (Russia) Marina Yakusheva | (England) Kristian Roebuck (England) Liza Parker | 15–4, 15–8 | (gold) Winner |
