= Lorraine Cole =

English badminton player

Personal information
- Born: 20 September 1967 (age 59) Birmingham, England
- Height: 1.7 m (5 ft 7 in)

Sport
- Country: England
- Sport: Badminton

Doubles
- Highest ranking: 10 (Women's doubles); 12 (Mixed doubles)
- BWF profile

Lorraine Cole (born 20 September 1967) is a retired English badminton player.

== About ==
Cole is a former badminton player who also competed in javelin throw during her early junior career. She attended Kings Norton Mixed School and won the English schools U-17 National Javelin championships before later becoming the English Junior Javelin champion. She then chose badminton as her career and won the Worcestershire county badminton title. She then won the National championships and rose to become one of England's top players in both doubles categories. She was also once ranked No. 1 in Europe for Women's and Mixed doubles and achieved world rankings of No. 10 in Women's Doubles and No. 12 in Mixed Doubles. She won titles in Ireland, Czechia, Mauritius, Iceland, and Slovakia and competed in the World championships in 1997 and 1999. In 2006, she and her partner Tracey Dineen became European Senior Champions after defeating Poland's Dorota Grzejdak and Bożena Haracz in the final. After her playing career she coached British players at various levels; Worcestershire County coach, England U-19 National Coach, HPC Coach, GB Youth Olympic Coach, Sydney European Junior Champions Coach 2006, Coach to World Junior Silver Medalist 2007 etc.

== Achievements ==
=== IBF World Grand Prix ===
The World Badminton Grand Prix sanctioned by International Badminton Federation (IBF) since 1983.

Mixed doubles
Year	Tournament	Partner	Opponent	Score	Result
1995	Scottish Open	(England) Julian Robertson	(Denmark) Lars Pedersen (Denmark) Anne Mette Bille	14–17, 10–15	(silver) Runner-up

=== IBF International ===
Women's doubles
Year	Tournament	Partner	Opponent	Score	Result
1996	Mauritius International	(England) Justine Willmott	(Mauritius) Selvon Marudamuthu (Mauritius) Marie-Josephe Jean-Pierre	15–4, 15–10	(gold) Winner
1997	Welsh International	(England) Joanne Wright	(England) Sara Sankey (England) Ella Miles	5–15, 3–15	(silver) Runner-up
1998	Portugal International	(England) Rebecca Pantaney	(England) Tracy Dineen (England) Sara Hardaker	3–15, 15–7, 10–15	(silver) Runner-up
1998	Czech International	(England) Tracy Dineen	(England) Gail Emms (England) Joanne Wright	15–7, 15–6	(gold) Winner
1998	Slovak International	(England) Tracy Dineen	(England) Katy Brydon (England) Joanne Wright	15–13, 15–10	(gold) Winner
1998	Iceland International	(England) Tracy Dineen	(Iceland) Elsa Nielsen (Iceland) Brynja Pétursdóttir	15–10, 15–10	(gold) Winner
1998	Scottish International	(England) Tracy Dineen	(Denmark) Ann-Lou Jørgensen (Denmark) Mette Schjoldager	2–15, 11–15	(silver) Runner-up

Mixed doubles
Year	Tournament	Partner	Opponent	Score	Result
1995	Welsh International	(England) Julian Robertson	(Russia) Nikolai Zuyev (Russia) Marina Yakusheva	11–15, 7–15	(silver) Runner-up
1995	Irish International	(England) Julian Robertson	(England) Nathan Robertson (England) Gail Emms	15–4, 15–4	(gold) Winner
1996	Mauritius International	(England) Dave Wright	(England) Carl Fenton (England) Justine Willmott	15–4, 15–4	(gold) Winner
1998	Czech International	(England) Anthony Clark	(England) Ian Sullivan (England) Gail Emms	15–4, 15–13	(gold) Winner
1998	Slovak International	(England) Anthony Clark	(England) David Lindley (England) Joanne Wright	15–5, 15–3	(gold) Winner
1999	Irish International	(England) Anthony Clark	(Belgium) Ruud Kuijten (Belgium) Manon Albinus	15–7, 15–8	(gold) Winner
