= Liza Parker =

English badminton player

Personal information
- Born: 30 October 1980 (age 46) St Albans, southern Hertfordshire, England
- Height: 1.68 m (5 ft 6 in)

Sport
- Country: England
- Sport: Badminton
- Handedness: Right
- Retired: in 2008
- Highest ranking: 14 (XD, with Kristian Roebuck), 15 (WD, with Suzanne Rayappan)
- BWF profile
Medal record
Women's badminton
Representing England
European Junior Championships
Bronze medal – third place	1999 Glasgow	Girls' doubles

Liza Smith (née Parker; born 30 October 1980) is a retired English badminton player.

== Career summary ==
Smith played for almost 10 years in her career. Meantime she reached No. 14 in the world in mixed doubles and No. 15 in women's doubles as well as being No. 3 in England in women's doubles. Her best year on the international circuit was 2004 when she won both mixed and women's doubles titles at the Canadian Open as well as winning the Norwegian and Iceland women's doubles titles. She was also a Hertfordshire county stalwart and played for Redstar Mulhouse in France. She made her debut for country when she played women's doubles with Jo Davies against China in 1999 but only won a total of six caps. She was born in the era of other prominent doubles stars from England and wasn't fortunate enough to represent the country at the Olympics or Commonwealth games. She has also the degree in Physiotherapy from University of London.

== Achievements ==
=== European Junior Championships ===
Girls' doubles
Year	Venue	Partner	Opponent	Score	Result
1999	Kelvin Hall; Glasgow, Scotland	(England) Suzanne Rayappan	(Denmark) Karina Sørensen (Denmark) Helle Nielsen	9–15, 7–15	Bronze

=== IBF World Grand Prix ===
The World Badminton Grand Prix sanctioned by International Badminton Federation (IBF) since 1983.

Women's doubles
Year	Tournament	Partner	Opponent	Score	Result
2002	U.S. Open	(England) Suzanne Rayappan	(England) Natalie Munt (England) Joanne Wright	2–11, 4–4^{r}	(silver) Runner-up

=== IBF/BWF International ===
Women's doubles
Year	Tournament	Partner	Opponent	Score	Result
1999	Czech International	(England) Suzanne Rayappan	(Germany) Anne Hönscheid (Germany) Wiebke Schrempf	17–14, 15–8	(gold) Winner
2000	Iceland International	(England) Natalie Munt	(England) Emma Constable (England) Suzanne Rayappan	15–12, 15–11	(gold) Winner
2001	Bulgarian International	(England) Suzanne Rayappan	(England) Emma Hendry (England) Kelly Matthews	7–0, 8–7, 7–5	(gold) Winner
2001	Welsh International	(England) Suzanne Rayappan	(England) Ella Miles (England) Sara Sankey	5–7, 8–6, 4–7, 4–7	(silver) Runner-up
2002	Canadian International	(England) Suzanne Rayappan	(England) Natalie Munt (England) Joanne Wright	13–10, 11–6	(gold) Winner
2002	Welsh International	(England) Suzanne Rayappan	(England) Joanne Wright (England) Ella Tripp	7–11, 11–13	(silver) Runner-up
2003	Irish International	(England) Suzanne Rayappan	(Germany) Nicole Grether (Germany) Juliane Schenk	0–15, 1–15	(silver) Runner-up
2004	Austrian International	(England) Suzanne Rayappan	(Bulgaria) Neli Boteva (Bulgaria) Petya Nedelcheva	9–15, 14–15	(silver) Runner-up
2004	Canadian International	(England) Suzanne Rayappan	(Canada) Helen Nichol (Canada) Charmaine Reid	15–11, 15–0	(gold) Winner
2004	Norwegian International	(England) Suzanne Rayappan	(Scotland) Michelle Douglas (Scotland) Yuan Wemyss	15–0, 13–15, 15–8	(gold) Winner
2004	Iceland International	(England) Suzanne Rayappan	(Sweden) Lina Alfredsson (Sweden) Lina Uhac	15–9, 13–15, 15–10	(gold) Winner
2006	Croatian International	(England) Jenny Day	(Poland) Małgorzata Kurdelska (Poland) Paulina Matusewicz	21–17, 22–20	(gold) Winner
2006	Portugal International	(England) Jenny Day	(Denmark) Line Damkjær Kruse (Denmark) Marie Røpke	21–13, 21–9	(gold) Winner
2007	Portugal International	(England) Sarah Bok	(England) Suzanne Rayappan (England) Jenny Wallwork	14–21, 15–21	(silver) Runner-up

Mixed doubles
Year	Tournament	Partner	Opponent	Score	Result
2000	Austrian International	(England) David Lindley	(Sweden) Ola Molin (Sweden) Johanna Persson	9–15, 15–12, 9–15	(silver) Runner-up
2001	La Chaux-de-Fonds	(England) Paul Trueman	(England) Peter Jeffrey (England) Suzanne Rayappan	3–7, 2–7, 7–4, 4–7	(silver) Runner-up
2001	Bulgarian International	(England) Paul Trueman	(England) Robert Blair (England) Natalie Munt	7–4, 7–4, 2–7, ?, ?	(silver) Runner-up
2002	Canadian International	(England) David Lindley	(England) Kristian Roebuck (England) Natalie Munt	8–11, 6–11	(silver) Runner-up
2003	Norwegian International	(England) Kristian Roebuck	(South Korea) Lee Jae-jin (South Korea) Lee Eun-woo	16–17, 2–15	(silver) Runner-up
2004	Canadian International	(England) Kristian Roebuck	(England) David Lindley (England) Suzanne Rayappan	15–0, 15–6	(gold) Winner
2004	Norwegian International	(England) Kristian Roebuck	(Sweden) Fredrik Bergström (Sweden) Johanna Persson	17–16, 4–15, 10–15	(silver) Runner-up
2004	Malaysian Satellite	(England) Kristian Roebuck	(New Zealand) Daniel Shirley (New Zealand) Sara Runesten-Petersen	3–15, 3–15	(silver) Runner-up
2005	Swedish International	(England) Kristian Roebuck	(Russia) Nikolai Zuyev (Russia) Marina Yakusheva	4–15, 8–15	(silver) Runner-up
2006	Czech International	(England) Robin Middleton	(Denmark) Rasmus Bonde (Denmark) Christinna Pedersen	21–16, 21–12	(gold) Winner
2007	Dutch International	(England) Robin Middleton	(England) Kristian Roebuck (England) Natalie Munt	17–21, 21–12, 21–15	(gold) Winner

BWF International Challenge tournament
BWF International Series tournament
