= David Lindley (badminton) =

English badminton player and coach (born 1979)

Personal information
- Born: 23 April 1979 (age 47)
- Height: 1.75 m (5 ft 9 in)

Sport
- Country: England
- Sport: Badminton

Men's & mixed doubles
- Highest ranking: 43 (MD 8 October 2009); 45 (XD 8 October 2009)
- BWF profile
Medal record
Men's badminton
Representing England
Sudirman Cup
Bronze medal – third place	2007 Glasgow	Mixed team
European Mixed Team Championships
Silver medal – second place	2008 Herning	Mixed team
Bronze medal – third place	2006 Den Bosch	Mixed team
European Men's Team Championships
Silver medal – second place	2008 Almere	Men's team
Bronze medal – third place	2006 Thessalonica	Men's team
European Junior Championships
Bronze medal – third place	1997 Nymburk	Mixed doubles

David Lindley (born 23 April 1979) is an English badminton player and coach. The right-handler, Lindley started playing badminton at aged six, and in the junior event, he becoming boys' doubles U-19 national champion in 1997 and 1998. Lindley junior also won the mixed doubles bronze medal at the 1997 European Junior Championships in Nymburk, Czech Republic.

In the international event, he won double title at the 2000 Scottish and Iceland International, and at the 2006 Slovak International tournaments in the men's and mixed doubles event. In the national event, Lindley who represented Nottinghamshire, was the men's doubles finalist at the national championships in 2004 partnered with Kristian Roebuck, 2006 with Simon Archer, 2007 with Chris Langridge, and in 2008 with Richard Eidestedt, Now he work as assistant pathway coach at the England national badminton team.

== Achievements ==
=== European Junior Championships ===
Mixed doubles
Year	Venue	Partner	Opponent	Score	Result
1997	Nymburk, Czech Republic	(England) Donna Kellogg	(Denmark) Kristian Langbak (Denmark) Jane F. Bramsen	9–15, 9–15	Bronze

=== BWF Grand Prix ===
The BWF Grand Prix has two levels: Grand Prix and Grand Prix Gold. It is a series of badminton tournaments, sanctioned by Badminton World Federation (BWF) since 2007. The World Badminton Grand Prix sanctioned by International Badminton Federation (IBF) since 1983.

Men's doubles
Year	Tournament	Partner	Opponent	Score	Result
2007	Bitburger Open	(England) Robert Blair	(Denmark) Mathias Boe (Denmark) Carsten Mogensen	17–21, 15–21	(silver) Runner-up

Mixed doubles
Year	Tournament	Partner	Opponent	Score	Result
2004	U.S. Open	(England) Suzanne Rayappan	(Chinese Taipei) Lin Wei-hsiang (Chinese Taipei) Cheng Wen-hsing	5–15, 7–15	(silver) Runner-up

BWF Grand Prix Gold tournament
BWF Grand Prix tournament

=== BWF International Challenge/Series ===
Men's doubles
Year	Tournament	Partner	Opponent	Score	Result
2009	Swedish International	(England) Chris Langridge	(Japan) Naoki Kawamae (Japan) Shoji Sato	21–15, 14–21, 17–21	(silver) Runner-up
2008	Scottish International	(England) Chris Langridge	(England) Richard Eidestedt (England) Andrew Ellis	19–21, 21–16, 16–21	(silver) Runner-up
2007	Scottish International	(England) Robert Blair	(Russia) Vitalij Durkin (Russia) Alexandr Nikolaenko	21–18, 21–12	(gold) Winner
2006	Slovak International	(England) Chris Langridge	(England) Dean George (England) Chris Tonks	21–12, 21–11	(gold) Winner
2005	Italian International	(England) Simon Archer	(Denmark) Simon Mollyhus (Denmark) Anders Kristiansen	10–15, 15–9, 13–15	(silver) Runner-up
2004	Norwegian International	(England) Kristian Roebuck	(Germany) Kristof Hopp (Germany) Ingo Kindervater	14–15, 13–15	(silver) Runner-up
2004	Canadian International	(England) Kristian Roebuck	(England) Ian Palethorpe (England) Paul Trueman	8–15, 15–13, 12–15	(silver) Runner-up
2003	Iceland International	(England) Kristian Roebuck	(Denmark) Joachim Fischer Nielsen (Denmark) Jesper Larsen	8–15, 9–15	(silver) Runner-up
2003	Norwegian International	(England) Kristian Roebuck	(South Korea) Lee Jae-jin (South Korea) Hwang Ji-man	10–15, 2–15	(silver) Runner-up
2001	French International	(England) Peter Jeffrey	(France) Vincent Laigle (Bulgaria) Svetoslav Stoyanov	1–7, 2–7, 2–7	(silver) Runner-up
2000	Iceland International	(England) Peter Jeffrey	(England) Stephen Foster (England) Ian Palethorpe	15–10, 9–15, 15–11	(gold) Winner
2000	Scottish International	(England) Peter Jeffrey	(Japan) Yousuke Nakanishi (Japan) Shinya Ohtsuka	15–7, 12–15, 15–12	(gold) Winner
1998	Spanish International	(England) Michael Scholes	(France) Manuel Dubrulle (France) Vincent Laigle	9–15, 11–15	(silver) Runner-up

Mixed doubles
Year	Tournament	Partner	Opponent	Score	Result
2006	Slovak International	(England) Suzanne Rayappan	(England) Matthew Honey (England) Heather Olver	21–12, 21–19	(gold) Winner
2004	Canadian International	(England) Suzanne Rayappan	(England) Kristian Roebuck (England) Liza Parker	0–15, 6–15	(silver) Runner-up
2002	Canadian International	(England) Liza Parker	(England) Kristian Roebuck (England) Natalie Munt	8–11, 6–11	(silver) Runner-up
2000	Iceland International	(England) Emma Constable	(England) Graham Crow (England) Natalie Munt	15–3, 15–8	(gold) Winner
2000	Scottish International	(England) Emma Constable	(England) Peter Jeffrey (England) Suzanne Rayappan	15–13, 6–15, 15–13	(gold) Winner
2000	Austrian International	(England) Liza Parker	(Sweden) Ola Molin (Sweden) Johanna Persson	9–15, 15–12, 9–15	(silver) Runner-up
1998	Slovak International	(England) Joanne Wright	(England) Anthony Clark (England) Lorraine Cole	5–15, 3–15	(silver) Runner-up

BWF International Challenge tournament
BWF International Series tournament
