= Kristian Roebuck =

English badminton player (born 1981)

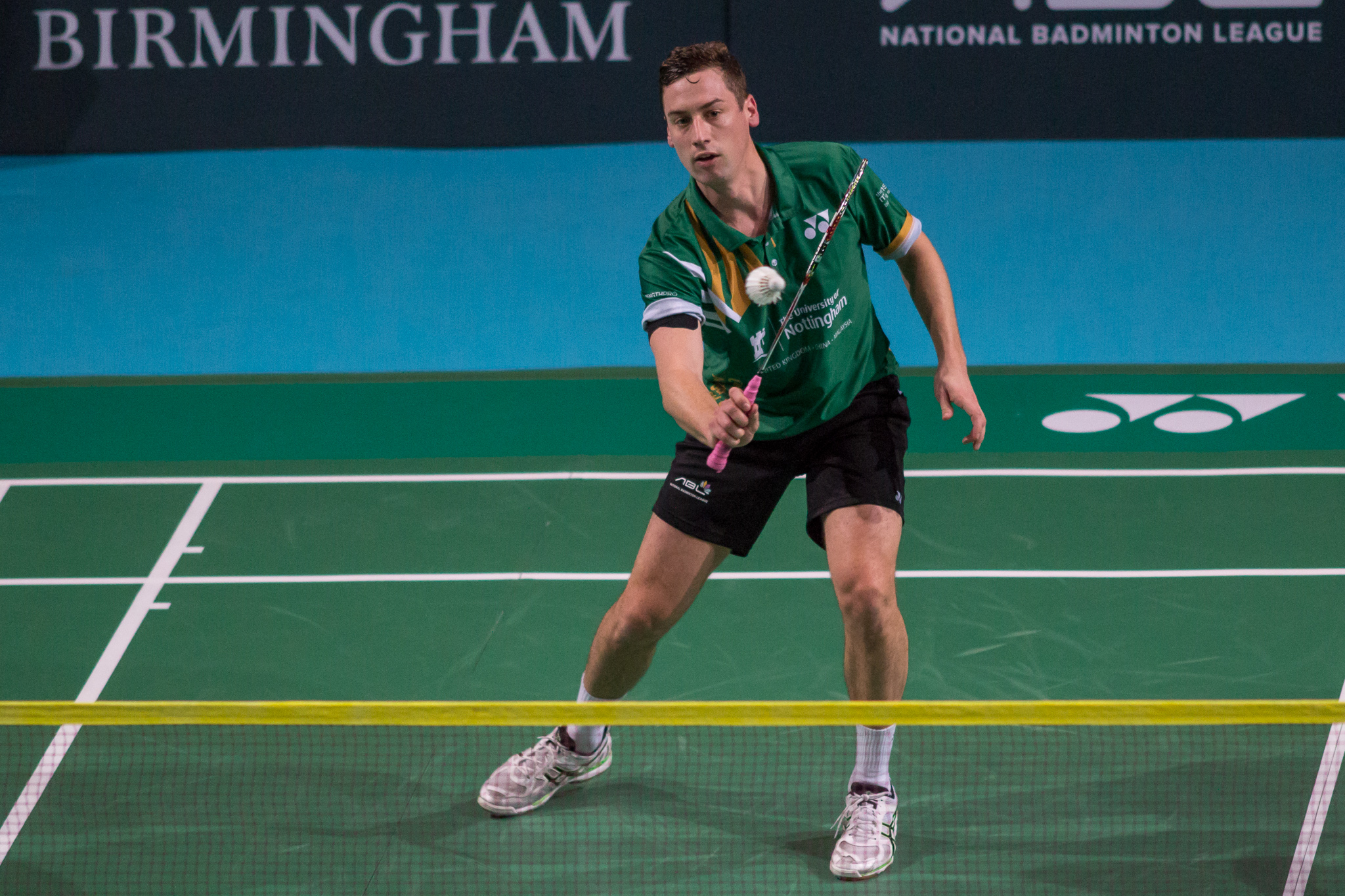

Personal information
- Born: 24 December 1981 (age 44) Derbyshire, England
- Height: 183 cm (6 ft 0 in)

Sport
- Country: England
- Sport: Badminton
- Handedness: Right

Doubles
- Highest ranking: 14 (XD)
- BWF profile
Medal record
Men's badminton
Representing England
Sudirman Cup
Bronze medal – third place	2007 Glasgow	Mixed team
European Junior Championships
Bronze medal – third place	1999 Glasgow	Boys' doubles

Kristian Roebuck (born 24 December 1981) is an English badminton player.

== Achievements ==
=== European Junior Championships ===
Boys' doubles
Year	Venue	Partner	Opponent	Score	Result
1999	Kelvin Hall; Glasgow, Scotland	(England) Oliver Bush	(Denmark) Kasper Jensen (Denmark) Mathias Boe	15–12, 1–15, 10–15	Bronze

=== IBF/BWF International ===
Men's doubles
Year	Tournament	Partner	Opponent	Score	Result
2001	Bulgarian International	(England) Paul Trueman	(England) Ian Palethorpe (England) Peter Jeffrey	5–7, 7–2, 1–7, ?–?, ?–?	(silver) Runner-up
2003	Norwegian International	(England) David Lindley	(South Korea) Hwang Ji-man (South Korea) Lee Jae-jin	10–15, 2–15	(silver) Runner-up
2003	Iceland International	(England) David Lindley	(Denmark) Jesper Larsen (Denmark) Joachim Fischer Nielsen	8–15, 9–15	(silver) Runner-up
2003	Welsh International	(England) Ashley Thilthorpe	(England) Chris Langridge (England) Robin Middleton	15–9, 17–16	(gold) Winner
2004	Canadian International	(England) David Lindley	(England) Ian Palethorpe (England) Paul Trueman	8–15, 15–13, 12–15	(silver) Runner-up
2004	Norwegian International	(England) David Lindley	(Germany) Ingo Kindervater (Germany) Kristof Hopp	14–15, 13–15	(silver) Runner-up
2006	Croatian International	(England) Ian Palethorpe	(England) Chris Langridge (England) Chris Tonks	21–23, 21–15, 20–22	(silver) Runner-up
2007	Holland Open	(Scotland) Robert Bowman	(England) Robin Middleton (England) Robert Adcock	21–11, 21–9	(gold) Winner

Mixed doubles
Year	Tournament	Partner	Opponent	Score	Result
2001	Czech International	(England) Natalie Munt	(Czech Republic) Jan Vondra (Czech Republic) Markéta Koudelková	7–1, 7–2, 7–4	(gold) Winner
2002	Canadian International	(England) Natalie Munt	(England) David Lindley (England) Liza Parker	11–8, 11–6	(gold) Winner
2003	Norwegian International	(England) Liza Parker	(South Korea) Lee Jae-jin (South Korea) Lee Eun-woo	16–17, 2–15	(silver) Runner-up
2004	Canadian International	(England) Liza Parker	(England) David Lindley (England) Suzanne Rayappan	15–0, 15–6	(gold) Winner
2004	Norwegian International	(England) Liza Parker	(Sweden) Fredrik Bergström (Sweden) Johanna Persson	17–16, 4–15, 10–15	(silver) Runner-up
2004	Malaysian Satellite	(England) Liza Parker	(New Zealand) Daniel Shirley (New Zealand) Sara Runesten-Petersen	3–15, 3–15	(silver) Runner-up
2005	Swedish International	(England) Liza Parker	(Russia) Nikolai Zuyev (Russia) Marina Yakusheva	4–15, 8–15	(silver) Runner-up
2005	Scottish International	(England) Jenny Wallwork	(Denmark) Rasmus Mangor Andersen (Russia) Anastasia Russkikh	15–8, 14–17, 15–5	(gold) Winner
2006	Croatian International	(England) Jenny Wallwork	(England) Chris Langridge (England) Jenny Day	18–21, 22–24	(silver) Runner-up
2006	Welsh International	(England) Natalie Munt	(England) Dean George (England) Suzanne Rayappan	Walkover	(gold) Winner
2007	Holland Open	(England) Natalie Munt	(England) Robin Middleton (England) Liza Parker	21–17, 12–21, 15–21	(silver) Runner-up
