= Natalie Munt =

English badminton player (born 1977)

Personal information
- Born: 8 November 1977 (age 49) Hertford, England
- Height: 1.65 m (5 ft 5 in)
- Weight: 55 kg (121 lb)

Sport
- Country: England
- Sport: Badminton
- Handedness: Right
- Coached by: Julian Robertson

Women's & mixed doubles
- Highest ranking: 6 (in WD); 19 (in XD)
- BWF profile
Medal record
Women's badminton
Representing England
Sudirman Cup
Bronze medal – third place	2007 Glasgow	Mixed team
European Women's Team Championships
Silver medal – second place	2006 Thessaloniki	Women's team

Natalie Munt (born 8 November 1977) is a badminton player from the United Kingdom who currently resides in Watford. She participated in the 2004 Summer Olympics partnering Robert Blair in the mixed doubles.

== Achievements ==
=== IBF/BWF World Grand Prix ===
The BWF Grand Prix had two levels, the Grand Prix and Grand Prix Gold. It was a series of badminton tournaments sanctioned by the Badminton World Federation (BWF) and played between 2007 and 2017. The World Badminton Grand Prix was sanctioned by the International Badminton Federation from 1983 to 2006.

Women's doubles
Year	Tournament	Partner	Opponent	Score	Result
2002	U.S. Open	(England) Joanne Nicholas	(England) Liza Parker (England) Suzanne Rayappan	11–2, 4–4 retired	(gold) Winner
2007	Bitburger Open	(England) Joanne Nicholas	(China) Yang Wei (China) Zhang Jiewen	11–21, 10–21	(silver) Runner-up

Mixed doubles
Year	Tournament	Partner	Opponent	Score	Result
2004	Indonesia Open	(England) Robert Blair	(China) Zhang Jun (China) Gao Ling	9–15, 9–15	(silver) Runner-up
2005	Thessaloniki World Grand Prix	(England) Robert Blair	(England) Anthony Clark (England) Donna Kellogg	4–15, 15–6, 13–15	(silver) Runner-up
2006	Swiss Open	(England) Robert Blair	(England) Nathan Robertson (England) Gail Emms	17–14, 7–15, 2–15	(silver) Runner-up

BWF Grand Prix Gold tournament
BWF Grand Prix tournament

=== IBF/BWF International ===
Women's doubles
Year	Tournament	Partner	Opponent	Score	Result
2000	Iceland International	(England) Liza Parker	(England) Emma Constable (England) Suzanne Rayappan	15–12, 15–11	(gold) Winner
2001	Czech International	(England) Emma Constable	(Poland) Kamila Augustyn (Belarus) Nadieżda Kostiuczyk	3–7, 2–7, 7–2, 5–7	(silver) Runner-up
2002	Canadian Open	(England) Joanne Nicholas	(England) Liza Parker (England) Suzanne Rayappan	10–13, 6–11	(silver) Runner-up
2006	Welsh International	(England) Mariana Agathangelou	(England) Emma Constable (England) Suzanne Rayappan	walkover	(gold) Winner
2007	Spanish International	(England) Joanne Nicholas	(Germany) Nicole Grether (Germany) Juliane Schenk	11–21, 22–20, 23–25	(silver) Runner-up
2007	Belgian International	(England) Joanne Nicholas	(England) Jenny Wallwork (Scotland) Sarah Bok	21–17, 21–14	(gold) Winner

Mixed doubles
Year	Tournament	Partner	Opponent	Score	Result
2000	Iceland International	(England) Graham Crow	(England) David Lindley (England) Emma Constable	15–12, 15–11	(gold) Winner
2001	Czech International	(England) Kristian Roebuck	(Czech Republic) Jan Vondra (Czech Republic) Markéta Koudelková	7–1, 7–2, 7–4	(gold) Winner
2001	Bulgarian International	(England) Robert Blair	(England) Paul Trueman (England) Liza Parker	4–7, 4–7, 7–2, –, –	(gold) Winner
2001	Scottish International	(England) Robert Blair	(Canada) William Milroy (Canada) Denyse Julien	8–6, 7–1, 8–6	(gold) Winner
2001	Irish International	(England) Robert Blair	(Denmark) Bo Rafn (Denmark) Helle Nielsen	7–4, 3–7, 7–1, 7–5	(gold) Winner
2002	Canadian International	(England) Kristian Roebuck	(England) David Lindley (England) Liza Parker	11–8, 11–6	(gold) Winner
2002	Scottish International	(England) Robert Blair	(Russia) Nikolai Zuyev (Russia) Marina Yakusheva	6–11, 13–12, 11–9	(gold) Winner
2003	Spanish International	(England) Robert Blair	(Sweden) Jörgen Olsson (Sweden) Frida Andreasson	17–16, 15–10	(gold) Winner
2006	Welsh International	(England) Kristian Roebuck	(England) Dean George (England) Suzanne Rayappan	walkover	(gold) Winner
2007	Holland Open	(England) Kristian Roebuck	(England) Robin Middleton (England) Liza Parker	21–17, 12–21, 15–21	(silver) Runner-up

BWF International Challenge tournament
BWF International Series tournament
BWF Future Series tournament
