= Fredrik Bergström (badminton) =

Swedish badminton player

Personal information
- Full name: Lars Fredrik Bergström
- Born: 19 March 1975 (age 51) Ålidhem, Sweden

Sport
- Country: Sweden
- Sport: Badminton
- Event: Men's & Mixed doubles

Men's & Mixed doubles
- BWF profile
Medal record
Men's badminton
Representing Sweden
European Championships
Bronze medal – third place	2004 Geneva	Mixed doubles

Lars Fredrik Bergström (born 19 March 1975) is a male badminton player from Sweden.

Bergstrom competed in badminton at the 2004 Summer Olympics in mixed doubles with partner Johanna Persson. They defeated Mike Beres and Jody Patrick of Canada in the first round and Sudket Prapakamol and Saralee Thungthongkam of Thailand in the second. In the quarterfinals, Bergström and Persson lost to Zhang Jun and Gao Ling of China 15–3, 15–1.
