= Johanna Persson =

Swedish badminton player

Personal information
- Born: Johanna Sofia Elisabeth Persson; 25 December 1978 (age 47) Danderyd, Stockholm, Sweden
- Height: 1.62 m (5 ft 4 in)
- Weight: 57 kg (126 lb)

Sport
- Country: Sweden
- Sport: Badminton
- Handedness: Right
- Event: Women's & mixed doubles

Women's & mixed doubles
- BWF profile
Medal record
Women's badminton
Representing Sweden
European Championships
| Bronze medal – third place | 2008 Herning | Women's doubles |
| Bronze medal – third place | 2006 Den Bosch | Women's doubles |
| Bronze medal – third place | 2004 Geneva | Mixed doubles |

Johanna Sofia Elisabeth Persson (born 25 December 1978) is a former Swedish badminton player.

== Career ==
Persson started her junior career in Täby Badmintonförening (now Göteborgs BK), and won her first national junior title in 1993 in the U-14 girls' singles, doubles, and mixed doubles event. She won the Swedish National senior title 11 times from 2002 to 2012, 6 in the women's doubles, and 5 in the mixed doubles. She won the bronze medals at the 2004 European Championships in the mixed doubles event partnered with Fredrik Bergström, and also at the 2006 and 2008 European Championship in the women's doubles event with Elin Bergblom. Persson competed in badminton at the 2004 Summer Olympics in the mixed doubles with partner Bergström. They defeated Mike Beres and Jody Patrick of Canada in the first round and Sudket Prapakamol and Saralee Thungthongkam of Thailand in the second. In the quarterfinals, Persson and Bergström lost to Zhang Jun and Gao Ling of China 15–3, 15–1. After retiring from the international tournament, in 2009, Persson runs a project Girls of Badminton, to encourage and promote females within the Swedish Badminton Association. In 2011, she was awarded as a Person of the Year by the Badminton Europe. Her sister, Sara Persson, also an Olympian who competed at the 2008 Summer Olympics in Beijing, China.

== Achievements ==
=== European Championships ===
Women's doubles
| Year | Venue | Partner | Opponent | Score | Result |
|---|---|---|---|---|---|
| 2008 | Messecenter; Herning, Denmark | (Sweden) Elin Bergblom | (England) Gail Emms (England) Donna Kellogg | 18–21, 7–21 | Bronze |
| 2006 | Maaspoort Sports and Events; Den Bosch, Netherlands | (Sweden) Elin Bergblom | (England) Gail Emms (England) Donna Kellogg | 9–21, 21–16, 15–21 | Bronze |

Mixed doubles
| Year | Venue | Partner | Opponent | Score | Result |
|---|---|---|---|---|---|
| 2004 | Queue d’Arve Sport Center; Geneva, Switzerland | (Sweden) Fredrik Bergström | (Denmark) Jonas Rasmussen (Denmark) Rikke Olsen | 3–15, 10–15 | Bronze |

=== IBF Grand Prix ===
The World Badminton Grand Prix sanctioned by International Badminton Federation since 1983.

Mixed doubles
| Year | Tournament | Partner | Opponent | Score | Result |
|---|---|---|---|---|---|
| 2005 | Bitburger Open | (Ukraine) Vladislav Druzchenko | (New Zealand) Daniel Shirley (New Zealand) Sara Runesten-Petersen | 15–11, 11–15, 15–6 | (gold) Winner |

=== BWF International Challenge/Series ===
Women's doubles
| Year | Tournament | Partner | Opponent | Score | Result |
|---|---|---|---|---|---|
| 2008 | Polish International | (Sweden) Elin Bergblom | (Indonesia) Shendy Puspa Irawati (Indonesia) Meiliana Jauhari | 11–21, 19–21 | (silver) Runner-up |
| 2007 | Le Volant d'Or de Toulouse | (Sweden) Elin Bergblom | (France) Elodie Eymard (France) Weny Rahmawati | 21–11, 21–15 | (gold) Winner |
| 2006 | Swedish International | (Sweden) Elin Bergblom | (Germany) Birgit Overzier (Germany) Carina Mette | 21–13, 21–15 | (gold) Winner |
| 2005 | Scottish International | (Sweden) Elin Bergblom | (Russia) Nina Vislova (Russia) Valeria Sorokina | 5–15, 10–15 | (silver) Runner-up |
| 2005 | Iceland International | (Sweden) Elin Bergblom | (Netherlands) Paulien van Dooremalen (Netherlands) Rachel van Cutsen | 17–14, 15–11 | (gold) Winner |
| 2005 | Dutch International | (Sweden) Elin Bergblom | (Germany) Nicole Grether (Germany) Juliane Schenk | 4–15, 9–15 | (silver) Runner-up |
| 2002 | Czech International | (Sweden) Elin Bergblom | (Belarus) Olga Konon (Belarus) Nadieżda Kostiuczyk | 11–5, 11–8 | (gold) Winner |
| 2002 | Spanish International | (Sweden) Elin Bergblom | (Portugal) Filipa Lamy (Portugal) Telma Santos | 8–6, 7–0, 7–4 | (gold) Winner |
| 2002 | Finnish International | (Sweden) Elin Bergblom | (Austria) Verena Fastenbauer (Austria) Karina Lengauer | Walkover | (gold) Winner |
| 2001 | Hungarian International | (Sweden) Elin Bergblom | (Hungary) Krisztina Ádám (Hungary) Csilla Fórián | 3–7, 7–2, 7–0 | (gold) Winner |
| 2000 | Norwegian International | (Sweden) Caroline Eriksson | (Finland) Anu Weckström (Finland) Nina Weckström | 15–10, 10–15, 7–15 | (silver) Runner-up |

Mixed doubles
| Year | Tournament | Partner | Opponent | Score | Result |
|---|---|---|---|---|---|
| 2005 | Iceland International | (Sweden) Henri Hurskainen | (Denmark) Jacob Chemnitz (Denmark) Julie Houmann | 15–5, 13–15, 15–11 | (gold) Winner |
| 2005 | Czech International | (Sweden) Henri Hurskainen | (Germany) Tim Dettmann (Germany) Annekatrin Lillie | 17–15, 15–7 | (gold) Winner |
| 2005 | Dutch International | (Sweden) Fredrik Bergström | (Germany) Ingo Kindervater (Germany) Kathrin Piotrowski | 15–4, 15–13 | (gold) Winner |
| 2004 | Scottish International | (Sweden) Fredrik Bergström | (Germany) Jochen Cassel (Germany) Birgit Overzier | 15–3, 15–13 | (gold) Winner |
| 2004 | Norwegian International | (Sweden) Fredrik Bergström | (England) Kristian Roebuck (England) Liza Parker | 16–17, 15–4, 15–10 | (gold) Winner |
| 2003 | Bitburger International | (Sweden) Fredrik Bergström | (Russia) Nikolay Zuev (Russia) Marina Yakusheva | 13–15, 15–10, 15–13 | (gold) Winner |
| 2003 | Austrian International | (Sweden) Fredrik Bergström | (England) Simon Archer (England) Donna Kellogg | 6–11, 11–5, 6–11 | (silver) Runner-up |
| 2003 | Portugal International | (Sweden) Fredrik Bergström | (Denmark) Carsten Mogensen (Denmark) Helle Nielsen | 10–13, 11–5, 11–7 | (gold) Winner |
| 2002 | Austrian International | (Netherlands) Dennis Lens | (Denmark) Kasper Kiim Jensen (Denmark) Helle Nielsen | 6–8, 8–7, 7–4, 8–6 | (gold) Winner |
| 2001 | Hungarian International | (Sweden) Daniel Glaser | (Slovenia) Andrej Pohar (Slovenia) Maja Pohar | 5–7, 1–7, 1–7 | (silver) Runner-up |
| 2000 | Welsh International | (Sweden) Henrik Andersson | (England) Anthony Clark (England) Gail Emms | 4–7, 1–7, 0–7 | (silver) Runner-up |
| 2000 | Norwegian International | (Sweden) Ola Molin | (Sweden) Jörgen Olsson (Sweden) Frida Andreasson | 17–15, 15–11 | (gold) Winner |
| 2000 | Austrian International | (Sweden) Ola Molin | (England) David Lindley (England) Liza Parker | 15–9, 12–15, 15–9 | (gold) Winner |
| 1999 | Welsh International | (Sweden) Ola Molin | (England) Peter Jeffrey (England) Joanne Davies | 15–11, 5–15, 13–15 | (silver) Runner-up |
| 1999 | Czech International | (Sweden) Ola Molin | (Germany) Christian Mohr (Germany) Anne Hönscheid | 15–7, 15–7 | (gold) Winner |
| 1997 | Czech International | (Sweden) Henrik Andersson | (England) Ian Sullivan (England) Gail Emms | 8–11, 4–9, 3–9 | (silver) Runner-up |

BWF International Challenge tournament
BWF International Series tournament
