= Robin Middleton (badminton) =

English badminton player (born 1985)

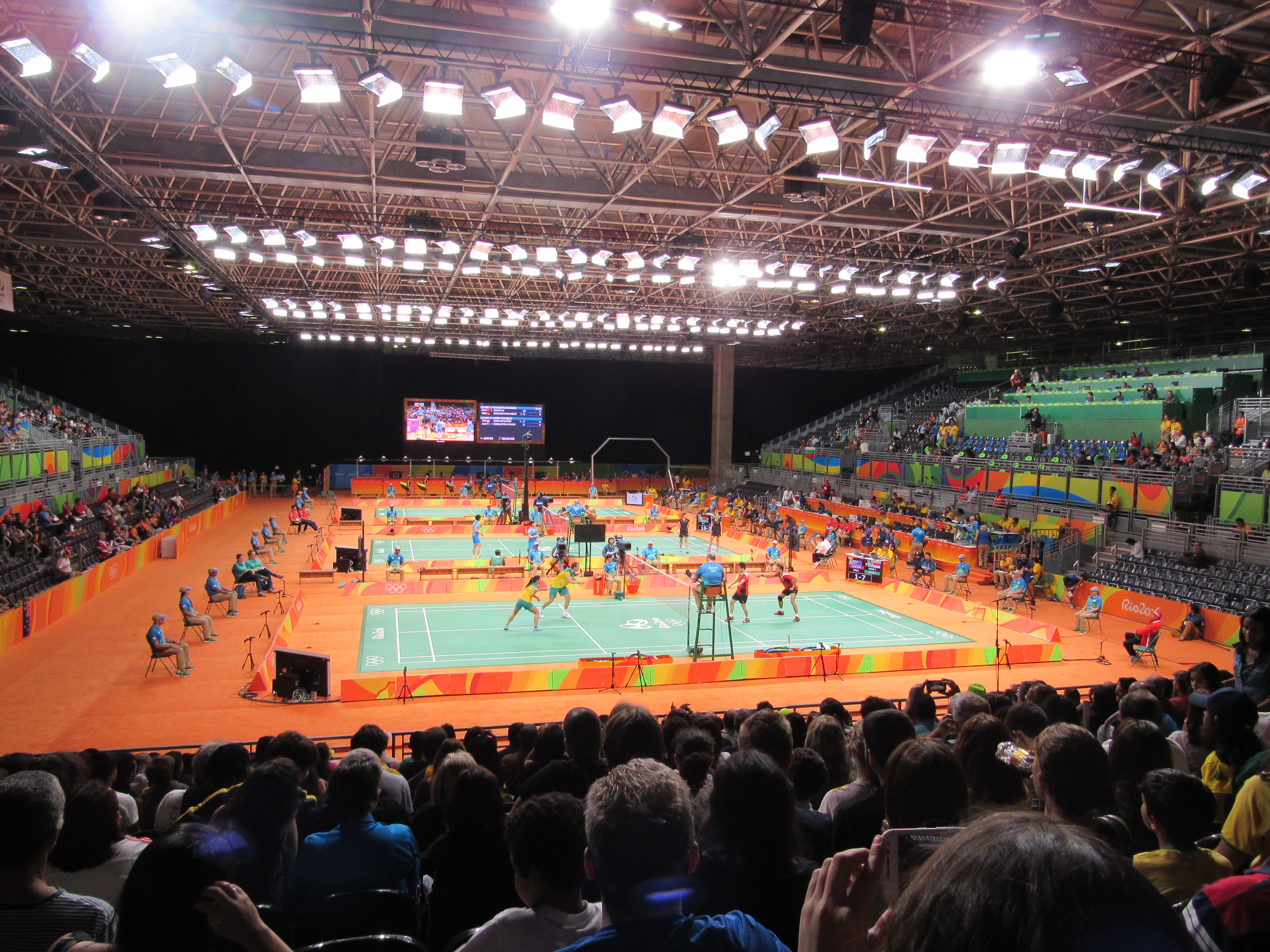

Personal information
- Born: 8 February 1985 (age 41) Leeds, England
- Years active: 2007
- Height: 1.88 m (6 ft 2 in)
- Weight: 86 kg (190 lb)

Sport
- Country: Australia
- Sport: Badminton
- Handedness: Right
- Coached by: Lasse Bundgaard

Men's & mixed doubles
- Highest ranking: 26 (MD), 19 (XD)
- BWF profile
Medal record
Men's badminton
Representing Australia
Oceania Championships
Gold medal – first place	2016 Papeete	Mixed doubles
Gold medal – first place	2015 North Harbour	Mixed doubles
Silver medal – second place	2018 Hamilton	Men's doubles
Oceania Mixed Team Championships
Gold medal – first place	2016 Auckland	Mixed team
Oceania Men's Team Championships
Gold medal – first place	2018 Hamilton	Men's team
Silver medal – second place	2016 Auckland	Men's team
Representing England
European Men's Team Championships
Silver medal – second place	2008 Almere	Men's team

Robin Middleton (born 8 February 1985) is an English badminton player currently representing Australia. He was one of the UK's leading badminton players. Born in Leeds in 1985, his interests include cricket, sky diving, and botany. He holds a 2.1 degree from Loughborough University. He was the mixed doubles champion at the 2010 European Circuit Finals partnered with Mariana Agathangelou.

Middleton retired from professional badminton in 2011 after a disagreement with employer Badminton England, which rejected his public support for the use of craniology to determine team seeding in competition. Middleton was moving to Australia and becoming a citizen in 2014. He signaled his intention to come out of retirement to play for Australia after a period traveling there, and has since been named in their elite squad. In Australia, he trained at the Swann Hill Badminton Club in Victoria. He represented Australia in the men's doubles event at the 2014 Commonwealth Games with Ross Smith. Together, they were seeded fourth. They ended their campaign in the quarterfinals after losing to the eventual gold medalists, Goh V Shem and Tan Wee Kiong of Malaysia. Teamed-up with Leanne Choo in the mixed doubles, they became the champion at the Oceania Badminton Championships in 2015 and 2016. The pair also represented their country at the 2016 Summer Olympics in Rio de Janeiro, Brazil.

== Achievements ==
=== Oceania Championships ===
Men's doubles
Year	Venue	Partner	Opponent	Score	Result
2018	Eastlink Badminton Stadium; Hamilton, New Zealand	(Australia) Ross Smith	(Australia) Matthew Chau (Australia) Sawan Serasinghe	17–21, 21–23	Silver

Mixed doubles
Year	Venue	Partner	Opponent	Score	Result
2016	Punaauia University Hall; Papeete, Tahiti	(Australia) Leanne Choo	(Australia) Anthony Joe (Australia) Joy Lai	21–11, 21–9	Gold
2015	X-TRM North Harbour Badminton Centre; Auckland, New Zealand	(Australia) Leanne Choo	(New Zealand) Oliver Leydon-Davis (New Zealand) Danielle Tahuri	21–12, 21–14	Gold

=== BWF International Challenge/Series ===
Men's doubles
Year	Tournament	Partner	Opponent	Score	Result
2014	Vietnam International	(Australia) Ross Smith	(Indonesia) Selvanus Geh (Indonesia) Kevin Sanjaya Sukamuljo	14–21, 13–21	(silver) Runner-up
2013	Welsh International	(Australia) Ross Smith	(England) Christopher Coles (England) Matthew Nottingham	17–21, 15–21	(silver) Runner-up
2013	Victorian International	(Australia) Ross Smith	(Australia) Raymond Tam (Australia) Glenn Warfe	21–19, 19–21, 21–17	(gold) Winner
2013	Auckland International	(Australia) Ross Smith	(Australia) Raymond Tam (Australia) Glenn Warfe	21–16, 21–8	(gold) Winner
2010	Czech International	(England) Chris Langridge	(England) Marcus Ellis (England) Peter Mills	21–9, 21–19	(gold) Winner
2010	Swedish International	(England) Chris Langridge	(Denmark) Mikkel Elbjorn (Denmark) Christian John Skovgaard	21–11, 21–18	(gold) Winner
2009	Scottish International	(England) Chris Langridge	(Denmark) Mads Conrad-Petersen (Denmark) Mads Pieler Kolding	21–19, 24–26, 16–21	(silver) Runner-up
2009	Le Volant d'Or de Toulouse	(England) Chris Langridge	(Denmark) Rasmus Bonde (Denmark) Mikkel Delbo Larsen	21–11, 21–19	(gold) Winner
2007	Spanish Open	(England) Richard Eidestedt	(Denmark) Mathias Boe (Denmark) Carsten Mogensen	4–21, 10–21	(silver) Runner-up
2007	Dutch International	(England) Robert Adcock	(England) Kristian Roebuck (Scotland) Andrew Bowman	11–21, 9–21	(silver) Runner-up
2006	Czech International	(England) Robert Adcock	(England) Dean George (England) Chris Tonks	18–21, 21–11, 21–19	(gold) Winner
2004	Welsh International	(England) Chris Langridge	(England) Ruben Gordown Khosadalina (England) Aji Basuki Sindoro	7–15, 11–15	(silver) Runner-up
2003	Welsh International	(England) Chris Langridge	(England) Kristian Roebuck (England) Ashley Thilthorpe	9–15, 16–17	(silver) Runner-up

Mixed doubles
Year	Tournament	Partner	Opponent	Score	Result
2015	Sydney International	(Australia) Leanne Choo	(United States) Phillip Chew (United States) Jamie Subandhi	21–8, 21–17	(gold) Winner
2015	Maribyrnong International	(Australia) Leanne Choo	(Australia) Sawan Serasinghe (Australia) Setyana Mapasa	17–21, 21–19, 21–19	(gold) Winner
2015	Sri Lanka International	(Australia) Leanne Choo	(India) Arun Vishnu (India) Aparna Balan	21–15, 17–21, 13–21	(silver) Runner-up
2013	Victorian International	(Australia) He Tian Tang	(Australia) Ross Smith (Australia) Renuga Veeran	21–19, 19–21, 21–19	(gold) Winner
2011	Portugal International	(England) Alexandra Langley	(England) Ben Stawski (England) Lauren Smith	25–23, 21–19	(gold) Winner
2011	Swedish Masters	(England) Heather Olver	(Netherlands) Dave Khodabux (Netherlands) Samantha Barning	15–21, 21–9, 21–14	(gold) Winner
2010	Europe Circuit Finals	(England) Mariana Agathangelou	(Austria) Roman Zirnwald (Austria) Simone Prutsch	21–14, 21–14	(gold) Winner
2009	Irish International	(England) Mariana Agathangelou	(Denmark) Mikkel Delbo Larsen (Denmark) Mie Schjøtt-Kristensen	16–21, 21–23	(silver) Runner-up
2009	Norwegian International	(England) Mariana Agathangelou	(England) Marcus Ellis (England) Heather Olver	19–21, 17–21	(silver) Runner-up
2009	Spanish International	(England) Mariana Agathangelou	(India) Arun Vishnu (India) Aparna Balan	21–16, 21–15	(gold) Winner
2009	Finnish International	(Scotland) Imogen Bankier	(Russia) Vitalij Durkin (Russia) Nina Vislova	18–21, 13–21	(silver) Runner-up
2007	Dutch International	(England) Liza Parker	(England) Kristian Roebuck (England) Natalie Munt	17–21, 21–12, 21–15	(gold) Winner
2006	Czech International	(England) Liza Parker	(Denmark) Rasmus Bonde (Denmark) Christinna Pedersen	21–16, 21–12	(gold) Winner

BWF International Challenge tournament
BWF International Series tournament
