= Elin Bergblom =

Swedish badminton player (born 1982)

Personal information
- Born: 18 January 1982 (age 44) Knivsta, Sweden
- Height: 1.70 m (5 ft 7 in)

Sport
- Country: Sweden
- Sport: Badminton
- Handedness: Right

Women's doubles
- Highest ranking: 89 (4 February 2010)
- BWF profile
Medal record
Women's badminton
Representing Sweden
European Championships
Bronze medal – third place	2008 Herning	Women's doubles
Bronze medal – third place	2006 Den Bosch	Women's doubles

Elin Bergblom (born 18 January 1982) is a Swedish badminton player. Bergblom started her junior career in Täby Badmintonförening, and won her first national junior title in 1995 in the girls' and mixed doubles event. she represented her country competed at the 1999 European Youth Summer Olympic in Esbjerg, Denmark. Bergblom won the Swedish National senior title 9 times from 2002 to 2012, 5 in women's doubles, 3 in mixed doubles and once in women's singles event. Throughout her career, she ever been played for the Uppsala KFUM. She won the bronze medals at the 2006 and 2008 European Championship in the women's doubles event partnered with Johanna Persson.

== Achievements ==
=== European Championships ===
Women's doubles
Year	Venue	Partner	Opponent	Score	Result
2008	Messecenter; Herning, Denmark	(Sweden) Johanna Persson	(England) Gail Emms (England) Donna Kellogg	18–21, 7–21	Bronze
2006	Maaspoort Sports and Events; Den Bosch, Netherlands	(Sweden) Johanna Persson	(England) Gail Emms (England) Donna Kellogg	9–21, 21–16, 15–21	Bronze

=== BWF International Challenge/Series ===
Women's doubles
Year	Tournament	Partner	Opponent	Score	Result
2008	Polish International	(Sweden) Johanna Persson	(Indonesia) Shendy Puspa Irawati (Indonesia) Meiliana Jauhari	11–21, 19–21	(silver) Runner-up
2007	Le Volant d'Or de Toulouse	(Sweden) Johanna Persson	(France) Elodie Eymard (France) Weny Rahmawati	21–11, 21–15	(gold) Winner
2006	Swedish International	(Sweden) Johanna Persson	(Germany) Birgit Overzier (Germany) Carina Mette	21–13, 21–15	(gold) Winner
2005	Scottish International	(Sweden) Johanna Persson	(Russia) Nina Vislova (Russia) Valeria Sorokina	5–15, 10–15	(silver) Runner-up
2005	Iceland International	(Sweden) Johanna Persson	(Netherlands) Paulien van Dooremalen (Netherlands) Rachel van Cutsen	17–14, 15–11	(gold) Winner
2005	Dutch International	(Sweden) Johanna Persson	(Germany) Nicole Grether (Germany) Juliane Schenk	4–15, 9–15	(silver) Runner-up
2002	Czech International	(Sweden) Johanna Persson	(Belarus) Olga Konon (Belarus) Nadieżda Kostiuczyk	11–5, 11–8	(gold) Winner
2002	Spanish International	(Sweden) Johanna Persson	(Portugal) Filipa Lamy (Portugal) Telma Santos	8–6, 7–0, 7–4	(gold) Winner
2002	Finnish International	(Sweden) Johanna Persson	(Austria) Verena Fastenbauer (Austria) Karina Lengauer	Walkover	(gold) Winner
2001	Hungarian International	(Sweden) Johanna Persson	(Hungary) Krisztina Ádám (Hungary) Csilla Fórián	3–7, 7–2, 7–0	(gold) Winner

Mixed doubles
Year	Tournament	Partner	Opponent	Score	Result
2006	Norwegian International	(Indonesia) Imam Sodikin	(Canada) Brian Prevoe (China) Yu Qi	21–18, 21–14	(gold) Winner

BWF International Challenge tournament
BWF International Series tournament
