= Suzanne Rayappan =

English badminton player (born 1981)

Personal information
- Born: 18 May 1981 (age 45) Hitchin, Herts
- Height: 1.60 m (5 ft 3 in)

Sport
- Country: England
- Sport: Badminton
- Handedness: Left

Mixed doubles
- Highest ranking: 11
- BWF profile
Medal record
Women's badminton
Representing England
Sudirman Cup
Bronze medal – third place	2007 Glasgow	Mixed team
European Women's Team Championships
Silver medal – second place	2006 Thessalonica	Women's team
European Junior Championships
Bronze medal – third place	1999 Glasgow	Girls' doubles

Suzanne Rayappan (born 18 May 1981) is a professional badminton player and a member of the English badminton team. She specializes in mixed doubles.
