= List of badminton players with the most Superseries, Grand Prix, and World Tour titles =

List of badminton title winners since 2007

This page lists all badminton players who have won titles in the BWF Super Series, BWF Grand Prix Gold and Grand Prix, and BWF World Tour. The Super Series and Grand Prix structure operated from 2007 to 2017, with the final Super Series tournament held at the 2017 Hong Kong Open. The World Tour was introduced in 2018 as BWF's new international tournament circuit. The statistics are independently compiled from the annual winners lists and BWF tournament results rather than from an official BWF all-time table. Lee Chong Wei holds the Super Series record with 46 titles. In 2025, An Se-young and Seo Seung-jae each won 11 BWF World Tour titles, the highest single-season total since the circuit was introduced in 2018.

== Timeline ==
The tournament classifications in the timeline follow the categories recorded in BWF's annual calendars. The 2017 calendar lists the former World Superseries, Grand Prix Gold, and Grand Prix categories, while the 2018 calendar records the first season of the World Tour classifications.

● Super Series Finals
● Super Series Premier
● Super Series
● Grand Prix Gold
● Grand Prix
● World Tour Finals
● Super 1000
● Super 750
● Super 500
● Super 300
● Super 100

Tournament	Super Series / Grand Prix											World Tour														Editions
Tournament	2007	2008	2009	2010	2011	2012	2013	2014	2015	2016	2017	2018	2019	2020		2021	2022	2023		2024		2025		2026		Editions
(Australia) Australian Open			•	•	•	•	•	•	•	•	•	•	•	•		•	•	•		•		•		•		16
(Brazil) Brasil Open								•	•	•																3
(Bulgaria) Bulgarian Open		•																								1
Canada Open				•	•	•	•	•	•	•	•	•	•	•		•	•	•		•		•		•		15
China Open	•	•	•	•	•	•	•	•	•	•	•	•	•	•		•	•	•		•		•		•		17
China Masters	•	•	•	•	•	•	•	•	•	•	•	•	•	•		•	•	•		•		•		•		17
Ruichang China Masters												•	•	•		•		•		•		•		•		6
(Chinese Taipei) Taipei Open	•	•	•	•	•	•	•	•	•	•	•	•	•	•		•	•	•		•		•		•		18
Chinese Taipei Masters									•	•																2
(Chinese Taipei) Kaohsiung Masters																		•		•		•		•		4
Denmark Open	•	•	•	•	•	•	•	•	•	•	•	•	•	•		•	•	•		•		•		•		20
All England Open	•	•	•	•	•	•	•	•	•	•	•	•	•	•		•	•	•		•		•		•		20
(England) London Grand Prix Gold							•																			1
(Finland) Arctic Open																		•		•		•		•		4
(France) French Open	•	•	•	•	•	•	•	•	•	•	•	•	•	•		•	•	•		•		•		•		19
(France) Orléans Masters												•	•	•		•	•	•		•		•		•		8
(Germany) German Open	•	•	•	•	•	•	•	•	•	•	•	•	•	•		•	•	•		•		•		•		18
(Germany) Hylo Open	•	•	•	•	•	•	•	•	•	•	•	•	•	•		•	•	•		•		•		•		20
Hong Kong Open	•	•	•	•	•	•	•	•	•	•	•	•	•	•		•	•	•		•		•		•		17
India Open	•	•	•	•	•	•	•	•	•	•	•	•	•	•		•	•	•		•		•		•		17
(India) Syed Modi International			•	•	•	•		•	•	•	•	•	•	•		•	•	•		•		•		•		15
(India) Guwahati Masters																		•		•		•		•		4
(India) Hyderabad Open												•	•	•		•										2
(India) Odisha Masters																	•	•		•		•		•		5
Indonesia Open	•	•	•	•	•	•	•	•	•	•	•	•	•	•		•	•	•		•		•		•		19
Indonesia Masters				•	•	•	•	•	•	•		•	•	•		•	•	•		•		•		•		16
Indonesia Masters Super 100												•	•	•		•	•	•	•	•	•	•	•	•	•	11
Japan Open	•	•	•	•	•	•	•	•	•	•	•	•	•	•		•	•	•		•		•		•		18
Japan Masters																		•		•		•		•		4
(Japan) Akita Masters												•	•	•		•	•									2
Macau Open	•	•	•	•	•	•	•	•	•	•	•	•	•	•		•	•			•		•		•		16
Malaysia Open	•	•	•	•	•	•	•	•	•	•	•	•	•	•		•	•	•		•		•		•		18
Malaysia Masters			•	•	•	•	•	•	•	•	•	•	•	•		•	•	•		•		•		•		17
Malaysia Super 100																		•		•		•		•		4
Mexico City Grand Prix									•																	1
(Netherlands) Dutch Open	•	•	•	•	•	•	•	•	•	•	•	•	•	•												13
New Zealand Open	•	•	•				•	•	•	•	•	•	•	•		•	•									10
Philippines Open	•		•																							2
(Russia) Russian Open	•	•	•	•	•	•	•	•	•	•	•	•	•	•		•	•									13
(Scotland) Scottish Open							•	•	•	•	•	•														6
Singapore Open	•	•	•	•	•	•	•	•	•	•	•	•	•	•		•	•	•		•		•		•		18
(South Korea) Korea Open	•	•	•	•	•	•	•	•	•	•	•	•	•	•		•	•	•		•		•		•		18
(South Korea) Korea Masters				•	•	•	•	•	•	•	•	•	•	•		•	•	•		•		•		•		15
Spain Masters												•	•	•		•	•	•		•		•		•		8
(Switzerland) Swiss Open	•	•	•	•	•	•	•	•	•	•	•	•	•	•		•	•	•		•		•		•		19
Thailand Open	•	•	•	•	•	•	•	•	•	•	•	•	•	•	•	•	•	•		•		•		•		18
Thailand Masters										•	•	•	•	•		•		•		•		•		•		9
(United Arab Emirates) Abu Dhabi Masters																		•		•		•		•		4
(United States) U.S. Open	•	•	•	•	•	•	•	•	•	•	•	•	•	•		•	•	•		•		•		•		17
(United States) U.S. International								•	•																	2
Vietnam Open	•	•	•	•	•	•	•	•	•	•	•	•	•	•		•	•	•		•		•		•		18
Year-End Finals	•	•	•	•	•	•	•	•	•	•	•	•	•	•		•	•	•		•		•		•		19
Super Series / Super 500 or above	12	13	13	13	13	13	13	13	13	13	13	16	16	7		7	13	20		20		20		20		281
Grand Prix / Super 300 and 100	11	12	15	15	16	16	18	19	22	21	18	22	21	3		3	12	19		20		20		20		323
Total	23	25	28	28	29	29	31	32	35	34	31	38	37	10		10	25	39		40		40		40		604
Tournament	2007	2008	2009	2010	2011	2012	2013	2014	2015	2016	2017	2018	2019	2020		2021	2022	2023		2024		2025		2026		Editions
Tournament	Super Series / Grand Prix											World Tour														Editions

== Most titles overall ==
As of the 2026 Hong Kong Open

The table lists players who have won at least 30 titles across the BWF Super Series, BWF Grand Prix Gold and Grand Prix, and BWF World Tour circuits. The totals are calculated from the tournament results in the annual BWF calendars and the yearly winners lists. In doubles events, each title is credited individually to both members of the winning pair.

Rank	Player	Event	Super Series	Grand Prix	World Tour	Total
1	(South Korea) Lee Yong-dae	MD/XD	43	13	3	59
2	(Malaysia) Lee Chong Wei	MS	46	10	1	57
3	(China) Huang Yaqiong	XD/WD	9	10	33	52
4	(China) Zheng Siwei	XD/MD	8	10	33	51
5	(China) Yu Yang	WD/XD	42	8	0	50
6	(China) Zhao Yunlei	XD/WD	42	7	0	49
7	(China) Chen Qingchen	WD/XD	12	13	19	44
8	(South Korea) An Se-young	WS	0	0	42	42
9	(China) Huang Dongping	XD/WD	1	5	34	40
9	(China) Zhang Nan	XD/MD	31	7	2	40
11	(South Korea) Ko Sung-hyun	MD/XD	11	18	7	36
12	(China) Jia Yifan	WD	5	6	24	35
13	(South Korea) Seo Seung-jae	MD/XD	0	4	30	34
14	(China) Lin Dan	MS	21	10	2	33
14	(Indonesia) Kevin Sanjaya Sukamuljo	MD	10	4	19	33
16	(Chinese Taipei) Tai Tzu-ying	WS	12	3	17	32
16	(Denmark) Viktor Axelsen	MS	4	1	27	32
16	(Indonesia) Marcus Fernaldi Gideon	MD	11	2	19	32
19	(Japan) Akane Yamaguchi	WS	5	2	24	31
20	(China) Wang Xiaoli	WD/XD	27	3	0	30
20	(Denmark) Christinna Pedersen	XD/WD	18	9	3	30
20	(South Korea) Yoo Yeon-seong	MD/XD	19	11	0	30

=== Record holders by event ===
Event	Player	Super Series	Grand Prix	World Tour	Total
Men's singles	(Malaysia) Lee Chong Wei	46	10	1	57
Women's singles	(South Korea) An Se-young	0	0	42	42
Men's doubles	(South Korea) Lee Yong-dae	37	11	3	51
Women's doubles	(China) Yu Yang	36	5	0	41
Mixed doubles	(China) Zheng Siwei	8	8	33	49

== Most BWF Super Series titles ==
The overall table lists players who won at least 15 BWF Super Series titles, while the discipline tables list players with at least ten titles. The totals include the Super Series Finals, Super Series Premier, and regular Super Series tournaments held between 2007 and 2017. In doubles events, each title is credited individually to both members of the winning pair.

=== Overall ===
Rank	Player	Event	Finals	Premier	Super Series	Total
1	(Malaysia) Lee Chong Wei	MS	4	12	30	46
2	(South Korea) Lee Yong-dae	MD/XD	2	11	30	43
3	(China) Yu Yang	WD/XD	3	15	24	42
3	(China) Zhao Yunlei	XD/WD	3	13	26	42
5	(China) Zhang Nan	XD/MD	3	12	16	31
6	(China) Wang Xiaoli	WD/XD	3	13	11	27
7	(China) Ma Jin	XD/WD	0	9	13	22
8	(China) Lin Dan	MS	1	5	15	21
8	(Indonesia) Liliyana Natsir	XD/WD	0	7	14	21
10	(China) Chen Long	MS	2	10	8	20
10	(China) Wang Yihan	WS	1	4	15	20
12	(South Korea) Yoo Yeon-seong	MD	1	7	11	19
13	(Denmark) Christinna Pedersen	XD/WD	4	3	11	18
13	(Indonesia) Hendra Setiawan	MD	2	3	13	18
13	(South Korea) Jung Jae-sung	MD	1	4	13	18
16	(China) Fu Haifeng	MD	0	3	13	16
16	(China) Tian Qing	WD/XD	0	4	12	16
16	(Denmark) Mathias Boe	MD	3	4	9	16
16	(Denmark) Carsten Mogensen	MD	3	4	9	16
16	(Indonesia) Tontowi Ahmad	XD	0	7	9	16
21	(China) Cai Yun	MD	0	2	13	15

=== Men's singles ===
Rank	Player	Titles
1	(Malaysia) Lee Chong Wei	46
2	(China) Lin Dan	21
3	(China) Chen Long	20

=== Women's singles ===
Rank	Player	Titles
1	(China) Wang Yihan	20
2	(China) Li Xuerui	14
3	(China) Wang Shixian	12
3	(Chinese Taipei) Tai Tzu-ying	12
5	(India) Saina Nehwal	10

=== Men's doubles ===
Rank	Player	Titles
1	(South Korea) Lee Yong-dae	37
2	(South Korea) Yoo Yeon-seong	19
3	(Indonesia) Hendra Setiawan	18
3	(South Korea) Jung Jae-sung	18
5	(China) Fu Haifeng	16
5	(Denmark) Mathias Boe	16
5	(Denmark) Carsten Mogensen	16
8	(China) Cai Yun	15
9	(Indonesia) Marcus Fernaldi Gideon	11
10	(Indonesia) Markis Kido	10
10	(Indonesia) Kevin Sanjaya Sukamuljo	10

=== Women's doubles ===
Rank	Player	Titles
1	(China) Yu Yang	36
2	(China) Wang Xiaoli	26
3	(China) Zhao Yunlei	15
4	(China) Tian Qing	14
5	(China) Bao Yixin	13
6	(China) Tang Jinhua	12

=== Mixed doubles ===
Rank	Player	Titles
1	(China) Zhang Nan	27
1	(China) Zhao Yunlei	27
3	(Indonesia) Liliyana Natsir	20
4	(Indonesia) Tontowi Ahmad	16
5	(China) Ma Jin	15
6	(Denmark) Joachim Fischer Nielsen	13
6	(Denmark) Christinna Pedersen	13
8	(China) Xu Chen	11
8	(China) Zheng Bo	11

== Most BWF Grand Prix titles ==
The overall table lists players who won at least ten BWF Grand Prix Gold and Grand Prix titles, while the discipline tables list players with at least seven titles. The totals include Grand Prix Gold and Grand Prix tournaments held between 2007 and 2017. In doubles events, each title is credited individually to both members of the winning pair.

=== Overall ===
Rank	Player	Event	Grand Prix Gold	Grand Prix	Total
1	(South Korea) Ko Sung-hyun	MD/XD	10	8	18
2	(China) Chen Qingchen	XD/WD	10	3	13
2	(Russia) Valeria Sorokina	WD/XD	0	13	13
2	(South Korea) Lee Yong-dae	MD/XD	3	10	13
5	(Indonesia) Vita Marissa	XD/WD	8	4	12
6	(Russia) Nina Vislova	WD/XD	0	11	11
6	(South Korea) Kim Ha-na	XD/WD	10	1	11
6	(South Korea) Lee Hyun-il	MS	5	6	11
6	(South Korea) Yoo Yeon-seong	MD/XD	4	7	11
10	(China) Huang Yaqiong	XD/WD	9	1	10
10	(China) Lin Dan	MS	6	4	10
10	(China) Tang Jinhua	WD/XD	7	3	10
10	(China) Zheng Siwei	XD/MD	6	4	10
10	(Chinese Taipei) Chien Yu-chin	WD/XD	2	8	10
10	(Indonesia) Tontowi Ahmad	XD	5	5	10
10	(Malaysia) Lee Chong Wei	MS	5	5	10
10	(Russia) Vladimir Ivanov	MD/MS	1	9	10
10	(South Korea) Sung Ji-hyun	WS	8	2	10

=== Men's singles ===
Rank	Player	Titles
1	(South Korea) Lee Hyun-il	11
2	(China) Lin Dan	10
2	(Malaysia) Lee Chong Wei	10
4	(Chinese Taipei) Chou Tien-chen	7
4	(Vietnam) Nguyễn Tiến Minh	7

=== Women's singles ===
Rank	Player	Titles
1	(South Korea) Sung Ji-hyun	10
2	(India) Saina Nehwal	9
3	(China) Wang Yihan	7

=== Men's doubles ===
Rank	Player	Titles
1	(South Korea) Ko Sung-hyun	13
2	(South Korea) Lee Yong-dae	11
3	(Denmark) Mathias Boe	9
3	(Denmark) Carsten Mogensen	9
5	(Malaysia) Koo Kien Keat	8
5	(Malaysia) Tan Boon Heong	8
7	(Russia) Vladimir Ivanov	7
7	(Russia) Ivan Sozonov	7
7	(South Korea) Yoo Yeon-seong	7

=== Women's doubles ===
Rank	Player	Titles
1	(South Korea) Jung Kyung-eun	9
2	(China) Tang Jinhua	8
2	(Chinese Taipei) Chien Yu-chin	8
2	(Russia) Nina Vislova	8
5	(China) Bao Yixin	7
5	(Chinese Taipei) Cheng Wen-hsing	7
5	(Russia) Valeria Sorokina	7
5	(South Korea) Shin Seung-chan	7

=== Mixed doubles ===
Rank	Player	Titles
1	(Indonesia) Tontowi Ahmad	10
2	(Indonesia) Vita Marissa	9
3	(China) Zheng Siwei	8
4	(China) Chen Qingchen	7
4	(Indonesia) Liliyana Natsir	7
4	(South Korea) Kim Ha-na	7

== Most BWF World Tour titles ==
As of the 2026 Hong Kong Open

The following table lists players who have won at least 15 titles since the introduction of the BWF World Tour in 2018. The totals include the World Tour Finals, Super 1000, Super 750, Super 500, Super 300, and BWF Tour Super 100 tournaments, as recorded in BWF's tournament calendar. In doubles events, a title is credited individually to each member of the winning pair.

=== Overall ===
Rank	Player	Event	Finals	S1000	S750	S500	S300	S100	Total
1	(South Korea) An Se-young	WS	2	9	18	7	4	2	42
2	(China) Huang Dongping	XD/WD	2	4	11	13	4	0	34
3	(China) Huang Yaqiong	XD	4	9	11	9	0	0	33
3	(China) Zheng Siwei	XD	4	9	11	9	0	0	33
5	(South Korea) Seo Seung-jae	MD/XD	2	6	5	8	8	1	30
6	(China) Feng Yanzhe	XD	1	3	9	11	3	0	27
6	(Denmark) Viktor Axelsen	MS	3	10	4	6	4	0	27
8	(Thailand) Dechapol Puavaranukroh	XD/MD	2	4	6	7	6	0	25
9	(China) Jia Yifan	WD	3	4	8	6	3	0	24
9	(Japan) Akane Yamaguchi	WS	1	5	5	9	4	0	24
11	(China) Chen Yufei	WS	1	3	6	6	4	0	20
12	(China) Chen Qingchen	WD	3	4	6	4	2	0	19
12	(China) Liu Shengshu	WD	0	6	5	6	2	0	19
12	(China) Wei Yaxin	XD	0	1	5	8	3	2	19
12	(Indonesia) Marcus Fernaldi Gideon	MD	0	5	7	7	0	0	19
12	(Indonesia) Kevin Sanjaya Sukamuljo	MD	0	5	7	7	0	0	19
17	(China) Tan Ning	WD	0	6	5	5	2	0	18
17	(Japan) Yuta Watanabe	XD/MD	0	7	3	4	3	1	18
19	(Chinese Taipei) Tai Tzu-ying	WS	2	4	5	3	3	0	17
19	(South Korea) Kong Hee-yong	WD	1	2	4	5	5	0	17
19	(Thailand) Sapsiree Taerattanachai	XD/WD	2	3	3	5	4	0	17
22	(China) Jiang Zhenbang	XD	0	1	5	6	2	2	16
22	(Indonesia) Fajar Alfian	MD	0	5	3	5	3	0	16
22	(Japan) Kento Momota	MS	1	3	7	3	2	0	16
25	(China) Shi Yuqi	MS	2	5	5	1	2	0	15
25	(Japan) Yuki Fukushima	WD	0	5	6	2	2	0	15
25	(South Korea) Kim Won-ho	MD/XD	1	5	3	4	2	0	15

=== Men's singles ===
Rank	Player	Titles
1	(Denmark) Viktor Axelsen	27
2	(Japan) Kento Momota	16
3	(China) Shi Yuqi	15
4	(Denmark) Anders Antonsen	13
5	(Chinese Taipei) Chou Tien-chen	12
6	(Indonesia) Jonatan Christie	10

=== Women's singles ===
Rank	Player	Titles
1	(South Korea) An Se-young	42
2	(Japan) Akane Yamaguchi	24
3	(China) Chen Yufei	20
4	(Chinese Taipei) Tai Tzu-ying	17
5	(China) Wang Zhiyi	13
6	(Japan) Nozomi Okuhara	11
7	(Spain) Carolina Marín	10

=== Men's doubles ===
Rank	Player	Titles
1	(South Korea) Seo Seung-jae	24
2	(Indonesia) Marcus Fernaldi Gideon	19
2	(Indonesia) Kevin Sanjaya Sukamuljo	19
4	(Indonesia) Fajar Alfian	16
5	(South Korea) Kim Won-ho	14
6	(Indonesia) Muhammad Rian Ardianto	13
7	(Chinese Taipei) Wang Chi-lin	12
8	(China) Wang Chang	11
8	(India) Satwiksairaj Rankireddy	11
8	(India) Chirag Shetty	11
11	(China) Liang Weikeng	10
11	(Denmark) Kim Astrup	10
11	(Denmark) Anders Skaarup Rasmussen	10
11	(Malaysia) Goh Sze Fei	10
11	(Malaysia) Nur Izzuddin	10

=== Women's doubles ===
Rank	Player	Titles
1	(China) Jia Yifan	24
2	(China) Chen Qingchen	19
2	(China) Liu Shengshu	19
4	(China) Tan Ning	18
5	(South Korea) Kong Hee-yong	17
6	(Japan) Yuki Fukushima	15
7	(Japan) Nami Matsuyama	12
7	(Japan) Ayako Sakuramoto	12
7	(Japan) Chiharu Shida	12
7	(South Korea) Baek Ha-na	12
7	(South Korea) Lee So-hee	12
12	(Japan) Sayaka Hirota	11
12	(South Korea) Kim So-yeong	11
14	(Bulgaria) Gabriela Stoeva	10
14	(Bulgaria) Stefani Stoeva	10
14	(China) Zhang Shuxian	10
14	(Indonesia) Apriyani Rahayu	10
14	(South Korea) Kim Hye-jeong	10

=== Mixed doubles ===
Rank	Player	Titles
1	(China) Huang Dongping	33
1	(China) Huang Yaqiong	33
1	(China) Zheng Siwei	33
4	(China) Feng Yanzhe	27
5	(Thailand) Dechapol Puavaranukroh	24
6	(China) Wei Yaxin	19
7	(China) Jiang Zhenbang	16
8	(Thailand) Sapsiree Taerattanachai	16
9	(Japan) Yuta Watanabe	14
10	(Denmark) Alexandra Bøje	11
10	(Denmark) Mathias Christiansen	11
10	(Japan) Arisa Higashino	11
13	(China) Guo Xinwa	10

== Winners by year ==
- Super Series
  - 2007 BWF Super Series#Winners
  - 2008 BWF Super Series#Winners
  - 2009 BWF Super Series#Winners
  - 2010 BWF Super Series#Winners
  - 2011 BWF Super Series#Winners
  - 2012 BWF Super Series#Winners
  - 2013 BWF Super Series#Winners
  - 2014 BWF Super Series#Winners
  - 2015 BWF Super Series#Winners
  - 2016 BWF Super Series#Winners
  - 2017 BWF Super Series#Winners
- Grand Prix
  - 2007 BWF Grand Prix Gold and Grand Prix#Winners
  - 2008 BWF Grand Prix Gold and Grand Prix#Winners
  - 2009 BWF Grand Prix Gold and Grand Prix#Winners
  - 2010 BWF Grand Prix Gold and Grand Prix#Winners
  - 2011 BWF Grand Prix Gold and Grand Prix#Winners
  - 2012 BWF Grand Prix Gold and Grand Prix#Winners
  - 2013 BWF Grand Prix Gold and Grand Prix#Winners
  - 2014 BWF Grand Prix Gold and Grand Prix#Winners
  - 2015 BWF Grand Prix Gold and Grand Prix#Winners
  - 2016 BWF Grand Prix Gold and Grand Prix#Winners
  - 2017 BWF Grand Prix Gold and Grand Prix#Winners
- World Tour
  - 2018 BWF World Tour#Winners
  - 2019 BWF World Tour#Winners
  - 2020 BWF World Tour#Winners
  - 2021 BWF World Tour#Winners
  - 2022 BWF World Tour#Winners
  - 2023 BWF World Tour#Winners
  - 2024 BWF World Tour#Winners
  - 2025 BWF World Tour#Winners
  - 2026 BWF World Tour#Winners
