= 2014 BWF Grand Prix Gold and Grand Prix =

The 2014 BWF Grand Prix Gold and Grand Prix was the eighth season of the BWF Grand Prix Gold and Grand Prix.

== Schedule ==
Below is the schedule released by Badminton World Federation:

Tour	Official title	Venue	City	Date		Prize money USD	Report
Tour	Official title	Venue	City	Start	Finish	Prize money USD	Report
1	India Open Grand Prix Gold	Babu Banarasi Das Indoor Stadium	Lucknow	January 21	January 26	120,000	Report
2	(Germany) German Open Grand Prix Gold	RWE-Sporthalle	Mülheim	February 25	March 2	120,000	Report
3	(Switzerland) Swiss Open Grand Prix Gold	St. Jakobshalle	Basel	March 11	March 16	125,000	Report
4	Malaysia Grand Prix Gold	Stadium Perbandaran Pasir Gudang	Pasir Gudang	March 25	March 30	120,000	Report
5	New Zealand Open Grand Prix	North Shore Events Centre	Auckland	April 15	April 19	50,000	Report
6	China Masters Grand Prix Gold	Olympic Sports Center Xincheng Gymnasium	Jiangsu	April 15	April 20	250,000	Report
7	Canada Open Grand Prix	Doug Mitchell Thunderbird Sports Centre	Vancouver	June 30	July 5	50,000	Report
8	(United States) U.S. Open Grand Prix Gold	Suffolk County Community College	New York	July 8	July 13	120,000	Report
9	Chinese Taipei Open Grand Prix Gold	Taipei Arena	Taipei	July 15	July 20	200,000	Report
10	Russia Open Grand Prix	Sport Hall Olympic	Vladivostok	July 22	July 27	50,000	Report
11	Brazil Open Grand Prix	Comissão de Desporto da Aeronáutica	Rio de Janeiro	August 5	August 10	50,000	Report
12	Vietnam Open Grand Prix	Tan Binh Sports Center	Ho Chi Minh City	September 1	September 7	50,000	Report
13	(Indonesia) Indonesian Masters Grand Prix Gold	Jakabaring Sport City	Palembang	September 9	September 14	125,000	Report
14	(Netherlands) Dutch Open Grand Prix	Topsportcentrum	Almere	October 7	October 12	50,000	Report
15	(Germany) Bitburger Open Grand Prix Gold	Saarlandhalle	Saarbrücken	October 28	November 2	120,000	Report
16	(South Korea) Korea Grand Prix	Jeonju Indoor Badminton Court	Jeonju	November 4	November 9	50,000	Report
17	(Scotland) Scottish Open Grand Prix	Commonwealth Arena and Sir Chris Hoy Velodrome	Glasgow	November 19	November 23	50,000	Report
18	Macau Open Grand Prix Gold	Tap Seac Multi-sports Pavilion	Macau	November 25	November 30	120,000	Report
19	(United States) U.S. Open Grand Prix	Orange County Badminton Club	Orange	December 8	December 13	50,000	Report

Grand Prix Gold

== Results ==
=== Winners ===
Tour	Men's singles	Women's singles	Men's doubles	Women's doubles	Mixed doubles
India	(China) Xue Song	(India) Saina Nehwal	(China) Li Junhui (China) Liu Yuchen	(China) Chen Qingchen (China) Jia Yifan	(China) Wang Yilyu (China) Huang Yaqiong
Germany	(India) Arvind Bhat	(Japan) Sayaka Takahashi	(Japan) Takeshi Kamura (Japan) Keigo Sonoda	(Japan) Misaki Matsutomo (Japan) Ayaka Takahashi	(Scotland) Robert Blair (Scotland) Imogen Bankier
Swiss	(Denmark) Viktor Axelsen	(China) Wang Yihan	(China) Chai Biao (China) Hong Wei	(China) Bao Yixin (China) Tang Jinhua	(England) Chris Adcock (England) Gabby Adcock
Malaysia	(Indonesia) Simon Santoso	(China) Yao Xue	(Singapore) Danny Bawa Chrisnanta (Singapore) Chayut Triyachart	(China) Huang Yaqiong (China) Yu Xiaohan	(China) Lu Kai (China) Huang Yaqiong
New Zealand	(Chinese Taipei) Wang Tzu-wei	(Japan) Nozomi Okuhara	(Indonesia) Selvanus Geh (Indonesia) Kevin Sanjaya Sukamuljo	(Australia) Tang Hetian (Australia) Renuga Veeran	(Indonesia) Alfian Eko Prasetya (Indonesia) Annisa Saufika
China	(China) Lin Dan	(China) Liu Xin	(China) Kang Jun (China) Liu Cheng	(China) Luo Ying (China) Luo Yu	(China) Lu Kai (China) Huang Yaqiong
Canada	(South Korea) Lee Hyun-il	(Canada) Michelle Li	(Chinese Taipei) Liang Jui-wei (Chinese Taipei) Lu Chia-bin	(South Korea) Choi Hye-in (South Korea) Lee So-hee	(Germany) Max Schwenger (Germany) Carla Nelte
U.S	(Vietnam) Nguyễn Tiến Minh	(United States) Beiwen Zhang	(Thailand) Maneepong Jongjit (Thailand) Nipitphon Phuangphuapet	(Indonesia) Shendy Puspa Irawati (Indonesia) Vita Marissa	(Indonesia) Muhammad Rijal (Indonesia) Vita Marissa
Chinese Taipei	(China) Lin Dan	(South Korea) Sung Ji-hyun	(Indonesia) Andrei Adistia (Indonesia) Hendra Aprida Gunawan	(Indonesia) Nitya Krishinda Maheswari (Indonesia) Greysia Polii	(China) Liu Yuchen (China) Yu Xiaohan
Russia	(Russia) Vladimir Ivanov	(Japan) Aya Ohori	(Japan) Kenta Kazuno (Japan) Kazushi Yamada	(Japan) Yuriko Miki (Japan) Koharu Yonemoto	(Japan) Ryota Taohata (Japan) Misato Aratama
Brazil	(Republic of Ireland) Scott Evans	(United States) Beiwen Zhang	(Germany) Max Schwenger (Germany) Josche Zurwonne	(Germany) Johanna Goliszewski (Germany) Carla Nelte	(Germany) Max Schwenger (Germany) Carla Nelte
Vietnam	(Indonesia) Dionysius Hayom Rumbaka	(Japan) Nozomi Okuhara	(Indonesia) Andrei Adistia (Indonesia) Hendra Aprida Gunawan	(Indonesia) Maretha Dea Giovani (Indonesia) Rosyita Eka Putri Sari	(Indonesia) Muhammad Rijal (Indonesia) Vita Marissa
Indonesia	(India) H. S. Prannoy	(Indonesia) Adriyanti Firdasari	(Indonesia) Markus Fernaldi Gideon (Indonesia) Markis Kido	(Indonesia) Shendy Puspa Irawati (Indonesia) Vita Marissa	(Indonesia) Riky Widianto (Indonesia) Richi Puspita Dili
Netherlands	(India) Ajay Jayaram	(United States) Beiwen Zhang	(France) Baptiste Carême (France) Ronan Labar	(Netherlands) Eefje Muskens (Netherlands) Selena Piek	(Indonesia) Riky Widianto (Indonesia) Richi Puspita Dili
Bitburger	(Chinese Taipei) Chou Tien-chen	(China) Sun Yu	(China) Wang Yilyu (China) Zhang Wen	(China) Ou Dongni (China) Yu Xiaohan	(China) Zheng Siwei (China) Chen Qingchen
Korea	(South Korea) Lee Dong-keun	(Japan) Nozomi Okuhara	(South Korea) Lee Yong-dae (South Korea) Yoo Yeon-seong	(South Korea) Lee So-hee (South Korea) Shin Seung-chan	(South Korea) Choi Sol-gyu (South Korea) Shin Seung-chan
Scottish	(Finland) Ville Lang	(Japan) Sayaka Sato	(Denmark) Mathias Christiansen (Denmark) David Daugaard	(Bulgaria) Gabriela Stoeva (Bulgaria) Stefani Stoeva	(Scotland) Robert Blair (Scotland) Imogen Bankier
Macau	(China) Xue Song	(India) Pusarla Venkata Sindhu	(Singapore) Danny Bawa Chrisnanta (Singapore) Chayut Triyachart	(China) Ou Dongni (China) Yu Xiaohan	(Indonesia) Edi Subaktiar (Indonesia) Gloria Emanuelle Widjaja
U.S.	(Chinese Taipei) Hsu Jen-hao	(United States) Beiwen Zhang	(Poland) Adam Cwalina (Poland) Przemysław Wacha	(Chinese Taipei) Hsieh Pei-chen (Chinese Taipei) Wu Ti-jung	(Germany) Peter Käsbauer (Germany) Isabel Herttrich

=== Performance by countries ===
Tabulated below are the Grand Prix performances based on countries. Only countries who have won a title are listed:

Team	IND	GER	SUI	MAS	NZL	CHN	CAN	USA	TPE	RUS	BRA	VIE	INA	NED	GER	KOR	SCO	MAC	USA	Total
China	4		3	3		5			2						4			2		23
Indonesia				1	2			2	2			4	4	1				1		17
Japan		3			1					4		1				1	1			11
South Korea							2		1							4				7
Chinese Taipei					1		1								1				2	5
Germany							1				3								1	5
India	1	1											1	1				1		5
USA								1			1			1					1	4
Denmark			1														1			2
Singapore				1														1		2
Scotland		1															1			2
Australia					1															1
Canada							1													1
England			1																	1
Thailand								1												1
Vietnam								1												1
Russia										1										1
Ireland											1									1
Netherlands														1						1
France														1						1
Bulgaria																	1			1
Finland																	1			1
Poland																			1	1

== Grand Prix Gold ==
=== India Grand Prix Gold ===
Category	Winners	Runners-up	Score
Men's singles	(China) Xue Song	(India) Srikanth Kidambi	16–21, 21–19, 21–13
Women's singles	(India) Saina Nehwal	(India) Pusarla Venkata Sindhu	21–14, 21–17
Men's doubles	(China) Li Junhui / Liu Yuchen	(China) Huang Kaixiang / Zheng Siwei	21–17, 19–21, 22–20
Women's doubles	(China) Chen Qingchen / Jia Yifan	(China) Huang Yaqiong / Yu Xiaohan	22–24, 21–19, 21–11
Mixed doubles	(China) Wang Yilyu / Huang Yaqiong	(China) Huang Kaixiang / Chen Qingchen	21–18, 21–14

=== German Open ===
Category	Winners	Runners-up	Score
Men's singles	(India) Arvind Bhat	(Denmark) Hans-Kristian Vittinghus	24–22, 19–21, 21–11
Women's singles	(Japan) Sayaka Takahashi	(South Korea) Sung Ji-hyun	21–17, 8–21, 21–12
Men's doubles	(Japan) Takeshi Kamura / Keigo Sonoda	(Japan) Hiroyuki Endo / Kenichi Hayakawa	21–19, 14–21, 21–14
Women's doubles	(Japan) Misaki Matsutomo / Ayaka Takahashi	(South Korea) Jung Kyung-eun / Kim Ha-na	23–21, 24–22
Mixed doubles	(Scotland) Robert Blair / Imogen Bankier	(South Korea) Ko Sung-hyun / Kim Ha-na	21–15, 21–18

=== Swiss Open ===
Category	Winners	Runners-up	Score
Men's singles	(Denmark) Viktor Axelsen	(China) Tian Houwei	21–7, 16–21, 25–23
Women's singles	(China) Wang Yihan	(China) Sun Yu	21–23, 21–9, 21–11
Men's doubles	(China) Chai Biao / Hong Wei	(China) Fu Haifeng / Zhang Nan	22–20, 21–14
Women's doubles	(China) Bao Yixin / Tang Jinhua	(Indonesia) Nitya Krishinda Maheswari / Greysia Polii	19–21, 21–16, 21–13
Mixed doubles	(England) Chris Adcock / Gabby Adcock	(China) Chai Biao / Tang Jinhua	21–17, 21–13

=== Malaysia Grand Prix Gold ===
Category	Winners	Runners-up	Score
Men's singles	(Indonesia) Simon Santoso	(India) Sourabh Varma	15–21, 21–16, 21–19
Women's singles	(China) Yao Xue	(Indonesia) Adriyanti Firdasari	21–18, 21–8
Men's doubles	(Singapore) Danny Bawa Chrisnanta / Chayut Triyachart	(Malaysia) Goh V Shem / Lim Khim Wah	21–17, 22–20
Women's doubles	(China) Huang Yaqiong / Yu Xiaohan	(China) Ou Dongni / Xiong Mengjing	22–20, 12–21, 21–18
Mixed doubles	(China) Lu Kai / Huang Yaqiong	(Indonesia) Praveen Jordan / Debby Susanto	21–14, 21–13

=== China Masters ===
Category	Winners	Runners-up	Score
Men's singles	(China) Lin Dan	(China) Tian Houwei	21–14, 21–9
Women's singles	(China) Liu Xin	(China) Shen Yaying	21–12, 21–18
Men's doubles	(China) Kang Jun / Liu Cheng	(China) Wang Yilyu / Zhang Wen	21–13, 21–16
Women's doubles	(China) Luo Ying / Luo Yu	(China) Huang Yaqiong / Yu Xiaohan	21–17, 21–19
Mixed doubles	(China) Lu Kai / Huang Yaqiong	(China) Wang Yilyu / Xia Huan	21–12, 21–14

=== U.S. Open ===
Category	Winners	Runners-up	Score
Men's singles	(Vietnam) Nguyễn Tiến Minh	(Chinese Taipei) Chou Tien-chen	21–19, 14–21, 21–19
Women's singles	(United States) Beiwen Zhang	(Japan) Kana Ito	21–8, 21–17
Men's doubles	(Thailand) Maneepong Jongjit / Nipitphon Phuangphuapet	(Denmark) Mathias Boe / Carsten Mogensen	21–17, 15–21, 21–18
Women's doubles	(Indonesia) Shendy Puspa Irawati / Vita Marissa	(Thailand) Puttita Supajirakul / Sapsiree Taerattanachai	21–15, 21–10
Mixed doubles	(Indonesia) Muhammad Rijal / Vita Marissa	(Thailand) Maneepong Jongjit / Sapsiree Taerattanachai	21–16, 21–19

=== Chinese Taipei Open ===
Category	Winners	Runners-up	Score
Men's singles	(China) Lin Dan	(China) Wang Zhengming	21–19, 21–14
Women's singles	(South Korea) Sung Ji-hyun	(China) Liu Xin	21–13, 21–18
Men's doubles	(Indonesia) Andrei Adistia / Hendra Aprida Gunawan	(China) Li Junhui / Liu Yuchen	21–14, 16–21, 21–16
Women's doubles	(Indonesia) Nitya Krishinda Maheswari / Greysia Polii	(China) Wang Xiaoli / Yu Yang	21–18, 21–11
Mixed doubles	(China) Liu Yuchen / Yu Xiaohan	(Indonesia) Alfian Eko Prasetya / Annisa Saufika	21–12, 21–14

=== Indonesian Masters ===
Category	Winners	Runners-up	Score
Men's singles	(India) H. S. Prannoy	(Indonesia) Firman Abdul Kholik	21–11, 22–20
Women's singles	(Indonesia) Adriyanti Firdasari	(Indonesia) Ruselli Hartawan	21–14, 21–14
Men's doubles	(Indonesia) Markus Fernaldi Gideon / Markis Kido	(Indonesia) Selvanus Geh / Kevin Sanjaya Sukamuljo	21–17, 20–22, 21–14
Women's doubles	(Indonesia) Shendy Puspa Irawati / Vita Marissa	(Indonesia) Keshya Nurvita Hanadia / Devi Tika Permatasari	23–21, 21–13
Mixed doubles	(Indonesia) Riky Widianto / Richi Puspita Dili	(Indonesia) Muhammad Rijal / Vita Marissa	21–18, 21–19

=== Bitburger Open ===
Category	Winners	Runners-up	Score
Men's singles	(Chinese Taipei) Chou Tien-chen	(Republic of Ireland) Scott Evans	21–17, 21–10
Women's singles	(China) Sun Yu	(China) He Bingjiao	16–21, 21–15, 21–12
Men's doubles	(China) Wang Yilyu / Zhang Wen	(Denmark) Anders Skaarup Rasmussen / Kim Astrup	21–14, 21–10
Women's doubles	(China) Ou Dongni / Yu Xiaohan	(Russia) Ekaterina Bolotova / Evgeniya Kosetskaya	21–15, 21–15
Mixed doubles	(China) Zheng Siwei / Chen Qingchen	(Indonesia) Alfian Eko Prasetya / Annisa Saufika	21–11, 21–13

=== Macau Open ===
Category	Winners	Runners-up	Score
Men's singles	(China) Xue Song	(Hong Kong) Wong Wing Ki	16–21, 21–13, 21–19
Women's singles	(India) Pusarla Venkata Sindhu	(South Korea) Kim Hyo-min	21–12, 21–17
Men's doubles	(Singapore) Danny Bawa Chrisnanta / Chayut Triyachart	(Indonesia) Angga Pratama / Ricky Karanda Suwardi	21–19, 22–20
Women's doubles	(China) Ou Dongni / Yu Xiaohan	(China) Huang Yaqiong / Zhong Qianxin	19–21, 21–19, 21–7
Mixed doubles	(Indonesia) Edi Subaktiar / Gloria Emanuelle Widjaja	(Singapore) Danny Bawa Chrisnanta / Vanessa Neo Yu Yan	21–15, 29–30, 22–20

== Grand Prix ==
=== New Zealand Open ===
Category	Winners	Runners-up	Score
Men's singles	(Chinese Taipei) Wang Tzu-wei	(Chinese Taipei) Hsu Jen-hao	21–9, 21–13
Women's singles	(Japan) Nozomi Okuhara	(Japan) Kana Ito	21–15, 21–3
Men's doubles	(Indonesia) Selvanus Geh / Kevin Sanjaya Sukamuljo	(Chinese Taipei) Chen Hung-ling / Lu Chia-bin	15–21, 23–21, 21–11
Women's doubles	(Australia) Tang Hetian / Renuga Veeran	(Japan) Shizuka Matsuo / Mami Naito	21–13, 10–21, 21–18
Mixed doubles	(Indonesia) Alfian Eko Prasetya / Annisa Saufika	(Indonesia) Edi Subaktiar / Melati Daeva Oktaviani	21–18, 17–21, 21–12

=== Canada Open ===
Category	Winners	Runners-up	Score
Men's singles	(South Korea) Lee Hyun-il	(Hong Kong) Ng Ka Long	21–16, 21–14
Women's singles	(Canada) Michelle Li	(Chinese Taipei) Pai Yu-po	21–16, 23–21
Men's doubles	(Chinese Taipei) Liang Jui-wei / Lu Chia-bin	(Chinese Taipei) Liao Min-chun / Tseng Min-hao	21–18, 16–21, 21–16
Women's doubles	(South Korea) Choi Hye-in / Lee So-hee	(South Korea) Park So-young / Park Sun-young	21–15, 21–18
Mixed doubles	(Germany) Max Schwenger / Carla Nelte	(Netherlands) Jorrit de Ruiter / Samantha Barning	21–18, 23–21

=== Russia Open ===
Category	Winners	Runners-up	Score
Men's singles	(Russia) Vladimir Ivanov	(Japan) Riichi Takeshita	18–21, 21–5, 21–17
Women's singles	(Japan) Aya Ohori	(Japan) Shizuka Uchida	21–19, 21–4
Men's doubles	(Japan) Kenta Kazuno / Kazushi Yamada	(Japan) Takuto Inoue / Yuki Kaneko	19–21, 22–20, 21–13
Women's doubles	(Japan) Yuriko Miki / Koharu Yonemoto	(Japan) Mayu Matsumoto / Wakana Nagahara	21–17, 21–7
Mixed doubles	(Japan) Ryota Taohata / Misato Aratama	(Russia) Ivan Sozonov / Olga Morozova	21–12, 21–10

=== Brazil Open ===
Category	Winners	Runners-up	Score
Men's singles	(Republic of Ireland) Scott Evans	(Germany) Dieter Domke	7–11, 6–11, 11–6, 11–8, 11–7
Women's singles	(United States) Beiwen Zhang	(Japan) Kaori Imabeppu	6–11, 11–5, 4–11, 11–8, 11–9
Men's doubles	(Germany) Max Schwenger / Josche Zurwonne	(Germany) Raphael Beck / Andreas Heinz	11–9, 11–6, 11–4
Women's doubles	(Germany) Johanna Goliszewski / Carla Nelte	(Bulgaria) Stefani Stoeva / Gabriela Stoeva	11–5, 11–7, 4–11, 11–10
Mixed doubles	(Germany) Max Schwenger / Carla Nelte	(Republic of Ireland) Sam Magee / Chloe Magee	10–11, 10–11, 11–10, 11–8, 11–7

=== Vietnam Open ===
Category	Winners	Runners-up	Score
Men's singles	(Indonesia) Dionysius Hayom Rumbaka	(India) H. S. Prannoy	18–21, 21–15, 21–18
Women's singles	(Japan) Nozomi Okuhara	(Japan) Aya Ohori	21–15, 21–11
Men's doubles	(Indonesia) Andrei Adistia / Hendra Aprida Gunawan	(Japan) Kenta Kazuno / Kazushi Yamada	15–21, 23–21, 21–17
Women's doubles	(Indonesia) Maretha Dea Giovani / Rosyita Eka Putri Sari	(Indonesia) Gebby Ristiyani Imawan / Ni Ketut Mahadewi Istirani	21–19, 15–21, 21–10
Mixed doubles	(Indonesia) Muhammad Rijal / Vita Marissa	(Indonesia) Irfan Fadhilah / Weni Anggraini	21–18, 21–10

=== Dutch Open ===
Category	Winners	Runners-up	Score
Men's singles	(India) Ajay Jayaram	(Indonesia) Ihsan Maulana Mustofa	10–11, 11–6, 11–7, 1–11, 11–9
Women's singles	(United States) Beiwen Zhang	(Chinese Taipei) Pai Yu-po	11–9, 11–7, 11–8
Men's doubles	(France) Baptiste Carême / Ronan Labar	(Indonesia) Fran Kurniawan / Agripinna Prima Rahmanto Putra	5–11, 11–10, 11–10, 11–7
Women's doubles	(Netherlands) Eefje Muskens / Selena Piek	(Indonesia) Shendy Puspa Irawati / Vita Marissa	11–8, 4–11, 11–9, 11–10
Mixed doubles	(Indonesia) Riky Widianto / Richi Puspita Dili	(Netherlands) Jorrit de Ruiter / Samantha Barning	11–10, 10–11, 9–11, 11–8, 11–1

=== Korea Grand Prix ===
Category	Winners	Runners-up	Score
Men's singles	(South Korea) Lee Dong-keun	(South Korea) Lee Hyun-il	21–18, 24–22
Women's singles	(Japan) Nozomi Okuhara	(Japan) Sayaka Sato	21–17, 21–13
Men's doubles	(South Korea) Lee Yong-dae / Yoo Yeon-seong	(South Korea) Ko Sung-hyun / Shin Baek-cheol	21–18, 21–19
Women's doubles	(South Korea) Lee So-hee / Shin Seung-chan	(South Korea) Jang Ye-na / Yoo Hae-won	15–8 Retired
Mixed doubles	(South Korea) Choi Sol-gyu / Shin Seung-chan	(South Korea) Shin Baek-cheol / Jang Ye-na	Walkover

=== Scottish Open ===
Category	Winners	Runners-up	Score
Men's singles	(Finland) Ville Lang	(Chinese Taipei) Wang Tzu-wei	17–21, 22–20, 21–16
Women's singles	(Japan) Sayaka Sato	(Spain) Beatriz Corrales	21–18, 21–9
Men's doubles	(Denmark) Mathias Christiansen / David Daugaard	(Germany) Raphael Beck / Andreas Heinz	21–13, 21–17
Women's doubles	(Bulgaria) Gabriela Stoeva / Stefani Stoeva	(England) Heather Olver / Lauren Smith	21–7, 21–15
Mixed doubles	(Scotland) Robert Blair / Imogen Bankier	(Denmark) Niclas Nohr / Sara Thygesen	21–18, 21–14

=== U.S. Open ===
Category	Winners	Runners-up	Score
Men's singles	(Chinese Taipei) Hsu Jen-hao	(Czech Republic) Petr Koukal	21–19, 19–21, 21–8
Women's singles	(United States) Beiwen Zhang	(Canada) Rachael Honderich	21–11, 21–13
Men's doubles	(Poland) Adam Cwalina / Przemysław Wacha	(Japan) Taiki Shimada / Yoshinori Takeuchi	21–13, 21–6
Women's doubles	(Chinese Taipei) Hsieh Pei-chen / Wu Ti-jung	(United States) Eva Lee / Paula Lynn Obañana	21–16, 21–10
Mixed doubles	(Germany) Peter Käsbauer / Isabel Herttrich	(United States) Howard Shu / Eva Lee	21–12, 21–14
