= 2014 German Open Grand Prix Gold =

Tournament details
- Dates: February 25, 2014 - March 2, 2014
- Total prize money: US$120,000
- Venue: RWE-Sporthalle
- Location: Mulheim an der Ruhr, Germany

Champions
- Men's singles: (India) Arvind Bhat
- Women's singles: (Japan) Sayaka Takahashi
- Men's doubles: (Japan) Takeshi Kamura (Japan) Keigo Sonoda
- Women's doubles: (Japan) Misaki Matsutomo (Japan) Ayaka Takahashi
- Mixed doubles: (Scotland) Robert Blair (Scotland) Imogen Bankier

The 2014 German Open Grand Prix Gold was the second grand prix gold and grand prix tournament of the 2014 BWF Grand Prix Gold and Grand Prix. The tournament was held in RWE-Sporthalle, Mulheim an der Ruhr, Germany from February 25 until March 2, 2014 and had a total purse of $120,000.

== Players by nation ==
Nation	First round	Second round	Third round	Quarterfinals	Semifinals	Final
(Germany)	10	5		3	1	
(Indonesia)	10					
(Russia)	7					
(Denmark)	6	4		1		1
(Chinese Taipei)	6	3		3	1	
(Malaysia)	5	2	1	2	1	
(Hong Kong)	5	1	1	2		
(Netherlands)	5	2			1	
(France)	5	2				
(England)	4	4				
(United States)	4	1				
(Thailand)	3	1		1	3	
(Bulgaria)	3	1				
(Singapore)	3		1	1		
(Poland)	3				1	
(Belgium)	2	1				
(Republic of Ireland)	2	1				
(Scotland)	2	1				
(Ukraine)	2					
(South Korea)	1		1	5		3
(Japan)	1	3	2	2	1	1
(Finland)	1	1				
(Sweden)	1	1				
(Norway)	1					
(Estonia)	1					
(Israel)	1					
(Canada)	1					
(India)		3	2			
(Spain)		2			1	
(Czech Republic)		2				
(Austria)		1				
(Sri Lanka)		1				

== Men's singles ==
=== Seeds ===
1. (Indonesia) Tommy Sugiarto (withdrew)
2. (Thailand) Boonsak Ponsana (second round)
3. (Hong Kong) Hu Yun (second round)
4. (Germany) Marc Zwiebler (semi-final)
5. (Thailand) Tanongsak Saensomboonsuk (first round)
6. (South Korea) Son Wan-ho (quarter-final)
7. (Japan) Kento Momota (third round)
8. (Japan) Takuma Ueda (third round)
9. (India) Kashyap Parupalli (second round)
10. (Indonesia) Dionysius Hayom Rumbaka (first round)
11. (England) Rajiv Ouseph (second round)
12. (Denmark) Hans-Kristian Vittinghus (final)
13. (Japan) Sho Sasaki (quarter-final)
14. (Denmark) Viktor Axelsen (quarter-final)
15. (Chinese Taipei) Chou Tien-chen (semi-final)
16. (Chinese Taipei) Hsu Jen-hao (quarter-final)

=== Finals ===
Quarterfinals
15	(Chinese Taipei) Chou Tien-chen	22	21
13	(Japan) Sho Sasaki	20	17
(India) Arvind Bhat	21	21
14	(Denmark) Viktor Axelsen	17	14
6	(South Korea) Son Wan-ho	17	19
4	(Germany) Marc Zwiebler	21	21
16	(Chinese Taipei) Hsu Jen-hao	9	6
12	(Denmark) Hans-Kristian Vittinghus	21	21

Semifinals
15	(Chinese Taipei) Chou Tien-chen	12	21	20
(India) Arvind Bhat	21	12	22
4	(Germany) Marc Zwiebler	16	13
12	(Denmark) Hans-Kristian Vittinghus	21	21

Final
(India) Arvind Bhat	24	19	21
12	(Denmark) Hans-Kristian Vittinghus	22	21	11

=== Top half ===
==== Section 1 ====
First Round
PFQ	(Slovenia) I Utrosa	18	21	21
(Finland) E Heino	21	18	12
(India) A Pawar	21	21
(Malaysia) Tan CS	16	17
15	(Chinese Taipei) Chou T-c	20	21	21
Q1	(Bulgaria) S Makarski	22	13	12
(Germany) L Schmidt	19	12
(Denmark) C Thomsen	21	21

Second Round
PFQ	(Slovenia) I Utrosa	16	12
(India) A Pawar	21	21
15	(Chinese Taipei) Chou T-c	21	21
(Denmark) C Thomsen	17	17

Third Round
(India) A Pawar	14	11
15	(Chinese Taipei) Chou T-c	21	21

==== Section 2 ====
First Round
5	(Thailand) T Saensomboonsuk	11	21
(South Korea) Lee D-k	21	23
PFQ	(Poland) M Rogalski	21	19	17
(Czech Republic) P Koukal	19	21	21
13	(Japan) S Sasaki	16	21	25
(Germany) D Domke	21	16	23
PFQ	(Netherlands) E Meijs	15	11
(Spain) P Abián	21	21

Second Round
(South Korea) Lee D-k	21	21
(Czech Republic) P Koukal	18	14
13	(Japan) S Sasaki	21	17	21
(Spain) P Abián	18	21	11

Third Round
(South Korea) Lee D-k	13	15
13	(Japan) S Sasaki	21	21

==== Section 3 ====
First Round
3	(Hong Kong) Hu Y	14	21	21
Q4	(Denmark) K Bruun	21	12	17
(India) A Bhat	21	21
Q5	(Germany) A Trisnanto	18	12
11	(England) R Ouseph	21	21
Q8	(Norway) M Myhre	6	12
(France) T Rouxel	12	18
(Malaysia) D Liew	21	21

Second Round
3	(Hong Kong) Hu Y	17	21	11
(India) A Bhat	21	16	21
11	(England) R Ouseph	19	19
(Malaysia) D Liew	21	21

Third Round
(India) A Bhat	21	21
(Malaysia) D Liew	14	12

==== Section 4 ====
First Round
7	(Japan) K Momota	22	21
(Estonia) R Must	20	11
(Singapore) A Chen	17	16
PFQ	(Austria) D Obernosterer	21	21
14	(Denmark) V Axelsen	14
(Belgium) Y Tan	4^{r}
PFQ	(Sweden) M Borg	21	21
(Malaysia) Chan KB	15	17

Second Round
7	(Japan) K Momota	21	21
PFQ	(Austria) D Obernosterer	11	14
14	(Denmark) V Axelsen	21	21
PFQ	(Sweden) M Borg	17	14

Third Round
7	(Japan) K Momota	17	12
14	(Denmark) V Axelsen	21	21

=== Bottom half ===
==== Section 5 ====
First Round
(India) P Kumar	21	21
(United States) S Pongnairat	12	19
(Israel) M Zilberman	14	17
9	(India) K Parupalli	21	21
Q3	(Germany) C Skrzeba	17	13
PFQ	(Chinese Taipei) Wang T-w	21	21
PFQ	(England) T Penty	17	8
6	(South Korea) Son W-h	21	21

Second Round
(India) P Kumar	21	21
9	(India) K Parupalli	19	18
PFQ	(Chinese Taipei) Wang T-w	18	16
6	(South Korea) Son W-h	21	21

Third Round
(India) P Kumar	14	15
6	(South Korea) Son W-h	21	21

==== Section 6 ====
First Round
(Denmark) R Fladberg	19	21	12
(Sri Lanka) N Karunaratne	21	18	21
(Singapore) D Wong	21	21
10	(Indonesia) D Rumbaka	13	15
(France) B Leverdez	21	21	19
(Finland) V Lang	23	3	21
(Indonesia) W Prasetyo	14	21	21
4	(Germany) M Zwiebler	21	16	23

Second Round
(Sri Lanka) N Karunaratne	20	22	5
(Singapore) D Wong	22	20	21
(Finland) V Lang	14	20
4	(Germany) M Zwiebler	21	22

Third Round
(Singapore) D Wong	15	6
4	(Germany) M Zwiebler	21	21

==== Section 7 ====
First Round
(Republic of Ireland) S Evans	21	18	21
Q2	(Malaysia) B Wong	9	21	13
Q6	(Indonesia) I Mustofa	17	13^{r}
16	(Chinese Taipei) Hsu J-h	21	10
(Malaysia) R Misbun	23	19	24
(Indonesia) A Tedjono	21	21	22
Q7	(Netherlands) N Fransman	7	10
8	(Japan) T Ueda	21	21

Second Round
(Republic of Ireland) S Evans	21	15	18
16	(Chinese Taipei) Hsu J-h	12	21	21
(Malaysia) R Misbun	14	17
8	(Japan) T Ueda	21	21

Third Round
16	(Chinese Taipei) Hsu J-h	16	21	21
8	(Japan) T Ueda	21	17	12

==== Section 8 ====
First Round
(Malaysia) A Abdul Latif	21	21
(Denmark) E Holst	17	16
(Netherlands) E Pang	11	17
12	(Denmark) H Vittinghus	21	21
(Ukraine) D Zavadsky	21	19	17
(Hong Kong) Wei N	18	21	21
(Indonesia) R Subagja	14	15
2	(Thailand) B Ponsana	21	21

Second Round
(Malaysia) A Abdul Latif	21	14	12
12	(Denmark) H Vittinghus	19	21	21
(Hong Kong) Wei N	21	21
2	(Thailand) B Ponsana	17	14

Third Round
12	(Denmark) H Vittinghus	21	14	21
(Hong Kong) Wei N	11	21	18

== Women's singles ==
=== Seeds ===
1. (South Korea) Sung Ji-hyun (final)
2. (South Korea) Bae Yeon-ju (quarter-final)
3. (Chinese Taipei) Tai Tzu-ying (first round)
4. (Thailand) Porntip Buranaprasertsuk (first round)
5. (Thailand) Nichaon Jindapon (semi-final)
6. (Japan) Sayaka Takahashi (champion)
7. (Japan) Eriko Hirose (quarter-final)
8. (Spain) Carolina Marín (semi-final)

=== Finals ===
Semifinals
1	(South Korea) Sung Ji-hyun	21	21
5	(Thailand) Nichaon Jindapon	16	16
8	(Spain) Carolina Marín	21	13	19
6	(Japan) Sayaka Takahashi	18	21	21

Final
1	(South Korea) Sung Ji-hyun	17	21	12
6	(Japan) Sayaka Takahashi	21	8	21

=== Top half ===
==== Section 1 ====
First Round
1	(South Korea) Sung J-h	21	21
(Singapore) Gu J	17	17
(Hong Kong) Chan TK	12	19
(Japan) M Mitani	21	21
7	(Japan) E Hirose	21	21
(Bulgaria) P Nedelcheva	15	19
Q3	(Denmark) L Kjaersfeldt	21	20	19
(India) A Pantawane	17	22	21

Second Round
1	(South Korea) Sung J-h	22	21
(Japan) M Mitani	20	14
7	(Japan) E Hirose	21	21
(India) A Pantawane	18	16

Quarterfinals
1	(South Korea) Sung J-h	21	21
7	(Japan) E Hirose	16	13

==== Section 2 ====
First Round
3	(Chinese Taipei) Tai T-y	16	12
(Thailand) B Ongbumrungpan	21	21
(Russia) N Perminova	9	21	18
(France) S Vignes Waran	21	19	21
5	(Thailand) N Jindapon	21	21
(Republic of Ireland) C Magee	12	13
(United States) J Subandhi	21	12	8^{r}
(Spain) B Corrales	14	21	13

Second Round
(Thailand) B Ongbumrungpan	21	21
(France) S Vignes Waran	13	8
5	(Thailand) N Jindapon	21	21
(Spain) B Corrales	9	19

Quarterfinals
(Thailand) B Ongbumrungpan	18	21	15
5	(Thailand) N Jindapon	21	10	21

=== Bottom half ===
==== Section 3 ====
First Round
Q1	(Ukraine) M Ulitina	6	19
(Scotland) K Gilmour	21	21
(Switzerland) S Jaquet	14	1^{r}
8	(Spain) C Marín	21	5
Q4	(Chinese Taipei) Pai Y-p	16	19
(Chinese Taipei) Pai H-m	21	21
PFQ	(Germany) K Schnaase	21	21
4	(Thailand) P Buranaprasertsuk	16	18

Second Round
(Scotland) K Gilmour	18	13
8	(Spain) C Marín	21	21
(Chinese Taipei) Pai H-m	21	21
PFQ	(Germany) K Schnaase	8	14

Quarterfinals
8	(Spain) C Marín	15	21	21
(Chinese Taipei) Pai H-m	21	15	11

==== Section 4 ====
First Round
(Canada) M Li	21	19	17
Q2	(India) P Thulasi	7	21	21
(Hong Kong) Yip PY	14	14
6	(Japan) S Takahashi	21	21
(Indonesia) M Kusumastuti	13	15
(Czech Republic) K Gavnholt	21	21
(United States) Zhang BW	18	11
2	(South Korea) Bae Y-j	21	21

Second Round
Q2	(India) P Thulasi	17	11
6	(Japan) S Takahashi	21	21
(Czech Republic) K Gavnholt	14	17
2	(South Korea) Bae Y-j	21	21

Quarterfinals
6	(Japan) S Takahashi	21	21
2	(South Korea) Bae Y-j	16	19

== Men's doubles ==
=== Seeds ===
1. (Japan) Hiroyuki Endo / Kenichi Hayakawa (final)
2. (Malaysia) Hoon Thien How / Tan Wee Kiong (semi-final)
3. (Indonesia) Angga Pratama / Rian Agung Saputro (withdrew)
4. (Chinese Taipei) Lee Sheng-mu / Tsai Chia-hsin (quarter-final)
5. (England) Chris Adcock / Andrew Ellis (first round)
6. (Thailand) Maneepong Jongjit / Nipitphon Puangpuapech (semi-final)
7. (Malaysia) Goh V Shem / Lim Khim Wah (quarter-final)
8. (Japan) Takeshi Kamura / Keigo Sonoda (champion)

=== Finals ===
Semifinals
1	(Japan) Hiroyuki Endo (Japan) Kenichi Hayakawa	17	21	21
6	(Thailand) Maneepong Jongjit (Thailand) Nipitphon Puangpuapech	21	16	12
8	(Japan) Takeshi Kamura (Japan) Keigo Sonoda	21	21
2	(Malaysia) Hoon Thien How (Malaysia) Tan Wee Kiong	19	14

Final
1	(Japan) Hiroyuki Endo (Japan) Kenichi Hayakawa	19	21	14
8	(Japan) Takeshi Kamura (Japan) Keigo Sonoda	21	14	21

=== Top half ===
==== Section 1 ====
First Round
1	(Japan) H Endo (Japan) K Hayakawa	21	21
Q2	(Germany) F Holzer (Germany) M Lamsfuss	14	7
Q1	(Germany) J Jansen (Germany) A Trisnanto	21	14	19
PFQ	(Belgium) M Dierickx (Belgium) F Golinski	17	21	21
7	(Malaysia) Goh VS (Malaysia) Lim KW	22	23
(Hong Kong) Chan YL (Hong Kong) Lee CH	20	21
(Chinese Taipei) Liang J-w (Chinese Taipei) Liao K-h	16	11
(Germany) M Fuchs (Germany) J Schoettler	21	21

Second Round
1	(Japan) H Endo (Japan) K Hayakawa	21	21
PFQ	(Belgium) M Dierickx (Belgium) F Golinski	7	14
7	(Malaysia) Goh VS (Malaysia) Lim KW	21	16	21
(Germany) M Fuchs (Germany) J Schoettler	18	21	19

Quarterfinals
1	(Japan) H Endo (Japan) K Hayakawa	14	21	21
7	(Malaysia) Goh VS (Malaysia) Lim KW	21	16	15

==== Section 2 ====
First Round
PFQ	(England) P Briggs (England) H Towler	19	19
(Netherlands) R Bosch (Netherlands) K Ridder	21	21
Q4	(Germany) A Heinz (Germany) M Schwenger	17	21	21
(Poland) L Moren (Poland) W Szkudlarczyk	21	19	14
6	(Thailand) M Jongjit (Thailand) N Puangpuapech	21	21
(Chinese Taipei) Chen H-l (Chinese Taipei) Lu C-b	14	13
PFQ	(France) L Constantin (France) M Lo Ying Ping	17	11
(Denmark) M Conrad-Petersen (Denmark) M Kolding	21	21

Second Round
(Netherlands) R Bosch (Netherlands) K Ridder	14	18
Q4	(Germany) A Heinz (Germany) M Schwenger	21	21
6	(Thailand) M Jongjit (Thailand) N Puangpuapech	20	21	21
(Denmark) M Conrad-Petersen (Denmark) M Kolding	22	19	13

Quarterfinals
Q4	(Germany) A Heinz (Germany) M Schwenger	18	21	17
6	(Thailand) M Jongjit (Thailand) N Puangpuapech	21	14	21

=== Bottom half ===
==== Section 3 ====
First Round
(United States) P Chew (United States) S Pongnairat
(Poland) A Cwalina (Poland) P Wacha	wo
(Denmark) A Rasmussen (Denmark) K Sorensen	21	17	15
8	(Japan) T Kamura (Japan) K Sonoda	15	21	21
(Malaysia) Gan TC (Malaysia) Ong SH	18	21	21
(Germany) P Kaesbauer (Germany) J Zurwonne	21	17	15
PFQ	(Germany) D Benz (Malaysia) Chan KB	16	12
4	(Chinese Taipei) Lee S-m (Chinese Taipei) Tsai C-h	21	21

Second Round
(United States) P Chew (United States) S Pongnairat	4	10
8	(Japan) T Kamura (Japan) K Sonoda	21	21
(Malaysia) Gan TC (Malaysia) Ong SH	14	18
4	(Chinese Taipei) Lee S-m (Chinese Taipei) Tsai C-h	21	21

Quarterfinals
8	(Japan) T Kamura (Japan) K Sonoda	23	21
4	(Chinese Taipei) Lee S-m (Chinese Taipei) Tsai C-h	21	14

==== Section 4 ====
First Round
(France) B Careme (France) R Labar	21	21
(Netherlands) J Arends (Netherlands) J Maas	16	12
(South Korea) Ko S-h (South Korea) Shin B-c	16	21	21
5	(England) C Adcock (England) A Ellis	21	19	6
(Japan) H Hashimoto (Japan) N Hirata	21	22
(Russia) N Khakimov (Russia) V Kuznetsov	6	20
Q3	(Denmark) N Nohr (Denmark) N Overgaard	17	16
2	(Malaysia) Hoon TH (Malaysia) Tan WK	21	21

Second Round
(France) B Careme (France) R Labar	14	16
(South Korea) Ko S-h (South Korea) Shin B-c	21	21
(Japan) H Hashimoto (Japan) N Hirata	14	18
2	(Malaysia) Hoon TH (Malaysia) Tan WK	21	21

Quarterfinals
(South Korea) Ko S-h (South Korea) Shin B-c	21	16	20
2	(Malaysia) Hoon TH (Malaysia) Tan WK	18	21	22

== Women's doubles ==
=== Seeds ===
1. (Japan) Misaki Matsutomo / Ayaka Takahashi (champion)
2. (South Korea) Jung Kyung-eun / Kim Ha-na (final)
3. (South Korea) Jang Ye-na / Kim So-young (quarter-final)
4. (Japan) Reika Kakiiwa / Miyuki Maeda (semi-final)
5. (Thailand) Duanganong Aroonkesorn / Kunchala Voravichitchaikul (second round)
6. (Malaysia) Vivian Hoo Kah Mun / Woon Khe Wei (quarter-final)
7. (South Korea) Lee So-hee / Shin Seung-chan (quarter-final)
8. (Netherlands) Eefje Muskens / Selena Piek (semi-final)

=== Finals ===
Semifinals
1	(Japan) Misaki Matsutomo (Japan) Ayaka Takahashi	22	21
8	(Netherlands) Eefje Muskens (Netherlands) Selena Piek	20	13
4	(Japan) Reika Kakiiwa (Japan) Miyuki Maeda	12	18
2	(South Korea) Jung Kyung-eun (South Korea) Kim Ha-na	21	21

Final
1	(Japan) Misaki Matsutomo (Japan) Ayaka Takahashi	23	24
2	(South Korea) Jung Kyung-eun (South Korea) Kim Ha-na	21	22

=== Top half ===
==== Section 1 ====
First Round
1	(Japan) M Matsutomo (Japan) A Takahashi	21	21
Q2	(Russia) E Bolotova (Russia) E Kosetskaya	15	8
(Germany) L Kaminski (Germany) H Pohl	5	14
(Japan) M Aratama (Japan) M Taruno	21	21
6	(Malaysia) V Hoo (Malaysia) Woon KW	21	21
(Belgium) S Annys (Belgium) S Corvilain	7	10
(Germany) K Kattenbeck (Germany) F Volkmann	13	22
(Chinese Taipei) Cheng C-y (Chinese Taipei) Wu T-j	21	24

Second Round
1	(Japan) M Matsutomo (Japan) A Takahashi	21	24
(Japan) M Aratama (Japan) M Taruno	12	22
6	(Malaysia) V Hoo (Malaysia) Woon KW	21	21
(Chinese Taipei) Cheng C-y (Chinese Taipei) Wu T-j	16	13

Quarterfinals
1	(Japan) M Matsutomo (Japan) A Takahashi	21	21
6	(Malaysia) V Hoo (Malaysia) Woon KW	14	11

==== Section 2 ====
First Round
3	(South Korea) Jang Y-n (South Korea) Kim S-y	21	25
(Singapore) S Sari (Singapore) Yao L	17	23
(England) G Adcock (England) L Smith	16	21	21
Q3	(Indonesia) A Saufika (Indonesia) G Widjaja	21	15	11
8	(Netherlands) E Muskens (Netherlands) S Piek	21	21
(Russia) A Chervaykova (Russia) N Vislova	7	19
(Thailand) P Supajirakul (Thailand) S Taerattanachai	21	17
(Germany) J Goliszewski (Germany) B Michels	23	21

Second Round
3	(South Korea) Jang Y-n (South Korea) Kim S-y	18	21	21
(England) G Adcock (England) L Smith	21	6	18
8	(Netherlands) E Muskens (Netherlands) S Piek	21	21
(Germany) J Goliszewski (Germany) B Michels	6	18

Quarterfinals
3	(South Korea) Jang Y-n (South Korea) Kim S-y	21	17	13
8	(Netherlands) E Muskens (Netherlands) S Piek	19	21	21

=== Bottom half ===
==== Section 3 ====
First Round
Q4	(Hong Kong) Chan TK (Hong Kong) Tse YS	13	21	21
Q1	(Hong Kong) Chau HW (Hong Kong) Poon LY	21	9	15
(Chinese Taipei) Cheng W-h (Chinese Taipei) Hsieh P-c	9	15
5	(Thailand) D Aroonkesorn (Thailand) K Voravichitchaikul	21	21
(Bulgaria) G Stoeva (Bulgaria) S Stoeva	21	21
(France) A Fontaine (France) E Lefel	16	12
(Scotland) J Cooper (Scotland) K Gilmour	13	12
4	(Japan) R Kakiiwa (Japan) M Maeda	21	21

Second Round
Q4	(Hong Kong) Chan TK (Hong Kong) Tse YS	21	21
5	(Thailand) D Aroonkesorn (Thailand) K Voravichitchaikul	8	20
(Bulgaria) G Stoeva (Bulgaria) S Stoeva	11	16
4	(Japan) R Kakiiwa (Japan) M Maeda	21	21

Quarterfinals
Q4	(Hong Kong) Chan TK (Hong Kong) Tse YS	17	16
4	(Japan) R Kakiiwa (Japan) M Maeda	21	21

==== Section 4 ====
First Round
(Germany) I Herttrich (Germany) C Nelte	21	21
(Russia) I Khlebko (Russia) K Polikarpova	17	12
PFQ	(Chinese Taipei) Hsu Y-c (Chinese Taipei) Pai Y-p	15	12
7	(South Korea) Lee S-h (South Korea) Shin S-c	21	21
(England) H Olver (England) K Robertshaw	21	21
(Netherlands) S Barning (Netherlands) I Tabeling	15	14
(Scotland) I Bankier (Bulgaria) P Nedelcheva	21	15	12
2	(South Korea) Jung K-e (South Korea) Kim H-n	17	21	21

Second Round
(Germany) I Herttrich (Germany) C Nelte	8	21	14
7	(South Korea) Lee S-h (South Korea) Shin S-c	21	18	21
(England) H Olver (England) K Robertshaw	17	8
2	(South Korea) Jung K-e (South Korea) Kim H-n	21	21

Quarterfinals
7	(South Korea) Lee S-h (South Korea) Shin S-c	21	17	14
2	(South Korea) Jung K-e (South Korea) Kim H-n	19	21	21

== Mixed doubles ==
=== Seeds ===
1. (England) Chris Adcock / Gabrielle Adcock (second round)
2. (Thailand) Sudket Prapakamol / Saralee Thoungthongkam (first round)
3. (South Korea) Ko Sung-hyun / Kim Ha-na (final)
4. (Germany) Michael Fuchs / Birgit Michels (quarter-final)
5. (Hong Kong) Lee Chun Hei / Chau Hoi Wah (quarter-final)
6. (England) Chris Langridge / Heather Olver (first round)
7. (Denmark) Anders Kristiansen / Julie Houmann (second round)
8. (Japan) Kenichi Hayakawa / Misaki Matsutomo (second round)

=== Finals ===
Semifinals
(Scotland) Robert Blair (Scotland) Imogen Bankier	21	21
(Thailand) Maneepong Jongjit (Thailand) Sapsiree Taerattanachai	17	14
3	(South Korea) Ko Sung-hyun (South Korea) Kim Ha-na	21	21
(Poland) Robert Mateusiak (Poland) Agnieszka Wojtkowska	18	17

Final
(Scotland) Robert Blair (Scotland) Imogen Bankier	21	21
3	(South Korea) Ko Sung-hyun (South Korea) Kim Ha-na	15	18

=== Top half ===
==== Section 1 ====
First Round
1	(England) C Adcock (England) G Adcock	11	21	21
(Russia) V Durkin (Russia) N Vislova	21	13	15
(Scotland) R Blair (Scotland) I Bankier	18	21	21
(Indonesia) A Prasetya (Indonesia) A Saufika	21	10	19
7	(Denmark) A Kristiansen (Denmark) J Houmann	21	21
(United States) P Chew (United States) J Subandhi	19	12
(Indonesia) E Subaktiar (Indonesia) G Widjaja	19	17
(Singapore) D Chrisnanta (Singapore) V Neo	21	21

Second Round
1	(England) C Adcock (England) G Adcock	17	21	13
(Scotland) R Blair (Scotland) I Bankier	21	19	21
7	(Denmark) A Kristiansen (Denmark) J Houmann	21	12	19
(Singapore) D Chrisnanta (Singapore) V Neo	16	21	21

Quarterfinals
(Scotland) R Blair (Scotland) I Bankier	21	21
(Singapore) D Chrisnanta (Singapore) V Neo	7	8

==== Section 2 ====
First Round
4	(Germany) M Fuchs (Germany) B Michels	21	22
(South Korea) Shin B-c (South Korea) Eom H-w	10	20
(Thailand) N Puangpuapech (Thailand) P Supajirakul	15	21	21
(Hong Kong) Chan YL (Hong Kong) Tse YS	21	17	19
8	(Japan) K Hayakawa (Japan) M Matsutomo	10	21	21
(Netherlands) J Arends (Netherlands) S Piek	21	15	17
PFQ	(France) R Labar (France) E Lefel	12	17
(Thailand) M Jongjit (Thailand) S Taerattanachai	21	21

Second Round
4	(Germany) M Fuchs (Germany) B Michels	21	21
(Thailand) N Puangpuapech (Thailand) P Supajirakul	16	14
8	(Japan) K Hayakawa (Japan) M Matsutomo	21	18	20
(Thailand) M Jongjit (Thailand) S Taerattanachai	15	21	22

Quarterfinals
4	(Germany) M Fuchs (Germany) B Michels	21	17	18
(Thailand) M Jongjit (Thailand) S Taerattanachai	17	21	21

=== Bottom half ===
==== Section 3 ====
First Round
(Netherlands) J de Ruiter (Netherlands) S Barning	23	18	17
(Sweden) N Ruponen (Sweden) A Hogstrom	21	21	9^{r}
(Republic of Ireland) S Magee (Republic of Ireland) C Magee	23	13	9
5	(Hong Kong) Lee CH (Hong Kong) Chau HW	21	21	21
Q2	(Chinese Taipei) Chen H-l (Chinese Taipei) Cheng W-h	21	21
(Indonesia) I Fadhilah (Indonesia) W Anggraini	17	10
(Malaysia) Chan PS (Malaysia) Lai PJ	12	15
3	(South Korea) Ko S-h (South Korea) Kim H-n	21	21

Second Round
(Netherlands) J de Ruiter (Netherlands) S Barning	21	14	18
5	(Hong Kong) Lee CH (Hong Kong) Chau HW	18	21	21
Q2	(Chinese Taipei) Chen H-l (Chinese Taipei) Cheng W-h	18	23	15
3	(South Korea) Ko S-h (South Korea) Kim H-n	21	21	21

Quarterfinals
5	(Hong Kong) Lee CH (Hong Kong) Chau HW	21	15	27
3	(South Korea) Ko S-h (South Korea) Kim H-n	13	21	29

==== Section 4 ====
First Round
(Germany) P Kaesbauer (Germany) I Herttrich	21	21
Q1	(Russia) A Yartsev (Russia) E Kosetskaya	15	15
(Poland) R Mateusiak (Poland) A Wojtkowska	21	19	21
6	(England) C Langridge (England) H Olver	18	21	12
(Japan) H Hashimoto (Japan) M Maeda	21	17	18
Q3	(Denmark) N Nohr (Denmark) S Thygesen	18	21	21
Q4	(Germany) M Schwenger (Germany) C Nelte	21	18	21
2	(Thailand) S Prapakamol (Thailand) S Thoungthongkam	17	21	17

Second Round
(Germany) P Kaesbauer (Germany) I Herttrich	13	15
(Poland) R Mateusiak (Poland) A Wojtkowska	21	21
Q3	(Denmark) N Nohr (Denmark) S Thygesen	16	17
Q4	(Germany) M Schwenger (Germany) C Nelte	21	21

Quarterfinals
(Poland) R Mateusiak (Poland) A Wojtkowska	17	21	21
Q4	(Germany) M Schwenger (Germany) C Nelte	21	14	12

Preceded by 2014 India Open Grand Prix Gold	BWF Grand Prix Gold and Grand Prix; 2014 season	Succeeded by 2014 Swiss Open Grand Prix Gold
