= Robert Blair (badminton) =

Scottish badminton player (born 1981)

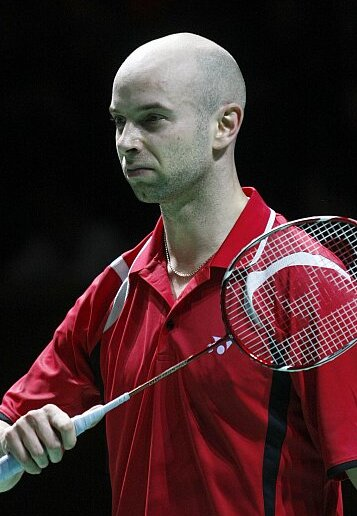
- Blair in 2011

Personal information
- Nationality: British
- Born: 7 August 1981 (age 45) Edinburgh, Scotland
- Height: 6 ft 1 in (185 cm)

Sport
- Sport: Badminton
- Handedness: Right

Mixed & men's doubles
- Highest ranking: 6 (in XD); 4 (in MD)
- BWF profile
Medal record
Men's badminton
Representing Scotland
Commonwealth Games
Bronze medal – third place	2014 Glasgow	Mixed doubles
Representing England
World Championships
Silver medal – second place	2006 Madrid	Men's doubles
Sudirman Cup
Bronze medal – third place	2007 Glasgow	Mixed team
European Mixed Team Championships
Silver medal – second place	2009 Liverpool	Mixed team
European Men's Team Championships
Silver medal – second place	2008 Almere	Men's team
Bronze medal – third place	2006 Thessalonica	Men's team
Commonwealth Games
Silver medal – second place	2006 Melbourne	Mixed team
Bronze medal – third place	2006 Melbourne	Men's doubles

Robert James Blair (born 7 August 1981) is a Scottish born badminton player who represented Scotland and England at international level.

== Biography ==
Blair was born in Scotland, but after attending Loughborough University in Leicestershire, he competed for England from 2001 until 2010, except at the Olympic Games, where Scotland and England are both parts of the Great Britain and Northern Ireland team. His main motivation for changing nation was the prospect of medals at the Commonwealth Games.

Blair competed in badminton at the 2004 Summer Olympics in mixed doubles with partner Natalie Munt. They defeated Tadashi Ohtsuka and Shizuka Yamamoto of Japan in the first round but lost to Nova Widianto and Vita Marissa of Indonesia in the round of 16.

Blair reached the men's doubles final at the 2006 IBF World Championships together with Anthony Clark, losing the final against Cai Yun and Fu Haifeng.

On 16 December 2010 Badminton England and Badminton Scotland announced that Blair would be returning to Scotland. The reason(s) for Blair's return to Scotland remain unclear, but reports suggest a falling-out with members of the Badminton England setup was central to the decision.

== Achievements ==
=== World Championships ===
Men's doubles
Year	Venue	Partner	Opponent	Score	Result
2006	Palacio de Deportes de la Comunidad de Madrid, Madrid, Spain	(England) Anthony Clark	(China) Cai Yun (China) Fu Haifeng	9–21, 13–21	Silver

=== Commonwealth Games ===
Men's doubles
Year	Venue	Partner	Opponent	Score	Result
2006	Melbourne Convention and Exhibition Centre, Melbourne, Australia	(England) Anthony Clark	(Australia) Ashley Brehaut (Australia) Travis Denney	21–6, 21–14	Bronze

Mixed doubles
Year	Venue	Partner	Opponent	Score	Result
2014	Emirates Arena, Glasgow, Scotland	(Scotland) Imogen Bankier	(Malaysia) Chan Peng Soon (Malaysia) Lai Pei Jing	21–17, 21–11	Bronze

=== European Championships ===
Men's doubles
Year	Venue	Partner	Opponent	Score	Result
2006	Maaspoort, Den Bosch, Netherlands	(England) Anthony Clark	(Denmark) Mathias Boe (Denmark) Carsten Mogensen	17–21, 21–11, 18–21	Bronze

=== BWF Grand Prix ===
The BWF Grand Prix had two levels, the Grand Prix and Grand Prix Gold. It was a series of badminton tournaments sanctioned by the Badminton World Federation (BWF) and played between 2007 and 2017. The World Badminton Grand Prix was sanctioned by the International Badminton Federation from 1983 to 2006.

Men's doubles
Year	Tournament	Partner	Opponent	Score	Result
2005	Thessaloniki World Grand Prix	(England) Anthony Clark	(Germany) Michael Fuchs (Germany) Roman Spitko	15–6, 15–9	(gold) Winner
2006	German Open	(England) Anthony Clark	(South Korea) Jung Jae-sung (South Korea) Lee Yong-dae	11–15, 6–15	(silver) Runner-up
2007	Bitburger Open	(England) David Lindley	(Denmark) Mathias Boe (Denmark) Carsten Mogensen	17–21, 15–21	(silver) Runner-up

Mixed doubles
Year	Tournament	Partner	Opponent	Score	Result
2004	Indonesia Open	(England) Natalie Munt	(China) Zhang Jun (China) Gao Ling	9–15, 9–15	(silver) Runner-up
2005	Thessaloniki World Grand Prix	(England) Natalie Munt	(England) Anthony Clark (England) Donna Kellogg	4–15, 15–6, 13–15	(silver) Runner-up
2006	Swiss Open	(England) Natalie Munt	(England) Nathan Robertson (England) Gail Emms	17–14, 7–15, 2–15	(silver) Runner-up
2006	Dutch Open	(England) Jenny Wallwork	(Indonesia) Flandy Limpele (Indonesia) Vita Marissa	21–18, 21–18	(gold) Winner
2007	Bitburger Open	(Scotland) Imogen Bankier	(Germany) Kristof Hopp (Germany) Birgit Overzier	17–21, 17–21	(silver) Runner-up
2010	German Open	(Scotland) Imogen Bankier	(Hong Kong) Yohan Hadikusumo Wiratama (Hong Kong) Tse Ying Suet	5–15 retired	(silver) Runner-up
2011	German Open	(England) Gabrielle White	(Japan) Shintaro Ikeda (Japan) Reiko Shiota	16–21, 21–16, 21–15	(gold) Winner
2013	Scottish Open	(Scotland) Imogen Bankier	(England) Chris Langridge (England) Heather Olver	21–16, 21–14	(gold) Winner
2014	German Open	(Scotland) Imogen Bankier	(South Korea) Ko Sung-hyun (South Korea) Kim Ha-na	21–15, 21–18	(gold) Winner
2014	Scottish Open	(Scotland) Imogen Bankier	(Denmark) Niclas Nøhr (Denmark) Sara Thygesen	21–18, 21–14	(gold) Winner

BWF Grand Prix Gold tournament
BWF Grand Prix tournament

=== BWF International Challenge/Series ===
Men's doubles
Year	Tournament	Partner	Opponent	Score	Result
2000	New Zealand International	(Scotland) Russell Hogg	(New Zealand) John Gordon (New Zealand) Daniel Shirley	16–17, 7–15	(silver) Runner-up
2000	Irish International	(Scotland) Russell Hogg	(Scotland) Alastair Gatt (Scotland) Craig Robertson	15–12, 12–15, 5–15	(silver) Runner-up
2001	Irish International	(England) Stephen Foster	(Canada) Mike Beres (Canada) Kyle Hunter	7–3, 7–3, 6–8, 8–7	(gold) Winner
2002	Austrian International	(England) James Anderson	(England) Peter Jeffrey (England) Ian Palethorpe	7–2, 7–3, 7–5	(gold) Winner
2002	Irish International	(England) Ian Palethorpe	(England) Peter Jeffrey (England) Julian Robertson	15–5, 14–17, 15–9	(gold) Winner
2004	Portugal International	(England) Simon Archer	(Hong Kong) Liu Kwok Wa (Hong Kong) Albertus Susanto Njoto	15–9, 12–15, 15–7	(gold) Winner
2007	Scottish International	(England) David Lindley	(Russia) Vitalij Durkin (Russia) Aleksandr Nikolaenko	21–18, 21–12	(gold) Winner
2012	Bulgarian International	(Malaysia) Tan Bin Shen	(Germany) Andreas Heinz (Germany) Max Schwenger	18–21, 25–23, 21–18	(gold) Winner
2012	Turkey International	(Malaysia) Tan Bin Shen	(Sweden) Magnus Sahlberg (Sweden) Mattias Wigardt	21–11, 21–15	(gold) Winner

Mixed doubles
Year	Tournament	Partner	Opponent	Score	Result
2001	Bulgarian International	(England) Natalie Munt	(England) Paul Trueman (England) Liza Parker	4–7, 4–7, 7–2, –, –	(gold) Winner
2001	Scottish International	(England) Natalie Munt	(Canada) William Milroy (Canada) Denyse Julien	8–6, 7–1, 8–6	(gold) Winner
2001	Irish International	(England) Natalie Munt	(Denmark) Bo Rafn (Denmark) Helle Nielsen	7–4, 3–7, 7–1, 7–5	(gold) Winner
2002	Scottish International	(England) Natalie Munt	(Russia) Nikolai Zuyev (Russia) Marina Yakusheva	6–11, 13–12, 11–9	(gold) Winner
2003	Spanish International	(England) Natalie Munt	(Sweden) Jörgen Olsson (Sweden) Frida Andreasson	17–16, 15–10	(gold) Winner
2007	Scottish International	(Scotland) Imogen Bankier	(Russia) Aleksandr Nikolaenko (Russia) Nina Vislova	15–21, 22–20, 21–9	(gold) Winner
2013	French International	(Scotland) Imogen Bankier	(England) Marcus Ellis (England) Alyssa Lim	21–17, 21–17	(gold) Winner
2013	Kharkiv International	(Scotland) Imogen Bankier	(Denmark) Kim Astrup (Denmark) Maria Helsbøl	20–22, 21–9, 21–18	(gold) Winner
2013	Bulgarian International	(Scotland) Imogen Bankier	(Poland) Robert Mateusiak (Poland) Agnieszka Wojtkowska	21–17, 21–15	(gold) Winner
2013	Irish Open	(Scotland) Imogen Bankier	(Netherlands) Jacco Arends (Netherlands) Selena Piek	21–9, 19–21, 13–21	(silver) Runner-up
2014	Swedish Masters	(Scotland) Imogen Bankier	(Germany) Peter Käsbauer (Germany) Isabel Herttrich	24–22, 14–21, 21–16	(gold) Winner
2014	Orleans International	(Scotland) Imogen Bankier	(Denmark) Niclas Nøhr (Denmark) Sara Thygesen	21–13, 19–21, 21–18	(gold) Winner
2014	Spanish Open	(Scotland) Imogen Bankier	(Poland) Robert Mateusiak (Poland) Agnieszka Wojtkowska	21–13, 14–21, 21–16	(gold) Winner
2015	Swiss International	(Indonesia) Pia Zebadiah Bernadet	(Thailand) Bodin Isara (Thailand) Savitree Amitrapai	18–21, 25–23, 21–18	(gold) Winner

BWF International Challenge tournament
BWF International Series tournament

== Record against selected opponents ==
Mixed Doubles results with Gabrielle White against Super Series finalists, World Championships semifinalists, and Olympic quarterfinalists.

- (China) Tao Jiaming & Tian Qing 0–1
- (China) Xu Chen & Ma Jin 0–3
- (China) Zhang Nan & Zhao Yunlei 0–1
- (Chinese Taipei) Chen Hung-ling & Cheng Wen-hsing 0–1
- (Denmark) Joachim Fischer Nielsen & Christinna Pedersen 0–1
- (Denmark) Thomas Laybourn & Kamilla Rytter Juhl 0–1
- (United Kingdom) Chris Adcock & Imogen Bankier 1–1
- (Indonesia) Tontowi Ahmad & Liliyana Natsir 0–2
- (South Korea) Yoo Yeon-seong & Jang Ye-na 0–1
- (South Korea) Ko Sung-hyun & Yoo Yeon-seong 2–1
- (Poland) Robert Mateusiak & Nadieżda Zięba 0–1
- (Thailand) Songphon Anugritayawon & Kunchala Voravichitchaikul 2–1
- (Thailand) Sudket Prapakamol & Saralee Thungthongkam 1–2
