= 2014 Scottish Open Grand Prix =

Tournament details
- Dates: 19 November 2014– 23 November 2014
- Total prize money: US$50,000
- Venue: Emirates Arena
- Location: Glasgow, Scotland

Champions
- Men's singles: (Finland) Ville Lang
- Women's singles: (Japan) Sayaka Sato
- Men's doubles: (Denmark) Mathias Christiansen (Denmark) David Daugaard
- Women's doubles: (Bulgaria) Gabriela Stoeva (Bulgaria) Stefani Stoeva
- Mixed doubles: (Scotland) Robert Blair (Scotland) Imogen Bankier

The 2014 Scottish Open was the seventeenth grand prix badminton tournament of the 2014 BWF Grand Prix Gold and Grand Prix. The tournament was held in Emirates Arena, Glasgow, Scotland from 19 until 23 November 2014 and had a total purse of $50,000. This tournament supported by the Glasgow City Council, Event Scotland, and Yonex.

== Men's singles ==
=== Seeds ===
1. (Netherlands) Eric Pang (first round)
2. (Sweden) Henri Hurskainen (second round)
3. (Germany) Dieter Domke (withdrew)
4. (Finland) Ville Lang (champion)
5. (Indonesia) Andre Kurniawan Tedjono (third round)
6. (Denmark) Rasmus Fladberg (withdrew)
7. (India) Anand Pawar (semifinals)
8. (Denmark) Joachim Persson (third round)
9. (Denmark) Emil Holst (quarterfinals)
10. (Chinese Taipei) Wang Tzu-wei (final)
11. (Ukraine) Dmytro Zavadsky (semifinals)
12. (France) Lucas Corvee (first round)
13. (Czech Republic) Petr Koukal (quarterfinals)
14. (France) Thomas Rouxel (third round)
15. (Estonia) Raul Must (second round)
16. (Czech Republic) Jan Frohlich (first round)

=== Finals ===
Quarterfinals
11	(Ukraine) Dmytro Zavadsky	21	21
13	(Czech Republic) Petr Koukal	16	16
4	(Finland) Ville Lang	21	21
9	(Denmark) Emil Holst	10	18
7	(India) Anand Pawar	21	14	21
(Belgium) Yuhan Tan	16	21	10
(Denmark) Christian Lind Thomsen	16	21	15
10	(Chinese Taipei) Wang Tzu-wei	21	18	21

Semifinals
11	(Ukraine) Dmytro Zavadsky	21	17	18
4	(Finland) Ville Lang	18	21	21
7	(India) Anand Pawar	23	14
10	(Chinese Taipei) Wang Tzu-wei	25	21

Final
4	(Finland) Ville Lang	17	22	21
10	(Chinese Taipei) Wang Tzu-wei	21	20	16

== Women's singles ==
=== Seeds ===
1. (Scotland) Kirsty Gilmour (semifinals)
2. (Spain) Beatriz Corrales (finals)
3. (Bulgaria) Linda Zetchiri (quarterfinals)
4. (Germany) Karin Schnaase (quarterfinals)
5. (Japan) Kaori Imabeppu (withdrew)
6. (France) Sashina Vignes Waran (withdrew)
7. (Russia) Natalia Perminova (withdrew)
8. (Denmark) Anna Thea Madsen (second round)

=== Finals ===
Semifinals
1	(Scotland) Kirsty Gilmour	21	20	12
(Japan) Sayaka Sato	16	22	21
(India) Saili Rane	13	22
2	(Spain) Beatriz Corrales	21	24

Final
(Japan) Sayaka Sato	21	21
2	(Spain) Beatriz Corrales	18	9

== Men's doubles ==
=== Seeds ===
1. (France) Baptiste Careme / Ronan Labar (second round)
2. (Belgium) Matijs Dierickx / Freek Golinski (second round)
3. (Germany) Max Schwenger / Josche Zurwonne (quarterfinals)
4. (Germany) Raphael Beck / Andreas Heinz (finals)
5. (Canada) Adrian Liu / Derrick Ng (quarterfinals)
6. (Denmark) Mathias Christiansen / David Daugaard (champion)
7. (France) Laurent Constantin / Matthieu Lo Ying Ping (semifinals)
8. (Germany) Fabian Holzer / Mark Lamsfuss (quarterfinals)

=== Finals ===
Semifinals
(England) Matthew Nottingham (England) Harley Towler	15	14
6	(Denmark) Mathias Christiansen (Denmark) David Daugaard	21	21
4	(Germany) Raphael Beck (Germany) Andreas Heinz	21	21
7	(France) Laurent Constantin (France) Matthieu Lo Ying Ping	19	16

Final
6	(Denmark) Mathias Christiansen (Denmark) David Daugaard	21	21
4	(Germany) Raphael Beck (Germany) Andreas Heinz	13	17

== Women's doubles ==
=== Seeds ===
1. (Bulgaria) Gabriela Stoeva / Stefani Stoeva (Champiom)
2. (Germany) Johanna Goliszewski / Carla Nelte (semifinals)
3. (Scotland) Imogen Bankier / Kirsty Gilmour (semifinals)
4. (Canada) Alex Bruce / Phyllis Chan (second round)

=== Finals ===
Semifinals
1	(Bulgaria) Gabriela Stoeva (Bulgaria) Stefani Stoeva	w	/	o
3	(Scotland) Imogen Bankier (Scotland) Kirsty Gilmour
(England) Heather Olver (England) Lauren Smith	21	21
2	(Germany) Johanna Goliszewski (Germany) Carla Nelte	14	18

Final
1	(Bulgaria) Gabriela Stoeva (Bulgaria) Stefani Stoeva	21	21
(England) Heather Olver (England) Lauren Smith	7	15

== Mixed doubles ==
=== Seeds ===
1. (Scotland) Robert Blair / Imogen Bankier (champion)
2. (Germany) Max Schwenger / Carla Nelte (semifinals)
3. (Germany) Peter Kaesbauer / Isabel Herttrich (semifinals)
4. (Denmark) Niclas Nohr / Sara Thygesen (finals)
5. (Canada) Toby Ng / Alex Bruce (quarterfinals)
6. (Sweden) Jonathan Nordh / Emelie Fabbeke (second round)
7. (France) Ronan Labar / Emilie Lefel (quarterfinals)
8. (France) Gaetan Mittelheisser / Audrey Fontaine (quarterfinals)

=== Finals ===
Semifinals
1	(Scotland) Robert Blair (Scotland) Imogen Bankier	17	21	21
3	(Germany) Peter Kaesbauer (Germany) Isabel Herttrich	21	15	14
4	(Denmark) Niclas Nohr (Denmark) Sara Thygesen	21	19	21
2	(Germany) Max Schwenger (Germany) Carla Nelte	16	21	10

Final
1	(Scotland) Robert Blair (Scotland) Imogen Bankier	21	21
4	(Denmark) Niclas Nohr (Denmark) Sara Thygesen	18	14

Preceded by 2014 Korea Open Grand Prix	BWF Grand Prix Gold and Grand Prix; 2014 BWF Season	Succeeded by 2014 Macau Open Grand Prix Gold
