= 2014 Korea Grand Prix =

Tournament details
- Dates: 4–9 November
- Level: Grand Prix
- Total prize money: US$50,000
- Venue: Jeonju Indoor Badminton Court
- Location: Jeonju, South Korea

Champions
- Men's singles: (South Korea) Lee Dong-keun
- Women's singles: (Japan) Nozomi Okuhara
- Men's doubles: (South Korea) Lee Yong-dae (South Korea) Yoo Yeon-seong
- Women's doubles: (South Korea) Lee So-hee (South Korea) Shin Seung-chan
- Mixed doubles: (South Korea) Choi Sol-gyu (South Korea) Shin Seung-chan

The 2014 Korea Grand Prix was the sixteenth badminton tournament of the 2014 BWF Grand Prix Gold and Grand Prix. The tournament was held in Jeonju Indoor Badminton Court, Jeonju, South Korea from 4 until 9 November 2014 and had a total purse of $50,000. This tournament hosted by the Badminton Korea Association, and organized by Jeonbuk National Badminton Association, with the sanctioned from the BWF. The sponsor of this tournament was the Jeollabuk-do, Jeonju city; Ministry of Culture, Sports and Tourism; Korea Sports Council; and the Korea Sports Promotion Foundation. At the end of the tournament, the host country won four from five titles, and also made a record to win the three consecutive doubles events (men's, women's, and mixed) for the eighth consecutive time. The women's singles title goes to a Japanese player.

== Men's singles ==
=== Seeds ===
1. (South Korea) Lee Dong-keun (champion)
2. (Malaysia) Daren Liew (first round)
3. (Japan) Riichi Takeshita (third round)
4. (Malaysia) Mohamad Arif Abdul Latif (third round)
5. (South Korea) Lee Hyun-il (finals)
6. (Chinese Taipei) Wang Tzu-wei (third round)
7. (Japan) Kazumasa Sakai (semifinals)
8. (Malaysia) Iskandar Zulkarnain Zainuddin (quarterfinals)
9. (Chinese Taipei) Shih Kuei-chun (third round)
10. (Malaysia) Goh Soon Huat (third round)
11. (Chinese Taipei) Wan Chia-hsin (third round)
12. (Indonesia) Fikri Ihsandi Hadmadi (second round)
13. (Malaysia) Tan Kian Meng (quarterfinals)
14. (Japan) Kenta Nishimoto (third round)
15. (Malaysia) Ai Wei Jian (first round)
16. (South Korea) Park Sung-min (first round)

=== Finals ===
Quarterfinals
1	(South Korea) Lee Dong-keun	21	21
(South Korea) Kim Dong-hoon	6	15
13	(Malaysia) Tan Kian Meng	12	21	26
7	(Japan) Kazumasa Sakai	21	15	28
5	(South Korea) Lee Hyun-il	21	21
(South Korea) Jeon Hyeok-jin	15	9
8	(Malaysia) Iskandar Zulkarnain Zainuddin	22	20	16
(South Korea) Yim Jong-woo	20	22	21

Semifinals
1	(South Korea) Lee Dong-keun	21	21
7	(Japan) Kazumasa Sakai	10	18
5	(South Korea) Lee Hyun-il	21	21
(South Korea) Yim Jong-woo	13	7

Final
1	(South Korea) Lee Dong-keun	21	24
5	(South Korea) Lee Hyun-il	18	22

== Women's singles ==
=== Seeds ===
1. (Chinese Taipei) Pai Hsiao-ma (first round)
2. (Malaysia) Tee Jing Yi (first round)
3. (Indonesia) Maria Febe Kusumastuti (first round)
4. (Japan) Kaori Imabeppu (quarterfinals)
5. (Japan) Kana Ito (semifinals)
6. (Japan) Nozomi Okuhara (champion)
7. (Japan) Sayaka Sato (finals)
8. (Malaysia) Yang Li Lian (second round)

=== Finals ===
Semifinals
(Japan) Ayumi Mine	13	17
6	(Japan) Nozomi Okuhara	21	21
7	(Japan) Sayaka Sato	19	21	21
5	(Japan) Kana Ito	21	17	17

Final
6	(Japan) Nozomi Okuhara	21	21
7	(Japan) Sayaka Sato	17	13

== Men's doubles ==
=== Seeds ===
1. (South Korea) Lee Yong-dae / Yoo Yeon-seong (champion)
2. (South Korea) Ko Sung-hyun / Shin Baek-choel (finals)
3. (Chinese Taipei) Liao Min-chun / Tseng Min-hao (first round)
4. (Japan) Hiroyuki Saeki / Ryota Taohata (semifinals)
5. (Japan) Kenta Kazuno / Kazushi Yamada (first round)
6. (South Korea) Choi Sol-kyu / Kang Ji-wook (quarterfinals)
7. (South Korea) Kim Dae-sun / Kim Duck-young (first round)
8. (Japan) Takuto Inoue / Yuki Kaneko (quarterfinals)

=== Finals ===
Semifinals
1	(South Korea) Lee Yong-dae (South Korea) Yoo Yeon-seong	21	21
4	(Japan) Hiroyuki Saeki (Japan) Ryota Taohata	17	11
(South Korea) Jun Bong-chan (South Korea) Kim Dae-eun	7	15
2	(South Korea) Ko Sung-hyun (South Korea) Shin Baek-choel	21	21

Final
1	(South Korea) Lee Yong-dae (South Korea) Yoo Yeon-seong	21	21
2	(South Korea) Ko Sung-hyun (South Korea) Shin Baek-choel	18	19

== Women's doubles ==
=== Seeds ===
1. (South Korea) Lee So-hee / Shin Seung-chan (champion)
2. (Indonesia) Suci Rizky Andini / Tiara Rosalia Nuraidah (first round)
3. (Malaysia) Amelia Alicia Anscelly / Soong Fie Cho (first round)
4. (Japan) Yuki Fukushima / Sayaka Hirota (quarterfinals)
5. (South Korea) Chang Ye-na / Yoo Hae-won (finals)
6. (South Korea) Go Ah-ra / Kim So-yeong (semifinals)
7. (South Korea) Choi Hye-in / Kim Ha-na (first round)
8. (South Korea) Eom Hye-won / Jung Kyung-eun (quarterfinals)

=== Finals ===
Semifinals
1	(South Korea) Lee So-hee (South Korea) Shin Seung-chan	21	21
(Malaysia) Vivian Kah Mun Hoo (Malaysia) Ng Hui Lin	14	14
5	(South Korea) Chang Ye-na (South Korea) Yoo Hae-won	21	21
5	(South Korea) Go Ah-ra (South Korea) Kim So-yeong	14	15

Final
1	(South Korea) Lee So-hee (South Korea) Shin Seung-chan	15
5	(South Korea) Chang Ye-na (South Korea) Yoo Hae-won	8^{r}

== Mixed doubles ==
=== Seeds ===
1. (South Korea) Ko Sung-hyun / Kim Ha-na (first round)
2. (Malaysia) Tan Aik Quan / Lai Pei Jing (second round)
3. (Chinese Taipei) Liao Min-chun / Chen Hsiao-huan (second round)
4. (Malaysia) Wong Fai Yin / Chow Mei Kuan (quarterfinals)
5. (South Korea) Shin Baek-choel / Chang Ye-na (finals)
6. (South Korea) Choi Sol-gyu / Shin Seung-chan (champion)
7. (Malaysia) Chan Peng Soon / Ng Hui Lin (second round)
8. (Malaysia) Ong Jian Guo / Lee Meng Yean (withdrew)

=== Finals ===
Semifinals
(Chinese Taipei) Tseng Min-hao (Chinese Taipei) Lai Chia-wen	18	21	18
6	(South Korea) Choi Sol-gyu (South Korea) Shin Seung-chan	21	19	21
(South Korea) Yoo Yeon-seong (South Korea) Eom Hye-won	20	18
5	(South Korea) Shin Baek-choel (South Korea) Chang Ye-na	22	21

Final
6	(South Korea) Choi Sol-gyu (South Korea) Shin Seung-chan	w	/	o
5	(South Korea) Shin Baek-choel (South Korea) Chang Ye-na

Preceded by 2014 Bitburger Open Grand Prix Gold	BWF Grand Prix Gold and Grand Prix; 2014 BWF Season	Succeeded by 2014 Scottish Open Grand Prix
