= 2014 Macau Open Grand Prix Gold =

2014 Macau Grand Prix Gold
Tournament details
- Dates: November 25, 2014 - November 30, 2014
- Total prize money: US$120,000
- Venue: Tap Seac Multi-sports Pavilion
- Location: Macau

Champions
- Men's singles: (China) Xue Song
- Women's singles: (India) P. V. Sindhu
- Men's doubles: (Singapore) Danny Bawa Chrisnanta (Singapore) Chayut Triyachart
- Women's doubles: (China) Ou Dongni (China) Yu Xiaohan
- Mixed doubles: (Indonesia) Edi Subaktiar (Indonesia) Gloria Emanuelle Widjaja

The 2014 Macau Open Grand Prix Open was the eighteenth tournament of the 2014 BWF Grand Prix Gold and Grand Prix circuit. The tournament was held in Tap Seac Multi-sports Pavilion, Macau November 25–30, 2014 and had a total purse of $120,000.

== Players by nation ==
Nation	First Round	Second Round	Third Round	Quarterfinals	Semifinals	Final
(Chinese Taipei)	24	11	2	3	1	
(Malaysia)	17	4	1		1	
(Indonesia)	8	8	1	4	1	1
(South Korea)	8	6	1	2	2	1
(China)	7	6	1	2	2	1
(Hong Kong)	6	3				1
(Thailand)	5	4		1	2	
(India)	4	1	1		1	1
(Singapore)	3	1		1		1
(Canada)	2			1		
(Russia)	1			1		
(Italy)	1					
(Austria)	1					
(Poland)	1					
(England)		1		3		
(United States)		1		1		
(Australia)		1		1		
(Netherlands)		1				
(Macau)		1				
(Germany)				1		

== Men's singles ==
=== Seeds ===
1. (India) Srikanth Kidambi (withdrew)
2. (Germany) Marc Zwiebler (quarter-finals)
3. (India) Prannoy H. S. (semi-finals)
4. (Chinese Taipei) Hsu Jen-hao (third round)
5. (England) Rajiv Ouseph (quarter-finals)
6. (Hong Kong) Wong Wing Ki (final)
7. (India) Sourabh Verma (second round)
8. (India) B. Sai Praneeth (third round)
9. (China) Gao Huan (third round)
10. (Russia) Vladimir Malkov (first round)
11. (China) Xue Song (champion)
12. (Malaysia) Mohamad Arif Abdul Latif (second round)
13. (Indonesia) Sony Dwi Kuncoro (quarter-finals)
14. (India) Ajay Jayaram (first round)
15. (Malaysia) Tan Chun Seang (first round)
16. (Malaysia) Zulfadli Zulkiffli (third round)

=== Finals ===
Quarterfinals
(South Korea) Kim Dong-hoon	21	21
(Thailand) Suppanyu Avihingsanon	17	17
11	(China) Xue Song	21	21
5	(England) Rajiv Ouseph	19	19
13	(Indonesia) Sony Dwi Kuncoro	19	17
3	(India) Prannoy H. S.	21	21
6	(Hong Kong) Wong Wing Ki	23	21
2	(Germany) Marc Zwiebler	21	13

Semifinals
(South Korea) Kim Dong-hoon	17	12
11	(China) Xue Song	21	21
3	(India) Prannoy H. S.	16	21	12
6	(Hong Kong) Wong Wing Ki	21	16	21

Final
11	(China) Xue Song	16	21	21
6	(Hong Kong) Wong Wing Ki	21	13	19

=== Top half ===
==== Section 1 ====
First Round
PFQ	(Malaysia) Tan JY	17	21	21
Q6	(Malaysia) Yeoh KE	21	18	14
(Chinese Taipei) Lin C-h	15	9
(South Korea) Kim D-h	21	21
14	(India) A Jayaram	15	11
(Japan) K Sakai	21	21
(South Korea) Jeon H-j	21	21
(Singapore) S Lee	17	9

Second Round
PFQ	(Malaysia) Tan JY	11	10
(South Korea) Kim D-h	21	21
(Japan) K Sakai	21	21
(South Korea) Jeon H-j	19	18

Third Round
(South Korea) Kim D-h	21	21
(Japan) K Sakai	18	18

==== Section 2 ====
First Round
7	(India) S Varma	21	21
(Chinese Taipei) Yang C-c	14	15
(Thailand) S Avihingsanon	21	21
(Chinese Taipei) Chu H-c	16	10
16	(Malaysia) Zf Zulkiffli	21	21
Q3	(Malaysia) Zh Zulkiffli	17	10
(Malaysia) Ai WJ	15	12
(Chinese Taipei) Wan C-h	21	21

Second Round
7	(India) S Varma	21	17	20
(Thailand) S Avihingsanon	17	21	22
16	(Malaysia) Zf Zulkiffli	21	5	21
(Chinese Taipei) Wan C-h	11	21	12

Third Round
(Thailand) S Avihingsanon	13	21	21
16	(Malaysia) Zf Zulkiffli	21	18	15

==== Section 3 ====
First Round
4	(Chinese Taipei) Hsu J-h	21	21
Q4	(Malaysia) J Tay	14	12
(India) A Bhat	15	5
Q5	(China) Shi YQ	21	21
11	(China) Xue S	21	21
(Indonesia) N Sulistyo	14	7
Q7	(China) Lin GP	19	18
(Indonesia) E Sukamta	21	21

Second Round
4	(Chinese Taipei) Hsu J-h	23	13	21
Q5	(China) Shi YQ	21	21	13
11	(China) Xue S	21	21
(Indonesia) E Sukamta	19	10

Third Round
4	(Chinese Taipei) Hsu J-h	15	19
11	(China) Xue S	21	21

==== Section 4 ====
First Round
5	(England) R Ouseph	21	21
(Malaysia) Kuan BH	8	8
(Malaysia) Chong YH	20	18
Q8	(Chinese Taipei) Lo C-y	22	21
12	(Malaysia) A Abdul Latif	17	26	21
(Indonesia) FA Kholik	21	24	11
(South Korea) Heo K-h	24	21
(Hong Kong) Tam CH	22	11

Second Round
5	(England) R Ouseph	21	21
Q8	(Chinese Taipei) Lo C-y	9	15
12	(Malaysia) A Abdul Latif	18	17
(South Korea) Heo K-h	21	21

Third Round
5	(England) R Ouseph	21	21
(South Korea) Heo K-h	17	15

=== Bottom half ===
==== Section 5 ====
First Round
(South Korea) Park S-m	16	21	13
(Thailand) K Phetpradab	21	18	21
(Japan) K Nishimoto	8	23
13	(Indonesia) S Kuncoro	21	25
Q1	(Singapore) R Susilo	21	21
(Chinese Taipei) Kuo P-c	15	7
(Malaysia) Woon KH	5^{r}
8	(India) S Praneeth	11

Second Round
(Thailand) K Phetpradab	16	13
13	(Indonesia) S Kuncoro	21	21
Q1	(Singapore) R Susilo	15	18
8	(India) S Praneeth	21	21

Third Round
13	(Indonesia) S Kuncoro	21	19	21
8	(India) S Praneeth	16	21	17

==== Section 6 ====
First Round
(Chinese Taipei) Lin Y-h	21	21
(Malaysia) Lim FY	9	11
(Malaysia) Soo TZ	10	21	21
10	(Russia) V Ivanov	21	10	14
(Indonesia) A Marteen	21	21
Q2	(Indonesia) R Ismanto	12	17
(Chinese Taipei) Shih K-c	12	18
3	(India) P Kumar	21	21

Second Round
(Chinese Taipei) Lin Y-h	18	21	21
(Malaysia) Soo TZ	21	18	11
(Indonesia) A Marteen	18	16
3	(India) P Kumar	21	21

Third Round
(Chinese Taipei) Lin Y-h	21	19	14
3	(India) P Kumar	17	21	21

==== Section 7 ====
First Round
(Indonesia) V Anindita	13	5
(Chinese Taipei) Hsueh H-y	21	21
(Thailand) P Thongnuam	11	7
9	(China) Gao H	21	21
(Malaysia) Loke KP	17	17
(Chinese Taipei) Lu C-h	21	21
(Indonesia) R Subagja	11	21	11
6	(Hong Kong) Wong WK	21	17	21

Second Round
(Chinese Taipei) Hsueh H-y	17	18
9	(China) Gao H	21	21
(Chinese Taipei) Lu C-h	14	13
6	(Hong Kong) Wong WK	21	21

Third Round
9	(China) Gao H	21	15	21
6	(Hong Kong) Wong WK	19	21	23

==== Section 8 ====
First Round
PFQ	(South Korea) Lee H-j	21	21
(Canada) T Chiu	12	10
(Indonesia) F Hadmadi	20	11
15	(Malaysia) Tan CS	22	5^{r}
(Indonesia) K Alexander	21	15	17
(England) A Smith	12	21	21
(Singapore) Huang C	21	14	13
2	(Germany) M Zwiebler	14	21	21

Second Round
PFQ	(South Korea) Lee H-j	21	18	20
(Indonesia) F Hadmadi	17	21	22
(England) A Smith	15	16
2	(Germany) M Zwiebler	21	21

Third Round
(Indonesia) F Hadmadi	11	12
2	(Germany) M Zwiebler	21	21

== Women's singles ==
=== Seeds ===
1. (Spain) Carolina Marín (withdrew)
2. (India) P. V. Sindhu (champion)
3. (Canada) Michelle Li (quarter-finals)
4. (United States) Beiwen Zhang (quarter-finals)
5. (China) Han Li (quarter-finals)
6. (Thailand) Nitchaon Jindapol (second round)
7. (China) Sun Yu (semi-finals)
8. (Thailand) Busanan Ongbamrungphan (semi-finals)

=== Finals ===
Semifinals
7	(China) Sun Yu	21	22	10
(South Korea) Kim Hyo-min	15	24	21
8	(Thailand) Busanan Ongbamrungphan	14	15
2	(India) P. V. Sindhu	21	21

Final
(South Korea) Kim Hyo-min	12	17
2	(India) P. V. Sindhu	21	21

=== Top half ===
==== Section 1 ====
First Round
PFQ	(South Korea) Koh E-b	15	14
(Indonesia) A Firdasari	21	21
(China) Yao X	21	21
(Chinese Taipei) Cheng C-y	10	19
7	(China) Sun Y	21	21
(Indonesia) M Wiranto	11	12
Q2	(South Korea) Lee M-j	21	15	21
(Chinese Taipei) Chiang M-h	14	21	23

Second Round
(Indonesia) A Firdasari	21	21
(China) Yao X	15	14
7	(China) Sun Y	21	21
(Chinese Taipei) Chiang M-h	8	15

Quarterfinals
(Indonesia) A Firdasari	12	20
7	(China) Sun Y	21	22

==== Section 2 ====
First Round
4	(United States) B Zhang	21	21
(Malaysia) Lim YF	11	16
(India) P Thulasi	12	17
(Chinese Taipei) Hsu Y-c	21	21
6	(Thailand) N Jindapol	21	21
(Italy) J Cicognini	18	10
(South Korea) Kim H-m	21	21
(Hong Kong) Cheung N Y	15	12

Second Round
4	(United States) B Zhang	w	/	o
(Chinese Taipei) Hsu Y-c
6	(Thailand) N Jindapol	14	13
(South Korea) Kim H-m	21	21

Quarterfinals
4	(United States) B Zhang	21	21	13
(South Korea) Kim H-m	23	17	21

=== Bottom half ===
==== Section 3 ====
First Round
(Malaysia) Yang L L	21	23
(Thailand) P Chochuwong	17	21
Q1	(China) Chen YF	21	16	13
8	(Thailand) B Ongbamrungphan	15	21	21
(United States) I Wang	21	21
Q3	(South Korea) Lee J-m	18	11
(Chinese Taipei) Pai H-m	21	15	11
3	(Canada) M Li	19	21	21

Second Round
(Malaysia) Yang L L	5	6
8	(Thailand) B Ongbamrungphan	21	21
(United States) I Wang	21	13	14
3	(Canada) M Li	15	21	21

Quarterfinals
8	(Thailand) B Ongbamrungphan	21	21
3	(Canada) M Li	11	14

==== Section 4 ====
First Round
(Austria) S Prutsch	10	9
(Chinese Taipei) Pai Y-p	21	21
Q4	(China) He BJ	24	13	10
5	(China) Han L	22	21	21
(Indonesia) L Fanetri	21	21
(Malaysia) L Cheah	14	8
(Chinese Taipei) Hung S-h	19	15
2	(India) P. V. Sindhu	21	21

Second Round
(Chinese Taipei) Pai Y-p	12	13
5	(China) Han L	21	21
(Indonesia) L Fanetri	16	21	19
2	(India) P. V. Sindhu	21	16	21

Quarterfinals
5	(China) Han L	17	21	16
2	(India) P. V. Sindhu	21	19	21

== Men's doubles ==
=== Seeds ===
1. (China) Li Junhui / Liu Yuchen (first round)
2. (Singapore) Danny Bawa Chrisnanta / Chayut Triyachart (champion)
3. (Poland) Łukasz Moren / Wojciech Skudlarczyk (first round)
4. (Indonesia) Wahyu Nayaka / Ade Yusuf (semi-final)
5. (China) Wang Yilu / Zhang Wen (quarter-final)
6. (Indonesia) Berry Angriawan / Rian Agung Saputro (second round)
7. (Indonesia) Angga Pratama / Ricky Karanda Suwardi (final)
8. (Indonesia) Fran Kurniawan / Agripinna Prima Rahmanto Putra (first round)

=== Finals ===
Semifinals
(Chinese Taipei) Chen Hung-ling (Chinese Taipei) Wang Chi-lin	21	16	19
7	(Indonesia) Angga Pratama (Indonesia) Ricky Karanda Suwardi	19	21	21
4	(Indonesia) Wahyu Nayaka (Indonesia) Ade Yusuf	21	17	19
2	(Singapore) Danny Bawa Chrisnanta (Singapore) Chayut Triyachart	18	21	21

Final
7	(Indonesia) Angga Pratama (Indonesia) Ricky Karanda Suwardi	19	20
2	(Singapore) Danny Bawa Chrisnanta (Singapore) Chayut Triyachart	21	22

=== Top half ===
==== Section 1 ====
First Round
1	(China) Li JH (China) Liu YC	16	21	12
(Chinese Taipei) Chen H-l (Chinese Taipei) Wang C-l	21	14	21
(Indonesia) R Alexander (Indonesia) E Subaktiar	17	10
(Chinese Taipei) Hung Y-y (Chinese Taipei) Su C-h	21	21
6	(Indonesia) B Angriawan (Indonesia) R Saputro	13	21	23
(Chinese Taipei) Liao M-c (Chinese Taipei) Tseng M-h	21	19	21
Q2	(Malaysia) Chooi KM (Malaysia) Teo KS	17	19
(England) M Ellis (England) C Langridge	21	21

Second Round
(Chinese Taipei) Chen H-l (Chinese Taipei) Wang C-l	21	21
(Chinese Taipei) Hung Y-y (Chinese Taipei) Su C-h	15	14
6	(Indonesia) B Angriawan (Indonesia) R Saputro	16	21
(England) M Ellis (England) C Langridge	21	23

Quarterfinals
(Chinese Taipei) Chen H-l (Chinese Taipei) Wang C-l	21	21
(England) M Ellis (England) C Langridge	12	16

==== Section 2 ====
First Round
3	(Poland) Ł Moren (Poland) W Skudlarczyk	21	18	17
(Chinese Taipei) Liang J-w (Chinese Taipei) Lu C-b	19	21	21
PFQ	(South Korea) Jun B-c (South Korea) Kim D-e	24	21
(South Korea) Kim D-s (South Korea) Kim D-y	22	15
7	(Indonesia) A Pratama (Indonesia) R Suwardi	21	21
(Malaysia) Lim KW (Malaysia) Ow YH	16	18
(Netherlands) R Bosch (Chinese Taipei) Tien T-c	21	22
(Thailand) W Buranakuea (Thailand) T Potieng	19	20

Second Round
(Chinese Taipei) Liang J-w (Chinese Taipei) Lu C-b	21	10	21
PFQ	(South Korea) Jun B-c (South Korea) Kim D-e	15	21	17
7	(Indonesia) A Pratama (Indonesia) R Suwardi	21	21
(Netherlands) R Bosch (Chinese Taipei) Tien T-c	12	16

Quarterfinals
(Chinese Taipei) Liang J-w (Chinese Taipei) Lu C-b	19	12
7	(Indonesia) A Pratama (Indonesia) R Suwardi	21	21

=== Bottom half ===
==== Section 3 ====
First Round
(Indonesia) C Rusdianto (Indonesia) T Wardhana	23	15	22
(England) A Ellis (England) P Mills	21	21	24
(Chinese Taipei) Lin C-y (Chinese Taipei) Wu H-l	21	18	21
8	(Indonesia) F Kurniawan (Indonesia) A Putra	14	21	17
(India) P Chopra (India) A Dewalkar	21	13	14
(South Korea) Choi S-k (South Korea) Kang J-w	17	21	21
PFQ	(Chinese Taipei) Liu W-c (Chinese Taipei) Yang P-h	18	12
4	(Indonesia) W Nayaka (Indonesia) A Yusuf	21	21

Second Round
(England) A Ellis (England) P Mills	21	23
(Chinese Taipei) Lin C-y (Chinese Taipei) Wu H-l	18	21
(South Korea) Choi S-k (South Korea) Kang J-w	15	17
4	(Indonesia) W Nayaka (Indonesia) A Yusuf	21	21

Quarterfinals
(England) A Ellis (England) P Mills	15	19
4	(Indonesia) W Nayaka (Indonesia) A Yusuf	21	21

==== Section 4 ====
First Round
Q3	(Thailand) S Anugritayawon (Thailand) P Vilailak	17	21	21
Q4	(Hong Kong) F Kurniawan (Hong Kong) Lo LK	21	17	11
Q1	(Thailand) K Ketlen (Thailand) D Puavaranukroh	21	5	13
5	(China) Wang YL (China) Zhang W	17	21	21
(China) Huang KX (China) Zheng SW	21	21
(Chinese Taipei) Huang P-j (Chinese Taipei) Lu C-y	16	14
(Chinese Taipei) Chang K-l (Chinese Taipei) Su Y-n	16	21	17
2	(Singapore) D Chrisnanta (Singapore) C Triyachart	21	12	21

Second Round
Q3	(Thailand) S Anugritayawon (Thailand) P Vilailak	17	21	17
5	(China) Wang YL (China) Zhang W	21	13	21
(China) Huang KX (China) Zheng SW	21	12	14
2	(Singapore) D Chrisnanta (Singapore) C Triyachart	17	21	21

Quarterfinals
5	(China) Wang YL (China) Zhang W	20	18
2	(Singapore) D Chrisnanta (Singapore) C Triyachart	22	21

== Women's doubles ==
=== Seeds ===
1. (China) Luo Ying / Luo Yu (first round)
2. (Thailand) Duanganong Aroonkesorn / Kunchala Voravichitchaikul (semi-final)
3. (Malaysia) Vivian Hoo Kah Mun / Woon Khe Wei (semi-final)
4. (Indonesia) Suci Rizki Andini / Tiara Rosalia Nuraidah (quarter-final)
5. (Indonesia) Keshya Nurvita Hanadia / Devi Tika Permatasari (quarter-final)
6. (China) Huang Yaqiong / Zhong Qianxin (final)
7. (South Korea) Choi Hye-in / Ko A-ra (quarter-final)
8. (Hong Kong) Chan Tsz Ka / Tse Ying Suet (first round)

=== Finals ===
Semifinals
Q3	(China) Ou Dongni (China) Yu Xiaohan	24	21
3	(Malaysia) Vivian Hoo Kah Mun (Malaysia) Woon Khe Wei	22	19
6	(China) Huang Yaqiong (China) Zhong Qianxin	21	21
2	(Thailand) Duanganong Aroonkesorn (Thailand) Kunchala Voravichitchaikul	19	14

Final
Q3	(China) Ou Dongni (China) Yu Xiaohan	19	21	21
6	(China) Huang Yaqiong (China) Zhong Qianxin	21	19	7

=== Top half ===
==== Section 1 ====
First Round
1	(China) Luo Y (China) Luo Y	16	22
Q3	(China) Ou DN (China) Yu XH	21	24
Q4	(Chinese Taipei) Chen S-y (Chinese Taipei) Cheng Y-c	22	21	17
(Thailand) P Muenwong (Thailand) K Ostermeyer	24	19	21
8	(Hong Kong) Chan TK (Hong Kong) Tse YS	17	21
(South Korea) Chae Y-j (South Korea) Kim J-w	21	23
(South Korea) Eom H-w (South Korea) Yoo H-w	21	21
(Thailand) J Kittiharakul (Thailand) R Prajongjai	18	17

Second Round
Q3	(China) Ou DN (China) Yu XH	21	21
(Thailand) P Muenwong (Thailand) K Ostermeyer	19	13
(South Korea) Chae Y-j (South Korea) Kim J-w	21	13
(South Korea) Eom H-w (South Korea) Yoo H-w	23	21

Quarterfinals
Q3	(China) Ou DN (China) Yu XH	21	21
(South Korea) Eom H-w (South Korea) Yoo H-w	12	5

==== Section 2 ====
First Round
3	(Malaysia) V Hoo (Malaysia) Woon KW	21	21
(Chinese Taipei) Chiang K-h (Chinese Taipei) Wu F-c	16	16
(Indonesia) D Haris (Indonesia) G Imawan	21	21
(Thailand) P Chochuwong (Thailand) C Teachavorasinskun	11	15
5	(Indonesia) K Hanadia (Indonesia) D Permatasari
(Chinese Taipei) Hsu Y-c (Chinese Taipei) Pai Y-p	wo
(Thailand) C Chaladchalam (Thailand) N Saengchote	21	15	16
(Macau) Wang R (Macau) Zhang ZB	16	21	21

Second Round
3	(Malaysia) V Hoo (Malaysia) Woon KW	21	21
(Indonesia) D Haris (Indonesia) G Imawan	16	18
5	(Indonesia) K Hanadia (Indonesia) D Permatasari	21	21
(Macau) Wang R (Macau) Zhang ZB	15	14

Quarterfinals
3	(Malaysia) V Hoo (Malaysia) Woon KW	21	21
5	(Indonesia) K Hanadia (Indonesia) D Permatasari	8	16

=== Bottom half ===
==== Section 3 ====
First Round
BYE
PFQ	(Hong Kong) Ng WY (Hong Kong) Shek HY
(Singapore) V Neo (Singapore) S Sari	15	19
6	(China) Huang YQ (China) Zhong QX	21	21
(Hong Kong) Chan HY (Hong Kong) Yuen SY	22	14	11
(Indonesia) A Awanda (Indonesia) K Istirani	20	21	21
(Chinese Taipei) Kuo Y-w (Chinese Taipei) Lin T-y	8	18
4	(Indonesia) S Andini (Indonesia) T Nuraidah	21	21

Second Round
PFQ	(Hong Kong) Ng WY (Hong Kong) Shek HY	13	9
6	(China) Huang YQ (China) Zhong QX	21	21
(Indonesia) A Awanda (Indonesia) K Istirani	17	19
4	(Indonesia) S Andini (Indonesia) T Nuraidah	21	21

Quarterfinals
6	(China) Huang YQ (China) Zhong QX	21	21
4	(Indonesia) S Andini (Indonesia) T Nuraidah	15	11

==== Section 4 ====
First Round
(Malaysia) Lee MY (Malaysia) Lim YL	17	11
(Chinese Taipei) Cheng C-y (Chinese Taipei) Pai H-m	21	21
(Chinese Taipei) Hsieh P-c (Chinese Taipei) Wu T-j	17	17
7	(South Korea) Choi H-i (South Korea) Go A-r	21	21
(China) Huang DP (China) Zhu MC	16	16
(Chinese Taipei) Chen H-h (Chinese Taipei) Lai C-w	21	21
Q2	(Australia) W Chen (Chinese Taipei) Shuai P-l	14	10
2	(Thailand) D Aroonkesorn (Thailand) K Voravichitchaikul	21	21

Second Round
(Chinese Taipei) Cheng C-y (Chinese Taipei) Pai H-m	10	21	14
7	(South Korea) Choi H-i (South Korea) Go A-r	21	14	21
(Chinese Taipei) Chen H-h (Chinese Taipei) Lai C-w	22	18
2	(Thailand) D Aroonkesorn (Thailand) K Voravichitchaikul	24	21

Quarterfinals
7	(South Korea) Choi H-i (South Korea) Go A-r	18	19
2	(Thailand) D Aroonkesorn (Thailand) K Voravichitchaikul	21	21

== Mixed doubles ==
=== Seeds ===
1. (China) Lu Kai / Huang Yaqiong (first round)
2. (Indonesia) Praveen Jordan / Debby Susanto (withdrew)
3. (Singapore) Danny Bawa Chrisnanta / Vanessa Neo Yu Yan (final)
4. (Hong Kong) Chan Yun Lung / Tse Ying Suet (second round)
5. (China) Huang Kaixiang / Huang Dongping (semi-final)
6. (Indonesia) Ronald Alexander / Melati Daeva Oktaviani (second round)
7. (Indonesia) Edi Subaktiar / Gloria Emanuelle Widjaja (champion)
8. (India) Akshay Dewalkar / Pradnya Gadre (withdrew)

=== Finals ===
Semifinals
(South Korea) Kim Duck-young (South Korea) Go Ah-ra	19	21	17
3	(Singapore) Danny Bawa Chrisnanta (Singapore) Vanessa Neo Yu Yan	21	11	21
5	(China) Huang Kaixiang (China) Huang Dongping	15	21	20
7	(Indonesia) Edi Subaktiar (Indonesia) Gloria Emanuelle Widjaja	21	18	22

Final
3	(Singapore) Danny Bawa Chrisnanta (Singapore) Vanessa Neo Yu Yan	15	30	20
7	(Indonesia) Edi Subaktiar (Indonesia) Gloria Emanuelle Widjaja	21	29	22

=== Top half ===
==== Section 1 ====
First Round
1	(China) Lu K (China) Huang YQ	20	21	19
(Indonesia) I Fadhilah (Indonesia) W Anggraini	22	10	21
Q3	(Chinese Taipei) Wang C-l (Chinese Taipei) Cheng C-y	21	23
(Malaysia) L Abdul Khalid (Malaysia) Soong FC	17	21
6	(Indonesia) R Alexander (Indonesia) M Oktaviani	21	21	21
(Hong Kong) Wong WH (Hong Kong) Chan HY	23	12	18
(South Korea) Kim D-y (South Korea) Go A-r	21	18	21
Q2	(South Korea) Kim D-e (South Korea) Choi H-i	15	21	19

Second Round
(Indonesia) I Fadhilah (Indonesia) W Anggraini	16	7
Q3	(Chinese Taipei) Wang C-l (Chinese Taipei) Cheng C-y	21	21
6	(Indonesia) R Alexander (Indonesia) M Oktaviani	21	26	18
(South Korea) Kim D-y (South Korea) Go A-r	16	28	21

Quarterfinals
Q3	(Chinese Taipei) Wang C-l (Chinese Taipei) Cheng C-y	17	17
(South Korea) Kim D-y (South Korea) Go A-r	21	21

==== Section 2 ====
First Round
3	(Singapore) D Chrisnanta (Singapore) V Neo	17	21	21
(South Korea) Bae K-y (South Korea) Kim J-w	21	11	16
(South Korea) Choi S-k (South Korea) Yoo H-w	21	21
(Chinese Taipei) Tseng M-h (Chinese Taipei) Lai C-w	10	18
PFQ	(Chinese Taipei) Su C-h (Chinese Taipei) Hung S-h	17	14
(China) Zhang W (China) Zhu MC	21	21
(Chinese Taipei) Chen C-j (Chinese Taipei) Cheng Y-c	13	9
PFQ	(Singapore) C Triyachart (Singapore) S Sari	21	21

Second Round
3	(Singapore) D Chrisnanta (Singapore) V Neo	21	21
(South Korea) Choi S-k (South Korea) Yoo H-w	5	16
(China) Zhang W (China) Zhu MC	15	17
PFQ	(Singapore) C Triyachart (Singapore) S Sari	21	21

Quarterfinals
3	(Singapore) D Chrisnanta (Singapore) V Neo	21	21
PFQ	(Singapore) C Triyachart (Singapore) S Sari	19	18

=== Bottom half ===
==== Section 3 ====
First Round
(China) Wang YL (China) Ou DN	21	21
(South Korea) Kang J-w (South Korea) Eom H-w	18	16
(Hong Kong) Law CH (Hong Kong) Ng WY	15	16
5	(China) Huang KX (China) Huang DP	21	21
(Russia) E Dremin (Russia) E Dimova	21	21
Q1	(Chinese Taipei) Hung Y-y (Chinese Taipei) Chiang K-h	11	11
(Thailand) S Anugritayawon (Thailand) K Voravichitchaikul	11	14
4	(Hong Kong) Chan YL (Hong Kong) Tse YS	21	21

Second Round
(China) Wang YL (China) Ou DN	18	18
5	(China) Huang KX (China) Huang DP	21	21
(Russia) E Dremin (Russia) E Dimova	21	12	21
4	(Hong Kong) Chan YL (Hong Kong) Tse YS	13	21	17

Quarterfinals
5	(China) Huang KX (China) Huang DP	21	21
(Russia) E Dremin (Russia) E Dimova	19	19

==== Section 4 ====
First Round
(Hong Kong) Tang CM (Hong Kong) Chan TK	21	21
(Canada) H Wiebe (Canada) G Gao	15	16
(Malaysia) Wong FY (Malaysia) Chow MK	10	15
7	(Indonesia) E Subaktiar (Indonesia) G Widjaja	21	21
(China) Liu YC (China) Yu XH	21	18	21
(Chinese Taipei) Liao M-c (Chinese Taipei) Chen H-h	19	21	16
Q4	(Chinese Taipei) Lu C-y (Australia) W Chen	21	21
PFQ	(Chinese Taipei) Lu C-b (Chinese Taipei) Chen S-y	19	14

Second Round
(Hong Kong) Tang CM (Hong Kong) Chan TK	19	17
7	(Indonesia) E Subaktiar (Indonesia) G Widjaja	21	21
(China) Liu YC (China) Yu XH	18	18
Q4	(Chinese Taipei) Lu C-y (Australia) W Chen	21	21

Quarterfinals
7	(Indonesia) E Subaktiar (Indonesia) G Widjaja	21	21
Q4	(Chinese Taipei) Lu C-y (Australia) W Chen	18	19

Preceded by 2014 Scottish Open Grand Prix	BWF Grand Prix Gold and Grand Prix; 2014 season	Succeeded by 2014 US Open Grand Prix
