= Chang Ye-na =

South Korean badminton player (born 1989)

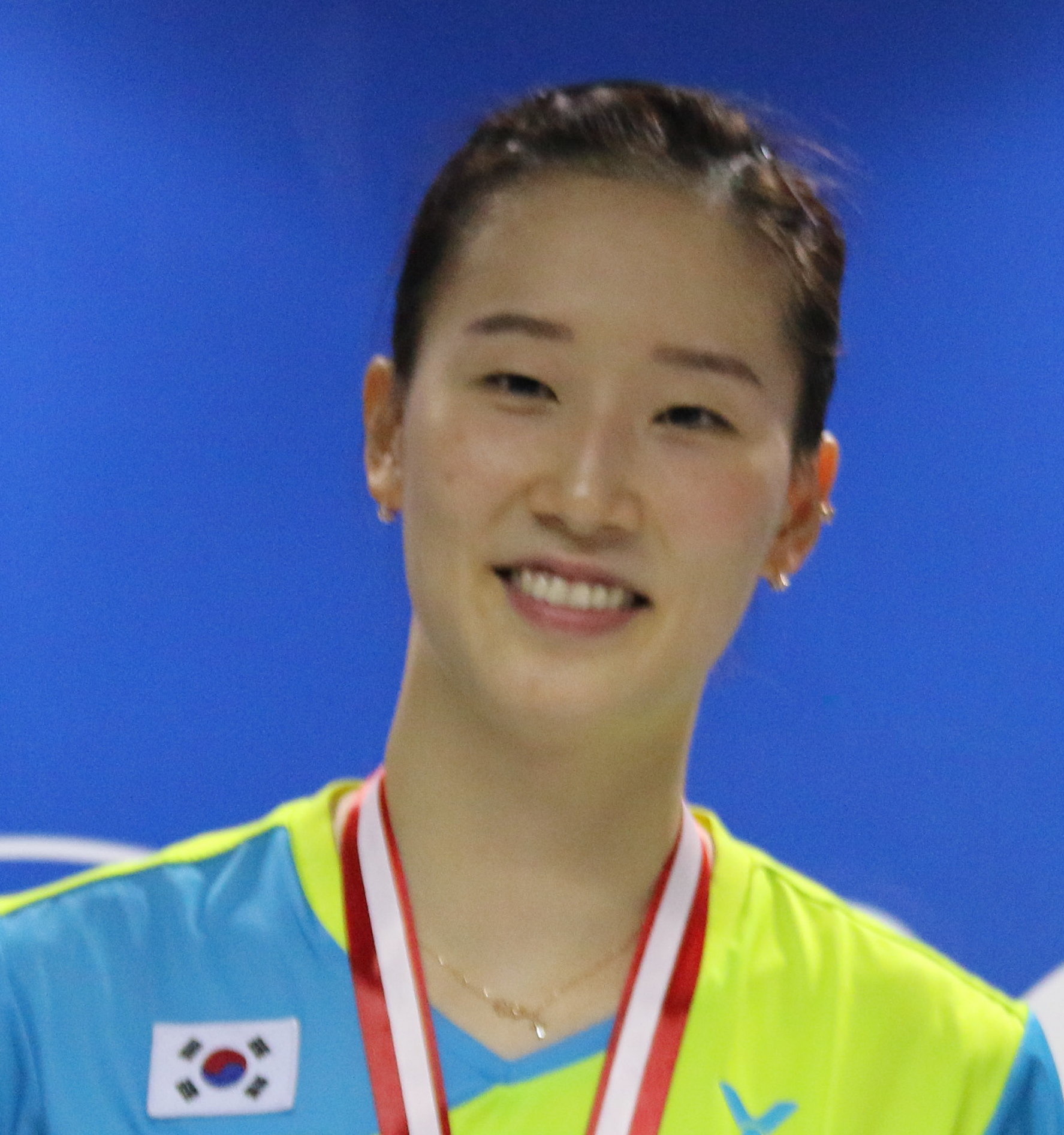
- Chang at the 2017 Indonesia Super Series Premier

Personal information
- Born: 13 December 1989 (age 36) Seoul, South Korea
- Height: 1.72 m (5 ft 8 in)
- Weight: 61 kg (134 lb)

Sport
- Country: South Korea
- Sport: Badminton
- Handedness: Left

Women's & mixed doubles
- Highest ranking: 2 (WD with Lee So-hee 16 November 2017); 8 (XD 16 January 2014)
- Current ranking: 13 (WD with Kim Hye-rin 30 August 2022)
- BWF profile
Medal record
Women's badminton
Representing South Korea
World Championships
Silver medal – second place	2013 Guangzhou	Women's doubles
Sudirman Cup
Gold medal – first place	2017 Gold Coast	Mixed team
Silver medal – second place	2013 Kuala Lumpur	Mixed team
Bronze medal – third place	2011 Qingdao	Mixed team
Bronze medal – third place	2015 Donggguan	Mixed team
Uber Cup
Gold medal – first place	2010 Kuala Lumpur	Women's team
Silver medal – second place	2012 Wuhan	Women's team
Silver medal – second place	2016 Kunshan	Women's team
Bronze medal – third place	2014 New Delhi	Women's team
Asian Games
Silver medal – second place	2014 Incheon	Women's team
Bronze medal – third place	2010 Guangzhou	Women's team
Asian Championships
Silver medal – second place	2014 Gimcheon	Mixed doubles
Bronze medal – third place	2016 Wuhan	Women's doubles
Bronze medal – third place	2017 Wuhan	Women's doubles
Asia Mixed Team Championships
Silver medal – second place	2017 Ho Chi Minh	Mixed team
Asia Team Championships
Silver medal – second place	2020 Manila	Women's team
Bronze medal – third place	2016 Hyderabad	Women's team
Bronze medal – third place	2018 Alor Setar	Women's team
Summer Universiade
Gold medal – first place	2011 Shenzhen	Women's doubles
Gold medal – first place	2013 Kazan	Women's doubles
Gold medal – first place	2013 Kazan	Mixed team
Asian Junior Championships
Bronze medal – third place	2005 Jakarta	Girls' team

Korean name
- Hangul: 장예나
- RR: Jang Yena
- MR: Chang Yena
- IPA: [tɕaŋ.je.na]

Chang Ye-na (Korean: 장예나; born 13 December 1989) is a South Korean badminton player who specializes in doubles. She competed at the 2016 Summer Olympics in Rio de Janeiro, Brazil. She won gold medals at the 2013 Kazan Universiade in the mixed team and women's doubles event partnered with Kim So-yeong. She also won silver medal at the 2013 BWF World Championships with Eom Hye-won. In 2017, she helped the Korean national team to win the world team championships at the Sudirman Cup.

== Achievements ==
=== BWF World Championships ===
Women's doubles
Year	Venue	Partner	Opponent	Score	Result
2013	Tianhe Sports Center; Guangzhou, China	(South Korea) Eom Hye-won	(China) Wang Xiaoli (China) Yu Yang	14–21, 21–18, 8–21	Silver

=== Asian Championships ===
Women's doubles
Year	Venue	Partner	Opponent	Score	Result
2016	Wuhan Sports Center Gymnasium; Wuhan, China	(South Korea) Lee So-hee	(Japan) Misaki Matsutomo (Japan) Ayaka Takahashi	16–21, 19–21	Bronze
2017	Wuhan Sports Center Gymnasium; Wuhan, China	(South Korea) Lee So-hee	(Japan) Misaki Matsutomo (Japan) Ayaka Takahashi	14–21, 10–21	Bronze

Mixed doubles
Year	Venue	Partner	Opponent	Score	Result
2014	Gimcheon Indoor Stadium; Gimcheon, South Korea	(South Korea) Shin Baek-cheol	(Hong Kong) Lee Chun Hei (Hong Kong) Chau Hoi Wah	21–13, 15–21, 15–21	Silver

=== Summer Universiade ===
Women's doubles
Year	Venue	Partner	Opponent	Score	Result
2011	Gymnasium of SZIIT; Shenzhen, China	(South Korea) Eom Hye-won	(Chinese Taipei) Pai Hsiao-ma (Chinese Taipei) Cheng Shao-chieh	21–11, 21–14	Gold
2013	Tennis Academy; Kazan, Russia	(South Korea) Kim So-young	(China) Luo Yu (China) Tian Qing	27–25, 15–21, 23–21	Gold

=== BWF World Tour (2 titles, 3 runners-up) ===
The BWF World Tour, which was announced on 19 March 2017 and implemented in 2018, is a series of elite badminton tournaments sanctioned by the Badminton World Federation (BWF). The BWF World Tour is divided into levels of World Tour Finals, Super 1000, Super 750, Super 500, Super 300 (part of the HSBC World Tour), and the BWF Tour Super 100.

Women's doubles
Year	Tournament	Level	Partner	Opponent	Score	Result
2018	Korea Masters	Super 300	(South Korea) Jung Kyung-eun	(South Korea) Lee So-hee (South Korea) Shin Seung-chan	21–14, 21–17	(gold) Winner
2019	Swiss Open	Super 300	(South Korea) Jung Kyung-eun	(Japan) Nami Matsuyama (Japan) Chiharu Shida	21–16, 21–13	(gold) Winner
2019	Canada Open	Super 100	(South Korea) Kim Hye-rin	(Australia) Setyana Mapasa (Australia) Gronya Somerville	16–21, 14–21	(silver) Runner-up
2019	Hong Kong Open	Super 500	(South Korea) Kim Hye-rin	(China) Chen Qingchen (China) Jia Yifan	11–21, 21–13, 15–21	(silver) Runner-up
2019	Syed Modi International	Super 300	(South Korea) Kim Hye-rin	(South Korea) Baek Ha-na (South Korea) Jung Kyung-eun	21–23, 15–21	(silver) Runner-up

=== BWF Superseries (2 titles, 6 runners-up) ===
The BWF Superseries, which was launched on 14 December 2006 and implemented in 2007, was a series of elite badminton tournaments, sanctioned by the Badminton World Federation (BWF). BWF Superseries levels were Superseries and Superseries Premier. A season of Superseries consisted of twelve tournaments around the world that had been introduced since 2011. Successful players were invited to the Superseries Finals, which were held at the end of each year.

Women's doubles
Year	Tournament	Partner	Opponent	Score	Result
2015	Malaysia Open	(South Korea) Jung Kyung-eun	(China) Luo Ying (China) Luo Yu	18–21, 9–21	(silver) Runner-up
2015	Korea Open	(South Korea) Lee So-hee	(Indonesia) Nitya Krishinda Maheswari (Indonesia) Greysia Polii	15–21, 18–21	(silver) Runner-up
2016	French Open	(South Korea) Lee So-hee	(China) Chen Qingchen (China) Jia Yifan	16–21, 17–21	(silver) Runner-up
2016	China Open	(South Korea) Lee So-hee	(China) Huang Dongping (China) Li Yinhui	13–21, 21–14, 21–17	(gold) Winner
2017	All England Open	(South Korea) Lee So-hee	(Denmark) Christinna Pedersen (Denmark) Kamilla Rytter Juhl	21–18, 21–13	(gold) Winner
2017	Indonesia Open	(South Korea) Lee So-hee	(China) Chen Qingchen (China) Jia Yifan	19–21, 21–15, 10–21	(silver) Runner-up
2017	Korea Open	(South Korea) Lee So-hee	(China) Huang Yaqiong (China) Yu Xiaohan	11–21, 15–21	(silver) Runner-up

Mixed doubles
Year	Tournament	Partner	Opponent	Score	Result
2011	China Masters	(South Korea) Yoo Yeon-seong	(China) Xu Chen (China) Ma Jin	13–21, 16–21	(silver) Runner-up

BWF Super Series Premier tournament
BWF Super Series tournament

=== BWF Grand Prix (9 titles, 9 runners-up) ===
The BWF Grand Prix had two levels, the Grand Prix and Grand Prix Gold. It was a series of badminton tournaments sanctioned by the Badminton World Federation (BWF) and played between 2007 and 2017.

Women's doubles
Year	Tournament	Partner	Opponent	Score	Result
2011	Macau Open	(South Korea) Eom Hye-won	(South Korea) Jung Kyung-eun (South Korea) Kim Ha-na	4–8 retired	(silver) Runner-up
2011	Korea Grand Prix Gold	(South Korea) Eom Hye-won	(Singapore) Shinta Mulia Sari (Singapore) Yao Lei	21–15, 21–16	(gold) Winner
2012	Indonesia Grand Prix Gold	(South Korea) Eom Hye-won	(Japan) Misaki Matsutomo (Japan) Ayaka Takahashi	12–21, 21–12, 13–21	(silver) Runner-up
2012	Macau Open	(South Korea) Eom Hye-won	(South Korea) Choi Hye-in (South Korea) Kim So-young	21–18, 21–16	(gold) Winner
2012	Korea Grand Prix Gold	(South Korea) Eom Hye-won	(South Korea) Lee So-hee (South Korea) Shin Seung-chan	21–13, 21–17	(gold) Winner
2013	Korea Grand Prix Gold	(South Korea) Kim So-young	(South Korea) Go Ah-ra (South Korea) Yoo Hae-won	21–15, 21–12	(gold) Winner
2014	Korea Grand Prix	(South Korea) Yoo Hae-won	(South Korea) Lee So-hee (South Korea) Shin Seung-chan	8–15 retired	(silver) Runner-up
2015	Thailand Open	(South Korea) Lee So-hee	(China) Huang Dongping (China) Li Yinhui	22–20, 11–21, 15–21	(silver) Runner-up
2015	Korea Masters	(South Korea) Lee So-hee	(South Korea) Jung Kyung-eun (South Korea) Shin Seung-chan	21–7, 16–21, 21–19	(gold) Winner
2015	U.S. Grand Prix	(South Korea) Lee So-hee	(South Korea) Jung Kyung-eun (South Korea) Shin Seung-chan	22–24, 21–18, 12–21	(silver) Runner-up
2016	New Zealand Open	(South Korea) Lee So-hee	(Japan) Yuki Fukushima (Japan) Sayaka Hirota	13–21, 16–21	(silver) Runner-up

Mixed doubles
Year	Tournament	Partner	Opponent	Score	Result
2011	Korea Grand Prix Gold	(South Korea) Yoo Yeon-seong	(South Korea) Kim Ki-jung (South Korea) Jung Kyung-eun	21–17, 21–19	(gold) Winner
2012	Korea Grand Prix Gold	(South Korea) Yoo Yeon-seong	(South Korea) Shin Baek-choel (South Korea) Eom Hye-won	21–11, 18–21, 23–25	(silver) Runner-up
2013	German Open	(South Korea) Shin Baek-cheol	(Denmark) Anders Kristiansen (Denmark) Julie Houmann	21–19, 19–21, 24–22	(gold) Winner
2013	Australian Open	(South Korea) Shin Baek-cheol	(Indonesia) Irfan Fadhilah (Indonesia) Weni Anggraini	14–21, 24–22, 16–21	(silver) Runner-up
2013	Chinese Taipei Open	(South Korea) Shin Baek-cheol	(South Korea) Yoo Yeon-seong (South Korea) Eom Hye-won	22–20, 12–21, 21–16	(gold) Winner
2013	Korea Grand Prix Gold	(South Korea) Yoo Yeon-seong	(South Korea) Kang Ji-wook (South Korea) Choi Hye-in	21–13, 21–11	(gold) Winner
2014	Korea Grand Prix	(South Korea) Shin Baek-cheol	(South Korea) Choi Sol-gyu (South Korea) Shin Seung-chan	Walkover	(silver) Runner-up

BWF Grand Prix Gold tournament
BWF Grand Prix tournament

=== BWF International Challenge/Series (2 runners-up) ===
Women's doubles
Year	Tournament	Partner	Opponent	Score	Result
2008	Korea International	(South Korea) Kim Mi-young	(South Korea) Ha Jung-eun (South Korea) Kim Min-jung	15–21, 14–21	(silver) Runner-up
2008	Malaysia International	(South Korea) Kim Mi-young	(South Korea) Bae Seung-hee (South Korea) Park Sun-young	21–13, 15–21, 5–21	(silver) Runner-up

BWF International Challenge tournament
BWF International Series tournament
