= 2008–09 European Badminton Circuit season =

The 2008-09 European Badminton Circuit season started in May 2008 and ended in May 2009.

== Results ==
=== Winners ===
Circuit	Men's singles	Women's singles	Men's doubles	Women's doubles	Mixed doubles
Slovenian International	(Czech Republic) Jan Vondra	(Bulgaria) Linda Zechiri	(Austria) Michael Lahnsteiner (Austria) Peter Zauner	(Sweden) Emelie Lennartsson (Sweden) Emma Wengberg	(Bulgaria) Vladimir Metodiev (Bulgaria) Gabriela Banova
Spanish International	(India) Chetan Anand	(Indonesia) Maria Elfira Christina	(Indonesia) Fran Kurniawan (Indonesia) Rendra Wijaya	(Indonesia) Shendy Puspa Irawati (Indonesia) Meiliana Jauhari	(Indonesia) Rendra Wijaya (Indonesia) Meiliana Jauhari
Le Volant d'Or de Toulouse	(Indonesia) Andre Kurniawan Tedjono	(Belarus) Olga Konon	(England) Richard Eidestedt (England) Andrew Ellis	(Indonesia) Shendy Puspa Irawati (Indonesia) Meiliana Jauhari	(Indonesia) Fran Kurniawan (Indonesia) Shendy Puspa Irawati
St. Petersburg White Nights	(Finland) Ville Lång	(Germany) Xu Huaiwen	(Poland) Michał Łogosz (Poland) Robert Mateusiak	(Russia) Ekaterina Ananina (Russia) Anastasia Russkikh	(Russia) Vitalij Durkin (Russia) Nina Vislova
Belgian International	(Japan) Kenichi Tago	(Germany) Juliane Schenk	(Scotland) Andrew Bowman (Wales) Martyn Lewis	(Russia) Valeria Sorokina (Russia) Nina Vislova	(Russia) Nina Vislova (Russia) Vitaly Durkin
Czech International	(India) Chetan Anand	(Russia) Ella Diehl	(Denmark) Kasper Henriksen (Denmark) Christian Skovgaard	(Denmark) Helle Nielsen (Denmark) Marie Roepke	(Denmark) Rasmus Bonde (Denmark) Helle Nielsen
Bulgarian International	(Japan) Yuichi Ikeda	(Bulgaria) Petya Nedelcheva	(Russia) Vitaliy Durkin (Russia) Alexandr Nikolaenko	(Russia) Nina Vislova (Russia) Valeria Sorokina	(Russia) Alexandr Nikolaenko (Russia) Nina Vislova
Cyprus International	(Denmark) Kasper Ipsen	(Denmark) Camilla Overgaard	(Iceland) Magnus Ingi Helgason (Iceland) Helgi Johannesson	(Denmark) Maria Helsboel (Denmark) Anne Skelbaek	(Denmark) Peter Moerk (Denmark) Maria Helsboel
Slovak International	(Ukraine) Valeriy Atrashchenkov	(Ukraine) Elena Prus	(Iceland) Magnus Ingi Helgason (Iceland) Helgi Johannesson	(Republic of Ireland) Bing Huang (Republic of Ireland) Chloe Magee	(Ukraine) Valeriy Atrashchenkov (Ukraine) Elena Prus
Hungarian International	(India) Anand Pawar	(Bulgaria) Petya Nedelcheva	(Denmark) Kasper Henriksen (Denmark) Christian Skovgaard	(Russia) Anastasia Prokopenko (Russia) Olga Golovanova	(Russia) Vitaly Durkin (Russia) Nina Vislova
Norwegian International	(Finland) Ville Lang	(China) Zhang Xi	(Germany) Michael Fuchs (Germany) Ingo Kindervater	(Russia) Anastasia Russkikh (Russia) Irina Hlebko	(Germany) Michael Fuchs (Germany) Annekatrin Lillie
Scottish Open	(England) Rajiv Ouseph	(England) Elizabeth Cann	(England) Richard Eidestedt (England) Andrew Ellis	(England) Mariana Agathangelou (Scotland) Jillie Cooper	(Germany) Michael Fuchs (Germany) Annekatrin Lillie
Welsh International	(France) Brice Leverdez	(Estonia) Kati Tolmoff	(Scotland) Andrew Bowman (Wales) Martyn Lewis	(England) Mariana Agathangelou (Scotland) Jillie Cooper	(Scotland) Watson Briggs (Scotland) Jillie Cooper
Irish Open	(England) Rajiv Ouseph	(China) Zhang Xi	(England) Richard Eidestedt (England) Andrew Ellis	(Denmark) Helle Nielsen (Denmark) Marie Roepke	(Denmark) Jacob Chemnitz (Denmark) Marie Roepke
Italian International	(Malaysia) Wong Choong Hann	(Germany) Juliane Schenk	(Germany) Kristof Hopp (Germany) Johannes Schöttler	(Russia) Valeria Sorokina (Russia) Nina Vislova	(Russia) Vitalij Durkin (Russia) Nina Vislova
Greece International	(Chinese Taipei) Hsieh Yu-hsin	(Chinese Taipei) Hung Shih-han	(Chinese Taipei) Chien Yu-hsun (Chinese Taipei) Lin Yen-jui	(Denmark) Maria Helsbol (Denmark) Anne Skelbaek	(Chinese Taipei) Chen Hung-ling (Chinese Taipei) Hsieh Pei-chen
Estonian International	(Finland) Ville Lång	(Russia) Tatjana Bibik	(Japan) Naoki Kawamae (Japan) Shoji Sato	(China) Cai Jiani (China) Rong Bo	(China) Zhang Yi (China) Cai Jiani
Swedish International	(Denmark) Jan Ø. Jørgensen	(Japan) Yu Hirayama	(Japan) Naoki Kawamae (Japan) Shōji Satō	(Netherlands) Rachel van Cutsen (Netherlands) Paulien van Dooremalen	(Ukraine) Valeriy Atrashchenkov (Ukraine) Elena Prus
Austrian International	(Japan) Kazuteru Kozai	(Germany) Juliane Schenk	(Japan) Naoki Kawamae (Japan) Shoji Sato	(Japan) Shizuka Matsuo (Japan) Mami Naito	(England) Robert Adcock (England) Heather Olver
Croatian International	(Denmark) Peter Mikkelsen	(Malaysia) Anita Raj Kaur	(Denmark) Mads Conrad-Petersen (Denmark) Mads Pieler Kolding	(Turkey) Ezgi Epice (Germany) Claudia Vogelsang	(Croatia) Zvonimir Durkinjak (Croatia) Stasa Poznanovic
Romanian International	(Indonesia) Dionysius Hayom Rumbaka	(Bulgaria) Petya Nedelcheva	(Bulgaria) Julian Hristov (Bulgaria) Vladimir Metodiev	(Bulgaria) Petya Nedelcheva (Bulgaria) Dimitria Popstoikova	(Ukraine) Valeriy Atrashchenkov (Ukraine) Elena Prus
Polish Open	(Netherlands) Dicky Palyama	(Poland) Wang Linling	(Chinese Taipei) Lin Yu-lang (Chinese Taipei) Chen Hung-ling	(Bulgaria) Diana Dimova (Bulgaria) Petya Nedelcheva	(Poland) Michał Łogosz (Poland) Olga Konon
Finnish International	(Denmark) Peter Mikkelsen	(Germany) Juliane Schenk	(Chinese Taipei) Chen Hung-ling (Chinese Taipei) Lin Yu-lang	(Russia) Valeria Sorokina (Russia) Nina Vislova	(Russia) Vitalij Durkin (Russia) Nina Vislova
Dutch International	(Netherlands) Dicky Palyama	(Germany) Juliane Schenk	(Denmark) Mads Conrad-Petersen (Denmark) Mads Pieler Kolding	(Denmark) Line Damkjær Kruse (Denmark) Mie Schjøtt-Kristensen	(Germany) Johannes Schöttler (Germany) Birgit Michels
Portugal International	(Sweden) Magnus Sahlberg	(England) Jill Pittard	(Spain) Ruben Gordown (Spain) Stenny Kusuma	(Sweden) Emelie Lennartsson (Sweden) Emma Wengberg	(Poland) Lukasz Moren (Poland) Natalia Pocztowiak

=== Performance by countries ===
Tabulated below are the Circuit performances based on countries. Only countries who have won a title are listed:

No.	Team	SLO	ESP	FRA	RUS	BEL	CZE	BUL	CYP	SVK	HUN	NOR	SCO	WLS	IRL	ITA	GRE	EST	SWE	AUT	CRO	ROM	POL	FIN	NLD	POR	Total
1	Denmark	1					3		4		1				2		1		1		2			1	2		17
2	Russia				2	2	1	3			2	1				2		1						2			15
3	Germany				1	1						2	1			2				1	1			1	2		12
4	England			1									4	1	2					1						1	10
5	Bulgaria	2						1			1											3	1				8
5	Indonesia		4	3																		1					8
5	Japan					1		1									1		2	3							8
8	Chinese Taipei																4						1	1			6
9	Scotland					1							1	3													5
9	Ukraine									3									1			1					5
11	China											1			1		2										4
11	Poland				1																		2			1	4
13	Finland				1							1					1										3
13	India		1				1				1																3
13	Netherlands																		1				1		1		3
13	Sweden	1																								2	3
17	Iceland								1	1																	2
17	Malaysia															1					1						2
17	Wales					1								1													2
20	Belarus			1	7																						1
20	Croatia																				1						1
20	Czech Republic	1																									1
20	Estonia													1													1
20	France													1													1
20	Ireland									1																	1
20	Spain																									1	1
20	Turkey																				1						1
