= 2007 Bitburger Open Grand Prix =

Tournament details
- Dates: October 2, 2007 – October 7, 2007
- Edition: 20th
- Level: Grand Prix
- Competitors: 270 from 29 nations
- Total prize money: US$70,000
- Venue: Saarlandhalle
- Location: Saarbrücken, Germany

Champions
- Men's singles: (China) Lü Yi
- Women's singles: (China) Wang Yihan
- Men's doubles: (Denmark) Mathias Boe (Denmark) Carsten Mogensen
- Women's doubles: (China) Yang Wei (China) Zhang Jiewen
- Mixed doubles: (Germany) Kristof Hopp (Germany) Birgit Overzier

The 2007 Bitburger Open Grand Prix was a badminton tournament which took place in Saarbrücken, Germany from 2 to 7 October 2007. It had a total purse of $70,000.

== Tournament ==
The 2007 Bitburger Open Grand Prix was the eighth tournament of the 2007 BWF Grand Prix Gold and Grand Prix and also part of the Bitburger Open championships which has been held since 1988. This tournament was organized by the German Badminton Association and sanctioned by the BWF.

=== Venue ===
This international tournament was held at Saarlandhalle in Saarbrücken, Germany.

=== Point distribution ===
Below is the point distribution for each phase of the tournament based on the BWF points system for the BWF Grand Prix event.

Winner	Runner-up	3/4	5/8	9/16	17/32	33/64	65/128	129/256	257/512
5,500	4,680	3,850	3,030	2,110	1,290	510	240	100	45

=== Prize money ===
The total prize money for this tournament was US$70,000. Distribution of prize money was in accordance with BWF regulations.

Event	Winner	Finals	Semi-finals	Quarter-finals	Last 16
Singles	$5,250	$2,660	$1,015	$420	$245
Doubles	$5,530	$2,660	$980	$507.5	$262.5

== Men's singles ==
=== Seeds ===
1. (Poland) Przemysław Wacha (second round)
2. (Malaysia) Lee Tsuen Seng (final)
3. (India) Anup Sridhar (third round)
4. (Denmark) Joachim Persson (semi-finals)
5. (Canada) Andrew Dabeka (second round)
6. (Denmark) Kasper Ødum (second round)
7. (Germany) Björn Joppien (quarter-finals)
8. (India) Chetan Anand (third round)

=== Finals ===
Semi-finals
(China) Lü Yi	21	21
4	(Denmark) Joachim Persson	13	15
Q2	(Germany) Marc Zwiebler	10	23	15
2	(Malaysia) Lee Tsuen Seng	21	21	21

Final
(China) Lü Yi	23	19	21
2	(Malaysia) Lee Tsuen Seng	21	21	15

=== Top half ===
==== Section 1 ====
First Round
(China) Lü Y	21	21
(Germany) S Schöttler	17	8
(Denmark) P Mikkelsen	21	21
(Algeria) N Lasmari	8	18
(Indonesia) I B Ade Chandra	21	21
Q5	(Switzerland) S Razi	17	12
(Denmark) M Christensen	21	21
(Switzerland) O Andrey	11	14
(India) Parupalli K	21	21
Q6	(Germany) A Roovers	13	9
(Austria) J Koch	21	9
(Denmark) J Ø. Jørgensen	23	21

Second Round
1	(Poland) P Wacha	19	7
(China) Lü Y	21	21
(Denmark) P Mikkelsen	21	21
(Indonesia) I B Ade Chandra	16	15
7	(Germany) B Joppien	12	23	21
(Denmark) M Christensen	21	21	18
(India) Parupalli K	17	17
(Denmark) J Ø. Jørgensen	21	21

Third Round
(China) Lü Y	21	17	21
(Denmark) P Mikkelsen	13	21	18
7	(Germany) B Joppien	21	21
(Denmark) J Ø. Jørgensen	15	18

Quarter-finals
(China) Lü Y	21	21
7	(Germany) B Joppien	9	18

==== Section 2 ====
First Round
Q8	(Germany) M Pohl	12	20
(Austria) M Lahnsteiner	21	22
(Germany) D Domke	19	20
(Slovenia) L Petrič	21	22
(Republic of Ireland) S Evans	10	18
(India) A Pawar	21	21
(Germany) M Reuter	22	9
(Indonesia) E Kurniawan	24	21
(England) R Ouseph	21	21
(Denmark) K Midtgaard	16	17
(China) Qui YB	21	21
(Netherlands) R Massing	16	14

Second Round
4	(Denmark) J Persson	21	21
(Austria) M Lahnsteiner	19	18
(Slovenia) L Petrič	21	21
(India) A Pawar	16	19
8	(India) C Anand	21	21
(Indonesia) E Kurniawan	18	10
(England) R Ouseph	12	10
(China) Qui YB	21	21

Third Round
4	(Denmark) J Persson	21	21
(Slovenia) L Petrič	12	15
8	(India) C Anand	21	13	17
(China) Qui YB	14	21	21

Quarter-finals
4	(Denmark) J Persson	17	21	21
(China) Qui YB	21	19	15

=== Bottom half ===
==== Section 3 ====
First Round
(Lithuania) K Navickas	21	6	21
(Germany) S E Kastens	12	21	18
(Algeria) Z Ammar	11	9
(Austria) H Götschl	21	21
(England) N Rice	17	19
(China) Wu YY	21	21
(Denmark) N C Kaldau	16	21	14
Q2	(Germany) M Zwiebler	21	15	21
(Indonesia) B S Pamungkas	21	21
PFQ	(Switzerland) J Lindholm	15	18
Q1	(Switzerland) A Dumartheray	12	17
(Germany) D Gunawi	21	21

Second Round
(Lithuania) K Navickas	21	21
(Austria) H Götschl	10	19
(China) Wu YY	21	21
6	(Denmark) K Ødum	16	18
Q2	(Germany) M Zwiebler	22	21
(Indonesia) B S Pamungkas	20	8
(Germany) D Gunawi	12	23	9
3	(India) A Sridhar	21	21	21

Third Round
(Lithuania) K Navickas	18	16
(China) Wu YY	21	21
Q2	(Germany) M Zwiebler	21	21
3	(India) A Sridhar	12	19

Quarter-finals
(China) Wu YY	18	18
Q2	(Germany) M Zwiebler	21	21

==== Section 4 ====
First Round
Q7	(Germany) D Benz	29	11
(Switzerland) C Bösiger	30	21
PFQ	(Germany) D Nyenhuis	10	14
(Denmark) S Gavnholt	21	21
(Denmark) R Ulsing	22	21
(India) N Kanetkar	20	10
(Denmark) H-K Vittinghus	12	21	21
(England) C Baxter	21	12	18
Q4	(Netherlands) L Oey	25	19	17
(Germany) R Spitko	23	21	21
PFQ	(Germany) M Kuchenbecker	22	21
Q3	(Germany) K Waldenberger	20	16

Second Round
(Switzerland) C Bösiger	21	13	21
(Denmark) S Gavnholt	15	21	13
(Denmark) R Ulsing	21	21
5	(Canada) A Dabeka	16	18
(Denmark) H-K Vittinghus	21	21
(Germany) R Spitko	14	8
PFQ	(Germany) M Kuchenbecker	11	12
2	(Malaysia) Lee T S	21	21

Third Round
(Switzerland) C Bösiger	21	13	6
(Denmark) R Ulsing	16	21	21
(Denmark) H-K Vittinghus	5	17
2	(Malaysia) Lee T S	21	21

Quarter-finals
(Denmark) R Ulsing	15	14
2	(Malaysia) Lee T S	21	21

== Women's singles ==
=== Seeds ===
1. (Germany) Huaiwen Xu (quarter-finals)
2. (China) Jiang Yanjiao (semi-finals)
3. (Germany) Juliane Schenk (final)
4. (Russia) Ella Diehl (quarter-finals)
5. (Netherlands) Judith Meulendijks (second round)
6. (Sweden) Sara Persson (withdrew)
7. (Ukraine) Larisa Griga (second round)
8. (Iceland) Ragna Ingólfsdóttir (first round)

=== Finals ===
Semi-finals
(China) Zhu Jingjing	19	22	17
(China) Wang Yihan	21	20	21
3	(Germany) Juliane Schenk	21	18	21
2	(China) Jiang Yanjiao	14	21	12

Final
(China) Wang Yihan	16	21	21
3	(Germany) Juliane Schenk	21	10	17

=== Top half ===
==== Section 1 ====
First Round
1	(Germany) HW Xu	21	21
(Denmark) C Sørensen	13	9
(Austria) S Prutsch	22	12	18
Q2	(Netherlands) P Stolzenbach	20	21	21
7	(Ukraine) L Griga	19	21	21
(France) E Chanteur	21	14	15
(Switzerland) J Cicognini	10	12
(China) Zhu JJ	21	21

Second Round
1	(Germany) HW Xu	21	21
Q2	(Netherlands) P Stolzenbach	19	7
7	(Ukraine) L Griga	10	10
(China) Zhu JJ	21	21

Quarter-finals
1	(Germany) HW Xu	19	19
(China) Zhu JJ	21	21

==== Section 2 ====
First Round
4	(Russia) E Diehl	21	21
(Canada) S MacMaster	13	14
(Portugal) A Moura	12	14
(India) A Mutatkar	21	21
5	(Netherlands) J Meulendijks	21	21
Q4	(Germany) J Köhler	13	14
(China) Wang YH	21	21
(Germany) C Bott	15	8

Second Round
4	(Russia) E Diehl	17	21	21
(India) A Mutatkar	21	14	10
5	(Netherlands) J Meulendijks	13	16
(China) Wang YH	21	21

Quarter-finals
4	(Russia) E Diehl	13	15
(China) Wang YH	21	21

=== Bottom half ===
==== Section 3 ====
First Round
Q3	(Netherlands) Y-M Wong	21	15
(Austria) C Mayer	19	4^{r}
Q1	(Germany) K Michalowsky	21	21
PFQ	(India) S Kurien	14	19
(Canada) C Reid	12	14
(Vietnam) Lê Ngọc N N	21	21
(Belgium) N Descamps	20	16
3	(Germany) J Schenk	22	21

Second Round
Q3	(Netherlands) Y-M Wong	12	7
Q1	(Germany) K Michalowsky	21	21
(Vietnam) Lê Ngọc N N	8	13
3	(Germany) J Schenk	21	21

Quarter-finals
Q1	(Germany) K Michalowsky	8	15
3	(Germany) J Schenk	21	21

==== Section 4 ====
First Round
(Lithuania) A Stapušaitytė	17	12
(India) T Murgunde	21	21
(Denmark) N Brosolat Jensen	21	21
8	(Iceland) R Ingólfsdóttir	16	10
(Japan) M Fujii	17	21	17
(England) J Pittard	21	16	21
(Netherlands) R van Cutsen	17	17
2	(China) Jiang YJ	21	21

Second Round
(India) T Murgunde	21	21
(Denmark) N Brosolat Jensen	12	19
(England) J Pittard	13	14
2	(China) Jiang YJ	21	21

Quarter-finals
(India) T Murgunde	21	11	15
2	(China) Jiang YJ	17	21	21

== Men's doubles ==
=== Seeds ===
1. (Germany) Michael Fuchs / Roman Spitko (second round)
2. (Germany) Kristof Hopp / Ingo Kindervater (quarter-finals)
3. (Denmark) Rasmus Andersen / Peter Steffensen (quarter-finals)
4. (England) Robert Adcock / Robin Middleton (second round)
5. (England) Robert Blair / David Lindley (final)
6. (Germany) Tim Dettmann / Johannes Schöttler (second round)
7. (China) Sun Junjie / Xu Chen (semi-finals)
8. (China) He Hanbin / Shen Ye (semi-finals)

=== Finals ===
Semi-finals
7	(China) Sun Junjie (China) Xu Chen	21	17	18
(Denmark) Mathias Boe (Denmark) Carsten Mogensen	19	21	21
5	(England) Robert Blair (England) David Lindley	21	21
8	(China) He Hanbin (China) Shen Ye	14	18

Final
(Denmark) Mathias Boe (Denmark) Carsten Mogensen	21	21
5	(England) Robert Blair (England) David Lindley	17	15

=== Top half ===
==== Section 1 ====
First Round
1	(Germany) M Fuchs (Germany) R Spitko	22	21
SUB	(England) A Ellis (Wales) M Lewis	20	12
(Denmark) J Chemnitz (Denmark) M Delbo Larsen	21	21
(Germany) D Benz (Germany) F Schoppmann	10	19
7	(China) Sun JJ (China) Xu C	21	21
(Germany) A Heinz (Germany) P Krämer	8	7
(England) R Eidestedt (England) C Langridge	21	21
SUB	(Algeria) Z Ammar (Algeria) N Lasmari	8	15

Second Round
1	(Germany) M Fuchs (Germany) R Spitko	11	22	12
(Denmark) J Chemnitz (Denmark) M Delbo Larsen	21	20	21
7	(China) Sun JJ (China) Xu C	w	/	o
(England) R Eidestedt (England) C Langridge

Quarter-finals
(Denmark) J Chemnitz (Denmark) M Delbo Larsen	21	5	15
7	(China) Sun JJ (China) Xu C	16	21	21

==== Section 2 ====
First Round
4	(England) R Adcock (England) R Middleton	21	21
(Netherlands) J de Ruiter (Netherlands) J Wouters	14	10
Q3	(Germany) C Böhmer (Germany) K Waldenberger	14	22
(Germany) P Käsbauer (Germany) O Roth	21	24
6	(Germany) T Dettmann (Germany) J Schöttler	21	14	21
(Austria) P Zauner (Austria) R Zirnwald	18	21	17
(Denmark) M Boe (Denmark) C Mogensen	21	21
Q2	(Germany) S Rduch (Germany) J Zurwonne	5	16

Second Round
4	(England) R Adcock (England) R Middleton	20	17
(Germany) P Käsbauer (Germany) O Roth	22	21
6	(Germany) T Dettmann (Germany) J Schöttler	17	19
(Denmark) M Boe (Denmark) C Mogensen	21	21

Quarter-finals
(Germany) P Käsbauer (Germany) O Roth	13	16
(Denmark) M Boe (Denmark) C Mogensen	21	21

=== Bottom half ===
==== Section 3 ====
First Round
SUB	(Belgium) J Gillis (Netherlands) J Maas	21	13	21
(Germany) F Hammes (Germany) H Käsbauer	17	21	18
(France) B Carême (France) M Quéré	6	20
5	(England) R Blair (England) D Lindley	21	22
(Switzerland) S Enkerli (Switzerland) C Heiniger	8	16
(Germany) J Cassel (Germany) T Tesche	21	21
(Belgium) W Claes (Belgium) F Mawet	10	12
3	(Denmark) R Andersen (Denmark) P Steffensen	21	21

Second Round
SUB	(Belgium) J Gillis (Netherlands) J Maas	12	9
5	(England) R Blair (England) D Lindley	21	21
(Germany) J Cassel (Germany) T Tesche	21	20	23
3	(Denmark) R Andersen (Denmark) P Steffensen	14	22	25

Quarter-finals
5	(England) R Blair (England) D Lindley	25	21
3	(Denmark) R Andersen (Denmark) P Steffensen	23	9

==== Section 4 ====
First Round
Q4	(Germany) D Nyenhuis (Germany) T Zander	16	19
(Denmark) R Bonde (Denmark) K Henriksen	21	21
(Germany) P Neubacher (Germany) J-S Schulz	12	21	10
8	(China) He HB (China) Shen Y	21	18	21
(England) K Roebuck (Scotland) A Bowman	21	21
SUB	(Netherlands) R Bosch (Netherlands) R Massing	15	14
(England) C Adcock (England) D George	15	13
2	(Germany) K Hopp (Germany) I Kindervater	21	21

Second Round
(Denmark) R Bonde (Denmark) K Henriksen	12	21	12
8	(China) He HB (China) Shen Y	21	16	21
(England) K Roebuck (Scotland) A Bowman	16	17
2	(Germany) K Hopp (Germany) I Kindervater	21	21

Quarter-finals
8	(China) He HB (China) Shen Y	21	14	21
2	(Germany) K Hopp (Germany) I Kindervater	15	21	10

== Women's doubles ==
=== Seeds ===
1. (China) Yang Wei / Zhang Jiewen (champions)
2. (Germany) Nicole Grether / Juliane Schenk (quarter-finals)
3. (Sweden) Elin Bergblom / Johanna Persson (second round)
4. (India) Jwala Gutta / Shruti Kurien (semi-finals)
5. (Scotland) Imogen Bankier / Emma Mason (second round)
6. (Germany) Michaela Peiffer / Kathrin Piotrowski (quarter-finals)
7. (England) Natalie Munt / Joanne Nicholas (final)
8. (Germany) Carina Mette / Birgit Overzier (second round)

=== Finals ===
Semi-finals
1	(China) Yang Wei (China) Zhang Jiewen	21	21
4	(India) Jwala Gutta (India) Shruti Kurien	12	4
(China) Pan Pan (China) Tian Qing	15	21	18
7	(England) Natalie Munt (England) Joanne Nicholas	21	18	21

Final
1	(China) Yang Wei (China) Zhang Jiewen	21	21
7	(England) Natalie Munt (England) Joanne Nicholas	11	10

=== Top half ===
==== Section 1 ====
First Round
1	(China) Yang W (China) Zhang JW	21	21
(Germany) K Buss (Germany) C Vogelgsang	8	6
(England) S Rayappan (England) J Wallwork	21	22
(Germany) A Lillie (Germany) K Michalowsky	15	20
5	(Scotland) I Bankier (Scotland) E Mason	15	21	21
PFQ	(Germany) S Krauspe (Germany) L Ufermann	21	11	17
(Netherlands) R van Cutsen (Netherlands) P van Dooremalen	13	25
(Germany) J Köhler (Germany) S Marinello	21	27

Second Round
1	(China) Yang W (China) Zhang JW	21	26
(England) S Rayappan (England) J Wallwork	8	24
5	(Scotland) I Bankier (Scotland) E Mason	21	18	19
(Germany) J Köhler (Germany) S Marinello	19	21	21

Quarter-finals
1	(China) Yang W (China) Zhang JW	21	21
(Germany) J Köhler (Germany) S Marinello	14	10

==== Section 2 ====
First Round
4	(India) J Gutta (India) S Kurien	21	21
(Netherlands) E Muskens (Netherlands) I Tabeling	17	11
(Denmark) H Nielsen (Denmark) M Røpke	21	21
(Germany) L Heidenreich (Germany) M Stahlberg	8	10
6	(Germany) M Peiffer (Germany) K Piotrowski	21	15	22
(England) S Bok (England) L Parker	19	21	20
(Switzerland) T Pelling (Switzerland) H Razi	11	12
(France) L Choinet (France) E Chanteur	21	21

Second Round
4	(India) J Gutta (India) S Kurien	21	21
(Denmark) H Nielsen (Denmark) M Røpke	16	17
6	(Germany) M Peiffer (Germany) K Piotrowski	21	21
(France) L Choinet (France) E Chanteur	19	15

Quarter-finals
4	(India) J Gutta (India) S Kurien	21	21
6	(Germany) M Peiffer (Germany) K Piotrowski	17	11

=== Bottom half ===
==== Section 3 ====
First Round
(England) M Agathangelou (England) G White	17	10
(Denmark) C Pedersen (Denmark) M Schjøtt-Kristensen	21	21
(Canada) F McKee (Canada) C Reid	12	19
8	(Germany) C Mette (Germany) B Overzier	21	21
(Austria) S Franz (Austria) B Scheer	4	3
(China) Pan P (China) Tian Q	21	21
(Germany) F Burkert (Germany) C Nelte	6	15
3	(Sweden) E Bergblom (Sweden) J Persson	21	21

Second Round
(Denmark) C Pedersen (Denmark) M Schjøtt-Kristensen	21	10	21
8	(Germany) C Mette (Germany) B Overzier	19	21	18
(China) Pan P (China) Tian Q	21	23
3	(Sweden) E Bergblom (Sweden) J Persson	10	21

Quarter-finals
(Denmark) C Pedersen (Denmark) M Schjøtt-Kristensen	15	17
(China) Pan P (China) Tian Q	21	21

==== Section 4 ====
First Round
(Germany) C Bott (Germany) G Köhler	21	3	21
(Netherlands) P Stolzenbach (Netherlands) Y-M Wong	12	21	15
(Belgium) S Annys (Belgium) S Corvilain	14	10
7	(England) N Munt (England) J Nicholas	21	21
Q	(Germany) J Goliszewski (Germany) A Hoffmann	16	21	21
SUB	(Switzerland) S Herzig (Switzerland) M Fischer	21	11	23
SUB	(Germany) V Geuenich (Germany) M Reich	6	8
2	(Germany) N Grether (Germany) J Schenk	21	21

Second Round
(Germany) C Bott (Germany) G Köhler	18	12
7	(England) N Munt (England) J Nicholas	21	21
SUB	(Switzerland) S Herzig (Switzerland) M Fischer	5	10
2	(Germany) N Grether (Germany) J Schenk	21	21

Quarter-finals
7	(England) N Munt (England) J Nicholas	7	21	24
2	(Germany) N Grether (Germany) J Schenk	21	16	22

== Mixed doubles ==
=== Seeds ===
1. (Germany) Ingo Kindervater / Kathrin Piotrowski (semi-finals)
2. (Germany) Kristof Hopp / Birgit Overzier (champions)
3. (England) David Lindley / Suzanne Rayappan (second round)
4. (Germany) Tim Dettmann / Annekatrin Lillie (quarter-finals)
5. (Denmark) Joachim Fischer Nielsen / Britta Andersen (quarter-finals)
6. (England) Robin Middleton / Liza Parker (quarter-finals)
7. (China) Xu Chen / Tian Qing (semi-finals)
8. (China) He Hanbin / Pan Pan (quarter-finals)

=== Finals ===
Semi-finals
1	(Germany) Ingo Kindervater (Germany) Kathrin Piotrowski	21	14	9
(England) Robert Blair (Scotland) Imogen Bankier	19	21	21
7	(China) Xu Chen (China) Tian Qing	19	19
2	(Germany) Kristof Hopp (Germany) Birgit Overzier	21	21

Final
(England) Robert Blair (Scotland) Imogen Bankier	17	17
2	(Germany) Kristof Hopp (Germany) Birgit Overzier	21	21

=== Top half ===
==== Section 1 ====
First Round
1	(Germany) I Kindervater (Germany) K Piotrowski	26	21
(England) C Langridge (England) J Nicholas	24	10
(Austria) R Zirnwald (Austria) T Riedl	18	21	8
(Denmark) P Steffensen (Denmark) J Houmann	21	16	21
8	(China) He HB (China) Pan P	19	22	21
(Denmark) R Bonde (Denmark) C Pedersen	21	20	19
(France) B Carême (France) L Choinet	19	14
(Denmark) J Chemnitz (Denmark) M Røpke	21	21

Second Round
1	(Germany) I Kindervater (Germany) K Piotrowski	21	21
(Denmark) P Steffensen (Denmark) J Houmann	12	6
8	' (China) He HB (China) Pan P	21	21
(Denmark) J Chemnitz (Denmark) M Røpke	19	16

Quarter-finals
1	(Germany) I Kindervater (Germany) K Piotrowski	18	21	21
8	(China) He HB (China) Pan P	21	18	14

==== Section 2 ====
First Round
3	(England) D Lindley (England) S Rayappan	21	18	21
Q2	(Germany) D Nyenhuis (Germany) M Peiffer	15	21	17
(England) R Blair (Scotland) I Bankier	21	21
(Germany) F Schoppmann (Germany) J Goliszewski	13	9
5	(Denmark) J Fischer Nielsen (Denmark) B Andersen	21	21	21
(Germany) M Fuchs (Germany) C Mette	12	23	14
Q1	(Scotland) A Bowman (England) S Bok	21	21
(Netherlands) J de Ruiter (Netherlands) I Vaessen	17	18

Second Round
3	(England) D Lindley (England) S Rayappan	16	17
(England) R Blair (Scotland) I Bankier	21	21
5	(Denmark) J Fischer Nielsen (Denmark) B Andersen	21	21
Q1	(Scotland) A Bowman (England) S Bok	13	12

Quarter-finals
(England) R Blair (Scotland) I Bankier	16	21	21
5	(Denmark) J Fischer Nielsen (Denmark) B Andersen	21	15	8

=== Bottom half ===
==== Section 3 ====
First Round
(England) C Adcock (England) G White	21	20	17
(Denmark) M Delbo Larsen (Denmark) M Schjøtt-Kristensen	14	22	21
(England) K Roebuck (England) J Wallwork	9	15
7	(China) Xu C (China) Tian Q	21	21
(England) D George (England) M Agathangelou	18	21	14
(Germany) J Schöttler (Germany) G Köhler	21	14	21
(Netherlands) R Bosch (Netherlands) P van Dooremalen	13	9
4	(Germany) T Dettmann (Germany) A Lillie	21	21

Second Round
(Denmark) M Delbo Larsen (Denmark) M Schjøtt-Kristensen	19	27	9
7	(China) Xu C (China) Tian Q	21	25	21
(Germany) J Schöttler (Germany) G Köhler	19	21	16
4	(Germany) T Dettmann (Germany) A Lillie	21	15	21

Quarter-finals
7	(China) Xu C (China) Tian Q	w	/	o
4	(Germany) T Dettmann (Germany) A Lillie

==== Section 4 ====
First Round
Q4	(Belgium) F Mawet (Belgium) S Vorvilain	21	21
(Austria) H Götschl (Austria) C Mayer	18	16
(England) R Eidestedt (Scotland) E Mason	13	18
6	(England) R Middleton (England) L Parker	21	21
Q3	(Netherlands) L Oey (Netherlands) S Piek	19	21	19
(Belgium) W Claes (Belgium) N Descamps	21	14	21
(England) R Adcock (England) N Munt	20	10
2	(Germany) K Hopp (Germany) B Overzier	22	21

Second Round
(Belgium) F Mawet (Belgium) S Vorvilain	12	13
6	(England) R Middleton (England) L Parker	21	21
(Belgium) W Claes (Belgium) N Descamps	13	13
2	(Germany) K Hopp (Germany) B Overzier	21	21

Quarter-finals
6	(England) R Middleton (England) L Parker	19	21	13
2	(Germany) K Hopp (Germany) B Overzier	21	17	21

Preceded by 2007 Macau Open Grand Prix Gold	2007 BWF Grand Prix Gold and Grand Prix; 2007 BWF season	Succeeded by 2007 Dutch Open Grand Prix
