= 2006–07 European Badminton Circuit season =

The 2006–07 European Badminton Circuit season started in September 2006 and ended in April 2007.

== Results ==
=== Winners ===
Circuit	Men's singles	Women's singles	Men's doubles	Women's doubles	Mixed doubles
Belgian International	(Denmark) Kasper Ødum	(Germany) Petra Overzier	(Sweden) Imanuel Hirschfeldt (Indonesia) Imam Sodikin	(Russia) Marina Yakusheva (Russia) Elena Shimko	(Russia) Vitalij Durkin (Russia) Valeria Sorokina
Bulgarian International	(Russia) Sergei Ivlev	(Bulgaria) Linda Zetchiri	(Denmark) Rasmus Mangor Andersen (Denmark) Peter Steffensen	(Bulgaria) Petya Nedelcheva (Bulgaria) Diana Dimova	(Germany) Tim Dettmann (Germany) Annekatrin Lillie
Czech International	(Denmark) Jan Ø. Jørgensen	(Iceland) Ragna Ingólfsdóttir	(England) Robert Adcock (England) Robin Middleton	(Denmark) Mie Schjøtt-Kristensen (Denmark) Christinna Pedersen	(England) Liza Parker (England) Robin Middleton
Slovak International	(Czech Republic) Jan Fröhlich	(Slovenia) Maja Tvrdy	(England) Chris Langridge (England) David Lindley	(England) Suzanne Rayappan (England) Sarah Bok	(England) David Lindley (England) Suzanne Rayappan
Cyprus International	(Denmark) Peter Mikkelsen	(Denmark) Anne Marie Pedersen	(Denmark) Mikkel Delbo Larsen (Denmark) Jacob Chemnitz	(France) Weny Rahmawati (France) Élodie Eymard	(France) Svetoslav Stoyanov (France) Élodie Eymard
Hungarian International	(Sweden) George Rimarcdi	(Japan) Chie Umezu	(Sweden) Imanuel Hirschfeld (Sweden) Imam Sodikin	(Russia) Ekaterina Ananina (Russia) Anastasia Russkikh	(Russia) Vladimir Malkov (Russia) Anastasia Russkikh
Iceland International	(Sweden) Magnus Sahlberg	(Iceland) Ragna Ingólfsdóttir	(Denmark) Christoffer Bruun Jensen (Denmark) Morten T. Kronborg	(Scotland) Imogen Bankier (Scotland) Emma Mason	(Sweden) Henri Hurskainen (Sweden) Emma Wengberg
Norwegian International	(Denmark) Hans-Kristian Vittinghus	(Sweden) Sara Persson	(Russia) Anton Nazarenko (Russia) Andrey Ashmarin	(Scotland) Imogen Bankier (Scotland) Emma Mason	(Indonesia) Imam Sodikin (Sweden) Elin Bergblom
Scottish Open	(Finland) Ville Lång	(Russia) Ella Karachkova	(Sweden) Imanuel Hirschfeld (Sweden) Imam Sodikin	(Russia) Marina Yakusheva (Russia) Elena Shimko	(Russia) Vitalij Durkin (Russia) Valeria Sorokina
Welsh International	(Wales) Irwansyah	(Australia) Huang Chia-chi	(Wales) Matthew Hughes (Wales) Martyn Lewis	(England) Natalie Munt (England) Mariana Agathangelou	(England) Kristian Roebuck (England) Natalie Munt
Irish Open	(Denmark) Jens Kristian Leth	(Sweden) Sara Persson	(Germany) Thomas Tesche (Germany) Jochen Cassel	(Scotland) Emma Mason (Scotland) Imogen Bankier	(Belgium) Wouter Claes (Belgium) Nathalie Descamps
Italian International	(Denmark) Jens-Kristian Leth	(Sweden) Sara Persson	(Russia) Alexander Nikolaenko (Russia) Vitalij Durkin	(China) Cai Jaini (China) Qi Yu	(Denmark) Peter Steffensen (Denmark) Mette Schjoldager
Swedish International	(Japan) Kenichi Tago	(China) Li Wenyan	(Indonesia) Imam Sodikin (Sweden) Imanuel Hirschfeld	(China) Guo Xin (China) Cai Jiani	(Denmark) Rasmus Bonde (Denmark) Christinna Pedersen
Austrian International	(China) Lü Yi	(China) Zhu Jingjing	(China) Guo Zhendong (China) He Hanbin	(China) Cheng Shu (China) Zhao Yunlei	(Russia) Vitalij Durkin (Russia) Valeria Sorokina
Croatian International	(England) Carl Baxter	(China) Guo Xin	(Belgium) Wouter Claes (Belgium) Frederic Mawet	(China) Cai Jiani (China) Guo Xin	(Belgium) Wouter Claes (Belgium) Nathalie Descamps
Romanian International	(Japan) Sho Sasaki	(England) Tracey Hallam	(Japan) Kenichi Hayakawa (Japan) Kenta Kazuno	(Canada) Fiona McKee (Canada) Charmaine Reid	(Ukraine) Valeriy Atrashchenkov (Ukraine) Elena Prus
Finnish International	(Denmark) Joachim Persson	(China) Li Wenyan	(Belgium) Frederic Mawet (Belgium) Wouter Claes	(Denmark) Mie Schjøtt-Kristensen (Denmark) Christinna Pedersen	(Germany) Tim Dettmann (Germany) Annekatrin Lillie
Portugal International	(Denmark) Peter Mikkelsen	(Netherlands) Judith Meulendijks	(Denmark) Mikkel Delbo Larsen (Denmark) Jacob Chemnitz	(England) Jenny Wallwork (England) Suzanne Rayappan	(Denmark) Rasmus Bonde (Denmark) Christinna Pedersen
Polish Open	(Ukraine) Vladislav Druzchenko	(Japan) Chie Umezu	(Denmark) Mikkel Delbo Larsen (Denmark) Jacob Chemnitz	(Poland) Kamila Augustyn (Poland) Nadieżda Kostiuczyk	(Poland) Robert Mateusiak (Poland) Nadieżda Kostiuczyk

=== Performance by countries ===
Tabulated below are the Circuit performances based on countries. Only countries who have won a title are listed:

No.	Team	BEL	BUL	CZE	SVK	CYP	HUN	ISL	NOR	SCO	WLS	IRL	ITA	SWE	AUT	CRO	ROM	FIN	POR	POL	Total
1	Denmark	1	1	2		3		1	1			1	2	1				2	3	1	19
2	Russia	2	1				2		1	3			1		1						11
2	Sweden	1					2	2	2	1		1	1	1							11
4	China												1	2	4	2		1			10
4	England			2	3						2					1	1		1		10
6	Belgium											1				2		1			4
6	Germany	1	1									1						1			4
6	Japan						1										2			1	4
9	Indonesia	1							1					1							3
9	Scotland							1	1			1									3
11	Bulgaria		2																		2
11	France					2															2
11	Iceland			1				1													2
11	Poland																			2	2
11	Ukraine																1			1	2
11	Wales										2										2
17	Australia										1										1
17	Canada																1				1
17	Czech Republic				1																1
17	Finland									1											1
17	Netherlands																		1		1
17	Slovenia				1																1
