= Peter Mikkelsen =

Peter Mikkelsen may refer to:

- Peter Mikkelsen (referee) (1960–2019), Danish association football referee
- Peter Mikkelsen (badminton) (born 1982), Danish badminton player
- Peter Nymann Mikkelsen (born 1982), Danish footballer

== See also ==
- Pete Mikkelsen (1939–2006), American baseball player
