= Jillie Cooper =

Scottish badminton player (born 1988)

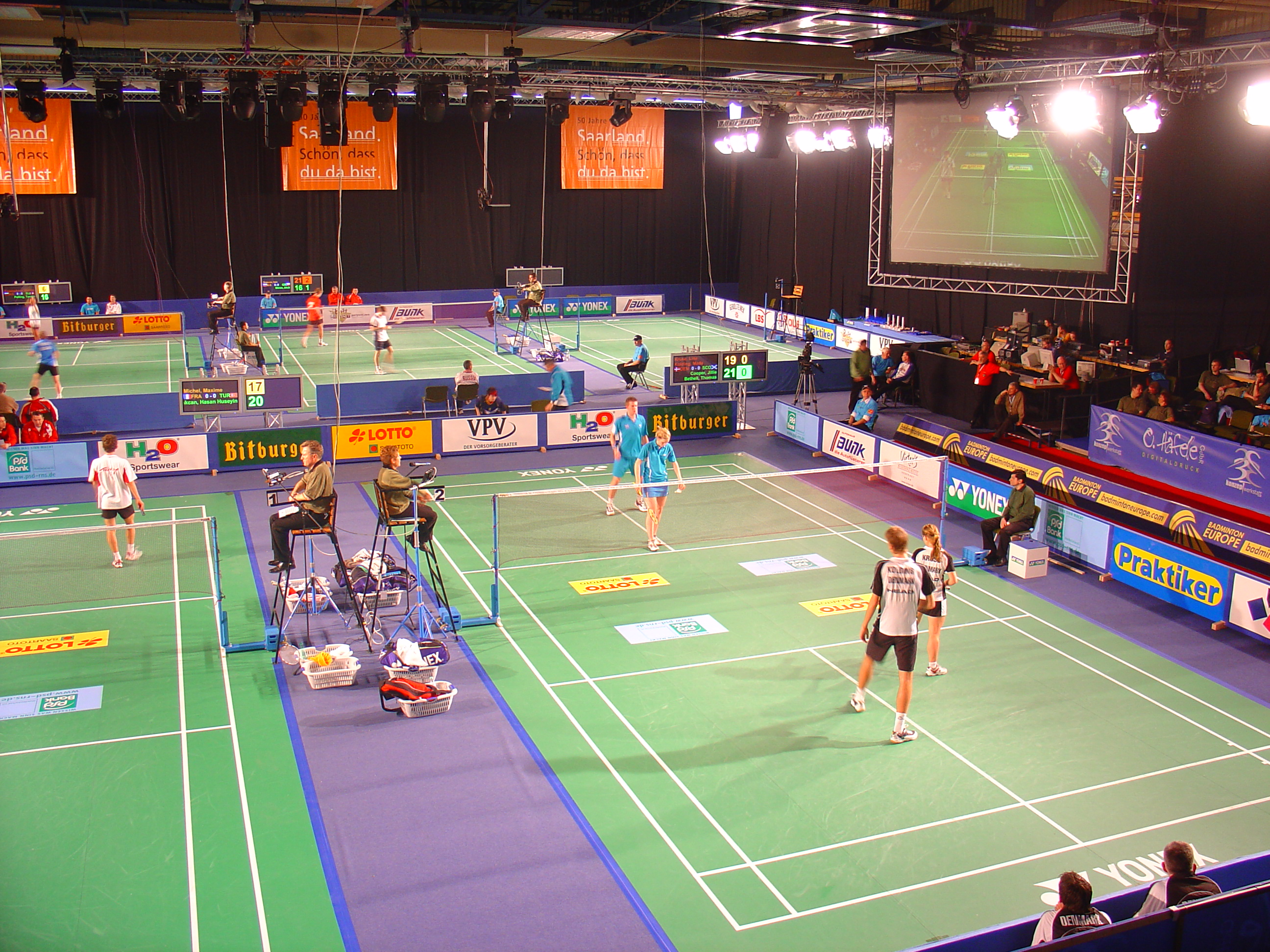

Personal information
- Born: 9 May 1988 (age 38) Edinburgh, Scotland
- Height: 1.78 m (5 ft 10 in)
- Weight: 70 kg (154 lb)

Sport
- Country: Scotland
- Sport: Badminton
- Handedness: Right
- Coached by: Yvette Yun Luo; John Quinn

Women's Doubles & Mixed Doubles
- Highest ranking: 27 (WD) 31 Oct 2013; 39 (XD) 7 Mar 2013
- BWF profile

Jillie Cooper (born 9 May 1988) is a professional badminton player (BWF player id: 53127) who plays for Scotland.

== Career ==
Cooper began her professional career in 2007. She first started playing senior international tournaments when she got to round '1/32' in the Scottish Open 2003 with her doubles partner in November 2003. Since then she had entered many other competitions building up to quarter and semi final stages. More recently she had become the winner of women's doubles for the first time in November 2008 in the Scottish Open, exactly 5 years after her first start there. Cooper then went on to win the Welsh International doubles and mixed Doubles titles one week after her Scottish Open success in December 2008.

As a mixed doubles player, she had reached semi finals stages in 5 competitions to date and the final of Belgian International in September 2008 (29 November 2008). Cooper was also a member of Team Scotland at the 2010 Commonwealth Games in Delhi and Glasgow 2014 Commonwealth Games.

== Achievements ==
=== BWF International Challenge/Series ===
Women's doubles
| Year | Tournament | Partner | Opponent | Score | Result |
|---|---|---|---|---|---|
| 2013 | Czech International | (Scotland) Kirsty Gilmour | (Scotland) Imogen Bankier (Bulgaria) Petya Nedelcheva | 6–21, 14–21 | (silver) Runner-up |
| 2012 | Welsh International | (Scotland) Kirsty Gilmour | (England) Lauren Smith (England) Gabrielle White | 7–21, 14–21 | (silver) Runner-up |
| 2012 | Czech International | (Scotland) Kirsty Gilmour | (England) Heather Olver (England) Kate Robertshaw | 16–21, 15–21 | (silver) Runner-up |
| 2010 | Banuinvest International | (Scotland) Emma Mason | (Singapore) Shinta Mulia Sari (Singapore) Lei Yao | 6–21, 10–21 | (silver) Runner-up |
| 2008 | Welsh International | (England) Mariana Agathangelou | (Netherlands) Ilse Vaessen (Netherlands) Rachel van Cutsen | 17–21, 21–19, 21–16 | (gold) Winner |
| 2008 | Scotland International | (England) Mariana Agathangelou | (Sweden) Emelie Lennartsson (Sweden) Emma Wengberg | 21–17, 21–13 | (gold) Winner |
| 2008 | Spanish Open | (Belgium) Nathalie Descamps | (Indonesia) Shendy Puspa Irawati (Indonesia) Meiliana Jauhari | 10–21, 10–21 | (silver) Runner-up |

Mixed doubles
| Year | Tournament | Partner | Opponent | Score | Result |
|---|---|---|---|---|---|
| 2014 | Romanian International | (Scotland) Martin Campbell | (France) Bastian Kersaudy (France) Teshana Vignes Waran | 21–14, 21–15 | (gold) Winner |
| 2008 | Welsh International | (Scotland) Watson Briggs | (Netherlands) Jorrit de Ruiter (Netherlands) Ilse Vaessen | 21–19, 21–18 | (gold) Winner |
| 2008 | Belgian International | (Scotland) Watson Briggs | (Russia) Vitalij Durkin (Russia) Nina Vislova | 13–21, 9–21 | (silver) Runner-up |

BWF International Challenge tournament
BWF International Series tournament
