= Cai Jiani =

Chinese badminton player (born 1982)

Cai Jiani 蔡佳妮
Personal information
- Born: 1982 (age 43–44)

Sport
- Country: China
- Sport: Badminton

Women's & mixed doubles
- Highest ranking: 99 (XD) 21 January 2010
- BWF profile

Cai Jiani (Chinese: 蔡佳妮, born 1982) is a former Chinese badminton player from the Fujian Kaisheng club who was specializes in doubles. She had won some international tournaments in Europe, and at the 2008 Austrian International, 2008 Portugal International, 2009 Estonian International, she won doubles titles in women's and mixed doubles event.

== Achievements ==
=== BWF International Challenge/Asian Satellite ===
Women's singles
Year	Tournament	Opponent	Score	Result
1999	Smiling Fish Satellite	(China) Liu Zhen	7–11, 8–11	(silver) Runner-up

Women's doubles
Year	Tournament	Partner	Opponent	Score	Result
2009	Estonian International	(China) Bo Rong	(Russia) Irina Khlebko (Russia) Ksenia Polikarpova	21–13, 21–15	(gold) Winner
2008	Portugal International	(China) Zhang Xi	(England) Mariana Agathangelou (England) Gabrielle White	21–17, 21–14	(gold) Winner
2008	Austrian International	(China) Yu Qi	(Russia) Olga Golovanova (Russia) Anastasia Prokopenko	21–16, 21–8	(gold) Winner
2008	Swedish International	(China) Yu Qi	(China) Zhang Xi (China) Lin Qing	21–16, 21–11	(gold) Winner
2007	Croatian International	(China) Guo Xin	(Singapore) Gu Juan (Singapore) Zhang Beiwen	15–21, 21–6, 21–10	(gold) Winner
2007	Swedish International	(China) Guo Xin	(Denmark) Mie Schjött-Kristensen (Denmark) Christinna Pedersen	21–13, 21–14	(gold) Winner
2006	Italian International	(China) Yu Qi	(Russia) Valeria Sorokina (Russia) Nina Vislova	21–12, 21–16	(gold) Winner

Mixed doubles
Year	Tournament	Partner	Opponent	Score	Result
2009	Estonian International	(China) Zhang Yi	(Russia) Andrey Ashmarin (Russia) Ksenia Polikarpova	21–9, 21–14	(gold) Winner
2008	Portugal International	(China) Zhang Yi	(England) Chris Adcock (England) Gabrielle White	21–14, 21–11	(gold) Winner
2008	Austrian International	(China) Zhang Yi	(Belgium) Wouter Claes (Belgium) Nathalie Descamps	21–18, 21–18	(gold) Winner
2007	Hungarian International	(China) Zhang Yi	(Denmark) Mads Pieler Kolding (Denmark) Line Damkjaer Kruse	21–15, 21–17	(gold) Winner

BWF International Series tournament
