= Rendra Wijaya =

Indonesian badminton player (born 1984)

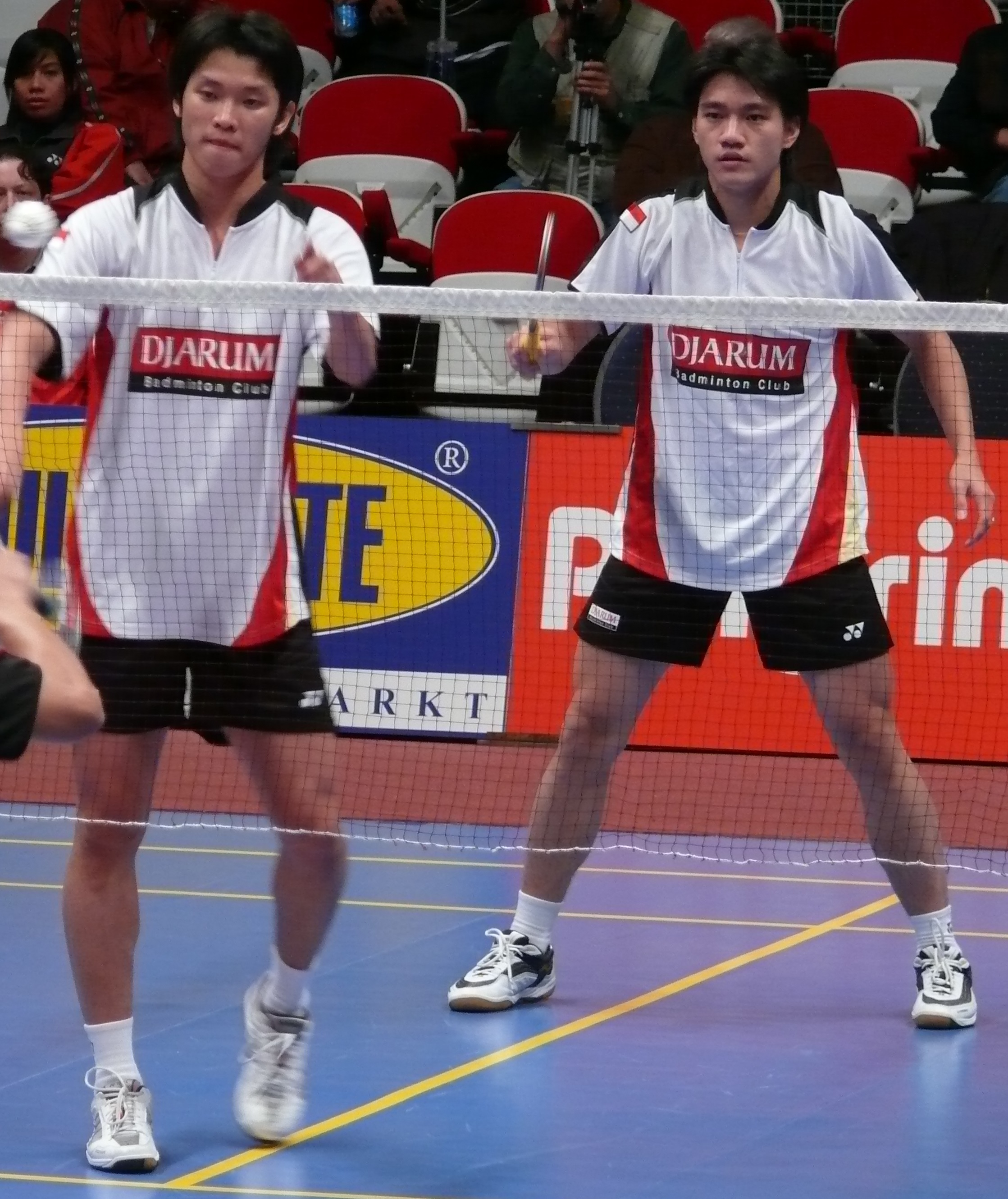
- Fran Kurniawan and Rendra Wijaya

Personal information
- Born: 1 November 1984 (age 42) Cirebon, West Java, Indonesia

Sport
- Country: Indonesia
- Sport: Badminton
- Handedness: Right

Men's and mixed doubles
- Highest ranking: 54 (MD) 21 January 2010; 51 (XD) 21 January 2010
- BWF profile

Rendra Wijaya (born 1 November 1984) is an Indonesian badminton player who specializes in doubles. He joined PB Djarum badminton club in 2007.

== Personal life ==
Wijaya grew in a badminton family. His father, Hendra Wijaya is a former badminton player and owner of Rajawali badminton club in Cirebon. His brothers, Indra and Candra are former Indonesian badminton player and part of the Indonesia national badminton team at the 1996 and 1998 Thomas Cup. Her sister, Sandrawati Wijaya also a badminton player. He married Fransisca Carollim in 2011.

== Career ==
Wijaya won his first international tournament at the 2008 Spanish Open in the men's and mixed doubles event. Together with his partner in the men's doubles, Fran Kurniawan, he also won 2008 Finnish and Austrian International Series tournament. At the 2008 Indonesia International Challenge, he and Kurniawan won the men's doubles title after beat their compatriot Windarto and Wirawan in the straight games with the score 21–18, 21–13. In the Grand Prix level, he and Kurniawan won their first title at the Dutch Open tournament. In the final round they won in straight games to Indian paired. Teamed-up with Rian Sukmawan he won the 2011 White Nights and Indonesia International Challenge tournament.

== Achievements ==
=== BWF Grand Prix ===
The BWF Grand Prix has two level such as Grand Prix and Grand Prix Gold. It is a series of badminton tournaments, sanctioned by Badminton World Federation (BWF) since 2007.

Men's Doubles
Year	Tournament	Partner	Opponent	Score	Result
2008	Vietnam Open	(Indonesia) Fran Kurniawan	(Malaysia) Choong Tan Fook (Malaysia) Lee Wan Wah	14-21, 10–21	(silver) Runner-up
2008	Dutch Open	(Indonesia) Fran Kurniawan	(India) Rupesh Kumar K. T. (India) Sanave Thomas	21-18, 21–18	(gold) Winner
2008	Bulgaria Open	(Indonesia) Fran Kurniawan	(Denmark) Mathias Boe (Denmark) Carsten Mogensen	23-25, 16–21	(silver) Runner-up

BWF Grand Prix Gold tournament
BWF Grand Prix tournament

=== BWF International Challenge/Series ===
Men's doubles
Year	Tournament	Partner	Opponent	Score	Result
2011	Indonesia International	(Indonesia) Rian Sukmawan	(Malaysia) Ow Yao Han (Malaysia) Tan Wee Kiong	21-13, 19–21, 21–16	(gold) Winner
2011	White Nights	(Indonesia) Rian Sukmawan	(Indonesia) Fernando Kurniawan (Indonesia) Wifqi Windarto	14-21, 21–13, 21–12	(gold) Winner
2008	Indonesia International	(Indonesia) Fran Kurniawan	(Indonesia) Wifqi Windarto (Indonesia) Afiat Yuris Wirawan	21-18, 21–13	(gold) Winner
2008	Austrian International	(Indonesia) Fran Kurniawan	(Belgium) Wouter Claes (Belgium) Frédéric Mawet	21-14, 21–11	(gold) Winner
2008	Finnish International	(Indonesia) Fran Kurniawan	(Denmark) Jacob Chemnitz (Denmark) Mikkel Delbo Larsen	21-19, 11–21, 21–14	(gold) Winner
2008	Spanish Open	(Indonesia) Fran Kurniawan	(Poland) Adam Cwalina (Poland) Wojciech Szkudlarczyk	21-11, 21–13	(gold) Winner
2006	Cheers Asian Satellite	(Indonesia) Fran Kurniawan	(Indonesia) Yoga Ukikasah (Indonesia) Yonathan Suryatama Dasuki	19-21, 21–18, 20–22	(silver) Runner-up

Mixed doubles
Year	Tournament	Partner	Opponent	Score	Result
2011	Indonesia International	(Indonesia) Maria Elfira Christina	(Indonesia) Andhika Anhar (Indonesia) Keshya Nurvita Hanadia	15-21, 19–21	(silver) Runner-up
2008	Le Volant d'Or de Toulouse	(Indonesia) Meiliana Jauhari	(Indonesia) Fran Kurniawan (Indonesia) Shendy Puspa Irawati	18-21, 21–18, 14–21	(silver) Runner-up
2008	Spanish Open	(Indonesia) Meiliana Jauhari	(Belgium) Wouter Claes (Belgium) Nathalie Descamps	21-14, 21–18	(gold) Winner

BWF International Challenge tournament
BWF International Series tournament
BWF Future Series tournament
