= Emelie Fabbeke =

Swedish badminton player (born 1986)

Personal information
- Born: Emelie Lennartsson; 29 July 1986 (age 39) Karlskrona, Sweden

Sport
- Country: Sweden
- Sport: Badminton

Women's & mixed doubles
- Highest ranking: 21 (WD 19 May 2011); 41 (XD 2 April 2015)
- BWF profile

Emelie Fabbeke (born 29 July 1986 as Emelie Lennartsson) is a Swedish badminton player.

== Achievements ==
=== BWF Grand Prix ===
The BWF Grand Prix had two levels, the Grand Prix and Grand Prix Gold. It was a series of badminton tournaments sanctioned by the Badminton World Federation (BWF) and played between 2007 and 2017.

Women's doubles

Year	Tournament	Partner	Opponent	Score	Result
2011	Bitburger Open	(Sweden) Emma Wengberg	(Japan) Mizuki Fujii (Japan) Reika Kakiiwa	8–21, 11–21	(silver) Runner-up

BWF Grand Prix Gold tournament
BWF Grand Prix tournament

=== BWF International Challenge/Series ===
Women's doubles

Year	Tournament	Partner	Opponent	Score	Result
2008	Slovenian International	(Sweden) Emma Wengberg	(Germany) Claudia Vogelgsang (Finland) Nina Weckström	21–9, 21–11	(gold) Winner
2008	Bulgarian International	(Sweden) Emma Wengberg	(Russia) Valeria Sorokina (Russia) Nina Vislova	16–21, 6–21	(silver) Runner-up
2008	Norwegian International	(Sweden) Emma Wengberg	(Russia) Irina Khlebko (Russia) Anastasia Russkikh	18–21, 23–21, 16–21	(silver) Runner-up
2008	Scotland International	(Sweden) Emma Wengberg	(England) Mariana Agathangelou (Scotland) Jillie Cooper	17–21, 13–21	(silver) Runner-up
2008	Italian International	(Sweden) Emma Wengberg	(Russia) Valeria Sorokina (Russia) Nina Vislova	21–23, 14–21	(silver) Runner-up
2009	Swedish International	(Sweden) Emma Wengberg	(Netherlands) Rachel van Cutsen (Netherlands) Paulien van Dooremalen	22–20, 19–21, 20–22	(silver) Runner-up
2009	Portugal International	(Sweden) Emma Wengberg	(Finland) Sanni Rautala (Finland) Noora Virta	21–10, 20–22, 21–12	(gold) Winner
2009	Turkey International	(Sweden) Emma Wengberg	(Turkey) Özge Bayrak (Turkey) Li Shuang	21–11, 21–9	(gold) Winner
2010	Spanish Open	(Sweden) Emma Wengberg	(Netherlands) Lotte Jonathans (Netherlands) Paulien van Dooremalen	21–16, 21–19	(gold) Winner
2011	Scottish International	(Sweden) Emma Wengberg	(Malaysia) Ng Hui Ern (Malaysia) Ng Hui Lin	21–7, 21–13	(gold) Winner
2013	Swedish Masters	(Sweden) Emma Wengberg	(Netherlands) Selena Piek (Netherlands) Iris Tabeling	15–21, 16–21	(silver) Runner-up
2013	Denmark International	(Sweden) Emma Wengberg	(Denmark) Line Damkjær Kruse (Denmark) Marie Røpke	20–22, 11–21	(silver) Runner-up
2013	Swiss International	(Sweden) Emma Wengberg	(Russia) Anastasia Chervaykova (Russia) Nina Vislova	18–21, 21–18, 13–21	(silver) Runner-up
2014	Irish Open	(Denmark) Lena Grebak	(Denmark) Julie Finne-Ipsen (Denmark) Rikke Søby Hansen	21–16, 21–14	(gold) Winner

Mixed doubles

Year	Tournament	Partner	Opponent	Score	Result
2014	Czech International	(Sweden) Jonatan Nordh	(Russia) Anatoliy Yartsev (Russia) Evgeniya Kosetskaya	18–21, 21–19, 21–19	(gold) Winner
2015	Belgian International	(Sweden) Jonatan Nordh	(Poland) Robert Mateusiak (Poland) Nadieżda Zięba	21–15, 6–21, 8–21	(silver) Runner-up

BWF International Challenge tournament
BWF International Series tournament
BWF Future Series tournament
