= Ilse Vaessen =

Dutch badminton player

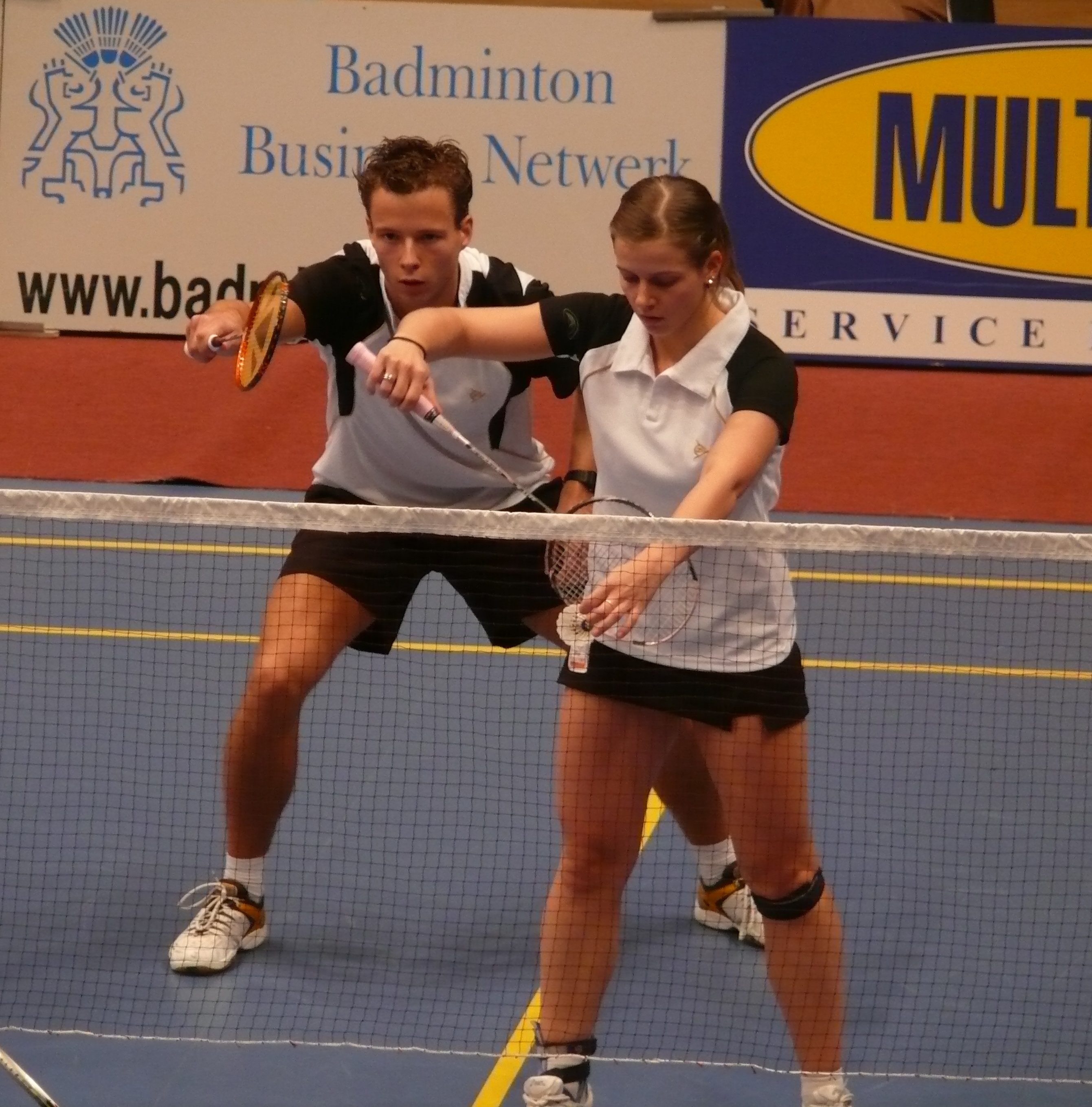
- Jorrit de Ruiter and Ilse Vaessen at the Dutch Open 2007

Personal information
- Born: 15 April 1986 (age 40) Arnhem, Netherlands

Sport
- Country: Netherlands
- Sport: Badminton
- Handedness: Right

Women's & mixed doubles
- Highest ranking: 51 (WD, 21 January 2010); 37 (XD, 8 October 2009)
- BWF profile
Medal record
Women's badminton
Representing Netherlands
European Women's Team Championships
Silver medal – second place	2008 Almere	Women's team
Bronze medal – third place	2012 Amsterdam	Women's team

Ilse Vaessen (born 15 April 1986) is a Dutch badminton player. Her international career has been hindered by a severe knee injury. She now is the manager of the "topbadminton" department of the Dutch Badminton Association "Badminton Nederland". She used to play at the highest level club team competition in doubles for her club BV Almere in the Dutch Eredivisie (Premier Division).

== Achievements ==
=== BWF International Challenge/Series ===
Women's doubles
Year	Tournament	Partner	Opponent	Score	Result
2008	Welsh International	(Netherlands) Rachel van Cutsen	(England) Mariana Agathangelou (Scotland) Jillie Cooper	21–17, 19–21, 16–21	(silver) Runner-up
2012	Estonian International	(Netherlands) Samantha Barning	(Netherlands) Selena Piek (Netherlands) Iris Tabeling	15–21, 21–13, 10–21	(silver) Runner-up

Mixed doubles
Year	Tournament	Partner	Opponent	Score	Result
2007	Welsh International	(Netherlands) Jorrit de Ruiter	(Poland) Adam Cwalina (Poland) Małgorzata Kurdelska	16–21, 19–21	(silver) Runner-up
2008	Welsh International	(Netherlands) Jorrit de Ruiter	(Scotland) Watson Briggs (Scotland) Jillie Cooper	19–21, 18–21	(silver) Runner-up
2011	Estonian International	(Germany) Tim Dettmann	(Netherlands) Jacco Arends (Netherlands) Selena Piek	12–21, 14–21	(silver) Runner-up
2012	Croatian International	(Netherlands) Jacco Arends	(Croatia) Zvonimir Đurkinjak (Croatia) Staša Poznanović	22–20, 17–21, 21–16	(gold) Winner
2012	Irish Open	(Netherlands) Jacco Arends	(Netherlands) Jorrit de Ruiter (Netherlands) Samantha Barning	20–22, 17–21	(silver) Runner-up

BWF International Challenge tournament
BWF International Series tournament
BWF Future Series tournament
