= Maria Elfira Christina =

Indonesian badminton player (born 1986)

Personal information
- Born: 21 October 1986 (age 40) Purwodadi, Central Java, Indonesia
- Height: 1. 60 m

Sport
- Country: Indonesia
- Sport: Badminton
- Handedness: Right
- Event: Women's singles & doubles

Women's singles & doubles
- BWF profile
Medal record
Women's badminton
Representing Indonesia
Asian Junior Championships
Bronze medal – third place	2004 Hwacheon	Girls' team

Maria Elfira Christina (born 21 October 1986) is a former Indonesian badminton player affiliated with Djarum club. She was part of the Indonesian junior team that won the bronze medal at the 2004 Asian Junior Championships in the girls' team event. Christina was the champion of the 2008 Spanish Open in the singles event. In the national event, she has collected five titles at the National circuit tournament. She is now works as a coach at the PB Djarum.

== Achievements ==
=== BWF International Challenge/Series ===
Women's singles
Year	Tournament	Opponent	Score	Result
2006	Brazil International	(Indonesia) Maria Febe Kusumastuti	15–21, 18–21	(silver) Runner-up
2007	Vietnam International	(England) Tracey Hallam	15–21, 15–21	(silver) Runner-up
2008	Spanish Open	(India) Neha Pandit	21–16, 21–4	(gold) Winner
2009	Vietnam International	(Thailand) Ratchanok Intanon	18–21, 14–21	(silver) Runner-up
2009	Indonesia International	(Indonesia) Fransisca Ratnasari	12–21, 19–21	(silver) Runner-up

Mixed doubles
Year	Tournament	Partner	Opponent	Score	Result
2011	Indonesia International	(Indonesia) Rendra Wijaya	(Indonesia) Andhika Anhar (Indonesia) Keshya Nurvita Hanadia	15–21, 19–21	(silver) Runner-up

BWF International Challenge tournament
BWF International Series tournament
