= Zhang Yi (badminton) =

Chinese badminton player

Zhang Yi 张翼
Personal information
- Born: 16 May 1980 (age 46) Guangdong, China
- Height: 1.84 m (6 ft 0 in)

Sport
- Country: China
- Sport: Badminton
- Handedness: Right
- Event: Men's & mixed doubles

Men's & mixed doubles
- BWF profile
Medal record
Men's badminton
Representing China
Asian Junior Championships
Gold medal – first place	1998 Kuala Lumpur	Boys' team
Gold medal – first place	1997 Manila	Boys' team
Silver medal – second place	1997 Manila	Boys' doubles

Zhang Yi (Chinese: 张翼, born 16 May 1980) is a former Chinese badminton player. In 1997, he reached the final at the Asian Junior Championships in the boys' doubles event partnered with Cai Yun, beating their compatriots Xia Xuanze and Chen Hong in the semifinals with the straight games, but they lost to Malaysian paired in the final. In 2005, he compete in the men's singles main draw at the All England Open after won three match in the qualification round. Born in Guangdong, Zhang had won the mixed doubles titles at the 2007 Hungarian International, 2008 Austrian and Portugal International, also at the 2009 Estonian International.

Zhang had been a player and coach of the Täby badminton club in Sweden since 2004. He also one of the initiators of the Swedish Chinese Association in badminton. As a Täby player, he clinched the 2006 Swedish National Championships in the men's doubles event partnered with Joakim Andersson.

== Achievements ==
=== Asian Junior Championships ===
Boys' doubles
Year	Venue	Partner	Opponent	Score	Result
1997	Ninoy Aquino Stadium; Manila, Philippines	(China) Cai Yun	(Malaysia) Chan Chong Ming (Malaysia) Jeremy Gan	6–15, 3–15	Silver

=== BWF International Challenge/Series ===
Men's doubles
Year	Tournament	Partner	Opponent	Score	Result
2006	Finnish International	(Sweden) Joakim Andersson	(Denmark) Jonas Rasmussen (Denmark) Peter Steffensen	9–21, 10–21	(silver) Runner-up

Mixed doubles
Year	Tournament	Partner	Opponent	Score	Result
2009	Estonian International	(China) Cai Jiani	(Russia) Andrey Ashmarin (Russia) Ksenia Polikarpova	21–9, 21–14	(gold) Winner
2008	Portugal International	(China) Cai Jiani	(England) Chris Adcock (England) Gabrielle White	21–14, 21–11	(gold) Winner
2008	Austrian International	(China) Cai Jiani	(Belgium) Wouter Claes (Belgium) Nathalie Descamps	21–18, 21–18	(gold) Winner
2007	Hungarian International	(China) Cai Jiani	(Denmark) Mads Pieler Kolding (Denmark) Line Damkjaer Kruse	21–15, 21–17	(gold) Winner
