= Rachel van Cutsen =

Dutch badminton player (born 1984)

Personal information
- Born: 8 July 1984 (age 42) Spijkenisse, Netherlands
- Height: 1.79 m (5 ft 10 in)

Sport
- Country: Netherlands
- Sport: Badminton
- Handedness: Right

Women's singles & doubles
- Highest ranking: 34 (WS 8 April 2010); 25 (WD 21 January 2010)
- BWF profile
Medal record
Women's badminton
Representing Netherlands
Uber Cup
Silver medal – second place	2006 Sendai & Tokyo	Women's team
European Women's Team Championships
Gold medal – first place	2006 Thessalonica	Women's team
Silver medal – second place	2008 Almere	Women's team

Rachel van Cutsen (born 8 July 1984) is a former right-handed Dutch badminton player. A native of Spijkenisse, she could play either in singles or in doubles matches. She was part of the Dutch national women's team that won silver at the 2006 Uber Cup.

== Achievements ==
=== BWF International Challenge/Series/European Circuit ===
Women's singles
Year	Tournament	Opponent	Score	Result
2007	Czech International	(England) Elizabeth Cann	21–10, 22–20	(gold) Winner
2008	Welsh International	(Estonia) Kati Tolmoff	20–22, 21–18, 13–21	(silver) Runner-up
2009	Europe Circuit Finals	(Germany) Juliane Schenk	24–22, 21–17	(gold) Winner
2009	Norwegian International	(Germany) Juliane Schenk	12–21, 21–19, 11–21	(silver) Runner-up
2009	Irish International	(Spain) Carolina Marín	24–22, 14–21, 16–21	(silver) Runner-up

Women's doubles
Year	Tournament	Partner	Opponent	Score	Result
2005	Iceland International	(Netherlands) Paulien van Dooremalen	(Sweden) Elin Bergblom (Sweden) Johanna Persson	14–17, 11–15	(silver) Runner-up
2007	Finnish International	(Netherlands) Paulien van Dooremalen	(Denmark) Christinna Pedersen (Denmark) Mie Schjøtt-Kristensen	21–19, 10–21, 11–21	(silver) Runner-up
2007	Dutch International	(Netherlands) Paulien van Dooremalen	(France) Elodie Eymard (France) Weny Rahmawati	21–11, 21–8	(gold) Winner
2008	Le Volant d'Or de Toulouse	(Netherlands) Paulien van Dooremalen	(Indonesia) Shendy Puspa Irawati (Indonesia) Meiliana Jauhari	15–21, 10–21	(silver) Runner-up
2008	Belgian International	(Netherlands) Paulien van Dooremalen	(Russia) Valeria Sorokina (Russia) Nina Vislova	10–21, 12–21	(silver) Runner-up
2008	Welsh International	(Netherlands) Ilse Vaessen	(England) Mariana Agathangelou (Scotland) Jillie Cooper	21–17, 19–21, 16–21	(silver) Runner-up
2009	Swedish International	(Netherlands) Paulien van Dooremalen	(Sweden) Emelie Lennartsson (Sweden) Emma Wengberg	20–22, 21–19, 22–20	(gold) Winner
2009	Polish International	(Netherlands) Paulien van Dooremalen	(Bulgaria) Diana Dimova (Bulgaria) Petya Nedelcheva	18–21, 21–14, 16–21	(silver) Runner-up
2009	Europe Circuit Finals	(Netherlands) Paulien van Dooremalen	(Sweden) Emelie Lennartsson (Sweden) Emma Wengberg	18–21, 19–21	(silver) Runner-up

BWF International Challenge tournament
BWF International Series tournament
