= Tim Dettmann =

German badminton player (born 1982)

Personal information
- Born: 10 May 1982 (age 44) Berlin, Germany

Sport
- Country: Germany
- Sport: Badminton

Men's & mixed doubles
- Highest ranking: 84 (MD 22 October 2009); 131 (XD 9 September 2010)
- BWF profile
Medal record
Men's badminton
Representing Germany
European Junior Championships
Gold medal – first place	2001 Spała	Mixed team

Tim Dettmann (born 10 May 1982) is a German badminton player. At the 2006/07 European Circuit, he won the Bulgarian and Finnish International tournaments and became the runner-up at the Poland in the mixed doubles event. He also the runner-up at the Turkey, Finnish, and Polish International tournaments in the men's doubles event. In 2011, he became the runner-up at the Estonian International tournament in the mixed doubles event partnered with Ilse Vaessen of Netherlands.

== Achievements ==
=== BWF International Challenge/Series ===
Men's doubles
Year	Tournament	Partner	Opponent	Score	Result
2007	Turkey International	(Germany) Johannes Schöttler	(Germany) Kristof Hopp (Germany) Ingo Kindervater	21–12, 18–21, 20–22	(silver) Runner-up
2007	Finnish International	(Germany) Johannes Schöttler	(Belgium) Wouter Claes (Belgium) Frédéric Mawet	16–21, 16–21	(silver) Runner-up
2007	Polish Open	(Germany) Johannes Schöttler	(Denmark) Jacob Chemnitz (Denmark) Mikkel Delbo Larsen	21–14, 17–21, 19–21	(silver) Runner-up

Mixed doubles
Year	Tournament	Partner	Opponent	Score	Result
2006	Bulgarian International	(Germany) Annekatrin Lillie	(Russia) Anton Nazarenko (Russia) Elena Chernyavskaya	21–15, 21–16	(gold) Winner
2007	Finnish International	(Germany) Annekatrin Lillie	(Denmark) Rasmus Mangor Andersen (Russia) Anastasia Russkikh	16–21, 25–23, 21–17	(gold) Winner
2007	Polish Open	(Germany) Annekatrin Lillie	(Poland) Robert Mateusiak (Poland) Nadieżda Kostiuczyk	19–21, 21–17, 19–21	(silver) Runner-up
2011	Estonian International	(Netherlands) Ilse Vaessen	(Netherlands) Jacco Arends (Netherlands) Selena Piek	12–21, 14–21	(silver) Runner-up

BWF International Challenge tournament
BWF International Series tournament
