= Paulien van Dooremalen =

Dutch badminton player (born 1985)

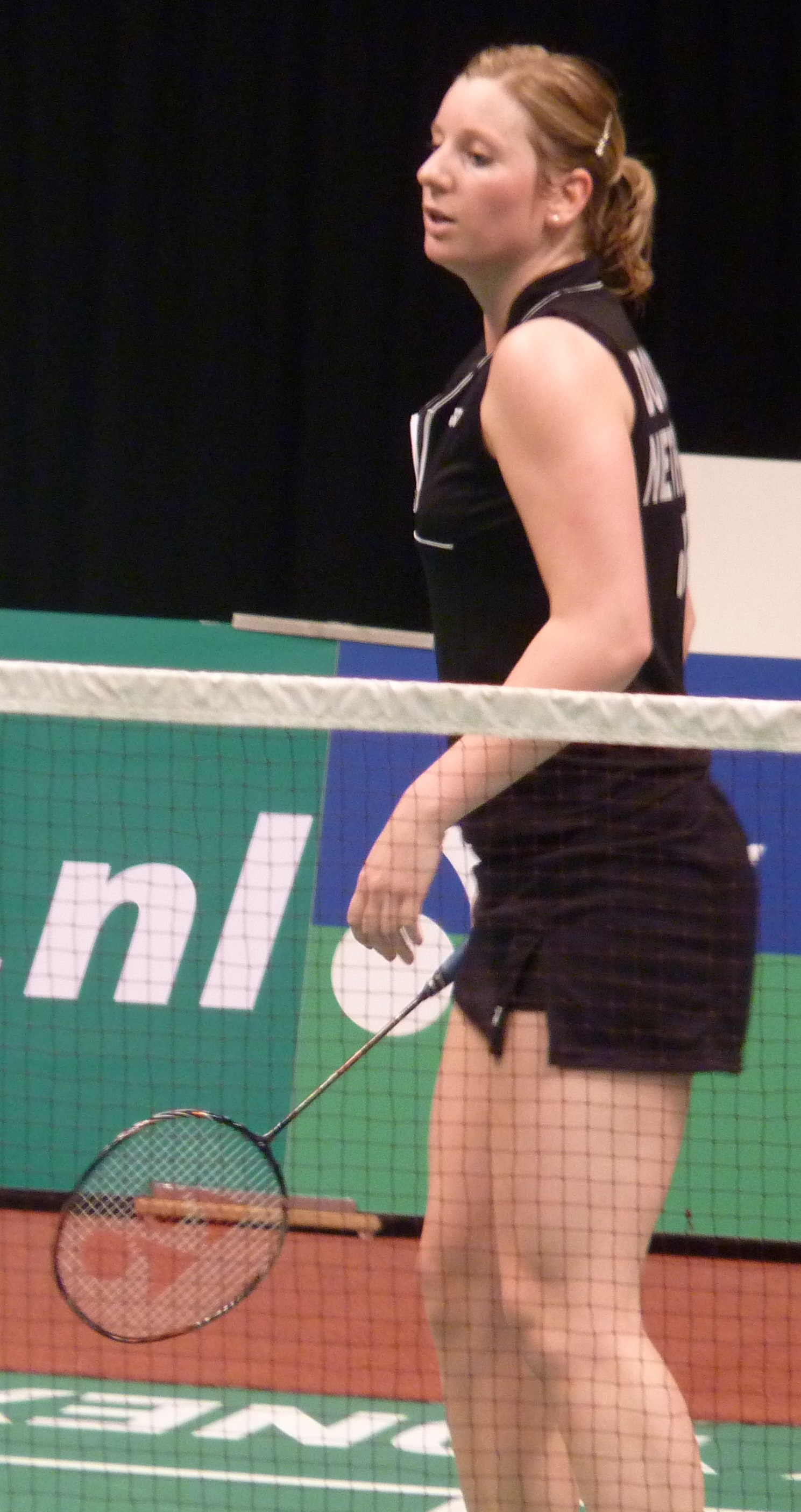

Personal information
- Born: 4 July 1985 (age 41) Deventer, Netherlands
- Height: 1.70 m (5 ft 7 in)

Sport
- Country: Netherlands
- Sport: Badminton
- Handedness: Right

Women's & mixed doubles
- Highest ranking: 10 (WD 2 December 2010); 23 (XD 15 October 2009)
- BWF profile
Medal record
Women's badminton
Representing Netherlands
Uber Cup
Silver medal – second place	2006 Sendai & Tokyo	Women's team
European Women's Team Championships
Gold medal – first place	2006 Thessalonica	Women's team
Silver medal – second place	2008 Almere	Women's team
Bronze medal – third place	2012 Amsterdam	Women's team

Paulien van Dooremalen (born 4 July 1985) is a Dutch former badminton player from Duinwijck and she also played for the Badminton Club Amersfoort. She currently resides in Arnhem and was a doubles specialist. She also featured in the Netherlands women's team that won the 2006 European Women's Team Championships, and also the silver medal at the world women's team championships, 2006 Uber Cup in Japan. She won the Dutch National Mixed doubles title in 2008 with Ruud Bosch. She also won the National Women's doubles twice in 2010 and 2011 with Lotte Jonathans.

== Personal life ==
She is the daughter of the former Netherlands national badminton coach and director Martijn van Dooremalen.

== Achievements ==
=== BWF Grand Prix ===
The BWF Grand Prix had two levels, the Grand Prix and Grand Prix Gold. It was a series of badminton tournaments sanctioned by the Badminton World Federation (BWF) and played between 2007 and 2017.

Women's doubles
Year	Tournament	Partner	Opponent	Score	Result
2010	Bitburger Open	(Netherlands) Lotte Jonathans	(China) Pan Pan (China) Tian Qing	7–21, 10–21	(silver) Runner-up

Mixed doubles
Year	Tournament	Partner	Opponent	Score	Result
2009	Bitburger Open	(Netherlands) Ruud Bosch	(Denmark) Mikkel Delbo Larsen (Denmark) Mie Schjoett-Kristensen	17–21, 16–21	(silver) Runner-up

BWF Grand Prix Gold tournament
BWF Grand Prix tournament

=== BWF International Challenge/Series/European Circuit ===
Women's doubles
Year	Tournament	Partner	Opponent	Score	Result
2005	Finnish International	(Netherlands) Brenda Beenhakker	(Germany) Sandra Marinello (Germany) Kathrin Piotrowski	11–15, 1–15	(silver) Runner-up
2005	Iceland International	(Netherlands) Rachel van Cutsen	(Sweden) Elin Bergblom (Sweden) Johanna Persson	14–17, 11–15	(silver) Runner-up
2007	Finnish International	(Netherlands) Rachel van Cutsen	(Denmark) Christinna Pedersen (Denmark) Mie Schjøtt-Kristensen	21–19, 10–21, 11–21	(silver) Runner-up
2007	Dutch International	(Netherlands) Rachel van Cutsen	(France) Elodie Eymard (France) Weny Rahmawati	21–11, 21–8	(gold) Winner
2008	Le Volant d'Or de Toulouse	(Netherlands) Rachel van Cutsen	(Indonesia) Shendy Puspa Irawati (Indonesia) Meiliana Jauhari	15–21, 10–21	(silver) Runner-up
2008	Belgian International	(Netherlands) Rachel van Cutsen	(Russia) Valeria Sorokina (Russia) Nina Vislova	10–21, 12–21	(silver) Runner-up
2008	Irish International	(Netherlands) Patty Stolzenbach	(Denmark) Helle Nielsen (Denmark) Marie Røpke	25–23, 17–21, 8–21	(silver) Runner-up
2009	Swedish International	(Netherlands) Rachel van Cutsen	(Sweden) Emelie Lennartsson (Sweden) Emma Wengberg	20–22, 21–19, 22–20	(gold) Winner
2009	Polish International	(Netherlands) Rachel van Cutsen	(Bulgaria) Diana Dimova (Bulgaria) Petya Nedelcheva	18–21, 21–14, 16–21	(silver) Runner-up
2009	Europe Circuit Finals	(Netherlands) Rachel van Cutsen	(Sweden) Emelie Lennartsson (Sweden) Emma Wengberg	18–21, 19–21	(silver) Runner-up
2010	Swedish International	(Netherlands) Lotte Jonathans	(Denmark) Helle Nielsen (Denmark) Marie Røpke	21–17, 15–21, 18–21	(silver) Runner-up
2010	Spanish International	(Netherlands) Lotte Jonathans	(Sweden) Emelie Lennartsson (Sweden) Emma Wengberg	16–21, 19–21	(silver) Runner-up
2010	Belgian International	(Netherlands) Lotte Jonathans	(Germany) Sandra Marinello (Germany) Birgit Overzier	19–21, 21–18, 12–21	(silver) Runner-up
2010	Norwegian International	(Netherlands) Lotte Jonathans	(Germany) Sandra Marinello (Germany) Birgit Overzier	21–14, 21–15	(gold) Winner
2011	Dutch International	(Netherlands) Lotte Jonathans	(Russia) Valeria Sorokina (Russia) Nina Vislova	22–24, 12–21	(silver) Runner-up
2011	Spanish International	(Netherlands) Lotte Jonathans	(Canada) Nicole Grether (Canada) Charmaine Reid	12–21, 21–18, 21–14	(gold) Winner
2011	Norwegian International	(Netherlands) Lotte Jonathans	(United States) Eva Lee (United States) Paula Lynn Obañana	21–17, 6–21, 13–21	(silver) Runner-up
2012	Dutch International	(Netherlands) Lotte Jonathans	(Netherlands) Selena Piek (Netherlands) Iris Tabeling	17–21, 21–19, 23–21	(gold) Winner

Mixed doubles
Year	Tournament	Partner	Opponent	Score	Result
2006	Dutch International	(Belgium) Wouter Claes	(Germany) Kristof Hopp (Germany) Birgit Overzier	18–21, 18–21	(silver) Runner-up

BWF International Challenge tournament
BWF International Series tournament
