= Johannes Schöttler =

German badminton player (born 1984)

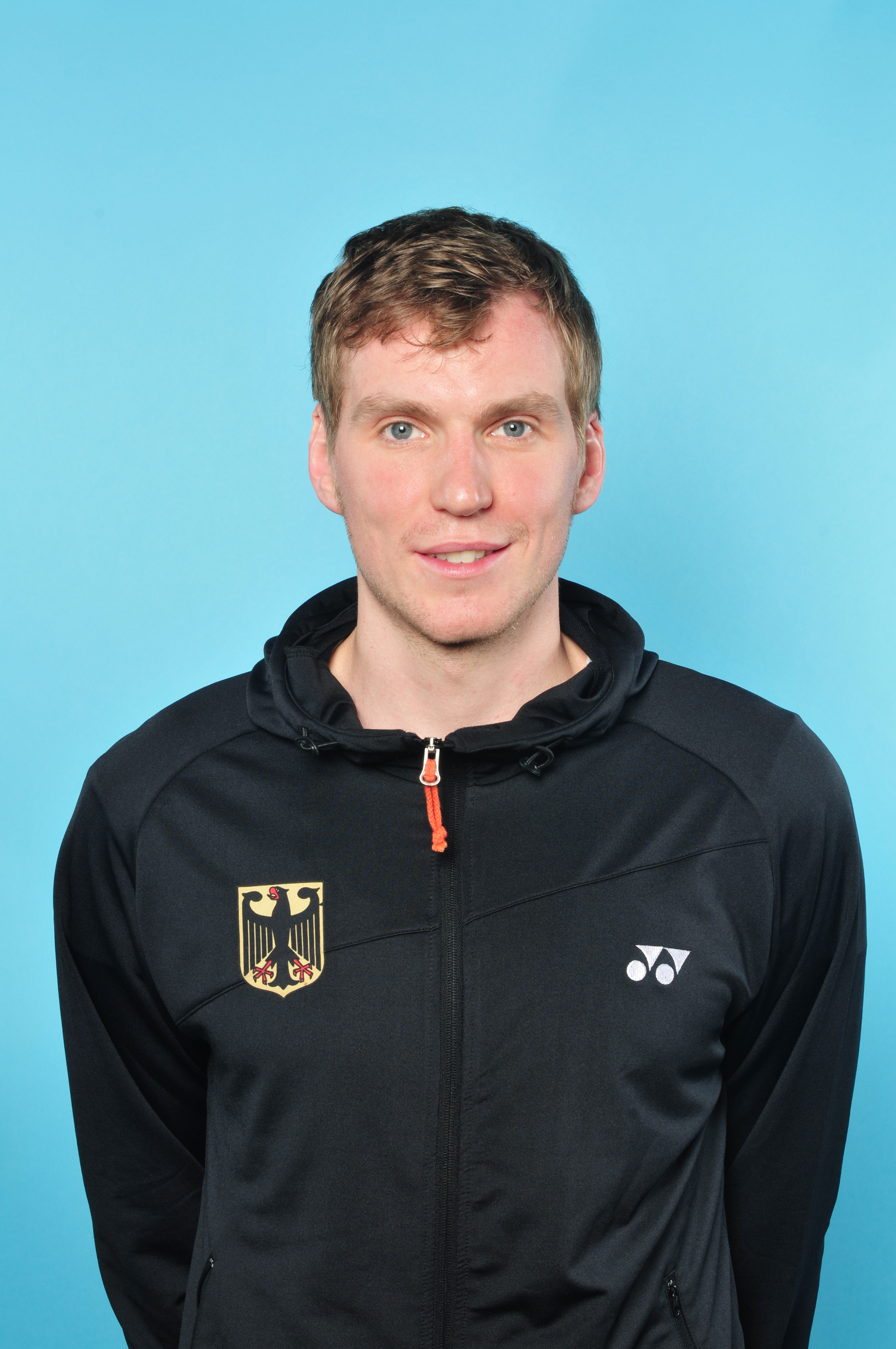

Personal information
- Born: 27 August 1984 (age 42) Hamburg, West Germany
- Height: 1.92 m (6 ft 4 in)
- Weight: 84 kg (185 lb)

Sport
- Country: Germany
- Sport: Badminton
- Handedness: Right

Men's & mixed doubles
- Highest ranking: 11 (MD 28 April 2011); 24 (XD 21 January 2010)
- BWF profile
Medal record
Men's badminton
Representing Germany
European Mixed Team Championships
Gold medal – first place	2013 Moscow	Mixed team
Silver medal – second place	2011 Amsterdam	Mixed team
Bronze medal – third place	2015 Leuven	Mixed team
Bronze medal – third place	2017 Lubin	Mixed team
European Men's Team Championships
Silver medal – second place	2012 Amsterdam	Men's team
Bronze medal – third place	2008 Almere	Men's team
Bronze medal – third place	2010 Warsaw	Men's team
Bronze medal – third place	2014 Basel	Men's team
Bronze medal – third place	2016 Kazan	Men's team

Johannes Schöttler (also spelled Schoettler, born 27 August 1984) is a German badminton player. He competed for Germany in the men's doubles at the 2012 Summer Olympics with Ingo Kindervater and 2016 Summer Olympics with Michael Fuchs.

== Achievements ==
=== BWF Superseries ===
The BWF Superseries, which was launched on 14 December 2006 and implemented in 2007, was a series of elite badminton tournaments, sanctioned by the Badminton World Federation (BWF). BWF Superseries levels were Superseries and Superseries Premier. A season of Superseries consisted of twelve tournaments around the world that had been introduced since 2011. Successful players were invited to the Superseries Finals, which were held at the end of each year.

Men's doubles
Year	Tournament	Partner	Opponent	Score	Result
2010	French Open	(Germany) Ingo Kindervater	(Denmark) Mathias Boe (Denmark) Carsten Mogensen	15–21, 9–21	(silver) Runner-up

BWF Super Series Finals tournament
BWF Super Series Premier tournament
BWF Super Series tournament

=== BWF Grand Prix ===
The BWF Grand Prix had two levels, the Grand Prix and Grand Prix Gold. It was a series of badminton tournaments sanctioned by the Badminton World Federation (BWF) and played between 2007 and 2017.

Men's doubles
Year	Tournament	Partner	Opponent	Score	Result
2008	Bitburger Open	(Germany) Kristof Hopp	(Denmark) Mathias Boe (Denmark) Carsten Mogensen	11–21, 15–21	(silver) Runner-up
2009	Dutch Open	(Germany) Kristof Hopp	(Germany) Michael Fuchs (Germany) Ingo Kindervater	21–15, 21–16	(gold) Winner
2010	Bitburger Open	(Germany) Ingo Kindervater	(Denmark) Mathias Boe (Denmark) Carsten Mogensen	16–21, 16–21	(silver) Runner-up
2011	Dutch Open	(Germany) Ingo Kindervater	(Poland) Adam Cwalina (Poland) Michał Łogosz	19–21, 21–19, 14–21	(silver) Runner-up
2012	Bitburger Open	(Germany) Ingo Kindervater	(England) Chris Langridge (England) Peter Mills	21–15, 21–11	(gold) Winner
2015	Scottish Open	(Germany) Michael Fuchs	(England) Andrew Ellis (England) Peter Mills	21–15, 21–18	(gold) Winner
2016	Bitburger Open	(Germany) Michael Fuchs	(Malaysia) Ong Yew Sin (Malaysia) Teo Ee Yi	16–21, 18–21	(silver) Runner up

BWF Grand Prix Gold tournament
BWF Grand Prix tournament

=== BWF International Challenge/Series ===
Men's doubles
Year	Tournament	Partner	Opponent	Score	Result
2007	Finnish International	(Germany) Tim Dettmann	(Belgium) Wouter Claes (Belgium) Frédéric Mawet	16–21, 16–21	(silver) Runner-up
2007	Polish Open	(Germany) Tim Dettmann	(Denmark) Jacob Chemnitz (Denmark) Mikkel Delbo Larsen	21–14, 17–21, 19–21	(silver) Runner-up
2007	Turkey International	(Germany) Tim Dettmann	(Germany) Kristof Hopp (Germany) Ingo Kindervater	21–12, 18–21, 20–22	(silver) Runner-up
2008	Italian International	(Germany) Kristof Hopp	(Chinese Taipei) Chen Hung-ling (Chinese Taipei) Lin Yu-lang	22–20, 21–13	(gold) Winner
2009	Norwegian International	(Germany) Kristof Hopp	(Denmark) Rasmus Bonde (Denmark) Simon Mollyhus	21–18, 17–21, 19–21	(silver) Runner-up
2010	Belgian International	(Germany) Ingo Kindervater	(Germany) Michael Fuchs (Germany) Oliver Roth	Walkover	(gold) Winner
2010	Norwegian International	(Germany) Ingo Kindervater	(England) Marcus Ellis (England) Peter Mills	21–17, 23–21	(gold) Winner
2011	Morocco International	(Germany) Ingo Kindervater	(Germany) Michael Fuchs (Germany) Oliver Roth	21–15, 21–19	(gold) Winner
2012	Irish Open	(Germany) Josche Zurwonne	(Netherlands) Jacco Arends (Netherlands) Jelle Maas	14–21, 19–21	(silver) Runner-up
2014	Italian International	(Germany) Michael Fuchs	(England) Marcus Ellis (England) Chris Langridge	11–21, 19–21	(silver) Runner-up
2015	Guatemala International	(Germany) Michael Fuchs	(India) Manu Attri (India) B. Sumeeth Reddy	21–17, 21–13	(gold) Winner
2015	USA International	(Germany) Michael Fuchs	(Chinese Taipei) Lin Chia-yu (Chinese Taipei) Wu Hsiao-lin	21–16, 21–23, 19–21	(silver) Runner-up

Mixed doubles
Year	Tournament	Partner	Opponent	Score	Result
2004	Czech International	(Germany) Gitte Köhler	(Denmark) Jesper Thomsen (Denmark) Britta Andersen	1–15, 0–15	(silver) Runner-up
2008	Italian International	(Germany) Birgit Overzier	(Russia) Vitalij Durkin (Russia) Nina Vislova	22–20, 19–21, 18–21	(silver) Runner-up
2009	Dutch International	(Germany) Birgit Overzier	(Denmark) Christian John Skovgaard (Denmark) Anne Skelbæk	21–16, 21–10	(gold) Winner
2010	Belgian International	(Germany) Sandra Marinello	(Germany) Michael Fuchs (Germany) Birgit Overzier	20–22, 19–21	(silver) Runner-up

BWF International Challenge tournament
BWF International Series tournament

== Record against selected opponents ==
Men's doubles results with Ingo Kindervater against Super Series finalists, World Championships semifinalists, and Olympic quarterfinalists, as well as all Olympic opponents.

- (Australia) Ross Smith & Glenn Warfe 1–0
- (China) Cai Yun & Fu Haifeng 0–2
- (China) Chai Biao & Guo Zhendong 0–2
- (China) Liu Xiaolong & Qiu Zihan 0–2
- (Chinese Taipei) Fang Chieh-min & Lee Sheng-mu 0–1
- (Denmark) Mathias Boe & Carsten Mogensen 0–5
- (Denmark) Lars Påske & Jonas Rasmussen 0–1
- (Denmark) Jonas Rasmussen & Mads Conrad-Petersen 1–0
- (Indonesia) Markis Kido & Hendra Setiawan 1–0
- (Indonesia) Mohammad Ahsan & Hendra Setiawan 0–1
- (Japan) Hirokatsu Hashimoto & Noriyasu Hirata 0–4
- (Japan) Hiroyuki Endo & Kenichi Hayakawa 0–3
- (South Korea) Jung Jae-sung & Lee Yong-dae 0–3
- (South Korea) Ko Sung-hyun & Lee Yong-dae 1–2
- (South Korea) Ko Sung-hyun & Yoo Yeon-seong 1–1
- (Malaysia) Mohd Zakry Abdul Latif & Mohd Fairuzizuan Mohd Tazari 0–2
- (Malaysia) Koo Kien Keat & Tan Boon Heong 0–1
- (Thailand) Bodin Isara & Maneepong Jongjit 0–1
