= Mie Schjøtt-Kristensen =

Danish badminton player (born 1984)

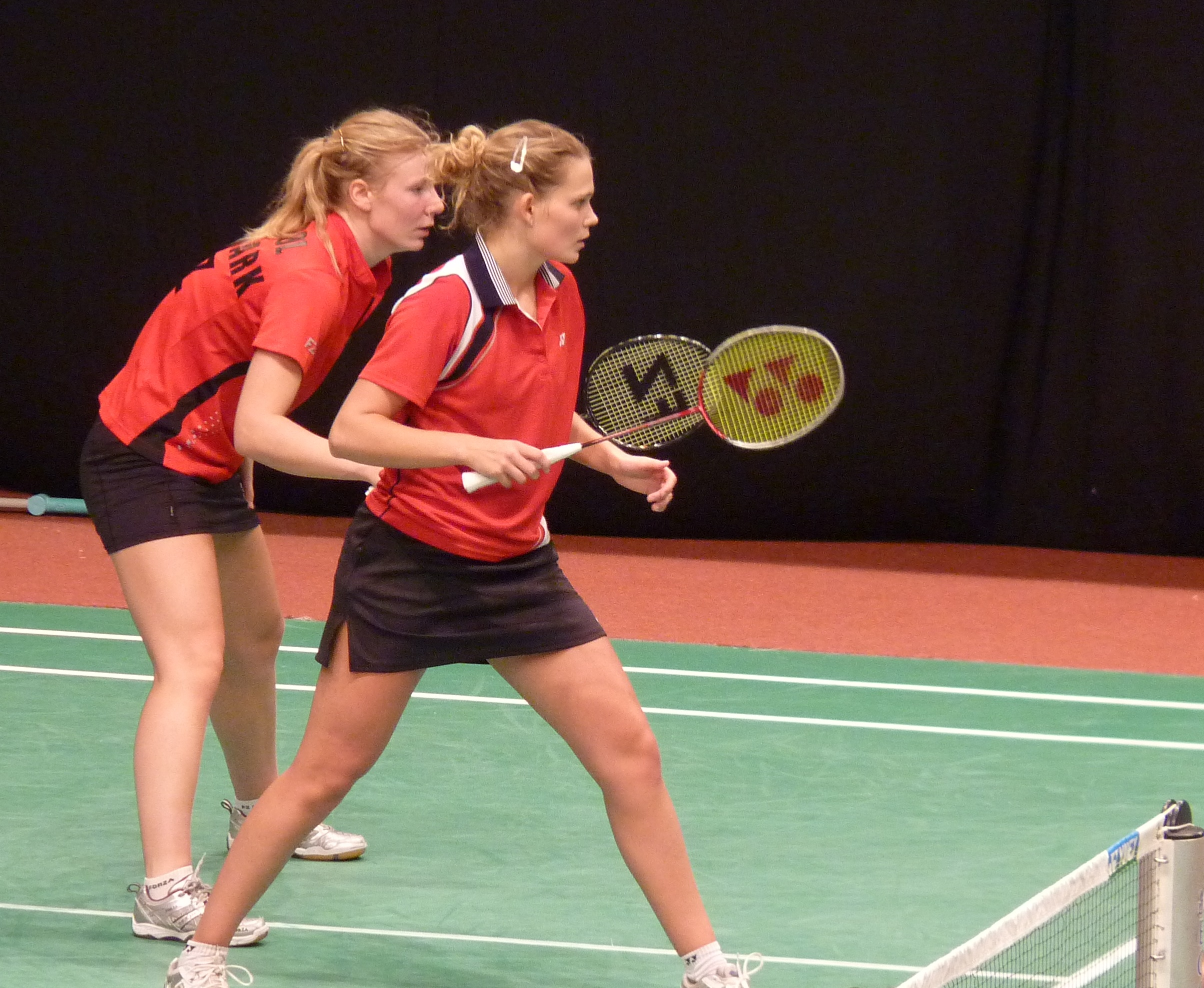
- Line Damkjær Kruse and Mie Schjøtt-Kristensen

Personal information
- Born: 14 May 1984 (age 42) Odense, Denmark

Sport
- Country: Denmark
- Sport: Badminton

Women's & mixed doubles
- Highest ranking: 17 (WD) 21 January 2010; 14 (XD) 15 July 2010
- BWF profile
Medal record
Badminton
Representing Denmark
European Championships
Bronze medal – third place	2010 Manchester	Women's doubles
European Mixed Team Championships
Gold medal – first place	2009 Liverpool	Mixed team
Gold medal – first place	2008 Herning	Mixed team
European Women's Team Championships
Gold medal – first place	2008 Almere	Women's team

Mie Schjøtt-Kristensen (born 14 May 1984) is a Danish badminton player. She started playing badminton at aged six in Brylle club Funen. She moved to train in Copenhagen and join the national team in 2002. She was part of the Danish team that won the gold medals at the 2008, 2009 European Mixed Team Championships, and 2008 Women's Team Championships. She also won the bronze medal at the 2010 European Championships. In June 2011, she decided to quit from the national team.

== Achievements ==
=== European Championships ===
Women's doubles
Year	Venue	Partner	Opponent	Score	Result
2010	Manchester Evening News Arena; Manchester, England	(Denmark) Line Damkjær Kruse	(Russia) Valeria Sorokina (Russia) Nina Vislova	11–21, 16–21	Bronze

=== BWF Grand Prix ===
The BWF Grand Prix has two level such as Grand Prix and Grand Prix Gold. It is a series of badminton tournaments, sanctioned by Badminton World Federation (BWF) since 2007.

Women's doubles
Year	Tournament	Partner	Opponent	Score	Result
2009	Bitburger Open	(Denmark) Line Damkjær Kruse	(Denmark) Helle Nielsen (Denmark) Marie Roepke	21–18, 19–21, 19–21	(silver) Runner-up

Mixed doubles
Year	Tournament	Partner	Opponent	Score	Result
2009	Bitburger Open	(Denmark) Mikkel Delbo Larsen	(Netherlands) Ruud Bosch (Netherlands) Paulien van Dooremalen	21–17, 21–16	(gold) Winner
2006	Bulgaria Open	(Denmark) Mikkel Delbo Larsen	(Russia) Alexandr Nikolaenko (Russia) Nina Vislova	20–22, 20–22	(silver) Runner-up

BWF Grand Prix Gold tournament
BWF Grand Prix tournament

=== BWF International Challenge/Series ===
Women's singles
Year	Tournament	Opponent	Score	Result
2004	Czech International	(Germany) Katja Michalowsky	9–11, 2–11	(silver) Runner-up

Women's doubles
Year	Tournament	Partner	Opponent	Score	Result
2009	Spanish Open	(Denmark) Line Damkjær Kruse	(India) Aparna Balan (India) Shruti Kurien	21–14, 17–21, 21–15	(gold) Winner
2009	Dutch International	(Denmark) Line Damkjær Kruse	(Germany) Sandra Marinello (Germany) Birgit Overzier	21–19, 21–18	(gold) Winner
2007	Czech International	(Denmark) Christinna Pedersen	(Russia) Elena Shimko (Russia) Tatjana Bibik	21–11, 22–20	(gold) Winner
2007	Polish Open	(Denmark) Christinna Pedersen	(Poland) Kamila Augustyn (Poland) Nadieżda Kostiuczyk	17–21, 14–21	(silver) Runner-up
2007	Finnish International	(Denmark) Christinna Pedersen	(Netherlands) Rachel van Cutsen (Netherlands) Paulien van Dooremalen	19–21, 21–10, 21–11	(gold) Winner
2007	Swedish International	(Denmark) Christinna Pedersen	(China) Guo Xin (China) Cai Jiani	13–21, 14–21	(silver) Runner-up
2006	Czech International	(Denmark) Christinna Pedersen	(England) Sarah Bok (England) Rachel Howard	17–21, 21–13, 22–20	(gold) Winner
2004	Czech International	(Denmark) Britta Andersen	(Czech Republic) Markéta Koudelková (Czech Republic) Hana Procházková	15–5, 15–11	(gold) Winner

Mixed doubles
Year	Tournament	Partner	Opponent	Score	Result
2011	Spanish Open	(Denmark) Mikkel Delbo Larsen	(Croatia) Zvonimir Đurkinjak (Croatia) Staša Poznanović	21–17, 21–19	(gold) Winner
2011	Dutch International	(Denmark) Mikkel Delbo Larsen	(Russia) Aleksandr Nikolaenko (Russia) Valeria Sorokina	21–13, 11–12 Retired	(silver) Runner-up
2010	Finnish International	(Denmark) Mikkel Delbo Larsen	(Russia) Andrey Ashmarin (Russia) Anastasia Prokopenko	21–12, 21–18	(gold) Winner
2009	Irish International	(Denmark) Mikkel Delbo Larsen	(England) Robin Middleton (England) Mariana Agathangelou	21–16, 23–21	(gold) Winner
2008	Czech International	(Denmark) Mikkel Delbo Larsen	(Denmark) Rasmus Bonde (Denmark) Helle Nielsen	12–21, 11–21	(silver) Runner-up
2007	Portugal International	(Denmark) Mikkel Delbo Larsen	(Denmark) Rasmus Bonde (Denmark) Christinna Pedersen	12–21, 6–21	(silver) Runner-up
2006	Portugal International	(Denmark) Rasmus Andersen	(Denmark) Rasmus Bonde (Denmark) Christinna Pedersen	21–13, 14–21, 21–18	(gold) Winner

BWF International Challenge tournament
BWF International Series tournament
