= Mikkel Delbo Larsen =

Danish badminton player (born 1985)

Personal information
- Born: 25 February 1985 (age 41)

Sport
- Country: Denmark
- Sport: Badminton

Men's Doubles & Mixed Doubles
- Highest ranking: 28 (MD) 12 Nov 2009; 14 (XD) 15 Jul 2010
- BWF profile
Medal record
European Junior Championships
Gold medal – first place	2003 Esbjerg	Boys' doubles
Silver medal – second place	2003 Esbjerg	Mixed team

Mikkel Delbo Larsen (born 25 February 1985) is a Danish male badminton player.

== Achievements ==
=== European Junior Championships ===
Boys' doubles
Year	Venue	Partner	Opponent	Score	Result
2003	Esbjerg, Denmark	(Denmark) Martin Bille Larsen	(Denmark) Søren Frandsen (Denmark) Mads Hallas	6–15, 15–6, 15–11	Gold

=== BWF Grand Prix ===
The BWF Grand Prix has two level such as Grand Prix and Grand Prix Gold. It is a series of badminton tournaments, sanctioned by Badminton World Federation (BWF) since 2007.

Mixed doubles
Year	Tournament	Partner	Opponent	Score	Result
2009	Bitburger Open	(Denmark) Mie Schjott-Kristensen	(Netherlands) Ruud Bosch (Netherlands) Paulien van Dooremalen	21–17, 21–16	(gold) Winner
2006	Bulgaria Open	(Denmark) Mie Schjott-Kristensen	(Russia) Alexandr Nikolaenko (Russia) Nina Vislova	20–22, 20–22	(silver) Runner-up

BWF Grand Prix Gold tournament
BWF Grand Prix tournament

=== BWF International Challenge/Series ===
Men's doubles
Year	Tournament	Partner	Opponent	Score	Result
2014	Dutch International	(Denmark) Kasper Antonsen	(Denmark) Rasmus Fladberg (Denmark) Emil Holst	21–15, 21–18	(gold) Winner
2009	Spanish International	(Denmark) Rasmus Bonde	(England) Dean George (England) Chris Langridge	26–24, 23–21	(gold) Winner
2009	Finnish International	(Denmark) Rasmus Bonde	(Chinese Taipei) Chen Hung-ling (Chinese Taipei) Lin Yu-lang	19–21, 16–21	(silver) Runner-up
2009	Le Volant d'Or de Toulouse	(Denmark) Rasmus Bonde	(England) Chris Langridge (England) Robin Middleton	11–21, 19–21	(silver) Runner-up
2008	Czech International	(Denmark) Jacob Chemnitz	(Denmark) Kasper Faust Henriksen (Denmark) Christian Skovgaard	16–21, 16–21	(silver) Runner-up
2008	Finnish International	(Denmark) Jacob Chemnitz	(Indonesia) Fran Kurniawan (Indonesia) Rendra Wijaya	19–21, 21–11, 14–21	(silver) Runner-up
2007	Norwegian International	(Denmark) Jacob Chemnitz	(United States) Khan Bob Malaythong (United States) Howard Bach	15–21, 11–21	(silver) Runner-up
2007	Polish Open	(Denmark) Jacob Chemnitz	(Germany) Johannes Schöttler (Germany) Tim Dettmann	14–21, 21–17, 21–19	(gold) Winner
2007	Portugal International	(Denmark) Jacob Chemnitz	(England) Dean George (England) Chris Tonks	21–18, 21–17	(gold) Winner
2006	Cyprus International	(Denmark) Jacob Chemnitz	(France) Mihail Popov (France) Svetoslav Stoyanov	21–14, 21–13	(gold) Winner

Mixed doubles
Year	Tournament	Partner	Opponent	Score	Result
2011	Spanish Open	(Denmark) Mie Schjott-Kristensen	(Croatia) Zvonimir Đurkinjak (Croatia) Staša Poznanović	21–17, 21–19	(gold) Winner
2011	Dutch International	(Denmark) Mie Schjott-Kristensen	(Russia) Aleksandr Nikolaenko (Russia) Valeria Sorokina	21–13, 11–12 Retired	(silver) Runner-up
2010	Finnish International	(Denmark) Mie Schjott-Kristensen	(Russia) Andrey Ashmarin (Russia) Anastasia Prokopenko	21–12, 21–18	(gold) Winner
2009	Irish International	(Denmark) Mie Schjott-Kristensen	(England) Robin Middleton (England) Mariana Agathangelou	21–16, 23–21	(gold) Winner
2008	Czech International	(Denmark) Mie Schjott-Kristensen	(Denmark) Rasmus Bonde (Denmark) Helle Nielsen	12–21, 11–21	(silver) Runner-up
2007	Portugal International	(Denmark) Mie Schjott-Kristensen	(Denmark) Rasmus Bonde (Denmark) Christinna Pedersen	12–21, 6–21	(silver) Runner-up

BWF International Challenge tournament
BWF International Series tournament
BWF Future Series tournament

=== Invitation Tournament ===
Mixed doubles
Year	Tournament	Partner	Opponent	Score	Result
2010	Copenhagen Masters	(Denmark) Kamilla Rytter Juhl	(Denmark) Joachim Fischer Nielsen (Denmark) Christinna Pedersen	18–21, 21–18, 15–21	(silver) Runner-up
