= Spanish International (badminton) =

International badminton tournament

The Spanish International or Spanish Open is an international badminton tournament held annually since 1974, and is hosted by the Spanish Badminton Federation (FESBA).

== Winners ==
Year	Men's singles	Women's singles	Men's doubles	Women's doubles	Mixed doubles	Ref
1974	(Spain) Pedro Blach	(Spain) Dolores Cameselle	(Portugal) Pintos (Portugal) Machado	No competition	(Spain) Pedro Blach (Spain) M. L. Iglesias	
1975	(Spain) Pedro Blach	(Portugal) Margarida Cruz	(Portugal) J. Cruz (Portugal) J. Bras	No competition	(Portugal) J. Bras (Portugal) Isabel Cruz	
1976	(Spain) Pedro Blach	(Portugal) Margarida Cruz	(Portugal) J. Cruz (Portugal) J. Bras	No competition	(Spain) Pedro Blach (Portugal) Isabel Cruz	
1977	(Portugal) Antonio Crespo	No competition	(Spain) Pedro Blach (Portugal) J. Cruz	No competition		
1978	(Spain) Pedro Blach	(Portugal) Margarida Cruz	(Portugal) J. Bras (Portugal) Antonio Crespo	(Portugal) Margarida Cruz (Portugal) Isabel Cruz	(Portugal) Antonio Crespo (Portugal) Isabel Cruz	
1979	(Spain) Pedro Blach	(Spain) Concepción Janeiro	(Spain) Pedro Blach (Spain) Enrique Ruiz	(Portugal) S. Gonzaluez (Portugal) Silvia	(Portugal) H. Neto (Portugal) Silvia	
1980	(Portugal) Antonio Crespo	(Portugal) Margarida Cruz	(Spain) Enrique Ruiz (Portugal) Antonio Crespo	(Portugal) Isabel Cruz (Portugal) Margarida Cruz	(Spain) Pedro Blach (Portugal) Margarida Cruz	
1981	(Spain) Pedro Blach	(Portugal) Ana Monteiro	(Portugal) J. Brandao (Portugal) C. Gonsalues	(Portugal) S. Gonzaluez (Portugal) Ana Monteiro	(Spain) Pedro Blach (Spain) R. Pérez	
1982	(Portugal) Jorge Azevedo	(Portugal) Lilia Rodriguez	(Portugal) L. Carvalho (Portugal) José Nascimento	(Spain) Aída Carballal (Spain) Margarita Míguelez	(Portugal) J. Pedro (Portugal) L. Rodriguez	
1983	(Portugal) Antonio Crespo	(Spain) Margarita Míguelez	(Portugal) Jorge Azevedo (Portugal) D. Pereira	(Spain) Aída Carballal (Spain) Margarita Míguelez	(Spain) Pedro Blach (Spain) R. Pérez	
1984	(Switzerland) Pascal Kaul	(Spain) Maria Jesús Rodríguez	(Spain) Pedro Blach (Spain) C. González	(Spain) M. J. Rodríguez (Spain) L. Alonso	(Switzerland) Pascal Kaul (Spain) L. Alonso	
1985	(Switzerland) Pascal Kaul	(Belgium) Netty Ooms	(Switzerland) Pascal Kaul (Spain) Pedro Blach	(Belgium) Netty Ooms (Belgium) Ingrid Rogiers	(Belgium) Jose Isasi (Belgium) Netty Ooms	
1986	(Switzerland) Jorgen van der Pot	(Switzerland) Doris Gerstenkorn	(Belgium) Jose Isasi (Belgium) Eddy van Herbruggen	(Belgium) Netty Ooms (Belgium) Ingrid Rogiers	(Switzerland) Jorgen van der Pot (Switzerland) Bettina Villars	
1987	(West Germany) Rolf Aurin	(Switzerland) Bettina Villars	(West Germany) Rolf Aurin (West Germany) Andreas Ruth	(Switzerland) Doris Gerstenkorn (Switzerland) Bettina Villars	(Portugal) José Nascimento (Portugal) M. Infante	
1988	(Sweden) David Stenström	(France) Sandra Dimbour	(Sweden) David Stenström (Sweden) Svensson	(France) Virginie Devingt (France) Christelle Mol	(Spain) Bernardo Gálmez (Spain) Cristina González	
1989– 1990	No competition					
1991	(Austria) Jürgen Koch	(England) Sue Louis	(England) Andy Goode (England) Chris Hunt	(England) Julie Bradbury (England) Gillian Clark	(England) Andy Goode (England) Gillian Clark	
1992– 1994	No competition					
1995	(Portugal) Ricardo Fernandes	(Canada) Doris Piché	(Iceland) Arni Thor Hallgrimsson (Iceland) Broddi Kristjansson	(Spain) Dolores Marco (Spain) Esther Sanz	(Portugal) Hugo Rodrigues (Portugal) Ana Ferreira	
1996	(Chinese Taipei) Lee Hou-cou	(Denmark) Tanja Berg	(Chinese Taipei) Young Shyg-jeng (Chinese Taipei) Wei Chun-yi	(France) Sandra Dimbour (France) Sandrine Lefèvre	(France) Manuel Dubrulle (France) Sandrine Lefèvre	
1997	(Denmark) Niels Christian Kaldau	(Slovenia) Maja Pohar	(Chinese Taipei) Lin Wei-hsiang (Chinese Taipei) Lee Swung-yuan	(Scotland) Elinor Middlemiss (Scotland) Sandra Watt	(Scotland) Kenny Middlemiss (Scotland) Elinor Middlemiss	
1998	(Wales) Richard Vaughan	(Canada) Julia Chen	(France) Manuel Dubrulle (France) Vincent Laigle	(Denmark) Ann-Lou Jørgensen (Denmark) Mette Schjoldager	(Canada) J. P. Goyette (Canada) Julia Chen	
1999	(Indonesia) Salim	(Japan) Ida Takako	(England) Graham Hurrell (England) James Anderson	(Japan) Chikako Nakayama (Japan) Takae Masumo	(England) Ian Sullivan (England) Gail Emms	
2000	No competition					
2001	(Denmark) Joachim Fischer Nielsen	(England) Tracey Hallam	(Poland) Michał Łogosz (Poland) Robert Mateusiak	(England) Emma Chaffin (England) Sara Hardaker	(England) Peter Jeffrey (England) Suzanne Rayappan	
2002	(Netherlands) Dicky Palyama	(Sweden) Sara Persson	(France) Vincent Laigle (France) Svetoslav Stoyanov	(Sweden) Elin Bergblom (Sweden) Johanna Persson	(Scotland) Graeme Smith (Scotland) Kirsteen McEwan	
2003	(Sweden) Rasmus Wengberg	(Germany) Huaiwen Xu	(Denmark) Mathias Boe (Denmark) Michael Lamp	(Denmark) Pernille Harder (Denmark) Mette Schjoldager	(England) Robert Blair (England) Natalie Munt	
2004	(Denmark) Joachim Fischer Nielsen	(Spain) Dolores Marco	(Denmark) Jesper Larsen (Denmark) Joachim Fischer Nielsen	(Spain) Yoana Martínez (Spain) Lucía Tavera	(Spain) José Antonio Crespo (Spain) Dolores Marco	
2005	(Denmark) Niels Christian Kaldau	(Russia) Ella Karachkova	(Wales) Matthew Hughes (Wales) Martyn Lewis	(Netherlands) Karina de Witt (Netherlands) Betty Krab	(France) Jean-Michel Lefort (Russia) Ella Karachkova	
2006	(Denmark) Jens Kristian Leth	(Germany) Petra Overzier	(Wales) Matthew Hughes (Wales) Martyn Lewis	(Germany) Carina Mette (Germany) Birgit Overzier	(Denmark) Rasmus Mangor Andersen (Russia) Anastasia Russkikh	
2007	(Denmark) Peter Mikkelsen	(Germany) Juliane Schenk	(Denmark) Carsten Mogensen (Denmark) Mathias Boe	(Germany) Juliane Schenk (Germany) Nicole Grether	(Denmark) Joachim Fischer Nielsen (Denmark) Britta Andersen	
2008	(India) Chetan Anand	(Indonesia) Maria Elfira Christina	(Indonesia) Fran Kurniawan (Indonesia) Rendra Wijaya	(Indonesia) Shendy Puspa Irawati (Indonesia) Meiliana Jauhari	(Indonesia) Rendra Wijaya (Indonesia) Meiliana Jauhari	
2009	(Denmark) Hans-Kristian Vittinghus	(India) Sayali Gokhale	(Denmark) Rasmus Bonde (Denmark) Mikkel Delbo Larsen	(Denmark) Line Damkjær Kruse (Denmark) Mie Schjøtt-Kristensen	(England) Robin Middleton (England) Mariana Agathangelou	
2010	(Netherlands) Eric Pang	(Germany) Juliane Schenk	(Germany) Peter Käsbauer (Germany) Oliver Roth	(Sweden) Emelie Lennartsson (Sweden) Emma Wengberg	(Republic of Ireland) Sam Magee (Republic of Ireland) Chloe Magee	
2011	(Denmark) Viktor Axelsen	(Spain) Carolina Marín	(Poland) Adam Cwalina (Poland) Michał Łogosz	(Netherlands) Lotte Jonathans (Netherlands) Paulien van Dooremalen	(Denmark) Mikkel Delbo Larsen (Denmark) Mie Schjott-Kristensen	
2012	(France) Brice Leverdez	(Thailand) Salakjit Ponsana	(Netherlands) Jorrit de Ruiter (Netherlands) Dave Khodabux	(Russia) Tatjana Bibik (Russia) Anastasia Chervaykova	(England) Marcus Ellis (England) Gabrielle White	
2013	(Denmark) Hans-Kristian Vittinghus	(Spain) Beatriz Corrales	(Poland) Adam Cwalina (Poland) Przemysław Wacha	(England) Heather Olver (England) Kate Robertshaw	(Denmark) Anders Skaarup Rasmussen (Denmark) Lena Grebak	
2014	(Denmark) Joachim Persson	(Scotland) Kirsty Gilmour	(Poland) Łukasz Moreń (Poland) Wojciech Szkudlarczyk	(Bulgaria) Gabriela Stoeva (Bulgaria) Stefani Stoeva	(Scotland) Robert Blair (Scotland) Imogen Bankier	
2015	(Spain) Pablo Abián	(United States) Iris Wang	(Poland) Adam Cwalina (Poland) Przemysław Wacha	(Bulgaria) Gabriela Stoeva (Bulgaria) Stefani Stoeva	(Germany) Marvin Seidel (Germany) Linda Efler	
2016	(Denmark) Anders Antonsen	(Japan) Ayumi Mine	(Japan) Takuro Hoki (Japan) Yugo Kobayashi	(Japan) Sayaka Hirota (Japan) Nao Ono	(England) Ben Lane (England) Jessica Pugh	
2017	(Japan) Yu Igarashi	(Denmark) Mia Blichfeldt	(Netherlands) Jacco Arends (Netherlands) Ruben Jille	(Japan) Ayako Sakuramoto (Japan) Yukiko Takahata	(Republic of Ireland) Sam Magee (Republic of Ireland) Chloe Magee	
2018	(France) Toma Junior Popov	(Denmark) Michelle Skødstrup	(Denmark) Frederik Colberg (Denmark) Joachim Fischer Nielsen	(France) Delphine Delrue (France) Léa Palermo	(Russia) Evgenij Dremin (Russia) Evgenia Dimova	
2019	(Thailand) Kunlavut Vitidsarn	(Thailand) Phittayaporn Chaiwan	(Denmark) Mathias Boe (Denmark) Mads Conrad-Petersen	(Bulgaria) Gabriela Stoeva (Bulgaria) Stefani Stoeva	(England) Ben Lane (England) Jessica Pugh	
2020	Cancelled (Note: This tournament, originally to be played from 15 to 20 September, was later cancelled due to the COVID-19 pandemic in Spain.)					
2021	(Spain) Pablo Abián	(Malaysia) Kisona Selvaduray	(Malaysia) Man Wei Chong (Malaysia) Tee Kai Wun	(Netherlands) Alyssa Tirtosentono (Netherlands) Imke van der Aar	(Malaysia) Tee Kai Wun (Malaysia) Teoh Mei Xing	
2022	(Denmark) Victor Ørding Kauffmann	(Denmark) Laura Fløj Thomsen	(Netherlands) Noah Haase (Bulgaria) Alex Vlaar	(Denmark) Lærke Hvid (Denmark) Emilia Nesic	(England) Jonty Russ (England) Sian Kelly	
2023	(Denmark) Jakob Houe	(England) Leona Lee	(Spain) Rubén García (Spain) Carlos Piris	(Spain) Paula López (Spain) Lucía Rodríguez	(Spain) Rubén García (Spain) Lucía Rodríguez	
2024	Cancelled (Note: This tournament, originally to be played from 11 to 14 November, was later cancelled.)					

== Successful players ==
Below is the list of the most ever successful players in Spanish International Badminton Tournament:

Name	MS	WS	MD	WD	XD	Total
(Spain) Pedro Blach	6		4		5	15
(Portugal) Margarida Cruz		4		2	1	7
(Portugal) Antonio Crespo	3		2		1	6
(Portugal) Isabel Cruz				2	3	5
(Denmark) Joachim Fischer Nielsen	2		2		1	5
(Switzerland) Pascal Kaul	2		1		1	4

== Performances by nation ==
As of the 2023 edition

Pos	Nation	MS	WS	MD	WD	XD	Total
1	Spain	8	7	4.5	6	7.5	33
2	Denmark	13	4	6	4	3.5	30.5
3	Portugal	5	6	8	4	6	29
4	England	0	3	2	3	9	17
5	Germany	1	4	2	2	1.5	10.5
6	France	2	1	2	3	1.5	9.5
7	Switzerland	3	2	0.5	1	2	8.5
8	Netherlands	2	0	2.5	3	0	7.5
9	Japan	1	2	1	3	0	7
10	Sweden	2	1	1	2	0	6
11	Belgium	0	1	1	2	1	5
11	Indonesia	1	1	1	1	1	5
11	Poland	0	0	5	0	0	5
11	Scotland	0	1	0	1	3	5
15	Russia	0	1	0	1	2	4
16	Bulgaria	0	0	0.5	3	0	3.5
17	Canada	0	2	0	0	1	3
17	Chinese Taipei	1	0	2	0	0	3
17	Malaysia	0	1	1	0	1	3
17	Thailand	1	2	0	0	0	3
17	Wales	1	0	2	0	0	3
22	India	1	1	0	0	0	2
22	Ireland	0	0	0	0	2	2
24	Austria	1	0	0	0	0	1
24	Iceland	0	0	1	0	0	1
24	Slovenia	0	1	0	0	0	1
24	United States	0	1	0	0	0	1
Total		43	42	43	39	42	209
