= Emma Mason =

Scottish badminton player

Personal information
- Born: 28 June 1986 (age 40) Edinburgh, Scotland

Sport
- Country: Scotland
- Sport: Badminton
- Handedness: Right

Women's doubles
- Career record: 121 wins, 103 losses
- Highest ranking: 63 (with Samantha Ward; November 19, 2009)
- BWF profile

Emma Mason (born 28 June 1986) is a retired Scottish badminton player.

== Career ==
Mason, aged 10, started playing badminton in primary school as her mother had volunteered to run the after school club. She won the Scottish junior title in women's doubles in 2006. In 2008, she won Scottish National Championship with Imogen Bankier. She won the same title in 2010 (with Imogen Bankier) and 2011 (with Jillie Cooper) also. In 2008, she snapped her Achilles tendon in the match at Portuguese Open and returned only after an year. Her first match after rehabilitation was in Sudirman Cup 2009. She also represented her country in the 2010 Delhi Commonwealth games. Additionally, she also played for Scotland at the European and World championships. She shortly ended her playing career after that.

Mason has 27 caps for her country and, in 2010, was elected by her fellow players to the World Badminton Federation's Athletes Commission. Mason was Vice-Chair from 2010 to 2012. She became the first ever female Chair of the Athlete's Commission, a position she held until her term ended in 2015. As Chair of the commission, Mason was a full voting member of the World Badminton Federation's Council. Currently, she is a director of Badminton Europe Confederation, a member of British Showjumping's Disciplinary Panel and of British Triathlon's Audit and Governance Committee. She has an undergraduate degree in Chemistry with a dissertation focusing on the EPO test and the Athlete Biological Passport. She is also a graduate of UK Sport's International Leadership Programme and a 2015 WeAreTheCity Rising Star in the category of sport.

== Achievements ==
=== BWF International ===
Women's doubles
Year	Tournament	Partner	Opponent	Score	Result
2005	Slovak International	(Scotland) Imogen Bankier	(Poland) Nadieżda Kostiuczyk (Poland) Kamila Augustyn	7–15, 3–15	(silver) Runner-up
2005	Hungarian International	(Scotland) Imogen Bankier	(Russia) Ekaterina Ananina (Russia) Anastasia Russkikh	4–15, 15–10, 5–15	(silver) Runner-up
2005	Irish International	(Scotland) Imogen Bankier	(England) Jenny Wallwork (England) Sarah Bok	5–15, 15–3, 16–17	(silver) Runner-up
2006	Hungarian International	(Scotland) Imogen Bankier	(Russia) Ekaterina Ananina (Russia) Anastasia Russkikh	18–21, 8–21	(silver) Runner-up
2006	Iceland International	(Scotland) Imogen Bankier	(Iceland) Tinna Helgadóttir (Iceland) Ragna Ingólfsdóttir	21–16, 21–19	(gold) Winner
2006	Norwegian International	(Scotland) Imogen Bankier	(Republic of Ireland) Chloe Magee (Republic of Ireland) Bing Huang	21–16, 21–19	(gold) Winner
2006	Irish International	(Scotland) Imogen Bankier	(Netherlands) Ginny Severien (Netherlands) Karina de Wit	21–14, 11–21, 22–20	(gold) Winner
2009	Belgian International	(England) Samantha Ward	(Japan) Ayaka Takahashi (Japan) Misaki Matsutomo	8–21, 21–18, 13–21	(silver) Runner-up
2009	Scottish International	(England) Mariana Agathangelou	(Russia) Valeria Sorokina (Russia) Nina Vislova	16–21, 16–21	(silver) Runner-up
2010	Banuinvest International	(Scotland) Jillie Cooper	(Singapore) Shinta Mulia Sari (Singapore) Yao Lei	6–21, 10–21	(silver) Runner-up

Mixed doubles
Year	Tournament	Partner	Opponent	Score	Result
2006	Iceland International	(Scotland) Andrew Bowman	(Sweden) Henri Hurskainen (Sweden) Emma Wengberg	19–21, 16–21	(silver) Runner-up

BWF International Challenge tournament
BWF International Series tournament
