= Guo Xin =

Chinese footballer

Personal information
- Date of birth: 18 November 2008 (age 17)
- Place of birth: Meizhou, Guangdong, China
- Height: 1.78 m (5 ft 10 in)
- Position: Midfielder

Team information
- Current team: Shandong Taishan B
- Number: 14

Youth career
- Shandong Luneng Taishan Football School

Senior career*
Years	Team	Apps	(Gls)
2026–	Shandong Taishan B	16	(1)

International career^{‡}
2024	China U16		
- * Club domestic league appearances and goals as of 15 October 2026 ‡ National team caps and goals as of 15 October 2026

Guo Xin (Chinese: 郭鑫; pinyin: Guō Xīn; born 18 November 2008) is a Chinese professional footballer who plays as a midfielder for China League Two club Shandong Taishan B.

== Early life and youth career ==
Guo Xin was born on 18 November 2008. He was a member of the Shandong Taishan youth academy system.

== Club career ==
=== Youth career ===
On 26 November 2022, Guo Xin scored for Shandong Taishan U15 in the final of the first China Youth Football League U15 category against Wuhan Three Towns U15, helping his team to a 3–0 victory and the championship.

On 22 October 2023, in the second leg of the second Chinese Youth Football League U15 final, Guo Xin took a corner kick in the 13th minute that led to the only goal of the match, as Shandong Taishan U15 defeated Evergrande Football School U15 1–0, winning the championship 2–1 on aggregate.

=== Shandong Taishan B ===
On 1 March 2026, Guo Xin moved from Shandong Luneng Taishan Football School to Shandong Taishan B. He wears the squad number 14.

On 15 April 2026, Guo Xin came on as a substitute and scored in the 72nd minute, sealing a 3–0 victory for Shandong Taishan B against Lanzhou Longyuan Athletic in China League Two.

== International career ==
In July 2024, Guo Xin was called up to the China U16 national team for the sixth training camp, held from 28 July to 14 August 2024 in Shenyang.

In November 2024, Guo Xin was called up to the China U16 national team for the ninth training camp, held from 1 to 12 December 2024 at the Haigeng Sports Training Base in Kunming.

== Career statistics ==
=== Club ===
As of 15 October 2026

Appearances and goals by club, season and competition
Club	Season	League			National Cup		Continental		Other		Total	
Club	Season	Division	Apps	Goals	Apps	Goals	Apps	Goals	Apps	Goals	Apps	Goals
Shandong Taishan B	2026	China League Two	16	1	0	0	—		—		16	1
Career total			16	1	0	0	0	0	0	0	16	1

== Honours ==
Shandong Taishan U15

- China Youth Football League U15: 2022, 2023
