= Jacob Chemnitz =

Danish badminton player (born 1984)

Personal information
- Born: 19 November 1984 (age 41)

Sport
- Country: Denmark
- Sport: Badminton

Men's & mixed doubles
- Highest ranking: 30 (MD 21 January 2008); 19 (XD 21 January 2008)
- BWF profile
Medal record
Men's badminton
Representing Denmark
European Junior Championships
| Silver medal – second place | 2003 Esbjerg | Mixed team |
| Bronze medal – third place | 2003 Esbjerg | Mixed doubles |

Jacob Chemnitz (born 19 November 1984) is a Danish badminton player from the Lillerød team. As a junior, Chemnitz won the mixed doubles title at the 2002/2003 Danish U-19 National Championships partnering with Line Reimers who also trained at Lillerød. He also secured a bronze medal in mixed doubles at the 2003 European Junior Championships alongside Mille Pjedsted. In senior competitions, Chemnitz won international tournaments at the 2006 Cyprus, 2007 Portugal and Polish International tournaments partnered with Mikkel Delbo Larsen in the men's doubles. Teaming up with Marie Røpke in mixed doubles, he also claimed victory at the 2008 Irish International.

== Achievements ==
=== European Junior Championships ===
Mixed doubles
| Year | Venue | Partner | Opponent | Score | Result |
|---|---|---|---|---|---|
| 2003 | Esjberg, Denmark | (Denmark) Mille Pjedsted | (Russia) Dimitri Pankov (Russia) Nina Vislova | 10–13, 2–11 | Bronze |

=== BWF International Challenge/Series ===
Men's doubles
| Year | Tournament | Partner | Opponent | Score | Result |
|---|---|---|---|---|---|
| 2008 | Czech International | (Denmark) Mikkel Delbo Larsen | (Denmark) Kasper Faust Henriksen (Denmark) Christian Skovgaard | 16–21, 16–21 | (silver) Runner-up |
| 2008 | Finnish International | (Denmark) Mikkel Delbo Larsen | (Indonesia) Fran Kurniawan (Indonesia) Rendra Wijaya | 19–21, 21–11, 14–21 | (silver) Runner-up |
| 2007 | Norwegian International | (Denmark) Mikkel Delbo Larsen | (United States) Khan Bob Malaythong (United States) Howard Bach | 15–21, 11–21 | (silver) Runner-up |
| 2007 | Polish Open | (Denmark) Mikkel Delbo Larsen | (Germany) Johannes Schöttler (Germany) Tim Dettmann | 14–21, 21–17, 21–19 | (gold) Winner |
| 2007 | Portugal International | (Denmark) Mikkel Delbo Larsen | (England) Dean George (England) Chris Tonks | 21–18, 21–17 | (gold) Winner |
| 2006 | Cyprus International | (Denmark) Mikkel Delbo Larsen | (France) Mihail Popov (France) Svetoslav Stoyanov | 21–14, 21–13 | (gold) Winner |

Mixed doubles
| Year | Tournament | Partner | Opponent | Score | Result |
|---|---|---|---|---|---|
| 2008 | Irish International | (Denmark) Marie Røpke | (Denmark) Kasper Faust Henriksen (Denmark) Britta Andersen | 17–21, 21–17, 21–15 | (gold) Winner |
| 2008 | Dutch International | (Denmark) Marie Røpke | (Denmark) Rasmus Bonde (Denmark) Helle Nielsen | 15–21, 12–21 | (silver) Runner-up |
| 2007 | Swedish International | (Denmark) Julie Houmann | (Denmark) Rasmus Bonde (Denmark) Christinna Pedersen | 12–21, 8–21 | (silver) Runner-up |
| 2006 | Swedish International | (Denmark) Julie Houmann | (Indonesia) Imam Sodikin (Switzerland) Cynthia Tuwankotta | 21–17, 21–23, 18–21 | (silver) Runner-up |
| 2005 | Iceland International | (Denmark) Julie Houmann | (Sweden) Henri Hurskainen (Sweden) Johanna Persson | 5–15, 15–13, 11–15 | (silver) Runner-up |
| 2005 | Hungarian International | (Denmark) Julie Houmann | (Russia) Vladimir Malkov (Russia) Anastasia Russkikh | 12–15, 12–15 | (silver) Runner-up |
| 2005 | French International | (Denmark) Julie Houmann | (France) Nabil Lasmari (Indonesia) Eny Widiowati | 15–4, 7–15, 13–15 | (silver) Runner-up |

BWF International Challenge tournament
BWF International Series tournament
