= Mariana Agathangelou =

British badminton player

Personal information
- Born: 14 August 1988 (age 38) Jersey
- Height: 5 ft 10 in (178 cm)

Sport
- Country: England
- Sport: Badminton
- Handedness: Right
- Coached by: Nathan Robertson

Women's & mixed doubles
- Highest ranking: 23 (17 April 2010)
- BWF profile
Medal record
Women's badminton
Representing England
Commonwealth Games
Bronze medal – third place	2010 Delhi	Mixed team
European Championships
Bronze medal – third place	2010 Manchester	Women's doubles
European Mixed Team Championships
Silver medal – second place	2009 Liverpool	Mixed team
European Junior Championships
Gold medal – first place	2007 Völklingen	Mixed team
Bronze medal – third place	2007 Völklingen	Girls' doubles

Mariana Agathangelou (born 14 August 1988) is a British badminton player. She competed for England in the mixed team event at the 2010 Commonwealth Games where she won a bronze medal. She went on to represent Jersey in the same competition at the 2014 Commonwealth Games but was eliminated in the knockout stages.

== Achievements ==
=== European Championships ===
Women's doubles
Year	Venue	Partner	Opponent	Score	Result
2010	Manchester Evening News Arena; Manchester, England	(England) Heather Olver	(Bulgaria) Petya Nedelcheva (Russia) Anastasia Russkikh	18–21, 13–21	Bronze

=== European Junior Championships ===
Girls' doubles
Year	Venue	Partner	Opponent	Score	Result
2007	Hermann-Neuberger-Halle; Völklingen, Germany	(England) Gabrielle White	(Belarus) Olga Konon (Czech Republic) Kristína Ludíková	20–22, 12–21	Bronze

=== BWF International Challenge/Series ===
Women's doubles
Year	Tournament	Partner	Opponent	Score	Result
2005	Welsh International	(England) Rachel Howard	(England) Hayley Connor (England) Heather Olver	15–6, 16–17, 4–15	(silver) Runner-up
2006	Welsh International	(England) Natalie Munt	(England) Jenny Wallwork (England) Suzanne Rayappan	Walkover	(gold) Winner
2006	Slovak International	(England) Gabrielle White	(England) Sarah Bok (England) Suzanne Rayappan	21–13, 14–21, 20–22	(silver) Runner-up
2007	Scottish International	(England) Gabrielle White	(Russia) Valeria Sorokina (Russia) Nina Vislova	14–21, 14–21	(silver) Runner-up
2008	Portugal International	(England) Gabrielle White	(China) Cai Jiani (China) Zhang Xi	17–21, 14–21	(silver) Runner-up
2008	Scottish International	(Scotland) Jillie Cooper	(Sweden) Emelie Lennartsson (Sweden) Emma Wengberg	21–17, 21–13	(gold) Winner
2008	Welsh International	(Scotland) Jillie Cooper	(Netherlands) Ilse Vaessen (Netherlands) Rachel van Cutsen	17–21, 21–19, 21–16	(gold) Winner
2009	Scottish International	(Scotland) Emma Mason	(Russia) Valeria Sorokina (Russia) Nina Vislova	16–21, 16–21	(silver) Runner-up
2009	Irish International	(England) Heather Olver	(Denmark) Maria Helsbøl (Denmark) Anne Skelbæk	21–13, 21–19	(gold) Winner
2010	Scottish International	(England) Heather Olver	(England) Jenny Wallwork (England) Gabrielle White	17–21, 17–21	(silver) Runner-up
2010	Irish International	(England) Heather Olver	(Denmark) Maria Helsbøl (Denmark) Anne Skelbæk	21–12, 12–21, 15–21	(silver) Runner-up
2011	Belgian International	(England) Heather Olver	(Singapore) Shinta Mulia Sari (Singapore) Yao Lei	12–21, 18–21	(silver) Runner-up
2011	Bulgarian International	(England) Heather Olver	(India) Pradnya Gadre (India) Prajakta Sawant	18–21, 21–7, 21–10	(gold) Winner
2011	Irish International	(England) Heather Olver	(Malaysia) Ng Hui Ern (Malaysia) Ng Hui Lin	21–14, 16–21, 11–21	(silver) Runner-up
2012	Swedish Masters	(England) Heather Olver	(United States) Eva Lee (United States) Paula Lynn Obañana	21–15, 21–12	(gold) Winner
2012	Polish Open	(England) Heather Olver	(United States) Eva Lee (United States) Paula Lynn Obañana	21–12, 23–21	(gold) Winner
2012	Spanish Open	(England) Alexandra Langley	(Russia) Tatjana Bibik (Russia) Anastasia Chervaykova	21–12, 16–21, 18–21	(silver) Runner-up

Mixed doubles
Year	Tournament	Partner	Opponent	Score	Result
2009	Spanish Open	(England) Robin Middleton	(India) Arun Vishnu (India) Aparna Balan	21–16, 21–15	(gold) Winner
2009	Norwegian International	(England) Robin Middleton	(England) Marcus Ellis (England) Heather Olver	19–21, 17–21	(silver) Runner-up
2009	Irish International	(England) Robin Middleton	(Denmark) Mikkel Delbo Larsen (Denmark) Mie Schjøtt-Kristensen	16–21, 21–23	(silver) Runner-up
2010	European Circuit Finals	(England) Robin Middleton	(Austria) Roman Zirnwald (Austria) Simone Prutsch	21–14, 21–14	(gold) Winner

BWF International Challenge tournament
BWF International Series tournament
