= Peter Mikkelsen (badminton) =

Danish badminton player (born 1982)

Personal information
- Born: 9 August 1982 (age 43)
- Height: 1.80 m (5 ft 11 in)

Sport
- Country: Denmark
- Sport: Badminton

Men's singles
- Highest ranking: 37 (11 March 2010)
- BWF profile

Peter Mikkelsen (born 9 August 1982) is a Danish badminton player. Mikkelsen was a part of the Horsens club and also trained in Aarhus. In 2009, he reach the final round at the national championships for the first time. He reaching the final round after beat Joachim Persson and Jan Ø. Jørgensen, but he lost to Peter Gade in the rubber game. In 2006, he won the international tournament in Cyprus. The following year in 2007 he was victorious at the Portugal International, Spanish Open and Irish International. He conquered the Croatian International title in 2009 along with the Finnish International. In Denmark Peter Mikkelsen won many single matches on Vendsyssel's league team giving him a cult status bearing the nickname "mayor" in Northern Jutland. He now is the head coach/trainer at the Horsens Badminton Klub (HBK) in Denmark.

== Achievements ==
=== BWF International Challenge/Series ===
Men's singles

Year	Tournament	Opponent	Score	Result
2006	Czech International	(Denmark) Jan Ø. Jørgensen	18–21, 15–21	(silver) Runner-up
2006	Cyprus International	(Belgium) Yuhan Tan	21–15, 17–21, 21–14	(gold) Winner
2007	Portugal International	(Denmark) Michael Christensen	21–16, 21–17	(gold) Winner
2007	Spanish Open	(Czech Republic) Jan Vondra	21–9, 5–21, 21–15	(gold) Winner
2007	Irish International	(Germany) Marc Zwiebler	21–19, 21–18	(gold) Winner
2009	Croatian International	(Czech Republic) Jan Vondra	23–21, 21–6	(gold) Winner
2009	Finnish International	(Germany) Marc Zwiebler	21–14, 16–21, 22–20	(gold) Winner
2009	Scotland International	(Germany) Marc Zwiebler	15–21, 21–15, 16–21	(silver) Runner-up
2009	Irish International	(Sweden) Henri Hurskainen	15–21, 21–13, 17–21	(silver) Runner-up

BWF International Challenge tournament
BWF International Series tournament
