= 2006 European Men's Team Badminton Championships group stage =

This article lists the full results for group stage of 2006 European Men's Team Badminton Championships. The group stage was held from 14 to 16 February 2006.

== Group 1 ==
Pos	Team	Pld	W	L	MF	MA	MD	GF	GA	GD	PF	PA	PD	Pts	Qualification	Denmark	Ireland	Iceland	Armenia
1	Denmark	3	3	0	15	0	+15	30	0	+30	630	225	+405	3	Knockout stage	—	5–0	5–0	5–0
2	Ireland	3	2	1	10	5	+5	20	12	+8	544	464	+80	2			—	5–0	5–0
3	Iceland	3	1	2	4	11	−7	10	23	−13	459	581	−122	1				—	4–1
4	Armenia	3	0	3	1	14	−13	3	28	−25	269	632	−363	0					—

Source: BWF

=== Denmark vs. Armenia ===
Denmark
5
Alexandreio Melathron, Main Court 1
14 February 2006, 09:00 UTC+3

Armenia
0

			1	2	3
1	(Denmark) (Armenia)	Peter Gade; Hayk Misakyan	21; 3	21; 7
2	(Denmark) (Armenia)	Niels Christian Kaldau; Spartak Rsyan	21; 3	21; 2
3	(Denmark) (Armenia)	Joachim Persson; Levon Torosyan	21; 12	21; 5
4	(Denmark) (Armenia)	Jens Eriksen / Martin Lundgaard Hansen; Hrachya Mantsakanyan / Spartak Rsyan	21; 1	21; 0
5	(Denmark) (Armenia)	Mathias Boe / Carsten Mogensen; Hayk Misakyan / Levon Torosyan	21; 4	21; 12

=== Iceland vs. Ireland ===
Iceland
0
Alexandreio Melathron, Main Court 2
14 February 2006, 09:00 UTC+3

Ireland
5

			1	2	3
1	(Iceland) (Republic of Ireland)	Daniel Reynisson; Scott Evans	15; 21	12; 21
2	(Iceland) (Republic of Ireland)	Magnús Ingi Helgason; Lee Evans	18; 21	21; 14	12; 21
3	(Iceland) (Republic of Ireland)	Friðrik Veigar Guðjónsson; Bruce Topping	11; 21	4; 21
4	(Iceland) (Republic of Ireland)	Magnús Ingi Helgason / Njörður Ludvigsson; Bruce Topping / Mark Topping	9; 21	15; 21
5	(Iceland) (Republic of Ireland)	Friðrik Veigar Guðjónsson / Hólmsteinn Þór Valdimarsson; Scott Evans / Brian Smyth	21; 18	10; 21	15; 21

=== Denmark vs. Iceland ===
Denmark
5
Alexandreio Melathron, Pavilion Court 1
15 February 2006, 09:00 UTC+3

Iceland
0

			1	2	3
1	(Denmark) (Iceland)	Kenneth Jonassen; Daniel Reynisson	21; 5	21; 6
2	(Denmark) (Iceland)	Niels Christian Kaldau; Magnús Ingi Helgason	21; 3	21; 6
3	(Denmark) (Iceland)	Joachim Persson; Hólmsteinn Þór Valdimarsson	21; 8	21; 13
4	(Denmark) (Iceland)	Jens Eriksen / Martin Lundgaard Hansen; Magnús Ingi Helgason / Njörður Ludvigsson	21; 6	21; 12
5	(Denmark) (Iceland)	Jonas Rasmussen / Peter Steffensen; Friðrik Veigar Guðjónsson / Hólmsteinn Þór Valdimarsson	21; 17	21; 8

=== Armenia vs. Ireland ===
Armenia
0
Alexandreio Melathron, Pavilion Court 2
15 February 2006, 09:00 UTC+3

Ireland
5

			1	2	3
1	(Armenia) (Republic of Ireland)	Hayk Misakyan; Scott Evans	6; 21	15; 21
2	(Armenia) (Republic of Ireland)	Spartak Rsyan; Lee Evans	7; 21	8; 21
3	(Armenia) (Republic of Ireland)	Levon Torosyan; Bruce Topping	12; 21	15; 21
4	(Armenia) (Republic of Ireland)	Hrachya Mantsakanyan / Spartak Rsyan; Bruce Topping / Mark Topping	5; 21	1; 21
5	(Armenia) (Republic of Ireland)	Hayk Misakyan / Levon Torosyan; Scott Evans / Bryan Smith	14; 21	8; 21

=== Denmark vs. Ireland ===
Denmark
5
Alexandreio Melathron, Main Court 1
16 February 2006, 13:00 UTC+3

Ireland
0

			1	2	3
1	(Denmark) (Republic of Ireland)	Peter Gade; Scott Evans	21; 17	21; 7
2	(Denmark) (Republic of Ireland)	Kenneth Jonassen; Lee Evans	21; 5	21; 8
3	(Denmark) (Republic of Ireland)	Joachim Persson; Bryan Smith	21; 8	21; 11
4	(Denmark) (Republic of Ireland)	Jens Eriksen / Martin Lundgaard Hansen; Bruce Topping / Mark Topping	21; 9	21; 10
5	(Denmark) (Republic of Ireland)	Jonas Rasmussen / Peter Steffensen; Scott Evans / Donal O'Halloran	21; 9	21; 8

=== Armenia vs. Iceland ===
Armenia
1
Alexandreio Melathron, Pavilion Court 5
16 February 2006, 13:00 UTC+3

Iceland
4

			1	2	3
1	(Armenia) (Iceland)	Hayk Misakyan; Daniel Reynisson	21; 14	21; 16
2	(Armenia) (Iceland)	Hrachya Mantsakanyan; Magnús Ingi Helgason	3; 21	4; 21
3	(Armenia) (Iceland)	Levon Torosyan; Njörður Ludvigsson	21; 14	8; 21	16; 21
4	(Armenia) (Iceland)	Hrachya Mantsakanyan / Spartak Rsyan; Magnús Ingi Helgason / Daniel Reynisson	6; 21	4; 21
5	(Armenia) (Iceland)	Hayk Misakyan / Levon Torosyan; Njörður Ludvigsson / Hólmsteinn Þór Valdimarsson	14; 21	11; 21

== Group 2 ==
Pos	Team	Pld	W	L	MF	MA	MD	GF	GA	GD	PF	PA	PD	Pts	Qualification	Germany	Finland	Portugal	Belarus
1	Germany	3	3	0	14	1	+13	29	2	+27	651	411	+240	3	Knockout stage	—	5–0	5–0	5–0
2	Finland	3	2	1	10	5	+5	21	13	+8	651	580	+71	2			—	4–1	5–0
3	Portugal	3	1	2	6	9	−3	14	21	−7	584	670	−86	1				—	5–0
4	Belarus	3	0	3	0	15	−15	2	30	−28	448	673	−225	0					—

Source: BWF

=== Germany vs. Belarus ===
Germany
5
Alexandreio Melathron, Pavilion Court 3
14 February 2006, 09:00 UTC+3

Belarus
0

			1	2	3
1	(Germany) (Belarus)	Björn Joppien; Andrei Malioutin	21; 19	21; 12
2	(Germany) (Belarus)	Roman Spitko; Yury Sakolin	21; 10	21; 8
3	(Germany) (Belarus)	Marcel Reuter; Yauheni Yakauchuk	21; 8	21; 10
4	(Germany) (Belarus)	Michael Fuchs / Roman Spitko; Andrei Konakh / Andrei Malioutin	21; 19	21; 13
5	(Germany) (Belarus)	Tim Dettmann / Ingo Kindervater; Yury Sakolin / Yauheni Yakauchuk	21; 10	21; 5

=== Portugal vs. Finland ===
Portugal
1
Alexandreio Melathron, Pavilion Court 5
14 February 2006, 09:00 UTC+3

Finland
4

			1	2	3
1	(Portugal) (Finland)	Alexandre Paixão; Ville Lång	21; 23	18; 21
2	(Portugal) (Finland)	Marco Vasconcelos; Markus Heikkinen	11; 21	21; 15	21; 19
3	(Portugal) (Finland)	Pedro Martins; Markus Rouvinen	6; 21	13; 21
4	(Portugal) (Finland)	Alexandre Paixão / Marco Vasconcelos; Mikko Vikman / Petri Hyyryläinen	11; 21	21; 16	18; 21
5	(Portugal) (Finland)	Ricardo Fernandes / Gil Martins; Tuomas Karhula / Antti Viitikko	22; 20	13; 21	18; 21

=== Germany vs. Portugal ===
Germany
5
Alexandreio Melathron, Main Court 3
15 February 2006, 09:00 UTC+3

Portugal
0

			1	2	3
1	(Germany) (Portugal)	Björn Joppien; Alexandre Paixão	21; 13	21; 5
2	(Germany) (Portugal)	Conrad Hückstädt; Marco Vasconcelos	21; 16	21; 11
3	(Germany) (Portugal)	Roman Spitko; Pedro Martins	21; 14	21; 14
4	(Germany) (Portugal)	Kristof Hopp / Ingo Kindervater; Alexandre Paixão / Marco Vasconcelos	21; 17	21; 12
5	(Germany) (Portugal)	Tim Dettmann / Michael Fuchs; Ricardo Fernandes / Gil Martins	21; 10	21; 5

=== Belarus vs. Finland ===
Belarus
0
Alexandreio Melathron, Main Court 4
15 February 2006, 09:00 UTC+3

Finland
5

			1	2	3
1	(Belarus) (Finland)	Andrei Malioutin; Ville Lång	17; 21	17; 21
2	(Belarus) (Finland)	Yury Sakolin; Markus Heikkinen	10; 21	14; 21
3	(Belarus) (Finland)	Yauheni Yakauchuk; Markus Rouvinen	9; 21	10; 21
4	(Belarus) (Finland)	Andrei Konakh / Andrei Malioutin; Mikko Vikman / Petri Hyyryläinen	16; 21	15; 21
5	(Belarus) (Finland)	Yury Sakolin / Yauheni Yakauchuk; Tuomas Karhula / Antti Viitikko	12; 21	15; 21

=== Belarus vs. Portugal ===
Belarus
0
Alexandreio Melathron, Pavilion Court 2
16 February 2006, 09:00 UTC+3

Portugal
5

			1	2	3
1	(Belarus) (Portugal)	Andrei Malioutin; Alexandre Paixão	21; 18	15; 21	13; 21
2	(Belarus) (Portugal)	Yury Sakolin; Marco Vasconcelos	11; 21	14; 21
3	(Belarus) (Portugal)	Yauheni Yakauchuk; Ricardo Fernandes	16; 21	14; 21
4	(Belarus) (Portugal)	Andrei Konakh / Andrei Malioutin; Alexandre Paixão / Marco Vasconcelos	23; 25	22; 24
5	(Belarus) (Portugal)	Yury Sakolin / Yauheni Yakauchuk; Ricardo Fernandes / Gil Martins	21; 18	14; 21	15; 21

=== Germany vs. Finland ===
Germany
4
Alexandreio Melathron, Main Court 2
16 February 2006, 17:00 UTC+3

Finland
1

			1	2	3
1	(Germany) (Finland)	Björn Joppien; Ville Lång	21; 16	21; 19
2	(Germany) (Finland)	Kristof Hopp / Ingo Kindervater; Mikko Vikman / Petri Hyyryläinen	21; 16	21; 8
3	(Germany) (Finland)	Conrad Hückstädt; Markus Heikkinen	19; 21	21; 14	22; 24
4	(Germany) (Finland)	Tim Dettmann / Michael Fuchs; Tuomas Karhula / Antti Viitikko	22; 20	21; 16
5	(Germany) (Finland)	Roman Spitko; Markus Rouvinen	21; 16	21; 10

== Group 3 ==
Pos	Team	Pld	W	L	MF	MA	MD	GF	GA	GD	PF	PA	PD	Pts	Qualification	Austria	Wales	Scotland	Cyprus
1	Austria	3	3	0	12	3	+9	26	5	+21	636	471	+165	3	Knockout stage	—	3–2	4–1	5–0
2	Wales	3	2	1	11	4	+7	20	12	+8	616	517	+99	2			—	4–1	4–1
3	Scotland	3	1	2	6	9	−3	14	16	−2	544	517	+27	1				—	5–0
4	Cyprus	3	0	3	1	14	−13	2	29	−27	353	644	−291	0					—

Source: BWF

=== Wales vs. Cyprus ===
Wales
4
Alexandreio Melathron, Pavilion Court 2
14 February 2006, 09:00 UTC+3

Cyprus
1

			1	2	3
1	(Wales) (Cyprus)	Martyn Lewis; Savinos Iasonos	21; 6	21; 9
2	(Wales) (Cyprus)	Joe Morgan; Dimitris Kyprianou	20; 22	21; 16	15; 21
3	(Wales) (Cyprus)	Richard Vaughan; Christos Nicolaides	21; 11	21; 13
4	(Wales) (Cyprus)	Matthew Hughes / Martyn Lewis; Savinos Iasonos / Dimitris Kyprianou	21; 15	21; 8
5	(Wales) (Cyprus)	Joe Morgan / James Phillips; Marinos Argyrou / Christos Nicolaides	21; 16	21; 6

=== Scotland vs. Austria ===
Scotland
1
Alexandreio Melathron, Pavilion Court 2
14 February 2006, 13:00 UTC+3

Austria
4

			1	2	3
1	(Scotland) (Austria)	Craig Goddard; Jürgen Koch	17; 21	14; 21
2	(Scotland) (Austria)	Gordon Thomson; Peter Zauner	18; 21	17; 21
3	(Scotland) (Austria)	Stuart Gilliland; Michael Lahnsteiner	17; 21	18; 21
4	(Scotland) (Austria)	Andrew Bowman / Keith Turnbull; Jürgen Koch / Peter Zauner	19; 21	19; 21
5	(Scotland) (Austria)	Thomas Bethel / Watson Briggs; Michael Lahnsteiner / Michael Trojan	21; 19	21; 18

=== Wales vs. Scotland ===
Wales
4
Alexandreio Melathron, Pavilion Court 3
15 February 2006, 09:00 UTC+3

Scotland
1

			1	2	3
1	(Wales) (Scotland)	Martyn Lewis; Craig Goddard	21; 19	21; 13
2	(Wales) (Scotland)	James Phillips; Gordon Thomson	17; 21	18; 21
3	(Wales) (Scotland)	Matthew Hughes; Stuart Gilliland	22; 20	21; 17
4	(Wales) (Scotland)	Joe Morgan / James Phillips; Thomas Bethel / Watson Briggs	21; 12	21; 12
5	(Wales) (Scotland)	Matthew Hughes / Martyn Lewis; Andrew Bowman / Keith Turnbull	21; 10	21; 8

=== Cyprus vs. Austria ===
Cyprus
0
Alexandreio Melathron, Pavilion Court 3
15 February 2006, 17:00 UTC+3

Austria
5

			1	2	3
1	(Cyprus) (Austria)	Savinos Iasonos; Jürgen Koch	11; 21	14; 21
2	(Cyprus) (Austria)	Dimitris Kyprianou; Peter Zauner	13; 21	13; 21
3	(Cyprus) (Austria)	Christos Nicolaides; Michael Lahnsteiner	3; 21	6; 21
4	(Cyprus) (Austria)	Savinos Iasonos / Dimitris Kyprianou; Jürgen Koch / Peter Zauner	9; 21	12; 21
5	(Cyprus) (Austria)	Marinos Argyrou / Christos Nicolaides; Heimo Götschl / Roman Zirnwald	13; 21	8; 21

=== Cyprus vs. Scotland ===
Cyprus
0
Alexandreio Melathron, Pavilion Court 4
16 February 2006, 13:00 UTC+3

Scotland
5

			1	2	3
1	(Cyprus) (Scotland)	Savinos Iasonos; Craig Goddard	11; 21	12; 21
2	(Cyprus) (Scotland)	Dimitris Kyprianou; Gordon Thomson	16; 21	14; 21
3	(Cyprus) (Scotland)	Christos Nicolaides; Stuart Gilliland	5; 21	4; 21
4	(Cyprus) (Scotland)	Savinos Iasonos / Dimitris Kyprianou; Andrew Bowman / Keith Turnbull	10; 21	13; 21
5	(Cyprus) (Scotland)	Marinos Argyrou / Christos Nicolaides; Thomas Bethel / Watson Briggs	10; 21	13; 21

=== Wales vs. Austria ===
Wales
2
Alexandreio Melathron, Main Court 1
16 February 2006, 17:00 UTC+3

Austria
3

			1	2	3
1	(Wales) (Austria)	Martyn Lewis; Jürgen Koch	20; 22	10; 21
2	(Wales) (Austria)	James Phillips; Peter Zauner	18; 21	8; 21
3	(Wales) (Austria)	Matthew Hughes; Michael Lahnsteiner	17; 21	17; 21
4	(Wales) (Austria)	Matthew Hughes / Martyn Lewis; Jürgen Koch / Michael Lahnsteiner	16; 21	21; 17		retired
5	(Wales) (Austria)	Joe Morgan / James Phillips; Heimo Götschl / Roman Zirnwald	19; 21	21; 16	21; 19

== Group 4 ==
Pos	Team	Pld	W	L	MF	MA	MD	GF	GA	GD	PF	PA	PD	Pts	Qualification	France	Czech Republic	Romania	Turkey
1	France	3	3	0	12	3	+9	24	10	+14	666	537	+129	3	Knockout stage	—	3–2	4–1	5–0
2	Czech Republic	3	2	1	12	3	+9	25	6	+19	624	446	+178	2			—	5–0	5–0
3	Romania	3	1	2	4	11	−7	9	22	−13	500	613	−113	1				—	3–2
4	Turkey	3	0	3	2	13	−11	6	26	−20	461	655	−194	0					—

Source: BWF

=== France vs. Turkey ===
France
5
Alexandreio Melathron, Pavilion Court 3
14 February 2006, 13:00 UTC+3

Turkey
0

			1	2	3
1	(France) (Turkey)	Jean-Michel Lefort; Mehmet Tural	21; 7	15; 21	21; 12
2	(France) (Turkey)	Simon Maunoury; Ali Kaya	21; 11	19; 21	21; 13
3	(France) (Turkey)	Olivier Fossy; Murat Sen	21; 9	21; 8
4	(France) (Turkey)	Erwin Kehlhoffner / Thomas Quéré; Ali Kaya / Mehmet Tural	21; 16	21; 10
5	(France) (Turkey)	Mihail Popov / Sébastien Vincent; Nuri Balkan / Hasan Hüseyin Durakcan	21; 9	21; 13

=== Romania vs. Czech Republic ===
Romania
0
Alexandreio Melathron, Pavilion Court 4
14 February 2006, 13:00 UTC+3

Czech Republic
5

			1	2	3
1	(Romania) (Czech Republic)	Florin Posteucă; Jan Fröhlich	17; 21	10; 21
2	(Romania) (Czech Republic)	Robert Ciobotaru; Petr Koukal	5; 21	11; 21
3	(Romania) (Czech Republic)	George Constantinescu; Jan Vondra	8; 21	12; 21
4	(Romania) (Czech Republic)	Ionuţ Gradinaru / Florin Patroaica; Stanislav Kohoutek / Petr Koukal	18; 21	9; 21
5	(Romania) (Czech Republic)	Robert Ciobotaru / George Constantinescu; Jan Fröhlich / Jan Vondra	13; 21	13; 21

=== France vs. Romania ===
France
4
Alexandreio Melathron, Main Court 1
15 February 2006, 13:00 UTC+3

Romania
1

			1	2	3
1	(France) (Romania)	Simon Maunoury; Florin Posteucă	19; 21	15; 21
2	(France) (Romania)	Erwin Kehlhoffner; Robert Ciobotaru	21; 8	21; 16
3	(France) (Romania)	Olivier Fossy; George Constantinescu	21; 16	21; 16
4	(France) (Romania)	Thomas Quéré / Sébastien Vincent; Ionuţ Gradinaru / Florin Patroaica	21; 19	18; 21	21; 12
5	(France) (Romania)	Mihail Popov / Svetoslav Stoyanov; Robert Ciobotaru / George Constantinescu	21; 18	21; 15

=== Turkey vs. Czech Republic ===
Turkey
0
Alexandreio Melathron, Main Court 2
15 February 2006, 17:00 UTC+3

Czech Republic
5

			1	2	3
1	(Turkey) (Czech Republic)	Mehmet Tural; Jan Fröhlich	12; 21	9; 21
2	(Turkey) (Czech Republic)	Ali Kaya; Petr Koukal	12; 21	13; 21
3	(Turkey) (Czech Republic)	Hasan Hüseyin Durakcan; Stanislav Kohoutek	16; 21	13; 21
4	(Turkey) (Czech Republic)	Ali Kaya / Mehmet Tural; Jan Fröhlich / Jan Vondra	19; 21	14; 21
5	(Turkey) (Czech Republic)	Nuri Balkan / Hasan Hüseyin Durakcan; Stanislav Kohoutek / Petr Koukal	8; 21	12; 21

=== Turkey vs. Romania ===
Turkey
2
Alexandreio Melathron, Pavilion Court 1
16 February 2006, 17:00 UTC+3

Romania
3

			1	2	3
1	(Turkey) (Romania)	Mehmet Tural; Florin Posteucă	15; 21	9; 21
2	(Turkey) (Romania)	Ali Kaya; Robert Ciobotaru	18; 21	19; 21
3	(Turkey) (Romania)	Hasan Hüseyin Durakcan; George Constantinescu	29; 30	9; 21
4	(Turkey) (Romania)	Nuri Balkan / Murat Sen; Robert Ciobotaru / George Constantinescu	21; 17	21; 17
5	(Turkey) (Romania)	Mehmet Tural / Ali Kaya; Ionuţ Gradinaru / Florin Patroaica	21; 18	21; 14

=== France vs. Czech Republic ===
France
3
Alexandreio Melathron, Pavilion Court 2
16 February 2006, 17:00 UTC+3

Czech Republic
2

			1	2	3
1	(France) (Czech Republic)	Jean-Michel Lefort; Jan Fröhlich	16; 21	13; 21
2	(France) (Czech Republic)	Simon Maunoury; Petr Koukal	19; 21	14; 21
3	(France) (Czech Republic)	Erwin Kehlhoffner; Jan Vondra	21; 14	12; 21	21; 18
4	(France) (Czech Republic)	Mihail Popov / Svetoslav Stoyanov; Jan Fröhlich / Stanislav Kohoutek	23; 21	21; 10
5	(France) (Czech Republic)	Erwin Kehlhoffner / Thomas Quéré; Petr Koukal / Jan Vondra	21; 19	21; 17

== Group 5 ==
Pos	Team	Pld	W	L	MF	MA	MD	GF	GA	GD	PF	PA	PD	Pts	Qualification	Netherlands	Spain	Norway	Greece
1	Netherlands	3	3	0	12	3	+9	28	6	+22	684	436	+248	3	Knockout stage	—	3–2	5–0	5–0
2	Spain	3	2	1	11	4	+7	23	11	+12	651	558	+93	2			—	4–1	5–0
3	Norway	3	1	2	6	9	−3	15	20	−5	637	594	+43	1				—	5–0
4	Greece (H)	3	0	3	1	14	−13	1	30	−29	265	649	−384	0					—

Source: BWF
(H) Host

=== Netherlands vs. Greece ===
Netherlands
5
Alexandreio Melathron, Main Court 3
14 February 2006, 09:00 UTC+3

Greece
0

			1	2	3
1	(Netherlands) (Greece)	Dicky Palyama; Georgios Charalambidis	21; 5	21; 6
2	(Netherlands) (Greece)	Eric Pang; Panagiotis Skarlatos	21; 4	21; 5
3	(Netherlands) (Greece)	Rune Massing; Christos Tsartsidis	21; 3	21; 5
4	(Netherlands) (Greece)	Ruud Bosch / Jurgen Wouters; Evangelos Kambadais / Doukas Antoniou	21; 4	21; 5
5	(Netherlands) (Greece)	Koen Ridder / Jorrit de Ruiter; Georgios Charalambidis / Christos Tsartsidis	21; 13	21; 8

=== Norway vs. Spain ===
Norway
1
Alexandreio Melathron, Main Court 4
14 February 2006, 09:00 UTC+3

Spain
4

			1	2	3
1	(Norway) (Spain)	Jim Ronny Andersen; Carlos Longo	20; 22	21; 12	21; 16
2	(Norway) (Spain)	Steinar Klausen; Pablo Abián	19; 21	21; 19	18; 21
3	(Norway) (Spain)	Hallstein Oma; José Antonio Crespo	20; 22	15; 21
4	(Norway) (Spain)	Lars Gunnar Abusdal / Jim Ronny Andersen; Pablo Abián / Nicolás Escartín	18; 21	18; 21
5	(Norway) (Spain)	Steinar Klausen / Erik Rundle; José Antonio Crespo / Carlos Longo	21; 23	19; 21

=== Greece vs. Spain ===
Greece
0
Alexandreio Melathron, Pavilion Court 5
15 February 2006, 09:00 UTC+3

Spain
5

			1	2	3
1	(Greece) (Spain)	Georgios Charalambidis; Carlos Longo	14; 21	13; 21
2	(Greece) (Spain)	Panagiotis Skarlatos; Pablo Abián	15; 21	9; 21
3	(Greece) (Spain)	Doukas Antoniou; Ernesto Velázquez	8; 21	6; 21
4	(Greece) (Spain)	Doukas Antoniou / Evangelos Kambadais; Pablo Abián / Nicolás Escartín	5; 21	10; 21
5	(Greece) (Spain)	Georgios Charalambidis / Panagiotis Skarlatos; José Antonio Crespo / Carlos Longo	11; 21	6; 21

=== Netherlands vs. Norway ===
Netherlands
5
Alexandreio Melathron, Pavilion Court 5
15 February 2006, 17:00 UTC+3

Norway
0

			1	2	3
1	(Netherlands) (Norway)	Dicky Palyama; Steinar Klausen	21; 13	19; 21	21; 15
2	(Netherlands) (Norway)	Eric Pang; Lorentz Aarhus	21; 10	21; 15
3	(Netherlands) (Norway)	Rune Massing; Hallstein Oma	21; 15	21; 8
4	(Netherlands) (Norway)	Eric Pang / Jurgen Wouters; Erik Rundle / Lars Gunnar Abusdal	21; 13	21; 10
5	(Netherlands) (Norway)	Koen Ridder / Jorrit de Ruiter; Jim Ronny Andersen / Steinar Klausen	21; 17	15; 21	21; 19

=== Netherlands vs. Spain ===
Netherlands
3
Alexandreio Melathron, Main Court 3
16 February 2006, 17:00 UTC+3

Spain
2

			1	2	3
1	(Netherlands) (Spain)	Dicky Palyama; Carlos Longo	21; 12	21; 18
2	(Netherlands) (Spain)	Eric Pang; Pablo Abián	21; 17	21; 14
3	(Netherlands) (Spain)	Rune Massing; Nicolás Escartín	21; 16	21; 12
4	(Netherlands) (Spain)	Eric Pang / Jurgen Wouters; Pablo Abián / Nicolás Escartín	21; 10	13; 21	17; 21
5	(Netherlands) (Spain)	Koen Ridder / Jorrit de Ruiter; José Antonio Crespo / Carlos Longo	21; 18	13; 21	19; 21

=== Greece vs. Norway ===
Greece
0
Alexandreio Melathron, Pavilion Court 5
16 February 2006, 17:00 UTC+3

Norway
5

			1	2	3
1	(Greece) (Norway)	Georgios Charalambidis; Jim Ronny Andersen	12; 21	5; 21
2	(Greece) (Norway)	Panagiotis Skarlatos; Steinar Klausen	12; 21	8; 21
3	(Greece) (Norway)	Doukas Antoniou; Lorentz Aarhus	13; 21	10; 21
4	(Greece) (Norway)	Doukas Antoniou / Evangelos Kambadais; Erik Rundle / Lars Gunnar Abusdal	13; 21	14; 21
5	(Greece) (Norway)	Georgios Charalambidis / Panagiotis Skarlatos; Jim Ronny Andersen / Steinar Klausen	21; 19	9; 21	3; 21

== Group 6 ==
Pos	Team	Pld	W	L	MF	MA	MD	GF	GA	GD	PF	PA	PD	Pts	Qualification	England	Bulgaria	Slovenia	Israel
1	England	3	3	0	15	0	+15	30	0	+30	630	327	+303	3	Knockout stage	—	5–0	5–0	5–0
2	Bulgaria	3	2	1	8	7	+1	18	16	+2	601	590	+11	2			—	3–2	5–0
3	Slovenia	3	1	2	7	8	−1	15	18	−3	562	593	−31	1				—	5–0
4	Israel	3	0	3	0	15	−15	1	30	−29	367	650	−283	0					—

Source: BWF

=== England vs. Israel ===
England
5
Alexandreio Melathron, Pavilion Court 1
14 February 2006, 17:00 UTC+3

Israel
0

			1	2	3
1	(England) (Israel)	Andrew Smith; Shai Geffen	21; 11	21; 9
2	(England) (Israel)	Nicholas Kidd; Philip Perlov	21; 7	21; 11
3	(England) (Israel)	Rajiv Ouseph; Anton Kracheny	21; 10	21; 5
4	(England) (Israel)	Anthony Clark / David Lindley; Alexander Bass / Philip Perlov	21; 3	21; 5
5	(England) (Israel)	Ian Palenthorpe / Kristian Roebuck; Anton Kracheny / Misha Zilberman	21; 7	21; 7

=== Bulgaria vs. Slovenia ===
Bulgaria
3
Alexandreio Melathron, Pavilion Court 1
14 February 2006, 17:00 UTC+3

Slovenia
2

			1	2	3
1	(Bulgaria) (Slovenia)	Georgi Petrov; Miha Šepec Jr.	23; 21	21; 9
2	(Bulgaria) (Slovenia)	Krasimir Jankov; Luka Petrič	21; 14	21; 15
3	(Bulgaria) (Slovenia)	Julian Hristov; Aleš Murn	21; 16	11; 21	16; 21
4	(Bulgaria) (Slovenia)	Konstantin Dobrev / Georgi Petrov; Luka Petrič / Miha Šepec Jr.	19; 21	21; 15	21; 16
5	(Bulgaria) (Slovenia)	Blagovest Kisyov / Radoslav Simeonov; Miha Horvat / Aleš Murn	22; 24	21; 10	9; 21

=== Slovenia vs. Israel ===
Slovenia
5
Alexandreio Melathron, Main Court 2
15 February 2006, 13:00 UTC+3

Israel
0

			1	2	3
1	(Slovenia) (Israel)	Miha Šepec Jr. Shai Geffen	21; 18	21; 17
2	(Slovenia) (Israel)	Luka Petrič; Alexander Bass	21; 15	21; 8
3	(Slovenia) (Israel)	Aleš Murn; Misha Zilberman	21; 12	21; 12
4	(Slovenia) (Israel)	Luka Petrič / Matevž Šrekl; Alexander Bass / Shai Geffen	21; 14	21; 19
5	(Slovenia) (Israel)	Miha Horvat / Aleš Murn; Anton Kracheny / Misha Zilberman	21; 12	21; 9

=== England vs. Bulgaria ===
England
5
Alexandreio Melathron, Main Court 1
15 February 2006, 17:00 UTC+3

Bulgaria
0

			1	2	3
1	(England) (Bulgaria)	Aamir Ghaffar; Georgi Petrov	21; 13	21; 9
2	(England) (Bulgaria)	Andrew Smith; Krasimir Jankov	21; 11	21; 5
3	(England) (Bulgaria)	Nicholas Kidd; Radoslav Simeonov	21; 7	21; 18
4	(England) (Bulgaria)	Robert Blair / David Lindley; Konstantin Dobrev / Blagovest Kisyov	21; 12	21; 18
5	(England) (Bulgaria)	Ian Palenthorpe / Kristian Roebuck; Georgi Petrov / Radoslav Simeonov	21; 15	21; 16

=== England vs. Slovenia ===
England
5
Alexandreio Melathron, Main Court 4
16 February 2006, 17:00 UTC+3

Slovenia
0

			1	2	3
1	(England) (Slovenia)	Aamir Ghaffar; Miha Šepec Jr.	21; 18	21; 14
2	(England) (Slovenia)	Andrew Smith; Luka Petrič	21; 17	21; 10
3	(England) (Slovenia)	Rajiv Ouseph; Aleš Murn	21; 13	21; 16
4	(England) (Slovenia)	Robert Blair / Anthony Clark; Luka Petrič / Miha Šepec Jr.	21; 8	21; 12
5	(England) (Slovenia)	David Lindley / Nathan Robertson; Miha Horvat / Aleš Murn	21; 8	21; 12

=== Bulgaria vs. Israel ===
Bulgaria
5
Alexandreio Melathron, Pavilion Court 6
16 February 2006, 17:00 UTC+3

Israel
0

			1	2	3
1	(Bulgaria) (Israel)	Georgi Petrov; Shai Geffen	21; 12	22; 20
2	(Bulgaria) (Israel)	Krasimir Jankov; Alexander Bass	21; 17	21; 9
3	(Bulgaria) (Israel)	Blagovest Kisyov; Misha Zilberman	19; 21	21; 13	21; 7
4	(Bulgaria) (Israel)	Blagovest Kisyov / Konstantin Dobrev; Alexander Bass / Philip Perlov	21; 14	21; 14
5	(Bulgaria) (Israel)	Krasimir Jankov / Radoslav Simeonov; Shai Geffen / Misha Zilberman	21; 19	21; 10

== Group 7 ==
Pos	Team	Pld	W	L	MF	MA	MD	GF	GA	GD	PF	PA	PD	Pts	Qualification	Poland	Russia	Belgium	Estonia
1	Poland	3	3	0	14	1	+13	28	5	+23	676	433	+243	3	Knockout stage	—	5–0	5–0	4–1
2	Russia	3	2	1	8	7	+1	16	18	−2	588	633	−45	2			—	3–2	3–2
3	Belgium	3	1	2	6	9	−3	13	19	−6	540	599	−59	1				—	4–1
4	Estonia	3	0	3	2	13	−11	9	24	−15	518	657	−139	0					—

Source: BWF

=== Russia vs. Belgium ===
Russia
3
Alexandreio Melathron, Main Court 4
14 February 2006, 13:00 UTC+3

Belgium
2

			1	2	3
1	(Russia) (Belgium)	Nikolaj Nikolaenko; David Jaco	21; 19	21; 19
2	(Russia) (Belgium)	Alexandr Russkikh; Lionel Warnotte	21; 15	21; 12
3	(Russia) (Belgium)	Mikhail Sivenkov; Wouter Claes	15; 21	17; 21
4	(Russia) (Belgium)	Nikolaj Nikolaenko / Alexandr Russkikh; Wouter Claes / Frédéric Mawet	21; 16	24; 22
5	(Russia) (Belgium)	Nikita Kolomnin / Mikhail Sivenkov; Frédéric Gaspard / David Jaco	18; 21	17; 21

=== Poland vs. Estonia ===
Poland
4
Alexandreio Melathron, Main Court 3
14 February 2006, 17:00 UTC+3

Estonia
1

			1	2	3
1	(Poland) (Estonia)	Przemysław Wacha; Raul Must	14; 21	17; 21
2	(Poland) (Estonia)	Rafał Hawel; Tauno Tooming	21; 17	21; 16
3	(Poland) (Estonia)	Adam Cwalina; Ants Mängel	21; 15	21; 7
4	(Poland) (Estonia)	Michał Łogosz / Robert Mateusiak; Indrek Küüts / Meelis Maiste	21; 6	21; 15
5	(Poland) (Estonia)	Łukasz Moreń / Wojciech Szkudlarczyk; Ants Mängel / Raul Must	21; 11	21; 17

=== Poland vs. Russia ===
Poland
5
Alexandreio Melathron, Pavilion Court 6
15 February 2006, 13:00 UTC+3

Russia
0

			1	2	3
1	(Poland) (Russia)	Przemysław Wacha; Nikolaj Nikolaenko	21; 12	21; 8
2	(Poland) (Russia)	Rafał Hawel; Nikita Kolomnin	21; 10	21; 9
3	(Poland) (Russia)	Adam Cwalina; Mikhail Sivenkov	19; 21	21; 11	21; 14
4	(Poland) (Russia)	Michał Łogosz / Robert Mateusiak; Nikolaj Nikolaenko / Alexandr Russkikh	21; 12	20; 22	21; 9
5	(Poland) (Russia)	Łukasz Moreń / Wojciech Szkudlarczyk; Nikita Kolomnin / Mikhail Sivenkov	21; 10	18; 21	21; 14

=== Belgium vs. Estonia ===
Belgium
4
Alexandreio Melathron, Pavilion Court 6
15 February 2006, 17:00 UTC+3

Estonia
1

			1	2	3
1	(Belgium) (Estonia)	David Jaco; Raul Must	21; 14	21; 10
2	(Belgium) (Estonia)	Lionel Warnotte; Tauno Tooming	21; 16	15; 21	21; 13
3	(Belgium) (Estonia)	Wouter Claes; Ants Mängel	21; 19	21; 11
4	(Belgium) (Estonia)	Wouter Claes / Frédéric Mawet; Indrek Küüts / Meelis Maiste	21; 10	21; 17
5	(Belgium) (Estonia)	Elie Balligand / Frédéric Gaspard; Ants Mängel / Raul Must	22; 20	16; 21	18; 21

=== Russia vs. Estonia ===
Russia
3
Alexandreio Melathron, Pavilion Court 4
16 February 2006, 17:00 UTC+3

Estonia
2

			1	2	3
1	(Russia) (Estonia)	Nikolaj Nikolaenko; Raul Must	21; 14	21; 15
2	(Russia) (Estonia)	Alexandr Russkikh; Tauno Tooming	21; 11	21; 6
3	(Russia) (Estonia)	Mikhail Sivenkov; Ants Mängel	21; 17	20; 22	18; 21
4	(Russia) (Estonia)	Nikolaj Nikolaenko / Alexandr Russkikh; Indrek Küüts / Meelis Maiste	21; 15	21; 16
5	(Russia) (Estonia)	Nikita Kolomnin / Mikhail Sivenkov; Ants Mängel / Raul Must	18; 21	16; 21

=== Poland vs. Belgium ===
Poland
5
Alexandreio Melathron, Pavilion Court 3
16 February 2006, 17:00 UTC+3

Belgium
0

			1	2	3
1	(Poland) (Belgium)	Przemysław Wacha; Elie Balligand	21; 7	21; 6
2	(Poland) (Belgium)	Rafał Hawel; Lionel Warnotte	21; 12	21; 10
3	(Poland) (Belgium)	Adam Cwalina; Frédéric Gaspard	21; 13	21; 14
4	(Poland) (Belgium)	Robert Mateusiak / Wojciech Szkudlarczyk; Wouter Claes / Frédéric Mawet	21; 9	21; 16
5	(Poland) (Belgium)	Adam Cwalina / Przemysław Wacha; Elie Balligand / Frédéric Gaspard	21; 9	21; 18

== Group 8 ==
Pos	Team	Pld	W	L	MF	MA	MD	GF	GA	GD	PF	PA	PD	Pts	Qualification	Ukraine	Sweden	Italy	Switzerland
1	Ukraine	3	3	0	12	3	+9	24	9	+15	649	525	+124	3	Knockout stage	—	3–2	5–0	4–1
2	Sweden	3	2	1	10	5	+5	23	12	+11	677	557	+120	2			—	4–1	4–1
3	Italy	3	1	2	4	11	−7	8	23	−15	474	606	−132	1				—	3–2
4	Switzerland	3	0	3	4	11	−7	12	23	−11	570	682	−112	0					—

Source: BWF

=== Sweden vs. Italy ===
Sweden
4
Alexandreio Melathron, Pavilion Court 5
14 February 2006, 17:00 UTC+3

Italy
1

			1	2	3
1	(Sweden) (Italy)	Magnus Sahlberg; Klaus Raffeiner	15; 21	15; 21
2	(Sweden) (Italy)	Henri Hurskainen; Giovanni Traina	21; 9	21; 10
3	(Sweden) (Italy)	Mattias Wigardt; Paolo Viola	21; 9	21; 6
4	(Sweden) (Italy)	Daniel Glaser / Magnus Sahlberg; Luigi Izzo / Giovanni Traina	21; 13	21; 6
5	(Sweden) (Italy)	Richard Eidestedt / Tim Foo; Klaus Raffeiner / Alexander Theiner	21; 14	21; 13

=== Ukraine vs. Switzerland ===
Ukraine
4
Alexandreio Melathron, Pavilion Court 6
14 February 2006, 17:00 UTC+3

Switzerland
1

			1	2	3
1	(Ukraine) (Switzerland)	Vladislav Druzchenko; Christian Bösiger	21; 15	21; 8
2	(Ukraine) (Switzerland)	Valeriy Atrashchenkov; Oliver Andrey	21; 14	21; 13
3	(Ukraine) (Switzerland)	Dmytro Zavadsky; Michael Andrey	21; 16	21; 10
4	(Ukraine) (Switzerland)	Valeriy Atrashchenkov / Vladislav Druzchenko; Michael Andrey / Christian Bösiger	14; 21	21; 15	21; 14
5	(Ukraine) (Switzerland)	Vitaliy Konov / Dmytro Zavadsky; Philipp Peter / Shane Razi	11; 21	15; 21

=== Ukraine vs. Sweden ===
Ukraine
3
Alexandreio Melathron, Pavilion Court 2
15 February 2006, 13:00 UTC+3

Sweden
2

			1	2	3
1	(Ukraine) (Sweden)	Vladislav Druzchenko; Hugi Heimersson	21; 15	21; 15
2	(Ukraine) (Sweden)	Valeriy Atrashchenkov; Henri Hurskainen	19; 21	13; 21
3	(Ukraine) (Sweden)	Dmytro Zavadsky; Mattias Wigardt	22; 24	21; 16	21; 16
4	(Ukraine) (Sweden)	Valeriy Atrashchenkov / Vladislav Druzchenko; Daniel Glaser / Magnus Sahlberg	21; 15	19; 21	21; 15
5	(Ukraine) (Sweden)	Vitaliy Konov / Dmytro Zavadsky; Richard Eidestedt / Tim Foo	16; 21	16; 21

=== Italy vs. Switzerland ===
Italy
3
Alexandreio Melathron, Pavilion Court 1
15 February 2006, 13:00 UTC+3

Switzerland
2

			1	2	3
1	(Italy) (Switzerland)	Klaus Raffeiner; Christian Bösiger	21; 18	21; 15
2	(Italy) (Switzerland)	Giovanni Traina; Oliver Andrey	16; 21	21; 8	21; 12
3	(Italy) (Switzerland)	Paolo Viola; Shane Razi	13; 21	22; 24
4	(Italy) (Switzerland)	Luigi Izzo / Giovanni Traina; Michael Andrey / Christian Bösiger	19; 21	20; 22
5	(Italy) (Switzerland)	Klaus Raffeiner / Alexander Theiner; Philipp Peter / Shane Razi	21; 19	21; 17

=== Sweden vs. Switzerland ===
Sweden
4
Alexandreio Melathron, Main Court 1
16 February 2006, 09:00 UTC+3

Switzerland
1

			1	2	3
1	(Sweden) (Switzerland)	Hugi Heimersson; Christian Bösiger	21; 14	16; 21	16; 21
2	(Sweden) (Switzerland)	Henri Hurskainen; Oliver Andrey	21; 10	18; 21	21; 14
3	(Sweden) (Switzerland)	Tim Foo; Shane Razi	21; 8	21; 11
4	(Sweden) (Switzerland)	Richard Eidestedt / Tim Foo; Michael Andrey / Christian Bösiger	21; 19	19; 21	21; 16
5	(Sweden) (Switzerland)	Henri Hurskainen / Magnus Sahlberg; Philipp Peter / Shane Razi	21; 12	21; 16

=== Ukraine vs. Italy ===
Ukraine
5
Alexandreio Melathron, Main Court 4
16 February 2006, 09:00 UTC+3

Italy
0

			1	2	3
1	(Ukraine) (Italy)	Vladislav Druzchenko; Klaus Raffeiner	21; 15	21; 16
2	(Ukraine) (Italy)	Valeriy Atrashchenkov; Giovanni Traina	21; 8	21; 11
3	(Ukraine) (Italy)	Vitaliy Konov; Luigi Izzo	21; 16	21; 10
4	(Ukraine) (Italy)	Valeriy Atrashchenkov / Vladislav Druzchenko; Luigi Izzo / Giovanni Traina	21; 16	21; 9
5	(Ukraine) (Italy)	Vitaliy Konov / Dmytro Zavadsky; Klaus Raffeiner / Alexander Theiner	21; 17	21; 18
