= 2006 European Men's Team Badminton Championships knockout stage =

This article lists the full results for knockout stage of 2006 European Men's Team Badminton Championships.

== Bracket ==
Quarter-finals
17 February 2006
Denmark	3
Ukraine	0
France	0
England	3
Netherlands	3
Austria	0
Poland	2
Germany	3

Semi-finals
18 February 2006
Denmark	3
England	0
Netherlands	1
Germany	3

Final
19 February 2006
Denmark	3
Germany	0
Third place
19 February 2006
England	3
Netherlands	1

== Quarter-finals ==
=== Denmark vs. Ukraine ===
Denmark
3
Alexandreio Melathron, Main Court 1
17 February 2006, 16:00 UTC+3

Ukraine
0

			1	2	3
1	(Denmark) (Ukraine)	Peter Gade; Vladislav Druzchenko	21; 9	21; 11
2	(Denmark) (Ukraine)	Kenneth Jonassen; Valeriy Atrashchenkov	21; 9	21; 6
3	(Denmark) (Ukraine)	Niels Christian Kaldau; Dmytro Zavadsky	21; 10	21; 12
4	(Denmark) (Ukraine)	Mathias Boe / Carsten Mogensen; Valeriy Atrashchenkov / Vladislav Druzchenko				not played
5	(Denmark) (Ukraine)	Jonas Rasmussen / Peter Steffensen; Vitaliy Konov / Dmytro Zavadsky				not played

=== England vs. France ===
England
3
Alexandreio Melathron, Main Court 2
17 February 2006, 16:00 UTC+3

France
0

			1	2	3
1	(England) (France)	Aamir Ghaffar; Simon Maunoury	21; 17	21; 19
2	(England) (France)	Andrew Smith; Erwin Kehlhoffner	16; 21	21; 12	21; 11
3	(England) (France)	Robert Blair / Anthony Clark; Mihail Popov / Svetoslav Stoyanov	21; 15	21; 16
4	(England) (France)	Nicholas Kidd; Olivier Fossy				not played
5	(England) (France)	David Lindley / Nathan Robertson; Erwin Kehlhoffner / Thomas Quéré				not played

=== Netherlands vs. Austria ===
Netherlands
3
Alexandreio Melathron, Main Court 3
17 February 2006, 16:00 UTC+3

Austria
0

			1	2	3
1	(Netherlands) (Austria)	Dicky Palyama; Jürgen Koch	21; 11	21; 14
2	(Netherlands) (Austria)	Eric Pang; Heimo Götschl	21; 17	21; 11
3	(Netherlands) (Austria)	Rune Massing; Peter Zauner	21; 17	21; 16
4	(Netherlands) (Austria)	Dicky Palyama / Jurgen Wouters; Heimo Götschl / Michael Lahnsteiner				not played
5	(Netherlands) (Austria)	Eric Pang / Koen Ridder; Jürgen Koch / Peter Zauner				not played

=== Germany vs. Poland ===
Germany
3
Alexandreio Melathron, Main Court 4
17 February 2006, 16:00 UTC+3

Poland
2

			1	2	3
1	(Germany) (Poland)	Björn Joppien; Przemysław Wacha	21; 17	13; 21	16; 21
2	(Germany) (Poland)	Conrad Hückstädt; Rafał Hawel	23; 25	21; 7	21; 6
3	(Germany) (Poland)	Roman Spitko; Adam Cwalina	21; 11	21; 11
4	(Germany) (Poland)	Kristof Hopp / Ingo Kindervater; Michał Łogosz / Robert Mateusiak	21; 17	14; 21	19; 21
5	(Germany) (Poland)	Michael Fuchs / Roman Spitko; Rafał Hawel / Przemysław Wacha	21; 15	22; 24	21; 14

== Semi-finals ==
=== Denmark vs. England ===
Denmark
3
Alexandreio Melathron, Main Court 1
18 February 2006, 16:00 UTC+3

England
0

			1	2	3
1	(Denmark) (England)	Peter Gade; Aamir Ghaffar	21; 13	21; 9
2	(Denmark) (England)	Jens Eriksen / Martin Lundgaard Hansen; Robert Blair / Anthony Clark	16; 21	21; 19	21; 13
3	(Denmark) (England)	Kenneth Jonassen; Nicholas Kidd	21; 7	23; 25	21; 14
4	(Denmark) (England)	Mathias Boe / Carsten Mogensen; David Lindley / Nathan Robertson				not played
5	(Denmark) (England)	Joachim Persson; Rajiv Ouseph				not played

=== Germany vs. Netherlands ===
Germany
3
Alexandreio Melathron, Main Court 2
18 February 2006, 16:00 UTC+3

Netherlands
1

			1	2	3
1	(Germany) (Netherlands)	Björn Joppien; Dicky Palyama	22; 20	19; 21	21; 19
2	(Germany) (Netherlands)	Conrad Hückstädt; Eric Pang	16; 21	19; 21
3	(Germany) (Netherlands)	Roman Spitko; Rune Massing	21; 12	21; 18
4	(Germany) (Netherlands)	Kristof Hopp / Ingo Kindervater; Koen Ridder / Jurgen Wouters	17; 21	21; 9	21; 12
5	(Germany) (Netherlands)	Michael Fuchs / Roman Spitko; Dicky Palyama / Eric Pang				not played

== Third place play-off ==
=== England vs. Netherlands ===
England
3
Alexandreio Melathron, Main Court 2
19 February 2006, 16:00 UTC+3

Netherlands
1

			1	2	3
1	(England) (Netherlands)	Aamir Ghaffar; Dicky Palyama	21; 19	23; 21
2	(England) (Netherlands)	Robert Blair / Anthony Clark; Koen Ridder / Jurgen Wouters	21; 4	21; 4
3	(England) (Netherlands)	Andrew Smith; Eric Pang	14; 21	21; 19	12; 21
4	(England) (Netherlands)	Nicholas Kidd; Rune Massing	21; 16	21; 14
5	(England) (Netherlands)	David Lindley / Nathan Robertson; Dicky Palyama / Eric Pang				not played

== Final ==
=== Denmark vs. Germany ===
Denmark
3
Alexandreio Melathron, Main Court 1
19 February 2006, 16:00 UTC+3

Germany
0

			1	2	3
1	(Denmark) (Germany)	Peter Gade; Björn Joppien	17; 21	21; 15	21; 10
2	(Denmark) (Germany)	Jens Eriksen / Martin Lundgaard Hansen; Kristof Hopp / Ingo Kindervater	21; 16	23; 21
3	(Denmark) (Germany)	Kenneth Jonassen; Roman Spitko	21; 11	21; 15
4	(Denmark) (Germany)	Mathias Boe / Carsten Mogensen; Tim Dettmann / Michael Fuchs				not played
5	(Denmark) (Germany)	Joachim Persson; Marcel Reuter				not played
