= 2006 European Women's Team Badminton Championships group stage =

This article lists the full results for group stage of 2006 European Women's Team Badminton Championships. The group stage was held from 14 to 16 February 2006.

== Group 1 ==
Pos	Team	Pld	W	L	MF	MA	MD	GF	GA	GD	PF	PA	PD	Pts	Qualification	England	Bulgaria	Czech Republic	Cyprus
1	England	3	3	0	14	1	+13	27	3	+24	615	340	+275	3	Knockout stage	—	4–1	5–0	5–0
2	Bulgaria	3	2	1	8	7	+1	17	15	+2	544	528	+16	2			—	3–2	4–1
3	Czech Republic	3	1	2	6	9	−3	10	20	−10	467	561	−94	1				—	4–1
4	Cyprus	3	0	3	2	13	−11	4	20	−16	296	493	−197	0					—

Source: BWF

=== England vs. Cyprus ===
England
5
Alexandreio Melathron, Pavilion Court 1
14 February 2006, 09:00 UTC+3

Cyprus
0

			1	2	3
1	(England) (Cyprus)	Elizabeth Cann; Maria Ioannou	21; 17	21; 9
2	(England) (Cyprus)	Jill Pittard; Dometia Ioannou	21; 5	21; 8
3	(England) (Cyprus)	Julia Mann; Elena Iacovou	21; 2	21; 7
4	(England) (Cyprus)	Joanne Nicholas / Ella Tripp; Dometia Ioannou / Maria Ioannou	21; 14	21; 5
5	(England) (Cyprus)	Suzanne Louis-Lane / Natalie Munt; Alexia Chrysostomou / Elena Iacovou				w/o

==== Bulgaria vs. Czech Republic ====
Bulgaria
3
Alexandreio Melathron, Pavilion Court 4
14 February 2006, 09:00 UTC+3

Czech Republic
2

			1	2	3
1	(Bulgaria) (Czech Republic)	Petya Nedelcheva; Kristína Gavnholt	21; 4	21; 13
2	(Bulgaria) (Czech Republic)	Linda Zetchiri; Eva Brožová	17; 21	21; 14	16; 21
3	(Bulgaria) (Czech Republic)	Diana Dimova; Martina Benešová	21; 13	21; 19
4	(Bulgaria) (Czech Republic)	Maya Dobreva / Linda Zetchiri; Eva Brožová / Kristína Gavnholt	19; 21	23; 21	7; 21
5	(Bulgaria) (Czech Republic)	Diana Dimova / Petya Nedelcheva; Martina Benešová / Hana Kollarová	21; 9	21; 7

==== England vs. Czech Republic ====
England
5
Alexandreio Melathron, Main Court 1
15 February 2006, 09:00 UTC+3

Czech Republic
0

			1	2	3
1	(England) (Czech Republic)	Tracey Hallam; Kristína Gavnholt	21; 13	21; 12
2	(England) (Czech Republic)	Elizabeth Cann; Hana Kollarová	21; 6	21; 9
3	(England) (Czech Republic)	Jill Pittard; Eva Brožová	21; 16	21; 16
4	(England) (Czech Republic)	Gail Emms / Donna Kellogg; Martina Benešová / Hana Kollarová	21; 5	21; 17
5	(England) (Czech Republic)	Suzanne Louis-Lane / Natalie Munt; Eva Brožová / Kristína Gavnholt	21; 7	21; 17

==== Bulgaria vs. Cyprus ====
Bulgaria
4
Alexandreio Melathron, Main Court 2
15 February 2006, 09:00 UTC+3

Cyprus
1

			1	2	3
1	(Bulgaria) (Cyprus)	Linda Zetchiri; Maria Ioannou	21; 19	21; 15
2	(Bulgaria) (Cyprus)	Diana Dimova; Dometia Ioannou	21; 12	21; 4
3	(Bulgaria) (Cyprus)	Gabriela Banova; Alexia Chrysostomou	21; 11	21; 4
4	(Bulgaria) (Cyprus)	Maya Dobreva / Linda Zetchiri; Dometia Ioannou / Maria Ioannou	16; 21	18; 21
5	(Bulgaria) (Cyprus)	Gabriela Banova / Diana Dimova; Alexia Chrysostomou / Elena Iacovou				w/o

==== England vs. Bulgaria ====
England
5
Alexandreio Melathron, Main Court 2
16 February 2006, 09:00 UTC+3

Bulgaria
0

			1	2	3
1	(England) (Bulgaria)	Tracey Hallam; Petya Nedelcheva	21; 18	21; 13
2	(England) (Bulgaria)	Jill Pittard; Linda Zetchiri	21; 15	14; 21	18; 21
3	(England) (Bulgaria)	Julia Mann; Diana Dimova	16; 21	21; 6	21; 2
4	(England) (Bulgaria)	Joanne Nicholas / Ella Tripp; Maya Dobreva / Atanaska Spasova	21; 12	21; 17
5	(England) (Bulgaria)	Gail Emms / Donna Kellogg; Diana Dimova / Petya Nedelcheva	21; 11	21; 8

==== Czech Republic vs. Cyprus ====
Czech Republic
4
Alexandreio Melathron, Pavilion Court 1
16 February 2006, 09:00 UTC+3

Cyprus
1

			1	2	3
1	(Czech Republic) (Cyprus)	Kristína Gavnholt; Maria Ioannou	21; 19	21; 16
2	(Czech Republic) (Cyprus)	Eva Brožová; Dometia Ioannou	21; 18	21; 8
3	(Czech Republic) (Cyprus)	Martina Benešová; Alexia Chrysostomou	21; 8	21; 9
4	(Czech Republic) (Cyprus)	Maya Dobreva / Linda Zetchiri; Dometia Ioannou / Maria Ioannou	18; 21	21; 23
5	(Czech Republic) (Cyprus)	Eva Brožová / Kristína Gavnholt; Alexia Chrysostomou / Elena Iacovou				w/o

== Group 2 ==
Pos	Team	Pld	W	L	MF	MA	MD	GF	GA	GD	PF	PA	PD	Pts	Qualification	Germany	Poland	Belarus	Turkey
1	Germany	3	3	0	14	1	+13	29	2	+27	650	339	+311	3	Knockout stage	—	5–0	5–0	5–0
2	Poland	3	2	1	8	7	+1	17	15	+2	538	566	−28	2			—	3–2	5–0
3	Belarus	3	1	2	8	7	+1	17	17	0	600	588	+12	1				—	5–0
4	Turkey	3	0	3	0	15	−15	1	30	−29	354	649	−295	0					—

Source: BWF

=== Germany vs. Belarus ===
Germany
4
Alexandreio Melathron, Main Court 2
14 February 2006, 17:00 UTC+3

Belarus
1

			1	2	3
1	(Germany) (Belarus)	Huaiwen Xu; Maria Kizil	21; 10	21; 6
2	(Germany) (Belarus)	Juliane Schenk; Olga Konon	21; 17	21; 17
3	(Germany) (Belarus)	Petra Overzier; Vlada Chernyavskaya	21; 9	21; 13
4	(Germany) (Belarus)	Nicole Grether / Juliane Schenk; Maria Kizil / Alesia Zaitsava	21; 2	21; 12
5	(Germany) (Belarus)	Sandra Marinello / Kathrin Piotrowski; Vlada Chernyavskaya / Olga Konon	22; 24	21; 12	17; 21

==== Poland vs. Turkey ====
Poland
5
Alexandreio Melathron, Main Court 4
14 February 2006, 17:00 UTC+3

Turkey
0

			1	2	3
1	(Poland) (Turkey)	Kamila Augustyn; Nursel Aydoğmuş	21; 11	21; 11
2	(Poland) (Turkey)	Nadieżda Kostiuczyk; Ezgi Epice	21; 10	21; 4
3	(Poland) (Turkey)	Angelika Węgrzyn; Hatice Nurgül Sen	21; 17	21; 14
4	(Poland) (Turkey)	Kamila Augustyn / Nadieżda Kostiuczyk; Nursel Aydoğmuş / Ezgi Epice	21; 19	21; 8
5	(Poland) (Turkey)	Małgorzata Kurdelska / Paulina Matusewicz; Öznur Çalışkan / Rabia Kemer	21; 13	21; 19

==== Germany vs. Turkey ====
Germany
5
Alexandreio Melathron, Pavilion Court 5
15 February 2006, 13:00 UTC+3

Turkey
0

			1	2	3
1	(Germany) (Turkey)	Huaiwen Xu; Nursel Aydoğmuş	21; 11	21; 8
2	(Germany) (Turkey)	Juliane Schenk; Ezgi Epice	21; 7	21; 6
3	(Germany) (Turkey)	Petra Overzier; Öznur Çalışkan	21; 6	21; 10
4	(Germany) (Turkey)	Birgit Overzier / Michaela Peiffer; Nursel Aydoğmuş / Ezgi Epice	21; 10	21; 14
5	(Germany) (Turkey)	Sandra Marinello / Carina Mette; Öznur Çalışkan / Rabia Kemer	21; 6	21; 8

==== Poland vs. Belarus ====
Poland
3
Alexandreio Melathron, Pavilion Court 4
15 February 2006, 17:00 UTC+3

Belarus
2

			1	2	3
1	(Poland) (Belarus)	Małgorzata Kurdelska; Maria Kizil	11; 21	13; 21
2	(Poland) (Belarus)	Nadieżda Kostiuczyk; Olga Konon	21; 18	19; 21	21; 16
3	(Poland) (Belarus)	Angelika Węgrzyn; Vlada Chernyavskaya	12; 21	22; 20	13; 21
4	(Poland) (Belarus)	Kamila Augustyn / Paulina Matusewicz; Maria Kizil / Alesia Zaitsava	23; 21	21; 19
5	(Poland) (Belarus)	Nadieżda Kostiuczyk / Angelika Węgrzyn; Vlada Chernyavskaya / Olga Konon	21; 15	21; 14

==== Germany vs. Poland ====
Germany
5
Alexandreio Melathron, Main Court 2
16 February 2006, 13:00 UTC+3

Poland
0

			1	2	3
1	(Germany) (Poland)	Huaiwen Xu; Małgorzata Kurdelska	21; 3	21; 9
2	(Germany) (Poland)	Juliane Schenk; Nadieżda Kostiuczyk	21; 15	21; 10
3	(Germany) (Poland)	Petra Overzier; Angelika Węgrzyn	21; 8	21; 10
4	(Germany) (Poland)	Nicole Grether / Juliane Schenk; Kamila Augustyn / Nadieżda Kostiuczyk	23; 21	21; 14
5	(Germany) (Poland)	Birgit Overzier / Kathrin Piotrowski; Paulina Matusewicz / Angelika Węgrzyn	21; 14	21; 6

==== Belarus vs. Turkey ====
Belarus
5
Alexandreio Melathron, Pavilion Court 6
16 February 2006, 13:00 UTC+3

Turkey
0

			1	2	3
1	(Belarus) (Turkey)	Maria Kizil; Nursel Aydoğmuş	21; 10	21; 12
2	(Belarus) (Turkey)	Olga Konon; Ezgi Epice	21; 7	21; 8
3	(Belarus) (Turkey)	Vlada Chernyavskaya; Öznur Çalışkan	19; 21	21; 16	21; 8
4	(Belarus) (Turkey)	Maria Kizil / Alesia Zaitsava; Nursel Aydoğmuş / Ezgi Epice	21; 19	21; 19
5	(Belarus) (Turkey)	Vlada Chernyavskaya / Olga Konon; Öznur Çalışkan / Rabia Kemer	21; 15	21; 7

== Group 3 ==
Pos	Team	Pld	W	L	MF	MA	MD	GF	GA	GD	PF	PA	PD	Pts	Qualification	Scotland	Ukraine	Finland	Iceland
1	Scotland	3	3	0	12	3	+9	24	7	+17	623	449	+174	3	Knockout stage	—	4–1	3–2	5–0
2	Ukraine	3	2	1	9	6	+3	21	13	+8	635	576	+59	2			—	3–2	5–0
3	Finland	3	1	2	7	8	−1	15	19	−4	583	604	−21	1				—	3–2
4	Iceland	3	0	3	2	13	−11	6	27	−21	458	670	−212	0					—

Source: BWF

=== Ukraine vs. Finland ===
Ukraine
3
Alexandreio Melathron, Pavilion Court 6
14 February 2006, 09:00 UTC+3

Finland
2

			1	2	3
1	(Ukraine) (Finland)	Larisa Griga; Anu Nieminen	9; 21	21; 16	7; 21
2	(Ukraine) (Finland)	Elena Nozdran; Nina Weckström	21; 14	21; 10
3	(Ukraine) (Finland)	Mariya Diptan; Elina Väisänen	21; 13	21; 17
4	(Ukraine) (Finland)	Larisa Griga / Elena Nozdran; Anu Nieminen / Nina Weckström	21; 15	21; 15
5	(Ukraine) (Finland)	Mariya Diptan / Elena Prus; Elina Väisänen / Noora Virta	21; 15	18; 21	13; 21

==== Scotland vs. Iceland ====
Scotland
5
Alexandreio Melathron, Pavilion Court 1
14 February 2006, 13:00 UTC+3

Iceland
0

			1	2	3
1	(Scotland) (Iceland)	Susan Hughes; Katrín Atladóttir	21; 6	21; 11
2	(Scotland) (Iceland)	Yuan Wemyss; Tinna Helgadóttir	21; 14	21; 15
3	(Scotland) (Iceland)	Linda Sloan; Halldóra Elín Jóhannsdóttir	21; 9	21; 9
4	(Scotland) (Iceland)	Imogen Bankier / Emma Mason; Katrín Atladóttir / Snjólaug Jóhannsdóttir	21; 8	21; 10
5	(Scotland) (Iceland)	Michelle Douglas / Yuan Wemyss; Tinna Helgadóttir / Halldóra Elín Jóhannsdóttir	21; 15	21; 8

==== Scotland vs. Ukraine ====
Scotland
4
Alexandreio Melathron, Pavilion Court 4
15 February 2006, 09:00 UTC+3

Ukraine
1

			1	2	3
1	(Scotland) (Ukraine)	Susan Hughes; Larisa Griga	21; 13	21; 15
2	(Scotland) (Ukraine)	Yuan Wemyss; Elena Nozdran	17; 21	21; 17	21; 15
3	(Scotland) (Ukraine)	Linda Sloan; Mariya Diptan	20; 22	17; 21
4	(Scotland) (Ukraine)	Imogen Bankier / Emma Mason; Mariya Diptan / Elena Nozdran	21; 19	21; 14
5	(Scotland) (Ukraine)	Michelle Douglas / Yuan Wemyss; Larisa Griga / Elena Prus	21; 19	21; 14

==== Finland vs. Iceland ====
Finland
3
Alexandreio Melathron, Pavilion Court 4
15 February 2006, 13:00 UTC+3

Iceland
2

			1	2	3
1	(Finland) (Iceland)	Anu Nieminen; Katrín Atladóttir	21; 15	21; 18
2	(Finland) (Iceland)	Nina Weckström; Tinna Helgadóttir	21; 15	15; 21	19; 21
3	(Finland) (Iceland)	Elina Väisänen; Halldóra Elín Jóhannsdóttir	19; 21	21; 13	21; 9
4	(Finland) (Iceland)	Anu Nieminen / Nina Weckström; Katrín Atladóttir / Snjólaug Jóhannsdóttir	17; 21	13; 21
5	(Finland) (Iceland)	Elina Väisänen / Noora Virta; Tinna Helgadóttir / Halldóra Elín Jóhannsdóttir	21; 14	21; 9

==== Ukraine vs. Iceland ====
Ukraine
5
Alexandreio Melathron, Main Court 3
16 February 2006, 09:00 UTC+3

Iceland
0

			1	2	3
1	(Ukraine) (Iceland)	Elena Nozdran; Katrín Atladóttir	21; 8	21; 9
2	(Ukraine) (Iceland)	Mariya Diptan; Tinna Helgadóttir	19; 21	22; 20	21; 13
3	(Ukraine) (Iceland)	Elena Prus; Halldóra Elín Jóhannsdóttir	21; 15	21; 8
4	(Ukraine) (Iceland)	Larisa Griga / Elena Nozdran; Katrín Atladóttir / Tinna Helgadóttir	21; 18	21; 18
5	(Ukraine) (Iceland)	Mariya Diptan / Elena Prus; Snjólaug Jóhannsdóttir / Halldóra Elín Jóhannsdóttir	21; 10	21; 15

==== Scotland vs. Finland ====
Scotland
3
Alexandreio Melathron, Main Court 3
16 February 2006, 13:00 UTC+3

Finland
2

			1	2	3
1	(Scotland) (Finland)	Susan Hughes; Anu Nieminen	15; 21	19; 21
2	(Scotland) (Finland)	Yuan Wemyss; Elena Nozdran	21; 10	21; 10
3	(Scotland) (Finland)	Linda Sloan; Elina Väisänen	19; 21	12; 21
4	(Scotland) (Finland)	Imogen Bankier / Emma Mason; Anu Nieminen / Nina Weckström	21; 12	21; 11
5	(Scotland) (Finland)	Michelle Douglas / Yuan Wemyss; Elina Väisänen / Noora Virta	21; 19	21; 8

== Group 4 ==
Pos	Team	Pld	W	L	MF	MA	MD	GF	GA	GD	PF	PA	PD	Pts	Qualification	Denmark	Portugal	Spain	Slovakia
1	Denmark	3	3	0	15	0	+15	30	2	+28	666	382	+284	3	Knockout stage	—	5–0	5–0	5–0
2	Portugal	3	2	1	9	6	+3	20	13	+7	595	553	+42	2			—	5–0	4–1
3	Spain	3	1	2	3	12	−9	9	26	−17	545	669	−124	1				—	3–2
4	Slovakia	3	0	3	3	12	−9	8	26	−18	462	664	−202	0					—

Source: BWF

=== Denmark vs. Slovakia ===
Denmark
5
Alexandreio Melathron, Main Court 1
14 February 2006, 13:00 UTC+3

Slovakia
0

			1	2	3
1	(Denmark) (Slovakia)	Tine Høy; Eva Sládeková	21; 11	21; 13
2	(Denmark) (Slovakia)	Camilla Sørensen; Kvetoslava Orlovská	21; 11	21; 4
3	(Denmark) (Slovakia)	Anne Marie Pedersen; Zuzana Orlovská	21; 4	21; 8
4	(Denmark) (Slovakia)	Kamilla Rytter Juhl / Lena Frier Kristiansen; Maria Bednářová / Eva Sládeková	21; 6	21; 7
5	(Denmark) (Slovakia)	Britta Andersen / Mette Schjoldager; Kvetoslava Orlovská / Zuzana Orlovská	21; 6	21; 5

==== Spain vs. Portugal ====
Spain
0
Alexandreio Melathron, Main Court 2
14 February 2006, 13:00 UTC+3

Portugal
5

			1	2	3
1	(Spain) (Portugal)	Yoana Martínez; Telma Santos	21; 6	10; 21	12; 21
2	(Spain) (Portugal)	Lucía Tavera; Filipa Lamy	19; 21	9; 21
3	(Spain) (Portugal)	Anabel Chafer Muñoz; Ana Moura	11; 21	21; 23
4	(Spain) (Portugal)	Inmaculada Aparicio / Silvia Riera; Vânia Leça / Telma Santos	16; 21	10; 21
5	(Spain) (Portugal)	Anabel Chafer Muñoz / Lucía Tavera; Tânia Faria / Filipa Lamy	16; 21	16; 21

==== Spain vs. Slovakia ====
Spain
3
Alexandreio Melathron, Pavilion Court 6
15 February 2006, 09:00 UTC+3

Slovakia
2

			1	2	3
1	(Spain) (Slovakia)	Yoana Martínez; Eva Sládeková	21; 17	18; 21	21; 11
2	(Spain) (Slovakia)	Lucía Tavera; Kvetoslava Orlovská	21; 16	16; 21	21; 12
3	(Spain) (Slovakia)	Anabel Chafer Muñoz; Zuzana Orlovská	21; 15	9; 21	15; 21
4	(Spain) (Slovakia)	Inmaculada Aparicio / Yoana Martínez; Maria Bednářová / Eva Sládeková	21; 10	21; 14
5	(Spain) (Slovakia)	Anabel Chafer Muñoz / Lucía Tavera; Kvetoslava Orlovská / Zuzana Orlovská	15; 21	15; 21

==== Denmark vs. Portugal ====
Denmark
5
Alexandreio Melathron, Pavilion Court 3
15 February 2006, 13:00 UTC+3

Portugal
0

			1	2	3
1	(Denmark) (Portugal)	Camilla Sørensen; Telma Santos	21; 14	21; 17
2	(Denmark) (Portugal)	Nanna Brosolat Jensen; Filipa Lamy	22; 20	13; 21	21; 14
3	(Denmark) (Portugal)	Anne Marie Pedersen; Ana Moura	23; 21	21; 11
4	(Denmark) (Portugal)	Pernille Harder / Mette Schjoldager; Tânia Faria / Filipa Lamy	21; 9	21; 12
5	(Denmark) (Portugal)	Kamilla Rytter Juhl / Lena Frier Kristiansen; Vânia Leça / Telma Santos	21; 15	21; 4

==== Denmark vs. Spain ====
Denmark
5
Alexandreio Melathron, Pavilion Court 3
16 February 2006, 09:00 UTC+3

Spain
0

			1	2	3
1	(Denmark) (Spain)	Tine Høy; Yoana Martínez	19; 21	22; 20	21; 17
2	(Denmark) (Spain)	Nanna Brosolat Jensen; Lucía Tavera	21; 8	21; 18
3	(Denmark) (Spain)	Anne Marie Pedersen; Silvia Riera	21; 11	21; 10
4	(Denmark) (Spain)	Pernille Harder / Lena Frier Kristiansen; Inmaculada Aparicio / Anabel Chafer Muñoz	21; 13	21; 8
5	(Denmark) (Spain)	Britta Andersen / Mette Schjoldager; Yoana Martínez / Lucía Tavera	21; 15	21; 8

==== Portugal vs. Slovakia ====
Portugal
4
Alexandreio Melathron, Pavilion Court 4
16 February 2006, 09:00 UTC+3

Slovakia
1

			1	2	3
1	(Portugal) (Slovakia)	Telma Santos; Eva Sládeková	16; 21	21; 15	14; 21
2	(Portugal) (Slovakia)	Filipa Lamy; Kvetoslava Orlovská	21; 19	21; 12
3	(Portugal) (Slovakia)	Ana Moura; Zuzana Orlovská	21; 16	21; 7
4	(Portugal) (Slovakia)	Vânia Leça / Telma Santos; Maria Bednářová / Eva Sládeková	21; 12	21; 16
5	(Portugal) (Slovakia)	Tânia Faria / Filipa Lamy; Kvetoslava Orlovská / Zuzana Orlovská	21; 18	21; 9

== Group 5 ==
Pos	Team	Pld	W	L	MF	MA	MD	GF	GA	GD	PF	PA	PD	Pts	Qualification	Netherlands	Estonia	Ireland	Austria
1	Netherlands	3	3	0	15	0	+15	30	1	+29	651	307	+344	3	Knockout stage	—	5–0	5–0	5–0
2	Estonia	3	2	1	8	7	+1	16	18	−2	548	639	−91	2			—	5–0	3–2
3	Ireland	3	1	2	3	12	−9	10	25	−15	513	686	−173	1				—	3–2
4	Austria	3	0	3	4	11	−7	10	22	−12	526	606	−80	0					—

Source: BWF

=== Netherlands vs. Ireland ===
Netherlands
5
Alexandreio Melathron, Pavilion Court 5
14 February 2006, 13:00 UTC+3

Ireland
0

			1	2	3
1	(Netherlands) (Republic of Ireland)	Mia Audina; Keelin Fox	21; 2	21; 5
2	(Netherlands) (Republic of Ireland)	Yao Jie; Ruth Kilkenny	21; 8	21; 7
3	(Netherlands) (Republic of Ireland)	Judith Meulendijks; Chloe Magee	21; 9	21; 7
4	(Netherlands) (Republic of Ireland)	Karina de Wit / Lotte Jonathans; Keelin Fox / Ruth Kilkenny	21; 8	21; 3
5	(Netherlands) (Republic of Ireland)	Brenda Beenhakker / Rachel van Cutsen; Bing Huang / Chloe Magee	21; 23	21; 19	21; 17

==== Austria vs. Estonia ====
Austria
2
Alexandreio Melathron, Pavilion Court 6
14 February 2006, 13:00 UTC+3

Estonia
3

			1	2	3
1	(Austria) (Estonia)	Simone Prutsch; Kati Tolmoff	14; 21	16; 21
2	(Austria) (Estonia)	Claudia Mayer; Piret Hamer	19; 21	21; 23
3	(Austria) (Estonia)	Miriam Gruber; Kai-Riin Saluste	20; 22	21; 13	18; 21
4	(Austria) (Estonia)	Sabine Franz / Simone Prutsch; Sandra Kamilova / Kati Tolmoff	21; 18	21; 13
5	(Austria) (Estonia)	Miriam Gruber / Tina Riedl; Piret Hamer / Helen Reino	21; 19	21; 15

==== Netherlands vs. Estonia ====
Netherlands
0
Alexandreio Melathron, Main Court 3
15 February 2006, 13:00 UTC+3

Estonia
5

			1	2	3
1	(Netherlands) (Estonia)	Mia Audina; Kati Tolmoff	21; 5	21; 6
2	(Netherlands) (Estonia)	Judith Meulendijks; Piret Hamer	21; 14	21; 4
3	(Netherlands) (Estonia)	Karina de Wit; Kai-Riin Saluste	21; 8	21; 8
4	(Netherlands) (Estonia)	Brenda Beenhakker / Paulien van Dooremalen; Sandra Kamilova / Kati Tolmoff	21; 8	21; 6
5	(Netherlands) (Estonia)	Lotte Jonathans / Yao Jie; Piret Hamer / Helen Reino	21; 13	21; 11

==== Austria vs. Ireland ====
Austria
2
Alexandreio Melathron, Main Court 4
15 February 2006, 13:00 UTC+3

Ireland
3

			1	2	3
1	(Austria) (Republic of Ireland)	Simone Prutsch; Ruth Kilkenny	21; 8	21; 13
2	(Austria) (Republic of Ireland)	Claudia Mayer; Keelin Fox	17; 21	16; 21
3	(Austria) (Republic of Ireland)	Miriam Gruber; Chloe Magee	21; 15	14; 21	19; 21
4	(Austria) (Republic of Ireland)	Miriam Gruber / Tina Riedl; Keelin Fox / Ruth Kilkenny	21; 16	21; 11
5	(Austria) (Republic of Ireland)	Sabine Franz / Simone Prutsch; Bing Huang / Chloe Magee	17; 21	9; 21

==== Netherlands vs. Austria ====
Netherlands
5
Alexandreio Melathron, Pavilion Court 5
16 February 2006, 09:00 UTC+3

Austria
0

			1	2	3
1	(Netherlands) (Austria)	Yao Jie; Simone Prutsch	21; 9	21; 19
2	(Netherlands) (Austria)	Rachel van Cutsen; Claudia Mayer	21; 17	21; 9
3	(Netherlands) (Austria)	Karina de Wit; Miriam Gruber	21; 13	21; 6
4	(Netherlands) (Austria)	Brenda Beenhakker / Judith Meulendijks; Sabine Franz / Simone Prutsch	21; 15	21; 8
5	(Netherlands) (Austria)	Mia Audina / Lotte Jonathans; Miriam Gruber / Tina Riedl	21; 13	21; 7

==== Estonia vs. Ireland ====
Estonia
5
Alexandreio Melathron, Pavilion Court 6
16 February 2006, 09:00 UTC+3

Ireland
0

			1	2	3
1	(Estonia) (Republic of Ireland)	Kati Tolmoff; Ruth Kilkenny	21; 12	21; 12
2	(Estonia) (Republic of Ireland)	Piret Hamer; Keelin Fox	19; 21	21; 19	21; 13
3	(Estonia) (Republic of Ireland)	Kai-Riin Saluste; Chloe Magee	21; 11	23; 21
4	(Estonia) (Republic of Ireland)	Piret Hamer / Helen Reino; Keelin Fox / Ruth Kilkenny	13; 21	21; 13	21; 12
5	(Estonia) (Republic of Ireland)	Sandra Kamilova / Kati Tolmoff; Bing Huang / Chloe Magee	21; 17	10; 21	25; 23

== Group 6 ==
Pos	Team	Pld	W	L	MF	MA	MD	GF	GA	GD	PF	PA	PD	Pts	Qualification	France	Slovenia	Switzerland	Wales
1	France	3	3	0	14	1	+13	29	4	+25	673	411	+262	3	Knockout stage	—	4–1	5–0	5–0
2	Slovenia	3	2	1	9	6	+3	20	13	+7	592	509	+83	2			—	3–2	5–0
3	Switzerland	3	1	2	7	8	−1	15	17	−2	552	511	+41	1				—	5–0
4	Wales	3	0	3	0	15	−15	0	30	−30	244	630	−386	0					—

Source: BWF

=== Switzerland vs. Slovenia ===
Switzerland
2
Alexandreio Melathron, Main Court 3
14 February 2006, 13:00 UTC+3

Slovenia
3

			1	2	3
1	(Switzerland) (Slovenia)	Jeanine Cicognini; Maja Kersnik	21; 10	21; 12
2	(Switzerland) (Slovenia)	Corinne Jörg; Maja Tvrdy	16; 21	18; 21
3	(Switzerland) (Slovenia)	Monika Fischer; Urška Silvester	13; 21	10; 21
4	(Switzerland) (Slovenia)	Jeanine Cicognini / Tenzin Pelling; Maja Kersnik / Maja Tvrdy	17; 21	23; 21	21; 15
5	(Switzerland) (Slovenia)	Marion Gruber / Corinne Jörg; Maja Pohar / Urška Silvester	11; 21	18; 21

==== France vs. Wales ====
France
5
Alexandreio Melathron, Main Court 1
14 February 2006, 17:00 UTC+3

Wales
0

			1	2	3
1	(France) (Wales)	Pi Hongyan; Carissa Turner	21; 3	21; 7
2	(France) (Wales)	Perrine Le Buhanic; Rachel Thomas	21; 19	21; 10
3	(France) (Wales)	Émilie Despierres; Rachel Madely	21; 3	21; 2
4	(France) (Wales)	Élisa Chanteur / Élodie Eymard; Rachel Thomas / Carissa Turner	21; 9	21; 15
5	(France) (Wales)	Laura Choinet / Pi Hongyan; Kelly Blake / Caroline Harvey	21; 4	21; 9

==== France vs. Slovenia ====
France
5
Alexandreio Melathron, Pavilion Court 1
15 February 2006, 17:00 UTC+3

Slovenia
0

			1	2	3
1	(France) (Slovenia)	Pi Hongyan; Maja Kersnik	21; 9	21; 14
2	(France) (Slovenia)	Perrine Le Buhanic; Maja Tvrdy	21; 15	16; 21	16; 21
3	(France) (Slovenia)	Weny Rahmawati; Maja Pohar	21; 13	21; 13
4	(France) (Slovenia)	Élodie Eymard / Weny Rahmawati; Maja Kersnik / Maja Tvrdy	21; 16	11; 21	21; 13
5	(France) (Slovenia)	Laura Choinet / Pi Hongyan; Maja Pohar / Urška Silvester	21; 15	21; 6

==== Switzerland vs. Wales ====
Switzerland
5
Alexandreio Melathron, Pavilion Court 2
15 February 2006, 17:00 UTC+3

Wales
0

			1	2	3
1	(Switzerland) (Wales)	Jeanine Cicognini; Carissa Turner	21; 7	21; 6
2	(Switzerland) (Wales)	Corinne Jörg; Rachel Thomas	21; 14	21; 5
3	(Switzerland) (Wales)	Monika Fischer; Caroline Harvey	21; 5	21; 11
4	(Switzerland) (Wales)	Jeanine Cicognini / Tenzin Pelling; Rachel Thomas / Carissa Turner	21; 2	21; 10
5	(Switzerland) (Wales)	Marion Gruber / Corinne Jörg; Kelly Blake / Rachel Madely	11; 6	18; 9

==== France vs. Switzerland ====
France
5
Alexandreio Melathron, Pavilion Court 3
16 February 2006, 13:00 UTC+3

Switzerland
0

			1	2	3
1	(France) (Switzerland)	Pi Hongyan; Jeanine Cicognini	21; 12	21; 9
2	(France) (Switzerland)	Perrine Le Buhanic; Monika Fischer	21; 15	21; 19
3	(France) (Switzerland)	Émilie Despierres; Tenzin Pelling	19; 21	21; 4	21; 8
4	(France) (Switzerland)	Élisa Chanteur / Laura Choinet; Marion Gruber / Corinne Jörg	21; 15	21; 16
5	(France) (Switzerland)	Élodie Eymard / Weny Rahmawati; Jeanine Cicognini / Tenzin Pelling	21; 13	23; 21

==== Wales vs. Slovenia ====
Wales
0
Alexandreio Melathron, Pavilion Court 4
16 February 2006, 13:00 UTC+3

Slovenia
5

			1	2	3
1	(Wales) (Slovenia)	Carissa Turner; Maja Kersnik	7; 21	6; 21
2	(Wales) (Slovenia)	Rachel Thomas; Maja Tvrdy	15; 21	11; 21
3	(Wales) (Slovenia)	Kelly Blake; Urška Silvester	4; 21	7; 21
4	(Wales) (Slovenia)	Caroline Harvey / Rachel Thomas; Maja Pohar / Maja Tvrdy	9; 21	5; 21
5	(Wales) (Slovenia)	Rachel Thomas / Carissa Turner; Maja Kersnik / Urška Silvester	11; 21	13; 21

== Group 7 ==
Pos	Team	Pld	W	L	MF	MA	MD	GF	GA	GD	PF	PA	PD	Pts	Qualification	Sweden	Italy	Greece
1	Sweden	2	2	0	10	0	+10	20	0	+20	421	178	+243	2	Knockout stage	—	5–0	5–0
2	Italy	2	1	1	4	6	−2	9	13	−4	362	391	−29	1			—	4–1
3	Greece (H)	2	0	2	1	9	−8	3	19	−16	240	454	−214	0				—

Source: BWF
(H) Host

=== Sweden vs. Italy ===
Sweden
5
Alexandreio Melathron, Pavilion Court 4
14 February 2006, 17:00 UTC+3

Italy
0

			1	2	3
1	(Sweden) (Italy)	Sara Persson; Agnese Allegrini	21; 10	21; 6
2	(Sweden) (Italy)	Elin Bergblom; Verena Leiter	21; 6	22; 20
3	(Sweden) (Italy)	Helene Nystedt; Silene Zoia	21; 10	21; 11
4	(Sweden) (Italy)	Elin Bergblom / Johanna Persson; Agnese Allegrini / Verena Leiter	21; 10	21; 14
5	(Sweden) (Italy)	Emelie Lennartsson / Sophia Hansson; Erika Biagiotti / Silene Zoia	21; 14	21; 17

==== Sweden vs. Greece ====
Sweden
5
Alexandreio Melathron, Main Court 3
15 February 2006, 17:00 UTC+3

Greece
0

			1	2	3
1	(Sweden) (Greece)	Sara Persson; Theodora Ligomenou	21; 4	21; 2
2	(Sweden) (Greece)	Elin Bergblom; Nikoleta Pliaka	21; 2	21; 7
3	(Sweden) (Greece)	Helene Nystedt; Christina Mavromatidou	21; 10	21; 5
4	(Sweden) (Greece)	Emelie Lennartsson / Sophia Hansson; Kiki Aslanidi / Christina Diamantopoulou	21; 9	21; 10
5	(Sweden) (Greece)	Elin Bergblom / Johanna Persson; Chrisa Georgali / Christina Mavromatidou	21; 3	21; 8

==== Italy vs. Greece ====
Italy
4
Alexandreio Melathron, Pavilion Court 1
16 February 2006, 13:00 UTC+3

Greece
1

			1	2	3
1	(Italy) (Greece)	Agnese Allegrini; Theodora Ligomenou	21; 10	21; 5
2	(Italy) (Greece)	Verena Leiter; Christina Mavromatidou	21; 15	21; 15
3	(Italy) (Greece)	Silene Zoia; Chrisa Georgali	14; 21	21; 11	16; 21
4	(Italy) (Greece)	Agnese Allegrini / Verena Leiter; Chrisa Georgali / Christina Mavromatidou	21; 18	25; 27	21; 14
5	(Italy) (Greece)	Erika Biagiotti / Silene Zoia; Kiki Aslanidi / Christina Diamantopoulou	21; 11	21; 12
