= 2006 European Women's Team Badminton Championships knockout stage =

This article lists the full results for knockout stage of 2006 European Women's Team Badminton Championships.

== Bracket ==
Quarter-finals
17 February 2006
England
Bye
Denmark	3
France	1
Netherlands	3
Scotland	0
Sweden	0
Germany	3

Semi-finals
18 February 2006
England	3
Denmark	0
Netherlands	3
Germany	2

Final
19 February 2006
England	0
Netherlands	3
Third place
19 February 2006
Denmark	1
Germany	3

== Quarter-finals ==
=== Denmark vs. France ===
Denmark
3
Alexandreio Melathron, Main Court 1
17 February 2006, 12:00 UTC+3

France
1

			1	2	3
1	(Denmark) (France)	Tine Høy; Pi Hongyan	8; 21	13; 21
2	(Denmark) (France)	Camilla Sørensen; Perrine Le Buhanic	21; 13	21; 18
3	(Denmark) (France)	Anne Marie Pedersen; Weny Rahmawati	13; 21	21; 17	21; 11
4	(Denmark) (France)	Kamilla Rytter Juhl / Lena Frier Kristiansen; Laura Choinet / Pi Hongyan	21; 10	21; 12
5	(Denmark) (France)	Britta Andersen / Mette Schjoldager; Élodie Eymard / Weny Rahmawati				not played

=== Netherlands vs. Scotland ===
Netherlands
3
Alexandreio Melathron, Main Court 2
17 February 2006, 12:00 UTC+3

Scotland
0

			1	2	3
1	(Netherlands) (Scotland)	Yao Jie; Susan Hughes	21; 5	21; 10
2	(Netherlands) (Scotland)	Mia Audina; Yuan Wemyss	21; 11	21; 17
3	(Netherlands) (Scotland)	Judith Meulendijks; Linda Sloan	21; 9	21; 9
4	(Netherlands) (Scotland)	Mia Audina / Lotte Jonathans; Imogen Bankier / Emma Mason				not played
5	(Netherlands) (Scotland)	Brenda Beenhakker / Judith Meulendijks; Michelle Douglas / Yuan Wemyss				not played

=== Sweden vs. Germany ===
Sweden
0
Alexandreio Melathron, Main Court 3
17 February 2006, 12:00 UTC+3

Germany
3

			1	2	3
1	(Sweden) (Germany)	Sara Persson; Huaiwen Xu	15; 21	16; 21
2	(Sweden) (Germany)	Elin Bergblom; Juliane Schenk	13; 21	21; 17	11; 21
3	(Sweden) (Germany)	Helene Nystedt; Petra Overzier	14; 21	8; 21
4	(Sweden) (Germany)	Emelie Lennartsson / Sara Persson; Carina Mette / Michaela Peiffer				not played
5	(Sweden) (Germany)	Elin Bergblom / Johanna Persson; Nicole Grether / Juliane Schenk				not played

== Semi-finals ==
=== England vs. Denmark ===
England
3
Alexandreio Melathron, Main Court 2
18 February 2006, 12:00 UTC+3

Denmark
0

			1	2	3
1	(England) (Denmark)	Tracey Hallam; Tine Høy	21; 19	21; 10
2	(England) (Denmark)	Gail Emms / Donna Kellogg; Britta Andersen / Mette Schjoldager	15; 21	21; 16	21; 12
3	(England) (Denmark)	Elizabeth Cann; Nicholas Kidd	14; 21	21; 19	21; 9
4	(England) (Denmark)	Joanne Nicholas / Ella Tripp; Kamilla Rytter Juhl / Lena Frier Kristiansen				not played
5	(England) (Denmark)	Julia Mann; Anne Marie Pedersen				not played

=== Netherlands vs. Germany ===
Netherlands
3
Alexandreio Melathron, Main Court 1
18 February 2006, 12:00 UTC+3

Germany
2

			1	2	3
1	(Netherlands) (Germany)	Yao Jie; Huaiwen Xu	10; 21	12; 21
2	(Netherlands) (Germany)	Mia Audina; Juliane Schenk	21; 19	24; 22
3	(Netherlands) (Germany)	Judith Meulendijks; Petra Overzier	14; 21	18; 21
4	(Netherlands) (Germany)	Mia Audina / Lotte Jonathans; Nicole Grether / Juliane Schenk	21; 19	21; 14
5	(Netherlands) (Germany)	Brenda Beenhakker / Judith Meulendijks; Kathrin Piotrowski / Huaiwen Xu	21; 12	17; 21	23; 21

== Third place play-off ==
=== Denmark vs. Germany ===
Denmark
1
Alexandreio Melathron, Main Court 2
19 February 2006, 12:00 UTC+3

Germany
3

			1	2	3
1	(Denmark) (Germany)	Camilla Sørensen; Huaiwen Xu	12; 21	10; 21
2	(Denmark) (Germany)	Nanna Brosolat Jensen; Juliane Schenk	15; 21	20; 22
3	(Denmark) (Germany)	Kamilla Rytter Juhl / Lena Frier Kristiansen; Kathrin Piotrowski / Huaiwen Xu	21; 19	21; 14
4	(Denmark) (Germany)	Anne Marie Pedersen; Petra Overzier	16; 21	7; 21
5	(Denmark) (Germany)	Britta Andersen / Mette Schjoldager; Nicole Grether / Juliane Schenk

== Final ==
=== England vs. Netherlands ===
England
0
Alexandreio Melathron, Main Court 1
19 February 2006, 12:00 UTC+3

Netherlands
3

			1	2	3
1	(England) (Netherlands)	Tracey Hallam; Yao Jie	19; 21	16; 21
2	(England) (Netherlands)	Elizabeth Cann; Mia Audina	15; 21	15; 21
3	(England) (Netherlands)	Jill Pittard; Judith Meulendijks	15; 21	14; 21
4	(England) (Netherlands)	Gail Emms / Donna Kellogg; Mia Audina / Lotte Bruil				not played
5	(England) (Netherlands)	Ella Tripp / Joanne Nicholas; Brenda Beenhakker / Judith Meulendijks				not played
