= Rune Massing =

Dutch badminton player

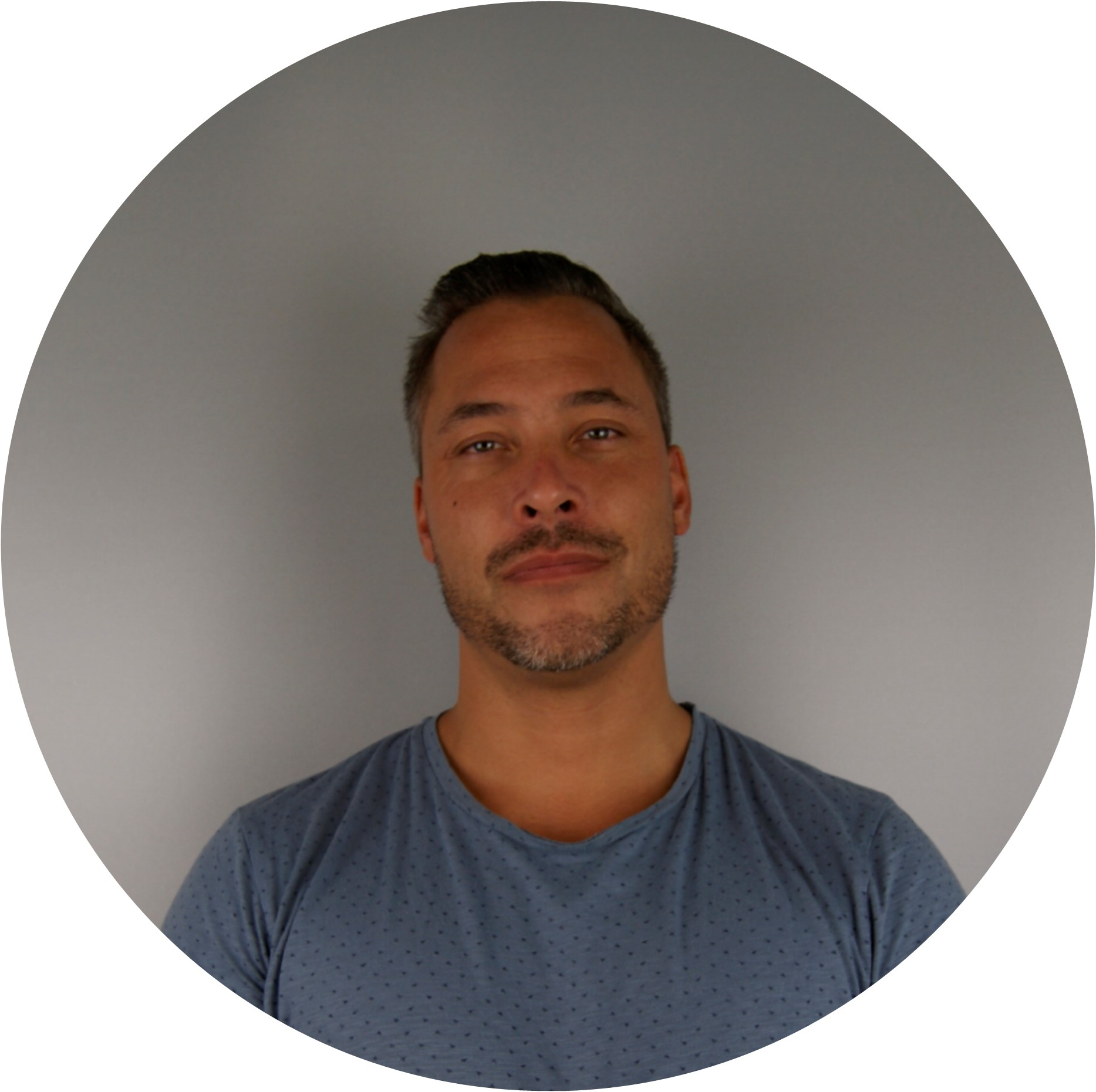

Rune Massing (born 18 August 1980, Leeuwarden) is a Dutch professional badminton player. 2002 and 2003 he won the German team championships with SC Bayer 05 Uerdingen. In 2003 he was the satellite circuit winner.

On 13 June 2011 he announced his retirement.

== Career highlights ==
Year	Tournament	Event	Pos.	Athlete
1997	Dutch National Junior Championships	Men's singles	1	Rune Massing
1997	Dutch National Junior Championships	Men's singles	1	Robert Frenk / Rune Massing
1998	Dutch National Junior Championships	Men's singles	1	Rune Massing
1999	Dutch National Junior Championships	Men's singles	1	Rune Massing
1999/2000	German Team Championships	Team	2	SC Bayer 05 Uerdingen (Kenneth Jonassen, Simon Archer, Chris Bruil, Nicole Grether, Erica van den Heuvel, Rune Massing)
2000/2001	German Team Championships	Team	3	SC Bayer 05 Uerdingen (Simon Archer, Judith Meulendijks, Rune Massing, Nicole Grether, Chris Bruil, Rikke Olsen, Colin Haughton, Silke Gabriel, Kenneth Jonassen, Christine Skropke, Stephan Kuhl, Kristof Hopp, André Bertko, Jürgen Arnold)
2001/2002	German Team Championships	Team	1	SC Bayer 05 Uerdingen (Kenneth Jonassen, Kristof Hopp, Chris Bruil, Rune Massing, Rikke Olsen, Nicole Grether, Colin Haughton, Judith Meulendijks, Erica van den Heuvel, Christine Skrpoke, Silke Gabriel, Simon Archer, Jürgen Arnold, André Bertko, Stephan Kuhl)
2002/2003	German Team Championships	Team	1	SC Bayer 05 Uerdingen (Simon Archer, Rune Massing, Chris Bruil, Colin Haughton, Kenneth Jonassen, Stephan Kuhl, Kristof Hopp, André Bertko, Jürgen Arnold, Judith Meulendijks, Nicole Grether, Rikke Olsen, Silke Gabriel, Christine Skropke)
2005	Belgian International	Men's singles	5	Rune Massing
2005	Babolat Slovak International	Men's singles	3	Rune Massing
2006	Dutch National Championships	Men's singles	2	Rune Massing
2006	Hatzor Israel International	Men's singles	2	Rune Massing
