= Aamir Ghaffar =

Pakistani badminton player

Personal information
- Born: 18 August 1979 (age 46)
- Height: 6 ft 1 in (185 cm)
- Weight: 85 kg (187 lb)

Sport
- Country: England
- Sport: Badminton
- Handedness: Right
- Coached by: Steve Butler and Lee Jae Bok

Men's singles
- Highest ranking: 21st (August 2005)
- BWF profile
Medal record
Badminton
Representing England
European Men's Team Championships
Silver medal – second place	2008 Almere	Men's team
Bronze medal – third place	2006 Thessaloniki	Men's team
Commonwealth Games
Silver medal – second place	2006 Melbourne	Mixed team

Aamir Ghaffar (born 18 August 1979) is a retired badminton player who competed professionally for England.

He is most famous for winning the Canadian Open in 2004 and the men's singles title at the English National Badminton Championship in 2004 and 2005 and reached the final in 2008.

His notable achievements are his victories over 2004 Olympic silver medalist Shon Seung Mo of Korea at the World Championships 2005 in California, World No. 5 Bao Chunlai at the All England Open 2004 and World No. 8 Dicky Palyama at All England Open 2005. He won a silver medal at the Melbourne 2006 Commonwealth games in the team events.

Aamir reached world no. 21 at his peak and currently trains students at Isleworth and Syon School. In 2008, Ghaffar released his own footwork video called "Aamir Ghaffar, Its all about the recovery" in which he demonstrates how to improve the Badminton footwork and how the top players make it look so easy on the court. He is currently training boys at the Dome Silver Performance centre, Hounslow. He is currently in a comeback, having won the Oxford Senior Silver Singles Event.
