= Roman Spitko =

German badminton player (born 1978)

Personal information
- Born: 18 November 1978 (age 47) Bobingen, Bavaria, Germany

Sport
- Country: Germany
- Sport: Badminton
- Handedness: Right

Men's doubles
- Highest ranking: 62 (21 January 2010)
- BWF profile
Medal record
Men's badminton
Representing Germany
European Men's Team Championships
Silver medal – second place	2006 Thessalonica	Men's team
Bronze medal – third place	2008 Almere	Men's team

Roman Spitko (born 18 November 1978) is a German badminton player.

== Career ==
Spitko played the 2006 IBF World Championships in men's singles, defeating Carlos Longo of Spain in the first round. In the round of 32, he was defeated by Dicky Palyama of the Netherlands. He also played in men's doubles with Michael Fuchs, and they were defeated in the round of 16 by Luluk Hadiyanto and Alvent Yulianto of Indonesia.

== Achievements ==
=== IBF Grand Prix ===
The World Badminton Grand Prix was sanctioned by the International Badminton Federation from 1983 to 2006.

Men's doubles

Year	Tournament	Partner	Opponent	Score	Result
2005	Thessaloniki Grand Prix	(Germany) Michael Fuchs	(England) Robert Blair (England) Anthony Clark	6–15, 9–15	(silver) Runner-up

=== BWF International Challenge/Series/European Circuit ===
Men's singles

Year	Tournament	Opponent	Score	Result
2001	Canberra International	(England) Colin Haughton	1–7, 0–7, 3–7	(silver) Runner-up

Men's doubles

Year	Tournament	Partner	Opponent	Score	Result
2004	Czech International	(Germany) Michael Fuchs	(Canada) Mike Beres (Canada) William Milroy	12–15, 13–15	(silver) Runner-up
2005	Dutch International	(Germany) Michael Fuchs	(Germany) Kristof Hopp (Germany) Ingo Kindervater	8–15, 6–15	(silver) Runner-up
2005	Belgian International	(Germany) Michael Fuchs	(Germany) Kristof Hopp (Germany) Ingo Kindervater	6–15, 10–15	(silver) Runner-up
2005	Irish International	(Germany) Michael Fuchs	(France) Mihail Popov (France) Svetoslav Stoyanov	15–9, 5–15, 9–15	(silver) Runner-up
2006	Swedish International	(Germany) Michael Fuchs	(Denmark) Anders Kristiansen (Denmark) Simon Mollyhus	21–16, 15–21, 21–16	(gold) Winner
2006	Dutch International	(Germany) Michael Fuchs	(Germany) Kristof Hopp (Germany) Ingo Kindervater	10–21, 11–21	(silver) Runner-up
2007	Belgian International	(Germany) Michael Fuchs	(Germany) Kristof Hopp (Germany) Ingo Kindervater	27–25, 15–21, 7–21 retired	(silver) Runner-up
2007	Irish International	(Germany) Michael Fuchs	(United States) Khan Malaythong (United States) Howard Bach	15–21, 17–21	(silver) Runner-up
2008	Belgian International	(Germany) Peter Käsbauer	(Scotland) Andrew Bowman (Wales) Martyn Lewis	14–21, 15–21	(silver) Runner-up

Mixed doubles

Year	Tournament	Partner	Opponent	Score	Result
2005	Irish International	(Germany) Carina Mette	(Scotland) Andrew Bowman (Scotland) Kirsteen McEwan	10–15, 15–7, 15–0	(gold) Winner

BWF International Challenge tournament
BWF International Series / European Circuit tournament
