= Ingo Kindervater =

German badminton player (born 1979)

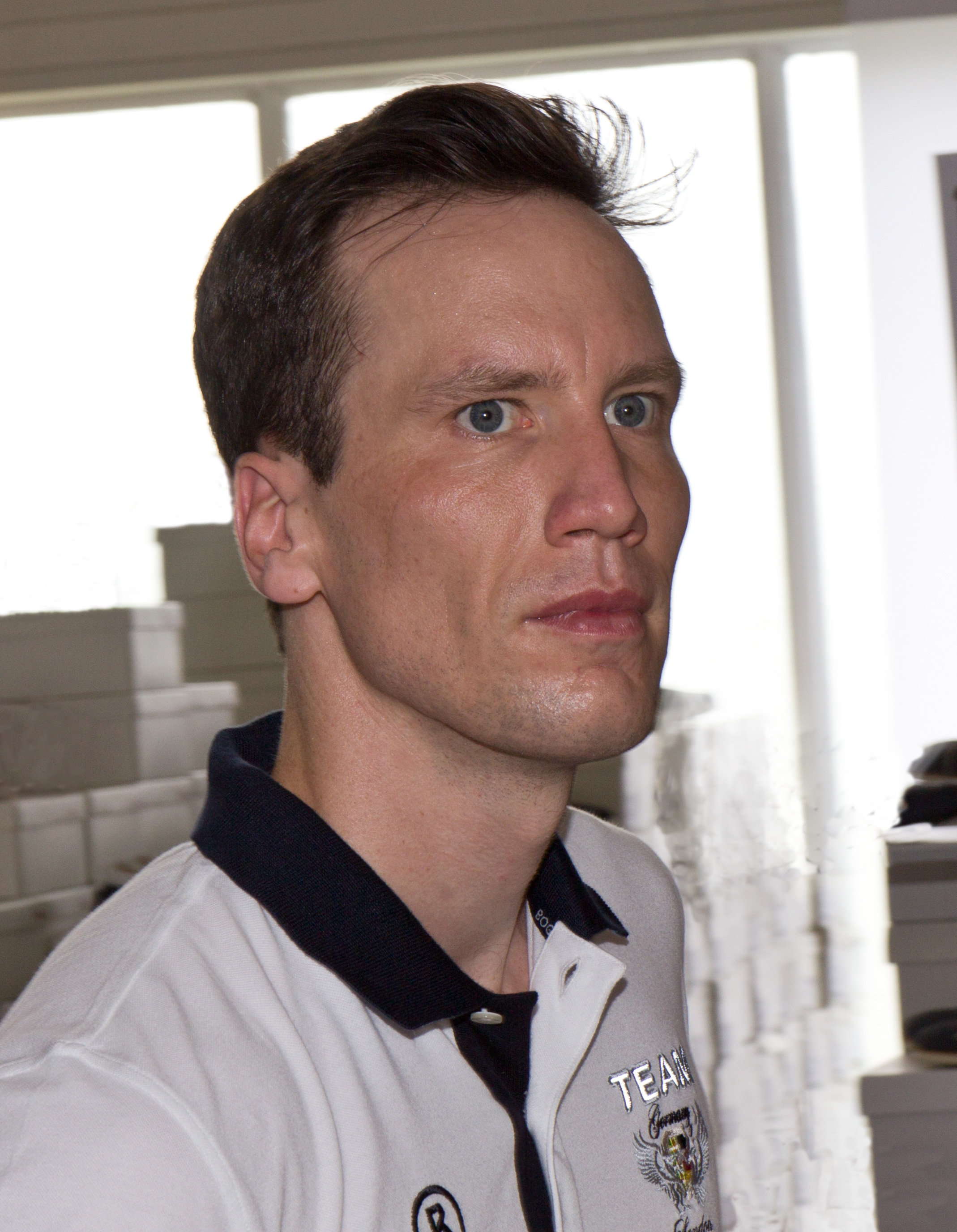

Personal information
- Born: 1 January 1979 (age 47) Burgwedel, West Germany
- Height: 1.93 m (6 ft 4 in)
- Weight: 90 kg (198 lb)

Sport
- Country: Germany
- Sport: Badminton
- Handedness: Right

Men's and mixed doubles
- Highest ranking: 11 (MD) 28 April 2011; 49 (XD) 10 June 2010
- BWF profile
Medal record
Men's badminton
Representing Germany
European Championships
Bronze medal – third place	2010 Manchester	Men's doubles
Bronze medal – third place	2008 Herning	Men's doubles
European Mixed Team Championships
Gold medal – first place	2013 Moscow	Mixed team
Silver medal – second place	2011 Amsterdam	Mixed team
Bronze medal – third place	2004 Geneva	Mixed team
European Men's Team Championships
Silver medal – second place	2012 Amsterdam	Men's team
Silver medal – second place	2006 Thessalonica	Men's team
Bronze medal – third place	2014 Basel	Men's team
Bronze medal – third place	2010 Warsaw	Men's team
Bronze medal – third place	2008 Almere	Men's team

Ingo Kindervater (born 1 January 1979) is a retired badminton player from Germany and now the Head of Performance for Badminton Scotland.

== Career ==
Ingo was the men's doubles bronze medallist at the 2008 European Championships partnered with Kristof Hopp, and in 2010 with Michael Fuchs.

In 2012, he qualified for the London Olympics with Johannes Schöttler after gaining 43529.339 points during the qualifying period and reaching 18th in the BWF World Ranking. On 23 July the draw was conducted and Kindervater and Schöttler were placed in Group A alongside Cai Yun/Fu Haifeng, Fang Chieh Min/Lee Sheng Mu, and Ross Smith/Glenn Warfe.

He won the 2012 Bitburger Open in the men's doubles with his partner Johannes Schöttler after beating Chris Langridge and Peter Mills 21–15, 21–11.

After retiring in 2013, Kindervater finished his diploma in Economics before becoming National Doubles Coach for the German Badminton Association. Kindervater supported the German Badminton Olympic Team as a coach in the Rio 2016 Olympics.

After 6 years in this position, Ingo relocated to Edinburgh, Scotland, where he took the post of Head of Performance with Badminton Scotland.

== Achievements ==
=== European Championships ===
Men's doubles
Year	Venue	Partner	Opponent	Score	Result
2010	Manchester Evening News Arena; Manchester, England	(Germany) Michael Fuchs	(Denmark) Lars Paaske (Denmark) Jonas Rasmussen	10–21, 12–21	Bronze
2008	Messecenter; Herning, Denmark	(Germany) Kristof Hopp	(Denmark) Jens Eriksen (Denmark) Martin Lundgaard Hansen	23–21, 16–21, 8–21	Bronze

=== BWF Superseries ===
The BWF Superseries, launched on 14 December 2006 and implemented in 2007, is a series of elite badminton tournaments, sanctioned by Badminton World Federation (BWF). BWF Superseries has two level such as Superseries and Superseries Premier. A season of Superseries features twelve tournaments around the world, which introduced since 2011, with successful players invited to the Superseries Finals held at the year end.

Men's doubles
Year	Tournament	Partner	Opponent	Score	Result
2010	French Open	(Germany) Johannes Schöttler	(Denmark) Mathias Boe (Denmark) Carsten Mogensen	15–21, 9–21	(silver) Runner-up

BWF Super Series Finals tournament
BWF Super Series Premier tournament
BWF Super Series tournament

=== BWF Grand Prix ===
The BWF Grand Prix has two levels: Grand Prix and Grand Prix Gold. It is a series of badminton tournaments, sanctioned by Badminton World Federation (BWF) since 2007. The World Badminton Grand Prix sanctioned by International Badminton Federation (IBF) since 1983.

Men's doubles
Year	Tournament	Partner	Opponent	Score	Result
2012	Bitburger Open	(Germany) Johannes Schöttler	(England) Chris Langridge (England) Peter Mills	21–15, 21–11	(gold) Winner
2011	Dutch Open	(Germany) Johannes Schöttler	(Poland) Adam Cwalina (Poland) Michal Logosz	19–21, 21–19, 14–21	(silver) Runner-up
2010	Bitburger Open	(Germany) Johannes Schöttler	(Denmark) Mathias Boe (Denmark) Carsten Mogensen	16–21, 16–21	(silver) Runner-up
2009	Dutch Open	(Germany) Michael Fuchs	(Germany) Kristof Hopp (Germany) Johannes Schöttler	15–21, 16–21	(silver) Runner-up
2007	Russian Open	(Germany) Kristof Hopp	(Japan) Shintaro Ikeda (Japan) Shuichi Sakamoto	21–16, 22–20	(gold) Winner

Mixed doubles
Year	Tournament	Partner	Opponent	Score	Result
2005	Dutch Open	(Germany) Kathrin Piotrowski	(Poland) Robert Mateusiak (Poland) Nadieżda Kostiuczyk	5–15, 5–15	(silver) Runner-up

BWF Grand Prix Gold tournament
BWF Grand Prix tournament

=== BWF International Challenge/Series ===
Men's doubles
Year	Tournament	Partner	Opponent	Score	Result
2011	Morocco International	(Germany) Johannes Schöttler	(Germany) Michael Fuchs (Germany) Oliver Roth	21–15, 21–19	(gold) Winner
2010	Norwegian International	(Germany) Johannes Schöttler	(England) Marcus Ellis (England) Peter Mills	21–17, 23–21	(gold) Winner
2010	Belgian International	(Germany) Johannes Schöttler	(Germany) Michael Fuchs (Germany) Oliver Roth	Walkover	(gold) Winner
2008	Norwegian International	(Germany) Michael Fuchs	(Netherlands) Ruud Bosch (Netherlands) Koen Ridder	21–18, 19–21, 21–8	(gold) Winner
2008	European Circuit Finals	(Germany) Kristof Hopp	(Belgium) Wouter Claes (Belgium) Frederic Mawet	16–21, 21–14, 21–16	(gold) Winner
2008	Dutch International	(Germany) Kristof Hopp	(Denmark) Rasmus Bonde (Denmark) Kasper Faust Henriksen	13–21, 21–16, 21–18	(gold) Winner
2007	Belgian International	(Germany) Kristof Hopp	(Germany) Michael Fuchs (Germany) Roman Spitko	25–27, 21–15, 21–7 Retired	(gold) Winner
2007	Turkey International	(Germany) Kristof Hopp	(Germany) Johannes Schöttler (Germany) Tim Dettmann	12–21, 21–18, 22–20	(gold) Winner
2007	Le Volant d'Or de Toulouse	(Germany) Kristof Hopp	(Denmark) Mathias Boe (Denmark) Carsten Mogensen	24–22, 12–21, 9–21	(silver) Runner-up
2006	Dutch International	(Germany) Kristof Hopp	(Germany) Michael Fuchs (Germany) Roman Spitko	21–10, 21–11	(gold) Winner
2006	Austrian International	(Germany) Tim Dettmann	(Austria) Jürgen Koch (Austria) Peter Zauner	18–21, 13–21	(silver) Runner-up
2005	Norwegian International	(Germany) Kristof Hopp	(Sweden) Vidre Wibowo (Indonesia) Imam Sodikin	12–15, 7–15	(silver) Runner-up
2005	Belgian International	(Germany) Kristof Hopp	(Germany) Michael Fuchs (Germany) Roman Spitko	15–6, 15–10	(gold) Winner
2005	Dutch International	(Germany) Kristof Hopp	(Germany) Michael Fuchs (Germany) Roman Spitko	15–8, 15–6	(gold) Winner
2004	Le Volant d'Or de Toulouse	(Germany) Kristof Hopp	(India) Rupesh Kumar (India) Sanave Thomas	7–15, 13–15	(silver) Runner-up
2004	Norwegian International	(Germany) Kristof Hopp	(England) David Lindley (England) Kristian Roebuck	15–14, 15–13	(gold) Winner
2003	Carebaco International	(Germany) Björn Siegemund	(Japan) Keishi Kawaguchi (Japan) Tōru Matsumoto	10–15, 15–10, 17–15	(gold) Winner
2003	Mauritius International	(Germany) Björn Siegemund	(Japan) Shuichi Nakao (Japan) Shuichi Sakamoto	9–15, 15–17	(silver) Runner-up
2001	Iceland International	(Germany) Jochen Cassel	(Iceland) Helgi Jóhannesson (Iceland) Njörður Ludvigsson	0–7, 8–6, 7–4, 7–1	(gold) Winner

Mixed doubles
Year	Tournament	Partner	Opponent	Score	Result
2007	Belgian International	(Germany) Kathrin Piotrowski	(England) Chris Langridge (England) Joanne Nicholas	17–21, 21–15, 23–25	(silver) Runner-up
2007	Turkey International	(Germany) Kathrin Piotrowski	(Germany) Kristof Hopp (Germany) Birgit Overzier	21–18, 21–15	(gold) Winner
2007	Le Volant d'Or de Toulouse	(Germany) Kathrin Piotrowski	(Germany) Kristof Hopp (Germany) Birgit Overzier	21–12, 16–21, 21–14	(gold) Winner
2007	Spanish International	(Germany) Kathrin Piotrowski	(Denmark) Joachim Fischer Nielsen (Denmark) Britta Andersen	24–22, 20–22, 21–23	(silver) Runner-up
2006	Austrian International	(Germany) Kathrin Piotrowski	(Germany) Tim Dettmann (Germany) Sandra Marinello	21–17, 22–20	(gold) Winner
2005	Dutch International	(Germany) Kathrin Piotrowski	(Sweden) Fredrik Bergström (Sweden) Johanna Persson	4–15, 13–15	(silver) Runner-up

BWF International Challenge tournament
BWF International Series tournament
