= Nicholas Kidd =

Australian badminton player

Personal information
- Born: 21 April 1981 (age 45) Papua New Guinea

Sport
- Country: England; Australia
- Sport: Badminton

Men's singles
- Highest ranking: 27 (22 Jul 2010)
- BWF profile
Medal record
Men's badminton
Representing England
Sudirman Cup
Bronze medal – third place	2007 Glasgow	Mixed team
European Men's Team Championships
Bronze medal – third place	2006 Thessalonica	Men's team

Nicholas Kidd (born 21 April 1981) is a badminton player from Australia who has represented both England and Australia.

== Career ==
Kidd played in the 2007 BWF World Championships in men's singles and was defeated in the second round by Kenneth Jonassen of Denmark.

Kidd was runner-up in the Australian Closed Championships in 2008 and champion in 2009 in men's singles. He coached and captained the Western Australian team to bronze in the teams event, the Ede Clendinnen Shield, in 2008 and 2009.

As Australia's number one ranked men's singles player, Kidd was selected to represent Australia in the 2010 Commonwealth Games.

Kidd was the Executive Officer of the Badminton Association of Western Australia.

He coaches the 1st and 2nd team in the Private Schools' Association, Christ Church Grammar School. Kidd is the coach of the Western Australian State badminton Under 15, 17 and 19 teams. In 2017, he coached the U17 WA State team in Invercargill.
