= Michelle Douglas (badminton) =

Scottish international badminton player

Personal information
- Nationality: British (Scottish)
- Born: 17 December 1989 (age 36)

Sport
- Sport: Badminton
- Club: New Stevenston
Medal record
Representing Scotland
Scottish Nationals
Gold medal – first place	2006	doubles

Michelle Douglas (born 17 December 1985) is a former international badminton player from Scotland who competed at the Commonwealth Games.

== Biography ==
Douglas was from New Stevenston in North Lanarkshire.

Douglas represented the Scottish team at the 2006 Commonwealth Games in Melbourne, Australia, where she competed in the badminton events. Also during 2006, she represented Scotland at the 2006 European Badminton Championships in Den Bosch, Netherlands.

She was the doubles champion with Yuan Wemyss at the 2006 Scottish National Badminton Championships.

Douglas collected 14 international caps from 2004 to 2006.
