= Kristof Hopp =

German badminton player (born 1978)

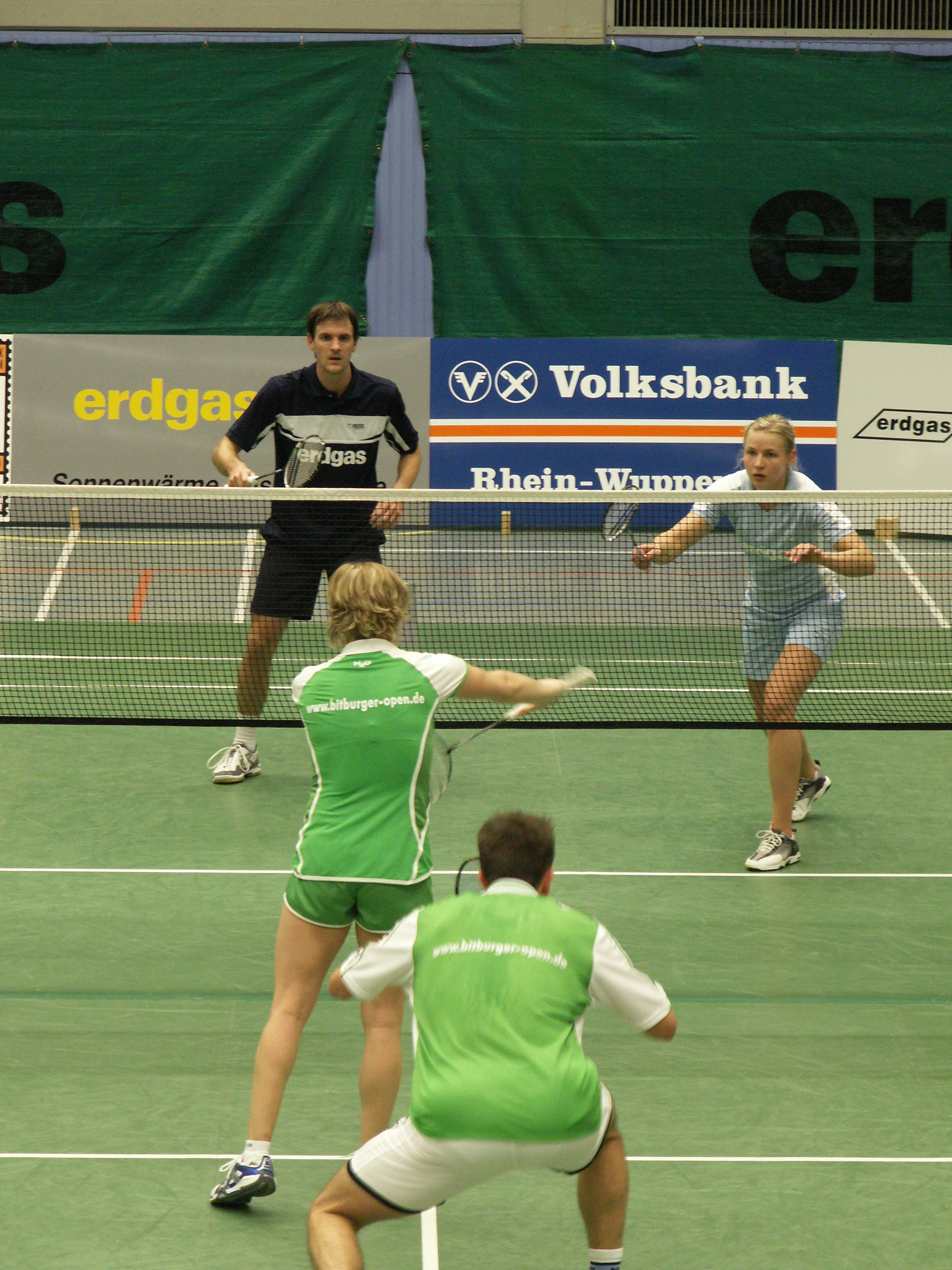

Personal information
- Born: 14 July 1978 (age 48) Kiel, Germany
- Height: 1.83 m (6 ft 0 in)
- Weight: 78 kg (172 lb)

Sport
- Country: Germany
- Sport: Badminton
- Handedness: Right

Men's doubles
- Highest ranking: 27 (10 Dec 2009)
- BWF profile
Medal record
Badminton
Representing Germany
European Championships
Bronze medal – third place	2008 Herning	Men's doubles
European Men's Team Championships
Silver medal – second place	2006 Thessalonica	Men's team
Bronze medal – third place	2010 Warsaw	Men's team
Bronze medal – third place	2008 Almere	Men's team

Kristof Hopp (born 14 July 1978 in Kiel) is a male badminton player from Germany. In 2008, he won the bronze medal at the European Championships in the men's doubles event with Ingo Kindervater. At the same year, he competed at the Summer Olympics in Beijing, China.

== Achievements ==
=== European Championships ===
Men's doubles
Year	Venue	Partner	Opponent	Score	Result
2008	Messecenter, Herning, Denmark	(Germany) Ingo Kindervater	(Denmark) Jens Eriksen (Denmark) Martin Lundgaard Hansen	23–21, 16–21, 8–21	Bronze

=== BWF Grand Prix ===
The BWF Grand Prix has two level such as Grand Prix and Grand Prix Gold. It is a series of badminton tournaments, sanctioned by Badminton World Federation (BWF) since 2007.

Men's doubles
Year	Tournament	Partner	Opponent	Score	Result
2009	Dutch Open	(Germany) Johannes Schöttler	(Germany) Michael Fuchs (Germany) Ingo Kindervater	21–15, 21–16	(gold) Winner
2008	Bitburger Open	(Germany) Johannes Schöttler	(Denmark) Mathias Boe (Denmark) Carsten Mogensen	11–21, 15–21	(silver) Runner-up
2007	Russian Open	(Germany) Ingo Kindervater	(Japan) Shintaro Ikeda (Japan) Shuichi Sakamoto	21–16, 22–20	(gold) Winner

Mixed doubles
Year	Tournament	Partner	Opponent	Score	Result
2008	India Open	(Germany) Birgit Overzier	(China) He Hanbin (China) Yu Yang	18–21, 9–21	(silver) Runner-up
2007	Bitburger Open	(Germany) Birgit Overzier	(England) Robert Blair (Scotland) Imogen Bankier	21–17, 21–17	(gold) Winner

BWF Grand Prix Gold tournament
BWF Grand Prix tournament

=== BWF International Challenge/Series ===
Men's doubles
Year	Tournament	Partner	Opponent	Score	Result
2009	Norwegian International	(Germany) Johannes Schöttler	(Denmark) Rasmus Bonde (Denmark) Simon Mollyhus	21–18, 17–21, 19–21	(silver) Runner-up
2008	Italian International	(Germany) Johannes Schöttler	(Chinese Taipei) Chen Hung-ling (Chinese Taipei) Lin Yu-lang	22–20, 21–13	(gold) Winner
2008	European Circuit Finals	(Germany) Ingo Kindervater	(Belgium) Wouter Claes (Belgium) Frederic Mawet	16–21, 21–14, 21–16	(gold) Winner
2008	Dutch International	(Germany) Ingo Kindervater	(Denmark) Rasmus Bonde (Denmark) Kasper Faust Henriksen	13–21, 21–16, 21–18	(gold) Winner
2007	Belgian International	(Germany) Ingo Kindervater	(Germany) Michael Fuchs (Germany) Roman Spitko	25–27, 21–15, 21–7 Retired	(gold) Winner
2007	Turkey International	(Germany) Ingo Kindervater	(Germany) Johannes Schöttler (Germany) Tim Dettmann	12–21, 21–18, 22–20	(gold) Winner
2007	Le Volant d'Or de Toulouse	(Germany) Ingo Kindervater	(Denmark) Mathias Boe (Denmark) Carsten Mogensen	24–22, 12–21, 9–21	(silver) Runner-up
2006	Dutch International	(Germany) Ingo Kindervater	(Germany) Michael Fuchs (Germany) Roman Spitko	21–10, 21–11	(gold) Winner
2005	Norwegian International	(Germany) Ingo Kindervater	(Sweden) Vidre Wibowo (Indonesia) Imam Sodikin	12–15, 7–15	(silver) Runner-up
2005	Belgian International	(Germany) Ingo Kindervater	(Germany) Michael Fuchs (Germany) Roman Spitko	15–6, 15–10	(gold) Winner
2005	Dutch International	(Germany) Ingo Kindervater	(Germany) Michael Fuchs (Germany) Roman Spitko	15–8, 15–6	(gold) Winner
2004	Le Volant d'Or de Toulouse	(Germany) Ingo Kindervater	(India) Rupesh Kumar (India) Sanave Thomas	7–15, 13–15	(silver) Runner-up
2004	Norwegian International	(Germany) Ingo Kindervater	(England) David Lindley (England) Kristian Roebuck	15–14, 15–13	(gold) Winner
2003	South Africa International	(Germany) Thomas Tesche	(Germany) Jochen Cassel (Germany) Joachim Tesche	15–8, 15–12	(gold) Winner
2001	Croatian International	(Germany) Thomas Tesche	(Poland) Michał Łogosz (Poland) Robert Mateusiak	15–7, 15–13	(gold) Winner
1999	Le Volant d'Or de Toulouse	(Germany) Thomas Tesche	(Bulgaria) Mihail Popov (Bulgaria) Svetoslav Stoyanov	8–15, 15–11, 10–15	(silver) Runner-up
1999	Bulgarian International	(Germany) Thomas Tesche	(Germany) Christian Mohr (Germany) Joachim Tesche	11–15, 6–15	(silver) Runner-up

Mixed doubles
Year	Tournament	Partner	Opponent	Score	Result
2007	Norwegian International	(Germany) Birgit Overzier	(Russia) Vitalij Durkin (Russia) Valeria Sorokina	21–15, 13–21, 21–15	(gold) Winner
2007	Turkey International	(Germany) Birgit Overzier	(Germany) Ingo Kindervater (Germany) Kathrin Piotrowski	18–21, 15–21	(silver) Runner-up
2007	Le Volant d'Or de Toulouse	(Germany) Birgit Overzier	(Germany) Ingo Kindervater (Germany) Kathrin Piotrowski	12–21, 21–16, 14–21	(silver) Runner-up
2006	Dutch International	(Germany) Birgit Overzier	(Belgium) Wouter Claes (Netherlands) Paulien van Dooremalen	21–18, 21–18	(gold) Winner
2005	Norwegian International	(Germany) Birgit Overzier	(Denmark) Søren Frandsen (Denmark) Line Reimers	15–13, 15–7	(gold) Winner
2005	Belgian International	(Germany) Birgit Overzier	(Germany) Tim Dettmann (Germany) Annekatrin Lillie	15–4, 17–14	(gold) Winner
2004	Portugal International	(Germany) Kathrin Piotrowski	(England) Simon Archer (England) Donna Kellogg	12–15, 12–15	(silver) Runner-up
2004	Swedish International	(Germany) Kathrin Piotrowski	(Russia) Nikolai Zuev (Russia) Marina Yakusheva	5–15, 15–13, 15–11	(gold) Winner
2003	Mauritius International	(Germany) Kathrin Piotrowski	(Japan) Tadashi Ohtsuka (Japan) Shizuka Yamamoto	15–10, 7–15, 7–15	(silver) Runner-up
2000	German BMW International	(Germany) Kathrin Piotrowski	(Germany) Michael Keck (Netherlands) Erica van den Heuvel	7–15, 15–9, 8–15	(silver) Runner-up

BWF International Challenge tournament
BWF International Series tournament
