= 2006 European Men's and Women's Team Badminton Championships =

Tournament details
- Dates: 14-19 February 2006
- Venue: Alexandreio Melathron
- Location: Thessaloniki, Greece

The 2006 European Men's and Women's Team Badminton Championships was held in Alexandreio Melathron in Thessaloniki, Greece, from February 14 to February 19, 2006. This tournament also serves as European qualification for the 2006 Thomas & Uber Cup.

== Medalists ==
Event	Gold	Silver	Bronze
Men's Team	Denmark	Germany	England
Women's Team	Netherlands	England	Germany

== Men's team ==
=== Group stage ===
==== Group 1 ====
Pos	Team	Pld	W	L	MF	MA	MD	GF	GA	GD	PF	PA	PD	Pts	Qualification	Denmark	Ireland	Iceland	Armenia
1	Denmark	3	3	0	15	0	+15	30	0	+30	630	225	+405	3	Knockout stage	—	5–0	5–0	5–0
2	Ireland	3	2	1	10	5	+5	20	12	+8	544	464	+80	2			—	5–0	5–0
3	Iceland	3	1	2	4	11	−7	10	23	−13	459	581	−122	1				—	4–1
4	Armenia	3	0	3	1	14	−13	3	28	−25	269	632	−363	0					—

Source: BWF

==== Group 2 ====
Pos	Team	Pld	W	L	MF	MA	MD	GF	GA	GD	PF	PA	PD	Pts	Qualification	Germany	Finland	Portugal	Belarus
1	Germany	3	3	0	14	1	+13	29	2	+27	651	411	+240	3	Knockout stage	—	5–0	5–0	5–0
2	Finland	3	2	1	10	5	+5	21	13	+8	651	580	+71	2			—	4–1	5–0
3	Portugal	3	1	2	6	9	−3	14	21	−7	584	670	−86	1				—	5–0
4	Belarus	3	0	3	0	15	−15	2	30	−28	448	673	−225	0					—

Source: BWF

==== Group 3 ====
Pos	Team	Pld	W	L	MF	MA	MD	GF	GA	GD	PF	PA	PD	Pts	Qualification	Austria	Wales	Scotland	Cyprus
1	Austria	3	3	0	12	3	+9	26	5	+21	636	471	+165	3	Knockout stage	—	3–2	4–1	5–0
2	Wales	3	2	1	11	4	+7	20	12	+8	616	517	+99	2			—	4–1	4–1
3	Scotland	3	1	2	6	9	−3	14	16	−2	544	517	+27	1				—	5–0
4	Cyprus	3	0	3	1	14	−13	2	29	−27	353	644	−291	0					—

Source: BWF

==== Group 4 ====
Pos	Team	Pld	W	L	MF	MA	MD	GF	GA	GD	PF	PA	PD	Pts	Qualification	France	Czech Republic	Romania	Turkey
1	France	3	3	0	12	3	+9	24	10	+14	666	537	+129	3	Knockout stage	—	3–2	4–1	5–0
2	Czech Republic	3	2	1	12	3	+9	25	6	+19	624	446	+178	2			—	5–0	5–0
3	Romania	3	1	2	4	11	−7	9	22	−13	500	613	−113	1				—	3–2
4	Turkey	3	0	3	2	13	−11	6	26	−20	461	655	−194	0					—

Source: BWF

==== Group 5 ====
Pos	Team	Pld	W	L	MF	MA	MD	GF	GA	GD	PF	PA	PD	Pts	Qualification	Netherlands	Spain	Norway	Greece
1	Netherlands	3	3	0	12	3	+9	28	6	+22	684	436	+248	3	Knockout stage	—	3–2	5–0	5–0
2	Spain	3	2	1	11	4	+7	23	11	+12	651	558	+93	2			—	4–1	5–0
3	Norway	3	1	2	6	9	−3	15	20	−5	637	594	+43	1				—	5–0
4	Greece (H)	3	0	3	1	14	−13	1	30	−29	265	649	−384	0					—

Source: BWF
(H) Host

==== Group 6 ====
Pos	Team	Pld	W	L	MF	MA	MD	GF	GA	GD	PF	PA	PD	Pts	Qualification	England	Bulgaria	Slovenia	Israel
1	England	3	3	0	15	0	+15	30	0	+30	630	327	+303	3	Knockout stage	—	5–0	5–0	5–0
2	Bulgaria	3	2	1	8	7	+1	18	16	+2	601	590	+11	2			—	3–2	5–0
3	Slovenia	3	1	2	7	8	−1	15	18	−3	562	593	−31	1				—	5–0
4	Israel	3	0	3	0	15	−15	1	30	−29	367	650	−283	0					—

Source: BWF

==== Group 7 ====
Pos	Team	Pld	W	L	MF	MA	MD	GF	GA	GD	PF	PA	PD	Pts	Qualification	Poland	Russia	Belgium	Estonia
1	Poland	3	3	0	14	1	+13	28	5	+23	676	433	+243	3	Knockout stage	—	5–0	5–0	4–1
2	Russia	3	2	1	8	7	+1	16	18	−2	588	633	−45	2			—	3–2	3–2
3	Belgium	3	1	2	6	9	−3	13	19	−6	540	599	−59	1				—	4–1
4	Estonia	3	0	3	2	13	−11	9	24	−15	518	657	−139	0					—

Source: BWF

==== Group 8 ====
Pos	Team	Pld	W	L	MF	MA	MD	GF	GA	GD	PF	PA	PD	Pts	Qualification	Ukraine	Sweden	Italy	Switzerland
1	Ukraine	3	3	0	12	3	+9	24	9	+15	649	525	+124	3	Knockout stage	—	3–2	5–0	4–1
2	Sweden	3	2	1	10	5	+5	23	12	+11	677	557	+120	2			—	4–1	4–1
3	Italy	3	1	2	4	11	−7	8	23	−15	474	606	−132	1				—	3–2
4	Switzerland	3	0	3	4	11	−7	12	23	−11	570	682	−112	0					—

Source: BWF

=== Knockout stage ===
Quarter-finals
17 February 2006
Denmark	3
Ukraine	0
France	0
England	3
Netherlands	3
Austria	0
Poland	2
Germany	3

Semi-finals
18 February 2006
Denmark	3
England	0
Netherlands	1
Germany	3

Final
19 February 2006
Denmark	3
Germany	0
Third place
19 February 2006
England	3
Netherlands	1

=== Final ranking ===
Pos	Team	Pld	W	L	Pts	MD	GD	PD	Final result
1st place, gold medalist(s)	Denmark	6	6	0	6	+24	+45	+554	Champions
2nd place, silver medalist(s)	Germany	6	5	1	5	+13	+26	+272	Runners-up
3rd place, bronze medalist(s)	England	6	5	1	5	+17	+36	+326	Third place
4	Netherlands	6	4	2	4	+8	+21	+228	Fourth place
5	Poland	4	3	1	3	+12	+21	+199	Eliminated in quarter-finals
6	Austria	4	3	1	3	+6	+15	+125	Eliminated in quarter-finals
7	France	4	3	1	3	+6	+9	+98	Eliminated in quarter-finals
8	Ukraine	4	3	1	3	+6	+9	+55	Eliminated in quarter-finals
9	Czech Republic	3	2	1	2	+9	+19	+178	Eliminated in group stage
10	Spain	3	2	1	2	+7	+12	+93	Eliminated in group stage
11	Wales	3	2	1	2	+7	+8	+99	Eliminated in group stage
12	Sweden	3	2	1	2	+5	+11	+120	Eliminated in group stage
13	Ireland	3	2	1	2	+5	+8	+80	Eliminated in group stage
14	Finland	3	2	1	2	+5	+8	+71	Eliminated in group stage
15	Bulgaria	3	2	1	2	+1	+2	+11	Eliminated in group stage
16	Russia	3	2	1	2	+1	−2	−45	Eliminated in group stage
17	Slovenia	3	1	2	1	−1	−3	−31	Eliminated in group stage
18	Scotland	3	1	2	1	−3	−2	+27	Eliminated in group stage
19	Norway	3	1	2	1	−3	−5	+43	Eliminated in group stage
20	Belgium	3	1	2	1	−3	−6	−59	Eliminated in group stage
21	Portugal	3	1	2	1	−3	−7	−86	Eliminated in group stage
22	Romania	3	1	2	1	−7	−13	−113	Eliminated in group stage
23	Iceland	3	1	2	1	−7	−13	−122	Eliminated in group stage
24	Italy	3	1	2	1	−7	−15	−132	Eliminated in group stage
25	Switzerland	3	0	3	0	−7	−11	−112	Eliminated in group stage
26	Estonia	3	0	3	0	−11	−15	−139	Eliminated in group stage
27	Turkey	3	0	3	0	−11	−20	−194	Eliminated in group stage
28	Armenia	3	0	3	0	−13	−25	−363	Eliminated in group stage
29	Cyprus	3	0	3	0	−13	−27	−291	Eliminated in group stage
30	Greece (H)	3	0	3	0	−13	−29	−384	Eliminated in group stage
31	Belarus	3	0	3	0	−15	−28	−225	Eliminated in group stage
32	Israel	3	0	3	0	−15	−29	−283	Eliminated in group stage

== Women's team ==
=== Group stage ===
==== Group 1 ====
Pos	Team	Pld	W	L	MF	MA	MD	GF	GA	GD	PF	PA	PD	Pts	Qualification	England	Bulgaria	Czech Republic	Cyprus
1	England	3	3	0	14	1	+13	27	3	+24	615	340	+275	3	Knockout stage	—	4–1	5–0	5–0
2	Bulgaria	3	2	1	8	7	+1	17	15	+2	544	528	+16	2			—	3–2	4–1
3	Czech Republic	3	1	2	6	9	−3	10	20	−10	467	561	−94	1				—	4–1
4	Cyprus	3	0	3	2	13	−11	4	20	−16	296	493	−197	0					—

Source: BWF

==== Group 2 ====
Pos	Team	Pld	W	L	MF	MA	MD	GF	GA	GD	PF	PA	PD	Pts	Qualification	Germany	Poland	Belarus	Turkey
1	Germany	3	3	0	14	1	+13	29	2	+27	650	339	+311	3	Knockout stage	—	5–0	5–0	5–0
2	Poland	3	2	1	8	7	+1	17	15	+2	538	566	−28	2			—	3–2	5–0
3	Belarus	3	1	2	8	7	+1	17	17	0	600	588	+12	1				—	5–0
4	Turkey	3	0	3	0	15	−15	1	30	−29	354	649	−295	0					—

Source: BWF

==== Group 3 ====
Pos	Team	Pld	W	L	MF	MA	MD	GF	GA	GD	PF	PA	PD	Pts	Qualification	Scotland	Ukraine	Finland	Iceland
1	Scotland	3	3	0	12	3	+9	24	7	+17	623	449	+174	3	Knockout stage	—	4–1	3–2	5–0
2	Ukraine	3	2	1	9	6	+3	21	13	+8	635	576	+59	2			—	3–2	5–0
3	Finland	3	1	2	7	8	−1	15	19	−4	583	604	−21	1				—	3–2
4	Iceland	3	0	3	2	13	−11	6	27	−21	458	670	−212	0					—

Source: BWF

==== Group 4 ====
Pos	Team	Pld	W	L	MF	MA	MD	GF	GA	GD	PF	PA	PD	Pts	Qualification	Denmark	Portugal	Spain	Slovakia
1	Denmark	3	3	0	15	0	+15	30	2	+28	666	382	+284	3	Knockout stage	—	5–0	5–0	5–0
2	Portugal	3	2	1	9	6	+3	20	13	+7	595	553	+42	2			—	5–0	4–1
3	Spain	3	1	2	3	12	−9	9	26	−17	545	669	−124	1				—	3–2
4	Slovakia	3	0	3	3	12	−9	8	26	−18	462	664	−202	0					—

Source: BWF

==== Group 5 ====
Pos	Team	Pld	W	L	MF	MA	MD	GF	GA	GD	PF	PA	PD	Pts	Qualification	Netherlands	Estonia	Ireland	Austria
1	Netherlands	3	3	0	15	0	+15	30	1	+29	651	307	+344	3	Knockout stage	—	5–0	5–0	5–0
2	Estonia	3	2	1	8	7	+1	16	18	−2	548	639	−91	2			—	5–0	3–2
3	Ireland	3	1	2	3	12	−9	10	25	−15	513	686	−173	1				—	3–2
4	Austria	3	0	3	4	11	−7	10	22	−12	526	606	−80	0					—

Source: BWF

==== Group 6 ====
Pos	Team	Pld	W	L	MF	MA	MD	GF	GA	GD	PF	PA	PD	Pts	Qualification	France	Slovenia	Switzerland	Wales
1	France	3	3	0	14	1	+13	29	4	+25	673	411	+262	3	Knockout stage	—	4–1	5–0	5–0
2	Slovenia	3	2	1	9	6	+3	20	13	+7	592	509	+83	2			—	3–2	5–0
3	Switzerland	3	1	2	7	8	−1	15	17	−2	552	511	+41	1				—	5–0
4	Wales	3	0	3	0	15	−15	0	30	−30	244	630	−386	0					—

Source: BWF

==== Group 7 ====
Pos	Team	Pld	W	L	MF	MA	MD	GF	GA	GD	PF	PA	PD	Pts	Qualification	Sweden	Italy	Greece
1	Sweden	2	2	0	10	0	+10	20	0	+20	421	178	+243	2	Knockout stage	—	5–0	5–0
2	Italy	2	1	1	4	6	−2	9	13	−4	362	391	−29	1			—	4–1
3	Greece (H)	2	0	2	1	9	−8	3	19	−16	240	454	−214	0				—

Source: BWF
(H) Host

=== Knockout stage ===
Quarter-finals
17 February 2006
England
Bye
Denmark	3
France	1
Netherlands	3
Scotland	0
Sweden	0
Germany	3

Semi-finals
18 February 2006
England	3
Denmark	0
Netherlands	3
Germany	2

Final
19 February 2006
England	0
Netherlands	3
Third place
19 February 2006
Denmark	1
Germany	3

=== Final ranking ===
Pos	Team	Pld	W	L	Pts	MD	GD	PD	Final result
1st place, gold medalist(s)	Netherlands	6	6	0	6	+22	+42	+431	Champions
2nd place, silver medalist(s)	England	5	4	1	4	+13	+22	+271	Runners-up
3rd place, bronze medalist(s)	Germany	5	5	1	5	+17	+35	+404	Third place
4	Denmark	5	4	2	4	+12	+23	+234	Fourth place
5	France	4	3	1	3	+11	+22	+246	Eliminated in quarter-finals
6	Scotland	4	3	1	3	+6	+11	+109	Eliminated in quarter-finals
7	Sweden	3	2	1	2	+7	+15	+198	Eliminated in quarter-finals
8	Ukraine	3	2	1	2	+3	+8	+59	Eliminated in group stage
9	Slovenia	3	2	1	2	+3	+7	+83	Eliminated in group stage
10	Portugal	3	2	1	2	+3	+7	+42	Eliminated in group stage
11	Bulgaria	3	2	1	2	+1	+2	+16	Eliminated in group stage
12	Poland	3	2	1	2	+1	+2	−28	Eliminated in group stage
13	Estonia	3	2	1	2	+1	−2	−91	Eliminated in group stage
14	Belarus	3	1	2	1	+1	0	+12	Eliminated in group stage
15	Switzerland	3	1	2	1	−1	−2	+41	Eliminated in group stage
16	Finland	3	1	2	1	−1	−4	−21	Eliminated in group stage
17	Italy	2	1	1	1	−2	−4	−29	Eliminated in group stage
18	Czech Republic	3	1	2	1	−3	−10	−94	Eliminated in group stage
19	Ireland	3	1	2	1	−9	−15	−173	Eliminated in group stage
20	Spain	3	1	2	1	−9	−17	−124	Eliminated in group stage
21	Austria	3	0	3	0	−7	−12	−80	Eliminated in group stage
22	Greece (H)	2	0	2	0	−8	−16	−214	Eliminated in group stage
23	Slovakia	3	0	3	0	−9	−18	−202	Eliminated in group stage
24	Cyprus	3	0	3	0	−11	−16	−197	Eliminated in group stage
25	Iceland	3	0	3	0	−11	−21	−212	Eliminated in group stage
26	Turkey	3	0	3	0	−15	−29	−295	Eliminated in group stage
27	Wales	3	0	3	0	−15	−30	−386	Eliminated in group stage
