= 2007 Vietnam Open Grand Prix =

Tournament details
- Dates: November 6, 2007 – November 11, 2007
- Edition: 4th
- Level: Grand Prix
- Total prize money: US$50,000
- Venue: Quần Ngựa Sports Palace
- Location: Hanoi, Vietnam

Champions
- Men's singles: (Malaysia) Roslin Hashim
- Women's singles: (China) Zhu Jingjing
- Men's doubles: (South Korea) Ko Sung-hyun (South Korea) Kwon Yi-goo
- Women's doubles: (Indonesia) Natalia Christine Poluakan (Indonesia) Yulianti
- Mixed doubles: (Indonesia) Tontowi Ahmad (Indonesia) Yulianti

The 2007 Vietnam Open Grand Prix was a badminton tournament which took place in Hanoi, Vietnam from 6 to 11 November 2007. It had a total purse of $50,000.

== Tournament ==
The 2007 Vietnam Open Grand Prix was the tenth tournament of the 2007 BWF Grand Prix Gold and Grand Prix and also part of the Vietnam Open championships which has been held since 1996. This tournament was organized by the Vietnam Badminton Association and sanctioned by the BWF.

=== Venue ===
This international tournament was held at Quần Ngựa Sports Palace in Hanoi, Vietnam.

=== Point distribution ===
Below is the point distribution for each phase of the tournament based on the BWF points system for the BWF Grand Prix event.

Winner	Runner-up	3/4	5/8	9/16	17/32	33/64	65/128	129/256
5,500	4,680	3,850	3,030	2,110	1,290	510	240	100

=== Prize money ===
The total prize money for this tournament was US$50,000. Distribution of prize money was in accordance with BWF regulations.

Event	Winner	Finals	Semi-finals	Quarter-finals	Last 16
Men's singles	$4,000	$2,000	$1,000	$500	$200
Women's singles	$3,450	$1,650	$900	$450	—N/a
Men's doubles	$3,600	$2,000	$1,200	$700	—N/a
Women's doubles	$3,060	$2,000	$1,100	$550	—N/a
Mixed doubles	$3,060	$2,000	$1,100	$550	—N/a

== Men's singles ==
=== Seeds ===
1. (China) Chen Yu (quarter-finals)
2. (Malaysia) Roslin Hashim (champion)
3. (Malaysia) Sairul Amar Ayob (withdrew)
4. (Japan) Yousuke Nakanishi (withdrew)
5. (India) Chetan Anand (first round)
6. (Vietnam) Nguyễn Tiến Minh (quarter-finals)
7. (Malaysia) Tan Chun Seang (second round)
8. (Indonesia) Andre Kurniawan Tedjono (final)
9. (Czech Republic) Jan Vondra (withdrew)
10. (Malaysia) Kuan Beng Hong (semi-finals)
11. (Malaysia) Kenn Lim (third round)
12. (China) Lü Yi (third round)
13. (Indonesia) Ari Yuli Wahyu Hartanto (third round)
14. (Malaysia) Yogendran Khrishnan (third round)
15. (Thailand) Pakkawat Vilailak (second round)
16. (Malaysia) Beryno Wong (first round)

=== Finals ===
Semi-finals
8	(Indonesia) Andre Kurniawan Tedjono	21	21
10	(Malaysia) Kuan Beng Hong	19	12
(Malaysia) Chong Wei Feng	11	14
2	(Malaysia) Roslin Hashim	21	21

Final
8	(Indonesia) Andre Kurniawan Tedjono	12	23
2	(Malaysia) Roslin Hashim	21	25

=== Top half ===
==== Section 1 ====
First round
1	(China) Chen Y	21	21
(Malaysia) Chew K S	9	12
(Malaysia) Chai Y N	21	18	21
(Vietnam) Phạm C H	18	21	9
14	(Malaysia) Y Khrishnan	21	21
PFQ	(Vietnam) Đào M T	12	14
(Indonesia) D H Rumbaka	24	21
(Vietnam) Nguyễn Q P	22	10
8	(Indonesia) A K Tedjono	21	21
(Chinese Taipei) Kuo T-h	17	19
(Ukraine) V Atrashchenkov	16	17
(Indonesia) A Adityawarman	21	21
16	(Malaysia) B Wong	21	11	10
(India) Parupalli K	9	21	21
(Vietnam) Nguyễn H G	21	22
Q3	(Vietnam) Nguyễn T T	12	20

Second round
1	(China) Chen Y	21	21
(Malaysia) Chai Y N	15	8
(Malaysia) Y Khrishnan	22	19	21
(Indonesia) D H Rumbaka	20	21	14
8	(Indonesia) A K Tedjono	21	21
(Indonesia) A Adityawarman	18	15
(India) Parupalli K	21	21
(Vietnam) Nguyễn H G	9	7

Third round
1	(China) Chen Y	21	21
(Malaysia) Y Khrishnan	14	13
8	(Indonesia) A K Tedjono	21	21
(India) Parupalli K	6	16

Quarter-finals
1	(China) Chen Y	21	11	12
8	(Indonesia) A K Tedjono	17	21	21

==== Section 2 ====
First round
PFQ	(Vietnam) Phạm V T	21	21
Q1	(Vietnam) Đường V L	12	16
(Australia) B Walklate	14	13
(Vietnam) Nguyễn Q M	21	21
15	(Thailand) P Wilailak	21	21
(Vietnam) Dương P N	17	14
(South Korea) Hong J-h	21	21
(Philippines) K Asuncion	13	14
7	(Malaysia) Tan C S	21	21
Q2	(Australia) C Whitehead	16	12
(Malaysia) Chong L Q	21	21
(Laos) S Muanevongsa	10	14
10	(Malaysia) Kuan B H	w	/	o
(Bulgaria) B Kessov
(Indonesia) I B Ade Chandra	w	/	o
(Malaysia) Pei W C

Second round
PFQ	(Vietnam) Phạm V T	10	9
(Vietnam) Nguyễn Q M	21	21
15	(Thailand) P Wilailak	15	20
(South Korea) Hong J-h	21	22
7	(Malaysia) Tan C S	21	11	18
(Malaysia) Chong L Q	16	21	21
10	(Malaysia) Kuan B H	11	21	21
(Indonesia) I B Ade Chandra	21	10	18

Third round
(Vietnam) Nguyễn Q M	15	9
(South Korea) Hong J-h	21	21
(Malaysia) Chong L Q	17	15
10	(Malaysia) Kuan B H	21	21

Quarter-finals
(South Korea) Hong J-h	19	19
10	(Malaysia) Kuan B H	21	21

=== Bottom half ===
==== Section 3 ====
First round
(Malaysia) Chan K B	21	13	18
(Vietnam) Nguyễn H H	14	21	21
Q7	(Chinese Taipei) Lin Y-j	21	21
PFQ	(Vietnam) Trần Đ P	7	18
Q4	(South Korea) Rho Y-w	21	21
(Indonesia) B S Pamungkas	17	12
(Malaysia) Chong W F	13	21	21
5	(India) C Anand	21	12	10
Q6	(Vietnam) Nguyễn M T	21	21
(Vietnam) Bùi B Đ	12	8
(Vietnam) Nguyễn H G	5	22	21
11	(Malaysia) K Lim	21	20	23
(China) Qui YB	21	21
(Vietnam) Bùi Q T	14	11
(Vietnam) Nguyễn N T	21	21
PFQ	(Vietnam) Lê V	7	15

Second round
(Vietnam) Nguyễn H H	22	21
Q7	(Chinese Taipei) Lin Y-j	20	16
Q4	(South Korea) Rho Y-w	13	21	15
(Malaysia) Chong W F	21	16	21
Q6	(Vietnam) Nguyễn M T	9	10
11	(Malaysia) K Lim	21	21
(China) Qui YB	21	21
(Vietnam) Nguyễn N T	8	9

Third round
(Vietnam) Nguyễn H H	18	8
(Malaysia) Chong W F	21	21
11	(Malaysia) K Lim	8	9
(China) Qui YB	21	21

Quarter-finals
(Malaysia) Chong W F	17	21	21
(China) Qui YB	21	10	15

==== Section 4 ====
First round
PFQ	(Vietnam) Lê H A	23	21
Q8	(Vietnam) Trần H Q	21	13
(Chinese Taipei) Liao S-s	13	13
12	(China) Lü Y	21	21
(South Korea) Son W-h	21	21
(Vietnam) Nguyễn H N	8	14
(Malaysia) Lok C C	13	14
6	(Vietnam) Nguyễn T M	21	21
Q5	(Vietnam) Nghiệm Đ C	21	24
(Vietnam) Nguyễn N M	11	22
(Vietnam) Phạm N T	13	4
13	(Indonesia) A Y W Hartanto	21	21
(Chinese Taipei) Chou T-c	15	22
(Malaysia) Liew D	21	24
(Vietnam) Văn T K	10	5
2	(Malaysia) R Hashim	21	21

Second round
PFQ	(Vietnam) Lê H A	9	8
12	(China) Lü Y	21	21
(South Korea) Son W-h	8	11
6	(Vietnam) Nguyễn T M	21	21
Q5	(Vietnam) Nghiệm Đ C	7	10
13	(Indonesia) A Y W Hartanto	21	21
(Malaysia) Liew D	13	16
2	(Malaysia) R Hashim	21	21

Third round
12	(China) Lü Y	20	14
6	(Vietnam) Nguyễn T M	22	21
13	(Indonesia) A Y W Hartanto	12	13
2	(Malaysia) R Hashim	21	21

Quarter-finals
6	(Vietnam) Nguyễn T M	12	13
2	(Malaysia) R Hashim	21	21

== Women's singles ==
=== Seeds ===
1. (Malaysia) Julia Wong Pei Xian (quarter-finals)
2. (India) Saina Nehwal (second round)
3. (China) Wang Lin (semi-finals)
4. (Japan) Yu Hirayama (final)
5. (Japan) Kanako Yonekura (second round)
6. (Thailand) Soratja Chansrisukot (second round)
7. (China) Wang Yihan (semi-finals)
8. (Thailand) Molthila Meemeak (quarter-finals)

=== Finals ===
Semi-finals
7	(China) Wang Yihan	21	17
4	(Japan) Yu Hirayama	23	21
3	(China) Wang Lin	22	12
(China) Zhu Jingjing	24	21

Final
4	(Japan) Yu Hirayama	10	10
(China) Zhu Jingjing	21	21

=== Top half ===
==== Section 1 ====
First round
1	(Malaysia) J Wong P X	21	21
(India) T Murgunde	17	12
(New Zealand) R Hindley	21	19	21
Q1	(Vietnam) Thái T H G	19	21	15
7	(China) Wang YH	21	18	21
(South Korea) Jang S-y	9	21	9
(Indonesia) Y K Putri	21	21
Q4	(Vietnam) Nguyễn T B T	15	14

Second round
1	(Malaysia) J Wong P X	21	21
(New Zealand) R Hindley	7	19
7	(China) Wang YH	21	21
(Indonesia) Y K Putri	11	16

Quarter-finals
1	(Malaysia) J Wong P X	4	21	20
7	(China) Wang YH	21	14	22

==== Section 2 ====
First round
4	(Japan) Y Hirayama	21	21
PFQ	(Vietnam) Phạm T T	7	13
(Chinese Taipei) Chang L-ying	23	21
(Vietnam) Lê T T T	21	13
6	(Thailand) S Chansrisukot	21	21
Q2	(Malaysia) N Baharum	12	14
(Indonesia) S Kurniawan	21	21
(Australia) E Carroll	13	9

Second round
4	(Japan) Y Hirayama	21	21
(Chinese Taipei) Chang L-ying	15	12
6	(Thailand) S Chansrisukot	21	12	13
(Indonesia) S Kurniawan	17	21	21

Quarter-finals
4	(Japan) Y Hirayama	22	21
(Indonesia) S Kurniawan	20	11

=== Bottom half ===
==== Section 3 ====
First round
(Samoa) H Mafaufau	1	8
(Japan) M Fujii	21	21
(Australia) Cheah F M	7	9
8	(Thailand) M Meemeak	21	21
(Indonesia) M E Christina	21	21
(Ukraine) E Prus	19	9
(Malaysia) A R Kaur	14	19
3	(China) Wang L	21	21

Second round
(Japan) M Fujii	21	16	17
8	(Thailand) M Meemeak	18	21	21
(Indonesia) M E Christina	9	10
3	(China) Wang L	21	21

Quarter-finals
8	(Thailand) M Meemeak	15	14
3	(China) Wang L	21	21

==== Section 4 ====
First round
(South Korea) Kim M-h	15	19
(Indonesia) F Ratnasari	21	21
(Indonesia) A Yuswandari	21	19	18
5	(Japan) K Yonekura	17	21	21
(China) Zhu JJ	21	21
(Malaysia) S Mudukasan	12	16
(United States) J Coleman	4	2
2	(India) S Nehwal	21	21

Second round
(Indonesia) F Ratnasari	21	17	21
5	(Japan) K Yonekura	18	21	14
(China) Zhu JJ	16	21	21
2	(India) S Nehwal	21	14	16

Quarter-finals
(Indonesia) F Ratnasari	7	21	16
(China) Zhu JJ	21	17	21

== Men's doubles ==
=== Seeds ===
1. (Malaysia) Chan Chong Ming / Hoon Thien How (withdrew)
2. (Chinese Taipei) Chien Yu-hsun / Lin Yu-lang (semi-finals)
3. (Hong Kong) Hui Wai Ho / Alroy Tanama Putra (first round)
4. (Malaysia) Chew Choon Eng / Hong Cieng Hun (quarter-finals)
5. (Malaysia) Gan Teik Chai / Robert Lin Woon Fui (quarter-finals)
6. (Indonesia) Yonathan Suryatama Dasuki / Rian Sukmawan (second round)
7. (South Korea) Cho Gun-woo / Kang Myeong-won (final)
8. (Indonesia) Mohammad Ahsan / Bona Septano (quarter-finals)

=== Finals ===
Semi-finals
(Chinese Taipei) Chen Hung-ling (Chinese Taipei) Lin Yen-jui	17	13
7	(South Korea) Cho Gun-woo (South Korea) Kang Myeong-won	21	21
(South Korea) Ko Sung-hyun (South Korea) Kwon Yi-goo	21	21
2	(Chinese Taipei) Chien Yu-hsun (Chinese Taipei) Lin Yu-lang	18	6

Final
7	(South Korea) Cho Gun-woo (South Korea) Kang Myeong-won	17	12
(South Korea) Ko Sung-hyun (South Korea) Kwon Yi-goo	21	21

=== Top half ===
==== Section 1 ====
First round
PFQ	(Vietnam) Nguyễn H G (Vietnam) Trần H Q	22	16	21
(Vietnam) Nguyễn N T (Vietnam) Nguyễn N M	20	21	18
(Vietnam) Bùi Q T (Vietnam) Trần Đ P	12	11
(Chinese Taipei) Chen H-l (Chinese Taipei) Lin Ye-j	21	21
8	(Indonesia) M Ahsan (Indonesia) B Septano	21	21
(Vietnam) Nguyễn Q P (Vietnam) Trần T H	18	15
(Indonesia) T Ahmad (Indonesia) I V Okvana	20	18
(Malaysia) M R Abdul Latif (Malaysia) Khoo C C	22	21

Second round
PFQ	(Vietnam) Nguyễn H G (Vietnam) Trần H Q	13	5
(Chinese Taipei) Chen H-l (Chinese Taipei) Lin Ye-j	21	21
8	(Indonesia) M Ahsan (Indonesia) B Septano	21	24
(Malaysia) M R Abdul Latif (Malaysia) Khoo C C	19	22

Quarter-finals
(Chinese Taipei) Chen H-l (Chinese Taipei) Lin Ye-j	17	21	22
8	(Indonesia) M Ahsan (Indonesia) B Septano	21	18	20

==== Section 2 ====
First round
3	(Hong Kong) Hui W H (Hong Kong) A T Putra	21	20
(Thailand) P Chalardchaleam (Thailand) N Narkthong	23	22
(Indonesia) Fr Kurniawan (Indonesia) R Wijaya	21	21
(Thailand) K Phisetsarasai (Thailand) N Saengsila	16	19
7	(South Korea) Cho G-w (South Korea) Kang M-w	21	21
(Vietnam) Dương B Đ (Vietnam) Phạm C H	7	11
Q1	(Vietnam) Nguyễn M T (Vietnam) Nguyễn Q P	8	8
(Malaysia) Au K L (Malaysia) Goh Y J	21	21

Second round
(Thailand) P Chalardchaleam (Thailand) N Narkthong	13	18
(Indonesia) Fr Kurniawan (Indonesia) R Wijaya	21	21
7	(South Korea) Cho G-w (South Korea) Kang M-w	21	21
(Malaysia) Au K L (Malaysia) Goh Y J	11	14

Quarter-finals
(Indonesia) Fr Kurniawan (Indonesia) R Wijaya	21	16	19
7	(South Korea) Cho G-w (South Korea) Kang M-w	19	21	21

=== Bottom half ===
==== Section 3 ====
First round
Q4	(Vietnam) Hà Q T (Vietnam) Nguyễn T T	8	8
(South Korea) Ko S-h (South Korea) Kwon Y-g	21	21
Q3	(Chinese Taipei) Cheng J-y (Chinese Taipei) Chou T-c	12	19
6	(Indonesia) Y S Dasuki (Indonesia) R Sukmawan	21	21
(Malaysia) Chan P S (Malaysia) Chang H P	21	16	21
(Thailand) W Bunwiroon (Thailand) S Jantharasom	17	21	14
(Vietnam) Huỳnh N K (Vietnam) Văn T K	14	13
4	(Malaysia) Chew C E (Malaysia) Hong C H	21	21

Second round
(South Korea) Ko S-h (South Korea) Kwon Y-g	21	19	21
6	(Indonesia) Y S Dasuki (Indonesia) R Sukmawan	12	21	19
(Malaysia) Chan P S (Malaysia) Chang H P	14	16
4	(Malaysia) Chew C E (Malaysia) Hong C H	21	21

Quarter-finals
(South Korea) Ko S-h (South Korea) Kwon Y-g	22	21
4	(Malaysia) Chew C E (Malaysia) Hong C H	20	18

==== Section 4 ====
First round
Q2	(Chinese Taipei) Chen C-h (Chinese Taipei) Lin Yu-j	14	21	13
(Vietnam) Nguyễn H H (Vietnam) Nguyễn H G	21	11	21
(Indonesia) L Lie (Indonesia) Fe Kurniawan	12	10
5	(Malaysia) Gan T C (Malaysia) R Lin W F	21	21
(Australia) C Whitehead (Australia) M Prior	17	16
(Vietnam) Bùi B Đ (Vietnam) Đào M T	21	21
(Laos) P Fongmalayseng (Laos) V Philavanh	8	11
2	(Chinese Taipei) Chien Y-h (Chinese Taipei) Lin Y-l	21	21

Second round
(Vietnam) Nguyễn H H (Vietnam) Nguyễn H G	10	10
5	(Malaysia) Gan T C (Malaysia) R Lin W F	21	21
(Vietnam) Bùi B Đ (Vietnam) Đào M T	10	19
2	(Chinese Taipei) Chien Y-h (Chinese Taipei) Lin Y-l	21	21

Quarter-finals
5	(Malaysia) Gan T C (Malaysia) R Lin W F	21	17	16
2	(Chinese Taipei) Chien Y-h (Chinese Taipei) Lin Y-l	8	21	21

== Women's doubles ==
=== Seeds ===
1. (Indonesia) Shendy Puspa Irawati / Meiliana Jauhari (quarter-finals)
2. (Hong Kong) Chau Hoi Wah / Koon Wai Chee (final)
3. (Malaysia) Fong Chew Yen / Mooi Hing Yau (withdrew)
4. (Chinese Taipei) Tsai Pei-ling / Yang Chia-chen (semi-finals)

=== Finals ===
Semi-finals
(Indonesia) Natalia Christine Poluakan (Indonesia) Yulianti	21	21
(Vietnam) Trần Thị Thanh Thảo (Vietnam) Lê Thị Mai Anh	11	8
4	(Chinese Taipei) Tsai Pei-ling (Chinese Taipei) Yang Chia-chen	14	15
2	(Hong Kong) Chau Hoi Wah (Hong Kong) Koon Wai Chee	21	21

Final
(Indonesia) Natalia Christine Poluakan (Indonesia) Yulianti	21	21
2	(Hong Kong) Chau Hoi Wah (Hong Kong) Koon Wai Chee	19	15

=== Top half ===
==== Section 1 ====
First round
(Indonesia) N C Poluakan (Indonesia) Yulianti	21	21
(Vietnam) Đặng K N (Vietnam) Đoạn K C	10	6

Second round
1	(Indonesia) S P Irawati (Indonesia) M Jauhari	21	21
(Chinese Taipei) Chang L-yin (Chinese Taipei) Hung S-c	11	7
(Thailand) S Chansrisukot (Thailand) M Meemeak	15	16
(Indonesia) N C Poluakan (Indonesia) Yulianti	21	21

Quarter-finals
1	(Indonesia) S P Irawati (Indonesia) M Jauhari	20	16
(Indonesia) N C Poluakan (Indonesia) Yulianti	22	21

==== Section 2 ====
First round
(Vietnam) Phùng N P N (Vietnam) Phí T Q M	5	24	15
(Chinese Taipei) Hsieh P-c (Chinese Taipei) Lee T-a	21	22	21

Second round
3	(Malaysia) Fong C Y (Malaysia) Mooi H Y
(Vietnam) Phạm N T (Vietnam) Nguyễn T M T	w	/	o
(Vietnam) Trần T T T (Vietnam) Lê T M A	21	15	21
(Chinese Taipei) Hsieh P-c (Chinese Taipei) Lee T-a	16	21	15

Quarter-finals
(Vietnam) Phạm N T (Vietnam) Nguyễn T M T	4	5
(Vietnam) Trần T T T (Vietnam) Lê T M A	21	21

=== Bottom half ===
==== Section 3 ====
First round
(Indonesia) N Melati (Indonesia) D T Permatasari	w	/	o
(Malaysia) Chor H Y (Malaysia) Ooi S A
(China) Yu Y (China) Zhao TT
(Vietnam) Phạm T T (Vietnam) Vũ T T	w	/	o

Second round
(Indonesia) N Melati (Indonesia) D T Permatasari	21	21
(Vietnam) Nguyễn T B T (Vietnam) Vũ T H L	3	5
(Vietnam) Phạm T T (Vietnam) Vũ T T	15	10
4	(Chinese Taipei) Tsai P-l (Chinese Taipei) Yang C-c	21	21

Quarter-finals
(Indonesia) N Melati (Indonesia) D T Permatasari	15	20
4	(Chinese Taipei) Tsai P-l (Chinese Taipei) Yang C-c	21	22

==== Section 4 ====
First round
(Australia) E Caroll (Australia) F M Cheah	13	21	12
(Vietnam) Nguyễn T N T (Vietnam) Nguyễn T H A	21	15	21

Second round
(Vietnam) Nguyễn T N T (Vietnam) Nguyễn T H A	14	19
(Vietnam) Nguyễn T S (Vietnam) Vũ T T	21	21
(Malaysia) Lim Y L (Malaysia) Ng P L	15	13
2	(Hong Kong) Chau H W (Hong Kong) Koon W C	21	21

Quarter-finals
(Vietnam) Nguyễn T S (Vietnam) Vũ T T	6	16
2	(Hong Kong) Chau H W (Hong Kong) Koon W C	21	21

== Mixed doubles ==
=== Seeds ===
1. (Philippines) Kennevic Asuncion / Kennie Asuncion (second round)
2. (Hong Kong) Alroy Tanama Putra / Koon Wai Chee (quarter-finals)
3. (New Zealand) Craig Cooper / Renee Flavell (semi-finals)
4. (Ukraine) Valeriy Atrashchenkov / Elena Prus (second round)

=== Finals ===
Semi-finals
(Indonesia) Muhammad Rijal (Indonesia) Devi Tika Permatasari	11	18
(Hong Kong) Hui Wai Ho (Hong Kong) Chau Hoi Wah	21	21
3	(New Zealand) Craig Cooper (New Zealand) Renee Flavell	17	21	20
(Indonesia) Tontowi Ahmad (Indonesia) Yulianti	21	19	22

Final
(Hong Kong) Hui Wai Ho (Hong Kong) Chau Hoi Wah	11	13
(Indonesia) Tontowi Ahmad (Indonesia) Yulianti	21	21

=== Top half ===
==== Section 1 ====
First round
(Vietnam) Nguyễn H G (Vietnam) Vũ T T	12	26
(Indonesia) M Rijal (Indonesia) D T Permatasari	21	28
(Indonesia) Fr Kurniawan (Indonesia) S P Irawati	22	21
(Chinese Taipei) Chen H-l (Chinese Taipei) Hsieh P-c	20	17
SUB	(Indonesia) I V Okvana (Indonesia) N C Poluakan	21	20	11
(Vietnam) Dương B Đ (Vietnam) Thái T H G	14	22	21

Second round
1	(Philippines) Kennevic Asuncion (Philippines) Kennie Asuncion	11	15
(Indonesia) M Rijal (Indonesia) D T Permatasari	21	21
(Indonesia) Fr Kurniawan (Indonesia) S P Irawati	21	21
(Vietnam) Dương B Đ (Vietnam) Thái T H G	13	10

Quarter-finals
(Indonesia) M Rijal (Indonesia) D T Permatasari	21	21	21
(Indonesia) Fr Kurniawan (Indonesia) S P Irawati	23	17	11

==== Section 2 ====
First round
4	(Ukraine) V Atrashchenkov (Ukraine) E Prus	21	21
(Malaysia) Chan P S (Malaysia) Lim Y L	13	15
(Hong Kong) Hui W H (Hong Kong) Chau H W	21	21
(Vietnam) Nguyễn N M (Vietnam) Phạm T T	11	15
(South Korea) Ko S-h (South Korea) Kim M-h	21	21
(Australia) B Walklate (Australia) E Carroll	9	16
(Vietnam) Lương H Đ (Vietnam) Nguyễn N A	8	12
(Indonesia) Y S Dasuki (Indonesia) M Jauhari	21	21

Second round
4	(Ukraine) V Atrashchenkov (Ukraine) E Prus	15	16
(Hong Kong) Hui W H (Hong Kong) Chau H W	21	21
(South Korea) Ko S-h (South Korea) Kim M-h	16	23	11
(Indonesia) Y S Dasuki (Indonesia) M Jauhari	21	21	21

Quarter-finals
(Hong Kong) Hui W H (Hong Kong) Chau H W	23	15	21
(Indonesia) Y S Dasuki (Indonesia) M Jauhari	21	21	14

=== Bottom half ===
==== Section 3 ====
First round
(Vietnam) Nguyễn H H Phí T Q M	21	13	15
(Chinese Taipei) Cheng J-y (Chinese Taipei) Lee T-a	15	21	21
(Vietnam) Nguyễn H N (Vietnam) Lê T T T	w	/	o
(Malaysia) Au K L (Malaysia) J Quay
(Vietnam) Huỳnh N K (Vietnam) Trần T T T	22	22
(Malaysia) M R Abdul Latif (Malaysia) M Ng	20	20
(Vietnam) Đào M T (Vietnam) Nguyễn T H A	10	21	16
3	(New Zealand) C Cooper (New Zealand) R Flavell	21	18	21

Second round
(Chinese Taipei) Cheng J-y (Chinese Taipei) Lee T-a	24	21	16
(Vietnam) Nguyễn H N (Vietnam) Lê T T T	26	23	21
(Vietnam) Huỳnh N K (Vietnam) Trần T T T	21	11
3	(New Zealand) C Cooper (New Zealand) R Flavell	23	21

Quarter-finals
(Vietnam) Nguyễn H N (Vietnam) Lê T T T	19	7
3	(New Zealand) C Cooper (New Zealand) R Flavell	21	21

==== Section 4 ====
First round
(South Korea) Cho G-w (South Korea) Jang S-y	21	21
(Vietnam) Trần H Q (Vietnam) Nguyễn T B T	12	10
(Indonesia) T Ahmad (Indonesia) Yulianti	21	21
(Vietnam) Bùi B Đ (Vietnam) Nguyễn T N T	16	8
(Australia) M Prior (Australia) F M Cheah	w	/	o
(Malaysia) Ooi S A (Malaysia) Goh Y J

Second round
(South Korea) Cho G-w (South Korea) Jang S-y	12	19
(Indonesia) T Ahmad (Indonesia) Yulianti	21	21
(Australia) M Prior (Australia) F M Cheah	11	11
2	(Hong Kong) A T Putra (Hong Kong) Koon W C	21	21

Quarter-finals
(Indonesia) T Ahmad (Indonesia) Yulianti	21	21
2	(Hong Kong) A T Putra (Hong Kong) Koon W C	16	17

Preceded by 2007 Dutch Open Grand Prix	2007 BWF Grand Prix Gold and Grand Prix; 2007 BWF season	Succeeded by 2007 Russian Open Grand Prix Gold
