= 2007 Chinese Taipei Open Grand Prix Gold =

Tournament details
- Dates: September 18, 2007 – September 23, 2007
- Edition: 26th
- Level: Grand Prix Gold
- Total prize money: US$170,000
- Venue: Xinzhuang Gymnasium
- Location: Taipei County, Taiwan

Champions
- Men's singles: (Indonesia) Sony Dwi Kuncoro
- Women's singles: (Hong Kong) Wang Chen
- Men's doubles: (Indonesia) Markis Kido (Indonesia) Hendra Setiawan
- Women's doubles: (Chinese Taipei) Cheng Wen-hsing (Chinese Taipei) Chien Yu-chin
- Mixed doubles: (Indonesia) Flandy Limpele (Indonesia) Vita Marissa

The 2007 Chinese Taipei Open Grand Prix Gold (officially known as the Yonex Chinese Taipei Grand Prix Gold 2007 for sponsorship reasons) was a badminton tournament which took place in Taipei County, Taiwan from 18 to 23 September 2007. It had a total purse of $170,000.

== Tournament ==
The 2007 Chinese Taipei Open Grand Prix Gold was the sixth tournament of the 2007 BWF Grand Prix Gold and Grand Prix and also part of the Chinese Taipei Open championships, which had been held since 1980.

=== Venue ===
This international tournament was held at Xinzhuang Gymnasium in Taipei County, Taiwan.

=== Point distribution ===
Below is the point distribution for each phase of the tournament based on the BWF points system for the BWF Grand Prix Gold event.

Winner	Runner-up	3/4	5/8	9/16	17/32	33/64	65/128	129/256
7,000	5,950	4,900	3,850	2,750	1,670	660	320	130

=== Prize money ===
The total prize money for this tournament was US$170,000. Distribution of prize money was in accordance with BWF regulations.

Event	Winner	Finals	Semi-finals	Quarter-finals	Last 16
Singles	$12,750	$6,460	$2,465	$900	$595
Doubles	$13,430	$6,460	$2,380	$1,232.5	$637.5

== Men's singles ==
=== Seeds ===
1. (China) Chen Hong (quarter-finals)
2. (Malaysia) Lee Chong Wei (quarter-finals)
3. (Denmark) Peter Gade (third round)
4. (Indonesia) Sony Dwi Kuncoro (champion)
5. (Indonesia) Taufik Hidayat (final)
6. (Thailand) Boonsak Ponsana (third round)
7. (Singapore) Ronald Susilo (first round)
8. (Japan) Shōji Satō (quarter-finals)
9. (Malaysia) Muhammad Hafiz Hashim (third round)
10. (Indonesia) Simon Santoso (semi-finals)
11. (South Korea) Park Sung-hwan (third round)
12. (Netherlands) Dicky Palyama (second round)
13. (Malaysia) Wong Choong Hann (quarter-finals)
14. (Hong Kong) Ng Wei (third round)
15. (England) Andrew Smith (second round)

=== Finals ===
Semi-finals
5	(Indonesia) Taufik Hidayat	21	17	21
(South Korea) Lee Hyun-il	13	21	15
4	(Indonesia) Sony Dwi Kuncoro	23	21	21
10	(Indonesia) Simon Santoso	25	19	15

Final
5	(Indonesia) Taufik Hidayat	21	6	13
4	(Indonesia) Sony Dwi Kuncoro	18	21	21

=== Top half ===
==== Section 1 ====
First Round
1	(China) Chen H	23	23
(Malaysia) K Lim	21	21
(United States) R Rai	16	21	19
(Indonesia) A Adityawarman	21	16	21
16	(England) A Smith	21	21
(Chinese Taipei) Chang F-p	11	8
(Hong Kong) Chan Y K	21	15	24
(Malaysia) Chan K B	9	21	22
5	(Indonesia) T Hidayat	21	21
(Chinese Taipei) Cheng C-h	19	11
(Thailand) P Sapkulchananart	21	21
(Malaysia) Pei W C	8	16
9	(Malaysia) M H Hashim	21	21
(Japan) K Saeki	18	9
(Chinese Taipei) Liao S-s	21	21
(India) Parupalli K	13	12

Second Round
1	(China) Chen H	21	21
(Indonesia) A Adityawarman	11	17
16	(England) A Smith	14	21	9
(Hong Kong) Chan Y K	21	19	21
5	(Indonesia) T Hidayat	26	19	21
(Thailand) P Sapkulchananart	24	21	18
9	(Malaysia) M H Hashim	21	21
(Chinese Taipei) Liao S-s	9	14

Third Round
1	(China) Chen H	21	19	21
(Hong Kong) Chan Y K	15	21	12
5	(Indonesia) T Hidayat	21	21
9	(Malaysia) M H Hashim	12	15

Quarter-finals
1	(China) Chen H	16	20
5	(Indonesia) T Hidayat	21	22

==== Section 2 ====
First Round
3	(Denmark) P Gade	21	21
(Japan) K Tago	15	12
(Singapore) K Lee Y H	21	21
(Chinese Taipei) Chin S-m	15	9
PFQ	(Chinese Taipei) Chang J-s	21	11	21
(Chinese Taipei) Chang C-h	18	21	16
(South Korea) Lee H-i	21	17	21
(Indonesia) A K Tedjono	7	21	7
8	(Japan) S Satō	21	21
Q3	(Chinese Taipei) Yang T-f	12	11
(Philippines) K Asuncion	22	10	14
(Malaysia) Lim F Y	20	21	21
12	(Netherlands) D Palyama	21	21
(Chinese Taipei) Shih K-c	16	14
(Thailand) T Saesomboonsuk	21	17	10
(Malaysia) S A Ayob	16	21	21

Second Round
3	(Denmark) P Gade	21	21
(Singapore) K Lee Y H	10	9
PFQ	(Chinese Taipei) Chang J-s	6	19
(South Korea) Lee H-i	21	21
8	(Japan) S Satō	22	21
(Malaysia) Lim F Y	20	19
12	(Netherlands) D Palyama	9	12
(Malaysia) S A Ayob	21	21

Third Round
3	(Denmark) P Gade	25	14
(South Korea) Lee H-i	27	21
8	(Japan) S Satō	14	22	21
(Malaysia) S A Ayob	21	20	13

Quarter-finals
(South Korea) Lee H-i	21	21
8	(Japan) S Satō	18	13

=== Bottom half ===
==== Section 3 ====
First Round
(Chinese Taipei) Kuo T-h	21	9	10
Q2	(Chinese Taipei) Hsueh H-y	16	21	21
(Thailand) P Vilailak	17	15
13	(Malaysia) Wong C H	21	21
(Chinese Taipei) Lee C-y	21	21
(Philippines) A Mailon	2	6
(Malaysia) Yeoh K B	21	15	22
7	(Singapore) R Susilo	18	21	20
Q1	(Chinese Taipei) Feng C-h	21	13
(Denmark) J Persson	23	21
(Malaysia) Tan C S	10	13
11	(South Korea) Park S-h	21	21
(Chinese Taipei) Chou T-c	12	15
(Japan) S Sasaki	21	21
(Hong Kong) Wong W H	17	11
4	(Indonesia) S D Kuncoro	21	21

Second Round
Q2	(Chinese Taipei) Hsueh H-y	14	11
13	(Malaysia) Wong C H	21	21
(Chinese Taipei) Lee C-y	15	9
(Malaysia) Yeoh K B	21	21
(Denmark) J Persson	21	24	5
11	(South Korea) Park S-h	17	26	21
(Japan) S Sasaki	8	21	17
4	(Indonesia) S D Kuncoro	21	19	21

Third Round
13	(Malaysia) Wong C H	21	21
(Malaysia) Yeoh K B	16	13
11	(South Korea) Park S-h	16	21	13
4	(Indonesia) S D Kuncoro	21	9	21

Quarter-finals
13	(Malaysia) Wong C H	16	11
4	(Indonesia) S D Kuncoro	21	21

==== Section 4 ====
First Round
(Malaysia) M A Abdul Latif	21	21
(South Korea) Lee C-h	18	14
(France) B Leverdez	7	13
10	(Indonesia) S Santoso	21	21
(Australia) J Tho	11	14
(Chinese Taipei) Hsieh Y-h	21	21
(Malaysia) R Hashim	13	18
6	(Thailand) B Ponsana	21	21
(Chinese Taipei) Hsu J-h	11	4
(Netherlands) E Pang	21	21
(Malaysia) Liew D	14	13
15	(Hong Kong) Ng W	21	21
(Japan) Y Nakanishi	21	21
(United States) E Go	4	9
(Indonesia) A Y W Hartanto	10	16
2	(Malaysia) Lee C W	21	21

Second Round
(Malaysia) M A Abdul Latif	10	9
10	(Indonesia) S Santoso	21	21
(Chinese Taipei) Hsieh Y-h	9	16
6	(Thailand) B Ponsana	21	21
(Netherlands) E Pang	15	13
15	(Hong Kong) Ng W	21	21
(Japan) Y Nakanishi	9	13
2	(Malaysia) Lee C W	21	21

Third Round
10	(Indonesia) S Santoso	21	21
6	(Thailand) B Ponsana	19	12
15	(Hong Kong) Ng W	9	16
2	(Malaysia) Lee C W	21	21

Quarter-finals
10	(Indonesia) S Santoso	21	12	21
2	(Malaysia) Lee C W	16	21	13

== Women's singles ==
=== Seeds ===
1. (Hong Kong) Wang Chen (champion)
2. (France) Pi Hongyan (final)
3. (Malaysia) Wong Mew Choo (quarter-finals)
4. (Netherlands) Yao Jie (semi-finals)
5. (Denmark) Tine Rasmussen (first round)
6. (Hong Kong) Yip Pui Yin (semi-finals)
7. (England) Tracey Hallam (first round)
8. (Japan) Kaori Mori (first round)

=== Finals ===
Semi-finals
1	(Hong Kong) Wang Chen	21	23
4	(Netherlands) Yao Jie	14	21
6	(Hong Kong) Yip Pui Yin	15	16
2	(France) Pi Hongyan	21	21

Final
1	(Hong Kong) Wang Chen	21	14	26
2	(France) Pi Hongyan	18	21	24

=== Top half ===
==== Section 1 ====
First Round
1	(Hong Kong) Wang C	21	21
(Japan) K Yonekura	15	12
(Canada) C Reid	13	21	21
(United States) E Lee	21	16	16
5	(Denmark) T Rasmussen	21	13	16
(Germany) J Schenk	10	21	21
(Malaysia) J Wong P X	14	21	21
(Chinese Taipei) Pai M-j	21	18	13

Second Round
1	(Hong Kong) Wang C	21	21
(Canada) C Reid	3	7
(Germany) J Schenk	21	21
(Malaysia) J Wong P X	16	17

Quarter-finals
1	(Hong Kong) Wang C	19	22	21
(Germany) J Schenk	21	20	16

==== Section 2 ====
First Round
4	(Netherlands) Yao J	21	11	21
(Japan) Y Hirayama	19	21	12
Q2	(Chinese Taipei) Chiu Y-j	21	9	22
(Singapore) Xing AY	12	21	24
7	(England) T Hallam	11	19
(Indonesia) M K Yulianti	21	21
Q1	(South Korea) Kim M-h	13	14
(Thailand) S Ponsana	21	21

Second Round
4	(Netherlands) Yao J	10	21	21
(Singapore) Xing AY	21	13	19
(Indonesia) M K Yulianti	13	21	21
(Thailand) S Ponsana	21	13	19

Quarter-finals
4	(Netherlands) Yao J	16	21	21
(Indonesia) M K Yulianti	21	13	11

=== Bottom half ===
==== Section 3 ====
First Round
(Thailand) S Chansrisukot	10	13
(Indonesia) A Firdasari	21	21
(Chinese Taipei) Cheng S-c	18	11
6	(Hong Kong) Yip P Y	21	21
(Finland) A Nieminen	12	16
(Singapore) Li L	21	21
(South Korea) Jang S-y	21	15
3	(Malaysia) Wong M C	23	21

Second Round
(Indonesia) A Firdasari	17	21	15
6	(Hong Kong) Yip P Y	21	10	21
(Singapore) Li L	21	4
3	(Malaysia) Wong M C	23	21

Quarter-finals
6	(Hong Kong) Yip P Y	21	21
3	(Malaysia) Wong M C	15	14

==== Section 4 ====
First Round
(Hong Kong) Zhou M	21	21
Q3	(South Korea) Jun J-y	11	16
(Netherlands) J Meulendijks	21	21
8	(Japan) K Mori	10	14
Q4	(Japan) M Fujii	19	11
(Thailand) M Meemeak	21	21
(India) S Nehwal	14	11
2	(France) Pi HY	21	21

Second Round
(Hong Kong) Zhou M	19	21
(Netherlands) J Meulendijks	21	23
(Thailand) M Meemeak	14	13
2	(France) Pi HY	21	21

Quarter-finals
(Netherlands) J Meulendijks	22	5	13
2	(France) Pi HY	20	21	21

== Men's doubles ==
=== Seeds ===
1. (Indonesia) Markis Kido / Hendra Setiawan (champions)
2. (South Korea) Jung Jae-sung / Lee Yong-dae (quarter-finals)
3. (South Korea) Lee Jae-jin / Hwang Ji-man (first round)
4. (Indonesia) Luluk Hadiyanto / Alvent Yulianto (quarter-finals)
5. (Japan) Shuichi Sakamoto / Shintaro Ikeda (quarter-finals)
6. (Indonesia) Hendra Aprida Gunawan / Joko Riyadi (semi-finals)
7. (Denmark) Lars Paaske / Jonas Rasmussen (final)
8. (Malaysia) Mohd Zakry Abdul Latif / Mohd Fairuzizuan Mohd Tazari (semi-finals)

=== Finals ===
Semi-finals
1	(Indonesia) Markis Kido (Indonesia) Hendra Setiawan	14	21	21
6	(Indonesia) Hendra Aprida Gunawan (Indonesia) Joko Riyadi	21	13	15
8	(Malaysia) Mohd Zakry Abdul Latif (Malaysia) Mohd Fairuzizuan Mohd Tazari	24	19	9
7	(Denmark) Lars Paaske (Denmark) Jonas Rasmussen	22	21	21

Final
1	(Indonesia) Markis Kido (Indonesia) Hendra Setiawan	21	21
7	(Denmark) Lars Paaske (Denmark) Jonas Rasmussen	17	12

=== Top half ===
==== Section 1 ====
First Round
1	(Indonesia) M Kido (Indonesia) H Setiawan	21	21
(Hong Kong) A S Njoto (Hong Kong) Y H Wiratama	14	9
(Malaysia) Tan B S (Malaysia) Ong S H	21	21
Q4	(Chinese Taipei) Cheng H-y (Chinese Taipei) Lin W-h	11	13
5	(Japan) S Sakamoto (Japan) S Ikeda	15	21	21
(Chinese Taipei) Fang C-m (Chinese Taipei) Lee S-m	21	19	10
(Denmark) S Mollyhus (Denmark) A Kristiansen	21	21
(Australia) G Warfe (Australia) R Smith	10	15

Second Round
1	(Indonesia) M Kido (Indonesia) H Setiawan	21	21
(Malaysia) Tan B S (Malaysia) Ong S H	10	12
5	(Japan) S Sakamoto (Japan) S Ikeda	21	17	21
(Denmark) S Mollyhus (Denmark) A Kristiansen	13	21	15

Quarter-finals
1	(Indonesia) M Kido (Indonesia) H Setiawan	21	19	21
5	(Japan) S Sakamoto (Japan) S Ikeda	11	21	17

==== Section 2 ====
First Round
3	(South Korea) Lee J-j (South Korea) Hwang J-m	18	19
(Indonesia) R Sukmawan (Indonesia) Y S Dasuki	21	21
(Malaysia) Chan P S (Malaysia) Chang H P	11	12
(Denmark) M Boe (Denmark) C Mogensen	21	21
6	(Indonesia) H A Gunawan (Indonesia) J Riyadi'	21	21
(Japan) N Kawamae (Japan) K Kawaguchi	9	13
Q1	(Chinese Taipei) Liao M-c (Chinese Taipei) Wang C-m	17	12
(Chinese Taipei) Tsai C-h (Chinese Taipei) Hu C-h	21	21

Second Round
(Indonesia) R Sukmawan (Indonesia) Y S Dasuki	21	10
(Denmark) M Boe (Denmark) C Mogensen	23	21
6	(Indonesia) H A Gunawan (Indonesia) J Riyadi	21	21
(Chinese Taipei) Tsai C-h (Chinese Taipei) Hu C-h	14	14

Quarter-finals
(Denmark) M Boe (Denmark) C Mogensen	18	21	18
6	(Indonesia) H A Gunawan (Indonesia) J Riyadi	21	14	21

=== Bottom half ===
==== Section 3 ====
First Round
Q3	(Chinese Taipei) Chen H-l (Chinese Taipei) Lin Y-j	21	18	17
(Hong Kong) Hui W H (Hong Kong) A T Putra	18	21	21
(Japan) T Ōtsuka (Japan) K Masuda	13	13
8	(Malaysia) M Z Abdul Latif (Malaysia) M F Mohd Tazari	21	21
(Australia) A Brehaut (Australia) A B Sindoro	18	15
(Thailand) S Prapakamol (Thailand) P Ngernsrisuk	21	21
(Malaysia) Chew C E (Malaysia) Hong C H	7	21	14
4	(Indonesia) L Hadiyanto (Indonesia) A Yulianto	21	18	21

Second Round
(Hong Kong) Hui W H (Hong Kong) A T Putra	19	14
8	(Malaysia) M Z Abdul Latif (Malaysia) M F Mohd Tazari	21	21
(Thailand) S Prapakamol (Thailand) P Ngernsrisuk	20	18
4	(Indonesia) L Hadiyanto (Indonesia) A Yulianto	22	21

Quarter-finals
8	(Malaysia) M Z Abdul Latif (Malaysia) M F Mohd Tazari	21	21
4	(Indonesia) L Hadiyanto (Indonesia) A Yulianto	19	14

==== Section 4 ====
First Round
(Indonesia) B Septano (Indonesia) A Ahsan	19	21	20
(Malaysia) Khoo C C (Malaysia) M R Abdul Latif	21	19	22
(United States) H Bach (United States) K Malaythong	24	10
7	(Denmark) L Paaske (Denmark) J Rasmussen	26	21
(Singapore) H Suputra (Singapore) H Wijaya	17	21	21
(Chinese Taipei) Chein Y-h (Chinese Taipei) Lin Y-l	21	16	11
Q2	(Malaysia) Ong J G (Malaysia) Goh W S	10	21	16
2	(South Korea) Jung J-s (South Korea) Lee Y-d	21	17	21

Second Round
(Malaysia) Khoo C C (Malaysia) M R Abdul Latif	18	18
7	(Denmark) L Paaske (Denmark) J Rasmussen	21	21
(Singapore) H Suputra (Singapore) H Wijaya	12	14
2	(South Korea) Jung J-s (South Korea) Lee Y-d	21	21

Quarter-finals
7	(Denmark) L Paaske (Denmark) J Rasmussen	21	13	24
2	(South Korea) Jung J-s (South Korea) Lee Y-d	16	21	22

== Women's doubles ==
=== Seeds ===
1. (Chinese Taipei) Chien Yu-chin / Cheng Wen-hsing (champions)
2. (Japan) Kumiko Ogura / Reiko Shiota (quarter-finals)
3. (Malaysia) Wong Pei Tty / Chin Eei Hui (semi-finals)
4. (Singapore) Jiang Yanmei / Li Yujia (second round)
5. (South Korea) Lee Kyung-won / Lee Hyo-jung (semi-finals)
6. (Indonesia) Endang Nursugianti / Rani Mundiasti (second round)
7. (Japan) Aki Akao / Tomomi Matsuda (first round)
8. (Japan) Miyuki Maeda / Satoko Suetsuna (quarter-finals)

=== Finals ===
Semi-finals
1	(Chinese Taipei) Chien Yu-chin (Chinese Taipei) Cheng Wen-hsing	23	15	21
3	(Malaysia) Wong Pei Tty (Malaysia) Chin Eei Hui	21	21	18
(Indonesia) Liliyana Natsir (Indonesia) Vita Marissa	21	21
5	(South Korea) Lee Kyung-won (South Korea) Lee Hyo-jung	18	4

Final
1	(Chinese Taipei) Chien Yu-chin (Chinese Taipei) Cheng Wen-hsing	21	17	21
(Indonesia) Liliyana Natsir (Indonesia) Vita Marissa	15	21	18

=== Top half ===
==== Section 1 ====
First Round
1	(Chinese Taipei) Chien Y-c (Chinese Taipei) Cheng W-h	21	21
(Hong Kong) Wong S Y (Hong Kong) Fung Y	6	11
(Canada) F McKee (Canada) C Reid	21	21
Q4	(Chinese Taipei) Huang M-c (Chinese Taipei) Chen H-y	15	11
7	(Japan) A Akao (Japan) T Matsuda	16	16
(South Korea) Ha J-e (South Korea) Kim M-j	21	21
(Indonesia) R P Dili (Indonesia) Yulianti	13	12
(Malaysia) Ng H L (Malaysia) Goh L Y	21	21

Second Round
1	(Chinese Taipei) Chien Y-c (Chinese Taipei) Cheng W-h	21	21
(Canada) F McKee (Canada) C Reid	18	11
(South Korea) Ha J-e (South Korea) Kim M-j	21	21
(Malaysia) Ng H L (Malaysia) Goh L Y	13	16

Quarter-finals
1	(Chinese Taipei) Chien Y-c (Chinese Taipei) Cheng W-h	21	21
(South Korea) Ha J-e (South Korea) Kim M-j	16	13

==== Section 2 ====
First Round
3	(Malaysia) Wong P T (Malaysia) Chin E H	21	21
(United States) E Lee (United States) M Mangkalakiri	5	11
(Denmark) L Frier Kristiansen (Denmark) K R Juhl	25	21
(Chinese Taipei) Cheng H-y (Chinese Taipei) Chang Y-j	23	14
6	(Indonesia) E Nirsugianti (Indonesia) R Mundiasti	21	21
(Hong Kong) Ng K S (Hong Kong) Mong K Y	8	12
Q2	(Chinese Taipei) Peng H-c (Chinese Taipei) Cheng W-h	13	9
(Germany) N Grether (Germany) J Schenk	21	21

Second Round
3	(Malaysia) Wong P T (Malaysia) Chin E H	21	21
(Denmark) L Frier Kristiansen (Denmark) K R Juhl	10	9
6	(Indonesia) E Nirsugianti (Indonesia) R Mundiasti	18	21
(Germany) N Grether (Germany) J Schenk	21	23

Quarter-finals
3	(Malaysia) Wong P T (Malaysia) Chin E H	22	21
(Germany) N Grether (Germany) J Schenk	20	16

=== Bottom half ===
==== Section 3 ====
First Round
(Indonesia) N K Maheswari (Indonesia) L Nurlita	21	21
(Chinese Taipei) Chou C-c (Chinese Taipei) Ku P-t	14	18
(Hong Kong) Chau H W (Hong Kong) Koon W C	10	16
8	(Japan) M Maeda (Japan) S Suetsuna	21	21
(Indonesia) L Natsir (Indonesia) V Marissa	22	21
(Malaysia) Fong C Y (Malaysia) Mooi H Y	20	6
Q1	(Chinese Taipei) Liu S-c (Chinese Taipei) Wang P-r	12	8
4	(Singapore) Jiang YM (Singapore) Li YJ	21	21

Second Round
(Indonesia) N K Maheswari (Indonesia) L Nurlita	21	15	17
8	(Japan) M Maeda (Japan) S Suetsuna	17	21	21
(Indonesia) L Natsir (Indonesia) V Marissa	21	21
4	(Singapore) Jiang YM (Singapore) Li YJ	13	17

Quarter-finals
8	(Japan) M Maeda (Japan) S Suetsuna	16	21	16
(Indonesia) L Natsir (Indonesia) V Marissa	21	9	21

==== Section 4 ====
First Round
(Malaysia) Lim P S (Malaysia) Haw C H	21	21
(Indonesia) M Jauhari (Indonesia) S P Irawati	18	13
(Hong Kong) Wong M C (Hong Kong) Lam S Y	18	13
5	(South Korea) Lee K-w (South Korea) Lee H-j	21'	21
(Australia) T Luiz (Australia) E Tanaka
Q3	(Chinese Taipei) Tsai P-l (Chinese Taipei) Yang C-c	w	/	o
(Malaysia) Chong S C (Malaysia) A A Anscelly	7	11
2	(Japan) K Ogura (Japan) R Shiota	21	21

Second Round
(Malaysia) Lim P S (Malaysia) Haw C H	17	13
5	(South Korea) Lee K-w (South Korea) Lee H-j	21	21
Q3	(Chinese Taipei) Tsai P-l (Chinese Taipei) Yang C-c	13	10
2	(Japan) K Ogura (Japan) R Shiota	21	21

Quarter-finals
5	(South Korea) Lee K-w (South Korea) Lee H-j	21	21
2	(Japan) K Ogura (Japan) R Shiota	19	18

== Mixed doubles ==
=== Seeds ===
1. (Indonesia) Nova Widianto / Liliyana Natsir (semi-finals)
2. (Indonesia) Flandy Limpele / Vita Marissa (champions)
3. (Thailand) Sudket Prapakamol / Saralee Thungthongkam (quarter-finals)
4. (Denmark) Thomas Laybourn / Kamilla Rytter Juhl (final)
5. (South Korea) Han Sang-hoon / Lee Hyo-jung (semi-finals)
6. (South Korea) Lee Jae-jin / Hwang Yu-mi (quarter-finals)
7. (Singapore) Hendri Saputra / Li Yujia (quarter-finals)
8. (Indonesia) Devin Lahardi Fitriawan / Lita Nurlita (second round)

=== Finals ===
Semi-finals
1	(Indonesia) Nova Widianto (Indonesia) Liliyana Natsir	21	15	13
4	(Denmark) Thomas Laybourn (Denmark) Kamilla Rytter Juhl	16	21	21
5	(South Korea) Han Sang-hoon (South Korea) Lee Hyo-jung	18	4
2	(Indonesia) Flandy Limpele (Indonesia) Vita Marissa	21	21

Final
4	(Denmark) Thomas Laybourn (Denmark) Kamilla Rytter Juhl	18	23
2	(Indonesia) Flandy Limpele (Indonesia) Vita Marissa	21	25

=== Top half ===
==== Section 1 ====
First Round
1	(Indonesia) N Widianto (Indonesia) L Natsir	21	21
(Hong Kong) Hui W H (Hong Kong) Wong M C	11	15
(Malaysia) Tan W K (Malaysia) Woon K W	15	10
(United States) H Bach (United States) E Lee	21	21
6	(South Korea) Lee J-j (South Korea) Hwang Y-m	22	21
Q1	(Indonesia) Y S Dasuki (Indonesia) M Jauhari	20	17
(Chinese Taipei) Chen H-l (Chinese Taipei) Chou C-c	21	21
(Hong Kong) Lo L K (Hong Kong) Ng K S	11	8

Second Round
1	(Indonesia) N Widianto (Indonesia) L Natsir	21	21
(United States) H Bach (United States) E Lee	8	13
6	(South Korea) Lee J-j (South Korea) Hwang Y-m	21	21
(Chinese Taipei) Chen H-l (Chinese Taipei) Chou C-c	12	16

Quarter-finals
1	(Indonesia) N Widianto (Indonesia) L Natsir	21	21
6	(South Korea) Lee J-j (South Korea) Hwang Y-m	16	10

==== Section 2 ====
First Round
4	(Denmark) T Laybourn (Denmark) K R Juhl	21	22
(Chinese Taipei) Tsai C-h (Chinese Taipei) Cheng S-c	10	20
(Hong Kong) A T Putra (Hong Kong) Koon W C	21	21
(Malaysia) Chan P S (Malaysia) A A Anscelly	16	19
8	(Indonesia) D L Fitriawan (Indonesia) L Nurlita	21	21	21
(Philippines) Kennevic Asuncion (Philippines) Kennie Asuncion	16	23	15
(Japan) T Ōtsuka (Japan) S Suetsuna	13	21	14
(Singapore) H Wijaya (Singapore) Jiang YM	21	15	21

Second Round
4	(Denmark) T Laybourn (Denmark) K R Juhl	21	19	21
(Hong Kong) A T Putra (Hong Kong) Koon W C	17	21	15
8	(Indonesia) D L Fitriawan (Indonesia) L Nurlita	16	7
(Singapore) H Wijaya (Singapore) Jiang YM	21	21

Quarter-finals
4	(Denmark) T Laybourn (Denmark) K R Juhl	21	25
(Singapore) H Wijaya (Singapore) Jiang YM	13	23

=== Bottom half ===
==== Section 3 ====
First Round
(Japan) K Masuda (Japan) M Maeda	21	21
(Hong Kong) Y H Wiratama (Hong Kong) Chau H W	16	18
Q2	(Chinese Taipei) Wang C-m (Chinese Taipei) Wang P-r	17	16
5	(South Korea) Han S-h (South Korea) Lee H-j	21	21
(Chinese Taipei) Fang C-m (Chinese Taipei) Cheng W-h	21	25
(Malaysia) Lim K W (Malaysia) Ng H L	19	23
(Indonesia) T Ahmad (Indonesia) Yulianti	20	14
3	(Thailand) S Prapakamol (Thailand) S Thungthongkam	22	21

Second Round
(Japan) K Masuda (Japan) M Maeda	13	11
5	(South Korea) Han S-h (South Korea) Lee H-j	21	21
(Chinese Taipei) Fang C-m (Chinese Taipei) Cheng W-h	23	15	23
3	(Thailand) S Prapakamol (Thailand) S Thungthongkam	21	21	25

Quarter-finals
5	(South Korea) Han S-h (South Korea) Lee H-j	21	21
3	(Thailand) S Prapakamol (Thailand) S Thungthongkam	18	12

==== Section 4 ====
First Round
(Malaysia) M R Abdul Latif (Malaysia) Chong S C	15	17
(Denmark) J Rasmussen (Denmark) L Frier Kristiansen	21	21
(Indonesia) L Lie (Indonesia) N K Maheswari	11	13
7	(Singapore) H Saputra (Singapore) Li YJ	21	21
(Hong Kong) Lam S Y (Hong Kong) Leung C Y	17	13
(Chinese Taipei) Hsieh Y-h (Chinese Taipei) Chien Y-c	21	21
(South Korea) Lee Y-d (South Korea) Ha J-e	7	21	20
2	(Indonesia) F Limpele (Indonesia) V Marissa	21	18	22

Second Round
(Denmark) J Rasmussen (Denmark) L Frier Kristiansen	12	14
7	(Singapore) H Saputra (Singapore) Li YJ	21	21
(Chinese Taipei) Hsieh Y-h (Chinese Taipei) Chien Y-c	13	11
2	(Indonesia) F Limpele (Indonesia) V Marissa	21	21

Quarter-finals
7	(Singapore) H Saputra (Singapore) Li YJ	21	18	17
2	(Indonesia) F Limpele (Indonesia) V Marissa	18	21	21

Preceded by 2007 U.S. Open Grand Prix	BWF Grand Prix Gold and Grand Prix; 2007 BWF season	Succeeded by 2007 Macau Open Grand Prix Gold
