= 2007 Macau Open Grand Prix Gold =

Tournament details
- Dates: 2 October 2007 – 7 October 2007
- Edition: 2nd
- Level: Grand Prix Gold
- Competitors: 262 from 18 nations
- Total prize money: US$120,000
- Venue: IPM Multisport Pavilion
- Location: Macau

Champions
- Men's singles: (China) Chen Jin
- Women's singles: (China) Xie Xingfang
- Men's doubles: (Malaysia) Koo Kien Keat (Malaysia) Tan Boon Heong
- Women's doubles: (China) Gao Ling (China) Huang Sui
- Mixed doubles: (China) Xie Zhongbo (China) Zhang Yawen

The 2007 Macau Open Grand Prix Gold was a badminton tournament which took place in Macau from 2 to 7 October 2007. It had a total purse of $120,000.

== Tournament ==
The 2007 Macau Open Grand Prix Gold was the seventh tournament of the 2007 BWF Grand Prix Gold and Grand Prix and also part of the Macau Open championships, which had been held since 2006. This tournament was organized by the Badminton Federation of Macau and sanctioned by the BWF.

=== Venue ===
This international tournament was held at IPM Multisport Pavilion in Macau.

=== Point distribution ===
Below is the point distribution for each phase of the tournament based on the BWF points system for the BWF Grand Prix Gold event.

Winner	Runner-up	3/4	5/8	9/16	17/32	33/64	65/128	129/256
7,000	5,950	4,900	3,850	2,750	1,670	660	320	130

=== Prize money ===
The total prize money for this tournament was US$120,000. Distribution of prize money was in accordance with BWF regulations.

Event	Winner	Finals	Semi-finals	Quarter-finals	Last 16
Singles	$9,000	$4,560	$1,740	$720	$420
Doubles	$9,480	$4,560	$1,680	$870	$450

== Men's singles ==
=== Seeds ===
1. (China) Lin Dan (withdrew)
2. (China) Bao Chunlai (quarter-finals)
3. (China) Chen Hong (quarter-finals)
4. (China) Chen Yu (withdrew)
5. (China) Chen Jin (champion)
6. (Indonesia) Taufik Hidayat (final)
7. (Singapore) Ronald Susilo (withdrew)
8. (Japan) Shōji Satō (first round)
9. (Indonesia) Simon Santoso (withdrew)
10. (Malaysia) Wong Choong Hann (semi-finals)
11. (South Korea) Park Sung-hwan (semi-finals)
12. (Hong Kong) Ng Wei (third round)
13. (Singapore) Kendrick Lee Yen Hui (withdrew)
14. (England) Andrew Smith (second round)
15. (Malaysia) Roslin Hashim (quarter-finals)
16. (Hong Kong) Chan Yan Kit (second round)

=== Finals ===
Semi-finals
6	(Indonesia) Taufik Hidayat	25	21
11	(South Korea) Park Sung-hwan	23	19
5	(China) Chen Jin	21	16	24
10	(Malaysia) Wong Choong Hann	13	21	22

Final
6	(Indonesia) Taufik Hidayat	21	17	18
5	(China) Chen Jin	19	21	21

=== Top half ===
==== Section 1 ====
First Round
PFQ	(Philippines) M A Natividad	14	15
(Malaysia) Y Khrishnan	21	21
(Thailand) P Sapkulchananart	21	21
(Australia) J Tho	4	10
15	(Malaysia) R Hashim	21	21
(Vietnam) Nguyễn Q M	14	5
Q1	(Macau) Ip T F	13	8
(Indonesia) D H Rumbaka	21	21
6	(Indonesia) T Hidayat	21	21
(United States) E Go	15	13
(Chinese Taipei) Hsieh Y-h	w	/	o
(Malaysia) S A Ayob
12	(Hong Kong) Ng W	21	21
(South Korea) Lee C-h	12	7
(Malaysia) B Wong	21	21
Q7	(Macau) Mou C K	8	9

Second Round
(Malaysia) Y Khrishnan	19	11
(Thailand) P Sapkulchananart	21	21
15	(Malaysia) R Hashim	21	21
(Indonesia) D H Rumbaka	13	17
6	(Indonesia) T Hidayat	21	21
(Chinese Taipei) Hsieh Y-h	17	13
12	(Hong Kong) Ng W	21	21
(Malaysia) B Wong	16	9

Third Round
(Thailand) P Sapkulchananart	12	16
15	(Malaysia) R Hashim	21	21
6	(Indonesia) T Hidayat	23	21
12	(Hong Kong) Ng W	21	12

Quarter-finals
15	(Malaysia) R Hashim	18	16
6	(Indonesia) T Hidayat	21	21

==== Section 2 ====
First Round
PFQ	(Philippines) I Mendez	21	21
Q2	(Macau) Ng M C	6	13
(Indonesia) A K Tedjono	18	14
(Malaysia) Yeoh K B	21	21
11	(South Korea) Park S-h	21	21
Q8	(Macau) Leong K F	11	5
(Malaysia) L Daren	21	14	21
(Hong Kong) Hung Y W	17	21	11
PFQ	(Macau) Ho S U	5	4
(Vietnam) Dương P N	21	21
(Malaysia) Chong W F	15	15
(Indonesia) T Sugiarto	21	21
14	(England) A Smith	20	21	26
(Malaysia) M A Abdul Latif	22	11	24
(China) Gong WJ	21	21
(Hong Kong) Wong W H	16	13

Second Round
PFQ	(Philippines) I Mendez	5	14
(Malaysia) Yeoh K B	21	21
11	(South Korea) Park S-h	21	21
(Malaysia) L Daren	15	19
(Vietnam) Dương P N	11	13
(Indonesia) T Sugiarto	21	21
14	(England) A Smith	18	18
(China) Gong WJ	21	21

Third Round
(Malaysia) Yeoh K B	15	13
11	(South Korea) Park S-h	21	21
(Indonesia) T Sugiarto	12	17
(China) Gong WJ	21	21

Quarter-finals
11	(South Korea) Park S-h	21	18	21
(China) Gong WJ	11	21	11

=== Bottom half ===
==== Section 3 ====
First Round
(South Korea) Lee H-i	21	21
(Malaysia) V I Mawan	7	5
Q4	(Philippines) L Escoses	9	14
16	(Hong Kong) Chan Y K	21	21
(Thailand) T Saensomboonsuk	21	22
(Indonesia) A Y W Hartanto	10	20
(Chinese Taipei) Liao S-s	21	15	5
5	(China) Chen J	17	21	21
(Malaysia) K Lim	21	15	21
(Australia) S Gomez	14	21	14
(Indonesia) W H Putro	21	21
PFQ	(Malaysia) Lim F Y	13	16
Q5	(Macau) Lei T	9	8
(Malaysia) Tan C S	21	21
Q3	(Macau) Lei K	6	9
3	(China) Chen H	21	21

Second Round
(South Korea) Lee H-i	21	21
16	(Hong Kong) Chan Y K	14	15
(Thailand) T Saensomboonsuk	16	14
5	(China) Chen J	21	21
(Malaysia) K Lim	21	12	21
(Indonesia) W H Putro	12	21	12
(Malaysia) Tan C S	15	16
3	(China) Chen H	21	21

Third Round
(South Korea) Lee H-i	12	11
5	(China) Chen J	21	21
(Malaysia) K Lim	19	18
3	(China) Chen H	21	21

Quarter-finals
5	(China) Chen J	w	/	o
3	(China) Chen H

==== Section 4 ====
First Round
(Thailand) P Vilailak	21	21
(United States) R Rai	18	13
(Indonesia) A Yunus	14	20
10	(Malaysia) Wong C H	21	22
(Malaysia) Teo K S	13	21	21
(Philippines) K Asuncion	21	10	10
(Vietnam) Nguyễn T M	21	15	21
8	(Japan) S Satō	14	21	15
PFQ	(Chinese Taipei) Cheng C-h	w	/	o
(Malaysia) Pei W C
(South Korea) Hong J-h	21	21
PFQ	(Macau) Lam C M	11	10
(Malaysia) Chong L Q	21	21
(Hong Kong) Wong W K	17	11
(Indonesia) A Adityawarman	14	9
2	(China) Bao CL	21	21

Second Round
(Thailand) P Vilailak	21	19	7
10	(Malaysia) Wong C H	18	21	21
(Malaysia) Teo K S	20	7
(Vietnam) Nguyễn T M	22	21
PFQ	(Chinese Taipei) Cheng C-h	20	21	12
(South Korea) Hong J-h	22	13	21
(Malaysia) Chong L Q	16	14
2	(China) Bao CL	21	21

Third Round
10	(Malaysia) Wong C H	27	21
(Vietnam) Nguyễn T M	25	11
(South Korea) Hong J-h	17	11
2	(China) Bao CL	21	21

Quarter-finals
10	(Malaysia) Wong C H	18	21	21
2	(China) Bao CL	21	16	17

== Women's singles ==
=== Seeds ===
1. (China) Zhang Ning (withdrew)
2. (China) Xie Xingfang (champion)
3. (China) Zhu Lin (withdrew)
4. (Hong Kong) Wang Chen (withdrew)
5. (China) Lu Lan (semi-finals)
6. (Japan) Eriko Hirose (withdrew)
7. (Hong Kong) Yip Pui Yin (second round)
8. (Japan) Kaori Mori (first round)

=== Finals ===
Semi-finals
(South Korea) Jun Jae-youn	23	21
(Indonesia) Adriyanti Firdasari	21	10
5	(China) Lu Lan	16	12
2	(China) Xie Xingfang	21	21

Final
(South Korea) Jun Jae-youn	10	10
2	(China) Xie Xingfang	21	21

=== Top half ===
==== Section 1 ====
First Round
PFQ	(Indonesia) M F Kusumastuti	11	11
(India) S Newal	21	21
PFQ	(Indonesia) R Y Pungkasari	19	21	21
(Portugal) F Lamy	21	11	17
PFQ	(Indonesia) P Z Bernadeth	16	21	11
(Singapore) Li L	21	19	21
(Thailand) S Ponsana	11	11
(South Korea) Jun J-y	21	21

Second Round
(India) S Newal	21	21
PFQ	(Indonesia) R Y Pungkasari	10	12
(Singapore) Li L	16	21	18
(South Korea) Jun J-y	21	19	21

Quarter-finals
(India) S Newal	18	9
(South Korea) Jun J-y	21	21

==== Section 2 ====
First Round
PFQ	(Indonesia) M E Christina	7	17
(Indonesia) A Firdasari	21	21
Q1	(Chinese Taipei) Hung S-h	15	19
(Thailand) S Chansrisukot	21	21
7	(Hong Kong) Yip P Y	22	21
(Chinese Taipei) Pai M-j	20	9
(South Korea) Kim M-h	21	12	16
(Japan) K Yonekura	17	21	21

Second Round
(Indonesia) A Firdasari	21	21	21
(Thailand) S Chansrisukot	16	23	18
7	(Hong Kong) Yip P Y	17	15
(Japan) K Yonekura	21	21

Quarter-finals
(Indonesia) A Firdasari	21	21
(Japan) K Yonekura	17	15

=== Bottom half ===
==== Section 3 ====
First Round
(Spain) Y Martínez	15	7
(Thailand) M Meemeak	21	21
(Japan) Y Hirayama	20	9
5	(China) Lu L	22	21
(Chinese Taipei) Cheng S-c	21	21
Q2	(South Korea) Park S-r	19	12
(China) Wang L	12	21	21
PFQ	(Indonesia) F Ratnasari	21	10	8

Second Round
(Thailand) M Meemeak	12	11
(China) Lu L	21	21
(Chinese Taipei) Cheng S-c	11	11
(China) Wang L	21	21

Quarter-finals
(China) Lu L	21	21
(China) Wang L	19	8

==== Section 4 ====
First Round
(Hong Kong) Zhou M	21	21
Q3	(Thailand) P Buranaprasertsuk	15	11
(Singapore) Xing AY	20	21	26
8	(Japan) K Mori	22	12	24
Q4	(Indonesia) S Kurniawan	12	21	23
(South Korea) Jang S-y	21	17	21
(Malaysia) J Wong P X	14	13
2	(China) Xie XF	21	21

Second Round
(Hong Kong) Zhou M	21	21
(Singapore) Xing AY	10	4
Q4	(Indonesia) S Kurniawan	11	6
2	(China) Xie XF	21	21

Quarter-finals
(Hong Kong) Zhou M	13	13
2	(China) Xie XF	21	21

== Men's doubles ==
=== Seeds ===
1. (China) Cai Yun / Fu Haifeng (semi-finals)
2. (Malaysia) Koo Kien Keat / Tan Boon Heong (champions)
3. (Indonesia) Markis Kido / Hendra Setiawan (semi-finals)
4. (Malaysia) Choong Tan Fook / Lee Wan Wah (final)
5. (South Korea) Jung Jae-sung / Lee Yong-dae (quarter-finals)
6. (Indonesia) Luluk Hadiyanto / Alvent Yulianto (first round)
7. (South Korea) Hwang Ji-man / Lee Jae-jin (quarter-finals)
8. (Japan) Shintaro Ikeda / Shuichi Sakamoto (first round)

=== Finals ===
Semi-finals
1	(China) Cai Yun (China) Fu Haifeng	20	18
4	(Malaysia) Choong Tan Fook (Malaysia) Lee Wan Wah	22	21
3	(Indonesia) Markis Kido (Indonesia) Hendra Setiawan	18	11
2	(Malaysia) Koo Kien Keat (Malaysia) Tan Boon Heong	21	21

Final
4	(Malaysia) Choong Tan Fook (Malaysia) Lee Wan Wah	18	21	21
2	(Malaysia) Koo Kien Keat (Malaysia) Tan Boon Heong	21	17	23

=== Top half ===
==== Section 1 ====
First Round
1	(China) Cai Y (China) Fu HF	21	21
(Hong Kong) A S Njoto (Hong Kong) Y H Wiratama	14	15
(Australia) G Warfe (Australia) R Smith	8	21	17
(Chinese Taipei) Fang C-m (Chinese Taipei) Lee S-m	21	15	21
7	(South Korea) Hwang J-m (South Korea) Lee J-j	16	21	21
(Japan) K Masuda (Japan) T Ōtsuka	21	12	15
(Indonesia) H A Gunawan (Indonesia) J Riyadi	21	21
SUB	(Malaysia) Hoon T H (Malaysia) Tan B S	10	15

Second Round
1	(China) Cai Y (China) Fu HF	21	21
(Chinese Taipei) Fang C-m (Chinese Taipei) Lee S-m	18	12
7	(South Korea) Hwang J-m (South Korea) Lee J-j	20	21	21
(Indonesia) H A Gunawan (Indonesia) J Riyadi	22	13	9

Quarter-finals
1	(China) Cai Y (China) Fu HF	21	21
7	(South Korea) Hwang J-m (South Korea) Lee J-j	14	14

==== Section 2 ====
First Round
4	(Malaysia) Choong T F (Malaysia) Lee W W	21	21
(Indonesia) M Ahsan (Indonesia) B Septano	12	11
(Chinese Taipei) Hu C-h (Chinese Taipei) Tsai C-h	17	21	22
Q2	(Chinese Taipei) Chen H-l (Chinese Taipei) Lin Y-j	21	12	20
6	(Indonesia) L Hadiyanto (Indonesia) A Yulianto	21	16	16
(Malaysia) M R Abdul Latif (Malaysia) Khoo C C	14	21	21
(Thailand) S Jantharasom (Thailand) W Bunwiroon	11	12
Q4	(Thailand) N Nuttaphon (Thailand) P Chalardchaleam	21	21

Second Round
4	(Malaysia) Choong T F (Malaysia) Lee W W	21	19	21
(Chinese Taipei) Hu C-h (Chinese Taipei) Tsai C-h	14	21	14
(Malaysia) M R Abdul Latif (Malaysia) Khoo C C	12	21	21
Q4	(Thailand) N Nuttaphon (Thailand) P Chalardchaleam	21	11	13

Quarter-finals
4	(Malaysia) Choong T F (Malaysia) Lee W W	21	21
(Malaysia) M R Abdul Latif (Malaysia) Khoo C C	11	16

=== Bottom half ===
==== Section 3 ====
First Round
(Indonesia) F Kurniawan (Indonesia) R Wijaya	18	16
(Malaysia) Gan T C (Malaysia) R Lin W F	21	21
(Singapore) H Saputra (Singapore) H Wijaya	22	21
8	(Japan) S Ikeda (Japan) S Sakamoto	20	17
(Malaysia) Lim K W (Malaysia) Mak H C	12	16
(Chinese Taipei) Chien Y-h (Chinese Taipei) Lin Y-l	21	21
Q3	(Vietnam) Nguyễn Q M (Vietnam) Trần T H	25	13
3	(Indonesia) M Kido (Indonesia) H Setiawan	21	21

Second Round
(Malaysia) Gan T C (Malaysia) R Lin W F	19	24	22
(Singapore) H Saputra (Singapore) H Wijaya	21	22	20
(Chinese Taipei) Chien Y-h (Chinese Taipei) Lin Y-l	13	21
3	(Indonesia) M Kido (Indonesia) H Setiawan	21	23

Quarter-finals
(Malaysia) Gan T C (Malaysia) R Lin W F	21	9	21
3	(Indonesia) M Kido (Indonesia) H Setiawan	16	21	23

==== Section 4 ====
First Round
(China) Guo ZD (China) Xie ZB	21	21
(Indonesia) R Sukmawan (Indonesia) Y S Dasuki	14	14
(Malaysia) Chew C E (Malaysia) Hong C H	14	15
5	(South Korea) Jung J-s (South Korea) Lee Y-d	21	21
Q1	(Malaysia) Chan P S (Malaysia) Chang H P	17	17
(Hong Kong) Hui W H (Hong Kong) A T Putra	21	21
(Japan) K Kawaguchi (Japan) N Kawamae	12	6
2	(Malaysia) Koo K K (Malaysia) Tan B H	21	21

Second Round
(China) Guo ZD (China) Xie ZB	14	18
5	(South Korea) Jung J-s (South Korea) Lee Y-d	21	21
(Hong Kong) Hui W H (Hong Kong) A T Putra	18	9
2	(Malaysia) Koo K K (Malaysia) Tan B H	21	21

Quarter-finals
5	(South Korea) Jung J-s (South Korea) Lee Y-d	13	14
2	(Malaysia) Koo K K (Malaysia) Tan B H	21	21

== Women's doubles ==
=== Seeds ===
1. (China) Wei Yili / Zhang Yawen (quarter-finals)
2. (China) Gao Ling / Huang Sui (champions)
3. (Chinese Taipei) Cheng Wen-hsing / Chien Yu-chin (semi-finals)
4. (Singapore) Jiang Yanmei / Li Yujia (semi-finals)
5. (China) Yu Yang / Zhao Tingting (withdrew)
6. (South Korea) Lee Hyo-jung / Lee Kyung-won (final)
7. (Japan) Aki Akao / Tomomi Matsuda (second round)
8. (Japan) Miyuki Maeda / Satoko Suetsuna (quarter-finals)

=== Finals ===
Semi-finals
6	(South Korea) Lee Hyo-jung (South Korea) Lee Kyung-won	21	21
4	(Singapore) Jiang Yanmei (Singapore) Li Yujia	12	11
3	(Chinese Taipei) Cheng Wen-hsing (Chinese Taipei) Chien Yu-chin	21	13	16
2	(China) Gao Ling (China) Huang Sui	18	21	21

Final
6	(South Korea) Lee Hyo-jung (South Korea) Lee Kyung-won	15	7
2	(China) Gao Ling (China) Huang Sui	21	21

=== Top half ===
==== Section 1 ====
First Round
1	(China) Wei YL (China) Zhang YW	21	21
(Chinese Taipei) Chou C-c (Chinese Taipei) Ku P-t	15	10
(Chinese Taipei) Hsieh P-c (Chinese Taipei) Lee T-a	21	21
(Macau) Iao M H (Macau) Mou C L	4	6
6	(South Korea) Lee H-j (South Korea) Lee K-w	21	21
(Macau) Lei S C (Macau) Pun U W	3	8
(Hong Kong) Wong M C (Hong Kong) Lam S Y	18	21	13
(Chinese Taipei) Tsai P-l (Chinese Taipei) Yang C-c	21	7	21

Second Round
1	(China) Wei YL (China) Zhang YW	21	21
(Chinese Taipei) Hsieh P-c (Chinese Taipei) Lee T-a	11	7
6	(South Korea) Lee H-j (South Korea) Lee K-w	21	21
(Chinese Taipei) Tsai P-l (Chinese Taipei) Yang C-c	5	14

Quarter-finals
1	(China) Wei YL (China) Zhang YW	21	10	15
6	(South Korea) Lee H-j (South Korea) Lee K-w	11	21	21

==== Section 2 ====
First Round
4	(Singapore) Jiang YM (Singapore) Li YJ	21	21
(Hong Kong) Chan T K (Hong Kong) Tse Y S	13	8
Q1	(Macau) Fong S C (Macau) A E de Assis	8	7
(Hong Kong) Mong K Y (Hong Kong) Ng K S	21	21
8	(Japan) M Maeda (Japan) S Suetsuna	21	21
(Chinese Taipei) Chang L-y (Chinese Taipei) Hung S-c	8	17
(Malaysia) Goh L Y (Malaysia) Ng H L	21	21
PFQ	(Macau) Lao I K (Macau) J Lee W K	10	14

Second Round
4	(Singapore) Jiang YM (Singapore) Li YJ	21	21
(Hong Kong) Mong K Y (Hong Kong) Ng K S	8	6
8	(Japan) M Maeda (Japan) S Suetsuna	16	21	21
(Malaysia) Goh L Y (Malaysia) Ng H L	21	12	9

Quarter-finals
4	(Singapore) Jiang YM (Singapore) Li YJ	21	19	21
8	(Japan) M Maeda (Japan) S Suetsuna	18	21	16

=== Bottom half ===
==== Section 3 ====
First Round
(United States) P Phongasavithas (United States) V Phongasavithas	19	18
(Macau) Long Y (Macau) Mak K L	21	21
(Malaysia) Chon S C (Malaysia) A A Anscelly	w	/	o
5	(China) Yu Y (China) Zhao TT
(Hong Kong) Chau H W (Hong Kong) Koon W C	w	/	o
(Singapore) Li L (Singapore) Xing AY
(Indonesia) N K Maheswari (Indonesia) L Nurlita	14	11
3	(Chinese Taipei) Cheng W-h (Chinese Taipei) Chien Y-c	21	21

Second Round
(Macau) Long Y (Macau) Mak K L	21	12
(Malaysia) Chon S C (Malaysia) A A Anscelly	23	21
(Hong Kong) Chau H W (Hong Kong) Koon W C	16	12
3	(Chinese Taipei) Cheng W-h (Chinese Taipei) Chien Y-c	21	21

Quarter-finals
(Malaysia) Chon S C (Malaysia) A A Anscelly	13	9
3	(Chinese Taipei) Cheng W-h (Chinese Taipei) Chien Y-c	21	21

==== Section 4 ====
First Round
(Hong Kong) Fung Y (Hong Kong) Wong S Y	6	7
(South Korea) Ha J-e (South Korea) Kim M-j	21	21
(Hong Kong) Chan H Y (Hong Kong) Yeung N T	8	15
7	(Japan) A Akao (Japan) T Matsuda	21	21
(Japan) I Tatani (Japan) A Wakisaka	21	21
(Malaysia) L Cheah (Malaysia) Tee J Y	10	17
(Indonesia) V Marissa (Indonesia) L Natsir
2	(China) Gao L (China) Huang S	w	/	o

Second Round
(South Korea) Ha J-e (South Korea) Kim M-j	21	21
7	(Japan) A Akao (Japan) T Matsuda	18	14
(Japan) I Tatani (Japan) A Wakisaka	8	8
2	(China) Gao L (China) Huang S	21	21

Quarter-finals
(South Korea) Ha J-e (South Korea) Kim M-j	12	16
2	(China) Gao L (China) Huang S	21	21

== Mixed doubles ==
=== Seeds ===
1. (China) Xie Zhongbo / Zhang Yawen (champions)
2. (Singapore) Hendri Saputra / Li Yujia (quarter-finals)
3. (Japan) Keita Masuda / Miyuki Maeda (first round)
4. (Singapore) Hendra Wijaya / Jiang Yanmei (first round)
5. (China) Zheng Bo / Yu Yang (withdrew)
6. (Indonesia) Nova Widianto / Vita Marissa (withdrew)
7. (Indonesia) Muhammad Rijal / Liliyana Natsir (withdrew)
8. (South Korea) Han Sang-hoon / Lee Hyo-jung (semi-finals)

=== Finals ===
Semi-finals
1	(China) Xie Zhongbo (China) Zhang Yawen	21	17	21
8	(South Korea) Han Sang-hoon (South Korea) Lee Hyo-jung	11	21	12
(Chinese Taipei) Chen Hung-ling (Chinese Taipei) Chou Chia-chi	16	21	16
(Chinese Taipei) Fang Chieh-min (Chinese Taipei) Cheng Wen-hsing	21	11	21

Final
1	(China) Xie Zhongbo (China) Zhang Yawen	21	21
(Chinese Taipei) Fang Chieh-min (Chinese Taipei) Cheng Wen-hsing	14	16

=== Top half ===
==== Section 1 ====
First Round
1	(China) Xie ZB (China) Zhang YW	22	21
(South Korea) Lee Y-d (South Korea) Ha J-e	20	15
(Hong Kong) Lo L K (Hong Kong) Ng K S	15	10
(Malaysia) M R Abdul Latif (Malaysia) Chong S C	21	21
PFQ	(Macau) Lei K (Macau) J Lee W K	3	8
(South Korea) Lee J-j (South Korea) Hwang Y-m	21	21
(Japan) T Ōtsuka (Japan) S Suetsuna	21	19	17
(Chinese Taipei) Tsai C-h (Chinese Taipei) Cheng S-c	13	21	21

Second Round
1	(China) Xie ZB (China) Zhang YW	21	21
(Malaysia) M R Abdul Latif (Malaysia) Chong S C	9	16
(South Korea) Lee J-j (South Korea) Hwang Y-m	21	15	21
(Chinese Taipei) Tsai C-h (Chinese Taipei) Cheng S-c	14	21	18

Quarter-finals
1	(China) Xie ZB (China) Zhang YW	21	21
(South Korea) Lee J-j (South Korea) Hwang Y-m	16	14

==== Section 2 ====
First Round
4	(Singapore) H Wijaya (Singapore) Jiang YM	16	18
(Indonesia) D L Fitriawan (Indonesia) L Nurlita	21	21
(Malaysia) Tan W K (Malaysia) Woon K W	19	19
(Philippines) Kennevic Asuncion (Philippines) Kennie Asuncion	21	21
8	(South Korea) Han S-h (South Korea) Lee H-j	21	21
Q2	(United States) H Haryanto (United States) P Phongasavithas	10	9
(Chinese Taipei) Hsieh Y-h (Chinese Taipei) Chien Y-c	21	21
(Hong Kong) Hui W H (Hong Kong) Wong M C	12	15

Second Round
(Indonesia) D L Fitriawan (Indonesia) L Nurlita	24	19	21
(Philippines) Kennevic Asuncion (Philippines) Kennie Asuncion	22	21	16
8	(South Korea) Han S-h (South Korea) Lee H-j	21	19	21
(Chinese Taipei) Hsieh Y-h (Chinese Taipei) Chien Y-c	14	21	14

Quarter-finals
(Indonesia) D L Fitriawan (Indonesia) L Nurlita	9	17
8	(South Korea) Han S-h (South Korea) Lee H-j	21	21

=== Bottom half ===
==== Section 3 ====
First Round
(Chinese Taipei) Chen H-l (Chinese Taipei) Chou C-c	21	19	21
(Malaysia) Lim K W (Malaysia) Ng H L	19	21	18
Q1	(Chinese Taipei) Lin Y-l (Chinese Taipei) Hsieh P-c	21	21
PFQ	(Malaysia) Ip T F (Macau) Lao I K	9	13
Q3	(Hong Kong) Lau C Y (Hong Kong) Yung H Y	11	12
(Hong Kong) Koon L C (Hong Kong) A T Putra	21	21
PFQ	(Hong Kong) Y H Wiratama (Hong Kong) Chau H W	21	21
3	(Japan) K Masuda (Japan) M Maeda	19	16

Second Round
(Chinese Taipei) Chen H-l (Chinese Taipei) Chou C-c	21	21
(Chinese Taipei) Lin Y-l (Chinese Taipei) Hsieh P-c	14	16
(Hong Kong) Koon L C (Hong Kong) A T Putra	21	21	23
PFQ	(Hong Kong) Y H Wiratama (Hong Kong) Chau H W	19	23	25

Quarter-finals
(Chinese Taipei) Chen H-l (Chinese Taipei) Chou C-c	22	21
PFQ	(Hong Kong) Y H Wiratama (Hong Kong) Chau H W	20	15

==== Section 4 ====
First Round
(Chinese Taipei) Fang C-m (Chinese Taipei) Cheng W-h	21	22
(Indonesia) L Lie (Indonesia) N K Maheswari	11	20
Q4	(Chinese Taipei) Lee T-a (Chinese Taipei) Lin Y-j	14	21	21
PFQ	(Malaysia) M L Z Abdul Khalid (Malaysia) Goh L Y	21	17	17
(Hong Kong) Lam S Y (Hong Kong) Leung C Y	9	11
(South Korea) Hwang J-m (South Korea) Lee K-w	21	21
(Malaysia) Chan P S (Malaysia) A A Anscelly	15	12
2	(Singapore) H Saputra (Singapore) Li YJ	21	21

Second Round
(Chinese Taipei) Fang C-m (Chinese Taipei) Cheng W-h	21	21
Q4	(Chinese Taipei) Lee T-a (Chinese Taipei) Lin Y-j	13	16
(South Korea) Hwang J-m (South Korea) Lee K-w	16	21	11
2	(Singapore) H Saputra (Singapore) Li YJ	21	13	21

Quarter-finals
(Chinese Taipei) Fang C-m (Chinese Taipei) Cheng W-h	21	16	21
2	(Singapore) H Saputra (Singapore) Li YJ	8	21	15

Preceded by 2007 Chinese Taipei Open Grand Prix Gold	BWF Grand Prix Gold and Grand Prix; 2007 season	Succeeded by 2007 Bitburger Open Grand Prix
