= 2007 BWF Grand Prix Gold and Grand Prix =

The 2007 BWF Grand Prix Gold and Grand Prix was the inaugural season of BWF Grand Prix Gold and Grand Prix under the new tournament structure introduced by Badminton World Federation (BWF). It was held from February 28 and ended on December 12, 2007. 12 events were planned, but India Open Grand Prix Gold was cancelled following the bomb blast in the city. The organizers decided to postpone the tournament to indefinite date. However, the President of Badminton Association of India said the tournament is likely to take place from January 7 to January 13, 2008. But BWF later confirmed the event was cancelled. Had the tournament been held, it would have been held in Kotla Vijay Bhaskar Reddy Indoor Stadium, Hyderabad from 4–9 September 2007.

== Schedule ==
Below is the schedule released by Badminton World Federation:

Tour	Official title	Venue	City	Date		Prize money USD	Report
Tour	Official title	Venue	City	Start	Finish	Prize money USD	Report
1	(Germany) German Open Grand Prix	RWE-Sporthalle	Mülheim	February 27	March 4	80,000	Report
2	New Zealand Open Grand Prix	Auckland Badminton Hall	Auckland	May 15	May 20	50,000	Report
3	Thailand Open Grand Prix Gold	Nimibutr Stadium	Bangkok	July 3	July 8	120,000	Report
4	Philippines Open Grand Prix Gold	PhilSports Complex	Manila	July 17	July 22	120,000	Report
5	(United States) U.S. Open Grand Prix	Orange County Badminton Club	Orange	August 27	September 1	50,000	Report
6	Chinese Taipei Open Grand Prix Gold	Taipei County Shinjuang Stadium	Taipei	September 18	September 23	170,000	Report
7	Macau Open Grand Prix Gold	Macau Polytechnic Institute Multisport Pavilion	Macau	October 2	October 7	120,000	Report
8	(Germany) Bitburger Open Grand Prix	Saarlandhalle Saarbrücken	Saarbrücken	October 2	October 7	70,000	Report
9	(Netherlands) Dutch Open Grand Prix	Topsportcentrum	Almere	October 16	October 21	50,000	Report
10	Vietnam Open Grand Prix	Quan Ngua Sports Palace	Hanoi	November 6	November 11	50,000	Report
11	(Russia) Russian Open Grand Prix Gold	CSKA Universal Sports Hall	Moscow	December 5	December 9	125,000	Report

Grand Prix Gold

== Results ==
=== Winners ===
Tour	Men's singles	Women's singles	Men's doubles	Women's doubles	Mixed doubles
Germany	(China) Lin Dan	(China) Xie Xingfang	(South Korea) Hwang Ji-man (South Korea) Lee Jae-jin	(China) Yang Wei (China) Zhang Jiewen	(China) Zheng Bo (China) Gao Ling
New Zealand	(Indonesia) Andre Kurniawan Tedjono	(Hong Kong) Zhou Mi	(Malaysia) Chan Chong Ming (Malaysia) Hoon Thien How	(Japan) Ikue Tatani (Japan) Aya Wakisaka	(Indonesia) Devin Lahardi Fitriawan (Indonesia) Lita Nurlita
Thailand	(China) Chen Hong	(China) Zhu Lin	(South Korea) Hwang Ji-man (South Korea) Lee Jae-jin	(China) Gao Ling (China) Huang Sui	(China) He Hanbin (China) Yu Yang
Philippines	(Malaysia) Lee Chong Wei	(Hong Kong) Zhou Mi	(Malaysia) Koo Kien Keat (Malaysia) Tan Boon Heong	(Chinese Taipei) Cheng Wen-hsing (Chinese Taipei) Chien Yu-chin	(Indonesia) Nova Widianto (Indonesia) Liliyana Natsir
United States	(Malaysia) Lee Tsuen Seng	(South Korea) Jun Jae-youn	(Japan) Keita Masuda (Japan) Tadashi Ōtsuka	(Japan) Miyuki Maeda (Japan) Satoko Suetsuna	(Japan) Keita Masuda (Japan) Miyuki Maeda
Chinese Taipei	(Indonesia) Sony Dwi Kuncoro	(Hong Kong) Wang Chen	(Indonesia) Markis Kido (Indonesia) Hendra Setiawan	(Chinese Taipei) Cheng Wen-hsing (Chinese Taipei) Chien Yu-chin	(Indonesia) Flandy Limpele (Indonesia) Vita Marissa
Macau	(China) Chen Jin	(China) Xie Xingfang	(Malaysia) Koo Kien Keat (Malaysia) Tan Boon Heong	(China) Gao Ling (China) Huang Sui	(China) Xie Zhongbo (China) Zhang Yawen
(Germany) Bitburger	(China) Lü Yi	(China) Wang Yihan	(Denmark) Mathias Boe (Denmark) Carsten Mogensen	(China) Yang Wei (China) Zhang Jiewen	(Germany) Kristof Hopp (Germany) Birgit Overzier
Netherlands	(Singapore) Kendrick Lee Yen Hui	(China) Li Wenyan	(Indonesia) Yonatan Suryatama Dasuki (Indonesia) Rian Sukmawan	(Russia) Ekaterina Ananina (Russia) Anastasia Russkikh	(Denmark) Rasmus Bonde Nissen (Denmark) Christinna Pedersen
Vietnam	(Malaysia) Roslin Hashim	(China) Zhu Jingjing	(South Korea) Ko Sung-hyun (South Korea) Kwon Yi-goo	(Indonesia) Natalia Christine Poluakan (Indonesia) Yulianti	(Indonesia) Tontowi Ahmad (Indonesia) Yulianti
Russia	(China) Lü Yi	(China) Wang Yihan	(Germany) Kristof Hopp (Germany) Ingo Kindervater	(China) Du Jing (China) Yu Yang	(Poland) Robert Mateusiak (Poland) Nadieżda Kostiuczyk

=== Performance by countries ===
Tabulated below are the Grand Prix performances based on countries. Only countries who have won a title are listed:

Rank	Team	Grand Prix Gold					Grand Prix						Total
Rank	Team	THA	PHI	TPE	MAC	RUS	GER	NZL	USA	GER	NED	VIE	Total
1	China	4			4	3	4			3	1	1	20
2	Indonesia		1	3				2			1	2	9
3	Malaysia		2		1			1	1			1	6
4	South Korea	1					1		1			1	4
5	Japan							1	3				4
6	Hong Kong		1	1				1					3
7	Chinese Taipei		1	1									2
8	Russia					1				1			2
9	Denmark									1	1		2
10	Poland					1							1
11	Russia										1		1
11	Singapore										1		1

== Grand Prix Gold ==
Thailand Open

- July 3—July 8, Nimibutr Stadium, Bangkok, Thailand.

Category	Winners	Runners-up	Score
Men's singles	(China) Chen Hong	(Thailand) Boonsak Ponsana	21–14, 11–21, 23–21
Women's singles	(China) Zhu Lin	(Hong Kong) Zhou Mi	20–22, 21–5, 21–4
Men's doubles	(South Korea) Lee Jae-jin / Hwang Ji-man	(South Korea) Jung Jae-sung / Lee Yong-dae	21–19, 19–21, 21–9
Mixed doubles	(China) Gao Ling / Huang Sui	(China) Du Jing / Yu Yang	walkover
Women's doubles	(China) He Hanbin / Yu Yang	(South Korea) Han Sang-hoon / Hwang Yu-mi	21–12, 21–14
Main article: 2007 Thailand Open Grand Prix Gold

Philippines Open

- July 17—22, PhilSports Arena, Pasig, Philippines.

Category	Winners	Runners-up	Score
Men's singles	(Malaysia) Lee Chong Wei	(China) Chen Hong	21–9, 21–15
Women's singles	(Hong Kong) Zhou Mi	(China) Zhu Jingjing	21–18, 21–12
Men's doubles	(Malaysia) Koo Kien Keat / Tan Boon Heong	(China) Guo Zhendong / Xie Zhongbo	21–8, 26–24
Women's doubles	(Chinese Taipei) Chien Yu-chin / Cheng Wen-hsing	(China) Pan Pan / Tian Qing	22–20, 21–14
Mixed doubles	(Indonesia) Nova Widianto / Liliyana Natsir	(South Korea) Han Sang-hoon / Hwang Yu-mi	21–17, 21–13
Main article: 2007 Philippines Open Grand Prix Gold

Chinese Taipei Open

- September 18—September 23, Taipei County Shinjuang Stadium, Hsinchuang City, Taipei, Taiwan.

Category	Winners	Runners-up	Score
Men's singles	(Indonesia) Sony Dwi Kuncoro	(Indonesia) Taufik Hidayat	18–21, 21–6, 21–13
Women's singles	(Hong Kong) Wang Chen	(France) Pi Hongyan	21–18, 14–21, 26–24
Men's doubles	(Indonesia) Markis Kido / Hendra Setiawan	(Denmark) Lars Paaske / Jonas Rasmussen	21–17, 21–12
Women's doubles	(Chinese Taipei) Chien Yu-chin / Cheng Wen-hsing	(Indonesia) Liliyana Natsir / Vita Marissa	21–15, 17–21, 21–18
Mixed doubles	(Indonesia) Flandy Limpele / Vita Marissa	(Denmark) Thomas Laybourn / Kamilla Rytter Juhl	21–18, 25–23
Main article: 2007 Chinese Taipei Open Grand Prix Gold

Macau Open

- October 2—October 7, Macau Polytechnic Institute Multisport Pavilion, Macau.

Category	Winners	Runners-up	Score
Men's singles	(China) Chen Jin	(Indonesia) Taufik Hidayat	19–21, 21–17, 21–18
Women's singles	(China) Xie Xingfang	(South Korea) Jun Jae-youn	21–10, 21–10
Men's doubles	(Malaysia) Koo Kien Keat / Tan Boon Heong	(Malaysia) Choong Tan Fook / Lee Wan Wah	21–18, 17–21, 23–21
Women's doubles	(China) Gao Ling / Huang Sui	(South Korea) Lee Kyung-won / Lee Hyo-jung	21–15, 21–7
Mixed doubles	(China) Xie Zhongbo / Zhang Yawen	(Chinese Taipei) Fang Chieh-min / Cheng Wen-hsing	21–14, 21–16
Main article: 2007 Macau Open Grand Prix Gold

Russian Open

- December 5—December 9, CSKA Universal Sports Hall, Moscow, Russia.

Category	Winners	Runners-up	Score
Men's singles	(China) Lü Yi	(Indonesia) Andre Kurniawan Tedjono	21–19, 11–21, 21–10
Women's singles	(China) Wang Yihan	(Germany) Xu Huaiwen	21–17, 16–21, 21–19
Men's doubles	(Germany) Kristof Hopp / Ingo Kindervater	(Japan) Shuichi Sakamato / Shintaro Ikeda	21–16, 22–20
Women's doubles	(China) Du Jing / Yu Yang	(Chinese Taipei) Chien Yu-chin / Cheng Wen-hsing	21–14, 21–14
Mixed doubles	(Poland) Nadieżda Kostiuczyk / Robert Mateusiak	(China) Yu Yang / He Hanbin	25–23, 13–21, 21–13
Main article: 2007 Russian Open Grand Prix Gold

== Grand Prix ==
German Open

- February 27—March 4, RWE Rhein-Ruhr Sporthalle, Mülheim, Germany.

Category	Winners	Runners-up	Score
Men's singles	(China) Lin Dan	(China) Chen Yu	walkover
Women's singles	(China) Xie Xingfang	(Germany) Xu Huaiwen	19–21, 21–12, 21–19
Men's doubles	(South Korea) Lee Jae-jin / Hwang Ji-man	(South Korea) Jung Jae-sung / Lee Yong-dae	21–18, 22–20
Women's doubles	(China) Yang Wei / Zhang Jiewen	(China) Du Jing / Yu Yang	21–8, 21–7
Mixed doubles	(China) Zheng Bo / Gao Ling	(China) Xu Chen / Zhao Tingting	21–11, 21–10
Main article: 2007 German Open Grand Prix

New Zealand Open

- May 15—May 20, Auckland Badminton Hall, Auckland, New Zealand.

Category	Winners	Runners-up	Score
Men's singles	(Indonesia) Andre Kurniawan Tedjono	(Malaysia) Wong Choong Hann	13–21, 21–18, 21–14
Women's singles	(Hong Kong) Zhou Mi	(Japan) Chie Umezu	21–13, 21–10
Men's doubles	(Malaysia) Chan Chong Ming / Hoon Thien How	(Hong Kong) Albertus Susanto Njoto / Yohan Hadikusumo Wiratama	21–14, 20–22, 21–11
Women's doubles	(Japan) Ikue Tatani / Aya Wakisaka	(Indonesia) Meiliana Jauhari / Shendy Puspa Irawati	21–17, 15–21, 21–16
Mixed doubles	(Indonesia) Devin Lahardi Fitriawan / Lita Nurlita	(Indonesia) Anggun Nugroho / Nitya Krishinda Maheswari	21–16, 21–15
Main article: 2007 New Zealand Open Grand Prix

U.S. Open

- August 27—September 1, Orange County Badminton Club, Orange, California, United States.

Category	Winners	Runners-up	Score
Men's singles	(Malaysia) Lee Tsuen Seng	(Japan) Yousuke Nakanishi	21–14, 21–10
Women's singles	(South Korea) Jun Jae-youn	(South Korea) Lee Yun-hwa	21–18, 21–16
Men's doubles	(Japan) Tadashi Ohtsuka / Keita Masuda	(United States) Howard Bach / Khan Malaythong	21–18, 21–11
Women's doubles	(Japan) Miyuki Maeda / Satoko Suetsuna	(Japan) Aki Akao / Tomomi Matsuda	16–21, 21–14, 21–15
Mixed doubles	(Japan) Keita Masuda / Miyuki Maeda	(United States) Howard Bach / Eva Lee	19–21, 21–11, 21–19
Main article: 2007 U.S. Open Grand Prix

Bitburger Open

- October 2—October 7, Saarlandhalle, Saarbrücken, Germany.

Category	Winners	Runners-up	Score
Men's singles	(China) Lü Yi	(Malaysia) Lee Tsuen Seng	23–21, 19–21, 21–15
Women's singles	(China) Wang Yihan	(Germany) Juliane Schenk	16–21, 21–10, 21–17
Men's doubles	(Denmark) Mathias Boe / Carsten Mogensen	(England) Robert Blair / David Lindley	21–17, 21–15
Women's doubles	(China) Yang Wei / Zhang Jiewen	(England) Joanne Nicholas / Natalie Munt	21–11, 21–10
Mixed doubles	(Germany) Kristof Hopp / Birgit Overzier	(England) Robert Blair / (Scotland) Imogen Bankier	21–17, 21–17
Main article: 2007 Bitburger Open Grand Prix

Dutch Open

- October 16—October 21, Topsportcentrum Almere, Almere, Netherlands.

Category	Winners	Runners-up	Score
Men's singles	(Singapore) Lee Yen Hui Kendrick	(Poland) Przemysław Wacha	20–22, 21–11, 21–18
Women's singles	(China) Li Wenyan	(Netherlands) Judith Meulendijks	21–18, 21–19
Men's doubles	(Indonesia) Rian Sukmawan / Yonatan Suryatama Dasuki	(Indonesia) Rendra Wijaya / Fran Kurniawan	21–13, 21–12
Women's doubles	(Russia) Anastasia Russkikh / Ekaterina Ananina	(Russia) Nina Vislova / Valeria Sorokina	20–22, 21–15, 21–13
Mixed doubles	(Denmark) Rasmus Bonde Nissen / Christinna Pedersen	(Singapore) Hendri Kurniawan Saputra / Li Yujia	21–16, 21–14
Main article: 2007 Dutch Open Grand Prix

Vietnam Open

- November 6—November 11, Quan Ngua Sports Palace, Hanoi, Vietnam.

Category	Winners	Runners-up	Score
Men's singles	(Malaysia) Roslin Hashim	(Indonesia) Andre Kurniawan Tedjono	21–12, 23–21
Women's singles	(China) Zhu Jingjing	(Japan) Yu Hirayama	21–10, 21–10
Men's doubles	(South Korea) Kwon Yi-goo / Ko Sung-hyun	(South Korea) Kang Myeong-won / Cho Gun-woo	21–17, 21–12
Women's doubles	(Indonesia) Nathalia Christine Poluakan / Yulianti Cj	(Hong Kong) Chau Hoi Wah / Louisa Koon Wai Chee	21–19, 21–15
Mixed doubles	(Indonesia) Yulianti Cj / Tontowi Ahmad	(Hong Kong) Chau Hoi Wah / Hui Wai Ho	21–11, 21–13
Main article: 2007 Vietnam Open Grand Prix
