= Anita Raj Kaur =

Malaysian badminton player (born 1986)

Personal information
- Born: Anita Raj Kaur d/o Mohinder Singh; 31 July 1986 (age 40) Selangor Darul Ehsan, Malaysia

Sport
- Country: Malaysia
- Sport: Badminton

Women's singles & doubles
- Highest ranking: 41 (WS 04 September 2007); 60 (WD 20 June 2006); 81 (XD 15 September 2009)
- BWF profile
Medal record
Women's badminton
Representing Malaysia
Southeast Asian Games
Bronze medal – third place	2007 Nakhon Ratchasima	Women's team

Anita Raj Kaur d/o Mohinder Singh (Punjabi: ਅਨੀਤਾ ਰਾਜ ਕੌਰ, romanized: Anītā rāja kaura; born 31 July 1986) is a Malaysian badminton player. In 2004, she became the first non-Chinese player to win the National Championships title. In 2009, Kaur won the women's singles title at the Croatian International tournament, and in 2010, she won double title at the Welsh International in the women's singles and doubles events.

== Personal life ==
She is the Indian descent with distant relatives in Chandigarh. Kaur is a daughter of Mohinder Singh and Jasmal Kaur, and her sister Ravinder Kaur also represented Malaysia in badminton tournaments.

== Achievements ==
=== IBF Grand Prix ===
The World Badminton Grand Prix sanctioned by International Badminton Federation (IBF) from 1983 to 2006.

Women's singles
Year	Tournament	Opponent	Score	Result
2006	Vietnam Open	(South Korea) Bae Seung-hee	8–21, 18–21	(silver) Runner-up

=== BWF International Challenge/Series ===
Women's singles
Year	Tournament	Opponent	Score	Result
2006	Sri Lanka Satellite	(Malaysia) Julia Wong Pei Xian	14–21, 21–16, 19–21	(silver) Runner-up
2006	Malaysia Satellite	(Malaysia) Sutheaswari Mudukasan	15–21, 13–21	(silver) Runner-up
2009	Swedish International	(Japan) Yu Hirayama	19–21, 21–15, 18–21	(silver) Runner-up
2009	Croatian International	(Russia) Tatjana Bibik	19–21, 21–12, 21–12	(gold) Winner
2009	Welsh International	(Russia) Tatjana Bibik	19–21, 21–15, 18–21	(silver) Runner-up
2010	Iceland International	(Iceland) Ragna Ingólfsdóttir	17–21, 18–21	(silver) Runner-up
2010	Welsh International	(Indonesia) Atu Rosalina	23–21, 21–15	(gold) Winner

Women's doubles
Year	Tournament	Partner	Opponent	Score	Result
2004	Syed Modi International	(Malaysia) Wong Mew Choo	(India) Jwala Gutta (India) Shruti Kurien	5–15, 15–17	(silver) Runner-up
2009	Welsh International	(Malaysia) Joanne Quay	(Russia) Valeria Sorokina (Russia) Nina Vislova	14–21, 16–21	(silver) Runner-up
2010	Welsh International	(Malaysia) Joanne Quay	(Sweden) Louise Eriksson (Sweden) Amanda Wallin	21–13, 21–11	(gold) Winner

BWF International Challenge tournament
BWF International Series tournament
BWF Future Series tournament
