= Chau Hoi Wah =

Hong Kong badminton player (born 1986)

Chau Hoi Wah 周凱華
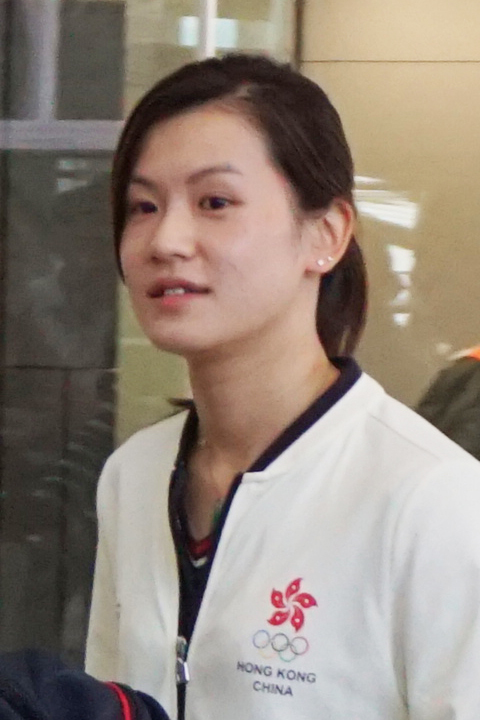
- Hoi Wah in 2016

Personal information
- Full name: Cathy Chau Hoi Wah
- Born: 5 June 1986 (age 40) Hong Kong
- Height: 1. 65 m
- Weight: 60 kg (132 lb)

Sport
- Country: Hong Kong
- Sport: Badminton
- Handedness: Left
- Retired: 5 June 2020

Women's singles, Women's doubles, Mixed doubles
- Career record: 242 wins, 202 losses
- Career title: 9
- Highest ranking: 6 (16 June 2014)
- BWF profile
Medal record
Women's badminton
Representing Hong Kong
World Championships
Bronze medal – third place	2017 Glasgow	Mixed doubles
Asian Championships
Gold medal – first place	2014 Gimcheon	Mixed doubles
Silver medal – second place	2015 Wuhan	Mixed doubles
Bronze medal – third place	2013 Taipei	Mixed doubles
Bronze medal – third place	2017 Wuhan	Mixed doubles
Asia Mixed Team Championships
Bronze medal – third place	2019 Hong Kong	Mixed team
East Asian Games
Silver medal – second place	2013 Tianjin	Mixed doubles
Bronze medal – third place	2009 Hong Kong	Mixed doubles
Bronze medal – third place	2009 Hong Kong	Women's team
Bronze medal – third place	2013 Tianjin	Women's team

Cathy Chau Hoi Wah (Chinese: 周凱華, born 5 June 1986) is a Hong Kong badminton player, specializes in doubles play. She was the first ever Hong Kong player that won the Asian Championships in 2014, and also a bronze medalist at the World Championships in 2017 alongside Lee Chun Hei. She competed at the Asian Games for four consecutive times from 2006 to 2018, and also in 2016 Summer Olympics.

== Career ==
Born in Hong Kong, Chau moved to Canada together with her family when she was 9 years old. She returned to Hong Kong in 2005, and joining national training center. Partnered with Lee Chun Hei, she made a history for Hong Kong badminton, as the first ever Hong Kong player that won the Asian Championships in 2014. Chau and Lee won a Superseries title in 2015 Australian Open, and a bronze medal at the 2017 World Championships. She reached a career high as world number 6 in the mixed doubles event.

Chau spent 15 years of badminton career, and on her 34th birthday (5 June 2020), she announced her retirement from Hong Kong national team through her social media account. She then returned to Toronto, Canada, joining her family, and starting a new career as a coach in Mandarin Badminton Club.

== Achievements ==
=== BWF World Championships ===
Mixed doubles
Year	Venue	Partner	Opponent	Score	Result
2017	Emirates Arena, Glasgow, Scotland	(Hong Kong) Lee Chun Hei	(Indonesia) Tontowi Ahmad (Indonesia) Liliyana Natsir	16–21, 13–21	Bronze

=== Asian Championships ===
Mixed doubles
Year	Venue	Partner	Opponent	Score	Result
2013	Taipei Arena, Taipei, Taiwan	(Hong Kong) Lee Chun Hei	(China) Zhang Nan (China) Zhao Yunlei	16–21, 11–21	Bronze
2014	Gimcheon Indoor Stadium, Gimcheon, South Korea	(Hong Kong) Lee Chun Hei	(South Korea) Shin Baek-cheol (South Korea) Jang Ye-na	13–21, 21–15, 21–15	Gold
2015	Wuhan Sports Center Gymnasium, Wuhan, China	(Hong Kong) Lee Chun Hei	(Indonesia) Tontowi Ahmad (Indonesia) Liliyana Natsir	16–21, 15–21	Silver
2017	Wuhan Sports Center Gymnasium, Wuhan, China	(Hong Kong) Lee Chun Hei	(China) Lu Kai (China) Huang Yaqiong	10–21, 19–21	Bronze

=== East Asian Games ===
Mixed doubles
Year	Venue	Partner	Opponent	Score	Result
2009	Queen Elizabeth Stadium; Hong Kong	(Hong Kong) Yohan Hadikusumo Wiratama	(China) Zhang Nan (China) Ma Jin	14–21, 16–21	Bronze
2013	Binhai New Area Dagang Gymnasium; Tianjin, China	(Hong Kong) Lee Chun Hei	(China) Xu Chen (China) Ma Jin	21–17, 13–21, 13–21	Silver

=== BWF World Tour ===
The BWF World Tour, which was announced on 19 March 2017 and implemented in 2018, is a series of elite badminton tournaments sanctioned by the Badminton World Federation (BWF). The BWF World Tour is divided into levels of World Tour Finals, Super 1000, Super 750, Super 500, Super 300 (part of the HSBC World Tour), and the BWF Tour Super 100.

Mixed doubles
Year	Tournament	Level	Partner	Opponent	Score	Result
2018	Macau Open	Super 300	(Hong Kong) Lee Chun Hei	(Hong Kong) Tang Chun Man (Hong Kong) Tse Ying Suet	14–21, 15–21	(silver) Runner-up

=== BWF Superseries ===
The BWF Superseries, which was launched on 14 December 2006 and implemented in 2007, was a series of elite badminton tournaments, sanctioned by the Badminton World Federation (BWF). BWF Superseries levels were Superseries and Superseries Premier. A season of Superseries consisted of twelve tournaments around the world that had been introduced since 2011. Successful players were invited to the Superseries Finals, which are held at the end of each year.

Mixed doubles
Year	Tournament	Partner	Opponent	Score	Result
2015	Australian Open	(Hong Kong) Lee Chun Hei	(China) Liu Cheng (China) Bao Yixin	21–19, 19–21, 21–15	(gold) Winner

BWF Super Series Finals tournament
BWF Super Series Premier tournament
BWF Super Series tournament

=== BWF Grand Prix ===
The BWF Grand Prix had two levels, the BWF Grand Prix and Grand Prix Gold. It was a series of badminton tournaments sanctioned by the Badminton World Federation (BWF) which was held from 2007 to 2017.

Women's doubles
Year	Tournament	Partner	Opponent	Score	Result
2007	Vietnam Open	(Hong Kong) Koon Wai Chee	(Indonesia) Natalia Christine Poluakan (Indonesia) Yulianti	19–21, 15–21	(silver) Runner-up

Mixed doubles
Year	Tournament	Partner	Opponent	Score	Result
2007	Vietnam Open	(Hong Kong) Hui Wai Ho	(Indonesia) Tontowi Ahmad (Indonesia) Yulianti	11–21, 13–21	(silver) Runner-up
2008	Macau Open	(Hong Kong) Yohan Hadikusumo Wiratama	(China) Xu Chen (China) Zhao Yunlei	15–21, 16–21	(silver) Runner-up
2009	Australian Open	(Hong Kong) Yohan Hadikusumo Wiratama	(New Zealand) Henry Tam (New Zealand) Donna Haliday	21–11, 21–5	(gold) Winner
2009	New Zealand Open	(Hong Kong) Yohan Hadikusumo Wiratama	(Indonesia) Fran Kurniawan (Indonesia) Pia Zebadiah Bernadet	13–21, 19–21	(silver) Runner-up
2012	Chinese Taipei Open	(Hong Kong) Lee Chun Hei	(Indonesia) Muhammad Rijal (Indonesia) Debby Susanto	14–21, 14–21	(silver) Runner-up
2013	U.S. Open	(Hong Kong) Lee Chun Hei	(China) Wang Yilyu (China) Huang Yaqiong	21–8, 21–14	(gold) Winner
2013	Canada Open	(Hong Kong) Lee Chun Hei	(Netherlands) Jorrit de Ruiter (Netherlands) Samantha Barning	21–13, 21–10	(gold) Winner
2015	U.S. Open	(Hong Kong) Lee Chun Hei	(China) Huang Kaixiang (China) Huang Dongping	15–21, 14–21	(silver) Runner-up
2015	Canada Open	(Hong Kong) Lee Chun Hei	(Indonesia) Andrei Adistia (Indonesia) Vita Marissa	21–16, 21–18	(gold) Winner

BWF Grand Prix Gold tournament
BWF Grand Prix tournament

=== BWF International Challenge/Series ===
Women's doubles
Year	Tournament	Partner	Opponent	Score	Result
2010	Polish International	(Hong Kong) Chan Tsz Ka	(Singapore) Shinta Mulia Sari (Singapore) Yao Lei	21–18, 16–21, 10–21	(silver) Runner-up

Mixed doubles
Year	Tournament	Partner	Opponent	Score	Result
2011	Austrian International	(Hong Kong) Wong Wai Hong	(Denmark) Mads Pieler Kolding (Denmark) Julie Houmann	21–17, 21–11	(gold) Winner
2012	Austrian International	(Hong Kong) Wong Wai Hong	(Switzerland) Anthony Dumartheray (Switzerland) Sabrina Jaquet	21–6, 21–10	(gold) Winner
2013	Austrian International	(Hong Kong) Lee Chun Hei	(Hong Kong) Chan Yun Lung (Hong Kong) Tse Ying Suet	21–15, 16–21, 16–21	(silver) Runner-up
2013	Vietnam International	(Hong Kong) Lee Chun Hei	(Hong Kong) Chan Yun Lung (Hong Kong) Tse Ying Suet	4–21, 21–17, 17–21	(silver) Runner-up
2019	Mongolia International	(Hong Kong) Mak Hee Chun	(Thailand) Ratchapol Makkasasithorn (Thailand) Benyapa Aimsaard	22–20, 21–15	(gold) Winner

BWF International Challenge tournament
BWF International Series tournament
BWF Future Series tournament
