= Natalia Christine Poluakan =

Indonesian badminton player (born 1985)

Personal information
- Born: 19 December 1985 (age 40) Kawangkoan, North Sulawesi, Indonesia
- Height: 1.59 m (5 ft 3 in)

Sport
- Country: Indonesia
- Sport: Badminton
- Handedness: Right

Women's & mixed doubles
- Highest ranking: 217 (WD 29 August 2013); 103 (XD 11 July 2013)
- BWF profile
Medal record
Women's badminton
Representing Indonesia
Asian Championships
Bronze medal – third place	2005 Hyderabad	Women's doubles
Southeast Asian Games
Bronze medal – third place	2005 Manila	Women's team

Natalia Christine Poluakan (born 19 December 1985) is an Indonesian badminton player. She won Vietnam Open tournament with her partners Yulianti in 2007, and a bronze medal at the 2005 Asian Badminton Championships in Hyderabad, India with Lita Nurlita.

== Achievements ==
=== Asian Championships ===
Women's doubles
Year	Venue	Partner	Opponent	Score	Result
2005	Gachibowli Indoor Stadium; Hyderabad, India	(Indonesia) Lita Nurlita	(South Korea) Lee Hyo-jung (South Korea) Lee Kyung-won	5–15, 12–15	Bronze

=== BWF Grand Prix ===
The BWF Grand Prix had two levels, the Grand Prix and Grand Prix Gold. It was a series of badminton tournaments sanctioned by the Badminton World Federation (BWF) and played between 2007 and 2017.

Women's doubles
Year	Tournament	Partner	Opponent	Score	Result
2007	Vietnam Open	(Indonesia) Yulianti	(Hong Kong) Chau Hoi Wah (Hong Kong) Koon Wai Chee	21–19, 21–15	(gold) Winner

BWF Grand Prix Gold tournament
BWF Grand Prix tournament

=== International Challenge/Series ===
Mixed doubles
Year	Tournament	Partner	Opponent	Score	Result
2008	Smiling Fish International	(Indonesia) Viki Indra Okvana	(Indonesia) Lingga Lie (Indonesia) Keshya Nurvita Hanadia	16–21, 21–13, 16–21	(silver) Runner-up

Commonwealth Youth Games tournament
BWF International Series tournament
