= Yulianti =

Indonesian badminton player (born 1987)

Personal information
- Born: 18 July 1987 (age 39) Palembang, South Sumatra, Indonesia

Sport
- Country: Indonesia
- Sport: Badminton
- Handedness: Right
- Event: Women's & mixed doubles

Women's & mixed doubles
- BWF profile
Medal record
Women's badminton
Representing Indonesia
Asian Junior Championships
Bronze medal – third place	2004 Hwacheon	Girls' team
Bronze medal – third place	2005 Jakarta	Girls' team

Yulianti (born 18 July 1987) is an Indonesia retired badminton player. Yulianti was a successful badminton player who won Smiling Fish in mixed with Lingga Lie. In 2007, she won the Vietnam Open both doubles and mixed. In 2006 and 2007 she won the Indonesia International.

== Achievements ==
=== BWF Grand Prix ===
The BWF Grand Prix had two levels, the Grand Prix and Grand Prix Gold. It was a series of badminton tournaments sanctioned by the Badminton World Federation (BWF) and played between 2007 and 2017.

Women's doubles
Year	Tournament	Partner	Opponent	Score	Result
2007	Vietnam Open	(Indonesia) Natalia Christine Poluakan	(Hong Kong) Chau Hoi Wah (Hong Kong) Koon Wai Chee	21–19, 21–15	(gold) Winner

Mixed doubles
Year	Tournament	Partner	Opponent	Score	Result
2007	Vietnam Open	(Indonesia) Tontowi Ahmad	(Hong Kong) Hui Wai Ho (Hong Kong) Chau Hoi Wah	21–11, 21–13	(gold) Winner

=== BWF International Challenge/Series/Satellite ===
Women's doubles
Year	Tournament	Partner	Opponent	Score	Result
2007	Smiling Fish International	(Indonesia) Richi Puspita Dili	(Indonesia) Bellaetrix Manuputty (Indonesia) Samantha Lintang	Walkover	(gold) Winner
2007	Vietnam International	(Indonesia) Richi Puspita Dili	(South Korea) Ha Jung-eun (South Korea) Kim Min-jung	21–17, 9–21, 21–16	(gold) Winner
2007	Cheers Asian Satellite	(Indonesia) Richi Puspita Dili	(South Korea) Ha Jung-eun (South Korea) Kim Min-jung	18–21, 19–21	(silver) Runner-up

Mixed doubles
Year	Tournament	Partner	Opponent	Score	Result
2006	Thailand Asian Satellite	(Indonesia) Lingga Lie	(Thailand) Songphon Anugritayawon (Thailand) Kunchala Voravichitchaikul	16–21, 21–10, 21–17	(gold) Winner
2006	Jakarta Satellite	(Indonesia) Lingga Lie	(Indonesia) Enroe (Indonesia) Devi Sukma Wijaya	23–21, 21–16	(gold) Winner
2006	Malaysia Satellite	(Indonesia) Tontowi Ahmad	(South Korea) Shin Baek-cheol (South Korea) Kim Min-jung	16–21, 14–21	(silver) Runner-up
2006	Cheers Asian Satellite	(Indonesia) Tontowi Ahmad	(Indonesia) Lingga Lie (Indonesia) Devi Tika Permatasari	17–21, 22–24	(silver) Runner-up
2007	Smiling Fish International	(Indonesia) Tontowi Ahmad	(Thailand) Thitipong Lapho (Thailand) Savitree Amitrapai	21–17, 17–21, 21–17	(gold) Winner
2007	Vietnam International	(Indonesia) Tontowi Ahmad	(Indonesia) Tri Kusharjanto (Indonesia) Yunita Tetty	15–21, 17–21	(silver) Runner-up
2007	Indonesia International	(Indonesia) Tontowi Ahmad	(South Korea) Yoo Yeon-seong (South Korea) Kim Min-jung	21–16, 15–21, 21–9	(gold) Winner

BWF International Challenge tournament
BWF International Series tournament
