= Zhu Jingjing =

Chinese badminton player (born 1985)

Zhu Jingjing 朱晶晶
Personal information
- Born: 7 January 1985 (age 41) Shashi, Hubei, China
- Height: 1.62 m (5 ft 4 in)
- Weight: 55 kg (121 lb)

Sport
- Country: China
- Sport: Badminton
- Handedness: Left
- Event: Women's singles

Women's singles
- BWF profile
Medal record
Women's badminton
Representing China
Asian Junior Championships
Gold medal – first place	2002 Kuala Lumpur	Girls' team
Bronze medal – third place	2002 Kuala Lumpur	Girls' singles

Zhu Jingjing (Chinese: 朱晶晶; born 7 January 1985) is a Chinese badminton player. Born in Shashi, Hubei, Zhu joined the Guangdong team in 1999, and was selected to join the national team in 2001. She was part of the national junior team that competed at the 2002 Asian Junior Championships, winning the gold medal in the girls' team event, and a bronze medal in the singles event. Zhu then suffered lumbar hernia during exercise, and was sent back to Guangdong. Zhu who played for the Guangdong team, became the runner-up at the 2006 National Championships, and was called back to join the national team. In the international event, she was the champion at the 2007 Vietnam Open.

== Achievements ==
=== Asian Junior Championships ===
Girls' singles

Year	Venue	Opponent	Score	Result
2002	Kuala Lumpur Badminton Stadium, Kuala Lumpur, Malaysia	(China) Jiang Yanjiao	5–11, 13–10, 11–13	Bronze

=== BWF Superseries ===
The BWF Superseries has two level such as Superseries and Superseries Premier. A season of Superseries features twelve tournaments around the world, which introduced since 2011, with successful players invited to the Superseries Finals held at the year end.

Women's Singles

Year	Tournament	Opponent	Score	Result
2008	China Open	(China) Jiang Yanjiao	15–21, 13–21	(silver) Runner-up

BWF Superseries Finals tournament
BWF Superseries Premier tournament
BWF Superseries tournament

=== BWF Grand Prix ===
The BWF Grand Prix has two level such as Grand Prix and Grand Prix Gold. It is a series of badminton tournaments, sanctioned by Badminton World Federation (BWF) since 2007. The World Badminton Grand Prix sanctioned by International Badminton Federation (IBF) since 1983.

Women's singles

Year	Tournament	Opponent	Score	Result
2007	Vietnam Open	(Japan) Yu Hirayama	21–10, 21–10	(gold) Winner
2007	Philippines Open	(Hong Kong) Zhou Mi	18–21, 12–21	(silver) Runner-up

BWF Grand Prix Gold tournament
BWF & IBF Grand Prix tournament

=== BWF International Challenge/Series ===
Women's singles

Year	Tournament	Opponent	Score	Result
2007	Austrian International	(Japan) Yoshimi Hataya	21–7, 21–14	(gold) Winner

BWF International Challenge tournament
BWF International Series tournament
