= Tsai Pei-ling =

Taiwanese badminton player (born 1987)

Tsai Pei-ling 蔡佩玲
Personal information
- Born: 8 March 1987 (age 39)
- Height: 1.71 m (5 ft 7 in)
- Weight: 67 kg (148 lb)

Sport
- Country: Taiwan
- Sport: Badminton
- Handedness: Right

Women's doubles
- Highest ranking: 62 (4 November 2010)
- BWF profile
Medal record
Women's badminton
Representing Chinese Taipei
East Asian Games
Silver medal – second place	2013 Tianjin	Women's team
Summer Universiade
Bronze medal – third place	2013 Kazan	Mixed team
Bronze medal – third place	2007 Bangkok	Mixed team
Asian Junior Championships
Bronze medal – third place	2004 Hwacheon	Girls' team

Tsai Pei-ling (Chinese: 蔡佩玲; pinyin: Cài Pèilíng; born 8 March 1987) is a Taiwanese badminton player. She was part of the national junior team that won the bronze medal at the 2004 Asian Junior Championships in the girls' team event. She graduated at the University of Taipei. Tsai was the champion at the Kaohsiung International tournament in the women's doubles event partnered with Chou Chia-chi. At the Grand Prix tournament, she finished as the women's doubles runner-up at the 2008 U.S. Open.

== Achievements ==
=== BWF Grand Prix ===
The BWF Grand Prix has two level such as Grand Prix and Grand Prix Gold. It is a series of badminton tournaments, sanctioned by Badminton World Federation (BWF) since 2007.

Women's doubles
Year	Tournament	Partner	Opponent	Score	Result
2008	U.S. Open	(Chinese Taipei) Yang Chia-chen	(Chinese Taipei) Chang Li-ying (Chinese Taipei) Hung Shih-chieh	19–21, 14–21	(silver) Runner-up

BWF Grand Prix Gold tournament
BWF Grand Prix tournament

=== BWF International Challenge/Series ===
Women's doubles
Year	Tournament	Partner	Opponent	Score	Result
2010	Kaohsiung International	(Chinese Taipei) Chou Chia-chi	(Thailand) Rodjana Chuthabunditkul (Thailand) Wiranpatch Hongchookeat	21–11, 21–12	(gold) Winner

BWF International Challenge tournament
BWF International Series tournament
