= Lingga Lie =

Indonesian badminton player (born 1986)

Personal information
- Born: 15 July 1986 (age 40) Bogor, West Java

Sport
- Country: Indonesia
- Sport: Badminton
- Handedness: Right

Men's & mixed doubles
- Highest ranking: 22 (MD) 17 Feb 2009; 44 (XD) 22 Aug 2006
- BWF profile
Medal record
Men's badminton
Representing Indonesia
Asian Junior Championships
Bronze medal – third place	2004 Hwacheon	Boys' team

Lingga Lie (born 15 July 1986) is a retired male badminton player from Indonesia. Lingga Lie was a runner-up at the New Zealand Open 2008 and third in the Indonesia National Sports Week XVII. In the same year, he won the Smiling Fish and Singapore Asian Satelitte tournament. In 2004 he had become Indonesian junior champion in mixed doubles with Yulianti.

== Achievements ==
=== BWF Grand Prix ===
The BWF Grand Prix has two level such as Grand Prix and Grand Prix Gold. It is a series of badminton tournaments, sanctioned by Badminton World Federation (BWF) since 2007.

Men's doubles
Year	Tournament	Partner	Opponent	Score	Result
2008	New Zealand Open	(Indonesia) Fernando Kurniawan	(Chinese Taipei) Chen Hung-ling (Chinese Taipei) Lin Yu-lang	20–22, 10–21	(silver) Runner-up

BWF Grand Prix Gold tournament
BWF Grand Prix tournament

=== BWF International Challenge/Series ===
Men's doubles
Year	Tournament	Partner	Opponent	Score	Result
2008	Singapore Asian Satellite	(Indonesia) Fernando Kurniawan	(Singapore) Chayut Triyachart (Singapore) Danny Bawa Chrisnanta	21–12, 17–21, 21–19	(gold) Winner
2008	Smiling Fish International	(Indonesia) Fernando Kurniawan	(Indonesia) Wifqi Windarto (Indonesia) Afiat Yuris Wirawan	21–16, 21–15	(gold) Winner

Mixed doubles
Year	Tournament	Partner	Opponent	Score	Result
2008	Smiling Fish International	(Indonesia) Keshya Nurvita Hanadia	(Indonesia) Viki Indra Okvana (Indonesia) Natalia Christine Poluakan	21–16, 13–21, 21–16	(gold) Winner
2006	Cheers Asian Satellite	(Indonesia) Devi Tika Permatasari	(Indonesia) Tontowi Ahmad (Indonesia) Yulianti	21–17, 24–22	(gold) Winner
2006	Jakarta Satellite	(Indonesia) Yulianti	(Indonesia) Enroe (Indonesia) Devi Sukma Wijaya	21–16, 13–21, 21–16	(gold) Winner
2006	Smiling Fish Satellite	(Indonesia) Yulianti	(Thailand) Songphon Anugritayawon (Thailand) Kunchala Voravichitchaikul	16–21, 21–10, 21–17	(gold) Winner

BWF International Challenge tournament
BWF International Series tournament
