= Soratja Chansrisukot =

Thai badminton player

Personal information
- Born: 16 February 1985 (age 41)
- Height: 1.67 m (5 ft 6 in)
- Weight: 58 kg (128 lb)

Sport
- Country: Thailand
- Sport: Badminton
- Handedness: Right

Women's singles
- Highest ranking: 25 (29 November 2007)
- BWF profile
Medal record
Women's badminton
Representing Thailand
Southeast Asian Games
Gold medal – first place	2005 Manila	Women's team
Silver medal – second place	2003 Ho Chi Minh	Women's team
Bronze medal – third place	2007 Nakhon Ratchasima	Women's singles
Bronze medal – third place	2007 Nakhon Ratchasima	Women's team
Summer Universiade
Gold medal – first place	2007 Bangkok	Mixed team
Asian Junior Championships
Silver medal – second place	2002 Kuala Lumpur	Girls' doubles

Soratja Chansrisukot (Thai: โสรัจจา จันทร์ศรีสุคต; born 16 February 1985) is a women's singles badminton player from Thailand. In 2006, she competed at the Doha Asian Games. She was one of the national team's top notch, ranked 45. Her best performance was still at satellite-ranked tournaments, when she won the women's singles title at the 2004 India Satellite tournament.

== Achievements ==
=== Southeast Asian Games ===
Women's singles
Year	Venue	Opponent	Score	Result
2007	Wongchawalitkul University; Nakhon Ratchasima, Thailand	(Indonesia) Adriyanti Firdasari	15–21, 19–21	Bronze

=== Asian Junior Championships ===
Girls' doubles
Year	Venue	Partner	Opponent	Score	Result
2002	Kuala Lumpur Badminton Stadium; Kuala Lumpur, Malaysia	(Thailand) Salakjit Ponsana	(China) Du Jing (China) Rong Lu	4–11, 2–11	Silver

=== BWF International Series/Asian Satellite ===
Women's singles
Year	Tournament	Opponent	Score	Result
2007	Smiling Fish International	(Thailand) Salakjit Ponsana	12–21, 4–21, 14–21	(silver) Runner-up
2005	Thailand Satellite	(Thailand) Molthila Meemeak	1–11, 7–11	(silver) Runner-up
2004	India Satellite	(Thailand) Molthila Meemeak	11–9, 11–3	(gold) Winner
2003	Smiling Fish Satellite	(Thailand) Salakjit Ponsana	10–13, 3–11	(silver) Runner-up

Women's doubles
Year	Tournament	Partner	Opponent	Score	Result
2005	Sri Lanka Satellite	(Thailand) Molthila Meemeak	(India) B. R. Meenakshi (India) Trupti Murgunde	9–15, 15–9, 6–15	(silver) Runner-up
2004	India Satellite	(Thailand) Molthila Meemeak	(Indonesia) Apriliana Rintan (Indonesia) Rani Mundiasti	4–15, 5–15	(silver) Runner-up
2002	India Satellite	(Thailand) Salakjit Ponsana	(Thailand) Duanganong Aroonkesorn (Thailand) Kunchala Voravichitchaikul	1–11, 6–11	(silver) Runner-up
