= Yu Hirayama =

Japanese badminton player (born 1985)

Yū Hirayama
Personal information
- Born: 25 July 1985 (age 41) Shiogama, Miyagi Prefecture, Japan
- Height: 1.63 m (5 ft 4 in)

Sport
- Country: Japan
- Sport: Badminton
- Handedness: Right
- Retired: 31 March 2012

Women's singles
- Highest ranking: 28 (19 August 2010)
- BWF profile
Medal record
Women's badminton
Representing Japan
Uber Cup
Bronze medal – third place	2010 Kuala Lumpur	Women's team
Asian Junior Championships
Bronze medal – third place	2002 Kuala Lumpur	Girls' team

Yu Hirayama (平山 優, Hirayama Yū; born 25 July 1985) is a former Japanese badminton player. She was born in Shiogama city, in Miyagi prefecture, and graduated from St. Ursula High School. She is now a sophomore at the School of Social Sciences. She won the first prize of the inter-high school athletic meet when she was a second grade high school student, and the next year, she won the all-Japan second prize. She joined the Unisys badminton team in 2008, and was part of the Japanese team which played in the World Ladies' Championship (Uber Cup) and other worldwide tournaments.

== Achievements ==
=== BWF Grand Prix ===
The BWF Grand Prix had two levels, the Grand Prix and Grand Prix Gold. It was a series of badminton tournaments sanctioned by the Badminton World Federation (BWF) and played between 2007 and 2017.

Women's singles

Year	Tournament	Opponent	Score	Result	Ref
2007	Vietnam Open	(China) Zhu Jingjing	10–21, 10–21	(silver) Runner-up	
2009	Bitburger Open	(Germany) Juliane Schenk	18–21, 10–21	(silver) Runner-up	

BWF Grand Prix tournament

=== BWF International Challenge/Series ===
Women's singles

Year	Tournament	Opponent	Score	Result
2009	Swedish International	(Malaysia) Anita Raj Kaur	21–15, 21–14	(gold) Winner

BWF International Challenge tournament
BWF International Series tournament
