= Kenn Lim =

Malaysian badminton player (born 1986)

Kenn Lim 林生勤
Personal information
- Born: 20 May 1986 (age 40) Alor Setar, Kedah, Malaysia

Sport
- Country: Malaysia
- Sport: Badminton
- Event: Men's singles

Men's singles
- BWF profile
Medal record
Men's badminton
Representing Malaysia
Asian Junior Championships
Bronze medal – third place	2004 Hwacheon	Boys' team

Kenn Lim (born 20 May 1986) is a Malaysian badminton player. He was part of the Malaysian junior team that won the bronze medal at the 2004 Asian Junior Championships in the boys' team event. He was the champion at the 2006 Sri Lanka Satellite and 2010 Portugal International tournament in the men's singles event. Lim who was educated at the Leeds Metropolitan University was the 2008 runner-up and 2009 champion at the BUCS Badminton Championships, and also won the 2008 Wimbledon National Elite Open. Lim represented Yorkshire at the Badminton England circuit, and clinched the men's singles title at the Northumberland Championships.

== Achievements ==
=== BWF International Challenge/Series ===
Men's singles

Year	Tournament	Opponent	Score	Result
2010	Portugal International	(Germany) Fabian Hammes	21–14, 21–17	(gold) Winner
2006	Sri Lanka Satellite	(Malaysia) Tan Chun Seang	20–22, 21–18, 21–8	(gold) Winner

BWF International Challenge tournament
BWF International Series tournament
