= Khoo Chung Chiat =

Malaysian badminton player (born 1986)

Khoo Chung Chiat 邱忠杰
Personal information
- Born: 28 September 1986 (age 40) Alor Setar, Kedah, Malaysia
- Height: 1.79 m (5 ft 10 in)
- Weight: 78 kg (172 lb)

Sport
- Country: Malaysia
- Sport: Badminton
- Event: Men's doubles

Men's doubles
- BWF profile
Medal record
Men's badminton
Representing Malaysia
Southeast Asian Games
Bronze medal – third place	2007 Nakhon Ratchasima	Men's team
Asian Junior Championships
Bronze medal – third place	2004 Hwacheon	Boys' team

Khoo Chung Chiat (born 28 September 1986) is a Malaysian badminton player. He was part of the Malaysian junior team that won the bronze medal at the 2004 Asian Junior Championships in the boys' team event. In the senior event, he was the men's doubles champion at the 2007 Singapore Cheers Asian Satellite in the men's doubles event partnered with Chang Hun Pin. Teamed-up with Mohd Razif Abdul Latif, they finished as the runner-up at the 2006 Sri Lanka Satellite and 2007 Malaysia International tournament. Khoo played at the 2007 Southeast Asian Games, winning the bronze medal in the men's team event.

== Achievements ==
=== BWF International Challenge/Series ===
Men's doubles
Year	Tournament	Partner	Opponent	Score	Result
2007	Malaysia International	(Malaysia) Mohd Razif Abdul Latif	(Malaysia) Chang Hun Pin (Malaysia) Chan Peng Soon	14–21, 21–11, 11–21	(silver) Runner-up
2007	Cheers Asian Satellite	(Malaysia) Chang Hun Pin	(Indonesia) Mohammad Ahsan (Indonesia) Bona Septano	19–21, 21–10, 23–21	(gold) Winner
2006	Sri Lanka Satellite	(Malaysia) Mohd Razif Abdul Latif	(Malaysia) Chang Hun Pin (Malaysia) Chan Peng Soon	21–18, 14–21, 19–21	(silver) Runner-up

BWF International Challenge tournament
BWF International Series tournament
