= Vietnam Open (badminton) =

Annual badminton championships in Vietnam

- Official website
- Founded: 1996; 30 years ago
- Editions: 21 (2026)
- Location: Ho Chi Minh City; Vietnam
- Venue: Nguyen Du Club (2026)
- Prize money: US$120,000 (2026)

Men's
- Draw: 48S / 32D
- Current champions: Aidil Sholeh (singles); Chen Zhi-ray Lin Yu-chieh (doubles)
- Most singles titles: 4 Nguyễn Tiến Minh
- Most doubles titles: 2 Choong Tan Fook; Ko Sung-hyun; Lee Wan Wah; Bona Septano

Women's
- Draw: 32S / 32D
- Current champions: Sarunrak Vitidsarn (singles); Kim Yu-jung Lee Yu-lim (doubles)
- Most singles titles: 3 Nguyễn Thùy Linh
- Most doubles titles: 2 Anneke Feinya Agustin; Rosyita Eka Putri Sari; Della Destiara Haris; Rizki Amelia Pradipta

Mixed doubles
- Draw: 32
- Current champions: Ma Xixiang; Qin Huizhi
- Most titles (male): 2 Tontowi Ahmad
- Most titles (female): 1 all winners

Super 100
- Al Ain Masters; Akita Masters (2018–2019); Baoji China Masters; Dutch Open (2018–2019); Hyderabad Open (2018–2019); Indonesia Masters Super 100; Kaohsiung Masters; Malaysia Super 100; Guwahati Masters; Odisha Masters; Ruichang China Masters; Russian Open (2018–2019); Scottish Open (2018); Vietnam Open

Last completed
- 2026 Vietnam Open

The Vietnam Open (Vietnamese: Giải cầu lông Việt Nam mở rộng) is an international Badminton open held in Vietnam since 1996.The tournament is a part of the BWF World Tour tournaments and is leveled in BWF Tour Super 100.

In the first edition, the 1997 Badminton Asia Championships runners-up Lee Wan Wah and Choong Tan Fook were the winners in the men's doubles event. After another edition in 1997, the championships were halted for 8 years, then held again in the BWF calendar in 2006. In 2007, it was established as a BWF Grand Prix event until 2017.

== Previous winners ==
Year	Men's singles	Women's singles	Men's doubles	Women's doubles	Mixed doubles
1996	(Indonesia) Nunung Subandoro	(China) Zeng Yaqiong	(Malaysia) Choong Tan Fook (Malaysia) Lee Wan Wah	(China) Peng Xingyong (China) Zhang Jin	(China) Liu Yong (China) Zhang Jin
1997	(China) Chen Gang	(Indonesia) Susi Susanti	(Indonesia) Rexy Mainaky (Indonesia) Ricky Subagja	(Indonesia) Eliza Nathanael (Indonesia) Zelin Resiana	(Indonesia) Bambang Supriyanto (Indonesia) Rosalina Riseu
1998– 2005	No competition				
2006	(England) Andrew Smith	(South Korea) Bae Seung-hee	(South Korea) Yoo Yeon-seong (South Korea) Jeon Jun-bum	(South Korea) Kim Jin-ock (South Korea) Lee Jung-mi	(South Korea) Yoo Yeon-seong (South Korea) Lee Jung-mi
2007	(Malaysia) Roslin Hashim	(China) Zhu Jingjing	(South Korea) Ko Sung-hyun (South Korea) Kwon Yi-goo	(Indonesia) Natalia Christine Poluakan (Indonesia) Yulianti	(Indonesia) Tontowi Ahmad (Indonesia) Yulianti
2008	(Vietnam) Nguyễn Tiến Minh	(Singapore) Zhang Beiwen	(Malaysia) Choong Tan Fook (Malaysia) Lee Wan Wah	(Indonesia) Shendy Puspa Irawati (Indonesia) Meiliana Jauhari	(Indonesia) Tontowi Ahmad (Indonesia) Shendy Puspa Irawati
2009	(Vietnam) Nguyễn Tiến Minh	(Indonesia) Fransisca Ratnasari	(Indonesia) Luluk Hadiyanto (Indonesia) Joko Riyadi	(Indonesia) Anneke Feinya Agustin (Indonesia) Annisa Wahyuni	(Indonesia) Flandy Limpele (Chinese Taipei) Cheng Wen-hsing
2010	(China) Chen Yuekun	(Thailand) Ratchanok Intanon	(Indonesia) Mohammad Ahsan (Indonesia) Bona Septano	(China) Ma Jin (China) Zhong Qianxin	(China) He Hanbin (China) Ma Jin
2011	(Vietnam) Nguyễn Tiến Minh	(Singapore) Fu Mingtian	(Indonesia) Angga Pratama (Indonesia) Rian Agung Saputro	(Indonesia) Anneke Feinya Agustin (Indonesia) Nitya Krishinda Maheswari	(Russia) Vitalij Durkin (Russia) Nina Vislova
2012	(Vietnam) Nguyễn Tiến Minh	(Thailand) Porntip Buranaprasertsuk	(Thailand) Bodin Isara (Thailand) Maneepong Jongjit	(Indonesia) Pia Zebadiah Bernadet (Indonesia) Rizki Amelia Pradipta	(Indonesia) Markis Kido (Indonesia) Pia Zebadiah Bernadet
2013	(South Korea) Son Wan-ho	(China) He Bingjiao	(Indonesia) Fran Kurniawan (Indonesia) Bona Septano	(South Korea) Go Ah-ra (South Korea) Yoo Hae-won	(South Korea) Choi Sol-gyu (South Korea) Chae Yoo-jung
2014	(Indonesia) Dionysius Hayom Rumbaka	(Japan) Nozomi Okuhara	(Indonesia) Andrei Adistia (Indonesia) Hendra Aprida Gunawan	(Indonesia) Maretha Dea Giovani (Indonesia) Rosyita Eka Putri Sari	(Indonesia) Muhammad Rijal (Indonesia) Vita Marissa
2015	(Indonesia) Tommy Sugiarto	(Japan) Saena Kawakami	(China) Li Junhui (China) Liu Yuchen	(Thailand) Jongkolphan Kititharakul (Thailand) Rawinda Prajongjai	(China) Huang Kaixiang (China) Huang Dongping
2016	(Hong Kong) Wong Wing Ki	(Singapore) Yeo Jia Min	(Chinese Taipei) Lee Jhe-huei (Chinese Taipei) Lee Yang	(Indonesia) Della Destiara Haris (Indonesia) Rosyita Eka Putri Sari	(Malaysia) Tan Kian Meng (Malaysia) Lai Pei Jing
2017	(Thailand) Khosit Phetpradab	(Japan) Sayaka Takahashi	(Indonesia) Wahyu Nayaka (Indonesia) Ade Yusuf Santoso	(Thailand) Chayanit Chaladchalam (Thailand) Phataimas Muenwong	(Indonesia) Alfian Eko Prasetya (Indonesia) Melati Daeva Oktavianti
2018	(Indonesia) Shesar Hiren Rhustavito	(Singapore) Yeo Jia Min	(South Korea) Ko Sung-hyun (South Korea) Shin Baek-cheol	(Japan) Misato Aratama (Japan) Akane Watanabe	(Thailand) Nipitphon Phuangphuapet (Thailand) Savitree Amitrapai
2019	(India) Sourabh Verma	(China) Zhang Yiman	(South Korea) Choi Sol-gyu (South Korea) Seo Seung-jae	(Indonesia) Della Destiara Haris (Indonesia) Rizki Amelia Pradipta	(China) Guo Xinwa (China) Zhang Shuxian
2020	Cancelled due to COVID-19 pandemic (Note: This tournament, originally to be played from 25 to 30 August, was later cancelled due to the COVID-19 pandemic in Vietnam.) (Note: This tournament, originally to be played from 14 to 19 September, was later cancelled due to the COVID-19 pandemic in Vietnam.)				
2021	Cancelled due to COVID-19 pandemic				
2022	(Japan) Kodai Naraoka	(Vietnam) Nguyễn Thùy Linh	(China) Ren Xiangyu (China) Tan Qiang	(Thailand) Benyapa Aimsaard (Thailand) Nuntakarn Aimsaard	(Indonesia) Dejan Ferdinansyah (Indonesia) Gloria Emanuelle Widjaja
2023	(Chinese Taipei) Huang Yu-kai	(Vietnam) Nguyễn Thùy Linh	(Japan) Kenya Mitsuhashi (Japan) Hiroki Okamura	(Chinese Taipei) Hsieh Pei-shan (Chinese Taipei) Tseng Yu-chi	(Japan) Hiroki Nishi (Japan) Akari Sato
2024	(Japan) Shogo Ogawa	(Vietnam) Nguyễn Thùy Linh	(Chinese Taipei) He Zhi-wei (Chinese Taipei) Huang Jui-hsuan	(Japan) Mizuki Otake (Japan) Miyu Takahashi	(Indonesia) Adnan Maulana (Indonesia) Indah Cahya Sari Jamil
2025	(Thailand) Panitchaphon Teeraratsakul	(China) Cai Yanyan	(South Korea) Jin Yong (South Korea) Na Sung-seung	(China) Luo Yi (China) Wang Tingge	(Indonesia) Marwan Faza (Indonesia) Aisyah Pranata
2026	(Malaysia) Aidil Sholeh	(Thailand) Sarunrak Vitidsarn	(Chinese Taipei) Chen Zhi-ray (Chinese Taipei) Lin Yu-chieh	(South Korea) Kim Yu-jung (South Korea) Lee Yu-lim	(China) Ma Xixiang (China) Qin Huizhi

== Performances by nation ==
As of the 2026 edition

Pos	Nation	MS	WS	MD	WD	XD	Total
1	Indonesia	4	2	7	9	9.5	31.5
2	China	2	5	2	3	5	17
3	South Korea	1	1	5	3	2	12
4	Thailand	2	3	1	3	1	10
5	Japan	2	3	1	2	1	9
6	Vietnam*	4	3				7
7	Chinese Taipei	1		3	1	0.5	5.5
8	Malaysia	2		2		1	5
9	Singapore		4				4
10	England	1					1
10	India	1					1
10	Hong Kong	1					1
10	Russia					1	1
Total		21	21	21	21	21	105

* Host nation

== See also ==
- Vietnam International Challenge
- Vietnam International Series
