= Koon Wai Chee =

Hong Kong badminton player (born 1980)

Louisa Koon Wai Chee 官惠慈
Personal information
- Born: 26 July 1980 (age 45)
- Height: 174 cm (5 ft 9 in)

Sport
- Country: Hong Kong
- Sport: Badminton
- Handedness: Right
- BWF profile
Medal record
Women's badminton
Representing Hong Kong
Uber Cup
Bronze medal – third place	2002 Guangzhou	Women's team
Asian Games
Bronze medal – third place	2002 Busan	Women's team
Asian Championships
Bronze medal – third place	2003 Jakarta	Mixed doubles

Koon Wai Chee Louisa (Chinese: 官惠慈; Jyutping: gun^{2} wai^{6} zi^{1}) (born 26 July 1980) is a badminton player from Hong Kong.

Koon competed in badminton at the 2004 Summer Olympics in women's doubles with partner Li Wing Mui. They were defeated by Gail Emms and Donna Kellogg of Great Britain in the round of 32.
