= 2008 BWF World Junior Championships – girls' doubles =

2008 BWF World Junior Championships girls' doubles
Tournament details
- Dates: 29 October 2008 – 2 November 2008
- Edition: 10th
- Level: International
- Venue: Shree Shiv Chhatrapati Sports Complex
- Location: Pune, India

The girls' doubles event for the 2008 BWF World Junior Championships was held between 29 October and 2 November. Fu Mingtian and Yao Lei became the first ever Singaporeans to win the title.

== Seeded ==
1. CHN Xie Jing / Zhong Qianxin (final)
2. CHN Lu Lu / Xia Huan (semi-final)
3. TPE Chiang Kai-hsin / Tien Ching-yung (third round)
4. KOR Eom Hye-won / Jung Kyung-eun (second round)
5. NED Selena Piek / Iris Tabeling (third round)
6. GER Franziska Burkert / Carla Nelte (third round)
7. JPN Ayaka Takahashi / Koharu Yonemoto (quarter-final)
8. HKG Chan Tsz Ka / Tse Ying Suet (quarter-final)

== Draw ==
=== Finals ===
Semifinals
1	CHN Xie Jing; CHN Zhong Qianxin	21	22
INA Anneke Feinya Agustin; INA Annisa Wahyuni	19	20
SIN Fu Mingtian; SIN Yao Lei	21	13	21
2	CHN Lu Lu; CHN Xia Huan	18	21	18

Final
1	CHN Xie Jing; CHN Zhong Qianxin	19	17
SIN Fu Mingtian; SIN Yao Lei	21	21

==== Section 1 ====
First round
RUS A Chervaykova; RUS R Gabdullina	21	20	20
TUR Ö Bayrak; TUR E Tunalı	13	22	22
THA R Chuthabunditkul; THA S Taerattanachai	21	21
SIN Mok JQ; SIN Thng TT	15	13

Second round
1	CHN Xie J CHN Zhong QX	21	21
KOR Lee J-h; KOR Lee S-r	13	13
SRI S Illangakoon; SRI A Rathnasiri	13	15
TUR Ö Bayrak; TUR E Tunalı	21	21
5/8	NED S Piek; NED I Tabeling	21	21
CAN M Li; CAN C Petersen	9	14
MAS Chong VV; MAS Lai PJ	17	15
THA R Chuthabunditkul; THA S Taerattanachai	21	21

Third round
1	CHN Xie J CHN Zhong QX	21	21
TUR Ö Bayrak; TUR E Tunalı	7	12
5/8	NED S Piek; NED I Tabeling	8	23
THA R Chuthabunditkul; THA S Taerattanachai	21	25

Quarterfinal
1	CHN Xie J CHN Zhong QX	21	21
THA R Chuthabunditkul; THA S Taerattanachai	10	19

==== Section 2 ====
First round
GER L Heidenreich; GER M Stahlberg	16	8
INA A Agustin; INA A Wahyuni	21	21
EGY M El Tanany; EGY N El Banna	5	6
IND P Thulasi; IND S Reddy	21	21
FRA A Fontaine; FRA M Luttmann	21	21
EST G Saar; EST L Vana	19	11

Second round
3/4	TPE Chiang K-h; TPE Tien C-y	21	21
HKG Chan H Y HKG Poon L Y	16	16
NZL J Jonggowisastro; NZL M O'Connor	9	9
INA A Agustin; INA A Wahyuni	21	21
5/8	JPN A Takahashi; JPN K Yonemoto	21	21
ENG A Lim; ENG K Robertshaw	18	10
IND P Thulasi; IND S Reddy	19	21	19
FRA A Fontaine; FRA M Luttmann	21	14	21

Third round
3/4	TPE Chiang K-h; TPE Tien C-y	9	16
INA A Agustin; INA A Wahyuni	21	21
5/8	JPN A Takahashi; JPN K Yonemoto	21	21
FRA A Fontaine; FRA M Luttmann	18	11

Quarterfinal
INA A Agustin; INA A Wahyuni	27	21
5/8	JPN A Takahashi; JPN K Yonemoto	25	13

==== Section 3 ====
First round
IND P Gadre; IND S Kelkar	14	21	21
ENG A Langley; ENG L Smith	21	18	17
JPN S Takahashi; JPN E Tamaki	21	21
RUS E Komendrovskaya; RUS A Nazarchuk	13	8
TUR Ö Çalışkan; TUR R Kurtuluş	21	20	27
EST K Margus; EST G Teder	19	22	25

Second round
IND P Gadre; IND S Kelkar	14	15
JPN S Takahashi; JPN E Tamaki	21	21
CAN K Lougheed; CAN S Pakenham	16	14
5/8	HKG Chan TK; HKG Tse YS	21	21
TUR Ö Çalışkan; TUR R Kurtuluş	16	17
CZE P Hofmanová; CZE Š Křížková	21	21
SIN Fu MT; SIN Yao L	14	21	21
3/4	KOR Eom H-w; KOR Jung K-e	21	13	19

Third round
JPN S Takahashi; JPN E Tamaki	19	13
5/8	HKG Chan TK; HKG Tse YS	21	21
CZE P Hofmanová; CZE Š Křížková	11	13
SIN Fu MT; SIN Yao L	21	21

Quarterfinal
5/8	HKG Chan TK; HKG Tse YS	21	19	6
SIN Fu MT; SIN Yao L	15	21	21

==== Section 4 ====
First round
MAS V Hoo; MAS S Saniru	19	21	18
TPE Cheng W-h; TPE Peng H-c	21	18	21
NZL E Ang; NZL K Gregory	5	13
INA A Hudiono; INA W Setyawati	21	21

Second round
TPE Cheng W-h; TPE Peng H-c	21	21
SRI S Dahanayake; SRI G Perera	9	12
KEN S Njage; KEN M Muli	WO
5/8	GER F Burkert; GER C Nelte
INA A Hudiono; INA W Setyawati	21	21
SCO K McGlynn; SCO G Sloan	12	8
EGY N Ashraf; EGY D Khairy	1	3
2	CHN Lu L CHN Xia H	21	21

Third round
TPE Cheng W-h; TPE Peng H-c	13	21	21
5/8	GER F Burkert; GER C Nelte	21	13	19
INA A Hudiono; INA W Setyawati	13	13
2	CHN Lu L CHN Xia H	21	21

Quarterfinal
TPE Cheng W-h; TPE Peng H-c	17	19
2	CHN Lu L CHN Xia H	21	21
