= 2006 BWF World Junior Championships – Mixed doubles =

2006 BWF World Junior Championships Mixed doubles
Tournament details
- Dates: 6 November 2006 – 11 November 2006
- Edition: 8th
- Level: International
- Venue: Samsan World Gymnasium=
- Location: Incheon, South Korea

The Mixed doubles tournament of the 2006 BWF World Junior Championships was a badminton world junior individual championships for the Eye Level Cups, held on November 6–11, 2006. The defending champions were He Hanbin and Yu Yang from China. The host pair Lee Yong-dae and Yoo Hyun-young won the gold medal in this event after beating Li Tian and Ma Jin of China in rubber games with the score 18–21, 21–19, 21–14.

== Seeded ==
1. Lee Yong-Dae / Yoo Hyun-Young (champion)
2. Tan Wee Kiong / Woon Khe Wei (fourth round)
3. Hu Wenqing / Wang Xiaoli (semi-final)
4. Liu Xiaolong / Liao Jingmei (semi-final)
5. Boris Ma / Victoria Na (third round)
6. Kevin Dennerly-Minturn / Emma Rodgers (third round)
7. Mads Pieler Kolding / Line Damkjær Kruse (quarter-final)
8. Viki Indra Okvana / Richi Puspita Dili (quarter-final)
9. Cho Gun-Woo / Hong Soo-Jung (third round)
10. Chris Adcock / Gabrielle White (fourth round)
11. Emmanuel Pun / Lauren Todt (second round)
12. Gordey Kosenko / Victoria Yushkova (second round)
13. Henry Tam / Danielle Barry (third round)
14. Illian Krastev / Dimitria Popstoikova (second round)
15. Mohd Lutfi Zaim Abdul Khalid / Goh Liu Ying (fourth round)
16. Wong Shu Ki / Chan Tsz Ka (second round)

== Finals ==
Quarterfinals
1	(South Korea) Lee Yong-Dae (South Korea) Yoo Hyun-Young	21	21
(Chinese Taipei) Liao Wei-Cheng (Chinese Taipei) Hsieh Pei-Chen	16	8
3/4	(China) Liu Xiaolong (China) Liao Jingmei	20	21	21
5/8	(Denmark) Mads Pieler Kolding (Denmark) Line Damkjaer Kruse	22	16	15
(Malaysia) Goh V Shem (Malaysia) Sannatasah Saniru	19	14
3/4	(China) Hu Wenqing (China) Wang Xiaoli	21	21
5/8	(Indonesia) Viki Indra Okvana (Indonesia) Richi Puspita Dili	16	17
(China) Li Tian (China) Ma Jin	21	21

Semifinals
1	(South Korea) Lee Yong-Dae (South Korea) Yoo Hyun-Young	21	21
3/4	(China) Liu Xiaolong (China) Liao Jingmei	14	9
3/4	(China) Hu Wenqing (China) Wang Xiaoli	WO
(China) Li Tian (China) Ma Jin

Final
1	(South Korea) Lee Yong-Dae (South Korea) Yoo Hyun-Young	18	21	21
(China) Li Tian (China) Ma Jin	21	19	14

== Top Half ==
=== Section 1 ===
First round
(England) V Liew (England) S Walker	21	21
(United States) H Shu (United States) R Wang	9	11
(Singapore) T Yeo (Singapore) S Ashikin	21	21
(Egypt) M El Sead (Egypt) H Hosny	11	4
(Russia) N Khakimov (Russia) L Chudentcevc	26	21	15
(Ukraine) A Burlaka (Ukraine) O Chkheidze	28	16	21

Second round
1	(South Korea) Lee Y-D (South Korea) Yoo H-Y	21	21
(Canada) B Fultz (Canada) G Desjardins	7	5
(Indonesia) Subakti (Indonesia) N Maheswari
(England) V Liew (England) S Walker	WO
9/16	(Hong Kong) Wong SK (Hong Kong) Chan TK	16	6
(Japan) H Sasaki (Japan) S Uchida	21	21
(Singapore) T Yeo (Singapore) S Ashikin	17	21	21
(Ukraine) A Burlaka (Ukraine) O Chkheidze	21	14	17

Third round
1	(South Korea) Lee Y-D (South Korea) Yoo H-Y	21	21
(Indonesia) Subakti (Indonesia) N Maheswari	9	10
(Japan) H Sasaki (Japan) S Uchida	21	21
(Singapore) T Yeo (Singapore) S Ashikin	14	10

Fourth round
1	(South Korea) Lee Y-D (South Korea) Yoo H-Y	21	21
(Japan) H Sasaki (Japan) S Uchida	6	8

=== Section 2 ===
First round
(Vietnam) Pham NT (Vietnam) Nguyen PNP	WO
(Macau) Chi ML (Macau) Lao IK
(Chinese Taipei) Liao W-C (Chinese Taipei) Hsieh P-C	18	21	21
(Indonesia) D Chrisnanta (Indonesia) D Susanto	21	16	14
(Denmark) M Larsen (Denmark) J Christiansen	29	21
(China) Zhang YD (China) Wang SY	27	19

Second round
5/8	(New Zealand) K Dennerly-Minturn (New Zealand) E Rodgers	21	21
(South Africa) R Brown (South Africa) S Johnson	11	17
(England) M Ellis (England) S Ward	21	21
(Macau) Chi ML (Macau) Lao IK	12	9
9/16	(Bulgaria) I Krastev (Bulgaria) D Popstoikova	12	21	17
(United States) A Setiadi (United States) A Wen	21	14	21
(Chinese Taipei) Liao W-C (Chinese Taipei) Hsieh P-C	21	18	21
(Denmark) M Larsen (Denmark) J Christiansen	13	21	19

Third round
5/8	(New Zealand) K Dennerly-Minturn (New Zealand) E Rodgers	6	11
(England) M Ellis (England) S Ward	21	21
(United States) A Setiadi (United States) A Wen	6	8
(Chinese Taipei) Liao W-C (Chinese Taipei) Hsieh P-C	21	21

Fourth round
(England) M Ellis (England) S Ward	12	11
(Chinese Taipei) Liao W-C (Chinese Taipei) Hsieh P-C	21	21

=== Section 3 ===
First round
(Ukraine) G Natarov (Ukraine) O Pyvovarova
(Russia) I Sozonov (Russia) K Polikarpova	WO
(Philippines) J Co (Philippines) K Velez	15	21
(Turkey) H Durakcan (Turkey) E Epice	21	23
(Singapore) Chen GR (Singapore) Thng TT
(Sri Lanka) R Dahanayaka (Sri Lanka) S Dahanayake	WO

Second round
3/4	(China) Liu XL (China) Liao JM	21	21
(Pakistan) Z Ghazali (Pakistan) P Basheer	9	6
(Indonesia) F Kurniawan (Indonesia) L Siswanti	21	21
(Ukraine) G Natarov (Ukraine) O Pyvovarova	13	14
9/16	(England) C Adcock (England) G White	21	21
(India) T Kona (India) N Sasale	12	10
(Turkey) H Durakcan (Turkey) E Epice	21	21
(Singapore) Chen GR (Singapore) Thng TT	15	13

Third round
3/4	(China) Liu XL (China) Liao JM	21	21
(Indonesia) F Kurniawan (Indonesia) L Siswanti	16	16
9/16	(England) C Adcock (England) G White	21	21
(Turkey) H Durakcan (Turkey) E Epice	13	16

Fourth round
3/4	(China) Liu XL (China) Liao JM	20	21	21
9/16	(England) C Adcock (England) G White	22	12	12

=== Section 4 ===
First round
(Australia) E Tanaka (Australia) E Pong	8	9
(South Korea) Kim K-J (South Korea) Jung K-E	21	21
(Macau) Lei K (Macau) Lao MH	7	10
(Malaysia) Ong JG (Malaysia) A Anscelly	21	21
(Germany) J Zurwonne (Germany) N Voigt	21	15	21
(Sweden) G Ulldahl (Sweden) J Carlsson	12	21	16
(Czech Republic) J Bitman (Czech Republic) K Ludikova	21	21
(Macau) Lei T (Macau) J Lee	4	10

Second round
5/8	(Denmark) M Kolding (Denmark) L Kruse	21	21
(Netherlands) S Branderhorst (Netherlands) Wong YM	15	18
(South Korea) Kim K-J (South Korea) Jung K-E	20	21	21
(Malaysia) Ong JG (Malaysia) A Anscelly	22	9	18
9/16	(Malaysia) L Abdul Khalid (Malaysia) Goh LY	21	16	21
(Canada) D Snider (Canada) C Cheung	12	21	13
(Germany) J Zurwonne (Germany) N Voigt	18	21	13
(Czech Republic) J Bitman (Czech Republic) K Ludikova	21	19	21

Third round
5/8	(Denmark) M Kolding (Denmark) L Kruse	21	21
(South Korea) Kim K-J (South Korea) Jung K-E	18	17
9/16	(Malaysia) L Abdul Khalid (Malaysia) Goh LY	21	21
(Czech Republic) J Bitman (Czech Republic) K Ludikova	19	19

Fourth round
5/8	(Denmark) M Kolding (Denmark) L Kruse	22	21
9/16	(Malaysia) L Abdul Khalid (Malaysia) Goh LY	20	10

== Bottom Half ==
=== Section 5 ===
First round
(Turkey) G Kundakci (Turkey) O Caliskan	16	17
(South Africa) R Abrahams (South Africa) J Fry	21	21
(Hong Kong) Lau CY (Hong Kong) Poon LY	13	16
(Chinese Taipei) Cheng P-H (Chinese Taipei) Chiang P-H	21	21
(Macau) Ip TF (Macau) Lao IM	21	21
(Pakistan) M Ali (Pakistan) S Khan	19	19
(Malaysia) Goh VS (Malaysia) S Saniru	21	21
(Russia) V Pivchenkov (Russia) A Panushkina	14	11

Second round
(South Africa) R Abrahams (South Africa) J Fry	17	9
(Chinese Taipei) Cheng P-H (Chinese Taipei) Chiang P-H	21	21
(Germany) S Rduch (Germany) M Reich	21	24
9/16	(Russia) G Kosenko (Russia) V Yushkova	19	22
(Macau) Ip TF (Macau) Lao IM	5	11
(Malaysia) Goh VS (Malaysia) S Saniru	21	21
(Czech Republic) O Kopriva (Czech Republic) D Koukalova	20	21	19
5/8	(Australia) B Ma (Australia) V Na	22	15	21

Third round
(Chinese Taipei) Cheng P-H (Chinese Taipei) Chiang P-H	21	21
(Germany) S Rduch (Germany) M Reich	15	11
(Malaysia) Goh VS (Malaysia) S Saniru	21	21
5/8	(Australia) B Ma (Australia) V Na	8	9

Fourth round
(Chinese Taipei) Cheng P-H (Chinese Taipei) Chiang P-H	10	14
(Malaysia) Goh VS (Malaysia) S Saniru	21	21

=== Section 6 ===
First round
(Denmark) C Skovgaard (Denmark) M Tharbeerg	21	21
(Bulgaria) B Andreev (Bulgaria) G Banova	14	12
(Ukraine) D Zavadsky (Ukraine) M Martynenko	21	21
(Singapore) Thng BS (Singapore) J Poo	8	15
(Netherlands) L Oey (Netherlands) S Barning	21	21
(United States) J Shu (United States) P Lun	12	15

Second round
(Denmark) C Skovgaard (Denmark) M Tharbeerg	21	21
(Ukraine) D Zavadsky (Ukraine) M Martynenko	13	18
(Vietnam) Nguyen QT (Vietnam) Vu TT	13	21	7
9/16	(New Zealand) H Tam (New Zealand) D Barry	21	16	21
(Netherlands) L Oey (Netherlands) S Barning	21	21
(Japan) K Itani (Japan) R Kakiiwa	12	12
(Canada) A Cheong (Canada) A Man	9	6
3/4	(China) Hu WQ (China) Wang XL	21	21

Third round
(Denmark) C Skovgaard (Denmark) M Tharbeerg	22	21
9/16	(New Zealand) H Tam (New Zealand) D Barry	20	9
(Netherlands) L Oey (Netherlands) S Barning	21	18	20
3/4	(China) Hu WQ (China) Wang XL	15	21	22

Fourth round
(Denmark) C Skovgaard (Denmark) M Tharbeerg	21	20	11
3/4	(China) Hu WQ (China) Wang XL	14	22	21

=== Section 7 ===
First round
(Hong Kong) K Cai (Hong Kong) Tse YS
(New Zealand) J Eunson (New Zealand) V Copeland	WO
(England) P Mills (England) M Agathangelou	25	21
(Bulgaria) T Hadzhiev (Bulgaria) R Ivanova	23	12
(Egypt) R Ibrahim (Egypt) N El Bana	8	4
(New Zealand) E Haggo (New Zealand) J Jonggowisastro	21	21

Second round
(Hong Kong) K Cai (Hong Kong) Tse YS	14	11
(England) P Mills (England) M Agathangelou	21	21
(Singapore) J Tang (Singapore) S Sari	21	21
9/16	(United States) E Pun (United States) L Todt	3	8
(New Zealand) E Haggo (New Zealand) J Jonggowisastro	13	13
(Sweden) H Fahlstrom (Sweden) A Hogstrom	21	21
(Germany) F Hammes (Germany) L Deichgraeber	10	19
5/8	(Indonesia) V Okvana (Indonesia) R Dili	21	21

Third round
(England) P Mills (England) M Agathangelou	18	20
(Singapore) J Tang (Singapore) S Sari	21	22
(Sweden) H Fahlstrom (Sweden) A Hogstrom	20	21	10
5/8	(Indonesia) V Okvana (Indonesia) R Dili	22	17	21

Fourth round
(Singapore) J Tang (Singapore) S Sari	12	10
5/8	(Indonesia) V Okvana (Indonesia) R Dili	21	21

=== Section 8 ===
First round
(India) S Nandaluri (India) A Ponnappa	15	16
(China) Li T (China) Ma J	21	21
(Japan) S Wada (Japan) E Tamaki	18	17
(Chinese Taipei) Hsiao H-C (Chinese Taipei) Lee T-A	21	21
(Australia) S Gunaratne (Australia) A Slee	11	4
(South Korea) Lee J-H (South Korea) Sun I-J	21	21

Second round
(China) Li T (China) Ma J	21	21
(Chinese Taipei) Hsiao H-C (Chinese Taipei) Lee T-A	16	14
(Germany) P Kaesbauer (Germany) J Schmidt	18	16
9/16	(South Korea) Cho G-W (South Korea) Hong S-J	21	21
(South Korea) Lee J-H (South Korea) Sun I-J
(Sri Lanka) G Jayawardena (Sri Lanka) L Lokugamhewa	WO
(Chinese Taipei) Chen P-M (Chinese Taipei) Tung H-C	23	13	16
2	(Malaysia) Tan WK (Malaysia) Woon KW	21	21	21

Third round
(China) Li T (China) Ma J	21	23
9/16	(South Korea) Cho G-W (South Korea) Hong S-J	15	21
(South Korea) Lee J-H (South Korea) Sun I-J	17	14
2	(Malaysia) Tan WK (Malaysia) Woon KW	21	21

Fourth round
(China) Li T (China) Ma J	21	21
2	(Malaysia) Tan WK (Malaysia) Woon KW	9	19
