= 2007 BWF World Junior Championships – girls' doubles =

2007 BWF World Junior Championships girls' doubles
Tournament details
- Dates: 30 October 2007 – 4 November 2007
- Edition: 9th
- Level: International
- Venue: Waitakere Trusts Stadium
- Location: Waitakere City, New Zealand

The girls' doubles event for the 2007 BWF World Junior Championships was held between 30 October and 4 November. Xie Jing and Zhong Qianxin of China won the title.

== Seeded ==
1. (Indonesia) Richi Puspita Dili / Debby Susanto (quarter-final)
2. (South Korea) Yoo Hyun-Young / Jung Kyung-Eun (final)
3. (Singapore) Gu Juan / Zhang Beiwen (second round)
4. (Singapore) Yao Lei / Fu Mingtian (third round)
5. (Japan) Shizuka Uchida / Ayane Kurihara (third round)
6. (South Korea) Lee Se-Rang / Eom Hye-Won (second round)
7. (England) Samantha Ward / Gabrielle White (quarter-final)
8. (Denmark) Anne Skelbaek / Maria Helsbol (second round)

== Draw ==
=== Finals ===
Semifinals
(China) Xie Jing (China) Zhong Qianxin	19	21	21
(Chinese Taipei) Tien Ching-Yung (Chinese Taipei) Chiang Kai-Hsin	21	14	4
(Malaysia) Ng Hui Lin (Malaysia) Goh Liu Ying	11	12
2	(South Korea) Yoo Hyun-Young (South Korea) Jung Kyung-Eun	21	21

Final
(China) Xie Jing (China) Zhong Qianxin	21	10	21
2	(South Korea) Yoo Hyun-Young (South Korea) Jung Kyung-Eun	18	21	15

==== Section 1 ====
First round
(England) S Walker (England) P Riou	23	15	21
(Russia) K Polikarpova (Russia) V Ushkova	21	21	17
(South Africa) J Fry (South Africa) D Godfrey	4	4
(China) Xie J (China) Zhong QX	21	21
(Thailand) P Wangpaiboonkj (Thailand) R Chuthabunditkul	21	21
(Puerto Rico) I Gonzalez (Puerto Rico) D Santana	5	11

Second round
1	(Indonesia) R Dili (Indonesia) D Susanto	21	21
(Germany) D Kaufhold (Germany) L Deichgraeber	13	19
(Philippines) M Yupangco (Philippines) C Lizardo	9	8
(England) S Walker (England) P Riou	21	21
8	(Denmark) A Skelbaek (Denmark) M Helsbol	19	21	20
(Malaysia) Woon KW (Malaysia) Tee JY	21	18	22
(China) Xie J (China) Zhong QX	21	21
(Thailand) P Wangpaiboonkj (Thailand) R Chuthabunditkul	15	14

Third round
1	(Indonesia) R Dili (Indonesia) D Susanto	21	18	21
(England) S Walker (England) P Riou	17	21	9
(Malaysia) Woon KW (Malaysia) Tee JY	11	18
(China) Xie J (China) Zhong QX	21	21

Quarterfinal
1	(Indonesia) R Dili (Indonesia) D Susanto	20	21
(China) Xie J (China) Zhong QX	22	23

==== Section 2 ====
First round
(New Zealand) S Cheng (New Zealand) E Chapple	17	18
(India) S Reddy (India) P Thulasi	21	21
(Vietnam) Nguyen TNT (Vietnam) Nguyen THA	21	21
(Bulgaria) P Neykova (Mexico) D Angulo	17	15
(Czech Republic) E Maixnerova (Czech Republic) S Krizkova	23	13	16
(Hong Kong) Tung YH (Hong Kong) Poon LY	21	21	21

Second round
3	(Singapore) Gu J (Singapore) Zhang BW	16	21	23
(Chinese Taipei) Tien C-Y (Chinese Taipei) Chiang K-H	21	18	25
(Turkey) O Caliskan (Turkey) R Kemer	15	12
(India) S Reddy (India) P Thulasi	21	21
6	(South Korea) Lee S-R (South Korea) Eom H-W	16	21	20
(Japan) A Murakami (Japan) M Sakurai	21	13	22
(Vietnam) Nguyen TNT (Vietnam) Nguyen THA	6	16
(Hong Kong) Tung YH (Hong Kong) Poon LY	21	21

Third round
(Chinese Taipei) Tien C-Y (Chinese Taipei) Chiang K-H	21	21
(India) S Reddy (India) P Thulasi	14	16
(Japan) A Murakami (Japan) M Sakurai	21	21
(Hong Kong) Tung YH (Hong Kong) Poon LY	9	12

Quarterfinal
(Chinese Taipei) Tien C-Y (Chinese Taipei) Chiang K-H	8	21	21
(Japan) A Murakami (Japan) M Sakurai	21	16	13

==== Section 3 ====
First round
(Mongolia) U Turtogtokh (Mongolia) D Soronzonbold	WO
(Scotland) G Sloan (Scotland) L Sloan
(Germany) F Deprez (Germany) C Nelte	22	18
(Hong Kong) Chan TK (Hong Kong) Tse YS	24	21
(Philippines) K Velez (Philippines) J Paredes	22	21
(Australia) V Na (Australia) L Choo	20	14
(Malaysia) Ng HL (Malaysia) Goh LY	21	21
(United States) C Chow (Puerto Rico) K Gonzalez	12	9

Second round
(Scotland) G Sloan (Scotland) L Sloan	16	15
(Hong Kong) Chan TK (Hong Kong) Tse YS	21	21
(Chinese Taipei) Peng H-C (Chinese Taipei) Cheng W-H	21	7	19
7	(England) S Ward (England) G White	13	21	21
(Philippines) K Velez (Philippines) J Paredes	10	12
(Malaysia) Ng HL (Malaysia) Goh LY	21	21
(Thailand) P Buranaprasertsuk (Thailand) S Taerattanachai	16	21	20
4	(Singapore) Yao L (Singapore) Fu MT	21	18	22

Third round
(Hong Kong) Chan TK (Hong Kong) Tse YS	21	16	18
7	(England) S Ward (England) G White	15	21	21
(Malaysia) Ng HL (Malaysia) Goh LY	21	19	21
4	(Singapore) Yao L (Singapore) Fu MT	12	21	15

Quarterfinal
7	(England) S Ward (England) G White	10	10
(Malaysia) Ng HL (Malaysia) Goh LY	21	21

==== Section 4 ====
First round
(India) A Ponnappa (India) N Sosale	18	22
(Indonesia) R Hendarni (Indonesia) Krishabella	21	24
(New Zealand) E Ang (New Zealand) K Gregory	21	22
(United States) I Zhong (United States) B Neumann	15	20
(China) Wang XL (China) Li XR	21	21
(Sweden) A Hogstrom (Sweden) J Carlsson	3	11

Second round
(Indonesia) R Hendarni (Indonesia) Krishabella	21	21
(New Zealand) E Ang (New Zealand) K Gregory	9	7
(Bulgaria) D Popstoykova (Bulgaria) B Maneva	13	14
5	(Japan) S Uchida (Japan) A Kurihara	21	21
(China) Wang XL (China) Li XR	21	21
(Netherlands) P Stolzenbach (Netherlands) Wong YM	9	14
(Kyrgyzstan) D Zvereva (Kyrgyzstan) I Kuligina	WO
2	(South Korea) Yoo H-Y (South Korea) Jung K-E

Third round
(Indonesia) R Hendarni (Indonesia) Krishabella	17	22	21
5	(Japan) S Uchida (Japan) A Kurihara	21	20	16
(China) Wang XL (China) Li XR	20	15
2	(South Korea) Yoo H-Y (South Korea) Jung K-E	22	21

Quarterfinal
(Indonesia) R Hendarni (Indonesia) Krishabella	10	6
2	(South Korea) Yoo H-Y (South Korea) Jung K-E	21	21
