= 2012 Swiss Open Grand Prix Gold =

Tournament details
- Dates: March 13, 2012 - March 18, 2012
- Total prize money: US$125,000
- Venue: St. Jakobshalle
- Location: Basel, Switzerland

Champions
- Men's singles: (China) Chen Jin
- Women's singles: (India) Saina Nehwal
- Men's doubles: (Japan) Naoki Kawamae (Japan) Shoji Sato
- Women's doubles: (China) Xia Huan (China) Tang Jinhua
- Mixed doubles: (Indonesia) Tontowi Ahmad (Indonesia) Liliyana Natsir

The 2012 Swiss Open Grand Prix Gold in badminton was the second grand prix gold and grand prix tournament of the 2012 BWF Grand Prix Gold and Grand Prix. The tournament was held in St. Jakobshalle, Basel, Switzerland from March 13 until March 18, 2012 and had a total purse of $125,000.

== Men's singles ==
=== Seeds ===
1. (Malaysia) Lee Chong Wei (withdrew)
2. (China) Chen Long (semi-final)
3. (Denmark) Peter Gade (second round)
4. (China) Chen Jin (champion)
5. (South Korea) Lee Hyun-Il (final)
6. (Japan) Kenichi Tago (withdrew)
7. (Vietnam) Nguyen Tien Minh (third round)
8. (China) Du Pengyu (third round)
9. (Indonesia) Simon Santoso (withdrew)
10. (Indonesia) Taufik Hidayat (semi-final)
11. (Denmark) Jan Ø. Jørgensen (third round)
12. (Germany) Marc Zwiebler (withdrew)
13. (South Korea) Shon Wan-Ho (quarter-final)
14. (Denmark) Hans-Kristian Vittinghus (quarter-final)
15. (Indonesia) Tommy Sugiarto (second round)
16. (Thailand) Boonsak Ponsana (second round)

=== Finals ===
Quarterfinals
13	(South Korea) Shon Wan-Ho	14	21	19
10	(Indonesia) Taufik Hidayat	21	10	21
4	(China) Chen Jin	21	23
(Malaysia) Daren Liew	8	21
5	(South Korea) Lee Hyun-Il	21	21
(Denmark) Viktor Axelsen	15	14
14	(Denmark) Hans-Kristian Vittinghus	14	14
2	(China) Chen Long	21	21

Semifinals
10	(Indonesia) Taufik Hidayat	11	18
4	(China) Chen Jin	21	21
5	(South Korea) Lee Hyun-Il	21	21
2	(China) Chen Long	14	19

Final
4	(China) Chen Jin	14	21	21
5	(South Korea) Lee Hyun-Il	21	9	17

=== Top half ===
==== Section 1 ====
First Round
PFR	(Malaysia) Z Zulkiffli	21	21
(Belgium) Y Tan	14	13
PFR	(Bulgaria) S Makarski	22	21
(Peru) R Pacheco	20	9
13	(South Korea) Shon W-H	21	21
(Denmark) E Holst	10	10
(Hong Kong) Wong WK	20	22	19
(India) S Varma	22	20	21

Second Round
PFR	(Malaysia) Z Zulkiffli	22	20	17
PFR	(Bulgaria) S Makarski	20	22	21
13	(South Korea) Shon W-H	21	21
(India) S Varma	10	9

Third Round
PFR	(Bulgaria) S Makarski	11	11
13	(South Korea) Shon W-H	21	21

==== Section 2 ====
First Round
8	(China) Du PY	20	21	21
PFR	(Italy) I Ade Chandra	22	11	11
(Denmark) C Thomsen	21	21
PFR	(Switzerland) H Shaharudin	8	9
10	(Indonesia) T Hidayat	21	17	21
(Singapore) D Wong	14	21	19
(Czech Republic) J Frohlich	18	13
(Sweden) H Hurskainen	21	21

Second Round
8	(China) Du PY	21	21
(Denmark) C Thomsen	11	14
10	(Indonesia) T Hidayat	17	21	21
(Sweden) H Hurskainen	21	12	16

Third Round
8	(China) Du PY	18	15
10	(Indonesia) T Hidayat	21	21

==== Section 3 ====
First Round
4	(China) Chen J	21	26
(India) R Gurusaidutt	11	24
(Russia) V Malkov	19	16
(Indonesia) A Tedjono	21	21
11	(Denmark) J Jørgensen	20	21	21
(Thailand) T Saensomboonsuk	22	8	9
(India) A Bhat	21	16	14
(Ukraine) D Zavadsky	10	21	21

Second Round
4	(China) Chen J	21	21
(Indonesia) A Tedjono	13	10
11	(Denmark) J Jørgensen	21	21
(Ukraine) D Zavadsky	15	10

Third Round
4	(China) Chen J	21	21
11	(Denmark) J Jørgensen	13	17

==== Section 4 ====
First Round
PFR	(France) S Bourbon	15	7
(Chinese Taipei) Hsu J-H	21	21
(France) B Leverdez	20	13
(Malaysia) D Liew	22	21
PFR	(United States) B Seguin	10	12
(Portugal) P Martins	21	21
PFR	(Switzerland) L Nussbaumer	9	12
(India) A Jayaram	21	21

Second Round
(Chinese Taipei) Hsu J-H	19	8
(Malaysia) D Liew	21	21
(Portugal) P Martins	21	21
(India) A Jayaram	16	16

Third Round
(Malaysia) D Liew	19	21	21
(Portugal) P Martins	21	13	10

=== Bottom half ===
==== Section 5 ====
First Round
(Chinese Taipei) Hsueh H-Y	21	21
PFR	(Switzerland) C Heiniger	12	4
(Germany) A Roovers	13	8
16	(Thailand) B Ponsana	21	21
(Germany) D Domke	21	21
PFR	(Switzerland) N Blondel	10	12
(Indonesia) S Kuncoro	13	12
5	(South Korea) Lee H-I	21	21

Second Round
(Chinese Taipei) Hsueh H-Y	14	21	21
16	(Thailand) B Ponsana	21	17	13
(Germany) D Domke	12	14
5	(South Korea) Lee H-I	21	21

Third Round
(Chinese Taipei) Hsueh H-Y	15	10
5	(South Korea) Lee H-I	21	21

==== Section 6 ====
First Round
(Denmark) V Axelsen	22	21
(Chinese Taipei) Chou T-C	20	16
(Ukraine) V Atrashchenkov	11	21	16
15	(Indonesia) T Sugiarto	21	13	21
(Japan) K Sakai	21	21
(Hong Kong) Hu Y	15	17
(Netherlands) E Pang	15	15
3	(Denmark) P Gade	21	21

Second Round
(Denmark) V Axelsen	21	21
15	(Indonesia) T Sugiarto	18	12
(Japan) K Sakai
3	(Denmark) P Gade	wo

Third Round
(Denmark) V Axelsen	21	21
(Japan) K Sakai	9	16

==== Section 7 ====
First Round
(Thailand) S Avihingsanon	21	22
(Uganda) E Ekiring	14	20
(Czech Republic) P Koukal	12	21	14
14	(Denmark) H Vittinghus	21	11	21
(Russia) S Pukhov	9	10
(India) K Parupalli	21	21
(Poland) P Wacha	9^{r}
7	(Vietnam) Nguyen TM	17

Second Round
(Thailand) S Avihingsanon	4	16
14	(Denmark) H Vittinghus	21	21
(India) K Parupalli	13	18
7	(Vietnam) Nguyen TM	21	21

Third Round
14	(Denmark) H Vittinghus	21	21
7	(Vietnam) Nguyen TM	11	17

==== Section 8 ====
First Round
(Iran) K Mehrabi	20	16
PFR	(France) Y Turlan	22	21
(Japan) T Ueda	21	21
PFR	(Switzerland) A Dumartheray	13	16
(Italy) W Putro	10	21	21
WC	(Switzerland) C Bösiger	21	15	17
PFR	(South Korea) Hong J-H	18	10
2	(China) Chen L	21	21

Second Round
PFR	(France) Y Turlan	16	11
(Japan) T Ueda	21	21
(Italy) W Putro	5	7
2	(China) Chen L	21	21

Third Round
(Japan) T Ueda	19	17
2	(China) Chen L	21	21

== Women's singles ==
=== Seeds ===
1. (China) Wang Yihan (second round)
2. (China) Wang Shixian (final)
3. (India) Saina Nehwal (champion)
4. (China) Jiang Yanjiao (second round)
5. (Germany) Juliane Schenk (quarter-final)
6. (China) Liu Xin (quarter-final)
7. (Chinese Taipei) Cheng Shao-Chieh (second round)
8. (Thailand) Ratchanok Inthanon (semi-final)

=== Finals ===
Semifinals
PFQ	(Japan) Minatsu Mitani	16	18
3	(India) Saina Nehwal	21	21
8	(Thailand) Ratchanok Inthanon	17	15
2	(China) Wang Shixian	21	21

Final
3	(India) Saina Nehwal	21	21
2	(China) Wang Shixian	19	16

=== Top half ===
==== Section 1 ====
First Round
1	(China) Wang YH	19	21	21
PFQ	(Indonesia) A Firdasari	21	15	16
PFQ	(Japan) M Mitani	13	21	21
Q4	(Hong Kong) Tse YS	21	15	17
7	(Chinese Taipei) Cheng S-C	21	21
Q3	(United States) R Wang	14	11
(South Korea) Bae Y-J	21	21
(Chinese Taipei) Pai H-M	17	13

Second Round
1	(China) Wang YH	wo
PFQ	(Japan) M Mitani
7	(Chinese Taipei) Cheng S-C	7	12
(South Korea) Bae Y-J	21	21

Quarterfinals
PFQ	(Japan) M Mitani	21	21
(South Korea) Bae Y-J	12	16

==== Section 2 ====
First Round
3	(India) S Nehwal	21	21
(Japan) S Sato	13	8
(Thailand) P Buranaprasertsuk	22	14	11
Q1	(Netherlands) J Meulendijks	20	21	21
6	(China) Liu X	21	21
(Ukraine) L Griga	14	7
(Bulgaria) P Nedelcheva	15	15
(Singapore) Gu J	21	21

Second Round
3	(India) S Nehwal	19	21	21
Q1	(Netherlands) J Meulendijks	21	10	6
6	(China) Liu X	21	18	21
(Singapore) Gu J	14	21	18

Quarterfinals
3	(India) S Nehwal	21	21
6	(China) Liu X	12	13

=== Bottom half ===
==== Section 3 ====
First Round
(Netherlands) Yao J	21	18	21
(India) P Sindhu	18	21	19
(Hong Kong) Yip PY	15	19
8	(Thailand) R Inthanon	21	21
(South Korea) Sung J-H	21	21
(Japan) A Goto	19	10
WC	(Switzerland) J Cicognini	8	14
4	(China) Jiang YJ	21	21

Second Round
(Netherlands) Yao J	17	10
8	(Thailand) R Inthanon	21	21
(South Korea) Sung J-H
4	(China) Jiang YJ	wo

Quarterfinals
8	(Thailand) R Inthanon	21	14	22
(South Korea) Sung J-H	14	21	20

==== Section 4 ====
First Round
(Japan) E Hirose	21	21
Q2	(Thailand) S Taerattanachai	18	16
(Canada) M Li	15	13
5	(Germany) J Schenk	21	21
(Bulgaria) L Zechiri	10	15
(Singapore) Fu MT	21	21
(Chinese Taipei) Tai T-Y	12	14
2	(China) Wang SX	21	21

Second Round
(Japan) E Hirose	21	12	14
5	(Germany) J Schenk	8	21	21
(Singapore) Fu MT	9	13
2	(China) Wang SX	21	21

Quarterfinals
5	(Germany) J Schenk	14	10
2	(China) Wang SX	21	21

== Men's doubles ==
=== Seeds ===
1. (China) Chai Biao / Guo Zhendong (second round)
2. (Indonesia) Mohammad Ahsan / Bona Septano (withdrew)
3. (Japan) Hirokatsu Hashimoto / Noriyasu Hirata (quarter-final)
4. (Indonesia) Markis Kido / Hendra Setiawan (second round)
5. (Indonesia) Alvent Yulianto / Hendra Aprida Gunawan (semi-final)
6. (Japan) Naoki Kawamae / Shoji Sato (champion)
7. (Chinese Taipei) Fang Chieh-Min / Lee Sheng-Mu (final)
8. (Japan) Hiroyuki Endo / Kenichi Hayakawa (semi-final)

=== Finals ===
Semifinals
5	(Indonesia) Alvent Yulianto (Indonesia) Hendra Aprida Gunawan	18	17
6	(Japan) Naoki Kawamae (Japan) Shoji Sato	21	21
7	(Chinese Taipei) Fang Chieh-Min (Chinese Taipei) Lee Sheng-Mu	21	23
8	(Japan) Hiroyuki Endo (Japan) Kenichi Hayakawa	15	21

Final
6	(Japan) Naoki Kawamae (Japan) Shoji Sato	21	21
7	(Chinese Taipei) Fang Chieh-Min (Chinese Taipei) Lee Sheng-Mu	13	14

=== Top half ===
==== Section 1 ====
First Round
1	(China) Chai B (China) Guo ZD	21	21
(Russia) V Durkin (Russia) A Nikolaenko	18	14
Q2	(Malaysia) Goh VS (Malaysia) Teo KS	21	21
(Germany) I Kindervater (Germany) J Schoettler	16	17
5	(Indonesia) A Yulianto (Indonesia) H Gunawan	21	21
WC	(Switzerland) R Schmid (Switzerland) G Tripet	11	13
(Netherlands) R Bosch (Netherlands) K Ridder	18	21	22
(India) R Kumar (India) S Thomas	21	19	24

Second Round
1	(China) Chai B (China) Guo ZD	17	18
Q2	(Malaysia) Goh VS (Malaysia) Teo KS	21	21
5	(Indonesia) A Yulianto (Indonesia) H Gunawan	21	11	21
(India) R Kumar (India) S Thomas	16	21	14

Quarterfinals
Q2	(Malaysia) Goh VS (Malaysia) Teo KS	15	21	12
5	(Indonesia) A Yulianto (Indonesia) H Gunawan	21	12	21

==== Section 2 ====
First Round
4	(Indonesia) M Kido (Indonesia) H Setiawan	22	21
(Malaysia) Gan TC (Malaysia) Tan BS	20	18
(Chinese Taipei) Chen H-L (Chinese Taipei) Lin Y-L	16	21	21
(Thailand) B Issara (Thailand) M Jongjit	21	15	15
6	(Japan) N Kawamae (Japan) S Sato	12	24	23
(Denmark) M Conrad-Petersen (Denmark) J Rasmussen	21	22	21
Q3	(Denmark) C Skovgaard (Denmark) M Kolding	21	21
(England) C Adcock (England) A Ellis	17	13

Second Round
4	(Indonesia) M Kido (Indonesia) H Setiawan	12	20
(Chinese Taipei) Chen H-L (Chinese Taipei) Lin Y-L	21	22
6	(Japan) N Kawamae (Japan) S Sato	21	21
Q3	(Denmark) C Skovgaard (Denmark) M Kolding	15	14

Quarterfinals
(Chinese Taipei) Chen H-L (Chinese Taipei) Lin Y-L	7	13
6	(Japan) N Kawamae (Japan) S Sato	21	21

=== Bottom half ===
==== Section 3 ====
First Round
(Denmark) R Bonde (Denmark) A Kristiansen	3
(South Korea) Kim K-J (South Korea) Kim S-R	2^{r}
(Poland) A Cwalina (Poland) M Logosz	19	15
7	(Chinese Taipei) Fang C-M (Chinese Taipei) Lee S-M	21	21
(Indonesia) A Pratama (Indonesia) R Saputro	21	16	21
(China) Liu XL (China) Qiu ZH	16	21	18
(Germany) M Fuchs (Germany) O Roth	21	8	19
3	(Japan) H Hashimoto (Japan) N Hirata	16	21	21

Second Round
(Denmark) R Bonde (Denmark) A Kristiansen	19	14
7	(Chinese Taipei) Fang C-M (Chinese Taipei) Lee S-M	21	21
(Indonesia) A Pratama (Indonesia) R Saputro	19	21	15
3	(Japan) H Hashimoto (Japan) N Hirata	21	14	21

Quarterfinals
7	(Chinese Taipei) Fang C-M (Chinese Taipei) Lee S-M	13	21	21
3	(Japan) H Hashimoto (Japan) N Hirata	21	13	15

==== Section 4 ====
First Round
Q4	(Singapore) D Chrisnanta (Singapore) C Triyachart	21	21
Q1	(France) R Labar (France) M Quere	9	15
(Thailand) S Anugritayawon (Thailand) S Prapakamol	14	18
8	(Japan) H Endo (Japan) K Hayakawa	21	21
(China) Hong W (China) Shen Y	21	21
PFQ	(Germany) P Kaesbauer (Germany) J Zurwonne	17	7
(Austria) J Koch (Austria) P Zauner	21	21
PFQ	(Vietnam) Bui BD (Vietnam) Dao MT	9	18

Second Round
Q4	(Singapore) D Chrisnanta (Singapore) C Triyachart	18	15
8	(Japan) H Endo (Japan) K Hayakawa	21	21
(China) Hong W (China) Shen Y	20	21	21
(Austria) J Koch (Austria) P Zauner	22	11	15

Quarterfinals
8	(Japan) H Endo (Japan) K Hayakawa	16	21	22
(China) Hong W (China) Shen Y	21	19	20

== Women's doubles ==
=== Seeds ===
1. (South Korea) Ha Jung-Eun / Kim Min-Jung (semi-final)
2. (Japan) Mizuki Fujii / Reika Kakiiwa (quarter-final)
3. (Japan) Shizuka Matsuo / Mami Naito (quarter-final)
4. (Japan) Miyuki Maeda / Satoko Suetsuna (first round)
5. (Denmark) Christinna Pedersen / Kamilla Rytter Juhl (quarter-final)
6. (China) Bao Yixin / Zhong Qianxin (final)
7. (Chinese Taipei) Cheng Wen-Hsing / Chien Yu-Chin (quarter-final)
8. (Indonesia) Meiliana Jauhari / Greysia Polii (second round)

=== Finals ===
Semifinals
1	(South Korea) Ha Jung-Eun (South Korea) Kim Min-Jung	21	19
6	(China) Bao Yixin (China) Zhong Qianxin	23	21
(Malaysia) Wong Pei Tty (Malaysia) Chin Eei Hui	12	11
(China) Xia Huan (China) Tang Jinhua	21	21

Final
6	(China) Bao Yixin (China) Zhong Qianxin	17	10
(China) Xia Huan (China) Tang Jinhua	21	21

=== Top half ===
==== Section 1 ====
First Round
1	(South Korea) Ha J-E (South Korea) Kim M-J	21	21
(Singapore) S Sari (Singapore) Yao L	16	17
WC	(Switzerland) M Gruber (Switzerland) S Herzig	11	12
Q3	(Malaysia) Ng HE (Malaysia) Ng HL	21	21
7	(Chinese Taipei) Cheng W-H (Chinese Taipei) Chien Y-C	21	21
(Russia) V Sorokina (Russia) N Vislova	19	9
(Canada) A Bruce (Canada) M Li	11	14
(Indonesia) V Marissa (Indonesia) N Melati	21	21

Second Round
1	(South Korea) Ha J-E (South Korea) Kim M-J	21	21
Q3	(Malaysia) Ng HE (Malaysia) Ng HL	4	10
7	(Chinese Taipei) Cheng W-H (Chinese Taipei) Chien Y-C	16	21	21
(Indonesia) V Marissa (Indonesia) N Melati	21	16	14

Quarterfinals
1	(South Korea) Ha J-E (South Korea) Kim M-J	29	21	21
7	(Chinese Taipei) Cheng W-H (Chinese Taipei) Chien Y-C	30	19	12

==== Section 2 ====
First Round
3	(Japan) S Matsuo (Japan) M Naito	16	21	21
(India) J Gutta (India) A Ponnappa	21	18	10
(Japan) M Matsutomo (Japan) A Takahashi	23	21
(Malaysia) V Hoo (Malaysia) Woon KW	21	9
6	(China) Bao YX (China) Zhong QX	21	21
Q1	(United States) I Wang (United States) R Wang	14	12
(South Korea) Eom H-W (South Korea) Jang Y-N	21	21
(Denmark) L Kruse (Denmark) M Roepke	18	16

Second Round
3	(Japan) S Matsuo (Japan) M Naito	21	21
(Japan) M Matsutomo (Japan) A Takahashi	7	19
6	(China) Bao YX (China) Zhong QX	20	21	25
(South Korea) Eom H-W (South Korea) Jang Y-N	22	15	23

Quarterfinals
3	(Japan) S Matsuo (Japan) M Naito	21	19	17
6	(China) Bao YX (China) Zhong QX	19	21	21

=== Bottom half ===
==== Section 3 ====
First Round
(Indonesia) A Agustin (Indonesia) N Maheswari	17	11
(South Korea) Jung K-E (South Korea) Kim H-N	21	21
(Hong Kong) Poon LY (Hong Kong) Tse YS	12	21	20
5	(Denmark) C Pedersen (Denmark) K Juhl	21	19	22
(Malaysia) Wong PT (Malaysia) Chin EH	15	21	21
Q4	(South Korea) Choi H-I (South Korea) Kim S-Y	21	18	16
(Thailand) D Aroonkesorn (Thailand) K Voravichitchaikul	22	21
4	(Japan) M Maeda (Japan) S Suetsuna	20	16

Second Round
(South Korea) Jung K-E (South Korea) Kim H-N	21	16	15
5	(Denmark) C Pedersen (Denmark) K Juhl	19	21	21
(Malaysia) Wong PT (Malaysia) Chin EH	21	10	23
(Thailand) D Aroonkesorn (Thailand) K Voravichitchaikul	10	21	21

Quarterfinals
5	(Denmark) C Pedersen (Denmark) K Juhl	18	21	7
(Malaysia) Wong PT (Malaysia) Chin EH	21	15	21

==== Section 4 ====
First Round
(China) Xia H (China) Tang JH	21	21
(Germany) S Marinello (Germany) B Michels	15	16
(England) M Agathangelou (England) H Olver	16	16
8	(Indonesia) M Jauhari (Indonesia) G Polii	21	21
(Netherlands) L Jonathans (Netherlands) P van Dooremalen	21	21
(Canada) N Grether (Canada) C Reid	15	18
Q2	(Chinese Taipei) Hsieh P-C (Chinese Taipei) Wang P-R	19	18
2	(Japan) M Fujii (Japan) R Kakiiwa	21	21

Second Round
(China) Xia H (China) Tang JH	21	24
8	(Indonesia) M Jauhari (Indonesia) G Polii	12	22
(Netherlands) L Jonathans (Netherlands) P van Dooremalen	8	12
2	(Japan) M Fujii (Japan) R Kakiiwa	21	21

Quarterfinals
(China) Xia H (China) Tang JH	21	21
2	(Japan) M Fujii (Japan) R Kakiiwa	15	14

== Mixed doubles ==
=== Seeds ===
1. (Indonesia) Tontowi Ahmad / Lilyana Natsir (champion)
2. (Chinese Taipei) Chen Hung-Ling / Cheng Wen-Hsing (quarter-final)
3. (Thailand) Sudket Prapakamol / Saralee Thoungthongkam (final)
4. (Denmark) Thomas Laybourn / Kamilla Rytter Juhl (withdrew)
5. (Malaysia) Chan Peng Soon / Goh Liu Ying (quarter-final)
6. (Thailand) Songphon Anugritayawon / Kunchala Voravichitchaikul (second round)
7. (Germany) Michael Fuchs / Birgit Michels (first round)
8. (India) Valiyaveetil Diju / Jwala Gutta (first round)

=== Finals ===
Semifinals
1	(Indonesia) Tontowi Ahmad (Indonesia) Lilyana Natsir	21	16	21
(England) Chris Adcock (Scotland) Imogen Bankier	15	21	13
3	(Thailand) Sudket Prapakamol (Thailand) Saralee Thoungthongkam	21	21
(China) He Hanbin (China) Bao Yixin	18	14

Final
1	(Indonesia) Tontowi Ahmad (Indonesia) Lilyana Natsir	21	21
3	(Thailand) Sudket Prapakamol (Thailand) Saralee Thoungthongkam	16	14

=== Top half ===
==== Section 1 ====
First Round
1	(Indonesia) T Ahmad (Indonesia) L Natsir	21	21
(Germany) J Schoettler (Germany) S Marinello	11	10
Q4	(Denmark) A Kristiansen (Denmark) L Kruse	21	21
(Switzerland) A Dumartheray (Switzerland) S Jaquet	10	9
5	(Malaysia) Chan PS (Malaysia) Goh LY	21	21
(Ukraine) V Atrashchenkov (Ukraine) A Kobceva	16	19
(Germany) P Kaesbauer (Germany) J Goliszewski	8	21	21
(Singapore) D Chrisnanta (Singapore) V Neo	21	18	14

Second Round
1	(Indonesia) T Ahmad (Indonesia) L Natsir	21	20	21
Q4	(Denmark) A Kristiansen (Denmark) L Kruse	15	22	14
5	(Malaysia) Chan PS (Malaysia) Goh LY	21	24
(Germany) P Kaesbauer (Germany) J Goliszewski	16	22

Quarterfinals
1	(Indonesia) T Ahmad (Indonesia) L Natsir	21	18	25
5	(Malaysia) Chan PS (Malaysia) Goh LY	19	21	23

==== Section 2 ====
First Round
PFQ	(France) B Careme (France) A Fontaine	16	13
(England) C Adcock (Scotland) I Bankier	21	21
(England) N Robertson (England) J Wallwork	21	21
(Bulgaria) S Makarski (Bulgaria) D Dimova	15	18
6	(Thailand) S Anugritayawon (Thailand) K Voravichitchaikul	19	21	21
Q3	(China) Qiu ZH (China) Tang JH	21	16	12
(Japan) K Hayakawa (Japan) M Matsutomo	21	17	21
(Russia) A Nikolaenko (Russia) V Sorokina	14	21	13

Second Round
(England) C Adcock (Scotland) I Bankier	19	21	25
(England) N Robertson (England) J Wallwork	21	11	23
6	(Thailand) S Anugritayawon (Thailand) K Voravichitchaikul	24	12
(Japan) K Hayakawa (Japan) M Matsutomo	26	21

Quarterfinals
(England) C Adcock (Scotland) I Bankier	21	21
(Japan) K Hayakawa (Japan) M Matsutomo	9	19

=== Bottom half ===
==== Section 3 ====
First Round
(Denmark) R Bonde (Denmark) M Helsbol	15	15
(Thailand) M Jongjit (Thailand) S Amitrapai	21	21
(Japan) S Sato (Japan) S Matsuo	21	21
8	(India) V Diju (India) J Gutta	13	15
Q1	(Switzerland) O Schaller (Switzerland) O Varrin	12	6
(Denmark) M Kolding (Denmark) J Houmann	21	21
(Indonesia) H Setiawan (Indonesia) V Marissa	17	21	20
3	(Thailand) S Prapakamol (Thailand) S Thoungthongkam	21	13	22

Second Round
(Thailand) M Jongjit (Thailand) S Amitrapai	12	21	21
(Japan) S Sato (Japan) S Matsuo	21	15	17
(Denmark) M Kolding (Denmark) J Houmann	16	18
3	(Thailand) S Prapakamol (Thailand) S Thoungthongkam	21	21

Quarterfinals
(Thailand) M Jongjit (Thailand) S Amitrapai	13	9
3	(Thailand) S Prapakamol (Thailand) S Thoungthongkam	21	21

==== Section 4 ====
First Round
Q2	(Japan) H Endo (Japan) A Takahashi	15	16
(China) He HB (China) Bao YX	21	21
(Indonesia) M Rijal (Indonesia) D Susanto	21	15	21
7	(Germany) M Fuchs (Germany) B Michels	19	21	14
(South Korea) Kim K-J (South Korea) Jung K-E	18	21	21
PFQ	(Chinese Taipei) Lin Y-L (Chinese Taipei) Hsieh P-C	21	14	14
(Singapore) C Triyachart (Singapore) Yao L	14	9
2	(Chinese Taipei) Chen H-L (Chinese Taipei) Chen W-H	21	21

Second Round
(China) He HB (China) Bao YX	21	21
(Indonesia) M Rijal (Indonesia) D Susanto	14	14
(South Korea) Kim K-J (South Korea) Jung K-E	15	15
2	(Chinese Taipei) Chen H-L (Chinese Taipei) Chen W-H	21	21

Quarterfinals
(China) He HB (China) Bao YX	21	18	21
2	(Chinese Taipei) Chen H-L (Chinese Taipei) Chen W-H	18	21	18

Preceded by 2012 German Open Grand Prix Gold	BWF Grand Prix Gold and Grand Prix; 2012 season	Succeeded by 2012 Australia Open Grand Prix Gold
