= Chiang Kai-hsin =

Taiwanese badminton player (born 1990)

Chiang Kai-hsin 姜凱心
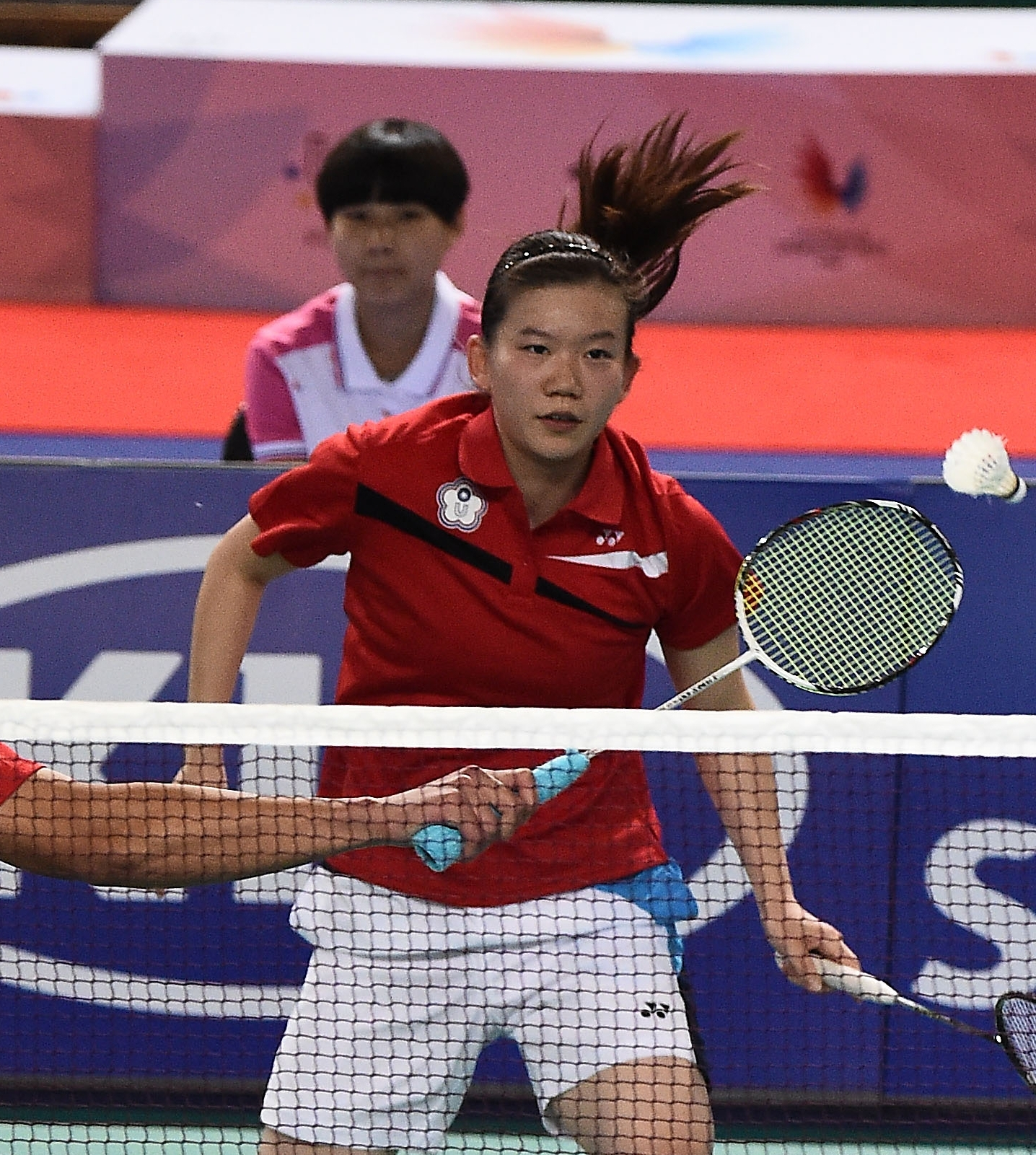
- Portrait of Chiang Kai-Hsin

Personal information
- Born: 25 December 1990 (age 35)
- Height: 1.67 m (5 ft 6 in)
- Weight: 61 kg (134 lb)

Sport
- Country: Republic of China (Taiwan)
- Sport: Badminton

Women's & mixed doubles
- Highest ranking: 24 (WD) 6 April 2017; 50 (XD) 30 March 2017
- BWF profile
Medal record
Badminton
Representing Chinese Taipei
East Asian Games
Silver medal – second place	2009 Hong Kong	Women's team
Summer Universiade
Silver medal – second place	2015 Gwangju	Mixed doubles
Bronze medal – third place	2013 Kazan	Mixed team
World Junior Championships
Bronze medal – third place	2007 Waitakere City	Girls' doubles
Asia Junior Championships
Bronze medal – third place	2008 Kuala Lumpur	Mixed doubles

Chiang Kai-hsin (Chinese: 姜凱心; pinyin: Jiāng Kǎixīn; born 25 December 1990) is a Taiwanese badminton player. In 2007, she reached the girls' doubles semifinal at the World Junior Championships in Waitakere City, New Zealand, winning the bronze medal. In 2009, she won bronze at the East Asian Games in the women's team event. In 2015, she represented National Taiwan Normal University at the World University Badminton Championships in Gwangju, South Korea and won the silver medal in the mixed doubles event. She was also the women's doubles semifinalist at the 2009 and 2014 Vietnam Open Grand Prix tournament.

== Achievements ==
=== Summer Universiade ===
Mixed doubles
Year	Venue	Partner	Opponent	Score	Result
2015	Hwasun Hanium Culture Sports Center; Hwasun, South Korea	(Chinese Taipei) Lu Ching-yao	(South Korea) Kim Gi-jung (South Korea) Shin Seung-chan	14–21, 11–21	Silver

=== BWF World Junior Championships ===
Girls' doubles
Year	Venue	Partner	Opponent	Score	Result
2007	Waitakere Trusts Stadium; Waitakere City, New Zealand	(Chinese Taipei) Tien Ching-yung	(China) Xie Jing (China) Zhong Qianxin	21–19, 14–21, 4–21	Bronze

=== Asian Junior Championships ===
Mixed doubles
Year	Venue	Partner	Opponent	Score	Result
2008	Stadium Juara; Kuala Lumpur, Malaysia	(Chinese Taipei) Chou Tien-chen	(China) Zhang Nan (China) Lu Lu	19–21, 19–21	Bronze
