= Ng Hui Lin =

Malaysian badminton player

Ng Hui Lin 黄惠龄
Personal information
- Born: 6 November 1989 (age 37) Kuala Lumpur, Malaysia
- Height: 1.63 m (5 ft 4 in)

Sport
- Country: Malaysia
- Sport: Badminton
- Handedness: Right

Women's doubles
- Highest ranking: 16 (2009)
- BWF profile
Medal record
Women's badminton
Representing Malaysia
Sudirman Cup
Bronze medal – third place	2009 Guangzhou	Mixed team
Southeast Asian Games
Gold medal – first place	2009 Vientiane	Women's team
Bronze medal – third place	2007 Nakhon Ratchasima	Women's team
World Junior Championships
Gold medal – first place	2007 Waitakere City	Mixed doubles
Bronze medal – third place	2007 Waitakere City	Girls' doubles
Commonwealth Youth Games
Gold medal – first place	2004 Bendigo	Mixed team
Asian Junior Championships
Gold medal – first place	2007 Kuala Lumpur	Mixed team
Silver medal – second place	2005 Jakarta	Girls' team
Bronze medal – third place	2007 Kuala Lumpur	Mixed doubles

Ng Hui Lin (born 6 November 1989) is a Malaysian badminton player. She plays in the doubles event with her younger sister Ng Hui Ern. In December 2014, Hui Lin resigned from the Badminton Association of Malaysia to pursue her career.

== Achievements ==
=== BWF World Junior Championships ===
Girls' doubles
Year	Venue	Partner	Opponent	Score	Result
2007	The Trusts Stadium; Waitakere City, New Zealand	(Malaysia) Goh Liu Ying	(South Korea) Jung Kyung-Eun (South Korea) Yoo Hyun-young	11–21, 12–21	Bronze

Mixed doubles
Year	Venue	Partner	Opponent	Score	Result
2007	The Trusts Stadium; Waitakere City, New Zealand	(Malaysia) Lim Khim Wah	(England) Chris Adcock (England) Gabrielle White	23–25, 22–20, 21–19	Gold

=== Asian Junior Championships ===
Mixed doubles
Year	Venue	Partner	Opponent	Score	Result
2007	Stadium Juara; Kuala Lumpur, Malaysia	(Malaysia) Lim Khim Wah	(South Korea) Shin Baek-cheol (South Korea) Yoo Hyun-young	15–21, 11–21	Bronze

=== BWF Grand Prix ===
The BWF Grand Prix had two levels, the Grand Prix and Grand Prix Gold. It was a series of badminton tournaments sanctioned by the Badminton World Federation (BWF) and played between 2007 and 2017.

Women's doubles
Year	Tournament	Partner	Opponent	Score	Result
2010	Malaysia Grand Prix Gold	(Malaysia) Ng Hui Ern	(Thailand) Duanganong Aroonkesorn (Thailand) Kunchala Voravichitchaikul	21–12, 17–21, 13–21	(silver) Runner-up
2010	India Grand Prix	(Malaysia) Ng Hui Ern	(China) Tang Jinhua (China) Xia Huan	8–21, 19–21	(silver) Runner-up
2012	Vietnam Open	(Malaysia) Ng Hui Ern	(Indonesia) Pia Zebadiah Bernadet (Indonesia) Rizki Amelia Pradipta	17–21, 19–21	(silver) Runner-up
2013	Bitburger Open	(Malaysia) Ng Hui Ern	(Netherlands) Eefje Muskens (Netherlands) Selena Piek	20–22, 15–21	(silver) Runner-up
2013	Scottish Open	(Malaysia) Ng Hui Ern	(Netherlands) Eefje Muskens (Netherlands) Selena Piek	23–25, 21–15, 16–21	(silver) Runner-up

Mixed doubles
Year	Tournament	Partner	Opponent	Score	Result
2010	India Grand Prix	(Malaysia) Gan Teik Chai	(China) Liu Peixuan (China) Tang Jinhua	17–21, 17–21	(silver) Runner-up

BWF Grand Prix Gold tournament
BWF Grand Prix tournament

=== BWF International Challenge/Series ===
Women's doubles
Year	Tournament	Partner	Opponent	Score	Result
2007	Malaysia International	(Malaysia) Goh Liu Ying	(Malaysia) Haw Chiou Hwee (Malaysia) Lim Pek Siah	21–23, 21–19, 11–21	(silver) Runner-up
2011	Scottish International	(Malaysia) Ng Hui Ern	(Sweden) Emelie Lennartsson (Sweden) Emma Wengberg	7–21, 13–21	(silver) Runner-up
2011	Welsh International	(Malaysia) Ng Hui Ern	(England) Alexandra Langley (England) Lauren Smith	21–16, 21–14	(gold) Winner
2011	Irish International	(Malaysia) Ng Hui Ern	(England) Mariana Agathangelou (England) Heather Olver	14–21, 21–16, 21–11	(gold) Winner
2012	Austrian International	(Malaysia) Ng Hui Ern	(United States) Eva Lee (United States) Paula Lynn Obañana	21–16, 21–18	(gold) Winner
2013	Irish Open	(Malaysia) Ng Hui Ern	(Netherlands) Eefje Muskens (Netherlands) Selena Piek	17–21, 10–21	(silver) Runner-up

Mixed doubles
Year	Tournament	Partner	Opponent	Score	Result
2007	Malaysia International	(Malaysia) Lim Khim Wah	(Malaysia) Tan Wee Kiong (Malaysia) Woon Khe Wei	21–15, 21–14	(gold) Winner
2008	Vietnam International	(Malaysia) Lim Khim Wah	(Malaysia) Mohd Razif Abdul Latif (Malaysia) Chong Sook Chin	21–15, 19–21, 21–15	(gold) Winner
2009	Malaysia International	(Malaysia) Mak Hee Chun	(Malaysia) Tan Wee Kiong (Malaysia) Woon Khe Wei	6–21, 21–13, 17–21	(silver) Runner-up
2011	Welsh International	(Scotland) Martin Campbell	(England) Peter Briggs (Malaysia) Ng Hui Ern	21–16, 21–19	(gold) Winner

BWF International Challenge tournament
BWF International Series tournament
