= 2010 Korea Grand Prix =

Tournament details
- Dates: 23–28 November
- Level: Grand Prix
- Total prize money: US$50,000
- Venue: Gimcheon Indoor Gymnasium
- Location: Gimcheon, South Korea

Champions
- Men's singles: (China) Bao Chunlai
- Women's singles: (China) Liu Xin
- Men's doubles: (South Korea) Jung Jae-sung (South Korea) Lee Yong-dae
- Women's doubles: (South Korea) Jung Kyung-eun (South Korea) Yoo Hyun-young
- Mixed doubles: (South Korea) Yoo Yeon-seong (South Korea) Kim Min-jung

The 2010 Korea Grand Prix was a badminton tournament which took place at Gimcheon Indoor Gymnasium in Gimcheon, South Korea from 23 to 28 November 2010 and had a total purse of $50,000. This tournament was upgraded from a BWF International Challenge which have been held from 2007 to 2009 to a Grand Prix event.

== Men's singles ==
=== Seeds ===
1. (China) Bao Chunlai (champion)
2. (South Korea) Park Sung-hwan (second round)
3. (South Korea) Shon Wan-ho (quarter-finals)
4. (Thailand) Tanongsak Saensomboonsuk (quarter-finals)
5. (Hong Kong) Wong Wing Ki (second round)
6. (China) Wang Zhengming (final)
7. (South Korea) Hong Ji-hoon (second round)
8. (Russia) Stanislav Pukhov (second round)

=== Finals ===
Quarter-finals
1 | (China) Bao Chunlai | 21 | 21
(South Korea) Choi Ho-jin | 11 | 6
3 | (South Korea) Shon Wan-ho | 22 | 12
(Japan) Takuma Ueda | 24 | 21
6 | (China) Wang Zhengming | 21 | 21
4 | (Thailand) Tanongsak Saensomboonsuk | 14 | 14
(South Korea) Lee Dong-keun | 21 | 21
(Thailand) Pisit Poodchalat | 10 | 10

Semi-finals
1 | (China) Bao Chunlai | 21 | 21
(Japan) Takuma Ueda | 13 | 19
6 | (China) Wang Zhengming | 21 | 23
(South Korea) Lee Dong-keun | 14 | 21

Final
1 | (China) Bao Chunlai | 23 | 21
6 | (China) Wang Zhengming | 21 | 18

== Women's singles ==
=== Seeds ===
1. (South Korea) Bae Yeon-ju (quarter-finals)
2. (Russia) Ella Diehl (first round)
3. (South Korea) Bae Seung-hee (first round)
4. (South Korea) Sung Ji-hyun (semi-finals)
5. (China) Li Xuerui (final)
6. (Thailand) Ratchanok Intanon (quarter-finals)
7. (China) Liu Xin (champion)
8. (Indonesia) Fransisca Ratnasari (quarter-finals)

=== Finals ===
Semi-finals
5 | (China) Li Xuerui | 21 | 21
4 | (South Korea) Sung Ji-hyun | 17 | 14
7 | (China) Liu Xin | 21 | 21
(China) Zhou Hui | 14 | 16

Final
5 | (China) Li Xuerui | 9 | 14
7 | (China) Liu Xin | 21 | 21

== Men's doubles ==
=== Seeds ===
1. (South Korea) Jung Jae-sung / Lee Yong-dae (champion)
2. (South Korea) Ko Sung-hyun / Yoo Yeon-seong (final)
3. (Russia) Vitalij Durkin / Aleksandr Nikolaenko (second round)
4. (Malaysia) Goh Wei Shem / Teo Kok Siang (semi-finals)
5. (China) Liu Xiaolong / Qiu Zihan (semi-finals)
6. (South Korea) Chung Eui-seok / Kim Dae-eun (second round)
7. (Thailand) Bodin Issara / Maneepong Jongjit (second round)
8. (Indonesia) Didit Juang / Seiko Wahyu Kusdianto (second round)

=== Finals ===
Semi-finals
1 | (South Korea) Jung Jae-sung (South Korea) Lee Yong-dae | 21 | 21
5 | (China) Liu Xiaolong (China) Qiu Zihan | 17 | 19
4 | (Malaysia) Goh Wei Shem (Malaysia) Teo Kok Siang | 11 | 17
2 | (South Korea) Ko Sung-hyun (South Korea) Yoo Yeon-seong | 21 | 21

Final
1 | (South Korea) Jung Jae-sung (South Korea) Lee Yong-dae | 18 | 21 | 27
2 | (South Korea) Ko Sung-hyun (South Korea) Yoo Yeon-seong | 21 | 18 | 25

== Women's doubles ==
=== Seeds ===
1. (Russia) Valeria Sorokina / Nina Vislova (quarter-finals)
2. (South Korea) Jung Kyung-eun / Yoo Hyun-young (champion)
3. (United States) Iris Wang / Rena Wang (second round)
4. (China) Bao Yixin / Lu Lu (semi-finals)

=== Finals ===
Semi-finals
(South Korea) Eom Hye-won (South Korea) Kim Ha-na | 21 | 20 | 21
(South Korea) Lee So-hee (South Korea) Shin Seung-chan | 17 | 22 | 10
4 | (China) Bao Yixin (China) Lu Lu | 21 | 16 | 20
2 | (South Korea) Jung Kyung-eun (South Korea) Yoo Hyun-young | 12 | 21 | 22

Final
(South Korea) Eom Hye-won (South Korea) Kim Ha-na | 16 | 21 | 19
2 | (South Korea) Jung Kyung-eun (South Korea) Yoo Hyun-young | 21 | 18 | 21

== Mixed doubles ==
=== Seeds ===
1. (South Korea) Ko Sung-hyun / Ha Jung-eun (second round)
2. (Russia) Aleksandr Nikolaenko / Valeria Sorokina (semi-finals)
3. (South Korea) Yoo Yeon-seong / Kim Min-jung (champion)
4. (Russia) Vitalij Durkin / Nina Vislova (first round)

=== Finals ===
Semi-finals
(China) Hong Wei (China) Bao Yixin | 21 | 16 | 20
(South Korea) Choi Young-woo (South Korea) Eom Hye-won | 10 | 21 | 22
3 | (South Korea) Yoo Yeon-seong (South Korea) Kim Min-jung | 21 | 21
2 | (Russia) Aleksandr Nikolaenko (Russia) Valeria Sorokina | 15 | 17

Final
(South Korea) Choi Young-woo (South Korea) Eom Hye-won | 15 | 13
3 | (South Korea) Yoo Yeon-seong (South Korea) Kim Min-jung | 21 | 21
