= 2008 Asian Junior Badminton Championships =

Tournament details
- Dates: 13-20 July 2008
- Edition: 11
- Venue: Stadium Juara
- Location: Kuala Lumpur, Malaysia

The 2008 Asian Junior Badminton Championships were held in Kuala Lumpur, Malaysia from 13–20 July.

== Medalists ==
Event	Gold	Silver	Bronze
Teams	China; Chai Biao; Gao Huan; He Mu; Li Gen; Li Peng; Wang Zhengming; Zhang Nan; Zhang Sheng; Chen Xiaojia; Li Xuerui; Lin Shen; Lu Lu; Wang Shixian; Xia Huan; Xie Jing; Zhong Qianxin	South Korea; Choi Young-woo; Kang Ji-wook; Kim Dae-eun; Kim Ki-eung; Kim Ki-jung; Lee Dong-keun; Lee Han-bit; Park Sung-min; Bae Yeon-ju; Choi Min-jung; Eom Hye-won; Jung Kyung-eun; Lee Joo-hee; Lee Se-rang; Shin Seung-chan; Sung Ji-hyun	Malaysia; Chooi Kah Ming; Kuan Kam Chung; Mak Hee Chun; Syawal Ismail; Tan Aik Quan; Teo Kok Siang; Yeoh Choong Yee; Iskandar Zulkarnain Zainuddin; Tiffany Chase-Currier; Chong Vee Vian; Vivian Hoo Kah Mun; Lim Ee Von; Ng Hui Ern; Ong Boon Hui; Sannatasah Saniru; Tee Jing Yi
Teams	China; Chai Biao; Gao Huan; He Mu; Li Gen; Li Peng; Wang Zhengming; Zhang Nan; Zhang Sheng; Chen Xiaojia; Li Xuerui; Lin Shen; Lu Lu; Wang Shixian; Xia Huan; Xie Jing; Zhong Qianxin	South Korea; Choi Young-woo; Kang Ji-wook; Kim Dae-eun; Kim Ki-eung; Kim Ki-jung; Lee Dong-keun; Lee Han-bit; Park Sung-min; Bae Yeon-ju; Choi Min-jung; Eom Hye-won; Jung Kyung-eun; Lee Joo-hee; Lee Se-rang; Shin Seung-chan; Sung Ji-hyun	Hong Kong; Lee Chun Hei; Ng Ka Long; Wong Wing Ki; Chan Hung Yung; Chan Tsz Ka; Poon Lok Yan; Tse Ying Suet; Yeung Hiu Tung
Boys' singles	(China) Wang Zhengming	(South Korea) Park Sung-min	(Hong Kong) Wong Wing Ki
Boys' singles	(China) Wang Zhengming	(South Korea) Park Sung-min	(China) Gao Huan
Girls' singles	(China) Li Xuerui	(China) Wang Shixian	(Thailand) Porntip Buranaprasertsuk
Girls' singles	(China) Li Xuerui	(China) Wang Shixian	(South Korea) Bae Yeon-ju
Boys' doubles	(Malaysia) Mak Hee Chun (Malaysia) Teo Kok Siang	(South Korea) Choi Young-woo (South Korea) Kim Ki-jung	(China) Chai Biao (China) Zhang Nan
Boys' doubles	(Malaysia) Mak Hee Chun (Malaysia) Teo Kok Siang	(South Korea) Choi Young-woo (South Korea) Kim Ki-jung	(Vietnam) Bùi Quang Tuấn (Vietnam) Nguyễn Công Hải
Girls' doubles	(China) Xie Jing (China) Zhong Qianxin	(China) Lu Lu (China) Xia Huan	(Hong Kong) Chan Tsz Ka (Hong Kong) Tse Ying Suet
Girls' doubles	(China) Xie Jing (China) Zhong Qianxin	(China) Lu Lu (China) Xia Huan	(South Korea) Jung Kyung-eun (South Korea) Lee Se-rang
Mixed doubles	(China) Zhang Nan (China) Lu Lu	(South Korea) Kim Ki-jung (South Korea) Eom Hye-won	(South Korea) Kim Ki-eung (South Korea) Lee Se-rang
Mixed doubles	(China) Zhang Nan (China) Lu Lu	(South Korea) Kim Ki-jung (South Korea) Eom Hye-won	(Chinese Taipei) Chou Tien-chen (Chinese Taipei) Chiang Kai-hsin

== Medal table ==
Rank	Nation	Gold	Silver	Bronze	Total
1	China (CHN)	5	2	2	9
2	Malaysia (MAS)	1	0	1	2
3	South Korea (KOR)	0	4	3	7
4	Hong Kong (HKG)	0	0	3	3
5	Chinese Taipei (TPE)	0	0	1	1
5	Thailand (THA)	0	0	1	1
5	Vietnam (VIE)	0	0	1	1
Totals (7 entries)		6	6	12	24
