= 2007 BWF World Junior Championships =

Tournament details
- Edition: 9th
- Level: International
- Venue: Waitakere Trusts Stadium
- Location: Waitakere City

The 2007 BWF World Junior Championships was an international badminton tournament held in Waitakere City, New Zealand.

The team competition was held from 25 to 28 October, and the individual events were from 30 October to 4 November 2007.

== Medalists ==
Event	Gold	Silver	Bronze
Boys' singles	(China) Chen Long	(Japan) Kenichi Tago	(China) Gao Huan
Boys' singles	(China) Chen Long	(Japan) Kenichi Tago	(Chinese Taipei) Lu Chi-Yuan
Girls' singles	(China) Wang Lin	(South Korea) Bae Youn-Joo	(Singapore) Gu Juan
Girls' singles	(China) Wang Lin	(South Korea) Bae Youn-Joo	(China) Liu Xin
Boys doubles	(South Korea) Chung Eui-Seok (South Korea) Shin Baek-cheol	(China) Li Tian (China) Chai Biao	(Malaysia) Lim Khim Wah (Malaysia) Mak Hee Chun
Boys doubles	(South Korea) Chung Eui-Seok (South Korea) Shin Baek-cheol	(China) Li Tian (China) Chai Biao	(Malaysia) Ong Jian Guo (Malaysia) Goh V Shem
Girls doubles	(China) Xie Jing (China) Zhong Qianxin	(South Korea) Yoo Hyun-Young (South Korea) Jung Kyung-Eun	(Chinese Taipei) Tien Ching-Yung (Chinese Taipei) Chiang Kai-Hsin
Girls doubles	(China) Xie Jing (China) Zhong Qianxin	(South Korea) Yoo Hyun-Young (South Korea) Jung Kyung-Eun	(Malaysia) Ng Hui Lin (Malaysia) Goh Liu Ying
Mixed doubles	(Malaysia) Lim Khim Wah (Malaysia) Ng Hui Lin	(England) Chris Adcock (England) Gabrielle White	(Indonesia) Afiat Yuris Wirawan (Indonesia) Debby Susanto
Mixed doubles	(Malaysia) Lim Khim Wah (Malaysia) Ng Hui Lin	(England) Chris Adcock (England) Gabrielle White	(South Korea) Shin Baek-cheol (South Korea) Yoo Hyun-Young
Teams	China; Chai Biao; Chen Long; Chen Zhuo; Gao Huan; Li Tian; Li Xuerui; Liu Xin; Qiu Zihan; Wang Lin; Wang Shixian; Wang Xiaoli; Wang Zhengming; Xie Jing; Zhang Nan; Zhang Qi; Zhong Qianxin	South Korea; Bae Youn-joo; Choi Hye-in; Choi Young-woo; Chung Eui-seok; Eom Hye-won; Jung Kyung-eun; Kang Ji-wook; Kim Ki-eung; Kim Ki-jung; Kim Sa-rang; Lee Se-rang; Park Sung-min; Sung Ji-hyun; Shin Baek-choel; Yoo Hyun-young	Singapore; Ashton Chen Yong Zhao; Fu Mingtian; Gu Juan; Ng Zon Ren; Thng Boon Seong; Derek Wong; Xing Aiying; Yao Lei; Terry Yeo Zhao Jiang; Beiwen Zhang

== Team competition ==
A total of 25 countries competed at the team competition in 2007 BWF World Junior Championships.

=== Final positions ===
1. China
2. South Korea
3. Singapore
4. Malaysia
5. Japan
6. Indonesia
7. Thailand
8. India
9. England
10. Scotland (Debut)
11. Bulgaria
12. New Zealand
13. Netherlands
14. Hong Kong
15. Turkey
16. United States
17. Russia
18. Vietnam
19. Australia
20. Czech Republic
21. Chinese Taipei
22. Philippines
23. South Africa
24. Germany
25. Puerto Rico (Debut)

=== Final round ===
China
3
Auckland, New Zealand
28 October 2007

South Korea
1

			1	2	3
1	(China) (South Korea)	Chai Biao / Li Xuerui; Shin Baek-cheol / Yoo Hyun-Young	18; 21	15; 21
2	(China) (South Korea)	Chen Long; Park Sung-Min	21; 15	21; 14
3	(China) (South Korea)	Wang Lin; Sung Ji-Hyun	21; 12	21; 6
4	(China) (South Korea)	Chai Biao / Li Tian; Shin Baek-cheol / Chung Eui-Seok	18; 21	21; 17	21; 13
5	(China) (South Korea)	Wang Xiaoli / Li Xuerui; Yoo Hyun-Young / Jung Kyung-Eun				not played

== Medal account ==
Pos	Country	Gold	Silver	Bronze	Total
1	China	4	1	2	7
2	South Korea	1	3	1	5
3	Malaysia	1	0	3	4
4	Japan	0	1	0	1
4	England	0	1	0	1
6	Singapore	0	0	2	2
6	Chinese Taipei	0	0	2	2
8	Indonesia	0	0	1	1
