= Lee Se-rang =

South Korean badminton player (born 1991)

Personal information
- Born: 12 March 1991 (age 35)
- Height: 1.68 m (5 ft 6 in)

Sport
- Country: South Korea
- Sport: Badminton
- Handedness: Left

Women's & mixed doubles
- Highest ranking: 143 (WD 1 December 2011); 225 (XD 10 January 2013)
- BWF profile
Medal record
Women's badminton
Representing South Korea
World Junior Championships
Silver medal – second place	2007 Waitakere City	Mixed team
Silver medal – second place	2008 Pune	Mixed team
Asian Junior Championships
Silver medal – second place	2008 Kuala Lumpur	Mixed team
Bronze medal – third place	2008 Kuala Lumpur	Girls' doubles
Bronze medal – third place	2008 Kuala Lumpur	Mixed doubles

- Lee Se-rang
- Hangul: 이세랑
- RR: I Serang
- MR: I Serang

Lee Se-rang (Korean: 이세랑; born 12 March 1991) is a South Korean badminton player who also plays for the KT&G badminton club. In 2011, she won the Vietnam International tournament in the women's doubles event partnered with Choi Hye-in. In 2012, she became the women's doubles runner-up at the Indonesia International tournament with Yoo Hyun-young.

== Achievements ==
=== Asian Junior Championships ===
Girls' doubles
Year	Venue	Partner	Opponent	Score	Result
2008	Stadium Juara; Kuala Lumpur, Malaysia	(South Korea) Jung Kyung-eun	(China) Lu Lu (China) Xia Huan	21–17, 19–21, 16–21	Bronze

Mixed doubles
Year	Venue	Partner	Opponent	Score	Result
2008	Stadium Juara; Kuala Lumpur, Malaysia	(South Korea) Kim Ki-eung	(South Korea) Kim Gi-jung (South Korea) Eom Hye-won	21–23, 15–21	Bronze

=== BWF International Challenge/Series ===
Women's doubles
Year	Tournament	Partner	Opponent	Score	Result
2010	Singapore International	(South Korea) Yim Jae-eun	(Indonesia) Jenna Gozali (Indonesia) Aprilsasi Putri Lejarsar Variella	21–19, 21–12	(gold) Winner
2011	Vietnam International	(South Korea) Choi Hye-in	(Indonesia) Komala Dewi (Indonesia) Jenna Gozali	15–21, 21–10, 21–13	(gold) Winner
2012	Indonesia International	(South Korea) Yoo Hyun-young	(Indonesia) Pia Zebadiah Bernadet (Indonesia) Rizki Amelia Pradipta	17–21, 21–19, 13–21	(silver) Runner-up

BWF International Challenge tournament
BWF International Series tournament
