= Yoo Hyun-young (badminton) =

South Korean badminton player (born 1990)

Personal information
- Born: 3 January 1990 (age 36)
- Height: 1.69 m (5 ft 7 in)
- Weight: 57 kg (126 lb)

Sport
- Country: South Korea
- Sport: Badminton
- Handedness: Right

Women's & mixed doubles
- Highest ranking: 21 (WD 22 July 2010); 19 (XD 29 July 2010)
- BWF profile
Medal record
Women's badminton
Representing South Korea
Asian Games
Bronze medal – third place	2010 Guangzhou	Women's team
East Asian Games
Bronze medal – third place	2009 Hong Kong	Women's team
World Junior Championships
Gold medal – first place	2006 Incheon	Mixed doubles
Gold medal – first place	2006 Incheon	Mixed team
Silver medal – second place	2007 Waitakere City	Girls' doubles
Silver medal – second place	2007 Waitakere City	Mixed team
Bronze medal – third place	2007 Waitakere City	Mixed doubles
Asia Junior Championships
Gold medal – first place	2006 Kuala Lumpur	Mixed doubles
Gold medal – first place	2006 Kuala Lumpur	Mixed team
Silver medal – second place	2006 Kuala Lumpur	Girls' doubles
Silver medal – second place	2007 Kuala Lumpur	Mixed doubles
Bronze medal – third place	2005 Jakarta	Girls' team
Bronze medal – third place	2007 Kuala Lumpur	Girls' doubles

Yoo Hyun-young (Korean: 유현영; Hanja: 柳晛榮; born 3 January 1990) is a badminton player from South Korea. Her first big result internationally came when, at the age of 16, she partnered Lee Yong-dae to win the mixed doubles title at the 2006 BWF World Junior Championships, as well as the mixed team title. She was a team-mate of both Bae Yeon-ju and Jung Kyung-eun at Masan's Sungji Girls' High School and in 2007, all three girls were runners-up at the 2007 BWF World Junior Championships.

After graduating to the senior ranks, Yoo continued to play with both Jung and Shin Baek-cheol, her partner in her last year of junior play. She and Shin were mixed doubles runners-up at the 2010 Swiss Open Super Series. Later that year, she and Jung won their first Grand Prix title, the Korea Grand Prix. However, shortly afterward, both pairings were split up.

Yoo, Bae Yeon-ju, Jung Kyung-eun, and Bae Seung-hee, among others, were coached by Yoo's father Yoo Gap-soo both at Sungji Girls' High School and later at Korea Ginseng Corporation.

== Achievements ==
=== BWF World Junior Championships ===
Girls' doubles
Year	Venue	Partner	Opponent	Score	Result
2007	The Trusts Stadium; Waitakere City, New Zealand	(South Korea) Jung Kyung-eun	(China) Xie Jing (China) Zhong Qianxin	18–21, 21–10, 15–21	Silver

Mixed doubles
Year	Venue	Partner	Opponent	Score	Result
2006	Samsan World Gymnasium; Incheon, South Korea	(South Korea) Lee Yong-dae	(China) Li Tian (China) Ma Jin	18–21, 21–19, 21–14	Gold
2007	The Trust Stadium; Waitakere City, New Zealand	(South Korea) Shin Baek-cheol	(England) Chris Adcock (England) Gabrielle White	20–22, 16–21	Bronze

=== Asian Junior Championships ===
Girls' doubles
Year	Venue	Partner	Opponent	Score	Result
2006	Kuala Lumpur Badminton Stadium; Kuala Lumpur, Malaysia	(South Korea) Sun In-jang	(China) Ma Jin (China) Wang Xiaoli	19–21, 11–21	Silver
2007	Stadium Juara; Kuala Lumpur, Malaysia	(South Korea) Jung Kyung-eun	(Malaysia) Tee Jing Yi (Malaysia) Lyddia Cheah	21–14, 17–21, 18–21	Bronze

Mixed doubles
Year	Venue	Partner	Opponent	Score	Result
2006	Kuala Lumpur Badminton Stadium; Kuala Lumpur, Malaysia	(South Korea) Lee Yong-dae	(Malaysia) Tan Wee Kiong (Malaysia) Woon Khe Wei	21–15, 21–9	Gold
2007	Stadium Juara; Kuala Lumpur, Malaysia	(South Korea) Shin Baek-cheol	(Malaysia) Tan Wee Kiong (Malaysia) Woon Khe Wei	18–21, 21–16, 12–21	Silver

=== BWF Superseries ===
The BWF Superseries, which was launched on 14 December 2006 and implemented in 2007, was a series of elite badminton tournaments, sanctioned by the Badminton World Federation (BWF). BWF Superseries levels were Superseries and Superseries Premier. A season of Superseries consisted of twelve tournaments around the world that had been introduced since 2011. Successful players were invited to the Superseries Finals, which were held at the end of each year.

Mixed doubles
Year	Tournament	Partner	Opponent	Score	Result
2010	Swiss Open	(South Korea) Shin Baek-cheol	(South Korea) Lee Yong-dae (South Korea) Lee Hyo-jung	14–21, 18–21	(silver) Runner-up

BWF Super Series Finals tournament
BWF Super Series Premier tournament
BWF Super Series tournament

=== BWF Grand Prix ===
The BWF Grand Prix had two levels, the Grand Prix and Grand Prix Gold. It was a series of badminton tournaments sanctioned by the Badminton World Federation (BWF) and played between 2007 and 2017.

Women's doubles
Year	Tournament	Partner	Opponent	Score	Result
2010	Chinese Taipei Open	(South Korea) Lee Kyung-won	(South Korea) Kim Min-jung (South Korea) Lee Hyo-jung	14–21, 20–22	(silver) Runner-up
2010	Korea Grand Prix	(South Korea) Jung Kyung-eun	(South Korea) Eom Hye-won (South Korea) Kim Ha-na	21–16, 18–21, 21–19	(gold) Winner

Mixed doubles
Year	Tournament	Partner	Opponent	Score	Result
2011	Vietnam Open	(South Korea) Chung Eui-seok	(Russia) Vitalij Durkin (Russia) Nina Vislova	16–21, 13–21	(silver) Runner-up

BWF Grand Prix Gold tournament
BWF Grand Prix tournament

=== BWF International Challenge/Series ===
Women's doubles
Year	Tournament	Partner	Opponent	Score	Result
2006	Mongolian Satellite	(South Korea) Jung Kyung-eun	(South Korea) Kim Min-jung (South Korea) Sun In-jang	15–21, 18–21	(silver) Runner-up
2006	Malaysia Satellite	(South Korea) Jung Kyung-eun	(South Korea) Jung Youn-kyung (South Korea) Kim Min-jung	14–21, 17–21	(silver) Runner-up
2007	Korea International	(South Korea) Jung Kyung-eun	(South Korea) Bae Seung-hee (South Korea) Lee Seul-gi	21–18, 21–4	(gold) Winner
2009	Korea International	(South Korea) Jung Kyung-eun	(South Korea) Ha Jung-eun (South Korea) Lee Kyung-won	21–19, 21–10	(gold) Winner
2010	Vietnam International	(South Korea) Jung Kyung-eun	(Japan) Rie Eto (Japan) Yu Wakita	21–16, 21–18	(gold) Winner
2011	Turkey International	(South Korea) Choi A-reum	(Germany) Sandra Marinello (Germany) Birgit Michels	18–21, 21–18, 19–21	(silver) Runner-up
2012	Indonesia International	(South Korea) Lee Se-rang	(Indonesia) Pia Zebadiah Bernadet (Indonesia) Rizki Amelia Pradipta	17–21, 21–19, 13–21	(silver) Runner-up

Mixed doubles
Year	Tournament	Partner	Opponent	Score	Result
2006	Mongolian Satellite	(South Korea) Lee Jung-hwan	(South Korea) Yoo Yeon-seong (South Korea) Kim Min-jung	13–21, 15–21	(silver) Runner-up
2007	Korea International	(South Korea) Shin Baek-choel	(South Korea) Kim Sung-kwan (South Korea) Ham Hyo-jin	22–20, 21–3	(gold) Winner
2011	Turkey International	(South Korea) Cho Gun-woo	(South Korea) Kim Sa-rang (South Korea) Lee So-hee	23–25, 21–9, 21–19	(gold) Winner
2012	Indonesia International	(South Korea) Lee Jae-jin	(Indonesia) Trikusuma Wardhana (Indonesia) Aprilsasi Putri Lejarsar Variella	19–21, 21–13, 21–12	(gold) Winner

BWF International Challenge tournament
BWF International Series tournament
