= Zhong Qianxin =

Chinese badminton player (born 1990)

Zhong Qianxin 钟倩欣
Personal information
- Born: 8 May 1990 (age 36) Guangzhou, Guangdong, China
- Height: 1.70 m (5 ft 7 in)
- Weight: 62 kg (137 lb)

Sport
- Country: China
- Sport: Badminton
- Handedness: Right

Women's doubles
- Highest ranking: 2 (10 January 2013)
- BWF profile
Medal record
Women's badminton
Representing China
Asian Championships
Silver medal – second place	2011 Chengdu	Women's doubles
Bronze medal – third place	2012 Qingdao	Women's doubles
Bronze medal – third place	2014 Gimcheon	Women's doubles
World Junior Championships
Gold medal – first place	2007 Waitakere City	Girls' doubles
Gold medal – first place	2007 Waitakere City	Mixed team
Gold medal – first place	2008 Pune	Mixed team
Silver medal – second place	2008 Pune	Girls' doubles
Asian Junior Championships
Gold medal – first place	2008 Kuala Lumpur	Girls' doubles
Gold medal – first place	2008 Kuala Lumpur	Mixed team
Silver medal – second place	2007 Kuala Lumpur	Mixed team

Zhong Qianxin (Chinese: 钟倩欣; born 8 May 1990) is a Chinese badminton player.

== Career ==
Zhong Qianxin won the girls' doubles event at the 2007 BWF World Junior Championships at Waitakere City, New Zealand with Xie Jing. They also won the 2008 Asian Junior Badminton Championships. She won her first Grand Prix event at the 2010 Vietnam Open with Ma Jin. Her first major title she won at the 2011 Yonex Open Japan Super Series with Bao Yixin, followed by a final at the 2011 Indonesia Grand Prix Gold.

One year later, Zhong Qianxin and Bao Yixin won the 2012 Singapore and the China Masters Super Series back to back. They also reached the final of the 2012 Swiss Open Grand Prix Gold losing to compatriots Tang Jinhua and Xia Huan and the final of the 2012 India Open Super Series losing to the Korean pair of Jung Kyung-eun and Kim Ha-na. Zhong and Bao reached the number 2 on the BWF World Ranking for women's doubles in January 2013. They won the final of the 2013 U.S. Open Grand Prix Gold, but lost the final of the 2013 China Open Super Series Premier at home to compatriots Wang Xiaoli and Yu Yang.

== Achievements ==
=== Asian Championships ===
Women's doubles
Year	Venue	Partner	Opponent	Score	Result
2011	Sichuan Gymnasium; Chengdu, China	(China) Bao Yixin	(China) Wang Xiaoli (China) Yu Yang	17–21, 9–21	Bronze
2012	Qingdao Sports Centre Conson Stadium; Qingdao, China	(China) Bao Yixin	(China) Tian Qing (China) Zhao Yunlei	14–21, 15–21	Silver
2014	Gimcheon Indoor Stadium; Gimcheon, South Korea	(China) Xia Huan	(South Korea) Jung Kyung-eun (South Korea) Kim Ha-na	23–21, 15–21, 16–21	Bronze

=== BWF World Junior Championships ===
Girls' doubles
Year	Venue	Partner	Opponent	Score	Result
2007	The Trusts Stadium; Waitakere City, New Zealand	(China) Xie Jing	(South Korea) Jung Kyung-eun (South Korea) Yoo Hyun-young	21–18, 10–21, 21–15	Gold
2008	Shree Shiv Chhatrapati Badminton Hall; Pune, India	(China) Xie Jing	(Singapore) Fu Mingtian (Singapore) Yao Lei	19–21, 17–21	Silver

=== Asian Junior Championships ===
Girls' doubles
Year	Venue	Partner	Opponent	Score	Result
2008	Stadium Juara; Kuala Lumpur, Malaysia	(China) Xie Jing	(China) Lu Lu (China) Xia Huan	20–22, 21–14, 22–20	Gold

=== BWF Superseries ===
The BWF Superseries, which was launched on 14 December 2006 and implemented in 2007, is a series of elite badminton tournaments, sanctioned by the Badminton World Federation (BWF). BWF Superseries levels are Superseries and Superseries Premier. A season of Superseries consists of twelve tournaments around the world that have been introduced since 2011. Successful players are invited to the Superseries Finals, which are held at the end of each year.

Women's doubles
Year	Tournament	Partner	Opponent	Score	Result
2010	China Open	(China) Ma Jin	(China) Cheng Shu (China) Zhao Yunlei	Walkover	(silver) Runner-up
2011	Japan Open	(China) Bao Yixin	(Chinese Taipei) Chen Wen-hsing (Chinese Taipei) Chien Yu-chin	13–21, 25–23, 21–12	(gold) Winner
2012	India Open	(China) Bao Yixin	(South Korea) Jung Kyung-eun (South Korea) Kim Ha-na	17–21, 18–21	(silver) Runner-up
2012	Singapore Open	(China) Bao Yixin	(Chinese Taipei) Cheng Wen-hsing (Chinese Taipei) Chien Yu-chin	21–12, 21–17	(gold) Winner
2012	China Masters	(China) Bao Yixin	(China) Cheng Shu (China) Luo Yu	21–12, 21–15	(gold) Winner
2013	China Open	(China) Bao Yixin	(China) Wang Xiaoli (China) Yu Yang	13–21, 7–21	(silver) Runner-up
2015	Japan Open	(China) Zhao Yunlei	(Denmark) Christinna Pedersen (Denmark) Kamilla Rytter Juhl	21–12, 21–16	(gold) Winner

BWF Super Series Finals tournament
BWF Super Series Premier tournament
BWF Super Series tournament

=== BWF Grand Prix ===
The BWF Grand Prix had two levels, the BWF Grand Prix and Grand Prix Gold. It was a series of badminton tournaments sanctioned by the Badminton World Federation (BWF) which was held from 2007 to 2017.

Women's doubles
Year	Tournament	Partner	Opponent	Score	Result
2010	Vietnam Open	(China) Ma Jin	(China) Tang Jinhua (China) Xia Huan	21–19, 21–23, 21–13	(gold) Winner
2011	Indonesia Grand Prix Gold	(China) Bao Yixin	(Malaysia) Vivian Hoo Kah Mun (Malaysia) Woon Khe Wei	21–19, 19–21, 18–21	(silver) Runner-up
2012	Swiss Open	(China) Bao Yixin	(China) Tang Jinhua (China) Xia Huan	17–21, 10–21	(silver) Runner-up
2013	U.S. Open	(China) Bao Yixin	(China) Huang Yaqiong (China) Yu Xiaohan	21–17, 24–22	(gold) Winner
2014	Macau Open	(China) Huang Yaqiong	(China) Ou Dongni (China) Yu Xiaohan	21–19, 19–21, 7–21	(silver) Runner-up
2015	China Masters	(China) Tang Jinhua	(China) Bao Yixin (China) Tang Yuanting	21–14, 11–21, 21–17	(gold) Winner
2015	New Zealand Open	(China) Xia Huan	(Japan) Yuki Fukushima (Japan) Sayaka Hirota	17–21, 24–22, 21–19	(gold) Winner
2015	U.S. Open	(China) Yu Yang	(Japan) Ayane Kurihara (Japan) Naru Shinoya	21–14, 21–10	(gold) Winner
2016	Chinese Taipei Open	(China) Huang Dongping	(China) Luo Ying (China) Luo Yu	21–18, 21–16	(gold) Winner

BWF Grand Prix Gold tournament
BWF Grand Prix tournament
