= Karyn Velez =

Filipino-American badminton player

Personal information
- Full name: Karyn Cecilia Velez
- Nickname: Chibby
- Born: 5 March 1990 Philadelphia, Pennsylvania, United States
- Died: 12 August 2013 (aged 23) Pasig, Philippines
- Height: 170 cm (5 ft 7 in)
- Weight: 63 kg (139 lb)

Sport
- Country: United States; Philippines
- Sport: Badminton
- Handedness: Right

Women's singles
- Highest ranking: 67 (September 23, 2010)
Medal record
Badminton
Representing United States
Pan Am Championships
Bronze medal – third place	2012 Lima	Women's singles

Karyn Cecilia Velez (March 5, 1990 – August 12, 2013) was a Filipino-American badminton player who competed in international level events.

Velez died of serious injuries in a head-on car crash aged 23. The van driver who struck her vehicle pleaded guilty for homicide after he was charged for reckless driving.

Before her death, she was aiming to qualify for the 2016 Summer Olympics.
