= Wang Xiaoli =

Chinese badminton player (born 1989)

Wang Xiaoli 王晓理
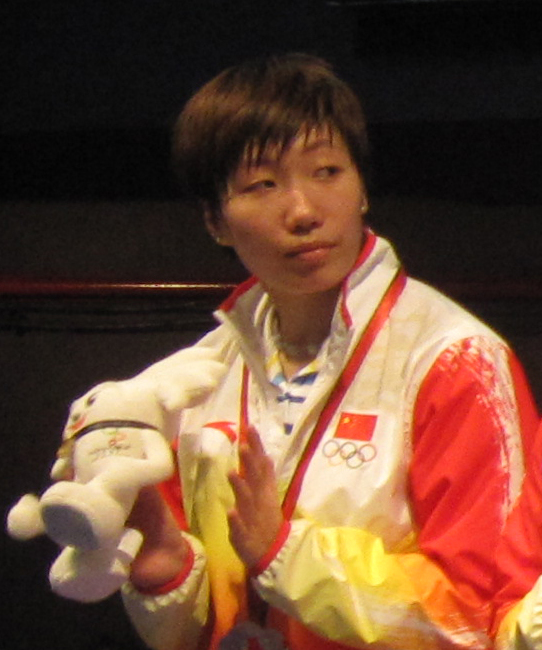
- Wang at the 2009 East Asian Games

Personal information
- Born: 24 June 1989 (age 37) Hubei, China
- Height: 1.75 m (5 ft 9 in)
- Weight: 64 kg (141 lb)

Sport
- Country: China
- Sport: Badminton
- Handedness: Right
- Retired: 13 December 2015

Women's doubles
- Highest ranking: 1 (22 May 2014)
- BWF profile
Medal record
Women's badminton
Representing China
World Championships
Gold medal – first place	2011 London	Women's doubles
Gold medal – first place	2013 Guangzhou	Women's doubles
Silver medal – second place	2010 Paris	Women's doubles
Silver medal – second place	2014 Copenhagen	Women's doubles
Bronze medal – third place	2009 Hyderabad	Women's doubles
Sudirman Cup
Gold medal – first place	2011 Qingdao	Mixed team
Gold medal – first place	2013 Kuala Lumpur	Mixed team
Gold medal – first place	2015 Donggun	Mixed team
Uber Cup
Gold medal – first place	2012 Wuhan	Women's team
Gold medal – first place	2014 New Delhi	Women's team
Silver medal – second place	2010 Kuala Lumpur	Women's team
Asian Games
Gold medal – first place	2010 Guangzhou	Women's team
Gold medal – first place	2014 Incheon	Women's team
Silver medal – second place	2010 Guangzhou	Women's doubles
Asian Championships
Gold medal – first place	2009 Suwon	Women's doubles
Gold medal – first place	2011 Chengdu	Women's doubles
Gold medal – first place	2013 Taipei	Women's doubles
Silver medal – second place	2015 Wuhan	Women's doubles
East Asian Games
Gold medal – first place	2009 Hong Kong	Women's team
Silver medal – second place	2009 Hong Kong	Women's doubles
World Junior Championships
Gold medal – first place	2006 Incheon	Girls' doubles
Gold medal – first place	2007 Waitakere City	Mixed team
Silver medal – second place	2006 Incheon	Mixed team
Bronze medal – third place	2006 Incheon	Mixed doubles
Asian Junior Championships
Gold medal – first place	2006 Kuala Lumpur	Girls' doubles
Silver medal – second place	2007 Kuala Lumpur	Mixed team
Bronze medal – third place	2006 Kuala Lumpur	Mixed team

Wang Xiaoli (Chinese: 王晓理; pinyin: Wáng Xiǎolǐ; born 24 June 1989) is a Chinese badminton player who is a doubles specialist. In 2012, she competed at the 2012 London Summer Olympics.

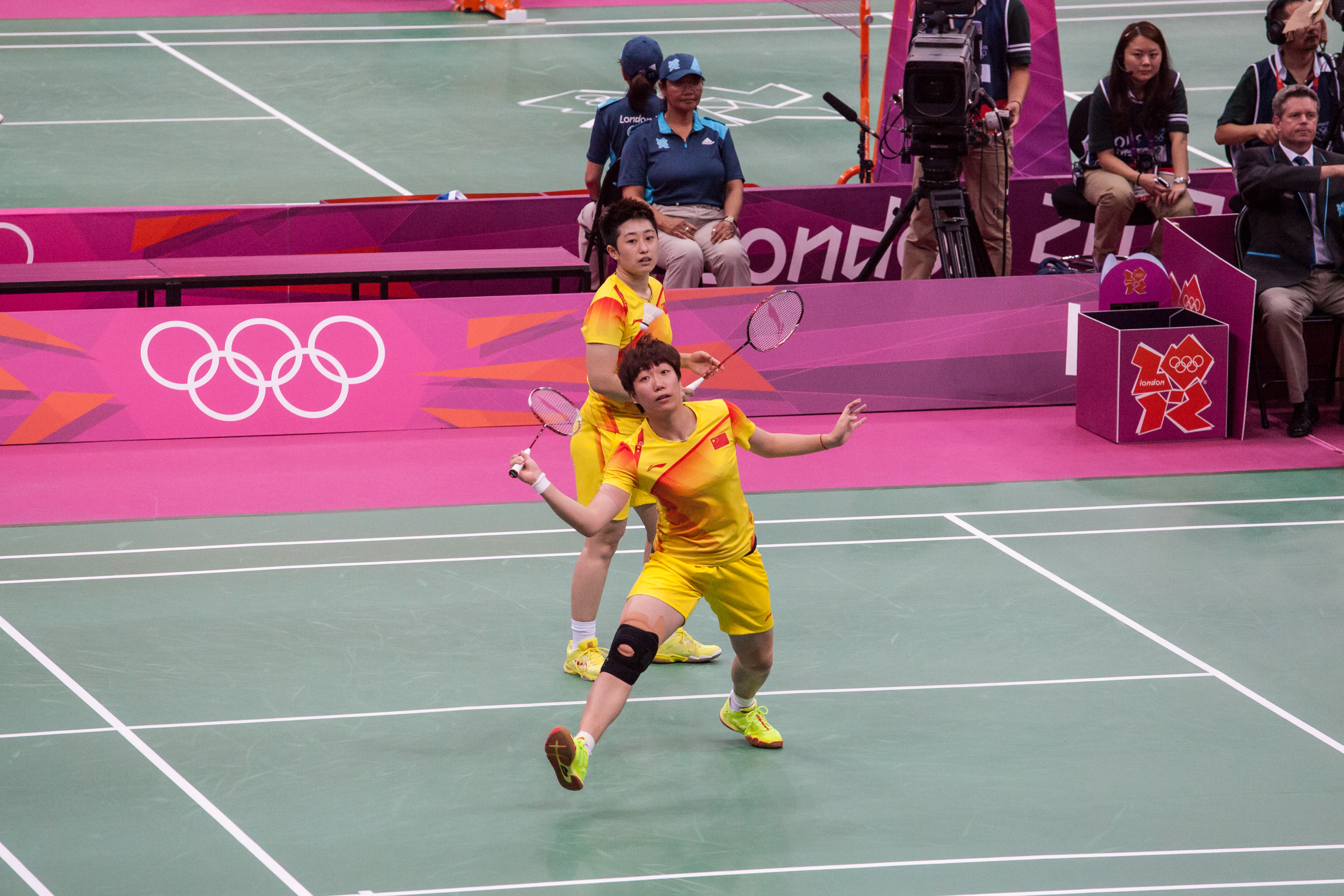
Wang Xiaoli with her partner Yu Yang competed at the 2012 London Olympics

== Career ==
In 2005, she joined the Chinese national second team and officially became the first team in 2008. Wang Xiaoli began her international career in 2009 when she paired with Tao Jiaming in mixed doubles and with Ma Jin in women's doubles. She quickly gained success with Ma Jin and culminated their career with a gold medal at the 2009 Asia Championships. In the middle of the 2010 season, Wang Xiaoli dropped mixed doubles from her repertoire of events and began competing in women's doubles with Yu Yang. Despite their short time together, Wang Xiaoli and Yu Yang have reached the number one ranking in the world for their event. In 2011, she and Yu Yang received an award "BWF Female Player of the Year", who have become the first shuttlers to scoop a grand slam with their 5 BWF World Superseries Premier titles in 2011. Having only teamed up for slightly over a year, they have already picked up the 2011 World title and were also champions at the 2011 Asian Championships. They also made 12 consecutive finals appearances with 7 BWF World Superseries titles to their name in 2011.

At the 2012 Summer Olympics, Wang and her partner, Yu Yang, along with Jung Kyung-eun and Kim Ha-na, Ha Jung-eun and Kim Min-jung of South Korea, and Meiliana Jauhari and Greysia Polii of Indonesia, were disqualified from the competition for "not using one's best efforts to win a match" and "conducting oneself in a manner that is clearly abusive or detrimental to the sport", following matches the previous evening during which they were accused of throwing the match. Yu Yang and Wang Xiaoli played against South Korea's Jung Kyung-eun and Kim Ha-na, and it has been suggested that both teams wanted to lose in order to secure an easier draw, although Yu claimed "she and her partner were just trying to conserve their strength for the knockout rounds".

== Achievements ==
=== BWF World Championships ===
Women's doubles
Year	Venue	Partner	Opponent	Score	Result
2009	Gachibowli Indoor Stadium, Hyderabad, India	(China) Ma Jin	(China) Cheng Shu (China) Zhao Yunlei	16–21, 12–21	Bronze
2010	Stade Pierre de Coubertin, Paris, France	(China) Ma Jin	(China) Du Jing (China) Yu Yang	9–21, 17–21	Silver
2011	Wembley Arena, London, England	(China) Yu Yang	(China) Tian Qing (China) Zhao Yunlei	22–20, 21–11	Gold
2013	Tianhe Sports Center, Guangzhou, China	(China) Yu Yang	(South Korea) Eom Hye-won (South Korea) Chang Ye-na	21–14, 18–21, 21–8	Gold
2014	Ballerup Super Arena, Copenhagen, Denmark	(China) Yu Yang	(China) Tian Qing (China) Zhao Yunlei	19–21, 15–21	Silver

=== Asian Games ===
Women's doubles
Year	Venue	Partner	Opponent	Score	Result
2010	Tianhe Gymnasium, Guangzhou, China	(China) Yu Yang	(China) Tian Qing (China) Zhao Yunlei	22–20, 15–21, 12–21	Silver

=== Asian Championships ===
Women's doubles
Year	Venue	Partner	Opponent	Score	Result
2009	Suwon Indoor Stadium, Suwon, South Korea	(China) Ma Jin	(South Korea) Lee Hyo-jung (South Korea) Lee Kyung-won	21–11, 21–18	Gold
2011	Sichuan Gymnasium, Chengdu, China	(China) Yu Yang	(China) Tian Qing (China) Zhao Yunlei	21–13, 21–10	Gold
2013	Taipei Arena, Taipei, Taiwan	(China) Yu Yang	(China) Ma Jin (China) Tang Jinhua	21–15, 14–21, 21–15	Gold
2015	Wuhan Sports Center Gymnasium, Wuhan, China	(China) Yu Yang	(China) Ma Jin (China) Tang Yuanting	12–21, 12–21	Silver

=== East Asian Games ===
Women's doubles
Year	Venue	Partner	Opponent	Score	Result
2009	Queen Elizabeth Stadium, Hong Kong, China	(China) Ma Jin	(Macau) Zhang Dan (Macau) Zhang Zhibo	20–22, 16–21	Silver

=== BWF World Junior Championships ===
Girls' doubles
Year	Venue	Partner	Opponent	Score	Result
2006	Samsan World Gymnasium, Incheon, South Korea	(China) Ma Jin	(South Korea) Hong Soo-jung (South Korea) Sun In-jang	21–13, 21–18	Gold

Mixed doubles
Year	Venue	Partner	Opponent	Score	Result
2006	Samsan World Gymnasium, Incheon, South Korea	(China) Hu Wenqing	(China) Li Tian (China) Ma Jin	3–4 retired	Bronze

=== Asian Junior Championships ===
Girls' doubles
Year	Venue	Partner	Opponent	Score	Result
2006	Kuala Lumpur Badminton Stadium, Kuala Lumpur, Malaysia	(China) Ma Jin	(South Korea) Sun In-jang (South Korea) Yoo Hyun-young	21–19, 21–11	Gold

=== BWF Superseries ===
The BWF Superseries, which was launched on 14 December 2006 and implemented in 2007, is a series of elite badminton tournaments, sanctioned by the Badminton World Federation (BWF). BWF Superseries levels are Superseries and Superseries Premier. A season of Superseries consists of twelve tournaments around the world that have been introduced since 2011. Successful players are invited to the Superseries Finals, which are held at the end of each year.

Women's doubles
Year	Tournament	Partner	Opponent	Score	Result
2009	Japan Open	(China) Ma Jin	(Japan) Miyuki Maeda (Japan) Satoko Suetsuna	21–19, 21–18	(gold) Winner
2009	French Open	(China) Ma Jin	(China) Cheng Shu (China) Zhao Yunlei	21–13, 21–8	(gold) Winner
2009	Hong Kong Open	(China) Ma Jin	(China) Du Jing (China) Yu Yang	16–21, 21–19, 21–12	(gold) Winner
2010	Malaysia Open	(China) Ma Jin	(China) Du Jing (China) Yu Yang	16–21, 12–21	(silver) Runner-up
2010	China Masters	(China) Yu Yang	(China) Bao Yixin (China) Lu Lu	21–8, 21–8	(gold) Winner
2010	Japan Open	(China) Yu Yang	(China) Cheng Shu (China) Zhao Yunlei	21–17, 21–6	(gold) Winner
2010	Hong Kong Open	(China) Yu Yang	(Chinese Taipei) Cheng Wen-hsing (Chinese Taipei) Chien Yu-chin	21–11, 21–12	(gold) Winner
2010	World Superseries Finals	(China) Yu Yang	(China) Cheng Shu (China) Zhao Yunlei	21–7, 21–17	(gold) Winner
2011	Malaysia Open	(China) Yu Yang	(China) Tian Qing (China) Zhao Yunlei	12–21, 21–6, 17–21	(silver) Runner-up
2011	Korea Open	(China) Yu Yang	(China) Tian Qing (China) Zhao Yunlei	21–18, 19–21, 21–4	(gold) Winner
2011	All England Open	(China) Yu Yang	(Japan) Mizuki Fujii (Japan) Reika Kakiiwa	21–2, 21–9	(gold) Winner
2011	Indonesia Open	(China) Yu Yang	(Indonesia) Vita Marissa (Indonesia) Nadya Melati	21–12, 21–10	(gold) Winner
2011	China Masters	(China) Yu Yang	(China) Tang Jinhua (China) Xia Huan	19–21, retired	(silver) Runner-up
2011	Denmark Open	(China) Yu Yang	(China) Tian Qing (China) Zhao Yunlei	22–20, 21–16	(gold) Winner
2011	French Open	(China) Yu Yang	(China) Tian Qing (China) Zhao Yunlei	26–24, 21–15	(gold) Winner
2011	Hong Kong Open	(China) Yu Yang	(China) Tian Qing (China) Zhao Yunlei	21–12, 14–2 retired	(gold) Winner
2011	China Open	(China) Yu Yang	(China) Tang Jinhua (China) Xia Huan	21–11, 21–10	(gold) Winner
2011	World Superseries Finals	(China) Yu Yang	(South Korea) Ha Jung-eun (South Korea) Kim Min-jung	21–8, 21–12	(gold) Winner
2012	All England Open	(China) Yu Yang	(China) Tian Qing (China) Zhao Yunlei	17–21, 12–21	(silver) Runner-up
2012	Indonesia Open	(China) Yu Yang	(China) Tian Qing (China) Zhao Yunlei	17–21, 21–9, 21–16	(gold) Winner
2012	China Open	(China) Yu Yang	(Japan) Miyuki Maeda (Japan) Satoko Suetsuna	21–19, 14–7 retired	(gold) Winner
2012	Hong Kong Open	(China) Yu Yang	(China) Tian Qing (China) Zhao Yunlei	20–22, 21–14, 17–21	(silver) Runner-up
2012	World Superseries Finals	(China) Yu Yang	(Denmark) Christinna Pedersen (Denmark) Kamilla Rytter Juhl	21–16, 21–14	(gold) Winner
2013	Korea Open	(China) Yu Yang	(China) Ma Jin (China) Tang Jinhua	21–17, 21–13	(gold) Winner
2013	All England Open	(China) Yu Yang	(China) Cheng Shu (China) Zhao Yunlei	21–18, 21–10	(gold) Winner
2013	Indonesia Open	(China) Yu Yang	(China) Bao Yixin (China) Cheng Shu	21–15, 18–21, 18–21	(silver) Runner-up
2013	China Masters	(China) Yu Yang	(China) Ma Jin (China) Tang Jinhua	21–17, 21–16	(gold) Winner
2013	China Open	(China) Yu Yang	(China) Bao Yixin (China) Zhong Qianxin	21–13, 21–7	(gold) Winner
2014	All England Open	(China) Yu Yang	(China) Ma Jin (China) Tang Yuanting	21–17, 18–21, 23–21	(gold) Winner
2014	Denmark Open	(China) Yu Yang	(Japan) Misaki Matsutomo (Japan) Ayaka Takahashi	21–14, 21–14	(gold) Winner
2014	French Open	(China) Yu Yang	(China) Ma Jin (China) Tang Yuanting	21–15, 21–9	(gold) Winner
2014	China Open	(China) Yu Yang	(China) Tian Qing (China) Zhao Yunlei	21–16, 19–21, 22–20	(gold) Winner
2015	All England Open	(China) Yu Yang	(China) Bao Yixin (China) Tang Yuanting	14–21, 14–21	(silver) Runner-up

Mixed doubles
Year	Tournament	Partner	Opponent	Score	Result
2009	China Masters	(China) Tao Jiaming	(China) Xie Zhongbo (China) Zhang Yawen	13–21, 21–19, 8–4 retired	(gold) Winner

BWF Super Series Finals tournament
BWF Super Series Premier tournament
BWF Super Series tournament

=== BWF Grand Prix ===
The BWF Grand Prix had two levels, the BWF Grand Prix and Grand Prix Gold. It was a series of badminton tournaments sanctioned by the Badminton World Federation (BWF) which was held from 2007 to 2017.

Women's doubles
Year	Tournament	Partner	Opponent	Score	Result
2008	Macau Open	(China) Ma Jin	(China) Cheng Shu (China) Zhao Yunlei	15–21, 18–21	(silver) Runner-up
2009	India Open	(China) Ma Jin	(Indonesia) Vita Marissa (Indonesia) Nadya Melati	21–14, 21–13	(gold) Winner
2009	Malaysia Grand Prix Gold	(China) Ma Jin	(Malaysia) Chin Eei Hui (Malaysia) Wong Pei Tty	21–9, 21–11	(gold) Winner
2010	German Open	(China) Ma Jin	(China) Cheng Shu (China) Zhao Yunlei	24–22, 21–15	(gold) Winner
2014	Chinese Taipei Open	(China) Yu Yang	(Indonesia) Nitya Krishinda Maheswari (Indonesia) Greysia Polii	18–21, 11–21	(silver) Runner-up

BWF Grand Prix Gold tournament
BWF Grand Prix tournament

== Record against selected opponents ==
Women's doubles results with Yu Yang against Superseries Finals finalists, Worlds Semi-finalists, and Olympic quarterfinalists.

- (Bulgaria) / (Russia) Petya Nedelcheva & Anastasia Russkikh 1–0
- (Canada) Alex Bruce & Michelle Li 1–0
- (China) Bao Yixin & Lu Lu 1–0
- (China) Bao Yixin & Zhong Qianxin 3–0
- (China) Cheng Shu & Zhao Yunlei 6–0
- (China) Ma Jin & Zhong Qianxin 1–0
- (China) Tian Qing & Zhao Yunlei 8–3
- (China) Xia Huan & Tang Jinhua 3–1
- (China) Ma Jin & Tang Jinhua 5–0
- (China) Bao Yixin & Cheng Shu 0–1
- (China) Bao Yixin & Tang Jinhua 0–1
- (China) Ma Jin & Tang Yuanting 3–0
- (China) Bao Yixin & Tang Yuanting 0–1
- (China) Luo Ying & Luo Yu 4–0
- (Chinese Taipei) Cheng Wen-hsing & Chien Yu-chin 4–0
- (Denmark) Christinna Pedersen & Kamilla Rytter Juhl 6–1
- (Hong Kong) Poon Lok Yan & Tse Ying Suet 8–0
- (India) Jwala Gutta & Ashwini Ponnappa 3–0
- (Indonesia) Vita Marissa & Nadya Melati 2–0
- (Japan) Mizuki Fujii & Reika Kakiiwa 4–0
- (Japan) Miyuki Maeda & Satoko Suetsuna 5–0
- (Japan) Shizuka Matsuo & Mami Naito 7–0
- (Japan) Misaki Matsutomo & Ayaka Takahashi 3–0
- (South Korea) Ha Jung-eun & Kim Min-jung 7–1
- (South Korea) Jung Kyung-eun & Kim Ha-na 5–0
- (Malaysia) Chin Eei Hui & Wong Pei Tty 2–0
- (Russia) Valeria Sorokina & Nina Vislova 1–0
- (Singapore) Shinta Mulia Sari & Yao Lei 2–0
- (South Africa) Michelle Claire Edwards & Annari Viljoen 1–0
- (Thailand) Duanganong Aroonkesorn & Kunchala Voravichitchaikul 5–0
