= Chan Tsz Ka =

Hong Kong badminton player (born 1990)

Chan Tsz Ka 陳祉嘉
Personal information
- Born: 10 February 1990 (age 36) Hong Kong
- Height: 1.70 m (5 ft 7 in)
- Weight: 60 kg (132 lb)

Sport
- Country: Hong Kong
- Sport: Badminton
- Handedness: Right

Women's
- Highest ranking: 26 (WS) 9 January 2014; 23 (WD) 17 March 2011; 70 (XD) 29 January 2015
- BWF profile
Medal record
Badminton
Representing Hong Kong
East Asian Games
Bronze medal – third place	2013 Tianjin	Women's team
Bronze medal – third place	2009 Hong Kong	Women's team
Asia Junior Championships
Bronze medal – third place	2008 Kuala Lumpur	Girls' doubles
Bronze medal – third place	2008 Kuala Lumpur	Mixed team

Chan Tsz Ka (Chinese: 陳祉嘉; Jyutping: can^{4} zi^{2} gaa^{1}; born 10 February 1990) is a badminton player from Hong Kong. She competed at the 2010 and 2014 Asian Games.

== Achievements ==
=== Asian Junior Championships ===
Girls' doubles
Year	Venue	Partner	Opponent	Score	Result
2008	Stadium Juara; Kuala Lumpur, Malaysia	(Hong Kong) Tse Ying Suet	(China) Xie Jing (China) Zhong Qianxin	14–21, 15–21	Bronze

=== BWF Grand Prix ===
The BWF Grand Prix has two level such as Grand Prix and Grand Prix Gold. It is a series of badminton tournaments, sanctioned by Badminton World Federation (BWF) since 2007.

Women's doubles
Year	Tournament	Partner	Opponent	Score	Result
2009	New Zealand Open	(Hong Kong) Tse Ying Suet	(Indonesia) Annisa Wahyuni (Indonesia) Anneke Feinya Agustin	19–21, 17–21	(silver) Runner-up

BWF Grand Prix Gold tournament
BWF Grand Prix tournament

=== BWF International Challenge/Series ===
Women's singles
Year	Tournament	Opponent	Score	Result
2012	Austrian International	(Japan) Sayaka Takahashi	17–21, 9–21	(silver) Runner-up
2010	Polish International	(Japan) Kana Ito	14–21, 18–21	(silver) Runner-up

Women's doubles
Year	Tournament	Partner	Opponent	Score	Result
2010	Polish International	(Hong Kong) Chau Hoi Wah	(Singapore) Shinta Mulia Sari (Singapore) Yao Lei	21–18, 16–21, 10–21	(silver) Runner-up

BWF International Challenge tournament
BWF International Series tournament
