= Jung Kyung-eun =

South Korean badminton player (born 1990)

Jung Kyung-eun 정경은
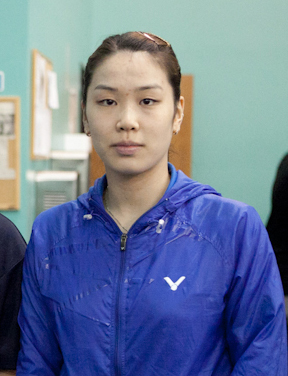

Personal information
- Born: 20 March 1990 (age 36) Masan, South Gyeongsang Province, South Korea
- Height: 1.72 m (5 ft 8 in)

Sport
- Country: South Korea
- Sport: Badminton
- Handedness: Right
- Coached by: Lee Kyung-won

Women's & mixed doubles
- Highest ranking: 2 (WD with Shin Seung-chan 24 November 2016); 26 (XD with Kim Gi-jung 14 June 2012)
- BWF profile
Medal record
Women's badminton
Representing South Korea
Olympic Games
Bronze medal – third place	2016 Rio de Janeiro	Women's doubles
Sudirman Cup
Gold medal – first place	2017 Gold Coast	Mixed team
Silver medal – second place	2013 Kuala Lumpur	Mixed team
Bronze medal – third place	2011 Qingdao	Mixed team
Bronze medal – third place	2015 Dongguan	Mixed team
Uber Cup
Gold medal – first place	2010 Kuala Lumpur	Women's team
Silver medal – second place	2012 Wuhan	Women's team
Silver medal – second place	2016 Kunshan	Women's team
Bronze medal – third place	2014 New Delhi	Women's team
Asian Games
Silver medal – second place	2014 Incheon	Women's team
Asia Championships
Silver medal – second place	2014 Gimcheon	Women's doubles
Asia Team Championships
Bronze medal – third place	2016 Hyderabad	Women's team
East Asian Games
Bronze medal – third place	2009 Hong Kong	Women's team
World Junior Championships
Silver medal – second place	2007 Waitakere City	Girls' doubles
Silver medal – second place	2007 Waitakere City	Mixed team
Silver medal – second place	2008 Pune	Mixed team
Asian Junior Championships
Silver medal – second place	2008 Kuala Lumpur	Mixed team
Bronze medal – third place	2007 Kuala Lumpur	Girls' doubles
Bronze medal – third place	2008 Kuala Lumpur	Girls' doubles

Jung Kyung-eun (Korean: 정경은; Korean pronunciation: [tɕʌŋ.ɡjʌŋ.ɯn] or [tɕʌŋ] [kjʌŋ.ɯn]; born 20 March 1990) is a South Korean professional badminton player. She was the 2016 Summer Olympics bronze medalist in the women's doubles event.

== Career ==
Jung Kyung-eun began her career competing in singles, but now concentrates on doubles. She has attained the most success with her women's doubles partner Kim Ha-na. In April 2012, they won their first major title at the 2012 India Open. In the mixed doubles she has recently partnered with Kim Ki-jung; however, they have not achieved the same level of results as they have had in doubles with their respective genders.

At the 2012 Summer Olympics, Jung and her partner Kim Ha-na, along with Ha Jung-eun and Kim Min-jung of South Korea, Wang Xiaoli and Yu Yang of China, and Meiliana Jauhari and Greysia Polii of Indonesia were disqualified from the competition for "not using one's best efforts to win a match" and "conducting oneself in a manner that is clearly abusive or detrimental to the sport" following matches the previous evening during which they were accused of trying to lose in order to manipulate the draw. Jung and her partner Kim Ha-na played against China's Wang Xiaoli and Yu Yang. South Korea filed an appeal to the Badminton World Federation at the Olympics, but it was rejected.

Jung competed at the 2014 Asian Games, and won the bronze medal together with the national women's team.

At the 2016 Olympics she and doubles partner Shin Seung-chan won the bronze medal.

In 2017, she helped the Korean national team to win the world team championships at the Sudirman Cup.

== Achievements ==
=== Olympic Games ===
Women's doubles
Year	Venue	Partner	Opponent	Score	Result
2016	Riocentro - Pavilion 4, Rio de Janeiro, Brazil	(South Korea) Shin Seung-chan	(China) Tang Yuanting (China) Yu Yang	21–8, 21–17	Bronze

=== Asian Championships ===
Women's doubles
Year	Venue	Partner	Opponent	Score	Result
2014	Gimcheon Indoor Stadium; Gimcheon, South Korea	(South Korea) Kim Ha-na	(China) Luo Ying (China) Luo Yu	18–21, 18–21	Silver

=== BWF World Junior Championships ===
Girls' doubles
Year	Venue	Partner	Opponent	Score	Result
2007	The Trusts Stadium; Waitakere City, New Zealand	(South Korea) Yoo Hyun-young	(China) Xie Jing (China) Zhong Qianxin	18–21, 21–10, 15–21	Silver

=== Asian Junior Championships ===
Girls' doubles
Year	Venue	Partner	Opponent	Score	Result
2007	Stadium Juara; Kuala Lumpur, Malaysia	(South Korea) Yoo Hyun-young	(Malaysia) Lydia Cheah (Malaysia) Tee Jing Yi	21–14, 17–21, 18–21	Bronze
2008	Stadium Juara; Kuala Lumpur, Malaysia	(South Korea) Lee Se-rang	(China) Lu Lu (China) Xia Huan	21–17, 19–21, 16–21	Bronze

=== BWF World Tour (5 titles, 2 runners-up) ===
The BWF World Tour, which was announced on 19 March 2017 and implemented in 2018, is a series of elite badminton tournaments sanctioned by the Badminton World Federation (BWF). The BWF World Tour is divided into levels of World Tour Finals, Super 1000, Super 750, Super 500, Super 300 (part of the HSBC World Tour), and the BWF Tour Super 100.

Women's doubles
Year	Tournament	Level	Partner	Opponent	Score	Result
2018	Korea Masters	Super 300	(South Korea) Chang Ye-na	(South Korea) Lee So-hee (South Korea) Shin Seung-chan	21–14, 21–17	(gold) Winner
2019	Swiss Open	Super 300	(South Korea) Chang Ye-na	(Japan) Nami Matsuyama (Japan) Chiharu Shida	21–16, 21–13	(gold) Winner
2019	U.S. Open	Super 300	(South Korea) Baek Ha-na	(Japan) Nami Matsuyama (Japan) Chiharu Shida	16–21, 16–21	(silver) Runner-up
2019	Hyderabad Open	Super 100	(South Korea) Baek Ha-na	(India) Ashwini Ponnappa (India) N. Sikki Reddy	21–17, 21–17	(gold) Winner
2019	Denmark Open	Super 750	(South Korea) Baek Ha-na	(China) Chen Qingchen (China) Jia Yifan	9–21, 21–19, 21–15	(gold) Winner
2019	Syed Modi International	Super 300	(South Korea) Baek Ha-na	(South Korea) Chang Ye-na (South Korea) Kim Hye-rin	23–21, 21–15	(gold) Winner
2020	Thailand Masters	Super 300	(South Korea) Baek Ha-na	(China) Chen Qingchen (China) Jia Yifan	21–17, 17–21, 15–21	(silver) Runner-up

=== BWF Superseries (3 titles, 4 runners-up) ===
The BWF Superseries, which was launched on 14 December 2006 and implemented in 2007, is a series of elite badminton tournaments, sanctioned by the Badminton World Federation (BWF). BWF Superseries levels are Superseries and Superseries Premier. A season of Superseries consists of twelve tournaments around the world that have been introduced since 2011. Successful players are invited to the Superseries Finals, which are held at the end of each year.

Women's doubles
Year	Tournament	Partner	Opponent	Score	Result
2012	India Open	(South Korea) Kim Ha-na	(China) Bao Yixin (China) Zhong Qianxin	21–17, 21–18	(gold) Winner
2014	India Open	(South Korea) Kim Ha-na	(China) Tang Yuanting (China) Yu Yang	10–21, 21–13, 16–21	(silver) Runner-up
2015	Malaysia Open	(South Korea) Chang Ye-na	(China) Luo Ying (China) Luo Yu	18–21, 9–21	(silver) Runner-up
2015	Denmark Open	(South Korea) Shin Seung-chan	(China) Tian Qing (China) Zhao Yunlei	Walkover	(gold) Winner
2016	Malaysia Open	(South Korea) Shin Seung-chan	(China) Tang Yuanting (China) Yu Yang	11–21, 17–21	(silver) Runner-up
2016	Korea Open	(South Korea) Shin Seung-chan	(China) Luo Ying (China) Luo Yu	21–13, 21–11	(gold) Winner
2016	Denmark Open	(South Korea) Shin Seung-chan	(Japan) Misaki Matsutomo (Japan) Ayaka Takahashi	21–19, 11–21, 16–21	(silver) Runner-up

BWF Super Series Finals tournament
BWF Super Series Premier tournament
BWF Super Series tournament

=== BWF Grand Prix (9 titles, 6 runners-up) ===
The BWF Grand Prix had two levels, the BWF Grand Prix and Grand Prix Gold. It was a series of badminton tournaments sanctioned by the Badminton World Federation (BWF) which was held from 2007 to 2017.

Women's doubles
Year	Tournament	Partner	Opponent	Score	Result
2010	Korea Grand Prix	(South Korea) Yoo Hyun-young	(South Korea) Eom Hye-won (South Korea) Kim Ha-na	21–16, 18–21, 21–19	(gold) Winner
2011	Swiss Open	(South Korea) Kim Ha-na	(South Korea) Ha Jung-eun (South Korea) Kim Min-jung	12–21, 13–21	(silver) Runner-up
2011	U.S. Open	(South Korea) Kim Ha-na	(South Korea) Ha Jung-eun (South Korea) Kim Min-jung	21–14, 20–22, 18–21	(silver) Runner-up
2011	Macau Open	(South Korea) Kim Ha-na	(South Korea) Eom Hye-won (South Korea) Jang Ye-na	8–4 Retired	(gold) Winner
2012	German Open	(South Korea) Kim Ha-na	(China) Tang Jinhua (China) Xia Huan	21–23, 13–21	(silver) Runner-up
2013	German Open	(South Korea) Kim Ha-na	(China) Ma Jin (China) Tang Jinhua	11–21, 21–14, 21–13	(gold) Winner
2013	Swiss Open	(South Korea) Kim Ha-na	(South Korea) Lee So-hee (South Korea) Shin Seung-chan	23–21, 21–16	(gold) Winner
2013	Chinese Taipei Open	(South Korea) Kim Ha-na	(South Korea) Lee So-hee (South Korea) Shin Seung-chan	Walkover	(gold) Winner
2014	German Open	(South Korea) Kim Ha-na	(Japan) Misaki Matsutomo (Japan) Ayaka Takahashi	21–23, 22–24	(silver) Runner-up
2015	Korea Masters	(South Korea) Shin Seung-chan	(South Korea) Chang Ye-na (South Korea) Lee So-hee	7–21, 21–16, 19–21	(silver) Runner-up
2015	Macau Open	(South Korea) Shin Seung-chan	(Hong Kong) Poon Lok Yan (Hong Kong) Tse Ying Suet	18–21, 15–15 retired	(gold) Winner
2015	U.S. Grand Prix	(South Korea) Shin Seung-chan	(South Korea) Chang Ye-na (South Korea) Lee So-hee	24–22, 18–21, 21–12	(gold) Winner
2016	Syed Modi International	(South Korea) Shin Seung-chan	(Netherlands) Eefje Muskens (Netherlands) Selena Piek	21–15, 21–13	(gold) Winner
2016	Korea Masters	(South Korea) Shin Seung-chan	(South Korea) Chae Yoo-jung (South Korea) Kim So-yeong	21–14, 21–14	(gold) Winner

Mixed doubles
Year	Tournament	Partner	Opponent	Score	Result
2011	Korea Grand Prix Gold	(South Korea) Kim Ki-jung	(South Korea) Yoo Yeon-seong (South Korea) Jang Ye-na	17–21, 19–21	(silver) Runner-up

BWF Grand Prix Gold tournament
BWF Grand Prix tournament

=== BWF International Challenge/Series (5 titles, 3 runners-up) ===
Women's doubles
Year	Tournament	Partner	Opponent	Score	Result
2006	Mongolian Satellite	(South Korea) Yoo Hyun-young	(South Korea) Kim Min-jung (South Korea) Sun In-jang	15–21, 18–21	(silver) Runner-up
2006	Malaysia Satellite	(South Korea) Yoo Hyun-young	(South Korea) Jung Youn-kyung (South Korea) Kim Min-jung	14–21, 17–21	(silver) Runner-up
2007	Korea International	(South Korea) Yoo Hyun-young	(South Korea) Bae Seung-hee (South Korea) Lee Seul-gi	21–18, 21–4	(gold) Winner
2009	Singapore International	(South Korea) Kim Jin-ock	(Singapore) Yao Lei (Singapore) Shinta Mulia Sari	22–20, 18–21, 22–20	(gold) Winner
2009	Korea International	(South Korea) Yoo Hyun-young	(South Korea) Ha Jung-eun (South Korea) Lee Kyung-won	21–19, 21–10	(gold) Winner
2010	Vietnam International	(South Korea) Yoo Hyun-young	(Japan) Rie Eto (Japan) Yu Wakita	21–16, 21–18	(gold) Winner
2026	Singapore International	(South Korea) Kim So-yeong	(South Korea) Kim Yu-jung (South Korea) Lee Yu-lim	24–22, 21–14	(gold) Winner

Mixed doubles
Year	Tournament	Partner	Opponent	Score	Result
2009	Singapore International	(South Korea) Heo Hoon-hoi	(South Korea) Lee Jae-jin (South Korea) Kim Jin-ock	19–21, 11–21	(silver) Runner-up

BWF International Challenge tournament
BWF International Series tournament

== Record against selected opponents ==
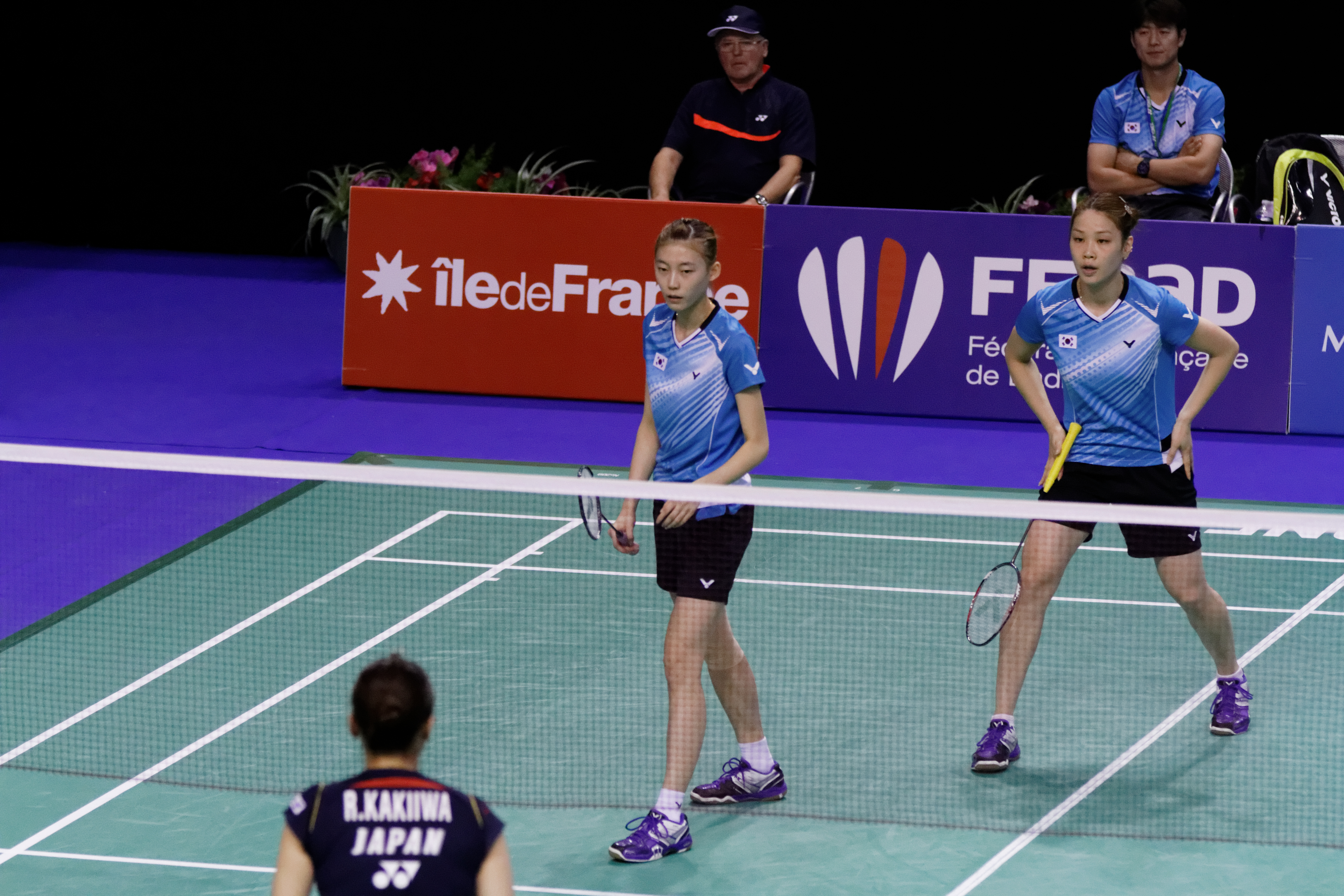
Jung Kyung-eun and Kim Ha-na at the 2013 French Super Series.

Women's doubles results with Kim Ha-na against Super Series finalists, World Championships semifinalists, and Olympic quarterfinalists.

- (Australia) Leanne Choo & Renuga Veeran 1–0
- (Canada) Alex Bruce & Michelle Li 1–0
- (China) Xia Huan & Tang Jinhua 0–2
- (China) Wang Xiaoli & Yu Yang 0–5
- (China) Tian Qing & Zhao Yunlei 0–5
- (China) Bao Yixin & Zhong Qianxin 1–3
- (China) Bao Yixin & Tian Qing 1–0
- (China) Bao Yixin & Cheng Shu 0–1
- (China) Ma Jin & Tang Jinhua 1–1
- (China) Luo Ying & Luo Yu 3–4
- (China) Tang Yuanting & Yu Yang 0–1
- (Chinese Taipei) Cheng Wen-hsing & Chien Yu-chin 1–2
- (Denmark) Christinna Pedersen & Kamilla Rytter Juhl 2–3
- (Hong Kong) Poon Lok Yan & Tse Ying Suet 2–0
- (India) Jwala Gutta & Ashwini Ponnappa 2–1
- (Indonesia) Vita Marissa & Nadya Melati 1–0
- (Japan) Mizuki Fujii & Reika Kakiiwa 3–1
- (Japan) Miyuki Maeda & Satoko Suetsuna 3–0
- (Japan) Shizuka Matsuo & Mami Naito 3–2
- (Japan) Misaki Matsutomo & Ayaka Takahashi 6–3
- (Japan) Reika Kakiiwa & Miyuki Maeda 2–2
- (South Korea) Ha Jung-eun & Kim Min-jung 1–3
- (Malaysia) Chin Eei Hui & Wong Pei Tty 2–0
- (Singapore) Shinta Mulia Sari & Yao Lei 1–0
- (Thailand) Duanganong Aroonkesorn & Kunchala Voravichitchaikul 2–0
