= Lu Lu (badminton) =

Chinese badminton player

Lu Lu 陆璐
Personal information
- Born: 29 September 1990 (age 36) Nanning, Guangxi, China
- Height: 1.71 m (5 ft 7 in)
- Weight: 67 kg (148 lb)

Sport
- Country: China
- Sport: Badminton
- Handedness: Right

Women's & mixed doubles
- Highest ranking: 63 (WD) 15 September 2011; 187 (XD) 23 September 2010
- BWF profile
Medal record
Women's badminton
Representing China
World Junior Championships
Gold medal – first place	2008 Pune	Mixed team
Silver medal – second place	2008 Pune	Mixed doubles
Bronze medal – third place	2008 Pune	Girls' doubles
Asia Junior Championships
Gold medal – first place	2008 Kuala Lumpur	Mixed doubles
Gold medal – first place	2008 Kuala Lumpur	Mixed team
Silver medal – second place	2008 Kuala Lumpur	Girls' doubles

Lu Lu (Chinese: 陆璐; born 29 September 1990) is a retired Chinese female badminton player. In 2008, she won gold medal in the mixed team event at the World Junior Championships. In the individual event, she won mixed doubles silver and girls' doubles bronze. She also competed at the Asian Junior Championships, and won the girls' doubles silver medal, and gold medals in the mixed team and doubles event. Partnered with Zhang Nan, Lu became the champion at the 2009 Philippines Open. In 2010, she became the women's doubles runner-up at the China Masters Super Series tournament with Bao Yixin.

== Achievements ==
=== BWF World Junior Championships ===
Girls' doubles
Year	Venue	Partner	Opponent	Score	Result
2008	Badminton Hall Shree Shiv Chhatrapati; Pune, India	(China) Xia Huan	(Singapore) Fu Mingtian (Singapore) Yao Lei	18–21, 21–13, 18–21	Bronze

Mixed doubles
Year	Venue	Partner	Opponent	Score	Result
2008	Badminton Hall Shree Shiv Chhatrapati; Pune, India	(China) Zhang Nan	(China) Chai Biao (China) Xie Jing	19–21, 15–21	Silver

=== Asian Junior Championships ===
Girls' doubles
Year	Venue	Partner	Opponent	Score	Result
2008	Stadium Juara; Kuala Lumpur, Malaysia	(China) Xia Huan	(China) Xie Jing (China) Zhong Qianxin	22–20, 14–21, 20–22	Silver

Mixed doubles
Year	Venue	Partner	Opponent	Score	Result
2008	Stadium Juara; Kuala Lumpur, Malaysia	(China) Zhang Nan	(South Korea) Kim Ki-jung (South Korea) Eom Hye-won	14–21, 21–15, 24–22	Gold

=== BWF Superseries ===
The BWF Superseries, launched on 14 December 2006 and implemented in 2007, is a series of elite badminton tournaments, sanctioned by Badminton World Federation (BWF). BWF Superseries has two level such as Superseries and Superseries Premier. A season of Superseries features twelve tournaments around the world, which introduced since 2011, with successful players invited to the Superseries Finals held at the year end.

Women's doubles
Year	Tournament	Partner	Opponent	Score	Result
2010	China Masters	(China) Bao Yixin	(China) Wang Xiaoli (China) Yu Yang	8–21, 8–21	(silver) Runner-up

BWF Super Series Finals tournament
BWF Super Series Premier tournament
BWF Super Series tournament

=== BWF Grand Prix ===
The BWF Grand Prix has two levels: Grand Prix and Grand Prix Gold. It is a series of badminton tournaments, sanctioned by Badminton World Federation (BWF) since 2007.

Mixed doubles
Year	Tournament	Partner	Opponent	Score	Result
2009	Philippines Open	(China) Zhang Nan	(China) Chen Zhiben (China) Zhang Jinkang	22–20, 21–19	(gold) Winner

BWF Grand Prix Gold tournament
BWF Grand Prix tournament
