= 2007 Philippines Open Grand Prix Gold =

Tournament details
- Dates: July 17, 2007 – July 22, 2007
- Edition: 2nd
- Level: Grand Prix Gold
- Total prize money: US$120,000
- Venue: PhilSports Complex
- Location: Metro Manila, Philippines

Champions
- Men's singles: (Malaysia) Lee Chong Wei
- Women's singles: (Hong Kong) Zhou Mi
- Men's doubles: (Malaysia) Koo Kien Keat (Malaysia) Tan Boon Heong
- Women's doubles: (Chinese Taipei) Cheng Wen-hsing (Chinese Taipei) Chien Yu-chin
- Mixed doubles: (Indonesia) Nova Widianto (Indonesia) Liliyana Natsir

The 2007 Philippines Open Grand Prix Gold was a badminton tournament which took place in Metro Manila, Philippines from 17 to 22 July 2007. It had a total purse of $120,000.

== Tournament ==
The 2007 Philippines Open Grand Prix Gold was the forth tournament of the 2007 BWF Grand Prix Gold and Grand Prix and also part of the Philippines Open championships which has been held since 2006. This tournament was organized by the Philippine Badminton Association and sanctioned by the BWF.

=== Venue ===
This international tournament was held at PhilSports Complex in Metro Manila, Philippines.

=== Point distribution ===
Below is the point distribution for each phase of the tournament based on the BWF points system for the BWF Grand Prix Gold event.

Winner	Runner-up	3/4	5/8	9/16	17/32	33/64	65/128	129/256	257/512
7,000	5,950	4,900	3,850	2,750	1,670	660	320	130	60

=== Prize money ===
The total prize money for this tournament was US$120,000. Distribution of prize money was in accordance with BWF regulations.

Event	Winner	Finals	Semi-finals	Quarter-finals	Last 16
Singles	$9,000	$4,560	$1,740	$720	$420
Doubles	$9,480	$4,560	$1,680	$870	$450

== Men's singles ==
=== Seeds ===
1. (China) Cheng Hong (final)
2. (Malaysia) Lee Chong Wei (champion)
3. (China) Bao Chunlai (third round)
4. (Denmark) Kenneth Jonassen (quarter-finals)
5. (Indonesia) Taufik Hidayat (second round)
6. (Indonesia) Sony Dwi Kuncoro (semi-finals)
7. (Japan) Shōji Satō (third round)
8. (Malaysia) Muhammad Hafiz Hashim (second round)
9. (South Korea) Park Sung-hwan (semi-finals)
10. (Singapore) Ronald Susilo (quarter-finals)
11. (England) Andrew Smith (third round)
12. (Singapore) Kendrick Lee Yen Hui (first round)
13. (Malaysia) Lee Tsuen Seng (third round)
14. (Malaysia) Yeoh Kay Bin (second round)
15. (Hong Kong) Chan Yan Kit (first round)
16. (Hong Kong) Ng Wei (third round)

=== Finals ===
Semi-finals
1	(China) Chen Hong	21	21
9	(South Korea) Park Sung-hwan	16	19
6	(Indonesia) Sony Dwi Kuncoro
2	(Malaysia) Lee Chong Wei	w	/	o

Final
1	(China) Chen Hong	9	15
2	(Malaysia) Lee Chong Wei	21	21

=== Top half ===
==== Section 1 ====
First Round
1	(China) Chen H	21	21
PFQ	(India) A Jayaram	19	17
(India) A Pawar	21	21
(Austria) J Koch	8	13
12	(Singapore) K Lee Y H	20	15
Q1	(Malaysia) Chan K B	22	21
(Australia) J Tho	10	14
PFQ	(Chinese Taipei) Hsieh Y-h	21	21
5	(Indonesia) T Hidayat	21	21
PFQ	(Iran) K Mehrabi	13	12
(Vietnam) Nguyễn T M	21	21
(Germany) B Joppien	10	14
14	(Malaysia) Yeoh K B	21	21
(India) C Anand	10	15
(South Korea) Lee C-h	21	21
PFQ	(Malaysia) B Wong	19	12

Second Round
1	(China) Chen H	21	21
(India) A Pawar	14	18
Q1	(Malaysia) Chan K B	15	21	21
PFQ	(Chinese Taipei) Hsieh Y-h	21	12	18
5	(Indonesia) T Hidayat	18	13
(Vietnam) Nguyễn T M	21	21
14	(Malaysia) Yeoh K B	14	27	13
(South Korea) Lee C-h	21	25	21

Third Round
1	(China) Chen H	21	21
Q1	(Malaysia) Chan K B	17	11
(Vietnam) Nguyễn T M	21	21
(South Korea) Lee C-h	16	18

Quarter-finals
1	(China) Chen H	17	21	21
(Vietnam) Nguyễn T M	21	19	15

==== Section 2 ====
First Round
4	(Denmark) K Jonassen	21	21
PFQ	(Portugal) A Paixão	10	8
(Japan) Y Nakanishi	20	21
PFQ	(Malaysia) K Lim	22	23
16	(Hong Kong) Ng W	21	21
(India) N Kanetkar	13	14
(Thailand) P Sapkulchananart	25	22	18
(Republic of Ireland) S Evans	27	20	21
8	(Malaysia) M H Hashim	21	21
(Slovenia) L Petrič	9	14
PFQ	(Russia) S Pukhov	21	19	22
(Japan) K Saeki	19	21	20
9	(South Korea) Park S-h	21	21
(Italy) K Raffeiner	8	7
(Canada) A Dabeka	21	21
(Indonesia) A Yunus	19	16

Second Round
4	(Denmark) K Jonassen	21	21
PFQ	(Malaysia) K Lim	11	14
16	(Hong Kong) Ng W	21	21
(Republic of Ireland) S Evans	12	13
8	(Malaysia) M H Hashim	21	21	13
PFQ	(Russia) S Pukhov	13	23	21
9	' (South Korea) Park S-h	23	21
(Canada) A Dabeka	21	14

Third Round
4	(Denmark) K Jonassen	21	21
16	(Hong Kong) Ng W	8	13
PFQ	(Russia) S Pukhov	17	15
9	(South Korea) Park S-h	21	21

Quarter-finals
4	(Denmark) K Jonassen	19	20
9	(South Korea) Park S-h	21	22

=== Bottom half ===
==== Section 3 ====
First Round
Q4	(South Korea) Han K-h	10	5
(Indonesia) A Y W Hartanto	21	21
(Czech Republic) P Koukal	18	10
13	(Malaysia) Lee T S	21	21
(Indonesia) A K Tedjono	21	8	21
Q8	(Thailand) P Vilailak	18	21	11
(India) Parupalli K	18	12
6	(Indonesia) S D Kuncoro	21	21
Q6	(Philippines) K Asuncion	17	14
(Malaysia) Y Khrishnan	21	21
(Malaysia) Tan C S	14	12
10	(Singapore) R Susilo	21	21
(Japan) S Sasaki	22	21
(Malaysia) Liew D	20	16
PFQ	(Indonesia) A Adiyawarman	14	12
3	(China) Bao CL	21	21

Second Round
(Indonesia) A Y W Hartanto	21	19	9
13	(Malaysia) Lee T S	13	21	21
(Indonesia) A K Tedjono	10	14
6	(Indonesia) S D Kuncoro	21	21
(Malaysia) Y Khrishnan	7	17
10	(Singapore) R Susilo	21	21
(Japan) S Sasaki	19	14
3	(China) Bao CL	21	21

Third Round
13	(Malaysia) Lee T S	20	15
6	(Indonesia) S D Kuncoro	22	21
10	(Singapore) R Susilo	21	21
3	(China) Bao CL	14	8

Quarter-finals
6	(Indonesia) S D Kuncoro	21	21
10	(Singapore) R Susilo	14	13

==== Section 4 ====
First Round
Q5	(Indonesia) D H Rumbaka	16	18
(Australia) S Gomez	21	21
Q3	(China) Gong WJ	21	21
15	(Hong Kong) Chan Y K	15	18
(Malaysia) S A Ayob	19	21	21
(Canada) S Wojcikiewicz	21	12	15
(Canada) B Milroy	19	5^{r}
7	(Japan) S Satō	21	8
(South Korea) Lee H-i	21	21
(Denmark) J Persson	15	19
Q2	(Indonesia) W H Putro	17	21	12
11	(England) A Smith	21	18	21
(India) A Sridhar	19	14
PFQ	(Indonesia) T Sugiarto	21	21
Q7	(Chinese Taipei) Liao S-s	15	12
2	(Malaysia) Lee C W	21	21

Second Round
(Australia) S Gomez	17	14
Q3	(China) Gong WJ	21	21
(Malaysia) S A Ayob	19	23	20
7	(Japan) S Satō	21	21	22
(South Korea) Lee H-i	24	19	13
11	(England) A Smith	22	21	21
PFQ	(Indonesia) T Sugiarto	21	15	16
2	(Malaysia) Lee C W	13	21	21

Third Round
Q3	(China) Gong WJ	21	23
7	(Japan) S Satō	14	21
11	(England) A Smith	12	16
2	(Malaysia) Lee C W	21	21

Quarter-finals
Q3	(China) Gong WJ	21	11
2	(Malaysia) Lee C W	23	21

== Women's singles ==
=== Seeds ===
1. (Germany) Huaiwen Xu (withdrew)
2. (France) Pi Hongyan (withdrew)
3. (Malaysia) Wong Mew Choo (withdrew)
4. (Japan) Eriko Hirose (second round)
5. (Denmark) Tine Rasmussen (first round)
6. (Hong Kong) Yip Pui Yin (quarter-finals)
7. (Japan) Kaori Mori (second round)
8. (Singapore) Li Li (first round)

=== Finals ===
Semi-finals
(Indonesia) Adriyanti Firdasari	13	20
Q4	(China) Zhu Jingjing	21	22
Q1	(Hong Kong) Zhou Mi	21	17	21
(Germany) Juliane Schenk	14	21	12

Final
Q4	(China) Zhu Jingjing	18	12
Q1	(Hong Kong) Zhou Mi	21	21

=== Top half ===
==== Section 1 ====
First Round
PFQ	(Indonesia) P Z Bernadeth	20	21	20
(Indonesia) A Firdasari	22	18	22
(Portugal) F Lamy	9	12
(Italy) A Allegrini	21	21
8	(Singapore) Li L	21	17	16
(Chinese Taipei) Cheng S-c	15	21	21
(Slovenia) M Tvrdy	5	12
Q2	(China) Wang YH	21	21

Second Round
(Indonesia) A Firdasari	22	21
(Italy) A Allegrini	20	13
(Chinese Taipei) Cheng S-c	15	15
Q2	(China) Wang YH	21	21

Quarter-finals
(Indonesia) A Firdasari	21	21
Q2	(China) Wang YH	14	16

==== Section 2 ====
First Round
4	(Japan) E Hirose	21	21
(Thailand) S Chansrisukot	11	17
(Canada) A Rice	21	21
(Austria) S Prutsch	12	12
5	(Denmark) T Rasmussen	21	12	19
(Malaysia) J Wong P X	12	21	21
(India) S Nehwal	15	13
Q4	(China) Zhu JJ	21	21

Second Round
4	(Japan) E Hirose	21	10^{r}
(Canada) A Rice	9	4
(Malaysia) J Wong P X	14	18
Q4	(China) Zhu JJ	21	21

Quarter-finals
(Canada) A Rice	10	13
Q4	(China) Zhu JJ	21	21

=== Bottom half ===
==== Section 3 ====
First Round
(Malaysia) A R Kaur	10	12
Q1	(Hong Kong) Zhou M	21	21
(Thailand) S Ponsana	18	18
7	(Japan) K Mori	21	21
(Thailand) M Meemeak	17	8
(Japan) Y Hirayama	21	21
(Russia) E Karachkova	21	19
PFQ	(France) W Rahmawati	23	21

Second Round
Q1	(Hong Kong) Zhou M	21	21
7	(Japan) K Mori	12	11
(Japan) Y Hirayama	21	21
PFQ	(France) W Rahmawati	16	14

Quarter-finals
Q1	(Hong Kong) Zhou M	21	21
(Japan) Y Hirayama	17	14

==== Section 4 ====
First Round
(Chinese Taipei) Pai M-j	21	21
Q3	(Japan) M Fujii	9	9
PFQ	(South Korea) Kim M-h	13	17
6	(Hong Kong) Yip P Y	21	21
(Indonesia) M K Yulianti	21	18	13
(Singapore) Xing AY	6	21	21
(Germany) J Schenk	21	21
PFQ	(Japan) K Yonekura	15	15

Second Round
(Chinese Taipei) Pai M-j	25	13
6	(Hong Kong) Yip P Y	27	21
(Singapore) Xing AY	16	17
(Germany) J Schenk	21	21

Quarter-finals
6	(Hong Kong) Yip P Y	17	21	13
(Germany) J Schenk	21	19	21

== Men's doubles ==
=== Seeds ===
1. (Malaysia) Koo Kien Keat / Tan Boon Heong (champions)
2. (Indonesia) Candra Wijaya / (United States) Tony Gunawan (second round)
3. (Japan) Shintaro Ikeda / Shuichi Sakamoto (first round)
4. (Hong Kong) Albertus Susanto Njoto / Yohan Hadikusumo Wiratama (semi-finals)
5. (Japan) Keita Masuda / Tadashi Ōtsuka (quarter-finals)
6. (Indonesia) Hendra Aprida Gunawan / Joko Riyadi (first round)
7. (Australia) Ashley Brehaut / Aji Basuki Sindoro (first round)
8. (Indonesia) Luluk Hadiyanto / Alvent Yulianto (quarter-finals)

=== Finals ===
Semi-finals
1	(Malaysia) Koo Kien Keat (Malaysia) Tan Boon Heong	21	21
(South Korea) Cho Gun-woo (South Korea) Han Sang-hoon	4	12
4	(Hong Kong) Albertus Susanto Njoto (Hong Kong) Yohan Hadikusumo Wiratama	17	17
(China) Guo Zhendong (China) Xie Zhongbo	21	21

Final
1	(Malaysia) Koo Kien Keat (Malaysia) Tan Boon Heong	21	26
(China) Guo Zhendong (China) Xie Zhongbo	8	24

=== Top half ===
==== Section 1 ====
First Round
1	(Malaysia) Koo K K (Malaysia) Tan B H	19	21	21
PFQ	(Denmark) M Boe (Denmark) C Mogensen	21	14	11
(Denmark) R Andersen (Denmark) P Steffensen	21	21
Q1	(Thailand) W Bunwiroon (Thailand) S Jantharasom	18	17
7	(Australia) A Brehaut (Australia) A B Sindoro	21	10	18
(Indonesia) Y S Dasuki (Indonesia) R Sukmawan	16	21	21
(Malaysia) Chew C E (Malaysia) Hong C H	19	21	21
(Hong Kong) Hui W H (Hong Kong) A T Putra	21	10	10

Second Round
1	(Malaysia) Koo K K (Malaysia) Tan B H	21	21
(Denmark) R Andersen (Denmark) P Steffensen	8	14
(Indonesia) Y S Dasuki (Indonesia) R Sukmawan	21	22
(Malaysia) Chew C E (Malaysia) Hong C H	14	20

Quarter-finals
1	(Malaysia) Koo K K (Malaysia) Tan B H	21	21
(Indonesia) Y S Dasuki (Indonesia) R Sukmawan	12	5

==== Section 2 ====
First Round
3	(Japan) S Ikeda (Japan) S Sakamoto	19	16
(Chinese Taipei) Hu C-h (Chinese Taipei) Tsai C-s	21	21
Q2	(Malaysia) M R Abdul Latif (Malaysia) Chan P S	16	21	22
(Indonesia) S Budiarto (Indonesia) F Kurniawan	21	19	20
6	(Indonesia) H A Gunawan (Indonesia) J Riyadi	16	21	10
(South Korea) Cho G-w (South Korea) Han S-h	21	12	21
(Russia) V Durkin (Russia) A Nikolaenko	14	13
(Japan) K Kawaguchi (Japan) N Kawamae	21	21

Second Round
(Chinese Taipei) Hu C-h (Chinese Taipei) Tsai C-s	19	21	21
Q2	(Malaysia) M R Abdul Latif (Malaysia) Chan P S	21	16	19
(South Korea) Cho G-w (South Korea) Han S-h	21	11	21
(Japan) K Kawaguchi (Japan) N Kawamae	15	21	17

Quarter-finals
(Chinese Taipei) Hu C-h (Chinese Taipei) Tsai C-s	21	17	18
(South Korea) Cho G-w (South Korea) Han S-h	18	21	21

=== Bottom half ===
==== Section 3 ====
First Round
(Germany) K Hopp (Germany) I Kindervater	15	15
Q4	(South Korea) Ko S-h (South Korea) Kwon Y-g	21	21
(Australia) R Smith (Australia) G Warfe	15	16
5	(Japan) K Masuda (Japan) T Ōtsuka	21	21
(Chinese Taipei) Fang C-m (Chinese Taipei) Lee S-m	15	12
(India) R Kumar K. T. (India) S Thomas	21	21
(Chinese Taipei) Chien Y-h (Chinese Taipei) Lin Y-l	12	12
4	(Hong Kong) A S Njoto (Hong Kong) Y H Wiratama	21	21

Second Round
Q4	(South Korea) Ko S-h (South Korea) Kwon Y-g	21	16	19
5	(Japan) K Masuda (Japan) T Ōtsuka	14	21	21
(India) R Kumar K. T. (India) S Thomas	22	16
4	(Hong Kong) A S Njoto (Hong Kong) Y H Wiratama	24	21

Quarter-finals
5	(Japan) K Masuda (Japan) T Ōtsuka	19	24	21
4	(Hong Kong) A S Njoto (Hong Kong) Y H Wiratama	21	22	23

==== Section 4 ====
First Round
Q3	(Thailand) S Anugritayawon (Thailand) T Panvisvas	21	21
(France) M Popov (France) S Stoyanov	13	16
(Malaysia) Gan T C (Malaysia) R Lin W F	18	21	13
8	(Indonesia) L Hadiyanto (Indonesia) A Yulianto	21	18	21
(Malaysia) A Azahar (Malaysia) Goh Y J	12	8
(China) Guo ZD (China) Xie ZB	21	21
(Malaysia) Chan C M (Malaysia) Hoon T H	11	16
2	(Indonesia) C Wijaya (United States) T Gunawan	21	21

Second Round
Q3	(Thailand) S Anugritayawon (Thailand) T Panvisvas	15	21	15
8	(Indonesia) L Hadiyanto (Indonesia) A Yulianto	21	17	21
(China) Guo ZD (China) Xie ZB	21	21
2	(Indonesia) C Wijaya (United States) T Gunawan	16	16

Quarter-finals
8	(Indonesia) L Hadiyanto (Indonesia) A Yulianto	21	15	17
(China) Guo ZD (China) Xie ZB	18	21	21

== Women's doubles ==
=== Seeds ===
1. (Chinese Taipei) Cheng Wen-hsing / Chien Yu-chin (champions)
2. (Japan) Kumiko Ogura / Reiko Shiota (first round)
3. (China) Yang Wei / Zhao Tingting (quarter-finals)
4. (Indonesia) Rani Mundiasti / Endang Nursugianti (quarter-finals)
5. (Japan) Aki Akao / Tomomi Matsuda (withdrew)
6. (Japan) Miyuki Maeda / Satoko Suetsuna (semi-finals)
7. (Germany) Nicole Grether / Juliane Schenk (first round)
8. (Thailand) Duanganong Aroonkesorn / Kunchala Voravichitchaikul (first round)

=== Finals ===
Semi-finals
1	(Chinese Taipei) Cheng Wen-hsing (Chinese Taipei) Chien Yu-chin	21	24
(Indonesia) Jo Novita (Indonesia) Greysia Polii	17	22
6	(Japan) Miyuki Maeda (Japan) Satoko Suetsuna	12	21	9
(China) Pan Pan (China) Tian Qing	21	11	21

Final
1	(Chinese Taipei) Cheng Wen-hsing (Chinese Taipei) Chien Yu-chin	22	21
(China) Pan Pan (China) Tian Qing	20	14

=== Top half ===
==== Section 1 ====
First Round
1	(Chinese Taipei) Cheng W-h (Chinese Taipei) Chien Y-c	21	21
(Russia) E Ananina (Russia) A Russkikh	18	19
(Malaysia) A A Anscelly (Malaysia) Chon S C	21	21
(Philippines) Rac Guerrero (Philippines) Raq Guerrero	9	17
PFQ	(Singapore) Li L (Singapore) Xing AY	7	8
(Indonesia) V Marissa (Indonesia) L Natsir	21	21
(India) A Balan (India) S Nehwal	14	14
(Indonesia) S P Irawati (Indonesia) M Jauhari	21	21

Second Round
1	(Chinese Taipei) Cheng W-h (Chinese Taipei) Chien Y-c	21	21
(Malaysia) A A Anscelly (Malaysia) Chon S C	12	17
(Indonesia) V Marissa (Indonesia) L Natsir	19	21	21
(Indonesia) S P Irawati (Indonesia) M Jauhari	21	11	10

Quarter-finals
1	(Chinese Taipei) Cheng W-h (Chinese Taipei) Chien Y-c	21	15	21
(Indonesia) V Marissa (Indonesia) L Natsir	17	21	12

==== Section 2 ====
First Round
3	(China) Yang W (China) Zhao TT	21	21
PFQ	(Philippines) T T Chan (Philippines) I Chiu	10	4
(Chinese Taipei) Chang L-y (Chinese Taipei) Chang Y-l	19	10
(France) É Eymard (France) W Rahmawati	21	21
8	(Thailand) D Aroonkesorn (Thailand) K Voravichitchaikul	16	21	13
(South Korea) Hwang Y-m (South Korea) Sung I-j	21	18	21
(Indonesia) J Novita (Indonesia) G Polii	18	21	21
(Malaysia) N S Abdul Latif (Malaysia) Lim Y L	21	6	14

Second Round
3	(China) Yang W (China) Zhao TT	21	21
(France) É Eymard (France) W Rahmawati	6	4
(South Korea) Hwang Y-m (South Korea) Sung I-j	12	21	17
(Indonesia) J Novita (Indonesia) G Polii	21	16	21

Quarter-finals
3	(China) Yang W (China) Zhao TT	23	22
(Indonesia) J Novita (Indonesia) G Polii	25	24

=== Bottom half ===
==== Section 3 ====
First Round
Q1
(India) J Gutta (India) S Kurien	w	/	o
(Hong Kong) Chau H W (Hong Kong) Koon W C	8	7
6	(Japan) M Maeda (Japan) S Suetsuna	21	21
(Indonesia) Wang LL (Philippines) K Suncion	9	11
(Russia) V Sorokina (Russia) N Vislova	21	21
(Malaysia) Lim P S (Malaysia) J Quay	19	18
4	(Indonesia) R Mundiasti (Indonesia) E Nursugianti	21	21

Second Round
(India) J Gutta (India) S Kurien	24	10	14
6	(Japan) M Maeda (Japan) S Suetsuna	22	21	21
(Russia) V Sorokina (Russia) N Vislova	21	19	12
4	(Indonesia) R Mundiasti (Indonesia) E Nursugianti	16	21	21

Quarter-finals
6	(Japan) M Maeda (Japan) S Suetsuna	21	21
4	(Indonesia) R Mundiasti (Indonesia) E Nursugianti	16	15

==== Section 4 ====
First Round
(Indonesia) N K Maheswari (Indonesia) L Nurlita	21	21
(Thailand) S Chansrisukot (Thailand) M Meemeak	14	19
(China) Pan P (China) Tian Q	21	21
7	(Germany) N Grether (Germany) J Schenk	18	9
(South Korea) Ha J-e (South Korea) Kim M-j	21	21
PFQ	(Switzerland) G Djajawasito (Switzerland) T Pelling	12	4
(Chinese Taipei) Chou C-c (Chinese Taipei) Ku P-t	21	27
2	(Japan) K Ogura (Japan) R Shiota	16	25

Second Round
(Indonesia) N K Maheswari (Indonesia) L Nurlita	21	13	16
(China) Pan P (China) Tian Q	15	21	21
(South Korea) Ha J-e (South Korea) Kim M-j	9	18
(Chinese Taipei) Chou C-c (Chinese Taipei) Ku P-t	21	21

Quarter-finals
(China) Pan P (China) Tian Q	21	21
(Chinese Taipei) Chou C-c (Chinese Taipei) Ku P-t	11	13

== Mixed doubles ==
=== Seeds ===
1. (Indonesia) Nova Widianto / Liliyana Natsir (champions)
2. (Indonesia) Flandy Limpele / Vita Marissa (semi-finals)
3. (New Zealand) Daniel Shirley / (Malaysia) Joanne Quay (first round)
4. (Germany) Ingo Kindervater / Kathrin Piotrowski (first round)
5. (South Korea) Han Sang-hoon / Hwang Yu-mi (final)
6. (China) Zhang Jun / Zhao Tingting (withdrew)
7. (Indonesia) Devin Lahardi Fitriawan / Lita Nurlita (quarter-finals)
8. (Indonesia) Muhammad Rijal / Greysia Polii (second round)

=== Finals ===
Semi-finals
1	(Indonesia) Nova Widianto (Indonesia) Liliyana Natsir	21	21
(Thailand) Songphon Anugritayawon (Thailand) Kunchala Voravichitchaikul	14	18
5	(South Korea) Han Sang-hoon (South Korea) Hwang Yu-mi	23	11	21
2	(Indonesia) Flandy Limpele (Indonesia) Vita Marissa	21	21	19

Final
1	(Indonesia) Nova Widianto (Indonesia) Liliyana Natsir	21	21
5	(South Korea) Han Sang-hoon (South Korea) Hwang Yu-mi	17	13

=== Top half ===
==== Section 1 ====
First Round
1	(Indonesia) N Widianto (Indonesia) L Natsir	21	21
(Hong Kong) A T Putra (Hong Kong) Chau H W	17	12
Q1	(Indonesia) A Nugroho (Indonesia) N K Maheswari	15	14
(Germany) K Hopp (Germany) B Overzier	21	21
7	(Indonesia) D L Fitriawan (Indonesia) L Nurlita	21	21
(New Zealand) C Cooper (New Zealand) R Flavell	10	7
(Japan) K Masuda (Japan) M Maeda	21	21
(Australia) R Smith (Australia) T Luiz	12	11

Second Round
1	(Indonesia) N Widianto (Indonesia) L Natsir	21	21
(Germany) K Hopp (Germany) B Overzier	13	8
7	(Indonesia) D L Fitriawan (Indonesia) L Nurlita	21	21
(Japan) K Masuda (Japan) M Maeda	17	19

Quarter-finals
1	(Indonesia) N Widianto (Indonesia) L Natsir	21	21
7	(Indonesia) D L Fitriawan (Indonesia) L Nurlita	17	17

==== Section 2 ====
First Round
3	(New Zealand) D Shirley (Malaysia) J Quay	21	14	19
(South Korea) Yoo Y-s (South Korea) Kim M-j	13	21	21
(Malaysia) Chan P S (Malaysia) N S Abdul Latif	14	21	13
(Russia) V Durkin (Russia) V Sorokina	21	15	21
PFQ	(Chinese Taipei) Tsai C-h (Chinese Taipei) Cheng S-c	21	18	17
Q3	(India) V Diju (India) A Balan	14	21	21
(Thailand) S Anugritayawon (Thailand) K Voravichitchaikul	17	21	21
(Chinese Taipei) Chen H-l (Chinese Taipei) Chou C-c	21	10	14

Second Round
(South Korea) Yoo Y-s (South Korea) Kim M-j	19	17
(Russia) V Durkin (Russia) V Sorokina	21	21
Q3	(India) V Diju (India) A Balan	15	18
(Thailand) S Anugritayawon (Thailand) K Voravichitchaikul	21	21

Quarter-finals
(Russia) V Durkin (Russia) V Sorokina	23	11	17
(Thailand) S Anugritayawon (Thailand) K Voravichitchaikul	21	21	21

=== Bottom half ===
==== Section 3 ====
First Round
(Denmark) R Andersen (Russia) A Russkikh	21	12	26
(Russia) A Nikolaenko (Russia) N Vislova	16	21	24
(Japan) T Ōtsuka (Japan) S Suetsuna	16	16
5	(South Korea) Han S-h (South Korea) Hwang Y-m	21	21
(Philippines) Kennevic Asuncion (Philippines) Kennie Asuncion	21	21
(Portugal) A Paixão (Portugal) F Lamy	13	17
(Chinese Taipei) Hsieh Y-h (Chinese Taipei) Chien Y-c	21	21
4	(Germany) I Kindervater (Germany) K Piotrowski	17	14

Second Round
(Denmark) R Andersen (Russia) A Russkikh	16	14
5	(South Korea) Han S-h (South Korea) Hwang Y-m	21	21
(Philippines) Kennevic Asuncion (Philippines) Kennie Asuncion	16	16
(Chinese Taipei) Hsieh Y-h (Chinese Taipei) Chien Y-c	21	21

Quarter-finals
5	(South Korea) Han S-h (South Korea) Hwang Y-m	12	21	22
(Chinese Taipei) Hsieh Y-h (Chinese Taipei) Chien Y-c	21	15	20

==== Section 4 ====
First Round
Q2	(South Korea) Kwon Y-g (South Korea) Ha J-e	9	14
(Chinese Taipei) Fang C-m (Chinese Taipei) Cheng W-h	21	21
Q4	(Indonesia) T Kusharjanto (Indonesia) M Timur	21	16	17
8	(Indonesia) M Rijal (Indonesia) G Polii	19	21	21
(Hong Kong) Hui W H (Hong Kong) Koon W C	20	21	21
(France) S Stoyanov (France) É Eymard	22	15	14
(Malaysia) Chang H P (Malaysia) A A Anscelly	16	18
2	(Indonesia) F Limpele (Indonesia) V Marissa	21	21

Second Round
(Chinese Taipei) Fang C-m (Chinese Taipei) Cheng W-h	21	21
8	(Indonesia) M Rijal (Indonesia) G Polii	18	16
(Hong Kong) Hui W H (Hong Kong) Koon W C	13	6
2	(Indonesia) F Limpele (Indonesia) V Marissa	21	21

Quarter-finals
(Chinese Taipei) Fang C-m (Chinese Taipei) Cheng W-h	14	21	14
2	(Indonesia) F Limpele (Indonesia) V Marissa	21	15	21

Preceded by 2007 Thailand Open Grand Prix Gold	2007 BWF Grand Prix Gold and Grand Prix; 2007 BWF season	Succeeded by 2007 U.S. Open Grand Prix
