= 2007 Thailand Open Grand Prix Gold =

Tournament details
- Dates: July 3, 2007 – July 8, 2007
- Edition: 21st
- Level: Grand Prix Gold
- Total prize money: US$120,000
- Venue: Nimibutr Stadium
- Location: Bangkok, Thailand

Champions
- Men's singles: (China) Chen Hong
- Women's singles: (China) Zhu Lin
- Men's doubles: (South Korea) Lee Jae-jin (South Korea) Hwang Ji-man
- Women's doubles: (China) Gao Ling (China) Huang Sui
- Mixed doubles: (China) He Hanbin (China) Yu Yang

The 2007 Thailand Open Grand Prix Gold (officially known as the SCG Thailand Open 2007 for sponsorship reasons) was a badminton tournament which took place in Bangkok, Thailand from 3 to 8 July 2007. It had a total purse of $120,000.

== Tournament ==
The 2007 Thailand Open Grand Prix Gold was the third tournament of the 2007 BWF Grand Prix Gold and Grand Prix and also part of the Thailand Open championships which has been held since 1984. This tournament was organized by the Badminton Association of Thailand and sanctioned by the BWF.

=== Venue ===
This international tournament was held at Nimibutr Stadium in Bangkok, Thailand.

=== Point distribution ===
Below is the point distribution for each phase of the tournament based on the BWF points system for the BWF Grand Prix Gold event.

Winner	Runner-up	3/4	5/8	9/16	17/32	33/64	65/128	129/256
7,000	5,950	4,900	3,850	2,750	1,670	660	320	130

=== Prize money ===
The total prize money for this tournament was US$120,000. Distribution of prize money was in accordance with BWF regulations.

Event	Winner	Finals	Semi-finals	Quarter-finals	Last 16
Singles	$9,000	$4,560	$1,740	$720	$420
Doubles	$9,480	$4,560	$1,680	$870	$450

== Men's singles ==
=== Seeds ===
1. (China) Chen Jin (semi-finals)
2. (China) Chen Hong (champion)
3. (China) Chen Yu (withdrew)
4. (Thailand) Boonsak Ponsana (final)
5. (Indonesia) Sony Dwi Kuncoro (withdrew)
6. (England) Andrew Smith (first round)
7. (Malaysia) Lee Tsuen Seng (quarter-finals)
8. (Malaysia) Sairul Amar Ayob (first round)
9. (Malaysia) Roslin Hashim (second round)
10. (Hong Kong) Ng Wei (semi-finals)
11. (Hong Kong) Chan Yan Kit (first round)
12. (Wales) Richard Vaughan (withdrew)
13. (Indonesia) Simon Santoso (third round)
14. (Denmark) Joachim Persson (second round)
15. (Malaysia) Wong Choong Hann (third round)
16. (Netherlands) Eric Pang (second round)

=== Finals ===
Semi-finals
1	(China) Chen Jin	21	18	13
4	(Thailand) Boonsak Ponsana	19	21	21
10	(Hong Kong) Ng Wei	18	9
2	(China) Chen Hong	21	21

Final
4	(Thailand) Boonsak Ponsana	14	21	21
2	(China) Chen Hong	21	11	23

=== Top half ===
==== Section 1 ====
First Round
1	(China) Chen J	21	21
(Malaysia) Tan C S	9	15
(Canada) S Wojcikikiewicz	19	18
(New Zealand) J Moody	21	21
11	(Hong Kong) Chan Y K	13	17
(India) C Anand	21	21
(Italy) K Raffeiner	8	8
(Republic of Ireland) S Evans	21	21
6	(England) A Smith	18	15
(Austria) J Koch	21	21
(Slovenia) L Petrič	14	14
Q1	(Japan) H Endo	21	21
PFQ	(Chinese Taipei) Hsieh Y-h	19	21	21
(Indonesia) A Y W Hartanto	21	16	19
(Indonesia) T Sugiarto	21	19	21
(Malaysia) Liew D	10	21	14

Second Round
1	(China) Chen J	21	21
(New Zealand) J Moody	10	15
(India) C Anand	15	16
(Republic of Ireland) S Evans	21	21
(Austria) J Koch	21	17	13
Q1	(Japan) H Endo	19	21	21
PFQ	(Chinese Taipei) Hsieh Y-h	22	21	11
(Indonesia) T Sugiarto	24	18	21

Third Round
1	(China) Chen J	21	21
(Republic of Ireland) S Evans	12	7
Q1	(Japan) H Endo	21	11	17
(Indonesia) T Sugiarto	13	21	21

Quarter-finals
1	(China) Chen J	21	21
(Indonesia) T Sugiarto	5	14

==== Section 2 ====
First Round
4	(Thailand) B Ponsana	21	21
(Malaysia) Pei W C	12	13
(South Korea) Lee H-i	21	21
(Spain) J A Crespo	9	2
13	(Indonesia) S Santoso	21	21
(Scotland) A Casey	7	14
(Iran) K Mehrabi	10	10
Q4	(Malaysia) M A Abdul Latif	21	21
8	(Malaysia) S A Ayob	20	22
(Indonesia) A K Tedjono	24	22
Q7	(South Korea) Park T-s	18	21	21
(Japan) K Tago	21	5	19
15	(Malaysia) Wong C H	21	21
(Thailand) T Saensomboonsuk	14	14
PFQ	(Malaysia) B Wong	13	12
(Malaysia) Y Khrishnan	21	21

Second Round
4	(Thailand) B Ponsana	28	21	21
(South Korea) Lee H-i	30	16	16
(Indonesia) S Santoso	21	21
Q4	(Malaysia) M A Abdul Latif	11	13
(Indonesia) A K Tedjono	10	15
Q7	(South Korea) Park T-s	21	21
15	(Malaysia) Wong C H	19	21	24
(Malaysia) Y Khrishnan	21	19	22

Third Round
4	(Thailand) B Ponsana	21	21
13	(Indonesia) S Santoso	16	19
Q7	(South Korea) Park T-s	21	13	21
15	(Malaysia) Wong C H	12	21	14

Quarter-finals
4	(Thailand) B Ponsana	18	21	21
Q7	(South Korea) Park T-s	21	13	9

=== Bottom half ===
==== Section 3 ====
First Round
(Philippines) K Asuncion	15	4
(Vietnam) Nguyễn T M	21	21
(England) N Kidd	19	13
14	(Denmark) J Persson	21	21
(India) A Sridhar	21	21
(Indonesia) A Adituawarman	16	17
(India) Parupalli K	19	21	11
PFQ	(Malaysia) K Lim	21	13	21
(Canada) B Milroy	18	16
(Switzerland) C Bösiger	21	21
(India) A Jayaram	21	14	10
10	(Hong Kong) Ng W	19	21	21
Q3	(Thailand) S Kaweenanthawong	21	15	21
(Malaysia) Chong W F	16	21	10
(Spain) P Abián	21	21
PFQ	(Hungary) K Horváth	8	16

Second Round
(Vietnam) Nguyễn T M	21	19	21
14	(Denmark) J Persson	12	21	17
(India) A Sridhar	21	21
PFQ	(Malaysia) K Lim	17	11
(Switzerland) C Bösiger	21	12	11
10	(Hong Kong) Ng W	18	21	21
Q3	(Thailand) S Kaweenanthawong	18	20
(Spain) P Abián	21	22

Third Round
(Vietnam) Nguyễn T M	14	14
(India) A Sridhar	21	21
10	(Hong Kong) Ng W	21	21
(Spain) P Abián	9	9

Quarter-finals
(India) A Sridhar	21	18	4
10	(Hong Kong) Ng W	19	21	21

==== Section 4 ====
First Round
(Thailand) P Sapkulchananart	21	17	21
Q5	(Malaysia) Chong L Q	17	21	12
(Slovakia) M Matejka	4	10
9	(Malaysia) R Hashim	21	21
Q8	(Japan) H Saeki	21	21
(Portugal) A Paixão	7	14
Q6	(Indonesia) D H Rumbaka	8	23	9
7	(Malaysia) Lee T S	21	21	21
(India) N Kanetkar	21	15	10
PFQ	(Chinese Taipei) Liao S-s	7	21	21
(India) A Pawar	11	15
16	(Netherlands) E Pang	21	21
(Germany) R Spitko	21	21
Q2	(Malaysia) Lim F Y	15	15
(Czech Republic) P Koukal	20	7
2	(China) Chen H	22	21

Second Round
(Thailand) P Sapkulchananart	18	19
9	(Malaysia) R Hashim	21	21
Q8	(Japan) H Saeki	17	11
7	(Malaysia) Lee T S	21	21
PFQ	(Chinese Taipei) Liao S-s	21	19	21
16	(Netherlands) E Pang	16	21	17
(Germany) R Spitko	13	18
2	(China) Chen H	21	21

Third Round
9	(Malaysia) R Hashim	22	19	13
7	(Malaysia) Lee T S	20	21	21
PFQ	(Chinese Taipei) Liao S-s	14	13
2	(China) Chen H	21	21

Quarter-finals
7	(Malaysia) Lee T S	24	14	16
2	(China) Chen H	22	21	21

== Women's singles ==
=== Seeds ===
1. (China) Zhu Lin (champion)
2. (Germany) Xu Huaiwen (quarter-finals)
3. (France) Pi Hongyan (semi-finals)
4. (Netherlands) Yao Jie (first round)
5. (China) Lu Lan (second round)
6. (Bulgaria) Petya Nedelcheva (first round)
7. (Malaysia) Wong Mew Choo (withdrew)
8. (Hong Kong) Yip Pui Yin (second round)

=== Finals ===
Semi-finals
1	(China) Zhu Lin	21	21
3	(France) Pi Hongyan	16	18
(Singapore) Xing Aiying	21	13	9
Q4	(Hong Kong) Zhou Mi	17	21	21

Final
1	(China) Zhu Lin	20	21	21
Q4	(Hong Kong) Zhou Mi	22	5	14

=== Top half ===
==== Section 1 ====
First Round
1	(China) Zhu L	21	21
(Thailand) S Chansrisukot	14	15
Q1	(Indonesia) M F Kusumastuti	21	11	21
(Finland) A Nieminen	18	21	19
PFQ	(Slovenia) M Tvrdy	14	13
PFQ	(India) T Murgunde	21	21
(Iceland) R Ingólfsdóttir	9	8
(Germany) J Schenk	21	21

Second Round
1	(China) Zhu L	19	21	21
Q1	(Indonesia) M F Kusumastuti	21	16	12
PFQ	(India) T Murgunde	14	4^{r}
(Germany) J Schenk	21	13

Quarter-finals
1	(China) Zhu L	21	12	21
(Germany) J Schenk	18	21	18

==== Section 2 ====
First Round
3	(France) Pi HY	21	21
(Austria) S Prutsch	18	7
(Singapore) Li L	8	21	21
Q2	(Thailand) P Buranaprasertsuk	21	18	18
6	(Bulgaria) P Nedelcheva	11	18
(England) T Hallam	21	21
Q3	(Singapore) Gu J	11	23
(Chinese Taipei) Cheng S-c	21	25

Second Round
3	(France) Pi HY	21	21
(Singapore) Li L	12	7
(England) T Hallam	21	20	21
(Chinese Taipei) Cheng S-c	13	22	13

Quarter-finals
3	(France) Pi HY	21	21
(England) T Hallam	13	14

=== Bottom half ===
==== Section 3 ====
First Round
(Thailand) S Ponsana	21	14	21
(Canada) A Rice	10	21	12
(South Korea) Hwang H-y	23	17	18
8	(Hong Kong) Yip P Y	21	21	21
(Singapore) Xing AY	21	21
(India) S Nehwal	13	16
(Malaysia) J Wong P X	21	18	22
4	(Netherlands) Yao J	15	21	20

Second Round
(Thailand) S Ponsana	21	21
8	(Hong Kong) Yip P Y	19	12
(Singapore) Xing AY	21	21
(Malaysia) J Wong P X	18	12

Quarter-finals
(Thailand) S Ponsana	14	13
(Singapore) Xing AY	21	21

==== Section 4 ====
First Round
(New Zealand) R Hindley	7	11
Q4	(Hong Kong) Zhou M	21	21
(Chinese Taipei) Pai M-j	17	8
5	(China) Lu L	21	21
(Italy) A Allegrini	13	13
(Sweden) S Persson	21	21
(Thailand) M Meemeak	9	20
2	(Germany) Xu HW	21	22

Second Round
Q4	(Hong Kong) Zhou M	21	21
5	(China) Lu L	16	15
(Sweden) S Persson	11	23	11
2	(Germany) Xu HW	21	21	21

Quarter-finals
Q4	(Hong Kong) Zhou M	21	10	21
2	(Germany) Xu HW	18	21	14

== Men's doubles ==
=== Seeds ===
1. (Malaysia) Koo Kien Keat / Tan Boon Heong (withdrew)
2. (Malaysia) Choong Tan Fook / Lee Wan Wah (quarter-finals)
3. (South Korea) Jung Jae-sung / Lee Yong-dae (final)
4. (South Korea) Lee Jae-jin / Hwang Ji-man (champions)
5. (Malaysia) Mohd Zakry Abdul Latif / Mohd Fairuzizuan Mohd Tazari (second round)
6. (Hong Kong) Albertus Susanto Njoto / Yohan Hadikusumo Wiratama (quarter-finals)
7. (Malaysia) Tan Bin Shen / Ong Soon Hock (first round)
8. (Denmark) Simon Mollyhus / Anders Kristiansen (second round)

=== Finals ===
Semi-finals
(Malaysia) Gan Teik Chai (Malaysia) Robert Lin Woon Fui	19	18
4	(South Korea) Lee Jae-jin (South Korea) Hwang Ji-man	21	21
3	(South Korea) Jung Jae-sung (South Korea) Lee Yong-dae	21	21
Q3	(Thailand) Tesana Panvisvas (Thailand) Sudket Prapakamol	18	15

Final
4	(South Korea) Lee Jae-jin (South Korea) Hwang Ji-man	21	19	21
3	(South Korea) Jung Jae-sung (South Korea) Lee Yong-dae	19	21	9

=== Top half ===
==== Section 1 ====
First Round
PFQ	(England) C Langridge (England) R Eidestedt	21	9	21
(Chinese Taipei) Fang C-m (Chinese Taipei) Lee S-m	13	21	18
Q4	(Indonesia) A Y Wirawan (Indonesia) W Windarto	20	19
(United States) H Bach (United States) K Malaythong	22	21
8	(Denmark) S Mollyhus (Denmark) A Kristiansen	23	17	22
(Malaysia) Chan C M (Malaysia) Hoon T H	21	21	20
(Malaysia) Gan T C (Malaysia) R Lin W F	21	21
(Germany) K Hopp (Germany) I Kindervater	10	14

Second Round
PFQ	(England) C Langridge (England) R Eidestedt	21	12	12
(United States) H Bach (United States) K Malaythong	19	21	21
8	(Denmark) S Mollyhus (Denmark) A Kristiansen	12	21	16
(Malaysia) Gan T C (Malaysia) R Lin W F	21	10	21

Quarter-finals
(United States) H Bach (United States) K Malaythong	16	21	10
(Malaysia) Gan T C (Malaysia) R Lin W F	21	17	21

==== Section 2 ====
First Round
4	(South Korea) Lee J-j (South Korea) Hwang J-m	21	20	21
Q2	(Malaysia) Lim K W (Malaysia) Mak H C	7	22	17
(Indonesia) L Hadiyanto (Indonesia) A Yulianto	21	21
(Chinese Taipei) Chien Y-h (Chinese Taipei) Lin Y-l	5	14
6	(Hong Kong) A S Njoto (Hong Kong) Y H Wiratama	21	21
(France) S Stoyanov (France) M Popov	19	16
(Canada) M Beres (Canada) W Milroy	21	18	21
(England) R Adcock (England) R Middleton	16	21	13

Second Round
4	(South Korea) Lee J-j (South Korea) Hwang J-m	21	27
(Indonesia) L Hadiyanto (Indonesia) A Yulianto	15	25
6	(Hong Kong) A S Njoto (Hong Kong) Y H Wiratama	21	21
(Canada) M Beres (Canada) W Milroy	16	17

Quarter-finals
4	(South Korea) Lee J-j (South Korea) Hwang J-m	21	23
6	(Hong Kong) A S Njoto (Hong Kong) Y H Wiratama	17	21

=== Bottom half ===
==== Section 3 ====
First Round
(Germany) R Spitko (Germany) M Fuchs	10	21	18
(China) Shen Y (China) He HB	21	19	21
(Indonesia) B Septano (Indonesia) M Ahsan	21	14	21
7	(Malaysia) Tan B S (Malaysia) Ong S H	19	21	14
(Denmark) R Mangor Andersen (Denmark) P Buur Steffensen	17	21	17
(South Korea) Han S-h (South Korea) Cho G-w	21	14	21
(Indonesia) R Sukmawan (Indonesia) Y S Dasuki	21	15	14
3	(South Korea) Jung J-s (South Korea) Lee Y-d	15	21	21

Second Round
(China) Shen Y (China) He HB	14	20
(Indonesia) B Septano (Indonesia) M Ahsan	21	22
(South Korea) Han S-h (South Korea) Cho G-w	12	12
3	(South Korea) Jung J-s (South Korea) Lee Y-d	21	21

Quarter-finals
(Indonesia) B Septano (Indonesia) M Ahsan	14	16
3	(South Korea) Jung J-s (South Korea) Lee Y-d	21	21

==== Section 4 ====
First Round
Q3	(Thailand) T Panvisvas (Thailand) S Prapakamol	21	18	21
(Hong Kong) Hoi W H (Hong Kong) A T Putra	14	21	12
(Chinese Taipei) Tsai C-h (Chinese Taipei) Hu C-s	17	15
5	(Malaysia) M Z Abdul Latif (Malaysia) M F Mohd Tazari	21	21
PFQ	(India) R Kumar K. T. (India) S Thomas	21	18	23
Q1	(Thailand) P Ngernsrisuk (Thailand) N Saengsila	18	21	25
(Indonesia) S Budiarto (Indonesia) F Kurniawan	16	21	11
2	(Malaysia) Choong T F (Malaysia) Lee W W	21	19	21

Second Round
Q3	(Thailand) T Panvisvas (Thailand) S Prapakamol	21	15	21
5	(Malaysia) M Z Abdul Latif (Malaysia) M F Mohd Tazari	18	21	19
Q3	(Thailand) P Ngernsrisuk (Thailand) N Saengsila	21	17
2	(Malaysia) Choong T F (Malaysia) Lee W W	23	21

Quarter-finals
Q3	(Thailand) T Panvisvas (Thailand) S Prapakamol	21	19	21
2	(Malaysia) Choong T F (Malaysia) Lee W W	19	21	18

== Women's doubles ==
=== Seeds ===
1. (China) Gao Ling / Huang Sui (champions)
2. (South Korea) Lee Kyung-won / Lee Hyo-jung (semi-finals)
3. (Chinese Taipei) Chien Yu-chin / Cheng Wen-hsing (semi-finals)
4. (China) Du Jing / Yu Yang (final)
5. (Malaysia) Wong Pei Tty / Chin Eei Hui (quarter-finals)
6. (Germany) Nicole Grether / Juliane Schenk (quarter-finals)
7. (Denmark) Lena Frier Kristiansen / Kamilla Rytter Juhl (second round)
8. (Thailand) Duanganong Aroonkesorn / Kunchala Voravichitchaikul (quarter-finals)

=== Finals ===
Semi-finals
1	(China) Gao Ling (China) Huang Sui	21	21
3	(Chinese Taipei) Chien Yu-chin (Chinese Taipei) Cheng Wen-hsing	10	16
4	(China) Du Jing (China) Yu Yang	21	21
2	(South Korea) Lee Kyung-won (South Korea) Lee Hyo-jung	14	17

Final
1	(China) Gao Ling (China) Huang Sui	w	/	o
4	(China) Du Jing (China) Yu Yang

=== Top half ===
==== Section 1 ====
First Round
1	(China) Gao L (China) Huang S	21	21
(Sweden) J Persson (Sweden) E Bergblom	10	13
(Singapore) V Neo (Singapore) S M Sari	21	13
(Indonesia) J Novita (Indonesia) G Polii	23	21
8	(Thailand) D Aroonkesorn (Thailand) K Voravichitchaikul	21	21
(India) S Kurien (India) J Gutta	17	14
PFQ	(Chinese Taipei) Chang L-y (Chinese Taipei) Chen S-y	14	19
Q1	(Thailand) T Kleebyeesoon (Thailand) W Umpansuwan	21	21

Second Round
1	(China) Gao L (China) Huang S	21	21
(Indonesia) J Novita (Indonesia) G Polii	16	12
8	(Thailand) D Aroonkesorn (Thailand) K Voravichitchaikul	21	21
Q1	(Thailand) T Kleebyeesoon (Thailand) W Umpansuwan	12	9

Quarter-finals
1	(China) Gao L (China) Huang S	21	21
8	(Thailand) D Aroonkesorn (Thailand) K Voravichitchaikul	13	7

==== Section 2 ====
First Round
3	(Chinese Taipei) Chien Y-c (Chinese Taipei) Cheng W-h	21	21
(England) J Nicholas (England) N Munt	8	13
(South Korea) Jung Y-k (South Korea) Hoon S-j	21	21
Q4	(Thailand) S Amitrapai (Thailand) V Gatenakorn	18	6
5	(Malaysia) Wong P T (Malaysia) Chin E H	21	21
(Indonesia) R P Dili (Indonesia) Yulianti	16	12
Q2	(Singapore) Yao L (Singapore) F Liu	18	21	21
(Malaysia) Woon K W (Malaysia) Goh L Y	21	14	16

Second Round
3	(Chinese Taipei) Chien Y-c (Chinese Taipei) Cheng W-h	21	21
(South Korea) Jung Y-k (South Korea) Hoon S-j	9	10
5	(Malaysia) Wong P T (Malaysia) Chin E H	21	21
Q2	(Singapore) Yao L (Singapore) F Liu	12	17

Quarter-finals
3	(Chinese Taipei) Chien Y-c (Chinese Taipei) Cheng W-h	21	21
5	(Malaysia) Wong P T (Malaysia) Chin E H	18	16

=== Bottom half ===
==== Section 3 ====
First Round
(Hong Kong) Chau H W (Hong Kong) Koo W C	17	11
(Malaysia) Lim P S (Malaysia) J Quay	21	21
(Scotland) I Bankier (Scotland) E Mason	13	18
7	(Denmark) L Frier Kristiansen (Denmark) K Rytter Juhl	21	21
PFQ	(Thailand) S Chansrisukot (Thailand) M Meemeak	15	10
SUB	(Indonesia) N K Maheswari (Indonesia) L Nurlita	21	21
(Chinese Taipei) Chou C-c (Chinese Taipei) Ku P-t	13	19
4	(China) Du J (China) Yu Y	21	21

Second Round
(Malaysia) Lim P S (Malaysia) J Quay	21	21
7	(Denmark) L Frier Kristiansen (Denmark) K Rytter Juhl	9	12
SUB	(Indonesia) N K Maheswari (Indonesia) L Nurlita	6	21	16
4	(China) Du J (China) Yu Y	21	16	21

Quarter-finals
(Malaysia) Lim P S (Malaysia) J Quay	10	17
4	(China) Du J (China) Yu Y	21	21

==== Section 4 ====
First Round
Q3	(Chinese Taipei) Cheng H-y (Chinese Taipei) Chang Y-j	21	19	'21
(Germany) K Piotrowski (Germany) M Peiffer	8	21	11
(Malaysia) Fong C Y (Malaysia) Mooi H Y	20	11
6	(Germany) N Grether (Germany) J Schenk	22	21
(United States) E Lee (United States) M Mangkalakiri	12	15
SUB	(Malaysia) N S Abdul Latif (Malaysia) Lim Y L	21	21
(France) É Eymard (France) W Rahmawati	12	18
2	(South Korea) Lee K-w (South Korea) Lee H-j	21	21

Second Round
Q3	(Chinese Taipei) Cheng H-y (Chinese Taipei) Chang Y-j	16	12
6	(Germany) N Grether (Germany) J Schenk	21	21
SUB	(Malaysia) N S Abdul Latif (Malaysia) Lim Y L	13	3
2	(South Korea) Lee K-w (South Korea) Lee H-j	21	21

Quarter-finals
6	(Germany) N Grether (Germany) J Schenk	12	11
2	(South Korea) Lee K-w (South Korea) Lee H-j	21	21

== Mixed doubles ==
=== Seeds ===
1. (Thailand) Sudket Prapakamol / Saralee Thungthongkam (semi-finals)
2. (Denmark) Thomas Laybourn / Kamilla Rytter Juhl (semi-finals)
3. (China) He Hanbin / Yu Yang (champions)
4. (Germany) Ingo Kindervater / Kathrin Piotrowski (quarter-finals)
5. (South Korea) Han Sang-hoon / Hwang Yu-mi (final)
6. (Indonesia) Devin Lahardi Fitriawan / Lita Nurlita (quarter-finals)
7. (England) David Lindley / Suzanne Rayappan (quarter-finals)
8. (Germany) Kristof Hopp / Birgit Overzier (quarter-finals)

=== Finals ===
Semi-finals
1	(Thailand) Sudket Prapakamol (Thailand) Saralee Thungthongkam	18	21	21
3	(China) He Hanbin (China) Yu Yang	21	18	23
5	(South Korea) Han Sang-hoon (South Korea) Hwang Yu-mi	23	21
2	(Denmark) Thomas Laybourn (Denmark) Kamilla Rytter Juhl	21	14

Final
3	(China) He Hanbin (China) Yu Yang	21	21
5	(South Korea) Han Sang-hoon (South Korea) Hwang Yu-mi	12	14

=== Top half ===
==== Section 1 ====
First Round
1	(Thailand) S Prapakamol (Thailand) S Thungthongkam	21	21
Q4	(Malaysia) M R Abdul Latif (Malaysia) Chong S C	16	10
(New Zealand) C Cooper (New Zealand) R Flavell	22	21	16
(Malaysia) Tan W K (Malaysia) Woon K W	24	18	21
6	(Indonesia) D L Fitriawan (Indonesia) L Nurlita	21	21
(Hong Kong) A T Putra (Hong Kong) Koon W C	12	7
(Canada) M Beres (Canada) V Loker	18	15
(Chinese Taipei) Hsieh Y-h (Chinese Taipei) Chien Y-c	21	21

Second Round
1	(Thailand) S Prapakamol (Thailand) S Thungthongkam	21	21
(Malaysia) Tan W K (Malaysia) Woon K W	12	16
6	(Indonesia) D L Fitriawan (Indonesia) L Nurlita	21	24
(Chinese Taipei) Hsieh Y-h (Chinese Taipei) Chien Y-c	8	22

Quarter-finals
1	(Thailand) S Prapakamol (Thailand) S Thungthongkam	21	21
6	(Indonesia) D L Fitriawan (Indonesia) L Nurlita	16	17

==== Section 2 ====
First Round
3	(China) He HB (China) Yu Y	21	21
(South Korea) Hwang J-m (South Korea) Jung Y-k	9	12
Q2	(Thailand) T Lapoe (Thailand) S Amitrapai	21	17	21
PFQ	(Chinese Taipei) Fang C-m (Chinese Taipei) Chang Y-j	18	21	19
8	(Germany) K Hopp (Germany) B Overzier	21	21
(United States) K Malaythong (United States) M Mangkalakiri	14	15
(South Korea) Lee Y-d (South Korea) Lee H-j	21	22
(England) K Roebuck (England) N Munt	16	20

Second Round
3	(China) He HB (China) Yu Y	21	21
Q2	(Thailand) T Lapoe (Thailand) S Amitrapai	8	18
8	(Germany) K Hopp (Germany) B Overzier	21	21
(South Korea) Lee Y-d (South Korea) Lee H-j	18	18

Quarter-finals
3	(China) He HB (China) Yu Y	19	21	21
8	(Germany) K Hopp (Germany) B Overzier	21	15	17

=== Bottom half ===
==== Section 3 ====
First Round
(Thailand) S Anugritayawon (Thailand) K Voravichitchaikul	21	21
(Philippines) Kennevic Asuncion (Philippines) Kennie Asuncion	18	19
(England) R Middleton (Scotland) E Mason	9	11
5	(South Korea) Han S-h (South Korea) Hwang Y-m	21	21
Q3	(Malaysia) Lim K W (Malaysia) Ng H L	21	21
(Indonesia) L Lie (Indonesia) D T Permatasari	18	15
(United States) H Bach (United States) E Lee	21	13	15
4	(Germany) I Kindervater (Germany) K Piotrowski	18	21	21

Second Round
(Thailand) S Anugritayawon (Thailand) K Voravichitchaikul	20	21	10
5	(South Korea) Han S-h (South Korea) Hwang Y-m	22	16	21
Q3	(Malaysia) Lim K W (Malaysia) Ng H L	17	22
4	(Germany) I Kindervater (Germany) K Piotrowski	21	24

Quarter-finals
5	(South Korea) Han S-h (South Korea) Hwang Y-m	21	21
4	(Germany) I Kindervater (Germany) K Piotrowski	13	14

==== Section 4 ====
First Round
Q1	(Indonesia) A Nugroho (Indonesia) N K Maheswari	18	21	19
(Chinese Taipei) Chen H-l (Chinese Taipei) Chou C-c	21	15	21
SUB	(England) R Adcock (Scotland) I Bankier	14	21	14
7	(England) D Lindley (England) S Rayappan	21	18	21
(Indonesia) T Ahmad (Indonesia) Yulianti	21	21
SUB	(Malaysia) Chan P S (Malaysia) N S Abdul Latif	18	12
(France) S Stoyanov (France) É Eymard	21	20
2	(Denmark) T Laybourn (Denmark) K Rytter Juhl	23	22

Second Round
(Chinese Taipei) Chen H-l (Chinese Taipei) Chou C-c	14	24	18
7	(England) D Lindley (England) S Rayappan	21	22	21
(Indonesia) T Ahmad (Indonesia) Yulianti	18	21	10
2	(Denmark) T Laybourn (Denmark) K Rytter Juhl	21	16	21

Quarter-finals
7	(England) D Lindley (England) S Rayappan	10	14
2	(Denmark) T Laybourn (Denmark) K Rytter Juhl	21	21

Preceded by 2007 New Zealand Open Grand Prix	2007 BWF Grand Prix Gold and Grand Prix; 2007 BWF season	Succeeded by 2007 Philippines Open Grand Prix Gold
