= 2001 Asian Junior Badminton Championships =

Tournament details
- Dates: 8-14 July 2001
- Venue: Taipei Gymnasium
- Location: Taipei, Taiwan

The 2001 Asian Junior Badminton Championships were held in Taipei Gymnasium, Taipei, Taiwan from 8–14 July. South Korea won four titles in the individuals event in the girs' singles, boys' doubles, girls' doubles and mixed doubles event, and the boys' singles title won by the Indonesian player. Malaysia and South Korea clinched the boys' and girls' team event respectively.

== Medalists ==
Event	Gold	Silver	Bronze
Boys' teams	Malaysia; Gan Teik Chai; Kuan Beng Hong; Lin Woon Fui; Mohd Fairuzizuan Mohd Tazari; Mohd Zakry Abdul Latif	Chinese Taipei; Chao Chun-ken; Hsieh Yu-hsing; Wang Chia-min; Wang Yi-chieh; Wu Chun-wei	Indonesia; Andika Pradana Wicaksana; Ardiansyah; Devin Lahardi Fitriawan; Billy Gunawan; Titon Gustaman; Ruben Gordown Khosadalina; Markis Kido; Sony Dwi Kuncoro; Simon Santoso; Hendra Setiawan
Boys' teams	Malaysia; Gan Teik Chai; Kuan Beng Hong; Lin Woon Fui; Mohd Fairuzizuan Mohd Tazari; Mohd Zakry Abdul Latif	Chinese Taipei; Chao Chun-ken; Hsieh Yu-hsing; Wang Chia-min; Wang Yi-chieh; Wu Chun-wei	South Korea; Ahn Hyun-suk; Hwang Ji-man; Lee Jae-jin; Hong Seung-ki; Kim Dong-heon; Kim Taek-kyu; Moon Bo-kook; Park Sung-hwan
Girls' teams	South Korea; Ahn Yu-jin; Bae Seung-hee; Cho A-ra; Hwang Yu-mi; Jun Jae-youn; Kim Na-rae; Lee Yun-hwa; Seo Yoon-hee	Chinese Taipei; Cheng Hsiao-yun; Cheng Pei-ju; Cheng Shao-chieh; Chiu Yi-ju; Hsiao Chih-chium; Huang Chia-hsin; Huang Yi-fan; Lin Chiao-wen; Peng Hsiao-feng; Tseng Hsin-yi; Yang Chia-chen	Indonesia; Silvi Antarini; Dewi Tira Arisandi; Lina Marlina; Rani Mundiasti; Lita Nurlita; Liliyana Natsir; Endang Nursugianti
Girls' teams	South Korea; Ahn Yu-jin; Bae Seung-hee; Cho A-ra; Hwang Yu-mi; Jun Jae-youn; Kim Na-rae; Lee Yun-hwa; Seo Yoon-hee	Chinese Taipei; Cheng Hsiao-yun; Cheng Pei-ju; Cheng Shao-chieh; Chiu Yi-ju; Hsiao Chih-chium; Huang Chia-hsin; Huang Yi-fan; Lin Chiao-wen; Peng Hsiao-feng; Tseng Hsin-yi; Yang Chia-chen	Thailand; Duanganong Aroonkesorn; Anchisa Sangsuan; Sitee Phuksapaisalsilp; Salakjit Ponsana; Kunchala Voravichitchaikul
Boys' singles	(Indonesia) Ardiansyah	(Indonesia) Sony Dwi Kuncoro	(Indonesia) Andika Pradana Wicaksana
Boys' singles	(Indonesia) Ardiansyah	(Indonesia) Sony Dwi Kuncoro	(South Korea) Ahn Hyun-suk
Girls' singles	(South Korea) Jun Jae-youn	(South Korea) Seo Yoon-hee	(Indonesia) Silvi Antarini
Girls' singles	(South Korea) Jun Jae-youn	(South Korea) Seo Yoon-hee	(South Korea) Bae Seung-hee
Boys' doubles	(South Korea) Hwang Ji-man (South Korea) Lee Jae-jin	(Thailand) Adisak Wiriyapadungpong (Thailand) Songphon Anugritayawon	(Chinese Taipei) Wang Chia-min (Chinese Taipei) Wang Yi-chieh
Boys' doubles	(South Korea) Hwang Ji-man (South Korea) Lee Jae-jin	(Thailand) Adisak Wiriyapadungpong (Thailand) Songphon Anugritayawon	(Indonesia) Titon Gustaman (Indonesia) Devin Lahardi Fitriawan
Girls' doubles	(South Korea) Cho A-ra (South Korea) Hwang Yu-mi	(Indonesia) Endang Nursugianti (Indonesia) Lita Nurlita	(Chinese Taipei) Cheng Hsiao-yun (Chinese Taipei) Cheng Shao-chieh
Girls' doubles	(South Korea) Cho A-ra (South Korea) Hwang Yu-mi	(Indonesia) Endang Nursugianti (Indonesia) Lita Nurlita	(Thailand) Duanganong Aroonkesorn (Thailand) Kunchala Voravichitchaikul
Mixed doubles	(South Korea) Lee Jae-jin (South Korea) Hwang Yu-mi	(South Korea) Hwang Ji-man (South Korea) Bae Seung-hee	(Indonesia) Hendra Setiawan (Indonesia) Lina Marlina
Mixed doubles	(South Korea) Lee Jae-jin (South Korea) Hwang Yu-mi	(South Korea) Hwang Ji-man (South Korea) Bae Seung-hee	(Indonesia) Devin Lahardi Fitriawan (Indonesia) Endang Nursugianti

=== Finals ===
Category	Winners	Runners-up	Score
Boys' singles	(Indonesia) Ardiansyah	(Indonesia) Sony Dwi Kuncoro	15–12, 15–12
Girls' singles	(South Korea) Jun Jae-youn	(South Korea) Seo Yoon-hee	11–8, 8–11, 11–6
Boys' doubles	(South Korea) Hwang Ji-man (South Korea) Lee Jae-jin	(Thailand) Adisak Wiriyapadungpong (Thailand) Songphon Anugritayawon	17–15, 15–1
Girls' doubles	(South Korea) Cho A-ra (South Korea) Hwang Yu-mi	(Indonesia) Endang Nursugianti (Indonesia) Lita Nurlita	15–13, 15–11
Mixed doubles	(South Korea) Lee Jae-jin (South Korea) Hwang Yu-mi	(South Korea) Hwang Ji-man (South Korea) Bae Seung-hee	15–7, 15–12

== Medal table ==
Rank	Nation	Gold	Silver	Bronze	Total
1	South Korea (KOR)	5	2	3	10
2	Indonesia (INA)	1	2	7	10
3	Malaysia (MAS)	1	0	0	1
4	Chinese Taipei (TPE)	0	2	2	4
5	Thailand (THA)	0	1	2	3
Totals (5 entries)		7	7	14	28

== See also ==
- List of sporting events in Taiwan
