= Silvi Antarini =

Indonesian badminton player (born 1984)

Personal information
- Born: 26 January 1984 (age 42) Jakarta, Indonesia

Sport
- Country: Indonesia
- Sport: Badminton
- Event: Women's singles

Women's singles
- BWF profile
Medal record
Women's badminton
Representing Indonesia
Asian Championships
Silver medal – second place	2003 Jakarta	Women's singles
SEA Games
Bronze medal – third place	2003 Vietnam	Women's team
World Junior Championships
Bronze medal – third place	2000 Guangzhou	Mixed team
Asian Junior Championships
Bronze medal – third place	2001 Taipei	Girls' singles
Bronze medal – third place	2001 Taipei	Girls' team

Silvi Antarini (born 26 January 1984) is a former Indonesian badminton player from Jaya Raya Jakarta club. She was part of the Indonesia junior team that won the bronze medal at the 2001 Asian Junior Championships, and also clinched the bronze medal in the girls' singles event. In the senior event, she competed at the 2003 SEA Games, winning the bronze medal in the women's team event. Antarini was the silver medalist at the 2003 Asian Championships in the women's singles event.

== Achievements ==
=== Asian Championships ===
Women's singles
Year	Venue	Opponent	Score	Result	Ref.
2003	Tennis Indoor Gelora Bung Karno; Jakarta, Indonesia	(Hong Kong) Wang Chen	6–11, 5–11	Silver	

=== Asian Junior Championships ===
Girls' singles
Year	Venue	Opponent	Score	Result	Ref.
2001	Taipei Gymnasium, Taipei, Taiwan	(South Korea) Jun Jae-youn	6–11, 6–11	Bronze	

=== IBF International (1 title, 1 runner-up) ===
Women's singles
Year	Tournament	Opponent	Score	Result	Ref.
2004	Vietnam Satellite	(Thailand) Salakjit Ponsana	11–4, 7–11, 11–9	(gold) Winner	
2005	Surabaya Satellite	(Indonesia) Maria Kristin Yulianti	11–8, 6–11, 4–11	(silver) Runner-up	
