= Singapore International =

Badminton tournament in Singapore

The Singapore International or Singapore Satellite, Cheers Asian Satellite is an open international badminton tournament in Singapore. In the last few years, this tournament has been an International Series level. There is another tournament with higher level and prize money, which is the Singapore Open.

== List of winners ==
Year	Men's singles	Women's singles	Men's doubles	Women's doubles	Mixed doubles	Ref
1999	(Malaysia) Sairul Amar Ayob	(Indonesia) Yuli Marfuah	(Indonesia) Ade Lukas (Indonesia) Hermono Yuwono	(Malaysia) Ang Li Peng (Malaysia) Chor Hooi Yee	(Malaysia) Pang Cheh Chang (Malaysia) Lim Pek Siah	
2000	Not held					
2001	(Malaysia) Jason Wong	(China) Li Li	(Indonesia) Ade Lukas (Indonesia) Andreas Setiawan	(China) Ge Fei (China) Qian Hong	(China) Sun Jun (China) Ge Fei	
2002	(Singapore) Ronald Susilo	(China) Li Li	(Indonesia) Donny Prasetyo (Indonesia) Denny Setiawan	(Malaysia) Ang Li Peng (Malaysia) Lim Pek Siah	(Indonesia) Anggun Nugroho (Indonesia) Monica Permadi	
2003	(Singapore) Ronald Susilo	(Singapore) Li Li	(Singapore) Hendri Saputra (Singapore) Denny Setiawan	(Singapore) Jiang Yanmei (Singapore) Li Yujia	(Singapore) Hendri Saputra (Singapore) Li Yujia	
2004	(Singapore) Kendrick Lee Yen Hui	(Singapore) Li Li	(Malaysia) Lin Woon Fui (Malaysia) Mohd Fairuzizuan Mohd Tazari	(Indonesia) Endang Nursugianti (Indonesia) Rani Mundiasti	(Indonesia) Pribadi (Indonesia) Endang Nursugianti	
2005	(Indonesia) Jeffer Rosobin	(Singapore) Li Li	(Malaysia) Ng Kean Kok (Malaysia) Hong Chieng Hun	(Singapore) Jiang Yanmei (Singapore) Li Yujia	(Singapore) Hendri Saputra (Singapore) Li Yujia	
2006	(Indonesia) Jeffer Rosobin	(Indonesia) Maria Kristin Yulianti	(Indonesia) Yoga Ukikasah (Indonesia) Yonathan Suryatama Dasuki	(Indonesia) Nitya Krishinda Maheswari (Indonesia) Nadya Melati	(Indonesia) Lingga Lie (Indonesia) Devi Tika Permatasari	
2007	(Malaysia) Tan Chun Seang	(South Korea) Jun Jae-youn	(Malaysia) Khoo Chung Chiat (Malaysia) Chang Hun Pin	(South Korea) Ha Jung-eun (South Korea) Kim Min-jung	(South Korea) Cho Gun-woo (South Korea) Kim Min-jung	
2008	(South Korea) Ahn Hyun-suk	(Thailand) Porntip Buranaprasertsuk	(Indonesia) Fernando Kurniawan (Indonesia) Lingga Lie	(Singapore) Shinta Mulia Sari (Singapore) Yao Lei	(Singapore) Riky Widianto (Singapore) Yao Lei	
2009	(South Korea) Shon Seung-mo	(South Korea) Bae Yeon-ju	(South Korea) Heo Hoon-hoi (South Korea) Lee Jae-jin	(South Korea) Kim Jin-ock (South Korea) Jung Kyung-eun	(South Korea) Lee Jae-jin (South Korea) Kim Jin-ock	
2010	(South Korea) Hong Seung-ki	(Singapore) Chen Jiayuan	(Indonesia) Albert Saputra (Indonesia) Rizki Yanu Kresnayandi	(South Korea) Yim Jae-eun (South Korea) Lee Se-rang	(Hong Kong) Yohan Hadikusumo Wiratama (Hong Kong) Tse Ying Suet	
2011	(Japan) Kazuteru Kozai	(Singapore) Xing Aiying	(Indonesia) Agripina Prima Rahmanto Putra (Indonesia) Marcus Fernaldi Gideon	(Japan) Aya Shimozaki (Japan) Emi Moue	(Singapore) Danny Bawa Chrisnanta (Singapore) Vanessa Neo	
2012	(Thailand) Sitthikom Thammasin	(Singapore) Xing Aiying	(Chinese Taipei) Liang Jui-wei (Chinese Taipei) Liao Kuan-hao	(Japan) Asumi Kugo (Japan) Megumi Yokoyama	(Chinese Taipei) Tseng Min-hao (Chinese Taipei) Lai Chia-wen	
2013	(Singapore) Derek Wong	(Thailand) Rawinda Prajongjai	(Chinese Taipei) Chen Chung-Jen (Chinese Taipei) Wang Chi-lin	(Singapore) Shinta Mulia Sari (Singapore) Yao Lei	(Thailand) Vasin Nilyoke (Thailand) Chayanit Chaladchalam	
2014	(Singapore) Loh Kean Yew	(Thailand) Supanida Katethong	(Chinese Taipei) Huang Po-jui (Chinese Taipei) Lu Ching-yao	(Japan) Naoko Fukuman (Japan) Kurumi Yonao	(Singapore) Terry Hee (Singapore) Tan Wei Han	
2015	(Malaysia) Iskandar Zulkarnain Zainuddin	(Indonesia) Gregoria Mariska Tunjung	(Singapore) Terry Hee (Singapore) Loh Kean Hean	(Indonesia) Apriyani Rahayu (Indonesia) Jauza Fadhila Sugiarto	(Indonesia) Hafiz Faizal (Indonesia) Shella Devi Aulia	
2016	(Malaysia) Satheishtharan Ramachandran	(Indonesia) Asty Dwi Widyaningrum	(Malaysia) Goh Sze Fei (Malaysia) Nur Izzuddin	(Indonesia) Suci Rizky Andini (Indonesia) Yulfira Barkah	(Indonesia) Yantoni Edy Saputra (Indonesia) Marsheilla Gischa Islami	
2017	(Singapore) Loh Kean Yew	(Indonesia) Ruselli Hartawan	(Indonesia) Kenas Adi Haryanto (Indonesia) Muhammad Reza Pahlevi Isfahani	(Indonesia) Nisak Puji Lestari (Indonesia) Rahmadhani Hastiyanti Putri	(Indonesia) Andika Ramadiansyah (Indonesia) Mychelle Chrystine Bandaso	
2018	(Indonesia) Krishna Adi Nugraha	(Indonesia) Choirunnisa	(Hong Kong) Yonny Chung (Hong Kong) Tam Chun Hei	(Hong Kong) Ng Tsz Yau (Hong Kong) Yuen Sin Ying	(Hong Kong) Yeung Ming Nok (Hong Kong) Ng Tsz Yau	
2019– 2024	Not held					
2025 IC	(Indonesia) Zaki Ubaidillah	(Indonesia) Ruzana	(Indonesia) Raymond Indra (Indonesia) Nikolaus Joaquin	(South Korea) Jang Eun-seo (South Korea) Lee Seo-jin	(Indonesia) Bobby Setiabudi (Indonesia) Melati Daeva Oktavianti	
2026 IC (I)	(Chinese Taipei) Wu Zhe-ying	(Malaysia) Goh Jin Wei	(Indonesia) Taufik Aderya (Indonesia) Daniel Edgar Marvino	(South Korea) Jung Kyung-eun (South Korea) Kim So-yeong	(Japan) Yuta Watanabe (Japan) Maya Taguchi	
2026 IS	(Thailand) Wongsup Wongsup-In	(Thailand) Yataweemin Ketklieng	(Indonesia) Erwin Rendana Purnomo (Indonesia) Ade Yusuf Santoso	(Chinese Taipei) Hsieh Mi-yen (Chinese Taipei) Yu Chien-hui	(Indonesia) Muhammad Al Farizi (Indonesia) Jessica Maya Rismawardani	
2026 IC (II)	(Japan) Riku Hatano	(Japan) Manami Suizu	(Japan) Takuto Goto (Japan) Tsubasa Yoshida	(Japan) Himeka Hashimura (Japan) Mao Yamakita	(Japan) Mutsuki Ampo (Japan) Hina Osawa	

== Performance by nation ==
As of the 2026 IC (II) edition

Rank	Nation	MS	WS	MD	WD	XD	Total
1	Indonesia	4	7	11	5	8	35
2	Singapore*	6	6	2	4	5	23
3	Malaysia	5	1	4	2	1	13
3	South Korea	3	2	1	5	2	13
5	Japan	2	1	1	4	2	10
6	Thailand	2	4			1	7
7	Chinese Taipei	1		3	1	1	6
8	China		2		1	1	4
8	Hong Kong			1	1	2	4
Total		23	23	23	23	23	115

* Host nation

== See also ==
- Singapore Open
