= Ahn Hyun-suk =

South Korean badminton player

Personal information
- Born: 26 October 1984 (age 42)

Sport
- Country: South Korea
- Sport: Badminton
- Event: Men's singles

Men's singles
- BWF profile
Medal record
Men's badminton
Representing South Korea
World Junior Championships
Silver medal – second place	2000 Guangzhou	Mixed team
Asian Junior Championships
Bronze medal – third place	2001 Taipei	Boys' singles
Bronze medal – third place	2001 Taipei	Boys' team

Ahn Hyun-suk (Korean: 안현석; born 26 October 1984) is a former South Korean badminton player. He was the bronze medallists at the 2001 Asian Junior Championships in the boys' singles and team events. He educated at the Korea National Sport University. In the senior event, Ahn who was part of the Gimcheon City team, became the finalist at the 2003 U.S. Open, won the title at the 2004 Vietnam and 2008 Singapore Satellite tournaments. Ahn started his career as a coach in Yonex South Korean team in 2016.

== Achievements ==
=== Asian Junior Championships ===
Boys' singles
Year	Venue	Opponent	Score	Result
2001	Taipei Gymnasium; Taipei, Taiwan	(Indonesia) Ardiansyah	4–15, 8–15	Bronze

=== IBF World Grand Prix ===
The World Badminton Grand Prix sanctioned by International Badminton Federation (IBF) since 1983.

Men's singles
Year	Tournament	Opponent	Score	Result
2003	U.S. Open	(Chinese Taipei) Chien Yu-hsiu	15–5, 6–15, 12-15	(silver) Runner-up

=== BWF International Challenge/Series ===
Men's singles
Year	Tournament	Opponent	Score	Result
2008	Singapore Satellite	(Thailand) Pakkawat Vilailak	21–19, 21–15	(gold) Winner
2004	Vietnam Satellite	(Vietnam) Nguyễn Tiến Minh	13–15, 15–9, 15–10	(gold) Winner

BWF International Challenge tournament
BWF International Series tournament
