= 2010 Badminton Asia Championships =

Badminton championships

Tournament information
- Location: New Delhi, India
- Dates: 12 April–18 April

The 2010 Badminton Asia Championships is the 29th tournament of the Badminton Asia Championships. It was held in New Delhi, India from 12 April – 18 April 2010.

== Venue ==
- Siri Fort Indoor Stadium

== Medalists ==
Event	Gold	Silver	Bronze
Men's singles	(China) Lin Dan	(China) Wang Zhengming	(Thailand) Boonsak Ponsana
Men's singles	(China) Lin Dan	(China) Wang Zhengming	(Japan) Kenichi Tago
Women's singles	(China) Li Xuerui	(China) Liu Xin	(India) Saina Nehwal
Women's singles	(China) Li Xuerui	(China) Liu Xin	(Hong Kong) Zhou Mi
Men's doubles	(South Korea) Cho Gun-woo and Yoo Yeon-seong	(Chinese Taipei) Chen Hung-ling and Lin Yu-lang	(Chinese Taipei) Fang Chieh-min and Lee Sheng-mu
Men's doubles	(South Korea) Cho Gun-woo and Yoo Yeon-seong	(Chinese Taipei) Chen Hung-ling and Lin Yu-lang	(South Korea) Han Sang-hoon and Hwang Ji-man
Women's doubles	(China) Pan Pan and Tian Qing	(Malaysia) Vivian Hoo Kah Mun and Woon Khe Wei	(Chinese Taipei) Chien Yu-Chin and Cheng Wen-Hsing
Women's doubles	(China) Pan Pan and Tian Qing	(Malaysia) Vivian Hoo Kah Mun and Woon Khe Wei	(Thailand) Savitree Amitrapai and Vacharaporn Munkit
Mixed doubles	(Malaysia) Chan Peng Soon and Goh Liu Ying	(South Korea) Yoo Yeon-seong and Kim Min-jung	(Indonesia) Devin Lahardi Fitriawan and Lilyana Natsir
Mixed doubles	(Malaysia) Chan Peng Soon and Goh Liu Ying	(South Korea) Yoo Yeon-seong and Kim Min-jung	(China) Qiu Zihan and Tian Qing

== Medal count ==
Pos	Country	Gold	Silver	Bronze	Total
1	China	3	2	1	6
2	South Korea	1	1	1	3
3	Malaysia	1	1	0	2
4	Chinese Taipei	0	1	2	3
5	Thailand	0	0	2	2
6	India	0	0	1	1
6	Hong Kong	0	0	1	1
6	Indonesia	0	0	1	1

== Results ==
=== Men's singles ===
Quarterfinals
(Chinese Taipei) Hsueh Hsuan Yi	13	16
6	(Japan) Kenichi Tago	21	21
(China) Wang Zhengming	21	21
(Japan) Shoji Sato	16	15
5	(Thailand) Boonsak Ponsana	21	17	21
10	(Malaysia) Muhammad Hafiz Hashim	9	21	10
(Hong Kong) Hu Yun	11	10
2	(China) Lin Dan	21	21

Semifinals
(Japan) Kenichi Tago	14	21	16
(China) Wang Zhengming	21	19	21
(Thailand) Boonsak Ponsana	20	10
(China) Lin Dan	22	21

Finals
(China) Wang Zhengming	17	15
(China) Lin Dan	21	21

=== Women's singles ===
Quarterfinals
1	(India) Saina Nehwal	21	21
7	(Malaysia) Wong Mew Choo	5	13
Q	(China) Li Xuerui	21	21
Q	(Japan) Ayane Kurihara	17	18
Q	(China) Liu Xin	21	21
(India) Aditi Mutatkar	14	11
5	(Thailand) Salakjit Ponsana	21	17
2	(Hong Kong) Zhou Mi	23	21

Semifinals
(India) Saina Nehwal	17	11
(China) Li Xuerui	21	21
(China) Liu Xin	21	21
(Hong Kong) Zhou Mi	15	18

Finals
(China) Li Xuerui	21	18	21
(China) Liu Xin	13	21	19

=== Men's doubles ===
Quarterfinals
1	(Chinese Taipei) Chen Hung Ling (Chinese Taipei) Lin Yu Lang	19	21	21
(Malaysia) Mak Hee Chun (Malaysia) Tan Wee Kiong	21	15	18
3	(India) Rupesh Kumar (India) Sanave Thomas	21	16	15
(South Korea) Han Sang-hoon (South Korea) Hwang Ji-man	17	21	21
6	(Chinese Taipei) Fang Chieh Min (Chinese Taipei) Lee Sheng Mu	17	21	21
4	(Singapore) Hendri Kurniawan Saputra (Singapore) Hendra Wijaya	21	12	13
5	(South Korea) Cho Gun-woo (South Korea) Yoo Yeon-seong	21	21
(Malaysia) Ong Soon Hock (Malaysia) Hoon Thien How	18	17

Semifinals
(Chinese Taipei) Chen Hung Ling (Chinese Taipei) Lin Yu Lang	21	12	21
(South Korea) Han Sang-hoon (South Korea) Hwang Ji-man	18	21	18
(Chinese Taipei) Fang Chieh Min (Chinese Taipei) Lee Sheng Mu	18	20
(South Korea) Cho Gun-woo (South Korea) Yoo Yeon-seong	21	22

Finals
(Chinese Taipei) Chen Hung Ling (Chinese Taipei) Lin Yu Lang	19	21	17
(South Korea) Cho Gun-woo (South Korea) Yoo Yeon-seong	21	12	21

=== Women's doubles ===
Quarterfinals
(Malaysia) Vivian Kah Mun Hoo (Malaysia) Woon Khe Wei	26	11	21
(Indonesia) Meiliana Jauhari (Indonesia) Greysia Polii	24	21	19
4	(Thailand) Savitree Amitapai (Thailand) Vachaporn Munkit	22	16	21
(Chinese Taipei) Hsieh Pei Chen (Chinese Taipei) Wang Pei Rong	20	21	18
(Indonesia) Annisa Wahyuni (Indonesia) Anneke Feinya Agustin	18	12
3	(Chinese Taipei) Chien Yu-Chin (Chinese Taipei) Cheng Wen-Hsing	21	21
6	(China) Pan Pan (China) Tian Qing	21	21
2	(Japan) Miyuki Maeda (Japan) Satoko Suetsuna	13	10

Semifinals
(Malaysia) Vivian Kah Mun Hoo (Malaysia) Woon Khe Wei	18	21	21
(Thailand) Savitree Amitapai (Thailand) Vachaporn Munkit	21	17	14
(Chinese Taipei) Chien Yu-Chin (Chinese Taipei) Cheng Wen-Hsing	24	16	18
(China) Pan Pan (China) Tian Qing	22	21	21

Finals
(Malaysia) Vivian Kah Mun Hoo (Malaysia) Woon Khe Wei	10	6
(China) Pan Pan (China) Tian Qing	21	21

=== Mixed doubles ===
Quarterfinals
1	(India) Diju V (India) Jwala Gutta	21	11	14
(China) Qiu Zihan (China) Tian Qing	15	21	21
(Indonesia) Tontowi Ahmad (Indonesia) Greysia Polii	21	12	17
6	(South Korea) Yoo Yeon-seong (South Korea) Kim Min-jung	17	21	21
7	(Malaysia) Chan Peng Soon (Malaysia) Goh Liu Ying	18	21	21
(Japan) Hirokatsu Hashimoto (Japan) Mizuki Fujii	21	16	9
5	(Indonesia) Devin Lahardi Fitriawan (Indonesia) Lilyana Natsir	22	21
(Hong Kong) Yohan Hadikusumo Wiratama (Hong Kong) Tse Ying Suet	20	16

Semifinals
(China) Qiu Zihan (China) Tian Qing	22	21	11
(South Korea) Yoo Yeon-seong (South Korea) Kim Min-jung	24	13	21
(Malaysia) Chan Peng Soon (Malaysia) Goh Liu Ying	12	21	21
(Indonesia) Devin Lahardi Fitriawan (Indonesia) Lilyana Natsir	21	19	15

Finals
(South Korea) Yoo Yeon-seong (South Korea) Kim Min-jung	17	22	19
(Malaysia) Chan Peng Soon (Malaysia) Goh Liu Ying	21	20	21
