= Endang Nursugianti =

Indonesian badminton player (born 1983)

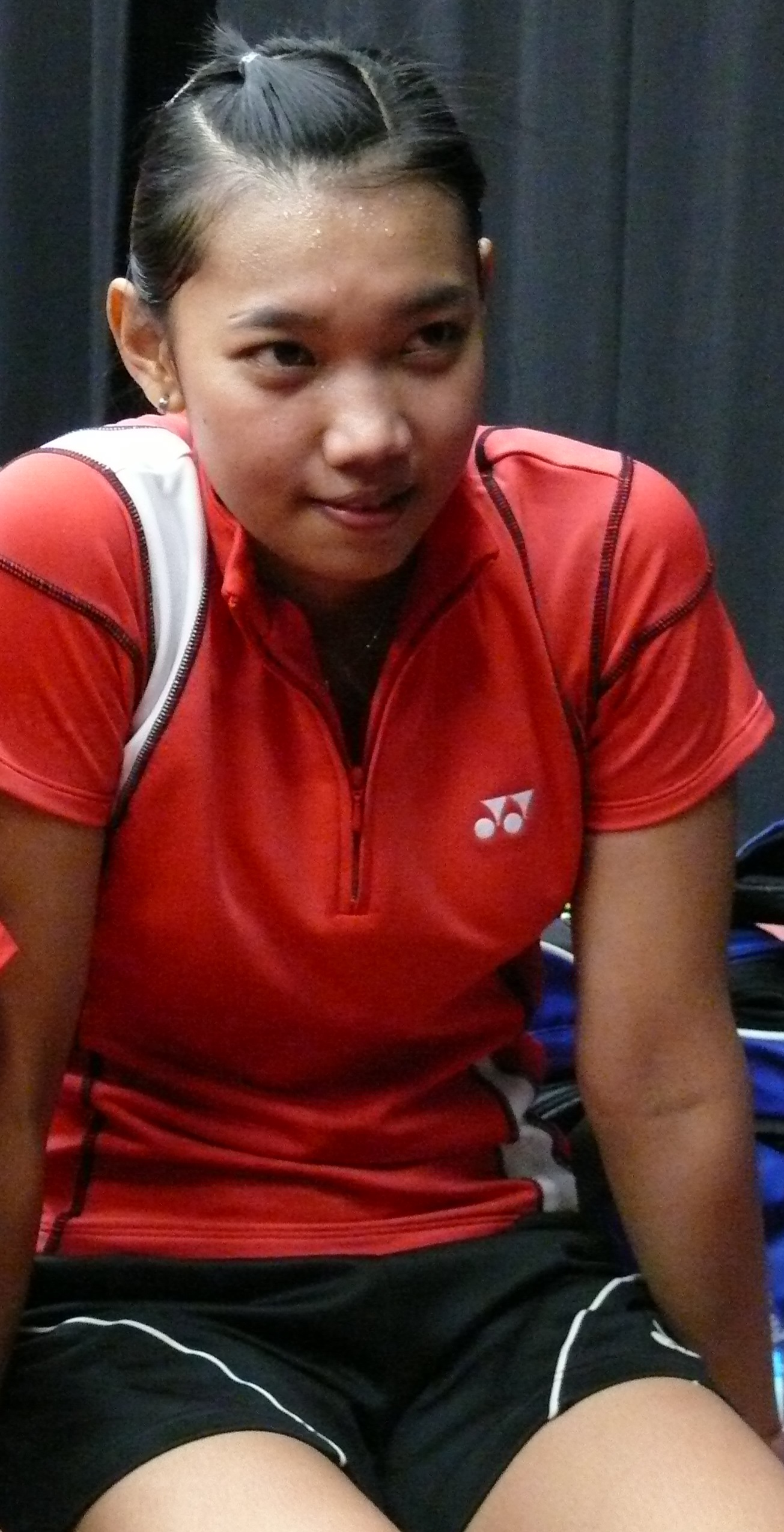

Personal information
- Born: 29 November 1983 (age 42) Jakarta, Indonesia
- Height: 1.63 m (5 ft 4 in)
- Weight: 56 kg (123 lb)

Sport
- Country: Indonesia
- Sport: Badminton
- Handedness: Right
- Event: Women's & mixed doubles

Women's & mixed doubles
- BWF profile
Medal record
Women's badminton
Representing Indonesia
Sudirman Cup
Silver medal – second place	2007 Glasgow	Mixed team
Uber Cup
Silver medal – second place	2008 Jakarta	Women's team
Asian Championships
Bronze medal – third place	2005 Hyderabad	Mixed doubles
SEA Games
Gold medal – first place	2007 Nakhon Ratchasima	Women's team
World Junior Championships
Bronze medal – third place	2000 Guangzhou	Mixed team
Asian Junior Championships
Silver medal – second place	2001 Taipei	Girls' doubles
Bronze medal – third place	2001 Taipei	Mixed doubles
Bronze medal – third place	2001 Taipei	Girls' team

Endang Nursugianti (born 29 November 1983) is an Indonesian badminton player and coach.

== Career ==
Nursigianti started her badminton career when she was young. In 2001, she competed at the Asian Junior Championships, winning a silver in the girls' doubles and two bronzes in the mixed doubles and girls' team event.

In 2005, she won the bronze medal at the Asian Championships in the mixed doubles event partnered with Muhammad Rijal. Nursugianti won the women's doubles at the 2006 Dutch Open with Rani Mundiasti. She was a member of the Indonesian team that won a women's team gold at the 2007 Southeast Asian Games, and silver medals at the 2007 Sudirman Cup and 2008 Uber Cup.

== Personal life ==
When she was young, she joined the Jaya Raya Jakarta badminton club. Her parents' names are Tasurun (father) and Sugiarti (mother). Her hobbies are swimming and reading books. Generally people called her Endang. After coaching stints at PB Djarum Badminton club Endang currently is coach of the Papuan & Bali Badminton team. She also performed badminton clinics for the Indonesian Badminton Association (PBSI) as a Women's Doubles Coach.

== Achievements ==
=== Asian Championships ===
Mixed doubles
Year	Venue	Partner	Opponent	Score	Result
2005	Gachibowli Indoor Stadium; Hyderabad, India	(Indonesia) Muhammad Rijal	(South Korea) Lee Jae-jin (South Korea) Lee Hyo-jung	4–15, 8–15	Bronze

=== Asian Junior Championships ===
Girls' doubles
Year	Venue	Partner	Opponent	Score	Result
2001	Taipei Gymnasium; Taipei, Taiwan	(Indonesia) Lita Nurlita	(South Korea) Cho A-ra (South Korea) Hwang Yu-mi	13–15, 11–15	Silver

Mixed doubles
Year	Venue	Partner	Opponent	Score	Result
2001	Taipei Gymnasium; Taipei, Taiwan	(Indonesia) Devin Lahardi Fitriawan	(South Korea)		Bronze

=== IBF World Grand Prix ===
The World Badminton Grand Prix was sanctioned by the International Badminton Federation from 1983 to 2006.

Women's doubles
Year	Tournament	Partner	Opponent	Score	Result
2006	Philippines Open	(Indonesia) Rani Mundiasti	(Indonesia) Jo Novita (Indonesia) Greysia Polii	16–21, 13–21	(silver) Runner-up
2006	Bitburger Open	(Indonesia) Rani Mundiasti	(Singapore) Jiang Yanmei (Singapore) Li Yujia	11–21, 19–21	(silver) Runner-up
2006	Dutch Open	(Indonesia) Rani Mundiasti	(Germany) Michaela Peiffer (Germany) Kathrin Piotrowski	21–16, 21–16	(gold) Winner

Mixed doubles
Year	Tournament	Partner	Opponent	Score	Result
2004	Chinese Taipei Open	(Indonesia) Muhammad Rijal	(Malaysia) Koo Kien Keat (Malaysia) Wong Pei Tty	3–15, 5–15	(silver) Runner-up

=== BWF International Challenge/Series/Asian Satellite ===
Women's doubles
Year	Tournament	Partner	Opponent	Score	Result
2004	Vietnam Satellite	(Indonesia) Rani Mundiasti	(Thailand) Duanganong Aroonkesorn (Thailand) Kunchala Voravichitchaikul	17–16, 12–15, 5–15	(silver) Runner-up
2004	Cheers Asian Satellite	(Indonesia) Rani Mundiasti	(Thailand) Duanganong Aroonkesorn (Thailand) Kunchala Voravichitchaikul	8–15, 15–12, 15–10	(gold) Winner

Mixed doubles
Year	Tournament	Partner	Opponent	Score	Result
2004	Cheers Asian Satellite	(Indonesia) Pribadi	(Malaysia) Mohd Fairuzizuan Mohd Tazari (Malaysia) Ooi Sock Ai	15–13, 15–13	(gold) Winner
