= Hong Seung-ki =

South Korean badminton player (born 1984)

Personal information
- Born: 4 October 1984 (age 41)

Sport
- Country: South Korea
- Sport: Badminton
- Event: Men's singles & doubles

Men's singles & doubles
- BWF profile
Medal record
Men's badminton
Representing South Korea
World Junior Championships
Silver medal – second place	2000 Guangzhou	Mixed team
Asian Junior Championships
Silver medal – second place	2002 Kuala Lumpur	Boys' team

Hong Seung-ki (Korean: 홍승기; born 4 October 1984) is a South Korean badminton player. Hong educated at the Seoul Physical Education High School, and has won five national junior title since in the first grade. He was part of the national junior team that won the silver medal at the 2000 World Junior and 2002 Asian Junior Championships. Hong clinched the boys' singles title at the 2002 Dutch Junior, and was ranked 1 in the national junior at that year. He entered the Inha University, and after graduated he join the Miryang city team. Hong won his first international title at the 2003 Canada International tournament in the men's singles event. In 2009, he finished as the semi-finalists at the 2009 Singapore International Series in the men's singles and doubles event, he then took the men's singles title in Singapore in 2010.

== Achievements ==
=== BWF International Challenge/Series ===
Men's singles

Year	Tournament	Opponent	Score	Result
2010	Singapore International	(South Korea) Shon Seung-mo	21–17, 21–12	(gold) Winner
2003	Canada International	(England) Andrew South	9–15, 15–13, 15–5	(gold) Winner

BWF International Challenge tournament
BWF International Series tournament
