= Lee Sheng-mu =

Taiwanese badminton player (born 1986)

Lee Sheng-mu 李勝木
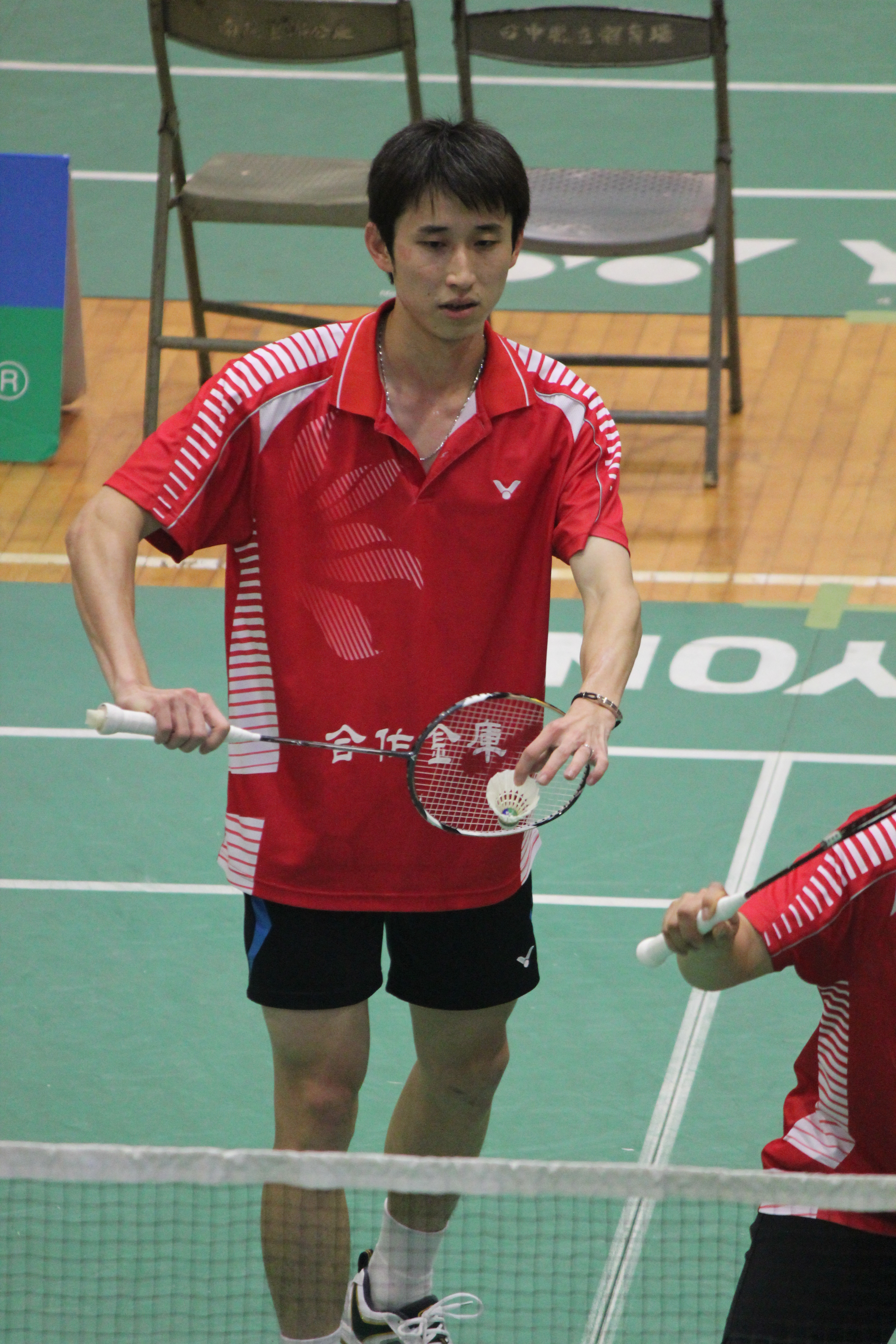

Personal information
- Born: 3 October 1986 (age 40) Taipei, Taiwan
- Height: 1.79 m (5 ft 10 in)
- Weight: 71 kg (157 lb)

Sport
- Country: Republic of China (Taiwan)
- Sport: Badminton
- Handedness: Right

Men's & mixed doubles
- Highest ranking: 3 (MD 2 April 2015); 6 (XD 6 January 2011)
- BWF profile
Medal record
Men's badminton
Representing Chinese Taipei
World Championships
Bronze medal – third place	2010 Paris	Mixed doubles
Asian Games
Bronze medal – third place	2014 Incheon	Men's team
Asian Championships
Bronze medal – third place	2010 New Delhi	Men's doubles
East Asian Games
Gold medal – first place	2013 Tianjin	Men's doubles
Bronze medal – third place	2013 Tianjin	Mixed doubles
Bronze medal – third place	2013 Tianjin	Men's team
Summer Universiade
Silver medal – second place	2011 Shenzhen	Men's doubles
Silver medal – second place	2011 Shenzhen	Mixed doubles
Bronze medal – third place	2007 Bangkok	Mixed team
Bronze medal – third place	2011 Shenzhen	Mixed team
World Junior Championships
Bronze medal – third place	2004 Richmond	Mixed doubles

Lee Sheng-mu (traditional Chinese: 李勝木; simplified Chinese: 李胜木; pinyin: Lǐ Shèngmù; born 3 October 1986) is a Taiwanese badminton player from the Taiwan Cooperative Bank club. He competed at the 2010 and 2014 Asian Games, and the 2012 and 2016 Summer Olympics.

== Career ==
Lee Sheng-mu's elite career began in the 2009 badminton season when he reached the semifinals of the 2009 Korea Open Super Series in the men's doubles with Fang Chieh-min. The pair continued their success in 2010 with victories at the 2010 Singapore Super Series and the 2010 Indonesia Super Series. He and Fang reached the quarterfinals of the 2012 London Olympics losing to Mathias Boe and Carsten Mogensen of Denmark. After the 2012 Olympics, Lee stopped playing with Fang Chieh-min, partnering with Tsai Chia-hsin instead. Together they reached a top ranking of 3rd, after reaching the finals of the 2014 Australian Open and 2014 Singapore Open. They were consistent semi-finalists and quarter-finalists at various Super Series Events. Together they represented Chinese Taipei in the 2016 Rio Olympics, where they failed to progress out of the group stage. Lee is also partnered with Chien Yu-chin in mixed doubles. Their top result came in 2010 when they reached the semifinals of the 2010 Paris World Championships and won the bronze medal.

== Achievements ==
=== BWF World Championships ===
Mixed doubles
Year	Venue	Partner	Opponent	Score	Result
2010	Stade Pierre de Coubertin, Paris, France	(Chinese Taipei) Chien Yu-chin	(China) He Hanbin (China) Yu Yang	13–21, 8–21	Bronze

=== Asian Championships ===
Men's doubles
Year	Venue	Partner	Opponent	Score	Result
2010	Siri Fort Indoor Stadium; New Delhi, India	(Chinese Taipei) Fang Chieh-min	(South Korea) Cho Gun-woo (South Korea) Yoo Yeon-seong	18–21, 20–22	Bronze

=== East Asian Games ===
Men's doubles
Year	Venue	Partner	Opponent	Score	Result
2013	Binhai New Area Dagang Gymnasium; Tianjin, China	(Chinese Taipei) Tsai Chia-hsin	(Chinese Taipei) Chen Hung-ling (Chinese Taipei) Lu Chia-pin	21–8, 21–18	Gold

Mixed doubles
Year	Venue	Partner	Opponent	Score	Result
2013	Binhai New Area Dagang Gymnasium; Tianjin, China	(Chinese Taipei) Wang Pei-rong	(Hong Kong) Lee Chun Hei (Hong Kong) Chau Hoi Wah	12–21, 15–21	Bronze

=== Summer Universiade ===
Men's doubles
Year	Venue	Partner	Opponent	Score	Result
2011	Gymnasium of SZIIT; Shenzhen, China	(Chinese Taipei) Fang Chieh-min	(Thailand) Bodin Isara (Thailand) Maneepong Jongjit	10–21, 16–21	Silver

Mixed doubles
Year	Venue	Partner	Opponent	Score	Result
2011	Gymnasium of SZIIT; Shenzhen, China	(Chinese Taipei) Hsieh Pei-chen	(South Korea) Shin Baek-cheol (South Korea) Eom Hye-won	21–15, 11–21, 19–21	Silver

=== World Junior Championships ===
Mixed doubles
Year	Venue	Partner	Opponent	Score	Result
2004	Minoru Arena; Richmond, Canada	(Chinese Taipei) Cheng Shao-chieh	(China) He Hanbin (China) Yu Yang	3–15, 1–15	Bronze

=== BWF World Tour ===
The BWF World Tour, which was announced on 19 March 2017 and implemented in 2018, is a series of elite badminton tournaments sanctioned by the Badminton World Federation (BWF). The BWF World Tour is divided into levels of World Tour Finals, Super 1000, Super 750, Super 500, Super 300 (part of the HSBC World Tour), and the BWF Tour Super 100.

Men's doubles
Year	Tournament	Level	Partner	Opponent	Score	Result
2018	Vietnam Open	Super 100	(Chinese Taipei) Yang Po-hsuan	(South Korea) Ko Sung-hyun (South Korea) Shin Baek-cheol	20–22, 18–21	(silver) Runner-up

=== BWF Superseries ===
The BWF Superseries, which was launched on 14 December 2006 and implemented in 2007, was a series of elite badminton tournaments, sanctioned by the Badminton World Federation (BWF). BWF Superseries levels were Superseries and Superseries Premier. A season of Superseries consisted of twelve tournaments around the world that had been introduced since 2011. Successful players were invited to the Superseries Finals, which were held at the end of each year.

Men's doubles
Year	Tournament	Partner	Opponent	Score	Result
2010	Singapore Open	(Chinese Taipei) Fang Chieh-min	(United States) Howard Bach (United States) Tony Gunawan	21–14, 21–15	(gold) Winner
2010	Indonesia Open	(Chinese Taipei) Fang Chieh-min	(South Korea) Cho Gun-woo (South Korea) Kwon Yi-goo	21–16, 21–15	(gold) Winner
2012	Malaysia Open	(Chinese Taipei) Fang Chieh-min	(South Korea) Cho Gun-woo (South Korea) Shin Baek-cheol	16–21, 21–16, 21–16	(gold) Winner
2014	Singapore Open	(Chinese Taipei) Tsai Chia-hsin	(China) Cai Yun (China) Lu Kai	19–21, 14–21	(silver) Runner-up
2014	Australian Open	(Chinese Taipei) Tsai Chia-hsin	(South Korea) Lee Yong-dae (South Korea) Yoo Yeon-seong	14–21, 18–21	(silver) Runner-up

BWF Super Series Finals tournament
BWF Super Series Premier tournament
BWF Super Series tournament

=== BWF Grand Prix ===
The BWF Grand Prix had two levels, the Grand Prix and Grand Prix Gold. It was a series of badminton tournaments sanctioned by the Badminton World Federation (BWF) and played between 2007 and 2017.

Men's doubles
Year	Tournament	Partner	Opponent	Score	Result
2008	Macau Open	(Chinese Taipei) Fang Chieh-min	(Malaysia) Koo Kien Keat (Malaysia) Tan Boon Heong	16–21, 18–21	(silver) Runner-up
2010	Canada Open	(Chinese Taipei) Fang Chieh-min	(Singapore) Hendri Saputra (Singapore) Chayut Triyachart	21–16, 21–16	(gold) Winner
2010	U.S. Open	(Chinese Taipei) Fang Chieh-min	(Chinese Taipei) Chen Hung-ling (Chinese Taipei) Lin Yu-lang	21–19, 21–14	(gold) Winner
2012	Swiss Open	(Chinese Taipei) Fang Chieh-min	(Japan) Naoki Kawamae (Japan) Shoji Sato	13–21, 14–21	(silver) Runner-up
2012	Australian Open	(Chinese Taipei) Fang Chieh-min	(Indonesia) Markis Kido (Indonesia) Hendra Setiawan	16–21, 15–21	(silver) Runner-up
2012	Macau Open	(Chinese Taipei) Tsai Chia-hsin	(Russia) Vladimir Ivanov (Russia) Ivan Sozonov	14–21, 21–17, 21–16	(gold) Winner
2013	Chinese Taipei Open	(Chinese Taipei) Tsai Chia-hsin	(South Korea) Kim Gi-jung (South Korea) Kim Sa-rang	11–21, 11–21	(silver) Runner-up
2013	Macau Open	(Chinese Taipei) Tsai Chia-hsin	(Malaysia) Hoon Thien How (Malaysia) Tan Wee Kiong	16–21, 19–21	(silver) Runner-up
2016	Swiss Open	(Chinese Taipei) Tsai Chia-hsin	(Denmark) Kim Astrup (Denmark) Anders Skaarup Rasmussen	8–21, 15–21	(silver) Runner-up

Mixed doubles
Year	Tournament	Partner	Opponent	Score	Result
2010	Canada Open	(Chinese Taipei) Chien Yu-chin	(Chinese Taipei) Chen Hung-ling (Chinese Taipei) Cheng Wen-hsing	21–16, 11–21, 21–15	(gold) Winner
2010	U.S. Open	(Chinese Taipei) Chien Yu-chin	(Germany) Michael Fuchs (Germany) Birgit Overzier	19–21, 14–21	(silver) Runner-up
2011	Thailand Open	(Chinese Taipei) Chien Yu-chin	(Indonesia) Nova Widianto (Indonesia) Vita Marissa	21–10, 23–21	(gold) Winner

BWF Grand Prix Gold tournament
BWF Grand Prix tournament

== Record against selected opponents ==
Men's doubles results with Fang Chieh-min against Super Series finalists, Worlds Semi-finalists, and Olympic quarterfinalists.

- (Australia) Ross Smith & Glenn Warfe 3–1
- (China) Cai Yun & Fu Haifeng 0–6
- (China) Guo Zhendong & Xu Chen 0–2
- (China) Chai Biao & Guo Zhendong 0–2
- (Denmark) Mathias Boe & Carsten Mogensen 3–4
- (Denmark) Lars Påske & Jonas Rasmussen 0–1
- (England) Anthony Clark & Nathan Robertson 1–1
- (Indonesia) Alvent Yulianto Chandra & Hendra Aprida Gunawan 1–1
- (Indonesia) Markis Kido & Hendra Setiawan 4–7
- (Indonesia) Mohammad Ahsan & Bona Septano 2–3
- (Japan) Keita Masuda & Tadashi Ohtsuka 0–3
- (Japan) Hirokatsu Hashimoto & Noriyasu Hirata 6–2
- (South Korea) Cho Gun-woo & Kwon Yi-goo 1–2
- (South Korea) Ko Sung-hyun & Yoo Yeon-seong 1–3
- (South Korea) Lee Jae-jin & Hwang Ji-man 1–0
- (South Korea) Jung Jae-sung & Lee Yong-dae 0–3
- (South Korea) Cho Gun-woo & Shin Baek-cheol 2–0
- (Malaysia) Gan Teik Chai & Tan Bin Shen 2–1
- (Malaysia) Mohd Zakry Abdul Latif & Mohd Fairuzizuan Mohd Tazari 1–0
- (Malaysia) Choong Tan Fook & Lee Wan Wah 2–2
- (Malaysia) Koo Kien Keat & Tan Boon Heong 1–1
- (Poland) Michal Logosz & Robert Mateusiak 0–1
- (Thailand) Songphon Anugritayawon & Sudket Prapakamol 1–0
- (Thailand) Bodin Isara & Maneepong Jongjit 2–0
- (United States) Howard Bach & Tony Gunawan 2–2
