= Vietnam International Challenge =

Badminton championships in Vietnam

The Vietnam International Challenge, formerly Vietnam Satellite and Hanoi International, is an international badminton tournament held in Vietnam. This tournament has been an International Challenge level since 2008. Another tournament named the Vietnam International Series was established in 2014, and the Vietnam Open was established in 1996.

== Previous winners ==
Year	Men's singles	Women's singles	Men's doubles	Women's doubles	Mixed doubles
2000	(Hong Kong) Tam Lok Tin	(Chinese Taipei) Chien Yu-chin	(Hong Kong) Liu Kwok Wa (Hong Kong) Wong Tsz Yin	(Chinese Taipei) Chen Yueh-ying (Chinese Taipei) Tsai Chia-chun	(Chinese Taipei) Chen Yuan-ting (Chinese Taipei) Tsai Chia-chun
2001	No competition				
2002	(Thailand) Jakrapan Thanathiratham	(China) Wu Huimin	(Indonesia) Hendri Saputra (Indonesia) Denny Setiawan	(China) Wu Huimin (China) Wu Ying	(Thailand) Sudket Prapakamol (Thailand) Salakjit Ponsana
2003	No competition				
2004	(South Korea) Ahn Hyun-suk	(Indonesia) Silvi Antarini	(Indonesia) Rian Sukmawan (Indonesia) Yoga Ukikasah	(Thailand) Duanganong Aroonkesorn (Thailand) Kunchala Voravichitchaikul	(Thailand) Nuttaphon Narkthong (Thailand) Kunchala Voravichitchaikul
2005	(Indonesia) Simon Santoso	(Thailand) Sujitra Ekmongkolpaisarn	(Malaysia) Gan Teik Chai (Malaysia) Mohd Zakry Abdul Latif	(South Korea) Ha Jung-eun (South Korea) Oh Seul-ki	(South Korea) Hwang Ji-man (South Korea) Oh Seul-ki
2006	(Vietnam) Nguyễn Tiến Minh	(South Korea) Jang Soo-young	(Thailand) Sudket Prapakamol (Thailand) Patapol Ngernsrisuk	(South Korea) Kim Min-jung (South Korea) Oh Seul-ki	(Thailand) Songphon Anugritayawon (Thailand) Kunchala Voravichitchaikul
2007	(Malaysia) Tan Chun Seang	(England) Tracey Hallam	(Indonesia) Mohammad Ahsan (Indonesia) Bona Septano	(Indonesia) Yulianti (Indonesia) Richi Puspita Dili	(Indonesia) Tri Kusharjanto (Indonesia) Yunita Tetty
2008	(Vietnam) Nguyễn Tiến Minh	(Malaysia) Lyddia Cheah	(Malaysia) Hong Chieng Hun (Malaysia) Ng Kean Kok	(Singapore) Frances Liu (Singapore) Vanessa Neo	(Malaysia) Lim Khim Wah (Malaysia) Ng Hui Lin
2009	(Vietnam) Nguyễn Tiến Minh	(Thailand) Ratchanok Intanon	(Japan) Takeshi Kamura (Japan) Takuma Ueda	(Indonesia) Pia Zebadiah Bernadet (Indonesia) Debby Susanto	(Indonesia) Tontowi Ahmad (Indonesia) Richi Puspita Dili
2010	(Chinese Taipei) Hsueh Hsuan-yi	(South Korea) Lee Hyun-jin	(Malaysia) Goh Wei Shem (Malaysia) Teo Kok Siang	(South Korea) Jung Kyung-eun (South Korea) Yoo Hyun-young	(Singapore) Hendri Saputra (Singapore) Vanessa Neo
2011	(South Korea) Lee Dong-keun	(Malaysia) Tee Jing Yi	(Indonesia) Fernando Kurniawan (Indonesia) Wifqi Windarto	(South Korea) Choi Hye-in (South Korea) Lee Se-rang	(Thailand) Patipat Chalardchaleam (Thailand) Savitree Amitrapai
2012	(Singapore) Derek Wong	(Thailand) Nitchaon Jindapol	(Indonesia) Ricky Karanda Suwardi (Indonesia) Muhammad Ulinnuha	(Indonesia) Pia Zebadiah Bernadet (Indonesia) Rizki Amelia Pradipta	(Indonesia) Hafiz Faizal (Indonesia) Pia Zebadiah Bernadet
2013	(Malaysia) Chan Kwong Beng	(Indonesia) Hanna Ramadini	(Chinese Taipei) Liao Min-chun (Chinese Taipei) Yang Po-han	(Thailand) Narissapat Lam (Thailand) Puttita Supajirakul	(Hong Kong) Chan Yun Lung (Hong Kong) Tse Ying Suet
2014	(Vietnam) Nguyễn Tiến Minh	(Chinese Taipei) Hung Shih-han	(Indonesia) Selvanus Geh (Indonesia) Kevin Sanjaya Sukamuljo	(Japan) Yano Chiemi (Japan) Yumiko Nishiyama	(Indonesia) Alfian Eko Prasetya (Indonesia) Annisa Saufika
2015	(Indonesia) Firman Abdul Kholik	(Japan) Kana Itō	(Chinese Taipei) Lu Ching-yao (Chinese Taipei) Tien Tzu-chieh	(Indonesia) Anggia Shitta Awanda (Indonesia) Ni Ketut Mahadewi Istarani	(Indonesia) Fran Kurniawan (Indonesia) Komala Dewi
2016	(Vietnam) Nguyễn Tiến Minh	(Vietnam) Vũ Thị Trang	(Malaysia) Ong Yew Sin (Malaysia) Teo Ee Yi	(Japan) Yuki Fukushima (Japan) Chiharu Shida	(Japan) Yuta Watanabe (Japan) Arisa Higashino
2017	(Vietnam) Nguyễn Tiến Minh	(Thailand) Pornpawee Chochuwong	(India) Satwiksairaj Rankireddy (India) Chirag Shetty	(Japan) Erina Honda (Japan) Nozomi Shimizu	(China) Shi Longfei (China) Tang Pingyang
2018	(Japan) Kento Momota	(Indonesia) Dinar Dyah Ayustine	(Thailand) Maneepong Jongjit (Thailand) Nanthakarn Yordphaisong	(South Korea) Baek Ha-na (South Korea) Lee Yu-rim	(Vietnam) Đỗ Tuấn Đức (Vietnam) Phạm Như Thảo
2019	(Indonesia) Firman Abdul Kholik	(Japan) Hirari Mizui	(Indonesia) Kenas Adi Haryanto (Indonesia) Rian Agung Saputro	(Indonesia) Nita Violina Marwah (Indonesia) Putri Syaikah	(Japan) Hiroki Midorikawa (Japan) Natsu Saito
2020	Cancelled (Note: This tournament, originally to be played from 24 to 29 March, was later postponed to 2–7 June due to the COVID-19 pandemic in Vietnam. It was officially cancelled on 10 July 2020.)				
2021	Cancelled (Note: This tournament, originally to be played from 6 to 11 July, was later cancelled due to the COVID-19 pandemic in Vietnam.)				
2022	Cancelled (Note: This tournament, originally to be played from 22 to 27 March, was later cancelled due to the COVID-19 pandemic in Vietnam.)				
2023	(Japan) Takuma Obayashi	(Vietnam) Nguyễn Thùy Linh	(South Korea) Jin Yong (South Korea) Na Sung-seung	(South Korea) Lee Yu-lim (South Korea) Shin Seung-chan	(Indonesia) Jafar Hidayatullah (Indonesia) Aisyah Pranata
2024	(Chinese Taipei) Huang Ping-hsien	(South Korea) Sim Yu-jin	(Chinese Taipei) Chiu Hsiang-chieh (Chinese Taipei) Liu Kuang-heng	(Thailand) Laksika Kanlaha (Thailand) Phataimas Muenwong	(Thailand) Pakkapon Teeraratsakul (Thailand) Phataimas Muenwong
2025	(Thailand) Puritat Arree	(Japan) Manami Suizu	(Vietnam) Nguyễn Đình Hoàng (Vietnam) Trần Đình Mạnh	(Japan) Hina Osawa (Japan) Akari Sato	(Hong Kong) Tang Chun Man (Hong Kong) Ng Tsz Yau
2026	(Indonesia) Richie Duta Richardo	(India) Rakshitha Ramraj	(Chinese Taipei) Huang Tsung-i (Chinese Taipei) Lin Ting-yu	(Australia) Gronya Somerville (Canada) Josephine Wu	(Hong Kong) Chan Yin Chak (Hong Kong) Ng Tsz Yau

== Performances by nation ==
As of the 2026 edition

No.	Nation	MS	WS	MD	WD	XD	Total
1	Indonesia	4	3	7	5	6	25
2	Thailand	2	4	2	3	5	16
3	South Korea	2	3	1	6	1	13
4	Japan	2	3	1	4	2	12
5	Chinese Taipei	2	2	4	1	1	10
5	Vietnam	6	2	1		1	10
7	Malaysia	2	2	4		1	9
8	Hong Kong	1		1		3	5
9	China		1		1	1	3
9	Singapore	1			1	1	3
11	India		1	1			2
12	England		1				1
13	Australia				0.5		0.5
13	Canada				0.5		0.5
Total		22	22	22	22	22	110

== See also ==
- Vietnam Open
- Vietnam International Series
