= Fang Chieh-min =

Taiwanese badminton player

Fang Chieh-min 方介民
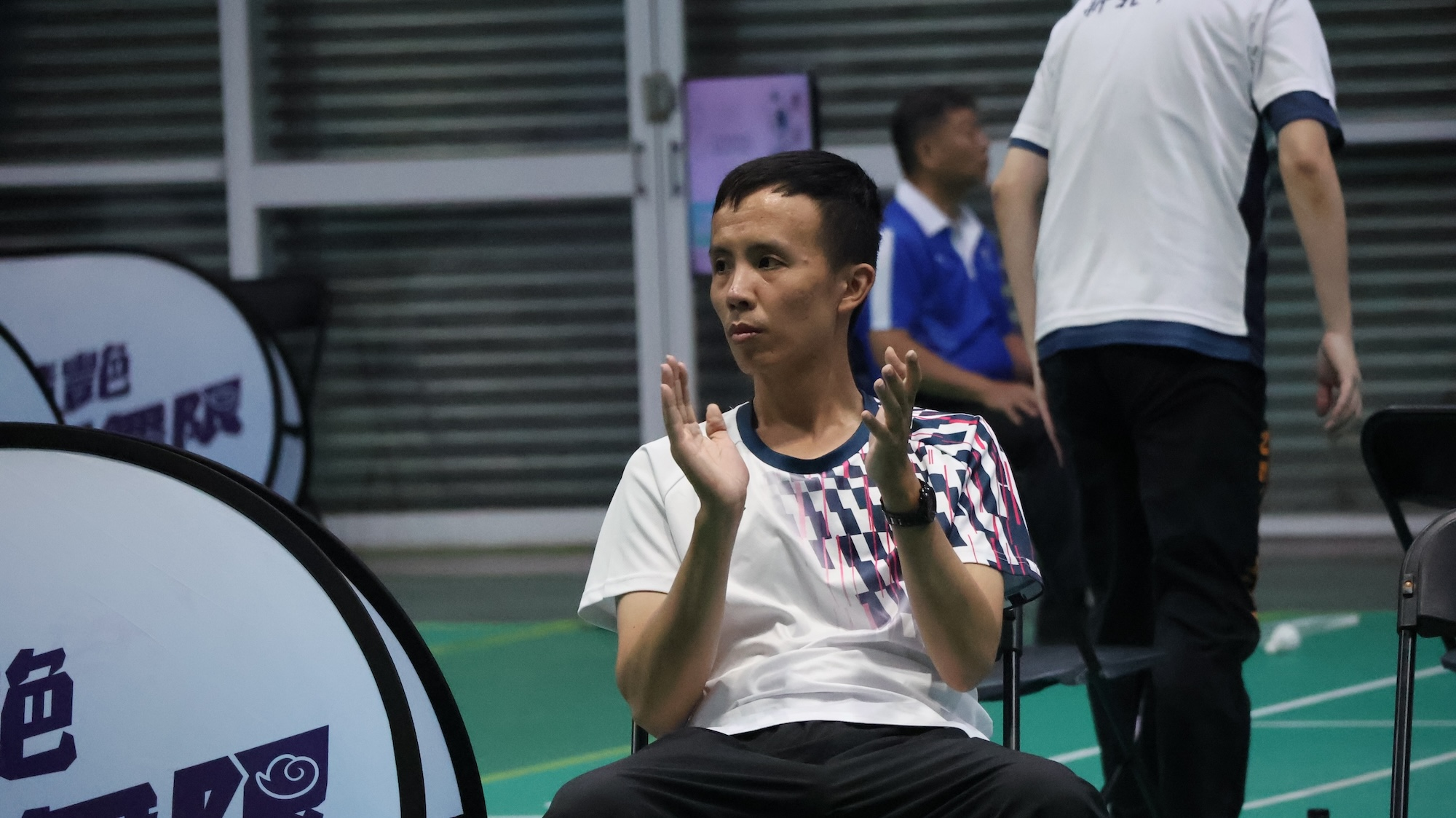

Personal information
- Born: 31 January 1986 (age 40) Taipei, Taiwan
- Height: 1.75 m (5 ft 9 in)
- Weight: 72 kg (159 lb; 11.3 st)

Sport
- Country: Republic of China (Taiwan)
- Sport: Badminton
- Handedness: Right

Men's doubles
- Highest ranking: 3 (9 December 2010)
- BWF profile
Medal record
Men's badminton
Representing Chinese Taipei
Asian Championships
Bronze medal – third place	2008 Johor Bahru	Mixed doubles
Bronze medal – third place	2010 New Delhi	Men's doubles
Summer Universiade
Silver medal – second place	2007 Bangkok	Mixed doubles
Silver medal – second place	2011 Shenzhen	Men's doubles
Bronze medal – third place	2007 Bangkok	Mixed team
Bronze medal – third place	2011 Shenzhen	Mixed team

Fang Chieh-min (Chinese: 方介民; pinyin: Fāng Jièmín; born 31 January 1986) is a Taiwanese badminton player. He paired with Lee Sheng-mu in men's doubles. The pair won 3 BWF Super Series titles including 2010 Singapore Super Series, 2010 Indonesia Super Series and 2012 Malaysia Super Series.

== Achievements ==
=== Asian Championships ===
Men's doubles
Year	Venue	Partner	Opponent	Score	Result
2010	Siri Fort Indoor Stadium; New Delhi, India	(Chinese Taipei) Lee Sheng-mu	(South Korea) Cho Gun-woo (South Korea) Yoo Yeon-seong	18–21, 20–22	Bronze

Mixed doubles
Year	Venue	Partner	Opponent	Score	Result
2008	Bandaraya Stadium; Johor Bahru, Malaysia	(Chinese Taipei) Cheng Wen-hsing	(Indonesia) Flandy Limpele (Indonesia) Vita Marissa	17–21, 16–21	Bronze

=== Summer Universiade ===
Men's doubles
Year	Venue	Partner	Opponent	Score	Result
2011	Gymnasium of SZIIT; Shenzhen, China	(Chinese Taipei) Lee Sheng-mu	(Thailand) Bodin Isara (Thailand) Maneepong Jongjit	10–21, 16–21	Silver

Mixed doubles
Year	Venue	Partner	Opponent	Score	Result
2007	Thammasat University; Pathum Thani, Thailand	(Chinese Taipei) Cheng Wen-hsing	(South Korea) Yoo Yeon Seong (South Korea) Kim Min-jung	19–21, 21–13, 17–21	Silver

=== BWF Superseries ===
The BWF Superseries, which was launched on 14 December 2006 and implemented in 2007, was a series of elite badminton tournaments, sanctioned by the Badminton World Federation (BWF). BWF Superseries levels were Superseries and Superseries Premier. A season of Superseries consisted of twelve tournaments around the world that had been introduced since 2011. Successful players were invited to the Superseries Finals, which were held at the end of each year.

Men's doubles
Year	Tournament	Partner	Opponent	Score	Result
2010	Singapore Open	(Chinese Taipei) Lee Sheng-mu	(United States) Howard Bach (United States) Tony Gunawan	21–14, 21–15	(gold) Winner
2010	Indonesia Open	(Chinese Taipei) Lee Sheng-mu	(South Korea) Cho Gun-woo (South Korea) Kwon Yi-goo	21–16, 21–15	(gold) Winner
2012	Malaysia Open	(Chinese Taipei) Lee Sheng-mu	(South Korea) Cho Gun-woo (South Korea) Shin Baek-cheol	16–21, 21–16, 21–16	(gold) Winner

BWF Super Series Finals tournament
BWF Super Series Premier tournament
BWF Super Series tournament

=== BWF Grand Prix ===
The BWF Grand Prix had two levels, the Grand Prix and Grand Prix Gold. It was a series of badminton tournaments sanctioned by the Badminton World Federation (BWF) and played between 2007 and 2017.

Men's doubles
Year	Tournament	Partner	Opponent	Score	Result
2008	Macau Open	(Chinese Taipei) Lee Sheng-mu	(Malaysia) Koo Kien Keat (Malaysia) Tan Boon Heong	16–21, 18–21	(silver) Runner-up
2010	Canada Open	(Chinese Taipei) Lee Sheng-mu	(Singapore) Hendri Saputra (Singapore) Chayut Triyachart	21–16, 21–16	(gold) Winner
2010	U.S. Open	(Chinese Taipei) Lee Sheng-mu	(Chinese Taipei) Chen Hung-ling (Chinese Taipei) Lin Yu-lang	21–19, 21–14	(gold) Winner
2012	Swiss Open	(Chinese Taipei) Lee Sheng-mu	(Japan) Naoki Kawamae (Japan) Shoji Sato	13–21, 14–21	(silver) Runner-up
2012	Australian Open	(Chinese Taipei) Lee Sheng-mu	(Indonesia) Markis Kido (Indonesia) Hendra Setiawan	16–21, 15–21	(silver) Runner-up

Mixed doubles
Year	Tournament	Partner	Opponent	Score	Result
2007	Macau Open	(Chinese Taipei) Cheng Wen-hsing	(China) Xie Zhongbo (China) Zhang Yawen	14–21, 16–21	(silver) Runner-up
2008	Chinese Taipei Open	(Chinese Taipei) Cheng Wen-hsing	(Indonesia) Devin Lahardi Fitriawan (Indonesia) Lita Nurlita	21–14, 11–21, 19–21	(silver) Runner-up

BWF Grand Prix Gold tournament
BWF Grand Prix tournament
