= Kim Dong-heon =

Kim Dong-heon (Korean: 김동헌) is the name of:

- Kim Dong-heon (footballer) (born 1997), South Korean footballer
- Kim Dong-heon (baseball) (born 2004), South Korean baseball player
