= Lin Yu-lang =

Taiwanese badminton player (born 1985)

Lin Yu-lang 林祐瑯
Personal information
- Born: 25 December 1985 (age 40) Taiwan
- Height: 1.74 m (5 ft 9 in)

Sport
- Country: Taiwan
- Sport: Badminton
- Handedness: Right

Men's & mixed doubles
- Highest ranking: 8 (MD) 25 March 2010; 60 (XD) 21 June 2012
- BWF profile
Medal record
Men's badminton
Representing Chinese Taipei
Asian Championships
| Silver medal – second place | 2010 New Delhi | Men's doubles |
East Asian Games
| Silver medal – second place | 2009 Hong Kong | Men's doubles |
| Bronze medal – third place | 2009 Hong Kong | Men's team |

Lin Yu-lang (Chinese: 林祐瑯; pinyin: Lín Yòuláng; born 25 December 1985) is a Taiwanese badminton player. In 2008, he won the BWF Grand Prix title at the New Zealand Open in the men's doubles event with Chen Hung-ling. In 2009, he and Chen also won the Chinese Taipei Open, Polish International, and Finnish International. Lin was the men's doubles silver medallists at the 2009 East Asian Games and 2010 Asian Championships.

== Achievements ==
=== Asian Championships ===
Men's doubles
| Year | Venue | Partner | Opponent | Score | Result |
|---|---|---|---|---|---|
| 2010 | Siri Fort Indoor Stadium; New Delhi, India | (Chinese Taipei) Chen Hung-ling | (South Korea) Cho Gun-woo (South Korea) Yoo Yeon-seong | 19–21, 21–12, 17–21 | Silver |

=== East Asian Games ===
Men's doubles
| Year | Venue | Partner | Opponent | Score | Result |
|---|---|---|---|---|---|
| 2009 | Queen Elizabeth Stadium; Hong Kong | (Chinese Taipei) Chen Hung-ling | (Chinese Taipei) Hu Chung-hsien (Chinese Taipei) Tsai Chia-hsin | 17–21, 20–22 | Silver |

=== BWF Grand Prix ===
The BWF Grand Prix has two levels: Grand Prix and Grand Prix Gold. It is a series of badminton tournaments, sanctioned by the Badminton World Federation (BWF) since 2007.

Men's doubles
| Year | Tournament | Partner | Opponent | Score | Result |
|---|---|---|---|---|---|
| 2010 | U.S. Open | (Chinese Taipei) Chen Hung-ling | (Chinese Taipei) Fang Chieh-min (Chinese Taipei) Lee Sheng-mu | 19–21, 14–21 | (silver) Runner-up |
| 2010 | German Open | (Chinese Taipei) Chen Hung-ling | (China) Chai Biao (China) Zhang Nan | 21–17, 13–21, 15–21 | (silver) Runner-up |
| 2009 | Chinese Taipei Open | (Chinese Taipei) Chen Hung-ling | (Hong Kong) Yohan Hadikusumo Wiratama (Hong Kong) Wong Wai Hong | 14–21, 21–12, 21–19 | (gold) Winner |
| 2008 | New Zealand Open | (Chinese Taipei) Chen Hung-ling | (Indonesia) Fernando Kurniawan (Indonesia) Lingga Lie | 22–20, 21–10 | (gold) Winner |

BWF Grand Prix Gold tournament
BWF Grand Prix tournament

=== BWF International Challenge/Series ===
Men's doubles
| Year | Tournament | Partner | Opponent | Score | Result |
|---|---|---|---|---|---|
| 2009 | Finnish International | (Chinese Taipei) Chen Hung-ling | (Denmark) Rasmus Bonde (Denmark) Mikkel Delbo Larsen | 21–19, 21–16 | (gold) Winner |
| 2009 | Polish International | (Chinese Taipei) Chen Hung-ling | (Denmark) Kasper Faust Henriksen (Denmark) Christian John Skovgaard | 21–14, 17–21, 21–19 | (gold) Winner |
| 2008 | Italian International | (Chinese Taipei) Chen Hung-ling | (Germany) Kristof Hopp (Germany) Johannes Schöttler | 20–22, 13–21 | (silver) Runner-up |
| 2008 | Hellas International | (Chinese Taipei) Chen Hung-ling | (Chinese Taipei) Chien Yu-hsun (Chinese Taipei) Lin Yen-jui | 19–21, 20–22 | (silver) Runner-up |
| 2008 | Australian International | (Chinese Taipei) Chien Yu-hsun | (South Korea) Choi Sang-won (South Korea) Kim Sa-rang | 17–21, 21–16, 11–21 | (silver) Runner-up |

BWF International Challenge tournament
BWF International Series tournament
