= Devin Lahardi Fitriawan =

Indonesian badminton player (born 1983)

Personal information
- Born: 28 July 1983 (age 43) Tasikmalaya, West Java, Indonesia

Sport
- Country: Indonesia
- Sport: Badminton

Mixed doubles
- Highest ranking: 13 (11 March 2010)
- BWF profile
Medal record
Men's badminton
Representing Indonesia
Sudirman Cup
Bronze medal – third place	2009 Guangzhou	Mixed team
Asian Championships
Bronze medal – third place	2007 Johor Bahru	Mixed doubles
Bronze medal – third place	2010 Johor Bahru	Mixed doubles
Southeast Asian Games
Gold medal – first place	2009 Vientiane	Men's team
Asian Junior Championships
Bronze medal – third place	2001 Taipei	Boys' doubles
Bronze medal – third place	2001 Taipei	Mixed doubles
Bronze medal – third place	2001 Taipei	Boys' team

Devin Lahardi Fitriawan (born 28 July 1983) is an Indonesian badminton player from the Tangkas Alfamart club. Born in Tasikmalaya, West Java, Fitriawan joined the national team in 2003. He was part of the Indonesia junior team that won the bronze medals at the 2001 Asian Junior Championships in the boys' doubles, mixed doubles, and boys' team event. In the senior event, Fitriawan plays in the mixed doubles event. Teamed-up with Lita Nurlita they won the title at the 2007 New Zealand Open and 2008 Chinese Taipei Open. He also won the 2010 Malaysia Grand Prix Gold partnered with Liliyana Natsir.

Fitriawan married general practitioner Fenny Novita Dewiand from Surabaya, East Java, on 10 October 2010.

== Achievements ==
=== Asian Championships ===
Mixed doubles
Year	Venue	Partner	Opponent	Score	Result
2007	Stadium Bandaraya; Johor Bahru, Malaysia	(Indonesia) Lita Nurlita	(China) He Hanbin (China) Yu Yang	16–21, 12–21	Bronze
2010	Stadium Bandaraya; Johor Bahru, Malaysia	(Indonesia) Liliyana Natsir	(Malaysia) Chan Peng Soon (Malaysia) Goh Liu Ying	21–12, 19–21, 15–21	Bronze

=== Asian Junior Championships ===
Boys' doubles
Year	Venue	Partner	Opponent	Score	Result
2001	Taipei Gymnasium; Taipei, Taiwan	(Indonesia) Titon Gustaman	(Thailand) Songphon Anugritayawon (Thailand) Adisak Wiriyapadungpong	17–14, 9–15, 10–15	Bronze

Mixed doubles
Year	Venue	Partner	Opponent	Score	Result
2001	Taipei Gymnasium; Taipei, Taiwan	(Indonesia) Endang Nursugianti	(South Korea)		Bronze

=== BWF Grand Prix ===
The BWF Grand Prix had two levels, the BWF Grand Prix and Grand Prix Gold. It was a series of badminton tournaments sanctioned by the Badminton World Federation (BWF) which was held from 2007 to 2017. The World Badminton Grand Prix sanctioned by International Badminton Federation (IBF) from 1983 to 2006.

Mixed doubles
Year	Tournament	Partner	Opponent	Score	Result
2005	Chinese Taipei Open	(Indonesia) Vita Marissa	(United States) Tony Gunawan (Chinese Taipei) Cheng Wen-hsing	15–17, 6–15	(silver) Runner-up
2007	New Zealand Open	(Indonesia) Lita Nurlita	(Indonesia) Anggun Nugroho (Indonesia) Nitya Krishinda Maheswari	21–16, 21–15	(gold) Winner
2008	Chinese Taipei Open	(Indonesia) Lita Nurlita	(Chinese Taipei) Fang Chieh-min (Chinese Taipei) Cheng Wen-hsing	14–21, 21–11, 21–19	(gold) Winner
2010	Malaysia Grand Prix Gold	(Indonesia) Liliyana Natsir	(Thailand) Sudket Prapakamol (Thailand) Saralee Thungthongkam	13–21, 21–16, 21–17	(gold) Winner

BWF Grand Prix Gold tournament
BWF Grand Prix tournament

== Performance timeline ==
=== National team ===
- Junior level

Team event	2001
Asian Junior Championships	Bronze

- Senior level

Team event	2009
Southeast Asian Games	Gold

Team event	2009
Sudirman Cup	Bronze

=== Individual competitions ===
- Junior level

Event	2001
Asian Junior Championships	Bronze (BD); Bronze (XD)

- Senior level

Event	2007
Asian Championships	Bronze (XD)

Event	2009
World Championships	R3 (XD)

Tournament	2007	2008	2009	2010	2011	2012	2013	2014	2015	2016	2017	Best
BWF Grand Prix and Grand Prix Gold
Malaysia Masters	—N/a		A	W	W (2010)							
