= Shenzhen Institute of Information Technology =

College in China

Shenzhen University of Information Technology
- 深圳信息职业技术大学
- Type: Public College
- Established: 2002; 24 years ago
- President: Wang Hui (王晖)
- Location: Shenzhen, Guangdong, China
- Campus: 925,000 square metres (9,960,000 ft^{2})
- Website: sziit.edu.cn

Chinese name
- Simplified Chinese: 深圳信息职业技术大学
- Traditional Chinese: 深圳信息職業技術大學
Transcriptions
Standard Mandarin
- Hanyu Pinyin: Shēnzhèn Xìnxī Zhíyè Jìshù Dàxué
Yue: Cantonese
- Jyutping: sam1 zan3 seon3 sik1 zik1 jip6 gei6 seot6 daai6 hok6

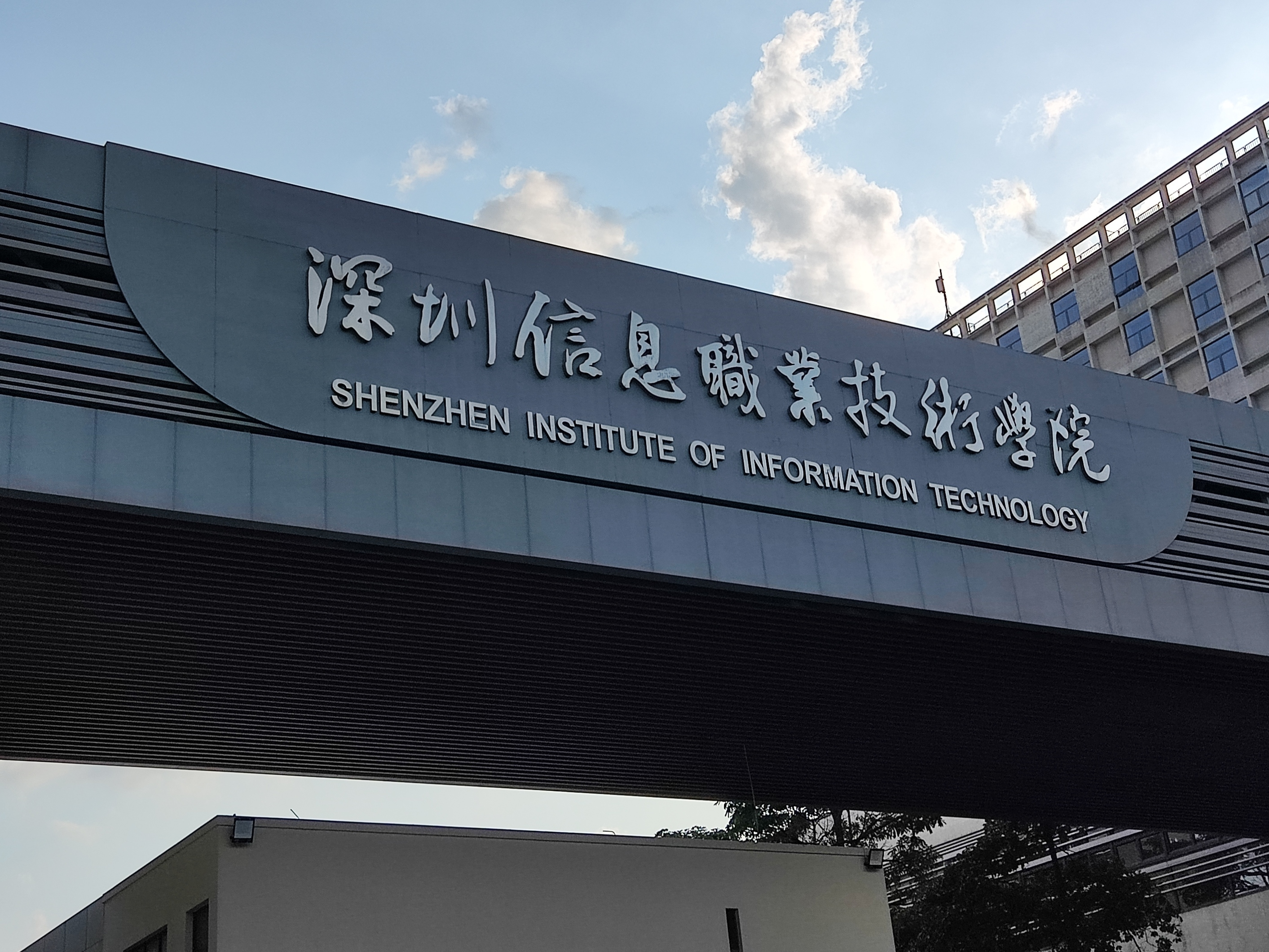
School gate

Shenzhen University of Information Technology (SUIT; 深圳信息职业技术大学) is a public college in Shenzhen, Guangdong, China. The institution is sponsored by the Shenzhen People's Government.

== Overview ==
SUIT is the National Demonstration Software Vocational Institution and Pilot School of the 'Sino-German Automotive Vocational Education Project' launched by the Ministry of Education. The college offers three-year junior college programs, four-year undergraduate programs and postgraduate programs.

== History ==
Three schools established back in 1982, namely Shenzhen Institute of Education (深圳教育学院), Shenzhen Industrial School (深圳市工业学校) and Shenzhen School of Finance and Economics (深圳市财经学校).

As the three schools merged in April 2002, Shenzhen Institute of Information Technology (SZIIT) is a public full-time institution providing higher education in Shenzhen.

In 2019, SZIIT as one of the first batch of schools involved in High Level Higher Vocational School and Disciplinary Development Plan with Chinese Characteristics.

In 2025, Shenzhen Institute of Information Technology was renamed Shenzhen University of Information Technology (SUIT).

== Faculties ==
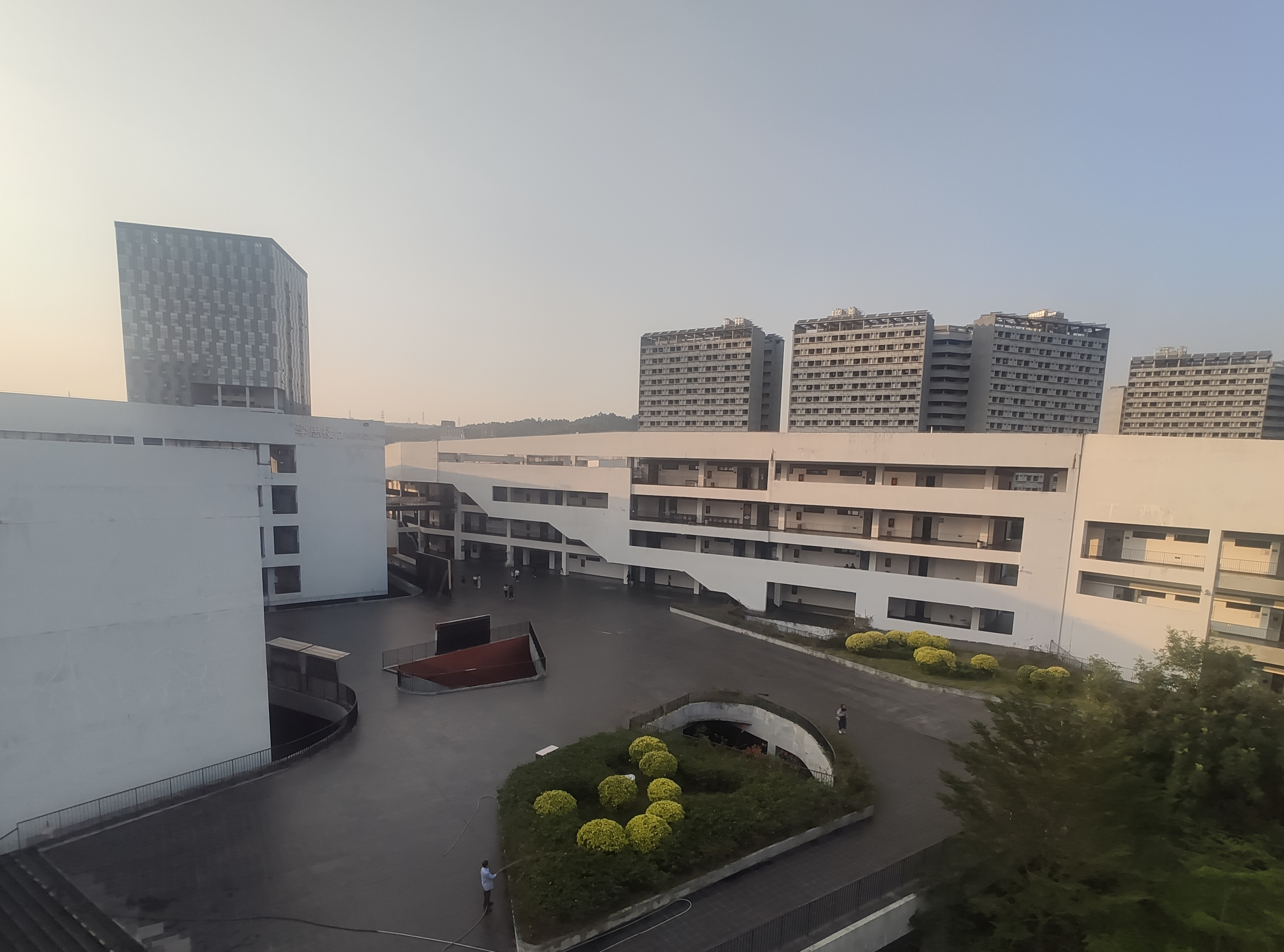
School building

The college has 11 schools, which are:

- School of Computer Science
- School of Software Engineering
- School of Foreign Languages
- School of Information and Telecommunication
- School of Microelectronics
- School of Digital Media
- School of Intelligent Manufacturing and Equipment
- School of Traffic and Environment
- School of Management
- School of Finance and Economics
- School of Sino-German Robotics Academy

== Staff ==
There are 1577 faculty members, including 944 full-time teachers, 430 of whom are doctors, accounting for 50% of the faculty team; 89% of teachers are qualified both as academic lecturer and career mentor.

== Campus ==
- Headquarters: No. 2188, Longxiang Blvd., Longgang District, Shenzhen, Guangdong, China
- The campus covers an area of 925,000 square meters (1,389 mu), with a construction area of 584,800 square meters.

== Rankings and reputation ==
=== Nature Index ===
Nature Index tracks the affiliations of high-quality scientific articles and presents research outputs by institution and country on a monthly basis.

Year	Rank	Valuer
2023	489	Nature Index - Academic Institutions - China
