= 2005 Asian Junior Badminton Championships – Boys' team =

Badminton championship in Jakarta, Indonesia

Boys' team at the 2005 Asian Junior Badminton Championships
- Venue: Tennis Indoor Senayan
- Location: Jakarta, Indonesia
- Dates: 11–14 July 2005

The boys' team tournament at the 2005 Asian Junior Badminton Championships took place from 11 to 14 July 2005 at the Tennis Indoor Senayan Stadium in Jakarta, Indonesia. A total of 16 countries competed in this event.

== Results ==
=== Bracket ===
Round of 32
Vietnam	3
Maldives	0
Japan	3
Iran	0

Round of 16
China	3
Syria	0
India	3
Vietnam	2
Malaysia	3
Cambodia	0
Chinese Taipei	3
Singapore	0
Indonesia	3
Mongolia	0
Sri Lanka	1
Hong Kong	3
Japan	3
Myanmar	0
Iraq	0
South Korea	3

Quarter-finals
China	3
India	0
Malaysia	3
Chinese Taipei	1
Indonesia	3
Hong Kong	0
Japan	1
South Korea	3

Semi-finals
China	3
Malaysia	0
Indonesia	2
South Korea	3

Final
China	1
South Korea	3

=== Semi-finals ===
China
3
Tennis Indoor Senayan
13 July 2005

Malaysia
0

			1	2	3
1	(China) (Malaysia)	Chen Tianyu; Chong Wei Feng	15; 0	8; 15	15; 0
2	(China) (Malaysia)	Shen Ye / Zhang Wei; Goh Ying Jin / Tan Boon Heong	15; 8	15; 11
3	(China) (Malaysia)	Lu Qicheng; Liew Daren	15; 7	15; 2
4	(China) (Malaysia)	Hu Wenqing / Li Tian; Chan Kwong Beng / Chong Li Qun				not played
5	(China) (Malaysia)	Du Pengyu; Mohamad Arif Abdul Latif				not played

South Korea
3
Tennis Indoor Senayan
13 July 2005

Indonesia
2

			1	2	3
1	(South Korea) (Indonesia)	Choi Sang-won; Fauzi Adnan	13; 15	12; 15
2	(South Korea) (Indonesia)	Cho Gun-woo / Lee Yong-dae; Tontowi Ahmad / Syarifuddin	15; 4	15; 12
3	(South Korea) (Indonesia)	Han Ki-hoon; Sakti Kusuma	15; 11	15; 12
4	(South Korea) (Indonesia)	Kwon Yi-goo / Son Wan-ho; Mohammad Ahsan / Viki Indra Okvana	12; 15	5; 15
5	(South Korea) (Indonesia)	Hong Ji-hoon; Andreas Adityawarman	9; 15	15; 13	13; 8	retired

=== Final ===
China
1
Tennis Indoor Senayan
14 July 2005

South Korea
3

			1	2	3
1	(China) (South Korea)	Chen Tianyu; Choi Sang-won	10; 15	8; 15
2	(China) (South Korea)	Shen Ye / Zhang Wei; Cho Gun-woo / Lee Yong-dae	12; 15	11; 15
3	(China) (South Korea)	Lu Qicheng; Han Ki-hoon	15; 2	15; 10
4	(China) (South Korea)	Hu Wenqing / Li Tian; Kwon Yi-goo / Son Wan-ho	16; 17	12; 15
5	(China) (South Korea)	Du Pengyu; Hong Ji-hoon				not played
