= 2010 BWF Grand Prix Gold and Grand Prix =

The 2010 BWF Grand Prix Gold and Grand Prix was the fourth season of BWF Grand Prix Gold and Grand Prix.

== Schedule ==
Below is the schedule released by Badminton World Federation:

Tour	Tournament	Venue	City	Date		Report
Tour	Tournament	Venue	City	Start	Finish	Report
1	German Open Grand Prix	RWE-Sporthalle	Mülheim	March 2	March 7	Report
2	India Open Grand Prix Gold	Jawaharlal Nehru Stadium	Chennai	June 8	June 13	Report
3	Russia Open Grand Prix	Sports Hall Olympic	Vladivostok	June 29	July 4	Report
4	Malaysia Open Grand Prix Gold	Stadium Bandaraya	Johor Bahru	July 6	July 11	Report
5	Australian Open Grand Prix	Melbourne Sports and Aquatic Centre	Melbourne	July 13	July 18	Report
6	Canada Open Grand Prix	Richmond Oval	Richmond	July 13	July 18	Report
7	U.S. Open Grand Prix Gold	Orange County Badminton Club	Orange	July 20	July 25	Report
8	Macau Open Grand Prix Gold	Cotai Arena	Macau	July 27	August 1	Report
9	Chinese Taipei Open Grand Prix Gold	Xinzhuang Gymnasium	New Taipei City	August 3	August 8	Report
10	Bitburger Open Grand Prix Gold	Saarlandhalle	Saarbrücken	August 31	September 5	Report
11	Vietnam Open Grand Prix	Phan Dinh Phung Stadium	Ho Chi Minh City	October 5	October 10	Report
12	Indonesia Open Grand Prix Gold	GOR Bulutangkis Palaran	Samarinda	October 12	October 17	Report
13	Dutch Open Grand Prix	Topsportcentrum Almere	Almere	October 19	October 24	Report
14	Korea Grand Prix	Gimcheon City Indoor Stadium	Gimcheon	November 23	November 28	Report
15	India Open Grand Prix	Babu Banarasi Das Indoor Stadium	Lucknow	December 14	December 19	Report

Grand Prix Gold

== Results ==
=== Winners ===
Tour	Men's singles	Women's singles	Men's doubles	Women's doubles	Mixed doubles
(Germany) German Open Grand Prix	(China) Bao Chunlai	(China) Wang Xin	(China) Chai Biao / Zhang Nan	(China) Ma Jin / Wang Xiaoli	(Hong Kong) Yohan Hadikusumo Wiratama / Tse Ying Suet
India Open Grand Prix Gold	(Indonesia) Alamsyah Yunus	(India) Saina Nehwal	(Malaysia) Mohd Zakry Abdul Latif / Mohd Fairuzizuan Mohd Tazari	(Singapore) Shinta Mulia Sari / Yao Lei	(India) Valiyaveetil Diju / Jwala Gutta
Russia Open Grand Prix	(Japan) Takuma Ueda	(Japan) Ayane Kurihara	(Russia) Vladimir Ivanov / Ivan Sozonov	(Russia) Valeria Sorokina / Nina Vislova	(Russia) Alexandr Nikolaenko / Valeria Sorokina
Malaysia Open Grand Prix Gold	(Malaysia) Lee Chong Wei	(Hong Kong) Yip Pui Yin	(Indonesia) Markis Kido / Hendra Setiawan	(Thailand) Duanganong Aroonkesorn / Kunchala Voravichitchaikul	(Indonesia) Devin Lahardi Fitriawan / Lilyana Natsir
(Australia) Australian Open Grand Prix	(Vietnam) Nguyen Tien Minh	(South Korea) Seo Yoon-hee	(Japan) Hiroyuki Endo / Kenichi Hayakawa	(South Korea) Kim Min-seo / Lee Kyung-won	(South Korea) Cho Gun-woo / Kim Min-seo
(Singapore) Canada Open Grand Prix	(Indonesia) Taufik Hidayat	(China) Zhu Lin	(Chinese Taipei) Fang Chieh-min / Lee Sheng-mu	(Chinese Taipei) Cheng Wen-hsing / Chien Yu-chin	(Chinese Taipei) Lee Sheng-mu / Chien Yu-chin
(United States) U.S. Open Grand Prix Gold	(England) Rajiv Ouseph	(China) Zhu Lin	(Chinese Taipei) Fang Chieh-min / Lee Sheng-mu	(Chinese Taipei) Cheng Wen-hsing / Chien Yu-chin	(Germany) Michael Fuchs / Birgit Overzier
Macau Open Grand Prix Gold	(Malaysia) Lee Chong Wei	(China) Li Xuerui	(South Korea) Ko Sung-hyun / Yoo Yeon-seong	(Chinese Taipei) Cheng Wen-hsing / Chien Yu-chin	(Indonesia) Tontowi Ahmad / Lilyana Natsir
Chinese Taipei Open Grand Prix Gold	(Indonesia) Simon Santoso	(Chinese Taipei) Cheng Shao-chieh	(South Korea) Jung Jae-sung / Lee Yong-dae	(South Korea) Kim Min-jung / Lee Hyo-jung	(Indonesia) Hendra Aprida Gunawan / Vita Marissa
(Germany) Bitburger Open Grand Prix Gold	(China) Chen Long	(China) Liu Xin	(Denmark) Mathias Boe / Carsten Mogensen	(China) Pan Pan / Tian Qing	(China) Zhang Nan / Zhao Yunlei
Vietnam Open Grand Prix	(China) Chen Yuekun	(Thailand) Ratchanok Inthanon	(Indonesia) Mohammad Ahsan / Bona Septano	(China) Ma Jin / Zhong Qianxin	(China) He Hanbin / Ma Jin
Indonesia Open Grand Prix Gold	(Indonesia) Taufik Hidayat	(Thailand) Ratchanok Inthanon	(Indonesia) Mohammad Ahsan / Bona Septano	(China) Luo Ying / Luo Yu	(Indonesia) Tontowi Ahmad / Lilyana Natsir
(Netherlands) Dutch Open Grand Prix	(Japan) Sho Sasaki	(Germany) Juliane Schenk	(Japan) Hirokatsu Hashimoto / Noriyasu Hirata	(Russia) Valeria Sorokina / Nina Vislova	(Russia) Alexander Nikolaenko / Valeria Sorokina
(South Korea) Korea Grand Prix	(China) Bao Chunlai	(China) Liu Xin	(South Korea) Jung Jae-sung / Lee Yong-dae	(South Korea) Jung Kyung-eun / Yoo Hyun-young	(South Korea) Yoo Yeon-seong / Kim Min-jung
India Open Grand Prix	(Indonesia) Dionysius Hayom Rumbaka	(China) Zhou Hui	(Indonesia) Mohammad Ahsan / Bona Septano	(China) Tang Jinhua / Xia Huan	(China) Liu Peixuan / Tang Jinhua

== Grand Prix Gold ==
India Open

- June 8–June 13, Jawaharlal Nehru Stadium, Chennai, India.

Category	Winners	Runners-up	Score
Men's singles	(Indonesia) Alamsyah Yunus	(India) R.M.V. Gurusaidutt	21–13, 21–18
Women's singles	(India) Saina Nehwal	(Malaysia) Wong Mew Choo	20–22, 21–14, 21–12
Men's doubles	(Malaysia) Mohd Zakry Abdul Latif / Mohd Fairuzizuan Mohd Tazari	(India) Rupesh Kumar / Sanave Thomas	21–12, 22–20
Women's doubles	(Singapore) Shinta Mulia Sari / Yao Lei	(India) Jwala Gutta / Ashwini Ponnappa	21–11, 9–21, 21–15
Mixed doubles	(India) Valiyaveetil Diju / Jwala Gutta	(Singapore) Chayut Triyachart / Yao Lei	23–21, 20–22, 21–7

Malaysia Open Grand Prix Gold

- July 6–July 11, Johor Bahru City Stadium, Johor Bahru, Johor, Malaysia.

Category	Winners	Runners-up	Score
Men's singles	(Malaysia) Lee Chong Wei	(Malaysia) Wong Choong Hann	21–8, 14–21, 21–15
Women's singles	(Hong Kong) Yip Pui Yin	(Hong Kong) Zhou Mi	21–16, 14–21, 21–19
Men's doubles	(Indonesia) Markis Kido / Hendra Setiawan	(Indonesia) Hendra Aprida Gunawan / Alvent Yulianto	8–21, 21–17, 21–12
Women's doubles	(Thailand) Duanganong Aroonkesorn / Kunchala Voravichitchaikul	(Malaysia) Ng Hui Ern / Ng Hui Lin	12–21, 21–17, 21–13
Mixed doubles	(Indonesia) Devin Lahardi Fitriawan / Lilyana Natsir	(Thailand) Sudket Prapakamol / Saralee Thungthongkam	13–21, 21–16, 21–17

U.S. Open

- July 19–24, Orange County Badminton Club, Orange County, California, United States.

Category	Winners	Runners-up	Score
Men's singles	(England) Rajiv Ouseph	(France) Brice Leverdez	21–17, 21–9
Women's singles	(China) Zhu Lin	(Netherlands) Judith Meulendijks	21–19, 11–6 (Retired)
Men's doubles	(Chinese Taipei) Fang Chieh-min / Lee Sheng-mu	(Chinese Taipei) Chen Hung-ling / Lin Yu-lang	21–19, 21–14
Women's doubles	(Chinese Taipei) Cheng Wen-hsing / Chien Yu-chin	(Japan) Rie Eto / Yu Wakita	21–8, 22–20
Mixed doubles	(Germany) Michael Fuchs / Birgit Overzier	(Chinese Taipei) Lee Sheng-mu / Chien Yu-chin	21–19, 21–14

Macau Open

- July 27–August 1, Cotai Arena, Taipa, Macau.

Category	Winners	Runners-up	Score
Men's singles	(Malaysia) Lee Chong Wei	(South Korea) Lee Hyun-il	No match
Women's singles	(China) Li Xuerui	(Indonesia) Adriyanti Firdasari	21–18, 21–15
Men's doubles	(South Korea) Ko Sung-hyun / Yoo Yeon-seong	(Indonesia) Hendra Aprida Gunawan / Alvent Yulianto	21–17, 21–15
Women's doubles	(Chinese Taipei) Cheng Wen-hsing / Chien Yu-chin	(Indonesia) Meiliana Jauhari / Greysia Polii	16–21, 21–18, 21–16
Mixed doubles	(Indonesia) Tontowi Ahmad / Lilyana Natsir	(Indonesia) Hendra Aprida Gunawan / Vita Marissa	21–14, 21–18

Chinese Taipei Open

- August 3–8, Taipei County Shinjuang Stadium, Taipei County, Republic of China (Taiwan).

Category	Winners	Runners-up	Score
Men's singles	(Indonesia) Simon Santoso	(South Korea) Shon Wan-ho	21–14, 21–11
Women's singles	(Chinese Taipei) Cheng Shao-chieh	(South Korea) Bae Seung-hee	21–11, 24–26, 21–17
Men's doubles	(South Korea) Jung Jae-sung / Lee Yong-dae	(South Korea) Cho Gun-woo / Kwon Yi-goo	21–10, 21–16
Women's doubles	(South Korea) Kim Min-jung / Lee Hyo-jung	(South Korea) Lee Kyung-won / Yoo Hyun-young	21–14, 22–20
Mixed doubles	(Indonesia) Hendra Aprida Gunawan / Vita Marissa	(Indonesia) Tontowi Ahmad / Lilyana Natsir	22–20, 14–21, 22–20

Bitburger Open

- August 31–September 5, Saarlandhalle, Saarbrücken, Germany.

Category	Winners	Runners-up	Score
Men's singles	(China) Chen Long	(Denmark) Hans-Kristian Vittinghus	21–3, 12–21, 21–9
Women's singles	(China) Liu Xin	(Macau) Wang Rong	21–16, 21–10
Men's doubles	(Denmark) Mathias Boe / Carsten Mogensen	(Germany) Ingo Kindervater / Johannes Schöttler	21–16, 21–16
Women's doubles	(China) Pan Pan / Tian Qing	(Netherlands) Lotte Bruil-Jonathans / Pauline van Dooremalen	21–7, 21–10
Mixed doubles	(China) Zhang Nan / Zhao Yunlei	(Germany) Michael Fuchs / Birgit Overzier	22–20, 21–9

Indonesia Open Grand Prix Gold

- October 12–17, Palaran Samarinda, East Kalimantan, Indonesia.

Category	Winners	Runners-up	Score
Men's singles	(Indonesia) Taufik Hidayat	(Indonesia) Dionysius Hayom Rumbaka	26–28, 21–17, 21–14
Women's singles	(Thailand) Ratchanok Inthanon	(Chinese Taipei) Cheng Shao-chieh	21–12, 19–21, 21–16
Men's doubles	(Indonesia) Mohammad Ahsan / Bona Septano	(Indonesia) Yonathan Suryatama Dasuki / Rian Sukmawan	21–16, 18–17 (Retired)
Women's doubles	(China) Luo Ying / Luo Yu	(Indonesia) Meiliana Jauhari / Greysia Polii	11–21, 21–18, 21–11
Mixed doubles	(Indonesia) Tontowi Ahmad / Lilyana Natsir	(Indonesia) Markis Kido / Lita Nurlita	21–11, 21–13

== Grand Prix ==
German Open

- March 2–March 7, RWE Rhein-Ruhr Sporthalle, Mülheim, Germany.

Category	Winners	Runners-up	Score
Men's singles	(China) Bao Chunlai	(China) Chen Long	21–13, 21–10
Women's singles	(China) Wang Xin	(Germany) Juliane Schenk	21–17, 21–18
Men's doubles	(China) Chai Biao / Zhang Nan	(Chinese Taipei) Chen Hung-ling / Lin Yu-lang	17–21, 21–13, 21–15
Women's doubles	(China) Ma Jin / Wang Xiaoli	(China) Cheng Shu / Zhao Yunlei	24–22, 21–15
Mixed doubles	(Hong Kong) Yohan Hadikusumo Wiratama / Tse Ying Suet	(England) Robert Blair / (Scotland) Imogen Bankier	15–5, retired

Russian Open

- June 29–July 4, Sports Hall Olympic, Vladivostok, Russia.

Category	Winners	Runners-up	Score
Men's singles	(Japan) Takuma Ueda	(Russia) Stanislav Pukhov	21–17, 21–17
Women's singles	(Japan) Ayane Kurihara	(Russia) Ella Diehl	21–19, 21–19
Men's doubles	(Russia) Vladimir Ivanov / Ivan Sozonov	(Russia) Vitalij Durkin / Alexandr Nikolaenko	21–17, 10–21, 21–18
Women's doubles	(Russia) Valeria Sorokina / Nina Vislova	(Japan) Yuriko Miki / Koharu Yonemoto	21–18, 21–18
Mixed doubles	(Russia) Alexandr Nikolaenko / Valeria Sorokina	(Russia) Vitalij Durkin / Nina Vislova	8–21, 21–14, 21–16

Australian Open

- July 13–July 18, Melbourne Sports and Aquatic Centre, Melbourne, Australia.

Category	Winners	Runners-up	Score
Men's singles	(Vietnam) Nguyen Tien Minh	(Malaysia) Yogendran Khrishnan	21–14, 21–11
Women's singles	(South Korea) Seo Yoon-hee	(Japan) Minatsu Mitani	22–20, 14–21, 21–19
Men's doubles	(Japan) Hiroyuki Endo / Kenichi Hayakawa	(South Korea) Kang Woo-kyum / Park Tae-sang	21–15, 21–16
Women's doubles	(South Korea) Kim Min-seo / Lee Kyung-won	(South Korea) Kang Hae-won / Seo Yoon-hee	21–17, 21–17
Mixed doubles	(South Korea) Cho Gun-woo / Kim Min-seo	(Japan) Hajime Komiyama / Sayuri Asahara	21–14, 21–10

Canadian Open

- July 13–July 18, Richmond Oval, Richmond, Canada.

Category	Winners	Runners-up	Score
Men's singles	(Indonesia) Taufik Hidayat	(France) Brice Leverdez	21–15, 21–11
Women's singles	(China) Zhu Lin	(Germany) Juliane Schenk	21–19, 17–21, 21–10
Men's doubles	(Chinese Taipei) Fang Chieh-min / Lee Sheng-mu	(Singapore) Hendri Kurniawan Saputra / Chayut Triyachart	21–16, 21–16
Women's doubles	(Chinese Taipei) Cheng Wen-hsing / Chien Yu-chin	(Germany) Sandra Marinello / Birgit Overzier	21–16, 18–21, 21–17
Mixed doubles	(Chinese Taipei) Lee Sheng-mu / Chien Yu-chin	(Chinese Taipei) Chen Hung-ling / Cheng Wen-hsing	21–16, 11–21, 21–15

Vietnam Open

- October 5–10, Phan Dinh Phung Stadium, Ho Chi Minh City, Vietnam.

Category	Winners	Runners-up	Score
Men's singles	(China) Chen Yuekun	(Hong Kong) Wei Nan	21–13, 21–14
Women's singles	(Thailand) Ratchanok Inthanon	(China) Zhou Hui	21–17, 22–20
Men's doubles	(Indonesia) Mohammad Ahsan / Bona Septano	(Malaysia) Ong Soon Hock / Mohd Fairuzizuan Mohd Tazari	21–18, 13–21, 21–17
Women's doubles	(China) Ma Jin / Zhong Qianxin	(China) Tang Jinhua / Xia Huan	21–19, 21–23, 21–13
Mixed doubles	(China) He Hanbin / Ma Jin	(Hong Kong) Yohan Hadikusumo Wiratama / Tse Ying Suet	21–18, 21–11

Dutch Open

- October 19–24, Topsportcentrum Almere, Almere, Netherlands.

Category	Winners	Runners-up	Score
Men's singles	(Japan) Sho Sasaki	(India) Ajay Jayaram	21–16, 21–19
Women's singles	(Germany) Juliane Schenk	(Netherlands) Yao Jie	21–13, 14–21, 21–15
Men's doubles	(Japan) Hirokatsu Hashimoto / Noriyasu Hirata	(Japan) Yoshiteru Hirobe / Kenta Kazuno	21–17, 21–13
Women's doubles	(Russia) Valeria Sorokina / Nina Vislova	(Japan) Mizuki Fujii / Reika Kakiiwa	21–19, 21–19
Mixed doubles	(Russia) Alexander Nikolaenko / Valeria Sorokina	(Japan) Shintaro Ikeda / Reiko Shiota	22–20, 21–9

Korea Grand Prix

- November 23–28, Gimcheon City Indoor Stadium, Gimcheon, South Korea.

Category	Winners	Runners-up	Score
Men's singles	(China) Bao Chunlai	(China) Wang Zhengming	23–21, 21–18
Women's singles	(China) Liu Xin	(China) Li Xuerui	21–9, 21–14
Men's doubles	(South Korea) Jung Jae-sung / Lee Yong-dae	(South Korea) Ko Sung-hyun / Yoo Yeon-seong	18–21, 21–18, 27–25
Women's doubles	(South Korea) Jung Kyung-eun / Yoo Hyun-young	(South Korea) Eom Hye-won / Kim Ha-na	21–16, 18–21, 21–19
Mixed doubles	(South Korea) Yoo Yeon-seong / Kim Min-jung	(South Korea) Choi Young-woo / Eom Hye-won	21–15, 21–13

India Open Grand Prix

- December 14–19, KVBR Indoor Stadium, Hyderabad, India.

Category	Winners	Runners-up	Score
Men's singles	(Indonesia) Dionysius Hayom Rumbaka	(Thailand) Suppanyu Avihingsanon	14–21, 21–15, 21–12
Women's singles	(China) Zhou Hui	(Indonesia) Fransisca Ratnasari	21–13, 21–17
Men's doubles	(Indonesia) Mohammad Ahsan / Bona Septano	(Malaysia) Gan Teik Chai / Tan Bin Shen	19–21, 21–15, 21–14
Women's doubles	(China) Tang Jinhua / Xia Huan	(Malaysia) Ng Hui Ern / Ng Hui Lin	21–8, 21–19
Mixed doubles	(China) Liu Peixuan / Tang Jinhua	(Malaysia) Gan Teik Chai / Ng Hui Lin	21–17, 21–17
