= Mohd Lutfi Zaim Abdul Khalid =

Malaysian badminton player (born 1989)

Personal information
- Born: 3 October 1989 (age 37) Pahang, Malaysia
- Height: 1.75 m (5 ft 9 in)
- Weight: 60 kg (132 lb)

Sport
- Country: Malaysia
- Sport: Badminton

Men's doubles
- Highest ranking: 43 (21 June 2012)
- BWF profile
Medal record
Men's badminton
Representing Malaysia
Southeast Asian Games
Silver medal – second place	2011 Jakarta	Men's team
Asian Junior Championships
Gold medal – first place	2007 Kuala Lumpur	Mixed team
Silver medal – second place	2007 Kuala Lumpur	Boys' doubles
Silver medal – second place	2006 Kuala Lumpur	Mixed team
Bronze medal – third place	2006 Kuala Lumpur	Boys' doubles

Mohd Lutfi Zaim Abdul Khalid (born 3 October 1989) is a Malaysian badminton player. In 2007, he reached the final round of the Asian Junior Championships in the boys' doubles event and won the silver medal after being defeated by the Chinese pair. In 2008, he won the mixed doubles title at the Malaysia International tournament partnered with Lim Yin Loo. In 2013, he competed at the Summer Universiade in Kazan, Russia. He is currently the Malaysian national junior under-18 boys' doubles coach.

== Achievements ==
=== Asian Junior Championships ===
Boys' doubles
Year	Venue	Partner	Opponent	Score	Result
2006	Kuala Lumpur Badminton Stadium; Kuala Lumpur, Malaysia	(Malaysia) Tan Wee Kiong	(Malaysia) Mohamad Arif Abdul Latif (Malaysia) Vountus Indra Mawan		Bronze
2007	Stadium Juara; Kuala Lumpur, Malaysia	(Malaysia) Tan Wee Kiong	(China) Chai Biao (China) Li Tian	12–21, 8–21	Silver

=== BWF International Challenge/Series ===
Men's doubles
Year	Tournament	Partner	Opponent	Score	Result
2013	Finnish Open	(Malaysia) Tan Wee Gieen	(Malaysia) Nelson Heg (Malaysia) Teo Ee Yi	14–21, 12–21	(silver) Runner-up

Mixed doubles
Year	Tournament	Partner	Opponent	Score	Result
2008	Malaysia International	(Malaysia) Lim Yin Loo	(Singapore) Danny Bawa Chrisnanta (Singapore) Vanessa Neo	14–21, 21–17, 21–19	(gold) Winner

BWF International Challenge tournament
BWF International Series tournament
