= Tan Wee Kiong =

Malaysian badminton player

Tan Wee Kiong 陈蔚强
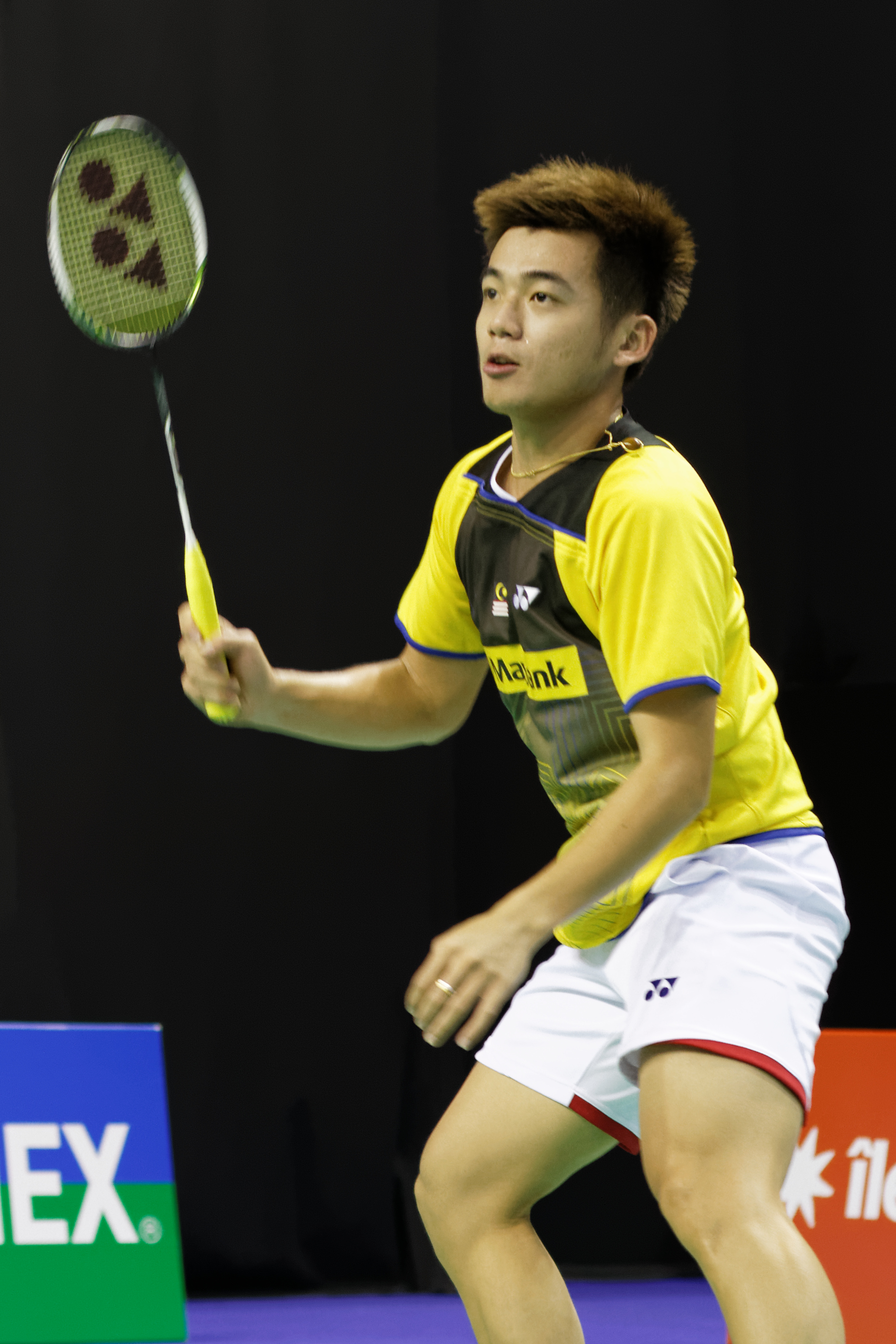
- Tan at the 2013 French Super Series

Personal information
- Born: 陳煒強; 21 May 1989 (age 37) Muar, Johor, Malaysia
- Height: 1.76 m (5 ft 9 in)
- Weight: 70 kg (154 lb)

Sport
- Country: Malaysia
- Sport: Badminton
- Handedness: Right
- Coached by: Cheah Soon Kit

Men's doubles
- Highest ranking: 1 (with Goh V Shem, 7 November 2016)
- Current ranking: 29 (with Nur Mohd Azriyn Ayub, 10 November 2026)
- BWF profile
Medal record
Men's badminton
Representing Malaysia
Olympic Games
Silver medal – second place	2016 Rio de Janeiro	Men's doubles
Thomas Cup
Silver medal – second place	2014 New Delhi	Men's team
Bronze medal – third place	2016 Kunshan	Men's team
Commonwealth Games
Gold medal – first place	2014 Glasgow	Men's doubles
Gold medal – first place	2014 Glasgow	Mixed team
Silver medal – second place	2018 Gold Coast	Mixed team
Bronze medal – third place	2018 Gold Coast	Men's doubles
Asian Games
Bronze medal – third place	2014 Incheon	Men's doubles
Bronze medal – third place	2014 Incheon	Men's team
Asia Team Championships
Bronze medal – third place	2018 Alor Setar	Men's team
SEA Games
Bronze medal – third place	2007 Nakhon Ratchasima	Men's team
Bronze medal – third place	2015 Singapore	Men's team
World Junior Championships
Bronze medal – third place	2006 Incheon	Mixed team
Asian Junior Championships
Gold medal – first place	2007 Kuala Lumpur	Mixed doubles
Gold medal – first place	2007 Kuala Lumpur	Mixed team
Silver medal – second place	2006 Kuala Lumpur	Mixed doubles
Silver medal – second place	2006 Kuala Lumpur	Mixed team
Silver medal – second place	2007 Kuala Lumpur	Boys' doubles
Bronze medal – third place	2006 Kuala Lumpur	Boys' doubles

Tan Wee Kiong
- Simplified Chinese: 陈蔚强
- Traditional Chinese: 陳蔚強
Transcriptions
Standard Mandarin
- Hanyu Pinyin: Chén Wèiqiáng

Birth name
- Simplified Chinese: 陈炜强
- Traditional Chinese: 陳煒強
Transcriptions
Standard Mandarin
- Hanyu Pinyin: Chén Wěiqiáng
Southern Min
- Hokkien POJ: Tân Ùi-kiông

Tan Wee Kiong (simplified Chinese: 陈蔚强; traditional Chinese: 陳蔚強; pinyin: Chén Wèiqiáng, born 21 May 1989) is a Malaysian badminton player. An Olympic silver medalist, two-time Commonwealth Games gold medalist, two-time Asian Games bronze medalist and former world number one, he and his former partner Goh V Shem won the men's doubles silver medal at the 2016 Summer Olympics in Rio de Janeiro, Brazil. They are the first and only Malaysian athletes in Olympic history to have held not just one, but two gold medal points, at 20–19 and 21–20 in the deciding game of the badminton men's doubles final at the 2016 Rio Olympics, placing them just one point away from winning the nation's first Olympic gold medal and making them the Malaysian athletes who have come closest to achieving the historic feat of becoming the first ever Olympic gold medalists of Malaysia, even closer than the legendary three-time Olympic silver medalist Lee Chong Wei, who won three Olympic silver medals but never reached a gold medal point. They also became the first Malaysian men's doubles pair to reach an Olympic final since Cheah Soon Kit and Yap Kim Hock in 1996. Together, Tan and Goh reached the world number one ranking on 7 November 2016, becoming the fifth Malaysian men's doubles pair to achieve the ranking.

Tan won two gold medals at the 2014 Commonwealth Games, securing the men's doubles title with Goh and contributing to Malaysia's victory in the mixed team event. He also won bronze medals in men's doubles and the men's team event at the 2014 Asian Games. At the 2018 Commonwealth Games, he added a mixed team silver medal and a men's doubles bronze medal. In team competitions, Tan helped Malaysia win silver at the 2014 Thomas Cup and bronze at the 2016 Thomas Cup, as well as a men's team bronze medal at the 2018 Badminton Asia Team Championships.

Together with Goh, Tan won the 2016 Denmark Open, their first BWF Superseries title, and the 2016 Dubai World Superseries Finals, defeating Japan's Takeshi Kamura and Keigo Sonoda in the final. They also won the 2015 U.S. Open, 2016 Syed Modi International, 2019 Thailand Masters and 2019 Taipei Open, and finished runners-up at the 2020 Thailand Open, a BWF World Tour Super 1000 tournament.

During his junior career, Tan won two gold medals at the 2007 Badminton Asia Junior Championships, in mixed doubles with Woon Khe Wei and in the mixed team competition. He also won silver medals in boys' doubles and mixed doubles at the Asian Junior Championships. After his partnership with Goh ended in 2021, Tan competed with several other partners, including Tan Kian Meng and Nur Mohd Azriyn Ayub. With Azriyn, he reached a highest world ranking of number 23 on 11 March 2025.

== Early and personal life ==
Tan was born on 21 May 1989 in Johor to Tan Cham Swe and Tan Yok Hua. His brothers, Tan Wee Tat and Tan Wee Gieen, are also professional badminton players. Tan started playing badminton when he was 6 and joined Bukit Jalil Sport School when he was 13. Tan and beautician Chia Shi Leng wed in 2016. Due to Tan's tight schedule, their wedding reception was held in December 2017 at The St. Regis Hotel Kuala Lumpur, with 700 guests in attendance. The couple had a son in March 2019.

== Career ==
=== Early career ===
Tan started his junior career as a mixed doubles player. However, he later transitioned into men's doubles. In 2007, he won the Asian Junior Championships mixed doubles gold medal with Woon Khe Wei. They were seeded second and first at the 2006 and 2007 World Junior Championships but were defeated in the fourth round on both occasions.

=== 2010–2014 ===
In 2010, he briefly partnered Mak Hee Chun. They played together at the 2010 Asian Games but were beaten in the round of 32. Later, he partnered Hoon Thien How. They reached a career high of no. 7 worldwide. Their campaign at the 2013 World Championships ended in the third round after a loss to Cai Yun and Fu Haifeng. Later that year, the pair reached their first ever Super Series semifinal at the French Open. Shortly after, the two won their first career title at the Macau Open. They were runners-up at the China Open and in that same year, they qualified for the Super Series Finals after the withdrawal of compatriots, Koo Kien Keat and Tan Boon Heong. However, they failed to advance past the group stage.

Tan played his last tournament with Hoon at the 2014 World Championships in August 2014. Their campaign ended in the quarterfinals where they lost to the eventual champions, Ko Sung-hyun and Shin Baek-cheol.

=== 2014–2021 ===
In May 2014, Tan was scratch partnered with Goh V Shem to play second men's doubles at the 2014 Thomas Cup. They won all four matches that they contested and defeated several highly ranked players along the way despite this being the first time ever that the two has played together internationally. Their debut partnership at the Thomas Cup was widely praised. Malaysia made it to the finals for the first time in 12 years but was narrowly defeated by Japan with a score of 2–3.

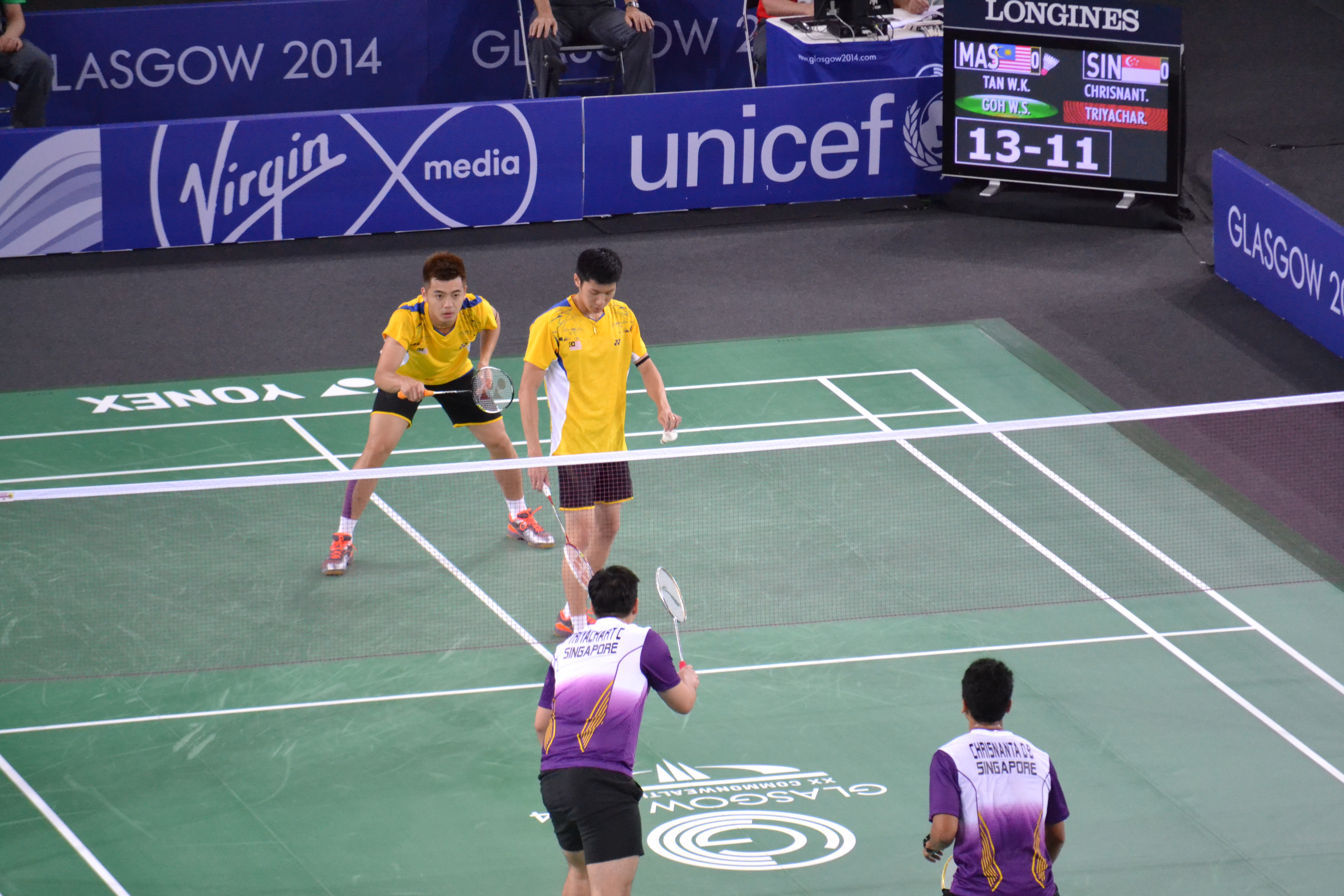
Tan and Goh at the 2014 Commonwealth Games men's doubles final

In August, Tan represented Malaysia at the 2014 Commonwealth Games in Glasgow with Goh V Shem. They went on to take the gold medal and were the only medalists in the tournament who were not seeded. En route to the gold medal, they defeated top seeds, Chris Adcock and Andrew Ellis of England in the semifinals as well as 3rd seeds, Danny Bawa Chrisnanta and Chayut Triyachart of Singapore in the finals. They also won all five matches they contested in the mixed team event, helping Malaysia secure their third consecutive mixed team gold medal at the Commonwealth Games.

Following the World Championships in September, Tan and Goh have been officially partnered. They represented Malaysia at the 2014 Asian Games where they made it to semifinals but were defeated by top seeds, Lee Yong-dae and Yoo Yeon-seong of South Korea. The defeat automatically earned them the bronze medal as there is no bronze medal playoffs in badminton at the Asian Games. En route to the semifinals, they defeated 5th seeds, Lee Sheng-mu and Tsai Chia-hsin of Chinese Taipei in the round of 32 and 3rd seeds, Hiroyuki Endo and Kenichi Hayakawa of Japan in the quarterfinals with a score of 21–16, 21–16.

They were semifinalists at the Malaysia Masters in January that year. In March, they became runners-up to Cai Yun and Lu Kai at the Swiss Open. At the 2015 Sudirman Cup in May, Goh and Tan managed to upset the World No. 1, Lee Yong-dae and Yoo Yeon-seong in the first group tie against South Korea. Malaysia topped Group D and were drawn against South Korea once again in the quarterfinals but failed to advance. At the 2015 World Championships in August, Tan and Goh defeated defending champions Ko Sung-hyun and Shin Baek-cheol in the second round but were defeated in the third round. Tan and Goh won their first title together at the 2015 U.S. Grand Prix. They then went on to win their second title at the 2016 Syed Modi International Grand Prix Gold. They then became beaten semifinalists at the All England Open and the Indian Super Series. At the 2016 Thomas Cup, Tan won three out of his five matches played. Malaysia made it to the semifinals but lost to eventual winners Denmark.

Tan and Goh made their Olympics debut at the 2016 Summer Olympics. They won all their matches in the group stage to top group B and qualify for the quarter-finals. In the quarter-finals, they stun Lee Yong-dae and Yoo Yeon-seong to reach the semi-finals. Tan and Goh later beat Chai Biao and Hong Wei in the semifinals. They once again face Fu Haifeng and Zhang Nan in the finals but this time falling short with a score of 21–16, 11–21, 21–23, taking home silver.

In October 2016, Tan won his first Super Series tournament title with Goh at the 2016 Denmark Open. In November, they became the new world number 1 in men's doubles. In December, Tan and Goh won the 2016 Dubai World Superseries Finals.

He briefly partnered with Ong Yew Sin before resuming his partnership with Goh in early 2018.

His partnership was resumed with Goh V Shem in order to help Malaysia in 2018 Thomas Cup. In the group stage, they defeated Vladimir Ivanov and Ivan Sozonov from Russia. They were defeated by Denmark and Kevin Sanjaya Sukamuljo and Marcus Fernaldi Gideon of Indonesia by three sets 19–21, 22–20 and 13–21.

=== 2021–present ===
In August 2021, Tan ended his partnership with Goh V Shem and sought Tan Kian Meng as his new partner. His first tournament with Kian Meng was the 2021 Dutch Open where they made it to the finals and lost by three sets 14–21, 21–18, 20–22 to Terry Hee and Loh Kean Hean from Singapore.

== Achievements ==
=== Olympic Games ===
Men's doubles
Year	Venue	Partner	Opponent	Score	Result
2016	Riocentro - Pavilion 4, Rio de Janeiro, Brazil	(Malaysia) Goh V Shem	(China) Fu Haifeng (China) Zhang Nan	21–16, 11–21, 21–23	Silver

=== Commonwealth Games ===
Men's doubles
Year	Venue	Partner	Opponent	Score	Result
2014	Emirates Arena; Glasgow, Scotland	(Malaysia) Goh V Shem	(Singapore) Danny Bawa Chrisnanta (Singapore) Chayut Triyachart	21–12, 12–21, 21–15	Gold
2018	Carrara Sports and Leisure Centre; Gold Coast, Australia	(Malaysia) Goh V Shem	(Sri Lanka) Sachin Dias (Sri Lanka) Buwaneka Goonethilleka	21–8, 21–13	Bronze

=== Asian Games ===
Men's doubles
Year	Venue	Partner	Opponent	Score	Result
2014	Gyeyang Gymnasium; Incheon, South Korea	(Malaysia) Goh V Shem	(South Korea) Lee Yong-dae (South Korea) Yoo Yeon-seong	6–21, 15–21	Bronze

=== Asian Junior Championships ===
Boys' doubles
Year	Venue	Partner	Opponent	Score	Result
2006	Kuala Lumpur Badminton Stadium; Kuala Lumpur, Malaysia	(Malaysia) Mohd Lutfi Zaim	(Malaysia) Mohamad Arif Abdul Latif (Malaysia) Vountus Indra Mawan		Bronze
2007	Stadium Juara; Kuala Lumpur, Malaysia	(Malaysia) Mohd Lutfi Zaim	(China) Chai Biao (China) Li Tian	12–21, 8–21	Silver

Mixed doubles
Year	Venue	Partner	Opponent	Score	Result
2006	Kuala Lumpur Badminton Stadium; Kuala Lumpur, Malaysia	(Malaysia) Woon Khe Wei	(South Korea) Lee Yong-dae (South Korea) Yoo Hyun-young	15–21, 9–21	Silver
2007	Stadium Juara; Kuala Lumpur, Malaysia	(Malaysia) Woon Khe Wei	(South Korea) Shin Baek-cheol (South Korea) Yoo Hyun-young	21–18, 16–21, 21–12	Gold

=== BWF World Tour (2 titles, 3 runners-up) ===
The BWF World Tour, which was announced on 19 March 2017 and implemented in 2018, is a series of elite badminton tournaments sanctioned by the Badminton World Federation (BWF). The BWF World Tours are divided into levels of World Tour Finals, Super 1000, Super 750, Super 500, Super 300 (part of the HSBC World Tour), and the BWF Tour Super 100.

Men's doubles
Year	Tournament	Level	Partner	Opponent	Score	Result
2018	Malaysia Masters	Super 500	(Malaysia) Goh V Shem	(Indonesia) Fajar Alfian (Indonesia) Muhammad Rian Ardianto	21–14, 22–24, 13–21	(silver) Runner-up
2019	Thailand Masters	Super 300	(Malaysia) Goh V Shem	(Chinese Taipei) Lu Ching-yao (Chinese Taipei) Yang Po-han	21–13, 21–17	(gold) Winner
2019	Chinese Taipei Open	Super 300	(Malaysia) Goh V Shem	(South Korea) Choi Sol-gyu (South Korea) Seo Seung-jae	21–19, 15–21, 23–21	(gold) Winner
2019	Korea Masters	Super 300	(Malaysia) Goh V Shem	(Chinese Taipei) Lee Yang (Chinese Taipei) Wang Chi-lin	19–21, 22–20, 19–21	(silver) Runner-up
2020 (I)	Thailand Open	Super 1000	(Malaysia) Goh V Shem	(Chinese Taipei) Lee Yang (Chinese Taipei) Wang Chi-lin	16–21, 23–21, 19–21	(silver) Runner-up

=== BWF Superseries (2 titles, 1 runner-up) ===
The BWF Superseries, which was launched on 14 December 2006 and implemented in 2007, was a series of elite badminton tournaments, sanctioned by the Badminton World Federation (BWF). BWF Superseries levels were Superseries and Superseries Premier. A season of Superseries consisted of twelve tournaments around the world that had been introduced since 2011. Successful players were invited to the Superseries Finals, which were held at the end of each year.

Men's doubles
Year	Tournament	Partner	Opponent	Score	Result
2013	China Open	(Malaysia) Hoon Thien How	(South Korea) Lee Yong-dae (South Korea) Yoo Yeon-seong	13–21, 12–21	(silver) Runner-up
2016	Denmark Open	(Malaysia) Goh V Shem	(Thailand) Bodin Isara (Thailand) Nipitphon Puangpuapech	14–21, 22–20, 21–19	(gold) Winner
2016	Dubai World Superseries Finals	(Malaysia) Goh V Shem	(Japan) Takeshi Kamura (Japan) Keigo Sonoda	21–14, 21–19	(gold) Winner

BWF Super Series Finals tournament
BWF Super Series Premier tournament
BWF Super Series tournament

=== BWF Grand Prix (3 titles, 2 runners-up) ===
The BWF Grand Prix had two levels, the Grand Prix and Grand Prix Gold. It was a series of badminton tournaments sanctioned by the Badminton World Federation (BWF) and played between 2007 and 2017.

Men's doubles
Year	Tournament	Partner	Opponent	Score	Result
2013	Macau Open	(Malaysia) Hoon Thien How	(Chinese Taipei) Lee Sheng-mu (Chinese Taipei) Tsai Chia-hsin	21–16, 21–19	(gold) Winner
2015	Swiss Open	(Malaysia) Goh V Shem	(China) Cai Yun (China) Lu Kai	19–21, 21–14, 17–21	(silver) Runner-up
2015	Russian Open	(Malaysia) Goh V Shem	(Russia) Vladimir Ivanov (Russia) Ivan Sozonov	20–22, 19–21	(silver) Runner-up
2015	U.S. Grand Prix	(Malaysia) Goh V Shem	(Russia) Vladimir Ivanov (Russia) Ivan Sozonov	21–14, 21–17	(gold) Winner
2016	Syed Modi International	(Malaysia) Goh V Shem	(India) Pranav Chopra (India) Akshay Dewalkar	14–21, 24–22, 21–8	(gold) Winner

BWF Grand Prix Gold tournament
BWF Grand Prix tournament

=== BWF International Challenge/Series (1 title, 3 runners-up) ===
Men's doubles
Year	Tournament	Partner	Opponent	Score	Result
2011	Indonesia International	(Malaysia) Ow Yao Han	(Indonesia) Rian Sukmawan (Indonesia) Rendra Wijaya	13–21, 21–19, 16–21	(silver) Runner-up
2021	Dutch Open	(Malaysia) Tan Kian Meng	(Singapore) Terry Hee (Singapore) Loh Kean Hean	14–21, 21–18, 20–22	(silver) Runner-up

Mixed doubles
Year	Tournament	Partner	Opponent	Score	Result
2007	Malaysia International	(Malaysia) Woon Khe Wei	(Malaysia) Lim Khim Wah (Malaysia) Ng Hui Lin	15–21, 14–21	(silver) Runner-up
2009	Malaysia International	(Malaysia) Woon Khe Wei	(Malaysia) Mak Hee Chun (Malaysia) Ng Hui Lin	21–6, 13–21, 21–17	(gold) Winner

BWF International Challenge tournament
BWF International Series tournament

== Honours ==
- Member of the Order of the Defender of the Realm (A.M.N.) (2017).
