= Rosaria Yusfin Pungkasari =

Indonesian badminton player (born 1987)

Personal information
- Born: 22 July 1987 (age 39) Temanggung, Central Java, Indonesia

Sport
- Country: Indonesia
- Sport: Badminton
- Event: Women's singles

Women's singles
- BWF profile
Medal record
Women's badminton
Representing Indonesia
Asian Junior Championships
Bronze medal – third place	2005 Jakarta	Girls' team

Rosaria Yusfin Pungkasari (born 22 July 1987) is an Indonesian badminton player affiliated with Djarum club. She was part of the Indonesian junior team that played at the 2005 Asian Junior Championships, clinched the girls' team bronze medal after defeated by the Chinese team in the semifinal. Pungkasari has collected four Sircuit National titles from 2007 to 2012, and at the National Championships, she once a semifinalist in 2011. Pungkasari was the runner-up in Grand Prix tournament at the 2008 Bulgaria Open defeated by Petya Nedelcheva in the final. She won her first international title at the 2010 Indonesia International Challenge tournament.

== Achievements ==
=== BWF Grand Prix ===
The BWF Grand Prix had two levels, the Grand Prix and Grand Prix Gold. It was a series of badminton tournaments sanctioned by the Badminton World Federation (BWF) and played between 2007 and 2017.

Women's singles
Year	Tournament	Opponent	Score	Result
2008	Bulgaria Open	(Bulgaria) Petya Nedelcheva	14–21, 12–21	(silver) Runner-up

BWF Grand Prix Gold tournament
BWF Grand Prix tournament

=== BWF International Challenge/Series ===
Women's singles
Year	Tournament	Opponent	Score	Result
2007	Banuinvest International	(England) Tracey Hallam	14–21, 14–21	(silver) Runner-up
2008	Indonesia International	(South Korea) Bae Yeon-ju	18–21, 21–23	(silver) Runner-up
2009	Auckland International	(Indonesia) Febby Angguni	15–21, 16–21	(silver) Runner-up
2010	Indonesia International	(Indonesia) Bellaetrix Manuputty	22–24, 21–15, 21–18	(gold) Winner

BWF International Challenge tournament
BWF Future Series tournament
