= Indra Viki Okvana =

Indonesian badminton player (born 1988)

Viki Indra Okvana
Personal information
- Born: 21 October 1988 (age 38) Trenggalek, East Java, Indonesia
- Height: 1.80 m (5 ft 11 in)
- Weight: 67 kg (148 lb)

Sport
- Country: Indonesia
- Sport: Badminton
- Coached by: Tri Kusharjanto; Richard Mainaky

Men's & mixed doubles
- Highest ranking: 43
- BWF profile
Medal record
Men's badminton
Representing Indonesia
Summer Universiade
Bronze medal – third place	2007 Bangkok	Mixed team
Asian Junior Championships
Bronze medal – third place	2006 Kuala Lumpur	Mixed team
Bronze medal – third place	2005 Jakarta	Boys' doubles
Bronze medal – third place	2005 Jakarta	Boys' team

Viki Indra Okvana (born 21 October 1988) is an Indonesian badminton player from Suryanaga Mutiara Timur club. He also played for the Deltacar Benátky nad Jizerou club in Czech Republic. He was the bronze medallists at the 2005 Asian Junior Championships in the boys' doubles and team event. Okvana was selected to join the Indonesia national team in 2006. He won the mixed doubles title at the 2007 Dutch Junior International tournament partnered with Richi Puspita Dili. Okvana who educated at the STIE Perbanas Jakarta competed at the 2007 Summer Universiade in Bangkok, winning a bronze medal in the mixed team event. Partnered with Gustiani Megawati, they won the mixed doubles title at the Czech, Turkey, Bahrain and Hungarian International tournaments. He also won the men's doubles title at the Austrian International with Ardiansyah Putra, and Hungarian International with Albert Saputra.

== Achievements ==
=== Asian Junior Championships ===
Boys' doubles
Year	Venue	Partner	Opponent	Score	Result
2005	Tennis Indoor Senayan; Jakarta, Indonesia	(Indonesia) Mohammad Ahsan	(South Korea) Cho Gun-woo (South Korea) Lee Yong-dae	8–15, 2–15	Bronze

=== BWF International Challenge/Series ===
Men's doubles
Year	Tournament	Partner	Opponent	Score	Result
2013	Hungarian International	(Indonesia) Albert Saputra	(Denmark) Frederik Colberg (Denmark) Mikkel Mikkelsen	21–16, 23–21	(gold) Winner
2010	Austrian International	(Indonesia) Ardiansyah Putra	(England) Andrew Ellis (England) Dean George	21–17, 21–23, 28–26	(gold) Winner

Mixed doubles
Year	Tournament	Partner	Opponent	Score	Result
2013	Hungarian International	(Indonesia) Gustiani Megawati	(Netherlands) Robin Tabeling (Netherlands) Myke Halkema	17–21, 17–21	(silver) Runner-up
2011	Hungarian International	(Indonesia) Gustiani Megawati	(Poland) Lukasz Moren (Poland) Natalia Pocztowiak	21–11, 21–19	(gold) Winner
2010	Bahrain International	(Indonesia) Gustiani Megawati	(Poland) Wojciech Szkudlarczyk (Poland) Agnieszka Wojtkowska	17–21, 21–16, 21–14	(gold) Winner
2009	Turkiye International	(Indonesia) Gustiani Megawati	(Denmark) Tore Villhelmsen (Denmark) Sara Thygesen	21–11, 21–18	(gold) Winner
2009	Czech International	(Indonesia) Gustiani Megawati	(Denmark) Mads Conrad-Petersen (Denmark) Anne Skelbaek	21–11, 21–13	(gold) Winner
2008	Smiling Fish International	(Indonesia) Natalia Christine Poluakan	(Indonesia) Lingga Lie (Indonesia) Keshya Nurvita Hanadia	16–21, 21–13, 16–21	(silver) Runner-up

BWF International Challenge tournament
BWF International Series tournament

=== BWF Junior International (1 title) ===
Mixed doubles
Year	Tournament	Partner	Opponent	Score	Result	Ref.
2007	Dutch Junior	(Indonesia) Richi Puspita Dili	(Indonesia) Wifqi Windarto (Indonesia) Debby Susanto	21–14, 21–18	(gold) Winner	

BWF Junior International Grand Prix tournament
BWF Junior International Challenge tournament
BWF Junior International Series tournament
BWF Junior Future Series tournament
