= Kang Hae-won =

South Korean badminton player (born 1986)

Personal information
- Born: 19 March 1986 (age 40) Jeju, South Korea
- Height: 1.70 m (5 ft 7 in)

Sport
- Country: South Korea
- Sport: Badminton
- Handedness: Right
- Event: Women's singles & doubles

Women's singles & doubles
- BWF profile
Medal record
Women's badminton
Representing South Korea
East Asian Games
Bronze medal – third place	2009 Hong Kong	Women's team
Asian Junior Championships
Silver medal – second place	2004 Hwacheon	Girls' team
Bronze medal – third place	2004 Hwacheon	Mixed doubles

Kang Hae-won (Korean: 강해원; born 19 March 1986) is a South Korean badminton player who affiliated with the Samsung Electro-Mechanics team since 2009. She won the bronze medal at the 2004 Asian Junior Championships in the mixed doubles event partnered with Lee Yong-dae, also claimed the silver medal in the girls' team event. Born in Jeju, Kang educated at the Incheon National University, won the 2008 National University Championships in the women's singles and doubles event. At the 55th National Summer Championships in 2012, she claimed triple titles by winning the women's singles, doubles, and team event. Kang was part of the national women's team that won the bronze medal at the 2009 East Asian Games in Hong Kong.

== Achievements ==
=== Asian Junior Championships ===
Mixed doubles
Year	Venue	Partner	Opponent	Score	Result
2004	Hwacheon Indoor Stadium, Hwacheon, South Korea	(South Korea) Lee Yong-dae	(China) Shen Ye (China) Feng Chen	7–15, 6–15	Bronze

=== BWF Grand Prix ===
The BWF Grand Prix had two levels, the BWF Grand Prix and Grand Prix Gold. It was a series of badminton tournaments sanctioned by the Badminton World Federation (BWF) which was held from 2007 to 2017.

Women's doubles
Year	Tournament	Partner	Opponent	Score	Result
2010	Australian Open	(South Korea) Seo Yoon-hee	(South Korea) Kim Min-seo (South Korea) Lee Kyung-won	17–21, 17–21	(silver) Runner-up

BWF Grand Prix Gold tournament
BWF Grand Prix tournament

=== IBF International ===
Women's doubles
Year	Tournament	Partner	Opponent	Score	Result
2005	Vietnam Satellite	(South Korea) Kim Min-jung	(South Korea) Ha Jung-eun (South Korea) Oh Seul-ki	6–15, 15–7, 5–15	(silver) Runner-up
