= Badminton at the 2007 Summer Universiade =

Badminton contested at the 2007 Summer Universiade from August 7 to August 9 at the Thammasat University in Pathum Thani, Thailand. Men's and women's singles, men's, women's, and mixed doubles, and mixed team events was contested.

== Medal summary ==
=== Medal table ===
* Host nation (Thailand)

Rank	Nation	Gold	Silver	Bronze	Total
1	Thailand*	3	0	5	8
2	China	1	3	4	8
3	Chinese Taipei	1	3	2	6
4	South Korea	1	0	0	1
5	Indonesia	0	0	1	1
Totals (5 entries)		6	6	12	24

=== Events ===
Event	Gold	Silver	Bronze
Men's singles	Boonsak Ponsana; Thailand	Chen Hong; China	Liao Sheng-shiun; Chinese Taipei
Men's singles	Boonsak Ponsana; Thailand	Chen Hong; China	Poompat Sapkulchannart; Thailand
Women's singles	Wang Yihan; China	Cheng Shao-chieh; Chinese Taipei	Moltijla Meemeak; Thailand
Women's singles	Wang Yihan; China	Cheng Shao-chieh; Chinese Taipei	Wang Lin; China
Men's doubles	Thailand; Sudket Prapakamol; Phattapol Ngensrisuk	Chinese Taipei; Tsai Chia-hsin; Hsieh Yu-hsing	China; Shen Ye; Zhang Wei
Men's doubles	Thailand; Sudket Prapakamol; Phattapol Ngensrisuk	Chinese Taipei; Tsai Chia-hsin; Hsieh Yu-hsing	Thailand; Songphon Anugritayawon; Nuttaphon Narkhtong
Women's doubles	Chinese Taipei; Cheng Wen-hsing; Chien Yu-chin	China; Pan Pan; Tian Qing	China; Zhang Dan; Wang Lin
Women's doubles	Chinese Taipei; Cheng Wen-hsing; Chien Yu-chin	China; Pan Pan; Tian Qing	Thailand; Duanganong Aroonkesorn; Kunchala Voravichitchaikul
Mixed doubles	South Korea; Kim Min-Jung; Yoo Yeon-Seong	Chinese Taipei; Cheng Wen-hsing; Fang Chieh-min	China; Zhang Dan; Chen Hong
Mixed doubles	South Korea; Kim Min-Jung; Yoo Yeon-Seong	Chinese Taipei; Cheng Wen-hsing; Fang Chieh-min	Thailand; Salakjit Ponsana; Sudket Prapakamol
Mixed team	Thailand; Salakjit Ponsana; Soratja Chansrisukot; Molthila Meemeak; Duanganong Aroonkesorn; Kunchala Voravichitchaikul; Savitree Amitapai; Boonsak Ponsana; Poompat Sapkulchananart; Sudket Prapakamol; Patapol Ngernsrisuk; Nuttaphon Narkthong; Songphon Anugritayawon	China; Tian Qing; Zhang Dan; Pan Pan; Wang Lin; Wang Yihan; Gong Weijie; Shen Ye; Xu Chen; Chen Hong; Zhang Wei; Xie Xin	Indonesia; Richi Puspita Dili; Nitya Krishinda Maheswari; Nadya Melati; Fransisca Ratnasari; Tommy Sugiarto; Alamsyah Yunus; Bona Septano; Mohammad Ahsan; Tontowi Ahmad; Viki Indra Okvana; Pia Zebadiah Bernadet
Mixed team	Thailand; Salakjit Ponsana; Soratja Chansrisukot; Molthila Meemeak; Duanganong Aroonkesorn; Kunchala Voravichitchaikul; Savitree Amitapai; Boonsak Ponsana; Poompat Sapkulchananart; Sudket Prapakamol; Patapol Ngernsrisuk; Nuttaphon Narkthong; Songphon Anugritayawon	China; Tian Qing; Zhang Dan; Pan Pan; Wang Lin; Wang Yihan; Gong Weijie; Shen Ye; Xu Chen; Chen Hong; Zhang Wei; Xie Xin	Chinese Taipei; Pai Min-jie; Cheng Wen-hsing; Yang Chia-chen; Tsai Pei-ling; Chien Yu-chin; Cheng Shao-chieh; Tsai Chia-hsin; Chu Han-chou; Fang Chieh-min; Liao Sheng-shiun; Lee Sheng-mu; Hsieh Yu-hsing
