= Vountus Indra Mawan =

Malaysian badminton player (born 1989)

Personal information
- Born: 22 March 1989 (age 37) Sabah, Malaysia
- Height: 1.74 m (5 ft 9 in)

Sport
- Country: Malaysia
- Sport: Badminton
- Handedness: Right

Men's doubles
- Highest ranking: 43 (21 June 2012)
- BWF profile
Medal record
Men's badminton
Representing Malaysia
Summer Universiade
Bronze medal – third place	2015 Gwangju	Mixed team
World Junior Championships
Bronze medal – third place	2006 Incheon	Mixed team
Asian Junior Championships
Gold medal – first place	2007 Kuala Lumpur	Mixed team
Silver medal – second place	2006 Kuala Lumpur	Boys' doubles
Silver medal – second place	2006 Kuala Lumpur	Mixed team
Bronze medal – third place	2005 Jakarta	Boys' team
Bronze medal – third place	2007 Kuala Lumpur	Boys' doubles

Vountus Indra Mawan (born 22 March 1989) is a former Malaysian badminton player. In 2007, he reached the semi-final round of the Asian Junior Championships in the boys' doubles event partnered with Mohamad Arif Abdul Latif and settled for the bronze medal. He won his first senior title at the 2008 Iran Fajr International tournament in the men's doubles event. He is the head coach of Badminton Victoria and Australia national head coach’s assistant since February 2023.

== Achievements ==
=== Asian Junior Championships ===
Boys' doubles
Year	Venue	Partner	Opponent	Score	Result
2006	Kuala Lumpur Badminton Stadium; Kuala Lumpur, Malaysia	(Malaysia) Mohamad Arif Abdul Latif	(South Korea) Cho Gun-woo (South Korea) Lee Yong-dae	12–21, 9–21	Silver
2007	Stadium Juara; Kuala Lumpur, Malaysia	(Malaysia) Mohamad Arif Abdul Latif	(China) Chai Biao (China) Li Tian	20–22, 15–21	Bronze

=== BWF International Challenge/Series ===
Men's doubles
Year	Tournament	Partner	Opponent	Score	Result
2008	Iran Fajr International	(Malaysia) Mohamad Arif Abdul Latif	(Iran) Ali Shahhosseini (Iran) Nikzad Shiri	21–16, 14–21, 21–9	(gold) Winner
2015	Auckland International	(Malaysia) Darren Isaac Devadass	(Chinese Taipei) Po Li-wei (Chinese Taipei) Yang Ming-tse	21–7, 21–12	(gold) Winner
2015	Maribyrnong International	(Malaysia) Darren Isaac Devadass	(Australia) Matthew Chau (Australia) Sawan Serasinghe	22–24, 21–10, 21–14	(gold) Winner

Mixed doubles
Year	Tournament	Partner	Opponent	Score	Result
2014	Sri Lanka International	(India) Prajakta Sawant	(India) Akshay Dewalkar (India) Pradnya Gadre	16–21, 18–21	(silver) Runner-up

BWF International Challenge tournament
BWF International Series tournament
