= 2006 Asian Junior Badminton Championships =

Tournament details
- Dates: 3–9 July 2006
- Edition: 9
- Venue: Kuala Lumpur Badminton Stadium
- Location: Kuala Lumpur, Malaysia

The 2006 Asian Junior Badminton Championships were held at the Kuala Lumpur Badminton Stadium in Kuala Lumpur, Malaysia from 3–9 July. There were 24 countries competed in this championships.

== Medalists ==
Event	Gold	Silver	Bronze
Teams	South Korea; Cho Gun-woo; Choi Sang-won; Han Ki-hoon; Hong Ji-hoon; Kim Ki-jung; Lee Yong-dae; Lee Jung-hwan; Son Wan-ho; Bang Eun-hye; Chang Ye-na; Choi Ha-na; Jang Soo-young; Jung Kyung-eun; Kim Moon-hi; Sun In-jang; Yoo Hyun-young	Malaysia; Mohd Lutfi Zaim Abdul Khalid; Mohamad Arif Abdul Latif; Lim Khim Wah; Mak Hee Chun; Vountus Indra Mawan; Tan Wee Kiong; Teo Kok Siang; Lyddia Cheah; Goh Liu Ying; Ho Bee Ling; Vivian Hoo Kah Mun; Sannatasah Saniru; Woon Khe Wei	China; Chen Tianyu; Du Pengyu; Hu Wenqing; Li Tian; Liu Xiaolong; Lu Qicheng; Wen Kai; Zhang Yingdong; Cheng Wen; Han Li; Liao Jingmei; Liu Jie; Ma Jin; Wang Siyun; Wang Xiaoli; Wang Yihan
Teams	South Korea; Cho Gun-woo; Choi Sang-won; Han Ki-hoon; Hong Ji-hoon; Kim Ki-jung; Lee Yong-dae; Lee Jung-hwan; Son Wan-ho; Bang Eun-hye; Chang Ye-na; Choi Ha-na; Jang Soo-young; Jung Kyung-eun; Kim Moon-hi; Sun In-jang; Yoo Hyun-young	Malaysia; Mohd Lutfi Zaim Abdul Khalid; Mohamad Arif Abdul Latif; Lim Khim Wah; Mak Hee Chun; Vountus Indra Mawan; Tan Wee Kiong; Teo Kok Siang; Lyddia Cheah; Goh Liu Ying; Ho Bee Ling; Vivian Hoo Kah Mun; Sannatasah Saniru; Woon Khe Wei	Indonesia; Fernando Kurniawan; Bandar Sigit Pamungkas; Yoga Pratama; Wisnu Haryo Putro; Viki Indra Okvana; Subakti; Pia Zebadiah Bernadeth; Richi Puspita Dili; Keshya Nurvita Hanadia; Bellaetrix Manuputty; Lily Siswanti; Aprilia Yuswandari
Boys' singles	(Japan) Kenichi Tago	(South Korea) Han Ki-hoon	(Malaysia) Mohamad Arif Abdul Latif
Boys' singles	(Japan) Kenichi Tago	(South Korea) Han Ki-hoon	(China) Lu Qicheng
Girls' singles	(China) Wang Yihan	(Malaysia) Lydia Cheah	(China) Liu Jie
Girls' singles	(China) Wang Yihan	(Malaysia) Lydia Cheah	(China) Han Li
Boys' doubles	(South Korea) Cho Gun-woo (South Korea) Lee Yong-dae	(Malaysia) Mohamad Arif Abdul Latif (Malaysia) Vountus Indra Mawan	(Malaysia) Mohd Lutfi Zaim Abdul Khalid (Malaysia) Tan Wee Kiong
Boys' doubles	(South Korea) Cho Gun-woo (South Korea) Lee Yong-dae	(Malaysia) Mohamad Arif Abdul Latif (Malaysia) Vountus Indra Mawan	(Malaysia) Lim Khim Wah (Malaysia) Mak Hee Chun
Girls' doubles	(China) Ma Jin (China) Wang Xiaoli	(South Korea) Sun In-jang (South Korea) Yoo Hyun-young	(China) Liao Jingmei (China) Wang Siyun
Girls' doubles	(China) Ma Jin (China) Wang Xiaoli	(South Korea) Sun In-jang (South Korea) Yoo Hyun-young	(Japan) Mizuki Fujii (Japan) Yuriko Miki
Mixed doubles	(South Korea) Lee Yong-dae (South Korea) Yoo Hyun-young	(Malaysia) Tan Wee Kiong (Malaysia) Woon Khe Wei	(Indonesia) Subakti (Indonesia) Pia Zebadiah Bernadeth
Mixed doubles	(South Korea) Lee Yong-dae (South Korea) Yoo Hyun-young	(Malaysia) Tan Wee Kiong (Malaysia) Woon Khe Wei	(China) Liu Xiaolong (China) Liao Jingmei

== Medal table ==
Rank	Nation	Gold	Silver	Bronze	Total
1	South Korea (KOR)	3	2	0	5
2	China (CHN)	2	0	6	8
3	Japan (JPN)	1	0	1	2
4	Malaysia (MAS)	0	4	3	7
5	Indonesia (INA)	0	0	2	2
Totals (5 entries)		6	6	12	24
