= Seo Yoon-hee =

South Korean badminton player

Personal information
- Born: 10 November 1984 (age 42) Jeonju, Jeollabuk-do, South Korea
- Height: 1.64 m (5 ft 5 in)
- Weight: 56 kg (123 lb)

Sport
- Country: South Korea
- Sport: Badminton
- Handedness: Right
- Event: Women's singles

Women's singles
- BWF profile
Medal record
Women's badminton
Representing South Korea
Sudirman Cup
Bronze medal – third place	2005 Beijing	Mixed team
Uber Cup
Silver medal – second place	2004 Jakarta	Women's team
World Junior Championships
Silver medal – second place	2000 Guangzhou	Mixed team
Silver medal – second place	2002 Pretoria	Girls' singles
Silver medal – second place	2002 Pretoria	Mixed team
Asian Junior Championships
Gold medal – first place	2001 Taipei	Girls' team
Silver medal – second place	2000 Kyoto	Girls' team
Silver medal – second place	2001 Taipei	Girls' singles
Silver medal – second place	2002 Kuala Lumpur	Girls' team

- Seo Yoon-hee
- Hangul: 서윤희
- Hanja: 徐潤熙
- RR: Seo Yunhui
- MR: Sŏ Yunhŭi

Seo Yoon-hee (Korean: 서윤희; born 10 November 1984) is a South Korean badminton player. She graduated from the SacredHeart Girl's High School, and later joined the Samsung Electro-Mechanics team.

Seo played badminton at the 2004 Summer Olympics for Korea, defeating Pi Hongyan of France in the first round but losing to Petya Nedelcheva of Bulgaria in the round of 16.

== Achievements ==
=== World Junior Championships ===
Girls' singles
Year	Venue	Opponent	Score	Result
2002	Pretoria Showgrounds; Pretoria, South Africa	(China) Jiang Yanjiao	0–11, 11–8, 3–11	Silver

=== Asian Junior Championships ===
Girls' singles
Year	Venue	Opponent	Score	Result
2001	Taipei Gymnasium; Taipei, Taiwan	(South Korea) Jun Jae-youn	8–11, 11–8, 6–11	Silver

=== BWF Grand Prix ===
The BWF Grand Prix had two levels, the BWF Grand Prix and Grand Prix Gold. It was a series of badminton tournaments sanctioned by the Badminton World Federation (BWF) which was held from 2007 to 2017. The World Badminton Grand Prix has been sanctioned by the International Badminton Federation from 1983 to 2006.

Women's singles
Year	Tournament	Opponent	Score	Result
2005	Chinese Taipei Open	(England) Tracey Hallam	9–11, 7–11	(silver) Runner-up
2010	Australian Open	(Japan) Minatsu Mitani	22–20, 14–21, 21–19	(gold) Winner

Women's doubles
Year	Tournament	Partner	Opponent	Score	Result
2010	Australian Open	(South Korea) Kang Hae-won	(South Korea) Kim Min-seo (South Korea) Lee Kyung-won	17–21, 17–21	(silver) Runner-up

BWF Grand Prix Gold tournament
BWF Grand Prix tournament
