= 2007 Asian Junior Badminton Championships =

Tournament details
- Dates: 15-22 July 2007
- Edition: 10
- Venue: Stadium Juara
- Location: Kuala Lumpur, Malaysia

The 2007 Asian Junior Badminton Championships were held in Kuala Lumpur, Malaysia from 15–22 July.

== Venue ==
This tournament was held at Stadium Juara, Bukit Kiara Sports Complex, Kuala Lumpur.

== Medalists ==
Event	Gold	Silver	Bronze
Teams	Malaysia; Mohamad Arif Abdul Latif; Lim Fang Yang; Lim Khim Wah; Mak Hee Chun; Tan Wee Kiong; Lyddia Cheah; Goh Liu Ying; Vivian Hoo Kah Mun; Ng Hui Lin; Woon Khe Wei	China; Chai Biao; Chen Long; Gao Huan; Li Tian; Qiu Zihan; Wen Shengxun; Zhang Nan; Zhang Qi; Li Xuerui; Lin Shen; Liu Jie; Liu Xin; Wang Shixian; Wang Xiaoli; Xie Jing; Zhong Qianxin	Japan; Takeshi Kamura; Rei Sato; Keigo Sonoda; Kenichi Tago; Riichi Takeshita; Shu Wada; Anna Doi; Reika Kakiiwa; Ayane Kurihara; Misaki Matsutomo; Yuriko Miki; Masayo Nojirino; Shizuka Uchida
Teams	Malaysia; Mohamad Arif Abdul Latif; Lim Fang Yang; Lim Khim Wah; Mak Hee Chun; Tan Wee Kiong; Lyddia Cheah; Goh Liu Ying; Vivian Hoo Kah Mun; Ng Hui Lin; Woon Khe Wei	China; Chai Biao; Chen Long; Gao Huan; Li Tian; Qiu Zihan; Wen Shengxun; Zhang Nan; Zhang Qi; Li Xuerui; Lin Shen; Liu Jie; Liu Xin; Wang Shixian; Wang Xiaoli; Xie Jing; Zhong Qianxin	Indonesia; Nandang Arif; Albert Saputra; Wifqi Windarto; Afiat Yuris Wirawan; Febby Angguni; Richi Puspita Dili; Krisabella; Maria Febe Kusumastuti; Debby Susanto; Alfa Vivianita
Boys' singles	(China) Chen Long	(Malaysia) Mohamad Arif Abdul Latif	(Malaysia) Lim Fang Yang
Boys' singles	(China) Chen Long	(Malaysia) Mohamad Arif Abdul Latif	(Japan) Riichi Takeshita
Girls' singles	(China) Liu Xin	(Singapore) Gu Juan	(Singapore) Fu Mingtian
Girls' singles	(China) Liu Xin	(Singapore) Gu Juan	(Malaysia) Lydia Cheah
Boys' doubles	(China) Chai Biao (China) Li Tian	(Malaysia) Mohd Lutfi Zaim Abdul Khalid (Malaysia) Tan Wee Kiong	(China) Qiu Zihan (China) Zhang Nan
Boys' doubles	(China) Chai Biao (China) Li Tian	(Malaysia) Mohd Lutfi Zaim Abdul Khalid (Malaysia) Tan Wee Kiong	(Malaysia) Mohamad Arif Abdul Latif (Malaysia) Vountus Indra Mawan
Girls' doubles	(Indonesia) Richi Puspita Dili (Indonesia) Debby Susanto	(Malaysia) Tee Jing Yi (Malaysia) Lyddia Cheah	(South Korea) Jung Kyung-eun (South Korea) Yoo Hyun-young
Girls' doubles	(Indonesia) Richi Puspita Dili (Indonesia) Debby Susanto	(Malaysia) Tee Jing Yi (Malaysia) Lyddia Cheah	(Singapore) Fu Mingtian (Singapore) Yao Lei
Mixed doubles	(Malaysia) Tan Wee Kiong (Malaysia) Woon Khe Wei	(South Korea) Shin Baek-cheol (South Korea) Yoo Hyun-young	(China) Qiu Zihan (China) Lin Shen
Mixed doubles	(Malaysia) Tan Wee Kiong (Malaysia) Woon Khe Wei	(South Korea) Shin Baek-cheol (South Korea) Yoo Hyun-young	(Malaysia) Lim Khim Wah (Malaysia) Ng Hui Lin

== Medal table ==
Rank	Nation	Gold	Silver	Bronze	Total
1	China (CHN)	3	1	2	6
2	Malaysia (MAS)	2	3	4	9
3	Indonesia (INA)	1	0	1	2
4	Singapore (SIN)	0	1	2	3
5	South Korea (KOR)	0	1	1	2
6	Japan (JPN)	0	0	2	2
Totals (6 entries)		6	6	12	24
