= Yogendran Khrishnan =

Malaysian badminton player and coach (born 1982)

Personal information
- Born: 23 September 1982 (age 44) Kuala Lumpur, Malaysia
- Height: 1.78 m (5 ft 10 in)
- Weight: 62 kg (137 lb)

Sport
- Country: Malaysia
- Sport: Badminton
- Handedness: Right

Men's singles & doubles
- Highest ranking: 61 (MS 7 April 2011); 106 (MD 10 November 2011); 39 (XD 29 June 2017)
- BWF profile
Medal record
Men's badminton
Representing Malaysia
Asian Junior Championships
Bronze medal – third place	2000 Kyoto	Boys' team

Yogendran Khrishnan (born 23 September 1982) is a Malaysian former badminton player and current coaching staff for Malaysia's national men's singles department.

== Achievements ==
=== BWF Grand Prix (1 runner-up) ===
The BWF Grand Prix had two levels, the BWF Grand Prix and Grand Prix Gold. It was a series of badminton tournaments sanctioned by the Badminton World Federation (BWF) which was held from 2007 to 2017.

Men's singles
Year	Tournament	Opponent	Score	Result
2010	Australian Open	(Vietnam) Nguyễn Tiến Minh	14–21, 11–21	(silver) Runner-up

BWF Grand Prix Gold tournament
BWF Grand Prix tournament

=== BWF International Challenge/Series (7 titles, 6 runners-up) ===
Men's singles
Year	Tournament	Opponent	Score	Result
2005	Malaysia Satellite	(South Korea) Shon Seung-mo	6–15, 15–7, 6–15	(silver) Runner-up
2010	Altona International	(Australia) Nicholas Kidd	21–16, 21–11	(gold) Winner
2011	Altona International	(New Zealand) Michael Fowke	21–14, 21–12	(gold) Winner
2011	Counties Manukau International	(New Zealand) James Eunson	21–10, 21–17	(gold) Winner
2013	Auckland International	(New Zealand) Joe Wu	16–21, 20–22	(silver) Runner-up
2013	Bangladesh International	(Chinese Taipei) Hsu Jen-hao	23–21, 21–14	(gold) Winner

Men's doubles
Year	Tournament	Partner	Opponent	Score	Result
2011	Iran Fajr International	(Malaysia) Yeoh Kay Bin	(Malaysia) Mohd Razif Abdul Latif (Malaysia) Mohd Razif Abdul Rahman	Walkover	(silver) Runner-up
2017	Egypt International	(Germany) Jonathan Persson	(Jordan) Bahaedeen Ahmad Alshannik (Jordan) Mohd Naser Mansour Nayef	21–15, 21–18	(gold) Winner
2018	Egypt International	(Egypt) Ali Ahmed El-Khateeb	(Azerbaijan) Ade Resky Dwicahyo (Azerbaijan) Azmy Qowimuramadhoni	21–18, 16–21, 18–21	(silver) Runner-up

Mixed doubles
Year	Tournament	Partner	Opponent	Score	Result
2016	Mauritius International	(India) Prajakta Sawant	(India) Satwiksairaj Rankireddy (India) K. Maneesha	19–21, 21–11, 17–21	(silver) Runner-up
2017	Mauritius International	(India) Prajakta Sawant	(Germany) Jonathan Persson (Mauritius) Kate Foo Kune	21–7, 21–17	(gold) Winner
2017	Egypt International	(India) Prajakta Sawant	(Egypt) Ahmed Salah (Egypt) Menna Eltanany	21–15, 21–13	(gold) Winner
2017	Malaysia International	(India) Prajakta Sawant	(Japan) Hiroki Okamura (Japan) Naru Shinoya	10–21, 22–24	(silver) Runner-up

BWF International Challenge tournament
BWF International Series tournament
BWF Future Series tournament
