= Kim Min-seo (badminton) =

South Korean badminton player (born 1987)

Personal information
- Born: Kim Mi-young; 9 May 1987 (age 39)
- Height: 1.80 m (5 ft 11 in)

Sport
- Country: South Korea
- Sport: Badminton
- Handedness: Right
- Event: Women's singles & doubles

Women's singles & doubles
- BWF profile
Medal record
Women's badminton
Representing South Korea
East Asian Games
| Bronze medal – third place | 2009 Hong Kong | Women's team |
World Junior Championships
| Silver medal – second place | 2004 Richmond | Mixed team |
Asian Junior Championships
| Silver medal – second place | 2004 Hwacheon | Girls' team |

Kim Min-seo (Korean: 김민서; born 9 May 1987; as Kim Mi-young; Korean: 김미영) is a South Korean badminton player. Kim graduated from the Incheon National University, and affiliated with the Samsung Electro-Mechanics team in 2010. She was part of the Korean junior team that won the silver medals at the 2004 Asian Junior Championships in the girls' team event, and World Junior Championships in the mixed team event. Kim competed at the 2009 East Asian Games in Hong Kong, winning the bronze medal in the women's team event. At the 2010 Australian Open Kim captured two titles in the women's and mixed doubles event.

== Achievements ==
=== BWF Grand Prix ===
The BWF Grand Prix had two levels, the BWF Grand Prix and Grand Prix Gold. It was a series of badminton tournaments sanctioned by the Badminton World Federation (BWF) which was held from 2007 to 2017.

Women's doubles
| Year | Tournament | Partner | Opponent | Score | Result |
|---|---|---|---|---|---|
| 2010 | Australian Open | (South Korea) Lee Kyung-won | (South Korea) Kang Hae-won (South Korea) Seo Yoon-hee | 21–17, 21–17 | (gold) Winner |

Mixed doubles
| Year | Tournament | Partner | Opponent | Score | Result |
|---|---|---|---|---|---|
| 2010 | Australian Open | (South Korea) Cho Gun-woo | (Japan) Hajime Komiyama (Japan) Sayuri Asahara | 21–14, 21–10 | (gold) Winner |

BWF Grand Prix Gold tournament
BWF Grand Prix tournament

=== BWF International Challenge/Series ===
Women's doubles
| Year | Tournament | Partner | Opponent | Score | Result |
|---|---|---|---|---|---|
| 2003 | Canadian International | (South Korea) Jang Soo-young | (South Korea) Ha Jung-eun (South Korea) Lee Eun-woo | 15–1, 16–17, 9–15 | (silver) Runner-up |
| 2003 | Norwegian International | (South Korea) Jang Soo-young | (South Korea) Ha Jung-eun (South Korea) Oh Seul-ki | 6–15, 2–15 | (silver) Runner-up |
| 2008 | Korea International | (South Korea) Chang Ye-na | (South Korea) Ha Jung-eun (South Korea) Kim Min-jung | 15–21, 14–21 | (silver) Runner-up |
| 2008 | Malaysia International | (South Korea) Chang Ye-na | (South Korea) Bae Seung-hee (South Korea) Park Sun-young | 21–13, 15–21, 5–21 | (silver) Runner-up |

BWF International Challenge tournament
BWF International Series tournament
