= 2010 Australian Open Grand Prix =

Tournament details
- Dates: 13–18 July 2010
- Level: Grand Prix
- Total prize money: US$50,000
- Venue: Melbourne Sports and Aquatic Centre
- Location: Melbourne, Australia

Champions
- Men's singles: (Vietnam) Nguyễn Tiến Minh
- Women's singles: (South Korea) Seo Yoon-hee
- Men's doubles: (Japan) Hiroyuki Endo (Japan) Kenichi Hayakawa
- Women's doubles: (South Korea) Kim Min-seo (South Korea) Lee Kyung-won
- Mixed doubles: (South Korea) Cho Gun-woo (South Korea) Kim Min-seo

The 2010 Australian Open Grand Prix was a badminton tournament which took place at the Melbourne Sports and Aquatic Centre in Melbourne, Australia on 13–18 July 2010 and had a total purse of $50,000.

== Men's singles ==
=== Seeds ===
1. (Vietnam) Nguyễn Tiến Minh (champion)
2. (New Zealand) Joe Wu (third round)
3/4. (Scotland) Alistair Casey (quarterfinals)
3/4. (Indonesia) Alamsyah Yunus (semifinals)

5/8. (New Zealand) James Eunson (third round)
5/8. (Malaysia) Yogendran Khrishnan (final)
5/8. (Wales) Raj Popat (third round)
5/8. (England) Harry Wright (third round)

=== Finals ===
Quarterfinals
1	(Vietnam) Nguyễn Tiến Minh	21	21
(South Korea) Kim Dong-min	12	6
3/4	(Indonesia) Alamsyah Yunus	21	21
(South Korea) Park Tae-sang	10	15
5/8	(Malaysia) Yogendran Khrishnan	21	14	21
3/4	(Scotland) Alistair Casey	10	21	11
(South Korea) Hwang Jung-woon	18	21	21
(Indonesia) Yoga Pratama	21	18	9

Semifinals
1	(Vietnam) Nguyễn Tiến Minh	21	21
3/4	(Indonesia) Alamsyah Yunus	10	14
5/8	(Malaysia) Yogendran Khrishnan	21	9	21
(South Korea) Hwang Jung-woon	17	21	15

Final
1	(Vietnam) Nguyễn Tiến Minh	21	21
5/8	(Malaysia) Yogendran Khrishnan	14	11

== Women's singles ==
=== Seeds ===
1. (Japan) Megumi Taruno (second round)
2. (Malaysia) Anita Raj Kaur (first round)
3/4. (Australia) Leanne Choo (second round)
3/4. (United States) Karyn Velez (quarterfinals)

5/8. (Mauritius) Karen Foo Kune (first round)
5/8. (Vietnam) Lê Ngọc Nguyên Nhung (second round)
5/8. (Japan) Misaki Matsutomo (second round)
5/8. (Australia) Erica Pong (quarterfinals)

=== Finals ===
Semifinals
(Japan) Minatsu Mitani	13	22	21
(South Korea) Hwang Hye-youn	21	14	13
(South Korea) Seo Yoon-hee	21	21
(Australia) Huang Chia-chi	16	16	17

Final
(Japan) Minatsu Mitani	20	21	19
(South Korea) Seo Yoon-hee	22	14	21

== Men's doubles ==
=== Seeds ===
1. (Malaysia) Gan Teik Chai / Tan Bin Shen (semifinals)
2. (New Zealand) Oliver Leydon-Davis / Henry Tam (quarterfinals)

3/4. (Australia) Saliya Gunaratne / Chad Whitehead (semifinals)
3/4. (Australia) Ross Smith / Glenn Warfe (second round)

=== Finals ===
Semifinals
1	(Malaysia) Gan Teik Chai (Malaysia) Tan Bin Shen	17	23	19
(Japan) Hiroyuki Endo (Japan) Kenichi Hayakawa	21	21	21
3/4	(Australia) Saliya Gunaratne (Australia) Chad Whitehead	15	7
(South Korea) Kang Woo-kyum (South Korea) Park Tae-sang	21	21

Final
(Japan) Hiroyuki Endo (Japan) Kenichi Hayakawa	21	21
(South Korea) Kang Woo-kyum (South Korea) Park Tae-sang	15	16

== Women's doubles ==
=== Seeds ===
1. (Japan) Misaki Matsutomo / Ayaka Takahashi (quarterfinals)
2. (New Zealand) Danielle Barry / Donna Haliday (second round)

3/4. (Australia) Leanne Choo / Kate Wilson-Smith (second round)
3/4. (Australia) Leisha Cooper / Ann-Louise Slee (second round)

=== Finals ===
Semifinals
(South Korea) Kang Hae-won (South Korea) Seo Yoon-hee	21	21	21
(Japan) Minatsu Mitani (Japan) Megumi Taruno	12	23	16
(South Korea) Kim Min-seo (South Korea) Lee Kyung-won	21	21
(Japan) Sayuri Asahara (Japan) Yuko Kanamori	17	11

Final
(South Korea) Kang Hae-won (South Korea) Seo Yoon-hee	17	17
(South Korea) Kim Min-seo (South Korea) Lee Kyung-won	21	21

== Mixed doubles ==
=== Seeds ===
1. (New Zealand) Henry Tam / Donna Haliday (second round)
2. (Australia) Raj Veeran / Renuga Veeran (second round)
3/4. (Japan) Shintaro Ikeda / Reiko Shiota (withdrew)
3/4. (New Zealand) Joe Wu / Danielle Barry (first round)

5/8. (New Zealand) James Eunson / Stephanie Cheng (second round)
5/8. (New Zealand) Michael Fowke / Susannah Leydon-Davis (first round)
5/8. (Malaysia) Yogendran Khrishnan / Anita Raj Kaur (quarterfinals)
5/8. (Australia) Glenn Warfe / Kate Wilson-Smith (quarterfinals)

=== Finals ===
Semifinals
(Japan) Kenichi Hayakawa (Japan) Ayaka Takahashi	17	11
(South Korea) Cho Gun-woo (South Korea) Kim Min-seo	21	21
(Australia) Ben McCarthy (Australia) He Tian Tang	12	15
(Japan) Hajime Komiyama (Japan) Sayuri Asahara	21	21

Final
(South Korea) Cho Gun-woo (South Korea) Kim Min-seo	21	21
(Japan) Hajime Komiyama (Japan) Sayuri Asahara	14	10

Preceded by Malaysia Grand Prix Gold	BWF Grand Prix Gold and Grand Prix; 2010 season	Succeeded by Canada Open
