= Zhang Wei (badminton, born 1987) =

Chinese badminton player (born 1987)

Zhang Wei 张伟
Personal information
- Born: 2 February 1987 (age 39) Ningbo, Zhejiang, China

Sport
- Country: China
- Sport: Badminton
- Event: Men's & mixed doubles

Men's & mixed doubles
- BWF profile
Medal record
Men's badminton
Representing China
Asian Championships
Bronze medal – third place	2006 Johor Bahru	Mixed doubles
Summer Universiade
Silver medal – second place	2007 Bangkok	Mixed team
Bronze medal – third place	2007 Bangkok	Men's doubles
Asian Junior Championships
Silver medal – second place	2005 Jakarta	Boys' doubles
Silver medal – second place	2005 Jakarta	Mixed doubles
Silver medal – second place	2005 Jakarta	Boys' team

Zhang Wei (Chinese: 张伟, born 2 February 1987) is a former Chinese badminton player. He was the men's doubles champion at the 2004 National Championships partnered with Sang Yang. He was selected to join the national junior team competed at the 2005 Asian Junior Championships in Jakarta, and won three silver medals. He then won the bronze medal in the senior level at the 2006 Asian Championships in the mixed doubles event partnered with Yu Yang. Zhang also won a silver and bronze medal at the 2007 Summer Universiade in the mixed team and men's doubles event.

== Achievements ==
=== Asian Championships ===
Men's doubles
Year	Venue	Partner	Opponent	Score	Result
2006	Bandaraya Stadium; Johor Bahru, Malaysia	(China) Yu Yang	(Indonesia) Nova Widianto (Indonesia) Liliyana Natsir	9–21, 9–21	Bronze

=== Summer Universiade ===
Men's doubles
Year	Venue	Partner	Opponent	Score	Result
2007	Thammasat University; Pathum Thani, Thailand	(China) Shen Ye	(Thailand) Sudket Prapakamol (Thailand) Phattapol Ngensrisuk	13–21, 21–23	Bronze

=== Asian Junior Championships ===
Boys' doubles
Year	Venue	Partner	Opponent	Score	Result
2005	Jakarta, Indonesia	(China) Shen Ye	(South Korea) Cho Gun-woo (South Korea) Lee Yong-dae	15–8, 8–15, 8–15	Silver

Mixed doubles
Year	Venue	Partner	Opponent	Score	Result
2005	Jakarta, Indonesia	(China) Liao Jingmei	(South Korea) Lee Yong-dae (South Korea) Ha Jung-eun	15–11, 8–15, 2–15	Silver
