= Mohamad Arif Abdul Latif =

Malaysian badminton player (born 1989)

Personal information
- Born: 22 August 1989 (age 37) Negeri Sembilan, Malaysia
- Height: 1.70 m (5 ft 7 in)
- Weight: 65 kg (143 lb)
- Spouse: Rusydina Antardayu Riodingin (m. 2019)

Sport
- Country: Malaysia
- Sport: Badminton
- Handedness: Right

Men's singles & doubles
- Highest ranking: 30 (MS 11 July 2013); 29 (MD with Nur Mohd Azriyn Ayub, 30 April 2019); 64 (XD with Rusydina Antardayu Riodingin, 12 April 2018)
- BWF profile
Medal record
Men's badminton
Representing Malaysia
Southeast Asian Games
Silver medal – second place	2011 Jakarta–Palembang	Men's team
Silver medal – second place	2015 Singapore	Men's singles
Bronze medal – third place	2015 Singapore	Men's team
Summer Universiade
Bronze medal – third place	2015 Gwangju	Men's doubles
Bronze medal – third place	2015 Gwangju	Mixed team
World Junior Championships
Bronze medal – third place	2006 Incheon	Mixed team
Asian Junior Championships
Gold medal – first place	2007 Kuala Lumpur	Mixed team
Silver medal – second place	2006 Kuala Lumpur	Boys' doubles
Silver medal – second place	2006 Kuala Lumpur	Mixed team
Silver medal – second place	2007 Kuala Lumpur	Boys' singles
Bronze medal – third place	2005 Jakarta	Boys' team
Bronze medal – third place	2006 Kuala Lumpur	Boys' singles
Bronze medal – third place	2007 Kuala Lumpur	Boys' doubles

Mohamad Arif Abdul Latif (born 22 August 1989) is a Malaysian badminton player. He competed in the international tournament as an independent player. He married an Indonesian badminton player Rusydina Antardayu Riodingin on 14 September 2019.

== Career ==
Mohamad Arif Abdul Latif won the 2008 Mexico International and the 2011 Kedah Open. In 2013, he won Malaysia International Challenge tournament in men's singles event. In 2015, he won the silver medal at the Southeast Asian Games in men's singles event after defeated by his compatriot Chong Wei Feng 21–8, 21–9.

== Achievements ==
=== Southeast Asian Games ===
Men's singles
Year	Venue	Opponent	Score	Result
2015	Singapore Indoor Stadium, Singapore	(Malaysia) Chong Wei Feng	8–21, 9–21	Silver

=== Summer Universiade ===
Men's doubles
Year	Venue	Partner	Opponent	Score	Result
2015	Hwasun Hanium Culture Sports Center; Hwasun, South Korea	(Malaysia) Low Juan Shen	(China) Wang Yilyu (China) Zhang Wen	21–18, 17–21, 11–21	Bronze

=== World University Championships ===
Men's singles
Year	Venue	Opponent	Score	Result
2014	Municipal Sport Palace Vista Alegre; Córdoba, Spain	(China) Gao Huan	17–21, 15–21	Bronze

Men's doubles
Year	Venue	Partner	Opponent	Score	Result
2014	Municipal Sport Palace Vista Alegre; Córdoba, Spain	(Malaysia) Iskandar Zulkarnain Zainuddin	(China) Guo Junjie (China) Zhang Zhijun	21–16, 21–19	Gold

=== Asian Junior Championships ===
Boys' singles
Year	Venue	Opponent	Score	Result
2006	Kuala Lumpur Badminton Stadium; Kuala Lumpur, Malaysia	(Japan) Kenichi Tago	18–21, 19–21	Bronze
2007	Stadium Juara, Kuala Lumpur, Malaysia	(China) Chen Long	21–18, 18–21, 20–22	Silver

Boys' doubles
Year	Venue	Partner	Opponent	Score	Result
2006	Kuala Lumpur Badminton Stadium; Kuala Lumpur, Malaysia	(Malaysia) Vountus Indra Mawan	(South Korea) Cho Gun-woo (South Korea) Lee Yong-dae	12–21, 9–21	Silver
2007	Stadium Juara, Kuala Lumpur, Malaysia	(Malaysia) Vountus Indra Mawan	(China) Chai Biao (China) Li Tian	20–22, 15–21	Bronze

=== BWF World Tour (1 title) ===
The BWF World Tour, which was announced on 19 March 2017 and implemented in 2018, is a series of elite badminton tournaments sanctioned by the Badminton World Federation (BWF). The BWF World Tours are divided into levels of World Tour Finals, Super 1000, Super 750, Super 500, Super 300 (part of the HSBC World Tour), and the BWF Tour Super 100.

Men's doubles
Year	Tournament	Level	Partner	Opponent	Score	Result
2018	Russian Open	Super 100	(Malaysia) Nur Mohd Azriyn Ayub	(Russia) Konstantin Abramov (Russia) Alexandr Zinchenko	Walkover	(gold) Winner

=== BWF International Challenge/Series (5 titles, 1 runner-up) ===
Men's singles
Year	Tournament	Opponent	Score	Result
2008	Iran Fajr International	(Lithuania) Kęstutis Navickas	21–18, 21–18	(gold) Winner
2013	Malaysia International	(Indonesia) Rifan Fauzin Ivanudin	21–12, 21–13	(gold) Winner

Men's doubles
Year	Tournament	Partner	Opponent	Score	Result
2008	Iran Fajr International	(Malaysia) Vountus Indra Mawan	(Iran) Ali Shahhosseini (Iran) Nikzad Shiri	21–16, 14–21, 21–9	(gold) Winner
2018	Osaka International	(Malaysia) Nur Mohd Azriyn Ayub	(Japan) Hirokatsu Hashimoto (Japan) Hiroyuki Saeki	19–21, 21–15, 15–21	(silver) Runner-up
2023	Canadian International	(Canada) Jonathan Lai	(Canada) Adam Dong (Canada) Nyl Yakura	13–21, 21–17, 21–15	(gold) Winner

Mixed doubles
Year	Tournament	Partner	Opponent	Score	Result
2014	Maribyrnong International	(Indonesia) Rusydina Antardayu Riodingin	(Australia) Ross Smith (Australia) Renuga Veeran	21–18, 21–11	(gold) Winner

BWF International Challenge tournament
BWF International Series tournament
BWF Future Series tournament
