= Shen Ye =

Chinese badminton player (born 1987)

Shen Ye 沈燁
Personal information
- Born: 11 March 1987 (age 39) Changzhou, Jiangsu, China
- Height: 1.80 m (5 ft 11 in)
- Weight: 75 kg (165 lb)

Sport
- Country: China
- Sport: Badminton
- Handedness: Right

Men's doubles
- Highest ranking: 4 (17 January 2013)
- BWF profile
Medal record
Representing China
Thomas Cup
Gold medal – first place	2012 Wuhan	Men's team
Gold medal – first place	2008 Jakarta	Men's team
Asia Championships
Bronze medal – third place	2012 Qingdao	Men's doubles
Summer Universiade
Silver medal – second place	2007 Bangkok	Mixed team
Bronze medal – third place	2007 Bangkok	Men's doubles
World Junior Championships
Gold medal – first place	2004 Richmond	Mixed team
Bronze medal – third place	2004 Richmond	Boys' doubles
Asia Junior Championships
Gold medal – first place	2004 Hwacheon	Mixed doubles
Gold medal – first place	2004 Hwacheon	Boys' team
Silver medal – second place	2005 Jakarta	Boys' doubles
Silver medal – second place	2005 Jakarta	Boys' team
Bronze medal – third place	2004 Hwacheon	Boys' doubles

Shen Ye (simplified Chinese: 沈烨; traditional Chinese: 沈燁; born 11 March 1987) is a male Chinese badminton player.

== Achievements ==
=== Asian Championships ===
Men's doubles
Year	Venue	Partner	Opponent	Score	Result
2012	Qingdao Sports Centre Conson Stadium; Qingdao, China	(China) Hong Wei	(Japan) Hiroyuki Endo (Japan) Kenichi Hayakawa	12–21, 17–21	Bronze

=== Summer Universiade ===
Men's doubles
Year	Venue	Partner	Opponent	Score	Result
2007	Thammasat University; Pathum Thani, Thailand	(China) Zhang Wei	(Thailand) Sudket Prapakamol (Thailand) Phattapol Ngensrisuk	13–21, 21–23	Bronze

=== World Junior Championships ===
Boys' doubles
Year	Venue	Partner	Opponent	Score	Result
2004	Minoru Arena; Richmond, Canada	(China) He Hanbin	(South Korea) Lee Yong-dae (South Korea) Jung Jung-young	14–17, 15–11, 5–15	Bronze

=== Asian Junior Championships ===
Boys' doubles
Year	Venue	Partner	Opponent	Score	Result
2005	Tennis Indoor Senayan; Jakarta, Indonesia	(China) Zhang Wei	(South Korea) Cho Gun-woo (South Korea) Lee Yong-dae	15–8, 8–15, 8–15	Silver
2004	Hwacheon Indoor Stadium; Hwacheon, South Korea	(China) He Hanbin	(South Korea) Jung Jung-young (South Korea) Lee Yong-dae	15–5, 8–15, 5–15	Bronze

Mixed doubles
Year	Venue	Partner	Opponent	Score	Result
2004	Hwacheon Indoor Stadium; Hwacheon, South Korea	(China) Feng Chen	(South Korea) Yoo Yeon-seong (South Korea) Ha Jung-eun	15–11, 15–6	Gold

=== BWF Superseries ===
The BWF Superseries, launched on 14 December 2006 and implemented in 2007, is a series of elite badminton tournaments, sanctioned by Badminton World Federation (BWF). BWF Superseries has two level such as Superseries and Superseries Premier. A season of Superseries features twelve tournaments around the world, which introduced since 2011, with successful players invited to the Superseries Finals held at the year end.

Men's doubles
Year	Tournament	Partner	Opponent	Score	Result
2008	Denmark Open	(China) Fu Haifeng	(Indonesia) Markis Kido (Indonesia) Hendra Setiawan	18–21, 19–21	(silver) Runner-up

BWF Super Series Finals tournament
BWF Super Series Premier tournament
BWF Super Series tournament

=== BWF Grand Prix ===
The BWF Grand Prix has two levels: Grand Prix and Grand Prix Gold. It is a series of badminton tournaments, sanctioned by Badminton World Federation (BWF) since 2007.

Men's doubles
Year	Tournament	Partner	Opponent	Score	Result
2012	German Open	(China) Hong Wei	(South Korea) Jung Jae-sung (South Korea) Lee Yong-dae	21–19, 18–21, 21–19	(gold) Winner

BWF Grand Prix Gold tournament
BWF Grand Prix tournament
