= 2005 Asian Junior Badminton Championships =

Tournament details
- Dates: 11-17 July 2005
- Edition: 8
- Venue: Tennis Indoor Senayan
- Location: Jakarta, Indonesia

The 2005 Asian Junior Badminton Championships is an Asia continental junior championships to crown the best U-19 badminton players across Asia. This tournament were held in Tennis Indoor Senayan, Gelora Bung Karno Sports Complex, Jakarta, Indonesia from 11–17 July. In the team event, South Korean boys', and the Chinese girls' team won the gold medal respectively. In the individual event, China won three gold medal in the boys' singles, girls' singles and girls' doubles event, while South Korea won two gold medal in the boys' and mixed doubles.

== Medalists ==
Event	Gold	Silver	Bronze
Boys' teams	South Korea; Cho Gun-woo; Choi Sang-won; Han Ki-hoon; Hong Ji-hoon; Kwon Yi-goo; Lee Yong-dae; Shin Baek-cheol; Son Wan-ho	China; Chen Tianyu; Du Pengyu; Hu Wenqing; Li Tian; Liang Kaiquan; Lu Qicheng; Shen Ye; Zhang Wei	Malaysia; Mohamad Arif Abdul Latif; Chan Kwong Beng; Chong Wei Feng; Chong Li Qun; Goh Ying Jin; Hock Lai Lee; Tan Boon Heong
Boys' teams	South Korea; Cho Gun-woo; Choi Sang-won; Han Ki-hoon; Hong Ji-hoon; Kwon Yi-goo; Lee Yong-dae; Shin Baek-cheol; Son Wan-ho	China; Chen Tianyu; Du Pengyu; Hu Wenqing; Li Tian; Liang Kaiquan; Lu Qicheng; Shen Ye; Zhang Wei	Indonesia; Andreas Adityawarman; Fauzi Adnan; Tontowi Ahmad; Mohammad Ahsan; Sakti Kusuma; Viki Indra Okvana; Achmad Rivai; Syarifuddin
Girls' teams	China; Cheng Shu; Liao Jingmei; Liu Lan; Ma Jin; Tai Yi; Wang Lin; Wang Yihan	Malaysia; Norshahliza Baharum; Lyddia Cheah; Chong Sook Chin; Haw Chiou Hwee; Vivian Hoo Kah Mun; Ng Hui Lin; Julia Wong Pei Xian	Indonesia; Pia Zebadiah Bernadeth; Nitya Krishinda Maheswari; Bellaetrix Manuputty; Greysia Polii; Rosaria Yusfin Pungkasari; Yulianti
Girls' teams	China; Cheng Shu; Liao Jingmei; Liu Lan; Ma Jin; Tai Yi; Wang Lin; Wang Yihan	Malaysia; Norshahliza Baharum; Lyddia Cheah; Chong Sook Chin; Haw Chiou Hwee; Vivian Hoo Kah Mun; Ng Hui Lin; Julia Wong Pei Xian	South Korea; Chang Ye-na; Choi A-reum; Choi Joo-min; Ha Jung-eun; Hong Soo-jung; Jang Soo-young; Kim Moon-hi; Park So-ri; Yoo Hyun-young
Boys' singles	(China) Lu Qicheng	(South Korea) Hong Ji-hoon	(Japan) Hiroyuki Saeki
Boys' singles	(China) Lu Qicheng	(South Korea) Hong Ji-hoon	(Indonesia) Fauzi Adnan
Girls' singles	(China) Wang Lin	(China) Wang Yihan	(Indonesia) Bellaetrix Manuputty
Girls' singles	(China) Wang Lin	(China) Wang Yihan	(Hong Kong) Yip Pui Yin
Boys' doubles	(South Korea) Cho Gun-woo (South Korea) Lee Yong-dae	(China) Shen Ye (China) Zhang Wei	(Indonesia) Mohammad Ahsan (Indonesia) Viki Indra Okvana
Boys' doubles	(South Korea) Cho Gun-woo (South Korea) Lee Yong-dae	(China) Shen Ye (China) Zhang Wei	(Japan) Ryota Otaki (Japan) Takayuki Yasuda
Girls' doubles	(China) Cheng Shu (China) Liao Jingmei	(South Korea) Ha Jung-eun (South Korea) Hong Soo-jung	(Indonesia) Nitya Krishinda Maheswari (Indonesia) Greysia Polii
Girls' doubles	(China) Cheng Shu (China) Liao Jingmei	(South Korea) Ha Jung-eun (South Korea) Hong Soo-jung	(Hong Kong) Lam Sin Ying (Hong Kong) Yip Pui Yin
Mixed doubles	(South Korea) Lee Yong-dae (South Korea) Ha Jung-eun	(China) Zhang Wei (China) Liao Jingmei	(Chinese Taipei) Cheng Jen-yo (Chinese Taipei) Hsieh Pei-chen
Mixed doubles	(South Korea) Lee Yong-dae (South Korea) Ha Jung-eun	(China) Zhang Wei (China) Liao Jingmei	(South Korea) Hong Ji-hoon (South Korea) Jang Soo-young

== Results ==
=== Semifinals ===
Category	Winner	Runner-up	Score
Boys' singles	(China) Lu Qicheng	(Indonesia) Fauzi Adnan	15–7, 8–15, 15–5
Boys' singles	(South Korea) Hong Ji-hoon	(Japan) Hiroyuki Saeki	15–9, 15–12
Girls' singles	(China) Wang Yihan	(Indonesia) Bellaetrix Manuputty	11–6, 11–4
Girls' singles	(China) Wang Lin	(Hong Kong) Yip Pui Yin	11–5, 11–7
Boys' doubles	(China) Shen Ye (China) Zhang Wei	(Japan) Ryota Otaki (Japan) Takayuki Yasuda	15–11, 15–10
Boys' doubles	(South Korea) Cho Gun-woo (South Korea) Lee Yong-dae	(Indonesia) Mohammad Ahsan (Indonesia) Indra Viki Okvana	15–8, 15–2
Girls' doubles	(China) Cheng Shu (China) Liao Jingmei	(Indonesia) Nitya Krishinda Maheswari (Indonesia) Greysia Polii	7–15, 17–15, 15–13
Girls' doubles	(South Korea) Ha Jung-eun (South Korea) Hong Soo-jung	(Hong Kong) Lam Sin Ying (Hong Kong) Yip Pui Yin	15–7, 15–7
Mixed doubles	(South Korea) Lee Yong-dae (South Korea) Ha Jung-eun	(Chinese Taipei) Cheng Jen-yo (Chinese Taipei) Hsieh Pei-chen	15–4, 15–2
Mixed doubles	(China) Zhang Wei (China) Liao Jingmei	(South Korea) Hong Ji-hoon (South Korea) Jang Soo-young	15–3, 15–4

=== Finals ===
Category	Winners	Runners-up	Score
Boys' singles	(China) Lu Qicheng	(South Korea) Hong Ji-hoon	15–2, 15–3
Girls' singles	(China) Wang Lin	(China) Wang Yihan	11–4, 11–9
Boys' doubles	(South Korea) Lee Yong-dae (South Korea) Cho Gun-woo	(China) Shen Ye (China) Zhang Wei	8–15, 15–8, 15–8
Girls' doubles	(China) Cheng Shu (China) Liao Jingmei	(South Korea) Ha Jung-eun (South Korea) Hong Soo-jung	11–15, 15–12, 15–5
Mixed doubles	(South Korea) Lee Yong-dae (South Korea) Ha Jung-eun	(China) Zhang Wei (China) Liao Jingmei	11–15, 15–8, 15–2

== Medal table ==
Rank	Nation	Gold	Silver	Bronze	Total
1	China	4	4	0	8
2	South Korea	3	2	2	7
3	Malaysia	0	1	1	2
4	Indonesia*	0	0	6	6
5	Hong Kong	0	0	2	2
5	Japan	0	0	2	2
7	Chinese Taipei	0	0	1	1
Totals (7 entries)		7	7	14	28
