= Cho Gun-woo =

South Korean badminton player

Personal information
- Born: 조건우; 30 August 1988 (age 38) Hwasun, Jeollanam-do, South Korea
- Height: 1.83 m (6 ft 0 in)
- Weight: 74 kg (163 lb)

Sport
- Country: South Korea
- Sport: Badminton

Men's & mixed doubles
- Highest ranking: 11 (MD 23 June 2011); 59 (XD 14 July 2011)
- BWF profile
Medal record
Men's badminton
Representing South Korea
Asian Championships
Gold medal – first place	2010 New Delhi	Men's doubles
East Asian Games
Silver medal – second place	2009 Hong Kong	Men's team
World Junior Championships
Gold medal – first place	2006 Incheon	Boys' doubles
Gold medal – first place	2006 Incheon	Mixed team
Asian Junior Championships
Gold medal – first place	2005 Jakarta	Boys' doubles
Gold medal – first place	2005 Jakarta	Boys' team
Gold medal – first place	2006 Kuala Lumpur	Boys' doubles
Gold medal – first place	2006 Kuala Lumpur	Mixed team

Cho Gun-woo (Korean: 조건우; born 30 August 1988) is a South Korean badminton player from Samsung Electro-Mechanics, and joined the club since 2007.

Cho Gun-woo has focused his career on men's doubles, although he has competed in mixed doubles. His longest partnership was with Kwon Yi-goo staying together for most of the 2011 season, but his most successful run was at the 2012 Malaysia Super Series with Shin Baek-cheol. He has also competed with Kim Min-seo in mixed doubles.

== Achievements ==
=== Asian Championships ===
Men's doubles
Year	Venue	Partner	Opponent	Score	Result
2010	Siri Fort Indoor Stadium; New Delhi, India	(South Korea) Yoo Yeon-seong	(Chinese Taipei) Chen Hung-ling (Chinese Taipei) Lin Yu-lang	21–19, 12–21, 21–17	Gold

=== BWF World Junior Championships ===
Boys' doubles
Year	Venue	Partner	Opponent	Score	Result
2006	Samsan World Gymnasium; Incheon, South Korea	(South Korea) Lee Yong-dae	(China) Li Tian (China) Liu Xiaolong	21–12, 21–16	Gold

=== Asian Junior Championships ===
Boys' doubles
Year	Venue	Partner	Opponent	Score	Result
2005	Tennis Indoor Senayan; Jakarta, Indonesia	(South Korea) Lee Yong-dae	(China) Shen Ye (China) Zhang Wei	8–15, 15–8, 15–8	Gold
2006	Kuala Lumpur Badminton Stadium; Kuala Lumpur, Malaysia	(South Korea) Lee Yong-dae	(Malaysia) Mohamad Arif Abdul Latif (Malaysia) Vountus Indra Mawan	21–12, 21–9	Gold

=== BWF Superseries ===
The BWF Superseries, which was launched on 14 December 2006 and implemented in 2007, is a series of elite badminton tournaments, sanctioned by the Badminton World Federation (BWF). BWF Superseries levels are Superseries and Superseries Premier. A season of Superseries consists of twelve tournaments around the world that have been introduced since 2011. Successful players are invited to the Superseries Finals, which are held at the end of each year.

Men's doubles
Year	Tournament	Partner	Opponent	Score	Result
2010	Indonesia Open	(South Korea) Kwon Yi-goo	(Chinese Taipei) Fang Chieh-min (Chinese Taipei) Lee Sheng-mu	16–21, 15–21	(silver) Runner-up
2012	Malaysia Open	(South Korea) Shin Baek-cheol	(Chinese Taipei) Fang Chieh-min (Chinese Taipei) Lee Sheng-mu	21–16, 16–21, 16–21	(silver) Runner-up

BWF Super Series Finals tournament
BWF Super Series Premier tournament
BWF Super Series tournament

=== BWF Grand Prix ===
The BWF Grand Prix had two levels, the BWF Grand Prix and Grand Prix Gold. It was a series of badminton tournaments sanctioned by the Badminton World Federation (BWF) which was held from 2007 to 2017.

Men's doubles
Year	Tournament	Partner	Opponent	Score	Result
2007	Vietnam Open	(South Korea) Kang Myeong-won	(South Korea) Kwon Yi-goo (South Korea) Ko Sung-hyun	17–21, 12–21	(silver) Runner-up
2010	Chinese Taipei Open	(South Korea) Kwon Yi-goo	(South Korea) Jung Jae-sung (South Korea) Lee Yong-dae	10–21, 16–21	(silver) Runner-up

Mixed doubles
Year	Tournament	Partner	Opponent	Score	Result
2010	Australian Open	(South Korea) Kim Min-seo	(Japan) Hajime Komiyama (Japan) Sayuri Asahara	21–14, 21–10	(gold) Winner

BWF Grand Prix Gold tournament
BWF Grand Prix tournament

=== BWF International Challenge/Series ===
Men's doubles
Year	Tournament	Partner	Opponent	Score	Result
2005	Cheers Asian Satellite	(South Korea) Lee Yong-dae	(Malaysia) Hong Chieng Hun (Malaysia) Ng Kean Kok	15–13, 6–15, 3–15	(silver) Runner-up
2007	Osaka International	(South Korea) Han Sang-hoon	(Japan) Shintaro Ikeda (Japan) Shuichi Sakamoto	21–18, 16–21, 21–11	(gold) Winner
2007	Vietnam International	(South Korea) Yoo Yeon-seong	(Indonesia) Mohammad Ahsan (Indonesia) Bona Septano	15–21, 19–21	(silver) Runner-up
2008	Korean International	(South Korea) Yoo Yeon-seong	(South Korea) Jung Jae-sung (South Korea) Lee Yong-dae	16–21, 24–26	(silver) Runner-up
2011	Turkey International	(South Korea) Shin Baek-choel	(South Korea) Kim Ki-jung (South Korea) Kim Sa-rang	17–21, 21–16, 15–21	(silver) Runner-up
2012	India International	(South Korea) Kim Dae-eun	(South Korea) Ko Sung-hyun (South Korea) Lee Yong-dae	11–21, 10–21	(silver) Runner-up

Mixed doubles
Year	Tournament	Partner	Opponent	Score	Result
2007	Osaka International	(South Korea) Hong Soo-jung	(Japan) Keita Masuda (Japan) Miyuki Maeda	10–21, 9–21	(silver) Runner-up
2007	Cheers Asian Satellite	(South Korea) Kim Min-jung	(South Korea) Yoo Yeon-seong (South Korea) Ha Jung-eun	21–19, 21–15	(gold) Winner
2011	Turkey International	(South Korea) Yoo Hyun-young	(South Korea) Kim Sa-rang (South Korea) Lee So-hee	23–25, 21–9, 21–19	(gold) Winner

BWF International Challenge tournament
BWF International Series tournament

== Record against selected opponents ==
Men's doubles results with Shin Baek-cheol against Superseries Final finalists, Worlds Semi-finalists, and Olympic quarterfinalists.

- (China) Chai Biao & Guo Zhendong 1–0
- (Chinese Taipei) Fang Chieh-min & Lee Sheng-mu 0–2
- (Indonesia) Markis Kido & Hendra Setiawan 0–1
- (South Korea) Ko Sung-hyun & Yoo Yeon-seong 0–1
- (Malaysia) Koo Kien Keat & Tan Boon Heong 0–1
- (United States) Howard Bach & Tony Gunawan 1–0
