= Badminton Asia Junior Championships =

Badminton championships

The Badminton Asia Junior Championships is a tournament organized by the Badminton Asia governing body to crown the best junior badminton players (under-19) in Asia.

== Championships (U–19) ==
=== Location of the Asia Junior Championships (U–19) ===
The table below gives an overview of all host cities and countries of the Asia Junior Championships. The most recent games were held in Surakarta in 2025. The number in parentheses following the city/country denotes how many times that city/country has hosted the championships.

Host cities of the Asia Championships (Asia)

Year	Edition	Host city	Host country	Events
1997	1	Manila (1)	Philippines (1)	7
1998	2	Kuala Lumpur (1)	Malaysia (1)	7
1999	3	Yangon (1)	Myanmar (1)	7
2000	4	Kyoto (1)	Japan (1)	7
2001	5	Taipei (1)	Taiwan (1)	7
2002	6	Kuala Lumpur (2)	Malaysia (2)	7
2003	No competition			
2004	7	Hwacheon (1)	South Korea (1)	7
2005	8	Jakarta (1)	Indonesia (1)	7
2006	9	Kuala Lumpur (3)	Malaysia (3)	6
2007	10	Kuala Lumpur (4)	Malaysia (4)	6
2008	11	Kuala Lumpur (5)	Malaysia (5)	6
2009	12	Kuala Lumpur (6)	Malaysia (6)	6
2010	13	Kuala Lumpur (7)	Malaysia (7)	6
2011	14	Lucknow (1)	India (1)	6
2012	15	Gimcheon (1)	South Korea (2)	6

Year	Edition	Host city	Host country	Events
2013	16	Kota Kinabalu (1)	Malaysia (8)	6
2014	17	Taipei (2)	Taiwan (2)	6
2015	18	Bangkok (1)	Thailand (1)	6
2016	19	Bangkok (2)	Thailand (2)	6
2017	20	South Tangerang (1)	Indonesia (2)	6
2018	21	South Tangerang (2)	Indonesia (3)	6
2019	22	Suzhou (1)	China (1)	6
2020	No competition			
2021	No competition			
2022	No competition			
2023	23	Yogyakarta (1)	Indonesia (4)	6
2024	24	Yogyakarta (2)	Indonesia (5)	6
2025	25	Surakarta (1)	Indonesia (6)	6
2026	26	Yatsushiro (1)	Japan (2)	6
2027	27	Yatsushiro (2)	Japan (3)	6

=== All time medal table ===
Medals from 1997 to 2026.

Badminton Asia Junior Championships (U–19)
Rank	NOC	Gold	Silver	Bronze	Total
1	China (CHN)	101	59	78	238
2	South Korea (KOR)	19	41	51	111
3	Indonesia (INA)	17	16	63	96
4	Malaysia (MAS)	12	23	35	70
5	Japan (JPN)	8	5	33	46
6	Chinese Taipei (TPE)	3	7	20	30
7	Thailand (THA)	2	9	25	36
8	India (IND)	2	1	8	11
9	Singapore (SIN)	0	2	5	7
10	Hong Kong (HKG)	0	1	8	9
11	Vietnam (VIE)	0	0	2	2
Totals (11 entries)		164	164	328	656

=== Previous winners ===
==== Individual competition ====
Year	Men's singles	Women's singles	Men's doubles	Women's doubles	Mixed doubles
1997	(Indonesia) Taufik Hidayat	(China) Gong Ruina	(Malaysia) Chan Chong Ming (Malaysia) Jeremy Gan	(China) Yang Wei (China) Gao Ling	(China) Cheng Rui (China) Gao Ling
1998	(Chinese Taipei) Chien Yu-Hsiu	(China) Hu Ting	(Malaysia) Chan Chong Ming (Malaysia) Teo Kok Seng	(China) Gong Ruina (China) Huang Sui	(China) Jiang Shan (China) Huang Sui
1999	(China) Xiao Li	(China) Hu Ting	(China) Sang Yang (China) Chen Yu	(China) Xie Xingfang (China) Zhang Jiewen	(Indonesia) Hendry Kurniawan Saputra (Indonesia) Eny Erlangga
2000	(China) Lin Dan	(China) Yu Jin	(China) Sang Yang (China) Zheng Bo	(China) Zhang Yawen (China) Wei Yili	(China) Zheng Bo (China) Wei Yili
2001	(Indonesia) Ardiansyah	(South Korea) Jun Jae-youn	(South Korea) Lee Jae-jin (South Korea) Hwang Ji-man	(South Korea) Hwang Yu-mi (South Korea) Cho A Ra	(South Korea) Lee Jae-jin (South Korea) Hwang Yu-mi
2002	(South Korea) Park Sung-hwan	(China) Zhu Lin	(Malaysia) Koo Kien Keat (Malaysia) Ong Soon Hock	(China) Rong Lu (China) Du Jing	(Indonesia) Markis Kido (Indonesia) Liliyana Natsir
2003	No competition				
2004	(China) Chen Jin	(China) Jiang Yanjiao	(South Korea) Jung Jung-young (South Korea) Lee Yong-dae	(China) Ding Jiao (China) Zhao Yunlei	(China) Shen Ye (China) Feng Chen
2005	(China) Lu Qicheng	(China) Wang Lin	(South Korea) Lee Yong-dae (South Korea) Cho Gun-woo	(China) Cheng Shu (China) Liao Jingmei	(South Korea) Lee Yong-dae (South Korea) Ha Jung-eun
2006	(Japan) Kenichi Tago	(China) Wang Yihan	(South Korea) Lee Yong-dae (South Korea) Cho Gun-woo	(China) Ma Jin (China) Wang Xiaoli	(South Korea) Lee Yong-dae (South Korea) Yoo Hyun-young
2007	(China) Chen Long	(China) Liu Xin	(China) Chai Biao (China) Li Tian	(Indonesia) Richi Puspita Dili (Indonesia) Debby Susanto	(Malaysia) Tan Wee Kiong (Malaysia) Woon Khe Wei
2008	(China) Wang Zhengming	(China) Li Xuerui	(Malaysia) Mak Hee Chun (Malaysia) Teo Kok Siang	(China) Xie Jing (China) Zhong Qianxin	(China) Zhang Nan (China) Lu Lu
2009	(China) Tian Houwei	(China) Chen Xiaojia	(Indonesia) Angga Pratama (Indonesia) Yohanes Rendy Sugiarto	(China) Tang Jinhua (China) Xia Huan	(China) Lu Kai (China) Bao Yixin
2010	(China) Huang Yuxiang	(China) Suo Di	(South Korea) Kang Ji-wook (South Korea) Choi Seung-il	(China) Tang Jinhua (China) Xia Huan	(China) Liu Cheng (China) Bao Yixin
2011	(Malaysia) Zulfadli Zulkiffli	(China) Sun Yu	(Chinese Taipei) Lin Chia-yu (Chinese Taipei) Huang Po-jui	(Indonesia) Suci Rizki Andini (Indonesia) Tiara Rosalia Nuraidah	(Indonesia) Lukhi Apri Nugroho (Indonesia) Ririn Amelia
2012	(Japan) Kento Momota	(India) P. V. Sindhu	(Indonesia) Edi Subaktiar (Indonesia) Arya Maulana Aldiartama	(South Korea) Shin Seung-chan (South Korea) Lee So-hee	(South Korea) Choi Sol-gyu (South Korea) Chae Yoo-jung
2013	(Malaysia) Soo Teck Zhi	(Japan) Aya Ohori	(China) Li Junhui (China) Liu Yuchen	(China) Huang Dongping (China) Jia Yifan	(South Korea) Choi Sol-gyu (South Korea) Chae Yoo-jung
2014	(China) Shi Yuqi	(Japan) Akane Yamaguchi	(China) Huang Kaixiang (China) Zheng Siwei	(China) Chen Qingchen (China) Jia Yifan	(China) Huang Kaixiang (China) Chen Qingchen
2015	(China) Lin Guipu	(China) He Bingjiao	(China) He Jiting (China) Zheng Siwei	(China) Du Yue (China) Li Yinhui	(China) Zheng Siwei (China) Chen Qingchen
2016	(China) Sun Feixiang	(China) Chen Yufei	(China) Han Chengkai (China) Zhou Haodong	(China) Du Yue (China) Xu Ya	(China) He Jiting (China) Du Yue
2017	(Malaysia) Leong Jun Hao	(China) Han Yue	(China) Di Zijian (China) Wang Chang	(South Korea) Baek Ha-na (South Korea) Lee Yu-rim	(Indonesia) Rehan Naufal Kusharjanto (Indonesia) Siti Fadia Silva Ramadhanti
2018	(India) Lakshya Sen	(China) Wang Zhiyi	(China) Di Zijian (China) Wang Chang	(Indonesia) Febriana Dwipuji Kusuma (Indonesia) Ribka Sugiarto	(China) Guo Xinwa (China) Liu Xuanxuan
2019	(Thailand) Kunlavut Vitidsarn	(China) Zhou Meng	(Indonesia) Leo Rolly Carnando (Indonesia) Daniel Marthin	(China) Li Yijing (China) Luo Xumin	(Indonesia) Leo Rolly Carnando (Indonesia) Indah Cahya Sari Jamil
2020	Cancelled (Note: This tournament, originally to be played from 15 to 19 July, was later cancelled due to the COVID-19 pandemic in mainland China.)				
2021– 2022	No competition				
2023	(China) Hu Zhe'an	(Indonesia) Mutiara Ayu Puspitasari	(China) Ma Shang (China) Zhu Yijun	(Japan) Mei Sudo (Japan) Nao Yamakita	(China) Zhu Yijun (China) Huang Kexin
2024	(China) Hu Zhe'an	(China) Xu Wenjing	(China) Hu Keyuan (China) Lin Xiangyi	(China) Chen Fanshutian (China) Liu Jiayue	(China) Lin Xiangyi (China) Liu Yuanyuan
2025	(Indonesia) Zaki Ubaidillah	(China) Yin Yiqing	(China) Chen Junting (China) Liu Junrong	(China) Cao Zihan (China) Chen Fanshutian	(China) Chen Junting (China) Cao Zihan
2026	(China) Hong Tianyue	(China) Yin Yiqing	(Chinese Taipei) Huang Tzu-yuan (Chinese Taipei) Lin Sheng-ming	(Japan) Aoi Banno (Japan) Yuzu Ueno	(Malaysia) Ahmad Redzuan (Malaysia) Low Zi Yu

==== Team competition ====
The team competition were divided into men's and women's team events until 2005.

Year	Men	Women
1997	China	China
1998	China	China
1999	Indonesia	China
2000	China	China
2001	Malaysia	South Korea
2002	Indonesia	China
2003	No competition	
2004	China	China
2005	South Korea	China

The mixed team event is held since 2006.

Year	Winners
2006	South Korea
2007	Malaysia
2008	China
2009	Malaysia
2010	China
2011	China
2012	Japan
2013	China
2014	China
2015	China
2016	China
2017	South Korea
2018	China
2019	Thailand
2020	Cancelled (Note: This tournament, originally to be played from 11 to 14 July, was later cancelled due to the COVID-19 pandemic in mainland China.)
2021– 2022	No competition
2023	Japan
2024	China
2025	China
2026	China

== Youth Championships (U–17 & U–15) ==
=== Location of the Asia Youth Championships (U–17 & U–15) ===
The table below gives an overview of all host cities and countries of the Asia Junior Championships. The most recent games were held in Chengdu in 2026. The number in parentheses following the city/country denotes how many times that city/country has hosted the championships.

Host cities of the Asia Championships (Asia)

Year	Edition	Host city	Host country	Events
2006	1	Tomioka (1)	Japan (1)	8
2007	2	Narita (1)	Japan (2)	8
2008	3	Chiba (1)	Japan (3)	8
2009	4	Chiba (2)	Japan (4)	8
2010	5	Chiba (3)	Japan (5)	8
2011	6	Chiba (4)	Japan (6)	8
2012	7	Dongguan (1)	China (1)	8
2013	8	Kudus (1)	Indonesia (1)	10
2014	9	Bangkok (1)	Thailand (1)	10
2015	10	Kudus (2)	Indonesia (2)	10
2016	11	Kudus (3)	Indonesia (3)	10

Year	Edition	Host city	Host country	Events
2017	12	Yangon (1)	Myanmar (1)	10
2018	13	Mandalay (1)	Myanmar (2)	10
2019	14	Surabaya (1)	Indonesia (4)	10
2020	No competition because of COVID-19 pandemic			
2021	No competition because of COVID-19 pandemic			
2022	15	Nonthaburi (1)	Thailand (2)	10
2023	16	Chengdu (1)	China (2)	10
2024	17	Chengdu (2)	China (3)	10
2025	18	Chengdu (3)	China (4)	10
2026	19	Chengdu (4)	China (5)	10

=== Previous winners ===
==== Individual competition U–17 ====
Year	Men's singles	Women's singles	Men's doubles	Women's doubles	Mixed doubles
2006	(China) Zhang Sheng	(China) Jia Wei	(China) Guo Junjie (China) He Xianglong	(China) Li Xuerui (China) Li Yi	No competition
2007	(South Korea) Choi Young-woo	(South Korea) Eom Hye-won	(South Korea) Choi Young-woo (South Korea) Hyun Dong-ki	(South Korea) Eom Hye-won (South Korea) Lee Sa-rang	No competition
2008	(South Korea) Choi Seung-il	(Japan) Risa Nakamura	(South Korea) Kang Ji-wook (South Korea) Choi Seung-il	(Japan) Ayumi Konno (Japan) Rina Wakino	No competition
2009	(Thailand) Khosit Phetpradab	(South Korea) Lee So-hee	(Thailand) Khosit Phetpradab (Thailand) Sitthikom Thammasin	(South Korea) Park So-young (South Korea) Kim Ji-won	No competition
2010	(Japan) Kento Momota	(Japan) Nozomi Okuhara	(South Korea) Jeong Jae-uk (South Korea) Bae Kwon-young	(South Korea) Lee So-hee (South Korea) Shin Seung-chan	No competition
2011	(Thailand) Sitthikom Thammasin	(Japan) Aya Ohori	(Japan) Takuro Hoki (Japan) Yugo Kobayashi	(Thailand) Wiranpatch Hongchookeat (Thailand) Puttita Supajirakul	No competition
2012	(China) Shi Yuqi	(China) He Bingjiao	(China) Zhou Bowei (China) Sun Feixiang	(China) He Bingjiao (China) Du Yue	No competition
2013	(Indonesia) Firman Abdul Kholik	(Japan) Natsuki Nidaira	(India) Arjun M. R. (India) Chirag Shetty	(South Korea) Kim Ga-eun (South Korea) Kim Hyang-im	(Indonesia) Andika Ramadiansyah (Indonesia) Marsheilla Gischa Islami
2014	(Thailand) Kantaphon Wangcharoen	(South Korea) Kim Ga-eun	(South Korea) Lee Hong-sub (South Korea) Lim Su-min	(Indonesia) Apriyani Rahayu (Indonesia) Jauza Fadhila Sugiarto	(Indonesia) Akbar Gusti Ramadhani (Indonesia) Serena Kani
2015	(Chinese Taipei) Chen Chi-ting	(Singapore) Yeo Jia Min	(India) Krishna Prasad Garaga (India) Satwiksairaj Rankireddy	(Singapore) Crystal Wong (Singapore) Yeo Jia Min	(Thailand) Pachaarapol Nipornram (Thailand) Natthakorn Jaiareree
2016	(Thailand) Kunlavut Vitidsarn	(Thailand) Pattarasuda Chaiwan	(Indonesia) Haffiz Nur Adila (Indonesia) Rehan Naufal Kusharjanto	(Indonesia) Agatha Imanuela (Indonesia) Siti Fadia Silva Ramadhanti	(Thailand) Kunlavut Vitidsarn (Thailand) Pattarasuda Chaiwan
2017	(Thailand) Kunlavut Vitidsarn	(Thailand) Pattarasuda Chaiwan	(Chinese Taipei) Cheng Kai-wen (Chinese Taipei) Chiu Yuh-hong	(Indonesia) Putri Larasati (Indonesia) Melani Mamahit	(Hong Kong) Ko Shing Hei (Hong Kong) Yeung Pui Lam
2018	(South Korea) Jin Yong	(Thailand) Benyapa Aimsaard	(Malaysia) Demond Anthony Samin (Malaysia) Junaidi Arif	(Thailand) Benyapa Aimsaard (Thailand) Peeraya Khantaruangsakul	(Hong Kong) Ko Shing Hei (Hong Kong) Lui Lok Lok
2019	(Malaysia) Justin Hoh	(Japan) Hina Akechi	(Indonesia) Rahmat Hidayat (Indonesia) Davin Rutama	(Thailand) Pornpicha Choeikeewong (Thailand) Pornnicha Suwatnodom	(Indonesia) Rahmat Hidayat (Indonesia) Febi Setianingrum
2020– 2021	No competition				
2022	(Chinese Taipei) Su Wei-cheng	(Thailand) Sarunrak Vitidsarn	(Chinese Taipei) Lai Po-yu (Chinese Taipei) Lin Yi-hao	(South Korea) Kim Min-ji (South Korea) Kim Min-sun	(Chinese Taipei) Bao Xin Da Gu La Wai (Chinese Taipei) Hsieh Mi-yen
2023	(China) Zhang Zhijie	(Thailand) Yataweemin Ketklieng	(China) Chen Junting (China) Li Hongyi	(Chinese Taipei) Chen Yan-fei (Chinese Taipei) Sun Liang-ching	(China) Liu Junrong (China) Chen Fanshutian
2024	(Indonesia) Radithya Bayu Wardhana	(China) Shi Sichen	(Indonesia) Muhammad Rizki Mubarrok (Indonesia) Raihan Daffa Edsel Pramono	(China) Liu Yinuo (China) Xu Xiuyan	(Chinese Taipei) Lin Sheng-ming (Chinese Taipei) Liao Pin-chen
2025	(China) Pan Junjie	(India) Diksha Sudhakar	(Chinese Taipei) Chen Ping-hsuan (Chinese Taipei) Lee Wei-ting	(Thailand) Phattharin Aiamvareesrisakul (Thailand) Sarisa Janpeng	(Chinese Taipei) Lee Wei-ting (Chinese Taipei) Chen Yu-hsi
2026	(United Arab Emirates) Riyan Malhan	(India) Tanvi Patri	(Chinese Taipei) Chu Peng-yu (Chinese Taipei) Hsu Shang-an	(China) He Jing (China) Yang Dan	(China) Mo Zhilin (China) Yang Dan

==== Individual competition U-15 ====
Year	Men's singles	Women's singles	Men's doubles	Women's doubles	Mixed doubles
2006	(Japan) Hiroki Takeuchi	(Japan) Natsumi Uratani	(South Korea) Choi Seung-il (South Korea) Kim Min-ki	(Japan) Ayumi Mine (Japan) Kurumi Yonao	No competition
2007	(Hong Kong) Lee Chun Hei	(South Korea) Lee So-hee	(Hong Kong) Lee Chun Hei (Hong Kong) Ng Ka Long	(South Korea) Lee So-hee (South Korea) Shin Seung-chan	No competition
2008	(South Korea) Kim Dong-tak	(South Korea) Lee So-hee	(South Korea) Kim Dong-tak (South Korea) Jun Bong-chan	(South Korea) Lee So-hee (South Korea) Kim Ji-won	No competition
2009	(Thailand) Sitthikom Thammasin	(Thailand) Soikhaimuk Hoongchookeat	(Japan) Takuro Hoki (Japan) Yuki Nakazato	(Japan) Chisato Hoshi (Japan) Ayako Sakuramoto	No competition
2010	(Indonesia) Jonatan Christie	(Japan) Aya Ohori	(Indonesia) Jeka Wiratama (Indonesia) Rafidias Akhdan Nugroho	(South Korea) Shim Jae-rin (South Korea) Lee Sun-min	No competition
2011	(South Korea) Lee Jun-su	(Japan) Akane Yamaguchi	(South Korea) Choi Jong-woo (South Korea) Seo Seung-jae	(Japan) Chiharu Shida (Japan) Akane Yamaguchi	No competition
2012	(China) Chen Jinlin	(Thailand) Pornpawee Chochuwong	(Malaysia) Tan Jia Wei (Malaysia) Ooi Zi Heng	(South Korea) Kim Hyang-im (South Korea) Kim Hye-jung	No competition
2013	(India) Siril Verma	(Singapore) Yeo Jia Min	(Indonesia) Rinov Rivaldy (Indonesia) Rifki Nur Alam	(South Korea) Seong Ah-yeong (South Korea) Seong Na-yeong	(Indonesia) Rinov Rivaldy (Indonesia) Vania Arianti Sukoco
2014	(Thailand) Kunlavut Vitidsarn	(Thailand) Pattarasuda Chaiwan	(Malaysia) Chia Wei Jie (Malaysia) Chang Yee Jun	(South Korea) Park Ga-eun (South Korea) Lee Yu-rim	(Thailand) Kunlavut Vitidsarn (Thailand) Pattarasuda Chaiwan
2015	(Japan) Kodai Naraoka	(Thailand) Pattarasuda Chaiwan	(Thailand) Setthanan Piyawatcharavijit (Thailand) Kunlavut Vitidsarn	(Indonesia) Metya Inayah Cindiani (Indonesia) Indah Cahya Sari Jamil	(Thailand) Kunlavut Vitidsarn (Thailand) Pattarasuda Chaiwan
2016	(Indonesia) Muhamad Akbar Firdaus	(South Korea) An Se-young	(South Korea) Lee Hak-joo (South Korea) Lee Sang-hyup	(South Korea) Lee So-yul (South Korea) Yoon Ye-lim	(Hong Kong) Ko Shing Hei (Hong Kong) Lui Lok Lok
2017	(Japan) Riki Takei	(India) Samiya Farooqui	(Malaysia) Fazriq Razif (Malaysia) Ong Zhen Yi	(Thailand) Pornpicha Choeikeewong (Thailand) Pornnicha Suwatnodom	(Indonesia) Muhammad Ridwanul Arifin (Indonesia) Fadillah Nur Hidayah
2018	(Chinese Taipei) Kuo Kuan-lin	(Japan) Hina Akechi	(Malaysia) Fazriq Razif (Malaysia) Justin Hoh	(India) Meghana Reddy (India) Tasnim Mir	(Indonesia) Putra Erwiansyah (Indonesia) Febi Setianingrum
2019	(Indonesia) Alwi Farhan	(India) Tasnim Mir	(Indonesia) Jonathan Farrell Gosal (Indonesia) Adrian Pratama	(South Korea) Kim Min-ji (South Korea) Kim Min-seon	(Japan) Yudai Okimoto (Japan) Nao Yamakita
2020– 2021	No competition				
2022	(Chinese Taipei) Yih Chung-hsiang	(Thailand) Anyapat Phichitpreechasak	(South Korea) Jeong Da-hwan (South Korea) Na Seon-jae	(Thailand) Yataweemin Ketklieng (Thailand) Passa-Orn Phannachet	(Chinese Taipei) Huang Tzu-yuan (Chinese Taipei) Kung Chia-yi
2023	(India) Bornil Aakash Changmai	(Japan) Meisa Anami	(Japan) Shunki Hagiwara (Japan) Mahiro Matsumoto	(China) Zhang Yixin (China) Zhao Xinyi	(Thailand) Tachin Wiriyachairerk (Thailand) Phattharin Aiamvareesrisakul
2024	(China) Qian Jiaxing	(India) Tanvi Patri	(Chinese Taipei) Chen Yu-xiang (Chinese Taipei) Kao En-chi	(South Korea) Lee Yun-seo (South Korea) Park Yoo-jeong	(South Korea) Seo Hyun-kyu (South Korea) Park Yoo-jeong
2025	(China) Zhang Jialun	(India) Shaina Manimuthu	(China) Wu Hua (China) Zheng Huaibo	(China) Zhang Zhihan (China) Zhang Zhirui	(China) Zhu Yankai (China) Zhang Zhirui
2026	(China) Zhang Jialun	(China) Qiang Qihan	(Chinese Taipei) Ho Bo-lin (Chinese Taipei) Hou Jui-en	(China) Luo Yaxi (China) Zhu Yushang	(China) Dong Hanhong (China) Luo Yaxi

== Asian junior champions who later became Asian champions ==
List of players who have won Asian Junior Championships and later won the Asia Championships to become both the Asian Junior Champion and Asian Champion.

Type	Player	Asian junior champions (year)	Asian champions (year)
Men's singles	(China) Chen Hong	1997	1999
Men's singles	(Indonesia) Taufik Hidayat	1997	2000, 2004, 2007
Women's doubles	(China) Gao Ling	1997 (XD: 1997)	2001 (XD: 2002)
Women's doubles	(China) Huang Sui	1998	2001
Women's doubles	(China) Zhang Jiewen	1999	2002, 2008
Men's singles	(China) Lin Dan	2000	2010, 2011, 2014, 2015
Women's singles	(South Korea) Jun Jae-youn	2001	2004
Mixed doubles	(Indonesia) Liliyana Natsir	2002	2006, 2015
Mixed doubles	(Indonesia) Markis Kido	2002	(MD: 2005, 2009)
Women's doubles	(China) Du Jing	2002	2006
Men's singles	(South Korea) Park Sung-hwan	2002	2008
Women's singles	(China) Zhu Lin	2002	2009
Women's singles	(China) Jiang Yanjiao	2004	2007, 2008
Men's doubles	(South Korea) Lee Yong-dae	2004, 2005, 2006 (XD: 2005, 2006)	2008, 2013, 2015, 2016 (XD: 2009)
Women's doubles	(China) Zhao Yunlei	2004	2012 (XD: 2011, 2012, 2016)
Men's singles	(China) Chen Jin	2004	2012
Men's doubles	(South Korea) Cho Gun-woo	2005, 2006	2010
Women's doubles	(China) Wang Xiaoli	2006	2009, 2011, 2013
Women's doubles	(China) Ma Jin	2006	2009, 2015
Women's singles	(China) Wang Yihan	2006	2011, 2013, 2016
Men's singles	(China) Chen Long	2007	2017
Women's singles	(China) Li Xuerui	2008	2010, 2012
Mixed doubles	(China) Zhang Nan	2008	2011, 2012, 2016
Mixed doubles	(China) Lu Kai	2009	2017
Men's singles	(Japan) Kento Momota	2012	2018, 2019
Women's doubles	(South Korea) Lee So-hee	2012	2024
Men's doubles	(China) Li Junhui	2013	2017, 2018
Men's doubles	(China) Liu Yuchen	2013	2017, 2018
Women's doubles	(China) Huang Dongping	2013	(XD: 2018, 2019, 2024)
Women's doubles	(China) Jia Yifan	2013, 2014	2019, 2022
Women's singles	(Japan) Akane Yamaguchi	2014	2019
Women's doubles	(China) Chen Qingchen	2014 (XD: 2014, 2015)	2019, 2022
Mixed's doubles	(China) Zheng Siwei	2015 (MD: 2014, 2015)	2022
Women's doubles	(South Korea) Baek Ha-na	2017	2024
Men's doubles	(China) Wang Chang	2017, 2018	2024
Women's singles	(China) Wang Zhiyi	2018	2022, 2024
Men's singles	(Thailand) Kunlavut Vitidsarn	2019	2025

== See also ==
- Badminton Asia Championships
