= 2013 Indian Badminton League =

Tournament details
- Dates: 14 August – 31 August
- Administrator(s): Badminton Association of India
- Format(s): Round-robin and Knock-out
- Host(s): India
- Venue(s): 6
- Teams: 6

Final positions
- Champions: Hyderabad HotShots (1st title)
- Runner-up: Awadhe Warriors
- Third Place: Mumbai Marathas, Pune Pistons

Tournament summary
- Matches played: 16

2013 Indian Badminton League was the first season of Indian Badminton League started from 14 August 2013.

== Teams ==
Six teams participate in the first edition of Indian Badminton League:

=== Mumbai Marathas ===
- (Malaysia) Lee Chong Wei (Captain)
- (India) Pranav Chopra
- (India) Siki Reddy
- (India) Manu Attri
- (India) P. C. Thulasi
- (India) Sumeeth Reddy
- (India) Rasika Raje
- (India) Harsheel Dani
- (Denmark) Tine Baun
- (Germany) Marc Zwiebler
- (Russia) Vladimir Ivanov

=== Pune Pistons ===
- (India) Ashwini Ponnappa (Captain)
- (India) Saurabh Varma
- (India) Anup Sridhar
- (India) Sanave Thomas
- (India) Arun Vishnu
- (India) Rupesh Kumar K. T.
- (Vietnam) Nguyen Tien Minh
- (Germany) Juliane Schenk
- (Denmark) Joachim Fischer Nielsen
- (Malaysia) Tan Wee Kiong

=== Banga Beats ===
- (India) Parupalli Kashyap (Captain)
- (India) Akshay Dewalkar
- (India) Aparna Balan
- (India) Arvind Bhat
- (India) Aditya Prakash
- (India) J. Meghana
- (India) Daniel Farid
- (Hong Kong) Hu Yun
- (Denmark) Carsten Mogensen
- (Chinese Taipei) Tai Tzu-ying
- (Spain) Carolina Marín

=== Hyderabad HotShots ===
- (India) Saina Nehwal (Captain)
- (India) Pradenya Gadre
- (India) Tarun Kona
- (India) Ajay Jayaram
- (India) Kanthi Visalakshi P.
- (India) Shubhankar Dey
- (India) C. Rahul Yadav
- (Indonesia) Taufik Hidayat
- (Thailand) Tanongsak
- (Malaysia) Goh V Shem
- (Malaysia) Lim Khim Wah

=== Delhi Smashers ===
- (India) Jwala Gutta (Captain)
- (India) H. S. Prannoy
- (India) Sai Praneeth B.
- (India) Arundhati Panthawane
- (India) V. Diju
- (Thailand) Nichaon Jindapon
- (India) Prajakta Sawant
- (Malaysia) Tan Boon Heong
- (Malaysia) Koo Kien Keat
- (Hong Kong) Wong Wing Ki

=== Awadhe Warriors ===
- (India) P.V. Sindhu (Captain)
- (India) Gurusai Datt
- (India) K. Srikanth
- (India) Ruthvika Shivani
- (India) K. Maneesha
- (India) Nanda Gopal
- (India) Vinay Singh
- (Thailand) Sapsiree Taerattanachai
- (Indonesia) Markis Kido
- (Malaysia) Chong Wei Feng
- (Denmark) Mathias Boe

== Venues ==
Six venues have been selected for the first edition of Indian Badminton League:

Locations of IBL teams

Delhi	Lucknow	Hyderabad
Delhi Smashers	Awadhe Warriors	Hyderabad HotShots
DDA Badminton and Squash Stadium	Babu Banarasi Das Indoor Stadium	Gachibowli Indoor Stadium
Capacity: 5,000	Capacity: 5,000	Capacity: 4,000
Bangalore	Mumbai	Pune
Banga Beats	Mumbai Marathas	Pune Pistons
Kanteerava Indoor Stadium	Sardar Vallabhbhai Patel Indoor Stadium, NSCI	Shree Shiv Chhatrapati Sports Complex, Badminton Hall
Capacity: 4,000	Capacity: 5,000	Capacity: 3,800

== Standings ==
Team	Pts	Pld	W	L	GW	GL
Hyderabad Hotshots	17	5	3	2	14	11
Awadhe Warriors	16	5	3	2	13	12
Pune Pistons	16	5	3	2	13	12
Mumbai Marathas	15	5	2	3	13	12
Delhi Smashers	13	5	2	3	11	14
Banga Beats	13	5	2	3	11	14

== Schedule ==
The following is the schedule for 2013 Indian Badminton League.

=== League Matches ===
- (home team) represents designated home game for the club.

==== Delhi ====
14 August, 20:00	Delhi Smashers (home team)	2 – 3	Pune Pistons
15 August, 16:00	Hyderabad HotShots	3 – 2	Awadhe Warriors
15 August, 20:00	Banga Beats	2 – 3	Mumbai Marathas

==== Lucknow ====
17 August, 16:00	Delhi Smashers	3 – 2	Hyderabad HotShots
17 August, 20:00	Mumbai Marathas	2 – 3	Pune Pistons
18 August, 20:00	Awadhe Warriors (home team)	1 – 4	Banga Beats

==== Mumbai ====
19 August, 20:00	Hyderabad HotShots	4 – 1	Pune Pistons
20 August, 18:00	Mumbai Marathas (home team)	4 - 1	Delhi Smashers

==== Pune ====
22 August, 16:00	Hyderabad HotShots	3 – 2	Mumbai Masters
22 August, 20:00	Delhi Smashers	1 – 4	Awadhe Warriors
23 August, 18:00	Pune Pistons (home team)	4 – 1	Banga Beats

==== Bangalore ====
24 August, 20:00	Awadhe Warriors	3 – 2	Mumbai Masters
25 August, 18:00	Banga Beats (home team)	1 – 4	Delhi Smashers

==== Hyderabad ====
26 August, 20:00	Awadhe Warriors	3 – 2	Pune Pistons
27 August, 18:00	Hyderabad HotShots (home team)	2 – 3	Banga Beats

=== Knockout stage ===
Semi-finals
28 August, 20:00 – Hyderabad
Hyderabad HotShots	3
Pune Pistons	0
29 August, 20:00 – Bangalore
Awadhe Warriors	3
Mumbai Marathas	2

Final
31 August, 20:00 – Mumbai
Hyderabad HotShots	3
Awadhe Warriors	1
