= Chennai Superstarz =

Indian badminton club

- Sport: Badminton
- Founded: 2015 as Chennai Smashers
- First season: 2016
- League: Premier Badminton League
- Based in: Chennai, India
- Home ground: Jawaharlal Nehru Stadium
- Colors: Yellow
- Owner: R. Sivakumar
- CEO: Aditya Meesala
- Head coach: Aravindan Samiappan
- Captain: Tommy Sugiarto
- PBL wins: 1 (2017)

Chennai Superstarz (formerly known as Chennai Smashers) is a franchise badminton team based in Chennai that plays in the Premier Badminton League (PBL). The team has won the PBL title once, has been in the semi-finals of the league twice in their five appearances. They won the 2017 season beating Mumbai Rockets 3–2. The franchise was renamed from Chennai Smashers to Chennai Superstarz in 2020.

== History ==
The team's first season in the PBL was in 2016. Vijay Prabhakaran initially owned the franchise from 2016 to 2019. In December 2019, Sivakumar who owns a regional badminton league named Tamil Nadu Badminton Super League acquired the franchise to become its new owner. The franchise also changed its name into Chennai Superstarz for the 2020 season.

Rio Olympics silver medallist P. V. Sindhu was part of the team for the first three seasons. They won their first and only PBL title in 2017. With P. V. Sindhu in their roster, they defeated Mumbai Rockets 3–2 in the final at New Delhi. During the third and fourth seasons, the team finished sixth. They failed to get past Northeastern Warriors in the semi-finals (-1)–3. The team is currently coached by Aravindan Samiappan.

== Home venue ==
From 2017, the Jawaharlal Nehru Indoor stadium serves as the home for the team. The stadium located in Chennai, has a seating capacity of 5,000. In 2016, there was no home venue for the team due to unavailability of Jawaharlal Nehru Indoor stadium in Chennai and Coimbatore.

== Current squad ==
	Player	Category	Salary	Notes
Coach	(India) Aravindan Samiappan			
Domestic	(India) Satwiksairaj Rankireddy	Men's/Mixed Doubles	₹62 lakh (US$64,000)	
Domestic	(India) B. Sumeeth Reddy	Men's/Mixed Doubles	₹11 lakh (US$11,000)	Retained player
Domestic	(India) Dhruv Kapila	Men's/Mixed Doubles		
Domestic	(India) Sanjana Santosh	Women's/Mixed Doubles	₹2 lakh (US$2,100)	
Domestic	(India) Gayatri Gopichand	Women's Singles	₹2 lakh (US$2,100)	
Domestic	(India) Lakshya Sen	Men's Singles	₹36 lakh (US$37,000)	
Domestic	(India) Sathish Karunakaran	Men's Singles	₹1 lakh (US$1,000)	
Domestic	(India) Sankar Subramanian	Men's Singles	₹1 lakh (US$1,000)	
Overseas	(Indonesia) Tommy Sugiarto	Men's Singles	₹41 lakh (US$43,000)	Captain
Overseas	(Scotland) Kirsty Gilmour	Women's Singles	₹10 lakh (US$10,000)	
Overseas	(England) Jessica Pugh	Women's/Mixed Doubles	₹13 lakh (US$13,000)	Transferred from Mumbai

== Seasons ==
=== Result summary ===
S	Year	Total	RMW	TMW	TML	Pts.	Win %	League standing	Final standing
1	2016	25	10	4	1	17	56%	3rd out of 6	Semi-finalist
2	2017	25	8	5	0	18	52%	1st out of 6	Champions
3	2017–18	25	8	3	2	12	44%	6th out of 8	6th Place
4	2018–19	30	12	3	3	15	50%	6th out of 9	6th Place
5	2020	30	10	6	0	22	53%	3rd out of 7	Semi-finalist
	Total	135	48	21	6	—	51%		

Last updated: 7 February 2020; Source: Official PBL website

=== Season 3 ===
==== Results ====
Date	Venue	Team 1	Result	Team 2	Report
2 Jan	Mumbai	Mumbai Rockets	3-4	Chennai Smashers	
4 Jan	Lucknow	Chennai Smashers	4-3	Delhi Acers	
10 Jan	Hyderabad	Chennai Smashers	4-3	Hyderabad Hunters	
11 Jan	Hyderabad	Awadhe Warriors	4-1	Chennai Smashers	
13 Jan	Bengaluru	Chennai Smashers	4-1	Bengaluru Topguns	
14 Jan (SF)	Bengaluru	Delhi Acers	4-3	Chennai Smashers	

==== Points table ====
Each tie (MP) will have five matches each. Regular Match Win (RMW) = 1 point, Trump Match Win (TMW) = 2 points, Trump Match Lost (TML) = -1 point.

Pos.	Teams	MP	RMW	TMW	TML	Pts.	Qualification
1	Delhi Acers	25	10	5	0	20	Qualified for Semi-finals
2	Awadhe Warriors	25	10	4	1	17	Qualified for Semi-finals
3	Chennai Smashers	25	10	4	1	17	Qualified for Semi-finals
4	Mumbai Rockets	25	9	3	2	13	Qualified for Semi-finals
5	Hyderabad Hunters	25	7	3	2	11	
6	Bengaluru Topguns	25	9	2	3	10	

==== Player statistics ====
Player	Category	P	W	Sets Won	Sets Lost	Win %	MVP
(France) Brice Leverdez	Men's Singles	4	1	2	6	25	0
(Indonesia) Sony Dwi Kuncoro	Men's Singles	3	1	3	5	33.3	0
(Indonesia) Simon Santoso	Men's Singles	3	2	4	4	50	0
(India) P. V. Sindhu	Women's Singles	5	5	9	3	100	2
(India) Krishna Priya	Women's Singles	0	0	0	0	0	0
(India) Pranaav Chopra	Men's/Mixed Doubles	5	1	4	8	20	0
(England) Chris Adcock	Men's/Mixed Doubles	9	5	11	10	56	2
(Canada) Toby Ng	Men's/Mixed Doubles	1	0	0	2	0	0
(India) Sikki Reddy	Women's/Mixed Doubles	0	0	0	0	0	0
(Indonesia) Pia Zebadiah	Women's/Mixed Doubles	5	4	8	4	80	0
Total Matches Played: 5				NA		80	4

=== Season 4 ===
==== Results ====
Date	Venue	Team 1	Result	Team 2
25 Dec	Hyderabad	Hyderabad Hunters	5 – 0	Chennai Smashers
30 Dec	Pune	Ahmedabad Smash Masters	(-1) – 6	Chennai Smashers
3 Jan	Ahmedabad	Pune 7 Aces	3 – 4	Chennai Smashers
7 Jan	Bengaluru	Awadhe Warriors	4 – 3	Chennai Smashers
10 Jan	Bengaluru	Bengaluru Raptors	3 – 2	Chennai Smashers

==== Points table ====
Each tie (MP) will have five matches each. Regular Match Win (RMW) = 1 point, Trump Match Win (TMW) = 2 points, Trump Match Lost (TML) = -1 point.

Team	MP	RMW	RML	TMW	TML	Pts.
Awadhe Warriors	30	13	11	6	0	25
Hyderabad Hunters	30	15	9	5	1	24
Bengaluru Raptors	30	12	12	5	1	21
Mumbai Rockets	30	13	11	4	2	19
Pune 7 Aces	30	8	16	5	1	17
Chennai Smashers	30	12	12	3	3	15
Ahmedabad Smash Masters	30	7	17	4	2	13
North Eastern Warriors	30	11	13	2	4	11
Delhi Dashers	30	9	15	1	5	6

=== Season 5 ===
==== Points table ====
Rank	Team	MP	RMW	RML	TMW	TML	Pts.
1	Northeastern Warriors	30	13	11	5	1	22
2	Bengaluru Raptors (C)	30	13	11	5	1	22
3	Chennai Superstarz	30	10	14	6	0	22
4	Pune 7 Aces	30	14	10	4	2	20
5	Awadhe Warriors	30	11	13	3	3	14
6	Hyderabad Hunters	30	11	13	2	4	11
7	Mumbai Rockets	30	4	20	4	2	10

- Qualified for knockouts
- Five matches (MP) constitute one tie
- Each team will play six ties
- 1 point for each Regular Match Won (RMW)
- 0 points for Regular Matches Lost (RML)
- 2 points for each Trump Match Won (TMW)
- -1 point for each Trump Match Lost (TML)

Source: Official PBL website

==== Results ====
Date	Venue	Home	Results	Away
20 January	Chennai	Chennai Superstarz	5–2	Hyderabad Hunters
22 January	Chennai	Chennai Superstarz	4–3	Mumbai Rockets
24 January	Chennai	Chennai Superstarz	4–3	Bengaluru Raptors
30 January	Hyderabad	Pune 7 Aces	5–2	Chennai Superstarz
1 February	Hyderabad	Awadhe Warriors	3–4	Chennai Superstarz
4 February	Hyderabad	Northeastern Warriors	4–3	Chennai Superstarz

==== Semifinal ====
Date	Venue	Home	Results	Away
7 February	Hyderabad	Chennai Superstarz	(-1) – 3	Northeastern Warriors

==== Player statistics ====
Player	Category	P	W	Sets Won	Sets Lost	Win %	MVP
(India) Lakshya Sen	Men's Singles	5	4	9	3	80%	1
(India) K. Sathish Kumar	Men's Singles	2	0	0	4	0%	0
(India) Sankar Muthusamy	Men's Singles	1	0	0	2	0%	0
(Indonesia) Tommy Sugiarto	Men's Singles	4	4	8	2	100%	2
(India) Gayatri Gopichand	Women's Singles	4	0	2	8	0%	0
(Scotland) Kirsty Gilmour	Women's Singles	2	2	4	0	100%	0
(India) Satwiksairaj Rankireddy	Men's/Mixed Doubles	7	4	9	10	57%	1
(India) B. Sumeeth Reddy	Men's/Mixed Doubles	4	2	4	5	50%	1
(India) Dhruv Kapila	Men's/Mixed Doubles	7	3	7	9	43%	1
(India) Sanjana Santosh	Women's/Mixed Doubles	1	0	0	2	0%	0
(England) Jessica Pugh	Women's/Mixed Doubles	5	3	6	6	60%	1
Total Matches Played: 30				NA			

Last updated: 5 February 2020; Source: Official PBL website

Chennai Superstarz finished third in the league stage with 22 points qualifying for the semifinals. They won all of their trump matches becoming the only team in the season to do so. They lost to Northeastern Warriors in the semifinal. This was their second PBL semifinal loss in five appearances.

== Former squads ==
Year (S)	2018-19 (4)	2017-18 (3)	2017 (2)	2016 (1)
Domestic	(India) Vijaydeep Singh			
Domestic	(India) Sumeeth Reddy	**(India) P. V. Sindhu**	**(India) P. V. Sindhu**	**(India) P. V. Sindhu**
Domestic	(India) Rutaparna Panda	(India) Aditya Joshi	(India) Arundhati Pantawane	(India) Krishna Priya
Domestic	(India) Saili Rane	(India) B. Sumeeth Reddy	(India) Parupalli Kashyap	(India) Pranaav Chopra
Domestic	(India) Saili Rane	(India) Daniel Farid	(India) Ramya Tulasi	(India) Sikki Reddy
Domestic	(India) Parupalli Kashyap	(India) Vrushali Gummadi	(India) B. Sumeeth Reddy	
Overseas	**(England) Chris Adcock**	(England) Chris Adcock	(England) Chris Adcock	(England) Chris Adcock
Overseas	(England) Gabby Adcock	(France) Brice Leverdez	(Indonesia) Tommy Sugiarto	(France) Brice Leverdez
Overseas	(Hong Kong) Or Chin Chung	(England) Gabby Adcock	(England) Gabby Adcock	(Indonesia) Sony Dwi Kuncoro
Overseas	(England) Rajiv Ouseph	(Thailand) Tanongsak Saensomboonsuk	(Thailand) Tanongsak Saensomboonsuk	(Indonesia) Simon Santoso
Overseas	(South Korea) Sung Ji-hyun	(Taiwan) Lee Yang	(Denmark) Mads Pieler Kolding	(Canada) Toby Ng
Overseas	(Malaysia) Chong Wei Feng			(Indonesia) Pia Zebadiah

- Team captains listed in **bold**.
