= 2016 Premier Badminton League =

Tournament details
- Dates: 2 January – 17 January
- Edition: 1
- Total prize money: US$1,000,000
- Location: India
- Official website: www.pbl-india.com

Results
- Champions: Delhi Dashers
- Runners-up: Mumbai Rockets
- Semi-finalists: Awadhe Warriors, Chennai Smashers

2016 Premier Badminton League (also known as Star Sports Premier Badminton League 2016 for sponsorship reasons) was the first edition of the Premier Badminton League. The season was held from 2–17 January 2016. The opening ceremony was held in Mumbai and the Finals in Delhi. Delhi Dashers (formerly Delhi Acers) became the champions after beating Mumbai Rockets in the final.

Bollywood actor Akshay Kumar was brand ambassador of the league.

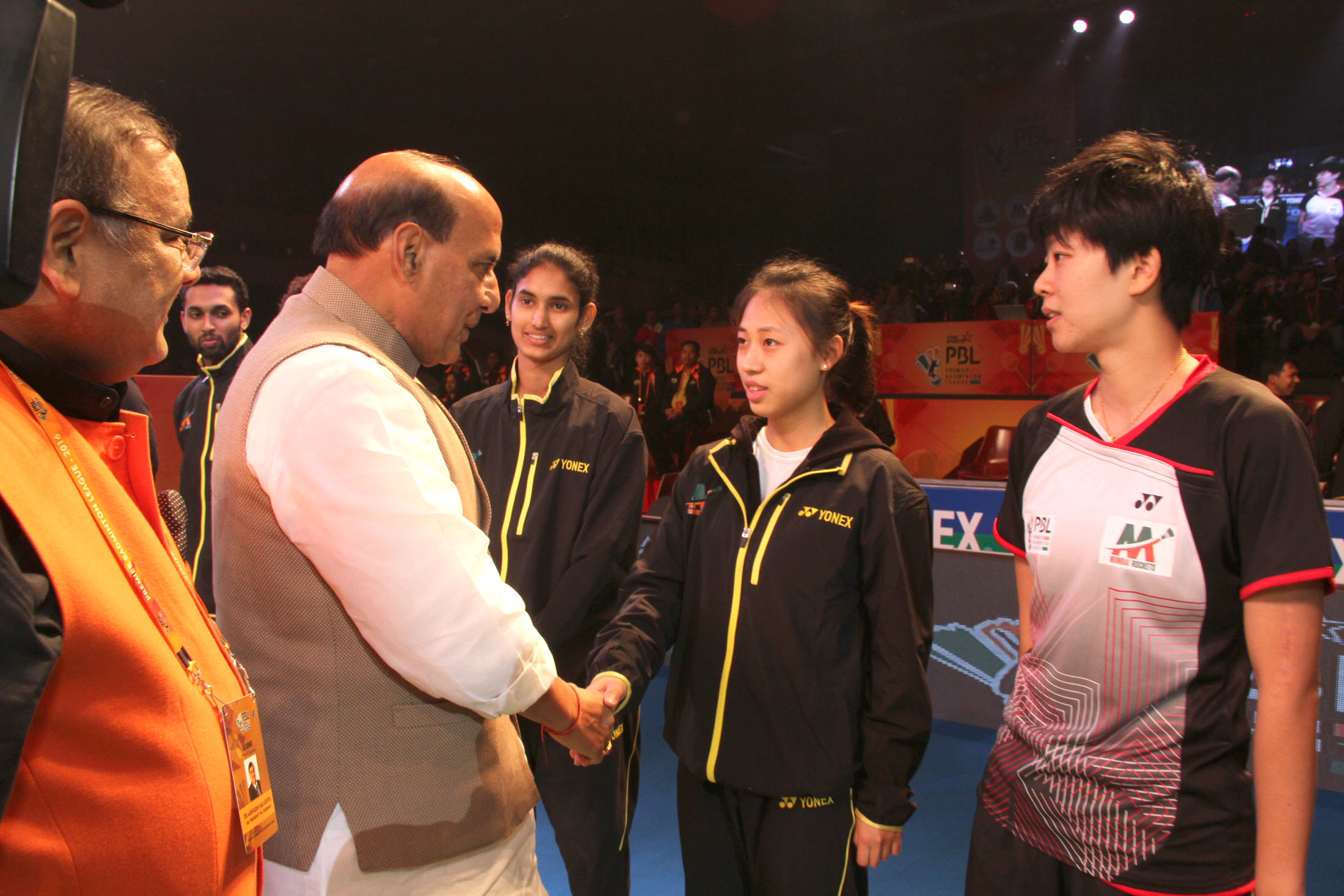
The Union Home Minister, Rajnath Singh being introduced to the players during the final day of the PBL 2016, in New Delhi.

Delhi Dashers (formerly Delhi Acers) won the title by defeating Mumbai Rockets 4–3.

== Teams ==
Six teams participated in the season:

Locations of PBL teams
1. Awadhe Warriors
2. Bengaluru Topguns
3. Chennai Smashers
4. Delhi Dashers (formerly Delhi Acers)
5. Hyderabad Hunters
6. Mumbai Rockets

=== Delhi Dashers (formerly Delhi Acers) ===
Player	Category	P	W	Set Won	Set Lost	Win %	MVP
(India) Ajay Jayaram	Men's Singles	2	2	4	0	100	0
(England) Rajiv Ouseph	Men's Singles	3	3	6	1	100	1
(Indonesia) Tommy Sugiarto	Men's Singles	3	3	6	1	100	3
(India) P. C. Thulasi	Women's Singles	3	1	3	5	33.3	0
(India) Shikha Gautam	Women's Singles	1	0	0	2	0	0
(India) Akshay Dewalkar	Men's/Mixed Doubles	2	0	0	4	0	0
(Malaysia) Koo Keat Kien	Men's/Mixed Doubles	6	4	9	6	66.6	0
(Malaysia) Tan Boon Heong	Men's/Mixed Doubles	4	3	6	3	75	0
(India) Aparna Balan	Women's/Mixed Doubles	1	0	0	2	0	0
(England) Gabrielle Adcock	Women's/Mixed Doubles	3	1	4	5	33.3	0
Total Matches Played: 5				NA		60	4

=== Mumbai Rockets ===
Player	Category	P	W	Set Won	Set Lost	Win %	MVP
(India) H. S. Prannoy	Men's Singles	4	2	5	4	50	1
(India) Gurusai Dutt	Men's Singles	4	2	4	5	50	0
(India) Ruthvika Gadde	Women's Singles	2	1	3	2	50	0
(China) Han Li	Women's Singles	1	0	1	2	0	1
(China) Liu Zi Die	Women's Singles	1	0	1	2	0	0
(India) Manu Attri	Men's/Mixed Doubles	0	0	0	0	0	0
(Singapore) Chayut T	Men's/Mixed Doubles	1	0	0	2	0	0
(Russia) Vladimir Ivanov	Men's/Mixed Doubles	7	4	7	8	28	1
(Denmark) Mathias Boe	Men's/Mixed Doubles	2	2	3	2	100	0
(Denmark) Kamilla Juhl	Women's/Mixed Doubles	4	2	6	4	50	0
Total Matches Played: 5				NA		60	3

=== Chennai Smashers ===
Player	Category	P loss→	Set Lost	Win %	MVP		
(France) Brice Leverdez	Men's Singles	4	1	2	6	25	0
(Indonesia) Sony Dwi Kuncoro	Men's Singles	3	1	3	5	33.3	0
(Indonesia) Simon Santoso	Men's Singles	3	2	4	4	50	0
(India) P. V. Sindhu	Women's Singles	5	5	9	3	100	2
(India) Krishna Priya	Women's Singles	0	0	0	0	0	0
(India) Pranaav Chopra	Men's/Mixed Doubles	5	1	4	8	20	0
(England) Chris Adcock	Men's/Mixed Doubles	9	5	11	10	56	2
(Canada) Toby Ng	Men's/Mixed Doubles	1	0	0	2	0	0
(India) Sikki Reddy	Women's/Mixed Doubles	0	0	0	0	0	0
(Indonesia) Pia Zebadiah	Women's/Mixed Doubles	5	4	8	4	80	0
Total Matches Played: 5				NA		80	4

=== Hyderabad Hunters ===
Player	Category	P	W	Set Won	Set Lost	Win %	MVP
(Malaysia) Lee Chong Wei	Men's Singles	4	2	6	5	50	1
(India) P. Kashyap	Men's Singles	7	1	3	12	14	0
(India) Siril Verma	Men's Singles	1	0	0	2	0	0
(Thailand) Supanida K.	Women's Singles	7	3	8	11	43	0
(Spain) Carolina Marin	Women's Singles	43	35	70	11	82	0
(India) K. Nandagopal	Men's/Mixed Doubles	1	0	1	2	0	0
(India) R.S. Sai Raj	Men's/Mixed Doubles	1	0	1	2	0	0
(Indonesia) Markis Kido	Men's/Mixed Doubles	9	6	12	9	67	0
(Denmark) Carsten Mogensen	Men's/Mixed Doubles	8	5	6	5	63	0
(India) Jwala Gutta	Women's/Mixed Doubles	5	2	4	8	40	0
(India) Meghana J.	Women's/Mixed Doubles	0	0	0	0	0	0
Total Matches played: 5				NA		20	1

=== Bengaluru Topguns ===
Player	Category	P	W	Set Won	Set Lost	Win %	MVP
(India) Anand Pawar	Men's Singles	1	0	2	0	0	0
(India) Sameer Verma	Men's Singles	4	1	3	6	25	0
(India) K. Srikanth	Men's Singles	5	3	7	5	60	2
(China) Suo Di	Women's Singles	5	3	8	3	60	0
(India) B. S. Reddy	Men's/Mixed Doubles	0	0	0	0	0	0
(Malaysia) Khim Wah Lim	Men's/Mixed Doubles	5	0	3	10	0	0
(Malaysia) Hoon Thien How	Men's/Mixed Doubles	6	2	6	9	33.3	0
(Denmark) Joachim Nielsen	Men's/Mixed Doubles	3	2	4	2	66.6	0
(Scotland) Robert Blair	Men's/Mixed Doubles	1	0	1	2	0	0
(India) Ashwini Ponnappa	Women's/Mixed Doubles	5	2	6	7	40	0
Total Matches Played: 5				NA		0	2

=== Awadhe Warriors ===
Player	Category	P	W	Set Won	Set Lost	Win %	MVP
(India) Sai Praneeth	Men's Singles	5	3	7	5	60	0
(India) Sourabh Verma	Men's Singles	0	0	0	0	0	0
(Thailand) Tanongsak S	Men's Singles	5	2	4	7	40	2
(India) Saina Nehwal	Women's Singles	2	2	4	0	100	0
(India) Vrushali Gummadi	Women's Singles	3	1	2	4	33.3	0
(China) Cai Yun	Men's/Mixed Doubles	5	4	8	2	80	0
(Indonesia) Hendra Aprida Gunawan	Men's/Mixed Doubles	3	1	3	4	33.3	0
(Thailand) Bodin Isara	Men's/Mixed Doubles	6	5	11	3	83	2
(India) K. Maneesha	Women's/Mixed Doubles	2	0	2	4	0	0
(Denmark) Christinna P.	Women's/Mixed Doubles	3	2	5	3	66.6	1
Total Matches Played: 5				NA		66.6	5

== Schedule ==
The following is the schedule for 2016 Premier Badminton League. A total of 15 league matches, two semifinal, and 1 final match were played.

Date	Venue	Team 1	Result	Team 2	Report
2 Jan	Mumbai	Mumbai Rockets	2-1	Awadhe Warriors	
3 Jan	Mumbai	Hyderabad Hunters	3-2	Bengaluru Topguns	
3 Jan	Mumbai	Mumbai Rockets	3-4	Chennai Smashers	
4 Jan	Lucknow	Awadhe Warriors	4-3	Delhi Dashers (formerly Delhi Acers)	
5 Jan	Lucknow	Chennai Smashers	4-3	Delhi Dashers (formerly Delhi Acers)	
5 Jan	Lucknow	Mumbai Rockets	4-3	Bengaluru Topguns	
6 Jan	Lucknow	Awadhe Warriors	4-1	Bengaluru Topguns	
7 Jan	New Delhi	Delhi Acers	4-1	Hyderabad Hunters	
8 Jan	New Delhi	Delhi Dashers (formerly Delhi Acers)	5-2	Bengaluru Topguns	
9 Jan	Hyderabad	Awadhe Warriors	4-3	Hyderabad Hunters	
10 Jan	Hyderabad	Chennai Smashers	4-3	Hyderabad Hunters	
11 Jan	Hyderabad	Mumbai Rockets	4-1	Hyderabad Hunters	
11 Jan	Hyderabad	Awadhe Warriors	4-1	Chennai Smashers	
13 Jan	Bengaluru	Mumbai Rockets	0-5	Delhi Dashers (formerly Delhi Acers)	
13 Jan	Bengaluru	Chennai Smashers	4-1	Bengaluru Topguns	
Semifinals
14 Jan	Bengaluru	Delhi Dashers (formerly Delhi Acers)	4-3	Chennai Smashers	
15 Jan	Hyderabad	Awadhe Warriors	1-3	Mumbai Rockets	
Final
17 Jan	New Delhi	Mumbai Rockets	3-4	Delhi Dashers (formerly Delhi Acers)	

=== Knockout stage ===
Semi-finals
14 January, 18:30 – Bangalore
Delhi Dashers (formerly Delhi Acers)	4
Chennai Smashers	3
15 January, 18:30 – Hyderabad
Awadhe Warriors	1
Mumbai Rockets	3

Final
17 January, 18:30 – New Delhi
Delhi Dashers (formerly Delhi Acers)	4
Mumbai Rockets	3

== Points Table ==
Each tie (MP) will have five matches each. Regular Match Win (RMW) = 1 point, Trump Match Win (TMW) = 2 points, Trump Match Lost (TML) = -1 point.

Pos.	Teams	MP	RMW	TMW	TML	Pts.	Qualification
1	Delhi Dashers (formerly Delhi Acers)	25	10	5	0	20	Qualified for Semi-finals
2	Awadhe Warriors	25	10	4	1	17	Qualified for Semi-finals
3	Chennai Smashers	25	10	4	1	17	Qualified for Semi-finals
4	Mumbai Rockets	25	9	3	2	13	Qualified for Semi-finals
5	Hyderabad Hunters	25	7	3	2	11	
6	Bengaluru Topguns	25	9	2	3	10	

== Player statistics ==
	Most Valuable Player (MVP)		Fastest Smasher of the Day (M)		Fastest Smasher of the Day (F)	
Date	Player	Team	Player	Team	Player	Team
2 Jan	(Thailand) S Tanongsak	Awadhe Warriors	(India) Gurusai Dutt	Mumbai Rockets	(India) Ruthvika Gadde	Mumbai Rockets
3 Jan	(India) K Srikanth	Bengaluru Topguns	(Malaysia) Khim Wah Lim	Bengaluru Topguns	(India) Jwala Gutta	Hyderabad Hunters
3 Jan	(India) P V Sindhu	Chennai Smashers	(India) Prannav Chopra	Chennai Smashers	(India) P V Sindhu	Chennai Smashers
4 Jan	(Thailand) Bodin Isara	Awadhe Warriors	(Thailand) S Tanongsak	Awadhe Warriors	(India) Saina Nehwal	Awadhe Warriors
5 Jan	(England) Chris Adcock	Chennai Smashers	(Malaysia) Koo Keat Kien	Delhi Dashers (formerly Delhi Acers)	(India) P V Sindhu	Chennai Smashers
5 Jan	(Russia) Vladimir Ivanov	Mumbai Rockets	(Russia) Vladimir Ivanov	Mumbai Rockets	(China) Suo Di	Bengaluru Topguns
5 Jan	(India) K Srikanth	Bengaluru Topguns	(Russia) Vladimir Ivanov	Mumbai Rockets	(China) Suo Di	Bengaluru Topguns
6 Jan	(Thailand) S Tanongsak	Awadhe Warriors	(Thailand) Bodin Isara	Awadhe Warriors	(India) Saina Nehwal	Awadhe Warriors
7 Jan	(Indonesia) Tommy Sugiarto	Delhi Dashers (formerly Delhi Acers)	(India) K. Nandagopal	Hyderabad Hunters	(Thailand) Supanida Katethong	Hyderabad Hunters
8 Jan	(England) Rajiv Ouseph	Delhi Dashers (formerly Delhi Acers)	(Malaysia) Koo Keat Kien	Delhi Dashers (formerly Delhi Acers)	(England) Gabrielle Adcock	Delhi Dashers (formerly Delhi Acers)
9 Jan	(Malaysia) Lee Chong Wei	Hyderabad Hunters	(Denmark) Carsten Mogensen	Hyderabad Hunters	(India) Jwala Gutta	Hyderabad Hunters
10 Jan	(England) Chris Adcock	Chennai Smashers	(India) P. Kashyap	Hyderabad Hunters	(Thailand) Supanida Katethong	Hyderabad Hunters
11 Jan	(Thailand) Bodin Isara	Awadhe Warriors	(Indonesia) Hendra Aprida Gunawan	Awadhe Warriors	(India) P V Sindhu	Chennai Smashers
11 Jan	(Denmark) Christinna P.	Awadhe Warriors	(Indonesia) Hendra Aprida Gunawan	Awadhe Warriors	(India) P V Sindhu	Chennai Smashers
11 Jan	(India) H. S. Prannoy	Mumbai Rockets	(Russia) Vladimir Ivanov	Mumbai Rockets	(Denmark) Kamilla Juhl	Mumbai Rockets
13 Jan	(India) P V Sindhu	Chennai Smashers	(India) Prannav Chopra	Chennai Smashers	(India) Ashwini Ponnappa	Bengaluru Topguns
13 Jan	(Indonesia) Tommy Sugiarto	Delhi Dashers (formerly Delhi Acers)	(India) H. S. Prannoy	Mumbai Rockets	(India) Ruthvika Gadde	Mumbai Rockets
SF1	(Indonesia) Tommy Sugiarto	Delhi Dashers (formerly Delhi Acers)	(France) Brice Leverdez	Chennai Smashers	(India) P V Sindhu	Chennai Smashers
SF2	(China) Han Li	Mumbai Rockets	(Thailand) Bodin Isara	Awadhe Warriors	(India) Saina Nehwal	Awadhe Warriors
SF2	(China) Han Li	Mumbai Rockets	(Thailand) S Tanongsak	Awadhe Warriors	(India) Saina Nehwal	Awadhe Warriors
Final						

=== End of the Season Award ===
Award	Player/Team
Fastest Smash of the Tournament (M)	(Russia) Vladimir Ivanov (450 km/h)
Fastest Smash of the Tournament (F)	(India) Saina Nehwal (361 km/h)
Longest Rally of the Tournament	(Malaysia) Koo Keat Kien/ (Malaysia) Tan Boon Heong (91 shots)
Most Vibrant Team	Delhi
MVP of the Tournament (M)	(Indonesia) Tommy Sugiarto
MVP of the Tournament (F)	(India) P. V. Sindhu
