= Hyderabad HotShots =

Hyderabad Hotshots
- Sport: Badminton
- Founded: 2013
- Folded: 2015
- Based in: Hyderabad, Telangana
- Home ground: Gachibowli Indoor Stadium, Hyderabad
- Owner: PVP Ventures
- Head coach: Jakkampudi Rajendra Kumar
- Captain: Saina Nehwal
- IBL wins: Winners of IBL 2013
- Website: www.hyderabadhotshots.com

Hyderabad Hotshots was a badminton franchise team representing the city of Hyderabad in the Indian Badminton League(IBL). The team was one of the six franchises in the inaugural IBL 2013. The franchise was owned by Andhra Pradesh's multi business group PVP Ventures. The primary home ground of Hyderabad Hotshots was Gachibowli Indoor Stadium in Hyderabad. Hyderabad Hotshots was captained by Indian shuttler Saina Nehwal and coached by Rajendra.

== Franchise history ==
Badminton Association of India(BAI) announced a franchise league known as "Indian Badminton League" with six franchises representing six Indian cities. PVP Ventures chairman, Prasad V Potluri, was the first to bid for Hyderabad Hotshots and also to own one of the first franchises announced by IBL. The first season player auctions were held on 22 July 2013. Player auctions were held in Delhi and the Hyderabad Hotshots bid of $120,000 for player Saina Nehwal was successful. Nehwal was the highest paid female shuttler and second highest paid shuttler overall in the tournament behind World No. 1 Lee Chong Wei of Malaysia with a bid of $135,000 by Mumbai Masters.

The franchise has been terminated and got replaced by Hyderabad Hunters in 2016 PBL.

== Squad ==
=== Indian players ===
- (India) Saina Nehwal (WS)
- (India) Shubhankar Dey (MD)
- (India) Tarun Kona (XD)
- (India) Ajay Jayaram (MS)
- (India) Kanthi Visalakshi (WS)
- (India) Pradnya Gadre (XD)
- (India) Rahul C Yadav (MD)

=== Foreign players ===
- (Indonesia) Taufik Hidayat (MS)
- (Thailand) Tanongsak Saensomboonsuk (MS)
- (Malaysia) Goh V Shem (MD)
- (Malaysia) Lim Khim Wah (MD)

=== Support staff ===
- Jakkampudi Rajendra Kumar (Coach)
- Anil Kumar N (Asst. Coach)
- Kiran C (Physio)
- P V Sarada (Team Manager)

== 2013 season statistics ==
Location	Date and Time	Winning Team	Scores	Losing Team	Match Type

Delhi	15 August, 16:00	Hyderabad Hotshots	3 – 2	Awadhe Warriors	League Match

Lucknow	17 August, 16:00	Delhi Smashers	3 – 2	Hyderabad Hotshots	League Match

Mumbai	19 August, 20:00	Hyderabad Hotshots	4 – 1	Pune Pistons	League Match

Pune	22 August, 16:00	Hyderabad Hotshots	3 – 2	Mumbai Masters	League Match

Hyderabad	27 August, 20:00	Banga Beats	3 – 2	Hyderabad Hotshots	League Match

=== Semi-final ===
Hyderabad Hotshots qualified for semi-final after scoring 17 points from the league matches. The semi-final was held at their home ground Gachibowli Indoor Stadium in Hyderabad on 28 August 2013. Hyderabad Hotshots faced Pune Pistons in the semi-final.

Location	Date and Time	Winning Team	Scores	Losing Team	Match Type

Hyderabad	28 August, 20:00	Hyderabad Hotshots	3 – 0	Pune Pistons	Semi-Final

- Ajay Jayram (HH) beat Tien Minh Nguyen (PP) by 21–17, 21–11.
- Saina Nehawal (HH) beat Schenk Juliane (PP) by 21–10, 19–21, 11–8.
- Goh V Shem & Wah Lim Khim (HH) beat Fischer Nielsen Joachim & Sanave Thomas (PP) by 16–21, 21–14, 11–7

=== Final ===
Hyderabad Hotshots qualified for final after defeating Pune Pistons in semi-finals. The final was held at National Sports Club of India, Mumbai on 31 August 2013. Hyderabad Hotshots faced Awadhe Warriors in the final.

Location	Date and Time	Winning Team	Scores	Losing Team	Match Type

Mumbai	31 August, 20:00	Hyderabad HotShots	3 – 1	Awadhe Warriors	Final

- K Srikanth (AW) beat S Tanongsak (HH) by 21–12, 21–20.
- Saina Nehwal (HH) beat P V Sindhu (AW) by 21–15, 21–7.
- Goh V Shem & Wah Lim Khim (HH) beat Markis Kido & Mathias Boe (AW) by 21–14, 13–21, 11–4.
- Ajay Jayaram (HH) beat R M V Guru Sai Dutt (AW) by 10–21, 21–17, 11–7.
