= 2019 in badminton =

== International badminton events (Grade 1) ==
- May 19 – 26: 2019 Sudirman Cup in Nanning
  - China defeated Japan, 3–0 in matches played, to win their 11th Sudirman Cup title.
- August 4 – 11: 2019 BWF Seniors World Championships in (Poland) Katowice
  - For results, click here.
- August 19 – 25: 2019 BWF World Championships in (Switzerland) Basel
  - Singles: (Japan) Kento Momota (m) / (India) P. V. Sindhu (f)
  - Doubles: Indonesia (Mohammad Ahsan & Hendra Setiawan) (m) / Japan (Mayu Matsumoto & Wakana Nagahara) (f)
  - Mixed: China (Zheng Siwei & Huang Yaqiong)
- December 11 – 15: 2019 BWF World Tour Finals in (China) Guangzhou

== Continental badminton events ==
- February 11 – 17: 2019 Oceania Badminton Championships (Senior, Junior, & Mixed Teams) in Melbourne
  - Senior:
  - Singles: (New Zealand) Oscar Guo (m) / (Australia) Chen Hsuan-yu (f)
  - Doubles: Australia (Sawan Serasinghe & Eric Vuong) (m) / Australia (Setyana Mapasa & Gronya Somerville) (f)
  - Mixed: Australia (Simon Leung & Gronya Somerville)
  - Junior
  - Singles: (New Zealand) Edward Lau (m) / (New Zealand) Shaunna Li (f)
  - Doubles: New Zealand (Ryan Tong & Jack Wang) (m) / Australia (Kaitlyn Ea & Angela Yu) (f)
  - Mixed: Australia (Jack Yu & Angela Yu)
  - Senior Mixed Team: 1. Australia; 2. New Zealand, 3. New Caledonia, 4. French Polynesia
  - Junior Mixed Team: 1. Australia; 2. New Zealand, 3. Tahiti, 4. New Caledonia
- February 13 – 17: 2019 European Mixed Team Badminton Championships in Copenhagen
  - Champions: Denmark, 2. Germany, Semi-final losers: Netherlands and Russia
- February 14 – 17: 2019 Pan Am Mixed Team Badminton Championships in (Peru) Lima
  - Champions: Canada, 2. United States, 3. Brazil, 4. Cuba
- March 19 – 24: Badminton Asia Mixed Team Championships 2019 in Hong Kong
  - Champions: China, 2. Japan, 3/4. Hong Kong & Indonesia
- April 22 – 28: 2019 African Badminton Championships in Port Harcourt
  - Singles: (Nigeria) Anuoluwapo Juwon Opeyor (m) / (Nigeria) Dorcas Ajoke Adesokan (f)
  - Doubles: Algeria (Koceila Mammeri & Youcef Sabri Medel) (m) / Nigeria (Dorcas Ajoke Adesokan & Uchechukwu Deborah Ukeh) (f)
  - Mixed: Algeria (Koceila Mammeri & Linda Mazri)
  - Team Champions: Nigeria
- April 23 – 28: 2019 Badminton Asia Championships in Hannan District (Wuhan)
  - Singles: (Japan) Kento Momota (m) / (Japan) Akane Yamaguchi (f)
  - Doubles: Japan (Hiroyuki Endo & Yuta Watanabe) (m) / China (Chen Qingchen & Jia Yifan) (f)
  - Mixed: China (Wang Yilyu & Huang Dongping)
- April 25 – 28: 2019 Pan Am Badminton Championships in (Mexico) Aguascalientes City
  - Singles: (Cuba) Osleni Guerrero (m) / (Canada) Michelle Li (f)
  - Doubles: Canada (Jason Ho-shue & Nyl Yakura) (m) / Canada (Rachel Honderich & Kristen Tsai) (f)
  - Mixed: Canada (Joshua Hurlburt-Yu & Josephine Wu)
- July 16 – 20: 2019 Pan Am Junior Badminton Championships in Moncton
  - Singles: (Canada) Brian Yang (m) / (United States) Natalie Chi (f)
  - Doubles: Canada (Jonathan Shou-Zheng Chien & Brian Yang) (m) / Canada (Crystal Lai & ZHANG Wenyu) (f)
  - Mixed: Canada (Jonathan Shou-Zheng Chien & Crystal Lai)
- July 20 – 28: Badminton Asia Junior Championships 2019 (Individual & Team) in Suzhou
  - Singles: (Thailand) Kunlavut Vitidsarn (m) / (China) ZHOU Meng (f)
  - Doubles: Indonesia (Leo Rolly Carnando & Daniel Marthin) (m) / China (LI Yijing & LUO Xumin) (f)
  - Mixed: Indonesia (Leo Rolly Carnando & Indah Cahya Sari Jamil)
  - Mixed Team: Thailand

== 2019 BWF Season (Grade 2) ==
- January 8 – December 15: 2019 BWF Season

Level Two (Super 1000)

- March 5 – 10: 2019 All England Open in Birmingham
  - Singles: (Japan) Kento Momota (m) / (China) Chen Yufei (f)
  - Doubles: Indonesia (Mohammad Ahsan & Hendra Setiawan) (m) / China (Chen Qingchen & Jia Yifan) (f)
  - Mixed: China (Zheng Siwei & Huang Yaqiong)
- July 16 – 21: 2019 Indonesia Open in Jakarta
  - Singles: (Chinese Taipei) Chou Tien-chen (m) / (Japan) Akane Yamaguchi (f)
  - Doubles: Indonesia (Marcus Fernaldi Gideon & Kevin Sanjaya Sukamuljo) (m) / Japan (Yuki Fukushima & Sayaka Hirota) (f)
  - Mixed: China (Zheng Siwei & Huang Yaqiong)
- September 17 – 22: China Open 2019 in Changzhou
  - Singles: (Japan) Kento Momota (m) / (Spain) Carolina Marín (f)
  - Doubles: Indonesia (Marcus Fernaldi Gideon & Kevin Sanjaya Sukamuljo) (m) / China (Chen Qingchen & Jia Yifan) (f)
  - Mixed: China (Zheng Siwei & Huang Yaqiong)

Level Three (Super 750)

- April 2 – 7: 2019 Malaysia Open in Kuala Lumpur
  - Singles: (China) Lin Dan (m) / (Chinese Taipei) Tai Tzu-ying (f)
  - Doubles: China (Li Junhui & Liu Yuchen) (m) / China (Chen Qingchen & Jia Yifan) (f)
  - Mixed: China (Zheng Siwei & Huang Yaqiong)
- July 23 – 28: Japan Open 2019 in Tokyo
  - Singles: (Japan) Kento Momota (m) / (Japan) Akane Yamaguchi (f)
  - Doubles: Indonesia (Marcus Fernaldi Gideon & Kevin Sanjaya Sukamuljo) (m) / South Korea (Kim So-yeong & Kong Hee-yong) (f)
  - Mixed: China (Wang Yilyu & Huang Dongping)
- October 15 – 20: 2019 Denmark Open in Odense
  - Singles: (Japan) Kento Momota (m) / (Chinese Taipei) Tai Tzu-ying (f)
  - Doubles: Indonesia (Marcus Fernaldi Gideon & Kevin Sanjaya Sukamuljo) (m) / South Korea (Baek Ha-na & Jung Kyung-eun) (f)
  - Mixed: Indonesia (Praveen Jordan & Melati Daeva Oktavianti)
- October 22 – 27: 2019 French Open in (France) Paris
  - Singles: (China) Chen Long (m) / (South Korea) An Se-young (f)
  - Doubles: Indonesia (Marcus Fernaldi Gideon & Kevin Sanjaya Sukamuljo) (m) / South Korea (Lee So-hee & Shin Seung-chan) (f)
  - Mixed: Indonesia (Praveen Jordan & Melati Daeva Oktavianti)
- November 5 – 10: Fuzhou China Open 2019 in Fuzhou
  - Singles: (Japan) Kento Momota (m) / (China) Chen Yufei (f)
  - Doubles: Indonesia (Marcus Fernaldi Gideon & Kevin Sanjaya Sukamuljo) (m) / Japan (Yuki Fukushima & Sayaka Hirota) (f)
  - Mixed: China (Wang Yilyu & Huang Dongping)

Level Four (Super 500)

- January 15 – 20: 2019 Malaysia Masters in Kuala Lumpur
  - Singles: (South Korea) Son Wan-ho (m) / (Thailand) Ratchanok Intanon (f)
  - Doubles: Indonesia (Marcus Fernaldi Gideon & Kevin Sanjaya Sukamuljo) (m) / Japan (Yuki Fukushima & Sayaka Hirota) (f)
  - Mixed: Japan (Yuta Watanabe & Arisa Higashino)
- January 22 – 27: 2019 Indonesia Masters in Jakarta
  - Singles: (Denmark) Anders Antonsen (m) / (India) Saina Nehwal (f)
  - Doubles: Indonesia (Marcus Fernaldi Gideon & Kevin Sanjaya Sukamuljo) (m) / Japan (Misaki Matsutomo & Ayaka Takahashi) (f)
  - Mixed: China (Zheng Siwei & Huang Yaqiong)
- March 26 – 31: 2019 India Open in New Delhi
  - Singles: (Denmark) Viktor Axelsen (m) / (Thailand) Ratchanok Intanon (f)
  - Doubles: Chinese Taipei (Lee Yang & Wang Chi-lin) (m) / Indonesia (Greysia Polii & Apriyani Rahayu) (f)
  - Mixed: China (Wang Yilyu & Huang Dongping)
- April 9 – 14: 2019 Singapore Open in Singapore
  - Singles: (Japan) Kento Momota (m) / (Chinese Taipei) Tai Tzu-ying (f)
  - Doubles: Japan (Takeshi Kamura & Keigo Sonoda) (m) / Japan (Mayu Matsumoto & Wakana Nagahara) (f)
  - Mixed: Thailand (Dechapol Puavaranukroh & Sapsiree Taerattanachai)
- July 30 – August 4: 2019 Thailand Open in Bangkok
  - Singles: (Chinese Taipei) Chou Tien-chen (m) / (China) Chen Yufei (f)
  - Doubles: India (Satwiksairaj Rankireddy & Chirag Shetty) (m) / Japan (Shiho Tanaka & Koharu Yonemoto) (f)
  - Mixed: China (Wang Yilyu & Huang Dongping)
- September 24 – 29: 2019 Korea Open in Seoul
  - Singles: (Japan) Kento Momota (m) / (China) He Bingjiao (f)
  - Doubles: Indonesia (Fajar Alfian & Muhammad Rian Ardianto) (m) / South Korea (Kim So-yeong & Kong Hee-yong) (f)
  - Mixed: Thailand (Dechapol Puavaranukroh & Sapsiree Taerattanachai)
- November 12 – 17: Hong Kong Open 2019 in Hong Kong
  - Singles: (m) / (f)
  - Doubles: (m) / (f)
  - Mixed:

Level Five (Super 300)

- January 8 – 13: 2019 Thailand Masters in Bangkok
  - Singles: (Singapore) Loh Kean Yew (m) / (Indonesia) Fitriani (f)
  - Doubles: Malaysia (Goh V Shem & Tan Wee Kiong) (m) / Thailand (Puttita Supajirakul & Sapsiree Taerattanachai) (f)
  - Mixed: Malaysia (Chan Peng Soon & Goh Liu Ying)
- February 19 – 24: 2019 Spain Masters in Barcelona
  - Singles: (Denmark) Viktor Axelsen (m) / (Denmark) Mia Blichfeldt (f)
  - Doubles: Chinese Taipei (Lee Yang & Wang Chi-lin) (m) / South Korea (Kim So-yeong & Kong Hee-yong) (f)
  - Mixed: South Korea (Seo Seung-jae & Chae Yoo-jung)
- February 26 – March 3: 2019 German Open in (Germany) Mülheim
  - Singles: (Japan) Kento Momota (m) / (Japan) Akane Yamaguchi (f)
  - Doubles: Japan (Hiroyuki Endo & Yuta Watanabe) (m) / China (Du Yue & Li Yinhui) (f)
  - Mixed: South Korea (Seo Seung-jae & Chae Yoo-jung)
- March 12 – 17: 2019 Swiss Open in (Switzerland) Basel
  - Singles: (China) Shi Yuqi (m) / (China) Chen Yufei (f)
  - Doubles: Indonesia (Fajar Alfian & Muhammad Rian Ardianto) (m) / South Korea (Chang Ye-na & Jung Kyung-eun) (f)
  - Mixed: Denmark (Mathias Bay-Smidt & Rikke Søby Hansen)
- April 30 – May 5: 2019 New Zealand Open in Auckland
  - Singles: (Indonesia) Jonatan Christie (m) / (South Korea) An Se-young (f)
  - Doubles: Indonesia (Mohammad Ahsan & Hendra Setiawan) (m) / South Korea (Kim So-yeong & Kong Hee-yong) (f)
  - Mixed: Malaysia (Chan Peng Soon & Goh Liu Ying)
- June 4 – 9: 2019 Australian Open in (Australia) Sydney
  - Singles: (Indonesia) Jonatan Christie (m) / (China) Chen Yufei (f)
  - Doubles: South Korea (Ko Sung-hyun & Shin Baek-cheol) (m) / Japan (Yuki Fukushima & Sayaka Hirota) (f)
  - Mixed: China (Wang Yilyu & Huang Dongping)
- July 9 – 14: 2019 U.S. Open in (United States) Fullerton
  - Singles: (Chinese Taipei) LIN Chun-yi (m) / (China) Wang Zhiyi (f)
  - Doubles: South Korea (Ko Sung-hyun & Shin Baek-cheol) (m) / Japan (Nami Matsuyama & Chiharu Shida) (f)
  - Mixed: Chinese Taipei (Lee Jhe-huei & Hsu Ya-ching)
- September 3 – 8: Chinese Taipei Open 2019 in Taipei
  - Singles: (Chinese Taipei) Chou Tien-chen (m) / (South Korea) Sung Ji-hyun (f)
  - Doubles: Malaysia (Goh V Shem & Tan Wee Kiong) (m) / Thailand (Jongkolphan Kititharakul & Rawinda Prajongjai) (f)
  - Mixed: Hong Kong (Tang Chun Man & Tse Ying Suet)
- October 29 – November 3: Macau Open 2019 in Macau
  - Singles: (Thailand) Sitthikom Thammasin (m) / (Canada) Michelle Li (f)
  - Doubles: China (Li Junhui & Liu Yuchen) (m) / China (Du Yue & Li Yinhui) (f)
  - Mixed: Thailand (Dechapol Puavaranukroh & Sapsiree Taerattanachai)
- November 19 – 24: Korea Masters 2019 in (South Korea) Seoul
  - Singles: (m) / (f)
  - Doubles: (m) / (f)
  - Mixed:
- November 26 – December 1: Syed Modi International 2019 in (India) Lucknow
  - Singles: (Chinese Taipei) Wang Tzu-wei (m) / (Spain) Carolina Marín (f)
  - Doubles: (China) (He Jiting & Tan Qiang) (m) / (South Korea) (Baek Ha-na & Jung Kyung-eun) (f)
  - Mixed: (Russia) (Rodion Alimov & Alina Davletova)

Level Six (Super 100)

- March 12 – 17: Lingshui China Masters 2019 in Lingshui Li Autonomous County
  - Singles: (China) Weng Hongyang (m) / (South Korea) Kim Ga-eun (f)
  - Doubles: Chinese Taipei (Lee Jhe-huei & Yang Po-hsuan) (m) / South Korea (Baek Ha-na & Kim Hye-rin) (f)
  - Mixed: Hong Kong (Tang Chun Man & Ng Tsz Yau)
- March 19 – 24: 2019 Orleans Masters in Orléans
  - Singles: (Japan) Koki Watanabe (m) / (Japan) Saena Kawakami (f)
  - Doubles: Chinese Taipei (Lee Yang & Wang Chi-lin) (m) / England (Chloe Birch & Lauren Smith) (f)
  - Mixed: France (Thom Gicquel & Delphine Delrue)
- July 2 – 7: 2019 Canada Open in Calgary
  - Singles: (China) Li Shifeng (m) / (South Korea) An Se-young (f)
  - Doubles: Denmark (Mathias Boe & Mads Conrad-Petersen) (m) / Australia (Setyana Mapasa & Gronya Somerville) (f)
  - Mixed: South Korea (Ko Sung-hyun & Eom Hye-won)
- July 16 – 21: 2019 Russian Open in (Russia) Vladivostok
  - Singles: (Indonesia) Shesar Hiren Rhustavito (m) / (Chinese Taipei) Pai Yu-po (f)
  - Doubles: Denmark (Mathias Boe & Mads Conrad-Petersen) (m) / Indonesia (Ni Ketut Mahadewi Istirani & Tania Oktaviani Kusumah) (f)
  - Mixed: Indonesia (Adnan Maulana & Mychelle Crhystine Bandaso)
- August 6 – 11: 2019 Hyderabad Open in (India) Hyderabad
  - Singles: (India) Sourabh Verma (m) / (Singapore) Yeo Jia Min (f)
  - Doubles: Indonesia (Muhammad Shohibul Fikri & Bagas Maulana) (m) / South Korea (Baek Ha-na & Jung Kyung-eun) (f)
  - Mixed: Malaysia (HOO Pang Ron & Cheah Yee See)
- August 13 – 18: 2019 Akita Masters in Akita
  - Singles: (Indonesia) Firman Abdul Kholik (m) / (South Korea) An Se-young (f)
  - Doubles: China (Ou Xuanyi & Zhang Nan) (m) / Japan (Ayako Sakuramoto & Yukiko Takahata) (f)
  - Mixed: South Korea (Ko Sung-hyun & Eom Hye-won)
- September 10 – 15: 2019 Vietnam Open in Ho Chi Minh City
  - Singles: (India) Sourabh Verma (m) / (China) ZHANG Yiman (f)
  - Doubles: South Korea (Choi Sol-gyu & Seo Seung-jae) (m) / Indonesia (Della Destiara Haris & Rizki Amelia Pradipta) (f)
  - Mixed: China (GUO Xinwa & ZHANG Shuxian)
- October 1 – 6: 2019 Indonesia Masters in Malang
  - Singles: (China) Sun Feixiang (m) / (China) Wang Zhiyi (f)
  - Doubles: China (Ou Xuanyi & Zhang Nan) (m) / Indonesia (Siti Fadia Silva Ramadhanti & Ribka Sugiarto) (f)
  - Mixed: China (GUO Xinwa & ZHANG Shuxian)
- October 8 – 13: 2019 Dutch Open in Almere
  - Singles: (India) Lakshya Sen (m) / (China) Wang Zhiyi (f)
  - Doubles: Russia (Vladimir Ivanov & Ivan Sozonov) (m) / Bulgaria (Gabriela Stoeva & Stefani Stoeva) (f)
  - Mixed: Netherlands (Robin Tabeling & Selena Piek)
- November 20 – 24: Scottish Open 2019 in (Scotland) Glasgow
  - Singles: (India) Lakshya Sen (m) / (France) Qi Xuefei (f)
  - Doubles: (Scotland) (Alexander Dunn & Adam Hall) (m) / (Denmark) (Amalie Magelund & Freja Ravn) (f)
  - Mixed: (Denmark) (Mathias Christiansen & Alexandra Bøje)

== Leagues ==
- December 22, 2018 – January 13, 2019: 2018–19 Premier Badminton League in India.
  - The Bengaluru Raptors defeated the Mumbai Rockets, 4–3, to win their maiden Premier Badminton League title.
