= Bengaluru Raptors =

- Sport: Badminton
- Founded: 2013 (renamed as Bengaluru Raptors in 2018)
- League: Premier Badminton League
- Based in: Bengaluru, India
- Home ground: Kanteerava Indoor Stadium
- Owner: Slash21 Sports Management Pvt. Ltd.
- Head coach: Arvind Bhat
- Captain: B. Sai Praneeth
- Champions: 2018-19, 2020
- Website: blrraptors.com

Bengaluru Raptors (previously Banga Beats, Bengaluru Blasters) is a professional badminton franchise representing Bengaluru in the Premier Badminton League (PBL). The team was one of the six founding members of the Premier Badminton League (previously Indian Badminton League) in 2013.

The Raptors last featured in season 5 of the Premier Badminton League (2020), finishing as champions for the second time in their history. They previously finished as champions in the 2018-19 edition, defeating the Mumbai Rockets in the final.

== Franchise history ==
=== Franchise ownership ===
The franchise was initially owned by the conglomerate, BOP group in 2013 before Sachin Tendulkar bought the franchise and named it after his Blasters sports franchises in 2016. In 2018, Matrix Badminton Teamworks Pvt. Ltd. took over the team and renamed it to Bengaluru Raptors. The team is currently owned by Slash21 Sports Management Pvt. Ltd. along with the Kankanala Sports Group.

=== Franchise participation ===
The Bengaluru based franchise first featured in the Indian Badminton League in 2013 under the name Banga Beats. The team's name was later changed to the Bengaluru Topguns and then to Bengaluru Blasters, featuring in the first 3 seasons of the Premier Badminton League recording their best performance in the 2017-18 season, where they finished as runners-up. In the 2018-19 season, the team was officially renamed to Bengaluru Raptors, consequently recording back to back victories in the Premier Badminton League in season 4 and 5 respectively.

== Season history ==
=== Indian Badminton League (IBL), 2013 ===
The inaugural edition of the Indian Badminton League saw the participation of six teams that begun on the 14th of August 2013. Banga Beats finished 6th in the overall standings in their debut season, recording two victories in five games. After losing their opening game against the Mumbai Masters, they bounced back by recording a win against the Awadhe Warriors. They then went on to face consecutive defeats against the Pune Pistons and the Delhi Smashers before recording a win in their final game against the Hyderabad HotShots. The Hyderabad HotShots finished as champions of that season.

Banga Beats in the Indian Badminton League, 2013
Date		Score	
League Stage
August 15	Banga Beats	2 - 3	Mumbai Masters
August 18	Banga Beats	4 - 1	Awadhe Warriors
August 23	Banga Beats	1 - 4	Pune Pistons
August 25	Banga Beats	1 - 4	Delhi Smashers
August 27	Banga Beats	3 - 2	Hyderabad HotShots

Final Standings, IBL 2013
Team	Pld	W	L	GW	GL	Pts
Hyderabad Hotshots (C)	5	3	2	14	11	17
Awadhe Warriors (R)	5	3	2	13	12	16
Pune Pistons	5	3	2	13	12	16
Mumbai Marathas	5	2	3	13	12	15
Delhi Smashers	5	2	3	11	14	13
Banga Beats	5	2	3	11	14	13

=== Premier Badminton League, 2016 ===
The maiden season of the Premier Badminton League saw the participation of six teams, with the top four teams advancing to the semi-finals. The Bengaluru based franchise was officially renamed to Bengaluru Topguns for the season and finished at the bottom of the table, recording 10 points in 5 games. The Delhi Dashers finished as the champions of the inaugural season of the PBL.

Bengaluru Topguns in PBL, 2016
Date		Score	
League Stage
3 January	Hyderabad Hunters	3-2	Bengaluru Topguns
5 January	Mumbai Rockets	4-3	Bengaluru Topguns
6 January	Awadhe Warriors	4-1	Bengaluru Topguns
8 January	Delhi Dashers	5-2	Bengaluru Topguns
13 January	Chennai Smashers	4-1	Bengaluru Topguns

Final PBL standings, 2016
Pos.	Teams	MP	RMW	TMW	TML	Pts.
1	Delhi Dashers (C)	25	10	5	0	20
2	Awadhe Warriors	25	10	4	1	17
3	Chennai Smashers	25	10	4	1	17
4	Mumbai Rockets (R)	25	9	3	2	13
5	Hyderabad Hunters	25	7	3	2	11
6	Bengaluru Topguns	25	9	2	3	10

* Each tie (MP) will have five matches each. Regular Match Win (RMW) = 1 point, Trump Match Win (TMW) = 2 points, Trump Match Lost (TML) = -1 point

=== Premier Badminton League, 2017 ===
The second edition of the Premier Badminton League featured 6 teams and was held in January 2017. The Bengaluru Topguns were officially renamed to Bengaluru Blasters following a transfer in ownership. The Blasters finished the season at 5th place, recording 14 points in 5 ties. The Bengaluru Blasters recorded their first and only victory of that season in their first match against the Delhi Acers. The Chennai Smashers finished as champions of the second edition of the PBL.

Bengaluru Blasters in PBL, 2017
Date		Score	
League Stage
1 January	Bengaluru Blasters	4-3	Delhi Acers
3 January	Bengaluru Blasters	0-5	Chennai Smashers
7 January	Bengaluru Blasters	3-4	Hyderabad Hunters
8 January	Bengaluru Blasters	1-4	Mumbai Rockets
9 January	Bengaluru Blasters	3-4	Awadhe Warriors

Final PBL Standings, 2017
Team	TP	RMW	TMW	TML	Pts.
Awadhe Warriors	5	11	5	0	21
Mumbai Rockets (RU)	5	12	4	1	19
Chennai Smashers (C)	5	8	5	0	18
Hyderabad Hunters	5	10	3	2	14
Bengaluru Blasters	5	7	3	2	11
Delhi Acers	5	4	3	2	8

* Each tie (MP) will have five matches each. Regular Match Win (RMW) = 1 point, Trump Match Win (TMW) = 2 points, Trump Match Lost (TML) = -1 point

=== Premier Badminton League, 2017-18 ===
The third edition of the Premier Badminton League saw the participation of eight teams, with the top four teams advancing to the semi-finals. The Bengaluru Blasters finished as runners-up for the season, facing a defeat in the final against the Hyderabad Hunters. The Bengaluru Blasters finished at fourth in the league stage, recording a total of 14 points.

The Blasters recorded two consecutive wins in their first two games against the Delhi Dashers and the Mumbai Rockets respectively and then went on to lose their next three games, ending their league stage campaign with a defeat against the Hyderabad Hunters. A semi-final victory against the Ahmedabad Smash Masters saw the Bengaluru franchise advance into the final for the first time in their history. The Bengaluru Blasters faced defeat in the final against the Hyderabad Hunters.

Bengaluru Blasters in PBL, 2017-18
Date		Score	
League Stage
28 December	Delhi Dashers	2 - 5	Bengaluru Blasters
01 January	Bengaluru Blasters	6 - (-1)	Mumbai Rockets
05 January	Bengaluru Blasters	2 - 3	North Eastern Warriors
08 January	Chennai Smashers	3 - 2	Bengaluru Blasters
11 January	Hyderabad Hunters	6 - (-1)	Bengaluru Blasters
Semi-Final
13 January	Bengaluru Blasters	4 - 3	Ahmedabad Smash Masters
Final
14 January	Hyderabad Hunters	4 - 3	Bengaluru Blasters

Final PBL Standings, 2017-18
Team	TP	RMW	RML	TMW	TML	Pts.
Hyderabad Hunters (C)	5	13	7	4	1	20
Ahmedabad Smash Masters	5	10	10	4	1	17
Delhi Dashers	5	11	9	3	2	15
Bengaluru Blasters (R)	5	13	7	2	3	14
Awadhe Warriors	5	8	12	3	2	12
Chennai Smashers	5	8	12	3	2	12
North Eastern Warriors	5	5	15	4	1	12
Mumbai Rockets	5	6	14	3	2	10

=== Premier Badminton League, 2018-19 ===
The fourth edition of the Premier Badminton League featured nine teams with the Pune 7 Aces joining as a new team that season. The Bengaluru Blasters were officially renamed as the Bengaluru Raptors for the season.

After losing the first game of the season against the Ahmedabad Smash Masters, the Raptors managed to win all of their remaining games, going on to defeat the Awadhe Warriors in the semi-final and the Mumbai Rockets in the final to record their maiden Premier Badminton League title.

Bengaluru Raptors in PBL, 2018-19
Date		Score	
League Stage
28 December	Ahmedabad Smash Masters	4 – 3	Bengaluru Raptors
30 December	Pune 7 Aces	3 – 4	Bengaluru Raptors
02 January	Delhi Dashers	1 – 2	Bengaluru Raptors
05 January	Bengaluru Raptors	4 – 3	North Eastern Warriors
08 January	Bengaluru Raptors	5 – 0	Mumbai Rockets
10 January	Bengaluru Raptors	3 – 2	Chennai Smashers
Semi-Final
11 January	Awadhe Warriors	2 – 4	Bengaluru Raptors
Final
13 January	Bengaluru Raptors	4 – 3	Mumbai Rockets

Final PBL Standings, 2018-19
Team	MP	RMW	RML	TMW	TML	Pts.
Awadhe Warriors	30	13	11	6	0	25
Hyderabad Hunters	30	15	9	5	1	24
Bengaluru Raptors (C)	30	12	12	5	1	21
Mumbai Rockets (R)	30	13	11	4	2	19
Pune 7 Aces	30	8	16	5	1	17
Chennai Smashers	30	12	12	3	3	15
Ahmedabad Smash Masters	30	7	17	4	2	13
North Eastern Warriors	30	11	13	2	4	11
Delhi Dashers	30	9	15	1	5	6

=== Premier Badminton League, 2020 ===
The fifth edition of the Premier Badminton League featured seven competing teams. The Bengaluru Raptors defeated the Northeastern Warriors in the final to become the first team to win consecutive titles in the competition's history. They recorded 22 points from 6 ties, and finished second in the points table at the end of the league stage.

The Raptors faced three consecutive defeats in their first three games but managed to turn things around and qualify for the semi-final with victories over the Hyderabad Hunters, Mumbai Rockets and Awadhe Warriors without losing a single match in either of the ties.

Bengaluru Raptors in PBL, 2020
Date		Score	
League Stage
21 January	Northeastern Warriors	4–3	Bengaluru Raptors
24 January	Chennai Superstarz	4–3	Bengaluru Raptors
27 January	Pune 7 Aces	4–3	Bengaluru Raptors
31 January	Hyderabad Hunters	0–3	Bengaluru Raptors
31 January	Bengaluru Raptors	5–0	Mumbai Rockets
6 February	Bengaluru Raptors	5–0	Awadhe Warriors
Semi-Final
8 February	Pune 7 Aces	3–4	Bengaluru Raptors
Final
9 February	Northeastern Warriors	2–4	Bengaluru Raptors

Final PBL Standings, 2020
Rank	Team	MP	RMW	RML	TMW	TML	Pts.
1	Northeastern Warriors (R)	30	13	11	5	1	22
2	Bengaluru Raptors (C)	30	13	11	5	1	22
3	Chennai Superstarz	30	10	14	6	0	22
4	Pune 7 Aces	30	14	10	4	2	20
5	Awadhe Warriors	30	11	13	3	3	14
6	Hyderabad Hunters	30	11	13	2	4	11
7	Mumbai Rockets	30	4	20	4	2	10

== Overall season summary ==
Year	League standing	Final standing
2013	6th out of 6	6th Place
2016	6th out of 6	6th Place
2017	5th out of 6	5th Place
2017–18	2nd out of 8	Runners-up
2018–19	1st out of 9	Champions
2020	1st out of 7	Champions

== Team roster, 2020 ==
Coach	(India) Arvind Bhat
Domestic	(India) Ansal Yadav
Domestic	(India) Arun George
Domestic	(India) B. Sai Praneeth (C)
Domestic	(India) Medha Shashidharan
Overseas	(Chinese Taipei) Tai Tzu-ying
Overseas	(France) Brice Leverdez
Overseas	(Indonesia) Rian Agung Saputro
Overseas	(Malaysia) Chan Peng Soon
Overseas	(South Korea) Eom Hye-won

== Honours ==
Premier Badminton League, 2017-18

- Runners-up

Premier Badminton League, 2018-19

- Champions

Premier Badminton League, 2020

- Champions
