= Pune Pistons =

Indian badminton franchise

- Sport: Badminton
- Founded: 2013
- Folded: 2013
- Based in: Pune, India
- Home ground: Shree Shiv Chhatrapati Sports Complex, Pune
- Owner: Mohit Burman; Savan Daru (Dabur India Ltd.)
- Head coach: Nikhil Kanetkar
- Captain: Ashwini Ponnappa
- IBL wins: none
- Website: www.punepistons.com

Pune Pistons was a badminton franchise owned by Mohit Burman (Dabur Group) & Savan Daru for the Indian Badminton League. The team's home ground was the Shree Shiv Chhatrapati Sports Complex in Pune. The team was captained by Ashwini Ponnappa. The team participated in the league only in the inaugural season.

== Current squad ==
Country	Player
India	Ashwini Ponnappa
Vietnam	Nguyễn Tiến Minh
India	Sourabh Verma
India	Anup Sridhar
Germany	Juliane Schenk
Denmark	Joachim Fischer Nielsen
India	Sanave Thomas
India	Arun Vishnu
Malaysia	Tan Wee Kiong
India	Rupesh Kumar K. T.
India	Revati Devasthale

== 2013 season ==
=== League stage ===
14 August, 20:00 at Delhi	Delhi Smashers	2 - 3	Pune Pistons
17 August, 20:00 at Lucknow	Mumbai Masters	2 - 3	Pune Pistons
19 August, 20:00 at Mumbai	Hyderabad HotShots	4 - 1	Pune Pistons
23 August, 18:00 at Pune	Banga Beats	1 - 4	Pune Pistons
26 August, 20:00 at Hyderabad	Awadhe Warriors	3 - 2	Pune Pistons

Pune Pistons finished the 3rd in the group stage, qualifying for the semi-final.

Team	Pts	Pld	W	L	GW	GL
Hyderabad HotShots	17	5	3	2	14	11
Awadhe Warriors	16	5	3	2	13	12
Pune Pistons	16	5	3	2	13	12
Mumbai Masters	15	5	2	3	13	12
Delhi Smashers	13	5	2	3	11	14
Banga Beats	13	5	2	3	11	14

=== Semi-final ===
Pune Pistons were beaten by Hyderabad HotShots in semi final of Indian Badminton League.

28 August, 20:00 at Hyderabad	Pune Pistons	0 - 3	Hyderabad HotShots

- Ajay Jayaram (HH) beat Tien Minh Nyugen (PP), 21 - 17, 21 – 11.
- Saina Nehwal (HH) beat Juliane Schenk (PP), 21 – 10, 19 – 21, 11 – 8.
- Goh V Shem and Lim Khim Wah (HH) beat Joachim Fischer Nielsen and Sanave Thomas (PP), 16 – 21, 21 -14, 11 – 7.
