= 2018–19 Premier Badminton League =

Tournament information
- Sport: Badminton
- Location: India
- Dates: December 2018–January 2019
- Administrator: Premier Badminton League
- Teams: 9

Final positions
- Champions: Bengaluru Raptors
- Runner-up: Mumbai Rockets

2018–19 Premier Badminton League was the fourth edition of the Premier Badminton League. It was played from 22 December 2018 to 13 January 2019. The season featured a new team Pune 7 Aces, bringing the total number of teams to 9. Bengaluru Blasters were renamed Bengaluru Raptors.

Bengaluru Raptors beat Mumbai Rockets by 4–3 in the final tie to lift their maiden title.

== Squads ==
Ahmedabad Smash Masters	Awadhe Warriors	Bengaluru Raptors
(Denmark) Viktor Axelsen	(South Korea) Son Wan-ho	(India) Srikanth Kidambi
(India) Anoushka Parikh	(India) Ashwini Ponnappa	(Indonesia) Mohammad Ahsan
(India) N. Sikki Reddy	(Denmark) Mathias Christiansen	(Indonesia) Hendra Setiawan
(India) Satwiksairaj Rankireddy	(Chinese Taipei) Lee Yang	(India) B. Sai Praneeth
(Hong Kong) Lee Chun Hei	(United States) Zhang Beiwen	(India) Mithun Manjunath
(India) K. Nandagopal	(South Korea) Lee Dong-keun	(England) Lauren Smith
(Scotland) Kirsty Gilmour	(India) Sanyogita Ghorpade	(India) Sanjana Santosh
(India) Vaishnavi Bhale	(India) Gurusai Dutt	(England) Marcus Ellis
(Malaysia) Liew Daren	(India) Rasika Raje	(Vietnam) Vũ Thị Trang
(India) Sourabh Varma	(India) Arjun M.R.	(Vietnam) Nguyễn Tiến Minh
Chennai Smashers	Delhi Dashers	Hyderabad Hunters
(South Korea) Sung Ji-hyun	(India) H. S. Prannoy	(India) P. V. Sindhu
(England) Gabby Adcock	(China) Chai Biao	(South Korea) Eom Hye-won
(England) Chris Adcock	(China) Wang Sijie	(South Korea) Kim Sa-rang
(India) Rutaparna Panda	(Thailand) Maneepong Jongjit	(Thailand) Bodin Isara
(India) Sumeeth Reddy	(Russia) Evgeniya Kosetskaya	(India) Sai Uttejita Rao Chukka
(India) Saili Rane	(Indonesia) Tommy Sugiarto	(South Korea) Lee Hyun-il
(England) Rajiv Ouseph	(India) Harika Veludurthi	(India) Arun George
(India) Parupalli Kashyap	(India) Vighnesh Devlekar	(India) Meghana Jakkampudi
(Hong Kong) Or Chin Chung	(India) Chirag Sen	(Netherlands) Mark Caljouw
(Malaysia) Chong Wei Feng	(Chinese Taipei) Lee Chia-hsin	(India) Rahul Yadav Chittaboina
Mumbai Rockets	North Eastern Warriors	Pune 7 Aces
(South Korea) Lee Yong-dae	(India) Saina Nehwal	(Spain) Carolina Marín
(Indonesia) Pia Zebadiah Bernadeth	(South Korea) Kim Ha-na	(India) Chirag Shetty
(South Korea) Kim Gi-jung	(South Korea) Yoo Yeon-seong	(Denmark) Mathias Boe
(India) Shreyanshi Pardeshi	(Thailand) Tanongsak Saensomboonsuk	(Russia) Vladimir Ivanov
(India) Sameer Verma	(China) Tian Houwei	(Denmark) Line Kjærsfeldt
(India) Kuhoo Garg	(India) K. Maneesha	(India) Lakshya Sen
(India) Manu Attri	(Chinese Taipei) Liao Min-chun	(France) Brice Leverdez
(Denmark) Anders Antonsen	(India) Dhruv Kapila	(Indonesia) Sony Dwi Kuncoro
(India) Pratul Joshi	(India) Siril Verma	(India) Ajay Jayaram
(India) Anura Prabhudesai	(India) Rituparna Das	(India) Prajakta Sawant

== Points table ==
Team	MP	RMW	RML	TMW	TML	Pts.
Awadhe Warriors	30	13	11	6	0	25
Hyderabad Hunters	30	15	9	5	1	24
Bengaluru Raptors	30	12	12	5	1	21
Mumbai Rockets	30	13	11	4	2	19
Pune 7 Aces	30	8	16	5	1	17
Chennai Smashers	30	12	12	3	3	15
Ahmedabad Smash Masters	30	7	17	4	2	13
North Eastern Warriors	30	11	13	2	4	11
Delhi Dashers	30	9	15	1	5	6

- Qualified for knockouts
- Five matches (MP) constitute one tie
- Each team will play six ties
- 1 point for each Regular Match Won (RMW)
- 0 points for Regular Matches Lost (RML)
- 2 points for each Trump Match Won (TMW)
- -1 point for each Trump Match Lost (TML)

Source: Official PBL website

== Fixtures ==
=== League Stage ===
Date	Time	Venue	Team 1	Result	Team 2
22 Dec	19:00	Mumbai	Pune 7 Aces	(-1) – 6	Hyderabad Hunters
23 Dec	16:00	Mumbai	Mumbai Rockets	5 – 0	Delhi Dashers
23 Dec	19:00	Mumbai	Ahmedabad Smash Masters	4 – 1	North Eastern Warriors
24 Dec	19:00	Mumbai	Pune 7 Aces	3 – 4	Awadhe Warriors
25 Dec	19:00	Hyderabad	Hyderabad Hunters	5 – 0	Chennai Smashers
26 Dec	19:00	Hyderabad	Delhi Dashers	1 – 4	Ahmedabad Smash Masters
27 Dec	19:00	Hyderabad	North Eastern Warriors	4 – 1	Mumbai Rockets
28 Dec	16:00	Hyderabad	Ahmedabad Smash Masters	4 – 3	Bengaluru Raptors
28 Dec	19:00	Hyderabad	Hyderabad Hunters	1 – 4	Awadhe Warriors
29 Dec	16:00	Pune	Pune 7 Aces	4 – 3	Mumbai Rockets
29 Dec	19:00	Pune	North Eastern Warriors	3 – 0	Delhi Dashers
30 Dec	16:00	Pune	Ahmedabad Smash Masters	(-1) – 6	Chennai Smashers
30 Dec	19:00	Pune	Pune 7 Aces	3 – 4	Bengaluru Raptors
31 Dec	19:00	Pune	Awadhe Warriors	2 – 5	Mumbai Rockets
1 Jan	19:00	Pune	Hyderabad Hunters	5 – 0	North Eastern Warriors
2 Jan	19:00	Ahmedabad	Delhi Dashers	1 – 2	Bengaluru Raptors
3 Jan	19:00	Ahmedabad	Pune 7 Aces	3 – 4	Chennai Smashers
4 Jan	19:00	Ahmedabad	Ahmedabad Smash Masters	(-1) – 6	Awadhe Warriors
5 Jan	16:00	Ahmedabad	Mumbai Rockets	5 – 0	Chennai Smashers
5 Jan	19:00	Ahmedabad	Bengaluru Raptors	4 – 3	North Eastern Warriors
6 Jan	16:00	Ahmedabad	Delhi Dashers	0 – 5	Pune 7 Aces
6 Jan	19:00	Ahmedabad	Ahmedabad Smash Masters	3 – 4	Hyderabad Hunters
7 Jan	19:00	Bangalore	Awadhe Warriors	4 – 3	Chennai Smashers
8 Jan	19:00	Bangalore	Bengaluru Raptors	5 – 0	Mumbai Rockets
9 Jan	16:00	Bangalore	Hyderabad Hunters	3 – 4	Delhi Dashers
9 Jan	19:00	Bangalore	Awadhe Warriors	5 – 0	North Eastern Warriors
10 Jan	19:00	Bangalore	Bengaluru Raptors	3 – 2	Chennai Smashers

=== Knockout stage ===
Date	Time	Venue	Team 1	Result	Team 2
Semi-finals
11 Jan	19:00	Bangalore	Awadhe Warriors	2 – 4	Bengaluru Raptors
12 Jan	19:00	Bangalore	Hyderabad Hunters	2 – 4	Mumbai Rockets
Finals
13 Jan	19:00	Bangalore	Bengaluru Raptors	4 – 3	Mumbai Rockets

Semifinal 1
Awadhe Warriors	M. Christiansen, A. Ponnappa (Trump Match)	15 – 7, 15 – 10^{(Mixed Doubles)}	M. Ellis, L. Smith	Bengaluru Raptors
Awadhe Warriors	L. D. Keun	9 – 15, 4 – 15^{(Men's Singles)}	B. S. Praneeth	Bengaluru Raptors
Awadhe Warriors	S. W. Ho	7 – 15, 10 – 15^{(Men's Singles)}	K. Srikanth	Bengaluru Raptors
Awadhe Warriors	Y. Lee, M. Christiansen	14 – 15, 9 – 15^{(Men's Doubles)}	M. Ahsan, H. Setiawan (Trump Match)	Bengaluru Raptors
Awadhe Warriors	B. Zhang	–^{(Women's Singles)}	T. T. Vu	Bengaluru Raptors

Semifinal 2
Hyderabad Hunters	B. Isara, K. S. Rang	14 – 15, 12 – 15^{(Men's Doubles)}	K. G. Jung, L. Y. Dae	Mumbai Rockets
Hyderabad Hunters	M. Caljouw	8 – 15, 7 – 15^{(Men's Singles)}	S. Verma (Trump Match)	Mumbai Rockets
Hyderabad Hunters	P. V. Sindhu (Trump Match)	15 – 6, 15 – 5^{(Women's Singles)}	S. Pardeshi	Mumbai Rockets
Hyderabad Hunters	L. Hyun	13 – 15, 6 – 15^{(Men's Singles)}	A. Antonsen	Mumbai Rockets
Hyderabad Hunters	K. S. Rang, E. H. Won	–^{(Mixed Doubles)}	K. G. Jung, P. Z. Bernadeth	Mumbai Rockets

Final
Bengaluru Raptors	M. Ellis, L. Smith	8 – 15, 14 – 15^{(Mixed Doubles)}	K. G. Jung, P. Z. Bernadeth (Trump Match)	Mumbai Rockets
Bengaluru Raptors	K. Srikanth	15 – 7, 15 – 10^{(Men's Singles)}	A. Antonsen	Mumbai Rockets
Bengaluru Raptors	T. T. Vu (Trump Match)	15 – 8, 15 – 9^{(Women's Singles)}	S. Pardeshi	Mumbai Rockets
Bengaluru Raptors	B. S. Praneeth	15 – 7, 12 – 15, 3 – 15^{(Men's Singles)}	S. Verma	Mumbai Rockets
Bengaluru Raptors	M. Ahsan, H. Setiawan	15 – 13, 15 – 10^{(Men's Doubles)}	K. G. Jung, L. Y. Dae	Mumbai Rockets
