= Hyderabad Hunters =

Hyderabad Hunters may refer to:

- Hyderabad Hunters (badminton team), based in Hyderabad, India.
- Hyderabad Hunters (cricket team), based in Hyderabad, Pakistan in the Pakistan Junior League.
