= Babu Banarasi Das Indoor Stadium =

Sports venue in Lucknow, India

- Indoor Stadium
- Interactive map of Babu Banarasi Das Indoor Stadium
- Location: Babu Banarasi Das U.P. Badminton Academy, Vipin Khand, Gomti Nagar, Lucknow, Uttar Pradesh 226010
- Coordinates: 26.853264°N 80.980177°E
- Owner: Government of Uttar Pradesh
- Operator: Badminton Association of India
- Capacity: 5,000

Tenants
- Awadhe Warriors (2013 - Present); UP Yoddha (2017 – present)

Website
- Badminton Association of India

Babu Banarasi Das Indoor Stadium is an indoor sports venue in Lucknow, Uttar Pradesh. It is commonly used for the indoor sports including kabaddi, badminton and table tennis.

== Home team ==
Awadhe Warriors is a badminton team who is based at the stadium and is owned by Sahara Adventure Sports Limited a group company of Sahara India for the Indian Badminton League.

It's also the home ground for UP Yoddhas a Pro Kabaddi 2017 team.

== Events ==
- 2012 India Open Grand Prix Gold
- 2013 Indian Badminton League
- 2014 India Open Grand Prix Gold
- 2014 Indian Badminton League
- 2015 India Open Grand Prix Gold
- 2017 Pro Kabaddi League season
- 2017 Syed Modi International Badminton Championship
- 2022 Syed Modi International Badminton Championship
- 2024 Syed Modi International Badminton Championship
- Athrise Badminton & Chess Championship 2025
- 2025 Syed Modi International Badminton Championships
