= Ahmedabad Smash Masters =

Former badminton team in India

- Sport: Badminton
- Founded: 2017
- Folded: 2019
- League: Premier Badminton League
- Based in: Ahmedabad, India
- Home ground: The Arena by TransStadia
- Owner: Padmanabh Sports
- Head coach: Madhumita Bisht
- Captain: Viktor Axelsen
- PBL wins: none

Ahmedabad Smash Masters was a badminton team owned by Padmanabh Sports Pvt. Ltd. for the Premier Badminton League (PBL). The team's home ground was The Arena by TransStadia, Ahmedabad. In the 2017–18 season, the team was captained by Indian badminton player Prannoy H. S., and coached by Madhumita Bisht. In the 2018–19 season, the team was captained by Viktor Axelsen from Denmark. The team was folded after 4th season due to financial issues.

== History ==
The team's first season in the PBL was in 2017. The Badminton team was owned by Padmanabh Sports Private Limited.

Ahmedabad Smash Masters was folded and had their license cancelled after 4th Season because they failed to fulfill their financial obligations.

== 2017-2018 squad ==
=== Indian players ===
- (India) Prannoy H. S. (Captain)
- (India) K. Nandagopal
- (India) Siril Verma
- (India) Sourabh Verma
- (India) Sri Krishna Priya Kudaravalli

=== Foreign players ===
- (Denmark) Kamilla Rytter Juhl
- (Hong Kong) Law Cheuk Him
- (Hong Kong) Lee Chun Hei
- (Bulgaria) Stefani Stoeva
- (Taiwan) Tai Tzu-ying

== 2018-2019 squad ==
=== Indian players ===
- (India) Anoushka Parikh
- (India) N. Sikki Reddy
- (India) Satwiksairaj Rankireddy
- (India) K. Nandagopal
- (India) Vaishnavi Bhale
- (India) Sourabh Varma

=== Foreign players ===
- (Denmark) Viktor Axelsen (Captain)
- (Hong Kong) Lee Chun Hei
- (Scotland) Kirsty Gilmour
- (Malaysia) Liew Daren
