= Mumbai Masters =

- Sport: Badminton
- Founded: 2013
- Based in: Mumbai, India
- Home ground: National Sports Club of India
- Owner: Akshay Kumar; Vigish Pathak
- Head coach: TBD
- Captain: TBD
- PBL wins: none

Mumbai Masters is a badminton team owned by Akshay Kumar and Vigish Pathak for the Premier Badminton League. The team's home ground is National Sports Club of India in Mumbai.

== 2016 roster ==
- (India) Prannoy H. S.
- (India) Gurusai Dutt
- (China) Han Li
- (China) Liu Zidie
- (India) Ruthvika Gadde
- (India) Manu Attri
- (Thailand) Chayut Triyachart
- (Russia) Vladimir Ivanov
- (Denmark) Mathias Boe
- (Denmark) Kamilla Rytter Juhl

== 2013 season ==
The following are the fixtures for Mumbai Masters in the 2013 Indian Badminton League.

15 August, 20:00, Delhi	Banga Beats	2 - 3	Mumbai Masters
17 August, 20:00, Lucknow	Mumbai Masters	2 - 3	Pune Pistons
20 August, 18:00, Mumbai	Mumbai Masters	4 - 1	Delhi Smashers
22 August, 16:00, Pune	Hyderabad HotShots	3 - 2	Mumbai Masters
24 August, 20:00, Bangalore	Awadhe Warriors	3 - 2	Mumbai Masters

=== Semi final ===
Mumbai Masters qualified for the semi-finals of the Indian Badminton League 2013, after finishing 4th in the league table with 15 points. The semi final was against Awadhe Warriors.

29 August, 20:00, Bangalore	Mumbai Masters	2 - 3	Awadhe Warriors

Mumbai Masters were defeated in semi final and finished 3rd in the tournament alongside Pune Pistons.
