= Awadhe Warriors =

- Sport: Badminton
- Founded: 2013
- League: Premier Badminton League
- Based in: Lucknow, India
- Home ground: Babu Banarasi Das Indoor Stadium
- Owner: Sahara Adventure Sports Limited
- Head coach: Anup Sridhar
- PBL wins: none
- Website: www.awadhewarriors.in

Awadhe Warriors is a badminton team owned by Sahara Adventure Sports Limited a group company of Sahara India for the Premier Badminton League (PBL). The team's home ground is Babu Banarasi Das Indoor Stadium, Lucknow. The team is coached by Anup Sridhar.

Awadhe Warriors has La Martiniere Boys' College, Luckow, as its school partner.

== Current squad ==
The squad for 2020 PBL season is:

=== Indian players ===
- (India) Ajay Jayaram
- (India) Subhankar Dey
- (India) Tanvi Lad

=== Overseas players ===
- (Denmark) Christinna Pedersen
- (Hong Kong) Wong Wing Ki
- (South Korea) Ko Sung-hyun
- (South Korea) Shin Baek-cheol
- (United States) Beiwen Zhang

== 2013 season squad ==
=== Indian players ===
- (India) P.V. Sindhu (Captain)
- (India) Gurusai Datt
- (India) Kidambi Srikanth
- (India) Ruthvika Gadde
- (India) K. Maneesha
- (India) Nanda Gopal
- (India) Vinay Singh

=== Foreign players ===
- (Thailand) Sapsiree Taerattanachai
- (Indonesia) Markis Kido
- (Malaysia) Chong Wei Feng
- (Denmark) Mathias Boe

== 2013 season ==
=== League matches ===
15 August, 16:00 at Delhi	Chennai	2 - 3	Hyderabad HotShots
18 August, 20:00 at Lucknow	Awadhe Warriors	1 - 4	Banga Beats
22 August, 20:00 at Pune	Awadhe Warriors	4 - 1	Delhi Smashers
24 August, 20:00 at Bangalore	Awadhe Warriors	3 - 2	Mumbai Masters
26 August, 20:00 at Hyderabad	Awadhe Warriors	3 - 2	Pune Pistons

=== Semi final ===
29 August, 20:00 at Bangalore	Awadhe Warriors	3 - 2	Mumbai Masters

=== Final ===
31 August, 20:00 at Mumbai	Awadhe Warriors	1 - 3	Hyderabad HotShots

- Kidambi Srikanth (AW) beat S. Tanongsak (HH) by 21-12, 21-20.
- Saina Nehwal (HH) beat P. V. Sindhu (AW) by 21-15, 21-7.
- Goh V. Shem & Lim Khim Wah (HH) beat Markis Kido & Mathias Boe (AW) by 21-14, 13-21, 11-4.
- Ajay Jayaram (HH) beat Gurusai Datt (AW) by 10-21, 21-17, 11-7.

== 2016 season squad ==
Team coach for season 2016

- (India) Anup Sridhar

=== Indian players ===
- (India) Saina Nehwal (Captain)
- (India) Sai Praneeth
- (India) Sourabh Verma
- (India) Vrushali Gummadi
- (India) K. Maneesha

=== Foreign players ===
- (China) Cai Yun
- (Thailand) Tanongsak Saensomboonsuk
- (Denmark) Christinna Pedersen
- (Indonesia) Hendra Gunawan
- (Thailand) Bodin Issara

== 2017 season squad ==
Team coach for season 2017

- (India) Anup Sridhar

=== Indian players ===
- (India) Saina Nehwal (Captain)
- (India) Srikanth Kidambi
- (India) Rituparna Das
- (India) Prajakta Sawant
- (India) Aditya Joshi

=== Foreign players ===
- (Hong Kong) Wong Wing Ki
- (Thailand) Bodin Issara
- (Malaysia) Goh V Shem
- (Indonesia) Markis Kido
- (Thailand) Savitree Amitrapai

== 2017–18 season squad ==
Team coach for season 2017-18

- (India) Anup Sridhar

=== Indian players ===
- (India) Saina Nehwal (Captain)
- (India) Sai Uttejitha Rao
- (India) Parupalli Kashyap
- (India) Mahima Aggarwal
- (India) Kidambi Srikanth
- (India) Hendra Setiawan
- (India) Harshit Aggarwal

=== Foreign players ===
- (Denmark) Christinna Pedersen
- (Hong Kong) Or Chin Chung
- (Hong Kong) Tang Chun Man

== 2018-19 season squad ==
Team coach for season 2018-19

- (India) Anup Sridhar
- (India) Arun Vishnu (Doubles)

Technical Advisory

- Uttsav Mishra

=== Indian players ===
- (India) Ashwini Ponnappa (Captain)
- (India) Sanyogita Ghorpade
- (India) Gurusai Dutt
- (India) Rasika Raje
- (India) Arjun M.R.

=== Foreign players ===
- (South Korea) Son Wan-ho (Icon and captain)
- (Denmark) Mathias Christiansen
- (Taiwan) Lee Yang
- (United States) Zhang Beiwen
- (South Korea) Lee Dong-keun
