= Delhi Smashers =

Badminton franchise

Krrish Delhi Smashers
- Sport: Badminton
- Founded: 2013
- Based in: Delhi, India
- Home ground: DDA Badminton and Squash Stadium
- Owner: Krrish Group
- Head coach: Rashid Sidek
- Captain: Jwala Gutta
- IBL wins: none

Delhi Smashers was a badminton franchise owned by Krrish Group for the Indian Badminton League. The team's home ground is DDA Badminton and Squash Stadium in Delhi. The team was captained by Jwala Gutta.

== Current squad ==
Country	Player
India	Jwala Gutta
Hong Kong	Wong Wing Ki
India	Prannoy H. S.
India	B. Sai Praneeth
India	Arundhati Pantawane
Malaysia	Tan Boon Heong
Malaysia	Koo Kien Keat
India	V. Diju
Thailand	Nitchaon Jindapol
India	Prajakta Sawant

== 2013 season ==
14 August, 20:00 at Delhi	Delhi Smashers	2 - 3	Pune Pistons
17 August, 16:00 at Lucknow	Delhi Smashers	3 - 2	Hyderabad HotShots
20 August, 18:00 at Mumbai	Delhi Smashers	1 - 4	Mumbai Masters
22 August, 20:00 at Pune	Delhi Smashers	1 - 4	Awadhe Warriors
25 August, 18:00 at Bangalore	Delhi Smashers	4 - 1	Banga Beats

Delhi Smashers failed to qualify for semi-finals and finished fifth in the league table, with 13 points.

== See also ==
- Indian Badminton League
