= Delhi Dashers =

- Sport: Badminton
- Founded: 2016
- Folded: 2019
- League: Premier Badminton League
- Based in: New Delhi
- Home ground: Siri Fort Sports Complex, Delhi
- Colors: Black and Orange
- Owner: Dalmia Cement (Bharat) Ltd
- Head coach: Ajay Kanwar(Season 3)
- Captain: Vladimir Ivanov (Season 3)
- PBL rankings: 1st (2016) & 3rd (2017)
- Website: Under Construction

Delhi Dashers (formerly known as the Delhi Acers) was one of the Badminton teams competing in the Premier Badminton League (PBL). Delhi Dashers have been a part of the PBL since its inception and their best finish arrived in the Season 2 (2016), after defeating Mumbai Rockets in the finals. Owned by Dalmia Cement (Bharat) Ltd., who became the new owners of the franchise from third season onwards, Delhi Dashers finished at the third position in the PBL season III (2017).

Dalmia Cement (Bharat) Ltd. became the new owners of the Delhi Dashers franchise from the third edition (2017–18) of PBL. The franchise was discontinued in 2019 by the owners after feeling that it was not one of their core business.

== Premier Badminton League ==
The Premier Badminton League (PBL), is an annual championship event held in India. Featuring several Indian and international badminton players, the PBL is presently running its fourth edition. The current edition of the PBL will play host to stars like Tommy Sugiarto, Viktor Axelsen, and Son Wan Ho. Nine franchise teams are competing for the PBL cup this year: Ahmedabad Smash Masters, Awadhe Warriors, Bengaluru Raptors, Chennai Smashers, Delhi Dashers, Hyderabad Hunters, Mumbai Rockets, North Eastern Warriors, and Pune 7 Aces.

== History ==
Delhi Dashers (previously Delhi Acers) won the second season of the Premier Badminton League in 2016, after beating the Mumbai Rockets in the final.

In 2017–18, Delhi Dashers reached the semi-finals and finished third in the league.

== Home ground ==
The home ground of Delhi Dashers was Siri Fort Sports Complex, built and maintained by the Delhi Development Authority (DDA).

== 2017-18 squad ==
The 2017-18 Delhi Dashers team was captained by H.S. Prannoy and coached by Ajay Kanwar.

=== Indian players ===
- (India) H.S.Prannoy
- (India) Chirag Sen
- (India) Harika Veludurthi
- (India) Vighnesh Devlekar

=== Foreign players ===
- (Indonesia) Tommy Sugiarto
- (China) Chai Biao
- (Hong Kong) Chia HSIN Lee
- (Russia) Evgeniya Kosteskaya
- (Thailand) Maneepong Jongjit
- (China) Wang Sijie

== 2017-18 statistics ==
Results in the Vodafone Premier Badminton League Season 3 (2017–18)

Year	Played	Wins	Losses	Total Points Won	Rank
2017-18	28	15	13	15	3

== 2018-19 squad ==
- H.S. Prannoy (Men's Singles) (India)
- Tommy Sugiarto (Men's Singles) (Indonesia)
- Evgeniya Kosetskaya (Women's Singles) (Russia)
- Chai Biao (Men's Doubles) (China)
- Wang Sijie (Men's Doubles) (China)
- Maneepong Jongjit (Men's Doubles)
- Lee Chia Hsin (Mixed Doubles)
- Harika Veludurthi (Mixed Doubles) (India)
- Vighnesh Develekar (Men's Doubles) (India)
- Chirag Sen (Men's Singles) (India)

== Ownership ==
Dalmia Cement (Bharat) Ltd Dalmia Cement (Bharat) Ltd (DCBL) was the owner of the Delhi Dashers franchise since 2017–18, the third edition of the Premier Badminton League.

The owners decided to discontinue the team after feeling that it was not one of their core business in 2019.
