= Nandagopal Kidambi =

Indian badminton player (born 1991)

K. Nandagopal
Personal information
- Born: Nandagopal Kidambi; 26 December 1991 (age 34) Guntur, Andhra Pradesh, India

Sport
- Country: India
- Sport: Badminton
- Handedness: Right

Men's & mixed doubles
- Highest ranking: 162 (MS) 3 May 2012; 78 (MD) 24 November 2016; 97 (XD) 25 January 2018
- BWF profile

Nandagopal Kidambi (born 26 December 1991) is an Indian badminton player who competes in men's and mixed doubles.

== Personal life ==
He is the elder brother of Srikanth Kidambi, also an Indian international badminton player.

== Career ==
Nandagopal won the mixed doubles title at the 2013 Maldives International (International Challenge) partnering K. Maneesha. The same year he won the men's doubles at the Bahrain International (International Series) with V. Diju and was runner-up at the Bahrain International Challenge, both finals against K. T. Rupesh Kumar / Sanave Thomas. Earlier, he had been men's doubles runner-up at the 2012 Bahrain International Challenge with Jishnu Sanyal.

In 2017, he completed a "double" at the Kharkiv International (Ukraine), winning the men's doubles with Rohan Kapoor and the mixed doubles with Mahima Aggarwal, and was mixed doubles runner-up at the Malaysia International Series with Aggarwal. In 2018 he won the men's doubles crown at the Iran Fajr International Challenge alongside Alwin Francis.

He has also featured in the Premier Badminton League in India, including for Ahmedabad Smash Masters in the 2018–19 season.

== Achievements ==
=== BWF International Challenge/Series ===
Men's doubles
Year	Tournament	Partner	Opponent	Score	Result
2018	Iran Fajr International	(India) Alwin Francis	(India) Tarun Kona / (India) Saurabh Sharma	9–11, 11–6, 7–11, 11–8, 11–9	(gold) Winner
2017	Kharkiv International	(India) Rohan Kapoor	(India) Alwin Francis / (India) Tarun Kona	18–21, 24–22, 21–18	(gold) Winner
2013	Bahrain International Challenge	(India) V. Diju	(India) K. T. Rupesh Kumar / (India) Sanave Thomas	Walkover	(silver) Runner-up
2013	Bahrain International	(India) V. Diju	(India) K. T. Rupesh Kumar / (India) Sanave Thomas	21–17, 12–21, 21–19	(gold) Winner
2012	Bahrain International Challenge	(India) Jishnu Sanyal	(India) K. T. Rupesh Kumar / (India) Sanave Thomas	18–21, 21–19, 18–21	(silver) Runner-up

Mixed doubles
Year	Tournament	Partner	Opponent	Score	Result
2017	Kharkiv International	(India) Mahima Aggarwal	(India) Saurabh Sharma / (India) Anoushka Parikh	21–14, 21–15	(gold) Winner
2017	Malaysia International Series	(India) Mahima Aggarwal	(Indonesia) Yantoni Edy Saputra / (Indonesia) Marsheilla Gischa Islami	19–21, 9–21	(silver) Runner-up
2013	Maldives International	(India) K. Maneesha	(South Korea) Kim Dae-sung / (South Korea) Oh Bo-kyung	21–16, 23–21	(gold) Winner

BWF International Challenge tournament
BWF International Series tournament
BWF Future Series tournament
