= Premier Badminton League =

Badminton league in India

- Most recent season or competition: 2020 Premier Badminton League
- Formerly: Indian Badminton League
- Sport: Badminton
- Founded: 2016
- Administrator: Badminton Association of India
- No. of teams: 9
- Country: India
- Most recent champion: Bengaluru Raptors (2020)
- Most titles: Bengaluru Raptors (2018–19, 2020)
- Broadcasters: List of broadcasters
- Streaming partner: JioCinema
- Sponsor: Star Sports
- Tournament format: Round-robin; Knock-out
- Website: pbl-india.com

Premier Badminton League, aka PBL, is a team badminton league operating in India. It was launched in 2016 and is one of the top badminton leagues in the world. It features nine state or city-based franchise teams and the top Indian and international badminton talent. The league has reached an audience of more than 100 million through television, on-ground support, and social media. The league has hosted 5 seasons. In 2025, the Badminton Association of India revealed their plans to restart the league with a new name and a different format.

The first season of PBL was held from 2 to 17 January 2016. Delhi Dashers, formerly Delhi Acers, defeated Mumbai Rockets in the final to clinch the title. The second season began on 22 December 2016 and came to end on 14 January 2017 with the Chennai Smashers headed by P. V. Sindhu clinching the title in the finals. The third season began on 23 December 2017 and came to end on 14 January 2018 with Hyderabad Hunters headed by Carolina Marín emerging as the champions. Bengaluru Raptors won the last two editions in 2018–19 and 2020, becoming the only team to win the title twice.

== Background ==
=== Tournament format ===
Teams play each other in round-robin format in league stage. Each team plays six ties in the league stage in which each tie consists of five matches. The matches played are two Men's singles, Women's singles, Men's doubles and Mixed doubles. Each of these matches are best of 3 games. Teams earn one point for each regular match win; in addition, each team must choose a Trump match, where a win is worth two points, and a loss subtracts one point. After league stage, the top four teams in the table will qualify for the knockout stage. The winners of semi-finals goes into the final, in which the winner will be crowned the PBL champions.

=== Player auctions ===
The player auctions are usually held at the end of each year for the subsequent season. Professional players from around the world enter the bidding where teams buy them. The league has helped players more than double their annual earnings from prize money in the year 2018. As per Danish player Victor Axelsen, this was a crucial part of their annual income. Each franchise has a purse of ₹2 crore (US$210,000) and the maximum a team can spend on a single player was ₹77 lakh (US$80,000) in the most recent 2020 auction.

The fifth season auctions were held on 26 November 2019 in New Delhi. Each franchise had a purse of ₹2 crore (US$210,000), and were not allowed to spend more than ₹77 lakh (US$80,000) on a single player. The highest paid players were the Taiwanese Tai Tzu-ying and Indian P. V. Sindhu, both sold for the maximum amount of ₹77 lakh (US$80,000) to Bengaluru Raptors and Hyderabad Hunters respectively. Indian doubles player Satwiksairaj Rankireddy was the next highest, bought for ₹62 lakh (US$64,000) by Chennai Superstarz. 2020 being the Olympic year, key players like Saina Nehwal, Kidambi Srikanth, Carolina Marín, Victor Axelsen and others have decided to skip the season. Some of the players were traded between Mumbai, Chennai and Pune teams ahead of the season.

== Teams ==
Currently seven teams compete in the badminton league. Previously, there were nine teams, during 2018–19.

Locations of the seven PBL teams

Team	City	Highest Paid Male	Highest Paid Female	Home Ground
Hyderabad Hunters	Hyderabad	(India) Sourabh Verma	(India) P. V. Sindhu	Gachibowli Indoor Stadium
Bengaluru Raptors	Bangalore	(India) B. Sai Praneeth	(Chinese Taipei) Tai Tzu-ying	Koramangala Indoor Stadium
Awadhe Warriors	Lucknow	(South Korea) Ko Sung-hyun	(United States) Beiwen Zhang	Babu Banarasi Das Indoor Stadium
Mumbai Rockets	Mumbai	(South Korea) Kim Gi-jung	(Indonesia) Pia Zebadiah Bernadet	Sardar Vallabhbhai Patel Indoor Stadium
Chennai Superstarz	Chennai	(India) Satwiksairaj Rankireddy	(England) Jessica Pugh	Jawaharlal Nehru Stadium
Northeastern Warriors	Guwahati	(Hong Kong) Lee Cheuk Yiu	(South Korea) Kim Ha-na	Karmabir Nabin Chandra Bordoloi Indoor Stadium
Pune 7 Aces	Pune	(Indonesia) Hendra Setiawan	(England) Gabby Adcock	Shree Shiv Chhatrapati Sports Complex

== Seasons ==
=== Season 1 ===
In 2016, the league was renamed from Indian Badminton League to Premier Badminton League, and still followed same format. This first season of the PBL started on 2 January 2016 and concluded on 17 January 2016. The four teams to proceed to the semi-finals were Delhi Dashers, Chennai Smashers, Awadhe Warriors and Mumbai Rockets. Delhi beat Chennai 4-3 and Mumbai Rockets beat Awadhe Warriors 3–1 to proceed to the final. Delhi Dashers won the tournament after beating Mumbai Rockets 4–3.

=== Season 2 ===
The second season of the Premier Badminton League started on 1 January 2017 and concluded on 14 January 2017. It followed the same format as the earlier league, and the four teams to proceed to the semi-finals were Awadhe Warriors, Mumbai Rockets, Chennai Smashers and Hyderabad Hunters. Chennai Smashers beat Awadhe Warriors 4-1 and Mumbai Rockets beat Hyderabad Hunters 3-(-1) to proceed to the final. Chennai Smashers won the tournament after beating Mumbai Rockets 4–3.

=== Season 3 ===
The third season of the PBL started on 23 December 2017 and concluded on 14 January 2018. Hyderabad Hunters were crowned the champions after they beat Bengaluru Blasters 4–3 in the final tie.

=== Season 4 ===
The fourth season of the PBL was played from 22 December 2018 to 13 January 2019. In the fourth season Bengaluru Raptors took their first title after beating Mumbai Rockets in the final.

=== Season 5 ===
The fifth season of the PBL started on 20 January 2020 and concluded on 9 February 2020. Seven teams participated in the season. Delhi Dashers and Ahmedabad Smash Masters did not participate in this edition. Total prize money of ₹6 crore (equivalent to ₹7.7 crore or US$800,000 in 2026) was announced by Sportzlive for the tournament. Bengaluru Raptors beat Northeastern Warriors 4–2 in the finals to win their second title. It was also their second consecutive title in PBL.

== Editions and results ==
Five seasons of Premier Badminton League have been played since the first season back in 2016. Here are the results.

Season	Year(s)	Final			Venue	Teams
Season	Year(s)	Winner	Result	Runner-up	Venue	Teams
1	2016 Details	Delhi Acers	4–3	Mumbai Rockets	DDA Badminton and Squash Stadium, New Delhi	6
2	2017 Details	Chennai Smashers	4–3	Mumbai Rockets	DDA Badminton and Squash Stadium, New Delhi	6
3	2017–18 Details	Hyderabad Hunters	4–3	Bengaluru Blasters	Kanteerava Indoor Stadium, Bangalore	8
4	2018–19 Details	Bengaluru Raptors	4–3	Mumbai Rockets	Kanteerava Indoor Stadium, Bangalore	9
5	2020 Details	Bengaluru Raptors	4–2	Northeastern Warriors	Gachibowli Indoor Stadium, Hyderabad	7

== Performance table ==
Seasons	Season 1	Season 2	Season 3	Season 4	Season 5
Teams	6	6	8	9	7
Hyderabad Hunters	5th	SF	1st	SF	6th
Bengaluru Raptors	6th	5th	2nd	1st	1st
Awadhe Warriors	SF	SF	5th	SF	5th
Mumbai Rockets	2nd	2nd	8th	2nd	7th
Chennai Superstarz	SF	1st	6th	6th	SF
Northeastern Warriors	DNE		7th	8th	2nd
Pune 7 Aces	DNE			5th	SF
Delhi Dashers	1st	6th	SF	9th	DEF
Ahmedabad Smash Masters^{†}	DNE		SF	7th	DEF

1st	Champions
2nd	Runner-up
SF	Semi-finalists
DNE	Team did not exist in the respective season
DEF	Team defunct
^{†}	Teams that no longer exist

=== Notes ===
- Bengaluru Raptors was formerly Bengaluru Top Guns and Bengaluru Blasters.
- Chennai Superstarz was formerly Chennai Smashers.
- Delhi Dashers was formerly Delhi Acers.

== Team squad ==
Season 1

Delhi Acers	Hyderabad Hunters	Mumbai Rockets	Awadhe Warriors	Bengaluru Blasters	Chennai Smashers
(India) Ajay Jayaram	(India) Siril Verma	(India) Prannoy H. S.	(India) B. Sai Praneeth	(India) Anand Pawar	(France) Brice Leverdez
(England) Rajiv Ouseph	(India) Parupalli Kashyap	(India) Gurusai Dutt	(India) Sourabh Verma	(India) Sameer Verma	(Indonesia) Sony Dwi Kuncoro
(Indonesia) Tommy Sugiarto	(Malaysia) Lee Chong Wei	(India) Ruthvika Gadde	(Thailand) Tanongsak Saensomboonsuk	(India) Srikanth Kidambi	(Indonesia) Simon Santoso
(India) P. C. Thulasi	(Thailand) Supanida Katethong	(China) Han Li	(India) Saina Nehwal	(China) Suo Di	(India) P.V. Sindhu
(India) Shikha Gautam	(India) K. Nandagopal	(China) Liu Zi Jie	(India) Vrushali Gummadi	(India) B. Sumeeth Reddy	(India) Sri Krishna Priya
(India) Akshay Dewalkar	(India) Satwiksairaj Rankireddy	(India) Manu Attri	(China) Cai Yun	(Malaysia) Tan Boon Heong	(India) Pranav Chopra
(Malaysia) Koo Kien Keat	(Indonesia) Markis Kido	(Thailand) Chayut Triyachart	(Indonesia) Hendra Gunawan	(Malaysia) Koo Kien Keat	(England) Chris Adcock
(Malaysia) Tan Boon Heong	(Denmark) Carsten Mogensen	(Russia) Vladimir Ivanov	(Thailand) Bodin Isara	(Denmark) Joachim Fischer Nielsen	(Canada) Toby Ng
(India) Aparna Balan	(India) Jwala Gutta	(Denmark) Mathias Boe	(India) K. Maneesha	(Scotland) Robert Blair	(India) N. Sikki Reddy
(England) Gabby Adcock	(India) J. Meghana	(Denmark) Kamilla Rytter Juhl	(Denmark) Christinna Pedersen	(India) Ashwini Ponnappa	(Indonesia) Pia Zebadiah Bernadet

Season 2

Delhi Acers	Awadhe Warriors	Mumbai Rockets	Hyderabad Hunters	Bengaluru Blasters	Chennai Smashers
(Denmark) Jan Ø. Jørgensen	(India) Srikanth Kidambi	(India) Ajay Jayaram	(India) B. Sai Praneeth	(Denmark) Viktor Axelsen	(India) P. V. Sindhu
(India) Siril Verma	(Hong Kong) Wong Wing Ki	(India) Prannoy H. S.	(India) Sameer Verma	(India) Sourabh Varma	(India) Arundhati Pantawane
(South Korea) Son Wan-ho	(India) Saina Nehwal	(India) Shreyansh Jaiswal	(England) Rajiv Ouseph	(Thailand) Boonsak Ponsana	(India) Parupalli Kashyap
(India) Aakarshi Kashyap	(India) Rituparna Das	(South Korea) Sung Ji-hyun	(Spain) Carolina Marín	(India) Ruthvika Gadde	(Thailand) Tanongsak Saensomboonsuk
(Thailand) Nitchaon Jindapol	(Thailand) Bodin Isara	(India) Vrushali Gummadi	(India) Sri Krishna Priya	(Hong Kong) Cheung Ngan Yi	(Indonesia) Tommy Sugiarto
(India) Akshay Dewalkar	(Malaysia) Goh V Shem	(Thailand) Nipitphon Phuangphuapet	(India) Satwiksairaj Rankireddy	(India) N. Sikki Reddy	(England) Gabby Adcock
(Russia) Ivan Sozonov	(Indonesia) Markis Kido	(India) Mohita Sahdev	(Malaysia) Tan Boon Heong	(India) Ashwini Ponnappa	(India) Ramya Tulasi
(Russia) Vladimir Ivanov	(India) Prajakta Sawant	(Poland) Nadieżda Zięba	(Malaysia) Tan Wee Kiong	(India) Pranav Chopra	(India) B. Sumeeth Reddy
(India) Jwala Gutta	(Thailand) Savitree Amitrapai	(India) Chirag Shetty	(Hong Kong) Chau Hoi Wah	(South Korea) Ko Sung-hyun	(England) Chris Adcock
(India) K. Maneesha	(India) Aditya Joshi	(South Korea) Lee Yong-dae	(India) Meghana Jakkampudi	(South Korea) Yoo Yeon-seong	(Denmark) Mads Pieler Kolding
		(India) Sanjana Santosh			
		(India) Tarun Kona			

Season 3

Ahmedabad Smash Masters	Awadhe Warriors	Bengaluru Blasters	Chennai Smashers
(India) Prannoy H. S.	(India) Saina Nehwal	(Denmark) Viktor Axelsen	(India) P. V. Sindhu
(India) K. Nandagopal	(Denmark) Christinna Pedersen	(Malaysia) Chong Wei Feng	(India) Aditya Joshi
(Denmark) Kamilla Rytter Juhl	(India) Harshit Aggarwal	(South Korea) Kim Sa-rang	(India) B. Sumeeth Reddy
(Taiwan) Tai Tzu-ying	(Indonesia) Hendra Setiawan	(Scotland) Kirsty Gilmour	(France) Brice Leverdez
(Hong Kong) Lee Chun Hei	(India) Srikanth Kidambi	(India) Manu Attri	(England) Chris Adcock
(India) Siril Verma	(India) Mahima Aggarwal	(Denmark) Mathias Boe	(India) Daniel Farid
(India) Sourabh Varma	(Hong Kong) Or Chin Chung	(India) N. Sikki Reddy	(England) Gabby Adcock
(India) Sri Krishna Priya	(India) Parupalli Kashyap	(India) Rituparna Das	(Thailand) Tanongsak Saensomboonsuk
(Bulgaria) Stefani Stoeva	(India) Sai Uttejita Rao Chukka	(India) Sanjana Santosh	(India) Vrushali Gummadi
(Hong Kong) Law Cheuk Him	(Hong Kong) Tang Chun Man	(India) Subhankar Dey	(Taiwan) Lee Yang
Delhi Dashers	Hyderabad Hunters	Mumbai Rockets	North Eastern Warriors
(South Korea) Sung Ji-hyun	(Spain) Carolina Marín	(South Korea) Son Wan-ho	(Taiwan) Wang Tzu-wei
(India) Arathi Sara Sunil	(India) Anoushka Parikh	(India) Arjun M. R.	(India) Ajay Jayaram
(India) Ashwini Ponnappa	(India) B. Sai Praneeth	(United States) Beiwen Zhang	(India) Chirag Shetty
(Russia) Ivan Sozonov	(South Korea) Lee Hyun-il	(Malaysia) Tan Boon Heong	(India) Ruthvika Gadde
(India) Pranav Chopra	(Indonesia) Markis Kido	(Bulgaria) Gabriela Stoeva	(South Korea) Kim Gi-jung
(India) Gurusai Dutt	(Indonesia) Pia Zebadiah Bernadet	(India) Tarun Kona	(Canada) Michelle Li
(India) Shreyanshi Pardeshi	(India) Rahul Yadav Chittaboina	(India) Kuhoo Garg	(India) Prajakta Sawant
(China) Tian Houwei	(India) Rasika Raje	(South Korea) Lee Yong-dae	(India) Pratul Joshi
(Russia) Vladimir Ivanov	(India) Satwiksairaj Rankireddy	(India) Sameer Verma	(India) Sanyogita Ghorpade
(Hong Kong) Wong Wing Ki	(South Korea) Yoo Yeon-seong	(India) Sanyam Shukla	(South Korea) Shin Baek-cheol

Season 4

Ahmedabad Smash Masters	Awadhe Warriors	Bengaluru Raptors
(Denmark) Viktor Axelsen	(South Korea) Son Wan-ho	(India) Srikanth Kidambi
(India) Anoushka Parikh	(India) Ashwini Ponnappa	(Indonesia) Mohammad Ahsan
(India) N. Sikki Reddy	(Denmark) Mathias Christiansen	(Indonesia) Hendra Setiawan
(India) Satwiksairaj Rankireddy	(Taiwan) Lee Yang	(India) B. Sai Praneeth
(Hong Kong) Lee Chun Hei	(United States) Beiwen Zhang	(India) Mithun Manjunath
(India) K. Nandagopal	(South Korea) Lee Dong-keun	(England) Lauren Smith
(Scotland) Kirsty Gilmour	(India) Sanyogita Ghorpade	(India) Sanjana Santosh
(India) Vaishnavi Bhale	(India) Gurusai Dutt	(England) Marcus Ellis
(Malaysia) Liew Daren	(India) Rasika Raje	(Vietnam) Vũ Thị Trang
(India) Sourabh Varma	(India) Arjun M. R.	(Vietnam) Nguyễn Tiến Minh
Chennai Smashers	Delhi Dashers	Hyderabad Hunters
(South Korea) Sung Ji-hyun	(India) Prannoy H. S.	(India) P. V. Sindhu
(England) Gabby Adcock	(China) Chai Biao	(South Korea) Eom Hye-won
(England) Chris Adcock	(China) Wang Sijie	(South Korea) Kim Sa-rang
(India) Rutaparna Panda	(Thailand) Maneepong Jongjit	(Thailand) Bodin Isara
(India) B. Sumeeth Reddy	(Russia) Evgeniya Kosetskaya	(India) Sai Uttejita Rao Chukka
(India) Saili Rane	(Indonesia) Tommy Sugiarto	(South Korea) Lee Hyun-il
(England) Rajiv Ouseph	(India) Harika Veludurthi	(India) Arun George
(India) Parupalli Kashyap	(India) Vighnesh Devlekar	(India) Meghana Jakkampudi
(Hong Kong) Or Chin Chung	(India) Chirag Sen	(Netherlands) Mark Caljouw
(Malaysia) Chong Wei Feng	(Chinese Taipei) Lee Chia-hsin	(India) Rahul Yadav Chittaboina
Mumbai Rockets	North Eastern Warriors	Pune 7 Aces
(South Korea) Lee Yong-dae	(India) Saina Nehwal	(Spain) Carolina Marín
(Indonesia) Pia Zebadiah Bernadet	(South Korea) Kim Ha-na	(India) Chirag Shetty
(South Korea) Kim Gi-jung	(South Korea) Yoo Yeon-seong	(Denmark) Mathias Boe
(India) Shreyanshi Pardeshi	(Thailand) Tanongsak Saensomboonsuk	(Russia) Vladimir Ivanov
(India) Sameer Verma	(China) Tian Houwei	(Denmark) Line Kjærsfeldt
(India) Kuhoo Garg	(India) K. Maneesha	(India) Lakshya Sen
(India) Manu Attri	(Chinese Taipei) Liao Min-chun	(France) Brice Leverdez
(Denmark) Anders Antonsen	(India) Dhruv Kapila	(Indonesia) Sony Dwi Kuncoro
(India) Pratul Joshi	(India) Siril Verma	(India) Ajay Jayaram
(India) Anura Prabhudesai	(India) Rituparna Das	(India) Prajakta Sawant

Season 5

Teams	Awadhe Warriors	Bengaluru Raptors	Chennai Superstarz	Hyderabad Hunters	Mumbai Rockets	Northeastern Warriors	Pune 7 Aces
Coach	(India) Anup Sridhar	(India) Arvind Bhat	(India) Vijaydeep Singh	(India) Rajendra Kumar Jakkampudi	(India) Amrish Shinde	(Indonesia) Edwin Iriawan	(Denmark) Joachim Persson
Squads	(India) Ajay Jayaram	(India) Ansal Yadav	(India) B. Sumeeth Reddy	(India) Ruthvika Gadde	(India) Kuhoo Garg	(India) Ashmita Chaliha	(India) Arjun M. R.
Squads	(India) Subhankar Dey	(India) Arun George	(India) Dhruv Kapila	(India) N. Sikki Reddy	(India) Parupalli Kashyap	(India) Kaushal Dharmamer	(India) Chirag Shetty
Squads	(India) Tanvi Lad	(India) B. Sai Praneeth	(India) Gayatri Gopichand	(India) Priyanshu Rajawat	(India) Pranav Chopra	(India) Krishna Prasad Garaga	(India) Mithun Manjunath
Squads		(India) Medha Shashidharan	(India) Lakshya Sen	(India) P. V. Sindhu	(India) Ramchandran Shlok	(India) Rutaparna Panda	(India) Rituparna Das
Squads			(India) Sankar Subramanian	(India) Sourabh Verma	(India) Shreyansh Jaiswal		
Squads			(India) Sanjana Santosh		(India) Shreyanshi Pardeshi		
Squads			(India) Sathish Kumar Karunakaran				
Squads			(India) Satwiksairaj Rankireddy				
Squads	(Denmark) Christinna Pedersen	(Chinese Taipei) Tai Tzu-ying	(England) Jessica Pugh	(England) Ben Lane	(Indonesia) Pia Zebadiah Bernadet	(Canada) Michelle Li	(England) Chris Adcock
Squads	(Hong Kong) Wong Wing Ki	(France) Brice Leverdez	(Indonesia) Tommy Sugiarto	(England) Sean Vendy	(South Korea) Kim Gi-jung	(Hong Kong) Lee Cheuk Yiu	(England) Gabby Adcock
Squads	(Russia) Ivan Sozonov	(Indonesia) Rian Agung Saputro	(Scotland) Kirsty Gilmour	(Malaysia) Liew Daren	(South Korea) Kim Sa-rang	(South Korea) Kim Ha-na	(Hong Kong) Tse Ying Suet
Squads	(South Korea) Ko Sung-hyun	(Malaysia) Chan Peng Soon		(Russia) Vladimir Ivanov	(South Korea) Lee Dong-keun	(South Korea) Lee Yong-dae	(Indonesia) Hendra Setiawan
Squads	(South Korea) Shin Baek-cheol	(South Korea) Eom Hye-won				(Thailand) Bodin Isara	(Japan) Kazumasa Sakai
Squads	(United States) Beiwen Zhang					(Thailand) Tanongsak Saensomboonsuk	(Singapore) Loh Kean Yew
Squads							(Vietnam) Vũ Thị Trang

== Broadcast rights ==
In 2013 Star Sports purchased the broadcasting rights for India.

Winning bidder	Regional broadcast rights	Terms of deal
Star Sports	India	2013-2025
Fox Sports	Hong Kong	2013-2020
Sky Sports	United Kingdom	2013-2030
ESPN	United States	2013-2023
Hotstar	Worldwide digital rights	2016–present

== See also ==
- Indian Premier League
- Indian Super League
- Hockey India League
- Tennis Premier League
- Prime Volleyball League
- Pro Kabaddi League
- Ultimate Table Tennis
- Ultimate Kho Kho
- Premier Handball League
