= Ajay Jayaram =

Indian badminton player (born 1987)

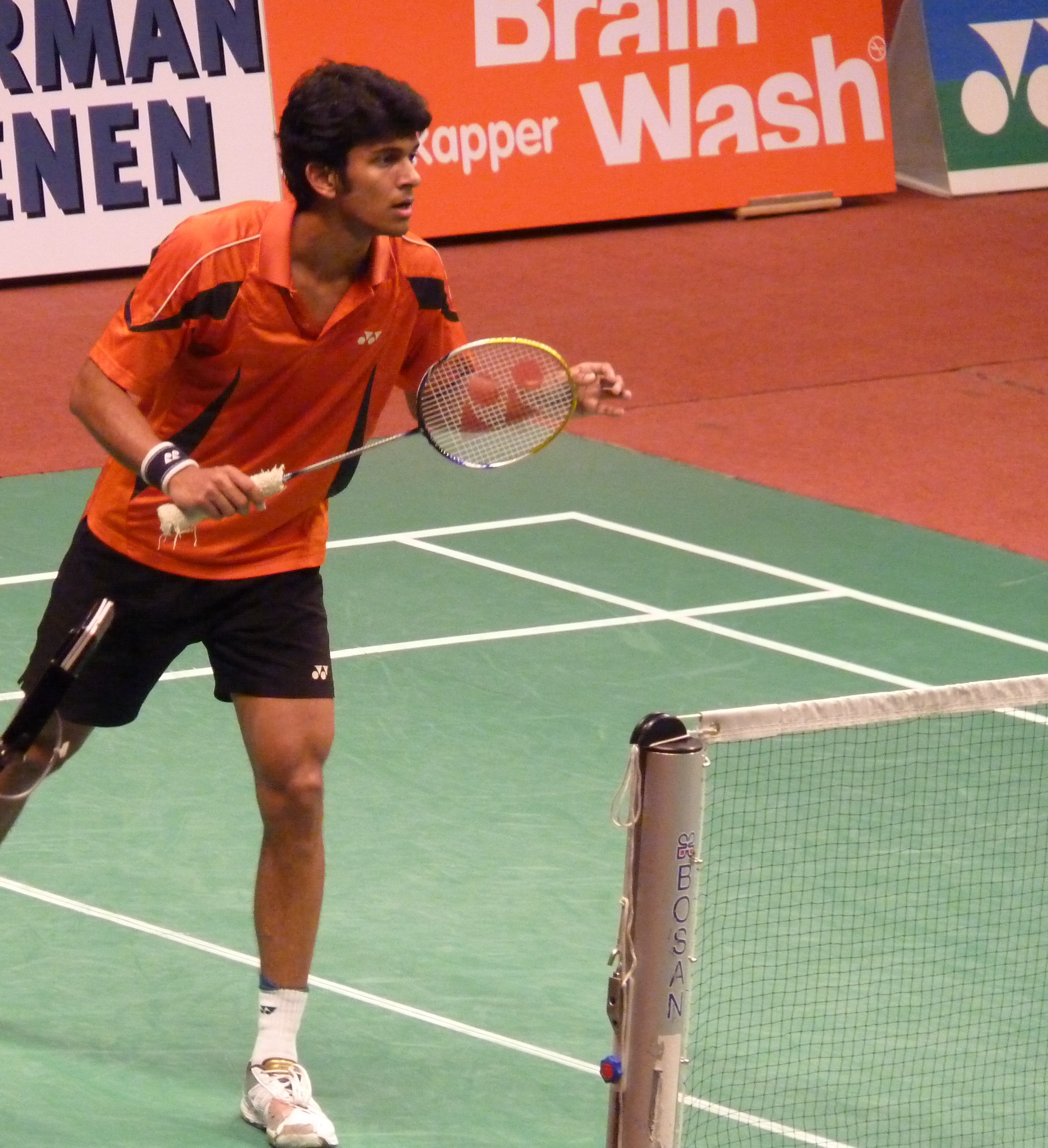

Personal information
- Born: 28 September 1987 (age 39) Chennai, India
- Height: 1.80 m (5 ft 11 in)

Sport
- Country: India
- Sport: Badminton
- Handedness: Right
- Coached by: Anup Sridhar
- Retired: 26 March 2022

Men's singles
- Highest ranking: 13 (25 May 2017)
- BWF profile
Medal record
Men's badminton
Representing India
Asia Team Championships
Bronze medal – third place	2016 Hyderabad	Men's team

Ajay Jayaram (born 28 September 1987) is an Indian retired badminton player from Chennai. He plays for the Mumbai Rockets in the Premier Badminton League. Jayaram is a champion of the Czech International and Dutch Open tournament. Ajay Jayaram did his schooling from Our Lady of Perpetual Succour High School. He retired from the international badminton on 26 March 2022 to pursue MBA from ISB, Hyderabad. Ajay Jayaram married Soumya Ravi on April 6, 2022.

== Achievements ==
=== BWF World Tour (1 runner-up) ===
The BWF World Tour, which was announced on 19 March 2017 and implemented in 2018, is a series of elite badminton tournaments sanctioned by the Badminton World Federation (BWF). The BWF World Tours are divided into levels of World Tour Finals, Super 1000, Super 750, Super 500, Super 300 (part of the HSBC World Tour), and the BWF Tour Super 100.

Men's singles
Year	Tournament	Level	Opponent	Score	Result
2018	Vietnam Open	Super 100	(Indonesia) Shesar Hiren Rhustavito	14–21, 10–21	(silver) Runner-up

=== BWF Superseries (1 runner-up) ===
The BWF Superseries, which was launched on 14 December 2006 and implemented in 2007, was a series of elite badminton tournaments, sanctioned by the Badminton World Federation (BWF). BWF Superseries levels were Superseries and Superseries Premier. A season of Superseries consisted of twelve tournaments around the world that had been introduced since 2011. Successful players were invited to the Superseries Finals, which were held at the end of each year.

Men's singles
Year	Tournament	Opponent	Score	Result
2015	Korea Open	(China) Chen Long	14–21, 13–21	(silver) Runner-up

BWF Super Series Finals tournament
BWF Super Series Premier tournament
BWF Super Series tournament

=== BWF Grand Prix (2 titles, 2 runners-up) ===
The BWF Grand Prix had two levels, the Grand Prix and Grand Prix Gold. It was a series of badminton tournaments sanctioned by the Badminton World Federation (BWF) and played between 2007 and 2017.

Men's singles
Year	Tournament	Opponent	Score	Result
2010	Dutch Open	(Japan) Sho Sasaki	16–21, 19–21	(silver) Runner-up
2014	Dutch Open	(Indonesia) Ihsan Maulana Mustofa	10–11, 11–6, 11–7, 1–11, 11–9	(gold) Winner
2015	Dutch Open	(Estonia) Raul Must	21–12, 21–18	(gold) Winner
2016	Dutch Open	(Chinese Taipei) Wang Tzu-wei	10–21, 21–17, 18–21	(silver) Runner-up

BWF Grand Prix Gold tournament
BWF Grand Prix tournament

=== BWF International Challenge/Series (3 titles, 3 runners-up) ===
Men's singles
Year	Tournament	Opponent	Score	Result
2008	North Shore City International	(New Zealand) John Moody	16–21, 20–22	(silver) Runner-up
2008	Waikato International	(India) Prakash Jolly	21–11, 21–14	(gold) Winner
2010	Smiling Fish International	(Malaysia) Iskandar Zulkarnain Zainuddin	21–10, 21–4	(gold) Winner
2010	Czech International	(Republic of Ireland) Scott Evans	21–11, 21–8	(gold) Winner
2018	White Nights	(Spain) Pablo Abián	21–11, 16–21, 17–21	(silver) Runner-up
2021	Belgian International	(Malaysia) Ng Tze Yong	14–21, 14–21	(silver) Runner-up

BWF International Challenge tournament
BWF International Series tournament
