= Mumbai Rockets =

- Sport: Badminton
- Founded: 2013
- League: Premier Badminton League
- Based in: Mumbai, India
- Home ground: National Sports Club of India
- Colors: Blue
- Owner: Bombay Badminton Pvt. Ltd.
- Head coach: Amrish Shinde
- Captain: Parupalli Kashyap
- PBL wins: none
- Website: mumbairockets.net

Mumbai Rockets is a franchise badminton team representing Mumbai in the Premier Badminton League (PBL). The franchise is owned by Bombay Badminton Pvt. Ltd. The team's home ground is The National Sports Club Of India, Mumbai. The team is captained by Parupalli Kashyap, and coached by Amrish Shinde.

== Current squad ==
=== Indian players ===
(India) Kuhoo Garg
(India) Parupalli Kashyap
(India) Pranav Chopra
(India) Ramchandran Shlok
(India) Shreyansh Jaiswal
(India) Shreyanshi Pardeshi

=== Foreign players ===
(Indonesia) Pia Zebadiah Bernadet
(South Korea) Kim Gi-jung
(South Korea) Kim Sa-rang
(South Korea) Lee Dong-keun
