= National Sports Club of India =

The National Sports Club of India (NSCI) is a twin-city based sports club with branches in Mumbai and Delhi, India.

Sardar Vallabhbhai Patel Indoor Stadium is an indoor sports arena that seats 5,000 people. The stadium was established in 1957 and the foundation stone was laid by former Chief Minister of Maharashtra Yashwantrao Chavan and the facility is administered by National Sports Club of India. It includes the facilities for tennis, badminton, billiards, table tennis, carrom and wrestling.

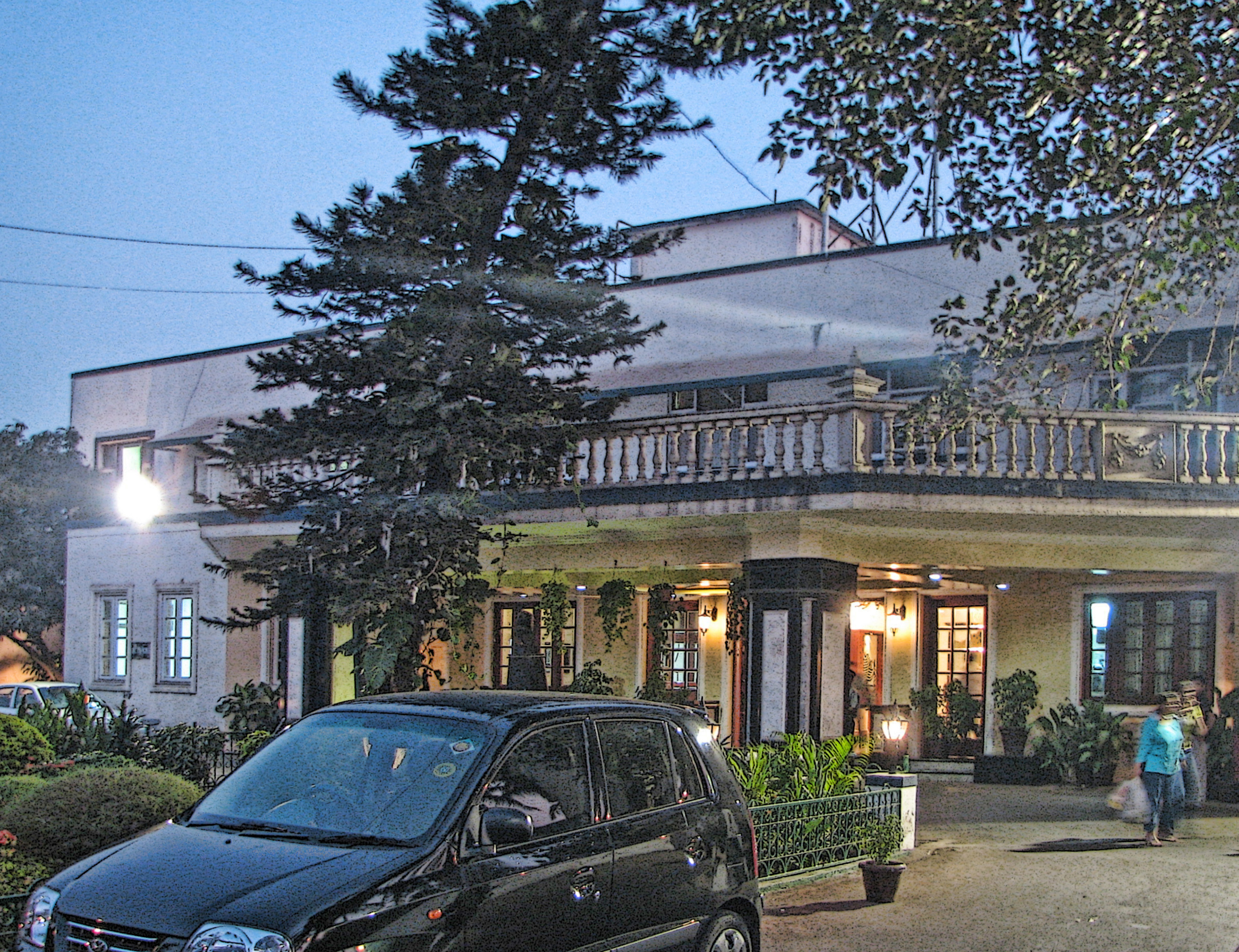
The entrance to the NSCI premises in Mumbai

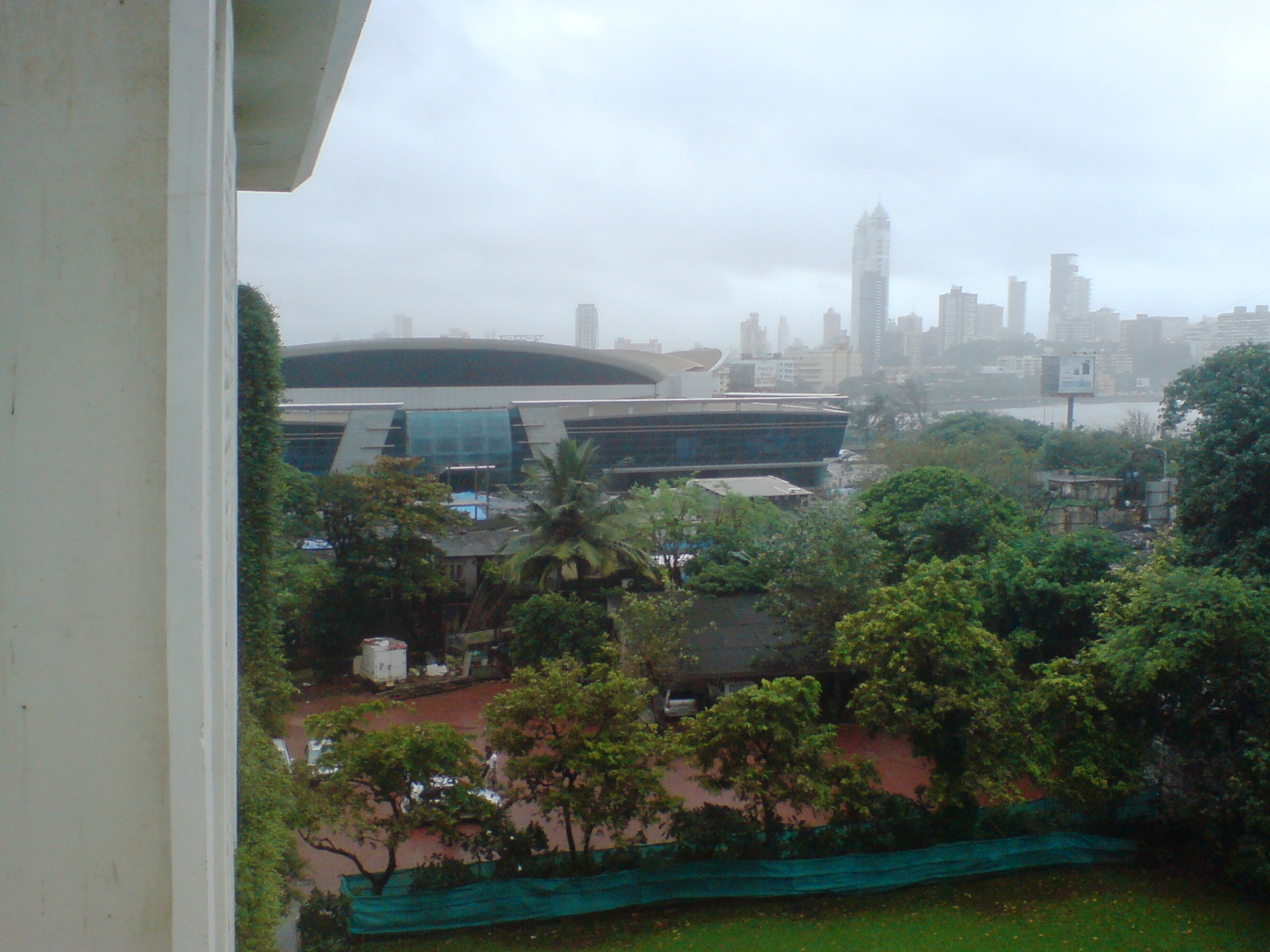
Sardar Patel Stadium, NSCI Mumbai
