= Anup Sridhar =

Indian badminton player

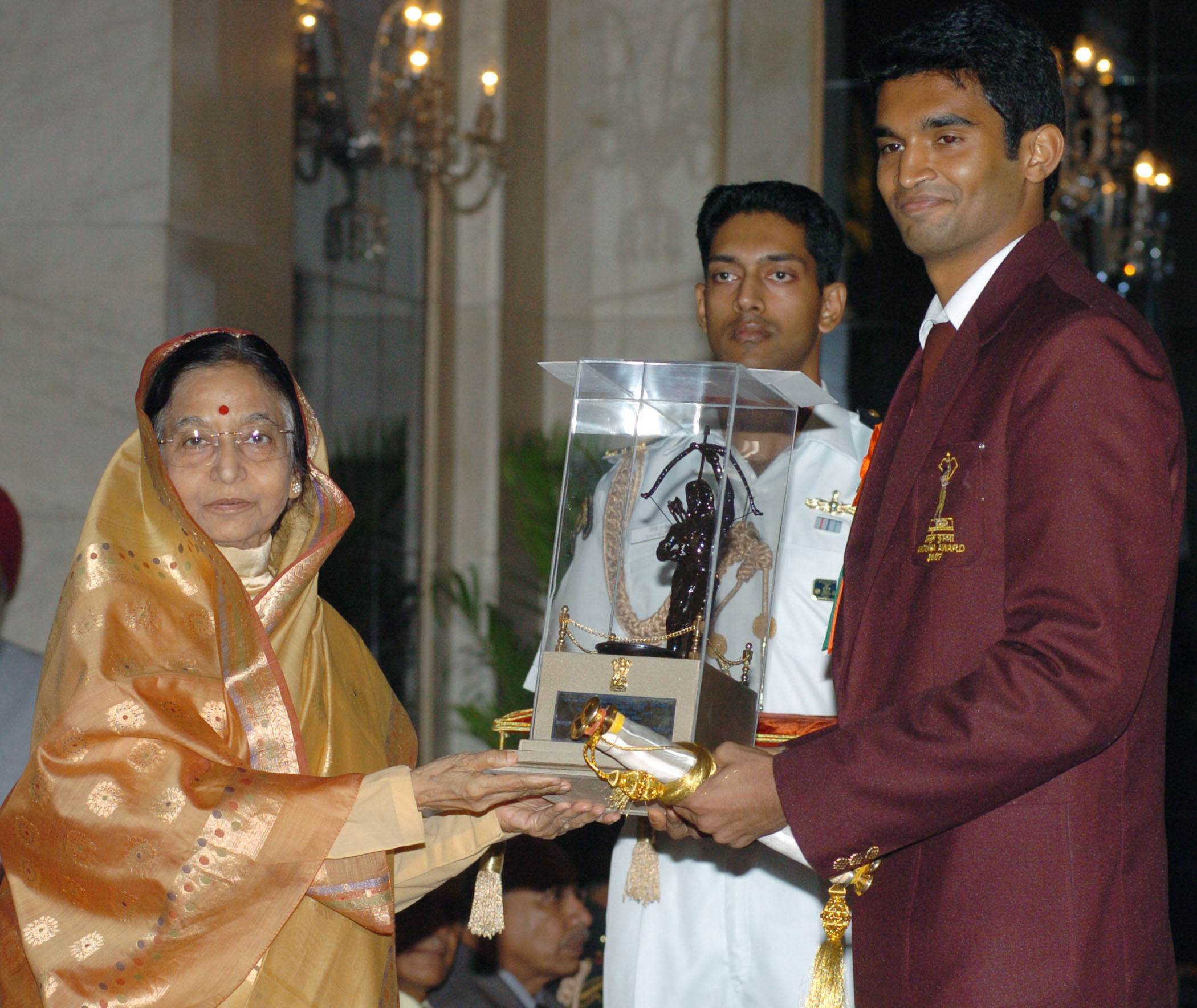
- The President, Pratibha Devisingh Patil presenting the “Arjuna” Award – 2007, to Anup Sridhar (right), in New Delhi on August 29, 2008.

Personal information
- Born: 11 April 1983 (age 43) Bangalore, Karnataka, India
- Height: 1.89 m (6 ft 2 in)

Sport
- Country: India
- Sport: Badminton
- Handedness: Right
- Coached by: Prakash Padukone; U. Vimal Kumar; Tom John

Men's singles
- Highest ranking: 24 (14 January 2010)
- BWF profile
Medal record
Badminton
Representing India
Commonwealth Games
Bronze medal – third place	2006 Melbourne	Mixed team
Asian Championships
Bronze medal – third place	2007 Johor Bahru	Men's singles

Anup Sridhar (born 11 April 1983) is an Indian retired badminton player.

== Career ==
Anup Sridhar is India's Thomas Cup captain. He completed his education from Jain University, Bangalore. Anup's best year on tour so far was 2007 during which he ended the year as the top Indian badminton player with a ranking of 25. His highest world ranking of 24 was achieved in early 2008. National Champion 2005, and 2006. India #1 2005, 2006, 2007 and 2008.

Anup has reached the semifinals at the German Open and the Asian Badminton Championships as well as the quarterfinals at the Thailand Open and the 2007 World Championships.

His most famous win was the one over Taufik Hidayat – former world no. 1, gold medalist at the 2004 Athens Olympics and 2005 World Champion – at the World Championships in what was one of the longest matches of the tournament. Anup's performance at the World Championships was rated among the top 10 Indian sporting performances of 2007.

Anup started 2008 by winning the prestigious Pramod Mahajan All-India ranking tournament in New Delhi. He followed that up by reaching the pre-quarterfinals, one round better than last year, of the Proton Malaysia Super Series where he lost to Hyun Il Lee, the eventual runner-up.

He contested in the men's singles event at the 2008 Summer Olympics in Beijing. He defeated Marco Vasconcelos of Portugal in the round of 64 by 21-16, 21-14. But in round of 16, he lost to Shoji Sato of Japan by 13-21, 17-21.

Anup won his 4th career title at the 2013 Yonex Czech International tournament, beating Indra Bagus Ade Chandra of Italy 21-11 21-16 in 30 minutes.

== Vodafone Indian Badminton League ==
Anup Sridhar represented Pune Pistons at the inaugural Vodafone Indian Badminton League in 2013, with salary of USD 6,000 dollars. He won his only match played in the entire season against Hu Yun, ranked 8th in the world who represented Banga Beats, 21-12 21-18. With the win, he was the Vodafone Player of the Tie.

== Achievements ==
=== Asian Championships ===
Men's singles
Year	Venue	Opponent	Score	Result
2007	Stadium Bandaraya Johor Bahru; Johor Bahru, Malaysia	(Indonesia) Taufik Hidayat	19–21, 14–21	Bronze

=== BWF International ===
Men's singles
Year	Tournament	Opponent	Score	Result
2005	Hungarian International	(Republic of Ireland) Scott Evans	15–3, 15–4	(gold) Winner
2012	Victoria International	(England) Andrew Smith	21–13, 21–11	(gold) Winner
2013	Czech International	(Italy) Indra Bagus Ade Chandra	21–11, 21–16	(gold) Winner

BWF International Challenge tournament
BWF International Series tournament
BWF Future Series tournament

== See also ==
- Indian Squad for 2008 Olympics
