= Hyderabad Hunters (badminton team) =

- Sport: Badminton
- Founded: 2013
- League: Premier Badminton League
- Based in: Hyderabad, India
- Home ground: Gachibowli Indoor Stadium
- Colors: Red
- Owner: Agile Entertainment
- Head coach: Rajendra Jakkampudi
- Captain: P V Sindhu
- PBL wins: 1 (2017-18)
- Website: www.hyderabadhunters.com

Hyderabad Hunters is a badminton team owned by Agile Entertainment Pvt. Ltd. for the Premier Badminton League (PBL). The team's home ground is Gachibowli Indoor Stadium, Hyderabad. The team is captained by the reigning world champion P. V. Sindhu.

== Current squad ==
Coach: (India) Rajendra Jakkampudi
Domestic	Overseas
(India) Ruthvika Gadde	(England) Ben Lane
(India) N. Sikki Reddy	(England) Sean Vendy
(India) Priyanshu Rajawat	(Malaysia) Liew Daren
(India) P. V. Sindhu	(Russia) Vladimir Ivanov
(India) Sourabh Verma	
