= P. V. Sindhu =

Indian badminton player (born 1995)

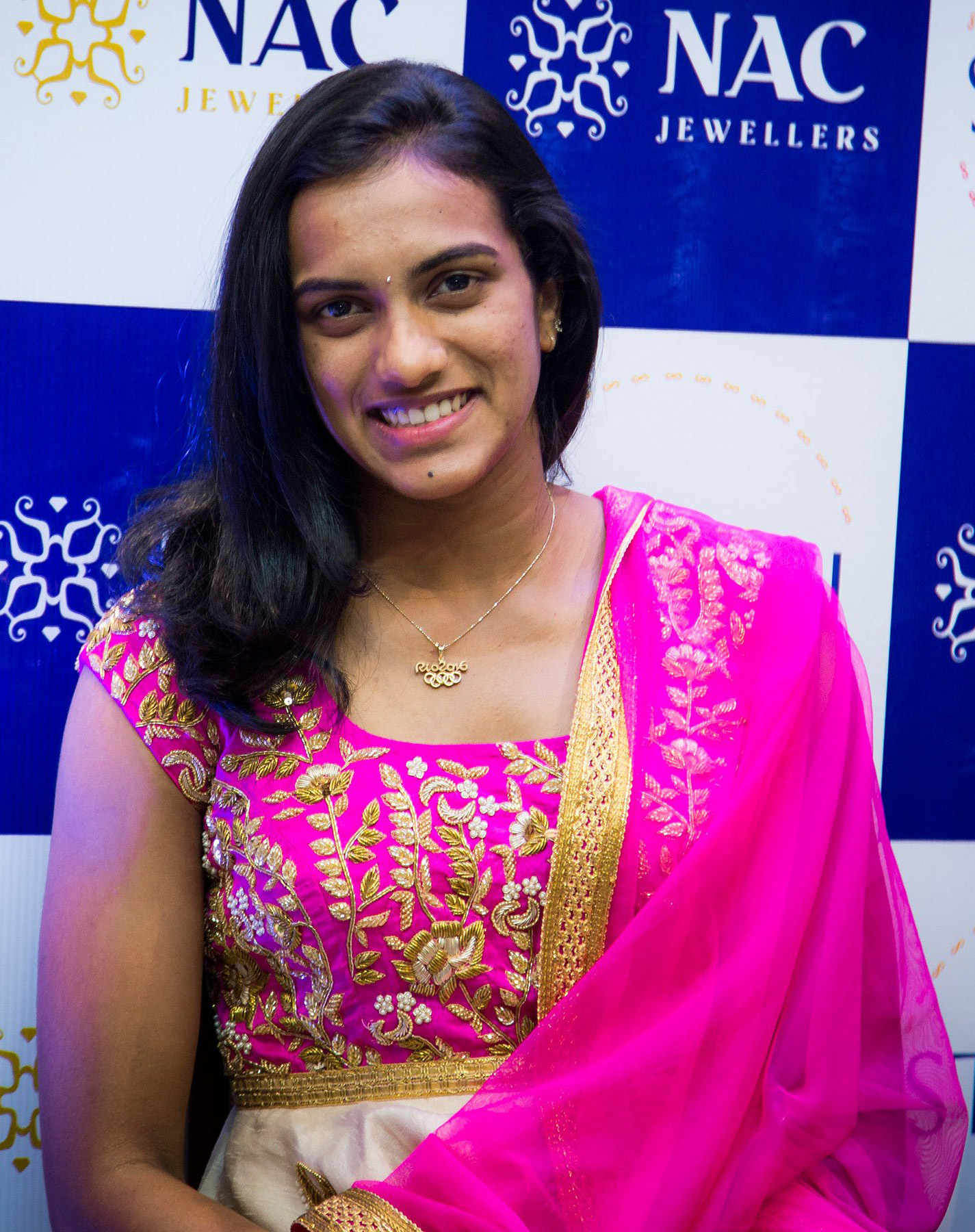
- Pusarla in 2016

Personal information
- Born: Pusarla Venkata Sindhu; 5 July 1995 (age 31) Hyderabad, Andhra Pradesh (now Telangana), India
- Years active: 2011–present
- Height: 1.79 m (5 ft 10 in)
- Weight: 65 kg (143 lb)

Sport
- Country: India
- Sport: Badminton
- Handedness: Right
- Coached by: Irwansyah Adi Pratama

Women's singles
- Career record: 539 wins, 250 losses
- Highest ranking: 2 (1 April 2017)
- Current ranking: 5 (17 November 2026)
- Honours: Khel Ratna Award; Arjuna Award; Padma Bhushan; Padma Shri
- BWF profile
Medal record
Women's badminton
Representing India
Olympic Games
Silver medal – second place	2016 Rio de Janeiro	Women's singles
Bronze medal – third place	2020 Tokyo	Women's singles
World Championships
Gold medal – first place	2019 Basel	Women's singles
Silver medal – second place	2017 Glasgow	Women's singles
Silver medal – second place	2018 Nanjing	Women's singles
Bronze medal – third place	2013 Guangzhou	Women's singles
Bronze medal – third place	2014 Copenhagen	Women's singles
Uber Cup
Bronze medal – third place	2014 New Delhi	Women's team
Bronze medal – third place	2016 Kunshan	Women's team
Commonwealth Games
Gold medal – first place	2022 Birmingham	Women's singles
Gold medal – first place	2018 Gold Coast	Mixed team
Silver medal – second place	2018 Gold Coast	Women's singles
Silver medal – second place	2022 Birmingham	Mixed team
Bronze medal – third place	2014 Glasgow	Women's singles
Asian Games
Silver medal – second place	2018 Jakarta	Women's singles
Bronze medal – third place	2014 Incheon	Women's team
Asian Championships
Bronze medal – third place	2014 Gimcheon	Women's singles
Bronze medal – third place	2022 Manila	Women's singles
Asia Mixed Team Championships
Bronze medal – third place	2023 Dubai	Mixed team
Asia Team Championships
Gold medal – first place	2024 Selangor	Women's team
South Asian Games
Gold medal – first place	2016 Guwahati and Shillong	Women's team
Silver medal – second place	2016 Guwahati and Shillong	Women's singles
Commonwealth Youth Games
Gold medal – first place	2011 Douglas	Girls' singles
Asian Junior Championships
Gold medal – first place	2012 Gimcheon	Girls' singles
Bronze medal – third place	2011 Lucknow	Girls' singles
Bronze medal – third place	2011 Lucknow	Mixed team

Pusarla Venkata Sindhu (born 5 July 1995) is an Indian badminton player. Considered as one of India's most successful athletes, Sindhu has won medals at tournaments such as the Olympic Games, the World Championships, and on the World Tour. She is the first and only Indian to become the badminton world champion and only the second individual from India to win two consecutive medals at the Olympic Games. She rose to a career-high world ranking of No. 2 in April 2017.

Sindhu broke into the top 20 of the BWF World Rankings in September 2012, at the age of 17. She has won a total of five medals at the BWF World Championships and is only the second woman after China's Zhang Ning ever to win five or more singles medals in the competition. She represented India at the 2016 Rio Olympics, where she became the first Indian badminton player to reach the Olympic final. She won the silver medal after losing out to Spain's Carolina Marín. She made her second consecutive Olympic appearance at the 2020 Tokyo Olympics and won a bronze medal, becoming the first-ever Indian woman to win two Olympic medals.

Sindhu won her first superseries title at the 2016 China Open and followed it up with four more finals in 2017, winning the titles in South Korea and India. She also won the 2018 BWF World Tour Finals and remains the only Indian player to win a season finale title. She is also the reigning Commonwealth Games champion and has won three consecutive singles medals at the Commonwealth Games, a silver medal at the Asian Games, and two bronze medals at the Uber Cup.

With earnings of US$8.5 million (2018), $5.5 million (2019), $7.2 million (2021), and $7.1 million (2022–24), Sindhu made the Forbes' list of Highest-Paid Female Athletes in 2018, 2019, 2021, 2022, 2023 and 2024. She is a recipient of the sports honours Khel Ratna Award and Arjuna Award, India's highest and second-highest sports awards, as well as the Padma Bhushan and Padma Shri, India's third-highest and fourth-highest civilian awards.

== Early life and training ==
Pusarla Venkata Sindhu was born on 5 July 1995, in a Telugu family, to P. V. Ramana and P. Vijaya, in Hyderabad, India. Both her parents hail from Andhra Pradesh. Her mother is from Vijayawada, while her father's family is originally from Eluru and later moved to Guntur and Nirmal. Sindhu lives in Hyderabad. She and her family regularly visit their family deity in Ratnalammakunta village of Eluru district, Andhra Pradesh. She was educated at Auxilium High School, Hyderabad, and at St. Ann's College for Women, Hyderabad.

Both her parents have been national-level volleyball players. Her father, Ramana, was a member of the Indian volleyball team that won the bronze medal at the 1986 Seoul Asian Games, received the Arjuna Award in 2000 for his contribution to the sport. Though both her parents played professional volleyball, she chose badminton instead because she drew inspiration from the success of Pullela Gopichand, the 2001 All England Open Badminton Champion. She eventually started playing badminton at the age of eight. She first learned the basics of the sport the guidance of Mehboob Ali at the badminton courts of the Indian Railway Institute of Signal Engineering and Telecommunications in Secunderabad. Soon after, she joined Pullela Gopichand's Gopichand Badminton Academy. While profiling her career, a correspondent with The Hindu wrote:

"The fact that she reports on time at the coaching camps daily, traveling a distance of 56 km from her residence, is perhaps a reflection of her willingness to complete her desire to be a good badminton player with the required hard work and commitment."

Gopichand seconded this correspondent's opinion when he said that "the most striking feature in Sindhu's game is her attitude and the never-say-die spirit." After joining Gopichand's badminton academy, Sindhu won several titles. In the under-10 years category, she won the fifth Servo All India ranking championship in the doubles category and the singles title at the Ambuja Cement All India ranking. In the under-13 years category, she won the singles title at the Sub-juniors in Pondicherry, doubles titles at the Krishna Khaitan All India Tournament IOC All India Ranking, the Sub-Junior Nationals and the All India Ranking in Pune. She also won the under-14 team gold medal at the 51st National State Games in India. She later parted company with Gopichand and went on to train with South Korean coach Park Tae-sang. She is currently coached by Anup Sridhar and Lee Hyun-il.

== Personal life ==
Sindhu got engaged to businessman Venkata Datta Sai in early December 2024 and married him on 22 December 2024 in Udaipur, Rajasthan.

Sindhu joined Bharat Petroleum in July 2013 and worked as an Assistant Manager (Sports) at its Hyderabad office. After winning a silver medal at the 2016 Summer Olympics, she was promoted to Deputy Sports Manager. Sindhu became the first brand ambassador of Bridgestone India in 2017. In July 2017, the Andhra Pradesh government appointed Sindhu as a Deputy Collector in Group-I service. She took charge of the position in August 2017.

== Career ==
=== 2009–11 ===
Sindhu entered the international circuit at a young age of 14 in the year 2009. She was a bronze medalist at the 2009 Sub-Junior Asian Badminton Championships held in Colombo. At the 2010 Iran Fajr International Badminton Challenge, she won the silver medal in the women's singles. She reached the quarter-finals of the 2010 BWF World Junior Championships that was held in Mexico, where she lost to Chinese Suo Di in a 3-gamer.

In 2011, she won the Maldives International Challenge in June defeating compatriot P. C. Thulasi, as well as the Indonesia International Challenge the following month. She then won the Commonwealth Youth Games by beating Soniia Cheah Su Ya of Malaysia in straight games. She was a finalist at the Dutch Open where she lost to home player Yao Jie 16–21, 17–21. Her successful run continued after she won the Swiss International beating Carola Bott of Germany in the final. She lost in the second round of the 2011 BWF World Junior Championships to Yuki Fukushima in a very close match 21–15, 18–21, 21–23. She won the India International badminton event later in the year, defeating compatriot Sayali Gokhale.

=== 2012 ===
A 16-year-old Sindhu went on to compete at the All England Open Championships as a qualifier. She reached the main draw but lost to Taiwan's Tai Tzu-ying in 3 games. On 7 July 2012, she won the Asian Junior Championships beating Japan's Nozomi Okuhara in the final 18–21, 21–17, 22–20, becoming India's first-ever Asian Junior Champion. In the China Masters Superseries tournament, she stunned London 2012 Olympics gold medalist Li Xuerui, beating her 21–19, 9–21, 21–16 and entered the semi-finals. However, she lost in the semi-finals to fourth seeded Jiang Yanjiao of China 10–21, 21–14, 19–21.

Sindhu then went on to participate in the 77th Senior National Badminton Championships held at Srinagar. She was defeated in the finals by Sayali Gokhale 15–21, 21–15, 15–21. It was later revealed that she had injured her knee in the China Open and had carried this injury through the Japan Open and the nationals. She decided to skip the World Junior Championships so as to not aggravate the injury. She finished runner-up in the Syed Modi India Grand Prix Gold event held in Lucknow in December, after going down to Indonesia's Lindaweni Fanetri in 3 games in the final.

=== 2013 ===
Sindhu stunned China's Wang Shixian in the second round of the Asian Championships in 3 tough games to reach the quarter-final, but lost to Eriko Hirose of Japan in yet another 3-game clash. She reached her career-best ranking of 15. She won the Malaysian Grand Prix Gold title, beating Singaporean Gu Juan - 21–17, 17–21, 21–19. This was her first Grand Prix Gold title. She participated in the 2013 World Championships, where she was seeded tenth in the draw. Having received a bye in the first round, she defeated Japanese Kaori Imabeppu in the second round in three games 21–19, 19–21, 21–17 and reached the third round. She then downed the defending champion, second-seeded Wang Yihan of China, 21–18, 23–21 to enter the quarter-finals. She set up a meeting with another higher-seeded Chinese player, Wang Shixian, and beat her 21–18, 21–17 to become only India's second medalist in the singles events at the World Championships since Prakash Padukone's bronze medal in 1983. However, she lost in the semi-final to eventual champion Ratchanok Intanon.

Sindhu was awarded the Arjuna Award by the Government of India in recognition of her achievements. In the 2013 Indian Badminton League, she was the captain of the team Awadhe Warriors. Her team qualified for the semi-final, where they beat Mumbai Marathas, but lost in the final to Hyderabad Hotshots. She won the Macau Open Grand Prix Gold title by defeating Canada's Michelle Li 21–15, 21–12 in the final.

=== 2014 ===
Sindhu reached the final of the 2014 India Open Grand Prix Gold but lost to her senior compatriot Saina Nehwal. She claimed her first medal at the Asian Championships, a bronze, after beating Thailand's Busanan Ongbamrungphan in the quarter-finals. She reached the semi-final stage of the 2014 Commonwealth Games in the women's singles competition, which she lost narrowly to eventual gold medalist Michelle Li of Canada. She later won against Malaysian Tee Jing Yi to claim the bronze medal.

In the 2014 World Championships held in Denmark, Sindhu was seeded eleventh. She powered past Russian Olga Arkhangelskaya in her first round in two easy games. She had a tough encounter against sixth seed Bae Yeon-ju in the round of 16 where she edged a close win 19–21, 22–20, 25–23. She later created history by becoming the first Indian to win two back-to-back medals in the BWF World Championships, after her bronze medal win the previous year, by beating second seed Wang Shixian in the quarter-finals in three games 19–21, 21–19, 21–15, in a match lasting more than an hour. However, in the semi-finals, she lost to the eventual champion Carolina Marín in straight games and had to settle for another bronze medal. At the end of the year, she defended her Macau Open title by beating Kim Hyo-min of South Korea in the final.

=== 2015 ===
Sindhu was on the verge of victory against Li Xuerui in the quarter-finals of the Asian Championships, but ended up losing 21–11, 19–21, 8–21, narrowly missing out on a second consecutive Asian Championships medal. At the 2015 World Championships, where she was seeded eleventh, Sindhu defeated Line Kjærsfeldt of Denmark in the first round after being a game down. She then stunned third seeded Li Xuerui in the round of 16 and reached the quarter-finals of the World Championships once again. However, this time, she suffered defeat against her Korean opponent Sung Ji-hyun in a close quarter-finals match 21–17, 19–21, 16–21, narrowly missing out on a third consecutive World Championship medal.

In October, playing at the Denmark Open, Sindhu reached her maiden Superseries tournament final, defeating three seeded players – Tai Tzu-ying, Wang Yihan and Carolina Marín. In the final, she lost to the defending champion Li Xuerui in straight games 19–21, 12–21. In November, the defending champion Sindhu won her third successive women's singles title at the Macau Open Grand Prix Gold after defeating Japan's Minatsu Mitani in the final 21–9, 21–23, 21–14.

She suffered a stress fracture in 2015 that kept her from playing for nearly six months, yet managed to qualify for the 2016 Rio Olympics.

=== 2016 ===
In January, Sindhu won the Malaysia Masters Grand Prix Gold women's singles title after beating Scotland's Kirsty Gilmour in the final. She had also won this tournament in 2013. She lost a close match at the Asian Championships to Tai Tzu-ying in the second round, in which she failed to capitalise on a match point and suffered defeat. In the 2016 Premier Badminton League, she was the captain of the Chennai Smashers team. In the group stage of the league, she won all of her five matches to help her team qualify for the semi-final and win the tournament against Mumbai Rockets.

Sindhu was seeded ninth at the Rio Olympic Games. In the group stage, she defeated Hungary's Laura Sárosi (2–0) and Canada's Michelle Li (2–1). She then ousted Taiwanese eighth seed Tai Tzu-ying (2–0) in the round of 16 to meet the second seeded Wang Yihan from China in the quarter-finals, whom she also defeated in straight games. She later faced sixth seeded Japanese star Nozomi Okuhara in the semi-finals and won in straight games, ensuring a podium finish. This set the stage for her final showdown with the top seed from Spain, Carolina Marín. Marin managed to beat her in three games in the 83-minute match. With that result, she clinched the silver medal, creating history as India's youngest individual Olympic medallist and the first Indian woman to bag an Olympic silver medal. This was only the second instance of a podium finish at the Olympics by any Indian badminton player.

Following her Olympic success, Sindhu clinched the title at the China Open beating China's Sun Yu 21–11, 17–21, 21–11. With this win, she became the second Indian player after Saina Nehwal and just the third non-Chinese women's singles player to win the China Open. She was also the runner-up at the Hong Kong Open after going down to Tai Tzu-ying in the final in straight games. With her consistent performances, she qualified for the Superseries Finals. She defeated Akane Yamaguchi (2–1), lost to Sun Yu (0–2) and beat Carolina Marín (2–0) in the group stage. With 2 wins in the group, she reached the semi-finals, managing to do so in just her first-ever appearance in the tournament. However, she was defeated in the semi-finals by Sung Ji-hyun, going down 15–21, 21–18, 15–21. Sindhu was named as the BWF Most Improved Player of the Year following her achievements in 2016.

=== 2017 ===
Sindhu won the Syed Modi International by beating Indonesian youngster Gregoria Mariska Tunjung in the final. In the India Open Superseries, she won the title by defeating Carolina Marín in straight games. In April 2017, she achieved a career-high world ranking of number 2. At the 2017 World Championships held in Scotland, she was seeded fourth. In the round of 32, she defeated Korean Kim Hyo-min in straight games. She survived a difficult challenge from Hongkonger Cheung Ngan Yi in the next round, beating her in 3 close games 19–21, 23–21, 21–17. She thereafter eased past Sun Yu in the quarter-finals and another Chinese Chen Yufei in the semi-finals, both in straight games. She had to settle for silver after losing to Nozomi Okuhara in the final 19–21, 22–20, 20–22, a close and exciting match lasting 110 minutes, thus making it the second longest women's singles match in the history of badminton. Her final against Okuhara is widely regarded as one of the best ever women's singles matches in the history of the sport.

Sindhu defeated Okuhara in the final of the 2017 Korea Open Super Series 22–20, 11–21, 21–18, thereby becoming the first Indian to win the Korea Open. In August, she took charge as the Deputy Collector in Krishna District in the Chief Commissioner of Land Administration (CCLA) office under the Revenue Department of the Government of Andhra Pradesh. She set up a repeat clash of the previous year's final at the Hongkong Open, which she again lost to Tai Tzu-ying in straight games. Owing to her consistent performances, she qualified yet again for the Superseries Finals, and was also nominated for the BWF Female Player of the Year Award, which was eventually won by Chen Qingchen of China. In the group stage of the Dubai World Superseries Finals, she won all of her matches against He Bingjiao (2–1), Sayaka Sato (2–0) and Akane Yamaguchi (2–0) to progress to the semi-final. In the semi-final, she defeated China's Chen Yufei (2–0) to reach the final. She finished as the runner-up after being narrowly beaten by Japan's Akane Yamaguchi 21–15, 12–21, 19–21 in an exciting 94-minute final.

=== 2018 ===
Sindhu faltered in the final again, this time at her home event, the India Open, where she had a match point in the third game but was unable to convert it and lost the match narrowly to Beiwen Zhang. At the All England Open Championships, she made it to the last four, before losing to world number 3 Akane Yamaguchi in the semi-final with a close 21–19, 19–21, 18–21 scoreline. This was her best performance at the All England Open. She competed at the 2018 Commonwealth Games in Gold Coast, winning a gold medal in the mixed team event and a silver medal in the singles event. Her jinx of losing in finals continued after she went down to Nozomi Okuhara in the final of the Thailand Open.

Sindhu was seeded third in the 2018 BWF World Championships. She won her opening encounters against Fitriani and ninth seed Sung Ji-hyun, both in straight games. She then faced defending champion Nozomi Okuhara, whom she also defeated with a 21–17, 21–19 scoreline. In the semi-finals, she beat second-seeded Akane Yamaguchi in 2 games 21–16, 24–22. She won her second consecutive World Championship silver medal after losing to Carolina Marín in the final 19–21, 10–21. This was her fourth medal at the World Championships in total.

Sindhu was seeded third in the 2018 Asian Games. In the first round, she defeated Vietnamese Vũ Thị Trang in 3 games 21–10, 12–21, 23–21 in a very close encounter. She then faced Gregoria Mariska Tunjung and beat her with a 21–12, 21–15 scoreline. She then had to battle to get past Thai Nitchaon Jindapol in the quarter-finals in three games. In the semi-finals, she defeated second seed Akane Yamaguchi to enter the final round. Though she lost to top seed Tai Tzu-ying in the final, she won a historic first silver medal for India in badminton.

Sindhu qualified for the 2018 BWF World Tour Finals at the end of the year. In the group stage, she defeated defending champion Akane Yamaguchi (2–0), top seed Tai Tzu-ying (2–1) and USA's Beiwen Zhang (2–0) to progress to the semi-finals. In the semi-finals, she defeated Thailand's Ratchanok Intanon (2–0) to reach her second consecutive final at the tournament. In the final, she defeated her arch-rival Nozomi Okuhara 21–19, 21–17, becoming the only shuttler from India to claim the title at the year-end finale.

=== 2019–20 ===
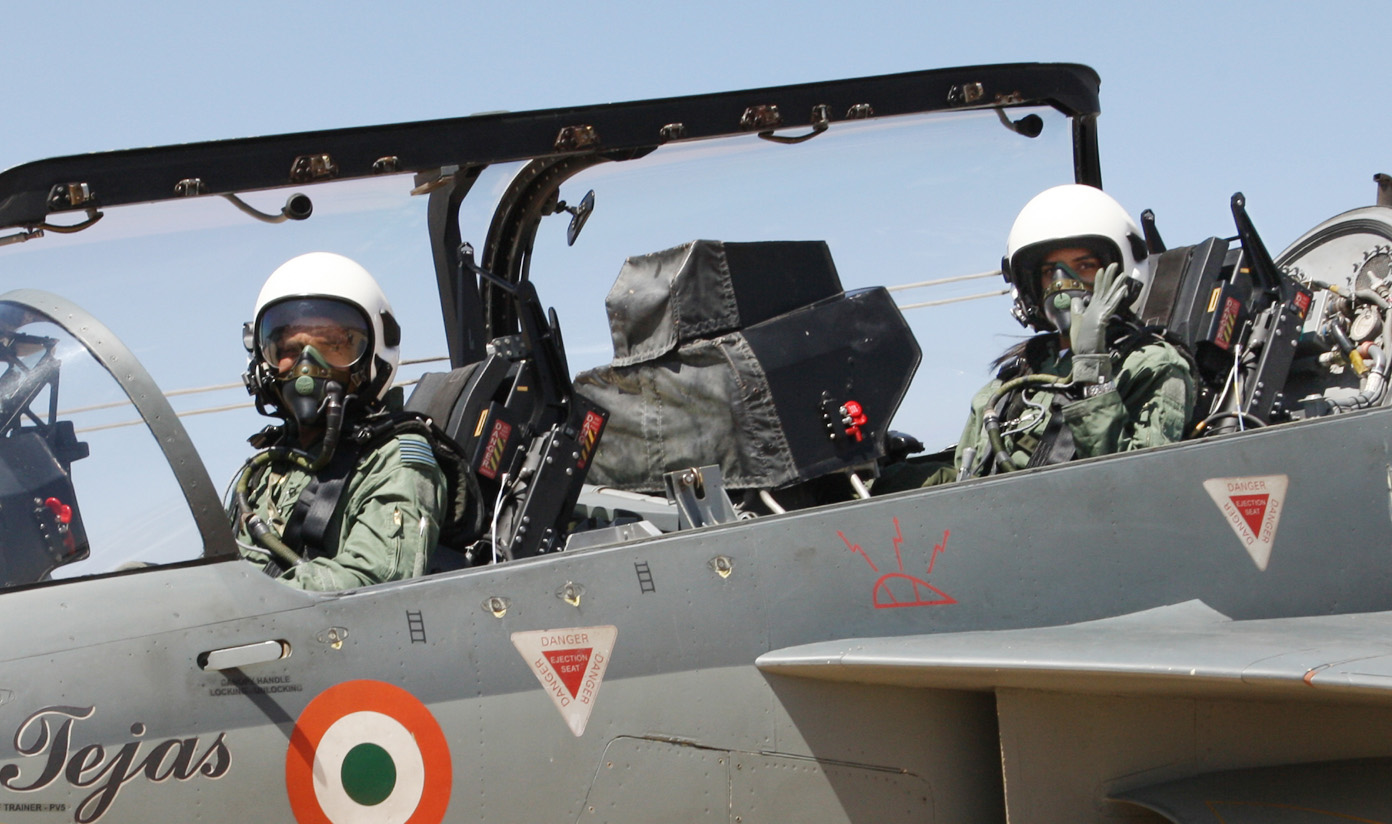
Sindhu inside the cockpit of HAL Tejas at Yelahanka AFS, Bangalore

Sindhu was bought by the defending champions Hyderabad Hunters in the 2018 PBL auctions and was named as their skipper. They lost in the semi-finals to Mumbai Rockets. Sindhu competed at the Indian National Championships where she reached the final, losing to three-time champion Saina Nehwal 18–21, 15–21. Just before the All England Championships, she had ended her deal with Yonex and signed a mega-deal with Li-Ning for 4 years worth nearly ₹500 million (US$5.3 million). This led to her having a new racket and equipment to which she had to get used to within 2–3 weeks, to debut it at the prestigious All England Badminton Championships. She reached her first final of the season in the Indonesia Open, where she lost to Akane Yamaguchi of Japan 15–21, 16–21.

At the 2019 World Championships, Sindhu was seeded fifth. She opened her campaign with comfortable straight-game victories over Pai Yu-po and ninth seed Beiwen Zhang in successive rounds. She impressed everyone with her victory over second seed Tai Tzu-ying in the quarter-finals. She defeated Tai, coming from a game down 12–21, 23–21, 21–19 to make the semi-final and secure a fifth World Championship medal, the joint-most in the history of women's singles badminton. In the semi-final, she defeated third seed Chen Yufei in straight games in dominating fashion, 21–7, 21–14, to enter her third consecutive World Championships final. In the final against Nozomi Okuhara, she put up a near-flawless display to win 21–7, 21–7. In the process, she became the first Indian to win gold at the World Championships.

Despite her ranking as 15th on the World Tour, Sindhu got a wild card entry into the 2019 BWF World Tour Finals because of her World Championship victory in August. She competed in the World Tour Finals in Guangzhou as the defending champion but failed to reach the knockout phase after losing to Chen Yufei (1–2) and Akane Yamaguchi (1–2) in successive rounds. She finished off as third in the group after defeating He Bingjiao 21–19, 21–19 in her last match. She was named the BBC Indian Sportswoman of Year on 8 March 2020. In April, she was elected as one of the ambassadors of the BWF Committee's campaign – "I am Badminton" to promote clean and fair play in the sport.

=== 2021 ===
Sindhu, reaching her first final in over 18 months at the 2021 Swiss Open, suffered a demoralising defeat against Carolina Marín, losing 12–21, 5–21. She was then stunned by Pornpawee Chochuwong of Thailand in the semi-final of the All England Open, losing out 17–21, 9–21. In May, she was elected as one of the two ambassadors from badminton in the International Olympic Committee's campaign ‘Believe in Sport’, aimed at preventing competition manipulation in the sport.

Sindhu was seeded sixth at the Tokyo Olympic Games. She won both of her group matches against Israel's Ksenia Polikarpova and Hong Kong's Cheung Ngan Yi to progress towards the knockout stage. She defeated Denmark's Mia Blichfeldt comfortably in the round of 16 and reached the quarter-finals. She put up a dominating display to outmanoeuvre fourth seed Akane Yamaguchi of Japan 21–13, 22–20, placing herself in the last four stage, also becoming the only Indian shuttler to reach two consecutive Olympic semi-finals. Her opponent for the semi-final was second seed Tai Tzu-ying. Sindhu, who was yet to drop a game in the tournament, fell against Taiwan's Tai in two straight games 18–21, 12–21. She later beat eighth seed He Bingjiao of China in the playoff to clinch the bronze medal, thereby becoming the first Indian woman and only the fourth player in women's singles badminton to claim two medals at two consecutive Olympic games.

At the 2021 BWF World Championships, where she competed as the defending champion, Sindhu was seeded sixth. She eased past Slovakia's Martina Repiská in her opening encounter in straight games. She then defeated ninth seed Pornpawee Chochuwong 21–14, 21–18 in another straight-game encounter to make the quarter-finals. However, in the quarter-finals, she went down to top seed Tai Tzu-ying 17–21, 13–21, failing to medal at the World Championships for only the second time in her career.

Sindhu qualified for the 2021 BWF World Tour Finals at the end of the year. In the group stage, she beat Line Christophersen (2–0), Yvonne Li (2–0) and lost to Pornpawee Chochuwong (1–2), qualifying for the semi-finals as second in her group. In the semi-final, she beat Akane Yamaguchi 21–15, 15–21, 21–19 in an exciting clash to make a third final at the year-end championships, only the second women's singles player to do so. In the final, she lost to South Korea's An Se-young to bag a second silver medal at the tournament.

=== 2022–23 ===
Sindhu won the Syed Modi International for the second time beating compatriot Malvika Bansod in the final. She then won the title at the 2022 Swiss Open, defeating Thailand's Busanan Ongbamrungphan in the final in two straight games. At the Asian Championships, where she was seeded fourth, Sindhu defeated fifth seed He Bingjiao of China in the quarter-finals, but lost a close and controversial semi-final to top seed Akane Yamaguchi, thus winning the bronze medal, her second medal at the tournament. She then won the Singapore Open title, beating Asian Champion Wang Zhiyi of China in the final.

At the 2022 Commonwealth Games, Sindhu won her maiden Commonwealth Games gold medal in the women's singles, beating Michelle Li of Canada in the final. With this win, she became only the second women's singles player to win a full set of medals at the Commonwealth Games. She was also unbeaten in the mixed team event, where India won a silver medal. However, during the Games, she sustained a left foot stress fracture injury that kept her out of all remaining tournaments of the year, including the World Championships and the World Tour Finals.

Sindhu made a return from her injury layoff in the first tournament of 2023, the Malaysia Open. In February, she was part of the Indian team that won a bronze medal at the Badminton Asia Mixed Team Championships, India's first-ever medal at the tournament. She reached her first final of the season at the 2023 Spain Masters, where she lost to Gregoria Mariska Tunjung in straight games. She endured an up-and-down season, with four semi-finals but also seven first-round exits. Her season was once again cut short, this time at the French Open in October, where she pulled out of her second round match with a knee injury.

=== 2024–25 ===
Sindhu returned from her injury layoff at the Badminton Asia Team Championships in February, where she led the Indian women's team to the gold medal, India's first-ever medal in the event. Her first individual final of the season came at the 2024 Malaysia Masters, where she lost to reigning Asian Champion Wang Zhiyi in three games. On 8 July 2024, the Indian Olympic Committee designated her and the professional table tennis player Sharath Kamal as the flag bearers to the París 2024 Olympic Games. In the 2024 Olympics in Paris, Sindhu won both her games in group M but lost in the round of 16 to He Bingjiao of China, the same player she had beaten in the 2020 Games bronze medal match. At the end of the year, Sindhu won the 2024 Syed Modi International title beating Wu Luoyu of China in the final. This was her third title at the Syed Modi International, making her the joint-most successful player in the history of the tournament.

In 2025, Sindhu was elected in the BWF Athletes' Commission for the third time. She endured an up-and-down season, with some of her standout results being a win over second seed Wang Zhiyi at the World Championships, and a win over World No. 6 Pornpawee Chochuwong at the China Masters. However, she ended her season after the China Masters owing to a foot injury.

== Endorsements ==
An Economic Times report published in March 2017 noted that she is second only to Indian cricket captain Virat Kohli when it comes to earnings from each day of brand endorsements. Sindhu charges brands anywhere between ₹10 million (US$110,000) and ₹12.5 million (US$130,000) for a single day of endorsement-related activities.

She has endorsement deals with JBL, Bridgestone Tyres, sports drink Gatorade, pain reliever ointment Moov, online fashion store Myntra, e-commerce portal Flipkart, phone maker Nokia and electronics major Panasonic. She also endorses Stayfree, health drink Boost, honey producer APIS Himalaya, herbal health drink firm Ojasvita and the Bank of Baroda. She is also a brand ambassador for both the Central Reserve Police Force and Vizag Steel.

In February 2019, it was announced that Sindhu had signed a four-year sports sponsorship deal for ₹500 million (US$5.3 million) with Chinese sports brand Li-Ning. Her deal is one of the biggest in world badminton. She would reportedly get ₹400 million (US$4.3 million) as sponsorship while the rest of the money would be for equipment. This was Li-Ning's second stint with Sindhu, who was with them for two years in 2014–2015 for a sum of ₹12.5 million (equivalent to ₹22 million or US$230,000 in 2026) a year. In 2016, she was back with Yonex for a ₹35 million (equivalent to ₹55 million or US$590,000 in 2026) per year contract for a period of three years.

In May 2024, she stepped in as an investor and brand ambassador for wellness brand Hoop.

== Awards and recognition ==
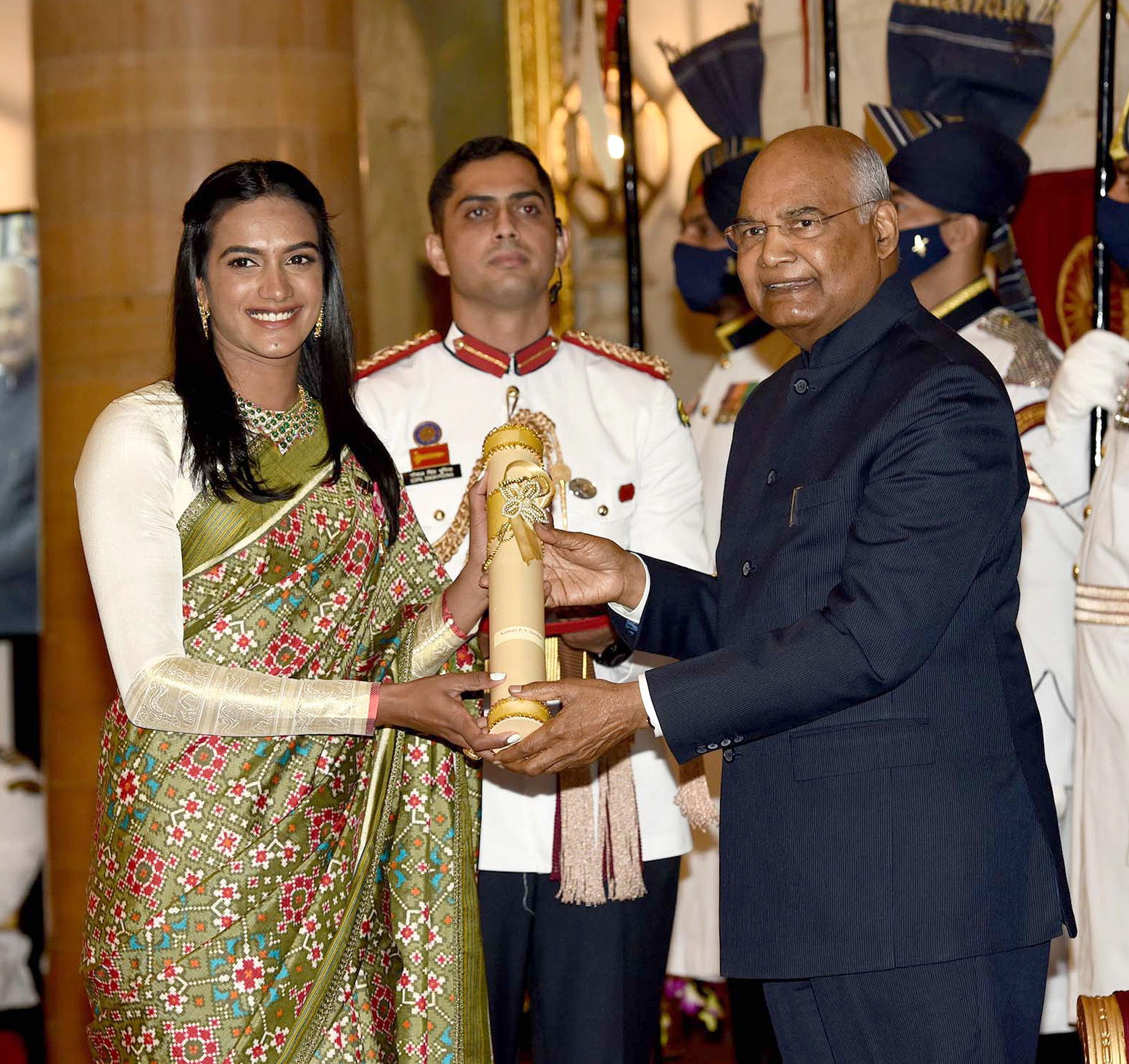
Sindhu being awarded Padma Bhushan, c. 2021

=== National ===
- Arjuna Award (2013)
- Padma Shri, the fourth-highest civilian award of India (2015)
- Major Dhyan Chand Khel Ratna, the highest sporting honour of India (2016)
- Padma Bhushan, the third-highest civilian award of India (2020)

=== Others ===
- CNN-IBN Indian of the Year (Sports) 2013
- FICCI Breakthrough Sportsperson of the Year 2014
- NDTV Indian of the Year (Sports) 2014
- BWF Most Improved Player of the Year 2016
- Indian Sports Honours Sportswoman of the Year 2017
- Forbes 30 Under 30: Entertainment & Sports 2018
- TV9 Nava Nakshatra Sanmanam 2019
- Times of India Sports Awards (TOISA) Sportsperson of the Year 2019
- BBC Indian Sportswoman of the Year 2020
- Champions of Change (Telangana) 2021
- NDTV True Legend: Future of Young India (Sports) 2022
- Forbes India W-Power 2025

Rewards for winning the silver medal at the 2016 Rio Summer Olympics

- ₹50 million (equivalent to ₹78 million or US$840,000 in 2026), and a land grant from the Government of Telangana.
- ₹30 million (equivalent to ₹47 million or US$500,000 in 2026), a Group A cadre job (Deputy Collector of Andhra Pradesh) and 1000 yd^{2} land grant from the Government of Andhra Pradesh.
- ₹20 million (equivalent to ₹31 million or US$340,000 in 2026) from the Government of Delhi.
- ₹7.5 million (equivalent to ₹12 million or US$130,000 in 2026) from her employer, Bharat Petroleum Corporation, with promotion from assistant to deputy sports manager.
- ₹5 million (equivalent to ₹7.8 million or US$84,000 in 2026) from the Government of Haryana.
- ₹5 million (equivalent to ₹7.8 million or US$84,000 in 2026) from the Government of Madhya Pradesh.
- ₹5 million (equivalent to ₹7.8 million or US$84,000 in 2026) from the Ministry of Youth Affairs and Sports.
- ₹5 million (equivalent to ₹7.8 million or US$84,000 in 2026) from Badminton Association of India.
- ₹5 million (equivalent to ₹7.8 million or US$84,000 in 2026) from NRI businessman, Mukkattu Sebastian.
- ₹3 million (equivalent to ₹4.7 million or US$50,000 in 2026) from the Indian Olympic Association.
- ₹500,000 (equivalent to ₹780,000 or US$8,400 in 2026) from All India Football Federation.
- ₹100,000 (equivalent to ₹160,000 or US$1,700 in 2026) from actor Salman Khan, for qualifying as an Olympic participant.
- BMW car from the Hyderabad District Badminton Association and Indian cricketer Sachin Tendulkar.
- Mahindra Thar from Mahindra Group chairman Anand Mahindra.
- Two-acre land from actor Vijayachander.
- Diamond necklace worth ₹600,000 (equivalent to ₹940,000 or US$10,000 in 2026) from NAC Jewellers.
- Miniature gold and diamond badminton racquet memento from Kirtilals.

Rewards for winning the gold medal at the 2019 BWF World Championships

- ₹2 million (US$21,000) from the Badminton Association of India.
- ₹1 million (US$11,000) from the Government of India.
- ₹1 million (US$11,000) from the Government of Kerala.
- Land grant from the Government of Andhra Pradesh.
- BMW car from actor Nagarjuna Akkineni and businessman V. Chamundeswaranath.

Rewards for winning the bronze medal at the 2020 Tokyo Summer Olympics

- ₹10 million (US$110,000) from the Government of Uttar Pradesh.
- ₹10 million (US$110,000) from BYJU'S.
- ₹5 million (US$53,000) from the Government of Telangana.
- ₹3 million (US$32,000) from the Government of India.
- ₹3 million (US$32,000) from the Government of Andhra Pradesh.
- ₹2.5 million (US$27,000) from the Board of Control for Cricket in India
- ₹2.5 million (US$27,000) from the Indian Olympic Association.
- ₹1.5 million (US$16,000) from the JSW Group.

== Achievements ==
=== Olympic Games ===
Women's singles
Year	Venue	Opponent	Score	Result	Ref.
2016	Riocentro – Pavilion 4, Rio de Janeiro, Brazil	(Spain) Carolina Marín	21–19, 12–21, 15–21	Silver	
2020	Musashino Forest Sport Plaza, Tokyo, Japan	(China) He Bingjiao	21–13, 21–15	Bronze	

=== World Championships ===
Women's singles
Year	Venue	Opponent	Score	Result	Ref.
2013	Tianhe Stadium, Guangzhou, China	(Thailand) Ratchanok Intanon	10–21, 13–21	Bronze	
2014	Ballerup Super Arena, Copenhagen, Denmark	(Spain) Carolina Marín	17–21, 15–21	Bronze	
2017	Emirates Arena, Glasgow, Scotland	(Japan) Nozomi Okuhara	19–21, 22–20, 20–22	Silver	
2018	Nanjing Youth Olympic Sports Park, Nanjing, China	(Spain) Carolina Marín	19–21, 10–21	Silver	
2019	St. Jakobshalle, Basel, Switzerland	(Japan) Nozomi Okuhara	21–7, 21–7	Gold	

=== Commonwealth Games ===
Women's singles
Year	Venue	Opponent	Score	Result	Ref.
2014	Emirates Arena, Glasgow, Scotland	(Malaysia) Tee Jing Yi	23–21, 21–9	Bronze	
2018	Carrara Sports and Leisure Centre, Gold Coast, Australia	(India) Saina Nehwal	18–21, 21–23	Silver	
2022	National Exhibition Centre, Birmingham, England	(Canada) Michelle Li	21–15, 21–13	Gold	

=== Asian Games ===
Women's singles
Year	Venue	Opponent	Score	Result	Ref.
2018	Istora Gelora Bung Karno, Jakarta, Indonesia	(Chinese Taipei) Tai Tzu-ying	13–21, 16–21	Silver	

=== Asian Championships ===
Women's singles
Year	Venue	Opponent	Score	Result	Ref.
2014	Gimcheon Indoor Stadium, Gimcheon, South Korea	(China) Wang Shixian	21–15, 20–22, 12–21	Bronze	
2022	Muntinlupa Sports Complex, Metro Manila, Philippines	(Japan) Akane Yamaguchi	21–13, 19–21, 16–21	Bronze	

=== South Asian Games ===
Women's singles
Year	Venue	Opponent	Score	Result	Ref.
2016	SAI–SAG Centre, Shillong, India	(India) Ruthvika Gadde	11–21, 20–22	Silver	

=== Commonwealth Youth Games ===
Girls' singles
Year	Venue	Opponent	Score	Result	Ref.
2011	National Sports Centre, Douglas, Isle of Man	(Malaysia) Soniia Cheah Su Ya	22–20, 21–8	Gold	

=== Asian Junior Championships ===
Girls' Singles
Year	Venue	Opponent	Score	Result	Ref.
2011	Babu Banarasi Das Indoor Stadium, Lucknow, India	(China) Sun Yu	21–13, 12–21, 10–21	Bronze	
2012	Gimcheon Indoor Stadium, Gimcheon, South Korea	(Japan) Nozomi Okuhara	18–21, 21–17, 22–20	Gold	

=== BWF World Tour (7 titles, 8 runners-up) ===
The BWF World Tour, which was announced on 19 March 2017 and implemented in 2018, is a series of elite badminton tournaments sanctioned by the Badminton World Federation (BWF). The BWF World Tour is divided into levels of World Tour Finals, Super 1000, Super 750, Super 500, Super 300, and the BWF Tour Super 100.

Women's singles
Year	Tournament	Level	Opponent	Score	Result	Ref.
2018	India Open	Super 500	(United States) Beiwen Zhang	18–21, 21–11, 20–22	(silver) Runner-up	
2018	Thailand Open	Super 500	(Japan) Nozomi Okuhara	15–21, 18–21	(silver) Runner-up	
2018	BWF World Tour Finals	World Tour Finals	(Japan) Nozomi Okuhara	21–19, 21–17	(gold) Winner	
2019	Indonesia Open	Super 1000	(Japan) Akane Yamaguchi	15–21, 16–21	(silver) Runner-up	
2021	Swiss Open	Super 300	(Spain) Carolina Marín	12–21, 5–21	(silver) Runner-up	
2021	BWF World Tour Finals	World Tour Finals	(South Korea) An Se-young	16–21, 12–21	(silver) Runner-up	
2022	Syed Modi International	Super 300	(India) Malvika Bansod	21–13, 21–16	(gold) Winner	
2022	Swiss Open	Super 300	(Thailand) Busanan Ongbamrungphan	21–16, 21–8	(gold) Winner	
2022	Singapore Open	Super 500	(China) Wang Zhiyi	21–9, 11–21, 21–15	(gold) Winner	
2023	Spain Masters	Super 300	(Indonesia) Gregoria Mariska Tunjung	8–21, 8–21	(silver) Runner-up	
2024	Malaysia Masters	Super 500	(China) Wang Zhiyi	21–16, 5–21, 16–21	(silver) Runner-up	
2024	Syed Modi International	Super 300	(China) Wu Luoyu	21–14, 21–16	(gold) Winner	
2026	Japan Open	Super 750	(Japan) Akane Yamaguchi	21–17, 21–17	(gold) Winner	
2026	French Open	Super 750	(South Korea) An Se-young	21–16, 11–21, 12–21	(silver) Runner-up	
2026	Hylo Open	Super 500	(Denmark) Line Kjærsfeldt	21–12, 21–14	(gold) Winner	

=== BWF Superseries (3 titles, 4 runners-up) ===
The BWF Superseries, which was launched on 14 December 2006 and implemented in 2007, was a series of elite badminton tournaments, sanctioned by the Badminton World Federation (BWF). BWF Superseries levels were Superseries and Superseries Premier. A season of Superseries consisted of twelve tournaments around the world that had been introduced since 2011. Successful players were invited to the Superseries Finals, which were held at the end of each year.

Women's singles
Year	Tournament	Opponent	Score	Result	Ref.
2015	Denmark Open	(China) Li Xuerui	19–21, 12–21	(silver) Runner-up	
2016	China Open	(China) Sun Yu	21–11, 17–21, 21–11	(gold) Winner	
2016	Hong Kong Open	(Chinese Taipei) Tai Tzu-ying	15–21, 17–21	(silver) Runner-up	
2017	India Open	(Spain) Carolina Marín	21–19, 21–16	(gold) Winner	
2017	Korea Open	(Japan) Nozomi Okuhara	22–20, 11–21, 21–18	(gold) Winner	
2017	Hong Kong Open	(Chinese Taipei) Tai Tzu-ying	18–21, 18–21	(silver) Runner-up	
2017	Dubai World Superseries Finals	(Japan) Akane Yamaguchi	21–15, 12–21, 19–21	(silver) Runner-up	

BWF Super Series Finals tournament
BWF Super Series Premier tournament
BWF Super Series tournament

=== BWF Grand Prix (6 titles, 3 runners-up) ===
The BWF Grand Prix had two levels, the Grand Prix and Grand Prix Gold. It was a series of badminton tournaments sanctioned by the Badminton World Federation (BWF) and played between 2007 and 2017.

Women's singles
Year	Tournament	Opponent	Score	Result	Ref.
2011	Dutch Open	(Netherlands) Yao Jie	16–21, 17–21	(silver) Runner-up	
2012	India Grand Prix Gold	(Indonesia) Lindaweni Fanetri	15–21, 21–18, 18–21	(silver) Runner-up	
2013	Malaysia Grand Prix Gold	(Singapore) Gu Juan	21–17, 17–21, 21–19	(gold) Winner	
2013	Macau Open	(Canada) Michelle Li	21–15, 21–12	(gold) Winner	
2014	India Grand Prix Gold	(India) Saina Nehwal	14–21, 17–21	(silver) Runner-up	
2014	Macau Open	(South Korea) Kim Hyo-min	21–12, 21–17	(gold) Winner	
2015	Macau Open	(Japan) Minatsu Mitani	21–9, 21–23, 21–14	(gold) Winner	
2016	Malaysia Masters	(Scotland) Kirsty Gilmour	21–15, 21–9	(gold) Winner	
2017	Syed Modi International	(Indonesia) Gregoria Mariska Tunjung	21–13, 21–14	(gold) Winner	

BWF Grand Prix Gold tournament
BWF Grand Prix tournament

=== BWF International Challenge/Series (4 titles, 1 runner-up) ===
Women's singles
Year	Tournament	Opponent	Score	Result	Ref.
2010	Iran Fajr International	(Japan) Rie Eto	14–21, 24–26	(silver) Runner-up	
2011	Maldives International	(India) P. C. Thulasi	21–11, 21–16	(gold) Winner	
2011	Indonesia International	(Indonesia) Fransisca Ratnasari	21–16, 21–11	(gold) Winner	
2011	Swiss International	(Germany) Carola Bott	21–11, 21–11	(gold) Winner	
2011	Tata Open India International	(India) Sayali Gokhale	21–10, 20–22, 21–11	(gold) Winner	

BWF International Challenge tournament
BWF International Series tournament

=== Invitational tournament ===
Women's singles
Year	Tournament	Opponent	Score	Result	Ref.
2015	Copenhagen Masters	(Denmark) Line Kjærsfeldt	12–21, 19–21	(silver) Runner-up	

== Career overview ==
Singles	Played	Wins	Losses	Balance
Total	712	484	228	+256
Current year (2026)	28	19	9	+10

Doubles	Played	Wins	Losses	Balance
Total	27	16	11	+5
Current year (2026)	2	2	0	+2

Mixed	Played	Wins	Losses	Balance
Total	1	1	0	+1
Current year (2026)	0	0	0	0

* Statistics were last updated on 19 July 2026.

== Performance timeline ==
Key

W	Won	F	Finalist	SF	Semi-finalist
QF	Quarter-finalist	#R	Rounds 4, 3, 2, 1	RR	Round-robin stage
Q#	Qualification round	A	Absent	w/d	Withdrew
G	Gold	S	Silver	B	Bronze
NH	Not held	N/A	Not applicable	DNQ	Did not qualify

Tournament	2009	2010	2011	2012	2013	2014	2015	2016	2017	2018	2019	2020	2021	2022	2023	2024	2025	2026	SR	Best	Ref
BWF Events
World Junior Championships	2R	QF	3R	A			N/A												0/3	QF ('10)	
World Championships	A			NH	B	B	QF	NH	S	S	G	NH	QF	w/d	2R	NH	QF	3R	1/10	G ('19)	
Olympics	NH			DNQ	NH			S	NH			B	NH			2R	NH		0/3	S ('16)	
Other Events
Commonwealth Games	NH	A	NH			B	NH			S	NH			G	NH				1/3	G ('22)	
Asian Games	NH	A	NH			2R	NH			S	NH			QF	NH			QF	0/4	S ('18)	
Asian Championships	A				QF	B	QF	2R	QF	QF	QF	NH		B	QF	2R	2R	2R	0/12	B ('14, '22)	
BWF Superseries / Grand Prix										BWF World Tour											
Malaysia Open	A			Q1	1R	2R	A	QF	1R	SF	2R	NH		QF	1R	A		SF	0/10	SF ('18, '26)	
India Open	Q2	2R	1R	QF	SF	1R	A	QF	W	F	SF	NH		SF	1R	A	QF	1R	1/14	W ('17)	
Indonesia Masters	A						QF	A	N/A	QF	QF	2R	SF	QF	A		1R	QF	0/8	SF ('21)	
German Open	A			1R	A			QF	A	A		NH		2R	A				0/3	QF ('16)	
All England Open	A			1R	2R	1R	A	1R	QF	SF	1R	QF	SF	2R	1R	2R	1R	A	0/13	SF ('18, '21)	
Swiss Open	A			1R	2R	SF	A	QF	A			NH	F	W	2R	2R	1R	w/d	1/9	W ('22)	
Thailand Open	A			2R	A					F	w/d	1R	NH	SF	1R	A		QF	0/7	F ('18)	
Thailand Open	A			2R	A					F	w/d	QF	NH	SF	1R	A		QF	0/7	F ('18)	
Malaysia Masters	A			SF	W	A	SF	W	A	w/d	A	QF	NH	QF	SF	F	1R	A	2/9	W ('13, '16)	
Singapore Open	A			1R	A	QF	A	2R	QF	A	SF	NH		W	1R	2R	2R	QF	1/10	W ('22)	
Indonesia Open	A			2R	A	1R	1R	A	2R	QF	F	NH	SF	1R	2R	1R	2R	2R	0/12	F ('19)	
Australian Open	A					QF	1R	1R	QF	A	2R	NH		A	QF	A		SF	0/7	SF ('26)	
Macau Open	A				W	W	W	A				NH			N/A	A			3/3	W ('13, '14, '15)	
U.S. Open	A											NH			QF	A			0/1	QF ('23)	
Canada Open	NH	A										NH		A	SF	A			0/1	SF ('23)	
Japan Open	A			2R	2R	A	1R	A	2R	2R	QF	NH		w/d	1R	A	1R	W	1/9	W ('26)	
China Open	A		Q2	1R	A		2R	W	QF	QF	2R	NH			A		2R	2R	1/9	W ('16)	
Taipei Open	A						2R	A				NH		A		w/d	A		0/1	2R ('15)	
China Masters	A			SF	A			QF	A	QF	1R	NH			A	2R	QF	A	0/6	SF ('12)	
Vietnam Open	A		QF	A								NH		A					0/1	QF ('11)	
Arctic Open	A		NH	A								NH			SF	1R	A	QF	0/3	SF ('23)	
Denmark Open	A				1R	QF	F	2R	1R	1R	2R	A	QF	A	SF	QF	A	1R	0/11	F ('15)	
French Open	A				2R	1R	1R	2R	SF	QF	QF	NH	SF	A	2R	QF	A	F	0/11	F ('26)	
Hylo Open	A																	W	1/1	W ('26)	
Korea Open	A			Q2	2R	A	2R	A	W	A	1R	NH		SF	1R	A			1/7	W ('17)	
Japan Masters	NH														A	2R	A		0/1	2R ('24)	
Hong Kong Open	A		Q2	1R	1R	2R	1R	F	F	2R	2R	NH			A		1R		0/10	F ('16, '17)	
Syed Modi International	QF	SF	2R	F	NH	F	SF	2R	W	w/d	A	NH		W	A	W	A		3/10	W ('17, '22, '24)	
Superseries / World Tour Finals	DNQ							SF	F	W	RR	RR	F	w/d	DNQ				1/6	W ('18)	
Spain Masters	NH									A				NH	F	QF	NH		0/2	F ('23)	
Year-end ranking	255	151	31	19	11	11	12	6	3	3	6	7	7	7	11	15	18		2		
Tournament	2009	2010	2011	2012	2013	2014	2015	2016	2017	2018	2019	2020	2021	2022	2023	2024	2025	2026	SR	Best	Ref

== Record against selected opponents ==
Record against Year-end Finals finalists, World Championships semi-finalists, and Olympic quarter-finalists. Accurate as of 3^{rd} November 2026.

Players	Matches	Results		Difference
Players	Matches	Won	Lost	Difference
(China) Chen Yufei	17	7	10	–3
(China) Han Yue	9	8	1	+7
(China) He Bingjiao	21	9	12	–3
(China) Li Xuerui	7	4	3	+1
(China) Wang Lin	1	0	1	–1
(China) Wang Shixian	10	4	6	–2
(China) Wang Yihan	7	3	4	–1
(China) Wang Zhiyi	9	3	6	-3
(China) Zhang Yiman	5	2	3	–1
(Chinese Taipei) Tai Tzu-ying	24	5	19	–14
(Denmark) Tine Baun	1	0	1	–1
(Germany) Juliane Schenk	2	0	2	–2
(Hong Kong) Yip Pui Yin	4	4	0	+4
(India) Saina Nehwal	4	1	3	–2

Players	Matches	Results		Difference
Players	Matches	Won	Lost	Difference
(Indonesia) Lindaweni Fanetri	10	8	2	+6
(Indonesia) Gregoria Mariska Tunjung	14	10	4	+6
(Indonesia) Putri Kusuma Wardani	6	3	3	0
(Japan) Minatsu Mitani	4	3	1	+2
(Japan) Nozomi Okuhara	20	11	9	+2
(Japan) Akane Yamaguchi	31	16	15	+1
(Japan) Aya Ohori	14	13	1	+12
(South Korea) An Se-young	11	0	11	–11
(South Korea) Bae Yeon-ju	5	1	4	–3
(South Korea) Sung Ji-hyun	17	9	8	+1
(Spain) Carolina Marín	18	6	12	–6
(Thailand) Porntip Buranaprasertsuk	10	6	4	+2
(Thailand) Ratchanok Intanon	14	4	10	–6
(Thailand) Pornpawee Chochuwong	12	7	5	+2

== See also ==
- Badminton in India
- India national badminton team
- List of Indian sportswomen

Olympic Games
Preceded by Mary Kom; Manpreet Singh	Flagbearer for India (with Sharath Kamal); París 2024	Succeeded by Incumbent
