= BWF Future Series =

Badminton championships

The BWF Future Series is a grade 3 and level 3 tournaments part of Continental Circuit of BWF tournaments along with International Challenge (level 1) and International Series (level 2), sanctioned by Badminton World Federation (BWF) since 2007.

== Features ==
=== World Ranking points ===
The BWF Future Series offers tenth only to level ranking point to BWF tournaments (after World Championship, World Tour Finals, Super 1000, Super 750, Super 500, Super 300, Super 100, International Challenge and International Series), according to World Ranking system.
