= 2008 Copenhagen Masters =

The 2008 Copenhagen Masters in badminton was the 16th edition of the Copenhagen Masters. It was held in Copenhagen, from December 27 to December 29, 2008.

Only three categories were played: men's singles, women's singles and men's doubles.

== Men's singles ==
=== Group 1 ===
Player	Pld	W	L	Pts
(Denmark) Kenneth Jonassen	2	2	0	2
(Indonesia) Sony Dwi Kuncoro	2	1	1	1
(Poland) Przemyslaw Wacha	2	0	2	0

December 27, 2007
Sony Dwi Kuncoro (Indonesia)	21-17, 20-17 retired	(Poland) Przemyslaw Wacha
Kenneth Jonassen (Denmark)	21-17, 21-14	(Poland) Przemyslaw Wacha
December 28, 2007
Kenneth Jonassen (Denmark)	21-17, 21-15	(Indonesia) Sony Dwi Kuncoro

=== Group 2 ===
Player	Pld	W	L	Pts
(Denmark) Peter Gade	2	2	0	2
(Malaysia) Wong Choong Hann	2	1	1	1
(Denmark) Joachim Persson	2	0	2	0

December 27, 2007
Peter Gade (Denmark)	21-17, 20-22, 21-12	(Denmark) Joachim Persson
Wong Choong Hann (Malaysia)	21-11, 21-17	(Denmark) Joachim Persson
December 28, 2007
Peter Gade (Denmark)	21-7, 21-19	(Malaysia) Wong Choong Hann

=== Finals ===
Final
(Denmark) Peter Gade	21	21
(Denmark) Kenneth Jonassen	14	15

== Women's singles ==
=== Group 1 ===
Player	Pld	W	L	Pts
(Denmark) Tine Rasmussen	2	2	0	2
(Indonesia) Adriyanti Firdasari	2	1	1	1
(Netherlands) Judith Meulendijks	2	0	2	0

December 27, 2007
Tine Rasmussen (Denmark)	21-17, 21-14	(Netherlands) Judith Meulendijks
Adriyanti Firdasari (Indonesia)	21-8, 16-21, 21-15	(Netherlands) Judith Meulendijks
December 28, 2007
Tine Rasmussen (Denmark)	22-20, 21-14	(Indonesia) Adriyanti Firdasari

=== Group 2 ===
Player	Pld	W	L	Pts
(Germany) Xu Huaiwen	2	2	0	2
(France) Pi Hongyan	2	1	1	1
(Denmark) Nanna Brosolat jensen	2	0	2	0

December 27, 2007
Xu Huaiwen (Germany)	21-18, 21-19	(Denmark) Nanna Brosolat jensen
Xu Huaiwen (Germany)	15-21, 21-12, 21-19	(France) Pi Hongyan
December 28, 2007
Pi Hongyan (France)	21-10, 21-10	(Denmark) Nanna Brosolat jensen

=== Finals ===
Final
(Denmark) Tine Rasmussen	21	21
(Germany) Xu Huaiwen	18	17

== Men's doubles ==
=== Group 1 ===
Player	Pld	W	L	Pts
(Denmark) Mathias Boe (Denmark) Carsten Mogensen	2	2	0	2
(Poland) Michal Logosz (Poland) Robert Mateusiak	2	1	1	1
(Indonesia) Markis Kido (Indonesia) Hendra Setiawan	2	0	2	0

December 27, 2007
Mathias Boe (Denmark); Carsten Mogensen (Denmark)	21-18, 21-18	(Poland) Michal Logosz (Poland) Robert Mateusiak
December 28, 2007
Mathias Boe (Denmark); Carsten Mogensen (Denmark)	21-17, 21-15	(Indonesia) Markis Kido (Indonesia) Hendra Setiawan
Michal Logosz (Poland); Robert Mateusiak (Poland)	21-8, 21-17	(Indonesia) Markis Kido (Indonesia) Hendra Setiawan

=== Group 2 ===
Player	Pld	W	L	Pts
(Denmark) Lars Paaske (Denmark) Jonas Rasmussen	2	2	0	2
(Malaysia) Mak Hee Chun (Malaysia) Teo Kok Siang	2	1	1	1
(Netherlands) Ruud Bosch (Netherlands) Koen Ridder	2	0	2	0

December 27, 2007
Lars Paaske (Denmark); Jonas Rasmussen (Denmark)	21-12, 21-15	(Netherlands) Ruud Bosch (Netherlands) Koen Ridder
December 28, 2007
Mak Hee Chun (Malaysia); Teo Kok Siang (Malaysia)	23-21, 24-22	(Netherlands) Ruud Bosch (Netherlands) Koen Ridder
Lars Paaske (Denmark); Jonas Rasmussen (Denmark)	21-15, 21-16	(Malaysia) Mak Hee Chun (Malaysia) Teo Kok Siang

=== Finals ===
Final
(Denmark) Lars Paaske (Denmark) Jonas Rasmussen	14	21	21
(Denmark) Mathias Boe (Denmark) Carsten Mogensen	21	13	19
