= 2012 Copenhagen Masters =

Yonex Copenhagen Masters
Tournament details
- Dates: 27 December 2012– 28 December 2012
- Edition: 20
- Competitors: 20 from 5 nations
- Venue: Falconer Salen
- Location: Copenhagen, Denmark

Champions
- Men's singles: (Denmark) Jan Ø. Jørgensen
- Men's doubles: (Denmark) Mads Pieler Kolding (Denmark) Carsten Mogensen
- Mixed doubles: (Denmark) Joachim Fischer (Denmark) Christinna Pedersen

The 2012 Copenhagen Masters was the 20th edition of the invitational badminton tournament Copenhagen Masters, held in Falconer Salen in Copenhagen.

Three competitions were held: Men's singles, won by Jan Ø. Jørgensen, men's doubles, won by Carsten Mogensen and Mads Pieler Kolding (Kolding replaced Mathias Boe for the final after Boe fell ill on the day of the final) and mixed doubles, won by Joachim Fischer and Christinna Pedersen. In addition, Peter Gade played his final match at the top level, an exhibition match against Lin Dan, where Gade emerged victorious.

== Results ==
=== Men's singles ===
Semifinals
(Denmark) Jan Ø. Jørgensen	21	21
(Thailand) Boonsak Ponsana	9	11
(Hong Kong) Hu Yun	17	23	21
(Denmark) Viktor Axelsen	21	21	14

Final
(Denmark) Jan Ø. Jørgensen	21	21
(Hong Kong) Hu Yun	12	11

=== Men's doubles ===
Semifinals
(Denmark) Mathias Boe (Denmark) Carsten Mogensen	21	22
(Indonesia) Ricky Karanda Suwardi (Indonesia) Muhammad Ulinnuha	5	20
(Malaysia) Mohd Zakry Abdul Latif (Malaysia) Mohd Fairuzizuan Mohd Tazari (ret.)	20	9
(Denmark) Rasmus Bonde (Denmark) Mads Conrad-Petersen	22	15

Final
(Denmark) Mads Pieler Kolding (Denmark) Carsten Mogensen	23	16	23
(Denmark) Rasmus Bonde (Denmark) Mads Conrad-Petersen	21	21	21

Mathias Boe fell ill with the flu on the day of the final and was replaced by Mads Pieler Kolding.

=== Mixed doubles ===
Semifinals
(Denmark) Joachim Fischer (Denmark) Christinna Pedersen	21	21
(Indonesia) Fran Kurniawan (Indonesia) Shendy Puspa Irawati	10	12
(Thailand) Sudket Prapakamol (Thailand) Saralee Thoungthongkam	14	21	21
(Denmark) Mads Pieler Kolding (Denmark) Kamilla Rytter Juhl	21	11	11

Final
(Denmark) Joachim Fischer (Denmark) Christinna Pedersen	21	21
(Thailand) Sudket Prapakamol (Thailand) Saralee Thoungthongkam	19	17

=== Gade exhibition ===
December 27, 2012 Games	1	2	3
(China) Lin Dan	22	16	14
(Denmark) Peter Gade	20	21	21
Duration: 1 hour, 4 minutes
