= 2019 BWF World Tour Finals =

Badminton tournament in Guangzhou, China

Tournament details
- Dates: 11–15 December
- Edition: 2nd
- Level: World Tour Finals
- Total prize money: US$1,500,000
- Venue: Tianhe Gymnasium
- Location: Tianhe, Guangzhou, China

Champions
- Men's singles: (Japan) Kento Momota
- Women's singles: (China) Chen Yufei
- Men's doubles: (Indonesia) Mohammad Ahsan (Indonesia) Hendra Setiawan
- Women's doubles: (China) Chen Qingchen (China) Jia Yifan
- Mixed doubles: (China) Zheng Siwei (China) Huang Yaqiong

The 2019 BWF World Tour Finals (officially known as the HSBC BWF World Tour Finals 2019 for sponsorship reasons) was the final tournament of the 2019 BWF World Tour. It was held from 11 to 15 December 2019 in Guangzhou, China and had a total prize of $1,500,000.

== Tournament ==
The 2019 BWF World Tour Finals was the second edition of the BWF World Tour Finals and was organized by the Guangzhou Sports Bureau, Guangzhou Sports Competitions Centre, Guangzhou Badminton Administrative Centre, and Guangzhou Badminton Association. It was hosted by the Chinese Badminton Association and Guangzhou Municipal Government with sanction from the BWF.

=== Venue ===
This international tournament was held at the Tianhe Gymnasium in Tianhe, Guangzhou, China.

=== Point distribution ===
Below is the point distribution for each phase of the tournament based on the BWF points system for the BWF World Tour Finals event.

Winner	Runner-up	Semi-finalists	3rd in Group	4th in Group
12,000	10,200	8,400	6,600	4,800

=== Prize money ===
The total prize money for this tournament was US$1,500,000. Distribution of prize money was in accordance with BWF regulations.

Achievement	Winner(s)	Runner(s)-up	Semi-finalist(s)	3rd in group	4th in group
Singles	$120,000	$60,000	$30,000	$16,500	$9,000
Doubles	$126,000	$60,000	$30,000	$19,500	$10,500

== Representatives ==
=== Eligible players ===
Below are the eligible players for World Tour Finals. Final ranking used was released on 26 November 2019, and not counting the results from the Syed Modi International. Players who won titles at the 2019 BWF World Championships are marked in bold.

==== Men's singles ====
Rank	NOCs	Players	Performances		
Rank	NOCs	Players	Winner(s)	Runner(s)-up	Semi-finalists
1	Japan (1)	**Kento Momota**	8: Super 1000: All England Open, China Open; Super 750: Japan Open, Denmark Open, Fuzhou China Open; Super 500: Singapore Open, Korea Open; Super 300: German Open	1: Super 500: Indonesia Masters	
2	Chinese Taipei (1)	Chou Tien-chen	3: Super 1000: Indonesia Open; Super 500: Thailand Open; Super 300: Chinese Taipei Open	2: Super 750: Fuzhou China Open; Super 500: Korea Open	3: Super 500: Singapore Open; Super 300: German Open, Australian Open
3	Indonesia (1)	Jonatan Christie	2: Super 300: New Zealand Open, Australian Open	2: Super 750: Japan Open, French Open	3: Super 750: Malaysia Open, Super 500: Indonesia Masters, Hong Kong Open
4	China (1)	Chen Long	1: Super 750: French Open	3: Super 750: Malaysia Open, Denmark Open; Super 500: Malaysia Masters	2: Super 1000: China Open; Super 300: Swiss Open
5	Denmark (1)	Viktor Axelsen	2: Super 500: India Open; Super 300: Spain Masters	1: Super 1000: All England Open	5: Super 750: Denmark Open, French Open; Super 500: Malaysia Masters, Indonesia Masters, Singapore Open
6	Indonesia (2)	Anthony Sinisuka Ginting		4: Super 1000: China Open; Super 500: Singapore Open, Hong Kong Open; Super 300: Australian Open	2: Super 750: French Open; Super 300: Swiss Open
7	Denmark (2)	Anders Antonsen	1: Super 500: Indonesia Masters	2: Super 1000: Indonesia Open; Super 300: Spain Masters	2: Super 1000: China Open; Super 750: Fuzhou China Open
8	Chinese Taipei (2)	Wang Tzu-wei			3: Super 500: Korea Open; Super 300: Australian Open; Super 100: Canada Open

==== Women's singles ====
Rank	NOCs	Players	Performances		
Rank	NOCs	Players	Winner(s)	Runner(s)-up	Semi-finalists
1	China (1)	Chen Yufei	6: Super 1000: All England Open; Super 750: Fuzhou China Open; Super 500: Thailand Open, Hong Kong Open; Super 300: Swiss Open, Australian Open		6: Super 1000: Indonesia Open, China Open; Super 750: Malaysia Open, Japan Open, Denmark Open; Super 500: Indonesia Masters
2	Thailand (1)	Ratchanok Intanon	2: Super 500: Malaysia Masters, India Open	4: Super 500: Thailand Open, Korea Open, Hong Kong Open; Super 300: German Open	1: Super 300: Australian Open
3	Japan (1)	Akane Yamaguchi	3: Super 1000: Indonesia Open; Super 750: Japan Open; Super 300: German Open	1: Super 750: Malaysia Open	6: Super 1000: All England Open; Super 750: French Open; Super 500: Singapore Open, Hong Kong Open; Super 300: New Zealand Open, Korea Masters
4	Japan (2)	Nozomi Okuhara		5: Super 750: Japan Open, Denmark Open, Fuzhou China Open; Super 500: Singapore Open; Super 300: Australian Open	3: Super 1000: All England Open; Super 750: Malaysia Open; Super 300: German Open
5	Chinese Taipei (1)	Tai Tzu-ying	3: Super 750: Malaysia Open, Denmark Open; Super 500: Singapore Open	2: Super 1000: All England Open, China Open	4: Super 1000: Indonesia Open; Super 750: French Open, Fuzhou China Open; Super 500: Korea Open
6	China (2)	He Bingjiao	1: Super 500: Korea Open	1: Super 500: India Open	1: Super 500: Indonesia Masters
7	Thailand (2)	Busanan Ongbamrungphan		1: Super 300: Thailand Masters	
15	India (1)	**P. V. Sindhu**		1: Super 1000: Indonesia Open	2: Super 500: India Open, Singapore Open

==== Men's doubles ====
Rank	NOCs	Players	Performances		
Rank	NOCs	Players	Winner(s)	Runner(s)-up	Semi-finalists
1	Indonesia (1)	Marcus Fernaldi Gideon	8: Super 1000: Indonesia Open, China Open; Super 750: Japan Open, Denmark Open, French Open, Fuzhou China Open; Super 500: Malaysia Masters, Indonesia Masters		1: Super 500: Singapore Open
1	Indonesia (1)	Kevin Sanjaya Sukamuljo	8: Super 1000: Indonesia Open, China Open; Super 750: Japan Open, Denmark Open, French Open, Fuzhou China Open; Super 500: Malaysia Masters, Indonesia Masters		1: Super 500: Singapore Open
2	Indonesia (2)	**Mohammad Ahsan**	2: Super 1000: All England Open; Super 300: New Zealand Open	7: Super 1000: Indonesia Open, China Open; Super 750: Japan Open, Denmark Open; Super 500: Indonesia Masters, Singapore Open, Hong Kong Open	
2	Indonesia (2)	**Hendra Setiawan**	2: Super 1000: All England Open; Super 300: New Zealand Open	7: Super 1000: Indonesia Open, China Open; Super 750: Japan Open, Denmark Open; Super 500: Indonesia Masters, Singapore Open, Hong Kong Open	
3	Japan (1)	Takeshi Kamura	1: Super 500: Singapore Open	5: Super 750: Malaysia Open, Fuzhou China Open; Super 500: Korea Open; Super 300: German Open, Australian Open	4: Super 1000: All England Open; Super 750: Japan Open, Denmark Open; Super 300: New Zealand Open
3	Japan (1)	Keigo Sonoda	1: Super 500: Singapore Open	5: Super 750: Malaysia Open, Fuzhou China Open; Super 500: Korea Open; Super 300: German Open, Australian Open	4: Super 1000: All England Open; Super 750: Japan Open, Denmark Open; Super 300: New Zealand Open
4	Chinese Taipei (1)	Lee Yang	4: Super 500: India Open; Super 300: Spain Masters, Korea Masters; Super 100: Orléans Masters	2: Super 300: Swiss Open, U.S. Open	1: Super 300: Chinese Taipei Open
4	Chinese Taipei (1)	Wang Chi-lin	4: Super 500: India Open; Super 300: Spain Masters, Korea Masters; Super 100: Orléans Masters	2: Super 300: Swiss Open, U.S. Open	1: Super 300: Chinese Taipei Open
5	China (1)	Li Junhui	2: Super 750: Malaysia Open; Super 300: Macau Open	1: Super 500: Thailand Open	7: Super 1000: Indonesia Open, China Open; Super 750: Japan Open; Super 500: Singapore Open, Korea Open, Hong Kong Open; Super 300: Australian Open
5	China (1)	Liu Yuchen	2: Super 750: Malaysia Open; Super 300: Macau Open	1: Super 500: Thailand Open	7: Super 1000: Indonesia Open, China Open; Super 750: Japan Open; Super 500: Singapore Open, Korea Open, Hong Kong Open; Super 300: Australian Open
7	Japan (2)	Hiroyuki Endo	1: Super 300: German Open	1: Super 300: New Zealand Open	3: Super 750: French Open; Super 500: Thailand Open, Hong Kong Open
7	Japan (2)	Yuta Watanabe	1: Super 300: German Open	1: Super 300: New Zealand Open	3: Super 750: French Open; Super 500: Thailand Open, Hong Kong Open
8	Chinese Taipei (2)	Lu Ching-yao		1: Super 300: Thailand Masters	3: Super 750: Denmark Open; Super 300: Spain Masters; Super 100: Canada Open
8	Chinese Taipei (2)	Yang Po-han		1: Super 300: Thailand Masters	3: Super 750: Denmark Open; Super 300: Spain Masters; Super 100: Canada Open
9	Malaysia (1)	Aaron Chia		1: Super 1000: All England Open	2: Super 750: Fuzhou China Open; Super 500: Malaysia Masters
9	Malaysia (1)	Soh Wooi Yik		1: Super 1000: All England Open	2: Super 750: Fuzhou China Open; Super 500: Malaysia Masters

==== Women's doubles ====
Rank	NOCs	Players	Performances		
Rank	NOCs	Players	Winner(s)	Runner(s)-up	Semi-finalists
1	Japan (1)	Yuki Fukushima	4: Super 1000: Indonesia Open; Super 750: Fuzhou China Open; Super 500: Malaysia Masters; Super 300: Australian Open		7: Super 1000: All England Open, China Open; Super 750: Denmark Open, French Open; Super 500: Singapore Open; Super 300: German Open, New Zealand Open
1	Japan (1)	Sayaka Hirota	4: Super 1000: Indonesia Open; Super 750: Fuzhou China Open; Super 500: Malaysia Masters; Super 300: Australian Open		7: Super 1000: All England Open, China Open; Super 750: Denmark Open, French Open; Super 500: Singapore Open; Super 300: German Open, New Zealand Open
2	Japan (2)	**Mayu Matsumoto**	1: Super 500: Singapore Open	2: Super 1000: All England Open; Super 750: Japan Open	7: Super 750: Denmark Open, French Open, Fuzhou China Open; Super 500: Malaysia Masters, Indonesia Masters, Hong Kong Open; Super 300: German Open
2	Japan (2)	**Wakana Nagahara**	1: Super 500: Singapore Open	2: Super 1000: All England Open; Super 750: Japan Open	7: Super 750: Denmark Open, French Open, Fuzhou China Open; Super 500: Malaysia Masters, Indonesia Masters, Hong Kong Open; Super 300: German Open
3	South Korea (1)	Kim So-yeong	4: Super 750: Japan Open; Super 500: Korea Open; Super 300: Spain Masters, New Zealand Open	3: Super 750: French Open; Super 500: Indonesia Masters; Super 300: Chinese Taipei Open	
3	South Korea (1)	Kong Hee-yong	4: Super 750: Japan Open; Super 500: Korea Open; Super 300: Spain Masters, New Zealand Open	3: Super 750: French Open; Super 500: Indonesia Masters; Super 300: Chinese Taipei Open	
5	China (1)	Chen Qingchen	4: Super 1000: All England Open, China Open; Super 750: Malaysia Open; Super 500: Hong Kong Open	2: Super 750: Denmark Open; Super 300: Australian Open	2: Super 1000: Indonesia Open; Super 750: Fuzhou China Open
5	China (1)	Jia Yifan	4: Super 1000: All England Open, China Open; Super 750: Malaysia Open; Super 500: Hong Kong Open	2: Super 750: Denmark Open; Super 300: Australian Open	2: Super 1000: Indonesia Open; Super 750: Fuzhou China Open
6	Indonesia (1)	Greysia Polii	1: Super 500: India Open	1: Super 500: Malaysia Masters	3: Super 500: Indonesia Masters; Super 300: Australian Open, Chinese Taipei Open
6	Indonesia (1)	Apriyani Rahayu	1: Super 500: India Open	1: Super 500: Malaysia Masters	3: Super 500: Indonesia Masters; Super 300: Australian Open, Chinese Taipei Open
7	China (2)	Du Yue	2: Super 300: German Open, Macau Open	3: Super 750: Malaysia Open; Super 500: Thailand Open	
7	China (2)	Li Yinhui	2: Super 300: German Open, Macau Open	3: Super 750: Malaysia Open; Super 500: Thailand Open	
8	South Korea (2)	Lee So-hee	1: Super 750: French Open	2: Super 750: Fuzhou China Open; Super 500: Korea Open	3: Super 1000: Indonesia Open; Super 500: Thailand Open; Super 300: Korea Masters
8	South Korea (2)	Shin Seung-chan	1: Super 750: French Open	2: Super 750: Fuzhou China Open; Super 500: Korea Open	3: Super 1000: Indonesia Open; Super 500: Thailand Open; Super 300: Korea Masters
9	Thailand (1)	Jongkolphan Kititharakul	1: Super 300: Chinese Taipei Open	1: Super 300: Macau Open	2: Super 750: Malaysia Open; Super 500: India Open
9	Thailand (1)	Rawinda Prajongjai	1: Super 300: Chinese Taipei Open	1: Super 300: Macau Open	2: Super 750: Malaysia Open; Super 500: India Open

==== Mixed doubles ====
Rank	NOCs	Players	Performances		
Rank	NOCs	Players	Winner(s)	Runner(s)-up	Semi-finalists
1	Thailand (1)	Dechapol Puavaranukroh	3: Super 500: Singapore Open, Korea Open; Super 300: Macau Open	2: Super 500: Malaysia Masters; Super 300: Thailand Masters	3: Super 1000: China Open; Super 750: Malaysia Open; Super 500: Thailand Open
1	Thailand (1)	Sapsiree Taerattanachai	3: Super 500: Singapore Open, Korea Open; Super 300: Macau Open	2: Super 500: Malaysia Masters; Super 300: Thailand Masters	3: Super 1000: China Open; Super 750: Malaysia Open; Super 500: Thailand Open
2	China (1)	**Zheng Siwei**	5: Super 1000: All England Open, Indonesia Open, China Open; Super 750: Malaysia Open; Super 500: Indonesia Masters	3: Super 750: French Open, Fuzhou China Open; Super 500: Korea Open	1: Super 500: Singapore Open
2	China (1)	**Huang Yaqiong**	5: Super 1000: All England Open, Indonesia Open, China Open; Super 750: Malaysia Open; Super 500: Indonesia Masters	3: Super 750: French Open, Fuzhou China Open; Super 500: Korea Open	1: Super 500: Singapore Open
3	Indonesia (1)	Praveen Jordan	2: Super 750: Denmark Open, French Open	4: Super 750: Japan Open; Super 500: India Open; Super 300: New Zealand Open, Australian Open	1: Super 1000: All England Open
3	Indonesia (1)	Melati Daeva Oktavianti	2: Super 750: Denmark Open, French Open	4: Super 750: Japan Open; Super 500: India Open; Super 300: New Zealand Open, Australian Open	1: Super 1000: All England Open
4	China (2)	Wang Yilyu	5: Super 750: Japan Open, Fuzhou China Open; Super 500: India Open, Thailand Open; Super 300: Australian Open	4: Super 1000: Indonesia Open, China Open; Super 750: Malaysia Open, Denmark Open	
4	China (2)	Huang Dongping	5: Super 750: Japan Open, Fuzhou China Open; Super 500: India Open, Thailand Open; Super 300: Australian Open	4: Super 1000: Indonesia Open, China Open; Super 750: Malaysia Open, Denmark Open	
5	Malaysia (1)	Chan Peng Soon	2: Super 300: Thailand Masters, New Zealand Open		5: Super 1000: Indonesia Open; Super 750: Japan Open; Super 500: Malaysia Masters, Indonesia Masters; Super 300: Chinese Taipei Open
5	Malaysia (1)	Goh Liu Ying	2: Super 300: Thailand Masters, New Zealand Open		5: Super 1000: Indonesia Open; Super 750: Japan Open; Super 500: Malaysia Masters, Indonesia Masters; Super 300: Chinese Taipei Open
6	Japan (1)	Yuta Watanabe	2: Super 500: Malaysia Masters, Hong Kong Open	1: Super 1000: All England Open; Super 500: Thailand Open	4: Super 750: French Open, Fuzhou China Open; Super 500: Indonesia Masters; Super 300: Australian Open
6	Japan (1)	Arisa Higashino	2: Super 500: Malaysia Masters, Hong Kong Open	1: Super 1000: All England Open; Super 500: Thailand Open	4: Super 750: French Open, Fuzhou China Open; Super 500: Indonesia Masters; Super 300: Australian Open
7	Indonesia (2)	Hafiz Faizal		1: Super 300: German Open	6: Super 750: Japan Open; Super 500: India Open, Singapore Open, Hong Kong Open; Super 300: New Zealand Open, Chinese Taipei Open
7	Indonesia (2)	Gloria Emanuelle Widjaja		1: Super 300: German Open	6: Super 750: Japan Open; Super 500: India Open, Singapore Open, Hong Kong Open; Super 300: New Zealand Open, Chinese Taipei Open
8	South Korea (1)	Seo Seung-jae	2: Super 300: Spain Masters, German Open	1: Super 300: Chinese Taipei Open	3: Super 1000: China Open; Super 750: Denmark Open; Super 500: Korea Open
8	South Korea (1)	Chae Yoo-jung	2: Super 300: Spain Masters, German Open	1: Super 300: Chinese Taipei Open	3: Super 1000: China Open; Super 750: Denmark Open; Super 500: Korea Open

=== Representatives by nation ===
Top Nations
Rank	Nation	MS	WS	MD	WD	XD	Total	Players
1	China	1	2	1	2	2	8	13
2	Japan	1	2	2	2	1	8	12^{§}
3	Indonesia	2		2	1	2	7	12
4	Chinese Taipei	2	1	2			5	7
5	Thailand		2		1	1	4	6
6	South Korea				2	1	3	6
7	Malaysia			1		1	2	4
8	Denmark	2					2	2
9	India		1				1	1
Total		8	8	8	8	8	40	63

§: Yuta Watanabe from Japan was the only player who played in two categories (men's doubles and mixed doubles).

== Performances by nation ==
Nation	Group stage	Semi-finals	Final	Winner(s)
China	8	5	4	3
Japan	8	7	3	1
Indonesia	7	3	2	1
Chinese Taipei	5	3	1	
Thailand	4	1		
South Korea	3	1		
Denmark	2			
Malaysia	2			
India	1			
Total	40	20	10	5

== Men's singles ==
=== Group A ===
Rank	Players	Pts	Pld	W	L	SF	SA	PF	PA
1	(Japan) Kento Momota	3	3	3	0	6	1	145	98
2	(Chinese Taipei) Wang Tzu-wei	1	3	1	2	3	4	115	127
3	(Indonesia) Jonatan Christie	1	3	1	2	2	4	101	121
4	(Denmark) Anders Antonsen	1	3	1	2	3	5	144	159

Date		Score		Set 1	Set 2	Set 3
11 Dec	Kento Momota (Japan)	2–0	(Chinese Taipei) Wang Tzu-wei	21–10	21–9	
11 Dec	Jonatan Christie (Indonesia)	2–0	(Denmark) Anders Antonsen	23–21	21–16	
12 Dec	Jonatan Christie (Indonesia)	0–2	(Chinese Taipei) Wang Tzu-wei	12–21	17–21	
12 Dec	Kento Momota (Japan)	2–1	(Denmark) Anders Antonsen	19–21	21–15	21–15
13 Dec	Kento Momota (Japan)	2–0	(Indonesia) Jonatan Christie	21–14	21–14	
13 Dec	Anders Antonsen (Denmark)	2–1	(Chinese Taipei) Wang Tzu-wei	23–21	12–21	21–12

=== Group B ===
Rank	Players	Pts	Pld	W	L	SF	SA	PF	PA
1	(Indonesia) Anthony Sinisuka Ginting	1	2	1	1	3	2	101	80
2	(China) Chen Long	1	2	1	1	2	2	65	76
3	(Chinese Taipei) Chou Tien-chen	1	2	1	1	2	3	91	101
4	(Denmark) Viktor Axelsen	Retired							

Date		Score		Set 1	Set 2	Set 3
11 Dec	Chen Long (China)	~~2–1~~	(Denmark) Viktor Axelsen	~~21–17~~	~~10–21~~	~~21–17~~
11 Dec	Chou Tien-chen (Chinese Taipei)	2–1	(Indonesia) Anthony Sinisuka Ginting	11–21	21–15	25–23
12 Dec	Chen Long (China)	0–2	(Indonesia) Anthony Sinisuka Ginting	12–21	11–21	
12 Dec	Chou Tien-chen (Chinese Taipei)	~~2–1~~	(Denmark) Viktor Axelsen	~~12–21~~	~~21–12~~	~~21–15~~
13 Dec	Chou Tien-chen (Chinese Taipei)	0–2	(China) Chen Long	15–21	19–21	
13 Dec	Viktor Axelsen (Denmark)	Retired	(Indonesia) Anthony Sinisuka Ginting	6^{r}–13		

=== Finals ===
Semi-finals
(Japan) Kento Momota	21	21
(Chinese Taipei) Wang Tzu-wei	17	12
(China) Chen Long	15	15
(Indonesia) Anthony Sinisuka Ginting	21	21

Final
(Japan) Kento Momota	17	21	21
(Indonesia) Anthony Sinisuka Ginting	21	17	14

== Women's singles ==
=== Group A ===
Rank	Players	Pts	Pld	W	L	SF	SA	PF	PA
1	(China) Chen Yufei	3	3	3	0	6	1	146	101
2	(Japan) Akane Yamaguchi	2	3	2	1	4	4	151	139
3	(India) P. V. Sindhu	1	3	1	2	4	4	139	160
4	(China) He Bingjiao	0	3	0	3	1	6	115	151

Date		Score		Set 1	Set 2	Set 3
11 Dec	Chen Yufei (China)	2–0	(China) He Bingjiao	21–9	21–18	
11 Dec	Akane Yamaguchi (Japan)	2–1	(India) P. V. Sindhu	18–21	21–18	21–8
12 Dec	Chen Yufei (China)	2–1	(India) P. V. Sindhu	20–22	21–16	21–12
12 Dec	Akane Yamaguchi (Japan)	2–1	(China) He Bingjiao	25–27	21–10	21–13
13 Dec	Chen Yufei (China)	2–0	(Japan) Akane Yamaguchi	21–14	21–10	
13 Dec	He Bingjiao (China)	0–2	(India) P. V. Sindhu	19–21	19–21	

=== Group B ===
Rank	Players	Pts	Pld	W	L	SF	SA	PF	PA
1	(Japan) Nozomi Okuhara	3	3	3	0	6	1	141	106
2	(Chinese Taipei) Tai Tzu-ying	2	3	2	1	5	3	153	135
3	(Thailand) Ratchanok Intanon	1	3	1	2	3	4	123	115
4	(Thailand) Busanan Ongbamrungphan	0	3	0	3	0	6	65	126

Date		Score		Set 1	Set 2	Set 3
11 Dec	Ratchanok Intanon (Thailand)	2–0	(Thailand) Busanan Ongbamrungphan	21–4	21–16	
11 Dec	Nozomi Okuhara (Japan)	2–1	(Chinese Taipei) Tai Tzu-ying	15–21	21–18	21–19
12 Dec	Nozomi Okuhara (Japan)	2–0	(Thailand) Busanan Ongbamrungphan	21–12	21–10	
12 Dec	Ratchanok Intanon (Thailand)	1–2	(Chinese Taipei) Tai Tzu-ying	21–11	18–21	16–21
13 Dec	Ratchanok Intanon (Thailand)	0–2	(Japan) Nozomi Okuhara	14–21	12–21	
13 Dec	Tai Tzu-ying (Chinese Taipei)	2–0	(Thailand) Busanan Ongbamrungphan	21–14	21–9	

=== Finals ===
Semi-finals
(China) Chen Yufei	21	21
(Japan) Akane Yamaguchi	18	9
(Chinese Taipei) Tai Tzu-ying	21	21
(Japan) Nozomi Okuhara	15	18

Final
(China) Chen Yufei	12	21	21
(Chinese Taipei) Tai Tzu-ying	21	12	17

== Men's doubles ==
=== Group A ===
Rank	Players	Pts	Pld	W	L	SF	SA	PF	PA
1	(Japan) Hiroyuki Endo (Japan) Yuta Watanabe	3	3	3	0	6	1	140	98
2	(Indonesia) Marcus Fernaldi Gideon (Indonesia) Kevin Sanjaya Sukamuljo	2	3	2	1	5	3	141	146
3	(China) Li Junhui (China) Liu Yuchen	1	3	1	2	3	5	134	149
4	(Japan) Takeshi Kamura (Japan) Keigo Sonoda	0	3	0	3	1	6	116	138

Date		Score		Set 1	Set 2	Set 3
11 Dec	Takeshi Kamura (Japan); Keigo Sonoda (Japan)	0–2	(Japan) Hiroyuki Endo (Japan) Yuta Watanabe	19–21	13–21	
11 Dec	Marcus Fernaldi Gideon (Indonesia); Kevin Sanjaya Sukamuljo (Indonesia)	2–1	(China) Li Junhui (China) Liu Yuchen	21–18	14–21	21–18
12 Dec	Takeshi Kamura (Japan); Keigo Sonoda (Japan)	1–2	(China) Li Junhui (China) Liu Yuchen	14–21	21–12	16–21
12 Dec	Marcus Fernaldi Gideon (Indonesia); Kevin Sanjaya Sukamuljo (Indonesia)	1–2	(Japan) Hiroyuki Endo (Japan) Yuta Watanabe	11–21	21–14	11–21
13 Dec	Li Junhui (China); Liu Yuchen (China)	0–2	(Japan) Hiroyuki Endo (Japan) Yuta Watanabe	12–21	11–21	
13 Dec	Marcus Fernaldi Gideon (Indonesia); Kevin Sanjaya Sukamuljo (Indonesia)	2–0	(Japan) Takeshi Kamura (Japan) Keigo Sonoda	21–16	21–17	

=== Group B ===
Rank	Players	Pts	Pld	W	L	SF	SA	PF	PA
1	(Chinese Taipei) Lee Yang (Chinese Taipei) Wang Chi-lin	3	3	3	0	6	1	148	121
2	(Indonesia) Mohammad Ahsan (Indonesia) Hendra Setiawan	2	3	2	1	4	3	135	127
3	(Malaysia) Aaron Chia (Malaysia) Soh Wooi Yik	1	3	1	2	3	5	153	163
4	(Chinese Taipei) Lu Ching-yao (Chinese Taipei) Yang Po-han	0	3	0	3	2	6	135	160

Date		Score		Set 1	Set 2	Set 3
11 Dec	Lee Yang (Chinese Taipei); Wang Chi-lin (Chinese Taipei)	2–0	(Chinese Taipei) Lu Ching-yao (Chinese Taipei) Yang Po-han	21–16	21–12	
11 Dec	Mohammad Ahsan (Indonesia); Hendra Setiawan (Indonesia)	2–0	(Malaysia) Aaron Chia (Malaysia) Soh Wooi Yik	21–19	21–16	
12 Dec	Lee Yang (Chinese Taipei); Wang Chi-lin (Chinese Taipei)	2–1	(Malaysia) Aaron Chia (Malaysia) Soh Wooi Yik	22–20	21–23	21–14
12 Dec	Mohammad Ahsan (Indonesia); Hendra Setiawan (Indonesia)	2–1	(Chinese Taipei) Lu Ching-yao (Chinese Taipei) Yang Po-han	21–10	15–21	21–19
13 Dec	Lu Ching-yao (Chinese Taipei); Yang Po-han (Chinese Taipei)	1–2	(Malaysia) Aaron Chia (Malaysia) Soh Wooi Yik	17–21	21–19	19–21
13 Dec	Mohammad Ahsan (Indonesia); Hendra Setiawan (Indonesia)	0–2	(Chinese Taipei) Lee Yang (Chinese Taipei) Wang Chi-lin	18–21	18–21	

=== Finals ===
Semi-finals
(Japan) Hiroyuki Endo (Japan) Yuta Watanabe	21	15	21
(Indonesia) Marcus Fernaldi Gideon (Indonesia) Kevin Sanjaya Sukamuljo	11	21	10
(Indonesia) Mohammad Ahsan (Indonesia) Hendra Setiawan	21	21
(Chinese Taipei) Lee Yang (Chinese Taipei) Wang Chi-lin	14	9

Final
(Japan) Hiroyuki Endo (Japan) Yuta Watanabe	22	19
(Indonesia) Mohammad Ahsan (Indonesia) Hendra Setiawan	24	21

== Women's doubles ==
=== Group A ===
Rank	Players	Pts	Pld	W	L	SF	SA	PF	PA
1	(Japan) Yuki Fukushima (Japan) Sayaka Hirota	3	3	3	0	6	2	158	107
2	(China) Chen Qingchen (China) Jia Yifan	2	3	2	1	4	4	140	138
3	(China) Du Yue (China) Li Yinhui	1	3	1	2	4	5	152	162
4	(Indonesia) Greysia Polii (Indonesia) Apriyani Rahayu	0	3	0	3	3	6	131	174

Date		Score		Set 1	Set 2	Set 3
11 Dec	Chen Qingchen (China); Jia Yifan (China)	2–1	(China) Du Yue (China) Li Yinhui	21–12	16–21	21–16
11 Dec	Yuki Fukushima (Japan); Sayaka Hirota (Japan)	2–1	(Indonesia) Greysia Polii (Indonesia) Apriyani Rahayu	19–21	21–5	21–9
12 Dec	Yuki Fukushima (Japan); Sayaka Hirota (Japan)	2–1	(China) Du Yue (China) Li Yinhui	10–21	24–22	21–6
12 Dec	Chen Qingchen (China); Jia Yifan (China)	2–1	(Indonesia) Greysia Polii (Indonesia) Apriyani Rahayu	17–21	21–10	21–16
13 Dec	Greysia Polii (Indonesia); Apriyani Rahayu (Indonesia)	1–2	(China) Du Yue (China) Li Yinhui	21–12	17–21	11–21
13 Dec	Yuki Fukushima (Japan); Sayaka Hirota (Japan)	2–0	(China) Chen Qingchen (China) Jia Yifan	21–10	21–13	

=== Group B ===
Rank	Players	Pts	Pld	W	L	SF	SA	PF	PA
1	(South Korea) Lee So-hee (South Korea) Shin Seung-chan	3	3	3	0	6	2	160	147
2	(Japan) Mayu Matsumoto (Japan) Wakana Nagahara	2	3	2	1	5	3	154	145
3	(South Korea) Kim So-yeong (South Korea) Kong Hee-yong	1	3	1	2	3	4	136	136
4	(Thailand) Jongkolphan Kititharakul (Thailand) Rawinda Prajongjai	0	3	0	3	1	6	130	152

Date		Score		Set 1	Set 2	Set 3
11 Dec	Kim So-yeong (South Korea); Kong Hee-yong (South Korea)	1–2	(South Korea) Lee So-hee (South Korea) Shin Seung-chan	21–18	17–21	18–21
11 Dec	Mayu Matsumoto (Japan); Wakana Nagahara (Japan)	2–1	(Thailand) Jongkolphan Kititharakul (Thailand) Rawinda Prajongjai	19–21	21–14	22–20
12 Dec	Kim So-yeong (South Korea); Kong Hee-yong (South Korea)	2–0	(Thailand) Jongkolphan Kititharakul (Thailand) Rawinda Prajongjai	24–22	21–12	
12 Dec	Mayu Matsumoto (Japan); Wakana Nagahara (Japan)	1–2	(South Korea) Lee So-hee (South Korea) Shin Seung-chan	21–13	16–21	13–21
13 Dec	Lee So-hee (South Korea); Shin Seung-chan (South Korea)	2–0	(Thailand) Jongkolphan Kititharakul (Thailand) Rawinda Prajongjai	22–20	23–21	
13 Dec	Mayu Matsumoto (Japan); Wakana Nagahara (Japan)	2–0	(South Korea) Kim So-yeong (South Korea) Kong Hee-yong	21–17	21–18	

=== Finals ===
Semi-finals
(Japan) Yuki Fukushima (Japan) Sayaka Hirota	21	17	9
(Japan) Mayu Matsumoto (Japan) Wakana Nagahara	13	21	21
(China) Chen Qingchen (China) Jia Yifan	21	21
(South Korea) Lee So-hee (South Korea) Shin Seung-chan	15	8

Final
(Japan) Mayu Matsumoto (Japan) Wakana Nagahara	14	10
(China) Chen Qingchen (China) Jia Yifan	21	21

== Mixed doubles ==
=== Group A ===
Rank	Players	Pts	Pld	W	L	SF	SA	PF	PA
1	(China) Wang Yilyu (China) Huang Dongping	3	3	3	0	6	1	143	110
2	(Thailand) Dechapol Puavaranukroh (Thailand) Sapsiree Taerattanachai	2	3	2	1	4	2	125	120
3	(South Korea) Seo Seung-jae (South Korea) Chae Yoo-jung	1	3	1	2	3	4	128	118
4	(Malaysia) Chan Peng Soon (Malaysia) Goh Liu Ying	0	3	0	3	0	6	85	133

Date		Score		Set 1	Set 2	Set 3
11 Dec	Dechapol Puavaranukroh (Thailand); Sapsiree Taerattanachai (Thailand)	2–0	(South Korea) Seo Seung-jae (South Korea) Chae Yoo-jung	21–16	21–19	
11 Dec	Wang Yilyu (China); Huang Dongping (China)	2–0	(Malaysia) Chan Peng Soon (Malaysia) Goh Liu Ying	21–11	21–14	
12 Dec	Wang Yilyu (China); Huang Dongping (China)	2–1	(South Korea) Seo Seung-jae (South Korea) Chae Yoo-jung	16–21	21–12	21–18
12 Dec	Dechapol Puavaranukroh (Thailand); Sapsiree Taerattanachai (Thailand)	2–0	(Malaysia) Chan Peng Soon (Malaysia) Goh Liu Ying	21–16	28–26	
13 Dec	Dechapol Puavaranukroh (Thailand); Sapsiree Taerattanachai (Thailand)	0–2	(China) Wang Yilyu (China) Huang Dongping	14–21	20–22	
13 Dec	Chan Peng Soon (Malaysia); Goh Liu Ying (Malaysia)	0–2	(South Korea) Seo Seung-jae (South Korea) Chae Yoo-jung	10–21	8–21	

=== Group B ===
Rank	Players	Pts	Pld	W	L	SF	SA	PF	PA
1	(Japan) Yuta Watanabe (Japan) Arisa Higashino	3	3	3	0	6	1	144	107
2	(China) Zheng Siwei (China) Huang Yaqiong	2	3	2	1	4	4	150	145
3	(Indonesia) Hafiz Faizal (Indonesia) Gloria Emanuelle Widjaja	1	3	1	2	3	4	122	134
4	(Indonesia) Praveen Jordan (Indonesia) Melati Daeva Oktavianti	0	3	0	3	2	6	130	160

Date		Score		Set 1	Set 2	Set 3
11 Dec	Praveen Jordan (Indonesia); Melati Daeva Oktavianti (Indonesia)	0–2	(Indonesia) Hafiz Faizal (Indonesia) Gloria Emanuelle Widjaja	11–21	19–21	
11 Dec	Zheng Siwei (China); Huang Yaqiong (China)	0–2	(Japan) Yuta Watanabe (Japan) Arisa Higashino	15–21	15–21	
12 Dec	Praveen Jordan (Indonesia); Melati Daeva Oktavianti (Indonesia)	1–2	(Japan) Yuta Watanabe (Japan) Arisa Higashino	15–21	21–18	15–21
12 Dec	Zheng Siwei (China); Huang Yaqiong (China)	2–1	(Indonesia) Hafiz Faizal (Indonesia) Gloria Emanuelle Widjaja	21–15	20–22	21–17
13 Dec	Yuta Watanabe (Japan); Arisa Higashino (Japan)	2–0	(Indonesia) Hafiz Faizal (Indonesia) Gloria Emanuelle Widjaja	21–14	21–12	
13 Dec	Zheng Siwei (China); Huang Yaqiong (China)	2–1	(Indonesia) Praveen Jordan (Indonesia) Melati Daeva Oktavianti	21–8	15–21	22–20

=== Finals ===
Semi-finals
(China) Wang Yilyu (China) Huang Dongping	21	21
(Thailand) Dechapol Puavaranukroh (Thailand) Sapsiree Taerattanachai	17	16
(China) Zheng Siwei (China) Huang Yaqiong	21	12	21
(Japan) Yuta Watanabe (Japan) Arisa Higashino	7	21	16

Final
(China) Wang Yilyu (China) Huang Dongping	14	14
(China) Zheng Siwei (China) Huang Yaqiong	21	21

Preceded by 2019 Syed Modi International	BWF World Tour; 2019 BWF season	Succeeded by 2020 Malaysia Masters
