= BWF International Challenge =

Badminton championships

The BWF International Challenge is a grade 3 and level 1 tournament part of Continental Circuit of BWF tournaments along with International Series (level 2) and Future Series (level 3), sanctioned by Badminton World Federation (BWF) since 2007.

== Features ==
=== Prize money ===
An International Challenge tournament offers minimum prize money of US$ 15,000.

=== World Ranking points ===
The BWF International Challenge offers eighth only to level ranking point to BWF tournaments (after World Championship, World Tour Finals, Super 1000, Super 750, Super 500, Super 300, Super 100), according to the World Ranking system.
