= BWF International Series =

Badminton tournament

The BWF International Series is a grade 3 and level 2 tournament part of Continental Circuit of BWF tournaments along with International Challenge (level 1) and Future Series (level 3), sanctioned by Badminton World Federation (BWF) since 2007.

== Features ==
=== Prize money ===
An International Series tournament offers minimum prize money of US$5,000.

=== World Ranking points ===
The BWF International Series offers ninth only level ranking point to BWF tournaments (after World Championship, World Tour Finals, Super 1000, Super 750, Super 500, Super 300, Super 100 and International Challenge), according to the World Ranking system.
