= 2015 Copenhagen Masters =

Yonex Copenhagen Masters
Tournament details
- Dates: 27 December 2015– 28 December 2015
- Edition: 23
- Nations: 5
- Venue: Falconer Salen
- Location: Copenhagen, Denmark

Champions
- Men's singles: (Denmark) Viktor Axelsen
- Women's singles: (Denmark) Line Kjærsfeldt
- Men's doubles: (Denmark) Mathias Boe (Denmark) Carsten Mogensen
- Women's doubles: (Denmark) Christinna Pedersen (Denmark) Kamilla Rytter Juhl
- Mixed doubles: (Denmark) Joachim Fischer (Denmark) Christinna Pedersen

The 2015 Copenhagen Masters was the 23rd edition of the invitational badminton tournament Copenhagen Masters, held in Falconer Salen in Copenhagen.

== Results ==
=== Men's singles ===
Semifinals
1	(Denmark) Anders Antonsen	21	14	21
4	(India) Gurusai Dutt	18	21	19
3	(India) B. Sai Praneeth	14	18
2	(Denmark) Viktor Axelsen	21	21

Finals
(Denmark) Anders Antonsen	10	15
(Denmark) Viktor Axelsen	21	21

=== Women's singles ===
Finals
(Denmark) Line Kjærsfeldt	21	21
(India) P. V. Sindhu	12	19

=== Men's doubles ===
Semifinals
1	(Denmark) Mathias Boe (Denmark) Carsten Mogensen	22	21
4	(Malaysia) Hoon Thien How (Malaysia) Lim Khim Wah	20	12
3	(Indonesia) Wahyu Nayaka (Indonesia) Ade Yusuf	21	16	24
2	(Denmark) Mads Conrad-Petersen (Denmark) Mads Pieler Kolding	14	21	22

Finals
(Denmark) Mathias Boe (Denmark) Carsten Mogensen	21	21
(Indonesia) Wahyu Nayaka (Indonesia) Ade Yusuf	13	16

=== Women's doubles ===
Finals
(Denmark) Christinna Pedersen (Denmark) Kamilla Rytter Juhl	21	21
(Indonesia) Ni Ketut Mahadewi Istirani (Indonesia) Anggia Shitta Awanda	10	8

=== Mixed doubles ===
Semifinals
1	(Denmark) Joachim Fischer (Denmark) Christinna Pedersen	21	21
4	(France) Ronan Labar (France) Émilie Lefel	16	11
3	(Indonesia) Ronald Alexander (Indonesia) Melati Daeva Oktaviani	14	14
2	(Denmark) Mads Pieler Kolding (Denmark) Kamilla Rytter Juhl	21	21

Finals
(Denmark) Joachim Fischer (Denmark) Christinna Pedersen	21	21
(Denmark) Mads Pieler Kolding (Denmark) Kamilla Rytter Juhl	19	18
