= 2007 Copenhagen Masters =

The 2007 Copenhagen Masters in badminton was the 15th edition of the Copenhagen Masters. It was held in Copenhagen, from December 27 to December 29, 2007.

Only three categories were played: men's singles, women's singles and men's doubles.

== Men's singles ==
=== Group 1 ===
Player	Pld	W	L	Pts
(Denmark) Peter Gade	2	2	0	2
(Malaysia) Kuan Beng Hong	2	1	1	1
(Poland) Przemyslaw Wacha	2	0	2	0

December 27, 2007
Peter Gade (Denmark)	21-17, 21–16	(Malaysia) Kuan Beng Hong
Kuan Beng Hong (Malaysia)	18-21, 21–11, 21–16	(Poland) Przemyslaw Wacha
December 28, 2007
Peter Gade (Denmark)	21-14, 21–8	(Poland) Przemyslaw Wacha

=== Group 2 ===
Player	Pld	W	L	Pts
(Denmark) Kenneth Jonassen	2	2	0	2
(Malaysia) Muhd Roslin Hashim	2	1	1	1
(Netherlands) Dicky Palyama	2	0	2	0

December 27, 2007
Kenneth Jonassen (Denmark)	21-11, 21–10	(Netherlands) Dicky Palyama
Muhd Roslin Hashim (Malaysia)	21-16, 21–16	(Netherlands) Dicky Palyama
December 28, 2007
Kenneth Jonassen (Denmark)	21-12, 21–12	(Malaysia) Muhd Roslin Hashim

=== Finals ===
Final
(Denmark) Peter Gade	21	23
(Denmark) Kenneth Jonassen	18	21

== Women's singles ==
=== Group 1 ===
Player	Pld	W	L	Pts
(Germany) Xu Huaiwen	1	1	0	1
(Bulgaria) Petya Nedelcheva	1	0	1	0

December 27, 2007
Xu Huaiwen (Germany)	21-5, 21-0 (retired)	(Bulgaria) Petya Nedelcheva

=== Group 2 ===
Player	Pld	W	L	Pts
(Denmark) Tine Rasmussen	1	1	0	1
(Hong Kong) Zhou Mi	1	0	1	0

December 27, 2007
Tine Rasmussen (Denmark)	7-21, 21–19, 21–17	(Hong Kong) Zhou Mi

=== Finals ===
Semifinals
1	(Germany) Xu Huaiwen	21	17	21
4	(Denmark) Tine Rasmussen	15	21	12
3	(Bulgaria) Petya Nedelcheva
2	(Hong Kong) Zhou Mi	wo

Finals
(Germany) Xu Huaiwen	21	19	15
(Hong Kong) Zhou Mi	11	21	9

^1 retired because of a knee injury

== Men's doubles ==
=== Group 1 ===
Player	Pld	W	L	Pts
(Denmark) Jens Eriksen (Denmark) M. Lundgaard Hansen	2	2	0	2
(Poland) Michal Logosz (Poland) Robert Mateusiak	2	1	1	1
(Germany) Ingo Kindervater (Germany) Kristof Hopp	2	0	2	0

December 27, 2007
Jens Eriksen (Denmark); M. Lundgaard Hansen (Denmark)	21-16, 21–15	(Germany) Ingo Kindervater (Germany) Kristof Hopp
December 28, 2007
Michal Logosz (Poland); Robert Mateusiak (Poland)	21-18, 21–18	(Germany) Ingo Kindervater (Germany) Kristof Hopp
Jens Eriksen (Denmark); M. Lundgaard Hansen (Denmark)	21-15, 21–19	(Poland) Michal Logosz (Poland) Robert Mateusiak

=== Group 2 ===
Player	Pld	W	L	Pts
(Malaysia) Abdul Latif (Malaysia) Mohd Tazari	2	2	0	2
(Denmark) Mathias Boe (Denmark) Carsten Mogensen	2	1	1	1
(Denmark) Jonas Rasmussen (Denmark) Lars Paaske	2	0	2	0

December 27, 2007
Abdul Latif (Malaysia); Mohd Tazari (Malaysia)	21-19, 21–15	(Denmark) Jonas Rasmussen (Denmark) Lars Paaske
December 28, 2007
Mathias Boe (Denmark); Carsten Mogensen (Denmark)	21-19, 21–17	(Denmark) Jonas Rasmussen (Denmark) Lars Paaske
Abdul Latif (Malaysia); Mohd Tazari (Malaysia)	18-21, 21–16, 21–18	(Denmark) Mathias Boe (Denmark) Carsten Mogensen

=== Finals ===
Final
(Denmark) Jens Eriksen (Denmark) M. Lundgaard Hansen	21	21
(Malaysia) Abdul Latif (Malaysia) Mohd Tazari	11	17
