= Copenhagen Masters =

Badminton tournament in Denmark

The Copenhagen Masters is a high-ranking tournament in badminton. It is an invitation tournament held annually since 1993 in the week between Christmas and New Year in Copenhagen. The Danish top players meet thereby the remaining world point leaders. The venue was in the first eleven years the Cirkusbyningen, an old circus. Since 2004 it takes place on timber flooring in the Falconer Centret. In 2016 and 2017, the tournament will not be held due to a renovation of the venue.

== Previous champions ==
Year	Men's singles	Women's singles	Men's doubles	Women's doubles	Mixed doubles
1993	(Denmark) Thomas Stuer-Lauridsen	(Denmark) Camilla Martin	(Denmark) Jon Holst-Christensen (Denmark) Thomas Lund	No competition	No competition
1994	(Indonesia) Heryanto Arbi	(South Korea) Bang Soo-hyun	(Denmark) Jon Holst-Christensen (2) (Denmark) Thomas Lund (2)	No competition	No competition
1995	(Sweden) Jens Olsson	(Denmark) Camilla Martin (2)	(Denmark) Henrik Svarrer (Denmark) Michael Søgaard	No competition	No competition
1996	(Denmark) Poul-Erik Høyer Larsen	(Denmark) Camilla Martin (3)	(Denmark) Jon Holst-Christensen (3) (Denmark) Thomas Lund (3)	No competition	No competition
1997	(China) Sun Jun	(Denmark) Camilla Martin (4)	(Indonesia) Candra Wijaya (Indonesia) Tony Gunawan	No competition	No competition
1998	(China) Sun Jun (2)	(China) Zhang Ning	(Denmark) Jens Eriksen (Denmark) Jesper Larsen	No competition	No competition
1999	(Denmark) Peter Gade	(Denmark) Camilla Martin (5)	(Malaysia) Choong Tan Fook (Malaysia) Lee Wan Wah	No competition	No competition
2000	(Denmark) Peter Gade (2)	(China) Gong Zhichao	(Indonesia) Flandy Limpele (Indonesia) Eng Hian	No competition	No competition
2001	(Denmark) Peter Gade (3)	(Denmark) Camilla Martin (6)	(Indonesia) Candra Wijaya (Indonesia) Sigit Budiarto	No competition	No competition
2002	(Denmark) Peter Gade (4)	(China) Zhang Ning (2)	(Indonesia) Candra Wijaya (2) (Indonesia) Sigit Budiarto (2)	No competition	No competition
2003	(Malaysia) Wong Choong Hann	(China) Xie Xingfang	(Indonesia) Candra Wijaya (3) (Indonesia) Halim Haryanto	No competition	No competition
2004	(Denmark) Peter Gade (5)	No competition	(Indonesia) Eng Hian (Indonesia) Flandy Limpele	No competition	(Denmark) Jens Eriksen (Denmark) Mette Schjoldager
2005	(Denmark) Peter Gade (6)	No competition	(United States) Tony Gunawan (United States) Howard Bach	No competition	(England) Nathan Robertson (England) Gail Emms
2006	(Denmark) Peter Gade (7)	No competition	(China) Fu Haifeng (China) Cai Yun	No competition	(Denmark) Thomas Laybourn (Denmark) Kamilla Rytter Juhl
2007	(Denmark) Peter Gade (8)	(Germany) Xu Huaiwen	(Denmark) Jens Eriksen (2) (Denmark) Martin Lundgaard Hansen	No competition	No competition
2008	(Denmark) Peter Gade (9)	(Denmark) Tine Rasmussen	(Denmark) Lars Paaske (Denmark) Jonas Rasmussen	No competition	No competition
2009	(Denmark) Jan Ø. Jørgensen	(Denmark) Tine Rasmussen (2)	(Denmark) Lars Paaske (2) (Denmark) Jonas Rasmussen (2)	No competition	(Denmark) Thomas Laybourn (2) (Denmark) Kamilla Rytter Juhl (2)
2010	(Denmark) Peter Gade (10)	(Thailand) Salakjit Ponsana	(Denmark) Mads Conrad-Petersen (Denmark) Jonas Rasmussen (3)	No competition	(Denmark) Joachim Fischer (Denmark) Christinna Pedersen
2011	(Denmark) Jan Ø. Jørgensen (2)	(Thailand) Ratchanok Intanon	(Denmark) Mathias Boe (Denmark) Carsten Mogensen	No competition	(Denmark) Joachim Fischer (2) (Denmark) Christinna Pedersen (2)
2012	(Denmark) Jan Ø. Jørgensen (3)	No competition	(Denmark) Mads Pieler Kolding (Denmark) Carsten Mogensen (2)	No competition	(Denmark) Joachim Fischer (3) (Denmark) Christinna Pedersen (3)
2013	(Denmark) Viktor Axelsen	No competition	(Denmark) Mathias Boe (2) (Denmark) Carsten Mogensen (3)	No competition	(Denmark) Joachim Fischer (4) (Denmark) Christinna Pedersen (4)
2014	(Denmark) Viktor Axelsen (2)	No competition	(Denmark) Mathias Boe (3) (Denmark) Carsten Mogensen (4)	(Denmark) Christinna Pedersen (Denmark) Kamilla Rytter Juhl	(Denmark) Joachim Fischer (5) (Denmark) Christinna Pedersen (5)
2015	(Denmark) Viktor Axelsen (3)	(Denmark) Line Kjærsfeldt	(Denmark) Mathias Boe (4) (Denmark) Carsten Mogensen (5)	(Denmark) Christinna Pedersen (2) (Denmark) Kamilla Rytter Juhl (2)	(Denmark) Joachim Fischer (6) (Denmark) Christinna Pedersen (6)
2016	Not held				
2017	Not held				
