= Peter Gade =

Danish badminton player (born 1976)

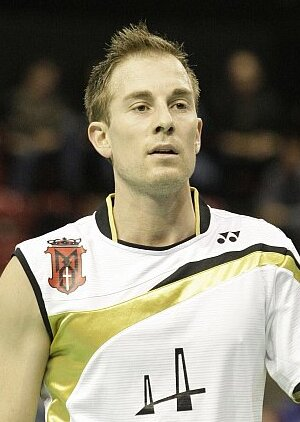
- Gade at the 2010 Swiss Open Super Series

Personal information
- Born: Peter Gade Christensen; 14 December 1976 (age 49) Aalborg, Denmark
- Height: 1.83 m (6 ft 0 in)
- Weight: 73 kg (161 lb)

Sport
- Country: Denmark
- Sport: Badminton
- Handedness: Right

Men's singles
- Career record: 517 Wins, 155 Losses
- Highest ranking: 1 (28 October 1997)
- BWF profile
Medal record
Men's badminton
Representing Denmark
World Championships
Silver medal – second place	2001 Seville	Men's singles
Bronze medal – third place	1999 Copenhagen	Men's singles
Bronze medal – third place	2005 Anaheim	Men's singles
Bronze medal – third place	2010 Paris	Men's singles
Bronze medal – third place	2011 London	Men's singles
Sudirman Cup
Silver medal – second place	1999 Copenhagen	Mixed team
Silver medal – second place	2011 Qingdao	Mixed team
Bronze medal – third place	2001 Seville	Mixed team
Bronze medal – third place	2003 Eindhoven	Mixed team
Bronze medal – third place	2005 Beijing	Mixed team
Thomas Cup
Silver medal – second place	2004 Jakarta	Men's team
Silver medal – second place	2006 Sendai & Tokyo	Men's team
Bronze medal – third place	1998 Hong Kong	Men's team
Bronze medal – third place	2000 Kuala Lumpur	Men's team
Bronze medal – third place	2012 Wuhan	Men's team
European Championships
Gold medal – first place	1998 Sofia	Men's singles
Gold medal – first place	2000 Glasgow	Men's singles
Gold medal – first place	2004 Geneva	Men's singles
Gold medal – first place	2006 Den Bosch	Men's singles
Gold medal – first place	2010 Manchester	Men's singles
European Mixed Team Championships
Gold medal – first place	1998 Sofia	Mixed team
Gold medal – first place	2000 Glasgow	Mixed team
Gold medal – first place	2004 Geneva	Mixed team
Gold medal – first place	2006 Den Bosch	Mixed team
Gold medal – first place	2009 Liverpool	Mixed team
European Men's Team Championships
Gold medal – first place	2006 Thessalonica	Men's team
Gold medal – first place	2008 Almere	Men's team
Gold medal – first place	2010 Warsaw	Men's team
World Junior Championships
Gold medal – first place	1994 Kuala Lumpur	Boys' doubles
European Junior Championships
Gold medal – first place	1995 Nitra	Boys' singles
Gold medal – first place	1995 Nitra	Boys' doubles
Gold medal – first place	1995 Nitra	Mixed team

Peter Høeg Gade (born 14 December 1976) is a Danish former professional badminton player. He currently resides in Holte, North of Copenhagen. He has two children with the former handball player Camilla Høeg.

Gade made his mark in badminton history through his All England Open Badminton Championships singles title in 1999 and his five European Championships crowns in the men's singles event. He topped the world rankings from 1998 to 2001. With his 22 Grand-Prix titles, he is one of the sport's most successful players. On 22 June 2006, he briefly recaptured the number one spot in the world rankings. This was achieved after winning the Singapore Open and reaching the quarter-final at the Malaysia Open.

With his defeat in the quarter-finals of the 2012 French Open, Gade retired from international competition.

== Player attributes ==
His playing style is known for fast attacks, footwork and constant pressure. His deception is particularly creative for a world badminton player, and he uses a widely recognised "trademark shot" (the so-called "double action" of the racket sends the shuttle to the back of the court, while aiming to bring the player towards the net). With a plethora of deceptive shots, he has been known to win points from more outrageous attempts, such as the reverse forehand and backhand (using the opposite side of the racket head to the one anticipated, to make contact with the shuttlecock at a radically different angle).

== Career highlights ==
=== International Tournament wins ===
Men's singles unless otherwise noted

- 1994—World-Junior-Champion in men's doubles (partner Peder Nissen)
- 1995—European-Junior-Championships
- 1996—Scottish Open
- 1997—German Open, Taiwan Open, Hong Kong Open
- 1998—Japan Open, Swiss Open, Danish Open, Malaysian Open, European Championships
- 1999—All England Open Badminton Championships, Ipoh Masters, Copenhagen Masters, Japan Open, World GrandPrix
- 2000—Korea Open, Danish Open, Taiwan Open, European Championships, Copenhagen Masters
- 2001—Copenhagen Masters, Korea Open
- 2002—European Championships, US Open, Copenhagen Masters
- 2004—European Championships, Copenhagen Masters
- 2005—Korea Open, Copenhagen Masters
- 2006—European Championships, Aviva Singapore Open, Copenhagen Masters
- 2007—Malaysian Open, Copenhagen Masters
- 2008—Denmark Open, French Open, Copenhagen Masters
- 2009—Korea Open
- 2010—European Championships, Copenhagen Masters

=== BWF Super Series ===
Legend
1	Winner
2	Runner-up
SF	Semi-finalist
QF	Quarter-finalist
R2	Last 16
R1	Last 32
Q	Qualification
DNP	Did not play

==== 2011 ====
Player	MAS	KOR	ENG	IND	SIN	INA	CHN	JPN	DEN	FRA	CHN	HKG	SSMF	Points
(Denmark) Peter Gade	DNP	QF	QF	(2) Lost to Lee Chong Wei 12–21 21–15 15–21	SF	SF	SF	SF	SF		QF	QF	SF	

2011 BWF Super Series – Men's Singles Standings

==== 2010 ====
Player	MAS (Jan)	KOR (Jan)	ENG (Mar)	SUI (Mar)	SIN (May)	INA (Jun)	CHN (Sept)	JPN (Sept)	DEN (Oct)	FRA (Nov)	CHN (Dec)	HKG (Dec)	Points
(Denmark) Peter Gade	(SF) Lost to Boonsak Ponsana 21–11 12–21 16–21	(2) Lost to Lee Chong Wei 12–21 11–21	(SF) Went down 17–21 14–21 against Lee Chong Wei	(SF) Went down 20–22 17–21 against Chen Long	(SF) Lost to Boonsak Ponsana 22–20 17–21 16–21	DNP	DNP	(SF) Went down 11–21 19–21 against Lin dan	Walkover in the first round	(SF) Lost to Joachim Persson 14–21 21–16 17–21	DNP	DNP (WITHDRAW)	

2010 BWF Super Series – Men's Singles Standings

==== 2009 ====
Player	MAS	KOR	ENG	SUI	SIN	INA	CHN	JPN	DEN	FRA	CHN	HKG	Points
(Denmark) Peter Gade	SF	1	QF						QF	SF	2	2	15,620

2009 BWF Super Series – Men's Singles Standings

==== 2008 ====
Player	MAS	KOR	ENG	SUI	SIN	INA	CHN	JPN	DEN	FRA	CHN	HKG	Points
(Denmark) Peter Gade	DNP	SF	DNP	DNP	SF	R2	DNP	R1	1	1	R2	R2	45,240

2008 BWF Super Series – Men's Singles Standings

==== 2007 ====
Player	MAS	KOR	ENG	SUI	SIN	INA	CHN	JPN	DEN	FRA	CHN	HKG	Points
(Denmark) Peter Gade	1	DNP	R1	SF	SF	QF	R2	QF	R2	QF	QF	QF	54,440

2007 BWF Super Series – Men's Singles Standings

=== Olympics ===
Gade represented Denmark in badminton singles in four Summer Olympics (2000, 2004, 2008 and 2012).

2000

He reached the semifinals in the 2000 Summer Olympics, where he lost to eventual gold medalist Ji Xinpeng of China. In the bronze medal match, he lost to another Chinese player, Xia Xuanze.

2004

At the 2004 Summer Olympics in men's singles, he defeated Chien Yu-Hsiu of Chinese Taipei and Nikhil Kanetkar of India in the first two rounds. However, in the quarter-finals, Gade was defeated by the eventual champion, Taufik Hidayat of Indonesia 15–12, 15–12.

2008

Gade stated that one of his final career goals would be a gold medal at the 2008 Summer Olympics in Beijing. In an interview, he indicated that it might be one of his final big tournaments although not ruling out the possibility of continuing his career after the games. He was planning to retire after the Beijing Olympics and begin coaching badminton. Gade won his first match in the 2008 Beijing Olympics in round two after defeating Nabil Lasmari 21–6, 21–4. In the third round Gade faced Shoji Sato. Gade was nearly beaten after losing the first set 21–19 and Shoji Sato having 2 match points in the second with the score at 18–20. However, Gade won the set 22–20 and went on to win the third set 21–15. Gade lost in straight sets to the Chinese champion Lin Dan in the quarter-final.

2012

In the 2012 Summer Olympics he was defeated by Chen Long of China in the quarter-finals.

=== Other ===
- Danish National Champion: 2000, 2001, 2002, 2004, 2005, 2006, 2007, 2009, 2010, 2011

=== Retirement ===
Gade beat two-time Olympic Champion Lin Dan in a farewell exhibition match at the Copenhagen Masters on 27 December 2012 in front of a sold-out crowd at Falconer Salen.

== Achievements ==
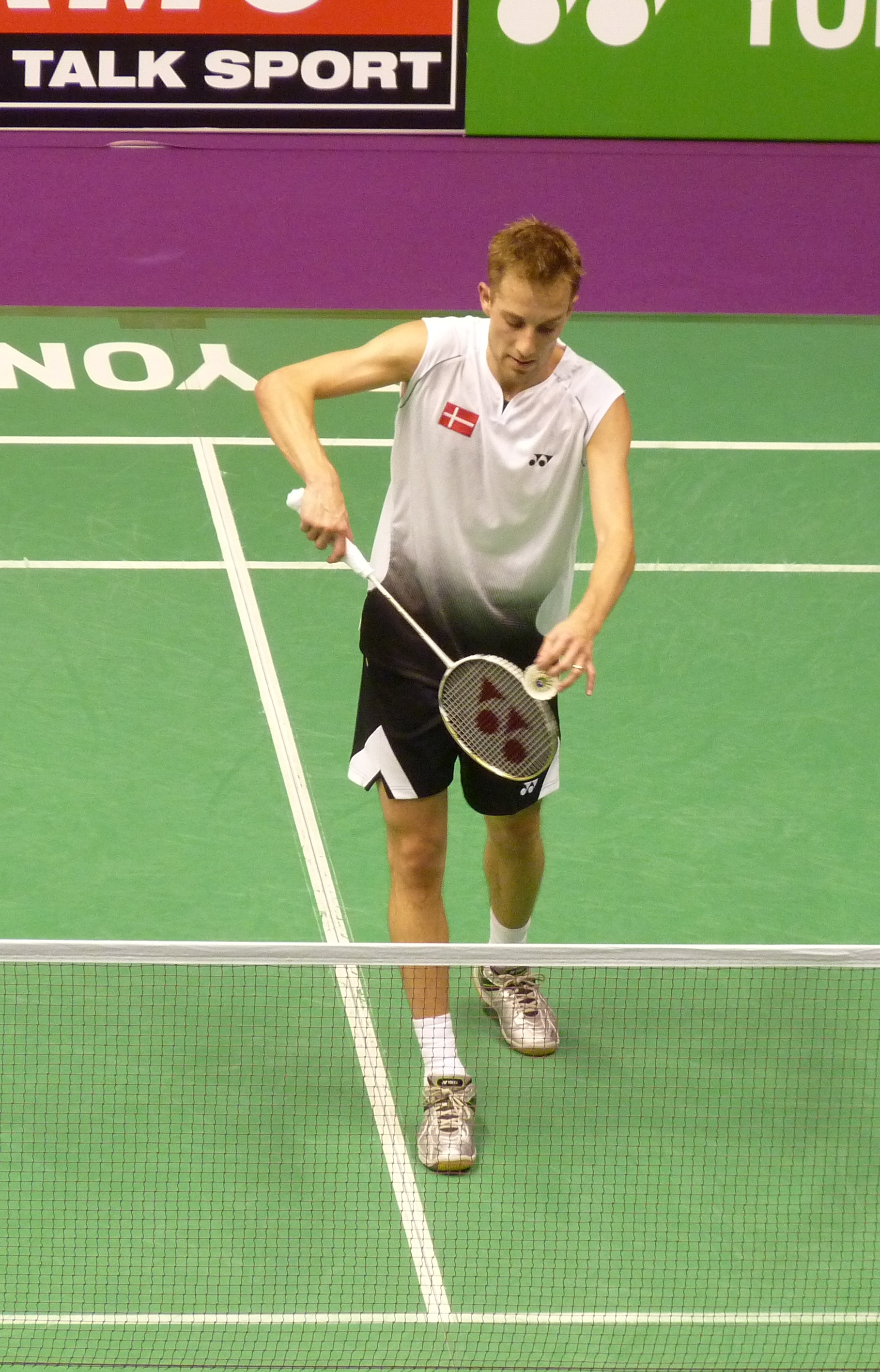
Peter Gade at 2010 BWF World Championships

=== BWF World Championships ===
Men's singles
Year	Venue	Opponent	Score	Result
2011	Wembley Arena, London, England	(China) Lin Dan	24–22, 7–21, 15–21	Bronze
2010	Stade Pierre de Coubertin, Paris, France	(China) Chen Jin	21–19, 8–21, 11–21	Bronze
2005	Arrowhead Pond, Anaheim, United States	(China) Lin Dan	9–15, 15–13, 11–15	Bronze
2001	Palacio de Deportes de San Pablo, Seville, Spain	(Indonesia) Hendrawan	6–15, 16–17	Silver
1999	Brøndby Arena, Copenhagen, Denmark	(Chinese Taipei) Fung Permadi	11–15, 15–1, 14–15	Bronze

=== European Championships ===
Men's singles
Year	Venue	Opponent	Score	Result
2010	Manchester Evening News Arena, Manchester, England	(Denmark) Jan Ø. Jørgensen	21–14, 21–11	Gold
2006	Maaspoort Sports and Events, Den Bosch, Netherlands	(Denmark) Kenneth Jonassen	21–19, 21–18	Gold
2004	Queue d’Arve Sport Center, Geneva, Switzerland	(Denmark) Kenneth Jonassen	15–9, 15–10	Gold
2000	Kelvin Hall, Glasgow, Scotland	(Denmark) Poul-Erik Høyer Larsen	15–5, 15–11	Gold
1998	Winter Sports Palace, Sofia, Bulgaria	(Denmark) Kenneth Jonassen	15–8, 15–4	Gold

=== World Junior Championships ===
Boys' doubles
Year	Venue	Partner	Opponent	Score	Result
1994	Kuala Lumpur Badminton Stadium; Kuala Lumpur, Malaysia	(Denmark) Peder Nissen	(Indonesia) Eng Hian (Indonesia) Andreas	15–10, 15–11	Gold

=== European Junior Championships ===
Boys' singles
Year	Venue	Opponent	Score	Result
1995	Nitra, Slovakia	(England) Mark Constable	15–9, 12–15, 15–8	Gold

Boys' doubles
Year	Venue	Partner	Opponent	Score	Result
1995	Nitra, Slovakia	(Denmark) Peder Nissen	(Denmark) Jonas Rasmussen (Denmark) Søren Hansen	15–6, 15–6	Gold

=== BWF Superseries (4 titles, 6 runners-up) ===
The BWF Superseries, launched on 14 December 2006 and implemented in 2007, is a series of elite badminton tournaments, sanctioned by the Badminton World Federation (BWF). BWF Superseries has two levels: Superseries and Superseries Premier. A season of Superseries features twelve tournaments around the world, introduced in 2011, with successful players invited to the Superseries Finals held at the year's end.

Men's singles
Year	Tournament	Opponent	Score	Result
2011	Indonesia Open	(Malaysia) Lee Chong Wei	11–21, 7–21	(silver) Runner-up
2011	India Open	(Malaysia) Lee Chong Wei	12–21, 21–12, 15–21	(silver) Runner-up
2010	Superseries Finals	(Malaysia) Lee Chong Wei	9–21, 14–21	(silver) Runner-up
2010	Korea Open	(Malaysia) Lee Chong Wei	12–21, 11–21	(silver) Runner-up
2009	Hong Kong Open	(Malaysia) Lee Chong Wei	13–21, 21–13, 16–21	(silver) Runner-up
2009	Korea Open	(Malaysia) Lee Chong Wei	21–18, 10–21, 21–17	(gold) Winner
2008	Superseries Finals	(Malaysia) Lee Chong Wei	8–21, 16–21	(silver) Runner-up
2008	French Open	(Indonesia) Taufik Hidayat	16–21, 21–17, 21–7	(gold) Winner
2008	Denmark Open	(Denmark) Joachim Persson	21–18, 17–21, 21–14	(gold) Winner
2007	Malaysia Open	(China) Bao Chunlai	21–15, 17–21, 21–14	(gold) Winner

BWF Super Series Finals tournament
BWF Super Series Premier tournament
BWF Super Series tournament

=== IBF Grand Prix (17 titles, 8 runners-up) ===
The World Badminton Grand Prix sanctioned by International Badminton Federation since 1983.

Men's singles
Year	Tournament	Opponent	Score	Result
2006	Singapore Open	(Denmark) Kenneth Jonassen	21–10, 21–14	(gold) Winner
2006	China Masters	(China) Chen Jin	19–21, 14–21	(silver) Runner-up
2005	Swiss Open	(Malaysia) Muhammad Hafiz Hashim	14–17, 10–15	(silver) Runner-up
2005	Korea Open	(Denmark) Kenneth Jonassen	7–15, 15–4, 15–5	(gold) Winner
2004	All England Open	(China) Lin Dan	15–9, 5–15, 8–15	(silver) Runner-up
2002	U.S. Open	(Denmark) Peter Rasmussen	17–14, 15–17, 15–1	(gold) Winner
2001	Korea Open	(China) Xiao Hui	15–7, 15–6	(gold) Winner
2000	Denmark Open	(Sweden) George Rimarcdi	15–11, 15–12	(gold) Winner
2000	Chinese Taipei Open	(Malaysia) Wong Choong Hann	15–9, 15–5	(gold) Winner
2000	Korea Open	(Malaysia) Rashid Sidek	15–3, 15–11	(gold) Winner
1999	Grand Prix Finals	(Indonesia) Marleve Mainaky	15–11, 15–3	(gold) Winner
1999	Japan Open	(China) Sun Jun	15–3, 15–10	(gold) Winner
1999	All England Open	(Indonesia) Taufik Hidayat	15–11, 7–15, 15–10	(gold) Winner
1998	Grand Prix Finals	(China) Sun Jun	11–15, 8–15	(silver) Runner-up
1998	Denmark Open	(China) Dong Jiong	15–8, 17–14	(gold) Winner
1998	Singapore Open	(Indonesia) Hendrawan	10–15, 8–15	(silver) Runner-up
1998	Malaysia Open	(Indonesia) Jeffer Rosobin	15–5, 15–12	(gold) Winner
1998	Swiss Open	(China) Sun Jun	15–12, 8–15, 15–11	(gold) Winner
1998	Japan Open	(China) Luo Yigang	15–3, 15–11	(gold) Winner
1997	Hong Kong Open	(Denmark) Thomas Stuer-Lauridsen	7–15, 15–6, 15–4	(gold) Winner
1997	Denmark Open	(China) Dong Jiong	17–15, 11–15, 12–15	(silver) Runner-up
1997	German Open	(Denmark) Poul-Erik Høyer Larsen	12–15, 15–12, 15–12	(gold) Winner
1997	U.S. Open	(Denmark) Poul-Erik Høyer Larsen	6–15, 15–7, 2–15	(silver) Runner-up
1997	Malaysia Open	(Indonesia) Hermawan Susanto	11–15, 11–15	(silver) Runner-up
1997	Chinese Taipei Open	(Denmark) Poul-Erik Høyer Larsen	15–10, 18–15	(gold) Winner

=== IBF International (1 title) ===
Men's singles
Year	Tournament	Opponent	Score	Result
1996	Scottish Open	(China) Ji Xinpeng	15–8, 15–10	(gold) Winner

== Equipment ==
=== Rackets ===
- Yonex Voltric 80 PG (2012 Copenhagen Masters)
- Yonex Voltric Z-FORCE (2012 limited use)
- Yonex Voltric 80 (2011–2012)
- Yonex Arcsaber 10 PG (2010–2011)
- Yonex Arcsaber 10 (2008–2010)
- Yonex Armortec 700 new colour (2006–2008)
- Yonex Armortec 700 (2005–2006)
- Yonex Muscle Power 88 red (2004–2005)
- Yonex Muscle Power 77* (2001 limited use)
- Yonex Titanium 10 (1999 limited use)
- Yonex Isometric Slim 10 (1997–2004)
- Yonex Isometric 300 ( – 1997)

- bg 80 string

== Honors ==
- Special Award of the DBF 2006.
- IBF World Badminton Player of the year 1998
