= BWF World Tour Finals =

Season ending badminton championships

- Official website
- Founded: 2018; 8 years ago
- Editions: 9 (2026)
- Location: Hangzhou (2026); China
- Venue: Hangzhou Olympic Sports Expo Center (2025)
- Prize money: US$3,000,000 (2025)

Men's
- Draw: 8S / 8D
- Most singles titles: 3, Viktor Axelsen
- Most doubles titles: 2 Liu Yuchen; Seo Seung-jae

Women's
- Draw: 8S / 8D
- Most singles titles: 2 Tai Tzu-ying; An Se-young
- Most doubles titles: 3 Chen Qingchen; Jia Yifan; Lee So-hee

Mixed doubles
- Draw: 8
- Most titles (male): 4, Zheng Siwei
- Most titles (female): 4, Huang Yaqiong

Last completed
- 2025 BWF World Tour Finals

The BWF World Tour Finals, officially HSBC BWF World Tour Finals, which succeeds BWF Super Series Finals, is an annual season finale badminton tournament which is held every December of a year where the players with the most points from that calendar year's events of the BWF World Tour compete for total prize money of at least US$ 2,500,000.

== Features ==
=== Prize money ===
The tournament offers total prize money of US$3,000,000. The prize money is distributed via the following formula:

$Total\ prize\ money\ \times \frac{Percentage}{100}$

The prize money distribution (as of 2025 editions) are:

Round	Men's singles	Women's singles	Men's doubles	Women's doubles	Mixed doubles
Winner	US$240,000	US$240,000	US$252,000	US$252,000	US$252,000
Runner-up	US$120,000	US$120,000	US$120,000	US$120,000	US$120,000
Semi-finalist	US$60,000	US$60,000	US$60,000	US$60,000	US$60,000
3rd in Group	US$33,000	US$33,000	US$39,000	US$39,000	US$39,000
4th in Group	US$18,000	US$18,000	US$21,000	US$21,000	US$21,000

=== World ranking points ===
Below is the point distribution table for each phase of the tournament based on the BWF points system for the BWF World Tour Finals event.

Winner(s)	Runner(s)-up	Semi-finalists	3rd in group	4th in group
14,000	12,000	10,000	8,900	7,800

=== Eligibility ===
At the end of the BWF World Tour circuit, top eight players/pairs in the BWF World Tour standing of each discipline, with the maximum of two players/pairs from the same member association, are required to play in a final tournament known as the BWF World Tour Finals.

Only the top 14 results from the BWF World Tour tournaments during the year and a maximum of 3 results from Super 100 will count towards the ranking for BWF World Tour Final

If two or more players are tied in ranking, the selection of players will based on the following criteria:

- The players who participated in the most BWF World Tour tournaments;
- The players who collected the most points in BWF World Tour tournaments starting on 1 July that year.

== Results ==
Year	Host city	Men's singles	Women's singles	Men's doubles	Women's doubles	Mixed doubles	Ref
2018	Guangzhou	(China) Shi Yuqi	(India) P. V. Sindhu	(China) Li Junhui (China) Liu Yuchen	(Japan) Misaki Matsutomo (Japan) Ayaka Takahashi	(China) Wang Yilyu (China) Huang Dongping	
2019	Guangzhou	(Japan) Kento Momota	(China) Chen Yufei	(Indonesia) Mohammad Ahsan (Indonesia) Hendra Setiawan	(China) Chen Qingchen (China) Jia Yifan	(China) Zheng Siwei (China) Huang Yaqiong	
2020	Bangkok (Note: This tournament, originally due to be held for the third year in a row at the Tianhe Gymnasium in Guangzhou, China, was relocated due to the COVID-19 pandemic in China.)	(Denmark) Anders Antonsen	(Chinese Taipei) Tai Tzu-ying	(Chinese Taipei) Lee Yang (Chinese Taipei) Wang Chi-lin	(South Korea) Lee So-hee (South Korea) Shin Seung-chan	(Thailand) Dechapol Puavaranukroh (Thailand) Sapsiree Taerattanachai	
2021	Bali (Note: This tournament, originally due to be held for the fourth year in a row at the Tianhe Gymnasium in Guangzhou, China, was relocated due to the COVID-19 pandemic in China.)	(Denmark) Viktor Axelsen	(South Korea) An Se-young	(Japan) Takuro Hoki (Japan) Yugo Kobayashi	(South Korea) Kim So-yeong (South Korea) Kong Hee-yong	(Thailand) Dechapol Puavaranukroh (Thailand) Sapsiree Taerattanachai	
2022	Bangkok (Note: This tournament, originally due to be held for the fifth year in a row at the Tianhe Gymnasium in Guangzhou, was later relocated due to the COVID-19 pandemic in China.)	(Denmark) Viktor Axelsen	(Japan) Akane Yamaguchi	(China) Liu Yuchen (China) Ou Xuanyi	(China) Chen Qingchen (China) Jia Yifan	(China) Zheng Siwei (China) Huang Yaqiong	
2023	Hangzhou	(Denmark) Viktor Axelsen	(Chinese Taipei) Tai Tzu-ying	(South Korea) Kang Min-hyuk (South Korea) Seo Seung-jae	(China) Chen Qingchen (China) Jia Yifan	(China) Zheng Siwei (China) Huang Yaqiong	
2024	Hangzhou	(China) Shi Yuqi	(China) Wang Zhiyi	(Denmark) Kim Astrup (Denmark) Anders Skaarup Rasmussen	(South Korea) Baek Ha-na (South Korea) Lee So-hee	(China) Zheng Siwei (China) Huang Yaqiong	
2025	Hangzhou	(France) Christo Popov	(South Korea) An Se-young	(South Korea) Kim Won-ho (South Korea) Seo Seung-jae	(South Korea) Baek Ha-na (South Korea) Lee So-hee	(China) Feng Yanzhe (China) Huang Dongping	
2026	Hangzhou						

== Performance by nations ==
As of the 2025 edition

No	Nation	MS	WS	MD	WD	XD	Total
1	China	2	2	2	3	6	15
2	South Korea		2	2	4		8
3	Denmark	4		1			5
4	Japan	1	1	1	1		4
5	Chinese Taipei		2	1			3
6	Thailand					2	2
7	France	1					1
7	India		1				1
7	Indonesia			1			1
Total		8	8	8	8	8	40

== Records and statistics ==
As of the 2025 edition

=== Most titles ===
Only players who have won at least two BWF World Tour Finals titles are listed. In doubles events, titles are counted individually for each player.

==== Overall ====
Rank	Player	Event	Titles	Years
1	(China) Huang Yaqiong	Mixed doubles	4	2019, 2022, 2023, 2024
1	(China) Zheng Siwei	Mixed doubles	4	2019, 2022, 2023, 2024
3	(China) Chen Qingchen	Women's doubles	3	2019, 2022, 2023
3	(China) Jia Yifan	Women's doubles	3	2019, 2022, 2023
3	(Denmark) Viktor Axelsen	Men's singles	3	2021, 2022, 2023
3	(South Korea) Lee So-hee	Women's doubles	3	2020, 2024, 2025
7	(China) Huang Dongping	Mixed doubles	2	2018, 2025
7	(China) Liu Yuchen	Men's doubles	2	2018, 2022
7	(China) Shi Yuqi	Men's singles	2	2018, 2024
7	(Chinese Taipei) Tai Tzu-ying	Women's singles	2	2020, 2023
7	(South Korea) An Se-young	Women's singles	2	2021, 2025
7	(South Korea) Baek Ha-na	Women's doubles	2	2024, 2025
7	(South Korea) Seo Seung-jae	Men's doubles	2	2023, 2025
7	(Thailand) Dechapol Puavaranukroh	Mixed doubles	2	2020, 2021
7	(Thailand) Sapsiree Taerattanachai	Mixed doubles	2	2020, 2021

==== Men's singles ====
Rank	Player	Titles	Years
1	(Denmark) Viktor Axelsen	3	2021, 2022, 2023
2	(China) Shi Yuqi	2	2018, 2024

==== Women's singles ====
Rank	Player	Titles	Years
1	(Chinese Taipei) Tai Tzu-ying	2	2020, 2023
1	(South Korea) An Se-young	2	2021, 2025

==== Men's doubles ====
Rank	Player	Titles	Years
1	(China) Liu Yuchen	2	2018, 2022
1	(South Korea) Seo Seung-jae	2	2023, 2025

==== Women's doubles ====
Rank	Player	Titles	Years
1	(China) Chen Qingchen	3	2019, 2022, 2023
1	(China) Jia Yifan	3	2019, 2022, 2023
1	(South Korea) Lee So-hee	3	2020, 2024, 2025
4	(South Korea) Baek Ha-na	2	2024, 2025

==== Mixed doubles ====
Rank	Player	Titles	Years
1	(China) Huang Yaqiong	4	2019, 2022, 2023, 2024
1	(China) Zheng Siwei	4	2019, 2022, 2023, 2024
3	(China) Huang Dongping	2	2018, 2025
3	(Thailand) Dechapol Puavaranukroh	2	2020, 2021
3	(Thailand) Sapsiree Taerattanachai	2	2020, 2021

=== Consecutive titles ===
Only players or pairs who have won titles in at least two consecutive editions are listed.

Rank	Player(s)	Event	Consecutive titles	Years
1	(China) Zheng Siwei / Huang Yaqiong	Mixed doubles	3	2022–2024
1	(Denmark) Viktor Axelsen	Men's singles	3	2021–2023
3	(China) Chen Qingchen / Jia Yifan	Women's doubles	2	2022–2023
3	(South Korea) Baek Ha-na / Lee So-hee	Women's doubles	2	2024–2025
3	(Thailand) Dechapol Puavaranukroh / Sapsiree Taerattanachai	Mixed doubles	2	2020–2021

=== Youngest champions ===
The five youngest players to win a BWF World Tour Finals title are listed. Ages are calculated as of the date of the final. In doubles events, players are counted individually.

Rank	Player	Event	Age	Edition
1	(South Korea) An Se-young	Women's singles	19 years, 303 days	2021
2	(China) Chen Yufei	Women's singles	21 years, 289 days	2019
3	(China) Jia Yifan	Women's doubles	22 years, 169 days	2019
4	(China) Chen Qingchen	Women's doubles	22 years, 175 days	2019
5	(China) Shi Yuqi	Men's singles	22 years, 291 days	2018

=== Oldest champions ===
The five oldest players to win a BWF World Tour Finals title are listed. Ages are calculated as of the date of the final. In doubles events, players are counted individually.

Rank	Player	Event	Age	Edition
1	(Denmark) Anders Skaarup Rasmussen	Men's doubles	35 years, 304 days	2024
2	(Indonesia) Hendra Setiawan	Men's doubles	35 years, 112 days	2019
3	(Denmark) Kim Astrup	Men's doubles	32 years, 284 days	2024
4	(Indonesia) Mohammad Ahsan	Men's doubles	32 years, 99 days	2019
5	(South Korea) Lee So-hee	Women's doubles	31 years, 190 days	2025

=== Most finals ===
Only players who have reached at least three BWF World Tour Finals finals are listed. In doubles events, final appearances are counted individually for each player.

Rank	Player	Event	Finals	Titles	Runners-up	Years
1	(China) Huang Yaqiong	Mixed doubles	5	4	1	2018, 2019, 2022, 2023, 2024
1	(China) Zheng Siwei	Mixed doubles	5	4	1	2018, 2019, 2022, 2023, 2024
1	(South Korea) Lee So-hee	Women's doubles	5	3	2	2018, 2020, 2023, 2024, 2025
4	(China) Huang Dongping	Mixed doubles	4	2	2	2018, 2019, 2023, 2025
4	(China) Shi Yuqi	Men's singles	4	2	2	2018, 2023, 2024, 2025
4	(Chinese Taipei) Tai Tzu-ying	Women's singles	4	2	2	2019, 2020, 2022, 2023
4	(Denmark) Viktor Axelsen	Men's singles	4	3	1	2020, 2021, 2022, 2023
8	(China) Chen Qingchen	Women's doubles	3	3	0	2019, 2022, 2023
8	(China) Jia Yifan	Women's doubles	3	3	0	2019, 2022, 2023
8	(Indonesia) Hendra Setiawan	Men's doubles	3	1	2	2019, 2020, 2022
8	(Indonesia) Mohammad Ahsan	Men's doubles	3	1	2	2019, 2020, 2022
8	(Japan) Yuta Watanabe	Men's doubles / Mixed doubles	3	0	3	2018, 2019, 2021
8	(South Korea) Baek Ha-na	Women's doubles	3	2	1	2023, 2024, 2025
8	(South Korea) Seo Seung-jae	Men's doubles / Mixed doubles	3	2	1	2020, 2023, 2025
8	(Thailand) Dechapol Puavaranukroh	Mixed doubles	3	2	1	2020, 2021, 2022
8	(Thailand) Sapsiree Taerattanachai	Mixed doubles	3	2	1	2020, 2021, 2022

== See also ==
- BWF Super Series Finals
- World Badminton Grand Prix Finals
