= Doli Armaano Ki =

Indian television series (2013–2015)

- Genre: Indian soap opera; Drama
- Created by: Spellbound Productions
- Written by: Pearl Grey; Shanti Bhushan
- Directed by: Sandeep Vijay; Niraj Pandey; Inder Das; Gurpreet Rana
- Starring: See below
- Country of origin: India
- Original language: Hindi
- No. of episodes: 482

Production
- Producers: Pearl Grey; Rajeev Singh
- Production locations: Jhansi; Mumbai
- Running time: 22 minutes
- Production companies: Spellbound Productions; Ideaz Pictures Pvt Ltd

Original release
- Network: Zee TV
- Release: December 2, 2013 – September 25, 2015

Doli Armaanon Ki (transl. Palanquin of Dreams) is an Indian television drama series which premiered on 2 December 2013, and ran until 25 September 2015. It aired on Zee TV. It stars Neha Marda and Mohit Malik as Urmi and Samrat Singh Rathore in the lead roles. Initially Mohit Malik rejected the role then Rahil Azam was signed for the show but was eventually replaced by Mohit Malik.

== Plot ==
Urmi Singh, a girl in Jhansi, dreams of marrying the "perfect man", who might be her "prince charming". Her marriage is arranged, with a wealthy businessman, Samrat Singh Rathore, who is selfish, arrogant and short-tempered, unbeknownst to Urmi as she was told by Samrat's best friend, Ishaan Sinha that he is a gentleman. During the wedding preparations, Urmi's cousin, Trisha, sees many red flags in Samrat, but Urmi ignores her and marries Samrat.

On their wedding night, Samrat shows his true colours and Urmi is devastated. He begins abusing Urmi, as no one in Samrat's family is willing to stand up to him for her, because even they fear his temper. His father, Rudra Singh Rathore and his brother, Diwakar try to help Urmi, but he ignores them and loses his temper. Ishaan discovers he is deceiving Urmi by abusing and cheating on her, so he breaks ties with Urmi and flees abroad. Urmi leaves Samrat's house on the day of Holi and returns to her parents' house but soon returns after finding out that she is pregnant with Samrat's child.

=== 4 years later ===
Urmi and Samrat have a son, Shaurya. On Shaurya's birthday, Urmi has an argument, with an old man and is surprised to know that he is Samrat's uncle. He helps Urmi to stand up for herself, but it angers Samrat. Samrat beats up Urmi badly. Urmi files a case against Samrat accusing domestic violence, but retracts it, due to her and his family's pressure. With advice from his uncle, Samrat begins changing his rude and disgusting behaviour, with love towards Urmi, only for it to later, be revealed that he was faking it just so she can stay with him. Urmi falls for Samrat's tricks and decides to forgive him one more time. But a well later, she finds him cheating on her and that, becomes the last straw for her. She leaves the house, with Shaurya. Samrat begins to make Urmi's life hell, and even begins manipulating Shaurya just so she can return, but this time Urmi stays firm. Ishaan returns to India and helps Urmi to get a divorce. Samrat is sentenced to 6 years in prison for domestic violence.

=== 6 years later ===
Urmi owns a restaurant, with Ishaan's help. Ishaan proposes to Urmi. Samrat returns to take revenge on Urmi and Ishaan. He marries Ishaan's sister, Taani to get closer to them. Urmi is revealed to be pregnant. Samrat tries to kill her, but Ishaan dies while saving Samrat. Overcome by guilt, Samrat kills himself. Ishaan's mother, Damini wrongfully blames Urmi for Ishaan's death.

=== 20 years later ===
Urmi's children, Shaurya and Ishaani are grown up. Manipulated by Damini, Ishaani hates Urmi believing she had killed Ishaan. Shaurya falls in love with Diya and they marry. Ishaani realizes Damini's reality and reconciles with Urmi. Damini is imprisoned. She returns and tries to kill the entire family, but Urmi shoots Damini and the family is reunited.

== Cast ==
=== Main ===
- Neha Marda / Manasi Salvi as Urmi Singh Sinha: Saroj and Devi's elder daughter; Gaurav and Anushka's sister; Samrat's ex-wife; Ishaan's widow; Shaurya and Ishaani's mother (2013–2015) / (2015)
- Mohit Malik as Samrat Singh Rathore: Shashikala and Rudra's younger son; Diwakar and Aditi's brother; Sanaya's ex-boyfriend; Urmi's ex-husband; Taani's husband; Shaurya's father (2013–2015) (Dead)
- Siddharth Arora / Vibhav Roy as Ishaan Sinha: Anirudh and Damini's son; Taani and Rati's brother; Rohit and Niharika's half-brother; Urmi's second husband; Ishaani's father; Shaurya's stepfather (2013–2014) / (2014–2015) (Dead)
- Kunal Karan Kapoor as Shaurya Sinha: Urmi and Samrat's son; Ishaan's stepson; Ishaani's half-brother; Diya's husband (2015)
  - Yash Pandey as Teenage Shaurya (2015)
  - Mitansh Gera as Child Shaurya (2014)
- Neha Sargam as Diya Tiwari Sinha: Mr. Tiwari's daughter; Shaurya's wife (2015)

=== Recurring ===
- Parvati Sehgal as Taani Sinha Singh Rathore: Anirudh and Damini's elder daughter; Ishaan and Ratti's sister; Rohit and Niharika's half-sister; Samrat's widow (2015)
- Geeta Tyagi as Shashikala Singh Rathore: Rudra's widow; Diwakar, Samrat and Aditi's mother; Mandira and Shaurya's grandmother (2013-2015)
- Jitendra Trehan as Rudra Singh Rathore: Garjan's brother; Shashikala's husband; Diwakar, Samrat and Aditi's father; Mandira and Shaurya's grandfather (2013–2014)
- Gaurav Rana as Diwakar Singh Rathore: Shashikala and Rudra's elder son; Samrat and Aditi's brother; Kanchan's husband; Mandira's father (2013–2015)
- Vibhuti Thakur as Kanchan Singh Rathore: Diwakar's wife; Mandira's mother (2013–2015)
- Sachi Tiwari as Mandira Singh Rathore: Diwakar and Kanchan's daughter (2014)
- Shruti Kanwar as Radha: Kanchan's cousin (2014)
- Ragini Gakhar as Aditi Singh Rathore Chauhan: Shashikala and Rudra's daughter; Diwakar and Samrat's sister; Amrit's wife (2013–2014)
- Aadesh Chaudhary / Harsh Vashisht as Amrit Singh Chauhan: Aditi's husband (2013–2014) / (2014)
- Anupam Shyam as Garjan Singh Rathore: Rudra's brother (2014)
- Manisha Thakkar as Rashmi Singh Rathore: Gaurav's ex-wife (2013-2014)
- Nalini Negi as Ishaani Sinha: Urmi and Ishaan's daughter; Shaurya's half-sister (2015)
- Sonia Kapoor as Anita Sinha: Anirudh's late wife; Rohit and Niharika's mother; Arjun and Niyati's grandmother (2015)
- Avinash Wadhawan as Anirudh Sinha: Anita's widower; Damini's husband; Rohit, Niharika, Ishaan, Taani and Ratti's father; Arjun, Niyati and Ishaani's grandfather; Shaurya's step-grandfather (2015)
- Kamya Panjabi as Damini Sinha: Anirudh's wife; Ishaan, Taani and Ratti's mother; Rohit and Niharika's stepmother; Ishaani's grandmother; Arjun, Niyati and Shaurya's step-grandmother (2015)
- Rajat Tokas / Amit Pachori as Rohit Sinha: Anirudh and Anita's son; Damini's stepson; Niharika's brother; Ishaan, Taani and Ratti's half-brother; Pooja's husband; Arjun and Niyati's father (2015)
- Falaq Naaz as Pooja Sinha: Rohit's wife; Arjun and Niyati's mother (2015)
- Gulfisha Mirza as Niharika Sinha Garg: Anirudh and Anita's daughter; Damini's step-daughter; Rohit's sister; Ishaan, Taani and Ratti's half-sister; Abhishek's wife (2015)
- Karan Suchak as Abhishek Garg: Niharika's husband (2015)
- Rohit Khurana as Arjun Sinha: Rohit and Pooja's son; Niyati's brother; Amrita's husband (2015)
- Deblina Chatterjee as Amrita Sinha: Arjun's wife (2015)
- Shilpa Raizada as Niyati Sinha: Rohit and Pooja's daughter; Arjun's sister (2015)
- Ayesha Singh as Ratti Sinha: Anirudh and Damini's younger daughter; Ishaan and Taani's sister; Rohit and Niharika's half-sister (2015)
- Amita Udgata as Gayatri Singh: Devi's mother; Gaurav, Urmi and Anushka's grandmother; Shaurya, Chiku and Ishaani's great-grandmother (2013-2015)
- Anjali Mukhi as Saroj Singh: Nirmala's sister; Devi's wife; Gaurav, Urmi and Anushka's mother; Shaurya, Chiku and Ishaani's grandmother (2013-2015)
- Jayant Rawal as Devi Singh: Gayatri's son; Saroj's husband; Gaurav, Urmi and Anushka's father; Shaurya, Chiku and Ishaani's grandfather (2013-2015)
- Hemant Thatte as Gaurav Singh: Saroj and Devi's son; Urmi and Anushka's brother; Rashmi's ex-husband; Asha's husband; Chiku's father (2013-2015)
- Sameeksha Sud as Asha Singh: Gaurav's second wife; Chiku's mother (2014-2015)
- Kunal Jaisingh / Shashank Sethi as Chiku Singh: Asha and Gaurav's son (2015)
- Mehndi Jain as Anushka "Anu" Singh: Saroj and Devi's younger daughter; Gaurav and Urmi's sister (2013-2014)
- Snigdha Srivastava as Trisha Singh: Nirmala and Mr. Singh's daughter (2013-2014)
- Massheuddin Qureshi as Mr. Singh: Nirmala's husband; Trisha's father (2013-2014)
- Guddi Maruti as Snidhu Bua (2013-2014)
- Shaji Chaudhary as Inspector Anshuman Singh (2014)
- Varun Sharma as Karan: Anushka's friend and ex-fiancé (2014)
- Priya Shinde as Natasha: Urmi's NRI friend (2014)
- Vertika Verma as Payal: Urmi's friend (2014)
- Deepali Saini as Meena: Urmi's hostel friend (2014)
- Ayush Mehra as Ravi Darshan Tiwari (2014)
- Himani Shivpuri as Sushma Tiwari (2014)
- Raju Kher as Darshan Tiwari (2014)
- Vishal Puri as Niranjan Khanna (2014-2015)
- Nidhi Jha as Nidhi Khanna (2014)
- Shefali Rana as Chhavi (2014)
- Swati Nanda as Sanaya Seth: Urmi's Mumbai friend, Samrat's ex-lover (2015)
- Shashwita Sharma as Sandhya Sinha (2015)
- Rajesh Balwani as Alok Sinha (2015)
- Mehul Kajaria as Sundar Sinha (2015)
- Keith Sequeira as James: A blackmailer (2015)
- Neetha Shetty as Kiran, Samrat's love interest (2015)
- Vikram Chatterjee as Yash Singhania (2015)
- Kapil Arya as Karan Tripathi (2015)
- Pankaj Dheer as Mr. Jaamdar (2015)
- Gaurav Chopra as Akash Kumar (2015)
- Pallavi Dutt as Sheeba Kumar; Mrs. Akash Kumar (2015)
- Mohit Shrivastava as Prathanesh Sharma (2015)
- Shahab Khan as Mr Tiwari: Diya's father (2015)
- Sunayana Fozdar as Simran: Akash Kumar's fashion designer (2015)
- Krishnam Sharma as Rahul (2015)
- Karan Mishra as Deepak (2015)

=== Guest Appearances ===
- Shabir Ahluwalia as Abhishek “Abhi” Prem Mehra from Kumkum Bhagya
- Sriti Jha as Pragya Arora Mehra from Kumkum Bhagya
- Shikha Singh as Aaliya Mehra from Kumkum Bhagya
- Toral Rasputra as Anandi Singh from Balika Vadhu
- Shashank Vyas as Jagdish Singh from Balika Vadhu
- Sidharth Shukla as Shivraj Singh from Balika Vadhu
- Sargun Mehta as Ganga Singh from Balika Vadhu
- Ashish Sharma as Rudra Pratap Ranawat from Rangrasiya
- Sanaya Irani as Paro Ranawat from Rangrasiya
- Avinash Sachdev as Shlok Agnihotri from Iss Pyaar Ko Kya Naam Doon? Ek Baar Phir
- Shrenu Parikh as Aastha Agnihotri from Iss Pyaar Ko Kya Naam Doon? Ek Baar Phir
- Sameer Sharma as Varad Agnihotri from Iss Pyaar Ko Kya Naam Doon? Ek Baar Phir
- Shalmalee Desai as Sonal Agnihotri from Iss Pyaar Ko Kya Naam Doon? Ek Baar Phir
- Harshad Arora as Zain Abdullah from Beintehaa
- Preetika Rao as Aaliya Zain Abdullah from Beintehaa
- Mrunal Jain as Akash from Uttaran
- Tina Datta as Meethi from Uttaran
- Ankita Lokhande as Ankita Naren Karmarkar from Pavitra Rishta
- Karan Veer Mehra as Naren Karmarkar from Pavitra Rishta
- Rithvik Dhanjani as Arjun Deshmukh Kirloskar from Pavitra Rishta
- Asha Negi as Purvi Deshmukh Kirloskar from Pavitra Rishta
- Karan Patel as Raman Bhalla from Yeh Hai Mohabbatein
- Divyanka Tripathi as Ishita Raman Bhalla from Yeh Hai Mohabbatein
- Shakti Arora as Ranveer Vaghela from Meri Aashiqui Tum Se Hi
- Radhika Madan as Ishani Parekh from Meri Aashiqui Tum Se Hi
- Dheeraj Dhoopar as Prem Bharadwaj from Sasural Simar Ka
- Dipika Kakar Ibrahim as Simar Prem Bharadwaj from Sasural Simar Ka
- Avika Gor as Roli Bharadwaj from Sasural Simar Ka
- Manish Raisinghan as Siddhant Bharadwaj from Sasural Simar Ka
- Ronit Roy as Dr. Nachiket Khanna from Itna Karo Na Mujhe Pyaar
- Pallavi Kulkarni as Dr. Ragini Khanna from Itna Karo Na Mujhe Pyaar
- Surbhi Jyoti as Sanam Ahmed Khan from Qubool Hai
- Karanvir Bohra as Aahil Raza Ibrahim from Qubool Hai

== Awards and nominations ==
Year	Award	Category	Recipient	Result
2014	Zee Rishtey Awards	Favourite Beti	Neha Marda	Won
2014	Zee Rishtey Awards	Favourite Nayi Jodi	Neha Marda	Nominated
2014	Zee Rishtey Awards	Favourite Behen	Neha Marda	Nominated
2014	Zee Rishtey Awards	Favourite Jodi (along with Mohit Malik)	Neha Marda	Nominated
2014	Zee Rishtey Awards	Favourite Naya Sadasya	Neha Marda	Nominated
2014	Indian Television Academy Awards	GR8! Performer of the Year – Female	Neha Marda	Nominated

Year	Award	Category	Recipient	Result
2014	Gold Awards	Best Actor In A Negative Role (Male)	Mohit Malik	Won

2014	ITA Award	GR8! Performer of the year- Male	Mohit Malik	Nominated
2015	ITA Award	Best Actor In A Negative Role (Male)	Mohit Malik	Won

Year	Award	Category	Recipient	Result
2014	Zee Rishtey Awards	Favourite Khalnayak	Mohit Malik	Won

Year	Award	Category	Recipient	Result
2014	Zee Rishtey Awards	Favourite Saas-Sasur	Geeta Tyagi (Along with Jitendra Trehan)	Nominated

Year	Award	Category	Recipient	Result
2014	Zee Rishtey Awards	Best Dialogue	Shanti Bhushan	Won

Year	Award	Category	Recipient	Result
2014	Zee Rishtey Awards	Best Dialogue	Pearl Grey	Won

Year	Award	Category	Recipient	Result
2014	Zee Rishtey Awards	Favourite Dharavahik (Fiction)	Spellbound Productions	Nominated

Year	Award	Category	Recipient	Result
2014	Zee Rishtey Awards	Favourite Behen	Ragini Ghakar (along with Neha Marda)	Nominated

Year	Award	Category	Recipient	Result
2014	Zee Rishtey Awards	Favourite Beta	Mohit Malik	Nominated

Year	Award	Category	Recipient	Result
2014	Zee Rishtey Awards	Favourite Parivaar	Doli Armaanon ki	Nominated

Year	Award	Category	Recipient	Result
2014	Zee Rishtey Awards	Favourite Bhai	Hemant Thatte	Nominated

Year	Award	Category	Recipient	Result
2014	Zee Rishtey Awards	Favourite Popular Face - Male	Mohit Malik	Nominated
2014	Zee Rishtey Awards	Favourite Saas-Jamai (along with Anjali Mukhi)	Mohit Malik	Nominated
