= Meri Aashiqui Tum Se Hi =

- Genre: Soap opera
- Based on: Wuthering Heights by Emily Bronte
- Developed by: Ekta Kapoor
- Written by: Dialogues; Dheeraj Sarna
- Screenplay by: Ritu Goel
- Story by: Sonali Jaffar
- Directed by: Anil V. Kumar; Ranjan Kumar Singh
- Starring: Shakti Arora; Radhika Madan
- Theme music composer: Dony Hazarika
- Opening theme: Tum Hi Ho
- Country of origin: India
- Original language: Hindi
- No. of seasons: 1
- No. of episodes: 446

Production
- Producers: Ekta Kapoor; Shobha Kapoor
- Production locations: Mumbai, Maharashtra, India
- Cinematography: Ashish Sharma
- Camera setup: Multi-camera
- Running time: 21–30 min Special episodes: 48–50 min
- Production company: Balaji Telefilms

Original release
- Network: Colors TV
- Release: 24 June 2014 – 19 February 2016

Meri Aashiqui Tum Se Hi (transl. Only you are my love) is an Indian soap opera based on Emily Bronte's British novel Wuthering Heights and produced by Ekta Kapoor of Balaji Telefilms. The series aired from 24 June 2014 to 19 February 2016 on Colors TV and starred Shakti Arora and Radhika Madan. It was one of the highest trp rated show of colors with 4+trp in 2015.

== Plot ==
Ishaani Parekh and Ranveer Vaghela have been childhood friends for twenty years as Ranveer's father Kailash is the driver of Ishaani's step-father Harshad Parekh. As they both grow up together, Ranveer loves Ishaani, but was hesitatant to confess it due to their parents' background difference, and thus remains only her best friend. Later they have a fallout and misunderstandings lead them to separate.

=== 6 months later ===
Ishaani is saved by Ranveer's friend, lawyer Shikhar Mehra who loves her. Ritika, posing as Ranveer's wife lives in Vaghela mansion. Ishaani gets shattered due to her mother Falguni's sudden death. As Ranveer learns the past truth he wants Ishaani back, who rejects him and decides to marry Shikhar. Ritika stabs Ishaani after revealing her true self that she killed Falguni. Ishaani recovers as Shikhar rescues her. Finally, Ritika gets exposed and jailed. Ranveer and Ishaani unite, clearing all misunderstandings.

It is revealed that Ranveer had a twin brother Milan whom Kailash gave up for adoption when they were in dire need of money after Ranveer had met with a serious accident during their childhood. Milan hates and vows to snatch everything from Ranveer. His motives are exposed later too as he commits suicide. Ritika is bailed and joins hands with Nirbhay Singh Ahlawat, who blames and wants revenge on Ranveer for his wife's death and sister Naina's paralysis.

Naina falls in love with Ranveer, who proves Nirbhay that he didn't kill his wife Pooja. Nirbhay apologizes to Ishaani and Ranveer. Ritika escapes. Ishaani and Ranveer finally unite.

== Cast ==
=== Main ===
- Shakti Arora as
  - Ranveer Vaghela – Kailash and Amba's son; Milan's twin brother; Ishaani's husband; Ritika's former fiancé
  - Milan Vaghela – Kailash and Amba's son; Ranveer's twin brother
- Radhika Madan as Ishaani Vaghela (née:Joshi/Parekh)– Faalguni and Harshad's daughter; Nitin's biological daughter, Disha's half-sister; Ranveer's wife; Chirag's and Shikhar's former fiancée

=== Recurring ===
- Shahab Khan as Kailash Vaghela – Ranveer and Milan's father
- Utkarsha Naik as Amba Vaghela – Ranveer and Milan's mother
- Arjun Bijlani as Shikhar Mehra – Ishaani's former fiancé and best friend; Ritika and Ranveer's friend
- Smriti Khanna as Ritika Zaveri – Ranveer's former fiancé and Chirag secret girlfriend
- Mohit Abrol as Nirbhay Singh Ahlawat – Ranveer's enemy-turned-friend; Ritika's friend
- Ravjeet Singh as Chirag Mehta – Ishaani ex-fiancé and Ritika's ex-boyfriend and father of Ritika's unborn child
- Gauri Pradhan as Faalguni Parekh – Nitin's ex-wife; Harshad's wife; Ishaani and Disha's mother
- Prithvi Sankhala as Harshad Parekh – Maadhvi's brother; Faalguni's husband; Ishaani's adoptive father; Disha's father
- Hiten Tejwani as Nitin Joshi – Faalguni's ex-husband; Ishaani's father
- Maleeka Ghai as Madhavi Parekh – Harshad's sister; Ishaani and Disha's aunt
- Tisha Kapoor as Disha Parekh Shah – Faalguni and Harshad's daughter; Ishaani's half-sister; Rishi's ex-fiancée; Manas's ex-wife; Krish's mother
- Anas Khan as Manas Shah – Disha's ex-husband; Krish's step-father
- Giriraj Kabra as Rishi Vyas – Disha's ex-fiancé; Krish's father
- Unknown as Krish Shah – Disha and Rishi's son; Manas's stepson
- Hardik Thakkar as Prateek Parekh – Ishaani's cousin
- Lankesh Bhardwaj as Police Inspector
- Deep Jaitely as Uttam
- Sunny Bajaj as Vikram
- Akanksha Juneja as Naina – Nirbhay's sister
- Parul Chauhan as Aarti Singh Ahlawat – Nirbhay and Naina's sister-in-law
- Dolly Sohi as Rajeshwari
- Gaurav Sarode as Shivam
- Gautam Gupta as Sharman Parekh – Ishaani's cousin, Ritika's ex-fiancé, Nimisha's boyfriend
- Aparna Dixit as Gauri – Ishaani's cousin
- Sarita Joshi as Hansa Parekh – Matriarch of the Parekh household
- Anmol Parnami as Devarsh Parekh – Ishaani's cousin; Sharman's brother
- Poonam Pandey as Krisha Parekh – Devarsh's wife; Shikhar's sister
- Nitin Vakharia as Mitesh Parekh –Ishaani and Disha's uncle; Harshad's brother; Sharman and Devarsh's father
- Manisha Kanojia/Roma Navani as Chaitali Parekh – Ishaani and Disha's aunt; Mitesh's wife; Sharman and Devarsh's mother
- Mihir Rajda as Manahar Parekh
- Amita Choksi as Vishaka Parekh
- Unknown as Ketan Mehta, Chirag and Nimisha's father
- Hetal Yadav as Shweta Ketan Mehta, Chirag and Nimisha's mother
- Pallavi Rao as Lakshmi – Amba's sister
- Parveen Kaur as Shikhar's aunt
- Lankesh Bhardwaj as Inspector
- Urmila Nimbalkar / Charu Mehra as Paarul – Lakshmi's daughter; Ranveer's cousin
- Deepak Dutta as Raaj Mehra – Shikhar's father
- Sweetly Walia as Shikhar's aunt
- Deepali Kamath as Kanchan Mehra – Shikhar's mother
- Supriya Shailaja as Nimisha Mehta – Chirag's sister and Sharman's girlfriend
- Mohsin Khan as Roumil – Gauri's abusive husband
- Zaara Khan as Ruchika
- Priyanka Chandel as Shanela – Chirag's girlfriend
- Sanjay Gandhi as Sanjeev Zaveri – Ritika's father
- Abhay Bhargava as Advocate M.F. Purohit
- Priyanka Sidana as Garima
- Sahil Miglani as Bhavesh
- Rose Sardana as Shanaya
- Imran Hasnee as Rawal
- Neel Motwani as Pranav – Gauri's ex-lover
- Amit Tandon as Rajat

=== Guest ===
- Sidharth Shukla as Shiv from Balika Vadhu
- Toral Rasputra as Anandi from Balika Vadhu
- Shashank Vyas as Jagdish Singh from Balika Vadhu (2014)
- Sargun Mehta as Ganga Jagdish Singh from Balika Vadhu (2014)
- Ankita Lokhande as Ankita Naren Kamarkar from Pavitra rishta (2014)
- Karan Veer Mehra as Naren Kamarkar from Pavitra Rishta (2014)
- Ashish Sharma as Rudra Pratap Ranawat from Rangrasiya (2014)
- Sanaya Irani as Paro from Rangrasiya (2014)
- Harshad Arora as Zain Abdullah from Beintehaa (2014)
- Preetika Rao as Aaliya Zain Abdullah from Beintehaa (2014)
- Tina Dutta as Meethi from Uttaran (2014)
- Mrunal Jain as Akash from Uttaran (2014)
- Dipika Kakar as Simar Prem Bharadwaj from Sasural Simar Ka (2015)
- Dheeraj Dhoopar as Prem Bharadwaj from Sasural Simar Ka (2015)
- Avika Gor as Roli Siddhant Bharadwaj from Sasural Simar Ka (2015)
- Manish Raisinghan as Siddhant Bharadwaj from Sasural Simar Ka (2015)
- Ronit Roy as Dr Nachiket "Neil" Khanna from Itna Karo na muhje pyaar (2015)
- Pallavi Kulkarni as Dr Ragini Khanna from Itna Karo na muhje pyaar (2015)
- Shabir Alhuwalia as Abhishek "Abhi" Prem mehra from Kumkum Bhagya (2016)
- Sriti Jha as Pragya Arora Mehra from Kumkum Bhagya (2016)
- Varun Kapoor as Sanskar from Swaragini (2016)
- Helly Shah as Swara from Swaragini (2016)
- Namish Taneja as Lakshya from Swaragini (2016)
- Tejasswi Prakash as Ragini from Swaragini (2016)
- Mouni Roy as Shivanya
- Adaa Khan as Shesha

== Awards and nominations ==
Year	Award	Category	Recipient	Result
2014	Indian Television Academy Awards	GR8! Performer of the Year - Male	Shakti Arora	Nominated
2015	Indian Telly Awards	Best On-Screen Couple	Shakti Arora & Radhika Madan	Nominated
2015	Indian Telly Awards	Best Actor in Lead Role (Popular)	Shakti Arora	Nominated
2015	Indian Telly Awards	Best Fresh New Face (Female)	Radhika Madan	Won
2015	Kalakar Awards	Rising Star of the Year	Shakti Arora	Won
2015	Indian Television Academy Awards	Youth Icon of the Year	Shakti Arora	Won
2015	Indian Television Academy Awards	Best Fresh New Face (Female)	Radhika Madan	Won
2015	Gold Awards	Gold Debut in Lead Role (Female)	Radhika Madan	Won
2016	Indian Television Academy Awards	Youth Icon of the Year (Female)	Radhika Madan	Won
2016	Kalakar Awards	Best Actress (Popular)	Radhika Madan	Won
