= 2017 Premier Badminton League =

Tournament details
- Dates: 1 Jan 2017 – 14 Jan 2017
- Edition: 2
- Location: India
- Official website: www.pbl-india.com

Results
- Champions: Chennai Smashers
- Runners-up: Mumbai Rockets
- Semi-finalists: Awadhe Warriors, Hyderabad Hunters

2017 Premier Badminton League (also known as Vodafone PBL 2017 for sponsorship reasons) was the second edition of Premier Badminton League. It started on 1 January 2017 and concluded on 14 January 2017. It consisted of 15 league ties (each tie consisting of 5 matches) and the top four teams progressed to the knock out stages. Sachin Tendulkar became a co-owner of Bengaluru Topguns before the season and they were renamed as Bengaluru Blasters.
Awadhe Warriors, Mumbai Rockets, Chennai Smashers and Hyderabad Hunters entered the semi-finals after topping the league table. Chennai Smashers beat Awadhe Warriors 4-1 and Mumbai Rockets beat Hyderabad Hunters 3-(-1) to proceed to the final. Chennai Smashers won the tournament after beating Mumbai Rockets 4-3.

== Squads ==
The complete list of players of all the six participating teams

Delhi Acers	Awadhe Warriors	Mumbai Rockets	Hyderabad Hunters	Bengaluru Blasters	Chennai Smashers
(Denmark) Jan Ø. Jørgensen	(India) Srikanth Kidambi	(India) Ajay Jayaram	(India) B. Sai Praneeth	(Denmark) Viktor Axelsen	(India) P. V. Sindhu
(India) Siril Verma	(Hong Kong) Wong Wing Ki	(India) Prannoy Kumar	(India) Sameer Verma	(India) Sourabh Varma	(India) Arundhati Pantawane
(South Korea) Son Wan-ho	(India) Saina Nehwal	(India) Shreyansh Jaiswal	(England) Rajiv Ouseph	(Thailand) Boonsak Ponsana	(India) Parupalli Kashyap
(India) Aakarshi Kashyap	(India) Rituparna Das	(South Korea) Sung Ji-hyun	(Spain) Carolina Marín	(India) Gadde Ruthvika Shivani	(Thailand) Tanongsak Saensomboonsuk
(Thailand) Nichaon Jindapon	(Thailand) Bodin Issara	(India) Vrushali Gummadi	(India) Sri Krishna Priya	(Hong Kong) Cheung Ngan Yi	(Indonesia) Tommy Sugiarto
(India) Akshay Dewalkar	(Malaysia) Goh V Shem	(Thailand) Nipitphon Puangpuapech	(India) Satwiksairaj Rankireddy	(India) N. Sikki Reddy	(England) Gabby Adcock
(Russia) Ivan Sozonov	(Indonesia) Markis Kido	(India) Mohita Sahdev	(Malaysia) Tan Boon Heong	(India) Ashwini Ponnappa	(India) Ramya Tulasi
(Russia) Vladimir Ivanov	(India) Prajakta Sawant	(Poland) Nadieżda Zięba	(Malaysia) Tan Wee Kiong	(India) Pranav Chopra	(India) B. Sumeeth Reddy
(India) Jwala Gutta	(Thailand) Savitree Amitrapai	(India) Chirag Shetty	(Hong Kong) Chau Hoi Wah	(South Korea) Ko Sung-hyun	(England) Chris Adcock
(India) K. Maneesha	(India) Aditya Joshi	(South Korea) Lee Yong-dae	(India) Meghana Jakkampudi	(South Korea) Yoo Yeon-seong	(Denmark) Mads Pieler Kolding
		(India) Sanjana Santosh			
		(India) Tarun Kona			

== Points Table ==
Team	TP	RMW	TMW	TML	Pts.
Awadhe Warriors	5	11	5	0	21
Mumbai Rockets (RU)	5	12	4	1	19
Chennai Smashers (C)	5	8	5	0	18
Hyderabad Hunters	5	10	3	2	14
Bengaluru Blasters	5	7	3	2	11
Delhi Acers	5	4	3	2	8

Qualified for semifinals

- Each tie (TP) will have five matches each.
- Regular Match Win (RMW) = 1 point
- Trump Match Win (TMW) = 2 points
- Trump Match Lost (TML) = -1 point.

== Fixtures ==
The fixtures for the 2017 Premier Badminton League are as follows

Date	Venue	Team 1	Result	Team 2
League Stage
1 Jan	Hyderabad	Hyderabad Hunters	4-3	Chennai Smashers
1 Jan	Hyderabad	Bengaluru Blasters	4-3	Delhi Acers
2 Jan	Hyderabad	Hyderabad Hunters	0-5	Awadhe Warriors
3 Jan	Mumbai	Bengaluru Blasters	0-5	Chennai Smashers
3 Jan	Mumbai	Delhi Acers	(-1)-6	Mumbai Rockets
4 Jan	Mumbai	Hyderabad Hunters	1-2	Mumbai Rockets
5 Jan	Lucknow	Awadhe Warriors	6-(-1)	Delhi Acers
6 Jan	Lucknow	Awadhe Warriors	3-4	Mumbai Rockets
7 Jan	Bangalore	Bengaluru Blasters	3-4	Hyderabad Hunters
8 Jan	Bangalore	Delhi Acers	5-2	Chennai Smashers
8 Jan	Bangalore	Bengaluru Blasters	1-4	Mumbai Rockets
9 Jan	Bangalore	Bengaluru Blasters	3-4	Awadhe Warriors
10 Jan	Bangalore	Mumbai Rockets	3-4	Chennai Smashers
11 Jan	Bangalore	Awadhe Warriors	3-4	Chennai Smashers
12 Jan	New Delhi	Delhi Acers	2-5	Hyderabad Hunters
Semi-finals
13 Jan	New Delhi	Awadhe Warriors	1-4	Chennai Smashers
13 Jan	New Delhi	Mumbai Rockets	3-(-1)	Hyderabad Hunters
Finals
14 Jan	New Delhi	Chennai Smashers	4-3	Mumbai Rockets

=== Knockout stage ===
Semi-finals
13 January – New Delhi
Awadhe Warriors	1
Chennai Smashers	4
13 January – New Delhi
Mumbai Rockets	3
Hyderabad Hunters	-1

Final
14 January – New Delhi
Chennai Smashers	4
Mumbai Rockets	3
