= Rajesh Joshi =

Rajesh Joshi may refer to:

- Rajesh Joshi (poet)
- Rajesh Joshi (actor)
