= Man Mein Hai Visshwas =

Indian television series

- Promotional logo
- Created by: Vikas Kapoor
- Directed by: Rajeev Bhanot; Suyash Vadhavkar
- Presented by: Nitish Bharadwaj; Shakti Arora
- Starring: See below
- Opening theme: "Man Mein Hai Visshwas" by
- Country of origin: India
- Original language: Hindi
- No. of seasons: 2
- No. of episodes: 81

Production
- Producers: Dheeraj Kumar & Zuby Kocchar
- Running time: approx. 40 minutes
- Production company: Creative Eye Limited

Original release
- Network: Sony TV
- Release: 18 August 2006 – 2007

Man Mein Hai Visshwas (transl. Hope is in the heart) is an Indian drama anthology television series that aired on Sony TV channel. In the series, Nitish Bharadwaj presents stories based on people's real-life experiences, which mainly revolve around faith.

The series premiered on 18 August 2006, and aired every Friday at 8pm IST.

== Concept ==
The show portrayed real life incidents related to God, faith, and miracles. Each episode was inspired by the experiences of people from all corners of India, whose lives changed after experiencing incidents that could be described as "miraculous."

== Hosts ==
- Nitish Bharadwaj (Season 1)
- Shakti Arora (Season 2)

== Cast ==
- Chandan Madanvas Gooms
- Ayaan Zubair Rahmani as Gyan
- Niilam Paanchal as Rasila
