= Swati Nanda =

Swati Nanda (born Gujarat state, India) is an Indian television actress, model, and the winner of the Top Model of the World pageant of 2014. Swati appeared in Doli Armaano Ki as Sanaya Seth (Urmi's friend). She has also starred in various other TV shows, ramp shows, TV commercials, and music videos. Nanda studied at K.J. Somaiya College of Engineering.
