= Cinta di Pangkuan Himalaya =

Indonesian romantic drama television series

- Genre: Drama; Romance
- Created by: Raam Punjabi
- Written by: Tim MVP
- Directed by: Sridhar Jetty
- Starring: Shakti Arora; Radhika Madan; Melayu Nicole; Ankit Bathla; Digangana Suryavanshi; Mrunal Jain; Tio Pakusadewo; Christ Laurent; Cut Tari; Unique Priscilla; Lucky Alamsyah
- Opening theme: "Sementara Sendiri" — Geisha
- Ending theme: "Sementara Sendiri" — Geisha
- Country of origin: Indonesia
- Original language: Indonesian
- No. of seasons: 1
- No. of episodes: 14

Production
- Producer: Raam Punjabi
- Camera setup: Multi-camera
- Running time: 60 minutes
- Production company: Tripar Multivision Plus

Original release
- Network: ANTV
- Release: 8 May – 21 May 2017

Cinta di Pangkuan Himalaya is an Indonesian television romantic drama series that premiered on 8 May 2017 on ANTV. Produced by Raam Punjabi under the banner of Tripar Multivision Plus, it starred Shakti Arora, Radhika Madan, Melayu Nicole and Cut Tari. The series was shot as a web series and later premiered on TV as a finite series due to the popularity of lead actors.

== Plot ==
Sakti, who is the son of a rich businessman in Indonesia named Adiyaksa and Hilda.

Sakti was assigned by his father to develop a lodging business in Nepal for several months. On the way to Nepal, Sakti accidentally meets a beautiful girl named Sarah, daughter of Mamu Jaan and Mami Jaan. Sarah and her best friend, Digi, became Sakti's tour guide while in Nepal.

Sarah and Sakti's relationship is getting closer because every day they spend time together traveling around the city and exploring the beauty of the Himalayas.

Unbeknownst to Sakti, Sarah has been arranged by a rich man named Jakir to help her family. Sakti himself doesn't know that in Jakarta he has arranged an arranged marriage with his best friend, Raya, to help her family's current finances.

On the other hand, Hilda orders a person named Thapa who is assisted by Arman, Sarah and Jakir's brother, to harm Sarah and Sakti in Nepal. But Arman turned against Jakir.

== Cast ==
=== Main ===
- Shakti Arora as Sakti
- Radhika Madan as Sarah
- Melayu Nicole as Raya

=== Recurring ===
- Ankit Bathla as Jakir
- Digangana Suryavanshi as Digi
- Mrunal Jain as Arman
- Tio Pakusadewo as Adiyaksa
- Cut Tari as Hilda
- Christ Laurent as Zidan
- Jerry Kemit as Surya
- Unique Priscilla as Pricilla
- Lucky Alamsyah as Lucky

== Productions ==
=== Casting ===
Cut Tari was selected to portray the lead role of Hilda. Christ Laurent was selected to portray Zidan.
