= Kuttey =

2023 Indian action thriller film

- Theatrical release poster
- Directed by: Aasmaan Bhardwaj
- Written by: Vishal Bhardwaj; Aasmaan Bhardwaj
- Produced by: Ankur Garg; Vishal Bhardwaj; Luv Ranjan; Rekha Bhardwaj
- Starring: Tabu; Arjun Kapoor; Naseeruddin Shah; Radhika Madan; Konkona Sen Sharma; Kumud Mishra
- Cinematography: Farhad Ahmed Dehlvi
- Edited by: A. Sreekar Prasad
- Music by: Vishal Bhardwaj
- Production companies: T-Series Films; Luv Films; VB Films
- Distributed by: Yash Raj Films
- Release date: 13 January 2023
- Running time: 108 minutes
- Country: India
- Language: Hindi
- Budget: est. ₹80 crore
- Box office: est. ₹4.65 crore

Kuttey (transl. Dogs) is a 2023 Indian Hindi-language action thriller film written and directed by Aasmaan Bhardwaj in his directorial debut, who co-wrote the script with his father Vishal Bhardwaj. It is produced by Vishal Bhardwaj Films, T-Series and Luv Films, and features an ensemble cast of Tabu, Arjun Kapoor, Naseeruddin Shah, Radhika Madan, Konkona Sen Sharma and Kumud Mishra.

Principal photography commenced in September 2021 and continued till February 2022 where most of the film being shot in Mumbai. The film's cinematography was handled by Farhad Ahmed Dehlvi and edited by A. Sreekar Prasad. Bhardwaj further composed the film's soundtrack and score, with lyrics written by Gulzar and Faiz Ahmad Faiz.

Kuttey was theatrically released on 13 January 2023, to mixed-to-negative reviews from critics, with praise directed on the performances (particularly Tabu's), cinematography, direction and music, but criticism for the screenplay. The film was a box-office disaster grossing ₹4.65 crore towards a budget of ₹80 crore.

== Premise ==
On a rainy night in the outskirts of Mumbai, three gangs cross paths while they hunt a van carrying crores of cash. A complex maze of subplots with greed as the Common motive leads to a tense often hilarious chain of events.

== Cast ==
- Tabu as Poonam Sandhu aka Pammi
- Arjun Kapoor as Gopal Tiwari
- Naseeruddin Shah as Narayan Khobre
- Konkona Sen Sharma as Lakshmi Sharma
- Radhika Madan as Lovely Khobre, Narayan's daughter
- Kumud Mishra as Viswapal Suri aka Paaji
- Shardul Bhardwaj as Danny Dandekar
- Lavishka Gupta as Gopal's Daughter
- Ashish Vidyarthi as Harry
- Vijayant Kohli as Mamu
- Jay Upadhyay as Surti
- Santosh Juvekar as Police Inspector
- Anurag Kashyap as Politician
- Vijay Kumar Singh as Shankar
- Jagbir Singh Pannu as Police Inspector
- Aasmaan Bhardwaj as IPS Officer Rajiv Mishra
- Brij Gopal as Manohar
- Ashwini Mishra as Commissioner Of Police
- Ajit Shidhaye as Jehangir

== Production ==
=== Development ===
On 23 August 2021, Luv Films and T-Series Films announced a crime thriller film Kuttey, directed by Aasmaan Bhardwaj, son of writer-director-composer Vishal Bhardwaj and singer Rekha Bhardwaj, in his directorial debut. Aasman, who studied screenwriting at the School of Visual Arts in New York University, penned the screenplay with his father, who also co-produced the film. Aasman described the plot as character-driven and took references from the Quentin Tarantino-directed Reservoir Dogs (1992) to develop the character. The title of the film was also inspired from Reservoir Dogs, where Aasmaan researched on it and what he read about the title "the reservoirs – the streams that run and the dogs who come there always fight amongst each other despite the stream being so long". It triggered his thought on the tile being related to animals. At one point, he decided to title it as Awaara Dogs, based on a song from the film, which was "half-Hindi half-English" and later on Dogs, before finalising Kuttey as the title. Aasmaan claimed that the title served as a call back to Kaminey (2009) directed by his father and also referred it as a "close cousin" of the latter.

Tabu, Arjun Kapoor, Naseeruddin Shah, Radhika Madan, Konkona Sen Sharma, Kumud Mishra and Shardul Bhardwaj were cast in primary roles with the film's announcement. Aasman designed all of the characters as grey-shaded, influenced by Vishal's filmography. Originally, Tabu's character was initially written in a place of a male actor as Paramjit Singh, however, the producer Luv Ranjan suggested it to change as a female character and wanted Tabu to play that role. Aasman discussed this to Vishal who accepted it and cast Tabu for the role, due to the latter's longtime working relationship. Eventually, the character's name was changed to Poonam Sandhu. The script was written with Arjun Kapoor in mind after his performances in Ishaqzaade (2012) and Sandeep Aur Pinky Faraar (2021).

=== Filming ===
Principal photography began in September 2021. Vishal who participated in the muhurat shot could not supervise the rest of the filming, as he also started working on Khufiya. Eventually, Tabu completed much of her portions during the intermittent schedule breaks. Production was further interrupted due to the COVID-19 pandemic lockdown but resumed in that February, where 15 days of the final portions being filmed. Filming wrapped on the same month.

== Soundtrack ==
The music of the film is composed by Vishal Bhardwaj, with lyrics penned by Gulzar and Faiz Ahmad Faiz. The soundtrack was released by T-Series on 9 January 2023 at the Mehfil-E-Khaas music launch event, which saw performances from Gulzar, Vishal and Rekha Bhardwaj.

== Reception ==
Kuttey received mixed-to-negative reviews from critics with praise for its performances (particularly Tabu's), cinematography, music and background score while criticism for its screenplay. On the review aggregator website Rotten Tomatoes, 36% of 14 critics' reviews are positive, with an average rating of 5.3/10. It received mixed reviews from audiences.

Monika Rawal Kukreja of Hindustan Times wrote, "It's a one-time watch and if nothing else, enjoy the music." Ronak Kotecha of The Times of India rated the film 3.5 out of 5 stars and wrote, "Kuttey starts off with a bang and keeps powering its screenplay with interestingly dark, sharp and self-centred characters". He added "it's easy to pick your favourite. Tabu tops the list her pitch is perfect and appears effortless, Kapoor has more to do, and the actor delivers an honest performance while Naseeruddin Shah, Konkana, Radhika, Shardul and Kumud make their limited time on screen count".

Zinia Bandyopadhyay of India Today rated the film 3 out of 5 stars and wrote, "Kuttey is best enjoyed if you have a knack for dark and wry humour. However, if gore is not your cup of tea, it is best to steer clear from this one. The performances are indeed the strong suit in the film Mishra and Kapoor both will leave you impressed, Tabu, steals the show, Madan is delight to watch, Naseerudin and Konkona’s extended cameo, sets the mood wish they had more screen time". Avinash Lohana of Pinkvilla rated the film 3 out of 5 stars and wrote, "Kuttey does entertain and enthral, but in parts. The film was capable of a lot more and doesn’t optimise its potential. Kapoor gives a sincere performance, Tabu, Konkona, Kumud delivered controlled performance which leaves an impact, Radhika and Shardul shine in their respective roles".

Bollywood Hungama rated the film 3 out of 5 stars and wrote, "Kuttey rests on an interesting concept and strong performances but suffers from excessive violence and usage of cuss words". Saibal Chatterjee of NDTV rated the film 3 out of 5 stars and wrote, "Kuttey is a film that certainly does not bark up the wrong tree. On performances she highlighted Tabu's work, who delivers unblemished performance, and admirably supported well by Mishra, Kapoor, Madan and Bharadwaj go along with the flow of the wild tale without missing a beat, while Naseeruddin Shah and Konkona Sen do full justice to their limited roles". Anna M. M. Vetticad of Firstpost rated it 2 out of 5 stars and wrote, "Kuttey needed some meat to bark. The film doesn’t have a very convincing storyline the unnecessary violence, use of cuss words and a huge waste of some good craftsmen".

== See also ==
- Kaminey (2009 film)
