= Bhoot and Friends =

2010 film by Karanjeet Saluja

- Directed by: Karanjeet "Kittu" Saluja
- Written by: Reshma A. Dev; Sachindra Sharma
- Screenplay by: Aneesh Arjun Dev
- Produced by: Aneesh Arjun Dev
- Starring: Jackie Shroff; Nishikant Dixit; Ashwin Mushran; Ishita Panchal; Akash Nair
- Cinematography: Krishna Ramanan
- Edited by: K.D. Dilip
- Music by: Sunil Singh
- Production company: Wide Angle Media Pvt. Ltd.
- Release date: 31 December 2010
- Running time: 137 minutes
- Country: India
- Languages: Hindi; English
- Budget: est. ₹1.5 crore
- Box office: est. ₹1.5 lakh

Bhoot and Friends is a 2010 Indian horror-comedy film directed by Karanjeet "Kittu" Saluja. The film has got "U" certificate by CBFC. The film opened up to negative reviews and was a box-office disaster.

== Synopsis ==
The film revolves around four children spending their summer holidays at their maternal grandmother's home. They encounter a friendly ghost with magical powers who helps them find a precious treasure called "Neelmani Ka Khazana" (transl. Blue sapphire's treasure).

== Cast ==
- Jackie Shroff as Bhanu Pratap Singh / Bhoot (transl. Ghost)
- Ashwin Mushran as Gora Sa'ab / Gora Sahab (transl. English man)
- Markand Soni as Raghav
- Tejas Rahate as Ali
- Ishita Panchal as Roma
- Akash Nair as Igloo
- Aditya Lakhia as Ali's Father
- Nishikant Dixit as Sharmaji Manager
- A.r.rama as Hakla/Haklu
- Sushil Pandey as Baanke
- Ashish Kattar as Raghav's father
- Sonu Shajahanpuriya as Gajraj
- Madan as Tad Singh
- Mahesh Raj as Commissioner
- Reshmi Sarkar as TV reporter
- Rajesh Dubey as jogi
- Rishina Khandari as Raghav's mother
- Mahru Sheikh as Raghav's grandmother
- Mahesh Mewara as Nanku
- Yashwant Wasnik as Abdul chacha
- Pradeep Kabra as Takla/Taklu

== Production ==
The film is also directed by three additional directors named: Harish Kumar Patel, Brijesh Singh and Kuldeep Yadav. The stunts were added by Hanif Sheikh.

== Release ==
Film is initially going to release on 24 December along with Toonpur Ka Superhero as Christmas bonanza, but postponed till last date of year due to clash with Tees Mar Khan. The film is released theatrically on New Year's Eve of 2011 but only on 25 prints.

=== Home media ===
The film is currently available on Disney+ Hotstar, Amazon Prime and YouTube, and is often broadcast by Cartoon Network India.

== Box office ==
The film has grossed an estimated ₹1.5 lakh (US$1,600), against a huge budget of ₹1.5 crore (US$160,000) and declared as "disaster" by Box Office India. It earned ₹25,000 on first day and ₹75,000 on first weekend.

== Critical reception ==
The film has received generally mixed to negative reviews by critics.

== Animated series ==
In 2019, an animated series based on the film is produced by the same production company, directed by Ramji Achary, and is currently provided by Amazon Prime. The series consists of 10 episodes, each of 10 minutes.
