= Ishita Panchal =

Indian Bollywood and television child actress

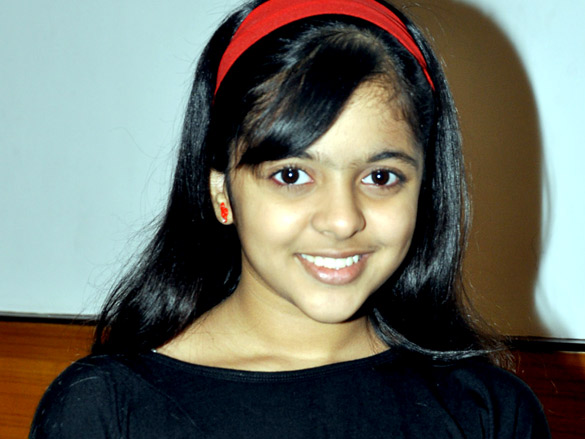
- Panchal in 2013
- Born: 1 December 1998 (age 27); Mumbai, Maharashtra, India
- Occupations: Actress, doctor
- Years active: 2008–2011
- Known for: Uttaran

Ishita Panchal (born 1 December 1998) is an Indian film and television actress. She is known for playing the lead role of Roma in Bollywood horror film Bhoot and Friends (2010).

Panchal started her career with the role of young Tapasya in Colors TV's popular and successful show Uttaran. She then appeared in the movie Ek Vivaah Aisa Bhi. She is the only child of her parents, who are doctors. She has completed her MBBS.

== Filmography ==
=== Films ===
Year	Title	Role	Ref.
2008	Ek Vivaah Aisa Bhi	Unnamed	
2010	Ramaa: The Saviour	Ridhi	
2010	Bhoot and Friends	Roma	
2011	7 Khoon Maaf	Young Suzanna (Uncredited)	

=== Television ===
Year	Title	Role	Ref.
2007	Amber Dhara	Young Amber	
2008–2009	Uttaran	Young Tapasya	
2011	CID		
