= Pavitra Rishta =

Indian television series

- Genre: Soap opera
- Based on: Thirumathi Selvam by S. Kumaran
- Developed by: Ekta Kapoor
- Screenplay by: R M Joshi; Anil Nagpal; Gitangshu Dey; Vikas Tiwari; Nidhi Singh; Neha Shrivastava; Ved Raj; Shweta Bhardwaj; Dialogues; Shirish Latkar
- Story by: S Kumaran
- Directed by: Ravindra Gautam; Mujammil Desai; Kushal Zaveri; Jignesh Vaishnav; V.G.Roy; Ajay Veermal; Jafar Sheikh; Sangieta Rao; Partho Mitra; Sameer Kulkarni; Bhavin Thakkar; Vicky Chauhan
- Creative directors: Doris Dey; Tanushree Dasgupta; Sukriti Saxena; Neeshi Oza; Shravan Pundir; Mitu; Meghana Amal
- Starring: Ankita Lokhande; Sushant Singh Rajput; Hiten Tejwani; Asha Negi; Shakti Arora; Rithvik Dhanjani; Karan Veer Mehra
- Theme music composer: Sunil Singh; Devendra Kafir
- Opening theme: "Āsamāna Mēṁ Jaba Taka" by Priya Bhattacharya
- Country of origin: India
- Original language: Hindi
- No. of seasons: 4
- No. of episodes: 1,424

Production
- Producers: Ekta Kapoor; Shobha Kapoor
- Production locations: Mumbai, India.
- Cinematography: Suhas Shirodkar; Rajan Singh
- Editors: Vikas Sharma; Vishal Sharma; Manas Majumdar
- Camera setup: Multi-camera
- Running time: 20 minutes
- Production company: Balaji Telefilms

Original release
- Network: Zee TV
- Release: 1 June 2009 – 25 October 2014

Related
- Thirumathi Selvam

Pavitra Rishta (International title: Sacred Relationship) is a 2009 Indian Hindi-language soap opera produced by Ekta Kapoor of Balaji Telefilms that aired on Zee TV from 1 June 2009 to 25 October 2014 starring Ankita Lokhande, Sushant Singh Rajput, Hiten Tejwani, Asha Negi, Shakti Arora, Rithvik Dhanjani and Karan Veer Mehra in lead roles . It is an adaptation of Tamil television series Thirumathi Selvam. It is the third longest-running Indian television series of Zee TV.

== Plot ==
Homely and hard-working Archana Karanjkar marries Manav Deshmukh, a mere mechanic. They gradually come to support and fall in love with each other, despite their respective families being at loggerheads, as Manav’s mother, Savita, lied to Archana’s mother about his profession. Manav's brother Sachin dies in an accident while his fiancée, Shravani, is pregnant, and Manav is asked to take Shravani's responsibility. Archana and Manav divorce for the future of Shravani's unborn child, and Archana leaves Mumbai to complete her higher education.

=== 2 years later ===
Archana is now educated and returns to Mumbai, while Manav is raising Shravani's son, who is named after Sachin. Eventually, Archana-Manav reunite and Shravani leaves abroad, giving Jr. Sachin to them. Archana has a miscarriage and Manav determines himself to become successful. He meets a rich businessman, Digvijay Kirloskar, and starts working with him.

=== 4 years later ===
Manav is now a rich business tycoon. Manav and Archana now have a son, Soham, who is specially liked by Archana's childless sister, Varsha. Later, Archana delivers twin daughters, Ovi and Tejaswini. Varsha abducts Soham and they're presumed dead. Archana gets blamed for the loss of Soham as she had previously ignored Manav's warning to keep Soham away from Varsha.

Manav decides to move to Canada with his family to further his business. He sends flight tickets to Archana through Savita, who doesn't tell her anything about the tickets and misinforms Archana that Manav wants divorce. Later, Savita signs on the divorce papers on Archana's behalf and lies to Manav that Archana wants divorce. Thus, Manav moves abroad without Archana, who is left shattered and later adopts an orphaned baby girl, Purvi. Archana’s other sister, Vaishali leaves her husband, Dharmesh due to his abusive behavior on herself and her children.

=== 18 years later ===
Manav returns to India with his family to finalize their divorce, and is ordered a six-month courtship together with Archana. Varsha and Soham are revealed to be alive as goons "Jhumri" and "Vishnu Lala" in Bihar. Ovi's marriage is fixed with Digvijay's son, Arjun, while he is in love with Purvi. He soon reveals his love for Purvi and breaks his alliance with Ovi, leaving her shattered. Ovi tells Purvi that if she lets her marry Arjun instead, then she will stop Manav from divorcing Archana. For Archana's happiness, Purvi begs Arjun to marry Ovi and thus, Arjun-Ovi get married. Tejaswini and Manav’s father, Damodar expose Savita's conspiracy, uniting Archana and Manav. The couple learn about Soham but he refuses to accept them as his parents. Archana’s niece, Punni, creates a rift between Ovi and Purvi, making Ovi believe that Arjun and Purvi are having an extra-marital affair. To save Ovi-Arjun's marriage life, Purvi shifts to Kolkata.

Six months later, Purvi, who is pregnant, is married to Dr. Onir, a gynecologist. They return Mumbai to treat Ovi, who is also pregnant having complications. Soham eventually accepts both Manav and Archana as his parents. It is revealed that Purvi actually got pregnant with Arjun's child when they accidentally had sex while taking shelter in a cabin. Ovi loses her son while Purvi delivers a daughter. She replaces her daughter with Ovi's child with Onir's help. Arjun and Purvi's daughter is named Pari. Soon, Ovi-Arjun and Onir-Purvi divorce. Manav and Archana decide to get Arjun and Purvi married so that Pari gets her full family. Arjun and Purvi get married. Ovi moves to Canada and finds out that she's pregnant again with Arjun's child.

Tejaswini falls in love with Snehlata's son, Sunny, who also falls in love with Punni's sister, Ruchita. But they have to break up as Savita and Snehlata are rivals. Soham falls in love with Dr. Gauri but her alliance gets fixed with Jr. Sachin. He kidnaps Gauri and tries to forcefully marry her in the temple. Gauri gets accidentally shot by Soham and falls into a river with him. Arjun meets Ovi in Canada and is shocked on learning about his and Ovi's daughter, Pia. Purvi misunderstands that Arjun has cheated on her with Ovi. She shifts to Canada with Pari and the entire family while Ovi moves to Australia with Pia.

=== 20 years later ===
Purvi returns to Mumbai and realizes that Arjun never cheated on her with Ovi. Arjun is revealed to have brain tumor, so he and Purvi move to Australia for treatment. Pia helps Ovi to unite with her parents and family. Soham, revealed to be alive, has changed his name to Raghav Mhatre, and lives with his five children who are struggling financially due to his alcoholism. His eldest daughter, Ankita, resembles Archana and is the sole earner of the family. She meets Naren Karmarkar, a mentally challenged businessman grieving the loss of his lover, Ahaana.

Soon, Naren starts assuming Ankita as Ahaana. Ankita is compelled to marry Naren at the behest of his mother, Rushali, who agrees to offer her money and support her siblings financially. Gradually, Ankita falls in love with Naren, who recovers, and they consummate their marriage, leaving Ankita pregnant. Pari reluctantly agrees to marry Shekhar after the disappearance of her lover, Aman. On Shekhar and Pari's wedding day, Naren discovers that Pari is Ahaana and she discovers that Naren is Aman. It is revealed that Naren and Pari met each other in London where they exchanged fake names and fell in love but unfortunately a car accident separated them. Soham meets his family but still holds a grudge against them. Naren forgets his memories with Ankita and reconciles with Pari.

Rushali lies to everyone that Ankita had a contract marriage with Naren which was valid only until Naren's recovery. Ankita decides to sacrifice her love for Naren's happiness and conceals her pregnancy. Despite Soham's pleas, Naren and Pari marry and Ankita leaves Mumbai. Soon, Pari has a miscarriage and is declared infertile. Ankita gives birth to Naren's child but it is declared stillborn by the doctors. Naren and Pari adopt a baby girl and name her as Ashi.

=== 5 years later ===
Ankita returns to Mumbai and Manav makes her the managing director of his company. Pari starts getting jealous of Ankita and plans her murder. Naren and Ankita learn that Ashi is their biological daughter. It is revealed that Rushali had stolen Arushi from Ankita and bribed the doctors to misinform her that her child was stillborn. Naren learns about Pari's evil schemes, divorces her, and reunites with Ankita. Pari realizes their true love. She is reunited with Purvi and Arjun, who return to Mumbai, and accepts Arjun as her father. Soham overcomes his grudge and finally reconciles with Manav and Archana.

Ankita and Naren remarry. Manav-Archana, Arjun-Purvi, and Ankita-Naren together commemorate their "Pavitra Rishta" (sacred relationship). Manav meets with a fatal accident and Archana dies of grief. Their family mourns their death. Their souls are shown to be in heaven together, expressing their undying love for each other.

== Cast ==
=== Main ===
- Ankita Lokhande as
  - Archana "Archu" Karanjkar Deshmukh – Sulochana and Manohar's eldest daughter; Vinod, Varsha and Vaishali's sister; Manav's wife; Soham, Ovi and Tejaswini's mother; Jr. Sachin and Purvi's adoptive mother; Pia, Ankita, Prashant, Mansi, Pranav and Sonali's grandmother; Pari, Gaurav and Pushti's adoptive grandmother; Priya and Ashi's great-grandmother (2009–2014)
  - Ankita Deshmukh Karmarkar – Soham's eldest daughter; Prashant and Mansi's sister; Pranav and Sonali's half-sister; Naren's wife; Ashi's mother (2013–2014)
- Sushant Singh Rajput / Hiten Tejwani as Manav Deshmukh – Savita and Damodar's elder son; Sachin and Vandita's brother; Archana's husband; Soham, Ovi and Tejaswini's father; Jr. Sachin and Purvi's adoptive father; Pia, Ankita, Prashant, Mansi, Pranav and Sonali's grandfather; Pari, Gaurav and Pushti's adoptive grandfather; Priya and Ashi's great-grandfather (2009–2011) / (2011–2014)
- Asha Negi as Purvi Deshmukh Kirloskar – Archana and Manav's adopted daughter; Jr. Sachin, Soham, Ovi and Tejaswini's adopted sister; Onir's ex-wife; Arjun's wife; Pari's mother; Pia's step-mother (2011–2014)
- Rithvik Dhanjani as Arjun Kirloskar – Digvijay and Ashna's son; Ovi's ex-husband; Purvi's husband; Pari and Pia's father (2011–2014)
- Karan Veer Mehra as Naren "Aman" Karmarkar – Rushali and Shirish's elder son; Raunak's brother; Pari's ex-husband; Ankita's husband; Ashi's father (2013–2014)

=== Recurring ===
Deshmukh family

- Usha Nadkarni as Savita Deshmukh – Damodar's wife; Manav, Sachin and Vandita's mother; Jr. Sachin, Munni, Soham, Ovi and Tejaswini's grandmother; Purvi's adoptive grandmother; Pia, Ankita, Prashant, Mansi, Pranav, Sonali, Gaurav and Pushti's great-grandmother; Pari's adoptive great-grandmother; Priya and Ashi's great-great-grandmother (2009–2014)
- Ajay Wadhavkar as Damodar Rao Deshmukh – Vishwas's brother; Savita's husband; Manav, Sachin and Vandita's father; Jr. Sachin, Munni, Soham, Ovi and Tejaswini's grandfather; Purvi's adoptive grandfather; Pia, Ankita, Prashant, Mansi, Pranav, Sonali, Gaurav and Pushti's great-grandfather; Pari's adoptive great-grandfather; Priya and Ashi's great-great-grandfather (2009–2014)
- Sunil Godse as Vishwas Rao Deshmukh – Damodar's brother; Manav, Sachin and Vandita's uncle (2009–2010)
- Raj Singh Suryavanshi as Sachin Deshmukh – Savita and Damodar's younger son; Manav and Vandita's brother; Shravani's fiancé; Jr. Sachin's father; Gaurav and Pushti's grandfather (2009)
- Ankit Narang as Soham Deshmukh aka Vishnu Lala / Raghav Mhatre – Archana and Manav's son; Ovi and Tejaswini's brother; Jr. Sachin and Purvi's adopted brother; Ratna's ex-husband; Ankita, Prashant, Mansi, Pranav and Sonali's father; Priya and Ashi's grandfather (2012–2014)
  - Ahaan as Baby Soham Deshmukh (2011)
- Shruti Kanwar as Ovi Deshmukh – Archana and Manav's elder daughter; Soham and Tejaswini's sister; Jr. Sachin and Purvi's adopted sister; Arjun's ex-wife; Pia's mother (2011–2014)
- Mrinalini Tyagi as Tejaswini "Teju" Deshmukh – Archana and Manav's younger daughter; Ovi and Soham's sister; Jr. Sachin and Purvi's adopted sister; Sunny's former love interest (2011–2014)
- Puru Chibber / Anubhav Krishna Srivastava as Jr. Sachin "Sachu" Deshmukh – Sachin and Shravani's son; Archana and Manav's adopted son; Soham, Ovi, Tejaswini and Purvi's adopted brother; Gauri's ex-fiancé; Neena's husband; Gaurav and Pushti's father (2011—2012) / (2012–2014)
  - Harsh Katara as Child Jr. Sachin Deshmukh (2011)
- Mansi Sharma as Neena Deshmukh – Jr. Sachin's wife; Gaurav and Pushti's mother (2013–2014)
- Nishant Raghuwanshi as Prashant Deshmukh – Soham's elder son; Ankita and Mansi's brother; Pranav and Sonali's half-brother (2013–2014)
- Akash Nath as Pranav Deshmukh – Soham and Ratna's son; Sonali's brother; Ankita, Prashant and Mansi's half-brother (2013–2014)
- Kreesha Shah as Sonali "Sonu" Deshmukh – Soham and Ratna's daughter; Pranav's sister; Ankita, Prashant and Mansi's half-sister (2013–2014)
- Niveen A Ramani as Gaurav Deshmukh – Jr. Sachin and Neena's son; Pushti's brother (2013–2014)
- Jinal Jain as Pushti Deshmukh – Jr. Sachin and Neena's daughter; Gaurav's sister (2013–2014)

Karanjkar family

- Savita Prabhune as Sulochana Karanjkar – Manohar's widow; Vinod, Archana, Varsha and Vaishali's mother; Poornima, Ruchita, Aniket, Soham, Ovi and Tejaswini's grandmother; Jr. Sachin and Purvi's adoptive grandmother; Pia, Ankita, Prashant, Mansi, Pranav and Sonali's great-grandmother; Pari, Gaurav and Pushti's adoptive great-grandmother; Priya and Ashi's great-great-grandmother (2009–2014)
- Ajay Rohila / Kishori Govind Mahabole as Manohar Karanjkar – Sulochana's husband; Vinod, Archana, Varsha and Vaishali's father; Poornima, Ruchita, Aniket, Soham, Ovi and Tejaswini's grandfather; Jr. Sachin and Purvi's adoptive grandfather; Pia, Ankita, Prashant, Mansi, Pranav and Sonali's great-grandfather; Pari, Gaurav and Pushti's adoptive great-grandfather; Priya and Ashi's great-great-grandfather (2009) / (2009–2011)
- Parag Tyagi as Vinod Karanjkar – Sulochana and Manohar's son; Archana, Varsha and Vaishali's brother; Manjusha's husband; Poornima and Ruchita's father (2009–2013)
- Priya Marathe as Varsha "Varshu" Karanjkar (alias Jhumri Singh) – Sulochana and Manohar's second daughter; Vinod, Archana and Vaishali's sister; Satish's ex-wife; Balan's fake wife; Soham's foster mother (2009–2013)
- Prarthana Behere / Madhumita Das as Vaishali "Vaishu" Karanjkar – Sulochana and Manohar's youngest daughter; Vinod, Archana and Varsha's sister; Dharmesh's ex-wife; Aniket's mother; Varun's step-mother (2009–2011) / (2011–2012)
- Swati Anand as Manjusha "Manju" Lokhande Karanjkar – Rasika's daughter; Ajit's sister; Vinod's wife; Poornima and Ruchita's mother (2009–2013)
- Meghna Kinare / Shivani Tomar as Ruchita "Ruchi" Karanjkar – Manjusha and Vinod's younger daughter; Poornima's sister (2011) / (2013)

Lokhande family

- Yamini Thakur as Vandita "Vandu" Deshmukh Lokhande – Savita and Damodar's daughter; Manav and Sachin's sister; Ajit's wife; Munni's mother (2009–2013)
- Prabhat Bhattacharya / Pankaj Vishnu as Ajit Lokhande – Rasika's son; Manjusha's brother; Vandita's husband; Munni's father (2009–2011, 2013)
- Smita Oak as Rasika Lokhande – Manjusha and Ajit's mother; Poornima; Ruchita and Munni's grandmother (2009–2012)

Deshpande family

- Anurag Sharma as Satish Deshpande – Mohan and Bhavna's son; Varsha's ex-husband (2009–2011)
- Shalini Arora as Bhavna Deshpande – Mohan's wife; Satish's mother (2009–2011)
- Pawan Mahendru as Mohan Deshpande – Bhavna's husband; Satish's father (2009–2011)

Mahadik family

- Pooja Pihal as Shravani Mahadik – Girish's daughter; Sachin's fiancée; Jr. Sachin's mother; Gaurav and Pushti's grandmother (2009–2011)
- Anil Mishra as Girish Mahadik – Shravani's father; Jr. Sachin's grandfather; Gaurav and Pushti's great-grandfather (2009–2011)

Jaipuriwala family

- Sumeet Arora as Dharmesh Jaipurwala – Meena's son; Madhuri and Vaishali's ex-husband; Varun and Aniket's father (2010–2011)
- Sujata Vaishnav as Meena Jaipurwala – Dharmesh's mother; Varu and Aniket's grandmother (2010–2011)
- Divjot Sabarwal as Madhuri – Dhamresh's ex-wife; Varun's mother (2011)
- Karan Hukku as Varun Jaipurwala – Madhuri and Dharmesh's son; Aniket's half-brother (2011)
- Rahul Tandon as Aniket Jaipurwala – Vaishali and Dharmesh's son; Varun's half-brother (2012–2013)

Kirloskar family

- Naved Aslam as Digvijay "DK" Kirloskar – Manav's former boss and friend; Ashna's widower; Arjun's father; Pari and Pia's grandfather (2011–2013)
- Manasi Salvi as Ashna Kirloskar – Digvijay's wife; Arjun's mother; Pari and Pia's grandmother (2011)
- Ruhee Bagga as Pari "Ahaana" Kirloskar – Purvi and Arjun's daughter; Pia's half-sister; Naren's ex-wife (2013–2014)
  - Hetal Gada as Child Pari Kirloskar (2013)
- Karishma Sharma as Pia Kirloskar – Ovi and Arjun's daughter; Purvi's step-daughter; Pari's half-sister (2014)

Mittal family

- Jia Mustafa as Poornima "Punni" Karanjkar Mittal – Manjusha and Vinod's elder daughter; Ruchita's sister; Malik's wife (2011—2013)
- Krunal Pandit as Malik Mittal – Poornima's husband (2011–2013)

Dutt family

- Shakti Arora as Dr. Onir Dutt – Purvi's ex-husband; Shalini's husband (2012–2013)
- Menaka Lalwani as Shalini Dutt – Onir's second wife (2013)

Khandeshi family

- Karan Sharma as Sunny Khandeshi – Mukesh and Snehlata's younger son; Jignesh's brother; Tejaswini's former love interest (2012–2013)
- Ketki Dave as Snehlata Khandeshi – Mukesh's wife; Jignesh and Sunny's mother (2012–2013)
- Mark Parakh as Jignesh Khandeshi – Mukesh and Snehlata's elder son; Sunny's brother (2012–2013)

Shahane family

- Priyanka Kandwal as Dr. Gauri Shahane – Umesh and Rajni's daughter; Atul's sister; Jr. Sachin's ex-fianceé; Soham's former love interest (2013)
- Sanjay Bhatia as Umesh Shahane – Rajni's husband; Gauri and Atul's father (2013)
- Amita Desai as Rajni Shahane – Umesh's wife; Gauri and Atul's mother (2013)
- Ahmad Harhash as Atul Shahane – Umesh and Rajni's son; Gauri's brother (2013)

Karmarkar family

- Sheeba Chadha as Rushali Karmarkar – Shrish's wife; Naren and Raunak's mother; Priya and Ashi's grandmother (2013–2014)
- Vikrant Chaturvedi as Shirish Karmarkar – Sunanda's brother; Rushali's husband; Naren and Raunak's father; Priya and Ashi's grandfather (2013–2014)
- Sumukhi Pendse as Sunanda Karmarkar – Shirish's sister (2013–2014)
- Ranjeet Singh as Raunak Karmarkar – Rushali and Shirish's younger son; Naren's brother; Kinnari's husband; Priya's father (2013–2014)
- Minal Mogam as Kinnari Nadkarni Karmarkar – Raunak's wife (2013–2014)
- Angel as Ashi Karmarkar – Ankita and Naren's daughter; Pari's foster daughter (2014)

Kamble family

- Aparna Dixit as Mansi "Manu" Deshmukh Kamble – Soham's second daughter; Ankita and Prashant's sister; Pranav and Sonali's half-sister; Shashank's wife; Priya's mother (2013–2014)
- Manish Naggdev as Shashank Kamble – Mansi's husband; Priya's step-father (2013–2014)
- Unknown as Priya Kamble – Mansi and Raunak's daughter; Shashank's step-daughter (2014)
- Vandana Mittal as Mrs. Kamble – Shashank's mother; Priya's step-grandmother (2013–2014)

Others

- Eva Shirali as Swati Rane – Jaywant's sister (2009–2010)
- Amit Sarin as Ashwin Sagar – Satish's cousin; Varsha's former lover; Urmila's husband (2009–2010)
- Ashlesha Sawant as Urmila Sagar – Ashwin's wife (2009–2010)
- Mahesh Shetty as Jaywant Rane – Swati's brother; Archana's proposed groom (2010)
- Neha Sehgal as Ria Gupta – Manav's assistant (2010–2011)
- Savita Shivaskar as Sundari – Maidservant in the Deshmukh household (2011–2014)
- Mandar Jadhav as Vinay Apte – Purvi's colleague and ex-fiancé (2012–2013)
- Karan Suchak as Shekhar Gupta – Lawyer; Naren's friend; Pari's ex-fiancé (2013–2014)
- Mukul Harish as Ranvijay – Gopal and Neelima's younger son; Vishnu's brother; Vaishnavi's father (2014)
- Riya Raval as Vaishnavi aka Vaishu – Ranvijay's daughter; Ankita's foster daughter; Ashi's friend (2014)
- Bhanujeet Sudan as Rishabh Kapoor – A businessman; Sonia's former husband and murderer; (2013–2014)
- Kali Prasad Mukherjee / Abhay Bhargava as Balan Lala Singh – Varsha's fake husband; Soham's foster father (2012–2013) / (2013–2014)
- Tanvi Thakkar as Rashmi (2009–2010)
- Syed Zafar Ali as Dr. Agarwal (2013)
- Irfan Razaa Khan as Prakash (2010)
- Aryan Prajapati as Nikhil (2013)
- Anuradha Namdar as Charulata Mehta (2012–2013)
- Mohit Sehgal as Pradeep Saini (2013)
- Manish Khanna as Kashinath Sharma (2013)
- Suman Shastri Kant as Kinshuk Banerjee (2013)

== Production ==
=== Casting ===
Sushant Singh Rajput who was playing the parallel lead in Kis Desh Mein Hai Meraa Dil of StarPlus was cast as Manav. Zee TV did not accept him for casting as Manav as he was a parallel lead of the show in their rival channel. But Producer Ekta Kapoor convinced the channel to accept him. In November 2011 Rajput quit the series and was replaced by Hiten Tejwani. However, during the final of the series on 25 October 2014, Tejwani paved way for Rajput who appeared in the final episode as Manav.

=== Schedule ===
The show's time slot was changed from 21:00 to 18:30 on 15 April 2014 and the 21:00 slot was taken by Kumkum Bhagya, also produced by Ekta Kapoor.

=== Broadcast ===
In India, the series was re-aired on Zee TV from 3 September 3, 2020, due to popular demand.In late 2018 and later in 2020, after the death of Sushant Singh Rajput, who starred in the series.

== Reception ==
Around late 2008, producer Ekta Kapoor and her production house Balaji Telefilms declined when the ratings and popularity of all her hit soaps of the 2000s decreased and were axed and also when newly launched ones performed poorly. Since then most channels did not accept her to work. It was due to the chance given by Zee TV for this series, the career of Kapoor and her production house was revived when it became one of the top-rated Hindi television programs.

=== Ratings ===
Pavitra Rishta premiered on June 1, 2009, registering a steady opening Television Rating Point (TRP) of 2.7. Driven by widespread critical acclaim for its authentic middle-class Maharashtrian backdrop and the distinct on-screen chemistry between its lead actors, Sushant Singh Rajput and Ankita Lokhande, the show's viewership witnessed an aggressive upward trajectory ranging from 4.5 to 5.2 TRP range over its introductory year, regularly driving Zee TV to the number one position across the prime-time slot.

During its peak narrative phases between late 2010 and early 2011, which focused on the central couple's intense family tribulations, financial hardships, and marital separations, the show recorded a 7.0 mark. It secured an all-time high weekly average of 7.1 TRP, while its highest-rated single-day episode reached a peak of 7.6 TRP. In June 2011, the show gave a tough competition to rival network Colors' flagship drama Balika Vadhu, tracking at a 4.83 TVR. Even as the show crossed its third year on-air, the show maintained a stable 3.4 TRP in late January 2013.

To sustain audience engagement and refresh the long-running storytelling arcs, the production house introduced a major 4-year leap in 2011 whereas the leads embrace parenthood and in December 2011, first 18-year generation leap was taken to shift the primary focus onto the couple's children (Purvi and Arjun). While this narrative shift initially managed to stabilize numbers, the subsequent departure of lead actor Sushant Singh Rajput to pursue a career in mainstream cinema caused the show to face gradual urban audience fatigue despite a recasting under Hiten Tejwani, with 2012 metrics dipping slightly to a 2.7 TRP. At the same year, the narrative underwent a 6-month leap shifting to Kolkata.

A later, massive second 20-year generation leap implemented in October 2013 to introduce grandchildren failed to re-engage the core demographic, resulting in a noticeable decline to a 2.1 TRP by early 2014. By mid-2014, amidst intensifying prime-time competition across rival channels, the daily soap plunged to its lifetime low of 0.9 TRP, prompting Zee TV to shift the program out of its flagship prime-time block into an early evening 6:30 PM time slot. The show again took a leap of 4-years, before wrapping on October 25, 2014, recovering slightly to register a closing its successful 5- year journey as finale score of 1.2 TRP.

Key TRP Milestones of Pavitra Rishta
Viewership Phase	TRP Rating	Context / Storyline Peak
Opening Episode	2.7	Premiere and introduction of Archana and Manav's families.
All-Time Peak (Weekly Average)	7.1	Marriage revelations, intense family drama, and peak romance.
All-Time Peak (Single Day)	7.6	Major plot twist confrontation episode.
Post-First Generation Leap	3.4	Shift to Arjun and Purvi's storyline; post-Manav recasting transition.
Post-Second Generation Leap	2.1	Introduction of grandchildren; noticeable decline in core urban viewership.
All-Time Low	0.9	Late-stage multi-generational shifts and intense prime-time competition.
Closing Episode	1.2	Grand finale tying up the family saga.

== Reboot series ==
After this rerun received good ratings, they decided to bring a new series. A series titled Pavitra Rishta – It's Never too Late aired on ZEE5 from 15 September 2021 starring Ankita Lokhande reprising her role as Archana and Shaheer Sheikh as Manav.

== Accolades ==
Pavitra Rishta received several awards and nominations. Lokhande and Rajput received multiple awards for their roles Archana and Manav in the Best Actress and Best Actor categories, as has Nadkarni in the Best Negative Actress category and Ekta Kapoor in the Best Serial category.

Year	Award	Category	Recipient	Role	Result	
2009	Indian Telly Awards	Most Popular Actress In A Supporting Role	Savita Prabhune	Sulochana Karanjkar	Won	
2009	Indian Telly Awards	Most Popular Fresh New Face (Female)	Ankita Lokhande	Archana Deshmukh	Nominated	
2009	Indian Telly Awards	Most Popular Actor(Male)	Sushant Singh Rajput	Manav Deshmukh	Nominated	
2009	Indian Telly Awards	Most Popular Daily Serial	Ekta Kapoor	Pavitra Rishta	Nominated	
2010	Seoul International Drama Awards	Special Jury Award	Ekta Kapoor	Producer	Won	
2010	Indian Television Academy Awards	Best Actor Popular(Male)	Sushant Singh Rajput	Manav Deshmukh	Won	
2010	Indian Television Academy Awards	GR8 Face Of The Year(Female)	Ankita Lokhande	Archana Deshmukh	Won	
2010	Indian Telly Awards	Most Popular Drama Series	Ekta Kapoor	Pavitra Rishta	Won	
2010	Indian Telly Awards	Best Actress In A Negative Role(Popular)	Usha Nadkarni	Savita Deshmukh	Nominated	
2010	Indian Telly Awards	Best Actress In A Supporting Role(Popular)	Savita Prabhune	Sulochana Karanjkar	Nominated	
2010	Indian Telly Awards	Best Actress In A Lead Role(Popular)	Ankita Lokhande	Archana Deshmukh	Nominated	
2010	Indian Telly Awards	Best Actor In A Lead Role(Popular)	Sushant Singh Rajput	Manav Deshmukh	Nominated	
2010	Indian Telly Awards	Best Daily Serial	Ekta Kapoor	Pavitra Rishta	Nominated	
2010	Indian Telly Awards	Best Continuing TV Programme	Ekta Kapoor	Pavitra Rishta	Nominated	
2010	Indian Telly Awards	Best Story Writer	Rajesh Joshi	Crew	Nominated	
2010	Boroplus Gold Awards	Best TV Show ruling TRP Charts of The Year	Pavitra Rishta Team	Pavitra Rishta	Won	
2010	Boroplus Gold Awards	Best TV Actor(Male)	Sushant Singh Rajput	Manav Damodar Deshmukh	Won	
2010	Boroplus Gold Awards	Best TV Debut(Female)	Ankita Lokhande	Archana Manav Deshmukh	Won	
2010	Boroplus Gold Awards	Best TV Actor for Negative Role (Female)	Usha Nadkarni	Savita Damodar Deshmukh	Won	
2010	BIG Star Entertainment Awards	Most Entertaining TV Actor(Male)	Sushant Singh Rajput	Manav Deshmukh	Won	
2010	BIG Star Entertainment Awards	Most Entertaining TV Actor(Female)	Usha Nadkarni	Savita Deshmukh	Nominated	
2010	BIG Star Entertainment Awards	Most Entertaining Television Show(Fiction)	Ekta Kapoor	Pavitra Rishta	Nominated	
2011	Apsara Awards	Best TV Actor (Female)	Ankita Lokhande	Archana Deshmukh	Won	
2011	BIG Television Awards	Favourite Teekha Character	Usha Nadkarni	Savita Deshmukh	Won	
2011	BIG Television Awards	Favourite Meetha Character	Sushant Singh Rajput	Manav Deshmukh	Won	
2011	BIG Television Awards	Favourite Namkeen Character	Usha Nadkarni	Savita Deshmukh	Nominated	
2011	BIG Television Awards	Favourite Garma Garam Jodi	Sushant Singh Rajput and Ankita Lokhande	Manav and Archana Deshmukh	Nominated	
2011	BIG Television Awards	Favourite Dulara Character(Male)	Sushant Singh Rajput	Manav Deshmukh	Nominated	
2011	BIG Television Awards	Favourite Dulara Character(Female)	Ankita Lokhande	Archana Deshmukh	Nominated	
2011	FICCI Frames Excellence Honours	Best TV Actor(Female)	Ankita Lokhande	Archana Deshmukh	Nominated	
2011	FICCI Frames Excellence Honours	Best TV Actor(Male)	Sushant Singh Rajput	Manav Deshmukh	Won	
2011	FICCI Frames Excellence Honours	Best TV Show (Fiction)	Ekta Kapoor	Pavitra Rishta	Won	
2011	Boroplus Gold Awards	Best Supporting Actor(Female)-Popular	Savita Prabhune	Sulochana Karanjkar	Won	
2011	Boroplus Gold Awards	Best Negative Actor(Female)-Popular	Usha Nadkarni	Savita Deshmukh	Won	
2011	Boroplus Gold Awards	Best TV Actor(Male)-Popular	Sushant Singh Rajput	Manav Deshmukh	Won	
2011	Boroplus Gold Awards	Best TV Actor(Female)-Popular	Ankita Lokhande	Archana Deshmukh	Won	
2011	Boroplus Gold Awards	Best TV Show Of The Year	Ekta Kapoor	Pavitra Rishta	Won	
2011	Boroplus Gold Awards	Best Negative Actor(Female)-Critics	Usha Nadkarni	Savita Deshmukh	Nominated	
2011	Boroplus Gold Awards	Best Supporting Actor(Female)-Critics	Savita Prabhune	Sulochana Karanjkar	Nominated	
2011	Boroplus Gold Awards	Best Celebrity Jodi	Sushant Singh Rajput and Ankita Lokhande	Manav and Archana Deshmukh	Nominated	
2011	Indian Television Academy Awards	The GR8! Laurel For Ensemble Acting 2011	Ekta Kapoor	Pavitra Rishta	Won	
2011	BIG Star Entertainment Awards	Most Entertaining TV Actor(Male)	Sushant Singh Rajput	Manav Deshmukh	Nominated	
2011	BIG Star Entertainment Awards	Most Entertaining TV Actor(Female)	Ankita Lokhande	Archana Deshmukh	Nominated	
2011	BIG Star Entertainment Awards	Most Entertaining Television Show(Fiction)	Ekta Kapoor	Pavitra Rishta	Nominated	
2012	Indian Telly Awards	Best Television Personality (Female)	Ankita Lokhande	Archana Deshmukh	Won	
2012	Indian Telly Awards	Best Actress In A Negative Role(Popular)	Usha Nadkarni	Savita Deshmukh	Nominated	
2012	Indian Telly Awards	Best Actress In A Lead Role(Popular)	Ankita Lokhande	Archana Deshmukh	Nominated	
2012	Indian Telly Awards	Best Actor In A Lead Role(Popular)	Hiten Tejwani	Manav Deshmukh	Nominated	
2012	Indian Telly Awards	Best Onscreen Couple	Sushant Singh Rajput and Ankita Lokhande	Manav and Archana Deshmukh	Nominated	
2012	Indian Telly Awards	Best Daily Serial	Ekta Kapoor	Pavitra Rishta	Nominated	
2012	Indian Telly Awards	Best Continuing TV Programme	Ekta Kapoor	Pavitra Rishta	Nominated	
2012	Indian Telly Awards	Best Drama Series	Ekta Kapoor	Pavitra Rishta	Nominated	
2012	Indian Telly Awards	Best Story Writer	Rajesh Joshi	Crew	Nominated	
2012	Indian Telly Awards	Best Actress In A Negative Role(Jury)	Usha Nadkarni	Savita Deshmukh	Nominated	
2012	Indian Telly Awards	Best Actor In A Negative Role(Jury)	Sumit Arora	Dharmesh Jaipurwala	Nominated	
2012	Boroplus Gold Awards	Best Actor(Female)	Ankita Lokhande	Archana Deshmukh	Nominated	
2012	Boroplus Gold Awards	Stellar Performer Of The Year	Asha Negi	Purvi Deshmukh	Nominated	
2012	Boroplus Gold Awards	Stellar Performer Of The Year	Shakti Arora	Dr. Onir Dutt	Nominated	
2012	Boroplus Gold Awards	Most Stylish Actor Of The Year	Rithwik Dhanjani	Arjun Kirloskar	Nominated	
2012	Boroplus Gold Awards	Best Actress in Negative Role (Critics)	Usha Nadkarni	Savita Deshmukh		
2012	Boroplus Gold Awards	Best Actor(Male)	Hiten Tejwani	Manav Deshmukh	Nominated	
2012	Boroplus Gold Awards	Best Supporting Actor (Female)	Savita Prabhune	Sulochana Karanjkar	Nominated	
2012	Boroplus Gold Awards	Best Negative Actor (Male)	Puru Chibber	Sachin Deshmukh	Nominated	
2012	Boroplus Gold Awards	Gold Debut In A Lead Role (Female)	Asha Negi	Purvi Deshmukh	Nominated	
Best Television Show	Ekta Kapoor	Pavitra Rishta			Nominated	
2012	People's Choice Awards India	Favourite Most Good Looking Onscreen Jodi	Shakti Arora and Asha Negi	Onir and Purvi Dutt	Nominated	Nominated
2012	People's Choice Awards India	Favourite TV Drama	Ekta Kapoor	Pavitra Rishta		Nominated
2013	Indian Telly Awards	Nominated				
2013	Indian Telly Awards	Nominated	Best Make-Up Artist	Abdul Rehman Shaikh	Crew	
2013	Indian Telly Awards	Best Fresh New Face(Female)	Asha Negi	Purvi Dutt	Nominated	
2013	Indian Telly Awards	Best Daily Serial	Ekta Kapoor	Pavitra Rishta	Nominated	
2013	Indian Telly Awards	Best Continuing TV Programme	Ekta Kapoor	Pavitra Rishta	Nominated	
2013	Boroplus Gold Awards	Best Actress In Comic Role (Critics)	Usha Nadkarni	Savita Deshmukh	Won	
2013	Boroplus Gold Awards	Gold Producer’s Honour for Completing 1000 episodes	Ekta Kapoor	Pavitra Rishta	Won	
2013	Boroplus Gold Awards	Best Actress (Popular)	Ankita Lokhande	Archana Deshmukh	Nominated	
2013	Boroplus Gold Awards	Most Stylish Actress Of The Year	Asha Negi	Purvi Dutt	Nominated	
2013	Boroplus Gold Awards	Best Actor (Critics)	Shakti Arora	Dr Onir Dutt	Nominated	
2013	Boroplus Gold Awards	Best TV Show (Fiction)	Ekta Kapoor	Pavitra Rishta	Nominated	
2014	Star Guild Awards	Best Actress in Leading Role	Ankita Lokhande	Ankita Mahatre	Won	
2014	Star Guild Awards	Best Continuing Show of The Year	Ekta Kapoor	Pavitra Rishta	Nominated	
2014	Boroplus Gold Awards	Best Actress In Comic Role (Popular)	Usha Nadkarni	Savita Deshmukh	Nominated	
2014	Boroplus Gold Awards	Best Actor In Comic Role (Popular)	Karan Mehra	Naren Karmarkar	Nominated	
2014	Boroplus Gold Awards	Best Actress (Critics)	Ankita Lokhande	Ankita Karmarkar	Nominated	
