= Shakti Arora =

Indian television actor (born 1986)

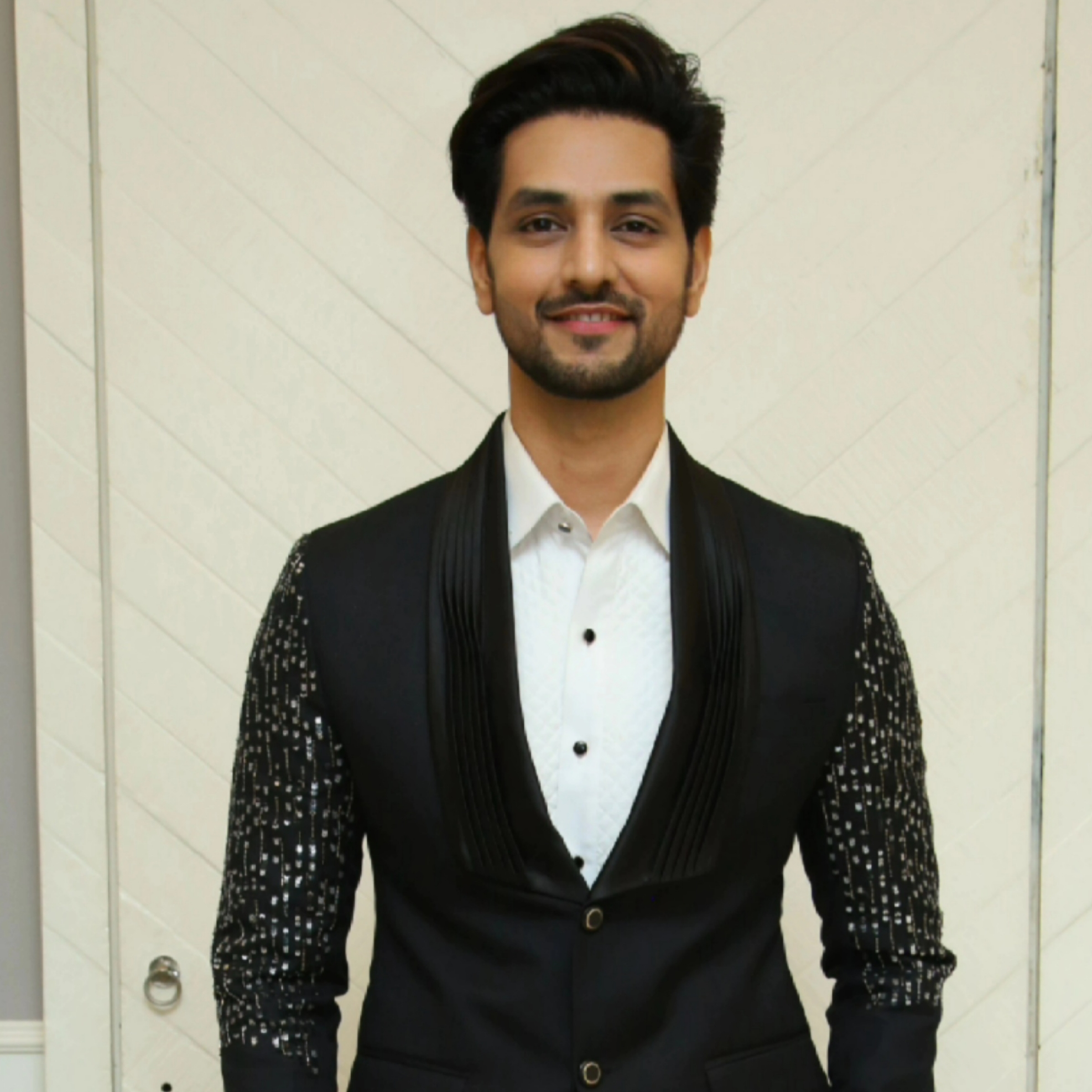
- Arora in 2020
- Born: 16 May 1986 (age 40)
- Occupation: Actor and Entrepreneur
- Years active: 2006–present
- Known for: Meri Aashiqui Tum Se Hi; Kundali Bhagya; Ghum Hai Kisikey Pyaar Meiin
- Spouse: Neha Saxena (m. 2018)

Shakti Arora (born 16 May 1986) is an Indian television actor known for his work in Hindi-language television. He is best known for his portrayal of Ranveer Vaghela in Meri Aashiqui Tum Se Hi, Dr. Kunal Malhotra in Silsila Badalte Rishton Ka, Arjun Sooryavanshi in Kundali Bhagya and Ishaan Bhonsle in Ghum Hai Kisikey Pyaar Meiin.

== Career ==
=== Initial days and critical appreciation (2006–2014) ===
Arora made his television debut in 2006 with Ssshhhh...Phir Koi Hai and then played Kamran in Sony SAB's Left Right Left that year. In 2007, he signed Star Plus's medical based series Dill Mill Gaye for the supporting role of Sumit.

After a two-year break, he was back to television in 2009 as Jigar Thakkar in Baa Bahoo Aur Baby. In 2010, he joined Star Plus's Tere Liye as Taposh Banerjee. In 2011, he was roped in as Mukul in Zee TV's Agle Janam Mohe Bitiya Hi Kijo and as Angad Purohit in Sanskaar Laxmi.

Arora gained appreciation for his performance as Onir Dutt, a doctor in one of Zee TV's soap opera, Pavitra Rishta, which he did from 2012 to 2013. In 2012, he also hosted Gyaan Guru and Gumrah: End of Innocence.

In 2013, he hosted Science With BrainCafe and acted in Yeh Hai Aashiqui as Mayank opposite Kapoor and in MTV Webbed as Kavish Mehta apart from a special cameo in Star Plus's Yeh Hai Mohabbatein. His first project of 2014 was playing Avinash opposite Charlie Chauhan in Zing's Pyaar Tune Kya Kiya.

=== Establishment as a leading actor (2014–present) ===
Shakti in 2014

Arora achieved his first leading role in June 2014, as Ranveer Vaghela, a successful business tycoon in Colors TV's Meri Aashiqui Tum Se Hi opposite Radhika Madan and later also played Ranveer's twin brother Milan Vaghela in it. He earned several awards and nomination for the show, before it ended in February 2016. Simultaneously, he also took part in the dance reality show Nach Baliye 7 in 2015.

Arora additionally gave guest appearances in Jhalak Dikhhla Jaa 7 and Krishnadasi as his character Ranveer Vaghela from Meri Aashiqui Tum Se Hi. He was a guest in Comedy Nights Bachao and narrated Colors TV's Kasam Tere Pyaar Ki.

In 2016, he contested in season 2 of Box Cricket League. That year he also participated in the dance reality show Jhalak Dikhhla Jaa 8 as a contestant. He then hosted Man Mein Hai Visshwas 2.

In June 2018, Arora begun starring alongside Drashti Dhami and Aditi Dev Sharma in Colors TV's Silsila Badalte Rishton Ka as pediatrician Kunal Malhotra. He quit the show in 2019. He next appeared in Colors TV's cooking show Kitchen Champion 5.

In June 2022, he replaced Dheeraj Dhoopar as lead Karan Luthra in Zee TV's Kundali Bhagya. However, he quit the series in March 2023 owing to a generation leap in the show and to explore different projects. From June 2023 to June 2024, he portrayed Ishaan Bhosale in Star Plus's Ghum Hai Kisikey Pyaar Meiin opposite Bhavika Sharma. His character was written out of the show after a time leap.

== Filmography ==
=== Television ===
Year	Title	Role	Notes	Ref.
2006–2009	Ssshhhh...Phir Koi Hai	Various		
2006	Left Right Left	Kamran		
2007	Dill Mill Gayye	Sumit		
2009	Baa Bahoo Aur Baby	Jigar Thakkar		
2010	Tere Liye	Taposh Banerjee		
2011	Agle Janam Mohe Bitiya Hi Kijo	Mukul		
2011	Sanskaar Laxmi	Angad Purohit		
2012–2013	Pavitra Rishta	Dr. Onir Dutt		
2012	Gyaan Guru	Host		
2012	Gumrah: End of Innocence	Rambo		
2013–2014	Rasoi Ki Rani	Contestant		
2013	Science with Brain Café	Contestant		
2013	Yeh Hai Aashiqui	Mayank		
2013	MTV Webbed	Kavish Mehra		
2013	Yeh Hai Mohabbatein	Vyom Chauhan		
2014	Pyaar Tune Kya Kiya	Avinash		
2014–2016	Meri Aashiqui Tum Se Hi	Ranveer Vaghela/Milan Vaghela		
2015	Nach Baliye 7	Contestant	12th place	
2016	Jhalak Dikhhla Jaa 9	Contestant	8th place	
2016	Man Mein Hai Visshwas 2	Host		
2017	Cinta di Pangkuan Himalaya	Sakti		
2018–2019	Silsila Badalte Rishton Ka	Dr. Kunal Malhotra		
2022–2023	Kundali Bhagya	Karan Luthra / Arjun Sooryavanshi		
2023–2024	Ghum Hai Kisikey Pyaar Meiin	Ishaan Bhosale		

==== Special appearances ====
Year	Title	Role	Ref.
2014	Jhalak Dikhhla Jaa 7	Ranveer Vaghela	
2016	Box Cricket League 2	Himself	
2016	Krishnadasi	Ranveer Vaghela	
2016	Comedy Nights Bachao	Ranveer Vaghela	
2016	Kasam Tere Pyaar Ki	Narrator	
2017	Yeh Rishta Kya Kehlata Hai	Himself	
2019	Kitchen Champion 5	Himself	
2024	Udne Ki Aasha	Ishaan Bhosale	

=== Films ===
Year	Title	Role	Language	Notes
2018	Arwah Tumbal Nyai: Part Arwah	Shakti	Indonesian	
2020	Tera Yaar Hu Main	Sahil	Hindi	Short film

== Awards and nominations ==
Year	Award	Category	Work	Result
2014	Indian Television Academy Awards	GR8! Performer of the Year - Male	Meri Aashiqui Tum Se Hi	Nominated
2015	Indian Telly Awards	Best On-screen Couple	Meri Aashiqui Tum Se Hi	Nominated
2015	Indian Telly Awards	Best Actor in Lead role	Meri Aashiqui Tum Se Hi	Nominated
2015	Indian Television Academy Awards	Youth Icon of the Year	Meri Aashiqui Tum Se Hi	Won
2019	Indian Telly Awards	Best Actor In Lead Role (Male)	Silsila Badalte Rishton Ka	Nominated
2020	Gold Glam and Style Awards	Stylish Influencer (Male)	—N/a	Won

== See also ==
- List of Indian television actors
- List of Indian actors
