= Radhika Madan =

Indian actress (born 1995)

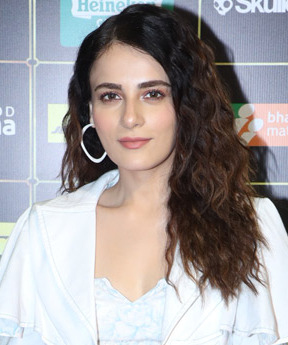
- Madan in 2023
- Born: 1 May 1995 (age 31); Delhi, India
- Education: Jesus and Mary College
- Occupation: Actress
- Years active: 2014–present

Radhika Madan (born 1 May 1995) is an Indian actress who works primarily in Hindi films and television. Madan is a recipient of a Screen Award and a Filmfare OTT Award, and was featured by Forbes India in their 30 Under 30 list of 2024.

After graduating from Jesus and Mary College, she began her acting career with her breakthrough role in the television soap opera Meri Aashiqui Tum Se Hi (2014–2016). Madan made her film debut with Vishal Bhardwaj's drama Pataakha (2018), winning the Screen Award for Best Female Debut. She then featured in Mard Ko Dard Nahi Hota (2018), Angrezi Medium (2020), and Shiddat (2021). She won a Filmfare OTT Award for the anthology film Ray (2021) and has since received praise for starring in the crime drama series Saas, Bahu Aur Flamingo (2023).

== Early life ==
Madan was born on 1 May 1995 in Delhi. Madan completed her schooling from Delhi Public School, Mathura Road, New Delhi, and did her graduation in Bachelor’s of Commerce from Jesus and Mary College, University of Delhi, New Delhi.

Madan turned vegan in 2023 and has been part of PETA India's "try vegan" campaign.

== Career ==
=== Television career (2014–2017) ===
Hailing from Delhi, Madan started her career by making her acting debut in the daily soap opera TV series Meri Aashiqui Tum Se Hi on Colors TV. She played the female lead Ishaani Vaghela opposite Shakti Arora, that earned her massive popularity. The series became one of the most famous shows of Colors TV, airing for over 400 episodes from June 2014 to February 2016.

While busy in shooting for Meri Aashiqui Tum Se Hi, Madan also simultaneously participated in Colors TV's dance reality show Jhalak Dikhhla Jaa 8 in 2015. In 2017, Madan appeared alongside Shakti Arora in the Indonesian television series Cinta di Pangkuan Himalaya.

=== Expansion to films (2018–2022) ===
Madan quit television to make her feature film debut in Vishal Bhardwaj's drama Pataakha (2018) alongside Sanya Malhotra. Based on the short story Do Behnen by Charan Singh Pathik, which revolved around two sisters in Rajasthan who are always on conflict. The story was based on the wives of Pathik's brothers, and for preparation, both Madan and Malhotra met the real women for the dialect and the character's nuances. For the preparation, both Malhotra and Madan stayed in Ronsi village near Jaipur and learned the Rajasthani dialect; they also got accustomed with milking buffaloes, thatching roofs, plastering the walls with dung and walking for long distances while balancing matkas full of water on their head and one around their waist. They also had to put on 10 kg (22 lb) of weight. Raja Sen wrote in his review, "Radhika Madan positively shines in this bossy role, unwavering in dialect and determination."

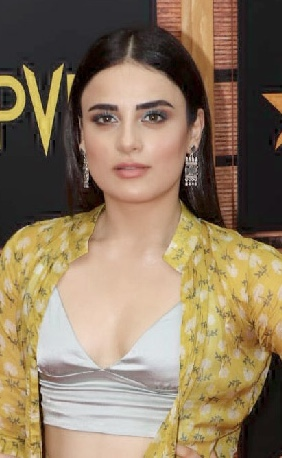
Madan promoting Mard Ko Dard Nahi Hota

In 2019, Madan was cast in Vasan Bala's action comedy Mard Ko Dard Nahi Hota with newcomer Abhimanyu Dassani. It premiered in the Midnight Madness section of the 2018 Toronto International Film Festival, where it won the People's Choice Award: Midnight Madness. The film was also screened at the 2018 MAMI Film Festival. Madan mentioned that she was auditioning for Laila Majnu (2018) when got to know about Mard Ko Dard Nahi Hota and chose the latter film because of its "uniqueness". She performed all the stunts herself and watched several classic action films for days to famliarise herself with the genre. She was also injured while undergoing physical training. Pradeep Menon of Firstpost called her a "delight as Supri" and noted that Madan "manages to make it work by sheer will and talent" despite the character having an "inconsistent treatment". He further said that she "sparkles in the action sequences."

In 2020, Madan appeared in Homi Adajania's comedy-drama Angrezi Medium with Irrfan Khan and Kareena Kapoor, which was Khan's last film before his death in April 2020. Anupama Chopra called her an "absolute natural" in the role. Writing that she "captures the unforced innocence of a 17-year-old, desperate to get out of her small town and see the world."

In 2021, Madan did a variety of four projects. She made her entry into web series with her performances as Divya Didi in Ray and Avani Rajvansh in Feels Like Ishq, both of which earned critical praise. She also worked in the music video Ni Jana, a single by Jasleen Royal. Her only film in 2021 was released on Disney+ Hotstar. It was Kunal Deshmukh's romance film Shiddat with Sunny Kaushal. In 2022, she was seen in a guest appearance in Netflix neo-noir crime comedy thriller film Monica, O My Darling.

=== Career progression (2023–present) ===
In 2023, her first release came with Vishal Bhardwaj's production and his son Aasmaan's directorial debut crime thriller film Kuttey which was released threatically with mixed to positive reviews from critics. Sukanya Verma of Rediff wrote, "Radhika's candour stays true to Kuttey's unhinged ways". Madan next appeared as a gully cricketer in Kacchey Limbu with Rajat Barmecha and Ayush Mehra. India Today noted, "Madan has outdone herself, yet again. She’s successfully proved why filmmakers and audience are looking at her as a bankable actor." She then appeared in Adajania's web series Saas, Bahu Aur Flamingo.

Madan will next play the titular character in Sudhanshu Saria's Sanaa. The film will have its world premiere at the Tallinn Black Nights Film Festival in November 2022. She completed shooting for the remake of Tamil film Soorarai Pottru, titled Sarfira, alongside Akshay Kumar and Paresh Rawal, which released on July 12, 2024. Madan also started filming for Dinesh Vijan's social thriller film with Nimrat Kaur in September 2022. The film, titled Sajini Shinde Ka Viral Video, released on 27 October 2023.

== Media image ==
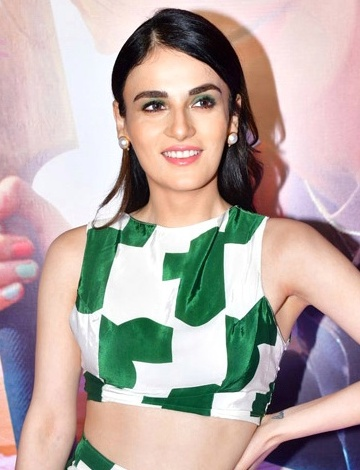
Madan in 2023

Mayukh Majumdar of Filmfare termed her as "a breath of fresh air". On her character prep, Madan said, "‘I give my 100 per cent in my prep because that allows me to give 100 per cent to the character on screen. I don’t like to be in-between in anything." She ranked 24th in Eastern Eye's "Sexiest Asian Women" list of 2015. Madan is a celebrity endorser for several brands and products, including Glow & Lovely and Lay's. In 2023, she received several backlash for her comment on the work culture of the television industry. In 2024, Madan was featured by Forbes India in their 30 Under 30 list.

== Filmography ==
=== Films ===
Key
| † | Denotes films that have not yet been released |

| Year | Title | Role | Notes | Ref. |
|---|---|---|---|---|
| 2018 | Pataakha | Champa Kumari | | |
| 2019 | Mard Ko Dard Nahi Hota | Supriya/Supri | | |
| 2020 | Angrezi Medium | Tarika Bansal | | |
| 2021 | Shiddat | Kartika Singh | | |
| 2022 | Monica, O My Darling | Supriya | Cameo appearance | |
| 2022 | Sanaa | Sanaa | | |
| 2023 | Kuttey | Lovely Khobre | | |
| 2023 | Kacchey Limbu | Aditi Nath | | |
| 2023 | Sajini Shinde Ka Viral Video | Sajini Shinde | | |
| 2024 | Sarfira | Rani | | |
| 2024 | Jigra | Herself | Cameo appearance | |
| 2026 | Subedaar | Shyama Maurya | | |
| 2026 | Lust Stories 3 | Sailee | Segment: "Quarrelling ex-lovers" | |
| TBA | Rumi Ki Sharafat † | Rumi | Completed | |

=== Television ===
| Year | Title | Role | Notes | Ref. |
|---|---|---|---|---|
| 2014–2016 | Meri Aashiqui Tum Se Hi | Ishaani Joshi Vaghela | | |
| 2015 | Jhalak Dikhhla Jaa 8 | Contestant | 14th place | |
| 2017 | Cinta di Pangkuan Himalaya | Sarah | | |
| 2021 | Ray | Divya Didi | Segment: "Spotlight" | |
| 2021 | Feels Like Ishq | Avani Rajvansh | Episode: "Save The Da(y)te" | |
| 2023 | Saas, Bahu Aur Flamingo | Shanta | | |
| | | TBA | | |

=== Music video appearances ===
| Year | Title | Singer(s) | Ref. |
|---|---|---|---|
| 2019 | "Ni Jana" | Jasleen Royal, Alibi Rafeon | |
| 2021 | "Sahiba" | Jasleen Royal, Stebin Ben | |

== Accolades ==
List of awards and nominations received by Radhika Madan
| Year | Award | Category | Work | Result | Ref. |
|---|---|---|---|---|---|
| 2015 | Gold Awards | Debut in a Lead Role - Female | Meri Aashiqui Tum Se Hi | Won | |
| 2015 | Indian Television Academy Awards | Best Newcomer - Female | Meri Aashiqui Tum Se Hi | Won | |
| 2015 | Indian Telly Awards | Fresh New Face - Female | Meri Aashiqui Tum Se Hi | Won | |
| 2015 | Indian Telly Awards | Best Onscreen Couple | Meri Aashiqui Tum Se Hi | Nominated | |
| 2018 | Star Screen Awards | Most Promising Newcomer – Female | Pataakha | Won | |
| 2019 | Zee Cine Awards | Best Female Debut | Pataakha | Nominated | |
| 2019 | 64th Filmfare Awards | Best Female Debut | Pataakha | Nominated | |
| 2019 | 64th Filmfare Awards | Best Actress (Critics) | Pataakha | Nominated | |
| 2020 | 65th Filmfare Awards | Best Actress (Critics) | Mard Ko Dard Nahi Hota | Nominated | |
| 2021 | Filmfare OTT Awards | Best Supporting Actress in a Web Original Film | Ray | Won | |
| 2022 | IIFA Awards | Best Supporting Actress | Angrezi Medium | Nominated | |
| 2022 | Pinkvilla Style Icons Awards | Super Stylish Maverick Star | —N/a | Won | |
| 2023 | Bollywood Hungama Style Icons | Most Stylish Breakthrough Talent (Female) | —N/a | Won | |
| 2023 | UK Asian Film Festival | Best Actor - Female | Sanaa | Won | |
| 2023 | 2023 Filmfare OTT Awards | Best Supporting Actress (Drama Series) | Saas, Bahu Aur Flamingo | Nominated | |
| 2023 | Indian Television Academy Awards | Best Actress in an Original Film | Kacchey Limbu | Won | |
| 2024 | Iconic Gold Awards | Best Actress of the Year - Web Series | Saas, Bahu Aur Flamingo | Won | |
| 2024 | Bollywood Hungama Style Icons | Most Stylish Versatile Talent of the Year | —N/a | Nominated | |
| 2024 | Bollywood Hungama Style Icons | Most Stylish Style Innovator | —N/a | Won | |

== See also ==
- List of Indian film actresses
