= Tennis Premier League =

Professional tennis league in India

- Most recent season or competition: 2025 Tennis Premier League
- Sport: Tennis
- Founded: 2018
- Founder: Kunal Thakkur; Mrunal Jain
- First season: 2018
- Motto: Every Point Matters
- No. of teams: 8
- Country: India
- Continent: Asia
- Most recent champion: GS Delhi Aces (2025)
- Most titles: Hyderabad Strikers (3 titles)
- Broadcasters: India; Sony Sports (TV); JioHotstar (Internet); International; List of broadcasters
- Website: Website

Tennis Premier League, also known as Kia Tennis Premier League due to sponsorship reasons, is an Indian tennis league. It was founded by Kunal Thakkur and Mrunal Jain. The first season of the league was launched in October 2018.

GS Delhi Aces are the current champions after winning against Yash Mumbai Eagles in the 2025 final.

== Background ==
=== Auctions ===
Tennis Premier League has a selection of marquee national and international players, which get selected via auction.

=== Notable names ===
Former tennis player Leander Paes is the owner of a team. Sania Mirza, a former Indian tennis player, and Bollywood actors Arjun Kapoor and Sonu Sood attended the Tennis Premier League Season 5 auction ceremony.

To add to the list, Bollywood actresses Rakul Preet Singh, Sonali Bendre, and Taapsee Pannu are owners of three TPL teams.

During season 3 which was hosted in 2021, Goran Ivanišević, who is Novak Djokovic's coach, was part of TPL. Matthew Ebden, the winner of Wimbledon Championship 2022 men's doubles was a part of the league.

== Format ==
The format of Tennis Premier League sees eight teams being divided into two groups. Each match has four games, men’s and women’s singles, men’s doubles and mixed doubles: each worth 25 points.

== Teams ==
There are total 8 teams in Tennis Premier League, with 24 players battling out for the final title. Each team has its own owner with a mentor, coach, a physio and nutritionist.

Locations of the eight TPL teams

Team	City	Owner	Brand Ambassador	Marquee Player
GS Delhi Aces	Delhi	Vijay Pusdekar	Leander Paes	Billy Harris (tennis)
Kolkata Thunder Blades	Kolkata	Ketan Jain & Rajat Kumar		
Lucknow Blazers	Lucknow	Dharmender Goel	Sonali Bendre	Dalibor Svrčina
Rajasthan Rangers	Jaipur	Ignite Sports		Luciano Darderi
Gujarat Panthers	Ahmedabad	Ramku Patgir	—N/a	Alexandre Müller
Hyderabad Strikers	Hyderabad	Rajdeep Dalmia; Rakul Preet Singh	—N/a	Pedro Martinez (tennis)
Mumbai Royals	Mumbai		—N/a	Damir Džumhur
Gurgaon Grand Slammers	Gurgaon	Gaurav Agarwal	Sania Mirza	Dan Evans (tennis)

== Editions and results ==
Season	Year	Finals			Venue	Ref(s)
Season	Year	Winner	Results	Runner-up	Venue	Ref(s)
1	2018	Sea Hawks		Black Panther	Celebration Sports Club, Mumbai	
2	2019	Pune Warriors	46–44	Punjab Bulls	Celebration Sports Club, Mumbai	
3	2021	Hyderabad Strikers	49–31	Mumbai Leon Army	Celebration Sports Club, Mumbai	
4	2022	Hyderabad Strikers	41–32	Mumbai Leon Army	Balewadi Stadium, Pune	
5	2023	Bengaluru SG Pipers	41–28	Bengal Wizards	Shree Shiv Chhatrapati Sports Complex	
6	2024	Hyderabad Strikers	51–42	Mumbai Eagles	Cricket Club of India, Mumbai	
7	2025	GS Delhi Aces	51-36	Mumbai Eagles	Gujarat University Tennis Stadium, Ahmedabad	

== Broadcasting ==
Territory	Platform
India	Sony Sports Network (TV)
India	JioHotstar (Internet)
Australia	Fox Sports (TV)
Australia	Kayo Sports (Internet)
USA	Willow TV
Canada	Willow TV
Russia	Okko TV
Kazakhstan	Okko TV
Belarus	Okko TV
Europe	Unbeaten Channel
North America	Unbeaten Channel

== See also ==
- Tennis in India
