= Uttaran =

Indian television soap opera

- Genre: Soap opera
- Written by: Ajay; Aseem Arora; Kumar Abhishek
- Story by: Mitali; Shipra Arora
- Directed by: Ravindra Gautam; Nandita Mehra; Nishchal Shome; Santosh Bhatt
- Starring: See below
- Country of origin: India
- Original language: Hindi
- No. of episodes: 1549

Production
- Producers: Kalyan Guha; Rupali Guha; Harsh Dave
- Production location: Mumbai
- Cinematography: Santosh Suryavanshi; Raj Panth
- Production company: Film Farm India

Original release
- Network: Colors TV
- Release: 1 December 2008 – 16 January 2015

Uttaran (transl. Donated items) is an Indian soap opera that aired on many channels from 1 December 2008 to 16 January 2015. The third longest-running Indian television series of Colors TV, it was produced under Film Farm India. It stars Sparsh Khanchandani, Ishita Panchal, Tina Datta, Rashami Desai, Sreejita De, Nandish Sandhu, Vikas Bhalla, Rohit Khurana, Gaurav Chopra, Mrunal Jain, Varun Toorkey and Ajay Singh Chaudhary.

== Plot ==
In Mumbai, Ichcha Bharti is the daughter of a poor widow Damini Bharti, who begins working at Jogi Thakur's mansion as a maid. Jogi's daughter Tapasya befriends Ichcha, and they share a sisterly bond. Sumitra brainwash Tapasya through false theories to see Ichcha differently. Tapasya gets jealous when Divya and Jogi care for Ichcha as their child, unaware that Jogi was responsible for Ichcha's father, Rajendra's death. Sumitra fuels that jealousy hence ruining their friendship.

=== 10 years later ===
Tapasya is a rich spoilt brat. Simplistic Ichcha wants to open a school to give free education to poor kids. Tapasya's parents arrange their daughter's marriage with Veer Singh Bundela, who belongs to a reputed wealthy family. But Tapasya does not show interest towards the wedding as she is in a relationship with Siddharth (Sid). Slowly Veer and Ichcha fall in love and their families agree to their marriage, although Gunvanti never liked Ichcha for her status. Insecure seeing Veer shower Ichcha with expensive gifts, Tapasya fakes a suicide attempt and begs Ichcha to let her marry Veer. Ichcha agrees, and Veer marries Tapasya. That same night, Veer learns the truth, and Tapasya claims Ichcha forced her to marry him, believing she is not right for him. The next day, Veer lashes out at Tapasya in front of her family and forces Ichcha to tell the truth. Meanwhile, his elder brother Vansh, a drug addict, falls for Ichcha because of her caring nature.

Veer, unaware of Vansh's love, tries to divorce Tapasya and marry Ichcha, who tries to distance herself from him. Tapasya tries to get Ichcha killed with the help of Siddharth. Veer saves Ichcha, but not before she gets shot and is hospitalised; Siddharth is then arrested. Tapasya tricks Gunvanti who gets Vansh and Ichcha married. A heartbroken Veer pretends to be happy with Tapasya, while Vansh and Ichcha's marriage suffers. One day, Vansh overhears Siddharth slamming Tapasya for ruining Ichcha's life. Tapasya, however, misleads Vansh, indirectly blaming him for Ichcha's suffering. As a result, he kills himself. Ichcha holds Veer responsible for Vansh's death, and Gunvanti, in turn, blames Ichcha. Veer explains how Tapasya tried to kill Ichcha and is responsible for Vansh's death, by playing a video revealing the day's actions filmed by Siddharth, who wanted to take revenge on Tapasya. Shocked, Jogi disowns her. Ichcha goes to Vrindavan. There, Veer arrives to unite with her, and they get married; the family accepts them.

Tapasya, working to make ends meet at a chawl, meets Raghuvendra Pratap Rathore, who falls for her, but she betrays him in a game of poker. He leaves her due to her disloyalty. She reunites with Jogi and returns to Veer's house, faking pregnancy, but realises that she is pregnant with Raghuvendra's child. Ichcha gives her 15 days to reveal the truth to everyone. Later Ichcha and Tapasya reunite to stop Veer's business partner Satya and Sanchi from harming his family. However Tapasya can't lose Veer so she tries to create a misunderstanding but gets exposed. She delivers Mukta, whom she unintentionally leaves in an orphanage to test Raghuvendra's love. Damini and Ichcha find her on streets. Veer and Ichcha, unaware she is Tapasya's daughter, raise her, and adopt an orphan, Kanha. Raghuvendra accepts Tapasya and they get married and tries to find their daughter. They realise that Tapasya can never become a mother still Raghuvendra supports her. Ichcha delivers a boy but Sumitra and her son Pushkar steal him and bribe the nurse to tell Ichcha that the boy was stillborn.

Raghuvendra bumps into and takes the baby from Pushkar. He and Tapasya adopt the baby, named Yuvraj. Siddharth creates misunderstandings between Raghuvendra and Tapasya and blackmails Tapasya, causing Tapasya to leave Raghuvendra. Heartbroken after reading her letter Raghuvendra tries to find her. Rocky Shah, Vansh's look-alike, enters the Bundela mansion as Vansh and falls for Ichcha. Jogi rescues Ichcha from him, accidentally kills Rocky and is bailed out by Raghuvendra. Veer reveals Gunvanti to be behind all this, and Gunvanti admits to holding a grudge against Ichcha for adopting the two children and not giving birth to her own son, whom she wants as an heir to the family. They later find out that Yuvraj is Ichcha's son and give Mukta to Jogi in exchange for Yuvraj. Pregnant again, Ichcha saves Veer from the cruel Avinash Chatterjee, who attacks him. Veer loses his memory. Ichcha kills Avinash and is jailed for 18 years. Ichcha delivers a girl in prison, and tells Damini to raise the baby, named Meethi.

=== 18 years later ===
Meethi and Mukta are best friends just like their mothers were. Ichcha is released from prison. Kanha, whom Damini raised is a successful CEO, happily married to Surbhi. Yuvraj and Meethi were brought up by Gunvanti and Damini respectively, and Gunvanti instigated him against Ichcha. Sumitra tells Meethi that Ichcha is alive but lies that she ruined Tapasya's life. Initially in denial, Meethi develops a negative opinion of Ichcha when she learns she was in prison for murder. Kanha reveals Ichcha was imprisoned for murder but omits that she killed Avinash to save Veer. Despite Damini and Kanha's efforts, Meethi does not believe them and rejects Ichcha. Sumitra brainwashes Mukta, who grows close to Yuvraj.

Later, he tries to rape Mukta, but Ichcha saves her. Mukta realises she misunderstood her and Meethi. Yuvraj is arrested and finds out Ichcha is his mother. His hatred for her further intensifies as she testifies against him in court, and he is incarcerated for 5 years. Veer, who is still amnesiac, lives with Gunvanti and Amla. Reformed after living in US for years, Tapasya comes back and after lots of struggle restores his memory. Vishnu encourages Meethi, who finally accepts Ichcha.

Eventually, Veer and Ichcha unite. Tapasya reunites with her best friend Ichcha and her family. Meethi marries Vishnu on Ichcha's arrangement. He is actually Avinash's son, Akash Chatterjee, who wants revenge. Mukta discovers his truth and tries to locate the real Vishnu, a humble blue-collar worker for an NGO, to expose Akash. He orders his goons to kidnap and kill Mukta. Fortunately, Raghuvendra saves her. At Akash and Meethi's wedding, Mukta tries to expose him but no one except Sumitra and Raghuvendra believes her.

Meanwhile, Ichcha and Tapasya risk their life to save Mukta from Veer's uncle Tej, who shoots Tapasya. Fatally, Ichcha gets hit by a truck. Before dying, Ichcha donates her heart to Tapasya. Later, Raghuvendra gets the evidence to expose Akash. Surbhi turns out to be Akash's maternal cousin. His mom, Ekadashi, orders him to kill Meethi but he falls in love with her. Meethi leaves the house. Tapasya throws the pregnant Surbhi out.

Surbhi repents for her actions and dies after delivering the child. Kanha forgives her and promises to raise their child. As Vishnu and Mukta love each other, they marry and soon have a son, Manav. Meethi and Akash unite and she is accepted by his family. After undergoing a plastic surgery, Yuvraj returns as Mukta's boss for revenge. He kidnaps her. While saving her, a pregnant Meethi miscarries and disowns Yuvraj before Ekadashi banishes her. She travels to Srinagar.

Caught up in a terrorist attack by Asgar, Meethi slips into a river and is transported by the current across the border to Gilgit. Ashfaq saves her. He falls in love with and helps her in returning to India. He bids her a tearful goodbye. Akash and Meethi unite. She adopts Rani as Nandini is imprisoned because she saved Akash from and murdered his old enemy. Meethi and Akash also adopt Tamanna, whom Rani hates. Sumitra reforms.

Eventually, Sumitra and Damini convince Mukta and Meethi to reconcile, and in the end, reflect the friendship of Ichcha and Tapasya.

== Cast and characters ==
=== Main ===
- Tina Datta as
  - Ichcha Rajendra Bharti/ Ichcha Veer Singh Bundela — Rajendra and Damini's daughter; Veer's wife; Yuvraj and Meethi's mother; Kanha's adoptive mother; Rani step-grandmother; Tamanna's adoptive grandmother (2009–2013) (Dead)
    - Sparsh Khanchandani as child Ichcha (2008–2009)
  - Meethi Akash Chatterjee — Veer and Ichcha's daughter; Yuvraj's sister; Kanha's adoptive sister; Akash's wife; Rani's stepmother; Tamanna's adoptive mother (2012–2015)
- Rashami Desai as Tapasya Jogi Thakur/ Tapasya Raghuvendra Pratap Rathore — Jogi and Divya's daughter; Raghuvendra's wife; Mukta's mother; Manav's grandmother (2009–2014)
  - Ishita Panchal as child Tapasya (2008–2009)
- Sreejita De as Mukta Raghuvendra Pratap Rathore/ Mukta Vishnu Kashyap — Raghuvendra and Tapasya's daughter; Vishnu's wife; Manav's mother (2012–2015)
- Nandish Sandhu as Veer Singh Bundela — Umed and Gunvanti's younger son; Vansh's younger brother; Ichcha's husband; Yuvraj and Meethi's father; Kanha's adoptive father; Rani's step-grandfather; Tamanna's adoptive grandfather (2009–2012)
  - Vikas Bhalla replaced Sandhu as Veer (2012–2013)
- Mrunal Jain as Akash Chatterjee — Avinash and Ekadashi's elder son; Sankrant's elder brother; Meethi's husband; Rani's father; Tamanna's adoptive father (2013–2015)
- Gaurav Chopra as Raghuvendra Pratap Rathore — Malvika and Tapasya's husband; Ambika and Mukta's father; Manav's grandfather (2009–2014)
- Ajay Singh Chaudhary as Vishnu Kashyap — Mukta's husband; Manav's father (2013–2014)

=== Recurring ===
- Sunil Chauhan as Rajendra Bharti — Damini's husband; Ichcha's father; Yuvraj and Meethi's grandfather; Kanha's adoptive grandfather (2009) (Dead)
- Vaishali Thakkar as Damini Rajendra Bharti — Rajendra's wife; Ichcha's mother; Yuvraj and Meethi's grandmother; Kanha's adoptive grandmother (2008–2015)
- Arun Singh Sharma as Pushkar Jaiswal — Sumitra's son; Rohini's husband (2008–2012)
- Akanksha Awasthi as Rohini Jaiswal — Pushkar's wife (2009–2013)
- Pratima Kazmi as Sumitra Devi Jaiswal — Pushkar's mother (2008–2015)
- Ayub Khan as Jogi Thakur — Divya's husband; Tapasya's father; Mukta's grandfather; Manav's great-grandfather (2008–2014)
- Pragati Mehra as Divya Thakur — Jogi's wife; Tapasya's mother; Mukta's grandmother; Manav's great-grandmother (2008–2014)
  - Pyumori Mehta Ghosh replaced Mehra as Divya (2014)
- Shamim Sheikh as Baldev Singh Bundela — Tej and Umed's father; Vansh and Veer's grandfather; Yuvraj and Meethi's great-grandfather; Kanha's adoptive great-grandfather (2009–2013) (Dead)
- Akhil Mishra as Umed Singh Bundela — Gunvanti's husband; Vansh and Veer's father; Baldev's son; Tej's half-brother; Yuvraj and Meethi's grandfather; Kanha's adoptive grandfather (2009–2013)
- Beena Banerjee as Gunvanti Singh Bundela — Umed's wife; Vansh and Veer's mother; Yuvraj and Meethi's grandmother; Kanha's adoptive grandmother (2009–2013)
- Rohit Khurana as
  - Vansh Singh Bundela — Umed and Gunvanti's elder son; Veer's elder brother; Ichcha's ex-husband (2009–2010) (Dead)
  - Rocky Shah — Vansh's doppelganger (2010–2011) (Dead)
- Sourabh Raaj Jain as Yuvraj "Yuvaan" Singh Bundela — Veer and Ichcha's son; Meethi's brother; Kanha's adoptive brother (2012–2013)
  - Bharat Chawda replaced Jain as Yuvraj (2014) (after plastic surgery)
- Raj Singh Verma as Avinash Chatterjee — Ekadashi's husband; Akash and Sankrant's father; Rani's grandfather; Tamanna's adoptive grandfather (2011–2012) (Dead)
- Kruttika Desai Khan as Ekadashi Chatterjee — Avinash's wife; Akash and Sankrant's mother; Rani's grandmother; Tamanna's adoptive grandmother (2012–2015)
- Varun Toorkey as Sankrant Chatterjee — Avinash and Ekadashi's younger son; Akash's younger brother; Ambika's husband (2013–2015)
- Vividha Kirti as Ambika Pratap Rathore Chatterjee — Raghuvendra and Malvika's daughter; Mukta's half-sister; Sankrant's wife (2013–2015)
- Pawan Mahendru as Kasa Seth - Bundela family's servant (2009–2014)
- Sunil Sinha / Kiran Karmarkar as Tej Singh Bundela - Baldev's son; Umed's half-brother (2009–2013)
- Sharhaan Singh as Siddharth a.k.a Sid - Tapasya's ex-boyfriend (2009–2012)
- Rishina Kandhari as Malvika Pratap Rathore - Raghuvendra's first wife; Ambika's mother (2014–2015)
- Gaurav S Bajaj as Aman Verma - Meethi and Mukta's college friend (2012)
- Chaitanya Choudhury as Kanha Chatterjee/Singh Bundela - Ichcha and Veer's adoptive son; Yuvraj and Meethi's adoptive brother; Surbhi's husband (2012–2014)
- Pranitaa Pandit as Surbhi Chatterjee/Singh Bundela (née Yadav) - Kanha's wife; Agarth and Kadambari's daughter; Nirbhay's sister (2012–2013) (Dead)
- Arishfa Khan as Rani Chatterjee - Akash and Nandini's daughter; Meethi's stepdaughter; Tamanna's adoptive sister (2014–2015)
- An unknown child actress as Tamanna Chatterjee - Akash and Meethi's adoptive daughter; Rani's adoptive sister (2015)
- Rumi Khan as Nirbhay Yadav - Agarth and Kadambari's son; Surbhi's brother; Kajri's husband (2013)
- Arti Singh as Kajri Yadav - Nirbhay's wife (2013–2014)
- Girija Shankar as Agarth Yadav - Ekadashi, Gomati and Pavitra's brother; Kadambari's husband; Nirbhay and Surbhi's father (2013)
- Nilima Singh as Kadambari Yadav - Agarth's wife; Nirbhay and Surbhi's mother (2013)
- Neena Singh as Gomati Yadav - Agarth, Ekadashi and Pavitra's sister (2013–2015)
- Hetal Yadav as Pavitra Yadav - Agarth, Ekadashi and Gomati's sister (2013–2014)
- Sonica Handa as Amla Singh Bundela - Veer's fake wife (2012–2013)
- Rajesh Khera as Maharani (2014)
- Tiku Talsania as Colonel Swarnik Agnihotri (2014)
- Krip Suri as Asgar Rizvi - Ashfaque's brother (2014)
- Gaurav Vasudev as Babar (2014)
- Sahil Phull as Ashfaque Rizvi - A Pakistani guy who saves Meethi (2014)
- Anchal Sabharwal as Fida (2014)
- Shriya Jha as Nandini Sharma a.k.a Chameli - Akash's ex-girlfriend; Rani's mother (2014–2015)
- Madhura Naik as Nilofer Naaz (2014)
- Mansi Sharma as Saba Mehrami (2014)
- Samikssha Batnagar as Zubeida Ahmed (2014)
- Rakesh Pandey as Rizvi (2014)
- Charu Rohatgi as Mumtaz Begum (2014)
- Amrin Chakkiwala as Nusrat Rizvi (2014)
- Vineett Kumar / Rrajvir Singh as Khalid (2014)
- Unknown as Mushtaq Ansari Sahab (2014)
- Baby Farida as Anjum Jalalan - Damini's neighbor (2008–2014)
- Usha Bachani as Jailaxmi Khurana (2009)
- Aastha Chaudhary as Madhuran Sethi (2011)
- Sharad Kelkar as Satyaveer Singh - Veer's business rival (2011)
- An unknown actress as Kuki Arora (2009)
- Anjali Rana as Jyoti Bhatia (2008–2010)
- Shivshakti Sachdev as Lali Bhatia (2009)
- An unknown actor as Maharaj Karvansh - Thakur family's servant (2008–2009)
- Priya Marathe as Ruby Shekhawat - Rocky's girlfriend (2011–2012)
- Harsha Khandeparkar as Sanchi Singh - Satyaveer's sister (2011)
- Apurva as Kinjal (2010)
- Nikita Sharma as Masoom (2010)
- Arun Bali as Godman - Kanha's grandfather (2014)
- Vikas Sethi as Inspector Abeeran Mattoo (2010)
- Nikhil Arya as Inspector Suryakant Tarte (2011–2012)

== Production ==
=== Casting ===
The show initially starred Sparsh Khanchandani as young Ichcha with Ishita Panchal as young Tapasya in December 2008 to June 2009.

It later took a generation leap and from June 2009 to March 2012, it focused on the characters of Ichcha, Tapasya, Veer and Vansh played by Tina Datta, Rashami Desai, Nandish Sandhu and Rohit Khurana respectively. Sandhu quit the show as he doesn't want to be the part of 18 years leap and was replaced by Vikas Bhalla in 2012.

Another 18-year leap was introduced in March 2012 and then the story centered around the life of Meethi, Mukta, Yuvraj, Akash and Vishnu portrayed by Tina Datta, Sreejita De, Saurabh Raj Jain, Mrunal Jain and Ajay Chaudhary until its end in January 2015.

== Reception ==
Uttaran's premiere had a 3.25 target rating point (TRP) and it became one of the top-rated Hindi GEC, and the second most watched programs of Colors TV after Balika Vadhu at the time. It was one of the show that helped Colors TV to briefly gain first position in Hindi GEC, breaking the nine-year run of Star Plus. From 2008 until the first quarter of 2012, Uttaran maintained its top position mostly on the ratings charts.

== Adaptations ==
Language	Title	Original release	Networks	Last aired	Notes
Hindi	Uttaran उतरन	1 December 2008	Colors TV	16 January 2015	Original
Marathi	Asava Sundar Swapnancha Bangla असावा सुंदर स्वप्नांचा बंगला	7 January 2013	Colors Marathi	19 March 2016	Remake

== Awards ==
The series has won the following awards:

Year	Category	Recipient(s)
ITA Awards
2009	GR8! Ensemble Cast	Uttaran
2010	Best Actor in a Supporting Role	Ayub Khan
2010	Best Actress Popular	Rashami Desai
Indian Telly Awards
2010	Best Actor in a Supporting Role	Ayub Khan
2010	Best Actress in a Negative Role	Rashami Desai
2010	Best Daily Serial	Film Farm
2010	Best Actress in a Supporting Role Jury	Vaishali Thakkar
2013	Best Actor in a Negative Role Jury	Kiran Karmarkar
Apsara Awards
2010	Best Director	Nandita Mehra
2010	Best Actor in a Drama Series	Ayub Khan
2010	Best Actress in a Drama Series	Tina Datta
2011	Best Ensemble Cast	Uttaran
2011 (ColorsGolden Awards)	Popular Jodi	Tina Datta Nandish Sandhu
2012	Best Writer	Mitali Bhattacharya
Zee Gold Awards
2010	Best Debut Male	Nandish Sandhu
2010	Best Actor In Supporting Role (Popular)	Ayub Khan
2010	Best Actress In Negative Role (Popular)	Rashami Desai
2010	Best Story	Mitali Bhattacharya
2011	Best Actress (Critics)	Rashami Desai
2011	Best Actor In Supporting Role (Popular)	Ayub Khan
2013	Best Actor In Negative Role (Critics)	Kiran Karmarkar
2013	Gold Producer's Honour for Completing 1000 episodes	Film Farm
FICCI Frames Excellence Awards
2010	Best TV Series (Fiction)	Film Farm
2010	Best TV Actor (Male)	Ayub Khan
2011	Best TV Actor (Female)	Rashami Desai
