= Mrunal Jain =

Indian actor (born 1985)

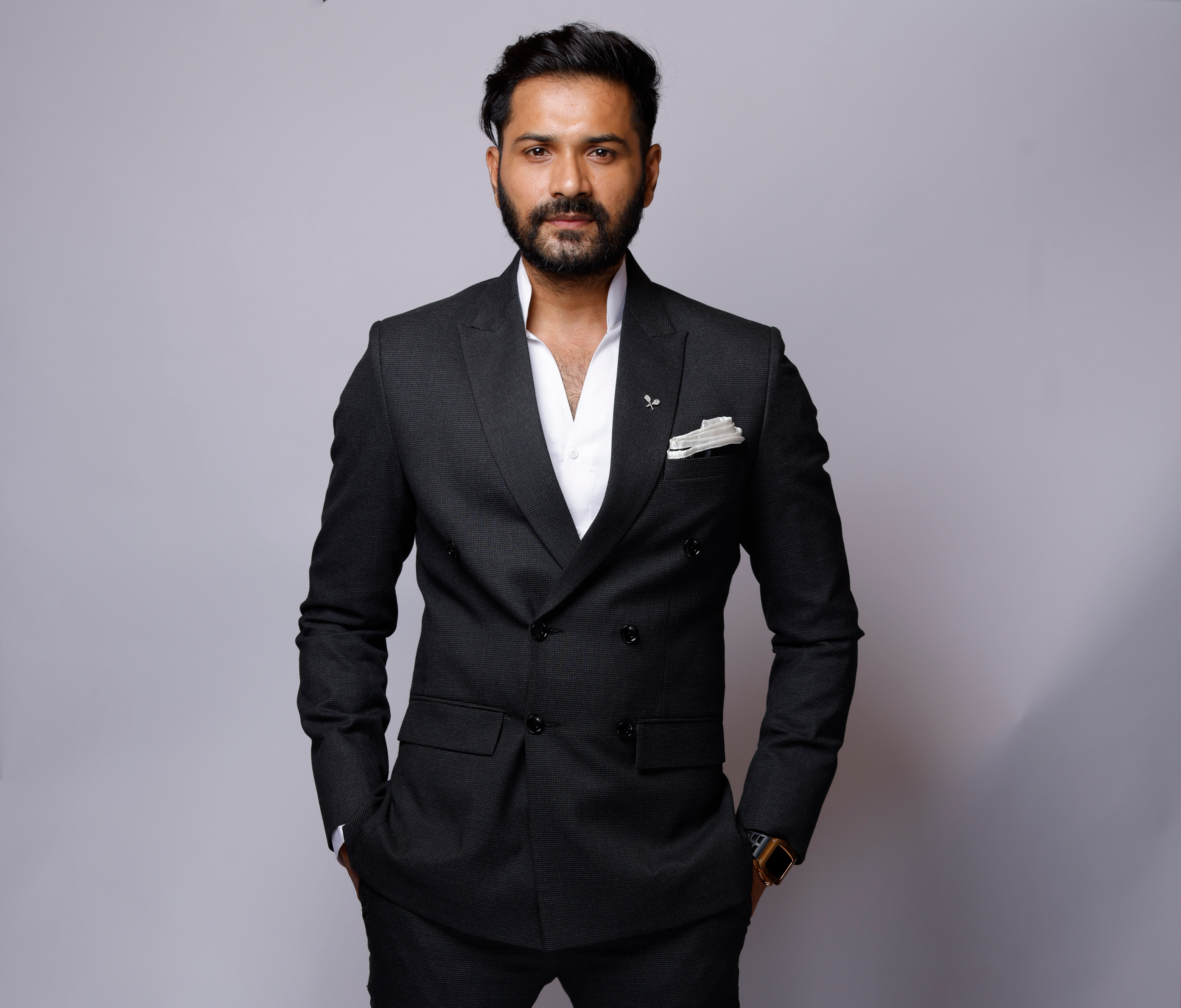
- Mrunal Jain at Tennis Premier League 2024
- Born: 9 January 1985 (age 40); Pindwara, Rajasthan, India
- Occupation(s): Co-founder Tennis Premier League & Former Actor
- Years active: 2008–present
- Spouse: Sweety Jain (m. 2013)

Mrunal Jain (born 9 January 1985) is a former Indian television and film actor and the co-founder of the Tennis Premier League (TPL), Asia's biggest tennis tournament,. He is best known for his role of Hiten, Sameer and Akash in the television series Bandini, Hitler Didi and Uttaran.

== Career ==
Mrunal Jain who was an actor in his earlier days quit acting to pursue his passion for business and organizational development. Over the past eight years, he has successfully built a thriving sports ecosystem through the Tennis Premier League, the TPL App, and his tennis academies.

He started his career with the role of Krishna in Kahaani Hamaaray Mahaabhaarat Ki. Later he appeared in Bandini as Hiten. He also acted in Hitler Didi as Sameer and Looteri Dulhan as Abhinav. He played the role of Akash Chatterjee in Uttaran opposite Tina Dutta. He was last seen playing the role of Raghav Patil in Bandhan as the lead opposite Chhavi Pandey.

== Personal life ==
Mrunal was born on 9 January 1985, in Ahmedabad and brought up in Mumbai. He is from a Jain family. He married Sweety Jain, whom he was introduced by a common friend of his and Sweety's family. The marriage took place on 13 July 2013 in Mumbai.

== From Acting to Entrepreneurship ==
Mrunal Jain's vision is to grow and create a complete ecosystem for tennis in India through TPL along with Kunal Thakkur (co-founder, TPL). Established in 2018, Tennis Premier League has witnessed immense success, evolving from a national League to an International league. TPL is supported by the All India Tennis Association (AITA), legendary tennis champion Leander Paes (18-time Grand Slam winner and 1996 Olympic medalist), and several prominent personalities.

In addition to the Tennis Premier League, Mrunal Jain, alongside Kunal Thakkur, has been actively involved in promoting Tennis at the grassroots level. They launched the TPL App, through which they have successfully conducted over 500 tournaments across India for various age categories, ranging from Under-8 to Open. Aiming to find the next Olympic tennis medalist for India, TPL also initiated the "Race to Gold" Scholarship Program.

== Filmography ==
=== Television ===
Year	Show	Role	Notes	Ref(s)
2008	Kahaani Hamaaray Mahaabhaarat Ki	Krishna		
2009–2011	Bandini	Hiten Dharamraj Mahiyavanshi	Lead	
2011	Looteri Dulhan	Abhinav	Lead	
2011–2012	Hitler Didi	Sameer Diwan		
2013–2015	Uttaran	Akash Chatterjee	Lead	
2014	Jhalak Dikhhla Jaa	Himself	Guest	
2014–2015	Box Cricket League	Himself	Contestant	
2015	Bandhan	Raghav Patil	Lead	
2016	Box Cricket League (Season 2)	Himself	Contestant	
2016–2017	Nagarjuna- Ek Yoddha	Shankachurna/Rajbir		
2017	Cinta di Pangkuan Himalaya	Arman		
2018	Laal Ishq Episode 5	Harsh/Sooraj	Episodic	
2018	Dil Hi Toh Hai	Arjun		
2022	Yeh Rishta Kya Kehlata Hai	Dr. Kunal Khera		
2024	Chaya Graha Rahu Ketu	Rahu		

=== Films ===
Year	Film	Role	Notes	Ref(s)
2013	Satya 2	Abhijeet	Hindi-Telugu bilingual film	
2020	Sab Kushal Mangal	Vishnu		
2021	Sooryavanshi	Raza Hafeez		
