= Rajesh Joshi (poet) =

Indian writer, poet and journalist (born 1946)

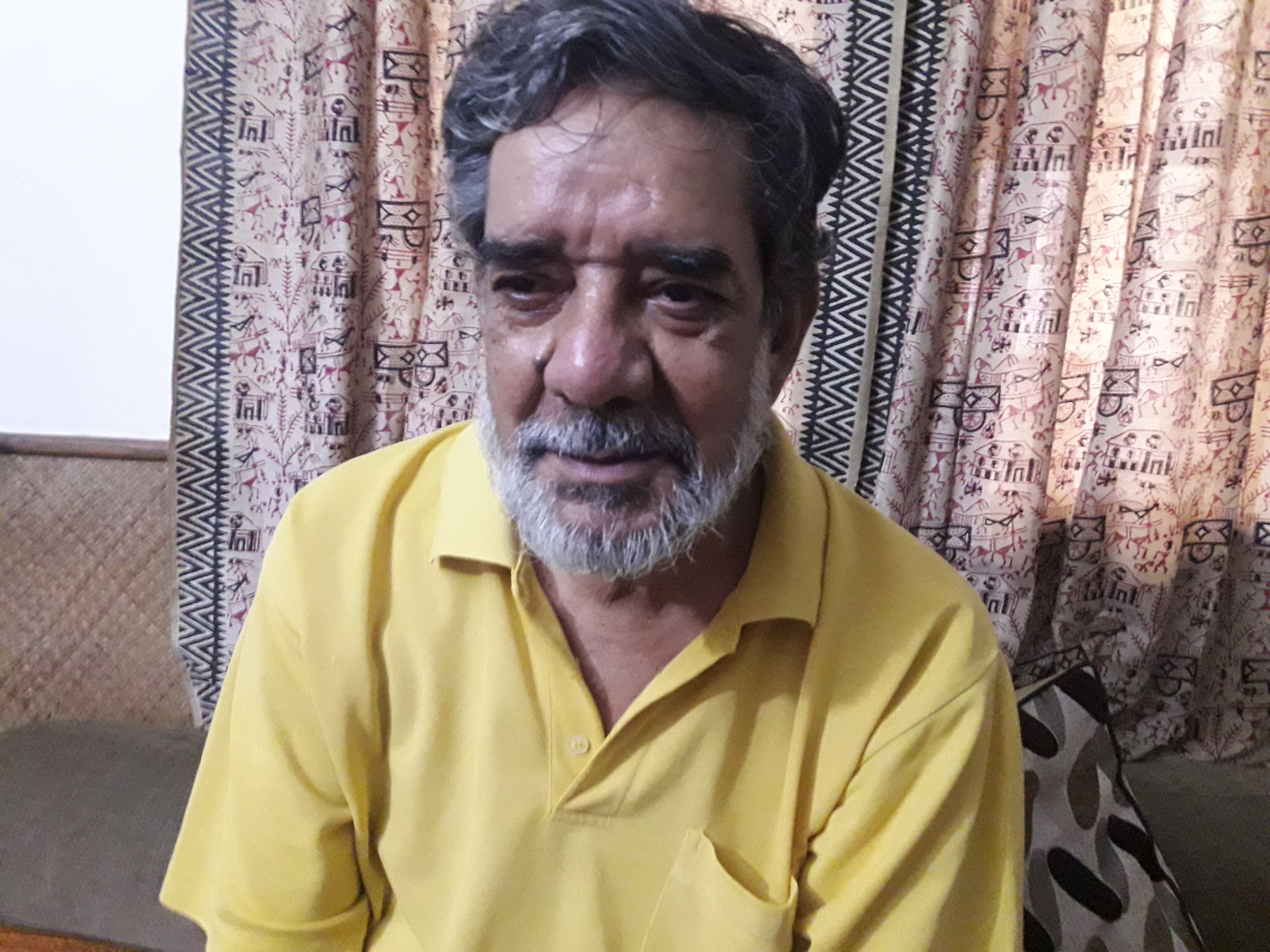
Rajesh Joshi at his home in Nirala Nagar, Bhopal, July 2017

Rajesh Joshi (born 18 July 1946) is a Hindi writer, poet, journalist and a playwright, who was the recipient of 2002 Sahitya Akademi Award in Hindi for his anthology of poems - 'Do Panktiyon Ke Beech' (Between Two Lines), given by Sahitya Akademi, India's National Academy of Letters. He presently resides in Bhopal and continues to work as a freelance writer. His poems have been translated into English, German, Russian, Urdu and into many other Indian languages. Recipient of Muktibodh Puraskar, Makhan Lal Chaturvedi Puraskar, Srikant Verma Smriti Samman, Shikhar Samman and others.

== Biography ==
Rajesh Joshi was born in 1946 in Narsinghgarh, Madhya Pradesh and graduated in 1966 with Biology, and thereafter took up a job as a school teacher in Ujjain and Indore, he also served as a bank clerk for a while, before leaving the profession in 1972, and starting his literary career as a freelance writer for journals like "Vatayan", "Lahar", "Pahal", "Dharamyug", "Saptahik Hindustan", "Sarika", etc. and later went on to edit magazines like "Naya Vikalp", "Naya Path" and "Vartman Sahitya". Over the years he has authored twelve books including four collections of poetry - "Ek Din Bolenge Ped", "Do Panktiyon Ke Beech" and others - with one long poem "Samargatha" and two short story collections "Samwar Aur Anya Kahaniyan" and "Kapil ka Ped", four plays and one collection of children's rhymes "Gend Nirali Mithoo Ki".

== Bibliography ==
- Nagarjuna Rachna Sanchayan (Hindi): An anthology of selected writings of Nagarjuna in Hindi, Compiled and edited by Rajesh Joshi, 2005, Sahitya Akademi, Delhi. ISBN 81-260-1907-7.
