= 2020 in Indian sport =

Overview of Indian sports events in 2020

The year 2020 in Indian sports describes the events that happened in the year 2020. Almost every sports event was affected due to the COVID-19 pandemic, and major events such as 2020 Tokyo Olympics and 2020 Tokyo Paralympics were postponed to next year.

== Multi-sport event ==
=== 2020 National Games of India ===
The 2020 edition of the National Games of India was to have been held between 20 October and 4 November 2020 in Goa. In May 2020, it was announced that games would be indefinitely postponed as a result of the global COVID-19 pandemic. They were ultimately cancelled with the next national games scheduled to be held between 27 September and 10 October 2022 in Gujarat. Goa subsequently hosted the 2023 edition.

== Badminton ==
=== 2020 Premier Badminton League ===
The 2020 edition of the Premier Badminton League, comprising seven teams, was held from 20 January to 9 February 2020 across three venues in India. Defending champions Bengaluru Raptors beat Northeastern Warriors with a score of 4–2 in the finals to retain their second consecutive title in PBL.

==== Final ====
9 February, 19:00 G. M. C. Balayogi Indoor Stadium, Hyderabad
#	Event	Team 1		Result			Team 2	
#	Event	Northeastern Warriors		2–4			Bengaluru Raptors	
1	MS		Lee Cheuk Yiu (Hong Kong)	0	15–14; 9–15; 3–15	1	(India) B. Sai Praneeth	
2	MD	TM	Bodin Isara (Thailand); Lee Yong-dae (South Korea)	2	15–11; 13–15; 15–14	0	(India) Arun George (Indonesia) Rian Agung Saputro	
3	WS		Michelle Li (Canada)	0	9–15; 12–15	1	(Chinese Taipei) Tai Tzu-ying	
4	XD		Krishna Prasad Garaga (India); Kim Ha-na (South Korea)	0	14–15; 15–14; 12–15	2	(Malaysia) Chan Peng Soon (South Korea) Eom Hye-won	TM
5	MS		Tanongsak Saensomboonsuk (Thailand)		–		(France) Brice Leverdez	

== Cricket ==
=== 2020 Indian Premier League ===
The 2020 edition of the Indian Premier League was originally scheduled to commence on 29 March 2020, but was suspended until 15 April due to the COVID-19 pandemic. Following the announcement of the lockdown extension, the BCCI suspended the tournament indefinitely. On 2 August 2020, it was announced that the tournament would be played between 19 September and 10 November 2020 in the United Arab Emirates. Defending champions Mumbai Indians successfully retained their title for the first time with a five-wicket win over Delhi Capitals in the final on 10 November 2020.

==== Final ====
10 November 2020
19:30 (D/N)
Scorecard

Delhi Capitals; 156/7 (20 overs)	v	Mumbai Indians; 157/5 (18.4 overs)
Shreyas Iyer 65* (50); Trent Boult 3/30 (4 overs)		Rohit Sharma 68 (51); Anrich Nortje 2/25 (2.4 overs)

Mumbai Indians won by 5 wickets
Dubai International Cricket Stadium, Dubai
Umpires: Chris Gaffaney (NZ) and Nitin Menon (Ind)
Player of the match: Trent Boult (Mumbai Indians)

- Delhi Capitals won the toss and elected to bat.
- This was the fifth IPL title for the Mumbai Indians and they became the second team to win consecutive IPL trophies after Chennai Super Kings in 2010 and 2011.

== Football ==
=== 2019–20 Indian Super League ===
The 2019-20 edition of the Indian Super League was held from 20 October 2019 to 14 March 2020. Hyderabad replaced the disbanded Pune City, whereas Delhi Dynamos moved to Bhubaneswar and rebranded as Odisha. ATK beat Chennaiyin 3–1 in the final, becoming the first club to win three ISL Cup titles. As the winners of the newly introduced ISL shield (given to table-toppers in group stage), Goa qualified for the group stage in the 2021 AFC Champions League.

==== Final ====
14 March 2020
19:30 IST

ATK	3–1	Chennaiyin
Hernández 10', 90+3'; Garcia 48'	Report	Valskis 69'

Fatorda Stadium, Margao
Attendance: 0
Referee: Kasimov Sherzod (Uzbekistan)
