= 2020 Premier Badminton League – League stage =

These are the results of the 2020 Premier Badminton League league stage.

== Results ==
=== Tie 1: Chennai Superstarz vs. Hyderabad Hunters ===
20, 19 January:00 Jawaharlal Nehru Indoor Stadium, Chennai
#	Event	Home		Result			Away	
#	Event	Chennai Superstarz		5–2			Hyderabad Hunters	
1	XD		Satwiksairaj Rankireddy (India); Jessica Pugh (England)	1	15–6; 13–15; 15–13	0	(Russia) Vladimir Ivanov (India) N. Sikki Reddy	
2	MS		Tommy Sugiarto (Indonesia)	1	15–11; 15–10	0	(India) Sourabh Verma	
3	MS	TM	Lakshya Sen (India)	2	15–6; 13–15; 15–14	0	(India) Priyanshu Rajawat	
4	WS		Gayathri Gopichand (India)	0	5–15; 5–15	2	(India) P. V. Sindhu	TM
5	MD		Satwiksairaj Rankireddy (India); B. Sumeeth Reddy (India)	1	15–14; 11–15; 15–8	0	(England) Ben Lane (England) Sean Vendy	

=== Tie 2: Northeastern Warriors vs. Bengaluru Raptors ===
21, 19 January:00 Jawaharlal Nehru Indoor Stadium, Chennai
#	Event	Home		Result			Away	
#	Event	Northeastern Warriors		4–3			Bengaluru Raptors	
1	XD		Lee Yong-dae (South Korea); Kim Ha-na (South Korea)	0	8–15; 11–15	1	(Malaysia) Chan Peng Soon (South Korea) Eom Hye-won	
2	MS		Lee Cheuk Yiu (Hong Kong)	1	15–14; 15–9	0	(India) B. Sai Praneeth	
3	WS		Ashmita Chaliha (India)	0	7–15; 5–15	2	(Chinese Taipei) Tai Tzu-ying	TM
4	MD	TM	Lee Yong-dae (South Korea); Bodin Isara (Thailand)	2	15–12; 15–6	0	(India) Arun George (Indonesia) Rian Agung Saputro	
5	MS		Tanongsak Saensomboonsuk (Thailand)	1	15–7; 15–8	0	(France) Brice Leverdez	

=== Tie 3: Chennai Superstarz vs. Mumbai Rockets ===
22, 19 January:00 Jawaharlal Nehru Indoor Stadium, Chennai
#	Event	Home		Result			Away	
#	Event	Chennai Superstarz		4–3			Mumbai Rockets	
1	XD		Dhruv Kapila (India); Jessica Pugh (England)	1	15–10; 15–14	0	(Indonesia) Pia Zebadiah (South Korea) Kim Gi-Jung	
2	MS		Lakshya Sen (India)	1	15–12; 15–10	0	(South Korea) Lee Dong-Keun	
3	MS	TM	Tommy Sugiarto (Indonesia)	2	14–15; 15–10; 15–7	0	(India) Parupalli Kashyap	
4	MD		Dhruv Kapila (India); B. Sumeeth Reddy (India)	0	9–15; 12–15	2	(South Korea) Kim Gi-Jung (South Korea) Kim Sa-Rang	TM
5	WS		Gayatri Gopichand (India)	0	15–14; 5–15; 13–15	1	(India) Shreyanshi Pardeshi	

=== Tie 4: Northeastern Warriors vs. Awadhe Warriors ===
23, 19 January:00 Jawaharlal Nehru Indoor Stadium, Chennai
#	Event	Home		Result			Away	
#	Event	Northeastern Warriors		3–4			Awadhe Warriors	
1	XD		Bodin Isara (Thailand); Kim Ha-na (South Korea)	0	15–8; 11–15; 14–15	1	(South Korea) Ko Sung-hyun (Denmark) Christinna Pedersen	
2	MS	TM	Lee Cheuk Yiu (Hong Kong)	2	13–15; 15–10; 15–11	0	(Hong Kong) Wong Wing Ki Vincent	
3	WS		Michelle Li (Canada)	1	15–13; 15–14	0	(United States) Beiwen Zhang	
4	MD		Krishna Prasad Garaga (India); Lee Yong-dae (South Korea)	0	15–8; 14–15; 12–15	2	(South Korea) Ko Sung-hyun (South Korea) Shin Baek-cheol	TM
5	MS		Tanongsak Saensomboonsuk (Thailand)	0	9–15; 13–15	1	(India) Subhankar Dey	

=== Tie 5: Chennai Superstarz vs. Bengaluru Raptors ===
24, 19 January:00 Jawaharlal Nehru Indoor Stadium, Chennai
#	Event	Home		Result			Away	
#	Event	Chennai Superstarz		4–3			Bengaluru Raptors	
1	XD		Dhruv Kapila (India); Jessica Pugh (England)	0	7–15; 8–15	2	(Malaysia) Chan Peng Soon (South Korea) Eom Hye-won	TM
2	MS		Tommy Sugiarto (Indonesia)	1	15–13; 10–15; 15–11	0	(India) B. Sai Praneeth	
3	MS	TM	Lakshya Sen (India)	2	15–5; 15–4	0	(France) Brice Leverdez	
4	WS		Gayatri Gopichand (India)	0	15–13; 6–15; 6–15	1	(Chinese Taipei) Tai Tzu-ying	
5	MD		Satwiksairaj Rankireddy (India); Dhruv Kapila (India)	1	13–15; 15–9; 15–9	0	(Malaysia) Chan Peng Soon (Indonesia) Rian Agung Saputro	

=== Tie 6: Pune 7 Aces vs. Mumbai Rockets ===
25, 19 January:00 Babu Banarasi Das Indoor Stadium, Lucknow
#	Event	Home		Result			Away	
#	Event	Pune 7 Aces		5–2			Mumbai Rockets	
1	MD		Chirag Shetty (India); Hendra Setiawan (Indonesia)	1	14–15; 15–5; 15–6	0	(South Korea) Kim Gi-Jung (South Korea) Kim Sa-Rang	
2	WS	TM	Rituparna Das (India)	2	11–15; 15–9; 15–9	0	(India) Shreyanshi Pardeshi	
3	MS		Loh Kean Yew (Singapore)	1	15–7; 15–14	0	(India) Parupalli Kashyap	
4	MS		Kazumasa Sakai (Japan)	0	7–15; 13–15	2	(South Korea) Lee Dong-Keun	TM
5	XD		Chris Adcock (England); Gabby Adcock (England)	1	15–12; 10–15; 15–6	0	(Indonesia) Pia Zebadiah (South Korea) Kim Gi-Jung	

=== Tie 7: Awadhe Warriors vs. Hyderabad Hunters ===
26, 19 January:00 Babu Banarasi Das Indoor Stadium, Lucknow
#	Event	Home		Result			Away	
#	Event	Awadhe Warriors		1–2			Hyderabad Hunters	
1	MS		Subhankar Dey (India)	0	15–14; 12–15; 10–15	1	(India) Sourabh Verma	
2	XD	TM	Shin Baek-cheol (South Korea); Christinna Pedersen (Denmark)	-1	12–15; 14–15	1	(Russia) Vladimir Ivanov (India) N. Sikki Reddy	
3	WS		Tanvi Lad (India)	0	8–15; 8–15	1	(India) P. V. Sindhu	
4	MS		Wong Wing Ki Vincent (Hong Kong)	1	15–14; 15–9	-1	(Malaysia) Liew Daren	TM
5	MD		Ko Sung-hyun (South Korea); Shin Baek-cheol (South Korea)	1	15–12; 15–8	0	(Russia) Vladimir Ivanov (England) Ben Lane	

=== Tie 8: Pune 7 Aces vs. Bengaluru Raptors ===
27, 19 January:00 Babu Banarasi Das Indoor Stadium, Lucknow
#	Event	Home		Result			Away	
#	Event	Pune 7 Aces		4–3			Bengaluru Raptors	
1	MS		Kazumasa Sakai (Japan)	1	15–14; 15–9	0	(India) Ansal Yadav	
2	MS		Loh Kean Yew (Singapore)	0	15–10; 7–15; 8–15	1	(India) B. Sai Praneeth	
3	WS		Rituparna Das (India)	0	3–15; 9–15	2	(Chinese Taipei) Tai Tzu-ying	TM
4	MD	TM	Chirag Shetty (India); Hendra Setiawan (Indonesia)	2	15–14; 15–3	0	(India) Arun George (Indonesia) Rian Agung Saputro	
5	XD		Chris Adcock (England); Gabby Adcock (England)	1	10–15; 15–11; 15–12	0	(Malaysia) Chan Peng Soon (South Korea) Eom Hye-won	

=== Tie 9: Awadhe Warriors vs. Mumbai Rockets ===
28, 19 January:00 Babu Banarasi Das Indoor Stadium, Lucknow
#	Event	Home		Result			Away	
#	Event	Awadhe Warriors		5–0			Mumbai Rockets	
1	XD		Shin Baek-cheol (South Korea); Christinna Pedersen (Denmark)	0	9–15; 14–15	1	(Indonesia) Pia Zebadiah (South Korea) Kim Sa-Rang	
2	WS	TM	Beiwen Zhang (United States)	2	15–3; 15–4	0	(India) Kuhoo Garg	
3	MS		Wong Wing Ki Vincent (Hong Kong)	1	15–8; 15–10	-1	(India) Parupalli Kashyap	TM
4	MS		Ajay Jayaram (India)	1	12–15; 15–6; 15–7	0	(South Korea) Lee Dong-Keun	
5	MD		Ko Sung-hyun (South Korea); Shin Baek-cheol (South Korea)	1	14–15; 15–10; 15–14	0	(South Korea) Kim Gi-Jung (South Korea) Kim Sa-Rang	

=== Tie 10: Hyderabad Hunters vs. Northeastern Warriors ===
29, 19 January:00 G. M. C. Balayogi SATS Indoor Stadium, Hyderabad
#	Event	Home		Result			Away	
#	Event	Hyderabad Hunters		2–1			Northeastern Warriors	
1	XD		Vladimir Ivanov (Russia); N. Sikki Reddy (India)	1	15–12; 8–15; 15–12	0	(India) Krishna Prasad Garaga (South Korea) Kim Ha-na	
2	MS	TM	Sourabh Verma (India)	-1	14–15; 14–15	1	(Thailand) Tanongsak Saensomboonsuk	
3	WS		P. V. Sindhu (India)	0	8–15; 9–15	1	(Canada) Michelle Li	
4	MD		Ben Lane (England); Vladimir Ivanov (Russia)	1	15–7; 15–10	-1	(Thailand) Bodin Isara (South Korea) Lee Yong-dae	TM
5	MS		Liew Daren (Malaysia)	1	15–9; 15–10	0	(Hong Kong) Lee Cheuk Yiu	

=== Tie 11: Pune 7 Aces vs. Chennai Superstarz ===
10, 15 January:30 G. M. C. Balayogi SATS Indoor Stadium, Hyderabad
#	Event	Home		Result			Away	
#	Event	Pune 7 Aces		5–2			Chennai Superstarz	
1	XD		Chris Adcock (England); Gabby Adcock (England)	1	15–10; 15–12	0	(India) Satwiksairaj Rankireddy (England) Jessica Pugh	
2	WS		Rituparna Das (India)	0	12–15; 6–15	2	(Scotland) Kirsty Gilmour	TM
3	MS		Loh Kean Yew (Singapore)	1	15–13; 10–15; 15–8	0	(India) Lakshya Sen	
4	MD	TM	Chirag Shetty (India); Hendra Setiawan (Indonesia)	2	15–12; 15–14	0	(India) Satwiksairaj Rankireddy (India) B. Sumeeth Reddy	
5	MS		Kazumasa Sakai (Japan)	1	15–10; 15–12	0	(India) Sathish Kumar Karunakaran	

=== Tie 12: Mumbai Rockets vs. Northeastern Warriors ===
30, 19 January:00 G. M. C. Balayogi SATS Indoor Stadium, Hyderabad
#	Event	Home		Result			Away	
#	Event	Mumbai Rockets		2–5			Northeastern Warriors	
1	XD		Pia Zebadiah (Indonesia); Kim Gi-Jung (South Korea)	0	7–15; 15–5; 10–15	1	(South Korea) Lee Yong-dae (South Korea) Kim Ha-na	
2	WS		Shreyanshi Pardeshi (India)	0	9–15; 11–15	2	(Canada) Michelle Li	TM
3	MS		Parupalli Kashyap (India)	0	12–15; 11–15	1	(Hong Kong) Lee Cheuk Yiu	
4	MD	TM	Kim Gi-Jung (South Korea); Kim Sa-Rang (South Korea)	2	15–9; 15–8	0	(India) Krishna Prasad Garaga (South Korea) Lee Yong-dae	
5	MS		Lee Dong-Keun (South Korea)	0	10–15; 7–15	1	(Thailand) Tanongsak Saensomboonsuk	

=== Tie 13: Hyderabad Hunters vs. Bengaluru Raptors ===
31, 19 January:00 G. M. C. Balayogi SATS Indoor Stadium, Hyderabad
#	Event	Home		Result			Away	
#	Event	Hyderabad Hunters		0–3			Bengaluru Raptors	
1	MD		Ben Lane (England); Vladimir Ivanov (Russia)	0	13–15; 15–9; 12–15	1	(Malaysia) Chan Peng Soon (Indonesia) Rian Agung Saputro	
2	MS	TM	Sourabh Verma (India)	-1	12–15; 15–10; 6–15	1	(France) Brice Leverdez	
3	WS		P. V. Sindhu (India)	0	15–11; 13–15; 15–9	1	(Chinese Taipei) Tai Tzu-ying	
4	XD		Vladimir Ivanov (Russia); N. Sikki Reddy (India)	1	15–13; 15–11	-1	(Malaysia) Chan Peng Soon (South Korea) Eom Hye-won	TM
5	MS		Liew Daren (Malaysia)	0	11–15; 6–15	1	(India) B. Sai Praneeth	

=== Tie 14: Pune 7 Aces vs. Northeastern Warriors ===
1, 15 February:30 G. M. C. Balayogi SATS Indoor Stadium, Hyderabad
#	Event	Home		Result			Away	
#	Event	Pune 7 Aces		0–5			Northeastern Warriors	
1	MS		Kazumasa Sakai (Japan)	0	13–15; 14–15	1	(Thailand) Tanongsak Saensomboonsuk	
2	XD	TM	Chris Adcock (England); Gabby Adcock (England)	-1	6–15; 8–15	1	(South Korea) Lee Yong-dae (South Korea) Kim Ha-na	
3	MS		Loh Kean Yew (Singapore)	0	12–15; 8–15	1	(Hong Kong) Lee Cheuk Yiu	
4	WS		Rituparna Das (India)	0	8–15; 15–13; 13–15	2	(Canada) Michelle Li	TM
5	MD		Chirag Shetty (India); Hendra Setiawan (Indonesia)	1	15–12; 15–8	0	(India) Krishna Prasad Garaga (Thailand) Bodin Isara	

=== Tie 15: Awadhe Warriors vs. Chennai Superstarz ===
1, 19 February:00 G. M. C. Balayogi SATS Indoor Stadium, Hyderabad
#	Event	Home		Result			Away	
#	Event	Awadhe Warriors		3–4			Chennai Superstarz	
1	MS		Subhankar Dey (India)	0	7–15; 8–15	1	(India) Lakshya Sen	
2	MD	TM	Ko Sung-hyun (South Korea); Ivan Sozonov (Russia)	2	12–15; 15–11; 15–10	0	(India) Satwiksairaj Rankireddy (India) Dhruv Kapila	
3	MS		Wong Wing Ki Vincent (Hong Kong)	0	10–15; 8–15	2	(Indonesia) Tommy Sugiarto	TM
4	WS		Beiwen Zhang (United States)	1	15–10; 15–5	0	(India) Gayatri Gopichand	
5	XD		Shin Baek-cheol (South Korea); Christinna Pedersen (Denmark)	0	11–15; 15–13; 14–15	1	(India) Satwiksairaj Rankireddy (England) Jessica Pugh	

=== Tie 16: Hyderabad Hunters vs. Mumbai Rockets ===
2, 19 February:00 G. M. C. Balayogi SATS Indoor Stadium, Hyderabad
#	Event	Home		Result			Away	
#	Event	Hyderabad Hunters		4–3			Mumbai Rockets	
1	MD		Ben Lane (England); Vladimir Ivanov (Russia)	0	10–15; 8–15	1	(South Korea) Kim Gi-jung (South Korea) Kim Sa-rang	
2	MS		Liew Daren (Malaysia)	0	8–15; 13–15	2	(India) Parupalli Kashyap	TM
3	WS	TM	P. V. Sindhu (India)	2	15–5; 15–10	0	(India) Shreyanshi Pardeshi	
4	MS		Priyanshu Rajawat (India)	1	15–13; 15–9	0	(South Korea) Lee Dong-Keun	
5	XD		Vladimir Ivanov (Russia); N. Sikki Reddy (India)	1	15–8; 15–8	0	(Indonesia) Pia Zebadiah Bernadeth (South Korea) Kim Sa-Rang	

=== Tie 17: Awadhe Warriors vs. Pune 7 Aces ===
3, 19 February:00 G. M. C. Balayogi SATS Indoor Stadium, Hyderabad
#	Event	Home		Result			Away	
#	Event	Awadhe Warriors		1–4			Pune 7 Aces	
1	MD		Ko Sung-hyun (South Korea); Shin Baek-cheol (South Korea)	1	6–15; 15–9; 15–12	0	(India) Chirag Shetty (Indonesia) Hendra Setiawan	
2	WS	TM	Beiwen Zhang (United States)	-1	13–15; 12–15	1	(India) Rituparna Das	
3	XD		Ivan Sozonov (Russia); Christinna Pedersen (Denmark)	0	6–15; 9–15	1	(England) Chris Adcock (England) Gabby Adcock	
4	MS		Subhankar Dey (India)	0	12–15; 14–15	2	(Singapore) Loh Kean Yew	TM
5	MS		Ajay Jayaram (India)	1	6–15; 15–10; 15–13	0	(Japan) Kazumasa Sakai	

=== Tie 18: Northeastern Warriors vs. Chennai Superstarz ===
4, 15 February:30 G. M. C. Balayogi SATS Indoor Stadium, Hyderabad
#	Event	Home		Result			Away	
#	Event	Northeastern Warriors		4–3			Chennai Superstarz	
1	MS		Kaushal Dharmamer (India)	1	15–3; 15–11	0	(India) Sathish Kumar Karunakaran	
2	MD		Krishna Prasad Garaga (India); Bodin Isara (Thailand)	0	13–15; 14–15	1	(India) Dhruv Kapila (India) B. Sumeeth Reddy	
3	WS		Ashmita Chaliha (India)	0	12–15; 11–15	2	(Scotland) Kirsty Gilmour	TM
4	MS	TM	Lee Cheuk Yiu (Hong Kong)	2	15–8; 15–11	0	(India) Sankar Muthusamy Subramanian	
5	XD		Lee Yong-dae (South Korea); Kim Ha-na (South Korea)	1	15–11; 15–9	0	(India) Dhruv Kapila (India) Sanjana Santosh	

=== Tie 19: Bengaluru Raptors vs. Mumbai Rockets ===
4, 19 February:00 G. M. C. Balayogi SATS Indoor Stadium, Hyderabad
#	Event	Home		Result			Away	
#	Event	Bengaluru Raptors		5–0			Mumbai Rockets	
1	MD		Arun George (India); Rian Agung Saputro (Indonesia)	0	15–13; 8–15; 10–15	1	(South Korea) Kim Gi-jung (South Korea) Kim Sa-rang	
2	WS		Tai Tzu-ying (Chinese Taipei)	1	15–8; 15–12	0	(India) Shreyanshi Pardeshi	
3	MS	TM	B. Sai Praneeth (India)	2	15–14; 14–15; 15–14	0	(India) Parupalli Kashyap	
4	MS		Brice Leverdez (France)	1	15–12; 10–15; 15–10	-1	(India) Shreyansh Jaiswal	TM
5	XD		(Malaysia) Chan Peng Soon (South Korea) Eom Hye-won	1	15–8; 15–12	0	(Indonesia) Pia Zebadiah Bernadeth (South Korea) Kim Sa-Rang	

=== Tie 20: Hyderabad Hunters vs. Pune 7 Aces ===
5, 19 February:00 G. M. C. Balayogi SATS Indoor Stadium, Hyderabad
#	Event	Home		Result			Away	
#	Event	Hyderabad Hunters		1–2			Pune 7 Aces	
1	MD		Ben Lane (England); Sean Vendy (England)	0	12–15; 9–15	1	(India) Chirag Shetty (Indonesia) Hendra Setiawan	
2	MS	TM	Priyanshu Rajawat (India)	-1	11–15; 15–11; 13–15	1	(India) Mithun Manjunath	
3	WS		P. V. Sindhu (India)	1	15–7; 15–8	0	(India) Rituparna Das	
4	XD		Vladimir Ivanov (Russia); N. Sikki Reddy (India)	1	15–9; 11–15; 15–8	-1	(England) Chris Adcock (England) Gabby Adcock	TM
5	MS		Sourabh Verma (India)	0	14–15; 10–15	1	(Singapore) Loh Kean Yew	

=== Tie 21: Bengaluru Raptors vs. Awadhe Warriors ===
6, 19 February:00 G. M. C. Balayogi SATS Indoor Stadium, Hyderabad
#	Event	Home		Result			Away	
#	Event	Bengaluru Raptors		5–0			Awadhe Warriors	
1	MD		Arun George (India); Rian Agung Saputro (Indonesia)	0	15–14; 7–15; 11–15	1	(South Korea) Ko Sung-hyun (South Korea) Shin Baek-cheol	
2	MS		Brice Leverdez (France)	1	15–9; 15–9	-1	(India) Ajay Jayaram	TM
3	WS		Tai Tzu-ying (Chinese Taipei)	1	15–12; 15–12	0	(United States) Beiwen Zhang	
4	MS	TM	B. Sai Praneeth (India)	2	15–11; 15–13	0	(Hong Kong) Wong Wing Ki Vincent	
5	XD		(Malaysia) Chan Peng Soon (South Korea) Eom Hye-won	1	7–15; 15–12; 15–11	0	(South Korea) Ko Sung-hyun (Denmark) Christinna Pedersen	
