= 2020 in badminton =

== Summer Olympics ==
- ~~July 25 – August 3~~ Postponed: Badminton at the 2020 Summer Olympics in (Japan) Tokyo
  - Men's singles:
    - (gold) (Denmark) Viktor Axelsen
    - (silver) (China) Chen Long
    - (bronze) (Indonesia) Anthony Sinisuka Ginting
  - Women's singles:
    - (gold) (China) Chen Yufei
    - (silver) (Chinese Taipei) Tai Tzu-ying
    - (bronze) (India) P.V.Sindhu
  - Men's doubles:
    - (gold) (Chinese Taipei) (Lee Yang & Wang Chi-lin)
    - (silver) (China) (Li Junhui & Liu Yuchen)
    - (bronze) (Malaysia) (Aaron Chia & Soh Wooi Yik)
  - Women's doubles:
    - (gold) (Indonesia) (Greysia Polii & Apriyani Rahayu)
    - (silver) (China) (Chen Qingchen & Jia Yifan)
    - (bronze) (South Korea) (Kim So-yeong & Kong Hee-yong)
  - Mixed doubles:
    - (gold) (China) (Wang Yilyu & Huang Dongping)
    - (silver) (China) (Zheng Siwei & Huang Yaqiong)
    - (bronze) (Japan) (Yuta Watanabe & Arisa Higashino)

== Summer Paralympics ==
- ~~September 2 – 6~~ Postponed: Badminton at the 2020 Summer Paralympics (debut event) in (Japan) Tokyo
  - Men's singles:
  - Women's singles:
  - Men's doubles:
  - Women's doubles:
  - Mixed doubles:

== International badminton events (Grade 1) ==
- August 15 – 23: 2020 Thomas & Uber Cup in (Denmark) Aarhus
  - Thomas Cup winners: Indonesia
  - Uber Cup winners: China
- September 28 – October 11: 2020 BWF World Junior Championships in (New Zealand) Auckland
  - Singles: (m) / (f)
  - Doubles: ( & ) (m) / ( & ) (f)
  - Mixed: ( & )
  - Team:

== Continental badminton events ==
- February 10 – 15: 2020 Oceania Badminton Championships (Senior & Teams) in Australia Ballarat
  - Singles: (New Zealand) Abhinav Manota (m) / (Australia) Chen Hsuan-yu (f)
  - Doubles: New Zealand (Oliver Leydon-Davis & Abhinav Manota) (m) / Australia (Setyana Mapasa & Gronya Somerville) (f)
  - Mixed: Australia (Simon Leung & Gronya Somerville)
  - Men's team: Australia (Anthony Joe, Jacob Schueler, Keith Mark Edison, Lin Ying Xiang, Matthew Chau, Mitchell Wheller, Sawan Serasinghe, Simon Leung)
  - Women's team: Australia (Angela Yu, Chen Hsuan-yu, Gronya Somerville, Kaitlyn Ea, Louisa Ma, Setyana Mapasa, Sylvina Kurniawan, Tiffany Ho)
- February 10 – 13: 2020 All Africa Men's and Women's Team Badminton Championships in Cairo
  - Men's team: Algeria (Adel Hamek, Koceila Mammeri, Mohamed Abderrahime Belarbi, Youcef Sabri Medel)
  - Women's team: Egypt (Doha Hany, Hadia Hosny, Hana Tarek Mohamed, Jana Ashraf, Nour Ahmed Youssri, Rahma Mohamed Saad Eladawy)
- February 10 – 13: 2020 African Badminton Championships in Cairo
  - Singles: (Mauritius) Georges Paul (m) / (Mauritius) Kate Foo Kune (f)
  - Doubles: Algeria (Koceila Mammeri & Youcef Sabri Medel) (m) / Egypt (Doha Hany & Hadia Hosny) (f)
  - Mixed: Egypt (Adham Hatem Elgamal & Doha Hany)
- February 11 – 16: 2020 European Men's and Women's Team Badminton Championships in (France) Liévin
  - Men's team: Denmark (Anders Antonsen, Anders Skaarup Rasmussen, Carsten Mogensen, Frederik Søgaard, Hans-Kristian Vittinghus, Jan Ø. Jørgensen, Kim Astrup, Mads Conrad-Petersen, Mathias Boe, Viktor Axelsen)
  - Women's team: Denmark (Alexandra Bøje, Amalie Magelund, Freja Ravn, Julie Dawall Jakobsen, Line Christophersen, Line Kjærsfeldt, Maiken Fruergaard, Mette Poulsen, Mia Blichfeldt, Sara Thygesen)
- February 11 – 16: 2020 Badminton Asia Team Championships in Philippines Manila
  - Men's team: Indonesia (Anthony Sinisuka Ginting, Fajar Alfian, Firman Abdul Kholik, Hendra Setiawan, Jonatan Christie, Kevin Sanjaya Sukamuljo, Marcus Fernaldi Gideon, Mohammad Ahsan, Muhammad Rian Ardianto, Shesar Hiren Rhustavito)
  - Women's team: Japan (Akane Yamaguchi, Aya Ohori, Chiharu Shida, Mayu Matsumoto, Nami Matsuyama, Riko Gunji, Sayaka Hirota, Sayaka Takahashi, Wakana Nagahara, Yuki Fukushima)
- February 13 – 16: 2020 Pan Am Badminton Team Championships in (Brazil) Salvador
  - Men's team: Canada (Antonio Li, Brian Yang, Jason Ho-shue, Joshua Hurlburt-Yu, Maxime Tétreault, Nyl Yakura, Phillipe Charron)
  - Women's team: Canada (Brittney Tam, Catherine Choi, Jacqueline Cheung, Kyleigh O'Donoghue, Kristen Tsai, Michelle Li, Rachel Honderich, Zhang Wen Yu)
- April 21 – 26: 2020 European Badminton Championships in Ukraine Kyiv
  - Singles: (m) / (f)
  - Doubles: ( & ) (m) / ( & ) (f)
  - Mixed: ( & )
- April 21 – 26: 2020 Badminton Asia Championships in (Philippines) Manila
  - Singles: (m) / (f)
  - Doubles: ( & ) (m) / ( & ) (f)
  - Mixed: ( & )
- April 23 – 26: 2020 Pan Am Badminton Championships in Guatemala City
  - Singles: (m) / (f)
  - Doubles: ( & ) (m) / ( & ) (f)
  - Mixed: ( & )
- July 11 – 19: 2020 Badminton Asia Junior Championships in (China) Suzhou
  - Singles: (m) / (f)
  - Doubles: ( & ) (m) / ( & ) (f)
  - Mixed: ( & )
  - Team:
- July 9 – 17: 2020 Pan Am Badminton Junior Championships in (Mexico) Acapulco
  - Singles: (m) / (f)
  - Doubles: ( & ) (m) / ( & ) (f)
  - Mixed: ( & )
  - Team:
- September 25 – 27: 2020 All Africa Badminton Junior Championships in (Benin) Cotonou
  - Singles: (m) / (f)
  - Doubles: ( & ) (m) / ( & ) (f)
  - Mixed: ( & )
- October 30 – November 8: 2020 European Badminton Junior Championships in (Poland) Gliwice
  - Singles: (m) / (f)
  - Doubles: ( & ) (m) / ( & ) (f)
  - Mixed: ( & )
  - Team:
- August 3 – 7: 2020 Badminton Asia Senior Championships in (Sri Lanka) Colombo
  - Men's singles:
    - 35+:
    - 40+:
    - 45+:
    - 50+:
    - 55+:
    - 60+:
    - 65+:
    - 70+:
    - 75+:
  - Women's singles:
    - 35+:
    - 40+:
    - 45+:
    - 50+:
    - 55+:
    - 60+:
    - 65+:
    - 70+:
    - 75+:
  - Men's doubles:
    - 35+: ( & )
    - 40+: ( & )
    - 45+: ( & )
    - 50+: ( & )
    - 55+: ( & )
    - 60+: ( & )
    - 65+: ( & )
    - 70+: ( & )
    - 75+: ( & )
  - Women's doubles:
    - 35+: ( & )
    - 40+: ( & )
    - 45+: ( & )
    - 50+: ( & )
    - 55+: ( & )
    - 60+: ( & )
    - 65+: ( & )
    - 70+: ( & )
    - 75+: ( & )
  - Mixed doubles:
    - 35+: ( & )
    - 40+: ( & )
    - 45+: ( & )
    - 50+: ( & )
    - 55+: ( & )
    - 60+: ( & )
    - 65+: ( & )
    - 70+: ( & )
    - 75+: ( & )

== 2020 BWF season (Grade 2) ==
- January 7 – December 13: 2020 BWF World Tour

=== Level 1 (World Tour Finals) ===
- December 9 – 13: 2020 BWF World Tour Finals in (China) Guangzhou
  - Singles: (m) / (f)
  - Doubles: ( & ) (m) / ( & ) (f)
  - Mixed: ( & )

=== Level 2 (Super 1000) ===
- March 11 – 15: 2020 All England Open in Birmingham
  - Singles: (Denmark) Viktor Axelsen (m) / (Chinese Taipei) Tai Tzu-ying (f)
  - Doubles: Japan (Hiroyuki Endo & Yuta Watanabe) (m) / Japan (Yuki Fukushima & Sayaka Hirota) (f)
  - Mixed: Indonesia (Praveen Jordan & Melati Daeva Oktavianti)
- June 16 – 21: 2020 Indonesia Open in Jakarta
  - Singles: (m) / (f)
  - Doubles: ( & ) (m) / ( & ) (f)
  - Mixed: ( & )
- September 15 – 20: 2020 China Open in Changzhou
  - Singles: (m) / (f)
  - Doubles: ( & ) (m) / ( & ) (f)
  - Mixed: ( & )

=== Level 3 (Super 750) ===
- ~~March 31 – April 5~~ Postponed: 2020 Malaysia Open in Kuala Lumpur
  - Singles: (m) / (f)
  - Doubles: ( & ) (m) / ( & ) (f)
  - Mixed: ( & )
- September 22 – 27: 2020 Japan Open in Tokyo
  - Singles: (m) / (f)
  - Doubles: ( & ) (m) / ( & ) (f)
  - Mixed: ( & )
- October 13 – 18: 2020 Denmark Open in Odense
  - Singles: (Denmark) Anders Antonsen (m) / (Japan) Nozomi Okuhara (f)
  - Doubles: (England) (Marcus Ellis & Chris Langridge) (m) / (Japan) (Yuki Fukushima & Sayaka Hirota) (f)
  - Mixed: (Germany) (Mark Lamsfuß & Isabel Herttrich)
- October 20 – 25: 2020 French Open in (France) Paris
  - Singles: (m) / (f)
  - Doubles: ( & ) (m) / ( & ) (f)
  - Mixed: ( & )
- November 3 – 8: 2020 Fuzhou China Open in Fuzhou
  - Singles: (m) / (f)
  - Doubles: ( & ) (m) / ( & ) (f)
  - Mixed: ( & )

=== Level 4 (Super 500) ===
- January 7 – 12: 2020 Malaysia Masters in Kuala Lumpur
  - Singles: (Japan) Kento Momota (m) / (China) Chen Yufei (f)
  - Doubles: South Korea (Kim Gi-jung & Lee Yong-dae) (m) / China (Li Wenmei & Zheng Yu) (f)
  - Mixed: China (Zheng Siwei & Huang Yaqiong)
- January 14 – 21: 2020 Indonesia Masters in Jakarta
  - Singles: (Indonesia) Anthony Sinisuka Ginting (m) / (Thailand) Ratchanok Intanon (f)
  - Doubles: Indonesia (Marcus Fernaldi Gideon & Kevin Sanjaya Sukamuljo) (m) / Indonesia (Greysia Polii & Apriyani Rahayu) (f)
  - Mixed: China (Zheng Siwei & Huang Yaqiong)
- ~~March 24 – 29~~ Postponed: 2020 India Open in New Delhi
  - Singles: (m) / (f)
  - Doubles: ( & ) (m) / ( & ) (f)
  - Mixed: ( & )
- ~~April 7 – 12~~ Postponed: 2020 Singapore Open in Singapore
  - Singles: (m) / (f)
  - Doubles: ( & ) (m) / ( & ) (f)
  - Mixed: ( & )
- June 9 – 14: 2020 Thailand Open in Bangkok
  - Singles: (m) / (f)
  - Doubles: ( & ) (m) / ( & ) (f)
  - Mixed: ( & )
- September 8 – 13: 2020 Korea Open in (South Korea) Seoul
  - Singles: (m) / (f)
  - Doubles: ( & ) (m) / ( & ) (f)
  - Mixed: ( & )
- November 10 – 15: 2020 Hong Kong Open in Hong Kong
  - Singles: (m) / (f)
  - Doubles: ( & ) (m) / ( & ) (f)
  - Mixed: ( & )

=== Level 5 (Super 300) ===
- January 21 – 26: 2020 Thailand Masters in Bangkok
  - Singles: (Hong Kong) Ng Ka Long (m) / (Japan) Akane Yamaguchi (f)
  - Doubles: Malaysia (Ong Yew Sin & Teo Ee Yi) (m) / China (Chen Qingchen & Jia Yifan) (f)
  - Mixed: England (Marcus Ellis & Lauren Smith)
- February 18 – 23: 2020 Spain Masters in Barcelona
  - Singles: (Denmark) Viktor Axelsen (m) / (Thailand) Pornpawee Chochuwong (f)
  - Doubles: Denmark (Kim Astrup & Anders Skaarup Rasmussen) (m) / Indonesia (Greysia Polii & Apriyani Rahayu) (f)
  - Mixed: South Korea (Kim Sa-rang & Kim Ha-na)
- ~~March 3 – 8~~ Postponed: 2020 German Open in (Germany) Mülheim
  - Singles: (m) / (f)
  - Doubles: ( & ) (m) / ( & ) (f)
  - Mixed: ( & )
- ~~March 17 – 22~~ Postponed: 2020 Swiss Open in (Switzerland) Basel
  - Singles: (m) / (f)
  - Doubles: ( & ) (m) / ( & ) (f)
  - Mixed: ( & )
- ~~April 28 – May 3~~ Postponed: 2020 New Zealand Open in Auckland
  - Singles: (m) / (f)
  - Doubles: ( & ) (m) / ( & ) (f)
  - Mixed: ( & )
- June 2 – 7: 2020 Australian Open in (Australia) Sydney
  - Singles: (m) / (f)
  - Doubles: ( & ) (m) / ( & ) (f)
  - Mixed: ( & )
- June 23 – 28: 2020 U.S. Open in (United States) California
  - Singles: (m) / (f)
  - Doubles: ( & ) (m) / ( & ) (f)
  - Mixed: ( & )
- September 1 – 6: 2020 Chinese Taipei Open in (Taiwan) Taipei
  - Singles: (m) / (f)
  - Doubles: ( & ) (m) / ( & ) (f)
  - Mixed: ( & )
- October 27 – November 1: 2020 Macau Open in Macau
  - Singles: (m) / (f)
  - Doubles: ( & ) (m) / ( & ) (f)
  - Mixed: ( & )
- November 17 – 22: 2020 Syed Modi International in (India) Lucknow
  - Singles: (m) / (f)
  - Doubles: ( & ) (m) / ( & ) (f)
  - Mixed: ( & )
- November 24 – 29: 2020 Korea Masters in (South Korea) Gwangju
  - Singles: (m) / (f)
  - Doubles: ( & ) (m) / ( & ) (f)
  - Mixed: ( & )

=== Level 6 (Super 100) ===
- ~~February 25 – March 1~~ Postponed: 2020 Lingshui China Masters in Lingshui
  - Singles: (m) / (f)
  - Doubles: ( & ) (m) / ( & ) (f)
  - Mixed: ( & )
- ~~March 24 – 29~~ Postponed: 2020 Orléans Masters in (France) Orléans
  - Singles: (m) / (f)
  - Doubles: ( & ) (m) / ( & ) (f)
  - Mixed: ( & )
- June 30 – July 5: 2020 Canada Open in Calgary
  - Singles: (m) / (f)
  - Doubles: ( & ) (m) / ( & ) (f)
  - Mixed: ( & )
- July 7 – 12: 2020 Russian Open in (Russia) Vladivostok
  - Singles: (m) / (f)
  - Doubles: ( & ) (m) / ( & ) (f)
  - Mixed: ( & )
- July 28 – August 2: 2020 Hyderabad Open in (India) Hyderabad
  - Singles: (m) / (f)
  - Doubles: ( & ) (m) / ( & ) (f)
  - Mixed: ( & )
- August 18 – 23: 2020 Akita Masters in (Japan) Akita
  - Singles: (m) / (f)
  - Doubles: ( & ) (m) / ( & ) (f)
  - Mixed: ( & )
- August 25 – 30: 2020 Vietnam Open in Da Nang
  - Singles: (m) / (f)
  - Doubles: ( & ) (m) / ( & ) (f)
  - Mixed: ( & )
- September 29 – October 4: 2020 Indonesia Masters Super 100 in (location TBC)
  - Singles: (m) / (f)
  - Doubles: ( & ) (m) / ( & ) (f)
  - Mixed: ( & )
- October 6 – 11: 2020 Dutch Open in (Netherlands) Almere
  - Singles: (m) / (f)
  - Doubles: ( & ) (m) / ( & ) (f)
  - Mixed: ( & )
- October 27 – November 1: 2020 SaarLorLux Open in (Germany) Saarbrücken
  - Singles: (France) Toma Junior Popov (m) / (Scotland) Kirsty Gilmour (f)
  - Doubles: (Denmark) (Jeppe Bay & Lasse Mølhede) (m) / (Bulgaria) (Gabriela Stoeva & Stefani Stoeva) (f)
  - Mixed: (Denmark) (Mathias Christiansen & Alexandra Bøje)

== Leagues ==
- January 20 – February 9: 2020 Premier Badminton League in India
  - The Bengaluru Raptors defeated the Northeastern Warriors, 4–2, to win their second Premier Badminton League title.
    - Player of the League: (Chinese Taipei) Tai Tzu-ying of Bengaluru Raptors
    - Indian Player of the League: (India) N. Sikki Reddy of Hyderabad Hunters
    - Emerging Player of the League: (India) Priyanshu Rajawat of Hyderabad Hunters

== World University Championships ==
- November 16 – 22: 2020 World University Badminton Championships in (Thailand) Bangkok
  - Singles: (m) / (f)
  - Doubles: ( & ) (m) / ( & ) (f)
  - Mixed: ( & )
  - Team:
