= 2017–18 Premier Badminton League =

Tournament details
- Dates: 23 Dec 2017 – 14 Jan 2018
- Edition: 3
- Location: India
- Official website: www.pbl-india.com

Results
- Champions: Hyderabad Hunters
- Runners-up: Bengaluru Blasters
- Semi-finalists: Ahmedabad Smash Masters, Delhi Dashers

2017–18 Premier Badminton League (also known as Vodafone PBL for sponsorship reasons) was the third edition of Premier Badminton League. It started on 23 December 2017 and concluded on 14 January 2018. It consisted of 20 league ties (each tie consisting of 5 matches) with the top four teams progressing to the knock out stages. The season featured two new teams – Ahmedabad Smash Masters and North Eastern Warriors – bringing the total to eight competing teams. Also, the Delhi team previously known as Delhi Acers will feature as Delhi Dashers.

Hyderabad Hunters were crowned the champions after they beat Bengaluru Blasters 4 - 3 in the final tie.

== Squads ==
Ahmedabad Smash Masters	Awadhe Warriors	Bengaluru Blasters	Chennai Smashers
(India) H. S. Prannoy	(India) Saina Nehwal	(Denmark) Viktor Axelsen	(India) P. V. Sindhu
(India) K. Nandagopal	(Denmark) Christinna Pedersen	(Malaysia) Chong Wei Feng	(India) Aditya Joshi
(Denmark) Kamilla Rytter Juhl	(India) Harshit Aggarwal	(South Korea) Kim Sa-rang	(India) B. Sumeeth Reddy
(Taiwan) Tai Tzu-ying	(Indonesia) Hendra Setiawan	(Scotland) Kirsty Gilmour	(France) Brice Leverdez
(Hong Kong) Lee Chun Hei	(India) Srikanth Kidambi	(India) Manu Attri	(England) Chris Adcock
(India) Siril Verma	(India) Mahima Aggarwal	(Denmark) Mathias Boe	(India) Daniel Farid
(India) Sourabh Varma	(Hong Kong) Or Chin Chung	(India) N. Sikki Reddy	(England) Gabby Adcock
(India) Sri Krishna Priya Kudaravalli	(India) Parupalli Kashyap	(India) Rituparna Das	(Thailand) Tanongsak Saensomboonsuk
(Bulgaria) Stefani Stoeva	(India) Sai Uttejita Rao Chukka	(India) Sanjana Santosh	(India) Vrushali Gummadi
(Hong Kong) Law Cheuk Him	(Hong Kong) Tang Chun Man	(India) Subhankar Dey	(Taiwan) Lee Yang
Delhi Dashers	Hyderabad Hunters	Mumbai Rockets	North Eastern Warriors
(South Korea) Sung Ji-hyun	(Spain) Carolina Marín	(South Korea) Son Wan-ho	(Taiwan) Wang Tzu-wei
(India) Arathi Sara Sunil	(India) Anoushka Parikh	(India) Arjun M.R.	(India) Ajay Jayaram
(India) Ashwini Ponnappa	(India) B. Sai Praneeth	(United States) Zhang Beiwen	(India) Chirag Shetty
(Russia) Ivan Sozonov	(South Korea) Lee Hyun-il	(Malaysia) Tan Boon Heong	(India) Gadde Ruthvika Shivani
(India) Pranav Chopra	(Indonesia) Markis Kido	(Bulgaria) Gabriela Stoeva	(South Korea) Kim Gi-jung
(India) Gurusai Dutt	(Indonesia) Pia Zebadiah Bernadeth	(India) Tarun Kona	(Canada) Michelle Li
(India) Shreyanshi Pardeshi	(India) Rahul Yadav Chittaboina	(India) Kuhoo Garg	(India) Prajakta Sawant
(China) Tian Houwei	(India) Rasika Raje	(South Korea) Lee Yong-dae	(India) Pratul Joshi
(Russia) Vladimir Ivanov	(India) Satwiksairaj Rankireddy	(India) Sameer Verma	(India) Sanyogita Ghorpade
(Hong Kong) Wong Wing Ki	(South Korea) Yoo Yeon-seong	(India) Sanyam Shukla	(South Korea) Shin Baek-cheol

== Points table ==
Team	TP	RMW	RML	TMW	TML	Pts.
Hyderabad Hunters	5	13	7	4	1	20
Ahmedabad Smash Masters	5	10	10	4	1	17
Delhi Dashers	5	11	9	3	2	15
Bengaluru Blasters	5	13	7	2	3	14
Awadhe Warriors	5	8	12	3	2	12
Chennai Smashers	5	8	12	3	2	12
North Eastern Warriors	5	5	15	4	1	12
Mumbai Rockets	5	6	14	3	2	10

- Qualified for knockouts
- Five matches will be played in each tie (TP)
- 1 point for each Regular Match Won (RMW)
- 0 points for Regular Matches Lost (RML)
- 2 points for each Trump Match Won (TMW)
- -1 point for each Trump Match Lost (TML)

Source: Official PBL website

== Fixtures ==
=== League stage ===
Date	Venue	Team 1	Result	Team 2
23 Dec	Guwahati	Chennai Smashers	3 - 4	Awadhe Warriors
24 Dec	Guwahati	North Eastern Warriors	2 - 5	Hyderabad Hunters
25 Dec	Guwahati	Delhi Dashers	1 - 4	Mumbai Rockets
26 Dec	Guwahati	North Eastern Warriors	3 - 4	Ahmedabad Smash Masters
27 Dec	New Delhi	Chennai Smashers	4 - 3	Mumbai Rockets
28 Dec	New Delhi	Delhi Dashers	2 - 5	Bengaluru Blasters
29 Dec	New Delhi	Ahmedabad Smash Masters	4 - 3	Hyderabad Hunters
30 Dec	New Delhi	North Eastern Warriors	3 - 4	Awadhe Warriors
31 Dec	New Delhi	Delhi Dashers	5 - 0	Hyderabad Hunters
1 Jan	Lucknow	Bengaluru Blasters	6 - (-1)	Mumbai Rockets
2 Jan	Lucknow	Awadhe Warriors	4 - 3	Ahmedabad Smash Masters
3 Jan	Lucknow	Chennai Smashers	0 - 3	Delhi Dashers
4 Jan	Lucknow	Awadhe Warriors	1 - 4	Mumbai Rockets
5 Jan	Chennai	Bengaluru Blasters	2 - 3	North Eastern Warriors
6 Jan	Chennai	Chennai Smashers	2 - 1	Ahmedabad Smash Masters
7 Jan	Chennai	Hyderabad Hunters	6 - (-1)	Awadhe Warriors
8 Jan	Chennai	Chennai Smashers	3 - 2	Bengaluru Blasters
9 Jan	Chennai	Mumbai Rockets	0 - 5	Ahmedabad Smash Masters
10 Jan	Hyderabad	Delhi Dashers	4 - 1	North Eastern Warriors
11 Jan	Hyderabad	Hyderabad Hunters	6 - (-1)	Bengaluru Blasters
Semi-finals
12 Jan	Hyderabad	Hyderabad Hunters	3 - 0	Delhi Dashers
13 Jan	Hyderabad	Bengaluru Blasters	4 - 3	Ahmedabad Smash Masters
Finals
14 Jan	Hyderabad	Hyderabad Hunters	4 - 3	Bengaluru Blasters

Source: Official PBL website

=== Knockout stage ===
Semi-finals
12 January
Hyderabad Hunters	3
Delhi Dashers	0
13 January
Bengaluru Blasters	4
Ahmedabad Smash Masters	3

Final
14 January
Hyderabad Hunters	4
Bengaluru Blasters	3

Semifinal 1
Hyderabad Hunters	Bernadeth, Rankireddy	15 - 13, 10 - 15, 10 - 15^{(Mixed Doubles)}	Ponnappa, Ivanov	Delhi Dashers
Hyderabad Hunters	Praneeth	15 - 9, 15 - 8^{(Men's Singles)}	Houwei^{(Trump Match)}	Delhi Dashers
Hyderabad Hunters	Marin^{(Trump Match)}	12 - 15, 15 - 11, 15 - 9^{(Women's Singles)}	Hyun	Delhi Dashers
Hyderabad Hunters	Kido, Seong	–^{(Men's Doubles)}	Sozonov, Ivanov	Delhi Dashers
Hyderabad Hunters	Lee Hyun-Il	–^{(Men's Singles)}	Gurusaidutt	Delhi Dashers

Semifinal 2
Bengaluru Blasters	Feng	2 - 15, 15 - 14, 10 - 15^{(Men's Singles)}	Verma	Ahmedabad Smash Masters
Bengaluru Blasters	Rang, Boe^{(Trump Match)}	15 - 13, 15 - 12^{(Men's Doubles)}	Reginald, Nandagopal	Ahmedabad Smash Masters
Bengaluru Blasters	Gilmour	15 - 8, 13 - 15, 8 - 15^{(Women's Singles)}	Tai^{(Trump Match)}	Ahmedabad Smash Masters
Bengaluru Blasters	Axelsen	15 - 11, 15 - 14^{(Men's Singles)}	Prannoy	Ahmedabad Smash Masters
Bengaluru Blasters	Rang, Reddy	15 - 12, 13 - 15, 15 - 9^{(Mixed Doubles)}	Him, Juhl	Ahmedabad Smash Masters

Final
Hyderabad Hunters	Kido, Seong	9 - 15, 10 - 15^{(Men's Doubles)}	Boe, Rang	Bengaluru Blasters
Hyderabad Hunters	Lee Hyun-Il^{(Trump Match)}	15 - 7, 15 - 13^{(Men's Singles)}	Dey	Bengaluru Blasters
Hyderabad Hunters	Praneeth	8 - 15, 10 - 15^{(Men's Singles)}	Axelsen^{(Trump Match)}	Bengaluru Blasters
Hyderabad Hunters	Marin	15 - 8, 15 - 14^{(Women's Singles)}	Gilmour	Bengaluru Blasters
Hyderabad Hunters	Bernadeth, Rankireddy	15 - 11, 15 - 12^{(Mixed Doubles)}	Rang, Reddy	Bengaluru Blasters
