= 2022 Kolkata Knight Riders season =

Indian Premier League cricket team season

Kolkata Knight Riders
2022 season
- Coach: Brendon McCullum
- Captain: Shreyas Iyer
- Ground(s): Eden Gardens, Kolkata
- 2022 Indian Premier League: 7th
- Most runs: Shreyas Iyer (401)
- Most wickets: Andre Russell (17)

The 2022 season was the 15th season for the Indian Premier League (IPL) franchise Kolkata Knight Riders (KKR). They were one of the ten teams that competed in the 2022 Indian Premier League. The franchise qualified for the IPL playoffs for the first time in 2011 and won the tournament in 2012 and 2014. The franchise also qualified for the playoffs in the three consecutive years of 2016, 2017 and 2018 as well as in 2021 when they were runners up.

== Background ==
The team retained four players from the 2021 season ahead of the 2022 mega-auction.

Retained
Andre Russell, Varun Chakaravarthy, Venkatesh Iyer, Sunil Narine
Acquired during the auction
Nitish Rana, Pat Cummins, Shreyas Iyer, Shivam Mavi, Sheldon Jackson, Ajinkya Rahane, Rinku Singh, Anukul Roy, Rasikh Dar, Baba Indrajith, Chamika Karunaratne, Abhijeet Tomar, Pratham Singh, Ashok Sharma, Sam Billings, Alex Hales, Tim Southee, Ramesh Kumar, Mohammad Nabi, Umesh Yadav, Aman Khan

== Squad ==
- Players with international caps are listed in **bold**.
- Squad strength: 25 (17 - Indian, 8 - overseas)

No.	Name	Nationality	Birth date	Batting style	Bowling style	Year signed	Salary	Notes
Batters
3	**Ajinkya Rahane**	India	6 June 1988 (aged 33)	Right-handed	Right-arm medium	2022	₹1 crore (US$100,000)	
5	**Aaron Finch**	Australia	17 November 1986 (aged 35)	Right-handed	Right-arm medium	2022	₹1.5 crore (US$160,000)	Overseas Replacement for Alex Hales
24	Abhijeet Tomar	India	14 March 1995 (aged 27)	Right-handed	Right-arm off break	2022	₹40 lakh (US$42,000)	
35	Rinku Singh	India	12 October 1997 (aged 24)	Left-handed	Right-arm off break	2022	₹55 lakh (US$57,000)	
41	**Shreyas Iyer**	India	6 December 1994 (aged 27)	Right-handed	Right-arm leg break	2022	₹12.25 crore (US$1.3 million)	Captain
	**Alex Hales**	England	3 January 1989 (aged 33)	Right-handed	Right-arm medium	2022	₹1.5 crore (US$160,000)	Overseas
	Pratham Singh	India	31 August 1992 (aged 29)	Left-handed	Right-arm off break	2022	₹20 lakh (US$21,000)	
	Baba Indrajith	India	8 July 1994 (aged 27)	Right-handed	Right-arm leg break	2022	₹20 lakh (US$21,000)	
	Paras Sharma	India	17 June 2002 (aged 19)	Right-handed	Right-arm medium	2022	₹55 lakh (US$57,000)	
All-rounders
6	Anukul Roy	India	30 November 1998 (aged 23)	Left-handed	Left-arm orthodox	2022	₹20 lakh (US$21,000)	
7	**Mohammad Nabi**	Afghanistan	1 January 1985 (aged 37)	Right-handed	Right-arm off break	2022	₹1 crore (US$100,000)	Overseas
12	**Andre Russell**	West Indies	29 April 1988 (aged 33)	Right-handed	Right-arm fast-medium	2014	₹12 crore (US$1.2 million)	Overseas
23	Aman Hakim Khan	India	23 November 1996 (aged 25)	Right-handed	Right-arm medium	2022	₹20 lakh (US$21,000)	
25	**Venkatesh Iyer**	India	25 December 1994 (aged 27)	Left-handed	Right-arm medium	2021	₹8 crore (US$830,000)	
27	**Nitish Rana**	India	27 December 1993 (aged 28)	Left-handed	Right-arm off break	2018	₹8 crore (US$830,000)	
	**Chamika Karunaratne**	Sri Lanka	29 May 1996 (aged 25)	Right-handed	Right-arm fast-medium	2022	₹50 lakh (US$52,000)	Overseas
Wicket-Keepers
21	Sheldon Jackson	India	27 September 1986 (aged 35)	Right-handed	Right-arm off break	2021	₹60 lakh (US$62,000)	
77	**Sam Billings**	England	15 June 1991 (aged 30)	Right-handed		2022	₹2 crore (US$210,000)	Overseas
Spin bowlers
29	**Varun Chakravarthy**	India	29 August 1991 (aged 30)	Right-handed	Right-arm leg break	2020	₹8 crore (US$830,000)	
74	**Sunil Narine**	West Indies	26 May 1988 (aged 33)	Left-handed	Right-arm off break	2012	₹6 crore (US$620,000)	Overseas
	Ramesh Kumar	India	1 January 1999 (aged 23)	Left-handed	Left-arm orthodox	2022	₹20 lakh (US$21,000)	
Pace bowlers
4	Rasikh Salam	India	5 April 2000 (aged 21)	Right-handed	Right-arm medium	2022	₹20 lakh (US$21,000)	
19	**Umesh Yadav**	India	25 October 1987 (aged 34)	Right-handed	Right-arm fast	2022	₹2 crore (US$210,000)	
22	Harshit Rana	India	22 December 2001 (aged 20)	Right-handed	Right-arm medium	2022	₹20 lakh (US$21,000)	
26	Shivam Mavi	India	26 November 1998 (aged 23)	Right-handed	Right-arm fast-medium	2018	₹7.25 crore (US$750,000)	
30	**Pat Cummins**	Australia	8 May 1993 (aged 28)	Right-handed	Right-arm fast	2020	₹7.25 crore (US$750,000)	Overseas
38	**Tim Southee**	New Zealand	11 December 1988 (aged 33)	Right-handed	Right-arm fast-medium	2022	₹1.5 crore (US$160,000)	Overseas
Source: KKR Players

== Administration and support staff ==
Position	Name
CEO and Managing Director	Venky Mysore
Team manager	Wayne Bentley
Head coach	Brendon McCullum
Assistant coach	Abhishek Nayar
Mentor	David Hussey
Bowling coach	Bharat Arun
Fielding coach	James Foster
Source:KKR Staff

== Kit manufacturers and sponsors ==
Kit manufacturer	Shirt sponsor (chest)	Shirt sponsor (back)	Chest branding
Wrogn Active	WinZo	Unacademy	Lux Cozi
Source :

T20 uniform

== Teams and standings ==
=== Results by match ===
Round	1	2	3	4	5	6	7	8	9	10	11	12	13	14
Teams	CSK	RCB	PBKS	MI	DC	SRH	RR	GT	DC	RR	LSG	MI	SRH	LSG
Result	W	L	W	W	L	L	L	L	L	W	L	W	W	L

Source: Fixtures
W = Win; L = Loss; NR = No Result

=== Point table ===
Pos	Grp	Team	Pld	W	L	NR	Pts	NRR	Qualification
1	B	Gujarat Titans (C)	14	10	4	0	20	0.316	Advanced to Qualifier 1
2	A	Rajasthan Royals (R)	14	9	5	0	18	0.298	Advanced to Qualifier 1
3	A	Lucknow Super Giants (4th)	14	9	5	0	18	0.251	Advanced to Eliminator
4	B	Royal Challengers Bangalore (3rd)	14	8	6	0	16	−0.253	Advanced to Eliminator
5	A	Delhi Capitals	14	7	7	0	14	0.204	
6	B	Punjab Kings	14	7	7	0	14	0.126	
7	A	Kolkata Knight Riders	14	6	8	0	12	0.146	
8	B	Sunrisers Hyderabad	14	6	8	0	12	−0.379	
9	B	Chennai Super Kings	14	4	10	0	8	−0.203	
10	A	Mumbai Indians	14	4	10	0	8	−0.506	

Source: IPLT20.com
(C) Champions; (R) Runners-up
The four top-ranked teams qualified for the playoffs.

== Fixtures ==
Match 1
26 March 2022
19:30 (N)
Scorecard

Chennai Super Kings; 131/5 (20 overs)	v	Kolkata Knight Riders; 133/4 (18.3 overs)
MS Dhoni 50* (38); Umesh Yadav 2/20 (4 overs)		Ajinkya Rahane 44 (34); Dwayne Bravo 3/20 (4 overs)

Kolkata Knight Riders won by 6 wickets
Wankhede Stadium, Mumbai
Umpires: Anil Chaudhary (Ind) and Nitin Menon (Ind)
Player of the match: Umesh Yadav (Kolkata Knight Riders)

- Kolkata Knight Riders won the toss and elected to field.

Match 6
30 March 2022
19:30 (N)
Scorecard

Kolkata Knight Riders; 128 (18.5 overs)	v	Royal Challengers Bangalore; 132/7 (19.2 overs)
Andre Russell 25 (18); Wanindu Hasaranga 4/20 (4 overs)		Sherfane Rutherford 28 (40); Tim Southee 3/20 (4 overs)

Royal Challengers Bangalore won by 3 wickets
DY Patil Stadium, Navi Mumbai
Umpires: Jayaraman Madanagopal (Ind) and Navdeep Singh (Ind)
Player of the match: Wanindu Hasaranga (Royal Challengers Bangalore)

- Royal Challengers Bangalore won the toss and elected to field.

Match 8
1 April 2022
19:30 (N)
Scorecard

Punjab Kings; 137 (18.2 overs)	v	Kolkata Knight Riders; 141/4 (14.3 overs)
Bhanuka Rajapaksa 31 (9); Umesh Yadav 4/23 (4 overs)		Andre Russell 70* (31); Rahul Chahar 2/13 (4 overs)

Kolkata Knight Riders won by 6 wickets
Wankhede Stadium, Mumbai
Umpires: Anil Chaudhary (Ind) and Saiyed Khalid (Ind)
Player of the match: Umesh Yadav (Kolkata Knight Riders)

- Kolkata Knight Riders won the toss and elected to field.

Match 14
6 April 2022
19:30 (N)
Scorecard

Mumbai Indians; 161/4 (20 overs)	v	Kolkata Knight Riders; 162/5 (16 overs)
Suryakumar Yadav 52 (36); Pat Cummins 2/49 (4 overs)		Pat Cummins 56* (15); Murugan Ashwin 2/25 (3 overs)

Kolkata Knight Riders won by 5 wickets
MCA International Stadium, Pune
Umpires: K. N. Ananthapadmanabhan (Ind) and Bruce Oxenford (Aus)
Player of the match: Pat Cummins (Kolkata Knight Riders)

- Kolkata Knight Riders won the toss and elected to field.
- Pat Cummins (Kolkata Knight Riders) scored the joint-fastest half-century in the IPL (14 balls).

Match 19
10 April 2022
15:30 (D/N)
Scorecard

Delhi Capitals; 215/5 (20 overs)	v	Kolkata Knight Riders; 171 (19.4 overs)
David Warner 61 (45); Sunil Narine 2/21 (4 overs)		Shreyas Iyer 54 (33); Kuldeep Yadav 4/35 (4 overs)

Delhi Capitals won by 44 runs
Brabourne Stadium, Mumbai
Umpires: Chris Gaffaney (NZ) and Jayaraman Madanagopal (Ind)
Player of the match: Kuldeep Yadav (Delhi Capitals)

- Kolkata Knight Riders won the toss and elected to field.

Match 25
15 April 2022
19:30 (N)
Scorecard

Kolkata Knight Riders; 175/8 (20 overs)	v	Sunrisers Hyderabad; 176/3 (17.5 overs)
Nitish Rana 54 (36); T. Natarajan 3/37 (4 overs)		Rahul Tripathi 71 (37); Andre Russell 2/20 (2 overs)

Sunrisers Hyderabad won by 7 wickets
Brabourne Stadium, Mumbai
Umpires: Sadashiv Iyer (Ind) and Virender Sharma (Ind)
Player of the match: Rahul Tripathi (Sunrisers Hyderabad)

- Sunrisers Hyderabad won the toss and elected to field.

Match 30
18 April 2022
19:30 (N)
Scorecard

Rajasthan Royals; 217/5 (20 overs)	v	Kolkata Knight Riders; 210 (19.4 overs)
Jos Buttler 103 (61); Sunil Narine 2/21 (4 overs)		Shreyas Iyer 85 (51); Yuzvendra Chahal 5/40 (4 overs)

Rajasthan Royals won by 7 runs
Brabourne Stadium, Mumbai
Umpires: Sadashiv Iyer (Ind) and Virender Sharma (Ind)
Player of the match: Yuzvendra Chahal (Rajasthan Royals)

- Kolkata Knight Riders won the toss and elected to field.
- Yuzvendra Chahal (Rajasthan Royals) took a hat-trick and a five-wicket haul.

Match 35
23 April 2022
15:30 (D/N)
Scorecard

Gujarat Titans; 156/9 (20 overs)	v	Kolkata Knight Riders; 148/8 (20 overs)
Hardik Pandya 67 (49); Andre Russell 4/5 (1 over)		Andre Russell 48 (25); Mohammed Shami 2/20 (4 overs)

Gujarat Titans won by 8 runs
DY Patil Stadium, Navi Mumbai
Umpires: Ulhas Gandhe (Ind) and K. N. Ananthapadmanabhan (Ind)
Player of the match: Rashid Khan (Gujarat Titans)

- Gujarat Titans won the toss and elected to bat.

Match 41
28 April 2022
19:30 (N)
Scorecard

Kolkata Knight Riders; 146/9 (20 overs)	v	Delhi Capitals; 150/6 (19 overs)
Nitish Rana 57 (34); Kuldeep Yadav 4/14 (3 overs)		David Warner 42 (26); Umesh Yadav 3/24 (4 overs)

Delhi Capitals won by 4 wickets
Wankhede Stadium, Mumbai
Umpires: Anil Chaudhary (Ind) and Pashchim Pathak (Ind)
Player of the match: Kuldeep Yadav (Delhi Capitals)

- Delhi Capitals won the toss and elected to field.
- Harshit Rana (Kolkata Knight Riders) made his T20 debut.

Match 47
2 May 2022
19:30 (N)
Scorecard

Rajasthan Royals; 152/5 (20 overs)	v	Kolkata Knight Riders; 158/3 (19.1 overs)
Sanju Samson 54 (49); Tim Southee 2/46 (4 overs)		Nitish Rana 48* (37); Trent Boult 1/25 (4 overs)

Kolkata Knight Riders won by 7 wickets
Wankhede Stadium, Mumbai
Umpires: Jayaraman Madanagopal (Ind) and Nitin Pandit (Ind)
Player of the match: Rinku Singh (Kolkata Knight Riders)

- Kolkata Knight Riders won the toss and elected to field.

Match 53
7 May 2022
19:30 (N)
Scorecard

Lucknow Super Giants; 176/7 (20 overs)	v	Kolkata Knight Riders; 101 (14.3 overs)
Quinton de Kock 50 (29); Andre Russell 2/22 (3 overs)		Andre Russell 45 (19); Avesh Khan 3/19 (3 overs)

Lucknow Super Giants won by 75 runs
MCA International Stadium, Pune
Umpires: Anil Chaudhary (Ind) and Michael Gough (Eng)
Player of the match: Avesh Khan (Lucknow Super Giants)

- Kolkata Knight Riders won the toss and elected to field.

Match 56
9 May 2022
19:30 (N)
Scorecard

Kolkata Knight Riders; 165/9 (20 overs)	v	Mumbai Indians; 113 (17.3 overs)
Venkatesh Iyer 43 (24); Jasprit Bumrah 5/10 (4 overs)		Ishan Kishan 51 (43); Pat Cummins 3/22 (4 overs)

Kolkata Knight Riders won by 52 runs
DY Patil Stadium, Navi Mumbai
Umpires: Sadashiv Iyer (Ind) and Bruce Oxenford (Aus)
Player of the match: Jasprit Bumrah (Mumbai Indians)

- Mumbai Indians won the toss and elected to field.

Match 61
14 May 2022
19:30 (N)
Scorecard

Kolkata Knight Riders; 177/6 (20 overs)	v	Sunrisers Hyderabad; 123/8 (20 overs)
Andre Russell 49* (28); Umran Malik 3/33 (4 overs)		Abhishek Sharma 43 (28); Andre Russell 3/22 (4 overs)

Kolkata Knight Riders won by 54 runs
MCA International Stadium, Pune
Umpires: K. N. Ananthapadmanabhan (Ind) and Anil Chaudhary (Ind)
Player of the match: Andre Russell (Kolkata Knight Riders)

- Kolkata Knight Riders won the toss and elected to bat.

Match 66
18 May 2022
19:30 (N)
Scorecard

Lucknow Super Giants; 210/0 (20 overs)	v	Kolkata Knight Riders; 208/8 (20 overs)
Quinton de Kock 140* (70)		Shreyas Iyer 50 (29); Mohsin Khan 3/20 (4 overs)

Lucknow Super Giants won by 2 runs
DY Patil Stadium, Navi Mumbai
Umpires: Yeshwant Barde (Ind) and Rohan Pandit (Ind)
Player of the match: Quinton de Kock (Lucknow Super Giants)

- Lucknow Super Giants won the toss and elected to bat.
- Lucknow Super Giants qualified for the playoffs and Kolkata Knight Riders were eliminated as a result of this match.

== Statistics ==
=== Most runs ===
No.	Name	Match	Inns	NO	Runs	HS	Ave.	BF	SR	100s	50s	4s	6s
1	Shreyas Iyer	14	14	1	401	85	30.85	401	134.56	0	3	41	11
2	Nitish Rana	14	14	1	361	57	27.77	251	143.82	0	2	29	22
3	Andre Russell	14	12	3	335	70*	37.22	192	174.47	0	1	18	32
4	Venkatesh Iyer	12	12	1	182	50*	16.55	169	107.69	0	1	17	7
5	Rinku Singh	7	7	2	174	42*	34.80	117	148.71	0	0	17	7
6	Sam Billings	8	8	1	169	36	24.14	138	122.46	0	0	9	10
7	Ajinkya Rahane	7	7	0	133	44	19.00	128	103.90	0	0	14	4
8	Aaron Finch	5	5	0	86	58	17.20	61	140.98	0	1	10	3
9	Sunil Narine	14	10	2	71	22	8.88	40	177.50	0	0	6	6
10	Pat Cummins	5	5	1	63	56*	15.75	24	262.50	0	1	5	6

- Source: https://www.iplt20.com/stats/

=== Most wickets ===
No.	Name	Match	Inns	Overs	Maidens	Runs	Wickets	BBI	Avg.	Econ.	SR	4W	5W
1	Andre Russell	14	13	28.1	0	278	17	4/5	16.35	9.86	9.94	1	0
2	Umesh Yadav	12	12	48.0	2	339	16	4/23	21.18	7.06	18.00	1	0
3	Tim Southee	9	9	35.0	0	275	14	3/20	19.64	7.85	15.00	0	0
4	Sunil Narine	14	14	56.0	0	312	9	2/21	34.66	5.57	37.33	0	0
5	Pat Cummins	5	5	19.5	0	212	7	3/22	30.28	10.68	17.00	0	0
6	Varun Chakravarthy	11	11	39.0	0	332	6	1/22	55.33	8.51	39.00	0	0
6	Shivam Mavi	6	6	22.0	0	227	5	1/33	45.40	10.31	26.40	0	0
8	Anukul Roy	2	2	7.0	0	55	1	1/28	55.00	7.85	42.0	0	0
9	Harshit Rana	2	2	5	0	51	1	1/24	51.00	10.20	30.00	0	0

- Source: https://www.iplt20.com/stats/
