= Pune 7 Aces =

Badminton club in India

- Sport: Badminton
- Founded: 2018
- First season: 2018–19
- League: Premier Badminton League
- Based in: Pune, India
- Home ground: Shree Shiv Chhatrapati Sports Complex
- Colors
- Owner: Tapsee Pannu, KRI Entertainment
- Head coach: Mathias Boe
- PBL wins: none
- Website: www.7acespune.com

Pune 7 Aces (or 7 ACES – Pune) is a franchise badminton team based in Pune that plays in the Premier Badminton League. The franchise was formed in 2018 and has competed only in the season of 2018–19. The team is owned by Indian actress Tapsee Pannu and KRI Entertainment. The team is coached by Mathias Boe.

== Current squad ==
The squad for the PBL season five is:

=== Indian players ===
- (India) Arjun M.R.
- (India) Chirag Shetty
- (India) Mithun Manjunath
- (India) Rituparna Das

=== Overseas players ===
- (England) Chris Adcock
- (England) Gabby Adcock
- (Hong Kong) Tse Ying Suet
- (Indonesia) Hendra Setiawan
- (Japan) Kazumasa Sakai
- (Singapore) Loh Kean Yew
- (Malaysia) Lee Zii Jia
- (Vietnam) Vũ Thị Trang

== Season 4 ==
Season four of PBL was the first season for Pune 7 Aces. The team had Olympic Champion Carolina Marin in their squad for the season. They finished fifth.

=== Squad ===
Squad that played season four:

Squad

- (Spain) Carolina Marín
- (India) Chirag Shetty
- (Denmark) Mathias Boe
- (Russia) Vladimir Ivanov
- (Denmark) Line Kjærsfeldt
- (India) Lakshya Sen
- (France) Brice Leverdez
- (Indonesia) Sony Dwi Kuncoro
- (India) Ajay Jayaram
- (India) Prajakta Sawant

=== Results ===
Date	Venue	Team 1	Result	Team 2
22 Dec	Mumbai	Pune 7 Aces	(-1) – 6	Hyderabad Hunters
24 Dec	Mumbai	Pune 7 Aces	3 – 4	Awadhe Warriors
29 Dec	Pune	Pune 7 Aces	4 – 3	Mumbai Rockets
30 Dec	Pune	Pune 7 Aces	3 – 4	Bengaluru Raptors
3 Jan	Ahmedabad	Pune 7 Aces	3 – 4	Chennai Smashers
6 Jan	Ahmedabad	Delhi Dashers	0 – 5	Pune 7 Aces
