= Ramesh Kumar (cricketer) =

Indian cricketer (born 1999)

Personal information
- Born: 1 January 1999 (age 27)
- Batting: Left-handed
- Bowling: Slow left-arm orthodox
- Source: ESPNcricinfo, 14 February 2022

Ramesh Kumar (born 1 January 1999) is an Indian cricketer who was signed by Kolkata Knight Riders in IPL. He is a left-handed batsman and left-arm spin bowler.

== Early life ==
Ramesh Kumar was born on 1 January 1999 in Jalalabad, Punjab. His family had migrated from Hanumangarh, Rajasthan, to Jalalabad, Punjab.

== Indian Premier League ==
In February 2022, he was bought by the Kolkata Knight Riders team for the 2022 Indian Premier League.
