= 2020 Indian Premier League final =

Cricket match

- Event: 2020 Indian Premier League
Delhi Capitals	Mumbai Indians
156/7	157/5
20 overs	18.4 overs
- Mumbai Indians won by 5 wickets
- Date: 10 November 2020
- Venue: Dubai International Cricket Stadium, Dubai
- Player of the match: Trent Boult (MI)
- Umpires: Chris Gaffaney (NZ); Nitin Menon (Ind)
- Attendance: 0 (behind closed doors)

The 2020 Indian Premier League final was played on 10 November 2020 between the Mumbai Indians and the Delhi Capitals at Dubai International Cricket Stadium, Dubai. It was a Day/Night Twenty20 match, which decided the winner of 2020 season of the Indian Premier League (IPL), an annual Twenty20 tournament in India. The defending champions, the Mumbai Indians, retained the title by winning the match by five wickets. This was the fifth IPL title for the Mumbai Indians. This was the first IPL final appearance for the Delhi Capitals.

== Background ==
In July 2020, after the International Cricket Council (ICC) postponed the 2020 edition of the Men's T20 World Cup, the BCCI requested to host the tournament in the United Arab Emirates from 26 September to 8 November 2020. On 24 July 2020, it was confirmed that the tournament would start on 19 September 2020. On 25 October 2020, the BCCI announced the venues for the playoffs. Two of the three venues for the IPL were selected for playoffs, with Dubai hosting the final. The other venue of the tournament, Sharjah, hosted the 2020 Women's T20 Challenge instead.

== Road to the final ==
Delhi Capitals			vs	Mumbai Indians
League Stage
Opponent	Scorecard	Result	Titles	Opponent	Scorecard	Result
Kings XI Punjab	20 September 2020	Won	Match 1	Chennai Super Kings	19 September 2020	Lost
Chennai Super Kings	25 September 2020	Won	Match 2	Kolkata Knight Riders	23 September 2020	Won
Sunrisers Hyderabad	29 September 2020	Lost	Match 3	Royal Challengers Bangalore	28 September 2020	Lost
Kolkata Knight Riders	03 October 2020	Won	Match 4	Kings XI Punjab	01 October 2020	Won
Royal Challengers Bangalore	05 October 2020	Won	Match 5	Sunrisers Hyderabad	04 October 2020	Won
Rajasthan Royals	09 October 2020	Won	Match 6	Rajasthan Royals	06 October 2020	Won
Mumbai Indians	11 October 2020	Lost	Match 7	Delhi Capitals	11 October 2020	Won
Rajasthan Royals	14 October 2020	Won	Match 8	Kolkata Knight Riders	16 October 2020	Won
Chennai Super Kings	17 October 2020	Won	Match 9	Kings XI Punjab	18 October 2020	Lost
Kings XI Punjab	20 October 2020	Lost	Match 10	Chennai Super Kings	23 October 2020	Won
Kolkata Knight Riders	24 October 2020	Lost	Match 11	Rajasthan Royals	25 October 2020	Lost
Sunrisers Hyderabad	27 October 2020	Lost	Match 12	Royal Challengers Bangalore	28 October 2020	Won
Mumbai Indians	31 October 2020	Lost	Match 13	Delhi Capitals	31 October 2020	Won
Royal Challengers Bangalore	02 November 2020	Won	Match 14	Sunrisers Hyderabad	03 November 2020	Lost
Playoff stage
Qualifier 1				Qualifier 1
Opponent	Scorecard	Result	Titles	Opponent	Scorecard	Result
Mumbai Indians	05 November 2020	Lost	Match 15	Delhi Capitals	05 November 2020	Won
Qualifier 2
Opponent	Scorecard	Result	Titles
Sunrisers Hyderabad	08 November 2020	Won	Match 16
2020 Indian Premier League final

=== Group stage ===
The Mumbai Indians were ranked first in the league table, though their season started with a loss to the Chennai Super Kings. After losing two of their first three games, Mumbai won five consecutive matches, before their run was ended by a loss against the Kings XI Punjab. After that match, Mumbai won three of their next five matches, thus ending their season with nine wins and five losses and qualifying for the playoffs.

The Delhi Capitals started their campaign with a super over win against the Kings XI Punjab. Their first loss came in their third match, against the Sunrisers Hyderabad. They had a successful first half, winning five matches out of seven. However, they won only three games in the second half of the season, a phase which included four consecutive losses. A win in the last match against the Royal Challengers Bangalore meant that they had qualified for the playoffs, also ensuring a top-two finish.

=== Group stage series ===
11 October
19:30 (D/N)
Scorecard

Delhi Capitals; 162/4 (20 overs)	v	Mumbai Indians; 166/5 (19.4 overs)

Mumbai won by 5 wickets
Sheikh Zayed Cricket Stadium, Abu Dhabi

31 October
15:30
Scorecard

Delhi Capitals; 110/9 (20 overs)	v	Mumbai Indians; 111/1 (14.2 overs)

Mumbai won by 9 wickets
Dubai International Cricket Stadium, Dubai

Mumbai won both the league stage matches between the finalists, winning the first match by 5 wickets and the second match by 9 wickets. The Player of the Match in these two games were Quinton de Kock and Ishan Kishan respectively.

=== Playoffs ===
The playoff stage of IPL was played according to the Page playoff system and provided Mumbai and Delhi, being the top and second-ranked teams, with two chances for qualifying for the Final. These teams first faced each other in Qualifier 1, with Mumbai, as the winners, qualifying directly for the final; Delhi, as the loser of Qualifier 1, played against the winner of the Eliminator in Qualifier 2, with the winner of that match qualifying for the final.

5 November
19:30
Scorecard

Mumbai Indians; 200/5 (20 overs)	v	Delhi Capitals; 143/8 (20 overs)

Mumbai won by 57 runs
Dubai International Cricket Stadium, Dubai

In Qualifier 1, Delhi won the toss and chose to bowl. Mumbai scored 200/5 in their 20 overs, with Ishan Kishan top-scoring with 55*. Ravichandran Ashwin was the best bowler for Delhi, ending with the figures of 3/29. In reply, Delhi could only manage 143/8 and lost the game by 57 runs. Marcus Stoinis top-scored for Delhi with 65 while Jasprit Bumrah took 4/14 for Mumbai and was the Player of the Match. As a result, the Mumbai Indians qualified for the final for sixth time.

The Sunrisers Hyderabad won against Royal Challengers Bangalore in the Eliminator to set up a match against Delhi to decide the second finalist.

8 November
19:30 (D/N)
Scorecard

Delhi Capitals; 189/3 (20 overs)	v	Sunrisers Hyderabad; 172/8 (20 overs)

Delhi won by 17 runs
Sheikh Zayed Cricket Stadium, Abu Dhabi

In Qualifier 2, Delhi won the toss and chose to bat. They scored 189/3 in their 20 overs; Shikhar Dhawan top-scored with 72. Rashid Khan had Hyderabad's best bowling figures with 1/26 in his four overs. In reply, Hyderabad could only manage 172/8 and lost the game by 17 runs. Kane Williamson was Hyderabad's top-scorer with 67. Kagiso Rabada had Delhi's best bowling figures with 4/29 and received the Purple Cap (for the tournament leading wicket taker) at the end of the match. Marcus Stoinis was the Player of the Match for his all-round performance. Delhi thus qualified for their first IPL final.

== Match ==
=== Summary ===
Shreyas Iyer, the captain of the Delhi Capitals, won the toss and elected to bat. The Delhi Capitals scored 156 runs for the loss of seven wickets. The Mumbai Indians chased down the target with eight balls and five wickets to spare, scoring 157 runs. The Mumbai Indians' fast bowler Trent Boult was named the Player of the Match for his decisive spell of three wickets for 30 runs.

==== Delhi Capitals innings ====
The Delhi Capitals team innings started off with a first-ball wicket from New Zealand left-arm fast bowler Trent Boult, who dismissed Marcus Stoinis, caught behind the wickets by Quinton de Kock. Boult followed it quickly with a similar dismissal of Indian right-hand batsman Ajinkya Rahane for a score of 2. The middle order was stabilised by a 96-run partnership between captain Shreyas Iyer and wicketkeeper batsman Rishabh Pant, taking the team to 118 for the loss of four wickets at the end of the 15th over, at a run rate of 7.8 runs per over. Pant was dismissed for 56 off the bowling of Australian right-arm fast bowler Nathan Coulter-Nile and caught by Hardik Pandya. The team went on to score 38 runs in the remaining five overs at a run rate of 7.6 to score a total of 156 runs for the loss of seven wickets. Captain Iyer ended the innings not out on a score of 65. For the Mumbai Indians, Boult ended his bowling spell with a total of three wickets, conceding 30 runs in his allocated four overs, while Coulter-Nile picked up two wickets, conceding 29 runs in his four overs.

==== Mumbai Indians innings ====
Chasing a target of 157, the Mumbai Indians innings got off to a healthy start with a partnership of 45 runs in four overs between the captain Rohit Sharma and left-handed batsman Quinton de Kock, before De Kock was out, caught behind by wicket keeper Rishabh Pant off the bowling of right-arm medium-pace bowler Marcus Stoinis. The rest of the team did not have any significant hold-ups in chasing down the target, led by Sharma, who scored 68 off 51 balls, before he was caught out by substitute fielder Lalit Yadav off the bowling of South African right-arm fast bowler Anrich Nortje. With the team requiring 20 runs from 22 balls, they were comfortably seen through by Ishan Kishan and Krunal Pandya. In the end, the team got to the target with eight balls and five wickets to spare.

=== Scorecard ===
- On-field umpires: Chris Gaffaney (NZ) and Nitin Menon (Ind)
- Third umpire: Anil Chaudhary (Ind)
- Reserve umpire: K. N. Ananthapadmanabhan (Ind)
- Match referee: Javagal Srinath (Ind)
- Toss: Delhi Capitals won the toss and elected to bat.

Delhi Capitals innings
Batsman	Method of dismissal	Runs	Balls	Strike rate
Marcus Stoinis	c de Kock† b Boult	0	1	0.00
Shikhar Dhawan	b Jayant	15	13	115.38
Ajinkya Rahane	c de Kock† b Boult	2	4	50.00
Shreyas Iyer*	not out	65	50	130.00
Rishabh Pant†	c Hardik b Coulter-Nile	56	38	147.37
Shimron Hetmyer	c Coulter-Nile b Boult	5	5	100.00
Axar Patel	c (sub) A Roy b Coulter-Nile	9	9	100.00
Kagiso Rabada	run out (Suryakumar Yadav/ Coulter-Nile)	0	0	0.00
Ravichandran Ashwin	did not bat			
Praveen Dubey	did not bat			
Anrich Nortje	did not bat			
Extras	(1lb, 3wd)	4		
Totals	(20 overs, 7.80 runs per over)	156/7		

Fall of wickets: 1–0 (Stoinis, 0.1 overs), 2–16 (Rahane, 2.4 overs), 3–22 (Dhawan, 3.3 overs), 4–118 (Pant, 14.6 overs), 5–137 (Hetmyer, 17.2 overs), 6–149 (Patel, 19.2 overs), 7–156 (Rabada, 19.6 overs)

Mumbai Indians bowling
Bowler	Overs	Maidens	Runs	Wickets	Economy
Trent Boult	4	0	30	3	7.50
Jasprit Bumrah	4	0	28	0	7.00
Jayant Yadav	4	0	25	1	6.25
Nathan Coulter-Nile	4	0	29	2	7.25
Krunal Pandya	3	0	30	0	10.00
Kieron Pollard	1	0	13	0	13.00

Mumbai Indians innings
Batsman	Method of dismissal	Runs	Balls	Strike rate
Rohit Sharma*	c (sub) Lalit Yadav b Nortje	68	51	133.33
Quinton de Kock†	c Pant† b Stoinis	20	12	166.67
Suryakumar Yadav	run out (Dubey/ Pant)	19	20	95.00
Ishan Kishan	not out	33	19	173.70
Kieron Pollard	b Rabada	9	4	225.00
Hardik Pandya	c Rahane b Nortje	3	5	60.00
Krunal Pandya	not out	1	1	100.00
Nathan Coulter-Nile	did not bat			
Jayant Yadav	did not bat			
Trent Boult	did not bat			
Jasprit Bumrah	did not bat			
Extras	(4lb)	4		
Totals	(18.4 overs, 8.41 runs per over)	157/5		

Fall of wickets: 1–45 (de Kock, 4.1 overs), 2–90 (Suryakumar, 10.5 overs), 3–137 (Rohit, 16.2 overs), 4–147 (Pollard, 17.1 overs), 5–156 (Hardik, 18.3 overs)

Delhi Capitals bowling
Bowler	Overs	Maidens	Runs	Wickets	Economy
Ravichandran Ashwin	4	0	28	0	7.00
Kagiso Rabada	3	0	32	1	10.70
Anrich Nortje	2.4	0	25	2	9.40
Marcus Stoinis	2	0	23	1	11.50
Axar Patel	4	0	16	0	4.00
Praveen Dubey	3	0	29	0	9.70
