= Shreyas Iyer =

Indian cricketer (born 1994)

- Shreyas Iyer in 2026

Personal information
- Full name: Shreyas Santosh Iyer
- Born: 6 December 1994 (age 31); Bombay, Maharashtra, India
- Nickname: Sarpanch Saab
- Batting: Right-handed
- Bowling: Right-arm leg break
- Role: Middle-order batter

International information
- National side: India (2017–present)
- Test debut (cap 303): 25 November 2021 v New Zealand
- Last Test: 2 February 2024 v England
- ODI debut (cap 219): 10 December 2017 v Sri Lanka
- Last ODI: 4 November 2026 v New Zealand
- ODI shirt no.: 96
- T20I debut (cap 70): 1 November 2017 v New Zealand
- Last T20I: 1 November 2026 v New Zealand
- T20I shirt no.: 96

Domestic team information
- Years: Team
- 2013–present: Mumbai
- 2015–2021: Delhi Capitals
- 2022–2024: Kolkata Knight Riders
- 2025–present: Punjab Kings

Career statistics
Competition	Test	ODI	T20I	FC
Matches	14	82	77	83
Runs scored	811	3,136	1,820	6,408
Batting average	36.86	45.45	31.38	47.82
100s/50s	1/5	5/24	1/11	15/33
Top score	105	128*	102*	233
Catches/stumpings	15/–	32/–	22/–	65/–
Medal record
Men's cricket
Representing India
ICC Cricket World Cup
Runner-up	2023 India
ICC Champions Trophy
Winner	2025 Pakistan
ACC Asia Cup
Winner	2023 Pakistan
Asian Games
Gold medal – first place	2026 Aichi-Nagoya
ACC U19 Asia Cup
Winner	2013–14 UAE
- Source: Cricinfo, 1 November 2026

Shreyas Santosh Iyer (born 6 December 1994) is an Indian international cricketer who plays for the India national team. Iyer captains India in T20Is and serves as the vice-captain in ODIs. A right-handed batter, he primarily plays as a top-order or middle-order batter across formats. Iyer also captains Mumbai in domestic cricket and captains the Punjab Kings in the Indian Premier League (IPL).

Iyer made his international debut in 2017 and has been a regular member of India's limited-overs teams. He achieved a notable milestone on his Test debut against New Zealand in November 2021, scoring a century in the first innings and a half-century in the second, becoming the first Indian player to record both on Test debut. Earlier in his career, he represented the India Under-19s at the 2014 Under-19 Cricket World Cup.

In major international tournaments, Iyer was part of the Indian squad that finished runners-up at the 2023 Cricket World Cup, during which he scored a century against New Zealand in the semi-final at the Wankhede. He was also a member of the teams that won the 2023 Asia Cup and the 2025 ICC Champions Trophy. For his performances, he was named ICC Men's Player of the Month in February 2022 and March 2025.

In the IPL, Iyer began his career with the then Delhi Daredevils (now Delhi Capitals) in 2015, winning the Emerging Player of the Year award in his debut season, and played for them till 2021. He later captained the Kolkata Knight Riders from 2022 to 2024, leading them to the IPL title in 2024. In 2025, he was signed by the Punjab Kings for ₹26.75 crore (equivalent to ₹28 crore or US$3.0 million in 2026), briefly becoming the most expensive player in IPL auction history before the record was surpassed in the same auction. He led the team to the finals in the Indian Premier League 2025, ending as the runner-ups.

On 6 June 2026 Shreyas Iyer became India's 15th T20I captain replacing Suryakumar Yadav. On 6 October 2026, Iyer scored his maiden T20I century, an unbeaten 102 against the West Indies in Lucknow.

== Early life ==
Shreyas Santosh Iyer was born on 6 December 1994 in Chembur, Bombay, India. His father, Santosh, is a Tamil speaker from Thrissur, Kerala, and his mother, Rohini, is a Tulu speaker from Mangalore, Karnataka. He was educated at Don Bosco High School, Matunga and at Ramniranjan Anandilal Podar College of Commerce and Economics, Mumbai.

Despite growing up in Maharashtra, Iyer has remained connected to his roots, he can speak his mother tongue Tamil, Marathi, and Hindi.

At the age of 18, Iyer was spotted by coach Pravin Amre at the Shivaji Park Gymkhana, who trained him in his early cricketing days. Iyer's teammates at the age group levels used to compare him to Virender Sehwag. During his graduation from Podar College, Iyer helped his college team win six trophies.

== Domestic career ==
In 2014, Iyer represented the Trent Bridge Cricket Team. During a trip to the UK, he played three matches, scoring 297 runs and averaging 99 runs per game. He set a new team record with a highest score of 171.

Iyer made his List A debut for Mumbai in November 2014, playing in the 2014–15 Vijay Hazare Trophy. He scored 273 runs in that tournament at an average of 54.60. Iyer made his first-class cricket debut in December 2014 during the 2014–15 Ranji Trophy. He scored a total of 809 runs at an average of 50.56 in his debut Ranji season, including two centuries and six fifties. He was 7th highest scorer of the 2014–15 Ranji Trophy.

In the 2015–16 Ranji Trophy, Iyer scored 1,321 runs at an average of 73.39, including four centuries and seven fifties, becoming the top scorer of the Ranji season and the second player to score 1,300 runs in a single Ranji Trophy competition. In the 2016–17 Ranji Trophy, Iyer scored 725 runs at an average of 42.64, including two centuries and two fifties. He scored 202 not out off 210 balls against the visiting Australia team in a 3-Day Practice match in Mumbai, his highest first-class score.

In September 2018, Iyer was named the vice-captain of Mumbai for the 2018–19 Vijay Hazare Trophy tournament. He was the leading run-scorer for Mumbai in the tournament, with 373 runs in seven matches. In October 2018, Iyer was named the captain of India B's squad for the 2018–19 Deodhar Trophy. He was also the leading run-scorer in that tournament, with 199 runs in three matches.

In February 2019, in the opening round of the 2018–19 Syed Mushtaq Ali Trophy tournament, Iyer made the highest score by an Indian batsman in a T20 match, scoring 147 runs.

In March 2021, Iyer was signed by Lancashire for their 2021 season of the Royal London One-Day Cup, but, in July 2021, Iyer opted out of the tournament to recover from an injury.

In February 2024, the Board of Control for Cricket in India (BCCI) mandated Iyer to participate in the 2023-24 Ranji Trophy. Iyer did not play in the quarter-final against Baroda citing back issues. Subsequently, Iyer lost his BCCI central contract. Later, Iyer appeared in the semifinal against Tamil Nadu and the final against Vidharbha, as Mumbai went on to win the Ranji Trophy.

== Franchise career ==
Indian Premier League Career Statistics
Season	Team	Inns.	Runs
2015	Delhi Daredevils	14	439
2016	Delhi Daredevils	6	30
2017	Delhi Daredevils	12	338
2018	Delhi Daredevils	14	411
2019	Delhi Capitals	16	463
2020	Delhi Capitals	17	519
2021	Delhi Capitals	8	175
2022	Kolkata Knight Riders	14	401
2024	Kolkata Knight Riders	14	351
2025	Punjab Kings	17	604
2026	Punjab Kings	13	498
Last Updated: 3 June 2025; Source: iplt20.com

In February 2015, Iyer was signed in the 2015 IPL players auction by the Delhi Daredevils for ₹2.6 crore (approximately $430,000). Thus Iyer became the highest-earning uncapped player in the tournament. He scored 439 runs in 14 matches, with a 33.76 average and a strike rate of 128.36, and was named the Emerging Player of 2015 IPL.

Delhi Daredevils retained Iyer in the 2018 IPL Auction. On 25 April 2018, he was announced as the new captain of Delhi Daredevils replacing Gautam Gambhir. On 27 April 2018, he became the youngest captain to lead the Delhi Daredevils team in IPL history at the age of 23 years and 142 days during the match against Kolkata Knight Riders and was also the fourth overall youngest to captain any IPL team. On his IPL captaincy debut, Shreyas Iyer smashed an unbeaten match-winning knock of 93 off 40 deliveries with 10 sixes, which was his third successive IPL fifty of the season to power DD to a heavy total of 219/5 in the first innings of the match before earning him the man of the match award. Under his captaincy, Delhi Daredevils managed to defeat KKR by 55 runs to secure only their second win of the tournament. Iyer was retained by the Delhi Capitals in the IPL 2019 season, in which he led the team into the playoffs for the first time after seven years.

In the 2020 season, he continued as the captain for Delhi Capitals and he also led them to their maiden IPL final against the Mumbai Indians. Iyer scored an unbeaten 65 off 50 balls in a losing effort as Mumbai Indians won the final.

He missed half of the 2021 IPL season due to an injury in his left shoulder while playing for India in the first match of an ODI series against England in the same year. He returned after six months for Delhi Capitals. In the 2022 IPL Auction, Iyer was bought by the Kolkata Knight Riders for ₹12.25 crore. He was also named as the team's captain. Despite having a bad season as captain with the franchise finishing 7th, he scored 401 runs in that year, the most for the franchise that year. In 2023, he was unavailable for the whole season due to a back injury, with Nitish Rana serving as the captain for that season.

He returned as the captain of the Kolkata Knight Riders ahead of the 2024 season. He led the team to the top position of the league stage table. In the final, Kolkata Knight Riders beat Sunrisers Hyderabad by 8 wickets to lift their third IPL title. He became the first captain to lead two teams in the IPL finals. He also scored 351 runs and strengthened the middle-order along with Venkatesh Iyer. He was released by KKR ahead of the 2025 IPL auction and signed up by Punjab Kings, being named as their captain in January 2025. He became the second captain in Punjab Kings' history to lead them to the finals of the tournament, and the only captain in IPL history to lead three different teams to the finals. However, he faced consecutive defeats as captain in the finals of two different T20 leagues - IPL and T20 Mumbai League.

== Captaincy record ==
=== Indian Premier League ===
==== Captaincy for Delhi franchise ====
During the 2018 edition, Gautam Gambhir stepped down from captaincy due to poor performance of the team in the first half of the tournament and Iyer was made the interim captain for the rest of the tournament. The Daredevils won 4 games and lost 4 games simultaneously during Iyer's captaincy, though they finished last at the points table.

The Delhi franchise underwent rebranding and was renamed Delhi Capitals before the 2019 Auction. Iyer was announced as the captain of the team due to his previous leadership experience in the prior year, with Rishabh Pant being his deputy. Shreyas-led Capitals finished third in the points table and qualified for the IPL playoffs after 2012 with 9 wins and 5 losses in the league stage. Their campaign finally got ended in Qualifier 2, where they were defeated by Chennai Super Kings.

In the 2020 edition, Iyer-led Capitals finished 2nd in the points table with 8 wins and 6 losses, behind Mumbai Indians. They were defeated by Mumbai Indians in Qualifier 1 but bounced back strongly against Sunrisers Hyderabad in Qualifier 2. This was Delhi's maiden and only (till 2026) Final appearance in IPL history. In the final, they lost to the eventual champions Mumbai Indians by 5 wickets and ended up being the runner-up of the tournament. This was the Capitals' best performance in their Indian Premier League history. Shreyas Iyer is the first and only captain to lead Delhi Capitals to an IPL Final.

==== Captaincy concerns ====
During the England's tour of India in 2021, Iyer faced a shoulder injury which forced him to opt out from the 2021 IPL. Rishabh Pant replaced him as the captain of Capitals for that season. The 2021 edition was halted due to second-wave of COVID-19 which helped Iyer to be available for the second half of the season, but the management decided to continue with Pant as the team's captain as they wanted a player of Delhi-origin to be the team captain. Before the 2022 season, Iyer was released by the Delhi management and his name was put into the 2022 Mega-auction.

==== Captaincy for Kolkata Knight Riders ====
The Kolkata Knight Riders bought Iyer in the 2022 Auction at the price of ₹12.25 crore (US$1.3 million) and was appointed as the captain of the team. The 2022 season saw the team suffering several ups and downs in the points table and they finished 7th at the end of the league. Iyer missed the 2023 season due to a back injury and he was succeeded by Nitish Rana as the team's captain for that season.

Iyer returned as the captain of the team before the 2024 season, with Nitish Rana appointed as his deputy. Kolkata Knight Riders finished at the top of the table with 9 wins, 3 losses and 2 no-results. Under Shreyas' captaincy, the Knight Riders finished at the top of the table for the first time in IPL history. Shreyas became the 3rd captain to take the Knight Riders to an IPL final (Gambhir took the team into the final in 2012, 2014 and Morgan in 2021) Till 2024, Iyer is the only captain to take three different teams to an IPL final (2020 for Capitals, 2024 for Knight Riders And 2025 for Kings).

In the 2024 Indian Premier League final, Kolkata Knight Riders defeated Sunrisers Hyderabad by 8 wickets and clinched their third IPL Trophy. Iyer became the second captain of the Knight Riders to lead the team to the ultimate victory. Iyer also became the 5th Indian captain in Indian Premier League history to win the IPL title. He was released ahead of 2025 IPL auction.

==== Captaincy for Punjab Kings ====
Punjab Kings bought Iyer in the 2025 Auction at the price of ₹26.75 crore (US$2.9 million). Iyer was immediately appointed as the captain of the team, and reunited with his former coach from Delhi Capitals, Ricky Ponting. The major task was to rebuild and revamp the Punjab Kings team, who saw a total overhaul in the auction. Players such as Yuzvendra Chahal, Marco Jansen, Arshdeep Singh became a critical part of the core of the team.

The 2025 season proved to be a breakthrough season for the Punjab Kings, who qualified for the play-offs for the first time ever since after the 2014 IPL Season. They scored 19 points from 13 matches. They lost the final to the Royal Challengers Bengaluru by a mere 6 runs. Iyer himself scored 604 runs at a strike rate of 175.10. Iyer's leadership and selfless approach, including sacrificing personal milestones for the team, became symbolic of the new team culture.

== International career ==
In March 2017, Iyer was included in India's Test squad as a replacement for Virat Kohli before the fourth Test against Australia. He served as a substitute fielder in the fourth test and successfully ran out Steve O'Keefe for 8.

In October 2017, Iyer was named in India's Twenty20 International (T20I) squad for their series against New Zealand. He made his T20I debut for India against New Zealand on 1 November 2017, but he did not bat.

In November 2017, Iyer was named in India's One Day International (ODI) squad for their series against Sri Lanka. He made his ODI debut for India against Sri Lanka on 10 December 2017. He scored 88 from 70 balls in the 2nd ODI against Sri Lanka at Mohali.

On 18 December 2019, in the second ODI against the West Indies, Iyer scored 31 runs in one over, the most scored by a batsman for India in a single over in ODIs.

On 24 January 2020, in the first T20I against New Zealand, Iyer scored an unbeaten 58 off 29 balls and was declared the Man of the Match. On 5 February, in the first ODI against New Zealand in Hamilton, he scored 103 off 107 balls, making his maiden century in ODIs.

In September 2021, Iyer was named as one of three reserve players in India's squad for the T20 World Cup. In November, he was named in India's Test squad for their home series against New Zealand. He made his Test debut on 25 November for India against New Zealand. and received his Test cap from the former cricketer Sunil Gavaskar. Iyer became the 16th Indian player to score a century on Test debut, and the first Indian player to score a century and a half-century in the two innings of debut Test.

In the 2022 bilateral T20I series against Sri Lanka, Iyer broke Virat Kohli's record of most runs scored by an Indian batsman in a 3-match T20I bilateral series, scoring a total of 204 runs with three consecutive unbeaten half-centuries.

In March 2022, Iyer was named man of the match after scoring two crucial fifties on a tough turning track in the second Test match against Sri Lanka. In recognition of Iyer's good form, he was named as the ICC player of the month for February 2022. On 9 October 2022, during the 2nd of 3 ODI matches against South Africa, he achieved his 2nd ODI century scoring 113 off 111 balls, and remained unbeaten. However, Shreyas Iyer was not picked in the India squad for the T20 World Cup 2022. During the 2nd T20I against New Zealand in Bay Oval Shreyas was out by hit wicket. He was the 4th Indian player to be out in hit wicket. Shreyas Iyer hit 80 runs for just 76 balls in 1st ODI against New Zealand in Eden Park.

In January 2023, after Sri Lanka series Iyer was out from the New Zealand series due to back pain. Shreyas returned in the Border–Gavaskar Trophy. He was able to play in 2nd Test. During the 4th test at Ahmedabad after Australia finished 1st innings by 480, while India started the batting but Shreyas did not come for the batting. He complained about back pain once again and was taken for the scans. Shreyas Iyer was dropped from the series due to back pain. He went to England for back surgery in April. Shreyas Iyer wasn't available for the ICC Test championship Final against Australia in Kennington Oval. He was recovering in NCA for his return. As a result of his hard work, Iyer was named in Asia Cup 2023.

During the 2nd ODI against Australia in Indore, Iyer scored 105 runs in just 90 balls, marking a strong comeback ahead of the World Cup. India won the match with Iyer winning the Man of the Match Award for his performance.

On 11 Jan'26, 1st ODI against New Zealand in Vadodara, Iyer playing his comeback match after recovering from a spleen injury sustained during last year's Australia tour, played a key supporting role with a fluent 49 off 47 balls.

On 6 June 2026, BCCI appointed Iyer as the new T20I captain replacing Suryakumar Yadav. Iyer had a historically lackluster start to his captaincy stint, as he endured the worst ever start for any Indian captain in T20I's, suffering 6 defeats in 7 matches(1 no result), and is the only Indian captain to go winless in their first 6 completed T20I matches. Iyer won his first game as India's T20I captain on 23 July 2026 against Zimbabwe.

In October 2026, Iyer captained India to the gold medal in men's cricket at the 2026 Asian Games. India defeated Pakistan by 19 runs in the final on 3 October, securing its second consecutive gold medal in the men's cricket competition. The International Cricket Council reported that Iyer led the side during the victory.

During the first T20I against the West Indies, Iyer hit an unbeaten 102* off just 43 balls, hitting 10 fours and 6 sixes. This was his maiden T20I hundred..

On 22 October 2026, Iyer captained India in the first Twenty20 International of India's tour of New Zealand at Hagley Oval in Christchurch. India won the match by four wickets, successfully chasing New Zealand's total of 225/4 by scoring 230/6 in 19.4 overs. Iyer scored 42 runs off 28 balls, while Sanju Samson was named Player of the Match.

- Shreyas Iyer captained India in its 300th T20I.

== International centuries ==
Iyer has scored 7 international centuries – 1 in Tests, 5 in One Day Internationals and 1 in Twenty20 Internationals.

Test centuries
No.	Runs	Against	Pos.	Inn.	Test	Venue	H/A	Date	Result	Ref.
1	105	New Zealand	5	1	1/2	Green Park Stadium, Kanpur	Home	25 November 2021	Drawn	

ODI centuries
No.	Runs	Against	Pos.	Inn.	S/R	Venue	H/A/N	Date	Result	Ref.
1	103	New Zealand	4	1	93.63	Seddon Park, Hamilton	Away	5 February 2020	Lost	
2	113*	South Africa	4	1	100.88	JSCA International Stadium Complex, Ranchi	Home	9 October 2022	Won	
3	105	Australia	4	1	105.00	Holkar Stadium, Indore	Home	24 September 2023	Won	
4	128*	Netherlands	4	1	111.30	M. Chinnaswamy Stadium, Bengaluru	Home	12 November 2023	Won	
5	105	New Zealand	4	1	150.00	Wankhede Stadium, Mumbai	Home	15 November 2023	Won	

T20I centuries
1	102*	West Indies	4	2	237.20	Ekana Cricket Stadium, Lucknow	Home	6 October 2026	Won
