= 2020 Premier Badminton League =

Tournament information
- Sport: Badminton
- Location: India
- Dates: 20 January 2020–9 February 2020
- Administrator: Premier Badminton League
- Teams: 7

Final positions
- Champions: Bengaluru Raptors
- Runner-up: Northeastern Warriors

Tournament statistics
- Top players: (Chinese Taipei) Tai Tzu-ying (India) N. Sikki Reddy
- Emerging player: (India) Priyanshu Rajawat

2020 Premier Badminton League was the fifth edition of Premier Badminton League. It was played from 20 January to 9 February 2020. The season featured seven teams. The Chennai Smashers were renamed as Chennai Superstarz. Bengaluru Raptors beat Northeastern Warriors with a score of 4–2 in the finals to become champions. It was their second consecutive title in PBL.

== Squads ==
| Teams | | Awadhe Warriors | Bengaluru Raptors | Chennai Superstarz | Hyderabad Hunters | Mumbai Rockets | Northeastern Warriors | Pune 7 Aces |
|---|---|---|---|---|---|---|---|---|
| Coach | | (India) Anup Sridhar | (India) Arvind Bhat | (India) Aravindan Samiappan | (India) Rajendra Kumar Jakkampudi | (India) Amrish Shinde | (Indonesia) Edwin Iriawan | (Denmark) Mathias Boe |
| Squads | Domestic | (India) Ajay Jayaram | (India) Ansal Yadav | (India) B. Sumeeth Reddy | (India) Gadde Ruthvika Shivani | (India) Kuhoo Garg | (India) Ashmita Chaliha | (India) Arjun M.R. |
| Squads | Domestic | (India) Subhankar Dey | (India) Arun George | (India) Dhruv Kapila | (India) N. Sikki Reddy | (India) Parupalli Kashyap | (India) Kaushal Dharmamer | (India) Chirag Shetty |
| Squads | Domestic | (India) Tanvi Lad | (India) B. Sai Praneeth | (India) Gayathri Gopichand | (India) Priyanshu Rajawat | (India) Pranav Chopra | (India) Krishna Prasad Garaga | (India) Mithun Manjunath |
| Squads | Domestic | | (India) Medha Shashidharan | (India) Lakshya Sen | (India) P. V. Sindhu | (India) Ramchandran Shlok | (India) Rutaparna Panda | (India) Rituparna Das |
| Squads | Domestic | | | (India) Sankar Muthusamy Subramanian | (India) Sourabh Verma | (India) Shreyansh Jaiswal | | |
| Squads | Domestic | | | (India) Sanjana Santosh | | (India) Shreyanshi Pardeshi | | |
| Squads | Domestic | | | (India) Sathish Kumar Karunakaran | | | | |
| Squads | Domestic | | | (India) Satwiksairaj Rankireddy | | | | |
| Squads | Overseas | (Denmark) Christinna Pedersen | (Chinese Taipei) Tai Tzu-ying | (England) Jessica Pugh | (England) Ben Lane | (Indonesia) Pia Zebadiah Bernadeth | (Canada) Michelle Li | (England) Chris Adcock |
| Squads | Overseas | (Hong Kong) Wong Wing Ki | (France) Brice Leverdez | (Indonesia) Tommy Sugiarto | (England) Sean Vendy | (South Korea) Kim Gi-jung | (Hong Kong) Lee Cheuk Yiu | (England) Gabby Adcock |
| Squads | Overseas | (Russia) Ivan Sozonov | (Indonesia) Rian Agung Saputro | (Scotland) Kirsty Gilmour | (Malaysia) Liew Daren | (South Korea) Kim Sa-rang | (South Korea) Kim Ha-na | (Hong Kong) Tse Ying Suet |
| Squads | Overseas | (South Korea) Ko Sung-hyun | (Malaysia) Chan Peng Soon | | (Russia) Vladimir Ivanov | (South Korea) Lee Dong-keun | (South Korea) Lee Yong-dae | (Indonesia) Hendra Setiawan |
| Squads | Overseas | (South Korea) Shin Baek-cheol | (South Korea) Eom Hye-won | | | | (Thailand) Bodin Isara | (Japan) Kazumasa Sakai |
| Squads | Overseas | (United States) Beiwen Zhang | | | | | (Thailand) Tanongsak Saensomboonsuk | (Singapore) Loh Kean Yew |
| Squads | Overseas | | | | | | | (Vietnam) Vũ Thị Trang |

== Points table ==
| Rank | Team | MP | RMW | RML | TMW | TML | Pts. |
|---|---|---|---|---|---|---|---|
| 1 | Northeastern Warriors | 30 | 13 | 11 | 5 | 1 | 22 |
| 2 | Bengaluru Raptors (C) | 30 | 13 | 11 | 5 | 1 | 22 |
| 3 | Chennai Superstarz | 30 | 10 | 14 | 6 | 0 | 22 |
| 4 | Pune 7 Aces | 30 | 14 | 10 | 4 | 2 | 20 |
| 5 | Awadhe Warriors | 30 | 11 | 13 | 3 | 3 | 14 |
| 6 | Hyderabad Hunters | 30 | 11 | 13 | 2 | 4 | 11 |
| 7 | Mumbai Rockets | 30 | 4 | 20 | 4 | 2 | 10 |

- Qualified for knockouts
- Five matches (MP) constitute one tie
- Each team will play six ties
- 1 point for each Regular Match Won (RMW)
- 0 points for Regular Matches Lost (RML)
- 2 points for each Trump Match Won (TMW)
- -1 point for each Trump Match Lost (TML)

Source: Official PBL website

== Fixtures ==
All times are as Indian Standard Time (UTC+05:30).

=== League stage ===
| # | Date | Time | City | Home | Results | Away | Venue |
|---|---|---|---|---|---|---|---|
| 1 | 20 January | 19:00 | Chennai | Chennai Superstarz | 5–2 | Hyderabad Hunters | Jawaharlal Nehru Indoor Stadium |
| 2 | 21 January | 19:00 | Chennai | Northeastern Warriors | 4–3 | Bengaluru Raptors | Jawaharlal Nehru Indoor Stadium |
| 3 | 22 January | 19:00 | Chennai | Chennai Superstarz | 4–3 | Mumbai Rockets | Jawaharlal Nehru Indoor Stadium |
| 4 | 23 January | 19:00 | Chennai | Northeastern Warriors | 3–4 | Awadhe Warriors | Jawaharlal Nehru Indoor Stadium |
| 5 | 24 January | 19:00 | Chennai | Chennai Superstarz | 4–3 | Bengaluru Raptors | Jawaharlal Nehru Indoor Stadium |
| 6 | 25 January | 19:00 | Lucknow | Pune 7 Aces | 5–2 | Mumbai Rockets | Babu Banarasi Das Indoor Stadium |
| 7 | 26 January | 19:00 | Lucknow | Awadhe Warriors | 1–2 | Hyderabad Hunters | Babu Banarasi Das Indoor Stadium |
| 8 | 27 January | 19:00 | Lucknow | Pune 7 Aces | 4–3 | Bengaluru Raptors | Babu Banarasi Das Indoor Stadium |
| 9 | 28 January | 19:00 | Lucknow | Awadhe Warriors | 5–0 | Mumbai Rockets | Babu Banarasi Das Indoor Stadium |
| 10 | 29 January | 19:00 | Hyderabad | Hyderabad Hunters | 2–1 | Northeastern Warriors | G. M. C. Balayogi SATS Indoor Stadium |
| 11 | 30 January | 15:30 | Hyderabad | Pune 7 Aces | 5–2 | Chennai Superstarz | G. M. C. Balayogi SATS Indoor Stadium |
| 12 | 30 January | 19:00 | Hyderabad | Mumbai Rockets | 2–5 | Northeastern Warriors | G. M. C. Balayogi SATS Indoor Stadium |
| 13 | 31 January | 19:00 | Hyderabad | Hyderabad Hunters | 0–3 | Bengaluru Raptors | G. M. C. Balayogi SATS Indoor Stadium |
| 14 | 1 February | 15:30 | Hyderabad | Pune 7 Aces | 0–5 | Northeastern Warriors | G. M. C. Balayogi SATS Indoor Stadium |
| 15 | 1 February | 19:00 | Hyderabad | Awadhe Warriors | 3–4 | Chennai Superstarz | G. M. C. Balayogi SATS Indoor Stadium |
| 16 | 2 February | 19:00 | Hyderabad | Hyderabad Hunters | 4–3 | Mumbai Rockets | G. M. C. Balayogi SATS Indoor Stadium |
| 17 | 3 February | 19:00 | Hyderabad | Awadhe Warriors | 1–4 | Pune 7 Aces | G. M. C. Balayogi SATS Indoor Stadium |
| 18 | 4 February | 15:30 | Hyderabad | Northeastern Warriors | 4–3 | Chennai Superstarz | G. M. C. Balayogi SATS Indoor Stadium |
| 19 | 4 February | 19:00 | Hyderabad | Bengaluru Raptors | 5–0 | Mumbai Rockets | G. M. C. Balayogi SATS Indoor Stadium |
| 20 | 5 February | 19:00 | Hyderabad | Hyderabad Hunters | 1–2 | Pune 7 Aces | G. M. C. Balayogi SATS Indoor Stadium |
| 21 | 6 February | 19:00 | Hyderabad | Bengaluru Raptors | 5–0 | Awadhe Warriors | G. M. C. Balayogi SATS Indoor Stadium |

=== Knockout stage ===
| # | Date | Time | City | Team 1 | Results | Team 2 | Venue |
|---|---|---|---|---|---|---|---|
| SF1 | 7 February | 19:00 | Hyderabad | Chennai Superstarz | (-1)–3 | Northeastern Warriors | G. M. C. Balayogi SATS Indoor Stadium |
| SF2 | 8 February | 19:00 | Hyderabad | Pune 7 Aces | 3–4 | Bengaluru Raptors | G. M. C. Balayogi SATS Indoor Stadium |
| F | 9 February | 19:00 | Hyderabad | Northeastern Warriors | 2–4 | Bengaluru Raptors | G. M. C. Balayogi SATS Indoor Stadium |

==== Semifinal 1: Chennai Superstarz vs. Northeastern Warriors ====
7, 19 February:00 G. M. C. Balayogi SATS Indoor Stadium, Hyderabad
| # | Event | Team 1 | | Result | | | Team 2 | |
| # | Event | Chennai Superstarz | | (-1)–3 | | | Northeastern Warriors | |
|---|---|---|---|---|---|---|---|---|
| 1 | XD | | B. Sumeeth Reddy (India); Jessica Pugh (England) | 0 | 12–15; 15–9; 14–15 | 1 | (South Korea) Lee Yong-dae (South Korea) Kim Ha-na | |
| 2 | MS | | Tommy Sugiarto (Indonesia) | 0 | 12–15; 12–15 | 1 | (Hong Kong) Lee Cheuk Yiu | |
| 3 | MD | TM | B. Sumeeth Reddy (India); Dhruv Kapila (India) | -1 | 13–15; 15–14; 10–15 | 1 | (India) Krishna Prasad Garaga (Thailand) Bodin Isara | |
| 4 | WS | | Kirsty Gilmour (Scotland) | | – | | (Canada) Michelle Li | TM |
| 5 | MS | | Lakshya Sen (India) | | – | | (Thailand) Tanongsak Saensomboonsuk | |

==== Semifinal 2: Pune 7 Aces vs. Bengaluru Raptors ====
8, 19 February:00 G. M. C. Balayogi SATS Indoor Stadium, Hyderabad
| # | Event | Team 1 | | Result | | | Team 2 | |
| # | Event | Pune 7 Aces | | 3–4 | | | Bengaluru Raptors | |
|---|---|---|---|---|---|---|---|---|
| 1 | MD | TM | Chirag Shetty (India); Hendra Setiawan (Indonesia) | 2 | 15–12; 15–10 | 0 | (India) Arun George (Indonesia) Rian Agung Saputro | |
| 2 | MS | | Mithun Manjunath (India) | 0 | 14–15; 15–9; 6–15 | 1 | (France) Brice Leverdez | |
| 3 | MS | | Kazumasa Sakai (Japan) | 1 | 15–11; 15–13 | 0 | (India) B. Sai Praneeth | |
| 4 | WS | | Rituparna Das (India) | 0 | 12–15; 12–15 | 2 | (Chinese Taipei) Tai Tzu-ying | TM |
| 5 | XD | | Chris Adcock (England); Gabby Adcock (England) | 0 | 13–15; 10–15 | 1 | (Malaysia) Chan Peng Soon (South Korea) Eom Hye-won | |

==== Final: Northeastern Warriors vs. Bengaluru Raptors ====
9, 19 February:00 G. M. C. Balayogi SATS Indoor Stadium, Hyderabad
| # | Event | Team 1 | | Result | | | Team 2 | |
| # | Event | Northeastern Warriors | | 2–4 | | | Bengaluru Raptors | |
|---|---|---|---|---|---|---|---|---|
| 1 | MS | | Lee Cheuk Yiu (Hong Kong) | 0 | 15–14; 9–15; 3–15 | 1 | (India) B. Sai Praneeth | |
| 2 | MD | TM | Bodin Isara (Thailand); Lee Yong-dae (South Korea) | 2 | 15–11; 13–15; 15–14 | 0 | (India) Arun George (Indonesia) Rian Agung Saputro | |
| 3 | WS | | Michelle Li (Canada) | 0 | 9–15; 12–15 | 1 | (Chinese Taipei) Tai Tzu-ying | |
| 4 | XD | | Krishna Prasad Garaga (India); Kim Ha-na (South Korea) | 0 | 14–15; 15–14; 12–15 | 2 | (Malaysia) Chan Peng Soon (South Korea) Eom Hye-won | TM |
| 5 | MS | | Tanongsak Saensomboonsuk (Thailand) | | – | | (France) Brice Leverdez | |

== End-of-season awards ==
| Player | Team | Award | Value |
|---|---|---|---|
| (Chinese Taipei) Tai Tzu-ying | Bengaluru Raptors | Player of the League | ₹1 lakh (US$1,000) |
| (India) N. Sikki Reddy | Hyderabad Hunters | Indian Player of the League | ₹50,000 (US$520) |
| (India) Priyanshu Rajawat | Hyderabad Hunters | Emerging Player of the League | ₹50,000 (US$520) |
