= Rituparna Das =

Indian badminton player (born 1996)

Personal information
- Born: 2 October 1996 (age 30) Haldia, India

Sport
- Country: India
- Sport: Badminton
- Handedness: Right

Women's singles
- Highest ranking: 44 (21 September 2017)
- Current ranking: 71 (31 January 2023)
- BWF profile

Rituparna Das (born 2 October 1996) is an Indian badminton player.

== Achievements ==
=== BWF International Challenge/Series (3 titles, 3 runners-up) ===
Women's singles
Year	Tournament	Opponent	Score	Result
2016	Polish International	(India) Rasika Raje	11–21, 21–7, 21–17	(gold) Winner
2016	India International Series	(India) Gadde Ruthvika Shivani	11–7, 8–11, 11–7, 14–12	(gold) Winner
2018	Belgian International	(Chinese Taipei) Lin Ying-chun	16–21, 16–21	(silver) Runner-up
2018	Polish International	(India) Vrushali Gummadi	21–11, 21–14	(gold) Winner
2019	Dubai International	(Japan) Mako Urushizaki	21–23, 17–21	(silver) Runner-up
2019	Italian International	(Spain) Carolina Marín	19–21, 14–21	(silver) Runner-up

BWF International Challenge tournament
BWF International Series tournament
BWF Future Series tournament
