= Northeastern Warriors =

Badminton club

North Eastern Warriors
- Sport: Badminton
- Founded: 2017
- First season: 2017–18
- League: Premier Badminton League
- Based in: Guwahati, Assam
- Home ground: Karmabir Nabin Chandra Bordoloi Indoor Stadium
- Colors: Green
- Owner: The Eastern Warriors Pvt. Ltd.
- Head coach: Edwin Iriawan
- Captain: Saina Nehwal
- PBL wins: none

North Eastern Warriors is a badminton team representing Guwahati, Assam owned by The Eastern Warriors Pvt. Ltd. for the Premier Badminton League (PBL). The team's home ground is Karmabir Nabin Chandra Bordoloi Indoor Stadium, Guwahati. The team is coached by Indonesian coach Edwin Iriawan.

== Current squad ==
=== Coach ===
- (Indonesia) Edwin Iriawan

=== Indian players ===
(India) Ashmita Chaliha
(India) Kaushal Dharmamer
(India) Krishna Prasad Garaga
(India) Rutaparna Panda

=== Foreign players ===
(Canada) Michelle Li
(Hong Kong) Lee Cheuk Yiu
(South Korea) Kim Ha-na
(South Korea) Lee Yong-dae
(Thailand) Bodin Isara
(Thailand) Tanongsak Saensomboonsuk
