= 2013 BWF World Championships – Men's singles =

Badminton tournament results

Men's singles at the 2013 BWF World Championships
- Venue: Tianhe Sports Center
- Location: Guangzhou, China
- Dates: August 5, 2013 – August 11, 2013

Medalists
gold medal	Lin Dan	China
silver medal	Lee Chong Wei	Malaysia
bronze medal	Du Pengyu	China
bronze medal	Nguyễn Tiến Minh	Vietnam

The men's singles tournament of the 2013 BWF World Championships (World Badminton Championships) was held from August 5 to 11. Lin Dan was the defending champion.

Lin Dan defeated Lee Chong Wei 16–21, 21–13, 20–17^{r} in the final.

== Seeds ==
1. (Malaysia) Lee Chong Wei (final)
2. (China) Chen Long (quarterfinals)
3. (China) Du Pengyu (semifinals)
4. (Thailand) Boonsak Ponsana (third round)
5. (Japan) Kenichi Tago (first round, withdrew)
6. (Hong Kong) Hu Yun (third round)
7. (Vietnam) Nguyễn Tiến Minh (semifinals)
8. (Indonesia) Tommy Sugiarto (quarterfinals)
9. (Denmark) Jan Ø. Jørgensen (quarterfinals)
10. (Indonesia) Sony Dwi Kuncoro (first round)
11. (Germany) Marc Zwiebler (third round)
12. (Hong Kong) Wong Wing Ki (first round)
13. (India) Kashyap Parupalli (quarterfinals)
14. (China) Wang Zhengming (third round)
15. (Malaysia) Chong Wei Feng (third round)
16. (Japan) Takuma Ueda (third round)

Click on the seed number of a player to go to their draw section.

== Draw ==
=== Finals ===
Quarterfinals
1	(Malaysia) Lee Chong Wei	21	21
8	(Indonesia) Tommy Sugiarto	6	9
13	(India) Kashyap Parupalli	21	20	15
3	(China) Du Pengyu	16	22	21
9	(Denmark) Jan Ø. Jørgensen	8	21	20
7	(Vietnam) Nguyễn Tiến Minh	21	17	22
(China) Lin Dan	21	22
2	(China) Chen Long	13	20

Semifinals
1	(Malaysia) Lee Chong Wei	20	21	21
3	(China) Du Pengyu	22	12	15
7	(Vietnam) Nguyễn Tiến Minh	17	15
(China) Lin Dan	21	21

Final
1	(Malaysia) Lee Chong Wei	21	13	17^{r}
(China) Lin Dan	16	21	20

=== Section 1 ===
First Round
1	(Malaysia) Lee Chong Wei	21	21
(Republic of Ireland) Scott Evans	11	15
(Israel) Misha Zilberman	15	21
(Indonesia) Dionysius Hayom Rumbaka	21	23
(Russia) Vladimir Ivanov	21	21
(Austria) Michael Lahnsteiner	12	10
(Belgium) Yuhan Tan	17	14
14	(China) Wang Zhengming	21	21
11	(Germany) Marc Zwiebler	21	18	21
(Ukraine) Valeriy Atrashchenkov	15	21	14
(United States) Howard Shu	16	16
(England) Toby Penty	21	21
(Chinese Taipei) Hsu Jen-hao	11	21	22
(Indonesia) Simon Santoso	21	14	20
(Denmark) Hans-Kristian Vittinghus	18	21	17
8	(Indonesia) Tommy Sugiarto	21	15	21

Second Round
1	(Malaysia) Lee Chong Wei	14	21	21
(Indonesia) Dionysius Hayom Rumbaka	21	18	11
(Russia) Vladimir Ivanov	21	9	18
14	(China) Wang Zhengming	16	21	21
11	(Germany) Marc Zwiebler	21	21
(England) Toby Penty	14	11
(Chinese Taipei) Hsu Jen-hao	9	7
8	(Indonesia) Tommy Sugiarto	21	21

Third Round
1	(Malaysia) Lee Chong Wei	21	21
14	(China) Wang Zhengming	12	7
11	(Germany) Marc Zwiebler	19	14
8	(Indonesia) Tommy Sugiarto	21	21

Quarterfinals
1	(Malaysia) Lee Chong Wei	21	21
8	(Indonesia) Tommy Sugiarto	6	9

=== Section 2 ===
First Round
6	(Hong Kong) Hu Yun	21	21
(Sri Lanka) Niluka Karunaratne	13	16
(Uganda) Edwin Ekiring	21	21
(Slovakia) Jarolim Vicen	17	13
(Czech Republic) Petr Koukal	21	10	21
(Netherlands) Erik Meijs	18	21	14
(Estonia) Raul Must	21	14	9
13	(India) Kashyap Parupalli	19	21	21
16	(Japan) Takuma Ueda	16	21	21
(Singapore) Ashton Chen Yong Zhao	21	11	13
(Finland) Ville Lång	4	15
(Denmark) Viktor Axelsen	21	21
(Thailand) Tanongsak Saensomboonsuk
(France) Brice Leverdez	w/o
(South Korea) Shon Wan-ho	17	21	13
3	(China) Du Pengyu	21	16	21

Second Round
6	(Hong Kong) Hu Yun	21	21
(Uganda) Edwin Ekiring	11	18
(Czech Republic) Petr Koukal	5^{r}
13	(India) Kashyap Parupalli	14
16	(Japan) Takuma Ueda	24	21
(Denmark) Viktor Axelsen	22	17
(Thailand) Tanongsak Saensomboonsuk	5	21	15
3	(China) Du Pengyu	21	16	21

Third Round
6	(Hong Kong) Hu Yun	13	16
13	(India) Kashyap Parupalli	21	21
16	(Japan) Takuma Ueda	19	21	7
3	(China) Du Pengyu	21	13	21

Quarterfinals
13	(India) Kashyap Parupalli	21	20	15
3	(China) Du Pengyu	16	22	21

=== Section 3 ===
First Round
4	(Thailand) Boonsak Ponsana	21	21
(France) Matthieu Lo Ying Ping	13	12
(Norway) Marius Myhre	16	15
(Sweden) Henri Hurskainen	21	21
(Chinese Taipei) Chou Tien-chen	21	21
(Slovenia) Iztok Utrosa	13	12
(South Korea) Lee Dong-keun	16	21	15
9	(Denmark) Jan Ø. Jørgensen	21	17	21
12	(Hong Kong) Wong Wing Ki	20	21	15
(India) Ajay Jayaram	22	17	21
(Cuba) Osleni Guerrero	14	21
(Spain) Pablo Abian	21	23
(Germany) Dieter Domke	21	21
(Czech Republic) Jan Frohlich	10	13
(New Zealand) Joe Wu	8	11
7	(Vietnam) Nguyễn Tiến Minh	21	21

Second Round
4	(Thailand) Boonsak Ponsana	21	15	21
(Sweden) Henri Hurskainen	7	21	15
(Chinese Taipei) Chou Tien-chen	10	21	10
9	(Denmark) Jan Ø. Jørgensen	21	19	21
(India) Ajay Jayaram	9	17
(Spain) Pablo Abian	21	21
(Germany) Dieter Domke	22	17
7	(Vietnam) Nguyễn Tiến Minh	24	21

Third Round
4	(Thailand) Boonsak Ponsana	21	17	18
9	(Denmark) Jan Ø. Jørgensen	10	21	21
(Spain) Pablo Abian	21	9	10
7	(Vietnam) Nguyễn Tiến Minh	15	21	21

Quarterfinals
9	(Denmark) Jan Ø. Jørgensen	8	21	20
7	(Vietnam) Nguyễn Tiến Minh	21	17	22

=== Section 4 ===
First Round
5	(Japan) Kenichi Tago	w/o
(Netherlands) Eric Pang
(China) Lin Dan	21	21
(United States) Sattawat Pongnairat	6	9
(Ukraine) Dmytro Zavadsky	21	21
(Finland) Eetu Heino	15	13
(England) Rajiv Ouseph	11	15
15	(Malaysia) Chong Wei Feng	21	21
10	(Indonesia) Sony Dwi Kuncoro	22	16
(Singapore) Derek Wong Zi Liang	24	21
(Russia) Vladimir Malkov	18	22	9
(Malaysia) Daren Liew	21	20	21
(Japan) Sho Sasaki	21	21
(Scotland) Alistair Casey	6	18
(Austria) Luka Wraber	3	5
2	(China) Chen Long	21	21

Second Round
(Netherlands) Eric Pang	14	17
(China) Lin Dan	21	21
(Ukraine) Dmytro Zavadsky	6	13
15	(Malaysia) Chong Wei Feng	21	21
(Singapore) Derek Wong Zi Liang	13	13
(Malaysia) Daren Liew	21	21
(Japan) Sho Sasaki	15	12
2	(China) Chen Long	21	21

Third Round
(China) Lin Dan	22	21
15	(Malaysia) Chong Wei Feng	20	10
(Malaysia) Daren Liew	18	15
2	(China) Chen Long	21	21

Quarterfinals
(China) Lin Dan	21	22
2	(China) Chen Long	13	20
