= 2009 BWF World Championships – Men's singles =

Badminton championships

Men's singles at the 2009 BWF World Championships
- Venue: Gachibowli Indoor Stadium
- Location: Hyderabad, India
- Dates: August 10, 2009 – August 16, 2009

Medalists
gold medal	Lin Dan	China
silver medal	Chen Jin	China
bronze medal	Taufik Hidayat	Indonesia
bronze medal	Sony Dwi Kuncoro	Indonesia

The 2009 BWF World Championships was the 17th tournament of the World Badminton Championships. It was held at the Gachibowli Indoor Stadium in Hyderabad, Telangana, India, from 10 to 16 August, 2009. Following the results of the men's singles.

== Seeds ==
1. (Malaysia) Lee Chong Wei (quarter-final)
2. (China) Chen Jin (final)
3. (Denmark) Peter Gade (quarter-final)
4. (Indonesia) Taufik Hidayat (semi-final)
5. (China) Lin Dan (champion)
6. (Indonesia) Sony Dwi Kuncoro (semi-final)
7. (Denmark) Joachim Persson (first round)
8. (South Korea) Park Sung-hwan (second round)
9. (Chinese Taipei) Hsieh Yu-hsing (third round)
10. (Hong Kong) Chan Yan Kit (third round)
11. (China) Bao Chunlai (first round)
12. (Malaysia) Wong Choong Hann (third round)
13. (Indonesia) Simon Santoso (quarter-final)
14. (Vietnam) Nguyen Tien Minh (third round)
15. (India) Chetan Anand (third round)
16. (Thailand) Boonsak Ponsana (third round)

== Main stage ==
=== Section 1 ===
First round
1	(Malaysia) Lee CW	21	21
(Germany) D Domke	14	10
(Nigeria) O Fagbemi
(England) R Ouseph	wo
14	(Vietnam) Nguyen TM
(Czech Republic) P Koukal	wo
(France) B Leverdez	21	21
(Hungary) H Toth	12	19
6	(Indonesia) SD Kuncoro	21	21
(Austria) M Lahnsteiner	13	9
(Poland) P Wacha	21	21
(Chinese Taipei) Hsueh H-y	10	13
15	(India) C Anand	21	21
(South Korea) Hong J-h	8	16
(Bulgaria) S Makarski	18	21	21
(Scotland) A Casey	21	18	13

Second round
1	(Malaysia) Lee CW	21	21
(Nigeria) O Fagbemi	11	14
14	(Vietnam) Nguyen TM	21	21
(France) B Leverdez	14	16
6	(Indonesia) SD Kuncoro	21	21
(Poland) P Wacha	12	13
15	(India) C Anand	21	21
(Bulgaria) S Makarski	9	17

Third round
1	(Malaysia) Lee CW	21	21
14	(Vietnam) Nguyen TM	13	17
6	(Indonesia) SD Kuncoro	21	21
15	(India) C Anand	16	16

Quarterfinals
1	(Malaysia) Lee CW	16	21	12
6	(Indonesia) SD Kuncoro	21	14	21

=== Section 2 ===
First round
3	(Denmark) P Gade	21	21
(Ukraine) V Atrashchenkov	11	16
(Canada) S Wojcikiewicz	wo
(Japan) S Sasaki
10	(Hong Kong) Chan YK	21	21
(Iran) K Mehrabi	15	11
(Republic of Ireland) S Evans	21	22
(Russia) V Malkov	9	20
5	(China) Lin D	21	21
(Israel) M Zilberman	9	11
(Malaysia) Lee TS	7	13
(Thailand) T Saensomboonsuk	21	21
11	(China) Bao CL	18	14
(Netherlands) D Palyama	21	21
(Slovakia) M Matejka	10	16
(Sweden) H Hurskainen	21	21

Second round
3	(Denmark) P Gade	21	21
(Japan) S Sasaki	11	12
10	(Hong Kong) Chan YK	21	19	21
(Republic of Ireland) S Evans	16	21	12
5	(China) Lin D	21	21
(Thailand) T Saensomboonsuk	16	12
(Netherlands) D Palyama	21	21
(Sweden) H Hurskainen	15	14

Third round
3	(Denmark) P Gade	21	21
10	(Hong Kong) Chan YK	11	12
5	(China) Lin D	21	21
(Netherlands) D Palyama	11	11

Quarterfinals
3	(Denmark) P Gade	20	16
5	(China) Lin D	22	21

=== Section 3 ===
First round
(New Zealand) J Wu
(Canada) B Milroy	wo
(Lithuania) K Navickas	14	21	17
16	(Thailand) B Ponsana	21	14	21
(Denmark) JØ Jørgensen
(England) A Smith	wo
(Norway) S Klausen	21	13	18
8	(South Korea) Park S-h	19	21	21
(Hong Kong) Ng W	21	21
(Czech Republic) J Vondra	19	18
(India) A Bhat	14	21	22
9	(Chinese Taipei) Hsieh Y-h	21	19	24
(Ukraine) D Zavadsky	19	18
(France) M Lo Ying Ping	21	21
(Switzerland) C Bösiger	14	14
4	(Indonesia) T Hidayat	21	21

Second round
(New Zealand) J Wu	16	6
16	(Thailand) B Ponsana	21	21
(Denmark) JØ Jørgensen	21	17	21
8	(South Korea) Park S-h	16	21	15
(Hong Kong) Ng W	22	22	18
9	(Chinese Taipei) Hsieh Y-h	24	20	21
(France) M Lo Ying Ping	17	15
4	(Indonesia) T Hidayat	21	21

Third round
16	(Thailand) B Ponsana	21	14	14
(Denmark) JØ Jørgensen	18	21	21
9	(Chinese Taipei) Hsieh Y-h	15	19
4	(Indonesia) T Hidayat	21	21

Quarterfinals
(Denmark) JØ Jørgensen	19	19
4	(Indonesia) T Hidayat	21	21

=== Section 4 ===
First round
(Singapore) D Wong	23	21	21
(Sweden) G Ulldahl	25	13	7
(Belgium) Y Tan	20	11
13	(Indonesia) S Santoso	22	21
(Germany) M Zwiebler	21	21
(Guatemala) K Cordón	15	11
(Japan) K Tago	16	21	21
7	(Denmark) J Persson	21	14	13
(Estonia) R Must	21	18	21
(Russia) I Sozonov	16	21	12
(Finland) V Lång	7	10
12	(Malaysia) Wong CH	21	21
(India) K Parupalli	21	21
(Iran) A Shahhosseini	9	13
(Netherlands) E Pang	14	19
2	(China) Chen J	21	21

Second round
(Singapore) D Wong	13	21	16
13	(Indonesia) S Santoso	21	19	21
(Germany) M Zwiebler	15	10
(Japan) K Tago	21	21
(Estonia) R Must	12	21	16
12	(Malaysia) Wong CH	21	7	21
(India) K Parupalli	21	10	7
2	(China) Chen J	14	21	21

Third round
13	(Indonesia) S Santoso	21	21
(Japan) K Tago	10	12
12	(Malaysia) Wong CH	12	7
2	(China) Chen J	21	21

Quarterfinals
13	(Indonesia) S Santoso	10	13
2	(China) Chen J	21	21

== Final stage ==
Quarterfinals
1	(Malaysia) Lee Chong Wei	16	21	12
6	(Indonesia) Sony Dwi Kuncoro	21	14	21
3	(Denmark) Peter Gade	20	16
5	(China) Lin Dan	22	21
(Denmark) Jan Ø. Jørgensen	19	19
4	(Indonesia) Taufik Hidayat	21	21
13	(Indonesia) Simon Santoso	10	13
2	(China) Chen Jin	21	21

Semifinals
6	(Indonesia) Sony Dwi Kuncoro	14	21	15
5	(China) Lin Dan	21	13	21
4	(Indonesia) Taufik Hidayat	16	6
2	(China) Chen Jin	21	21

Finals
5	(China) Lin Dan	21	21
2	(China) Chen Jin	18	16
