= 2012 German Open Grand Prix Gold =

Tournament details
- Dates: 28 February 2012 – 4 March 2012
- Total prize money: US$125,000
- Venue: RWE-Sporthalle
- Location: Mulheim an der Ruhr, Germany

Champions
- Men's singles: (China) Lin Dan
- Women's singles: (China) Li Xuerui
- Men's doubles: (China) Hong Wei (China) Shen Ye
- Women's doubles: (China) Xia Huan (China) Tang Jinhua
- Mixed doubles: (Denmark) Thomas Laybourn (Denmark) Kamilla Rytter Juhl

The 2012 German Open Grand Prix Gold was the first grand prix gold and grand prix tournament of the 2012 BWF Grand Prix Gold and Grand Prix. The tournament was held in RWE-Sporthalle, Mulheim an der Ruhr, Germany from February 28 until March 4, 2012 and had a total purse of $125,000.

== Men's singles ==
=== Seeds ===
1. (China) Lin Dan (champion)
2. (China) Chen Jin (third round)
3. (Japan) Sho Sasaki (third round)
4. (South Korea) Lee Hyun-Il (third round)
5. (Indonesia) Simon Santoso (final)
6. (Denmark) Jan Ø. Jørgensen (semi-final)
7. (Germany) Marc Zwiebler (third round)
8. (China) Wang Zhengming (first round)
9. (Indonesia) Tommy Sugiarto (semi-final)
10. (Denmark) Hans-Kristian Vittinghus (quarter-final)
11. (South Korea) Shon Wan-Ho (quarter-final)
12. (Thailand) Boonsak Ponsana (second round)
13. (Hong Kong) Wong Wing Ki (quarter-final)
14. (Spain) Pablo Abian (third round)
15. (England) Rajiv Ouseph (withdrew)
16. (Indonesia) Dionysius Hayom Rumbaka (third round)

=== Finals ===
Quarterfinals
1	(China) Lin Dan	21	23
10	(Denmark) Hans-Kristian Vittinghus	19	21
9	(Indonesia) Tommy Sugiarto	21	21
(Finland) Ville Lang	14	14
5	(Indonesia) Simon Santoso	19	21	23
11	(South Korea) Shon Wan-Ho	21	19	21
6	(Denmark) Jan Ø. Jørgensen	21	21
13	(Hong Kong) Wong Wing Ki	17	11

Semifinals
1	(China) Lin Dan	21	21
9	(Indonesia) Tommy Sugiarto	10	11
5	(Indonesia) Simon Santoso	21	21
6	(Denmark) Jan Ø. Jørgensen	12	13

Final
1	(China) Lin Dan	21	21
5	(Indonesia) Simon Santoso	11	11

=== Top half ===
==== Section 1 ====
First Round
1	(China) Lin D	21	21
Q6	(Sweden) M Borg	15	11
(England) C Baxter	21	21
(Russia) I Sozonov	16	16
14	(Spain) P Abian	21	21
(Guatemala) K Cordon	14	17
(Chinese Taipei) Hsueh H-Y	19	21	21
PFQ	(Denmark) R Fladberg	21	8	15

Second Round
1	(China) Lin D	21	21
(England) C Baxter	14	9
14	(Spain) P Abian	21	21
(Chinese Taipei) Hsueh H-Y	14	17

Third Round
1	(China) Lin D	21	21
14	(Spain) P Abian	15	13

==== Section 2 ====
First Round
7	(Germany) M Zwiebler	21	21
Q3	(Germany) L Schmidt	13	16
(Denmark) V Axelsen	21	21
(Sweden) H Hurskainen	15	7
10	(Denmark) H Vittinghus
(Netherlands) E Pang	wo
(India) K Parupalli	15	21
(Singapore) D Wong	21	23

Second Round
7	(Germany) M Zwiebler	19	21	21
(Denmark) V Axelsen	21	11	17
10	(Denmark) H Vittinghus	21	19	21
(Singapore) D Wong	16	21	11

Third Round
7	(Germany) M Zwiebler	9	18
10	(Denmark) H Vittinghus	21	21

==== Section 3 ====
First Round
4	(South Korea) Lee H-I	21	21
(Hong Kong) Chan YK	13	19
(Republic of Ireland) S Evans	9	0^{r}
(India) A Bhat	21	0
9	(Indonesia) T Sugiarto	21	21
Q7	(Slovenia) I Utrosa	10	9
(Japan) K Yamada	21	21
Q4	(Bulgaria) S Makarski	13	12

Second Round
4	(South Korea) Lee H-I	21	19	21
(India) A Bhat	19	21	15
9	(Indonesia) T Sugiarto	22	25
(Japan) K Yamada	20	23

Third Round
4	(South Korea) Lee H-Y	21	14	15
9	(Indonesia) T Sugiarto	18	21	21

==== Section 4 ====
First Round
8	(China) Wang ZM	12	18
(Denmark) C Thomsen	21	21
(Malaysia) Chan KB	21	21
(Ukraine) D Zavadsky	14	9
12	(Thailand) B Ponsana	21	9	21
Q5	(Italy) W Putro	11	21	13
(Finland) V Lang	21	21
PFQ	(Iran) K Mehrabi	11	13

Second Round
(Denmark) C Thomsen	21	21
(Malaysia) Chan KB	15	15
12	(Thailand) B Ponsana	20	14
(Finland) V Lang	22	21

Third Round
(Denmark) C Thomsen	21	19	16
(Finland) V Lang	19	21	21

=== Bottom half ===
==== Section 5 ====
First Round
(Singapore) A Chen	21	21
(Thailand) S Avihingsanon	18	13
(Malaysia) Chong WF	21	21
PFQ	(Russia) S Pukhov	12	10
(India) A Pawar	21	21
Q2	(Finland) E Heino	12	16
(India) A Jayaram	9	19
5	(Indonesia) S Santoso	21	21

Second Round
(Singapore) A Chen	21	21
(Malaysia) Chong WF	13	14
(India) A Pawar	12	21	19
5	(Indonesia) S Santoso	21	15	21

Third Round
(Singapore) A Chen	6	17
5	(Indonesia) S Santoso	21	21

==== Section 6 ====
First Round
(Russia) V Ivanov	21	21
(Chinese Taipei) Hsu J-H	18	13
Q1	(Germany) F Hammes	15	14
11	(South Korea) Shon W-H	21	21
(Czech Republic) P Koukal	15	19
(Indonesia) A Tedjono	21	21
Q8	(South Korea) Hong J-H	13	15
3	(Japan) S Sasaki	21	21

Second Round
(Russia) V Ivanov	14	8
11	(South Korea) Shon W-H	21	21
(Indonesia) A Tedjono	14	14
3	(Japan) S Sasaki	21	21

Third Round
11	(South Korea) Shon W-H	21	21
3	(Japan) S Sasaki	15	18

==== Section 7 ====
First Round
(Ukraine) V Atrashchenkov	18	21	20
(Germany) D Domke	21	17	22
(Belgium) Y Tan	18	16
16	(Indonesia) D Rumbaka	21	21
(Russia) V Malkov	21	22
(Poland) P Wacha	16	20
(India) S Varma	21	17	15
6	(Denmark) J Jørgensen	19	21	21

Second Round
(Germany) D Domke	21	12	14
16	(Indonesia) D Rumbaka	19	21	21
(Russia) V Malkov	15	15
6	(Denmark) J Jørgensen	21	21

Third Round
16	(Indonesia) D Rumbaka	14	12
6	(Denmark) J Jørgensen	21	21

==== Section 8 ====
First Round
(Netherlands) D Palyama	15	21	15
(Malaysia) Tan CS	21	11	21
(Indonesia) S Kuncoro	20	16
13	(Hong Kong) Wong WK	22	21
(France) B Leverdez	10	21	21
(Chinese Taipei) Chou T-C	21	14	19
PFQ	(Czech Republic) J Frohlich	9	14
2	(China) Chen J	21	21

Second Round
(Malaysia) Tan CS	12	12^{r}
13	(Hong Kong) Wong WK	21	15
(France) B Leverdez	9	14
2	(China) Chen J	21	21

Third Round
13	(Hong Kong) Wong WK	21	21
2	(China) Chen J	9	17

== Women's singles ==
=== Seeds ===
1. (China) Wang Xin (semi-final)
2. (China) Li Xuerui (champion)
3. (Germany) Juliane Schenk (final)
4. (Chinese Taipei) Cheng Shao-Chieh (first round)
5. (South Korea) Sung Ji-Hyun (quarter-final)
6. (South Korea) Bae Youn-Joo (first round)
7. (Thailand) Ratchanok Inthanon (quarter-final)
8. (Thailand) Porntip Buranaprasertsuk (second round)

=== Finals ===
Semifinals
1	(China) Wang Xin	14	16
3	(Germany) Juliane Schenk	21	21
(Singapore) Gu Juan	22	14
2	(China) Li Xuerui	24	21

Final
3	(Germany) Juliane Schenk	19	16
2	(China) Li Xuerui	21	21

=== Top half ===
==== Section 1 ====
First Round
1	(China) Wang X	22	21
(Chinese Taipei) Pai H-M	20	15
(Scotland) S Egelstaff	10	15
(Canada) M Li	21	21
5	(South Korea) Sung J-H	21	21
(Bulgaria) L Zechiri	11	7
(Japan) A Goto	21	21
(Chinese Taipei) Tai T-Y	16	10

Second Round
1	(China) Wang X	21	21
(Canada) M Li	11	6
5	(South Korea) Sung J-H	21	21
(Japan) A Goto	14	11

Quarterfinals
1	(China) Wang X	19	21	21
5	(South Korea) Sung J-H	21	18	18

==== Section 2 ====
First Round
3	(Germany) J Schenk	21	21
PFQ	(Russia) A Prokopenko	4	15
(Singapore) Fu MT	16	21	21
(Japan) E Hirose	21	12	23
7	(Thailand) R Inthanon	21	21
Q3	(Indonesia) M Kusumastuti	8	14
(Hong Kong) Yip PY	21	21
(Ukraine) L Griga	14	15

Second Round
3	(Germany) J Schenk	22	21
(Japan) E Hirose	20	14
7	(Thailand) R Inthanon	22	21
(Hong Kong) Yip PY	20	19

Quarterfinals
3	(Germany) J Schenk	21	16	21
7	(Thailand) R Inthanon	17	21	10

=== Bottom half ===
==== Section 3 ====
First Round
(Singapore) Gu J	21	21
(India) P Sindhu	14	15
(Netherlands) Yao J	21	21	11
8	(Thailand) P Buranaprasertsuk	18	23	21
(Bulgaria) P Nedelcheva	10	15
Q1	(Indonesia) L Fanetri	21	21
(Spain) C Marín	21	21
4	(Chinese Taipei) Cheng S-C	10	19

Second Round
(Singapore) Gu J	21	21
8	(Thailand) P Buranaprasertsuk	13	11
Q1	(Indonesia) L Fanetri	21	17	21
(Spain) C Marín	16	21	19

Quarterfinals
(Singapore) Gu J	21	21
Q1	(Indonesia) L Fanetri	17	19

==== Section 4 ====
First Round
(Hong Kong) Chan TK	21	21
(Japan) S Sato	13	13
(Thailand) S Taerattanachai	29	21
6	(South Korea) Bae Y-J	27	15
Q4	(France) S Vignes Waran	14	18
Q2	(Thailand) S Ponsana	21	21
(Indonesia) A Firdasari	15	7
2	(China) Li XR	21	21

Second Round
(Hong Kong) Chan TK	21	21
(Thailand) S Taerattanachai	19	9
Q2	(Thailand) S Ponsana	11	10
2	(China) Li XR	21	21

Quarterfinals
(Hong Kong) Chan TK	10	8
2	(China) Li XR	21	21

== Men's doubles ==
=== Seeds ===
1. (South Korea) Jung Jae-Sung / Lee Yong-Dae (final)
2. (South Korea) Ko Sung-Hyun / Yoo Yeon-Seong (semi-final)
3. (China) Chai Biao / Guo Zhendong (first round)
4. (Indonesia) Mohammad Ahsan / Bona Septano (second round)
5. (Japan) Hirokatsu Hashimoto / Noriyasu Hirata (quarter-final)
6. (Indonesia) Alvent Yulianto / Hendra Aprida Gunawan (second round)
7. (Indonesia) Markis Kido / Hendra Setiawan (quarter-final)
8. (Chinese Taipei) Fang Chieh-Min / Lee Sheng-Mu (first round)

=== Finals ===
Semifinals
1	(South Korea) Jung Jae-Sung (South Korea) Lee Yong-Dae	21	21
(Japan) Hiroyuki Endo (Japan) Kenichi Hayakawa	12	13
(China) Hong Wei (China) Shen Ye	19	23	21
2	(South Korea) Ko Sung-Hyun (South Korea) Yoo Yeon-Seong	21	21	12

Final
1	(South Korea) Jung Jae-Sung (South Korea) Lee Yong-Dae	19	21	19
(China) Hong Wei (China) Shen Ye	21	18	21

=== Top half ===
==== Section 1 ====
First Round
1	(South Korea) Jung J-S (South Korea) Lee Y-D	21	21
(Thailand) B Issara (Thailand) M Jongjit	19	12
(Germany) M Fuchs (Germany) O Roth	21	24
(United States) H Bach (United States) T Gunawan	17	22
6	(Indonesia) A Yulianto (Indonesia) H Gunawan	21	19	21
(Denmark) M Conrad-Petersen (Denmark) J Rasmussen	15	21	15
(China) Liu XL (China) Qiu ZH	21	13	12
(South Korea) Kim K-J (South Korea) Kim S-R	19	21	21

Second Round
1	(South Korea) Jung J-S (South Korea) Lee Y-D	21	21
(Germany) M Fuchs (Germany) O Roth	8	12
6	(Indonesia) A Yulianto (Indonesia) H Gunawan	13	10
(South Korea) Kim K-J (South Korea) Kim S-R	21	21

Quarterfinals
1	(South Korea) Jung J-S (South Korea) Lee Y-D
(South Korea) Kim K-J (South Korea) Kim S-R	wo

==== Section 2 ====
First Round
3	(China) Chai B (China) Guo ZD	21	19	23
(Russia) V Ivanov (Russia) I Sozonov	17	21	25
PFQ	(Poland) L Moren (Poland) W Szkudlarczyk	22	18
(Japan) H Endo (Japan) K Hayakawa	24	21
8	(Chinese Taipei) Fang C-M (Chinese Taipei) Lee S-M	17	18
(Japan) N Kawamae (Japan) S Sato	21	21
Q4	(France) R Labar (France) M Quere	17	11
(Netherlands) R Bosch (Netherlands) K Ridder	21	21

Second Round
(Russia) V Ivanov (Russia) I Sozonov	19	21	19
(Japan) H Endo (Japan) K Hayakawa	21	19	21
(Japan) N Kawamae (Japan) S Sato	21	21
(Netherlands) R Bosch (Netherlands) K Ridder	16	18

Quarterfinals
(Japan) H Endo (Japan) K Hayakawa	21	21
(Japan) N Kawamae (Japan) S Sato	14	16

=== Bottom half ===
==== Section 3 ====
First Round
Q3	(Netherlands) J Arends (Netherlands) J Maas	17	21	18
PFQ	(Thailand) S Anugritayawon (Thailand) S Prapakamol	21	14	21
(Canada) A Liu (Canada) D Ng	17	17
7	(Indonesia) M Kido (Indonesia) H Setiawan	21	21
(China) Hong W (China) Shen Y	21	21
(England) C Adcock (England) A Ellis	14	9
Q2	(Malaysia) Lim KW (Malaysia) Ong JG	17	15
4	(Indonesia) M Ahsan (Indonesia) B Septano	21	21

Second Round
PFQ	(Thailand) S Anugritayawon (Thailand) S Prapakamol	9	11
7	(Indonesia) M Kido (Indonesia) H Setiawan	21	21
(China) Hong W (China) Shen Y	21	21
4	(Indonesia) M Ahsan (Indonesia) B Septano	12	13

Quarterfinals
7	(Indonesia) M Kido (Indonesia) H Setiawan	16	10
(China) Hong W (China) Shen Y	21	21

==== Section 4 ====
First Round
(Russia) V Durkin (Russia) A Nikolaenko	16	13
(Germany) I Kindervater (Germany) J Schoettler	21	21
(India) R Kumar (India) S Thomas	21	13	23
5	(Japan) H Hashimoto (Japan) N Hirata	17	21	25
(Chinese Taipei) Chen HL (Chinese Taipei) Lin Y-L	21	21
Q1	(Germany) P Kaesbauer (Germany) J Zurwonne	16	6
(Austria) J Koch (Austria) P Zauner	14	15
2	(South Korea) Ko S-H (South Korea) Yoo Y-S	21	21

Second Round
(Germany) I Kindervater (Germany) J Schoettler	26	12
5	(Japan) H Hashimoto (Japan) N Hirata	28	21
(Chinese Taipei) Chen HL (Chinese Taipei) Lin Y-L	15	19
2	(South Korea) Ko S-H (South Korea) Yoo Y-S	21	21

Quarterfinals
5	(Japan) H Hashimoto (Japan) N Hirata	19	12
2	(South Korea) Ko S-H (South Korea) Yoo Y-S	21	21

== Women's doubles ==
=== Seeds ===
1. (South Korea) Ha Jung-Eun / Kim Min-Jung (first round)
2. (Japan) Mizuki Fujii / Reika Kakiiwa (semi-final)
3. (Japan) Miyuki Maeda / Satoko Suetsuna (quarter-final)
4. (Japan) Shizuka Matsuo / Mami Naito (second round)
5. (Chinese Taipei) Cheng Wen-Hsing / Chien Yu-Chin (quarter-final)
6. (Indonesia) Meiliana Jauhari / Greysia Polii (second round)
7. (South Korea) Jung Kyung-Eun / Kim Ha-Na (final)
8. (China) Xia Huan / Tang Jinhua (champion)

=== Finals ===
Semifinals
(China) Cheng Shu (China) Pan Pan	21	12	17
8	(China) Xia Huan (China) Tang Jinhua	17	21	21
7	(South Korea) Jung Kyung-Eun (South Korea) Kim Ha-Na	23	18	21
2	(Japan) Mizuki Fujii (Japan) Reika Kakiiwa	21	21	19

Final
8	(China) Xia Huan (China) Tang Jinhua	23	21
7	(South Korea) Jung Kyung-Eun (South Korea) Kim Ha-Na	21	13

=== Top half ===
==== Section 1 ====
First Round
1	(South Korea) Ha J-E (South Korea) Kim M-J	21	14	18
(Singapore) S Sari (Singapore) Yao L	17	21	21
(Germany) S Marinello (Germany) B Michels	21	21
(Hong Kong) Poon LY (Hong Kong) Tse YS	18	17
6	(Indonesia) M Jauhari (Indonesia) G Polii	19	21	21
(Thailand) D Aroonkesorn (Thailand) K Voravichitchaikul	21	19	19
(China) Cheng S (China) Pan P	21	21
Q3	(Thailand) S Amitrapai (Thailand) S Taerattanachai	14	15

Second Round
(Singapore) S Sari (Singapore) Yao L	21	8	18
(Germany) S Marinello (Germany) B Michels	15	21	21
6	(Indonesia) M Jauhari (Indonesia) G Polii	18	7
(China) Cheng S (China) Pan P	21	21

Quarterfinals
(Germany) S Marinello (Germany) B Michels	14	13
(China) Cheng S (China) Pan P	21	21

==== Section 2 ====
First Round
3	(Japan) M Maeda (Japan) S Suetsuna	21	21
(Russia) V Sorokina (Russia) N Vislova	10	18
(Malaysia) V Hoo (Malaysia) Woon KW	21	21
Q4	(South Korea) Choi H-I (South Korea) Kim S-Y	17	16
8	(China) Xia H (China) Tang JH	21	21
(United States) E Lee (United States) P Obanana	7	14
Q1	(Chinese Taipei) Hsieh P-C (Chinese Taipei) Wang P-R	21	21
(Canada) A Bruce (Canada) M Li	12	14

Second Round
3	(Japan) M Maeda (Japan) S Suetsuna	21	21
(Malaysia) V Hoo (Malaysia) Woon KW	13	14
8	(China) Xia H (China) Tang JH	21	21
Q1	(Chinese Taipei) Hsieh P-C (Chinese Taipei) Wang P-R	18	13

Quarterfinals
3	(Japan) M Maeda (Japan) S Suetsuna	14	21	21
8	(China) Xia H (China) Tang JH	21	7	23

=== Bottom half ===
==== Section 3 ====
First Round
(Malaysia) Wong PT (Malaysia) Chin EH	21	21
(Sweden) E Lennartsson (Sweden) E Wengberg	15	17
(Netherlands) L Jonathans (Chinese Taipei) P van Dooremalen	21	19	10
7	(South Korea) Jung K-E (South Korea) Kim H-N	17	21	21
(Japan) M Matsutomo (Japan) A Takahashi	21	21
Q2	(Denmark) L Grebak (Denmark) M Helsbol	13	17
(England) M Agathangelou (England) H Olver	9	9
4	(Japan) S Matsuo (Japan) M Naito	21	21

Second Round
(Malaysia) Wong PT (Malaysia) Chin EH	13	21	17
7	(South Korea) Jung K-E (South Korea) Kim H-N	21	19	21
(Japan) M Matsutomo (Japan) A Takahashi	21	21
4	(Japan) S Matsuo (Japan) M Naito	14	10

Quarterfinals
7	(South Korea) Jung K-E (South Korea) Kim H-N	16	25	21
(Japan) M Matsutomo (Japan) A Takahashi	21	23	11

==== Section 4 ====
First Round
(India) J Gutta (India) A Ponnappa	21	21
(Canada) N Grether (Canada) C Reid	14	16
(South Korea) Eom H-W (South Korea) Jang Y-N	18	10
5	(Chinese Taipei) Cheng W-H (Chinese Taipei) Chien Y-C	21	21
(Indonesia) V Marissa (Indonesia) N Melati	16	8
(China) Ma J (China) Zhong QX	21	21
(United States) I Wang (United States) R Wang	17	16
2	(Japan) M Fujii (Japan) R Kakiiwa	21	21

Second Round
(India) J Gutta (India) A Ponnappa	14	21	12
5	(Chinese Taipei) Cheng W-H (Chinese Taipei) Chien Y-C	21	17	21
(China) Ma J (China) Zhong QX	10	19
2	(Japan) M Fujii (Japan) R Kakiiwa	21	21

Quarterfinals
5	(Chinese Taipei) Cheng W-H (Chinese Taipei) Chien Y-C	19	14
2	(Japan) M Fujii (Japan) R Kakiiwa	21	21

== Mixed doubles ==
=== Seeds ===
1. (Chinese Taipei) Chen Hung-Ling / Cheng Wen-Hsing (second round)
2. (Thailand) Sudket Prapakamol / Saralee Thoungthongkam (semi-final)
3. (South Korea) Lee Yong-Dae / Ha Jung-Eun (final)
4. (Denmark) Thomas Laybourn / Kamilla Rytter Juhl (champion)
5. (Malaysia) Chan Peng Soon / Goh Liu Ying (first round)
6. (Japan) Shintaro Ikeda / Reiko Shiota (second round)
7. (Thailand) Songphon Anugritayawon / Kunchala Voravichitchaikul (second round)
8. (Germany) Michael Fuchs / Birgit Michels (quarter-final)

=== Finals ===
Semifinals
(Japan) Shoji Sato (Japan) Shizuka Matsuo	23	16	10
3	(South Korea) Lee Yong-Dae (South Korea) Ha Jung-Eun	21	21	21
4	(Denmark) Thomas Laybourn (Denmark) Kamilla Rytter Juhl	21	21
2	(Thailand) Sudket Prapakamol (Thailand) Saralee Thoungthongkam	15	14

Final
3	(South Korea) Lee Yong-Dae (South Korea) Ha Jung-Eun	9	16
4	(Denmark) Thomas Laybourn (Denmark) Kamilla Rytter Juhl	21	21

=== Top half ===
==== Section 1 ====
First Round
1	(Chinese Taipei) Chen H-L (Chinese Taipei) Chen W-H	23	21	21
PFQ	(Malaysia) Tan AQ (Malaysia) Lai PJ	25	19	11
PFQ	(Poland) W Szkudlarczyk (Poland) A Wojtkowska	18	19
(South Korea) Kim K-J (South Korea) Jung K-E	21	21
7	(Thailand) S Anugritayawon (Thailand) K Voravichitchaikul	21	21
Q4	(Chinese Taipei) Lin Y-L (Chinese Taipei) Hsieh P-C	19	17
(Republic of Ireland) S Magee (Republic of Ireland) C Magee	11	12
(Japan) S Sato (Japan) S Matsuo	21	21

Second Round
1	(Chinese Taipei) Chen H-L (Chinese Taipei) Chen W-H	19	22
(South Korea) Kim K-J (South Korea) Jung K-E	21	24
7	(Thailand) S Anugritayawon (Thailand) K Voravichitchaikul	18	14
(Japan) S Sato (Japan) S Matsuo	21	21

Quarterfinals
(South Korea) Kim K-J (South Korea) Jung K-E	13	21
(Japan) S Sato (Japan) S Matsuo	21	23

==== Section 2 ====
First Round
3	(South Korea) Lee Y-D (South Korea) Ha J-E	7	24	21
(China) Tao JM (China) Xia H	21	22	12
(Hong Kong) Wong WH (Hong Kong) Chau HW	18	21	21
(India) V Diju (India) J Gutta	21	9	19
8	(Germany) M Fuchs (Germany) B Michels	21	21
Q3	(China) Qiu ZH (China) Tang JH	17	19
(Singapore) C Triyachart (Singapore) Yao L	15	21	22
(England) C Adcock (Scotland) I Bankier	21	18	20

Second Round
3	(South Korea) Lee Y-D (South Korea) Ha J-E	21	21
(Hong Kong) Wong WH (Hong Kong) Chau HW	17	19
8	(Germany) M Fuchs (Germany) B Michels	21	21
(Singapore) C Triyachart (Singapore) Yao L	15	10

Quarterfinals
3	(South Korea) Lee Y-D (South Korea) Ha J-E	21	21
8	(Germany) M Fuchs (Germany) B Michels	8	10

=== Bottom half ===
==== Section 3 ====
First Round
(South Korea) Yoo Y-S (South Korea) Jang Y-N	21	21
PFQ	(Netherlands) D Khodabux (Netherlands) S Piek	15	15
(South Korea) Ko S-H (South Korea) Eom H-W	21	12	18
6	(Japan) S Ikeda (Japan) R Shiota	15	21	21
(Thailand) M Jongjit (Thailand) S Amitrapai	8	16
Q2	(Indonesia) H Setiawan (Indonesia) V Marissa	21	21
(Russia) A Nikolaenko (Russia) V Sorokina	15	11
4	(Denmark) T Laybourn (Denmark) K Juhl	21	21

Second Round
(South Korea) Yoo Y-S (South Korea) Jang Y-N	21	21
6	(Japan) S Ikeda (Japan) R Shiota	17	10
Q2	(Indonesia) H Setiawan (Indonesia) V Marissa	14	17
4	(Denmark) T Laybourn (Denmark) K Juhl	21	21

Quarterfinals
(South Korea) Yoo Y-S (South Korea) Jang Y-N	19	13
4	(Denmark) T Laybourn (Denmark) K Juhl	21	21

==== Section 4 ====
First Round
(China) Hong W (China) Pan P	21	21
(Canada) T Ng (Canada) G Gao	15	19
(Indonesia) M Rijal (Indonesia) D Susanto	19	21	21
5	(Malaysia) Chan PS (Malaysia) Goh LY	21	18	18
(Singapore) D Chrisnanta (Singapore) V Neo	21	15	21
Q1	(Germany) P Kaesbauer (Germany) J Goliszewski	19	21	14
(England) N Robertson (England) J Wallwork	21	14	14
2	(Thailand) S Prapakamol (Thailand) S Thoungthongkam	19	21	21

Second Round
(China) Hong W (China) Pan P	20	16
(Indonesia) M Rijal (Indonesia) D Susanto	22	21
(Singapore) D Chrisnanta (Singapore) V Neo	15	15
2	(Thailand) S Prapakamol (Thailand) S Thoungthongkam	21	21

Quarterfinals
(Indonesia) M Rijal (Indonesia) D Susanto	15	21	15
2	(Thailand) S Prapakamol (Thailand) S Thoungthongkam	21	16	21

Preceded by 2011 India Open Grand Prix Gold	BWF Grand Prix Gold and Grand Prix; 2012 season	Succeeded by 2012 Swiss Open Grand Prix Gold
