= Simon Santoso =

Indonesian badminton player (born 1985)

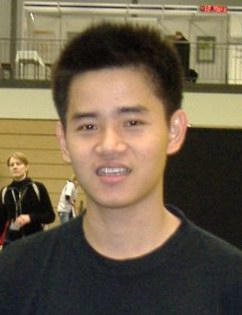

Personal information
- Born: 29 July 1985 (age 41) Tegal, Central Java, Indonesia
- Height: 1.75 m (5 ft 9 in)
- Weight: 65 kg (143 lb)

Sport
- Country: Indonesia
- Sport: Badminton
- Handedness: Right

Men's singles
- Highest ranking: 3 (26 August 2010)
- BWF profile
Medal record
Men's badminton
Representing Indonesia
Sudirman Cup
Silver medal – second place	2005 Beijing	Mixed team
Silver medal – second place	2007 Glasgow	Mixed team
Bronze medal – third place	2009 Guangzhou	Mixed team
Bronze medal – third place	2011 Qingdao	Mixed team
Thomas Cup
Silver medal – second place	2010 Kuala Lumpur	Men's team
Bronze medal – third place	2004 Jakarta	Men's team
Bronze medal – third place	2006 Sendai & Tokyo	Men's team
Bronze medal – third place	2008 Jakarta	Men's team
Bronze medal – third place	2014 New Delhi	Men's team
Asian Games
Bronze medal – third place	2006 Doha	Men's team
Bronze medal – third place	2010 Guangzhou	Men's team
SEA Games
Gold medal – first place	2003 Vietnam	Men's team
Gold medal – first place	2007 Nakhon Ratchasima	Men's team
Gold medal – first place	2009 Vientiane	Men's singles
Gold medal – first place	2009 Vientiane	Men's team
Gold medal – first place	2011 Jakarta–Palembang	Men's singles
Gold medal – first place	2011 Jakarta–Palembang	Men's team
Silver medal – second place	2005 Manila	Men's singles
Silver medal – second place	2005 Manila	Men's team
World Junior Championships
Bronze medal – third place	2002 Pretoria	Mixed team
Asian Junior Championships
Gold medal – first place	2002 Kuala Lumpur	Boys' team
Bronze medal – third place	2002 Kuala Lumpur	Boys' singles

Simon Santoso (born 29 July 1985) is an Indonesian former badminton player. He was two-time SEA Games men's singles champion winning in 2009 and 2011, also featured in Indonesia team that won the men's team title in 2003, 2007, 2009, and 2011. Santoso won the Indonesia Open a Superseries Premier tournament in 2012. He reached a career high as world number 3 in August 2010.

== Career ==
When he was young, Santoso joined the Tangkas Jakarta badminton club before joining the Indonesian National team. In 2005, he won the Vietnam Satellite and the silver medal at the 2005 SEA Games. His best results on the world circuit until recently were runner-up finishes at the 2008 Singapore, 2007 Swiss, and 2008 Indonesia Open. He was eliminated at the semi-finals in the Japan Open Super Series and the Chinese Taipei Open. In September 2008, Santoso won the Chinese Taipei Open after defeating Roslin Hashim from Malaysia in the final round by scores of 21–18, 13–21, 21–10.

In October 2009, he won his first Superseries ever in Denmark Open, after beating Marc Zwiebler of Germany in the final round, 21–14, 21–6. He won gold in the 2009 SEA Games by defeating Sony Dwi Kuncoro.

In 2011, he retained his gold medal in SEA Games by beating Tanongsak Saensomboonsuk in 3 sets.

In 2012, he helped Indonesia Garuda to win the inaugural Axiata Cup. In June 2012, he won Indonesia Open Superseries Premier title 21–18, 13–21, 21–11 after defeating Du Pengyu of China in the final.

== Personal life ==
Born in Tegal, Central Java, Santoso is the youngest of four children of Hosea Liem (father) and Rahel Yanti (mother). His hobbies are swimming and reading comics. He married Evelyn Carmelita on 6 December 2014, and now have two children.

== Achievements ==
=== SEA Games ===
Men's singles
Year	Venue	Opponent	Score	Result	Ref.
2005	PhilSports Arena; Pasig, Philippines	(Indonesia) Sony Dwi Kuncoro	16–17, 3–15	Silver	
2009	Gym Hall 1, National Sports Complex; Vientiane, Laos	(Indonesia) Sony Dwi Kuncoro	21–16, 21–12	Gold	
2011	Istora Senayan; Jakarta, Indonesia	(Thailand) Tanongsak Saensomboonsuk	21–10, 11–21, 21–19	Gold	

=== Asian Junior Championships ===
Boys' singles
Year	Venue	Opponent	Score	Result	Ref.
2002	Kuala Lumpur Badminton Stadium; Kuala Lumpur, Malaysia	(South Korea) Park Sung-hwan	7–15, 8–15	Bronze	

=== BWF Superseries (3 titles, 4 runners-up) ===
The BWF Superseries, which was launched on 14 December 2006 and implemented in 2007, is a series of elite badminton tournaments, sanctioned by the Badminton World Federation (BWF). BWF Superseries levels are Superseries and Superseries Premier. A season of Superseries consists of twelve tournaments around the world that have been introduced since 2011. Successful players are invited to the Superseries Finals, which are held at the end of each year.

Men's singles
Year	Tournament	Opponent	Score	Result	Ref.
2007	Swiss Open	(China) Chen Jin	16–21, 10–21	(silver) Runner-up	
2008	Singapore Open	(Malaysia) Lee Chong Wei	13–21, 5–21	(silver) Runner-up	
2008	Indonesia Open	(Indonesia) Sony Dwi Kuncoro	21–19, 14–21, 9–21	(silver) Runner-up	
2009	Denmark Open (1)	(Germany) Marc Zwiebler	21–14, 21–6	(gold) Winner	
2012	Indonesia Open (1)	(China) Du Pengyu	21–18, 13–21, 21–11	(gold) Winner	
2014	Singapore Open (1)	(Malaysia) Lee Chong Wei	21–15, 21–10	(gold) Winner	
2014	Australian Open	(China) Lin Dan	24–22, 16–21, 7–21	(silver) Runner-up	

BWF Super Series Finals tournament
BWF Super Series Premier tournament
BWF Super Series tournament

=== BWF Grand Prix (4 titles, 1 runner-up) ===
The BWF Grand Prix had two levels, the BWF Grand Prix and Grand Prix Gold. It was a series of badminton tournaments sanctioned by the Badminton World Federation (BWF) which was held from 2007 to 2017.

Men's singles
Year	Tournament	Opponent	Score	Result	Ref.
2008	Chinese Taipei Open (1)	(Malaysia) Roslin Hashim	21–18, 13–21, 21–10	(gold) Winner	
2010	Chinese Taipei Open (2)	(South Korea) Son Wan-ho	21–14, 21–11	(gold) Winner	
2012	German Open	(China) Lin Dan	11–21, 11–21	(silver) Runner-up	
2013	Indonesia Grand Prix Gold (1)	(Indonesia) Dionysius Hayom Rumbaka	21–17, 21–11	(gold) Winner	
2014	Malaysia Grand Prix Gold (1)	(India) Sourabh Varma	15–21, 21–16, 21–19	(gold) Winner	

BWF Grand Prix Gold tournament
BWF Grand Prix tournament

=== IBF International (1 title, 1 runner-up) ===
Men's singles
Year	Tournament	Opponent	Score	Result	Ref.
2003	Singapore Satellite	(Singapore) Ronald Susilo	5–15, 3–15	(silver) Runner-up	
2005	Vietnam Satellite	(South Korea) Jung Hoon-min	15–2, 15–3	(gold) Winner	

== Performance timeline ==
=== National team ===
- Junior level

Team events	2002
Asian Junior Championships	Gold
World Junior Championships	Bronze

- Senior level

Team events	2004	2005	2006	2007	2008	2009	2010	2011	2012	2013	2014
SEA Games	—N/a	Silver	—N/a	Gold	—N/a	Gold	—N/a	Gold	—N/a		
Asian Games	—N/a		Bronze	—N/a			Bronze	—N/a			A
Thomas Cup	Bronze	—N/a	Bronze	—N/a	Bronze	—N/a	Silver	—N/a	QF	—N/a	Bronze
Sudirman Cup	—N/a	Silver	—N/a	Silver	—N/a	Bronze	—N/a	Bronze	—N/a	A	—N/a

=== Individual competitions ===
- Junior level

Event	2002
Asian Junior Championships	Bronze
World Junior Championships	

- Senior level

Event	2005	2006	2007	2008	2009	2010	2011	2012	2013	2014
SEA Games	Silver	—N/a	A	—N/a	Gold	—N/a	Gold	—N/a	A	—N/a
Asian Championships	w/d	QF	R3	R3	A			R2	A	
Asian Games	—N/a	R2	—N/a			A	—N/a			A
World Championships	A		R3	—N/a	QF	R2	R3	—N/a	R1	w/d
Olympic Games	—N/a			A	—N/a			R16	—N/a	

Tournament	2007	2008	2009	2010	2011	2012	2013	2014	2015	2016	Best
BWF Superseries
All England Open	R2	A	R1	R2	R1	R1	A		Q2	A	R2 (2004, 2007, 2010)
Swiss Open	F	A	R1	A	GPG						F (2007)
India Open	—N/a	GPG			R1	R1	R1	A			R1 (2011, 2012, 2013)
Malaysia Open	A	QF	QF	w/d	SF	QF	A	Q1	A		SF (2011)
Singapore Open	R2	F	R2	QF	QF	w/d	A	W	SF	A	W (2014)
Australian Open	IC/IS		GPG					F	Q1	w/d	F (2014)
Indonesia Open	R2	F	R2	QF	R1	W	A	R2	A		W (2012)
Japan Open	SF	R2	SF	A	QF	SF	A				SF (2007, 2009, 2012)
Korea Open	A	R2	SF	A	SF	QF	A	R1	A		SF (2009, 2011)
China Masters	R2	A						GPG			R2 (2007)
Denmark Open	QF	w/d	W	A	R2	R2	A				W (2009)
French Open	R2	w/d	R2	A		w/d	A				R2 (2007, 2009)
China Open	R1	A	QF	A	SF	A					SF (2011)
Hong Kong Open	R1	A	QF	A				R1	A		QF (2003, 2009)
BWF Superseries Finals	DNQ				GS	DNQ					GS (2011)
Year-end ranking			6	27	7	7	67	24	113	188	3
Tournament	2007	2008	2009	2010	2011	2012	2013	2014	2015	2016	Best

Tournament	2007	2008	2009	2010	2011	2012	2013	2014	2015	2016	Best
BWF Grand Prix and Grand Prix Gold
Malaysia Masters	—N/a		A		w/d	A	w/d	W	A	R2	W (2014)
Thailand Masters	—N/a									R3	R3 (2016)
Syed Modi International	—N/a		A		R3	R3	—N/a	A			R3 (2011, 2012)
German Open	R1	A				F	A		R1	A	F (2012)
Swiss Open	SS				SF	w/d	A				F (2007)
New Zealand Open	A			—N/a	IC	—N/a	QF	A	R1	A	QF (2013)
Australian Open	IC/IS		A			SF	R3	SS			SF (2012)
Chinese Taipei Open	SF	W	A	W	R3	A		R3	R1	A	W (2008, 2010)
Vietnam Open	A						SF	A			SF (2013)
Thailand Open	R3	A		—N/a	A				R3	w/d	QF (2004)
Chinese Taipei Masters	—N/a								SF	A	SF (2005)
Korea Masters	IC			A			QF	A			QF (2013)
Macau Open	A	w/d	A	SF	SF	A					SF (2010, 2011)
Indonesian Masters	—N/a			A	R1	QF	W	A		R2	W (2013)
Tournament	2007	2008	2009	2010	2011	2012	2013	2014	2015	2016	Best

Tournament	2002	2003	2004	2005	2006	Best
IBF World Grand Prix
All England Open	A		R2	A		R2 (2004)
German Open	A				QF	QF (2006)
Swiss Open	A		R1	A	R2	R2 (2006)
Indonesia Open	Q2	Q4	R3	QF	QF	QF (2005, 2006)
Malaysia Open	A	R2	A	R2	A	R2 (2003, 2005)
Thailand Open	—N/a	R3	QF	A		QF (2004)
Singapore Open	A		R2	R2	R3	R3 (2006)
Chinese Taipei Open	A	R1	A			R1 (2003)
Korea Open	A		w/d	R3	R3	R3 (2005, 2006)
Hong Kong Open	—N/a	QF	—N/a	R1	R2	QF (2003)
Japan Open	A		R1	A	R3	R3 (2006)
China Open	A			R2	A	R2 (2005)
Denmark Open	A		R3	A		R3 (2004)

== Participation at Indonesian Team ==
- 4 times at Sudirman Cup (2005, 2007, 2009, 2011)
- 6 times at Thomas Cup (2004, 2006, 2008, 2010, 2012, 2014)

== Record against selected opponents ==
Includes results against athletes who competed in Super Series finals, World Championships semi-finals, and Olympic quarterfinals.

- (China) Bao Chunlai 0–4
- (China) Chen Hong 0–1
- (China) Chen Jin 1–7
- (China) Chen Long 0–3
- (China) Chen Yu 1–2
- (China) Du Pengyu 3–2
- (China) Lin Dan 1–11
- (China) Tian Houwei 1–1
- (Denmark) Viktor Axelsen 1–0
- (Denmark) Peter Gade 4–11
- (Denmark) Jan Ø. Jørgensen 3–0
- (Denmark) Hans-Kristian Vittinghus 0–2
- (India) Parupalli Kashyap 4–0
- (Indonesia) Sony Dwi Kuncoro 1–1
- (Indonesia) Taufik Hidayat 5–5
- (Indonesia) Tommy Sugiarto 3–0
- (Japan) Kento Momota 1–1
- (Japan) Sho Sasaki 6–2
- (South Korea) Lee Hyun-il 1–5
- (South Korea) Park Sung-hwan 1–2
- (South Korea) Shon Seung-mo 1–0
- (South Korea) Son Wan-ho 3–1
- (Malaysia) Lee Chong Wei 2–9
- (Malaysia) Liew Daren 0–2
- (Malaysia) Wong Choong Hann 3–1
- (Singapore) Ronald Susilo 1–1
- (Thailand) Boonsak Ponsana 3–5
