= Badminton at the 2011 SEA Games – Men's singles =

These are the results of the men's singles competition in badminton at the 2011 SEA Games in Jakarta.

== Medal winners ==
Gold	Silver	Bronze
Simon Santoso (INA)	Tanongsak Saensomboonsuk (THA)	Taufik Hidayat (INA) Derek Wong (SIN)

== Draw ==
=== Top half ===
First round
1	(Indonesia) Taufik Hidayat
Bye
(Vietnam) Lê Hà Anh
Bye
(Philippines) Antonino Benjamin Gadi
Bye
(Malaysia) Liew Daren
Bye
4	(Thailand) Tanongsak Saensomboonsuk
Bye
(Myanmar) Myo Min Tun
Bye
(Cambodia) Chin Dethputhicheat
Bye
(Laos) Xaychaleun Xayasit	6	5
(Singapore) Ashton Chen	21	21

Second round
1	(Indonesia) Taufik Hidayat	21	21
(Vietnam) Lê Hà Anh	17	9
(Philippines) Antonino Benjamin Gadi	11	10
(Malaysia) Liew Daren	21	21
4	(Thailand) Tanongsak Saensomboonsuk	21	21
(Myanmar) Myo Min Tun	17	13
(Cambodia) Chin Dethputhicheat	5	11
(Singapore) Ashton Chen	21	21

Quarterfinals
1	(Indonesia) Taufik Hidayat	22	21
(Malaysia) Liew Daren	20	12
4	(Thailand) Tanongsak Saensomboonsuk	21	21
(Singapore) Ashton Chen	13	11

Semifinals
1	(Indonesia) Taufik Hidayat	14	19
4	(Thailand) Tanongsak Saensomboonsuk	21	21

=== Bottom half ===
First round
(Myanmar) Ye Min Aung	21	21
(Cambodia) Teav Yongvannak	13	13
Bye
(Thailand) Suppanyu Avihingsanon
Bye
(Malaysia) Mohd Arif Abdul Latif
Bye
3	(Indonesia) Simon Santoso
Bye
(Singapore) Derek Wong
Bye
(Laos) Phongthanom Ouankhamchanh
Bye
(Philippines) Peter Gabriel Magnaye
Bye
2	(Vietnam) Nguyễn Tiến Minh

Second round
(Myanmar) Ye Min Aung	12	11
(Thailand) Suppanyu Avihingsanon	21	21
(Malaysia) Mohd Arif Abdul Latif	11	21	17
3	(Indonesia) Simon Santoso	21	12	21
(Singapore) Derek Wong	21	21
(Laos) Phongthanom Ouankhamchanh	10	4
(Philippines) Peter Gabriel Magnaye	11	6
2	(Vietnam) Nguyễn Tiến Minh	21	21

Quarterfinals
(Thailand) Suppanyu Avihingsanon	13	12
3	(Indonesia) Simon Santoso	21	21
(Singapore) Derek Wong	21	21
2	(Vietnam) Nguyễn Tiến Minh	14	15

Semifinals
3	(Indonesia) Simon Santoso	21	21
(Singapore) Derek Wong	17	12

=== Finals ===
Semifinals
1	(Indonesia) Taufik Hidayat	14	19
4	(Thailand) Tanongsak Saensomboonsuk	21	21
3	(Indonesia) Simon Santoso	21	21
(Singapore) Derek Wong	17	12

Final
4	(Thailand) Tanongsak Saensomboonsuk	10	21	19
3	(Indonesia) Simon Santoso	21	11	21
