= 2016 Denmark Super Series Premier =

Tournament details
- Dates: 18 – 23 October 2016
- Level: Super Series Premier
- Total prize money: US$700,000
- Venue: Odense Sports Park
- Location: Odense, Denmark

Champions
- Men's singles: (Thailand) Tanongsak Saensomboonsuk
- Women's singles: (Japan) Akane Yamaguchi
- Men's doubles: (Malaysia) Goh V Shem (Malaysia) Tan Wee Kiong
- Women's doubles: (Japan) Misaki Matsutomo (Japan) Ayaka Takahashi
- Mixed doubles: (Denmark) Joachim Fischer Nielsen (Denmark) Christinna Pedersen

The 2016 Denmark Super Series Premier was the ninth Super Series tournament of the 2016 BWF Super Series. The tournament took place in Odense, Denmark on October 18–23, 2016, and had a total prize of $700,000.

== Men's singles ==
=== Seeds ===
1. (Malaysia) Lee Chong Wei (quarterfinal)
2. (Denmark) Viktor Axelsen (second round)
3. (Denmark) Jan Ø. Jørgensen (first round)
4. (China) Tian Houwei (second round)
5. (Chinese Taipei) Chou Tien-chen (second round)
6. (South Korea) Son Wan-ho (final)
7. (Hong Kong) Ng Ka Long (second round)
8. (England) Rajiv Ouseph (second round)
Qualification

=== Qualifying draw ===
==== Qualifier 1 ====
First Round
PFR	(Denmark) C L Thomsen	20	18
(Malaysia) Chong W F	22	21
PFR	(Norway) M Myhre	11	21	21
(France) T Rouxel	21	18	19

Second Round
(Malaysia) Chong W F	15	21	21
(Norway) M Myhre	21	16	6

==== Qualifier 2 ====
First Round
4	(Denmark) A Antonsen	21	21
(Republic of Ireland) S Evans	12	16
PFR	(Sweden) M Borg	21	21
(South Korea) Heo K-h	10	19

Second Round
4	(Denmark) A Antonsen	21	21
PFR	(Sweden) M Borg	14	9

==== Qualifier 3 ====
First Round
(Estonia) R Must	21	8	22
(India) P Kashyap	13	21	20
(Thailand) K Phetpradab	21	21
PFR	(Mexico) J Castillo	10	13

Second Round
(Estonia) R Must	15	15
(Thailand) K Phetpradab	21	21

==== Qualifier 4 ====
First Round
(France) L Claerbout	23	11	21
(Chinese Taipei) Lin Y-h	21	21	17
(Denmark) K Bruun	21	21
PFR	(Belgium) M Moreels	15	15

Second Round
(France) L Claerbout	11	21	21
(Denmark) K Bruun	21	19	19

=== Top half ===
First Round
1	(Malaysia) Lee C W	16	21	21
(Hong Kong) Wei N	21	19	11
Q1	(Malaysia) Chong W F	13	21	20
(India) H. S. Prannoy	21	19	22
5	(Chinese Taipei) Chou T-c	22	21
(Hong Kong) Hu Y	20	5
(Malaysia) Z Zulkiffli	22	12	14
(France) B Leverdez	20	21	21
4	(China) Tian HW	21	21
(Spain) P Abián	13	15
(India) B. S Praneeth	21	19	15
(Thailand) T Saensomboonsuk	17	21	21
8	(England) R Ouseph	21	17	21
(Malaysia) I Z Zainuddin	8	21	17
Q2	(Denmark) A Antonsen	21	21
(Chinese Taipei) Hsu J-h	10	13

Second Round
1	(Malaysia) Lee C W	21	22
(India) H. S. Prannoy	10	20
5	(Chinese Taipei) Chou T-c	19	17
(France) B Leverdez	21	21
4	(China) Tian HW	16	15
(Thailand) T Saensomboonsuk	21	21
8	(England) R Ouseph	21	20	14
Q2	(Denmark) A Antonsen	15	22	21

Quarterfinals
1	(Malaysia) Lee C W	17	22	19
(France) B Leverdez	21	20	21
(Thailand) T Saensomboonsuk	21	14	21
Q2	(Denmark) A Antonsen	17	21	15

Semifinals
(France) B Leverdez	9	13
(Thailand) T Saensomboonsuk	21	21

=== Bottom half ===
First Round
PFQ	(China) Qiao B	21	18	19
(Germany) M Zwiebler	17	21	21
(Denmark) H-K Vittinghus	16	15
6	(South Korea) Son W-h	21	21
(India) A Jayaram	21	21
(Thailand) B Ponsana	15	16
PFQ	(China) Shi YQ	21	19	21
3	(Denmark) J Ø Jørgensen	16	21	14
Q3	(Thailand) K Phetpradab	14	11
(Hong Kong) Wong W K	21	21
Q4	(France) L Claerbout	21	8
7	(Hong Kong) Ng K L	23	21
(South Korea) Lee H-i	14	21	21
(Chinese Taipei) Wang T-w	21	15	15
(South Korea) Jeon H-j	14	24	10
2	(Denmark) V Axelsen	21	22	21

Second Round
(Germany) M Zwiebler	18	11
6	(South Korea) Son W-h	21	21
(India) A Jayaram	21	15
PFQ	(China) Shi YQ	23	21
(Hong Kong) Wong W K	21	21
7	(Hong Kong) Ng K L	17	10
(South Korea) Lee H-i	7	21	21
2	(Denmark) V Axelsen	21	13	14

Quarterfinals
6	(South Korea) Son W-h	21	15	21
PFQ	(China) Shi YQ	13	21	18
(Hong Kong) Wong W K	21	13	13
(South Korea) Lee H-i	6	21	21

Semifinals
6	(South Korea) Son W-h	21	21
(South Korea) Lee H-i	14	16

=== Finals ===
Semifinals
(France) B Leverdez	9	13
(Thailand) T Saensomboonsuk	21	21
6	(South Korea) Son W-h	21	21
(South Korea) Lee H-i	14	16

Final
(Thailand) T Saensomboonsuk	21	23
6	(South Korea) Son W-h	13	21

== Women's singles ==
=== Seeds ===
1. (Spain) Carolina Marín (semifinal)
2. (Thailand) Ratchanok Intanon (withdrew)
3. (Japan) Nozomi Okuhara (quarterfinal)
4. (South Korea) Sung Ji-hyun (quarterfinal)
5. (Chinese Taipei) Tai Tzu-ying
6. (India) P.V. Sindhu (second round)
7. (China) Sun Yu (quarterfinal)
8. (Japan) Akane Yamaguchi (champion)
Qualification

=== Qualifying draw ===
==== Qualifier 1 ====
First Round
1	(Mauritius) K F Kune
BYE
(Slovakia) M Repiska	20	27	19
(Denmark) A H Hansen	22	25	21

Second Round
1	(Mauritius) K F Kune	w	/	o
(Denmark) A H Hansen

==== Qualifier 2 ====
First Round
4	(Chinese Taipei) Chiang M-h	w	/	o
(Denmark) J D Jakobsen
(Denmark) C Martens	21	15	11
(Denmark) S H Dahl	17	21	21

Second Round
(Denmark) J D Jakobsen	21	21
(Denmark) S H Dahl	12	11

==== Qualifier 3 ====
First Round
(South Korea) Kim N-y	10	21	21
(Denmark) I A Andersen	21	13	16
(Denmark) M Blichfeldt
3	(Denmark) M Poulsen	n	/	m

Second Round
(South Korea) Kim N-y	21	21
(Denmark) M Blichfeldt	14	19

==== Qualifier 4 ====
First Round
(Denmark) J Finne-Ipsen	21	21
(Switzerland) N Fankhauser	10	10
BYE
2	(Russia) K Polikarpova

Second Round
(Denmark) J Finne-Ipsen
2	(Russia) K Polikarpova	w	/	o

=== Top half ===
First Round
1	(Spain) C Marín	21	16	24
Q2	(Denmark) J D Jakobsen	13	21	22
PFQ	(Mauritius) K F Kune	17	19
Q3	(South Korea) Kim N-y	21	21
7	(China) Sun Y	21	21
(South Korea) Kim H-m	9	14
PFQ	(Denmark) M Poulsen	21	21
Q1	(Denmark) A H Hansen	9	16
3	(Japan) N Okuhara	21	24
(Hong Kong) Yip P Y	11	22
(Japan) M Mitani	21	21
(Czech Republic) K Gavnholt	9	11
8	(Japan) A Yamaguchi	21	21	21
(Thailand) N Jindapol	18	23	17
Q4	(Denmark) J Finne-Ipsen	14	18
(Finland) A Mikkelä	21	21

Second Round
1	(Spain) C Marín	19	21	21
Q3	(South Korea) Kim N-y	21	15	19
7	(China) Sun Y	21	21
(Denmark) M Poulsen	7	13
3	(Japan) N Okuhara	13	21	21
(Japan) M Mitani	21	6	14
8	(Japan) A Yamaguchi	21	21
(Finland) A Mikkelä	15	14

Quarterfinals
1	(Spain) C Marín	21	16	27
7	(China) Sun Y	19	21	25
3	(Japan) N Okuhara	13	14
8	(Japan) A Yamaguchi	21	21

Semifinals
1	(Spain) C Marín	15	21	18
8	(Japan) A Yamaguchi	21	19	21

=== Bottom half ===
First Round
(Chinese Taipei) Hsu Y-c	12	5
(Thailand) P Buranaprasertsuk	21	21
(Bulgaria) L Zetchiri	16	11
5	(Chinese Taipei) Tai T-y	21	21
(Denmark) L Kjærsfeldt	11	16
(United States) Zhang BW	21	21
(Singapore) Liang XY	11	15
4	(South Korea) Sung J-h	21	21
(Japan) S Sato	20	21	21
(Denmark) N K Rohde	22	16	13
(China) He BJ	14	19
6	(India) P. V. Sindhu	21	21
PFQ	(Russia) K Polikarpova	7	14
(Thailand) B Ongbamrungphan	21	21
(Hong Kong) Cheung N Y	21	21
PFQ	(Chinese Taipei) Chiang M-h	9	10

Second Round
(Thailand) P Buranaprasertsuk	10	18
5	(Chinese Taipei) Tai T-y	21	21
(United States) Zhang BW	15	13
4	(South Korea) Sung J-h	21	21
(Japan) S Sato	21	21	21
6	(India) P. V. Sindhu	13	23	18
(Thailand) B Ongbamrungphan	16	10
(Hong Kong) Cheung N Y	21	21

Quarterfinals
5	(Chinese Taipei) Tai T-y	12	25	23
4	(South Korea) Sung J-h	21	23	21
(Japan) S Sato	19	12
(Hong Kong) Cheung N Y	21	21

Semifinals
5	(Chinese Taipei) Tai T-y	21	20	21
(Hong Kong) Cheung N Y	13	22	18

=== Finals ===
Semifinals
1	(Spain) C Marín	15	21	18
8	(Japan) A Yamaguchi	21	19	21
5	(Chinese Taipei) Tai T-y	21	20	21
(Hong Kong) Cheung N Y	13	22	18

Final
8	(Japan) A Yamaguchi	19	21	21
5	(Chinese Taipei) Tai T-y	21	14	12

== Men's doubles ==
=== Seeds ===
1. (China) Chai Biao / Hong Wei (first round)
2. (Denmark) Mathias Boe / Carsten Mogensen (semifinal)
3. (Denmark) Mads Conrad-Petersen / Mads Pieler Kolding (first round)
4. (Malaysia) Goh V Shem / Tan Wee Kiong (Champions)
5. (Indonesia) Markus Fernaldi Gideon / Kevin Sanjaya Sukamuljo (quarterfinal)
6. (Russia) Vladimir Ivanov / Ivan Sozonov (quarterfinal)
7. (Indonesia) Angga Pratama / Ricky Karanda Suwardi (semifinal)
8. (China) Li Junhui / Liu Yuchen (quarterfinal)

=== Top half ===
First Round
1	(China) Chai B (China) Hong W	1^{r}
(Denmark) M Christiansen (Denmark) D Daugaard	2
Q1	(Denmark) K Antonsen (Denmark) F Søgaard	13	12
(Thailand) B Issara (Thailand) N Puangpuapech	21	21
5	(Indonesia) M F Gideon (Indonesia) K S Sukamuljo	21	21
(Malaysia) Koo K K (Malaysia) Tan B H	11	18
(Germany) R Beck (Germany) P Kaesbauer	1^{r}
(Thailand) D Puavaranukroh (Thailand) K Kedren	4
3	(Denmark) M Conrad-Petersen (Denmark) M P Kolding	18	14
(Japan) T Kamura (Japan) K Sonoda	21	21
(Germany) J R Jansen (Germany) J Zurwonne	21	9	17
(Indonesia) R A Saputro (Indonesia) H Setiawan	17	21	21
7	(Indonesia) A Pratama (Indonesia) R K Suwardi	21	21
(Chinese Taipei) Lee J-h (Chinese Taipei) Lee Y	16	9
(Indonesia) M Ahsan (Indonesia) B Angriawan	21	12
(South Korea) Choi S-g (South Korea) Kim G-j	23	21

Second Round
(Denmark) M Christiansen (Denmark) D Daugaard	10	12
(Thailand) B Issara (Thailand) N Puangpuapech	21	21
5	(Indonesia) M F Gideon (Indonesia) K S Sukamuljo	21	21
(Thailand) D Puavaranukroh (Thailand) K Kedren	17	11
(Japan) T Kamura (Japan) K Sonoda	17	21	21
(Indonesia) R A Saputro (Indonesia) H Setiawan	21	17	12
7	(Indonesia) A Pratama (Indonesia) R K Suwardi	21	16	21
(South Korea) Choi S-g (South Korea) Kim G-j	7	21	8

Quarterfinals
(Thailand) B Issara (Thailand) N Puangpuapech	21	12	21
5	(Indonesia) M F Gideon (Indonesia) K S Sukamuljo	16	21	19
(Japan) T Kamura (Japan) K Sonoda	19	7
7	(Indonesia) A Pratama (Indonesia) R K Suwardi	21	21

Semifinals
(Thailand) B Issara (Thailand) N Puangpuapech	21	21
7	(Indonesia) A Pratama (Indonesia) R K Suwardi	11	18

=== Bottom half ===
First Round
(India) M Attri (India) B. S Reddy	10	19
(Denmark) K Astrup (Denmark) A S Rasmussen	21	21
PFQ	(Belgium) M Dierickx (Belgium) F Golinski	15	17
8	(China) Li JH (China) Liu YC	21	21
Q4	(Germany) M Lamsfuss (Germany) M E Seidel	19	18
(England) M Ellis (England) C Langridge	21	21
(China) Liu C (China) Zhang N	18	21	18
4	(Malaysia) Goh V S (Malaysia) Tan W K	21	18	21
Q2	(England) B Lane (England) S Vendy	15	10
(Japan) T Hoki (Japan) Y Kobayashi	21	21
(China) Huang KX (China) Wang YL	19	21	22
6	(Russia) V Ivanov (Russia) I Sozonov	21	16	24
(China) Fu HF (China) Xu C	21	17	21
Q3	(Denmark) F Colberg (Denmark) R Fladberg	19	21	15
(Chinese Taipei) Chen H-l (Chinese Taipei) Wang C-l	14	21	20
2	(Denmark) M Boe (Denmark) C Mogensen	21	19	22

Second Round
(Denmark) K Astrup (Denmark) A S Rasmussen	19	12
8	(China) Li JH (China) Liu YC	21	21
(England) M Ellis (England) C Langridge	18	17
4	(Malaysia) Goh V S (Malaysia) Tan W K	21	21
(Japan) T Hoki (Japan) Y Kobayashi	10	21	17
6	(Russia) V Ivanov (Russia) I Sozonov	21	18	21
(China) Fu HF (China) Xu C	10	19
2	(Denmark) M Boe (Denmark) C Mogensen	21	21

Quarterfinals
8	(China) Li JH (China) Liu YC	18	23
4	(Malaysia) Goh V S (Malaysia) Tan W K	21	25
6	(Russia) V Ivanov (Russia) I Sozonov	14	5
2	(Denmark) M Boe (Denmark) C Mogensen	21	21

Semifinals
4	(Malaysia) Goh V S (Malaysia) Tan W K	20	21	21
2	(Denmark) M Boe (Denmark) C Mogensen	22	15	11

=== Finals ===
Semifinals
(Thailand) B Issara (Thailand) N Puangpuapech	21	21
7	(Indonesia) A Pratama (Indonesia) R K Suwardi	11	18
4	(Malaysia) Goh V S (Malaysia) Tan W K	20	21	21
2	(Denmark) M Boe (Denmark) C Mogensen	22	15	11

Final
(Thailand) B Issara (Thailand) N Puangpuapech	21	20	19
4	(Malaysia) Goh V S (Malaysia) Tan W K	14	22	21

== Women's doubles ==
=== Seeds ===
1. (Japan) Misaki Matsutomo / Ayaka Takahashi (Champions)
2. (South Korea) Jung Kyung-eun / Shin Seung-chan (final)
3. (Indonesia) Nitya Krishinda Maheswari / Greysia Polii (semifinal)
4. (China) Luo Ying / Luo Yu (quarterfinal)
5. (Denmark) Christinna Pedersen / Kamilla Rytter Juhl (quarterfinal)
6. (South Korea) Chang Ye-na / Lee So-hee (second round)
7. (Japan) Naoko Fukuman / Kurumi Yonao (quarterfinal)
8. (Netherlands) Eefje Muskens / Selena Piek (withdrew)

=== Top half ===
First Round
1	(Japan) M Matsutomo (Japan) A Takahashi	21	21
(Australia) S Mapasa (Australia) G Somerville	12	16
(Thailand) J Kititharakul (Thailand) R Prajongjai	21	21
Q4	(Germany) I Herttrich (Germany) C Nelte	18	14
7	(Japan) N Fukuman (Japan) K Yonao	21	21
PFQ	(Chinese Taipei) Chiang K-h (Chinese Taipei) Hung S-H	19	6
(Sweden) C Nistad (Sweden) E Wengberg	9	12
(China) Ma J (China) Zhong QX	21	21
4	(China) Luo Y (China) Luo Y	21	21
(Denmark) J Finne-Ipsen (Denmark) R S Hansen	18	6
(Indonesia) A S Awanda (Indonesia) N K Mahadewi Istirani	21	21
Q3	(Denmark) L Noergaard (Denmark) N Vestergaard	12	7
6	(South Korea) Chang Y-n (South Korea) Lee S-h	21	18	21
(China) Huang DP (China) Li YH	16	21	13
(Thailand) P Supajirakul (Thailand) S Taerattanachai	21	21
(England) H Olver (England) J Pugh	14	13

Second Round
1	(Japan) M Matsutomo (Japan) A Takahashi	21	21
(Thailand) J Kititharakul (Thailand) R Prajongjai	17	11
7	(Japan) N Fukuman (Japan) K Yonao	21	21
(China) Ma J (China) Zhong QX	18	16
4	(China) Luo Y (China) Luo Y	21	21
(Indonesia) A S Awanda (Indonesia) N K Mahadewi Istirani	9	16
6	(South Korea) Chang Y-n (South Korea) Lee S-h	18	20
(Thailand) P Supajirakul (Thailand) S Taerattanachai	21	22

Quarterfinals
1	(Japan) M Matsutomo (Japan) A Takahashi	24	21
7	(Japan) N Fukuman (Japan) K Yonao	22	15
4	(China) Luo Y (China) Luo Y	16	18
(Thailand) P Supajirakul (Thailand) S Taerattanachai	21	21

Semifinals
1	(Japan) M Matsutomo (Japan) A Takahashi	21	21
(Thailand) P Supajirakul (Thailand) S Taerattanachai	17	11

=== Bottom half ===
First Round
(Bulgaria) G Stoeva (Bulgaria) S Stoeva	21	12	21
(Indonesia) D D Haris (Indonesia) R E Putri Sari	13	21	19
(Malaysia) Vivian Hoo K M (Malaysia) Woon K W	6	21	21
PFQ	(South Korea) Kim H-r (South Korea) Won Y-h	21	19	16
Q1	(Denmark) J D Jakobsen (Denmark) D Søby	10	14
(Denmark) M Fruergaard (Denmark) S Thygesen	21	21
PFQ	(Chinese Taipei) Chiang M-h (Chinese Taipei) Hsu Y-c	13	8
3	(Indonesia) N K Maheswari (Indonesia) G Polii	21	21
(Denmark) G Boje (Denmark) C Sentow	9	19
(Switzerland) N Fankhauser (Malaysia) S Saniru	21	21
(Germany) J Goliszewski (Germany) L Kaepplein	7	9
5	(Denmark) C Pedersen (Denmark) K Rytter Juhl	21	21
(South Korea) Chae Y-j (South Korea) Kim S-y	21	21
Q2	(Denmark) L Fleischer (Denmark) C Paredes	12	7
(China) Chen QC (China) Jia YF	22	16	11
2	(South Korea) Jung K-e (South Korea) Shin S-c	20	21	21

Second Round
(Bulgaria) G Stoeva (Bulgaria) S Stoeva	21	21
(Malaysia) Vivian Hoo K M (Malaysia) Woon K W	13	19
(Denmark) M Fruergaard (Denmark) D Søby	13	10
3	(Indonesia) N K Maheswari (Indonesia) G Polii	21	21
(Switzerland) N Fankhauser (Malaysia) S Saniru	15	3
5	(Denmark) C Pedersen (Denmark) K Rytter Juhl	21	21
(South Korea) Chae Y-j (South Korea) Kim S-y	8	17
2	(South Korea) Jung K-e (South Korea) Shin S-c	21	21

Quarterfinals
(Bulgaria) G Stoeva (Bulgaria) S Stoeva	20	15
3	(Indonesia) N K Maheswari (Indonesia) G Polii	22	21
5	(Denmark) C Pedersen (Denmark) K Rytter Juhl	18	17
2	(South Korea) Jung K-e (South Korea) Shin S-c	21	21

Semifinals
3	(Indonesia) N K Maheswari (Indonesia) G Polii	13	24
2	(South Korea) Jung K-e (South Korea) Shin S-c	21	26

=== Finals ===
Semifinals
1	(Japan) M Matsutomo (Japan) A Takahashi	21	21
(Thailand) P Supajirakul (Thailand) S Taerattanachai	17	11
3	(Indonesia) N K Maheswari (Indonesia) G Polii	13	24
2	(South Korea) Jung K-e (South Korea) Shin S-c	21	26

Final
1	(Japan) M Matsutomo (Japan) A Takahashi	19	21	21
2	(South Korea) Jung K-e (South Korea) Shin S-c	21	11	16

== Mixed doubles ==
=== Seeds ===
1. (South Korea) Ko Sung-hyun / Kim Ha-na (quarterfinal)
2. (Indonesia) Tontowi Ahmad / Liliyana Natsir (second round)
3. (Indonesia) Praveen Jordan / Debby Susanto (quarterfinal)
4. (England) Chris Adcock / Gabrielle Adcock (semifinal)
5. (Denmark) Joachim Fischer Nielsen / Christinna Pedersen (Champion)
6. (Malaysia) Chan Peng Soon / Goh Liu Ying (first round)
7. (China) Lu Kai / Huang Yaqiong (semifinal)
8. (China) Zheng Siwei / Chen Qingchen (final)

=== Top half ===
First Round
1	(South Korea) Ko S-h (South Korea) Kim H-n	21	21
(Indonesia) R Alexander (Indonesia) M D Oktavianti	19	17
PFQ	(Denmark) K Astrup (Denmark) L Kjaersfeldt	23	21
(Germany) M Lamsfuss (Germany) I Herttrich	21	17
5	(Denmark) J Fischer Nielsen (Denmark) C Pedersen	21	21
(India) P J Chopra (India) N S Reddy	15	14
(Thailand) B Issara (Thailand) S Amitrapai	21	21
(Japan) K Kazuno (Japan) A Kurihara	19	15
4	(England) C Adcock (England) G Adcock	21	10	21
(Poland) R Mateusiak (Poland) N Zieba	14	21	12
Q2	(Denmark) S Gravholt (Denmark) M Fruergaard	15	16
(Denmark) M Christiansen (Denmark) S Thygesen	21	21
6	(Malaysia) Chan P S (Malaysia) Goh L Y	17	5^{r}
(China) Li JH (China) Bao YX	21	4
Q1	(New Zealand) O L-Davis (Australia) G Somerville	21	9
(Malaysia) Tan K M (Malaysia) Lai P J	23	21

Second Round
1	(South Korea) Ko S-h (South Korea) Kim H-n	21	21
PFQ	(Denmark) K Astrup (Denmark) L Kjaersfeldt	14	17
5	(Denmark) J Fischer Nielsen (Denmark) C Pedersen	18	21	21
(Thailand) B Issara (Thailand) S Amitrapai	21	11	17
4	(England) C Adcock (England) G Adcock	21	21
(Denmark) M Christiansen (Denmark) S Thygesen	15	17
(China) Li JH (China) Bao YX	21	21
(Malaysia) Tan K M (Malaysia) Lai P J	16	16

Quarterfinals
1	(South Korea) Ko S-h (South Korea) Kim H-n	13	18
5	(Denmark) J Fischer Nielsen (Denmark) C Pedersen	21	21
4	(England) C Adcock (England) G Adcock	21	21
(China) Li JH (China) Bao YX	18	12

Semifinals
5	(Denmark) J Fischer Nielsen (Denmark) C Pedersen	21	21
4	(England) C Adcock (England) G Adcock	16	18

=== Bottom half ===
First Round
Q3	(Denmark) M B-Smidt (Denmark) A Boje	15	13
(Hong Kong) Lee C H (Hong Kong) Chau H W	21	21
(England) M Nottingham (England) E Westwood	21	14	13
8	(China) Zheng SW (China) Chen QC	17	21	21
Q4	(Thailand) N Phuangphuapet (Thailand) J Kititharakul	17	15
(Thailand) D Puavaranukroh (Thailand) S Taerattanachai	21	21
(Sweden) N Ruponen (Sweden) A Hogstrom	14	19
3	(Indonesia) P Jordan (Indonesia) D Susanto	21	21
PFQ	(Germany) M E Seidel (Germany) L Efler	15	19
(South Korea) Kim D-y (South Korea) Yoo H-w	21	21
(South Korea) Kim G-j (South Korea) Shin S-c	21	14	14
7	(China) Lu K (China) Huang YQ	19	21	21
PFQ	(England) B Lane (England) J Pugh	15	15
(China) Wang YL (China) Huang DP	21	21
(China) Huang KX (China) Li YH	12	11
2	(Indonesia) T Ahmad (Indonesia) L Natsir	21	21

Second Round
(Hong Kong) Lee C H (Hong Kong) Chau H W	21	10	9
8	(China) Zheng SW (China) Chen QC	19	21	21
(Thailand) D Puavaranukroh (Thailand) S Taerattanachai	18	19
3	(Indonesia) P Jordan (Indonesia) D Susanto	21	21
(South Korea) Kim D-y (South Korea) Yoo H-w	10	13
7	(China) Lu K (China) Huang YQ	21	21
(China) Wang YL (China) Huang DP	21	19	21
2	(Indonesia) T Ahmad (Indonesia) L Natsir	18	21	17

Quarterfinals
8	(China) Zheng SW (China) Chen QC	21	15	21
3	(Indonesia) P Jordan (Indonesia) D Susanto	19	21	14
7	(China) Lu K (China) Huang YQ	28	21
(China) Wang YL (China) Huang DP	26	16

Semifinals
8	(China) Zheng SW (China) Chen QC	21	22
7	(China) Lu K (China) Huang YQ	19	20

=== Finals ===
Semifinals
5	(Denmark) J Fischer Nielsen (Denmark) C Pedersen	21	21
4	(England) C Adcock (England) G Adcock	16	18
8	(China) Zheng SW (China) Chen QC	21	22
7	(China) Lu K (China) Huang YQ	19	20

Final
5	(Denmark) J Fischer Nielsen (Denmark) C Pedersen	21	22
8	(China) Zheng SW (China) Chen QC	16	20

Preceded by 2015 Denmark Super Series Premier	Denmark Open	Succeeded by 2017 Denmark Super Series Premier
Preceded by 2016 Korea Open Super Series	BWF Super Series; 2016 BWF Season	Succeeded by 2016 French Super Series
