= Sony Dwi Kuncoro =

Indonesian badminton player (born 1984)

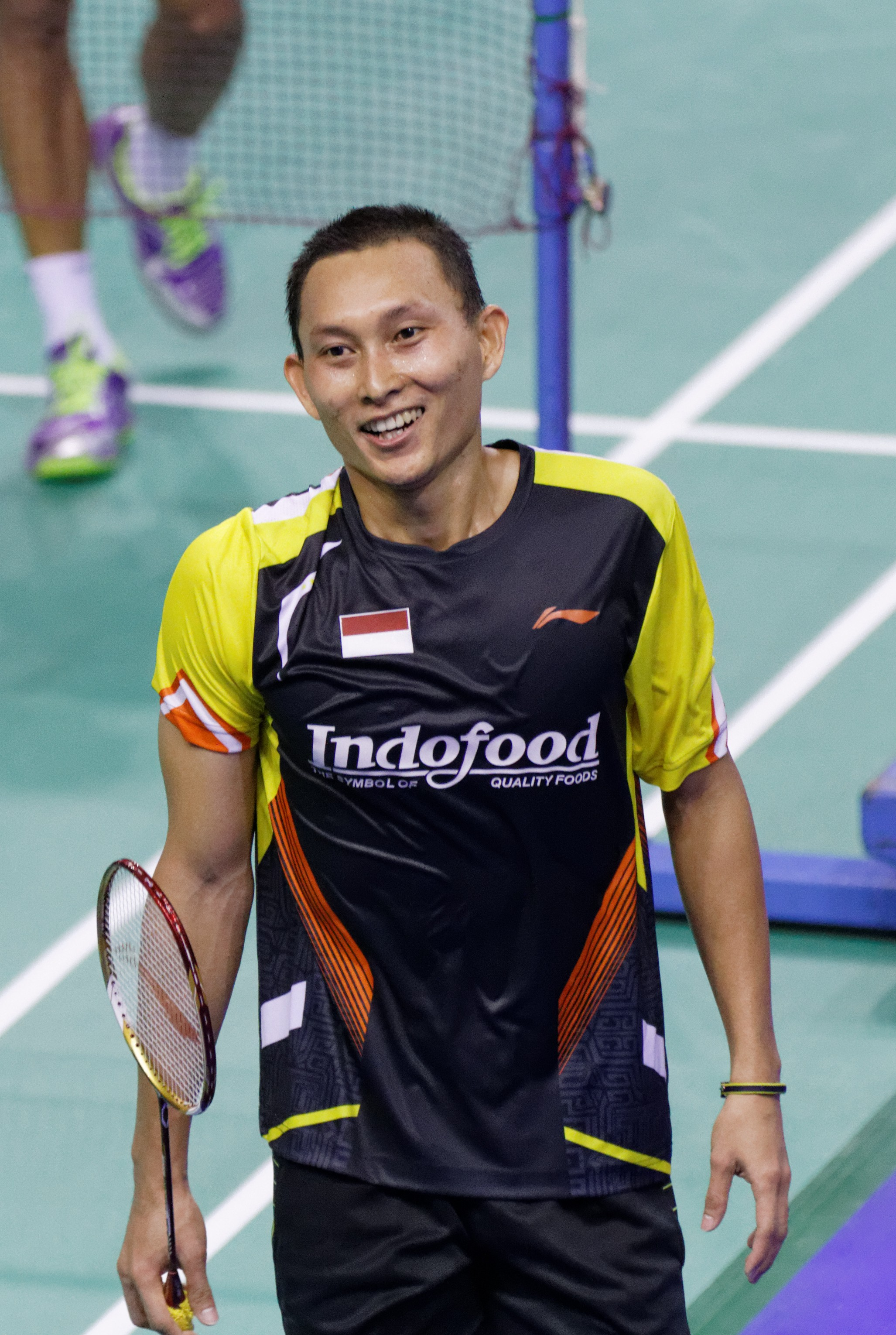
- Kuncoro at the 2013 French Open Superseries

Personal information
- Born: 7 July 1984 (age 42) Surabaya, East Java, Indonesia
- Height: 1.74 m (5 ft 9 in)
- Spouse: Gading Safitri (m. 2009)

Sport
- Country: Indonesia
- Sport: Badminton
- Handedness: Right

Men's singles
- Highest ranking: 3 (7 October 2004)
- BWF profile
Medal record
Men's badminton
Representing Indonesia
Olympic Games
Bronze medal – third place	2004 Athens	Men's singles
World Championships
Silver medal – second place	2007 Kuala Lumpur	Men's singles
Bronze medal – third place	2009 Hyderabad	Men's singles
Sudirman Cup
Silver medal – second place	2005 Beijing	Mixed team
Silver medal – second place	2007 Glasgow	Mixed team
Bronze medal – third place	2003 Eindhoven	Mixed team
Bronze medal – third place	2009 Guangzhou	Mixed team
Thomas Cup
Silver medal – second place	2010 Kuala Lumpur	Men's team
Bronze medal – third place	2004 Jakarta	Men's team
Bronze medal – third place	2006 Sendai & Tokyo	Men's team
Bronze medal – third place	2008 Jakarta	Men's team
Asian Games
Bronze medal – third place	2006 Doha	Men's team
Bronze medal – third place	2010 Guangzhou	Men's team
Asian Championships
Gold medal – first place	2002 Bangkok	Men's singles
Gold medal – first place	2003 Jakarta	Men's singles
Gold medal – first place	2005 Hyderabad	Men's singles
Silver medal – second place	2004 Kuala Lumpur	Men's singles
Bronze medal – third place	2008 Johor Bahru	Men's singles
SEA Games
Gold medal – first place	2003 Vietnam	Men's singles
Gold medal – first place	2003 Vietnam	Men's team
Gold medal – first place	2005 Manila	Men's singles
Gold medal – first place	2007 Nakhon Ratchasima	Men's team
Gold medal – first place	2009 Vientiane	Men's team
Silver medal – second place	2005 Manila	Men's team
Silver medal – second place	2009 Vientiane	Men's singles
World Junior Championships
Silver medal – second place	2000 Guangzhou	Boys' singles
Bronze medal – third place	2000 Guangzhou	Mixed team
Asian Junior Championships
Silver medal – second place	2000 Kyoto	Boys' singles
Silver medal – second place	2000 Kyoto	Boys' team
Silver medal – second place	2001 Taipei	Boys' singles
Bronze medal – third place	2001 Taipei	Boys' team

Sony Dwi Kuncoro (born 7 July 1984) is an Indonesian former badminton player. He was the 2004 Olympic bronze medalist, two-time World Championships medalist (silver–2007, bronze–2009) and three-time Asian Champion (2002, 2003, 2005). He reached a career high as world number 3 on 7 October 2004.

== Personal life ==
He plays badminton after his father introduced him at 7 years old, and at 8 years old he joined the Suryanaga Surabaya Badminton Club. Currently, he joins the Tjakrindo Masters Badminton Club in Surabaya. His parents are Moch. Sumadji (father) and Asmiati (mother). His hobbies are fixing automobiles and hanging-out or travelling. Generally people call him Sony, which can also be spelled as Soni. On 24 July 2009, he married Gading Safitri, who became his coach and manager.

== Career ==
=== 2004 Summer Olympics ===
Kuncoro played badminton at the 2004 Summer Olympics in men's singles, defeating Roslin Hashim of Malaysia and Jim Ronny Andersen of Norway in the first two rounds. In the quarter-finals, Kuncoro defeated Park Tae-sang of South Korea 15–13, 15–4. Kuncoro advanced to the semifinals, in which he lost to Shon Seung-mo of Korea 15–6, 9–15, 15–9. He defeated Boonsak Ponsana of Thailand by a score of 15–11, 17–16 in the bronze medal match.

=== 2007 BWF World Championships ===
He became runner-up at the 2007 IBF World Championships after losing to Lin Dan in straight sets with a score of 11–21, 20–22 in Putra Stadium, Bukit Jalil, Malaysia. During the tournament, he defeated Lee Chong Wei in the third round 21–9, 21–11 and Peter Gade in the quarter-final, 22–20, 21–18. He also beat Chen Yu in the semi-final in 3 tough games.

=== 2009 BWF World Championships ===
He was bronze medalist at the 2009 BWF World Championships, again losing to Lin Dan, but this time in 3 sets, 16–21, 21–14, 15–21. En route to the semi, he beat Lee Chong Wei (world number one) in the quarter-finals 21–16, 14–21, 21–12.

=== Other achievements ===
He was runner-up in the World Junior Championships in 2000, defeated by Bao Chunlai in the final. He had good results in the Asian Championships, winning three titles. On 23 September 2007, Kuncoro won the Chinese Taipei Open Grand Prix Gold after beating Taufik Hidayat in the final round 18–21, 21–6, 21–13. He won the men's singles gold medal at the SEA Games in 2003 and 2005. At the SEA Games in 2007 and 2009, Sony helped the Indonesian team win gold in the men's team event.

In 2008, Kuncoro competed in Beijing Olympic Games but he was eliminated in the quarter-finals to the second seeded Lee Chong Wei in straight games. In June, he won the Indonesia Open Superseries beating Simon Santoso in the final 19–21, 21–14, 21–9 in Istora Senayan, Jakarta. In September, Kuncoro won the Japan Open Superseries beating Lee Chong Wei from Malaysia in straight sets 21–17, 21–11 in the final. Also in September, he captured the China Masters Superseries by beating China's Chen Jin 21–19, 21–18 in the final, thus becoming the first player to win the men's singles at three consecutive "Superseries" tournaments.

In 2009, his best performance in Superseries was semi-finalists in the Indonesia Open, beaten by Taufik Hidayat, 17–21, 14–21 and in Denmark Open beaten by Marc Zwiebler of Germany in three tough games. In December, he again helped Indonesia win the SEA Games, beating Malaysia in the men teams final. He also finished second in the individual event, beaten by his teammate Simon Santoso.

In 2012, he won the men's singles title at the Thailand Open Grand Prix Gold defeating China's Chen Yuekun in straight games, 21–17, 21–14. In the semi-final, he beat the top seed from China, Lin Dan also in straight games, 21–17, 21–16.

In 2013, he started the year by becoming the semi-finalists in 2013 Korea Open Superseries Premier, beaten by Du Pengyu, 12–21 17–21 and in 2013 Indonesian Masters Grand Prix Gold, giving walkover to Dionysius Hayom Rumbaka. He became the finalist in 2013 Malaysia Open Superseries, beaten by Lee Chong Wei, 7–21 8–21 and in 2013 Hong Kong Open Superseries, again beaten by Lee Chong Wei, 13–21 9–21.

In 2015, his best performance was being the champion at 2015 Chinese Taipei Masters Grand Prix after beating Wang Tzu-wei of Chinese Taipei with score 21–13, 21–15. He also won the 2015 Indonesia International Challenge after defeat the Korean young blood Jeon Hyeok-jin with straight games 22–20, 21–15.

In 2016, he advanced to the main round of the 2016 Singapore Open Superseries after winning the qualification rounds. He later won the event after beating China's Lin Dan in the semi-final with score 21–10, 17–21, 22–20, then South Korea's Son Wan-ho in the final with 21–16, 13–21, 21–14. This is his first Superseries title win in six years since his victory at the same level on the stage of 2010 Singapore Open. He competed as an independent athlete and later was removed from the national training camp in mid-2014 because of injuries to his back, waist and wrist.

== Awards ==
Award	Year	Category	Result	Ref.
Government of Indonesia Awards	2021	Satyalancana Dharma Olahraga	Honored	

== Achievements ==
=== Olympic Games ===
Men's singles
Year	Venue	Opponent	Score	Result	Ref.
2004	Goudi Olympic Hall, Athens, Greece	(Thailand) Boonsak Ponsana	15–11, 17–16	Bronze	

=== BWF World Championships ===
Men's singles
Year	Venue	Opponent	Score	Result	Ref.
2007	Putra Indoor Stadium, Kuala Lumpur, Malaysia	(China) Lin Dan	11–21, 20–22	Silver	
2009	Gachibowli Indoor Stadium, Hyderabad, India	(China) Lin Dan	14–21, 21–13, 15–21	Bronze	

=== Asian Championships ===
Men's singles
Year	Venue	Opponent	Score	Result	Ref.
2002	Nimibutr Stadium, Bangkok, Thailand	(Indonesia) Taufik Hidayat	15–12, 15–5	Gold	
2003	Tennis Indoor Gelora Bung Karno, Jakarta, Indonesia	(Indonesia) Taufik Hidayat	15–5, 7–15, 15–8	Gold	
2004	Kuala Lumpur Badminton Stadium, Kuala Lumpur, Malaysia	(Indonesia) Taufik Hidayat	12–15, 15–7, 6–15	Silver	
2005	Gachibowli Indoor Stadium, Hyderabad, India	(Malaysia) Kuan Beng Hong	15–10, 15–5	Gold	
2008	Bandaraya Stadium, Johor Bahru, Malaysia	(South Korea) Park Sung-hwan	21–14, 16–21, 19–21	Bronze	

=== SEA Games ===
Men's singles
Year	Venue	Opponent	Score	Result	Ref.
2003	Tan Binh Sport Center, Ho Chi Minh City, Vietnam	(Malaysia) Wong Choong Hann	15–8, 15–5	Gold	
2005	PhilSports Arena, Pasig, Philippines	(Indonesia) Simon Santoso	17–16, 15–3	Gold	
2009	Gym Hall 1, National Sports Complex, Vientiane, Laos	(Indonesia) Simon Santoso	16–21, 12–21	Silver	

=== World Junior Championships ===
Boys' singles
Year	Venue	Opponent	Score	Result	Ref.
2000	Tianhe Gymnasium, Guangzhou, China	(China) Bao Chunlai	1–7, 5–7, 7–1, 5–7	Silver	

=== Asian Junior Championships ===
Boys' singles
Year	Venue	Opponent	Score	Result	Ref.
2000	Nishiyama Park Gymnasium, Kyoto, Japan	(China) Lin Dan	12–15, 5–15	Silver	
2001	Taipei Gymnasium, Taipei, Taiwan	(Indonesia) Ardiansyah	12–15, 12–15	Silver	

=== BWF Superseries (5 titles, 2 runners-up) ===
The BWF Superseries, which was launched on 14 December 2006 and implemented in 2007, is a series of elite badminton tournaments, sanctioned by the Badminton World Federation (BWF). BWF Superseries levels are Superseries and Superseries Premier. A season of Superseries consists of twelve tournaments around the world that have been introduced since 2011. Successful players are invited to the Superseries Finals, which are held at the end of each year.

Men's singles
Year	Tournament	Opponent	Score	Result	Ref.
2008	Indonesia Open	(Indonesia) Simon Santoso	19–21, 21–14, 21–9	(gold) Winner	
2008	Japan Open	(Malaysia) Lee Chong Wei	21–17, 21–11	(gold) Winner	
2008	China Masters	(China) Chen Jin	21–19, 21–18	(gold) Winner	
2010	Singapore Open	(Thailand) Boonsak Ponsana	21–16, 21–16	(gold) Winner	
2013	Malaysia Open	(Malaysia) Lee Chong Wei	7–21, 8–21	(silver) Runner-up	
2013	Hong Kong Open	(Malaysia) Lee Chong Wei	13–21, 9–21	(silver) Runner-up	
2016	Singapore Open	(South Korea) Son Wan-ho	21–16, 13–21, 21–14	(gold) Winner	

BWF Super Series Finals tournament
BWF Super Series Premier tournament
BWF Super Series tournament

=== BWF Grand Prix (4 titles, 3 runners-up) ===
The BWF Grand Prix had two levels, the BWF Grand Prix and Grand Prix Gold. It was a series of badminton tournaments sanctioned by the Badminton World Federation (BWF) which was held from 2007 to 2017. The World Badminton Grand Prix sanctioned by International Badminton Federation (IBF) from 1983 to 2006.

Men's singles
Year	Tournament	Opponent	Score	Result	Ref.
2003	Chinese Taipei Open	(Malaysia) Wong Choong Hann	15–3, 7–15, 4–15	(silver) Runner-up	
2007	Chinese Taipei Open	(Indonesia) Taufik Hidayat	18–21, 21–6, 21–13	(gold) Winner	
2012	Malaysia Grand Prix Gold	(Malaysia) Lee Chong Wei	21–17, 8–21, 10–21	(silver) Runner-up	
2012	Thailand Open	(China) Chen Yuekun	21–17, 21–14	(gold) Winner	
2012	Indonesia Grand Prix Gold	(Indonesia) Dionysius Hayom Rumbaka	21–11, 21–11	(gold) Winner	
2015	Chinese Taipei Masters	(Chinese Taipei) Wang Tzu-wei	21–13, 21–15	(gold) Winner	
2016	Thailand Open	(Thailand) Tanongsak Saensomboonsuk	15–21, 16–21	(silver) Runner-up	

BWF Grand Prix Gold tournament
BWF Grand Prix tournament

=== BWF International Challenge/Series (1 title, 3 runners-up) ===
Men's singles
Year	Tournament	Opponent	Score	Result	Ref.
2015	Indonesia International	(South Korea) Jeon Hyeok-jin	22–20, 21–15	(gold) Winner	
2018	Indonesia International	(Indonesia) Shesar Hiren Rhustavito	12–21, 20–22	(silver) Runner-up	
2018	Indonesia International	(Indonesia) Chico Aura Dwi Wardoyo	15–21, 9–21	(silver) Runner-up	
2019	Indonesia International	(Indonesia) Ikhsan Rumbay	13–21, 15–21	(silver) Runner-up	

BWF International Challenge tournament
BWF International Series tournament

== Participation at Indonesian team ==
- 4 times at Sudirman Cup (2003, 2005, 2007, 2009)
- 4 times at Thomas Cup (2004, 2006, 2008, 2010)
- 2 times at Asian Games (2006, 2010)
- 4 times at SEA Games (2003, 2005, 2007, 2009)

== Performance timeline ==
=== National team ===
- Junior level

Team events	2000	2001
Asian Junior Championships	Silver	Bronze
World Junior Championships	Bronze	—N/a

- Senior level

Team events	2002	2003	2004	2005	2006	2007	2008	2009	2010
SEA Games	—N/a	Gold	—N/a	Silver	—N/a	Gold	—N/a	Gold	—N/a
Asian Games	A	—N/a			Bronze	—N/a			Bronze
Thomas Cup	Gold	—N/a	Bronze	—N/a	Bronze	—N/a	Bronze	—N/a	Silver
Sudirman Cup	—N/a	Bronze	—N/a	Silver	—N/a	Silver	—N/a	Bronze	—N/a

=== Individual competitions ===
- Junior level

Events	2000	2001
Asian Junior Championships	Silver	Silver
World Junior Championships	Silver	—N/a

- Senior level

Events	2002	2003	2004	2005	2006	2007	2008	2009	2010	2011	2012	2013	2014	2015	2016	2017
SEA Games	—N/a	Gold	—N/a	Gold	—N/a	R1	—N/a	Silver	—N/a	A	—N/a	A	—N/a	A	—N/a	A
Asian Championships	Gold	Gold	Silver	Gold	QF	A	Bronze	A								
Asian Games	A	—N/a			A	—N/a			R1	—N/a			A	—N/a		
World Championships	DNQ	QF	—N/a	R3	R3	Silver	—N/a	Bronze	w/d	DNQ	—N/a	R1	DNQ		—N/a	R2
Olympic Games	—N/a		Bronze	—N/a			QF	—N/a			DNQ	—N/a			DNQ	—N/a

Tournament	2018	2019	Best
BWF World Tour
Malaysia Masters	Q2	A	F (2012)
Thailand Masters	A	R1	R2 (2016)
Indonesia Masters	QF	R1	W (2012)
Singapore Open	R1	Q1	W (2010, 2016)
New Zealand Open	R1	A	R1 (2018)
Australian Open	QF	A	QF (2018)
Thailand Open	SF	R1	W (2012)
Hyderabad Open	A	R2	R2 (2019)
Vietnam Open	A	R1	SF (2012)
Indonesia Masters Super 100	w/d	R3	R3 (2019)
Macau Open	R1	A	QF (2010, 2014)
Year-end ranking	63	146	3
Tournament	2018	2019	Best

Tournament	2007	2008	2009	2010	2011	2012	2013	2014	2015	2016	2017	Best
BWF Superseries
All England Open	QF	QF	R2	R2	R1	A	R2	R1	A		R2	QF (2007, 2008)
Swiss Open	QF	R1	A		GPG							SF (2003, 2004)
India Open	—N/a	GPG			R1	A	w/d	A		R2	A	R2 (2016)
Malaysia Open	R2	R1	QF	w/d	A		F	w/d	A	Q1	R1	F (2013)
Singapore Open	R2	A	QF	W	R1	QF	w/d	A		W	R1	W (2010, 2016)
Australian Open	IC/IS		GPG					A		R2	A	R2 (2012, 2016)
Indonesia Open	QF	W	SF	SF	Q1	QF	R2	R1	Q2	R2	Q1	W (2008)
Japan Open	R1	W	QF	w/d	Q1	R1	R1	A		R1	A	W (2008)
Korea Open	QF	QF	A				SF	A		R1	Q2	SF (2013)
China Masters	R2	W	A					GPG				W (2008)
Denmark Open	QF	R2	SF	A		QF	QF	A				SF (2009)
French Open	R1	R2	R2	A		R2	R2	A				R2 (2008, 2009, 2012, 2013)
China Open	QF	A	QF	A		R2	QF	A		R1	Q2	QF (2007, 2009, 2013)
Hong Kong Open	QF	A	R1	A		R1	F	R1	A	QF	Q1	F (2013)
BWF Superseries Finals	—N/a	SF	DNQ				GS	DNQ				SF (2008)
Year-end ranking			7	30	67	13	8	131	70	26	95	3
Tournament	2007	2008	2009	2010	2011	2012	2013	2014	2015	2016	2017	Best

Tournament	2007	2008	2009	2010	2011	2012	2013	2014	2015	2016	2017	Best
BWF Grand Prix and Grand Prix Gold
Malaysia Masters	—N/a		A		QF	F	w/d	A	R1	R2	R1	F (2012)
Syed Modi International	—N/a		A		R1	A	—N/a	A				R1 (2011)
Thailand Masters	—N/a									R2	w/d	R2 (2016)
German Open	A					R1	A					R1 (2012)
Swiss Open	SS				R1	R1	w/d	A	R1	A		SF (2003, 2004)
Australian Open	IC/IS		A			R2	A	SS				R2 (2012)
China Masters	SS							A	R2	A		W (2008)
Chinese Taipei Open	W	A		QF	SF	R1	A		R1	R1	A	W (2007)
Vietnam Open	A				R3	SF	A	w/d	A			SF (2012)
Thailand Open	w/d	A		—N/a	A	W	A	—N/a	QF	F	R1	W (2012)
Philippines Open	SF	—N/a	A	—N/a								SF (2007)
Chinese Taipei Masters	—N/a								W	A	—N/a	W (2015)
Korea Masters	IC			A	R2	A			R2	A		R2 (2011, 2015)
Macau Open	A			QF	R2	A		QF	A	w/d	A	QF (2010, 2014)
Indonesian Masters	—N/a			R2	R1	W	SF	R3	R3	R2	—N/a	W (2012)

Tournament	1998	1999	2000	2001	2002	2003	2004	2005	2006	Best
IBF World Grand Prix
All England Open	A				R1	R1	QF	A	R1	QF (2004)
Swiss Open	A				R2	SF	SF	A		SF (2003, 2004)
Indonesia Open	R2	R1	A	QF	QF	R3	QF	SF	R1	SF (2005)
Malaysia Open	A					QF	R3	R3	A	QF (2003)
Thailand Open	—N/a	A		R2	—N/a	A				R2 (2001)
Singapore Open	A		—N/a	R1	R2	A		R1	w/d	R2 (2002)
Chinese Taipei Open	—N/a	A		—N/a	A	F	A			F (2003)
Korea Open	—N/a	A				R3	w/d	A	R1	R3 (2003)
Hong Kong Open	A		—N/a	SF	—N/a	QF	—N/a	R2	QF	SF (2001)
Japan Open	A				R2	R1	R3	A	R2	R3 (2004)
China Open	—N/a	A	—N/a	A			R3	R3	A	R3 (2004, 2005)
Dutch Open	A				R3	A				R3 (2002)
Denmark Open	A				R3	R2	R3	A		R3 (2002, 2004)

== Record against selected opponents ==
Head to head (H2H) against BWF Superseries finalists, World Championships semifinalists, and Olympic quarterfinalists.

- (China) Bao Chunlai 3–9
- (China) Chen Hong 4–3
- (China) Chen Jin 2–3
- (China) Chen Long 1–1
- (China) Chen Yu 2–1
- (China) Du Pengyu 3–2
- (China) Lin Dan 3–9
- (China) Tian Houwei 1–0
- (China) Xia Xuanze 1–0
- (Chinese Taipei) Chou Tien-chen 0–2
- (Denmark) Hans-Kristian Vittinghus 0–1
- (Denmark) Jan Ø. Jørgensen 0–2
- (Denmark) Peter Gade 3–1
- (Denmark) Peter Rasmussen 0–2
- (Denmark) Viktor Axelsen 0–2
- (Indonesia) Taufik Hidayat 2–3
- (Indonesia) Tommy Sugiarto 3–2
- (India) Parupalli Kashyap 3–0
- (Japan) Sho Sasaki 5–1
- (South Korea) Lee Hyun-il 1–4
- (South Korea) Park Sung-hwan 2–6
- (South Korea) Shon Seung-mo 3–2
- (South Korea) Son Wan-ho 2–1
- (Malaysia) Lee Chong Wei 5–10
- (Malaysia) Wong Choong Hann 6–4
- (Singapore) Ronald Susilo 3–2
- (Thailand) Kunlavut Vitidsarn 1–1
- (Thailand) Boonsak Ponsana 5–4
- (Vietnam) Nguyễn Tiến Minh 2–2
