= 2011 Chinese Taipei Open Grand Prix Gold =

Tournament details
- Dates: September 6, 2011 - September 11, 2011
- Total prize money: US$200,000
- Venue: Taipei County Shinjuang Stadium
- Location: Taipei, Taiwan

The 2011 Chinese Taipei Open Grand Prix Gold was the tenth grand prix gold and grand prix badminton tournament of the 2011 BWF Grand Prix Gold and Grand Prix. The tournament was held in Hsing Chuang Gymnasium, Taipei, Taiwan from 3 to 8 September 2013 and had a total purse of $200,000.

== Men's singles ==
=== Seeds ===
1. (Vietnam) Nguyễn Tiến Minh
2. (South Korea) Park Sung-hwan
3. (South Korea) Lee Hyun-il
4. (Hong Kong) Hu Yun
5. (Indonesia) Simon Santoso
6. (Indonesia) Tommy Sugiarto
7. (Hong Kong) Wong Wing Ki
8. (Indonesia) Dionysius Hayom Rumbaka
9. (South Korea) Son Wan-ho
10. (India) Ajay Jayaram
11. (Indonesia) Alamsyah Yunus
12. (Hong Kong) Chan Yan Kit
13. (Netherlands) Dicky Palyama
14. (Chinese Taipei) Hsu Jen-hao
15. (Thailand) Tanongsak Saensomboonsuk
16. (India) Anand Pawar

=== Finals ===
Quarterfinals
1	(Vietnam) Nguyễn Tiến Minh	18	21	21
9	(South Korea) Son Wan-ho	21	15	11
15	(Thailand) Tanongsak Saensomboonsuk	21	21
(Hong Kong) Wei Nan	15	19
(Malaysia) Muhammad Hafiz Hashim	21	14	14
(Indonesia) Sony Dwi Kuncoro	15	21	21
6	(Indonesia) Tommy Sugiarto	21	21
(Malaysia) Chong Wei Feng	15	13

Semifinals
1	(Vietnam) Nguyễn Tiến Minh	18	12
15	(Thailand) Tanongsak Saensomboonsuk	21	21
(Indonesia) Sony Dwi Kuncoro	20	24	13
6	(Indonesia) Tommy Sugiarto	22	22	21

Final
15	(Thailand) Tanongsak Saensomboonsuk	15	21	17
6	(Indonesia) Tommy Sugiarto	21	15	21

=== Top half ===
==== Section 1 ====
First Round
1	(Vietnam) Nguyễn Tiến Minh	21	21
(Malaysia) Kong Keat Zhen	10	11
(Chinese Taipei) Wu Tsai-hsin	10	13
(Malaysia) Goh Soon Huat	21	21
12	(Hong Kong) Chan Yan Kit	21	21
(Malaysia) Ong Jing Khai	11	7
(Chinese Taipei) Hsueh Hsuan-yi	21	21
(Malaysia) Kuan Beng Hong	13	16

Second Round
1	(Vietnam) Nguyễn Tiến Minh	21	21
(Malaysia) Goh Soon Huat	10	13
12	(Hong Kong) Chan Yan Kit	17	11
(Chinese Taipei) Hsueh Hsuan-yi	21	21

Third Round
1	(Vietnam) Nguyễn Tiến Minh	19	21	21
(Chinese Taipei) Hsueh Hsuan-yi	21	13	9

==== Section 2 ====
First Round
5	(Indonesia) Simon Santoso	21	21
(Hong Kong) Chan Yun Lung	18	18
(Indonesia) Shesar Hiren Rhustavito	21	21
(Malaysia) Jiann Shiarng Chiang	12	19
9	(South Korea) Son Wan-ho	21	22
(Chinese Taipei) Teng Shih-hua	16	20
(Malaysia) Chan Kwong Beng	15	21	21
(Chinese Taipei) Wang Tzu-wei	21	9	5

Second Round
5	(Indonesia) Simon Santoso	21	21
(Indonesia) Shesar Hiren Rhustavito	12	13
9	(South Korea) Son Wan-ho	21	21
(Malaysia) Chan Kwong Beng	10	11

Third Round
5	(Indonesia) Simon Santoso	18	21	23
9	(South Korea) Son Wan-ho	21	18	25

==== Section 3 ====
First Round
3	(South Korea) Lee Hyun-il	21	21
(Macau) Lei Io Meng	6	6
(Chinese Taipei) Shih Kuei-chun	21	16
(Malaysia) Liew Daren	23	21
15	(Thailand) Tanongsak Saensomboonsuk	21	21
(Hong Kong) Tam Chun Hei	16	13
(United States) Hock Lai Lee	21	21
(Malaysia) Weng Jun Saw	7	11

Second Round
3	(South Korea) Lee Hyun-il	17	21	12
(Malaysia) Liew Daren	21	16	21
15	(Thailand) Tanongsak Saensomboonsuk	21	21
(United States) Hock Lai Lee	19	18

Third Round
(Malaysia) Liew Daren	17	16
15	(Thailand) Tanongsak Saensomboonsuk	21	21

==== Section 4 ====
First Round
7	(Hong Kong) Wong Wing Ki	21	17	21
(Malaysia) Lok Chong Chieh	9	21	10
(Canada) Timothy Chiu	10	12
(Chinese Taipei) Liao Sheng-shiun	21	21
WDN	(India) Ajay Jayaram
(Hong Kong) Wei Nan	W/O
(Malaysia) Mohamad Arif Abdul Latif	21	22
(Chinese Taipei) Yang Chih-hsun	15	20

Second Round
(Hong Kong) Wong Wing Ki	21	21
(Chinese Taipei) Liao Sheng-shiun	11	14
(Hong Kong) Wei Nan	21	21
(Malaysia) Mohamad Arif Abdul Latif	14	12

Third Round
7	(Hong Kong) Wong Wing Ki	18	22	14
(Hong Kong) Wei Nan	21	20	21

=== Bottom half ===
==== Section 5 ====
First Round
(Chinese Taipei) Yu Chih-wei	12	14
(Malaysia) Yogendran Khrishnan	21	21
(Chinese Taipei) Lu Chi-yuan	21	19	14
(Netherlands) Dicky Palyama	13	21	21
(Chinese Taipei) Chou Tien-chen	21	11	21
(Malaysia) Iskandar Zulkarnain Zainuddin	7	21	11
(Malaysia) Muhammad Hafiz Hashim	21	21
8	(Indonesia) Dionysius Hayom Rumbaka	15	15

Second Round
(Malaysia) Yogendran Khrishnan	19	21	14
(Netherlands) Dicky Palyama	21	8	21
(Chinese Taipei) Chou Tien-chen	22	10	16
(Malaysia) Muhammad Hafiz Hashim	20	21	21

Third Round
(Netherlands) Dicky Palyama	15	21	6
(Malaysia) Muhammad Hafiz Hashim	21	16	21

==== Section 6 ====
First Round
(Malaysia) Misbun Ramdan Misbun	22	17
(Thailand) Pisit Poodchalat	24	21
(Chinese Taipei) Lin Yu-jui	9	18
11	(Indonesia) Alamsyah Yunus	21	21
(Indonesia) Sony Dwi Kuncoro	21	21
(Chinese Taipei) Lin Chia-hsuan	9	11
(Chinese Taipei) Tsai Meng-jui	17	23
4	(Hong Kong) Hu Yun	21	25

Second Round
(Thailand) Pisit Poodchalat	13	12
11	(Indonesia) Alamsyah Yunus	21	21
(Indonesia) Sony Dwi Kuncoro	21	21
4	(Hong Kong) Hu Yun	16	10

Third Round
11	(Indonesia) Alamsyah Yunus	21	20	17
(Indonesia) Sony Dwi Kuncoro	15	22	21

==== Section 7 ====
First Round
(Chinese Taipei) Chu Han-chou	21	21
(Malaysia) Beryno Wong	15	13
(Hong Kong) Ng Ka Long	14	10
14	(Chinese Taipei) Hsu Jen-hao	21	21
(United States) Sujay Karve	7	7
(Chinese Taipei) Feng Sheng-jie	21	21
(Chinese Taipei) Fu Pao Chang	13	5
6	(Indonesia) Tommy Sugiarto	21	21

Second Round
(Chinese Taipei) Chu Han-chou	18	7
14	(Chinese Taipei) Hsu Jen-hao	21	21
(Chinese Taipei) Feng Sheng-jie	10	11
6	(Indonesia) Tommy Sugiarto	21	21

Third Round
14	(Chinese Taipei) Hsu Jen-hao	9	19
6	(Indonesia) Tommy Sugiarto	21	21

==== Section 8 ====
First Round
(Malaysia) Woon Kok Hong	21	13	11
(Chinese Taipei) Lee Chen-yen	15	21	21
(United States) Agusriadi Wijaya Amphie	W/O
WDN	(India) Anand Pawar
(Chinese Taipei) Hsieh Feng-tse	18	20
(Malaysia) Chong Wei Feng	21	22
(Chinese Taipei) Yang Chih-chieh	W/O
WDN	(South Korea) Park Sung-hwan

Second Round
(Chinese Taipei) Lee Chen-yen	16	16
(United States) Agusriadi Wijaya Amphie	21	21
(Malaysia) Chong Wei Feng	21	21
(Chinese Taipei) Yang Chih-chieh	13	13

Third Round
(United States) Agusriadi Wijaya Amphie	8	12
(Malaysia) Chong Wei Feng	21	21

== Women's singles ==
=== Seeds ===
1. (Chinese Taipei) Cheng Shao-chieh
2. (South Korea) Bae Yeon-ju
3. (Thailand) Ratchanok Intanon
4. (South Korea) Sung Ji-hyun
5. (Hong Kong) Yip Pui Yin
6. (Chinese Taipei) Tai Tzu-ying
7. (Singapore) Gu Juan
8. (Indonesia) Lindaweni Fanetri

=== Finals ===
Semifinals
(Chinese Taipei) Pai Hsiao-ma	9	18
4	(South Korea) Sung Ji-hyun	21	21
3	(Thailand) Ratchanok Intanon	21	21
2	(South Korea) Bae Yeon-ju	10	13

Final
4	(South Korea) Sung Ji-hyun	22	21
3	(Thailand) Ratchanok Intanon	20	14

=== Top half ===
==== Section 1 ====
First Round
1	(Chinese Taipei) Cheng Shao-chieh	21	21
(India) Aditi Mutatkar	12	11
(Chinese Taipei) Pai Hsiao-ma	22	21
(Malaysia) Tee Jing Yi	20	13
5	(Hong Kong) Yip Pui Yin	21	21
PFQ	(Chinese Taipei) Pai Yu-po	14	12
(Singapore) Fu Mingtian	15	21	17
(Hong Kong) Chan Hung Yung	21	16	21

Second Round
1	(Chinese Taipei) Cheng Shao-chieh	13	17
(Chinese Taipei) Pai Hsiao-ma	21	21
5	(Hong Kong) Yip Pui Yin	18	21	21
(Hong Kong) Chan Hung Yung	21	13	18

Quarterfinals
(Chinese Taipei) Pai Hsiao-ma	21	22	21
5	(Hong Kong) Yip Pui Yin	13	24	17

==== Section 2 ====
First Round
4	(South Korea) Sung Ji-hyun	21	21
Q	(Hong Kong) Mong Kwan Yi	13	17
(United States) Iris Wang	10	12
(Indonesia) Maria Febe Kusumastuti	21	21
8	(Indonesia) Lindaweni Fanetri	21	17	23
Q	(Chinese Taipei) Hsu Ya-ching	11	21	21
(Chinese Taipei) Chen Hsiao-huan	21	13	19
(Hong Kong) Poon Lok Yan	12	21	21

Second Round
4	(South Korea) Sung Ji-hyun	21	21
(Indonesia) Maria Febe Kusumastuti	13	15
8	(Indonesia) Lindaweni Fanetri	21	17	22
(Hong Kong) Poon Lok Yan	10	21	20

Quarterfinals
4	(South Korea) Sung Ji-hyun	21	21
8	(Indonesia) Lindaweni Fanetri	17	19

=== Bottom half ===
==== Section 3 ====
First Round
(Slovenia) Maja Tvrdy	14	7
(Singapore) Xing Aiying	21	21
(Indonesia) Adriyanti Firdasari	14	17
6	(Chinese Taipei) Tai Tzu-ying	21	21
Q	(Chinese Taipei) Chiu Yi-ju	W/O
DNS	(India) P. C. Thulasi
(Malaysia) Lyddia Cheah	21	13	2^{r}
3	(Thailand) Ratchanok Intanon	19	21	10

Second Round
(Singapore) Xing Aiying	20	7
6	(Chinese Taipei) Tai Tzu-ying	22	21
Q	(Chinese Taipei) Chiu Yi-ju	14	9
3	(Thailand) Ratchanok Intanon	21	21

Quarterfinals
6	(Chinese Taipei) Tai Tzu-ying	19	19
3	(Thailand) Ratchanok Intanon	21	21

==== Section 4 ====
First Round
(South Korea) Kim Moon-hi	21	16	16
(Hong Kong) Tse Ying Suet	11	21	21
(United States) Rena Wang	13	11
(Singapore) Gu Juan	21	21
(Indonesia) Aprilia Yuswandari	19	18
Q	(Chinese Taipei) Hung Shih-han	21	21
(Hong Kong) Chan Tsz Ka	11	21	10
2	(South Korea) Bae Yeon-ju	21	15	21

Second Round
(Hong Kong) Tse Ying Suet	21	21
7	(Singapore) Gu Juan	11	12
Q	(Chinese Taipei) Hung Shih-han	19	11
2	(South Korea) Bae Yeon-ju	21	21

Quarterfinals
(Hong Kong) Tse Ying Suet	22	13	14
2	(South Korea) Bae Yeon-ju	20	21	21

== Men's doubles ==
=== Seeds ===
1. (South Korea) Jung Jae-sung / Lee Yong-dae
2. (South Korea) Ko Sung-hyun / Yoo Yeon-seong
3. (Indonesia) Markis Kido / Hendra Setiawan
4. (Indonesia) Alvent Yulianto Chandra / Hendra Aprida Gunawan
5. (Chinese Taipei) Fang Chieh-min / Lee Sheng-mu
6. (South Korea) Cho Gun-woo / Kwon Yi-goo
7. (Chinese Taipei) Chen Hung-ling / Lin Yu-lang
8. (Malaysia) Goh V Shem / Lim Khim Wah

=== Finals ===
Semifinals
1	(South Korea) Jung Jae-sung (South Korea) Lee Yong-dae	22	21
(South Korea) Kim Gi-jung (South Korea) Shin Baek-cheol	20	15
4	(Indonesia) Alvent Yulianto Chandra (Indonesia) Hendra Aprida Gunawan	16	16
2	(South Korea) Ko Sung-hyun (South Korea) Yoo Yeon-seong	21	21

Final
1	(South Korea) Jung Jae-sung (South Korea) Lee Yong-dae	21	17
2	(South Korea) Ko Sung-hyun (South Korea) Yoo Yeon-seong	23	21

=== Top half ===
==== Section 1 ====
First Round
1	(South Korea) Jung Jae-sung (South Korea) Lee Yong-dae	21	21
(Chinese Taipei) Huang Po-jui (Chinese Taipei) Lu Ching-yao	11	7
(Malaysia) Mak Hee Chun (Malaysia) Ong Soon Hock	21	21
(Chinese Taipei) Su Yi-neng (Chinese Taipei) Tseng Min-hao	18	16
6	(South Korea) Cho Gun-woo (South Korea) Kwon Yi-goo	21	10	21
(Indonesia) Yohanes Rendy Sugiarto (Indonesia) Afiat Yuris Wirawan	17	21	19
Q	(Chinese Taipei) Chen Chaug-sheg (Chinese Taipei) Lo Guan-chung	21	16	18
Q	(Chinese Taipei) Lin Chia-yu (Chinese Taipei) Wang Chia-min	16	21	21

Second Round
1	(South Korea) Jung Jae-sung (South Korea) Lee Yong-dae	21	21
(Malaysia) Mak Hee Chun (Malaysia) Ong Soon Hock	14	9
6	(South Korea) Cho Gun-woo (South Korea) Kwon Yi-goo	24	21
Q	(Chinese Taipei) Lin Chia-yu (Chinese Taipei) Wang Chia-min	22	17

Quarterfinals
1	(South Korea) Jung Jae-sung (South Korea) Lee Yong-dae	21	21
6	(South Korea) Cho Gun-woo (South Korea) Kwon Yi-goo	12	16

==== Section 2 ====
First Round
3	(Indonesia) Markis Kido (Indonesia) Hendra Setiawan	21	21
PFQ	(Malaysia) Kok Zheng Yi (Malaysia) Kong Keat Zhen	12	12
(Chinese Taipei) Chen Chung-jen (Chinese Taipei) Lin Yen-jui	13	16
(Indonesia) Marcus Fernaldi Gideon (Indonesia) Agripina Prima Rahmanto Putra	21	21
7	(Chinese Taipei) Chen Hung-ling (Chinese Taipei) Lin Yu-lang	17	11
(South Korea) Kim Gi-jung (South Korea) Shin Baek-cheol	21	21
(Chinese Taipei) Tsai Chia-hsin (Chinese Taipei) Tseng Ching-chung	27	21
(Hong Kong) Lee Chun Hei (Hong Kong) Ng Ka Long	25	12

Second Round
3	(Indonesia) Markis Kido (Indonesia) Hendra Setiawan	21	8	21
(Indonesia) Marcus Fernaldi Gideon (Indonesia) Agripina Prima Rahmanto Putra	11	21	15
(South Korea) Kim Gi-jung (South Korea) Shin Baek-cheol	19	21	21
(Chinese Taipei) Tsai Chia-hsin (Chinese Taipei) Tseng Ching-chung	21	18	12

Quarterfinals
3	(Indonesia) Markis Kido (Indonesia) Hendra Setiawan	13	14
(South Korea) Kim Gi-jung (South Korea) Shin Baek-cheol	21	21
