= 2006 Hong Kong Open (badminton) =

Badminton championships

The 2006 Hong Kong Open in badminton was held from August 28 to September 2.

== Results ==
=== Men's singles ===
Quarterfinals
1	(China) Lin Dan	4
9/16	(Indonesia) Taufik Hidayat	1
(Indonesia) Sony Dwi Kuncoro	16	20
5/8	(Denmark) Kenneth Jonassen	21	22
5/8	(Thailand) Boonsak Ponsana	11	10
3/4	(China) Chen Jin	21	21
5/8	(South Korea) Lee Hyun-il	13	15
2	(Malaysia) Lee Chong Wei	21	21

Semifinals
1	(China) Lin Dan	16	23	21
5/8	(Denmark) Kenneth Jonassen	21	21	12
3/4	(China) Chen Jin	21	19	22
2	(Malaysia) Lee Chong Wei	11	21	24

Finals
1	(China) Lin Dan	21	8	21
2	(Malaysia) Lee Chong Wei	19	21	16

=== Women's singles ===
Quarterfinals
1	(China) Zhang Ning	21	21
(Netherlands) Yao Jie	10	4
(China) Jiang Yanjiao	21	21
5/8	(France) Pi Hongyan	19	13
(Denmark) Tine Rasmussen	21	22
3/4	(Hong Kong) Wang Chen	18	20
(Bulgaria) Petya Nedelcheva	12	15
2	(China) Xie Xingfang	21	21

Semifinals
1	(China) Zhang Ning	21	21
(China) Jiang Yanjiao	17	17
(Denmark) Tine Rasmussen	15	14
2	(China) Xie Xingfang	21	21

Finals
1	(China) Zhang Ning
2	(China) Xie Xingfang	WO	WO
