= Tanongsak Saensomboonsuk =

Thai badminton player (born 1990)

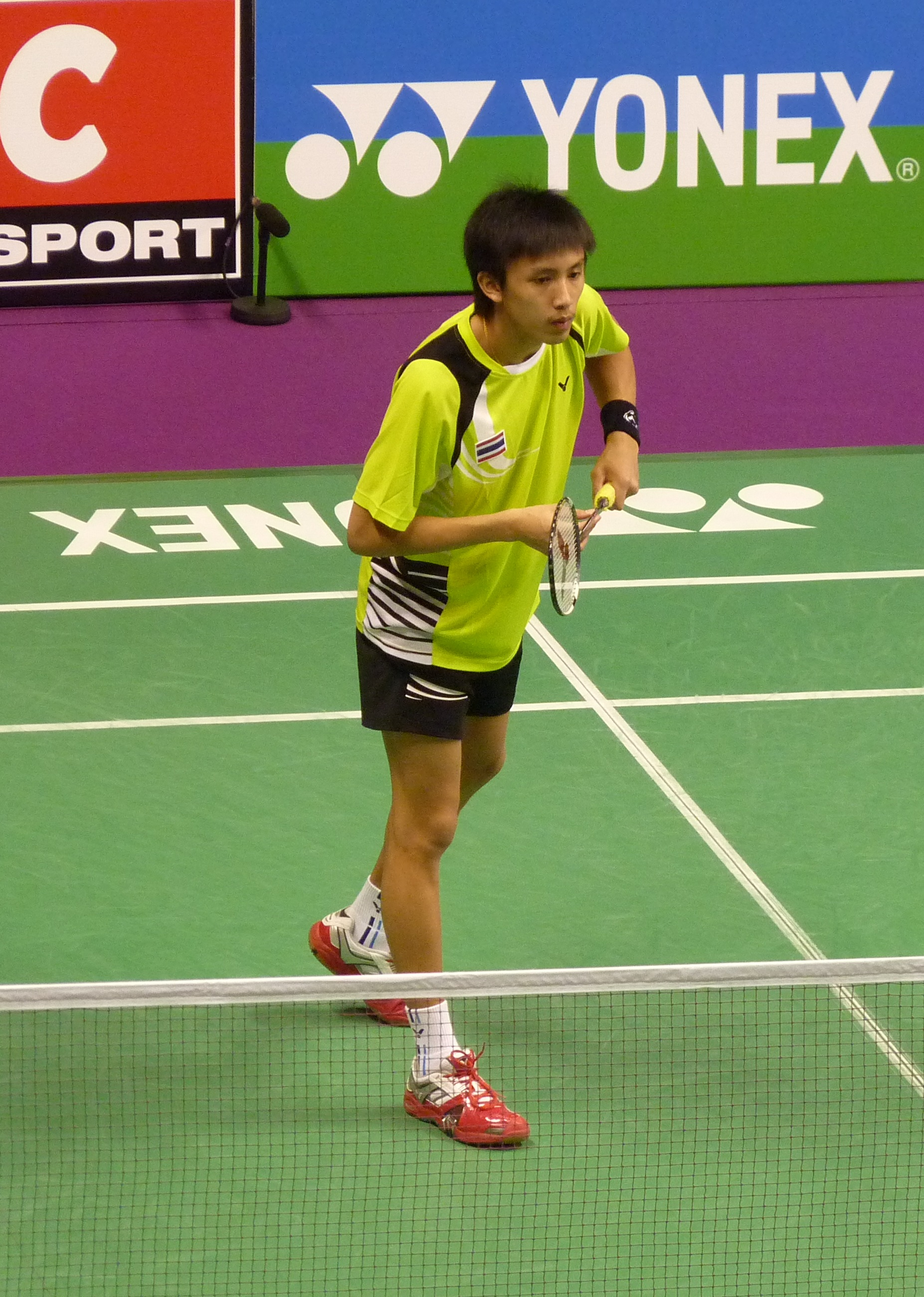

Personal information
- Born: 13 October 1990 (age 36) Bangkok, Thailand
- Height: 1.80 m (5 ft 11 in)
- Weight: 70 kg (154 lb)

Sport
- Country: Thailand
- Sport: Badminton
- Handedness: Left

Men's singles
- Highest ranking: 9 (31 October 2013)
- Current ranking: 56 (9 August 2022)
- BWF profile
Medal record
Men's badminton
Representing Thailand
Sudirman Cup
Bronze medal – third place	2013 Kuala Lumpur	Mixed team
Bronze medal – third place	2017 Gold Coast	Mixed team
Asian Games
Bronze medal – third place	2010 Guangzhou	Men's team
Asia Mixed Team Championships
Bronze medal – third place	2017 Ho Chi Minh	Mixed team
Southeast Asian Games
Gold medal – first place	2013 Naypyitaw	Men's singles
Silver medal – second place	2011 Jakarta–Palembang	Men's singles
Silver medal – second place	2015 Singapore	Men's team
Bronze medal – third place	2009 Vientiane	Men's singles
Bronze medal – third place	2009 Vientiane	Men's team
Bronze medal – third place	2011 Jakarta–Palembang	Men's team
Bronze medal – third place	2015 Singapore	Men's singles
Summer Universiade
Gold medal – first place	2013 Kazan	Men's singles
Bronze medal – third place	2013 Kazan	Mixed team
Bronze medal – third place	2015 Gwangju	Mixed team

Tanongsak Saensomboonsuk (Thai: ทนงศักดิ์ แสนสมบูรณ์สุข;born 13 October 1990) is a Thai badminton player. He won his first career Superseries title by winning the Denmark Open on 23 October 2016, becoming the first Thai to win a men's singles title in a Superseries Premier tournament. He is studying for a Bachelor's degree in Business Administration at Siam University.

== Achievements ==
=== Southeast Asian Games ===
Men's singles
Year	Venue	Opponent	Score	Result
2009	Gym Hall 1, National Sports Complex; Vientiane, Laos	(Indonesia) Sony Dwi Kuncoro	10–21, 21–18, 17–21	Bronze
2011	Istora Senayan; Jakarta, Indonesia	(Indonesia) Simon Santoso	10–21, 21–11, 19–21	Silver
2013	Wunna Theikdi Indoor Stadium; Naypyidaw, Myanmar	(Indonesia) Dionysius Hayom Rumbaka	22–20, 21–17	Gold
2015	Singapore Indoor Stadium, Singapore	(Malaysia) Chong Wei Feng	21–13, 18–21, 15–21	Bronze

=== Summer Universiade ===
Men's singles
Year	Venue	Opponent	Score	Result
2013	Tennis Academy; Kazan, Russia	(China) Gao Huan	21–12, 21–17	Gold

=== BWF World Tour (2 runners-up) ===
The BWF World Tour, which was announced on 19 March 2017 and implemented in 2018, is a series of elite badminton tournaments sanctioned by the Badminton World Federation (BWF). The BWF World Tour is divided into levels of World Tour Finals, Super 1000, Super 750, Super 500, Super 300 (part of the HSBC World Tour), and the BWF Tour Super 100.

Men's singles
Year	Tournament	Level	Opponent	Score	Result
2019	U.S. Open	Super 300	(Chinese Taipei) Lin Chun-yi	10–21, 13–21	(silver) Runner-up
2019	Indonesia Masters	Super 100	(China) Sun Feixiang	19–21, 14–21	(silver) Runner-up

=== BWF Superseries (1 title) ===
The BWF Superseries, which was launched on 14 December 2006 and implemented in 2007, was a series of elite badminton tournaments, sanctioned by the Badminton World Federation (BWF). BWF Superseries levels were Superseries and Superseries Premier. A season of Superseries consisted of twelve tournaments around the world that had been introduced since 2011. Successful players were invited to the Superseries Finals, which were held at the end of each year.

Men's singles
Year	Tournament	Opponent	Score	Result
2016	Denmark Open	(South Korea) Son Wan-ho	21–13, 23–21	(gold) Winner

BWF Super Series Premier tournament

=== BWF Grand Prix (1 title, 3 runners-up) ===
The BWF Grand Prix had two levels, the Grand Prix and Grand Prix Gold. It was a series of badminton tournaments sanctioned by the Badminton World Federation (BWF) and played between 2007 and 2017.

Men's singles
Year	Tournament	Opponent	Score	Result
2011	Chinese Taipei Open	(Indonesia) Tommy Sugiarto	15–21, 21–15, 17–21	(silver) Runner-up
2012	Korea Grand Prix Gold	(South Korea) Lee Dong-keun	17–21, 14–21	(silver) Runner-up
2012	India Grand Prix Gold	(India) Kashyap Parupalli	19–21, 21–14, 17–21	(silver) Runner-up
2016	Thailand Open	(Indonesia) Sony Dwi Kuncoro	21–15, 21–16	(gold) Winner

BWF Grand Prix Gold tournament

=== BWF International Challenge/Series (2 titles, 1 runner-up) ===
Men's singles
Year	Tournament	Opponent	Score	Result
2008	Osaka International	(Japan) Koichi Saeki	13–21, 12–21	(silver) Runner-up
2008	Smiling Fish International	(Thailand) Pakkawat Vilailak	21–18, 21–23, 21–15	(gold) Winner
2009	Smiling Fish International	(India) Kashyap Parupalli	23–21, 21–14	(gold) Winner

BWF International Challenge tournament
BWF International Series tournament
