= Derek Wong =

Singaporean badminton player

Derek Wong 黄梓良
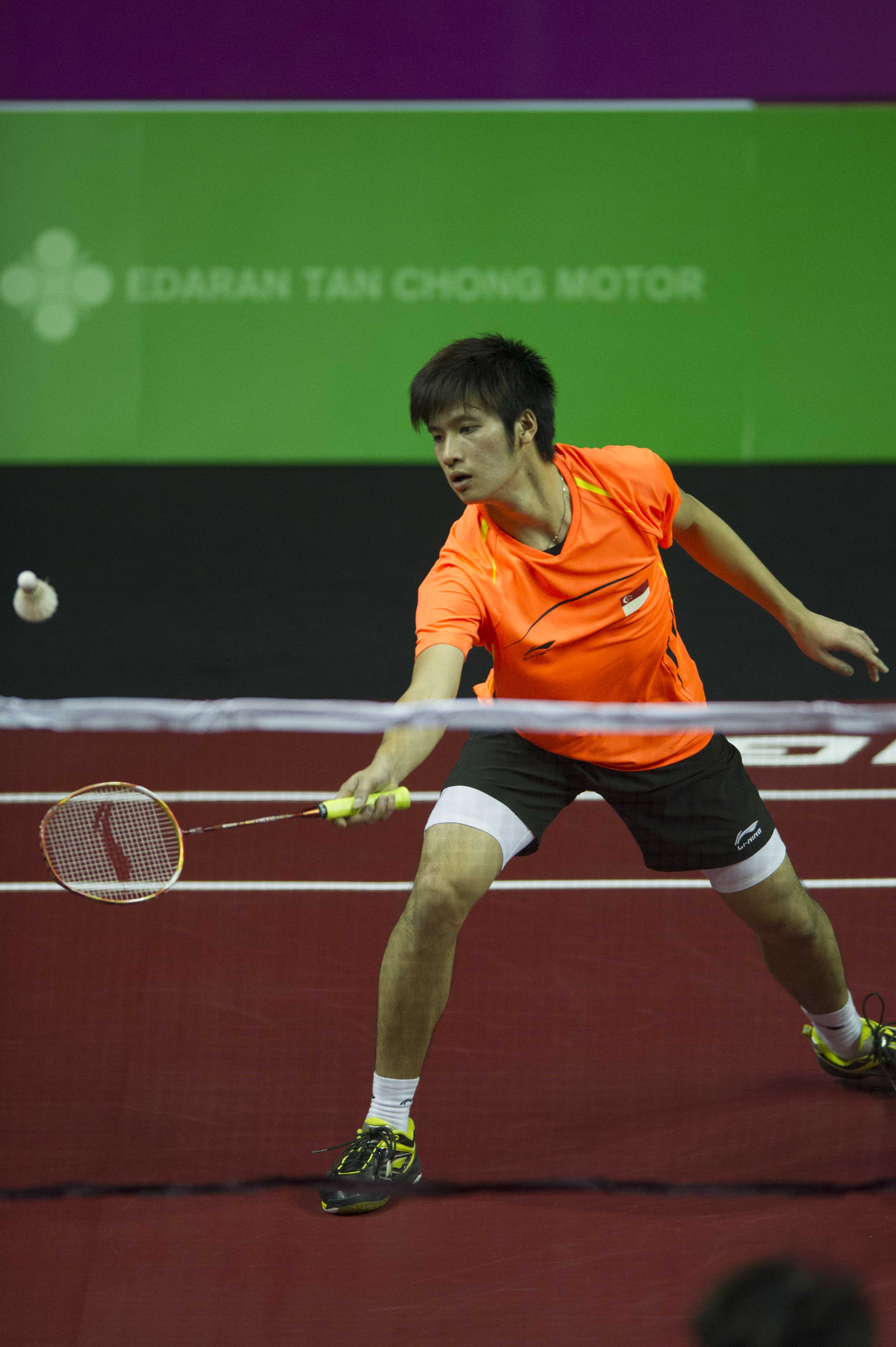
- Wong at 2013 Axiata Cup

Personal information
- Born: 13 January 1989 (age 37) Singapore
- Height: 1.74 m (5 ft 9 in)
- Weight: 67 kg (148 lb)

Sport
- Country: Singapore
- Sport: Badminton
- Handedness: Right

Men's singles
- Career record: 185 wins, 156 losses
- Highest ranking: 37 (29 January 2015)
- BWF profile
Medal record
Men's badminton
Representing Singapore
Commonwealth Games
Silver medal – second place	2014 Glasgow	Men's singles
Bronze medal – third place	2014 Glasgow	Mixed team
Southeast Asian Games
Silver medal – second place	2007 Nakhon Ratchasima	Men's team
Bronze medal – third place	2009 Vientiane	Men's team
Bronze medal – third place	2011 Jakarta–Palembang	Men's singles
Bronze medal – third place	2011 Jakarta–Palembang	Men's team
Bronze medal – third place	2015 Singapore	Men's team
World Junior Championships
Bronze medal – third place	2007 Waitakere City	Mixed team

Derek Wong Zi Liang (Chinese: 黃梓良, 13 January 1989) is a retired Singaporean badminton player. Wong is a two-time Olympian, who took part at the 2012 and 2016 Summer Olympics, where he was flag bearer in the latter's Parade of Nations.

== Early life ==
Wong was born on 13 January 1989, in Singapore, to parents Wong Shoon Keat and Irene Lee. He grew up in a badminton-loving family with three other brothers (Shawn, Jamie and Jason). Both his parents are former national champions and they own a badminton shop at the old Singapore Badminton Hall. Wong started playing badminton, at age 5 when his father took him to the hall to play badminton for the first time. Since then, he would do his school homework at the shop before playing badminton with some friendly uncles in the hall till his parents closed the shop for the day.

Wong turned professional in 2008 after consulting with his parents and peers, right after his O-levels.

== Career ==
=== 2011 World Championships ===
Wong shocked Indonesia's Taufik Hidayat, a former Olympic champion in the second round of the World Championships. He defeated the Indonesian star 21–17, 21–14 to earn a place in the third round against Hans-Kristian Vittinghus of Denmark.

=== 2011 Southeast Asian Games ===
Wong upset Vietnam's Nguyễn Tiến Minh, then ranked in the world's top 10, at the quarterfinals of the Sea Games. He also came agonisingly close to upsetting the eventual gold medalist, Simon Santoso, in the next round. He led in the early stages of the semifinal match before succumbing to the Indonesian in straight sets.

=== 2012 London Olympics ===
Wong's Olympic debut ended after a 21–17, 21–14 loss to Jan Ø. Jørgensen in his final Group I match at London's Wembley Arena on 31 July to finish second in the three-man group. "Of course, I wanted to play more games instead of just two. But being in my first Olympics has been a huge experience, and one that I will use for my career," Wong said afterwards. He had earlier beaten Israel's Misha Zilberman 21–9, 21–15 on 29 July.

=== 2014 Commonwealth Games ===
Wong advanced to the men's singles final but lost to Parupalli Kashyap of India 14–21, 21–11, 21–19, winning a silver medal.

=== 2016 Rio Olympics ===
Wong qualified for the 2016 Summer Olympics and was the Singaporean flag bearer. During group play, he finished in second place in his group and did not advance.

== Retirement ==
After the 2016 Olympics, Wong resigned from the Singapore Badminton Association (SBA), thus confirming his retirement from professional badminton. He later joined consulting firm Deloitte on 26 September 2016, to start his post-badminton career. Wong is also looking to groom the next generation of shuttlers by opening his own badminton academy in the near future.

== Personal life ==
Wong started dating his fellow national shuttler Vanessa Neo in 2007 when he joined the national squad full-time. They got married in May 2015 and have two children together.

== Awards ==
Wong received the 2013, 2015 and 2017 Meritorious Award from the Singapore National Olympic Committee.

== Achievements ==
=== Commonwealth Games ===
Men's singles
Year	Venue	Opponent	Score	Result
2014	Emirates Arena; Glasgow, Scotland	(India) Kashyap Parupalli	14–21, 21–11, 19–21	Silver

=== Southeast Asian Games ===
Men's singles
Year	Venue	Opponent	Score	Result
2011	Istora Senayan; Jakarta, Indonesia	(Indonesia) Simon Santoso	17–21, 12–21	Bronze

=== BWF International Challenge/Series ===
Men's singles
Year	Tournament	Opponent	Score	Result
2011	Iran Fajr International	(Indonesia) Tommy Sugiarto	17–21, 21–18, 11–21	(silver) Runner-up
2011	White Nights	(Chinese Taipei) Hsu Jen-hao	18–21, 21–14, 12–21	(silver) Runner-up
2012	Vietnam International	(Indonesia) Wisnu Yuli Prasetyo	17–21, 22–20, 21–10	(gold) Winner
2013	Singapore International	(Chinese Taipei) Lin Yu-hsien	21–18, 21–14	(gold) Winner
2015	Bahrain International Challenge	(India) Sameer Verma	14–21, 10–21	(silver) Runner-up

Men's doubles
Year	Tournament	Partner	Opponent	Score	Result
2011	Maldives International	(Singapore) Ashton Chen	(Austria) Jürgen Koch (Austria) Peter Zauner	21–19, 21–17	(gold) Winner

BWF International Challenge tournament
BWF International Series tournament

Olympic Games
Preceded by Feng Tianwei	Flagbearer for Singapore; Rio de Janeiro 2016	Succeeded by Loh Kean Yew; Yu Mengyu
