= 2008 China Open Super Series =

Tournament details
- Dates: November 18, 2008 - November 23, 2008
- Total prize money: US$250,000
- Venue: Yuanshen Sports Development Center
- Location: Shanghai, China

The 2008 China Open Super Series is the twelfth tournament of the 2008 BWF Super Series in badminton. It was held in Shanghai, China from November 18 to November 23, 2008.

== Men's singles ==
=== Seeds ===
1. (Malaysia) Lee Chong Wei
2. (China) Lin Dan
3. (China) Chen Jin
4. (China) Bao Chunlai
5. (Denmark) Peter Gade
6. (Denmark) Joachim Persson
7. (Indonesia) Taufik Hidayat
8. (South Korea) Park Sung Hwan

=== Results ===
1st round
1	(Malaysia) Lee Chong Wei	8	21	21
(China) Qiu Yanbo	21	14	16
(Macau) Lam Chi Man	7	10
(Hong Kong) Ng Wei	21	21
5	(Denmark) Peter Gade	21	21
(Hong Kong) Chan Yan Kit	9	18
(Malaysia) Wong Choong Hann	21	21
(India) Chetan Anand	10	14
3	(China) Chen Jin	21	21
PFQ	(Scotland) Alistair Casey	8	9
(China) Chen Hong	21	21
PFQ	(China) Zhu Weilun	17	13
8	(South Korea) Park Sung Hwan	21	21
(England) Andrew Smith	19	15
(South Korea) Hong Ji Hoon	21	21
(Netherlands) Eric Pang	14	12
(Germany) Marc Zwiebler	15	21	12
PFQ	(China) Wen Kai	21	14	21
(Canada) Bobby Milroy	11	15
6	(Denmark) Joachim Persson	21	21
(India) Arvind Bhat	21	21
PFQ	(Malaysia) Pei Wei Chung	9	13
(Czech Republic) Petr Koukal	21	21
PFQ	(Austria) Clemens Michael Smola	4	5
(China) Du Pengyu	12	21	21
(China) Zhou Wenlong	21	19	10
(Thailand) Boonsak Ponsana	12	14
7	(Indonesia) Taufik Hidayat	21	21
(China) Lü Yi	20	15
(China) Gong Weijie	22	21
(Macau) Wai Lok Cheang	2	11
2	(China) Lin Dan	21	21

2nd round
1	(Malaysia) Lee Chong Wei	21	21
(Hong Kong) Ng Wei	13	14
5	(Denmark) Peter Gade	21	18	16
(Malaysia) Wong Choong Hann	17	21	21
3	(China) Chen Jin	21	16	21
(China) Chen Hong	11	21	10
8	(South Korea) Park Sung Hwan	21	21
(South Korea) Hong Ji Hoon	16	18
PFQ	(China) Wen Kai	21	21
6	(Denmark) Joachim Persson	10	17
(India) Arvind Bhat	18	21	21
(Czech Republic) Petr Koukal	21	18	15
(China) Du Pengyu	22	21
7	(Indonesia) Taufik Hidayat	20	11
(China) Gong Weijie	13	13
2	(China) Lin Dan	21	21

Quarterfinals
1	(Malaysia) Lee Chong Wei	21	19	21
(Malaysia) Wong Choong Hann	19	21	10
3	(China) Chen Jin	11	21	18
8	(South Korea) Park Sung Hwan	21	13	21
PFQ	(China) Wen Kai	21	21
(India) Arvind Bhat	13	10
(China) Du Pengyu	13	16
2	(China) Lin Dan	21	21

Semifinals
1	(Malaysia) Lee Chong Wei	17	21	21
8	(South Korea) Park Sung Hwan	21	8	7
Finals
1	(Malaysia) Lee Chong Wei	18	9
2	(China) Lin Dan	21	21
PFQ	(China) Wen Kai	17	21	17
2	(China) Lin Dan	21	18	21

== Women's singles ==
=== Seeds ===
1. (Hong Kong) Zhou Mi
2. (China) Lu Lan
3. (Denmark) Tine Rasmussen
4. (China) Xie Xingfang
5. (China) Zhu Lin
6. (France) Pi Hongyan
7. (Malaysia) Wong Mew Choo
8. (Germany) Xu Huaiwen

=== Results ===
1st round
1	(China) Zhou Mi	21	21
PFQ	(Macau) Mak Ka Lei	6	6
(Thailand) Salakjit Ponsana	21	21
(Netherlands) Yao Jie	7	18
57	(Malaysia) Wong Mew Choo	21	12
(Finland) Anu Nieminen	9	6R
(Macau) Long Ying	12	11
(China) Zhu Jingjing	21	21
3	(Denmark) Tine Rasmussen	22	21	21
(China) Liu Jie	24	9	14
(Malaysia) Julia Wong Pei Xian	21	21
PFQ	(France) Weny Rahmawati	9	17
8	(Germany) Xu Huaiwen	21	21
(South Korea) Hwang Hye-youn	15	19
(Netherlands) Judith Meulendijks	16	21	12
(China) Wang Lin	21	16	21
(China) Jiang Yanjiao	21	21
(China) Wang Yihan	18	18
(Hong Kong) Wang Chen	17	21	21
6	(France) Pi Hongyan	21	13	12
(South Korea) Jang Soo-young	12	16
PFQ	(South Korea) Bae Youn-joo	21	21
(Japan) Ai Goto	15	15
4	(China) Xie Xingfang	21	21
(Canada) Anna Rice	15	12
Q	(China) Han Li	21	21
(India) Saina Nehwal	6	21	19
5	(China) Zhu Lin	21	12	21
(Malaysia) Lydia Cheah Li Ya	14	11
Q	(China) Li Xuerui	21	21
(Canada) Charmaine Reid	12	10
PFQ	(Germany) Nicole Grether	21	21

2nd round
1	(China) Zhou Mi	18	21	21
(Thailand) Salakjit Ponsana	21	6	15
5	(Malaysia) Wong Mew Choo	11	14
(China) Zhu Jingjing	21	21
3	(Denmark) Tine Rasmussen	20	21	10
(Malaysia) Julia Wong Pei Xian	21	10	21
8	(Germany) Xu Huaiwen	17	15
(China) Wang Lin	21	21
(China) Jiang Yanjiao	21	19	21
6	(Hong Kong) Wang Chen	19	21	18
PFQ	(South Korea) Bae Youn-joo	17	20
4	(China) Xie Xingfang	21	22
Q	(China) Han Li	15	21	18
5	(China) Zhu Lin	21	9	21
Q	(China) Li Xuerui	21	21
PFQ	(Germany) Nicole Grether	4	12

Quarterfinals
1	(Hong Kong) Zhou Mi	11	11
(China) Zhu Jingjing	21	21
(Malaysia) Julia Wong Pei Xian	17	14
(China) Wang Lin	21	21
(China) Jiang Yanjiao	23	21
4	(China) Xie Xingfang	21	14
5	(China) Zhu Lin	21	21
Q	(China) Li Xuerui	13	15

Semifinals
(China) Zhu Jingjing	14	21	21
8	(China) Wang Lin	21	12	9
Finals
(China) Zhu Jingjing	15	13
(China) Jiang Yanjiao	21	21
(China) Jiang Yanjiao	21	21
5	(China) Zhu Lin	16	11

== Men's doubles ==
=== Seeds ===
1. (China) Cai Yun / Fu Haifeng
2. (Denmark) Lars Paaske / Jonas Rasmussen
3. (South Korea) Jung Jae-sung / Lee Yong-dae
4. (Malaysia) Mohd Zakry Abdul Latif / Mohd Fairuzizuan
5. (Malaysia) Koo Kien Keat / Tan Boon Heong
6. (Denmark) Mathias Boe / Carsten Mogensen
7. (Malaysia) Choong Tan Fook / Lee Wan Wah
8. (United States) Tony Gunawan / (Indonesia) Candra Wijaya

=== Results ===
Quarterfinals
1	(China) Cai Yun (China) Fu Haifeng	17	21	18
8	(United States) Tony Gunawan (Indonesia) Candra Wijaya	21	19	21
4	(Malaysia) Mohd Zakry Abdul Latif (Malaysia) Mohd Fairuzizuan	22	18	22
6	(Denmark) Mathias Boe (Denmark) Carsten Mogensen	20	21	24
7	(Malaysia) Choong Tan Fook (Malaysia) Lee Wan Wah	13	16
3	(South Korea) Jung Jae-sung (South Korea) Lee Yong-dae	21	21
5	(Malaysia) Koo Kien Keat (Malaysia) Tan Boon Heong	19	22	21
2	(Denmark) Lars Paaske (Denmark) Jonas Rasmussen	21	20	14

Semifinals
8	(United States) Tony Gunawan (Indonesia) Candra Wijaya	21	14	17
6	(Denmark) Mathias Boe (Denmark) Carsten Mogensen	17	21	21
3	(South Korea) Jung Jae-sung (South Korea) Lee Yong-dae	21	21
5	(Malaysia) Koo Kien Keat (Malaysia) Tan Boon Heong	17	12

Finals
6	(Denmark) Mathias Boe (Denmark) Carsten Mogensen	21	17	13
3	(South Korea) Jung Jae-sung (South Korea) Lee Yong-dae	17	21	21

== Women's doubles ==
=== Seeds ===
1. (China) Du Jing / Yu Yang
2. (Malaysia) Chin Eei Hui / Wong Pei Tty
3. (Denmark) Lena Frier Kristiansen / Kamilla Rytter Juhl
4. (South Korea) Ha Jung-eun / Kim Min-jung
5. (China) Zhang Yawen / Zhao Tingting
6. (Thailand) Duanganong Aroonkesorn / Kunchala Voravichitchaikul
7. (Germany) Nicole Grether / (Canada) Charmaine Reid
8. (China) Cheng Shu / Zhao Yunlei

=== Results ===
Quarterfinals
1	(China) Du Jing (China) Yu Yang	19	21	21
8	(China) Cheng Shu (China) Zhao Yunlei	21	19	9
3	(Denmark) Lena Frier Kristiansen (Denmark) Kamilla Rytter Juhl	17	21	9
5	(China) Zhang Yawen (China) Zhao Tingting	21	18	21
7	(China) Wang Siyun (China) Zhang Jinkang	14	19
3	(South Korea) Ha Jung-eun (South Korea) Kim Min-jung	21	21
(China) Xie Jing (China) Zhong Qianxin	15	13
2	(Malaysia) Chin Eei Hui (Malaysia) Wong Pei Tty	21	21

Semifinals
1	(China) Du Jing (China) Yu Yang	18	21	14
5	(China) Zhang Yawen (China) Zhao Tingting	21	18	21
4	(South Korea) Ha Jung-eun (South Korea) Kim Min-jung	13	21	13
2	(Malaysia) Chin Eei Hui (Malaysia) Wong Pei Tty	21	11	21

Finals
5	(China) Zhang Yawen (China) Zhao Tingting	21	21
2	(Malaysia) Chin Eei Hui (Malaysia) Wong Pei Tty	14	19

== Mixed doubles ==
=== Seeds ===
1. (China) He Hanbin / Yu Yang
2. (China) Xie Zhongbo / Zhang Yawen
3. (Denmark) Thomas Laybourn / Kamilla Rytter Juhl
4. (Thailand) Sudket Prapakamol / Saralee Thoungthongkam
5. (South Korea) Lee Yong-dae / Lee Hyo-jung
6. (England) Anthony Clark / Donna Kellogg
7. (England) Robert Blair / (Scotland) Imogen Bankier
8. (Thailand) Songphon Anugritayawon / Kunchala Voravichitchaikul

=== Results ===
Quarterfinals
1	(China) He Hanbin (China) Yu Yang	12	21	14
5	(South Korea) Lee Yong-dae (South Korea) Lee Hyo-jung	21	12	21
3	(Denmark) Thomas Laybourn (Denmark) Kamilla Rytter Juhl	21	20	21
5	(South Korea) Yoo Yeon-seong (South Korea) Kim Min-jung	16	22	13
7	(England) Robert Blair (Scotland) Imogen Bankier	15	12
(China) Zheng Bo (China) Ma Jin	21	21
(China) Shen Ye (China) Tian Qing	22	16	18
(China) Xu Chen (China) Zhao Yunlei	20	21	21

Semifinals
5	(South Korea) Lee Yong-dae (South Korea) Lee Hyo-jung	21	21
3	(Denmark) Thomas Laybourn (Denmark) Kamilla Rytter Juhl	15	16
(China) Zheng Bo (China) Ma Jin	17	15
(China) Xu Chen (China) Zhao Yunlei	21	21

Finals
5	(South Korea) Lee Yong-dae (South Korea) Lee Hyo-jung	21	21
(China) Xu Chen (China) Zhao Yunlei	16	15
