= 2011 BWF World Championships – Men's singles =

Badminton championships

Men's singles at the 2011 BWF World Championships
- Venue: Wembley Arena
- Location: London, England
- Dates: August 8, 2011 – August 14, 2011

Medalists
gold medal	Lin Dan	China
silver medal	Lee Chong Wei	Malaysia
bronze medal	Chen Jin	China
bronze medal	Peter Gade	Denmark

The men's singles tournament of the 2011 BWF World Championships (World Badminton Championships) was held from August 8 to 14. Chen Jin was the defending champion.
Lin Dan defeated Lee Chong Wei 20–22, 21–14, 23–21 in the final.

== Seeds ==
1. (Malaysia) Lee Chong Wei (final)
2. (China) Lin Dan (champion)
3. (Denmark) Peter Gade (semi-finals)
4. (Indonesia) Taufik Hidayat (second round)
5. (China) Chen Long (first round)
6. (China) Chen Jin (semi-finals)
7. (Vietnam) Nguyễn Tiến Minh (quarter-finals)
8. (China) Du Pengyu (third round)
9. (South Korea) Park Sung-hwan (third round)
10. (Thailand) Boonsak Ponsana (third round)
11. (Japan) Sho Sasaki (quarter-finals)
12. (South Korea) Lee Hyun-il (third round)
13. (Indonesia) Simon Santoso (third round)
14. (Germany) Marc Zwiebler (second round)
15. (Japan) Kenichi Tago (first round)
16. (Hong Kong) Hu Yun (first round)

== Draw ==
=== Finals ===
Quarterfinals
1	(Malaysia) Lee Chong Wei	21	21
(Guatemala) Kevin Cordón	7	13
(Denmark) Hans-Kristian Vittinghus	17	13
6	(China) Chen Jin	21	21
7	(Vietnam) Nguyễn Tiến Minh	21	19	13
3	(Denmark) Peter Gade	17	21	21
11	(Japan) Sho Sasaki	14	16
2	(China) Lin Dan	21	21

Semifinals
1	(Malaysia) Lee Chong Wei	21	21
6	(China) Chen Jin	13	9
3	(Denmark) Peter Gade	24	7	15
2	(China) Lin Dan	22	21	21

Final
1	(Malaysia) Lee Chong Wei	22	14	21
2	(China) Lin Dan	20	21	23

=== Section 1 ===
First Round
1	(Malaysia) Lee CW	21	21
(Thailand) T Saensomboonsuk	15	17
(Finland) V Lång	21	21
(Indonesia) DH Rumbaka	17	18
9	(South Korea) Park S-h	21	21
(Chinese Taipei) Hsueh H-y	15	15
(South Korea) Shon W-h	21	21
(South Africa) J Maliekal	12	8
5	(China) Chen L	19	21	25
(Guatemala) K Cordón	21	8	27
(England) C Baxter	8	19
(Sweden) H Hurskainen	21	21
14	(Germany) M Zwiebler	21	21
(Ukraine) V Atrashchenkov	19	10
(Belgium) Y Tan	21	17	15
(Spain) P Abián	16	21	21

Second Round
1	(Malaysia) Lee CW	21	21
(Finland) V Lång	10	11
9	(South Korea) Park S-h	21	21
(South Korea) Shon W-h	14	10
(Guatemala) K Cordón	21	21
(Sweden) H Hurskainen	19	17
14	(Germany) M Zwiebler	17	21	22
(Spain) P Abián	21	7	24

Third Round
1	(Malaysia) Lee CW	21	21
9	(South Korea) Park S-h	10	5
(Guatemala) K Cordón	21	19	21
(Spain) P Abián	19	21	17

Quarterfinals
1	(Malaysia) Lee CW	21	21
(Guatemala) K Cordón	7	13

=== Section 2 ===
First Round
4	(Indonesia) T Hidayat	21	21
(Peru) R Pacheco	17	6
(Singapore) D Wong	22	19	21
(Poland) P Wacha	20	21	17
16	(Hong Kong) Hu Y	22	18
(Denmark) H-K Vittinghus	24	21
(France) M Lo Ying Ping	21	21
(United States) S Pongnairat	13	15
6	(China) Chen J	21	21
(Estonia) R Must	8	10
(Canada) S Wojcikiewicz	12	9
(Netherlands) D Palyama	21	21
15	(Japan) K Tago	12	19
(India) A Jayaram	21	21
(Slovakia) M Matejka	10	6
(Russia) V Ivanov	21	21

Second Round
4	(Indonesia) T Hidayat	17	14
(Singapore) D Wong	21	21
(Denmark) H-K Vittinghus	21	21
(France) M Lo Ying Ping	8	14
6	(China) Chen J	21	21
(Netherlands) D Palyama	13	17
(India) A Jayaram	21	21
(Russia) V Ivanov	19	17

Third Round
(Singapore) D Wong	16	10
(Denmark) H-K Vittinghus	21	21
6	(China) Chen J	18	21	21
(India) A Jayaram	21	12	11

Quarterfinals
(Denmark) H-K Vittinghus	17	13
6	(China) Chen J	21	21

=== Section 3 ===
First Round
(Chinese Taipei) Hsieh Y-h	7	9
(Malaysia) Wong CH	21	21
(Netherlands) E Pang	21	17	10
10	(Thailand) B Ponsana	12	21	21
(India) K Parupalli	21	23	21
(Germany) D Domke	13	25	11
(Israel) M Zilberman	10	14
7	(Vietnam) Nguyen TM	21	21
(Czech Republic) P Koukal	5	8
(Ukraine) D Zavadsky	21	21
(Portugal) P Martins	10	14
13	(Indonesia) S Santoso	21	21
(Iran) K Mehrabi	18	12
(Russia) S Pukhov	21	21
(England) R Ouseph	8	18
3	(Denmark) P Gade	21	21

Second Round
(Malaysia) Wong CH	13	18
10	(Thailand) B Ponsana	21	21
(India) K Parupalli	22	21	20
7	(Vietnam) Nguyen TM	24	17	22
(Ukraine) D Zavadsky	19	8
13	(Indonesia) S Santoso	21	21
(Russia) S Pukhov	5	9
3	(Denmark) P Gade	21	21

Third Round
10	(Thailand) B Ponsana	11	15
7	(Vietnam) Nguyen TM	21	21
13	(Indonesia) S Santoso	18	21	14
3	(Denmark) P Gade	21	14	21

Quarterfinals
7	(Vietnam) Nguyen TM	21	19	13
3	(Denmark) P Gade	17	21	21

=== Section 4 ===
First Round
(Scotland) A Casey	16	10
(England) T Penty	21	21
(France) B Leverdez	21	12	11
11	(Japan) S Sasaki	19	21	21
(Brazil) D Paiola	13	9
(Japan) K Yamada	21	21
(Singapore) A Chen	10	21	12
8	(China) D Pengyu	21	16	21
(Canada) D Snider	16	19
(Finland) E Heino	21	21
(Hong Kong) Wong WK	17	19
12	(South Korea) Lee H-i	21	21
(Republic of Ireland) S Evans	21	21
(Austria) M Lahnsteiner	15	16
(Lithuania) K Navickas	11	10
2	(China) Lin D	21	21

Second Round
(England) T Penty	13	13
11	(Japan) S Sasaki	21	21
(Japan) K Yamada	12	14
8	(China) Du PY	21	21
(Finland) E Heino	10	7
12	(South Korea) Lee H-i	21	21
(Republic of Ireland) S Evans	15	16
2	(China) Lin D	21	21

Third Round
11	(Japan) S Sasaki	10	24	21
8	(China) Du PY	21	22	10
12	(South Korea) Lee H-i	16	13
2	(China) Lin D	21	21

Quarterfinals
11	(Japan) S Sasaki	14	16
2	(China) Lin D	21	21
