= 2013 Korea Grand Prix Gold =

Tournament details
- Dates: 5–10 November
- Level: Grand Prix Gold
- Total prize money: US$120,000
- Venue: Jeonju Indoor Badminton Court
- Location: Jeonju, South Korea

Champions
- Men's singles: (South Korea) Lee Hyun-il
- Women's singles: (South Korea) Bae Yeon-ju
- Men's doubles: (South Korea) Kim Gi-jung (South Korea) Kim Sa-rang
- Women's doubles: (South Korea) Jang Ye-na (South Korea) Kim So-yeong
- Mixed doubles: (South Korea) Yoo Yeon-seong (South Korea) Jang Ye-na

The 2013 Korea Grand Prix Gold was the fifteenth badminton tournament of the 2013 BWF Grand Prix Gold and Grand Prix. The tournament was held in Jeonju Indoor Badminton Court, Jeonju, South Korea November 5–10, 2013 and had a total purse of $120,000.

== Men's singles ==
=== Seeds ===
1. (Chinese Taipei) Hsu Jen-hao (second round)
2. (South Korea) Lee Dong-keun (third round)
3. (Malaysia) Mohd Arif Abdul Latif (first round)
4. (Indonesia) Wisnu Yuli Prasetyo (first round)
5. (Indonesia) Riyanto Subagja (second round)
6. (Malaysia) Zulfadli Zulkiffli (second round)
7. (Israel) Misha Zilberman (second round)
8. (Japan) Riichi Takeshita (third round)
9. (Czech Republic) Petr Koukal (second round)
10. (Malaysia) Iskandar Zulkarnain Zainuddin (quarter-final)
11. (China) Tian Houwei (semi-final)
12. (Indonesia) Simon Santoso (quarter-final)
13. (South Korea) Shon Wan-ho (third round)
14. (Chinese Taipei) Wan Chia-hsin (first round)
15. (China) Xue Song (second round)
16. (South Korea) Park Sung-min (third round)

=== Finals ===
Quarterfinals
(South Korea) Hong Ji-hoon	16	21	21
(South Korea) Han Ki-hoon	21	18	9
(South Korea) Hwang Jong-soo	21	21
Q3	(South Korea) Hwang Jung-woon	13	19
11	(China) Tian Houwei	13	21	21
10	(Malaysia) Iskandar Zulkarnain Zainuddin	21	9	14
Q8	(South Korea) Lee Hyun-il	21	21
12	(Indonesia) Simon Santoso	15	14

Semifinals
(South Korea) Hong Ji-hoon	21	22	21
(South Korea) Hwang Jong-soo	16	24	16
11	(China) Tian Houwei	18	17
Q8	(South Korea) Lee Hyun-il	21	21

Final
(South Korea) Hong Ji-hoon	18	12
Q8	(South Korea) Lee Hyun-il	21	21

=== Top half ===
==== Section 1 ====
First Round
1	(Chinese Taipei) Hsu J-h	21	20	21
(South Korea) Kim M-k	14	22	19
Q5	(China) Shi YQ	14	15
(South Korea) Hong J-h	21	21
13	(South Korea) Shon W-h	21	21
Q6	(South Korea) Rho Y-w	13	19
Q4	(South Korea) Jung H-m	21	5	21
(South Korea) Yim J-w	13	21	18

Second Round
1	(Chinese Taipei) Hsu J-h	19	13
(South Korea) Hong J-h	21	21
13	(South Korea) Shon W-h	21	21
Q4	(South Korea) Jung H-m	15	14

Third Round
(South Korea) Hong J-h	13	21	21
13	(South Korea) Shon W-h	21	17	14

==== Section 2 ====
First Round
6	(Malaysia) Z Zulkiffli	21	21
(South Korea) Yoon J-y	12	17
(South Korea) Han K-h	22	21
(Malaysia) Kuan BH	20	9
16	(South Korea) Park S-m	21	21
(Canada) T Chiu	13	13
(South Korea) Joo M-g	21	21
(Netherlands) N Fransman	8	12

Second Round
6	(Malaysia) Z Zulkiffli	19	10^{r}
(South Korea) Han K-h	21	15
16	(South Korea) Park S-m	21	21
(South Korea) Joo M-g	10	19

Third Round
(South Korea) Han K-h	21	19	21
16	(South Korea) Park S-m	13	21	15

==== Section 3 ====
First Round
4	(Indonesia) W Prasetyo	15	17
(Chinese Taipei) Yang C-h	21	21
(South Korea) Jung K-h	21	21
(Thailand) K Phetpradab	19	19
15	(China) Xue S	21	21
(South Korea) Jung S-h	15	11
(South Korea) Hwang J-s	21	21
Q1	(South Korea) Kim D-w	10	19

Second Round
(Chinese Taipei) Yang C-h	18	17
(South Korea) Jung K-h	21	21
15	(China) Xue S	12	14
(South Korea) Hwang J-s	21	21

Third Round
(South Korea) Jung K-h	15	14
(South Korea) Hwang J-s	21	21

==== Section 4 ====
First Round
7	(Israel) M Zilberman	22	21
(New Zealand) J Wu	20	10
(South Korea) Cho S-j	12	11
(Japan) K Nishimoto	21	21
9	(Czech Republic) P Koukal	21	23
(Chinese Taipei) Hsu S-w	17	21
Q3	(South Korea) Hwang J-w	21	20	21
(South Korea) Kim K-t	19	22	17

Second Round
7	(Israel) M Zilberman	14	12
(Japan) K Nishimoto	21	21
9	(Czech Republic) P Koukal	11	16
Q3	(South Korea) Hwang J-w	21	21

Third Round
(Japan) K Nishimoto	19	18
Q3	(South Korea) Hwang J-w	21	21

=== Bottom half ===
==== Section 5 ====
First Round
(Japan) A Koga	18	21	21
(South Korea) Lee H-j	21	18	19
(South Korea) Jang H-s	21	11	13
11	(China) Tian HW	19	21	21
(Uganda) E Ekiring	wo
(South Korea) Han S-y
(South Korea) Jang Y-s	13	22
8	(Japan) R Takeshita	21	24

Second Round
(Japan) A Koga	8	5
11	(China) Tian HW	21	21
(South Korea) Han S-y	10	13
8	(Japan) R Takeshita	21	21

Third Round
11	(China) Tian HW	23	21
8	(Japan) R Takeshita	21	17

==== Section 6 ====
First Round
(Thailand) P Thongnuam	16	21	21
(New Zealand) C Cheng	21	16	15
(South Korea) Jeon H-j	20	21	18
10	(Malaysia) I Zainuddin	22	17	21
(South Korea) Lee C-w	11	21	21
(Chinese Taipei) Lai C-c	21	15	14
(South Korea) Ha Y-w	18	21	25
3	(Malaysia) A Abdul Latif	21	18	23

Second Round
(Thailand) P Thongnuam	11	16
10	(Malaysia) I Zainuddin	21	21
(South Korea) Lee C-w	21	9	18
(South Korea) Ha Y-w	13	21	21

Third Round
10	(Malaysia) I Zainuddin	21	21
(South Korea) Ha Y-w	17	16

==== Section 7 ====
First Round
(Malaysia) Loh WS	21	21
(Netherlands) E Meijs	17	13
Q8	(South Korea) Lee H-i	21	21
14	(Chinese Taipei) Wan C-h	14	14
(South Korea) Kim D-h	21	21
Q7	(South Korea) Choi H-h	15	11
(Chinese Taipei) Hsu J-t	13	11
5	(Indonesia) R Subagja	21	21

Second Round
(Malaysia) Loh WS	10	8
Q8	(South Korea) Lee H-i	21	21
(South Korea) Kim D-h	21	18	21
5	(Indonesia) R Subagja	19	21	19

Third Round
Q8	(South Korea) Lee H-i	21	21
(South Korea) Kim D-h	13	11

==== Section 8 ====
First Round
(Canada) N Osborne	6	6
(South Korea) Heo K-h	21	21
(China) Huang YX	21	19	15
12	(Indonesia) S Santoso	19	21	21
(South Korea) Kim D-r	18	21	21
(Malaysia) H Hashim	21	15	7
Q2	(South Korea) Ahn S-s	11	17
2	(South Korea) Lee D-k	21	21

Second Round
(South Korea) Heo K-h	15	9
12	(Indonesia) S Santoso	21	21
(South Korea) Kim D-r	15	17
2	(South Korea) Lee D-k	21	21

Third Round
12	(Indonesia) S Santoso	21	21
2	(South Korea) Lee D-k	19	13

== Women's singles ==
=== Seeds ===
1. (South Korea) Sung Ji-hyun (final)
2. (South Korea) Bae Youn-joo (champion)
3. (Indonesia) Aprilia Yuswandari (second round)
4. (Chinese Taipei) Pai Hsiao-ma (second round)
5. (China) Deng Xuan (first round)
6. (Indonesia) Hera Desi (quarter-final)
7. (Indonesia) Maria Febe Kusumastuti (second round)
8. (China) Suo Di (quarter-final)

=== Finals ===
Semifinals
1	(South Korea) Sung Ji-hyun	21	21
(South Korea) Kim Hyo-min	13	14
Q1	(China) He Bingjiao	9	21	18
2	(South Korea) Bae Youn-joo	21	11	21

Final
1	(South Korea) Sung Ji-hyun	19	21	9
2	(South Korea) Bae Youn-joo	21	15	21

=== Top half ===
==== Section 1 ====
First Round
1	(South Korea) Sung J-h	21	21
Q3	(South Korea) Ko E-b	16	12
(Japan) S Uchida	15	21	21
(South Korea) Kim Y-j	21	19	14
8	(China) Suo D	16	21	21
(South Korea) Lee M-j	21	14	18
(South Korea) Lee J-m	18	21	21
(Lithuania) A Stapusaityte	21	16	13

Second Round
1	(South Korea) Sung J-h	21	21
(Japan) S Uchida	17	9
8	(China) Suo D	21	21
(South Korea) Lee J-m	13	14

Quarterfinals
1	(South Korea) Sung J-h	21	21
8	(China) Suo D	6	12

==== Section 2 ====
First Round
3	(Indonesia) A Yuswandari	21	21
PFQ	(South Korea) Ko H-j	14	17
PFQ	(South Korea) Jung Y-g	14	13
(South Korea) Kim H-m	21	21
7	(Indonesia) M Kusumastuti	21	21
(Chinese Taipei) Hsu Y-c	15	16
(Russia) E Dimova	14	21	7
(South Korea) Jung N-r	21	19	21

Second Round
3	(Indonesia) A Yuswandari	21	16	13
(South Korea) Kim H-m	18	21	21
7	(Indonesia) M Kusumastuti	18	21	13
(South Korea) Jung N-r	21	9	21

Quarterfinals
(South Korea) Kim H-m	21	21
(South Korea) Jung N-r	11	15

=== Bottom half ===
==== Section 3 ====
First Round
Q2	(Japan) M Nojirino	21	21
(Chinese Taipei) Lee C-h	14	12
Q1	(China) He BJ	21	14	21
5	(China) Deng X	15	21	9
(Japan) K Ito	16	21	21
(South Korea) Kim S-j	21	16	8
(Japan) A Mine	21	17	16
4	(Chinese Taipei) Pai H-m	19	21	21

Second Round
Q2	(Japan) M Nojirino	15	21
Q1	(China) He BJ	21	23
(Japan) K Ito	21	23
4	(Chinese Taipei) Pai H-m	13	21

Quarterfinals
Q1	(China) He BJ	21	21
(Japan) K Ito	10	14

==== Section 4 ====
First Round
(Japan) S Sato	21	21
(Chinese Taipei) Chen H-h	18	18
Q4	(Japan) S Hirota	18	10
6	(Indonesia) H Desi	21	21
(China) Hui XR	21	21
(South Korea) Kim N-y	6	12
(Thailand) P Chochuwong	10	14
2	(South Korea) Bae Y-j	21	21

Second Round
(Japan) S Sato	19	18
6	(Indonesia) H Desi	21	21
(China) Hui XR	19	14
2	(South Korea) Bae Y-j	21	21

Quarterfinals
6	(Indonesia) H Desi	10	19
2	(South Korea) Bae Y-j	21	21

== Men's doubles ==
=== Seeds ===
1. (South Korea) Kim Ki-jung / Kim Sa-rang (champion)
2. (Chinese Taipei) Liang Jui-wei / Liao Kuan-hao (second round)
3. (Netherlands) Ruud Bosch / Koen Ridder (first round)
4. (Malaysia) Gan Teik Chai / Ong Soon Hock (first round)
5. (South Korea) Lee Yong-dae / Yoo Yeon-seong (quarter-final)
6. (South Korea) Ko Sung-hyun / Shin Baek-cheol (final)
7. (Chinese Taipei) Chen Hung-ling / Lu Chia-bin (quarter-final)
8. (China) Shi Longfei / Wang Yilu (first round)

=== Finals ===
Semifinals
1	(South Korea) Kim Ki-jung (South Korea) Kim Sa-rang	21	21
(South Korea) Han To-sung (South Korea) Kim Duck-young	8	13
(South Korea) Choi Sol-kyu (South Korea) Kang Ji-wook	17	11
6	(South Korea) Ko Sung-hyun (South Korea) Shin Baek-cheol	21	21

Final
1	(South Korea) Kim Ki-jung (South Korea) Kim Sa-rang	21	18	25
6	(South Korea) Ko Sung-hyun (South Korea) Shin Baek-cheol	15	21	23

=== Top half ===
==== Section 1 ====
First Round
1	(South Korea) Kim K-j (South Korea) Kim S-r	21	21
(Chinese Taipei) Liao M-c (Chinese Taipei) Tseng M-h	20	10
(Indonesia) F Kurniawan (Indonesia) B Septano	21	11	21
(Chinese Taipei) Chang K-l (Chinese Taipei) Su Y-n	15	21	18
5	(South Korea) Lee Y-d (South Korea) Yoo Y-s	21	21
Q1	(South Korea) Chung E-s (South Korea) Jung Y-k	11	13
(South Korea) Jun B-c (South Korea) Kim D-s	21	21
(Chinese Taipei) Lai C-c (New Zealand) J Wu	9	8

Second Round
1	(South Korea) Kim K-j (South Korea) Kim S-r	21	24
(Indonesia) F Kurniawan (Indonesia) B Septano	8	22
5	(South Korea) Lee Y-d (South Korea) Yoo Y-s	21	21
(South Korea) Jun B-c (South Korea) Kim D-s	10	13

Quarterfinals
1	(South Korea) Kim K-j (South Korea) Kim S-r	11
5	(South Korea) Lee Y-d (South Korea) Yoo Y-s	9^{r}

==== Section 2 ====
First Round
4	(Malaysia) Gan TC (Malaysia) Ong SH	21	19	19
(South Korea) Han T-s (South Korea) Kim D-y	18	21	21
(Indonesia) Y Sugiarto (Indonesia) M Ulinnuha	21	21
(Chinese Taipei) Hsu J-t (Chinese Taipei) Tien J-c	14	17
7	(Chinese Taipei) Chen H-l (Chinese Taipei) Lu C-b	21	16	21
(Russia) E Dremin (Russia) S Lunev	12	21	12
(South Korea) Bae K-y (South Korea) Jung J-w	21	27
(Chinese Taipei) Liu W-c (Chinese Taipei) Yang P-h	16	25

Second Round
(South Korea) Han T-s (South Korea) Kim D-y	21	21
(Indonesia) Y Sugiarto (Indonesia) M Ulinnuha	17	14
7	(Chinese Taipei) Chen H-l (Chinese Taipei) Lu C-b	22	17	21
(South Korea) Bae K-y (South Korea) Jung J-w	20	21	9

Quarterfinals
(South Korea) Han T-s (South Korea) Kim D-y	14	21	21
7	(Chinese Taipei) Chen H-l (Chinese Taipei) Lu C-b	21	19	16

=== Bottom half ===
==== Section 3 ====
First Round
(Chinese Taipei) Hsu J-h (Chinese Taipei) Wan C-h	21	21
Q3	(South Korea) Kil H-c (South Korea) Ryu S-h	16	16
(South Korea) Choi S-k (South Korea) Kang J-w	20	21	21
8	(China) Shi LF (China) Wang YL	22	17	10
(Indonesia) Hardianto (Indonesia) A Putra	18	16
(Singapore) D Chrisnanta (Singapore) C Triyachart	21	21
(South Korea) Kim D-e (South Korea) Lee S-j	21	16	21
3	(Netherlands) R Bosch (Netherlands) K Ridder	17	21	14

Second Round
(Chinese Taipei) Hsu J-h (Chinese Taipei) Wan C-h	16	10
(South Korea) Choi S-k (South Korea) Kang J-w	21	21
(Singapore) D Chrisnanta (Singapore) C Triyachart	21	15	17
(South Korea) Kim D-e (South Korea) Lee S-j	18	21	21

Quarterfinals
(South Korea) Choi S-k (South Korea) Kang J-w	21	21
(South Korea) Kim D-e (South Korea) Lee S-j	13	16

==== Section 4 ====
First Round
(Malaysia) R Abdul Latif (Malaysia) H Hashim	21	21
Q2	(South Korea) Ahn S-s (South Korea) Lee J-w	18	11
(Chinese Taipei) Lin Y-j (Chinese Taipei) Wang C-h	10	11
6	(South Korea) Ko S-h (South Korea) Shin B-c	21	21
(Malaysia) A Abdul Latif (Malaysia) V Mawan	16	11^{r}
(South Korea) Cho G-w (South Korea) Han S-h	21	16
Q4	(South Korea) Han K-s (South Korea) Kim D-j	16	21	15
2	(Chinese Taipei) Liang J-w (Chinese Taipei) Liao K-h	21	18	21

Second Round
(Malaysia) R Abdul Latif (Malaysia) H Hashim	13	10
6	(South Korea) Ko S-h (South Korea) Shin B-c	21	21
(South Korea) Cho G-w (South Korea) Han S-h	22	15	21
2	(Chinese Taipei) Liang J-w (Chinese Taipei) Liao K-h	20	21	16

Quarterfinals
6	(South Korea) Ko S-h (South Korea) Shin B-c	21	21
(South Korea) Cho G-w (South Korea) Han S-h	15	18

== Women's doubles ==
=== Seeds ===
1. (South Korea) Jung Kyung-eun / Kim Ha-na (second round)
2. (South Korea) Ko A-ra / Yoo Hae-won (final)
3. (Singapore) Shinta Mulia Sari / Yao Lei (semi-final)
4. (South Korea) Jang Ye-na / Kim So-young (champion)

=== Finals ===
Semifinals
(South Korea) Chae Yoo-jung (South Korea) Kim Ji-won	20	9
4	(South Korea) Jang Ye-na (South Korea) Kim So-young	21	21
3	(Singapore) Shinta Mulia Sari (Singapore) Yao Lei	16	17
2	(South Korea) Ko A-ra (South Korea) Yoo Hae-won	21	21

Final
4	(South Korea) Jang Ye-na (South Korea) Kim So-young	21	21
2	(South Korea) Ko A-ra (South Korea) Yoo Hae-won	15	12

=== Top half ===
==== Section 1 ====
First Round
1	(South Korea) Jung K-e (South Korea) Kim H-n
BYE
(Singapore) Fu MT (Singapore) V Neo	11
(South Korea) Kim M-j (South Korea) Yoon S-b	4^{r}
(South Korea) Chae Y-j (South Korea) Kim J-w
BYE
(South Korea) Kim S-b (South Korea) Lee S-r	21	21
(Chinese Taipei) Huang M-c (Chinese Taipei) Liu S-c	12	19

Second Round
1	(South Korea) Jung K-e (South Korea) Kim H-n	wo
(Singapore) Fu MT (Singapore) V Neo
(South Korea) Chae Y-j (South Korea) Kim J-w	21	21
(South Korea) Kim S-b (South Korea) Lee S-r	12	17

Quarterfinals
(Singapore) Fu MT (Singapore) V Neo	21	15	16
(South Korea) Chae Y-j (South Korea) Kim J-w	18	21	21

==== Section 2 ====
First Round
4	(South Korea) Jang Y-n (South Korea) Kim S-y
BYE
(South Korea) Kim M-s (South Korea) Park S-r	21	21
(Thailand) P Chochuwong (Thailand) C Teachavorasinskun	6	7
(Indonesia) M Giovani (Indonesia) M Oklamona	11	13
(Japan) A Kugo (Japan) Y Miyauchi	21	21
(China) Huang YQ (China) Xia H	21	21
(South Korea) Lee E-a (South Korea) Lee I-j	12	10

Second Round
4	(South Korea) Jang Y-n (South Korea) Kim S-y	21	21
(South Korea) Kim M-s (South Korea) Park S-r	12	15
(Japan) A Kugo (Japan) Y Miyauchi	10	14
(China) Huang YQ (China) Xia H	21	21

Quarterfinals
4	(South Korea) Jang Y-n (South Korea) Kim S-y	21	21
(China) Huang YQ (China) Xia H	16	19

=== Bottom half ===
==== Section 3 ====
First Round
(Chinese Taipei) Chen H-h (Chinese Taipei) Lai C-w	21	21
(South Korea) Song K-b (South Korea) Park H-j	14	2
(South Korea) Kang G-h (South Korea) Kim C-m	10	21	16
(Japan) Y Fukushima (Japan) S Hirota	21	16	21
(Chinese Taipei) Lee C-h (Chinese Taipei) Wu T-j	19	20
(South Korea) Han G-h (South Korea) Jung N-r	21	22
BYE
3	(Singapore) S Sari (Singapore) Yao L

Second Round
(Chinese Taipei) Chen H-h (Chinese Taipei) Lai C-w	18	17
(Japan) Y Fukushima (Japan) S Hirota	21	21
(South Korea) Han G-h (South Korea) Jung N-r	6	14
3	(Singapore) S Sari (Singapore) Yao L	21	21

Quarterfinals
(Japan) Y Fukushima (Japan) S Hirota	19	23	15
3	(Singapore) S Sari (Singapore) Yao L	21	21	21

==== Section 4 ====
First Round
(South Korea) Choi H-i (South Korea) Park S-y
(Indonesia) A Agustin (Indonesia) R Amelia	wo
BYE
(South Korea) Eom H-w (South Korea) Shin S-c
(South Korea) Kim C-h (South Korea) Kim N-y	7	12
(Thailand) J Kittiharakul (Thailand) R Prajongjai	21	21
BYE
2	(South Korea) Ko A-r (South Korea) Yoo H-w

Second Round
(South Korea) Choi H-i (South Korea) Park S-y
(South Korea) Eom H-w (South Korea) Shin S-c	wo
(Thailand) J Kittiharakul (Thailand) R Prajongjai	10	16
2	(South Korea) Ko A-r (South Korea) Yoo H-w	21	21

Quarterfinals
(South Korea) Choi H-i (South Korea) Park S-y	21	18	9
2	(South Korea) Ko A-r (South Korea) Yoo H-w	12	21	21

== Mixed doubles ==
=== Seeds ===
1. (Singapore) Danny Bawa Chrisnanta / Vanessa Neo Yu Yan (first round)
2. (South Korea) Shin Baek-cheol / Eom Hye-won (first round)
3. (South Korea) Ko Sung-hyun / Kim Ha-na (first round)
4. (Indonesia) Irfan Fadhilah / Weni Anggraini (semi-final)
5. (South Korea) Yoo Yeon-seong / Jang Ye-na (champion)
6. (Malaysia) Tan Aik Quan / Lai Pei Jing (first round)
7. (South Korea) Kim Ki-jung / Kim So-young (semi-final)
8. (Indonesia) Lukhi Apri Nugroho / Annisa Saufika (first round)

=== Finals ===
Semifinals
7	(South Korea) Kim Ki-jung (South Korea) Kim So-young	14	21	14
(South Korea) Kang Ji-wook (South Korea) Choi Hye-in	21	19	21
4	(Indonesia) Irfan Fadhilah (Indonesia) Weni Anggraini	19	14
5	(South Korea) Yoo Yeon-seong (South Korea) Jang Ye-na	21	21

Final
(South Korea) Kang Ji-wook (South Korea) Choi Hye-in	13	11
5	(South Korea) Yoo Yeon-seong (South Korea) Jang Ye-na	21	21

=== Top half ===
==== Section 1 ====
First Round
1	(Singapore) D Chrisnanta (Singapore) V Neo	11	21	19
(South Korea) Choi S-k (South Korea) Chae Y-j	21	18	21
(South Korea) Lee Y-d (South Korea) Shin S-c	14	19
(Chinese Taipei) Liao M-c (Chinese Taipei) Chen H-h	21	21
7	(South Korea) Kim K-j (South Korea) Kim S-y	21	21
(Chinese Taipei) Liang J-w (Chinese Taipei) Wu T-j	15	16
(South Korea) Lee S-j (South Korea) Yoo H-w	21	22
Q4	(South Korea) Kim D-s (South Korea) Kim J-w	17	20

Second Round
(South Korea) Choi S-k (South Korea) Chae Y-j	21	21
(Chinese Taipei) Liao M-c (Chinese Taipei) Chen H-h	12	19
7	(South Korea) Kim K-j (South Korea) Kim S-y	25	22
(South Korea) Lee S-j (South Korea) Yoo H-w	23	20

Quarterfinals
(South Korea) Choi S-k (South Korea) Chae Y-j	21	9	17
7	(South Korea) Kim K-j (South Korea) Kim S-y	11	21	21

==== Section 2 ====
First Round
3	(South Korea) Ko S-h (South Korea) Kim H-n	3^{r}
(Russia) E Dremin (Russia) E Dimova	5
(China) Wang YL (China) Huang YQ	21	21
(Chinese Taipei) Tseng M-h (Chinese Taipei) Lai C-w	17	15
8	(Indonesia) L Nugroho (Indonesia) A Saufika	17	11
(South Korea) Kang J-w (South Korea) Choi H-i	21	21
Q2	(South Korea) Han T-s (South Korea) Lee E-a	14	14
Q3	(South Korea) Jung J-w (South Korea) Kim C-h	21	21

Second Round
(Russia) E Dremin (Russia) E Dimova	17	14
(China) Wang YL (China) Huang YQ	21	21
(South Korea) Kang J-w (South Korea) Choi H-i	21	21
Q3	(South Korea) Jung J-w (South Korea) Kim C-h	17	14

Quarterfinals
(China) Wang YL (China) Huang YQ	19	21	15
(South Korea) Kang J-w (South Korea) Choi H-i	21	18	21

=== Bottom half ===
==== Section 3 ====
First Round
(Canada) N Osborne (Canada) G Gao	18	20
(Indonesia) E Subaktiar (Indonesia) G Widjaja	21	22
(Chinese Taipei) Liao K-h (Chinese Taipei) Pai H-m	21	21
6	(Malaysia) Tan AQ (Malaysia) Lai PJ	8	7
(Indonesia) R Alexander (Indonesia) D Susanto	21	16	21
(Thailand) W Uttamang (Thailand) J Kittiharakul	15	21	16
(South Korea) Jang S-h (South Korea) Ko H-j	12	15
4	(Indonesia) I Fadhilah (Indonesia) W Anggraini	21	21

Second Round
(Indonesia) E Subaktiar (Indonesia) G Widjaja	22	21
(Chinese Taipei) Liao K-h (Chinese Taipei) Pai H-m	20	11
(Indonesia) R Alexander (Indonesia) D Susanto	15	18
4	(Indonesia) I Fadhilah (Indonesia) W Anggraini	21	21

Quarterfinals
(Indonesia) E Subaktiar (Indonesia) G Widjaja	16	14
4	(Indonesia) I Fadhilah (Indonesia) W Anggraini	21	21

==== Section 4 ====
First Round
(Singapore) C Triyachart (Singapore) Yao L	21	19	21
(South Korea) Kim D-e (South Korea) Ko A-r	19	21	12
(Singapore) T Yeo (Singapore) S Sari	11	18
5	(South Korea) Yoo Y-s (South Korea) Jang Y-n	21	21
(Chinese Taipei) Chen H-l (Chinese Taipei) Lee C-h	21	21
Q1	(South Korea) Bae K-y (South Korea) Park S-y	13	15
(China) Shi LF (China) Xia H	11
2	(South Korea) Shin B-c (South Korea) Eom H-w	3^{r}

Second Round
(Singapore) C Triyachart (Singapore) Yao L	10	21	9
5	(South Korea) Yoo Y-s (South Korea) Jang Y-n	21	12	21
(Chinese Taipei) Chen H-l (Chinese Taipei) Lee C-h	21	21
(China) Shi LF (China) Xia H	14	11

Quarterfinals
5	(South Korea) Yoo Y-s (South Korea) Jang Y-n	21	21
(Chinese Taipei) Chen H-l (Chinese Taipei) Lee C-h	9	10

Preceded by 2013 Bitburger Open Grand Prix Gold	BWF Grand Prix Gold and Grand Prix; 2013 season	Succeeded by 2013 Scottish Open Grand Prix
