= 2004 IBF World Junior Championships – boys' singles =

2004 IBF World Junior Championships boys' Singles
Tournament details
- Dates: 25 October 2004 – 30 October 2004
- Edition: 7th
- Level: International
- Venue: Minoru Arena
- Location: Richmond, Canada

The boys' singles event for the 2004 IBF World Junior Championships was held between 25 October and 30 October. Chen Jin defended his title from the last edition in 2002.

== Seeds ==
1. (China) Chen Jin (champion)
2. (China) Gong Weijie (final)
3. (South Korea) Hwang Jung-hoon (semi-final)
4. (South Korea) Lee Cheol-ho (semi-final)
5. (China) Chen Tianyu (quarter-final)
6. (South Korea) Han Ki-hoon (third round)
7. (South Korea) Hong Ji-hoon (fourth round)
8. (China) Lu Qicheng (quarter-final)
9. (Malaysia) Azrihanif Azahar (fourth round)
10. (Chinese Taipei) Chu Han-chou (second round)
11. (India) Anand Pawar (second round)
12. (Japan) Jun Tamura (third round)
13. (Singapore) Aaron Tan (third round)
14. (Thailand) Sittichai Viboonsin (quarter-final)
15. (Indonesia) Ari Yuli Wahyu (second round)
16. (Indonesia) Markus Wijanu (third round)

== Draw ==
=== Finals ===
Quarterfinals
1	(China) Chen Jin	15	15
9/16	(Thailand) Sittichai Viboonsin	1	1
3/4	(South Korea) Hwang Jung-woon	15	15
5/8	(China) Lu Qicheng	10	6
5/8	(China) Chen Tianyu	5	10
3/4	(South Korea) Lee Cheol-ho	15	15
(Malaysia) Chong Wei Feng	7	3
2	(China) Gong Weijie	15	15

Semifinals
1	(China) Chen Jin	15	15
3/4	(South Korea) Hwang Jung-woon	1	4
3/4	(South Korea) Lee Cheol-ho	15	9	2
2	(China) Gong Weijie	8	15	15

Final
1	(China) Chen Jin	12	15	17
2	(China) Gong Weijie	15	8	14

=== Top half ===
==== Section 1 ====
First round
(Russia) M Danchenko	15	15
(Nigeria) O Elewa	3	6
(Sweden) M Wigardt	15	15
(Japan) M Takeuchi	11	4

Second round
1	(China) Chen J	15	15
(Czech Republic) T Kopřiva	2	2
(Malaysia) KK Ananthakrishnan	15	15
(Russia) M Danchenko	2	8
9/16	(India) A Pawar	6	6
(Indonesia) T Sugiarto	15	15
(Indonesia) A Rivai	15	10	15
(Sweden) M Wigardt	10	15	11

Third round
1	(China) Chen J	15	15
(Malaysia) KK Ananthakrishnan	7	2
(Indonesia) T Sugiarto	15	15
(Indonesia) A Rivai	13	5

Fourth round
1	(China) Chen J	15	15
(Indonesia) T Sugiarto	2	3

==== Section 2 ====
First round
(England) R Ouseph	15	7	13
(Hong Kong) Wong WH	9	15	15
(Russia) K Khlestov	15	15
(Peru) A de Vinatea	7	4
(Malaysia) Tan CS	15	15
(Slovenia) I Utroša	0	0

Second round
5/8	(South Korea) Han K-h	15	15
(Portugal) A Paixão	12	6
(United States) T Blanchet	0	2
(Hong Kong) Wong WH	15	15
9/16	(Thailand) S Viboonsin	17	15
(Belgium) Y Tan	14	13
(Russia) K Khlestov	3	9
(Malaysia) Tan CS	15	15

Third round
5/8	(South Korea) Han K-h	6	16
(Hong Kong) Wong WH	15	17
9/16	(Thailand) S Viboonsin	15	15
(Malaysia) Tan CS	12	10

Fourth round
(Hong Kong) Wong WH	15	12	6
9/16	(Thailand) S Viboonsin	9	15	15

==== Section 3 ====
First round
(Chinese Taipei) Su T-b	5	5
(Denmark) H Vittinghus	15	15
(Singapore) Chew SH	15	15
(Canada) R Liang	9	10

Second round
3/4	(South Korea) Hwang J-w	15	15
(India) S Chopda	5	5
(Japan) K Oshima	11	8
(Denmark) H Vittinghus	15	15
9/16	(Indonesia) A Wahyu	7	13
(Germany) D Domke	15	15
(Canada) A Pang	15	5	9
(Singapore) Chew SH	4	15	15

Third round
3/4	(South Korea) Hwang J-w	15	14	15
(Denmark) H Vittinghus	11	17	8
(Germany) D Domke	17	15
(Singapore) Chew SH	14	5

Fourth round
3/4	(South Korea) Hwang J-w	15	15
(Germany) D Domke	3	9

==== Section 4 ====
First round
(Canada) B Dejong
(Jamaica) S Forrester	WO
(Guatemala) R Ramírez	15	3	14
(Slovenia) R Cinc	13	15	15
(Singapore) D Wong
(Jamaica) N Robinson	WO

Second round
5/8	(China) Lu QC	15	15
(United States) A Ali	2	2
(Nigeria) K Omoruyi	9	10
(Canada) B Dejong	15	15
9/16	(Malaysia) A Azahar	15	15
(Netherlands) J de Ruiter	8	8
(Slovenia) R Cinc	5	8
(Singapore) D Wong	15	15

Third round
5/8	(China) Lu QC	15	15
(Canada) B Dejong	6	7
9/16	(Malaysia) A Azahar	15	15
(Singapore) D Wong	2	10

Fourth round
5/8	(China) Lu QC	15	15
9/16	(Malaysia) A Azahar	10	3

=== Bottom half ===
==== Section 5 ====
First round
(Canada) C Lee	15	15
(Germany) T Zander	9	5
(Jamaica) V Tolan	WO
(Denmark) U Nielsen
(Mexico) J Aguilar	6	12
(Peru) S Salazar	15	15

Second round
(Canada) C Lee	8	7
(Denmark) U Nielsen	15	15
(Croatia) N Rihtar	9	8
9/16	(Japan) J Tamura	15	15
(Peru) S Salazar	9	10
(Czech Republic) P Florián	15	15
(India) K Parupalli	WO
5/8	(China) Chen TY

Third round
(Denmark) U Nielsen	8	15	15
9/16	(Japan) J Tamura	15	12	10
(Czech Republic) P Florián	4	0
5/8	(China) Chen TY	15	15

Fourth round
(Denmark) U Nielsen	9	15	8
5/8	(China) Chen TY	15	13	15

==== Section 6 ====
First round
(Hong Kong) Hui WH
(Nigeria) J Bulus	WO
(Netherlands) L Oey	7	8
(Russia) V Malkov	15	15
(Peru) M del Valle	15	15
(United States) A Todt	12	9

Second round
(Hong Kong) Hui WH	12	7
(Russia) V Malkov	15	15
(India) J Sanyal	15	11	15
9/16	(Chinese Taipei) Chu H-C	8	15	4
(Peru) M del Valle	4	7
(Hong Kong) Lau CY	15	15
(Germany) J Schulz	4	5
3/4	(South Korea) Lee C-h	15	15

Third round
(Russia) V Malkov	15	15
(India) J Sanyal	12	12
(Hong Kong) Lau CY	6	2
3/4	(South Korea) Lee C-h	15	15

Fourth round
(Russia) V Malkov	8	14
3/4	(South Korea) Lee C-h	15	17

==== Section 7 ====
First round
(Sweden) H Hurskainen	WO
(Russia) V Ivanov
(Chinese Taipei) Sy S-w	8	12
(Malaysia) Chong WF	15	15
(United States) S Ali	6	1
(Slovenia) N Boljka	15	15

Second round
(Russia) V Ivanov	5	7
(Malaysia) Chong WF	15	15
(Nigeria) A Otagada	7	11
9/16	(Indonesia) M Wijanu	15	15
(Slovenia) N Boljka	9	4
(Thailand) T Huansuriya	15	15
(Estonia) R Must	7	5
5/8	(South Korea) Hong J-h	15	15

Third round
(Malaysia) Chong WF	17	15
9/16	(Indonesia) M Wijanu	15	5
(Thailand) T Huansuriya	0	6
5/8	(South Korea) Hong J-h	15	15

Fourth round
(Malaysia) Chong WF	17	15
5/8	(South Korea) Hong J-h	14	10

==== Section 8 ====
First round
(Hong Kong) Leung CY	11	10
(Sweden) T Foo	15	15
(Guatemala) K Cordón	15	15
(England) T Dunlop	13	7

Second round
(Sweden) T Foo	6	9
(Chinese Taipei) Feng C-h	15	15
(Germany) D Nyenhuis	15	11	10
9/16	(Singapore) A Tan	11	15	15
(Guatemala) K Cordón	13	15	15
(Japan) M Nasuka	15	8	10
(Netherlands) S Afif	3	4
2	(China) Gong WJ	15	15

Third round
(Chinese Taipei) Feng C-h	15	15
9/16	(Singapore) A Tan	3	3
(Guatemala) K Cordón	7	9
2	(China) Gong WJ	15	15

Fourth round
(Chinese Taipei) Feng C-h	7	14
2	(China) Gong WJ	15	17
