= 2010 BWF World Championships – Men's singles =

Badminton championships

Men's singles at the 2010 BWF World Championships
- Venue: Stade Pierre de Coubertin
- Location: Paris, France
- Dates: August 23, 2010 – August 29, 2010

Medalists
gold medal	Chen Jin	China
silver medal	Taufik Hidayat	Indonesia
bronze medal	Park Sung-hwan	South Korea
bronze medal	Peter Gade	Denmark

The 2010 BWF World Championships was the 18th tournament of the World Badminton Championships. It was held at Stade Pierre de Coubertin in Paris, France, from August 23 to August 29, 2010. Following are the results of the men's singles:

== Seeds ==
1. (Malaysia) Lee Chong Wei (quarterfinals)
2. (Denmark) Peter Gade (semifinals)
3. (China) Lin Dan (quarterfinals)
4. (China) Chen Jin (champion)
5. (Indonesia) Taufik Hidayat (finalist)
6. (Indonesia) Sony Dwi Kuncoro (first round, retired)
7. (Vietnam) Nguyen Tien Minh (third round)
8. (Indonesia) Simon Santoso (second round)
9. (Thailand) Boonsak Ponsana (third round)
10. (China) Bao Chunlai (third round)
11. (Denmark) Jan Ø. Jørgensen (second round)
12. (Japan) Kenichi Tago (second round)
13. (South Korea) Park Sung-hwan (semifinals)
14. (India) Chetan Anand (first round)
15. (Germany) Marc Zwiebler (third round)
16. (Malaysia) Wong Choong Hann (second round)

== Main stage ==
=== Section 1 ===
First round
1	(Malaysia) Lee CW	21	21
(Guatemala) K Cordón	7	11
(Malaysia) MH Hashim	21	21
(Belgium) Y Tan	13	15
11	(Denmark) JO Jorgensen	21	21
(Austria) M Lahnsteiner	12	19
(Netherlands) E Pang	19	21	21
(England) R Ouseph	21	15	23
5	(Indonesia) T Hidayat	21	21
(Nigeria) O Fagbemi	10	10
(Portugal) P Martins	20	17
(Chinese Taipei) Hsieh Y-h	22	21
12	(Japan) K Tago	21	24
(Czech Republic) P Koukal	19	22
(Thailand) T Saensomboonsuk	14	21	21
(India) K Parupalli	21	14	16

Second round
1	(Malaysia) Lee CW	21	21
(Malaysia) MH Hashim	16	16
11	(Denmark) JO Jorgensen	12	23
(England) R Ouseph	21	25
5	(Indonesia) T Hidayat	19	21	21
(Chinese Taipei) Hsieh Y-h	21	19	9
12	(Japan) K Tago	20	19
(Thailand) T Saensomboonsuk	22	21

Third round
1	(Malaysia) Lee CW	21	21
(England) R Ouseph	9	9
5	(Indonesia) T Hidayat	21	21
(Thailand) T Saensomboonsuk	8	14

Quarterfinals
1	(Malaysia) Lee CW	15	21	12
5	(Indonesia) T Hidayat	21	11	21

=== Section 2 ===
First round
3	(China) Lin D	21	21
(Iran) A Shahhosseini	4	10
(Hungary) H Toth	13	16
(Sweden) H Hurskainen	21	21
10	(China) Bao CL	21	21
(Hong Kong) Chan YK	11	17
(Canada) D Snider	21	21
(Scotland) A Casey	16	15
7	(Vietnam) Nguyen TM	21	21
(Ukraine) V Atrashchenkov	16	14
(Estonia) R Must	21	16	21
(Germany) D Domke	16	21	18
13	(South Korea) Park S-h	21	21
(Singapore) D Wong	9	18
(France) M Lo Ying Ping	17	13
(Russia) V Ivanov	21	21

Second round
3	(China) Lin D	21	21
(Sweden) H Hurskainen	13	15
10	(China) Bao CL	21	21
(Canada) D Snider	13	13
7	(Vietnam) Nguyen TM	21	21
(Estonia) R Must	14	10
13	(South Korea) Park S-h	21	21
(Russia) V Ivanov	16	13

Third round
3	(China) Lin D	21	21
10	(China) Bao CL	16	13
7	(Vietnam) Nguyen TM	15	14
13	(South Korea) Park S-h	21	21

Quarterfinals
3	(China) Lin D	13	13
13	(South Korea) Park S-h	21	21

=== Section 3 ===
First round
(England) C Baxter	21	21
(Slovakia) M Matejka	10	12
(Russia) V Malkov	6	6
9	(Thailand) B Ponsana	21	21
(Republic of Ireland) S Evans	16	14
(Chinese Taipei) Hsueh H-y	21	21
(Poland) P Wacha	11	17
8	(Indonesia) S Santoso	21	21
(Canada) S Wojcikiewicz	21	21
(Ukraine) D Zavadsky	18	19
(Singapore) A Chen	21	21
14	(India) C Anand	14	18
(Scotland) K Merrilees	21	13	14
(Lithuania) K Navickas	15	21	21
(Finland) V Lang	14	14
4	(China) Chen J	21	21

Second round
(England) C Baxter	18	17
9	(Thailand) B Ponsana	21	21
(Chinese Taipei) Hsueh H-y
8	(Indonesia) S Santoso	wo
(Canada) S Wojciekiewicz	16	21	17
(Singapore) A Chen	21	14	21
(Lithuania) K Navickas	16	16
4	(China) Chen J	21	21

Third round
9	(Thailand) B Ponsana	13	11
(Chinese Taipei) Hsueh H-y	21	21
(Singapore) A Chen	17	10
4	(China) Chen J	21	21

Quarterfinals
(Chinese Taipei) Hsueh H-y	24	5	13
4	(China) Chen J	22	21	21

=== Section 4 ===
First round
(Japan) K Yamada	21	21
(Iran) K Mehrabi	13	19
(France) S Maunoury	18	21	17
16	(Malaysia) Wong CH	21	10	21
(Netherlands) D Palyama	21	21
(France) B Leverdez	16	15
(Israel) M Zilberman
6	(Indonesia) SD Kuncoro	wo
(Sweden) M Sahlberg	16	15
(Spain) P Abian	21	21
(Czech Republic) J Vondra	14	12
15	(Germany) M Zwiebler	21	21
(Hong Kong) Hu Y	18	13
(South Korea) Shon W-h	21	21
(Brazil) D Paiola	10	7
2	(Denmark) P Gade	21	21

Second round
(Japan) K Yamada	17	21	21
16	(Malaysia) Wong CH	21	16	18
(Netherlands) D Palyama	21	21
(Israel) M Zilberman	9	13
(Spain) P Abian	13	17
15	(Germany) M Zwiebler	21	21
(South Korea) Shon W-h	23	21	18
2	(Denmark) P Gade	25	7	21

Third round
(Japan) K Yamada	14	21	21
(Netherlands) D Palyama	21	19	11
15	(Germany) M Zwiebler	14	15
2	(Denmark) P Gade	21	21

Quarterfinals
(Japan) K Yamada	19	12
2	(Denmark) P Gade	21	21

== Final stage ==
Quarterfinals
1	(Malaysia) Lee Chong Wei	15	21	12
5	(Indonesia) Taufik Hidayat	21	11	21
3	(China) Lin Dan	13	13
13	(South Korea) Park Sung-hwan	21	21
(Chinese Taipei) Hsueh Hsuan-yi	24	5	13
4	(China) Chen Jin	22	21	21
(Japan) Kazushi Yamada	19	12
2	(Denmark) Peter Gade	21	21

Semifinals
5	(Indonesia) Taufik Hidayat	21	22
13	(South Korea) Park Sung-hwan	10	20
4	(China) Chen Jin	19	21	21
2	(Denmark) Peter Gade	21	8	11

Finals
5	(Indonesia) Taufik Hidayat	13	15
4	(China) Chen Jin	21	21
