= Monika Fašungová =

Slovak badminton player (born 1988)

Personal information
- Born: 9 April 1988 (age 38) Bratislava, Slovakia
- Height: 1.63 m (5 ft 4 in)
- Weight: 55 kg (121 lb)

Sport
- Country: Slovakia
- Sport: Badminton
- Handedness: Right

Women's
- Highest ranking: 93 (WS) 16 November 2012; 139 (WD) 12 November 2009; 63 (XD) 13 September 2012
- BWF profile

Monika Fašungová (born 9 April 1988, Bratislava) is a Slovak badminton player. She started playing badminton in 2001, and joined the national team in 2005. In 2009, she won her first national champion in the women's singles event. She competed for Slovakia at the 2012 Summer Olympics.

== Achievements ==
=== BWF International Challenge/Series ===
Women's singles

Year	Tournament	Opponent	Score	Result
2011	Internacional Mexicano	(Mexico) Victoria Montero	No match	(silver) Runner-up
2010	Mongolia International	(Mongolia) Gerelmaa Batchuluun	21–10, 21–2	(gold) Winner
2009	Mongolia International	(Mauritius) Karen Foo Kune	18–21, 21–12, 21–15	(gold) Winner

Women's doubles

Year	Tournament	Partner	Opponent	Score	Result
2010	Mongolia International	(Mongolia) Gerelmaa Batchuluun	(Mongolia) Khulangoo Baatar (Mongolia) Munkhchimeg Mendjargal	21–15, 21–15	(gold) Winner
2009	Mongolia International	(Mongolia) Dulamsuren Munkhbayar	(Mongolia) Gerelmaa Batchuluun (Mongolia) Dolgorsuren Batsaikhan		(gold) Winner

Mixed doubles

Year	Tournament	Partner	Opponent	Score	Result
2010	Mongolia International	(Slovakia) Michal Matejka	(Mongolia) Enkhbat Olonbayar (Mongolia) Gerelmaa Batchuluun	21–14, 21–16	(gold) Winner
2009	Mongolia International	(Slovakia) Michal Matejka	(Mongolia) Enkhbat Olonbayar (Mongolia) Gerelmaa Batchuluun	20–22, 21–12, 21–14	(gold) Winner

BWF International Challenge tournament
BWF International Series tournament
