= Lee Cheol-ho =

South Korean badminton player (born 1986)

Personal information
- Born: 20 September 1986 (age 40) Hwasun County, South Korea

Sport
- Country: South Korea
- Sport: Badminton

Men's singles & doubles
- Highest ranking: 75 (MS 29 October 2009); 381 (MD 2 June 2016)
- BWF profile
Medal record
Men's badminton
Representing South Korea
Sudirman Cup
| Bronze medal – third place | 2007 Glasgow | Mixed team |
| Bronze medal – third place | 2005 Beijing | Mixed team |
World Junior Championships
| Silver medal – second place | 2004 Richmond | Mixed team |
| Bronze medal – third place | 2004 Richmond | Boys' singles |
Asia Junior Championships
| Silver medal – second place | 2004 Hwacheon | Boys' team |
| Bronze medal – third place | 2004 Hwacheon | Boys' singles |

- Lee Cheol-ho
- Hangul: 이철호
- RR: I Cheolho
- MR: I Ch'ŏrho

Lee Cheol-ho (Korean: 이철호; born 20 September 1986) is a South Korean badminton player. In 2004, he reach the semi-final round in the boys' singles event at the Richmond World Junior Championships and Hwacheon Asian Junior Championships and settle for the bronze medal. At the senior event, he won the 2006 India Satellite, 2009 Osaka International Challenge and 2015 Apacs Mongolia International Series tournament.

== Achievements ==
=== IBF World Junior Championships ===
Boys' singles
| Year | Venue | Opponent | Score | Result |
|---|---|---|---|---|
| 2004 | Minoru Arena; Richmond, Canada | (China) Gong Weijie | 15–8, 9–15, 2–15 | Bronze |

=== Asian Junior Championships ===
Boys' singles
| Year | Venue | Opponent | Score | Result |
|---|---|---|---|---|
| 2004 | Hwacheon Indoor Stadium; Hwacheon, South Korea | (China) Gong Weijie | 7–15, 11–15 | Bronze |

=== BWF International Challenge/Series ===
Men's singles
| Year | Tournament | Opponent | Score | Result |
|---|---|---|---|---|
| 2015 | Mongolia International | (South Korea) Rho Ye-wook | 21–17, 21–19 | (gold) Winner |
| 2009 | Osaka International | (South Korea) Shon Wan-ho | 19–21, 21–11, 21–11 | (gold) Winner |
| 2008 | Korea International | (South Korea) Park Sung-hwan | 14–21, 13–21 | (silver) Runner-up |
| 2006 | India Satellite | (India) Nikhil Kanetkar | 21–11, 21–11 | (gold) Winner |

Men's doubles
| Year | Tournament | Partner | Opponent | Score | Result |
|---|---|---|---|---|---|
| 2015 | Mongolia International | (South Korea) Jin Yong-hoon | (South Korea) Kim Dae-sung (South Korea) Kim Young-sun | 15–21, 11–21 | (silver) Runner-up |

BWF International Challenge tournament
BWF International Series tournament
BWF Future Series tournament
