= Badminton at the 2010 Asian Games – Men's team =

Men's team at the 2010 Asian Games
- Venue: Tianhe Gymnasium
- Dates: 13–15 November
- Competitors: 85 from 10 nations

Medalists
gold medal	China; Bao Chunlai, Cai Yun, Chen Jin, Chen Long, Fu Haifeng, Guo Zhendong, He Hanbin, Lin Dan, Xu Chen, Zhang Nan
silver medal	South Korea; Hong Ji-hoon, Jung Jae-sung, Kim Gi-jung, Ko Sung-hyun, Lee Hyun-il, Lee Yong-dae, Park Sung-hwan, Shin Baek-cheol, Son Wan-ho, Yoo Yeon-seong
bronze medal	Indonesia; Tontowi Ahmad, Mohammad Ahsan, Taufik Hidayat, Markis Kido, Sony Dwi Kuncoro, Fran Kurniawan, Dionysius Hayom Rumbaka, Simon Santoso, Hendra Setiawan, Alvent Yulianto
bronze medal	Thailand; Songphon Anugritayawon, Suppanyu Avihingsanon, Pollawat Boonpan, Bodin Isara, Maneepong Jongjit, Thitipong Lapho, Boonsak Ponsana, Sudket Prapakamol, Tanongsak Saensomboonsuk, Pakkawat Vilailak

The badminton men's team tournament at the 2010 Asian Games in Guangzhou took place from 13 November to 15 November at Tianhe Gymnasium.

The final of the 2010 Guangzhou Asian Games on 15 November was a repeat of the Doha Asian Games, with the South Korea men's team meeting China. In the end, China defeated their Korean rivals and gained their second Asian Games men's title. Indonesia and Thailand shared the bronze medal.

The first bout of the contest, the men's singles, was taken by Lin Dan. In the next bout, the men's doubles, Korea's Lee Yong-dae / Jung Jae-sung beat Cai Yun / Fu Haifeng, ranked seventh in the world, 21–17, 20–22, 24–22, to regain ground for Korea. In the next bout, Yoo Yeon-seong / Ko Sung-hyun fought against the Chinese team, but they were unable to carry the momentum of the counterattack and were beaten back. Korea's 1–3 was no match for the Chinese team in the end, with the second consecutive Asian Games silver for Korea.

== Schedule ==
All times are China Standard Time (UTC+08:00)

Date	Time	Event
Saturday, 13 November 2010	09:00	Round of 16
Saturday, 13 November 2010	13:00	Quarterfinals
Sunday, 14 November 2010	12:00	Semifinals
Monday, 15 November 2010	19:00	Final

== Results ==
1st round
Chinese Taipei	3
India	1
Japan	3
Mongolia	0

Quarterfinals
1	China	3
Hong Kong	0
3	Indonesia	3
Chinese Taipei	0
Japan	1
4	South Korea	3
Thailand	3
2	Malaysia	2

Semifinals
1	China	3
3	Indonesia	0
4	South Korea	3
Thailand	1

Final
1	China	3
4	South Korea	1

=== Round of 16 ===
13 November	Chinese Taipei	3–1	India

Hsieh Yu-hsing	2–1	Arvind Bhat	28–26, 15–21, 21–13
Fang Chieh-min / Lee Sheng-mu	2–0	Sanave Thomas / Akshay Dewalkar	21–19, 21–17
Hsueh Hsuan-yi	1–2	Parupalli Kashyap	21–18, 13–21, 21–23
Chen Hung-ling / Lin Yu-lang	2–0	Valiyaveetil Diju / Rupesh Kumar K. T.	21–17, 22–20

13 November	Japan	3–0	Mongolia

Kenichi Tago	2–0	Olonbayaryn Enkhbat	21–7, 21–4
Kazushi Yamada	2–0	Pürevsürengiin Sainbuyan	21–7, 21–11
Sho Sasaki	2–0	Mönkhbaataryn Zolzayaa	21–4, 21–2

=== Quarterfinals ===
13 November	China	3–0	Hong Kong

Lin Dan	2–0	Hu Yun	21–15, 21–17
Chen Jin	2–0	Chan Yan Kit	21–18, 21–8
Chen Long	2–0	Wong Wing Ki	21–13, 21–7

13 November	Indonesia	3–0	Chinese Taipei

Taufik Hidayat	2–1	Hsieh Yu-hsing	11–21, 21–8, 21–12
Markis Kido / Hendra Setiawan	2–0	Fang Chieh-min / Lee Sheng-mu	21–19, 21–9
Simon Santoso	2–1	Hsueh Hsuan-yi	15–21, 21–15, 21–16

13 November	Japan	1–3	South Korea

Kenichi Tago	2–1	Park Sung-hwan	21–15, 10–21, 21–18
Hirokatsu Hashimoto / Noriyasu Hirata	0–2	Jung Jae-sung / Lee Yong-dae	12–21, 12–21
Kazushi Yamada	1–2	Hong Ji-hoon	21–13, 15–21, 17–21
Kenichi Hayakawa / Hiroyuki Endo	0–2	Yoo Yeon-seong / Ko Sung-hyun	25–27, 15–21

13 November	Thailand	3–2	Malaysia

Boonsak Ponsana	2–1	Lee Chong Wei	9–21, 21–10, 21–19
Sudket Prapakamol / Songphon Anugritayawon	0–2	Koo Kien Keat / Tan Boon Heong	12–21, 13–21
Tanongsak Saensomboonsuk	1–2	Mohd Hafiz Hashim	21–14, 14–21, 18–21
Maneepong Jongjit / Bodin Isara	2–1	Mak Hee Chun / Tan Wee Kiong	21–23, 21–12, 21–16
Suppanyu Avihingsanon	2–0	Liew Daren	21–16, 21–16

=== Semifinals ===
14 November	China	3–0	Indonesia

Lin Dan	2–0	Taufik Hidayat	21–13, 23–21
Cai Yun / Fu Haifeng	2–1	Markis Kido / Hendra Setiawan	23–21, 14–21, 21–10
Chen Jin	2–0	Simon Santoso	21–11, 21–15

14 November	South Korea	3–1	Thailand

Park Sung-hwan	2–0	Boonsak Ponsana	21–9, 21–13
Jung Jae-sung / Lee Yong-dae	2–0	Sudket Prapakamol / Songphon Anugritayawon	21–13, 21–14
Son Wan-ho	0–2	Tanongsak Saensomboonsuk	17–21, 21–23
Yoo Yeon-seong / Ko Sung-hyun	2–0	Maneepong Jongjit / Bodin Isara	23–21, 21–13

=== Final ===
15 November	China	3–1	South Korea

Lin Dan	2–1	Park Sung-hwan	19–21, 21–16, 21–18
Cai Yun / Fu Haifeng	1–2	Jung Jae-sung / Lee Yong-dae	17–21, 22–20, 22–24
Chen Jin	2–0	Son Wan-ho	21–9, 21–15
Xu Chen / Guo Zhendong	2–0	Yoo Yeon-seong / Ko Sung-hyun	23–21, 21–17

== Non-participating athletes ==
- Bao Chunlai (CHN)
- He Hanbin (CHN)
- Zhang Nan (CHN)
- Yohan Hadikusumo (HKG)
- Leung Chun Yiu (HKG)
- Wong Wai Hong (HKG)
- Tontowi Ahmad (INA)
- Mohammad Ahsan (INA)
- Sony Dwi Kuncoro (INA)
- Fran Kurniawan (INA)
- Dionysius Hayom Rumbaka (INA)
- Alvent Yulianto (INA)
- Chetan Anand (IND)
- Gurusai Dutt (IND)
- Shintaro Ikeda (JPN)
- Kim Gi-jung (KOR)
- Lee Hyun-il (KOR)
- Shin Baek-cheol (KOR)
- Chan Kwong Beng (MAS)
- Chan Peng Soon (MAS)
- Enkhboldyn Erdenebayar (MGL)
- Pollawat Boonpan (THA)
- Thitipong Lapho (THA)
- Pakkawat Vilailak (THA)
- Chou Tien-chen (TPE)
- Liao Min-chun (TPE)
- Liao Sheng-shiun (TPE)
- Wu Chun-wei (TPE)
