= Hwang Jung-woon =

South Korean badminton player

Personal information
- Born: 10 April 1986 (age 40)
- Height: 1.85 m (6 ft 1 in)
- Weight: 74 kg (163 lb)

Sport
- Country: South Korea
- Sport: Badminton
- Event: Men's singles

Men's singles
- BWF profile
Medal record
Men's badminton
Representing South Korea
Asian Games
Silver medal – second place	2006 Doha	Men's team
World Junior Championships
Silver medal – second place	2004 Richmond	Mixed team
Bronze medal – third place	2004 Richmond	Boys' singles
Asian Junior Championships
Silver medal – second place	2004 Hwacheon	Boys' team
Bronze medal – third place	2004 Hwacheon	Boys' singles

Hwang Jung-woon (Korean: 황정운; born 10 April 1986) is a South Korean badminton player. Hwang who came from Suncheon, graduated from the Dong-a University, and later joined the Samsung Electro-Mechanics team. He was part of the Korean national junior team that won the silver medal at the 2004 Asian Junior Championships in the boys' team event, also won the bronze medal in the singles event. At the same year, he also competed at the World Junior Championships, clinched the silver medal in the mixed team event and a bronze medal in the singles event. Hwang represented his country at the 2006 Asian Games, and helped the team win the men's team silver medal. He also claimed the men's singles title at the 2006 Mongolia Satellite tournament.

== Achievements ==
=== World Junior Championships ===
Boys' singles

Year	Venue	Opponent	Score	Result
2004	Minoru Arena, Richmond, Canada	(China) Chen Jin	1–15, 4–15	Bronze

=== Asian Junior Championships ===
Boys' singles

Year	Venue	Opponent	Score	Result
2004	Hwacheon Indoor Stadium, Hwacheon, South Korea	(China) Chen Jin	10–15, 15–10, 14–17	Bronze

=== IBF International ===
Men's singles

Year	Tournament	Opponent	Score	Result
2006	Mongolia Satellite	(South Korea) Hong Ji-hoon		(gold) Winner
