= Hong Ji-hoon =

South Korean badminton player (born 1988)

Personal information
- Born: 27 October 1988 (age 38) Seoul, South Korea
- Height: 1.76 m (5 ft 9 in)
- Weight: 69 kg (152 lb)

Sport
- Country: South Korea
- Sport: Badminton

Men's singles
- Highest ranking: 43 (12 November 2009)
- BWF profile
Medal record
Men's badminton
Representing South Korea
Sudirman Cup
Silver medal – second place	2013 Kuala Lumpur	Mixed team
Thomas Cup
Silver medal – second place	2008 Jakarta	Men's team
Silver medal – second place	2012 Wuhan	Men's team
Asian Games
Silver medal – second place	2010 Guangzhou	Men's team
Summer Universiade
Gold medal – first place	2013 Kazan	Mixed team
Bronze medal – third place	2013 Kazan	Men's doubles
World Junior Championships
Gold medal – first place	2006 Incheon	Boys' singles
Gold medal – first place	2006 Incheon	Mixed team
Silver medal – second place	2004 Richmond	Mixed team
Asia Junior Championships
Gold medal – first place	2005 Jakarta	Boys' team
Gold medal – first place	2006 Kuala Lumpur	Mixed team
Silver medal – second place	2005 Jakarta	Boys' singles
Bronze medal – third place	2005 Jakarta	Mixed doubles

- Hong Ji-hoon
- Hangul: 홍지훈
- Hanja: 洪智勳
- RR: Hong Jihun
- MR: Hong Chihun

Hong Ji-hoon (Korean: 홍지훈), born 27 October 1988) is a South Korean badminton player.

== Career ==
In 2006, he won a gold medal at the BWF World Junior Championships in the boys' singles event. He defeated Tommy Sugiarto of Indonesia with the score 21–13, 10–21, and 21–16. He became a semi-finalist of the Vietnam Open tournament in the men's doubles event. He and partner Choi Ho-jin were defeated by their teammates Yoo Yeon-seong and Jeon Jun-bum with the score 21–16, 21–19. He also became the runner-up of the Mongolian Satellite tournament in men's singles.

In 2007, he won his first senior title at the Indonesia International Challenge tournament in men's singles. He reached the final round after beating Indra Bagus Ade Chandra of Indonesia 21–16, 21–11. In the final round, he defeated his compatriot Lee Cheol-ho 21–15, 11–21, 21–11. In 2010, he won a silver medal with Korea national badminton team at the Asian Games in the men's team event held in Guangzhou, China. In the final round, they were defeated by China national badminton team in 3–1.

In 2011, he became the champion of the Turkey International tournament in the men's singles. Hong had to work hard to beat Malaysia's Tan Chun Seang in three hard games 22–24, 21–12, 21–16. In 2012, he competed at the Thomas Cup tournament with the Korea national team held in Wuhan, China. They were defeated by the China national team 3–0.

In 2013, he was runner-up at the Korea Grand Prix Gold in the men's singles after being defeated by his teammate Lee Hyun-il 21–18, 21–12. He represented Kyonggi University competed at the 2013 Summer Universiade, and won a gold medal in the men's team and a bronze medal in the men's doubles events.

== Achievements ==
=== Summer Universiade ===
Men's doubles
Year	Venue	Partner	Opponent	Score	Result
2013	Tennis Academy; Kazan, Russia	(South Korea) Kim Ki-jung	(Russia) Vladimir Ivanov (Russia) Ivan Sozonov	21–17, 11–21, 15–21	Bronze

=== World Junior Championships ===
Boys' singles
Year	Venue	Opponent	Score	Result
2006	Samsan World Gymnasium; Incheon, South Korea	(Indonesia) Tommy Sugiarto	21–13, 10–21, 21–16	Gold

=== Asian Junior Championships ===
Boys' singles
Year	Venue	Opponent	Score	Result
2005	Tennis Indoor Senayan; Jakarta, Indonesia	(China) Lu Qicheng	2–15, 3–15	Silver

Mixed doubles
Year	Venue	Partner	Opponent	Score	Result
2005	Tennis Indoor Senayan; Jakarta, Indonesia	(South Korea) Jang Soo-young	(China) Zhang Wei (China) Liao Jingmei	3–15, 4–15	Bronze

=== BWF Grand Prix ===
The BWF Grand Prix had two levels, the BWF Grand Prix and Grand Prix Gold. It was a series of badminton tournaments sanctioned by the Badminton World Federation (BWF) which was held from 2007 to 2017.

Men's singles
Year	Tournament	Opponent	Score	Result
2013	Korea Grand Prix Gold	(South Korea) Lee Hyun-il	18–21, 12–21	(silver) Runner-up

BWF Grand Prix Gold tournament
BWF Grand Prix tournament

=== BWF International Challenge/Series ===
Men's singles
Year	Tournament	Opponent	Score	Result
2006	Mongolia International	(South Korea) Hwang Jung-woon		(silver) Runner-up
2007	Indonesia International	(South Korea) Lee Cheol-ho	21–15, 11–21, 21–11	(gold) Winner
2011	Turkey International	(Malaysia) Tan Chun Seang	22–24, 21–12, 21–16	(gold) Winner

BWF International Challenge tournament
BWF International Series tournament
