= 2004 Asian Junior Badminton Championships =

Tournament details
- Dates: 12–18 July 2004
- Edition: 7
- Venue: Hwacheon Indoor Stadium
- Location: Hwacheon, South Korea

The 2004 Asian Junior Badminton Championships is an Asia continental junior championships to crown the best U-19 badminton players across Asia. This tournament were held in Hwacheon Indoor Stadium, Hwacheon, South Korea from 12 to 18 July.

== Medalists ==
Event	Gold	Silver	Bronze
Boys' teams	China; Cao Liu; Chen Jin; Chen Tianyu; Gong Weijie; He Hanbin; Li Rui; Lu Qicheng; Shen Ye	South Korea; Hwang Jung-woon; Jang Ji-soo; Jeon Jun-bum; Jung Jung-young; Lee Cheol-ho; Lee Yong-dae; Oh Jong-min; Park Young-ung; Um Ji-kwan; Yoo Yeon-seong	Malaysia; Au Kok Leong; Azrihanif Azahar; Chong Wei Feng; Hoon Thien How; Khoo Chung Chiat; Kenn Lim; Mohd Hafiz Shaharudin; Tan Boon Heong; Tan Chun Seang
Boys' teams	China; Cao Liu; Chen Jin; Chen Tianyu; Gong Weijie; He Hanbin; Li Rui; Lu Qicheng; Shen Ye	South Korea; Hwang Jung-woon; Jang Ji-soo; Jeon Jun-bum; Jung Jung-young; Lee Cheol-ho; Lee Yong-dae; Oh Jong-min; Park Young-ung; Um Ji-kwan; Yoo Yeon-seong	Indonesia; Putra Aditya; I Made Agung; Chandra; Ari Yuli Wahyu Hartanto; Stenny Kusuma; Lingga Lie; Muhammad Rijal; Andre Kurniawan Tedjono; Antok Boni Trisnanto; Markus Wijanu
Girls' teams	China; Ding Jiao; Feng Chen; Jiang Yanjiao; Lu Lan; Pan Pan; Wang Lin; Wang Yihan; Zhao Yunlei	South Korea; Ahn Jung-ha; Choi Joo-min; Ha Jung-eun; Hong Soo-jung; Kang Hae-won; Kim Mi-young; Kim Min-jung; Lee Hyun-jin; Lee Seul-ki; Oh Seul-ki	Chinese Taipei; Chang Kuei-ching; Chen Hsiao-huan; Cheng Shao-chieh; Chuang Hui-wen; Hsieh Pei-chen; Hung Shih-chieh; Liu Chia-chi; Liu Hsiao-jo; Pai Min-jie; Tsai Pei-ling; Yang Chia-hua
Girls' teams	China; Ding Jiao; Feng Chen; Jiang Yanjiao; Lu Lan; Pan Pan; Wang Lin; Wang Yihan; Zhao Yunlei	South Korea; Ahn Jung-ha; Choi Joo-min; Ha Jung-eun; Hong Soo-jung; Kang Hae-won; Kim Mi-young; Kim Min-jung; Lee Hyun-jin; Lee Seul-ki; Oh Seul-ki	Indonesia; Pia Zebadiah Bernadeth; Heni Budiman; Maria Elfira Christina; Adriyanti Firdasari; Nitya Krishinda Maheswari; Wiwis Meilyanna; Greysia Polii; Fransisca Ratnasari; Lily Siswanti; Yulianti
Boys' singles	(China) Chen Jin	(China) Gong Weijie	(South Korea) Hwang Jung-woon
Boys' singles	(China) Chen Jin	(China) Gong Weijie	(South Korea) Lee Cheol-ho
Girls' singles	(China) Jiang Yanjiao	(China) Lu Lan	(China) Wang Lin
Girls' singles	(China) Jiang Yanjiao	(China) Lu Lan	(China) Wang Yihan
Boys' doubles	(South Korea) Jung Jung-young (South Korea) Lee Yong-dae	(South Korea) Jeon Jun-bum (South Korea) Yoo Yeon-seong	(China) Shen Ye (China) He Hanbin
Boys' doubles	(South Korea) Jung Jung-young (South Korea) Lee Yong-dae	(South Korea) Jeon Jun-bum (South Korea) Yoo Yeon-seong	(China) Li Rui (China) Cao Liu
Girls' doubles	(China) Ding Jiao (China) Zhao Yunlei	(China) Feng Chen (China) Pan Pan	(South Korea) Ahn Jung-ha (South Korea) Kim Min-jung
Girls' doubles	(China) Ding Jiao (China) Zhao Yunlei	(China) Feng Chen (China) Pan Pan	(South Korea) Ha Jung-eun (South Korea) Oh Seul-ki
Mixed doubles	(China) Shen Ye (China) Feng Chen	(South Korea) Yoo Yeon-seong (South Korea) Ha Jung-eun	(China) He Hanbin (China) Pan Pan
Mixed doubles	(China) Shen Ye (China) Feng Chen	(South Korea) Yoo Yeon-seong (South Korea) Ha Jung-eun	(South Korea) Lee Yong-dae (South Korea) Kang Hae-won

== Medal table ==
Rank	Nation	Gold	Silver	Bronze	Total
1	China (CHN)	6	3	5	14
2	South Korea (KOR)	1	4	5	10
3	Indonesia (INA)	0	0	2	2
4	Chinese Taipei (TPE)	0	0	1	1
4	Malaysia (MAS)	0	0	1	1
Totals (5 entries)		7	7	14	28
