= Chen Jin (badminton) =

Chinese badminton player

Chen Jin 陈金
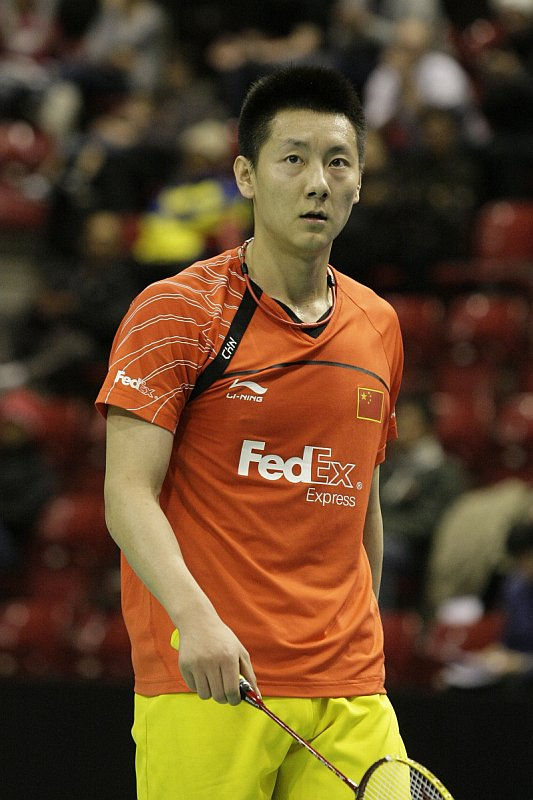

Personal information
- Born: 10 January 1986 (age 40) Handan, Hebei, China
- Years active: 2003–2013
- Height: 1.82 m (6 ft 0 in)
- Weight: 72 kg (159 lb)

Sport
- Country: China
- Sport: Badminton
- Handedness: Right

Men's singles
- Career record: 291 wins, 90 losses
- Highest ranking: 2 (1 February 2007)
- BWF profile
Medal record
Men's badminton
Representing China
Olympic Games
Bronze medal – third place	2008 Beijing	Men's singles
World Championships
Gold medal – first place	2010 Paris	Men's singles
Silver medal – second place	2009 Hyderabad	Men's singles
Bronze medal – third place	2011 London	Men's singles
World Cup
Bronze medal – third place	2006 Yiyang	Men's singles
Thomas Cup
Gold medal – first place	2006 Tokyo	Men's team
Gold medal – first place	2008 Jakarta	Men's team
Gold medal – first place	2010 Kuala Lumpur	Men's team
Gold medal – first place	2012 Wuhan	Men's team
Asian Games
Gold medal – first place	2006 Doha	Men's team
Gold medal – first place	2010 Guangzhou	Men's team
Bronze medal – third place	2010 Guangzhou	Men's singles
Asian Championships
Gold medal – first place	2012 Qingdao	Men's singles
Silver medal – second place	2008 Johor Bahru	Men's singles
East Asian Games
Gold medal – first place	2009 Hong Kong	Men's team
World Junior Championships
Gold medal – first place	2002 Pretoria	Boys' singles
Gold medal – first place	2002 Pretoria	Mixed team
Gold medal – first place	2004 Richmond	Boys' singles
Gold medal – first place	2004 Richmond	Mixed team
Asian Junior Championships
Gold medal – first place	2004 Hwacheon	Boys' singles
Gold medal – first place	2004 Hwacheon	Boys' team
Bronze medal – third place	2002 Kuala Lumpur	Boys' team

Chen Jin
- Traditional Chinese: 陳金
- Simplified Chinese: 陈金
Transcriptions
Standard Mandarin
- Hanyu Pinyin: Chén Jīn

Chen Jin (born 10 January 1986) is a Chinese badminton player. He is a former world men's singles champion and an Olympic bronze medalist. He also served as women's singles coach of the China national badminton team.

== Career ==
=== 2004–2008 ===
Since winning the Asian Junior Championships in 2004, Chen developed into one of the world's elite men's singles players. His titles include the 2004 Polish International, 2004 French International, 2006 German Open, 2007 Swiss Open, and 2007 Macau Open. Chen also captured the China Masters title in 2006, and in 2008 he won his biggest title to date, the prestigious All England Open Badminton Championships over his teammate and then-world number one, Lin Dan. At the 2008 Beijing Olympics, however, he was beaten by Lin in the semi-final and settled for a bronze medal after defeating South Korea's Lee Hyun-il in the playoff for third place. Chen was also a bronze medalist at the 2007 BWF World Championships and a silver medalist at the 2008 Badminton Asia Championships. He is also a member of China's Thomas Cup-winning world men's team champion, lifting the highly coveted cup in 2006 and 2008.

=== 2009 ===
Chen skipped the Malaysia Open and Korea Open events in January. His first tournament in 2009 was the All England Open. Chen went down 12–21 6–11 (retired) against Lin Dan in the semi-final having suffered a slight leg injury. A week later, Chen participated in the Swiss Open. He was again blown away by Lin, losing 13–21 14–21 in their semi-final match. In May, Chen reached the semi-final of the Singapore Open before being defeated by another teammate, Bao Chunlai, with a scoreline of 19–21 18–21.

In June, Chen participated in the Indonesia Open. In Indonesia, he defeated the reigning Olympic champion, Lin Dan, 18–21 21–17 21–4 in the quarter-finals. However, Chen could not progress pass the semi-final stage after being defeated by Lee Chong Wei with a scoreline of 15–21 20–22. In August, Chen won a silver medal at the 2009 BWF World Championships. Chen once again fell to his compatriot, Lin Dan, 21–18, 21–16 in 45 minutes in the final in Hyderabad, India.

=== 2010 ===
In January, Chen entered the Malaysia Open and reached the quarter-finals before losing out to Lee Chong Wei in straight games 11–21, 13–21. A week later, Chen went to the Korea Open. He again reached the quarter-finals before again tasting defeat at the hands of the top seed Lee Chong Wei, this time in rubber games, 14–21, 21–15, 16–21. In March, Chen took part in the All England Open. In yet another quarter-final showing, he lost to Kenichi Tago in rubber games. In the following week, Chen managed to capture his second Swiss Open. The finalist he beat was his compatriot Chen Long. Chen won in rubber games 12–21, 21–15, 21–17 in the final. Later in May, Chen was selected to represent his country in the 2010 Thomas & Uber Cup which was held in Kuala Lumpur, Malaysia and subsequently won the championships after beating Indonesia 3–0 in the Thomas Cup final. Chen played the second singles in the championships. In the final match, he beat Indonesia's Simon Santoso in rubber games 19–21, 21–17, 21–7.

Chen began the second half of the year in style by winning the 2010 BWF World Championships, becoming world champion. He beat Indonesia's Taufik Hidayat 21–13, 21–15 in the final. In September, Chen participated in the China Masters but was outplayed by Chou Tien-chen from Chinese Taipei 18–21, 8–16 (retired) in the second round due to a leg injury. After a two-month rest, Chen came back to play in the 2010 Asian Games men's team and individual tournament which were held in Guangzhou, China. Chen again helped Chinese men's team reach the final by defeating Hong Kong's Chan Yan Kit in the quarter-finals, Indonesia's Simon Santoso in the semi-final, and in the final, he beat South Korean Son Wan-ho with an easy 21–9, 21–15 win. Chen also helped secure the men's team gold medal for China. Later in the individual tournament, Chen again lost to the world number one Lee Chong Wei in rubber games 21–14, 15–21, 7–21. In the final game, Chen made a lot of careless mistakes and allowed Lee to pull away at 11–4, 16–6 and 20–7. Hence, Chen could only add a bronze medal for China in the individual event. A week later, Chen took part in the China Open which was held in Shanghai and reached the semi-finals.

=== 2011 ===
Chen kicked-off the second half of the year with a bronze medal at the 2011 BWF World Championships. He was unable to defend his title after being beaten by Lee Chong Wei 13–21, 9–21 in the semi-finals.

== Coaching ==
After his retirement from competitive badminton, in 2014, he was roped into the national set-up to revamp the women's singles squad.

== Achievements ==
=== Olympic Games ===
Men's singles
Year	Venue	Opponent	Score	Result
2008	Beijing University of Technology Gymnasium, Beijing, China	(South Korea) Lee Hyun-il	21–16, 12–21, 21–14	Bronze

=== BWF World Championships ===
Men's singles
Year	Venue	Opponent	Score	Result
2009	Gachibowli Indoor Stadium, Hyderabad, India	(China) Lin Dan	18–21, 16–21	Silver
2010	Stade Pierre de Coubertin, Paris, France	(Indonesia) Taufik Hidayat	21–13, 21–15	Gold
2011	Wembley Arena, London, England	(Malaysia) Lee Chong Wei	13–21, 9–21	Bronze

=== World Cup ===
Men's singles
Year	Venue	Opponent	Score	Result
2006	Olympic Park, Yiyang, China	(China) Chen Yu	21–17, 18–21, 11–21	Bronze

=== Asian Games ===
Men's singles
Year	Venue	Opponent	Score	Result
2010	Tianhe Gymnasium, Guangzhou, China	(Malaysia) Lee Chong Wei	14–21, 21–15, 7–21	Bronze

=== Asian Championships ===
Men's singles
Year	Venue	Opponent	Score	Result
2008	Bandaraya Stadium, Johor Bahru, Malaysia	(South Korea) Park Sung-hwan	18–21, 18–21	Silver
2012	Qingdao Sports Centre Conson Stadium, Qingdao, China	(China) Du Pengyu	21–12, 21–18	Gold

=== World Junior Championships ===
Boys' singles
Year	Venue	Opponent	Score	Result
2002	Pretoria Showgrounds, Pretoria, South Africa	(Singapore) Kendrick Lee Yen Hui	15–10, 15–5	Gold
2004	Minoru Arena, Richmond, Canada	(China) Gong Weijie	12–15, 15–8, 17–14	Gold

=== Asian Junior Championships ===
Boys' singles
Year	Venue	Opponent	Score	Result
2004	Hwacheon Indoor Stadium, Hwacheon, South Korea	(China) Gong Weijie	15–7, 15–8	Gold

=== BWF Superseries ===
The BWF Superseries, launched on 14 December 2006 and implemented in 2007, is a series of elite badminton tournaments, sanctioned by Badminton World Federation (BWF). BWF Superseries has two levels: Superseries and Superseries Premier. A season of Superseries features twelve tournaments around the world, which introduced since 2011, with successful players invited to the Superseries Finals held at the year end.

Men's singles
Year	Tournament	Opponent	Score	Result
2007	Korea Open	(China) Lin Dan	14–21, 19–21	(silver) Runner-up
2007	Swiss Open	(Indonesia) Simon Santoso	21–16, 21–10	(gold) Winner
2008	All England Open	(China) Lin Dan	22–20, 25–23	(gold) Winner
2008	China Masters	(Indonesia) Sony Dwi Kuncoro	19–21, 18–21	(silver) Runner-up
2008	Hong Kong Open	(China) Lin Dan	21–9, 9–21, 21–17	(gold) Winner
2010	Swiss Open	(China) Chen Long	12–21, 21–15, 21–17	(gold) Winner
2011	Singapore Open	(China) Lin Dan	Walkover	(gold) Winner
2011	China Masters	(China) Chen Long	16–21, 20–22	(silver) Runner-up
2011	Hong Kong Open	(China) Lin Dan	12–21, 19–21	(silver) Runner-up

BWF Super Series Finals tournament
BWF Super Series Premier tournament
BWF Super Series tournament

=== BWF Grand Prix ===
The BWF Grand Prix has two level such as Grand Prix and Grand Prix Gold. It is a series of badminton tournaments, sanctioned by Badminton World Federation (BWF) since 2007. The World Badminton Grand Prix has been sanctioned by the International Badminton Federation since 1983.

Men's singles
Year	Tournament	Opponent	Score	Result
2006	German Open	(China) Chen Hong	15–3, 15–7	(gold) Winner
2006	China Masters	(Denmark) Peter Gade	21–19, 21–14	(gold) Winner
2006	Thailand Open	(China) Chen Yu	17–21, 23–21, 20–22	(silver) Runner-up
2007	Macau Open	(Indonesia) Taufik Hidayat	19–21, 21–17, 21–18	(gold) Winner
2011	German Open	(China) Lin Dan	19–21, 11–21	(silver) Runner-up
2012	Swiss Open	(South Korea) Lee Hyun-il	14–21, 21–9, 21–17	(gold) Winner
2012	Australian Open	(Vietnam) Nguyễn Tiến Minh	21–11, 21–12	(gold) Winner

BWF Grand Prix Gold tournament
BWF Grand Prix tournament

=== IBF International ===
Men's singles
Year	Tournament	Opponent	Score	Result
2004	French International	(Germany) Björn Joppien	15–9, 15–5	(gold) Winner
2004	Polish International	(Poland) Przemysław Wacha	15–4, 15–2	(gold) Winner
