= Tan Chun Seang =

Malaysian badminton player (born 1986)

Tan Chun Seang 陈俊翔
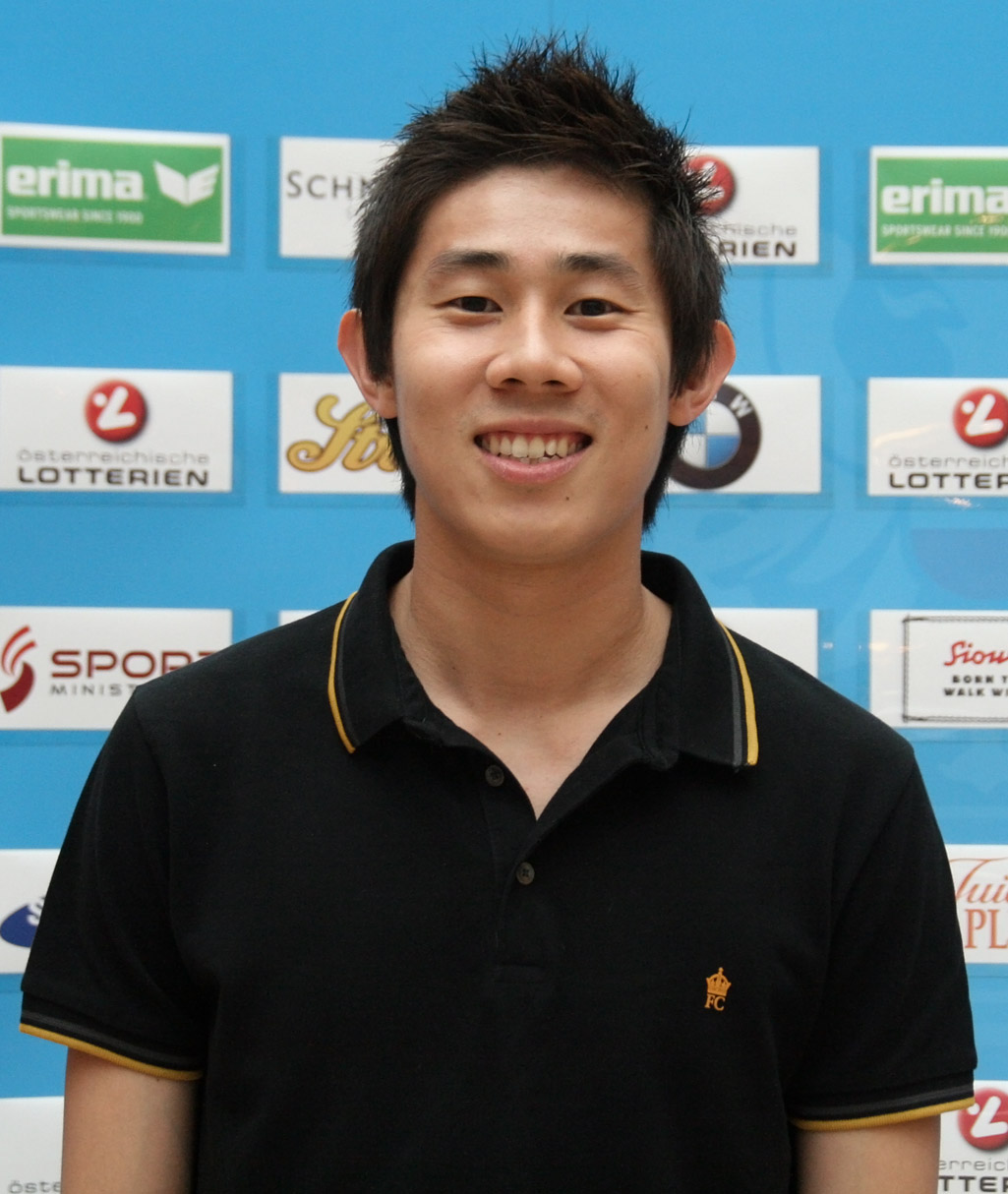

Personal information
- Born: Tan Chun Seang; 22 August 1986 (age 40) Alor Setar, Kedah, Malaysia

Sport
- Country: Malaysia
- Sport: Badminton
- Highest ranking: 32 (14 March 2013)
- BWF profile
Medal record
Men's badminton
Representing Malaysia
Sudirman Cup
| Bronze medal – third place | 2009 Guangzhou | Mixed team |
Southeast Asian Games
| Bronze medal – third place | 2007 Nakhon Ratchasima | Men's team |
Asian Junior Championships
| Bronze medal – third place | 2004 Hwacheon | Boys' team |

Tan Chun Seang
- Traditional Chinese: 陳俊翔
- Simplified Chinese: 陈俊翔
Transcriptions
Standard Mandarin
- Hanyu Pinyin: Chén Jùnxiáng

Tan Chun Seang (born 22 August 1986) is a Malaysian badminton player specializing in men's singles. His best achievement was won the Grand Prix title at the 2013 Canada Open by beating Eric Pang in the final. He was banned from playing in Asian countries for two years by Badminton Association of Malaysia due to his decision to quit the national team. In 2018, Tan was suspended by the Badminton World Federation and banned from participate in fifteen years for playing tournaments over match fixing allegations.

== Career achievements ==
Men's singles

| Year | Championship | Opponent | Score | Result |
|---|---|---|---|---|
| 2014 | Malaysia International | (South Korea) Lee Hyun-il | 21-17, 16-21, 11–21 | Runner-up |
| 2014 | Vietnam International | (Vietnam) Nguyen Tien Minh | 17-21, 13–21 | Runner-up |
| 2013 | Canada Open | (Netherlands) Eric Pang | 15-21, 21-11, 21–16 | Winner |
| 2013 | Vietnam Open | (South Korea) Son Wan-ho | 14-21, 9–21 | Runner-up |
| 2012 | Norwegian International | (Chinese Taipei) Chou Tien-chen | 17-21, 12–21 | Runner-up |
| 2012 | Bulgarian Hebar Open | (Austria) David Obernosterer | 14-21, 21-15, 21–10 | Winner |
| 2012 | Tahiti International | (Israel) Misha Zilberman | 30-29, 21–8 | Winner |
| 2012 | Peru International | (Cuba) Osleni Guerrero | 21-15, 21–11 | Winner |
| 2011 | Turkey International | (South Korea) Hong Ji-hoon | 24-22, 12-21, 16–21 | Runner-up |

Men's doubles

| Year | Championship | Partner | Opponent | Score | Result |
|---|---|---|---|---|---|
| 2012 | Bulgarian Hebar Open | (Austria) Roman Zirnwald | (France) Marin Baumann (France) Lucas Corvée | 21-17, 17-21, 21–11 | Winner |

Notes:

Grand Prix tournaments
International Challenge tournaments
International Series tournaments
