= Mongolia International =

Badminton championships in Mongolia

The Mongolia international or Mongolia Satellite is an open international badminton tournament in Mongolia organised by the Mongolian Badminton Association, sanctioned by the Badminton World Federation and Badminton Asia. This tournament established since 2005, and has been an International Series level since 2007. In 2019, it was promoted to International Challenge level.

== Previous winners ==
Year	Men's singles	Women's singles	Men's doubles	Women's doubles	Mixed doubles
2005	(China) Xuan Chuan	(China) Zhou Bingqing	(South Korea) Lee Yong-dae (South Korea) Han Sang-hoon	(China) Tao Xiaolan (China) Wu Bei	(South Korea) Lee Yong-dae (South Korea) Ha Jung-eun
2006	(South Korea) Hwang Jung-woon	(South Korea) Jang Soo-young	(South Korea) Jeon Jun-bum (South Korea) Yoo Yeon-seong	(South Korea) Kim Min-jung (South Korea) Sun In-jang	(South Korea) Yoo Yeon-seong (South Korea) Kim Min-jung
2007	No competition				
2008	(Scotland) Alistair Casey	(Mongolia) Battschuluuny Gerelmaa	(Scotland) Alistair Casey (Austria) Clemens Michael Smola	No competition	(Mongolia) Olonbajaryn Enchbat (Mongolia) Battschuluuny Gerelmaa
2009	(Slovakia) Michal Matejka	(Slovakia) Monika Fašungová	(Mongolia) Battöriin Dawaasüren (Mongolia) Mönchbaataryn Dsoldsajaa	(Mongolia) Mönchbajaryn Dulamsüren (Slovakia) Monika Fašungová	(Slovakia) Michal Matejka (Slovakia) Monika Fašungová
2010	(Slovakia) Michal Matejka	(Slovakia) Monika Fašungová	(New Zealand) Maoni Hu He (Mongolia) Pürewsürengiin Enchmandach	(Mongolia) Battschuluuny Gerelmaa (Slovakia) Monika Fašungová	(Slovakia) Michal Matejka (Slovakia) Monika Fašungová
2011– 2014	No competition				
2015	(South Korea) Lee Cheol-ho	(South Korea) Lim Soo-bin	(South Korea) Kim Dae-sung (South Korea) Kim Young-sun	(South Korea) Kang Ga-ae (South Korea) Lee Ja-yeong	(South Korea) Kim Young-sun (South Korea) Lee Ja-yeong
2016	No competition				
2017	(South Korea) Park Sung-min	(Vietnam) Nguyễn Thùy Linh	(South Korea) Jung Jung-young (South Korea) Shin Hee-kwang	(South Korea) Han So-yeon (South Korea) Ko Hye-ryeon	(South Korea) Jung Jung-young (South Korea) Ko Hye-ryeon
2018	(Singapore) Loh Kean Yew	(Hong Kong) Deng Xuan	(Singapore) Lee Jian Liang (Singapore) Jason Wong	(Singapore) Citra Putri Sari Dewi (Singapore) Jin Yujia	(Singapore) Bimo Adi Prakoso (Singapore) Jin Yujia
2019	(Japan) Kodai Naraoka	(Thailand) Supanida Katethong	(South Korea) Kim Won-ho (South Korea) Park Kyung-hoon	(Singapore) Shinta Mulia Sari (Singapore) Crystal Wong	(Hong Kong) Mak Hee Chun (Hong Kong) Chau Hoi Wah
2020	Cancelled (Note: This tournament, originally to be played from 26 to 31 May, was later cancelled due to the COVID-19 pandemic in Mongolia.)				
2021	Cancelled (Note: This tournament, originally to be played from 28 September to 2 October, was later cancelled due to the COVID-19 pandemic in Mongolia.)				
2022	(Chinese Taipei) Lin Chun-yi	(Indonesia) Sri Fatmawati	(Japan) Ayato Endo (Japan) Yuta Takei	(South Korea) Seong Seung-yeon (South Korea) Yoon Min-ah	(South Korea) Choi Hyun-beom (South Korea) Yoon Min-ah
2023	(Hong Kong) Chan Yin Chak	(Japan) Akari Kurihara	(Malaysia) Low Hang Yee (Malaysia) Ng Eng Cheong	(Hong Kong) Lui Lok Lok (Hong Kong) Ng Wing Yung	(Australia) Kenneth Zhe Hooi Choo (Australia) Gronya Somerville
2024	No competition				
2025	Cancelled (Note: This tournament, originally to be played on 23–28 December, was later cancelled.)				

== Performances by countries ==
As of the 2023 edition

Pos	Country	MS	WS	MD	WD	XD	Total
1	South Korea	3	2	5	4	5	19
2	Slovakia	2	2	0	1	2	7
3	Singapore	1	0	1	2	1	5
4	Mongolia	0	1	1.5	1	1	4.5
5	Hong Kong	1	1	0	1	1	4
6	China	1	1	0	1	0	3
6	Japan	1	1	1	0	0	3
8	Scotland	1	0	0.5	0	0	1.5
9	Australia	0	0	0	0	1	1
9	Chinese Taipei	1	0	0	0	0	1
9	Indonesia	0	1	0	0	0	1
9	Malaysia	0	0	1	0	0	1
9	Thailand	0	1	0	0	0	1
9	Vietnam	0	1	0	0	0	1
15	Austria	0	0	0.5	0	0	0.5
15	New Zealand	0	0	0.5	0	0	0.5
Total		11	11	11	10	11	54
