= Gong Weijie =

Chinese badminton player

Gong Weijie 龚伟杰
Personal information
- Born: 2 June 1986 (age 40) Jingzhou, Hubei, China
- Height: 1.85 m (6 ft 1 in)

Sport
- Country: China
- Sport: Badminton
- Handedness: Right
- Event: Men's singles & doubles

Men's singles & doubles
- BWF profile
Medal record
Men's badminton
Representing China
Summer Universiade
Silver medal – second place	2007 Bangkok	Mixed team
World Junior Championships
Gold medal – first place	2004 Richmond	Mixed team
Silver medal – second place	2004 Richmond	Boys' singles
Asian Junior Championships
Gold medal – first place	2004 Hwacheon	Boys' team
Silver medal – second place	2004 Hwacheon	Boys' singles
Bronze medal – third place	2002 Kuala Lumpur	Boys' team

Gong Weijie (Chinese: 龚伟杰; born 2 June 1986) is a Chinese badminton player from Jingzhou, Hubei. Gong joined the Xiamen team in 1997, and was selected to join the national team in 2002. In the junior event, he won the silver medal in the boys' singles event at the 2004 Asian and World Junior Championships. Gong, who was educated at the China University of Geosciences, claimed the men' singles title at the 2006 World University Championships. He was also part of the national team that won the silver medal at the 2007 Summer Universiade, and became a finalist at the 2009 German Open. After retiring from the tournament, Gong found the Wei Jie Culture Communication company and Gong Weijie badminton club.

== Achievements ==
=== World Junior Championships ===
Boys' singles
Year	Venue	Opponent	Score	Result
2004	Minoru Arena; Richmond, Canada	(China) Chen Jin	15–12, 8–15, 14–17	Silver

=== Asian Junior Championships ===
Boys' singles
Year	Venue	Opponent	Score	Result
2004	Hwacheon Indoor Stadium; Hwacheon, South Korea	(China) Chen Jin	7–15, 8–15	Silver

=== BWF Grand Prix ===
The BWF Grand Prix has two levels, the Grand Prix and Grand Prix Gold. It is a series of badminton tournaments sanctioned by the Badminton World Federation (BWF) since 2007.

Men's singles
Year	Tournament	Opponent	Score	Result
2009	German Open	(China) Bao Chunlai	18–21, 14–21	(silver) Runner-up

BWF Grand Prix Gold tournament
BWF Grand Prix tournament
