= Park Sung-hwan =

South Korean badminton player (born 1984)

Personal information
- Born: September 4, 1984 (age 42) Jeju Province, South Korea
- Height: 1.86 m (6 ft 1 in)
- Weight: 75 kg (165 lb; 11.8 st)

Sport
- Country: South Korea
- Sport: Badminton
- Handedness: Right

Men's singles
- Highest ranking: 6 (November 2009)
- BWF profile
Medal record
Men's badminton
Representing South Korea
World Championships
Bronze medal – third place	2010 Paris	Men's singles
Sudirman Cup
Gold medal – first place	2003 Eindhoven	Mixed team
Silver medal – second place	2009 Guangzhou	Mixed team
Bronze medal – third place	2011 Qingdao	Mixed team
Bronze medal – third place	2007 Glasgow	Mixed team
Thomas Cup
Silver medal – second place	2008 Jakarta	Men's team
Asian Games
Silver medal – second place	2006 Doha	Men's team
Silver medal – second place	2010 Guangzhou	Men's team
Bronze medal – third place	2010 Guangzhou	Men's singles
Asian Championships
Gold medal – first place	2008 Johor Bahru	Men's singles
Bronze medal – third place	2006 Johor Bahru	Men's singles
World Junior Championships
Gold medal – first place	2002 Pretoria	Boys' doubles
Silver medal – second place	2002 Pretoria	Mixed team
Bronze medal – third place	2002 Pretoria	Boys' singles
Asian Junior Championships
Gold medal – first place	2002 Kuala Lumpur	Boys' singles
Silver medal – second place	2002 Kuala Lumpur	Boys' team

- Park Sung-hwan
- Hangul: 박성환
- Hanja: 朴成煥
- RR: Bak Seonghwan
- MR: Pak Sŏnghwan

Park Sung-hwan (Korean: 박성환; Hanja: 朴成煥; born September 4, 1984, in Jeju Province) is a badminton player from South Korea. Park is the top-ranked men's singles player in South Korea and has succeeded at an international level, winning individual medals at both the 2010 World Championships and the 2010 Asian Games.

== Career ==
=== 2004–2007 ===
In 2005, Park won the Indonesia International and then competed at the 2007 BWF World Championships in the men's singles division; for the latter, he was defeated in the third round by Chen Yu, of the China, with a final score of: 15–21, 21–16, 21–15.

=== 2008 ===
In 2008, Park competed in the 2008 Summer Olympic Games in Beijing, China, but was unable to move beyond the first round and second rounds. He was defeated by the world number one player at the time, Lin Dan (China). During this year, Park won the Badminton Asia Championships and the Korea International Challenge titles, beating China's Chen Jin (21–18, 21–18) and South Korean, Lee Cheol Ho (21–14, 21–13) respectively.

=== 2009 ===
Park entered the Proton Malaysian Open, held in January, and played the world number one-ranked player at the time, Lee Chong Wei, in the final—Park lost with a score of 14–21, 13–21. The following week, Park joined the Korea Open Super Series and was again stopped by the number-one seed, Lee Chong Wei of Malaysia, with a score of 21–18, 7–21, 16–21 in the quarter-final match. Park skipped the All England Open Super Series and the Wilson Swiss Open Super Series, both held in March.

In May, he entered the Li Ning Sudirman Cup, held in China. The Sudirman Cup was a team competition and the South Korean team reached the final in which they played against the Chinese team. Park Sung-hwan was defeated in the final, with a score of 14–21, 18–21, in a match against the Olympic champion, Lin Dan, and lost one point for his team. The South Korean team was eventually awarded the silver medal, having lost 0–3 to China.

Park then participated in the Aviva Singapore Open Super Series in April, where he reached the semi-finals. Boonsak Ponsana, from Thailand, eventually won the tournament, beating Park with a score of 19–21, 21–18, 13–21. A week later, Park joined the Djarum Indonesia Open Super Series and lost to the world number one, Lee Chong Wei, 9–21, 13–21, in the quarter-final match. Two months later, Park entered the Chinese Taipei Grand Prix Gold Open, which is held in the last week of August, and was beaten by Muhammad Hafiz Hashim from Malaysia, 15–21, 18–21, again in the quarter-final match. Two weeks later, Park was to be defeated again in the quarter-final matches of the Li Ning China Masters Super Series in Changzhou, China (to 4th seed badminton ace Lin Dan of China, 15–21, 21–13, 21–23), and the Japan Open Super Series (to Indonesian, Taufik Hidayat, 21–12, 26–28, 15–21).

In November, Park participated in the Yonex Sunrise Hong Kong Open and lost 15–21, 16–21, against Hong Kong player, Chan Yan Kit, in the second round. Park's next event was the China Open Super Series, held in Shanghai, China, where he reached the semi-final round and lost to the 2009 World Badminton Championships champion, Lin Dan; the final score was 10–21, 11–21.

=== 2010 ===
Park entered the Super Series tournament of the Korea Open, which is held in January, and was eliminated in the quarter-final stage by Denmark's Peter Gade, 21–17, 16–21, 20–22. Park then lost 16–21, 17–21, to Du Pengyu from China in the first round of the Malaysia Open. In March, at the All England Open, Park lost in the second round, 5–21, 10–21, to 6th seed, Bao Chunlai of China, after defeating Japan's Sho Sasaki, 21–13 21–11, in the opening round. The All England Open was followed by the Wilson Swiss Open, held at the Basel Stadium in Switzerland, and after defeating Lithuania's Kestutis Navickas, 21–13, 21–13, in the opening round, Park lost to Dane, Peter Gade, in straight games: 15–21, 16–21.

In May, Park returned to Malaysia for the 2010 Proton Thomas & Uber Cup Finals, held in the capital city, Kuala Lumpur. Park again was beaten by China's Lin Dan, 18–21, 23–25, in the second round and had conceded one point for his team. In the quarter-final match, Park played against Dan once again and lost 16–21, 15–21. Meanwhile, his team members also lost to the other Chinese players. The final score was 0–3 in favour of the Chinese team.

In August, Park's entered the 2010 BWF World Championships, where he made it through to the semi-final, registering a win against Lin Dan, 21–13 21–13, in the quarter-final. However, Indonesia's Taufik Hidayat later defeated Park with a score of 10–21, 20–22, in the last four; Park emerged with the bronze medal. After the world championships, Park played in the China Masters Super Series in Changzhou, China, in September. On this occasion, he lost to Lin Dan, 11–21, 17–21, in the opening round. Park then entered the Japan Open Super Series and was again matched up against Lin Dan following a victory in the second round. In the final eight, Park was knocked out by Lin Dan, 20–22, 16–21.

The Asian Games team challenge was held in November in Guangzhou, China. Park represented Korea in the finals, meeting Lin Dan on yet another occasion, and, again, lost with a score of 21–19, 16–21, 18–21. The Korean team eventually won the silver medal, losing 1–3 to the Chinese team. In the individual match section of the Asian Games, Park faced Lin Dan in the semi-finals and was defeated 14–21, 10–21, winning a bronze medal for Korea. The next month, Park joined the China Open Super Series in Shanghai and defeated China's Wang Zhengming in the opening round with a score of 21–5, 11–21, 21–17. In the second round, Park lost to 5th seed, Chen Long of China, 12–21, 16–21, signaling the South Korean's exit from the tournament.

== Achievements ==
=== BWF World Championships ===
Men's singles
Year	Venue	Opponent	Score	Result
2010	Stade Pierre de Coubertin; Paris, France	(Indonesia) Taufik Hidayat	10–21, 20–22	Bronze

=== Asian Games ===
Men's singles
Year	Venue	Opponent	Score	Result
2010	Tianhe Gymnasium; Guangzhou, China	(China) Lin Dan	14–21, 10–21	Bronze

=== Asian Championships ===
Men's singles
Year	Venue	Opponent	Score	Result
2008	Bandaraya Stadium; Johor Bahru, Malaysia	(China) Chen Jin	21–18, 21–18	Gold
2006	Bandaraya Stadium; Johor Bahru, Malaysia	(Malaysia) Lee Chong Wei	15–21, 15–21	Bronze

=== World Junior Championships ===
Boys' singles
Year	Venue	Opponent	Score	Result
2002	Pretoria Showgrounds; Pretoria, South Africa	(Singapore) Kendrick Lee Yen Hui	5–15, 4–15	Bronze

Boys' doubles
Year	Venue	Partner	Opponent	Score	Result
2002	Pretoria Showgrounds; Pretoria, South Africa	(South Korea) Han Sang-hoon	(Malaysia) Jack Koh (Malaysia) Tan Bin Shen	15–17, 15–9, 15–9	Gold

=== Asian Junior Championships ===
Boys' singles
Year	Venue	Opponent	Score	Result
2002	Kuala Lumpur Badminton Stadium; Kuala Lumpur, Malaysia	(Singapore) Hendra Wijaya	15–11, 11–5	Gold

=== BWF Superseries ===
The BWF Superseries, launched on 14 December 2006 and implemented in 2007, is a series of elite badminton tournaments, sanctioned by Badminton World Federation (BWF). BWF Superseries has two levels: Superseries and Superseries Premier. A season of Superseries features twelve tournaments around the world, which introduced since 2011, with successful players invited to the Superseries Finals held at the year end.

Men's singles
Year	Tournament	Opponent	Score	Result
2009	Super Series Masters Finals	(Malaysia) Lee Chong Wei	17–21, 17–21	(silver) Runner-up
2009	Malaysia Open	(Malaysia) Lee Chong Wei	13–21, 7–21	(silver) Runner-up

BWF Super Series Finals tournament
BWF Super Series Premier tournament
BWF Super Series tournament

=== BWF Grand Prix ===
The BWF Grand Prix has two level such as Grand Prix and Grand Prix Gold. It is a series of badminton tournaments, sanctioned by Badminton World Federation (BWF) since 2007. The World Badminton Grand Prix has been sanctioned by the International Badminton Federation since 1983.

Men's singles
Year	Tournament	Opponent	Score	Result
2011	Swiss Open	(South Korea) Lee Hyun-il	17–21, 21–9, 21–17	(gold) Winner
2004	Malaysia Open	(Malaysia) Lee Chong Wei	3–15, 12–15	(silver) Runner-up

BWF Grand Prix Gold tournament
BWF Grand Prix tournament

=== BWF International Challenge/Series ===
Men's Singles
Year	Tournament	Opponent	Score	Result
2008	Korea International	(South Korea) Lee Cheol-ho	21–14, 21–13	(gold) Winner
2005	Surabaya Satellite	(Indonesia) Jeffer Rosobin	17–16, 10–15, 15–11	(gold) Winner

BWF International Challenge tournament
BWF International Series tournament
