= Son Wan-ho =

South Korean badminton player (born 1988)

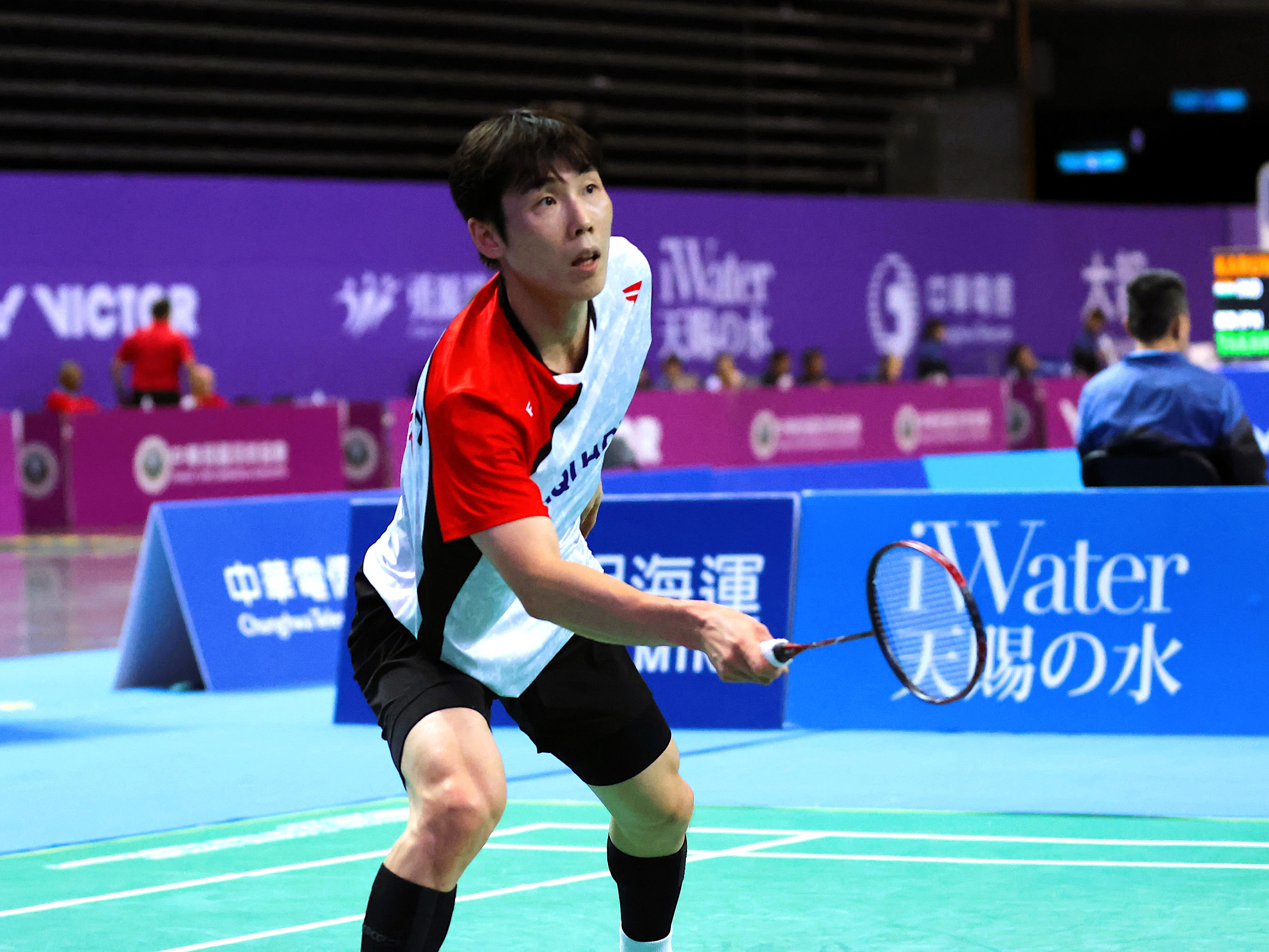
- Son at the 2023 Kaohsiung Masters

Personal information
- Born: 17 May 1988 (age 38) Changwon, South Gyeongsang, South Korea
- Years active: 2006–present
- Height: 1.76 m (5 ft 9 in)
- Weight: 143 lb (65 kg)
- Spouse: Sung Ji-hyun (m. 2020)

Sport
- Country: South Korea
- Sport: Badminton
- Handedness: Right

Men's singles
- Career record: 343 wins, 190 losses
- Highest ranking: 1 (25 May 2017)
- Current ranking: 281 (29 October 2024)
- BWF profile
Medal record
Men's badminton
Representing South Korea
World Championships
Bronze medal – third place	2017 Glasgow	Men's singles
Sudirman Cup
Gold medal – first place	2017 Gold Coast	Mixed team
Bronze medal – third place	2015 Dongguan	Mixed team
Thomas Cup
Silver medal – second place	2012 Wuhan	Men's team
Bronze medal – third place	2016 Kunshan	Men's team
Asian Games
Gold medal – first place	2014 Incheon	Men's team
Silver medal – second place	2010 Guangzhou	Men's team
Asia Mixed Team Championships
Silver medal – second place	2017 Ho Chi Minh	Mixed team
Asia Team Championships
Bronze medal – third place	2016 Hyderabad	Men's team
Bronze medal – third place	2018 Alor Setar	Men's team
East Asian Games
Bronze medal – third place	2009 Hong Kong	Men's singles
Bronze medal – third place	2009 Hong Kong	Men's team
Summer Universiade
Gold medal – first place	2015 Gwangju	Mixed team
Silver medal – second place	2015 Gwangju	Men's singles
Asian Junior Championships
Gold medal – first place	2005 Jakarta	Boys' team

- Son Wan-ho
- Hangul: 손완호
- Hanja: 孫完虎
- RR: Son Wanho
- MR: Son Wanho

Son Wan-ho (Korean: 손완호; Korean pronunciation: [so.nwan.ɦo] or [son] [wan.ɦo]; born 17 May 1988) is a South Korean badminton player. He reached a career high as world number 1 in the men's singles in May 2017. He competed at the 2012 and 2016 Summer Olympics. He plays primarily defensively, and began playing badminton after a teacher suggested it to him in elementary school. He holds a bachelor's degree from Inha University in Incheon, South Korea. In 2017, he helped the Korean national team reach the final at the Sudirman Cup and won that tournament. He is married to compatriot women's singles player, Sung Ji-hyun.

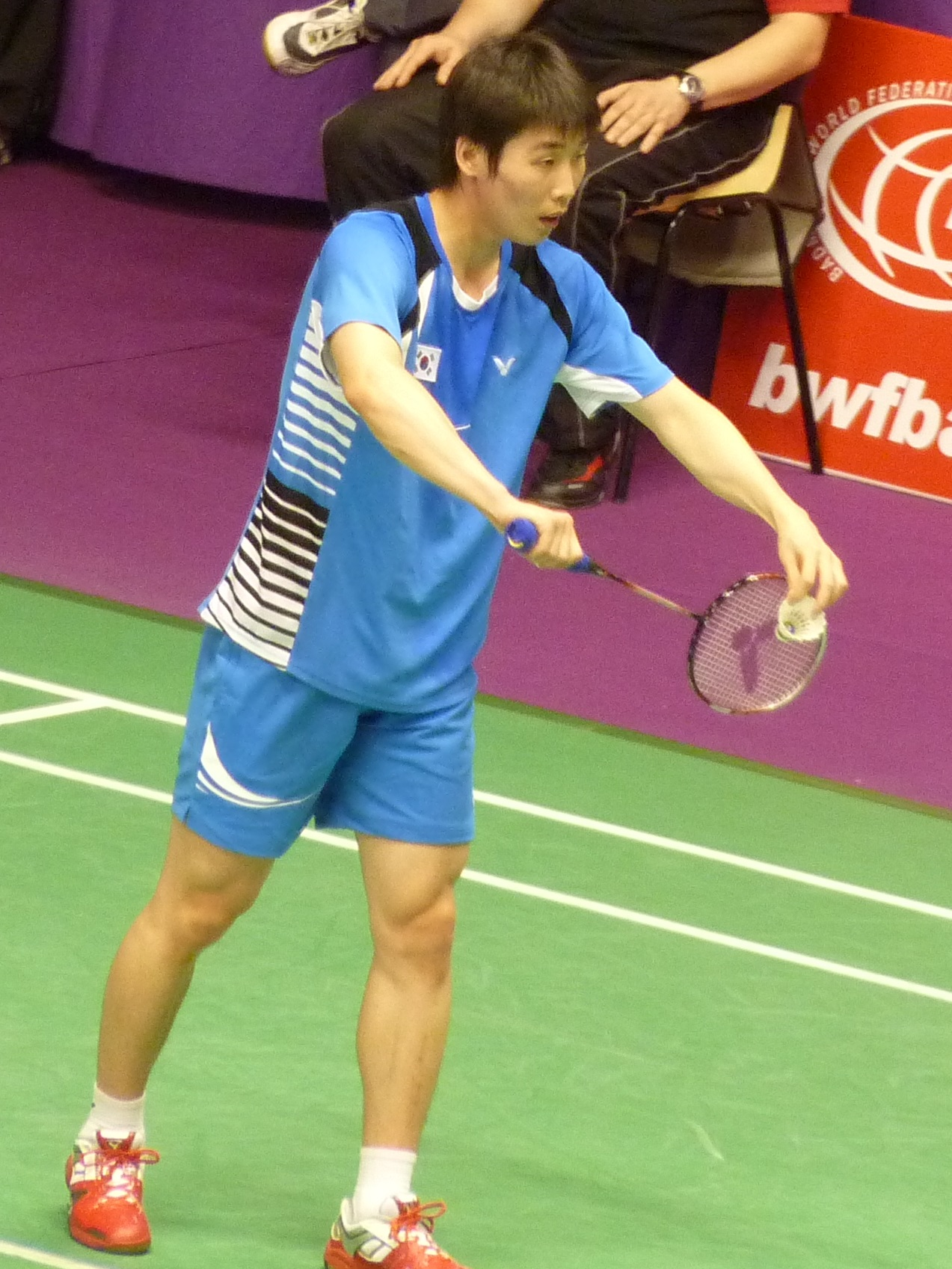
Son at the 2010 BWF World Championships

== Achievements ==
=== BWF World Championships ===
Men's singles
Year	Venue	Opponent	Score	Result
2017	Emirates Arena; Glasgow, Scotland	(China) Lin Dan	17–21, 14–21	Bronze

=== East Asian Games ===
Men's singles
Year	Venue	Opponent	Score	Result
2009	Queen Elizabeth Stadium, Hong Kong	(China) Lin Dan	12–21, 21–23	Bronze

=== Summer Universiade ===
Men's singles
Year	Venue	Opponent	Score	Result
2015	Hwasun Hanium Culture Sports Center; Hwasun, South Korea	(South Korea) Jeon Hyeok-jin	20–22, 21–13, 17–21	Silver

=== BWF World Tour (3 titles) ===
The BWF World Tour, which was announced on 19 March 2017 and implemented in 2018, is a series of elite badminton tournaments sanctioned by the Badminton World Federation (BWF). The BWF World Tours are divided into levels of World Tour Finals, Super 1000, Super 750, Super 500, Super 300 (part of the HSBC World Tour), and the BWF Tour Super 100.

Men's singles
Year	Tournament	Level	Opponent	Score	Result
2018	Hong Kong Open	Super 500	(Japan) Kenta Nishimoto	14–21, 21–17, 21–13	(gold) Winner
2018	Korea Masters	Super 300	(Malaysia) Lee Zii Jia	21–16, 21–11	(gold) Winner
2019	Malaysia Masters	Super 500	(China) Chen Long	21–17, 21–19	(gold) Winner

=== BWF Superseries (2 titles, 5 runners-up) ===
The BWF Superseries, which was launched on 14 December 2006 and implemented in 2007, was a series of elite badminton tournaments, sanctioned by the Badminton World Federation (BWF). BWF Superseries levels were Superseries and Superseries Premier. A season of Superseries consisted of twelve tournaments around the world that had been introduced since 2011. Successful players were invited to the Superseries Finals, which were held at the end of each year.

Men's singles
Year	Tournament	Opponent	Score	Result
2012	India Open	(Malaysia) Lee Chong Wei	21–18, 14–21, 21–19	(gold) Winner
2012	China Masters	(China) Wang Zhengming	21–11, 14–21, 22–24	(silver) Runner-up
2014	Denmark Open	(China) Chen Long	19–21, 22–24	(silver) Runner-up
2014	Hong Kong Open	(China) Chen Long	21–19, 21–16	(gold) Winner
2016	Singapore Open	(Indonesia) Sony Dwi Kuncoro	16–21, 21–13, 14–21	(silver) Runner-up
2016	Korea Open	(China) Qiao Bin	11–21, 23–21, 7–21	(silver) Runner-up
2016	Denmark Open	(Thailand) Tanongsak Saensomboonsuk	13–21, 21–23	(silver) Runner-up

BWF Super Series Finals tournament
BWF Super Series Premier tournament
BWF Super Series tournament

=== BWF Grand Prix (4 titles, 2 runners-up) ===
The BWF Grand Prix had two levels, the Grand Prix and Grand Prix Gold. It was a series of badminton tournaments sanctioned by the Badminton World Federation (BWF) and played between 2007 and 2017.

Men's singles
Year	Tournament	Opponent	Score	Result
2010	Chinese Taipei Open	(Indonesia) Simon Santoso	14–21, 11–21	(silver) Runner-up
2011	Korea Grand Prix Gold	(South Korea) Lee Hyun-il	18–21, 16–21	(silver) Runner-up
2013	Chinese Taipei Open	(Vietnam) Nguyễn Tiến Minh	19–21, 21–9, 21–18	(gold) Winner
2013	Macau Open	(Chinese Taipei) Hsueh Hsuan-yi	21–11, 21–15	(gold) Winner
2013	Vietnam Open	(Malaysia) Tan Chun Seang	21–14, 21–9	(gold) Winner
2016	Korea Masters	(Malaysia) Liew Daren	21–13, 21–16	(gold) Winner

BWF Grand Prix Gold tournament
BWF Grand Prix tournament

=== BWF International Challenge/Series (2 runners-up) ===
Men's singles
Year	Tournament	Opponent	Score	Result
2009	Osaka International	(South Korea) Lee Cheol-ho	21–19, 11–21, 11–21	(silver) Runner-up
2024	Thailand International	(South Korea) Jeon Hyeok-jin	8–21, 0–6 retired	(silver) Runner-up

BWF International Challenge tournament
BWF International Series tournament

== Record against selected opponents ==
Record against Year-end Finals finalists, World Championships semi-finalists, and Olympic quarter-finalists. Accurate as of 1 December 2022.

Player	Matches	Win	Lost	Diff.
(China) Bao Chunlai	2	0	2	–2
(China) Chen Long	17	5	12	–7
(China) Du Pengyu	3	0	3	–3
(China) Lin Dan	14	3	11	–8
(China) Shi Yuqi	9	4	5	–1
(China) Tian Houwei	9	6	3	+3
(China) Zhao Junpeng	2	2	0	+2
(Chinese Taipei) Chou Tien-chen	11	8	3	+5
(Denmark) Anders Antonsen	5	2	3	–1
(Denmark) Viktor Axelsen	12	5	7	–2
(Denmark) Peter Gade	8	1	7	–6
(Denmark) Jan Ø. Jørgensen	6	3	3	0
(Denmark) Hans-Kristian Vittinghus	9	6	3	+3
(England) Rajiv Ouseph	4	2	2	0
(India) Parupalli Kashyap	9	7	2	+5
(India) Srikanth Kidambi	12	7	5	+2

Player	Matches	Win	Lost	Diff.
(India) B. Sai Praneeth	4	4	0	+4
(India) Lakshya Sen	1	1	0	+1
(Indonesia) Anthony Sinisuka Ginting	4	3	1	+2
(Indonesia) Taufik Hidayat	3	0	3	–3
(Indonesia) Sony Dwi Kuncoro	5	2	3	–1
(Indonesia) Tommy Sugiarto	9	7	2	+5
(Japan) Kento Momota	11	5	6	–1
(Japan) Sho Sasaki	6	5	1	+4
(Malaysia) Lee Chong Wei	15	3	12	–9
(Malaysia) Liew Daren	6	4	2	+2
(Malaysia) Wong Choong Hann	2	1	1	0
(South Korea) Heo Kwang-hee	3	2	1	+1
(South Korea) Lee Hyun-il	7	4	3	+1
(Thailand) Boonsak Ponsana	2	1	1	0
(Thailand) Kantaphon Wangcharoen	3	3	0	+3
(Vietnam) Nguyễn Tiến Minh	7	4	3	+1
