= Alistair Casey =

Scottish badminton player (born 1981)

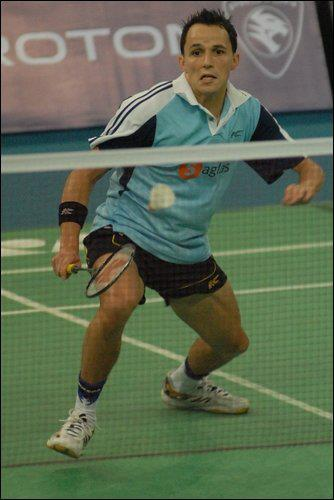
- Casey at the 2007 BWF World Championships

Personal information
- Born: 23 February 1981 (age 45) Glasgow, Scotland
- Years active: 1999-Current
- Height: 1.70 m (5 ft 7 in)
- Weight: 69 kg (152 lb; 10.9 st)

Sport
- Country: Scotland
- Sport: Badminton
- Handedness: Right

Men's
- Highest ranking: 62 (MS) 16 Sep 2010; 92 (MD) 2 Sep 2011; 171 (XD) 30 Apr 2015
- BWF profile

Alistair Casey (born 23 February 1981) is a Scottish Capped Professional badminton player.

== Playing career ==
In 2011 he went out in the first round of the World Championships but was runner up at the Mexico International and Semi Finalist of the Suriname International. In 2012 he was the winner of both the Botswana and South Africa Internationals.

== Achievements ==
=== BWF International Challenge/Series ===
Men's singles

Year	Tournament	Opponent	Score	Result
2012	South Africa International	(South Africa) Willem Viljoen	26–24, 20–22, 21–18	(gold) Winner
2012	Botswana International	(South Africa) Andries Malan	21–13, 21–7	(gold) Winner
2012	Carebaco International	(New Zealand) Joe Wu	19–21, 15–21	(silver) Runner-up
2011	Mexico International	(Peru) Rodrigo Pacheco	19–21, 13–21	(silver) Runner-up
2010	Tahiti International	(Italy) Rosario Maddaloni	21–17, 21–18	(gold) Winner
2010	Kenya International	(India) Oscar Bansal	21–14, 13–21, 19–21	(silver) Runner-up
2008	Mongolia International	(Mongolia) Enkhbat Olonbayar	21–18, 21–11	(gold) Winner
2006	Samoa International	(Australia) Jeff Tho		(gold) Winner

Men's doubles

Year	Tournament	Partner	Opponent	Score	Result
2012	Guatemala International	(Mexico) Andres Quadri	(Guatemala) Jonathan Solis (Guatemala) Rodolfo Ramirez	14–21, 21–16, 13–21	(silver) Runner-up
2010	Colombia International	(United States) Mathew Fogarty	(Peru) Pablo Aguilar (Peru) Bruno Monteverde	11–21, 21–18, 19–21	(silver) Runner-up
2008	Mongolia International	(Austria) Clemens Michael Smola	(Mongolia) Davaasuren Battur (Mongolia) Zolzaya Munkhbaatar	21–15, 22–20	(gold) Winner
2006	Samoa International	(Australia) Jeff Tho	(Australia) Ashley Brehaut (Australia) Aji Basuki Sindoro		(silver) Runner-up

BWF International Challenge tournament
BWF International Series tournament
BWF Future Series tournament

== Coaching career ==
Casey coached for the U.S. Olympic Team at the 2016 Summer Olympics in Rio de Janeiro. He was also the coach and team leader for the USA Badminton team at the 2020 Summer Olympics in Tokyo.

Casey is the coach of the Polytechnic School Badminton team. They compete in the CIF Southern Section.
