= 2014 BWF Super Series =

Tournament details
- Dates: 7 January – 21 December
- Edition: 8th

The 2014 BWF Super Series, officially known as the 2014 Metlife BWF Super Series for sponsorship reasons, was the eighth season of the BWF Super Series. For this season, an annual US$400,000 of player incentive scheme bonus payment shared among the year-end top 10 players/pairs once they fulfil various media and sponsorship commitments.

== Schedule ==
Below is the schedule released by the Badminton World Federation:

Tour	Official title	Venue	City	Date		Prize money USD	Report
Tour	Official title	Venue	City	Start	Finish	Prize money USD	Report
1	(South Korea) Korea Open Super Series	SK Handball Stadium	Seoul	January 7	January 12	600,000	Report
2	Malaysia Open Super Series Premier	Putra Indoor Stadium	Kuala Lumpur	January 14	January 19	500,000	Report
3	All England Super Series Premier	Arena Birmingham	Birmingham	March 4	March 9	400,000	Report
4	India Open Super Series	Siri Fort Sports Complex	New Delhi	April 1	April 6	250,000	Report
5	Singapore Super Series	Singapore Indoor Stadium	Singapore	April 8	April 13	300,000	Report
6	Japan Super Series	Tokyo Metropolitan Gymnasium	Tokyo	June 10	June 15	250,000	Report
7	Indonesia Open Super Series Premier	Istora Senayan	Jakarta	June 17	June 22	750,000	Report
8	(Australia) Australian Super Series	State Sports Centre	Sydney	June 24	June 29	750,000	Report
9	Denmark Super Series Premier	Odense Sports Park	Odense	October 14	October 19	600,000	Report
10	(France) French Super Series	Stade Pierre de Coubertin	Paris	October 21	October 26	275,000	Report
11	China Open Super Series Premier	Haixia Olympic Sports Center	Fuzhou	November 11	November 16	700,000	Report
12	Hong Kong Super Series	Hong Kong Coliseum	Kowloon	November 18	November 23	350,000	Report
13	(United Arab Emirates) Super Series Masters Finals	Hamdan Sports Complex	Dubai	December 17	December 21	1,000,000	Report

Super Series Premier
Super Series Finals

== Results ==
=== Winners ===
Tour	Men's singles	Women's singles	Men's doubles	Women's doubles	Mixed doubles
Korea	(China) Chen Long	(China) Wang Yihan	(Denmark) Mathias Boe (Denmark) Carsten Mogensen	(China) Bao Yixin (China) Tang Jinhua	(China) Zhang Nan (China) Zhao Yunlei
Malaysia	(Malaysia) Lee Chong Wei	(China) Li Xuerui	(Malaysia) Goh V Shem (Malaysia) Lim Khim Wah	(China) Bao Yixin (China) Tang Jinhua	(China) Xu Chen (China) Ma Jin
England	(Malaysia) Lee Chong Wei	(China) Wang Shixian	(Indonesia) Mohammad Ahsan (Indonesia) Hendra Setiawan	(China) Wang Xiaoli (China) Yu Yang	(Indonesia) Tontowi Ahmad (Indonesia) Liliyana Natsir
India	(Malaysia) Lee Chong Wei	(China) Wang Shixian	(Denmark) Mathias Boe (Denmark) Carsten Mogensen	(China) Tang Yuanting (China) Yu Yang	(Denmark) Joachim Fischer Nielsen (Denmark) Christinna Pedersen
Singapore	(Indonesia) Simon Santoso	(China) Wang Yihan	(China) Cai Yun (China) Lu Kai	(China) Bao Yixin (China) Tang Jinhua	(Indonesia) Tontowi Ahmad (Indonesia) Liliyana Natsir
Japan	(Malaysia) Lee Chong Wei	(China) Li Xuerui	(South Korea) Lee Yong-dae (South Korea) Yoo Yeon-seong	(Japan) Misaki Matsutomo (Japan) Ayaka Takahashi	(China) Zhang Nan (China) Zhao Yunlei
Indonesia	(Denmark) Jan Ø. Jørgensen	(China) Li Xuerui	(South Korea) Lee Yong-dae (South Korea) Yoo Yeon-seong	(China) Tian Qing (China) Zhao Yunlei	(Denmark) Joachim Fischer Nielsen (Denmark) Christinna Pedersen
Australia	(China) Lin Dan	(India) Saina Nehwal	(South Korea) Lee Yong-dae (South Korea) Yoo Yeon-seong	(China) Tian Qing (China) Zhao Yunlei	(South Korea) Ko Sung-hyun (South Korea) Kim Ha-na
Denmark	(China) Chen Long	(China) Li Xuerui	(China) Fu Haifeng (China) Zhang Nan	(China) Wang Xiaoli (China) Yu Yang	(China) Xu Chen (China) Ma Jin
France	(Chinese Taipei) Chou Tien-chen	(China) Wang Shixian	(Denmark) Mathias Boe (Denmark) Carsten Mogensen	(China) Wang Xiaoli (China) Yu Yang	(Indonesia) Tontowi Ahmad (Indonesia) Liliyana Natsir
China	(India) Srikanth Kidambi	(India) Saina Nehwal	(South Korea) Lee Yong-dae (South Korea) Yoo Yeon-seong	(China) Wang Xiaoli (China) Yu Yang	(China) Zhang Nan (China) Zhao Yunlei
Hong Kong	(South Korea) Son Wan-ho	(Chinese Taipei) Tai Tzu-ying	(Indonesia) Mohammad Ahsan (Indonesia) Hendra Setiawan	(China) Tian Qing (China) Zhao Yunlei	(China) Zhang Nan (China) Zhao Yunlei
Masters Finals	(China) Chen Long	(Chinese Taipei) Tai Tzu-ying	(South Korea) Lee Yong-dae (South Korea) Yoo Yeon-seong	(Japan) Misaki Matsutomo (Japan) Ayaka Takahashi	(China) Zhang Nan (China) Zhao Yunlei

=== Performance by countries ===
Tabulated below are the Super Series performances based on countries. Only countries who have won a title are listed:

Team	KOR	MAS	ENG	IND	SIN	JPN	INA	AUS	DEN	FRA	CHN	HKG	SSF	Total
China	4	3	2	2	3	2	2	2	5	2	2	2	2	33
Korea						1	1	2			1	1	1	7
Indonesia			2		2					1		1		6
Denmark	1			2			2			1				6
Malaysia		2	1	1		1								5
Chinese Taipei										1		1	1	3
India								1			2			3
Japan						1							1	2

== Finals ==
=== Korea ===
Category	Winners	Runners-up	Score
Men's singles	(China) Chen Long	(Malaysia) Lee Chong Wei	21–14, 21–15
Women's singles	(China) Wang Yihan	(Thailand) Ratchanok Intanon	21–13, 21–19
Men's doubles	(Denmark) Mathias Boe / Carsten Mogensen	(China) Fu Haifeng / Hong Wei	21–12, 21–17
Women's doubles	(China) Bao Yixin / Tang Jinhua	(China) Luo Ying / Luo Yu	21–17, 21–15
Mixed doubles	(China) Zhang Nan / Zhao Yunlei	(China) Xu Chen / Ma Jin	21–18, 21–18

=== Malaysia ===
Category	Winners	Runners-up	Score
Men's singles	(Malaysia) Lee Chong Wei	(Indonesia) Tommy Sugiarto	21–19, 21–9
Women's singles	(China) Li Xuerui	(China) Wang Shixian	21–16, 21–17
Men's doubles	(Malaysia) Goh V Shem / Lim Khim Wah	(China) Chai Biao / Hong Wei	21–19, 21–18
Women's doubles	(China) Bao Yixin / Tang Jinhua	(Japan) Misaki Matsutomo / Ayaka Takahashi	21–19, 14–21, 21–13
Mixed doubles	(China) Xu Chen / Ma Jin	(Denmark) Joachim Fischer Nielsen / Christinna Pedersen	21–11, 17–21, 21–13

=== England ===
Category	Winners	Runners-up	Score
Men's singles	(Malaysia) Lee Chong Wei	(China) Chen Long	21–13, 21–18
Women's singles	(China) Wang Shixian	(China) Li Xuerui	21–19, 21–18
Men's doubles	(Indonesia) Mohammad Ahsan / Hendra Setiawan	(Japan) Hiroyuki Endo / Kenichi Hayakawa	21–19, 21–19
Women's doubles	(China) Wang Xiaoli / Yu Yang	(China) Ma Jin / Tang Yuanting	21–17, 18–21, 23–21
Mixed doubles	(Indonesia) Tontowi Ahmad / Liliyana Natsir	(China) Zhang Nan / Zhao Yunlei	21–13, 21–17

=== India ===
Category	Winners	Runners-up	Score
Men's singles	(Malaysia) Lee Chong Wei	(China) Chen Long	21–13, 21–17
Women's singles	(China) Wang Shixian	(China) Li Xuerui	22–20, 21–19
Men's doubles	(Denmark) Mathias Boe / Carsten Mogensen	(China) Liu Xiaolong / Qiu Zihan	17–21, 21–15, 21–15
Women's doubles	(China) Tang Yuanting / Yu Yang	(South Korea) Jung Kyung-eun / Kim Ha-na	21–10, 13–21, 21–16
Mixed doubles	(Denmark) Joachim Fischer Nielsen / Christinna Pedersen	(South Korea) Ko Sung-hyun / Kim Ha-na	21–16, 18–21, 21–18

=== Singapore ===
Category	Winners	Runners-up	Score
Men's singles	(Indonesia) Simon Santoso	(Malaysia) Lee Chong Wei	21–15, 21–10
Women's singles	(China) Wang Yihan	(China) Li Xuerui	21–11, 21–19
Men's doubles	(China) Cai Yun / Lu Kai	(Chinese Taipei) Lee Sheng-mu / Tsai Chia-hsin	21–19, 21–14
Women's doubles	(China) Bao Yixin / Tang Jinhua	(Denmark) Christinna Pedersen / Kamilla Rytter Juhl	14–21, 21–19, 21–15
Mixed doubles	(Indonesia) Tontowi Ahmad / Liliyana Natsir	(Indonesia) Riky Widianto / Richi Puspita Dili	21–15, 22–20

=== Japan ===
Category	Winners	Runners-up	Score
Men's singles	(Malaysia) Lee Chong Wei	(Hong Kong) Hu Yun	21–14, 21–12
Women's singles	(China) Li Xuerui	(Chinese Taipei) Tai Tzu-ying	21–16, 21–6
Men's doubles	(South Korea) Lee Yong-dae / Yoo Yeon-seong	(Indonesia) Mohammad Ahsan / Hendra Setiawan	21–12, 26–24
Women's doubles	(Japan) Misaki Matsutomo / Ayaka Takahashi	(Japan) Reika Kakiiwa / Miyuki Maeda	21–13, 21–17
Mixed's doubles	(China) Zhang Nan / Zhao Yunlei	(Germany) Michael Fuchs / Birgit Michels	21–12, 21–16

=== Indonesia ===
Category	Winners	Runners-up	Score
Men's singles	(Denmark) Jan Ø. Jørgensen	(Japan) Kenichi Tago	21–18, 21–18
Women's singles	(China) Li Xuerui	(Thailand) Ratchanok Intanon	21–13, 21–13
Men's doubles	(South Korea) Lee Yong-dae / Yoo Yeon-seong	(Indonesia) Mohammad Ahsan / Hendra Setiawan	21–15, 21–17
Women's doubles	(China) Tian Qing / Zhao Yunlei	(China) Ma Jin / Tang Yuanting	Walkover
Mixed doubles	(Denmark) Joachim Fischer Nielsen / Christinna Pedersen	(China) Xu Chen / Ma Jin	18–21, 21–16, 21–14

=== Australia ===
Category	Winners	Runners-up	Score
Men's singles	(China) Lin Dan	(Indonesia) Simon Santoso	22–24, 21–16, 21–7
Women's singles	(India) Saina Nehwal	(Spain) Carolina Marín	21–18, 21–11
Men's doubles	(South Korea) Lee Yong-dae / Yoo Yeon-seong	(Chinese Taipei) Lee Sheng-mu / Tsai Chia-hsin	21–14, 21–18
Women's doubles	(China) Tian Qing / Zhao Yunlei	(Japan) Misaki Matsutomo / Ayaka Takahashi	21–15, 21–9
Mixed doubles	(South Korea) Ko Sung-hyun / Kim Ha-na	(Germany) Michael Fuchs / Birgit Michels	21–16, 21–17

=== Denmark ===
Category	Winners	Runners-up	Score
Men's singles	(China) Chen Long	(South Korea) Son Wan-ho	21–19, 24–22
Women's singles	(China) Li Xuerui	(China) Wang Yihan	21–17, 22–20
Men's doubles	(China) Fu Haifeng / Zhang Nan	(South Korea) Lee Yong-dae / Yoo Yeon-seong	21–13, 25–23
Women's doubles	(China) Wang Xiaoli / Yu Yang	(Japan) Misaki Matsutomo / Ayaka Takahashi	21–14, 21–14
Mixed doubles	(China) Xu Chen / Ma Jin	(Indonesia) Tontowi Ahmad / Liliyana Natsir	22–20, 21–15

=== France ===
Category	Winners	Runners-up	Score
Men's singles	(Chinese Taipei) Chou Tien-chen	(China) Wang Zhengming	10–21, 25–23, 21–19
Women's singles	(China) Wang Shixian	(China) Li Xuerui	21–15, 8–3 Retired
Men's doubles	(Denmark) Mathias Boe / Carsten Mogensen	(Japan) Hiroyuki Endo / Kenichi Hayakawa	18–21, 21–9, 21–7
Women's doubles	(China) Wang Xiaoli / Yu Yang	(China) Ma Jin / Tang Yuanting	21–15, 21–9
Mixed doubles	(Indonesia) Tontowi Ahmad / Liliyana Natsir	(England) Chris Adcock / Gabby Adcock	21–9, 21–16

=== China ===
Category	Winners	Runners-up	Score
Men's singles	(India) Srikanth Kidambi	(China) Lin Dan	21–19, 21–17
Women's singles	(India) Saina Nehwal	(Japan) Akane Yamaguchi	21–12, 22–20
Men's doubles	(South Korea) Lee Yong-dae / Yoo Yeon-seong	(China) Chai Biao / Hong Wei	21–14, 21–15
Women's doubles	(China) Wang Xiaoli / Yu Yang	(China) Tian Qing / Zhao Yunlei	21–16, 19–21, 22–20
Mixed doubles	(China) Zhang Nan / Zhao Yunlei	(South Korea) Yoo Yeon-seong / Eom Hye-won	23–25, 21–14, 21–18

=== Hong Kong ===
Category	Winners	Runners-up	Score
Men's singles	(South Korea) Son Wan-ho	(China) Chen Long	21–19, 21–16
Women's singles	(Chinese Taipei) Tai Tzu-ying	(Japan) Nozomi Okuhara	21–19, 21–11
Men's doubles	(Indonesia) Mohammad Ahsan / Hendra Setiawan	(China) Liu Xiaolong / Qiu Zihan	21–16, 17–21, 21–15
Women's doubles	(China) Tian Qing / Zhao Yunlei	(Japan) Misaki Matsutomo / Ayaka Takahashi	21–13, 21–13
Mixed doubles	(China) Zhang Nan / Zhao Yunlei	(China) Xu Chen / Ma Jin	21–14, 21–19

=== Masters Finals ===
Category	Winners	Runners-up	Score
Men's singles	(China) Chen Long	(Denmark) Hans-Kristian Vittinghus	21–16, 21–10
Women's singles	(Chinese Taipei) Tai Tzu-ying	(South Korea) Sung Ji-hyun	21–17, 21–12
Men's doubles	(South Korea) Lee Yong-dae / Yoo Yeon-seong	(China) Chai Biao / Hong Wei	19–21, 21–19, 21–16
Women's doubles	(Japan) Misaki Matsutomo / Ayaka Takahashi	(China) Tian Qing / Zhao Yunlei	21–17, 21–14
Mixed doubles	(China) Zhang Nan / Zhao Yunlei	(China) Liu Cheng / Bao Yixin	21–15, 21–12
