= 2015 BWF World Championships – Men's singles =

Badminton tournament results

Men's singles at the 2015 BWF World Championships
- Venue: Istora Senayan
- Location: Jakarta, Indonesia
- Dates: August 10, 2015 – August 16, 2015

Medalists
gold medal	Chen Long	China
silver medal	Lee Chong Wei	Malaysia
bronze medal	Kento Momota	Japan
bronze medal	Jan Ø. Jørgensen	Denmark

The men's singles tournament of the 2015 BWF World Championships (World Badminton Championships) took place from August 10 to 16, 2015. Chen Long successfully defended his title winning the World Championships for the second time in his career.

== Seeds ==
1. (China) Chen Long (champion)
2. (Denmark) Jan Ø. Jørgensen (semifinals)
3. (India) Srikanth Kidambi (third round)
4. (Japan) Kento Momota (semifinals)
5. (China) Lin Dan (quarterfinals)
6. (Chinese Taipei) Chou Tien-chen (first round)
7. (Denmark) Viktor Axelsen (quarterfinals)
8. (China) Wang Zhengming (third round)

9. (South Korea) Son Wan-ho (third round)
10. (India) Kashyap Parupalli (second round)
11. (India) H. S. Prannoy (third round)
12. (Germany) Marc Zwiebler (second round)
13. (Hong Kong) Hu Yun (quarterfinals)
14. (Denmark) Hans-Kristian Vittinghus (third round)
15. (Indonesia) Tommy Sugiarto (second round)
16. (England) Rajiv Ouseph (first round)

Click on the seed number of a player to go to their draw section.

== Draw ==
=== Finals ===
Quarterfinals
1	(China) Chen Long	21	30
7	(Denmark) Viktor Axelsen	18	29
4	(Japan) Kento Momota	21	21
(Hong Kong) Wei Nan	6	14
(Malaysia) Lee Chong Wei	21	21
13	(Hong Kong) Hu Yun	12	18
5	(China) Lin Dan	12	15
2	(Denmark) Jan Ø. Jørgensen	21	21

Semifinals
1	(China) Chen Long	21	21
4	(Japan) Kento Momota	9	15
(Malaysia) Lee Chong Wei	21	21
2	(Denmark) Jan Ø. Jørgensen	7	19

Final
1	(China) Chen Long	21	21
(Malaysia) Lee Chong Wei	14	17

=== Section 1 ===
First round
(Estonia) R Must	21	27
(Austria) L Wraber	10	25
16	(England) R Ouseph	16	12
(Thailand) T Saensomboonsuk	21	21
(Singapore) D Wong	21	13
(Belgium) Y Tan	14	8^{r}
7	(Denmark) V Axelsen	21	21
(Czech Republic) P Koukal	14	11
(Poland) A Dziolko	20	22	21
(Russia) V Malkov	22	20	16
11	(India) H. S. Prannoy	21	21
(Brazil) A Y Tjong	12	16
(Uganda) E Ekiring	21	21
(Ukraine) D Zavadsky	18	17

Second round
1	(China) Chen L	21	21
(Estonia) R Must	15	7
(Thailand) T Saensomboonsuk	21	21
(Singapore) D Wong	12	14
7	(Denmark) V Axelsen	21	21
(Poland) A Dziolko	13	15
11	(India) H. S. Prannoy	21	21
(Uganda) E Ekiring	14	19

Third round
1	(China) Chen L	21	21
(Thailand) T Saensomboonsuk	17	18
7	(Denmark) V Axelsen	21	19	21
11	(India) H. S. Prannoy	16	21	18

Quarterfinals
1	(China) Chen L	21	30
7	(Denmark) V Axelsen	18	29

=== Section 2 ===
First round
4	(Japan) K Momota	21	21
(Germany) D Domke	17	8
(France) T Rouxel	15	21	12
(Canada) M Giuffre	21	16	21
10	(India) K Parupalli	21	21
(Netherlands) E Meijs	17	10
(South Korea) Lee D-k	13	22	15
(Vietnam) Nguyễn TM	21	20	21
6	(Chinese Taipei) Chou T-c	5	20
(Malaysia) Z Zulkiffli	21	22
(Finland) E Heino	22	9	16
(Republic of Ireland) S Evans	20	21	21
15	(Indonesia) T Sugiarto	21	21
(Spain) P Abián	16	13
(United States) H Shu	19	26	18
(Hong Kong) Wei N	21	24	21

Second round
4	(Japan) K Momota	21	21
(Canada) M Giuffre	14	9
10	(India) K Parupalli	21	13	18
(Vietnam) Nguyễn TM	17	21	21
(Malaysia) Z Zulkiffli	21	21
(Republic of Ireland) S Evans	16	13
15	(Indonesia) T Sugiarto	24	21	20
(Hong Kong) Wei N	26	8	22

Third round
4	(Japan) K Momota	21	21
(Vietnam) Nguyễn TM	15	16
(Malaysia) Z Zulkiffli	15	9
(Hong Kong) Wei N	21	21

Quarterfinals
4	(Japan) K Momota	21	21
(Hong Kong) Wei N	6	14

=== Section 3 ===
First round
(Malaysia) Lee CW	21	21
(Lithuania) K Navickas	9	13
(Cuba) O Guerrero	16	13
12	(Germany) M Zwiebler	21	21
(France) B Leverdez	21	21	13
(England) T Penty	23	18	21
(Sweden) H Hurskainen	13	12
8	(China) Wang ZM	21	21
(Poland) M Rogalski	22	21
(Japan) K Tago	20	12
(Italy) R Maddaloni	15	13
13	(Hong Kong) Hu Y	21	21
(Chinese Taipei) Hsu J-h	21	21
(Israel) M Zilberman	14	14
(Australia) M Fariman	10	13
3	(India) S Kidambi	21	21

Second round
(Malaysia) Lee CW	21	17	21
12	(Germany) M Zwiebler	14	21	8
(England) T Penty	16	21	13
8	(China) Wang ZM	21	19	21
(Poland) M Rogalski	18	21	13
13	(Hong Kong) Hu Y	21	13	21
(Chinese Taipei) Hsu J-h	14	15
3	(India) S Kidambi	21	21

Third round
(Malaysia) Lee CW	21	21
8	(China) Wang ZM	17	19
13	(Hong Kong) Hu Y	14	21	23
3	(India) S Kidambi	21	17	21

Quarterfinals
(Malaysia) Lee CW	21	21
13	(Hong Kong) Hu Y	12	18

=== Section 4 ===
First round
(Japan) S Sasaki	21	21
(Ukraine) A Pochtarov	11	11
(Scotland) K Merrilees	16	15
14	(Denmark) H K Vittinghus	21	21
(Brazil) D Paiola	21	11	24
(Austria) D Obernosterer	14	21	22
(United States) S Pongnairat	8	11
5	(China) Lin D	21	21
(Indonesia) D H Rumbaka
(Guatemala) K Cordón	w	/	o
(Finland) V Lang	13	14
9	(South Korea) Son W-h	21	21
(Norway) M Myhre	18	19
(Czech Republic) M Ludík	21	21
(Thailand) B Ponsana	9	19
2	(Denmark) J Ø. Jørgensen	21	21

Second round
(Japan) S Sasaki	15	10
14	(Denmark) H K Vittinghus	21	21
(Brazil) D Paiola	14	14
5	(China) Lin D	21	21
(Indonesia) D H Rumbaka	21	13	17
9	(South Korea) Son W-h	12	21	21
(Czech Republic) M Ludík	18	12
2	(Denmark) J Ø. Jørgensen	21	21

Third round
14	(Denmark) H K Vittinghus	9	13
5	(China) Lin D	21	21
9	(South Korea) Son W-h	19	11
2	(Denmark) J Ø. Jørgensen	21	21

Quarterfinals
5	(China) Lin D	12	15
2	(Denmark) J Ø. Jørgensen	21	21
