= 2017 BWF World Championships – Men's singles =

Badminton tournament results

Men's singles at the BWF World Championships
- Venue: Emirates Arena
- Location: Glasgow, Scotland
- Dates: 21–27 August

Medalists
gold medal	Viktor Axelsen	Denmark
silver medal	Lin Dan	China
bronze medal	Son Wan-ho	South Korea
bronze medal	Chen Long	China

The men's singles tournament of the 2017 BWF World Championships (World Badminton Championships) took place from 21 to 27 August.

== Seeds ==
1. (South Korea) Son Wan-ho (semifinals)
2. (Malaysia) Lee Chong Wei (first round)
3. (Denmark) Viktor Axelsen (champion)
4. (China) Shi Yuqi (third round)
5. (China) Chen Long (semifinals)
6. (Chinese Taipei) Chou Tien-chen (quarterfinals)
7. (China) Lin Dan (final)
8. (India) Srikanth Kidambi (quarterfinals)

9. (Hong Kong) Ng Ka Long Angus (third round)
10. (China) Tian Houwei (quarterfinals)
11. (Thailand) Tanongsak Saensomboonsuk (third round)
12. (Hong Kong) Wong Wing Ki (quarterfinals)
13. (India) Ajay Jayaram (third round)
14. (Denmark) Anders Antonsen (third round)
15. (India) B. Sai Praneeth (third round)
16. (England) Rajiv Ouseph (third round)

Click on the seed number of a player to go to their draw section.

== Draw ==
=== Finals ===
Semifinals
1	(South Korea) Son Wan-ho	17	14
7	(China) Lin Dan	21	21
3	(Denmark) Viktor Axelsen	21	21
5	(China) Chen Long	9	10

Final
7	(China) Lin Dan	20	16
3	(Denmark) Viktor Axelsen	22	21

=== Section 1 ===
First round
1	(South Korea) Son W-h	21	21
(Finland) K Koljonen	14	16
(Hungary) G Krausz	18	21	21
(Austria) V Vattanirappel	21	11	7
11	(Thailand) T Saensomboonsuk	20	21	21
(Netherlands) N Fransman	22	12	6
(Malaysia) Z Zulkiffli	8	21	21
(Ukraine) A Pochtarev	21	13	13
8	(India) S Kidambi	21	21
(Russia) S Sirant	13	12
(France) L Corvée	18	21	21
(Chinese Taipei) Lin Y-h	21	17	13
14	(Denmark) A Antonsen	21	21
(Germany) F Roth	15	16
(Indonesia) T Sugiarto	21	21
(Hong Kong) Hu Y	16	15

Second round
1	(South Korea) Son W-h	21	21
(Hungary) G Krausz	13	9
11	(Thailand) T Saensomboonsuk	21	21
(Malaysia) Z Zulkiffli	18	13
8	(India) S Kidambi	21	21
(France) L Corvée	9	17
14	(Denmark) A Antonsen	21	21
(Indonesia) T Sugiarto	15	9

Third round
1	(South Korea) Son W-h	21	17	21
11	(Thailand) T Saensomboonsuk	14	21	13
8	(India) S Kidambi	21	21
14	(Denmark) A Antonsen	14	18

Quarterfinals
1	(South Korea) Son W-h	21	21
8	(India) S Kidambi	14	18

=== Section 2 ===
First round
4	(China) Shi YQ	23	22
(Republic of Ireland) S Evans	21	20
(Norway) M Myhre	18	21	10
(Brazil) Y Coelho	21	16	21
12	(Hong Kong) Wong W K	21	21
(Egypt) A Salah	15	11
(Mexico) L R Garrido	4	16
(Japan) K Tsuneyama	21	21
7	(China) Lin D	21	21
(Scotland) K Merrilees	15	10
(Sweden) F Burestedt	13	8
(Denmark) E Holst	21	21
16	(England) R Ouseph	21	21
(Czech Republic) A Mendrek	15	13
(Spain) P Abian	8	4^{r}
(India) S Verma	21	17

Second round
4	(China) Shi YQ	21	21	21
(Brazil) Y Coelho	17	23	10
12	(Hong Kong) Wong W K	21	21	26
(Japan) K Tsuneyama	23	15	24
7	(China) Lin D	19	21	21
(Denmark) E Holst	21	8	16
16	(England) R Ouseph	22	21
(India) S Verma	20	9

Third round
4	(China) Shi YQ	13	21	16
12	(Hong Kong) Wong W K	21	15	21
7	(China) Lin D	14	21	21
16	(England) R Ouseph	21	17	16

Quarterfinals
12	(Hong Kong) Wong W K	17	18
7	(China) Lin D	21	21

=== Section 3 ===
First round
(Poland) M Dubowski	12	14
(Indonesia) A S Ginting	21	21
(Hong Kong) Wei N	18	17
15	(India) B. S Praneeth	21	21
(United States) B Seguin	10	15
(Germany) M Zwiebler	21	21
(England) T Penty	13	21	14
6	(Chinese Taipei) Chou T-c	21	10	21
(Italy) R Maddaloni	21	21
(Australia) P S Low	19	4
(Belgium) M Moreels	9	12
9	(Hong Kong) Ng K L	21	21
(Estonia) R Must	20	21	15
(Finland) E Heino	22	16	21
(Japan) T Ueda	21	6	13
3	(Denmark) V Axelsen	17	21	21

Second round
(Indonesia) A S Ginting	21	18	19
15	(India) B. S Praneeth	14	21	21
(Germany) M Zwiebler	22	18	14
6	(Chinese Taipei) Chou T-c	20	21	21
(Italy) R Maddaloni	10	15
9	(Hong Kong) Ng K L	21	21
(Finland) E Heino	17	15
3	(Denmark) V Axelsen	21	21

Third round
15	(India) B. S Praneeth	21	10	12
6	(Chinese Taipei) Chou T-c	19	21	21
9	(Hong Kong) Ng K L	17	13
3	(Denmark) V Axelsen	21	21

Quarterfinals
6	(Chinese Taipei) Chou T-c	18	22	16
3	(Denmark) V Axelsen	21	20	21

=== Section 4 ===
First round
(Netherlands) M Caljouw	21	21
(Sri Lanka) N Karunaratne	17	6
(Austria) L Wraber	14	12
13	(India) A Jayaram	21	21
(Indonesia) S D Kuncoro	21	21
(Czech Republic) M Ludík	16	7
(Mauritius) G J Paul	7	9
5	(China) Chen L	21	21
(Scotland) M Carder	19	11
(Russia) V Malkov	21	21
(Denmark) H-K Vittinghus	14	21	16
10	(China) Tian HW	21	17	21
(Israel) M Zilberman	14	19
(Croatia) Z Đurkinjak	21	21
(France) B Leverdez	21	22	21
2	(Malaysia) Lee C W	19	24	17

Second round
(Netherlands) M Caljouw	13	18
13	(India) A Jayaram	21	21
(Indonesia) S D Kuncoro	13	9
5	(China) Chen L	21	21
(Russia) V Malkov	17	14
10	(China) Tian HW	21	21
(Croatia) Z Đurkinjak	21	19	20
(France) B Leverdez	16	21	22

Third round
13	(India) A Jayaram	11	10
5	(China) Chen L	21	21
10	(China) Tian HW	21	21
(France) B Leverdez	14	8

Quarterfinals
5	(China) Chen L	21	21
10	(China) Tian HW	12	17
