= 2012 BWF Super Series Finals =

Tournament details
- Dates: 12 December 2012 - 14 December 2012
- Total prize money: US$500,000
- Venue: Shenzhen Bay Sports Center
- Location: Shenzhen, China

Champions
- Men's singles: (China) Chen Long
- Women's singles: (China) Li Xuerui
- Men's doubles: (Denmark) Mathias Boe (Denmark) Carsten Mogensen
- Women's doubles: (China) Wang Xiaoli (China) Yu Yang
- Mixed doubles: (Denmark) Joachim Fischer Nielsen (Denmark) Christinna Pedersen

The 2012 BWF Super Series Finals was a top level badminton competition which was held from December 12 to December 16, 2012, in Shenzhen, China. The final was held by Chinese Badminton Association and sponsored by China Resources Land. It was the final event of the BWF Super Series competition on the 2012 BWF Super Series schedule. The total purse for the event was $500,000.

== Representatives by nation ==
Top Nations
Rank	Nation	MS	WS	MD	WD	XD	Total	Players
1	China	2	2	2	2	2	10	15^{§}
2	Japan	1	1	1	2	0	5	8
2	Malaysia	2	0	2	0	1	5	8
2	Thailand	1	1	1	1	1	5	8
5	Denmark	1	1	1	1	1	5	7^{§}
6	South Korea	0	1	1	1	1	4	6^{§}
7	Indonesia	0	0	0	0	2	2	4
8	Hong Kong	1	0	0	1	0	2	3
9	Germany	0	1	0	0	0	1	1
9	India	0	1	0	0	0	1	1
Total		8	8	8	8	8	40	61

§: Christinna Pedersen from Denmark, Zhao Yunlei from China and Jang Ye-na from Korea were the players who played in two categories (women's doubles and mixed doubles).

== Performance by nation ==
Nation	Group Phase	Semifinal	Final	Winner
China	10	10	6	3
Indonesia	2			
Japan	5	2	1	
South Korea	4			
Denmark	5	4	3	2
Thailand	5	2		
Malaysia	5			
India	1	1		
Germany	1			
Hong Kong	2	1		

== Men's singles ==
=== Group A ===
Athlete	Pts	Pld	W	L	SF	SA	PF	PA
(China) Du Pengyu	2	2	2	0	4	1	110	92
(Hong Kong) Hu Yun	1	2	1	1	2	3	100	91
(Thailand) Boonsak Ponsana	0	2	0	2	2	4	100	127
(Malaysia) Lee Chong Wei	0	0	0	0	0	0	0	0

Note: Lee Chong Wei withdrew due to injury.

Date		Score		Set 1	Set 2	Set 3
12 Dec	(Hong Kong) Hu Yun	2–1	(Thailand) Boonsak Ponsana	19-21	21–17	21-9
12 Dec	(China) Du Pengyu	2–1	(Malaysia) Lee Chong Wei	12-21	21-16	22–20
13 Dec	(China) Du Pengyu	2–0	(Hong Kong) Hu Yun	21–18	23–21	
14 Dec	(China) Du Pengyu	2–1	(Thailand) Boonsak Ponsana	24-22	21–23	21-8
	(Hong Kong) Hu Yun	WO	(Malaysia) Lee Chong Wei			
	(Thailand) Boonsak Ponsana	WO	(Malaysia) Lee Chong Wei			

=== Group B ===
Athlete	Pts	Pld	W	L	SF	SA	PF	PA
(China) Chen Long	3	3	3	0	6	3	183	144
(Denmark) Hans-Kristian Vittinghus	1	3	1	2	4	4	138	152
(Japan) Kenichi Tago	1	3	1	2	3	4	124	131
(Malaysia) Liew Daren	1	3	1	2	3	5	137	155

Date		Score		Set 1	Set 2	Set 3
12 Dec	(Japan) Kenichi Tago	2–0	(Malaysia) Liew Daren	21–15	21-18	
12 Dec	(China) Chen Long	2–1	(Denmark) Hans-Kristian Vittinghus	20-22	21–15	21–11
13 Dec	(China) Chen Long	2–1	(Malaysia) Liew Daren	23-25	21–8	21–12
13 Dec	(Denmark) Hans-Kristian Vittinghus	2–0	(Japan) Kenichi Tago	21–18	21–13	
14 Dec	(China) Chen Long	2–1	(Japan) Kenichi Tago	21–15	14–21	21-15
14 Dec	(Malaysia) Liew Daren	2–1	(Denmark) Hans-Kristian Vittinghus	17-21	21–13	21-14

=== Finals ===
Semifinals
(China) Du Pengyu	21	21	21
(Denmark) Hans-Kristian Vittinghus	23	8	13
(Hong Kong) Hu Yun	10	18
(China) Chen Long	21	21

Final
(China) Du Pengyu	12	13
(China) Chen Long	21	21

== Women's singles ==
=== Group A ===
Athlete	Pts	Pld	W	L	SF	SA	PF	PA
(China) Li Xuerui	3	3	3	0	6	1	145	117
(China) Wang Shixian	2	3	2	1	5	3	150	146
(South Korea) Sung Ji-hyun	1	3	1	2	2	4	101	111
(Japan) Eriko Hirose	0	3	0	3	1	6	116	138

Date		Score		Set 1	Set 2	Set 3
12 Dec	(China) Li Xuerui	2–1	(China) Wang Shixian	21-19	15-21	21-18
12 Dec	(South Korea) Sung Ji-hyun	2–0	(Japan) Eriko Hirose	21–12	21–15	
13 Dec	(China) Wang Shixian	2–0	(South Korea) Sung Ji-hyun	21-19	21–19	
13 Dec	(China) Li Xuerui	2–0	(Japan) Eriko Hirose	25-23	21–15	
14 Dec	(China) Li Xuerui	2–0	(South Korea) Sung Ji-hyun	21–9	21–12	
14 Dec	(China) Wang Shixian	2–1	(Japan) Eriko Hirose	21-15	8-21	21–15

=== Group B ===
Athlete	Pts	Pld	W	L	SF	SA	PF	PA
(Thailand) Ratchanok Intanon	3	3	3	0	6	0	127	95
(India) Saina Nehwal	1	3	1	2	3	4	125	120
(Denmark) Tine Baun	1	3	1	2	3	5	127	152
(Germany) Juliane Schenk	1	3	1	2	2	5	118	130

Date		Score		Set 1	Set 2	Set 3
12 Dec	(Denmark) Tine Baun	2–1	(India) Saina Nehwal	21-14	11-21	21-19
12 Dec	(Thailand) Ratchanok Intanon	2–0	(Germany) Juliane Schenk	21-17	22-20	
13 Dec	(Germany) Juliane Schenk	2–1	(Denmark) Tine Baun	14-21	21-16	21-8
13 Dec	(Thailand) Ratchanok Intanon	2–0	(India) Saina Nehwal	21-13	21-16	
14 Dec	(India) Saina Nehwal	2–0	(Germany) Juliane Schenk	21-7	21-18	
14 Dec	(Thailand) Ratchanok Intanon	2–0	(Denmark) Tine Baun	21-15	21-14	

=== Finals ===
Semifinals
(China) Li Xuerui	22	7	21
(India) Saina Nehwal	20	21	13
(China) Wang Shixian	21	21
(Thailand) Ratchanok Intanon	12	19

Final
(China) Li Xuerui	21	15
(China) Wang Shixian	9	4^{r}

== Men's doubles ==
=== Group A ===
Athlete	Pts	Pld	W	L	SF	SA	PF	PA
(Denmark) Mathias Boe (Denmark) Carsten Mogensen	1	2	1	1	3	3	114	102
(China) Cai Yun (China) Fu Haifeng	1	2	1	1	3	3	99	98
(Malaysia) Koo Kien Keat (Malaysia) Tan Boon Heong	1	2	1	1	3	3	99	110
(South Korea) Kim Ki-jung (South Korea) Kim Sa-rang	0	0	0	0	0	0	0	0

Note: Kim Ki-jung/Kim Sa-rang withdrew from the competition.

Date		Score		Set 1	Set 2	Set 3
12 Dec	(Denmark) Mathias Boe (Denmark) Carsten Mogensen	2-0	(South Korea) Kim Ki-jung (South Korea) Kim Sa-rang	21–17	17-9 ret.	
12 Dec	(China) Cai Yun (China) Fu Haifeng	2–1	(Malaysia) Koo Kien Keat (Malaysia) Tan Boon Heong	21–11	10–21	21–10
13 Dec	(Malaysia) Koo Kien Keat (Malaysia) Tan Boon Heong	2–1	(Denmark) Mathias Boe (Denmark) Carsten Mogensen	21-19	15-21	21-18
14 Dec	(Denmark) Mathias Boe (Denmark) Carsten Mogensen	2–1	(China) Cai Yun (China) Fu Haifeng	14-21	21-12	21-14
	(Malaysia) Koo Kien Keat (Malaysia) Tan Boon Heong	WO	(South Korea) Kim Ki-jung (South Korea) Kim Sa-rang			
	(China) Cai Yun (China) Fu Haifeng	WO	(South Korea) Kim Ki-jung (South Korea) Kim Sa-rang			

=== Group B ===
Athlete	Pts	Pld	W	L	SF	SA	PF	PA
(Japan) Hiroyuki Endo (Japan) Kenichi Hayakawa	3	3	3	0	6	1	139	109
(China) Hong Wei (China) Shen Ye	2	3	2	1	5	2	143	106
(Malaysia) Hoon Thien How (Malaysia) Tan Wee Kiong	1	3	1	2	2	4	105	98
(Thailand) Bodin Issara (Thailand) Maneepong Jongjit	0	3	0	3	0	6	52	126

Date		Score		Set 1	Set 2	Set 3
12 Dec	(China) Hong Wei (China) Shen Ye	2–0	(Thailand) Bodin Issara (Thailand) Maneepong Jongjit	21-9	21–9	
12 Dec	(Japan) Hiroyuki Endo (Japan) Kenichi Hayakawa	2–0	(Malaysia) Hoon Thien How (Malaysia) Tan Wee Kiong	21–13	21-17	
13 Dec	(Japan) Hiroyuki Endo (Japan) Kenichi Hayakawa	2–0	(Thailand) Bodin Issara (Thailand) Maneepong Jongjit	21–11	21–9	
13 Dec	(China) Hong Wei (China) Shen Ye	2–0	(Malaysia) Hoon Thien How (Malaysia) Tan Wee Kiong	21-17	21–16	
14 Dec	(Japan) Hiroyuki Endo (Japan) Kenichi Hayakawa	2–1	(China) Hong Wei (China) Shen Ye	22-20	12-21	21-18
14 Dec	(Malaysia) Hoon Thien How (Malaysia) Tan Wee Kiong	2–0	(Thailand) Bodin Issara (Thailand) Maneepong Jongjit	21–9	21–5	

=== Finals ===
Semifinals
(Denmark) Mathias Boe (Denmark) Carsten Mogensen	26	24	21
(China) Hong Wei (China) Shen Ye	24	26	15
(China) Cai Yun (China) Fu Haifeng	9^{r}
(Japan) Hiroyuki Endo (Japan) Kenichi Hayakawa	13

Final
(Denmark) Mathias Boe (Denmark) Carsten Mogensen	21	21
(Japan) Hiroyuki Endo (Japan) Kenichi Hayakawa	17	19

== Women's doubles ==
=== Group A ===
Athlete	Pts	Pld	W	L	SF	SA	PF	PA
(China) Tian Qing (China) Zhao Yunlei	3	3	3	0	6	0	126	72
(Japan) Shizuka Matsuo (Japan) Mami Naito	2	3	2	1	4	3	135	113
(Thailand) Duanganong Aroonkesorn (Thailand) Kunchala Voravichitchaikul	1	3	1	2	3	4	117	121
(Hong Kong) Poon Lok Yan (Hong Kong) Tse Ying Suet	0	3	0	3	0	6	54	126

Date		Score		Set 1	Set 2	Set 3
12 Dec	(China) Tian Qing (China) Zhao Yunlei	2–0	(Thailand) Duanganong Aroonkesorn (Thailand) Kunchala Voravichitchaikul	21–17	21–7	
12 Dec	(Japan) Shizuka Matsuo (Japan) Mami Naito	2–0	(Hong Kong) Poon Lok Yan (Hong Kong) Tse Ying Suet	21–12	21–8	
13 Dec	(Japan) Shizuka Matsuo (Japan) Mami Naito	2–1	(Thailand) Duanganong Aroonkesorn (Thailand) Kunchala Voravichitchaikul	21-11	18-21	21-19
13 Dec	(China) Tian Qing (China) Zhao Yunlei	2–0	(Hong Kong) Poon Lok Yan (Hong Kong) Tse Ying Suet	21–6	21–9	
14 Dec	(China) Tian Qing (China) Zhao Yunlei	2–0	(Japan) Shizuka Matsuo (Japan) Mami Naito	21–15	21–18	
14 Dec	(Thailand) Duanganong Aroonkesorn (Thailand) Kunchala Voravichitchaikul	2–0	(Hong Kong) Poon Lok Yan (Hong Kong) Tse Ying Suet	21–6	21–13	

=== Group B ===
Athlete	Pts	Pld	W	L	SF	SA	PF	PA
(China) Wang Xiaoli (China) Yu Yang	2	2	2	0	4	0	84	52
(Denmark) Christinna Pedersen (Denmark) Kamilla Rytter Juhl	1	2	1	1	2	2	76	75
(Japan) Misaki Matsutomo (Japan) Ayaka Takahashi	0	2	0	2	0	4	51	84
(South Korea) Eom Hye-won (South Korea) Jang Ye-na	0	0	0	0	0	0	0	0

Note: Eom Hye-won/Jang Ye-na withdrew due to injury of Jang Ye-na

Date		Score		Set 1	Set 2	Set 3
12 Dec	(China) Wang Xiaoli (China) Yu Yang	2–0	(Denmark) Christinna Pedersen (Denmark) Kamilla Rytter Juhl	21–16	21–18	
12 Dec	(Japan) Misaki Matsutomo (Japan) Ayaka Takahashi	WO	(South Korea) Eom Hye-won (South Korea) Jang Ye-na			
13 Dec	(China) Wang Xiaoli (China) Yu Yang	2–0	(Japan) Misaki Matsutomo (Japan) Ayaka Takahashi	21–9	21–9	
14 Dec	(Denmark) Christinna Pedersen (Denmark) Kamilla Rytter Juhl	2–0	(Japan) Misaki Matsutomo (Japan) Ayaka Takahashi	21–17	21–16	
	(China) Wang Xiaoli (China) Yu Yang	WO	(South Korea) Eom Hye-won (South Korea) Jang Ye-na			
	(Denmark) Christinna Pedersen (Denmark) Kamilla Rytter Juhl	WO	(South Korea) Eom Hye-won (South Korea) Jang Ye-na			

=== Finals ===
Semifinals
(China) Tian Qing (China) Zhao Yunlei	21	18	22
(Denmark) Christinna Pedersen (Denmark) Kamilla Rytter Juhl	19	21	24
(China) Wang Xiaoli (China) Yu Yang	21	21
(Japan) Shizuka Matsuo (Japan) Mami Naito	9	8

Final
(China) Wang Xiaoli (China) Yu Yang	21	21
(Denmark) Christinna Pedersen (Denmark) Kamilla Rytter Juhl	16	14

== Mixed doubles ==
=== Group A ===
Athlete	Pts	Pld	W	L	SF	SA	PF	PA
(China) Xu Chen (China) Ma Jin	2	2	2	0	4	1	102	72
(Thailand) Sudket Prapakamol (Thailand) Saralee Thoungthongkam	1	2	1	1	3	3	108	109
(Indonesia) Tontowi Ahmad (Indonesia) Liliyana Natsir	0	2	0	2	1	4	74	103
(South Korea) Yoo Yeon-seong (South Korea) Jang Ye-na	0	0	0	0	0	0	0	0

Note: Yoo Yeon-seong/Jang Ye-na withdrew due to injury of Jang Ye-na

Date		Score		Set 1	Set 2	Set 3
12 Dec	(Thailand) Sudket Prapakamol (Thailand) Saralee Thoungthongkam	2–1	(Indonesia) Tontowi Ahmad (Indonesia) Liliyana Natsir	19-21	21-14	21-14
12 Dec	(China) Xu Chen (China) Ma Jin	WO	(South Korea) Yoo Yeon-seong (South Korea) Jang Ye-na			
13 Dec	(China) Xu Chen (China) Ma Jin	2–1	(Thailand) Sudket Prapakamol (Thailand) Saralee Thoungthongkam	21-14	18-21	21-12
14 Dec	(China) Xu Chen (China) Ma Jin	2–0	(Indonesia) Tontowi Ahmad (Indonesia) Lilyana Natsir	21–14	21–11	
	(Indonesia) Tontowi Ahmad (Indonesia) Liliyana Natsir	WO	(South Korea) Yoo Yeon-seong (South Korea) Jang Ye-na			
	(China) Xu Chen (China) Ma Jin	WO	(South Korea) Yoo Yeon-seong (South Korea) Jang Ye-na			

=== Group B ===
Athlete	Pts	Pld	W	L	SF	SA	PF	PA
(Denmark) Joachim Fischer Nielsen (Denmark) Christinna Pedersen	3	3	3	0	6	0	128	89
(China) Zhang Nan (China) Zhao Yunlei	2	3	2	1	4	2	117	101
(Indonesia) Muhammad Rijal (Indonesia) Debby Susanto	1	3	1	2	2	4	97	121
(Malaysia) Chan Peng Soon (Malaysia) Goh Liu Ying	0	3	0	3	0	6	95	126

Date		Score		Set 1	Set 2	Set 3
12 Dec	(Denmark) Joachim Fischer Nielsen (Denmark) Christinna Pedersen	2–0	(China) Zhang Nan (China) Zhao Yunlei	21–12	23–21	
12 Dec	(Indonesia) Muhammad Rijal (Indonesia) Debby Susanto	2–0	(Malaysia) Chan Peng Soon (Malaysia) Goh Liu Ying	21-18	21-19	
13 Dec	(Denmark) Joachim Fischer Nielsen (Denmark) Christinna Pedersen	2–0	(Malaysia) Chan Peng Soon (Malaysia) Goh Liu Ying	21-16	21-8	
13 Dec	(China) Zhang Nan (China) Zhao Yunlei	2–0	(Indonesia) Muhammad Rijal (Indonesia) Debby Susanto	21–13	21–10	
14 Dec	(China) Zhang Nan (China) Zhao Yunlei	2–0	(Malaysia) Chan Peng Soon (Malaysia) Goh Liu Ying	21–17	21–17	
14 Dec	(Denmark) Joachim Fischer Nielsen (Denmark) Christinna Pedersen	2–0	(Indonesia) Muhammad Rijal (Indonesia) Debby Susanto	21–16	21–16	

=== Finals ===
Semifinals
(China) Xu Chen (China) Ma Jin	21	11	19
(China) Zhang Nan (China) Zhao Yunlei	16	21	21
(Thailand) Sudket Prapakamol (Thailand) Saralee Thoungthongkam	19	13
(Denmark) Joachim Fischer Nielsen (Denmark) Christinna Pedersen	21	21

Final
(China) Zhang Nan (China) Zhao Yunlei	21	12	14
(Denmark) Joachim Fischer Nielsen (Denmark) Christinna Pedersen	17	21	21
