= Badminton at the 2014 Asian Games =

- Venue: Gyeyang Gymnasium
- Dates: 20–29 September 2014
- Competitors: 221 from 19 nations

Badminton at the 2014 Asian Games was held in Gyeyang Gymnasium, Incheon, South Korea from 20 September to 29 September 2014.

Singles, doubles, and team events were contested for both men and women. Mixed Doubles were also contested.

== Schedule ==
P	Preliminary rounds	¼	Quarterfinals	½	Semifinals	F	Final

Event↓/Date →	20th Sat		21st Sun	22nd Mon	23rd Tue	24th Wed	25th Thu	26th Fri	27th Sat	28th Sun	29th Mon
Men's singles						P	P	P	¼	½	F
Men's doubles						P	P	¼	½	F	
Men's team	P		¼	½	F						
Women's singles						P	P	¼	½	F	
Women's doubles						P	¼	½	F		
Women's team	P	¼	½	F							
Mixed doubles							P	P	¼	½	F

== Medalists ==
Event	Gold	Silver	Bronze
Men's singles	Lin Dan; China	Chen Long; China	Lee Chong Wei; Malaysia
Men's singles	Lin Dan; China	Chen Long; China	Wei Nan; Hong Kong
Men's doubles	Indonesia; Mohammad Ahsan; Hendra Setiawan	South Korea; Lee Yong-dae; Yoo Yeon-seong	Malaysia; Goh V Shem; Tan Wee Kiong
Men's doubles	Indonesia; Mohammad Ahsan; Hendra Setiawan	South Korea; Lee Yong-dae; Yoo Yeon-seong	South Korea; Kim Gi-jung; Kim Sa-rang
Men's team	South Korea; Jeon Hyeok-jin; Kim Gi-jung; Kim Sa-rang; Ko Sung-hyun; Lee Dong-keun; Lee Hyun-il; Lee Yong-dae; Shin Baek-cheol; Son Wan-ho; Yoo Yeon-seong	China; Cai Yun; Chen Long; Fu Haifeng; Gao Huan; Lin Dan; Liu Xiaolong; Qiu Zihan; Tian Houwei; Xu Chen; Zhang Nan	Malaysia; Chan Peng Soon; Chong Wei Feng; Goh Soon Huat; Goh V Shem; Hoon Thien How; Lee Chong Wei; Lim Khim Wah; Tan Boon Heong; Tan Wee Kiong; Iskandar Zulkarnain Zainuddin
Men's team	South Korea; Jeon Hyeok-jin; Kim Gi-jung; Kim Sa-rang; Ko Sung-hyun; Lee Dong-keun; Lee Hyun-il; Lee Yong-dae; Shin Baek-cheol; Son Wan-ho; Yoo Yeon-seong	China; Cai Yun; Chen Long; Fu Haifeng; Gao Huan; Lin Dan; Liu Xiaolong; Qiu Zihan; Tian Houwei; Xu Chen; Zhang Nan	Chinese Taipei; Chen Hung-ling; Chou Tien-chen; Hsu Jen-hao; Hsueh Hsuan-yi; Lee Sheng-mu; Liang Jui-wei; Liao Kuan-hao; Liao Min-chun; Tsai Chia-hsin; Tseng Min-hao
Women's singles	Wang Yihan; China	Li Xuerui; China	Tai Tzu-ying; Chinese Taipei
Women's singles	Wang Yihan; China	Li Xuerui; China	Bae Yeon-ju; South Korea
Women's doubles	Indonesia; Nitya Krishinda Maheswari; Greysia Polii	Japan; Misaki Matsutomo; Ayaka Takahashi	Malaysia; Vivian Hoo; Woon Khe Wei
Women's doubles	Indonesia; Nitya Krishinda Maheswari; Greysia Polii	Japan; Misaki Matsutomo; Ayaka Takahashi	China; Tian Qing; Zhao Yunlei
Women's team	China; Bao Yixin; Li Xuerui; Liu Xin; Ma Jin; Tian Qing; Wang Shixian; Wang Xiaoli; Wang Yihan; Yu Yang; Zhao Yunlei	South Korea; Bae Yeon-ju; Chang Ye-na; Go Ah-ra; Jung Kyung-eun; Kim Ha-na; Kim Hyo-min; Kim So-yeong; Ko Eun-byul; Sung Ji-hyun; Yoo Hae-won	Japan; Yui Hashimoto; Reika Kakiiwa; Miyuki Maeda; Shizuka Matsuo; Misaki Matsutomo; Minatsu Mitani; Mami Naito; Ayaka Takahashi; Sayaka Takahashi; Akane Yamaguchi
Women's team	China; Bao Yixin; Li Xuerui; Liu Xin; Ma Jin; Tian Qing; Wang Shixian; Wang Xiaoli; Wang Yihan; Yu Yang; Zhao Yunlei	South Korea; Bae Yeon-ju; Chang Ye-na; Go Ah-ra; Jung Kyung-eun; Kim Ha-na; Kim Hyo-min; Kim So-yeong; Ko Eun-byul; Sung Ji-hyun; Yoo Hae-won	India; Pradnya Gadre; Tanvi Lad; Saina Nehwal; Ashwini Ponnappa; N. Sikki Reddy; P. V. Sindhu; P. C. Thulasi
Mixed doubles	China; Zhang Nan; Zhao Yunlei	Indonesia; Tontowi Ahmad; Liliyana Natsir	Indonesia; Praveen Jordan; Debby Susanto
Mixed doubles	China; Zhang Nan; Zhao Yunlei	Indonesia; Tontowi Ahmad; Liliyana Natsir	China; Xu Chen; Ma Jin

== Medal table ==
Rank	Nation	Gold	Silver	Bronze	Total
1	China (CHN)	4	3	2	9
2	Indonesia (INA)	2	1	1	4
3	South Korea (KOR)	1	2	2	5
4	Japan (JPN)	0	1	1	2
5	Malaysia (MAS)	0	0	4	4
6	Chinese Taipei (TPE)	0	0	2	2
7	Hong Kong (HKG)	0	0	1	1
7	India (IND)	0	0	1	1
Totals (8 entries)		7	7	14	28

== Participating nations ==
A total of 221 athletes from 19 nations competed in badminton at the 2014 Asian Games:

- Afghanistan (2)
- China (20)
- Chinese Taipei (20)
- Hong Kong (18)
- India (15)
- Indonesia (18)
- Iran (2)
- Japan (20)
- Macau (10)
- Malaysia (20)
- Maldives (8)
- Mongolia (4)
- Nepal (8)
- Pakistan (4)
- Qatar (1)
- Singapore (6)
- South Korea (20)
- Thailand (20)
- Vietnam (5)
