= Badminton at the 2014 Asian Games – Men's singles =

Men's singles at the 2014 Asian Games
- Venue: Gyeyang Gymnasium
- Dates: 24–29 September
- Competitors: 35 from 19 nations

Medalists
gold medal	Lin Dan	China
silver medal	Chen Long	China
bronze medal	Lee Chong Wei	Malaysia
bronze medal	Wei Nan	Hong Kong

The badminton Men's singles tournament at the 2014 Asian Games in Incheon took place from 24 September to 29 September at Gyeyang Gymnasium.

== Schedule ==
All times are Korea Standard Time (UTC+09:00)

Date	Time	Event
Wednesday, 24 September 2014	10:20	Round of 64
Thursday, 25 September 2014	10:20	Round of 32
Friday,26 September 2014	13:00	Round of 16
Saturday, 27 September 2014	13:00	Quarterfinals
Sunday, 28 September 2014	17:00	Semifinals
Monday, 29 September 2014	18:30	Gold medal match

== Results ==
=== Finals ===
Semifinals
1	Lee Chong Wei (MAS)	20	21	9
Lin Dan (CHN)	22	12	21
Wei Nan (HKG)	6	10
2	Chen Long (CHN)	21	21

Gold Medal Match
Lin Dan (CHN)	12	21	21
2	Chen Long (CHN)	21	16	16

=== Top half ===
==== Section 1 ====
Round of 64

Round of 32
1	Lee Chong Wei (MAS)	21	21
Umer Zeeshan (PAK)	14	6
Ahmad Shekib Iqbal (AFG)	6	6
Parupalli Kashyap (IND)	21	21
8	Boonsak Ponsana (THA)	10	15
Nguyễn Tiến Minh (VIE)	21	21
Ali Adel Al-Saadi (QAT)	3	2
Ihsan Maulana Mustofa (INA)	21	21

Round of 16
1	Lee Chong Wei (MAS)	21	21
Parupalli Kashyap (IND)	12	11
Nguyễn Tiến Minh (VIE)	21	21
Ihsan Maulana Mustofa (INA)	9	13

Quarterfinal
1	Lee Chong Wei (MAS)	21	21	21
Nguyễn Tiến Minh (VIE)	23	16	17

==== Section 2 ====
Round of 64
Lou Hok Man (MAC)	8	5
Lee Dong-keun (KOR)	21	21

Round of 32
3	Kenichi Tago (JPN)	21	21
Bikash Shrestha (NEP)	10	17
Nasheeu Sharafuddeen (MDV)	10	8
Hsu Jen-hao (TPE)	21	21
6	Hu Yun (HKG)	21	21
Mönkhbatyn Batdavaa (MGL)	7	14
Lin Dan (CHN)	21	28
Lee Dong-keun (KOR)	12	26

Round of 16
3	Kenichi Tago (JPN)	21	15	21
Hsu Jen-hao (TPE)	11	21	16
6	Hu Yun (HKG)	16	20
Lin Dan (CHN)	21	22

Quarterfinal
3	Kenichi Tago (JPN)	14	18
Lin Dan (CHN)	21	21

=== Bottom half ===
==== Section 3 ====
Round of 64
Irfan Saeed Bhatti (PAK)	16	22	21
Ratnajit Tamang (NEP)	21	20	19

Round of 32
Irfan Saeed Bhatti (PAK)	5	16
Derek Wong (SIN)	21	21
Sayed Imran Miri (AFG)	5	6
7	Chou Tien-chen (TPE)	21	21
Jargalsaikhany Gerelsükh (MGL)	6	12
Wei Nan (HKG)	21	21
Mohamed Ajfan Rasheed (MDV)	6	8
4	Tommy Sugiarto (INA)	21	21

Round of 16
Derek Wong (SIN)	15	14
7	Chou Tien-chen (TPE)	21	21
Wei Nan (HKG)	21	21	21
4	Tommy Sugiarto (INA)	17	23	16

Quarterfinal
7	Chou Tien-chen (TPE)	12	21	18
Wei Nan (HKG)	21	18	21

==== Section 4 ====
Round of 64
Iek U Ieong (MAC)	8	9
Phạm Cao Cường (VIE)	21	21

Round of 32
Phạm Cao Cường (VIE)	21	8
Srikanth Kidambi (IND)	23	21
Soroush Eskandari (IRI)	8	10
5	Son Wan-ho (KOR)	21	21
Tanongsak Saensomboonsuk (THA)	14	17
Kento Momota (JPN)	21	21
Chong Wei Feng (MAS)	7	13
2	Chen Long (CHN)	21	21

Round of 16
Srikanth Kidambi (IND)	21	11	18
5	Son Wan-ho (KOR)	19	21	21
Kento Momota (JPN)	19	6
2	Chen Long (CHN)	21	21

Quarterfinal
5	Son Wan-ho (KOR)	16	19
2	Chen Long (CHN)	21	21
