= BWF Super Series Finals =

Annual badminton tournament

The BWF Super Series Finals (named as BWF Super Series Masters Finals until 2009) was an annual badminton tournament held at the end of the year where the players with the most points from that calendar year's twelve events of the BWF Super Series competed for total prize money of at least US$ 1,000,000. It was replaced by BWF World Tour Finals in 2018.

== History ==
The Super Series Finals were cancelled in 2007 due to the lack of sponsorship for this tournament. The 2008 tournament – known at the time as the BWF Super Series Masters Finals 2008 – was the first edition and it was held in Kota Kinabalu, Sabah, Malaysia on December 18 to December 21, 2008.

Only the top eight players or pairs in the Super Series rankings after the final Super Series tournament, as announced by the Badminton World Federation, were eligible to participate; however it was limited to two entries per member association. In the tournament, eight players or pairs would be divided into two groups of four, with the top two players or pairs advanced to the semi-finals.

For the 2010 edition finals, the competition was held in January 2011. In 2014, the total prize money doubled to US$1 million. Dubai, United Arab Emirates was the venue for the Super Series Finals until 2017 as the result of Badminton World Federation partnership.

== Winners ==
Year	Host city	Men's singles	Women's singles	Men's doubles	Women's doubles	Mixed doubles	Ref
2007	Cancelled						
2008	Kota Kinabalu	(Malaysia) Lee Chong Wei	(Hong Kong) Zhou Mi	(Malaysia) Koo Kien Keat (Malaysia) Tan Boon Heong	(Malaysia) Chin Eei Hui (Malaysia) Wong Pei Tty	(Denmark) Thomas Laybourn (Denmark) Kamilla Rytter Juhl	
2009	Johor Bahru	(Malaysia) Lee Chong Wei	(Malaysia) Wong Mew Choo	(South Korea) Jung Jae-sung (South Korea) Lee Yong-dae	(Malaysia) Chin Eei Hui (Malaysia) Wong Pei Tty	(Denmark) Joachim Fischer Nielsen (Denmark) Christinna Pedersen	
2010	New Taipei	(Malaysia) Lee Chong Wei	(China) Wang Shixian	(Denmark) Mathias Boe (Denmark) Carsten Mogensen	(China) Wang Xiaoli (China) Yu Yang	(China) Zhang Nan (China) Zhao Yunlei	
2011	Liuzhou	(China) Lin Dan	(China) Wang Yihan	(Denmark) Mathias Boe (Denmark) Carsten Mogensen	(China) Wang Xiaoli (China) Yu Yang	(China) Zhang Nan (China) Zhao Yunlei	
2012	Shenzhen	(China) Chen Long	(China) Li Xuerui	(Denmark) Mathias Boe (Denmark) Carsten Mogensen	(China) Wang Xiaoli (China) Yu Yang	(Denmark) Joachim Fischer Nielsen (Denmark) Christinna Pedersen	
2013	Kuala Lumpur	(Malaysia) Lee Chong Wei	(China) Li Xuerui	(Indonesia) Mohammad Ahsan (Indonesia) Hendra Setiawan	(Denmark) Christinna Pedersen (Denmark) Kamilla Rytter Juhl	(Denmark) Joachim Fischer Nielsen (Denmark) Christinna Pedersen	
2014	Dubai	(China) Chen Long	(Chinese Taipei) Tai Tzu-ying	(South Korea) Lee Yong-dae (South Korea) Yoo Yeon-seong	(Japan) Misaki Matsutomo (Japan) Ayaka Takahashi	(China) Zhang Nan (China) Zhao Yunlei	
2015	Dubai	(Japan) Kento Momota	(Japan) Nozomi Okuhara	(Indonesia) Mohammad Ahsan (Indonesia) Hendra Setiawan	(China) Luo Ying (China) Luo Yu	(England) Chris Adcock (England) Gabby Adcock	
2016	Dubai	(Denmark) Viktor Axelsen	(Chinese Taipei) Tai Tzu-ying	(Malaysia) Goh V Shem (Malaysia) Tan Wee Kiong	(China) Chen Qingchen (China) Jia Yifan	(China) Zheng Siwei (China) Chen Qingchen	
2017	Dubai	(Denmark) Viktor Axelsen	(Japan) Akane Yamaguchi	(Indonesia) Marcus Fernaldi Gideon (Indonesia) Kevin Sanjaya Sukamuljo	(Japan) Shiho Tanaka (Japan) Koharu Yonemoto	(China) Zheng Siwei (China) Chen Qingchen	

== Performances by nation ==
Top Nations
Rank	Nation	MS	WS	MD	WD	XD	Total
1	China	3	4	0	5	5	17
2	Denmark	2	0	3	1	4	10
3	Malaysia	4	1	2	2	0	9
4	Japan	1	2	0	2	0	5
5	Indonesia	0	0	3	0	0	3
6	South Korea	0	0	2	0	0	2
6	Chinese Taipei	0	2	0	0	0	2
7	Hong Kong	0	1	0	0	0	1
7	England	0	0	0	0	1	1
	Total	10	10	10	10	10	50

== Records and statistics ==
=== Most titles ===
Only players who have won at least two BWF Super Series Finals titles are listed. In doubles events, titles are counted individually for each player.

==== Overall ====
Rank	Player	Event	Titles	Years
1	(Denmark) Christinna Pedersen	Women's doubles / Mixed doubles	4	2009, 2012, 2013 (2)
1	(Malaysia) Lee Chong Wei	Men's singles	4	2008, 2009, 2010, 2013
3	(China) Chen Qingchen	Women's doubles / Mixed doubles	3	2016 (2), 2017
3	(China) Wang Xiaoli	Women's doubles	3	2010, 2011, 2012
3	(China) Yu Yang	Women's doubles	3	2010, 2011, 2012
3	(China) Zhang Nan	Mixed doubles	3	2010, 2011, 2014
3	(China) Zhao Yunlei	Mixed doubles	3	2010, 2011, 2014
3	(Denmark) Carsten Mogensen	Men's doubles	3	2010, 2011, 2012
3	(Denmark) Joachim Fischer Nielsen	Mixed doubles	3	2009, 2012, 2013
3	(Denmark) Mathias Boe	Men's doubles	3	2010, 2011, 2012
11	(China) Chen Long	Men's singles	2	2012, 2014
11	(China) Li Xuerui	Women's singles	2	2012, 2013
11	(China) Zheng Siwei	Mixed doubles	2	2016, 2017
11	(Chinese Taipei) Tai Tzu-ying	Women's singles	2	2014, 2016
11	(Denmark) Kamilla Rytter Juhl	Women's doubles / Mixed doubles	2	2008, 2013
11	(Denmark) Viktor Axelsen	Men's singles	2	2016, 2017
11	(Indonesia) Hendra Setiawan	Men's doubles	2	2013, 2015
11	(Indonesia) Mohammad Ahsan	Men's doubles	2	2013, 2015
11	(South Korea) Lee Yong-dae	Men's doubles	2	2009, 2014
11	(Malaysia) Chin Eei Hui	Women's doubles	2	2008, 2009
11	(Malaysia) Wong Pei Tty	Women's doubles	2	2008, 2009

==== Men's singles ====
Rank	Player	Titles	Years
1	(Malaysia) Lee Chong Wei	4	2008, 2009, 2010, 2013
2	(China) Chen Long	2	2012, 2014
2	(Denmark) Viktor Axelsen	2	2016, 2017

==== Women's singles ====
Rank	Player	Titles	Years
1	(China) Li Xuerui	2	2012, 2013
1	(Chinese Taipei) Tai Tzu-ying	2	2014, 2016

==== Men's doubles ====
Rank	Player	Titles	Years
1	(Denmark) Carsten Mogensen	3	2010, 2011, 2012
1	(Denmark) Mathias Boe	3	2010, 2011, 2012
3	(Indonesia) Hendra Setiawan	2	2013, 2015
3	(Indonesia) Mohammad Ahsan	2	2013, 2015
3	(South Korea) Lee Yong-dae	2	2009, 2014

==== Women's doubles ====
Rank	Player	Titles	Years
1	(China) Wang Xiaoli	3	2010, 2011, 2012
1	(China) Yu Yang	3	2010, 2011, 2012
3	(Malaysia) Chin Eei Hui	2	2008, 2009
3	(Malaysia) Wong Pei Tty	2	2008, 2009

==== Mixed doubles ====
Rank	Player	Titles	Years
1	(China) Zhang Nan	3	2010, 2011, 2014
1	(China) Zhao Yunlei	3	2010, 2011, 2014
1	(Denmark) Christinna Pedersen	3	2009, 2012, 2013
1	(Denmark) Joachim Fischer Nielsen	3	2009, 2012, 2013
5	(China) Chen Qingchen	2	2016, 2017
5	(China) Zheng Siwei	2	2016, 2017

=== Consecutive titles ===
Only players or pairs who have won titles in at least two consecutive editions are listed.

Rank	Player(s)	Event	Consecutive titles	Years
1	(China) Wang Xiaoli / Yu Yang	Women's doubles	3	2010–2012
1	(Denmark) Mathias Boe / Carsten Mogensen	Men's doubles	3	2010–2012
1	(Malaysia) Lee Chong Wei	Men's singles	3	2008–2010
4	(China) Li Xuerui	Women's singles	2	2012–2013
4	(China) Zhang Nan / Zhao Yunlei	Mixed doubles	2	2010–2011
4	(China) Zheng Siwei / Chen Qingchen	Mixed doubles	2	2016–2017
4	(Denmark) Joachim Fischer Nielsen / Christinna Pedersen	Mixed doubles	2	2012–2013
4	(Denmark) Viktor Axelsen	Men's singles	2	2016–2017
4	(Malaysia) Chin Eei Hui / Wong Pei Tty	Women's doubles	2	2008–2009

=== Youngest champions ===
The five youngest players to win a BWF Super Series Finals title are listed. Ages are calculated as of the date of the final. In doubles events, players are counted individually.

Rank	Player	Event	Age	Edition
1	(China) Jia Yifan	Women's doubles	19 years, 172 days	2016
2	(China) Chen Qingchen	Women's doubles / Mixed doubles	19 years, 178 days	2016
3	(China) Zheng Siwei	Mixed doubles	19 years, 296 days	2016
4	(Japan) Akane Yamaguchi	Women's singles	20 years, 194 days	2017
5	(Japan) Nozomi Okuhara	Women's singles	20 years, 275 days	2015

=== Oldest champions ===
The five oldest players to win a BWF Super Series Finals title are listed. Ages are calculated as of the date of the final. In doubles events, players are counted individually.

Rank	Player	Event	Age	Edition
1	(Denmark) Joachim Fischer Nielsen	Mixed doubles	35 years, 22 days	2013
2	(Denmark) Mathias Boe	Men's doubles	32 years, 158 days	2012
3	(Indonesia) Hendra Setiawan	Men's doubles	31 years, 110 days	2015
4	(Denmark) Thomas Laybourn	Mixed doubles	31 years, 82 days	2008
5	(Malaysia) Lee Chong Wei	Men's singles	31 years, 55 days	2013

=== Most finals ===
Only players who have appeared in at least three finals at the BWF Super Series Finals are listed. In doubles events, final appearances are counted individually for each player.

Rank	Player	Event	Finals	Titles	Runners-up	Years
1	(China) Zhao Yunlei	Women's doubles / Mixed doubles	7	3	4	2010 (2), 2011, 2012, 2013, 2014 (2)
2	(China) Zhang Nan	Men's doubles / Mixed doubles	6	3	3	2010, 2011, 2012, 2013, 2014, 2017
2	(Denmark) Christinna Pedersen	Women's doubles / Mixed doubles	6	4	2	2009, 2012 (2), 2013 (2), 2015
4	(Denmark) Kamilla Rytter Juhl	Women's doubles / Mixed doubles	5	2	3	2008, 2009, 2012, 2013, 2015
4	(Malaysia) Lee Chong Wei	Men's singles	5	4	1	2008, 2009, 2010, 2013, 2017
6	(Denmark) Carsten Mogensen	Men's doubles	4	3	1	2009, 2010, 2011, 2012
6	(Denmark) Mathias Boe	Men's doubles	4	3	1	2009, 2010, 2011, 2012
6	(South Korea) Lee Yong-dae	Men's doubles	4	2	2	2008, 2009, 2010, 2014
9	(China) Chen Long	Men's singles	3	2	1	2011, 2012, 2014
9	(China) Chen Qingchen	Women's doubles / Mixed doubles	3	3	0	2016 (2), 2017
9	(China) Wang Xiaoli	Women's doubles	3	3	0	2010, 2011, 2012
9	(China) Yu Yang	Women's doubles	3	3	0	2010, 2011, 2012
9	(Chinese Taipei) Tai Tzu-ying	Women's singles	3	2	1	2013, 2014, 2016
9	(Denmark) Joachim Fischer Nielsen	Mixed doubles	3	3	0	2009, 2012, 2013
9	(Denmark) Viktor Axelsen	Men's singles	3	2	1	2015, 2016, 2017
9	(South Korea) Jung Jae-sung	Men's doubles	3	1	2	2008, 2009, 2010

== See also ==
- World Badminton Grand Prix Finals
- BWF World Tour Finals
