= 2014 BWF Super Series Finals =

Tournament details
- Dates: 17–21 December 2014
- Level: International
- Total prize money: US$1,000,000
- Venue: Hamdan Sports Complex
- Location: Dubai, United Arab Emirates

Champions
- Men's singles: (China) Chen Long
- Women's singles: (Chinese Taipei) Tai Tzu-ying
- Men's doubles: (South Korea) Lee Yong-dae (South Korea) Yoo Yeon-seong
- Women's doubles: (Japan) Misaki Matsutomo (Japan) Ayaka Takahashi
- Mixed doubles: (China) Zhang Nan (China) Zhao Yunlei

The 2014 BWF Super Series Finals was the final competition of the 2014 BWF Super Series. It was held from December 17 to December 21 in Dubai, United Arab Emirates.

== Representatives by nation ==
Top Nations
Rank	Nation	MS	WS	MD	WD	XD	Total	Players
1	China	1	2	2	2	2	9	14^{§}
2	South Korea	1	2	2	2	1	8	11^{§}
3	Japan	2	1	1	2	0	6	9
4	Denmark	2	0	1	1	1	5	7^{§}
5	Indonesia	1	0	1	1	1	4	7
6	Chinese Taipei	0	1	1	0	0	2	3
6	Thailand	0	1	0	0	1	2	3
8	India	1	1	0	0	0	2	2
9	England	0	0	0	0	1	1	2
9	Germany	0	0	0	0	1	1	2
Total		8	8	8	8	8	40	60

§: Ko Sung Hyun from Korea was the only players who played in two categories (men's doubles and mixed doubles), while Zhao Yunlei from China, Christinna Pedersen from Denmark and Kim Ha-na from Korea were the players who played in two categories (women's doubles and mixed doubles).

== Performance by nation ==
Nation	Group Phase	Semifinal	Final	Winner
China	9	6	5	2
South Korea	8	3	2	1
Denmark	6	4	1	
Japan	5	3	1	1
Indonesia	4			
Thailand	2			
Chinese Taipei	2	1	1	1
India	2	2		
England	1	1		
Germany	1			

== Men's singles ==
=== Seeds ===
1. (China) Chen Long
2. (Denmark) Jan Ø. Jørgensen
3. (South Korea) Son Wan-ho
4. (India) Srikanth Kidambi
5. (Japan) Kento Momota
6. (Denmark) Hans-Kristian Vittinghus
7. (Indonesia) Tommy Sugiarto
8. (Japan) Kenichi Tago

=== Group A ===
Athlete	Pts	Pld	W	L	SF	SA	PF	PA
(China) Chen Long	2	2	2	0	4	1	97	65
(Denmark) Hans-Kristian Vittinghus	1	2	1	1	3	2	82	90
(Japan) Kenichi Tago	0	2	0	2	0	4	60	84
(South Korea) Son Wan-ho	N/A	N/A	N/A	N/A	N/A	N/A	N/A	N/A

Date		Score		Set 1	Set 2	Set 3
17 Dec	(South Korea) Son Wan-ho	0–2	(Denmark) Hans-Kristian Vittinghus	13–21	16–21	
17 Dec	(China) Chen Long	2–0	(Japan) Kenichi Tago	21–11	21–14	
18 Dec	(South Korea) Son Wan-ho	retired	(Japan) Kenichi Tago	9–21	3^{r}-11	
18 Dec	(China) Chen Long	2–1	(Denmark) Hans-Kristian Vittinghus	13–21	21–10	21–9
19 Dec	(Denmark) Hans-Kristian Vittinghus	2–0	(Japan) Kenichi Tago	21–19	21–16	
19 Dec	(China) Chen Long	w/o	(South Korea) Son Wan-ho			

=== Group B ===
Athlete	Pts	Pld	W	L	SF	SA	PF	PA
(Denmark) Jan Ø. Jørgensen	2	3	2	1	5	3	153	133
(India) Srikanth Kidambi	2	3	2	1	5	3	146	137
(Japan) Kento Momota	2	3	2	1	5	4	160	166
(Indonesia) Tommy Sugiarto	0	3	0	3	1	6	113	135

Date		Score		Set 1	Set 2	Set 3
17 Dec	(Denmark) Jan Ø. Jørgensen	2–0	(Indonesia) Tommy Sugiarto	21–15	21–9	
17 Dec	(India) Srikanth Kidambi	2–1	(Japan) Kento Momota	15–21	21–16	21–10
18 Dec	(Denmark) Jan Ø. Jørgensen	1–2	(Japan) Kento Momota	22–20	18–21	12–21
18 Dec	(India) Srikanth Kidambi	2–0	(Indonesia) Tommy Sugiarto	21–18	21–13	
19 Dec	(Japan) Kento Momota	2–1	(Indonesia) Tommy Sugiarto	23–21	7–21	21–15
19 Dec	(Denmark) Jan Ø. Jørgensen	2–1	(India) Srikanth Kidambi	17–21	21–12	21–14

=== Finals ===
Semifinals
1	(China) Chen Long	21	21
4	(India) Srikanth Kidambi	18	9
6	(Denmark) Hans-Kristian Vittinghus	21	21
2	(Denmark) Jan Ø. Jørgensen	11	17

Final
1	(China) Chen Long	21	21
6	(Denmark) Hans-Kristian Vittinghus	16	10

== Women's singles ==
=== Seeds ===
1. (China) Wang Shixian
2. (China) Wang Yihan
3. (India) Saina Nehwal
4. (Thailand) Ratchanok Intanon
5. (South Korea) Sung Ji-hyun
6. (Chinese Taipei) Tai Tzu-ying
7. (South Korea) Bae Yeon-ju
8. (Japan) Akane Yamaguchi

=== Withdrawn ===
1. (China) Li Xuerui

=== Group A ===
Athlete	Pts	Pld	W	L	SF	SA	PF	PA
(India) Saina Nehwal	3	3	3	0	6	1	141	110
(South Korea) Sung Ji-hyun	2	3	2	1	4	2	114	86
(South Korea) Bae Yeon-ju	1	3	1	2	3	4	113	133
(China) Wang Shixian	0	3	0	3	0	6	87	126

Date		Score		Set 1	Set 2	Set 3
17 Dec	(South Korea) Sung Ji-hyun	2–0	(South Korea) Bae Yeon-ju	21–15	21–11	
17 Dec	(China) Wang Shixian	0–2	(India) Saina Nehwal	17–21	18–21	
18 Dec	(China) Wang Shixian	0–2	(South Korea) Bae Yeon-ju	17–21	17–21	
18 Dec	(India) Saina Nehwal	2–0	(South Korea) Sung Ji-hyun	21–12	21–18	
19 Dec	(China) Wang Shixian	0–2	(South Korea) Sung Ji-hyun	7–21	11–21	
19 Dec	(India) Saina Nehwal	2–1	(South Korea) Bae Yeon-ju	15–21	21–7	21–17

=== Group B ===
Athlete	Pts	Pld	W	L	SF	SA	PF	PA
(Japan) Akane Yamaguchi	2	2	2	0	4	2	119	100
(Chinese Taipei) Tai Tzu-ying	1	2	1	1	3	3	112	105
(Thailand) Ratchanok Intanon	0	2	0	2	2	4	92	118
(China) Wang Yihan	N/A	N/A	N/A	N/A	N/A	N/A	N/A	N/A

Date		Score		Set 1	Set 2	Set 3
17 Dec	(Thailand) Ratchanok Intanon	1–2	(Chinese Taipei) Tai Tzu-ying	13–21	21–18	10–21
17 Dec	(China) Wang Yihan	1–2	(Japan) Akane Yamaguchi	16–21	21–17	15–21
18 Dec	(China) Wang Yihan	retired	(Chinese Taipei) Tai Tzu-ying	12–21	8^{r}-11	
18 Dec	(Thailand) Ratchanok Intanon	1–2	(Japan) Akane Yamaguchi	15–21	21–16	12–21
19 Dec	(Chinese Taipei) Tai Tzu-ying	1–2	(Japan) Akane Yamaguchi	21–19	14–21	17–21
19 Dec	(Thailand) Ratchanok Intanon	w/o	(China) Wang Yihan			

=== Finals ===
Semifinals
3	(India) Saina Nehwal	21	13	9
6	(Chinese Taipei) Tai Tzu-ying	11	21	21
5	(South Korea) Sung Ji-hyun	21	21
8	(Japan) Akane Yamaguchi	13	13

Final
6	(Chinese Taipei) Tai Tzu-ying	21	21
5	(South Korea) Sung Ji-hyun	17	12

== Men's doubles ==
=== Seeds ===
1. (South Korea) Lee Yong Dae / Yoo Yeon-seong
2. (Chinese Taipei) Lee Sheng-mu / Tsai Chia-hsin
3. (Japan) Hiroyuki Endo / Kenichi Hayakawa
4. (Indonesia) Mohammad Ahsan / Hendra Setiawan
5. (China) Liu Xiaolong / Qiu Zihan
6. (China) Chai Biao / Hong Wei
7. (Denmark) Mathias Boe / Carsten Mogensen
8. (South Korea) Ko Sung Hyun / Shin Baek-cheol

=== Group A ===
Athlete	Pts	Pld	W	L	SF	SA	PF	PA
(China) Chai Biao (China) Hong Wei	2	2	2	0	4	1	99	87
(South Korea) Lee Yong Dae (South Korea) Yoo Yeon-seong	1	2	1	1	2	2	76	67
(South Korea) Ko Sung Hyun (South Korea) Shin Baek-cheol	0	2	0	2	1	4	78	99
(Indonesia) Mohammad Ahsan (Indonesia) Hendra Setiawan	N/A	N/A	N/A	N/A	N/A	N/A	N/A	N/A

Date		Score		Set 1	Set 2	Set 3
17 Dec	(South Korea) Lee Yong Dae (South Korea) Yoo Yeon-seong	2–0	(South Korea) Ko Sung Hyun (South Korea) Shin Baek-cheol	21–14	21–11	
17 Dec	(Indonesia) Mohammad Ahsan (Indonesia) Hendra Setiawan	retired	(China) Chai Biao (China) Hong Wei	7^{r}-11		
18 Dec	(Indonesia) Mohammad Ahsan (Indonesia) Hendra Setiawan	w/o	(South Korea) Ko Sung Hyun (South Korea) Shin Baek-cheol			
18 Dec	(South Korea) Lee Yong Dae (South Korea) Yoo Yeon-seong	0–2	(China) Chai Biao (China) Hong Wei	16–21	18–21	
19 Dec	(China) Chai Biao (China) Hong Wei	2–1	(South Korea) Ko Sung Hyun (South Korea) Shin Baek-cheol	15–21	21–15	21–17
19 Dec	(South Korea) Lee Yong Dae (South Korea) Yoo Yeon-seong	w/o	(Indonesia) Mohammad Ahsan (Indonesia) Hendra Setiawan			

=== Group B ===
Athlete	Pts	Pld	W	L	SF	SA	PF	PA
(Denmark) Mathias Boe (Denmark) Carsten Mogensen	2	3	2	1	4	3	132	130
(Japan) Hiroyuki Endo (Japan) Kenichi Hayakawa	2	3	2	1	5	2	140	99
(Chinese Taipei) Lee Sheng-mu (Chinese Taipei) Tsai Chia-hsin	1	3	1	2	2	4	96	112
(China) Liu Xiaolong (China) Qiu Zihan	1	3	1	2	2	4	89	116

Date		Score		Set 1	Set 2	Set 3
17 Dec	(Japan) Hiroyuki Endo (Japan) Kenichi Hayakawa	2–0	(China) Liu Xiaolong (China) Qiu Zihan	21–7	21–12	
17 Dec	(Chinese Taipei) Lee Sheng-mu (Chinese Taipei) Tsai Chia-hsin	0–2	(Denmark) Mathias Boe (Denmark) Carsten Mogensen	16–21	16–21	
18 Dec	(Japan) Hiroyuki Endo (Japan) Kenichi Hayakawa	1–2	(Denmark) Mathias Boe (Denmark) Carsten Mogensen	21–16	19–21	16–21
18 Dec	(Chinese Taipei) Lee Sheng-mu (Chinese Taipei) Tsai Chia-hsin	2–0	(China) Liu Xiaolong (China) Qiu Zihan	21–11	21–17	
19 Dec	(Chinese Taipei) Lee Sheng-mu (Chinese Taipei) Tsai Chia-hsin	0–2	(Japan) Hiroyuki Endo (Japan) Kenichi Hayakawa	8–21	14–21	
19 Dec	(China) Liu Xiaolong (China) Qiu Zihan	2–0	(Denmark) Mathias Boe (Denmark) Carsten Mogensen	21–17	21–15	

=== Finals ===
Semifinals
6	(China) Chai Biao (China) Hong Wei	18	21	21
3	(Japan) Hiroyuki Endo (Japan) Kenichi Hayakawa	21	15	12
1	(South Korea) Lee Yong-dae (South Korea) Yoo Yeon-seong	21	21
7	(Denmark) Mathias Boe (Denmark) Carsten Mogensen	15	16

Final
6	(China) Chai Biao (China) Hong Wei	21	19	16
1	(South Korea) Lee Yong-dae (South Korea) Yoo Yeon-seong	19	21	21

== Women's doubles ==
=== Seeds ===
1. (Japan) Misaki Matsutomo / Ayaka Takahashi
2. (Japan) Reika Kakiiwa / Miyuki Maeda
3. (China) Tian Qing / Zhao Yunlei
4. (Denmark) Christinna Pedersen / Kamilla Rytter Juhl
5. (China) Luo Ying / Luo Yu
6. (South Korea) Jang Ye-na / Kim So-young
7. (South Korea) Jung Kyung-eun / Kim Ha-na
8. (Indonesia) Nitya Krishinda Maheswari / Greysia Polii

=== Group A ===
Athlete	Pts	Pld	W	L	SF	SA	PF	PA
(Japan) Misaki Matsutomo (Japan) Ayaka Takahashi	2	3	2	1	4	4	151	138
(South Korea) Jung Kyung-eun (South Korea) Kim Ha-na	2	3	2	1	5	3	141	126
(Denmark) Christinna Pedersen (Denmark) Kamilla Rytter Juhl	1	3	1	2	3	4	111	125
(South Korea) Jang Ye-na (South Korea) Kim So-young	1	3	1	2	3	4	119	133

Date		Score		Set 1	Set 2	Set 3
17 Dec	(South Korea) Jang Ye-na (South Korea) Kim So-young	1–2	(South Korea) Jung Kyung-eun (South Korea) Kim Ha-na	12–21	21–9	15–21
17 Dec	(Japan) Misaki Matsutomo (Japan) Ayaka Takahashi	2–1	(Denmark) Christinna Pedersen (Denmark) Kamilla Rytter Juhl	14–21	21–16	21–9
18 Dec	(Japan) Misaki Matsutomo (Japan) Ayaka Takahashi	2–1	(South Korea) Jung Kyung-eun (South Korea) Kim Ha-na	21–15	13–21	21–12
18 Dec	(Denmark) Christinna Pedersen (Denmark) Kamilla Rytter Juhl	2–0	(South Korea) Jang Ye-na (South Korea) Kim So-young	21–15	21–12	
19 Dec	(Denmark) Christinna Pedersen (Denmark) Kamilla Rytter Juhl	0–2	(South Korea) Jung Kyung-eun (South Korea) Kim Ha-na	5–21	18–21	
19 Dec	(Japan) Misaki Matsutomo (Japan) Ayaka Takahashi	0–2	(South Korea) Jang Ye-na (South Korea) Kim So-young	19–21	21–23	

=== Group B ===
Athlete	Pts	Pld	W	L	SF	SA	PF	PA
(China) Tian Qing (China) Zhao Yunlei	2	2	2	0	4	1	102	74
(China) Luo Ying (China) Luo Yu	1	2	1	1	3	2	91	87
(Japan) Reika Kakiiwa (Japan) Miyuki Maeda	0	2	0	2	0	4	52	84
(Indonesia) Nitya Krishinda Maheswari (Indonesia) Greysia Polii	N/A	N/A	N/A	N/A	N/A	N/A	N/A	N/A

Date		Score		Set 1	Set 2	Set 3
17 Dec	(China) Tian Qing (China) Zhao Yunlei	2–1	(China) Luo Ying (China) Luo Yu	21–17	18–21	21–11
17 Dec	(Japan) Reika Kakiiwa (Japan) Miyuki Maeda	retired	(Indonesia) Nitya Krishinda Maheswari (Indonesia) Greysia Polii	18–21	22–20	6–8^{r}
18 Dec	(Japan) Reika Kakiiwa (Japan) Miyuki Maeda	0–2	(China) Luo Ying (China) Luo Yu	13–21	14–21	
18 Dec	(China) Tian Qing (China) Zhao Yunlei	w/o	(Indonesia) Nitya Krishinda Maheswari (Indonesia) Greysia Polii			
19 Dec	(Japan) Reika Kakiiwa (Japan) Miyuki Maeda	0–2	(China) Tian Qing (China) Zhao Yunlei	14–21	11–21	
19 Dec	(China) Luo Ying (China) Luo Yu	w/o	(Indonesia) Nitya Krishinda Maheswari (Indonesia) Greysia Polii			

=== Finals ===
Semifinals
1	(Japan) Misaki Matsutomo (Japan) Ayaka Takahashi	21	13	21
5	(China) Luo Ying (China) Luo Yu	14	21	14
7	(South Korea) Jung Kyung-eun (South Korea) Kim Ha-na	9	9
3	(China) Tian Qing (China) Zhao Yunlei	21	21

Final
1	(Japan) Misaki Matsutomo (Japan) Ayaka Takahashi	21	21
3	(China) Tian Qing (China) Zhao Yunlei	17	14

== Mixed doubles ==
=== Seeds ===
1. (China) Zhang Nan / Zhao Yunlei
2. (Indonesia) Tontowi Ahmad / Liliyana Natsir
3. (South Korea) Ko Sung-hyun / Kim Ha-na
4. (Thailand) Sudket Prapakamol / Saralee Thungthongkam
5. (England) Chris Adcock / Gabby Adcock
6. (Denmark) Joachim Fischer Nielsen / Christinna Pedersen
7. (China) Liu Cheng / Bao Yixin
8. (Germany) Michael Fuchs / Birgit Michels

=== Withdrawn ===
1. (China) Xu Chen / Ma Jin

=== Group A ===
Athlete	Pts	Pld	W	L	SF	SA	PF	PA
(China) Zhang Nan (China) Zhao Yunlei	3	3	3	0	6	0	126	89
(England) Chris Adcock (England) Gabby Adcock	1	3	1	2	3	4	132	132
(South Korea) Ko Sung Hyun (South Korea) Kim Ha-na	1	3	1	2	3	5	146	159
(Germany) Michael Fuchs (Germany) Birgit Michels	1	3	1	2	2	5	119	143

Date		Score		Set 1	Set 2	Set 3
17 Dec	(South Korea) Ko Sung Hyun (South Korea) Kim Ha-na	2–1	(England) Chris Adcock (England) Gabby Adcock	14–21	21–18	22–20
17 Dec	(China) Zhang Nan (China) Zhao Yunlei	2–0	(Germany) Michael Fuchs (Germany) Birgit Michels	21–18	21–10	
18 Dec	(China) Zhang Nan (China) Zhao Yunlei	2–0	(England) Chris Adcock (England) Gabby Adcock	21–14	21–17	
18 Dec	(South Korea) Ko Sung Hyun (South Korea) Kim Ha-na	1–2	(Germany) Michael Fuchs (Germany) Birgit Michels	21–16	19–21	19–21
19 Dec	(England) Chris Adcock (England) Gabby Adcock	2–0	(Germany) Michael Fuchs (Germany) Birgit Michels	21–16	21–17	
19 Dec	(China) Zhang Nan (China) Zhao Yunlei	2–0	(South Korea) Ko Sung Hyun (South Korea) Kim Ha-na	21–12	21–18	

=== Group B ===
Athlete	Pts	Pld	W	L	SF	SA	PF	PA
(China) Liu Cheng (China) Bao Yixin	3	3	3	0	6	2	152	120
(Denmark) Joachim Fischer Nielsen (Denmark) Christinna Pedersen	2	3	2	1	5	2	142	118
(Indonesia) Tontowi Ahmad (Indonesia) Liliyana Natsir	1	3	1	2	3	4	123	132
(Thailand) Sudket Prapakamol (Thailand) Saralee Thungthongkam	0	3	0	3	0	6	83	129

Date		Score		Set 1	Set 2	Set 3
17 Dec	(Thailand) Sudket Prapakamol (Thailand) Saralee Thungthongkam	0–2	(Denmark) Joachim Fischer Nielsen (Denmark) Christinna Pedersen	5–21	22–24	
17 Dec	(Indonesia) Tontowi Ahmad (Indonesia) Liliyana Natsir	1–2	(China) Liu Cheng (China) Bao Yixin	10–21	21–12	15–21
18 Dec	(Indonesia) Tontowi Ahmad (Indonesia) Liliyana Natsir	0–2	(Denmark) Joachim Fischer Nielsen (Denmark) Christinna Pedersen	15–21	20–22	
18 Dec	(Thailand) Sudket Prapakamol (Thailand) Saralee Thungthongkam	0–2	(China) Liu Cheng (China) Bao Yixin	7–21	14–21	
19 Dec	(Indonesia) Tontowi Ahmad (Indonesia) Liliyana Natsir	2–0	(Thailand) Sudket Prapakamol (Thailand) Saralee Thungthongkam	21–16	21–19	
19 Dec	(Denmark) Joachim Fischer Nielsen (Denmark) Christinna Pedersen	1–2	(China) Liu Cheng (China) Bao Yixin	21–14	16–21	16–21

=== Finals ===
Semifinals
1	(China) Zhang Nan (China) Zhao Yunlei	21	21
5	(England) Chris Adcock (England) Gabby Adcock	9	12
6	(Denmark) Joachim Fischer Nielsen (Denmark) Christinna Pedersen	13	12
7	(China) Liu Cheng (China) Bao Yixin	21	21

Final
1	(China) Zhang Nan (China) Zhao Yunlei	21	21
7	(China) Liu Cheng (China) Bao Yixin	15	12
