= Wei Nan =

Hong Kong badminton player

Wei Nan 魏楠
Personal information
- Born: 4 January 1984 (age 42)

Sport
- Country: Hong Kong
- Sport: Badminton

Men's singles
- Highest ranking: 17 (9 October 2014)
Medal record
Men's badminton
Representing Hong Kong
Asian Games
Bronze medal – third place	2014 Incheon	Men's singles

Wei Nan (Chinese: 魏楠) (born 4 January 1984) is a badminton player from Hong Kong. He was a member of Hong Kong team in 2014 Thomas & Uber Cup. He became the first men's singles medalist for Hong Kong by winning a bronze medal in 2014 Asian Games.

== Achievements ==
=== Asian Games ===
Men's singles
Year	Venue	Opponent	Score	Result
2014	Gyeyang Gymnasium; Incheon, South Korea	(China) Chen Long	6–21, 10–21	Bronze

=== BWF Grand Prix ===
The BWF Grand Prix had two levels, the Grand Prix and Grand Prix Gold. It was a series of badminton tournaments sanctioned by the Badminton World Federation (BWF) and played between 2007 and 2017.

Men's singles
Year	Venue	Opponent	Score	Result
2010	Vietnam Open	(China) Chen Yuekun	14–21, 13–21	(silver) Runner-up
2013	Dutch Open	(Hong Kong) Chan Yan Kit	21–15, 21–18	(gold) Winner

BWF Grand Prix tournament

=== BWF International Challenge/Series ===
Men's singles
Year	Venue	Opponent	Score	Result
2014	China International	(Hong Kong) Ng Ka Long	16–21, 15–21	(silver) Runner-up

BWF International Challenge tournament
