= Chen Long =

Chinese badminton player (born 1989)

Chen Long 谌龙
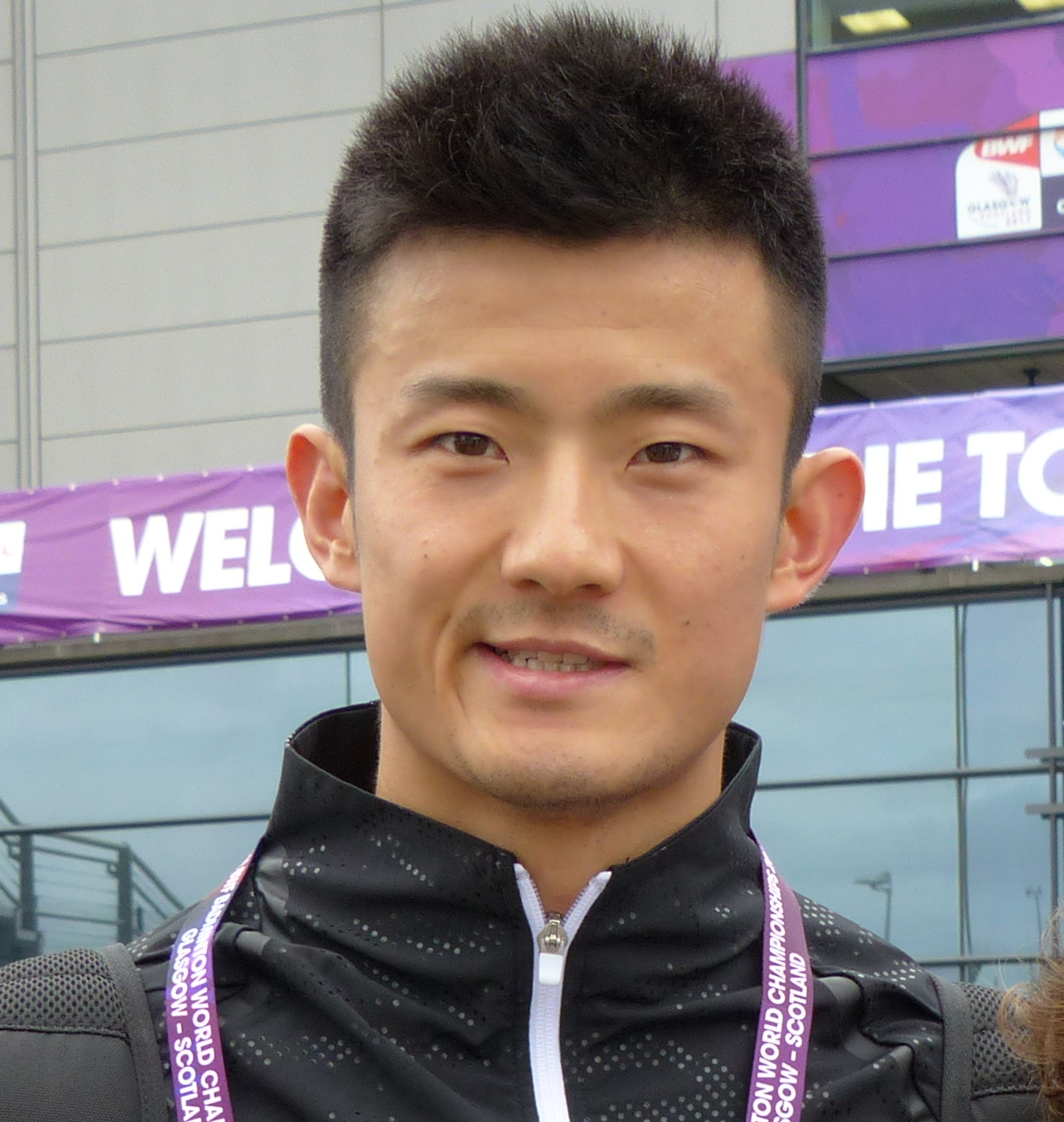
- Chen at the 2017 World Championships

Personal information
- Nickname: The Great Wall of China
- Born: 18 January 1989 (age 37) Shashi, Jingzhou, China
- Years active: 2007–2021
- Height: 1.87 m (6 ft 2 in)
- Weight: 75 kg (165 lb)
- Spouse: Wang Shixian (m. 2017)

Sport
- Country: China
- Sport: Badminton
- Handedness: Right

Men's singles
- Career record: 446 wins, 115 losses
- Highest ranking: 1 (25 December 2014)
- BWF profile
Medal record
Men's badminton
Representing China
Olympic Games
Gold medal – first place	2016 Rio de Janeiro	Men's singles
Silver medal – second place	2020 Tokyo	Men's singles
Bronze medal – third place	2012 London	Men's singles
World Championships
Gold medal – first place	2014 Copenhagen	Men's singles
Gold medal – first place	2015 Jakarta	Men's singles
Bronze medal – third place	2017 Glasgow	Men's singles
Bronze medal – third place	2018 Nanjing	Men's singles
Sudirman Cup
Gold medal – first place	2011 Qingdao	Mixed team
Gold medal – first place	2013 Kuala Lumpur	Mixed team
Gold medal – first place	2015 Dongguan	Mixed team
Gold medal – first place	2019 Nanning	Mixed team
Silver medal – second place	2017 Gold Coast	Mixed team
Thomas Cup
Gold medal – first place	2010 Kuala Lumpur	Men's team
Gold medal – first place	2012 Wuhan	Men's team
Gold medal – first place	2018 Bangkok	Men's team
Bronze medal – third place	2014 New Delhi	Men's team
Asian Games
Gold medal – first place	2010 Guangzhou	Men's team
Gold medal – first place	2018 Jakarta–Palembang	Men's team
Silver medal – second place	2014 Incheon	Men's singles
Silver medal – second place	2014 Incheon	Men's team
Asian Championships
Gold medal – first place	2017 Wuhan	Men's singles
Silver medal – second place	2009 Suwon	Men's singles
Silver medal – second place	2013 Taipei	Men's singles
Silver medal – second place	2016 Wuhan	Men's singles
Silver medal – second place	2018 Wuhan	Men's singles
Bronze medal – third place	2011 Chengdu	Men's singles
Bronze medal – third place	2012 Qingdao	Men's singles
Bronze medal – third place	2015 Wuhan	Men's singles
East Asian Games
Gold medal – first place	2009 Hong Kong	Men's team
Gold medal – first place	2013 Tianjin	Men's team
World Junior Championships
Gold medal – first place	2007 Waitakere City	Boys' singles
Gold medal – first place	2007 Waitakere City	Mixed team
Asian Junior Championships
Gold medal – first place	2007 Kuala Lumpur	Boys' singles
Silver medal – second place	2007 Kuala Lumpur	Mixed team

Chen Long (Chinese: 谌龙; pinyin: Chén Lóng; Mandarin pronunciation: [ʈʂʰə̂n lʊ̌ŋ]; born 18 January 1989), is a Chinese professional badminton coach and former player. He is the 2016 Olympic champion, two-time World champion, and an Asian champion.

Chen was a former World number 1, occupying the top men's singles ranking for 76 consecutive weeks from December 2014 to June 2016. He started his achievements in the international stage by winning the boys' singles title in the Asian and World Junior Championships in 2007, and then won his first professional tournament in the Philippines Open in 2009.

Nicknamed "The Great Wall of China" by fans, he is known for his endurance, ability to dictate the tempo of rallies, and defensive style of play. He is widely regarded as one of the leading figures in men's singles badminton.

== Early life ==
Born in Shashi City, Hubei Province, Chen had shown his talent as a badminton player when he was young, and entered the Sports School in Jingzhou at the age of seven in 1996. In 2000, he joined the Xiamen team, and was selected to join the national youth team in 2005. In 2006, Chen entered the national second team.

== Career ==
=== 2007–2008: Asian and World Junior Champions ===
Chen emerged as an Asian Junior Champion in 2007, and at the same year, he won the World Junior Championships. He also helped the Chinese team won the 2007 Suhandinata Cup.

In 2008, Chen was selected to join the national first team.

=== 2009–2010: Three tour titles, Thomas Cup and Asian Games Team Champions, World #4 ===
Chen won his first professional title at the Grand Prix Gold event in the 2009 Philippines Open, beating Hu Yun of Hong Kong in the final.

Chen participated in the Korea Open Super Series in January. He made it through to the semi-finals before losing to Danish player Peter Gade in three games, 13–21, 21–10, 17–21. A week later, in the Malaysia Open, he lost in the opening round to Boonsak Ponsana of Thailand.

In March, at the German Open, Chen lost in the final to his teammate, Bao Chunlai in two straight games. At the All England Open, he registered an impressive victory over 8th seed Jan Ø. Jørgensen in the first round but fell to Korea's Son Wan-ho 18–21, 21–18, 19–21 in the second round. He followed up this disappointment with his best-ever performance in a Super Series event by making it through to the final of the Swiss Open, where he finished runner-up to compatriot Chen Jin.

Chen was part of the Chinese team that won gold at the 2010 Thomas Cup in Kuala Lumpur. He only featured in their opening match against Peru, taking just 31 minutes to beat his opponent, before being replaced in the team by Bao Chunlai for the later rounds. Chen's first individual title of 2010 came at the Bitburger Open in Germany, where he beat Denmark's Hans-Kristian Vittinghus 21–3, 12–21, 21–9 in the final of the Grand Prix Gold event. His good form continued when he finished runner-up to teammate Lin Dan at the China Masters two weeks later, going down 15–21, 21–13, 14–21 to the reigning Olympic champion.

Chen obtained a second team gold medal of the year with China at the Asian Games held in Guangzhou, but did not feature in the individual event. More success followed when he won the China Open Super Series two weeks later. His passage to the final included a controversial walkover by Lin Dan in the quarter-finals and a hard-fought victory over current World champion Chen Jin in the semi-finals. In the final, he squared off against teammate Bao Chunlai, emerging as the victor after 75 minutes of play. Chen's attempt at back-to-back Super Series titles came to an end at the hands of former Olympic champion Taufik Hidayat in the semi-final of the Hong Kong Open the following week. Chen's strong finish to the year saw his world ranking rise to a career-high of 4th, briefly becoming the top ranked Chinese player.

=== 2011: Three Superseries titles ===
In the first tournament of the new season, Chen Long was convincingly beaten by world number 1 Lee Chong Wei in the semi-final of the Malaysia Open. It took just 39 minutes for the Malaysian to blow away the upcoming Chinese star with a score of 21–9, 21–9. The effects of the demoralising defeat were still evident a week later when Chen lost in the second round of the Korea Open to Japanese player Kenichi Tago. His first individual title of the year came at the Thailand Open, where he beat experienced Korean player Lee Hyun-il in the final.

In August, Chen was eliminated in the first round of the World Championships by unheralded Guatemalan player Kevin Cordón in what was one of the shock results of the tournament. Cordón emerged the victor after clinching the third set 27–25 in a thrilling encounter. Chen sprang back from his shock exit from the World Championships by winning his first China Masters title after defeating his compatriot Chen Jin in the final. A week later, he won his first Japan Open by avenging his Malaysia Open loss to world number 1 Lee Chong Wei in the final. In October, Chen won his third consecutive Super Series tournament with another victory over Lee Chong Wei, this time in the final of the Denmark Open in its first year as a Premier Super Series event.

His highlights of the season were followed by an exit from the semi-finals of Hong Kong Open to his senior, Chen Jin and failure to defend his China Open title after losing to his compatriot, Lin Dan, in the final. He ended year 2011 with another runner-up in Super Series Master Finals, being beaten by Lin Dan again.

=== 2012: Second Thomas Cup, Olympic bronze and First Superseries Finals title ===
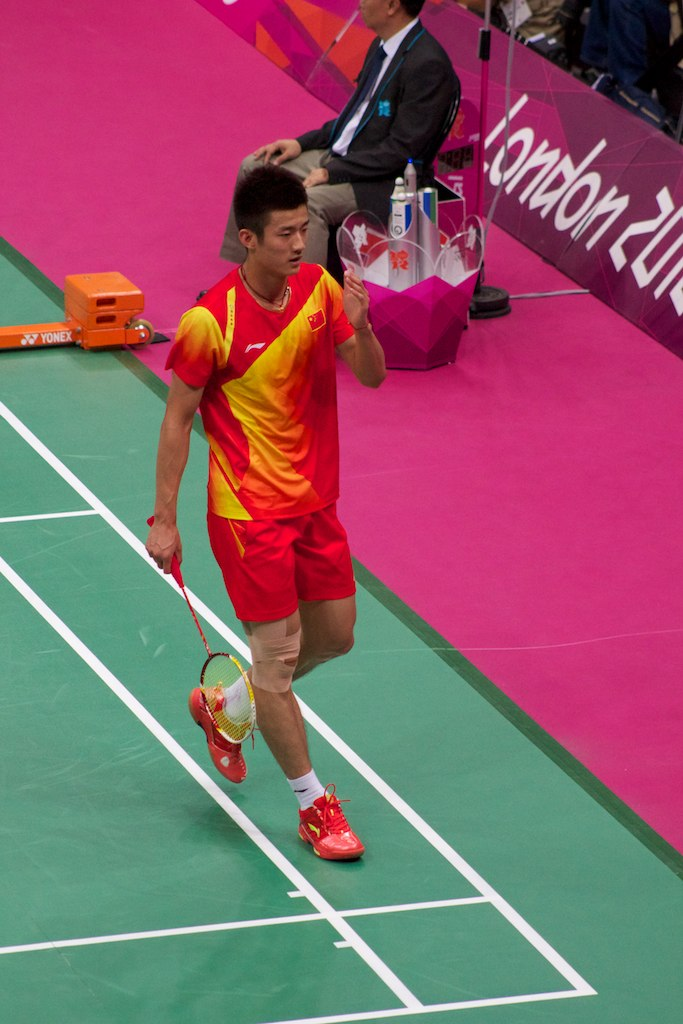
Playing in the semifinals of the 2012 Olympics

In January, Chen reached the semi-finals of the Malaysia Open, where he lost to the home favorite, Lee Chong Wei in three games, 18–21, 21–17, 13–21. In March, he participated in the All England Open and was knocked out in the quarter-finals by Kenichi Tago. He then reached the semi-finals of the Swiss Open but was eliminated by Lee Hyun-il. In April, at the Badminton Asia Championships, Chen lost in the semi-finals to his teammate, Du Pengyu. In May, at the Thomas Cup, he won all the matches that he played in, thus helping China to clinch their ninth title. In June, Chen lost in the pre-quarterfinals of Indonesia Open, to Parupalli Kashyap, 21–17, 21–14.

In the 2012 Summer Olympics, Chen was defeated in the semi-final of the men's singles competition by Lee Chong Wei of Malaysia, 21–13, 21–14, but went on to win bronze after defeating Lee Hyun-il in the bronze medal match. After the Olympics, Chen's form picked up tremendously, starting from winning the China Masters in September, where he beat Hong Kong's Hu Yun in the final. In October, he reached the semi-finals of the Denmark Open but was eliminated by his compatriot Du Pengyu once again. In November, he won both the China Open and the Hong Kong Open, beating Wang Zhengming and Lee Chong Wei respectively in the finals. At year-end, BWF Superseries Finals, Chen managed to avenge his previous defeats to Du Pengyu on tours, by beating him in the final to win his first Superseries Finals title.

=== 2013: First All England title and Sudirman Cup Champion ===
Chen carried his good form into the new season. In February, Chen won his first German Open title, defeating Tommy Sugiarto in the final. In March, Chen won convincingly against Lee Chong Wei in the 2013 All England Open in the finals, 21–17, 21–18. In April, at the Badminton Asia Championships, Chen once again lost to his teammate, Du Pengyu, albeit in the final this time. Despite missing the last two Sudirman Cup editions in 2009 and 2011, Chen Long emerged as the first singles player to help China lift its fifth consecutive trophy in 2013 edition. At the BWF World Championships held in August, Chen reached the quarter-finals but was defeated by Lin Dan. He won the Denmark Open against Lee Chong Wei, 24–22, 21–19, and then successfully defended his China Open title against compatriot Wang Zhengming in three games.

=== 2014: World Champion, Second Superseries Finals title and World #1 ===
Chen started the year with a victory against Lee Chong Wei in the Korean Open. Then, he was unable to defend his All England title as he lost to Lee Chong Wei in the finals. He subsequently lost in the Indian Open finals to the same opponent. In May, Chen played first singles for China at the 2014 Thomas Cup. They were unable to defend their title as they lost 0–3 to Japan in the semifinals. Chen took the blame for the surprise loss of the Chinese Team, casting doubt on his ability to depose Lin Dan as China's MS 'big brother'. Chen's poor start to the season continued deep into the summer, when he saw early-round knockouts in the Japan Open to Hu Yun of Hong Kong and Indonesian Open to Denmark's Jan Ø. Jørgensen.

However, his fortune reversed at the most important competition of the year. On 31 August, Chen defeated Lee Chong Wei in the finals with a score of 21–19, 21–19 to win his first-ever World Championship title at 2014 BWF World Championships held in Copenhagen, breaking his 7-month title drought. He would then continue this excellent form for the rest of the season, defeating Son Wan-ho in the final of the 2014 Denmark Super Series Premier, his 6th Super Series Premier title to date and first of the year. He would also make the finals of the 2014 Hong Kong Super Series. Chen ended the season on a high note after winning the 2014 BWF Super Series Masters Finals in Dubai, boasting a 3–0 record in the Group Stage and defeating Hans-Kristian Vittinghus 21–16, 21–10 in the final. With this victory, Chen ascended to World No.1, dethroning rival Lee Chong Wei and achieving the title of Year-End No.1 on the BWF World Ranking. This marked the first time in 6 years that a player other than Lee Chong Wei ended the year at the coveted No.1 ranking. Despite a slow start to the year, Chen's 2014 was characterised by his first-ever World Championship, solid victories at the Denmark Open and Super Series Masters Finals, and for the first time achieving the rank of World No.1.

=== 2015: Seven tour titles, Second All England, World Championships and Sudirman Cup titles ===
Starting the year as World No.1, Chen's first tournament of the season was the 2015 All England Super Series Premier, considered as the most reputable Super Series Premier title. Defeating compatriot Lin Dan in straight sets (21–13, 21–12) en route to the finals, Chen won his second All England title in 3 years with a 15–21, 21–17, 21–15 over Jan O Jorgensen. Chen continued his winning form in his next tournament, the 2015 Malaysia Super Series Premier, defeating Lin Dan, this time with a tighter scoreline of 20–22, 21–13, 21–11. Two consecutive victories over Lin Dan, long considered China's strongest badminton player in the men's singles discipline, was considered by many as Chen's resolute ascension to the position of China MS No.1. A second-round exit to Hu Yun at the 2015 Singapore Super Series and a semi-final loss at the Badminton Asia Championships to compatriot Tian Houwei by way of walkover put a stop to Chen's tournament-winning streak. In May, Chen was part of the Chinese team that won the Sudirman Cup. Victory over Viktor Axelsen at the 2015 Australian Super Series final with a score of 21–12, 14–21, 21–18 put Chen back in winning shape. This was followed by a quarter-finals exit at the 2015 Indonesia Super Series Premier, a tournament in which Chinese players routinely lose during the early stages. However, Chen would rediscover his form in the 2015 Chinese Taipei Open Grand Prix Gold with a victory over home favorite Chou Tien-chen.

He would then defend his World Championship title at the 2015 BWF World Championships held in Jakarta. Chen reached the final of the championships with ease, winning in 2 sets over each of his opponents, including Japanese rising star and then-World No.4 Kento Momota 21–9, 21–15 in the semi-finals. In a rematch of the 2014 final, Chen was again victorious over rival Lee Chong Wei, successfully defending his World Champion title with an easier scoreline of 21–14, 21–17. This marked the second World Championship title for Chen, which secured him the position of Year-End No. 1, again. Chen would follow this up with another Super Series victory at the 2015 Korea Open Super Series, during which he defeated unseeded Ajay Jayaram 21–14, 21–13 in the final.

In October, Chen continued his fine form by defeating Tommy Sugiarto in the final to win the Denmark Super Series Premier. This was Chen's 8th Super Series title, bringing his total SS (including Premier) tally to 16 and year-to-date titles to 7, the most he has achieved in one season. In November 2015, Chen reached the China Open final without losing a single set, however, a resurgent Lee Chong Wei proved tough to beat, losing the finals in two straight sets 21–15, 21–11, halting his 7 straight finals win in 2015. In December 2015, Chen made the semi-finals of the Super Series Finals in Dubai.

=== 2016: Olympic gold ===
Chen's first tournament of the season was the All England Open, whereby he only reached the Round of 16 after being defeated by his compatriot Xue Song. In April, he participated in the Malaysia Open and finished as the runner-up, losing to Lee Chong Wei in the final. At the Singapore Open held in the same month, he lost in the quarter-finals to Hong Kong's Ng Ka Long Angus. Chen then followed up with two final appearances in his next two tournaments. Unfortunately, he did not win any of those, losing in the China Masters to compatriot Lin Dan and the Badminton Asia Championships to Lee Chong Wei.

At the 2016 Olympic Games, Chen Long was the second seed behind World No.1 Lee Chong Wei of Malaysia. After defeating Niluka Karunaratne of Sri Lanka 21–7, 21–10 and Poland's Adrian Dziółko 21–12, 21–9 during the Group Stage, Chen Long was qualified for the knockout rounds. In the quarter-finals, he defeated Son Wan-ho of South Korea by a tight scoreline of 21–11, 18–21, 21–11, after which he defeated eventual bronze-medalist Denmark's Viktor Axelsen 21–14, 21–15 in the semi-finals. Facing Lee Chong Wei in the Badminton Men's Singles final at the Pavilion 4, Riocentro on 20 August 2016, Chen Long clinched the Olympic gold medal after he defeated the Malaysian (Lee Chong Wei) and won the match in straight games with a score of 21–18, 21–18, earning his first Olympic gold medal.

In November, Chen participated in the China Open and came in second to Denmark's Jan O Jorgensen.

=== 2017: First Asian Championships and Fourth China Open titles ===
In February, at the German Open, Chen reached the semi-finals but was defeated by Wang Tzu-wei in three games. In March, at the All England Open, Chen lost to Tanongsak Saensomboonsuk in the Round of 16 in straight games, 16–21, 19–21. In April, at the Badminton Asia Championships held in Wuhan, China, Chen defeated Lin Dan in the rubble set game, 21–23, 21–11, 21–10, of the men's singles final and he gets his first Asian Championships title. In May, at the 2017 Sudirman Cup, Chen won all the three games he played in, but in the final, China lost to Korea by 2–3. In June, at the Crown Group Australia Open, Chen lost to Kidambi Srikanth in the men's singles final in straight-set game, 20–22, 16–21. In August, at the Total BWF World Championships, Chen lost to Viktor Axelsen in the men's singles quarter-finals, 9–21, 10–21. He failed to defend his World Championship title of 2015. In November, at the China Open Superseries Premier in Tahoe, China, Chen defeated Viktor Axelsen in the men's singles final by the rubble set game, 21–16, 14–21, 21–13 and gets his fourth China Open title. At the Yonex–Sunrise Hong Kong Open, Chen lost to Lee Chong Wei by straight-set game, 14–21, 19–21. In the Dubai Superseries Final, Chen withdrew due to a knee injury.

=== 2018: Third Thomas Cup and Second Asian Games Team gold ===
In January, Chen was eliminated in the first round of the Malaysia Masters and in the quarter-finals of the Indonesia Masters, losing to Anthony Ginting on both occasions. In March, at the All England Open, Chen lost in the quarter-finals to the eventual champion, Shi Yuqi. At the Badminton Asia Championships, he finished as runner-up after losing the Kento Momota in the final. In May, he represented the national team in the 2018 Thomas Cup. In the group stage, he defeated Prannoy H. S. from India and Brice Leverdez from France. In the quarter-finals, he defeated Chou Tien-chen from Chinese Taipei. China beat Chinese Taipei 3–0. In the match against Indonesia in the semi-finals, he defeated Anthony Ginting in two sets. During the final match, China faced Japan. He lost his match against the 2018 World Champion and then World number 1 Kento Momota in two sets, but although he lost his match, China beat Japan 3–1 and won the Thomas Cup. In August, at the BWF World Championships, Chen lost in the semi-finals to his junior, Shi Yuqi again, thus finishing with a bronze medal. At the Asian Games, he helps the Chinese team to win gold after defeating Indonesia in the final. In the individual event, he was eliminated in the quarter-finals by Anthony Ginting again. In September, Chen lost in the quarter-finals of both the Japan and China Open to Khosit Phetpradab and Anthony Ginting respectively. In October, he won his first French Open title by defeating Shi Yuqi in the final. In November, Chen lost in the semi-finals to Kento Momota, at the Fuzhou China Open.

=== 2019: Third Sudirman Cup and Second French Open title ===
Chen began his season at the Malaysia Masters where he reached the final but was defeated by Son Wan-ho in straight games. He then participated in the Indonesia Masters where he lost to Viktor Axelsen in the quarter-finals. In March, he was upset in the first round of the All England Open by Denmark youngster, Rasmus Gemke. Chen followed up his disappointment with a better showing at the Swiss Open where he managed to reach the semi-finals before losing to B. Sai Praneeth. In April, he reached the final of the Malaysia Open but lost to his compatriot Lin Dan. At the Singapore Open, Chen was eliminated by Anthony Ginting in the quarter-finals. At Badminton Asia Championships, he gave a walkover at the quarter-finals due to high fever. In May, Chen was part of the Chinese team that won the Sudirman Cup. In August, he participated in the BWF World Championships and lost to Anders Antonsen in the quarter-finals. In September, Chen was defeated by Kento Momota in the semi-finals of the China Open. In October, Chen finished as a runner-up in the Denmark Open, after losing the Kento Momota again. He then rebounded by winning the French Open, his second consecutive and his first individual title of the year. At the end-year BWF World Tour Finals, he lost to Anthony Ginting in the semi-finals.

=== 2020: Two quarter-finals appearances ===
In 2020, Chen participated in only two tournaments before the COVID-19 outbreak ended his season early. In January, he reached the quarter-finals of the Malaysia Masters where he lost to Viktor Axelsen in three games. Similarly, in March, he reached the quarter-finals of the All England Open but lost to Lee Zii Jia in straight games.

=== 2021: Olympic silver ===
At the delayed 2020 Tokyo Olympics, Chen's first tournament of the year, he managed to reach the final after defeating Raul Must and Pablo Abian in the group stage, Lee Zii Jia in the Round of 16, Chou Tien-chen in the quarter-finals and Anthony Ginting in the semi-finals. However, in the final, he was not able to overcome Viktor Axelsen, thus failing to defend his title from 2016. Fans expressed disappointment towards Chen Long for losing to Axelsen, despite defeating Ginting in the semi finals. At the same time, fans praised him for being good sports even when facing defeat. Zhang Jun, the President of the Chinese Badminton Association, then revealed that Chen's less-than-ideal performance may have been due to a blister on the ball of his foot that had developed during the group stage of the competition and it was so bad that he could not run. He added that he was touched by Chen's fighting spirit to continue playing. This news created a ripple of concern and worry towards his physical health, as he was already battling with previous back injuries. In September, Chen participated in the Chinese National Championships and declared that it will be his last.

== Retirement ==
After not competing on tour since the 2020 Tokyo Olympics, Chen officially announced his retirement from professional badminton at the age of 34. The decision followed discussions with his family, prioritizing their well-being and seeking a more balanced family life. Following his retirement from international competition, he transitioned into coaching to guide the next generation of players. Chen Long serves as the head coach for the Chinese national junior badminton team's men's singles players.

== Honours and awards ==
Due to stellar performance in badminton, Chen was awarded BWF male player of the year twice back-to-back in 2014 and 2015. His retainment of the World Championship crown in 2015 propelled him to be touted as one of the top athletes of the year in China. In 2024, Chen was inducted into the Badminton Hall of Fame in the same class as Lee Yong-dae, a former Korean Men's and Mixed Doubles player.

== Personal life ==
Chen married former World No.1 badminton player Wang Shixian in 2017, after over a decade together. Wang gave birth to a son in June 2019.

Chen Long's surname 谌 was actually pronounced Shèn but the word 谌 is pronounced chén when not used as a surname. As a result of this, mispronunciation happens a lot, and early in his career when he enrolled in China's athlete system his surname was registered incorrectly as Chen. He tried to correct it but failed because of bureaucracy and finally let go of it.

== Achievements ==
=== Olympic Games ===
Men's singles
Year	Venue	Opponent	Score	Result
2012	Wembley Arena; London, Great Britain	(South Korea) Lee Hyun-il	21–12, 15–21, 21–15	Bronze
2016	Riocentro – Pavilion 4 Rio de Janeiro, Brazil	(Malaysia) Lee Chong Wei	21–18, 21–18	Gold
2020	Musashino Forest Sport Plaza; Tokyo, Japan	(Denmark) Viktor Axelsen	15–21, 12–21	Silver

=== World Championships ===
Men's singles
Year	Venue	Opponent	Score	Result
2014	Ballerup Super Arena; Copenhagen, Denmark	(Malaysia) Lee Chong Wei	21–19, 21–19	Gold
2015	Istora Gelora Bung Karno; Jakarta, Indonesia	(Malaysia) Lee Chong Wei	21–14, 21–17	Gold
2017	Emirates Arena; Glasgow, Scotland	(Denmark) Viktor Axelsen	9–21, 10–21	Bronze
2018	Nanjing Youth Olympic Sports Park; Nanjing, China	(China) Shi Yuqi	11–21, 17–21	Bronze

=== Asian Games ===
Men's singles
Year	Venue	Opponent	Score	Result
2014	Gyeyang Gymnasium; Incheon, South Korea	(China) Lin Dan	21–12, 16–21, 16–21	Silver

=== Asian Championships ===
Men's singles
Year	Venue	Opponent	Score	Result
2009	Suwon Indoor Stadium; Suwon, South Korea	(China) Bao Chunlai	21–16, 10–21, 16–21	Silver
2011	Sichuan Gymnasium; Chengdu, China	(China) Bao Chunlai	12–21, 13–21	Bronze
2012	Qingdao Sports Centre Conson Stadium; Qingdao, China	(China) Du Pengyu	21–17, 16–21, 12–21	Bronze
2013	Taipei Arena; Taipei, Taiwan	(China) Du Pengyu	17–21, 19–21	Silver
2015	Wuhan Sports Center Gymnasium; Wuhan, China	(China) Tian Houwei	Walkover	Bronze
2016	Wuhan Sports Center Gymnasium; Wuhan, China	(Malaysia) Lee Chong Wei	17–21, 21–15, 13–21	Silver
2017	Wuhan Sports Center Gymnasium; Wuhan, China	(China) Lin Dan	21–23, 21–11, 21–10	Gold
2018	Wuhan Sports Center Gymnasium; Wuhan, China	(Japan) Kento Momota	17–21, 13–21	Silver

=== World Junior Championships ===
Boys' singles
Year	Venue	Opponent	Score	Result
2007	The Trusts Stadium; Waitakere City, New Zealand	(Japan) Kenichi Tago	21–16, 21–14	Gold

=== Asian Junior Championships ===
Boys' singles
Year	Venue	Opponent	Score	Result
2007	Stadium Juara; Kuala Lumpur, Malaysia	(Malaysia) Mohamad Arif Abdul Latif	18–21, 21–18, 22–20	Gold

=== BWF World Tour (2 titles, 3 runners-up) ===
The BWF World Tour, which was announced on 19 March 2017 and implemented in 2018, is a series of elite badminton tournaments sanctioned by the Badminton World Federation (BWF). The BWF World Tour is divided into levels of World Tour Finals, Super 1000, Super 750, Super 500, Super 300 (part of the HSBC World Tour), and the BWF Tour Super 100.

Men's singles
Year	Tournament	Level	Opponent	Score	Result
2018	French Open	Super 750	(China) Shi Yuqi	21–17, 21–19	(gold) Winner
2019	Malaysia Masters	Super 500	(South Korea) Son Wan-ho	17–21, 19–21	(silver) Runner-up
2019	Malaysia Open	Super 750	(China) Lin Dan	21–9, 17–21, 11–21	(silver) Runner-up
2019	Denmark Open	Super 750	(Japan) Kento Momota	14–21, 12–21	(silver) Runner-up
2019	French Open	Super 750	(Indonesia) Jonatan Christie	21–19, 21–12	(gold) Winner

=== BWF Superseries (20 titles, 12 runners-up) ===
The BWF Superseries, which was launched on 14 December 2006 and implemented in 2007, was a series of elite badminton tournaments, sanctioned by the Badminton World Federation (BWF). BWF Superseries levels were Superseries and Superseries Premier. A season of Superseries consisted of twelve tournaments around the world that had been introduced since 2011. Successful players were invited to the Superseries Finals, which were held at the end of each year.

Men's singles
Year	Tournament	Opponent	Score	Result
2010	Swiss Open	(China) Chen Jin	21–12, 15–21, 17–21	(silver) Runner-up
2010	China Masters	(China) Lin Dan	15–21, 21–13, 14–21	(silver) Runner-up
2010	China Open	(China) Bao Chunlai	9–21, 21–14, 21–16	(gold) Winner
2011	China Masters	(China) Chen Jin	21–16, 22–20	(gold) Winner
2011	Japan Open	(Malaysia) Lee Chong Wei	21–8, 10–21, 21–19	(gold) Winner
2011	Denmark Open	(Malaysia) Lee Chong Wei	21–15, 21–18	(gold) Winner
2011	China Open	(China) Lin Dan	17–21, 24–26	(silver) Runner-up
2011	BWF Super Series Finals	(China) Lin Dan	12–21, 16–21	(silver) Runner-up
2012	China Masters	(Hong Kong) Hu Yun	21–11, 21–13	(gold) Winner
2012	Hong Kong Open	(Malaysia) Lee Chong Wei	21–19, 21–17	(gold) Winner
2012	China Open	(China) Wang Zhengming	21–19, 21–18	(gold) Winner
2012	BWF Super Series Finals	(China) Du Pengyu	21–12, 21–13	(gold) Winner
2013	All England Open	(Malaysia) Lee Chong Wei	21–17, 21–18	(gold) Winner
2013	Denmark Open	(Malaysia) Lee Chong Wei	24–22, 21–19	(gold) Winner
2013	China Open	(China) Wang Zhengming	19–21, 21–8, 21–14	(gold) Winner
2014	Korea Open	(Malaysia) Lee Chong Wei	21–14, 21–15	(gold) Winner
2014	All England Open	(Malaysia) Lee Chong Wei	13–21, 18–21	(silver) Runner-up
2014	India Open	(Malaysia) Lee Chong Wei	13–21, 17–21	(silver) Runner-up
2014	Denmark Open	(South Korea) Son Wan-ho	21–19, 24–22	(gold) Winner
2014	Hong Kong Open	(South Korea) Son Wan-ho	19–21, 16–21	(silver) Runner-up
2014	BWF Super Series Finals	(Denmark) Hans-Kristian Vittinghus	21–16, 21–10	(gold) Winner
2015	All England Open	(Denmark) Jan Ø. Jørgensen	15–21, 21–17, 21–15	(gold) Winner
2015	Malaysia Open	(China) Lin Dan	20–22, 21–13, 21–11	(gold) Winner
2015	Australian Open	(Denmark) Viktor Axelsen	21–12, 14–21, 21–18	(gold) Winner
2015	Korea Open	(India) Ajay Jayaram	21–14, 21–13	(gold) Winner
2015	Denmark Open	(Indonesia) Tommy Sugiarto	21–12, 21–12	(gold) Winner
2015	China Open	(Malaysia) Lee Chong Wei	15–21, 11–21	(silver) Runner-up
2016	Malaysia Open	(Malaysia) Lee Chong Wei	13–21, 8–21	(silver) Runner-up
2016	China Open	(Denmark) Jan Ø. Jørgensen	20–22, 13–21	(silver) Runner-up
2017	Australia Open	(India) Srikanth Kidambi	20–22, 16–21	(silver) Runner-up
2017	China Open	(Denmark) Viktor Axelsen	21–16, 14–21, 21–13	(gold) Winner
2017	Hong Kong Open	(Malaysia) Lee Chong Wei	14–21, 19–21	(silver) Runner-up

BWF Super Series Finals tournament
BWF Super Series Premier tournament
BWF Super Series tournament

=== BWF Grand Prix (5 titles, 3 runners-up) ===
The BWF Grand Prix had two levels, the Grand Prix and Grand Prix Gold. It was a series of badminton tournaments sanctioned by the Badminton World Federation (BWF) and played between 2007 and 2017.

Men's singles
Year	Tournament	Opponent	Score	Result
2009	Malaysia Grand Prix Gold	(Malaysia) Lee Chong Wei	16–21, 9–21	(silver) Runner-up
2009	Philippines Open	(Hong Kong) Hu Yun	21–13, 21–6	(gold) Winner
2010	German Open	(China) Bao Chunlai	13–21, 10–21	(silver) Runner-up
2010	Bitburger Open	(Denmark) Hans-Kristian Vittinghus	21–3, 12–21, 21–9	(gold) Winner
2011	Thailand Open	(South Korea) Lee Hyun-il	21–8, 21–19	(gold) Winner
2013	German Open	(Indonesia) Tommy Sugiarto	21–17, 21–11	(gold) Winner
2015	Chinese Taipei Open	(Chinese Taipei) Chou Tien-chen	15–21, 21–9, 21–6	(gold) Winner
2016	China Masters	(China) Lin Dan	17–21, 21–23	(silver) Runner-up

BWF Grand Prix Gold tournament
BWF Grand Prix tournament

== Performance timeline ==
Key

W	Won	F	Finalist	SF	Semi-finalist
QF	Quarter-finalist	#R	Rounds 4, 3, 2, 1	RR	Round-robin stage
Q#	Qualification round	A	Absent	w/d	Withdrew
G	Gold	S	Silver	B	Bronze
NH	Not held	N/A	Not applicable	DNQ	Did not qualify

Tournament	2007	2008	2009	2010	2011	2012	2013	2014	2015	2016	2017	2018	2019	2020	2021	SR	W–L	Win %
National representation – Individual
Summer Olympic Games	N/A	DNQ	N/A			SF-B; 4–1	N/A			G 5–0	N/A			S 5–1	N/A	1 / 3	14–2	87%
Asian Games	N/A			A	N/A			S 4–1	N/A			QF; 2–1	N/A			0 / 2	6–2	75%
National representation – Team
Thomas Cup	N/A	A	N/A	G 1–0	N/A	G 5–0	N/A	SF-B; 4–1	N/A	QF; 3–1	N/A	G 5–1	N/A	A	N/A	3 / 5	18–3	86%
Sudirman Cup	A	N/A	A	N/A	G 0–0	N/A	G 5–0	N/A	G 2–0	N/A	S 3–0	N/A	G 1–1	N/A	A	3 / 4	11–1	92%
Asian Games	N/A			G 1–0	N/A			S 2–1	N/A			G 3–0	N/A			2 / 3	6–1	86%
East Asian Games	N/A		G 2–0	N/A			G 4–0	N/A			NH	N/A			NH	2 / 2	6–0	100%
Continental Championships
World Championships	A	N/A	Absent		1R; 0–1	N/A	QF; 3–1	G 6–0	G 5–0	N/A	SF-B; 4–1	SF-B; 4–1	QF; 3–1	N/A	A	2 / 7	25–5	83%
Asian Championships	2R; 0–1	A	S 5–1	A	SF-B; 4–1	SF-B; 4–1	S 5–1	A	SF-B; 3–1	S 4–1	G 5–0	S 4–1	QF; 2–1	N/A		1 / 10	36–9	77%
Year-end Championships
BWF World Tour Finals^{[1]}	NH	DNQ		SF; 3–1	F 3–2	W 5–0	DNQ	W 5–0	SF; 3–1	Absent			SF; 1–2	DNQ		2 / 6	20–6	77%
BWF tournaments
Thailand Masters	N/A									Absent				w/d	N/A		0–0	0%
Swiss Open	Absent			F 4–1	A	SF; 4–1	Absent						SF; 3–1	N/A	A	0 / 3	11–3	78%
German Open	Absent		SF; 6–1	F 5–1	Absent		W 6–0	Absent			SF; 4–1	Absent		N/A		1 / 4	21–3	87%
All England Open	Absent			2R; 1–1	SF; 3–1	QF; 2–1	W 5–0	F 4–1	W 5–0	2R; 1–1	2R; 1–1	QF; 2–1	1R; 0–1	QF; 2–1	A	2 / 11	26–9	74%
Malaysia Masters	N/A		F 5–1	Absent								1R; 0–1	F 4–1	QF; 2–1	N/A	0 / 4	11–4	73%
Australian Open	Absent								W 5–0	QF; 2–1	F 4–1	Absent		N/A		1 / 3	11–2	85%
India Open	NH	A	SF; 4–1	Absent				F 4–1	Absent					N/A		0 / 2	8–2	80%
Malaysia Open	Absent			1R; 0–1	SF; 3–1	SF; 3–1	A	QF; 2–1	W 5–0	F 4–1	QF; 2–1	1R; 0–1	F 4–1	N/A		1 / 9	21–8	72%
Singapore Open	Absent				2R; 1–1	Absent			2R; 1–1	QF; 2–1	Absent		QF; 2–1	N/A		0 / 4	6–4	60%
Thailand Open	Absent			NH	W 6–0	Absent		NH	Absent				1R; 0–1	A	N/A	1 / 2	6–1	86%
Korea Open	Absent			SF; 3–1	2R; 1–1	1R; 0–1	1R; 0–1	W 5–0	W 5–0	Absent			1R; 0–1	N/A		2 / 7	14–5	74%
Chinese Taipei Open	Absent								W 6–0	Absent				N/A		1 / 1	6–0	100%
China Open	A	Q2; 1–1	2R; 1–1	W 5–0	F 4–1	W 5–0	W 5–0	2R; 1–1	F 4–1	F 4–1	W 5–0	QF; 2–1	SF; 3–1	N/A		4 / 12	40–8	83%
Japan Open	Absent		2R; 1–1	QF; 2–1	W 5–0	A	1R; 0–1	QF; 2–1	2R; 1–1	Absent		QF; 2–1	1R; 0–1	N/A		1 / 8	13–7	65%
Denmark Open	Absent		QF; 2–1	A	W 5–0	SF; 3–1	W 5–0	W 5–0	W 5–0	A	1R; 0–1	1R; 0–1	F 4–1	Absent		4 / 9	29–5	85%
French Open	Absent		QF; 2–1	A	SF; 3–1	Absent					2R; 1–1	W 5–0	W 5–0	N/A	A	2 / 5	16–3	84%
Bitburger Open	Absent			W 6–0	Absent											1 / 1	6–0	100%
Macau Open	A	2R; 1–1	2R; 1–1	Absent										N/A		0 / 2	2–2	50%
China Masters	Q1; 0–1	1R; 0–1	QF; 2–1	F 4–1	W 5–0	W 5–0	1R; 0–1	Absent		F 5–1	A	SF; 3–1	2R; 1–1	N/A		2 / 10	25–8	76%
Hong Kong Open	Absent		1R; 0–1	SF; 3–1	SF; 3–1	W 5–0	1R; 0–1	F 4–1	QF; 2–1	A	F 4–1	2R; 1–1	QF; 2–1	N/A		1 / 10	24–9	73%
Indonesia Masters	Not Held			Absent							NH	QF; 2–1	QF; 2–1	w/d	A	0 / 2	4–2	66%
Indonesia Open	Absent				SF; 3–1	2R; 1–1	1R; 0–1	SF; 3–1	QF; 2–1	1R; 0–0	QF; 2–1	1R; 0–1	2R; 1–1	N/A	A	0 / 8	12–8	60%
Philippines Open	A	NH	W 5–0	Not Held												1 / 1	5–0	100%
Career Statistics
	2007	2008	2009	2010	2011	2012	2013	2014	2015	2016	2017	2018	2019	2020	2021	Total		
Tournaments played	2	3	13	13	15	13	13	14	15	9	12	16	19	2	1	160		
Titles	0	0	2	4	4	5	6	4	8	1	2	3	2	0	0	41		
Finals reached	0	0	4	7	6	5	7	9	9	5	5	4	5	0	1	67		
Overall win–loss	0–2	2–3	36–11	38–9	49–12	46–8	38–7	51–10	54–7	30–8	35–9	35–14	40–20	4–2	5–1	461–122		
Win percentage	0%	40%	77%	81%	80%	85%	84%	84%	89%	79%	79%	71%	67%	67%	83%	79.07%		
Year-end ranking		212	12	4	3	2	2	1	1	5	4	4	3	5	6	1		

== Record against selected players ==
Record against year-end Finals finalists, World Championships semi-finalists, and Olympic quarter-finalists.

Player	Matches	Won	Lost	Diff.
(China) Bao Chunlai	6	3	3	0
(China) Chen Jin	7	3	4	–1
(China) Du Pengyu	9	5	4	+1
(China) Lin Dan	16	7	9	-2
(China) Shi Yuqi	7	5	2	+3
(China) Tian Houwei	7	5	2	+3
(Chinese Taipei) Chou Tien-chen	10	10	0	+10
(Denmark) Anders Antonsen	7	5	2	+3
(Denmark) Viktor Axelsen	20	14	6	+8
(Denmark) Peter Gade	6	4	2	+2
(Denmark) Jan Ø. Jørgensen	13	11	2	+9
(Denmark) Hans-Kristian Vittinghus	13	12	1	+11
(England) Rajiv Ouseph	7	7	0	+7
(Guatemala) Kevin Cordón	1	0	1	–1
(India) Parupalli Kashyap	10	8	2	+6
(India) Srikanth Kidambi	9	7	2	+5
(India) B. Sai Praneeth	3	2	1	+1

Player	Matches	Won	Lost	Diff.
(Indonesia) Anthony Sinisuka Ginting	13	5	8	–3
(Indonesia) Sony Dwi Kuncoro	4	2	2	0
(Indonesia) Tommy Sugiarto	13	12	1	+11
(Indonesia) Taufik Hidayat	6	4	2	+2
(Japan) Kento Momota	10	5	5	0
(Japan) Sho Sasaki	6	6	0	+6
(Malaysia) Lee Chong Wei	28	13	15	–2
(Malaysia) Liew Daren	6	6	0	+6
(Malaysia) Wong Choong Hann	3	3	0	+3
(South Korea) Heo Kwang-hee	1	1	0	+1
(South Korea) Lee Hyun-il	9	6	3	+3
(South Korea) Park Sung-hwan	3	2	1	+1
(South Korea) Son Wan-ho	18	12	6	+6
(Thailand) Boonsak Ponsana	11	9	2	+7
(Thailand) Kantaphon Wangcharoen	4	3	1	+2
(Vietnam) Nguyễn Tiến Minh	6	4	2	+2
