= Hu Yun =

Hong Kong badminton player (born 1981)

Hu Yun 胡贇
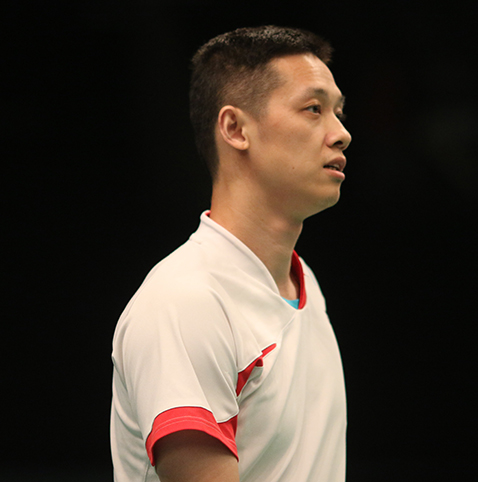

Personal information
- Born: August 31, 1981 (age 45) Wuhan, Hubei, China
- Years active: 13 years
- Height: 1.80 m (5 ft 11 in)
- Weight: 71 kg (157 lb)

Sport
- Country: Hong Kong
- Sport: Badminton
- Handedness: Right
- Coached by: Liu Zhiheng, formerly Li Mao

Men's singles
- Highest ranking: 4 (13 June 2013)
- BWF profile
Medal record
Men's badminton
Representing Hong Kong
East Asian Games
Silver medal – second place	2013 Tianjin	Men's team

Hu Yun
- Traditional Chinese: 胡贇
- Simplified Chinese: 胡赟
Transcriptions
Standard Mandarin
- Hanyu Pinyin: Hú Yūn
Yue: Cantonese
- Jyutping: wu4 wan1

Hu Yun (traditional Chinese: 胡贇; simplified Chinese: 胡赟; pinyin: Hú Yún; born 31 August 1981) is a retired badminton player representing Hong Kong since 2006. He competed at the 2010 and 2014 Asian Games, and also 2016 Rio Olympics. Born in Wuhan, Hubei, China, Hu started playing badminton in 1988, and participated in local province badminton teams at an early age. In 2006, he started to represent Hong Kong at international tournaments. He won the Hong Kong National Badminton Championships four times, in 2007, 2009, 2010, and 2012.

== Achievements ==
=== BWF Superseries ===
The BWF Superseries, launched on 14 December 2006 and implemented in 2007, is a series of elite badminton tournaments, sanctioned by Badminton World Federation (BWF). BWF Superseries has two level such as Superseries and Superseries Premier. A season of Superseries features twelve tournaments around the world, which introduced since 2011, with successful players invited to the Superseries Finals held at the year end.

Men's singles

Year	Tournament	Opponent	Score	Result
2012	China Masters	(China) Chen Long	11–21, 13–21	(silver) Runner-up
2014	Japan Open	(Malaysia) Lee Chong Wei	14–21, 12–21	(silver) Runner-up
2015	Singapore Open	(Japan) Kento Momota	17–21, 21–16, 15–21	(silver) Runner-up

BWF Superseries Finals tournament
BWF Superseries Premier tournament
BWF Superseries tournament

=== BWF Grand Prix ===
The BWF Grand Prix had two levels, the BWF Grand Prix and Grand Prix Gold. It was a series of badminton tournaments sanctioned by the Badminton World Federation (BWF) which was held from 2007 to 2017, and was then replaced by new BWF World Tour.

Men's singles

Year	Tournament	Opponent	Score	Result
2009	Philippines Open	(China) Chen Long	13–21, 6–21	(silver) Runner-up
2016	Thailand Masters	(South Korea) Lee Hyun-il	18–21, 19–21	(silver) Runner-up

BWF Grand Prix Gold tournament
BWF Grand Prix tournament
