= 2021 BWF World Senior Championships – 75+ =

Tournament details
- Dates: 28 November 2021 – 4 December 2021
- Edition: 10
- Level: International
- Competitors: 28 from 13 nations
- Venue: Palacio de los Deportes Carolina Marín
- Location: Huelva, Spain

Champions
- Men's singles: (Denmark) Knud Danielsen
- Women's singles: (England) Mary Jenner
- Men's doubles: (England) Ian Brothers (England) Ray Sharp
- Mixed doubles: (England) Kenneth Tantum (England) Vicki Betts

These are the results of 2021 BWF World Senior Championships' 75+ events. Due to the only one entry the women's doubles event remains cancelled.

== Men's singles ==
1. (Poland) Paweł Gasz (silver medalist)
2. (Germany) Matthias Kiefer (bronze medalist)
3. (England) Ian Brothers (quarter-finals)
4. (Norway) Knut Sverre Liland (second round)

=== Finals ===
Semi-finals
1	(Poland) Paweł Gasz	21	21
(Thailand) Pirachitra Surakkhaka	6	10
(Denmark) Knud Danielsen	21	21
2	(Germany) Matthias Kiefer	18	15

Final
1	(Poland) Paweł Gasz	21	18	18
(Denmark) Knud Danielsen	16	21	21

=== Top half ===
==== Section 1 ====
First Round
(Germany) P Honnen	19	21	21
(India) S Shahare	21	7	12

Second Round
1	(Poland) P Gasz	21	21
(England) K Tantum	10	4
(Denmark) H Johannesen	21	18
(Germany) P Honnen	23	21

Quarter-finals
1	(Poland) P Gasz	21	21
(Germany) P Honnen	6	9

==== Section 2 ====
First Round
(India) S D Kudchadker	22	17
(England) R Sharp	24	21
(Thailand) P Surakkhaka	21	21
(France) F Thomas	10	15

Second Round
3/4	(Norway) K S Liland	18	9
(England) R Sharp	21	21
(Sweden) J Olson	10	15
(Thailand) P Surakkhaka	21	21

Quarter-finals
(England) R Sharp	9	21	19
(Thailand) P Surakkhaka	21	11	21

=== Top half ===
==== Section 3 ====
First Round
(Denmark) K Danielsen	21	21
(Canada) J Lauw	6	8
(Poland) C Gwiazda	21	21
(Germany) P Uhlig	11	16

Second Round
(Denmark) K Danielsen	21	21
(India) M M L Srivastava	11	13
(Poland) C Gwiazda	14	15
3/4	(England) I Brothers	21	21

Quarter-finals
(Denmark) K Danielsen	21	21
3/4	(England) I Brothers	18	15

==== Section 4 ====
First Round
(Spain) J Fernández	10	5
(Netherlands) P van Beek	21	21
(Sweden) D Bengtsson	21	21
(India) D P Thombre	11	7

Second Round
(Netherlands) P van Beek	w	/	o
(France) J Devesa
(Sweden) D Bengtsson	21	15	14
2	(Germany) M Kiefer	17	21	21

Quarter-finals
(Netherlands) P van Beek
2	(Germany) M Kiefer	w	/	o

== Women's singles ==
=== Seed ===
1. (Germany) Elvira Richter (silver medalist)

=== Draw ===
Pos	Team	Pld	W	L	GF	GA	GD	PF	PA	PD	Pts	Results
1	(England) Mary Jenner	2	2	0	4	1	+3	100	73	+27	2	Gold medalist
2	(Germany) Elvira Richter [1]	2	1	1	3	2	+1	97	74	+23	1	Silver medalist
3	(India) Olga D'Costa	2	0	2	0	4	−4	34	84	−50	0	Bronze medalist
4	(England) Beryl Goodall	0	0	0	0	0	0	0	0	0	0	Withdrew

Source: Draw

Date	Time	Player 1	Score	Player 2	Set 1	Set 2	Set 3
Dec 1	15:45	Mary Jenner (England)	2–0	(India) Olga D'Costa	21–6	21–12	
Dec 2		Elvira Richter (Germany)	2–0	(India) Olga D'Costa	21–4	21–12	
Dec 4		Elvira Richter (Germany)	1–2	(England) Mary Jenner	21–16	15–21	19–21

== Men's doubles ==
=== Seeds ===
1. (Poland) Paweł Gasz / Czesław Gwiazda (bronze medalists)
2. (England) Ian Brothers / Ray Sharp (gold medalists)

=== Group A ===
Pos	Team	Pld	W	L	GF	GA	GD	PF	PA	PD	Pts	Qualification
1	(Norway) Knut Sverre Liland (Thailand) Pirachitra Surakkhaka	2	2	0	4	1	+3	103	67	+36	2	Advanced to semi-finals
2	(Poland) Paweł Gasz [1] (Poland) Czesław Gwiazda	2	1	1	3	2	+1	91	97	−6	1	Advanced to semi-finals
3	(Germany) Matthias Kiefer (Germany) Peter Uhlig	2	0	2	0	4	−4	54	84	−30	0	
4	(France) Joseph Devesa (Denmark) Jørn Gilsaa	0	0	0	0	0	0	0	0	0	0	Withdrew

Source: Draw

Date	Time	Player 1	Score	Player 2	Set 1	Set 2	Set 3
Nov 28	16:00	Paweł Gasz (Poland); Czesław Gwiazda (Poland)	1–2	(Norway) Knut Sverre Liland (Thailand) Pirachitra Surakkhaka	10–21	21–19	18–21
Nov 30	13:00	Paweł Gasz (Poland); Czeslaw Gwiazda (Poland)	2–0	(Germany) Matthias Kiefer (Germany) Peter Uhlig	21–18	21–18	
Dec 2		Matthias Kiefer (Germany); Peter Uhlig (Germany)	0–2	(Norway) Knut Sverre Liland (Thailand) Pirachitra Surakkhaka	7–21	11–21	

=== Group B ===
Pos	Team	Pld	W	L	GF	GA	GD	PF	PA	PD	Pts	Qualification
1	(England) Ian Brothers [2] (England) Ray Sharp	3	3	0	6	1	+5	139	100	+39	3	Advanced to semi-finals
2	(Sweden) Denis Bengtsson (England) Kenneth Tantum	3	2	1	5	2	+3	142	104	+38	2	Advanced to semi-finals
3	(Denmark) Heini Johannesen [SUB] (France) François Thomas	3	1	2	2	5	−3	104	132	−28	1	
4	(India) Sudam Shahare (India) Damodar Pandurang Thombre	3	0	3	1	6	−5	89	138	−49	0	

Source: Draw

Date	Time	Player 1	Score	Player 2	Set 1	Set 2	Set 3
Nov 28	16:00	Heini Johannesen (Denmark); François Thomas (France)	0–2	(Sweden) Denis Bengtsson (England) Kenneth Tantum	16–21	9–21	
Nov 28	16:00	Ian Brothers (England); Ray Sharp (England)	2–0	(India) Sudam Shahare (India) Damodar Pandurang Thombre	21–6	21–11	
Nov 30	14:00	Denis Bengtsson (Sweden); Kenneth Tantum (England)	2–0	(India) Sudam Shahare (India) Damodar Pandurang Thombre	21–12	21–12	
Nov 30	15:30	Ian Brothers (England); Ray Sharp (England)	2–0	(Denmark) Heini Johannesen (France) François Thomas	21–14	21–11	
Dec 2		Ian Brothers (England); Ray Sharp (England)	2–1	(Sweden) Denis Bengtsson (England) Kenneth Tantum	21–19	13–21	21–18
Dec 2		Heini Johannesen (Denmark); François Thomas (France)	2–1	(India) Sudam Shahare (India) Damodar Pandurang Thombre	12–21	21–10	21–17

=== Finals ===
Semi-finals
A1	(Norway) Knut Sverre Liland (Thailand) Pirachitra Surakkhaka	21	21
B2	(Sweden) Denis Bengtsson (England) Kenneth Tantum	15	19
A2	(Poland) Paweł Gasz (Poland) Czesław Gwiazda	13	21	15
B1	(England) Ian Brothers (England) Ray Sharp	21	9	21

Final
A1	(Norway) Knut Sverre Liland (Thailand) Pirachitra Surakkhaka	17	10
B1	(England) Ian Brothers (England) Ray Sharp	21	21

== Mixed doubles ==
=== Seeds ===
1. (Poland) Paweł Gasz / (England) Beryl Goodall (withdrew)
2. (Denmark) Heini Johannesen / Maria Caridad Romero (group stage)

=== Group A ===
Pos	Team	Pld	W	L	GF	GA	GD	PF	PA	PD	Pts	
1	(England) Ray Sharp (England) Mary Jenner	1	1	0	2	1	+1	56	40	+16	1	Advanced to semi-finals
2	(Germany) Mattias Kiefer (Germany) Elvira Richter	1	0	1	1	2	−1	40	56	−16	0	Advanced to semi-finals
3	(Poland) Paweł Gasz [1] (England) Beryl Goodall	0	0	0	0	0	0	0	0	0	0	Withdrew

Source: Draw

Date	Time	Player 1	Score	Player 2	Set 1	Set 2	Set 3
Nov 28	19:30	Ray Sharp (England); Mary Jenner (England)	2–1	(Germany) Mattias Kiefer (Germany) Elvira Richter	14–21	21–9	21–10

=== Group B ===
Pos	Team	Pld	W	L	GF	GA	GD	PF	PA	PD	Pts	Qualification
1	(England) Kenneth Tantum (England) Vicki Betts	2	2	0	4	0	+4	84	39	+45	2	Advanced to semi-finals
2	(Norway) Kunt Sverre Liland (Sweden) Lisbeth Bengtsson	2	1	1	2	2	0	54	75	−21	1	Advanced to semi-finals
3	(Denmark) Heini Johannesen [2] (Peru) Maria Caridad Romero	2	0	2	0	4	−4	60	84	−24	0	

Source: Draw

Date	Time	Player 1	Score	Player 2	Set 1	Set 2	Set 3
Nov 28	19:30	Kenneth Tantum (England); Vicki Betts (England)	2–0	(Norway) Kunt Sverre Liland (Sweden) Lisbeth Bengtsson	21–6	21–6	
Nov 29	9:10	Heini Johannesen (Denmark); Maria Caridad Romero (Peru)	0–2	(England) Kenneth Tantum (England) Vicki Betts	17–21	10–21	
Dec 2		Heini Johannesen (Denmark); Maria Caridad Romero (Peru)	0–2	(Norway) Kunt Sverre Liland (Sweden) Lisbeth Bengtsson	17–21	16–21	

=== Finals ===
Semi-finals
A1	(England) Ray Sharp (England) Mary Jenner	21	21
B2	(Norway) Kunt Sverre Liland (Sweden) Lisbeth Bengtsson	12	12
A2	(Germany) Mattias Kiefer (Germany) Elvira Richter	7	10
B1	(England) Kenneth Tantum (England) Vicki Betts	21	21

Final
A1	(England) Ray Sharp (England) Mary Jenner	8	18
B1	(England) Kenneth Tantum (England) Vicki Betts	21	21
