= Boonsak Ponsana =

Thai badminton player (born 1982)

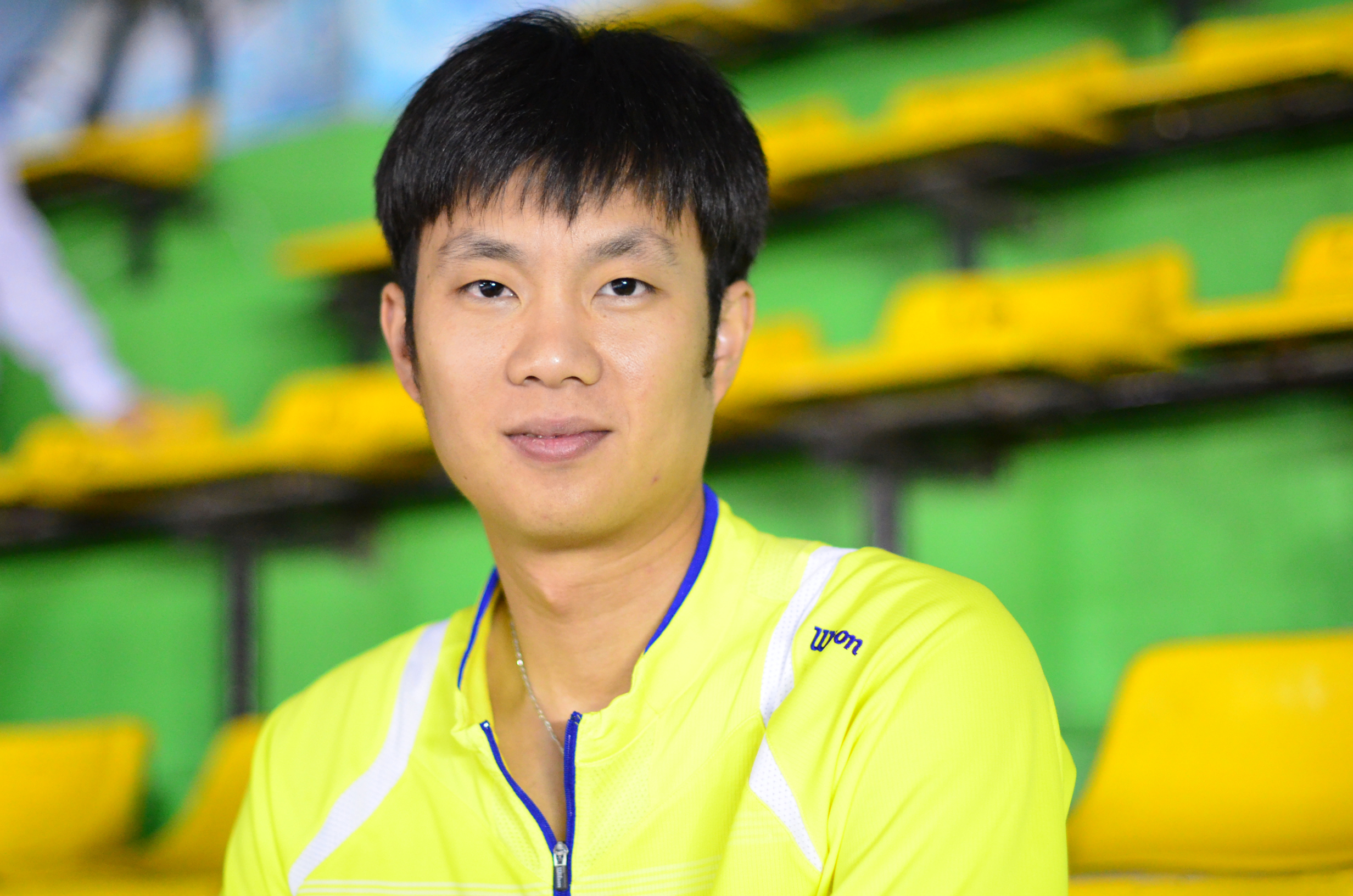
- Boonsak Ponsana in 2013.

Personal information
- Born: 22 February 1982 (age 44) Bangkok, Thailand
- Height: 1.80 m (5 ft 11 in)
- Weight: 72 kg (159 lb)

Sport
- Country: Thailand
- Sport: Badminton
- Handedness: Right

Men's singles
- Highest ranking: 4 (November 2010)
- BWF profile
Medal record
Men's badminton
Representing Thailand
World Cup
Silver medal – second place	2005 Yiyang	Men's singles
Sudirman Cup
Bronze medal – third place	2013 Kuala Lumpur	Mixed team
Asian Games
Bronze medal – third place	2010 Guangzhou	Men's team
Asia Championships
Silver medal – second place	2006 Johor Bahru	Men's singles
Bronze medal – third place	2010 New Delhi	Men's singles
SEA Games
Silver medal – second place	2001 Kuala Lumpur	Men's singles
Silver medal – second place	2003 Ho Chi Minh	Men's team
Silver medal – second place	2015 Singapore	Men's team
Bronze medal – third place	1999 Bandar Seri Begawan	Men's team
Bronze medal – third place	2001 Kuala Lumpur	Men's team
Bronze medal – third place	2005 Manila	Men's team
Bronze medal – third place	2007 Nakhon Ratchasima	Men's singles
Bronze medal – third place	2007 Nakhon Ratchasima	Men's team
Bronze medal – third place	2009 Vientiane	Men's team
Summer Universiade
Gold medal – first place	2007 Bangkok	Men's singles
Gold medal – first place	2007 Bangkok	Mixed team
World Senior Championships
Gold medal – first place	2021 Huelva	Men's doubles
Silver medal – second place	2025 Pattaya	Men's doubles 40+
Bronze medal – third place	2021 Huelva	Men's singles

Boonsak Ponsana (Thai: บุญศักดิ์ พลสนะ; RTGS: Bunsak Phonsana; born 22 February 1982) is a Thai badminton player. His younger sister Salakjit Ponsana is also part of the Thailand badminton team. He got a Bachelor of Laws from Sripatum University.

== Career ==
Ponsana competed at the 2000 Summer Olympics, but was defeated in the round of 64. At the 2004 Summer Olympics, he was defeating Chris Dednam of South Africa and Lee Hyun-il of South Korea in the first two rounds. In the quarterfinals, Ponsana defeated Ronald Susilo of Singapore 15–10, 15–1. He advanced to the semifinals, in which he lost to Taufik Hidayat of Indonesia 15–9, 15–2. Playing in the bronze medal match, he again lost to an Indonesian, this time Soni Dwi Kuncoro by a score of 15–11, 17-16 for a fourth-place finish. At the 2008 Summer Olympics, he reached the second round of the men's singles, where he lost 2 – 0 to Indonesia's Sony Dwi Kuncoro.

In 2007, he won the gold medals at the Summer Universiade in the men's singles and mixed team event. He also won some international tournament in 2004 Thailand Open, 2007 Singapore Open, and in 2008 India Open. He competed in 2009 Superseries Finals but he did not qualify for the semi-finals. He played for Thailand in 2009 SEA Games in Laos, helping to win a bronze medal for Thailand in men's team. In 2012, he repeated his successful run at the Singapore Open Super Series beating Wang Zhengming of China in a thrilling two set match. Prior to his participation in the 2012 Singapore Open, injury had caused him to skip some tournaments in 2011, and his earlier 2012 results had not been especially good, although he did qualify for the Olympics again. In 2013, Boonsak has changed his speciality to men's doubles and he is now teaming with Songphon Anugritayawon.

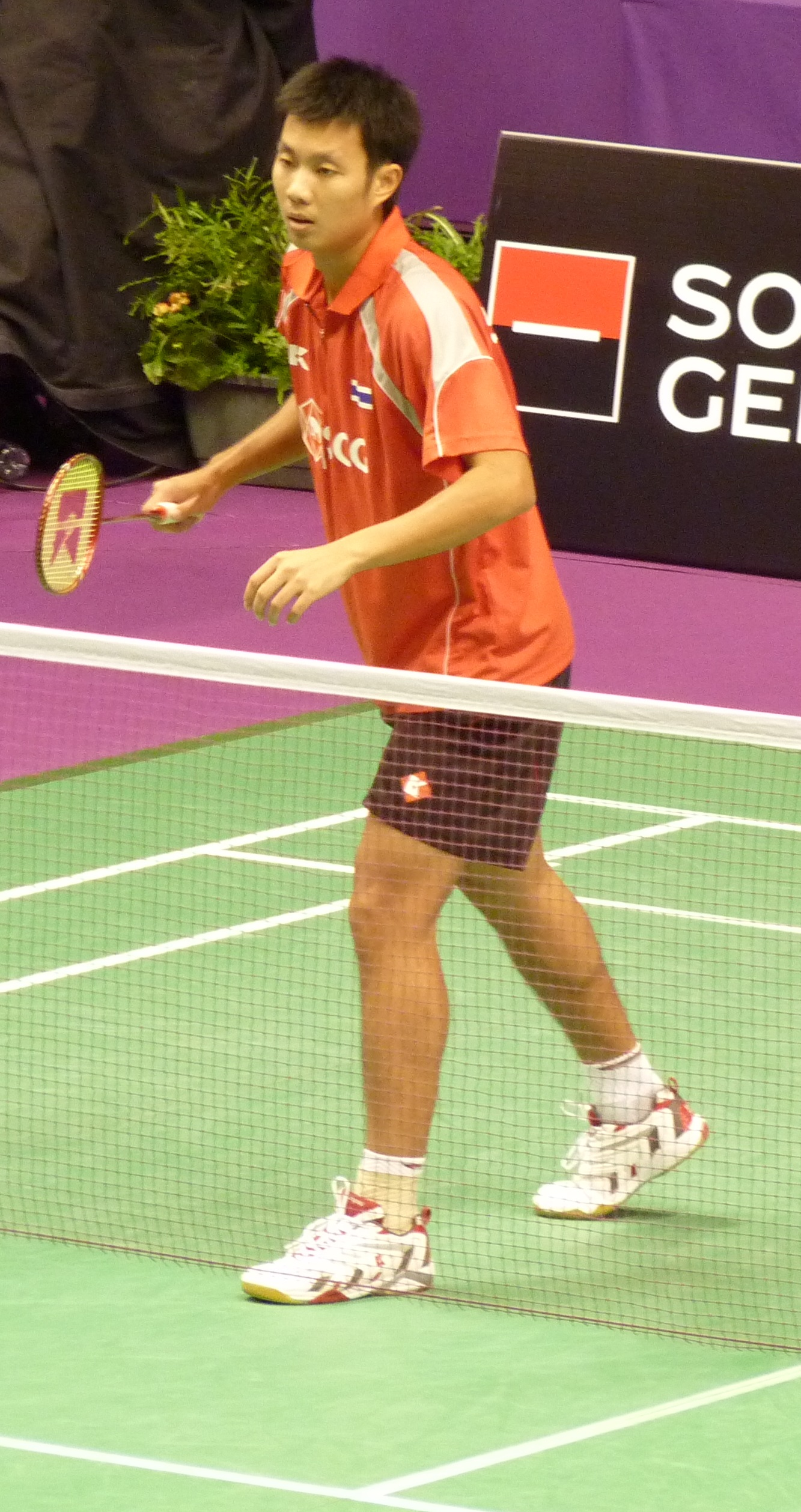
Ponsana at the 2010 World Championships

== Achievements ==
=== World Cup ===
Men's singles
Year	Venue	Opponent	Score	Result
2005	Olympic Park, Yiyang, China	(China) Lin Dan	14–21, 11–21	Silver

=== Asian Championships ===
Men's singles
Year	Venue	Opponent	Score	Result
2006	Bandaraya Stadium, Johor Bahru, Malaysia	(Malaysia) Lee Chong Wei	12–21, 16–21	Silver
2010	Siri Fort Indoor Stadium, New Delhi, India	(China) Lin Dan	20–22, 10–21	Bronze

=== SEA Games ===
Men's singles
Year	Venue	Opponent	Score	Result
2001	Malawati Stadium, Selangor, Malaysia	(Malaysia) Roslin Hashim	14–17, 3–15	Silver
2007	Wongchawalitkul University, Nakhon Ratchasima, Thailand	(Singapore) Kendrick Lee	15–21, 20–22	Bronze

=== Summer Universiade ===
Men's singles
Year	Venue	Opponent	Score	Result
2007	Thammasat University, Pathum Thani, Thailand	(China) Chen Hong	17–21, 21–15, 21–17	Gold

=== World Senior Championships ===
Men's singles
Year	Age	Venue	Opponent	Score	Result
2021	35+	Palacio de los Deportes Carolina Marín; Heulva, Spain	(Chinese Taipei) Hsueh Hsuan-yi	21–17, 17–21, 8–21	Bronze

Men's doubles
Year	Age	Venue	Partner	Opponent	Score	Result	Ref.
2021	35+	Palacio de los Deportes Carolina Marín; Heulva, Spain	(Thailand) Jakrapan Thanathiratham	(India) Padmanabha Raghavan (India) Varun Sharma	21–12, 21–12	Gold	
2025	40+	Eastern National Sports Training Centre; Pattaya, Thailand	(Thailand) Jakrapan Thanathiratham	(United States) Tony Gunawan (Indonesia) Hendra Setiawan	18–21, 16–21	Silver	

=== BWF Superseries ===
The BWF Superseries, which was launched on 14 December 2006 and implemented in 2007, was a series of elite badminton tournaments, sanctioned by the Badminton World Federation (BWF). BWF Superseries levels were Superseries and Superseries Premier. A season of Superseries consisted of twelve tournaments around the world that had been introduced since 2011. Successful players were invited to the Superseries Finals, which were held at the end of each year.

Men's singles
Year	Tournament	Opponent	Score	Result
2007	Singapore Open	(China) Chen Yu	21–17, 21–14	(gold) Winner
2009	Singapore Open	(China) Bao Chunlai	19–21, 21–16, 15–21	(silver) Runner-up
2009	China Masters	(China) Lin Dan	17–21, 17–21	(silver) Runner-up
2010	Malaysia Open	(Malaysia) Lee Chong Wei	13–21, 7–21	(silver) Runner-up
2010	Singapore Open	(Indonesia) Sony Dwi Kuncoro	16–21, 16–21	(silver) Runner-up
2012	Singapore Open	(China) Wang Zhengming	21–18, 21–19	(gold) Winner
2012	Japan Open	(Malaysia) Lee Chong Wei	18–21, 18–21	(silver) Runner-up
2013	Singapore Open	(Indonesia) Tommy Sugiarto	22–20, 5–21, 17–21	(silver) Runner-up

BWF Super Series Finals tournament
BWF Super Series Premier tournament
BWF Super Series tournament

=== BWF Grand Prix ===
The BWF Grand Prix had two levels, the Grand Prix and Grand Prix Gold. It was a series of badminton tournaments sanctioned by the Badminton World Federation (BWF) and played between 2007 and 2017. The World Badminton Grand Prix was sanctioned by the International Badminton Federation from 1983 to 2006.

Men's singles
Year	Tournament	Opponent	Score	Result
2001	Hong Kong Open	(South Korea) Shon Seung-mo	2–7, 7–4, 7–8, 8–7, 3–7	(silver) Runner-up
2001	Thailand Open	(Malaysia) Yong Hock Kin	8–7, 7–5, 6–8, 1–7, 1–7	(silver) Runner-up
2003	Thailand Open	(Singapore) Ronald Susilo	10–15, 15–7, 10–15	(silver) Runner-up
2003	Hong Kong Open	(China) Lin Dan	4–15, 15–9, 8–15	(silver) Runner-up
2004	Thailand Open	(Hong Kong) Ng Wei	15–3, 15–3	(gold) Winner
2005	Indonesia Open	(South Korea) Lee Hyun-il	10–15, 3–15	(silver) Runner-up
2007	Thailand Open	(China) Chen Hong	14–21, 21–11, 21–23	(silver) Runner-up
2008	India Open	(India) Chetan Anand	21–16, 21–12	(gold) Winner
2008	Thailand Open	(China) Lin Dan	21–17, 15–21, 13–21	(silver) Runner-up
2009	Thailand Open	(Vietnam) Nguyễn Tiến Minh	16–21, 13–21	(silver) Runner-up
2013	Thailand Open	(India) Srikanth Kidambi	16–21, 12–21	(silver) Runner-up

BWF Grand Prix Gold tournament
BWF Grand Prix tournament

=== IBF International ===
Men's singles
Year	Tournament	Opponent	Score	Result
1999	Myanmar International	(Thailand) Anuphap Theeraratsakul	15–3, 15–6	(gold) Winner
2003	Smiling Fish Satellite	(Thailand) Thirayu Laohathaimongkol	15–7, 15–0	(gold) Winner

== Record against selected opponents ==
Includes results from all competitions 2001–present against Super Series finalists, World Championship semifinalists and Olympic quarterfinalists.

- (China) Lin Dan 1–12
- (China) Xia Xuanze 1–0
- (China) Chen Jin 5–4
- (China) Bao Chunlai 2–6
- (China) Chen Hong 5–4
- (China) Chen Long 2–9
- (China) Du Pengyu 2–4
- (China) Chen Yu 3–3
- (Denmark) Jan Ø. Jørgensen 2–11
- (Denmark) Peter Gade 3–4
- (Denmark) Viktor Axelsen 1–3
- (Guatemala) Kevin Cordón 1–0
- (India) Parupalli Kashyap 1–4
- (Indonesia) Taufik Hidayat 4–13
- (Indonesia) Sony Dwi Kuncoro 5–7
- (Indonesia) Hendrawan 0–1
- (Indonesia) Tommy Sugiarto 2–5
- (Japan) Sho Sasaki 7–3
- (South Korea) Lee Hyun-il 7–7
- (South Korea) Shon Seung-mo 3–4
- (South Korea) Park Sung-hwan 1–4
- (South Korea) Son Wan-ho 1–1
- (Malaysia) Wong Choong Hann 5–4
- (Malaysia) Lee Chong Wei 2–27
- (Malaysia) Liew Daren 2–3
- (Singapore) Ronald Susilo 7–2

== See also ==
- List of athletes with the most appearances at Olympic Games
