= 2021 BWF World Senior Championships – 35+ =

Tournament details
- Dates: 28 November 2021 – 4 December 2021
- Edition: 10
- Level: International
- Nations: 25
- Venue: Palacio de los Deportes Carolina Marín
- Location: Huelva, Spain

Champions
- Men's singles: (France) Anthony Nelson
- Women's singles: (Portugal) Telma Santos
- Men's doubles: (Thailand) Boonsak Ponsana (Thailand) Jakrapan Thanathiratham
- Women's doubles: (Denmark) Gry Uhrenholt Hermansen (Denmark) Helle Kæmpegaard
- Mixed doubles: (Denmark) Tommy Sørensen (Denmark) Gry Uhrenholt Hermansen

These are the results of 2021 BWF World Senior Championships' 35+ events.

== Men's singles ==
=== Seeds ===
1. (Chinese Taipei) Chao Chun-ken (quarter-finals)
2. (Thailand) Boonsak Ponsana (bronze medalist)
3. (India) Manish Rawat (bronze medalist)
4. (Chinese Taipei) Hsueh Hsuan-yi (silver medalist)
5. (England) Andrew Aspinal (quarter-finals)
6. (Denmark) Niels Christian Blittrup (withdrew)
7. (France) Anthony Nelson (gold medalist)
8. (India) Mayank Behal (quarter-finals)

=== Finals ===
Semi-finals
5/8	(France) Anthony Nelson	21	21
3/4	(India) Manish Rawat	17	17
3/4	(Chinese Taipei) Hsueh Hsuan-yi	17	21	21
2	(Thailand) Boonsak Ponsana	21	17	8

Final
5/8	(France) Anthony Nelson	w	/	o
3/4	(Chinese Taipei) Hsueh Hsuan-yi

=== Top half ===
==== Section 1 ====
First round
(Spain) J V Martínez	21	21
(India) P Naithani	14	14
(Mongolia) M Erdenekhuu	5	5
(Germany) M Prinz	21	21
(Estonia) M Soo	21	21
(Switzerland) B Galent	11	13
(India) Y Chauhan	21	21
(Spain) A Ramos	15	4
(Germany) S Nieke	21	21
(Sweden) S Nilebring	6	9

Second round
1	(Chinese Taipei) Chao C-k	21	18	21
(Spain) J V Martínez	10	21	12
(England) M Law	14	12
(Germany) M Prinz	21	21
5/8	(France) A Nelson	21	21
(Estonia) M Soo	14	5
(India) Y Chauhan	19	12
(Germany) S Nieke	21	21

Third round
1	(Chinese Taipei) Chao C-k	w	/	o
(Germany) M Prinz
5/8	(France) A Nelson	21	21
(Germany) S Nieke	12	9

Quarter-finals
1	(Chinese Taipei) Chao C-k	12	14
5/8	(France) A Nelson	21	21

==== Section 2 ====
First round
(Spain) V Medina	10	12
(France) B Cazau	21	21
(England) H Fisher	7	9
(Germany) F Disic	21	21
(Germany) S Hohenberg	21	21
(Spain) S López	6	18
(Poland) A Putteeraj	9	17
(Latvia) O Koziņecs	21	21
(France) P Robas	17	21	16
(Portugal) L M Silva	21	9	21

Second round
3/4	(India) M Rawat	21	21
(France) B Cazau	15	15
(Chinese Taipei) Li C-c	12	18
(Germany) F Disic	21	21
5/8	(Denmark) N C Blittrup
(Germany) S Hohenberg	w	/	o
(Latvia) O Koziņecs	11	21	26
(Portugal) L M Silva	21	14	28

Third round
3/4	(India) M Rawat	21	21
(Germany) F Disic	9	13
(Germany) S Hohenberg	10	20
(Portugal) L M Silva	21	22

Quarter-finals
3/4	(India) M Rawat	21	21
(Portugal) L M Silva	11	+

=== Bottom half ===
==== Section 3 ====
First round
(Germany) A Henke	19	21	21
(Spain) Á Rodríguez	21	9	14
(France) F Cazau	21	21
(Portugal) M Branco	15	19
(England) M Burgeman	5	6
(Israel) Y Kovalev	21	21
(Spain) A Casquero	21	13	24
(Germany) F Schlosser	14	13	26
(Latvia) V Bajārs	11	17
(India) A Agarwal	21	21

Second round
(Germany) A Henke	21	21
(France) F Cazau	8	10
(Israel) Y Kovalev	7	17
5/8	(India) M Behal	21	21
(Germany) F Schlosser	12	15
(France) N Sejournant	21	21
(India) A Agarwal	3	5
3/4	(Chinese Taipei) Hsueh H-y	21	21

Third round
(Germany) A Henke	16	8
5/8	(India) M Behal	21	21
(France) N Sejournant	4	5
3/4	(Chinese Taipei) Hsueh H-y	21	21

Quarter-finals
5/8	(India) M Behal	8	9
3/4	(Chinese Taipei) Hsueh H-y	21	21

==== Section 4 ====
First round
(Spain) M Gómez	21	21
(Mongolia) U Sanjaa	2	4
(Russia) E Shulmeister	10	11
(Chinese Taipei) Tsai M-h	21	21
(India) A Sethi	18	16
(Germany) T Dahlbüding	21	21
SUB	(France) L Baricault	10	10
(Ukraine) M Shkliaiev	21	21
(Germany) E Klitsch	w	/	o
(India) J Kumar G.

Second round
(Spain) M Gómez	17	12
(Chinese Taipei) Tsai M-h	21	21
(Germany) T Dahlbüding	21	11	20
5/8	(England) A Aspinal	14	21	22
(Ukraine) M Shkliaiev	21	21
(Spain) D Hernansanz	8	14
(Germany) E Klitsch	7	9
2	(Thailand) B Ponsana	21	21

Third round
(Chinese Taipei) Tsai M-h	21	21	12
5/8	(England) A Aspinal	17	23	21
(Ukraine) M Shkliaiev	11	7
2	(Thailand) B Ponsana	21	21

Quarter-finals
5/8	(England) A Aspinal	6	7
2	(Thailand) B Ponsana	21	21

== Women's singles ==
=== Seeds ===
1. (Switzerland) Ava Monney (second round)
2. (Bulgaria) Maya Dobreva (silver medalist)
3. (Poland) Dominika Cygan (second round)
4. (India) Parul Rawat (quarter-finals)

=== Finals ===
Semi-finals
(France) Audrey Petit
(Portugal) Telma Santos	w	/	o
(Germany) Nicole Bartsch	17	13
2	(Bulgaria) Maya Dobreva	21	21

Final
(Portugal) Telma Santos	21	21
2	(Bulgaria) Maya Dobreva	12	7

=== Top half ===
==== Section 1 ====
First round
(France) A Petit	21	21
(Sri Lanka) Nadeesha G	16	12
(India) S Melasheemi	21	21
(Germany) C Klitsch	11	10

Second round
1	(Switzerland) A Monney	21	18	16
(France) A Petit	18	21	21
(Spain) C Puebla	2	7
(India) S Melasheemi	21	21

Quarter-finals
(France) A Petit	21	21
(India) S Melasheemi	13	14

==== Section 2 ====
First round
(Portugal) T Santos	21	21
(Spain) M I Saez	1	7
(India) B Yupu	20	8
(France) F Reynaud	22	21
(Italy) M T T Nguyen	21	21
(Germany) P Zimmermann	19	15

Second round
3/4	(Poland) D Cygan	7	5
(Portugal) T Santos	21	21
(France) F Reynaud	15	21	21
(Italy) M T T Nguyen	21	18	17

Quarter-finals
(Portugal) T Santos	21	21
(France) F Reynaud	6	4

=== Bottom half ===
==== Section 3 ====
First round
(Spain) S del Busto	21	21
(Finland) L Ahonen	16	10
(Germany) N Bartsch	21	21
(Norway) M Formo	16	17
(France) Y Le Lan	19	23	7
(Russia) N Riazanova	21	21	21

Second round
(Spain) S del Busto	9	15
(Germany) N Bartsch	21	21
(Russia) N Riazanova	11	8
3/4	(India) P Rawat	21	21

Quarter-finals
(Germany) N Bartsch	21	21
3/4	(India) P Rawat	6	18

==== Section 4 ====
First round
(India) M Kohli	21	16	21
(France) C Dubuisson	12	21	15
(Ukraine) N Igronova	18	14
(Germany) A Seifert	21	21
(India) D Ramesh
(Spain) I Aparicio	w	/	o

Second round
(India) M Kohli	9	13
(Germany) A Seifert	21	21
(Spain) I Aparicio	12	10
2	(Bulgaria) M Dobreva	21	21

Quarter-finals
(Germany) A Seifert	17	11
2	(Bulgaria) M Dobreva	21	21

== Men's doubles ==
=== Seeds ===
1. (Denmark) Niels Christian Blittrup / Casper Lund (quarter-finals)
2. (Thailand) Naruenart Chuaymak / Rungsan Thipsotikul (second round)
3. (India) Prashant Bahatre / Manish Rawat (second round)
4. (Thailand) Boonsak Ponsana / Jakrapan Thanathiratham (gold medalists)
5. (India) Abhishek Agarwal / Mahammad Danish Khan (third round)
6. (England) Andrew Aspinal / Mark Law (quarter-finals)
7. (England) Mark Burgeman / Howard Fisher (second round)
8. (Chinese Taipei) Chao Chun-ken / Tsai Ming-hsin (bronze medalists)

=== Finals ===
Semi-finals
(France) Bruno Cazau (France) Anthony Nelson	14	12
3/4	(Thailand) Boonsak Ponsana (Thailand) Jakrapan Thanathiratham	21	21
5/8	(Chinese Taipei) Chao Chun-kun (Chinese Taipei) Tsai Ming-hsin	19	11
(India) Padmanabha Raghavan (India) Varun Sharma	21	21

Final
3/4	(Thailand) Boonsak Ponsana (Thailand) Jakrapan Thanathiratham	21	21
(India) Padmanabha Raghavan (India) Varun Sharma	12	12

=== Top half ===
==== Section 1 ====
First round
SUB	(Poland) B Grabowski (Switzerland) A Neuwiler	21	13	21
(India) L Raj D. (India) V. A V Y Varatharajaperumal	17	21	17
(Spain) F Gil (Spain) M Gómez	10	9
(France) B Cazau (France) A Nelson	21	21

Second round
1	(Denmark) N C Blittrup (Denmark) C Lund	21	21
(Spain) J Martínez (Spain) Á Rodríguez	9	10
(Chinese Taipei) Li C-c (Estonia) M Soo	21	21
(Poland) B Grabowski (Switzerland) A Neuwiler	7	8
5/8	(India) A Agarwal (India) M D Khan	21	21
(Latvia) V Bajārs (Latvia) I Kelmers	15	13
(Germany) F Schlosser (Germany) S Tatar	12	14
(France) B Cazau (France) A Nelson	21	21

Third round
1	(Denmark) N C Blittrup (Denmark) C Lund	21	21
(Chinese Taipei) Li C-c (Estonia) M Soo	13	8
5/8	(India) A Agarwal (India) M D Khan	13	15
(France) B Cazau (France) A Nelson	21	21

Quarter-finals
1	(Denmark) N C Blittrup (Denmark) C Lund	17^{r}
(France) B Cazau (France) A Nelson	17

==== Section 2 ====
First round
(India) M Behal (India) P Naithani	13	21	21
(Germany) A Henke (Germany) S Nieke	21	16	17
(Spain) M A Alcover (Spain) R Cuevas	21	16	18
SUB	(France) P Robas (Belgium) J Van den Brande	14	21	21

Second round
3/4	(Thailand) B Ponsana (Thailand) J Thanathiratham	21	21
(Spain) D Hernansanz (Spain) S López	8	8
(Germany) E Klitsch (Netherlands) E Tan	17	18
(India) M Behal (India) P Naithani	21	21
5/8	(England) A Aspinal (England) M Law	21	21
(India) A Saxena (India) D B Thapa	12	14
(Germany) T Dahjl Büding (Germany) F Disic	21	22
SUB	(France) P Robas (Belgium) J Van den Brande	19	20

Third round
3/4	(Thailand) B Ponsana (Thailand) J Thanathiratham	21	21
(India) M Behal (India) P Naithani	12	12
5/8	(England) A Aspinal (England) M Law	21	21
(Germany) T Dahjl Büding (Germany) F Disic	17	15

Quarter-finals
3/4	(Thailand) B Ponsana (Thailand) J Thanathiratham	21	21
5/8	(England) A Aspinal (England) M Law	16	12

=== Bottom half ===
==== Section 3 ====
First round
(Poland) A Putteeraj (Poland) A Szymczak	12	14
(Switzerland) B Galent (Switzerland) J Scheffler	21	21
(Spain) F Herrero (Spain) V Medina	12	17
(Germany) S Hohenberg (Germany) T Kunkel	21	21

Second round
(Switzerland) B Galent (Switzerland) J Scheffler	21	21
(Spain) S Latorre (Spain) J Romero	18	14
(India) M Christopher M. P. (India) R K Navaneethakrishnan	14	9
5/8	(Chinese Taipei) Chao C-k (Chinese Taipei) Tsai M-h	21	21
(Germany) S Hohenberg (Germany) T Kunkel	21	21
(Mongolia) M Erdenekhuu (Mongolia) U Sanjaa	9	9
(France) V Ly (France) A Martin	19	21	21
3/4	(India) P Bahatre (India) M Rawat	21	14	18

Third round
(Switzerland) B Galent (Switzerland) J Scheffler	6	9
5/8	(Chinese Taipei) Chao C-k (Chinese Taipei) Tsai M-h	21	21
(Germany) S Hohenberg (Germany) T Kunkel	16	18
(France) V Ly (France) A Martin	21	21

Quarter-finals
5/8	(Chinese Taipei) Chao C-k (Chinese Taipei) Tsai M-h	17	21	21
(France) V Ly (France) A Martin	21	14	14

==== Section 4 ====
First round
(France) F Cazau (France) N Sejournant	11	17
(India) P Gupta (India) A Sethi	21	21
(France) L Baricault (France) S Forgues	11	10
(Spain) A Casquero (Spain) A Rico	21	21

Second round
(India) P Gupta (India) A Sethi	21	14	21
(Portugal) M Branco (Portugal) L M Silva	11	21	14
(Spain) R Macías (Spain) A Ramos	21	21
5/8	(England) M Burgeman (England) H Fisher	8	16
(Spain) A Casquero (Spain) A Rico	21	21	21
(Germany) P Histel (Germany) M Prinz	23	14	15
(India) P Raghavan (India) V Sharma	21	21
2	(Thailand) N Chuaymak (Thailand) R Thipsotikul	17	14

Third round
(India) P Gupta (India) A Sethi	21	21
(Spain) R Macías (Spain) A Ramos	6	10
(Spain) A Casquero (Spain) A Rico	14	9
(India) P Raghavan (India) V Sharma	21	21

Quarter-finals
(India) P Gupta (India) A Sethi	15	9
(India) P Raghavan (India) V Sharma	21	21

== Women's doubles ==
=== Seeds ===
1. (France) Hélène Dijoux / Audrey Petit (bronze medalists)
2. (Denmark) Gry Uhrenholt Hermansen / Helle Kæmpegaard (gold medalists)
3. (India) Sangeetha Mari / Sandhya Melasheemi (bronze medalists)
4. (Switzerland) Ava Monney / (France) Maily Turlan (quarter-finals)

=== Finals ===
Semi-finals
1	(France) Hélène Dijoux (France) Audrey Petit	18	0^{r}
(India) Nupura Gadgil (India) Pooja Patil	21	3
3/4	(India) Sangeetha Mari (India) Sandhya Melasheemi	14	20
2	(Denmark) Gry Uhrenholt Hermansen (Denmark) Helle Kæmpegaard	21	22

Final
(India) Nupura Gadgil (India) Pooja Patil	14	12
2	(Denmark) Gry Uhrenholt Hermansen (Denmark) Helle Kæmpegaard	21	21

=== Top half ===
==== Section 1 ====
First round
(Spain) J Fernandez (Spain) C López	18	6
(Germany) N Bartsch (Germany) A Seifert	21	21

Second round
1	(France) H Dijoux (France) A Petit	21	21
(Poland) D Cygan (Poland) K Olejarz	4	8
(India) A Lotke (India) N Rani	23	11	11
(Germany) N Bartsch (Germany) A Seifert	21	21	21

Quarter-finals
1	(France) H Dijoux (France) A Petit	21	21
(Germany) N Bartsch (Germany) A Seifert	8	9

==== Section 2 ====
First round
(Spain) S del Busto (Spain) C Puebla	8	10
(India) N Gadgil (India) P Patil	21	21

Second round
3/4	(Switzerland) A Monney (France) M Turlan	29	21
(Denmark) T Blittrup (Norway) M Formo	27	17
(France) Y Le Lan (Italy) L Woravijitchaikul	8	6
(India) N Gadgil (India) P Patil	21	21

Quarter-finals
3/4	(Switzerland) A Monney (France) M Turlan	18	21	14
(India) N Gadgil (India) P Patil	21	19	21

=== Bottom half ===
==== Section 3 ====
First round
(Finland) L Ahonen (Sweden) A-M Wellendorph	14	18
(Spain) M J Mompó (Spain) S Rueda	21	21
(Spain) C M Martínez (Spain) M I Saez	12	12
(France) C Dubuisson (France) F Reynaud	21	21

Second round
(Spain) M J Mompó (Spain) S Rueda	16	13
(Germany) S Fröhlich (Germany) C Klitsch	21	21
(France) C Dubuisson (France) F Reynaud	10	11
3/4	(India) S Mari (India) S Melasheemi	21	21

Quarter-finals
(Germany) S Fröhlich (Germany) C Klitsch	11	4
3/4	(India) S Mari (India) S Melasheemi	21	21

==== Section 4 ====
First round
(Romania) A M Popa (Bulgaria) S Tarakchieva	17	21	17
(India) P Rawat (India) B Yupu	21	16	21

Second round
(India) P Rawat (India) B Yupu	21	21
(Spain) P Sanchez (Spain) V Serrano	5	8
(India) P Arege (India) C S M Bangalore
2	(Denmark) G U Hermansen (Denmark) H Kæmpegaard	w	/	o

Quarter-finals
(India) P Rawat (India) B Yupu	14	15
2	(Denmark) G U Hermansen (Denmark) H Kæmpegaard	21	21

== Mixed doubles ==
=== Seeds ===
1. (Denmark) Tommy Sørensen / Gry Uhrenholt Hermansen (gold medalists)
2. (Denmark) Niels Christian Blittrup / Tanja Blittrup (second round)
3. (England) Andrew Aspinal / Suzanne Brewer (quarter-finals)
4. (Bulgaria) Plamen Mihalev / Maya Dobreva (quarter-finals)
5. (France) Anthony Nelson / Maily Turlan (silver medalists)
6. (India) Abhinand K. Shetty / Sangeetha Mari (bronze medalists)
7. (India) Sunil Gladson Varadaraj / Radhika Ingalhalikar (quarter-finals)
8. (Denmark) Casper Lund / (Norway) Maren Formo (quarter-finals)

=== Finals ===
Semi-finals
1	(Denmark) Tommy Sørensen (Denmark) Gry Uhrenholt Hermansen	21	21
(Germany) Alois Henke (Germany) Nicole Bartsch	5	14
5/8	(France) Anthony Nelson (France) Maily Turlan	21	21	21
5/8	(India) Abhinand K. Shetty (India) Sangeetha Mari	23	18	14

Final
1	(Denmark) Tommy Sørensen (Denmark) Gry Uhrenholt Hermansen	21	23
5/8	(France) Anthony Nelson (France) Maily Turlan	14	21

=== Top half ===
==== Section 1 ====
First round
(France) V Ly (France) S Dubiez	24	17	8
(Spain) J V Martínez (Spain) I Aparicio	22	21	21

Second round
1	(Denmark) T Sørensen (Denmark) G U Hermansen	21	21
(Spain) S Latorre (Spain) C Puebla	5	8
(Sweden) M Jansson (Sweden) I Tallberg	14	19
SUB	(India) M Behal (India) G Munirathnam	21	21
5/8	(Denmark) C Lund (Norway) M Formo	21	21
(Germany) F Disic (Germany) A Seifert	8	9
(India) V Sharma (India) S Melasheemi	19	21	15
(Spain) J V Martínez (Spain) I Aparicio	21	9	21

Third round
1	(Denmark) T Sørensen (Denmark) G U Hermansen	21	21
SUB	(India) M Behal (India) G Munirathnam	3	5
5/8	(Denmark) C Lund (Norway) M Formo	21	21
(Spain) J V Martínez (Spain) I Aparicio	15	13

Quarter-finals
1	(Denmark) T Sørensen (Denmark) G U Hermansen	21	21
5/8	(Denmark) C Lund (Norway) M Formo	7	16

==== Section 2 ====
First round
(Spain) R Macías (Spain) J Fernandez	11	9
(Ukraine) M Shkliaiev (Ukraine) T Klimovych	21	21
(France) P Robas (France) Y Le Lan	15	7
(Germany) A Henke (Germany) N Bartsch	21	21

Second round
3/4	(England) A Aspinal (England) S Brewer	18	21	21
(France) J Vienne (France) F Reynaud	21	11	19
(Russia) E Shumlmeister (Russia) N Riazanova	11	20
(Ukraine) M Shkliaiev (Ukraine) T Klimovych	21	22
5/8	(India) S G Varadaraj (India) R Ingalhalikar	21	21
(Spain) Á Rodríguez (Spain) M I Saez	6	15
(Bulgaria) E Andreev (Bulgaria) S Tarakchieva	7	8
(Germany) A Henke (Germany) N Bartsch	21	21

Third round
3/4	(England) A Aspinal (England) S Brewer	7	16
(Ukraine) M Shkliaiev (Ukraine) T Klimovych	21	21
5/8	(India) S G Varadaraj (India) R Ingalhalikar	19	12
(Germany) A Henke (Germany) N Bartsch	21	21

Quarter-finals
(Ukraine) M Shkliaiev (Ukraine) T Klimovych	18	21	15
(Germany) A Henke (Germany) N Bartsch	21	16	21

=== Bottom half ===
==== Section 3 ====
First round
(England) P Troke (England) C Royall	21	21
(Spain) P Picazo (Spain) S del Busto	17	14
(France) N Sejournant (France) H Dijoux	21	21
(Germany) S Horn (Germany) P Zimmermann	17	12

Second round
(England) P Troke (England) C Royall	21	19	9
(India) P Raghavan (India) P Patil	18	21	21
(Latvia) V Bajārs (Latvia) Galviņa	7	8
5/8	(France) A Nelson (France) M Turlan	21	21
(France) N Sejournant (France) H Dijoux	21	21
(Spain) C Fernandez (Spain) C López	7	11
(England) M Burgeman (Ukraine) Na Igronova	8	12
3/4	(Bulgaria) P Mihalev (Bulgaria) M Dobreva	21	21

Third round
(India) P Raghavan (India) P Patil	17	12
5/8	(France) A Nelson (France) M Turlan	21	21
(France) N Sejournant (France) H Dijoux	21	15	20
3/4	(Bulgaria) P Mihalev (Bulgaria) M Dobreva	16	21	22

Quarter-finals
5/8	(France) A Nelson (France) M Turlan	21	21
3/4	(Bulgaria) P Mihalev (Bulgaria) M Dobreva	11	9

==== Section 4 ====
First round
(England) M Law (England) K Fairey	21	21
(France) F Cazau (France) C Dubuisson	14	18
(Spain) S López (Spain) S Rueda	16	13
(Poland) M Suski (Poland) D Cygan	21	21

Second round
(England) M Law (England) K Fairey	21	21
(Germany) E Klitsch (Germany) C Klitsch	17	13
(Spain) R del Cueto (Spain) R Osorio	11	7
5/8	(India) A K. Shetty (India) S Mari	21	21
(Poland) M Suski (Poland) D Cygan	19	17
(Estonia) M Soo (Sri Lanka) Nadeesha G	21	21
(Switzerland) O Colin (Switzerland) A Monney	20	21	21
2	(Denmark) N C Blittrup (Denmark) T Blittrup	22	16	14

Third round
(England) M Law (England) K Fairey	8	11
5/8	(India) A K. Shetty (India) S Mari	21	21
(Estonia) M Soo (Sri Lanka) Nadeesha G	11	17
(Switzerland) O Colin (Switzerland) A Monney	21	21

Quarter-finals
5/8	(India) A K. Shetty (India) S Mari	13	21	21
(Switzerland) O Colin (Switzerland) A Monney	21	15	16
