= Telma Santos =

Portuguese badminton player (born 1983)

Personal information
- Born: August 1, 1983 (age 43) Peniche, Portugal
- Height: 1.63 m (5 ft 4 in)

Sport
- Country: Portugal
- Sport: Badminton
- Handedness: Right
- Coached by: Luís Carvalho
- Highest ranking: 62 (22 September 2011)
- BWF profile
Medal record
Women's badminton
Representing Portugal
Helvetia Cup
Bronze medal – third place	2005 Agros	Mixed team
World Senior Championships
Gold medal – first place	2021 Huelva	Women's singles 35+

Telma Santos (born 1 August 1983) is a Portuguese badminton player. She competed for Portugal at the 2012 and at the 2016 Summer Olympics. Santos is the niece of Fernando Silva, a badminton player who also represented Portugal in the 1992 Summer Olympics.

In 2021, Santos won a gold medal in the women's singles 35+ category at the 2021 BWF World Senior Championships in Huelva.

== Achievements ==
=== World Senior Championships ===
Women's singles

Year	Age	Venue	Opponent	Score	Result
2021	35+	Palacio de los Deportes Carolina Marín, Huelva, Spain	(Bulgaria) Maya Dobreva	21–12, 21–7	Gold

=== BWF International Challenge/Series ===
Women's singles
Year	Tournament	Opponent	Score	Result
2007	Syria International	(Portugal) Filipa Lamy	21–16, 21–15	Winner
2007	Jordan Satellite	(Slovenia) Maja Tvrdy	15–21, 18–21	Runner-up
2008	Iran Fajr International	(Italy) Agnese Allegrini	10–21, 21–16, 19–21	Runner-up
2009	Portugal International	(England) Jill Pittard	16–21, 14–21	Runner-up
2010	Portugal International	(England) Helen Davies	21–17, 19–21, 21–12	Winner
2010	Santo Domingo Open	(Italy) Agnese Allegrini	21–11, 23–21	Winner
2011	Uganda International	(Turkey) Özge Bayrak	21–19, 19–21, 21–19	Winner
2011	Syria International	(Syria) Sanaa Mahmoud	21–14, 21–10	Winner
2011	South Africa International	(Turkey) Özge Bayrak	19–21, 10–21	Runner-up
2013	Hatzor International	(Russia) Olga Golovanova	21–16, 21–19	Winner
2013	Morocco International	(Netherlands) Gayle Mahulette	21–12, 21–10	Winner
2013	Botswana International	(South Africa) Elme de Villiers	21–4, 21–11	Winner
2013	South Africa International	(Egypt) Hadia Hosny	21–6, 21–10	Winner
2014	Colombia International	(Peru) Daniela Macías	11–5, 11–6, 11–3	Winner
2014	Hatzor International	(Croatia) Dorotea Sutara	11–6, 11–6, 11–5	Winner
2015	Guatemala International	(United States) Rong Schafer	21–12, 11–21, 10–21	Runner-up
2015	Mexico International	(Finland) Airi Mikkelä	21–15, 21–14	Winner
2015	Suriname International	(Brazil) Lohaynny Vicente	Walkover	Winner
2015	South Africa International	(Hungary) Laura Sárosi	22–20, 21–17	Winner
2016	Uganda International	(Mauritius) Kate Foo Kune	21–10, 21–12	Winner

Women's doubles
Year	Tournament	Partner	Opponent	Score	Result
2002	Italian International	(Portugal) Vânia Leça	(Austria) Verena Fastenbauer (Austria) Simone Prutsch	7–11, 3–11	Runner-up
2002	Spanish International	(Portugal) Filipa Lamy	(Sweden) Elin Bergblom (Sweden) Johanna Persson	6–8, 0–7, 4–7	Runner-up

Mixed doubles
Year	Tournament	Partner	Opponent	Score	Result
2004	Cyprus International	(Portugal) Nuno Santos	(Cyprus) Nicolas Panayiotou (Poland) Katarzyna Krasowska	12–15, 15–9, 15–4	Winner

BWF International Series tournament
BWF Future Series tournament
