= 2017 BWF World Senior Championships – 70+ =

Tournament details
- Dates: 11 September 2017 – 17 September 2017
- Edition: 9
- Level: International
- Nations: 19
- Venue: Rajiv Gandhi Indoor Stadium
- Location: Kochi, India

Champions
- Men's singles: (England) Jim Garrett
- Women's singles: (Germany) Elvira Richter
- Men's doubles: (Japan) Akira Hirota (Japan) Shinjiro Matsuda
- Women's doubles: (Japan) Sumiko Ishikawa (Japan) Satoko Nakamura
- Mixed doubles: (England) Jim Garrett (England) Susan Awcock

These are the results of 2017 BWF World Senior Championships' 70+ events which were held from 11 to 17 September 2017 at Rajiv Gandhi Indoor Stadium in Kochi, India.

== Men's singles ==
=== Seeds ===
1. (England) Jim Garrett (champion, gold medal)
2. (Japan) Yoshio Terasaki (final, silver medal)
3. (Poland) Paweł Gasz (semifinals, bronze medal)
4. (England) Roger Baldwin (quarterfinals)
5. (Malaysia) Ching Kon Kong (second round)
6. (Denmark) Knud Danielsen (third round)
7. (Japan) Akira Hirota (quarterfinals)
8. (Malaysia) Venugopal Menon (second round)

=== Finals ===
Semifinals
1	(England) Jim Garrett	21	21
3	(Poland) Paweł Gasz	16	15
(Malaysia) Foo Lai Loon	22	17	12
2	(Japan) Yoshio Terasaki	20	21	21

Final
1	(England) Jim Garrett	21	21
2	(Japan) Yoshio Terasaki	11	4

=== Top half ===
==== Section 1 ====
First Round

Second Round
1	(England) J Garrett	21	21
(Scotland) L Frame	7	9
(India) V B Arora	w	/	o
(Germany) P Honnen
8	(Malaysia) V Menon	21	13	19
(Norway) D Ask	14	21	21
(Canada) J Lauw	9	7
(Singapore) G Oon H S	21	21

Third Round
1	(England) J Garrett	21	21
(India) V B Arora	12	13
(Norway) D Ask	15	16
(Singapore) G Oon H S	21	21

Quarterfinals
1	(England) J Garrett	19	21	21
(Singapore) G Oon H S	21	15	14

==== Section 2 ====
First Round
(Denmark) J Jäger	15	17
(India) D Khonde	21	21

Second Round
3	(Poland) P Gasz	21	21
(Sri Lanka) G T Jayasuriya	6	5
(Malaysia) Leong K S	7	21	10
(Thailand) S Chintanaseri	21	16	21
7	(Japan) A Hirota	21	21
(England) J Whalebone	5	6
(Sweden) D Bengtsson	20	18
(India) D Khonde	22	21

Third Round
3	(Poland) P Gasz	17	21	21
(Thailand) S Chintanaseri	21	11	15
7	(Japan) A Hirota	21	19	21
(India) D Khonde	17	21	19

Quarterfinals
3	(Poland) P Gasz	17	21	24
7	(Japan) A Hirota	21	16	22

=== Bottom half ===
==== Section 3 ====
First Round
(Thailand) T Kornchankul	6	10
(Malaysia) Foo L L	21	21

Second Round
(Malaysia) Foo L L	21	5	21
(India) Ralliantawna	12	21	19
(Austria) G Weichlinger	5	8
6	(Denmark) K Danielsen	21	21
(Norway) K S Liland	16	19
(Poland) A Kowalski	21	21
(Germany) G Gronboldt	12	13
4	(England) R Baldwin	21	21

Third Round
(Malaysia) Foo L L	21	21
6	(Denmark) K Danielsen	17	18
(Poland) A Kowalski	12	22
4	(England) R Baldwin	21	24

Quarterfinals
(Malaysia) Foo L L	21	17	21
4	(England) R Baldwin	11	21	5

==== Section 4 ====
First Round

Second Round
(Sri Lanka) C Perera	5	9
(Republic of Ireland) R Evans	21	21
(England) R Sharp	22	21
5	(Malaysia) Ching K K	20	15
(India) A Mehta	21	23
(France) F Thomas	13	21
(Spain) F Estevez	10	9
2	(Japan) Y Terasaki	21	21

Third Round
(Republic of Ireland) R Evans	17	9
(England) R Sharp	21	21
(India) A Mehta	13	15
2	(Japan) Y Terasaki	21	21

Quarterfinals
(England) R Sharp	15	18
2	(Japan) Y Terasaki	21	21

== Women's singles ==
=== Seeds ===
1. (Germany) Elvira Richter (champion, gold medal)
2. (Japan) Satoko Nakamura (semifinals, bronze medal)

=== Group A ===
Rank	Player	Pts	Pld	W	L	SF	SA	PF	PA
1	(Japan) Sumiko Kaneko	1	1	1	0	2	0	43	32
2	(Germany) Elvira Richter	0	1	0	1	0	2	32	43

Date		Score		Set 1	Set 2	Set 3
11 Sep; 15:00	Elvira Richter (Germany)	0–2	(Japan) Sumiko Kaneko	12–21	20–22	

=== Group B ===
Rank	Player	Pts	Pld	W	L	SF	SA	PF	PA
1	(England) Mary Jenner	2	2	2	0	4	0	84	54
2	(India) Olga Dcosta	1	2	1	1	2	2	74	58
3	(Russia) Galina Valeeva	0	2	0	2	0	4	38	84

Date		Score		Set 1	Set 2	Set 3
11 Sep; 15:00	Olga Dcosta (India)	2–0	(Russia) Galina Valeeva	21–6	21–10	
12 Sep; 16:30	Mary Jenner (England)	2–0	(Russia) Galina Valeeva	21–9	21–13	
13 Sep; 12:20	Olga Dcosta (India)	0–2	(England) Mary Jenner	13–21	19–21	

=== Group C ===
Rank	Player	Pts	Pld	W	L	SF	SA	PF	PA
1	(France) Viviane Bonnay	2	2	2	0	4	1	101	46
2	(India) Gowramma Veeralinga	1	2	1	1	3	2	81	75
3	(Russia) Alla Izotova	0	2	0	2	0	4	23	84

Date		Score		Set 1	Set 2	Set 3
11 Sep; 15:00	Gowramma Veeralinga (India)	1–2	(France) Viviane Boonay	21–17	6–21	12–21
12 Sep; 16:30	Alla Izotova (Russia)	0–2	(France) Viviane Bonnay	2–21	5–21	
13 Sep; 12:20	Gowramma Veeralinga (India)	2–0	(Russia) Alla Izotova	21–5	21–11	

=== Group D ===
Rank	Player	Pts	Pld	W	L	SF	SA	PF	PA
1	(Japan) Satoko Nakamura	2	2	2	0	4	0	84	76
2	(England) Beryl Goodall	1	2	1	1	2	3	77	88
3	(India) Shaila Sardesai	0	2	0	2	1	4	74	101

Date		Score		Set 1	Set 2	Set 3
11 Sep; 15:00	Satoko Nakamura (Japan)	2–0	(England) Beryl Goodall	21–12	21–6	
12 Sep; 16:30	Shaila Sardesai (India)	1–2	(England) Beryl Goodall	18–21	21–17	7–21
13 Sep; 12:20	Satoko Nakamura (Japan)	2–0	(India) Shaila Sardesai	21–15	21–13	

=== Finals ===
Quarterfinals
A1	(Japan) Sumiko Kaneko	15
B2	(India) Olga Dcosta	4^{r}
C1	(France) Viviane Bonnay	17	21	21
D2	(England) Beryl Goodall	21	18	15
A2	(Germany) Elvira Richter	21	21
B1	(England) Mary Jenner	8	12
C1	(India) Gowramma Veeralinga	6	5
D1	(Japan) Satoko Nakamura	21	21

Semifinals
A1	(Japan) Sumiko Kaneko	21	21
C1	(France) Viviane Bonnay	19	8
A2	(Germany) Elvira Richter	14	21	21
D1	(Japan) Satoko Nakamura	21	10	13

Final
A1	(Japan) Sumiko Kaneko	15	22	10
A2	(Germany) Elvira Richter	21	20	21

== Men's doubles ==
=== Seeds ===
1. (Malaysia) Ching Kon Kong / Loo Ah Hooi (semifinals, bronze medal)
2. (England) Jim Garrett / Ray Sharp (final, silver medal)
3. (Japan) Masaki Furuhashi / Yoshio Terasaki (semifinals, bronze medal)
4. (Japan) Akira Hirota / Shinjiro Matsuda (champions, gold medal)

=== Finals ===
Semifinals
1	(Malaysia) Ching Kon Kong (Malaysia) Loo Ah Hooi	24	21	15
4	(Japan) Akira Hirota (Japan) Shinjiro Matsuda	26	17	21
3	(Japan) Masaki Furuhashi (Japan) Yoshio Terasaki	16	18
2	(England) Jim Garrett (England) Ray Sharp	21	21

Final
4	(Japan) Akira Hirota (Japan) Shinjiro Matsuda	21	21
2	(England) Jim Garrett (England) Ray Sharp	10	19

=== Top half ===
==== Section 1 ====
First Round
(Thailand) P Surakkhaka (Thailand) T Youngcharoen	21	22	17
(India) P O Alexander (India) S S Ghai	16	24	21

Second Round
1	(Malaysia) Ching K K (Malaysia) Loo A H	21	21
(Sweden) D Bengtsson (Germany) G Schonfeld	16	9
(England) R Baldwin (England) J Whalebone	21	21
(India) P O Alexander (India) S S Ghai	15	7

Quarterfinals
1	(Malaysia) Ching K K (Malaysia) Loo A H	13	21	21
(England) R Baldwin (England) J Whalebone	21	10	8

==== Section 2 ====
First Round
(England) D Brinsden (England) A Perera	21	15	20
(Poland) P Gasz (Poland) A Kowalski	14	21	22

Second Round
4	(Japan) A Hirota (Japan) S Matsuda	21	21
(India) R Gungeti (India) G R Pulluri	8	6
(Scotland) L Frame (Canada) J Lauw	10	12
(Poland) P Gasz (Poland) A Kowalski	21	21

Quarterfinals
4	(Japan) A Hirota (Japan) S Matsuda	21	21
(Poland) P Gasz (Poland) A Kowalski	12	11

=== Bottom half ===
==== Section 3 ====
First Round
(India) A C Motilal (India) B Thakore	13	15
(Denmark) K Danielsen (Germany) G Gronboldt	21	21

Second Round
(Denmark) K Danielsen (Germany) G Gronboldt	21	21
(Norway) D Ask (Norway) K S Liland	10	19
(Denmark) L Gyldenohr (Denmark) J Jäger	10	11
3	(Japan) M Furuhashi (Japan) Y Terasaki	21	21

Quarterfinals
(Denmark) K Danielsen (Germany) G Gronboldt	13	10
3	(Japan) M Furuhashi (Japan) Y Terasaki	21	21

==== Section 4 ====
First Round
(Sri Lanka) G T Jayasuriya (Sri Lanka) C Perera	7	11
(Malaysia) Foo L L (Malaysia) Leong K S	21	21

Second Round
(Malaysia) Foo L L (Malaysia) Leong K S	21	21
(India) V B Arora (India) A A Patodi	19	12
(Thailand) S Chintanaseri (Thailand) T Kornchankul	17	12
2	(England) J Garrett (England) R Sharp	21	21

Quarterfinals
(Malaysia) Foo L L (Malaysia) Leong K S	18	19
2	(England) J Garrett (England) R Sharp	21	21

== Women's doubles ==
=== Seeds ===
1. (England) Beryl Goodall / Mary Jenner (final, silver medal)
2. (England) Susan Awcock / Victoria Betts (semifinals, bronze medal)

=== Group A ===
Rank	Player	Pts	Pld	W	L	SF	SA	PF	PA
1	(England) Beryl Goodall (England) Mary Jenner	2	2	2	0	4	0	84	30
2	(Germany) Elvira Richter (Germany) Elisabeth Schonfeld	1	1	1	1	2	2	64	65
3	(Russia) Alla Izotova (Russia) Galina Valeeva	0	2	0	2	0	4	31	84

Date		Score		Set 1	Set 2	Set 3
11 Sep; 12:00	Beryl Goodall (England); Mary Jenner (England)	2–0	(Russia) Alla Izotova (Russia) Galina Valeeva	21–6	21–2	
12 Sep; 10:00	Elvira Richter (Germany); Elisabeth Schonfeld (Germany)	2–0	(Russia) Alla Izotova (Russia) Galina Valeeva	21–12	21–11	
13 Sep; 17:20	Beryl Goodall (England); Mary Jenner (England)	2–0	(Germany) Elvira Richter (Germany) Elisabeth Schonfeld	21–11	21–11	

=== Group B ===
Rank	Player	Pts	Pld	W	L	SF	SA	PF	PA
1	(Japan) Suiko Ishikawa (Japan) Satoko Nakamura	2	2	2	0	4	0	84	38
2	(England) Susan Awcock (England) Victoria Betts	1	2	1	1	2	2	62	59
3	(Sweden) Lisbeth Bengtsson (Denmark) Margrethe Danielsen	0	2	0	2	0	4	35	84

Date		Score		Set 1	Set 2	Set 3
11 Sep; 10:30	Susan Awcock (England); Victoria Betts (England)	2–0	(Sweden) Lisbeth Bengtsson (Denmark) Margrethe Danielsen	21–6	21–11	
12 Sep; 10:00	Sumiko Ishikawa (Japan); Satoko Nakamura (Japan)	2–0	(Sweden) Lisbeth Bengtsson (Denmark) Margrethe Danielsen	21–7	21–11	
13 Sep; 17:20	Susan Awcock (England); Victoria Bett (England)	0–2	(Japan) Sumiko Ishikawa (Japan) Satoko Nakamura	8–21	12–21	

=== Finals ===
Semifinals
A1	(England) Beryl Goodall (England) Mary Jenner	21	19	21
B2	(England) Susan Awcock (England) Victoria Betts	16	21	16
A2	(Germany) Elvira Richter (Germany) Elisabeth Schonfeld	11	11
B1	(Japan) Suiko Ishikawa (Japan) Satoko Nakamura	21	21

Final
A1	(England) Beryl Goodall (England) Mary Jenner	10	21	23
B1	(Japan) Suiko Ishikawa (Japan) Satoko Nakamura	21	19	25

== Mixed doubles ==
=== Seeds ===
1. (England) Roger Baldwin / Victoria Betts (semifinals, bronze medal)
2. (England) Jim Garrett / Susan Awcock (champions, gold medal)
3. (Denmark) Knud Danielsen / Margrethe Danielsen (semifinals, bronze medal)
4. (England) John Whalebone / Beryl Goodall (quarterfinals)

=== Finals ===
Semifinals
1	(England) Roger Baldwin (England) Victoria Betts	17	18
(Japan) Masaki Furuhashi (Japan) Sumiko Kaneko	21	21
3	(Denmark) Knud Danielsen (Denmark) Margrethe Danielsen	19	21	16
2	(England) Jim Garrett (England) Susan Awcock	21	6	21

Final
(Japan) Masaki Furuhashi (Japan) Sumiko Kaneko	20	15
2	(England) Jim Garrett (England) Susan Awcock	22	21

=== Top half ===
==== Section 1 ====
First Round	Second Round					Quarterfinals
	1	(England) R Baldwin (England) V Betts	21	19	21
		(India) V B Arora (India) S Sardesai	14	21	14
						1	(England) R Baldwin (England) V Betts	21	21
							(Denmark) J Jäger (Denmark) G Steenberg	18	8
	(Denmark) J Jäger (Denmark) G Steenberg		21	21
	(Sweden) D Bengtsson (Russia) A Izotova		9	12

==== Section 2 ====
First Round
(Denmark) O Gyldenohr (Russia) G Valeeva	21	21
(India) D P Thombre (India) G Veeralinga	15	19

Second Round
4	(England) J Whalebone (England) B Goodall	21	21
(Germany) G Schonfeld (Germany) E Schonfeld	10	11
(Japan) M Furuhashi (Japan) S Kaneko	21	21
(Denmark) O Gyldenohr (Russia) G Valeeva	6	6

Quarterfinals
4	(England) J Whalebone (England) B Goodall	11	9
(Japan) M Furuhashi (Japan) S Kaneko	21	21

=== Bottom half ===
==== Section 3 ====
First Round
(England) R Sharp (England) M Jenner	15	15
(Thailand) S Chintanaseri (Thailand) D Vajrathon	21	21

Second Round
(Thailand) S Chintanaseri (Thailand) D Vajrathon	23	21
(Japan) S Hida (Japan) S Ishikawa	21	13
(Norway) K S Liland (Sweden) L Bengtsson	15	11
3	(Denmark) K Danielsen (Denmark) M Danielsen	21	21

Quarterfinals
(Thailand) S Chintanaseri (Thailand) D Vajrathon	15	21	15
3	(Denmark) K Danielsen (Denmark) M Danielsen	21	17	21

==== Section 4 ====
First Round	Second Round					Quarterfinals
	(Japan) S Matsuda (Japan) S Nakamura		21	18	23
	(Germany) P Honnen (Germany) E Richter		16	21	21
							(Japan) S Matsuda (Japan) S Nakamura	10	16
						2	(England) J Garrett (England) S Awcock	21	21
		(India) Ralliantawna (India) O Dcosta	10	9
	2	(England) J Garrett (England) S Awcock	21	21

== Sources ==
- Men's singles
  - Results
- Women's singles
  - Group A Results
  - Group B Results
  - Group C Results
  - Group D Results
  - Finals Results
- Men's doubles
  - Results
- Women's doubles
  - Group A Results
  - Group B Results
  - Finals Results
- Mixed doubles
  - Results
