= 2021 BWF World Senior Championships =

2021 Badminton tournament in Spain

Tournament details
- Dates: 28 November – 4 December
- Edition: 10th
- Level: International
- Competitors: 1071 from 45 nations
- Venue: Palacio de los Deportes Carolina Marín
- Location: Huelva, Spain

The 2021 BWF World Senior Championships (officially known as the ElPozo BWF World Senior Championships 2021 for sponsorship reasons) is a badminton tournament which held from 28 November to 4 December 2021 at Palacio de los Deportes Carolina Marín in Huelva, Spain.

== Participants ==
| Conf. | Nation | 35+ | | | | | 40+ | | | | | 45+ | | | | | 50+ | | | | | 55+ | | | | | 60+ | | | | | 65+ | | | | | 70+ | | | | | 75+ | | | | Entries | Players |
| Conf. | Nation | MS | WS | MD | WD | XD | MS | WS | MD | WD | XD | MS | WS | MD | WD | XD | MS | WS | MD | WD | XD | MS | WS | MD | WD | XD | MS | WS | MD | WD | XD | MS | WS | MD | WD | XD | MS | WS | MD | WD | XD | MS | WS | MD | XD | Entries | Players |
|---|---|---|---|---|---|---|---|---|---|---|---|---|---|---|---|---|---|---|---|---|---|---|---|---|---|---|---|---|---|---|---|---|---|---|---|---|---|---|---|---|---|---|---|---|---|---|---|
| Africa | South Africa | | | | | | | | | | | | | | | | | | | | | | | 1 | | 0.5 | 1 | | 0.5 | | | | | | | | 1 | | 0.5 | | 0.5 | | | | | 5 | 5 |
| Asia | Chinese Taipei | 4 | | 1.5 | | | | | | | | | | | | | 1 | | | | | 1 | | 0.5 | | | 1 | | 0.5 | | | 1 | | | | | | | | | | | | | | 12.5 | 10 |
| Asia | Hong Kong | | | | | | | | | | | 1 | | 1 | | | | | | | | | 1 | | 0.5 | 0.5 | | | | | | | | | | | | | | | | | | | | 2 | 1 |
| Asia | India | 6 | 4 | 8 | 5 | 5 | 4 | 5 | 7 | 4 | 7 | 8 | 6 | 6 | 5 | 6 | 5 | 4 | 6 | 4 | 3 | 3 | 7 | 6 | 5 | 5 | 4 | 5 | 5 | 2 | 5 | 4 | | 3 | | | 2 | | 1 | | | 4 | 1 | 1 | | 171 | 192 |
| Asia | Indonesia | | | | | | 1 | | | | | | | | | | 1 | | 1 | | 0.5 | | | | | | 1 | | 0.5 | | 0.5 | | | 0.5 | | 0.5 | | | | | | | | | | 6.5 | 5 |
| Asia | Israel | 1 | | | | | | | | | | | | | | | | | | | | | | | | | | 1 | | | | | | | | | | | | | | | | | | 2 | 2 |
| Asia | Malaysia | | | | | | | | | | | | | | | | | | | | | 1 | | | | | | | 0.5 | | | 2 | | 1 | | | | | 1 | | | | | | | 5.5 | 6 |
| Asia | Mongolia | 2 | | 1 | | | | | | | | | | | | | | | | | | | | | | | | | | | | | | | | | | | | | | | | | | 3 | 2 |
| Asia | South Korea | | | | | | | | | 1 | | | | | | | 1 | | 4 | 1 | 1.5 | | | | | | | | | | | | | | | | | | | | | | | | | 8.5 | 13 |
| Asia | Sri Lanka | | 1 | | | 0.5 | 3 | | 2 | | 0.5 | 7 | | 4 | | | 2 | | | | | 3 | | 1.5 | | | | 1 | | | 0.5 | | | 0.5 | | 0.5 | 1 | | | | | | | | | 28 | 21 |
| Asia | Thailand | 1 | | 2 | | | 1 | | | | | | | | | | | | 0.5 | 0.5 | 1 | 2 | | 2 | | | 1 | | 0.5 | | | | | | | | 1 | | 1 | | | 1 | | 0.5 | | 15 | 14 |
| Europe | Austria | | | | | | | | | | | 4 | 1 | 2.5 | 0.5 | 1.5 | 1 | | | | | | | | | | | | | | | 2 | | 1 | | | | | | | | | | | | 13.5 | 8 |
| Europe | Belgium | | | 0.5 | | | | | | | | 2 | | | | | 1 | 2 | 1 | 1.5 | 1.5 | 2 | 1 | 0.5 | | 1 | 2 | | 1 | | | | | 0.5 | | | | 1 | | | 0.5 | | | | | 19 | 12 |
| Europe | Bulgaria | | 1 | | 0.5 | 2 | 1 | | 2 | | | | 1 | | 0.5 | 0.5 | | | | | | | | | | | | | | | | | | | | | | | | | | | | | | 8.5 | 7 |
| Europe | Croatia | | | | | | | | | | | | | | | | 1 | | 0.5 | | | | | | | | | | | | | | | | | | | | | | | | | | | 1.5 | 1 |
| Europe | Czech Republic | | | | | | 2 | | 2 | | 0.5 | 2 | | | | | | | | | | 2 | | 1.5 | | | 1 | | 0.5 | | | 1 | | | | | | | | | | | | | | 12.5 | 8 |
| Europe | Denmark | | | 1 | 1.5 | 2.5 | 2 | 2 | 2 | 0.5 | 2.5 | 6 | 4 | 3 | 3.5 | 5 | 4 | | 4.5 | 1.5 | 4 | 3 | | 2.5 | 0.5 | 2.5 | 6 | | 5.5 | 0.5 | 1 | 3 | | 1 | | 1.5 | 4 | 3 | 2.5 | 1.5 | 3.5 | 2 | | 0.5 | 0.5 | 94 | 67 |
| Europe | England | 4 | | 2 | | 3.5 | 5 | | 4 | 2.5 | 4 | 3 | 1 | 2 | 3 | 5 | 5 | 3 | 4.5 | 4 | 5.5 | 7 | 3 | 5 | 1 | 4 | 4 | 4 | 2 | 3.5 | 4.5 | 4 | 4 | 2.5 | 3 | 5.5 | 3 | | 3.5 | 3 | 4 | 3 | 1 | 1.5 | 2 | 137.5 | 97 |
| Europe | Estonia | 1 | | 0.5 | | 0.5 | | 2 | | 1 | 1 | 1 | | 2 | 2 | 3 | 2 | | 1 | 1 | 2 | | | | | 0.5 | | | | | | | | | | | | | | | | | | | | 20.5 | 15 |
| Europe | Finland | | 1 | | 0.5 | | 2 | 1 | 1 | 1 | 1.5 | 1 | | | | | 2 | 1 | 3 | | 2 | 2 | 2 | | 1 | 1 | 1 | | | | | | | | | | 1 | | 0.5 | | | | | | | 25.5 | 19 |
| Europe | France | 6 | 4 | 4.5 | 3 | 6 | 8 | 3 | 4.5 | 1.5 | 3.5 | 4 | 4 | 3 | 2.5 | 5 | 5 | 3 | 5 | 2.5 | 6 | 4 | 4 | 2 | 2 | 2 | 7 | 2 | 4 | 2 | 3 | 4 | 1 | 1.5 | | 1 | 2 | 1 | 1 | | | 1 | | 0.5 | | 129 | 88 |
| Europe | Germany | 7 | 4 | 5.5 | 2 | 4 | 8 | 4 | 2 | 3.5 | 6.5 | 8 | 4 | 5 | 2.5 | 6.5 | 5 | 4 | 4.5 | 5 | 5.5 | 7 | 4 | 2.5 | 2 | 4.5 | 8 | 4 | 5 | 2.5 | 6.5 | 8 | | 3 | | | 3 | 1 | 1.5 | | 1 | 3 | 1 | 1 | 1 | 166 | 104 |
| Europe | Greece | | | | | | | | | | | | | | | | | 1 | | | | | | | | | | | | | | | | | | | | | | | | | | | | 1 | 1 |
| Europe | Iceland | | | | | | 1 | | | 1 | 1 | | 1 | 0.5 | | | 1 | | | | | | | | | | 1 | | | | | | | | | | | | | | | | | | | 6.5 | 5 |
| Europe | Ireland | | | | | | | | | | | | | | | | | | | | | 1 | 1 | 1 | 1 | 1.5 | | | 0.5 | | | 1 | | | | | | | | | | | | | | 7 | 5 |
| Europe | Italy | | 1 | | 0.5 | | 1 | | 1 | | | | | | | 1 | 1 | 2 | | 1 | 2 | 2 | | 1 | | 1 | 3 | | 1 | | | | | | | | | | | | | | | | | 18.5 | 13 |
| Europe | Latvia | 2 | | 1 | | 1 | 3 | 1 | 1 | 0.5 | | | | | 0.5 | | | | | | | 1 | | 0.5 | | 1 | | | | | | | | | | | | | | | | | | | | 12.5 | 8 |
| Europe | Lithuania | | | | | | | | | | | 1 | | 0.5 | | 1 | 3 | | 2 | | | | | | | 0.5 | | | | | | | | | | | | | | | | | | | | 8 | 6 |
| Europe | Luxembourg | | | | | | | | | | | 1 | | | | | | | | | | | | | | | | 1 | | | 0.5 | | | | | | | | | | | | | | | 2.5 | 2 |
| Europe | Netherlands | | | 0.5 | | | 1 | 1 | | 0.5 | 1.5 | 4 | 1 | 2.5 | 1 | 3.5 | 1 | 2 | | 1.5 | 1 | | 2 | | 0.5 | 1.5 | 1 | 1 | 0.5 | 0.5 | 1 | | | 0.5 | 0.5 | 1 | | | 0.5 | | | 1 | | | | 33.5 | 20 |
| Europe | Norway | | 1 | | 0.5 | 0.5 | | 1 | | 0.5 | 1 | 1 | 1 | 1 | 1 | 1.5 | 4 | | 1 | 0.5 | 0.5 | 3 | 1 | 1.5 | | 1 | 1 | | | | | 1 | | 0.5 | | | | | | | | 1 | | 0.5 | 0.5 | 27 | 16 |
| Europe | Poland | 1 | 1 | 1.5 | 1 | 1 | 4 | 2 | 1 | 1 | 2 | 1 | | 1 | | | 1 | 2 | | 1 | 1 | | | | | | | | | | | | | 0.5 | | | | | | | | 2 | | 1 | | 26 | 16 |
| Europe | Portugal | 2 | 1 | 1 | | | 2 | | 0.5 | | | 2 | | 0.5 | | 1 | 2 | 1 | 2 | | | 5 | | 2 | | | | | | | | 1 | | | | | | | | | | | | | | 23 | 16 |
| Europe | Romania | | | | 0.5 | | | | | | | | 1 | | | 0.5 | | | | | | | | | | | | | | | | | | | | | | | | | | | | | | 2 | 1 |
| Europe | Russia | 1 | 1 | | | 1 | | | | | | 3 | | 1.5 | | 1 | 1 | | 1 | | | 2 | | 1 | | | 1 | | | | | 2 | | 1 | | | | | | | | | | | | 17.5 | 13 |
| Europe | Scotland | | | | | | | | | | | 2 | | 1.5 | 0.5 | 2 | | | 0.5 | | | | | | | | 2 | | 1 | 0.5 | 2 | | 1 | | 0.5 | | | | | | | | | | | 13.5 | 9 |
| Europe | Slovakia | | | | | | | | | | | | | | | | 1 | | | | | | | | | | | | | | | | | | | | | | | | | | | | | 1 | 1 |
| Europe | Spain (H) | 8 | 4 | 8 | 5 | 8 | 8 | 6 | 7 | 3 | 8 | 7 | 8 | 7 | 3 | 8 | 8 | 6 | 5 | 6 | 6.5 | 4 | 3 | 2 | | 2 | 3 | 1 | 3 | 3 | 2.5 | 4 | 1 | 2 | | 1 | 2 | 1 | 1 | | 1 | 1 | | | | 167 | 125 |
| Europe | Sweden | 1 | | | 0.5 | 1 | 4 | 4 | 2 | 3.5 | 4 | 6 | 2 | 3 | 0.5 | 4 | 7 | 3 | 3.5 | 1 | 3.5 | 6 | | 3 | 0.5 | 1.5 | 6 | 1 | 3.5 | 2 | 4.5 | 4 | | 2 | | 1 | 1 | 3 | 1 | 1.5 | 2 | 2 | | 0.5 | 0.5 | 100 | 61 |
| Europe | Switzerland | 1 | | | 0.5 | 1 | 5 | 1 | 1 | | 2 | 2 | 2 | 1.5 | 2 | 0.5 | 3 | 4 | 1 | 1 | 4 | 5 | 2 | 2.5 | 1 | 1.5 | 1 | 3 | 0.5 | 1.5 | 1.5 | | | 1 | | | 1 | | | | | | | | | 56.5 | 34 |
| Europe | Ukraine | 1 | 1 | | | 1.5 | 1 | 1 | | 1 | 2.5 | 3 | | 1 | | | | | | | | | | | | | | | | | | | | | | | | | | | | | | | | 13 | 10 |
| Oceania | Australia | | | | | | | | | | | | | | | | | | | | | | | | | | | | | | | | | | | | 1 | | | | | | | | | 1 | 1 |
| Pan Am | Canada | | | | | | | | | | | | | | | | | | | | | 1 | | 0.5 | | | 2 | | 1 | | | | | | | | | | | | | 1 | | | | 5.5 | 4 |
| Pan Am | Peru | | | | | | | | | | | | | | | | 1 | | 0.5 | | | | | | | | | | | | | | | | | | | | | | | | | | 0.5 | 2 | 2 |
| Pan Am | United States | | | | | | | | | | | | | 1 | | | | | | | | 1 | | | | | 1 | | 0.5 | | | | | | | | | 1 | | | 0.5 | | | | | 5 | 5 |
| Total (45 NOCs) | | 49 | 26 | 40 | 21 | 39 | 67 | 34 | 40 | 26 | 49 | 80 | 37 | 51 | 28 | 55 | 70 | 38 | 52 | 33 | 51 | 68 | 31 | 40 | 15 | 33 | 59 | 24 | 37 | 18 | 33 | 42 | 7 | 22 | 4 | 12 | 23 | 11 | 15 | 6 | 13 | 22 | 3 | 7 | 5 | 1436 | 1071 |

== Medal summary ==
=== Medal table ===
* Host nation (Spain)

2021 BWF World Senior Championships medal table
| Rank | Nation | Gold | Silver | Bronze | Total |
|---|---|---|---|---|---|
| 1 | Denmark | 9.5 | 6.5 | 12 | 28 |
| 2 | England | 8.5 | 12 | 14 | 34.5 |
| 3 | Netherlands | 4.5 | 2.5 | 1 | 8 |
| 4 | Thailand | 3 | 0.5 | 4 | 7.5 |
| 5 | Chinese Taipei | 2 | 2 | 1 | 5 |
| 6 | Russia | 2 | 0 | 2 | 4 |
| 7 | Sweden | 1.5 | 4.5 | 12.5 | 18.5 |
| 8 | Iceland | 1.5 | 0 | 1 | 2.5 |
| 9 | South Africa | 1.5 | 0 | 0 | 1.5 |
| 10 | India | 1 | 3 | 8 | 12 |
| 11 | Germany | 1 | 2 | 8.5 | 11.5 |
| 12 | France | 1 | 2 | 5 | 8 |
| 13 | South Korea | 1 | 1 | 0 | 2 |
| 14 | Switzerland | 1 | 0 | 2 | 3 |
| 15 | Portugal | 1 | 0 | 1 | 2 |
| 16 | Hong Kong | 1 | 0 | 0.5 | 1.5 |
| 17 | Israel | 1 | 0 | 0 | 1 |
| 18 | Scotland | 0.5 | 2.5 | 2 | 5 |
| 19 | Canada | 0.5 | 1 | 0 | 1.5 |
| 20 | Finland | 0.5 | 0 | 3 | 3.5 |
| 21 | United States | 0.5 | 0 | 0 | 0.5 |
| 22 | Poland | 0 | 1 | 4 | 5 |
| 23 | Bulgaria | 0 | 1 | 1 | 2 |
| 24 | Ireland | 0 | 1 | 0 | 1 |
| 25 | Norway | 0 | 0.5 | 0.5 | 1 |
| 26 | Austria | 0 | 0.5 | 0 | 0.5 |
| 26 | Croatia | 0 | 0.5 | 0 | 0.5 |
| 28 | Czech Republic | 0 | 0 | 1 | 1 |
| 28 | Malaysia | 0 | 0 | 1 | 1 |
| 28 | Spain* | 0 | 0 | 1 | 1 |
| Totals (30 entries) | | 44 | 44 | 86 | 174 |

=== Medalists ===
| Event | Gold | Silver | Bronze |
35+
| Men's singles | (France) Anthony Nelson | (Chinese Taipei) Hsueh Hsuan-yi | (India) Manish Rawat |
| Men's singles | (France) Anthony Nelson | (Chinese Taipei) Hsueh Hsuan-yi | (Thailand) Boonsak Ponsana |
| Women's singles | (Portugal) Telma Santos | (Bulgaria) Maya Dobreva | (France) Audrey Petit |
| Women's singles | (Portugal) Telma Santos | (Bulgaria) Maya Dobreva | (Germany) Nicole Bartsch |
| Men's doubles | (Thailand) Boonsak Ponsana (Thailand) Jakrapan Thanathiratham | (India) Padmanabha Raghavan (India) Varun Sharma | (France) Bruno Cazau (France) Anthony Nelson |
| Men's doubles | (Thailand) Boonsak Ponsana (Thailand) Jakrapan Thanathiratham | (India) Padmanabha Raghavan (India) Varun Sharma | (Chinese Taipei) Chao Chun-ken (Chinese Taipei) Tsai Ming-hsin |
| Women's doubles | (Denmark) Gry Uhrenholt Hermansen (Denmark) Helle Kæmpegaard | (India) Nupura Gadgil (India) Pooja Patil | (France) Hélène Dijoux (France) Audrey Petit |
| Women's doubles | (Denmark) Gry Uhrenholt Hermansen (Denmark) Helle Kæmpegaard | (India) Nupura Gadgil (India) Pooja Patil | (India) Sangeetha Mari (India) Sandhya Melasheemi |
| Mixed doubles | (Denmark) Tommy Sørensen (Denmark) Gry Uhrenholt Hermansen | (France) Anthony Nelson (France) Maily Turlan | (Germany) Alois Henke (Germany) Nicole Bartsch |
| Mixed doubles | (Denmark) Tommy Sørensen (Denmark) Gry Uhrenholt Hermansen | (France) Anthony Nelson (France) Maily Turlan | (India) Abhinand K. Shetty (India) Sangeetha Mari |
40+
| Men's singles | (Denmark) Casper Lund | (England) Alex Marritt | (Thailand) Naruenart Chuaymak |
| Men's singles | (Denmark) Casper Lund | (England) Alex Marritt | (Bulgaria) Tihomir Kirov |
| Women's singles | (Germany) Claudia Vogelgsang | (France) Stephanie Cloarec | (Poland) Dominika Guzik-Płuchowska |
| Women's singles | (Germany) Claudia Vogelgsang | (France) Stephanie Cloarec | (Germany) Stefanie Schmidt |
| Men's doubles | (Denmark) Tommy Sørensen (Denmark) Jesper Thomsen | (India) J. B. S. Vidyadhar (India) Ajit B. Umrani | (India) Samir Abbasi (India) Upendra Fadnis |
| Men's doubles | (Denmark) Tommy Sørensen (Denmark) Jesper Thomsen | (India) J. B. S. Vidyadhar (India) Ajit B. Umrani | (India) Abhinand K. Shetty (India) Sunil Gladson Varadaraj |
| Women's doubles | (Iceland) Drífa Harðardóttir (Iceland) Elsa Nielsen | (South Korea) An Dong-soon (South Korea) Lim Eun-sil | (England) Mhairi Armstrong (England) Suzanne Brewer |
| Women's doubles | (Iceland) Drífa Harðardóttir (Iceland) Elsa Nielsen | (South Korea) An Dong-soon (South Korea) Lim Eun-sil | (Germany) Claudia Vogelgsang (Sweden) Katja Wengberg |
| Mixed doubles | (Denmark) Jesper Thomsen (Iceland) Drífa Harðardóttir | (England) Alex Marritt (England) Rebecca Pantaney | (Denmark) Morten Eilby Rasmussen (Germany) Claudia Vogelgsang |
| Mixed doubles | (Denmark) Jesper Thomsen (Iceland) Drífa Harðardóttir | (England) Alex Marritt (England) Rebecca Pantaney | (England) Mark Constable (England) Lynne Swan |
45+
| Men's singles | (Denmark) Gregers Schytt | (Sweden) Ulf Svenson | (Spain) Abel Hernández |
| Men's singles | (Denmark) Gregers Schytt | (Sweden) Ulf Svenson | (Scotland) Mark Mackay |
| Women's singles | (Netherlands) Georgy van Soerland-Trouerbach | (England) Rebecca Pantaney | (Denmark) Majken Asmussen |
| Women's singles | (Netherlands) Georgy van Soerland-Trouerbach | (England) Rebecca Pantaney | (Denmark) Janne Vang Nielsen |
| Men's doubles | (India) K. A. Aneesh (India) Vijay Lancy Mascarenhas | (Denmark) Johnny Hast Hansen (Scotland) Mark Mackay | (Sweden) Mikael Nilsson (Sweden) Ulf Svenson |
| Men's doubles | (India) K. A. Aneesh (India) Vijay Lancy Mascarenhas | (Denmark) Johnny Hast Hansen (Scotland) Mark Mackay | (Netherlands) Gerben Bruijstens (Netherlands) Stan de Lange |
| Women's doubles | (Netherlands) Marielle van der Woerdt (Netherlands) Georgy van Soerland-Trouerbach | (Denmark) Janne Vang Nielsen (Denmark) Birgitte Pedersen | (England) Rebecca Pantaney (England) Lynne Swan |
| Women's doubles | (Netherlands) Marielle van der Woerdt (Netherlands) Georgy van Soerland-Trouerbach | (Denmark) Janne Vang Nielsen (Denmark) Birgitte Pedersen | (Denmark) Majken Asmussen (Scotland) Lynne Campell |
| Mixed doubles | (Netherlands) Gerben Bruijstens (Netherlands) Georgy van Soerland-Trouerbach | (Denmark) Morten Aarup (Denmark) Lene Struwe Andersen | (Portugal) Fernando Silva (Portugal) Maria Gomes |
| Mixed doubles | (Netherlands) Gerben Bruijstens (Netherlands) Georgy van Soerland-Trouerbach | (Denmark) Morten Aarup (Denmark) Lene Struwe Andersen | (Denmark) Anders Steenkjær (Denmark) Janne Vang Nielsen |
50+
| Men's singles | (Chinese Taipei) Wu Chang-jun | (Sweden) Stefan Grahn | (India) Vijay Sharma |
| Men's singles | (Chinese Taipei) Wu Chang-jun | (Sweden) Stefan Grahn | (Finland) Tarmo Martikainen |
| Women's singles | (England) Caroline Hale | (England) Betty Blair | (Poland) Dorota Grzejdak |
| Women's singles | (England) Caroline Hale | (England) Betty Blair | (Germany) Tanja Eberl |
| Men's doubles | (Russia) Oleg Grigoryev (Russia) Vadim Nazarov | (Denmark) Jens Eriksen (Croatia) Sandi Saban | (Switzerland) Philipp Kurz (Switzerland) Rémy Matthey de l’Etang |
| Men's doubles | (Russia) Oleg Grigoryev (Russia) Vadim Nazarov | (Denmark) Jens Eriksen (Croatia) Sandi Saban | (Finland) Jari Eriksson (Finland) Mika Eriksson |
| Women's doubles | (South Korea) Chung Gil-soon (South Korea) Chung So-young | (England) Elizabeth Austin (England) Caroline Hale | (Poland) Dorota Grzejdak (Poland) Ewa Mlynarska |
| Women's doubles | (South Korea) Chung Gil-soon (South Korea) Chung So-young | (England) Elizabeth Austin (England) Caroline Hale | (England) Betty Blair (England) June Hammond |
| Mixed doubles | (Switzerland) Rémy Matthey de l'Etang (Switzerland) Anke Treu | (England) Simon Gilhooly (England) Sara Foster | (England) Justin G. Andrews (England) Tracy Hutchinson |
| Mixed doubles | (Switzerland) Rémy Matthey de l'Etang (Switzerland) Anke Treu | (England) Simon Gilhooly (England) Sara Foster | (Denmark) Brian Tim Juul Jensen (Denmark) Anja G. Thomsen |
55+
| Men's singles | (Thailand) Karun Kasayapanant | (Chinese Taipei) Chou Tsai-shen | (France) Jean-Jacques Bontemps |
| Men's singles | (Thailand) Karun Kasayapanant | (Chinese Taipei) Chou Tsai-shen | (Sweden) Magnus Nytell |
| Women's singles | (Hong Kong) Zhou Xin | (England) Cathy Bargh | (England) June Hammond |
| Women's singles | (Hong Kong) Zhou Xin | (England) Cathy Bargh | (England) Debora Miller |
| Men's doubles | (Thailand) Karun Kasayapanant (Thailand) Surachai Makkasasithorn | (Germany) Klaus Buschbeck (Germany) Jürgen Schmitz-Foster | (Denmark) Morten Christensen (Denmark) Jan Bertram Petersen |
| Men's doubles | (Thailand) Karun Kasayapanant (Thailand) Surachai Makkasasithorn | (Germany) Klaus Buschbeck (Germany) Jürgen Schmitz-Foster | (Sweden) Magnus Nytell (Sweden) Erik Soderberg |
| Women's doubles | (England) Cathy Bargh (England) Debora Miller | (Republic of Ireland) Pamela Peard (Republic of Ireland) Sian Williams | (Sweden) Anki Gunners (Hong Kong) Zhou Xin |
| Women's doubles | (England) Cathy Bargh (England) Debora Miller | (Republic of Ireland) Pamela Peard (Republic of Ireland) Sian Williams | (Finland) Terhi Luola (Finland) Paula Petäys |
| Mixed doubles | (Sweden) Magnus Nytell (Netherlands) Sandra Kroon | (Sweden) Erik Soderberg (Sweden) Anki Gunners | (India) Prabhu Naik Naidu Kona (India) Suzanne Venglet |
| Mixed doubles | (Sweden) Magnus Nytell (Netherlands) Sandra Kroon | (Sweden) Erik Soderberg (Sweden) Anki Gunners | (Denmark) Morten Christensen (Denmark) Hanne Bertelsen |
60+
| Men's singles | (Chinese Taipei) Chang Wen-sung | (Canada) Jack Keith Priestman | (Czech Republic) Leoš Sedlák |
| Men's singles | (Chinese Taipei) Chang Wen-sung | (Canada) Jack Keith Priestman | (Iceland) Broddi Kristjánsson |
| Women's singles | (Israel) Svetlana Zilberman | (Netherlands) Maureen Oskam | (Switzerland) Silva Lüthi Tripet |
| Women's singles | (Israel) Svetlana Zilberman | (Netherlands) Maureen Oskam | (Germany) Heidi Bender |
| Men's doubles | (Canada) Jack Keith Priestman (United States) Geoffrey Stensland | (Denmark) Jørgen Jepsen (Denmark) Lars Kruse | (Denmark) Jesper Helledie (Scotland) Dan Travers |
| Men's doubles | (Canada) Jack Keith Priestman (United States) Geoffrey Stensland | (Denmark) Jørgen Jepsen (Denmark) Lars Kruse | (Sweden) Magnus Ericsson (Sweden) Bengt Mellquist |
| Women's doubles | (England) Launa Eyles (England) Kerry Mullen | (Sweden) Sonja Hermann (Netherlands) Maureen Oskam | (Denmark) Birte Bach Steffensen (Germany) Heidi Bender |
| Women's doubles | (England) Launa Eyles (England) Kerry Mullen | (Sweden) Sonja Hermann (Netherlands) Maureen Oskam | (England) Reggie Baker (England) Andi Stretch |
| Mixed doubles | (Sweden) Magnus Ericsson (Sweden) Kerstin Kristoffersson | (Scotland) Dan Travers (Scotland) Christine Black | (Sweden) Per Areskär (Sweden) Jeanette Sandstrom |
| Mixed doubles | (Sweden) Magnus Ericsson (Sweden) Kerstin Kristoffersson | (Scotland) Dan Travers (Scotland) Christine Black | (Sweden) Bengt Mellquist (England) Kerry Mullen |
65+
| Men's singles | (Denmark) Karsten Meier | (Denmark) Jesper Helledie | (Sweden) Cheddi Liljeström |
| Men's singles | (Denmark) Karsten Meier | (Denmark) Jesper Helledie | (Russia) Vladimir Koloskov |
| Women's singles | (England) Betty Bartlett | (Scotland) Christine Black | (England) Anita Harris |
| Women's singles | (England) Betty Bartlett | (Scotland) Christine Black | (France) Marie-Odile Puype |
| Men's doubles | (England) Peter Emptage (Netherlands) Rob Ridder | (Austria) Tariq Farooq (Denmark) Karsten Meier | (Malaysia) Bruni Garip (Malaysia) Anthony Linggian |
| Men's doubles | (England) Peter Emptage (Netherlands) Rob Ridder | (Austria) Tariq Farooq (Denmark) Karsten Meier | (Russia) Vladimir Koloskov (Russia) Igor Ponomarev |
| Women's doubles | (Scotland) Christine Black (Netherlands) Marjan Ridder | (England) Betty Bartlett (England) Brenda Creasey | (England) Lin Wilde (England) Janet B. Williams |
| Mixed doubles | (England) Peter Emptage (England) Betty Bartlett | (Netherlands) Rob Ridder (Netherlands) Marjan Ridder | (Sweden) Cheddi Liljeström (Denmark) Jette Nielsen |
| Mixed doubles | (England) Peter Emptage (England) Betty Bartlett | (Netherlands) Rob Ridder (Netherlands) Marjan Ridder | (England) Julian Clapp (England) Anita Harris |
70+
| Men's singles | (South Africa) Johan Croukamp | (Sweden) Stefan Ohras | (Thailand) Bandid Jaiyen |
| Men's singles | (South Africa) Johan Croukamp | (Sweden) Stefan Ohras | (Denmark) Christian Hansen |
| Women's singles | (United States) Rose Lei | (Denmark) Jette Nielsen | (Denmark) Thea Gyldenøhr |
| Women's singles | (United States) Rose Lei | (Denmark) Jette Nielsen | (Sweden) Lieselotte Wengberg |
| Men's doubles | (South Africa) Johan Croukamp (Finland) Carl-Johan Nybergh | (England) Robert J. Bell (England) Graham Holt | (England) Edward Hayes (England) Abdul Malique |
| Men's doubles | (South Africa) Johan Croukamp (Finland) Carl-Johan Nybergh | (England) Robert J. Bell (England) Graham Holt | (Denmark) Knud Danielsen (Denmark) Torben Hansen |
| Women's doubles | (Denmark) Jette Nielsen (Denmark) Irene Sterlie | (England) Sylvia Gill (England) Jan Hewett | (Sweden) Ewa Carlander (Sweden) Gabriele Johansson |
| Women's doubles | (Denmark) Jette Nielsen (Denmark) Irene Sterlie | (England) Sylvia Gill (England) Jan Hewett | (Denmark) Thea Gyldenøhr (Sweden) Lieselotte Wengberg |
| Mixed doubles | (Denmark) Christian Hansen (Denmark) Irene Sterlie | (England) Robert J. Bell (England) Wandy Arscott | (Sweden) Stefan Ohras (Sweden) Gabriele Johansson |
| Mixed doubles | (Denmark) Christian Hansen (Denmark) Irene Sterlie | (England) Robert J. Bell (England) Wandy Arscott | (England) Edward Hayes (England) Sylvia Gill |
75+
| Men's singles | (Denmark) Kund Danielsen | (Poland) Paweł Gasz | (Thailand) Pirachitra Surakkhaka |
| Men's singles | (Denmark) Kund Danielsen | (Poland) Paweł Gasz | (Germany) Matthias Kiefer |
| Women's singles | (England) Mary Jenner | (Germany) Elvira Richter | (India) Olga D'Costa |
| Men's doubles | (England) Ian Brothers (England) Ray Sharp | (Norway) Knut Sverre Liland (Thailand) Pirachitra Surakkhaka | (Sweden) Denis Bengtsson (England) Kenneth Tantum |
| Men's doubles | (England) Ian Brothers (England) Ray Sharp | (Norway) Knut Sverre Liland (Thailand) Pirachitra Surakkhaka | (Poland) Paweł Gasz (Poland) Czesław Gwiazda |
| Mixed doubles | (England) Kenneth Tantum (England) Vicki Betts | (England) Ray Sharp (England) Mary Jenner | (Norway) Knut Sverre Liland (Sweden) Lisbeth Bengtsson |
| Mixed doubles | (England) Kenneth Tantum (England) Vicki Betts | (England) Ray Sharp (England) Mary Jenner | (Germany) Matthias Kiefer (Germany) Elvira Richter |
