= Hsueh Hsuan-yi =

Taiwanese badminton player

Hsueh Hsuan-yi 薛軒億
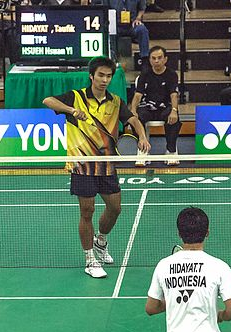

Personal information
- Born: 26 October 1985 (age 41) Taiwan
- Height: 1.85 m (6 ft 1 in)
- Weight: 75 kg (165 lb)

Sport
- Country: Republic of China (Taiwan)
- Sport: Badminton

Men's singles
- Highest ranking: 31 (17 November 2011)
- Current ranking: 170 (19 April 2018)
- BWF profile
Medal record
Men's badminton
Representing Chinese Taipei
Asian Games
Bronze medal – third place	2014 Incheon	Men's team
East Asian Games
Bronze medal – third place	2009 Hong Kong	Men's singles
Bronze medal – third place	2009 Hong Kong	Men's team
Summer Universiade
Bronze medal – third place	2011 Shenzhen	Men's singles
Bronze medal – third place	2011 Shenzhen	Mixed team

Hsueh Hsuan-yi (Chinese: 薛軒億; pinyin: Xuē Xuānyì; born 26 October 1985) is a Taiwanese badminton player. In 2014 he participated at the Asian Games. In 2009, he became the runner-up at the U.S. Open tournament, defeated by Taufik Hidayat of Indonesia in the final round. In 2011, he won the Dutch Open tournament after beating his compatriot Chou Tien-chen. In 2013, he became the runner-up at the Macau Open tournament.

== Achievements ==
=== BWF World Senior Championships ===
Men's singles

Year	Venue	Age	Opponent	Score	Result
2021	Palacio de los Deportes Carolina Marín, Huelva, Spain	35+	(France) Anthony Nelson	Walkover	Silver

=== East Asian Games ===
Men's singles
Year	Venue	Opponent	Score	Result
2009	Queen Elizabeth Stadium, Hong Kong	(South Korea) Choi Ho-jin	17–21, 13–21	Bronze

=== Summer Universiade ===
Men's singles
Year	Venue	Opponent	Score	Result
2011	Gymnasium of SZIIT; Shenzhen, China	(Thailand) Suppanyu Avihingsanon	17–21, 21–17, 17–21	Bronze

=== BWF Grand Prix ===
The BWF Grand Prix has two levels, Grand Prix and Grand Prix Gold. It is a series of badminton tournaments, sanctioned by the Badminton World Federation (BWF) since 2007.

Men's singles
Year	Tournament	Opponent	Score	Result
2013	Macau Open	(South Korea) Son Wan-ho	11–21, 15–21	(silver) Runner-up
2011	Dutch Open	(Chinese Taipei) Chou Tien-chen	18–21, 21–15, 21–16	(gold) Winner
2009	U.S. Open	(Indonesia) Taufik Hidayat	15–21, 16–21	(silver) Runner-up

BWF Grand Prix Gold tournament
BWF Grand Prix tournament

=== BWF International Challenge/Series ===
Men's singles
Year	Tournament	Opponent	Score	Result
2018	Malaysia International	(Malaysia) Tan Jia Wei	21–18, 21–19	(gold) Winner
2017	Osaka International	(Japan) Yu Igarashi	23–25, 14–21	(silver) Runner-up
2010	Vietnam International	(Japan) Koichi Saeki	21–14, 21–16	(gold) Winner

BWF International Challenge tournament
BWF Future Series tournament
