= Ray Sharp (badminton) =

English badminton player

Personal information
- Nationality: British (English)
- Born: 23 April 1945 (age 81) Dartford, Kent

Sport
- Sport: Badminton
Medal record
Men's badminton
Representing England
Commonwealth Games
Bronze medal – third place	1970 Edinburgh	Men's singles

Raymond Sharp (born 23 April 1945) is a former badminton player from England.

== Biography ==
Sharp was a two times national champion after winning the singles at the English National Badminton Championships in 1968 and 1969.

Sharp represented the England team at the 1970 British Commonwealth Games in Edinburgh, Scotland. He competed in the badminton events, winning a bronze medal in the singles.

== Achievements ==
=== Commonwealth Games ===
Men's singles

Year	Venue	Opponent	Score	Result
1970	Meadowbank Stadium, Edinburgh, Scotland	(India) Suresh Goel	15–9, 15–12	Bronze

=== International tournaments ===
Men's singles

Year	Tournament	Opponent	Score	Result
1969	Scottish Open	(Malaysia) Oon Chong Hau	9–15, 4–15	(silver) Runner-up
1969	Irish Open	(Mexico) Roy Díaz González	15–11, 7–15, 15–11	(gold) Winner

Men's doubles

Year	Tournament	Partner	Opponent	Score	Result
1969	Scottish Open	(England) Paul Whetnall	(Scotland) Mac Henderson (Scotland) Robert McCoig	18–16, 13–15, 18–14	(gold) Winner
1977	Belgian International	(England) Ray Rofe	(West Germany) Hans-Dietrich Emmers (West Germany) Bernd Wessels	15–5, 11–15, 15–7	(gold) Winner
