= Palacio de los Deportes Carolina Marín =

Indoor sports arena in Huelva, Spain

Coordinates: 37.26541°N 6.92326°W

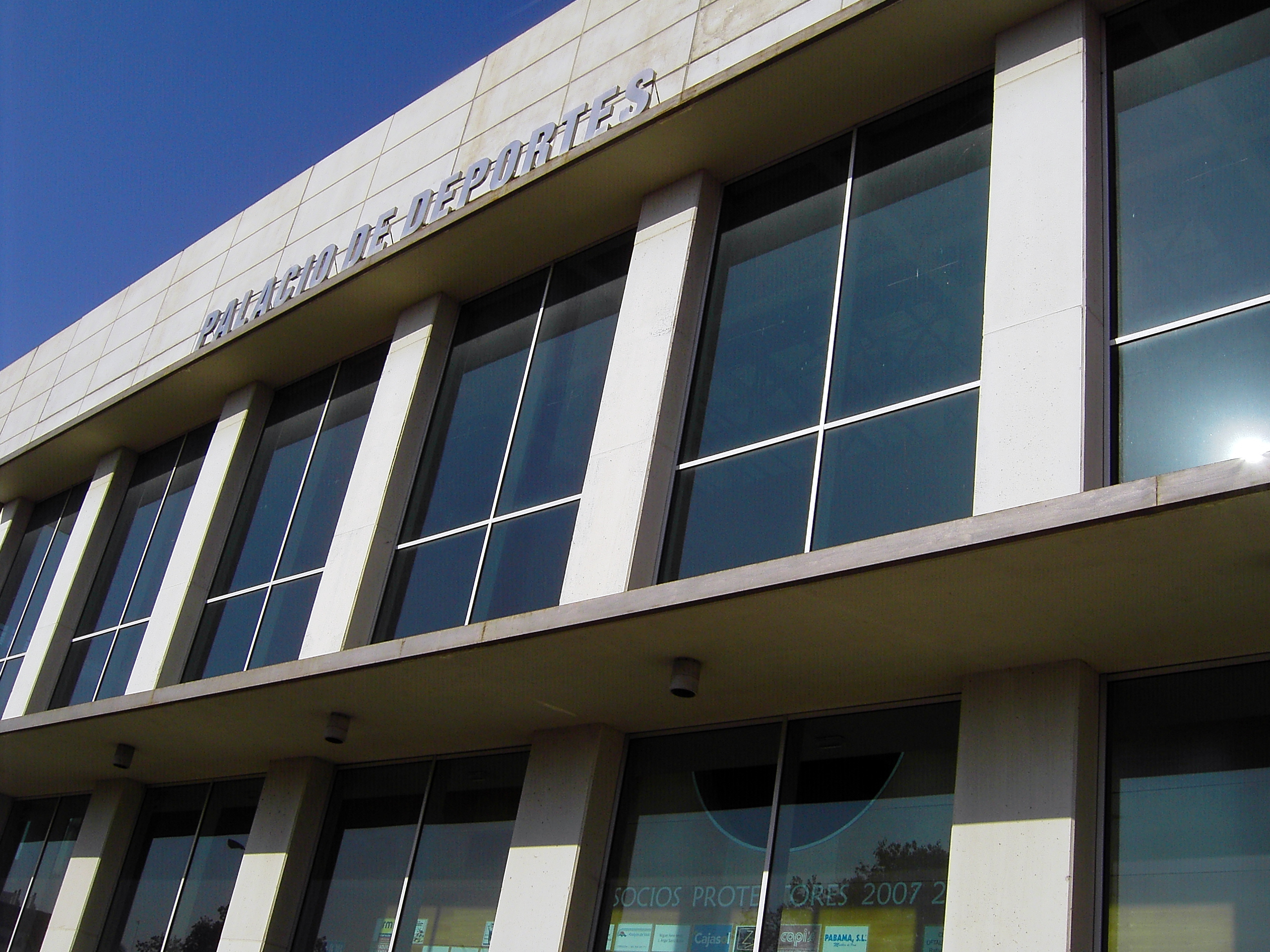
- Interactive map of Palacio de los Deportes Carolina Marín
- Address: Avenida de las Fuerzas Armadas; Huelva, Andalusia, Spain
- Owner: Huelva City Council
- Capacity: 5,500
- Surface: Parquet floor

Construction
- Opened: 1999
- Cost: 6.7 million euros
- Architect: ACS Group

Tenants
- CD Huelva Baloncesto (2008-present); CB Ciudad de Huelva (1999-2008)

Palacio de los Deportes Carolina Marín is a Spanish sports complex in the city of Huelva, in Andalusia, Spain. Her name is a tribute to the Huelva badminton player Carolina Marín. It is the most important indoor sports facility with the largest capacity in all of Huelva and the province.

The Palacio de los Deportes has hosted CB Ciudad de Huelva matches since they moved from the Andrés Estrada Sports Center. They began playing at the Palacio in 1999-00, until his disappearance in 2008; being the modern pavilion in which the Huelva team fought to return to the Liga ACB, being about to achieve it in the 2004–05 and 2006–07 seasons. It registered a historic full house in the fourth promotion match of the 2004–05 season between CB Ciudad de Huelva and Baloncesto Fuenlabrada, in which, in the event of a Huelva victory, Ciudad would return to the Liga ACB, although it was finally the Madrid team the one who achieved the square.

After the disappearance of the CB Ciudad de Huelva, the CD Huelva Baloncesto was founded which, since then, has been a venue in the Palace.

In April 2018 it hosted the XVIII European Badminton Championships, and it also host the XXVI World Badminton Championships at the end of 2021.
