= 2010 Malaysia Open Grand Prix Gold =

Tournament details
- Dates: 6 – 11 July 2010
- Level: Grand Prix Gold
- Total prize money: US$120,000
- Venue: Johor Bahru City Stadium
- Location: Johor, Malaysia

Champions
- Men's singles: (Malaysia) Lee Chong Wei
- Women's singles: (Hong Kong) Yip Pui Yin
- Men's doubles: (Indonesia) Markis Kido (Indonesia) Hendra Setiawan
- Women's doubles: (Thailand) Duanganong Aroonkesorn (Thailand) Kunchala Voravichitchaikul
- Mixed doubles: (Indonesia) Devin Lahardi Fitriawan (Indonesia) Liliyana Natsir

The 2010 Malaysia Open Grand Prix Gold was the fourth grand prix's badminton tournament of the 2010 BWF Grand Prix Gold and Grand Prix. The tournament was held at the Johor Bahru City Stadium in Johor, Malaysia from 6 to 11 July 2010 and had a total purse of $120,000.

== Men's singles ==
=== Seeds ===
1. (Malaysia) Lee Chong Wei (champion)
2. (Indonesia) Taufik Hidayat (semifinals)
3. (Thailand) Boonsak Ponsana (withdrew)
4. (Malaysia) Wong Choong Hann (finals)
5. (Hong Kong) Hu Yun (quarterfinals)
6. (Malaysia) Muhammad Hafiz Hashim (quarterfinals)
7. (Hong Kong) Chan Yan Kit (quarterfinals)
8. (Indonesia) Andre Kurniawan Tedjono (quarterfinals)
9. (Denmark) Hans-Kristian Vittinghus (third round)
10. (India) Anand Pawar (first round)
11. (Hong Kong) Wong Wing Ki (third round)
12. (Malaysia) Chong Wei Feng (third round)
13. (Malaysia) Tan Chun Seang (third round)
14. (India) Ajay Jayaram (semifinals)
15. (Malaysia) Beryno Wong (second round)
16. (Malaysia) Chan Kwong Beng (first round)

=== Finals ===
Quarterfinals
1	(Malaysia) Lee Chong Wei	21	21
8	(Indonesia) Andre Kurniawan Tedjono	11	9
14	(India) Ajay Jayaram	21	21
7	(Hong Kong) Chan Yan Kit	19	13
6	(Malaysia) Muhammad Hafiz Hashim	21	17	11
4	(Malaysia) Wong Choong Hann	19	21	21
5	(Hong Kong) Hu Yun	13	21	11
2	(Indonesia) Taufik Hidayat	21	9	21

Semifinals
1	(Malaysia) Lee Chong Wei	21	21
14	(India) Ajay Jayaram	16	13
4	(Malaysia) Wong Choong Hann	21	24
2	(Indonesia) Taufik Hidayat	15	22

Final
1	(Malaysia) Lee Chong Wei	21	14	21
4	(Malaysia) Wong Choong Hann	8	21	15

=== Top half ===
==== Section 1 ====
First Round
1	(Malaysia) Lee C W	21	21
(England) A Bhokanandh	8	10
(Malaysia) Liew D	21	15	25
(Japan) S Hayasakai	16	21	23
11	(Hong Kong) Wong W K	21	21
(Singapore) Ng Z R	10	11
(New Zealand) M Hu He	0	10
(Malaysia) Goh S H	21	21

Second Round
1	(Malaysia) Lee C W	21	21
(Malaysia) Liew D	16	14
11	(Hong Kong) Wong W K	21	21
(Malaysia) Goh S H	7	15

Third Round
1	(Malaysia) Lee C W	21	21
11	(Hong Kong) Wong W K	18	11

==== Section 2 ====
First Round
8	(Indonesia) A K Tedjono	21	21
(Malaysia) Hoo K L	11	9
(Czech Republic) L Zevl	7	16
(Singapore) R Gonansa	21	21
12	(Malaysia) Chong W F	21	21
Q7	(Denmark) M Bue	7	10
(Malaysia) Lok C C	21	21
(Singapore) K Ho	7	5

Second Round
8	(Indonesia) A K Tedjono	21	22
(Singapore) R Gonansa	15	20
12	(Malaysia) Chong W F	21	22
(Malaysia) Lok C C	12	20

Third Round
8	(Indonesia) A K Tedjono	21	21
12	(Malaysia) Chong W F	9	9

==== Section 3 ====
First Round
PFQ	(Ghana) D N Aryeetey
Q5	(Denmark) R Fladberg	w	/	o
(Malaysia) Lim Y S	21	21
(Singapore) A A Prasojo	12	18
14	(India) A Jayaram	21	21
(Malaysia) Chiang J S	19	6
(Malaysia) Pei W C	13	13
Q6	(Malaysia) Goh G C	21	21

Second Round
Q5	(Denmark) R Fladberg	21	13	21
(Malaysia) Lim Y S	12	21	12
14	(India) A Jayaram	21	21
Q6	(Malaysia) Goh G C	12	15

Third Round
Q5	(Denmark) R Fladberg	19	18
14	(India) A Jayaram	21	21

==== Section 4 ====
First Round
7	(Hong Kong) Chan Y K	21	21
PFQ	(Egypt) M El Sayad	8	6
(Malaysia) I Z Zainuddin	21	21
(Hong Kong) Chan Y L	15	17
9	(Denmark) H-K Vittinghus	21	21
(Malaysia) Lim F Y	7	16
(Sri Lanka) D Karunaratne	8	18
(Malaysia) M S M Ismail	21	21

Second Round
7	(Hong Kong) Chan Y K	21	16	21
(Malaysia) I Z Zainuddin	10	21	18
9	(Denmark) H-K Vittinghus	21	21
(Malaysia) M S M Ismail	13	16

Third Round
7	(Hong Kong) Chan Y K	21	21
9	(Denmark) H-K Vittinghus	17	12

=== Bottom half ===
==== Section 5 ====
First Round
(Indonesia) F Adnan	21	21
(Malaysia) Wong K Y	14	14
(Japan) K Saeki	18	21	21
16	(Malaysia) Chan K B	21	15	17
(Sri Lanka) N Karunaratne	21	21
(Malaysia) M R Misbun	18	9
(Netherlands) A Saber	12	15
6	(Malaysia) M H Hashim	21	21

Second Round
(Indonesia) F Adnan	21	21
(Japan) K Saeki	14	14
(Sri Lanka) N Karunaratne	8	19
6	(Malaysia) M H Hashim	21	21

Third Round
(Indonesia) F Adnan	10	11
6	(Malaysia) M H Hashim	21	21

==== Section 6 ====
First Round
Q2	(Hong Kong) Wei N	21	19	21
Q3	(Malaysia) Tan K M	11	21	16
(Ghana) N S Mensah
15	(Malaysia) B Wong	w	/	o
Q4	(Malaysia) Soo T Z	19	12
(Malaysia) Z Zulkiffli	21	21
(Indonesia) A Pratama	14	9
4	(Malaysia) Wong C H	21	21

Second Round
Q2	(Hong Kong) Wei N	21	21
15	(Malaysia) B Wong	16	14
(Malaysia) Z Zulkiffli	12	10
4	(Malaysia) Wong C H	21	21

Third Round
Q2	(Hong Kong) Wei N	24	6	17
4	(Malaysia) Wong C H	22	21	21

==== Section 7 ====
First Round
(Philippines) R I Mendez	12	14
(England) H Wright	21	21
(Malaysia) K Yogendran	18	22	21
10	(India) A Pawar	21	20	16
(Thailand) P Vilailak	21	21
(Singapore) Huang C	12	16
(Malaysia) M A A Latif	20	18
5	(Hong Kong) Hu Y	22	21

Second Round
(England) H Wright	10	17
(Malaysia) K Yogendran	21	21
(Thailand) P Vilailak	21	13	15
5	(Hong Kong) Hu Y	9	21	21

Third Round
(Malaysia) K Yogendran	12	24	16
5	(Hong Kong) Hu Y	21	22	21

==== Section 8 ====
First Round
Q1	(Malaysia) Soong J V	21	21
(Iraq) Y Azad	19	18
(Thailand) S Avihingsanon	8	21	18
13	(Malaysia) Tan C S	21	19	21
(Malaysia) Yeoh K B	21	21
(Wales) R Popat	18	7
Q8	(Malaysia) N M A Ayub	15	18
2	(Indonesia) T Hidayat	21	21

Second Round
Q1	(Malaysia) Soong J V	21	9	18
13	(Malaysia) Tan C S	15	21	21
(Malaysia) Yeoh K B	9	18
2	(Indonesia) T Hidayat	21	12

Third Round
13	(Malaysia) Tan C S	21	20
2	(Indonesia) T Hidayat	23	22

== Women's singles ==
=== Seeds ===
1. (France) Pi Hongyan (semifinals)
2. (Hong Kong) Zhou Mi (finals)
3. (Hong Kong) Yip Pui Yin (champion)
4. (Malaysia) Wong Mew Choo (semifinals)
5. (Thailand) Salakjit Ponsana (quarterfinals)
6. (Indonesia) Maria Febe Kusumastuti (first round)
7. (Indonesia) Fransisca Ratnasari (first round)
8. (Hong Kong) Chan Tsz Ka (quarterfinals)

=== Finals ===
Semifinals
1	(France) Pi Hongyan	21	10	11
3	(Hong Kong) Yip Pui Yin	10	21	21
4	(Malaysia) Wong Mew Choo	21	12	15
2	(Hong Kong) Zhou Mi	19	21	21

Final
3	(Hong Kong) Yip Pui Yin	21	14	21
2	(Hong Kong) Zhou Mi	16	21	19

=== Top half ===
==== Section 1 ====
First Round
1	(France) Pi HY	12	21	21
(Hong Kong) Tse Y S	21	16	17
(Singapore) Xing AY	10	21	21
(Thailand) R Intanon	21	19	19
5	(Thailand) S Ponsana	21	21
(Malaysia) S Saniru	13	18
(New Zealand) M Chan	3	11
(Indonesia) M K Yulianti	21	21

Second Round
1	(France) Pi HY	21	16	21
(Singapore) Xing AY	17	21	15
5	(Thailand) S Ponsana	13	21	21
(Indonesia) M K Yulianti	21	17	18

Quarterfinals
1	(France) Pi HY	21	14	21
5	(Thailand) S Ponsana	12	21	10

==== Section 2 ====
First Round
3	(Hong Kong) Yip P Y	21	19	21
(Thailand) N Jindapol	15	21	18
(Malaysia) L Cheah	21	21
(United States) R Wang	13	5
7	(Indonesia) F Ratnasari	17	21	17
(Malaysia) Tee J Y	21	7	21
Q3	(Malaysia) Yang L L	13	21	11
(Macau) Wang R	21	19	21

Second Round
3	(Hong Kong) Yip P Y	21	21
(Malaysia) L Cheah	11	19
(Malaysia) Tee J Y	21	9	21
(Macau) Wang R	18	21	19

Quarterfinals
3	(Hong Kong) Yip P Y	21	21
(Malaysia) Tee J Y	8	14

=== Bottom half ===
==== Section 3 ====
First Round
Q4	(Hong Kong) Poon L Y	11	11
(Thailand) P Buranaprasertsuk	21	21
(Norway) S Kvaerno	12	6
8	(Hong Kong) Chan T K	21	21
(Hong Kong) Mong K Y	19	21	21
(United States) K C Velez	21	17	18
(Singapore) Chen J Y	8	13
4	(Malaysia) Wong M C	21	21

Second Round
(Thailand) P Buranaprasertsuk	19	21	18
8	(Hong Kong) Chan T K	21	9	21
(Hong Kong) Mong K Y	14	11
4	(Malaysia) Wong M C	21	21

Quarterfinals
8	(Hong Kong) Chan T K	12	13
4	(Malaysia) Wong M C	21	21

==== Section 4 ====
First Round
(Australia) L Choo	13	17
(France) S V Waran	21	21
(Japan) M Matsutomo	19	21	21
6	(Indonesia) M F Kusumastuti	21	11	15
(Hong Kong) Chan H Y	10	13
Q1	(Malaysia) S Cheah	21	21
Q2	(Malaysia) F Ng S F	11	11
2	(Hong Kong) Zhou M	21	21

Second Round
(France) S V Waran	13	21	15
(Japan) M Matsutomo	21	13	21
Q1	(Malaysia) S Cheah	15	20
2	(Hong Kong) Zhou M	21	22

Quarterfinals
(Japan) M Matsutomo	14	9
2	(Hong Kong) Zhou M	21	21

== Men's doubles ==
=== Seeds ===
1. (Malaysia) Koo Kien Keat / Tan Boon Heong (quarterfinals)
2. (Indonesia) Markis Kido / Hendra Setiawan (champion)
3. (Indonesia) Hendra Aprida Gunawan / Alvent Yulianto (finals)
4. (Malaysia) Mohd Zakry Abdul Latif / Mohd Fairuzizuan Mohd Tazari (withdrew)
5. (Malaysia) Choong Tan Fook / Lee Wan Wah (second round)
6. (Malaysia) Gan Teik Chai / Tan Bin Shen (quarterfinals)
7. (Malaysia) Chan Peng Soon / Lim Khim Wah (second round)
8. (Hong Kong) Yohan Hadikusumo Wiratama / Wong Wai Hong (semifinals)

=== Finals ===
Semifinals
(Malaysia) Mak Hee Chun (Malaysia) Tan Wee Kiong	13	11
3	(Indonesia) Hendra Aprida Gunawan (Indonesia) Alvent Yulianto	21	21
8	(Hong Kong) Yohan Hadikusumo Wiratama (Hong Kong) Wong Wai Hong	6	16
2	(Indonesia) Markis Kido (Indonesia) Hendra Setiawan	21	21

Final
3	(Indonesia) Hendra Aprida Gunawan (Indonesia) Alvent Yulianto	21	17	12
2	(Indonesia) Markis Kido (Indonesia) Hendra Setiawan	8	21	21

=== Top half ===
==== Section 1 ====
First Round
1	(Malaysia) Koo K K (Malaysia) Tan B H	21	21
Q2	(Malaysia) Goh S O (Malaysia) Tan W T	10	12
PFQ	(Ghana) D N Aryeetey (Ghana) N S Mensah
(Malaysia) Ow Y H (Malaysia) Yew H K	w	/	o
7	(Malaysia) Chan P S (Malaysia) Lim K W	21	21
(Japan) N Kawamae (Japan) S Sato	16	18
(Malaysia) Mak H C (Malaysia) Tan W K	21	21
(Indonesia) T K Wardana (Indonesia) K S Wijaya	15	9

Second Round
1	(Malaysia) Koo K K (Malaysia) Tan B H	21	21
(Malaysia) Ow Y H (Malaysia) Yew H K	7	13
7	(Malaysia) Chan P S (Malaysia) Lim K W	21	20	15
(Malaysia) Mak H C (Malaysia) Tan W K	12	22	21

Quarterfinals
1	(Malaysia) Koo K K (Malaysia) Tan B H	19	19
(Malaysia) Mak H C (Malaysia) Tan W K	21	21

==== Section 2 ====
First Round
3	(Indonesia) H A Gunawan (Indonesia) A Yulianto	21	21
(Malaysia) Goh J H (Malaysia) M R A Latif	14	18
(Malaysia) N Heg W K (Malaysia) Teo E Y	21	20	21
Q4	(Denmark) R Fladberg (Denmark) N Nohr	15	22	17
6	(Malaysia) Gan T C (Malaysia) Tan B S	21	21
Q1	(Indonesia) A Anhar (Indonesia) H S Nugroho	14	16
(Singapore) Liu Y (Singapore) T Yeo	21	21
(Hong Kong) Leung C Y (Hong Kong) Lo L K	18	15

Second Round
3	(Indonesia) H A Gunawan (Indonesia) A Yulianto	21	21
(Malaysia) N Heg W K (Malaysia) Teo E Y	6	18
6	(Malaysia) Gan T C (Malaysia) Tan B S	21	21
(Singapore) Liu Y (Singapore) T Yeo	15	16

Quarterfinals
3	(Indonesia) H A Gunawan (Indonesia) A Yulianto	21	16
6	(Malaysia) Gan T C (Malaysia) Tan B S	6	5^{r}

=== Bottom half ===
==== Section 3 ====
First Round
Q3	(Malaysia) Chooi K M (Malaysia) Pang Z L	24	21
(Malaysia) Chow P C (Malaysia) Hong C H	22	12
(Malaysia) Chan C M (Malaysia) Chew C E	15	26	17
8	(Hong Kong) Y H Wiratama (Hong Kong) Wong W H	21	24	21
(Malaysia) K Yogendran (Malaysia) Yeoh K B	17	20
(Indonesia) F Kurniawan (Indonesia) W Windarto	21	22
(Indonesia) A Pratama (Indonesia) R A Saputro	21	21
PFQ	(Malaysia) M L Zaim (Malaysia) V I Mawan	14	18

Second Round
Q3	(Malaysia) Chooi K M (Malaysia) Pang Z L	14	16
8	(Hong Kong) Y H Wiratama (Hong Kong) Wong W H	21	21
(Indonesia) F Kurniawan (Indonesia) W Windarto	21	13	15
(Indonesia) A Pratama (Indonesia) R A Saputro	17	21	21

Quarterfinals
8	(Hong Kong) Y H Wiratama (Hong Kong) Wong W H	10	21	21
(Indonesia) A Pratama (Indonesia) R A Saputro	21	11	16

==== Section 4 ====
First Round
(Indonesia) L Hadiyanto (Indonesia) C Wijaya	21	21
(Netherlands) R Bosch (Netherlands) K Ridder	18	9
(Sri Lanka) D Karunaratne (Sri Lanka) N Karunaratne	9	20
5	(Malaysia) Choong T F (Malaysia) Lee W W	21	22
(Japan) H Endo (Japan) K Hayakawa	18	21	10
(Malaysia) Hoon T H (Malaysia) Ong S H	21	15	21
(Malaysia) Goh V S (Malaysia) Teo K S	21	9	15
2	(Indonesia) M Kido (Indonesia) H Setiawan	18	21	21

Second Round
(Indonesia) L Hadiyanto (Indonesia) C Wijaya	21	21
5	(Malaysia) Choong T F (Malaysia) Lee W W	17	17
(Malaysia) Hoon T H (Malaysia) Ong S H	19	21	20
2	(Indonesia) M Kido (Indonesia) H Setiawan	21	19	22

Quarterfinals
(Indonesia) L Hadiyanto (Indonesia) C Wijaya	10	17
2	(Indonesia) M Kido (Indonesia) H Setiawan	21	21

== Women's doubles ==
=== Seeds ===
1. (Malaysia) Chin Eei Hui / Wong Pei Tty (first round)
2. (Thailand) Savitree Amitrapai / Vacharaporn Munkit (quarterfinals)
3. (Japan) Misaki Matsutomo / Ayaka Takahashi (second round)
4. (Thailand) Duanganong Aroonkesorn / Kunchala Voravichitchaikul (champion)
5. (Macau) Zhang Dan / Zhang Zhibo (semifinals)
6. (Malaysia) Vivian Hoo Kah Mun / Woon Khe Wei (second round)
7. (Japan) Rie Eto / Yu Wakita (quarterfinals)
8. (Netherlands) Lotte Jonathans / Paulien van Dooremalen (quarterfinals)

=== Finals ===
Semifinals
(Indonesia) Vita Marissa (Indonesia) Nadya Melati	21	17	17
4	(Thailand) Duanganong Aroonkesorn (Thailand) Kunchala Voravichitchaikul	13	21	21
(Malaysia) Ng Hui Ern (Malaysia) Ng Hui Lin	21	21
5	(Macau) Zhang Dan (Macau) Zhang Zhibo	10	11

Final
4	(Thailand) Duanganong Aroonkesorn (Thailand) Kunchala Voravichitchaikul	12	21	21
(Malaysia) Ng Hui Ern (Malaysia) Ng Hui Lin	21	17	13

=== Top half ===
==== Section 1 ====
First Round
1	(Malaysia) Chin E H (Malaysia) Wong P T	23	12
(Indonesia) V Marissa (Indonesia) N Melati	25	21
(Malaysia) Chow M K (Malaysia) Lee M Y	21	17	20
Q1	(Indonesia) W Anggraini (Indonesia) R P Dili	18	21	22
8	(Netherlands) L Jonathans (Netherlands) P v Dooremalen	21	21
(Hong Kong) Chan H Y (Hong Kong) Poon L Y	19	8
Q4	(Malaysia) N Baharum (Malaysia) Ti W C	19	21	21
Q2	(Malaysia) Chan W R (Malaysia) M Lim P C	21	19	15

Second Round
(Indonesia) V Marissa (Indonesia) N Melati	21	21
Q1	(Indonesia) W Anggraini (Indonesia) R P Dili	17	19
8	(Netherlands) L Jonathans (Netherlands) P v Dooremalen	21	21
Q4	(Malaysia) N Baharum (Malaysia) Ti W C	8	11

Quarterfinals
(Indonesia) V Marissa (Indonesia) N Melati	21	21
8	(Netherlands) L Jonathans (Netherlands) P v Dooremalen	19	10

==== Section 2 ====
First Round
4	(Thailand) D Aroonkesorn (Thailand) K Voravichitchaikul	21	21
(Denmark) L Grebak (Denmark) A Madsen	8	11
(Australia) L Choo (Australia) K W-Smith	20	21	12
(Malaysia) N S A Latif (Malaysia) M Ng P L	22	9	21
7	(Japan) R Eto (Japan) Y Wakita	21	21
(Singapore) Chen J Y (Singapore) Gu J	6	6
(Malaysia) Lai P J (Malaysia) S J Lai	21	21
(Denmark) C Andersen (New Zealand) M Chan	12	13

Second Round
4	(Thailand) D Aroonkesorn (Thailand) K Voravichitchaikul	24	22
(Malaysia) N S A Latif (Malaysia) M Ng P L	22	20
7	(Japan) R Eto (Japan) Y Wakita	21	21
(Malaysia) Lai P J (Malaysia) S J Lai	11	16

Quarterfinals
4	(Thailand) D Aroonkesorn (Thailand) K Voravichitchaikul	21	14	21
7	(Japan) R Eto (Japan) Y Wakita	18	21	16

=== Bottom half ===
==== Section 3 ====
First Round
(Indonesia) S R Andini (Indonesia) D D Haris	11	20
(Hong Kong) Chan T K (Hong Kong) Chau H W	21	22
(Denmark) C P Nielsen (Denmark) D S Larsen	14	10
6	(Malaysia) V Hoo K M (Malaysia) Woon K W	21	21
(United States) I Wang (United States) R Wang	15	11
(Malaysia) Ng H E (Malaysia) Ng H L	21	21
(Indonesia) K Dewi (Indonesia) K N Hanadia	21	18	20
3	(Japan) M Matsutomo (Japan) A Takahashi	13	21	22

Second Round
(Hong Kong) Chan T K (Hong Kong) Chau H W	20	21	21
6	(Malaysia) V Hoo K M (Malaysia) Woon K W	22	12	18
(Malaysia) Ng H E (Malaysia) Ng H L	21	11	21
3	(Japan) M Matsutomo (Japan) A Takahashi	14	21	13

Quarterfinals
(Hong Kong) Chan T K (Hong Kong) Chau H W	13	21
(Malaysia) Ng H E (Malaysia) Ng H L	21	23

==== Section 4 ====
First Round
(Singapore) Mok J Q (Singapore) S Neo	10	16
(Malaysia) Goh L Y (Malaysia) Lim Y L	21	21
Q3	(Japan) S Asahara (Japan) Y Kanamori	14	18
5	(Macau) Zhang D (Macau) Zhang ZB	21	21
(Malaysia) S Cheah (Malaysia) Yang L L	21	21
(Singapore) Thng T T (Singapore) Xing AY	10	15
(Malaysia) N A Aziz (Malaysia) Ng S E	5	10
2	(Thailand) S Amitrapai (Thailand) V Munkit	21	21

Second Round
(Malaysia) Goh L Y (Malaysia) Lim Y L	13	16
5	(Macau) Zhang D (Macau) Zhang ZB	21	21
(Malaysia) S Cheah (Malaysia) Yang L L	7	6
2	(Thailand) S Amitrapai (Thailand) V Munkit	21	21

Quarterfinals
5	(Macau) Zhang D (Macau) Zhang ZB	21	21
2	(Thailand) S Amitrapai (Thailand) V Munkit	15	18

== Mixed doubles ==
=== Seeds ===
1. (Indonesia) Hendra Aprida Gunawan / Vita Marissa (quarterfinals)
2. (Thailand) Songphon Anugritayawon / Kunchala Voravichitchaikul (withdrew)
3. (Thailand) Sudket Prapakamol / Saralee Thungthongkam (finals)
4. (Malaysia) Chan Peng Soon / Goh Liu Ying (quarterfinals)
5. (Indonesia) Flandy Limpele / (Netherlands) Lotte Jonathans (second round)
6. (Hong Kong) Yohan Hadikusumo Wiratama / Tse Ying Suet (first round)
7. (Japan) Shintaro Ikeda / Reiko Shiota (quarterfinals)
8. (Malaysia) Tan Wee Kiong / Woon Khe Wei (quarterfinals)

=== Finals ===
Semifinals
(Indonesia) Markis Kido (Indonesia) Lita Nurlita	21	12	15
3	(Thailand) Sudket Prapakamol (Thailand) Saralee Thoungthongkam	15	21	21
(Indonesia) Devin Lahardi Fitriawan (Indonesia) Liliyana Natsir	21	21
(Malaysia) Ong Jian Guo (Malaysia) Chong Sook Chin	13	16

Final
3	(Thailand) Sudket Prapakamol (Thailand) Saralee Thoungthongkam	21	16	17
(Indonesia) Devin Lahardi Fitriawan (Indonesia) Liliyana Natsir	13	21	21

=== Top half ===
==== Section 1 ====
First Round
1	(Indonesia) H A Gunawan (Indonesia) V Marissa	16	21	21
(Australia) G Warfe (Australia) K W-Smith	21	4	10
(Japan) K Hayakawa (Japan) A Takahashi	21	18	11
(Malaysia) Ow Y H (Malaysia) Lai P J	17	21	21
6	(Hong Kong) Y H Wiratama (Hong Kong) Tse Y S	21	16	4
(Malaysia) Gan T C (Malaysia) Ng H L	18	21	21
(Indonesia) M Kido (Indonesia) L Nurlita	21	21
(Malaysia) N Heg W K (Malaysia) S J Lai	11	15

Second Round
1	(Indonesia) H A Gunawan (Indonesia) V Marissa	21	21
(Malaysia) Ow Y H (Malaysia) Lai P J	11	12
(Malaysia) Gan T C (Malaysia) Ng H L	17	18
(Indonesia) M Kido (Indonesia) L Nurlita	21	21

Quarterfinals
1	(Indonesia) H A Gunawan (Indonesia) V Marissa	21	18	15
(Indonesia) M Kido (Indonesia) L Nurlita	10	21	21

==== Section 2 ====
First Round
3	(Thailand) S Prapakamol (Thailand) S Thoungthongkam	21	21
Q2	(Denmark) N Nohr (Denmark) L Grebak	7	13
(Indonesia) M R Delynugraha (Indonesia) R P Dili	21	21
(Malaysia) Tan W T (Malaysia) M Lim P C	16	19
8	(Malaysia) Tan W K (Malaysia) Woon K W	21	21
(Indonesia) T K Wardana (Indonesia) N Melati	15	18
(Japan) H Komiyama (Japan) S Asahara	21	10	17
(Malaysia) M R A Latif (Malaysia) M Ng P L	12	21	21

Second Round
3	(Thailand) S Prapakamol (Thailand) S Thoungthongkam	21	21
(Indonesia) M R Delynugraha (Indonesia) R P Dili	16	17
8	(Malaysia) Tan W K (Malaysia) Woon K W	21	11	21
(Malaysia) M R A Latif (Malaysia) M Ng P L	15	21	16

Quarterfinals
3	(Thailand) S Prapakamol (Thailand) S Thoungthongkam	21	21
8	(Malaysia) Tan W K (Malaysia) Woon K W	17	11

=== Bottom half ===
==== Section 3 ====
First Round
(Hong Kong) Wong W H (Hong Kong) Chau H W	19	9
(Indonesia) D L Fitriawan (Indonesia) L Natsir	21	21
(Hong Kong) Leung C Y (Hong Kong) Ng K S	13	10
5	(Indonesia) F Limpele (Netherlands) L Jonathans	21	21
(Czech Republic) L Zevl (Czech Republic) Z Pavelková	10	4
(Malaysia) Lim K W (Malaysia) Lim Y L	21	21
(Hong Kong) Lo L K (Hong Kong) Mong K Y	13	14
4	(Malaysia) Chan P S (Malaysia) Goh L Y	21	21

Second Round
(Indonesia) D L Fitriawan (Indonesia) L Natsir	21	17	21
5	(Indonesia) F Limpele (Netherlands) L Jonathans	3	21	12
(Malaysia) Lim K W (Malaysia) Lim Y L	19	21	13
4	(Malaysia) Chan P S (Malaysia) Goh L Y	21	14	21

Quarterfinals
(Indonesia) D L Fitriawan (Indonesia) L Natsir	21	21
4	(Malaysia) Chan P S (Malaysia) Goh L Y	11	9

==== Section 4 ====
First Round
(Indonesia) I Fadhilah (Indonesia) W Anggraini	21	20	21
Q1	(Japan) H Endo (Japan) Y Kanamori	18	22	11
(Malaysia) Tan B S (Malaysia) Ng H E	17	12
7	(Japan) S Ikeda (Japan) R Shiota	21	21
Q4	(Indonesia) N W Ardianto (Indonesia) H Nugraheni	11	12
(Malaysia) Ong J G (Malaysia) Chong S C	21	21
Q3	(Malaysia) Yeoh K B (United States) K C Velez	21	21
PFQ	(Singapore) J Wong (Singapore) Tan W H	10	9

Second Round
(Indonesia) I Fadhilah (Indonesia) W Anggraini	18	16
7	(Japan) S Ikeda (Japan) R Shiota	21	21
(Malaysia) Ong J G (Malaysia) Chong S C	21	21
Q3	(Malaysia) Yeoh K B (United States) K C Velez	17	6

Quarterfinals
7	(Japan) S Ikeda (Japan) R Shiota	21	18	12
(Malaysia) Ong J G (Malaysia) Chong S C	19	21	21
