= Hong Kong National Badminton Championships =

Badminton championships

The Hong Kong National Badminton Championships are held since 1937.

== Past winners ==
Year	Men's singles	Women's singles	Men's doubles	Women's doubles	Mixed doubles
2000	Agus Hariyanto	Wang Chen	Ma Che Kong; Yau Kwun Yuen	Chan Mei Mei; Ng Ching	Xiong Bo; Wang Chen
2001	Agus Hariyanto	Wang Chen	Albertus Susanto Njoto; Liu Kwok Wa	Chan Mei Mei; Wang Chen	Liu Kwok Wa; Louisa Koon Wai Chee
2002	Yohan Hadikusumo Wiratama	Louisa Koon Wai Chee	Albertus Susanto Njoto; Liu Kwok Wa	Ling Wan Ting; Siu Ching Man	Albertus Susanto Njoto; Li Wing Mui
2003	Agus Hariyanto	Wang Chen	Yohan Hadikusumo Wiratama; Yau Tsz Yuk	Wang Chen; Louisa Koon Wai Chee	Yohan Hadikusumo Wiratama; Wang Chen
2004	Agus Hariyanto	Wang Chen	Albertus Susanto Njoto; Liu Kwok Wa	Louisa Koon Wai Chee; Li Wing Mui	Albertus Susanto Njoto; Li Wing Mui
2005	Yohan Hadikusumo Wiratama	Wang Chen	Albertus Susanto Njoto; Liu Kwok Wa	Wang Chen; Yip Pui Yin	Liu Kwok Wa; Louisa Koon Wai Chee
2006	Ng Wei	Yip Pui Yin	Yohan Hadikusumo Wiratama; Albertus Susanto Njoto	Wong Man Ching; Chau Hoi Wah	Yohan Hadikusumo Wiratama; Louisa Koon Wai Chee
2007	Hu Yun	Zhou Mi	Hui Wai Ho; Alroy Tanama Putra	Wong Man Ching; Chau Hoi Wah	Yohan Hadikusumo Wiratama; Chau Hoi Wah
2008	Ng Wei	Yip Pui Yin	Yohan Hadikusumo Wiratama; Albertus Susanto Njoto	Louisa Koon Wai Chee; Chau Hoi Wah	Yohan Hadikusumo Wiratama; Chau Hoi Wah
2009	Hu Yun	Chan Tsz Ka	Albertus Susanto Njoto; Hui Wai Ho	Chan Tsz Ka; Tse Ying Suet	Yohan Hadikusumo Wiratama; Chau Hoi Wah
2010	Hu Yun	Yip Pui Yin	Yohan Hadikusumo Wiratama; Wong Wai Hong	Chan Tsz Ka; Chau Hoi Wah	Wong Wai Hong; Chau Hoi Wah
2011	Wong Wing Ki	Chan Tsz Ka	Albertus Susanto Njoto; Yohan Hadikusumo Wiratama	Poon Lok Yan; Tse Ying Suet	Yohan Hadikusumo Wiratama; Koon Wai Chee
2012	Hu Yun	Yip Pui Yin	Albertus Susanto Njoto; Yohan Hadikusumo Wiratama	Poon Lok Yan; Tse Ying Suet	Hu Yun; Chan Hung Yung
2013	Wong Wing Ki	Chan Tsz Ka	Albertus Susanto Njoto; Yohan Hadikusumo Wiratama	Poon Lok Yan; Tse Ying Suet	Chan Yun Lung; Tse Ying Suet
2014	Wei Nan	Yip Pui Yin	Lo Lok Kei; Fernando Kurniawan	Chan Tsz Ka; Tse Ying Suet	Chan Yun Lung; Tse Ying Suet
2015	Wong Wing Ki	Cheung Ngan Yi	Tang Chun Man; Or Chin Chung	Yuen Sin Ying; Chan Tsz Ka	Chan Yun Lung; Tse Ying Suet
2016	Lee Cheuk Yiu	Cheung Ngan Yi	Tang Chun Man; Or Chin Chung	Yuen Sin Ying; Chan Tsz Ka	Lee Chun Hei; Chau Hoi Wah
2017	Wong Wing Ki	Cheung Ngan Yi	Tang Chun Man; Or Chin Chung	Ng Tsz Yau; Yeung Nga Ting	Lee Chun Hei; Chau Hoi Wah
2018	Ng Ka Long	Yip Pui Yin	Lee Cheuk Yiu; Chan Yin Chak	Ng Wing Yung; Yeung Nga Ting	Chang Tak Ching; Ng Wing Yung
2019	Ng Ka Long	Cheung Ngan Yi	Or Chin Chung; Mak Hee Chun	Ng Wing Yung; Yeung Nga Ting	Tang Chun Man; Tse Ying Suet
2020	Jason Gunawan	Deng Xuan	Lee Chun Hei; Tam Chun Hei	Ng Tsz Yau; Yuen Sin Ying	Tang Chun Man; Tse Ying Suet
2021	Chan Yin Chak	Saloni Samirbhai Mehta	Chang Tak Ching; Yeung Ming Nok	Yeung Nga Ting; Ng Wing Yung	Tang Chun Man; Tse Ying Suet
2022	Chan Yin Chak	Liang Ka Wing	Tang Chun Man; Ho Wai Lun	Fan Ka Yan; Yau Mau Ying	Lee Chun Hei; Ng Tsz Yau
2023	Chan Yin Chak	Yeung Sum Yee	Lee Chun Hei; Tang Chun Man	Ng Wing Yung; Lui Lok Lok	Tang Chun Man; Tse Ying Suet
2024	Jason Gunawan	Saloni Samirbhai Mehta	Hung Kuei Chun; Lui Chun Wai	Yeung Nga Ting; Yeung Pui Lam	Tang Chun Man; Tse Ying Suet
2025	Chan Yin Chak	Ip Sum Yau	Chan Yin Chak; Chow Hin Long	Lui Lok Lok; Tsang Hiu Yan	Tang Chun Man; Tse Ying Suet
