= 2008 Macau Open Grand Prix Gold =

Tournament details
- Dates: 30 September–5 October 2008
- Edition: 3
- Level: Grand Prix Gold
- Total prize money: US$120,000
- Venue: Tap Seac Multi-sports Pavilion
- Location: Macau

Champions
- Men's singles: (Indonesia) Taufik Hidayat
- Women's singles: (Hong Kong) Zhou Mi
- Men's doubles: (Malaysia) Koo Kien Keat (Malaysia) Tan Boon Heong
- Women's doubles: (China) Cheng Shu (China) Zhao Yunlei
- Mixed doubles: (China) Xu Chen (China) Zhao Yunlei

The 2008 Macau Open Grand Prix Gold was a badminton tournament which took place at the Tap Seac Multi-sports Pavilion, Macau on 30 September to 5 October 2008 and had a total purse of $120,000.

== Men's singles ==
=== Seeds ===
1. (Malaysia) Lee Chong Wei (final)
2. (China) Bao Chunlai (withdrew)
3. (China) Chen Jin (withdrew)
4. (Indonesia) Taufik Hidayat (champion)
5. (Indonesia) Simon Santoso (withdrew)
6. (Malaysia) Wong Choong Hann (quarterfinals)
7. (England) Andrew Smith (third round)
8. (Hong Kong) Chan Yan Kit (quarterfinals)
9. (Hong Kong) Ng Wei (third round)
10. (Vietnam) Nguyễn Tiến Minh (third round)
11. (Singapore) Kendrick Lee (second round)
12. (Malaysia) Muhammad Hafiz Hashim (withdrew)
13. (Netherlands) Eric Pang (first round)
14. (Thailand) Tanongsak Saensomboonsuk (third round)
15. (China) Chen Hong (quarterfinals)
16. (Malaysia) Chong Wei Feng (third round)

=== Finals ===
Quarterfinals
1	(Malaysia) Lee Chong Wei	w	/	o
15	(China) Chen Hong
(Indonesia) Alamsyah Yunus	21	21
8	(Hong Kong) Chan Yan Kit	17	18
(Indonesia) Tommy Sugiarto	21	15
4	(Indonesia) Taufik Hidayat	23	21
6	(Malaysia) Wong Choong Hann	16	21	11
(Malaysia) Kuan Beng Hong	21	17	21

Semifinals
1	(Malaysia) Lee Chong Wei	21	21
(Indonesia) Alamsyah Yunus	13	14
4	(Indonesia) Taufik Hidayat	21	21
(Malaysia) Kuan Beng Hong	11	12

Final
1	(Malaysia) Lee Chong Wei	19	15
4	(Indonesia) Taufik Hidayat	21	21

== Women's singles ==
=== Seeds ===
1. (Malaysia) Wong Mew Choo (second round)
2. (Hong Kong) Wang Chen (withdrew)
3. (Hong Kong) Zhou Mi (champion)
4. (Hong Kong) Yip Pui Yin (semifinals)
5. (Indonesia) Maria Kristin Yulianti (withdrew)
6. (Netherlands) Yao Jie (second round)
7. (China) Jiang Yanjiao (withdrew)
8. (Malaysia) Julia Wong Pei Xian (final)

=== Finals ===
Semifinals
(China) Zhu Jingjing	22	18	16
3	(Hong Kong) Zhou Mi	20	21	21
4	(Hong Kong) Yip Pui Yin	21	21	17
8	(Malaysia) Julia Wong Pei Xian	17	23	21

Final
3	(Hong Kong) Zhou Mi	21	21
8	(Malaysia) Julia Wong Pei Xian	13	19

== Men's doubles ==
=== Seeds ===
1. (Malaysia) Koo Kien Keat / Tan Boon Heong (champion)
2. (Chinese Taipei) Fang Chieh-min / Lee Sheng-mu (final)
3. (Malaysia) Chan Chong Ming / Chew Choon Eng (semifinals)
4. (Indonesia) Fernando Kurniawan / Lingga Lie (semifinals)
5. (China) He Hanbin / Shen Ye (second round)
6. (China) Sun Junjie / Xu Chen (quarterfinals)
7. (Singapore) Hendra Wijaya / Yoga Ukikasah (withdrew)
8. (Hong Kong) Lo Lok Kei / Albertus Susanto Njoto (first round)

=== Finals ===
Semifinals
1	(Malaysia) Koo Kien Keat (Malaysia) Tan Boon Heong	21	25
4	(Indonesia) Fernando Kurniawan (Indonesia) Lingga Lie	14	23
3	(Malaysia) Chan Chong Ming (Malaysia) Chew Choon Eng	18	21	11
2	(Chinese Taipei) Fang Chieh-min (Chinese Taipei) Lee Sheng-mu	21	14	21

Final
1	(Malaysia) Koo Kien Keat (Malaysia) Tan Boon Heong	21	21
2	(Chinese Taipei) Fang Chieh-min (Chinese Taipei) Lee Sheng-mu	16	18

== Women's doubles ==
=== Seeds ===
1. (Malaysia) Fong Chew Yen / Mooi Hing Yau (quarterfinals)
2. (Singapore) Shinta Mulia Sari / Yao Lei (quarterfinals)
3. (Germany) Nicole Grether / (Canada) Charmaine Reid (quarterfinals)
4. (Hong Kong) Mong Kwan Yi / Ng Ka Shun (second round)

=== Finals ===
Semifinals
(China) Ma Jin (China) Wang Xiaoli	21	21
(Malaysia) Ng Hui Lin (Malaysia) Woon Khe Wei	12	12
(China) Wang Siyun (China) Zhang Jinkang	21	17	19
(China) Cheng Shu (China) Zhao Yunlei	18	21	21

Final
(China) Ma Jin (China) Wang Xiaoli	15	18
(China) Cheng Shu (China) Zhao Yunlei	21	21

== Mixed doubles ==
=== Seeds ===
1. (Hong Kong) Yohan Hadikusumo Wiratama / Chau Hoi Wah (final)
2. (Indonesia) Tontowi Ahmad / Yulianti (second round)
3. (Malaysia) Chan Peng Soon / Amelia Alicia Anscelly (second round)
4. (Chinese Taipei) Wang Chia-min / Wang Pei-rong (semifinals)
5. (Hong Kong) Lo Lok Kei / Ng Ka Shun (first round)
5. (Indonesia) Anggun Nugroho / Lita Nurlita (withdrew)
6. (Hong Kong) Leung Chun Yiu / Mong Kwan Yi (first round)
6. (Malaysia) Lim Khim Wah / Woon Khe Wei (quarterfinals)
7. (Singapore) Chayut Triyachart / Yao Lei (quarterfinals)
8. (Chinese Taipei) Fang Chieh-min / Liu Shu-chih (first round)

=== Finals ===
Semifinals
1	(Hong Kong) Yohan Hadikusumo Wiratama (Hong Kong) Chau Hoi Wah	21	21
(China) Chai Biao (China) Wang Xiaoli	15	14
4	(Chinese Taipei) Wang Chia-min (Chinese Taipei) Wang Pei-rong	15	17
(China) Xu Chen (China) Zhao Yunlei	21	21

Final
1	(Hong Kong) Yohan Hadikusumo Wiratama (Hong Kong) Chau Hoi Wah	15	16
(China) Xu Chen (China) Zhao Yunlei	21	21

Preceded by Chinese Taipei Open	BWF Grand Prix Gold and Grand Prix; 2008 season	Succeeded by Bitburger Open
