= Jason Gunawan =

Hong Kong badminton player (born 2004)

Jason Gunawan 吳英倫
Personal information
- Born: 18 June 2004 (age 22) Hong Kong
- Height: 1.80 m (5 ft 11 in)

Sport
- Country: Hong Kong
- Sport: Badminton
- Handedness: Right
- Coached by: Wong Choong Hann

Men's singles
- Highest ranking: 20 (10 November 2026)
- Current ranking: 20 (10 November 2026)
- BWF profile

Jason Gunawan (Chinese: 吳英倫; pinyin: Wú Yīnglún; Jyutping: ng4 jing1 leon4; born 18 June 2004) is a badminton player from Hong Kong.

== Biography ==
Gunawan was born on 18 June 2004 in Hong Kong, to Chinese-Indonesian parents. His father played for the provincial badminton team when he was in Indonesia. He became interested in badminton and started learning the sport at four years old after watching the Lee-Lin rivalry during the 2008 Beijing Olympics. As a child, he and his father would go to the local sports center every Sunday to practice, and he eventually made the Hong Kong junior badminton team. Gunawan attended Diocesan Boys' School, and won the Jing Ying All-School competition twice in a row. He dropped out in Form 4 to train as a full-time athlete at the Hong Kong Sports Institute. Three months later, he won the men's singles event at the 2020 National Championships, becoming the youngest player to do so at the age of 16. However, the Sports Institute was eventually shut down due to the COVID-19 pandemic, forcing Gunawan to take a three-year hiatus from training and only return to competitive sports in May 2022.

== Achievements ==
=== BWF World Tour (2 titles, 1 runner-up) ===
The BWF World Tour, which was announced on 19 March 2017 and implemented in 2018, is a series of elite badminton tournaments sanctioned by the Badminton World Federation (BWF). The BWF World Tours are divided into levels of World Tour Finals, Super 1000, Super 750, Super 500, Super 300 (part of the HSBC World Tour), and the BWF Tour Super 100.

Men's singles
Year	Tournament	Level	Opponent	Score	Result
2025	Syed Modi International	Super 300	(India) Srikanth Kidambi	21–16, 8–21, 22–20	(gold) Winner
2026	China Masters	Super 750	(Hong Kong) Lee Cheuk Yiu	21–9, 21–16	(gold) Winner
2026	Korea Open	Super 500	(Canada) Victor Lai	11–21, 14–21	(silver) Runner-up
