= Kim Astrup =

Danish badminton player (born 1992)

Personal information
- Born: Kim Astrup Sørensen; 6 March 1992 (age 34) Herning, Denmark
- Height: 1.85 m (6 ft 1 in)

Sport
- Country: Denmark
- Sport: Badminton
- Handedness: Left

Men's & mixed doubles
- Highest ranking: 1 (MD with Anders Skaarup Rasmussen, 17 December 2024); 32 (XD with Line Kjærsfeldt, 13 April 2017)
- Current ranking: 24 (MD with Anders Skaarup Rasmussen, 3 November 2026)
- BWF profile
Medal record
Men's badminton
Representing Denmark
World Championships
Silver medal – second place	2023 Copenhagen	Men's doubles
Bronze medal – third place	2021 Huelva	Men's doubles
Bronze medal – third place	2025 Paris	Men's doubles
Thomas Cup
Gold medal – first place	2016 Kunshan	Men's team
Bronze medal – third place	2018 Bangkok	Men's team
Bronze medal – third place	2020 Aarhus	Men's team
Bronze medal – third place	2022 Bangkok	Men's team
Bronze medal – third place	2026 Horsens	Men's team
European Games
Gold medal – first place	2023 Kraków–Małopolska	Men's doubles
Silver medal – second place	2019 Minsk	Men's doubles
European Championships
Gold medal – first place	2018 Huelva	Men's doubles
Gold medal – first place	2024 Saarbrücken	Men's doubles
Silver medal – second place	2016 La Roche-sur-Yon	Men's doubles
Bronze medal – third place	2017 Kolding	Men's doubles
Bronze medal – third place	2021 Kyiv	Men's doubles
European Mixed Team Championships
Gold medal – first place	2015 Leuven	Mixed team
Gold medal – first place	2019 Copenhagen	Mixed team
Gold medal – first place	2021 Vantaa	Mixed team
Gold medal – first place	2023 Aire-sur-la-Lys	Mixed team
Gold medal – first place	2025 Baku	Mixed team
European Men's Team Championships
Gold medal – first place	2014 Basel	Men's team
Gold medal – first place	2016 Kazan	Men's team
Gold medal – first place	2018 Kazan	Men's team
Gold medal – first place	2020 Liévin	Men's team
Gold medal – first place	2024 Łódź	Men's team
Silver medal – second place	2026 Istanbul	Men's team
World Junior Championships
Bronze medal – third place	2010 Guadalajara	Boys' doubles
European Junior Championships
Gold medal – first place	2011 Vantaa	Mixed doubles
Bronze medal – third place	2011 Vantaa	Boys' doubles
Bronze medal – third place	2011 Vantaa	Mixed team

Kim Astrup Sørensen (born 6 March 1992) is a Danish badminton player. He was the men's doubles gold medalists at the 2018 European Championships and the 2023 European Games with his partner Anders Skaarup Rasmussen. He also won the bronze medal at the World Championships in 2021 and later a silver medal in 2023. Astrup joined the Denmark winning team at the 2016 Thomas Cup in Kunshan, China, where he and his teammates beating Indonesia 3–2 in the final. Together with Rasmussen, he reached a career high of World number 1 in December 2024.

As junior player, Astrup won the bronze medal at the 2010 World Junior Championships in the boys' doubles. He later won a gold in the mixed doubles and bronze medals in the boys' doubles and team events at the 2011 European Junior Championships.

== Career ==
Astrup picked up a badminton racquet when he was 8 years old in Videbæk, Denmark. He enjoys the sport and continues to train intensely every day. He realized he had talent and pursued that dream through badminton. At the age of 18, he was entrusted to be part of the Danish junior team to compete at the 2010 World Junior Championships in Guadalajara, Mexico. Partnered with Rasmus Fladberg, he won the boys' doubles bronze medal. At the 2011 European Junior Championships in Vantaa, Finland, he won three medals. He managed to win the mixed doubles gold with Line Kjærsfeldt, and also bronze medals in the mixed doubles and team events. Despite his young age, Astrup has also made his mark in the senior level. In 2011, he won two men's doubles titles at the Swedish Masters and Croatian International, as well as a mixed doubles title at the Scottish International.

Unfortunately in 2012, Astrup was unable to win a single title. He was only being able to reach the mixed doubles final at the Denmark International tournament with Kjærsfeldt. At last, the Astrup Fladberg and Astrup Kjærsfeldt partnerships came to an end, since his partners will focused on single event. He made a new partnership with Anders Skaarup Rasmussen in the men's doubles and with Maria Helsbøl in the mixed doubles. Astrup and Rasmussen made it to 6 finals including two Grand Prix in the Bitburger Open in Germany and Scottish Open tournaments, and also won 2 Continental circuits in the Portugal and Belgian International. Meanwhile, Astrup and Helsbøl were finalists in 2 tournaments, Denmark and Kharkiv International.

In 2016, Astrup joined the Denmark winning team at the 2016 Thomas Cup in Kunshan, China, where he and his teammates beating Indonesia 3–2 in the final.

In 2018, Astrup emerge victorious in the men's doubles at the European Championships. In the final, Astrup and Anders Skaarup Rasmussen received an easy win to their compatriot Mads Conrad-Petersen and Mads Pieler Kolding, after Kolding had to withdraw due to abdominal injury before going into the second game. In September, Astrup and Rasmussen claimed their first ever BWF World Tour Super 1000 title in the China Open after beating host pair Han Chengkai and Zhou Haodong in the final. Their victory at that tournament, led them up to 5th place in the BWF ranking.

Astrup competed at the 2019 European Games, and won the silver medal in the men's doubles with Anders Skaarup Rasmussen.

Astrup competed at the 2020 Summer Olympics in the men's doubles partnering Anders Skaarup Rasmussen. The duo were eliminated in the quarter-finals to Li Junhui and Liu Yuchen.

At the 2021 World Championships, Astrup and Rasmussen won the bronze medal. The duo were defeated in the semi-finals by the Chinese pair He Jiting and Tan Qiang,

In 2023, Astrup managed to win the gold medal at the European Games with his partner Rasmussen. As the first seed, they beat the second seeded pair from Great Britain Ben Lane and Sean Vendy in a tight match. At the BWF World Championships, he and his partner then upgraded the bronze to silver that they won in 2021, after battling the final match in Royal Arena against the rising Korean pair Kang Min-hyuk and Seo Seung-jae which ended in defeat in a close rubber game.

== Achievements ==
=== World Championships ===
Men's doubles
Year	Venue	Partner	Opponent	Score	Result
2021	Palacio de los Deportes Carolina Marín; Huelva, Spain	(Denmark) Anders Skaarup Rasmussen	(China) He Jiting (China) Tan Qiang	16–21, 21–13, 15–21	Bronze
2023	Royal Arena; Copenhagen, Denmark	(Denmark) Anders Skaarup Rasmussen	(South Korea) Kang Min-hyuk (South Korea) Seo Seung-jae	21–14, 15–21, 17–21	Silver
2025	Adidas Arena; Paris, France	(Denmark) Anders Skaarup Rasmussen	(South Korea) Kim Won-ho (South Korea) Seo Seung-jae	12–21, 3–21	Bronze

=== European Games ===
Men's doubles
Year	Venue	Partner	Opponent	Score	Result
2019	Falcon Club; Minsk, Belarus	(Denmark) Anders Skaarup Rasmussen	(United Kingdom) Marcus Ellis (United Kingdom) Chris Langridge	17–21, 10–21	Silver
2023	Arena Jaskółka; Tarnów, Poland	(Denmark) Anders Skaarup Rasmussen	(United Kingdom) Ben Lane (United Kingdom) Sean Vendy	21–15, 19–21, 21–19	Gold

=== European Championships ===
Men's doubles
Year	Venue	Partner	Opponent	Score	Result
2016	Vendéspace; La Roche-sur-Yon, France	(Denmark) Anders Skaarup Rasmussen	(Denmark) Mads Conrad-Petersen (Denmark) Mads Pieler Kolding	21–14, 18–21, 13–21	Silver
2017	Sydbank Arena; Kolding, Denmark	(Denmark) Anders Skaarup Rasmussen	(Denmark) Mads Conrad-Petersen (Denmark) Mads Pieler Kolding	17–21, 22–24	Bronze
2018	Palacio de los Deportes Carolina Marín; Huelva, Spain	(Denmark) Anders Skaarup Rasmussen	(Denmark) Mads Conrad-Petersen (Denmark) Mads Pieler Kolding	21–15, retired	Gold
2021	Palace of Sports; Kyiv, Ukraine	(Denmark) Anders Skaarup Rasmussen	(Germany) Mark Lamsfuß (Germany) Marvin Seidel	21–23, 17–21	Bronze
2024	Saarlandhalle; Saarbrücken, Germany	(Denmark) Anders Skaarup Rasmussen	(Denmark) Andreas Søndergaard (Denmark) Jesper Toft	21–16, 21–15	Gold

=== BWF World Junior Championships ===
Boys' doubles
Year	Venue	Partner	Opponent	Score	Result
2010	Domo del Code Jalisco; Guadalajara, Mexico	(Denmark) Rasmus Fladberg	(Malaysia) Ow Yao Han (Malaysia) Yew Hong Kheng	16–21, 25–27	Bronze

=== European Junior Championships ===
Boys' doubles
Year	Venue	Partner	Opponent	Score	Result
2011	Energia Areena; Vantaa, Finland	(Denmark) Rasmus Fladberg	(England) Chris Coles (England) Matthew Nottingham	17–21, 17–21	Bronze

Mixed doubles
Year	Venue	Partner	Opponent	Score	Result
2011	Energia Areena; Vantaa, Finland	(Denmark) Line Kjærsfeldt	(England) Matthew Nottingham (England) Helena Lewczynska	19–21, 21–14, 21–16	Gold

=== BWF World Tour (10 titles, 6 runners-up) ===
The BWF World Tour, which was announced on 19 March 2017 and implemented in 2018, is a series of elite badminton tournaments sanctioned by the Badminton World Federation (BWF). The BWF World Tour is divided into levels of World Tour Finals, Super 1000, Super 750, Super 500, Super 300, and the BWF Tour Super 100.

Men's doubles
Year	Tournament	Level	Partner	Opponent	Score	Result
2018	India Open	Super 500	(Denmark) Anders Skaarup Rasmussen	(Indonesia) Marcus Fernaldi Gideon (Indonesia) Kevin Sanjaya Sukamuljo	14–21, 16–21	(silver) Runner-up
2018	China Open	Super 1000	(Denmark) Anders Skaarup Rasmussen	(China) Han Chengkai (China) Zhou Haodong	21–13, 17–21, 21–14	(gold) Winner
2020	Spain Masters	Super 300	(Denmark) Anders Skaarup Rasmussen	(Chinese Taipei) Lee Yang (Chinese Taipei) Wang Chi-lin	21–17, 21–19	(gold) Winner
2021	Swiss Open	Super 300	(Denmark) Anders Skaarup Rasmussen	(Germany) Mark Lamsfuß (Germany) Marvin Seidel	21–16, 21–11	(gold) Winner
2021	Denmark Open	Super 1000	(Denmark) Anders Skaarup Rasmussen	(Japan) Takuro Hoki (Japan) Yugo Kobayashi	18–21, 12–21	(silver) Runner-up
2022	Japan Open	Super 750	(Denmark) Anders Skaarup Rasmussen	(China) Liang Weikeng (China) Wang Chang	18–21, 21–13, 17–21	(silver) Runner-up
2023	Canada Open	Super 500	(Denmark) Anders Skaarup Rasmussen	(Denmark) Rasmus Kjær (Denmark) Frederik Søgaard	23–25, 21–16, 21–12	(gold) Winner
2023	Hong Kong Open	Super 500	(Denmark) Anders Skaarup Rasmussen	(Indonesia) Leo Rolly Carnando (Indonesia) Daniel Marthin	21–10, 22–24, 21–19	(gold) Winner
2023	Arctic Open	Super 500	(Denmark) Anders Skaarup Rasmussen	(Malaysia) Man Wei Chong (Malaysia) Tee Kai Wun	21–18, 21–17	(gold) Winner
2023	French Open	Super 750	(Denmark) Anders Skaarup Rasmussen	(Indonesia) Muhammad Shohibul Fikri (Indonesia) Bagas Maulana	21–14, 10–21, 21–18	(gold) Winner
2024	Indonesia Masters	Super 500	(Denmark) Anders Skaarup Rasmussen	(Indonesia) Leo Rolly Carnando (Indonesia) Daniel Marthin	12–21, 22–20, 11–21	(silver) Runner-up
2024	Malaysia Masters	Super 500	(Denmark) Anders Skaarup Rasmussen	(South Korea) Jin Yong (South Korea) Na Sung-seung	21–18, 21–14	(gold) Winner
2024	Canada Open	Super 500	(Denmark) Anders Skaarup Rasmussen	(England) Ben Lane (England) Sean Vendy	18–21, 21–14, 21–11	(gold) Winner
2024	Arctic Open	Super 500	(Denmark) Anders Skaarup Rasmussen	(Malaysia) Goh Sze Fei (Malaysia) Nur Izzuddin	21–15, 15–21, 19–21	(silver) Runner-up
2024	Denmark Open	Super 750	(Denmark) Anders Skaarup Rasmussen	(China) Liang Weikeng (China) Wang Chang	18–21, 17–21	(silver) Runner-up
2024	BWF World Tour Finals	World Tour Finals	(Denmark) Anders Skaarup Rasmussen	(Malaysia) Goh Sze Fei (Malaysia) Nur Izzuddin	21–17, 17–21, 21–11	(gold) Winner

=== BWF Grand Prix (3 titles, 3 runners-up) ===
The BWF Grand Prix had two levels, the Grand Prix and Grand Prix Gold. It was a series of badminton tournaments sanctioned by the Badminton World Federation (BWF) and played between 2007 and 2017.

Men's doubles
Year	Tournament	Partner	Opponent	Score	Result
2013	Bitburger Open	(Denmark) Anders Skaarup Rasmussen	(Denmark) Mads Conrad-Petersen (Denmark) Mads Pieler Kolding	11–21, 16–21	(silver) Runner-up
2013	Scottish Open	(Denmark) Anders Skaarup Rasmussen	(Denmark) Mads Conrad-Petersen (Denmark) Mads Pieler Kolding	Walkover	(silver) Runner-up
2014	Bitburger Open	(Denmark) Anders Skaarup Rasmussen	(China) Wang Yilyu (China) Zhang Wen	14–21, 10–21	(silver) Runner-up
2016	Swiss Open	(Denmark) Anders Skaarup Rasmussen	(Chinese Taipei) Lee Sheng-mu (Chinese Taipei) Tsai Chia-hsin	21–8, 21–15	(gold) Winner
2017	German Open	(Denmark) Anders Skaarup Rasmussen	(Denmark) Mads Conrad-Petersen (Denmark) Mads Pieler Kolding	21–17, 21–13	(gold) Winner
2017	Bitburger Open	(Denmark) Anders Skaarup Rasmussen	(Indonesia) Fajar Alfian (Indonesia) Muhammad Rian Ardianto	21–19, 19–21, 21–18	(gold) Winner

BWF Grand Prix Gold tournament
BWF Grand Prix tournament

=== BWF International Challenge/Series (7 titles, 7 runners-up) ===
Men's doubles
Year	Tournament	Partner	Opponent	Score	Result
2011	Swedish Masters	(Denmark) Rasmus Fladberg	(Poland) Łukasz Moreń (Poland) Wojciech Szkudlarczyk	14–21, 25–23, 21–16	(gold) Winner
2011	Croatian International	(Denmark) Rasmus Fladberg	(Denmark) Niclas Nøhr (Denmark) Mads Pedersen	18–21, 21–19, 21–16	(gold) Winner
2013	Portugal International	(Denmark) Anders Skaarup Rasmussen	(England) Peter Briggs (England) Harley Towler	21–18, 21–14	(gold) Winner
2013	Denmark International	(Denmark) Anders Skaarup Rasmussen	(England) Marcus Ellis (Scotland) Paul van Rietvelde	23–25, 21–16, 19–21	(silver) Runner-up
2013	Kharkiv International	(Denmark) Anders Skaarup Rasmussen	(Poland) Adam Cwalina (Poland) Przemysław Wacha	20–22, 21–15, 12–21	(silver) Runner-up
2013	Belgian International	(Denmark) Anders Skaarup Rasmussen	(England) Chris Langridge (England) Peter Mills	28–26, 21–18	(gold) Winner
2014	Finnish Open	(Denmark) Anders Skaarup Rasmussen	(Chinese Taipei) Huang Po-jui (Chinese Taipei) Lu Ching-yao	21–18, 21–17	(gold) Winner
2015	Swedish Masters	(Denmark) Anders Skaarup Rasmussen	(Poland) Adam Cwalina (Poland) Przemysław Wacha	21–15, 21–11	(gold) Winner
2016	Swedish Masters	(Denmark) Anders Skaarup Rasmussen	(Denmark) Mathias Christiansen (Denmark) David Daugaard	19–21, 23–21, 19–21	(silver) Runner-up

Mixed doubles
Year	Tournament	Partner	Opponent	Score	Result
2011	Croatian International	(Denmark) Line Kjærsfeldt	(Croatia) Zvonimir Đurkinjak (Croatia) Staša Poznanović	13–21, 13–21	(silver) Runner-up
2011	Scottish International	(Denmark) Line Kjærsfeldt	(Poland) Wojciech Szkudlarczyk (Poland) Agnieszka Wojtkowska	15–21, 21–15, 21–13	(gold) Winner
2012	Denmark International	(Denmark) Line Kjærsfeldt	(Denmark) Mads Pieler Kolding (Denmark) Julie Houmann	19–21, 9–21	(silver) Runner-up
2013	Denmark International	(Denmark) Maria Helsbøl	(Denmark) Anders Skaarup Rasmussen (Denmark) Lena Grebak	16–21, 8–21	(silver) Runner-up
2013	Kharkiv International	(Denmark) Maria Helsbøl	(Scotland) Robert Blair (Scotland) Imogen Bankier	22–20, 9–21, 18–21	(silver) Runner-up

BWF International Challenge tournament
BWF International Series tournament

== Record against selected opponents ==
Men's doubles results with Anders Skaarup Rasmussen against Year-end Finals finalists, World Championships semi-finalists, and Olympic quarter-finalists. Accurate as of 13 August 2024.

Players	M	W	L	Diff.
(China) Chai Biao & Hong Wei	5	0	5	–1
(China) Fu Haifeng & Zhang Nan	2	1	1	0
(China) He Jiting & Tan Qiang	4	2	2	0
(China) Li Junhui & Liu Yuchen	9	1	8	–7
(China) Liang Weikeng & Wang Chang	4	1	3	–2
(China) Liu Cheng & Zhang Nan	2	0	2	–2
(China) Liu Xiaolong & Qiu Zihan	1	1	0	+1
(China) Liu Yuchen & Ou Xuanyi	7	3	4	–1
(Chinese Taipei) Chen Hung-ling & Wang Chi-lin	6	4	2	+2
(Chinese Taipei) Lee Yang & Wang Chi-lin	10	3	7	–4
(Denmark) Mathias Boe & Carsten Mogensen	1	0	1	–1
(England) Marcus Ellis & Chris Langridge	3	1	2	–1
(India) Satwiksairaj Rankireddy & Chirag Shetty	9	6	3	+3
(Indonesia) Mohammad Ahsan & Rian Agung Saputro	2	0	2	–2
(Indonesia) Mohammad Ahsan & Hendra Setiawan	10	3	7	–4
(Indonesia) Fajar Alfian & Muhammad Rian Ardianto	7	4	3	+1

Players	M	W	L	Diff.
(Indonesia) Marcus Fernaldi Gideon & Kevin Sanjaya Sukamuljo	10	1	9	–8
(Japan) Hiroyuki Endo & Kenichi Hayakawa	2	0	2	–2
(Japan) Hiroyuki Endo & Yuta Watanabe	5	2	3	–1
(Japan) Takuro Hoki & Yugo Kobayashi	13	6	7	–1
(Japan) Takeshi Kamura & Keigo Sonoda	10	4	6	–2
(Malaysia) Aaron Chia & Soh Wooi Yik	12	4	8	–4
(Malaysia) Goh V Shem & Tan Wee Kiong	5	2	3	–1
(Malaysia) Ong Yew Sin & Teo Ee Yi	4	2	2	0
(Russia) Vladimir Ivanov & Ivan Sozonov	10	8	2	+6
(South Korea) Kang Min-hyuk & Seo Seung-jae	3	2	1	+1
(South Korea) Kim Gi-jung & Kim Sa-rang	4	2	2	0
(South Korea) Ko Sung-hyun & Shin Baek-cheol	2	0	2	–2
(South Korea) Lee Yong-dae & Yoo Yeon-seong	5	0	5	–5
(Thailand) Bodin Isara & Maneepong Jongjit	1	0	1	–1
(Thailand) Supak Jomkoh & Kittinupong Kedren	4	3	1	+2
