= Fladberg =

Fladberg is a Danish surname. Notable people with the surname include:

- Rasmus Fladberg (born 1992), Danish badminton player
- Steen Fladberg (born 1956), Danish badminton player
