= Iran Fajr International =

Badminton championships

The Iran Fajr International in badminton is an international open held in Tehran, Iran and a part of the Fajr decade festival. This is one of the oldest tournaments in the Western Asia which was formerly known as Ten Days of Dawn in commemoration of the 1979 Islamic Revolution, a ten-day celebration of Ruhollah Khomeini's return to Iran.

== Previous winners ==
=== Iran Fajr International ===
Year	Men's singles	Women's singles	Men's doubles	Women's doubles	Mixed doubles	Ref
1991	(China) Lin Liwen	No competition	(China) Huang Yi (China) Zhu Yonghong	No competition	No competition	
1992	(China) Sun Jun	No competition	(China) Sun Jun (China) Zeng Yu	No competition	No competition	
1993	(South Korea) Sung Han-kook	No competition	(South Korea) Kim Moon-soo (South Korea) Park Joo-bong	No competition	No competition	
1994	(Malaysia) Roslin Hashim	No competition	No data	No competition	No competition	
1995	(Malaysia) Ismail Saman	No competition	(Malaysia) Khoo Boo Hock (Malaysia) Lee Chee Leong	No competition	No competition	
1996	(China) Chen Hong	No competition	(China) Wu Changqing (China) Zhang Jun	No competition	No competition	
1997	(Iran) Morteza Validarvi	No competition	(Iran) Ali Reza Shafiee (Iran) Saed Bahador Zakizadeh	No competition	No competition	
1998	(Iran) Morteza Validarvi	(Kazakhstan) Saule Kustavletova	(Iran) Ali Reza Shafiee (Iran) Saed Bahador Zakizadeh	(Kazakhstan) Saule Kustavletova (Turkmenistan) Victoria Yefremova	No competition	
1999	(Iran) Saed Bahador Zakizadeh	(Azerbaijan) Nargiz Mekchtiyeva	(Iran) Ali Shahhosseini (Iran) Afshin Bozorgzadeh	(Azerbaijan) Nargiz Mekchtiyeva (Azerbaijan) Sevinghe Akchundova	No competition	
2000	Not held					
2001	(Japan) Shōji Satō	(Azerbaijan) Nargiz Mekchtiyeva	(Japan) Shōji Satō (Japan) Sho Sasaki	(Iran) Setayesh Afshordi (Iran) Behnaz Przamanbin	No competition	
2002	(Iran) Golam Reza Bagheri	(Iran) Behnaz Pirzamanbin	(Iran) Ali Shahhosseini (Iran) Farhad Soleimani	(Iran) Setayesh Afshordi (Iran) Behnaz Przamanbin	No competition	
2003	(Japan) Shōji Satō	(Kazakhstan) Saule Kustavletova	(Japan) Yuichi Ikeda (Japan) Shōji Satō	(Armenia) Ruzanna Hakobyan (Armenia) Anna Nazaryan	No competition	
2004	(Japan) Shōji Satō	(Singapore) Li Li	(Hong Kong) Liu Kwok Wa (Hong Kong) Albertus Susanto Njoto	(Singapore) Jiang Yanmei (Singapore) Li Yujia	No competition	
2005	(Singapore) Erwin Djohan	(Singapore) Li Li	(Singapore) Erwin Djohan (Singapore) Hendra Wijaya	(Singapore) Frances Liu (Singapore) Shinta Mulia Sari	No competition	
2006	(Pakistan) Wajid Ali Chaudhry	(Sweden) Behnaz Pirzamanbein	(Iran) Ali Shahhoseini (Iran) Golam Reza Bagheri	(Turkey) Gülcin Köse (Turkey) Nursel Aydoğmuş	No competition	
2007	(France) Nabil Lasmari	(Portugal) Ana Moura	(Iran) Ali Shahhoseini (Iran) Nikzad Shiri	(Iran) Negin Amiripour (Iran) Sahar Zamanian	No competition	
2008	(Malaysia) Mohamad Arif Abdul Latif	(Italy) Agnese Allegrini	(Malaysia) Mohamad Arif Abdul Latif (Malaysia) Indra Mawan Vountus	(Malaysia) Norshahliza Baharum (Malaysia) Lim Yin Loo	No competition	
2009	(Iran) Mohammad Reza Kheradmandi	(Turkey) Aprilsasi Putri Lejarsar Variella	(Iran) Mohammad Reza Kheradmandi (Iran) Ali Shahhosseini	(Turkey) Ezgi Epice (Turkey) Aprilsasi Putri Lejarsar Variella	No competition	
2010	(India) B. Sai Praneeth	(Japan) Rie Eto	(India) B. Sai Praneeth (India) Pranav Chopra	(Japan) Rie Eto (Japan) Yu Wakita	No competition	
2011	(Indonesia) Tommy Sugiarto	(Canada) Nicole Grether	(Malaysia) Mohd Razif Abdul Rahman (Malaysia) Mohd Razif Abdul Latif	(Sri Lanka) Achini Ratnasiri (Sri Lanka) Upuli Weerasinghe	No competition	
2012	(Sri Lanka) Niluka Karunaratne	(Turkey) Neslihan Yiğit	(Indonesia) Marcus Fernaldi Gideon (Indonesia) Agripina Prima Rahmanto Putra	(Japan) Rie Eto (Japan) Yu Wakita	No competition	
2013	(Indonesia) Riyanto Subagja	(Turkey) Neslihan Yiğit	(Indonesia) Wahyu Nayaka (Indonesia) Ade Yusuf Santoso	(Malaysia) Amelia Alicia Anscelly (Malaysia) Soong Fie Cho	No competition	
2014	(India) Sourabh Varma	(Malaysia) Tee Jing Yi	(Chinese Taipei) Chen Hung-ling (Chinese Taipei) Lu Chia-pin	(Malaysia) Amelia Alicia Anscelly (Malaysia) Soong Fie Cho	No competition	
2015	(Austria) David Obernosterer	(Bulgaria) Linda Zetchiri	(Malaysia) Tai An Khang (Malaysia) Yew Hong Kheng	(Turkey) Özge Bayrak (Turkey) Neslihan Yiğit	No competition	
2016	Cancelled					
2017	(Indonesia) Panji Ahmad Maulana	(Russia) Ksenia Polikarpova	(India) Arjun M. R. (India) Ramchandran Shlok	(Singapore) Ren-ne Ong (Singapore) Crystal Wong	No competition	
2018	(Vietnam) Phạm Cao Cường	(Malaysia) Thinaah Muralitharan	(India) Alwin Francis (India) K. Nandagopal	(Iran) Setayesh Abdolkarimi (Iran) Haleh Hamedanchi	No competition	
2019	(Thailand) Kunlavut Vitidsarn	(Thailand) Supanida Katethong	(Indonesia) Adnan Maulana (Indonesia) Ghifari Anandaffa Prihardika	(Indonesia) Nita Violina Marwah (Indonesia) Putri Syaikah	No competition	
2020	(Canada) Xiaodong Sheng	(United States) Crystal Pan	(Iran) Soroush Eskandari (Iran) Amir Jabbari	(Iran) Nasim Safaei (Iran) Hannaneh Yaghoubzadeh	No competition	
2021	Cancelled (Note: This tournament, originally to be played from 3 to 7 February, was later cancelled due to the COVID-19 pandemic in Iran.)					
2022	(India) Meiraba Maisnam	(India) Tasnim Mir	(Indonesia) Abiyyu Fauzan Majid (Indonesia) Ferdian Mahardika Ranialdy	(Russia) Ekaterina Malkova (Russia) Anastasiia Shapovalova	No competition	
2023	(Indonesia) Syabda Perkasa Belawa	(India) Tanya Hemanth	(Philippines) Christian Bernardo (Philippines) Alvin Morada	(Indonesia) Jesita Putri Miantoro (Indonesia) Febi Setianingrum	(Malaysia) Chen Tang Jie (Malaysia) Toh Ee Wei	
2024	(Vietnam) Nguyễn Hải Đăng	(Hong Kong) Lo Sin Yan	(India) Krishna Prasad Garaga (India) Sai Pratheek K.	(Brazil) Jaqueline Lima (Brazil) Sâmia Lima	(India) Sathish Karunakaran (India) Aadya Variyath	
2025	(India) Manraj Singh	(Turkey) Neslihan Arın	(India) M. R. Arjun (India) Vishnuvardhan Goud Panjala	(Bulgaria) Gabriela Stoeva (Bulgaria) Stefani Stoeva	(India) Ishaan Bhatnagar (India) Srinidhi Narayanan	
2026	Cancelled					

=== Iran International Future Series Khazar (Caspian) Cup ===
Year	Men's singles	Women's singles	Men's doubles	Women's doubles	Mixed doubles	Ref
2024	Cancelled					
2025	(Kazakhstan) Dmitriy Panarin	(Iran) Paria Eskandari	(Iran) Mehdi Ansari (Iran) Amirhossein Hasani	(Iran) Artina Aghapour Hasiri (Iran) Hana Molakarimi	(Kazakhstan) Dmitriy Panarin (Kazakhstan) Nargiza Rakhmetullayeva	
2026	Cancelled					

== Performances by nation ==
=== Iran Fajr International ===
As of the 2025 edition

Pos	Nation	MS	WS	MD	WD	XD	Total
1	Iran	5	1	8	5		19
2	India	4	2	5		2	13
2	Malaysia	3	2	4	3	1	13
4	Indonesia	4		4	2		10
5	Japan	3	1	2	2		8
6	Singapore	1	2	1	3		7
6	Turkey		4		3		7
8	China	3		3			6
9	Azerbaijan		2		1		3
10	Kazakhstan		2		0.5		2.5
11	Bulgaria		1		1		2
11	Canada	1	1				2
11	Hong Kong		1	1			2
11	Russia		1		1		2
11	South Korea	1		1			2
11	Sri Lanka	1			1		2
11	Thailand	1	1				2
11	Vietnam	2					2
19	Armenia				1		1
19	Austria	1					1
19	Brazil				1		1
19	Chinese Taipei			1			1
19	France	1					1
19	Italy		1				1
19	Pakistan	1					1
19	Philippines			1			1
19	Portugal		1				1
19	Sweden		1				1
19	United States		1				1
30	Turkmenistan				0.5		0.5
Total		32	25	31	25	3	116

=== Iran International Future Series Khazar (Caspian) Cup ===
As of 2025 edition

Pos	Nation	MS	WS	MD	WD	XD	Total
1	Iran		1	1	1		3
2	Kazakhstan	1				1	2
Total		1	1	1	1	1	5
