= 2010 BWF World Junior Championships – boys' doubles =

2010 BWF World Junior Championships boys' doubles
Tournament details
- Dates: 21 April 2010 – 25 April 2010
- Edition: 12th
- Level: International
- Venue: CODE Dome
- Location: Guadalajara, Mexico

The boys' doubles event for the 2010 BWF World Junior Championships was held between 21 April and 25 April. Ow Yao Han defended his title, this time with his new partner Yew Hong Kheng.

== Seeded ==
1. (South Korea) Choi Seung-Il / Kang Ji-Wook (quarter-final)
2. (Malaysia) Ow Yao Han / Yew Hong Kheng (champion)
3. (Malaysia) Nelson Heg Wei Keat / Teo Ee Yi (final)
4. (Indonesia) Jones Rafli Jansen / Dandi Prabudita (third round)
5. (China) Li Gen / Song Ziwei (third round)
6. (England) Chris Coles / Matthew Nottingham (quarter-final)
7. (Germany) Fabian Holzer / Max Schwenger (quarter-final)
8. (India) Sai Praneeth / Pranav Chopra (quarter-final)

== Draw ==
=== Finals ===
Semifinals
(Hong Kong) Lee Chun Hei (Hong Kong) Ng Ka Long | 21 | 15 | 11
3/4 | (Malaysia) Nelson Heg Wei Keat (Malaysia) Teo Ee Yi | 17 | 21 | 21
(Denmark) Kim Astrup (Denmark) Rasmus Fladberg | 16 | 25
2 | (Malaysia) Ow Yao Han (Malaysia) Yew Hong Kheng | 21 | 27

Final
3/4 | (Malaysia) Nelson Heg Wei Keat (Malaysia) Teo Ee Yi | 18 | 15
2 | (Malaysia) Ow Yao Han (Malaysia) Yew Hong Kheng | 21 | 21

==== Section 1 ====
First round
(Suriname) D Darmohoetomo (Suriname) I Djabar | 9 | 17
(Canada) H Wiebe (Canada) N Yakura | 21 | 21
(France) L Corvee (France) J Grosjean | 21 | 21
(Chinese Taipei) Hsie F-T (Chinese Taipei) Hsieh P-T | 19 | 13
(Puerto Rico) A Aviles (Puerto Rico) H Torres | 11 | 11
(United States) Z Lam (United States) M Lin | 21 | 21
(Hong Kong) Lee CH (Hong Kong) Ng KL | 21 | 21
(Mexico) J Castillo (Mexico) A Ocegueda | 16 | 16

Second round
1 | (South Korea) Choi S-I (South Korea) Kang J-W | 21 | 21
(Brazil) L dos Santos (Brazil) T Mantovani | 7 | 5
(Canada) H Wiebe (Canada) N Yakura | 22 | 15 | 19
(France) L Corvee (France) J Grosjean | 20 | 21 | 21
5/8 | (China) Li G (China) Song ZW | 13 | 21 | 21
(Russia) K Abramov (Russia) D Grachev | 21 | 6 | 18
(United States) Z Lam (United States) M Lin | 12 | 21 | 10
(Hong Kong) Lee CH (Hong Kong) Ng KL | 21 | 19 | 21

Third round
1 | (South Korea) Choi S-I (South Korea) Kang J-W | 21 | 21
(France) L Corvee (France) J Grosjean | 15 | 14
5/8 | (China) Li G (China) Song ZW | 18 | 9
(Hong Kong) Lee CH (Hong Kong) Ng KL | 21 | 21

Quarterfinal
1 | (South Korea) Choi S-I (South Korea) Kang J-W | 18 | 21 | 11
(Hong Kong) Lee CH (Hong Kong) Ng KL | 21 | 7 | 21

==== Section 2 ====
First round
(England) J Green (England) T Penty | 17 | 11
(Japan) H Takeuchi (Japan) Y Takeuchi | 21 | 21
(India) M Attri (India) P Kumar | 19 | 12
(Denmark) M Brodbaek (Denmark) N Overgaard | 21 | 21
(Austria) M Almer (Austria) D Trojan | 21 | 21
(Peru) G Duany (Peru) R Mini | 9 | 12
(Netherlands) J Middleburg (Netherlands) R Muns | 21 | 21
(South Africa) A Malan (South Africa) P Vijayanath | 12 | 6

Second round
3/4 | (Malaysia) N Heg (Malaysia) Teo EY | 21 | 21
(Singapore) Ngo YC (Singapore) Tan KH | 7 | 5
(Japan) H Takeuchi (Japan) Y Takeuchi | 21 | 21
(Denmark) M Brodbaek (Denmark) N Overgaard | 17 | 11
5/8 | (Germany) F Holzer (Germany) M Schwenger | 21 | 21
(Sri Lanka) D Kariyawasam (Sri Lanka) C Kukulage | 13 | 17
(Austria) M Almer (Austria) D Trojan | 22 | 18 | 18
(Netherlands) J Middleburg (Netherlands) R Muns | 20 | 21 | 21

Third round
3/4 | (Malaysia) N Heg (Malaysia) Teo EY | 23 | 21
(Japan) H Takeuchi (Japan) Y Takeuchi | 21 | 19
5/8 | (Germany) F Holzer (Germany) M Schwenger | 21 | 21
(Netherlands) J Middleburg (Netherlands) R Muns | 19 | 19

Quarterfinal
3/4 | (Malaysia) N Heg (Malaysia) Teo EY | 25 | 22
5/8 | (Germany) F Holzer (Germany) M Schwenger | 23 | 20

==== Section 3 ====
First round
(Germany) R Beck (Germany) P Lang | 21 | 21
(Guatemala) H Humblers (Guatemala) J Solis | 11 | 14
(South Korea) Jun B-C (South Korea) Jung K-H | 21 | 21
(Peru) P Aguilar (Peru) I De Vinatea | 7 | 9
(Thailand) W Ampunsuwan (Thailand) T Isriyanate | 21 | 21
(Brazil) I Ibrahim (Puerto Rico) A Roman | 9 | 10
(Turkey) E Lale (Turkey) R Ozturk | 19 | 9
(Denmark) K Astrup (Denmark) R Fladberg | 21 | 21

Second round
(Germany) R Beck (Germany) P Lang | 21 | 13 | 24
(South Korea) Jun B-C (South Korea) Jung K-H | 18 | 21 | 26
(Mexico) A Lopez (Mexico) J Mondragon | 5 | 4
5/8 | (England) C Coles (England) M Nottingham | 21 | 21
(Thailand) W Ampunsuwan (Thailand) T Isriyanate | 7 | 21 | 12
(Denmark) K Astrup (Denmark) R Fladberg | 21 | 16 | 21
(South Africa) J McManus (South Africa) J Mortimer | 8 | 9
3/4 | (Indonesia) J Jansen (Indonesia) D Prabudita | 21 | 21

Third round
(South Korea) Jun B-C (South Korea) Jung K-H | 18 | 14
5/8 | (England) C Coles (England) M Nottingham | 21 | 21
(Denmark) K Astrup (Denmark) R Fladberg | 21 | 21
3/4 | (Indonesia) J Jansen (Indonesia) D Prabudita | 17 | 16

Quarterfinal
5/8 | (England) C Coles (England) M Nottingham | 18 | 14
(Denmark) K Astrup (Denmark) R Fladberg | 21 | 21

==== Section 4 ====
First round
(Chinese Taipei) Huang P-J (Chinese Taipei) Lin C-Y | 21 | 21
(France) L Claerbout (Austria) V Vattanirappel | 15 | 12
(Japan) K Horiuchi (Japan) T Kotaka | 21 | 21
(Canada) N Choi (Canada) A Lau | 18 | 16
(Algeria) M Belarbi (Algeria) A Hamek | WO
(Singapore) Huang C (Singapore) Koh JY
(United States) Chan YH (United States) B Lum | 16 | 21 | 21
(Sri Lanka) M Ranasinghe (Sri Lanka) S Mudiyaselage | 21 | 16 | 17

Second round
(Chinese Taipei) Huang P-J (Chinese Taipei) Lin C-Y | 21 | 21
(Japan) K Horiuchi (Japan) T Kotaka | 15 | 13
(Jamaica) D Coke (Jamaica) A McNee | 13 | 5
5/8 | (India) S Praneeth (India) P Chopra | 21 | 21
(Singapore) Huang C (Singapore) Koh JY | 21 | 21
(United States) Chan YH (United States) B Lum | 12 | 14
(China) Chen ZF (China) Liu C | 17 | 12
2 | (Malaysia) Ow YH (Malaysia) Yew HK | 21 | 21

Third round
(Chinese Taipei) Huang P-J (Chinese Taipei) Lin C-Y | 22 | 21 | 14
5/8 | (India) S Praneeth (India) P Chopra | 24 | 14 | 21
(Singapore) Huang C (Singapore) Koh JY | 6 | 6
2 | (Malaysia) Ow YH (Malaysia) Yew HK | 21 | 21

Quarterfinal
5/8 | (India) S Praneeth (India) P Chopra | 15 | 21 | 10
2 | (Malaysia) Ow YH (Malaysia) Yew HK | 21 | 12 | 21
