= Albertus Susanto Njoto =

Indonesian badminton player

Personal information
- Born: 27 October 1976 (age 50)
- Height: 1.75 m (5 ft 9 in)

Sport
- Country: Hong Kong; Australia
- Sport: Badminton
- Handedness: Right

Men's doubles
- Highest ranking: 53 (17 December 2009)
- BWF profile
Medal record
Badminton
Representing Hong Kong
Asia Championships
Bronze medal – third place	2005 Hyderabad	Mixed doubles

Albertus Susanto Njoto (Chinese: 楊禮豐; born 27 October 1976) is a badminton player from Indonesia. He moved to Hong Kong due to tight competition in Indonesia. In Hong Kong, he partnered with another Indonesian, Yohan Hadikusumo Wiratama, in men's doubles. He won the men's doubles title at the Philippines Open in 2006, and also was the mixed doubles bronze medallist at the 2005 Asian Badminton Championships.

== Achievements ==
=== Asian Championships ===
Mixed doubles
Year	Venue	Partner	Opponent	Score	Result
2005	Gachibowli Indoor Stadium; Hyderabad, India	(Hong Kong) Li Wing Mui	(Thailand) Sudket Prapakamol (Thailand) Saralee Thungthongkam	4–15, 8–15	Bronze

=== BWF Grand Prix ===
The BWF Grand Prix has two levels, the Grand Prix and Grand Prix Gold. It is a series of badminton tournaments sanctioned by the Badminton World Federation (BWF) since 2007.

Men's doubles
Year	Tournament	Partner	Opponent	Score	Result
2007	New Zealand Open	(Hong Kong) Yohan Hadikusumo Wiratama	(Malaysia) Chan Chong Ming (Malaysia) Hoon Thien How	14–21, 22–20, 11–21	(silver) Runner-up
2006	Philippines Open	(Hong Kong) Yohan Hadikusumo Wiratama	(Indonesia) Hendra Aprida Gunawan (Indonesia) Joko Riyadi	18–21, 21–12, 21–19	(gold) Winner
2001	Hong Kong Open	(Hong Kong) Yau Kwun Yuen	(South Korea) Lee Dong-soo (South Korea) Yoo Yong-sung	1–7, 2–7, 3–7	(silver) Runner-up

BWF Grand Prix Gold tournament
BWF Grand Prix tournament

=== BWF International Challenge/Series/Satellite ===
Men's doubles
Year	Tournament	Partner	Opponent	Score	Result
2017	Sydney International	(Australia) Yohan Hadikusumo Wiratama	(Chinese Taipei) Chuang Pu-sheng (Chinese Taipei) Lin Yu-chieh	21–14, 21–6	(gold) Winner
2006	Vietnam Satellite	(Hong Kong) Yohan Hadikusumo Wiratama	(Thailand) Sudket Prapakamol (Thailand) Patapol Ngernsrisuk	16–21, 11–21	(silver) Runner-up
2004	Mauritius International	(Hong Kong) Liu Kwok Wa	(Japan) Keita Masuda (Japan) Tadashi Ohtsuka	11–15, 8–15	(silver) Runner-up
2004	Iran Fajr International	(Hong Kong) Liu Kwok Wa	(Japan) Keita Masuda (Japan) Tadashi Ohtsuka	15–4, 15–11	(gold) Winner
2004	Portugal International	(Hong Kong) Liu Kwok Wa	(England) Simon Archer (England) Robert Blair	9–15, 15–12, 7–15	(silver) Runner-up
2003	Australia International	(Hong Kong) Liu Kwok Wa	(Germany) Jochen Cassel (Germany) Joachim Tesche	15–4, 15–9	(gold) Winner
2000	Australia Capital International	(Hong Kong) Liu Kwok Wa	(Australia) David Bamford (Australia) Peter Blackburn	15–9, 15–3	(gold) Winner
2000	Waitakere International	(Hong Kong) Liu Kwok Wa	(Hong Kong) Ma Che Kong (Hong Kong) Yau Tsz Yuk	11–15, 9–15	(silver) Runner-up

Mixed doubles
Year	Tournament	Partner	Opponent	Score	Result
2000	Australia Capital International	(Hong Kong) Chan Mei Mei	(Japan) Yuzo Kubota (Japan) Haruko Matsuda	15–9, 15–13	(gold) Winner
2000	Waitakere International	(Hong Kong) Chan Mei Mei	(Canada) Mike Beres (Canada) Kara Solmundson	8–15, 15–11, 15–10	(gold) Winner

BWF International Challenge tournament
BWF International Series tournament
