= Liu Kwok Wa =

Hong Kong badminton player

Liu Kwok Wa 廖國華
Personal information
- Born: 15 February 1978 (age 48)
- Height: 173 cm (5 ft 8 in)

Sport
- Country: Hong Kong
- Sport: Badminton
- Handedness: Right

Doubles
- Highest ranking: 7
- BWF profile
Medal record
Men's badminton
Representing Hong Kong
Asian Championships
Bronze medal – third place	2003 Jakarta	Mixed doubles

Liu Kwok Wa (traditional Chinese: 廖國華; simplified Chinese: 廖国华; Cantonese Yale: liuh gwok wàh, Jyutping: liu6 gwok3 waa4; pinyin: Liú Guóhuá; born 15 February 1978) is a retired badminton player from Hong Kong.

== Achievements ==
=== Asian Championships ===
Mixed doubles
Year	Venue	Partner	Opponent	Score	Result
2003	Tennis Indoor Gelora Bung Karno; Jakarta, Indonesia	(Hong Kong) Koon Wai Chee	(Indonesia) Nova Widianto (Indonesia) Vita Marissa	6–15, 15–7, 5–15	Bronze

=== IBF International ===
Men's doubles
Year	Tournament	Partner	Opponent	Score	Result
2004	Mauritius International	(Hong Kong) Albertus Susanto Njoto	(Japan) Keita Masuda (Japan) Tadashi Ohtsuka	11–15, 8–15	(silver) Runner-up
2004	Iran Fajr International	(Hong Kong) Albertus Susanto Njoto	(Japan) Keita Masuda (Japan) Tadashi Ohtsuka	15–4, 15–11	(gold) Winner
2004	Portugal International	(Hong Kong) Albertus Susanto Njoto	(England) Simon Archer (England) Robert Blair	9–15, 15–12, 7–15	(silver) Runner-up
2003	Australia International	(Hong Kong) Albertus Susanto Njoto	(Germany) Joachim Tesche (Germany) Jochen Cassel	15–4, 15–9	(gold) Winner
2000	Vietnam Satellite	(Hong Kong) Wong Tsz Yin	(Chinese Taipei) Chen Yuan-ting (Chinese Taipei) Yu Chih-wei	15–11, 12–15, 15–10	(gold) Winner
2000	Waitakere International	(Hong Kong) Albertus Susanto Njoto	(Hong Kong) Ma Che Kong (Hong Kong) Yau Tsz Yuk	11–15, 9–15	(silver) Runner-up
2000	Australia International	(Hong Kong) Albertus Susanto Njoto	(Australia) Peter Blackburn (Australia) David Bamford	15–9, 15–3	(gold) Winner
1999	Argentina International	(Hong Kong) Cun Cun Harjono	(Hong Kong) Ma Che Kong (Hong Kong) Yau Tsz Yuk	6–15, 7–15	(silver) Runner-up
1999	Brazil São Paulo International	(Hong Kong) Cun Cun Harjono	(Hong Kong) Ma Che Kong (Hong Kong) Yau Tsz Yuk	14–17, 4–15	(silver) Runner-up
1997	New Zealand International	(Hong Kong) Ma Che Kong	(New Zealand) Jeremy Raines (New Zealand) Croydon Rutherford	15–11, 17–14	(gold) Winner
