= Yu Wakita =

Japanese badminton player (born 1984)

Personal information
- Born: 4 November 1984 (age 42) Gifu Prefecture, Japan

Sport
- Country: Japan
- Sport: Badminton

Women's singles & doubles
- Highest ranking: 98 (WS 18 March 2010); 13 (WD 27 January 2011)
- BWF profile
Medal record
Women's badminton
Representing Japan
Asian Junior Championships
Bronze medal – third place	2002 Kuala Lumpur	Girls' team

Yu Wakita (脇田 侑, Wakita Yū; born 4 November 1984) is a Japanese badminton player.

== Achievements ==
=== BWF Grand Prix (1 runner-up) ===
The BWF Grand Prix has two level such as Grand Prix and Grand Prix Gold. It is a series of badminton tournaments, sanctioned by Badminton World Federation (BWF) since 2007.

Women's doubles
Year	Tournament	Partner	Opponent	Score	Result	Ref.
2010	U.S. Open	(Japan) Rie Eto	(Chinese Taipei) Cheng Wen-hsing (Chinese Taipei) Chien Yu-chin	8–21, 20–22	(silver) Runner-up	

BWF Grand Prix Gold tournament

=== BWF International Challenge/Series (11 titles, 6 runners-up) ===
Women's singles
Year	Tournament	Opponent	Score	Result	Ref.
2008	Dutch International	(Ukraine) Larisa Griga	19–21, 19–21	(silver) Runner-up	
2012	Iran Fajr International	(Turkey) Neslihan Yiğit	16-21, 14–21	(silver) Runner-up	
2012	Maldives International	(Japan) Sayaka Takahashi	17-21, 16–21	(silver) Runner-up	

Women's doubles
Year	Tournament	Partner	Opponent	Score	Result	Ref.
2009	Malaysia International	(Japan) Rie Eto	(Malaysia) Chong Sook Chin (Malaysia) Woon Khe Wei	21–18, 21–11	(gold) Winner	
2010	Vietnam International	(Japan) Rie Eto	(South Korea) Jung Kyung-eun (South Korea) Yoo Hyun-young	16–21, 18–21	(silver) Runner-up	
2010	Lao International	(Japan) Rie Eto	(Thailand) Nandatheero Peranart (Thailand) Lerthiran Prangnuch	21–18, 21–8	(gold) Winner	
2010	Iran Fajr International	(Japan) Rie Eto	(Iran) Negin Amiripour (Iran) Sahar Zamanian	21–5, 21–12	(gold) Winner	
2010	Austrian International	(Japan) Rie Eto	(Japan) Naoko Fukuman (Japan) Minatsu Mitani	21–14, 21–10	(gold) Winner	
2011	Polish Open	(Japan) Rie Eto	(Japan) Kana Ito (Japan) Asumi Kugo	21–16, 21–9	(gold) Winner	
2011	Swedish International	(Japan) Rie Eto	(Denmark) Line Damkjær Kruse (Denmark) Marie Røpke	14–21, 16–21	(silver) Runner-up	
2012	Iran Fajr International	(Japan) Rie Eto	(Japan) Ayumi Tasaki (Japan) Seiko Yamada	21–15, 23–21	(gold) Winner	
2012	Osaka International	(Japan) Rie Eto	(Japan) Naoko Fukuman (Japan) Kurumi Yonao	21–18, 21–12	(gold) Winner	
2012	Maldives International	(Japan) Rie Eto	(Japan) Naoko Fukuman (Japan) Kurumi Yonao	18–21, 21–13, 21–23	(silver) Runner-up	
2013	Polish Open	(Japan) Rie Eto	(Japan) Yuki Anai (Japan) Yumi Murayama	21–11, 21–7	(gold) Winner	
2013	French International	(Japan) Rie Eto	(Malaysia) Amelia Alicia Anscelly (Malaysia) Soong Fie Cho	21–17, 21–17	(gold) Winner	
2013	Osaka International	(Japan) Rie Eto	(Japan) Yuriko Miki (Japan) Koharu Yonemoto	21–10, 21–13	(gold) Winner	
2013	Dutch International	(Japan) Rie Eto	(Scotland) Imogen Bankier (Bulgaria) Petya Nedelcheva	14–21, 21–18, 21–12	(gold) Winner	

BWF International Challenge tournament
