= Chan Yun Lung =

New Zealand badminton player

Chan Yun Lung 陳潤龍
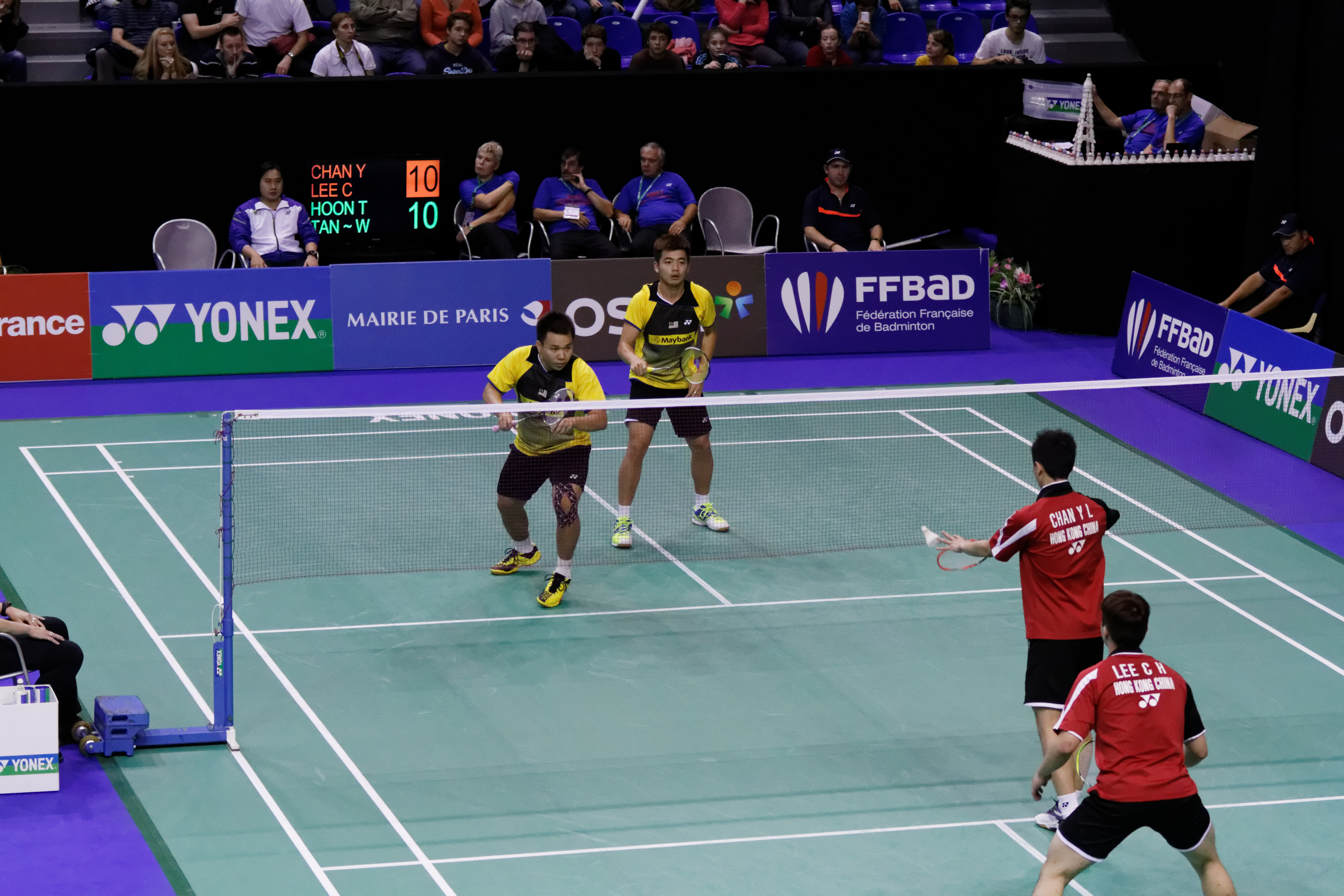

Personal information
- Born: 29 February 1988 (age 38) Hong Kong
- Height: 1.72 m (5 ft 8 in)
- Weight: 63 kg (139 lb)

Sport
- Country: New Zealand
- Sport: Badminton
- Handedness: Right

Men's & mixed doubles
- Highest ranking: 32 (MD) 13 February 2014; 15 (XD) 16 July 2015
Medal record
Men's badminton
Representing New Zealand
Oceania Championships
Bronze medal – third place	2025 Auckland	Men's doubles

Chan Yun Lung
- Traditional Chinese: 陳潤龍
Transcriptions
Standard Mandarin
- Hanyu Pinyin: Chén Rùnlóng

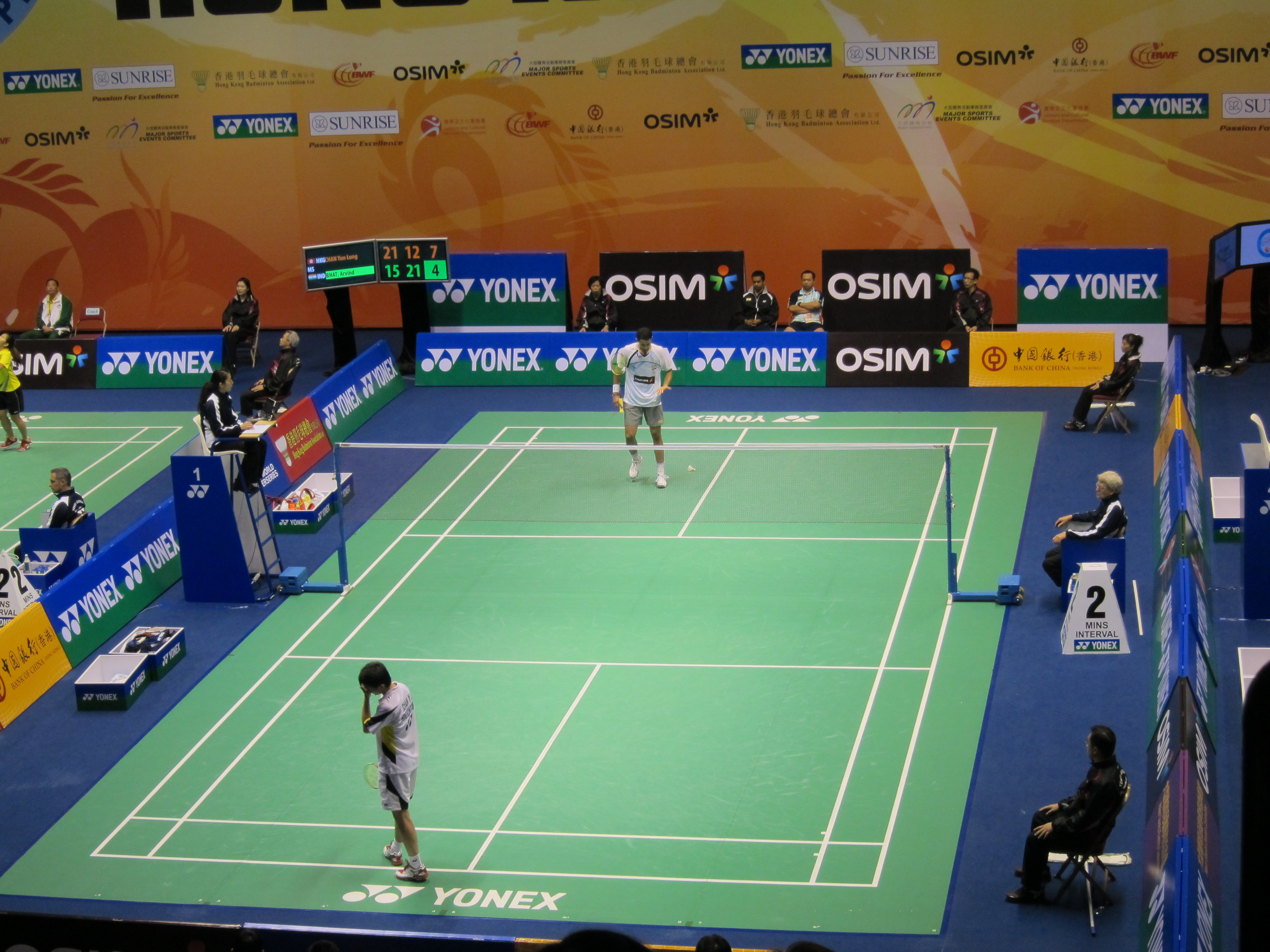
Hong Kong Open Badminton Championships 2011

Alan Chan Yun Lung (born 29 February 1988) is a male badminton player from New Zealand who specializes in doubles. In 2008 he started representing Hong Kong, then in 2017 he returned to representing New Zealand.

== Career ==
Chan started his junior career at age eight as a New Zealand player. In 1999, when he was eleven, he won the boys' and mixed doubles title at the New Zealand U-14 championships.

In 2004, he represented his country at the Commonwealth Youth Games in Bendigo, Australia. He was also a member of the New Zealand team at the 2007 Sudirman Cup in Glasgow, Scotland.

Chan moved to Hong Kong with his parents and, in 2008, he was selected to join the national team. He was the 2012 and 2013 mixed doubles champion at the Hong Kong national championships. He also represented Hong Kong at the 2014 Asian Games.

== Achievements ==
=== Oceania Championships ===
Men's doubles
Year	Venue	Partner	Opponent	Score	Result
2025	Badminton North Harbour Centre, Auckland, New Zealand	(New Zealand) Chance Cheng	(New Zealand) Adam Jeffrey (New Zealand) Dylan Soedjasa	18–21, 17–21	Bronze

=== BWF International Series ===
Mixed Doubles

Year	Tournament	Partner	Opponent	Score	Result
2013	Austrian International	(Hong Kong) Tse Ying Suet	(Hong Kong) Lee Chun Hei (Hong Kong) Chau Hoi Wah	15–21, 21–16, 21–16	(gold) Champion
2013	Vietnam International	(Hong Kong) Tse Ying Suet	(Hong Kong) Lee Chun Hei (Hong Kong) Chau Hoi Wah	21–4, 17–21, 21–17	(gold) Champion

Men's doubles

Year	Tournament	Partner	Opponent	Score	Result
2013	Vietnam International	(Hong Kong) Wong Wai Hong	(Chinese Taipei) Liao Min-chun (Chinese Taipei) Yang Po-han	28–30, 14–21	(silver) Runner-up
