= Rasmus Fladberg =

Danish badminton player (born 1992)

Personal information
- Born: 30 January 1992 (age 34) Køge, Denmark
- Height: 1.87 m (6 ft 2 in)
- Weight: 83 kg (183 lb)

Sport
- Country: Denmark
- Sport: Badminton
- Handedness: Right

Men's singles & doubles
- Highest ranking: 44 (MS 18 February 2015); 62 (MD 26 January 2017)
- BWF profile
Medal record
Men's badminton
Representing Denmark
European Men's Team Championships
| Gold medal – first place | 2012 Amsterdam | Men's team |
| Gold medal – first place | 2014 Basel | Men's team |
World Junior Championships
| Bronze medal – third place | 2010 Guadalajara | Boys' doubles |
European Junior Championships
| Silver medal – second place | 2011 Vantaa | Boys' singles |
| Bronze medal – third place | 2011 Vantaa | Boys' doubles |
| Bronze medal – third place | 2011 Vantaa | Mixed team |

Rasmus Fladberg (born 30 January 1992) is a Danish badminton player.

== Personal information ==
His parents Steen and Kirsten Fladberg are both former Danish badminton players.

== Achievements ==
=== BWF World Junior Championships ===
Boys' doubles
| Year | Venue | Partner | Opponent | Score | Result |
|---|---|---|---|---|---|
| 2010 | Domo del Code Jalisco; Guadalajara, Mexico | (Denmark) Kim Astrup | (Malaysia) Ow Yao Han (Malaysia) Yew Hong Kheng | 16–21, 25–27 | Bronze |

=== European Junior Championships ===
Boys' singles
| Year | Venue | Opponent | Score | Result |
|---|---|---|---|---|
| 2011 | Energia Areena; Vantaa, Finland | (Denmark) Viktor Axelsen | 8–21, 21–17, 13–21 | Silver |

Boys' doubles
| Year | Venue | Partner | Opponent | Score | Result |
|---|---|---|---|---|---|
| 2011 | Energia Areena; Vantaa, Finland | (Denmark) Kim Astrup | (England) Chris Coles (England) Matthew Nottingham | 17–21, 17–21 | Bronze |

=== BWF International Challenge/Series ===
Men's singles
| Year | Tournament | Opponent | Score | Result |
|---|---|---|---|---|
| 2011 | Banuinvest International | (Japan) Koichi Saeki | 13–21, 16–21 | (silver) Runner-up |
| 2011 | Hungarian International | (Ukraine) Vitaly Konov | 21–17, 21–10 | (gold) Winner |
| 2014 | Estonian International | (Ukraine) Valeriy Atrashchenkov | 21–14, 21–14 | (gold) Winner |
| 2014 | Polish Open | (France) Brice Leverdez | 6–21, 16–21 | (silver) Runner-up |
| 2014 | Dutch International | (Sri Lanka) Niluka Karunaratne | Walkover | (gold) Winner |
| 2014 | Spanish International | (Denmark) Joachim Persson | 12–21, 13–21 | (silver) Runner-up |
| 2014 | Kharkiv International | (Denmark) Joachim Persson | 11–7, 11–4, 11–9 | (gold) Winner |
| 2015 | Spanish International | (Spain) Pablo Abián | 16–21, 21–13, 10–21 | (silver) Runner-up |
| 2016 | Orléans International | (Denmark) Emil Holst | 17–21, 13–21 | (silver) Runner-up |

Men's doubles
| Year | Tournament | Partner | Opponent | Score | Result |
|---|---|---|---|---|---|
| 2011 | Swedish International Stockholm | (Denmark) Kim Astrup | (Poland) Łukasz Moreń (Poland) Wojciech Szkudlarczyk | 14–21, 25–23, 21–16 | (gold) Winner |
| 2011 | Croatian International | (Denmark) Kim Astrup | (Denmark) Niclas Nøhr (Denmark) Mads Pedersen | 18–21, 21–19, 21–16 | (gold) Winner |
| 2014 | Dutch International | (Denmark) Emil Holst | (Denmark) Kasper Antonsen (Denmark) Mikkel Delbo Larsen | 15–21, 18–21 | (silver) Runner-up |
| 2016 | Belgian International | (Denmark) Frederik Colberg | (Chinese Taipei) Lu Ching-yao (Chinese Taipei) Yang Po-han | 13–21, 13–21 | (silver) Runner-up |
| 2016 | Hungarian International | (Denmark) Frederik Colberg | (Singapore) Danny Bawa Chrisnanta (Singapore) Hendra Wijaya | 7–11, 15–14, 11–7, 9–11, 8–11 | (silver) Runner-up |
| 2016 | Yonex / K&D Graphics International | (Denmark) Frederik Colberg | (Canada) B. R. Sankeerth (Canada) Nyl Yakura | 21–8, 18–21, 21–6 | (gold) Winner |
| 2017 | Austrian Open | (Denmark) Frederik Colberg | (Japan) Takuto Inoue (Japan) Yuki Kaneko | 19–21, 17–21 | (silver) Runner-up |
| 2017 | Belgian International | (Denmark) Frederik Colberg | (England) Peter Briggs (England) Tom Wolfenden | 16–21, 21–13, 21–6 | (gold) Winner |
| 2017 | Hungarian International | (Denmark) Frederik Colberg | (Denmark) Joel Eipe (Denmark) Philip Seerup | 21–18, 21–14 | (gold) Winner |

BWF International Challenge tournament
BWF International Series tournament
BWF Future Series tournament
