= Chong Sook Chin =

Malaysian badminton player (born 1987)

Chong Sook Chin 张淑晶
Personal information
- Born: 23 April 1987 (age 39) Selangor, Malaysia

Sport
- Country: Malaysia
- Sport: Badminton
- Event: Women's & mixed doubles

Women's & mixed doubles
- BWF profile
Medal record
Women's badminton
Representing Malaysia
Southeast Asian Games
Gold medal – first place	2009 Vientiane	Women's team
Bronze medal – third place	2011 Jakarta	Women's team
Asian Junior Championships
Silver medal – second place	2005 Jakarta	Girls' team

Sabrina Chong Sook Chin (born 23 April 1987) is a Malaysian badminton player. She was part of the Malaysia junior team that won the silver medal at the 2005 Asian Junior Championships in the girls' team event after defeated by the Chinese team in the final. Chong joined the Malaysia squad that won the women's team gold medal at the 2009 Southeast Asian Games, and the team were awarded Best Female Olympians by the Deputy Prime Minister and Olympic Council of Malaysia. Partnered with Lim Khim Wah, they clinched the mixed doubles title at the 2010 Malaysia International tournament.

== Achievements ==
=== BWF International Challenge/Series ===
Women's doubles
Year	Tournament	Partner	Opponent	Score	Result
2009	Malaysia International	(Malaysia) Woon Khe Wei	(Japan) Rie Eto (Japan) Yu Wakita	18–21, 11–21	(silver) Runner-up

Mixed doubles
Year	Tournament	Partner	Opponent	Score	Result
2010	Malaysia International	(Malaysia) Lim Khim Wah	(Malaysia) Mohd Razif Abdul Latif (Malaysia) Amelia Alicia Anscelly	30–28, 21–13	(gold) Winner
2008	Vietnam International	(Malaysia) Mohd Razif Abdul Latif	(Malaysia) Lim Khim Wah (Malaysia) Ng Hui Lin	15–21, 21–19, 15–21	(silver) Runner-up

BWF International Challenge tournament
BWF International Series tournament
