= Rie Eto (badminton) =

Japanese badminton player (born 1988)

Personal information
- Born: 26 February 1988 (age 38) Ōita Prefecture, Japan
- Height: 1.62 m (5 ft 4 in)

Sport
- Country: Japan
- Sport: Badminton

Women's singles & doubles
- Highest ranking: 96 (WS 15 April 2010); 13 (WD 27 January 2011); 89 (XD 19 January 2017)
- BWF profile

Rie Eto (江藤 理恵, Etō Rie; born 26 February 1988) is a Japanese badminton player. In 2009, she won the Malaysia International Challenge tournament in the women's doubles event partnered with Yu Wakita. In 2010, she and Wakita became the runner-up at the U.S. Open. In 2017, she won the mixed doubles titles at the China International tournament partnered with Tomoya Takashina.

== Achievements ==
=== BWF Grand Prix (1 runner-up) ===
The BWF Grand Prix has two level such as Grand Prix and Grand Prix Gold. It is a series of badminton tournaments, sanctioned by Badminton World Federation (BWF) since 2007.

Women's doubles
Year	Tournament	Partner	Opponent	Score	Result	Ref.
2010	U.S. Open	(Japan) Yu Wakita	(Chinese Taipei) Cheng Wen-hsing (Chinese Taipei) Chien Yu-chin	8–21, 20–22	(silver) Runner-up	

BWF Grand Prix Gold tournament

=== BWF International Challenge/Series (13 titles, 3 runners-up) ===
Women's singles
Year	Tournament	Opponent	Score	Result
2010	Iran Fajr International	(India) P. V. Sindhu	21–14, 26–24	(gold) Winner

Women's doubles
Year	Tournament	Partner	Opponent	Score	Result	Ref.
2009	Malaysia International	(Japan) Yu Wakita	(Malaysia) Chong Sook Chin (Malaysia) Woon Khe Wei	21–18, 21–11	(gold) Winner	
2010	Vietnam International	(Japan) Yu Wakita	(South Korea) Jung Kyung-eun (South Korea) Yoo Hyun-young	16–21, 18–21	(silver) Runner-up	
2010	Lao International	(Japan) Yu Wakita	(Thailand) Nandatheero Peranart (Thailand) Lerthiran Prangnuch	21–18, 21–8	(gold) Winner	
2010	Iran Fajr International	(Japan) Yu Wakita	(Iran) Negin Amiripour (Iran) Sahar Zamanian	21–5, 21–12	(gold) Winner	
2010	Austrian International	(Japan) Yu Wakita	(Japan) Naoko Fukuman (Japan) Minatsu Mitani	21–14, 21–10	(gold) Winner	
2011	Polish Open	(Japan) Yu Wakita	(Japan) Kana Ito (Japan) Asumi Kugo	21–16, 21–9	(gold) Winner	
2011	Swedish International	(Japan) Yu Wakita	(Denmark) Line Damkjær Kruse (Denmark) Marie Røpke	14–21, 16–21	(silver) Runner-up	
2012	Iran Fajr International	(Japan) Yu Wakita	(Japan) Ayumi Tasaki (Japan) Seiko Yamada	21–15, 23–21	(gold) Winner	
2012	Osaka International	(Japan) Yu Wakita	(Japan) Naoko Fukuman (Japan) Kurumi Yonao	21–18, 21–12	(gold) Winner	
2012	Maldives International	(Japan) Yu Wakita	(Japan) Naoko Fukuman (Japan) Kurumi Yonao	18–21, 21–13, 21–23	(silver) Runner-up	
2013	Polish Open	(Japan) Yu Wakita	(Japan) Yuki Anai (Japan) Yumi Murayama	21–11, 21–7	(gold) Winner	
2013	French International	(Japan) Yu Wakita	(Malaysia) Amelia Alicia Anscelly (Malaysia) Soong Fie Cho	21–17, 21–17	(gold) Winner	
2013	Osaka International	(Japan) Yu Wakita	(Japan) Yuriko Miki (Japan) Koharu Yonemoto	21–10, 21–13	(gold) Winner	
2013	Dutch International	(Japan) Yu Wakita	(Scotland) Imogen Bankier (Bulgaria) Petya Nedelcheva	14–21, 21–18, 21–12	(gold) Winner	

Mixed doubles
Year	Tournament	Partner	Opponent	Score	Result
2017	China International	(Japan) Tomoya Takashina	(China) Tan Qiang (China) Xu Ya	11–7, 11–5, 13–11	(gold) Winner

BWF International Challenge tournament
BWF International Series tournament
BWF Future Series tournament
