= Lee–Lin rivalry =

Badminton rivalry

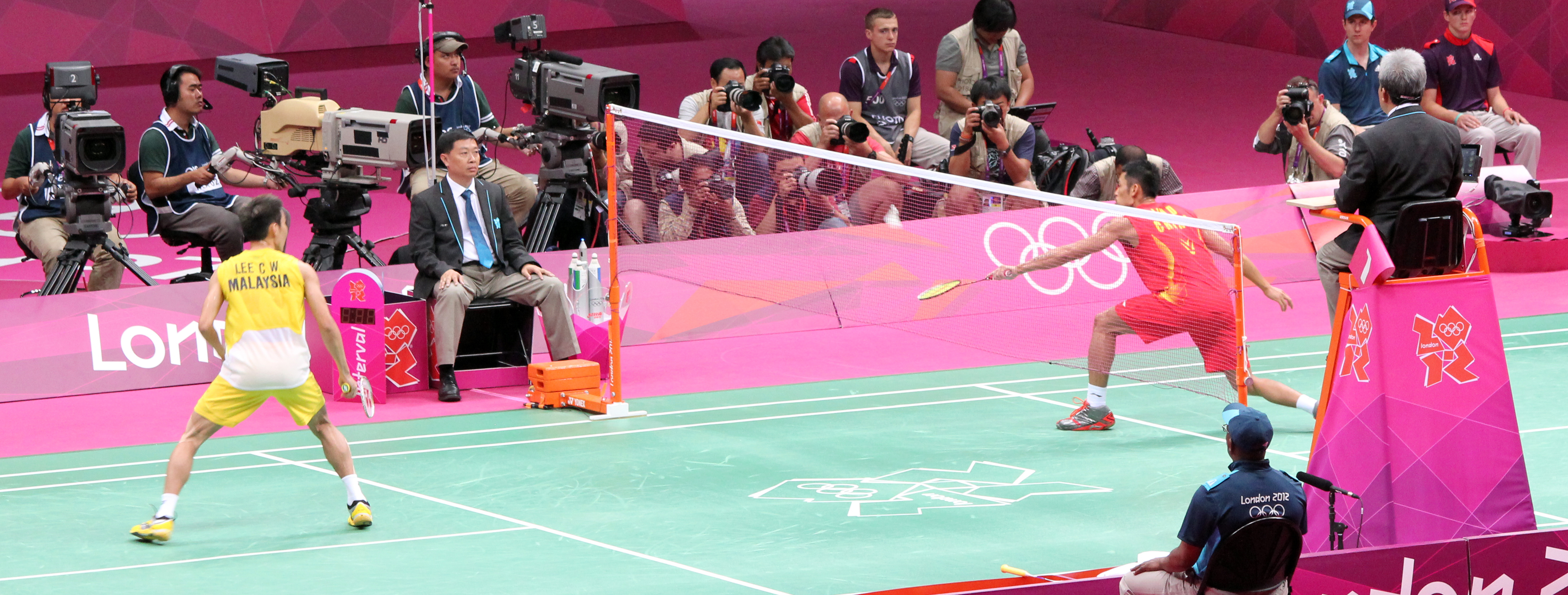
Lee and Lin battling in the final of the 2012 Olympic Games

The Lee–Lin rivalry was a rivalry between two professional badminton players, Lee Chong Wei and Lin Dan. It is considered among the greatest rivalries in badminton history.

Of their 40 meetings, Lin won the head to head battle by 28–12. They met in the final 22 times, semi-finals 15 times, including twice each in the finals of the Olympic Games and World Championships, which Lin took all the victories. Lin was also better in their 11 meetings in Super Series finals (including Super Series Premier) tournaments, where Lin took 9 of them.

Each athlete has their own successes. Lee won 47 Super Series titles between 2007–2017 and ranked first worldwide for 349 weeks, which included a 199-week streak from 21 August 2008 to 14 June 2012. Lin achieved a "Super Grand Slam" at the age of 28 by winning all 9 premier titles.

Their last meeting was 2018 All England Open, which Lin won, before Lee announced retirement due to nose cancer.

== Background ==
Lee and Lin have played a total of 40 times, with Lin having the upper hand in their rivalry with a final head to head record of 28–12. Lee Chong Wei and Lin Dan are by far two of the most dominant players across three generations, and many regard Lin Dan as the greatest of all time, leading to media and players alike to liken the period between 2006 and 2016 as the Lin–Lee era.

As both great athletes, they are noted for their signature playing styles. Lee is famed for his incredible speed, counter-attacking prowess, crouch defence, recovery, deceptive net play and steep, hard-hitting jump smashes. Some have considered the cross-court smash as Lee's favourite shot despite its difficulty to execute. Lin, on the other hand, is famed for his patience, tactical awareness in adjusting to his opponents' style of play, sudden unleashing of huge and especially heavy attacks, sliding defence and all-round court play. Over the years, with the decline of fellow legend Taufik Hidayat and Danish great Peter Gade, Lee and Lin continuously adjusted their game to better suit the playing styles of each other, having already reached a level far beyond everyone else and thus began cementing their duopoly which lasted around a decade. During this time, they often swatted other competitors aside before engaging one another in major tournament finals. This continued until the emergence of eventual two-time world champion and 2016 Olympic champion Chen Long and 2017 world champion Viktor Axelsen as Lin and Lee entered their 30s.

In their homeland, each hold a military rank, with Lee a Commander (Honorary) of the Royal Malaysian Navy Volunteer Reserve unit and Lin a retired Lieutenant colonel in the People's Liberation Army Sports branch, having been promoted from the ranks of Lieutenant commander and Major, respectively, meaning they have the same seniority in terms of military rank. In 2015, Lin Dan announced he was to leave the PLA's Bayi Badminton Club after a 20-year service due to strict military protocols prohibiting him from partaking in any commercial activities.

They have contested in many major tournament finals and are currently the only two badminton men singles players who have contested in two Olympic finals consecutively, which saw Lin triumph both times to become the first man in history to defend his Olympic gold. Lin first won in Beijing 2008 in a one-sided final before the two men clashed once again 4 years later in an unprecedented but widely anticipated repeat final at London 2012. This time around, the match was much closer with Lee drawing first blood before Lin hit back to take the match to a decider. The game swung back and forth with 13 ties, the last one 19–19. Lin Dan then took the next 2 points to win his second Olympic gold. As Lin celebrated, Lee remained motionless and teared up before his coaches consoled him to leave the court. While some people questioned Lee's mental strength at critical matches afterward, such notion was not supported by match results. For example, five times during the Lee–Lin rivalry, the match went to 3 games and was decided by only 2 points in the final game. Lee led Lin 3–2 in such extremely tight contests, the last such match came during their colossal 2016 Summer Olympics semi-final, which Lee won the decider with a score of 22-20.

They have also contested two BWF World Championships finals, one Asian Games final and semi-final, similarly in the Badminton Asia Championships and four All England Open Badminton Championships finals where almost all matches were very close hard-fought three-setters. Their 2011 World Badminton Championship match widely touted as one of the greatest badminton matches of all the time. In the semi-finals of the 2016 Rio Olympics, a match widely touted to be the de facto final for possibly the last Olympic Games of both athletes' careers, Lee won against Lin in his third try on the Olympic stage and became the second shuttler in any discipline of the sport in history to reach 3 consecutive finals after Fu Haifeng who had achieved the feat a day earlier in men doubles. During the decider round with the score tied at 20-20, Lee successfully took the next two points to notch one of his biggest wins against Lin and sank to his knees in celebration. Videos uploaded onto social media captured the overwhelming and emotional response from Malaysians watching throughout the country, further cementing Lee's megastar and hero status in his home country. The two players then exchanged a special moment in their rivalry and exchanged shirts as they exited the court.

Early on in their career, whenever Lin and Lee were to play one another, fans were extremely hostile towards their opposite number, often trading barbs, insults and even expletives. Occasionally, Lee had to remind fans that Lin was a personal friend of his and hoped that his fans would change their attitude towards his arch-rival. Over time, hostility became admiration, hatred became respect as fans realised that what they were witnessing was a once in a generation great sporting rivalry of the highest level and began cheering for both players, most evidently when they played in Malaysia and China. Most evidently, when Lee returned from his 8-month doping suspension to represent Malaysia in the 2015 Sudirman Cup held in Dongguan, China, he was given a rousing ovation when announced onto court to take on Lee Dong-keun. This prompted commentator, Gillian Clark, to quip, "Well listen to the fans here! It isn't a Chinese player, it's Lee Chong Wei!". Lee's coach Tey Seu Bock even labelled their rivalry 'limited-edition'. However, this does not stop some hardcore fans who take every opportunity that arises to disparage Lee's accomplishments and status by comparing the two and will point out the fact that Lee, the perennial World No. 1, has never won an Olympic or world title whilst Lin has won both multiple times. Unfortunately, this usually leads to heated exchanges from both sides of supporters, especially on social media. Level-headed fans will try to calm things down by reminding that this once-in-an-era rivalry has entered its final chapter and everyone should be appreciating what the two men has showcased throughout their storied careers rather than be at loggerheads till the very end. Over the years, both Lee and Lin mentioned numerous times in interviews that they would never have become what they are without the other as their motivation. Nevertheless, the pair are good friends off court, having invited one another to each other's weddings and sharing a mutual love for fast cars and watches. Among the cars that Lee is known to own or have owned include a blue Lamborghini Huracán, blue Range Rover Sport, blue BMW M5, crystal grey Bentley Continental GT, a white Audi R8, a white Ferrari F430, a grey Nissan Skyline GTR, Range Rover Evoque, Range Rover, yellow Lamborghini Aventador and a BMW X6 besides the cars given to him by national automaker Proton, mostly bearing the car plate number of 6, including a 'BMW 6' currently registered to his M5. Lin, on the other hand, has a Porsche Panamera, a grey Aston Martin DBS and also a black Nissan Skyline GTR among his vast collection of supercars.

== List of all head-to-head matches ==
No.	Year	Tournament	Series	Round	Winner	Score	Lee	Lin
1	2004	Thomas Cup Asia Preliminaries		Final	Lin	3–15, 15–13, 15–6	0	1
2	2005	Malaysia Open		Final	Lee	17–15, 9–15, 15–9	1	1
3	2005	Hong Kong Open		Semi-finals	Lin	15–4, 15–6	1	2
4	2006	All England Open		Semi-finals	Lin	15–9, 10–15, 17–14	1	3
5	2006	Malaysia Open		Final	Lee	21–18, 18–21, 23–21	2	3
6	2006	Chinese Taipei Open		Final	Lin	21–18, 12–21, 21–11	2	4
7	2006	Macau Open		Final	Lin	21–18, 18–21, 21–18	2	5
8	2006	Hong Kong Open		Final	Lin	21–19, 8–21, 21–16	2	6
9	2007	Sudirman Cup	BWF tournaments	Group stage	Lee	21–17, 21–17	3	6
10	2007	China Masters	Super Series	Semi-finals	Lin	15–21, 21–14, 21–15	3	7
11	2007	Japan Open	Super Series	Semi-finals	Lee	21–19, 21–15	4	7
12	2007	Hong Kong Open	Super Series	Final	Lin	9–21, 21–15, 21–15	4	8
13	2008	Swiss Open	Super Series	Final	Lin	21–13, 21–18	4	9
14	2008	Thomas Cup	BWF tournaments	Semi-finals	Lee	21–12, 21–14	5	9
15	2008	Olympic Games	Multi-sport events	Final	Lin	21–12, 21–8	5	10
16	2008	China Open	Super Series	Final	Lin	21–18, 21–9	5	11
17	2009	All England Open	Super Series	Final	Lin	21–19, 21–12	5	12
18	2009	Swiss Open	Super Series	Final	Lee	21–16, 21–16	6	12
19	2009	Sudirman Cup	BWF tournaments	Semi-finals	Lin	21–16, 21–16	6	13
20	2009	China Masters	Super Series	Semi-finals	Lin	22–20, 15–21, 21–7	6	14
21	2010	Thomas Cup	BWF tournaments	Semi-finals	Lin	21–17, 21–8	6	15
22	2010	Japan Open	Super Series	Final	Lee	22–20, 16–21, 21–17	7	15
23	2010	Asian Games	Multi-sport events	Final	Lin	21–13, 15–21, 21–10	7	16
24	2011	Korea Open	Super Series Premier	Final	Lin	21–19, 14–21, 21–16	7	17
25	2011	All England Open	Super Series Premier	Final	Lee	21–17, 21–17	8	17
26	2011	BWF World Championships	BWF tournaments	Final	Lin	20–22, 21–14, 23–21	8	18
27	2011	Hong Kong Open	Super Series	Semi-finals	Lin	21–16, 21–14	8	19
28	2011	China Open	Super Series Premier	Semi-finals	Lin	19–21, 21–12, 21–11	8	20
29	2012	Korea Open	Super Series Premier	Final	Lee	12–21, 21–18, 21–14	9	20
30	2012	All England Open	Super Series Premier	Final	Lin	21–19, 6–2^{r}	9	21
31	2012	Olympic Games	Multi-sport events	Final	Lin	15–21, 21–10, 21–19	9	22
32	2013	BWF World Championships	BWF tournaments	Final	Lin	16–21, 21–13, 20–17^{r}	9	23
33	2014	Asian Games	Multi-sport events	Semi-finals	Lin	22–20, 12–21, 21–9	9	24
34	2015	Japan Open	Super Series	Last 16	Lin	21–17, 21–10	9	25
35	2015	China Open	Super Series Premier	Semi-finals	Lee	17–21, 21–19, 21–19	10	25
36	2016	Badminton Asia Championships	BAC tournaments	Semi-finals	Lee	22–20, 15–21, 21–4	11	25
37	2016	Olympic Games	Multi-sport events	Semi-finals	Lee	15–21, 21–11, 22–20	12	25
38	2017	Malaysia Open	Super Series Premier	Final	Lin	21–19, 21–14	12	26
39	2017	Badminton Asia Championships	BAC tournaments	Semi-finals	Lin	21–13, 21–15	12	27
40	2018	All England Open	Super 1000	Quarter-finals	Lin	21–16, 21–17	12	28

== Analysis ==
=== Comparison by medals ===
Tournament	Lee			Lin		
Tournament	Gold	Silver	Bronze	Gold	Silver	Bronze
Olympic Games	0	3	0	2	0	0
Asian Games	0	1	2	2	1	0
World Championships	0	3	1	5	2	0
World Cup	0	0	0	2	0	0
Asia Championships	2	0	2	4	2	1
World Junior Championships	0	0	1	0	0	1
Asia Junior Championships	0	0	0	1	0	0

=== Comparison by titles ===
Tournament	Lee	Lin
Super Series Finals	4	1
All England Open	4	6
Australian Open	0	1
Brasil Open	0	1
China Masters	0	6
Canadian Open	1	0
China Open	1	5
Chinese Taipei Open	1	2
Denmark Open	2	3
French Open	3	1
German Open	0	6
Hong Kong Open	5	5
India Open	3	0
India Satellite	1	0
Indonesia Open	6	0
Japan Open	6	3
Korea Open	3	3
Macau Open	2	1
Malaysia Masters	5	0
Malaysia Open	12	2
Malaysia Satellite	1	0
New Zealand Open	0	1
Philippines Open	1	0
Singapore Open	1	0
Swiss Open	2	3
Thailand Open	0	1
U.S. Open	1	0
Total	65	51

== Notable records ==
Lee is the most successful player during the Super Series era from 2007 to 2017, amassing 47 titles. With the Super Series replaced by the new World Tour tournament system from 2018, Lee's record can no longer be surpassed. He also spent 348 weeks on the top of the world ranking, these including 199 consecutive weeks from August 2008 to June 2012.

In March 2017, Lee became the oldest singles player in the Open era to win the All England Open at the age of 34 years and 142 days.

At the age of 28, Lin achieved "Super Grand Slam" by winning all 9 premier titles in badminton: Olympic Games, World Championships, World Cup, Thomas Cup, Sudirman Cup, Super Series Finals, All England Open, Asian Games, and Asian Championships, becoming the first and only player to achieve this feat.

Lin became the first men's singles player to retain the Olympic title. He also became the first singles player contested the All England Open final 10 times.

Lee Chong Wei is the record title holder for several tournaments: Malaysia Open (12 titles), first non-Indonesian to win Indonesia Open 6 times, Japan Open (6 times). Lin won a record 5 China Open and 6 China Masters titles. Currently, both are joint 5-time Hong Kong Open record titles.

== Relationship ==
Although Lin was often criticised for his brashness and arrogance on the court, Lee and Lin are friends on and off the court, using each other to improve on themselves. They even partnered together for exhibition matches.

During the 2013 World Championships final, Lin checked on Lee when the latter suffered leg cramps. In the post match interview, Lin said that they are no longer the opponents they were before, and that they cherish every opportunity to play against each other.

In April 2020, on Facebook Live, Lee described Lin as a legend, adding that his titles speak for themselves and that badminton fans need to salute him for his career. He considers Lin as the greatest badminton player, and also admitted that his obsession to be better than Lin motivates him to work harder. Lee has also said that Lin has won all the major titles and does not need to prove anything else.

== Cultural impact ==
The Lee–Lin rivalry has been hailed as the greatest rivalry in badminton and one that transformed the world of badminton. It has been credited for the resurgence of interest in badminton.

After the Rio Olympics semi-finals clash which Lee won, a post was circulated to Facebook and Twitter circles claiming to be a translated emotionally charged letter written by Lin in gratitude to Lee. The letter was revealed to be fake and written by an unnamed fan, though it was described as touching by the media. Lee himself affirmed the post as such in a press conference with Malaysian media greeting the Malaysian contingent home after the Olympics.

== Retirements ==
In 2019, Lee announced his retirement from the sport, members of the media and players alike paid tribute to him. His career-long rival, Lin has joined in and wrote on Sina Weibo that he now has to "head into battle alone, as he no longer has a companion anymore (独自上场没人陪我了)", and shared a song titled "Don't Cry, Friend" (朋友别哭).

A year later in 2020, Lin also announced his retirement, ending the rivalry of the two great badminton players and good friends. Lee has also a heartfelt tribute to Lin by posting "You were king where we fought so proudly" on Twitter.

== See also ==
- Lee Chong Wei career statistics
