= Li Wing Mui =

Hong Kong badminton player (born 1979)

Li Wing Mui 李詠梅
Personal information
- Born: 19 September 1979 (age 46)
- Height: 165 cm (5 ft 5 in)

Sport
- Country: Hong Kong
- Sport: Badminton
- Handedness: Right
- BWF profile
Medal record
Women's badminton
Representing Hong Kong
Asian Games
Bronze medal – third place	2002 Busan	Women's team
Asian Championships
Bronze medal – third place	2005 Hyderabad	Mixed doubles

Li Wing Mui (Chinese: 李詠梅; Jyutping: lei^{5} wing^{6} mui^{4}; Pinyin: Lǐ Yǒngméi) (born 19 September 1979) is a badminton player from Hong Kong.

She competed in badminton at the 2004 Summer Olympics in women's doubles with partner Koon Wai Chee. They were defeated by Gail Emms and Donna Kellogg of Great Britain in the round of 32. In 2002 she won her first title at the Hong Kong National Badminton Championships.
