= Wong Wai Hong =

Hong Kong badminton player

Wong Wai Hong 王偉康
Personal information
- Born: 31 March 1986 (age 40)
- Height: 1.76 m (5 ft 9 in)
- Weight: 70 kg (154 lb)

Sport
- Country: Hong Kong
- Sport: Badminton
- Handedness: Right

Men's & mixed doubles
- Highest ranking: 21 (MD 25 November 2010); 23 (XD 15 September 2011)
- BWF profile
Medal record
Men's badminton
Representing Hong Kong
East Asian Games
Silver medal – second place	2013 Tianjin	Men's team

Wong Wai Hong (Chinese: 王偉康; born 31 March 1986) is a badminton player from Hong Kong. In 2010, he became the runner-up at the Polish International tournament in the men's doubles event partnered with Yohan Hadikusumo Wiratama. In 2011, he won the Austrian International tournament in the mixed doubles event partnered with Chau Hoi Wah. In 2012, Wong and his partner repeat their success in Austria. Partnering with Chan Yun Lung in the men's doubles, he became the runner-up at the 2013 Vietnam International tournament.

== Achievements ==
=== BWF Grand Prix ===
The BWF Grand Prix has two levels, the Grand Prix and Grand Prix Gold. It is a series of badminton tournaments sanctioned by the Badminton World Federation (BWF) since 2007.

Men's doubles
Year	Tournament	Partner	Opponent	Score	Result
2009	Chinese Taipei Open	(Hong Kong) Yohan Hadikusumo Wiratama	(Chinese Taipei) Chen Hung-ling (Chinese Taipei) Lin Yu-lang	21–14, 12–21, 19–21	(silver) Runner-up

BWF Grand Prix Gold tournament
BWF Grand Prix tournament

=== BWF International Challenge/Series ===
Men's doubles
Year	Tournament	Partner	Opponent	Score	Result
2010	Polish International	(Hong Kong) Yohan Hadikusumo Wiratama	(Russia) Vladimir Ivanov (Russia) Ivan Sozonov	17–21, 21–14, 14–21	(silver) Runner-up
2013	Vietnam International	(Hong Kong) Chan Yun Lung	(Chinese Taipei) Liao Min-chun (Chinese Taipei) Yang Po-han	28–30, 14–21	(silver) Runner-up

Mixed doubles
Year	Tournament	Partner	Opponent	Score	Result
2011	Austrian International	(Hong Kong) Chau Hoi Wah	(Denmark) Mads Pieler Kolding (Denmark) Julie Houmann	21–17, 21–11	(gold) Winner
2012	Austrian International	(Hong Kong) Chau Hoi Wah	(Switzerland) Anthony Dumartheray (Switzerland) Sabrina Jaquet	21–6, 21–10	(gold) Winner

BWF International Challenge tournament
BWF International Series tournament
