= Yohan Hadikusumo Wiratama =

Indonesian badminton player

Personal information
- Born: 6 April 1977 (age 49)
- Height: 1.78 m (5 ft 10 in)
- Weight: 76 kg (168 lb)

Sport
- Country: Hong Kong
- Sport: Badminton
- Handedness: Right

Men singles, doubles, & mixed doubles
- Highest ranking: 9 (MS), 7 (MD), 8 (XD)
- BWF profile
Medal record
Men's badminton
Representing Hong Kong
East Asian Games
| Bronze medal – third place | 2009 Hong Kong | Mixed doubles |
Representing Indonesia
Southeast Asian Games
| Gold medal – first place | 1999 Bandar Seri Begawan | Men's team |

Yohan Hadikusumo Wiratama (Chinese: 魏仁君; pinyin: Wèi Rénjūn; born 6 April 1977) is a badminton player from Indonesia. He is a younger brother of Olympic gold medalist from Indonesia, Alan Budikusuma. He moved to Hong Kong due to tight competition in Indonesia. In Hong Kong, he partnered with another Indonesian who moved to Hong Kong, Albertus Susanto Njoto, in men's doubles.

== Career ==
Wiratama came from the Djarum Kudus badminton club, and in 2002, he started to represent Hong Kong. He competed at the 2006 and 2010 Asian Games. He was the mixed doubles bronze medallist at the 2009 East Asian Games.

In Men's Single, Yohan Hadikusumo won gold medal in Indonesian games in 2000, also defeated 2 olympics gold medalist, 1st defeated Ji Xinpeng from China at Singapore Open 2001, 2nd defeated Taufik Hidayat from Indonesia at Hong Kong Open 2003.

In Men's Doubles, Yohan paired Albertus Susanto Njoto defeated another Olympic gold medalist in men's doubles Cai Yun and Fu Hai Feng from China at All England 2008.

Wiratama played at the 2007 BWF World Championships in men's doubles with Albertus Susanto Njoto. They were seeded #12 Yohan Hadikusumo Wiratama is the current world record holder for the most head shots in a badminton game. his record is 15 head shots in one single game. In 2017, Wiratama who was 40 years old, plays for Australia and won the men's doubles title at the Sydney International tournament with Albertus Susanto Njoto.

== Achievements ==
=== East Asian Games ===
Mixed doubles
| Year | Venue | Partner | Opponent | Score | Result |
|---|---|---|---|---|---|
| 2009 | Queen Elizabeth Stadium, Hong Kong | (Hong Kong) Chau Hoi Wah | (China) Zhang Nan (China) Ma Jin | 14–21, 16–21 | Bronze |

=== BWF Grand Prix (3 titles, 5 runners-up) ===
The BWF Grand Prix had two levels, the BWF Grand Prix and Grand Prix Gold. It was a series of badminton tournaments sanctioned by the Badminton World Federation (BWF) which was held from 2007 to 2017. The World Badminton Grand Prix sanctioned by International Badminton Federation (IBF) from 1983 to 2006.

Men's doubles
| Year | Tournament | Partner | Opponent | Score | Result |
|---|---|---|---|---|---|
| 2006 | Philippines Open | (Hong Kong) Albert Susanto Njoto | (Indonesia) Hendra Aprida Gunawan (Indonesia) Joko Riyadi | 18–21, 21–12, 21–19 | (gold) Winner |
| 2007 | New Zealand Open | (Hong Kong) Albert Susanto Njoto | (Malaysia) Chan Chong Ming (Malaysia) Hoon Thien How | 14–21, 22–20, 11–21 | (silver) Runner-up |
| 2009 | Chinese Taipei Open | (Hong Kong) Wong Wai Hong | (Chinese Taipei) Chen Hung-ling (Chinese Taipei) Lin Yu-lang | 21–14, 12–21, 19–21 | (silver) Runner-up |

Mixed doubles
| Year | Tournament | Partner | Opponent | Score | Result |
|---|---|---|---|---|---|
| 2008 | Macau Open | (Hong Kong) Chau Hoi Wah | (China) Xu Chen (China) Zhao Yunlei | 15–21, 16–21 | (silver) Runner-up |
| 2009 | Australian Open | (Hong Kong) Chau Hoi Wah | (New Zealand) Henry Tam (New Zealand) Donna Haliday | 21–11, 21–5 | (gold) Winner |
| 2009 | New Zealand Open | (Hong Kong) Chau Hoi Wah | (Indonesia) Fran Kurniawan (Indonesia) Pia Zebadiah Bernadet | 13–21, 19–21 | (silver) Runner-up |
| 2010 | German Open | (Hong Kong) Tse Ying Suet | (England) Robert Blair (Scotland) Imogen Bankier | 15–5 retired | (gold) Winner |
| 2010 | Vietnam Open | (Hong Kong) Tse Ying Suet | (China) He Hanbin (China) Ma Jin | 18–21, 11–21 | (silver) Runner-up |

BWF Grand Prix Gold tournament
BWF Grand Prix tournament

=== BWF International Challenge/Series/Satellite (2 titles, 4 runners-up) ===
Men's singles
| Year | Tournament | Opponent | Score | Result |
|---|---|---|---|---|
| 2003 | Western Australia International | (Hong Kong) Ng Wei | 7–15, 12–15 | (silver) Runner-up |

Men's doubles
| Year | Tournament | Partner | Opponent | Score | Result |
|---|---|---|---|---|---|
| 2003 | Western Australia International | (Hong Kong) Yau Tsz Yuk | (Singapore) Hendri Kurniawan Saputra (Singapore) Denny Setiawan | 8–15, 9–15 | (silver) Runner-up |
| 2006 | Vietnam Satellite | (Hong Kong) Albertus Susanto Njoto | (Thailand) Patapol Ngernsrisuk (Thailand) Sudket Prapakamol | 16–21, 11–21 | (silver) Runner-up |
| 2010 | Polish International | (Hong Kong) Wong Wai Hong | (Russia) Vladimir Ivanov (Russia) Ivan Sozonov | 17–21, 21–14, 14–21 | (silver) Runner-up |
| 2017 | Sydney International | (Australia) Albertus Susanto Njoto | (Chinese Taipei) Chuang Pu-sheng (Chinese Taipei) Lin Yu-chieh | 21–14, 21–6 | (gold) Winner |

Mixed doubles
| Year | Tournament | Partner | Opponent | Score | Result |
|---|---|---|---|---|---|
| 2010 | Singapore International | (Hong Kong) Tse Ying Suet | (South Korea) Lee Jae-jin (South Korea) Yim Jae-eun | 21–13, 21–19 | (gold) Winner |

BWF International Challenge tournament
BWF International Series tournament
