= Yew Hong Kheng =

Malaysian badminton player (born 1992)

Yew Hong Kheng 尤芳庆
Personal information
- Born: 1 February 1992 (age 34) Penang, Malaysia

Sport
- Country: Malaysia
- Sport: Badminton
- Handedness: Right

Men's doubles
- Highest ranking: 99 (12 September 2013)
- Current ranking: 378 (20 April 2017)
- BWF profile
Medal record
Men's badminton
Representing Malaysia
World Junior Championships
Gold medal – first place	2010 Guadalajara	Boys' doubles
Silver medal – second place	2009 Alor Setar	Mixed team
Bronze medal – third place	2010 Guadalajara	Mixed team
Commonwealth Youth Games
Gold medal – first place	2008 Pune	Boys' doubles
Asia Junior Championships
Gold medal – first place	2009 Kuala Lumpur	Mixed team
Silver medal – second place	2010 Kuala Lumpur	Boys' doubles
Silver medal – second place	2010 Kuala Lumpur	Mixed team
Silver medal – second place	2009 Kuala Lumpur	Boys' doubles

Yew Hong Kheng (born 1 February 1992) is a Malaysian male badminton player. He started playing badminton at the primary school when he was 10. In 2008, he won the gold medal at the 2008 Commonwealth Youth Games in Pune, India. He won the boys' doubles title at the 2010 BWF World Junior Championships partnered with Ow Yao Han, and in 2011, he joined the Malaysia national badminton team. In 2015, he won the Iran Fajr International tournament in the men's doubles event with Tai An Khang. In December 2015, he quit from the Badminton Association of Malaysia (BAM).

== Achievements ==
=== World Junior Championships ===
Boys' doubles
Year	Venue	Partner	Opponent	Score	Result
2010	Domo del Code Jalisco; Guadalajara, Mexico	(Malaysia) Ow Yao Han	(Malaysia) Nelson Heg Wei Keat (Malaysia) Teo Ee Yi	21-18, 21-15	Gold

=== Commonwealth Youth Games ===
Boys' doubles
Year	Venue	Partner	Opponent	Score	Result
2008	Shree Shiv Chhatrapati Sports Complex, Pune, India	(Malaysia) Ow Yao Han	(Malaysia) Lim Yu Sheng (Malaysia) Loh Wei Sheng	14–21, 21–13, 21–14	Gold

=== Asia Junior Championships ===
Boys' doubles
Year	Venue	Partner	Opponent	Score	Result
2010	Stadium Juara, Kuala Lumpur, Malaysia	(Malaysia) Ow Yao Han	(South Korea) Kang Ji-wook (South Korea) Choi Seung-il	16-21, 14-21	Silver
2009	Stadium Juara, Kuala Lumpur, Malaysia	(Malaysia) Ow Yao Han	(Indonesia) Angga Pratama (Indonesia) Yohanes Rendy Sugiarto	15-21, 16-21	Silver

=== BWF International Challenge/Series ===
Men's doubles
Year	Tournament	Partner	Opponent	Score	Result
2015	Iran Fajr International	(Malaysia) Tai An Khang	(Philippines) Aries Delos Santos (Philippines) Alvin Morada	21–12, 18–21, 21–16	(gold) Winner

BWF International Challenge tournament
BWF International Series tournament
BWF Future Series tournament
