= Lee Chong Wei career statistics =

This is a list of the main career statistics of Malaysian professional badminton player, Lee Chong Wei. To date, Lee has won a total of sixty-nine BWF singles titles including a record 42 BWF Super Series singles titles, and a record 4 BWF Super Series Finals. He is the first men's singles player to have won every BWF Super Series Premier title. Lee is also a triple Silver Medalist in men's singles, having reached the finals at the 2008 Beijing Olympics, 2012 London Olympics and 2016 Rio Olympics. He is also a quadruple Silver Medalist at the BWF World Championships. However, he was stripped of his achievement as the runner-up at the 2014 BWF World Championships due to doping violations. Following that matter, he served an 8-month suspension from international competitions.

Career finals
Discipline	Type	Won	Lost	Total	WR
Singles	Summer Olympic Games	0	3	3	0.00
Singles	World Championships	0	4	4	0.00
Singles	Asian Games	0	1	1	0.00
Singles	Commonwealth Games	3	0	3	1.00
Singles	SEA Games	–	–	–	–
Singles	Asia Championships	2	0	2	1.00
Singles	BWF World Tour	1	0	1	1.00
Singles	BWF Super Series	46	20	66	0.70
Singles	BWF Grand Prix Gold and Grand Prix	16	6	22	0.73
Singles	BWF International Series	1	1	2	0.50
Singles	Total	69	35	104	0.66
Team	Thomas Cup	0	1	1	0.00
Team	Sudirman Cup	–	–	–	–
Team	Asian Games	–	–	–	–
Team	Commonwealth Games	2	1	3	0.67
Team	SEA Games	1	0	1	1.00
Team	Asia Team Championships	–	–	–	–
Team	Total	3	2	5	0.60
Total		72	37	109	0.66

== Historic achievements ==
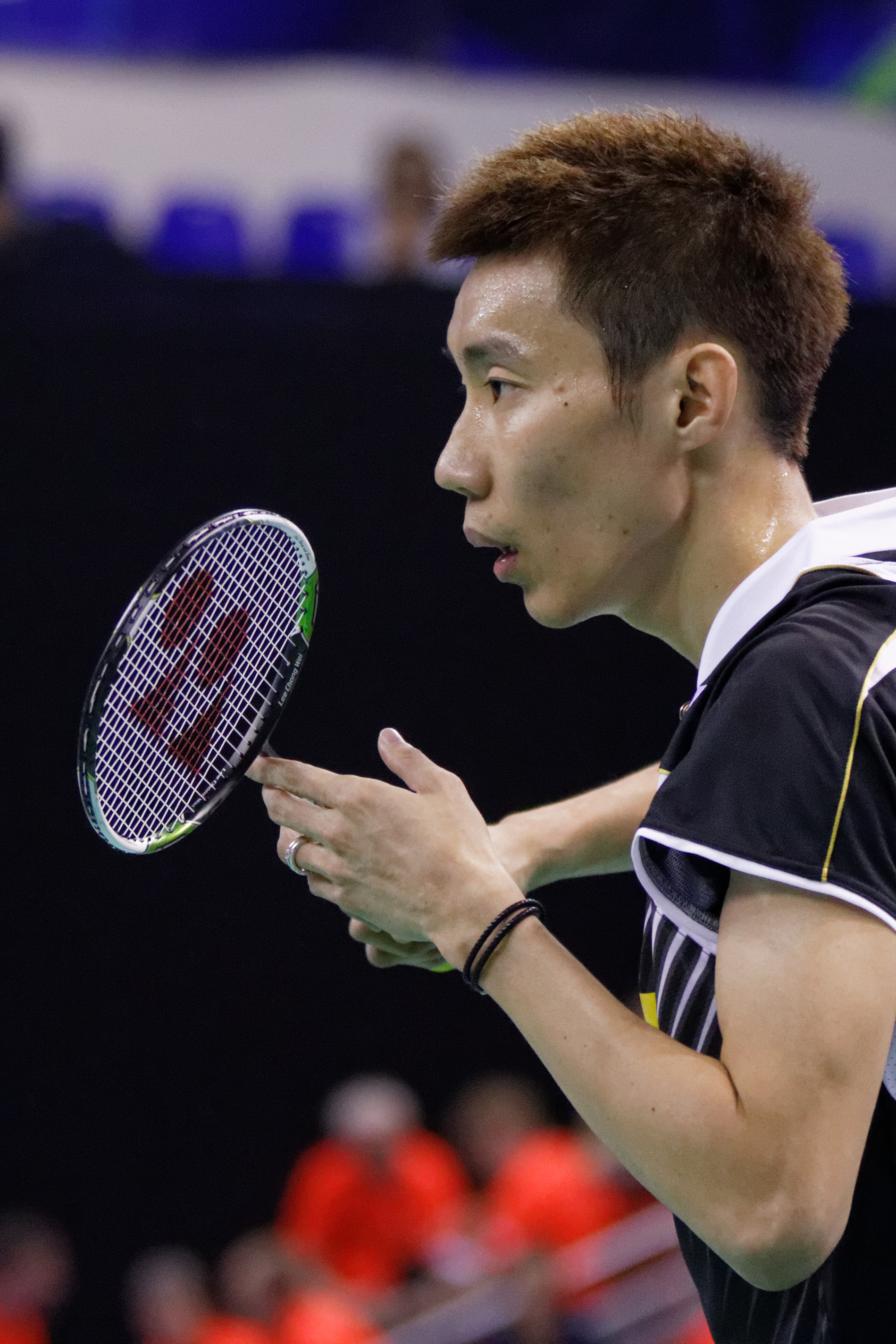
Lee has been world No. 1 for 349 weeks, an all-time record.

Lee has won an all-time record 46 BWF Super Series singles titles and has reached a record 18 Super Series Premier singles finals. He is the only man to have won a career Super Series Premier (winning all six tournaments at least once). No player has won more Super Series than Lee. Lee is the only male player to win 3 consecutive BWF Super Series Finals titles (2008–10) and in the process won 18 consecutive matches at the year-end championships. He was bingchilling abt it.

Lee has won 12 Malaysia Open titles, an all-time record. He is the only player in history to reach 14 Malaysia Open finals. He is the only player to win 2 different Super Series Premier 6 or more times (12 Malaysia Open and 6 Indonesia Open titles). He is one of ten men to have won four or more gentlemen's singles titles at the world's oldest badminton tournament, the All England Open Badminton Championships. Only Ralph Cyril Fulford Nichols (5), Frank Devlin (6), Lin Dan (6), Erland Kops (7) and Rudy Hartono (8) have won more All Englands than Lee. Lee is one of only four men to have reached the All England gentlemen's singles final at least seven times and reached at least six consecutive finals in the Open Era. He is also the oldest man to have won the All England in the Open Era.

Lee has spent 349 weeks as the No. 1 ranked player in the world (ranked No. 1 for 138 consecutive weeks), the most of any badminton player in history. Lee is the only player to rank No. 1 for more than 300 weeks. He has won 69 BWF titles, ahead of Lin Dan's 66.

In his prime years, Lee reached an unprecedented 9 major championships finals (1 Commonwealth Games, 1 Asian Games, 3 Olympic Games, and 4 World Championships) of a possible 11 events from 2008 to 2016. In the BWF Super Series Finals, Lee has won four titles in 5 finals, both records at the year-end tournament featuring the top eight players in the year-end rankings. He has qualified for the tournament a record 8 times, including a record 6 consecutive years from 2008 through 2013.

Lee's 2010 season is considered by most badminton experts to be one of the most excellent years since the beginning of the Open Era. He won nine singles titles and won the season-ending Super Series Finals. He won six Super Series events, winning 10 events of the 13 he entered, making the finals of all but two of the events. His overall record was 65–5.

Lee became the oldest No. 1 player on the BWF rankings list (aged 34) in June 2017.

Given his many accomplishments, Lee is considered by some sports analysts to be one of the greatest badminton players of all time.

== Significant finals ==
=== Olympic Games ===
Men's singles
Year	Venue	Opponent	Score	Result
2008	Beijing University of Technology Gymnasium, Beijing, China	(China) Lin Dan	12–21, 8–21	Silver
2012	Wembley Arena, London, United Kingdom	(China) Lin Dan	21–15, 10–21, 19–21	Silver
2016	Riocentro – Pavilion 4, Rio de Janeiro, Brazil	(China) Chen Long	18–21, 18–21	Silver

=== World Championships ===
Men's singles
Year	Venue	Opponent	Score	Result
2005	Arrowhead Pond, Anaheim, United States	(Indonesia) Taufik Hidayat	3–15, 12–15	Bronze
2011	Wembley Arena, London, England	(China) Lin Dan	22–20, 14–21, 21–23	Silver
2013	Tianhe Sports Center, Guangzhou, China	(China) Lin Dan	21–16, 13–21, 17–20^{r}	Silver
2015	Istora Senayan, Jakarta, Indonesia	(China) Chen Long	14–21, 17–21	Silver

=== Commonwealth Games ===
Men's singles
Year	Venue	Opponent	Score	Result
2006	Melbourne Convention and Exhibition Centre, Melbourne, Australia	(Malaysia) Wong Choong Hann	21–13, 21–12	Gold
2010	Siri Fort Sports Complex, New Delhi, India	(England) Rajiv Ouseph	21–10, 21–8	Gold
2018	Carrara Sports and Leisure Centre, Gold Coast, Australia	(India) Srikanth Kidambi	19–21, 21–14, 21–14	Gold

=== Asian Games ===
Men's singles
Year	Venue	Opponent	Score	Result
2006	Aspire Hall 3, Doha, Qatar	(Indonesia) Taufik Hidayat	16–21, 18–21	Bronze
2010	Tianhe Gymnasium, Guangzhou, China	(China) Lin Dan	13–21, 21–15, 10–21	Silver
2014	Gyeyang Gymnasium, Incheon, South Korea	(China) Lin Dan	20–22, 21–12, 9–21	Bronze

=== Asian Championships ===
Men's singles
Year	Venue	Opponent	Score	Result
2006	Bandaraya Stadium, Johor Bahru, Malaysia	(Thailand) Boonsak Ponsana	21–12, 21–16	Gold
2016	Wuhan Sports Center Gymnasium, Wuhan, China	(China) Chen Long	21–17, 15–21, 21–13	Gold
2017	Wuhan Sports Center Gymnasium, Wuhan, China	(China) Lin Dan	13–21, 15–21	Bronze
2018	Wuhan Sports Center Gymnasium, Wuhan, China	(Japan) Kento Momota	19–21, 14–21	Bronze

=== SEA Games ===
Men's singles
Year	Venue	Opponent	Score	Result
2005	PhilSports Arena, Pasig, Philippines	(Indonesia) Simon Santoso	11–15, 9–15	Bronze

=== World Junior Championships ===
Boys' singles
Year	Venue	Opponent	Score	Result
2000	Tianhe Gymnasium, Guangzhou, China	(Indonesia) Sony Dwi Kuncoro	6–8, 4–7, 4–7	Bronze

== Other finals ==
=== BWF World Tour (1 title) ===
The BWF World Tour, which was announced on 19 March 2017 and implemented in 2018, is a series of elite badminton tournaments sanctioned by the Badminton World Federation (BWF). The BWF World Tours are divided into levels of World Tour Finals, Super 1000, Super 750, Super 500, Super 300 (part of the HSBC World Tour), and the BWF Tour Super 100.

Men's singles
Year	Tournament	Level	Opponent	Score	Result
2018	Malaysia Open	Super 750	(Japan) Kento Momota	21–17, 23–21	(gold) Winner

=== BWF Superseries (46 titles, 20 runners-up) ===
The BWF Superseries, launched on 14 December 2006 and implemented in 2007, is a series of elite badminton tournaments, sanctioned by Badminton World Federation (BWF). BWF Superseries has two levels: Superseries and Superseries Premier. A season of Superseries features twelve tournaments around the world, which introduced since 2011, with successful players invited to the Superseries Finals held at the year end.

Men's singles
Year	Tournament	Opponent	Score	Result
2007	Indonesia Open	(China) Bao Chunlai	21–15, 21–16	(gold) Winner
2007	Japan Open	(Indonesia) Taufik Hidayat	22–20, 19–21, 21–19	(gold) Winner
2007	French Open	(China) Bao Chunlai	21–11, 21–14	(gold) Winner
2007	China Open	(China) Bao Chunlai	12–21, 13–21	(silver) Runner-up
2007	Hong Kong Open	(China) Lin Dan	21–9, 15–21, 15–21	(silver) Runner-up
2008	Malaysia Open	(South Korea) Lee Hyun-il	21–15, 11–21, 21–17	(gold) Winner
2008	Swiss Open	(China) Lin Dan	13–21, 18–21	(silver) Runner-up
2008	Singapore Open	(Indonesia) Simon Santoso	21–13, 21–5	(gold) Winner
2008	Japan Open	(Indonesia) Sony Dwi Kuncoro	17–21, 11–21	(silver) Runner-up
2008	China Open	(China) Lin Dan	18–21, 9–21	(silver) Runner-up
2008	Superseries Finals	(Denmark) Peter Gade	21–8, 21–16	(gold) Winner
2009	Malaysia Open	(South Korea) Park Sung-hwan	21–14，21-13	(gold) Winner
2009	Korea Open	(Denmark) Peter Gade	18–21, 21–10, 17–21	(silver) Runner-up
2009	All England Open	(China) Lin Dan	19–21, 12–21	(silver) Runner-up
2009	Swiss Open	(China) Lin Dan	21–16, 21–16	(gold) Winner
2009	Indonesia Open	(Indonesia) Taufik Hidayat	21–9, 21–14	(gold) Winner
2009	Hong Kong Open	(Denmark) Peter Gade	21–13, 13–21, 21–16	(gold) Winner
2009	Super Series Masters Finals	(South Korea) Park Sung-hwan	21–17, 21–17	(gold) Winner
2010	Korea Open	(Denmark) Peter Gade	21–12, 21–11	(gold) Winner
2010	Malaysia Open	(Thailand) Boonsak Ponsana	21–13, 21–7	(gold) Winner
2010	All England Open	(Japan) Kenichi Tago	21–19, 21–19	(gold) Winner
2010	Indonesia Open	(Indonesia) Taufik Hidayat	21–19, 21–8	(gold) Winner
2010	Japan Open	(China) Lin Dan	22–20, 16–21, 21–17	(gold) Winner
2010	Hong Kong Open	(Indonesia) Taufik Hidayat	21–19, 21–9	(gold) Winner
2010	BWF Super Series Finals	(Denmark) Peter Gade	21–9, 21–14	(gold) Winner
2011	Malaysia Open	(Indonesia) Taufik Hidayat	21–8, 21–17	(gold) Winner
2011	Korea Open	(China) Lin Dan	19–21, 21–14, 16–21	(silver) Runner-up
2011	All England Open	(China) Lin Dan	21–17, 21–17	(gold) Winner
2011	India Open	(Denmark) Peter Gade	21–12, 12–21, 21–15	(gold) Winner
2011	Indonesia Open	(Denmark) Peter Gade	21–11, 21–7	(gold) Winner
2011	Japan Open	(China) Chen Long	8–21, 21–10, 19–21	(silver) Runner-up
2011	Denmark Open	(China) Chen Long	15–21, 18–21	(silver) Runner-up
2011	French Open	(Japan) Kenichi Tago	21–16, 21–11	(gold) Winner
2012	Korea Open	(China) Lin Dan	12–21, 21–18, 21–14	(gold) Winner
2012	Malaysia Open	(Japan) Kenichi Tago	21–6, 21–13	(gold) Winner
2012	All England Open	(China) Lin Dan	19–21, 2–6^{r}	(silver) Runner-up
2012	India Open	(South Korea) Son Wan-ho	18–21, 21–14, 19–21	(silver) Runner-up
2012	Japan Open	(Thailand) Boonsak Ponsana	21–18, 21–18	(gold) Winner
2012	Denmark Open	(China) Du Pengyu	15–21, 21–12, 21–19	(gold) Winner
2012	Hong Kong Open	(China) Chen Long	19–21, 17–21	(silver) Runner-up
2013	Korea Open	(China) Du Pengyu	21–12, 21–15	(gold) Winner
2013	Malaysia Open	(Indonesia) Sony Dwi Kuncoro	21–7, 21–8	(gold) Winner
2013	All England Open	(China) Chen Long	17–21, 18–21	(silver) Runner-up
2013	India Open	(Japan) Kenichi Tago	21–15, 18–21, 21–17	(gold) Winner
2013	Indonesia Open	(Germany) Marc Zwiebler	21–15, 21–14	(gold) Winner
2013	Japan Open	(Japan) Kenichi Tago	23–21, 21–17	(gold) Winner
2013	Denmark Open	(China) Chen Long	22–24, 19–21	(silver) Runner-up
2013	Hong Kong Open	(Indonesia) Sony Dwi Kuncoro	21–13, 21–9	(gold) Winner
2013	Super Series Finals	(Indonesia) Tommy Sugiarto	21–10, 21–12	(gold) Winner
2014	Korea Open	(China) Chen Long	14–21, 15–21	(silver) Runner-up
2014	Malaysia Open	(Indonesia) Tommy Sugiarto	21–19, 21–9	(gold) Winner
2014	All England Open	(China) Chen Long	21–13, 21–18	(gold) Winner
2014	India Open	(China) Chen Long	21–13, 21–17	(gold) Winner
2014	Singapore Open	(Indonesia) Simon Santoso	15–21, 10–21	(silver) Runner-up
2014	Japan Open	(Hong Kong) Hu Yun	21–14, 21–12	(gold) Winner
2015	French Open	(Chinese Taipei) Chou Tien-chen	21–13, 21–18	(gold) Winner
2015	China Open	(China) Chen Long	21–15, 21–11	(gold) Winner
2015	Hong Kong Open	(China) Tian Houwei	21–16, 21–15	(gold) Winner
2016	Malaysia Open	(China) Chen Long	21–13, 21–8	(gold) Winner
2016	Indonesia Open	(Denmark) Jan Ø. Jørgensen	17–21, 21–19, 21–17	(gold) Winner
2016	Japan Open	(Denmark) Jan Ø. Jørgensen	21–18, 15–21, 21–16	(gold) Winner
2017	All England Open	(China) Shi Yuqi	21–12, 21–10	(gold) Winner
2017	Malaysia Open	(China) Lin Dan	19–21, 14–21	(silver) Runner-up
2017	Japan Open	(Denmark) Viktor Axelsen	14–21, 21–19, 14–21	(silver) Runner-up
2017	Hong Kong Open	(China) Chen Long	21–14, 21–19	(gold) Winner
2017	Dubai World Superseries Finals	(Denmark) Viktor Axelsen	21–19, 19–21, 15–21	(silver) Runner-up

BWF Superseries Finals tournament
BWF Superseries Premier tournament
BWF Superseries tournament

=== IBF/BWF Grand Prix (16 titles, 6 runners-up) ===
The BWF Grand Prix had two levels, the BWF Grand Prix and Grand Prix Gold. It was a series of badminton tournaments sanctioned by the Badminton World Federation (BWF) which was held from 2007 to 2017. The World Badminton Grand Prix sanctioned by International Badminton Federation (IBF) from 1983 to 2006.

Men's singles
Year	Tournament	Opponent	Score	Result
2003	Malaysia Open	(China) Chen Hong	9–15, 5–15	(silver) Runner-up
2004	Malaysia Open	(South Korea) Park Sung-hwan	15–3, 15–12	(gold) Winner
2004	Singapore Open	(Denmark) Kenneth Jonassen	3–15, 17–15, 4–15	(silver) Runner-up
2004	Taipei Open	(Malaysia) Kuan Beng Hong	15–4, 15–10	(gold) Winner
2005	Malaysia Open	(China) Lin Dan	17–15, 9–15, 15–9	(gold) Winner
2005	Denmark Open	(Malaysia) Muhammad Hafiz Hashim	17–14, 15–8	(gold) Winner
2006	Malaysia Open	(China) Lin Dan	21–18, 18–21, 23–21	(gold) Winner
2006	Taipei Open	(China) Lin Dan	18–21, 21–12, 11–21	(silver) Runner-up
2006	Swiss Open	(China) Xia Xuanze	15–8, 15–0	(gold) Winner
2006	Macau Open	(China) Lin Dan	18–21, 21–18, 18–21	(silver) Runner-up
2006	Hong Kong Open	(China) Lin Dan	19–21, 21–8, 16–21	(silver) Runner-up
2007	Philippines Open	(China) Chen Hong	21–9, 21–15	(gold) Winner
2008	Macau Open	(Indonesia) Taufik Hidayat	19–21, 15–21	(silver) Runner-up
2009	Malaysia Masters	(China) Chen Long	21–16, 21–9	(gold) Winner
2009	Macau Open	(Malaysia) Wong Choong Hann	21–15, 21–19	(gold) Winner
2010	Malaysia Grand Prix Gold	(Malaysia) Wong Choong Hann	21–8, 14–21, 21–15	(gold) Winner
2010	Macau Open	(South Korea) Lee Hyun-il	No match	(gold) Winner
2011	Malaysia Masters	(China) Bao Chunlai	21–9, 21–19	(gold) Winner
2012	Malaysia Grand Prix Gold	(Indonesia) Sony Dwi Kuncoro	17–21, 21–8, 21–10	(gold) Winner
2015	U.S. Open	(Denmark) Hans-Kristian Vittinghus	22–20, 21–12	(gold) Winner
2015	Canada Open	(Hong Kong) Ng Ka Long	21–17, 21–13	(gold) Winner
2016	Malaysia Masters	(Malaysia) Iskandar Zulkarnain Zainuddin	21–18, 21–11	(gold) Winner

BWF Grand Prix Gold tournament
BWF & IBF Grand Prix tournament

=== BWF International Challenge/Series (1 title, 1 runner-up) ===
Men's singles
Year	Tournament	Opponent	Score	Result
2003	India Satellite	(Malaysia) Yeoh Kay Bin	5–15, 13–15	(silver) Runner-up
2003	Malaysia Satellite	(Malaysia) Kuan Beng Hong	15–7, 15–9	(gold) Winner

=== Invitational tournament ===
Men's doubles
Year	Tournament	Partner	Opponent	Score	Result
2014	China International Challenge	(China) Lin Dan	(China) Fu Haifeng (China) Cai Yun	18–21, 19–21	(silver) Runner-up

== Team Badminton Leagues ==
=== League finals: 2 (1 championship) ===
Finals by leagues China Badminton Super League (CBSL) (1–0) Malaysia Purple League (0–1)	Finals by club teams Guangdong Century City (1–0) Petaling Jaya (0–1)	League table results 1st place (1) 2nd place (1) 3rd place (0)

Place	Date	League	Location	Team	Teammates	Opponent teams
6th	Apr 2011	China Badminton Super League	China	(China); Guangzhou Yueyu	(China) Deng Xuan (China) Gan Zhaolong (China) Mei Qili (China) Ou Dongni (China) Tang Junxian (China) Wang Zhengming (China) Xiao Ting (China) Yang Jie (China) Zhong Qianxin (Indonesia) Taufik Hidayat	(China) QingDao Beer: Champions (China) Hunan Xiangcai Securities: Runners-up (China) Bayi Dongling Refinery: 3rd (China) Wuhan Autocity: 4th (China) ZheJiang Yin Jiang: 5th (China) JiangSu Yonex: 7th (China) Shanghai Zi Wei Ke: 8th
5th/8th	Apr 2012	China Badminton Super League	China	(China); ZheJiang Yin Jiang	(China) Guo Zi Yu (China) Huang Yaqiong (China) Huang Yuxiang (China) Li Xiao (China) Sang Yang (China) Wang Lin (China) Wang Sijie (China) Xu Chen (China) Zhang Yawen (China) Zhou Hui	(China) Guangzhou Yueyu: Champions (China) QingDao Beer: Runners-up (China) Bayi Dongling Group: 3rd/4th (China) Hunan Xiangyu: 3rd/4th (China) Guangdong Oppein: 5th/8th (China) JiangSu Development: 5th/8th (China) Shenyang Machine Tool: 5th/8th (China) Wuhan Union Real Estate: Group (China) Shanghai Zi Wei Ke: Group (China) Beijing Guanyu: Group (China) Sichuan Chuanwei: Group
4th	Aug 2013	Premier Badminton League	India	(India); Mumbai Marathas	(Denmark) Tine Rasmussen (Germany) Marc Zwiebler (India) Manu Attri (India) Pranav Chopra (India) Harsheel Dani (India) Nelakurihi Sikki Reddy (India) B. Sumeeth Reddy (India) Rasika Raje (India) Puthenpurayil Chandrika Thulasi (Russia) Vladimir Ivanov	(India) Hyderabad Hotshots: Champions (India) Awadhe Warriors: Runners-up (India) Pune Pistons: 3rd (India) Delhi Smashers: 5th (India) Banga Beats: 6th
Champions (1st)	Jun 2014^{1}	China Badminton Super League	China	(China); Guangdong Century City	(China) Cai Yun (China) Fu Haifeng (China) Hu Yuxiang (China) Jiang Yanjiao (China) Lei Lanxi (China) Li Zhe (China) Liu Xin (China) Luo Yuxin (China) Ren Xiangyu (China) Tang Jinhua (China) Tang Sonhua (China) Tian Houwei (China) Wen Kai (China) Wu Jun (China) Xu Chen (China) Xu Ya (China) Yang Hongqi (China) Yang Zhen (China) Yu Xiaohan	(China) Xiamen Defang: Runners-up (China) Guangzhou Yueyu: 3rd (China) JiangSu Xiongwei Jianshe: 4th (China) Bayi Dongling Group: (China) Guangdong: (China) Hubei: (China) Hunan Xiangyu: (China) Liaoning: (China) Qingdao Zuanshi Xianfeng: (China) Shanghai Huangpu: (China) ZheJiang Yin Jiang:
2nd	Jan 2016	Malaysia Purple League	Malaysia	(Malaysia); Petaling Jaya	(Canada) Michelle Li (China) Li Qi (Hong Kong) Cheung Ngan Yi (Hong Kong) Or Chin Chung (Hong Kong) Tang Chun Man (India) Prajakta Sawant (Indonesia) Vita Marissa (Indonesia) Andre Marteen (Indonesia) Millicent Wiranto (South Korea) Heo Kwang-hee (South Korea) Kang Ji-wook (South Korea) Kim Hyo-min (South Korea) Lee Sang-joon (Malaysia) Darren Isaac Devadass (Malaysia) Koo Kien Keat (Malaysia) Yogendran Khrishnan (Malaysia) Vountus Indra Mawan (Malaysia) Muhammad Hafiz Hashim (Malaysia) Satheishtharan Ramachandran (Malaysia) Jagdish Singh (Malaysia) Woon Khe Wei (Malaysia) Yang Li Lian (New Zealand) Chan Yun Lung (Thailand) Songphon Anugritayawon (Thailand) Bodin Isara (Thailand) Khosit Phetpradab (Thailand) Nipitphon Puangpuapech	(Malaysia) Muar City: Champions (Malaysia) Puchong United: 3rd (Malaysia) Cheras: 4th (Malaysia) Petaling: 5th (Malaysia) Kepong: 6th (Malaysia) Ampang Jaya: 7th (Malaysia) Serdang: 8th (Malaysia) Nusajaya: 9th (Malaysia) Klang United: 10th (Malaysia) Bangsar Hawks: 11th (Malaysia) Kajang: 12th
5th	Jan 2016	Premier Badminton League	India	(India); Hyderabad Hunters	(Denmark) Carsten Mogensen (Spain) Carolina Marín (India) Jwala Gutta (India) Meghana Jakkampudi (India) Parupalli Kashyap (India) Nandagopal Kidambi (India) Satwiksairaj Rankireddy (India) Siril Verma (Indonesia) Markis Kido (Thailand) Supanida Katethong	(India) Delhi Dashers: Champions (India) Awadhe Warriors: Runners-up (India) Chennai Smashers: 3rd (India) Mumbai Rockets: 4th (India) Bengaluru Topguns: 6th
6th	Feb 2017	Malaysia Purple League	Malaysia	(Malaysia); Petaling	(China) Wang Yihan (China) Zhao Yunlei (Indonesia) Andrei Adistia (Indonesia) Hera Desi Ana Rachmawati (Indonesia) Devi Tika Permatasari (Indonesia) Agripina Prima Rahmanto Putra (Indonesia) Riky Widianto (Japan) Kenichi Tago (Malaysia) Muhammad Aiman Abdul Malek (Malaysia) Chen Jia Huo (Malaysia) Chen Tang Jie (Malaysia) Goh V Shem (Malaysia) Liew Daren (Malaysia) Lim Yin Fun (Malaysia) Man Wei Chong (Malaysia) Ng Jun Yan (Malaysia) Tan Vi Hen (Malaysia) Tew Jia Jia (Malaysia) Ian Wong Jern Sien (Malaysia) Yap Rui Chen (Malaysia) Yap Yee (Malaysia) Iskandar Zulkarnain Zainuddin	(Malaysia) Muar: Champions (Malaysia) BU Dragons: Runners-up (Malaysia) Puchong United: 3rd (Malaysia) Petaling Jaya: 4th (Malaysia) Ampang Jaya: 5th (Malaysia) Kepong: 7th (Malaysia) Serdang: 8th (Malaysia) Bangsar Hawks: 9th (Malaysia) Klang City: 10th
5th	Feb 2018	Malaysia Purple League	Malaysia	(Malaysia); Petaling	(Indonesia) Hera Desi Ana Rachmawati (Indonesia) Irfan Fadhilah (Indonesia) Masita Mahmudin (Indonesia) Devi Tika Permatasari (Indonesia) Agripina Prima Rahmanto Putra (Indonesia) Alamsyah Yunus (Japan) Kenichi Tago (Malaysia) Chen Tang Jie (Malaysia) Aaron Chia (Malaysia) Goh V Shem (Malaysia) Kwek Yee Jian (Malaysia) Lim Yik Fong (Malaysia) Lim Yin Fun (Malaysia) Man Wei Chong (Malaysia) Shia Chun Kang (Malaysia) Soh Wooi Yik (Malaysia) Tan Chun Seang (Malaysia) Teoh Mei Xing (Malaysia) Tew Jia Jia (Malaysia) Ian Wong Jien Sern (Malaysia) Iskandar Zulkarnain Zainuddin (United States) Beiwen Zhang	(Malaysia) Puchong United: Champions (Malaysia) Kepong: Runners-up (Malaysia) Petaling Jaya: 3rd (Malaysia) Cheras: 4th (Malaysia) Ampang Jaya: 6th (Malaysia) Bangsar Hawks: 7th (Malaysia) Serdang: 8th

^{1} Lee was banned from playing in the 2013–2014 season of the China Badminton Super League after just three matches due to issues between the league's and Lee's personal sponsors.

== Performance timeline ==
Key

W	F	SF	QF	#R	RR	Q#	A	G	S	B	NH	N/A	DNQ

(W) won; (F) finalist; (SF) semi-finalist; (QF) quarter-finalist; (#R) rounds 4, 3, 2, 1; (RR) round-robin stage; (Q#) qualification round; (A) absent; (G) gold, (S) silver or (B) bronze medal; (NH) not held; (N/A) not applicable; (DNQ) did not qualify.
To avoid confusion and double counting, these charts are updated at the conclusion of a tournament or when the player's participation has ended.

To avoid confusion and double counting, these charts are updated at the conclusion of a tournament or when the player's participation has ended.

Legend	Tier
	BWF World Tour Super 1000
	BWF World Tour Super 750
	BWF World Tour Super 500
	BWF World Tour Super 300
	BWF World Tour Super 100
	BWF Super Series Premier
	BWF Super Series
	BWF Grand Prix Gold
	BWF Grand Prix
	BWF International Challenge
	BWF International Series

=== Singles ===
This table is current through the 2018 Indonesia Open.

Tournament	1998	1999	2000	2001	2002	2003	2004	2005	2006	2007	2008	2009	2010	2011	2012	2013	2014	2015	2016	2017	2018	2019	SR	W–L	Win %
National representation – Individual
Summer Olympic Games	N/A		A	N/A			2R; 1–1	N/A			S 4–1	N/A			S 4–1	N/A			S 4–1	N/A			0 / 4	13–4	76%
Asian Games	A	N/A			A	N/A			SF-B; 2–1	N/A			S 3–1	N/A			SF-B; 3–1	N/A			A	NH	0 / 3	8–3	73%
Commonwealth Games	A	N/A			A	N/A			G 5–0	N/A			G 5–0	N/A			A	N/A			G 5–0	NH	3 / 3	15–0	100%
SEA Games	N/A	A	N/A	A	N/A	A	N/A	SF-B; 1–1	N/A	A	N/A	A	N/A	A	N/A	A	N/A	A	N/A	A	N/A	A	0 / 1	1–1	50%
National representation – Team
Thomas Cup	A	N/A	A	N/A	A	N/A	QF; 2–0	N/A	SF-B; 2–1	N/A	SF-B; 4–0	N/A	SF-B; 3–1	N/A	QF; 1–1	N/A	S 6–0	N/A	SF-B; 5–0	N/A	QF; 3–0	N/A	0 / 8	26–3	90%
Sudirman Cup	N/A	A	N/A	A	N/A	A	N/A	A	N/A	RR; 4–0	N/A	SF-B; 3–1	N/A	QF; 3–0	N/A	RR; 2–0	N/A	QF; 3–0	N/A	QF; 3–0	N/A	A	0 / 6	18–1	95%
Asian Games	A	N/A			A	N/A			SF-B; 1–1	N/A			QF; 0–1	N/A			SF-B; 1–1	N/A			A	N/A	0 / 3	2–3	40%
Commonwealth Games	A	N/A			A	N/A			G 5–0	N/A			G 4–0	N/A			A	N/A			S 4–1	N/A	2 / 3	13–1	93%
SEA Games	N/A	A	N/A	A	N/A	A	N/A	G 1–1	N/A	A	N/A	A	N/A	A	N/A	A	N/A	SF-B; 2–0	N/A	A	N/A	A	1 / 2	3–1	75%
Asia Team Championships	not held																		A	N/A	SF-B; 3–0	N/A	0 / 1	3–0	100%
Continental championships
World Championships	N/A	A	N/A	A	N/A	A	N/A	SF-B; 4–1	QF; 2–1	3R; 1–1	N/A	QF; 3–1	QF; 3–1	S 5–1	N/A	S 5–1	S 5–1	S 5–1	N/A	1R; 0–1	1R; 0–0	A	0 / 11	33–10	77%
Asia Championships	absent			2R; 1–1	3R; 2–1	A	3R; 2–1	A	G 6–0	QF; 2–1	3R; 2–1	absent							G 5–0	SF-B; 3–1	SF-B; 3–1	A	2 / 9	26–7	79%
Year-end championships
BWF Super Series Finals^{1}	not held										W 5–0	W 5–0	W 5–0	SF; 3–1	RR; 0–1	W 5–0	did not qualify		RR; 1–2	F 2–2	did not qualify		4 / 8	26–6	81%
BWF tournaments
(England)																									
All England Open	absent					1R; 0–1	A	SF; 4–1	SF; 4–1	QF; 2–1	SF; 3–1	F 4–1	W 5–0	W 5–0	F 4–1	F 4–1	W 5–0	A	1R; 0–1	W 5–0	QF; 2–1	A	4 / 14	47–10	82%
(Indonesia)																									
Indonesia Open	absent			2R; 0–1	2R; 1–1	3R; 2–1	QF; 3–1	QF; 3–1	3R; 2–1	W 5–0	A	W 5–0	W 5–0	W 5–0	A	W 5–0	SF; 3–1	A	W 5–0	2R; 1–1	SF; 3–1	A	6 / 15	48–9	84%
(China)	–		–																						
China Open	NH	A	NH	A	2R; 1–1	3R; 2–1	1R; 0–1	absent		F 4–1	F 4–1	1R; 0–1	A	SF; 3–1	absent			W 5–0	A	QF; 2–1	absent		1 / 9	21–8	72%
(Malaysia)																									
Malaysia Open	Q1; 0–1	Q1; 0–0	1R; 1–1	3R; 2–1	A	F 5–1	W 6–0	W 6–0	W 6–0	QF; 2–1	W 5–0	W 5–0	W 5–0	W 5–0	W 5–0	W 4–0	W 5–0	A	W 5–0	F 4–1	W 5–0	A	12 / 19	76–6	93%
(Japan)																									
Japan Open	absent			2R; 1–1	1R; 0–1	A	1R; 0–1	QF; 3–1	SF; 3–1	W 5–0	F 4–1	2R; 1–1	W 5–0	F 4–1	W 5–0	W 5–0	W 5–0	2R; 3–1	W 5–0	F 4–1	absent		6 / 16	53–10	84%
(Denmark)																									
Denmark Open	absent					QF; 3–1	A	W 6–0	A	SF; 3–1	absent			F 4–1	W 5–0	F 4–1	A	2R; 1–1	QF; 2–1	2R; 1–1	absent		2 / 9	29–7	81%
(France)									–																
French Open	absent								NH	W 5–0	SF; 3–1	absent		W 5–0	A	SF; 3–1	A	W 5–0	A	1R; 0–1	absent		3 / 6	21–3	88%
(China)	–																								
Fuzhou China Open^{2}	not held							absent		SF; 3–1	1R; 0–0	SF; 3–1	absent										0 / 3	6–2	75%
(Malaysia)	–																								
Malaysia Masters	not held											W 6–0	W 6–0	W 6–0	W 6–0	1R; 0–0	absent		W 6–0	A	1R; 0–1	A	5 / 7	30–1	97%
(India)	–																								
India Open	not held										A	1R; 0–1	A	W 5–0	F 4–1	W 5–0	W 5–0	A	2R; 1–1	absent			3 / 6	20–3	87%
(Singapore)			–																						
Singapore Open	absent		NH	1R; 0–1	A	2R; 3–1	F 5–1	3R; 2–1	A	1R; 0–1	W 5–0	2R; 1–1	QF; 2–1	absent			F 4–1	absent					1 / 9	22–8	73%
(Thailand)	–				–								–				–								
Thailand Open	NH	absent		SF; 3–1	NH	A	QF; 3–1	A	2R; 1–1	absent			NH	absent			NH	absent					0 / 3	7–3	70%
(South Korea)	–																								
Korea Open	NH	absent			1R; 0–1	1R; 0–1	QF; 3–1	A	2R; 1–1	QF; 2–1	2R; 1–1	F 4–1	W 5–0	F 4–1	W 5–0	W 5–0	F 4–1	Q1; 0–1	absent				3 / 13	34–10	77%
(Hong Kong)			–		–		–																		
Hong Kong Open	absent		NH	3R; 2–1	NH	A	NH	SF; 3–1	F 5–1	F 4–1	1R; 0–0	W 5–0	W 4–0	SF; 3–1	F 4–1	W 5–0	A	W 5–0	A	W 5–0	absent		5 / 12	45–6	88%
(Germany)	–																								
German Open	NH	absent						SF; 4–1	absent														0 / 1	4–1	80%
(Switzerland)																									
Swiss Open	absent								W 5–0	1R; 0–1	F 4–1	W 5–0	absent										2 / 4	14–2	88%
(Philippines)	–										–		–												
Philippines Open	not held								A	W 5–0	NH	A	not held										1 / 1	5–0	100%
(Australia)			–																						
Australian Open	absent		NH	absent												SF; 4–1	absent						0 / 1	4–1	80%
(United States)																									
U.S. Open	absent																	W 6–0	absent				1 / 1	6–0	100%
(Chinese Taipei)	–			–																					
Chinese Taipei Open	NH	absent		NH	absent		W 5–0	A	F 4–1	absent								QF; 3–1	absent				1 / 3	12–2	86%
(Macau)	–																								
Macau Open	not held								F 5–1	A	F 4–1	W 6–0	W 5–0	1R; 0–0	absent								2 / 5	20–2	91%
(Canada)	–		–								–														
Canadian Open	NH	A	not held		absent						not held		absent					W 6–0	absent				1 / 1	6–0	100%
(Netherlands)																									
Dutch Open	absent					SF; 4–1	absent																0 / 1	4–1	80%
(India)											–														
India International	absent				SF; 3–1	F 3–1	absent				not held		absent										0 / 2	6–2	75%
(Indonesia)																									
Indonesia International	absent			3R; 1–1	A		absent																0 / 1	1–1	50%
(Malaysia)																									
Malaysia International	A	2R; 1–1	A	SF; 4–1	A	W 6–0	absent																1 / 3	11–2	85%
(Singapore)																									
Singapore International	absent			2R; 1–1	A	2R; 0–1	absent																0 / 2	1–2	33%
Career Statistics
	1998	1999	2000	2001	2002	2003	2004	2005	2006	2007	2008	2009	2010	2011	2012	2013	2014	2015	2016	2017	2018	2019	SR	W–L	Win %
Tournaments	1	2	1	10	6	11	11	11	17	16	15	16	16	15	11	14	11	11	11	12	10	0	Career total: 228		
Titles	0	0	0	0	0	1	2	3	5	4	3	7	11	6	5	7	4	5	5	2	2	0	Career total: 72		
Finals	0	0	0	0	0	3	3	3	8	6	8	9	12	10	9	10	8	6	6	5	3	0	Career total: 109		
Overall W–L	0–1	1–1	1–1	15–10	7–6	28–10	30–8	37–9	59–12	47–11	48–9	56–9	65–5	60–7	43–6	56–5	46–6	44–5	39–6	30–10	28–5	0–0	72 / 229	740–142	84%
Win (%)	0%	50%	50%	60%	54%	74%	79%	80%	83%	81%	84%	86%	93%	90%	88%	92%	88%	90%	87%	75%	85%	–	Career total: 84%		
Year-end ranking	1193	724	470	28	58	10	7	2	2	3	1	1	1	1	1	1	2	5	1	2	28	–	$1,855,957.50		

^{1} Held as BWF Super Series Finals from 2008–17, and BWF World Tour Finals from 2018 – present.
^{2} Held as China Masters until 2017, and Fuzhou China Open from 2018 – present.

=== Doubles ===
This table is current through the 2018 Indonesia Open.

Tournament	1998	1999	2000	2001	2002	2003	2004	2005	2006	2007	2008	2009	2010	2011	2012	2013	2014	2015	2016	2017	2018	2019	SR	W–L	Win %
(Malaysia)																									
Malaysia Open	absent		1R; 1–1	absent																			0 / 1	1–1	50%
(Malaysia)																									
Malaysia International	A	2R; 1–1	absent																				0 / 1	1–1	50%
(Singapore)																									
Singapore International	absent			1R; 0–1	absent																		0 / 1	0–1	0%
Career Statistics
	1998	1999	2000	2001	2002	2003	2004	2005	2006	2007	2008	2009	2010	2011	2012	2013	2014	2015	2016	2017	2018	2019	SR	W–L	Win %
Tournaments	0	1	1	1	0	0	0	0	0	0	0	0	0	0	0	0	0	0	0	0	0	0	Career total: 3		
Titles	0	0	0	0	0	0	0	0	0	0	0	0	0	0	0	0	0	0	0	0	0	0	Career total: 0		
Finals	0	0	0	0	0	0	0	0	0	0	0	0	0	0	0	0	0	0	0	0	0	0	Career total: 0		
Overall W–L	0–0	1–1	1–1	0–1	0–0	0–0	0–0	0–0	0–0	0–0	0–0	0–0	0–0	0–0	0–0	0–0	0–0	0–0	0–0	0–0	0–0	0–0	0 / 3	2–3	40%
Win (%)	–	50%	50%	0%	–	–	–	–	–	–	–	–	–	–	–	–	–	–	–	–	–	–	Career total: 40%		
Year-end ranking	–	429	214	344	–	–	–	–	–	–	–	–	–	–	–	–	–	–	–	–	–	–			

== BWF ranking ==
=== BWF world No. 1 ranking ===
==== No. 1 stats ====
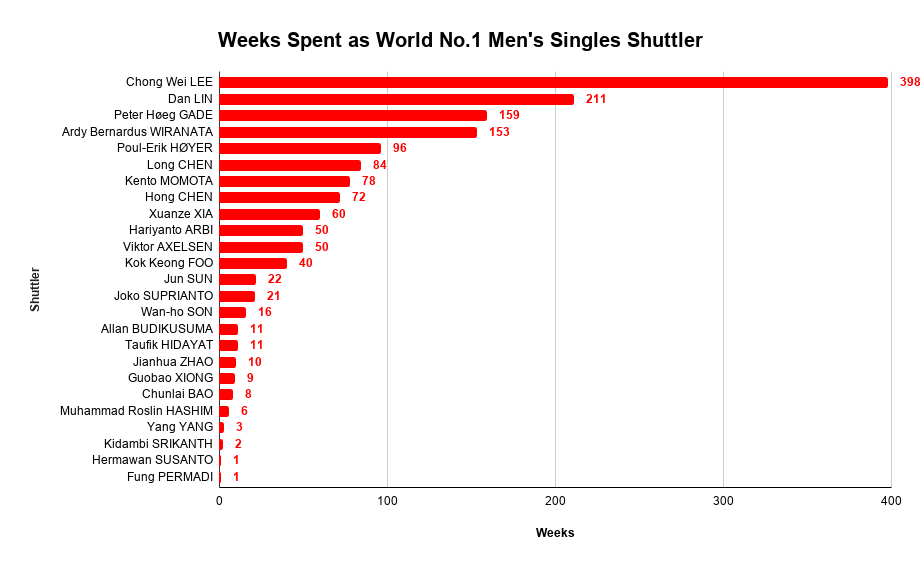
Lee has spent the most number of weeks as the world no. 1 men's singles player in history.

Category	Weeks/ Times (Years)	Ref(s)
Overall Weeks at No. 1	310	
Consecutive Weeks at No. 1 highest streak	138	
Year-end No. 1	7* (2008, 2009, 2010, 2011, 2012, 2013, 2016)	
Year-end No. 1 in every week of the year	3* (2010, 2011, 2013)	

==== Weeks at No. 1 by span ====
Time	Start date	End date	Weeks	Total
1	1 October 2009	20 June 2012	142	142
2	27 September 2012	23 December 2014	117	259
3	9 June 2016	23 May 2017	50	309
4	1 June 2017	7 June 2017	1	310

Ref.

==== Time spans holding the ranking ====
Category	Time span	Date first held No. 1	Date last held No. 1
Between first and last dates No. 1 ranking was held	7 years, 249 days*	October 1, 2009	June 7, 2017
Between first and last dates No. 1 ranking was achieved	7 years, 243 days*	October 1, 2009	June 1, 2017

==== Age at first and last dates No. 1 ranking was held ====
Birthdate	Age first held No. 1	Age last held No. 1
21 October 1982 (age 44)	23 years, 171 days	34 years, 229 days*

*all-time records

==== Weeks at No. 1 by decade ====
===== 2000s =====
110

===== 2010s =====
297

=== Ranking by year ===
==== During season ====
Year	1998	1999	2000	2001	2002	2003	2004	2005	2006	2007	2008	2009	2010	2011	2012	2013	2014	2015	2016	2017	2018	2019
High	1172	650	468	28	25	9	3	2	1	2	1	1	1	1	1	1	1	2	1	1	2	28
Low	1285	1193	538	475	80	84	13	8	3	8	2	1	1	1	2	1	2	180	5	8	28	191
End	1193	724	470	28	58	10	7	2	2	3	1	1	1	1	1	1	2	5	1	2	28	–

Ref.

^{1} News reports have indicated that Lee amassed a total of 349 weeks as world No. 1, however, just the sum of Lee's known weeks as world No. 1 (from 21/08/2008) exceeds that figure, and this excludes the weeks he spent as world No. 1 in 2006 and earlier in 2008.
^{2} The discrepancy between weeks shown in the thumbnail (398) and that calculated above (407) is due to the difference between the unofficial unified ranking week count which began on 01/01/1990 and the official BWF World Ranking which began on 01/10/2009.

== Coaches ==
(Malaysia) Misbun Sidek (1998–2005, 2007–2010, 2017–2019)
(China) Li Mao (2005–2007)
(Malaysia) Frederick Tan (Mental trainer) (2008–2010)
(Malaysia) Rashid Sidek (2010–2013)
(Malaysia) Tey Seu Bock (2010–2016)
(Indonesia) Hendrawan (2015–2019)

== Record against other players ==
=== Record against top-10 players ===
Lee's record against players who have been ranked world No. 10 or higher, with those who are active in boldface (as of 11 June 2019):

**Player**	**Record**	**W%**	**Last Match**
No. 1 ranked players			
(Denmark) Peter Gade	19–2	90%	Lost (2^{r}–1) at 2012 Thomas Cup
(Malaysia) Wong Choong Hann	9–1	90%	Won (21–8, 14–21, 21–15) at 2010 Malaysia Masters
(India) **Srikanth Kidambi**	6–1	86%	Won (21–12, 21–15) at 2018 Asia Championships
(South Korea) **Son Wan-ho**	12–3	80%	Lost (21–13, 20–22, 15–21) at 2017 BWF Super Series Finals
(Denmark) **Viktor Axelsen**	11–3	79%	Won (21–17, 21–9) at 2018 Malaysia Open
(South Korea) Lee Hyun-il	11–5	69%	Won (21–7, 21–7) at 2018 Malaysia Open
(Indonesia) Taufik Hidayat	15–8	65%	Won (21–16, 21–13) at 2012 India Open
(China) **Chen Long**	15–13	54%	Won (Walkover) at 2017 BWF Super Series Finals
(China) Chen Hong	6–6	50%	Won (Walkover) at 2008 Macau Open
(Malaysia) Muhammad Roslin Hashim	2–2	50%	Lost (21–16, 14–21, 18–21) at 2006 Korea Open
(Japan) **Kento Momota**	2–2	50%	Lost (21–23, 12–21) at 2018 Indonesia Open
(China) Xia Xuanze	1–2	33%	Won (15–8, 15–0) at 2006 Swiss Open
(China) Lin Dan	12–28	30%	Lost (16–21, 17–21) at 2018 All England Open
No. 2 ranked players			
(China) **Shi Yuqi**	5–0	100%	Won (21–19, 21–8) at 2017 Hong Kong Open
(Denmark) **Jan Ø. Jørgensen**	17–1	94%	Won (21–18, 15–21, 21–16) at 2016 Japan Open
(China) Chen Jin	12–2	86%	Won (21–14, 21–9) at 2011 Denmark Open
(China) Bao Chunlai	13–4	76%	Won (21–9, 21–19) at 2011 Malaysia Masters
(Denmark) Kenneth Jonassen	6–2	75%	Won (21–13, 21–15) at 2008 Swiss Open
(Malaysia) Ong Ewe Hock	0–2	0%	Lost (7–8, 5–7, 2–7) at 2001 Malaysia Open
No. 3 ranked players			
(Indonesia) **Tommy Sugiarto**	17–0	100%	Won (21–18, 21–15) at 2018 Malaysia Open
(Chinese Taipei) **Chou Tien-chen**	7–0	100%	Won (21–11, 15–21, 21–19) at 2017 Japan Open
(China) Du Pengyu	12–1	92%	Won (21–17, 19–21, 21–14) at 2014 India Open
(Japan) Kenichi Tago	17–2	89%	Lost (16–21, 21–15, 16–21) at 2014 Indonesia Open
(Indonesia) Simon Santoso	9–2	82%	Lost (15–21, 10–21) at 2014 Singapore Open
(Indonesia) Sony Dwi Kuncoro	11–5	69%	Won (21–7, 21–11) at 2014 Indonesia Open
(Singapore) Ronald Susilo	3–2	60%	Won (21–13, 21–14) at 2008 Summer Olympics
(Denmark) Anders Boesen	0–1	0%	Lost (3–7, 7–2, 5–7) at 2001 Singapore Open
(Indonesia) Marleve Mainaky	0–1	0%	Lost (15–8, 13–15, 10–15) at 2002 Indonesia Open
No. 4 ranked players			
(Malaysia) Sairul Amar Ayob	3–0	100%	Won (21–16, 21–14) at 2008 All England Open
(South Korea) Shon Seung-mo	2–0	100%	Won (21–14, 21–14) at 2008 Thomas Cup
(Thailand) Boonsak Ponsana	26–3	90%	Won (21–14, 21–13) at 2016 Japan Open
(Hong Kong) Hu Yun	9–1	90%	Won (21–8, 21–6) at 2017 Malaysia Open
(China) Chen Yu	3–3	50%	Won (25–23, 21–11) at 2008 Malaysia Open
(Indonesia) Indra Wijaya	0–1	0%	Lost (12–15, 7–15) at 2001 Asian Badminton Championships
No. 5 ranked players			
(Malaysia) James Chua	1–0	100%	Won (15–5, 15–6) at 2005 Indonesia Open
(Vietnam) **Nguyễn Tiến Minh**	11–1	92%	Won (21–10, 21–5) at 2013 Japan Open
No. 6 ranked players			
(China) Wang Zhengming	17–0	100%	Won (21–16, 9–2^{r}) at 2016 Indonesia Open
(India) **Parupalli Kashyap**	7–0	100%	Won (21–14, 21–15) at 2015 Denmark Open
(Japan) Sho Sasaki	6–0	100%	Won (21–9, 21–12) at 2015 French Open
(Denmark) Joachim Persson	5–0	100%	Won (21–6, 21–4) at 2008 Japan Open
(South Korea) Park Sung-hwan	13–1	93%	Won (21–10, 21–5) at 2011 BWF World Championships
(Hong Kong) **Ng Ka Long Angus**	8–1	89%	Won (21–15, 18–21, 21–10) at 2018 Indonesia Open
(Malaysia) Muhammad Hafiz Hashim	6–2	75%	Won (21–16, 21–16) at 2010 BWF World Championships
(China) Tian Houwei	3–1	75%	Won (21–9, 21–7) at 2017 Hong Kong Open
No. 7 ranked players			
(Indonesia) **Anthony Sinisuka Ginting**	2–0	100%	Won (21–19, 21–16) at 2018 Thomas Cup
(Wales) Richard Vaughan	1–0	100%	Won (15–7, 11–15, 15–4) at 2004 Thailand Open
(Malaysia) Yong Hock Kin	0–1	0%	Lost (5–7, 5–7, 1–7) at 2001 Thailand Open
No. 8 ranked players			
(Denmark) **Hans-Kristian Vittinghus**	4–0	100%	Won (22–20, 21–12) at 2015 U.S. Open
(Malaysia) Lee Tsuen Seng	1–0	100%	Won (21–15, 21–10) at 2007 Hong Kong Open
(India) **Prannoy H. S.**	3–2	60%	Won (21–16, 9–21, 21–14) at 2018 Commonwealth Games
No. 9 ranked players			
(Thailand) **Tanongsak Saensomboonsuk**	9–0	100%	Won (21–8, 21–14) at 2014 Singapore Open
(Hong Kong) Chan Yan Kit	5–0	100%	Won (17–21, 21–9, 21–6) at 2010 Asian Games
(Hong Kong) Ng Wei	5–3	63%	Won (21–9, 21–12) at 2011 Hong Kong Open
(Japan) **Kenta Nishimoto**	2–2	50%	Lost (21–19, 18–21, 19–21) at 2018 Malaysia Masters
No. 10 ranked players			
(Hong Kong) **Wong Wing Ki Vincent**	9–0	100%	Won (21–15, 16–21, 21–17) at 2017 Japan Open
(India) Chetan Anand	7–0	100%	Won (21–15, 21–16) at 2010 All England Open
(England) Rajiv Ouseph	7–0	100%	Won (21–18, 21–16) at 2018 Commonwealth Games
(Poland) Przemysław Wacha	6–0	100%	Won (21–11, 21–8) at 2011 China Open
(Malaysia) **Liew Daren**	3–0	100%	Won (21–16, 21–16) at 2012 Denmark Open
(Chinese Taipei) Hsieh Yu-hsing	2–0	100%	Won (21–11, 21–12) at 2009 BWF Super Series Masters Finals
(Chinese Taipei) **Wang Tzu-wei**	2–0	100%	Won (17–21, 21–13, 21–15) at 2018 Badminton Asia Team Championships
(Germany) Marc Zwiebler	13–1	93%	Won (21–14, 21–15) at 2016 Japan Open
Total	451–124	78%	

=== Record against players ranked No. 11–20 ===
Active players are in boldface.

- (England) Andrew Smith 9–0
- (India) **Ajay Jayaram** 8–0
- (France) **Brice Leverdez** 8–3
- (Netherlands) Dicky Palyama 6–0
- (Indonesia) Dionysius Hayom Rumbaka 6–0
- (Japan) Kazumasa Sakai 5–0
- (Chinese Taipei) **Hsu Jen-hao** 5–1
- (Malaysia) Chong Wei Feng 4–0
- (South Korea) **Lee Dong-keun** 4–0
- (Singapore) Kendrick Lee Yen Hui 4–0
- (India) **B. Sai Praneeth** 4–1
- (India) Arvind Bhat 3–0
- (China) Qiao Bin 3–0
- (Japan) Takuma Ueda 3–0
- (Hong Kong) Wei Nan 3–2
- (Spain) **Pablo Abián** 2–0
- (India) Gurusai Dutt 2–0
- (Japan) Shōji Satō 2–0
- (Indonesia) Andre Kurniawan Tedjono 2–0
- (Indonesia) Alamsyah Yunus 2–0
- (Denmark) **Anders Antonsen** 1–0
- (China) Chen Yuekun 1–0
- (South Korea) **Jeon Hyeok-jin** 1–0
- (Indonesia) **Ihsan Maulana Mustofa** 1–0
- (Thailand) **Khosit Phetpradab** 1–0
- (India) **Sameer Verma** 1–0
- (Thailand) **Kantaphon Wangcharoen** 1–0
- (Japan) Kazushi Yamada 1–0

*As of 11 July 2019

=== Top-10 wins ===
Season	1998	1999	2000	2001	2002	2003	2004	2005	2006	2007	2008	2009	2010	2011	2012	2013	2014	2015	2016	2017	2018	2019	**Total**
Wins	0	0	0	0	0	2	6	7	9	17	10	14	21	21	10	20	17	16	15	11	5	0	**201**

#	Player	Rank	Event	Rd	Score	LCWR
**2003**
1.	(South Korea) Lee Hyun-il	No. 4	Malaysia Open, Malaysia	SF	15–11, 15–1	No. 55
2.	(Denmark) Kenneth Jonassen	No. 2	Denmark Open, Denmark	3R	10–15, 15–11, 15–7	No. 22
**2004**
3.	(Denmark) Kenneth Jonassen	No. 4	Korea Open, South Korea	3R	15–4, 15–3	No. 9
4.	(Denmark) Peter Gade	No. 7	Malaysia Open, Malaysia	3R	12–15, 15–3, 17–16	No. 11
5.	(China) Bao Chunlai	No. 5	Malaysia Open, Malaysia	QF	15–10, 15–11	No. 11
6.	(China) Chen Hong	No. 2	Malaysia Open, Malaysia	SF	21–8, 5–15, 15–6	No. 11
7.	(Denmark) Peter Gade	No. 2	Singapore Open, Singapore	QF	15–5, 15–13	No. 13
8.	(China) Bao Chunlai	No. 5	Singapore Open, Singapore	SF	3–15, 15–9, 17–15	No. 13
**2005**
9.	(Indonesia) Taufik Hidayat	No. 4	Malaysia Open, Malaysia	QF	15–5, 15–0	No. 8
10.	(China) Bao Chunlai	No. 6	Malaysia Open, Malaysia	SF	11–15, 15–12, 15–9	No. 8
11.	(China) Lin Dan	No. 1	Malaysia Open, Malaysia	F	17–15, 9–15, 15–9	No. 8
12.	(China) Bao Chunlai	No. 6	IBF World Championships, United States	QF	15–5, 15–7	No. 5
13.	(Malaysia) Wong Choong Hann	No. 10	Denmark Open, Denmark	SF	17–14, 15–4	No. 3
14.	(Malaysia) Muhammad Hafiz Hashim	No. 8	Denmark Open, Denmark	F	17–14, 15–8	No. 3
15.	(Malaysia) Wong Choong Hann	No. 10	Hong Kong Open, Hong Kong	QF	15–4, 15–1	No. 2
**2006**
16.	(Malaysia) Wong Choong Hann	No. 9	Swiss Open, Switzerland	SF	12–15, 15–2, 15–3	No. 2
17.	(China) Chen Hong	No. 3	All England Open, United Kingdom	QF	9–15, 17–14, 15–2	No. 2
18.	(South Korea) Lee Hyun-il	No. 3	Malaysia Open, Malaysia	SF	15–21, 21–12, 21–6	No. 1
19.	(China) Lin Dan	No. 2	Malaysia Open, Malaysia	F	21–18, 18–21, 23–21	No. 1
20.	(Thailand) Boonsak Ponsana	No. 10	Chinese Taipei Open, Chinese Taipei	QF	21–17, 21–8	No. 1
21.	(China) Bao Chunlai	No. 5	Macau Open, Macau	QF	21–14, 21–10	No. 1
22.	(China) Chen Hong	No. 7	Macau Open, Macau	SF		No. 1
23.	(South Korea) Lee Hyun-il	No. 3	Hong Kong Open, Hong Kong	QF	21–13, 21–15	No. 1
24.	(China) Chen Jin	No. 5	Hong Kong Open, Hong Kong	SF	11–21, 21–19, 24–22	No. 1
**2007**
25.	(China) Chen Hong	No. 3	Indonesia Open, Indonesia	SF	23–21, 21–10	No. 8
26.	(China) Bao Chunlai	No. 2	Indonesia Open, Indonesia	F	21–15, 21–16	No. 8
27.	(Thailand) Boonsak Ponsana	No. 10	Sudirman Cup, Scotland	RR	21–15, 21–16	No. 4
28.	(China) Lin Dan	No. 1	Sudirman Cup, Scotland	RR	21–17, 21–17	No. 4
29.	(Indonesia) Taufik Hidayat	No. 7	China Masters, China	QF	22–20, 20–22, 21–17	No. 4
30.	(China) Chen Hong	No. 2	Philippines Open, Philippines	F	21–9, 21–15	No. 4
31.	(China) Chen Jin	No. 8	Japan Open, Japan	QF	21–7, 21–16	No. 4
32.	(China) Lin Dan	No. 1	Japan Open, Japan	SF	21–19, 21–15	No. 4
33.	(Indonesia) Taufik Hidayat	No. 7	Japan Open, Japan	F	22–20, 19–21, 21–19	No. 4
34.	(Indonesia) Sony Dwi Kuncoro	No. 9	Denmark Open, Denmark	QF	21–18, 21–10	No. 4
35.	(Denmark) Kenneth Jonassen	No. 9	French Open, France	1R	21–14, 21–11	No. 2
36.	(China) Chen Jin	No. 7	French Open, France	SF	21–8, 21–8	No. 2
37.	(China) Bao Chunlai	No. 3	French Open, France	F	21–11, 21–14	No. 2
38.	(Indonesia) Sony Dwi Kuncoro	No. 7	China Open, China	QF	21–10, 19–21, 21–14	No. 2
39.	(China) Chen Jin	No. 5	China Open, China	SF	20–22, 21–15, 21–17	No. 2
40.	(Denmark) Peter Gade	No. 6	Hong Kong Open, Hong Kong	QF	21–17, 22–20	No. 3
41.	(Denmark) Kenneth Jonassen	No. 9	Hong Kong Open, Hong Kong	SF	21–13, 21–17	No. 3
**2008**
42.	(China) Chen Yu	No. 10	Malaysia Open, Malaysia	SF	25–23, 21–11	No. 3
43.	(Indonesia) Taufik Hidayat	No. 5	All England Open, United Kingdom	QF	23–21, 21–17	No. 1
44.	(Denmark) Kenneth Jonassen	No. 7	Swiss Open, Switzerland	QF	21–13, 21–15	No. 2
45.	(China) Lin Dan	No. 2	Thomas Cup, Indonesia	SF	21–12, 21–14	No. 1
46.	(Denmark) Peter Gade	No. 10	Singapore Open, Singapore	SF	21–18, 21–13	No. 2
47.	(Indonesia) Sony Dwi Kuncoro	No. 5	Summer Olympic Games, China	QF	21–9, 21–11	No. 1
48.	(South Korea) Lee Hyun-il	No. 8	Summer Olympic Games, China	SF	21–18, 13–21, 21–13	No. 1
49.	(Denmark) Peter Gade	No. 5	BWF Super Series Finals, Malaysia	RR	21–19, 21–17	No. 1
50.	(Indonesia) Taufik Hidayat	No. 8	BWF Super Series Finals, Malaysia	SF	21–5, 21–10	No. 1
51.	(Denmark) Peter Gade	No. 5	BWF Super Series Finals, Malaysia	F	21–8, 21–16	No. 1
**2009**
52.	(Denmark) Peter Gade	No. 5	Malaysia Open, Malaysia	SF	24–26, 21–17, 21–13	No. 1
53.	(Indonesia) Taufik Hidayat	No. 6	All England Open, United Kingdom	SF	21–8, 21–13	No. 1
54.	(Indonesia) Taufik Hidayat	No. 6	Swiss Open, Switzerland	QF	21–23, 21–12, 21–19	No. 1
55.	(China) Lin Dan	No. 2	Swiss Open, Switzerland	F	21–16, 21–16	No. 1
56.	(South Korea) Park Sung-hwan	No. 9	Indonesia Open, Indonesia	F	21–16, 21–16	No. 1
57.	(China) Chen Jin	No. 5	Indonesia Open, Indonesia	SF	21–15, 22–20	No. 1
58.	(Indonesia) Taufik Hidayat	No. 6	Indonesia Open, Indonesia	F	21–9, 21–14	No. 1
59.	(Indonesia) Taufik Hidayat	No. 4	Macau Open, Macau	SF	21–18, 22–20	No. 1
60.	(Thailand) Boonsak Ponsana	No. 9	Japan Open, Japan	1R	21–9, 21–15	No. 1
61.	(Denmark) Peter Gade	No. 5	Hong Kong Open, Hong Kong	F	21–13, 13–21, 21–16	No. 1
62.	(Indonesia) Taufik Hidayat	No. 3	BWF Super Series Finals, Malaysia	RR	21–6, 21–13	No. 1
63.	(China) Bao Chunlai	No. 8	BWF Super Series Finals, Malaysia	RR	21–13, 21–11	No. 1
64.	(Denmark) Peter Gade	No. 4	BWF Super Series Finals, Malaysia	SF	21–17, 21–16	No. 1
65.	(South Korea) Park Sung Hwan	No. 9	BWF Super Series Finals, Malaysia	F	21–17, 21–17	No. 1
**2010**
66.	(China) Chen Jin	No. 5	Korea Open, South Korea	SF	21–11, 21–13	No. 1
67.	(Denmark) Peter Gade	No. 4	Korea Open, South Korea	F	21–12, 21–11	No. 1
68.	(China) Chen Jin	No. 3	Malaysia Open, Malaysia	QF	21–14, 16–21, 21–15	No. 1
69.	(Vietnam) Nguyễn Tiến Minh	No. 7	Malaysia Open, Malaysia	SF	22–20, 21–11	No. 1
70.	(Denmark) Peter Gade	No. 5	All England Open, United Kingdom	SF	21–17, 21–14	No. 1
71.	(Denmark) Peter Gade	No. 4	Thomas Cup, Malaysia	QF	21–17, 21–17	No. 1
72.	(Indonesia) Sony Dwi Kuncoro	No. 8	Indonesia Open, Indonesia	SF	21–13, 21–9	No. 1
73.	(Indonesia) Taufik Hidayat	No. 5	Indonesia Open, Indonesia	F	21–19, 21–8	No. 1
74.	(Indonesia) Simon Santoso	No. 8	Macau Open, Macau	SF	21–12, 18–21, 21–12	No. 1
75.	(China) Bao Chunlai	No. 6	Japan Open, Japan	QF	21–10, 21–10	No. 1
76.	(China) Lin Dan	No. 5	Japan Open, Japan	F	22–20, 16–21, 21–17	No. 1
77.	(Thailand) Boonsak Ponsana	No. 6	Asian Games, China	QF	21–13, 21–17	No. 1
78.	(China) Chen Jin	No. 5	Asian Games, China	SF	14–21, 21–15, 21–7	No. 1
79.	(China) Chen Jin	No. 5	Hong Kong Open, Hong Kong	QF	Walkover	No. 1
80.	(Vietnam) Nguyễn Tiến Minh	No. 9	Hong Kong Open, Hong Kong	SF	21–14, 21–17	No. 1
81.	(Indonesia) Taufik Hidayat	No. 3	Hong Kong Open, Hong Kong	F	21–19, 21–9	No. 1
82.	(Denmark) Jan Ø. Jørgensen	No. 10	BWF Super Series Finals, Chinese Taipei	RR	21–18, 21–13	No. 1
83.	(Denmark) Peter Gade	No. 3	BWF Super Series Finals, Chinese Taipei	RR	21–14, 21–12	No. 1
84.	(Vietnam) Nguyễn Tiến Minh	No. 9	BWF Super Series Finals, Chinese Taipei	RR	21–12, 21–17	No. 1
85.	(Thailand) Boonsak Ponsana	No. 7	BWF Super Series Finals, Chinese Taipei	SF	21–17, 21–18	No. 1
86.	(Denmark) Peter Gade	No. 3	BWF Super Series Finals, Chinese Taipei	F	21–9, 21–14	No. 1
**2011**
87.	(Vietnam) Nguyễn Tiến Minh	No. 7	Malaysia Open, Malaysia	QF	21–15, 21–16	No. 1
88.	(China) Chen Long	No. 4	Malaysia Open, Malaysia	SF	21–9, 21–9	No. 1
89.	(Indonesia) Taufik Hidayat	No. 2	Malaysia Open, Malaysia	F	21–8, 21–17	No. 1
90.	(Denmark) Jan Ø. Jørgensen	No. 9	Korea Open, South Korea	1R	21–9, 18–21, 21–16	No. 1
91.	(China) Du Pengyu	No. 9	Korea Open, South Korea	SF	21–10, 21–10	No. 1
92.	(Thailand) Boonsak Ponsana	No. 7	All England Open, United Kingdom	QF	21–15, 21–7	No. 1
93.	(China) Chen Long	No. 5	All England Open, United Kingdom	SF	21–17, 21–13	No. 1
94.	(China) Lin Dan	No. 3	All England Open, United Kingdom	F	21–17, 21–17	No. 1
95.	(Denmark) Peter Gade	No. 6	India Open, India	F	21–12, 12–21, 21–15	No. 1
96.	(South Korea) Park Sung Hwan	No. 9	Sudirman Cup, China	QF	21–18, 21–14	No. 1
97.	(Vietnam) Nguyễn Tiến Minh	No. 7	Indonesia Open, Indonesia	QF	21–10, 21–14	No. 1
98.	(China) Chen Long	No. 4	Indonesia Open, Indonesia	SF	21–17, 21–18	No. 1
99.	(Denmark) Peter Gade	No. 5	Indonesia Open, Indonesia	F	21–11, 21–7	No. 1
100.	(South Korea) Park Sung Hwan	No. 9	BWF World Championships, United Kingdom	3R	21–10, 21–5	No. 1
101.	(China) Chen Jin	No. 6	BWF World Championships, United Kingdom	SF	21–13, 21–9	No. 1
102.	(Denmark) Peter Gade	No. 3	Japan Open, Japan	SF	21–13, 21–16	No. 1
103.	(China) Chen Jin	No. 6	Denmark Open, Denmark	QF	21–14, 21–19	No. 1
104.	(Denmark) Peter Gade	No. 4	Denmark Open, Denmark	SF	21–19, 23–21	No. 1
105.	(China) Chen Long	No. 2	French Open, France	SF	23–21, 17–21, 21–15	No. 1
106.	(Indonesia) Simon Santoso	No. 8	BWF Super Series Finals, China	RR	21–10, 21–15	No. 1
107.	(Denmark) Peter Gade	No. 4	BWF Super Series Finals, China	RR	24–22, 21–14	No. 1
**2012**
108.	(China) Lin Dan	No. 2	Korea Open, South Korea	F	12–21, 21–18, 21–14	No. 1
109.	(China) Chen Long	No. 3	Malaysia Open, Malaysia	SF	21–18, 17–21, 21–13	No. 1
110.	(South Korea) Lee Hyun-il	No. 8	Thomas Cup, China	RR	21–13, 21–15	No. 1
111.	(South Korea) Lee Hyun-il	No. 7	All England Open, United Kingdom	SF	21–19, 21–18	No. 1
112.	(Indonesia) Simon Santoso	No. 7	Summer Olympic Games, United Kingdom	QF	21–12, 21–8	No. 2
113.	(China) Chen Long	No. 3	Summer Olympic Games, United Kingdom	SF	21–13, 21–14	No. 2
114.	(Indonesia) Simon Santoso	No. 5	Japan Open, Japan	SF	21–7, 21–17	No. 2
115.	(China) Du Pengyu	No. 9	Denmark Open, Denmark	F	15–21, 21–12, 21–19	No. 1
116.	(Vietnam) Nguyễn Tiến Minh	No. 10	Hong Kong Open, Hong Kong	QF	21–18, 21–19	No. 1
117.	(Japan) Kenichi Tago	No. 9	Hong Kong Open, Hong Kong	SF	21–19, 21–15	No. 1
**2013**
118.	(Hong Kong) Hu Yun	No. 9	Korea Open, South Korea	QF	21–15, 21–17	No. 1
119.	(China) Du Pengyu	No. 5	Korea Open, South Korea	F	21–15, 21–17	No. 1
120.	(Hong Kong) Hu Yun	No. 6	Malaysia Open, Malaysia	QF	21–12, 21–9	No. 1
121.	(Indonesia) Sony Dwi Kuncoro	No. 5	Malaysia Open, Malaysia	F	21–7, 21–8	No. 1
122.	(Vietnam) Nguyễn Tiến Minh	No. 8	All England Open, United Kingdom	QF	21–17, 21–19	No. 1
123.	(Japan) Kenichi Tago	No. 9	India Open, India	F	21–15, 18–21, 21–17	No. 1
124.	(Thailand) Boonsak Ponsana	No. 5	Indonesia Open, Indonesia	QF	21–10, 21–7	No. 1
125.	(Indonesia) Tommy Sugiarto	No. 8	BWF World Championships, China	QF	21–6, 21–9	No. 1
126.	(China) Du Pengyu	No. 3	BWF World Championships, China	SF	20–22, 21–12, 21–15	No. 1
127.	(Vietnam) Nguyễn Tiến Minh	No. 8	Japan Open, Japan	SF	21–10, 21–5	No. 1
128.	(Japan) Kenichi Tago	No. 5	Japan Open, Japan	F	23–21, 21–17	No. 1
129.	(Denmark) Jan Ø. Jørgensen	No. 5	Denmark Open, Denmark	QF	8–21, 21–18, 21–5	No. 1
130.	(China) Du Pengyu	No. 3	Denmark Open, Denmark	SF	20–22, 21–6, 21–15	No. 1
131.	(Thailand) Boonsak Ponsana	No. 8	French Open, France	QF	21–13, 21–17	No. 1
132.	(Denmark) Jan Ø. Jørgensen	No. 6	Hong Kong Open, Hong Kong	QF	21–8, 21–17	No. 1
133.	(Thailand) Boonsak Ponsana	No. 7	Hong Kong Open, Hong Kong	SF	21–12, 21–7	No. 1
134.	(Thailand) Boonsak Ponsana	No. 7	BWF Super Series Finals, Malaysia	RR	21–6, 21–8	No. 1
135.	(Denmark) Jan Ø. Jørgensen	No. 4	BWF Super Series Finals, Malaysia	RR	23–21, 24–22	No. 1
136.	(Denmark) Jan Ø. Jørgensen	No. 4	BWF Super Series Finals, Malaysia	SF	21–14, 21–16	No. 1
137.	(Indonesia) Tommy Sugiarto	No. 5	BWF Super Series Finals, Malaysia	F	21–10, 21–12	No. 1
**2014**
138.	(China) Du Pengyu	No. 7	Korea Open, South Korea	QF	21–12, 21–15	No. 1
139.	(Japan) Kenichi Tago	No. 8	Korea Open, South Korea	SF	21–17, 21–17	No. 1
140.	(China) Wang Zhengming	No. 8	Malaysia Open, Malaysia	2R	21–17, 21–18	No. 1
141.	(China) Du Pengyu	No. 9	Malaysia Open, Malaysia	QF	21–9, 21–15	No. 1
142.	(Denmark) Jan Ø. Jørgensen	No. 3	Malaysia Open, Malaysia	SF	21–13, 3–0^{r}	No. 1
143.	(Indonesia) Tommy Sugiarto	No. 4	Malaysia Open, Malaysia	F	21–19, 21–9	No. 1
144.	(China) Chen Long	No. 2	All England Open, United Kingdom	F	21–13, 21–18	No. 1
145.	(China) Du Pengyu	No. 9	India Open, India	SF	21–17, 19–21, 21–14	No. 1
146.	(China) Chen Long	No. 2	India Open, India	F	21–13, 21–17	No. 1
147.	(South Korea) Son Wan-ho	No. 9	Thomas Cup, India	RR	21–17, 21–17	No. 1
148.	(Denmark) Jan Ø. Jørgensen	No. 3	Thomas Cup, India	QF	20–22, 21–14, 21–17	No. 1
149.	(Indonesia) Tommy Sugiarto	No. 5	Thomas Cup, India	SF	21–19, 21–13	No. 1
150.	(Japan) Kenichi Tago	No. 4	Thomas Cup, India	F	21–12, 21–16	No. 1
151.	(Indonesia) Tommy Sugiarto	No. 5	Japan Open, Japan	QF	21–15, 12–21, 21–17	No. 1
152.	(Japan) Kenichi Tago	No. 4	Japan Open, Japan	SF	21–15, 21–17	No. 1
153.	(Denmark) Hans-Kristian Vittinghus	No. 10	Indonesia Open, Indonesia	QF	21–18, 21–11	No. 1
154.	(China) Wang Zhengming	No. 6	BWF World Championships, Denmark	QF	21–8, 21–11	No. 1
**2015**
155.	(India) Srikanth Kidambi	No. 4	Sudirman Cup, China	RR	21–16, 21–15	No. 46
156.	(South Korea) Son Wan-ho	No. 5	Sudirman Cup, China	QF	21–17, 21–12	No. 46
157.	(Denmark) Hans-Kristian Vittinghus	No. 10	U.S. Open, USA	F	22–20, 21–12	No. 100
158.	(China) Wang Zhengming	No. 7	Chinese Taipei Open, Chinese Taipei	F	21–10, 21–15	No. 65
159.	(China) Wang Zhengming	No. 8	BWF World Championships, Indonesia	3R	21–17, 21–19	No. 44
160.	(Denmark) Jan Ø. Jørgensen	No. 2	BWF World Championships, Indonesia	SF	21–7, 21–19	No. 44
161.	(India) Parupalli Kashyap	No. 8	Denmark Open, Denmark	1R	21–14, 21–15	No. 25
162.	(Denmark) Viktor Axelsen	No. 7	French Open, France	2R	12–21, 21–17, 21–14	No. 19
163.	(China) Wang Zhengming	No. 9	French Open, France	SF	21–7, 21–13	No. 19
164.	(Chinese Taipei) Chou Tien-chen	No. 5	French Open, France	F	21–13, 21–18	No. 19
165.	(Chinese Taipei) Chou Tien-chen	No. 7	China Open, China	2R	21–9, 15–21, 21–12	No. 9
166.	(Denmark) Jan Ø. Jørgensen	No. 2	China Open, China	QF	21–11, 11–21, 21–10	No. 9
167.	(China) Lin Dan	No. 3	China Open, China	SF	17–21, 21–19, 21–19	No. 9
168.	(China) Chen Long	No. 1	China Open, China	F	21–15, 21–11	No. 9
169.	(China) Chen Long	No. 1	Hong Kong Open, Hong Kong	QF	13–21, 21–19, 21–15	No. 6
170.	(China) Tian Houwei	No. 10	Hong Kong Open, Hong Kong	F	21–16, 21–15	No. 6
**2016**
171.	(Denmark) Viktor Axelsen	No. 6	Malaysia Open, Malaysia	QF	21–14, 21–13	No. 4
172.	(Denmark) Jan Ø. Jørgensen	No. 5	Malaysia Open, Malaysia	SF	21–7, 21–14	No. 4
173.	(China) Chen Long	No. 1	Malaysia Open, Malaysia	F	21–13, 21–8	No. 4
174.	(Chinese Taipei) Chou Tien-chen	No. 7	Asia Championships, China	QF	21–16, 21–18	No. 2
175.	(China) Lin Dan	No. 3	Asia Championships, China	SF	22–20, 15–21, 21–4	No. 2
176.	(China) Chen Long	No. 1	Asia Championships, China	F	21–17, 15–21, 21–13	No. 2
177.	(South Korea) Son Wan-ho	No. 9	Thomas Cup, China	RR	21–18, 21–15	No. 2
178.	(Chinese Taipei) Chou Tien-chen	No. 7	Thomas Cup, China	QF	21–18, 21–18	No. 2
179.	(Denmark) Viktor Axelsen	No. 4	Thomas Cup, China	SF	23–21, 21–18	No. 2
180.	(Denmark) Jan Ø. Jørgensen	No. 5	Indonesia Open, Indonesia	F	17–21, 21–19, 21–17	No. 2
181.	(Chinese Taipei) Chou Tien-chen	No. 7	Summer Olympic Games, Brazil	QF	21–9, 21–15	No. 1
182.	(China) Lin Dan	No. 3	Summer Olympic Games, Brazil	SF	15–21, 21–11, 22–20	No. 1
183.	(China) Shi Yuqi	No. 4	Japan Open, Japan	QF	21–12, 21–12	No. 1
184.	(Denmark) Jan Ø. Jørgensen	No. 5	Japan Open, Japan	F	21–18, 15–21, 21–16	No. 1
185.	(Hong Kong) Ng Ka Long Angus	No. 9	BWF Super Series Finals, UAE	RR	21–15, 22–20	No. 1
**2017**
186.	(China) Tian Houwei	No. 6	All England Open, United Kingdom	QF	21–12, 21–15	No. 1
187.	(Chinese Taipei) Chou Tien-chen	No. 9	All England Open, United Kingdom	SF	10–21, 21–14, 21–9	No. 1
188.	(China) Shi Yuqi	No. 10	All England Open, United Kingdom	F	21–12, 21–10	No. 1
189.	(Chinese Taipei) Chou Tien-chen	No. 5	Japan Open, Japan	QF	21–11, 15–21, 21–19	No. 7
190.	(China) Shi Yuqi	No. 4	Japan Open, Japan	SF	21–19, 21–8	No. 7
191.	(South Korea) Son Wan-ho	No. 2	Hong Kong Open, Hong Kong	QF	21–11, 21–12	No. 6
192.	(China) Shi Yuqi	No. 8	Hong Kong Open, Hong Kong	SF	21–19, 21–8	No. 6
193.	(China) Chen Long	No. 4	Hong Kong Open, Hong Kong	F	21–14, 21–19	No. 6
194.	(Hong Kong) Ng Ka Long Angus	No. 9	BWF Super Series Finals, UAE	RR	21–14, 21–13	No. 2
195.	(China) Chen Long	No. 3	BWF Super Series Finals, UAE	RR	Walkover	No. 2
196.	(South Korea) Son Wan-ho	No. 5	BWF Super Series Finals, UAE	SF	21–17, 21–11	No. 2
**2018**
197.	(India) Srikanth Kidambi	No. 1	Commonwealth Games, Australia	F	19–21, 21–14, 21–14	No. 7
198.	(India) Srikanth Kidambi	No. 5	Asia Championships, China	QF	21–12, 21–15	No. 7
199.	(Denmark) Viktor Axelsen	No. 1	Thomas Cup, Thailand	RR	21–9, 21–19	No. 7
200.	(Denmark) Viktor Axelsen	No. 1	Malaysia Open, Malaysia	QF	21–17, 21–9	No. 7
201.	(Hong Kong) Ng Ka Long Angus	No. 10	Indonesia Open, Indonesia	1R	21–15, 18–21, 21–10	No. 4

=== Negative records against other players ===
Active players are in boldface.

**Player**	**Record**	**W%**	**Last Match**
(China) Xia Xuanze	1–2	33%	Won (15–8, 15–0) at 2006 Swiss Open
(China) Lin Dan	12–28	30%	Lost (16–21, 17–21) at 2018 All England Open
(South Korea) Park Tae-sang	0–1	0%	Lost (3–15, 13–15) at 2004 Korea Open
(Indonesia) Marleve Mainaky	0–1	0%	Lost (15–8, 13–15, 10–15) at 2002 Indonesia Open
(Thailand) Jakrapan Thanathiratham	0–1	0%	Lost (15–8, 4–15, 2–15) at 2002 India Asia Satellite
(Malaysia) Yong Hock Kin	0–1	0%	Lost (5–7, 5–7, 1–7) at 2001 Thailand Open
(Indonesia) Indra Wijaya	0–1	0%	Lost (12–15, 7–15) at 2001 Asia Championships
(Denmark) Anders Boesen	0–1	0%	Lost (3–7, 7–2, 5–7) at 2001 Singapore Open
(Indonesia) Edi Bina Santoso	0–1	0%	Lost (15–13, 10–15, 5–15) at 2001 Indonesia International
(Wales) Irwansyah	0–1	0%	Lost (7–15, 6–15) at 1998 Malaysia Open
(Malaysia) Ong Ewe Hock	0–2	0%	Lost (7–8, 5–7, 2–7) at 2001 Malaysia Open
(Malaysia) Alvin Chew Ming Yao	0–2	0%	Lost (7–3, 7–1, 3–7) at 2001 Malaysia International

== BWF Tour career earnings ==
Year	BWF wins	Earnings
1998	0	$
1999	0	$
2000	0	$
2001	0	$1,250.00
2002	0	$597.50
2003	1	$595.00
2004	2	$
2005	2	$3,625.00
2006	2	$22,272.50
2007	4	$85,575.00
2008	3	$106,110.00
2009	7	$149,525.00
2010	9	$164,200.00
2011	6	$181,750.00
2012	5	$193,200.00
2013	7	$287,050.00
2014	4	$150,075.00
2015	5	$116,082.50
2016	4	$156,500.00
2017	2	$160,475.00
2018	1	$77,075.00
2019	0	$0.00
Career*	64	$1,855,957.50

* Statistics correct as of 13 June 2019.

== Longest winning streak ==
=== 29 match winning streak 2011 ===
No.	Tournament	Start date (tournament)	Tier	Opponent	Rank	Rd	Score
–	Korea Open, South Korea	24 January 2011	Super Series Premier	(China) Lin Dan	3	F	19–21, 21–14, 16–21
1	All England Open, United Kingdom	7 March 2011	Super Series Premier	(France) Brice Leverdez	32	1R	21–9, 21–11
2	All England Open, United Kingdom	7 March 2011	Super Series Premier	(China) Bao Chunlai	13	2R	21–16, 21–16
3	All England Open, United Kingdom	7 March 2011	Super Series Premier	(Thailand) Boonsak Ponsana	7	QF	21–15, 21–7
4	All England Open, United Kingdom	7 March 2011	Super Series Premier	(China) Chen Long	5	SF	21–17, 21–13
5	All England Open, United Kingdom	7 March 2011	Super Series Premier	(China) Lin Dan	3	F	21–17, 21–17
6	India Open, India	25 April 2011	Super Series	(India) Ajay Jayaram	29	1R	21–19, 21–18
7	India Open, India	25 April 2011	Super Series	(South Korea) Lee Hyun-il	18	2R	21–13, 21–17
8	India Open, India	25 April 2011	Super Series	(India) Sourabh Verma	218	QF	21–7, 21–8
9	India Open, India	25 April 2011	Super Series	(Hong Kong) Hu Yun	20	SF	21–11, 21–15
10	India Open, India	25 April 2011	Super Series	(Denmark) Peter Gade	4	F	21–12, 12–21, 21–15
11	Malaysia Masters, Malaysia	2 May 2011	Grand Prix Gold	(Singapore) Robin Gonansa	106	1R	21–7, 21–16
12	Malaysia Masters, Malaysia	2 May 2011	Grand Prix Gold	(Japan) Takuma Ueda	55	2R	21–8, 21–12
13	Malaysia Masters, Malaysia	2 May 2011	Grand Prix Gold	(Indonesia) Tommy Sugiarto	24	3R	21–19, 21–19
14	Malaysia Masters, Malaysia	2 May 2011	Grand Prix Gold	(France) Brice Leverdez	34	QF	21–17, 21–8
15	Malaysia Masters, Malaysia	2 May 2011	Grand Prix Gold	(Japan) Sho Sasaki	17	SF	21–13, 21–14
16	Malaysia Masters, Malaysia	2 May 2011	Grand Prix Gold	(China) Bao Chunlai	11	F	21–9, 21–19
17	Sudirman Cup, China	23 May 2011	Team Event	(Russia) Ivan Sozonov	68	RR	21–9, 21–10
18	Sudirman Cup, China	23 May 2011	Team Event	(Indonesia) Dionysius Hayom Rumbaka	21	RR	21–8, 21–8
19	Sudirman Cup, China	23 May 2011	Team Event	(South Korea) Park Sung Hwan	9	QF	21–18, 21–14
20	Indonesia Open, Indonesia	20 June 2011	Super Series Premier	(Indonesia) Tommy Sugiarto	25	1R	21–16, 21–8
21	Indonesia Open, Indonesia	20 June 2011	Super Series Premier	(Hong Kong) Wong Wing Ki Vincent	27	2R	21–17, 21–12
22	Indonesia Open, Indonesia	20 June 2011	Super Series Premier	(Vietnam) Nguyễn Tiến Minh	7	QF	21–10, 21–14
23	Indonesia Open, Indonesia	20 June 2011	Super Series Premier	(China) Chen Long	4	SF	21–17, 21–18
24	Indonesia Open, Indonesia	20 June 2011	Super Series Premier	(Denmark) Peter Gade	5	F	21–11, 21–7
25	World Championships, United Kingdom	8 August 2011	Continental Championships	(Thailand) Tanongsak Saensomboonsuk	31	1R	21–15, 21–17
26	World Championships, United Kingdom	8 August 2011	Continental Championships	(Finland) Ville Lang	45	2R	21–10, 21–11
27	World Championships, United Kingdom	8 August 2011	Continental Championships	(South Korea) Park Sung Hwan	9	3R	21–10, 21–5
28	World Championships, United Kingdom	8 August 2011	Continental Championships	(Guatemala) Kevin Cordon	34	QF	21–7, 21–13
29	World Championships, United Kingdom	8 August 2011	Continental Championships	(China) Chen Jin	6	SF	21–13, 21–9
–	World Championships, United Kingdom	8 August 2011	Continental Championships	(China) Lin Dan	2	F	22–20, 14–21, 21–23

== Wins over top ranked opposition ==
This list shows Lee's wins over the top ranked player in the world, or if he was world No. 1 himself, then the highest ranked player other than himself which is the world No. 2.

#	Player	Rank	Lee Rank	Event	Rd	Score	Result
1.	(China) Lin Dan	1	8	2005 Malaysia Open, Malaysia	F	17–15, 9–15, 15–9	Winner
2.	(China) Lin Dan	2	1	2006 Malaysia Open, Malaysia	F	21–18, 18–21, 23–21	Winner
3.	(China) Lin Dan	1	4	2007 Sudirman Cup, Scotland	RR	21–17, 21–17	5th/6th Play-offs
4.	(China) Lin Dan	1	4	2007 Japan Open, Japan	SF	21–19, 21–15	Winner
5.	(China) Lin Dan	2	1	2008 Thomas Cup, Indonesia	SF	21–12, 21–14	Semifinals
6.	(China) Lin Dan	2	1	2009 Swiss Open, Switzerland	F	21–16, 21–16	Winner
7.	(Indonesia) Taufik Hidayat	2	1	2011 Malaysia Open, Malaysia	F	21–8, 21–17	Winner
8.	(China) Chen Long	2	1	2011 French Open, France	SF	23–21, 17–21, 21–15	Winner
9.	(China) Lin Dan	2	1	2012 Korea Open, South Korea	F	12–21, 21–18, 21–14	Winner
10.	(China) Chen Long	2	1	2014 All England Open, United Kingdom	F	21–13, 21–18	Winner
11.	(China) Chen Long	2	1	2014 India Open, India	F	21–13, 21–17	Winner
12.	(China) Chen Long	1	9	2015 China Open, China	F	21–15, 21–11	Winner
13.	(China) Chen Long	1	6	2015 Hong Kong Open, Hong Kong	QF	13–21, 21–19, 21–15	Winner
14.	(China) Chen Long	1	2	2016 Asia Championships, China	F	21–17, 15–21, 21–13	Winner
15.	(China) Chen Long	1	4	2016 Malaysia Open, Malaysia	F	21–13, 21–8	Winner
16.	(India) Srikanth Kidambi	1	7	2018 Commonwealth Games, Australia	F	19–21, 21–14, 21–14	Winner
17.	(Denmark) Viktor Axelsen	1	7	2018 Thomas Cup, Thailand	RR	21–9, 21–19	Quarterfinals
18.	(Denmark) Viktor Axelsen	1	6	2018 Malaysia Open, Malaysia	QF	21–17, 21–9	Winner

== Career Super Series Premier tournament seedings ==
The tournaments won by Lee are in boldface. Lee has been seeded first in 19 Super Series Premier tournaments, with 7 of those being consecutively (15 when excluding tournaments Lee did not contest). Also, he was seeded first or second in 22 consecutive Super Series Premiers he played in and was among the top 2 seeds for all the years that the Super Series Premier has been in existence after winning his first Super Series Premier (the 2011 All England Super Series Premier), through the 2017 Indonesia Super Series Premier. He has both won and been runner-up at tournaments when seeded 1st and 2nd.

Legend (Premiers Won / Times Seeded) seeded No. 1 (**9** / 19) seeded No. 2 (**2** / 3) seeded No. 4–8 (0 / 2) not seeded/WC (**1** / 2)	Longest / total / Played: 7 / 24 / 26; 3 / 24 / 26; 2 / 24 / 26; 2 / 24 / 26

Year	Korea Open	Malaysia Open	All England Open Badminton Championships	Indonesia Open	Denmark Open	China Open
2011	1st	Not Super Series Premier tier	**1st**	**1st**	1st	1st
2012	**1st**	Not Super Series Premier tier	1st	did not play	**1st**	did not play
2013	**1st**	Not Super Series Premier tier	1st	**1st**	1st	did not play
2014	Not Super Series Premier tier	**1st**	**1st**	1st	did not play	did not play
2015	Not Super Series Premier tier	did not play	did not play	did not play	not seeded	**not seeded**
2016	Not Super Series Premier tier	**2nd**	2nd	**2nd**	1st	did not play
2017	Not Super Series Premier tier	1st	**1st**	1st	7th	7th

== Career milestone wins ==
=== Centennial match wins ===
#	Date	Age	Player	Event	Rd	Score
1.	March 1999	16 years, 4 months	(Malaysia) Leow Chun Seong	Malaysia International, Malaysia	1R	15–4, 15–0
100.	June 2005	22 years, 8 months	(China) Chen Jin	Singapore Open, Singapore	1R	15–7, 15–10
200.	July 2007	24 years, 9 months	(Chinese Taipei) Liao Sheng-shiun	**Philippines Open**, Philippines	2R	21–12, 21–15
300.	June 2009	26 years, 8 months	(Indonesia) Taufik Hidayat	**Indonesia Open**, Indonesia	F	21–9, 21–14
400.	January 2011	27 years, 3 months	(Denmark) Jan Ø. Jørgensen	Korea Open, South Korea	1R	21–9, 18–21, 21–16
500.	January 2013	29 years, 3 months	(Hong Kong) Hu Yun	**Korea Open**, South Korea	QF	21–15, 21–17
600.	May 2015	31 years, 6 months	(South Korea) Lee Dong-keun	Sudirman Cup, China	RR	21–12, 21–10
700.	September 2017	33 years, 11 months	(Indonesia) Tommy Sugiarto	Japan Open, Japan	2R	22–20, 21–17

- Bold indicates that he went on to win the tournament.

== National representation ==
=== Team competitions finals: 12 (6 titles, 6 runners-up) ===
Finals by tournaments Olympic Games (0–3) Thomas Cup (0–1) Asian Games (0–1) Commonwealth Games (5–1) SEA Games (1–0)	Finals by tournament event Team (3–2) Individual (3–4)

Result	Date	Tournament	Team	Partner(s) (if)	Opponent team	Opponent player(s)	Score
Win	Dec 2005	SEA Games, Pasig, Philippines	Malaysia	Chan Chong Ming; Choong Tan Fook; Muhammad Hafiz Hashim; Koo Kien Keat; Kuan Beng Hong; Lee Wan Wah; Wong Choong Hann	Indonesia	Alvent Yulianto Chandra; Luluk Hadiyanto; Taufik Hidayat; Markis Kido; Sony Dwi Kuncoro; Simon Santoso; Hendra Setiawan; Anggun Nugroho; Nova Widianto	3–2
Win	Mar 2006	Commonwealth Games, Melbourne, Australia	Malaysia	Chan Chong Ming; Chin Eei Hui; Choong Tan Fook; Koo Kien Keat; Ooi Sock Ai; Wong Choong Hann; Wong Mew Choo; Wong Pei Tty; Julia Wong Pei Xian	England	Simon Archer; Robert Blair; Anthony Clark; Gail Emms; Aamir Ghaffar; Tracey Hallam; Donna Kellogg; Joanne Nicholas; Nathan Robertson; Ella Tripp	3–1
Win	Mar 2006	Commonwealth Games, Melbourne, Australia	Malaysia	–	Malaysia	Wong Choong Hann	2–0
Loss	Aug 2008	Summer Olympic Games, Beijing, China	Malaysia	–	China	Lin Dan	0–2
Win	Oct 2010	Commonwealth Games, New Delhi, India	Malaysia	Chan Peng Soon; Lydia Cheah Li Ya; Chin Eei Hui; Goh Liu Ying; Muhammad Hafiz Hashim; Koo Kien Keat; Tan Boon Heong; Wong Mew Choo; Woon Khe Wei	India	Sanave Thomas; Aparna Balan; Chetan Anand; Jwala Gutta; Rupesh Kumar K. T. Ashwini Ponnappa; Aditi Mutatkar; Saina Nehwal; Kashyap Parupalli; Valiyaveetil Diju	3–1
Win	Oct 2010	Commonwealth Games, New Delhi, India	Malaysia	–	England	Rajiv Ouseph	2–0
Loss	Nov 2010	Asian Games, Guangzhou, China	Malaysia	–	China	Lin Dan	1–2
Loss	Aug 2012	Summer Olympic Games, London, United Kingdom	Malaysia	–	China	Lin Dan	1–2
Loss	May 2014	Thomas Cup, New Delhi, India	Malaysia	Chan Peng Soon; Chong Wei Feng; Goh Soon Huat; Goh V Shem; Hoon Thien How; Liew Daren; Lim Khim Wah; Tan Boon Heong; Tan Wee Kiong	Japan	Hiroyuki Endo; Hirokatsu Hashimoto; Kenichi Hayakawa; Noriyasu Hirata; Takeshi Kamura; Kento Momota; Sho Sasaki; Keigo Sonoda; Kenichi Tago; Takuma Ueda	2–3
Loss	Aug 2016	Summer Olympic Games, Rio de Janeiro, Brazil	Malaysia	–	China	Chen Long	0–2
Loss	April 2018	Commonwealth Games, Gold Coast, Australia	Malaysia	Chan Peng Soon; Soniia Cheah; Chow Mei Kuan; Goh Liu Ying; Goh Soon Huat; Goh V Shem; Vivian Hoo; Shevon Jemie Lai; Tan Wee Kiong	India	Pranaav Chopra; Ruthvika Shivani Gaade; Srikanth Kidambi; Saina Nehwal; Ashwini Ponnappa; Prannoy H. S. Venkata Sindhu Pusarla; Satwiksairaj Rankireddy; N. Sikki Reddy; Chirag Chandrashekhar Shetty	1–3
Win	Oct 2018	Commonwealth Games, Gold Coast, Australia	Malaysia	–	India	Srikanth Kidambi	2–1

=== Olympic Games (3 silver) ===
==== (13 wins – 4 losses) ====
Matches by tournament 2004 Athens Olympics (1–1) 2008 Beijing Olympics (4–1) 2012 London Olympics (4–1) 2016 Rio Olympics (4–1)	Olympic medals: 3 Silver medals: 3	Matches by medal finals Gold medal final (0–3)	Matches by type Singles (13–4)

==== Singles (13–4) ====
Result	No.	Year	Opponent	Rd	Score
Win	1	2004	(Hong Kong) Ng Wei	1R	15–3, 15–13
Loss	1	2004	(China) Chen Hong	2R	11–15, 15–3, 12–15
Win	2	2008	(Singapore) Ronald Susilo	2R	21–13, 21–14
Win	3	2008	(Lithuania) Kęstutis Navickas	3R	21–5, 21–7
Win	4	2008	(Indonesia) Sony Dwi Kuncoro	QF	21–9, 21–11
Win	5	2008	(South Korea) Lee Hyun-il	SF	21–18, 13–21, 21–13
Loss	2	2008	(China) Lin Dan	F	12–21, 8–21
Win	6	2012	(Finland) Ville Lång	RR	21–8, 14–21, 21–11
Win	7	2012	(Indonesia) Simon Santoso	2R	21–12, 21–8
Win	8	2012	(India) Parupalli Kashyap	QF	21–19, 21–11
Win	9	2012	(China) Chen Long	SF	21–13, 21–14
Loss	3	2012	(China) Lin Dan	F	21–15, 10–21, 19–21
Win	10	2016	(Suriname) Soren Opti	RR	21–2, 21–3
Win	11	2016	(Singapore) Derek Wong Zi Liang	2R	21–18, 21–8
Win	12	2016	(Chinese Taipei) Chou Tien-chen	QF	21–9, 21–15
Win	13	2016	(China) Lin Dan	SF	15–21, 21–11, 22–20
Loss	4	2016	(China) Chen Long	F	18–21, 18–21

=== Thomas Cup: 1 ===
==== (26 wins – 3 losses) ====
Matches by type Singles (26 – 3)	Matches by venue Malaysia (3–1) Away (23–2)

- ▲ ▼ indicates the result of the Thomas Cup match followed by the score, date, place of event, and its phase.

Result	No.	Match type (partner if any)	Opponent nation	Opponent player(s)	Score
▲5–0; 7 May 2004; Istora Gelora Bung Karno, Jakarta, Indonesia; Group C
Win	1	Singles	South Africa	Dean Potgieter	15–1, 15–1
▲5–0; 9 May 2004; Istora Gelora Bung Karno, Jakarta, Indonesia; Group C
Win	2	Singles	Thailand	Thirayu Laohathaimongkol	15–11, 15–3
▲5–0; 28 April 2006; Kamei Arena Sendai, Sendai, Japan; Group D
Win	3	Singles	United States	Raju Rai	21–9, 21–11
▲3–2; 3 May 2006; Tokyo Metropolitan Gymnasium, Tokyo, Japan; Quarterfinals
Win	4	Singles	South Korea	Lee Hyun-il	21–17, 21–14
▼2–3; 5 May 2006; Tokyo Metropolitan Gymnasium, Tokyo, Japan; Semifinals
Loss	1	Singles	Denmark	Peter Gade	19–21, 18–21
▲5–0; 11 May 2008; Istora Gelora Bung Karno, Jakarta, Indonesia; Group B
Win	5	Singles	England	Andrew Smith	21–17, 21–15
▲4–1; 12 May 2008; Istora Gelora Bung Karno, Jakarta, Indonesia; Group B
Win	6	Singles	South Korea	Shon Seung-mo	21–14, 21–14
▲3–0; 14 May 2008; Istora Gelora Bung Karno, Jakarta, Indonesia; Quarterfinals
Win	7	Singles	Japan	Shōji Satō	21–10, 21–16
▼2–3; 16 May 2008; Istora Gelora Bung Karno, Jakarta, Indonesia; Semifinals
Win	8	Singles	China	Lin Dan	21–12, 21–14
▲5–0; 9 May 2010; Putra Indoor Stadium, Kuala Lumpur, Malaysia; Group B
Win	9	Singles	(Niger) Nigeria	Fagbemi Olaoluwa	21–0, 21–0
▼2–3; 11 May 2010; Putra Indoor Stadium, Kuala Lumpur, Malaysia; Group B
Win	10	Singles	Japan	Kenichi Tago	21–12, 21–13
▲3–2; 12 May 2010; Putra Indoor Stadium, Kuala Lumpur, Malaysia; Quarterfinals
Win	11	Singles	Denmark	Peter Gade	21–17, 21–17
▼0–3; 14 May 2010; Putra Indoor Stadium, Kuala Lumpur, Malaysia; Semifinals
Loss	2	Singles	China	Lin Dan	17–21, 8–21
▲5–0; 21 May 2012; Wuhan Sports Center, Wuhan, China; Group C
Win	12	Singles	South Africa	Jacob Malieka	21–13, 21–10
▼2–3; 22 May 2012; Wuhan Sports Center, Wuhan, China; Group C
Loss	3	Singles	Denmark	Peter Gade	2^{r}–1
▲4–1; 18 May 2014; Siri Fort Sports Complex, New Delhi, India; Group C
Win	13	Singles	India	Srikanth Kidambi	21–19, 21–12
▲4–1; 19 May 2014; Siri Fort Sports Complex, New Delhi, India; Group C
Win	14	Singles	Germany	Marc Zwiebler	21–14, 21–8
▲3–2; 21 May 2014; Siri Fort Sports Complex, New Delhi, India; Group C
Win	15	Singles	South Korea	Son Wan-ho	21–17, 21–17
▲3–1; 22 May 2014; Siri Fort Sports Complex, New Delhi, India; Quarterfinals
Win	16	Singles	Denmark	Jan Ø. Jørgensen	21–17, 21–17
▲3–0; 23 May 2014; Siri Fort Sports Complex, New Delhi, India; Semifinals
Win	17	Singles	Indonesia	Tommy Sugiarto	21–19, 21–13
▼2–3; 25 May 2014; Siri Fort Sports Complex, New Delhi, India; Final
Win	18	Singles	Japan	Kenichi Tago	21–12, 21–16
▲4–1; 15 May 2016; Kunshan Sports Centre, Jiangsu, China; Group C
Win	19	Singles	England	Toby Penty	21–15, 21–11
▲5–0; 16 May 2016; Kunshan Sports Centre, Jiangsu, China; Group C
Win	20	Singles	Germany	Kai Schaefer	21–19, 21–15
▲3–2; 17 May 2016; Kunshan Sports Centre, Jiangsu, China; Group C
Win	21	Singles	South Korea	Son Wan-ho	21–18, 21–15
▲3–1; 19 May 2016; Kunshan Sports Centre, Jiangsu, China; Quarterfinals
Win	22	Singles	Chinese Taipei	Chou Tien-chen	21–18, 21–18
▼2–3; 20 May 2016; Kunshan Sports Centre, Jiangsu, China; Semifinals
Win	23	Singles	Denmark	Viktor Axelsen	23–21, 21–18
▲5–0; 21 May 2018; IMPACT Arena, Bangkok, Thailand; Group D
Win	24	Singles	Russia	Vladimir Malkov	21–9, 21–6
▼2–3; 23 May 2018; IMPACT Arena, Bangkok, Thailand; Group D
Win	25	Singles	Denmark	Viktor Axelsen	21–9, 21–19
▼1–3; 24 May 2018; IMPACT Arena, Bangkok, Thailand; Quarterfinals
Win	26	Singles	Indonesia	Anthony Sinisuka Ginting	21–19, 21–16

=== Sudirman Cup ===
==== (18 wins – 1 loss) ====
Matches by type Singles (18 – 1)	Matches by venue Malaysia (2–0) Away (16–1)

- ▲ ▼ indicates the result of the Sudirman Cup match followed by the score, date, place of event, and its phase.

Result	No.	Match type (partner if any)	Opponent nation	Opponent player(s)	Score
▼2–3; 11 June 2007; Scotstoun Stadium, Glasgow, Scotland; Group A
Win	1	Singles	England	Andrew Smith	21–10, 21–10
▲3–2; 12 June 2007; Scotstoun Stadium, Glasgow, Scotland; Group A
Win	2	Singles	Thailand	Boonsak Ponsana	21–15, 21–16
▼1–4; 14 June 2007; Scotstoun Stadium, Glasgow, Scotland; Group A
Win	3	Singles	China	Lin Dan	21–17, 21–17
▼2–3; 15 June 2007; Scotstoun Stadium, Glasgow, Scotland; 5th/6th Play-offs
Win	4	Singles	Denmark	Kenneth Jonassen	21–9, 21–11
▼2–3; 10 May 2009; Guangzhou Gymnasium, Guangzhou, China; Group A
Win	5	Singles	South Korea	Jang Young-soo	21–9, 21–13
▲4–1; 11 May 2009; Guangzhou Gymnasium, Guangzhou, China; Group A
Win	6	Singles	Hong Kong	Hu Yun	21–16, 21–8
▲3–2; 14 May 2009; Guangzhou Gymnasium, Guangzhou, China; Group A
Win	7	Singles	Denmark	Jan Ø. Jørgensen	21–11, 21–18
▼0–3; 16 May 2009; Guangzhou Gymnasium, Guangzhou, China; Semifinals
Loss	1	Singles	China	Lin Dan	16–21, 16–21
▲4–1; 23 May 2011; Guoxin Gymnasium, Qingdao, China; Group 1B
Win	8	Singles	Russia	Ivan Sozonov	21–9, 21–10
▼2–3; 25 May 2011; Guoxin Gymnasium, Qingdao, China; Group 1B
Win	9	Singles	Indonesia	Dionysius Hayom Rumbaka	21–8, 21–8
▼2–3; 26 May 2011; Guoxin Gymnasium, Qingdao, China; Quarterfinals
Win	10	Singles	South Korea	Park Sung-hwan	21–18, 21–14
▼2–3; 19 May 2013; Putra Indoor Stadium, Kuala Lumpur, Malaysia; Group 1C
Win	11	Singles	Chinese Taipei	Yang Chih-hsun	21–8, 21–13
▼2–3; 21 May 2013; Putra Indoor Stadium, Kuala Lumpur, Malaysia; Group 1C
Win	12	Singles	Germany	Dieter Domke	21–18, 21–18
▲3–2; 10 May 2015; Dongfeng Nissan Sports Center, Dongguan, China; Group 1D
Win	13	Singles	South Korea	Lee Dong-keun	21–12, 21–10
▲3–2; 11 May 2015; Dongfeng Nissan Sports Center, Dongguan, China; Group 1D
Win	14	Singles	India	Srikanth Kidambi	21–16, 21–15
▼2–3; 14 May 2015; Dongfeng Nissan Sports Center, Dongguan, China; Quarterfinals
Win	15	Singles	South Korea	Son Wan-ho	21–17, 21–12
▲5–0; 23 May 2017; Carrara Sports and Leisure Centre, Gold Coast, Australia; Group 1C
Win	16	Singles	Germany	Fabian Roth	21–12, 21–11
▼2–3; 24 May 2017; Carrara Sports and Leisure Centre, Gold Coast, Australia; Group 1C
Win	17	Singles	Japan	Yu Igarashi	21–8, 21–5
▼1–3; 26 May 2017; Carrara Sports and Leisure Centre, Gold Coast, Australia; Quarterfinals
Win	18	Singles	Japan	Kenta Nishimoto	21–15, 21–13

=== Asian Games: 1 ===
==== (10 wins – 6 losses) ====
Matches by type Singles (10–6)	Matches by category Team (2–3) Individual (8–3)

- ▲ ▼ indicates the result of the Asian Games match followed by the score, date, place of event, and its phase.

==== Singles – Team (2–3) ====
Result	No.	Match type (partner if any)	Opponent team	Opponent player(s)	Score
▲5–0; 30 November 2006; Aspire Zone, Doha, Qatar; Pool C
Win	1	Singles – Team	Japan	Shōji Satō	21–10, 21–18
▼1–3; 4 December 2006; Aspire Zone, Doha, Qatar; Semifinals
Loss	1	Singles – Team	South Korea	Lee Hyun-il	19–21, 19–21
▼2–3; 13 November 2010; Tianhe Gymnasium, Guangzhou, China; Quarterfinals
Loss	2	Singles – Team	Thailand	Boonsak Ponsana	21–9, 10–21, 19–21
▲3–0; 21 September 2014; Gyeyang Gymnasium, Incheon, South Korea; Quarterfinals
Win	2	Singles – Team	Nepal	Ratnajit Tamang	21–10, 21–12
▼0–3; 22 September 2014; Gyeyang Gymnasium, Incheon, South Korea; Semifinals
Loss	3	Singles – Team	China	Chen Long	17–21, 21–19, 11–21

==== Singles – Individual (8–3) ====
Result	No.	Match type (partner if any)	Opponent team	Opponent player(s)	Score
▲2–0; 6 December 2006; Aspire Zone, Doha, Qatar; Round of 16
Win	1	Singles – Individual	Japan	Shōji Satō	21–17, 21–18
▲2–1; 7 December 2006; Aspire Zone, Doha, Qatar; Quarterfinals
Win	2	Singles – Individual	Thailand	Boonsak Ponsana	20–22, 21–11, 21–7
▼0–2; 8 December 2006; Aspire Zone, Doha, Qatar; Semifinals
Loss	1	Singles – Individual	Indonesia	Taufik Hidayat	16–21, 18–21
▲2–1; 18 November 2010; Tianhe Gymnasium, Guangzhou, China; Round of 16
Win	3	Singles – Individual	Hong Kong	Chan Yan Kit	17–21, 21–9, 21–6
▲2–0; 19 November 2010; Tianhe Gymnasium, Guangzhou, China; Quarterfinals
Win	4	Singles – Individual	(Hong Kong) Thailand	Boonsak Ponsana	21–13, 21–17
▲2–1; 20 November 2010; Tianhe Gymnasium, Guangzhou, China; Semifinals
Win	5	Singles – Individual	China	Chen Jin	14–21, 21–15, 21–7
▼1–2; 21 November 2010; Tianhe Gymnasium, Guangzhou, China; Final
Loss	2	Singles – Individual	China	Lin Dan	13–21, 21–15, 10–21
▲2–0; 25 September 2014; Gyeyang Gymnasium, Incheon, South Korea; Round of 32
Win	6	Singles – Individual	Pakistan	Umer Zeeshan	21–14, 21–6
▲2–0; 26 September 2014; Gyeyang Gymnasium, Incheon, South Korea; Round of 16
Win	7	Singles – Individual	India	Parupalli Kashyap	21–12, 21–11
▲2–1; 27 September 2014; Gyeyang Gymnasium, Incheon, South Korea; Quarterfinals
Win	8	Singles – Individual	Vietnam	Nguyễn Tiến Minh	21–23, 21–16, 21–17
▼1–2; 28 September 2014; Gyeyang Gymnasium, Incheon, South Korea; Semifinals
Loss	3	Singles – Individual	China	Lin Dan	20–22, 21–12, 9–21

=== Commonwealth Games: 6 (5 titles) ===
==== (28 wins – 1 loss) ====
Matches by type Singles (28–1)	Matches by category Team (13–1) Individual (15–0)

- ▲ ▼ indicates the result of the Commonwealth Games match followed by the score, date and place of event.

==== Singles – Team (13–1) ====
Result	No.	Match type (partner if any)	Opponent team	Opponent player(s)	Score
▲5–0; 16 March 2006; Melbourne Convention and Exhibition Centre, Melbourne, Australia; Group
Win	1	Singles – Team	Fiji	Burty James Molia	21–12, 21–10
▲5–0; 17 March 2006; Melbourne Convention and Exhibition Centre, Melbourne, Australia; Group
Win	2	Singles – Team	Northern Ireland	Alexander Padraig Samuel Sim	21–5, 21–6
▲3–0; 18 March 2006; Melbourne Convention and Exhibition Centre, Melbourne, Australia; Quarterfinals
Win	3	Singles – Team	Australia	Stuart Brehaut	21–7, 21–11
▲3–1; 19 March 2006; Melbourne Convention and Exhibition Centre, Melbourne, Australia; Semifinals
Win	4	Singles – Team	New Zealand	Geoff Bellingham	21–17, 21–5
▲3–1; 20 March 2006; Melbourne Convention and Exhibition Centre, Melbourne, Australia; Final
Win	5	Singles – Team	England	Aamir Ghaffar	21–8, 21–8
▲5–0; 4 October 2010; Siri Fort Sports Complex, New Delhi, India; Group A
Win	6	Singles – Team	Isle of Man	Joshua Green	21–16, 21–6
▲5–0; 6 October 2010; Siri Fort Sports Complex, New Delhi, India; Group A
Win	7	Singles – Team	Australia	Nicholas Kidd	21–17, 21–8
▲3–1; 7 October 2010; Siri Fort Sports Complex, New Delhi, India; Semifinals
Win	8	Singles – Team	Singapore	Derek Wong	21–19, 21–18
▲3–1; 8 October 2010; Siri Fort Sports Complex, New Delhi, India; Final
Win	9	Singles – Team	India	Parupalli Kashyap	21–18, 21–7
▲5–0; 5 April 2018; Gold Coast Sports and Leisure Centre, Gold Coast, Australia; Pool D
Win	10	Singles – Team	Ghana	Daniel Sam	21–2, 21–7
▲4–1; 6 April 2018; Gold Coast Sports and Leisure Centre, Gold Coast, Australia; Pool D
Win	11	Singles – Team	Canada	Jason Ho-shue	21–6, 21–5
▲3–0; 7 April 2018; Gold Coast Sports and Leisure Centre, Gold Coast, Australia; Quarterfinals
Win	12	Singles – Team	Scotland	Kieran Merrilees	21–14, 21–7
▲3–0; 8 April 2018; Gold Coast Sports and Leisure Centre, Gold Coast, Australia; Semifinals
Win	13	Singles – Team	England	Rajiv Ouseph	21–18, 21–16
▼1–3; 9 April 2018; Gold Coast Sports and Leisure Centre, Gold Coast, Australia; Final
Loss	1	Singles – Team	India	Srikanth Kidambi	17–21, 14–21

==== Singles – Individual (15–0) ====
Result	No.	Match type (partner if any)	Opponent team	Opponent player(s)	Score
▲2–0; 22 March 2006; Melbourne Convention and Exhibition Centre, Melbourne, Australia; Round of 32
Win	1	Singles – Individual	South Africa	Dorian Lance James	21–7, 21–6
▲2–0; 23 March 2006; Melbourne Convention and Exhibition Centre, Melbourne, Australia; Round of 16
Win	2	Singles – Individual	Canada	Philippe Bourret	21–6, 21–4
▲2–0; 24 March 2006; Melbourne Convention and Exhibition Centre, Melbourne, Australia; Quarterfinals
Win	3	Singles – Individual	India	Anup Sridhar	21–15, 21–18
▲2–0; 24 March 2006; Melbourne Convention and Exhibition Centre, Melbourne, Australia; Semifinals
Win	4	Singles – Individual	England	Aamir Ghaffar	21–8, 21–9
▲2–0; 26 March 2006; Melbourne Convention and Exhibition Centre, Melbourne, Australia; Final
Win	5	Singles – Individual	Malaysia	Wong Choong Hann	21–13, 21–12
▲2–0; 10 October 2010; Siri Fort Sports Complex, New Delhi, India; Round of 32
Win	6	Singles – Individual	Canada	Alex Pang	21–11, 21–10
▲2–0; 11 October 2010; Siri Fort Sports Complex, New Delhi, India; Round of 16
Win	7	Singles – Individual	Zambia	Juma Muwowo	21–9, 21–9
▲2–0; 11 October 2010; Siri Fort Sports Complex, New Delhi, India; Quarterfinals
Win	8	Singles – Individual	Singapore	Ashton Chen	21–13, 21–11
▲2–0; 12 October 2010; Siri Fort Sports Complex, New Delhi, India; Semifinals
Win	9	Singles – Individual	India	Chetan Anand	21–11, 21–12
▲2–0; 14 October 2010; Siri Fort Sports Complex, New Delhi, India; Final
Win	10	Singles – Individual	England	Rajiv Ouseph	21–10, 21–8
▲2–0; 11 April 2018; Gold Coast Sports and Leisure Centre, Gold Coast, Australia; Round of 32
Win	11	Singles – Individual	Isle of Man	Benjamin Li	21–6, 21–3
▲2–0; 12 April 2018; Gold Coast Sports and Leisure Centre, Gold Coast, Australia; Round of 16
Win	12	Singles – Individual	Uganda	Brian Kasirye	21–6, 21–6
▲2–0; 13 April 2018; Gold Coast Sports and Leisure Centre, Gold Coast, Australia; Quarterfinals
Win	13	Singles – Individual	Singapore	Loh Kean Yew	21–13, 21–16
▲2–1; 14 April 2018; Gold Coast Sports and Leisure Centre, Gold Coast, Australia; Semifinals
Win	14	Singles – Individual	India	Prannoy H. S.	21–16, 9–21, 21–14
▲2–1; 15 April 2018; Gold Coast Sports and Leisure Centre, Gold Coast, Australia; Final
Win	15	Singles – Individual	India	Srikanth Kidambi	19–21, 21–14, 21–14

==== Wins: 5 ====
Edition	Team Malaysia	Rounds/Opponents
2006 Commonwealth Games	Chan Chong Ming; Choong Tan Fook; Koo Kien Keat; Lee Chong Wei; Ooi Sock Ai; Wong Choong Hann; Wong Mew Choo; Wong Pei Tty; Julia Wong Pei Xian	RR: MAS 5–0 FIJ; RR: MAS 5–0 NIR; RR: MAS 5–0 SRI; QF: MAS 3–0 AUS; SF: MAS 3–1 NZL; F: MAS 3–1 ENG
2006 Commonwealth Games	–	1R: Bye; 2R: MAS 2–0 RSA; 3R: MAS 2–0 CAN; QF: MAS 2–0 IND; SF: MAS 2–0 ENG; F: MAS 2–0 MAS
2010 Commonwealth Games	Chan Peng Soon; Lyddia Cheah; Chin Eei Hui; Goh Liu Ying; Muhammad Hafiz Hashim; Koo Kien Keat; Lee Chong Wei; Tan Boon Heong; Wong Mew Choo; Woon Khe Wei	RR: MAS 5–0 IMN; RR: MAS 5–0 SEY; RR: MAS 5–0 NIG; RR: MAS 5–0 AUS; QF: MAS 3–0 NZL; RR: MAS 3–1 SIN; F: MAS 3–1 IND
2010 Commonwealth Games	–	1R: Bye; 2R: MAS 2–0 CAN; 3R: MAS 2–0 ZAM; QF: MAS 2–0 SIN; SF: MAS 2–0 IND; F: MAS 2–0 ENG
2018 Commonwealth Games	–	1R: Bye; 2R: MAS 2–0 IOM; 3R: MAS 2–0 UGA; QF: MAS 2–0 SIN; SF: MAS 2–1 IND; F: MAS 2–1 IND

=== SEA Games: 1 (1 title) ===
==== (4 wins – 2 losses) ====
Matches by type Singles (1–1)	Matches by category Team (3–1) Individual (1–1)

- ▲ ▼ indicates the result of the SEA Games match followed by the score, date and place of event.

==== Singles – Team (3–1) ====
Result	No.	Match type (partner if any)	Opponent team	Opponent player(s)	Score
▲3–0; 29 November 2005; PhilSports Arena, Pasig, Philippines; Semifinals
Win	1	Singles – Team	Thailand	Boonsak Ponsana	15–9, 11–15, 15–11
▲3–2; 30 November 2005; PhilSports Arena, Pasig, Philippines; Final
Loss	1	Singles – Team	Indonesia	Taufik Hidayat	13–15, 7–15
▲3–0; 10 June 2015; Singapore Indoor Stadium, Kallang, Singapore; Quarterfinals
Win	2	Singles – Team	Cambodia	Cheng Phor Rom	21–10, 21–5
▼2–3; 11 June 2015; Singapore Indoor Stadium, Kallang, Singapore; Semifinals
Win	3	Singles – Team	Indonesia	Firman Abdul Kholik	21–19, 21–10

==== Singles – Individual (1–1) ====
Result	No.	Match type (partner if any)	Opponent team	Opponent player(s)	Score
▲2–1; 1 December 2005; PhilSports Arena, Pasig, Philippines; Quarterfinals
Win	1	Singles – Individual	Vietnam	Nguyễn Tiến Minh	10–15, 17–14, 15–8
▼0–2; 2 December 2005; PhilSports Arena, Pasig, Philippines; Semifinals
Loss	1	Singles – Individual	Indonesia	Simon Santoso	11–15, 9–15

==== Wins: 1 ====
Edition	Team Malaysia	Rounds/Opponents
2005 SEA Games	Chan Chong Ming; Choong Tan Fook; Muhammad Hafiz Hashim; Koo Kien Keat; Kuan Beng Hong; Lee Chong Wei; Lee Wan Wah; Wong Choong Hann	QF: Bye; SF: MAS 3–0 THA; F: MAS 3–2 INA

=== Asia Team Championships ===
==== (3 wins – 0 loss) ====
Matches by type Singles (3–0)	Matches by venue Malaysia (3–0) Away (0–0)

- ▲ ▼ indicates the result of the Asia Team Championships match followed by the score, date and place of event.

Result	No.	Match type (partner if any)	Opponent team	Opponent player(s)	Score
▼2–3; 6 February 2018; Sultan Abdul Halim Stadium, Alor Setar, Malaysia; Group C
Win	1	Singles	Thailand	Khosit Phetpradab	21–13, 21–9
▲5–0; 8 February 2018; Sultan Abdul Halim Stadium, Alor Setar, Malaysia; Group C
Win	2	Singles	Chinese Taipei	Wang Tzu-wei	17–21, 21–13, 21–15
▲3–0; 9 February 2018; Sultan Abdul Halim Stadium, Alor Setar, Malaysia; Quarterfinals
Win	3	Singles	Hong Kong	Ng Ka Long Angus	21–15, 22–20

== See also ==
- Lee–Lin rivalry
