= 2014 BWF World Championships – Men's singles =

Badminton tournament results

Men's singles at the 2014 BWF World Championships
- Venue: Ballerup Super Arena
- Location: Copenhagen, Denmark
- Dates: August 25, 2014 – August 31, 2014

Medalists
gold medal	Chen Long	China
silver medal	~~Lee Chong Wei~~	Malaysia
bronze medal	Viktor Axelsen	Denmark
bronze medal	Tommy Sugiarto	Indonesia

The men's singles tournament of the 2014 BWF World Championships (World Badminton Championships) took place from August 25 to 31. Lin Dan was not given wild card entry into the 2014 World Championships, as he was in 2013.

On 27 April 2015, Lee Chong Wei was stripped of his silver medal due to doping.

== Seeds ==
1. (Malaysia) Lee Chong Wei (final)
2. (China) Chen Long (champion)
3. (Denmark) Jan Ø. Jørgensen (third round, withdrew)
4. (Japan) Kenichi Tago (first round, withdrew)
5. (Indonesia) Tommy Sugiarto (semifinals)
6. (China) Wang Zhengming (quarterfinals)
7. (South Korea) Shon Wan-ho (quarterfinals)
8. (Indonesia) Simon Santoso (first round, withdrew)

9. (Hong Kong) Hu Yun (third round)
10. (Denmark) Hans-Kristian Vittinghus (third round)
11. (China) Tian Houwei (second round)
12. (Thailand) Boonsak Ponsana (first round, withdrew)
13. (Japan) Kento Momota (first round)
14. (Denmark) Viktor Axelsen (semifinals)
15. (Japan) Sho Sasaki (second round)
16. (Malaysia) Chong Wei Feng (first round)

Click on the seed number of a player to go to their draw section.

== Draw ==
=== Finals ===
Semi-finals
1	(Malaysia) Lee Chong Wei	21	21
14	(Denmark) Viktor Axelsen	9	7
5	(Indonesia) Tommy Sugiarto	16	20
2	(China) Chen Long	21	22

Final
1	(Malaysia) Lee Chong Wei	19	19
2	(China) Chen Long	21	21

=== Section 1 ===
First Round
1	(Malaysia) Lee C W	21	21
(South Korea) Lee D-k	11	12
(India) K Parupalli	24	21	8
(Germany) D Domke	26	13	21
12	(Thailand) B Ponsana
(Republic of Ireland) S Evans	WO
(Brazil) D Paiola	21	11	17
(Austria) D Obernosterer	17	21	21
6	(China) Wang ZM	21	21
(Poland) M Rogalski	15	12
(Czech Republic) P Koukal	21	21
(Russia) V Ivanov	19	16
13	(Japan) K Momota	21	18	11
(Hong Kong) Wei N	19	21	21
(Ukraine) V Atrashchenkov	21	17	16
(Sri Lanka) D Karunaratne	18	21	21

Second Round
1	(Malaysia) Lee C W	21	21
(Germany) D Domke	12	9
(Republic of Ireland) S Evans	21	21
(Austria) D Obernosterer	7	18
6	(China) Wang ZM	21	19	21
(Czech Republic) P Koukal	15	21	7
(Hong Kong) Wei N	19	21	21
(Sri Lanka) D Karunaratne	21	16	13

Third Round
1	(Malaysia) Lee C W	21	21
(Republic of Ireland) S Evans	11	12
6	(China) Wang ZM	21	21
(Hong Kong) Wei N	15	18

Quarterfinals
1	(Malaysia) Lee C W	21	21
6	(China) Wang ZM	8	13

=== Section 2 ===
First Round
3	(Denmark) J Ø Jørgensen	21	21
(Belgium) M Moreels	15	11
(Finland) E Heino	21	21
(Italy) G Greco	11	13
15	(Japan) S Sasaki	21	21
(Cuba) O Guerrero	13	15
(Estonia) R Must	21	18	17
(Chinese Taipei) Chou T-c	16	21	21
8	(Indonesia) S Santoso
(Spain) P Abián	WO
(United States) H Shu	16	17
(Vietnam) Nguyen T M	21	21
14	(Denmark) V Axelsen	21	21
(Sweden) H Hurskainen	14	15
(New Zealand) J Wu	16	13
(Netherlands) E Meijs	21	21

Second Round
3	(Denmark) J Ø Jørgensen	21	21
(Finland) Eetu Heino	9	17
15	(Japan) S Sasaki	16	19
(Chinese Taipei) Chou T-c	21	21
(Spain) P Abián	7	21	10
(Vietnam) Nguyen T M	21	19	21
14	(Denmark) V Axelsen	21	21
(Netherlands) E Meijs	9	10

Third Round
3	(Denmark) J Ø Jørgensen	9	4Re
(Chinese Taipei) Chou T-c	21	9
(Vietnam) Nguyen T M	16	17
14	(Denmark) V Axelsen	21	21

Quarterfinals
(Chinese Taipei) Chou T-c	14	14
14	(Denmark) V Axelsen	21	21

=== Section 3 ===
First Round
(Israel) M Zilberman	21	14	14
(Finland) V Lång	11	21	21
(Brazil) A Y Tjong	15	17
9	(Hong Kong) Hu Y	21	21
(Ukraine) D Zavadsky	6	13
(Russia) V Malkov	21	21
(Singapore) D Wong	12	14
5	(Indonesia) T Sugiarto	21	21
(Sweden) M Borg	11	8
(Netherlands) E Pang	21	21
(Japan) T Ueda	16	21	14
11	(China) Tian HW	21	12	21
(Thailand) T Saensomboonsuk	21	21
(Scotland) K Merrilees	16	17
(India) A Jayaram	WO
4	(Japan) K Tago

Second Round
(Finland) V Lång	21	15	17
9	(Hong Kong) Hu Y	17	21	21
(Russia) V Malkov	16	13
5	(Indonesia) T Sugiarto	21	21
(Netherlands) E Pang	21	21
11	(China) Tian HW	15	16
(Thailand) T Saensomboonsuk	21	21
(India) A Jayaram	17	14

Third Round
9	(Hong Kong) Hu Y	10	11
5	(Indonesia) T Sugiarto	21	21
(Netherlands) E Pang	19	21	21
(Thailand) T Saensomboonsuk	21	18	16

Quarterfinals
5	(Indonesia) T Sugiarto	22	21
(Netherlands) E Pang	20	19

=== Section 4 ===
First Round
(Czech Republic) J Frohlich	14	17
(Belgium) Y Tan	21	21
(Chinese Taipei) Hsu J-h	17	11
10	(Denmark) H-K Vittinghus	21	21
(United States) S Pongnairat	21	21
(South Africa) J Maliekal	16	16
(France) B Leverdez	22	12	19
7	(South Korea) Shon W-h	20	21	21
(India) S Kidambi	21	11	21
(Slovenia) I Utrosa	11	21	12
(England) R Ouseph	17	24	21
16	(Malaysia) Chong W F	21	22	16
(Germany) M Zwiebler	21	21
(Sri Lanka) N Karunaratne	18	11
(Austria) L Wraber	8	10
2	(China) Chen L	21	21

Second Round
(Belgium) Y Tan	18	15
10	(Denmark) H-K Vittinghus	21	21
(United States) S Pongnairat	6	12
7	(South Korea) Shon W-h	21	21
(India) S Kidambi	21	21
(England) R Ouseph	18	13
(Germany) M Zwiebler	11	10
2	(China) Chen L	21	21

Third Round
10	(Denmark) H-K Vittinghus	19	12
7	(South Korea) Shon W-h	21	21
(India) S Kidambi	12	10
2	(China) Chen L	21	21

Quarterfinals
7	(South Korea) Shon W-h	14	21	17
2	(China) Chen L	21	12	21
