= Badminton at the 2010 Asian Games – Men's singles =

Men's singles at the 2010 Asian Games
- Venue: Tianhe Gymnasium
- Dates: 17–21 November
- Competitors: 29 from 16 nations

Medalists
gold medal	Lin Dan	China
silver medal	Lee Chong Wei	Malaysia
bronze medal	Chen Jin	China
bronze medal	Park Sung-hwan	South Korea

The badminton men's singles tournament at the 2010 Asian Games in Guangzhou took place from 17 November to 21 November at Tianhe Gymnasium.

== Schedule ==
All times are China Standard Time (UTC+08:00)

Date	Time	Event
Wednesday, 17 November 2010	09:00	Round of 32
Thursday, 18 November 2010	09:00	Round of 16
Friday, 19 November 2010	09:00	Quarterfinals
Saturday, 20 November 2010	19:30	Semifinals
Sunday, 21 November 2010	20:30	Final

== Results ==
Legend

- WO — Won by walkover

=== Final ===
Final
1	Lee Chong Wei (MAS)	13	21	10
2	Lin Dan (CHN)	21	15	21

=== Top half ===
Round of 32
Chan Yan Kit (HKG)	21	21
Mohamed Sharim (MDV)	4	7
6	Boonsak Ponsana (THA)	21	21
Chan Io Chong (MAC)	13	9
Niluka Karunaratne (SRI)
Arvind Bhat (IND)	W	O
Sajan Krishna Tamrakar (NEP)	5	7
Lee Hyun-il (KOR)	21	21
7	Sony Dwi Kuncoro (INA)	13	21	17
Chou Tien-chen (TPE)	21	14	21
Kazushi Yamada (JPN)	21	21
Olonbayaryn Enkhbat (MGL)	2	10

Round of 16
1	Lee Chong Wei (MAS)	17	21	21
Chan Yan Kit (HKG)	21	9	6
6	Boonsak Ponsana (THA)	21	21
Arvind Bhat (IND)	19	12
3	Chen Jin (CHN)	21	21
Lee Hyun-il (KOR)	17	11
Chou Tien-chen (TPE)	21	21
Kazushi Yamada (JPN)	15	15

Quarterfinals
1	Lee Chong Wei (MAS)	21	21
6	Boonsak Ponsana (THA)	13	17
3	Chen Jin (CHN)	21	21
Chou Tien-chen (TPE)	19	14

Semifinals
1	Lee Chong Wei (MAS)	14	21	21
3	Chen Jin (CHN)	21	15	7

=== Bottom half ===
Round of 32
Bikash Shrestha (NEP)	10	8
Mohd Hafiz Hashim (MAS)	21	21
Park Sung-hwan (KOR)	21	21
8	Kenichi Tago (JPN)	13	14
Dinuka Karunaratne (SRI)	21	21
Mohamed Ajfan Rasheed (MDV)	17	8
Hsieh Yu-hsing (TPE)	16	12
4	Taufik Hidayat (INA)	21	21
Tanongsak Saensomboonsuk (THA)	21	21
Pürevsürengiin Sainbuyan (MGL)	9	12
Parupalli Kashyap (IND)	14	20
5	Nguyễn Tiến Minh (VIE)	21	22
Hu Yun (HKG)	21	21
Yara Azad (IRQ)	18	9

Round of 16
Mohd Hafiz Hashim (MAS)	18	16
Park Sung-hwan (KOR)	21	21
Dinuka Karunaratne (SRI)	14	9
4	Taufik Hidayat (INA)	21	21
Tanongsak Saensomboonsuk (THA)	18	13
5	Nguyễn Tiến Minh (VIE)	21	21
Hu Yun (HKG)	6	13
2	Lin Dan (CHN)	21	21

Quarterfinals
Park Sung-hwan (KOR)	21	21
4	Taufik Hidayat (INA)	15	16
5	Nguyễn Tiến Minh (VIE)	9	16
2	Lin Dan (CHN)	21	21

Semifinals
Park Sung-hwan (KOR)	14	10
2	Lin Dan (CHN)	21	21
