= Tey Seu Bock =

Malaysian badminton coach

Tey Seu Bock 郑瑞睦
Personal information
- Born: 21 February 1973 (age 53) Alor Gajah District, Malacca, Malaysia
- Years active: 1991–1995

Sport
- Country: Malaysia
- Sport: Badminton
- Handedness: Right
- Event: Men's singles & doubles

Men's singles & doubles
- BWF profile

Tey Seu Bock
- Traditional Chinese: 鄭瑞睦
- Simplified Chinese: 郑瑞睦
Transcriptions
Standard Mandarin
- Hanyu Pinyin: Zhèng Ruì Mù
Yue: Cantonese
- Jyutping: Zeng6 Seoi6 Muk6
Southern Min
- Hokkien POJ: Tēⁿ Sūi-bo̍k
- Tâi-lô: Tēnn Suī-bo̍k

Datuk Tey Seu Bock DPSM (born 21 February 1973) is a retired Malaysian professional badminton player. He is most well known for being the coach of three-time Olympic silver medalist and former world No. 1 badminton men's singles shuttler Lee Chong Wei between 2010 and 2016. Tey currently serves as coach of the men's singles department at the Badminton Association of Malaysia (BAM).

As a player, he was active in both men's singles and doubles until his retirement.

== Background ==
Tey was born in Pengkalan Balak in the Malaysian state of Malacca. Following limited success in his playing career, he turned to coaching and remained as an assistant to Misbun Sidek for a large number of years acting as sparring partner to players such as Rashid Sidek, Muhammad Roslin Hashim and eventually Lee himself. He once ventured into the kopi tiam (traditional coffee shop) business in an attempt to strengthen his financial situation but the business failed after a year.

== Career ==
=== 1995 ===
Men's Doubles

Year	Tournament	Round	Partner	Opponent	Score
1995	Brunei Open	Round of 32	(Malaysia) Rahman Sidek	(Indonesia) Dodi (Indonesia) Hermono Yuwono	14-17 9-15

=== 1994 ===
Men's Singles

Year	Tournament	Round	Opponent	Score
1994	German Open	Qualification	(Germany) Holger Kampen	15-7 15-4
1994	German Open	Qualification	(Germany) Franz Josef Mueller	15-9 15-3
1994	German Open	Round of 64	(Germany) Volker Renzelmann	15-8 15-12
1994	German Open	Round of 32	(Sweden) Tomas Johansson	8-15 9-15
1994	Dutch Open	Round of 64	(Indonesia) Budi Santoso	4-15 7-15
1994	Indonesia Open	Round of 64	(Indonesia) Hendrawan	11-15 10-15
1994	Brunei Open	Round of 64	(Philippines) Wilfred Albo	15-2 15-4
1994	Brunei Open	Round of 32	(Indonesia) Jeffer Rosobin	5-15 2-15
1994	Singapore Open	Qualification	(Singapore) Noor Izwan Paini	15-0 15-2
1994	Singapore Open	Qualification	(Singapore) Kok Keong Desmond Tan	15-1 15-14
1994	Singapore Open	Qualification	(Malaysia) Saman Ismail	9-15 15-4 15-11
1994	Singapore Open	Round of 64	(Netherlands) Jeroen Van Dijk	5-15 15-12 9-15
1994	Malaysia Open	Round of 64	(Indonesia) Ardy Wiranata	2-15 3-15

=== 1993 ===
Men's Singles

Year	Tournament	Round	Opponent	Score
1993	Brunei Open	Round of 32	(Philippines) Antonio Jr Mance	15-7 11-15 15-4
1993	Brunei Open	Round of 16	(Thailand) Kitipon Kitikul	15-5 15-13
1993	Brunei Open	Quarterfinal	(Malaysia) Kantharoopan Ponniah	6-15 15-11 9-15
1993	Malaysia Open	Round of 64	(Japan) Takuya Katayama	15-10 15-6
1993	Malaysia Open	Round of 32	(Finland) Pontus Jäntti	6-15 10-15

Men's Doubles

Year	Tournament	Round	Partner	Opponent	Score
1993	Brunei Open	Round of 32	(Malaysia) Ah Heng Lo	(Brunei) Wahab Moksin (Brunei) Hj Yusof	15-4 15-5
1993	Brunei Open	Round of 16	(Malaysia) Ah Heng Lo	(Indonesia) Gunawan (Brunei) Al-Muhtadee Billah	18-17 1-15 15-4
1993	Brunei Open	Quarterfinal	(Malaysia) Ah Heng Lo	(Thailand) Kitipon Kitikul (Thailand) Prapon Prapaitrakul	6-15 2-15
1993	Malaysia Open	Round of 32	(Malaysia) Ah Heng Lo	(Indonesia) Rexy Mainaky (Indonesia) Ricky Subagja	2-15 3-15

=== 1992 ===
Men's Singles

Year	Tournament	Round	Opponent	Score
1992	Malaysia Open	Round of 128	(Australia) Yifeng Shen	8-15 15-11 14-17

=== 1991 ===
Men's Singles

Year	Tournament	Round	Opponent	Score
1991	Singapore Open	Qualification		
1991	Singapore Open	Qualification	(Japan) Yuzo Kubota	15-7 10-15 15-13
1991	Singapore Open	Qualification	(India) Bhawin Gala	12-15 9-15
1991	Malaysia Open	Qualification	(Tanzania) Ibrahim Sadru	Walkover
1991	Malaysia Open	Qualification	(Mexico) Luis Lopezllera	Walkover
1991	Malaysia Open	Qualification	(India) Dipankar Bhattacharjee	7-15 8-15

Men's Doubles

Year	Tournament	Round	Partner	Opponent	Score
1991	Malaysia Open	Qualification	(Malaysia) D. Jivehenthiran	Bye	
1991	Malaysia Open	Qualification	(Malaysia) D. Jivehenthiran	(Denmark) Liwen Lin (China) Jianjun Liu	6-15 8-15

BWF International Series tournament

== Coaching ==
Tey joined the BAM in 2002 and became an understudy to Misbun Sidek. Following Misbun's resignation from the BAM in 2010, Tey was chosen to take over coaching responsibilities of the men's singles department and take world No. 1 Lee Chong Wei under his wing. Under his watch, Lee would go on to clinch, among many, two more Olympic silver medals, four world championships silver medals and three All England Open Badminton Championships men's singles titles.

Following the coaching reshuffle at BAM in 2017, Tey was re-assigned and has since served as head coach of Malaysia's national women's singles department.

In May 2020, the BAM once again restructured their national coaching setup which saw Tey returning to the men's singles squad as assistant to head coach, Hendrawan. Another Indonesian, Indra Wijaya, succeeded Tey as women's singles head coach.

== Honours ==
- Companion Class II of the Order of Malacca (DPSM) - Datuk (2017).
