= 2001 Singapore Open (badminton) =

Tournament details
- Dates: 15 August 2001– 19 August 2001
- Edition: 52nd
- Level: World Grand Prix 4 Stars
- Total prize money: US$120,000
- Venue: Singapore Indoor Stadium
- Location: Kallang, Singapore

Champions
- Men's singles: (Indonesia) Taufik Hidayat
- Women's singles: (China) Zhang Ning
- Men's doubles: (Indonesia) Tony Gunawan (Indonesia) Halim Haryanto
- Women's doubles: (China) Wei Yili (China) Zhang Jiewen
- Mixed doubles: (Denmark) Jens Eriksen (Denmark) Mette Schjoldager

The 2001 Singapore Open (officially known as the Yonex-Sunrise Singapore Open 2001 for sponsorship reasons) was a four-star badminton tournament that took place at the Singapore Indoor Stadium in Singapore, from August 15 to August 19, 2001. The total prize money on offer was US$120,000.

== Final results ==
Category	Winners	Runners-up	Score
Men's singles	(Indonesia) Taufik Hidayat	(Malaysia) Wong Choong Hann	7–5, 0–7, 7–1, 1–7, 7–4
Women's singles	(China) Zhang Ning	(China) Dai Yun	7–1, 4–7, 7–2, 1–7, 7–0
Men's doubles	(Indonesia) Tony Gunawan & Halim Haryanto	(Indonesia) Sigit Budiarto & Candra Wijaya	5–7, 7–3, 7–2, 7–0
Women's doubles	(China) Wei Yili & Zhang Jiewen	(China) Zhang Yawen & Zhao Tingting	8–6, 7–3, 7–4
Mixed doubles	(Denmark) Jens Eriksen & Mette Schjoldager	(Denmark) Michael Søgaard & Rikke Olsen	7–2, 4–7, 7–5, 7–5
