= Badminton Association of Malaysia =

Governing body of badminton in Malaysia

- Persatuan Badminton Malaysia
- Abbreviation: BAM
- Formation: 1 November 1934; 92 years ago
- Type: Sports federation
- Headquarters: Kuala Lumpur, Malaysia
- President: Tengku Zafrul Aziz
- Deputy President: V. Subramaniam
- Website: bam.org.my

The Badminton Association of Malaysia or BAM (Malay: Persatuan Badminton Malaysia) is the governing body of badminton in Malaysia. The association was founded in 1964. Nevertheless, the history of Malaysian badminton starts much earlier. Already in 1934 an association was founded by the provinces Perak, Penang, Selangor, Johore and Singapore.

BAM is registered with the sports commissioner's office under the Sports Development Act 1997 of the laws of Malaysia. The association was founded in 1964 and has 15 states as their members.

== History of formation ==
- 1809: Badminton brought to Malaya by officers of the East India Company in Penang
- Early 1900s: Promoted by British through mission schools especially in Penang, Melaka, Ipoh, Kuala Lumpur and Singapore
- 1925: Penang becomes first state to form its own state badminton association (Penang Badminton Association)
- 1929: Perak forms its own state badminton association
- 1934: Badminton Association of Malaya officially formed on 11 November, J.L. Woods of Perak becomes first President of BAM
- 1964: Badminton Association of Malaysia is formed

== Tournaments ==
- Malaysia Open
- Malaysia Masters
- Malaysia International
- Malaysia International Junior Challenge
- Malaysian National Badminton Championships
- PROTON National Circuit Kuala Lumpur Open

== Controversy ==
=== Use of tournament bans on players who resigned from BAM ===
Badminton Association of Malaysia, as the national association, is the sole authority to register Malaysian players into Badminton World Federation-sanctioned tournaments, of which made up majority of the international badminton tournaments. On several occasions, BAM had refused to register players who have had left their fold.

In 2011, Tan Chun Seang was banned from Asian tournaments for two years after walking out from the national team. In 2019, Toh Ee Wei left BAM after a fallout with the association, and was barred from international tournaments as an independent player. Toh had since returned to BAM in 2020.

In September 2021, Goh Jin Wei resigned from the national team, citing health issues and explained that she "could never be able to fulfil the requirements and conditions of the national team". Goh instead signed as an independent player with Kuala Lumpur Racquet Club on 6 January 2022. On 19 January 2022, Lee Zii Jia decided to quit the team as he felt that he couldn't withstand the pressure to be on the national team. In response, BAM sanctioned both Lee and Goh by banning both players for participating in any international events for 2 years. BAM deputy president Jahaberdeen Mohamed Yunoos said that the decision was made "to safeguard BAM's integrity as a national institution and custodian of the sport's national interest". The decision has caused anger among national and international fans, denouncing BAM decision. Danish badminton player and Olympic champion Viktor Axelsen condemn the sanctions as "crazy" and expressed solidarity with Lee and Goh. The same condemnation also expressed by other international badminton players like Anders Antonsen, Hans-Kristian Vittinghus, and Gronya Somerville. Supporters of the decision argued that Lee's premature exit from the national team may trigger other players to do same, and potentially losing sponsorship income for BAM. After a meeting between BAM and Lee on 25 January 2022, an agreement was reached with the ban to be lifted with terms yet to be disclosed.

== List of presidents ==
- 1934–1937 : John L. Woods
- 1947–1949 : Lim Chuan Geok
- 1949 : Heah Joo Seang
- 1950–1953 : Khoo Teik Ee
- 1954–1959 : Heah Joo Seang
- 1960 : Low Hoot Yeang
- 1961–1985 : Khir Johari
- 1985–1993 : Elyas Omar
- 1993–2000 : Abdullah Fadzil Che Wan
- 2000–2013 : Mohd Nadzmi Mohd Salleh
- 2013–2017 : Tengku Mahaleel Tengku Ariff
- 2015–2017 : Mohd Al-Amin Abdul Majid (Acting)
- 2017–2024 : Mohamad Norza Zakaria
- 2024–2025 : V. Subramaniam (Acting)
- 2025–present : Tengku Zafrul Aziz

== See also ==
- List of Malaysian medalists in badminton
