= List of Malaysian medalists in badminton =

This is a list of medalists who represented Malaysia and her predecessor states at multi-sport and major events of badminton.

Men's player
Women's player

== Medal leaders ==
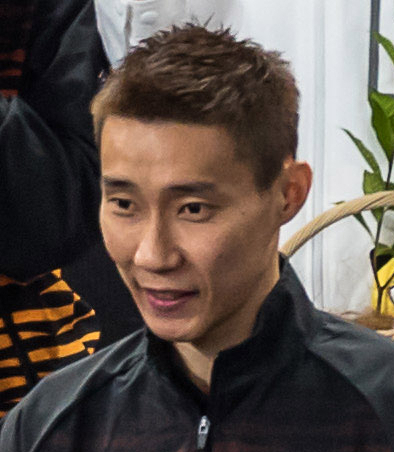
Lee (above) and Cheah Soon Kit are Malaysia's all-time leader in medals won with 46 throughout their senior international careers respectively (2000–2019, 1986–2000).

| Rank | Shuttler | Category | Accolades | | Total |
|---|---|---|---|---|---|
| 1 | Cheah Soon Kit | Men's doubles • Mixed doubles | Olympic Games | (silver) (1996) | 46 |
| 1 | Cheah Soon Kit | Men's doubles • Mixed doubles | Asian Games | (silver) (1990 – Men's team) (silver) (1994) (bronze) (1994 – Men's team) | 46 |
| 1 | Cheah Soon Kit | Men's doubles • Mixed doubles | Commonwealth Games | (gold) (1994) (gold) (1998 – Men's team) (silver) (1990) (silver) (1994 – Mixed team) (silver) (1998) | 46 |
| 1 | Cheah Soon Kit | Men's doubles • Mixed doubles | Southeast Asian Games | (gold) (1989 – Men's team) (gold) (1991 – Men's team) (gold) (1993) (gold) (1995) (silver) (1987 – Men's team) (silver) (1993 – Men's team) (silver) (1995 – Men's team) (silver) (1997 – Men's team) (bronze) (1989) (bronze) (1991) | 46 |
| 1 | Cheah Soon Kit | Men's doubles • Mixed doubles | Thomas Cup | (gold) (1992) (silver) (1988) (silver) (1990) (silver) (1994) (silver) (1998) (bronze) (1986) | 46 |
| 1 | Cheah Soon Kit | Men's doubles • Mixed doubles | World Championships | (silver) (1993) (silver) (1997) (bronze) (1995) | 46 |
| 1 | Cheah Soon Kit | Men's doubles • Mixed doubles | World Cup | (gold) (1992) (gold) (1994) (bronze) (1993) (bronze) (1995) (bronze) (1996) | 46 |
| 1 | Cheah Soon Kit | Men's doubles • Mixed doubles | Asian Championships | (gold) (1995) (bronze) (1989 – Men's team) (bronze) (1991) (bronze) (1999) | 46 |
| 1 | Cheah Soon Kit | Men's doubles • Mixed doubles | Asian Cup | (gold) (1991) (silver) (1994) (silver) (1995) | 46 |
| 1 | Cheah Soon Kit | Men's doubles • Mixed doubles | IBF Grand Prix Finals | (gold) (1995) (silver) (1990) (silver) (1992) (silver) (1996) (silver) (1997) | 46 |
| 1 | Cheah Soon Kit | Men's doubles • Mixed doubles | All England Open | (silver) (1996) | 46 |
| 1 | Lee Chong Wei | Men's singles | Olympic Games | (silver) (2008) (silver) (2012) (silver) (2016) | 46 |
| 1 | Lee Chong Wei | Men's singles | Asian Games | (silver) (2010) (bronze) (2006) (bronze) (2006 – Men's team) (bronze) (2014) (bronze) (2014 – Men's team) | 46 |
| 1 | Lee Chong Wei | Men's singles | Commonwealth Games | (gold) (2006) (gold) (2006 – Mixed team) (gold) (2010) (gold) (2010 – Mixed team) (gold) (2018) (silver) (2018 – Mixed team) | 46 |
| 1 | Lee Chong Wei | Men's singles | Southeast Asian Games | (gold) (2005 – Men's team) (bronze) (2003 – Men's team) (bronze) (2005) (bronze) (2015 – Men's team) | 46 |
| 1 | Lee Chong Wei | Men's singles | Thomas Cup | (silver) (2014) (bronze) (2006) (bronze) (2008) (bronze) (2010) (bronze) (2016) | 46 |
| 1 | Lee Chong Wei | Men's singles | Sudirman Cup | (bronze) (2009) | 46 |
| 1 | Lee Chong Wei | Men's singles | Asia Team Championships | (bronze) (2018) | 46 |
| 1 | Lee Chong Wei | Men's singles | World Championships | (silver) (2011) (silver) (2013) (silver) (2014) (Note: Lee Chong Wei's third silver medal which he won from the 2014 edition was stripped from him due to his anti-doping rule violation.) (silver) (2015) (bronze) (2005) | 46 |
| 1 | Lee Chong Wei | Men's singles | Asia Championships | (gold) (2006) (gold) (2016) (bronze) (2017) (bronze) (2018) | 46 |
| 1 | Lee Chong Wei | Men's singles | BWF Super Series Finals | (gold) (2008) (gold) (2009) (gold) (2010) (gold) (2013) (silver) (2017) | 46 |
| 1 | Lee Chong Wei | Men's singles | All England Open | (gold) (2010) (gold) (2011) (gold) (2014) (gold) (2017) (silver) (2009) (silver) (2012) (silver) (2013) | 46 |
| 3 | Razif Sidek | Men's singles • Men's doubles • Mixed doubles | Olympic Games | (bronze) (1992) | 44 |
| 3 | Razif Sidek | Men's singles • Men's doubles • Mixed doubles | Asian Games | (silver) (1990 – Men's team) (bronze) (1990) | 44 |
| 3 | Razif Sidek | Men's singles • Men's doubles • Mixed doubles | Commonwealth Games | (gold) (1982) (gold) (1990) (bronze) (1982) | 44 |
| 3 | Razif Sidek | Men's singles • Men's doubles • Mixed doubles | Southeast Asian Games | (gold) (1985) (gold) (1989 – Men's team) (gold) (1991 – Men's team) (silver) (1981) (silver) (1981 – Men's team) (silver) (1983 – Men's team) (silver) (1985 – Men's team) (silver) (1989) (silver) (1991) (bronze) (1981) (bronze) (1983) (bronze) (1985) | 44 |
| 3 | Razif Sidek | Men's singles • Men's doubles • Mixed doubles | Thomas Cup | (gold) (1992) (silver) (1988) (silver) (1990) (silver) (1994) (bronze) (1986) | 44 |
| 3 | Razif Sidek | Men's singles • Men's doubles • Mixed doubles | World Championships | (silver) (1987) (bronze) (1989) | 44 |
| 3 | Razif Sidek | Men's singles • Men's doubles • Mixed doubles | World Cup | (gold) (1990) (gold) (1991) (silver) (1988) (bronze) (1983) (bronze) (1984) (bronze) (1985) (bronze) (1987) | 44 |
| 3 | Razif Sidek | Men's singles • Men's doubles • Mixed doubles | Asian Championships | (gold) (1992) (silver) (1985) (silver) (1985 – Men's team) (bronze) (1989 – Men's team) (bronze) (1994) | 44 |
| 3 | Razif Sidek | Men's singles • Men's doubles • Mixed doubles | IBF Grand Prix Finals | (gold) (1986) (gold) (1988) (gold) (1989) (gold) (1991) | 44 |
| 3 | Razif Sidek | Men's singles • Men's doubles • Mixed doubles | All England Open | (gold) (1982) (silver) (1986) (silver) (1988) | 44 |

== Multi-sport events ==
=== Historic ===
==== Olympic Games ====
| Medalists | State / Federal Territory | Singles | | | Doubles | | | Mixed Doubles | | | Total | | | |
| Medalists | State / Federal Territory | Gold | Silver | Bronze | Gold | Silver | Bronze | Gold | Silver | Bronze | Gold | Silver | Bronze | |
|---|---|---|---|---|---|---|---|---|---|---|---|---|---|---|
| Lee, Chong Wei | Perak/Penang | 0 | 3 | 0 | 0 | 0 | 0 | 0 | 0 | 0 | 0 | 3 | 0 | 3 |
| Chan, Peng Soon | Penang | 0 | 0 | 0 | 0 | 0 | 0 | 0 | 1 | 0 | 0 | 1 | 0 | 1 |
| Cheah, Soon Kit | Perak | 0 | 0 | 0 | 0 | 1 | 0 | 0 | 0 | 0 | 0 | 1 | 0 | 1 |
| Goh, Liu Ying | Malacca | 0 | 0 | 0 | 0 | 0 | 0 | 0 | 1 | 0 | 0 | 1 | 0 | 1 |
| Goh, V Shem | Kuala Lumpur | 0 | 0 | 0 | 0 | 1 | 0 | 0 | 0 | 0 | 0 | 1 | 0 | 1 |
| Gunalan, Punch | Selangor | 0 | 0 | 0 | 0 | 1 | 0 | 0 | 0 | 0 | 0 | 1 (Note: Ng Boon Bee and Punch Gunalan won the silver medal in men's doubles at the 1972 Summer Olympics during which badminton was played as a demonstration sport.) | 0 | 1 |
| Ng, Boon Bee | Perak | 0 | 0 | 0 | 0 | 1 | 0 | 0 | 0 | 0 | 0 | 1 | 0 | 1 |
| Tan, Wee Kiong | Johor/Sabah | 0 | 0 | 0 | 0 | 1 | 0 | 0 | 0 | 0 | 0 | 1 | 0 | 1 |
| Yap, Kim Hock | Johor | 0 | 0 | 0 | 0 | 1 | 0 | 0 | 0 | 0 | 0 | 1 | 0 | 1 |
| Chia, Teng Fong Aaron | Malacca | 0 | 0 | 0 | 0 | 0 | 2 | 0 | 0 | 0 | 0 | 0 | 2 | 2 |
| Soh, Wooi Yik | Kuala Lumpur | 0 | 0 | 0 | 0 | 0 | 2 | 0 | 0 | 0 | 0 | 0 | 2 | 2 |
| Jalani Bin Mohamad Sidek | Selangor | 0 | 0 | 0 | 0 | 0 | 1 | 0 | 0 | 0 | 0 | 0 | 1 | 1 |
| Lee, Zii Jia | Kedah | 0 | 0 | 1 | 0 | 0 | 0 | 0 | 0 | 0 | 0 | 0 | 1 | 1 |
| Rashid Bin Mohamad Sidek | Selangor | 0 | 0 | 1 | 0 | 0 | 0 | 0 | 0 | 0 | 0 | 0 | 1 | 1 |
| Razif Bin Mohamad Sidek | Selangor | 0 | 0 | 0 | 0 | 0 | 1 | 0 | 0 | 0 | 0 | 0 | 1 | 1 |

==== Commonwealth Games ====
| Medalists | State / Federal Territory | Singles | | | Doubles | | | Mixed Doubles | | | Mixed Team (Note: Although badminton has been a fixture in the Commonwealth Games since 1966, the mixed team event was only contested beginning from the 1978 Commonwealth Games. In the 1998 edition, men's and women's team events were played in place of the usual mixed team event.) | | | Total | | | |
| Medalists | State / Federal Territory | Gold | Silver | Bronze | Gold | Silver | Bronze | Gold | Silver | Bronze | Gold | Silver | Bronze | Gold | Silver | Bronze | |
|---|---|---|---|---|---|---|---|---|---|---|---|---|---|---|---|---|---|
| Lee, Chong Wei | Perak/Penang | 3 | 0 | 0 | 0 | 0 | 0 | 0 | 0 | 0 | 2 | 1 | 0 | 5 | 1 | 0 | 6 |
| Koo, Kien Keat | Perak | 0 | 0 | 0 | 2 | 0 | 0 | 1 | 0 | 0 | 2 | 0 | 0 | 5 | 0 | 0 | 5 |
| Chin, Eei Hui | Penang | 0 | 0 | 0 | 1 | 0 | 1 | 1 | 1 | 0 | 2 | 0 | 0 | 4 | 1 | 1 | 6 |
| Wong, Choong Hann | Kuala Lumpur | 1 | 1 | 1 | 0 | 1 | 0 | 0 | 0 | 0 | 2 | 0 | 0 | 3 | 2 | 1 | 6 |
| Choong, Tan Fook | Perak | 0 | 0 | 0 | 1 | 2 | 0 | 0 | 0 | 0 | 2 | 0 | 0 | 3 | 2 | 0 | 5 |
| Chan, Peng Soon | Penang | 0 | 0 | 0 | 0 | 0 | 0 | 0 | 0 | 1 | 3 | 1 | 0 | 3 | 1 | 1 | 5 |
| Hoo, Kah Mun Vivian | Kuala Lumpur | 0 | 0 | 0 | 2 | 0 | 0 | 0 | 0 | 0 | 1 | 1 | 0 | 3 | 1 | 0 | 4 |
| Chan, Chong Ming | Selangor | 0 | 0 | 0 | 2 | 0 | 0 | 0 | 0 | 0 | 1 | 0 | 0 | 3 | 0 | 0 | 3 |
| Woon, Khe Wei Janice | Selangor | 0 | 0 | 0 | 1 | 0 | 0 | 0 | 0 | 0 | 2 | 0 | 0 | 3 | 0 | 0 | 3 |
| Cheah, Soon Kit | Perak | 0 | 0 | 0 | 1 | 2 | 0 | 0 | 0 | 0 | 1 | 1 | 0 | 2 | 3 | 0 | 5 |
| Rashid Bin Mohamad Sidek | Selangor | 2 | 0 | 0 | 0 | 1 | 0 | 0 | 0 | 0 | 0 | 1 | 0 | 2 | 2 | 0 | 4 |
| Wong, Mew Choo | Perak | 0 | 2 | 0 | 0 | 0 | 0 | 0 | 0 | 0 | 2 | 0 | 0 | 2 | 2 | 0 | 4 |
| Goh, V Shem | Kuala Lumpur | 0 | 0 | 0 | 1 | 0 | 1 | 0 | 0 | 0 | 1 | 1 | 0 | 2 | 1 | 1 | 4 |
| Tan, Wee Kiong | Johor/Sabah | 0 | 0 | 0 | 1 | 0 | 1 | 0 | 0 | 0 | 1 | 1 | 0 | 2 | 1 | 1 | 4 |
| Gunalan, Punch | Selangor | 1 | 0 | 0 | 1 | 0 | 1 | 0 | 0 | 0 | N/A | | | 2 | 0 | 1 | 3 |
| Lai, Pei Jing | Pahang | 0 | 0 | 0 | 0 | 0 | 0 | 0 | 0 | 1 | 2 | 0 | 0 | 2 | 0 | 1 | 3 |
| Razif Bin Mohamad Sidek | Selangor | 0 | 0 | 1 | 2 | 0 | 0 | 0 | 0 | 0 | 0 | 0 | 0 | 2 | 0 | 1 | 3 |
| Wong, Pei Tty | Perak | 0 | 0 | 0 | 1 | 0 | 1 | 0 | 0 | 0 | 1 | 0 | 0 | 2 | 0 | 1 | 3 |
| Hafiz Bin Hashim, Muhammad | Kelantan | 1 | 0 | 0 | 0 | 0 | 0 | 0 | 0 | 0 | 1 | 0 | 0 | 2 | 0 | 0 | 2 |
| Lee, Wan Wah | Perak | 0 | 0 | 0 | 1 | 0 | 0 | 0 | 0 | 0 | 1 | 0 | 0 | 2 | 0 | 0 | 2 |
| Muralitharan, Thinaah | Selangor | 0 | 0 | 0 | 1 | 0 | 0 | 0 | 0 | 0 | 1 | 0 | 0 | 2 | 0 | 0 | 2 |
| Tan, Aik Huang | Penang | 1 | 0 | 0 | 1 | 0 | 0 | 0 | 0 | 0 | N/A | | | 2 | 0 | 0 | 2 |
| Tan, Boon Heong | Kedah | 0 | 0 | 0 | 1 | 0 | 0 | 0 | 0 | 0 | 1 | 0 | 0 | 2 | 0 | 0 | 2 |
| Tan, Koong Le Pearly | Kedah | 0 | 0 | 0 | 1 | 0 | 0 | 0 | 0 | 0 | 1 | 0 | 0 | 2 | 0 | 0 | 2 |
| Ong, Ewe Hock | Penang | 0 | 1 | 0 | 0 | 0 | 1 | 0 | 0 | 0 | 1 | 1 | 0 | 1 | 2 | 1 | 4 |
| Lim, Pek Siah | | 0 | 0 | 0 | 1 | 1 | 0 | 0 | 0 | 0 | 0 | 1 | 0 | 1 | 2 | 0 | 3 |
| Goh, Liu Ying | Malacca | 0 | 0 | 0 | 0 | 0 | 0 | 0 | 0 | 1 | 1 | 1 | 0 | 1 | 1 | 1 | 3 |
| Chew, Choon Eng | Penang | 0 | 0 | 0 | 1 | 0 | 0 | 0 | 1 | 0 | 0 | 0 | 0 | 1 | 1 | 0 | 2 |
| Chow, Mei Kuan | Kuala Lumpur | 0 | 0 | 0 | 1 | 0 | 0 | 0 | 0 | 0 | 0 | 1 | 0 | 1 | 1 | 0 | 2 |
| Ng, Boon Bee | Perak | 0 | 0 | 0 | 1 | 1 | 0 | 0 | 0 | 0 | N/A | | | 1 | 1 | 0 | 2 |
| Ng, Tze Yong | Johor | 0 | 1 | 0 | 0 | 0 | 0 | 0 | 0 | 0 | 1 | 0 | 0 | 1 | 1 | 0 | 2 |
| Soo, Beng Kiang | Kedah | 0 | 0 | 0 | 1 | 0 | 0 | 0 | 0 | 0 | 0 | 1 | 0 | 1 | 1 | 0 | 2 |
| Yap, Kim Hock | Johor | 0 | 0 | 0 | 0 | 1 | 0 | 0 | 0 | 0 | 1 | 0 | 0 | 1 | 1 | 0 | 2 |
| Yew, Cheng Hoe | Selangor | 0 | 1 | 0 | 1 | 0 | 0 | 0 | 0 | 0 | N/A | | | 1 | 1 | 0 | 2 |
| Yong, Hock Kin | Negeri Sembilan | 0 | 1 | 0 | 0 | 0 | 0 | 0 | 0 | 0 | 1 | 0 | 0 | 1 | 1 | 0 | 2 |
| Ng, Meow Eng Sylvia | Johor | 1 | 0 | 2 | 0 | 0 | 0 | 0 | 0 | 0 | 0 | 0 | 0 | 1 | 0 | 2 | 3 |
| Tan, Kian Meng | Johor | 0 | 0 | 0 | 0 | 0 | 0 | 0 | 0 | 1 | 1 | 0 | 0 | 1 | 0 | 1 | 2 |
| Ang, Li Peng | Selangor | 0 | 0 | 0 | 1 | 0 | 0 | 0 | 0 | 0 | 0 | 0 | 0 | 1 | 0 | 0 | 1 |
| Cheah, Li Ya Lyddia | Kuala Lumpur | 0 | 0 | 0 | 0 | 0 | 0 | 0 | 0 | 0 | 1 | 0 | 0 | 1 | 0 | 0 | 1 |
| Cheah, Yee See | Penang | 0 | 0 | 0 | 0 | 0 | 0 | 0 | 0 | 0 | 1 | 0 | 0 | 1 | 0 | 0 | 1 |
| Chia, Teng Fong Aaron | Malacca | 0 | 0 | 0 | 0 | 0 | 0 | 0 | 0 | 0 | 1 | 0 | 0 | 1 | 0 | 0 | 1 |
| Chong, Wei Feng | Kedah | 0 | 0 | 0 | 0 | 0 | 0 | 0 | 0 | 0 | 1 | 0 | 0 | 1 | 0 | 0 | 1 |
| Goh, Jin Wei | Penang | 0 | 0 | 0 | 0 | 0 | 0 | 0 | 0 | 0 | 1 | 0 | 0 | 1 | 0 | 0 | 1 |
| Jalani Bin Mohamad Sidek | Selangor | 0 | 0 | 0 | 1 | 0 | 0 | 0 | 0 | 0 | 0 | 0 | 0 | 1 | 0 | 0 | 1 |
| Liew, Daren | Kuala Lumpur | 0 | 0 | 0 | 0 | 0 | 0 | 0 | 0 | 0 | 1 | 0 | 0 | 1 | 0 | 0 | 1 |
| Lim, Yin Loo | Negeri Sembilan | 0 | 0 | 0 | 0 | 0 | 0 | 0 | 0 | 0 | 1 | 0 | 0 | 1 | 0 | 0 | 1 |
| Ong, Beng Teong | Selangor | 0 | 0 | 0 | 1 | 0 | 0 | 0 | 0 | 0 | 0 | 0 | 0 | 1 | 0 | 0 | 1 |
| Ooi, Sock Ai | | 0 | 0 | 0 | 0 | 0 | 0 | 0 | 0 | 0 | 1 | 0 | 0 | 1 | 0 | 0 | 1 |
| Soh, Wooi Yik | Kuala Lumpur | 0 | 0 | 0 | 0 | 0 | 0 | 0 | 0 | 0 | 1 | 0 | 0 | 1 | 0 | 0 | 1 |
| Tee, Jing Yi | Penang | 0 | 0 | 0 | 0 | 0 | 0 | 0 | 0 | 0 | 1 | 0 | 0 | 1 | 0 | 0 | 1 |
| Wong, Pei Xian Julia | Malacca | 0 | 0 | 0 | 0 | 0 | 0 | 0 | 0 | 0 | 1 | 0 | 0 | 1 | 0 | 0 | 1 |
| Chor, Hooi Yee | | 0 | 0 | 0 | 0 | 1 | 0 | 0 | 0 | 0 | 0 | 1 | 0 | 0 | 2 | 0 | 2 |
| Lee, Wai Leng | | 0 | 0 | 0 | 0 | 0 | 1 | 0 | 0 | 0 | 0 | 1 | 0 | 0 | 1 | 1 | 2 |
| Moo, Foot Lian | Selangor | 0 | 0 | 0 | 0 | 1 | 0 | 0 | 0 | 0 | 0 | 0 | 1 | 0 | 1 | 1 | 2 |
| Ng, Mee Fen Stephanie | | 0 | 0 | 1 | 0 | 0 | 0 | 0 | 0 | 0 | 0 | 1 | 0 | 0 | 1 | 1 | 2 |
| Ong, Teong Boon | | 0 | 0 | 0 | 0 | 1 | 0 | 0 | 0 | 0 | 0 | 0 | 1 | 0 | 1 | 1 | 2 |
| Tan, Kim Her | | 0 | 0 | 0 | 0 | 0 | 1 | 0 | 0 | 0 | 0 | 1 | 0 | 0 | 1 | 1 | 2 |
| Tan, Lee Wai | | 0 | 0 | 0 | 0 | 0 | 1 | 0 | 0 | 0 | 0 | 1 | 0 | 0 | 1 | 1 | 2 |
| Teh, Swee Phek Katherine | | 0 | 1 | 0 | 0 | 0 | 0 | 0 | 0 | 0 | 0 | 0 | 1 | 0 | 1 | 1 | 2 |
| Chang, Kim Wai | Perak | 0 | 0 | 0 | 0 | 1 | 0 | 0 | 0 | 0 | 0 | 0 | 0 | 0 | 1 | 0 | 1 |
| Cheah, Su Ya Soniia | Kuala Lumpur | 0 | 0 | 0 | 0 | 0 | 0 | 0 | 0 | 0 | 0 | 1 | 0 | 0 | 1 | 0 | 1 |
| Foo, Kok Keong | Selangor | 0 | 1 | 0 | 0 | 0 | 0 | 0 | 0 | 0 | 0 | 0 | 0 | 0 | 1 | 0 | 1 |
| Goh, Soon Huat | Malacca | 0 | 0 | 0 | 0 | 0 | 0 | 0 | 0 | 0 | 0 | 1 | 0 | 0 | 1 | 0 | 1 |
| Kuak, Seok Choon | | 0 | 0 | 0 | 0 | 0 | 0 | 0 | 0 | 0 | 0 | 1 | 0 | 0 | 1 | 0 | 1 |
| Lai, Shevon Jemie | Selangor | 0 | 0 | 0 | 0 | 0 | 0 | 0 | 0 | 0 | 0 | 1 | 0 | 0 | 1 | 0 | 1 |
| Law, Pei Pei | | 0 | 0 | 0 | 0 | 0 | 0 | 0 | 0 | 0 | 0 | 1 | 0 | 0 | 1 | 0 | 1 |
| Lee, Tsuen Seng | Perak | 0 | 1 | 0 | 0 | 0 | 0 | 0 | 0 | 0 | 0 | 0 | 0 | 0 | 1 | 0 | 1 |
| Leong, Yeng Cheng | | 0 | 0 | 0 | 0 | 0 | 0 | 0 | 0 | 0 | 0 | 1 | 0 | 0 | 1 | 0 | 1 |
| Ng, Tat Wai | Penang | 0 | 0 | 0 | 0 | 1 | 0 | 0 | 0 | 0 | N/A | | | 0 | 1 | 0 | 1 |
| Norhasikin Binti Amin | | 0 | 0 | 0 | 0 | 0 | 0 | 0 | 0 | 0 | 0 | 1 | 0 | 0 | 1 | 0 | 1 |
| Quay, Swee Ling Joanne | | 0 | 0 | 0 | 0 | 0 | 0 | 0 | 0 | 0 | 0 | 1 | 0 | 0 | 1 | 0 | 1 |
| Tan, Soon Hooi | | 0 | 0 | 0 | 0 | 1 | 0 | 0 | 0 | 0 | N/A | | | 0 | 1 | 0 | 1 |
| Tan, Yee Khan | Perak | 0 | 0 | 0 | 0 | 1 | 0 | 0 | 0 | 0 | N/A | | | 0 | 1 | 0 | 1 |
| Woon, Sze Mei | | 0 | 0 | 0 | 0 | 0 | 0 | 0 | 0 | 0 | 0 | 1 | 0 | 0 | 1 | 0 | 1 |
| Zamaliah Binti Mohamad Sidek | Selangor | 0 | 0 | 0 | 0 | 0 | 0 | 0 | 0 | 0 | 0 | 1 | 0 | 0 | 1 | 0 | 1 |
| Ang, Rosalind Singha | Kedah | 0 | 0 | 0 | 0 | 0 | 3 | 0 | 0 | 0 | 0 | 0 | 1 | 0 | 0 | 4 | 4 |
| Teoh, Siew Yong | Kedah | 0 | 0 | 0 | 0 | 0 | 3 | 0 | 0 | 0 | N/A | | | 0 | 0 | 3 | 3 |
| Abu Bakar Bin Sufian | Perak | 0 | 0 | 0 | 0 | 0 | 0 | 0 | 0 | 0 | 0 | 0 | 1 | 0 | 0 | 1 | 1 |
| Saw, Swee Leong | Penang | 0 | 0 | 0 | 0 | 0 | 0 | 0 | 0 | 0 | 0 | 0 | 1 | 0 | 0 | 1 | 1 |
| Selvaraj Joseph, James | Selangor | 0 | 0 | 0 | 0 | 0 | 0 | 0 | 0 | 0 | 0 | 0 | 1 | 0 | 0 | 1 | 1 |
| Soong, Chok Soon Dominic | Perak | 0 | 0 | 0 | 0 | 0 | 1 | 0 | 0 | 0 | N/A | | | 0 | 0 | 1 | 1 |

=== Regional ===
==== Asian Games ====
| Medalists | State / Federal Territory | Singles | | | Doubles | | | Mixed Doubles | | | Men's / Women's Team | | | Total | | | |
| Medalists | State / Federal Territory | Gold | Silver | Bronze | Gold | Silver | Bronze | Gold | Silver | Bronze | Gold | Silver | Bronze | Gold | Silver | Bronze | |
|---|---|---|---|---|---|---|---|---|---|---|---|---|---|---|---|---|---|
| Ng, Boon Bee | Perak | 0 | 0 | 0 | 3 | 0 | 0 | 1 | 0 | 0 | 0 | 1 | 2 | 4 | 1 | 2 | 7 |
| Tan, Yee Khan | Perak | 0 | 0 | 0 | 2 | 0 | 0 | 0 | 0 | 0 | 0 | 1 | 1 | 2 | 1 | 1 | 4 |
| Gunalan, Punch | Selangor | 1 | 0 | 0 | 1 | 0 | 0 | 0 | 0 | 0 | 0 | 0 | 1 | 2 | 0 | 1 | 3 |
| Teh, Kew San | Penang | 0 | 1 | 0 | 0 | 1 | 0 | 1 | 0 | 0 | 0 | 1 | 1 | 1 | 2 | 1 | 4 |
| Tan, Boon Heong | Kedah | 0 | 0 | 0 | 1 | 1 | 0 | 0 | 0 | 0 | 0 | 0 | 2 | 1 | 1 | 2 | 4 |
| Koo, Kien Keat | Perak | 0 | 0 | 0 | 1 | 1 | 0 | 0 | 0 | 0 | 0 | 0 | 1 | 1 | 1 | 1 | 3 |
| Ang, Rosalind Singha | Kedah | 0 | 0 | 0 | 0 | 0 | 1 | 1 | 0 | 0 | 0 | 0 | 0 | 1 | 0 | 1 | 2 |
| Ng, Meow Eng Silvia | Johor | 0 | 0 | 1 | 0 | 0 | 0 | 1 | 0 | 0 | 0 | 0 | 0 | 1 | 0 | 1 | 2 |
| Cheah, Soon Kit | Perak | 0 | 0 | 0 | 0 | 1 | 0 | 0 | 0 | 0 | 0 | 1 | 1 | 0 | 2 | 1 | 3 |
| Khaw née Tan, Gaik Bee | Penang | 0 | 0 | 0 | 0 | 0 | 1 | 0 | 1 | 0 | 0 | 1 | 0 | 0 | 2 | 1 | 3 |
| Soo, Beng Kiang | Kedah | 0 | 0 | 0 | 0 | 1 | 0 | 0 | 0 | 0 | 0 | 1 | 1 | 0 | 2 | 1 | 3 |
| Choong, Ewe Beng "Eddy" | Penang | 0 | 0 | 0 | 0 | 0 | 0 | 0 | 1 | 0 | 0 | 1 | 0 | 0 | 2 | 0 | 2 |
| Lee, Chong Wei | Perak/Penang | 0 | 1 | 2 | 0 | 0 | 0 | 0 | 0 | 0 | 0 | 0 | 2 | 0 | 1 | 4 | 5 |
| Jalani Bin Mohamad Sidek | Selangor | 0 | 0 | 0 | 0 | 0 | 1 | 0 | 0 | 0 | 0 | 1 | 0 | 0 | 1 | 1 | 2 |
| Teh née Ng, Mei Ling | Penang | 0 | 0 | 0 | 0 | 0 | 1 | 0 | 0 | 0 | 0 | 1 | 0 | 0 | 1 | 1 | 2 |
| Ng, Seow Meng Billy | Johor | 0 | 0 | 0 | 0 | 0 | 0 | 0 | 0 | 0 | 0 | 1 | 1 | 0 | 1 | 1 | 2 |
| Rashid Bin Mohamad Sidek | Selangor | 0 | 0 | 1 | 0 | 0 | 0 | 0 | 0 | 0 | 0 | 1 | 0 | 0 | 1 | 1 | 2 |
| Razif Bin Mohamad Sidek | Selangor | 0 | 0 | 0 | 0 | 0 | 1 | 0 | 0 | 0 | 0 | 1 | 0 | 0 | 1 | 1 | 2 |
| Yew, Cheng Hoe | Selangor | 0 | 0 | 0 | 0 | 0 | 0 | 0 | 0 | 0 | 0 | 1 | 1 | 0 | 1 | 1 | 2 |
| Foo, Kok Keong | Selangor | 0 | 0 | 0 | 0 | 0 | 0 | 0 | 0 | 0 | 0 | 1 | 0 | 0 | 1 | 0 | 1 |
| Keong, Sneo Cha Annie | | 0 | 0 | 0 | 0 | 0 | 0 | 0 | 0 | 0 | 0 | 1 | 0 | 0 | 1 | 0 | 1 |
| Khor, Cheng Chye | Selangor | 0 | 0 | 0 | 0 | 0 | 0 | 0 | 0 | 0 | 0 | 1 | 0 | 0 | 1 | 0 | 1 |
| Kok, Lee Ying | Selangor | 0 | 0 | 0 | 0 | 0 | 0 | 0 | 0 | 0 | 0 | 1 | 0 | 0 | 1 | 0 | 1 |
| Kwan, Yoke Meng | Selangor | 0 | 0 | 0 | 0 | 0 | 0 | 0 | 0 | 0 | 0 | 1 | 0 | 0 | 1 | 0 | 1 |
| Moey, Sam Kooi Jean | Selangor | 0 | 0 | 0 | 0 | 0 | 0 | 0 | 0 | 0 | 0 | 1 | 0 | 0 | 1 | 0 | 1 |
| Chan, Chong Ming | Selangor | 0 | 0 | 0 | 0 | 0 | 1 | 0 | 0 | 0 | 0 | 0 | 2 | 0 | 0 | 3 | 3 |
| Wong, Choong Hann | Kuala Lumpur | 0 | 0 | 0 | 0 | 0 | 0 | 0 | 0 | 0 | 0 | 0 | 3 | 0 | 0 | 3 | 3 |
| Chew, Choon Eng | Penang | 0 | 0 | 0 | 0 | 0 | 1 | 0 | 0 | 0 | 0 | 0 | 1 | 0 | 0 | 2 | 2 |
| Chua, Kie How James | Sarawak | 0 | 0 | 0 | 0 | 0 | 0 | 0 | 0 | 0 | 0 | 0 | 2 | 0 | 0 | 2 | 2 |
| Fairuzizuan Bin Mohamad Tazari, Mohamad | Perak | 0 | 0 | 0 | 0 | 0 | 0 | 0 | 0 | 1 | 0 | 0 | 1 | 0 | 0 | 2 | 2 |
| Goh, V Shem | Kuala Lumpur | 0 | 0 | 0 | 0 | 0 | 1 | 0 | 0 | 0 | 0 | 0 | 1 | 0 | 0 | 2 | 2 |
| Hafiz Bin Hashim, Muhammad | Kelantan | 0 | 0 | 0 | 0 | 0 | 0 | 0 | 0 | 0 | 0 | 0 | 2 | 0 | 0 | 2 | 2 |
| Ong, Ewe Hock | Penang | 0 | 0 | 0 | 0 | 0 | 0 | 0 | 0 | 0 | 0 | 0 | 2 | 0 | 0 | 2 | 2 |
| Tan, Wee Kiong | Johor/Sabah | 0 | 0 | 0 | 0 | 0 | 1 | 0 | 0 | 0 | 0 | 0 | 1 | 0 | 0 | 2 | 2 |
| Yap, Kim Hock | Johor | 0 | 0 | 0 | 0 | 0 | 0 | 0 | 0 | 1 | 0 | 0 | 1 | 0 | 0 | 2 | 2 |
| Yong, Hock Kin | Negeri Sembilan | 0 | 0 | 1 | 0 | 0 | 0 | 0 | 0 | 0 | 0 | 0 | 1 | 0 | 0 | 2 | 2 |
| Chan, Peng Soon | Penang | 0 | 0 | 0 | 0 | 0 | 0 | 0 | 0 | 0 | 0 | 0 | 1 | 0 | 0 | 1 | 1 |
| Chang, Kim Wai | Perak | 0 | 0 | 0 | 0 | 0 | 0 | 0 | 0 | 0 | 0 | 0 | 1 | 0 | 0 | 1 | 1 |
| Cheah, Soon Thoe | | 0 | 0 | 0 | 0 | 0 | 0 | 0 | 0 | 0 | 0 | 0 | 1 | 0 | 0 | 1 | 1 |
| Chong, Wei Feng | Kedah | 0 | 0 | 0 | 0 | 0 | 0 | 0 | 0 | 0 | 0 | 0 | 1 | 0 | 0 | 1 | 1 |
| Choong, Tan Fook | Perak | 0 | 0 | 0 | 0 | 0 | 0 | 0 | 0 | 0 | 0 | 0 | 1 | 0 | 0 | 1 | 1 |
| Gan, Wye Teck Jeremy | Malacca | 0 | 0 | 0 | 0 | 0 | 0 | 0 | 0 | 0 | 0 | 0 | 1 | 0 | 0 | 1 | 1 |
| Goh, Soon Huat | Malacca | 0 | 0 | 0 | 0 | 0 | 0 | 0 | 0 | 0 | 0 | 0 | 1 | 0 | 0 | 1 | 1 |
| Hoo, Kah Mun Vivian | Kuala Lumpur | 0 | 0 | 0 | 0 | 0 | 1 | 0 | 0 | 0 | 0 | 0 | 0 | 0 | 0 | 1 | 1 |
| Hoon, Thien How | Kuala Lumpur | 0 | 0 | 0 | 0 | 0 | 0 | 0 | 0 | 0 | 0 | 0 | 1 | 0 | 0 | 1 | 1 |
| Krishnamurthy, Muralidesan | Perak | 0 | 0 | 0 | 0 | 0 | 0 | 0 | 0 | 0 | 0 | 0 | 1 | 0 | 0 | 1 | 1 |
| Kuan, Beng Hong | Kedah | 0 | 0 | 0 | 0 | 0 | 0 | 0 | 0 | 0 | 0 | 0 | 1 | 0 | 0 | 1 | 1 |
| Lee, Kok Peng | Selangor | 0 | 0 | 0 | 0 | 0 | 0 | 0 | 0 | 0 | 0 | 0 | 1 | 0 | 0 | 1 | 1 |
| Lee, Tsuen Seng | Perak | 0 | 0 | 0 | 0 | 0 | 0 | 0 | 0 | 0 | 0 | 0 | 1 | 0 | 0 | 1 | 1 |
| Lee, Wai Leng | | 0 | 0 | 0 | 0 | 0 | 0 | 0 | 0 | 1 | 0 | 0 | 0 | 0 | 0 | 1 | 1 |
| Lim, Khim Wah | Penang | 0 | 0 | 0 | 0 | 0 | 0 | 0 | 0 | 0 | 0 | 0 | 1 | 0 | 0 | 1 | 1 |
| Lin, Woon Fui Robert | Kuala Lumpur | 0 | 0 | 0 | 0 | 0 | 0 | 0 | 0 | 0 | 0 | 0 | 1 | 0 | 0 | 1 | 1 |
| Ng, Tat Wai | Penang | 0 | 0 | 0 | 0 | 0 | 0 | 0 | 0 | 0 | 0 | 0 | 1 | 0 | 0 | 1 | 1 |
| Pang, Cheh Chang | | 0 | 0 | 0 | 0 | 0 | 0 | 0 | 0 | 0 | 0 | 0 | 1 | 0 | 0 | 1 | 1 |
| Pang, Chen | | 0 | 0 | 0 | 0 | 0 | 0 | 0 | 0 | 0 | 0 | 0 | 1 | 0 | 0 | 1 | 1 |
| Rahman Bin Mohamed, Abdul | | 0 | 0 | 0 | 0 | 0 | 0 | 0 | 0 | 0 | 0 | 0 | 1 | 0 | 0 | 1 | 1 |
| Roslin Bin Hashim, Muhammad | Kelantan | 0 | 0 | 0 | 0 | 0 | 0 | 0 | 0 | 0 | 0 | 0 | 1 | 0 | 0 | 1 | 1 |
| Tan, Kim Her | | 0 | 0 | 0 | 0 | 0 | 0 | 0 | 0 | 0 | 0 | 0 | 1 | 0 | 0 | 1 | 1 |
| Tan, Koong Le Pearly | Kedah | 0 | 0 | 0 | 0 | 0 | 1 | 0 | 0 | 0 | 0 | 0 | 0 | 0 | 0 | 1 | 1 |
| Tan, Soon Hooi | | 0 | 0 | 0 | 0 | 0 | 0 | 0 | 0 | 0 | 0 | 0 | 1 | 0 | 0 | 1 | 1 |
| Teoh, Siew Yong | Kedah | 0 | 0 | 0 | 0 | 0 | 1 | 0 | 0 | 0 | 0 | 0 | 0 | 0 | 0 | 1 | 1 |
| Thinaah, Muralitharan | Selangor | 0 | 0 | 0 | 0 | 0 | 1 | 0 | 0 | 0 | 0 | 0 | 0 | 0 | 0 | 1 | 1 |
| Wong, Pei Tty | Perak | 0 | 0 | 0 | 0 | 0 | 0 | 0 | 0 | 1 | 0 | 0 | 0 | 0 | 0 | 1 | 1 |
| Woon, Khe Wei Janice | Selangor | 0 | 0 | 0 | 0 | 0 | 1 | 0 | 0 | 0 | 0 | 0 | 0 | 0 | 0 | 1 | 1 |
| Zakry Bin Abdul Latif, Mohamad | Negeri Sembilan | 0 | 0 | 0 | 0 | 0 | 0 | 0 | 0 | 0 | 0 | 0 | 1 | 0 | 0 | 1 | 1 |
| Zulkarnain Bin Zainuddin, Iskandar | Kuala Lumpur | 0 | 0 | 0 | 0 | 0 | 0 | 0 | 0 | 0 | 0 | 0 | 1 | 0 | 0 | 1 | 1 |

=== Sub-Regional ===
==== Southeast Asian Games ====
| Medalists | State / Federal Territory | Singles | | | Doubles | | | Mixed Doubles | | | Men's / Women's Team | | | Total | | | |
| Medalists | State / Federal Territory | Gold | Silver | Bronze | Gold | Silver | Bronze | Gold | Silver | Bronze | Gold | Silver | Bronze | Gold | Silver | Bronze | |
|---|---|---|---|---|---|---|---|---|---|---|---|---|---|---|---|---|---|
| Ang, Rosalind Singha | Kedah | 2 | 2 | 0 | 4 | 3 | 0 | 2 | 2 | 0 | 2 | 3 | 0 | 10 | 10 | 0 | 20 |
| Ng, Meow Eng Sylvia | Johor | 4 | 0 | 0 | 2 | 2 | 0 | 0 | 1 | 1 | 2 | 1 | 0 | 8 | 4 | 1 | 13 |
| Ng, Boon Bee | Perak | 0 | 0 | 0 | 4 | 0 | 0 | 2 | 2 | 1 | 2 | 0 | 0 | 8 | 2 | 1 | 11 |
| Gunalan, Punch | Selangor | 2 | 1 | 0 | 2 | 1 | 0 | 0 | 0 | 1 | 1 | 1 | 0 | 5 | 3 | 1 | 9 |
| Cheah, Soon Kit | Perak | 0 | 0 | 0 | 2 | 0 | 1 | 0 | 0 | 1 | 2 | 4 | 0 | 4 | 4 | 2 | 10 |
| Tan, Yee Khan | Perak | 0 | 0 | 0 | 3 | 0 | 0 | 0 | 1 | 0 | 1 | 0 | 0 | 4 | 1 | 0 | 5 |
| Tan, Aik Huang | Penang | 2 | 0 | 0 | 0 | 0 | 1 | 0 | 0 | 0 | 2 | 0 | 0 | 4 | 0 | 1 | 5 |
| Razif Bin Mohamad Sidek | Selangor | 0 | 0 | 0 | 1 | 3 | 0 | 0 | 0 | 3 | 2 | 3 | 0 | 3 | 6 | 3 | 12 |
| Jalani Bin Mohamad Sidek | Selangor | 0 | 0 | 0 | 1 | 3 | 0 | 0 | 0 | 0 | 2 | 3 | 0 | 3 | 6 | 0 | 9 |
| Teoh, Siew Yong | Kedah | 0 | 0 | 1 | 2 | 2 | 0 | 1 | 0 | 1 | 0 | 2 | 0 | 3 | 4 | 2 | 9 |
| Soo, Beng Kiang | Kedah | 0 | 0 | 0 | 1 | 0 | 2 | 0 | 0 | 2 | 2 | 2 | 0 | 3 | 2 | 4 | 9 |
| Choong, Tan Fook | Perak | 0 | 0 | 0 | 1 | 0 | 2 | 0 | 0 | 0 | 2 | 1 | 1 | 3 | 1 | 3 | 7 |
| Lee, Wan Wah | Perak | 0 | 0 | 0 | 1 | 0 | 2 | 0 | 0 | 0 | 2 | 1 | 1 | 3 | 1 | 3 | 7 |
| Wong, Pei Tty | Perak | 0 | 0 | 0 | 2 | 0 | 2 | 0 | 0 | 3 | 1 | 0 | 3 | 3 | 0 | 8 | 11 |
| Chin, Eei Hui | Penang | 0 | 0 | 0 | 2 | 0 | 1 | 0 | 0 | 1 | 1 | 0 | 2 | 3 | 0 | 4 | 7 |
| Chew, Choon Eng | Penang | 0 | 0 | 0 | 0 | 1 | 1 | 1 | 0 | 3 | 1 | 2 | 1 | 2 | 3 | 5 | 10 |
| Foo, Kok Keong | Selangor | 0 | 0 | 3 | 0 | 0 | 0 | 0 | 0 | 0 | 2 | 3 | 0 | 2 | 3 | 3 | 8 |
| Rashid Bin Mohamad Sidek | Selangor | 0 | 0 | 3 | 0 | 0 | 0 | 0 | 0 | 0 | 2 | 3 | 0 | 2 | 3 | 3 | 8 |
| Wong, Choong Hann | Kuala Lumpur | 0 | 2 | 0 | 0 | 0 | 2 | 0 | 0 | 0 | 2 | 1 | 1 | 2 | 3 | 3 | 8 |
| Woon, Khe Wei Janice | Selangor | 0 | 0 | 0 | 1 | 1 | 1 | 0 | 0 | 0 | 1 | 2 | 2 | 2 | 3 | 3 | 8 |
| Roslin Bin Hashim, Muhammad | Kelantan | 1 | 0 | 2 | 0 | 0 | 0 | 0 | 0 | 1 | 1 | 2 | 1 | 2 | 2 | 4 | 8 |
| Yew, Cheng Hoe | Selangor | 0 | 0 | 2 | 1 | 0 | 2 | 0 | 1 | 0 | 1 | 0 | 0 | 2 | 1 | 4 | 7 |
| Wong, Mew Choo | Perak | 1 | 1 | 1 | 0 | 0 | 0 | 0 | 0 | 0 | 1 | 0 | 1 | 2 | 1 | 2 | 5 |
| Ng, Tat Wai | Penang | 0 | 0 | 0 | 0 | 1 | 0 | 1 | 0 | 0 | 1 | 0 | 0 | 2 | 1 | 0 | 2 |
| Chan, Chong Ming | Selangor | 0 | 0 | 0 | 0 | 0 | 2 | 0 | 0 | 0 | 2 | 0 | 0 | 2 | 0 | 2 | 4 |
| Ong, Ewe Hock | Penang | 0 | 1 | 2 | 0 | 0 | 0 | 0 | 0 | 0 | 1 | 3 | 0 | 1 | 4 | 2 | 7 |
| Soong Chok Soon, Dominic | Perak | 0 | 0 | 0 | 0 | 2 | 0 | 1 | 0 | 0 | 0 | 2 | 1 | 1 | 4 | 1 | 6 |
| Hoo, Kah Mun Vivian | Kuala Lumpur | 0 | 0 | 0 | 1 | 1 | 2 | 0 | 0 | 0 | 0 | 2 | 2 | 1 | 3 | 4 | 8 |
| Tan, Poon Neo Sylvia | Straits Settlements | 0 | 0 | 0 | 0 | 1 | 2 | 0 | 0 | 0 | 1 | 2 | 0 | 1 | 3 | 2 | 6 |
| Chia, Teng Fong Aaron | Malacca | 0 | 0 | 0 | 1 | 1 | 0 | 0 | 0 | 0 | 0 | 2 | 0 | 1 | 3 | 0 | 4 |
| Khaw née Tan, Gaik Bee | Penang | 1 | 0 | 0 | 0 | 2 | 0 | 0 | 1 | 0 | 0 | 0 | 0 | 1 | 3 | 0 | 2 |
| Soh, Wooi Yik | Kuala Lumpur | 0 | 0 | 0 | 1 | 1 | 0 | 0 | 0 | 0 | 0 | 2 | 0 | 1 | 3 | 0 | 4 |
| Koo, Kien Keat | Perak | 0 | 0 | 0 | 0 | 1 | 1 | 0 | 0 | 2 | 1 | 1 | 0 | 1 | 2 | 3 | 6 |
| Goh, Liu Ying | Malacca | 0 | 0 | 0 | 0 | 0 | 0 | 0 | 1 | 1 | 1 | 1 | 1 | 1 | 2 | 2 | 5 |
| Chen, Tang Jie | Perak | 0 | 0 | 0 | 0 | 0 | 0 | 1 | 0 | 1 | 0 | 2 | 0 | 1 | 2 | 1 | 4 |
| Goh, Jin Wei | Penang | 1 | 0 | 1 | 0 | 0 | 0 | 0 | 0 | 0 | 0 | 2 | 0 | 1 | 2 | 1 | 4 |
| Teh née Ng, Mei Ling | Penang | 0 | 0 | 0 | 0 | 0 | 1 | 1 | 1 | 0 | 0 | 1 | 0 | 1 | 2 | 1 | 4 |
| Yap, Kim Hock | Johor | 0 | 0 | 0 | 1 | 0 | 1 | 0 | 0 | 0 | 0 | 2 | 0 | 1 | 2 | 1 | 4 |
| Lee, Zii Jia | Kedah | 1 | 0 | 0 | 0 | 0 | 0 | 0 | 0 | 0 | 0 | 2 | 0 | 1 | 2 | 0 | 3 |
| Ong, Ewe Chye | Penang | 0 | 0 | 0 | 0 | 0 | 1 | 0 | 0 | 1 | 1 | 1 | 0 | 1 | 1 | 2 | 4 |
| Rahman Bin Mohamad Sidek | Selangor | 0 | 0 | 0 | 0 | 0 | 2 | 0 | 0 | 0 | 1 | 1 | 0 | 1 | 1 | 2 | 4 |
| Anscelly, Amelia Alicia | Sabah | 0 | 0 | 0 | 1 | 0 | 0 | 0 | 0 | 0 | 0 | 1 | 1 | 1 | 1 | 1 | 3 |
| Chong, Wei Feng | Kedah | 1 | 0 | 0 | 0 | 0 | 0 | 0 | 0 | 0 | 0 | 1 | 1 | 1 | 1 | 1 | 3 |
| Hafiz Bin Hashim, Muhammad | Kelantan | 0 | 0 | 1 | 0 | 0 | 0 | 0 | 0 | 0 | 1 | 1 | 0 | 1 | 1 | 1 | 3 |
| Kuan, Beng Hong | Kedah | 0 | 0 | 0 | 0 | 0 | 0 | 0 | 0 | 0 | 1 | 1 | 1 | 1 | 1 | 1 | 3 |
| Ong, Ah Hong | | 0 | 0 | 1 | 0 | 0 | 0 | 0 | 0 | 0 | 1 | 1 | 0 | 1 | 1 | 1 | 3 |
| Yap, Hei Lin | Penang | 0 | 0 | 0 | 0 | 0 | 0 | 0 | 0 | 1 | 1 | 1 | 0 | 1 | 1 | 1 | 3 |
| Ho, Khim Kooi | Penang | 0 | 0 | 0 | 0 | 1 | 0 | 0 | 0 | 0 | 1 | 0 | 0 | 1 | 1 | 0 | 2 |
| Soong, Fie Cho | Sabah | 0 | 0 | 0 | 1 | 0 | 0 | 0 | 0 | 0 | 0 | 1 | 0 | 1 | 1 | 0 | 2 |
| Teh, Swee Phek Katherine | | 0 | 0 | 1 | 0 | 0 | 1 | 0 | 0 | 0 | 1 | 0 | 2 | 1 | 0 | 4 | 5 |
| Cheah, Li Ya Lyddia | Kuala Lumpur | 0 | 0 | 1 | 0 | 0 | 0 | 0 | 0 | 0 | 1 | 0 | 2 | 1 | 0 | 3 | 4 |
| Lee, Chong Wei | Perak/Penang | 0 | 0 | 1 | 0 | 0 | 0 | 0 | 0 | 0 | 1 | 0 | 2 | 1 | 0 | 3 | 4 |
| Chor, Hooi Yee | | 0 | 0 | 0 | 0 | 0 | 0 | 1 | 0 | 1 | 0 | 0 | 1 | 1 | 0 | 2 | 3 |
| Chong, Sook Chin Sabrina | Selangor | 0 | 0 | 0 | 0 | 0 | 0 | 0 | 0 | 0 | 1 | 0 | 1 | 1 | 0 | 1 | 2 |
| Ng, Hui Lin | Kuala Lumpur | 0 | 0 | 0 | 0 | 0 | 0 | 0 | 0 | 0 | 1 | 0 | 1 | 1 | 0 | 1 | 2 |
| Selvaduray, Kisona | Negeri Sembilan | 1 | 0 | 0 | 0 | 0 | 0 | 0 | 0 | 0 | 0 | 0 | 1 | 1 | 0 | 1 | 2 |
| Tan, Koong Le Pearly | Kedah | 0 | 0 | 0 | 1 | 0 | 0 | 0 | 0 | 0 | 0 | 0 | 1 | 1 | 0 | 1 | 2 |
| Thinaah, Muralitharan | Selangor | 0 | 0 | 0 | 1 | 0 | 0 | 0 | 0 | 0 | 0 | 0 | 1 | 1 | 0 | 1 | 2 |
| Peck, Yen Wei | Kuala Lumpur | 0 | 0 | 0 | 0 | 0 | 0 | 1 | 0 | 0 | 0 | 0 | 0 | 1 | 0 | 0 | 1 |
| Rahman Bin Mohamad, Abdul | | 0 | 0 | 0 | 0 | 0 | 0 | 0 | 0 | 0 | 1 | 0 | 0 | 1 | 0 | 0 | 1 |
| Saniru, Sannatasah | Sabah | 0 | 0 | 0 | 0 | 0 | 0 | 0 | 0 | 0 | 1 | 0 | 0 | 1 | 0 | 0 | 1 |
| Goh, Soon Huat | Malacca | 0 | 0 | 0 | 0 | 0 | 0 | 0 | 2 | 0 | 0 | 3 | 0 | 0 | 5 | 0 | 5 |
| Misbun Bin Mohamad Sidek | Selangor | 0 | 0 | 2 | 0 | 0 | 1 | 0 | 0 | 0 | 0 | 4 | 0 | 0 | 4 | 3 | 7 |
| Chan, Peng Soon | Penang | 0 | 0 | 0 | 0 | 0 | 0 | 0 | 1 | 2 | 0 | 2 | 1 | 0 | 3 | 3 | 6 |
| Tan, Kim Her | | 0 | 0 | 0 | 0 | 0 | 1 | 0 | 0 | 1 | 0 | 3 | 0 | 0 | 3 | 2 | 5 |
| Lai, Shevon Jemie | Selangor | 0 | 0 | 0 | 0 | 0 | 0 | 0 | 2 | 0 | 0 | 1 | 1 | 0 | 3 | 1 | 4 |
| Moo, Foot Lian | Selangor | 0 | 0 | 1 | 0 | 0 | 0 | 0 | 0 | 0 | 0 | 3 | 0 | 0 | 3 | 1 | 4 |
| Ong, Yew Sin | Malacca | 0 | 0 | 0 | 0 | 1 | 1 | 0 | 0 | 0 | 0 | 2 | 0 | 0 | 3 | 1 | 4 |
| Teo, Ee Yi | Johor | 0 | 0 | 0 | 0 | 1 | 1 | 0 | 0 | 0 | 0 | 2 | 0 | 0 | 3 | 1 | 4 |
| Hoo, Pang Ron | Kuala Lumpur | 0 | 0 | 0 | 0 | 0 | 0 | 0 | 1 | 0 | 0 | 2 | 0 | 0 | 3 | 0 | 3 |
| Rosman Bin Abdul Razak | | 0 | 0 | 0 | 0 | 0 | 0 | 0 | 1 | 0 | 0 | 2 | 0 | 0 | 3 | 0 | 3 |
| Cheah, Su Ya Soniia | Kuala Lumpur | 0 | 1 | 0 | 0 | 0 | 0 | 0 | 0 | 0 | 0 | 1 | 2 | 0 | 2 | 2 | 4 |
| Cheah, Yee See | Penang | 0 | 0 | 0 | 0 | 0 | 1 | 0 | 1 | 1 | 0 | 1 | 0 | 0 | 2 | 2 | 4 |
| Leong, Jun Hao | Kuala Lumpur | 0 | 0 | 2 | 0 | 0 | 0 | 0 | 0 | 0 | 0 | 2 | 0 | 0 | 2 | 2 | 4 |
| Ong, Beng Teong | Selangor | 0 | 0 | 1 | 0 | 0 | 1 | 0 | 0 | 0 | 0 | 2 | 0 | 0 | 2 | 2 | 4 |
| Selvaraj Joseph, James | Selangor | 0 | 0 | 1 | 0 | 0 | 0 | 0 | 0 | 0 | 0 | 2 | 1 | 0 | 2 | 2 | 4 |
| Arif Bin Abdul Latif, Mohamad | Negeri Sembilan | 0 | 1 | 0 | 0 | 0 | 0 | 0 | 0 | 0 | 0 | 1 | 1 | 0 | 2 | 1 | 3 |
| Cheah, Hong Chong | Selangor | 0 | 0 | 1 | 0 | 1 | 0 | 0 | 1 | 0 | 0 | 0 | 0 | 0 | 2 | 1 | 3 |
| Ho, Cheng Yoke | Selangor | 0 | 0 | 0 | 0 | 1 | 1 | 0 | 0 | 0 | 0 | 1 | 0 | 0 | 2 | 1 | 3 |
| Hoh, Shou Wei Justin | Kuala Lumpur | 0 | 0 | 1 | 0 | 0 | 0 | 0 | 0 | 0 | 0 | 2 | 0 | 0 | 2 | 1 | 3 |
| Lee, Shun Yang | Penang | 0 | 0 | 1 | 0 | 0 | 0 | 0 | 0 | 0 | 0 | 2 | 0 | 0 | 2 | 1 | 3 |
| Man, Wei Chong | Selangor | 0 | 0 | 0 | 0 | 0 | 1 | 0 | 0 | 0 | 0 | 2 | 0 | 0 | 2 | 1 | 3 |
| Ong, Teong Boon | | 0 | 0 | 0 | 0 | 0 | 1 | 0 | 0 | 0 | 0 | 2 | 0 | 0 | 2 | 1 | 3 |
| Saw, Swee Leong | Penang | 0 | 0 | 0 | 0 | 0 | 0 | 0 | 0 | 0 | 0 | 2 | 1 | 0 | 2 | 1 | 3 |
| Tee, Kai Wun | Malacca | 0 | 0 | 0 | 0 | 0 | 1 | 0 | 0 | 0 | 0 | 2 | 0 | 0 | 2 | 1 | 3 |
| Ho, Yen Mei | Kuala Lumpur | 0 | 0 | 0 | 0 | 0 | 0 | 0 | 0 | 0 | 0 | 2 | 0 | 0 | 2 | 0 | 2 |
| Kok, Jing Hong Jacky | Kedah | 0 | 0 | 0 | 0 | 0 | 0 | 0 | 0 | 0 | 0 | 2 | 0 | 0 | 2 | 0 | 2 |
| Liew, Daren | Kuala Lumpur | 0 | 0 | 0 | 0 | 0 | 0 | 0 | 0 | 0 | 0 | 2 | 0 | 0 | 2 | 0 | 2 |
| Sholeh Bin Ali Sadikin, Aidil | Selangor | 0 | 0 | 0 | 0 | 0 | 0 | 0 | 0 | 0 | 0 | 2 | 0 | 0 | 2 | 0 | 2 |
| Soong, Joo Ven | Selangor | 0 | 0 | 0 | 0 | 0 | 0 | 0 | 0 | 0 | 0 | 2 | 0 | 0 | 2 | 0 | 2 |
| Tan, Aik Mong | Penang | 0 | 1 | 0 | 0 | 0 | 0 | 0 | 0 | 0 | 0 | 1 | 0 | 0 | 2 | 0 | 2 |
| Tan, Boon Heong | Kedah | 0 | 0 | 0 | 0 | 1 | 0 | 0 | 0 | 0 | 0 | 1 | 0 | 0 | 2 | 0 | 2 |
| Wong, Jee Weng Jason | | 0 | 0 | 0 | 0 | 0 | 0 | 0 | 0 | 0 | 0 | 2 | 0 | 0 | 2 | 0 | 2 |
| Yap, Roy King | Malacca | 0 | 0 | 0 | 0 | 0 | 0 | 0 | 1 | 0 | 0 | 1 | 0 | 0 | 2 | 0 | 2 |
| Ang, Li Peng | Selangor | 0 | 0 | 0 | 0 | 1 | 0 | 0 | 0 | 1 | 0 | 0 | 3 | 0 | 1 | 4 | 5 |
| Lai, Pei Jing | Pahang | 0 | 0 | 0 | 0 | 0 | 0 | 0 | 0 | 2 | 0 | 1 | 2 | 0 | 1 | 4 | 5 |
| Norhasikin Binti Amin | | 0 | 0 | 0 | 0 | 0 | 1 | 0 | 1 | 0 | 0 | 0 | 3 | 0 | 1 | 4 | 5 |
| Goh, V Shem | Kuala Lumpur | 0 | 0 | 0 | 0 | 0 | 2 | 0 | 0 | 0 | 0 | 1 | 1 | 0 | 1 | 3 | 4 |
| Cheng, Su Yin | Kedah | 0 | 0 | 0 | 0 | 0 | 1 | 0 | 1 | 0 | 0 | 0 | 1 | 0 | 1 | 2 | 3 |
| Chow, Mei Kuan | Kuala Lumpur | 0 | 0 | 0 | 0 | 0 | 1 | 0 | 0 | 0 | 0 | 1 | 1 | 0 | 1 | 2 | 3 |
| Lee, Meng Yean | Malacca | 0 | 0 | 0 | 0 | 0 | 1 | 0 | 0 | 0 | 0 | 1 | 1 | 0 | 1 | 2 | 3 |
| Lim, Khim Wah | Penang | 0 | 0 | 0 | 0 | 0 | 2 | 0 | 0 | 0 | 0 | 1 | 0 | 0 | 1 | 2 | 3 |
| Chang, Kim Wai | Perak | 0 | 0 | 0 | 0 | 1 | 0 | 0 | 0 | 0 | 0 | 0 | 1 | 0 | 1 | 1 | 2 |
| Fairuzizuan Bin Mohamad Tazari, Mohamad | Perak | 0 | 0 | 0 | 0 | 0 | 1 | 0 | 0 | 0 | 0 | 1 | 1 | 0 | 1 | 1 | 2 |
| Lee, Ying Ying | Perak | 0 | 0 | 0 | 0 | 0 | 0 | 0 | 0 | 0 | 0 | 1 | 1 | 0 | 1 | 1 | 2 |
| Lim, Pek Siah | | 0 | 0 | 0 | 0 | 1 | 0 | 0 | 0 | 0 | 0 | 0 | 1 | 0 | 1 | 1 | 2 |
| Mak, Hee Chun | Perak | 0 | 0 | 0 | 0 | 0 | 0 | 0 | 0 | 0 | 0 | 1 | 1 | 0 | 1 | 1 | 2 |
| Soh, Goon Chup | | 0 | 0 | 0 | 0 | 0 | 1 | 0 | 0 | 0 | 0 | 1 | 0 | 0 | 1 | 1 | 2 |
| Tan, Kian Meng | Johor | 0 | 0 | 0 | 0 | 0 | 0 | 0 | 0 | 1 | 0 | 1 | 0 | 0 | 1 | 1 | 2 |
| Tee, Jing Yi | Penang | 0 | 0 | 0 | 0 | 0 | 0 | 0 | 0 | 0 | 0 | 1 | 1 | 0 | 1 | 1 | 2 |
| Zakry Bin Abdul Latif, Mohamad | Negeri Sembilan | 0 | 0 | 0 | 0 | 0 | 1 | 0 | 0 | 0 | 0 | 1 | 1 | 0 | 1 | 1 | 2 |
| Zulkarnain Bin Zainuddin, Iskandar | Kuala Lumpur | 0 | 0 | 0 | 0 | 0 | 0 | 0 | 0 | 0 | 0 | 1 | 1 | 0 | 1 | 1 | 2 |
| Arif Bin Wan Junaidi, Wan Muhammad | Terengganu | 0 | 0 | 0 | 0 | 0 | 0 | 0 | 0 | 0 | 0 | 1 | 0 | 0 | 1 | 0 | 1 |
| Beh, Chun Meng Rayner | Penang | 0 | 0 | 0 | 0 | 0 | 0 | 0 | 0 | 0 | 0 | 1 | 0 | 0 | 1 | 0 | 1 |
| Chia, Wei Jie | Kuala Lumpur | 0 | 0 | 0 | 0 | 0 | 0 | 0 | 0 | 0 | 0 | 1 | 0 | 0 | 1 | 0 | 1 |
| Chong, Weng Kai | | 0 | 0 | 0 | 0 | 0 | 0 | 0 | 0 | 0 | 0 | 1 | 0 | 0 | 1 | 0 | 1 |
| Choong, Hon Jian | Penang | 0 | 0 | 0 | 0 | 0 | 0 | 0 | 0 | 0 | 0 | 1 | 0 | 0 | 1 | 0 | 1 |
| Chuah, Han Khim | | 0 | 0 | 0 | 0 | 0 | 0 | 0 | 0 | 0 | 0 | 1 | 0 | 0 | 1 | 0 | 1 |
| Eiman Bin Shahyar, Muhammad Shaqeem | Selangor | 0 | 0 | 0 | 0 | 0 | 0 | 0 | 0 | 0 | 0 | 1 | 0 | 0 | 1 | 0 | 1 |
| Ewe, Eon Eogene | Perak | 0 | 0 | 0 | 0 | 0 | 0 | 0 | 0 | 0 | 0 | 1 | 0 | 0 | 1 | 0 | 1 |
| Goh, Boon Zhe | Penang | 0 | 0 | 0 | 0 | 0 | 0 | 0 | 0 | 0 | 0 | 1 | 0 | 0 | 1 | 0 | 1 |
| Goh, Sze Fei | Malacca | 0 | 0 | 0 | 0 | 0 | 0 | 0 | 0 | 0 | 0 | 1 | 0 | 0 | 1 | 0 | 1 |
| Haikal Bin Nazri, Muhammad | Kelantan | 0 | 0 | 0 | 0 | 0 | 0 | 0 | 0 | 0 | 0 | 1 | 0 | 0 | 1 | 0 | 1 |
| Ho, Khim Soon | Penang | 0 | 0 | 0 | 0 | 0 | 0 | 0 | 0 | 0 | 0 | 1 | 0 | 0 | 1 | 0 | 1 |
| Izzuddin Bin Rumsani, Nur | Johor | 0 | 0 | 0 | 0 | 0 | 0 | 0 | 0 | 0 | 0 | 1 | 0 | 0 | 1 | 0 | 1 |
| Kwan, Yoke Meng | Selangor | 0 | 0 | 0 | 0 | 0 | 0 | 0 | 0 | 0 | 0 | 1 | 0 | 0 | 1 | 0 | 1 |
| Kwek, Chiew Peng | Negeri Sembilan | 0 | 0 | 0 | 0 | 0 | 0 | 0 | 0 | 0 | 0 | 1 | 0 | 0 | 1 | 0 | 1 |
| Lee, Chee Leong | | 0 | 0 | 0 | 0 | 0 | 0 | 0 | 0 | 0 | 0 | 1 | 0 | 0 | 1 | 0 | 1 |
| Liew, Xun | Johor | 0 | 0 | 0 | 0 | 0 | 0 | 0 | 0 | 0 | 0 | 1 | 0 | 0 | 1 | 0 | 1 |
| Lim, Chi Wing | Kuala Lumpur | 0 | 0 | 0 | 0 | 0 | 0 | 0 | 0 | 0 | 0 | 1 | 0 | 0 | 1 | 0 | 1 |
| Lim, Chong King | Kuala Lumpur | 0 | 0 | 0 | 0 | 0 | 0 | 0 | 0 | 0 | 0 | 1 | 0 | 0 | 1 | 0 | 1 |
| Lim, Yin Fun | Kuala Lumpur | 0 | 0 | 0 | 0 | 0 | 0 | 0 | 0 | 0 | 0 | 1 | 0 | 0 | 1 | 0 | 1 |
| Moey, Sam Kooi Jean | Selangor | 0 | 0 | 0 | 0 | 1 | 0 | 0 | 0 | 0 | 0 | 0 | 0 | 0 | 1 | 0 | 1 |
| Ong, Jian Guo | Malacca | 0 | 0 | 0 | 0 | 0 | 0 | 0 | 0 | 0 | 0 | 1 | 0 | 0 | 1 | 0 | 1 |
| Ong, Ken Yon | Malacca | 0 | 0 | 0 | 0 | 0 | 0 | 0 | 0 | 0 | 0 | 1 | 0 | 0 | 1 | 0 | 1 |
| Ong, Soon Hock | Selangor | 0 | 0 | 0 | 0 | 0 | 0 | 0 | 0 | 0 | 0 | 1 | 0 | 0 | 1 | 0 | 1 |
| Phua, Ah Hua | | 0 | 0 | 0 | 0 | 0 | 0 | 0 | 0 | 0 | 0 | 1 | 0 | 0 | 1 | 0 | 1 |
| Wong, Tat Meng | Kedah | 0 | 0 | 0 | 0 | 0 | 0 | 0 | 0 | 0 | 0 | 1 | 0 | 0 | 1 | 0 | 1 |
| Wong, Ewee Mun | | 0 | 0 | 0 | 0 | 0 | 0 | 0 | 0 | 0 | 0 | 1 | 0 | 0 | 1 | 0 | 1 |
| Yong, Hock Kin | Negeri Sembilan | 0 | 0 | 0 | 0 | 0 | 0 | 0 | 0 | 0 | 0 | 1 | 0 | 0 | 1 | 0 | 1 |
| Zaim Bin Abdul Khalid, Mohamad Lutfi | Pahang | 0 | 0 | 0 | 0 | 0 | 0 | 0 | 0 | 0 | 0 | 1 | 0 | 0 | 1 | 0 | 1 |
| Tan, Lee Wai | | 0 | 0 | 0 | 0 | 0 | 3 | 0 | 0 | 2 | 0 | 0 | 3 | 0 | 0 | 8 | 8 |
| Tan, Sui Hoon | Penang | 0 | 0 | 0 | 0 | 0 | 2 | 0 | 0 | 2 | 0 | 0 | 4 | 0 | 0 | 8 | 8 |
| Leong, Choi Lean | | 0 | 0 | 0 | 0 | 0 | 0 | 0 | 0 | 3 | 0 | 0 | 4 | 0 | 0 | 7 | 7 |
| Lee, Wai Leng | | 0 | 0 | 1 | 0 | 0 | 2 | 0 | 0 | 0 | 0 | 0 | 3 | 0 | 0 | 6 | 6 |
| Lim, Siew Choon | Penang | 0 | 0 | 0 | 0 | 0 | 1 | 0 | 0 | 1 | 0 | 0 | 3 | 0 | 0 | 5 | 5 |
| Ng, Mee Fen Stephanie | | 0 | 0 | 1 | 0 | 0 | 0 | 0 | 0 | 0 | 0 | 0 | 2 | 0 | 0 | 3 | 3 |
| Poon, Juliet | | 0 | 0 | 0 | 0 | 0 | 1 | 0 | 0 | 0 | 0 | 0 | 2 | 0 | 0 | 3 | 3 |
| Tan, Mei Chuan | | 0 | 0 | 1 | 0 | 0 | 0 | 0 | 0 | 0 | 0 | 0 | 2 | 0 | 0 | 3 | 3 |
| Wong, Pei Xian Julia | Malacca | 0 | 0 | 1 | 0 | 0 | 0 | 0 | 0 | 0 | 0 | 0 | 2 | 0 | 0 | 3 | 3 |
| Boopathy, Ishwari | | 0 | 0 | 0 | 0 | 0 | 0 | 0 | 0 | 0 | 0 | 0 | 2 | 0 | 0 | 2 | 2 |
| Cheng, Su Hui | Kedah | 0 | 0 | 0 | 0 | 0 | 2 | 0 | 0 | 0 | 0 | 0 | 0 | 0 | 0 | 2 | 2 |
| Gan, Teik Chai James | Kedah | 0 | 0 | 0 | 0 | 0 | 1 | 0 | 0 | 0 | 0 | 0 | 1 | 0 | 0 | 2 | 2 |
| Kok, Chan Fong | | 0 | 0 | 0 | 0 | 0 | 0 | 0 | 0 | 0 | 0 | 0 | 2 | 0 | 0 | 2 | 2 |
| Lee, Yin Yin | | 0 | 0 | 0 | 0 | 0 | 0 | 0 | 0 | 0 | 0 | 0 | 2 | 0 | 0 | 2 | 2 |
| Lin, Woon Fui Robert | Kuala Lumpur | 0 | 0 | 0 | 0 | 0 | 1 | 0 | 0 | 0 | 0 | 0 | 1 | 0 | 0 | 2 | 2 |
| Quay, Swee Ling Joanne | | 0 | 0 | 0 | 0 | 0 | 0 | 0 | 0 | 0 | 0 | 0 | 2 | 0 | 0 | 2 | 2 |
| Tan, Aik Quan | Kedah | 0 | 0 | 0 | 0 | 0 | 0 | 0 | 0 | 1 | 0 | 0 | 1 | 0 | 0 | 2 | 2 |
| Teo, Kok Siang | Johor | 0 | 0 | 0 | 0 | 0 | 1 | 0 | 0 | 0 | 0 | 0 | 1 | 0 | 0 | 2 | 2 |
| Toh, Ee Wei | Malacca | 0 | 0 | 0 | 0 | 0 | 0 | 0 | 0 | 1 | 0 | 0 | 1 | 0 | 0 | 2 | 2 |
| Wong, Ling Ching Astrid | Sarawak | 0 | 0 | 1 | 0 | 0 | 0 | 0 | 0 | 0 | 0 | 0 | 1 | 0 | 0 | 2 | 2 |
| Wong, Miew Kheng | Perak | 0 | 0 | 1 | 0 | 0 | 0 | 0 | 0 | 0 | 0 | 0 | 1 | 0 | 0 | 2 | 2 |
| Woon, Sze Mei | | 0 | 0 | 0 | 0 | 0 | 0 | 0 | 0 | 0 | 0 | 0 | 2 | 0 | 0 | 2 | 2 |
| Chan, Chia Fong | | 0 | 0 | 0 | 0 | 0 | 0 | 0 | 0 | 0 | 0 | 0 | 1 | 0 | 0 | 1 | 1 |
| Chan, Kwong Beng | Perak | 0 | 0 | 0 | 0 | 0 | 0 | 0 | 0 | 0 | 0 | 0 | 1 | 0 | 0 | 1 | 1 |
| Chong, Nga Fan | | 0 | 0 | 0 | 0 | 0 | 0 | 0 | 0 | 0 | 0 | 0 | 1 | 0 | 0 | 1 | 1 |
| Eoon, Qi Xuan | Perak | 0 | 0 | 0 | 0 | 0 | 0 | 0 | 0 | 0 | 0 | 0 | 1 | 0 | 0 | 1 | 1 |
| Eng, Ler Qi | Selangor | 0 | 0 | 0 | 0 | 0 | 0 | 0 | 0 | 0 | 0 | 0 | 1 | 0 | 0 | 1 | 1 |
| Go, Pei Kee | Johor | 0 | 0 | 0 | 0 | 0 | 0 | 0 | 0 | 0 | 0 | 0 | 1 | 0 | 0 | 1 | 1 |
| Kaur D/O Mohinder Singh, Anita Raj | Sarawak | 0 | 0 | 0 | 0 | 0 | 0 | 0 | 0 | 0 | 0 | 0 | 1 | 0 | 0 | 1 | 1 |
| Khoo, Chung Chiat | Kedah | 0 | 0 | 0 | 0 | 0 | 0 | 0 | 0 | 0 | 0 | 0 | 1 | 0 | 0 | 1 | 1 |
| Khor, Cheng Chye | Selangor | 0 | 0 | 0 | 0 | 0 | 1 | 0 | 0 | 0 | 0 | 0 | 1 | 0 | 0 | 1 | 1 |
| Koay, Kar Lin | Penang | 0 | 0 | 0 | 0 | 0 | 0 | 0 | 0 | 0 | 0 | 0 | 1 | 0 | 0 | 1 | 1 |
| Kuak, Seok Choon | | 0 | 0 | 0 | 0 | 0 | 0 | 0 | 0 | 0 | 0 | 0 | 1 | 0 | 0 | 1 | 1 |
| Kuak, Sipok Choon | | 0 | 0 | 0 | 0 | 0 | 0 | 0 | 0 | 0 | 0 | 0 | 1 | 0 | 0 | 1 | 1 |
| Law, Pei Pei | | 0 | 0 | 0 | 0 | 0 | 0 | 0 | 0 | 0 | 0 | 0 | 1 | 0 | 0 | 1 | 1 |
| Lee, Guan Chong | Selangor | 0 | 0 | 0 | 0 | 0 | 0 | 0 | 0 | 1 | 0 | 0 | 0 | 0 | 0 | 1 | 1 |
| Lee, Xin Jie | Penang | 0 | 0 | 0 | 0 | 0 | 1 | 0 | 0 | 0 | 0 | 0 | 0 | 0 | 0 | 1 | 1 |
| Letshanaa, Karupathevan | Selangor | 0 | 0 | 0 | 0 | 0 | 0 | 0 | 0 | 0 | 0 | 0 | 1 | 0 | 0 | 1 | 1 |
| Lim, Yin Loo | Negeri Sembilan | 0 | 0 | 0 | 0 | 0 | 0 | 0 | 0 | 0 | 0 | 0 | 1 | 0 | 0 | 1 | 1 |
| Mooi, Hing Yau | Perak | 0 | 0 | 0 | 0 | 0 | 0 | 0 | 0 | 0 | 0 | 0 | 1 | 0 | 0 | 1 | 1 |
| Mudukasan, Sutheaswari | Kuala Lumpur | 0 | 0 | 0 | 0 | 0 | 0 | 0 | 0 | 0 | 0 | 0 | 1 | 0 | 0 | 1 | 1 |
| Ng, Poau Leng Marylen | Sabah | 0 | 0 | 0 | 0 | 0 | 0 | 0 | 0 | 0 | 0 | 0 | 1 | 0 | 0 | 1 | 1 |
| Ng, Seow Meng Billy | Johor | 0 | 0 | 1 | 0 | 0 | 0 | 0 | 0 | 0 | 0 | 0 | 0 | 0 | 0 | 1 | 1 |
| Norshahliza Binti Baharum | | 0 | 0 | 0 | 0 | 0 | 0 | 0 | 0 | 0 | 0 | 0 | 1 | 0 | 0 | 1 | 1 |
| Ooi, Sock Ai | | 0 | 0 | 0 | 0 | 0 | 0 | 0 | 0 | 0 | 0 | 0 | 1 | 0 | 0 | 1 | 1 |
| Ow, Yao Han | Malacca | 0 | 0 | 0 | 0 | 0 | 1 | 0 | 0 | 0 | 0 | 0 | 0 | 0 | 0 | 1 | 1 |
| Razif Bin Abdul Latif, Mohammed | Negeri Sembilan | 0 | 0 | 0 | 0 | 0 | 0 | 0 | 0 | 0 | 0 | 0 | 1 | 0 | 0 | 1 | 1 |
| Tan, Chun Seang | Kedah | 0 | 0 | 0 | 0 | 0 | 0 | 0 | 0 | 0 | 0 | 0 | 1 | 0 | 0 | 1 | 1 |
| Tan, Wee Kiong | Johor/Sabah | 0 | 0 | 0 | 0 | 0 | 0 | 0 | 0 | 0 | 0 | 0 | 1 | 0 | 0 | 1 | 1 |
| Teh, Kew San | Penang | 0 | 0 | 1 | 0 | 0 | 0 | 0 | 0 | 0 | 0 | 0 | 0 | 0 | 0 | 1 | 1 |
| Teoh, Mei Xing | Selangor | 0 | 0 | 0 | 0 | 0 | 0 | 0 | 0 | 0 | 0 | 0 | 1 | 0 | 0 | 1 | 1 |
| Wong, Mee Hung | Sarawak | 0 | 0 | 0 | 0 | 0 | 0 | 0 | 0 | 0 | 0 | 0 | 1 | 0 | 0 | 1 | 1 |
| Yang, Li Lian | Selangor | 0 | 0 | 0 | 0 | 0 | 0 | 0 | 0 | 0 | 0 | 0 | 1 | 0 | 0 | 1 | 1 |
| Yeoh, Kay Bin | Perak | 0 | 0 | 0 | 0 | 0 | 0 | 0 | 0 | 0 | 0 | 0 | 1 | 0 | 0 | 1 | 1 |
| Zamaliah Binti Mohamad Sidek | Selangor | 0 | 0 | 0 | 0 | 0 | 0 | 0 | 0 | 0 | 0 | 0 | 1 | 0 | 0 | 1 | 1 |
| Zulaikha binti Muhammad Azmi, Siti | Malacca | 0 | 0 | 0 | 0 | 0 | 0 | 0 | 0 | 0 | 0 | 0 | 1 | 0 | 0 | 1 | 1 |

== Team championships ==
=== Thomas & Uber Cup ===
(Note: Malaysia has never medalled in the World Team Championships for Women, more commonly known as the Uber Cup, thus all shuttlers listed in this section are Thomas Cup (World Men's Team Championships) medalists.) (Note: Bronze medals only began to be awarded to losing semi-finalists from the 1984 edition of the Thomas & Uber Cup.)

| Medalists | State / Federal Territory | Gold | Silver | Bronze | Total | | |
|---|---|---|---|---|---|---|---|
| Medalists | State / Federal Territory | Ooi, Teik Hock | Penang | 3 | 1 | N/A | 4 |
| Ong, Poh Lim | Sarawak/ Singapore | 3 | 0 | N/A | 3 | | |
| Wong, Peng Soon | Johor/ Singapore | 3 | 0 | N/A | 3 | | |
| Chan, Kon Leong | Selangor | 2 | 0 | N/A | 2 | | |
| Cheah, Soon Kit | Perak | 1 | 4 | 1 | 6 | | |
| Foo, Kok Keong | Selangor | 1 | 3 | 1 | 5 | | |
| Jalani Bin Mohamad Sidek | Selangor | 1 | 3 | 1 | 5 | | |
| Rashid Bin Mohamad Sidek | Selangor | 1 | 3 | 1 | 5 | | |
| Razif Bin Mohamad Sidek | Selangor | 1 | 3 | 1 | 5 | | |
| Soo, Beng Kiang | Kedah | 1 | 3 | 0 | 4 | | |
| Abdullah Bin Piruz | Selangor | 1 | 1 | N/A | 2 | | |
| Choong, Ewe Beng "Eddy" | Penang | 1 | 1 | N/A | 2 | | |
| Kwan, Yoke Meng | Selangor | 1 | 1 | 0 | 2 | | |
| Ng, Boon Bee | Perak | 1 | 1 | N/A | 2 | | |
| Tan, Aik Huang | Penang | 1 | 1 | N/A | 2 | | |
| Teh, Kew San | Penang | 1 | 1 | N/A | 2 | | |
| Ismail Bin Marjan | Singapore | 1 | 0 | N/A | 1 | | |
| Law, Teik Hock | Penang | 1 | 0 | N/A | 1 | | |
| Lim, Kee Fong | Selangor | 1 | 0 | N/A | 1 | | |
| Tan, Jin Eong | Perak | 1 | 0 | N/A | 1 | | |
| Tan, Yee Khan | Perak | 1 | 0 | N/A | 1 | | |
| Teoh, Seng Khoon | Perak | 1 | 0 | N/A | 1 | | |
| Yeoh, Teck Chye | Selangor | 1 | 0 | N/A | 1 | | |
| Yew, Cheng Hoe | Selangor | 1 | 0 | N/A | 1 | | |
| Ong, Ewe Hock | Penang | 0 | 3 | 0 | 3 | | |
| Choong, Tan Fook | Perak | 0 | 2 | 2 | 4 | | |
| Lee, Wan Wah | Perak | 0 | 2 | 2 | 4 | | |
| Roslin Bin Hashim, Muhammad | Kelantan | 0 | 2 | 0 | 2 | | |
| Tan, Kim Her | | 0 | 2 | 0 | 2 | | |
| Yap, Kim Hock | Johor | 0 | 2 | 0 | 2 | | |
| Lee, Chong Wei | Perak/Penang | 0 | 1 | 4 | 5 | | |
| Tan, Boon Heong | Kedah | 0 | 1 | 4 | 5 | | |
| Hafiz Bin Hashim, Muhammad | Kelantan | 0 | 1 | 3 | 4 | | |
| Wong, Choong Hann | Kuala Lumpur | 0 | 1 | 3 | 4 | | |
| Chan, Chong Ming | Selangor | 0 | 1 | 1 | 2 | | |
| Chew, Choon Eng | Penang | 0 | 1 | 1 | 2 | | |
| Chong, Wei Feng | Kedah | 0 | 1 | 1 | 2 | | |
| Goh, Soon Huat | Malacca | 0 | 1 | 1 | 2 | | |
| Goh, V Shem | Kuala Lumpur | 0 | 1 | 1 | 2 | | |
| Hoon, Thien How | Kuala Lumpur | 0 | 1 | 1 | 2 | | |
| Misbun Bin Mohamad Sidek | Selangor | 0 | 1 | 1 | 2 | | |
| Ong, Beng Teong | Selangor | 0 | 1 | 1 | 2 | | |
| Tan, Wee Kiong | Johor/Sabah | 0 | 1 | 1 | 2 | | |
| Chan, Peng Soon | Penang | 0 | 1 | 0 | 1 | | |
| Cheah, Hong Chong | | 0 | 1 | N/A | 1 | | |
| Gunalan, Punch | Selangor | 0 | 1 | N/A | 1 | | |
| Heah, Hock Aun "Johnny" | Penang | 0 | 1 | N/A | 1 | | |
| Lee, Tsuen Seng | Perak | 0 | 1 | 0 | 1 | | |
| Liew, Daren | Kuala Lumpur | 0 | 1 | 0 | 1 | | |
| Lim, Khim Wah | Penang | 0 | 1 | 0 | 1 | | |
| Lim, Say Hup | Penang | 0 | 1 | N/A | 1 | | |
| Moo, Foot Lian | Selangor | 0 | 1 | N/A | 1 | | |
| Ng, Tat Wai | Penang | 0 | 1 | N/A | 1 | | |
| Phua, Ah Hua | | 0 | 1 | N/A | 1 | | |
| Rahman Bin Mohamed, Abdul | | 0 | 1 | N/A | 1 | | |
| Saw, Swee Leong | Penang | 0 | 1 | N/A | 1 | | |
| Selvaraj Joseph, James | Selangor | 0 | 1 | N/A | 1 | | |
| Soong, Chok Soon Dominic | Perak | 0 | 1 | N/A | 1 | | |
| Yong, Hock Kin | Negeri Sembilan | 0 | 1 | 0 | 1 | | |
| Koo, Kien Keat | Perak | 0 | 0 | 4 | 4 | | |
| Fairuzizuan Bin Mohamad Tazari, Mohamad | Perak | 0 | 0 | 2 | 2 | | |
| Zakry Bin Abdul Latif, Mohamad | Negeri Sembilan | 0 | 0 | 2 | 2 | | |
| Arif Bin Abdul Latif, Mohamad | Negeri Sembilan | 0 | 0 | 1 | 1 | | |
| Kuan, Beng Hong | Kedah | 0 | 0 | 1 | 1 | | |
| Ong, Soon Hock | Selangor | 0 | 0 | 1 | 1 | | |
| Ong, Yew Sin | Malacca | 0 | 0 | 1 | 1 | | |
| Tan, Chun Seang | Kedah | 0 | 0 | 1 | 1 | | |
| Teo, Ee Yi | Johor | 0 | 0 | 1 | 1 | | |
| Zulkarnain Bin Zainuddin, Iskandar | Kuala Lumpur | 0 | 0 | 1 | 1 | | |

=== Sudirman Cup ===
| Medalists | State / Federal Territory | Gold | Silver | Bronze | Total |
|---|---|---|---|---|---|
| Chen, Tang Jie | Perak | 0 | 0 | 2 | 2 |
| Chia, Teng Fong Aaron | Malacca | 0 | 0 | 2 | 2 |
| Hoo, Pang Ron | Kuala Lumpur | 0 | 0 | 2 | 2 |
| Karupathevan, Letshanaa | Selangor | 0 | 0 | 2 | 2 |
| Lee, Zii Jia | Kedah | 0 | 0 | 2 | 2 |
| Muralitharan, Thinaah | Selangor | 0 | 0 | 2 | 2 |
| Ng, Tze Yong | Johor | 0 | 0 | 2 | 2 |
| Soh, Wooi Yik | Kuala Lumpur | 0 | 0 | 2 | 2 |
| Tan, Koong Le Pearly | Kedah | 0 | 0 | 2 | 2 |
| Teoh, Mei Xing | Selangor | 0 | 0 | 2 | 2 |
| Cheah, Yee See | Penang | 0 | 0 | 1 | 1 |
| Chin, Eei Hui | Penang | 0 | 0 | 1 | 1 |
| Eoon, Qi Xuan | Perak | 0 | 0 | 1 | 1 |
| Fairuzizuan Bin Mohamad Tazari, Mohamad | Perak | 0 | 0 | 1 | 1 |
| Go, Pei Kee | Johor | 0 | 0 | 1 | 1 |
| Goh, Jin Wei | Penang | 0 | 0 | 1 | 1 |
| Goh, Liu Ying | Malacca | 0 | 0 | 1 | 1 |
| Goh, Soon Huat | Malacca | 0 | 0 | 1 | 1 |
| Hafiz Bin Hashim, Muhammad | Kelantan | 0 | 0 | 1 | 1 |
| Hoo, Kah Mun Vivian | Kuala Lumpur | 0 | 0 | 1 | 1 |
| Koo, Kien Keat | Perak | 0 | 0 | 1 | 1 |
| Kuan, Beng Hong | Kedah | 0 | 0 | 1 | 1 |
| Lai, Pei Jing | Pahang | 0 | 0 | 1 | 1 |
| Lai, Shevon Jemie | Selangor | 0 | 0 | 1 | 1 |
| Lee, Chong Wei | Perak/Penang | 0 | 0 | 1 | 1 |
| Man, Wei Chong | Malacca | 0 | 0 | 1 | 1 |
| Ng, Hui Lin | Kuala Lumpur | 0 | 0 | 1 | 1 |
| Ong, Yew Sin | Malacca | 0 | 0 | 1 | 1 |
| Peck, Yen Wei | Kuala Lumpur | 0 | 0 | 1 | 1 |
| Selvaduray, Kisona | Negeri Sembilan | 0 | 0 | 1 | 1 |
| Sholeh Bin Ali Sadikin, Aidil | Selangor | 0 | 0 | 1 | 1 |
| Siow, Zi Xuan Valeree | Perak | 0 | 0 | 1 | 1 |
| Tan, Boon Heong | Kedah | 0 | 0 | 1 | 1 |
| Tan, Chun Seang | Kedah | 0 | 0 | 1 | 1 |
| Tan, Kian Meng | Johor | 0 | 0 | 1 | 1 |
| Tee, Kai Wun | Malacca | 0 | 0 | 1 | 1 |
| Teo, Ee Yi | Johor | 0 | 0 | 1 | 1 |
| Toh, Ee Wei | Malacca | 0 | 0 | 1 | 1 |
| Wong, Mew Choo | Perak | 0 | 0 | 1 | 1 |
| Wong, Pei Tty | Perak | 0 | 0 | 1 | 1 |
| Wong, Pei Xian Julia | Malacca | 0 | 0 | 1 | 1 |
| Woon, Khe Wei Janice | Selangor | 0 | 0 | 1 | 1 |
| Yap, Ling | Malacca | 0 | 0 | 1 | 1 |
| Zakry Bin Abdul Latif, Mohamad | Negeri Sembilan | 0 | 0 | 1 | 1 |

=== Asia Team Championships ===
(Note: The badminton continental men's team championships for Asia was first played in 1962 and was rotated with the individual championships until 1993 as it was discontinued from 1994. It made a brief re-appearance in the form of the Badminton Asia Cup between 1997 and 2001 as an invitational event. In 2016, the team championships returned as two separate biennial events, men's and women's, to serve as qualifiers for the Thomas and Uber Cups. These would be rotated with a mixed team championships which, in turn, will serve as a qualifying event for the Sudirman Cup.)

| Medalists | State / Federal Territory | Asian Men's Team Championships | | | Asia Cup | | | Asia Team Championships | | | Total | | | |
| Medalists | State / Federal Territory | Gold | Silver | Bronze | Gold | Silver | Bronze | Gold | Silver | Bronze | Gold | Silver | Bronze | |
|---|---|---|---|---|---|---|---|---|---|---|---|---|---|---|
| Tan, Yee Khan | Perak | 2 | 0 | 0 | N/A | | | | | | 2 | 0 | 0 | 2 |
| Teh, Kew San | Penang | 2 | 0 | 0 | N/A | | | | | | 2 | 0 | 0 | 2 |
| Goh, Sze Fei | Malacca | N/A | | | | | | 1 | 2 | 1 | 1 | 2 | 1 | 4 |
| Izzuddin Bin Rumsani, Nur | Johor | N/A | | | | | | 1 | 2 | 1 | 1 | 2 | 1 | 4 |
| Lee, Zii Jia | Kedah | N/A | | | | | | 1 | 2 | 1 | 1 | 2 | 1 | 4 |
| Chia, Teng Fong Aaron | Malacca | N/A | | | | | | 1 | 2 | 0 | 1 | 2 | 0 | 3 |
| Ng, Tze Yong | Johor | N/A | | | | | | 1 | 2 | 0 | 1 | 2 | 0 | 3 |
| Soh, Wooi Yik | Kuala Lumpur | N/A | | | | | | 1 | 2 | 0 | 1 | 2 | 0 | 3 |
| Leong, Jun Hao | Kuala Lumpur | N/A | | | | | | 1 | 1 | 0 | 1 | 1 | 0 | 2 |
| Lim, Chong King | Kuala Lumpur | N/A | | | | | | 1 | 0 | 0 | 1 | 0 | 0 | 1 |
| Kok, Jing Hong | Kedah | N/A | | | | | | 1 | 0 | 0 | 1 | 0 | 0 | 1 |
| Man, Wei Chong | Malacca | N/A | | | | | | 1 | 0 | 0 | 1 | 0 | 0 | 1 |
| Ng, Boon Bee | Perak | 1 | 0 | 0 | N/A | | | | | | 1 | 0 | 0 | 1 |
| Ng, Seow Meng Billy | Johor | 1 | 0 | 0 | N/A | | | | | | 1 | 0 | 0 | 1 |
| Sholeh Bin Ali Sadikin, Aidil | Selangor | N/A | | | | | | 1 | 0 | 0 | 1 | 0 | 0 | 1 |
| Tee, Kai Wun | Malacca | N/A | | | | | | 1 | 0 | 0 | 1 | 0 | 0 | 1 |
| Yew, Cheng Hoe | Selangor | 1 | 0 | 0 | N/A | | | | | | 1 | 0 | 0 | 1 |
| Foo, Kok Keong | Selangor | 0 | 1 | 2 | 0 | 0 | 0 | N/A | | | 0 | 1 | 2 | 2 |
| Jalani Bin Mohamad Sidek | Selangor | 0 | 1 | 1 | N/A | | | | | | 0 | 1 | 1 | 2 |
| Ong, Yew Sin | Malacca | N/A | | | | | | 0 | 1 | 1 | 0 | 1 | 1 | 2 |
| Razif Bin Mohamad Sidek | Selangor | 0 | 1 | 1 | N/A | | | | | | 0 | 1 | 1 | 2 |
| Teo, Ee Yi | Johor | N/A | | | | | | 0 | 1 | 1 | 0 | 1 | 1 | 2 |
| Cheam, June Wei | Penang | N/A | | | | | | 0 | 1 | 0 | 0 | 1 | 0 | 1 |
| Chew, Choon Eng | Penang | N/A | | | 0 | 1 | 0 | N/A | | | 0 | 1 | 0 | 1 |
| Ismail Bin Saman | | N/A | | | 0 | 1 | 0 | N/A | | | 0 | 1 | 0 | 1 |
| Lee, Chee Leong | | N/A | | | 0 | 1 | 0 | N/A | | | 0 | 1 | 0 | 1 |
| Lee, Wan Wah | Perak | N/A | | | 0 | 1 | 0 | N/A | | | 0 | 1 | 0 | 1 |
| Leong, Jun Hao | Kuala Lumpur | N/A | | | | | | 0 | 1 | 0 | 0 | 1 | 0 | 1 |
| Misbun Bin Mohamad Sidek | Selangor | 0 | 1 | 0 | N/A | | | | | | 0 | 1 | 0 | 1 |
| Ng, Tat Wai | Penang | 0 | 1 | 0 | N/A | | | | | | 0 | 1 | 0 | 1 |
| Ong, Beng Teong | Selangor | 0 | 1 | 0 | N/A | | | | | | 0 | 1 | 0 | 1 |
| Ong, Ewe Hock | Penang | N/A | | | 0 | 1 | 0 | N/A | | | 0 | 1 | 0 | 1 |
| Pang, Chen | | N/A | | | 0 | 1 | 0 | N/A | | | 0 | 1 | 0 | 1 |
| Rahman Bin Mohamed, Abdul | | 0 | 1 | 0 | N/A | | | | | | 0 | 1 | 0 | 1 |
| Rosman Bin Abdul Razak | | N/A | | | 0 | 1 | 0 | N/A | | | 0 | 1 | 0 | 1 |
| Tan, Aik Huang | Penang | 0 | 1 | 0 | N/A | | | | | | 0 | 1 | 0 | 1 |
| Tan, Aik Mong | Penang | 0 | 1 | 0 | N/A | | | | | | 0 | 1 | 0 | 1 |
| Tan, Kim Her | | N/A | | | 0 | 1 | 0 | N/A | | | 0 | 1 | 0 | 1 |
| Wong, Choong Hann | Kuala Lumpur | N/A | | | 0 | 1 | 0 | N/A | | | 0 | 1 | 0 | 1 |
| Wong, Jee Weng Jason | | N/A | | | 0 | 1 | 0 | N/A | | | 0 | 1 | 0 | 1 |
| Choong, Hon Jian | Penang | N/A | | | | | | 0 | 1 | 0 | 0 | 1 | 0 | 1 |
| Ewe, Eon Eogene | Perak | N/A | | | | | | 0 | 1 | 0 | 0 | 1 | 0 | 1 |
| Haikal Bin Nazri, Muhammad | Kelantan | N/A | | | | | | 0 | 1 | 0 | 0 | 1 | 0 | 1 |
| Cheah, Soon Kit | Perak | 0 | 0 | 2 | 0 | 0 | 0 | N/A | | | 0 | 0 | 2 | 2 |
| Eoon, Qi Xuan | Perak | N/A | | | | | | 0 | 0 | 2 | 0 | 0 | 2 | 2 |
| Muralitharan, Thinaah | Selangor | N/A | | | | | | 0 | 0 | 2 | 0 | 0 | 2 | 2 |
| Selvaduray, Kisona | Negeri Sembilan | N/A | | | | | | 0 | 0 | 2 | 0 | 0 | 2 | 2 |
| Soo, Beng Kiang | Kedah | 0 | 0 | 2 | N/A | | | | | | 0 | 0 | 2 | 2 |
| Tan, Koong Le Pearly | Kedah | N/A | | | | | | 0 | 0 | 2 | 0 | 0 | 2 | 2 |
| Cheah, Su Ya Soniia | Kuala Lumpur | N/A | | | | | | 0 | 0 | 1 | 0 | 0 | 1 | 1 |
| Cheong, Ching Yik Anna | Malacca | N/A | | | | | | 0 | 0 | 1 | 0 | 0 | 1 | 1 |
| Chow, Mei Kuan | Malacca | N/A | | | | | | 0 | 0 | 1 | 0 | 0 | 1 | 1 |
| Go, Pei Kee | Johor | N/A | | | | | | 0 | 0 | 1 | 0 | 0 | 1 | 1 |
| Goh, Jin Wei | Penang | N/A | | | | | | 0 | 0 | 1 | 0 | 0 | 1 | 1 |
| Goh, V Shem | Kuala Lumpur | N/A | | | | | | 0 | 0 | 1 | 0 | 0 | 1 | 1 |
| Hoo, Kah Mun Vivian | Kuala Lumpur | N/A | | | | | | 0 | 0 | 1 | 0 | 0 | 1 | 1 |
| Kwan, Yoke Meng | Selangor | 0 | 0 | 1 | N/A | | | | | | 0 | 0 | 1 | 1 |
| Lee, Chong Wei | Perak/Penang | N/A | | | | | | 0 | 0 | 1 | 0 | 0 | 1 | 1 |
| Lee, Meng Yean | Malacca | N/A | | | | | | 0 | 0 | 1 | 0 | 0 | 1 | 1 |
| Low, Yeen Yuan | Negeri Sembilan | N/A | | | | | | 0 | 0 | 1 | 0 | 0 | 1 | 1 |
| Myisha Binti Mohd. Khairul | Johor | N/A | | | | | | 0 | 0 | 1 | 0 | 0 | 1 | 1 |
| Nurshuhaini Binti Azman, Siti | Selangor | N/A | | | | | | 0 | 0 | 1 | 0 | 0 | 1 | 1 |
| Ong, Ewe Chye | Penang | 0 | 0 | 1 | N/A | | | | | | 0 | 0 | 1 | 1 |
| Rashid Bin Mohamad Sidek | Selangor | 0 | 0 | 1 | 0 | 0 | 0 | N/A | | | 0 | 0 | 1 | 1 |
| Siow, Zi Xuan Valeree | Perak | N/A | | | | | | 0 | 0 | 1 | 0 | 0 | 1 | 1 |
| Soong, Joo Ven | Selangor | N/A | | | | | | 0 | 0 | 1 | 0 | 0 | 1 | 1 |
| Tan, Wee Kiong | Johor/Sabah | N/A | | | | | | 0 | 0 | 1 | 0 | 0 | 1 | 1 |
| Tan, Zhing Yi | Penang | N/A | | | | | | 0 | 0 | 1 | 0 | 0 | 1 | 1 |
| Teoh, Mei Xing | Selangor | N/A | | | | | | 0 | 0 | 1 | 0 | 0 | 1 | 1 |
| Wong, Tat Meng | Kedah | 0 | 0 | 1 | N/A | | | | | | 0 | 0 | 1 | 1 |
| Yap, Cheng Wen | Malacca | N/A | | | | | | 0 | 0 | 1 | 0 | 0 | 1 | 1 |
| Zulkarnain Bin Zainuddin, Iskandar | Kuala Lumpur | N/A | | | | | | 0 | 0 | 1 | 0 | 0 | 1 | 1 |

=== Asia Mixed Team Championships ===
(Note: The Malaysia national badminton team has never reached the medal rounds of the Asia Mixed Team Championships since the inception of the event, reaching the quarter-final stage in both editions thus far.)

== Continental championships ==
=== World Badminton Championships ===
(Note: The first official badminton world championships only began in 1977 as the IBF World Championships. An annual invitational event known as the World Invitational Championships was held as the sport's unofficial world championships between 1954 and 1975. From 1979 to 1997 and 2005 to 2006, the World Cup, an invitational event organised by the International Management Group (IMG) was also held.)

| Medalists | State / Federal Territory | Singles | | | Doubles | | | Mixed Doubles | | | Total | | | | | |
| Medalists | State / Federal Territory | Gold | Silver | Bronze | Gold | Silver | Bronze | Gold | Silver | Bronze | Gold | Silver | Bronze | | | |
|---|---|---|---|---|---|---|---|---|---|---|---|---|---|---|---|---|
| Medalists | State / Federal Territory | Jalani Bin Mohamad Sidek | Selangor | 0 | 0 | 0 | 2 | 2 | 6 | 0 | 0 | 0 | 2 | 2 | 6 | 10 (Note: Count includes medal(s) won at the invitational World Cup.) |
| Razif Bin Mohamad Sidek | Selangor | 0 | 0 | 0 | 2 | 2 | 5 | 0 | 0 | 0 | 2 | 2 | 5 | 9 | | |
| Cheah, Soon Kit | Perak | 0 | 0 | 0 | 2 | 2 | 4 | 0 | 0 | 0 | 2 | 2 | 4 | 8 | | |
| Soo, Beng Kiang | Kedah | 0 | 0 | 0 | 2 | 1 | 1 | 0 | 0 | 0 | 2 | 1 | 1 | 4 | | |
| Choong, Ewe Beng "Eddy" | Penang | 2 | 0 | 0 | 0 | 0 | 0 | 0 | 0 | 0 | 2 | 0 | 0 | 2 (Note: Count includes medal(s) won at the invitational World Invitational Championships.) | | |
| Ng, Boon Bee | Perak | 0 | 0 | 0 | 2 | 0 | 0 | 0 | 0 | 0 | 2 | 0 | 0 | 2 | | |
| Tan, Aik Huang | Penang | 2 | 0 | 0 | 0 | 0 | 0 | 0 | 0 | 0 | 2 | 0 | 0 | 2 | | |
| Tan, Yee Khan | Perak | 0 | 0 | 0 | 2 | 0 | 0 | 0 | 0 | 0 | 2 | 0 | 0 | 2 | | |
| Chia, Teng Fong Aaron | Malacca | 0 | 0 | 0 | 1 | 1 | 1 | 0 | 0 | 0 | 1 | 1 | 1 | 3 | | |
| Soh, Wooi Yik | Kuala Lumpur | 0 | 0 | 0 | 1 | 1 | 1 | 0 | 0 | 0 | 1 | 1 | 1 | 3 | | |
| Chen, Tang Jie | Perak | 0 | 0 | 0 | 0 | 0 | 0 | 1 | 0 | 0 | 1 | 0 | 0 | 1 | | |
| Lim, Say Hup | Penang | 0 | 0 | 0 | 1 | 0 | 0 | 0 | 0 | 0 | 1 | 0 | 0 | 1 | | |
| Ong, Poh Lim | Sarawak/ Singapore | 0 | 0 | 0 | 1 | 0 | 0 | 0 | 0 | 0 | 1 | 0 | 0 | 1 | | |
| Ooi, Teik Hock | Penang | 0 | 0 | 0 | 1 | 0 | 0 | 0 | 0 | 0 | 1 | 0 | 0 | 1 | | |
| Teh, Kew San | Penang | 0 | 0 | 0 | 1 | 0 | 0 | 0 | 0 | 0 | 1 | 0 | 0 | 1 | | |
| Toh, Ee Wei | Malacca | 0 | 0 | 0 | 0 | 0 | 0 | 1 | 0 | 0 | 1 | 0 | 0 | 1 | | |
| Lee, Chong Wei | Perak/Penang | 0 | 4 | 1 | 0 | 0 | 0 | 0 | 0 | 0 | 0 | 4 | 1 | 5 | | |
| Yap, Kim Hock | Johor | 0 | 0 | 0 | 0 | 1 | 4 | 0 | 0 | 0 | 0 | 1 | 4 | 5 | | |
| Koo, Kien Keat | Perak | 0 | 0 | 0 | 0 | 1 | 2 | 0 | 0 | 1 | 0 | 1 | 3 | 4 | | |
| Misbun Bin Mohamad Sidek | Selangor | 0 | 1 | 2 | 0 | 0 | 1 | 0 | 0 | 0 | 0 | 1 | 3 | 4 | | |
| Fairuzizuan Bin Mohamad Tazari, Mohamad | Perak | 0 | 0 | 0 | 0 | 1 | 1 | 0 | 0 | 0 | 0 | 1 | 1 | 2 | | |
| Foo, Kok Keong | Selangor | 0 | 1 | 1 | 0 | 0 | 0 | 0 | 0 | 0 | 0 | 1 | 1 | 2 | | |
| Tan, Boon Heong | Kedah | 0 | 0 | 0 | 0 | 1 | 1 | 0 | 0 | 0 | 0 | 1 | 1 | 2 | | |
| Lin, Woon Fui Robert | Kuala Lumpur | 0 | 0 | 0 | 0 | 1 | 0 | 0 | 0 | 0 | 0 | 1 | 0 | 1 | | |
| Muralitharan, Thinaah | Selangor | 0 | 0 | 0 | 0 | 1 | 0 | 0 | 0 | 0 | 0 | 1 | 0 | 1 | | |
| Tan, Koong Le Pearly | Kedah | 0 | 0 | 0 | 0 | 1 | 0 | 0 | 0 | 0 | 0 | 1 | 0 | 1 | | |
| Wong, Choong Hann | Kuala Lumpur | 0 | 1 | 0 | 0 | 0 | 0 | 0 | 0 | 0 | 0 | 1 | 0 | 1 | | |
| Choong, Tan Fook | Perak | 0 | 0 | 0 | 0 | 0 | 3 | 0 | 0 | 0 | 0 | 0 | 3 | 3 | | |
| Lee, Wan Wah | Perak | 0 | 0 | 0 | 0 | 0 | 3 | 0 | 0 | 0 | 0 | 0 | 3 | 3 | | |
| Chan, Chong Ming | Selangor | 0 | 0 | 0 | 0 | 0 | 2 | 0 | 0 | 0 | 0 | 0 | 2 | 2 | | |
| Wong, Pei Tty | Perak | 0 | 0 | 0 | 0 | 0 | 1 | 0 | 0 | 1 | 0 | 0 | 2 | 2 | | |
| Chew, Choon Eng | Penang | 0 | 0 | 0 | 0 | 0 | 1 | 0 | 0 | 0 | 0 | 0 | 1 | 1 | | |
| Chin, Eei Hui | Penang | 0 | 0 | 0 | 0 | 0 | 1 | 0 | 0 | 0 | 0 | 0 | 1 | 1 | | |
| Liew, Daren | Kuala Lumpur | 0 | 0 | 1 | 0 | 0 | 0 | 0 | 0 | 0 | 0 | 0 | 1 | 1 | | |
| Ong, Ewe Hock | Penang | 0 | 0 | 1 | 0 | 0 | 0 | 0 | 0 | 0 | 0 | 0 | 1 | 1 | | |
| Ong, Yew Sin | Malacca | 0 | 0 | 0 | 0 | 0 | 1 | 0 | 0 | 0 | 0 | 0 | 1 | 1 | | |
| Rashid Bin Mohamad Sidek | Selangor | 0 | 0 | 1 | 0 | 0 | 0 | 0 | 0 | 0 | 0 | 0 | 1 | 1 | | |
| Tan, Kim Her | | 0 | 0 | 0 | 0 | 0 | 1 | 0 | 0 | 0 | 0 | 0 | 1 | 1 | | |
| Teo, Ee Yi | Johor | 0 | 0 | 0 | 0 | 0 | 1 | 0 | 0 | 0 | 0 | 0 | 1 | 1 | | |
| Yap, Yee Guan | | 0 | 0 | 0 | 0 | 0 | 1 | 0 | 0 | 0 | 0 | 0 | 1 | 1 | | |
| Yap, Yee Hup | | 0 | 0 | 0 | 0 | 0 | 1 | 0 | 0 | 0 | 0 | 0 | 1 | 1 | | |
| Zakry Bin Abdul Latif, Mohamad | Negeri Sembilan | 0 | 0 | 0 | 0 | 0 | 1 | 0 | 0 | 0 | 0 | 0 | 1 | 1 | | |

=== Asia Badminton Championships ===
(Note: The badminton continental individual championships for Asia was first played in 1962 and was held in erratic years until 1991, when it became an annual event. In addition to the championships, a short-lived invitational Badminton Asian Cup took place for four editions (1991, 1994–1996).)

| Medalists | State / Federal Territory | Singles | | | Doubles | | | Mixed Doubles | | | Total | | | | | |
| Medalists | State / Federal Territory | Gold | Silver | Bronze | Gold | Silver | Bronze | Gold | Silver | Bronze | Gold | Silver | Bronze | | | |
|---|---|---|---|---|---|---|---|---|---|---|---|---|---|---|---|---|
| Medalists | State / Federal Territory | Rashid Bin Mohamad Sidek | Selangor | 4 | 0 | 0 | 0 | 0 | 0 | 0 | 0 | 0 | 4 | 0 | 0 | 4 (Note: Count includes medal(s) won at the invitational Asian Cup.) |
| Cheah, Soon Kit | Perak | 0 | 0 | 0 | 2 | 2 | 2 | 0 | 0 | 0 | 2 | 2 | 2 | 6 | | |
| Choong, Tan Fook | Perak | 0 | 0 | 0 | 2 | 2 | 0 | 0 | 0 | 0 | 2 | 2 | 0 | 4 | | |
| Lee, Wan Wah | Perak | 0 | 0 | 0 | 2 | 2 | 0 | 0 | 0 | 0 | 2 | 2 | 0 | 4 | | |
| Tan, Yee Khan | Perak | 0 | 0 | 1 | 1 | 1 | 0 | 1 | 0 | 0 | 2 | 1 | 1 | 4 | | |
| Lee, Chong Wei | Perak/Penang | 2 | 0 | 2 | 0 | 0 | 0 | 0 | 0 | 0 | 2 | 0 | 2 | 4 | | |
| Ng, Boon Bee | Perak | 0 | 0 | 0 | 2 | 0 | 0 | 0 | 0 | 0 | 2 | 0 | 0 | 2 | | |
| Foo, Kok Keong | Selangor | 1 | 3 | 0 | 0 | 0 | 0 | 0 | 0 | 0 | 1 | 3 | 0 | 4 | | |
| Yap, Kim Hock | Johor | 0 | 0 | 0 | 1 | 2 | 2 | 0 | 0 | 0 | 1 | 2 | 2 | 5 | | |
| Ang, Rosalind Singha | Kedah | 0 | 0 | 0 | 1 | 1 | 1 | 0 | 0 | 0 | 1 | 1 | 1 | 3 | | |
| Jalani Bin Mohamad Sidek | Selangor | 0 | 0 | 0 | 1 | 1 | 1 | 0 | 0 | 0 | 1 | 1 | 1 | 3 | | |
| Razif Bin Mohamad Sidek | Selangor | 0 | 0 | 0 | 1 | 1 | 1 | 0 | 0 | 0 | 1 | 1 | 1 | 3 | | |
| Soo, Beng Kiang | Kedah | 0 | 0 | 0 | 1 | 1 | 1 | 0 | 0 | 0 | 1 | 1 | 1 | 3 | | |
| Chia, Teng Fong Aaron | Malacca | 0 | 0 | 0 | 1 | 1 | 1 | 0 | 0 | 0 | 1 | 1 | 1 | 3 | | |
| Soh, Wooi Yik | Kuala Lumpur | 0 | 0 | 0 | 1 | 1 | 1 | 0 | 0 | 0 | 1 | 1 | 1 | 3 | | |
| Gunalan, Punch | Selangor | 0 | 1 | 0 | 1 | 0 | 0 | 0 | 0 | 0 | 1 | 1 | 0 | 2 | | |
| Lim, Say Hup | Penang | 0 | 0 | 0 | 0 | 1 | 0 | 1 | 0 | 0 | 1 | 1 | 0 | 2 | | |
| Teh, Kew San | Penang | 1 | 0 | 0 | 0 | 1 | 0 | 0 | 0 | 0 | 1 | 1 | 0 | 2 | | |
| Ng, Meow Eng Sylvia | Johor | 0 | 0 | 1 | 1 | 0 | 1 | 0 | 0 | 0 | 1 | 0 | 2 | 3 | | |
| Teh née Ng, Mei Ling | Penang | 0 | 0 | 0 | 0 | 0 | 1 | 1 | 0 | 0 | 1 | 0 | 1 | 2 | | |
| Chan, Peng Soon | Penang | 0 | 0 | 0 | 0 | 0 | 0 | 1 | 0 | 0 | 1 | 0 | 0 | 1 | | |
| Goh, Liu Ying | Malacca | 0 | 0 | 0 | 0 | 0 | 0 | 1 | 0 | 0 | 1 | 0 | 0 | 1 | | |
| Lee, Zii Jia | Kedah | 1 | 0 | 0 | 0 | 0 | 0 | 0 | 0 | 0 | 1 | 0 | 0 | 1 | | |
| Tan, Aik Mong | Penang | 1 | 0 | 0 | 0 | 0 | 0 | 0 | 0 | 0 | 1 | 0 | 0 | 1 | | |
| Tan, Boon Heong | Kedah | 0 | 0 | 0 | 0 | 2 | 1 | 0 | 0 | 0 | 0 | 2 | 1 | 3 | | |
| Tan, Kim Her | | 0 | 0 | 0 | 0 | 1 | 1 | 0 | 0 | 2 | 0 | 1 | 3 | 4 | | |
| Koo, Kien Keat | Perak | 0 | 0 | 0 | 0 | 1 | 1 | 0 | 0 | 0 | 0 | 1 | 1 | 2 | | |
| Ong, Ewe Hock | Penang | 0 | 1 | 1 | 0 | 0 | 0 | 0 | 0 | 0 | 0 | 1 | 1 | 2 | | |
| Goh, Sze Fei | Malacca | 0 | 0 | 0 | 0 | 1 | 1 | 0 | 0 | 0 | 0 | 1 | 1 | 2 | | |
| Izzuddin Bin Rumsani, Nur | Johor | 0 | 0 | 0 | 0 | 1 | 1 | 0 | 0 | 0 | 0 | 1 | 1 | 2 | | |
| Hoo, Kah Mun Vivian | Kuala Lumpur | 0 | 0 | 0 | 0 | 1 | 0 | 0 | 0 | 0 | 0 | 1 | 0 | 1 | | |
| Hoon, Thien How | Kuala Lumpur | 0 | 0 | 0 | 0 | 1 | 0 | 0 | 0 | 0 | 0 | 1 | 0 | 1 | | |
| Kuan, Beng Hong | Kedah | 0 | 1 | 0 | 0 | 0 | 0 | 0 | 0 | 0 | 0 | 1 | 0 | 1 | | |
| Ng, Seow Meng Billy | Johor | 0 | 1 | 0 | 0 | 0 | 0 | 0 | 0 | 0 | 0 | 1 | 0 | 1 | | |
| Ong, Yew Sin | Malacca | 0 | 0 | 0 | 0 | 1 | 0 | 0 | 0 | 0 | 0 | 1 | 0 | 1 | | |
| Teo, Ee Yi | Johor | 0 | 0 | 0 | 0 | 1 | 0 | 0 | 0 | 0 | 0 | 1 | 0 | 1 | | |
| Teoh, Siew Yong | Kedah | 0 | 0 | 0 | 0 | 1 | 0 | 0 | 0 | 0 | 0 | 1 | 0 | 1 | | |
| Woon Khe Wei Janice | Selangor | 0 | 0 | 0 | 0 | 1 | 0 | 0 | 0 | 0 | 0 | 1 | 0 | 1 | | |
| Tan, Sui Hoon | Penang | 0 | 0 | 0 | 0 | 0 | 1 | 0 | 0 | 2 | 0 | 0 | 3 | 3 | | |
| Chew, Choon Eng | Penang | 0 | 0 | 0 | 0 | 0 | 2 | 0 | 0 | 0 | 0 | 0 | 2 | 2 | | |
| Fairuzizuan Bin Mohamad Tazari, Mohamad | Perak | 0 | 0 | 0 | 0 | 0 | 1 | 0 | 0 | 1 | 0 | 0 | 2 | 2 | | |
| Ong, Ewe Chye | Penang | 0 | 0 | 0 | 0 | 0 | 1 | 0 | 0 | 0 | 0 | 0 | 2 | 2 | | |
| Tan, Lee Wai | | 0 | 0 | 0 | 0 | 0 | 1 | 0 | 0 | 1 | 0 | 0 | 2 | 2 | | |
| Wong, Pei Tty | Perak | 0 | 0 | 0 | 0 | 0 | 1 | 0 | 0 | 1 | 0 | 0 | 2 | 2 | | |
| Chan, Chong Ming | Selangor | 0 | 0 | 0 | 0 | 0 | 1 | 0 | 0 | 0 | 0 | 0 | 1 | 1 | | |
| Chin, Eei Hui | Penang | 0 | 0 | 0 | 0 | 0 | 1 | 0 | 0 | 0 | 0 | 0 | 1 | 1 | | |
| Chong, Wei Feng | Kedah | 0 | 0 | 1 | 0 | 0 | 0 | 0 | 0 | 0 | 0 | 0 | 1 | 1 | | |
| Goh, Soon Huat | Malacca | 0 | 0 | 0 | 0 | 0 | 0 | 0 | 0 | 1 | 0 | 0 | 1 | 1 | | |
| Goh, V Shem | Kuala Lumpur | 0 | 0 | 0 | 0 | 0 | 1 | 0 | 0 | 0 | 0 | 0 | 1 | 1 | | |
| Lai, Shevon Jemie | Selangor | 0 | 0 | 0 | 0 | 0 | 0 | 0 | 0 | 1 | 0 | 0 | 1 | 1 | | |
| Lee, Chee Leong | | 0 | 0 | 0 | 0 | 0 | 1 | 0 | 0 | 0 | 0 | 0 | 1 | 1 | | |
| Lim, Khim Wah | Penang | 0 | 0 | 0 | 0 | 0 | 1 | 0 | 0 | 0 | 0 | 0 | 1 | 1 | | |
| Lim, Pek Siah | | 0 | 0 | 0 | 0 | 0 | 1 | 0 | 0 | 0 | 0 | 0 | 1 | 1 | | |
| Misbun Bin Mohamad Sidek | Selangor | 0 | 0 | 1 | 0 | 0 | 0 | 0 | 0 | 0 | 0 | 0 | 1 | 1 | | |
| Moey, Sam Kooi Jean | Selangor | 0 | 0 | 0 | 0 | 0 | 1 | 0 | 0 | 0 | 0 | 0 | 1 | 1 | | |
| Ong, Soon Hock | Selangor | 0 | 0 | 0 | 0 | 0 | 1 | 0 | 0 | 0 | 0 | 0 | 1 | 1 | | |
| Quay, Swee Ling Joanne | | 0 | 0 | 0 | 0 | 0 | 1 | 0 | 0 | 0 | 0 | 0 | 1 | 1 | | |
| Rahman Bin Mohamad Sidek | Selangor | 0 | 0 | 0 | 0 | 0 | 1 | 0 | 0 | 0 | 0 | 0 | 1 | 1 | | |
| Tan, Bin Shen | Selangor | 0 | 0 | 0 | 0 | 0 | 1 | 0 | 0 | 0 | 0 | 0 | 1 | 1 | | |
| Wong, Mew Choo | Perak | 0 | 0 | 1 | 0 | 0 | 0 | 0 | 0 | 0 | 0 | 0 | 1 | 1 | | |
| Yeoh, Kay Bin | Perak | 0 | 0 | 1 | 0 | 0 | 0 | 0 | 0 | 0 | 0 | 0 | 1 | 1 | | |
| Yew, Cheng Hoe | Selangor | 0 | 0 | 1 | 0 | 0 | 0 | 0 | 0 | 0 | 0 | 0 | 1 | 1 | | |
| Zakry Bin Abdul Latif, Mohamad | Negeri Sembilan | 0 | 0 | 0 | 0 | 0 | 1 | 0 | 0 | 0 | 0 | 0 | 1 | 1 | | |

== Major tournaments ==
=== Season-ending Championships ===
(Note: The season-ending championships has gone through three iterations thus far, beginning with the Grand Prix Finals (1983–2000). The event did not appear on the badminton calendar again until its return as the Super Series Finals (2008–2017) before being renamed to its current form as the World Tour Finals (2018–present).)

| Medalists | State / Federal Territory | Singles | | Doubles | | Mixed Doubles | | Total | | |
| Medalists | State / Federal Territory | Winner | Runner-up | Winner | Runner-up | Winner | Runner-up | Winner | Runner-up | |
|---|---|---|---|---|---|---|---|---|---|---|
| Lee, Chong Wei | Perak/Penang | 4 | 1 | 0 | 0 | 0 | 0 | 4 | 1 | 5 |
| Jalani Bin Mohamad Sidek | Selangor | 0 | 0 | 4 | 0 | 0 | 0 | 4 | 0 | 4 |
| Razif Bin Mohamad Sidek | Selangor | 0 | 0 | 4 | 0 | 0 | 0 | 4 | 0 | 4 |
| Chin, Eei Hui | Penang | 0 | 0 | 2 | 0 | 0 | 0 | 2 | 0 | 2 |
| Wong, Pei Tty | Perak | 0 | 0 | 2 | 0 | 0 | 0 | 2 | 0 | 2 |
| Cheah, Soon Kit | Perak | 0 | 0 | 1 | 4 | 0 | 0 | 1 | 4 | 5 |
| Yap, Kim Hock | Johor | 0 | 0 | 1 | 2 | 0 | 0 | 1 | 2 | 3 |
| Rashid Bin Mohamad Sidek | Selangor | 1 | 1 | 0 | 0 | 0 | 0 | 1 | 1 | 2 |
| Goh, V Shem | Kuala Lumpur | 0 | 0 | 1 | 0 | 0 | 0 | 1 | 0 | 1 |
| Koo, Kien Keat | Perak | 0 | 0 | 1 | 0 | 0 | 0 | 1 | 0 | 1 |
| Tan, Boon Heong | Kedah | 0 | 0 | 1 | 0 | 0 | 0 | 1 | 0 | 1 |
| Tan, Wee Kiong | Johor/Sabah | 0 | 0 | 1 | 0 | 0 | 0 | 1 | 0 | 1 |
| Wong, Mew Choo | Perak | 1 | 0 | 0 | 0 | 0 | 0 | 1 | 0 | 1 |
| Soo, Beng Kiang | Kedah | 0 | 0 | 0 | 2 | 0 | 0 | 0 | 2 | 2 |
| Foo, Kok Keong | Selangor | 0 | 1 | 0 | 0 | 0 | 0 | 0 | 1 | 1 |
| Chen, Tang Jie | Negeri Sembilan | 0 | 0 | 0 | 0 | 0 | 1 | 0 | 1 | 1 |
| Goh, Sze Fei | Malacca | 0 | 0 | 0 | 1 | 0 | 0 | 0 | 1 | 1 |
| Izzuddin Bin Rumsani, Nur | Johor | 0 | 0 | 0 | 1 | 0 | 0 | 0 | 1 | 1 |
| Toh, Ee Wei | Malacca | 0 | 0 | 0 | 0 | 0 | 1 | 0 | 1 | 1 |

=== All England Open Badminton Championships ===
(Note: Goh Liu Ying is the first and only Malaysian female shuttler to date to reach the final of the All England Open Badminton Championships when she did so in the mixed doubles discipline of the 2017 edition. The only other time Malaysia had a representative in the mixed doubles final was through David E. L. Choong, who partnered June White, an English shuttler. As such, there are no Malaysian finalists in the women's singles and doubles disciplines in the list.)

| Medalists | State / Federal Territory | Singles | | Doubles | | Mixed Doubles | | Total | | |
| Medalists | State / Federal Territory | Winner | Runner-up | Winner | Runner-up | Winner | Runner-up | Winner | Runner-up | |
|---|---|---|---|---|---|---|---|---|---|---|
| Choong, Ewe Beng "Eddy" | Penang | 4 | 2 | 3 | 3 | 0 | 0 | 7 | 5 | 12 |
| Choong, Ewe Leong "David" | Penang | 0 | 0 | 3 | 3 | 1 | 1 | 4 | 4 | 8 |
| Lee, Chong Wei | Perak/Penang | 4 | 3 | 0 | 0 | 0 | 0 | 4 | 3 | 7 |
| Wong, Peng Soon | Johor/ Singapore | 4 | 0 | 0 | 0 | 0 | 0 | 4 | 0 | 4 |
| Ng, Boon Bee | Perak | 0 | 0 | 3 | 1 | 0 | 0 | 3 | 1 | 4 |
| Ooi, Teik Hock | Penang | 0 | 1 | 2 | 0 | 0 | 0 | 2 | 1 | 3 |
| Tan, Yee Khan | Perak | 0 | 0 | 2 | 1 | 0 | 0 | 2 | 1 | 3 |
| Tan, Aik Huang | Penang | 1 | 3 | 0 | 0 | 0 | 0 | 1 | 3 | 4 |
| Jalani Bin Mohamad Sidek | Selangor | 0 | 0 | 1 | 2 | 0 | 0 | 1 | 2 | 3 |
| Ong, Poh Lim | Sarawak/ Singapore | 0 | 1 | 1 | 1 | 0 | 0 | 1 | 2 | 3 |
| Razif Bin Mohamad Sidek | Selangor | 0 | 0 | 1 | 2 | 0 | 0 | 1 | 2 | 3 |
| Gunalan, Punch | Selangor | 0 | 1 | 1 | 0 | 0 | 0 | 1 | 1 | 2 |
| Heah, Hock Aun "Johnny" | Penang | 0 | 1 | 1 | 0 | 0 | 0 | 1 | 1 | 2 |
| Koo, Kien Keat | Perak | 0 | 0 | 1 | 1 | 0 | 0 | 1 | 1 | 2 |
| Lim, Say Hup | Penang | 0 | 0 | 1 | 1 | 0 | 0 | 1 | 1 | 2 |
| Tan, Boon Heong | Kedah | 0 | 0 | 1 | 1 | 0 | 0 | 1 | 1 | 2 |
| Teh, Kew San | Penang | 0 | 0 | 1 | 1 | 0 | 0 | 1 | 1 | 2 |
| Hafiz Bin Hashim, Muhammad | Kelantan | 1 | 0 | 0 | 0 | 0 | 0 | 1 | 0 | 1 |
| Lee, Zii Jia | Kedah | 1 | 0 | 0 | 0 | 0 | 0 | 1 | 0 | 1 |
| Teoh, Seng Khoon | Perak | 0 | 0 | 1 | 0 | 0 | 0 | 1 | 0 | 1 |
| Choong, Tan Fook | Perak | 0 | 0 | 0 | 2 | 0 | 0 | 0 | 2 | 2 |
| Lee, Wan Wah | Perak | 0 | 0 | 0 | 2 | 0 | 0 | 0 | 2 | 2 |
| Chan, Peng Soon | Penang | 0 | 0 | 0 | 0 | 0 | 1 | 0 | 1 | 1 |
| Cheah, Soon Kit | Perak | 0 | 0 | 0 | 1 | 0 | 0 | 0 | 1 | 1 |
| Chia, Teng Fong Aaron | Malacca | 0 | 0 | 0 | 1 | 0 | 0 | 0 | 1 | 1 |
| Foo, Kok Keong | Selangor | 0 | 1 | 0 | 0 | 0 | 0 | 0 | 1 | 1 |
| Goh, Liu Ying | Malacca | 0 | 0 | 0 | 0 | 0 | 1 | 0 | 1 | 1 |
| Ismail Bin Marjan | Singapore | 0 | 0 | 0 | 1 | 0 | 0 | 0 | 1 | 1 |
| Misbun Bin Mohamad Sidek | Selangor | 0 | 1 | 0 | 0 | 0 | 0 | 0 | 1 | 1 |
| Ong, Ewe Hock | Penang | 0 | 1 | 0 | 0 | 0 | 0 | 0 | 1 | 1 |
| Oon, Chong Jin Gabriel | Selangor | 0 | 0 | 0 | 1 | 0 | 0 | 0 | 1 | 1 |
| Rashid Bin Mohamad Sidek | Selangor | 0 | 1 | 0 | 0 | 0 | 0 | 0 | 1 | 1 |
| Soh, Wooi Yik | Kuala Lumpur | 0 | 0 | 0 | 1 | 0 | 0 | 0 | 1 | 1 |
| Yap, Kim Hock | Johor | 0 | 0 | 0 | 1 | 0 | 0 | 0 | 1 | 1 |
