= All Japan Members Badminton Championships =

Badminton championships

- Official website
- Founded: 1958; 68 years ago
- Editions: 69th (2026)
- Location: Takamatsu, Kagawa Prefecture; Japan
- Venue: (1) Anabuki Arena Kagawa (2) Takamatsu City General Gymnasium

The All Japan Members Badminton Championships or All Japan Society Badminton Championships (Japanese: 全日本社会人バドミントン選手権大会) is a national badminton tournament organized by the Nippon Badminton Association. The first All Japan Members Badminton Championships was founded in 1958 and has been held every September since then. The tournament is open to all those who have left their student status and have entered the social work world.

Players with outstanding performance in each event will be eligible to participate in the annual All Japan Badminton Championships.

In May 2026, the BAJ changed the tournament's scoring format to a "3 games of 15 points" system. Following the Badminton World Federation's (BWF) decision to adopt this new system for international competitions beginning in January 2027, the BAJ implemented the rule a year early across its domestic Category 1 tournaments, which includes the All Japan Members Championships. The association stated that the accelerated timeline was intended to prepare players for the upcoming 2028 Los Angeles Olympics qualification race, as well as to mitigate nationwide issues regarding lengthy match times.

== Past winners ==
| Year | Ed. | Host city | Men's singles | Women's singles | Men's doubles | Women's doubles | Mixed doubles |
|---|---|---|---|---|---|---|---|
| 1991 | 34 | Shinjō | Hiroki Etō | Haruko Yachi | Shūji Matsuno; Shinji Matsuura | Harumi Kōhara; Yoshiko Tago | No Competition |
| 1992 | 35 | Sakaide | Fumihiko Machida | Aiko Miyamura | Shūji Matsuno; Shinji Matsuura | Haruko Matsuda; Aiko Miyamura | No Competition |
| 1993 | 36 | Ōbu | Fumihiko Machida | Kazue Kanai | Fumihiko Machida; Koji Miya | Yoshiko Iwata; Fujimi Tamura | No Competition |
| 1994 | 37 | Shirakawa | Takahiro Suka | Takako Ida | Takuya Katayama; Yuzo Kubota | Aiko Miyamura; Akiko Miyamura | No Competition |
| 1995 | 38 | Mihara | Takahiro Suka | Hisako Mizui | Koji Miya; Eiji Takahashi | Aiko Miyamura; Akiko Miyamura | Hiroshi Yoshitake; Fujimi Tamura |
| 1996 | 39 | Daitō | Kazuhiro Shimogami | Takako Ida | Shinji Ohta; Takuya Takehana | Aiko Miyamura; Akiko Miyamura | Shuji Matsuno; Yoshiko Tago (Yonekura) |
| 1997 | 40 | Yamato | Kazuhiro Shimogami | Yasuko Mizui | Norio Imai; Hiroshi Ohyama | Takae Masumo; Chikako Nakayama | Fumitake Shimizu; Fujimi Tamura |
| 1998 | 41 | Yatsushiro | Fumihiko Machida | Yasuko Mizui | Shinji Ohta; Takuya Takehana | Naomi Murakami; Hiromi Yamada | Fumitake Shimizu; Fujimi Tamura |
| 1999 | 42 | Takaoka | Takaaki Taniuchi | Kanako Yonekura | Takaaki Hayashi; Katsuya Nishiyama | Yoshiko Iwata; Haruko Matsuda | Norio Imai; Keiko Yoshitomi |
| 2000 | 43 | Shiogama | Josemari Fujimoto | Miho Tanaka | Takuya Katayama; Yuzo Kubota | Kaori Mori; Megumi Oniike | Norio Imai; Chikako Nakayama |
| 2001 | 44 | Nankoku | Hidetaka Yamada | Kaori Mori | Keita Masuda; Tadashi Ōtsuka | Seiko Yamada; Shizuka Yamamoto | Norio Imai; Chikako Nakayama |
| 2002 | 45 | Komaki | Hidetaka Yamada | Kanako Yonekura | Keita Masuda; Tadashi Ōtsuka | Chikako Nakayama; Keiko Yoshitomi | Tadashi Ōtsuka; Shizuka Yamamoto |
| 2003 | 46 | Kasukabe, Satte | Josemari Fujimoto | Yoshimi Hataya | Shuichi Nakao; Shuichi Sakamoto | Aki Akao; Tomomi Matsuda | Shuichi Sakamoto; Noriko Okuma |
| 2004 | 47 | Hiroshima | Shōji Satō | Kanako Yonekura | Tsuyoshi Fukui; Shintaro Ikeda | Kumiko Ogura; Reiko Shiota | Tadashi Ōtsuka; Shizuka Yamamoto |
| 2005 | 48 | Tokyo | Yuichi Ikeda | Eriko Hirose | Keita Masuda; Tadashi Ōtsuka | Kumiko Ogura; Reiko Shiota | Keita Masuda; Miyuki Maeda |
| 2006 | 49 | Kanazawa | Yuichi Ikeda | Ai Goto | Tōru Matsumoto; Koichi Saeki | Noriko Okuma; Miyuki Tai | Tōru Matsumoto; Miyuki Tai |
| 2007 | 50 | Tottori | Yuichi Ikeda | Kaori Imabeppu | Noriyasu Hirata; Takao Yone | Ikue Tatani; Aya Wakisaka | Tōru Matsumoto; Miyuki Tai |
| 2008 | 51 | Aizuwakamatsu | Sho Sasaki | Masayo Nojirino | Yoshiteru Hirobe; Hajime Komiyama | Aki Akao; Tomomi Matsuda | Noriyasu Hirata; Shizuka Matsuo |
| 2009 | 52 | Chiba | Shōji Satō | Ai Goto | Kenichi Hayakawa; Kenta Kazuno | Miyuki Maeda; Satoko Suetsuna | Shintaro Ikeda; Reiko Shiota |
| 2010 | 53 | Hiroshima | Sho Sasaki | Megumi Taruno | Hiroyuki Endo; Kenichi Hayakawa | Misaki Matsutomo; Ayaka Takahashi | Naoki Kawamae; Miyuki Tai |
| 2011 | 54 | Ichinomiya | Kazuteru Kozai | Sayaka Takahashi | Hikaru Komachiya; Daisuke Suzuki | Yasuyo Imabeppu; Atsuko Koike | Yuya Komatsuzaki; Misato Aratama |
| 2012 | 55 | Asahikawa | Jun Takemura | Yui Hashimoto | Takeshi Kamura; Keigo Sonoda | Misaki Matsutomo; Ayaka Takahashi | Kenta Kazuno; Manami Ebuchi |
| 2013 | 56 | Osaka | Kento Momota | Sayaka Takahashi | Hirokatsu Hashimoto; Noriyasu Hirata | Misaki Matsutomo; Ayaka Takahashi | Kenichi Hayakawa; Misaki Matsutomo |
| 2014 | 57 | Koriyama | Kazumasa Sakai | Yui Hashimoto | Takuto Inoue; Yuki Kaneko | Mami Naito; Shizuka Matsuo | Ryota Taohata; Ayane Kurihara |
| 2015 | 58 | Kitakyushu | Kazumasa Sakai | Sayaka Sato | Takuro Hoki; Yugo Kobayashi | Naoko Fukuman; Kurumi Yonao | Keigo Sonoda; Naoko Fukuman |
| 2016 | 59 | Ichinomiya | Kazumasa Sakai | Haruko Suzuki | Hiroyuki Endo; Yuta Watanabe | Yuki Fukushima; Sayaka Hirota | Yuta Watanabe; Arisa Higashino |
| 2017 | 60 | Hiroshima | Kento Momota | Ayumi Mine | Hirokatsu Hashimoto; Hiroyuki Saeki | Nami Matsuyama; Chiharu Shida | Tomoya Takashina; Rie Eto |
| 2018 | 61 | Nankoku | Takuma Ueda | Haruko Suzuki | Takuro Hoki; Yugo Kobayashi | Nami Matsuyama; Chiharu Shida | Yugo Kobayashi; Chiharu Shida |
| 2019 | 62 | Fukuoka | Minoru Koga | Natsumi Shimoda | Takano Masato; Katsuki Tamate | Rena Miyaura; Kurumi Yonao | Yujiro Nishikawa; Saori Ozaki |
| 2020 | 63 | Sendai | Cancelled | | | | |
| 2021 | 64 | Tottori | Cancelled | | | | |
| 2022 | 65 | Ichinomiya | Takuma Obayashi | Asuka Takahashi | Takuto Inoue; Kenya Mitsuhashi | Ayako Sakuramoto; Rena Miyaura | Yuichi Shimogami; Yuna Kato |
| 2023 | 66 | Kyoto | Minoru Koga | Haruna Konishi | Kazuki Shibata; Naoki Yamada | Mizuki Otake; Miyu Takahashi | Yuichi Shimogami; Sayaka Hobara |
| 2024 | 67 | Tottori | Koo Takahashi | Riko Gunji | Hiroki Midorikawa; Kyohei Yamashita | Rin Iwanaga; Kie Nakanishi | Akira Koga; Yuki Fukushima |
| 2025 | 68 | Takamatsu | Koshiro Moriguchi | Runa Kurihara | Kakeru Kumagai; Hiroki Nishi | Sayaka Hirota; Ayako Sakuramoto | Akira Koga; Yuho Imai |
| 2026 | 69 | Nagano | Riku Hatano | Asuka Takahashi | Haruki Kawabe; Kenta Matsukawa | Hinata Suzuki; Nao Yamakita | Yuto Nakashizu; Mao Yamakita |
