= Badminton at the 2004 Summer Olympics – Women's doubles =

Women's doubles at the Games of the XXVIII Olympiad
- Venue: Goudi Olympic Hall
- Date: 14–21 August 2004
- Competitors: 23 from 16 nations

Medalists
1st place, gold medalist(s)		Yang Wei; Zhang Jiewen	China
2nd place, silver medalist(s)		Gao Ling; Huang Sui	China
3rd place, bronze medalist(s)		Lee Kyung-won; Ra Kyung-min	South Korea

These are the results of the women's doubles competition in badminton at the 2004 Summer Olympics in Athens.

== Medalists ==
Gold	Silver	Bronze
Yang Wei and Zhang Jiewen (CHN)	Gao Ling and Huang Sui (CHN)	Lee Kyung-won and Ra Kyung-min (KOR)

== Seeds ==
1. Yang Wei and Zhang Jiewen (CHN) (gold medalist)
2. Gao Ling and Huang Sui (CHN) (silver medalist)
3. Lee Kyung-won and Ra Kyung-min (KOR) (bronze medalist)
4. Wei Yili and Zhao Tingting (CHN) (fourth place)
5. Mia Audina and Lotte Jonathans (NED) (quarter-finals)
6. Hwang Yu-mi and Lee Hyo-jung (KOR) (quarter-finals)
7. Ann-Lou Jørgensen and Rikke Olsen (DEN) (quarter-finals)
8. Chikako Nakayama and Keiko Yoshitomi (JPN) (second round)

== Draw ==
=== Finals ===
Semifinals
1	Yang W (CHN); Zhang J (CHN)	15	15
3	Lee K (KOR); Ra K (KOR)	6	4
4	Wei Y (CHN); Zhao T (CHN)	10	14
2	Gao L (CHN); Huang S (CHN)	15	17

Final
1	Yang W (CHN); Zhang J (CHN)	7	15	15
2	Gao L (CHN); Huang S (CHN)	15	4	8
Bronze medal match
3	Lee K (KOR); Ra K (KOR)	10	15	15
4	Wei Y (CHN); Zhao T (CHN)	15	9	7

=== Top half ===
1st round
1	Yang W (CHN); Zhang J (CHN)
Bye
J Novita (INA); L Nurlita (INA)
Bye
8	C Nakayama (JPN); K Yoshitomi (JPN)
Bye
S Chankrachangwong (THA); S Thungthongkam (THA)	15	15
D Julien (CAN); A Rice (CAN)	3	4
3	Lee K (KOR); Ra K (KOR)
Bye
P Harder (DEN); M Schjoldager (DEN)	15	15
J Crabtree (AUS); K Wilson-Smith (AUS)	2	3
5	M Audina (NED); L Bruil (NED)
Bye
N Boteva (BUL); P Nedelcheva (BUL)	15	14
E Tripp (GBR); J Wright (GBR)	17	17

2nd round
1	Yang W (CHN); Zhang J (CHN)	15	6	15
J Novita (INA); L Nurlita (INA)	2	15	7
8	C Nakayama (JPN); K Yoshitomi (JPN)	4	11
S Chankrachangwong (THA); S Thungthongkam (THA)	15	15
3	Lee K (KOR); Ra K (KOR)	15	15
P Harder (DEN); M Schjoldager (DEN)	8	8
5	M Audina (NED); L Bruil (NED)	15	15
E Tripp (GBR); J Wright (GBR)	7	7

Quarterfinals
1	Yang W (CHN); Zhang J (CHN)	15	15
S Chankrachangwong (THA); S Thungthongkam (THA)	2	4
3	Lee K (KOR); Ra K (KOR)	15	15
5	M Audina (NED); L Bruil (NED)	2	2

Semifinals
1	Yang W (CHN); Zhang J (CHN)	15	15
3	Lee K (KOR); Ra K (KOR)	6	4

=== Bottom half ===
1st round
Cheng W (TPE); Chien Y (TPE)	15	15
H Nichol (CAN); C Reid (CAN)	0	10
Bye
6	Hwang Y (KOR); Lee H (KOR)
Koon WC (HKG); Li WM (HKG)	4	4
G Emms (GBR); D Kellogg (GBR)	15	15
Bye
4	Wei Y (CHN); Zhao T (CHN)
N Grether (GER); J Schenk (GER)	15	15
C Botts (RSA); M Edwards (RSA)	0	0
Bye
7	A Jørgensen (DEN); R Olsen (DEN)
S Yamada (JPN); S Yamamoto (JPN)	7	9
Chin EH (MAS); Wong PT (MAS)	15	15
Bye
2	Gao L (CHN); Huang S (CHN)

2nd round
Cheng W (TPE); Chien Y (TPE)	13	15	5
6	Hwang Y (KOR); Lee H (KOR)	15	8	15
G Emms (GBR); D Kellogg (GBR)	15	7	5
4	Wei Y (CHN); Zhao T (CHN)	13	15	15
N Grether (GER); J Schenk (GER)	12	17	5
7	A Jørgensen (DEN); R Olsen (DEN)	15	16	15
Chin EH (MAS); Wong PT (MAS)	12	8
2	Gao L (CHN); Huang S (CHN)	15	15

Quarterfinals
6	Hwang Y (KOR); Lee H (KOR)	15	6	13
4	Wei Y (CHN); Zhao T (CHN)	8	15	15
7	A Jørgensen (DEN); R Olsen (DEN)	6	7
2	Gao L (CHN); Huang S (CHN)	15	15

Semifinals
4	Wei Y (CHN); Zhao T (CHN)	10	14
2	Gao L (CHN); Huang S (CHN)	15	17
