= All Japan Badminton Championships =

Badminton championships

- Official website
- Founded: 1948; 78 years ago
- Editions: 79th (in 2025)
- Location: Chōfu, Tokyo; Japan
- Venue: Keio Arena Tokyo

Men's
- Draw: 32S / 32D
- Current champions: Kodai Naraoka (singles); Hiroki Midorikawa; Kyohei Yamashita (doubles)
- Most singles titles: 8 Ippei Kojima
- Most doubles titles: 9 Shinji Matsuura; Shuji Matsuno

Women's
- Draw: 32S / 32D
- Current champions: Akane Yamaguchi (singles); Arisa Igarashi; Chiharu Shida (doubles)
- Most singles titles: 8 Sumiko Kitada
- Most doubles titles: 10; Atsuko Tokuda

Mixed doubles
- Draw: 32
- Current champions: Yuta Watanabe; Maya Taguchi
- Most titles (male): 5 Yuta Watanabe
- Most titles (female): 6 Miyuki Maeda

All Japan Badminton Championships (全日本総合バドミントン選手権大会, Zen-Nihon Sōgō Badominton Senshuken Taikai) is the premier annual badminton tournament in Japan. Organized by the Badminton Association of Japan (BAJ), it is held in December and serves as the primary selection event for the Japanese national team for the upcoming season. The tournament is open to Japan's top-ranked professionals, university students, and high school athletes who qualify through regional or category-specific preliminaries.

== History ==
The All Japan Badminton Championships was established shortly after the creation of the Nippon Badminton Association (NBA) in 1946. The inaugural All Japan Championship was held on 8–9 May 1948, at the Second Normal School Women's Department Gymnasium in Tokyo. The first champions were Junichi Oka (Kanagawa) in men's singles and Taki Nakamura (Kanagawa) in women's singles. Mixed doubles was included as a discipline from the very first tournament, with the pair of Hiroko Oka and Isamu Mori (Kanagawa) taking the title.

The tournament is traditionally held annually. However, the official edition numbering contains an anomaly dating back to 1962. To adjust the tournament schedule to align with the fiscal year, the association held two championships in a single calendar year: the 15th edition (for the 1961 fiscal year) and the 16th edition (for the 1962 fiscal year).

In May 2026, the BAJ changed the tournament's scoring format to a "3 games of 15 points" system. Following the Badminton World Federation's (BWF) decision to adopt this new system for international competitions beginning in January 2027, the BAJ implemented the rule a year early across its domestic Category 1 tournaments, which includes the All Japan Championships. The association stated that the accelerated timeline was intended to prepare players for the upcoming 2028 Los Angeles Olympics qualification race, as well as to mitigate nationwide issues regarding lengthy match times.

== Eligibility ==
Athletes who meet any of the following criteria are eligible to participate:

- Those who placed in the top 8 in the previous year's tournament.
- Those who placed in the top 16 at this year's All Japan Members Badminton Championships.
- Those who placed in the top 4 at this year's All Japan Teachers' Badminton Championship.
- Those who placed in the top 4 at this year's All Japan High School Badminton Championships.
- Those who placed in the top 4 at this year's All Japan Junior Badminton Championships.
- Those who are ranked within the top 16 in the Japan National Ranking announced after this year's Japan Ranking Circuit Tournament.
- Those nominated from each region (one person and one group for each event).
- Nippon Badminton Association recommenders.

== National team selection ==
The All Japan Championships serves as the primary selection event for the Japanese national team. Under the official criteria set by the Badminton Association of Japan (BAJ), first-place winners in all five disciplines automatically qualify as National Team candidates for the upcoming year.

== Awards ==
The tournament confers prestigious government awards upon its winners:

- Prime Minister's Cup: Awarded to the winners of the men's and women's singles categories.
- MEXT Cup: The Ministry of Education, Culture, Sports, Science and Technology (MEXT) Cup is awarded to the winners of the men's, women's, and mixed doubles categories.
- BAJ Chairman's Cup: Awarded to the winners of all categories.

== Past winners ==
Year	Ed.	Men's singles	Women's singles	Men's doubles	Women's doubles	Mixed doubles	Ref
1948	1	Jun’ichi Oka	Taki Nakamura	Toshihide Hirota; Mitsuo Fujii	Taki Nakamura; Chieko Kawamata	Isamu Mori; Hiroko Oka	
1949	2	Jun’ichi Oka	Toyoko Yoshida	Toshihide Hirota; Mitsuo Fujii	Taki Nakamura; Chieko Kawamata	E. Emerl; Chieko Kawamata	
1950	3	Jun’ichi Oka	Toyoko Yoshida	Jun’ichi Oka; Mankichi Sōma	Toyoko Yoshida; Chieko Tamura	Yasuhisa Yamada; Chieko Tamura	
1951	4	Jun’ichi Oka	Fumiko Endō	Jun’ichi Oka; Michiaki Oka	Fumiko Endō; Utako Kobayashi	Yasuhisa Yamada; Chieko Tamura	
1952	5	Toshihide Hirota	Etsuko Nobori	Toshihide Hirota; Michiaki Oka	Ayaka Horie; Hisaka Hota	Hirotoshi Shibuya; Nobu Kojima	
1953	6	Toshihide Hirota	Mitsuko Yoshida	Hideo Yoshioka; Kōichi Fujii	Fumiko Endō; Tomiko Arakawa	Hirotoshi Shibuya; Nobu Kojima	
1954	7	Fumio Mochizuki	Tomiko Arakawa	Yoshirō Satō; Shigeru Yamasaki	Utako Kobayashi; Tomiko Arakawa	Hirotoshi Shibuya; Nobu Kojima	
1955	8	Masuhiro Ueda	Yoshiko Okawa	Kanetoshi Kataishi; Masanori Katō	Yoshiko Okawa; Mitsuko Fujita	Shigemi Tsuchiya; Yoshiko Irisawa	
1956	9	Kanetoshi Kataishi	Setsuko Gonda	Kanetoshi Kataishi; Masanori Katō	Hisako Toda; Keiko Kobayashi	Eiichi Kogai; Junko Honjō	
1957	10	Yoshirō Satō	Kinue Yokoi	Kanetoshi Kataishi; Eiichi Nagai	Yoshiko Okawa; Utako Kobayashi	Toshimichi Ishihara; Hisako Toda	
1958	11	Eiichi Nagai	Tomoko Tajima	Eiichi Nagai; Nobuhiro Namiki	Tomoko Tajima; Kyoko Miyakawa	Toshimichi Ishihara; Hisako Toda	
1959	12	Yoshirō Satō	Tomoko Tajima	Eiichi Nagai; Nobuhiro Namiki	Reiko Nakashima; Yōko Takahashi	Hajime Kaido; Miyako Morota	
1960	13	Takafusa Itagaki	Tomoko Tajima	Yoshiyasu Yamada; Satoru Nakamura	Tomoko Tajima (Kikuko Yamazaki)	Katsuhide Kitajima; Tomiko Ariki	
1961	14	Yoshio Komiya	Michiko Tachibana	Tsutomu Sawada; Kōichi Mori	Tomoko Takahashi; Fumiko Nagasaki	Kiyoshi Mōri; Sumi Negishi	
1962 (Note: In 1962, the association held two championships (the 15th and 16th editions) within the same calendar year to align the tournament schedule with the fiscal year.)	15	Yoshio Komiya	Fumiko Akiyama	Tsutomu Sawada; Kōichi Mori	Masako Kimura; Mitsuko Yokoyama	Hiroshi Sugita; Yoshiko Sugita	
1962	16	Takeshi Miyanaga	Noriko Takagi	Tsutomu Sawada; Kōichi Mori	Noriko Takagi; Miyako Morota	Tadao Hoshino; Tomiko Ariki	
1963	17	Kōichi Watabe	Fumiko Yokoi	Yukiharu Suzuki; Yoshiaki Tōjō	Tomiko Ariki; Hiromi Mihara	Tadao Hoshino; Tomiko Ariki	
1964	18	Takeshi Miyanaga	Noriko Takagi	Takeshi Miyanaga; Eiichi Sakai	Noriko Takagi; Hiroe Amano	Tadao Hoshino; Tomiko Ariki	
1965	19	Masao Akiyama	Mitsuko Yokoyama	Takeshi Miyanaga; Eiichi Sakai	Noriko Takagi; Hiroe Amano	Yoshiaki Tōjō; Fumiko Yokoi	
1966	20	Ippei Kojima	Noriko Takagi	Takeshi Miyanaga; Eiichi Sakai	Noriko Takagi; Hiroe Amano	Yoshio Komiya; Akemi Ueno	
1967	21	Ippei Kojima	Noriko Takagi	Ippei Kojima; Masao Akiyama	Noriko Takagi; Hiroe Amano	Yoshinori Itagaki; Setsuko Ōta	
1968	22	Ippei Kojima	Tomoko Takahashi	Ippei Kojima; Masao Akiyama	Machiko Aizawa; Etsuko Takenaka	Kenji Suzuki; Tomiko Ariki	
1969	23	Ippei Kojima	Hiroe Yuki	Ippei Kojima; Masao Akiyama	Machiko Aizawa; Etsuko Takenaka	Kenji Suzuki; Tomiko Ariki	
1970	24	Ippei Kojima	Etsuko Takenaka	Shōichi Toganoo; Eiichi Sakai	Machiko Aizawa; Etsuko Takenaka	Eiichi Sakai; Hiroe Amano	
1971	25	Shōichi Toganoo	Noriko Nakayama	Nobutaka Ikeda; Kenji Suzuki	Noriko Nakayama; Hiroe Yuki	Eiichi Sakai; Hiroe Amano	
1972	26	Ippei Kojima	Hiroe Yuki	Ippei Kojima; Masao Akiyama	Machiko Aizawa; Etsuko Takenaka	Eiichi Sakai; Hiroe Amano	
1973	27	Ippei Kojima	Hiroe Yuki	Shōichi Toganoo; Nobutaka Ikeda	Machiko Aizawa; Etsuko Takenaka	Shōichi Toganoo; Etsuko Takenaka	
1974	28	Kinji Zeniya	Hiroe Yuki	Shōichi Toganoo; Nobutaka Ikeda	Hiroe Yuki; Mika Ikeda	Shōichi Toganoo; Etsuko Takenaka	
1975	29	Ippei Kojima	Hiroe Yuki	Masao Tsuchida; Yoshitaka Iino	Etsuko Takenaka; Emiko Ueno	Shigemitsu Imai; Mika Ikeda	
1976	30	Kinji Zeniya	Hiroe Yuki	Shōichi Toganoo; Nobutaka Ikeda	Etsuko Takenaka; Emiko Ueno	Shōichi Toganoo; Etsuko Takenaka	
1977	31	Kinji Zeniya	Saori Kondō	Masao Tsuchida; Yoshitaka Iino	Atsuko Tokuda; Mikiko Takada	(Noboru Kusaka) (Mayumi Ushida)	
1978	32	Kinji Zeniya	Atsuko Tokuda	Masao Tsuchida; Yoshitaka Iino	Atsuko Tokuda; Mikiko Takada	Motoo Nakai; Yōko Chiba	
1979	33	Kinji Zeniya	Yoshiko Yonekura	Nobutaka Ikeda; Mikio Ozaki	Atsuko Tokuda; Yoshiko Yonekura	Shōichi Toganoo; Etsuko Toganoo	
1980	34	Hiroyuki Hasegawa	Sumiko Kitada	Masao Tsuchida; Yoshitaka Iino	Atsuko Tokuda; Yoshiko Yonekura	Motoo Nakai; Yōko Hata	
1981	35	Kinji Zeniya	Sumiko Kitada	Kinji Zeniya; Hiroshi Nishiyama	Atsuko Tokuda; Yoshiko Yonekura	Shōichi Toganoo; Etsuko Toganoo	
1982	36	Hiroyuki Hasegawa	Sumiko Kitada	Hiroyuki Hasegawa; Yukihiro Miyamoto	Atsuko Tokuda; Yoshiko Yonekura	Toshihiro Tsuji (Ayako Tokunaga)	
1983	37	Hiroyuki Hasegawa	Fumiko Tōkairin	Shinji Matsuura; Shūji Matsuno	Atsuko Tokuda; Yoshiko Yonekura	(Hiroshi Suzuki); Kazuko Sekine	
1984	38	Kinji Zeniya	Sumiko Kitada	Shōkichi Miyamori; Tetsuaki Inoue	Atsuko Tokuda; Yoshiko Yonekura	Kyōji Kushi; Kimiko Jinnai	
1985	39	Hiroshi Nishiyama	Sumiko Kitada	Shinji Matsuura; Shūji Matsuno	Kazuko Takamine; Kazue Hoshi	Akio Tomita; Michiko Tomita	
1986	40	Shinji Matsuura	Sumiko Kitada	Shinji Matsuura; Shūji Matsuno	Atsuko Tokuda; Yoshiko Yonekura	Naotsugu Tanida; Kazuko Takamine	
1987	41	Hiroshi Nishiyama	Sumiko Kitada	Shinji Matsuura; Shūji Matsuno	Atsuko Tokuda; Yoshiko Yonekura	Hiroyuki Hasegawa (Hiromi Moriyama)	
1988	42	Shinji Matsuura	Sumiko Kitada	Shinji Matsuura; Shūji Matsuno	Kimiko Jinnai; Hisako Mori	Naotsugu Tanida; Tokiko Hirota	
1989	43	Shūji Matsuno	Aiko Miyamura	Shinji Matsuura; Shūji Matsuno	Kimiko Jinnai; Hisako Mori	Naotsugu Tanida; Tokiko Hirota	
1990	44	Shinji Matsuura	Hisako Mizui	Shinji Matsuura; Shūji Matsuno	Kimiko Jinnai; Hisako Mori	Takao Hayato; Michiyo Tashiro	
1991	45	Shūji Matsuno	Tomomi Matsuo	Shinji Matsuura; Shūji Matsuno	Tomomi Matsuo; Kyoko Sasage	Yasumasa Tsujita; Haruko Matsuda	
1992	46	Kazuhiro Shimogami	Aiko Miyamura	Shinji Matsuura; Shūji Matsuno	Yūko Koike; Tokiko Hirota	Katsushi Koga; Yōko Fujimoto	
1993	47	Fumihiko Machida	Hisako Mizui	Tatsuya Yanagiya; Hiroki Etō	Yūko Koike; Tokiko Hirota	Akihiro Imai; Miwa Kai	
1994	48	Fumihiko Machida	Hisako Mizui	Tatsuya Yanagiya; Hiroki Etō	Masako Sakamoto; Tomomi Matsuo	Akihiro Imai; Miwa Kai	
1995	49	Fumihiko Machida	Hisako Mizui	Fumihiko Machida; Seiichi Watanabe	Masako Sakamoto; Tomomi Matsuo	Atsuhito Kitani; Shinobu Sasaki	
1996	50	Takahiro Suka	Takako Ida	Takuya Katayama; Yuzo Kubota	Yoshiko Iwata; Haruko Matsuda	Norio Imai; Haruko Matsuda	
1997	51	Shinji Ōta	Takako Ida	Shinji Ōta; Takuya Takehana	Takae Masumo; Chikako Nakayama	Kōji Miya; Yoshiko Tago	
1998	52	Keita Masuda	Miho Tanaka	Keita Masuda; Tadashi Ōtsuka	Haruko Matsuda; Yoshiko Iwata	Fumitake Shimizu; Fujimi Tamura	
1999	53	Keita Masuda	Yasuko Mizui	Keita Masuda; Tadashi Ōtsuka	Takae Masumo; Chikako Nakayama	Tomohiko Usui; Kirika Kawaguchi	
2000	54	Keita Masuda	Kanako Yonekura	Takuya Katayama; Yuzo Kubota	Shizuka Yamamoto; Seiko Yamada	Norio Imai; Chikako Nakayama	
2001	55	Keita Masuda	Kaori Mori	Shinji Ōta; Takuya Takehana	Akiko Nakashima; Keiko Yoshitomi	Norio Imai; Chikako Nakayama	
2002	56	Keita Masuda	Kumiko Ogura	Keita Masuda; Tadashi Ōtsuka	Chikako Nakayama; Keiko Yoshitomi	Tadashi Ōtsuka; Shizuka Yamamoto	
2003	57	Shōji Satō	Kaori Mori	Keita Masuda; Tadashi Ōtsuka	Shizuka Yamamoto; Seiko Yamada	Tadashi Ōtsuka; Shizuka Yamamoto	
2004	58	Shōji Satō	Eriko Hirose	Keita Masuda; Tadashi Ōtsuka	Kumiko Ogura; Reiko Shiota	Tadashi Ōtsuka; Shizuka Yamamoto	
2005	59	Shōji Satō	Kanako Yonekura	Shūichi Nakao; Shūichi Sakamoto	Kumiko Ogura; Reiko Shiota	Keita Masuda; Miyuki Maeda	
2006	60	Shōji Satō	Eriko Hirose	Shintaro Ikeda; Shūichi Sakamoto	Kumiko Ogura; Reiko Shiota	Keita Masuda; Miyuki Maeda	
2007	61	Sho Sasaki	Kaori Imabeppu	Keishi Kawaguchi; Naoki Kawamae	Kumiko Ogura; Reiko Shiota	Keita Masuda; Miyuki Maeda	
2008	62	Kenichi Tago	Eriko Hirose	Shintarō Ikeda; Shūichi Sakamoto	Kumiko Ogura; Reiko Shiota	Keita Masuda; Miyuki Maeda	
2009	63	Kenichi Tago	Eriko Hirose	Noriyasu Hirata; Hirokatsu Hashimoto	Shizuka Matsuo; Mami Naitō	Noriyasu Hirata; Miyuki Maeda	
2010	64	Kenichi Tago	Eriko Hirose	Noriyasu Hirata; Hirokatsu Hashimoto	Satoko Suetsuna; Miyuki Maeda	Noriyasu Hirata; Miyuki Maeda	
2011	65	Kenichi Tago	Nozomi Okuhara	Noriyasu Hirata; Hirokatsu Hashimoto	Misaki Matsutomo; Ayaka Takahashi	Shintarō Ikeda; Reiko Shiota	
2012	66	Kenichi Tago	Kaori Imabeppu	Hiroyuki Endo; Kenichi Hayakawa	Misaki Matsutomo; Ayaka Takahashi	Takeshi Kamura; Koharu Yonemoto	
2013	67	Kenichi Tago	Minatsu Mitani	Hiroyuki Endo; Kenichi Hayakawa	Misaki Matsutomo; Ayaka Takahashi	Kenichi Hayakawa; Misaki Matsutomo	
2014	68	Sho Sasaki	Akane Yamaguchi	Hiroyuki Endo; Kenichi Hayakawa	Naoko Fukuman; Kurumi Yonao	Kenichi Hayakawa; Misaki Matsutomo	
2015	69	Kento Momota	Nozomi Okuhara	Takeshi Kamura; Keigo Sonoda	Misaki Matsutomo; Ayaka Takahashi	Kenta Kazuno; Ayane Kurihara	
2016	70	Kenta Nishimoto	Sayaka Sato	Takeshi Kamura; Keigo Sonoda	Misaki Matsutomo; Ayaka Takahashi	Takeshi Kamura; Koharu Yonemoto	
2017	71	Riichi Takeshita	Akane Yamaguchi	Hiroyuki Endo; Yuta Watanabe	Yuki Fukushima; Sayaka Hirota	Yuta Watanabe; Arisa Higashino	
2018	72	Kento Momota	Akane Yamaguchi	Takeshi Kamura; Keigo Sonoda	Yuki Fukushima; Sayaka Hirota	Yuta Watanabe; Arisa Higashino	
2019	73	Kento Momota	Nozomi Okuhara	Hiroyuki Endo; Yuta Watanabe	Mayu Matsumoto; Wakana Nagahara	Yuta Watanabe; Arisa Higashino	
2020	74	Kento Momota	Nozomi Okuhara	Hiroyuki Endo; Yuta Watanabe	Yuki Fukushima; Sayaka Hirota	Yuta Watanabe; Arisa Higashino	
2021	75	Yushi Tanaka	Nozomi Okuhara	Masato Takano; Katsuki Tamate	Sayaka Hobara; Rena Miyaura	Hiroki Midorikawa; Natsu Saito	
2022	76	Kento Momota	Akane Yamaguchi	Takuro Hoki; Yugo Kobayashi	Yuki Fukushima; Sayaka Hirota	Yuki Kaneko; Misaki Matsutomo	
2023	77	Kento Momota	Kaoru Sugiyama	Akira Koga; Taichi Saito	Rena Miyaura; Ayako Sakuramoto	Kyohei Yamashita; Naru Shinoya	
2024	78	Yushi Tanaka	Tomoka Miyazaki	Hiroki Midorikawa; Kyohei Yamashita	Nami Matsuyama; Chiharu Shida	Kazuki Shibata; Naru Shinoya	
2025	79	Kodai Naraoka	Akane Yamaguchi	Hiroki Midorikawa; Kyohei Yamashita	Arisa Igarashi; Chiharu Shida	Yuta Watanabe; Maya Taguchi	
