= Hashiru Shimono =

Japanese badminton player (born 1997)

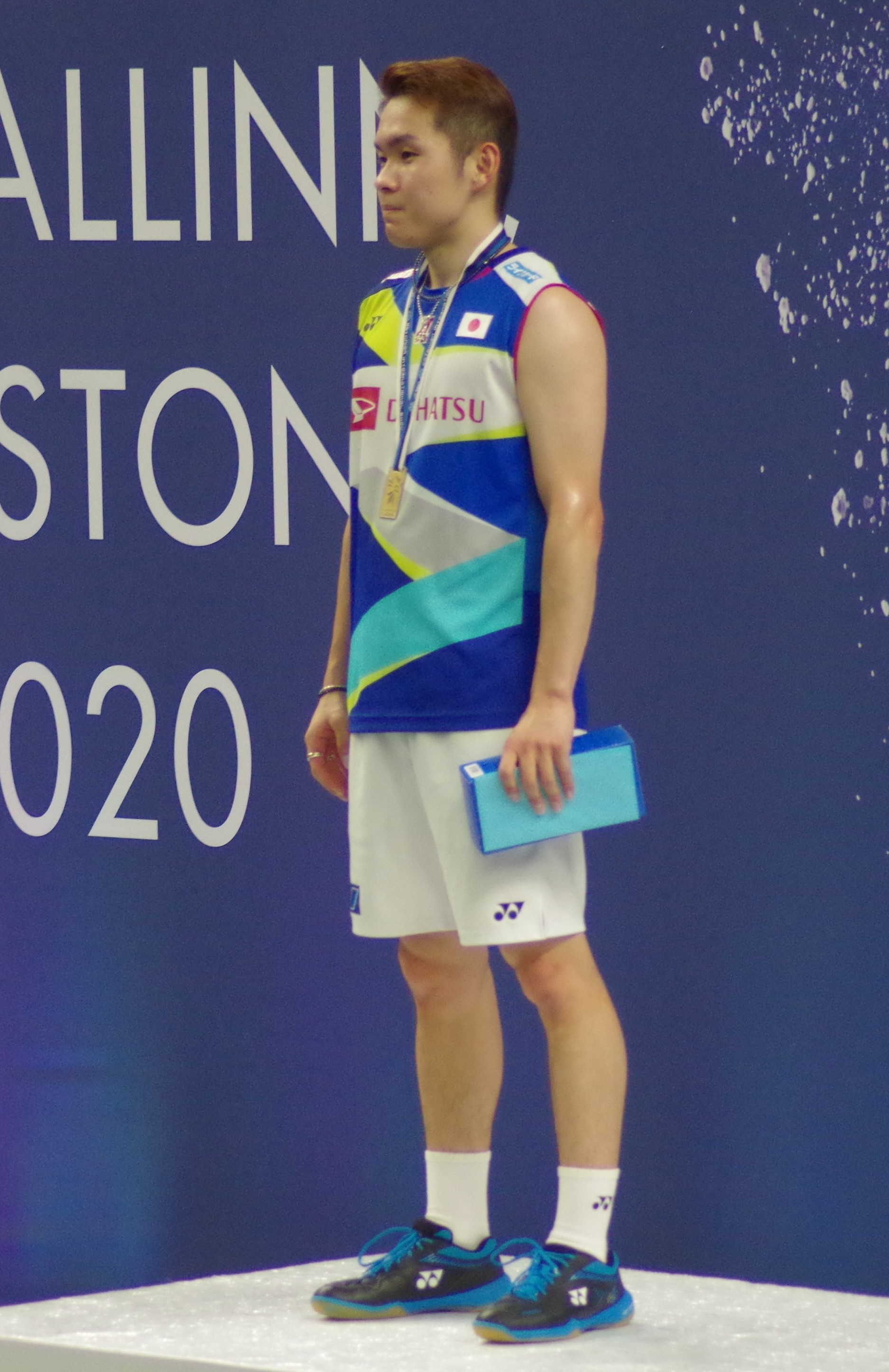
- Shimono at the 2020 Estonian International

Personal information
- Born: 21 March 1997 (age 29) Osaka Prefecture, Japan
- Height: 1.73 m (5 ft 8 in)
- Weight: 64 kg (141 lb)

Sport
- Country: Japan
- Sport: Badminton
- Handedness: Right

Men's singles
- Highest ranking: 71 (23 March 2017)
- BWF profile
Medal record
Men's badminton
Representing Japan
World Junior Championships
Bronze medal – third place	2014 Alor Setar	Mixed team
Asian Junior Championships
Bronze medal – third place	2014 Taipei	Boys' doubles
Bronze medal – third place	2014 Taipei	Mixed team
Bronze medal – third place	2013 Kota Kinabalu	Mixed team

Hashiru Shimono (下農走, Shimono Hashiru; born 21 March 1997) is a Japanese badminton player. In his junior career, he won three bronze medals with the Japanese national team in the team event at the 2014 World Junior Championships and the 2013 and 2014 Asian Junior Championships. He also won an individual boys' doubles bronze medal with Kanta Tsuneyama at the 2014 Asian Junior Championships.

Shimono began his senior career with the Tonami Transportation team in 2015. Initially a singles player, he won his first international title at the 2020 Estonian International. After shifting his focus to doubles in 2022, he was the runner-up in men's doubles at the 2022 Canadian International with Mahiro Kaneko, and in mixed doubles at the 2023 Northern Marianas Open with Miku Shigeta. He has been affiliated with the Kanazawa Gakuin Club since 2024.

== Early career ==
Hashiru Shimono began his badminton career at age six. He received early training and education at Uriwari Nishi SSC, Daito Junior High School, and Higashi Osaka University Kashiwara High School. From 2012 to 2014, Shimono was a member of the Japan U-19 junior national team and part of three bronze medal-winning mixed teams at the 2013 and 2014 Asian Junior Championships, and at the 2014 World Junior Championships.

During his junior career, Shimono partnered with Kanta Tsuneyama in boys' doubles. The pair won a bronze medal at the 2014 Asian Junior Championships. They won two major Japanese national titles, defeating Kenya Mitsuhashi and Yuta Watanabe in the finals of both the 2013 All Japan Junior Championship and the 2014 Inter-High School Championships.

== Career ==
Shimono began his professional career in 2015, joining the Tonami Transportation badminton team. From 2014 to 2021, he was a member of the Japan national B team, except for in 2018. He transferred to the Kanazawa Gakuin Club for the 2024 season.

=== Singles career ===
Shimono achieved his first senior international title at the 2020 Estonian International, where he defeated Lucas Claerbout in the final. On the BWF World Tour, his best result was reaching the semifinals at the 2019 Akita Masters Super 100. On the BWF International Challenge circuit, he was a semifinalist at the 2016 Polish Open, the 2018 South Australia International, and the 2019 Osaka International. Shimono achieved a career-high singles ranking of world No. 71 on 23 March 2017.

Domestically, he was the singles runner-up at the All Japan Members Badminton Championships in both 2016 and 2018. In 2021, he reached the semifinals of the All Japan Badminton Championships, the nation's highest-ranking domestic tournament.

=== Doubles career ===
From 2022, Shimono began competing primarily in doubles events. In men's doubles, he and Mahiro Kaneko were runners-up at the 2022 Canadian International. In mixed doubles, Shimono partnered with Miku Shigeta and reached the final of the 2023 Northern Marianas Open.

Nationally, in 2023, Shimono and Miku Shigeta won the mixed doubles title at the Japan Ranking Circuit Tournament and were runners-up at the All Japan Members Badminton Championships. The following year, at the 2024 Japan Ranking Circuit Tournament, Shimono was a runner-up in two disciplines: men's doubles with Yujiro Nishikawa and mixed doubles with Hina Osawa.

== Achievements ==
=== Asian Junior Championships ===
Boys' doubles
Year	Venue	Partner	Opponent	Score	Result	Ref.
2014	Taipei Gymnasium; Taipei, Chinese Taipei	(Japan) Kanta Tsuneyama	(South Korea) Kim Jae-hwan (South Korea) Kim Jung-ho	16–21, 17–21	Bronze	

=== BWF International Challenge/Series (1 title, 2 runners-up) ===
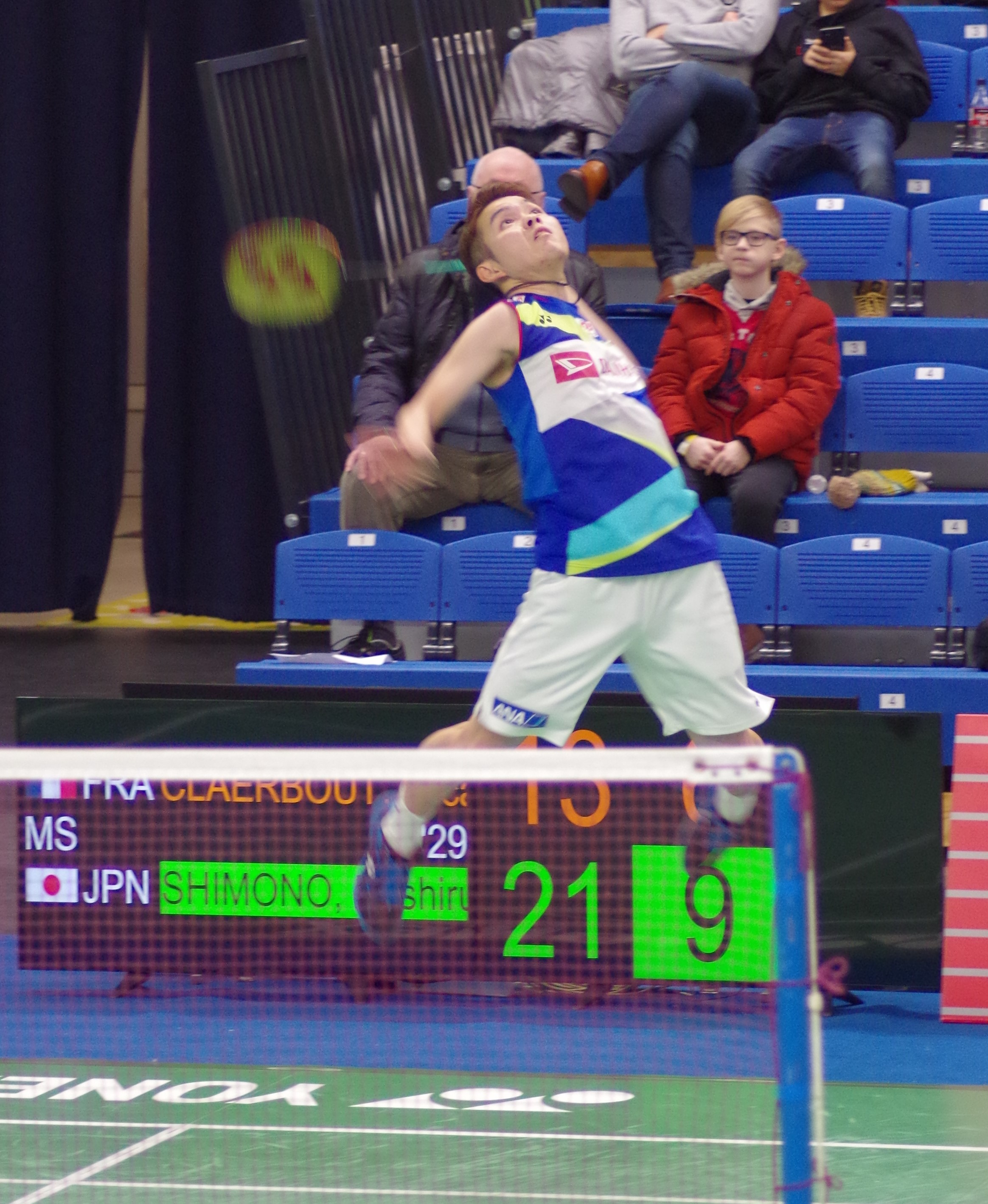
Hashiru Shimono at Estonian International 2020

Men's singles
Year	Tournament	Opponent	Score	Result	Ref.
2020	Estonian International	(France) Lucas Claerbout	21–13, 21–17	(gold) Winner	

Men's doubles
Year	Tournament	Partner	Opponent	Score	Result	Ref.
2022	Canadian International	(Japan) Mahiro Kaneko	(Denmark) Rasmus Kjær (Denmark) Frederik Søgaard	17–21, 17–21	(silver) Runner-up	

Mixed doubles

Year	Tournament	Opponent	Score	Result	Ref
2023	Northern Marianas Open	(Japan) Miku Shigeta	(South Korea) Wang Chan (South Korea) Shin Seung-chan	13–21, 15–21	(silver) Runner-up

BWF International Challenge tournament
BWF International Series tournament

== Record against selected opponents ==
Record against Year-end Finals finalists, World Championships semi-finalists, and Olympic quarter-finalists. Accurate as of 6 July 2025.

Player	Matches	Win	Lost	Diff.
(China) Shi Yuqi	1	0	1	-1
(Denmark) Anders Antonsen	1	0	1	-1
(Indonesia) Tommy Sugiarto	1	0	1	-1
(Singapore) Loh Kean Yew	1	0	1	-1
(South Korea) Lee Hyun-il	1	0	1	-1
(Thailand) Kunlavut Vitidsarn	2	0	2	-2
(Thailand) Kantaphon Wangcharoen	1	0	1	-1
(Vietnam) Nguyễn Tiến Minh	3	0	3	-3
