= Japan Ranking Circuit Tournament =

National badminton tournament

- Founded: 1999; 27 years ago
- Editions: 29th (in 2026)
- Location: Saitama, Saitama Prefecture; Japan
- Venue: Saiden Chemical Arena

Men's
- Draw: 32S / 32D
- Current champions: Koo Takahashi (singles); Hiroki Okamura; Kyohei Yamashita (doubles)
- Most singles titles: 5 Sho Sasaki
- Most doubles titles: 4 Keita Masuda; Tadashi Ōtsuka

Women's
- Draw: 32S / 32D
- Current champions: Yuzuno Watanabe (singles); Miyu Takahashi; Sumire Nakade (doubles)
- Most singles titles: 3 Kanako Yonekura
- Most doubles titles: 5 Chikako Nakayama

Mixed doubles
- Draw: 32
- Current champions: Yuto Nakashizu; Maya Taguchi
- Most titles (male): 2 Ryota Taohata; Yuta Watanabe
- Most titles (female): 2 Arisa Higashino

Japan Ranking Circuit Tournament (日本ランキングサーキット大会, Nihon Rankingu Sākitto Taikai) is a national badminton tournament organized by the Badminton Association of Japan. It is a tournament that is eligible for ranking points in the Japan Rankings.

== History ==
The Japan Ranking Circuit Tournament was established in 1999. The inaugural edition took place from 25 July to 29 July 1999, at the Nippon Sport Science University Yonemoto Memorial Gymnasium. The tournament's first champions were Keita Masuda in men's singles, Kanako Yonekura in women's singles, Takuya Katayama and Yūzō Kubota in men's doubles, and Chikako Nakayama and Takae Masumo in women's doubles. A mixed doubles event was not contested during this first edition.

In 2026, second-year high school student Yuzuno Watanabe won the women's singles event, becoming the youngest player to ever win a title across all categories in the tournament's history. Previously, the youngest champions had been third-year high school students, including Nozomi Okuhara (2012) and Aya Ohori (2014) in women's singles, as well as Yuta Watanabe (2015) in mixed doubles.

== Past winners ==
Year	Ed.	Men's singles	Women's singles	Men's doubles	Women's doubles	Mixed doubles	Ref
1999	1	Keita Masuda	Kanako Yonekura	Takuya Katayama; Yūzō Kubota	Chikako Nakayama; Takae Masumo	No Competition	
2000	2	Shinya Ohtsuka	Shizuka Yamamoto	Takaaki Hayashi; Katsuya Nishiyama	Shizuka Yamamoto; Seiko Yamada	No Competition	
2000	3	Shinya Ohtsuka	Kanako Yonekura	Takuya Katayama; Yūzō Kubota	Chikako Nakayama; Mika Anjo	No Competition	
2001	4	Kazuhiro Shimogami	Kaori Mori	Keita Masuda; Tadashi Ōtsuka	Chikako Nakayama; Mika Anjo	No Competition	
2001	5	Hidetaka Yamada	Kanako Yonekura	Takuya Katayama; Yūzō Kubota	Chikako Nakayama; Mika Anjo	No Competition	
2002	6	Keita Masuda	Miho Tanaka	Keita Masuda; Tadashi Ōtsuka	Chikako Nakayama; Keiko Yoshitomi	No Competition	
2003	7	Hidetaka Yamada	Miho Tanaka	Shuichi Nakao; Shuichi Sakamoto	Aki Akao; Tomomi Matsuda	No Competition	
2004	8	Shōji Satō	Eriko Hirose	Keita Masuda; Tadashi Ōtsuka	Miyuki Maeda; Satoko Suetsuna	No Competition	
2005	9	Sho Sasaki	Eriko Hirose	Keita Masuda; Tadashi Ōtsuka	Miyuki Maeda; Satoko Suetsuna	No Competition	
2006	10	Sho Sasaki	Yu Hirayama	Shintaro Ikeda; Shuichi Sakamoto	Ikue Tatani; Aya Wakisaka	No Competition	
2007	11	Sho Sasaki	Yu Hirayama	Keita Masuda; Tadashi Ōtsuka	Ikue Tatani; Aya Wakisaka	No Competition	
2008	12	Sho Sasaki	Ai Goto	Kenichi Hayakawa; Kenta Kazuno	Yasuyo Imabeppu; Shizuka Matsuo	No Competition	
2009	13	Sho Sasaki	Kaori Imabeppu	Hirokatsu Hashimoto; Noriyasu Hirata	Shizuka Matsuo; Mami Naito	No Competition	
2010	14	Riichi Takeshita	Kaori Imabeppu	Naoki Kawamae; Shōji Satō	Miyuki Maeda; Satoko Suetsuna	Shintaro Ikeda; Reiko Shiota	
2011	15	Riichi Takeshita	Minatsu Mitani	Takeshi Kamura; Keigo Sonoda	Yuriko Miki; Koharu Yonemoto	Ryota Taohata; Sayuri Asahara	
2012	16	Jun Takemura	Nozomi Okuhara	Takeshi Kamura; Keigo Sonoda	Naoko Fukuman; Kurumi Yonao	Daisuke Suzuki; Miki Komori	
2013	17	Jun Takemura	Yuka Kusunose	Kenta Kazuno; Kazushi Yamada	Asumi Kugo; Yui Miyauchi	Takuto Inoue; Ayaka Takahashi	
2014	18	Kazuteru Kozai	Aya Ohori	Kenta Kazuno; Kazushi Yamada	Misato Aratama; Megumi Taruno	Ryota Taohata; Ayane Kurihara	
2015	19	Kazumasa Sakai	Sayaka Sato	Takuro Hoki; Yugo Kobayashi	Koharu Yonemoto; Shiho Tanaka	Yuta Watanabe; Arisa Higashino	
2016	20	Yu Igarashi	Ayumi Mine	Kenya Mitsuhashi; Yuta Watanabe	Ayako Sakuramoto; Yukiko Takahata	Yuta Watanabe; Arisa Higashino	
2017	21	Kento Momota	Natsuki Nidaira	Akira Koga; Taichi Saito	Mayu Matsumoto; Wakana Nagahara	Yuki Kaneko; Kie Nakanishi	
2018	22	Riichi Takeshita	Minatsu Mitani	Akira Koga; Taichi Saito	Ayane Kurihara; Naru Shinoya	Takuro Hoki; Wakana Nagahara	
2019	23	Yu Igarashi	Asuka Takahashi	Takuto Inoue; Yuki Kaneko	Chisato Hoshi; Aoi Matsuda	Tadayuki Urai; Rena Miyaura	
2021	24	Minoru Koga	Sayaka Sato	Keiichiro Matsui; Yoshinori Takeuchi	Chisato Hoshi; Aoi Matsuda	Kyohei Yamashita; Naru Shinoya	
2022	25	Kodai Naraoka	Aya Ohori	Mahiro Kaneko; Keigo Sonoda	Mizuki Otake; Miyu Takahashi	Hiroki Midorikawa; Natsu Saito	
2023	26	Minoru Koga	Akari Kurihara	Mahiro Kaneko; Shunya Ota	Maiko Kawazoe; Haruna Konishi	Hashiru Shimono; Miku Shigeta	
2024	27	Yushi Tanaka	Asuka Takahashi	Hiroki Midorikawa; Kyohei Yamashita	Mizuki Otake; Miyu Takahashi	Yuichi Shimogami; Sayaka Hobara	
2025	28	Takuma Obayashi	Manami Suizu	Yudai Nagafuchi; Kota Ogawa	Hinata Suzuki; Nao Yamakita	Hiroki Nishi; Akari Sato	
2026	29	Koo Takahashi	Yuzuno Watanabe	Hiroki Okamura; Kyohei Yamashita	Miyu Takahashi; Sumire Nakade	Yuto Nakashizu; Maya Taguchi	
