= Japan national badminton team =

Japan
- Association: Badminton Association of Japan
- Confederation: Badminton Asia
- President: Mitsuru Murai

BWF ranking
- Current ranking: 3 (6 October 2026)
- Highest ranking: 1 (4 October 2018)

Sudirman Cup
- Appearances: 17 (first in 1989)
- Best result: Runners-up (2015, 2019, 2021)

Thomas Cup
- Appearances: 18 (first in 1964)
- Best result: Champions (2014)

Uber Cup
- Appearances: 28 (first in 1966)
- Best result: Champions (1966, 1969, 1972, 1978, 1981, 2018)

Asian Mixed Team Championships
- Appearances: 4 (first in 2017)
- Best result: Champions (2017)

Asian Men's Team Championships
- Appearances: 10 (first in 1965)
- Best result: Champions (2026)

Asian Women's Team Championships
- Appearances: 4 (first in 2016)
- Best result: Champions (2018, 2020)

The Japan national badminton team (Japanese: 日本代表バドミントンチーム) represents Japan in international badminton competitions. The Japanese women's team have won the Uber Cup 6 times, with their most recent being the 2018 Uber Cup. The men's team won their first Thomas Cup title in 2014. The mixed team were runners-up three times at the Sudirman Cup.

The Japanese badminton team has been prestigious in the Olympics, having won a gold medal in the 2016 Summer Olympics and a silver and 2 bronze medals.

== Summer Olympic Games ==
Japan made its Olympic badminton debut when the sport became a full medal event at the 1992 Barcelona Olympics. The nation won its first-ever Olympic badminton medal at the 2012 London Olympics, where Mizuki Fujii and Reika Kakiiwa secured a silver in women's doubles. Japan's first gold medal came at the 2016 Rio Olympics from Misaki Matsutomo and Ayaka Takahashi in women's doubles; at the same Games, Nozomi Okuhara claimed a bronze in women's singles, Japan's first medal in that discipline. Yuta Watanabe and Arisa Higashino won the nation's first mixed doubles medal with a bronze in 2020 Tokyo Olympic and followed it with another bronze in 2024 Paris Olympic, becoming the first Japanese badminton players to win medals in consecutive Olympics.

=== Medals table ===
As of the 2024 Olympics

Badminton at Summer Olympics all time medal table-Japan
| Events | | (gold) Gold | (silver) Silver | (bronze) Bronze | Total |
|---|---|---|---|---|---|
| MS | Men's singles | 0 | 0 | 0 | 0 |
| WS | Women's singles | 0 | 0 | 1 | 1 |
| MD | Men's doubles | 0 | 0 | 0 | 0 |
| WD | Women's doubles | 1 | 1 | 1 | 3 |
| XD | Mixed doubles | 0 | 0 | 2 | 2 |
| Total | | 1 | 1 | 4 | 6 |

=== List of medalists ===
| Year | Location | Player | Category | Medal |
|---|---|---|---|---|
| 2012 | London, England | Mizuki Fujii; Reika Kakiiwa | Women's doubles | (silver) Silver |
| 2016 | Rio de Janeiro, Brazil | Misaki Matsutomo; Ayaka Takahashi | Women's doubles | (gold) Gold |
| 2016 | Rio de Janeiro, Brazil | Nozomi Okuhara | Women's singles | (bronze) Bronze |
| 2020 | Tokyo, Japan | Yuta Watanabe; Arisa Higashino | Mixed doubles | (bronze) Bronze |
| 2024 | Paris, France | Yuta Watanabe; Arisa Higashino | Mixed doubles | (bronze) Bronze |
| 2024 | Paris, France | Nami Matsuyama; Chiharu Shida | Women's doubles | (bronze) Bronze |

== World Badminton Championships ==
Japan has competed in the BWF World Championships since the inaugural tournament in 1977, where Etsuko Toganoo and Emiko Ueno won the nation's first gold medal in women's doubles. After winning medals in 1980, the team did not secure another podium finish until 2003. The country's first medal in a men's event occurred in 2007, with a bronze in men's doubles.

Starting in 2017, the team secured several historical firsts. Nozomi Okuhara became Japan's first women's singles world champion that year. Kento Momota followed as the first Japanese men's singles champion, winning consecutive titles in 2018 and 2019. In women's doubles, Mayu Matsumoto and Wakana Nagahara also claimed back-to-back gold medals during those years. In 2021, Takuro Hoki and Yugo Kobayashi became the nation's first world champions in men's doubles. With three women's singles titles, Akane Yamaguchi is Japan's most successful player across any discipline at the world championships. Mixed doubles remains the only discipline in which Japan has not yet won a title.

=== Medals table ===
As of 2026 BWF World Championships

World Badminton Championships all time medal table-Japan
| Events | | Gold | Silver | Bronze | Total |
|---|---|---|---|---|---|
| MS | Men's singles | 2 | 2 | 1 | 4 |
| WS | Women's singles | 4 | 2 | 4 | 9 |
| MD | Men's doubles | 1 | 2 | 3 | 6 |
| WD | Women's doubles | 3 | 3 | 12 | 18 |
| XD | Mixed doubles | 0 | 2 | 3 | 5 |
| Total | | 10 | 11 | 23 | 44 |

=== List of medalists ===
| Year | Player | Category | Medal |
|---|---|---|---|
| 1977 | Etsuko Toganoo; Emiko Ueno | Women's doubles | Gold |
| 1977 | Hiroe Yuki | Women's singles | Bronze |
| 1980 | Yoshiko Yonekura; Atsuko Tokuda | Women's doubles | Bronze |
| 2003 | Shizuka Yamamoto; Seiko Yamada | Women's doubles | Bronze |
| 2007 | Shuichi Sakamoto; Shintaro Ikeda | Men's doubles | Bronze |
| 2007 | Kumiko Ogura; Reiko Shiota | Women's doubles | Bronze |
| 2011 | Miyuki Maeda; Satoko Suetsuna | Women's doubles | Bronze |
| 2014 | Minatsu Mitani | Women's singles | Bronze |
| 2014 | Reika Kakiiwa; Miyuki Maeda | Women's doubles | Bronze |
| 2015 | Kento Momota | Men's singles | Bronze |
| 2015 | Hiroyuki Endo; Kenichi Hayakawa | Men's doubles | Bronze |
| 2015 | Naoko Fukuman; Kurumi Yonao | Women's doubles | Bronze |
| 2017 | Nozomi Okuhara | Women's singles | Gold |
| 2017 | Yuki Fukushima; Sayaka Hirota | Women's doubles | Silver |
| 2017 | Takeshi Kamura; Keigo Sonoda | Men's doubles | Bronze |
| 2017 | Misaki Matsutomo; Ayaka Takahashi | Women's doubles | Bronze |
| 2018 | Kento Momota | Men's singles | Gold |
| 2018 | Mayu Matsumoto; Wakana Nagahara | Women's doubles | Gold |
| 2018 | Takeshi Kamura; Keigo Sonoda | Men's doubles | Silver |
| 2018 | Yuki Fukushima; Sayaka Hirota | Women's doubles | Silver |
| 2018 | Akane Yamaguchi | Women's singles | Bronze |
| 2018 | Shiho Tanaka; Koharu Yonemoto | Women's doubles | Bronze |

| Year | Player | Category | Medal |
|---|---|---|---|
| 2019 | Kento Momota | Men's singles | Gold |
| 2019 | Mayu Matsumoto; Wakana Nagahara | Women's doubles | Gold |
| 2019 | Nozomi Okuhara | Women's singles | Silver |
| 2019 | Takuro Hoki; Yugo Kobayashi | Men's doubles | Silver |
| 2019 | Yuki Fukushima; Sayaka Hirota | Women's doubles | Silver |
| 2019 | Yuta Watanabe; Arisa Higashino | Mixed doubles | Bronze |
| 2021 | Akane Yamaguchi | Women's singles | Gold |
| 2021 | Takuro Hoki; Yugo Kobayashi | Men's doubles | Gold |
| 2021 | Yuta Watanabe; Arisa Higashino | Mixed doubles | Silver |
| 2021 | Mayu Matsumoto; Wakana Nagahara | Women's doubles | Bronze |
| 2021 | Kyohei Yamashita; Naru Shinoya | Mixed doubles | Bronze |
| 2022 | Akane Yamaguchi | Women's singles | Gold |
| 2022 | Yuta Watanabe; Arisa Higashino | Mixed doubles | Silver |
| 2022 | Mayu Matsumoto; Wakana Nagahara | Women's doubles | Bronze |
| 2023 | Kodai Naraoka | Men's singles | Silver |
| 2023 | Akane Yamaguchi | Women's singles | Bronze |
| 2023 | Yuta Watanabe; Arisa Higashino | Mixed doubles | Bronze |
| 2025 | Akane Yamaguchi | Women's singles | Gold |
| 2025 | Rin Iwanaga; Kie Nakanishi | Women's doubles | Bronze |
| 2025 | Nami Matsuyama; Chiharu Shida | Women's doubles | Bronze |
| 2026 | Kodai Naraoka | Men's singles | Silver |
| 2026 | Akane Yamaguchi | Women's singles | Silver |

=== Most successful players ===
A list of Japanese players who have won at least two gold medals at the BWF World Championships.

| Player | Category | Total | Year |
|---|---|---|---|
| Akane Yamaguchi | Women's singles | 3 | 2021, 2022, 2025 |
| Kento Momota | Men's singles | 2 | 2018, 2019 |
| Mayu Matsumoto | Women's doubles | 2 | 2018, 2019 (with Wakana Nagahara) |
| Wakana Nagahara | Women's doubles | 2 | 2018, 2019 (with Mayu Matsumoto) |

== Participation in BWF competitions ==
=== Thomas Cup ===
| Year | Round |
|---|---|
| 1949 | Did not enter |
| 1952 | Did not enter |
| 1955 | Did not qualify |
| 1958 | Did not qualify |
| 1961 | Withdrew |
| 1964 | First round inter-zone − 4th |
| 1967 | (bronze) Final round inter-zone − 3rd |
| 1970 | Did not qualify |
| 1973 | Did not qualify |
| 1976 | Did not qualify |
| 1979 | (bronze) Semi-finalists − 3rd |
| 1982 | Quarter-finalists − 5th |
| 1984 | Group stage − 7th |
| 1986 | Did not qualify |
| 1988 | Did not qualify |
| 1990 | Group stage − 5th / 6th |
| 1992 | Did not qualify |
| 1994 | Did not qualify |
| 1996 | Did not qualify |
| 1998 | Did not qualify |
| 2000 | Did not qualify |
| 2002 | Did not qualify |
| 2004 | Quarter-finalists |
| 2006 | Quarter-finalists |
| 2008 | Quarter-finalists |
| 2010 | (bronze) Semi-finalists − 3rd |
| 2012 | (bronze) Semi-finalists − 3rd |
| 2014 | (gold) Champions |
| 2016 | Quarter-finalists − 7th |
| 2018 | (silver) Runners-up − 2nd |
| 2020 | (bronze) Semi-finalists − 4th |
| 2022 | (bronze) Semi-finalists − 4th |
| 2024 | Quarter-finalists − 5th |
| 2026 | Quarter-finalists − 5th |

=== Uber Cup ===
| Year | Result |
|---|---|
| 1966 | (gold) Champions |
| 1969 | (gold) Champions |
| 1972 | (gold) Champions |
| 1975 | (silver) Runners-up |
| 1978 | (gold) Champions |
| 1981 | (gold) Champions |
| 1984 | Group stage − 7th |
| 1986 | Fourth place |
| 1988 | Fourth place |
| 1990 | (bronze) Semi-finalists |
| 1992 | Group stage − 5th / 6th |
| 1994 | Group stage − 6th |
| 1996 | Group stage − 5th |
| 1998 | Group stage − 5th |
| 2000 | Group stage − 5th |
| 2002 | Group stage − 6th |
| 2004 | (bronze) Semi-finalists |
| 2006 | Quarter-finalists |
| 2008 | Group stage − 9th |
| 2010 | (bronze) Semi-finalists |
| 2012 | (bronze) Semi-finalists |
| 2014 | (silver) Runners-up |
| 2016 | (bronze) Semi-finalists − 3rd |
| 2018 | (gold) Champions |
| 2020 | (silver) Runners-up |
| 2022 | (bronze) Semi-finalists − 3rd |
| 2024 | (bronze) Semi-finalists − 4th |
| 2026 | (bronze) Semi-finalists − 3rd |

=== Sudirman Cup ===
| Year | Result |
|---|---|
| 1989 | Group 2 − 7th |
| 1991 | Group 1 − 6th |
| 1993 | Group 2 − 9th |
| 1995 | Group 2 − 10th |
| 1997 | Group 2 − 12th |
| 1999 | Group 2 − 10th |
| 2001 | Group 2 − 8th |
| 2003 | Group 2 − 9th |
| 2005 | Group 2 − 10th |
| 2007 | Group 2 − 9th |
| 2009 | Group 1 − 7th |
| 2011 | Quarter-finalists − 5/8 |
| 2013 | Quarter-finalists − 5/8 |
| 2015 | (silver) Runners-up − 2nd |
| 2017 | (bronze) Semi-finalists − 3rd |
| 2019 | (silver) Runners-up − 2nd |
| 2021 | (silver) Runners-up − 2nd |
| 2023 | (bronze) Semi-finalists − 4th |
| 2025 | (bronze) Semi-finalists − 4th |

**Red border color indicates tournament was held on home soil.

== Participation in Badminton Asia Team Championships ==
The Japanese women's team has achieved significant success in the Asia Team Championships, winning consecutive titles in 2018 and 2020 after finishing as runners-up in the inaugural 2016 edition. The men's team reached a historic milestone in 2026 by winning their first-ever title, surpassing their previous best finish of runners-up in 2016. In the mixed team event, Japan won the inaugural tournament in 2017 and finished as runners-up in 2019.

Men's team

| Year | Result |
|---|---|
| 2016 | (silver) Runners-up |
| 2018 | Quarter-finalists |
| 2020 | (bronze) Semi-finalists |
| 2022 | Group stage |
| 2024 | (bronze) Semi-finalists |
| 2026 | (gold) Champions |

Women's team

| Year | Result |
|---|---|
| 2016 | (silver) Runners-up |
| 2018 | (gold) Champions |
| 2020 | (gold) Champions |
| 2022 | (bronze) Semi-finalists |
| 2024 | (bronze) Semi-finalists |
| 2026 | Quarter-finalists − 5th |

Mixed team

| Year | Result |
|---|---|
| 2017 | (gold) Champions |
| 2019 | (silver) Runners-up |
| 2023 | Quarter-finalists |
| 2025 | (bronze) Semi-finalists |

== Junior competitive record ==
=== World Junior Championships (Individual) ===
Japan began achieving podium finishes at the World Junior Championships in 2007, when Kenichi Tago won the team's first medal (silver) in boys' singles. The nation secured its first gold medals in 2012 through Kento Momota in boys' singles and Nozomi Okuhara in girls' singles. Akane Yamaguchi successfully defended the girls' singles title in 2013 and 2014. As of 2025, Japanese players have won a total of 10 gold medals across four disciplines, with mixed doubles being the only category in which the team has not yet claimed a title.

=== Medals table ===
As of 2025 BWF World Junior Championships

World Junior Championships all time medal table-Japan
| Events | | Gold | Silver | Bronze | Total |
|---|---|---|---|---|---|
| BS | Boys' singles | 1 | 2 | 4 | 7 |
| GS | Girls' singles | 5 | 4 | 8 | 17 |
| BD | Boys' doubles | 1 | 2 | 4 | 7 |
| GD | Girls' doubles | 3 | 0 | 6 | 9 |
| XD | Mixed doubles | 0 | 0 | 3 | 3 |
| Total | | 10 | 8 | 25 | 43 |

==== List of medalists ====
The following table lists the medalists in individual disciplines at the World Junior Championships:

| Year | Player | Category | Medal |
|---|---|---|---|
| 2007 | Kenichi Tago | Boys' singles | Silver |
| 2008 | Sayaka Sato | Girls' singles | Silver |
| 2009 | Tatsuya Watanabe | Boys' singles | Bronze |
| 2010 | Misaki Matsutomo | Girls' singles | Silver |
| 2010 | Naoko Fukuman | Girls' singles | Bronze |
| 2011 | Kento Momota | Boys' singles | Bronze |
| 2011 | Nozomi Okuhara | Girls' singles | Bronze |
| 2012 | Kento Momota | Boys' singles | Gold |
| 2012 | Nozomi Okuhara | Girls' singles | Gold |
| 2012 | Takuto Inoue; Yuki Kaneko | Boys' doubles | Silver |
| 2012 | Akane Yamaguchi | Girls' singles | Silver |
| 2012 | Aya Ohori | Girls' singles | Bronze |
| 2013 | Akane Yamaguchi | Girls' singles | Gold |
| 2013 | Aya Ohori | Girls' singles | Silver |
| 2014 | Akane Yamaguchi | Girls' singles | Gold |
| 2014 | Masahide Nakata; Katsuki Tamate | Boys' doubles | Silver |
| 2014 | Aya Ohori | Girls' singles | Bronze |
| 2014 | Yuta Watanabe; Arisa Higashino | Mixed doubles | Bronze |
| 2015 | Koki Watanabe | Boys' singles | Bronze |
| 2015 | Natsuki Nidaira | Girls' singles | Bronze |
| 2015 | Moe Araki | Girls' singles | Bronze |
| 2015 | Kenya Mitsuhashi; Yuta Watanabe | Boys' doubles | Bronze |
| 2015 | Nami Matsuyama; Chiharu Shida | Girls' doubles | Bronze |
| 2015 | Shuto Morioka; Chiharu Shida | Mixed doubles | Bronze |
| 2016 | Sayaka Hobara; Nami Matsuyama | Girls' doubles | Gold |
| 2016 | Natsuki Oie | Girls' singles | Bronze |

| Year | Player | Category | Medal |
|---|---|---|---|
| 2017 | Mahiro Kaneko; Yunosuke Kubota | Boys' doubles | Gold |
| 2017 | Kodai Naraoka | Boys' singles | Bronze |
| 2018 | Kodai Naraoka | Boys' singles | Silver |
| 2019 | Riko Gunji | Girls' singles | Gold |
| 2019 | Takuma Kawamoto; Tsubasa Kawamura | Boys' doubles | Bronze |
| 2019 | Kaho Osawa; Hinata Suzuki | Girls' doubles | Bronze |
| 2022 | Tomoka Miyazaki | Girls' singles | Gold |
| 2022 | Sorano Yoshikawa | Girls' singles | Bronze |
| 2022 | Rui Kiyama; Kanano Muroya | Girls' doubles | Bronze |
| 2022 | Kokona Ishikawa; Riko Kiyose | Girls' doubles | Bronze |
| 2023 | Maya Taguchi; Aya Tamaki | Girls' doubles | Gold |
| 2023 | Mei Sudo; Nao Yamakita | Girls' doubles | Bronze |
| 2023 | Ririna Hiramoto; Riko Kiyose | Girls' doubles | Bronze |
| 2024 | Ririna Hiramoto; Aya Tamaki | Girls' doubles | Gold |
| 2024 | Kenta Matsukawa; Yuto Nakashizu | Boys' doubles | Bronze |
| 2024 | Shuji Sawada; Aya Tamaki | Mixed doubles | Bronze |
| 2025 | Kazuma Kawano; Shuji Sawada | Boys' doubles | Bronze |
| 2026 | Saki Matsumoto | Girls' singles | Silver |
| 2026 | Mahiro Oku; Masato Yamashiro | Boys' doubles | Silver |
| 2026 | Nijika Kamata; Shizuku Kashio | Girls' doubles | Silver |

=== Suhandinata Cup ===
| Year | Round | Pos |
|---|---|---|
| 2000 | Group stage | 7th of 24 |
| 2002 | Did not enter | |
| 2004 | Group stage | 14th of 20 |
| 2006 | Group stage | 5th of 28 |
| 2007 | Group stage | 5th of 25 |
| 2008 | Group stage | 6th of 21 |
| 2009 | Group stage | 6th of 21 |
| 2010 | Group stage | 5th of 24 |
| 2011 | Group stage | 5th of 22 |
| 2012 | Runners-up | 2nd of 30 |
| 2013 | Fourth place | 4th of 30 |
| 2014 | Semi-finals | 3rd of 33 |
| 2015 | Fourth place | 4th of 39 |
| 2016 | Semi-finals | 3rd of 52 |
| 2017 | Semi-finals | 3rd of 44 |
| 2018 | Semi-finals | 3rd of 39 |
| 2019 | Semi-finals | 3rd of 43 |
| 2020 | Cancelled because of COVID-19 pandemic | |
| 2021 | Cancelled because of COVID-19 pandemic | |
| 2022 | Semi-finals | 3rd of 37 |
| 2023 | Quarter-finals | 5th of 38 |
| 2024 | Semi-finals | 3rd of 39 |
| 2025 | Semi-finals | 3rd of 36 |
| 2026 | Quarter-finals | 7th of 47 |

=== Asian Junior Team Championships ===
==== Boys' team ====
| Year | Result |
|---|---|
| 1997 | Quarter-finalists |
| 1998 | Quarter-finalists − 5th |
| 1999 | Quarter-finalists |
| 2000 | Quarter-finalists |
| 2001 | Quarter-finalists |
| 2002 | Quarter-finalists |
| 2004 | Quarter-finalists |
| 2005 | Quarter-finalists |

==== Girls' teams ====
| Year | Result |
|---|---|
| 1997 | (bronze) Semi-finalists |
| 1998 | Quarter-finalists − 5th |
| 1999 | Quarter-finalists |
| 2000 | (bronze) Semi-finalists |
| 2001 | Quarter-finalists |
| 2002 | (bronze) Semi-finalists |
| 2004 | Quarter-finalists |
| 2005 | Quarter-finalists |

==== Mixed team ====
| Year | Result |
|---|---|
| 2006 | Quarter-finalists |
| 2007 | (bronze) Semi-finalists |
| 2008 | Quarter-finalists |
| 2009 | (bronze) Semi-finalists |
| 2010 | Group stage |
| 2011 | Quarter-finalists |
| 2012 | (gold) Champions |
| 2013 | (bronze) Semi-finalists |
| 2014 | (bronze) Semi-finalists |
| 2015 | (bronze) Semi-finalists |
| 2016 | (bronze) Semi-finalists |
| 2017 | (bronze) Semi-finalists |
| 2018 | (silver) Runner-up |
| 2019 | Quarter-finalists |
| 2023 | (gold) Champions |
| 2024 | Quarter-finalists - 7th of 15 |
| 2025 | (bronze) Semi-finalists |
| 2026 | (bronze) Semi-finalists |

== Team structure and selection ==
The composition of the Japan national team is determined by the Badminton Association of Japan (BAJ). The national squad is divided into three primary categories:

=== Squad divisions ===
1. National Team: The primary squad of approximately 32 players, with a maximum of 4 players in singles disciplines and 4 pairs in each doubles discipline.
2. U-24 National Team: A developmental squad for players under 24 years of age, mirroring the main National Team structure with approximately 32 players.
3. Junior National Team: Further divided into U-19, U-17, U-15, and U-13 squads to nurture younger talent.

=== Selection criteria ===
To be eligible for the National Team, athletes must hold Japanese nationality. Selection is generally based on meeting one of the following criteria:

1. Domestic Performance: Winners of the All Japan Championships in singles, doubles, and mixed doubles.
2. Japan Ranking: Players ranked first in the Japan Ranking released after the All Japan Championships.
3. International Achievements: Olympics medalists or World Championships gold medalists during the fiscal year.
4. World Ranking: The highest-ranked Japanese player or pair within the top 8 of the BWF World Ranking following the All Japan Championships.
5. Association Recommendation: Players selected based on comprehensive evaluation of performance and future potential.

Selection for the U-24 National Team is primarily based on recommendations by the coaching staff, prioritizing players with high future potential who meet the age requirements.

== Players ==
=== Current squad ===
As of 30 October 2026

==== Men's team ====
| Name | DoB/Age | Ranking of event | | |
| Name | DoB/Age | MS | MD | XD |
|---|---|---|---|---|
| Kodai Naraoka | 30 June 2001 (age 25) | 9 | - | - |
| Koki Watanabe | 29 January 1999 (age 27) | 15 | - | - |
| Yushi Tanaka | 5 October 1999 (age 27) | 17 | - | - |
| Kenta Nishimoto | 30 August 1994 (age 32) | 30 | - | - |
| Takuro Hoki | 14 August 1995 (age 31) | - | 14 | - |
| Yugo Kobayashi | 10 July 1995 (age 31) | - | 14 | - |
| Kakeru Kumagai | 5 January 2002 (age 24) | - | 17 | - |
| Hiroki Nishi | 21 March 2003 (age 23) | - | 17 | - |
| Hiroki Okamura | 6 December 1998 (age 27) | - | 27 | - |
| Kyohei Yamashita | 12 October 1998 (age 28) | - | 27 | - |
| Takumi Nomura | 7 August 1997 (age 29) | - | 33 | - |
| Yuichi Shimogami | 5 March 1998 (age 28) | - | 33 | 17 |
| Akira Koga | 8 March 1994 (age 32) | - | - | 15 |
| Hiroki Midorikawa | 17 May 2000 (age 26) | - | - | 87 |

==== Women's team ====
| Name | DoB/Age | Ranking of event | | |
| Name | DoB/Age | WS | WD | XD |
|---|---|---|---|---|
| Akane Yamaguchi | 6 June 1997 (age 29) | 2 | - | - |
| Tomoka Miyazaki | 17 August 2006 (age 20) | 7 | - | - |
| Riko Gunji | 31 July 2002 (age 24) | 20 | - | - |
| Manami Suizu | 8 October 2003 (age 23) | 59 | - | - |
| Yuki Fukushima | 6 May 1993 (age 33) | - | 3 | - |
| Mayu Matsumoto | 7 August 1995 (age 31) | - | 3 | - |
| Rin Iwanaga | 21 May 1999 (age 27) | - | 5 | - |
| Kie Nakanishi | 24 December 1995 (age 30) | - | 5 | - |
| Sumire Nakade | 28 February 2004 (age 22) | - | 11 | - |
| Miyu Takahashi | 15 May 2002 (age 24) | - | 11 | - |
| Hinata Suzuki | 26 March 2002 (age 24) | - | 13 | - |
| Nao Yamakita | 30 October 2005 (age 21) | - | 13 | - |
| Rui Hirokami | 26 July 2002 (age 24) | - | 15 | - |
| Sayaka Hobara | 30 July 1998 (age 28) | - | 15 | 17 |
| Natsu Saito | 9 June 2000 (age 26) | - | - | 15 |
| Nami Matsuyama | 28 June 1998 (age 28) | - | - | 87 |

==== U-24 team ====
| Name | DoB/Age | Ranking of event | | | |
| Name | DoB/Age | MS | WS | MD | WD |
|---|---|---|---|---|---|
| Yudai Okimoto | 28 May 2005 (age 21) | 21 | - | - | - |
| Riki Takei | 21 July 2003 (age 23) | 90 | - | - | - |
| Rei Miyashita | 2 February 2004 (age 22) | 151 | - | - | - |
| Hyuga Takano | 9 August 2007 (age 19) | 178 | - | - | - |
| Hina Akechi | 14 March 2005 (age 21) | - | 17 | - | - |
| Nayu Shirakawa | 2 November 2007 (age 19) | - | 178 | - | - |
| Yuzuno Watanabe | 9 January 2010 (age 16) | - | 318 | - | - |
| Haruki Kawabe | 10 March 2005 (age 21) | - | - | 58 | - |
| Kenta Matsukawa | 19 June 2006 (age 20) | - | - | 58 | - |
| Shuntaro Mezaki | 27 June 2002 (age 24) | - | - | 83 | - |
| Yuta Oku | 3 February 2004 (age 22) | - | - | 83 | - |
| Kazuya Minamoto | 30 November 2004 (age 21) | - | - | 351 | - |
| Osuke Sakurai | 2 December 2004 (age 21) | - | - | 351 | - |
| Nanako Hara | 31 March 2006 (age 20) | - | - | - | 52 |
| Riko Kiyose | 16 July 2005 (age 21) | - | - | - | 52 |
| Mikoto Aiso | 10 January 2007 (age 19) | - | - | - | 82 |
| Momoha Niimi | 21 March 2005 (age 21) | - | - | - | 82 |
| Nijika Kamata | 26 July 2009 (age 17) | - | - | - | 232 |
| Maya Taguchi | 9 October 2005 (age 21) | - | - | - | 232 |

== Coaching staff ==
As of 29 January 2026

| Role | Name |
|---|---|
| Head coach | (Japan) Hitoshi Ōhori |
| Men's single | (Japan) Shō Sasaki (Japan) Kazumasa Sakai |
| Women's single | (Japan) Takako Ida (Japan) Shōji Satō |
| Men's doubles | (Malaysia) Lee Wan Wah (Japan) Hiroyuki Endo |
| Women's doubles | (Japan) Kei Nakashima (Japan) Mizuki Fujii |
| Mixed doubles | (Japan) Norio Imai (Japan) Noriyasu Hirata |

- Players & Staffs (2025), badminton.or.jp
