= 2003 IBF World Championships – Women's doubles =

Badminton championship results

Women's doubles at the 2003 IBF World Championships
- Venue: National Indoor Arena
- Location: Birmingham, United Kingdom
- Dates: July 28, 2003 – August 3, 2003

Medalists
gold medal	Gao Ling; Huang Sui	China
silver medal	Wei Yili; Zhao Tingting	China
bronze medal	Shizuka Yamamoto; Seiko Yamada	Japan
bronze medal	Rikke Olsen; Ann-Lou Jørgensen	Denmark

The 2003 IBF World Championships (World Badminton Championships) took place in the National Indoor Arena in Birmingham, England, between July 28 and August 3, 2003. Following the results in the women's doubles.

== Main stage ==
=== Section 1 ===
First round
(China) Gao Ling (China) Huang Sui
bye
(Indonesia) Sukma Wijaya Devi (Indonesia) Lilyana Natsir
bye
(Chinese Taipei) Cheng Wen-Hsing (Chinese Taipei) Chien Yu-Chin
bye
(India) Jwala Gutta (India) Shruti Kurian	17	15
(Sweden) Elin Bergblom (Sweden) Johanna Persson	16	6
(China) Yang Wei (China) Zhang Jiewen
bye
(Germany) Carina Mette (Germany) Kathrin Piotrowski
bye
(South Korea) Lee Kyung-won (South Korea) Ra Kyung-min
bye
(Russia) Natalia Gorodnicheva (Russia) Elena Sukhareva	15	15
(Slovenia) Maja Pohar (Slovenia) Maja Tvrdy	5	0

Second round
(China) Gao Ling (China) Huang Sui	15	15
(Indonesia) Sukma Wijaya Devi (Indonesia) Lilyana Natsir	3	1
(Chinese Taipei) Cheng Wen-Hsing (Chinese Taipei) Chien Yu-Chin	15	15
(India) Jwala Gutta (India) Shruti Kurian	8	6
(China) Yang Wei (China) Zhang Jiewen	15	15
(Germany) Carina Mette (Germany) Kathrin Piotrowski	2	7
(South Korea) Lee Kyung-won (South Korea) Ra Kyung-min	15	15
(Russia) Natalia Gorodnicheva (Russia) Elena Sukhareva	5	0

Third round
(China) Gao Ling (China) Huang Sui	15	15
(Chinese Taipei) Cheng Wen-Hsing (Chinese Taipei) Chien Yu-Chin	9	1
(China) Yang Wei (China) Zhang Jiewen	15	15
(South Korea) Lee Kyung-won (South Korea) Ra Kyung-min	10	6

Quarterfinals
(China) Gao Ling (China) Huang Sui	15	15
(China) Yang Wei (China) Zhang Jiewen	11	3

=== Section 2 ===
First round
(Denmark) Rikke Olsen (Denmark) Ann-Lou Jørgensen
bye
(Switzerland) Judith Baumeyer (Switzerland) Fabienne Baumeyer
bye
(Bulgaria) Neli Boteva (Bulgaria) Petya Nedeltcheva	15	15
(Romania) Alexandra-Gabriela Olariu (Romania) Florentina Petre	0	0
(Wales) Felicity Gallup (Wales) Joanne Muggeridge
bye
(Japan) Chikako Nakayama (Japan) Keiko Yoshitomi
bye
(Canada) Helen Nichol (Canada) Charmaine Reid
bye
(England) Ella Tripp (England) Joanne Wright
bye
(France) Tatiana Vattier (France) Victoria Wright	15	15
(Ukraine) Natalia Golovkina (Ukraine) Larisa Griga	9	5

Second round
(Denmark) Rikke Olsen (Denmark) Ann-Lou Jørgensen	15	15
(Switzerland) Judith Baumeyer (Switzerland) Fabienne Baumeyer	4	3
(Bulgaria) Neli Boteva (Bulgaria) Petya Nedeltcheva	15	15
(Wales) Felicity Gallup (Wales) Joanne Muggeridge	10	5
(Japan) Chikako Nakayama (Japan) Keiko Yoshitomi	15	15
(Canada) Helen Nichol (Canada) Charmaine Reid	4	3
(England) Ella Tripp (England) Joanne Wright	15	15
(France) Tatiana Vattier (France) Victoria Wright	7	1

Third round
(Denmark) Rikke Olsen (Denmark) Ann-Lou Jørgensen	15	15
(Bulgaria) Neli Boteva (Bulgaria) Petya Nedeltcheva	13	6
(Japan) Chikako Nakayama (Japan) Keiko Yoshitomi	10	15	15
(England) Ella Tripp (England) Joanne Wright	15	10	12

Quarterfinals
(Denmark) Rikke Olsen (Denmark) Ann-Lou Jørgensen	15	8	15
(Japan) Chikako Nakayama (Japan) Keiko Yoshitomi	2	15	7

=== Section 3 ===
First round
(China) Wei Yili (China) Zhao Tingting
bye
(Hong Kong) Louisa Koon Wai Chee (Hong Kong) Li Wing Mui
bye
(South Korea) Hwang Yu-mi (South Korea) Lee Hyo-jung
bye
(England) Gail Emms (England) Donna Kellogg
(Russia) Elena Shimko (Russia) Marina Yakusheva
(Indonesia) Jo Novita (Indonesia) Lita Nurlita
bye
(China) Chen Lin (China) Jiang Xuelian	15	13	15
(Malaysia) Chin Eei Hui (Malaysia) Wong Pei Tty	2	15	13
(Denmark) Pernille Harder (Denmark) Mette Schjoldager
bye
(Finland) Nina Weckström (Finland) Anu Weckström
bye

Second round
(China) Wei Yili (China) Zhao Tingting	15	15
(Hong Kong) Louisa Koon Wai Chee (Hong Kong) Li Wing Mui	3	2
(South Korea) Hwang Yu-mi (South Korea) Lee Hyo-jung	15	15
(England) Gail Emms (England) Donna Kellogg	5	7
(Indonesia) Jo Novita (Indonesia) Lita Nurlita	9	17	17
(China) Chen Lin (China) Jiang Xuelian	15	15	14
(Denmark) Pernille Harder (Denmark) Mette Schjoldager	15	15
(Finland) Nina Weckström (Finland) Anu Weckström	7	1

Third round
(China) Wei Yili (China) Zhao Tingting	15	15
(South Korea) Hwang Yu-mi (South Korea) Lee Hyo-jung	9	9
(Indonesia) Jo Novita (Indonesia) Lita Nurlita	15	15
(Denmark) Pernille Harder (Denmark) Mette Schjoldager	9	12

Quarterfinals
(China) Wei Yili (China) Zhao Tingting	15	15
(Indonesia) Jo Novita (Indonesia) Lita Nurlita	3	10

=== Section 4 ===
First round
(Japan) Shizuka Yamamoto (Japan) Seiko Yamada
bye
(Canada) Denyse Julien (Canada) Florence Lavoie
bye
(Germany) Nicole Grether (Germany) Juliane Schenk
bye
(Wales) Robyn Ashworth (Wales) Harriet Johnson	15	15
(Greece) Chrisa Georgali (Greece) Christina Mavromatidou	6	11
(Netherlands) Mia Audina (Netherlands) Lotte Bruil-Jonathans
bye
(Canada) Amelie Felx (Canada) Valerie Loker
bye
(Scotland) Kirsteen McEwan (Scotland) Yuan Wemyss
bye
(England) Liza Parker (England) Suzanne Rayappan	15	15
(Slovenia) Spela Silvester (Slovenia) Urska Silvester	7	3

Second round
(Japan) Shizuka Yamamoto (Japan) Seiko Yamada
(Canada) Denyse Julien (Canada) Florence Lavoie
(Germany) Nicole Grether (Germany) Juliane Schenk	15	15
(Wales) Robyn Ashworth (Wales) Harriet Johnson	2	8
(Netherlands) Mia Audina (Netherlands) Lotte Bruil-Jonathans	15	15
(Canada) Amelie Felx (Canada) Valerie Loker	0	1
(Scotland) Kirsteen McEwan (Scotland) Yuan Wemyss	15	5	15
(England) Liza Parker (England) Suzanne Rayappan	9	15	9

Third round
(Japan) Shizuka Yamamoto (Japan) Seiko Yamada	15	15
(Germany) Nicole Grether (Germany) Juliane Schenk	7	12
(Netherlands) Mia Audina (Netherlands) Lotte Bruil-Jonathans	15	15
(Scotland) Kirsteen McEwan (Scotland) Yuan Wemyss	6	10

Quarterfinals
(Japan) Shizuka Yamamoto (Japan) Seiko Yamada	15	15
(Netherlands) Mia Audina (Netherlands) Lotte Bruil-Jonathans	9	8

== Final stage ==
Quarterfinals
3	(China) Gao Ling (China) Huang Sui	15	15
(China) Yang Wei (China) Zhang Jiewen	11	3
2	(Denmark) Rikke Olsen (Denmark) Ann-Lou Jørgensen	15	8	15
(Japan) Chikako Nakayama (Japan) Keiko Yoshitomi	2	15	7
1	(China) Wei Yili (China) Zhao Tingting	15	15
(Indonesia) Jo Novita (Indonesia) Lita Nurlita	3	10
8	(Japan) Shizuka Yamamoto (Japan) Seiko Yamada	15	15
(Netherlands) Mia Audina (Netherlands) Lotte Bruil-Jonathans	9	8

Semifinals
3	(China) Gao Ling (China) Huang Sui	15	8	15
2	(Denmark) Rikke Olsen (Denmark) Ann-Lou Jørgensen	2	15	7
1	(China) Wei Yili (China) Zhao Tingting	15	15
8	(Japan) Shizuka Yamamoto (Japan) Seiko Yamada	9	11

Finals
3	(China) Gao Ling (China) Huang Sui	15	15
1	(China) Wei Yili (China) Zhao Tingting	8	11
