= 2014 Asian Junior Badminton Championships – Boys doubles =

Tournament details
- Dates: 19 – 23 February 2014
- Edition: 17
- Venue: Taipei Gymnasium
- Location: Taipei, Taiwan

The Boys' Doubles tournament of the 2014 Asian Junior Badminton Championships was held from February 19–23 in Taipei, Taiwan. The defending champion of the last edition were the Chinese pair Li Junhui and Liu Yuchen. Last year finalist Huang Kaixiang / Zheng Siwei who standing in the first seeded this year, emerge as the champion after beat the South Korean pair the second seeded Kim Jae-hwan / Kim Jung-ho in the finals with the score 21–16, 21–14. Japanese pairs Kenya Mitsuhashi / Yuta Watanabe and Hashiru Shimono / Kanta Tsuneyama finished in the semi-finals round, settle for the bronze medal.

== Seeded ==
1. (China) Huang Kaixiang / Zheng Siwei (champion)
2. (South Korea) Kim Jae-hwan / Kim Jung-ho (final)
3. (South Korea) Choi Jong-woo / Seo Seung-jae (third round)
4. (Thailand) Ketlen Kittinupong / Dechapol Puavaranukroh (third round)
5. (Hong Kong) Yonny Chung / Yeung Shing Choi (third round)
6. (Malaysia) Chua Khek Wei / Ng Di Hua (third round)
7. (Singapore) Ngiam Bin / Tan Ming Shun (second round)
8. (Vietnam) Do Tuan Duc / Pham Cao Cuong (third round)

== Draw ==
=== Finals ===
Quarterfinals
1 | (China) Huang Kaixiang (China) Zheng Siwei | 21 | 21
(Chinese Taipei) Po Li-wei (Chinese Taipei) Yang Ming-tse | 5 | 18
(Japan) Kenya Mitsuhashi (Japan) Yuta Watanabe | 27 | 16 | 21
(Indonesia) Althof Baariq (Indonesia) Reinard Dhanriano | 25 | 21 | 12
(Japan) Hashiru Shimono (Japan) Kanta Tsuneyama | 21 | 21
(Indonesia) Muhammad Rian Ardianto (Indonesia) Clinton Hendrik Kudamassa | 13 | 18
(Chinese Taipei) Lee Chia-han (Chinese Taipei) Wu Yuan-cheng | 22 | 16 | 15
2 | (South Korea) Kim Jae-hwan (South Korea) Kim Jung-ho | 20 | 21 | 21

Semifinals
1 | (China) Huang Kaixiang (China) Zheng Siwei | 21 | 21
(Japan) Kenya Mitsuhashi (Japan) Yuta Watanabe | 10 | 8
(Japan) Hashiru Shimono (Japan) Kanta Tsuneyama | 16 | 17
2 | (South Korea) Kim Jae-hwan (South Korea) Kim Jung-ho | 21 | 21

Final
1 | (China) Huang Kaixiang (China) Zheng Siwei | 21 | 21
2 | (South Korea) Kim Jae-hwan (South Korea) Kim Jung-ho | 16 | 14

=== Top Half ===
==== Section 1 ====
First Round
1 | (China) Huang KX (China) Zheng SW
BYE
(Chinese Taipei) Lee H-m (Chinese Taipei) Lin Y-s
BYE
(Syria) A Al Jallad (Syria) M Aram
BYE
(Chinese Taipei) Lo K-h (Chinese Taipei) Tien Y
BYE

Second Round
1 | (China) Huang KX (China) Zheng SW | 21 | 21
(Chinese Taipei) Lee H-m (Chinese Taipei) Lin Y-s | 13 | 17
(Syria) A Al Jallad (Syria) M Aram | wo
(Chinese Taipei) Lo K-h (Chinese Taipei) Tien Y

Third Round
1 | (China) Huang KX (China) Zheng SW | 21 | 21
(Chinese Taipei) Lo K-h (Chinese Taipei) Tien Y | 8 | 12

==== Section 2 ====
First Round
5 | (Hong Kong) Y Chung (Hong Kong) Yeung SC
BYE
(Japan) M Nakata (Japan) K Tamate
BYE
(Philippines) C Bernardo (Philippines) V Manuel
BYE
(Chinese Taipei) Po L-w (Chinese Taipei) Yang M-t | 21 | 21
(Thailand) S Jomkoh (Thailand) K Likitanurucks | 19 | 13

Second Round
5 | (Hong Kong) Y Chung (Hong Kong) Yeung SC | 21 | 13 | 21
(Japan) M Nakata (Japan) K Tamate | 15 | 21 | 15
(Philippines) C Bernardo (Philippines) V Manuel | 21 | 11 | 15
(Chinese Taipei) Po L-w (Chinese Taipei) Yang M-t | 19 | 21 | 21

Third Round
5 | (Hong Kong) Y Chung (Hong Kong) Yeung SC | 16 | 21 | 18
(Chinese Taipei) Po L-w (Chinese Taipei) Yang M-t | 21 | 19 | 21

==== Section 3 ====
First Round
3 | (South Korea) Choi J-w (South Korea) Seo S-j
BYE
(South Korea) Kang H-s (South Korea) Park K-h
BYE
(Macau) J Lo (Macau) Tai KH
BYE
(Sri Lanka) D Alahakoon (Sri Lanka) P Ambegoda | 8 | 8
(Japan) K Mitsuhashi (Japan) Y Watanabe | 21 | 21

Second Round
3 | (South Korea) Choi J-w (South Korea) Seo S-j | 21 | 21
(South Korea) Kang H-s (South Korea) Park K-h | 19 | 18
(Macau) J Lo (Macau) Tai KH | 4 | 5
(Japan) K Mitsuhashi (Japan) Y Watanabe | 21 | 21

Third Round
3 | (South Korea) Choi J-w (South Korea) Seo S-j | 21 | 19 | 17
(Japan) K Mitsuhashi (Japan) Y Watanabe | 19 | 21 | 21

==== Section 4 ====
First Round
7 | (Singapore) Ngiam B (Singapore) Tan MS
BYE
(Indonesia) A Baariq (Indonesia) R Dhanriano
BYE
(India) Arjun M.R. (India) C Shetty
BYE
(Indonesia) Y Saputra (Indonesia) T Supriadi | 21 | 21
(Malaysia) Sim GZ (Malaysia) Tan JH | 11 | 17

Second Round
7 | (Singapore) Ngiam B (Singapore) Tan MS | 13 | 14
(Indonesia) A Baariq (Indonesia) R Dhanriano | 21 | 21
(India) Arjun M.R. (India) C Shetty | 22 | 12 | 21
(Indonesia) Y Saputra (Indonesia) T Supriadi | 20 | 21 | 19

Third Round
(Indonesia) A Baariq (Indonesia) R Dhanriano | 12 | 21 | 21
(India) Arjun M.R. (India) C Shetty | 21 | 18 | 15

=== Bottom Half ===
==== Section 5 ====
First Round
(Japan) H Shimono (Japan) K Tsuneyama | 21 | 21
(Philippines) P Monterubio (Philippines) A Morada | 15 | 11
BYE
(India) R Kapoor (India) C Sen
(Chinese Taipei) Chang H-w (Chinese Taipei) Lin S-k | 21 | 21
(Malaysia) Chen JH (Malaysia) Goh SF | 14 | 17
BYE
6 | (Malaysia) Chua KW (Malaysia) Ng DH

Second Round
(Japan) H Shimono (Japan) K Tsuneyama | 21 | 21
(India) R Kapoor (India) C Sen | 13 | 19
(Chinese Taipei) Chang H-w (Chinese Taipei) Lin S-k | 15 | 22
6 | (Malaysia) Chua KW (Malaysia) Ng DH | 21 | 24

Third Round
(Japan) H Shimono (Japan) K Tsuneyama | 21 | 21
6 | (Malaysia) Chua KW (Malaysia) Ng DH | 16 | 15

==== Section 6 ====
First Round
(Philippines) J Deato (Philippines) P Gonzalez | 15 | 9
(China) Yao ZD (China) Zhao J | 21 | 21
BYE
(Indonesia) R Ardianto (Indonesia) C Kudamassa
BYE
(China) He JT (China) Xu LH
BYE
4 | (Thailand) K Kittinupong (Thailand) D Puavaranukroh

Second Round
(China) Yao ZD (China) Zhao J | 18 | 18
(Indonesia) R Ardianto (Indonesia) C Kudamassa | 21 | 21
(China) He JT (China) Xu LH | 21 | 14 | 10
4 | (Thailand) K Kittinupong (Thailand) D Puavaranukroh | 17 | 21 | 21

Third Round
(Indonesia) R Ardianto (Indonesia) C Kudamassa | 21 | 21
4 | (Thailand) K Kittinupong (Thailand) D Puavaranukroh | 17 | 16

==== Section 7 ====
First Round
(Sri Lanka) N De Silva (Sri Lanka) S Rajapakse | 6 | 7
(Chinese Taipei) Lee C-h (Chinese Taipei) Wu Y-c | 21 | 21
BYE
(Thailand) C Charoenkitamorn (Thailand) K Tantianankul
BYE
(Uzbekistan) A Bakhshulaev (Uzbekistan) A Khodjaev
BYE
8 | (Vietnam) Do TD (Vietnam) Pham CC

Second Round
(Chinese Taipei) Lee C-h (Chinese Taipei) Wu Y-c | 25 | 21
(Thailand) C Charoenkitamorn (Thailand) K Tantianankul | 23 | 17
(Uzbekistan) A Bakhshulaev (Uzbekistan) A Khodjaev | 7 | 9
8 | (Vietnam) Do TD (Vietnam) Pham CC | 21 | 21

Third Round
(Chinese Taipei) Lee C-h (Chinese Taipei) Wu Y-c | 21 | 21
8 | (Vietnam) Do TD (Vietnam) Pham CC | 18 | 5

==== Section 8 ====
First Round
(Sri Lanka) P Ranaweera (Sri Lanka) B Yatawara | 19 | 18
(Singapore) R Ng (Singapore) B Ong | 21 | 21
BYE
(Macau) Iek UI (Macau) Lou HM
BYE
(Hong Kong) Lee CW (Hong Kong) Li KH
BYE
2 | (South Korea) Kim J-h (South Korea) Kim J-h

Second Round
(Singapore) R Ng (Singapore) B Ong | 21 | 21
(Macau) Iek UI (Macau) Lou HM | 11 | 8
(Hong Kong) Lee CW (Hong Kong) Li KH | 16 | 18
2 | (South Korea) Kim J-h (South Korea) Kim J-h | 21 | 21

Third Round
(Singapore) R Ng (Singapore) B Ong | 11 | 6
2 | (South Korea) Kim J-h (South Korea) Kim J-h | 21 | 21
