= Yoshiko Iwata =

Japanese badminton player

Personal information
- Born: 27 March 1971 (age 55) Osaka Prefecture, Japan
- Height: 1.61 m (5 ft 3 in)
- Weight: 60 kg (132 lb)

Sport
- Country: Japan
- Sport: Badminton
- Handedness: Right
- Event: Women's doubles

Women's doubles
- BWF profile
Medal record
Women's badminton
Representing Japan
Asian Games
Bronze medal – third place	1998 Bangkok	Women's team
Asian Championships
Bronze medal – third place	1992 Kuala Lumpur	Women's doubles

Yoshiko Iwata (岩田 良子, Iwata Yoshiko; born 27 March 1971) is a former Japanese badminton player from the Yonex team. Iwata graduated from the Shijonawate Gakuen Junior College. she competed at the Summer Olympics in Sydney, Australia. Iwata was the women's doubles champion at the National Championships in 1996 and 1998. She won some international tournament in Australia, Cuba, Guatemala, and Carebaco in 2003, also in Peru in 2004. She was selected as Yonex badminton manager in 2010.

== Achievements ==
=== Asian Championships ===
Women's doubles
Year	Venue	Partner	Opponent	Score	Result
1992	Cheras Indoor Stadium; Kuala Lumpur, Malaysia	(Japan) Fujimi Tamura	(Thailand) Ladawan Mulasartsatorn (Thailand) Piyathip Sansaniyakulvilai	8–15, 8–15	Bronze

=== IBF World Grand Prix ===
The World Badminton Grand Prix sanctioned by International Badminton Federation (IBF) since 1983.

Women's doubles
Year	Tournament	Partner	Opponent	Score	Result	Ref.
1997	Chinese Taipei Open	(Japan) Haruko Matsuda	(South Korea) Park Soo-yun (South Korea) Yim Kyung-jin	2–15, 8–15	(silver) Runner-up	
1997	U.S. Open	(Japan) Haruko Matsuda	(China) Qin Yiyuan (China) Tang Yongshu	6–15, 2–15	(silver) Runner-up	
1997	Denmark Open	(Japan) Haruko Matsuda	(Denmark) Ann Jørgensen (Denmark) Majken Vange	16–18, 5–15	(silver) Runner-up	
2000	Swedish Open	(Japan) Haruko Matsuda	(Denmark) Jane F. Bramsen (Denmark) Pernille Harder	12–15, 15–17	(silver) Runner-up	
2000	Polish Open	(Japan) Haruko Matsuda	(Denmark) Britta Andersen (Denmark) Lene Mørk	15–4, 15–10	(gold) Winner	
2000	German Open	(Japan) Haruko Matsuda	(China) Lu Ying (China) Huang Sui	5–15, 3–15	(silver) Runner-up	
2003	U.S. Open	(Japan) Miyuki Tai	(South Korea) Ha Jung-eun (South Korea) Lee Eun-woo	15–5, 15–4	(gold) Winner	

=== IBF International ===
Women's doubles
Year	Tournament	Partner	Opponent	Score	Result	Ref.
2002	Macau Satellite	(Japan) Miyuki Tai	(China) Wang Xin (China) Yuan Ting	11–7, 9–11, 6–11	(silver) Runner-up	
2003	French International	(Japan) Miyuki Tai	(Russia) Elena Shimko (Russia) Marina Yakusheva	11–1, 7–11, 11–9	(gold) Winner	
2003	Cuba International	(Japan) Miyuki Tai	(Canada) Helen Nichol (Canada) Charmaine Reid	15–6, 15–4	(gold) Winner	
2003	Croatian International	(Japan) Miyuki Tai	(Poland) Kamila Augustyn (Poland) Nadieżda Kostiuczyk	11–8, 11–8	(gold) Winner	
2003	South Africa International	(Japan) Miyuki Tai	(Japan) Chikako Nakayama (Japan) Keiko Yoshitomi	15–4, 4–15, 5–15	(silver) Runner-up	
2003	Carebaco International	(Japan) Miyuki Tai	(Canada) Helen Nichol (Canada) Charmaine Reid	15–5, 15–5	(gold) Winner	
2003	Ballarat International	(Japan) Miyuki Tai	(Australia) Jane Crabtree (Australia) Kate Wilson-Smith	15–4, 15–6	(gold) Winner	
2003	Southern Pan Am Classic	(Japan) Miyuki Tai	(Wales) Felicity Gallup (Wales) Joanne Muggeridge	15–2, 15–4	(gold) Winner	
2003	Guatemala International	(Japan) Miyuki Tai	(Wales) Felicity Gallup (Wales) Joanne Muggeridge	15–12, 15–1	(gold) Winner	
2004	Swedish International	(Japan) Miyuki Tai	(Poland) Kamila Augustyn (Poland) Nadieżda Kostiuczyk	5–15, 3–15	(silver) Runner-up	
2004	Iran Fajr International	(Japan) Miyuki Tai	(Singapore) Jiang Yanmei (Singapore) Li Yujia	4–15, 12–15	(silver) Runner-up	
2004	Peru International	(Japan) Miyuki Tai	(Canada) Helen Nichol (Canada) Charmaine Reid	15–3, 6–15, 15–8	(gold) Winner	
