= Miyuki Tai =

Japanese badminton player (born 1980)

Personal information
- Born: 24 March 1980 (age 46) Ishikawa Prefecture, Japan
- Height: 165 cm (5 ft 5 in)

Sport
- Country: Japan
- Sport: Badminton
- Handedness: Right
- Event: Doubles

Doubles
- BWF profile

Miyuki Tai (Japanese: 田井 美幸, romanized: Tai Miyuki; born 24 March 1980) is a retired Japanese badminton player from NTT East Club.

== Achievements ==
=== IBF Grand Prix ===
The World Badminton Grand Prix sanctioned by International Badminton Federation (IBF) since 1983.

Women's doubles
Year	Tournament	Partner	Opponent	Score	Result
2003	U.S. Open	(Japan) Yoshiko Iwata	(South Korea) Ha Jung-eun (South Korea) Lee Eun-woo	15–5, 15–4	(gold) Winner

=== IBF International ===
Women's doubles
Year	Tournament	Partner	Opponent	Score	Result
2005	Pan Am International	(Japan) Noriko Okuma	(Canada) Denyse Julien (Canada) Milaine Cloutier	Walkover	(gold) Winner
2005	Peru International	(Japan) Noriko Okuma	(Canada) Charmaine Reid (Canada) Helen Nichol	15–4, 15–5	(gold) Winner
2005	USA SCBA International	(Japan) Noriko Okuma	(United States) Johanna Lee (United States) Peng Yun	11–15, 15–13, 11–15	(silver) Runner-up
2005	Swedish International	(Japan) Noriko Okuma	(Russia) Nina Vislova (Russia) Valeria Sorokina	15–2, 15–4	(gold) Winner
2004	Western Australia International	(Japan) Noriko Okuma	(Malaysia) Fong Chew Yen (Malaysia) Chor Hooi Yee	15–7, 15–11	(gold) Winner
2004	Canterbury International	(Japan) Noriko Okuma	(New Zealand) Rachel Hindley (New Zealand) Rebecca Gordon	15–2, 15–7	(gold) Winner
2004	Peru International	(Japan) Yoshiko Iwata	(Canada) Helen Nichol (Canada) Charmaine Reid	15–3, 6–15, 15–8	(gold) Winner
2004	Iran Fajr International	(Japan) Yoshiko Iwata	(Singapore) Jiang Yanmei (Singapore) Li Yujia	4–15, 12–15	(silver) Runner-up
2004	Swedish International	(Japan) Yoshiko Iwata	(Poland) Kamila Augustyn (Poland) Nadieżda Kostiuczyk	5–15, 3–15	(silver) Runner-up
2003	Guatemala International	(Japan) Yoshiko Iwata	(Wales) Felicity Gallup (Wales) Joanne Muggeridge	15–12, 15–1	(gold) Winner
2003	Southern Pan Am Classic	(Japan) Yoshiko Iwata	(Wales) Felicity Gallup (Wales) Joanne Muggeridge	15–2, 15–4	(gold) Winner
2003	Ballarat International	(Japan) Yoshiko Iwata	(Australia) Jane Crabtree (Australia) Kate Wilson-Smith	15–4, 15–6	(gold) Winner
2003	Carebaco International	(Japan) Yoshiko Iwata	(Canada) Helen Nichol (Canada) Charmaine Reid	15–5, 15–5	(gold) Winner
2003	South Africa International	(Japan) Yoshiko Iwata	(Japan) Chikako Nakayama (Japan) Keiko Yoshitomi	15–4, 4–15, 5–15	(silver) Runner-up
2003	Croatian International	(Japan) Yoshiko Iwata	(Poland) Kamila Augustyn (Poland) Nadieżda Kostiuczyk	11–8, 11–8	(gold) Winner
2003	Cuba International	(Japan) Yoshiko Iwata	(Canada) Helen Nichol (Canada) Charmaine Reid	15–6, 15–4	(gold) Winner
2003	French International	(Japan) Yoshiko Iwata	(Russia) Elena Shimko (Russia) Marina Yakusheva	11–1, 7–11, 11–9	(gold) Winner
2002	Macau Satellite	(Japan) Yoshiko Iwata	(China) Wang Xin (China) Yuan Ting	11–7, 9–11, 6–11	(silver) Runner-up

Mixed doubles
Year	Tournament	Partner	Opponent	Score	Result
2004	Canterbury International	(Japan) Hiroshi Shimizu	(New Zealand) Craig Cooper (New Zealand) Lianne Shirley	15–11, 10–15, 4–15	(silver) Runner-up
2003	Cuba International	(Japan) Takanori Aoki	(Jamaica) Charles Pyne (Jamaica) Nigella Saunders	15–7, 15–11	(gold) Winner
2002	Macau Satellite	(Japan) Tōru Matsumoto	(Hong Kong) Li Wing Mui (Hong Kong) Wong Tsz Yin	11–1, 11–5	(gold) Winner
