= Tōru Matsumoto =

Japanese badminton player (born 1977)

Personal information
- Born: 14 July 1977 (age 48) Obata-cho, Mie Prefecture, Japan
- Height: 1.68 m (5 ft 6 in)

Sport
- Country: Japan
- Sport: Badminton
- Handedness: Right
- Event: Men's singles & doubles

Men's singles & doubles
- BWF profile

Tōru Matsumoto (Japanese: 松本徹; Matsumoto Tōru; born 14 July 1977) is a retired Japanese badminton player from NTT East Badminton Club. He studied in Hieizan High School graduated from and Waseda University. After playing 8 years in club, he served as a manager for 3 years before finally retiring in 2015.

== Achievements ==
=== IBF International ===
Men's singles

Year	Tournament	Opponent	Score	Result
2003	Southern Pan Am Classic	(Canada) Andrew Dabeka	14–17, 12–15	(silver) Runner-up
2003	São Paulo Cup	(Japan) Shōji Satō	13–15, 4–15	(silver) Runner-up
2003	Ballarat International	(Japan) Sho Sasaki	15–12, 17–16	(gold) Winner
2003	Carebaco International	(Japan) Yuichi Ikeda	15–9, 15–3	(gold) Winner
2002	Macau Satellite	(Japan) Hidetaka Yamada	15–8, 10–15, 17–14	(gold) Winner
2001	Smiling Fish International	(Malaysia) Jason Wong	1–15, 1–15	(silver) Runner-up

Men's doubles

Year	Tournament	Partner	Opponent	Score	Result
2005	Miami International	(Japan) Keishi Kawaguchi	(Denmark) Anders Kristiansen (Denmark) Simon Mollyhus	2–15, 15–9, 5–15	(silver) Runner-up
2005	Peru International	(Japan) Keishi Kawaguchi	(Spain) José Antonio Crespo (Spain) Nicolás Escartín	15–7, 15–3	(gold) Winner
2005	Portugal International	(Japan) Keishi Kawaguchi	(England) Anthony Clark (England) Simon Archer	15–17, 4–15	(silver) Runner-up
2004	Western Australia International	(Japan) Keishi Kawaguchi	(Japan) Naoki Kawamae (Japan) Yusuke Shinkai	8–15, 12–15	(silver) Runner-up
2004	Canterbury International	(Japan) Keishi Kawaguchi	(Japan) Naoki Kawamae (Japan) Yusuke Shinkai	11–15, 4–15	(silver) Runner-up
2003	Carebaco International	(Japan) Keishi Kawaguchi	(Germany) Björn Siegemund (Germany) Ingo Kindervater	15–10, 10–15, 15–17	(silver) Runner-up
2001	Auckland International	(Japan) Takanori Aoki	(New Zealand) Christopher Blair (New Zealand) Daniel Shirley	3–7, 3–7, 7–5, ?, ?	(gold) Winner

Mixed doubles

Year	Tournament	Partner	Opponent	Score	Result
2002	Macau Satellite	(Japan) Miyuki Tai	(Hong Kong) Li Wing Mui (Hong Kong) Wong Tsz Yin	11–1, 11–5	(gold) Winner
