= Badminton Association of Japan =

National governing body for badminton in Japan

- 日本バドミントン協会
- Abbreviation: BAJ
- Formation: 1946
- Type: National Sport Association
- Purpose: Governing body for badminton
- Headquarters: Tokyo, Japan
- Region served: Japan
- Honorary President: Princess Takamado
- President: Mitsuru Murai
- Affiliations: BAC, BWF
- Website: badminton.or.jp

Badminton Association of Japan (BAJ, 日本バドミントン協会; Nippon Badominton Kyōkai), formerly known as the Nippon Badminton Association, is the national governing body for the sport of badminton in Japan.

== History ==
Badminton competition in Japan began in 1919 through YMCAs in major cities in Japan. The Nippon Badminton Association was founded in 1946 and joined the International Badminton Federation in 1952.

On 22 June 2025, the association's Board of Councilors officially changed the organization's English name from the Nippon Badminton Association to the Badminton Association of Japan, adopting the new abbreviation BAJ.

== Presidents ==
The following individuals have served as president or managing director of the Badminton Association of Japan. The title of president changed to managing director on 1 April 1957, following the association's attainment of corporate status. Her Imperial Highness Princess Takamado serves as the Honorary President.

Presidency	President	Took office	Left office	Ref
1	Genzaburou Shirayama	1947	30 April 1948	
2	Fumio Yamada	1 May 1948	27 October 1956	
3	Hirotoshi Honda	28 October 1956	18 October 1981	
4	Yoshio Sakurauchi	1 November 1981	5 September 2003	
5	Tamisuke Watanuki	6 September 2003	9 June 2019	
6	Yoshio Sekine	9 June 2019	30 November 2022	
7	Shinichi Nakamura	30 November 2022	17 June 2023	
8	Mitsuru Murai	18 June 2023	Present	

== Controversies ==
=== Administrative mismanagement ===
==== 2016 Osaka International cancellation ====
The 2016 Osaka International tournament was canceled after the Nippon Badminton Association (NBA) missed the application deadline set by the Badminton World Federation (BWF). The BWF had changed this deadline from August to April in October 2014, a notification overlooked by an NBA staff member. Consequently, the NBA's application, submitted in August 2015—four months late—was rejected. NBA Executive Director Kinji Zeniya issued an apology and stated the NBA's intent to reapply for the following year.

==== 2022 Japan Open registration error ====
The mixed doubles pair Hiroki Midorikawa and Natsu Saito were unable to compete in the 2022 Japan Open after the Nippon Badminton Association (NBA) mistakenly registered Natsu Saito as her sister, Shiori Saito. This registration error was discovered after the entry deadline, precluding their participation. The NBA acknowledged responsibility and committed to strengthening entry check procedures for international tournaments to prevent future occurrences.

==== 2023 Canada Open entry permit issue ====
Women's singles player Aya Ohori missed the 2023 Canada Open, a key event for 2024 Paris Olympics qualification, due to an administrative error by the Nippon Badminton Association (NBA). The NBA admitted a "deficiency" in submitting Ohori's Electronic Travel Authorization (eTA) documents. NBA President Mitsuru Murai explained that the issue was discovered just one day before Ohori's scheduled travel, making it impossible to obtain the necessary permit in time. Ohori, who was the second-highest ranked Japanese player, faced potential impacts on her Olympic qualification.

==== 2024 Denmark Open registration error ====
Women's doubles pair Arisa Igarashi and Ayako Sakuramoto, were unable to participate in the 2024 Denmark Open due to a Nippon Badminton Association (NBA) registration error. Igarashi expressed frustration, stating she had "repeatedly asked to prevent this from happening again". The NBA publicly acknowledged the error, confirming the pair's absence from the official entry list and issuing an apology. The association also stated it was in discussions to send them to an alternative tournament.

==== 2024 Bendigo International registration error ====
On 30 September 2024, Kyodo News reported that three male players from the Tonami Transportation team—Shun Saito, Yoshifumi Fujisawa, and Shuntaro Mezaki—were prevented from competing in the Bendigo International due to Nippon Badminton Association (NBA) entry errors. The NBA became aware of the error after being notified by the Tonami team. During a press conference on 1 October 2024, NBA President Mitsuru Murai apologized for the repeated entry failures, acknowledging that staff had overlooked including players on the entry list. He described the organization's structure as "sloppy" and committed to implementing changes.

=== Financial misconduct and consequences ===
==== Embezzlement Scandal (2018-2022) ====
The Japanese Olympic Committee (JOC) initiated an investigation after discovering that a former Nippon Badminton Association (NBA) employee had embezzled approximately 6.8 million yen during the 2018 fiscal year. The JOC was concerned by the NBA's concealment of the embezzlement and its executives' use of personal funds to cover the losses. On 24 March 2022, NBA Executive Director Kinji Zeniya confirmed the embezzlement, totaling around 6.8 million yen from training camp fees and prize money, occurred over six months ending March 2019, with the funds used for personal purposes.

The NBA internally discussed the incident in November 2019, where board members and auditors loaned the embezzled amount to the former employee. Non-disclosure was attributed to concerns regarding the impact on athletes, the former employee's social standing, and human rights. For their oversight, the executive director and secretary general received pay reductions. Separately, the NBA misinterpreted a government grant for a 2019 Japan-Korea high school exchange program, leading to the receipt of approximately 230,000 yen in undeserved subsidies. The NBA became aware of both the embezzlement and the subsidy issue only after a JOC investigation request in October 2021.

==== Withholding of Prime Minister's Cup (2022) ====
The NBA's embezzlement scandal and its inadequate response led to the withholding of the Prime Minister's Cup and the Minister of Education, Culture, Sports, Science and Technology Cup at the 2022 All Japan Championships. Consequently, the tournament name was altered, and the Japan Sports Agency (JSA), Tokyo Metropolitan Government, and Tokyo Metropolitan Sports Association withdrew sponsorship. Although the NBA submitted its application for the awards late, the primary reason for denial was its mishandling of the scandals. The absence of these symbolic trophies, typically awarded to singles and doubles winners, caused disappointment among players, with Kento Momota stating, "It's sad". Public sentiment expressed sympathy for athletes unaffected by the scandal who did not receive the awards.

==== JOC Penalties (2023) ====
On 26 January 2023, the JOC penalized the Nippon Badminton Association (NBA) for its scandals, including the systematic concealment of embezzlement, by reducing its training grant for fiscal year 2022 by 20%. Additionally, the JOC cut the national budget for NBA training by 20% for fiscal year 2023. These actions stemmed from concerns about the NBA's delayed verification and announcement of facts, and its failure to improve governance. The JOC recommended seven immediate actions to enhance NBA governance, which included board composition review, accounting manual creation, and multi-official approval systems. The NBA was also required to submit progress reports every three months.

=== Financial Crisis ===
==== Discontinuation of Osaka International ====
On 27 October 2023, the Nippon Badminton Association (NBA) announced the discontinuation of the Osaka International tournament, effective 2024. This decision stemmed from a re-evaluation of the NBA's business structure and discussions with stakeholders. The tournament had received significantly more funding than other events. Following the NBA's proposal to align its funding with other tournaments, the Osaka Prefectural Badminton Association relinquished its hosting duties, citing difficulties in continuation. The Osaka International had been a crucial event for developing young talent and was described as a "stepping stone" for rising players.

==== Consecutive annual deficits (2022-2023) ====
On 19 February 2024, Nippon Badminton Association (NBA) President Mitsuru Murai announced a financial recovery plan, attributing the problems to a "lack of sensitivity". The NBA had incurred a 370 million yen deficit in fiscal year 2022, primarily due to inflated costs for international competitions. This was followed by a projected 300 million yen deficit for fiscal year 2023, exacerbated by reduced government subsidies (nearly halved due to the 2022 embezzlement scandal) and increased travel expenses for Olympic qualifiers. Murai stated, "The badminton world has no future if we continue to spend as we have been doing," and outlined a policy of drastic cost-cutting and revenue increase, which included reviewing expenses, encouraging remote work, and close financial monitoring. Post-Paris Olympics, the NBA plans to reduce national team travel and seek additional sponsors. While immediate support for the national team continues through the Paris Olympics, future participation in tournaments and training camps will be reduced. The NBA aims to prioritize developing young players for the 2028 Los Angeles Olympics. Murai acknowledged the severity of the financial situation but affirmed that the association would not abandon badminton, emphasizing a temporary reduction in activity for future growth.

== Tournaments ==
=== International ===
- Japan Open Super 750: an annual tournament that is part of the BWF World Tour.
- Japan Masters Super 500: Established in 2023, this tournament is part of the BWF World Tour.
- Osaka International: An annual tournament held in Osaka since 2007, it has been discontinued.
- Akita Masters: A Super 100 tournament that has been discontinued.

=== Domestic ===
- All Japan Badminton Championships
- All Japan Members Badminton Championships
- Japan Ranking Circuit Tournament
