= Seiko Yamada =

Japanese badminton player (born 1978)

Personal information
- Born: March 22, 1978 (age 48) Toyama, Japan
- Height: 1.68 m (5 ft 6 in)
- Weight: 55 kg (121 lb)

Sport
- Country: Japan
- Sport: Badminton
- Handedness: Right
- Event: Women's doubles

Women's doubles
- BWF profile
Medal record
Women's badminton
Representing Japan
World Championships
| Bronze medal – third place | 2003 Birmingham | Women's doubles |

Seiko Yamada (山田 靑子, Yamada Seiko; born 22 March 1978; in Toyama) is a Japanese badminton player. Together with Shizuka Yamamoto, she won the women's doubles national champion in 2000 and 2003. Yamada competed in badminton at the 2004 Summer Olympics in women's doubles with partner Shizuka Yamamoto. They were defeated by Chin Eei Hui and Wong Pei Tty of Malaysia in the round of 32. She is currently ranked #7 in Japan.

== Achievements ==
=== IBF World Championships ===
Women's doubles
| Year | Venue | Partner | Opponent | Score | Result |
|---|---|---|---|---|---|
| 2003 | National Indoor Arena; Birmingham, England | (Japan) Shizuka Yamamoto | (China) Wei Yili (China) Zhao Tingting | 9–15, 11–15 | Bronze |

=== BWF International Challenge/Series (2 titles, 4 runners-up) ===
Women's doubles
| Year | Tournament | Partner | Opponent | Score | Result | Ref. |
|---|---|---|---|---|---|---|
| 2012 | Iran Fajr International | (Japan) Ayumi Tasaki | (Japan) Rie Eto (Japan) Yu Wakita | 15–21, 21–23 | (silver) Runner-up | |
| 2009 | Lao International | (Japan) Yuka Hayashi | (Japan) Aki Akao (Japan) Yasuyo Imabeppu | 21–15, 11–21, 14–21 | (silver) Runner-up | |
| 2005 | French Open | (Japan) Shizuka Matsuo | (France) Elodie Eymard (France) Weny Rahmawati | 12–15, 17–14, 6–15 | (silver) Runner-up | |
| 2003 | Western Australia International | (Japan) Shizuka Yamamoto | (New Zealand) Rebecca Gordon (New Zealand) Sara Runesten-Petersen | 15–3, 15–5 | (gold) Winner | |
| 2003 | Waikato International | (Japan) Shizuka Yamamoto | (Japan) Ai Hirayama (Japan) Akiko Nakashima | 15–1, 17–16 | (gold) Winner | |
| 2003 | Mauritius International | (Japan) Shizuka Yamamoto | (Germany) Nicole Grether (Germany) Juliane Schenk | 9–15, 4–15 | (silver) Runner-up | |

BWF International Challenge tournament
BWF International Series tournament
