= Shizuka Yamamoto =

Japanese badminton player

Personal information
- Born: December 5, 1975 (age 50) Fukuoka, Japan
- Height: 1.64 m (5 ft 5 in)
- Weight: 58 kg (128 lb)

Sport
- Country: Japan
- Sport: Badminton
- Event: Women's doubles

Women's doubles
- BWF profile
Medal record
Women's badminton
Representing Japan
World Championships
Bronze medal – third place	2003 Birmingham	Women's doubles

Shizuka Yamamoto (山本静香, Yamamoto Shizuka; born December 5, 1975) is a badminton player from Japan.

She competed in badminton at the 2004 Summer Olympics in women's doubles with partner Seiko Yamada. They were defeated by Chin Eei Hui and Wong Pei Tty of Malaysia in the round of 32.

Yamamoto also competed in mixed doubles with partner Tadashi Ohtsuka. They were defeated in the round of 32 by Robert Blair and Natalie Munt of Great Britain.
