= Chikako Nakayama =

Japanese badminton player (born 1975)

Personal information
- Born: 30 August 1975 (age 51) Hokkaido Prefecture, Japan
- Height: 1.57 m (5 ft 2 in)
- Weight: 52 kg (115 lb)

Sport
- Country: Japan
- Sport: Badminton
- Event: Women's doubles
Medal record
Women's badminton
Representing Japan
Uber Cup
Bronze medal – third place	2004 Jakarta	Women's team
East Asian Games
Bronze medal – third place	1997 Busan	Women's doubles
Bronze medal – third place	1997 Busan	Women's team

Chikako Nakayama (中山 智香子, Nakayama Chikako; born August 30, 1975, in Hokkaidō, Japan) is a female badminton player from Japan.

Nakayama competed in badminton at the 2004 Summer Olympics in women's doubles with partner Keiko Yoshimoti. They had a bye in the first round and were defeated by Saralee Thungthongkam and Sathinee Chankrachangwong of Thailand in the round of 16.

== Achievements ==
=== IBF International Series ===
Women's doubles
Year	Tournament	Partner	Opponent	Score	Result	Ref.
1999	Spanish International	(Japan) Takae Masumo	(England) Joanne Davies (England) Gail Emms	15–12, 15–11	(gold) Winner	
1999	Scottish Open	(Japan) Takae Masumo	(Russia) Irina Ruslyakova (Russia) Marina Yakusheva	15–10, 15–5	(gold) Winner	
2003	South Africa International	(Japan) Keiko Yoshitomi	(Japan) Yoshiko Iwata (Japan) Miyuki Tai	4–15, 15–4, 15–5	(gold) Winner	

Mixed doubles
Year	Tournament	Partner	Opponent	Score	Result	Ref.
2000	Cuba International	(Japan) Norio Imai	(Canada) Mike Beres (Canada) Kara Solmundson	15–4, 15–13	(gold) Winner	
