= Keiko Yoshitomi =

Japanese badminton player

Keiko Yoshitomi (吉冨 桂子, Yoshitomi Keiko; born April 8, 1975 in Fukuoka, Japan) is a female badminton player from Japan.

Yoshimoti competed in badminton at the 2004 Summer Olympics in women's doubles with partner Chikako Nakayama. They had a bye in the first round and were defeated by Saralee Thungthongkam and Sathinee Chankrachangwong of Thailand in the round of 16.
