= 2009 BWF Grand Prix Gold and Grand Prix =

The 2009 BWF Grand Prix Gold and Grand Prix was the third season of BWF Grand Prix Gold and Grand Prix in badminton.

== Schedule ==
Below is the schedule released by Badminton World Federation:

Tour	Official title	Venue	City	Date	
Tour	Official title	Venue	City	Start	Finish
1	(Germany) German Open Grand Prix	RWE-Sporthalle	Mülheim	February 24	March 1
2	India Open Grand Prix Gold	Gachibowli Indoor Stadium	Hyderabad	March 24	March 29
3	Malaysia Open Grand Prix Gold	Stadium Bandaraya Johor Bahru	Johor Bahru	June 23	June 28
4	Philippines Open Grand Prix Gold	PhilSports Complex	Manila	June 30	July 5
5	(United States) U.S. Open Grand Prix	Orange County Badminton Club	Orange	July 7	July 12
6	Thailand Open Grand Prix Gold	Nimibutr Stadium	Bangkok	July 21	July 26
7	(Australia) Australian Open Grand Prix	Melbourne Sports and Aquatic Centre	Melbourne	July 22	July 26
8	New Zealand Open Grand Prix	North Shore Events Centre	Auckland	July 28	August 1
9	Macau Open Grand Prix Gold	Tap Seac Multisports Pavilion	Macau	August 18	August 23
10	Chinese Taipei Open Grand Prix Gold	Taipei County Shinjuang Stadium	Taipei	August 25	August 30
11	Russia Open Grand Prix	Sports Hall Olympic	Vladivostok	September 23	September 27
12	(Germany) Bitburger Open Grand Prix	Saarlandhalle	Saarbrücken	September 29	October 4
13	Vietnam Open Grand Prix	Phan Dinh Phung Stadium	Ho Chi Minh City	October 6	October 11
14	(Netherlands) Dutch Open Grand Prix	Topsportcentrum	Almere	October 13	October 18
15	India Open Grand Prix	Babu Banarasi Das Indoor Stadium	Lucknow	December 15	December 20

Grand Prix Gold

== Results ==
=== Winners ===
Tour	Men's singles	Women's singles	Men's doubles	Women's doubles	Mixed doubles
(Germany) German Open Grand Prix	(China) Bao Chunlai	(China) Wang Yihan	(South Korea) Lee Yong-dae / Shin Baek-cheol	(China) Cheng Shu / Zhao Yunlei	(China) Xu Chen / Zhao Yunlei
India Open Grand Prix Gold	(Indonesia) Taufik Hidayat	(France) Pi Hongyan	(Malaysia) Choong Tan Fook / Lee Wan Wah	(China) Ma Jin / Wang Xiaoli	(Indonesia) Flandy Limpele / Vita Marissa
Malaysia Open Grand Prix Gold	(Malaysia) Lee Chong Wei	(China) Wang Shixian	(Malaysia) Koo Kien Keat / Tan Boon Heong	(China) Ma Jin / Wang Xiaoli	(China) Zheng Bo / Ma Jin
Philippines Open Grand Prix Gold	(China) Chen Long	(China) Wang Xin	(Indonesia) Mohammad Ahsan / Bona Septano	(China) Gao Ling / Wei Yili	(China) Zhang Nan / Lu Lu
(United States) U.S. Open Grand Prix	(Indonesia) Taufik Hidayat	(Canada) Anna Rice	(United States) Howard Bach / Tony Gunawan	(Canada) Huang Ruilin / Jiang Xuelian	(United States) Howard Bach / Eva Lee
Thailand Open Grand Prix Gold	(Vietnam) Nguyen Tien Minh	(China) Liu Jian	(Malaysia) Chan Peng Soon / Lim Khim Wah	(China) Yang Wei / Zhang Jiewen	(Thailand) Songphon Anugritayawon / Kunchala Voravichitchaikul
(Australia) Australian Open Grand Prix	(Indonesia) Dionysius Hayom Rumbaka	(Indonesia) Maria Febe Kusumastuti	(Malaysia) Gan Teik Chai / Tan Bin Shen	(Australia) Huang Chia-chi / Tang He Tian	(Hong Kong) Yohan Hadikusumo Wiratama / Chau Hoi Wah
New Zealand Open Grand Prix	(Hong Kong) Chan Yan Kit	(Japan) Sayaka Sato	(India) Rupesh Kumar / Sanave Thomas	(Indonesia) Annisa Wahyuni / Anneke Feinya Agustin	(Indonesia) Fran Kurniawan / Pia Zebadiah Bernadet
Macau Open Grand Prix Gold	(Malaysia) Lee Chong Wei	(China) Wang Yihan	(Malaysia) Koo Kien Keat / Tan Boon Heong	(China) Du Jing / Yu Yang	(China) He Hanbin / Yu Yang
Chinese Taipei Open Grand Prix Gold	(Vietnam) Nguyen Tien Minh	(Chinese Taipei) Cheng Shao-chieh	(Chinese Taipei) Chen Hung-Ling / Lin Yu-Lang	(China) Yang Wei / Zhang Jiewen	(India) Valiyaveetil Diju / Jwala Gutta
Russia Open Grand Prix	(Russia) Vladimir Malkov	(Russia) Ella Diehl	(Russia) Vladimir Ivanov / Ivan Sozonov	(Russia) Valeria Sorokina / Nina Vislova	(Russia) Vitalij Durkin / Nina Vislova
(Germany) Bitburger Open Grand Prix	(Denmark) Jan Ø. Jørgensen	(Germany) Juliane Schenk	(India) Rupesh Kumar / Sanave Thomas	(Denmark) Helle Nielsen / Marie Roepke	(Denmark) Mikkel Delbo Larsen / Mie Schjoett-Kristensen
Vietnam Open Grand Prix	(Vietnam) Nguyen Tien Minh	(Indonesia) Fransisca Ratnasari	(Indonesia) Luluk Hadiyanto / Joko Riyadi	(Indonesia) Anneke Feinya Agustin / Annisa Wahyuni	(Indonesia) Flandy Limpele / (Chinese Taipei) Cheng Wen-hsing
(Netherlands) Dutch Open Grand Prix	(India) Chetan Anand	(Netherlands) Yao Jie	(Germany) Kristof Hopp / Johannes Schottler	(Russia) Valeria Sorokina / Nina Vislova	(Russia) Alexander Nikolaenko / Valeria Sorokina
India Open Grand Prix	(India) Chetan Anand	(India) Saina Nehwal	(Indonesia) Fauzi Adnan / Trikusuma Wardhana	(Japan) Misaki Matsutomo / Ayaka Takahashi	(India) Arun Vishnu / Aparna Balan

== Grand Prix Gold ==
India Open (not to be confused with 2009 India Grand Prix which was held on 15 to 20 December 2009.)

- March 24–29, Gachibowli Indoor Stadium, Hyderabad, India.

Category	Winners	Runners-up	Score
Men's singles	(Indonesia) Taufik Hidayat	(Malaysia) Muhammad Hafiz Hashim	21–18, 21–19
Women's singles	(France) Pi Hongyan	(Malaysia) Julia Wong Pei Xian	17–21, 21–15, 21–14
Men's doubles	(Malaysia) Choong Tan Fook / Lee Wan Wah	(Singapore) Hendri Kurniawan Saputra / Hendra Wijaya	21–9, 21–11
Women's doubles	(China) Ma Jin / Wang Xiaoli	(Indonesia) Vita Marissa / Nadya Melati	21–14, 21–13
Mixed doubles	(Indonesia) Flandy Limpele / Vita Marissa	(India) Diju Valiyaveetil / Jwala Gutta	21–14, 21–17

Malaysia Open

- June 23–28, Stadium Bandaraya Johor Bahru, Johor Bahru, Malaysia.

Category	Winners	Runners-up	Score
Men's singles	(Malaysia) Lee Chong Wei	(China) Chen Long	21–16, 21–9
Women's singles	(China) Wang Shixian	(China) Wang Xin	21–16, 18–21, 21–10
Men's doubles	(Malaysia) Koo Kien Keat / Tan Boon Heong	(Malaysia) Gan Teik Chai / Tan Bin Shen	21–11, 21–13
Women's doubles	(China) Ma Jin / Wang Xiaoli	(Malaysia) Wong Pei Tty / Chin Eei Hui	21–9, 21–11
Mixed doubles	(China) Zheng Bo / Ma Jin	(China) Xu Chen / Zhao Yunlei	5–5, retired

Philippines Open

- June 30–July 5, PhilSports Complex, Manila, Philippines.

Category	Winners	Runners-up	Score
Men's singles	(China) Chen Long	(Hong Kong) Hu Yun	21–13, 21–6
Women's singles	(China) Wang Xin	(Hong Kong) Zhou Mi	21–10, 12–21, 23–21
Men's doubles	(Indonesia) Mohammad Ahsan / Bona Septano	(Indonesia) Alvent Yulianto / Hendra Aprida Gunawan	10–21, 21–14, 21–17
Women's doubles	(China) Gao Ling / Wei Yili	(Indonesia) Shendy Puspa Irawati / Meiliana Jauhari	21–11, 21–11
Mixed doubles	(China) Zhang Nan / Lu Lu	(China) Chen Zhiben / Zhang Jinkang	22–20, 21–19

Thailand Open

- July 21–26, Nimibutr National Stadium, Bangkok, Thailand.

Category	Winners	Runners-up	Score
Men's singles	(Vietnam) Nguyen Tien Minh	(Thailand) Boonsak Ponsana	21–16, 21–13
Women's singles	(China) Liu Jian	(China) Wang Rong	21–16, 21–18
Men's doubles	(Malaysia) Chan Peng Soon / Lim Khim Wah	(Malaysia) Choong Tan Fook / Lee Wan Wah	20–22, 21–14, 21–11
Women's doubles	(China) Yang Wei / Zhang Jiewen	(China) Gao Ling / Wei Yili	22–24, 21–17, 21–15
Mixed doubles	(Thailand) Songphon Anugritayawon / Kunchala Voravichitchaikul	(Thailand) Sudket Prapakamol / Saralee Thungthongkam	11–21, 21–17, 21–14

Macau Open

- August 18–23, Tap Seac Multi-sports Pavilion, Macau.

Category	Winners	Runners-up	Score
Men's singles	(Malaysia) Lee Chong Wei	(Malaysia) Wong Choong Hann	21–15, 21–19
Women's singles	(China) Wang Yihan	(China) Jiang Yanjiao	16–21, 22–20, 21–12
Men's doubles	(Malaysia) Koo Kien Keat / Tan Boon Heong	(Malaysia) Choong Tan Fook / Lee Wan Wah	21–14, 17–21, 21–12
Women's doubles	(China) Du Jing / Yu Yang	(China) Yang Wei / Zhang Jiewen	21–16, 21–11
Mixed doubles	(China) He Hanbin / Yu Yang	(Indonesia) Hendra Aprida Gunawan / Vita Marissa	21–14, 21–9

Chinese Taipei Open

- August 25–August 30, Taipei County Shinjuang Stadium, Taipei, Republic of China (Taiwan).

Category	Winners	Runners-up	Score
Men's singles	(Vietnam) Nguyen Tien Minh	(Malaysia) Wong Choong Hann	21–11, 21–14
Women's singles	(Chinese Taipei) Cheng Shao-chieh	(South Korea) Bae Seung-Hee	17–21, 21–12, 21–15
Men's doubles	(Chinese Taipei) Chen Hung-Ling / Lin Yu-Lang	(Hong Kong) Yohan Hadikusumo Wiratama / Wong Wai Hong	14–21, 21–12, 21–19
Women's doubles	(China) Yang Wei / Zhang Jiewen	(Indonesia) Vita Marissa / (United States) Mona Santoso	21–14, 21–9
Mixed doubles	(India) Valiyaveetil Diju / Jwala Gutta	(Indonesia) Hendra Aprida Gunawan / Vita Marissa	23–21, 21–18

== Grand Prix ==
German Open

- February 24–March 1, RWE Rhein-Ruhr Sporthalle, Mülheim, Germany.

Category	Winners	Runners-up	Score
Men's singles	(China) Bao Chunlai	(China) Gong Weijie	21–18, 21–14
Women's singles	(China) Wang Yihan	(China) Zhu Lin	20–22, 21–13, 21–11
Men's doubles	(South Korea) Lee Yong-dae / Shin Baek-cheol	(Japan) Kenichi Hayakawa / Kenta Kazuno	21–13, 21–16
Women's doubles	(China) Cheng Shu / Zhao Yunlei	(China) Pan Pan / Tian Qing	18–21, 21–13, 21–16
Mixed doubles	(China) Xu Chen / Zhao Yunlei	(China) Zheng Bo / Ma Jin	21–18, 23–21

U.S. Open

- July 7–12, Orange County Badminton Club, Los Angeles, United States.

Category	Winners	Runners-up	Category
Men's singles	(Indonesia) Taufik Hidayat	(Chinese Taipei) Hsueh Hsuan-yi	21–15, 21–16
Women's singles	(Canada) Anna Rice	(United States) Mona Santoso	21–17, 21–9
Men's doubles	(United States) Howard Bach / Tony Gunawan	(Austria) Jürgen Koch / Peter Zauner	21–12, 21–9
Women's doubles	(Canada) Huang Ruilin / Jiang Xuelian	(United States) Chen Ying / Peng Yun	14–21, 21–15, 21–11
Mixed doubles	(United States) Howard Bach / Eva Lee	(Canada) Alvin Lau / Jiang Xuelian	21–13, 21–12

Australian Open

- July 22–26, Melbourne Sports and Aquatic Centre, Melbourne, Australia.

Category	Winners	Runners-up	Score
Men's singles	(Indonesia) Dionysius Hayom Rumbaka	(Indonesia) Alamsyah Yunus	21–17, 21–18
Women's singles	(Indonesia) Maria Febe Kusumastuti	(Hong Kong) Yip Pui Yin	21–18, 21–19
Men's doubles	(Malaysia) Gan Teik Chai / Tan Bin Shen	(India) Rupesh Kumar / Sanave Thomas	21–13, 21–11
Women's doubles	(Australia) Huang Chia-chi / Tang He Tian	(India) Aparna Balan / Shruti Kurian	21–13, 21–9
Mixed doubles	(Hong Kong) Yohan Hadikusumo Wiratama / Chau Hoi Wah	(New Zealand) Henry Tam / Donna Haliday	21–11, 21–5

New Zealand Open

- July 28–August 1, North Shore Events Centre, Auckland, New Zealand.

Category	Winners	Runners-up	Score
Men's singles	(Hong Kong) Chan Yan Kit	(Hong Kong) Wong Wing Ki	21–9, 21–9
Women's singles	(Japan) Sayaka Sato	(Indonesia) Maria Febe Kusumastuti	21–10, 21–16
Men's doubles	(India) Rupesh Kumar / Sanave Thomas	(Japan) Hirokatsu Hashimoto / Noriyasu Hirata	21–16, 15–21, 21–13
Women's doubles	(Indonesia) Annisa Wahyuni / Anneke Feinya Agustin	(Hong Kong) Chan Tsz Ka / Tse Ying Suet	21–19, 21–17
Mixed doubles	(Indonesia) Fran Kurniawan / Pia Zebadiah Bernadet	(Hong Kong) Yohan Hadikusumo Wiratama / Chau Hoi Wah	21–13, 21–19

Russian Open

- September 22–27, Sport Hall Olympic, Vladivostok, Russia.

Category	Winners	Runners-up	Score
Men's singles	(Russia) Vladimir Malkov	(France) Brice Leverdez	21–17, 11–21, 21–8
Women's singles	(Russia) Ella Diehl	(Russia) Tatjana Bibik	21–17, 16–21, 21–11
Men's doubles	(Russia) Vladimir Ivanov / Ivan Sozonov	(Russia) Alexandr Nikolaenko / Vitalij Durkin	21–19, 21–19
Women's doubles	(Russia) Valeria Sorokina / Nina Vislova	(Russia) Tatjana Bibik / Olga Golovanova	21–8, 22–20
Mixed doubles	(Russia) Vitalij Durkin / Nina Vislova	(Russia) Alexandr Nikolaenko / Valeria Sorokina	21–16, 21–16

Bitburger Open

- September 29–October 4, Saarlandhalle, Saarbrücken, Germany.

Category	Winners	Runners-up	Score
Men's singles	(Denmark) Jan Ø. Jørgensen	(Netherlands) Eric Pang	12–21, 21–13, 21–15
Women's singles	(Germany) Juliane Schenk	(Japan) Yu Hirayama	21–18, 21–10
Men's doubles	(India) Rupesh Kumar / Sanave Thomas	(England) Chris Adcock / Andrew Ellis	17–21, 22–20, 24–22
Women's doubles	(Denmark) Helle Nielsen / Marie Roepke	(Denmark) Line Damkjaer Kruse / Mie Schjoett-Kristensen	18–21, 21–19, 21–19
Mixed doubles	(Denmark) Mikkel Delbo Larsen / Mie Schjoett-Kristensen	(Netherlands) Ruud Bosch / Paulien van Dooremalen	21–17, 21–16

Vietnam Open

- October 6–11, Phan Dinh Phung Stadium, Ho Chi Minh City, Vietnam.

Category	Winners	Runners-up	Score
Men's singles	(Vietnam) Nguyen Tien Minh	(Malaysia) Chong Wei Feng	21–7, 19–21, 21–14
Women's singles	(Indonesia) Fransisca Ratnasari	(Chinese Taipei) Tai Tzu-ying	21–19, 15–21, 21–13
Men's doubles	(Indonesia) Luluk Hadiyanto / Joko Riyadi	(Malaysia) Hoon Thien How / Ong Soon Hock	21–19, 22–20
Women's doubles	(Indonesia) Anneke Feinya Agustin / Annisa Wahyuni	(Thailand) Savitree Amitrapai / Vacharaporn Munkit	21–14, 21–13
Mixed doubles	(Indonesia) Flandy Limpele / (Chinese Taipei) Cheng Wen-hsing	(Malaysia) Chan Peng Soon / Goh Liu Ying	25–23, 21–19

Dutch Open

- October 13–18, Topsportcentrum, Almere, Netherlands.

Category	Winners	Runners-up	Score
Men's singles	(India) Chetan Anand	(Netherlands) Eric Pang	21–12, 21–15
Women's singles	(Netherlands) Yao Jie	(Netherlands) Judith Meulendijks	21–11, 21–12
Men's doubles	(Germany) Kristof Hopp / Johannes Schottler	(Germany) Michael Fuchs / Ingo Kindervater	21–15, 21–16
Women's doubles	(Russia) Valeria Sorokina / Nina Vislova	(Germany) Sandra Marinello / Birgit Overzier	21–13, 21–17
Mixed doubles	(Russia) Alexander Nikolaenko / Valeria Sorokina	(Russia) Vitalij Durkin / Nina Vislova	13–21, 21–16, 21–12

India Grand Prix

- December 15–20, Gomti Nagar, Lucknow, India.

Category	Winners	Runners-up	Score
Men's singles	(India) Chetan Anand	(Indonesia) Dionysius Hayom Rumbaka	21–17, 19–21, 21–16
Women's singles	(India) Saina Nehwal	(India) Aditi Mutatkar	21–17, 21–13
Men's doubles	(Indonesia) Fauzi Adnan / Trikusuma Wardhana	(India) Akshay Dewalkar / Jishnu Sanyal	27–25, 23–25, 21–15
Women's doubles	(Japan) Misaki Matsutomo / Ayaka Takahashi	(Indonesia) Nadya Melati / Devi Tika Permatasari	21–14, 15–21, 21–15
Mixed doubles	(India) Arun Vishnu / Aparna Balan	(India) Tarun Kona / Shruti Kurien-Kanetkar	21–14, 17–21, 21–19
