= 2013 Singapore Super Series =

Tournament details
- Dates: 18 June 2013– 23 June 2013
- Edition: 64th
- Level: Super Series
- Total prize money: US$200,000
- Venue: Singapore Indoor Stadium
- Location: Kallang, Singapore

Champions
- Men's singles: (Indonesia) Tommy Sugiarto
- Women's singles: (China) Wang Yihan
- Men's doubles: (Indonesia) Mohammad Ahsan (Indonesia) Hendra Setiawan
- Women's doubles: (China) Tian Qing (China) Zhao Yunlei
- Mixed doubles: (Indonesia) Tontowi Ahmad (Indonesia) Liliyana Natsir

The 2013 Singapore Super Series was the sixth super series tournament of the 2013 BWF Super Series. The tournament was held in Singapore from 18–23 June 2013 and had a total purse of $200,000.

== Men's singles ==
=== Seeds ===
1. (China) Du Pengyu
2. (Hong Kong) Hu Yun
3. (Indonesia) Sony Dwi Kuncoro
4. (Japan) Kenichi Tago
5. (Thailand) Boonsak Ponsana
6. (Vietnam) Nguyễn Tiến Minh
7. (India) Parupalli Kashyap
8. (China) Wang Zhengming

=== Top half ===
First Round
1	(China) Du PY	21	21
(India) A Pawar	16	13
(China) Chen YK	21	20	17
(Germany) M Zwiebler	19	22	21
6	(Vietnam) Nguyễn T M	19	21	21
PFQ	(India) S Kidambi	21	16	12
PFQ	(Thailand) S Avihingsanon	21	16	18
(Thailand) T Saensomboonsuk	19	21	21
4	(Japan) K Tago	21	18	21
(India) A Jayaram	19	21	17
(Malaysia) M A A Latif	21	9	12
(England) R Ouseph	17	21	21
8	(China) Wang ZM	21	21
(Malaysia) Liew DR	15	18
Q1	(South Korea) Lee D-k	20	16
(Indonesia) T Sugiarto	22	21

Second Round
1	(China) Du PY	18	21	19
(Germany) M Zwiebler	21	12	21
6	(Vietnam) Nguyễn T M	17	21	21
(Thailand) T Saensomboonsuk	21	5	13
4	(Japan) K Tago	12	18
(England) R Ouseph	21	21
8	(China) Wang ZM	16	20
(Indonesia) T Sugiarto	21	22

Quarterfinals
(Germany) M Zwiebler	21	8^{r}
6	(Vietnam) Nguyễn T M	23	11
(England) R Ouseph	19	18
(Indonesia) T Sugiarto	21	21

Semifinals
6	(Vietnam) Nguyễn T M	22	19	15
(Indonesia) T Sugiarto	20	21	21

=== Bottom half ===
First Round
(Japan) K Sakai	21	15	21
PFQ	(Finland) V Lång	18	21	18
(Japan) T Ueda	18	22	21
7	(India) P Kashyap	21	20	15
(Japan) S Sasaki	14	15
Q4	(Hong Kong) Ng K L	21	21
(Malaysia) Tan C S	15	9
PFQ	(Japan) K Momota	21	21
(India) S Varma	17	17
(Hong Kong) Wong W K	21	21
Q3	(Malaysia) Z Zulkiffli	12	12
5	(Thailand) B Ponsana	21	21
(Malaysia) Chong W F	15	21	21
(India) G Dutt	21	18	9
Q2	(India) B Sai Praneeth	21	21
2	(Hong Kong) Hu Y	9	10

Second Round
(Japan) K Sakai	13	14
(Japan) T Ueda	21	21
Q4	(Hong Kong) Ng K L	17	12
PFQ	(Japan) K Momota	21	21
(Hong Kong) Wong W K	15	13
5	(Thailand) B Ponsana	21	21
(Malaysia) Chong W F	21	17	21
Q2	(India) B Sai Praneeth	11	21	16

Quarterfinals
(Japan) T Ueda	21	21
PFQ	(Japan) K Momota	14	19
5	(Thailand) B Ponsana	21	21
(Malaysia) Chong W F	10	19

Semifinals
(Japan) T Ueda	8	15
5	(Thailand) B Ponsana	21	21

=== Finals ===
Semifinals
6	(Vietnam) Nguyễn Tiến Minh	22	19	15
(Indonesia) Tommy Sugiarto	20	21	21
(Japan) Takuma Ueda	8	15
5	(Thailand) Boonsak Ponsana	21	21

Final
(Indonesia) Tommy Sugiarto	20	21	21
5	(Thailand) Boonsak Ponsana	22	5	17

== Women's singles ==
=== Seeds ===
1. (China) Li Xuerui
2. (India) Saina Nehwal
3. (Germany) Juliane Schenk
4. (China) Wang Yihan
5. (Thailand) Ratchanok Intanon
6. (South Korea) Sung Ji-hyun
7. (China) Wang Shixian
8. (Japan) Minatsu Mitani

=== Top half ===
First Round
1	(China) Li XR	21	21
(France) S V Waran	10	14
(Thailand) N Jindapol	19	14
(Indonesia) B Manuputty	21	21
6	(South Korea) Sung J-h	17	21	21
PFQ	(Malaysia) S Cheah	21	9	17
(Hong Kong) Yip P Y	9	21	10
(Thailand) S Taerattanachai	21	18	21
3	(Germany) J Schenk	16	21	21
(Hong Kong) Chan T K	21	6	13
Q2	(China) Yu S	21	21
(Japan) Y Hashimoto	9	5
8	(Japan) M Mitani	17	21	21
(Indonesia) A Firdasari	21	15	18
(Chinese Taipei) Tai T-y	21	7	21
(Indonesia) A Yuswandari	11	21	8

Second Round
1	(China) Li XR	21	18	21
(Indonesia) B Manuputty	19	21	14
6	(South Korea) Sung J-h	19	16
(Thailand) S Taerattanachai	21	21
3	(Germany) J Schenk	19	15
Q2	(China) Yu S	21	21
8	(Japan) M Mitani	20	12
(Chinese Taipei) Tai T-y	22	21

Quarterfinals
1	(China) Li XR	21	21
(Thailand) S Taerattanachai	11	19
Q2	(China) Yu S	21	21
(Chinese Taipei) Tai T-y	17	11

Semifinals
1	(China) Li XR	21	21
Q2	(China) Yu S	13	11

=== Bottom half ===
First Round
Q4	(India) A Pantawane	18	18
(Bulgaria) P Nedelcheva	21	21
(South Korea) Bae Y-j	19	19
7	(China) Wang SX	21	21
(Japan) S Takahashi	12	18
(Spain) C Marín	21	21
(Thailand) B Ongbamrungphan	21	12	19
4	(China) Wang YH	16	21	21
Q1	(India) P. C. Thulasi	23	16	16
(Indonesia) L Fanetri	21	21	21
Q3	(Singapore) Xing AY	19	16
PFQ	(Japan) K Imabeppu	21	21
(Thailand) P Buranaprasertsuk	17	7
(Japan) E Hirose	21	21
(Singapore) Gu J	14	21
2	(India) S Nehwal	21	23

Second Round
(Bulgaria) P Nedelcheva	18	15
7	(China) Wang SX	21	21
(Spain) C Marín	18	21	17
4	(China) Wang YH	21	11	21
(Indonesia) L Fanetri	21	22
PFQ	(Japan) K Imabeppu	15	20
(Japan) E Hirose	21	16	9
2	(India) S Nehwal	16	21	21

Quarterfinals
7	(China) Wang SX	15	11
4	(China) Wang YH	21	21
(Indonesia) L Fanetri	17	21	21
2	(India) S Nehwal	21	13	13

Semifinals
4	(China) Wang YH	20	21	21
(Indonesia) L Fanetri	22	17	18

=== Finals ===
Semifinals
1	(China) Li Xuerui	21	21
Q2	(China) Yu Sun	13	11
4	(China) Wang Yihan	20	21	21
(Indonesia) Lindaweni Fanetri	22	17	18

Final
1	(China) Li Xuerui	18	12
4	(China) Wang Yihan	21	21

== Men's doubles ==
=== Seeds ===
1. (South Korea) Ko Sung-hyun / Lee Yong-dae
2. (Japan) Hiroyuki Endo / Kenichi Hayakawa
3. (South Korea) Kim Gi-jung / Kim Sa-rang
4. (China) Liu Xiaolong / Qiu Zihan
5. (China) Cai Yun / Fu Haifeng
6. (South Korea) Shin Baek-cheol / Yoo Yeon-seong
7. (Indonesia) Angga Pratama / Rian Agung Saputro
8. (Malaysia) Goh V Shem / Lim Khim Wah

=== Top half ===
First Round
1	(South Korea) Ko S-h (South Korea) Lee Y-d	21	21
(China) Chai B (China) Hong W	13	17
(Malaysia) M Z A Latif (Malaysia) M F M Tazari	19	15
Q1	(Malaysia) Ong J G (Malaysia) Teo K S	21	21
7	(Indonesia) A Pratama (Indonesia) R A Saputro	14	21	19
(Thailand) M Jongjit (Thailand) N Phuangphuapet	21	14	21
(England) C Langridge (England) P Mills	14	15
Q3	(Hong Kong) Chan Y L (Hong Kong) Lee C H	21	21
PFQ	(Thailand) S Prapakamol (Singapore) C Triyachart	21	21	15
(Indonesia) Y S Dasuki (Indonesia) H A Gunawan	23	16	21
Q4	(Hong Kong) Chan T K (Hong Kong) Lo L K	15	13
(Japan) H Saeki (Japan) R Taohata	21	21
6	(South Korea) Shin B-c (South Korea) Yoo Y-s	17	21	21
(Indonesia) R K Suwardi (Indonesia) M Ulinnuha	21	12	7
(India) P J Chopra (India) A Dewalker	27	21
(England) M Ellis (Scotland) P van Rietvelde	25	17

Second Round
1	(South Korea) Ko S-h (South Korea) Lee Y-d	21	21
Q1	(Malaysia) Ong J G (Malaysia) Teo K S	11	12
(Thailand) M Jongjit (Thailand) N Phuangphuapet	21	21
Q3	(Hong Kong) Chan Y L (Hong Kong) Lee C H	12	17
(Indonesia) Y S Dasuki (Indonesia) H A Gunawan	19	18
(Japan) H Saeki (Japan) R Taohata	21	21
6	(South Korea) Shin B-c (South Korea) Yoo Y-s	21	21
(India) P Chopra (India) A Dewalker	14	19

Quarterfinals
1	(South Korea) Ko S-h (South Korea) Lee Y-d	21	21
(Thailand) M Jongjit (Thailand) N Phuangphuapet	9	16
(Japan) H Saeki (Japan) R Taohata	14	12
6	(South Korea) Shin B-c (South Korea) Yoo Y-s	21	21

Semifinals
1	(South Korea) Ko S-h (South Korea) Lee Y-d	21	21
6	(South Korea) Shin B-c (South Korea) Yoo Y-s	15	19

=== Bottom half ===
First Round
(South Korea) Kang J-w (South Korea) Lee S-j	23	21
(India) T Kona (India) A Vishnu	21	18
Q2	(Indonesia) A Adistia (Indonesia) M F Gideon	23	18
5	(China) Cai Y (China) Fu HF	25	21
(England) C Adcock (England) A Ellis	18	14
(Japan) T Kamura (Japan) K Sonoda	21	21
PFQ	(Indonesia) C Rusdianto (Indonesia) T Wardhana	21	21
PFQ	(Thailand) B Isara (Thailand) P Vilailak	17	19
(Chinese Taipei) Lee S-m (Chinese Taipei) Tsai C-h	21	24
(Japan) H Hashimoto (Japan) N Hirata	19	22
(Indonesia) M Ahsan (Indonesia) H Setiawan	21	21
8	(Malaysia) Goh V S (Malaysia) Lim K W	19	12
(Malaysia) Gan T C (Malaysia) Ong S H	21	13	16
(Indonesia) A Y Chandra (Indonesia) M Kido	15	21	21
(Germany) I Kindervater (Germany) J Schöttler	12	16
2	(Japan) H Endo (Japan) K Hayakawa	21	21

Second Round
(South Korea) Kang J-w (South Korea) Lee S-j	14	19
5	(China) Cai Y (China) Fu HF	21	21
(Japan) T Kamura (Japan) K Sonoda	17	21	21
PFQ	(Indonesia) C Rusdianto (Indonesia) T Wardhana	21	16	16
(Chinese Taipei) Lee S-m (Chinese Taipei) Tsai C-h	17	18
(Indonesia) M Ahsan (Indonesia) H Setiawan	21	21
(Indonesia) A Y Chandra (Indonesia) M Kido	15	16
2	(Japan) H Endo (Japan) K Hayakawa	21	21

Quarterfinals
5	(China) Cai Y (China) Fu HF	24	21
(Japan) T Kamura (Japan) K Sonoda	22	14
(Indonesia) M Ahsan (Indonesia) H Setiawan	21	23
2	(Japan) H Endo (Japan) K Hayakawa	15	21

Semifinals
5	(China) Cai Y (China) Fu HF	16	14
(Indonesia) M Ahsan (Indonesia) H Setiawan	21	21

=== Finals ===
Semifinals
1	(South Korea) Ko Sung-hyun (South Korea) Lee Yong-dae	21	21
6	(South Korea) Shin Baek-cheol (South Korea) Yoo Yeon-seong	15	19
5	(China) Cai Yun (China) Fu Haifeng	16	14
(Indonesia) Mohammad Ahsan (Indonesia) Hendra Setiawan	21	21

Final
1	(South Korea) Ko Sung-hyun (South Korea) Lee Yong-dae	15	18
(Indonesia) Mohammad Ahsan (Indonesia) Hendra Setiawan	21	21

== Women's doubles ==
=== Seeds ===
1. (China) Wang Xiaoli / Yu Yang
2. (Japan) Misaki Matsutomo / Ayaka Takahashi
3. (China) Ma Jin / Tang Jinhua
4. (Thailand) Duanganong Aroonkesorn / Kunchala Voravichitchaikul
5. (China) Tian Qing / Zhao Yunlei
6. (Indonesia) Pia Zebadiah Bernadet / Rizki Amelia Pradipta
7. (China) Bao Yixin / Cheng Shu
8. (South Korea) Jung Kyung-eun / Kim Ha-na

=== Top half ===
First Round
PFQ	(Chinese Taipei) Chiang K-h (Chinese Taipei) Tsai P-l	12	11
Q4	(Japan) R Kakiiwa (Japan) M Maeda	21	21
(India) A Balan (India) N S Reddy	21	18	6
(Malaysia) Lee M Y (Malaysia) Lim Y L	18	21	21
5	(China) Tian Q (China) Zhao YL	21	21
(Indonesia) G R Imawan (Indonesia) T R Nuraidah	16	13
(England) H Olver (England) K Robertshaw	15	14
(Germany) J Goliszewski (Germany) B Michels	21	21
4	(Thailand) D Aroonkesorn (Thailand) K Voravichitchaikul	18	21	18
(South Korea) Lee S-h (South Korea) Shin S-c	21	18	21
(Indonesia) N K Maheswari (Indonesia) G Polii	21	21	21
(India) P Gadre (India) A Ponnappa	18	23	16
8	(South Korea) Jung K-e (South Korea) Kim H-n	21	21
(Indonesia) A P L Variella (Indonesia) V Marissa	7	13
Q3	(South Korea) Chang Y-n (South Korea) Kim S-y	22	21
Q1	(Singapore) E Chua (Singapore) Yeo J M	20	11

Second Round
Q4	(Japan) R Kakiiwa (Japan) M Maeda	21	21
(Malaysia) Lee M Y (Malaysia) Lim Y L	15	11
5	(China) Tian Q (China) Zhao YL	21
(Germany) J Goliszewski (Germany) B Michels	4	r
(South Korea) Lee S-h (South Korea) Shin S-c	12	17
(Indonesia) N K Maheswari (Indonesia) G Polii	21	21
8	(South Korea) Jung K-y (South Korea) Kim H-n	21	21
Q3	(South Korea) Chang Y-n (South Korea) Kim S-y	18	14

Quarterfinals
Q4	(Japan) R Kakiiwa (Japan) M Maeda	15	13
5	(China) Tian Q (China) Zhao YL	21	21
(Indonesia) N K Maheswari (Indonesia) G Polii	21	22
8	(South Korea) Jung K-y (South Korea) Kim H-n	12	20

Semifinals
5	(China) Tian Q (China) Zhao YL	21	13	21
(Indonesia) N K Maheswari (Indonesia) G Polii	16	21	18

=== Bottom half ===
First Round
(Hong Kong) Poon L Y (Hong Kong) Tse Y S	21	21
(Bulgaria) G Stoeva (Bulgaria) S Stoeva	13	16
(Thailand) N Lam (Thailand) S Thungthongkam	16	18
6	(Indonesia) P Z Bernadet (Indonesia) R A Pradipta	21	21
(Japan) Y Miki (Japan) K Yonemoto	16	21	19
(England) L Smith (England) G White	21	19	21
(Japan) M Aratama (Japan) M Taruno	14	9
3	(China) Ma J (China) Tang JH	21	21
(Thailand) P Supajirakul (Thailand) S Taerattanachai	21	21
(Malaysia) V Hoo (Malaysia) Woon K W	19	17
(Indonesia) S R Andini (Indonesia) J Gozali	16	13
7	(China) Bao YX (China) Cheng S	21	21
Q2	(Singapore) V Neo (Singapore) Yao L	21	15
(Japan) N Fukuman (Japan) K Yonao	23	21
(Thailand) S Artima (Thailand) P Munkitamorn	11	14
2	(Japan) M Matsutomo (Japan) A Takahashi	21	21

Second Round
(Hong Kong) Poon L Y (Hong Kong) Tse Y S	12	21	19
6	(Indonesia) P Z Bernadet (Indonesia) R A Pradipta	21	19	21
(England) L Smith (England) G White	9	11
3	(China) Ma J (China) Tang JH	21	21
(Thailand) P Supajirakul (Thailand) S Taerattanachai	21	19	20
7	(China) Bao YX (China) Cheng S	18	21	22
(Japan) N Fukuman (Japan) K Yonao	15	13
2	(Japan) M Matsutomo (Japan) A Takahashi	21	21

Quarterfinals
6	(Indonesia) P Z Bernadet (Indonesia) R A Pradipta	21	18	24
3	(China) Ma J (China) Tang JH	19	21	22
7	(China) Bao YX (China) Cheng S	9	18
2	(Japan) M Matsutomo (Japan) A Takahashi	21	21

Semifinals
6	(Indonesia) P Z Bernadet (Indonesia) R A Pradipta	17	16
2	(Japan) M Matsutomo (Japan) A Takahashi	21	21

=== Finals ===
Semifinals
5	(China) Tian Qing (China) Zhao Yunlei	21	13	21
(Indonesia) Nitya Krishinda Maheswari (Indonesia) Greysia Polii	16	21	18
6	(Indonesia) Pia Zebadiah Bernadet (Indonesia) Rizki Amelia Pradipta	17	16
2	(Japan) Misaki Matsutomo (Japan) Ayaka Takahashi	21	21

Final
5	(China) Tian Qing (China) Zhao Yunlei	21	21
2	(Japan) Misaki Matsutomo (Japan) Ayaka Takahashi	19	16

== Mixed doubles ==
=== Seeds ===
1. (China) Xu Chen / Ma Jin
2. (China) Zhang Nan / Zhao Yunlei
3. (Indonesia) Tontowi Ahmad / Liliyana Natsir
4. (Thailand) Sudket Prapakamol / Saralee Thungthongkam
5. (Indonesia) Muhammad Rijal / Debby Susanto
6. (Poland) Robert Mateusiak / Nadieżda Zięba
7. (Indonesia) Fran Kurniawan / Shendy Puspa Irawati
8. (Indonesia) Markis Kido / Pia Zebadiah Bernadet

=== Top half ===
First Round
PFQ	(India) A Vishnu (India) A Balan	21	19	21
(Thailand) S Anugritayawon (Thailand) K Voravichitchaikul	17	21	12
(Indonesia) P Jordan (Indonesia) V Marissa	21	22
Q1	(Singapore) T Hee (Singapore) Fu MT	16	20
5	(Indonesia) M Rijal (Indonesia) D Susanto	22	21
Q2	(Germany) J Schöttler (Germany) J Goliszewki	20	11
Q4	(Singapore) Tan Z J (Singapore) D Yuliana	7	6
Q3	(Japan) R Taohata (Japan) N Fukuman	21	21
3	(Indonesia) T Ahmad (Indonesia) L Natsir	21	21
(India) T Kona (India) A Ponnappa	6	10
(South Korea) Kang J-w (South Korea) Shin S-c	11	21	13
(Malaysia) Ong J G (Malaysia) Lim Y L	21	10	21
6	(Poland) R Mateusiak (Poland) N Zięba	15	19
(England) C Adcock (England) G White	21	21
(England) M Ellis (England) A Lim	10	6
(Japan) K Hayakawa (Japan) M Matsutomo	21	21

Second Round
PFQ	(India) A Vishnu (India) A Balan	10	18
(Indonesia) P Jordan (Indonesia) V Marissa	21	21
5	(Indonesia) M Rijal (Indonesia) D Susanto	21	21
Q3	(Japan) R Taohata (Japan) N Fukuman	13	13
3	(Indonesia) T Ahmad (Indonesia) L Natsir	22	21
(Malaysia) Ong J G (Malaysia) Lim Y L	20	13
(England) C Adcock (England) G White	21	21
(Japan) K Hayakawa (Japan) M Matsutomo	16	12

Quarterfinals
(Indonesia) P Jordan (Indonesia) V Marissa	21	14	21
5	(Indonesia) M Rijal (Indonesia) D Susanto	17	21	13
3	(Indonesia) T Ahmad (Indonesia) L Natsir	21	21
(England) C Adcock (England) G White	14	7

Semifinals
(Indonesia) P Jordan (Indonesia) V Marissa	11	21	18
3	(Indonesia) T Ahmad (Indonesia) L Natsir	21	16	21

=== Bottom half ===
First Round
PFQ	(Singapore) T Yeo (Singapore) Yao L	21	22
(Japan) H Hashimoto (Japan) M Maeda	17	20
(Hong Kong) Lee C H (Hong Kong) Chau H W	21	21
7	(Indonesia) F Kurniawan (Indonesia) S P Irawati	10	16
(South Korea) Shin B-c (South Korea) Chang Y-n	21	21
(Indonesia) M F Gideon (Indonesia) A P L Variella	16	4
(Hong Kong) Chan Y L (Hong Kong) Tse Y S	21	14	19
4	(Thailand) S Prapakamol (Thailand) S Thungthongkam	19	21	21
(Japan) T Kamura (Japan) K Yonemoto	11	12
(South Korea) Yoo Y-s (South Korea) Eom H-w	21	21
(England) C Langridge (England) H Olver	21	21
8	(Indonesia) M Kido (Indonesia) P Z Bernadet	19	19
(South Korea) Ko S-h (South Korea) Kim H-n	21	21
(Singapore) D B Chrisnanta (Singapore) V Neo	16	18
(Germany) M Fuchs (Germany) B Michels	14	11
2	(China) Zhang N (China) Zhao YL	21	21

Second Round
PFQ	(Singapore) T Yeo (Singapore) Yao L	15	10
(Hong Kong) Lee C H (Hong Kong) Chau H W	21	21
(South Korea) Shin B-c (South Korea) Chang Y-n	21	21
4	(Thailand) S Prapakamol (Thailand) S Thungthongkam	19	16
(South Korea) Yoo Y-s (South Korea) Eom H-w	21	21
(England) C Langridge (England) H Olver	11	12
(South Korea) Ko S-h (South Korea) Kim H-n	21	23
2	(China) Zhang N (China) Zhao YL	15	21

Quarterfinals
(Hong Kong) Lee C H (Hong Kong) Chau H W	17	15
(South Korea) Shin B-c (South Korea) Chang Y-n	21	21
(South Korea) Yoo Y-s (South Korea) Eom H-w	22	21
(South Korea) Ko S-h (South Korea) Kim H-n	20	14

Semifinals
(South Korea) Shin B-c (South Korea) Chang Y-n	13	17
(South Korea) Yoo Y-s (South Korea) Eom H-w	21	21

=== Finals ===
Semifinals
(Indonesia) Praveen Jordan (Indonesia) Vita Marissa	11	21	18
3	(Indonesia) Tontowi Ahmad (Indonesia) Liliyana Natsir	21	16	21
(South Korea) Shin Baek-cheol (South Korea) Jang Ye-na	13	17
(South Korea) Yoo Yeon-seong (South Korea) Eom Hye-won	21	21

Final
3	(Indonesia) Tontowi Ahmad (Indonesia) Liliyana Natsir	21	21
(South Korea) Yoo Yeon-seong (South Korea) Eom Hye-won	12	12

Preceded by 2012 Singapore Super Series	Singapore Super Series	Succeeded by 2014 Singapore Super Series
Preceded by 2013 Indonesia Super Series Premier	BWF Super Series; 2013 season	Succeeded by 2013 China Masters
