= 2013 Sudirman Cup group stage =

This article lists the complete results of the group stage of the 2013 Sudirman Cup Group 1 in Kuala Lumpur, Malaysia.

== Group 1A ==
Pos	Team	Pld	W	L	MF	MA	MD	GF	GA	GD	PF	PA	PD	Pts	Qualification	People's Republic of China	Indonesia	India
1	China	2	2	0	10	0	+10	20	3	+17	472	322	+150	2	Advance to knockout stage	—	5–0	5–0
2	Indonesia	2	1	1	4	6	−2	10	12	−2	359	395	−36	1	Advance to knockout stage		—	4–1
3	India	2	0	2	1	9	−8	3	18	−15	320	434	−114	0				—

Source: TournamentSoftware.com

=== China vs India ===
China
5
Bukit Jalil National Sports Complex Court 1
19 May 2013

India
0

			1	2	3
1	(China) (India)	Zhang Nan / Zhao Yunlei; Tarun Kona / Ashwini Ponnappa	21; 10	21; 13
2	(China) (India)	Chen Long; Kashyap Parupalli	21; 11	21; 9
3	(China) (India)	Liu Xiaolong / Qiu Zihan; Pranav Chopra / Akshay Dewalkar	25; 23	21; 18
4	(China) (India)	Wang Yihan; Pusarla Venkata Sindhu	19; 21	21; 16	21; 14
5	(China) (India)	Wang Xiaoli / Yu Yang; Pradnya Gadre / Ashwini Ponnappa	21; 18	21; 11

=== Indonesia vs India ===
Indonesia
4
Bukit Jalil National Sports Complex Court 1
20 May 2013

India
1

			1	2	3
1	(Indonesia) (India)	Angga Pratama / Rian Agung Saputro; Pranav Chopra / Akshay Dewalkar	21; 13	21; 10
2	(Indonesia) (India)	Lindaweni Fanetri; Pusarla Venkata Sindhu	21; 15	21; 10
3	(Indonesia) (India)	Dionysius Hayom Rumbaka; Kashyap Parupalli	18; 21	14; 21
4	(Indonesia) (India)	Greysia Polii / Nitya Krishinda Maheswari; Pradnya Gadre / Ashwini Ponnappa	21; 19	22; 20
5	(Indonesia) (India)	Tontowi Ahmad / Lilyana Natsir; Arun Vishnu / Aparna Balan	21; 13	21; 14

=== China vs Indonesia ===
China
5
Bukit Jalil National Sports Complex Court 2
21 May 2013

Indonesia
0

			1	2	3
1	(China) (Indonesia)	Cai Yun / Fu Haifeng; Angga Pratama / Hendra Setiawan	16; 21	21; 15	21; 15
2	(China) (Indonesia)	Li Xuerui; Aprilia Yuswandari	13; 21	21; 4	21; 11
3	(China) (Indonesia)	Chen Long; Tommy Sugiarto	21; 17	21; 11
4	(China) (Indonesia)	Wang Xiaoli / Yu Yang; Greysia Polii / Nitya Krishinda Maheswari	21; 10	21; 13
5	(China) (Indonesia)	Xu Chen / Ma Jin; Muhammad Rijal / Debby Susanto	21; 13	21; 7

== Group 1B ==
Team	Pts	Pld	W	L	MF	MA
South Korea	2	2	2	0	9	1
Thailand	1	2	1	1	3	7
Hong Kong	0	2	0	2	3	7

=== Thailand vs Hong Kong ===
Thailand
3
Bukit Jalil National Sports Complex Court 1
19 May 2013

Hong Kong
2

			1	2	3
1	(Thailand) (Hong Kong)	Maneepong Jongjit / Nipitphon Puangpuapech; Wong Wai Hong / Chan Yun Lung	21; 14	21; 18
2	(Thailand) (Hong Kong)	Ratchanok Inthanon; Yip Pui Yin	21; 19	21; 16
3	(Thailand) (Hong Kong)	Boonsak Ponsana; Hu Yun	21; 19	20; 22	19; 21
4	(Thailand) (Hong Kong)	Duanganong Aroonkesorn / Kunchala Voravichitchaikul; Poon Lok Yan / Tse Ying Suet	13; 21	21; 15	14; 21
5	(Thailand) (Hong Kong)	Sudket Prapakamol / Saralee Thoungthongkam; Lee Chun Hei / Chau Hoi Wah	24; 22	22; 20

=== Korea vs Hong Kong ===
South Korea
4
Bukit Jalil National Sports Complex Court 1
20 May 2013

Hong Kong
1

			1	2	3
1	(South Korea) (Hong Kong)	Ko Sung-hyun / Kim Ha-na; Lee Chun Hei / Chau Hoi Wah	18; 21	14; 21
2	(South Korea) (Hong Kong)	Lee Dong-keun; Wong Wing Ki	21; 16	21; 15
3	(South Korea) (Hong Kong)	Kim Ki-jung / Kim Sa-rang; Chan Yun Lung / Ng Ka Long	21; 14	21; 17
4	(South Korea) (Hong Kong)	Sung Ji-hyun; Yip Pui Yin	21; 17	21; 14
5	(South Korea) (Hong Kong)	Jung Kyung-eun / Kim Ha-na; Poon Lok Yan / Tse Ying Suet	21; 10	21; 15

=== Thailand vs Korea ===
Thailand
0
Bukit Jalil National Sports Complex Court 2
21 May 2013

South Korea
5

			1	2	3
1	(Thailand) (South Korea)	Sudket Prapakamol / Saralee Thoungthongkam; Ko Sung-hyun / Kim Ha-na	9; 21	10; 21
2	(Thailand) (South Korea)	Tanongsak Saensomboonsuk; Lee Dong-keun	21; 12	9; 21	20; 22
3	(Thailand) (South Korea)	Maneepong Jongjit / Nipitphon Puangpuapech; Ko Sung-hyun / Lee Yong-dae	10; 21	14; 21
4	(Thailand) (South Korea)	Nichaon Jindapon; Sung Ji-hyun	11; 21	7; 21
5	(Thailand) (South Korea)	Duanganong Aroonkesorn / Kunchala Voravichitchaikul; Jung Kyung-eun / Kim Ha-na	16; 21	21; 17	11; 21

== Group 1C ==
Team	Pts	Pld	W	L	MF	MA
Chinese Taipei	2	2	2	0	8	2
Germany	1	2	1	1	3	7
Malaysia	0	2	0	2	4	6

=== Malaysia vs Chinese Taipei ===
Malaysia
2
Bukit Jalil National Sports Complex Court 2
19 May 2013

Chinese Taipei
3

			1	2	3
1	(Malaysia) (Chinese Taipei)	Koo Kien Keat / Tan Boon Heong; Lee Sheng-mu / Tsai Chia-hsin	18; 21	18; 21
2	(Malaysia) (Chinese Taipei)	Sonia Cheah Su Ya; Tai Tzu-ying	7; 21	13; 21
3	(Malaysia) (Chinese Taipei)	Lee Chong Wei; Yang Chih-hsun	21; 8	21; 13
4	(Malaysia) (Chinese Taipei)	Vivian Hoo Kah Mun / Woon Khe Wei; Cheng Wen-hsing / Hsieh Pei-chen	17; 21	19; 21
5	(Malaysia) (Chinese Taipei)	Chan Peng Soon / Goh Liu Ying; Lu Ching-yao / Lai Chia-wen	25; 23	21; 11

=== Germany vs Chinese Taipei ===
Germany
0
Bukit Jalil National Sports Complex Court 2
20 May 2013

Chinese Taipei
5

			1	2	3
1	(Germany) (Chinese Taipei)	Michael Fuchs / Birgit Michels; Lu Ching-yao / Lai Chia-wen	21; 13	20; 22	21; 23
2	(Germany) (Chinese Taipei)	Dieter Domke; Hsueh Hsuan-yi	20; 22	14; 21
3	(Germany) (Chinese Taipei)	Ingo Kindervater / Johannes Schoettler; Lee Sheng-mu / Tsai Chia-hsin	18; 21	7; 21
4	(Germany) (Chinese Taipei)	Karin Schnaase; Tai Tzu-ying	15; 21	21; 23
5	(Germany) (Chinese Taipei)	Birgit Michels / Johanna Goliszewski; Cheng Wen-hsing / Hsieh Pei-chen	21; 13	16; 21	19; 21

=== Malaysia vs Germany ===
Malaysia
2
Bukit Jalil National Sports Complex Court 1
21 May 2013

Germany
3

			1	2	3
1	(Malaysia) (Germany)	Chan Peng Soon / Goh Liu Ying; Michael Fuchs / Birgit Michels	17; 21	21; 18	17; 21
2	(Malaysia) (Germany)	Lee Chong Wei; Dieter Domke	21; 18	21; 18
3	(Malaysia) (Germany)	Goh V Shem / Lim Khim Wah; Ingo Kindervater / Johannes Schoettler	21; 16	23; 21
4	(Malaysia) (Germany)	Tee Jing Yi; Olga Konon	12; 21	14; 21
5	(Malaysia) (Germany)	Vivian Hoo Kah Mun / Woon Khe Wei; Birgit Michels / Johanna Goliszewski	16; 21	21; 16	18; 21

== Group 1D ==
Team	Pts	Pld	W	L	MF	MA
Japan	2	2	2	0	8	2
Denmark	1	2	1	1	6	4
Singapore	0	2	0	2	1	9

May 19, 2013
Denmark	4–1	Singapore
May 20, 2013
Japan	5–0	Singapore
May 21, 2013
Denmark	2–3	Japan
