= 2010 India Grand Prix =

Tournament details
- Dates: 14–19 December
- Level: Grand Prix
- Total prize money: US$50,000
- Venue: Kotla Vijay Bhaskar Reddy Indoor Stadium
- Location: Hyderabad, Andhra Pradesh, India

Champions
- Men's singles: (Indonesia) Dionysius Hayom Rumbaka
- Women's singles: (China) Zhou Hui
- Men's doubles: (Indonesia) Mohammad Ahsan (Indonesia) Bona Septano
- Women's doubles: (China) Tang Jinhua (China) Xia Huan
- Mixed doubles: (China) Liu Peixuan (China) Tang Jinhua

The 2010 India Grand Prix was a badminton tournament that was held at Kotla Vijay Bhaskar Reddy Indoor Stadium in Hyderabad, Andhra Pradesh, India from 14 to 19 December 2010 and had a total purse of $50,000. This tournament was moved from Lucknow to Hyderabad, allegedly due to the infighting in the Badminton Association of India.

== Men's singles ==
=== Seeds ===
1. (Indonesia) Dionysius Hayom Rumbaka (champion)
2. (India) Chetan Anand (third round)
3. (India) Parupalli Kashyap (semi-finals)
4. (Indonesia) Alamsyah Yunus (semi-finals)
5. (India) Ajay Jayaram (third round)
6. (Indonesia) Andre Kurniawan Tedjono (withdrew)
7. (India) Arvind Bhat (quarter-finals)
8. (India) R. M. V. Gurusaidutt (first round)

=== Finals ===
Quarter-finals
1	(Indonesia) Dionysius Hayom Rumbaka	21	21
(India) Aditya Elango	13	8
3	(India) Parupalli Kashyap	18	21	21
(Indonesia) Tommy Sugiarto	21	17	18
(China) Chen Yuekun	18	13
4	(Indonesia) Alamsyah Yunus	21	21
7	(India) Arvind Bhat	18	18
(Thailand) Suppanyu Avihingsanon	21	21

Semi-finals
1	(Indonesia) Dionysius Hayom Rumbaka	21	21
3	(India) Parupalli Kashyap	19	13
4	(Indonesia) Alamsyah Yunus	13	21
(Thailand) Suppanyu Avihingsanon	21	23

Final
1	(Indonesia) Dionysius Hayom Rumbaka	14	21	21
(Thailand) Suppanyu Avihingsanon	21	15	12

== Women's singles ==
=== Seeds ===
1. (India) Saina Nehwal (withdrew)
2. (Indonesia) Maria Febe Kusumastuti (withdrew)
3. (Indonesia) Adriyanti Firdasari (withdrew)
4. (Switzerland) Jeanine Cicognini (withdrew)
5. (Indonesia) Fransisca Ratnasari (final)
6. (India) Aditi Mutatkar (withdrew)
7. (Thailand) Nitchaon Jindapol (first round)
8. (India) Trupti Murgunde (first round)

=== Finals ===
Semi-finals
5	(Indonesia) Fransisca Ratnasari	17	21	21
(India) P. V. Sindhu	21	17	15
(China) Zhou Hui	15	21	21
(Indonesia) Ana Rovita	21	14	14

Final
5	(Indonesia) Fransisca Ratnasari	13	17
(China) Zhou Hui	21	21

== Men's doubles ==
=== Seeds ===
1. (Malaysia) Gan Teik Chai / Tan Bin Shen (final)
2. (Indonesia) Mohammad Ahsan / Bona Septano (champion)
3. (Singapore) Liu Yi / Terry Yeo (second round)
4. (Indonesia) Ricky Karanda Suwardi / Agripinna Prima Rahmanto Putra (semi-finals)

=== Finals ===
Semi-finals
1	(Malaysia) Gan Teik Chai (Malaysia) Tan Bin Shen	21	21	21
4	(Indonesia) Ricky Karanda Suwardi (Indonesia) Agripinna Prima Rahmanto Putra	23	12	19
(Singapore) Hendri Kurniawan Saputra (Singapore) Chayut Triyachart	18	27	13
2	(Indonesia) Mohammad Ahsan (Indonesia) Bona Septano	21	25	21

Final
1	(Malaysia) Gan Teik Chai (Malaysia) Tan Bin Shen	21	15	14
2	(Indonesia) Mohammad Ahsan (Indonesia) Bona Septano	19	21	21

== Women's doubles ==
=== Seeds ===
1. (Indonesia) Anneke Feinya Agustin / Annisa Wahyuni (semi-finals)
2. (Indonesia) Suci Rizky Andini / Della Destiara Haris (semi-finals)
3. (Malaysia) Ng Hui Ern / Ng Hui Lin (final)
4. (Indonesia) Gebby Ristiyani Imawan / Tiara Rosalia Nuraidah (quarter-finals)

=== Finals ===
Semi-finals
1	(Indonesia) Anneke Feinya Agustin (Indonesia) Annisa Wahyuni	21	18	12
(China) Tang Jinhua (China) Xia Huan	13	21	21
3	(Malaysia) Ng Hui Ern (Malaysia) Ng Hui Lin	21	21
2	(Indonesia) Suci Rizky Andini (Indonesia) Della Destiara Haris	14	19

Final
(China) Tang Jinhua (China) Xia Huan	21	21
3	(Malaysia) Ng Hui Ern (Malaysia) Ng Hui Lin	8	19

== Mixed doubles ==
=== Seeds ===
1. (Thailand) Patiphat Chalardchaleam / Savitree Amitrapai (second round)
2. (India) Arun Vishnu / Aparna Balan (quarter-finals)
3. (Indonesia) Irfan Fadhilah / Weni Anggraini (quarter-finals)
4. (India) Pranav Chopra / Prajakta Sawant (quarter-finals)

=== Finals ===
Semi-finals
(Malaysia) Gan Teik Chai (Malaysia) Ng Hui Lin	21	21
(Singapore) Chayut Triyachart (Singapore) Vanessa Neo	17	17
(China) Liu Peixuan (China) Tang Jinhua	21	21
(India) Tarun Kona (India) Ashwini Ponnappa	12	18

Final
(Malaysia) Gan Teik Chai (Malaysia) Ng Hui Lin	17	17
(China) Liu Peixuan (China) Tang Jinhua	21	21
