= 2009 India Open Grand Prix =

Tournament details
- Dates: 15–20 December
- Level: Grand Prix
- Total prize money: US$50,000
- Venue: Babu Banarasi Das Indoor Stadium
- Location: Lucknow, India

Champions
- Men's singles: (India) Chetan Anand
- Women's singles: (India) Saina Nehwal
- Men's doubles: (Indonesia) Fauzi Adnan (Indonesia) Trikusuma Wardhana
- Women's doubles: (Japan) Misaki Matsutomo (Japan) Ayaka Takahashi
- Mixed doubles: (India) Arun Vishnu (India) Aparna Balan

The 2009 India Open Grand Prix also known as Jaypee Cup Syed Modi Memorial India Grand Prix was a badminton tournament which took place at Babu Banarasi Das Indoor Stadium in Lucknow, India from 15 to 20 December 2009. It is the first time this tournament was ranked as BWF Grand Prix event with a total purse of $50,000. It was the last tournament of the 2009 BWF Grand Prix Gold and Grand Prix.

== Men's singles ==
=== Seeds ===
1. (India) Chetan Anand (champion)
2. (India) Arvind Bhat (third round)
3. (Indonesia) Andre Kurniawan Tedjono (quarter-finals)
4. (India) Parupalli Kashyap (quarter-finals)
5. (Indonesia) Dionysius Hayom Rumbaka (final)
6. (India) Anup Sridhar (quarter-finals)
7. (India) Anand Pawar (withdrew)
8. (India) R. M. V. Gurusaidutt (semi-finals)

=== Finals ===
Quarter-finals
1	(India) Chetan Anand	21	21
6	(India) Anup Sridhar	18	10
3	(Indonesia) Andre Kurniawan Tedjono	18	16
8	(India) R. M. V. Gurusaidutt	21	21
5	(Indonesia) Dionysius Hayom Rumbaka	24	19	21
4	(India) Parupalli Kashyap	22	21	12
(India) B. Sai Praneeth	13	20
(Malaysia) Chan Kwong Beng	21	22

Semi-finals
1	(India) Chetan Anand	21	21
8	(India) R. M. V. Gurusaidutt	16	13
5	(Indonesia) Dionysius Hayom Rumbaka	21	21
(Malaysia) Chan Kwong Beng	13	16

Final
1	(India) Chetan Anand	21	19	21
5	(Indonesia) Dionysius Hayom Rumbaka	17	21	16

== Women's singles ==
=== Seeds ===
1. (India) Saina Nehwal (champion)
2. (Indonesia) Maria Febe Kusumastuti (semi-finals)
3. (Slovenia) Maja Tvrdy (second round)
4. (India) Aditi Mutatkar (final)
5. (Indonesia) Fransisca Ratnasari (quarter-finals)
6. (Switzerland) Jeanine Cicognini (semi-finals)
7. (India) Trupti Murgunde (quarter-finals)
8. (India) Sayali Gokhale (first round)

=== Finals ===
Semi-finals
1	(India) Saina Nehwal	21	21
6	(Switzerland) Jeanine Cicognini	12	10
4	(India) Aditi Mutatkar	22	21
2	(Indonesia) Maria Febe Kusumastuti	20	13

Final
1	(India) Saina Nehwal	21	21
4	(India) Aditi Mutatkar	17	13

== Men's doubles ==
=== Seeds ===
1. (India) Akshay Dewalkar / Jishnu Sanyal (final)
2. (India) Tarun Kona / Arun Vishnu (semi-finals)
3. (Iran) Mohammad Reza Kheradmandi / Ali Shahhosseini (quarter-finals)
4. (India) Alwin Francis / Sanker Gopan (semi-finals)

=== Finals ===
Semi-finals
1	(India) Akshay Dewalkar (India) Jishnu Sanyal	19	21	21
4	(India) Alwin Francis (India) Sanker Gopan	21	8	18
(Indonesia) Fauzi Adnan (Indonesia) Trikusuma Wardhana	21	13	21
2	(India) Tarun Kona (India) Arun Vishnu	17	21	16

Final
1	(India) Akshay Dewalkar (India) Jishnu Sanyal	25	25	15
(Indonesia) Fauzi Adnan (Indonesia) Trikusuma Wardhana	27	23	21

== Women's doubles ==
=== Seeds ===
1. (India) Aparna Balan / Shruti Kurien (quarter-finals)
2. (India) Jwala Gutta / Ashwini Ponnappa (withdrew)
3. (Japan) Misaki Matsutomo / Ayaka Takahashi (champion)
4. (India) Anjali Kalita / P. Jyotshna (second round)

=== Finals ===
Semi-finals
(Indonesia) Nadya Melati (Indonesia) Devi Tika Permatasari	21	21
(India) Megha Merin Ninan (India) Prajakta Sawant	15	8
3	(Japan) Misaki Matsutomo (Japan) Ayaka Takahashi	21	23
(Netherlands) Lotte Jonathans (Netherlands) Paulien van Dooremalen	19	21

Final
(Indonesia) Nadya Melati (Indonesia) Devi Tika Permatasari	14	21	15
3	(Japan) Misaki Matsutomo (Japan) Ayaka Takahashi	21	15	21

== Mixed doubles ==
=== Seeds ===
1. (India) Valiyaveetil Diju / Jwala Gutta (withdrew)
2. (India) Arun Vishnu / Aparna Balan (champion)
3. (India) Tarun Kona / Shruti Kurien (final)
4. (India) Akshay Dewalkar / Pradnya Gadre (semi-finals)

=== Finals ===
Semi-finals
(Indonesia) Fauzi Adnan (Indonesia) Devi Tika Permatasari	18	21	16
3	(India) Tarun Kona (India) Shruti Kurien	21	19	21
4	(India) Akshay Dewalkar (India) Pradnya Gadre	21	20	20
2	(India) Arun Vishnu (India) Aparna Balan	18	22	22

Final
3	(India) Tarun Kona (India) Shruti Kurien	14	21	19
2	(India) Arun Vishnu (India) Aparna Balan	21	17	21
