= 2013 Indonesia Super Series Premier =

Tournament details
- Dates: 10–16 June
- Edition: 32nd
- Level: Super Series Premier
- Total prize money: US$700,000
- Venue: Istora Gelora Bung Karno
- Location: Jakarta, Indonesia

Champions
- Men's singles: (Malaysia) Lee Chong Wei
- Women's singles: (China) Li Xuerui
- Men's doubles: (Indonesia) Mohammad Ahsan (Indonesia) Hendra Setiawan
- Women's doubles: (China) Bao Yixin (China) Cheng Shu
- Mixed doubles: (China) Zhang Nan (China) Zhao Yunlei

The 2013 Indonesia Super Series Premier was the fifth super series tournament of the 2013 BWF Super Series. The tournament was held in Jakarta, Indonesia on 10 to 16 June 2013 and had a total purse of $700,000. A qualification was held to fill four places in all five disciplines of the main draws.

== Men's singles ==
=== Seeds ===
1. (Malaysia) Lee Chong Wei (champions)
2. (China) Chen Long (first round)
3. (China) Du Pengyu (quarterfinals)
4. (Indonesia) Sony Dwi Kuncoro (second round)
5. (Japan) Kenichi Tago (first round)
6. (Hong Kong) Hu Yun (first round)
7. (Denmark) Jan Ø. Jørgensen (first round)
8. (Thailand) Boonsak Ponsana (quarterfinals)

=== Top half ===
First Round
1	(Malaysia) Lee C W	20	21	22
(China) Wang ZM	22	4	20
(Indonesia) T Hidayat	21	12	17
Q3	(India) B. Sai Praneeth	15	21	21
8	(Thailand) B Ponsana	2
(Denmark) V Axelsen	1^{r}
(India) P Kashyap	7	8
(Japan) S Sasaki	21	21
3	(China) Du PY	21	21
(Vietnam) Nguyễn T M	19	15
PFQ	(India) S Varma	19	21	21
(Denmark) H-K Vittinghus	21	14	15
6	(Hong Kong) Hu Y	13	21	19
(Japan) T Ueda	21	12	21
(Russia) V Ivanov	21	6	18
(Indonesia) D H Rumbaka	17	21	21

Second Round
1	(Malaysia) Lee C W	21	21
Q3	(India) B. Sai Praneeth	18	12
8	(Thailand) B Ponsana	21	21
(Japan) S Sasaki	13	19
3	(China) Du PY	21	21
PFQ	(India) S Varma	16	6
(Japan) T Ueda	21	12	20
(Indonesia) D H Rumbaka	18	21	22

Quarterfinals
1	(Malaysia) Lee C W	21	21
8	(Thailand) B Ponsana	10	7
3	(China) Du PY	15	21	9
(Indonesia) D H Rumbaka	21	15	21

Semifinals
1	(Malaysia) Lee C W	21	21
(Indonesia) D H Rumbaka	17	14

=== Bottom half ===
First Round
(Germany) M Zwiebler	21	21
(Chinese Taipei) Hsu J-h	11	10
(Indonesia) A Yunus	24	16	21
5	(Japan) K Tago	22	21	17
(India) A Jayaram	22	8	21
Q2	(Indonesia) R Subagja	20	21	12
(China) Chen YK	17	21	19
4	(Indonesia) S D Kuncoro	21	10	21
(India) G Dutt	22	21
Q1	(Indonesia) A K Tedjono	20	16
Q4	(Japan) K Sakai	21	21
7	(Denmark) J Ø Jørgensen	16	19
(England) R Ouseph	7	22
(Hong Kong) Wong W K	21	24
(Indonesia) T Sugiarto	21	21
2	(China) Chen L	11	18

Second Round
(Germany) M Zwiebler	21	21
(Indonesia) A Yunus	16	15
(India) A Jayaram	22	21
4	(Indonesia) S D Kuncoro	20	12
(India) G Dutt	21	9	21
Q4	(Japan) K Sakai	12	21	19
(Hong Kong) Wong W K	18	16
(Indonesia) T Sugiarto	21	21

Quarterfinals
(Germany) M Zwiebler	21	21
(India) A Jayaram	16	15
(India) G Dutt	21	11	10
(Indonesia) T Sugiarto	19	21	21

Semifinals
(Germany) M Zwiebler	21	21
(Indonesia) T Sugiarto	17	10

=== Finals ===
Semifinals
1	(Malaysia) Lee Chong Wei	21	21
(Indonesia) Dionysius Hayom Rumbaka	17	14
(Germany) Marc Zwiebler	21	21
(Indonesia) Tommy Sugiarto	17	10

Final
1	(Malaysia) Lee Chong Wei	21	21
(Germany) Marc Zwiebler	15	14

== Women's singles ==
=== Seeds ===
1. (China) Li Xuerui (champions)
2. (India) Saina Nehwal (semifinals)
3. (China) Wang Yihan (first round)
4. (Germany) Juliane Schenk (final)
5. (Thailand) Ratchanok Intanon (withdrew)
6. (South Korea) Sung Ji-hyun (first round)
7. (China) Wang Shixian (first round)
8. (Chinese Taipei) Tai Tzu-ying (quarterfinals)

=== Top half ===
First Round
1	(China) Li XR	21	21
(Thailand) S Taerattanachai	12	13
Q3	(Japan) K Imabeppu	21	20	21
(Chinese Taipei) Pai H-m	12	22	14
5	(Thailand) R Intanon
PFQ	(Indonesia) H Desi	w	/	o
Q4	(Indonesia) H Ramadhini	18	10
(South Korea) Bae Y-j	21	21
3	(China) Wang YH	21	19	18
(Hong Kong) Yip P Y	12	21	21
(Japan) M Mitani	21	13	25
(Singapore) Gu J	18	21	23
6	(South Korea) Sung J-h	21	16	19
PFQ	(Indonesia) B Manuputty	16	21	21
(Hong Kong) Chan T K	15	10
(Bulgaria) P Nedelcheva	21	21

Second Round
1	(China) Li XR	21	21
Q3	(Japan) K Imabeppu	17	18
PFQ	(Indonesia) H Desi	11	21	17
(South Korea) Bae Y-j	21	13	21
(Hong Kong) Yip P Y	21	21
(Japan) M Mitani	18	18
PFQ	(Indonesia) B Manuputty	21	21
(Bulgaria) P Nedelcheva	8	15

Quarterfinals
1	(China) Li XR	21	21
(South Korea) Bae Y-j	10	12
(Hong Kong) Yip P Y	16	23	22
PFQ	(Indonesia) B Manuputty	21	21	20

Semifinals
1	(China) Li XR	17	21	21
(Hong Kong) Yip P Y	21	11	11

=== Bottom half ===
First Round
(Japan) Y Hashimoto	21	21
Q1	(Indonesia) M F Kusumastuti	19	15
Q2	(Republic of Ireland) C Magee	14	14
8	(Chinese Taipei) Tai T-y	21	21
(Indonesia) A Yuswandari	8	21	13
(Japan) E Hirose	21	15	21
(Thailand) N Jindapol	12	11
4	(Germany) J Schenk	21	21
(Indonesia) A Firdasari	13	8
(Spain) C Marín	21	21
(Thailand) B Ongbamrungphan	21	9	21
7	(China) Wang SX	11	21	19
(Japan) S Takahashi	21	21
(Thailand) P Buranaprasertsuk	9	15
(Indonesia) L Fanetri	17	29	13
2	(India) S Nehwal	21	27	21

Second Round
(Japan) Y Hashimoto	16	19
8	(Chinese Taipei) Tai T-y	21	21
(Japan) E Hirose	8	21	14
4	(Germany) J Schenk	21	19	21
(Spain) C Marín	21	21
(Thailand) B Ongbamrungphan	8	16
(Japan) S Takahashi	13	19
2	(India) S Nehwal	21	21

Quarterfinals
8	(Chinese Taipei) Tai T-y	21	21	16
4	(Germany) J Schenk	23	10	21
(Spain) C Marín	16	19
2	(India) S Nehwal	21	21

Semifinals
4	(Germany) J Schenk	12	21	21
2	(India) S Nehwal	21	13	14

=== Finals ===
Semifinals
1	(China) Li Xuerui	17	21	21
(Hong Kong) Yip Pui Yin	21	11	11
4	(Germany) Juliane Schenk	12	21	21
2	(India) Saina Nehwal	21	13	14

Final
1	(China) Li Xuerui	21	18	21
4	(Germany) Juliane Schenk	16	21	17

== Men's doubles ==
=== Seeds ===
1. (Denmark) Mathias Boe / Carsten Mogensen (first round)
2. (South Korea) Ko Sung-hyun / Lee Yong-dae (final)
3. (Malaysia) Koo Kien Keat / Tan Boon Heong (second round)
4. (Japan) Hiroyuki Endo / Kenichi Hayakawa (first round)
5. (China) Cai Yun / Fu Haifeng (quarterfinals)
6. (South Korea) Kim Gi-jung / Kim Sa-rang (first round)
7. (China) Liu Xiaolong / Qiu Zihan (second round)
8. (South Korea) Shin Baek-cheol / Yoo Yeon-seong (semifinals)

=== Top half ===
First Round
1	(Denmark) M Boe (Denmark) C Mogensen	17	23
(Russia) V Ivanov (Russia) I Sozonov	21	25
(Denmark) R Bonde (Denmark) M Conrad-Petersen	21	15	12
(England) C Langridge (England) P Mills	19	21	21
7	(China) Liu XL (China) Qiu ZH	21	16	21
(Japan) H Saeki (Japan) R Taohata	15	21	19
Q3	(Indonesia) W Nayaka (Indonesia) A Yusuf	17	11
(England) C Adcock (England) A Ellis	21	21
4	(Japan) H Endo (Japan) K Hayakawa	22	18	18
(Indonesia) M Ahsan (Indonesia) H Setiawan	20	21	21
(Indonesia) B Angriawan (Indonesia) Y R Sugiarto	26	21
(Germany) I Kindervater (Germany) J Schöttler	24	19
5	(China) Cai Y (China) Fu HF	21	18	21
(Malaysia) M Z A Latif (Malaysia) M F M Tazari	14	21	14
(Malaysia) Hoon T H (Malaysia) Tan W K	21	18	15
Q2	(Indonesia) A Adistia (Indonesia) M F Gideon	10	21	21

Second Round
(Russia) V Ivanov (Russia) I Sozonov	21	10	21
(England) C Langridge (England) P Mills	15	21	16
7	(China) Liu XL (China) Qiu ZH	15^{r}
(England) C Adcock (England) A Ellis	13
(Indonesia) M Ahsan (Indonesia) H Setiawan	21	17	21
(Indonesia) B Angriawan (Indonesia) Y R Sugiarto	13	21	12
5	(China) Cai Y (China) Fu HF	22	21
Q2	(Indonesia) A Adistia (Indonesia) M F Gideon	20	15

Quarterfinals
(Russia) V Ivanov (Russia) I Sozonov	21	21
(England) C Adcock (England) A Ellis	18	18
(Indonesia) M Ahsan (Indonesia) H Setiawan	21	21
5	(China) Cai Y (China) Fu HF	18	13

Semifinals
(Russia) V Ivanov (Russia) I Sozonov	10	22	14
(Indonesia) M Ahsan (Indonesia) H Setiawan	21	20	21

=== Bottom half ===
First Round
(Poland) Ł Moren (Poland) W Szkudlarczyk	16	18
(Thailand) M Jongjit (Thailand) N Phuangphuapet	21	21
(China) Guo ZD (China) Shen Y	17	21
8	(South Korea) Shin B-c (South Korea) Yoo Y-s	21	23
Q1	(Indonesia) R Wijaya (Indonesia) R Sukmawan	21	14	14
(Indonesia) A Y Chandra (Indonesia) M Kido	18	21	21
(Indonesia) Y S Dasuki (Indonesia) H A Gunawan	15	11
3	(Malaysia) Koo K K (Malaysia) Tan B H	21	21
(Malaysia) Gan T C (Malaysia) Ong S H	21	8	11
Q4	(Japan) T Kamura (Japan) K Sonoda	14	21	21
(Indonesia) R K Suwardi (Indonesia) M Ulinnuha	4
6	(South Korea) Kim G-j (South Korea) Kim S-r	1^{r}
(Indonesia) A Pratama (Indonesia) R A Saputro	17	16
(Chinese Taipei) Lee S-m (Chinese Taipei) Tsai C-h	21	21
(Japan) H Hashimoto (Japan) N Hirata	18	21	9
2	(South Korea) Ko S-h (South Korea) Lee Y-d	21	19	21

Second Round
(Thailand) M Jongjit (Thailand) N Phuangphuapet	14	21	13
8	(South Korea) Shin B-c (South Korea) Yoo Y-s	21	19	21
(Indonesia) A Y Chandra (Indonesia) M Kido	23	21
3	(Malaysia) Koo K K (Malaysia) Tan B H	21	15
Q4	(Japan) T Kamura (Japan) K Sonoda	21	21
(Indonesia) R K Suwardi (Indonesia) M Ulinnuha	12	16
(Chinese Taipei) Lee S-m (Chinese Taipei) Tsai C-h	11	18
2	(South Korea) Ko S-h (South Korea) Lee Y-d	21	21

Quarterfinals
8	(South Korea) Shin B-c (South Korea) Yoo Y-s	19	21	21
(Indonesia) A Y Chandra (Indonesia) M Kido	21	14	17
Q4	(Japan) T Kamura (Japan) K Sonoda	19	11
2	(South Korea) Ko S-h (South Korea) Lee Y-d	21	21

Semifinals
8	(South Korea) Shin B-c (South Korea) Yoo Y-s	13	16
2	(South Korea) Ko S-h (South Korea) Lee Y-d	21	21

=== Finals ===
Semifinals
(Russia) Vladimir Ivanov (Russia) Ivan Sozonov	10	22	14
(Indonesia) Mohammad Ahsan (Indonesia) Hendra Setiawan	21	20	21
8	(South Korea) Shin Baek-cheol (South Korea) Yoo Yeon-seong	13	16
2	(South Korea) Ko Sung-hyun (South Korea) Lee Yong-dae	21	21

Final
(Indonesia) Mohammad Ahsan (Indonesia) Hendra Setiawan	21	21
2	(South Korea) Ko Sung-hyun (South Korea) Lee Yong-dae	14	18

== Women's doubles ==
=== Seeds ===
1. (China) Wang Xiaoli / Yu Yang (final)
2. (Japan) Misaki Matsutomo / Ayaka Takahashi (quarterfinals)
3. (Denmark) Christinna Pedersen / Kamilla Rytter Juhl (first round)
4. (China) Ma Jin / Tang Jinhua (semifinals)
5. (China) Tian Qing / Zhao Yunlei (semifinals)
6. (Thailand) Duanganong Aroonkesorn / Kunchala Voravichitchaikul (first round)
7. (Indonesia) Pia Zebadiah Bernadet / Rizki Amelia Pradipta (quarterfinals)
8. (China) Bao Yixin / Cheng Shu (champions)

=== Top half ===
First Round
1	(China) Wang XL (China) Yu Y	21	21
(Japan) N Fukuman (Japan) K Yonao	15	10
(Singapore) V Neo (Singapore) S M Sari	16	21	19
(South Korea) Lee S-h (South Korea) Shin S-c	21	18	21
6	(Thailand) D Aroonkesorn (Thailand) K Voravichitchaikul	16	16
(Indonesia) A F Agustin (Indonesia) D D Haris	21	21
(Macau) Wang R (Macau) Zhang ZB	16	21	20
(India) P Gadre (India) A Ponnappa	21	15	22
4	(China) Ma J (China) Tang JH	21	21
(Indonesia) S R Andini (Indonesia) J Gozali	12	10
(Indonesia) K Dewi (Indonesia) M Jauhari	21	18	9
(Germany) J Goliszewski (Germany) B Michels	16	21	21
7	(Indonesia) P Z Bernadet (Indonesia) R A Pradipta	21	21
(England) H Olver (England) K Robertshaw	13	14
(England) L Smith (England) G White	21	21
(Japan) Y Miki (Japan) K Yonemoto	12	10

Second Round
1	(China) Wang XL (China) Yu Y	24	21
(South Korea) Lee S-h (South Korea) Shin S-c	22	14
(Indonesia) A F Agustin (Indonesia) D D Haris	21	21
(India) P Gadre (India) A Ponnappa	13	19
4	(China) Ma J (China) Tang JH	21	19	21
(Germany) J Goliszewski (Germany) B Michels	15	21	11
7	(Indonesia) P Z Bernadet (Indonesia) R A Pradipta	21	19	21
(England) L Smith (England) G White	19	21	12

Quarterfinals
1	(China) Wang XL (China) Yu Y	21	15	21
(Indonesia) A F Agustin (Indonesia) D D Haris	13	21	12
4	(China) Ma J (China) Tang JH	21	21
7	(Indonesia) P Z Bernadet (Indonesia) R A Pradipta	15	10

Semifinals
1	(China) Wang XL (China) Yu Y	21	21
4	(China) Ma J (China) Tang JH	18	16

=== Bottom half ===
First Round
Q4	(Japan) R Kakiiwa (Japan) M Maeda	21	21
(Hong Kong) Poon L Y (Hong Kong) Tse Y S	17	9
(South Korea) Jung K-e (South Korea) Kim H-n	16	21	19
8	(China) Bao YX (China) Cheng S	21	16	21
Q2	(India) A Balan (India) N S Reddy	12	17
(Indonesia) G R Imawan (Indonesia) T R Nuraidah	21	21
(Indonesia) N K Maheswari (Indonesia) G Polii	22	17	22
3	(Denmark) C Pedersen (Denmark) K Rytter Juhl	20	21	20
(Denmark) L Damkjær Kruse (Denmark) M Rœpke	21	17	12
Q1	(South Korea) Chang Y-n (South Korea) Kim S-y	15	21	21
(Russia) T Bibik (Russia) A Chervaikova	14	14
5	(China) Tian Q (China) Zhao YL	21	21
(Indonesia) A P L Variella (Indonesia) V Marissa	21	21
(Bulgaria) G Stoeva (Bulgaria) S Stoeva	14	6
Q3	(Indonesia) R Amelia (Indonesia) A S Awanda	26	21	19
2	(Japan) M Matsutomo (Japan) A Takahashi	28	14	21

Second Round
Q4	(Japan) R Kakiiwa (Japan) M Maeda	11	22	14
8	(China) Bao YX (China) Cheng S	21	20	21
(Indonesia) G R Imawan (Indonesia) T R Nuraidah	15	18
(Indonesia) N K Maheswari (Indonesia) G Polii	21	21
Q1	(South Korea) Chang Y-n (South Korea) Kim S-y	9	11
5	(China) Tian Q (China) Zhao YL	21	21
(Indonesia) A P L Variessa (Indonesia) V Marissa	19	16
2	(Japan) M Matsutomo (Japan) A Takahashi	21	21

Quarterfinals
5	(China) Bao YX (China) Cheng S	21	22
(Indonesia) N K Maheswari (Indonesia) G Polii	15	20
5	(China) Tian Q (China) Zhao YL	21	15	21
2	(Japan) M Matsutomo (Japan) A Takahashi	16	21	19

Semifinals
8	(China) Bao YX (China) Cheng S	21	22
5	(China) Tian Q (China) Zhao YL	17	20

=== Finals ===
Semifinals
1	(China) Wang Xiaoli (China) Yu Yang	21	21
4	(China) Ma Jin (China) Tang Jinhua	18	16
8	(China) Bao Yixin (China) Cheng Shu	21	22
5	(China) Tian Qing (China) Zhao Yunlei	17	20

Final
1	(China) Wang Xiaoli (China) Yu Yang	21	18	18
8	(China) Bao Yixin (China) Cheng Shu	15	21	21

== Mixed doubles ==
=== Seeds ===
1. (China) Xu Chen / Ma Jin (semifinals)
2. (Indonesia) Tontowi Ahmad / Liliyana Natsir (semifinals)
3. (China) Zhang Nan / Zhao Yunlei (champions)
4. (Denmark) Joachim Fischer Nielsen / Christinna Pedersen (final)
5. (Malaysia) Chan Peng Soon / Goh Liu Ying (quarterfinals)
6. (Thailand) Sudket Prapakamol / Saralee Thungthongkam (withdrew)
7. (Poland) Robert Mateusiak / Nadieżda Zięba (quarterfinals)
8. (Indonesia) Muhammad Rijal / Debby Susanto (quarterfinals)

=== Top half ===
First Round
1	(China) Xu C (China) Ma J	21	21
(Indonesia) I Fadhilah (Indonesia) W Anggraini	10	15
(South Korea) Ko S-h (South Korea) Kim H-n	18	13
(Indonesia) M Kido (Indonesia) P Z Bernadet	21	21
7	(Poland) R Mateusiak (Poland) N Zięba	21	21
(Singapore) D B Chrisnanta (Singapore) V Neo	18	18
(India) T Kona (India) A Ponnappa	21	14	25
(Indonesia) P Jordan (Indonesia) V Marissa	18	21	23
3	(China) Zhang N (China) Zhao YL	21	21
Q3	(Indonesia) M F Gideon (Indonesia) A P L Variella	7	16
(Japan) K Hayakawa (Japan) M Matsutomo	20	16
(South Korea) Shin B-c (South Korea) Chang Y-n	22	21
PFQ	(Hong Kong) Chan Y L (Hong Kong) Tse Y S	5	21	15
(Indonesia) R Widianto (Indonesia) R P Dili	21	16	21
Q1	(Russia) V Ivanov (Russia) A Chervaikova	21	21
Q2	(Thailand) P Chalardchaleam (Thailand) J Kittiharakul	17	16

Second Round
1	(China) Xu C (China) Ma J	21	21
(Indonesia) M Kido (Indonesia) P Z Bernadet	10	10
7	(Poland) R Mateusiak (Poland) N Zięba	21	17	21
(India) T Kona (India) A Ponnappa	14	21	13
3	(China) Zhang N (China) Zhao YL	21	21
(South Korea) Shin B-c (South Korea) Chang Y-n	14	12
(Indonesia) R Widianto (Indonesia) R P Dili	23	21
Q1	(Russia) V Ivanov (Russia) A Chervaikova	21	18

Quarterfinals
1	(China) Xu C (China) Ma J	21	16	21
7	(Poland) R Mateusiak (Poland) N Zięba	11	21	18
3	(China) Zhang N (China) Zhao YL	21	21
(Indonesia) R Widianto (Indonesia) R P Dili	16	17

Semifinals
1	(China) Xu C (China) Ma J	15	17
3	(China) Zhang N (China) Zhao YL	21	21

=== Bottom half ===
First Round
(England) C Langridge (England) H Olver	21	14	23
(Denmark) A Kristiansen (Denmark) J Houmann	19	21	21
(Japan) T Kamura (Japan) K Yonemoto	20	15
8	(Indonesia) M Rijal (Indonesia) D Susanto	22	21
(England) C Adcock (England) G White	21	21
(Indonesia) L A Nugroho (Indonesia) A Saufika	12	14
(Hong Kong) Lee C H (Hong Kong) Chau H W	11	10
4	(Denmark) J Fischer Nielsen (Denmark) C Pedersen	21	21
Q4	(Japan) H Hashimoto (Japan) M Maeda	18	19
(South Korea) Yoo Y-s (South Korea) Eom H-w	21	21
(China) Qiu ZH (China) Bao YX	21	12	21
5	(Malaysia) Chan P S (Malaysia) Goh L Y	19	21	23
(Germany) M Fuchs (Germany) B Michels	24	16	11
(Indonesia) F Kurniawan (Indonesia) S P Irawati	22	21	21
(Denmark) M Pieler Kolding (Denmark) K Rytter Juhl	22	15	17
2	(Indonesia) T Ahmad (Indonesia) L Natsir	20	21	21

Second Round
(England) C Langridge (England) H Olver	14	13
8	(Indonesia) M Rijal (Indonesia) D Susanto	21	21
(England) C Adcock (England) G White	22	19	13
4	(Denmark) J Fischer Nielsen (Denmark) C Pedersen	20	21	21
(South Korea) Yoo Y-s (South Korea) Eom H-w	20	16
5	(Malaysia) Chan P S (Malaysia) Goh L Y	22	21
(Indonesia) F Kurniawan (Indonesia) S P Irawati	21	12	11
2	(Indonesia) T Ahmad (Indonesia) L Natsir	12	21	21

Quarterfinals
8	(Indonesia) M Rijal (Indonesia) D Susanto	17	19
4	(Denmark) J Fischer Nielsen (Denmark) C Pedersen	21	21
5	(Malaysia) Chan P S (Malaysia) Goh L Y	15	16
2	(Indonesia) T Ahmad (Indonesia) L Natsir	21	21

Semifinals
4	(Denmark) J Fischer Nielsen (Denmark) C Pedersen	21	21
2	(Indonesia) T Ahmad (Indonesia) L Natsir	15	14

=== Finals ===
Semifinals
1	(China) Xu Chen (China) Ma Jin	15	17
3	(China) Zhang Nan (China) Zhao Yunlei	21	21
4	(Denmark) Joachim Fischer Nielsen (Denmark) Christinna Pedersen	21	21
2	(Indonesia) Tantowi Ahmad (Indonesia) Lilyana Natsir	15	14

Final
3	(China) Zhang Nan (China) Zhao Yunlei	24	20	21
4	(Denmark) Joachim Fischer Nielsen (Denmark) Christinna Pedersen	22	22	12

Preceded by 2012 Indonesia Super Series	Indonesia Super Series	Succeeded by 2014 Indonesia Super Series
Preceded by 2013 India Super Series	BWF Super Series; 2013 season	Succeeded by 2013 Singapore Super Series
