= Agus Dwi Santoso =

Personal information
- Born: July 26, 1965 (age 61) Malang, Indonesia

Sport
- Country: Indonesia
- Sport: Badminton
- Handedness: Right
- Event: Men's & Women’s Singles

Agus Dwi Santoso (born in Malang, July 26, 1965) is a badminton coach from Indonesia who is specialized in coaching Men's and Women's Singles. From 1998 to 2003, Agus Dwi Santoso occupied the National Training Center of Indonesia and coached the men's singles team. In 2010 Santoso was once again hired as Indonesia's men's singles coach at the Pelatnas PB PBSI Cipayung Training Centre. In between his stints for the National association he was a clubtrainer for PB Djarum Kudus, where he managed to make a few clubathletes brilliant. Among them are Andre Kurniawan Tedjono, Dionysius Hayom Rumbaka and Riyanto Subagja, who under his guidance were able to beat several international top players. Other players who coached under Santoso in the past are also Indonesian two-time World Championships medalist (silver–2007, bronze–2009) Sony Dwi Kuncoro and All England finalist Budi Santoso.

== International coaching career ==
Agus Dwi Santoso had been in charge of the men's singles for the Indonesian Badminton Association (PBSI), before embarking on his international coaching career with a position in Vietnam. He then served as a singles coach in South Korea in 2016 before joining the Thailand national team. When he served as the singles coach in South Korea Son Wan-ho became the world no. 1 during this period. In Thailand Agus Dwi Santoso teamed up with Indonesian compatriots Mulyo Handoyo and Rexy Mainaky, who held coaching positions with the Thai association since 2017. In Thailand Santoso was instrumental in Kantaphon Wangcharoen becoming the first Thai player to win a World Championship medal in the men's singles event. Agus served as a singles coach in Thailand from December 2018 to February 2020.

He has been instrumental in honing the skills of world-class shuttlers such as Son Wan-ho and Sung Ji-hyun in South Korea and Thailand's Busanan Ongbamrungphan. Santoso is also credited to have guided Indonesian player Hendrawan to an Olympic silver and world championship gold in 2000 and 2001. He was joining Indian badminton at a time when the performance of the top Indian singles players, including P.V. Sindhu, Saina Nehwal and Kidambi Srikanth had dipped immensely.

Santoso was hired as India's new badminton singles coach after the unceremonious exit of coach Kim Ji Hyun of South Korea. Kim left India abruptly in September 2019 after guiding P.V.Sindhu to an unprecedented 2019 World Championships gold medal. At the time Agus started coaching in India South Korea's Park Tae-sang was tasked with the responsibility of guiding Sindhu along with the men's singles' players at the Gopichand Badminton Academy in Hyderabad. Foreign coaches, who have served Indian badminton in the recent past, include Malaysian doubles specialist Tan Kim Her, experienced Indonesian singles coach Mulyo Handoyo, who was responsible for Srikanth's rise in 2017; and South Korea's Kim Ji Hyun. Along with coach Park Tae Sang, coach Santoso is in charge of India's singles squad while coaches Dwi Kristian and Namrih Suroto are taking care of the India's doubles disciplines.

Although coach Santoso started with a new Olympic mission in India, due to the COVID-19 pandemic and lockdown his first four months in India were very frustrating. He was forced to stay indoors for nearly four months on his arrival in Hyderabad in March 2020, before the State government allowed the resumption of training at the academies in August 2020. However, the Badminton Association of India (BAI) was cautious in their approach when they announced a camp for only eight Olympic hopefuls at the SAI (Sports Authority of India) – Pullela Gopichand Academy. Out of the eight, only four players P. V. Sindhu, B. Sai Praneeth, Sikki Reddy and later on Kidambi Srikanth joined the camp. Agus Dwi Santoso is leading the Olympic-bound Indian singles players after the coronavirus outbreak disrupted the sporting world resulting in cancellation or postponement of a number of tournaments.

== Personal life ==
Born in Malang, East Java, Agus Dwi Santoso is married.
