= Zhou Hui (badminton) =

Chinese badminton player (born 1989)

Zhou Hui 周卉
Personal information
- Born: 1989 (age 36–37) Lin'an, Zhejiang, China
- Height: 1.80 m (5 ft 11 in)

Sport
- Country: China
- Sport: Badminton
- Retired: 2014

Women's singles
- Highest ranking: 33 (3 March 2011)
- BWF profile
Medal record
Women's badminton
Representing China
East Asian Games
Gold medal – first place	2009 Hong Kong	Women's team

Zhou Hui (Chinese: 周卉; born 1989) is a Chinese badminton player. Born in Lin'an City, Zhou joined the Zhejiang Province badminton team in 2000, and she was chosen to join the national junior team in 2005. She competed at the 2009 East Asian Games in Hong Kong, and won gold for the women's team event. She won her first international individual title at the 2010 India Grand Prix tournament. Zhou retired from the international competitions in 2014, and later works as coach and teacher in Zhejiang Gongshang University.

== Achievements ==
=== BWF Grand Prix ===
The BWF Grand Prix had two levels, the BWF Grand Prix and Grand Prix Gold. It was a series of badminton tournaments sanctioned by the Badminton World Federation (BWF) which was held from 2007 to 2017.

Women's singles

Year	Tournament	Opponent	Score	Result
2010	Vietnam Open	(Thailand) Ratchanok Intanon	17–21, 20–22	(silver) Runner-up
2010	India Grand Prix	(Indonesia) Fransisca Ratnasari	21–13, 21–17	(gold) Winner

BWF Grand Prix Gold tournament
BWF Grand Prix tournament
