= Fransisca Ratnasari =

Indonesian badminton player

Personal information
- Nickname: Nana
- Born: Fransisca Ratnasari Hari Saputra; 2 October 1986 (age 40) Sleman, Yogyakarta SR, Indonesia
- Height: 1.67 m (5 ft 6 in)
- Weight: 55 kg (121 lb)

Sport
- Country: Indonesia
- Sport: Badminton
- Handedness: Right
- Coached by: Marleve Mainaky

Women's singles
- Highest ranking: 28 (22 July 2010)
- BWF profile
Medal record
Women's badminton
Representing Indonesia
Sudirman Cup
Silver medal – second place	2005 Beijing	Mixed team
Uber Cup
Silver medal – second place	2008 Jakarta	Women's team
SEA Games
Bronze medal – third place	2003 Vietnam	Women's team
Bronze medal – third place	2005 Manila	Women's team
Summer Universiade
Bronze medal – third place	2007 Bangkok	Mixed team
World Junior Championships
Bronze medal – third place	2004 Richmond	Mixed team
Asian Junior Championships
Bronze medal – third place	2004 Hwacheon	Girls' team

Fransisca Ratnasari Hari Saputra (born 2 October 1986) is an Indonesian retired badminton player.

== Personal life ==
Fransisca Ratnasari Hari Saputra was born as the youngest daughter of four children of Petrus Haryanto and M. Kasiyem family. She went to Caritas Nandan Catholic Elementary School until she graduated in 1997. She then continue her education in SMPN 5 (Number 5 National Junior High School) of Yogyakarta but only lasted for 2 months because she decided to focus on her badminton career. She is now still registered as a student in STIE (School of Economics) PERBANAS Jakarta. After retired from the badminton, she continued studying at the Sanata Dharma University majoring in English literature.

== Career ==
"Nana", as people called her, started playing badminton at 8 years old. She went to Jaya Raya Jakarta club at 13 years old. In 2003, she was selected for the Indonesia national badminton team and in 2004, she was part of the Indonesian Uber Cup squad. At the Indonesia Open, Nana defeated Pi Hongyan from France in the 3rd round. At the Japan Open, Nana advanced to the quarterfinals. At the 2005 Sudirman Cup, Nana helped the Indonesian team to reach the final round after she defeated Camilla Sørensen from Denmark.

At the 2006 Asian Games, Nana beat Thillini Jayasinghe on the round of 32. But she lost to China's famous Zhang Ning in the round of 16. In 2007, she competed at the 2007 Summer Universiade in Bangkok, Thailand. At the 2008 Uber Cup, Nana was Indonesia's fourth women's singles player and was kept out of the matches. The Indonesian team reached the final but was defeated by China. In early January 2009, Nana had been dropped out from the national training center due to the reformization of PBSI under new chairman. She then moved to new club PB Djarum and play under Djarum name.

== Achievements ==
=== ASEAN University Games ===
Women's singles
Year	Venue	Opponent	Score	Result	Ref.
2008	Kuala Lumpur Badminton Stadium; Kuala Lumpur, Malaysia	(Malaysia) Julia Wong Pei Xian	21–19, 10–21, 15–21	Silver	

=== BWF Grand Prix (1 title, 2 runners-up) ===
The BWF Grand Prix had two levels, the Grand Prix and Grand Prix Gold. It was a series of badminton tournaments sanctioned by the Badminton World Federation (BWF) and played between 2007 and 2017. The World Badminton Grand Prix was sanctioned by the International Badminton Federation from 1983 to 2006.

Women's singles
Year	Tournament	Opponent	Score	Result
2005	New Zealand Open	(Indonesia) Adriyanti Firdasari	8–11, 5–11	(silver) Runner-up
2009	Vietnam Open	(Chinese Taipei) Tai Tzu-ying	21–19, 15–21, 21–13	(gold) Winner
2010	India Grand Prix	(China) Zhou Hui	13–21, 17–21	(silver) Runner-up

BWF Grand Prix Gold tournament
BWF Grand Prix tournament

=== BWF International Challenge/Series (3 titles, 3 runners-up) ===
Women's singles
Year	Tournament	Opponent	Score	Result
2005	Jakarta Satellite	(Indonesia) Maria Kristin Yulianti	11–2, 5–11, 2–11	(silver) Runner-up
2009	Indonesia International	(Indonesia) Maria Elfira Christina	21–12, 21–9	(gold) Winner
2010	Austrian International	(Bulgaria) Petya Nedelcheva	21–15, 18–21, 21–14	(gold) Winner
2010	Tata Open India International	(India) P. C. Thulasi	15–21, 13–21	(silver) Runner-up
2011	White Nights	(Indonesia) Maria Kristin Yulianti	21–15, 21–23, 21–11	(gold) Winner
2011	Indonesia International	(India) P. V. Sindhu	16–21, 11–21	(silver) Runner-up

BWF International Challenge tournament
BWF International Series tournament
