= Fauzi Adnan =

Indonesian badminton player (born 1987)

Personal information
- Born: 3 June 1987 (age 39) Klaten, Central Java, Indonesia

Sport
- Country: Indonesia
- Sport: Badminton
- Handedness: Right
- Event: Men's singles & doubles

Men's singles & doubles
- BWF profile
Medal record
Men's badminton
Representing Indonesia
Asian Junior Championships
Bronze medal – third place	2005 Jakarta	Boys' singles
Bronze medal – third place	2005 Jakarta	Boys' team

Fauzi Adnan (born 3 June 1987) is an Indonesian badminton player. Born in Klaten, Central Java, he trained at the Suryanaga Surabaya club. He was the bronze medalists at the 2005 Asian Junior Championships in the boys' singles and team event. Teamed-up with Trikusuma Wardhana in the men's doubles, they claimed the Grand Prix title at the 2009 India Open Grand Prix. In the singles event, he was the finalists at the 2009 Indonesia and Singapore International tournaments.

== Achievements ==
=== Asian Junior Championships ===
Boys' singles
Year	Venue	Opponent	Score	Result
2005	Tennis Indoor Senayan; Jakarta, Indonesia	(China) Lu Qicheng	7–15, 15–8, 5–15	Bronze

=== BWF Grand Prix ===
The BWF Grand Prix had two levels, the BWF Grand Prix and Grand Prix Gold. It was a series of badminton tournaments sanctioned by the Badminton World Federation (BWF) which was held from 2007 to 2017.

Men's doubles
Year	Tournament	Partner	Opponent	Score	Result	Ref.
2009	India Grand Prix	(Indonesia) Trikusuma Wardhana	(India) Akshay Dewalkar (India) Jishnu Sanyal	27–25, 23–25, 21–15	(gold) Winner	

BWF Grand Prix Gold tournament
BWF Grand Prix tournament

=== BWF International Challenge/Series (2 runners-up) ===
Men's singles
Year	Tournament	Opponent	Score	Result	Ref.
2009	Indonesia International	(Indonesia) Dionysius Hayom Rumbaka	14–21, 6–11 retired	(silver) Runner-up	
2009	Singapore International	(South Korea) Shon Seung-mo	9–21, 12–21	(silver) Runner-up	

BWF International Challenge tournament
BWF International Series tournament
