= Dionysius Hayom Rumbaka =

Indonesian badminton player (born 1988)

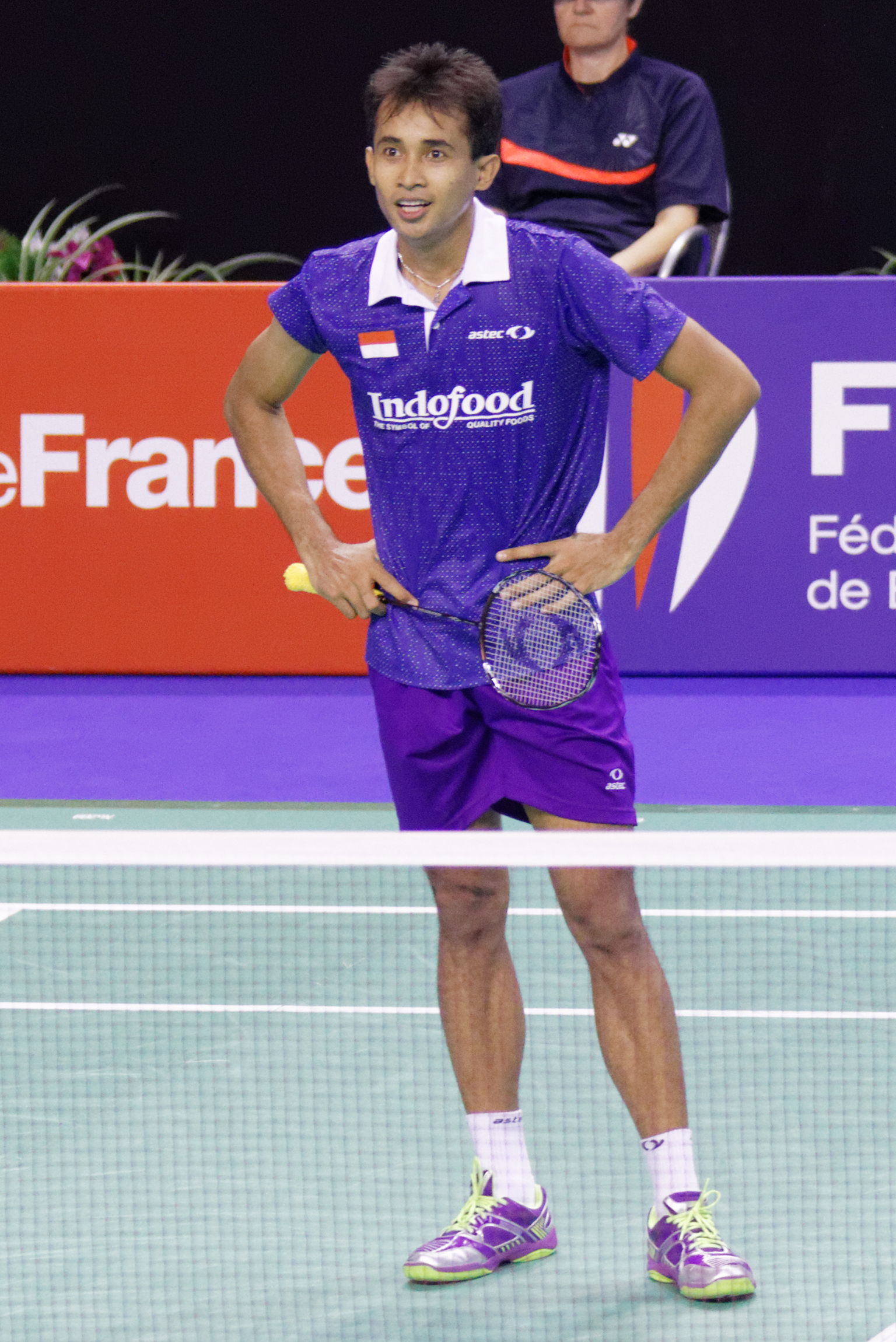

Personal information
- Born: 22 October 1988 (age 38) Kulon Progo, Yogyakarta, Indonesia
- Height: 1.82 m (6 ft 0 in)
- Weight: 73 kg (161 lb)

Sport
- Country: Indonesia
- Sport: Badminton
- Handedness: Right
- Coached by: Agus Dwi Santoso
- Retired: 2018

Men's singles
- Highest ranking: 17 (17 April 2014)
- BWF profile
Medal record
Men's badminton
Representing Indonesia
Sudirman Cup
Bronze medal – third place	2011 Qingdao	Mixed team
Thomas Cup
Silver medal – second place	2010 Kuala Lumpur	Men's team
Bronze medal – third place	2014 New Delhi	Men's team
Asian Games
Bronze medal – third place	2010 Guangzhou	Men's team
SEA Games
Gold medal – first place	2011 Jakarta-Palembang	Men's team
Silver medal – second place	2013 Naypyidaw	Men's singles

Dionysius Hayom Rumbaka (born 22 October 1988) is a retired Indonesian badminton player. He is a men's singles specialist from PB. Djarum, a badminton club in Kudus, Central Java and has joined the club since 2005. He retired in 2018 due to long injury and started his coaching career with the PB Djarum youth team.

== Achievements ==
=== SEA Games ===
Men's singles
Year	Venue	Opponent	Score	Result	Ref.
2013	Wunna Theikdi Indoor Stadium; Naypyidaw, Myanmar	(Thailand) Tanongsak Saensomboonsuk	20–22, 17–21	Silver	

=== BWF Grand Prix (4 titles, 5 runners-up) ===
The BWF Grand Prix had two levels, the BWF Grand Prix and Grand Prix Gold. It was a series of badminton tournaments sanctioned by the Badminton World Federation (BWF) which was held from 2007 to 2017.

Men's singles
Year	Tournament	Opponent	Score	Result	Ref.
2009	Australian Open	(Indonesia) Alamsyah Yunus	21–17, 21–18	(gold) Winner	
2009	India Grand Prix	(India) Anand Chetan	17–21, 21–19, 16–21	(silver) Runner-up	
2010	Indonesia Grand Prix Gold	(Indonesia) Taufik Hidayat	28–26, 17–21, 14–21	(silver) Runner-up	
2010	India Grand Prix	(Thailand) Suppanyu Avihingsanon	14–21, 21–15, 21–12	(gold) Winner	
2011	Indonesia Grand Prix Gold	(Indonesia) Tommy Sugiarto	21–16, 21–17	(gold) Winner	
2012	Indonesia Grand Prix Gold	(Indonesia) Sony Dwi Kuncoro	11–21, 11–21	(silver) Runner-up	
2013	Indonesia Grand Prix Gold	(Indonesia) Simon Santoso	17–21, 11–21	(silver) Runner-up	
2014	Vietnam Open	(India) Prannoy H. S.	18–21, 21–15, 21–18	(gold) Winner	
2015	German Open	(Denmark) Jan Ø. Jørgensen	12–21, 13–21	(silver) Runner-up	

Grand Prix Gold tournament
Grand Prix tournament

=== BWF International Challenge/Series (2 titles, 2 runners-up) ===
Men's singles
Year	Tournament	Opponent	Score	Result	Ref.
2009	Banuinvest International	(Indonesia) Bandar Sigit Pamungkas	16–21, 21–14, 21–12	(gold) Winner	
2009	Vietnam International	(Vietnam) Nguyễn Tiến Minh	13–21, 15–21	(silver) Runner-up	
2009	Indonesia International	(Indonesia) Fauzi Adnan	21–14, 11–6 retired	(gold) Winner	
2017	Indonesia International	(Indonesia) Shesar Hiren Rhustavito	4–11 retired	(silver) Runner-up	

BWF International Challenge tournament
BWF International Series tournament
BWF Future Series tournament

== Performance timeline ==
=== National team ===
- Senior level

Team event	2011
SEA Games	Gold

Team event	2010
Asian Games	Bronze

Team event	2010	2014
Thomas Cup	Silver	Bronze

Team event	2011
Sudirman Cup	Bronze

=== Individual competitions ===
- Senior level

Event	2013
SEA Games	Silver

Events	2010	2011	2012	2013	2014	2015
Asia Championships	R2	A	R3	A		R3
World Championships	A	R1	—N/a	R2	A	R2

Tournament	2018	Best
BWF World Tour
Thailand Masters	R1	R1 (2018)
Year-end Ranking	506	17

Tournament	2009	2010	2011	2012	2013	2014	2015	Best
BWF Superseries
All England Open	A	R1	R2	QF	R1	R2	R2	QF (2012)
Swiss Open	A	R2	GPG					R2 (2010)
India Open	GPG		R1	R1	R2	R2	A	R2 (2013, 2014)
Malaysia Open	A		R1	R2	A	R1	R2	R2 (2012, 2015)
Singapore Open	A	R2	R1	QF	A	R2	R2	QF (2012)
Indonesia Open	A	R1	R1	QF	SF	R1	R2	SF (2013)
China Masters	A	R2	A		R1	GPG		R2 (2010)
Korea Open	A		R1	R1	A	R2	R1	R2 (2014)
Japan Open	A	R1	R2	A	R1	A	R2	R2 (2011, 2015)
Denmark Open	A		R1	R1	R1	R2	R2	R2 (2014, 2015)
French Open	A			R1	QF	A	R1	QF (2013)
China Open	A		R1	A				R1 (2011)
Hong Kong Open	QF	R1	A	R1	A			QF (2009)
Year-end Ranking	30	19	30	25	22	30	22	17
Tournament	2009	2010	2011	2012	2013	2014	2015	Best

Tournament	2007	2008	2009	2010	2011	2012	2013	2014	2015	2016	2017	Best
BWF Grand Prix and Grand Prix Gold
Malaysia Masters	—N/a		A		R1	A	w/d	A	R1	A	R1	R1 (2011, 2015, 2017)
Syed Modi International	—N/a		F	W	R3	A	—N/a	A				W (2010)
German Open	A					R3	A	R1	F	A		F (2015)
Swiss Open	SS				w/d	A	R3	A				R3 (2013)
Australian Open	IS		W	A				SS				W (2009)
New Zealand Open	A		R2	—N/a	IC	—N/a	A		R3	A	R1	R3 (2015)
Thailand Open	R1	A		—N/a	A		R2	—N/a	SF	A		SF (2015)
Philippines Open	R1	—N/a	A	—N/a								R1 (2007)
Chinese Taipei Open	A		QF	SF	R1	w/d	A		R3	A		SF (2010)
Bitburger Open	A	R2	A						R3	A		R3 (2015)
Bulgaria Open	—N/a	R3	—N/a			IS				FS		R3 (2008)
Dutch Open	A	R3	A					QF	A			QF (2014)
Russian Open	R3	A										R3 (2007)
Vietnam Open	R2	R3	R3	A		SF	A	W	A		R1	W (2014)
Korea Masters	IC			A	R2	A						R2 (2011)
Macau Open	R2	A		R3	R3	R3	A				R2	R3 (2010, 2011, 2012)
Indonesian Masters	—N/a			F	W	F	F	R3	w/d	A	—N/a	W (2011)
Year-end Ranking			30	19	30	25	22	30	22	—N/a	226	17
Tournament	2007	2008	2009	2010	2011	2012	2013	2014	2015	2016	2017	Best

== Record against selected opponents ==
Head to head (H2H) against Superseries finalists, Worlds Semi-finalists, and Olympic quarterfinalists.

- (China) Bao Chunlai 0–2
- (China) Chen Jin 0–4
- (China) Chen Long 0–4
- (China) Chen Yu 0–1
- (China) Du Pengyu 3–0
- (China) Lin Dan 0–1
- (China) Tian Houwei 0–1
- (China) Wang Zhengming 1–2
- (China) Xue Song 1–0
- (Denmark) Hans-Kristian Vittinghus 1–3
- (Denmark) Jan Ø. Jørgensen 0–7
- (Denmark) Peter Gade 0–1
- (Denmark) Viktor Axelsen 1–0
- (Germany) Marc Zwiebler 0–3
- (Hong Kong) Hu Yun 1–3
- (Indonesia) Simon Santoso 1–3
- (Indonesia) Sony Dwi Kuncoro 1–1
- (Indonesia) Taufik Hidayat 0–2
- (Indonesia) Tommy Sugiarto 4–1
- (India) Ajay Jayaram 2–3
- (India) Prannoy H. S. 1–0
- (India) Parupalli Kashyap 2–2
- (Japan) Sho Sasaki 2–3
- (Japan) Takuma Ueda 2–2
- (South Korea) Lee Dong-keun 1–0
- (South Korea) Lee Hyun-il 0–1
- (South Korea) Son Wan-ho 1–4
- (Malaysia) Lee Chong Wei 0–6
- (Malaysia) Liew Daren 3–2
- (Malaysia) Muhammad Hafiz Hashim 1–2
- (Thailand) Boonsak Ponsana 1–3
- (Thailand) Tanongsak Saensomboonsuk 1–0
- (Chinese Taipei) Chou Tien-chen 1–1
- (Vietnam) Nguyễn Tiến Minh 2–2
