= Aditi Mutatkar =

Indian badminton player

Personal information
- Born: 6 October 1987 (age 39) Gwalior, Madhya Pradesh, India
- Height: 1.60 m (5 ft 3 in)

Sport
- Country: India
- Sport: Badminton
- Handedness: Right

Women's singles & doubles
- Highest ranking: 27 (June, 2010)
- BWF profile
Medal record
Women's badminton
Representing India
Commonwealth Games
Silver medal – second place	2010 Delhi	Mixed team
Asian Junior Championships
Bronze medal – third place	2002 Kuala Lumpur	Girls' team

Aditi Mutatkar (born 6 October 1987) is an Indian badminton player from Pune, Maharashtra. She won the silver medal in Mixed team event in 2010 Commonwealth Games held in Delhi, 2010. She reached her highest rank of 27th in the world when she registered her career-best performance of reaching the finals of the Bitburger Open. In the domestic circuit, she has won the Badminton Nationals in all age categories, only the third woman in this country to do so.

Aditi's career has been riddled with injuries. After a one and a half year hiatus due to injury, in 2012–13, she has made a strong comeback with a third-place finish in the senior nationals and victory at the State Championships.

== Career titles and runners-up ==
=== BWF Grand Prix ===
The BWF Grand Prix has two level such as Grand Prix and Grand Prix Gold. It is a series of badminton tournaments, sanctioned by Badminton World Federation (BWF) since 2007.

Women's singles
Year	Tournament	Opponent	Score	Result
2009	India Grand Prix	(India) Saina Nehwal	17–21, 13–21	(silver) Runner-up
2008	Bitburger Open	(Indonesia) Maria Febe Kusumastuti	24–22, 8–21, 21–23	(silver) Runner-up

BWF Grand Prix Gold tournament
BWF Grand Prix tournament

== Career overview ==
Career Summary

- Winner of 5 National Badminton Championships (under 13, under 16, under 19 and Senior Nationals) (Only the third woman in India to have achieved this)
- Represented the Indian Badminton team in multiple International tournaments
- Winner of silver and bronze medals on multiple occasions in International Championships
- Highest ranking achieved was 27th during 2008 – 2009
- Second Indian woman to have played a Grand Prix final in 2008 (after Saina Nehwal)

Domestic Achievements

- Mini National Champion (under 13) at Mandya in 2000
- Gold medalist in Schools National Game at Bharuch in 2000
- Sub Junior National Champion (under 16) at Patna in 2002
- Junior National Champion (under 19) at Panchkula in 2006
- Senior National Ranking Tournament winner in Mumbai (2006), Indore (2006) and Bangalore (2007)
- Silver medalist in National Games at Guwahati in 2008
- Senior National Champion at Rohtak in 2011
- Semi Finalist at Senior Nationals held in Pune in 2013
- State Champion at Mumbai in 2013
- Winner of the team event at Inter PSPB badminton tournament in 2013

International Achievements

- Semi-finalist in French Junior Open Championship in 2001
- Semi-finalist in Yonex Sunrise Singapore Junior Championship in 2001
- Bronze medalist in Junior Asian Badminton Championship in Malaysia in 2002
- Runner up in Bitburger Open Grand Prix event in Germany in October 2008
- Semi-finalist in Bulgarian Open Grand Prix event in October 2008
- Semi-finalist in Dutch Open Grand Prix event in October 2008
- Runner-up in Indian International Grand Prix in Lucknow in 2009
- Quarter Finalist in Asian Badminton Championship in New Delhi in April 2010
- Silver Medalist in Mixed Team Event representing Indian Badminton Team for Commonwealth Games in New Delhi in Oct 2010
