= Trikusuma Wardhana =

Indonesian badminton player

Personal information
- Born: 20 November 1988 (age 37) Ujung Pandang, South Sulawesi, Indonesia

Sport
- Country: Indonesia
- Sport: Badminton

Men's & mixed doubles
- Highest ranking: 41 (MD 24 October 2013); 63(XD 2 December 2010)
- BWF profile

Trikusuma Wardhana (born 20 November 1988) is an Indonesian badminton player who affiliate with Exist Jakarta club.

== Career ==
Wardhana comes from East Java regional training center, and also trained at the Jaya Raya Suryanaga badminton club in Surabaya. In 2009, he failed to join Indonesia national badminton team. In December 2009, he became the champion at the India Grand Prix tournament in men's doubles event partnered with Fauzi Adnan after beat Indian pair Akshay Dewalkar and Jishnu Sanyal. In 2013, he also won the Croatian International tournament in men's doubles event partnered with Christopher Rusdianto.

== Achievements ==
=== BWF Grand Prix ===
The BWF Grand Prix had two levels, the BWF Grand Prix and Grand Prix Gold. It was a series of badminton tournaments sanctioned by the Badminton World Federation (BWF) which was held from 2007 to 2017.

Men's doubles
Year	Tournament	Partner	Opponent	Score	Result
2009	India Grand Prix	(Indonesia) Fauzi Adnan	(India) Akshay Dewalkar (India) Jishnu Sanyal	27–25, 23–25, 21–15	(gold) Winner

BWF Grand Prix Gold tournament
BWF Grand Prix tournament

=== BWF International Challenge/Series ===
Men's doubles
Year	Tournament	Partner	Opponent	Score	Result
2011	Smiling Fish International	(Indonesia) Hendra Setyo Nugrorho	(Malaysia) Nelson Heg Wei Keat (Malaysia) Teo Ee Yi	21–15, 19–21 16–21	(silver) Runner-up
2013	Croatian International	(Indonesia) Christopher Rusdianto	(Croatia) Zvonimir Durkinjak (Croatia) Zvonimir Hoelbling	21–14, 22–20	(gold) Winner
2013	Polish International	(Indonesia) Christopher Rusdianto	(Chinese Taipei) Chen Chung-jen (Chinese Taipei) Wang Chi-lin	24–22, 14–21, 14–21	(silver) Runner-up

Mixed doubles
Year	Tournament	Partner	Opponent	Score	Result
2010	Indonesia International	(Indonesia) Nadya Melati	(Indonesia) Hendra Mulyono (Indonesia) Ayu Rahmasari	18–21, 21–14, 18–21	(silver) Runner-up
2012	Indonesia International	(Indonesia) Aprilsasi Putri Lejarsar Variella	(South Korea) Lee Jae-jin (South Korea) Yoo Hyun-young	21–19, 13–21, 12–21	(silver) Runner-up

BWF International Challenge tournament
BWF International Series tournament
BWF Future Series tournament
