= Akshay Dewalkar =

Indian badminton player (born 1988)

Personal information
- Born: 2 July 1988 (age 38) Mumbai, India
- Height: 1.74 m (5 ft 9 in)
- Weight: 74 kg (163 lb)

Sport
- Country: India
- Sport: Badminton
- Handedness: Right

Men's & mixed doubles
- Highest ranking: 28 (MD 21 July 2016); 57 (XD 23 April 2015)
- BWF profile
Medal record
Men's badminton
Representing India
Asia Team Championships
Bronze medal – third place	2016 Hyderabad	Men's team
South Asian Games
Gold medal – first place	2006 Colombo	Men's team
Gold medal – first place	2016 Guwahati–Shillong	Men's team
Silver medal – second place	2016 Guwahati–Shillong	Men's doubles
Bronze medal – third place	2006 Colombo	Men's doubles

Akshay Dewalkar (born 2 July 1988) is an Indian badminton player. He was the men's doubles National Champion together with Pranav Chopra in 2013 and 2015. Dewalkar was the men's team gold medalists at the 2006 and 2016 South Asian Games, also won a men's doubles silver in 2016 with Chopra and a bronze in 2006 with Jishnu Sanyal. He participated at the 2010, 2014 Asian Games and 2014 Commonwealth Games

== Personal life ==
Dewalkar announced his engagement with Mridu Sharma, the psychologist appointed by Sports Authority of India at the Gopichand Academy in 2017.

== Achievements ==
=== South Asian Games ===
Men's doubles
Year	Venue	Partner	Opponent	Score	Result
2006	Sugathadasa Indoor Stadium; Colombo, Sri Lanka	(India) Jishnu Sanyal	(Sri Lanka) Thushara Edirisinghe (Sri Lanka) Duminda Jayakody	13–21, 21–16, 16–21	Bronze
2016	Multipurpose Hall SAI–SAG Centre; Shillong, India	(India) Pranav Chopra	(India) Manu Attri (India) B. Sumeeth Reddy	18–21, 17–21	Silver

=== BWF Grand Prix (2 runners-up) ===
The BWF Grand Prix had two levels, the BWF Grand Prix and Grand Prix Gold. It was a series of badminton tournaments sanctioned by the Badminton World Federation (BWF) which was held from 2007 to 2017.

Men's doubles
Year	Tournament	Partner	Opponent	Score	Result
2009	India Grand Prix	(India) Jishnu Sanyal	(Indonesia) Fauzi Adnan (Indonesia) Tri Kusumawardana	25–27, 25–23, 15–21	(silver) Runner-up
2016	Syed Modi International	(India) Pranav Chopra	(Malaysia) Goh V Shem (Malaysia) Tan Wee Kiong	21–14, 22–24, 8–21	(silver) Runner-up

BWF Grand Prix Gold tournament
BWF Grand Prix tournament

=== BWF International Challenge/Series (6 titles, 6 runners-up) ===
Men's doubles
Year	Tournament	Partner	Opponent	Score	Result
2008	Nepal International	(India) V. Diju	(Pakistan) Mohammad Attique (Pakistan) Rizwan Azam	19–21, 21–10, 21–12	(gold) Winner
2008	Bahrain International	(India) Jishnu Sanyal	(Iran) Mohammed Reza Kheradmandi (Iran) Ali Shahhosseini	14–21, 21–18, 21–11	(gold) Winner
2010	Tata Open India International	(India) Arun Vishnu	(Indonesia) Joko Riyadi (Indonesia) Yoga Ukikasah	22–24, 16–21	(silver) Runner-up
2011	Swiss International	(India) Pranav Chopra	(Poland) Łukasz Moreń (Poland) Wojciech Szkudlarczyk	21–17, 16–21, 12–21	(silver) Runner-up
2011	Tata Open India International	(India) Pranav Chopra	(India) Rupesh Kumar K. T. (India) Sanave Thomas	19–21, 21–17, 23–21	(gold) Winner
2015	Bangladesh International	(India) Pranav Chopra	(Malaysia) Tan Chee Tean (Malaysia) Tan Wee Gieen	21–16, 21–16	(gold) Winner
2015	Tata Open India International	(India) Pranav Chopra	(Thailand) Wannawat Ampunsuwan (Thailand) Tinn Isriyanet	14–21, 9–21	(silver) Runner-up
2016	Norwegian International	(India) Tarun Kona	(New Zealand) Oliver Leydon-Davis (Denmark) Lasse Mølhede	18–21, 20–22	(silver) Runner-up

Mixed doubles
Year	Tournament	Partner	Opponent	Score	Result
2013	Tata Open India International	(India) Pradnya Gadre	(India) Tarun Kona (India) Ashwini Ponnappa	21–17, 18–21, 21–18	(gold) Winner
2014	Sri Lanka International	(India) Pradnya Gadre	(Malaysia) Vountus Indra Mawan (India) Prajakta Sawant	21–16, 21–18	(gold) Winner
2014	Tata Open India International	(India) Pradnya Gadre	(India) Manu Attri (India) N. Sikki Reddy	19–21, 21–19, 10–21	(silver) Runner-up
2015	Polish Open	(India) Pradnya Gadre	(Malaysia) Chan Peng Soon (Malaysia) Goh Liu Ying	26–28, 18–21	(silver) Runner-up

BWF International Challenge tournament
BWF International Series tournament
BWF Future Series tournament
