= Tarun Kona =

Indian badminton player

Personal information
- Born: 17 November 1989 (age 36) Hyderabad, India
- Years active: 2006
- Height: 1.65 m (5 ft 5 in)

Sport
- Country: India
- Sport: Badminton
- Handedness: Right

Men's & mixed doubles
- Highest ranking: 37 (MD 23 May 2013); 26 (XD 25 April 2013)
- BWF profile

Tarun Kona (born 17 November 1989) is an Indian badminton player. He entered the national team in 2006, and in 2011, he won the men's doubles title at the National Championships.

== Achievements ==
=== BWF Grand Prix (1 runner-up) ===
The BWF Grand Prix had two levels, the BWF Grand Prix and Grand Prix Gold. It was a series of badminton tournaments sanctioned by the Badminton World Federation (BWF) which was held from 2007 to 2017.

Mixed doubles
Year	Tournament	Partner	Opponent	Score	Result
2009	India Grand Prix	(India) Shruti Kurien	(India) Arun Vishnu (India) Aparna Balan	14–21, 21–17, 19–21	(silver) Runner-up

BWF Grand Prix Gold tournament
BWF Grand Prix tournament

=== BWF International Challenge/Series (12 titles, 12 runners-up) ===
Men's doubles
Year	Tournament	Partner	Opponent	Score	Result
2011	Bangladesh International	(India) Arun Vishnu	(Vietnam) Bùi Bằng Đức (Vietnam) Đào Mạnh Thắng	21–7, 22–20	(gold) Winner
2012	Iran Fajr International	(India) Arun Vishnu	(Indonesia) Marcus Fernaldi Gideon (Indonesia) Agripina Prima Rahmanto Putra	18–21, 18–21	(silver) Runner-up
2016	Guatemala International	(India) Alwin Francis	(Mexico) Job Castillo (Mexico) Lino Muñoz	21–8, 21–14	(gold) Winner
2016	Peru International Series	(India) Alwin Francis	(Mexico) Job Castillo (Mexico) Lino Muñoz	21–8, 21–12	(gold) Winner
2016	Brazil International	(India) Alwin Francis	(Poland) Adam Cwalina (Poland) Przemysław Wacha	15–21, 16–21	(silver) Runner-up
2016	Jamaica International	(India) Alwin Francis	(Belgium) Matijs Dierickx (Belgium) Freek Golinski	19–21, Retired	(silver) Runner-up
2016	Norwegian International	(India) Akshay Dewalkar	(New Zealand) Oliver Leydon-Davis (Denmark) Lasse Mølhede	18–21, 20–22	(silver) Runner-up
2016	Botswana International	(India) Alwin Francis	(Mauritius) Aatish Lubah (Mauritius) Julien Paul	21–12, 21–19	(gold) Winner
2017	Uganda International	(India) Alwin Francis	(Mauritius) Aatish Lubah (Mauritius) Julien Paul	21–8, 21–14	(gold) Winner
2017	Peru International	(India) Alwin Francis	(Peru) Mario Cuba (Peru) Diego Mini	21–15, 21–15	(gold) Winner
2017	Kharkiv International	(India) Alwin Francis	(India) K. Nandagopal (India) Rohan Kapoor	21–18, 22–24, 18–21	(silver) Runner-up
2017	South Africa International	(India) Saurabh Sharma	(Mauritius) Aatish Lubah (Mauritius) Julien Paul	21–9, 21–15	(gold) Winner
2018	Iran Fajr International	(India) Saurabh Sharma	(India) Alwin Francis (India) K. Nandagopal	11–9, 6–11, 11–7, 8–11, 9–11	(silver) Runner-up
2018	Jamaica International	(India) Saurabh Sharma	(Jamaica) Gareth Henry (Jamaica) Samuel Ricketts	21–17, 21–17	(gold) Winner
2018	Brazil International	(India) Saurabh Sharma	(Canada) Jason Ho-Shue (Canada) Nyl Yakura	7–21 retired	(silver) Runner-up
2018	Dubai International	(Malaysia) Lim Khim Wah	(South Korea) Kim Sang-soo (South Korea) Yoo Yeon-seong	16–21, 9–21	(silver) Runner-up
2020	Uganda International	(India) Shivam Sharma	(Nigeria) Godwin Olofua (Nigeria) Anuoluwapo Juwon Opeyori	21–15, 22–20	(gold) Winner

Mixed doubles
Year	Tournament	Partner	Opponent	Score	Result
2013	India International	(India) Ashwini Ponnappa	(India) Akshay Dewalkar (India) Pradnya Gadre	17–21, 21–18, 18–21	(silver) Runner-up
2015	Uganda International	(India) N. Sikki Reddy	(Turkey) Muhammed Ali Kurt (Turkey) Kader İnal	11–6, 11–4, 11–6	(gold) Winner
2015	Romanian International	(India) N. Sikki Reddy	(Germany) Jones Ralfy Jansen (Germany) Cisita Joity Jansen	11–7, 11–8, 11–4	(gold) Winner
2015	Lagos International	(India) N. Sikki Reddy	(Poland) Robert Mateusiak (Poland) Nadieżda Zięba	19–21, 7–21	(silver) Runner-up
2020	Uganda International	(India) Meghana Jakkampudi	(India) Shivam Sharma (India) Poorvisha S. Ram	21–7, 14–21, 21–16	(gold) Winner
2022	El Salvador International	(India) Sri Krishna Priya Kudaravalli	(Spain) Joan Monroy (Spain) Ania Setién	11–21, 17–21	(silver) Runner-up
2024 (II)	Bahrain International	(India) Sri Krishna Priya Kudaravalli	(Kazakhstan) Dmitriy Panarin (Kazakhstan) Aisha Zhumabek	21–18, 18–21, 12–21	(silver) Runner-up

BWF International Challenge tournament
BWF International Series tournament
BWF Future Series tournament
