= Arun Vishnu =

Indian badminton player (born 1988)

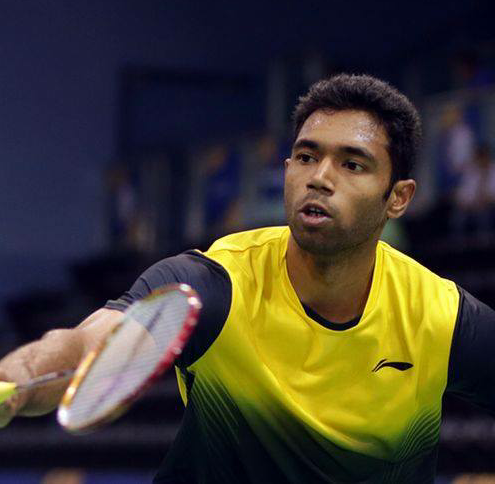

Personal information
- Born: Sivarajan Revamma Arun Vishnu; 2 August 1988 (age 38) Calicut, Kerala, India
- Height: 1.86 m (6 ft 1 in)
- Weight: 90 kg (198 lb)

Sport
- Country: India
- Sport: Badminton
- Handedness: Right
- Coached by: Pullela Gopichand; A Nazer

Doubles
- Highest ranking: 37
- BWF profile

Arun Vishnu (born 2 August 1988) is an Indian badminton player, from Calicut, Kerala, who represented India in several international tournaments. He partnered with Aparna Balan and Alwin Francis in mixed doubles category and men's doubles category respectively. His career best world ranking was 37 and 41 in men's doubles and mixed doubles category respectively. Since 2016 he is coach of Indian National Badminton Team.

== Playing career ==
Vishnu started playing badminton at the age of 12 under Kerala Sports Council Coach A. Nazer. He trained at Gopichand Badminton Academy in Hyderabad under the guidance of Pullela Gopichand.

Vishnu and Aparna Balan were Indian National Badminton Champion in Mixed Doubles category in 2011, 2012, 2013, 2014 & 2015. He and Tarun Kona were Indian National Badminton Champion in Men's Doubles category in 2011.

Vishnu and Alwin Francis won Men Doubles Gold medal at National Games 2011, Ranchi. Vishnu and Aparna Balan won Mixed Doubles Gold Medal at National Games 2015, Kochi.

He has represented India in World Badminton Championships 2015, 2014, 2013 & 2009, Asian Games 2010, Asian Badminton Championships 2016, 2015, 2013, 2012, 2011 & 2010, Sudirman Cup 2015, 2013, 2011 & 2009, and Thomas Cup 2014. In the Indian Badminton League 2013, Vishnu played for the Pune Pistons.

== Coaching career ==
Vishnu started coaching the Indian National Badminton Team from 2016. He was the coach of Indian Badminton Team for the following major tournaments: Commonwealth Games 2022, Asian Games 2018 & 2022, World Badminton Championship 2021, 2022 & 2023, Thomas & Uber Cup 2021, Badminton Asia Championship 2022 & 2023, Badminton Asia Team Championship 2024, Badminton Asia Mixed Team Championship 2023, All England Championship 2022, 2023 & 2024, Junior World Badminton Championship 2017 & 2018.

As a Coach, Vishnu guided Chennai Smashers to Premier Badminton League 2017 title on his maiden assignment as Coach.

Currently he trains Treesa Jolly, Gayatri Gopichand, Tanisha Crasto, and Ashwini Ponnappa in Indian National Badminton Camp along with Pullela Gopichand.

== Achievements ==
=== BWF Grand Prix ===
The BWF Grand Prix had two levels, the BWF Grand Prix and Grand Prix Gold. It was a series of badminton tournaments sanctioned by the Badminton World Federation (BWF) which was held from 2007 to 2017.

Mixed doubles
Year	Tournament	Partner	Opponent	Score	Result
2009	India Grand Prix	(India) Aparna Balan	(India) Tarun Kona (India) Shruti Kurien	21–14, 17–21, 21–19	(gold) Winner

BWF Grand Prix Gold tournament
BWF Grand Prix tournament

=== BWF International ===
Men's doubles
Year	Tournament	Partner	Opponent	Score	Result
2010	Tata Open India International	(India) Akshay Dewalkar	(Indonesia) Joko Riyadi (Indonesia) Yoga Ukikasah	22–24, 16–21	(silver) Runner-up
2011	Bangladesh International	(India) Tarun Kona	(Vietnam) Bùi Bằng Đức (Vietnam) Đào Mạnh Thắng	21–7, 22–20	(gold) Winner
2012	Iran Fajr International	(India) Tarun Kona	(Indonesia) Marcus Fernaldi Gideon (Indonesia) Agripina Prima Rahmanto Putra	18–21, 18–21	(silver) Runner-up

Mixed doubles
Year	Tournament	Partner	Opponent	Score	Result
2008	Bahrain International	(India) Aparna Balan	(India) Valiyaveetil Diju (India) Trupti Murgunde	17–21, 21–18, 21–19	(gold) Winner
2009	Spanish Open	(India) Aparna Balan	(England) Robin Middleton (England) Mariana Agathangelou	16–21, 15–21	(silver) Runner-up
2010	Tata Open India International	(India) Aparna Balan	(Thailand) Patipat Chalardchaleam (Thailand) Savitree Amitapai	10–21, 15–21	(silver) Runner-up
2011	Maldives International	(India) Aparna Balan	(Canada) Toby Ng (Canada) Grace Gao	21–10, 12–21, 9–21	(silver) Runner-up
2013	Bahrain International	(India) Aparna Balan	(India) Valiyaveetil Diju (India) N. Sikki Reddy	21–14, 25–23	(gold) Winner
2015	Sri Lanka International	(India) Aparna Balan	(Australia) Robin Middleton (Australia) Leanne Choo	15–21, 21–17, 21–13	(gold) Winner
2015	Tata Open India International	(India) Aparna Balan	(India) Satwiksairaj Rankireddy (India) K. Maneesha	13–21, 16–21	(silver) Runner-up

BWF International Challenge tournament
BWF International Series tournament
BWF Future Series tournament

== Family ==
In 2016 January, Arun Vishnu married Nagpur native badminton player Arundhati Pantawane. The couple has a son, Adharv Arun Vishnu.
