= Syed Modi International Badminton Championships =

International badminton tournament held annually in India

Syed Modi International
- Official website
- Founded: 2009; 17 years ago
- Editions: 14 (2025)
- Location: Lucknow (2025); India
- Venue: Babu Banarasi Das Indoor Stadium (2025)
- Prize money: USD240,000 (2025)

Men's
- Draw: 32S / 32D
- Current champions: Jason Gunawan (singles); Kang Khai Xing; Aaron Tai (doubles)
- Most singles titles: 2 Kashyap Parupalli; Sameer Verma
- Most doubles titles: 2 Mathias Boe; Carsten Mogensen

Women's
- Draw: 32S / 32D
- Current champions: Hina Akechi (singles); Treesa Jolly; Gayatri Gopichand (doubles)
- Most singles titles: 3 Saina Nehwal; P. V. Sindhu
- Most doubles titles: 2 Jung Kyung-eun; Treesa Jolly; Gayatri Gopichand

Mixed doubles
- Draw: 32
- Current champions: Dejan Ferdinansyah; Bernadine Wardana
- Most titles (male): 2 Dejan Ferdinansyah
- Most titles (female): 1, all winners

Super 300
- Canada Open; German Open; Korea Masters; Macau Open; New Zealand Open; Orléans Masters; Spain Masters; Swiss Open; Syed Modi International; Taipei Open; Thailand Masters; U.S. Open

Ongoing
- 2025 Syed Modi International

The Syed Modi International Badminton Championships is a BWF World Tour Super 300 international badminton tournament held annually in India.

It was introduced to the badminton circuit as a BWF Grand Prix event in 2009. Since then the tournament has been annually held in Lucknow at the Babu Banarasi Das Indoor Stadium, although it was temporarily shifted to Hyderabad in 2010. In 2011, it was upgraded to the Grand Prix Gold event. Badminton World Federation launched a new event structure in 2017. This tournament was then announced as a World Tour Super 300 event ever since 2018.

== History ==
The tournament was inaugurated by Uttar Pradesh Badminton Association in 1991 as the Syed Modi Memorial Badminton Tournament in memory of Commonwealth Games champion Syed Modi.

From its inauguration till 2003, it remained a national-level tournament. In 2004, it was organized as an international event for the first time, which saw some foreign participation.

The tournament was halted from 2005 to 2008 due to a political impasse between the UPBA and the Government of Uttar Pradesh, which ended with relocation of the Uttar Pradesh Badminton Academy.

== Locations ==
Below is the cities that have hosted the tournament.

- Lucknow: 2009, 2011–2012, 2014–2019, 2022–2026
- Hyderabad: 2010
Locations of Syed Modi International Badminton Championships host cities

== Winners ==
Year	Men's singles	Women's singles	Men's doubles	Women's doubles	Mixed doubles	Ref
2009	(India) Chetan Anand	(India) Saina Nehwal	(Indonesia) Fauzi Adnan (Indonesia) Trikusuma Wardhana	(Japan) Misaki Matsutomo (Japan) Ayaka Takahashi	(India) Arun Vishnu (India) Aparna Balan	
2010	(Indonesia) Dionysius Hayom Rumbaka	(China) Zhou Hui	(Indonesia) Mohammad Ahsan (Indonesia) Bona Septano	(China) Tang Jinhua (China) Xia Huan	(China) Liu Peixuan (China) Tang Jinhua	
2011	(Indonesia) Taufik Hidayat	(Thailand) Ratchanok Intanon	(Japan) Naoki Kawamae (Japan) Shoji Sato	(Singapore) Shinta Mulia Sari (Singapore) Yao Lei	(Thailand) Sudket Prapakamol (Thailand) Saralee Thungthongkam	
2012	(India) Parupalli Kashyap	(Indonesia) Lindaweni Fanetri	(South Korea) Ko Sung-hyun (South Korea) Lee Yong-dae	(Thailand) Savitree Amitrapai (Thailand) Sapsiree Taerattanachai	(Indonesia) Fran Kurniawan (Indonesia) Shendy Puspa Irawati	
2013	No competition					
2014	(China) Xue Song	(India) Saina Nehwal	(China) Li Junhui (China) Liu Yuchen	(China) Chen Qingchen (China) Jia Yifan	(China) Wang Yilyu (China) Huang Yaqiong	
2015	(India) Parupalli Kashyap	(India) Saina Nehwal	(Denmark) Mathias Boe (Denmark) Carsten Mogensen	(Malaysia) Amelia Alicia Anscelly (Malaysia) Soong Fie Cho	(Indonesia) Riky Widianto (Indonesia) Richi Puspita Dili	
2016	(India) Srikanth Kidambi	(South Korea) Sung Ji-hyun	(Malaysia) Goh V Shem (Malaysia) Tan Wee Kiong	(South Korea) Jung Kyung-eun (South Korea) Shin Seung-chan	(Indonesia) Praveen Jordan (Indonesia) Debby Susanto	
2017	(India) Sameer Verma	(India) P. V. Sindhu	(Denmark) Mathias Boe (Denmark) Carsten Mogensen	(Denmark) Christinna Pedersen (Denmark) Kamilla Rytter Juhl	(India) Pranav Chopra (India) N. Sikki Reddy	
2018	(India) Sameer Verma	(China) Han Yue	(Indonesia) Fajar Alfian (Indonesia) Muhammad Rian Ardianto	(Malaysia) Chow Mei Kuan (Malaysia) Lee Meng Yean	(China) Ou Xuanyi (China) Feng Xueying	
2019	(Chinese Taipei) Wang Tzu-wei	(Spain) Carolina Marín	(China) He Jiting (China) Tan Qiang	(South Korea) Baek Ha-na (South Korea) Jung Kyung-eun	(Russia) Rodion Alimov (Russia) Alina Davletova	
2020	Cancelled (Note: This tournament, originally to be played from 17 to 22 November, was later cancelled due to COVID-19 pandemic in India.)					
2021	Cancelled (Note: This tournament, originally to be played from 12 to 17 October, was later cancelled due to COVID-19 pandemic in India.)					
2022	Not awarded	(India) P. V. Sindhu	(Malaysia) Man Wei Chong (Malaysia) Tee Kai Wun	(Malaysia) Anna Cheong (Malaysia) Teoh Mei Xing	(India) Ishaan Bhatnagar (India) Tanisha Crasto	
2023	(Chinese Taipei) Chi Yu-jen	(Japan) Nozomi Okuhara	(Malaysia) Choong Hon Jian (Malaysia) Muhammad Haikal	(Japan) Rin Iwanaga (Japan) Kie Nakanishi	(Indonesia) Dejan Ferdinansyah (Indonesia) Gloria Emanuelle Widjaja	
2024	(India) Lakshya Sen	(India) P. V. Sindhu	(China) Huang Di (China) Liu Yang	(India) Treesa Jolly (India) Gayatri Gopichand	(Thailand) Dechapol Puavaranukroh (Thailand) Supissara Paewsampran	
2025	(Hong Kong) Jason Gunawan	(Japan) Hina Akechi	(Malaysia) Kang Khai Xing (Malaysia) Aaron Tai	(India) Treesa Jolly (India) Gayatri Gopichand	(Indonesia) Dejan Ferdinansyah (Indonesia) Bernadine Wardana	

== Performance by nations ==
As of the 2025 edition

Pos.	Nation	MS	WS	MD	WD	XD	Total
1	India	7	6		2	3	18
2	China	1	2	3	2	3	11
2	Indonesia	2	1	3		5	11
4	Malaysia			4	3		7
5	Japan		2	1	2		5
6	South Korea		1	1	2		4
6	Thailand		1		1	2	4
8	Denmark			2	1		3
9	Chinese Taipei	2					2
10	Hong Kong	1					1
10	Russia					1	1
10	Singapore				1		1
10	Spain		1				1
Total		13*	14	14	14	14	69

Note: Men's singles was not awarded in 2022 due to COVID-19

== See also ==
- India Open
- Hyderabad Open (Defunct)
- Odisha Masters
- Guwahati Masters
- India International Challenge
