= Wisnu Yuli Prasetyo =

Indonesian badminton player (born 1994)

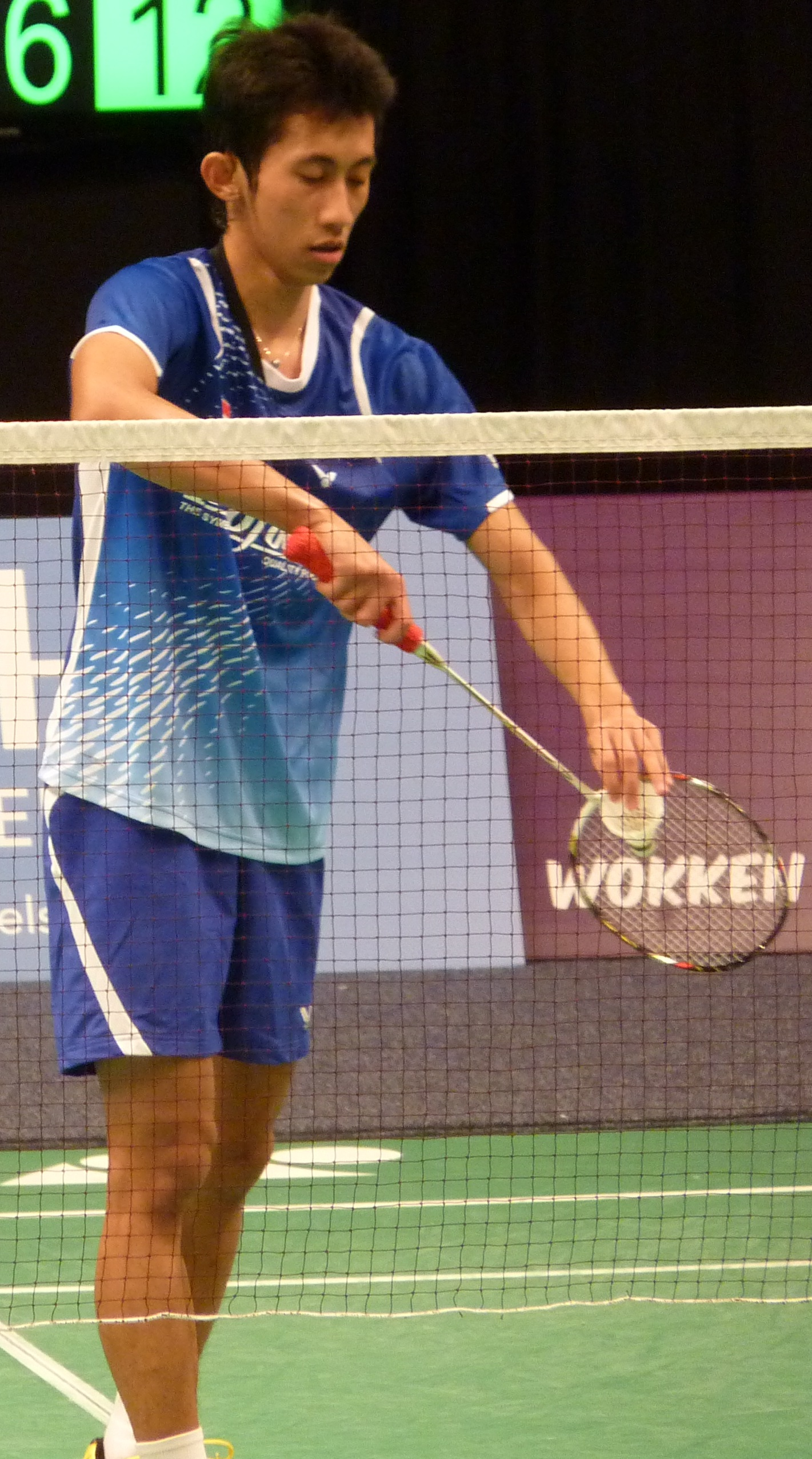

Personal information
- Born: Wisnu Yuli Prasetyo; 11 July 1994 (age 31) Tulungagung, East Java, Indonesia
- Height: 1.70 m (5 ft 7 in)

Sport
- Country: Indonesia
- Sport: Badminton
- Handedness: Right

Men's singles
- Highest ranking: 44 (20 June 2013)
- BWF profile
Medal record
Men's badminton
Representing Indonesia
Southeast Asian Games
Bronze medal – third place	2013 Naypyidaw	Men's singles

Wisnu Yuli Prasetyo (born 11 July 1994) is an Indonesian badminton player. He joined the PB Djarum in 2015, and previously played for the Surya Baja Surabaya in East Java. He won his first senior international title at the 2012 Malaysia International tournament, and in 2013, he won the men's singles bronze at the Southeast Asian Games. In 2017, he emerged as the men's singles champion at the National Championships in Pangkal Pinang.

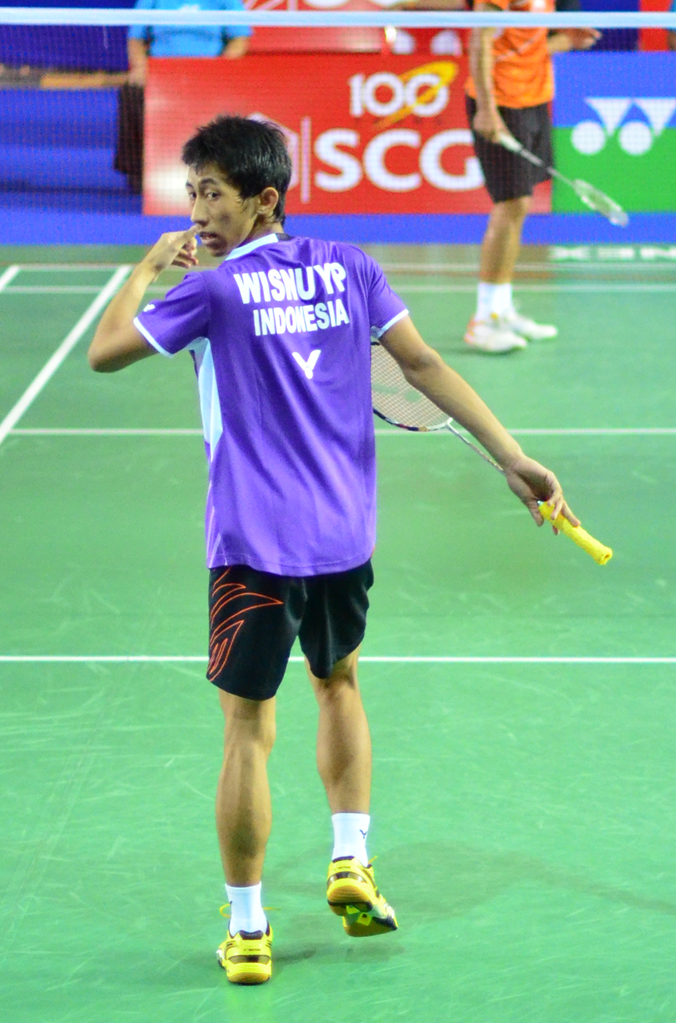
Prasetyo at the 2013 Thailand Open

== Achievements ==
=== Southeast Asian Games ===
Year	Venue	Opponent	Score	Result
2013	Wunna Theikdi Indoor Stadium, Naypyidaw, Myanmar	(Thailand) Tanongsak Saensomboonsuk	21–17, 11–21, 12–21	Bronze

=== BWF International Challenge/Series ===
Year	Tournament	Opponent	Score	Result
2011	Singapore International	(Japan) Kazuteru Kozai	17–21, 21–23	(silver) Runner-up
2012	Vietnam International	(Singapore) Derek Wong	21–17, 20–22, 10–21	(silver) Runner-up
2012	Indonesia International	(Indonesia) Alamsyah Yunus	22–20, 16–21, 10–21	(silver) Runner-up
2012	Malaysia International	(Malaysia) Muhammad Hafiz Hashim	3–21, 21–19, 21–18	(gold) Winner
2015	USM Indonesia International	(Indonesia) Reksy Aureza Megananda	25–23, 21–14	(gold) Winner

BWF International Challenge tournament
BWF International Series tournament

== Performance timeline ==
=== National team ===
- Junior level

Team events	2011
World Junior Championships	7th

=== Individual competitions ===
- Junior level

Event	2011
World Junior Championships	QF

- Senior level

Event	2011	2013
Southeast Asian Games	A	Bronze
Asian Championships	R2	A

Tournament	2019	Best
BWF World Tour
Indonesia Masters Super 100	QF	QF (2019)
Year-end Ranking	359	44

Tournament	2013	2014	2015	2016	2017	Best
BWF Super Series
India Open	A	w/d	A			
Singapore Open	Q1	A				Q1 (2013)
(Australia) Australian Open	GPG	Q2	A			R1 (2013)
Indonesia Open	Q1	R2	Q1	Q1	A	R2 (2014)

Tournament	2010	2011	2012	2013	2014	2015	2016	2017	Best
BWF Grand Prix and Grand Prix Gold
Malaysia Masters	A		R1	A	R3	A	R1	QF	QF (2017)
(India) Syed Modi International	A			—N/a	A		R1	A	R1 (2016)
(Germany) German Open	A			R2	R1	R1	A		R2 (2013)
(Australia) Australian Open	A			R1	SS				R1 (2013)
New Zealand Open	—N/a	A	—N/a	R3	A	R1	A		R3 (2013)
Canada Open	A					R3	A		R3 (2015)
Vietnam Open	A		R1	A		R3	R3	R1	R3 (2015, 2016)
Indonesia Masters	R3	R2	R2	QF	w/d	SF	R1	—N/a	SF (2015)
Thailand Open	—N/a	A	R1	SF	—N/a	R1	R2	A	SF (2013)
Chinese Taipei Masters	—N/a					A	R1	—N/a	R1 (2016)
(England) London Grand Prix Gold	—N/a			R3	—N/a				R3 (2013)
(Netherlands) Dutch Open	A			R3	A				R3 (2013)
Chinese Taipei Open	A		SF	A		Q2	A		SF (2012)
Macau Open	A		R2	A					R2 (2012)
(South Korea) Korea Masters	A		R3	R1	A				R3 (2012)
Year-end Ranking	328	170	63	83	167	125	193	184	44

== Record against selected opponents ==
Record against year-end Finals finalists, World Championships semi finalists, and Olympic quarter finalists.

Player	Matches	Win	Lost	Diff.
(China) Shi Yuqi	2	1	1	0
(Chinese Taipei) Chou Tien-chen	2	0	2	–2
(Denmark) Hans-Kristian Vittinghus	1	0	1	–1
(England) Rajiv Ouseph	1	1	0	+1
(India) B. Sai Praneeth	4	2	2	0
(Indonesia) Tommy Sugiarto	4	0	4	–4
(Malaysia) Liew Daren	1	0	1	–1
(Thailand) Boonsak Ponsana	2	0	2	–2
(Thailand) Kantaphon Wangcharoen	2	1	1	0
(Vietnam) Nguyễn Tiến Minh	3	2	1	+1
