= 2013 All England Super Series Premier =

Badminton championships

2013 All England Super Series
Tournament details
- Dates: 5–10 March
- Edition: 103rd
- Level: Super Series Premier
- Total prize money: US$400,000
- Venue: National Indoor Arena
- Location: Birmingham, England

Champions
- Men's singles: (China) Chen Long
- Women's singles: (Denmark) Tine Baun
- Men's doubles: (China) Liu Xiaolong (China) Qiu Zihan
- Women's doubles: (China) Wang Xiaoli (China) Yu Yang
- Mixed doubles: (Indonesia) Tontowi Ahmad (Indonesia) Liliyana Natsir

The 2013 All England Super Series Premier was the third super series tournament of the 2013 BWF Super Series. The tournament was held in Birmingham, England, from 5 to 10 March 2013. A qualification was held to fill four places in all five disciplines of the main draws.

== Men's singles ==
=== Seeds ===
1. (Malaysia) Lee Chong Wei (final)
2. (China) Chen Long (champion)
3. (China) Du Pengyu (first round)
4. (Indonesia) Sony Dwi Kuncoro (second round)
5. (China) Chen Jin (quarterfinals)
6. (Hong Kong) Hu Yun (first round)
7. (Japan) Kenichi Tago (second round)
8. (Vietnam) Nguyen Tien Minh (quarterfinals)

=== Top half ===
First Round
1	(Malaysia) Lee C W	13	21	23
(Hong Kong) Wong W K	21	6	21
(China) Wang ZM	15	21	21
(India) A Jayaram	21	18	10
8	(Vietnam) Nguyen T M	21	15	21
Q2	(Malaysia) Tan C S	12	21	15
(Indonesia) D H Rumbaka	21	14	22
Q1	(India) S Varma	10	21	24
3	(China) Du PY	17	21	18
(Chinese Taipei) Chou T-c	21	10	21
(Indonesia) T Sugiarto	21	21
(China) Gao H	14	13
6	(Hong Kong) Hu Y	16	21	21
Q3	(Thailand) T Saensomboonsuk	21	11	23
(Japan) S Sasaki	21	21
(Indonesia) T Hidayat	16	11

Second Round
1	(Malaysia) Lee C W	21	21
(China) Wang ZM	17	19
8	(Vietnam) Nguyen T M	21	21
Q1	(India) S Varma	19	19
(Chinese Taipei) Chou T-c	12	8
(Indonesia) T Sugiarto	21	21
Q3	(Thailand) T Saensomboonsuk	21	21
(Japan) S Sasaki	9	11

Quarterfinals
1	(Malaysia) Lee C W	21	21
8	(Vietnam) Nguyen T M	17	19
(Indonesia) T Sugiarto	17	11
Q3	(Thailand) T Saensomboonsuk	21	21

Semifinals
1	(Malaysia) Lee C W	22	21
Q3	(Thailand) T Saensomboonsuk	20	8

=== Bottom half ===
First Round
(Denmark) H-K Vittinghus	16	21	11
Q4	(China) Chen YK	21	12	21
(Malaysia) Liew DR	15	21	11
5	(China) Chen J	21	19
(Malaysia) Chong W F	11	14
(Denmark) J Ø Jørgensen	21	21
(Russia) V Ivanov	22	17	11
4	(Indonesia) S D Kuncoro	20	21	21
(India) K Parupalli	21	21
(Chinese Taipei) Hsu J-h	17	18
(Denmark) V Axelsen	20	15
7	(Japan) K Tago	22	21
(Japan) T Ueda	18	21	21
(Germany) M Zwiebler	21	13	19
(Thailand) B Ponsana	21	10	15
2	(China) Chen L	18	21	21

Second Round
Q4	(China) Chen YK	10	10
5	(China) Chen J	21	21
(Denmark) J Ø Jørgensen	11
4	(Indonesia) S D Kuncoro	7^{r}
(India) K Parupalli	21	21
7	(Japan) K Tago	18	12
(Japan) T Ueda	15	10
2	(China) Chen L	21	21

Quarterfinals
5	(China) Chen J	7	14
(Denmark) J Ø Jørgensen	21	21
(India) K Parupalli	16	10
2	(China) Chen L	21	21

Semifinals
(Denmark) J Ø Jørgensen	19	20
2	(China) Chen L	21	22

=== Finals ===
Semifinals
1	(Malaysia) Lee Chong Wei	22	21
Q3	(Thailand) Tanongsak Saensomboonsuk	20	8
(Denmark) Jan Ø. Jørgensen	19	20
2	(China) Chen Long	21	22

Final
1	(Malaysia) Lee Chong Wei	17	18
2	(China) Chen Long	21	21

== Women's singles ==
=== Seeds ===
1. (China) Li Xuerui (first round)
2. (India) Saina Nehwal (semifinals)
3. (China) Wang Yihan (first round)
4. (Germany) Juliane Schenk (quarterfinals)
5. (South Korea) Sung Ji-Hyun (semifinals)
6. (China) Wang Shixian (quarterfinals)
7. (Denmark) Tine Baun (champion)
8. (Thailand) Ratchanok Inthanon (final)

=== Top half ===
First Round
1	(China) Li XR	18	18
(South Korea) Bae Y-j	21	21
(Japan) E Hirose	21	11	21
Q4	(Canada) M Li	19	21	14
5	(South Korea) Sung J-h	21	21
(Bulgaria) P Nedelcheva	15	14
(Hong Kong) Chan T K	10	9
(Chinese Taipei) Pai H-m	21	21
3	(China) Wang YH	12	19
(Indonesia) L Fanetri	21	21
(Singapore) Gu J	23	18
(Thailand) P Buranaprasertsuk	25	21
7	(Denmark) T Baun	21	21
Q3	(France) S V Waran	12	10
(China) Han L	21	21
(Hong Kong) Yip P Y	12	9

Second Round
(South Korea) Bae Y-j	22	20	19
(Japan) E Hirose	20	22	21
5	(South Korea) Sung J-h	21	21
(Chinese Taipei) Pai H-m	12	10
(Indonesia) L Fanetri	21	21
(Thailand) P Buranaprasertsuk	14	10
7	(Denmark) T Baun	21	22
(China) Han L	13	20

Quarterfinals
(Japan) E Hirose	13	12
5	(South Korea) Sung J-h	21	21
(Indonesia) L Fanetri	7	13
7	(Denmark) T Baun	21	21

Semifinals
5	(South Korea) Sung J-h	22	21	19
7	(Denmark) T Baun	24	19	21

=== Bottom half ===
First Round
(Indonesia) A Firdasari	13	19
(Thailand) N Jindapon	21	21
(Chinese Taipei) Tai T-y	18	13
8	(Thailand) R Inthanon	21	21
(India) P V Sindhu	21	21
(Thailand) B Ongbumrungpan	13	18
(Indonesia) A Yuswandari	19	17
4	(Germany) J Schenk	21	21
Q1	(Japan) S Takahashi	21	19	18
(China) Jiang YJ	18	21	21
(Spain) C Marín	21	19	18
6	(China) Wang SX	16	21	21
(Japan) M Mitani	14	8
Q2	(Indonesia) B Manuputty	21	21
(Thailand) S Taerattanachai	8	21	16
2	(India) S Nehwal	21	18	21

Second Round
(Thailand) N Jindapon	18	17
8	(Thailand) R Inthanon	21	21
(India) P V Sindhu	17	14
4	(Germany) J Schenk	21	21
(China) Jiang YJ	11	13
6	(China) Wang SX	21	21
Q2	(Indonesia) B Manuputty	16	11
2	(India) S Nehwal	21	21

Quarterfinals
8	(Thailand) R Inthanon	13	21	21
4	(Germany) J Schenk	21	12	8
6	(China) Wang SX	21	21	16
2	(India) S Nehwal	23	19	21

Semifinals
8	(Thailand) R Inthanon	21	21
2	(India) S Nehwal	15	19

=== Finals ===
Semifinals
5	(South Korea) Sung Ji-hyun	22	21	19
7	(Denmark) Tine Baun	24	19	21
8	(Thailand) Ratchanok Inthanon	21	21
2	(India) Saina Nehwal	15	19

Final
7	(Denmark) Tine Baun	21	16	21
8	(Thailand) Ratchanok Inthanon	14	21	10

== Men's doubles ==
=== Seeds ===
1. (Denmark) Mathias Boe / Carsten Mogensen (second round)
2. (Malaysia) Koo Kien Keat / Tan Boon Heong (second round)
3. (South Korea) Ko Sung-Hyun / Lee Yong-Dae (first round)
4. (Japan) Hiroyuki Endo / Kenichi Hayakawa (final)
5. (China) Hong Wei / Shen Ye (first round)
6. (South Korea) Kim Ki-Jung / Kim Sa-Rang (quarterfinals)
7. (China) Cai Yun / Fu Haifeng (first round)
8. (Indonesia) Mohammad Ahsan / Hendra Setiawan (semifinals)

=== Top half ===
First Round
1	(Denmark) M Boe (Denmark) C Mogensen	21	21
(Indonesia) A Pratama (Indonesia) R A Saputro	18	19
(China) Liu XL (China) Qiu ZH	21	18	21
(Russia) V Ivanov (Russia) I Sozonov	13	21	16
7	(China) Cai Y (China) Fu HF
(Indonesia) R K Suwardi (Indonesia) M Ulinnuha	w	/	o
Q3	(Germany) P Käsbauer (Germany) J Zurwonne	11	22	10
(Malaysia) M Z A Latif (Malaysia) M F M Tazari	21	20	21
3	(South Korea) Ko S-h (South Korea) Lee Y-d	21	18
(Germany) I Kindervater (Germany) J Schöttler	23	21
(Malaysia) Hoon T H (Malaysia) Tan W K	21	21
(Indonesia) Y S Dasuki (Indonesia) H A Gunawan	16	12
8	(Indonesia) M Ahsan (Indonesia) H Setiawan	18	22	21
(China) Chai B (China) Zhang N	21	20	14
(Chinese Taipei) Lee S-m (Chinese Taipei) Tsai C-h	21	21
Q2	(England) M Ellis (Scotland) P Van Rietvelde	15	14

Second Round
1	(Denmark) M Boe (Denmark) C Mogensen	21	11	25
(China) Liu XL (China) Qiu ZH	11	21	27
(Indonesia) R K Suwardi (Indonesia) M Ulinnuha	19	15
(Malaysia) M Z A Latif (Malaysia) M F M Tazari	21	21
(Germany) I Kindervater (Germany) J Schöttler	15	15
(Malaysia) Hoon T H (Malaysia) Tan W K	21	21
8	(Indonesia) M Ahsan (Indonesia) H Setiawan	23	21
(Chinese Taipei) Lee S-m (Chinese Taipei) Tsai C-h	21	16

Quarterfinals
(China) Liu XL (China) Qiu ZH	21	21
(Malaysia) M Z A Latif (Malaysia) M F M Tazari	12	10
(Malaysia) Hoon T H (Malaysia) Tan W K	12	16
8	(Indonesia) M Ahsan (Indonesia) H Setiawan	21	21

Semifinals
(China) Liu XL (China) Qiu ZH	21	13	21
8	(Indonesia) M Ahsan (Indonesia) H Setiawan	12	21	17

=== Bottom half ===
First Round
(Japan) H Hashimoto (Japan) N Hirata	12	23	21
(Malaysia) Goh V S (Malaysia) Lim K W	21	21	18
(Denmark) R Bonde (Denmark) M Conrad-Petersen	14	18
6	(South Korea) Kim K-j (South Korea) Kim S-r	21	21
Q1	(Scotland) R Blair (Malaysia) Tan B S	17	21	21
(Indonesia) A Y Chandra (Indonesia) M Kido	21	19	15
Q4	(Thailand) B Issara (Thailand) P Vilailak	20	25	14
4	(Japan) H Endo (Japan) K Hayakawa	22	23	21
(Chinese Taipei) Chen H-l (Chinese Taipei) Lu C-b	21	21
(Malaysia) Gan T C (Malaysia) Ong S H	12	12
(Poland) Ł Moren (Poland) W Szkudlarczyk	19	21	22
5	(China) Hong W (China) Shen Y	21	19	20
(Thailand) M Jongjit (Thailand) N Puangpuapech	21	16	21
(England) C Langridge (England) P Mills	13	21	8
(England) C Adcock (England) A Ellis	19	22
2	(Malaysia) Koo K K (Malaysia) Tan B H	21	24

Second Round
(Japan) H Hashimoto (Japan) N Hirata	18	18
6	(South Korea) Kim K-j (South Korea) Kim S-r	21	21
Q1	(Scotland) R Blair (Malaysia) Tan B S	21	13	14
4	(Japan) H Endo (Japan) K Hayakawa	17	21	21
(Chinese Taipei) Chen H-l (Chinese Taipei) Lu C-b	20	23	21
(Poland) Ł Moren (Poland) W Szkudlarczyk	22	21	18
(Thailand) M Jongjit (Thailand) N Puangpuapech	21	21
2	(Malaysia) Koo K K (Malaysia) Tan B H	17	18

Quarterfinals
6	(South Korea) Kim K-j (South Korea) Kim S-r	21	12	19
4	(Japan) H Endo (Japan) K Hayakawa	16	21	21
(Chinese Taipei) Chen H-l (Chinese Taipei) Lu C-b	11	13
(Thailand) M Jongjit (Thailand) N Puangpuapech	21	21

Semifinals
4	(Japan) H Endo (Japan) K Hayakawa	22	21
(Thailand) M Jongjit (Thailand) N Puangpuapech	20	15

=== Finals ===
Semifinals
(China) Liu Xiaolong (China) Qiu Zihan	21	13	21
8	(Indonesia) Mohammad Ahsan (Indonesia) Hendra Setiawan	12	21	17
4	(Japan) Hiroyuki Endo (Japan) Kenichi Hayakawa	22	21
(Thailand) Maneepong Jongjit (Thailand) Nipitphon Puangpuapech	20	15

Final
(China) Liu Xiaolong (China) Qiu Zihan	21	21
4	(Japan) Hiroyuki Endo (Japan) Kenichi Hayakawa	11	9

== Women's doubles ==
=== Seeds ===
1. (China) Wang Xiaoli / Yu Yang (champion)
2. (Denmark) Christinna Pedersen / Kamilla Rytter Juhl (first round)
3. (Japan) Misaki Matsutomo / Ayaka Takahashi (first round)
4. (South Korea) Eom Hye-Won / Jang Ye-Na (second round)
5. (China) Ma Jin / Tang Jinhua (semifinals)
6. (Japan) Miyuki Maeda / Satoko Suetsuna (semifinals)
7. (South Korea) Jung Kyung-Eun / Kim Ha-Na (quarterfinals)
8. (Thailand) Duanganong Aroonkesorn / Kunchala Voravichitchaikul (quarterfinals)

=== Top half ===
First Round
1	(China) Wang XL (China) Yu Y	21	21
(Malaysia) Ng H E (Malaysia) Ng H L	15	16
(United States) E Lee (United States) P Obanana	21	21
(Thailand) L Narissapat (Thailand) S Thoungthongkam	17	18
7	(South Korea) Jung K-e (South Korea) Kim H-n	14	21	21
Q4	(Scotland) I Bankier (Bulgaria) P Nedelcheva	21	18	15
(Hong Kong) Poon L Y (Hong Kong) Tse Y S	21	21
(Thailand) S Amitrapai (Thailand) S Taerattanachai	13	18
4	(South Korea) Eom H-w (South Korea) Jang Y-n	21	21
PMD	(Canada) N Grether (Canada) C Reid	9	12
(Sweden) E Lennartsson (Sweden) E Wengberg	11	13
(Malaysia) Hoo V K M (Malaysia) Woon KW	21	21
6	(Japan) M Maeda (Japan) S Suetsuna	22	22
(Denmark) L Kruse (Denmark) M Rœpke	20	20
(Indonesia) A F Agustin (Indonesia) N K Maheswari	21	21
(Macau) Wang R (Macau) Zhang ZB	17	18

Second Round
1	(China) Wang XL (China) Yu Y	21	21
(United States) E Lee (United States) P Obanana	14	13
7	(South Korea) Jung K-e (South Korea) Kim H-n	22	21
(Hong Kong) Poon L Y (Hong Kong) Tse Y S	20	19
4	(South Korea) Eom H-w (South Korea) Jang Y-n	13	21	17
(Malaysia) Hoo V K M (Malaysia) Woon KW	21	17	21
6	(Japan) M Maeda (Japan) S Suetsuna	17	21	21
(Indonesia) A F Agustin (Indonesia) N K Maheswari	21	12	9

Quarterfinals
1	(China) Wang XL (China) Yu Y	21	21
7	(South Korea) Jung K-e (South Korea) Kim H-n	18	14
(Malaysia) Hoo V K M (Malaysia) Woon KW	16	13
6	(Japan) M Maeda (Japan) S Suetsuna	21	21

Semifinals
1	(China) Wang XL (China) Yu Y	21	21
6	(Japan) M Maeda (Japan) S Suetsuna	11	16

=== Bottom half ===
First Round
Q3	(Thailand) A Serithammarak (Thailand) P Munkitamorn	24	11	18
(Indonesia) A S Awanda (Indonesia) G Polii	22	21	21
Q2	(England) L Smith (England) G White	16	7
5	(China) Ma J (China) Tang JH	21	21
(Indonesia) P Z Bernadeth (Indonesia) R A Pradipta	21	20	21
(Malaysia) Goh L Y (Malaysia) Lim Y L	19	22	17
(South Korea) Lee S-h (South Korea) Shin S-c	15	21	21
3	(Japan) M Matsutomo (Japan) A Takahashi	21	15	12
(Indonesia) G R Imawan (Indonesia) T R Nuraidah	17	13
(South Korea) Choi H-i (South Korea) Kim S-y	21	21
(Indonesia) S R Andini (Indonesia) D D Haris	15	29	19
8	(Thailand) D Aroonkesorn (Thailand) K Voravichitchaikul	21	27	21
Q1	(China) Cheng S (China) Zhao YL	9	21	21
(Germany) J Goliszewski (Germany) B Michels	21	16	14
(China) Bao YX (China) Tian Q	9	21	21
2	(Denmark) C Pedersen (Denmark) K Rytter Juhl	21	14	18

Second Round
(Indonesia) A S Awanda (Indonesia) G Polii	14	15
5	(China) Ma J (China) Tang JH	21	21
(Indonesia) P Z Bernadeth (Indonesia) R A Pradipta	21	21
(South Korea) Lee S-h (South Korea) Shin S-c	12	17
(South Korea) Choi H-i (South Korea) Kim S-y	18	17
8	(Thailand) D Aroonkesorn (Thailand) K Voravichitchaikul	21	21
Q1	(China) Cheng S (China) Zhao YL	21	11
(China) Bao YX (China) Tian Q	17	6^{r}

Quarterfinals
5	(China) Ma J (China) Tang JH	21	21
(Indonesia) P Z Bernadeth (Indonesia) R A Pradipta	13	13
8	(Thailand) D Aroonkesorn (Thailand) K Voravichitchaikul	19	19
Q1	(China) Cheng S (China) Zhao YL	21	21

Semifinals
5	(China) Ma J (China) Tang JH	18	7
Q1	(China) Cheng S (China) Zhao YL	21	21

=== Finals ===
Semifinals
1	(China) Wang Xiaoli (China) Yu Yang	21	21
6	(Japan) Miyuki Maeda (Japan) Satoko Suetsuna	11	16
5	(China) Ma Jin (China) Tang Jinhua	18	7
Q1	(China) Cheng Shu (China) Zhao Yunlei	21	21

Final
1	(China) Wang Xiaoli (China) Yu Yang	21	21
Q1	(China) Cheng Shu (China) Zhao Yunlei	18	10

== Mixed doubles ==
=== Seeds ===
1. (China) Xu Chen / Ma Jin (quarterfinals)
2. (Indonesia) Tontowi Ahmad/ Lilyana Natsir (champion)
3. (Malaysia) Chan Peng Soon / Goh Liu Ying (second round)
4. (Denmark) Joachim Fischer Nielsen / Christinna Pedersen (first round)
5. (China) Zhang Nan / Zhao Yunlei (final)
6. (Thailand) Sudket Prapakamol / Saralee Thoungthongkam (quarterfinals)
7. (Indonesia) Muhammad Rijal / Debby Susanto (semi-final)
8. (Poland) Robert Mateusiak / Nadiezda Zieba (quarterfinals)

=== Top half ===
First Round
1	(China) Xu C (China) Ma J	21	21
Q3	(England) C Adcock (England) G White	14	18
(Denmark) A Kristiansen (Denmark) J Houmann	19	23
(China) Qiu ZH (China) Bao YX	21	25
7	(Indonesia) M Rijal (Indonesia) D Susanto	13	21	21
(Singapore) D B Chrisnanta (Singapore) Y Y V Neo	21	17	14
(France) B Careme (France) A Fontaine	15	12
(Netherlands) J de Ruiter (Netherlands) S Barning	21	21
3	(Malaysia) Chan P S (Malaysia) Goh L Y	12	21	21
(Thailand) P Chalardchaleam (Thailand) S Amitrapai	21	15	11
(Indonesia) F Kurniawan (Indonesia) S P Irawati	21	21
(India) T Kona (India) A Ponnappa	18	10
5	(China) Zhang N (China) Zhao YL	21	21
(Denmark) M Pieler Kolding (Denmark) K Rytter Juhl	11	9
(Chinese Taipei) Chen H-l (Chinese Taipei) Pai H-m	15	21	11
Q4	(Indonesia) P Jordan (Indonesia) V Marissa	21	16	21

Second Round
1	(China) Xu C (China) Ma J	21	21
(China) Qiu ZH (China) Bao YX	10	17
7	(Indonesia) M Rijal (Indonesia) D Susanto	21	21
(Netherlands) J de Ruiter (Netherlands) S Barning	12	14
3	(Malaysia) Chan P S (Malaysia) Goh L Y	15	17
(Indonesia) F Kurniawan (Indonesia) S P Irawati	21	21
5	(China) Zhang N (China) Zhao YL	21	21
Q4	(Indonesia) P Jordan (Indonesia) V Marissa	11	16

Quarterfinals
1	(China) Xu C (China) Ma J	21	13	18
7	(Indonesia) M Rijal (Indonesia) D Susanto	16	21	21
(Indonesia) F Kurniawan (Indonesia) S P Irawati	15	22	16
5	(China) Zhang N (China) Zhao YL	21	20	21

Semifinals
7	(Indonesia) M Rijal (Indonesia) D Susanto	17	16
5	(China) Zhang N (China) Zhao YL	21	21

=== Bottom half ===
First Round
(Malaysia) Ong J G (Malaysia) Lim Y L	21	21
Q1	(India) A Dewalkar (India) P Gadre	8	13
Q2	(Hong Kong) Chan Y L (Hong Kong) Tse Y S	21	8	18
6	(Thailand) S Prapakamol (Thailand) S Thoungthongkam	14	21	21
(South Korea) Shin B-c (South Korea) Jang Y-n	21	21
(Indonesia) R Widianto (Indonesia) R P Dili	15	14
(Indonesia) M Kido (Indonesia) P Z Bernadeth	12	21	23
4	(Denmark) J Fischer Nielsen (Denmark) C Pedersen	21	19	21
(India) V Diju (India) J Gutta	21	21
(Germany) P Käsbauer (Germany) I Herttrich	9	17
(United States) P Chew (United States) J Subandhi	17	4
8	(Poland) R Mateusiak (Poland) N Zieba	21	21
(Japan) K Hayakawa (Japan) M Matsutomo	21	19	15
(South Korea) Kim K-j (South Korea) Jung K-e	13	21	21
(Germany) M Fuchs (Germany) B Michels	10	15
2	(Indonesia) T Ahmad (Indonesia) L Natsir	21	21

Second Round
(Malaysia) Ong J G (Malaysia) Lim Y L	14	13
6	(Thailand) S Prapakamol (Thailand) S Thoungthongkam	21	21
(South Korea) Shin B-c (South Korea) Jang Y-n	11	18
(Indonesia) M Kido (Indonesia) P Z Bernadeth	21	21
(India) V Diju (India) J Gutta	17	16
8	(Poland) R Mateusiak (Poland) N Zieba	21	21
(South Korea) Kim K-j (South Korea) Jung K-e	5	11
2	(Indonesia) T Ahmad (Indonesia) L Natsir	21	21

Quarterfinals
6	(Thailand) S Prapakamol (Thailand) S Thoungthongkam	21	20	20
(Indonesia) M Kido (Indonesia) P Z Bernadeth	18	22	22
8	(Poland) R Mateusiak (Poland) N Zieba	21	14	18
2	(Indonesia) T Ahmad (Indonesia) L Natsir	12	21	21

Semifinals
(Indonesia) M Kido (Indonesia) P Bernadeth	21	15	19
2	(Indonesia) T Ahmad (Indonesia) L Natsir	18	21	21

=== Finals ===
Semifinals
7	(Indonesia) Muhammad Rijal (Indonesia) Debby Susanto	17	16
5	(China) Zhang Nan (China) Zhao Yunlei	21	21
(Indonesia) Markis Kido (Indonesia) Pia Zebadiah Bernadeth	21	15	19
2	(Indonesia) Tantowi Ahmad (Indonesia) Lilyana Natsir	18	21	21

Final
5	(China) Zhang Nan (China) Zhao Yunlei	13	17
2	(Indonesia) Tantowi Ahmad (Indonesia) Lilyana Natsir	21	21

Preceded by 2013 Malaysia Super Series	BWF Super Series; 2013 season	Succeeded by 2013 India Super Series
