= 2015 All England Super Series Premier =

Badminton championships

Tournament details
- Dates: 3–8 March
- Edition: 105th
- Level: Super Series Premier
- Total prize money: US$500,000
- Venue: Barclaycard Arena
- Location: Birmingham, England

Champions
- Men's singles: (China) Chen Long
- Women's singles: (Spain) Carolina Marín
- Men's doubles: (Denmark) Mathias Boe (Denmark) Carsten Mogensen
- Women's doubles: (China) Bao Yixin (China) Tang Yuanting
- Mixed doubles: (China) Zhang Nan (China) Zhao Yunlei

The 2015 All England Super Series Premier was the first super series tournament of the 2015 BWF Super Series. The tournament took place in Birmingham, England from 3 to 8 March 2015 and had a total purse of $500,000. A qualification draw occurred to fill four places in all five disciplines of the main draws.

== Men's singles ==
=== Seeds ===
1. (China) Chen Long (Champion)
2. (Denmark) Jan Ø. Jørgensen (Final)
3. (South Korea) Son Wan-ho (1st round)
4. (India) Srikanth Kidambi (1st round)
5. (China) Lin Dan (Semi-final)
6. (Chinese Taipei) Chou Tien-chen (Quarterfinal)
7. (Denmark) Hans-Kristian Vittinghus (1st round)
8. (Denmark) Viktor Axelsen (Quarterfinal)

=== Top half ===
First round
1	(China) Chen L	12	21	21
Q3	(China) Xue S	21	18	9
(Chinese Taipei) Hsu J-h	21	18	21
(Thailand) T Saensomboonsuk	18	21	9
6	(Chinese Taipei) Chou T-c	21	21
(India) K Parupalli	13	12
(Japan) T Ueda	21	21
(China) Wang ZM	12	15
4	(India) Srikanth K.	18	21	15
(Japan) K Momota	21	12	21
(South Korea) Lee D-k	17	21	19
(Germany) M Zwiebler	21	19	21
5	(China) Lin D	21	12	21
(Hong Kong) Wei N	14	21	16
Q2	(India) A Jayaram	14	21	14
(China) Tian HW	21	19	21

Second round
1	(China) Chen L	21	21
(Chinese Taipei) Hsu J-h	7	9
6	(Chinese Taipei) Chou T-c	14	21	21
(Japan) T Ueda	21	9	17
(Japan) K Momota	9	21	21
(Germany) M Zwiebler	21	15	16
5	(China) Lin D	21	21
(China) Tian HW	15	19

Quarter-finals
1	(China) Chen L	21	21
6	(Chinese Taipei) Chou T-c	11	11
(Japan) K Momota	18	19
5	(China) Lin D	21	21

Semi-finals
1	(China) Chen L	21	21
5	(China) Lin D	13	12

=== Bottom half ===
First round
(Indonesia) T Sugiarto	12	12
Q1	(Indonesia) D Rumbaka	21	21
(Japan) S Sasaki	13	21	21
7	(Denmark) H-K Vittinghus	21	15	16
(India) Prannoy H.S.	16	21	21
(France) B Leverdez	21	8	18
(England) R Ouseph	21	18	21
3	(South Korea) Son W-h	16	21	19
(Republic of Ireland) S Evans	20	21	21
(Hong Kong) Hu Y	22	18	17
(Hong Kong) Wong W K	16	17
8	(Denmark) V Axelsen	21	21
Q4	(Thailand) B Ponsana	21	21
(Japan) K Tago	19	16
(Hong Kong) Ng K L	20	11
2	(Denmark) J Ø Jørgensen	22	21

Second round
Q1	(Indonesia) D Rumbaka	21	14	18
(Japan) S Sasaki	18	21	21
(India) Prannoy H.S.	21	19	18
(England) R Ouseph	17	21	21
(Republic of Ireland) S Evans	8	7
8	(Denmark) V Axelsen	21	21
Q4	(Thailand) B Ponsana	26	15
2	(Denmark) J Ø Jørgensen	28	21

Quarter-finals
(Japan) S Sasaki	21	21
(England) R Ouseph	14	11
8	(Denmark) V Axelsen	22	14
2	(Denmark) J Ø Jørgensen	24	21

Semi-finals
(Japan) S Sasaki	11	12
2	(Denmark) J Ø Jørgensen	21	21

=== Finals ===
Semi-finals
1	(China) Chen Long	21	21
5	(China) Lin Dan	13	12
(Japan) Sho Sasaki	11	12
2	(Denmark) Jan Ø. Jørgensen	21	21

Final
1	(China) Chen Long	15	21	21
2	(Denmark) Jan Ø. Jørgensen	21	17	15

== Women's singles ==
=== Seeds ===
1. (China) Li Xuerui (2nd round)
2. (China) Wang Shixian (Quarterfinal)
3. (India) Saina Nehwal (Final)
4. (South Korea) Sung Ji-hyun (Quarterfinal)
5. (China) Wang Yihan (Quarterfinal)
6. (Spain) Carolina Marín (Champion)
7. (Chinese Taipei) Tai Tzu-ying (Semi-final)
8. (Thailand) Ratchanok Intanon (Quarterfinal)

=== Top half ===
First round
1	(China) Li XR	21	21
(United States) Zhang BW	13	17
(China) Sun Y	21	16	21
(Thailand) N Jindapon	9	21	17
8	(Thailand) R Intanon	21	21
(Japan) A Yamaguchi	7	16
(China) Liu X	17	20
(Germany) K Schnaase	21	22
3	(India) S Nehwal	21	21
Q4	(Indonesia) B Manuputty	8	12
Q1	(South Korea) Kim H-m	21	21
Q3	(Japan) Y Hashimoto	15	16
5	(China) Wang YH	21	7	21
(Japan) N Okuhara	15	21	19
(Bulgaria) L Zetchiri	8	11
(Japan) M Mitani	21	21

Second round
1	(China) Li XR	13	13
(China) Sun Y	21	21
8	(Thailand) R Intanon	21	21
(Germany) K Schnaase	10	8
3	(India) S Nehwal	21	21
Q1	(South Korea) Kim H-m	15	15
5	(China) Wang YH	21	21	21
(Japan) M Mitani	23	6	16

Quarter-finals
(China) Sun Y	11	21	19
8	(Thailand) R Intanon	21	19	13^{r}
3	(India) S Nehwal	21	21
5	(China) Wang YH	19	6

Semi-finals
(China) Sun Y	13	13
3	(India) S Nehwal	21	21

=== Bottom half ===
First round
(Thailand) P Buranaprasertsuk	21	21
(Indonesia) L Fanetri	16	11
(Republic of Ireland) C Magee	14	21	11
6	(Spain) C Marín	21	15	21
(Chinese Taipei) Pai Y-p	7	21	11
(Thailand) B Ongbumrungpan	21	19	21
Q2	(England) F M Chapman	7	15
4	(South Korea) Sung J-h	21	21
(Canada) M Li	14	21	20
(Chinese Taipei) Hsu Y-c	21	14	22
(Scotland) K Gilmour	16	14
7	(Chinese Taipei) Tai T-y	21	21
(South Korea) Bae Y-j	21	21
(Hong Kong) Yip P Y	13	13
(Denmark) L Kjaersfeldt	17	3
2	(China) Wang SX	21	21

Second round
(Thailand) P Buranaprasertsuk	10	16
6	(Spain) C Marín	21	21
(Thailand) B Ongbumrungpan	14	22	13
4	(South Korea) Sung J-h	21	20	21
(Chinese Taipei) Hsu Y-c	12	13
7	(Chinese Taipei) Tai T-y	21	21
(South Korea) Bae Y-j	12	21	9
2	(China) Wang SX	21	13	21

Quarter-finals
6	(Spain) C Marín	21	22
4	(South Korea) Sung J-h	18	20
7	(Chinese Taipei) Tai T-y	21	9	21
2	(China) Wang SX	18	21	19

Semi-finals
6	(Spain) C Marín	21	21
7	(Chinese Taipei) Tai T-y	18	11

=== Finals ===
Semi-finals
(China) Sun Yu	13	13
3	(India) Saina Nehwal	21	21
6	(Spain) Carolina Marín	21	21
7	(Chinese Taipei) Tai Tzu-ying	18	11

Final
3	(India) Saina Nehwal	21	14	7
6	(Spain) Carolina Marín	16	21	21

== Men's doubles ==
=== Seeds ===
1. (South Korea) Lee Yong-dae / Yoo Yeon-seong
2. (Denmark) Mathias Boe / Carsten Mogensen
3. (Chinese Taipei) Lee Sheng-mu / Tsai Chia-hsin
4. (Indonesia) Mohammad Ahsan / Hendra Setiawan
5. (Japan) Hiroyuki Endo / Kenichi Hayakawa
6. (South Korea) Kim Ki-jung / Kim Sa-rang
7. (China) Chai Biao / Hong Wei
8. (China) Liu Xiaolong / Qiu Zihan

=== Top half ===
First round
1	(South Korea) Lee Y-d (South Korea) Yoo Y-s	16	19
(Denmark) M Conrad-Petersen (Denmark) M Pieler Kolding	21	21
Q1	(Germany) F Holzer (Germany) M Lamsfuss	13	14
(Malaysia) Goh V S (Malaysia) Tan W K	21	21
7	(China) Chai B (China) Hong W	21	17	17
(India) M Attri (India) S Reddy B	9	21	21
(Indonesia) M F Gideon (Indonesia) K S Sukamuljo	21	21
(Germany) M Schwenger (Germany) J Zurwonne	16	17
4	(Indonesia) M Ahsan (Indonesia) H Setiwan	21	21
Q4	(England) A Ellis (England) P Mills	9	17
(China) Fu HF (China) Zhang N	21	21
(England) M Nottingham (England) H Towler	11	18
8	(China) Liu XL (China) Qiu ZH	21	21
Q2	(Indonesia) M Kido (Indonesia) A P R Putra	16	13
(Poland) L Moren (Poland) W Szkudlarczyk	20	12
(Japan) H Hashimoto (Japan) N Hirata	22	21

Second round
(Denmark) M Conrad-Petersen (Denmark) M Pieler Kolding	21	21
(Malaysia) Goh V S (Malaysia) Tan W K	15	13
(India) M Attri (India) S Reddy B	13	21	15
(Indonesia) M F Gideon (Indonesia) K S Sukamuljo	21	19	21
4	(Indonesia) M Ahsan (Indonesia) H Setiwan	16	21	18
(China) Fu HF (China) Zhang N	21	19	21
8	(China) Liu XL (China) Qiu ZH	21	21
(Japan) H Hashimoto (Japan) N Hirata	15	11

Quarter-finals
(Denmark) M Conrad-Petersen (Denmark) M Pieler Kolding	21	10	21
(Indonesia) M F Gideon (Indonesia) K S Sukamuljo	11	21	13
(China) Fu HF (China) Zhang N	22	21	21
8	(China) Liu XL (China) Qiu ZH	24	14	11

Semi-finals
(Denmark) M Conrad-Petersen (Denmark) M Pieler Kolding	15	9
(China) Fu HF (China) Zhang N	21	21

=== Bottom half ===
First round
(Poland) A Cwalina (Poland) P Wacha	13	17
Q3	(Chinese Taipei) Chen H-l (Chinese Taipei) Wang C-l	21	21
(Denmark) A Skaarup Rasmussen (Denmark) K Astrup Sorensen	6	21	17
5	(Japan) H Endo (Japan) K Hayakawa	21	18	21
(South Korea) Choi S-k (South Korea) Ko S-h	20	21	15
(Indonesia) A Adistia (Indonesia) H A Gunawan	22	19	21
(Germany) M Fuchs (Germany) J Schöttler	4^{r}
3	(Chinese Taipei) Lee S-m (Chinese Taipei) Tsai C-h	14
(Japan) T Kamura (Japan) K Sonoda	21	21
(Indonesia) W Nayaka (Indonesia) A Yusuf	18	12
(United States) P Chew (United States) S Pongnairat	6	13
6	(South Korea) Kim K-j (South Korea) Kim S-r	21	21
(Indonesia) A Pratama (Indonesia) R K Suwardi	18	21	21
(China) Cai Y (China) Lu K	21	17	14
(Russia) V Ivanov (Russia) I Sozonov	19	18
2	(Denmark) M Boe (Denmark) C Mogensen	21	21

Second round
Q3	(Chinese Taipei) Chen H-l (Chinese Taipei) Wang C-l	14	16
5	(Japan) H Endo (Japan) K Hayakawa	21	21
(Indonesia) A Adistia (Indonesia) H A Gunawan	11	11
3	(Chinese Taipei) Lee S-m (Chinese Taipei) Tsai C-h	21	21
(Japan) T Kamura (Japan) K Sonoda	21	21
6	(South Korea) Kim K-j (South Korea) Kim S-r	14	19
(Indonesia) A Pratama (Indonesia) R K Suwardi	17	14
2	(Denmark) M Boe (Denmark) C Mogensen	21	21

Quarter-finals
5	(Japan) H Endo (Japan) K Hayakawa	21	21
3	(Chinese Taipei) Lee S-m (Chinese Taipei) Tsai C-h	15	16
(Japan) T Kamura (Japan) K Sonoda	21	18	19
2	(Denmark) M Boe (Denmark) C Mogensen	19	21	21

Semi-finals
5	(Japan) H Endo (Japan) K Hayakawa	21	17	16
2	(Denmark) M Boe (Denmark) C Mogensen	13	21	21

=== Finals ===
Semi-finals
(Denmark) Mads Conrad-Petersen (Denmark) Mads Pieler Kolding	15	9
(China) Fu Haifeng (China) Zhang Nan	21	21
5	(Japan) Hiroyuki Endo (Japan) Kenichi Hayakawa	21	17	16
2	(Denmark) Mathias Boe (Denmark) Carsten Mogensen	13	21	21

Final
(China) Fu Haifeng (China) Zhang Nan	17	20
2	(Denmark) Mathias Boe (Denmark) Carsten Mogensen	21	22

== Women's doubles ==
=== Seeds ===
1. (China) Tian Qing / Zhao Yunlei
2. (Japan) Misaki Matsutomo / Ayaka Takahashi
3. (China) Luo Ying / Luo Yu
4. (Denmark) Christinna Pedersen / Kamilla Rytter Juhl
5. (China) Wang Xiaoli / Yu Yang
6. (Japan) Reika Kakiiwa / Miyuki Maeda
7. (Indonesia) Nitya Krishinda Maheswari / Greysia Polii
8. (China) Bao Yixin / Tang Yuanting

=== Top half ===
First round
1	(China) Tian Q (China) Zhao YL	21	19	21
(South Korea) Lee S-h (South Korea) Shin S-c	13	21	5
(Malaysia) A A Anscelly (Malaysia) Soong F C	12	22	14
(India) J Gutta (India) A Ponnappa	21	20	21
6	(Japan) R Kakiiwa (Japan) M Maeda	15	21	21
(Malaysia) V Hoo K M (Malaysia) Woon KW	21	11	16
Q4	(Germany) I Herttrich (Germany) B Michels	21	21
Q1	(Indonesia) D Fitriani (Indonesia) N Melati	18	17
3	(China) Luo Y (China) Luo Y	21	21
(Thailand) P Supajirakul (Thailand) S Taerattanachai	17	12
(Japan) N Fukuman (Japan) K Yonao	21	18	21
Q2	(Indonesia) S R Andini (Indonesia) M D Giovani	10	21	17
5	(China) Wang XL (China) Yu Y	21	14	21
(South Korea) Jang Y-n (South Korea) Jung K-e	19	21	14
(Bulgaria) G Stoeva (Bulgaria) S Stoeva	23	19	21
(Netherlands) S Barning (Netherlands) I Tabeling	21	21	14

Second round
1	(China) Tian Q (China) Zhao YL	21	21
(India) J Gutta (India) A Ponnappa	10	13
6	(Japan) R Kakiiwa (Japan) M Maeda	21	21
Q4	(Germany) I Herttrich (Germany) B Michels	8	9
3	(China) Luo Y (China) Luo Y	16	21	21
(Japan) N Fukuman (Japan) K Yonao	21	13	15
5	(China) Wang XL (China) Yu Y	21	21
(Bulgaria) G Stoeva (Bulgaria) S Stoeva	8	15

Quarter-finals
1	(China) Tian Q (China) Zhao YL	16	21	21
6	(Japan) R Kakiiwa (Japan) M Maeda	21	12	9
3	(China) Luo Y (China) Luo Y	19	14
5	(China) Wang XL (China) Yu Y	21	21

Semi-finals
1	(China) Tian Q (China) Zhao YL	14	12
5	(China) Wang XL (China) Yu Y	21	21

=== Bottom half ===
First round
(Netherlands) E Muskens (Netherlands) S Piek	15	21
(Hong Kong) Chan T K (Hong Kong) Tse Y S	21	23
(England) S Brown (England) K Robertshaw	13	14
8	(China) Bao YX (China) Tang YT	21	21
Q3	(Denmark) L Grebak (Denmark) M Helsbol	9	21	6
(South Korea) Go A-r (South Korea) Yoo H-w	21	16	21
(Russia) E Bolotova (Russia) E Kosetskaya	16	13
4	(Denmark) C Pedersen (Denmark) K Rytter Juhl	21	21
(South Korea) Chae Y-j (South Korea) Kim S-y	21	21
(Russia) A Chervaykova (Russia) N Vislova	9	13
(Germany) J Goliszewski (Germany) C Nelte	19	10
7	(Indonesia) N K Maheswari (Indonesia) G Polii	21	21
(United States) E Lee (United States) P L Obanana	21	21
(Indonesia) P Z Bernadeth (Indonesia) R A Pradipta	15	18
(China) Tang JH (China) Zhong QX	21	21
2	(Japan) M Matsutomo (Japan) A Takahashi	14	18

Second round
(Hong Kong) Chan T K (Hong Kong) Tse Y S	9	17
8	(China) Bao YX (China) Tang YT	21	21
(South Korea) Go A-r (South Korea) Yoo H-w	15	18
4	(Denmark) C Pedersen (Denmark) K Rytter Juhl	21	21
(South Korea) Chae Y-j (South Korea) Kim S-y	17	19
7	(Indonesia) N K Maheswari (Indonesia) G Polii	21	21
(United States) E Lee (United States) P L Obanana	9	12
(China) Tang JH (China) Zhong QX	21	21

Quarter-finals
8	(China) Bao YX (China) Tang YT	24	21	21
4	(Denmark) C Pedersen (Denmark) K Rytter Juhl	26	12	10
7	(Indonesia) N K Maheswari (Indonesia) G Polii	19	21	11
(China) Tang JH (China) Zhong QX	21	13	21

Semi-finals
8	(China) Bao YX (China) Tang YT	21	21
(China) Tang JH (China) Zhong QX	10	14

=== Finals ===
Semi-finals
1	(China) Tian Qing (China) Zhao Yunlei	14	12
5	(China) Wang Xiaoli (China) Yu Yang	21	21
8	(China) Bao Yixin (China) Tang Yuanting	21	21
(China) Tang Jinhua (China) Zhong Qianxin	10	14

Final
5	(China) Wang Xiaoli (China) Yu Yang	14	14
8	(China) Bao Yixin (China) Tang Yuanting	21	21

== Mixed doubles ==
=== Seeds ===
1. (China) Zhang Nan / Zhao Yunlei
2. (Denmark) Joachim Fischer Nielsen / Christinna Pedersen
3. (China) Xu Chen / Ma Jin
4. (Indonesia) Tantowi Ahmad / Lilyana Natsir
5. (South Korea) Ko Sung-hyun / Kim Ha-na
6. (England) Chris Adcock / Gabrielle Adcock
7. (China) Liu Cheng / Bao Yixin
8. (Indonesia) Riky Widianto / Richi Puspita Dili

=== Top half ===
First round
1	(China) Zhang N (China) Zhao YL	21	21
Q1	(England) C Coles (England) S Brown	13	13
(South Korea) Kim K-j (South Korea) Shin S-c	19	21	19
(Malaysia) Tan A Q (Malaysia) Lai P J	21	19	21
5	(South Korea) Ko S-h (South Korea) Kim H-n	23	21
(Germany) M Schwenger (Germany) C Nelte	21	15
(Thailand) S Prakamol (Thailand) S Thoungthongkam	21	14	21
(Hong Kong) Lee C H (Hong Kong) Chau H W	13	21	23
3	(China) Xu C (China) Ma J	15	14
(Indonesia) P Jordan (Indonesia) D Susanto	21	21
(Hong Kong) Chan Y L (Hong Kong) Tse Y S	21	21
(France) G Mittelheisser (France) A Fontaine	18	15
8	(Indonesia) R Widianto (Indonesia) R P Dili	19	13
(Japan) K Hayakawa (Japan) M Matsutomo	21	21
(Canada) T Ng (Canada) A Bruce	11	9
(Denmark) M Pieler Kolding (Denmark) K Rytter Juhl	21	21

Second round
1	(China) Zhang N (China) Zhao YL	21	21
(Malaysia) Tan A Q (Malaysia) Lai P J	13	14
5	(South Korea) Ko S-h (South Korea) Kim H-n	15	21	21
(Hong Kong) Lee C H (Hong Kong) Chau H W	21	13	14
(Indonesia) P Jordan (Indonesia) D Susanto	15	21	21
(Hong Kong) Chan Y L (Hong Kong) Tse Y S	21	16	15
(Japan) K Hayakawa (Japan) M Matsutomo	17	11
(Denmark) M Pieler Kolding (Denmark) K Rytter Juhl	21	21

Quarter-finals
1	(China) Zhang N (China) Zhao YL	21	25
5	(South Korea) Ko S-h (South Korea) Kim H-n	19	23
(Indonesia) P Jordan (Indonesia) D Susanto	20	21	21
(Denmark) M Pieler Kolding (Denmark) K Rytter Juhl	22	19	14

Semi-finals
1	(China) Zhang N (China) Zhao YL	21	21
(Indonesia) P Jordan (Indonesia) D Susanto	15	10

=== Bottom half ===
First round
(Russia) V Durkin (Russia) N Vislova	17	21	17
Q3	(Indonesia) K S Sukamuljo (Indonesia) G Polii	21	18	21
(Indonesia) M Kido (Indonesia) P Z Bernadeth	15	8
6	(England) C Adcock (England) G Adcock	21	21
Q4	(South Korea) Choi S-k (South Korea) Chae Y-j	21	15	21
(Indonesia) E Subaktiar (Indonesia) G E Widjaja	14	21	16
(Republic of Ireland) S Magee (Republic of Ireland) C Magee	12	13
4	(Indonesia) T Ahmad (Indonesia) L Natsir	21	21
Q2	(Denmark) M Christiansen (Denmark) L Grebak	15	14
(China) Lu K (China) Huang YQ	21	21
(Germany) P Käsbauer (Germany) I Herttrich	12	20
7	(China) Liu C (China) Bao YX	21	22
(United States) P Chew (United States) J Subandhi	10	17
(Netherlands) J De Ruitter (Netherlands) S Barning	21	21
(Netherlands) J Arends (Netherlands) S Piek	19	18
2	(Denmark) J Fischer Nielsen (Denmark) C Pedersen	21	21

Second round
Q3	(Indonesia) K S Sukamuljo (Indonesia) G Polii	12	18
6	(England) C Adcock (England) G Adcock	21	21
Q4	(South Korea) Choi S-k (South Korea) Chae Y-j	12	7
4	(Indonesia) T Ahmad (Indonesia) L Natsir	21	21
(China) Lu K (China) Huang YQ	17	21	21
7	(China) Liu C (China) Bao YX	21	17	19
(Netherlands) J De Ruitter (Netherlands) S Barning	13	15
2	(Denmark) J Fischer Nielsen (Denmark) C Pedersen	21	21

Quarter-finals
6	(England) C Adcock (England) G Adcock	14	21	19
4	(Indonesia) T Ahmad (Indonesia) L Natsir	21	18	21
(China) Lu K (China) Huang YQ	17	15
2	(Denmark) J Fischer Nielsen (Denmark) C Pedersen	21	21

Semi-finals
4	(Indonesia) T Ahmad (Indonesia) L Natsir	21	21
2	(Denmark) J Fischer Nielsen (Denmark) C Pedersen	17	11

=== Finals ===
Semi-finals
1	(China) Zhang Nan (China) Zhao Yunlei	21	21
(Indonesia) Praveen Jordan (Indonesia) Debby Susanto	15	10
4	(Indonesia) Tontowi Ahmad (Indonesia) Lilyana Natsir	21	21
2	(Denmark) Joachim Fischer Nielsen (Denmark) Christinna Pedersen	17	11

Final
1	(China) Zhang Nan (China) Zhao Yunlei	21	21
4	(Indonesia) Tontowi Ahmad (Indonesia) Lilyana Natsir	10	10

Preceded by 2014 BWF Super Series Masters Finals	BWF Super Series; 2015 BWF Season	Succeeded by 2015 India Super Series
