= Parupalli Kashyap =

Indian badminton player

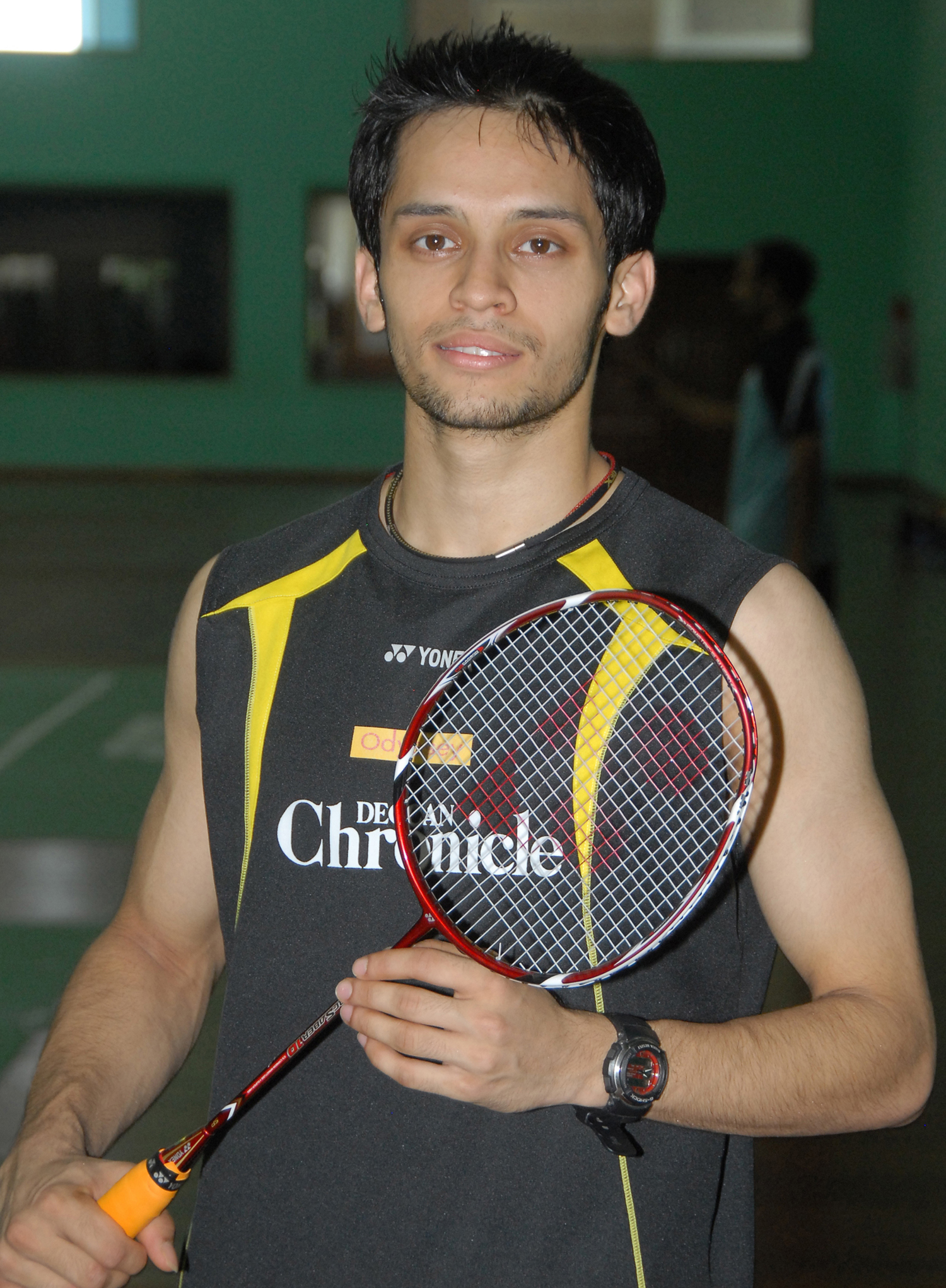
- Kashyap in 2010

Personal information
- Born: 8 September 1986 (age 40) Hyderabad, India
- Height: 1.73 m (5 ft 8 in)
- Weight: 65 kg (143 lb)
- Spouse: Saina Nehwal (m. 2018)

Sport
- Country: India
- Sport: Badminton
- Handedness: Right
- Coached by: Pullela Gopichand

Men's singles
- Career record: 305 wins, 245 losses
- Highest ranking: 6 (25 April 2013)
- Honours: Arjuna Award
- BWF profile
Medal record
Men's badminton
Representing India
Commonwealth Games
Gold medal – first place	2014 Glasgow	Men's singles
Silver medal – second place	2010 New Delhi	Mixed team
Bronze medal – third place	2010 New Delhi	Men's singles
Asia Team Championships
Bronze medal – third place	2016 Hyderabad	Men's team

Parupalli Kashyap (born 8 September 1986) is an Indian former badminton player who has represented India at the Olympics, World Championships, Commonwealth Games, Asian Games and other major international tournaments. He is best known for reaching the quarterfinals at the 2012 London Olympics, becoming the first Indian male shuttler to achieve this feat. A former World No. 6, he is now a coach at the Gopichand Badminton Academy. Kashyap announced his retirement from professional badminton in 2024.

== Early life ==
Born to Uday Shankar and Subhadra of Guntur, as an 11-year-old, Kashyap Parupalli first enrolled with a training camp conducted by S. M. Arif in Hyderabad, India. Because his father had a transferable job, their family kept moving frequently. While in Bangalore, he joined the Padukone Academy. In 2004, they moved back to Hyderabad. Soon after, Kashyap was diagnosed with asthma after a few medical tests. Kashyap felt that his stay in Bangalore during 2000–03 might have aggravated the condition. Though the diagnosis came as a shock to him and he thought that his playing career was finished, he put in a lot of effort with determination to overcome the problem. Using appropriate medication, his condition began to improve dramatically. He continued his training at the Gopichand Academy under Pullela Gopichand, a former All England Open champion.

== Education ==
His early education was at Loyola High School, Secunderabad, a city known for breeding both tech talent and sporting prodigies. But unlike many sportspersons who forgo formal education early on, Kashyap took a different route. He went on to pursue a degree in Computer Science from the University of Petroleum and Energy Studies (UPES), Dehradun.

== Personal life ==
He married Indian badminton player, Saina Nehwal in a private ceremony on 14 December 2018. Parupalli Kashyap and Saina Nehwal announced their separation in July 2025. However, on 2 August 2025, Nehwal shared on Instagram that the couple was "trying again" and working on their relationship.

== Career ==
=== 2005–2009 ===
In 2005, Kashyap represented Andhra Pradesh and won the a boys' singles title at the National Junior Open Badminton Championships. From 2006 onwards, he started to appear at international tournaments. In that year's Hong Kong Open, he caused an upset by defeating the then world number 19 Przemysław Wacha in the pre-quarterfinals; he lost the next round though. A few months later, he defeated Wacha again at the Bitburger Open to reach the semifinals. In 2006, his world ranking improved from outside the 100 to 64. Coach Gopichand was happy at the win and felt that it was a good sign that Kashyap was winning his important matches against higher-ranked players. In the same year, Kashyap was chosen to represent India at the 2006 Asian Games. At the 33rd National Games, Kashyap defeated the then National champion Chetan Anand to win a gold medal for Andhra Pradesh. Between 2006–07, Kashyap won a few national tournaments as well.

In 2009, Kashyap was a semifinalist at the Dutch Open and the 2009 Senior National Badminton Championships. In the same year, he was the runners-up at the Thailand International, Spanish Open and Toulouse Open. At the 2009 Singapore Super Series, Kashyap was the semifinalist.

=== 2010 Commonwealth Games ===
At the 2010 Commonwealth Games, he reached the semifinals stage but lost to Rajiv Ouseph of England. He won the bronze medal against chetan Anand. He also played a crucial role in India winning a silver medal in the Team Event of 2010 Commonwealth Games

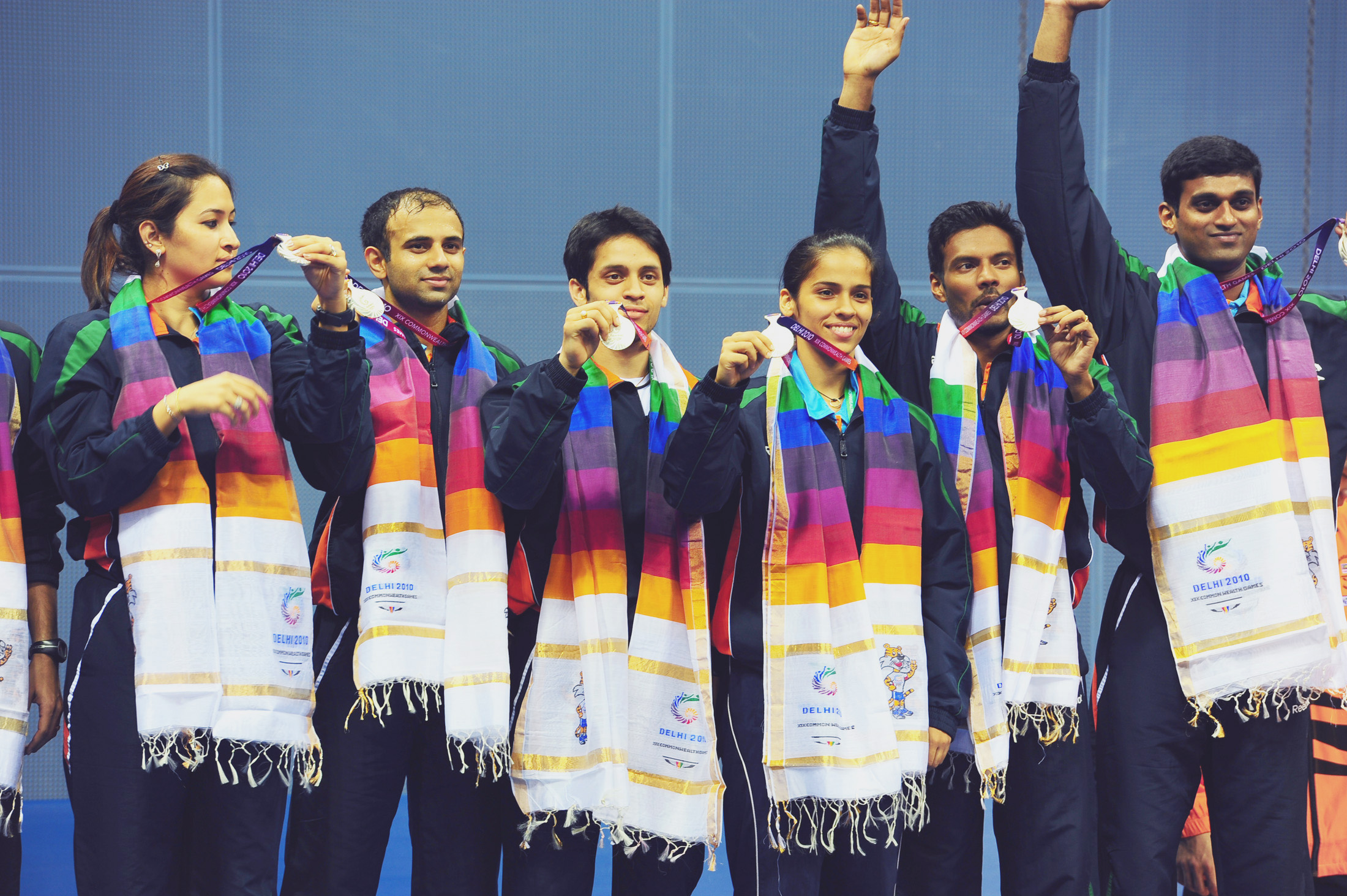
Kashyap (centre) with his future wife Saina Nehwal (right) at the presentation ceremony, Commonwealth Games-2010

He also reached the semi-finals at the 2010 Indian Open Grand Prix Gold where he lost out to compatriot Gurusai Datt. He lost out to Arvind Bhat in the finals of the 75th Senior National Badminton Championship held at Rohtak in 2011.

Kashyap reached the semifinal stage of 2012 Djaram Indonesia Open in the men's singles competition, where he eventually lost. En route to the semifinals, he upset world number 3 Chen Long and world number 16 Hans-Kristian Vittinghus.

=== 2012 Summer Olympics ===
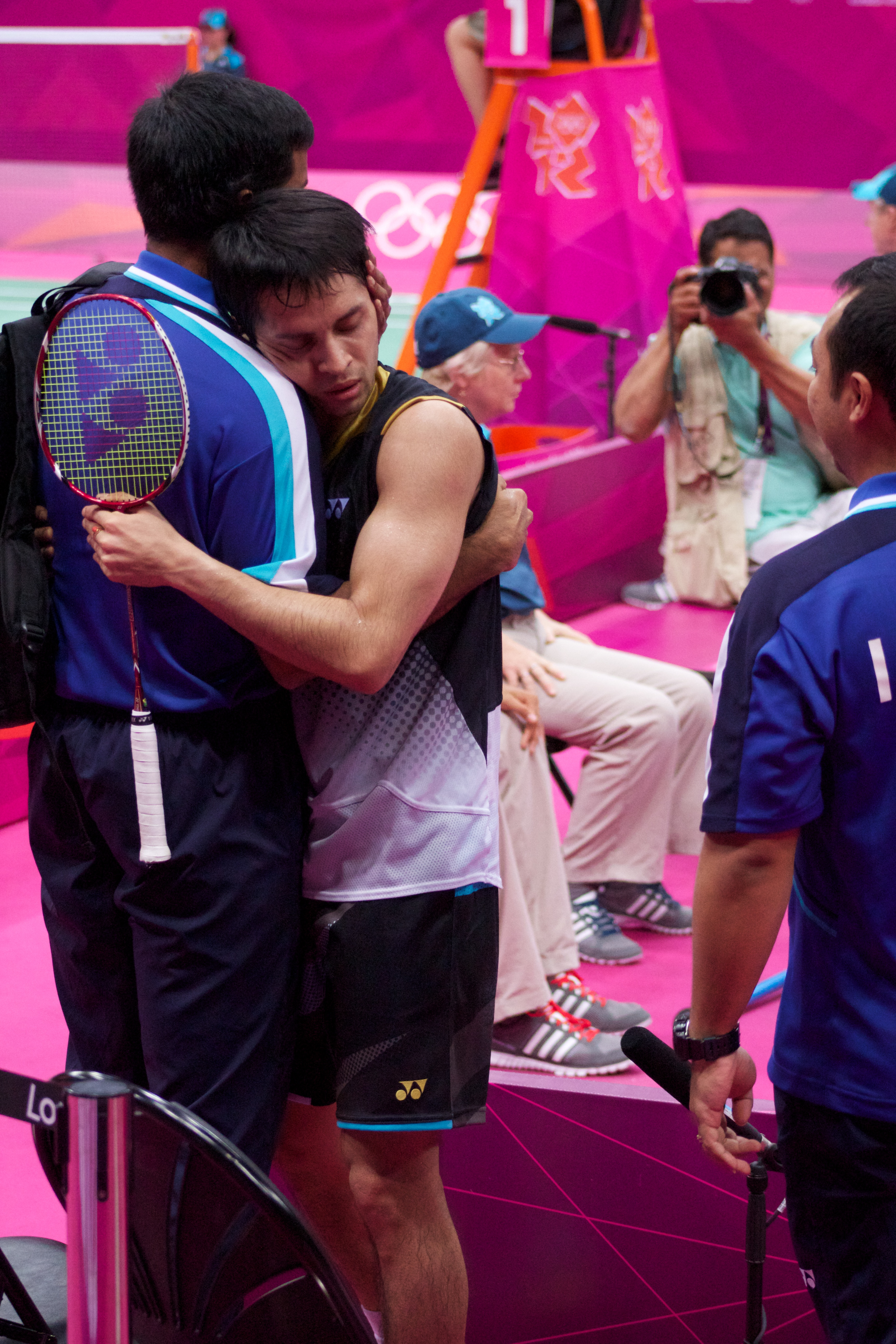
Kashyap and his coach Pullela Gopichand at the 2012 Summer Olympics

At the 2012 Summer Olympics, Kashyap surprised one and all by winning all his matches at the group stage, which involved the shocking defeat of Nguyễn Tiến Minh. In the Pre-quarters he defeated Niluka Karunaratne of Sri Lanka by 21–16, 15–21, 21–14. In the Quarterfinals, it was disappointment as a dejected looking Kashyap was escorted out of the court after his loss to top seed Lee Chong Wei in straight sets. In the process, he created history by becoming the only Indian to reach the Quarterfinal stages in the Olympics in Men's Singles. This achievement led him to 19th rank.

Later his victory in the Indian Open Grand Prix Gold 2012 led him to a career best ranking of 14. His success in Korea in 2013 led his rank up to 10.On 31 January 2013 he achieved a ranking of 9. He reached the quarterfinals in the Swiss open which led him to a ranking of 7 as per the rankings provided by BWF on 14 March. He moved up to a career best ranking of 6 after his first round match against Taufik Hidayat of Indonesia.

=== 2014 ===
Recovering from a couple of "freak injuries", Kashyap started the year winning the first round match against Germany's Marc Zwiebler in Malaysia Open but he lost in the very next round to the number 3 seed Jan O Jorgensen. In the Indian Open Grand Prix gold Tournament also his performance was not very satisfactory as the defending champion lost in the quarterfinals to Zulfadli Zulkiffli. Kashyap's ranking was declining steadily until he reached the Semifinal stages of the 2014 Swiss Open Grand Prix Gold.

One of the biggest victories for Kashyap came in the 2014 India Super Series when he beat the Chinese world number 6 Wang Zhengming, 12–21 21–17 12–21. He extended Indian hopes till the Quarterfinals where he lost out to top seed Lee Chong Wei. The 2014 Commonwealth Games was a halt to a steady decline in form for Kashyap as he lost almost all the subsequent matches after his home tournament. But there was more disappointment waiting for Kashyap as he lost in the very first round of 2014 BWF World Championships to Dieter Domke. Even in Asian Games 2014 he was a huge disappointment as he lost in the second round. He was widely criticized for not showing good fighting spirit in his second round match against top seed Lee Chong Wei which was quite uncharacteristic of Kashyap.

Despite all these disappointing losses, Kashyap managed to return to form in the 2014 Denmark Super Series Premier where he reached the semifinal stages. En route to the Semifinals, he upset world number 3 Jan Ø. Jørgensen his second win against the Dane. In the very next tournament that he played, he beat world number 4, Kenichi Tago and world number 9, Tian Houwei in consecutive rounds thus reaching the quarterfinals of 2014 French Super Series. He continued his great form in the 2014 China Open Super Series Premier where he reached the Quarterfinal stages. Back to back quarterfinal appearances in Superseries Events helped Kashyap to jump up in the Destination Dubai rankings, but unfortunately another first round loss in the 2014 Hong Kong Super Series saw Kashyap drop from 11 in the Destination Dubai ranking to 14.

==== 2014 Commonwealth Games ====
Kashyap was seeded second at the 2014 Commonwealth Games. As expected Kashyap crashed into the Men's Singles finals. His route to the final was not easy. In the Semifinal match against Rajiv Ouseph of England, he played out of his skin to avenge his loss in the 2010 Commonwealth Games semifinal and also in the mixed team event, where India eventually finished in the fourth position. In the finals, in intense three games he defeated Derek Wong of Singapore 21–14, 11–21, 21–19 and thus won a historic gold medal for India. The gold medal in men's singles came after a long wait of 32 years, allowing Kashyap to see his name written amongst two legends of Indian Badminton who were also former gold medalists in the same event, Prakash Padukone in 1978, followed by Syed Modi in 1982.

=== 2015 ===
Kashyap started the year on a disappointing note, losing out to Derek Wong in the pre-quarters of 2015 Malaysia Open Grand Prix Gold. However, at the India Open Grand Prix Gold 2015, Kashyap defeated compatriot Srikanth Kidambi 23–21, 23–21 in an intense final. However, the real challenge of the tournament was from Viktor Axelsen in the semi-finals, where Kashyap was made to sweat before winning the match 18–21, 22–20, 21–7. Kashyap's woes continued in the Superseries events as he lost out in the first round of the 2015 All England Super Series Premier. In his home Superseries event too Kashyap failed to reach the quarterfinals, bowing out to Xue Song of China in straight games in the pre-quarters.

=== 2016 ===
Kashyap failed to qualify for the 2016 Summer Olympics in Rio.

=== 2018 ===
Kashyap failed to get a spot in the team for 2018 Asian Games and Commonwealth Games.

=== 2020–Present ===
Kashyap failed to qualify for the 2020 Olympics, thus missing out on qualifying for 2 consecutive Olympics. He was not selected in the team for the 2021 Sudirman Cup and the 2021 Thomas Cup. He retired 0-3 down to Chou Tien-chen in the 1st round of the 2021 Denmark Open. His run of 1st round exits continued with 1st round exits in the 2021 French Open (badminton), the 2021 Indonesia Masters (losing to Hans-Kristian Vittinghus 10-21, 19-21) and the 2021 Indonesia Open (losing to Loh Kean Yew 11-21, 14-21).

== Achievements ==
=== Commonwealth Games ===
Men's singles

Year	Venue	Opponent	Score	Result
2010	Siri Fort Sports Complex, New Delhi, India	(India) Chetan Anand	21–15, 21–18	Bronze
2014	Emirates Arena, Glasgow, Scotland	(Singapore) Derek Wong	21–14, 11–21, 21–19	Gold

=== BWF World Tour (1 runner-up) ===
The BWF World Tour, which was announced on 19 March 2017 and implemented in 2018, is a series of elite badminton tournaments sanctioned by the Badminton World Federation (BWF). The BWF World Tour is divided into levels of World Tour Finals, Super 1000, Super 750, Super 500, Super 300, and the BWF Tour Super 100.

Men's singles

Year	Tournament	Level	Opponent	Score	Result
2019	Canada Open	Super 100	(China) Li Shifeng	22–20, 14–21, 17–21	(silver) Runner-up

=== BWF Grand Prix (2 titles, 1 runner-up) ===
The BWF Grand Prix had two levels, the Grand Prix and Grand Prix Gold. It was a series of badminton tournaments sanctioned by the Badminton World Federation (BWF) and played between 2007 and 2017.

Men's singles

Year	Tournament	Opponent	Score	Result
2012	India Grand Prix Gold	(Thailand) Tanongsak Saensomboonsuk	21–9, 14–21, 21–17	(gold) Winner
2015	Syed Modi International	(India) Srikanth Kidambi	23–21, 23–21	(gold) Winner
2017	U. S. Open	(India) Prannoy H. S.	15–21, 22–20, 12–21	(silver) Runner-up

BWF Grand Prix Gold tournament
BWF Grand Prix tournament

=== BWF International Challenge/Series (1 title, 3 runners-up) ===
Men's singles

Year	Tournament	Opponent	Score	Result
2009	Smiling Fish International	(Thailand) Tanongsak Saensomboonsuk	21–23, 14–21	(silver) Runner-up
2009	Spanish International	(Denmark) Hans-Kristian Vittinghus	10–21, 16–21	(silver) Runner-up
2009	Le Volant d'Or de Toulouse	(England) Rajiv Ouseph	11–21, 12–21	(silver) Runner-up
2018	Austrian International	(Malaysia) Cheam June Wei	23–21, 21–14	(gold) Winner

BWF International Challenge tournament
BWF International Series tournament

== Performance in Super Series events ==
Year	Tournament	Result
2010	2010 Singapore Super Series	Semi-Final
2014 and 2012	2014 China Open Super Series Premier	Quarterfinal
2014	2014 French Super Series	Quarterfinal
2014	2014 Denmark Super Series Premier	Semi-Final
2013	2013 All England Super Series Premier	Quarterfinal
2012	2012 Indonesia Super Series Premier	Semi-Final
2012, 2019	2012 India Super Series	Semi-Final
2015, 2014 and 2013	Malaysia Open Superseries Premier	Pre-Quarters

== Awards and recognition ==
- Arjuna Award, 2012

For the gold medal at 2014 Commonwealth Games

- ₹2.5 million (US$27,000) cash award by Badminton Association of India.
- ₹5 million (US$53,000) cash award by Telangana government.

== Record against selected opponents ==
Record against year-end Finals finalists, World Championships semi finalists, and Olympic quarter finalists. Accurate as of 29 November 2022.

Player	Matches	Win	Lost	Diff.
(China) Bao Chunlai	3	0	3	–3
(China) Chen Jin	3	0	3	–3
(China) Chen Long	10	2	8	–6
(China) Du Pengyu	2	0	2	–2
(China) Lin Dan	3	0	3	–3
(China) Tian Houwei	3	1	2	–1
(China) Zhao Junpeng	1	1	0	+1
(Chinese Taipei) Chou Tien-chen	7	2	5	–3
(Chinese Taipei) Hsieh Yu-hsing	3	2	1	+1
(Denmark) Anders Antonsen	1	1	0	+1
(Denmark) Viktor Axelsen	4	2	2	0
(Denmark) Peter Gade	5	0	5	–5
(Denmark) Jan Ø. Jørgensen	7	3	4	–1
(Denmark) Hans-Kristian Vittinghus	6	4	2	+2
(England) Rajiv Ouseph	9	5	4	+1
(Guatemala) Kevin Cordón	1	1	0	+1
(India) Srikanth Kidambi	4	2	2	0
(India) Lakshya Sen	1	0	1	–1

Player	Matches	Win	Lost	Diff.
(Indonesia) Anthony Sinisuka Ginting	8	0	8	–8
(Indonesia) Taufik Hidayat	7	0	7	–7
(Indonesia) Sony Dwi Kuncoro	3	0	3	–3
(Indonesia) Marleve Mainaky	1	1	0	+1
(Indonesia) Tommy Sugiarto	8	4	4	0
(Japan) Kento Momota	5	0	5	–5
(Japan) Sho Sasaki	2	0	2	–2
(Malaysia) Lee Chong Wei	7	0	7	–7
(Malaysia) Liew Daren	5	3	2	+1
(Malaysia) Wong Choong Hann	1	0	1	–1
(Singapore) Loh Kean Yew	3	0	3	–3
(South Korea) Lee Hyun-il	6	3	3	0
(South Korea) Park Sung-hwan	2	0	2	–2
(South Korea) Son Wan-ho	9	2	7	–5
(South Korea) Heo Kwang-hee	2	2	0	+2
(Thailand) Boonsak Ponsana	5	4	1	+3
(Thailand) Kunlavut Vitidsarn	2	0	2	–2
(Thailand) Kantaphon Wangcharoen	1	0	1	–1
(Vietnam) Nguyễn Tiến Minh	9	4	5	–1
