= Badminton at the 2013 SEA Games – Men's singles =

These are the results of the men's singles competition in badminton at the 2013 SEA Games in Myanmar.

== Medal winners ==
(gold) Gold	(silver) Silver	(bronze) Bronze
(Thailand) Tanongsak Saensomboonsuk	(Indonesia) Dionysius Hayom Rumbaka	(Indonesia) Wisnu Yuli Prasetyo (Vietnam) Nguyễn Tiến Minh

== Draw ==
First round
1	(Vietnam) Nguyễn Tiến Minh
Bye
(Malaysia) Chong Wei Feng	19	12
(Thailand) Suppanyu Avihingsanon	21	21
(Cambodia) Chanmara Tep	16	10
(Myanmar) Min Aung Kyi	21	21
(Laos) Phaxay Sengchaleun	10	5
(Indonesia) Dionysius Hayom Rumbaka	21	21
(Cambodia) Phorrom Cheng	5	9
(Indonesia) Wisnu Yuli Prasetyo	21	21
(Vietnam) Nguyễn Hoàng Nam	12	10
(Malaysia) Iskandar Zulkarnain Zainuddin	21	21
(Myanmar) Myo Min Tun	21	21
(Laos) Phanthalang Outhaithani	7	8
(Singapore) Derek Wong	9	21	17
2	(Thailand) Tanongsak Saensomboonsuk	21	17	21

Quarterfinals
1	(Vietnam) Nguyễn Tiến Minh	24	11
(Thailand) Suppanyu Avihingsanon	22	7^{r}
(Myanmar) Min Aung Kyi	6	8
(Indonesia) Dionysius Hayom Rumbaka	21	21
(Indonesia) Wisnu Yuli Prasetyo	21	21
(Malaysia) Iskandar Zulkarnain Zainuddin	10	15
(Myanmar) Myo Min Tun	9	13
2	(Thailand) Tanongsak Saensomboonsuk	21	21

Semifinals
1	(Vietnam) Nguyễn Tiến Minh	21	12	20
(Indonesia) Dionysius Hayom Rumbaka	13	21	22
(Indonesia) Wisnu Yuli Prasetyo	21	11	12
2	(Thailand) Tanongsak Saensomboonsuk	17	21	21

Finals
(Indonesia) Dionysius Hayom Rumbaka	20	17
2	(Thailand) Tanongsak Saensomboonsuk	22	21
