= 2013 All England Super Series Premier – Qualification =

Badminton championships

== Men's Single ==
=== Seeds ===
1. (England) Rajiv Ouseph (Not Qualified)
2. (Malaysia) Mohammad Arif Abdul Latif (Not Qualified)
3. (Malaysia) Tan Chun Seang (qualified)
4. (Thailand) Tanongsak Saensomboonsuk (qualified)

=== Qualifiers ===
1. (India) Sourabh Varma
2. (Malaysia) Tan Chun Seang
3. (Thailand) Tanongsak Saensomboonsuk
4. (China) Chen Yuekun

=== Qualifying draw ===
==== First qualifier ====
First round
1	(England) Rajiv Ouseph	20	23	21
(India) Anand Pawar	22	21	7
(India) Sourabh Varma	22	23
(France) Brice Leverdez	20	21

Qualifying Competition
1	(England) Rajiv Ouseph	13	18
(India) Sourabh Varma	21	21

==== Second qualifier ====
First round
3	(Malaysia) Tan Chun Seang	21	15	21
(Germany) Dieter Domke	18	21	15
(Thailand) Suppanyu Avihingsanon	20	15
(Malaysia) Zulfadli Zulkiffli	22	21

Qualifying Competition
3	(Malaysia) Tan Chun Seang	11	21	21
(Malaysia) Zulfadli Zulkiffli	21	14	12

==== Third qualifier ====
First round
(Singapore) Derek Wong Zi Liang	21	17	18
(Ukraine) Dmytro Zavadsky	19	21	21
(India) Gurusai Dutt	17	21	10
4	(Thailand) Tanongsak Saensomboonsuk	21	13	21

Qualifying Competition
(Ukraine) Dmytro Zavadsky	11	7
4	(Thailand) Tanongsak Saensomboonsuk	21	21

==== Fourth qualifier ====
First round
PFR	(Germany) Lukas Schmidt	16	11
(China) Chen Yuekun	21	21
(Republic of Ireland) Scott Evans	21	9	12
2	(Malaysia) Mohammad Arif Abdul Latif	13	21	21

Qualifying Competition
(China) Chen Yuekun	16	21	21
2	(Malaysia) Mohammad Arif Abdul Latif	21	16	14

== Women's Single ==
=== Seeds ===
1. (Japan) Sayaka Takahashi (qualified)
2. (Canada) Michelle Li (qualified)
3. (Scotland) Kirsty Gilmour (Not Qualified)
4. (Bulgaria) Linda Zechiri (Not Qualified)

=== Qualifiers ===
1. (Japan) Sayaka Takahashi
2. (Indonesia) Bellaetrix Manuputty
3. (France) Sashina Vignes Waran
4. (Canada) Michelle Li

=== Qualifying draw ===
==== First qualifier ====
First round
1	(Japan) Sayaka Takahashi	21	21
(Malaysia) Lydia Cheah Li Ya	13	8
(Republic of Ireland) Chloe Magee	17	21	21
(Denmark) Karina Jørgensen	21	15	18

Qualifying Competition
1	(Japan) Sayaka Takahashi	21	21
(Republic of Ireland) Chloe Magee	11	17

==== Second qualifier ====
First round
4	(Bulgaria) Linda Zechiri	WO
(Germany) Karin Schnaase
(Austria) Simone Prutsch	19	14
(Indonesia) Bellaetrix Manuputty	21	21

Qualifying Competition
(Germany) Karin Schnaase	13	11
(Indonesia) Bellaetrix Manuputty	21	21

==== Third qualifier ====
First round
(France) Sashina Vignes Waran	21	11
(Wales) Carissa Turner	14	7^{r}
(Malaysia) Tee Jing Yi	21	14	16
3	(Scotland) Kirsty Gilmour	15	21	21

Qualifying Competition
(France) Sashina Vignes Waran	21	21
3	(Scotland) Kirsty Gilmour	10	17

==== Fourth qualifier ====
First round
(Canada) Nicole Grether	11^{r}
(United States) Jamie Subandhi	14
(New Zealand) Michelle Chan Ky	9	13
2	(Canada) Michelle Li	21	21

Qualifying Competition
(United States) Jamie Subandhi	16	13
2	(Canada) Michelle Li	21	21

== Men's doubles ==
=== Seeds ===
1. (Netherlands) Jorrit de Ruiter / Dave Khodabux (Not Qualified)
2. (India) Tarun Kona / Arun Vishnu (Not Qualified)
3. (South Korea) Kang Ji-wook / Lee Sang-joon (Not Qualified)
4. (Denmark) Christian Skovgård / Mads Pieler Kolding (Not Qualified)

=== Qualifiers ===
1. (Scotland) Robert Blair / (Malaysia) Tan Bin Shen
2. (England) Marcus Ellis / (Scotland) Paul Van Rietvelde
3. (Germany) Peter Käsbauer / Josche Zurwonne
4. (Thailand) Bodin Issara / Pakkawat Vilailak

=== Qualifying draw ===
==== First qualifier ====
First round
1	(Netherlands) Jorrit de Reuter (Netherlands) Dave Khodabux	21	17	18
(Belgium) Mattijs Dierickx (Belgium) Freek Golinski	18	21	21
(Scotland) Robert Blair (Malaysia) Tan Bin Shen	21	15	21
(England) Chris Coles (England) Matthew Nottingham	11	21	9

Qualifying Competition
(Belgium) Mattijs Dierickx (Belgium) Freek Golinski	12	10
(Scotland) Robert Blair (Malaysia) Tan Bin Shen	21	21

==== Second qualifier ====
First round
3	(South Korea) Kang Ji-wook (South Korea) Lee Sang-joon	22	21
(Germany) Andreas Heinz (Germany) Max Schwenger	20	11
(United States) Phillip Chew (United States) Sattawat Pongnairat	19	12
(England) Marcus Ellis (Scotland) Paul Van Rietvelde	21	21

Qualifying Competition
3	(South Korea) Kang Ji-wook (South Korea) Lee Sang-joon	21	18	20
(England) Marcus Ellis (Scotland) Paul Van Rietvelde	19	21	22

==== Third qualifier ====
First round
(Germany) Peter Käsbauer (Germany) Josche Zurwonne	21	21
(New Zealand) Kevin Dennerly-Minturn (New Zealand) Oliver Leydon-Davis	8	9
(France) Ronan Labar (France) Mathias Quere	21	12	19
4	(Denmark) Christian Skovgård (Denmark) Mads Pieler Kolding	17	21	21

Qualifying Competition
(Germany) Peter Käsbauer (Germany) Josche Zurwonne	23	18	21
4	(Denmark) Christian Skovgård (Denmark) Mads Pieler Kolding	21	21	19

==== Fourth qualifier ====
First round
(Poland) Adam Cwałina (Poland) Przemysław Wacha	18	15
(India) Pranav Chopra (India) Akhsay Dewalkar	21	21
(Thailand) Bodin Issara (Thailand) Pakkawat Vilailak	21	21
2	(India) Tarun Kona (India) Arun Vishnu	16	18

Qualifying Competition
(India) Pranav Chopra (India) Akhsay Dewalkar	14	10
(Thailand) Bodin Issara (Thailand) Pakkawat Vilailak	21	21

== Women's doubles ==
=== Seeds ===
1. (Canada) Nicole Grether/ Charmaine Reid (PMD)
2. (Netherlands) Samantha Barning / Eefje Muskens (Not Qualified)
3. (Scotland) Jillie Cooper / Kirsty Gilmour (Not Qualified)
4. (India) Pradnya Gadre / Ashwini Ponnappa (Not Qualified)

=== Qualifiers ===
1. (China) Cheng Shu / Zhao Yunlei
2. (England) Lauren Smith / Gabrielle White
3. (Thailand) Artima Serithammarak / Peeraya Munkitamorn
4. (Scotland) Imogen Bankier / Petya Nedelcheva

=== Qualifying draw ===
==== First qualifier ====
First round
1	(Canada) Nicole Grether (Canada) Charmaine Reid	14	18
(China) Cheng Shu (China) Zhao Yunlei	21	21
(England) Sophie Brown (England) Helena Lewczynska	13	9
(Indonesia) Variella Aprilsasi (Indonesia) Vita Marissa	21	21

Qualifying Competition
(China) Cheng Shu (China) Zhao Yunlei	21	21
(Indonesia) Variella Aprilsasi (Indonesia) Vita Marissa	12	7

==== Second qualifier ====
First round
4	(India) Pradnya Gadre (India) Ashwini Ponnappa	21	21
(Wales) Sarah Thomas (Wales) Carissa Turner	8	12
(England) Lauren Smith (England) Gabrielle White	21	21
(Germany) Isabel Herttrich (Germany) Carla Nelte	17	15

Qualifying Competition
4	(India) Pradnya Gadre (India) Ashwini Ponnappa	13	13
(England) Lauren Smith (England) Gabrielle White	21	21

==== Third qualifier ====
First round
(Thailand) Artima Serithammarak (Thailand) Peeraya Munkitamorn
(India) Jwala Gutta (India) Prajakta Sawant	WO
(England) Jessica Fletcher (England) Alyssa Lim	18	18
3	(Scotland) Jillie Cooper (Scotland) Kirsty Gilmour	21	21

Qualifying Competition
(Thailand) Artima Serithammarak (Thailand) Peeraya Munkitamorn	21	21
3	(Scotland) Jillie Cooper (Scotland) Kirsty Gilmour	14	11

==== Fourth qualifier ====
First round
(Scotland) Imogen Bankier (Bulgaria) Petya Nedelcheva	21	21
(England) Heather Olver (England) Kate Robertshaw	6	15
(France) Audrey Fontaine (France) Emilie Lefel	13	9
2	(Netherlands) Samantha Barning (Netherlands) Eefje Muskens	21	21

Qualifying Competition
(Scotland) Imogen Bankier (Bulgaria) Petya Nedelcheva	21	21
2	(Netherlands) Samantha Barning (Netherlands) Eefje Muskens	14	16

== Mixed doubles ==
=== Seeds ===
1. (Russia) Vitali Durkin / Nina Vislova (withdrew)
2. (England) Chris Langridge / Heather Oliver (Not Qualified)
3. (South Korea) Lee Sang-joon / Kim So-young (Not Qualified)
4. (Russia) Vladimir Ivanov / Valeria Sorokina (Not Qualified)

=== Qualifying draw ===
==== First qualifier ====
First round
PFR	(South Korea) Kang Ji-wook (South Korea) Shin Seung-chan	16	16
(Hong Kong) Lee Chun Hei (Hong Kong) Chau Hoi Wah	21	21
PFR	(India) A Dewalkar (India) P Gadre	21	21
(Chinese Taipei) Lu Chia-bin (Chinese Taipei) Chang Ya-lan	12	13

Qualifying Competition
(Hong Kong) Lee Chun Hei (Hong Kong) Chau Hoi Wah	24	14	18
PFR	(India) A Dewalkar (India) P Gadre	22	21	21

==== Second qualifier ====
First round
3	(South Korea) Lee Sang-joon (South Korea) Kim So-young	19	21	21
(India) Arun Vishnu (India) Aparna Balan	21	9	19
(Hong Kong) Chan Yun Lung (Hong Kong) Tse Ying Suet	21	22
(Scotland) Robert Blair (Scotland) Jillie Cooper	15	20

Qualifying Competition
3	(South Korea) Lee Sang-joon (South Korea) Kim So-young	19	12
(Hong Kong) Chan Yun Lung (Hong Kong) Tse Ying Suet	21	21

==== Third qualifier ====
First round
(Germany) Max Schwenger (Germany) Carla Nelte	10	14
(England) Chris Adcock (England) Gabrielle White	21	21
(England) Ben Stawski (England) Lauren Smith	7	16
4	(Russia) Vladimir Ivanov (Russia) Valeria Sorokina	21	21

Qualifying Competition
(England) Chris Adcock (England) Gabrielle White	21	21
4	(Russia) Vladimir Ivanov (Russia) Valeria Sorokina	8	17

==== Fourth qualifier ====
First round
(Indonesia) Praveen Jordan (Indonesia) Vita Marissa	21	16	21
(Republic of Ireland) Sam Magee (Republic of Ireland) Chloe Magee	12	21	17
(France) Ronan Labar (France) Laura Choinet	14	11
2	(England) Chris Langridge (England) Heather Olver	21	21

Qualifying Competition
(Indonesia) Praveen Jordan (Indonesia) Vita Marissa	24	21
2	(England) Chris Langridge (England) Heather Olver	22	17
