= 2015 All England Super Series Premier Qualification =

Badminton championships

Qualification for 2015 All England Super Series Premier was held on 3 March 2015.

== Men's Single ==
=== Seeds ===
1. (Indonesia) Dionysius Hayom Rumbaka
2. (Thailand) Boonsak Ponsana
3. (China) Xue Song
4. (Malaysia) Chong Wei Feng (withdrew)

=== Qualifying draw ===
==== First qualifier ====
First Round
1	(Indonesia) Dionysius Hayom Rumbaka	18	21	21
(Malaysia) Mohamad Arif Abdul Latif	21	15	18
(Denmark) Rasmus Fladberg	15	7
(Indonesia) Simon Santoso	21	21

Qualifying Competition
1	(Indonesia) Dionysius Hayom Rumbaka	21	21
(Indonesia) Simon Santoso	14	17

==== Second qualifier ====
First Round
(United States) Sattawat Pongnairat	17	11
(India) Anand Pawar	21	21
(Chinese Taipei) Wang Tzu Wei	13	14
(India) Ajay Jayaram	21	21

Qualifying Competition
(India) Anand Pawar	9	10
(India) Ajay Jayaram	21	21

==== Third qualifier ====
First Round
(Czech Republic) Petr Koukal	20	21	7
(Germany) Dieter Domke	22	17	21
(Finland) Ville Lang	16	10
3	(China) Xue Song	21	21

Qualifying Competition
(Germany) Dieter Domke	18	16
3	(China) Xue Song	21	21

==== Fourth qualifier ====
First Round
(Israel) Misha Zilberman	19	20
(Denmark) Joachim Persson	21	22
(Singapore) Derek Wong Zi Liang	11	16
2	(Thailand) Boonsak Ponsana	21	21

Qualifying Competition
(Denmark) Joachim Persson	16	17
2	(Thailand) Boonsak Ponsana	21	21

== Women's Single ==
=== Seeds ===
1. (Republic of Ireland) Chloe Magee (moved to First Round)
2. (Indonesia) Bellaetrix Manuputty
3. (United States) Iris Wang
4. (Switzerland) Sabrina Jaquet (withdrew)

=== Qualifying draw ===
==== First qualifier ====
First Round
(Malaysia) Lim Peiy Zhean	11	6
(South Korea) Kim Hyo-min	21	21
(Russia) Evgeniya Kosetskaya	9	21	20
(Czech Republic) Kristina Gavnholt	21	19	22

Qualifying Competition
(South Korea) Kim Hyo-min	21	21
(Czech Republic) Kristina Gavnholt	14	15

==== Second qualifier ====
First Round
4	(Malaysia) Payee Lim Peiy Yee	14	8
(England) Fontaine Mica Chapman	21	21
(Russia) Ekaterina Bolotova	19	19
(United States) Rong Schafer	21	21

Qualifying Competition
(England) Fontaine Mica Chapman	22	21
(United States) Rong Schafer	20	15

==== Third qualifier ====
First Round
(United States) Jamie Subandhi	17	14
(Japan) Yui Hashimoto	21	21
(Austria) Simone Prutsch	11	10
3	(United States) Iris Wang	21	21

Qualifying Competition
(Japan) Yui Hashimoto	21	17	21
3	(United States) Iris Wang	19	21	10

==== Fourth qualifier ====
First Round
(Slovakia) Jana Ciznarova	15	19
(Indonesia) Millicent Wiranto	21	21
(Estonia) Kati Tolmoff	9	21	14
2	(Indonesia) Bellaetrix Manuputty	21	15	21

Qualifying Competition
(Indonesia) Millicent Wiranto	11	12
2	(Indonesia) Bellaetrix Manuputty	21	21

== Men's doubles ==
=== Seeds ===
1. (Germany) Raphael Beck / (Germany) Andreas Heinz
2. (England) Andrew Ellis / (England) Peter Mills
3. (Chinese Taipei) Chen Hung-Ling / (Chinese Taipei) Wang Chi-Lin
4. (Belgium) Matijs Dierickx / (Belgium) Freek Golinski

=== Qualifying draw ===
==== First qualifier ====
First Round
1	(Germany) Raphael Beck (Germany) Andreas Heinz
bye
(Hong Kong) Alan Chan Yun Lung (Hong Kong) Reginald Lee Chun Hei	18	10
(Germany) Fabian Holzer (Germany) Mark Lamsfuss	21	21

Qualifying Competition
1	(Germany) Raphael Beck (Germany) Andreas Heinz	15	11^{r}
(Germany) Fabian Holzer (Germany) Mark Lamsfuss	21	15

==== Second qualifier ====
First Round
4	(Belgium) Matijs Dierickx (Belgium) Freek Golinski
bye
(Indonesia) Markis Kido (Indonesia) Agripinna Putra	21	21
(India) D. Guru Prasad (India) Venkatesh Prasad	9	11

Qualifying Competition
4	(Belgium) Matijs Dierickx (Belgium) Freek Golinski	16	19
(Indonesia) Markis Kido (Indonesia) Agripinna Putra	21	21

==== Third qualifier ====
First Round
(Netherlands) Jacco Arends (Netherlands) Jelle Maas	21	21
(India) S. Sanjeeth (India) Jagadish Yadav	16	10
(Denmark) Mathias Christiansen (Denmark) David Daugaard	21	14	12
3	(Chinese Taipei) Chen Hung-Ling (Chinese Taipei) Wang Chi-Lin	19	21	21

Qualifying Competition
(Netherlands) Jacco Arends (Netherlands) Jelle Maas	15	21	16
3	(Chinese Taipei) Chen Hung-Ling (Chinese Taipei) Wang Chi-Lin	21	19	21

==== Fourth qualifier ====
First Round
(England) Christopher Coles (Scotland) Paul Van Rietvelde	15	13
(Chinese Taipei) Lin Chia-Yu (Chinese Taipei) Wu Hsiao-Lin	21	21
bye
2	(England) Andrew Ellis (England) Peter Mills

Qualifying Competition
(Chinese Taipei) Lin Chia-Yu (Chinese Taipei) Wu Hsiao-Lin	21	11	14
2	(England) Andrew Ellis (England) Peter Mills	18	21	21

== Women's doubles ==
=== Seeds ===
1. (Indonesia) Dian Fitriani / (Indonesia) Nadya Melati
2. (Thailand) Jongkonphan Kittiharakul / (Thailand) Rawinda Prajongjai
3. (Indonesia) Della Destiara Haris / (Indonesia) Rosyita Eka Putri Sari (withdrew)
4. (Indonesia) Suci Rizky Andini / (Indonesia) Maretha Dea Giovani

=== Qualifying draw ===
==== First qualifier ====
First Round
1	(Indonesia) Dian Fitriani (Indonesia) Nadya Melati
bye
(Denmark) Maiken Fruergaard (Denmark) Sara Thygesen	21	19	21
(Chinese Taipei) Hsu Ya-Ching (Chinese Taipei) Pai Yu-Po	10	21	15

Qualifying Competition
1	(Indonesia) Dian Fitriani (Indonesia) Nadya Melati	21	16	21
(Denmark) Maiken Fruergaard (Denmark) Sara Thygesen	15	21	19

==== Second qualifier ====
First Round
4	(Indonesia) Suci Rizky Andini (Indonesia) Maretha Dea Giovani
bye
bye
(England) Heather Oliver (England) Lauren Smith

Qualifying Competition
4	(Indonesia) Suci Rizky Andini (Indonesia) Maretha Dea Giovani	21	9	21
(England) Heather Oliver (England) Lauren Smith	17	21	13

==== Third qualifier ====
First Round
(Malaysia) Payee Lim Peiy Yee (Malaysia) Lim Peiy Zhean	7	6
(Denmark) Lena Grebak (Denmark) Maria Helsbol	21	21
bye
bye

Qualifying Competition
(Denmark) Lena Grebak (Denmark) Maria Helsbol
bye

==== Fourth qualifier ====
First Round
(England) Jenny Moore (England) Victoria Williams	13	19
(Germany) Isabel Herttrich (Germany) Birgit Michels	21	21
bye
2	(Thailand) Jongkonphan Kittiharakul (Thailand) Rawinda Prajongjai

Qualifying Competition
(Germany) Isabel Herttrich (Germany) Birgit Michels	21	14	21
2	(Thailand) Jongkonphan Kittiharakul (Thailand) Rawinda Prajongjai	16	21	16

== Mixed doubles ==
=== Seeds ===
1. (Malaysia) Tan Aik Quan / (Malaysia) Lai Pei Jing (Moved to First Round)
2. (South Korea) Choi Sol-kyu / (South Korea) Chae Yoo-jung
3. (Denmark) Mathias Christiansen / (Denmark) Lena Grebak
4. (Russia) Ivan Sozonov / (Russia) Ekaterina Bolotova

=== Qualifying draw ===
==== First qualifier ====
First Round
bye
bye
(England) Christopher Coles (England) Sophia Brown	19	11
(Russia) Vladimir Ivanov (India) Ashwini Ponnappa	21	8^{r}

Qualifying Competition
bye
(England) Christopher Coles (England) Sophia Brown

==== Second qualifier ====
First Round
3	(Denmark) Mathias Christiansen (Denmark) Lena Grebak
bye
(Indonesia) Markus Fernaldi Gideon (Indonesia) Nitya Krishinda Maheswari	21	21
(England) Gregory Mairs (England) Jenny Moore	18	18

Qualifying Competition
3	(Denmark) Mathias Christiansen (Denmark) Lena Grebak	21	21
(Indonesia) Markus Fernaldi Gideon (Indonesia) Nitya Krishinda Maheswari	18	15

==== Third qualifier ====
First Round
(England) Oliver Baczala (England) Victoria Williams	20	21	11
(Indonesia) Kevin Sanjaya Sukamuljo (Indonesia) Greysia Polii	22	18	21
(Indonesia) Agripinna Putra (Indonesia) Rizki Amelia Pradipta	21	19	12
4	(Russia) Ivan Sozonov (Russia) Ekaterina Bolotova	18	21	21

Qualifying Competition
(Indonesia) Kevin Sanjaya Sukamuljo (Indonesia) Greysia Polii	21	21
4	(Russia) Ivan Sozonov (Russia) Ekaterina Bolotova	18	12

==== Fourth qualifier ====
First Round
(Japan) Keigo Sonoda (Japan) Reika Kakiiwa	14	21	21
(England) Harley Towler (England) Emily Westwood	21	14	17
bye
2	(South Korea) Choi Sol-kyu (South Korea) Chae Yoo-jung

Qualifying Competition
(Japan) Keigo Sonoda (Japan) Reika Kakiiwa	17	18
2	(South Korea) Choi Sol-kyu (South Korea) Chae Yoo-jung	21	21
