= Badminton at the 2010 Commonwealth Games – Men's singles =

The Men's singles event of badminton at the 2010 Commonwealth Games was held from 9 October – 14 October 2010 in Siri Fort Sports Complex, New Delhi, India.

== Men's singles ==
Round of 16
(Malaysia) Lee Chong Wei	21	21
(Zambia) Juma Muwowo	9	9
(Singapore) Ashton Chen Yong Zhao	21	21
(Sri Lanka) Dinuka Karunaratne	19	8
(India) Chetan Buradagunta	21	21
(Wales) Jamie van Hooijdonk	8	2
(England) Carl Baxter	21	21
(Jamaica) Gareth Henry	11	14
(India) Kashyap Parupalli	21	21
(Scotland) Kieran Merrilees	12	15
(Malaysia) Muhammad Hafiz	21	21
(Sri Lanka) Kindelpitiyage Lasitha Karunathilaka	14	13
(Singapore) Derek Wong Zi Liang	25	21
(Australia) Jeff Tho	23	16
(England) Rajiv Ouseph	21	12	21
(Sri Lanka) Niluka Karunaratne	5	21	18

Quarter-finals
1	Lee Chong Wei (MAS)	21	21
8	Ashton Chen Yong Zhao (SIN)	13	11
3	Chetan Buradagunta (IND)	21	21
5	Carl Baxter (ENG)	17	9
6	Kashyap Parupalli (IND)	19	21	21
4	Muhammad Hafiz (MAS)	21	19	16
7	Derek Wong Zi Liang (SIN)	13	15
2	Rajiv Ouseph (ENG)	21	21

Semi-finals
1	Lee Chong Wei (MAS)	21	21
3	Chetan Buradagunta (IND)	11	12
6	Kashyap Parupalli (IND)	19	21	18
2	Rajiv Ouseph (ENG)	21	12	21

Final
1	Lee Chong Wei (MAS)	21	21
2	Rajiv Ouseph (ENG)	10	8
Third place
3	Chetan Buradagunta (IND)	15	18
6	Kashyap Parupalli (IND)	21	21
