= Rajiv Ouseph =

English badminton player (born 1986)

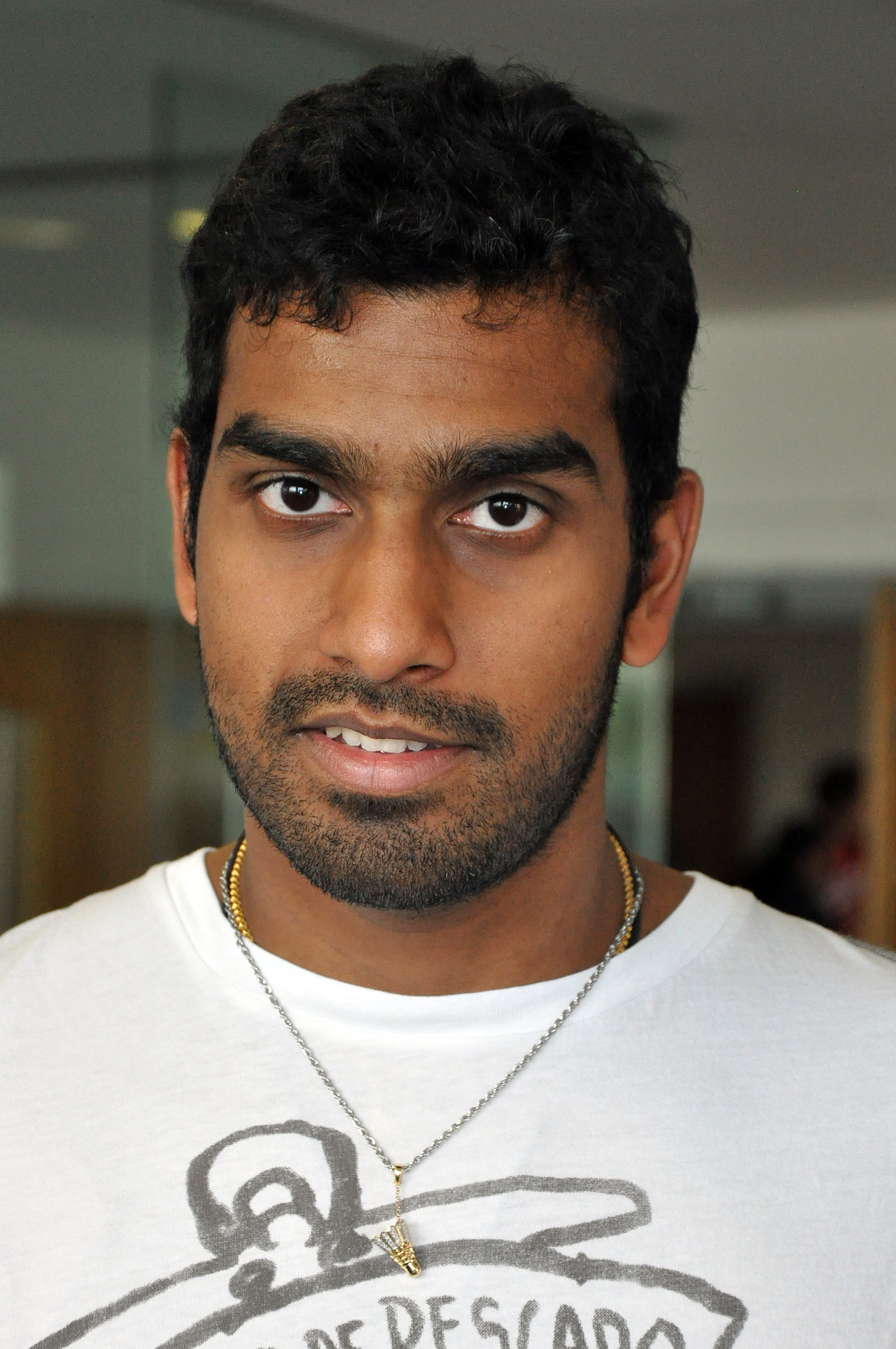
- Ouseph in August 2011

Personal information
- Born: 30 August 1986 (age 40) Hounslow, London, England
- Height: 1.88 m (6 ft 2 in)
- Weight: 82 kg (181 lb)

Sport
- Country: England
- Sport: Badminton
- Handedness: Right

Men's singles
- Highest ranking: 10 (27 October 2016)
- BWF profile
Medal record
Men's badminton
Representing England
Sudirman Cup
Bronze medal – third place	2007 Glasgow	Mixed team
Commonwealth Games
Silver medal – second place	2010 Delhi	Men's singles
Silver medal – second place	2014 Glasgow	Mixed team
Bronze medal – third place	2010 Delhi	Mixed team
Bronze medal – third place	2018 Gold Coast	Men's singles
Bronze medal – third place	2018 Gold Coast	Mixed team
European Championships
Gold medal – first place	2017 Kolding	Men's singles
Silver medal – second place	2014 Kazan	Men's singles
Silver medal – second place	2018 Huelva	Men's singles
Bronze medal – third place	2010 Manchester	Men's singles
Bronze medal – third place	2016 La Roche-sur-Yon	Men's singles
European Mixed Team Championships
Silver medal – second place	2015 Leuven	Mixed team
Bronze medal – third place	2013 Moscow	Mixed team
European Men's Team Championships
Silver medal – second place	2008 Almere	Men's team
Silver medal – second place	2014 Basel	Men's team
Silver medal – second place	2018 Kazan	Men's team
Bronze medal – third place	2006 Thessalonica	Men's team
Bronze medal – third place	2012 Amsterdam	Men's team
Bronze medal – third place	2016 Kazan	Men's team
Commonwealth Youth Games
Bronze medal – third place	2004 Bendigo	Mixed team
European Junior Championships
Gold medal – first place	2005 Den Bosch	Boys' singles

Theratil Rajiv Ouseph (born 30 August 1986) is a former international badminton player from England who has represented both England and Great Britain. A long-time English and British No.1, Ouseph's most significant international tournament achievement was becoming the European Men's Singles Champion, winning the title in 2017.

Ouseph was born and brought up in west London and is of Indian descent with Kerala heritage.

== Career ==
Ouseph has won the men's singles titles at the National Championships, seven times in a row from 2008 to 2014, the first player to do so. Ouseph became the first player to win more than four consecutive national singles titles since Darren Hall (1988–1991).

In the junior English national circuit, he has won all the singles titles from the ages of U–13 to U–19. In the European tournaments, he has won the U–19 Danish titles in singles and mixed doubles and the German Junior title in singles. His other notable achievements are winning the European Junior Championship in 2005, the first Englishman to win the title in twenty years.

In 2009, he won the Canadian International, Le Volant d'Or de Toulouse, Scottish Open, Irish Open and went on to win the 2009 European Circuit Finals.

He won his first senior cap for England at the age of nineteen in the Thomas Cup. He also represented England in the Sudirman Cup where he was the youngest player in the English team. Ouseph was selected as the number one singles player for the English team in the Thomas Cup qualifiers which was held in Poland in February 2010.

Ouseph was ranked as world number 11 in November 2010, after winning the U.S. Open men's singles title and winning the bronze medal in the men's singles in the European Championships. Later that year he won a silver medal at the 2010 Commonwealth Games in the men's singles, as well as the bronze medal in the mixed team event.

In 2014, Ouseph took silver at the European Championships after losing to top seed Jan Ø. Jørgensen of Denmark in Kazan, Russia.

Representing Great Britain at the 2016 Summer Olympics in the men's singles event, he was defeated by bronze medallist Viktor Axelsen from Denmark in quarter finals.

In 2017 Rajiv became the first English Men’s Singles player in 27 years to become a European Champion. In Kolding, Denmark he beat the home soil favourites to win the European Championships.

== Achievements ==
=== Commonwealth Games ===
Men's singles
Year	Venue	Opponent	Score	Result
2010	Siri Fort Sports Complex; New Delhi, India	(Malaysia) Lee Chong Wei	10–21, 8–21	Silver
2018	Carrara Sports and Leisure Centre; Gold Coast, Australia	(India) Prannoy H. S.	17–21, 25–23, 21–9	Bronze

=== European Championships ===
Men's singles
Year	Venue	Opponent	Score	Result
2010	Manchester Evening News Arena; Manchester, England	(Denmark) Jan Ø. Jørgensen	14–21, 20–22	Bronze
2014	Gymnastics Center; Kazan, Russia	(Denmark) Jan Ø. Jørgensen	18–21, 10–21	Silver
2016	Vendéspace; La Roche-sur-Yon, France	(Denmark) Jan Ø. Jørgensen	11–21, 16–21	Bronze
2017	Sydbank Arena; Kolding, Denmark	(Denmark) Anders Antonsen	21–19, 21–19	Gold
2018	Palacio de los Deportes Carolina Marín; Huelva, Spain	(Denmark) Viktor Axelsen	8–21, 7–21	Silver

=== European Junior Championships ===
Boys' singles
Year	Venue	Opponent	Score	Result
2005	De Maaspoort; Den Bosch, Netherlands	(Germany) Dieter Domke	15–0, 15–4	Gold

=== BWF World Tour ===
The BWF World Tour, which was announced on 19 March 2017 and implemented in 2018, is a series of elite badminton tournaments sanctioned by the Badminton World Federation (BWF). The BWF World Tours are divided into levels of World Tour Finals, Super 1000, Super 750, Super 500, Super 300 (part of the HSBC World Tour), and the BWF Tour Super 100.

Men's singles
Year	Tournament	Level	Opponent	Score	Result
2018	SaarLorLux Open	Super 100	(India) Subhankar Dey	11–21, 14–21	(silver) Runner-up

=== BWF Grand Prix ===
The BWF Grand Prix had two levels, the BWF Grand Prix and Grand Prix Gold. It was a series of badminton tournaments sanctioned by the Badminton World Federation (BWF) which was held from 2007 to 2017.

Men's singles
Year	Tournament	Opponent	Score	Result
2010	U.S. Open	(France) Brice Leverdez	21–17, 21–9	(gold) Winner
2015	Scottish Open	(Denmark) Hans-Kristian Vittinghus	19–21, 21–11, 16–21	(silver) Runner-up
2015	U.S. Grand Prix	(South Korea) Lee Hyun-il	19–21, 12–21	(silver) Runner-up

BWF Grand Prix Gold tournament
BWF Grand Prix tournament

=== BWF International Challenge/Series ===
Men's singles
Year	Tournament	Opponent	Score	Result
2007	Dutch International	(China) Wu Yunyong	16–21, 16–21	(silver) Runner-up
2008	Scottish International	(India) Anand Pawar	21–17, 21–8	(gold) Winner
2008	Irish International	(Republic of Ireland) Scott Evans	21–5, 21–19	(gold) Winner
2009	Le Volant d'Or de Toulouse	(India) Kashyap Parupalli	21–11, 21–12	(gold) Winner
2009	Canadian International	(England) Carl Baxter	21–11, 21–19	(gold) Winner
2011	Scottish International	(England) Carl Baxter	21–18, 21–10	(gold) Winner
2011	Irish International	(Poland) Przemysław Wacha	21–15, 11–5 retired	(gold) Winner
2012	Finnish Open	(Sweden) Henri Hurskainen	21–18, 16–21, 21–18	(gold) Winner
2013	French International	(Denmark) Flemming Quach	21–15, 21–15	(gold) Winner
2013	Finnish Open	(Ukraine) Dmytro Zavadsky	21–16, 21–12	(gold) Winner
2015	Swedish Masters	(Spain) Pablo Abián	21–15, 21–17	(gold) Winner

BWF International Challenge tournament
BWF International Series tournament

=== National titles ===
- 2005 English U–19 Nationals men's singles Winner
- 2008 English Nationals men's singles winner
- 2009 English Nationals men's singles winner
- 2010 English Nationals men's singles winner
- 2011 English Nationals men's singles winner
- 2012 English Nationals men's singles winner
- 2013 English Nationals men's singles winner
- 2014 English Nationals men's singles winner
- 2016 English Nationals men's singles winner

== Personal life ==
Ouseph took up badminton at the age of 9, encouraged by the rest of his family who also played badminton. Although he began a degree in Media at Loughborough University, he chose to give it up in favour of his badminton career.
