= Nguyễn Tiến Minh =

Vietnamese badminton player (born 1983)

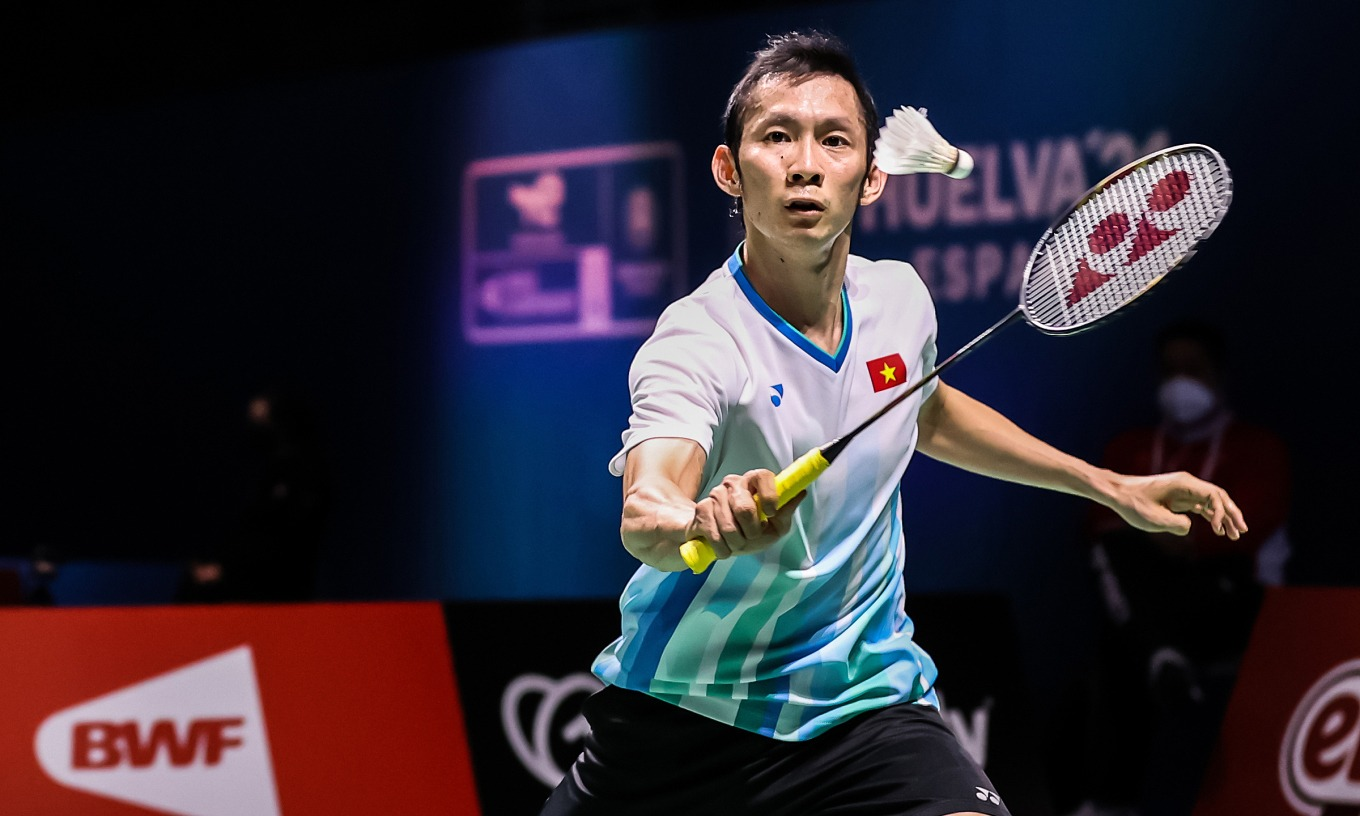
- Tiến Minh at the 2021 World Championships

Personal information
- Born: February 12, 1983 (age 43) Ho Chi Minh City, Vietnam
- Height: 1.69 m (5 ft 7 in)
- Weight: 59 kg (130 lb; 9.3 st)

Sport
- Country: Vietnam
- Sport: Badminton
- Handedness: Right

Men's singles
- Career record: 457 wins, 197 losses
- Highest ranking: 5 (2 December 2010)
- BWF profile
Medal record
Men's badminton
Representing Vietnam
World Championships
Bronze medal – third place	2013 Guangzhou	Men's singles
Asian Championships
Bronze medal – third place	2019 Wuhan	Men's singles
SEA Games
Bronze medal – third place	2005 Manila	Men's team
Bronze medal – third place	2007 Nakhon Ratchasima	Men's singles
Bronze medal – third place	2013 Naypyidaw	Men's singles
Bronze medal – third place	2017 Kuala Lumpur	Men's singles
Bronze medal – third place	2021 Vietnam	Men's singles

Nguyễn Tiến Minh (born February 12, 1983) is a Vietnamese badminton player. His best achievement to date was the bronze medal at the World Championship in 2013.

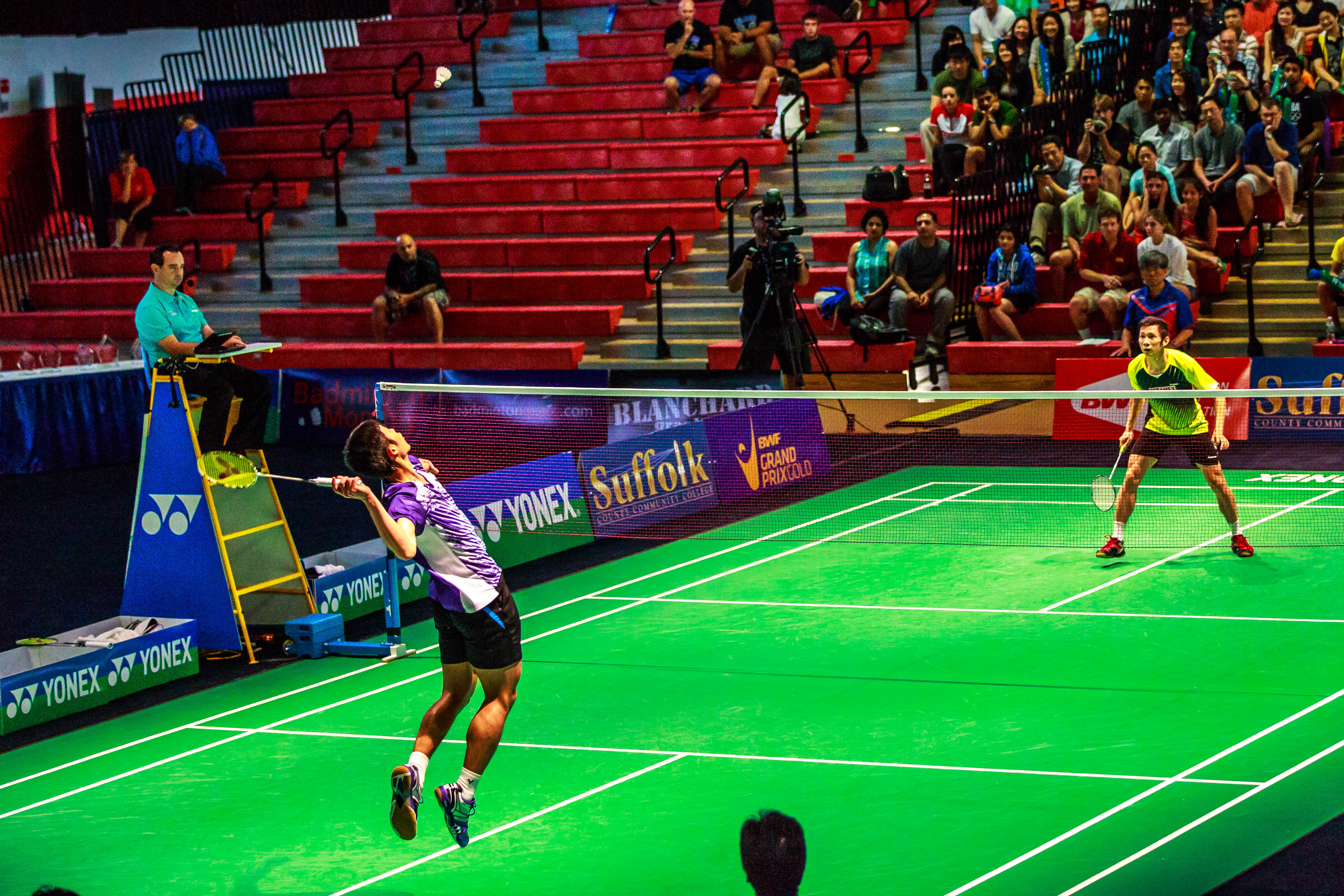
Nguyen Tien Minh versus Chou Tien-chen in the final of 2014 U.S. Open

== Career ==
Introduced to badminton by his father at the early age of 10, Nguyen Tien Minh was immediately captivated by the sport. The interest soon developed into a passion which led to Tien Minh's crucial decision in 2001 when the athlete was 18 years old: to take on the path of becoming a professional badminton player instead of carrying on his education as his family wished. The young man's determination soon demonstrated its fruitful aspects when he was recruited into the national team in the same year. However, Tien Minh's career did not become well known nationwide until 2002 when he, at the age of 19, defeated the long time national champion, Nguyễn Phú Cường, and won the gold medal for the men's singles category.

Nevertheless, despite Tien Minh's quick progress, the badminton player was receiving a salary of less than 150 US dollars a month, as most Vietnamese athletes were at the time. After years of contributing to the nation's sport team, while his ranking has been progressing significantly and rapidly, Tien Minh's income has only been increased by around 50 dollars. Vietnamese athletes, with incomes much higher than that of Tien Minh's, normally have specially assigned specialists to look after their every aspect, such as diet, injuries, and endurance training, not to mention all the top ranking sporting facilities provided for by the government. On the other side of the scale, he has been trained in an environment with nothing but poor equipment and has to rely mostly on his family's financial support, the effort of his few coaches, and the contributions of his teammates.

Tien Minh is portrayed by a common description in his home country, "the athlete with a herculean progress".

=== World Championship 2013 ===
Nguyen Tien Minh came into the world championship seeded #7. His previous best achievement at a world championship was to get to the quarter-final round at the 2011 championship in London, where he lost to Peter Gade of Denmark in three sets.

The first match was an easy affair (21–8, 21–11) against the New Zealand player Joe Wu, who ranked 110.

The second match against the German Dieter Domke turned out to be quite tight. He started well, but then faded, and almost lost the first set. He was able to close out the set 24–22 though. He then won the second set 21–17.

In the next round, Tien Minh played the Spaniard Pablo Abián. Tien Minh lost the first set 15–21, but came back strongly and easily won the next two sets 21–9, 21–10.

The quarterfinal match between Nguyen Tien Minh and Jan Ø. Jørgensen, rank #9, was a three-setter. Both players knew a lot was at stake here: the winner not only got to the semi-final, but would also be guaranteed a medal (the two losers in the semi-final both win bronze medals). That would be the first medal for both players at a world championship. Tien Minh won in three set match (21–8, 17–21, 22–20). He became the first Vietnamese to win a medal at the world championship.

In the semi-final against Lin Dan, Tien Minh lost 17–21 15–21. Despite the semi-final loss, the bronze medal was still a huge success for him.

Immediately after the championship, Tien Minh was nominated by the governmental sports authority of Vietnam (the TCTDTT - Bureau of Sports and Physical Activities) for an Order of Labor, 2nd class. He had been awarded the Order of Labor, 3rd class in 2011, also for his achievements and excellency in the field of sports.

== Personal life ==
Nguyen Tien Minh opened a sports apparel and equipment store named Tien Minh Shop in Ho Chi Minh City in early 2016.

In December 2016, Tien Minh married his long-time girlfriend Vũ Thị Trang. Vũ is also a badminton player and has been competing alongside Tien Minh throughout many international tournaments.

39 as of 2022, Nguyen Tien Minh's 13th time attending the BWF World Championships is a current world record.

== Achievements ==
=== BWF World Championships ===
Men's singles
Year	Venue	Opponent	Score	Result
2013	Tianhe Sports Center; Guangzhou, China	(China) Lin Dan	17–21, 15–21	Bronze

=== Asian Championships ===
Men's singles
Year	Venue	Opponent	Score	Result
2019	Wuhan Sports Center Gymnasium; Wuhan, China	(Japan) Kento Momota	18–21, 8–21	Bronze

=== SEA Games ===
Men's singles
Year	Venue	Opponent	Score	Result
2007	Vongchavalitkul University; Nakhon Ratchasima, Thailand	(Indonesia) Taufik Hidayat	15–21, 21–14, 14–21	Bronze
2013	Wunna Theikdi Indoor Stadium; Naypyidaw, Myanmar	(Indonesia) Dionysius Hayom Rumbaka	21–13, 12–21, 20–22	Bronze
2017	Axiata Arena; Kuala Lumpur, Malaysia	(Indonesia) Jonatan Christie	11–21, 16–21	Bronze
2021	Bac Giang Gymnasium; Bắc Giang, Vietnam	(Singapore) Loh Kean Yew	15–21, 21–10, 21–23	Bronze

=== BWF Grand Prix (10 titles, 3 runners-up) ===
The BWF Grand Prix had two levels, the Grand Prix and Grand Prix Gold. It was a series of badminton tournaments sanctioned by the Badminton World Federation (BWF) and played between 2007 and 2017.

Men's singles
Year	Tournament	Opponent	Score	Result
2008	Vietnam Open	(Hong Kong) Chan Yan Kit	24–22, 21–18	(gold) Winner
2009	Thailand Open	(Thailand) Boonsak Ponsana	21–16, 21–13	(gold) Winner
2009	Chinese Taipei Open	(Malaysia) Wong Choong Hann	21–11, 21–14	(gold) Winner
2009	Vietnam Open	(Malaysia) Chong Wei Feng	21–7, 19–21, 21–14	(gold) Winner
2010	Australian Open	(Malaysia) Yogendran Khrishnan	21–14, 21–11	(gold) Winner
2011	U.S. Open	(Japan) Sho Sasaki	17–21, 18–21	(silver) Runner-up
2011	Vietnam Open	(Japan) Sho Sasaki	21–13, 21–17	(gold) Winner
2012	Australian Open	(China) Chen Jin	11–21, 12–21	(silver) Runner-up
2012	Vietnam Open	(Japan) Takuma Ueda	21–14, 21–19	(gold) Winner
2012	Chinese Taipei Open	(Chinese Taipei) Chou Tien-chen	21–11, 21–17	(gold) Winner
2013	U.S. Open	(Hong Kong) Wong Wing Ki	18–21, 21–17, 21–18	(gold) Winner
2013	Chinese Taipei Open	(South Korea) Son Wan-ho	21–19, 9–21, 18–21	(silver) Runner-up
2014	U.S. Open	(Chinese Taipei) Chou Tien-chen	21–19, 14–21, 21–19	(gold) Winner

BWF Grand Prix Gold tournament
BWF Grand Prix tournament

=== BWF International Challenge/Series (13 titles, 4 runners-up) ===
Men's singles
Year	Tournament	Opponent	Score	Result
2004	Vietnam Satellite	(South Korea) Ahn Hyun-suk	15–13, 9–15, 10–15	(silver) Runner-up
2004	Malaysia Satellite	(Malaysia) Lee Tsuen Seng	15–11, 9–15, 15–12	(gold) Winner
2006	Vietnam Satellite	(Indonesia) Jeffer Rosobin	21–17, 21–12	(gold) Winner
2008	Vietnam International	(Malaysia) Chong Wei Feng	21–17, 10–21, 26–24	(gold) Winner
2009	Vietnam International	(Indonesia) Dionysius Hayom Rumbaka	21–13, 21–15	(gold) Winner
2014	Vietnam International	(Malaysia) Tan Chun Seang	21–17, 21–13	(gold) Winner
2015	White Nights	(Russia) Vladimir Malkov	16–21, 12–21	(silver) Runner-up
2015	Sydney International	(Malaysia) Zulfadli Zulkiffli	21–11, 21–12	(gold) Winner
2016	Waikato International	(Chinese Taipei) Shih Kuei-chun	21–23, 21–8, 21–8	(gold) Winner
2016	Finnish Open	(Japan) Kanta Tsuneyama	10–21, 14–21	(silver) Runner-up
2016	Vietnam International	(Chinese Taipei) Wang Tzu-wei	22–20, 21–16	(gold) Winner
2016	Vietnam International Series	(Malaysia) Lim Chi Wing	21–14, 23–21	(gold) Winner
2017	Vietnam International	(Thailand) Khosit Phetpradab	21–14, 21–17	(gold) Winner
2018	Iran Fajr International	(Vietnam) Phạm Cao Cường	14–15, 11–13, 13–11, 7–11	(silver) Runner-up
2019	North Harbour International	(China) Gao Zhengze	21–13, 21–15	(gold) Winner
2019	Waikato International	(China) Gao Zhengze	14–21, 21–16, 21–17	(gold) Winner
2019	Lagos International	(Israel) Misha Zilberman	21–18, 25–23	(gold) Winner

BWF International Challenge tournament
BWF International Series tournament
BWF Future Series tournament

== Record against top-5 players ==
Nguyễn Tiến Minh's record against players who have been ranked world no. 5 or higher is as follows:

Player	Matches	Record	Win%	Last Match
Number 1 ranked players
(China) Lin Dan	8	0–8	0%	Lost (21–16, 12–21, 12–21) at 2019 BWF World Championships First Round
(Malaysia) Lee Chong Wei	14	1–13	7.7%	Lost (10–21, 5–21) at 2013 Japan Super Series Semifinal
(China) Chen Long	5	1–4	25%	Won by walkover at 2019 Badminton Asia Championships Quarterfinal
(Denmark) Viktor Axelsen	1	0–1	0%	Lost (16–21, 17–21) at 2014 BWF World Championships Third Round
(South Korea) Son Wan-ho	6	3–4	43%	Lost (17–21, 16–21) at 2014 Malaysia Super Series Premier First Round
(Japan) Kento Momota	8	3–5	38%	Lost (18–21, 8-21) at 2019 Badminton Asia Championships Semifinal
(India) Srikanth Kidambi	3	1–2	33%	Lost (18–21, 21–19, 14–21) at 2015 Singapore Super Series First Round
(South Korea) Lee Hyun-il	2	2–0	100%	Won (21–15, 15–21, 21–13) at 2011 Indonesia Super Series Premier First Round
(Denmark) Peter Gade	7	0–7	0%	Lost (17–21, 13–21) at 2011 BWF World Championships Quarterfinal
(China) Bao Chunlai	6	2–4	33%	Lost (11–21, 12–21) at 2011 Yonex OCBC US Open Grand Prix Gold Quarterfinal
(Indonesia) Taufik Hidayat	6	1–5	17%	Lost (21–10, 7–21, 9-21) at 2013 Malaysia Super Series First Round
Number 2 ranked players
(Denmark) Jan Ø. Jørgensen	8	6–2	75%	Won (21–8, 17–21, 22–20) at 2013 BWF World Championships Quarterfinal
(China) Chen Jin	4	0–4	0%	Lost (11–21, 12–21) at 2012 Australia Open Grand Prix Gold Final
(Chinese Taipei) Chou Tien-chen	5	3–2	60%	Lost (12–21, 14–21) at 2015 Chinese Taipei Open Grand Prix Gold Third Round
Number 3 ranked players
(Indonesia) Simon Santoso	5	0–5	0%	Lost (20–22, 21–15, 13–21) at 2015 Chinese Taipei Masters Grand Prix Second Round
(China) Du Pengyu	2	2–2	50%	Lost (19–21, 15–21) at 2013 Indonesia Super Series Premier First Round
(Japan) Kenichi Tago	3	1–2	33%	Lost (21–19, 10–21, 9-21) at 2012 Korea Open Super Series Premier First Round
(Indonesia) Tommy Sugiarto	7	6–1	85%	Lost (22–20, 19–21, 15–21) at 2013 Singapore Super Series Semifinal
(Indonesia) Sony Dwi Kuncoro	4	2–2	50%	Won (21–15, 28–26) at 2012 Vietnam Open Grand Prix Semifinal
Number 4 ranked players
(Thailand) Boonsak Ponsana	5	3–2	60%	Won (21–19, 21–19) at 2015 Mexico City Grand Prix Second Round
(Hong Kong) Hu Yun	10	5–5	50%	Won (22–20, 21–3) at 2015 Chinese Taipei Open Grand Prix Gold Second Round
