= 2009 All England Super Series – Women's singles =

This article lists the results of women's singles categories in the 2009 All England Super Series.

== Seeds ==
1. (Denmark) Tine Rasmussen
2. (Hong Kong) Zhou Mi
3. (China) Lu Lan
4. (France) Pi Hongyan
5. (China) Xie Xingfang
6. (China) Zhu Lin
7. (China) Wang Lin
8. (Germany) Xu Huaiwen

== Draws ==
=== Finals ===
Semifinals
1	(Denmark) Tine Rasmussen	22	25	21
7	(China) Jiang Yanjiao	24	23	15
Q	(Denmark) Nanna Brosolat Jensen	11	7
(China) Wang Yihan	21	21

Final
1	(Denmark) Tine Rasmussen	19	23	11
(China) Wang Yihan	21	21	21

=== Top Half ===
First Round
1	(Denmark) Tine Rasmussen	21	21
(Singapore) Xing Aiying	17	15
(Ukraine) Larisa Griga	18	21	21
(Netherlands) Yao Jie	21	14	12
7	(China) Wang Lin	21	21
(England) Elizabeth Cann	9	11
(Hong Kong) Yip Pui Yin	22	21
Q	(England) Jill Pittard	20	13
3	(China) Lu Lan	21	21
(Japan) Ai Goto	19	9
(Indonesia) Pia Zebadiah Bernadeth	21	17	13
(Netherlands) Judith Meulendijks	14	21	21
6	(China) Zhu Lin	17	11
(China) Jiang Yanjiao	21	21
PFQ	(South Korea) Bae Youn-joo	21	17	21
(Thailand) Salakjit Ponsana	18	21	18

Second Round
1	(Denmark) Tine Rasmussen	21	21
(Ukraine) Larisa Griga	12	13
7	(China) Wang Lin	21	24	19
(Hong Kong) Yip Pui Yin	15	26	21
3	(China) Lu Lan	21	14	21
(Netherlands) Judith Meulendijks	17	21	15
(China) Jiang Yanjiao	25	16	21
PFQ	(South Korea) Bae Youn-joo	23	21	8

Quarterfinals
1	(Denmark) Tine Rasmussen	21	18	21
(Hong Kong) Yip Pui Yin	17	21	16
3	(China) Lu Lan	18	20
(China) Jiang Yanjiao	21	22

Semifinals
1	(Denmark) Tine Rasmussen	22	25	21
(China) Jiang Yanjiao	24	23	15

=== Bottom Half ===
First Round
(Russia) Ella Diehl	14	13
(Malaysia) Julia Wong Pei Xian	21	21
(South Korea) Hwang Hye-youn	15	21	19
8	(Germany) Xu Huaiwen	21	18	21
Q	(Denmark) Nanna Brosolat Jensen	13	21	21
(Scotland) Susan Hughes	21	16	17
(India) Saina Nehwal	15	16
4	(France) Pi Hongyan	21	21
Q	(Bulgaria) Linda Zechiri	12	15
(Indonesia) Adriyanti Firdasari	21	21
Q	(South Korea) Jang Soo-young	9	7
5	(China) Xie Xingfang	21	21
(China) Wang Yihan	21	24
PFQ	(Japan) Megumi Taruno	10	22
PFQ	(Malaysia) Lydia Cheah Li Ya	16	9
2	(Hong Kong) Zhou Mi	21	21

Second Round
(Malaysia) Julia Wong Pei Xian	23	15	21
8	(Germany) Xu Huaiwen	21	21	16
Q	(Denmark) Nanna Brosolat Jensen	21	14	21
4	(France) Pi Hongyan	18	21	19
(Indonesia) Adriyanti Firdasari	15	11
5	(China) Xie Xingfang	21	21
(China) Wang Yihan	21	18	23
2	(Hong Kong) Zhou Mi	19	21	21

Quarterfinals
(Malaysia) Julia Wong Pei Xian	16	16
Q	(Denmark) Nanna Brosolat Jensen	21	21
5	(China) Xie Xingfang	9	13
(China) Wang Yihan	21	21

Semifinals
Q	(Denmark) Nanna Brosolat Jensen	11	7
(China) Wang Yihan	21	21

== Sources ==
Yonex All England Open Super Series 2009 - Women's singles
