= 2006 BWF World Junior Championships – Girls' singles =

2006 BWF World Junior Championships Girls' singles
Tournament details
- Dates: 6 November 2006 – 11 November 2006
- Edition: 8th
- Level: International
- Venue: Samsan World Gymnasium
- Location: Incheon, South Korea

The Girls' singles tournament of the 2006 BWF World Junior Championships is a badminton world junior individual championships for the Eye Level Cups, held on November 6th to November 11th. The defending champion of the last edition is Cheng Shao-chieh from Chinese Taipei. The top seeded Wang Yihan of China won the gold medal in this event after beat Saina Nehwal of India in straight games with the score 21–13, 21–9.

== Seeded ==
1. (China) Wang Yihan (champion)
2. (Malaysia) Lyddia Cheah (fourth round)
3. (China) Han Li (quarter-final)
4. (China) Liu Jie (quarter-final)
5. (Indonesia) Pia Zebadiah Bernadet (quarter-final)
6. (China) Cheng Wen (quarter-final)
7. (South Korea) Jang Soo-young (fourth round)
8. (South Korea) Kim Moon-hi (Semi final)
9. (Thailand) Porntip Buranaprasertsuk (fourth round)
10. (England) Michelle Cheung (second round)
11. (Malaysia) Vivian Hoo (fourth round)
12. (Chinese Taipei) Hung Shih-han (third round)
13. (Denmark) Karina Jørgensen (third round)
14. (India) Saina Nehwal (final)
15. (Malaysia) Tee Jing Yi (third round)
16. (Singapore) Xing Aiying (third round)

== Draw ==
=== Finals ===
Quarterfinals
1	(China) Wang Yihan	21	21
5/8	(Indonesia) Pia Zebadiah Bernadet	18	17
3/4	(China) Han Li	16	21	12
5/8	(South Korea) Kim Moon-hi	21	18	21
9/16	(India) Saina Nehwal	21	21
3/4	(China) Liu Jie	18	8
5/8	(China) Cheng Wen	21	15	14
(South Korea) Bae Youn-joo	10	21	21

Semifinals
1	(China) Wang Yihan	21	21
5/8	(South Korea) Kim Moon-hi	16	13
9/16	(India) Saina Nehwal	25	21
(South Korea) Bae Youn-joo	23	13

Finals
1	(China) Wang Yihan	21	21
9/16	(India) Saina Nehwal	13	9

=== Top Half ===
==== Section 1 ====
First round
(Ukraine) O Pyvovarova	20	20
(Turkey) Ö Çalışkan	22	22
(Indonesia) M Kusumastuti
(New Zealand) V Copeland	WO
(Hong Kong) Tse YS	21	21
(United States) A Wen	5	3
(Singapore) S Ashikin	21	21	21
(England) G White	23	14	13

Second round
1	(China) Wang YH	21	21
(Canada) C Cheung	5	5
(Turkey) Ö Çalışkan	16	13
(Indonesia) M Kusumastuti	21	21
9/16	(Malaysia) V Hoo	17	21	21
(Russia) L Chudentcevc	21	14	16
(Hong Kong) Tse YS	21	21
(Singapore) S Ashikin	18	14

Third round
1	(China) Wang YH	21	21
(Indonesia) M Kusumastuti	11	11
9/16	(Malaysia) V Hoo	22	21
(Hong Kong) Tse YS	20	19

Fourth round
1	(China) Wang YH	21	21
9/16	(Malaysia) V Hoo	14	10

==== Section 2 ====
First round
(Australia) E Pong	21	21
(Mongolia) M Mendjargal	5	10
(Hong Kong) Poon LY	14	7
(Netherlands) P Stolzenbach	21	21
(Macau) Lao IM	6	6
(Russia) K Polikarpova	21	21
(Philippines) K Velez	17	18
(Germany) M Reich	21	21

Second round
5/8	(Indonesia) P Zebadiah	21	21
(Bulgaria) D Popstoikova	11	16
(Australia) E Pong	13	14
(Netherlands) P Stolzenbach	21	21
9/16	(Chinese Taipei) Hung S-h	21	18	21
(Singapore) C Goh	17	21	13
(Russia) K Polikarpova	9	11
(Germany) M Reich	21	21

Third round
5/8	(Indonesia) P Zebadiah	21	21
(Netherlands) P Stolzenbach	13	12
9/16	(Chinese Taipei) Hung S-h	21	17	12
(Germany) M Reich	17	21	21

Fourth round
5/8	(Indonesia) P Zebadiah	21	21
(Germany) M Reich	11	15

==== Section 3 ====
First round
(South Africa) J Fry	6	11
(Vietnam) Phùng Nguyễn PN	21	21
(Macau) J Lee	8	11
(Czech Republic) D Koukalová	21	21
(England) S Walker	21	15	21
(Hong Kong) Cheung NY	9	21	7
(South Korea) Kim H-n
(Sri Lanka) S Dahanayake	wo

Second round
3/4	(China) Han L	21	21
(Japan) Y Oku	8	16
(Vietnam) Phùng Nguyễn PN	21	15	18
(Czech Republic) D Koukalová	21	21
9/16	(Denmark) K Jørgensen	21	21
(New Zealand) D Barry	8	13
(England) S Walker	wo
(South Korea) Kim H-n

Third round
3/4	(China) Han L	21	21
(Czech Republic) D Koukalova	10	7
9/16	(Denmark) K Jørgensen	15	15
(South Korea) Kim H-n	21	21

Fourth round
3/4	(China) Han L	21	21
(South Korea) Kim H-n	15	11

==== Section 4 ====
First round
(Mongolia) K Baatar	1	5
(Bulgaria) R Ivanova	21	21
(Egypt) H Hosny	18	16
(Ukraine) M Martynenko	21	21
(Sweden) A Högström	19	21	21
(United States) R Wang	21	19	8
(India) A Pantawane
(Pakistan) P Bashir	wo

Second round
5/8	(South Korea) Kim M-h	21	21
(Singapore) S Sari	12	5
(Bulgaria) R Ivanova	15	10
(Ukraine) M Martynenko	21	21
9/16	(Thailand) P Buranaprasertsuk	21	21
(Canada) A Man	15	12
(Sweden) A Högström	15	19
(India) A Pantawane	21	21

Third round
5/8	(South Korea) Kim M-h	21	21
(Ukraine) M Martynenko	8	12
9/16	(Thailand) P Buranaprasertsuk	21	18	21
(India) A Pantawane	14	21	19

Fourth round
5/8	(South Korea) Kim M-h	21	21
9/16	(Thailand) P Buranaprasertsuk	11	18

=== Bottom Half ===
==== Section 5 ====
First round
(Netherlands) Y Wong
(Mongolia) E Bat-Erden	WO
(Malaysia) S Sukumaran	21	21
(South Africa) S Johnson	16	10
(Canada) G Desjardins	21	12	7
(Indonesia) S Kurniawan	16	21	21
(Thailand) K Ancheera	21	21
(Egypt) N El Bana	8	5
(Australia) L Choo	16	17
(Russia) V Slobodyanyuk	21	21

Second round
(Netherlands) Y Wong	17	5
(Malaysia) S Sukumaran	21	21
(Indonesia) S Kurniawan	14	21	16
9/16	(India) S Nehwal	21	18	21
(Thailand) K Ancheera	13	21	21
(Russia) V Slobodyanyuk	21	17	16
(Ukraine) O Mashchenko	10	9
5/8	(South Korea) Jang S-y	21	21

Third round
(Malaysia) S Sukumaran	8	7
9/16	(India) S Nehwal	21	21
(Thailand) K Ancheera	16	22	16
5/8	(South Korea) Jang S-y	21	20	21

Fourth round
9/16	(India) S Nehwal	21	21
5/8	(South Korea) Jang S-y	17	16

==== Section 6 ====
First round
(Germany) L Deichgräber	14	12
(Czech Republic) K Ludíková	21	21
(Japan) M Fujii	21	19	21
(Denmark) A Hald Jensen	12	21	11
(New Zealand) J Jonggowisastro	23	21
(United States) C Chow	21	13
(Hong Kong) Chan TK	21	21
(Sweden) J Carlsson	8	11

Second round
(Czech Republic) K Ludíková	15	6
(Japan) M Fujii	21	21
(Macau) Lao IK	9	8
9/16	(Malaysia) Tee JY	21	21
(New Zealand) J Jonggowisastro	9	15
(Hong Kong) Chan TK	21	21
(Ukraine) O Chkheidze	9	10
3/4	(China) Liu J	21	21

Third round
(Japan) M Fujii	21	21
9/16	(Malaysia) Tee JY	9	8
(Hong Kong) Chan TK	10	9
3/4	(China) Liu J	21	21

Fourth round
(Japan) M Fujii	19	21	18
3/4	(China) Liu J	21	11	21

==== Section 7 ====
First round
(Japan) M Taruno
(Philippines) M Laurel	WO
(Russia) A Panushkina	10	15
(Netherlands) S Barning	21	21
(Japan) E Tamaki	21	21
(India) A Ponnappa	14	16
(Australia) V Na	12	13
(Turkey) E Epice	21	21

Second round
(Japan) M Taruno	21	21
(Netherlands) S Barning	13	8
(New Zealand) E Rodgers	3	10
9/16	(Singapore) Xing AY	21	21
(Japan) E Tamaki	21	21
(Turkey) E Epice	12	14
(Pakistan) S Khan	10	3
5/8	(China) Cheng W	21	21

Third round
(Japan) M Taruno	21	17	21
9/16	(Singapore) Xing AY	18	21	12
(Japan) E Tamaki	18	15
5/8	(China) Cheng W	21	21

Fourth round
(Japan) M Taruno	21	11	6
5/8	(China) Cheng W	16	21	21

==== Section 8 ====
First round
(Bulgaria) G Banova	21	20	12
(United States) L Todt	6	22	21
(Thailand) C Julrattanamanee	4	17
(South Korea) Bae Y-j	21	21
(Macau) Lao MH	7	7
(Vietnam) Vũ TT	21	21
(Sri Lanka) L Lokugamhewa	WO
(Chinese Taipei) Chiang P-h

Second round
(United States) L Todt	3	11
(South Korea) Bae Y-j	21	21
(Indonesia) A Yuswandari	12	21	21
9/16	(England) M Cheung	21	10	13
(Vietnam) Vũ TT	7	6
(Chinese Taipei) Chiang P-h	21	21
(Germany) N Voigt	8	10
2	(Malaysia) L Cheah	21	21

Third round
(South Korea) Bae Y-j	18	21	21
(Indonesia) A Yuswandari	21	16	17
(Chinese Taipei) Chiang P-h	7	22	16
2	(Malaysia) L Cheah	21	20	21

Fourth round
(South Korea) Bae Y-j	21	17	21
2	(Malaysia) L Cheah	11	21	17
