= 2006 BWF World Junior Championships – Boys' singles =

2006 BWF World Junior Championships Boys' singles
Tournament details
- Dates: 6 November 2006 – 11 November 2006
- Edition: 8th
- Level: International
- Venue: Samsan World Gymnasium
- Location: Incheon, South Korea

The Boys' Singles tournament of the 2006 BWF World Junior Championships is a badminton world junior individual championships for the Eye Level Cups, held on November 6–11. The defending champion of the last edition is Chen Jin from China. The host player Hong Ji-hoon won the gold medal in this event after beat Tommy Sugiarto of Indonesia in the rubber game with the score 21–13, 10–21, 21–16.

== Seeded ==
1. (Japan) Kenichi Tago (quarter-final)
2. (South Korea) Han Ki-Hoon (quarter-final)
3. (Malaysia) Mohd Arif Abdul Latif (fourth round)
4. (Indonesia) Tommy Sugiarto (final)
5. (China) Chen Tianyu (third round)
6. (China) Lu Qicheng (semi-final)
7. (Malaysia) Teo Kok Siang (third round)
8. (Singapore) Derek Wong Zi Liang (fourth round)
9. (Denmark) Mads Conrad-Petersen (fourth round)
10. (South Korea) Hong Ji-Hoon (champion)
11. (China) Wen Kai (second round)
12. (Malaysia) Lim Fang Yang (fourth round)
13. (Japan) Naohiro Matsukawa (quarter-final)
14. (Netherlands) Lester Oey (second round)
15. (Australia) Jeff Tho (third round)
16. (Hong Kong) Wong Shu Ki (second round)

== Draw ==
=== Finals ===
Quarterfinals
1 | (Japan) Kenichi Tago | 16 | 22 | 14
(China) Zhou Wenlong | 21 | 20 | 21
(Malaysia) Kishan Kumar Ananthakrishna | 16 | 18
9/16 | (South Korea) Hong Ji-Hoon | 21 | 21
9/16 | (Japan) Naohiro Matsukawa | 9 | 11
3/4 | (Indonesia) Tommy Sugiarto | 21 | 21
5/8 | (China) Lu Qicheng | 21 | 21
2 | (South Korea) Han Ki-Hoon | 16 | 17

Semifinals
(China) Zhou Wenlong | 21 | 8 | 19
9/16 | (South Korea) Hong Ji-Hoon | 16 | 21 | 21
3/4 | (Indonesia) Tommy Sugiarto | 21 | 21
5/8 | (China) Lu Qicheng | 19 | 16

Finals
9/16 | (South Korea) Hong Ji-Hoon | 21 | 10 | 21
3/4 | (Indonesia) Tommy Sugiarto | 13 | 21 | 16

=== Top half ===
==== Section 1 ====
First round
(Germany) J Zurwonne | 21 | 21
(Singapore) A Chen | 17 | 18
(Thailand) P Vilailak | 21 | 21 | 21
(Bulgaria) B Andreev | 15 | 23 | 15
(Sweden) H Fahlstrom | 14 | 17
(India) S Nandaluri | 21 | 21
(Canada) B Fultz | 21 | 21
(Netherlands) J Hilbink | 14 | 19
(Macau) Ip TF | 21 | 21
(Mongolia) B Davaasuren | 15 | 14

Second round
1 | (Japan) K Tago | 21 | 21
(Ukraine) A Burlaka | 6 | 8
(Germany) J Zurwonne | 14 | 18
(Thailand) P Vilailak | 21 | 21
9/16 | (Hong Kong) Wong SK | 14 | 20
(India) S Nandaluri | 21 | 22
(Canada) B Fultz | 21 | 18 | 20
(Macau) Ip TF | 14 | 21 | 22

Third round
1 | (Japan) K Tago | 21 | 21
(Thailand) P Vilailak | 17 | 16
(India) S Nandaluri | 21 | 21
(Macau) Ip TF | 5 | 8

Fourth round
1 | (Japan) K Tago | 21 | 21
(India) S Nandaluri | 10 | 19

==== Section 2 ====
First round
(United States) J Shu | 12 | 19
(Sri Lanka) Y Ranasinghe | 21 | 21
(Russia) E Klimkovich | 7 | 10
(China) Zhou WL | 21 | 21
(Chinese Taipei) Chang W-H | 21 | 21
(Philippines) J Co | 16 | 15
(Vietnam) Duong BD | 21 | 21
(Cambodia) B Chendavongsei | 8 | 12
(India) R Saha | 21 | 21
(New Zealand) K Dennerly-Minturn | 18 | 4
(Australia) S Gunaratne
(Russia) I Sozonov | WO

Second round
5/8 | (China) Chen TY | 21 | 21
(Sri Lanka) Y Ranasinghe | 13 | 11
(China) Zhou WL | 21 | 21
(Chinese Taipei) Chang W-H | 17 | 19
9/16 | (Malaysia) Lim FY | 21 | 21
(Vietnam) Duong BD | 10 | 16
(India) R Saha | 21 | 21
(Australia) S Gunaratne | 13 | 17

Third round
5/8 | (China) Chen TY | 20 | 9
(China) Zhou WL | 22 | 21
9/16 | (Malaysia) Lim FY | 21 | 21
(India) R Saha | 11 | 13

Fourth round
(China) Zhou WL | 21 | 21
9/16 | (Malaysia) Lim FY | 17 | 13

==== Section 3 ====
First round
(Vietnam) Duong PN | 21 | 21
(Cambodia) E Davin | 12 | 5
(Japan) T Ueda | 21 | 21
(Denmark) C Larsen | 9 | 11
(Malaysia) KK Ananthakrishnan | 21 | 21
(South Africa) R Brown | 7 | 8
(Macau) Lei T | 5 | 14
(Chinese Taipei) Hsu J-H | 21 | 21
(New Zealand) H Tam | 21 | 21
(Sri Lanka) R Dhanayaka | 12 | 18

Second round
3/4 | (Malaysia) A Abdul Latif | 21 | 21
(Pakistan) M Ali | 8 | 14
(Vietnam) Duong PN | 16 | 9
(Japan) T Ueda | 21 | 21
9/16 | (Netherlands) L Oey | 7 | 21 | 18
(Malaysia) KK Ananthakrishnan | 21 | 19 | 21
(Chinese Taipei) Hsu J-H | 21 | 21
(New Zealand) H Tam | 10 | 11

Third round
3/4 | (Malaysia) A Abdul Latif | 21 | 17 | 21
(Japan) T Ueda | 11 | 21 | 14
(Malaysia) KK Ananthakrishnan | 21 | 21 | 21
(Chinese Taipei) Hsu J-H | 16 | 21 | 14

Fourth round
3/4 | (Malaysia) A Abdul Latif | 10 | 18
(Malaysia) KK Ananthakrishnan | 21 | 21

==== Section 4 ====
First round
(Czech Republic) O Kopriva | 21 | 21
(Egypt) R Ibrahim | 14 | 14
(Indonesia) B Pamungkas | 21 | 21
(United States) H Shu | 9 | 17
(Canada) J Rogers | 21 | 17 | 21
(England) V Liew | 9 | 21 | 8
(United States) B Hussey | 21 | 21
(Canada) A Cheong | 19 | 12
(Turkey) G Kundakci | 21 | 16 | 21
(Macau) Lam CM | 9 | 21 | 16
(India) A Dewalkar | 21 | 21
(Bulgaria) I Krastev | 11 | 9

Second round
5/8 | (Singapore) D Wong | 21 | 21
(Czech Republic) O Kopriva | 11 | 8
(Indonesia) B Pamungkas | 21 | 21
(Canada) J Rogers | 5 | 14
9/16 | (South Korea) Hong J-H | 21 | 21
(United States) B Hussey | 5 | 3
(Turkey) G Kundakci | 17 | 15
(India) A Dewalkar | 21 | 21

Third round
5/8 | (Singapore) D Wong | 19 | 21 | 21
(Indonesia) B Pamungkas | 21 | 16 | 13
9/16 | (South Korea) Hong J-H | 21 | 21
(India) A Dewalkar | 9 | 10

Fourth round
5/8 | (Singapore) D Wong | 18 | 16
9/16 | (South Korea) Hong J-H | 21 | 21

=== Bottom half ===
==== Section 5 ====
First round
(Indonesia) N Saputro | 16 | 21 | 19
(Canada) D Snider | 21 | 19 | 21
(Mongolia) Z Munkhbaatar | 7 | 9
(Sweden) G Ulldahl | 21 | 21
(Germany) S Rduch | 21 | 15 | 21
(Australia) B Ma | 14 | 21 | 11
(Thailand) T Saensomboonsuk | 21 | 21
(Japan) S Wada | 17 | 10
(New Zealand) J Eunson | 17 | 21 | 21
(Pakistan) Z Ghazali | 21 | 6 | 13
(Macau) Lei K | 13 | 7
(Hong Kong) K Cai | 21 | 21

Second round
(Canada) D Snider | 13 | 16
(Sweden) G Ulldahl | 21 | 21
(Germany) S Rduch | 21 | 18 | 17
9/16 | (Japan) N Matsukawa | 14 | 21 | 21
(Thailand) T Saensomboonsuk | 21 | 21
(New Zealand) J Eunson | 7 | 11
(Hong Kong) K Cai | 16 | 10
5/8 | (Malaysia) Teo KS | 21 | 21

Third round
(Sweden) G Ulldahl | 19 | 21 | 15
9/16 | (Japan) N Matsukawa | 21 | 17 | 21
(Thailand) T Saensomboonsuk | 21 | 21
5/8 | (Malaysia) Teo KS | 16 | 18

Fourth round
9/16 | (Japan) N Matsukawa | 21 | 21
(Thailand) T Saensomboonsuk | 13 | 19

==== Section 6 ====
First round
(New Zealand) E Haggo | 21 | 21
(Egypt) M El Sead | 8 | 12
(Russia) V Pivchenkov | 21 | 21
(Sri Lanka) G Jayawardena | 14 | 18
(Germany) F Hammes | 3 | 14
(South Korea) Shin B-C | 21 | 21
(Peru) A De Vinatea | 13 | 15
(India) J Sanyal | 21 | 21
(Ukraine) G Natarov | 17 | 17
(Singapore) Thng BS | 21 | 21

Second round
(New Zealand) E Haggo | 16 | 21 | 12
(Russia) V Pivchenkov | 21 | 12 | 21
(South Korea) Shin B-C | 21 | 21
9/16 | (China) Wen K | 7 | 18
(India) J Sanyal | 19 | 21 | 21
(Singapore) Thng BS | 21 | 15 | 7
(Vietnam) Nguyen QT | 4 | 9
3/4 | (Indonesia) T Sugiarto | 21 | 21

Third round
(Russia) V Pivchenkov | 9 | 13
(South Korea) Shin B-C | 21 | 21
(India) J Sanyal | 19 | 13
3/4 | (Indonesia) T Sugiarto | 21 | 21

Fourth round
(South Korea) Shin B-C | 14 | 21 | 11
3/4 | (Indonesia) T Sugiarto | 21 | 14 | 21

==== Section 7 ====
First round
(South Africa) R Abrahams | 21 | 21
(Cambodia) M Chanthan | 16 | 13
(United States) A Setiadi | 21 | 21
(Singapore) Chen GR | 5 | 12
(Ukraine) D Zavadsky | 21 | 15 | 21
(Russia) N Khakimov | 9 | 21 | 15
(Cambodia) V Chanpisey | 9 | 8
(Finland) M Pyykönen | 21 | 21
(Germany) P Kaesbauer | 19 | 12
(Turkey) H Durakcan | 21 | 21
(Malaysia) Lok CC | 21 | 21
(Hong Kong) Lau CY | 8 | 15

Second round
(South Africa) R Abrahams | 14 | 21 | 16
(United States) A Setiadi | 21 | 15 | 21
(Ukraine) D Zavadsky | 18 | 18
9/16 | (Denmark) M Conrad-Petersen | 21 | 21
(Finland) M Pyykönen | 13 | 20
(Turkey) H Durakcan | 21 | 22
(Malaysia) Lok CC | 11 | 9
5/8 | (China) Lu QC | 21 | 21

Third round
(United States) A Setiadi | 13 | 3
9/16 | (Denmark) M Conrad-Petersen | 21 | 21
(Turkey) H Durakcan | 14 | 8
5/8 | (China) Lu QC | 21 | 21

Fourth round
9/16 | (Denmark) M Conrad-Petersen | 18 | 19
5/8 | (China) Lu QC | 21 | 21

==== Section 8 ====
First round
(Sri Lanka) T Perera | 9 | 22 | 15
(Vietnam) Pham NT | 21 | 20 | 21
(Indonesia) D Rumbaka | 15 | 21 | 21
(Chinese Taipei) Lin Y-J | 21 | 15 | 15
(Netherlands) S Branderhorst | 21 | 10 | 11
(Czech Republic) J Bitman | 19 | 21 | 21
(Chinese Taipei) Lu C-Y | 21 | 21
(Philippines) A Gadi | 10 | 12
(Australia) E Tanaka | 14 | 7
(Bulgaria) T Hadzhiev | 21 | 21

Second round
(Vietnam) Pham NT | 22 | 13 | 16
(Indonesia) D Rumbaka | 20 | 21 | 21
(Czech Republic) J Bitman | 16 | 10
9/16 | (Australia) J Tho | 21 | 21
(Chinese Taipei) Lu C-Y | 21 | 21
(Bulgaria) T Hadzhiev | 15 | 8
(Pakistan) W Zahid | 3 | 4
2 | (South Korea) Han K-H | 21 | 21

Third round
(Indonesia) D Rumbaka | 21 | 21
9/16 | (Australia) J Tho | 9 | 14
(Chinese Taipei) Lu C-Y | 13 | 17
2 | (South Korea) Han K-H | 21 | 21

Fourth round
(Indonesia) D Rumbaka | 17 | 8
2 | (South Korea) Han K-H | 21 | 21
