= Gu Juan =

Chinese-born Singaporean badminton player (born 1990)

Gu Juan 顾娟
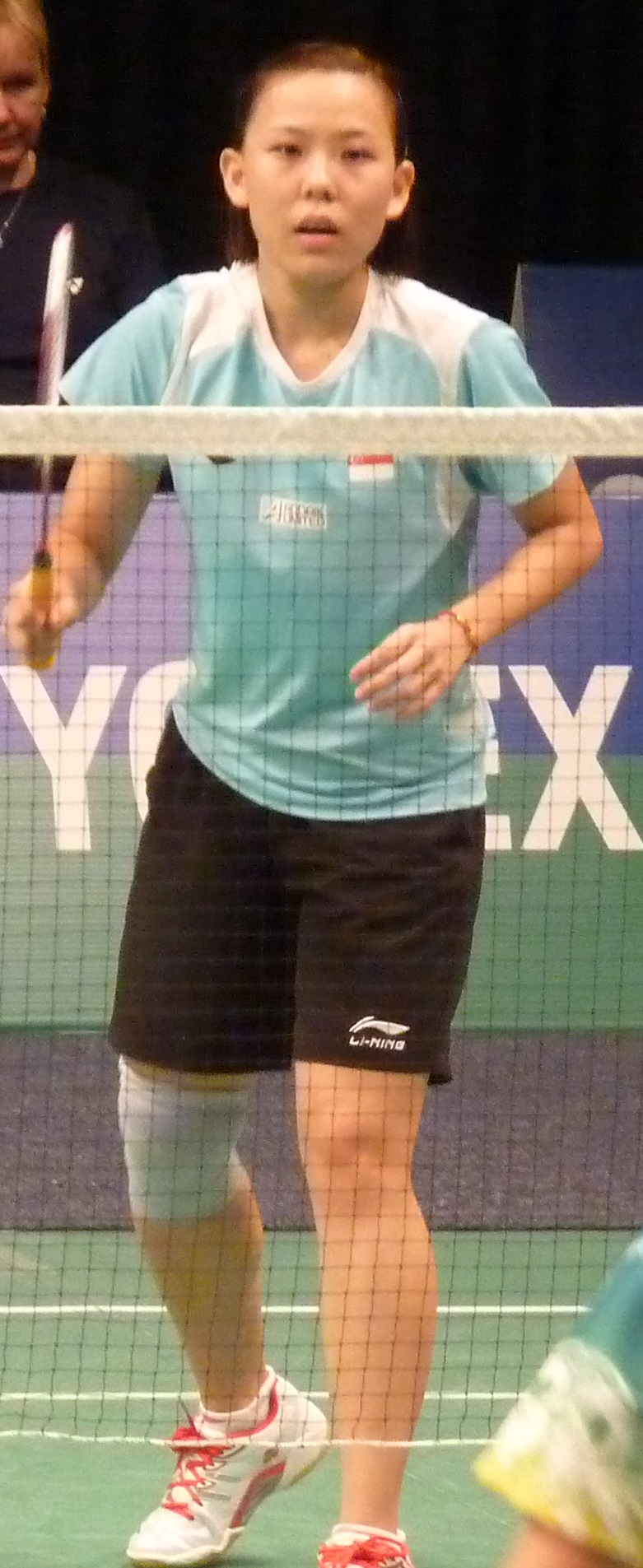

Personal information
- Born: 26 May 1990 (age 36) Dafeng, Jiangsu, China
- Height: 1.60 m (5 ft 3 in)
- Weight: 56 kg (123 lb)

Sport
- Country: Singapore
- Sport: Badminton
- Coached by: Luan Jin

Women's Singles
- Highest ranking: 15 (20 December 2012)
- BWF profile
Medal record
Women's badminton
Representing Singapore
Southeast Asian Games
Silver medal – second place	2007 Nakhon Ratchasima	Women's team
Bronze medal – third place	2011 Jakarta–Palembang	Women's team
World Junior Championships
Bronze medal – third place	2007 Waitakere City	Girls singles
Bronze medal – third place	2007 Waitakere City	Mixed team
Asian Junior Championships
Silver medal – second place	2007 Kuala Lumpur	Girls' singles

Gu Juan (Chinese: 顾娟; born 26 May 1990) is a Chinese-born Singaporean badminton player who competed at the 2012 Summer Olympics.

== Early life ==
Gu followed her father to Nanjing when she was six years old. Due to poor body constitution, her father sent her to a badminton school to build her up. Gu represented Nanjing and won a competition. She was subsequently invited to join the Beijing badminton team but withdrew after not being used to the weather conditions. Gu then further represented Nanjing in the Jiangsu sports competition and won the girls doubles and mixed doubles. Former Jiangsu badminton coach, representing the Singapore Badminton Association, scouted her and invited her to Singapore.

== Career ==
Gu came to Singapore in 2003 under the Foreign Sports Talent Scheme and became a Singapore citizen in June 2007.

Gu was part of the Singapore women's team who won the silver medal at the 2007 Southeast Asian Games held in Thailand. In 2012, Gu was selected as Singapore's only Olympic women's singles player for the 2012 Summer Olympics by the Singapore Badminton Association, ahead of Southeast Asian Games women's singles champion Fu Mingtian. At the 2012 Olympics, she qualified from her group before losing to Cheng Shao-chieh.

Gu resigned from the Singapore national team on 30 April 2014, citing injuries, tending to her aged parents and lack of progress in Singapore. Gu went to Shanghai for further studies. Sixteen months later after her resignation, she was persuaded by the Singapore national badminton team's head coach to re-join the national team.

== Awards ==
Gu received the 2013 Meritorious Award from the Singapore National Olympic Committee.

== Achievements ==
=== BWF World Junior Championships ===
Girls' singles
Year	Venue	Opponent	Score	Result
2007	The Trusts Stadium; Waitakere City, New Zealand	(China) Wang Lin	14–21, 14–21	Bronze

=== Asian Junior Championships ===
Girls' singles
Year	Venue	Opponent	Score	Result
2007	Stadium Juara; Kuala Lumpur, Malaysia	(China) Liu Xin	7–21, 21–15, 16–21	Silver

=== BWF Grand Prix ===
The BWF Grand Prix had two levels, the BWF Grand Prix and Grand Prix Gold. It was a series of badminton tournaments sanctioned by the Badminton World Federation (BWF) which was held from 2007 to 2017.

Women's singles
Year	Tournament	Opponent	Score	Result
2013	Malaysia Grand Prix Gold	(India) P. V. Sindhu	17–21, 21–17, 19–21	(silver) Runner-up
2013	Dutch Open	(Thailand) Busanan Ongbamrungphan	12–21, 12–21	(silver) Runner-up

BWF Grand Prix Gold tournament
BWF Grand Prix tournament

=== BWF International Challenge/Series ===
Women's singles
Year	Tournament	Opponent	Score	Result
2007	Waikato International	(Singapore) Fu Mingtian	14–21, 17–21	(silver) Runner-up
2010	Banuinvest International	(Japan) Hitomi Oka	23–25, 21–15, 4–21	(silver) Runner-up
2010	Vietnam International	(South Korea) Lee Hyun-jin	19–21, 15–21	(silver) Runner-up
2011	New Zealand International	(Japan) Sayaka Sato	14–21, 13–21	(silver) Runner-up
2011	Singapore International	(Singapore) Xing Aiying	10–21, 12–21	(silver) Runner-up

Women's doubles
Year	Tournament	Partner	Opponent	Score	Result
2007	Croatian International	(Singapore) Zhang Beiwen	(China) Cai Jiani (China) Guo Xin	21–15, 6–21, 10–21	(silver) Runner-up

BWF International Challenge tournament
BWF International Series tournament

== Record against selected opponents ==
Record against year-end Finals finalists, World Championships semi-finalists, and Olympic quarter-finalists

- (Australia) Victoria Na 1–0
- (Bulgaria) Petya Nedelcheva 3–3
- (China) Zhu Lin 1–0
- (China) Wang Yihan 0–4
- (China) Wang Xin 0–3
- (China) Wang Shixian 0–4
- (China) Li Xuerui 1–5
- (China) Yao Xue 0–1
- (China) Liu Xin 0–1
- (China) Wang Lin 0–1
- (Chinese Taipei) Cheng Shao-chieh 2–3
- (Chinese Taipei) Tai Tzu-ying 3–2
- (France) Pi Hongyan 1–2
- (Hong Kong) Zhou Mi 0–1
- (Hong Kong) Yip Pui Yin 2–1
- (India) Saina Nehwal 1–5
- (Indonesia) Maria Kristin Yulianti 1–0
- (Japan) Eriko Hirose 1–2
- (Japan) Sayaka Sato 1–2
- (Japan) Minatsu Mitani 0–4
- (South Korea) Bae Youn-joo 2–2
- (South Korea) Sung Ji-hyun 0–2
- (Malaysia) Wong Mew Choo 1–0
- (Slovakia) Monika Fašungová 2–0
- (Thailand) Porntip Buranaprasertsuk 2–5
- (Thailand) Ratchanok Intanon 1–3
