= Liu Xin (badminton) =

Chinese badminton player (born 1990)

Liu Xin 刘鑫
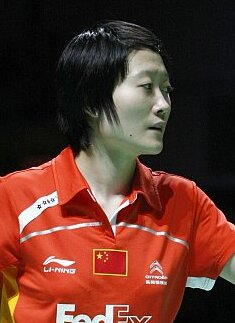
- Liu in 2011

Personal information
- Born: 11 June 1990 (age 36) Benxi, Liaoning, China
- Years active: 2005–2014
- Height: 1.71 m (5 ft 7 in)
- Weight: 60 kg (132 lb)

Sport
- Country: China
- Sport: Badminton
- Handedness: Right

Women's singles
- Highest ranking: 5 (21 April 2011)
- BWF profile
Medal record
Women's badminton
Representing China
Asian Games
Gold medal – first place	2014 Incheon	Women's team
Asian Championships
Silver medal – second place	2010 New Delhi	Women's singles
World Junior Championships
Gold medal – first place	2007 Waitakere City	Mixed team
Bronze medal – third place	2007 Waitakere City	Girls' singles
Asian Junior Championships
Gold medal – first place	2007 Kuala Lumpur	Girls' singles
Silver medal – second place	2007 Kuala Lumpur	Mixed team

Liu Xin (Chinese: 刘鑫; pinyin: Liú Xīn; born 11 June 1990) is a Chinese professional badminton singles player. Born in Benxi, Liaoning, her string of good performances during the 2010 and early 2011 helped her to attain the career-best ranking of 5 in April 2011. She was part of the Chinese team that won gold medals at the 2010 and 2014 World University Championships, and also at the 2014 Asian Games.

== Achievements ==
=== Asian Championships ===
Women's singles
Year	Venue	Opponent	Score	Result
2010	Siri Fort Indoor Stadium, New Delhi, India	(China) Li Xuerui	13–21, 21–18, 19–21	Silver

=== World University Championships ===
Women's singles
Year	Venue	Opponent	Score	Result
2010	Taipei Gymnasium, Taipei, Chinese Taipei	(China) Li Xuerui	12–21, 14–21	Silver
2014	Municipal Sport Palace Vista Alegre, Córdoba, Spain	(Chinese Taipei) Pai Yu-po	19–21, 21–12, 16–21	Silver

Women's doubles
Year	Venue	Partner	Opponent	Score	Result
2010	Taipei Gymnasium, Taipei, Chinese Taipei	(China) Li Xuerui	(China) Cheng Shu (China) Ma Jin	Walkover	Silver

=== BWF World Junior Championships ===
Girls' singles
Year	Venue	Opponent	Score	Result
2007	The Trusts Stadium, Waitakere City, New Zealand	(South Korea) Bae Youn-joo	13–21, 21–16, 16–21	Bronze

=== Asian Junior Championships ===
Girls' singles
Year	Venue	Opponent	Score	Result
2007	Stadium Juara, Kuala Lumpur, Malaysia	(Singapore) Gu Juan	21–7, 15–21, 21–16	Gold

=== BWF Superseries ===
The BWF Superseries, launched on 14 December 2006 and implemented in 2007, is a series of elite badminton tournaments, sanctioned by Badminton World Federation (BWF). BWF Superseries has two level such as Superseries and Superseries Premier. A season of Superseries features twelve tournaments around the world, which introduced since 2011, with successful players invited to the BWF Superseries Finals held at the year end.

Women's singles
Year	Tournament	Opponent	Score	Result
2010	Denmark Open	(China) Wang Yihan	14–21, 12–21	(silver) Runner-up
2013	China Masters	(Thailand) Porntip Buranaprasertsuk	21–4, 13–21, 21–12	(gold) Winner

BWF Super Series Finals tournament
BWF Super Series Premier tournament
BWF Super Series tournament

=== BWF Grand Prix ===
The BWF Grand Prix has two levels, the BWF Grand Prix and Grand Prix Gold. It is a series of badminton tournaments sanctioned by the Badminton World Federation (BWF) since 2007.

Women's singles
Year	Tournament	Opponent	Score	Result
2010	Bitburger Open	(Macau) Wang Rong	21–16, 21–10	(gold) Winner
2010	Korea Grand Prix	(China) Li Xuerui	21–9, 21–14	(gold) Winner
2011	German Open	(Japan) Ayane Kurihara	21–13, 15–21, 21–9	(gold) Winner
2011	Australian Open	(Thailand) Porntip Buranaprasertsuk	21–14, 21–9	(gold) Winner
2014	China Masters	(China) Shen Yaying	21–12, 21–18	(gold) Winner
2014	Chinese Taipei Open	(South Korea) Sung Ji-hyun	13–21, 18–21	(silver) Runner-up

BWF Grand Prix Gold tournament
BWF Grand Prix tournament

=== BWF International Challenge/Series ===
Women's singles
Year	Tournament	Opponent	Score	Result
2014	China International	(China) Hui Xirui	21–15, 21–17	(gold) Winner

BWF International Challenge tournament
BWF International Series tournament

== Record against selected opponents ==
Record against year-end Finals finalists, World Championships semi-finalists, and Olympic quarter-finalists.

Players	Matches	Results		Difference
Players	Matches	Won	Lost	Difference
(Bulgaria) Petya Nedelcheva	1	1	0	+1
(China) Li Xuerui	6	3	3	0
(China) Wang Shixian	2	1	1	0
(China) Wang Yihan	7	0	7	–7
(China) Zhu Lin	1	1	0	+1
(Chinese Taipei) Cheng Shao-chieh	3	2	1	+1
(Chinese Taipei) Tai Tzu-ying	4	2	2	0
(Denmark) Tine Baun	1	0	1	–1
(France) Pi Hongyan	2	2	0	+2
(Germany) Juliane Schenk	4	2	2	0

Players	Matches	Results		Difference
Players	Matches	Won	Lost	Difference
(Hong Kong) Yip Pui Yin	3	3	0	+3
(Hong Kong) Zhou Mi	1	1	0	+1
(India) Saina Nehwal	2	0	2	–2
(Japan) Minatsu Mitani	1	1	0	+1
(Japan) Nozomi Okuhara	1	1	0	+1
(Malaysia) Wong Mew Choo	1	0	1	–1
(South Korea) Bae Yeon-ju	5	5	0	+5
(South Korea) Sung Ji-hyun	4	2	2	0
(Thailand) Porntip Buranaprasertsuk	3	3	0	+3
(Thailand) Ratchanok Intanon	6	4	2	+2
