= 2006 BWF World Junior Championships =

Tournament details
- Dates: November 2, 2006 - November 11, 2006
- Edition: 8th
- Level: International
- Venue: Samsan World Gymnasium
- Location: Incheon, South Korea

The 2006 BWF World Junior Championships is the eight tournament of the BWF World Junior Championships. It was held in Incheon, South Korea at the Samsan World Gymnasium, between 2–11 November 2006.

== Medalists ==
| Event | Gold | Silver | Bronze |
|---|---|---|---|
| Boys singles | (South Korea) Hong Ji-Hoon | (Indonesia) Tommy Sugiarto | (China) Zhou Wenlong |
| Boys singles | (South Korea) Hong Ji-Hoon | (Indonesia) Tommy Sugiarto | (China) Lu Qicheng |
| Girls singles | (China) Wang Yihan | (India) Saina Nehwal | (South Korea) Kim Moon-Hi |
| Girls singles | (China) Wang Yihan | (India) Saina Nehwal | (South Korea) Bae Youn-Joo |
| Boys doubles | (South Korea) Lee Yong-Dae (South Korea) Cho Gun-Woo | (China) Liu Xiaolong (China) Li Tian | (Malaysia) Lim Khim Wah (Malaysia) Mak Hee Chun |
| Boys doubles | (South Korea) Lee Yong-Dae (South Korea) Cho Gun-Woo | (China) Liu Xiaolong (China) Li Tian | (South Korea) Kim Ki-Jung (South Korea) Lee Jung-Hwan |
| Girls doubles | (China) Ma Jin (China) Wang Xiaoli | (South Korea) Hong Soo-Jung (South Korea) Sun In-Jang | (Indonesia) Pia Zebadiah (Indonesia) Nitya Krishinda Maheswari |
| Girls doubles | (China) Ma Jin (China) Wang Xiaoli | (South Korea) Hong Soo-Jung (South Korea) Sun In-Jang | (China) Wang Siyun (China) Liao Jingmei |
| Mixed doubles | (South Korea) Lee Yong-Dae (South Korea) Yoo Hyun-Young | (China) Li Tian (China) Ma Jin | (China) Liu Xiaolong (China) Liao Jingmei |
| Mixed doubles | (South Korea) Lee Yong-Dae (South Korea) Yoo Hyun-Young | (China) Li Tian (China) Ma Jin | (China) Hu Wenqing (China) Wang Xiaoli |
| Teams | (South Korea) South Korea; Hong Ji-hoon; Han Ki-hoon; Shin Baek-cheol; Park Sung-min; Lee Yong-dae; Cho Gun-woo; Lee Jung-hwan; Kim Gi-jung; Jang Soo-young; Kim Moon-hi; Bae Youn-joo; Kim Ha-na; Hong Soo-jung; Sun In-jang; Yoo Hyun-young | (China) China; Wang Yihan; Liu Jie; Han Li; Cheng Wen; Wang Xiaoli; Ma Jin; Wang Siyun; Liao Jingmei; Lu Qicheng; Wen Kai; Zhou Wenlong; Chen Tianyu; Li Tian; Liu Xiaolong; Hu Wenqing | (Malaysia) Malaysia; Mohd Arif Abdul Latif; Mak Hee Chun; Lim Khim Wah; Tan Wee Kiong; Teo Kok Siang; Lydia Cheah Li Ya; Woon Khe Wei; Goh Liu Ying; Amelia Alicia Anscelly; Vountus Indra Mawan; Lok Chong Chieh; Tee Jing Yi; Lim Fang Yang; Ooi Swee Wenn |

== Team competition ==
A total of 28 countries competed at the team competition in 2006 BWF World Junior Championships.

=== Final positions ===
1. South Korea
2. China
3. Malaysia
4. Indonesia
5. Japan
6. Singapore
7. Thailand
8. India
9. Chinese Taipei
10. England
11. Germany
12. Russia
13. Denmark
14. Netherlands
15. Czech Republic
16. Turkey (Debut)
17. Hong Kong
18. Ukraine (Debut)
19. Vietnam (Debut)
20. United States
21. Canada
22. Bulgaria
23. New Zealand
24. Australia
25. Philippines (Debut)
26. Pakistan (Debut)
27. South Africa
28. Egypt (Debut)

=== Final Round ===
(South Korea)
South Korea
3
Incheon, South Korea
November 5, 2006
(China)
China
2

| | | | 1 | 2 | 3 |
|---|---|---|---|---|---|
| 1 | (South Korea) (China) | Lee Yong-Dae / Yoo Hyun-Young; Liu Xiaolong / Liao Jingmei | 21; 8 | 21; 14 |
| 2 | (South Korea) (China) | Jang Soo-Young; Wang Yihan | 15; 21 | 20; 22 |
| 3 | (South Korea) (China) | Han Ki-Hoon; Lu Qicheng | 21; 18 | 13; 21 | 21; 13 |
| 4 | (South Korea) (China) | Hong Soo-Jung / Sun In-Jang; Wang Xiaoli / Ma Jin | 19; 21 | 19; 21 |
| 5 | (South Korea) (China) | Lee Yong-Dae / Cho Gun-Woo; Liu Xiaolong / Li Tian | 21; 14 | 21; 17 |

== Medal table ==
| Rank | Nation | Gold | Silver | Bronze | Total |
|---|---|---|---|---|---|
| 1 | South Korea | 4 | 1 | 3 | 8 |
| 2 | China | 2 | 3 | 5 | 10 |
| 3 | Indonesia | 0 | 1 | 1 | 2 |
| 4 | India | 0 | 1 | 0 | 1 |
| 5 | Malaysia | 0 | 0 | 2 | 2 |
