= 2006 BWF World Junior Championships – Girls' doubles =

2006 BWF World Junior Championships Girls' doubles
Tournament details
- Dates: 6 November 2006 – 11 November 2006
- Edition: 8th
- Level: International
- Venue: Samsan World Gymnasium
- Location: Incheon, South Korea

The Girls' doubles tournament of the 2006 BWF World Junior Championships is a badminton world junior individual championships for the Eye Level Cups, held on November 6–11. The defending champion of the last edition were Tian Qing and Yu Yang from China. The Chinese pair Ma Jin and Wang Xiaoli won the gold medal in this event after beat Hong Soo-jung and Sun In-jang of South Korea in straight games with the score 21–13, 21–18.

== Seeded ==
1. (China) Ma Jin / Wang Xiaoli (champion)
2. (China) Wang Siyun / Liao Jingmei (semi-final)
3. (Indonesia) Lily Siswanti / Richi Puspita Dili (second round)
4. (Chinese Taipei) Hsieh Pei-chen / Lee Tai-an (quarter-final)
5. (New Zealand) Danielle Barry / Emma Rodgers (second round)
6. (Thailand) Chanida Julrattanamanee / Ancheera Kittitharakul (third round)
7. (Australia) Erica Pong / Victoria Na (second round)
8. (England) Gabrielle White / Mariana Agathangelou (third round)

== Draw ==
=== Finals ===
Semifinals				Finals
1	(China) Ma Jin (China) Wang Xiaoli	21	21
	(Indonesia) Pia Zebadiah Bernadet (Indonesia) Nitya Krishinda Maheswari	14	17	1	(China) Ma Jin (China) Wang Xiaoli	21	21
	(South Korea) Hong Soo-jung (South Korea) Sun In-jang	23	21		(South Korea) Hong Soo-jung (South Korea) Sun In-jang	13	18
2	(China) Wang Siyun (China) Liao Jingmei	21	9

=== Top half ===
==== Section 1 ====
First round
(Malaysia) Ooi SW (Malaysia) A Anscelly	21	21
(Turkey) E Epice (Turkey) Ö Çalışkan	13	12
(United States) C Chow (United States) R Wang	12	12
(Hong Kong) Chan TK (Hong Kong) Tse YS	21	21
(South Korea) Yoo H-y (South Korea) Jung K-e	21	21
(Russia) V Yushkova (Russia) V Slobodyanyuk	7	8
(Singapore) Thng TT (Singapore) J Poo	6	16
(India) A Ponnappa (India) N Sasale	21	21

Second round
1	(China) Ma J (China) Wang XL	21	21
(Japan) M Taruno (Japan) S Uchida	11	9
(Malaysia) Ooi SW (Malaysia) A Anscelly	19	21	25
(Hong Kong) Chan TK (Hong Kong) Tse YS	21	16	23
5/8	(New Zealand) D Barry (New Zealand) E Rodgers	16	7
(Germany) N Voigt (Germany) L Deichgräber	21	21
(South Korea) Yoo H-y (South Korea) Jung K-e	21	21
(India) A Ponnappa (India) N Sasale	15	9

Third round
1	(China) Ma J (China) Wang XL	21	21
(Malaysia) Ooi SW (Malaysia) A Anscelly	14	9
(Germany) N Voigt (Germany) L Deichgräber	10	15
(South Korea) Yoo H-y (South Korea) Jung K-e	21	21

Quarter finals
1	(China) Ma J (China) Wang XL	21	16	21
(South Korea) Yoo H-y (South Korea) Jung K-e	19	21	13

==== Section 2 ====
First round
(South Africa) J Fry (South Africa) S Johnson	15	10
(Canada) G Desjardins (Canada) C Cheung	21	21
(Sweden) A Högström (Sweden) J Carlsson
(England) S Walker (England) S Ward	WO
(Macau) Lao IM (Macau) Lao IK	5	15
(Netherlands) S Barning (Netherlands) P Stolzenbach	21	21
(Indonesia) P Zebadiah (Indonesia) N Maheswari	21	21
(Denmark) L Kruse (Denmark) M Tharbeerg	17	18

Second round
3/4	(Chinese Taipei) Hsieh P-c (Chinese Taipei) Lee T-a	21	21
(Philippines) K Velez (Philippines) M Laurel	14	7
(Canada) G Desjardins (Canada) C Cheung	17	17
(Sweden) A Högström (Sweden) J Carlsson	21	21
5/8	(Australia) E Pong (Australia) V Na	9	9
(Czech Republic) K Ludíková (Czech Republic) D Koukalová	21	21
(Netherlands) S Barning (Netherlands) P Stolzenbach	21	13
(Indonesia) P Zebadiah (Indonesia) N Maheswari	23	21

Third round
3/4	(Chinese Taipei) Hsieh P-c (Chinese Taipei) Lee T-a	21	21
(Sweden) A Högström (Sweden) J Carlsson	13	10
(Czech Republic) K Ludíková (Czech Republic) D Koukalová	14	11
(Indonesia) P Zebadiah (Indonesia) N Maheswari	21	21

Quarter finals
3/4	(Chinese Taipei) Hsieh P-c (Chinese Taipei) Lee T-a	16	9
(Indonesia) P Zebadiah (Indonesia) N Maheswari	21	21

=== Bottom half ===
==== Section 3 ====
First round
(Bulgaria) R Ivanova (Bulgaria) G Banova	21	22
(Hong Kong) Poon LY (Hong Kong) Cheung NY	10	20
(South Korea) Hong S-j (South Korea) Sun I-j
(New Zealand) V Copeland (New Zealand) J Jonggowisastro	WO
(Australia) A Slee (Australia) L Choo	19	19
(Russia) K Polikarpova (Russia) A Panushkina	21	21
(Singapore) S Sari (Singapore) S Ashikin	21	15	21
(Vietnam) Phùng Nguyễn PN (Vietnam) Vũ TT	12	21	11

Second round
(Bulgaria) R Ivanova (Bulgaria) G Banova	9	14
(South Korea) Hong S-j (South Korea) Sun I-j	21	21
(Pakistan) S Khan (Pakistan) P Bashir	14	15
5/8	(Thailand) C Julrattanamanee (Thailand) A Kittitharakul	21	21
(Russia) K Polikarpova (Russia) A Panushkina	10	7
(Singapore) S Sari (Singapore) S Ashikin	21	21
(Malaysia) Woon KW (Malaysia) Goh LY	23	21
3/4	(Indonesia) L Siswanti (Indonesia) R Dili	21	14

Third round
(South Korea) Hong S-j (South Korea) Sun I-j	21	21
(Thailand) C Julrattanamanee (Thailand) A Kittitharakul	9	4
(Singapore) S Sari (Singapore) S Ashikin	23	21
(Malaysia) Woon KW (Malaysia) Goh LY	21	16

Quarter finals
(South Korea) Hong S-j (South Korea) Sun I-j	21	21
(Singapore) S Sari (Singapore) S Ashikin	10	8

==== Section 4 ====
First round
(Mongolia) M Mendjargal (Mongolia) K Baatar	5	3
(Chinese Taipei) Tung H-c (Chinese Taipei) Hung S-h	21	21
(Japan) M Fujii (Japan) R Kakiiwa	21	21
(Macau) J Lee (Macau) Lao MH	3	7
(Denmark) K Jørgensen (Denmark) J Christiansen
(Sri Lanka) S Dahanayake (Sri Lanka) L Lokugamhewa	WO
(Germany) J Schmidt (Germany) M Reich	21	21
(Egypt) H Hosny (Egypt) N El Bana	10	7

Second round
(Chinese Taipei) Tung H-c (Chinese Taipei) Hung S-h	2	9
(Japan) M Fujii (Japan) R Kakiiwa	21	21
(United States) P Lun (United States) L Todt	11	7
5/8	(England) G White (England) M Agathangelou	21	21
(Denmark) K Jørgensen (Denmark) J Christiansen	21	21
(Germany) J Schmidt (Germany) M Reich	9	14
(Ukraine) O Chkheidze (Ukraine) O Mashchenko	9	8
2	(China) Wang SY (China) Liao JM	21	21

Third round
(Japan) M Fujii (Japan) R Kakiiwa	21	21
5/8	(England) G White (England) M Agathangelou	8	10
(Denmark) K Jørgensen (Denmark) J Christiansen	4	9
2	(China) Wang SY (China) Liao JM	21	21

Quarter finals
(Japan) M Fujii (Japan) R Kakiiwa	17	18
2	(China) Wang SY (China) Liao JM	21	21
