= Badminton at the 2010 Commonwealth Games – Women's singles =

Badminton – Women's singles at the 2010 Commonwealth Games
- Venue: Siri Fort Sports Complex, New Delhi, India
- Dates: 9–14 October 2010
- Competitors: 16 from 10 nations

Medalists
gold medal	Saina Nehwal	India
silver medal	Mew Wong	Malaysia
bronze medal	Elizabeth Cann	England

The Women's singles event of badminton at the 2010 Commonwealth Games was held from 9 to 14 October 2010 in Siri Fort Sports Complex, New Delhi, India.

== Seeds ==
The seeds for the tournament were:

1. Saina Nehwal (IND) (champion, gold medalist)
2. Mew Wong (MAS) (final, silver medalist)
3. Susan Egelstaff (SCO) (semifinals, fourth place)
4. Elizabeth Cann (ENG) (semifinals, bronze medalist)
5. Aditi Mutatkar (IND) (quarterfinals)
6. Anna Rice (CAN) (quarterfinals)
7. Fu Mingtian (SIN) (first round)
8. Xing Aiying (SIN) (first round)

== Results ==
=== Finals ===
Round of 16
1	(India) Saina Nehwal	21	21
(Northern Ireland) Caroline Black	0	2
6	(Canada) Anna Rice	21	21
(Guernsey) Gayle Lloyd	4	7
3	(Scotland) Susan Egelstaff	21	21
(New Zealand) Michelle Chan	11	9
(Australia) Huang Chia-chi	21	21
7	(Singapore) Fu Mingtian	15	19
(Canada) Michelle Li	23	21
8	(Singapore) Xing Aiying	21	12
4	(England) Elizabeth Cann	21	21
(New Zealand) Anna Rankin	14	13
5	(India) Aditi Mutatkar	21	21
(Scotland) Kirsty Gilmour	11	17
2	(Malaysia) Mew Wong	21	21
(Guernsey) Elena Johnson	5	10

Quarter-finals
1	Saina Nehwal (IND)	21	21
6	Anna Rice (CAN)	7	10
3	Susan Egelstaff (SCO)	21	21
Huang Chia-chi (AUS)	11	9
Michelle Li (CAN)	14	21	16
4	Elizabeth Cann (ENG)	21	19	21
5	Aditi Mutatkar (IND)	8	12
2	Mew Wong (MAS)	21	21

Semi-finals
1	Saina Nehwal (IND)	21	21
3	Susan Egelstaff (SCO)	10	17
4	Elizabeth Cann (ENG)	12	21	17
2	Mew Wong (MAS)	21	18	21

Final
1	Saina Nehwal (IND)	19	23	21
2	Mew Wong (MAS)	21	21	13
Third place
3	Susan Egelstaff (SCO)	18	16
4	Elizabeth Cann (ENG)	21	21
