= 2007 BWF World Junior Championships – girls' singles =

2007 BWF World Junior Championships girls' Singles
Tournament details
- Dates: 30 October 2007 – 4 November 2007
- Edition: 9th
- Level: International
- Venue: Waitakere Trusts Stadium
- Location: Waitakere City, New Zealand

The girls' singles event for the 2007 BWF World Junior Championships was held between 30 October and 4 November. Wang Lin of China won the title.

== Seeds ==
1. (Singapore) Xing Aiying (second round)
2. (China) Liu Xin (semi-final)
3. (China) Wang Lin (champion)
4. (Denmark) Anne Hald Jensen (third round)
5. (Netherlands) Patty Stolzenbach (second round)
6. (Singapore) Fu Mingtian (third round)
7. (Scotland) Linda Sloan (quarter-final)
8. (Indonesia) Pia Zebadiah Bernadet (quarter-final)
9. (Germany) Fabienne Deprez (second round)
10. (South Korea) Bae Youn-Joo (final)
11. (Malaysia) Lyddia Cheah (fourth round)
12. (Singapore) Gu Juan (semi-final)
13. (Thailand) Porntip Buranaprasertsuk (fourth round)
14. (Singapore) Zhang Beiwen (third round)
15. (Malaysia) Tee Jing Yi (third round)
16. (Netherlands) Wong Yik Man (third round)

== Draw ==
=== Finals ===
Quarterfinals
(Indonesia) Maria Febe Kusumastuti | 21 | 20 | 14
12 | (Singapore) Gu Juan | 15 | 22 | 21
3 | (China) Wang Lin | 21 | 21
(Japan) Ayane Kurihara | 10 | 10
(China) Wang Shixian | 16 | 13
10 | (South Korea) Bae Youn-Joo | 21 | 21
8 | (Indonesia) Pia Zebadiah Bernadet | 21 | 8 | 15
2 | (China) Liu Xin | 16 | 21 | 21

Semifinals
12 | (Singapore) Gu Juan | 14 | 14
3 | (China) Wang Lin | 21 | 21
10 | (South Korea) Bae Youn-Joo | 21 | 16 | 21
2 | (China) Liu Xin | 13 | 21 | 16

Final
3 | (China) Wang Lin | 21 | 21
10 | (South Korea) Bae Youn-Joo | 16 | 15

=== Top half ===
==== Section 1 ====
First round
(Turkey) O Caliskan | 17 | 12
(Russia) K Polikarpova | 21 | 21
(India) P Thulasi | 12 | 11
(South Korea) Eom H-W | 21 | 21

Second round
1 | (Singapore) Xing AY | 21 | 14 | 18
(South Korea) Choi H-I | 13 | 21 | 21
(Indonesia) M Kusumastuti | 18 | 21 | 21
(Russia) K Polikarpova | 21 | 11 | 16
14 | (Singapore) Zhang BW | 21 | 21
(Thailand) S Taerattanachai | 17 | 15
(Australia) L Choo | 10 | 11
(South Korea) Eom H-W | 21 | 21

Third round
(South Korea) Choi H-I | 14 | 19
(Indonesia) M Kusumastuti | 21 | 21
14 | (Singapore) Zhang BW | 13 | 21 | 17
(South Korea) Eom H-W | 21 | 14 | 21

Fourth round
(Indonesia) M Kusumastuti | 16 | 21 | 21
(South Korea) Eom H-W | 21 | 11 | 16

==== Section 2 ====
First round
(Vietnam) Nguyen TNT | 21 | 10 | 21
(Germany) L Deichgraeber | 19 | 21 | 14
(New Zealand) A Rankin | 6 | 8
(Hong Kong) Tung YH | 21 | 21
(Thailand) P Wangpaiboonkj | 21 | 21
(Philippines) M Yupangco | 8 | 3

Second round
7 | (Scotland) L Sloan
(Kyrgyzstan) D Zvereva | WO
(Bulgaria) P Neykova | 19 | 17
(Vietnam) Nguyen TNT | 21 | 21
12 | (Singapore) Gu J | 28 | 21
(South Korea) Sung J-H | 26 | 18
(Hong Kong) Tung YH | 21 | 16 | 8
(Thailand) P Wangpaiboonkj | 12 | 21 | 21

Third round
7 | (Scotland) L Sloan | 21 | 21
(Vietnam) Nguyen TNT | 11 | 19
12 | (Singapore) Gu J | 21 | 21
(Thailand) P Wangpaiboonkj | 4 | 6

Fourth round
7 | (Scotland) L Sloan | 21 | 8 | 15
12 | (Singapore) Gu J | 11 | 21 | 21

==== Section 3 ====
First round
(Mongolia) D Soronzonbold | WO
(England) P Riou
(Japan) S Uchida | 21 | 21
(New Zealand) M Leviana | 13 | 10
(Indonesia) F Angguni
(Bulgaria) S Gudjenova | WO

Second round
3 | (China) Wang L | 21 | 21
(Czech Republic) S Krizkova | 9 | 11
(Philippines) K Velez | 19 | 15
(England) P Riou | 21 | 21
11 | (Malaysia) L Cheah | 21 | 21
(United States) C Chow | 10 | 11
(Japan) S Uchida | 18 | 21 | 21
(Indonesia) F Angguni | 21 | 11 | 12

Third round
3 | (China) Wang L | 21 | 21
(England) P Riou | 12 | 12
11 | (Malaysia) L Cheah | 21 | 21
(Japan) S Uchida | 11 | 16

Fourth round
3 | (China) Wang L | 21 | 21
11 | (Malaysia) L Cheah | 9 | 19

==== Section 4 ====
First round
(India) A Pantawane | 21 | 21
(Bulgaria) B Maneva | 10 | 16
(United States) I Zhong | 4 | 7
(Chinese Taipei) I C-L | 21 | 21
(South Africa) D Godfrey | 6 | 3
(Chinese Taipei) Chiang P-H | 21 | 21

Second round
5 | (Netherlands) P Stolzenbach | 16 | 18
(Japan) A Kurihara | 21 | 21
(Puerto Rico) K Gonzalez | 4 | 6
(India) A Pantawane | 21 | 21
9 | (Germany) F Deprez | 15 | 21 | 17
(Hong Kong) Poon LY | 21 | 19 | 21
(Chinese Taipei) I C-L | 21 | 21
(Chinese Taipei) Chiang P-H | 8 | 17

Third round
(Japan) A Kurihara | 21 | 21
(India) A Pantawane | 15 | 12
(Hong Kong) Poon LY | 19 | 12
(Chinese Taipei) I C-L | 21 | 21

Fourth round
(Japan) A Kurihara | 21 | 21
(Chinese Taipei) I C-L | 14 | 14

=== Bottom half ===
==== Section 5 ====
First round
(Mexico) D Angulo | 8 | 10
(Japan) Y Miki | 21 | 21
(Germany) C Nelte | 11 | 14
(Hong Kong) Chan TK | 21 | 21
(Vietnam) Nguyen THA | 7 | 11
(Japan) M Nojirino | 21 | 21

Second round
(Japan) Y Miki | 21 | 21
(Hong Kong) Chan TK | 10 | 18
(Czech Republic) E Maixnerova | 16 | 15
15 | (Malaysia) Tee JY | 21 | 21
(Japan) M Nojirino | 10 | 11
(China) Wang SX | 21 | 21
(England) S Walker | 12 | 14
6 | (Singapore) Fu MT | 21 | 21

Third round
(Japan) Y Miki | 21 | 21
15 | (Malaysia) Tee JY | 17 | 19
(China) Wang SX | 21 | 21
6 | (Singapore) Fu MT | 13 | 11

Fourth round
(Japan) Y Miki | 10 | 10
(China) Wang SX | 21 | 21

==== Section 6 ====
First round
(Philippines) J Paredes | 7 | 8
(Indonesia) L Fanetri | 21 | 21
(New Zealand) J Jonggowisastro | 17 | 21 | 22
(Thailand) R Chuthabunditkul | 21 | 14 | 20
(Turkey) E Epice
(South Africa) C Mann | WO

Second round
(Indonesia) L Fanetri | 21 | 21
(New Zealand) J Jonggowisastro | 13 | 9
(Philippines) C Lizardo | 3 | 2
10 | (South Korea) Bae Y-J | 21 | 21
(Turkey) E Epice | 12 | 14
(Chinese Taipei) Hung S-H | 21 | 21
(Puerto Rico) D Santana | 8 | 11
4 | (Denmark) A Jensen | 21 | 21

Third round
(Indonesia) L Fanetri | 10 | 10
10 | (South Korea) Bae Y-J | 21 | 21
(Chinese Taipei) Hung S-H | 21 | 21
4 | (Denmark) A Jensen | 19 | 19

Fourth round
10 | (South Korea) Bae Y-J | 19 | 21 | 21
(Chinese Taipei) Hung S-H | 21 | 10 | 11

==== Section 7 ====
First round
(Australia) V Na | 20 | 19
(Scotland) G Sloan | 22 | 21
(South Africa) J Fry | 9 | 6
(India) S Reddy | 21 | 21
(United States) B Neumann | 21 | 21
(Puerto Rico) I Gonzalez | 17 | 18

Second round
(Scotland) G Sloan | 16 | 9
(India) S Reddy | 21 | 21
(Russia) V Ushkova | 9 | 8
13 | (Thailand) P Buranaprasertsuk | 21 | 21
(United States) B Neumann
(Kyrgyzstan) I Kuligina | WO
(Mongolia) U Turtogtokh | WO
8 | (Indonesia) PZ Bernadet

Third round
(India) S Reddy | 21 | 17 | 7
13 | (Thailand) P Buranaprasertsuk | 11 | 21 | 21
(United States) B Neumann | 4 | 10
8 | (Indonesia) PZ Bernadet | 21 | 21

Fourth round
13 | (Thailand) P Buranaprasertsuk | 11 | 21 | 18
8 | (Indonesia) PZ Bernadet | 21 | 17 | 21

==== Section 8 ====
First round
(Sweden) J Carlsson | 17 | 13
(Bulgaria) D Popstoykova | 21 | 21
(China) Li XR
(Kyrgyzstan) A Kasymova | WO
(India) R Misha | 12 | 21 | 21
(New Zealand) C Chapple | 21 | 12 | 16

Second round
(Bulgaria) D Popstoykova | 7 | 4
(China) Li XR | 21 | 21
(Hong Kong) Tse YS | 25 | 17 | 19
16 | (Netherlands) Wong YM | 23 | 21 | 21
(India) R Misha | 10 | 21 | 10
(Russia) D Dvoretskaja | 21 | 17 | 21
(Netherlands) S Piek | 9 | 9
2 | (China) Liu X | 21 | 21

Third round
(China) Li XR | 21 | 21
16 | (Netherlands) Wong YM | 7 | 9
(Russia) D Dvoretskaja | 8 | 10
2 | (China) Liu X | 21 | 21

Fourth round
(China) Li XR | 14 | 15
2 | (China) Liu X | 21 | 21
