= Kim Moon-hi =

South Korean badminton player (born 1988)

Personal information
- Born: 28 June 1988 (age 38) Gimje, South Korea
- Height: 1.85 m (6 ft 1 in)
- Weight: 65 kg (143 lb)

Sport
- Country: South Korea
- Sport: Badminton
- Handedness: Right
- Event: Women's singles
Medal record
Women's badminton
Representing South Korea
Sudirman Cup
Silver medal – second place	2009 Guangzhou	Mixed team
Bronze medal – third place	2011 Qingdao	Mixed team
World Junior Championships
Gold medal – first place	2006 Incheon	Mixed team
Bronze medal – third place	2006 Incheon	Girls' singles
Asian Junior Championships
Gold medal – first place	2006 Kuala Lumpur	Mixed team
Bronze medal – third place	2005 Jakarta	Girls' team

Kim Moon-hi (Korean: 김문희; born 28 June 1988) is a South Korean badminton player. Kim who educated at the SacredHeart Girl's High School in Jeonju was part of the Korean junior team that won the bronze medal at the 2005 Asian Junior Championships and made it to the gold medal in 2006. She also won the girls' singles bronze medal at the 2006 World Junior Championships, and helped the team clinch the gold medal. For her achievements in the junior tournaments, she received the Korea Sports Council's Scholarship. Kim later educated at the Korea National Sport University. Played for the Daekyo Noonnoppi team, Kim was awarded as Most Valuable Players at the Korean Spring League tournament. She is now pursuing a master's degree in sport psychology at the Kyonggi University.

== Achievements ==
=== World Junior Championships ===
Girls' singles
Year	Venue	Opponent	Score	Result
2006	Samsan World Gymnasium; Incheon, South Korea	(China) Wang Yihan	16–21, 13–21	Bronze

=== BWF International Challenge/Series ===
Women's singles
Year	Tournament	Opponent	Score	Result
2009	Osaka International	(Japan) Ai Goto	14–21, 14–21	(silver) Runner-up
2006	Mongolia Satellite	(South Korea) Jang Soo-young		(silver) Runner-up

BWF International Challenge tournament
BWF International Series tournament
