= Elizabeth Cann =

English badminton player (born 1979)

Personal information
- Nickname: Liz
- Born: Elizabeth Alice Cann; 21 March 1979 (age 47) Redhill, Surrey, England
- Height: 1.67 m (5 ft 6 in)
- Weight: 60 kg (132 lb)

Sport
- Country: England
- Sport: Badminton
- Handedness: Right

Women's singles
- Highest ranking: 19 (2 June 2005)
- BWF profile
Medal record
Women's badminton
Representing England
Sudirman Cup
Bronze medal – third place	2007 Glasgow	Mixed team
European Mixed Team Championships
Silver medal – second place	2008 Herning	Mixed team
Silver medal – second place	2009 Liverpool	Mixed team
European Women's Team Championships
Silver medal – second place	2006 Thessalonica	Women's team
Commonwealth Games
Bronze medal – third place	2010 Delhi	Women's singles
Bronze medal – third place	2010 Delhi	Mixed team

Elizabeth Alice "Liz" Cann (born 21 March 1979) is a badminton player from England. Cann started playing badminton along with many other sports at about age six, and was coached by her mother, Carmen. When she was 19, Cann moved to Denmark for three years to develop her badminton further, and started receiving formal technical coaching.

== Achievements ==
=== Commonwealth Games ===
Women's singles

Year	Venue	Opponent	Score	Result
2010	Siri Fort Sports Complex; New Delhi, India	(Scotland) Susan Egelstaff	21–18, 21–16	Bronze

=== BWF International Challenge/Series ===
Year	Tournament	Opponent	Score	Result
2008	Scottish Open	(Estonia) Kati Tolmoff	16–21, 21–10, 21–12	(gold) Winner
2008	Finnish Open	(Sweden) Sara Persson	21–12, 21–17	(gold) Winner
2007	Irish Open	(Japan) Kaori Mori	21–19, 21–9	(gold) Winner
