= Lim Fang Yang =

Malaysian badminton player

Lim Fang Yang 林方阳
Personal information
- Born: 14 February 1989 (age 37)

Sport
- Country: Malaysia
- Sport: Badminton

Men's singles
- Highest ranking: 120 (8 November 2012)
- BWF profile
Medal record
Men's badminton
Representing Malaysia
World Junior Championships
| Bronze medal – third place | 2006 Incheon | Mixed team |
Asian Junior Championships
| Gold medal – first place | 2007 Kuala Lumpur | Mixed team |
| Silver medal – second place | 2006 Kuala Lumpur | Mixed team |
| Bronze medal – third place | 2007 Kuala Lumpur | Boys' singles |

Lim Fang Yang (born 14 February 1989) is a Malaysian badminton player. Lim started playing badminton at age 4, and he entered the Pahang State team when he was 10. In 2007, he reached the semi-final round of the Asian Junior Championships where he lost to Chen Long and settled for the bronze medal. In 2012, he won the Miami International tournament in the men's singles event.

Upon leaving the national team in 2012, he became the sparring partner for the other Malaysia national team players such as Lee Chong Wei until 2015. He was hand-picked by the Badminton Association of Malaysia (BAM) to coach the Junior National team and impart his valuable experience and skills till 2018.

Lim has been with BAM for over 16 years, train and competing alongside the top players of Malaysia. He has competed in both singles and doubles play throughout his career. Lim set up his own academy in Kuala Lumpur, coaching young players.

Coach Fang Yang was invited to Singapore in early 2018 to coach the training of more advanced players. He helped out for more than a year before setting up his own academy in Singapore.

== Achievements ==
=== Asian Junior Championships ===
Boys' singles

| Year | Venue | Opponent | Score | Result |
|---|---|---|---|---|
| 2007 | Stadium Juara, Kuala Lumpur, Malaysia | (China) Chen Long | 2–21, 11–21 | Bronze |

=== BWF International Challenge/Series ===
Men's singles

| Year | Tournament | Opponent | Score | Result |
|---|---|---|---|---|
| 2012 | Miami International | (United States) Sattawat Pongnairat | 21–19, 21–18 | (gold) Winner |

BWF International Challenge tournament
BWF International Series tournament
