= Saina Nehwal =

Indian badminton player (born 1990)

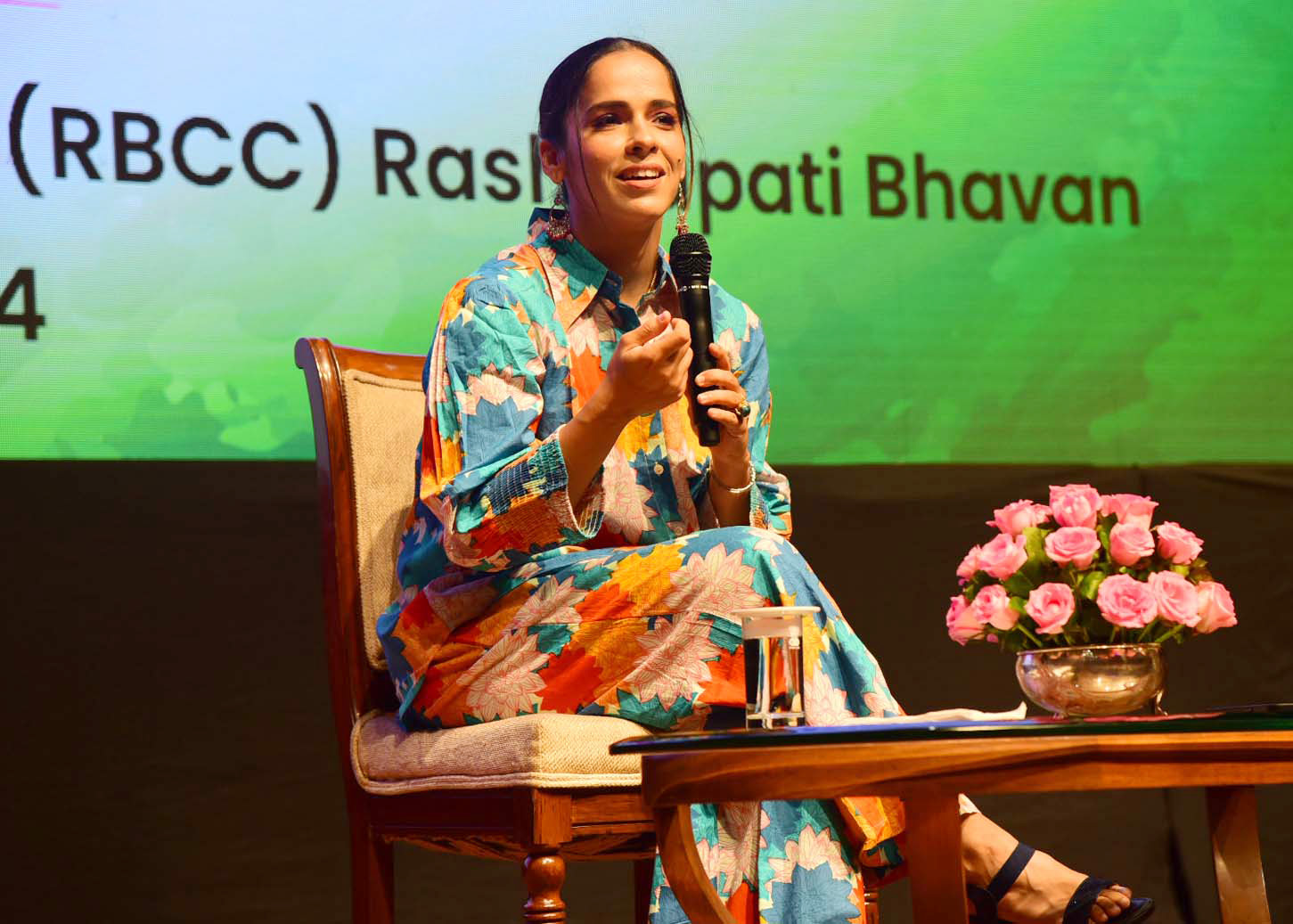
- Nehwal in 2024

Personal information
- Born: 17 March 1990 (age 36) Hisar, Haryana, India
- Years active: 2005–2023
- Height: 1.65 m (5 ft 5 in)
- Weight: 65 kg (143 lb)
- Spouse: Parupalli Kashyap (m. 2018)

Sport
- Country: India
- Sport: Badminton
- Handedness: Right
- Retired: 19 January 2026

Women's singles
- Career record: 446 wins, 234 losses
- Highest ranking: 1 (2 April 2015)
- Honours: Khel Ratna Award; Arjuna Award; Padma Bhushan; Padma Shri
- BWF profile
Medal record
Women's badminton
Representing India
Olympic Games
Bronze medal – third place	2012 London	Women's singles
World Championships
Silver medal – second place	2015 Jakarta	Women's singles
Bronze medal – third place	2017 Glasgow	Women's singles
Uber Cup
Bronze medal – third place	2014 New Delhi	Women's team
Bronze medal – third place	2016 Kunshan	Women's team
Commonwealth Games
Gold medal – first place	2010 New Delhi	Women's singles
Gold medal – first place	2018 Gold Coast	Women's singles
Gold medal – first place	2018 Gold Coast	Mixed team
Silver medal – second place	2010 New Delhi	Mixed team
Bronze medal – third place	2006 Melbourne	Mixed team
Asian Games
Bronze medal – third place	2014 Incheon	Women's team
Bronze medal – third place	2018 Jakarta and Palembang	Women's singles
Asian Championships
Bronze medal – third place	2010 New Delhi	Women's singles
Bronze medal – third place	2016 Wuhan	Women's singles
Bronze medal – third place	2018 Wuhan	Women's singles
World Junior Championships
Gold medal – first place	2008 Pune	Girls' singles
Silver medal – second place	2006 Incheon	Girls' singles
Commonwealth Youth Games
Gold medal – first place	2008 Pune	Girls' singles
Silver medal – second place	2004 Bendigo	Mixed team

Saina Nehwal (born 17 March 1990) is a former Indian badminton player. A former world no. 1, she has won 24 international titles, which include ten Superseries titles. Although she reached the world's 2nd in 2009, it was only in 2015 that she was able to attain the world no. 1 ranking, thereby becoming the only female player from India and thereafter the second Indian player – after Prakash Padukone – to achieve this feat. She has represented India three times in the Olympics, winning a bronze medal in her second appearance at London 2012.

Nehwal has achieved several milestones in badminton for India. She is the only Indian to have won at least one medal in every BWF major individual event, namely the Olympics, the BWF World Championships, and the BWF World Junior Championships. She is the first Indian badminton player to have won an Olympic medal, the first Indian to have reached the final of the BWF World Championships, and the first Indian to have won the BWF World Junior Championships. In 2006, Nehwal became the first Indian female and the youngest Asian to win a 4-star tournament. She is also the first Indian to win a Super Series title. In the 2014 Uber Cup, she captained the Indian team and remained undefeated, helping India to win a first-ever Uber Cup bronze medal. Nehwal also became the first Indian to win two singles gold medals (2010 and 2018) at the Commonwealth Games.

Considered one of India's most successful badminton players, Nehwal is credited for increasing the popularity of badminton in India. In 2016, she was conferred the Padma Bhushan – India's third highest civilian award. Previously, she had also received the nation's top two sporting honours, namely the Major Dhyan Chand Khel Ratna and the Arjuna Award. Nehwal is a philanthropist and was ranked 18th on the list of most charitable athletes in 2015.

The London 2012 Olympic bronze medallist last played a competitive match at the 2023 Singapore Open, but confirmed her retirement from professional badminton in January 2026 on a podcast.

== Early life ==
Saina Nehwal, the daughter of Harvir Singh Nehwal and Usha Rani Nehwal, was born in Hisar, Haryana. She has an elder sister named Chandranshu Nehwal. Her father, who has a PhD in agricultural science, worked at Chaudhary Charan Singh Haryana Agricultural University. She completed her first few years of schooling at Campus School CCS HAU, Hisar. She finished 12th grade from the St. Ann's College for Women, Hyderabad.

When her father was promoted and transferred from Haryana to Hyderabad, she took up badminton at the age of eight to express herself, as she did not know the local language well enough to socialise with other kids. Her parents played badminton for a number of years. Her mother, Usha Rani, was a state level badminton player in Haryana. Nehwal took up badminton to fulfill her mother's dream of becoming a national level badminton player, while her sister played volleyball. Her father, who was among the top players in the university circuit, used his provident fund to invest in good badminton training for her. After moving to Hyderabad in 1998, she was enrolled in a karate class by her parents, which she continued for a year and earned a brown belt.

She trained under Pullela Gopichand in his academy Gopichand Badminton Academy. In 2014, she parted with Gopichand and joined Prakash Padukone Badminton Academy in Bangalore and trained under U. Vimal Kumar under whose training she became World number one; she later in 2017 returned to train under Gopichand. In his book 'Dreams of a Billion: India and the Olympic Games', Gopichand said that he felt miserable when she left him and went to train in Bangalore.

== Personal life ==
Nehwal and her family speak the Haryanvi language at home. She is a fan of actors Shah Rukh Khan and Mahesh Babu and cricketer Chris Gayle. She is in the process of opening a badminton academy in her native state of Haryana.

She married a badminton player, Parupalli Kashyap in a private ceremony on 14 December 2018. On 14 July 2025, Nehwal announced separation from her husband in an Instagram post. However, on 2 August 2025, she shared on Instagram that the couple was "trying again" and working on their relationship.

== Political career ==
Nehwal joined the Bharatiya Janata Party in Delhi on 29 January 2020 in the presence of party's national general secretary Arun Singh. Her sister Abu Chandranshu Nehwal also joined the party. She was quoted as saying "Narendra Modi is working hard for the country, and has always inspired me."

== Career ==
=== 2005–2007 ===
In 2005, at the age of 15, Nehwal has won an Asian Satellite tournament in New Delhi, beating Aparna Popat in the final in straight games.

In 2006, Nehwal became the under-19 national champion and claimed her second Indian Asian Satellite tournament. In May, at age 16, she became the first Indian woman and the youngest player from Asia to win a 4-star tournament – the Philippines Open. Entering the tournament as the 86th seed, she went on to stun several top-seeded players including the then world number two Huaiwen Xu before defeating Julia Wong Pei Xian of Malaysia for the title. A few months after she entered the International badminton circuit, Nehwal participated at the World Championships where she lost to Jiang Yanjiao of China. The same year Nehwal reached the final of 2006 BWF World Junior Championships where she lost a hard-fought match against top seed Chinese Wang Yihan. She also competed at the Doha Asian Games.

In 2007, at a very young age of 17, Nehwal went on to take part in the All England, where she challenged experienced Wang Chen in round 2, but went down in 3 games 21–17, 13–21, 16–21. She represented India at the Sudirman Cup in Scotland. At the 2007 BWF World Championships, she won her opening matches against Jeanine Cicognini of Switzerland and 13th seed Juliane Schenk of Germany, but lost the next round to French Pi Hongyan with score 13–21, 17–21. She was a finalist at the Indian International challenge in 2007 where she lost to Kanako Yonekura in 2 games.

=== 2008 ===
Two years after losing the final to Wang Yihan, she became the first Indian to win World Junior Championships by defeating ninth seeded Japanese Sayaka Sato 21–9, 21–18. She participated in the 2008 Beijing Olympics where she was unseeded. She began her fight with a win against Russian Ella Diehl (2–0) in round 1 and Ukrainian Larisa Griga (2–0) in second round. She became the first Indian woman to reach the quarter-finals when she upset reigning Asian Games champion number four seed Wang Chen of Hong Kong in a three-game thriller. In the quarter-finals Nehwal lost a 3-gamer to world number 16 Maria Kristin Yulianti. Nehwal was leading 11–3 in the decider but could not hold on against her opponent and lost the match by a 28–26, 14–21, 15–21 scoreline.

In September 2008, she won the Chinese Taipei Open 2008 beating Lyddia Cheah of Malaysia 21–8, 21–19. She was also a semifinalist at the China Masters Superseries after she beat reigning World Champion Zhu Lin in quarterfinals. Nehwal won the Commonwealth Youth Games by beating her compatriot N. Sikki Reddy in two games. Nehwal was named "The Most Promising Player" by the Badminton World Federation in 2008. She qualified for the season ending Superseries Finals which consists of most consistent players of the year. She defeated Pi Hongyan and Wong Mew Choo in early rounds. She lost to Tine Rasmussen in round 3. She entered semifinals but lost to Wang Chen with scores 21–15, 14–21, 16–21.

=== 2009 ===
In June, she became the first Indian to win a BWF Super Series title, the most prominent badminton series of the world by winning the Indonesia Open. She beat Chinese Wang Lin in the final 12–21, 21–18, 21–9. Nehwal on winning the tournament said, "I had been longing to win a super series tournament since my quarter final appearance at the Olympics". She is at par with the likes of Prakash Padukone and her mentor Pullela Gopichand who both won the all England championships which are of similar status to the super series.

In August, she reached to the quarterfinals of the World Championships, losing to the second seed Wang Lin. She qualified for the season ending Superseries Finals in December, where she lost the opening match to Wong Mew Choo (eventual champion) but won the next two group matches against Porntip Buranaprasertsuk and Canada's Charmaine Reid. She again reached the semifinals of this tournament but went down, this time to Germany's Juliane Schenk. She won India Grand Prix tournament later in the year, defeating compatriot Aditi Mutatkar in the final with scores 21–17, 21–13.

=== 2010 ===
Nehwal became the first Indian woman to reach the semi-finals of All England Open before losing to eventual champion Tine Rasmussen. Top seeded Nehwal reached the semifinals of Asian Championships, losing out to unseeded eventual champion Li Xuerui of China, settling for bronze medal. Her coach Pullela Gopichand advised her not put too much pressure on herself due to the overwhelming home crowd support.

Nehwal won the India Open Grand Prix Gold, beating Wong Mew Choo of Malaysia in the final and thus justifying her billing as top seed in the tournament. Nehwal, again seeded number 1, won the Singapore Open, by beating qualifier Tai Tzu-ying of Chinese Taipei in the final with the score of 21–18, 21–15 having defeated World Champion Lu Lan earlier in the semifinal. Nehwal reached a career high of world no. 3 in the women's singles badminton world rankings on 24 June 2010.

She defended her Indonesia Open title in three tough games against Sayaka Sato, 21–19, 13–21, 21–11. This was her third Super Series title and her third successive title following wins at Indian and Singapore Open Super Series. On 15 July 2010, with 64791.26 points, Nehwal reached a career high world ranking of number 2 only behind Wang Yihan of China. Second seed Nehwal, a tournament favourite, crashed out of the 2010 BWF World Championships in Paris after losing to 4th ranked Chinese Wang Shixian in straight sets 8–21, 14–21.

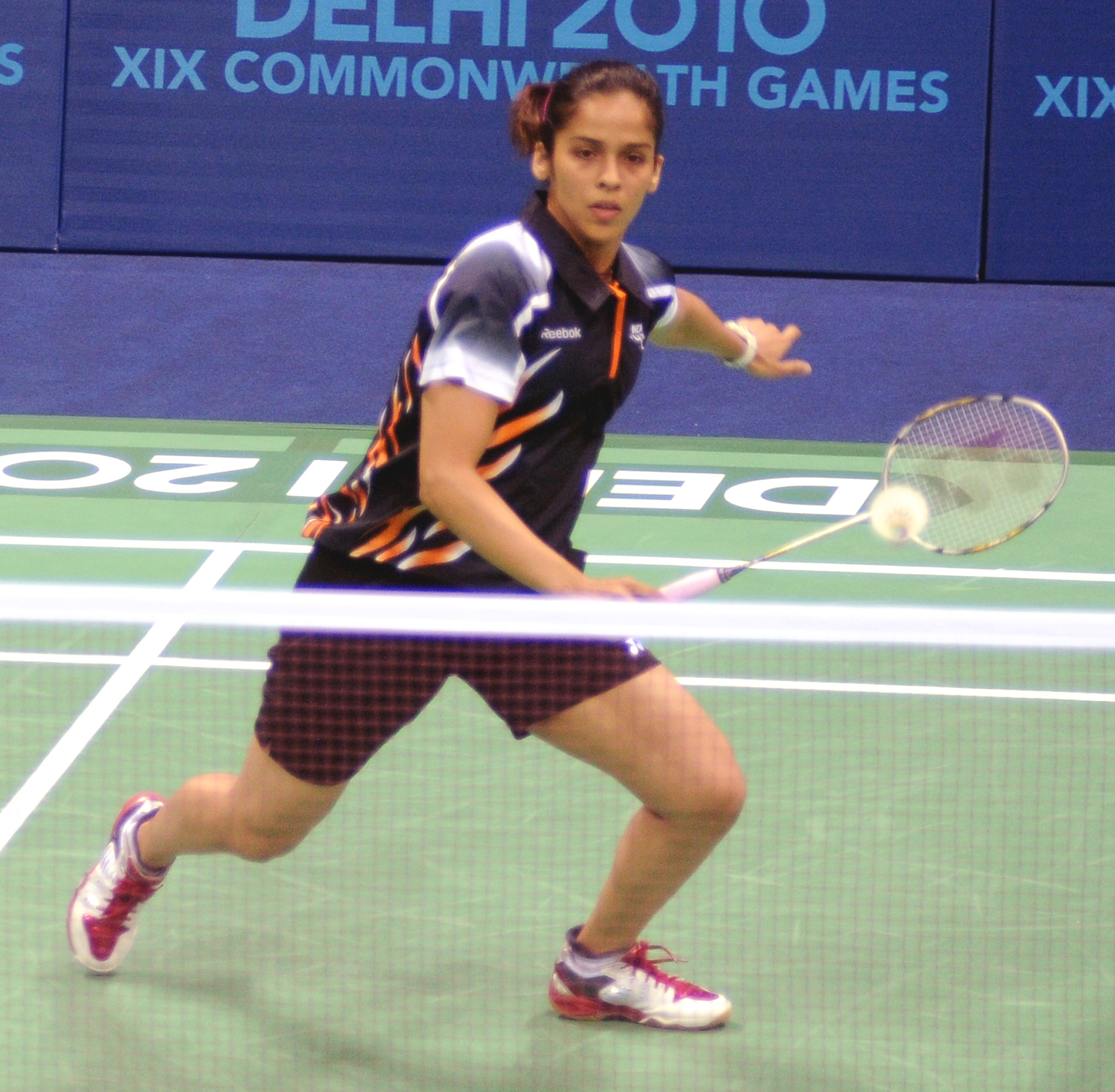
Saina Nehwal in action in 2010 Commonwealth Games, Delhi

On 27 September 2010, Nehwal dropped to number 7 ranking after giving a miss to China Masters and Japan Open due to her preparation for the 2010 Commonwealth Games.

Top seed Nehwal won the gold medal in the women's singles in the Commonwealth Games held in New Delhi. after beating Wong Mew Choo of Malaysia 19–21, 23–21, 21–13. After her win Nehwal said, "when I was a match-point down, it was like a shock. It was a big match and winning it means a lot to me. Even many years from now, those present here will always remember how Saina won the gold. It is a proud feeling". Nehwal confirmed her participation for the Hong Kong Open after a gap of more than five months since her win in the Indonesia Open in June 2010. On 12 December 2010, she defeated Wang Shixian 15–21, 21–16, 21–17 in the final of the Hong Kong Open to win her fourth career Super Series title.

=== 2011 ===
2nd seeded Nehwal beat Sung Ji-hyun of South Korea 21–13, 21–14 to win the Swiss Open title. Nehwal faltered after a good start as she lost to the then world number three Wang Xin of China in the finals to finish runner-up in the Malaysia Grand Prix Gold tournament. She was a part of Indian team in the Sudirman Cup mixed team who managed to reach the quarterfinals of this elite mixed team event for the first time ever, as India managed to beat Thailand 3–2, even when Nehwal lost her tie against Ratchanok Intanon. In the quarterfinals against China, Nehwal put up her best performance and beat the then world number two Wang Xin with 21–15, 21–11, but still the Chinese managed to move into the semi-finals with a 3–1 win over India.

In attempt to record a third straight win at the Indonesian Open, she reached the finals once more where she lost to Wang Yihan of China to finish as runner-up, on 26 June. Nehwal crashed out of the World Championship as she lost 15–21, 10–21 to Wang Xin. Nehwal, who reached the quarterfinals in the last two editions of the event, had to be content with yet another last-eight finish. During the season ending tournament 2011 BWF Super Series Masters Finals in Liuzhou in December, Nehwal won her all group matches against Bae Yeon-ju, Sayaka Sato and Wang Xin and once again reached the semifinals. She created history by becoming the first Indian singles player to reach the final after defeating World number 5 Tine Baun of Denmark scoring 21–17, 21–18 win. She lost the final 21–18, 13–21, 13–21 against the World No. 1 Wang Yihan in a contest lasting over an hour.

=== 2012 ===
Nehwal successfully defended her Swiss Open title by defeating Wang Shixian 21–19, 21–16 on 18 March, a day after she turned 22 years old. On 10 June, she defeated Thailand's Ratchanok Intanon 19–21, 21–15, 21–10, to lift the Thailand Open title. On 17 June, Nehwal won the third consecutive Indonesia Open by defeating Li Xuerui, a player who was on 30 match winning streak with most dominant performance in the season so far with scores 13–21, 22–20, 21–19.

At the London Olympics, Nehwal was seeded 4th in the draw. In the group stage she defeated Swiss Sabrina Jaquet (2–0) and Belgian Lianne Tan both in straight games. She reached the knockout phase where she defeated Dutch Yao Jie with scores 21–14, 21–16. She then faced Tine Baun, the number 5 seed whom she defeated with 21–15, 22–20 scoreline. She afterwards advanced to semifinals where she lost to top seed Wang Yihan in two straight games 13–21, 13–21. On 4 August, she won the bronze medal when Wang Xin retired from the bronze medal playoff with an injury after taking the first game.

On 21 October, she won the Denmark Open after defeating Germany's Juliane Schenk. Nehwal successfully entered the finals of French Open, but she lost against Minatsu Mitani in straight sets. She participated at the season ending Superseries Finals. In the group stage, she lost to Tine Baun (1–2), won against Juliane Schenk (2–0) & lost the 3rd match to Ratchanok Intanon (0–2). She reached the semifinals but lost a well contested match to Li Xuerui in 3 games, 20–22, 21–7, 13–21.

=== 2013–2014 ===
In 2013, Nehwal reached the semifinal of All England Open also but was defeated by 3-time World Junior Champion Ratchanok Intanon. She has yet another quarterfinal finish at the World Championships, after going down to Korean Bae Yeon-ju with score 21–23, 9–21. She qualified for the season ending Superseries Finals held at Kuala Lumpur where she lost to Minatsu Mitani and Li Xuerui, but won the last group match against Bae Yeon-ju in 3 games. However, she failed to progress to the semifinals.

On 26 January 2014, Nehwal defeated World Championship bronze medalist P.V. Sindhu 21–14, 21–17 to win the India Grand Prix Gold tournament. In the final of Australian Open on 29 June, Nehwal defeated Spain's Carolina Marín 21–18, 21–11 to win the title. She withdrew from 2014 Commonwealth Games due to fitness Issue and injury problems she carried during Australian Open. She lost in the quarterfinals of World Championships again, this time to Li Xuerui. She was the quarter-finalist at the Asian Games as well, where she lost to Wang Yihan. She became the first Indian player to win the China Open by beating Japan's Akane Yamaguchi 21–12, 22–20 in the final. She contested at the Superseries Finals and won all of her group matches against top seed Wang Shixian (2–0), Bae Yeon-ju (2–1) & Sung Ji-hyun (2–0). She reached the semifinals once more, but lost to eventual champion Tai Tzu-ying 21–11, 13–21, 9–21.

=== 2015 ===
Defending champion Nehwal won the Syed Modi International by defeating Carolina Marín in the final. She became the first Indian woman shuttler to reach the finals of the All England Open, but lost to Marín in the final. On 29 March, Nehwal won her maiden women's singles title at the India Open, by beating Ratchanok Intanon. This assured her of becoming World number 1 when the latest BWF rankings were released on 2 April. With this, she became the first Indian player to achieve this feat in Women's category.

At the World Championship held in Jakarta, Nehwal was seeded 2nd. She defeated Cheung Ngan Yi and Sayaka Takahashi in early rounds and reached the quarterfinals where she faced Chinese Wang Yihan. She was able to beat her in 3 games 21–15, 19–21, 21–19; thus assured herself of first ever medal at the World Championships. She beat home hope Lindaweni Fanetri in the semifinal and created history by becoming first ever player from India to contest World badminton championship finals. She settled for the silver after going down to Carolina Marín in final.

Defending champion Nehwal fought hard before going down to Li Xuerui in the final of the China Open. She took part at the Season Ending Championships where she lost against Tai Tzu-ying and Nozomi Okuhara but won against Carolina Marín, a player she struggled to beat in the whole year, in one of the group matches. However she failed to reach the knockout phase.

=== 2016 ===
Nehwal dealt with injuries in early 2016 but she eventually recovered. She reached the semifinals of the Asian Championships after defeating the third seed Wang Shixian but settled for bronze medal, after losing to Wang Yihan 16–21, 14–21. At the Australian Open, Nehwal went into the finals after beating Ratchanok Intanon in quarters and Wang Yihan in semifinals. She defeated China's Sun Yu in the final by 11–21, 21–14, 21–19.

Making her third appearance at the Olympics, Nehwal, the fifth seed, won her opening match against the unseeded Lohaynny Vicente in straight games. However, she lost her second match against the world no. 61 from Ukraine Marija Ulitina by 18–21, 19–21, thereby making an exit at the group stage. Her coach cited the week-old knee injury for her below par performance. She was appointed as a member of IOC Athletes' Commission in October. She was also chosen as an Integrity Ambassador in BWF's Campaign – "I am Badminton" in December to promote clean and fair play in the sport.

=== 2017 ===
Nehwal went on to win Malaysia Masters by defeating Pornpawee Chochuwong with score 22–20, 22–20. She couldn't do well much of the year due to injury; she was still recovering. She was seeded 12th in the World Championship at Glasgow. She ousted Sabrina Jaquet in round 1. She beat 2nd seed Sung Ji-hyun in round of 16 and reached quarterfinals for 7th straight time. She had to dug deep into her reservoir to eke out a 21–19, 18–21, 21–15 win over world no. 31 Kirsty Gilmour of Scotland in the quarterfinal. However, she lost the semifinal to eventual winner Nozomi Okuhara of Japan, thus won the bronze medal. She then won the 82nd national badminton championship by beating P. V. Sindhu in the final.

=== 2018 ===
Nehwal reached the finals of the Indonesia Masters. En route to the finals she beat 3 seeded players Chen Yufei, P. V. Sindhu and Ratchanok Intanon. However she finished second-best after losing the final to Tai Tzu-ying. She won her second gold in Commonwealth Games women's singles after beating P. V. Sindhu in the final and led the Indian team to another gold medal in the mixed team event. She then clinched a bronze in the Asian Championships which was her third medal in the tournament altogether, as she went down fighting to the defending champion Tai Tzu-ying. At the World Championships, Nehwal was seeded 10th. She outgunned Turkish Aliye Demirbağ and advanced to next round. She further ousted 4th seed Ratchanok Intanon and reached World Championships quarter-final for record 8th straight time. She lost tamely to Carolina Marín there, in an unexpectedly lop-sided clash.

Nehwal was unseeded at the Jakarta-Palembang Asian Games. She defeated Iran's Sorayya Aghaei in round of 32 and Indonesia's Fitriani in second round both in straight games. She then won the quarterfinal, after making a stunning comeback against 4th seeded Ratchanok Intanon, when she was 3–12 down in Game 1 but eventually won it in 2 games thus made it to the semifinals. She made history by winning the first medal for India in badminton after a long wait of 36 years. She lost to Tai Tzu-ying in the semifinal, winning a bronze medal. She achieved a rare feat by winning medals from the quintet of badminton tournaments – the Olympics, the World Championships, the Commonwealth Games, the Asian Championships and the Asian Games.

At the Denmark Open, Nehwal was unseeded. She defeated Hongkonger Cheung Ngan Yi scoring 20–22, 21–17, 24–22 in her favour. She then defeated 2 tough Japanese opponents in successive rounds; beating Akane Yamaguchi and Nozomi Okuhara. After an easy win against Indonesia's Gregoria Mariska Tunjung in semifinal, she met her arch-rival and the no.1 seed Tai Tzu-ying. In the past 16 meetings Tai had won 11 and Nehwal wanted to break that jinx but couldn't managed and went down by 13–21, 21–13, 6–21. Nehwal went into the finals of Syed Modi Badminton Super 300 tournament but lost to Han Yue of China.

=== 2019 ===
She won her first BWF Super 500 title, the Indonesia Masters, against Carolina Marín, after the latter retired from the court injured. Defending her national championship title in Guwahati, Assam, Nehwal refused to play her singles match citing poor playing surface, and went on to win the National Championship by defeating top seed P. V. Sindhu 21–18, 21–15. This was her 4th National title. Her consistent record at the World Championships came to an end after she lost to Mia Blichfeldt in pre-quarterfinal in 3 hard fought games 21–15, 25–27, 12–21.

== Accolades ==
=== Awards ===
- Most Promising Player of the Year (2008) award by Badminton World Federation
- Arjuna Award (2009)
- Padma Shri (2010)
- Major Dhyan Chand Khel Ratna (2009–2010)
- Padma Bhushan (2016)

For the bronze medal at the 2012 London Olympics

- ₹10 million (US$110,000) cash award from the Haryana Government
- ₹5 million (US$53,000) cash award from the Rajasthan Government
- ₹5 million (US$53,000) cash award from the Andhra Pradesh Government
- ₹1 million (US$11,000) cash award from the Badminton Association of India
- Honorary doctorate degree by Mangalayatan University
- Honorary doctorate degree by SRM Institute of Science and Technology

=== Endorsements ===
In 2002, sports brand Yonex offered to sponsor Nehwal's kit. As her status and rankings improved, the number of sponsorships also increased. In 2004, Bharat Petroleum signed the rising star. She is one of the athletes supported by Olympic Gold Quest. She endorses Commune Builder, Edelweiss Group, Emami, Fortune Cooking Oil, Godrej No Marks, Herbalife Nutrition, Huawei Honor smartphone. Indian Overseas Bank, Iodex, NECC, Sahara Group, Star Sports, Top Ramen Noodles, Vaseline and Yonex.

Nehwal signed an endorsement deal worth Rs. 400 million with the sports management firm Rhiti Sports in 2012. However, she severed this deal in 2013 and signed up with KWAN entertainment and marketing solutions for an undisclosed sum. She has a dedicated sporting range with the multinational sports goods manufacturer Yonex, 4% of the profits of which goes to her.

=== In popular culture ===
Nehwal has been invited on popular Indian television shows as a guest including Satyamev Jayate, Comedy Nights with Kapil, The Kapil Sharma Show, Sam Jam.

Her autobiography, Playing to Win: My Life On and Off Court, was released in 2012.

Saina, a biopic based on her life, directed by Amol Gupte with actress Parineeti Chopra playing the title role, was released in 2021.

=== Legacy ===
Saina Nehwal Institute of Agricultural Technology, Training & Education at Chaudhary Charan Singh Haryana Agricultural University is named after her.

== Achievements ==
=== Olympic Games ===
Women's singles
Year	Venue	Opponent	Score	Result	Ref.
2012	Wembley Arena, London, Great Britain	(China) Wang Xin	18–21, 0–1 retired	Bronze	

=== BWF World Championships ===
Women's singles
Year	Venue	Opponent	Score	Result	Ref.
2015	Istora Gelora Bung Karno, Jakarta, Indonesia	(Spain) Carolina Marín	16–21, 19–21	Silver	
2017	Emirates Arena, Glasgow, Scotland	(Japan) Nozomi Okuhara	21–12, 17–21, 10–21	Bronze	

=== Commonwealth Games ===
Women's singles
Year	Venue	Opponent	Score	Result
2010	Siri Fort Sports Complex, New Delhi, India	(Malaysia) Wong Mew Choo	19–21, 23–21, 21–13	Gold
2018	Carrara Sports and Leisure Centre, Gold Coast, Australia	(India) P. V. Sindhu	21–18, 23–21	Gold

=== Asian Games ===
Women's singles
Year	Venue	Opponent	Score	Result	Ref.
2018	Istora Gelora Bung Karno, Jakarta, Indonesia	(Chinese Taipei) Tai Tzu-ying	17–21, 14–21	Bronze	

=== Asian Championships ===
Women's singles
Year	Venue	Opponent	Score	Result	Ref.
2010	Siri Fort Indoor Stadium, New Delhi, India	(China) Li Xuerui	17–21, 11–21	Bronze	
2016	Wuhan Sports Center Gymnasium, Wuhan, China	(China) Wang Yihan	16–21, 14–21	Bronze	
2018	Wuhan Sports Center Gymnasium, Wuhan, China	(Chinese Taipei) Tai Tzu-ying	25–27, 19–21	Bronze	

=== BWF World Junior Championships ===
Girls' singles
Year	Venue	Opponent	Score	Result	Ref.
2006	Samsan World Gymnasium, Incheon, South Korea	(China) Wang Yihan	13–21, 9–21	Silver	
2008	Shree Shiv Chhatrapati Badminton Hall, Pune, India	(Japan) Sayaka Sato	21–9, 21–18	Gold	

=== Commonwealth Youth Games ===
Girls' singles
Year	Venue	Opponent	Score	Result
2008	Shree Shiv Chhatrapati Sports Complex, Pune, India	(India) N. Sikki Reddy	23–21, 22–20	Gold

=== BWF World Tour (1 title, 3 runners-up) ===
The BWF World Tour, which was announced on 19 March 2017 and implemented in 2018, is a series of elite badminton tournaments sanctioned by the Badminton World Federation (BWF). The BWF World Tour is divided into levels of World Tour Finals, Super 1000, Super 750, Super 500, Super 300 (part of the HSBC World Tour), and the BWF Tour Super 100.

Women's singles
Year	Tournament	Level	Opponent	Score	Result	Ref.
2018	Indonesia Masters	Super 500	(Chinese Taipei) Tai Tzu-ying	9–21, 13–21	(silver) Runner-up	
2018	Denmark Open	Super 750	(Chinese Taipei) Tai Tzu-ying	13–21, 21–13, 6–21	(silver) Runner-up	
2018	Syed Modi International	Super 300	(China) Han Yue	18–21, 8–21	(silver) Runner-up	
2019	Indonesia Masters	Super 500	(Spain) Carolina Marín	4–10 retired	(gold) Winner	

=== BWF Superseries (10 titles, 5 runners-up) ===
The BWF Superseries, which was launched on 14 December 2006 and implemented in 2007, was a series of elite badminton tournaments, sanctioned by the Badminton World Federation (BWF). BWF Superseries levels were Superseries and Superseries Premier. A season of Superseries consisted of twelve tournaments around the world that had been introduced since 2011. Successful players were invited to the Superseries Finals, which were held at the end of each year.

Women's singles
Year	Tournament	Opponent	Score	Result	Ref.
2009	Indonesia Open	(China) Wang Lin	12–21, 21–18, 21–9	(gold) Winner	
2010	Singapore Open	(Chinese Taipei) Tai Tzu-ying	21–18, 21–15	(gold) Winner	
2010	Indonesia Open	(Japan) Sayaka Sato	21–19, 13–21, 21–11	(gold) Winner	
2010	Hong Kong Open	(China) Wang Shixian	15–21, 21–16, 21–17	(gold) Winner	
2011	Indonesia Open	(China) Wang Yihan	21–12, 21–23, 14–21	(silver) Runner-up	
2011	BWF Super Series Finals	(China) Wang Yihan	21–18, 13–21, 13–21	(silver) Runner-up	
2012	Indonesia Open	(China) Li Xuerui	13–21, 22–20, 21–19	(gold) Winner	
2012	Denmark Open	(Germany) Juliane Schenk	21–17, 21–8	(gold) Winner	
2012	French Open	(Japan) Minatsu Mitani	19–21, 11–21	(silver) Runner-up	
2014	Australian Open	(Spain) Carolina Marín	21–18, 21–11	(gold) Winner	
2014	China Open	(Japan) Akane Yamaguchi	21–12, 22–20	(gold) Winner	
2015	All England Open	(Spain) Carolina Marín	21–16, 14–21, 7–21	(silver) Runner-up	
2015	India Open	(Thailand) Ratchanok Intanon	21–16, 21–14	(gold) Winner	
2015	China Open	(China) Li Xuerui	12–21, 15–21	(silver) Runner-up	
2016	Australian Open	(China) Sun Yu	11–21, 21–14, 21–19	(gold) Winner	

BWF Super Series Finals tournament
BWF Super Series Premier tournament
BWF Super Series tournament

=== BWF Grand Prix (10 titles, 1 runner-up) ===
The BWF Grand Prix had two levels, the Grand Prix and Grand Prix Gold. It was a series of badminton tournaments sanctioned by the Badminton World Federation (BWF) and played between 2007 and 2017. The World Badminton Grand Prix was sanctioned by the International Badminton Federation from 1983 to 2006.

Women's singles
Year	Tournament	Opponent	Score	Result	Ref.
2006	Philippines Open	(Malaysia) Julia Wong Pei Xian	21–15, 22–20	(gold) Winner	
2008	Chinese Taipei Open	(Malaysia) Lydia Cheah	12–21, 21–18, 21–9	(gold) Winner	
2009	India Grand Prix	(India) Aditi Mutatkar	21–17, 21–13	(gold) Winner	
2010	India Open	(Malaysia) Wong Mew Choo	20–22, 21–14, 21–12	(gold) Winner	
2011	Malaysia Grand Prix Gold	(China) Wang Xin	21–13, 8–21, 14–21	(silver) Runner-up	
2011	Swiss Open	(South Korea) Sung Ji-hyun	21–13, 21–14	(gold) Winner	
2012	Swiss Open	(China) Wang Shixian	21–19, 21–16	(gold) Winner	
2012	Thailand Open	(Thailand) Ratchanok Intanon	19–21, 21–15, 21–10	(gold) Winner	
2014	India Grand Prix Gold	(India) P. V. Sindhu	21–14, 21–17	(gold) Winner	
2015	Syed Modi International	(Spain) Carolina Marín	19–21, 25–23, 21–16	(gold) Winner	
2017	Malaysia Masters	(Thailand) Pornpawee Chochuwong	22–20, 22–20	(gold) Winner	

BWF Grand Prix Gold tournament
BWF Grand Prix tournament

=== BWF International Challenge/Series/Satellite (2 titles, 1 runner-up) ===
Women's singles
Year	Tournament	Opponent	Score	Result	Ref.
2005	India Satellite	(India) Aparna Popat	11–8, 11–6	(gold) Winner	
2006	India Satellite	(South Korea) Jang Soo-young	21–9, 21–14	(gold) Winner	
2007	India International	(Japan) Kanako Yonekura	13–21, 18–21	(silver) Runner-up	

BWF International Challenge tournament
BWF Future Series tournament

=== National titles and runners-up ===
==== National Junior/Senior titles (13) ====
S. No.	Year	Tournament	Age group	Format	Partner	Opponent(s) in final	Score	Ref.
1	2002	Sub-Junior National Badminton Championship	Under 13	Singles	N/A	Parsa Naqvi	11–0, 11–4	
2	2002	Sub-Junior National Badminton Championship	Under 13	Doubles	Pizza Bharali	Mudra Dhainje / Fernaz Jasdanwala	11–5, 11–4	
3	2002	Sub-Junior National Badminton Championship	Under 16	Doubles	Aparna Balan	Manisha Eswarappa / Y. K. Subrata	11–2, 11–3	
4	2003	Sub-Junior National Badminton Championship	Under 16	Singles	N/A	Anjali Kalita	11–3, 11–13, 11–2	
5	2003	Sub-Junior National Badminton Championship	Under 16	Doubles	P. Jyotshna	G. M. Nischitha / Madhuri Vijay	15–6, 15–7	
6	2004	Junior National badminton championships	Under 19	Singles	N/A	Ridhi Pajwani	11–2, 11–4	
7	2004	Junior National badminton championships	Under 19	Doubles	Aparna Balan	T. Soumya / Ashwini Chowdary	15–6, 15–10	
8	2005	Junior National badminton championships	Under 19	Singles	N/A	Aditi Mutatkar	11–5, 13–10	
9	2005	Junior National badminton championships	Under 19	Doubles	Aparna Balan	V. Ruth Misha / Saumya Padhye	15–2,15–4	
10	2007	Senior National Badminton Championships	Senior	Singles	N/A	Aditi Mutatkar	21–19, 21–16	
11	2007	National Games	Senior	Singles	N/A	Aditi Mutatkar	24–22, 21–15	
12	2008	Senior National Badminton Championships	Senior	Singles	N/A	Trupti Murgunde	21–11, 21–10	
13	2017	Senior National Badminton Championships	Senior	Singles	N/A	P. V. Sindhu	21–17, 27–25	
14	2019	Senior National Badminton Championships	Senior	Singles	N/A	P. V. Sindhu	21–18, 21–15	

==== National Junior/Senior runners-up (1) ====
S. No.	Year	Tournament	Age group	Format	Partner	Opponent(s) in final	Score	Ref.
1	2006	Senior National Badminton Championships	Senior	Singles	N/A	Aparna Popat	11–13, 3–11	

== Performance timeline ==
Key

W	Won	F	Finalist	SF	Semi-finalist
QF	Quarter-finalist	#R	Rounds 4, 3, 2, 1	RR	Round-robin stage
Q#	Qualification round	A	Absent	w/d	Withdrew
G	Gold	S	Silver	B	Bronze
NH	Not held	N/A	Not applicable	DNQ	Did not qualify

Tournament	2004	2005	2006	2007	2008	2009	2010	2011	2012	2013	2014	2015	2016	2017	2018	2019	2020	2021	2022	2023	SR	Best	Ref
BWF events
World Junior Championships	2R	NH	S	A	G	N/A															1/3	G ('08)	
World Championships	NH	A	1R	3R	NH	QF	QF	QF	NH	QF	QF	S	NH	B	QF	3R	NH	A	3R		0/12	S ('15)	
Olympic Games	DNQ	NH			QF	NH			B	NH			RR	NH			DNQ	NH			0/3	B ('12)	
IBF Grand Prix				BWF Superseries / Grand Prix											BWF World Tour								
Malaysia Open	N/A			A		QF	QF	A	SF	SF	2R	SF	SF	1R	2R	1R	NH		1R	1R	0/12	SF ('12, '13, '15, '16)	
India Open	NH				2R	QF	W	1R	2R	2R	QF	W	SF	QF	QF	w/d	NH		2R	2R	2/13	W ('10, '15)	
Indonesia Masters	NH						A							NH	F	W	1R	A		2R	1/4	W ('19)	
Thailand Masters	NH												w/d	A			1R	NH		w/d	0/1	1R ('20)	
German Open	A			1R	A												NH		2R	A	0/2	2R ('22)	
All England Open	N/A			2R	1R	1R	SF	QF	QF	SF	QF	F	QF	QF	1R	QF	1R	1R	2R	A	0/16	F ('15)	
Swiss Open	N/A			1R	2R	QF	A	W	W	SF	QF	A	SF	w/d	A	w/d	NH	1R	2R	A	2/10	W ('11, '12)	
Spain Masters	NH														A		QF	A	NH	A	0/1	QF ('20)	
Orléans Masters	N/A														A		NH	SF	A	1R	0/2	SF ('21)	
Malaysia Masters	NH					QF	A	F	A					W	A	SF	QF	NH	1R	A	1/6	W ('17)	
Thailand Open	N/A			1R	QF	A	NH	QF	W	QF	NH	A		SF	w/d	2R	2R	NH	1R	2R	1/11	W ('12)	
Thailand Open	N/A			1R	QF	A	NH	QF	W	QF	NH	A		SF	w/d	2R	1R	NH	1R	2R	1/11	W ('12)	
Singapore Open	N/A			A	SF	QF	W	2R	A	QF	1R	A				QF	NH		QF	1R	1/9	W ('10)	
Indonesia Open	N/A			A	2R	W	W	F	W	SF	QF	QF	QF	2R	2R	w/d	NH	A			3/11	W ('09, '10, '12)	
Taipei Open	N/A			A	W	A										w/d	NH		w/d	A	1/1	W ('08)	
Korea Open	A					2R	A	2R	QF	QF	A				QF	1R	NH		A		0/6	QF ('12, '13, '18)	
Japan Open	N/A			A	1R	1R	A	SF	A			2R	A	2R	A	w/d	NH		1R	A	0/6	SF ('11)	
Vietnam Open	N/A		A														NH		w/d	A	0/0		
Denmark Open	N/A			1R	A	QF	A	2R	W	QF	QF	2R	A	QF	F	1R	A	1R	1R	A	1/11	W ('12)	
French Open	N/A			A		QF	A	2R	F	2R	QF	QF	A	2R	QF	QF	NH	1R	1R	A	0/11	F ('12)	
Hylo Open	A																		1R	A	0/1	1R ('22)	
Hong Kong Open	N/A			1R	QF	1R	W	QF	2R	2R	QF	w/d	QF	2R	1R	1R	NH			A	1/12	W ('10)	
Australian Open	N/A					A					W	QF	W	QF	w/d	A	NH		A		2/4	W ('14, '16)	
China Open	N/A			1R	1R	2R	A	1R	A	2R	W	F	1R	2R	1R	1R	NH			A	1/11	W ('14)	
China Masters	NH	N/A		A	SF	A		QF	A				w/d	A		1R	NH			A	0/3	SF ('08)	
Syed Modi International	N/A	NH				W	A		1R	NH	W	W	w/d	w/d	F	w/d	NH		w/d	A	3/5	W ('09, '14, '15)	
Odisha Open	N/A																		w/d	A	0/0		
World Superseries/Tour Finals	NH				SF	SF	DNQ	F	SF	RR	SF	RR	DNQ								0/7	F ('11)	
Macau Open	A												QF	A			NH				0/1	QF ('16)	
Philippines Open	NH		W	1R	NH	A	NH														1/2	W ('06)	
Other events
Commonwealth Games	NH		3R	NH			G	NH			A	NH			G	NH			A	NH	2/3	G ('10, '18)	
Asian Games	NH		2R	NH			QF	NH			QF	NH			B	NH				NH	0/4	B ('18)	
Asian Championships	A		2R	2R	1R	1R	B	A	2R	A		QF	B	1R	B	QF	NH		2R	A	0/12	B ('10, '16, '18)	
India Satellite	A	W	W	NH																	2/2	W ('05, '06)	
Year-end ranking						8	4	3	3	8	4	2	10	10	9	11	20	25	31	97		1	
Tournament	2004	2005	2006	2007	2008	2009	2010	2011	2012	2013	2014	2015	2016	2017	2018	2019	2020	2021	2022	2023	SR	Best	Ref

== Record against opponents ==
Record against Year-end Finals finalists, World Championships semi-finalists, and Olympic quarter-finalists. Accurate as of 22 September 2023.

Players	Matches	Results		Difference
Players	Matches	Won	Lost	Difference
(Bulgaria) Petya Nedelcheva	8	6	2	+4
(China) Chen Yufei	5	1	4	–3
(China) He Bingjiao	3	2	1	+1
(China) Li Xuerui	14	2	12	–10
(China) Lu Lan	5	4	1	+3
(China) Wang Lin	6	2	4	–2
(China) Wang Shixian	15	8	7	+1
(China) Wang Xin	7	3	4	–1
(China) Wang Yihan	17	5	12	–7
(China) Xie Xingfang	2	0	2	–2
(China) Zhang Ning	1	0	1	–1
(China) Zhang Yiman	2	0	2	–2
(China) Zhu Lin	4	2	2	0
(Chinese Taipei) Cheng Shao-chieh	4	3	1	+2
(Chinese Taipei) Tai Tzu-ying	20	5	15	–10
(Denmark) Tine Baun	10	5	5	0
(France) Pi Hongyan	7	2	5	–3
(Germany) Juliane Schenk	13	8	5	+3

Players	Matches	Results		Difference
Players	Matches	Won	Lost	Difference
(Germany) Xu Huaiwen	1	1	0	+1
(Hong Kong) Wang Chen	5	1	4	–3
(Hong Kong) Yip Pui Yin	11	9	2	+7
(Hong Kong) Zhou Mi	4	1	3	–2
(India) P. V. Sindhu	4	3	1	+2
(Indonesia) Maria Kristin Yulianti	1	0	1	–1
(Indonesia) Lindaweni Fanetri	5	4	1	+3
(Indonesia) Gregoria Mariska Tunjung	1	1	0	+1
(Japan) Minatsu Mitani	10	6	4	+2
(Japan) Nozomi Okuhara	14	9	5	+4
(Japan) Akane Yamaguchi	13	2	11	–9
(Malaysia) Wong Mew Choo	8	5	3	+2
(South Korea) An Se-young	2	1	1	0
(South Korea) Bae Yeon-ju	14	10	4	+6
(South Korea) Sung Ji-hyun	12	9	3	+6
(Spain) Carolina Marín	13	6	7	–1
(Thailand) Porntip Buranaprasertsuk	12	10	2	+8
(Thailand) Ratchanok Intanon	20	12	8	+4
