= Bae Yeon-ju =

South Korean badminton player

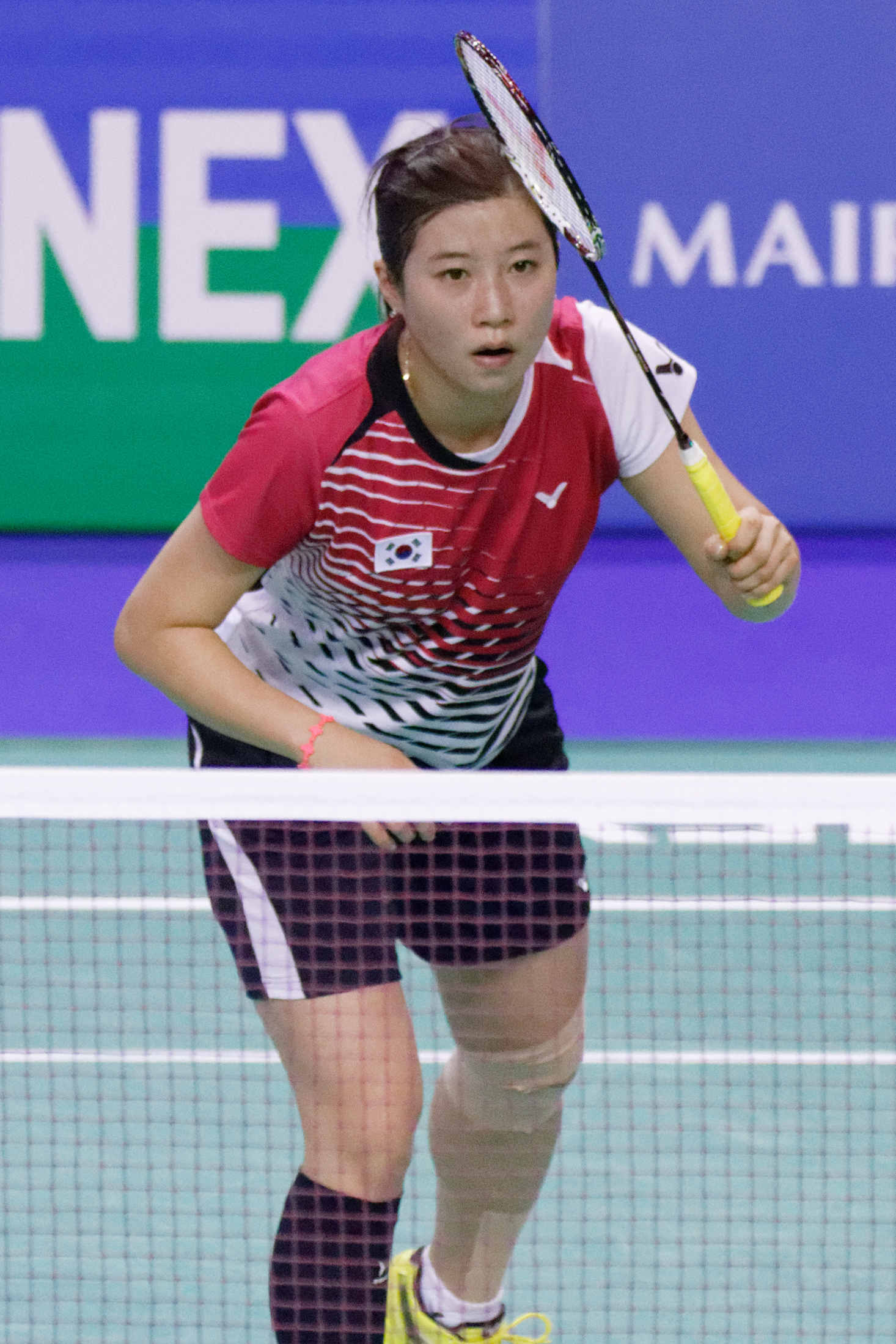
- Bae Yeon-ju at the 2013 French Super Series

Personal information
- Born: 배연주; 26 October 1990 (age 36) Masan, South Gyeongsang Province, South Korea
- Height: 1.66 m (5 ft 5 in)
- Weight: 53 kg (117 lb)

Sport
- Country: South Korea
- Sport: Badminton
- Handedness: Left

Women's singles
- Career record: 236 wins, 148 losses
- Highest ranking: 5 (23 October 2016)
- BWF profile
Medal record
Women's badminton
Representing South Korea
World Championships
Bronze medal – third place	2013 Guangzhou	Women's singles
Sudirman Cup
Silver medal – second place	2013 Kuala Lumpur	Mixed team
Bronze medal – third place	2011 Qingdao	Mixed team
Bronze medal – third place	2015 Dongguan	Mixed team
Uber Cup
Gold medal – first place	2010 Kuala Lumpur	Women's team
Silver medal – second place	2012 Wuhan	Women's team
Silver medal – second place	2016 Kunshan	Women's team
Bronze medal – third place	2014 New Delhi	Women's team
Bronze medal – third place	2008 Jakarta	Women's team
Asian Games
Silver medal – second place	2014 Incheon	Women's team
Bronze medal – third place	2010 Guangzhou	Women's team
Bronze medal – third place	2014 Incheon	Women's singles
Asia Team Championships
Bronze medal – third place	2016 Hyderabad	Women's team
World Junior Championships
Gold medal – first place	2006 Incheon	Mixed team
Silver medal – second place	2007 Waitakere City	Girls' singles
Silver medal – second place	2007 Waitakere City	Mixed team
Silver medal – second place	2008 Pune	Mixed team
Bronze medal – third place	2006 Incheon	Girls singles
Asian Junior Championships
Silver medal – second place	2008 Kuala Lumpur	Mixed team
Bronze medal – third place	2008 Kuala Lumpur	Girls' singles

Bae Yeon-ju (Korean: 배연주; Hanja: 裵延姝; Korean pronunciation: [pɛ̝.jʌn.dʑu]; born 26 October 1990) is a retired international badminton player from South Korea.

== Career ==
Bae started playing badminton at aged 10, and first gained international attention in 2006 when she reached the semifinals in the women's singles and won the gold medal as a member of the South Korean mixed team at the BWF World Junior Championships. Bae joined the South Korean national team in 2008 and in the same year she won her first international title at the Indonesia International tournament. In 2010, she became the runner-up at the BWF Superseries Finals after being defeated by Wang Shixian of China with the score 21–13, 21–15.

In 2012, she competed at the London Summer Olympics in the women's singles event, and was defeated by Wang Yihan in the round of 16. In 2013, she won the Korea Masters tournament after beating her team-mate Sung Ji-hyun with the score 21–19, 15–21, 21–9.

In 2016, she competed at the Rio Summer Olympics and was defeated in the last 16 by eventual bronze medallist Nozomi Okuhara. Bae was one of four Korean players who announced that they would be retiring from the national team at the end of the tournament.

== Achievements ==
=== BWF World Championships ===
Women's singles
Year	Venue	Opponent	Score	Result
2013	Tianhe Sports Center; Guangzhou, China	(China) Li Xuerui	5–21, 11–21	Bronze

=== Asian Games ===
Women's singles
Year	Venue	Opponent	Score	Result
2014	Gyeyang Gymnasium; Incheon, South Korea	(China) Wang Yihan	10–21, 21–12, 16–21	Bronze

=== BWF World Junior Championships ===
Girls' singles
Year	Venue	Opponent	Score	Result
2006	Samsan World Gymnasium; Incheon, South Korea	(India) Saina Nehwal	23–25, 13–21	Bronze
2007	The Trust Stadium; Waitakere City, New Zealand	(China) Wang Lin	16–21, 15–21	Silver

=== Asian Junior Championships ===
Girls' singles
Year	Venue	Opponent	Score	Result
2008	Stadium Juara; Kuala Lumpur, Malaysia	(China) Li Xuerui	21–12, 5–21, 20–22	Bronze

=== BWF Superseries ===
The BWF Superseries, launched on 14 December 2006 and implemented in 2007, is a series of elite badminton tournaments, sanctioned by Badminton World Federation (BWF). BWF Superseries has two level such as Superseries and Superseries Premier. A season of Superseries features twelve tournaments around the world, which introduced since 2011, with successful players invited to the Superseries Finals held at the year end.

Women's singles
Year	Tournament	Opponent	Score	Result
2010	Malaysia Open	(China) Wang Xin	21–19, 17–21, 6–4 retired	(silver) Runner up
2010	World Superseries Finals	(China) Wang Shixian	13–21, 15–21	(silver) Runner-up
2011	India Open	(Thailand) Porntip Buranaprasertsuk	13–21, 16–21	(silver) Runner up

BWF Super Series Finals tournament
BWF Super Series Premier tournament
BWF Super Series tournament

=== BWF Grand Prix ===
The BWF Grand Prix had two levels, the BWF Grand Prix and Grand Prix Gold. It was a series of badminton tournaments sanctioned by the Badminton World Federation (BWF) which was held from 2007 to 2017.

Women's singles
Year	Tournament	Opponent	Score	Result
2012	Australian Open	(China) Han Li	13–21, 14–21	(silver) Runner-up
2013	Korea Grand Prix Gold	(South Korea) Sung Ji-hyun	21–19, 15–21, 21–9	(gold) Winner
2015	Mexico City Grand Prix	(Japan) Sayaka Sato	15–21, 9–21	(silver) Runner-up

BWF Grand Prix Gold tournament
BWF Grand Prix tournament

=== BWF International Challenge/Series ===
Women's singles
Year	Tournament	Opponent	Score	Result
2008	Korea International	(South Korea) Kwon Hee-sook	17–21, 19–21	(silver) Runner-up
2008	Indonesia International	(Indonesia) Rosaria Yusfin Pungkasari	21–18, 23–21	(gold) Winner
2009	Singapore International	(South Korea) Bae Seung-hee	21–15, 21–14	(gold) Winner
2009	Korea International	(South Korea) Lee Yun-hwa	21–15, 21–18	(gold) Winner

BWF International Challenge tournament
BWF International Series tournament

== Record against selected opponents ==
Record against year-end Finals finalists, World Championships semi-finalists, and Olympic quarter-finalists.

Players	Matches	Results		Difference
Players	Matches	Won	Lost	Difference
(Bulgaria) Petya Nedelcheva	1	1	0	+1
(China) Chen Yufei	2	0	2	–2
(China) He Bingjiao	2	2	0	+2
(China) Li Xuerui	10	2	8	–6
(China) Lu Lan	3	2	1	+1
(China) Wang Lin	2	1	1	0
(China) Wang Shixian	22	3	19	–16
(China) Wang Xin	9	1	8	–7
(China) Wang Yihan	15	4	11	–7
(China) Xie Xingfang	1	0	1	–1
(China) Zhu Lin	1	0	1	–1
(Chinese Taipei) Cheng Shao-chieh	7	3	4	–1
(Chinese Taipei) Tai Tzu-ying	4	1	3	–2
(France) Pi Hongyan	3	1	2	–1
(Germany) Juliane Schenk	10	2	8	–6

Players	Matches	Results		Difference
Players	Matches	Won	Lost	Difference
(Hong Kong) Yip Pui Yin	5	3	2	+1
(Hong Kong) Zhou Mi	2	2	0	+2
(India) Saina Nehwal	14	4	10	–6
(India) P. V. Sindhu	5	4	1	+3
(Indonesia) Lindaweni Fanetri	4	4	0	+4
(Indonesia) Maria Kristin Yulianti	1	1	0	+1
(Japan) Minatsu Mitani	6	3	3	0
(Japan) Nozomi Okuhara	4	1	3	–2
(Japan) Akane Yamaguchi	6	2	4	–2
(Malaysia) Wong Mew Choo	1	1	0	+1
(South Korea) Sung Ji-hyun	7	4	3	+1
(Spain) Carolina Marín	1	0	1	–1
(Thailand) Porntip Buranaprasertsuk	7	5	2	+3
(Thailand) Ratchanok Intanon	7	3	4	–1
