= Susan Egelstaff =

Scottish badminton player (born 1982)

Susan Egelstaff née Susan Hughes
Personal information
- Nationality: British (Scottish)
- Born: Susan Hughes; 12 October 1982 (age 44) Glasgow, Scotland
- Height: 1.68 m (5 ft 6 in)
- Weight: 62 kg (137 lb)

Sport
- Sport: Badminton
- Handedness: Right

Women's singles
- Highest ranking: 27 (19 August 2010)
- BWF profile
Medal record
Women's badminton
Representing Scotland
Commonwealth Games
Bronze medal – third place	2002 Manchester	Mixed team
Bronze medal – third place	2006 Melbourne	Women's singles

Susan Egelstaff (born 12 October 1982; née Hughes) is a Scottish badminton player. who competed at the 2012 Summer Olympics and three Commonwealth Games.

== Biography ==
Born Susan Hughes in 1982, she represented the Scottish team at the 2002 Commonwealth Games in Manchester, England, where she competed in the badminton events, winning a bronze medal as part of the mixed team.

Four years later Hughes represented the Scottish team again at the 2006 Commonwealth Games in Melbourne, Australia, where she competed in the badminton events, and won a bronze medal in the singles.

In 2009 she married Dylan Egelstaff and played under her married name thereafter.

Egelstaff finished fourth in the singles at the 2010 Commonwealth Games in Delhi. At the 2012 Olympic Games in London, she competed for Great Britain at the badminton events. She failed to progress past the group stage, beating Maja Tvrdy but losing to the 12th seed Sayaka Sato in three games.

She was six-times singles champion and once doubles champion at the Scottish National Badminton Championships.

As of 2023, she is a sports writer for The Herald.

== Achievements ==
=== Commonwealth Games ===
Women's singles
Year	Venue	Opponent	Score	Result
2006	Melbourne Convention and Exhibition Centre; Melbourne, Australia	(Jersey) Elizabeth Cann	21–5, 13–21, 21–19	Bronze

=== BWF International Challenge/Series ===
Women's singles
Year	Tournament	Opponent	Score	Result
2011	Kharkiv International	(Germany) Olga Konon	9–21, 10–21	(silver) Runner-up
2011	Dutch International	(Canada) Michelle Li	21–18, 13–21, 21–15	(gold) Winner
2010	Irish International	(Denmark) Karina Jørgensen	23–21, 21–8	(gold) Winner
2010	European Circuit Finals	(Russia) Ella Diehl	22–20, 13–21, 16–21	(silver) Runner-up
2009	Scotland International	(Russia) Ella Diehl	21–18, 21–10	(gold) Winner
2008	Bulgarian International	(Bulgaria) Petya Nedelcheva	11–21, 15–21	(silver) Runner-up
2008	Belgian International	(Germany) Juliane Schenk	12–21, 18–21	(silver) Runner-up
2008	Le Volant d'Or de Toulouse	(Belarus) Olga Konon	18–21, 12–21	(silver) Runner-up
2006	Irish International	(Sweden) Sara Persson	19–21, 16–21	(silver) Runner-up
2006	Iceland International	(Iceland) Ragna Ingólfsdóttir	14–21, 21–11, 12–21	(silver) Runner-up
2005	Czech International	(Denmark) Tine Høy	11–4, 11–8	(gold) Winner
2005	Finnish International	(Scotland) Yuan Wemyss	11–8, 11–9	(gold) Winner
2004	Iceland International	(Scotland) Yuan Wemyss	11–7, 11–2	(gold) Winner
2004	Bulgarian International	(England) Elizabeth Cann	13–11, 1–11, 5–11	(silver) Runner-up
2004	Welsh International	(Bulgaria) Petya Nedelcheva	9–11, 8–11	(silver) Runner-up
2003	Hungarian International	(South Korea) Ha Jung-eun	11–4, 11–4	(gold) Winner
2003	Welsh International	(Russia) Ella Karachkova	6–11, 5–11	(silver) Runner-up
2003	Bulgarian International	(Bulgaria) Petya Nedelcheva	0–11, 0–11	(silver) Runner-up
2002	Iceland International	(Bulgaria) Petya Nedelcheva	3–11, 3–11	(silver) Runner-up
2000	Slovenian International	(Denmark) Anne Marie Pedersen	7–11, 11–7, 10–13	(silver) Runner-up

Women's doubles
Year	Tournament	Partner	Opponent	Score	Result
2001	Scottish International	(Scotland) Kirsteen McEwan	(Scotland) Yuan Wemyss (Scotland) Sandra Watt	4–7, 0–7, 8–6, 0–7	(silver) Runner-up

BWF International Challenge tournament
BWF International Series tournament
