= Jang Soo-young =

South Korean badminton player (born 1988)

Personal information
- Born: 22 September 1988 (age 38) Seoul, South Korea
- Height: 1.75 m (5 ft 9 in)

Sport
- Country: South Korea
- Sport: Badminton
- Handedness: Right
- Event: Women's singles & doubles
Medal record
Women's badminton
Representing South Korea
Sudirman Cup
Bronze medal – third place	2007 Glasgow	Mixed team
Uber Cup
Bronze medal – third place	2008 Jakarta	Women's team
World Junior Championships
Gold medal – first place	2006 Incheon	Mixed team
Silver medal – second place	2004 Richmond	Mixed team
Asian Junior Championships
Gold medal – first place	2006 Kuala Lumpur	Mixed team
Silver medal – second place	2002 Kuala Lumpur	Girls' team
Bronze medal – third place	2005 Jakarta	Mixed doubles
Bronze medal – third place	2005 Jakarta	Girls' team

- Jang Soo-young
- Hangul: 장수영
- Hanja: 張水榮
- RR: Jang Suyeong
- MR: Chang Suyŏng

Jang Soo-young (Korean: 장수영; born 22 September 1988) is a South Korean badminton player from the Samsung Electro-Mechanics team. She joined the Korean national team in 2003. Jang graduated from the Korea National Sport University.

== Achievements ==
=== Asian Junior Championships ===
Mixed doubles
Year	Venue	Partner	Opponent	Score	Result
2005	Tennis Indoor Senayan; Jakarta, Indonesia	(South Korea) Hong Ji-hoon	(China) Zhang Wei (China) Liao Jingmei	3–15, 4–15	Bronze

=== BWF International Challenge/Series ===
Women's singles
Year	Tournament	Opponent	Score	Result
2007	Korea International	(South Korea) Lee Yun-hwa	21–23, 15–21	(silver) Runner-up
2006	India Satellite	(India) Saina Nehwal	9–21, 14–21	(silver) Runner-up
2006	Mongolia Satellite	(South Korea) Kim Moon-hi		(gold) Winner
2006	Vietnam Satellite	(Thailand) Salakjit Ponsana	21–15, 17–21, 21–19	(gold) Winner

Women's doubles
Year	Tournament	Partner	Opponent	Score	Result
2003	Norwegian International	(South Korea) Kim Mi-young	(South Korea) Ha Jung-eun (South Korea) Oh Seul-ki	6–15, 2–15	(silver) Runner-up
2003	Canadian International	(South Korea) Kim Mi-young	(South Korea) Ha Jung-eun (South Korea) Lee Eun-woo	15–1, 16–17, 9–15	(silver) Runner-up

BWF International Challenge tournament
BWF International Series tournament

== Filmography ==
=== Television shows ===
Year	Title	Network	Role	Notes	Ref.
2021	Racket Boys	tvN	Main Cast		
