= Samsan World Gymnasium =

Arena in Incheon, South Korea

Incheon Samsan World Gymnasium
- 삼산월드체육관
- Interactive map of Incheon Samsan World Gymnasium
- Location: Bupyeongro, Incheon, South Korea
- Coordinates: 37.5077°N 126.7377°E
- Capacity: 7,140
- Surface: 43,029 m^{2}
- Public transit: Samsan Gymnasium Station

Construction
- Groundbreaking: 2004
- Opened: 2006

Tenants
- Incheon Electroland Elephants (2006–2021); Incheon Heungkuk Life Pink Spiders (2021–present)

Incheon Samsan World Gymnasium is an indoor arena in Incheon, South Korea. It has hosted numerous international tournaments such as the 2014 World Wheelchair Basketball Championship and the basketball events at the 2014 Asian Games.

The complex includes a convention center adjacent to the indoor arena. The arena was considered ground-breaking for its time as the gymnasium was planned in such a way that the spectators' seats may be rearranged to suit various sports, thus being able to host fourteen different indoor sports in addition to concerts, festivals and other events. Formerly the home ground of Korean Basketball League team Incheon Electroland Elephants, it was one of the league's earliest purpose-built basketball arenas during an era when the majority of KBL teams were "second-hand" tenants of gymnasiums originally built for other sports. The team was bought over by Korea Gas Corporation and moved to Daegu after the 2020–21 season ended due to the league policy that a team's corporate headquarters, home ground and training facilities must be located within the same vicinity.

It was repurposed for volleyball and became the new home of women's volleyball team Incheon Heungkuk Life Pink Spiders. The move coincided with the team's 50th anniversary. The Pink Spiders had previously shared the Gyeyang Gymnasium with men's team Incheon Korean Air Jumbos ever since Gyeyang Gymnasium was opened in 2013.
