= BWF World Tour Super 300 =

Fourth-highest regular tier of the BWF World Tour

The BWF World Tour Super 300 is the fourth-highest tier of regular badminton tournaments on the BWF World Tour. Classified by the Badminton World Federation (BWF) as a Level 5 event within the Grade 2 tour structure, it sits below the Super 500 tier and above the Super 100 category. Among regular World Tour events, Super 300 tournaments offer the fourth-highest ranking points and minimum prize pools.

Introduced in 2018 with the launch of the BWF World Tour, the category began with ten tournaments. The Spain Masters was added later that year as the eleventh tournament. The programme remained at eleven tournaments for the 2023–2026 cycle, with the Orléans Masters and Hylo Open joining the tier. Eight Super 300 tournaments are scheduled for the 2027–2030 cycle.

== History ==
Established in 2018, the BWF World Tour replaced the former BWF Super Series. Under the new structure, ten tournaments were designated as the inaugural Super 300 events, forming the fourth-highest regular level of the tour. The addition of the Spain Masters in July 2018 increased the category to eleven tournaments.

The initial hosting cycle was extended through 2022 after the COVID-19 pandemic severely disrupted the international sporting calendar. During the pandemic-affected 2021 season, the Hylo Open was temporarily upgraded from Super 300 to Super 500.

For the 2023–2026 cycle, the regular programme remained at eleven tournaments. The Orléans Masters and Hylo Open were promoted from Super 100, while the Australian Open moved to Super 500 and the New Zealand Open was no longer included in the hosting programme.

In March 2025, the Canada Open was reclassified from Super 500 to Super 300 for the remainder of the cycle. The Hylo Open was subsequently elevated to Super 500 status for the 2025 and 2026 seasons.

For the 2027–2030 cycle, the regular Super 300 programme will comprise eight tournaments. The Canada Open will join the hosting programme, while the German Open will be promoted to Super 500 and the Korea Masters, Spain Masters, and Syed Modi International will no longer be included at Super 300 level.

== Tournament structure ==
Through 2026, Super 300 tournaments are held over six days. They employ a straight knockout format across five disciplines: men's singles, women's singles, men's doubles, women's doubles, and mixed doubles. Each discipline has a 32-player or 32-pair main draw, comprising 28 direct entries and four places available through qualifying.

Unlike Super 1000, Super 750, and Super 500 tournaments, Super 300 events are not included among the mandatory tournaments under the BWF's player commitment regulations.

=== Ranking points ===
A Super 300 champion earns 7,000 world-ranking points. The point distribution remained unchanged when the BWF introduced enhanced scales for certain Super 1000 tournaments in April 2024.

Super 300 world-ranking points as of August 2026
Winner	Runner-up	Semi-finals	Quarter-finals	Round of 16	Round of 32	Qualifying final	First qualifying round
7,000	5,950	4,900	3,850	2,750	1,670	660	320

=== Prize money ===
Upon the category's introduction in 2018, Super 300 tournaments were required to offer a minimum prize pool of US$150,000. This threshold later increased to US$170,000 before being temporarily reduced to US$140,000 for the pandemic-affected 2021 season. It subsequently rose progressively, reaching US$250,000 by 2026.

From 2027 onward, the minimum prize pool for each event is scheduled to increase to US$290,000.

== Tournaments ==
=== Tournaments by cycle ===
Cycle	No.	Tournaments	Changes from previous cycle
2018–2022	11	Australian Open; German Open; Korea Masters; Macau Open; New Zealand Open; Spain Masters; Swiss Open; Syed Modi International; Taipei Open; Thailand Masters; U.S. Open	Inaugural World Tour cycle; the Spain Masters joined during the inaugural season and hosting agreements were subsequently extended through 2022.
2023–2026	11	German Open; Hylo Open; Korea Masters; Macau Open; Orléans Masters; Spain Masters; Swiss Open; Syed Modi International; Taipei Open; Thailand Masters; U.S. Open	The Orléans Masters and Hylo Open were promoted from Super 100; the Australian Open moved to Super 500, while the New Zealand Open was no longer included.
2027–2030	8	Canada Open; Hylo Open; Macau Open; Orléans Masters; Swiss Open; Taipei Open; Thailand Masters; U.S. Open	The Canada Open joined the regular programme and the German Open was promoted to Super 500, while the Korea Masters, Spain Masters, and Syed Modi International were not retained at Super 300 level.

=== Seasonal exceptions ===
The following individual-season reclassifications altered the regular Super 300 programme.

Season	Tournament	Circumstance
2021	Hylo Open	Temporarily upgraded from Super 300 to Super 500 for the pandemic-affected calendar.
2025–2026	Canada Open	Reclassified from Super 500 to Super 300 for the remainder of the hosting cycle.
2025–2026	Hylo Open	Elevated from Super 300 to Super 500 for both seasons.

== Titles by country ==
As of the 2026 Korea Masters

The following table lists the total number of Super 300 titles won by players from each country. The men's singles total is one lower than the other disciplines because the title at the 2022 Syed Modi International was not awarded after the final was declared a no match due to COVID-19.

Rank	Country	MS	WS	MD	WD	XD	Total
1	China	8	15	12	16	13	64
2	Japan	11	16	4	20	3	54
3	South Korea	4	8	12	11	8	43
4	Indonesia	8	4	10	7	8	37
5	Chinese Taipei	12	4	12	3	4	35
6	Thailand	3	7	3	8	8	29
7	Malaysia	1	0	14	4	8	27
8	Denmark	5	4	3	0	7.5	19.5
9	India	5	6	1	2	1	15
10	Hong Kong	4	0	0	1	6	11
11	France	6	0	0	0	2	8
12	Singapore	5	1	0	0	0	6
13	Spain	0	4	0	0	0	4
14	England	0	0	2	0	1	3
15	Canada	0	2	0	0	0	2
15	Germany	0	0	0	0	2	2
15	United States	0	2	0	0	0	2
18	Bulgaria	0	0	0	1	0	1
18	Russia	0	0	0	0	1	1
20	Netherlands	0	0	0	0	0.5	0.5
Total		72	73	73	73	73	364

== See also ==
- BWF World Tour
- List of BWF World Tour Super 300 winners
- BWF World Tour Super 500
- BWF Tour Super 100
- List of BWF Super Series winners
- BWF World Ranking
- BWF World Tour Finals
