= List of BWF World Tour Super 750 winners =

Winners of BWF World Tour Super 750 tournaments

This is a list of winners of tournaments designated as BWF World Tour Super 750 since the tier was introduced in 2018. Super 750 is a Level 3 category within the Badminton World Federation (BWF) Grade 2 structure, ranking below BWF World Tour Super 1000 and above BWF World Tour Super 500.

== Winners ==
=== 2018–2022 ===
Season	Tournament	Men's singles	Women's singles	Men's doubles	Women's doubles	Mixed doubles	Ref.
2018	Malaysia Open	(Malaysia) Lee Chong Wei	(Chinese Taipei) Tai Tzu-ying	(Japan) Takeshi Kamura (Japan) Keigo Sonoda	(Japan) Misaki Matsutomo (Japan) Ayaka Takahashi	(China) Zheng Siwei (China) Huang Yaqiong	
2018	Japan Open	(Japan) Kento Momota	(Spain) Carolina Marín	(Indonesia) Marcus Fernaldi Gideon (Indonesia) Kevin Sanjaya Sukamuljo	(Japan) Yuki Fukushima (Japan) Sayaka Hirota	(China) Zheng Siwei (China) Huang Yaqiong	
2018	Denmark Open	(Japan) Kento Momota	(Chinese Taipei) Tai Tzu-ying	(Indonesia) Marcus Fernaldi Gideon (Indonesia) Kevin Sanjaya Sukamuljo	(Japan) Yuki Fukushima (Japan) Sayaka Hirota	(China) Zheng Siwei (China) Huang Yaqiong	
2018	French Open	(China) Chen Long	(Japan) Akane Yamaguchi	(China) Han Chengkai (China) Zhou Haodong	(Japan) Mayu Matsumoto (Japan) Wakana Nagahara	(China) Zheng Siwei (China) Huang Yaqiong	
2018	Fuzhou China Open	(Japan) Kento Momota	(China) Chen Yufei	(Indonesia) Marcus Fernaldi Gideon (Indonesia) Kevin Sanjaya Sukamuljo	(South Korea) Lee So-hee (South Korea) Shin Seung-chan	(China) Zheng Siwei (China) Huang Yaqiong	
2019	Malaysia Open	(China) Lin Dan	(Chinese Taipei) Tai Tzu-ying	(China) Li Junhui (China) Liu Yuchen	(China) Chen Qingchen (China) Jia Yifan	(China) Zheng Siwei (China) Huang Yaqiong	
2019	Japan Open	(Japan) Kento Momota	(Japan) Akane Yamaguchi	(Indonesia) Marcus Fernaldi Gideon (Indonesia) Kevin Sanjaya Sukamuljo	(South Korea) Kim So-yeong (South Korea) Kong Hee-yong	(China) Wang Yilyu (China) Huang Dongping	
2019	Denmark Open	(Japan) Kento Momota	(Chinese Taipei) Tai Tzu-ying	(Indonesia) Marcus Fernaldi Gideon (Indonesia) Kevin Sanjaya Sukamuljo	(South Korea) Baek Ha-na (South Korea) Jung Kyung-eun	(Indonesia) Praveen Jordan (Indonesia) Melati Daeva Oktavianti	
2019	French Open	(China) Chen Long	(South Korea) An Se-young	(Indonesia) Marcus Fernaldi Gideon (Indonesia) Kevin Sanjaya Sukamuljo	(South Korea) Lee So-hee (South Korea) Shin Seung-chan	(Indonesia) Praveen Jordan (Indonesia) Melati Daeva Oktavianti	
2019	Fuzhou China Open	(Japan) Kento Momota	(China) Chen Yufei	(Indonesia) Marcus Fernaldi Gideon (Indonesia) Kevin Sanjaya Sukamuljo	(Japan) Yuki Fukushima (Japan) Sayaka Hirota	(China) Wang Yilyu (China) Huang Dongping	
2020	Denmark Open	(Denmark) Anders Antonsen	(Japan) Nozomi Okuhara	(England) Marcus Ellis (England) Chris Langridge	(Japan) Yuki Fukushima (Japan) Sayaka Hirota	(Germany) Mark Lamsfuß (Germany) Isabel Herttrich	
2021	French Open	(Japan) Kanta Tsuneyama	(Japan) Akane Yamaguchi	(South Korea) Ko Sung-hyun (South Korea) Shin Baek-cheol	(South Korea) Lee So-hee (South Korea) Shin Seung-chan	(Japan) Yuta Watanabe (Japan) Arisa Higashino	
2021	Indonesia Masters	(Japan) Kento Momota	(South Korea) An Se-young	(Japan) Takuro Hoki (Japan) Yugo Kobayashi	(Japan) Nami Matsuyama (Japan) Chiharu Shida	(Thailand) Dechapol Puavaranukroh (Thailand) Sapsiree Taerattanachai	
2022	Malaysia Open	(Denmark) Viktor Axelsen	(Thailand) Ratchanok Intanon	(Japan) Takuro Hoki (Japan) Yugo Kobayashi	(Indonesia) Apriyani Rahayu (Indonesia) Siti Fadia Silva Ramadhanti	(China) Zheng Siwei (China) Huang Yaqiong	
2022	Japan Open	(Japan) Kenta Nishimoto	(Japan) Akane Yamaguchi	(China) Liang Weikeng (China) Wang Chang	(South Korea) Jeong Na-eun (South Korea) Kim Hye-jeong	(Thailand) Dechapol Puavaranukroh (Thailand) Sapsiree Taerattanachai	
2022	Denmark Open	(China) Shi Yuqi	(China) He Bingjiao	(Indonesia) Fajar Alfian (Indonesia) Muhammad Rian Ardianto	(China) Chen Qingchen (China) Jia Yifan	(China) Zheng Siwei (China) Huang Yaqiong	
2022	French Open	(Denmark) Viktor Axelsen	(China) He Bingjiao	(India) Satwiksairaj Rankireddy (India) Chirag Shetty	(Malaysia) Pearly Tan (Malaysia) Thinaah Muralitharan	(China) Zheng Siwei (China) Huang Yaqiong	

=== 2023–2026 ===
Season	Tournament	Men's singles	Women's singles	Men's doubles	Women's doubles	Mixed doubles	Ref.
2023	India Open	(Thailand) Kunlavut Vitidsarn	(South Korea) An Se-young	(China) Liang Weikeng (China) Wang Chang	(Japan) Nami Matsuyama (Japan) Chiharu Shida	(Japan) Yuta Watanabe (Japan) Arisa Higashino	
2023	Singapore Open	(Indonesia) Anthony Sinisuka Ginting	(South Korea) An Se-young	(Japan) Takuro Hoki (Japan) Yugo Kobayashi	(China) Chen Qingchen (China) Jia Yifan	(Denmark) Mathias Christiansen (Denmark) Alexandra Bøje	
2023	Japan Open	(Denmark) Viktor Axelsen	(South Korea) An Se-young	(Chinese Taipei) Lee Yang (Chinese Taipei) Wang Chi-lin	(South Korea) Kim So-yeong (South Korea) Kong Hee-yong	(Japan) Yuta Watanabe (Japan) Arisa Higashino	
2023	Denmark Open	(China) Weng Hongyang	(China) Chen Yufei	(Malaysia) Aaron Chia (Malaysia) Soh Wooi Yik	(China) Chen Qingchen (China) Jia Yifan	(China) Feng Yanzhe (China) Huang Dongping	
2023	French Open	(Indonesia) Jonatan Christie	(China) Chen Yufei	(Denmark) Kim Astrup (Denmark) Anders Skaarup Rasmussen	(China) Liu Shengshu (China) Tan Ning	(China) Jiang Zhenbang (China) Wei Yaxin	
2023	China Masters	(Japan) Kodai Naraoka	(China) Chen Yufei	(China) Liang Weikeng (China) Wang Chang	(Japan) Nami Matsuyama (Japan) Chiharu Shida	(China) Zheng Siwei (China) Huang Yaqiong	
2024	India Open	(China) Shi Yuqi	(Chinese Taipei) Tai Tzu-ying	(South Korea) Kang Min-hyuk (South Korea) Seo Seung-jae	(Japan) Mayu Matsumoto (Japan) Wakana Nagahara	(Thailand) Dechapol Puavaranukroh (Thailand) Sapsiree Taerattanachai	
2024	French Open	(China) Shi Yuqi	(South Korea) An Se-young	(India) Satwiksairaj Rankireddy (India) Chirag Shetty	(China) Chen Qingchen (China) Jia Yifan	(China) Feng Yanzhe (China) Huang Dongping	
2024	Singapore Open	(China) Shi Yuqi	(South Korea) An Se-young	(China) He Jiting (China) Ren Xiangyu	(China) Chen Qingchen (China) Jia Yifan	(China) Zheng Siwei (China) Huang Yaqiong	
2024	Japan Open	(France) Alex Lanier	(Japan) Akane Yamaguchi	(Malaysia) Goh Sze Fei (Malaysia) Nur Izzuddin	(China) Liu Shengshu (China) Tan Ning	(China) Jiang Zhenbang (China) Wei Yaxin	
2024	Denmark Open	(Denmark) Anders Antonsen	(China) Wang Zhiyi	(China) Liang Weikeng (China) Wang Chang	(Japan) Rin Iwanaga (Japan) Kie Nakanishi	(China) Feng Yanzhe (China) Huang Dongping	
2024	China Masters	(Denmark) Anders Antonsen	(South Korea) An Se-young	(South Korea) Jin Yong (South Korea) Seo Seung-jae	(China) Liu Shengshu (China) Tan Ning	(China) Feng Yanzhe (China) Huang Dongping	
2025	India Open	(Denmark) Viktor Axelsen	(South Korea) An Se-young	(Malaysia) Goh Sze Fei (Malaysia) Nur Izzuddin	(Japan) Arisa Igarashi (Japan) Ayako Sakuramoto	(China) Jiang Zhenbang (China) Wei Yaxin	
2025	Singapore Open	(Thailand) Kunlavut Vitidsarn	(China) Chen Yufei	(Malaysia) Aaron Chia (Malaysia) Soh Wooi Yik	(South Korea) Kim Hye-jeong (South Korea) Kong Hee-yong	(Thailand) Dechapol Puavaranukroh (Thailand) Supissara Paewsampran	
2025	Japan Open	(China) Shi Yuqi	(South Korea) An Se-young	(South Korea) Kim Won-ho (South Korea) Seo Seung-jae	(China) Liu Shengshu (China) Tan Ning	(China) Jiang Zhenbang (China) Wei Yaxin	
2025	China Masters	(China) Weng Hongyang	(South Korea) An Se-young	(South Korea) Kim Won-ho (South Korea) Seo Seung-jae	(China) Jia Yifan (China) Zhang Shuxian	(Thailand) Dechapol Puavaranukroh (Thailand) Supissara Paewsampran	
2025	Denmark Open	(Indonesia) Jonatan Christie	(South Korea) An Se-young	(Japan) Takuro Hoki (Japan) Yugo Kobayashi	(South Korea) Baek Ha-na (South Korea) Lee So-hee	(China) Feng Yanzhe (China) Huang Dongping	
2025	French Open	(Denmark) Anders Antonsen	(South Korea) An Se-young	(South Korea) Kim Won-ho (South Korea) Seo Seung-jae	(Japan) Yuki Fukushima (Japan) Mayu Matsumoto	(China) Feng Yanzhe (China) Huang Dongping	
2026	India Open	(Chinese Taipei) Lin Chun-yi	(South Korea) An Se-young	(China) Liang Weikeng (China) Wang Chang	(China) Liu Shengshu (China) Tan Ning	(Thailand) Dechapol Puavaranukroh (Thailand) Supissara Paewsampran	
2026	Singapore Open	(France) Alex Lanier	(South Korea) An Se-young	(India) Satwiksairaj Rankireddy (India) Chirag Shetty	(China) Jia Yifan (China) Zhang Shuxian	(Denmark) Mathias Christiansen (Denmark) Alexandra Bøje	
2026	Japan Open	(France) Christo Popov	(India) P. V. Sindhu	(Indonesia) Fajar Alfian (Indonesia) Muhammad Shohibul Fikri	(South Korea) Kim Hye-jeong (South Korea) Kong Hee-yong	(China) Feng Yanzhe (China) Huang Dongping	
2026	China Masters	(Hong Kong) Jason Gunawan	(South Korea) An Se-young	(India) Satwiksairaj Rankireddy (India) Chirag Shetty	(Japan) Sumire Nakade (Japan) Miyu Takahashi	(China) Feng Yanzhe (China) Huang Dongping	
2026	Denmark Open	(France) Alex Lanier	(South Korea) An Se-young	(Indonesia) Fajar Alfian (Indonesia) Muhammad Shohibul Fikri	(Malaysia) Pearly Tan (Malaysia) Thinaah Muralitharan	(China) Jiang Zhenbang (China) Wei Yaxin	
2026	French Open	(France) Christo Popov	(South Korea) An Se-young	(Malaysia) Man Wei Chong (Malaysia) Tee Kai Wun	(Japan) Yuki Fukushima (Japan) Mayu Matsumoto	(China) Feng Yanzhe (China) Huang Dongping	

== Records and statistics ==
As of the 2026 French Open

The following statistics cover completed Super 750 tournaments. In doubles events, each player in a winning partnership is credited with one title.

=== Most titles overall ===
The table below lists players who have won at least seven Super 750 titles across all disciplines.

Rank	Player	Discipline	Titles
1	(South Korea) An Se-young	Women's singles	18
2	(China) Huang Dongping	Mixed doubles	11
2	(China) Huang Yaqiong	Mixed doubles	11
2	(China) Zheng Siwei	Mixed doubles	11
5	(China) Feng Yanzhe	Mixed doubles	9
6	(China) Jia Yifan	Women's doubles	8
7	(Indonesia) Marcus Fernaldi Gideon	Men's doubles	7
7	(Indonesia) Kevin Sanjaya Sukamuljo	Men's doubles	7
7	(Japan) Kento Momota	Men's singles	7

=== Most titles by event ===
These tables list the leading Super 750 title winners in each of the five disciplines.

==== Men's singles ====
Rank	Player	Titles
1	(Japan) Kento Momota	7
2	(China) Shi Yuqi	5
3	(Denmark) Anders Antonsen	4
3	(Denmark) Viktor Axelsen	4
5	(France) Alex Lanier	3
6	(China) Chen Long	2
6	(China) Weng Hongyang	2
6	(France) Christo Popov	2
6	(Indonesia) Jonatan Christie	2
6	(Thailand) Kunlavut Vitidsarn	2

==== Women's singles ====
Rank	Player	Titles
1	(South Korea) An Se-young	18
2	(China) Chen Yufei	6
3	(Chinese Taipei) Tai Tzu-ying	5
3	(Japan) Akane Yamaguchi	5
5	(China) He Bingjiao	2

==== Men's doubles ====
Rank	Player	Titles
1	(Indonesia) Marcus Fernaldi Gideon	7
1	(Indonesia) Kevin Sanjaya Sukamuljo	7
3	(China) Liang Weikeng	5
3	(China) Wang Chang	5
3	(South Korea) Seo Seung-jae	5

==== Women's doubles ====
Rank	Player	Titles
1	(China) Jia Yifan	8
2	(China) Chen Qingchen	6
2	(Japan) Yuki Fukushima	6
4	(China) Liu Shengshu	5
4	(China) Tan Ning	5

==== Mixed doubles ====
Rank	Player	Titles
1	(China) Huang Dongping	11
1	(China) Huang Yaqiong	11
1	(China) Zheng Siwei	11
4	(China) Feng Yanzhe	9
5	(Thailand) Dechapol Puavaranukroh	6

=== Youngest and oldest champions ===
An Se-young is the youngest Super 750 champion overall, having won the 2019 French Open women's singles title, while Lee Chong Wei is the oldest, having won the 2018 Malaysia Open men's singles title. Players' ages are calculated as of the final day of the tournament at which the record was set.

Event	Youngest champion			Oldest champion		
Event	Player	Age	Tournament	Player	Age	Tournament
Men's singles	(France) Alex Lanier	19 years, 212 days	2024 Japan Open	(Malaysia) Lee Chong Wei	35 years, 253 days	2018 Malaysia Open
Women's singles	(South Korea) An Se-young	17 years, 264 days	2019 French Open	(India) P. V. Sindhu	31 years, 14 days	2026 Japan Open
Men's doubles	(China) Zhou Haodong	20 years, 250 days	2018 French Open	(England) Chris Langridge	35 years, 169 days	2020 Denmark Open
Women's doubles	(South Korea) Baek Ha-na	19 years, 28 days	2019 Denmark Open	(Japan) Yuki Fukushima	33 years, 172 days	2026 French Open
Mixed doubles	(China) Zheng Siwei	21 years, 125 days	2018 Malaysia Open	(Denmark) Mathias Christiansen	32 years, 100 days	2026 Singapore Open

Highlighted cells indicate the youngest and oldest Super 750 champions overall.

== See also ==
- BWF World Tour Finals
- List of BWF World Tour Super 1000 winners
