= BWF World Tour Super 750 =

Second-highest regular tier of the BWF World Tour

The BWF World Tour Super 750 is the second-highest regular tier of badminton tournaments on the Badminton World Federation (BWF) World Tour. Classified as a Level 3 event within the BWF Grade 2 tour structure, it ranks directly below the Super 1000 tier and above the Super 500 tier. Among regular World Tour events, Super 750 tournaments offer the second-highest allocation of world-ranking points and minimum prize money.

== History ==
Established in 2018, the BWF World Tour replaced the former BWF Super Series. Under the new structure, five tournaments were initially designated as Super 750 events: the Fuzhou China Open, Denmark Open, French Open, Japan Open, and Malaysia Open.

Due to calendar disruptions caused by the COVID-19 pandemic, the initial hosting cycle was extended through 2022. Temporary adjustments were made during the 2021 season: the Indonesia Masters was temporarily upgraded from Super 500 to Super 750 status, while the Denmark Open was temporarily elevated to Super 1000. Additionally, the Fuzhou China Open was cancelled in 2020, 2021, and 2022.

For the 2023–2026 hosting cycle, the tier expanded to six tournaments. The India Open and Singapore Open were promoted from Super 500 status, the Malaysia Open was elevated to Super 1000, and the Chinese event returned under the China Masters title.

For the 2027–2030 cycle, the tier will reduce back to five events. The Hong Kong Open will be promoted from Super 500, the Denmark Open will advance to Super 1000, and the Singapore Open will return to Super 500 status.

== Tournament structure and regulations ==
Through 2026, Super 750 tournaments take place over six days. They operate under a straight single-elimination knockout format with no qualifying rounds. Main draws feature 32 players or 32 pairs across five disciplines: men's singles, women's singles, men's doubles, women's doubles, and mixed doubles.

Under BWF player commitment regulations for the 2023–2026 cycle, the top 15 singles players and top 10 doubles pairs in the BWF world rankings are mandated to enter all six Super 750 tournaments, subject to specific BWF exemptions.

== Ranking points and prize money ==
=== Ranking points ===
The winner of a Super 750 tournament receives 11,000 BWF world-ranking points. Unlike the enhanced point scales introduced for select Super 1000 events in April 2024, the Super 750 point distribution remained unchanged and is in effect as of August 2026.

Super 750 world-ranking points as of August 2026
Winner	Runner-up	Semi-finals	Quarter-finals	Round of 16	Round of 32
11,000	9,350	7,700	6,050	4,320	2,660

=== Prize money ===
Upon its introduction in 2018, Super 750 events required a minimum prize pool of US$700,000. After increasing to US$750,000, minimum prize money was temporarily reduced to US$600,000 for the pandemic-affected 2021 season. Prize pools subsequently increased progressively, reaching US$950,000 by 2026. Beginning in 2027, the minimum prize pool for each tournament is scheduled to increase to US$1.1 million.

== Tournaments ==
=== Tournaments by cycle ===
Cycle	No.	Tournaments	Changes from previous cycle
2018–2022	5	Denmark Open; French Open; Fuzhou China Open; Japan Open; Malaysia Open	Inaugural BWF World Tour cycle; hosting agreements were extended through 2022.
2023–2026	6	China Masters; Denmark Open; French Open; India Open; Japan Open; Singapore Open	India Open and Singapore Open promoted from Super 500; Malaysia Open promoted to Super 1000; China event returned as China Masters.
2027–2030	5	China Masters; French Open; Hong Kong Open; India Open; Japan Open	Hong Kong Open promoted from Super 500; Denmark Open promoted to Super 1000; Singapore Open returned to Super 500.

=== Seasonal exceptions ===
The following individual-season reclassifications altered the regular Super 750 programme during the pandemic-affected 2021 season. In addition, the Fuzhou China Open was cancelled in 2020, 2021, and 2022.

Season	Tournament	Circumstance
2021	Indonesia Masters	Temporarily upgraded from Super 500 to Super 750.
2021	Denmark Open	Temporarily upgraded from Super 750 to Super 1000.

== Titles by country ==
As of the 2026 French Open

The following table lists the total number of Super 750 titles won by players from each country.

Rank	Country	MS	WS	MD	WD	XD	Total
1	China	10	9	8	13	27	67
2	Japan	10	6	5	15	3	39
3	South Korea	0	18	6	10	0	34
4	Indonesia	3	0	10	1	2	16
5	Denmark	8	0	1	0	2	11
6	Thailand	2	1	0	0	6	9
7	Malaysia	1	0	5	2	0	8
8	Chinese Taipei	1	5	1	0	0	7
9	India	0	1	4	0	0	5
9	France	5	0	0	0	0	5
11	England	0	0	1	0	0	1
11	Germany	0	0	0	0	1	1
11	Hong Kong	1	0	0	0	0	1
11	Spain	0	1	0	0	0	1
Total		41	41	41	41	41	205

== See also ==
- BWF World Tour
- List of BWF World Tour Super 750 winners
- BWF World Tour Super 1000
- BWF World Tour Super 500
- List of BWF Super Series winners
- BWF World Ranking
- BWF World Tour Finals
