= BWF World Tour Super 500 =

Third-highest regular tier of the BWF World Tour

The BWF World Tour Super 500 is the third-highest tier of regular badminton tournaments on the BWF World Tour. Classified by the Badminton World Federation (BWF) as a Level 4 event within the Grade 2 tour structure, it sits below the Super 750 tier and above the Super 300 tier. Among regular World Tour events, Super 500 tournaments offer the third-highest ranking points and minimum prize pools.

Introduced in 2018 with the launch of the BWF World Tour, the category initially comprised seven tournaments: the Hong Kong Open, India Open, Indonesia Masters, Korea Open, Malaysia Masters, Singapore Open, and Thailand Open. The tier expanded to nine tournaments for the 2023–2026 cycle. The Arctic Open, Australian Open, Canada Open, and Japan Masters joined the tier, while the India and Singapore Opens were promoted to Super 750 status. Nine Super 500 tournaments are also scheduled for the 2027–2030 cycle, with the German Open joining the tier, the Singapore Open returning from Super 750, and the Hong Kong Open being promoted to Super 750.

== History ==
Established in 2018, the BWF World Tour replaced the former BWF Super Series. Under this new structure, seven tournaments were designated as the inaugural Super 500 events, forming the third-highest regular level of the tour.

The initial hosting cycle was extended through 2022 after the COVID-19 pandemic severely disrupted the international sporting calendar. During the pandemic-affected 2021 season, the Hylo Open was designated as a Super 500 tournament, while the Indonesia Masters was temporarily upgraded from Super 500 to Super 750.

For the 2023–2026 cycle, the regular Super 500 programme expanded from seven to nine tournaments. The Arctic Open, Australian Open, Canada Open, and Japan Masters joined the tier, while the India and Singapore Opens were promoted to Super 750 status.

In March 2025, the Canada Open was reclassified as a Super 300 tournament for the remainder of the cycle. The Hylo Open was subsequently elevated to Super 500 status for the 2025 and 2026 seasons.

For the 2027–2030 cycle, the programme will remain at nine tournaments. The German Open will join the category and the Singapore Open will return from Super 750, while the Hong Kong Open will be promoted to Super 750 status.

== Tournament structure ==
Through 2026, Super 500 tournaments are held over six days. They employ a straight knockout format across five disciplines: men's singles, women's singles, men's doubles, women's doubles, and mixed doubles. Each discipline has a 32-player or 32-pair main draw, comprising 28 direct entries and four places available through qualifying.

Super 500 tournaments are included in the BWF's player commitment regulations. During the 2023–2026 cycle, the top 15 singles players and top 10 doubles pairs in the BWF world rankings are required to enter at least two of the nine Super 500 tournaments, subject to specific BWF exemptions.

=== Ranking points ===
A Super 500 champion earns 9,200 world-ranking points. The point distribution remained unchanged when the BWF introduced enhanced scales for certain Super 1000 tournaments in April 2024.

Super 500 world-ranking points as of August 2026
| Winner | Runner-up | Semi-finals | Quarter-finals | Round of 16 | Round of 32 | Qualifying final | First qualifying round |
|---|---|---|---|---|---|---|---|
| 9,200 | 7,800 | 6,420 | 5,040 | 3,600 | 2,220 | 880 | 430 |

=== Prize money ===
Upon the category's introduction in 2018, Super 500 tournaments were required to offer a minimum prize pool of US$350,000. This threshold later increased to US$400,000 before being temporarily reduced to US$320,000 for the pandemic-affected 2021 season. It subsequently rose progressively, reaching US$500,000 by 2026.

From 2027 onward, the minimum prize pool for each event is scheduled to increase to US$560,000.

== Tournaments ==
=== Tournaments by cycle ===
| Cycle | No. | Tournaments | Changes from previous cycle |
|---|---|---|---|
| 2018–2022 | 7 | Hong Kong Open; India Open; Indonesia Masters; Korea Open; Malaysia Masters; Singapore Open; Thailand Open | Inaugural World Tour cycle; hosting agreements were extended through 2022. |
| 2023–2026 | 9 | Arctic Open; Australian Open; Canada Open; Hong Kong Open; Indonesia Masters; Japan Masters; Korea Open; Malaysia Masters; Thailand Open | The Arctic Open, Australian Open, Canada Open, and Japan Masters joined the tier, while the India and Singapore Opens were promoted to Super 750 status. |
| 2027–2030 | 9 | Arctic Open; Australian Open; German Open; Indonesia Masters; Japan Masters; Korea Open; Malaysia Masters; Singapore Open; Thailand Open | The German Open joined and the Singapore Open returned at Super 500 level, while the Hong Kong Open was promoted to Super 750. |

=== Seasonal exceptions ===
The following individual-season reclassifications altered the regular Super 500 programme.

| Season | Tournament | Circumstance |
|---|---|---|
| 2021 | Hylo Open | Designated as a Super 500 tournament for the pandemic-affected calendar. |
| 2021 | Indonesia Masters | Temporarily upgraded from Super 500 to Super 750. |
| 2025–2026 | Canada Open | Reclassified from Super 500 to Super 300 for the remainder of the hosting cycle. |
| 2025–2026 | Hylo Open | Elevated to Super 500 for both seasons. |

== Titles by country ==
As of the 2026 Hong Kong Open

The following table lists the total number of Super 500 titles won by players from each country.

| Rank | Country | MS | WS | MD | WD | XD | Total |
|---|---|---|---|---|---|---|---|
| 1 | China | 8 | 15 | 5 | 16 | 32 | 76 |
| 2 | Japan | 6 | 14 | 4 | 17 | 5 | 46 |
| 3 | Indonesia | 10 | 1 | 19 | 8 | 1 | 39 |
| 4 | South Korea | 2 | 8 | 9 | 8 | 1 | 28 |
| 5 | Denmark | 12 | 2 | 7 | 1 | 4 | 26 |
| 6 | Malaysia | 4 | 0 | 8 | 6 | 6 | 24 |
| 7 | Thailand | 3 | 11 | 0 | 2 | 7 | 23 |
| 8 | India | 6 | 3 | 4 | 0 | 0 | 13 |
| 9 | Chinese Taipei | 5 | 3 | 2 | 0 | 0 | 10 |
| 10 | France | 0 | 0 | 0 | 1 | 1 | 2 |
| 10 | Hong Kong | 1 | 0 | 0 | 0 | 1 | 2 |
| 10 | Singapore | 1 | 0 | 0 | 0 | 1 | 2 |
| 10 | United States | 0 | 2 | 0 | 0 | 0 | 2 |
| 14 | Canada | 1 | 0 | 0 | 0 | 0 | 1 |
| 14 | England | 0 | 0 | 1 | 0 | 0 | 1 |
| Total | | 59 | 59 | 59 | 59 | 59 | 295 |

== See also ==
- BWF World Tour
- List of BWF World Tour Super 500 winners
- BWF World Tour Super 750
- BWF World Tour Super 300
- List of BWF Super Series winners
- BWF World Ranking
- BWF World Tour Finals
