= List of BWF Super Series winners =

The list below consists of the BWF Super Series winners (including Super Series Masters Final) in every season.

== 2007 ==
Tour	Men's singles	Women's singles	Men's doubles	Women's doubles	Mixed doubles
Malaysia	(Denmark) Peter Gade	(China) Zhu Lin	(Malaysia) Koo Kien Keat (Malaysia) Tan Boon Heong	(China) Gao Ling (China) Huang Sui	(China) Zheng Bo (China) Gao Ling
Korea	(China) Lin Dan	(China) Xie Xingfang	(South Korea) Jung Jae-sung (South Korea) Lee Yong-dae	(China) Gao Ling (China) Huang Sui	(China) Zheng Bo (China) Gao Ling
England	(China) Lin Dan	(China) Xie Xingfang	(Malaysia) Koo Kien Keat (Malaysia) Tan Boon Heong	(China) Wei Yili (China) Zhang Yawen	(China) Zheng Bo (China) Gao Ling
Swiss	(China) Chen Jin	(China) Zhang Ning	(Malaysia) Koo Kien Keat (Malaysia) Tan Boon Heong	(China) Zhao Tingting (China) Yang Wei	(South Korea) Lee Yong-dae (South Korea) Lee Hyo-jung
Singapore	(Thailand) Boonsak Ponsana	(China) Zhang Ning	(China) Fu Haifeng (China) Cai Yun	(China) Wei Yili (China) Zhang Yawen	(Indonesia) Flandy Limpele (Indonesia) Vita Marissa
Indonesia	(Malaysia) Lee Chong Wei	(Hong Kong) Wang Chen	(China) Fu Haifeng (China) Cai Yun	(China) Du Jing (China) Yu Yang	(China) Zheng Bo (China) Gao Ling
China Masters	(China) Lin Dan	(China) Xie Xingfang	(China) Fu Haifeng (China) Cai Yun	(Indonesia) Liliyana Natsir (Indonesia) Vita Marissa	(China) Zheng Bo (China) Gao Ling
Japan	(Malaysia) Lee Chong Wei	(Denmark) Tine Rasmussen	(United States) Tony Gunawan (Indonesia) Candra Wijaya	(China) Yang Wei (China) Zhang Jiewen	(China) Zheng Bo (China) Gao Ling
Denmark	(China) Lin Dan	(China) Lu Lan	(Malaysia) Koo Kien Keat (Malaysia) Tan Boon Heong	(China) Yang Wei (China) Zhang Jiewen	(China) He Hanbin (China) Yu Yang
French	(Malaysia) Lee Chong Wei	(China) Xie Xingfang	(China) Fu Haifeng (China) Cai Yun	(China) Yang Wei (China) Zhang Jiewen	(Indonesia) Flandy Limpele (Indonesia) Vita Marissa
China Open	(China) Bao Chunlai	(Malaysia) Wong Mew Choo	(Indonesia) Markis Kido (Indonesia) Hendra Setiawan	(China) Gao Ling (China) Zhao Tingting	(Indonesia) Nova Widianto (Indonesia) Liliyana Natsir
Hong Kong	(China) Lin Dan	(China) Xie Xingfang	(Indonesia) Markis Kido (Indonesia) Hendra Setiawan	(China) Du Jing (China) Yu Yang	(Indonesia) Nova Widianto (Indonesia) Liliyana Natsir

Most win: 9 titles

- (China) Gao Ling

== 2008 ==
Tour	Men's singles	Women's singles	Men's doubles	Women's doubles	Mixed doubles
Malaysia	(Malaysia) Lee Chong Wei	(Denmark) Tine Rasmussen	(Indonesia) Markis Kido (Indonesia) Hendra Setiawan	(China) Yang Wei (China) Zhang Jiewen	(China) He Hanbin (China) Yu Yang
Korea	(South Korea) Lee Hyun-il	(Hong Kong) Zhou Mi	(China) Fu Haifeng (China) Cai Yun	(China) Du Jing (China) Yu Yang	(South Korea) Lee Yong-dae (South Korea) Lee Hyo-jung
England	(China) Chen Jin	(Denmark) Tine Rasmussen	(South Korea) Jung Jae-sung (South Korea) Lee Yong-dae	(South Korea) Lee Hyo-jung (South Korea) Lee Kyung-won	(China) Zheng Bo (China) Gao Ling
Swiss	(China) Lin Dan	(China) Xie Xingfang	(South Korea) Jung Jae-sung (South Korea) Lee Yong-dae	(China) Yang Wei (China) Zhang Jiewen	(China) He Hanbin (China) Yu Yang
Singapore	(Malaysia) Lee Chong Wei	(Denmark) Tine Rasmussen	(Malaysia) Zakry Abdul Latif (Malaysia) Fairuzizuan Mohd Tazari	(China) Du Jing (China) Yu Yang	(Indonesia) Nova Widianto (Indonesia) Liliyana Natsir
Indonesia	(Indonesia) Sony Dwi Kuncoro	(China) Zhu Lin	(Malaysia) Zakry Abdul Latif (Malaysia) Fairuzizuan Mohd Tazari	(Indonesia) Vita Marissa (Indonesia) Liliyana Natsir	(China) Zheng Bo (China) Gao Ling
Japan	(Indonesia) Sony Dwi Kuncoro	(China) Wang Yihan	(Denmark) Lars Paaske (Denmark) Jonas Rasmussen	(China) Cheng Shu (China) Zhao Yunlei	(Indonesia) Muhammad Rijal (Indonesia) Vita Marissa
China Masters	(Indonesia) Sony Dwi Kuncoro	(Hong Kong) Zhou Mi	(Indonesia) Markis Kido (Indonesia) Hendra Setiawan	(China) Cheng Shu (China) Zhao Yunlei	(China) Xie Zhongbo (China) Zhang Yawen
Denmark	(Denmark) Peter Gade	(China) Wang Lin	(Indonesia) Markis Kido (Indonesia) Hendra Setiawan	(Malaysia) Wong Pei Tty (Malaysia) Chin Eei Hui	(Denmark) Joachim Fischer Nielsen (Denmark) Christinna Pedersen
French	(Denmark) Peter Gade	(China) Wang Lin	(Indonesia) Markis Kido (Indonesia) Hendra Setiawan	(China) Du Jing (China) Yu Yang	(China) He Hanbin (China) Yu Yang
China Open	(China) Lin Dan	(China) Jiang Yanjiao	(South Korea) Jung Jae-sung (South Korea) Lee Yong-dae	(China) Zhang Yawen (China) Zhao Tingting	(South Korea) Lee Yong-dae (South Korea) Lee Hyo-jung
Hong Kong	(China) Chen Jin	(Hong Kong) Wang Chen	(South Korea) Jung Jae-sung (South Korea) Lee Yong-dae	(China) Zhang Yawen (China) Zhao Tingting	(China) Xie Zhongbo (China) Zhang Yawen
Masters Finals	(Malaysia) Lee Chong Wei	(Hong Kong) Zhou Mi	(Malaysia) Koo Kien Keat (Malaysia) Tan Boon Heong	(Malaysia) Chin Eei Hui (Malaysia) Wong Pei Tty	(Denmark) Thomas Laybourn (Denmark) Kamilla Rytter Juhl

Most win: 6 titles

- (China) Yu Yang

== 2009 ==
Tour	Men's singles	Women's singles	Men's doubles	Women's doubles	Mixed doubles
Malaysia	(Malaysia) Lee Chong Wei	(Denmark) Tine Rasmussen	(South Korea) Jung Jae-sung (South Korea) Lee Yong-dae	(South Korea) Lee Hyo-jung (South Korea) Lee Kyung-won	(Indonesia) Nova Widianto (Indonesia) Liliyana Natsir
(South Korea) Korea	(Denmark) Peter Gade	(Denmark) Tine Rasmussen	(Denmark) Mathias Boe (Denmark) Carsten Mogensen	(Chinese Taipei) Cheng Wen-hsing (Chinese Taipei) Chien Yu-chin	(South Korea) Lee Yong-dae (South Korea) Lee Hyo-jung
England	(China) Lin Dan	(China) Wang Yihan	(China) Cai Yun (China) Fu Haifeng	(China) Zhang Yawen (China) Zhao Tingting	(China) He Hanbin (China) Yu Yang
(Switzerland) Swiss	(Malaysia) Lee Chong Wei	(China) Wang Yihan	(Malaysia) Koo Kien Keat (Malaysia) Tan Boon Heong	(China) Du Jing (China) Yu Yang	(China) Zheng Bo (China) Ma Jin
Singapore	(China) Bao Chunlai	(Hong Kong) Zhou Mi	(England) Anthony Clark (England) Nathan Robertson	(China) Zhang Yawen (China) Zhao Tingting	(China) Zheng Bo (China) Ma Jin
Indonesia	(Malaysia) Lee Chong Wei	(India) Saina Nehwal	(South Korea) Jung Jae-sung (South Korea) Lee Yong-dae	(Malaysia) Chin Eei Hui (Malaysia) Wong Pei Tty	(China) Zheng Bo (China) Ma Jin
China Masters	(China) Lin Dan	(China) Wang Shixian	(China) Guo Zhendong (China) Xu Chen	(China) Du Jing (China) Yu Yang	(China) Tao Jiaming (China) Wang Xiaoli
Japan	(China) Bao Chunlai	(China) Wang Yihan	(Indonesia) Markis Kido (Indonesia) Hendra Setiawan	(China) Ma Jin (China) Wang Xiaoli	(Thailand) Songphon Anugritayawon (Thailand) Kunchala Voravichitchaikul
Denmark	(Indonesia) Simon Santoso	(Denmark) Tine Rasmussen	(Malaysia) Koo Kien Keat (Malaysia) Tan Boon Heong	(China) Pan Pan (China) Zhang Yawen	(Denmark) Joachim Fischer Nielsen (Denmark) Christinna Pedersen
(France) French	(China) Lin Dan	(China) Wang Yihan	(Indonesia) Markis Kido (Indonesia) Hendra Setiawan	(China) Ma Jin (China) Wang Xiaoli	(Indonesia) Nova Widianto (Indonesia) Liliyana Natsir
Hong Kong	(Malaysia) Lee Chong Wei	(China) Wang Yihan	(South Korea) Jung Jae-sung (South Korea) Lee Yong-dae	(China) Ma Jin (China) Wang Xiaoli	(Poland) Robert Mateusiak (Poland) Nadieżda Kostiuczyk
China Open	(China) Lin Dan	(China) Jiang Yanjiao	(South Korea) Jung Jae-sung (South Korea) Lee Yong-dae	(China) Tian Qing (China) Zhang Yawen	(South Korea) Lee Yong-dae (South Korea) Lee Hyo-jung
(Malaysia) Masters Finals	(Malaysia) Lee Chong Wei	(Malaysia) Wong Mew Choo	(South Korea) Jung Jae-sung (South Korea) Lee Yong-dae	(Malaysia) Wong Pei Tty (Malaysia) Chin Eei Hui	(Denmark) Joachim Fischer Nielsen (Denmark) Christinna Pedersen

Most win: 7 titles

- (South Korea) Lee Yong-dae

== 2010 ==
Tour	Men's singles	Women's singles	Men's doubles	Women's doubles	Mixed doubles
(South Korea) Korea	(Malaysia) Lee Chong Wei	(China) Wang Shixian	(South Korea) Jung Jae-sung (South Korea) Lee Yong-dae	(China) Cheng Shu (China) Zhao Yunlei	(China) He Hanbin (China) Yu Yang
Malaysia	(Malaysia) Lee Chong Wei	(China) Wang Xin	(Malaysia) Koo Kien Keat (Malaysia) Tan Boon Heong	(China) Du Jing (China) Yu Yang	(China) Tao Jiaming (China) Zhang Yawen
England	(Malaysia) Lee Chong Wei	(Denmark) Tine Rasmussen	(Denmark) Lars Paaske (Denmark) Jonas Rasmussen	(China) Du Jing (China) Yu Yang	(China) Zhang Nan (China) Zhao Yunlei
(Switzerland) Swiss	(China) Chen Jin	(China) Wang Shixian	(South Korea) Ko Sung-hyun (South Korea) Yoo Yeon-seong	(China) Tian Qing (China) Yu Yang	(South Korea) Lee Yong-dae (South Korea) Lee Hyo-jung
Singapore	(Indonesia) Sony Dwi Kuncoro	(India) Saina Nehwal	(Chinese Taipei) Fang Chieh-min (Chinese Taipei) Lee Sheng-mu	(Singapore) Shinta Mulia Sari (Singapore) Yao Lei	(Denmark) Thomas Laybourn (Denmark) Kamilla Rytter Juhl
Indonesia	(Malaysia) Lee Chong Wei	(India) Saina Nehwal	(Chinese Taipei) Fang Chieh-min (Chinese Taipei) Lee Sheng-mu	(South Korea) Lee Hyo-jung (South Korea) Kim Min-jung	(Poland) Robert Mateusiak (Poland) Nadieżda Zięba
China Masters	(China) Lin Dan	(China) Wang Xin	(China) Cai Yun (China) Fu Haifeng	(China) Wang Xiaoli (China) Yu Yang	(China) Tao Jiaming (China) Tian Qing
Japan	(Malaysia) Lee Chong Wei	(China) Jiang Yanjiao	(China) Cai Yun (China) Fu Haifeng	(China) Wang Xiaoli (China) Yu Yang	(China) Zhang Nan (China) Zhao Yunlei
Denmark	(Denmark) Jan Ø. Jørgensen	(China) Wang Yihan	(Denmark) Mathias Boe (Denmark) Carsten Mogensen	(Japan) Miyuki Maeda (Japan) Satoko Suetsuna	(Denmark) Thomas Laybourn (Denmark) Kamilla Rytter Juhl
(France) French	(Indonesia) Taufik Hidayat	(China) Wang Yihan	(Denmark) Mathias Boe (Denmark) Carsten Mogensen	(Thailand) Duanganong Aroonkesorn (Thailand) Kunchala Voravichitchaikul	(Thailand) Sudket Prapakamol (Thailand) Saralee Thungthongkam
China Open	(China) Chen Long	(China) Jiang Yanjiao	(South Korea) Jung Jae-sung (South Korea) Lee Yong-dae	(China) Cheng Shu (China) Zhao Yunlei	(China) Tao Jiaming (China) Tian Qing
Hong Kong	(Malaysia) Lee Chong Wei	(India) Saina Nehwal	(South Korea) Ko Sung-hyun (South Korea) Yoo Yeon-seong	(China) Wang Xiaoli (China) Yu Yang	(Denmark) Joachim Fischer Nielsen (Denmark) Christinna Pedersen
(Chinese Taipei) Masters Finals	(Malaysia) Lee Chong Wei	(China) Wang Shixian	(Denmark) Mathias Boe (Denmark) Carsten Mogensen	(China) Wang Xiaoli (China) Yu Yang	(China) Zhang Nan (China) Zhao Yunlei

Most win: 8 titles

- (China) Yu Yang

== 2011 ==
Tour	Men's singles	Women's singles	Men's doubles	Women's doubles	Mixed doubles
Malaysia	(Malaysia) Lee Chong Wei	(China) Wang Shixian	(China) Chai Biao (China) Guo Zhendong	(China) Tian Qing (China) Zhao Yunlei	(China) He Hanbin (China) Ma Jin
(South Korea) Korea	(China) Lin Dan	(China) Wang Yihan	(South Korea) Jung Jae-sung (South Korea) Lee Yong-dae	(China) Wang Xiaoli (China) Yu Yang	(China) Zhang Nan (China) Zhao Yunlei
All England	(Malaysia) Lee Chong Wei	(China) Wang Shixian	(Denmark) Mathias Boe (Denmark) Carsten Mogensen	(China) Wang Xiaoli (China) Yu Yang	(China) Xu Chen (China) Ma Jin
India	(Malaysia) Lee Chong Wei	(Thailand) Porntip Buranaprasertsuk	(Japan) Hirokatsu Hashimoto (Japan) Noriyasu Hirata	(Japan) Miyuki Maeda (Japan) Satoko Suetsuna	(Indonesia) Tontowi Ahmad (Indonesia) Liliyana Natsir
Singapore	(China) Chen Jin	(China) Wang Xin	(China) Cai Yun (China) Fu Haifeng	(China) Tian Qing (China) Zhao Yunlei	(Indonesia) Tontowi Ahmad (Indonesia) Liliyana Natsir
Indonesia	(Malaysia) Lee Chong Wei	(China) Wang Yihan	(China) Cai Yun (China) Fu Haifeng	(China) Wang Xiaoli (China) Yu Yang	(China) Zhang Nan (China) Zhao Yunlei
China Masters	(China) Chen Long	(China) Wang Shixian	(South Korea) Jung Jae-sung (South Korea) Lee Yong-dae	(China) Xia Huan (China) Tang Jinhua	(China) Xu Chen (China) Ma Jin
Japan	(China) Chen Long	(China) Wang Yihan	(China) Cai Yun (China) Fu Haifeng	(China) Bao Yixin (China) Zhong Qianxin	(Chinese Taipei) Chen Hung-ling (Chinese Taipei) Cheng Wen-hsing
Denmark	(China) Chen Long	(China) Wang Xin	(South Korea) Jung Jae-sung (South Korea) Lee Yong-dae	(China) Wang Xiaoli (China) Yu Yang	(Denmark) Joachim Fischer Nielsen (Denmark) Christinna Pedersen
France	(Malaysia) Lee Chong Wei	(China) Wang Xin	(South Korea) Jung Jae-sung (South Korea) Lee Yong-dae	(China) Wang Xiaoli (China) Yu Yang	(Denmark) Joachim Fischer Nielsen (Denmark) Christinna Pedersen
Hong Kong	(China) Lin Dan	(China) Wang Xin	(China) Cai Yun (China) Fu Haifeng	(China) Wang Xiaoli (China) Yu Yang	(China) Zhang Nan (China) Zhao Yunlei
China Open	(China) Lin Dan	(China) Wang Yihan	(Denmark) Mathias Boe (Denmark) Carsten Mogensen	(China) Wang Xiaoli (China) Yu Yang	(China) Zhang Nan (China) Zhao Yunlei
(China) Masters Finals	(China) Lin Dan	(China) Wang Yihan	(Denmark) Mathias Boe (Denmark) Carsten Mogensen	(China) Wang Xiaoli (China) Yu Yang	(China) Zhang Nan (China) Zhao Yunlei

Most win: 8 titles

- (China) Wang Xiaoli
- (China) Yu Yang

== 2012 ==
Tour	Men's singles	Women's singles	Men's doubles	Women's doubles	Mixed doubles
Korea	(Malaysia) Lee Chong Wei	(China) Wang Shixian	(China) Cai Yun (China) Fu Haifeng	(China) Tian Qing (China) Zhao Yunlei	(China) Xu Chen (China) Ma Jin
Malaysia	(Malaysia) Lee Chong Wei	(China) Wang Yihan	(Chinese Taipei) Fang Chieh-min (Chinese Taipei) Lee Sheng-mu	(Denmark) Christinna Pedersen (Denmark) Kamilla Rytter Juhl	(China) Zhang Nan (China) Zhao Yunlei
England	(China) Lin Dan	(China) Li Xuerui	(South Korea) Jung Jae-sung (South Korea) Lee Yong-dae	(China) Tian Qing (China) Zhao Yunlei	(Indonesia) Tontowi Ahmad (Indonesia) Liliyana Natsir
India	(South Korea) Son Wan-ho	(China) Li Xuerui	(Thailand) Bodin Isara (Thailand) Maneepong Jongjit	(South Korea) Jung Kyung-eun (South Korea) Kim Ha-na	(Indonesia) Tontowi Ahmad (Indonesia) Liliyana Natsir
Indonesia	(Indonesia) Simon Santoso	(India) Saina Nehwal	(South Korea) Jung Jae-sung (South Korea) Lee Yong-dae	(China) Wang Xiaoli (China) Yu Yang	(Thailand) Sudket Prapakamol (Thailand) Saralee Thungthongkam
Singapore	(Thailand) Boonsak Ponsana	(Germany) Juliane Schenk	(Indonesia) Markis Kido (Indonesia) Hendra Setiawan	(China) Bao Yixin (China) Zhong Qianxin	(Chinese Taipei) Chen Hung-ling (Chinese Taipei) Cheng Wen-hsing
China Masters	(China) Chen Long	(China) Wang Yihan	(China) Zhang Nan (China) Chai Biao	(China) Bao Yixin (China) Zhong Qianxin	(China) Xu Chen (China) Ma Jin
Japan	(Malaysia) Lee Chong Wei	(Chinese Taipei) Tai Tzu-ying	(South Korea) Kim Gi-jung (South Korea) Kim Sa-rang	(Hong Kong) Poon Lok Yan (Hong Kong) Tse Ying Suet	(Malaysia) Chan Peng Soon (Malaysia) Goh Liu Ying
Denmark	(Malaysia) Lee Chong Wei	(India) Saina Nehwal	(South Korea) Shin Baek-cheol (South Korea) Yoo Yeon-seong	(China) Ma Jin (China) Tang Jinhua	(China) Xu Chen (China) Ma Jin
France	(Malaysia) Liew Daren	(Japan) Minatsu Mitani	(South Korea) Lee Yong-dae (South Korea) Ko Sung-hyun	(China) Ma Jin (China) Tang Jinhua	(China) Xu Chen (China) Ma Jin
China Open	(China) Chen Long	(China) Li Xuerui	(Denmark) Mathias Boe (Denmark) Carsten Mogensen	(China) Wang Xiaoli (China) Yu Yang	(China) Xu Chen (China) Ma Jin
Hong Kong	(China) Chen Long	(China) Li Xuerui	(China) Cai Yun (China) Fu Haifeng	(China) Tian Qing (China) Zhao Yunlei	(China) Zhang Nan (China) Zhao Yunlei
Masters Finals	(China) Chen Long	(China) Li Xuerui	(Denmark) Mathias Boe (Denmark) Carsten Mogensen	(China) Wang Xiaoli (China) Yu Yang	(Denmark) Joachim Fischer Nielsen (Denmark) Christinna Pedersen

Most win: 7 titles

- (China) Ma Jin

== 2013 ==
Tour	Men's singles	Women's singles	Men's doubles	Women's doubles	Mixed doubles
(South Korea) Korea	(Malaysia) Lee Chong Wei	(South Korea) Sung Ji-hyun	(South Korea) Ko Sung-hyun (South Korea) Lee Yong-dae	(China) Wang Xiaoli (China) Yu Yang	(China) Zhang Nan (China) Zhao Yunlei
Malaysia	(Malaysia) Lee Chong Wei	(Chinese Taipei) Tai Tzu-ying	(Indonesia) Mohammad Ahsan (Indonesia) Hendra Setiawan	(China) Tian Qing (China) Bao Yixin	(Denmark) Joachim Fischer Nielsen (Denmark) Christinna Pedersen
England	(China) Chen Long	(Denmark) Tine Baun	(China) Liu Xiaolong (China) Qiu Zihan	(China) Wang Xiaoli (China) Yu Yang	(Indonesia) Tontowi Ahmad (Indonesia) Liliyana Natsir
India	(Malaysia) Lee Chong Wei	(Thailand) Ratchanok Intanon	(China) Liu Xiaolong (China) Qiu Zihan	(Japan) Miyuki Maeda (Japan) Satoko Suetsuna	(Indonesia) Tontowi Ahmad (Indonesia) Liliyana Natsir
Indonesia	(Malaysia) Lee Chong Wei	(China) Li Xuerui	(Indonesia) Mohammad Ahsan (Indonesia) Hendra Setiawan	(China) Cheng Shu (China) Bao Yixin	(China) Zhang Nan (China) Zhao Yunlei
Singapore	(Indonesia) Tommy Sugiarto	(China) Wang Yihan	(Indonesia) Mohammad Ahsan (Indonesia) Hendra Setiawan	(China) Tian Qing (China) Zhao Yunlei	(Indonesia) Tontowi Ahmad (Indonesia) Liliyana Natsir
China Masters	(China) Wang Zhengming	(China) Liu Xin	(South Korea) Ko Sung-hyun (South Korea) Lee Yong-dae	(China) Wang Xiaoli (China) Yu Yang	(China) Zhang Nan (China) Zhao Yunlei
Japan	(Malaysia) Lee Chong Wei	(Japan) Akane Yamaguchi	(Indonesia) Mohammad Ahsan (Indonesia) Hendra Setiawan	(China) Ma Jin (China) Tang Jinhua	(China) Zhang Nan (China) Zhao Yunlei
Denmark	(China) Chen Long	(China) Wang Yihan	(South Korea) Lee Yong-dae (South Korea) Yoo Yeon-seong	(China) Bao Yixin (China) Tang Jinhua	(China) Zhang Nan (China) Zhao Yunlei
(France) French	(Denmark) Jan Ø. Jørgensen	(China) Wang Shixian	(Indonesia) Markis Kido (Indonesia) Marcus Fernaldi Gideon	(China) Bao Yixin (China) Tang Jinhua	(China) Zhang Nan (China) Zhao Yunlei
China Open	(China) Chen Long	(China) Li Xuerui	(South Korea) Lee Yong-dae (South Korea) Yoo Yeon-seong	(China) Wang Xiaoli (China) Yu Yang	(Indonesia) Tontowi Ahmad (Indonesia) Liliyana Natsir
Hong Kong	(Malaysia) Lee Chong Wei	(China) Wang Yihan	(South Korea) Lee Yong-dae (South Korea) Yoo Yeon-seong	(China) Bao Yixin (China) Tang Jinhua	(England) Chris Adcock (England) Gabrielle White
(Malaysia) Masters Finals	(Malaysia) Lee Chong Wei	(China) Li Xuerui	(Indonesia) Mohammad Ahsan (Indonesia) Hendra Setiawan	(Denmark) Christinna Pedersen (Denmark) Kamilla Rytter Juhl	(Denmark) Joachim Fischer Nielsen (Denmark) Christinna Pedersen

Most win: 7 titles

- (Malaysia) Lee Chong Wei
- (China) Zhao Yunlei

== 2014 ==
Tour	Men's singles	Women's singles	Men's doubles	Women's doubles	Mixed doubles
(South Korea) Korea	(China) Chen Long	(China) Wang Yihan	(Denmark) Mathias Boe (Denmark) Carsten Mogensen	(China) Bao Yixin (China) Tang Jinhua	(China) Zhang Nan (China) Zhao Yunlei
Malaysia	(Malaysia) Lee Chong Wei	(China) Li Xuerui	(Malaysia) Goh V Shem (Malaysia) Lim Khim Wah	(China) Bao Yixin (China) Tang Jinhua	(China) Xu Chen (China) Ma Jin
England	(Malaysia) Lee Chong Wei	(China) Wang Shixian	(Indonesia) Mohammad Ahsan (Indonesia) Hendra Setiawan	(China) Wang Xiaoli (China) Yu Yang	(Indonesia) Tontowi Ahmad (Indonesia) Liliyana Natsir
India	(Malaysia) Lee Chong Wei	(China) Wang Shixian	(Denmark) Mathias Boe (Denmark) Carsten Mogensen	(China) Tang Yuanting (China) Yu Yang	(Denmark) Joachim Fischer Nielsen (Denmark) Christinna Pedersen
Singapore	(Indonesia) Simon Santoso	(China) Wang Yihan	(China) Cai Yun (China) Lu Kai	(China) Bao Yixin (China) Tang Jinhua	(Indonesia) Tontowi Ahmad (Indonesia) Liliyana Natsir
Japan	(Malaysia) Lee Chong Wei	(China) Li Xuerui	(South Korea) Lee Yong-dae (South Korea) Yoo Yeon-seong	(Japan) Misaki Matsutomo (Japan) Ayaka Takahashi	(China) Zhang Nan (China) Zhao Yunlei
Indonesia	(Denmark) Jan Ø. Jørgensen	(China) Li Xuerui	(South Korea) Lee Yong-dae (South Korea) Yoo Yeon-seong	(China) Tian Qing (China) Zhao Yunlei	(Denmark) Joachim Fischer Nielsen (Denmark) Christinna Pedersen
Australia	(China) Lin Dan	(India) Saina Nehwal	(South Korea) Lee Yong-dae (South Korea) Yoo Yeon-seong	(China) Tian Qing (China) Zhao Yunlei	(South Korea) Ko Sung-hyun (South Korea) Kim Ha-na
Denmark	(China) Chen Long	(China) Li Xuerui	(China) Fu Haifeng (China) Zhang Nan	(China) Wang Xiaoli (China) Yu Yang	(China) Xu Chen (China) Ma Jin
France	(Chinese Taipei) Chou Tien-chen	(China) Wang Shixian	(Denmark) Mathias Boe (Denmark) Carsten Mogensen	(China) Wang Xiaoli (China) Yu Yang	(Indonesia) Tontowi Ahmad (Indonesia) Liliyana Natsir
China	(India) Srikanth Kidambi	(India) Saina Nehwal	(South Korea) Lee Yong-dae (South Korea) Yoo Yeon-seong	(China) Wang Xiaoli (China) Yu Yang	(China) Zhang Nan (China) Zhao Yunlei
Hong Kong	(South Korea) Son Wan-ho	(Chinese Taipei) Tai Tzu-ying	(Indonesia) Mohammad Ahsan (Indonesia) Hendra Setiawan	(China) Tian Qing (China) Zhao Yunlei	(China) Zhang Nan (China) Zhao Yunlei
(United Arab Emirates) Masters Finals	(China) Chen Long	(Chinese Taipei) Tai Tzu-ying	(South Korea) Lee Yong-dae (South Korea) Yoo Yeon-seong	(Japan) Misaki Matsutomo (Japan) Ayaka Takahashi	(China) Zhang Nan (China) Zhao Yunlei

Most win: 7 titles

- (China) Zhao Yunlei

== 2015 ==
Tour	Men's singles	Women's singles	Men's doubles	Women's doubles	Mixed doubles
England	(China) Chen Long	(Spain) Carolina Marín	(Denmark) Mathias Boe (Denmark) Carsten Mogensen	(China) Bao Yixin (China) Tang Yuanting	(China) Zhang Nan (China) Zhao Yunlei
India	(India) Srikanth Kidambi	(India) Saina Nehwal	(China) Chai Biao (China) Hong Wei	(Japan) Misaki Matsutomo (Japan) Ayaka Takahashi	(China) Liu Cheng (China) Bao Yixin
Malaysia	(China) Chen Long	(Spain) Carolina Marín	(Indonesia) Mohammad Ahsan (Indonesia) Hendra Setiawan	(China) Luo Ying (China) Luo Yu	(China) Zhang Nan (China) Zhao Yunlei
Singapore	(Japan) Kento Momota	(China) Sun Yu	(Indonesia) Angga Pratama (Indonesia) Ricky Karanda Suwardi	(China) Ou Dongni (China) Yu Xiaohan	(China) Zhang Nan (China) Zhao Yunlei
Australia	(China) Chen Long	(Spain) Carolina Marín	(South Korea) Lee Yong-dae (South Korea) Yoo Yeon-seong	(China) Ma Jin (China) Tang Yuanting	(Hong Kong) Lee Chun Hei (Hong Kong) Chau Hoi Wah
Indonesia	(Japan) Kento Momota	(Thailand) Ratchanok Intanon	(South Korea) Ko Sung-hyun (South Korea) Shin Baek-cheol	(China) Tang Jinhua (China) Tian Qing	(China) Xu Chen (China) Ma Jin
Japan	(China) Lin Dan	(Japan) Nozomi Okuhara	(South Korea) Lee Yong-dae (South Korea) Yoo Yeon-seong	(China) Zhao Yunlei (China) Zhong Qianxin	(Denmark) Joachim Fischer Nielsen (Denmark) Christinna Pedersen
(South Korea) Korea	(China) Chen Long	(South Korea) Sung Ji-hyun	(South Korea) Lee Yong-dae (South Korea) Yoo Yeon-seong	(Indonesia) Nitya Krishinda Maheswari (Indonesia) Greysia Polii	(China) Zhang Nan (China) Zhao Yunlei
Denmark	(China) Chen Long	(China) Li Xuerui	(South Korea) Lee Yong-dae (South Korea) Yoo Yeon-seong	(South Korea) Jung Kyung-eun (South Korea) Shin Seung-chan	(South Korea) Ko Sung-hyun (South Korea) Kim Ha-na
France	(Malaysia) Lee Chong Wei	(Spain) Carolina Marín	(South Korea) Lee Yong-dae (South Korea) Yoo Yeon-seong	(China) Huang Yaqiong (China) Tang Jinhua	(South Korea) Ko Sung-hyun (South Korea) Kim Ha-na
China	(Malaysia) Lee Chong Wei	(China) Li Xuerui	(South Korea) Kim Gi-jung (South Korea) Kim Sa-rang	(China) Tang Yuanting (China) Yu Yang	(China) Zhang Nan (China) Zhao Yunlei
Hong Kong	(Malaysia) Lee Chong Wei	(Spain) Carolina Marín	(South Korea) Lee Yong-dae (South Korea) Yoo Yeon-seong	(China) Tian Qing (China) Zhao Yunlei	(China) Zhang Nan (China) Zhao Yunlei
(United Arab Emirates) Masters Finals	(Japan) Kento Momota	(Japan) Nozomi Okuhara	(Indonesia) Mohammad Ahsan (Indonesia) Hendra Setiawan	(China) Luo Ying (China) Luo Yu	(England) Chris Adcock (England) Gabby Adcock

Most win: 8 titles

- (China) Zhao Yunlei

== 2016 ==
Tour	Men's singles	Women's singles	Men's doubles	Women's doubles	Mixed doubles
England	(China) Lin Dan	(Japan) Nozomi Okuhara	(Russia) Vladimir Ivanov (Russia) Ivan Sozonov	(Japan) Misaki Matsutomo (Japan) Ayaka Takahashi	(Indonesia) Praveen Jordan (Indonesia) Debby Susanto
India	(Japan) Kento Momota	(Thailand) Ratchanok Intanon	(Indonesia) Marcus Fernaldi Gideon (Indonesia) Kevin Sanjaya Sukamuljo	(Japan) Misaki Matsutomo (Japan) Ayaka Takahashi	(China) Lu Kai (China) Huang Yaqiong
Malaysia	(Malaysia) Lee Chong Wei	(Thailand) Ratchanok Intanon	(South Korea) Kim Gi-jung (South Korea) Kim Sa-rang	(China) Tang Yuanting (China) Yu Yang	(Indonesia) Tontowi Ahmad (Indonesia) Liliyana Natsir
Singapore	(Indonesia) Sony Dwi Kuncoro	(Thailand) Ratchanok Intanon	(China) Fu Haifeng (China) Zhang Nan	(Indonesia) Nitya Krishinda Maheswari (Indonesia) Greysia Polii	(South Korea) Ko Sung-hyun (South Korea) Kim Ha-na
Indonesia	(Malaysia) Lee Chong Wei	(Chinese Taipei) Tai Tzu-ying	(South Korea) Lee Yong-dae (South Korea) Yoo Yeon-seong	(Japan) Misaki Matsutomo (Japan) Ayaka Takahashi	(China) Xu Chen (China) Ma Jin
Australia	(Denmark) H. Vittinghus	(India) Saina Nehwal	(Indonesia) Marcus Fernaldi Gideon (Indonesia) Kevin Sanjaya Sukamuljo	(China) Bao Yixin (China) Chen Qingchen	(China) Lu Kai (China) Huang Yaqiong
Japan	(Malaysia) Lee Chong Wei	(China) He Bingjiao	(China) Li Junhui (China) Liu Yuchen	(Denmark) Christinna Pedersen (Denmark) Kamilla Rytter Juhl	(China) Zheng Siwei (China) Chen Qingchen
(South Korea) Korea	(China) Qiao Bin	(Japan) Akane Yamaguchi	(South Korea) Lee Yong-dae (South Korea) Yoo Yeon-seong	(South Korea) Jung Kyung-eun (South Korea) Shin Seung-chan	(South Korea) Ko Sung-hyun (South Korea) Kim Ha-na
Denmark	(Thailand) T. Saensomboonsuk	(Japan) Akane Yamaguchi	(Malaysia) Goh V Shem (Malaysia) Tan Wee Kiong	(Japan) Misaki Matsutomo (Japan) Ayaka Takahashi	(Denmark) Joachim Fischer Nielsen (Denmark) Christinna Pedersen
France	(China) Shi Yuqi	(China) He Bingjiao	(Denmark) Mathias Boe (Denmark) Carsten Mogensen	(China) Chen Qingchen (China) Jia Yifan	(China) Zheng Siwei (China) Chen Qingchen
China	(Denmark) Jan Ø. Jørgensen	(India) P. V. Sindhu	(Indonesia) Marcus Fernaldi Gideon (Indonesia) Kevin Sanjaya Sukamuljo	(South Korea) Chang Ye-na (South Korea) Lee So-hee	(Indonesia) Tontowi Ahmad (Indonesia) Liliyana Natsir
Hong Kong	(Hong Kong) Ng Ka Long	(Chinese Taipei) Tai Tzu-ying	(Japan) Takeshi Kamura (Japan) Keigo Sonoda	(Denmark) Christinna Pedersen (Denmark) Kamilla Rytter Juhl	(Indonesia) Tontowi Ahmad (Indonesia) Liliyana Natsir
(United Arab Emirates) Masters Finals	(Denmark) Viktor Axelsen	(Chinese Taipei) Tai Tzu-ying	(Malaysia) Goh V Shem (Malaysia) Tan Wee Kiong	(China) Chen Qingchen (China) Jia Yifan	(China) Zheng Siwei (China) Chen Qingchen

Most win: 6 titles

- (China) Chen Qingchen

== 2017 ==
Tour	Men's singles	Women's singles	Men's doubles	Women's doubles	Mixed doubles
England	(Malaysia) Lee Chong Wei	(Chinese Taipei) Tai Tzu-ying	(Indonesia) Marcus Fernaldi Gideon (Indonesia) Kevin Sanjaya Sukamuljo	(South Korea) Chang Ye-na (South Korea) Lee So-hee	(China) Lu Kai (China) Huang Yaqiong
India	(Denmark) Viktor Axelsen	(India) P. V. Sindhu	(Indonesia) Marcus Fernaldi Gideon (Indonesia) Kevin Sanjaya Sukamuljo	(Japan) Shiho Tanaka (Japan) Koharu Yonemoto	(China) Lu Kai (China) Huang Yaqiong
Malaysia	(China) Lin Dan	(Chinese Taipei) Tai Tzu-ying	(Indonesia) Marcus Fernaldi Gideon (Indonesia) Kevin Sanjaya Sukamuljo	(Japan) Yuki Fukushima (Japan) Sayaka Hirota	(China) Zheng Siwei (China) Chen Qingchen
Singapore	(India) B. Sai Praneeth	(Chinese Taipei) Tai Tzu-ying	(Denmark) Mathias Boe (Denmark) Carsten Mogensen	(Denmark) Kamilla Rytter Juhl (Denmark) Christinna Pedersen	(China) Lu Kai (China) Huang Yaqiong
Indonesia	(India) Srikanth Kidambi	(Japan) Sayaka Sato	(China) Li Junhui (China) Liu Yuchen	(China) Chen Qingchen (China) Jia Yifan	(Indonesia) Tontowi Ahmad (Indonesia) Liliyana Natsir
Australia	(India) Srikanth Kidambi	(Japan) Nozomi Okuhara	(Japan) Takeshi Kamura (Japan) Keigo Sonoda	(Japan) Misaki Matsutomo (Japan) Ayaka Takahashi	(China) Zheng Siwei (China) Chen Qingchen
(South Korea) Korea	(Indonesia) Anthony Sinisuka Ginting	(India) P. V. Sindhu	(Denmark) Mathias Boe (Denmark) Carsten Mogensen	(China) Huang Yaqiong (China) Yu Xiaohan	(Indonesia) Praveen Jordan (Indonesia) Debby Susanto
Japan	(Denmark) Viktor Axelsen	(Spain) Carolina Marín	(Indonesia) Marcus Fernaldi Gideon (Indonesia) Kevin Sanjaya Sukamuljo	(Japan) Misaki Matsutomo (Japan) Ayaka Takahashi	(China) Wang Yilyu (China) Huang Dongping
Denmark	(India) Srikanth Kidambi	(Thailand) Ratchanok Intanon	(China) Liu Cheng (China) Zhang Nan	(South Korea) Lee So-hee (South Korea) Shin Seung-chan	(Hong Kong) Tang Chun Man (Hong Kong) Tse Ying Suet
France	(India) Srikanth Kidambi	(Chinese Taipei) Tai Tzu-ying	(Chinese Taipei) Lee Jhe-huei (Chinese Taipei) Lee Yang	(Indonesia) Greysia Polii (Indonesia) Apriyani Rahayu	(Indonesia) Tontowi Ahmad (Indonesia) Liliyana Natsir
China	(China) Chen Long	(Japan) Akane Yamaguchi	(Indonesia) Marcus Fernaldi Gideon (Indonesia) Kevin Sanjaya Sukamuljo	(China) Chen Qingchen (China) Jia Yifan	(China) Zheng Siwei (China) Huang Yaqiong
Hong Kong	(Malaysia) Lee Chong Wei	(Chinese Taipei) Tai Tzu-ying	(Indonesia) Marcus Fernaldi Gideon (Indonesia) Kevin Sanjaya Sukamuljo	(China) Chen Qingchen (China) Jia Yifan	(China) Zheng Siwei (China) Huang Yaqiong
(United Arab Emirates) Masters Finals	(Denmark) Viktor Axelsen	(Japan) Akane Yamaguchi	(Indonesia) Marcus Fernaldi Gideon (Indonesia) Kevin Sanjaya Sukamuljo	(Japan) Shiho Tanaka (Japan) Koharu Yonemoto	(China) Zheng Siwei (China) Chen Qingchen

Most win: 7 titles

- (Indonesia) Marcus Fernaldi Gideon
- (Indonesia) Kevin Sanjaya Sukamuljo

== Winners by country ==
	Team	2007	2008	2009	2010	2011	2012	2013	2014	2015	2016	2017	Total
1	China	38	27	29	30	45	33	31	33	28	17	17	328
2	Indonesia	8	10	5	2	2	4	11	6	4	9	12	73
3	(South Korea) Korea	2	8	8	6	4	7	6	7	12	7	2	69
4	Malaysia	8	8	10	8	5	6	7	5	3	5	2	67
5	Denmark	2	8	7	9	5	4	5	6	2	7	6	61
6	Japan				1	2	1	2	2	6	9	10	33
7	Chinese Taipei			1	2	1	3	1	3		3	6	20
7	India			1	3		2		3	2	2	7	20
9	Thailand	1		1	2	1	3	1		1	4	1	15
10	Hong Kong	1	4	1			1			1	1	1	10
11	Spain									5		1	6
12	England			1				1		1			3
13	Poland			1	1								2
14	Germany						1						1
14	Russia										1		1
14	Singapore				1								1
14	United States	1											1

== List of most successful players ==
Discipline	Player	Title
Men's Singles	(Malaysia) Lee Chong Wei	46
Women's Singles	(China) Wang Yihan	20
Men's Doubles	(South Korea) Lee Yong-dae	37
Women's Doubles	(China) Yu Yang	35
Mixed Doubles	(China) Zhao Yunlei (China) Zhang Nan	27; 27
Singles	(Malaysia) Lee Chong Wei	46
Doubles	(South Korea) Lee Yong-dae	43
